= 1966–67 Cornell Big Red men's ice hockey season =

National champion ECAC Christmas Hockey Tournament, champion Boston Arena Christmas Tournament, co-champion ECAC Tournament, champion NCAA tournament, champion
- Conference: 2nd ECAC Hockey
- Home ice: Lynah Rink

Record
- Overall: 27–1–1
- Conference: 18–1–1
- Home: 9–1
- Road: 9–0
- Neutral: 10–0–1

Coaches and captains
- Head coach: Ned Harkness
- Captain(s): Murray Death; David Ferguson
- Alternate captain: Doug Ferguson

The 1966–67 Cornell Big Red men's ice hockey season was the 51st season of play for the program. The Big Red represented Cornell University in college ice hockey. In its 4th year under head coach Ned Harkness the team compiled a 27–1–1 record and reached the NCAA tournament for the first time in its history. The Big Red defeated Boston University 4–1 in the championship game at the Onondaga County War Memorial in Syracuse, New York. Cornell tied the record, held by several teams, for the fewest losses by an NCAA champion.

== Season ==
=== Early season ===
In the first three seasons under Ned Harkness Cornell had steadily risen in the ECAC, finishing third in the conference and ending the season as the conference runner-up. With the Big Red seemingly just hitting their stride, the team suffered a blow before the season even began with senior netminder David Quarrie going down with an ankle injury. The team turned to sophomore Ken Dryden to hold the fort and hope that they could survive until Quarrie's return. Fortunately they began their season with a relatively easy matchup against McMaster at home and after scoring seven goals in the first period the Big Red skated to a 14–2 win. The game was notable in that the scoring was spread out across all three lines, showing signs that the depth issue that had plagued them the year before may have been addressed.

Cornell opened their ECAC schedule the following game against Rensselaer and while the team as a whole played inconsistently throughout the game, Dryden was particularly notable for how calm and collected he was in goal, holding the Engineers to two goals in Cornell's 7–2 victory. For their third game Cornell took on defending ECAC champion and national runner-up Clarkson. With the Walker Arena filled to capacity Cornell battled the Golden Knights in a very close game that was tied three separate times. Clarkson opened the scoring with a power play marker, putting Cornell down on the scoresheet for the first time all season. The Big Red failed to score on a two-man advantage but continued to put pressure on Clarkson's goal and eventually potted two quick goals in the later half of the first period. Clarkson knotted the score off of a deflection before the frame was over and the two teams went into the first intermission tied at two-all. Cornell's attack kept the puck in Clarkson's end for much of the next two periods but Clarkson's John Miller held the fort and sent the two teams into overtime. While the boisterous crowd continued to root on the Knights it was Cornell's Harry Orr who netted the game-winner at 4:31.

The Big Red returned home for their next two games, first hosting Guelph where sophomore Bob McGuinn scored a hat-trick in the team's 6–1 victory, then welcomed in a good St. Lawrence team only to trounce the Saints 8–0 with Peter Tufford scoring four times while Ken Dryden earned his first varsity shutout. While the win helped propel Cornell to the top of the ECAC the game was marred by penalties and included a stick-swinging incident from the Larrie's Dick Smith who opened a gash in the side of Mike Doran's face that required 14-15 stitches to close. Smith received a 5 minute major penalty for the infraction Doran was able to return later in the game.

Their next game saw Cornell's first Ivy League match of the year at Yale. The Bulldogs' first score was one of the only bad goals Ken Dryden allowed that year and though Cornell tied the game three minutes later, Yale quickly regained the lead. Bobby Ferguson was able to tie the game with a short-handed goal and as the first period was coming to a close Yale took two successive penalties and Dave Ferguson was able to score on both to give Cornell their first lead. The Big Red's defense had fairly poor game and allowed Yale to have many good scoring opportunities but the heroics from Ken Dryden kept the score in Cornell's favor. Bruce Pattison was cut in the third period after being checked into the wire mesh that surrounded the rink rather than plexiglass, leaving the Big Red with just three defenseman for the final 11 minutes but the team was able to rally and skate to a 5–3 win.

=== Holiday tournaments ===
With a perfect 6–0 record Cornell headed to Boston to play in the ECAC Christmas Hockey Tournament. The Big Red opened against Northeastern at the Boston Garden and, despite playing at what amounted to a home game for the Huskies, Cornell trounced their opponents 9–1 with Doug Ferguson's 4 goals leading the way. The next night Cornell took on defending national champion Michigan State for the tournament title and opened the scoring with a Bobby Ferguson goal. The Spartans played the same tough defense that garnered them the 1966 National Title and held Cornell back until late in the second when Dave Ferguson notched a power-play marker. MSU showed their mettle by scoring twice in the third period, first on the power play and then short-handed, to tie the game. Both teams had chances to end the game but Dryden and fellow netminder Gaye Cooley were both stellar and sent the game into overtime. It only took 59 seconds to decide the game when Mike Doran scored on a screened Cooley to win the tournament for Cornell and keep their perfect record.

Just before the winter break Cornell took on Harvard, narrowly escaping with a 4–3 win on the strength of four consecutive goals. Before classes resumed, however, Cornell played in their second holiday championship, this time competing in the Boston Arena Christmas Tournament. Once more they opened against Northeastern and the team appeared to be rusty after their 8-day layoff. The Huskies went ahead twice by one goal before Bobby Ferguson's marker got Cornell their first least with just under nine minutes to play. Tufford got an empty-net goal to close out the game but the injury bug bit the Big Red again when Brian Cornell tore ligaments in his right knee and missed the rest of the season. After their lack-luster performance, Harkness shuffled his lines before the game against Harvard and got an immediate return when Doug Ferguson scored 28 seconds into the game. Cornell scored twice more before the period was out and with Dryden making 33 saves in the game The Big Red won 4–1 and set up a showdown against Boston University.

In 'The Game' Cornell and BU entered the contest with a combined 22–1 record with both vying for the top spot in the ECAC. Cornell opened the scoring with Harry Orr's goal on a two-man advantage early in the first but were answered by two BU power play goals before the period was over. Bobby Ferguson tied the game early in the second and was followed a minute later by Skip Stanowski to give the lead back to Cornell. The Big Red were unable to score another goal for the remainder of the game despite the pressure they put on BU's Wayne Ryan. Still holding the narrow lead late in the third, while on the power play Stanowski was beat out to a loose puck by Darrell Abbott who proceeded to flip the puck over Dryden's shoulder and tie the game. With the game heading into overtime, neither team showed the stamina required to prevail after their third game in as many days. After the first 10-minute period ended both coaches agreed to play one more extra frame but the additional time proved nothing and the two teams agreed to end with a tie. Fittingly Dryden shared the tournament MVP award with his counterpart Wayne Ryan while Doug Ferguson, Stanowski and Orr were named to the All-Tournament team along with their netminder.

=== New Year ===
With BU and Cornell now tied atop the ECAC standing with no more games between the two neither could afford to slip much if they wanted to win the ECAC championship. The Big Red headed home for their next game against Yale and welcomed back David Quarrie in net for his first game since being injured. Though his ankle had not been badly hurt it was the otherworldly play of Dryden that kept Quarrie out of the net. In Quarrie's return to action he didn't play poorly but he wasn't able to overcome his team's defensive lapses, bad penalties and inability to score when they had their opportunities. Even worse was a second period goal that was waved off by the referee that could have given Cornell the game. It was, however, two power play goals by Yale in the third period put the Bulldogs ahead but with less than five minutes remaining Sophomore Ted Coviello tied the game at 3–3. Despite outshooting Yale 112 to 49 in the contest Cornell was unable to earn a fourth goal and it was Yale's Jack Morrison who scored the game winner at 6:09 of extra time.

Because BU had won their contest against Clarkson, Cornell was now in second-place in the ECAC and would have to hope that BU would slip up. In any event Dryden returned to the net for the next game and the Big Red punished Colgate on the road, winning 8–0 while Ken Dryden earned his second shutout with only light duty. At the same time the NCAA held a vote that ended the Ivy League's petition to eliminate the 1.6 rule from the athletic participation bylaws. The rule had been put into place the year before and stipulated that the all students must maintain a 1.6 grade point average on a 4.0 scale (equivalent to a D+ average) to be eligible for an athletic scholarship. The Ivy League fought the ruling on the grounds that its member schools did not give out scholarships solely for athletic ability and that the rule violated institutional autonomy. The Ivies received support from the greater ECAC as well as the Southwest and ACC conferences but the proposal was defeated 153 to 113. While the ruling went against their interests, the decision made it so that Cornell would be eligible for the 1967 tournament after having to decline the invitation to the previous year's championship.

Cornell regained their lead in the Ivy League race by defeating Brown 6–1 in a fast-paced game that saw very few shots on net despite the action. Though he was hardly fatigued from making 13 saves, Dryden was replaced in goal for the next game against Colgate by Quarrie. The visiting Red Raiders were mercilessly vanquished by the Big Red who scored the first nine goals of the game before surrendering two fairly meaningless markers in the third. The win was Quarrie's first of the season and it would also end up being the final minutes he would play in a Cornell uniform.

=== Down the stretch ===
After taking the rest of January off, the team returned to the ice at Boston College on the first of February and fought to a close 3–2 road victory. The Big Red offence remained muted over the next to games against Western Ontario and Princeton, scoring only three times in each contest but Ken Dryden continued to show that he was the best goaltender in the college ranks by surrendering a single score in each game. When Cornell's offensive firepower returned against Dartmouth Dryden upped his game again by recording his third shutout of the season. In the final four games of their schedule Cornell dominated their Ivy League competition, outscoring their opponents by a combined score of 19–5 and finishing the season 18–1–1 in conference play. Unfortunately, Boston University had not lost a single conference game and finished just ahead of the Big Red, denying Cornell a conference championship despite a .925 winning percentage.

=== ECAC Tournament ===
The Big Red opened the conference tournament at the Boston Garden as the #2 seed against Brown and took their frustrations out on the Bears. Cornell dispatched their fellow Ivy-Leaguers 11–2 and advanced to the second round where they met BC. While their earlier meeting had been a close affair the Big Red made no mistake in the rematch and posted 12 goals to silence a hostile crowd and send the Eagles packing, as they had done the year before. The championship game brought the meeting that everyone had been waiting for, a rematch between the two best teams in the nation when Cornell and BU faced off for the ECAC championship. The Terriers' defense was a far better match against Cornell's big guns than the previous two opponents and Cornell was limited to a single goal in the first two periods. The skating ability of the Big Red forwards wore down BU in the third, however, and Cornell was able to score three times in the final frame, the last coming from the stick of Mike Doran with under nine minutes to play that proved to be the game-winner and earned Cornell its first conference championship.

=== NCAA tournament ===
Cornell was given the automatic berth into the NCAA tournament as the ECAC tournament champion, the first appearance in the history of the program, but despite this, as well as possessing the best record in the nation (25–1–1) Cornell was pitted against the better of the two WCHA teams in the semifinal, North Dakota. This likely happened as a result of Cornell having already played Michigan State earlier in the year but regardless Cornell opened against a strong WCHA champion loaded with players already experienced with the NCAA tournament. Cornell didn't seem to take note at the start, however, and out dueled North Dakota 12 shots to 8. UND netminder Mike Curran fought off the Cornell attack for most of the first frame but a shot from Skip Stanowski finally found its way into the net at the end of the period. North Dakota picked up the pace in the second, equaling Cornell's thirteen shots but neither netminder gave an inch and the game remained in Cornell's favor by the slimmest of margins. After their attack came to naught, North Dakota flagged in the final period and though Curran would continue to hold the fort the Sioux attack could not solve Dryden and Cornell skated to victory. Dryden's fourth shoutout of the season was only the second shutout in any NCAA tournament and by far the lowest-scoring game in history. No game would have fewer goals in regulation until 2004 when a Regional semifinal went into overtime tied 0–0.

The championship game saw a third meeting between Cornell and BU, all of which coming in de facto tournament finals. The Terriers were looking for revenge after suffering a loss in the ECAC championship but, perhaps more importantly, this was the first time since 1949 that both finalists came from the eastern region which guaranteed that the east would have a national champion for the first time since 1954. Despite the game being played in Syracuse the crowd was decidedly in favor of BU and the team seemed to feed off of the energy early with an attack on the Cornell net in the first minute. Dryden held the Terriers back and allowed Bob Kinasewich to open the scoring before two minutes had elapsed. Boston University pulled back after the quick change of fortune and Cornell took advantage with their own offensive salvo. As the shots piled up for Cornell, however, Wayne Ryan was up to the task and held Cornell back until late in the first when the Big Red doubled their lead with a power play goal from the combined efforts of the Ferguson twins. Mid-way through the second Cornell connected on another power play to push their lead to three but just 12 seconds later BU finally was able to get a puck past Dryden to cut the lead back to 2. The goal reignited BU's offense and the Terriers began peppering the cage with shots but the nation's top goaltender turned everything back and as the seconds ticked past the chance for the Terriers became more and more remote. When Robert McGuinn scored halfway through the third it was the final nail in BU's coffin and Cornell won their first national championship 4–1.

=== Awards and records ===
Ken Dryden set an all-time record by allowing just one goal in two games for a goals against average of 0.50 to go along with his .986 save percentage, a record for both the Frozen Four and overall tournament (as of 2018). Despite his historical numbers Dryden was not named as Tournament Most Outstanding Player, that honor instead went to Skip Stanowski, the standout defenseman who finished the tournament with two goals and two assists (contributing on 80% of Cornell's offense) and scored both game-winning goals. Dryden would have to settle for being named to the All-Tournament first team along with Stanowski, Harry Orr and Mike Doran. Dave and Doug Ferguson were also named to the Second Team.

Dryden, Orr and Doug Ferguson were named to both the AHCA All-American East Team as well as the All-ECAC Hockey First Team while Doran made the ECAC Second Team. Doug Ferguson was also named as the ECAC Hockey Player of the Year while Harry Orr received the Outstanding Defenseman Award (The last player in history to win the award). Again, despite his setting new NCAA records with a 1.46 GAA and a .945 save percentage, Dryden did not receive the ECAC Rookie of the Year which instead went to BU's Herb Wakabayashi who finished second in scoring in the nation. Part of the trouble in earning recognition for his efforts was the performance of Quarrie and Errol McKibbon the previous year; both played at least ten games for the Big Red and each goaltender had surrendered less than two goals per game. While the voters for these awards may have believed that Cornell had insulated the sophomore, time would show the wiser.

Cornell's loss to Yale in January was the last home loss Cornell would suffer for over five years. The winning streak ended at 63 games, by far the longest such stretch in NCAA history.

== Standings ==
1966–67 ECAC Hockey standings
	Conference							Overall					
	GP	W	L	T	Pct.	GF	GA	GP	W	L	T	GF	GA
Boston University†	20	19	0	1	.975	147	48	31	25	5	1	176	66
Cornell*	20	18	1	1	.925	106	32	29	27	1	1	132	46
Boston College	20	14	6	0	.700	121	60	28	20	8	0	171	91
St. Lawrence	15	9	5	1	.633	66	64	26	17	8	1	122	84
Yale	22	13	9	0	.591	117	112	24	13	11	0	119	112
Clarkson	15	8	6	1	.567	78	65	23	14	8	1	127	84
New Hampshire^	9	5	4	0	.556	32	34	25	18	7	0	115	71
Brown	16	8	8	0	.500	88	64	24	13	11	0	135	98
Harvard	21	10	11	0	.476	97	86	23	11	12	0	106	88
Army	11	5	6	0	.455	41	47	27	15	12	0	151	104
Northeastern	20	9	11	0	.450	62	79	26	12	14	0	86	95
Colgate	16	5	11	0	.313	41	87	26	11	15	0	88	130
Princeton	20	6	14	0	.300	85	106	22	7	15	0	92	106
Providence	15	2	13	0	.133	37	111	20	3	17	0	46	136
Dartmouth	15	1	14	0	.067	37	115	20	4	16	0	56	130
Rensselaer	15	1	14	0	.067	58	118	24	8	15	1	106	158
Championship: Cornell † indicates conference regular season champion * indicates conference tournament champion^ New Hampshire had been readmitted to the ECAC but played only a partial schedule and still qualified for the ECAC II playoffs

== Schedule ==
The team's schedule was as follows:

Date	Opponent^{#}	Rank^{#}	Site	Decision	Result	Record
Regular season
November 24	vs. McMaster*		Lynah Rink • Ithaca, New York	Dryden	W 14–2	1–0
November 26	at Rensselaer		Houston Field House • Troy, New York	Dryden	W 7–2	2–0 (1–0)
November 29	at Clarkson		Clarkson Arena • Potsdam, New York	Dryden	W 3–2 ^{OT}	3–0 (2–0)
December 2	vs. Guelph*		Lynah Rink • Ithaca, New York	Dryden	W 6–1	4–0 (2–0)
December 6	vs. St. Lawrence		Lynah Rink • Ithaca, New York	Dryden	W 8–0	5–0 (3–0)
December 10	at Yale		Ingalls Rink • New Haven, Connecticut	Dryden	W 5–3	6–0 (4–0)
ECAC Christmas Hockey Tournament
December 16	vs. Northeastern		Boston Garden • Boston, Massachusetts (ECAC Christmas Hockey Tournament)	Dryden	W 9–1	7–0 (5–0)
December 17	vs. Michigan State*		Boston Garden • Boston, Massachusetts (ECAC Christmas Hockey Tournament)	Dryden	W 3–2	8–0 (5–0)
December 20	vs. Harvard		Lynah Rink • Ithaca, New York	Dryden	W 4–3	9–0 (6–0)
Boston Arena Christmas Tournament
December 28	vs. Northeastern		Boston Arena • Boston, Massachusetts (Boston Arena Christmas Tournament)	Dryden	W 4–2	10–0 (7–0)
December 29	vs. Harvard		Boston Arena • Boston, Massachusetts (Boston Arena Christmas Tournament)	Dryden	W 4–1	11–0 (8–0)
December 30	vs. Boston University		Boston Arena • Boston, Massachusetts (Boston Arena Christmas Tournament)	Dryden	T 3–3 ^{2OT}	11–0–1 (8–0–1)
January 7	vs. Yale		Lynah Rink • Ithaca, New York	Quarrie	L 3–4 ^{OT}	11–1–1 (8–1–1)
January 11	at Colgate		Starr Arena • Hamilton, New York	Dryden	W 8–0	12–1–1 (9–1–1)
January 14	vs. Brown		Lynah Rink • Ithaca, New York	Dryden	W 6–1	13–1–1 (10–1–1)
January 19	vs. Colgate		Lynah Rink • Ithaca, New York	Quarrie	W 10–2	14–1–1 (11–1–1)
February 1	at Boston College		McHugh Forum • Chestnut Hill, Massachusetts	Dryden	W 3–2	15–1–1 (12–1–1)
February 4	vs. Western Ontario*		Lynah Rink • Ithaca, New York	Dryden	W 3–1	16–1–1 (12–1–1)
February 9	at Princeton		Hobey Baker Memorial Rink • Princeton, New Jersey	Dryden	W 3–1	17–1–1 (13–1–1)
February 11	at Dartmouth		Davis Rink • Hanover, New Hampshire	Dryden	W 7–0	18–1–1 (14–1–1)
February 18	at Brown		Meehan Auditorium • Providence, Rhode Island	Dryden	W 4–2	19–1–1 (15–1–1)
February 22	at Harvard		Donald C. Watson Rink • Boston, Massachusetts	Dryden	W 4–1	20–1–1 (16–1–1)
February 25	vs. Dartmouth		Lynah Rink • Ithaca, New York	Dryden	W 6–1	21–1–1 (17–1–1)
March 4	at Princeton		Lynah Rink • Ithaca, New York	Dryden	W 5–1	22–1–1 (18–1–1)
ECAC Hockey Tournament
March 7	vs. Brown*		Boston Garden • Boston, Massachusetts (ECAC Quarterfinal)	Dryden	W 11–2	23–1–1 (18–1–1)
March 9	vs. Boston College*		Boston Garden • Boston, Massachusetts (ECAC Semifinal)	Dryden	W 12–2	24–1–1 (18–1–1)
March 11	vs. Boston University*		Boston Garden • Boston, Massachusetts (ECAC championship)	Dryden	W 4–3	25–1–1 (18–1–1)
NCAA tournament
March 18	vs. North Dakota*		Onondaga County War Memorial • Syracuse, New York (National Semifinal)	Dryden	W 1–0	26–1–1 (18–1–1)
March 18	vs. Boston University*		Onondaga County War Memorial • Syracuse, New York (National championship)	Dryden	W 4–1	27–1–1 (18–1–1)
*Non-conference game. ^{#}Rankings from USCHO.com Poll. Source:

== Roster and scoring statistics ==
The team roster and scoring statistics were as follows:

No.	Name	Year	Position	Hometown	S/P/C	Games	Goals	Assists	Pts	PIM
7	Doug Ferguson	Senior	C	Birsay, SK	(Saskatchewan)	29	27	34	61	103
9	Peter Tufford	Sophomore	C	St. Catharines, ON	(Ontario)	29	28	19	47	8
8	Mike Doran	Senior	W	Toronto, ON	(Ontario)	29	15	29	44	57
12	Dave Ferguson	Senior	W	Birsay, SK	(Saskatchewan)	28	17	17	34	77
15	Robert McGuinn	Sophomore	W	Toronto, ON	(Ontario)	29	17	16	33	14
3	Skip Stanowski	Junior	D	Winnipeg, MB	(Manitoba)	29	11	17	28	24
18	Murray Death	Senior	F	Weston, ON	(Ontario)	29	8	19	27	28
19	Harry Orr	Senior	D	Port Credit, ON	(Ontario)	28	5	21	26	81
5	Bobby Ferguson	Senior	W	Birsay, SK	(Saskatchewan)	29	17	8	25	6
14	Bob Kinasewich	Senior	W/D	Edmonton, AB	(Alberta)	29	6	15	21	26
17	Ted Coviello	Sophomore	D	Saskatoon, SK	(Saskatchewan)	25	4	17	21	6
21	Bruce Pattison	Sophomore	D	Aurora, ON	(Ontario)	29	5	11	16	16
16	Brian Cornell	Sophomore	W	Niagara Falls, ON	(Ontario)	10	2	11	13	0
10	Paul Althouse	Senior	D	Kentville, NS	(Nova Scotia)	28	2	11	13	42
11	Andrew Crowley	Junior	W	Framingham, MA	(Massachusetts)	14	0	3	3	4
	Kennedy Smith	Sophomore	W	Agincourt, ON	(Ontario)	3	0	1	1	0
4	Murray Watkinson	Sophomore	D	St. Mary's, ON	(Ontario)	9	0	1	1	4
1	David Quarrie	Senior	G	Galt, ON	(Ontario)	2	0	0	0	0
1	Ken Dryden	Sophomore	G	Hamilton, ON	(Ontario)	27	0	0	0	0
	Terrence McGlashan	Senior	D	Toronto, ON	(Ontario)	0	-	-	-	-
	James Gately	Junior	D	Maynard, MA	(Massachusetts)	0	-	-	-	-
6	Wayne Currie	Senior	W	Toronto, ON	(Ontario)	0	-	-	-	-
2	James Taverner	Sophomore	D	St. Catharines, ON	(Ontario)	0	-	-	-	-
1	George Swan	Sophomore	G	Barrie, ON	(Ontario)	0	-	-	-	-
Total							164	250	414	496

* These statistics are inaccurate. The sum total of 164 goals is 32 more than Cornell scored for the season.

== Goaltending statistics ==
No.	Name	Games	Minutes	Wins	Losses	Ties	Goals against	Saves	Shut outs	SV %	GAA
1	Ken Dryden	27	1646	26	0	1	40	689	4	.945	1.46
1	David Quarrie	2	126	1	1	0	6	33	0	.846	2.86
Total		29	1772	27	1	1	46	722	4	.940	1.56

== 1967 championship game ==
=== (E1) Boston University vs. (E2) Cornell ===
March 18	Boston University	1 – 4	Cornell	Onondaga County War Memorial

Scoring summary
Period	Team	Goal	Assist(s)	Time	Score
1st	COR	Bob Kinasewich	Death and Stanowski	1:26	1–0 COR
1st	COR	Skip Stanowski - GW PP	Da. Ferguson and Orr	18:55	2–0 COR
2nd	COR	Doug Ferguson - PP	Da. Ferguson	32:41	3–0 COR
2nd	BU	Mike Sobeski	Quinn and Bassi	32:53	3–1 COR
3rd	COR	Robert McGuinn	Coviello and Stanowski	50:12	4–1 COR
Penalty summary
Period	Team	Player	Penalty	Time	PIM
1st	COR	Ted Coviello	Tripping	1:52	2:00
1st	COR	Bruce Pattison	Hooking	11:08	2:00
1st	BU	Jack Parker	Hooking	17:40	2:00
2nd	COR	Bob Kinasewich	Leaving feet to play puck	22:01	2:00
2nd	COR	Harry Orr	Tripping	23:38	2:00
2nd	BU	Mike Sobeski	Interference	26:50	2:00
2nd	BU	John Cooke	Charging	32:12	2:00
2nd	COR	Paul Althouse	Hooking	34:37	2:00
2nd	COR	Mike Doran	Cross–Checking	35:29	2:00
2nd	BU	Fred Bassi	Tripping	37:32	2:00
3rd	COR	Harry Orr	Spearing	43:09	2:00
3rd	BU	Fred Bassi	Cross–Checking	48:10	2:00
3rd	COR	Harry Orr	Interference	55:27	2:00
3rd	COR	Dave Ferguson	High–Sticking	57:02	2:00
3rd	COR	Dave Ferguson	Fighting (disqualified)	57:02	5:00
3rd	BU	Bill Riley	High–Sticking	57:02	2:00
3rd	BU	Jack Parker	Roughing	57:02	2:00

Shots by period
Team	1	2	3	T
Cornell	14	16	6	36
Boston University	9	16	18	42

Goaltenders
Team	Name	Saves	Goals against	Time on ice
COR	Ken Dryden	41	1	60:00
BU	Wayne Ryan	32	4	60:00
