= Boston University–Cornell men's ice hockey rivalry =

Sports rivalry in men's ice hockey

- Boston University Terriers Cornell Big Red
- Sport: Ice hockey
- First meeting: January 10, 1925; Boston University 7–2
- Latest meeting: November 29, 2025; Boston University 2–1
- Next meeting: December 4, 2026

Statistics
- Total meetings: 54
- All-time series: Cornell, 27–24–3
- Largest victory: Cornell, 8–1 (March 11, 1966)
- Longest win streak: Boston University: 6 (January 23, 1974 – January 4, 1978); Cornell: 9 (March 11, 1967 – January 23, 1971)
- Longest unbeaten streak: Cornell: 11 (March 11, 1966 – January 23, 1971)
- Current win streak: Boston University: 2 (March 29, 2025 – present)
- Current unbeaten streak: Boston University: 2–0–0 (March 29, 2025 – present)

Locations of Cornell and Boston University

The Boston University–Cornell men's ice hockey rivalry is an ice hockey sports rivalry between the programs at Boston University and Cornell University.

Due to playing in separate conferences, the two teams no longer play an annual series, however, they have continued the rivalry by meeting at Madison Square Garden every other year around Thanksgiving.

== History ==
Cornell is one of the few teams to hold a winning record against Boston University in ice hockey. Of those teams, no squad had faced the Terriers more than the Big Red.

=== Early years ===
Cornell played its first ice hockey games as far back as the late-19th century. Boston University was a relative newcomer, playing its first match during the final year of World War I. Despite being two of the oldest programs in the country, they only met twice until the mid-1960s. This happened due to several factors, with the main being that Cornell only played a few games each year until building the Lynah Rink in 1957. However, even after becoming conference rivals when ECAC Hockey was formed in 1961, the two squads never got around to scheduling one another until 1968.

=== Championship eras ===
During the 1966–67 season, the two sides met in the Boston Arena Christmas Tournament championship. At the time, the two were ranked as the top two clubs in the nation with only a single loss between them. They batted to an even 3–3 draw after two overtimes and, though they could have continued the match, both coaches agreed to call the game a draw. They later met in the ECAC Hockey tournament final, still ranked No. 1 and No. 2. This time, Cornell was able to come out on top with 4–3 victory. Just one week later, they had their third meeting of the season in the NCAA tournament finale. This was the first time in almost 20 years that two eastern teams met in the championship game and Cornell was able to ride an outstanding performance from Ken Dryden to the program first national championship. Cornell would dominate the meeting for the next several years as they remained one of the best programs in college hockey.

By 1971, however, the Terriers were able to reverse the trend and defeated Cornell in the league's third place game to earn an improbable bid to the NCAA tournament, eventually capturing their first championship in 1971. The next year, the two met again in the NCAA tournament championship. BU was able to get even thanks to a shutout from Tim Regan for their second consecutive title. The 1970s proved to be much more favorable for the Terriers as they won every meeting over an almost 4-year span but, just as they had at the beginning of the decade, Cornell was able to catch up by the end of the 1970s and put another 6-game winning streak together.

=== Separate conferences ===
In 1984 ECAC Hockey was split with Cornell remaining in the original league while BU became a founding member of Hockey East. The two played sparingly over the next two decades, however, in 2007 they decided to renew their rivalry. Beginning in November of that year, they initiated a biannual meeting that would take place at Madison Square Garden and named the series "Red Hot Hockey", referencing the main colors of the two universities (scarlet and carnelian).

Aside from the Red Hot Hockey series, the two sides have also met three times in the NCAA tournament since 2018 with Boston University winning all three meetings by two goals or less.

== Game results ==
Full game results for the rivalry, with rankings beginning in the 1998–99 season.

Boston University victories	Cornell victories	Tie games

No.	Date	Location	Winning team		Losing team		Notes
1	January 10, 1925	Beebe Lake; Ithaca, NY	Boston University	7	Cornell	2	
2	January 23, 1926	Beebe Lake; Ithaca, NY	Boston University	1	Cornell	0	
3	March 11, 1966	Boston Arena; Boston, MA	Cornell	8	Boston University	1	ECAC Tournament Semifinal
4	December 30, 1966	Boston Arena; Boston, MA	Tie	3	Tie	3	(2OT); Boston Arena Christmas Tournament Championship
5	March 11, 1967	Boston Garden; Boston, MA	Cornell	4	Boston University	3	ECAC Tournament Championship
6	March 18, 1967	Onondaga County War Memorial; Syracuse, NY	Cornell	4	Boston University	1	NCAA Tournament Championship
7	January 23, 1968	Boston Arena; Boston, MA	Cornell	3	Boston University	2	
8	March 8, 1968	Boston Garden; Boston, MA	Cornell	7	Boston University	2	ECAC Tournament Semifinal
9	February 18, 1969	Lynah Rink; Ithaca, NY	Cornell	2	Boston University	1	
10	March 7, 1969	Boston Garden; Boston, MA	Cornell	3	Boston University	2	(OT); ECAC Tournament Semifinal
11	December 9, 1969	Boston Arena; Boston, MA	Cornell	5	Boston University	3	
12	January 2, 1970	Onondaga County War Memorial; Syracuse, NY	Cornell	4	Boston University	1	Syracuse Invitational Semifinal
13	January 23, 1971	Lynah Rink; Ithaca, NY	Cornell	5	Boston University	1	
14	March 13, 1971	Boston Garden; Boston, MA	Boston University	6	Cornell	5	ECAC Tournament Third-Place Game
15	December 30, 1971	Onondaga County War Memorial; Syracuse, NY	Cornell	3	Boston University	2	Syracuse Invitational Championship
16	March 1, 1972	Walter Brown Arena; Boston, MA	Cornell	3	Boston University	2	
17	March 11, 1972	Boston Garden; Boston, MA	Boston University	4	Cornell	1	ECAC Tournament Championship
18	March 18, 1972	Boston Garden; Boston, MA	Boston University	4	Cornell	0	NCAA Tournament Championship
19	December 13, 1972	Lynah Rink; Ithaca, NY	Cornell	9	Boston University	0	Game score: BU 9 – CU 0; Cornell awarded win by forfeit
20	January 23, 1974	Walter Brown Arena; Boston, MA	Boston University	7	Cornell	2	
21	March 8, 1974	Boston Garden; Boston, MA	Boston University	7	Cornell	3	ECAC Tournament Semifinal
22	February 26, 1975	Lynah Rink; Ithaca, NY	Boston University	6	Cornell	4	
23	March 2, 1976	Walter Brown Arena; Boston, MA	Boston University	9	Cornell	4	
24	January 8, 1977	Lynah Rink; Ithaca, NY	Boston University	7	Cornell	6	(OT)
25	January 4, 1978	Walter Brown Arena; Boston, MA	Boston University	6	Cornell	5	
26	January 6, 1979	Lynah Rink; Ithaca, NY	Cornell	5	Boston University	1	
27	March 10, 1979	Boston Garden; Boston, MA	Cornell	7	Boston University	4	ECAC Tournament Third-Place Game
28	March 8, 1980	Walter Brown Arena; Boston, MA	Cornell	6	Boston University	5	(OT)
29	December 6, 1980	Lynah Rink; Ithaca, NY	Cornell	6	Boston University	2	
30	December 5, 1981	Walter Brown Arena; Boston, MA	Cornell	7	Boston University	2	
31	December 4, 1982	Lynah Rink; Ithaca, NY	Cornell	5	Boston University	3	
32	December 3, 1983	Walter Brown Arena; Boston, MA	Boston University	4	Cornell	2	
33	December 10, 1988	Boston Garden; Boston, MA	Cornell	8	Boston University	2	
34	December 29, 1988	Onondaga County War Memorial; Syracuse, NY	Boston University	4	Cornell	2	Syracuse Invitational Third Place Game
35	November 23, 1993	Lynah Rink; Ithaca, NY	Boston University	4	Cornell	3	
36	November 21, 1995	Walter Brown Arena; Boston, MA	Boston University	7	Cornell	1	
37	November 24, 2001	Walter Brown Arena; Boston, MA	No. 5 Boston University	5	No. 11 Cornell	3	
38	November 25, 2001	Walter Brown Arena; Boston, MA	No. 11 Cornell	4	No. 5 Boston University	2	
39	November 30, 2002	Lynah Rink; Ithaca, NY	No. 7 Cornell	4	No. 12 Boston University	1	
40	December 1, 2002	Lynah Rink; Ithaca, NY	No. 7 Cornell	5	No. 12 Boston University	1	
41	November 24, 2007	Madison Square Garden; Manhattan, NY	Boston University	6	Cornell	3	Red Hot Hockey
42	November 28, 2009	Madison Square Garden; Manhattan, NY	Tie	3	Tie	3	(OT); Red Hot Hockey; No. 8 CU vs. Unranked BU
43	November 26, 2011	Madison Square Garden; Manhattan, NY	No. 15 Boston University	2	No. 17 Cornell	1	(OT); Red Hot Hockey
44	November 30, 2013	Madison Square Garden; Manhattan, NY	Boston University	3	No. 14 Cornell	2	Red Hot Hockey
45	November 28, 2015	Madison Square Garden; Manhattan, NY	Tie	3	Tie	3	(OT); Red Hot Hockey; No. 11 BU vs. No. 16 CU
46	November 25, 2017	Madison Square Garden; Manhattan, NY	No. 7 Cornell	4	No. 19т Boston University	3	(OT); Red Hot Hockey
47	March 24, 2018	DCU Center; Worcester, MA	No. 13 Boston University	3	No. 4 Cornell	1	NCAA Tournament Regional Semifinal
48	November 30, 2019	Madison Square Garden; Manhattan, NY	No. 2 Cornell	2	Boston University	0	Red Hot Hockey
49	November 27, 2021	Madison Square Garden; Manhattan, NY	No. 10 Cornell	6	Boston University	4	Red Hot Hockey
50	January 14, 2023	Agganis Arena; Boston, MA	No. 7 Boston University	4	No. 15 Cornell	3	
51	March 25, 2023	SNHU Arena; Manchester, NH	No. 5 Boston University	2	No. 12 Cornell	1	NCAA Tournament Regional Final
52	November 25, 2023	Madison Square Garden; Manhattan, NY	No. 16 Cornell	2	No. 5 Boston University	1	Red Hot Hockey
53	March 29, 2025	Huntington Center; Toledo, OH	No. 8 Boston University	3	No. 16 Cornell	2	(OT); NCAA Tournament Regional Final
54	November 29, 2025	Madison Square Garden; Manhattan, NY	No. 19 Boston University	2	No. 17 Cornell	1	Red Hot Hockey
Series: Cornell leads 27–24–3

== Series facts ==
Statistic	Boston University	Cornell
Games played	54	
Wins	24	27
Home wins	7	8
Road wins	5	6
Neutral site wins	12	13
Goals scored	183	188
Most goals scored in a game by one team	9 (1972, 1976)	8 (1966, 1988)
Most goals in a game by both teams	13 (1976 – Boston University 9, Cornell 4; and 1977 – Boston University 7, Cornell 6)	
Fewest goals in a game by both teams	1 (1926)	
Fewest goals scored in a game by one team in a win	1 (1926)	2 (1969, 2019, 2023)
Most goals scored in a game by one team in a loss	9 (1972)	6 (1977)
Largest margin of victory	6 (1995)	7 (1966)
Longest winning streak	6 (1974 – 1978)	9 (1967 – 1971)
Longest unbeaten streak	6 (1974 – 1978)	11 (1966 – 1971)
