= 2022–23 Cornell Big Red men's ice hockey season =

Collegiate ice hockey season

NCAA Tournament, Regional Final
- Conference: 3rd ECAC Hockey
- Home ice: Lynah Rink

Rankings
- USCHO: #9
- USA Today: #9

Record
- Overall: 21–11–2
- Conference: 13–4–1
- Home: 12–3–1
- Road: 7–6–1
- Neutral: 2–2–0

Coaches and captains
- Head coach: Mike Schafer
- Assistant coaches: Ben Syer; Sean Flanagan; Mitch Stephens
- Captain(s): Sam Malinski; Travis Mitchell
- Alternate captain(s): Max Andreyev; Matt Stienburg

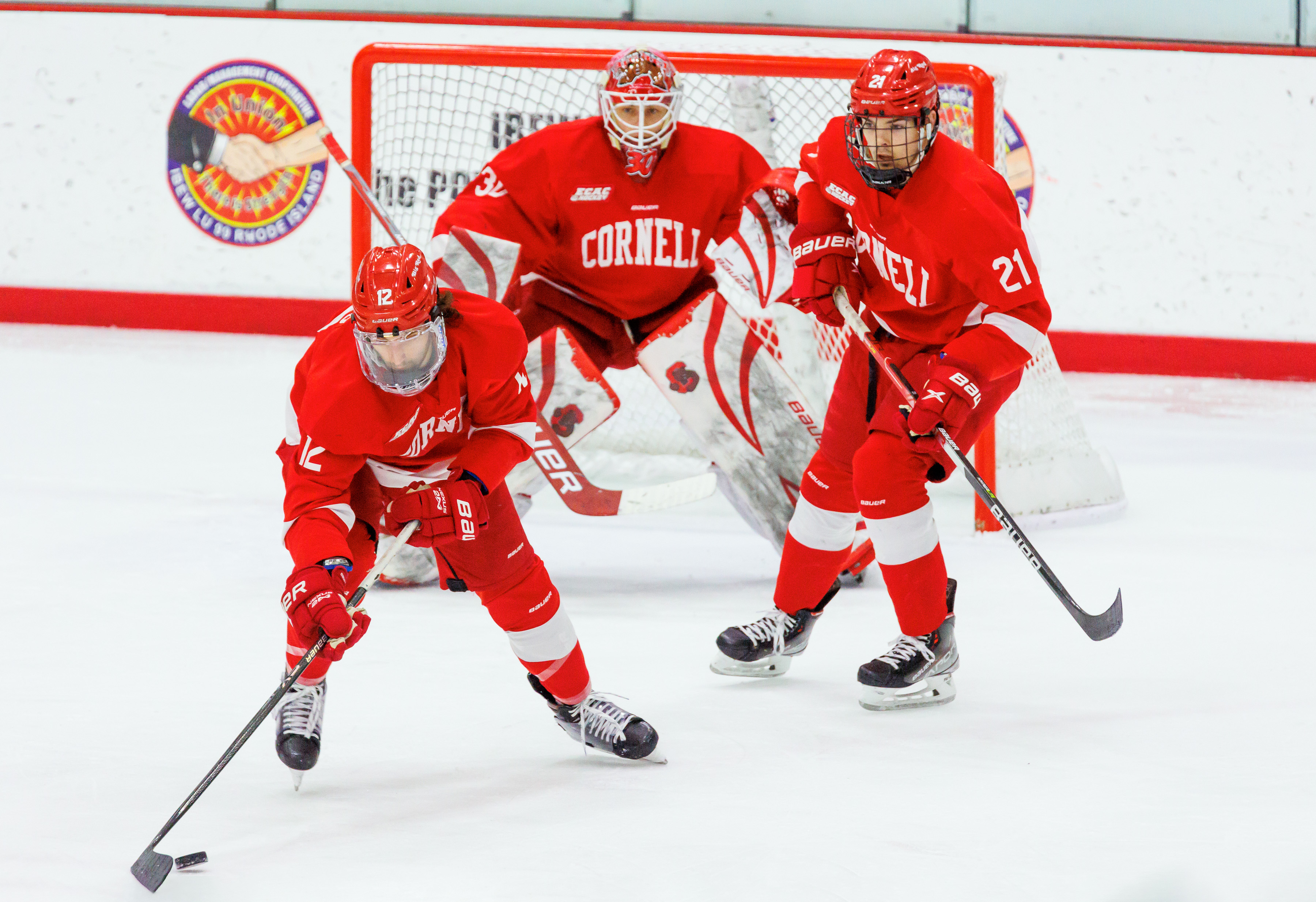
Tim Rego, Ian Shane, Zach Tupker

The 2022–23 Cornell Big Red Men's ice hockey season was the 106th season of play for the program and 61st in ECAC Hockey. The Big Red represented Cornell University in the 2022–23 NCAA Division I men's ice hockey season, were coached by Mike Schafer in his 27th season, and played their home games at Lynah Rink.

== Season ==
Entering the season, was expected to be strong defensive team, as it usually was under Mike Schafer. However, after his health scare in January '22, it remained to be seen if he was still physically able to do the job. While that was being sorted, the team itself was mostly set. Many of the key offensive players from the previous season were returning. Ian Shane was the incumbent starting goaltender, having won the job in the second half of '22 while co-captains Sam Malinski and Travis Mitchell were leading the defense.

Despite all of the returning brain trust, Cornell was slow off the mark and got swept by Minnesota Duluth to open their season. Their performance was a little better over the following two weeks but the Big Red were still a bit off, only able to earn splits. It wasn't until min-November that the team was able to sort itself out and consistently put forth a solid effort. Over a 2-month span, the Big Red went 8–1–1 to recover their position in the polls, losing only against arch-rival Harvard. During that run, the Big Red returned to their stifling defensive style and severely limiting chances against Shane. Over the course of the season, Cornell averaged under 21 shots against per game, one of the best marks in the nation, and allowed less than 2 goals against per game.

Cornell continued to play strong in the second half, winning its way into the top 10 by taking down then #1 Quinnipiac. The Big Red handed the Bobcats just their second loss on the season and put themselves into a solid position for an at-large bid. A slight slip up at the end of the season pushed the Big Red into the bubble but, as they still had the conference tournament, there was no need to panic. Cornell won its 25th Ivy League title after defeating Yale in its final game of the regular season. They were able to do this despite being swept by, and having a worse record than, Harvard because two of the Crimson's victories came in overtime while the Big Red received full points for all 8 of their wins.

The postseason began with Cornell sitting at home and awaiting their opponent as the Big Red received a bye into the quarterfinals. Because of their spot in the NCAA bubble, the Big Red needed to win the first round matchup. Unfortunately, they ended up drawing Clarkson, who had already defeated them twice during the regular season. Luckily, Cornell was able to overcome recent history and the team played lock-down defense stop the Golden Knights from generating much in the way of offense. Clarkson ended up getting just 36 shots on goal in two games while the Cornell power play lifted them to consecutive wins and a trip to the semifinals. While the wins did little improve Cornell's PairWise ranking, several other teams vying for the postseason had lost in their tournaments and all bug guaranteed the Big Red a spot in the tournament.

The semifinal pitted Cornell against Harvard and the two long-time rivals fought a furious battle of contrasting styles. As stout as Cornell's defense was, Harvard had a high-powered offense and forced the Big Red to defend hard all game. While they were able to hold off the Crimson attack, that meant limiting their own chances. After 60 minutes neither team was able to score and the match headed into overtime. Harvard continued to press, forcing the Big Red to defend the entire time. In four and a half minutes, Harvard got 5 shots on goal to Cornell's 0 with the final being the game-winner. The loss was disappointing but, once all the tournaments were sorted out, Cornell was above the cut line and returned to the NCAA field for the first time in 4 years.

Cornell received a 4-seed, but got the best possible draw by being set opposite to Denver. The Pioneers' offense had faltered in their own postseason run and that continued into the match with the Big Red. Jack O'Leary opened the scoring less than 3 minutes into the game and that was all Cornell needed. While Ben Berard added a second marker several minutes later, Ian Shane stopped all 27 shots to produce just the second shutout victory in program history and the first since Ken Dryden in 1967. The region final saw the Big Red set against another old rival in Boston University and the match was a defensive struggle from the start. combined the two team were able to get just 35 shots on goal but it was the Terriers who managed to score first. Cornell's lack of star power up front prevented them from making a strong comeback and when BU got a 2–0 lead in the third the outcome seemed bleak. With Shane on the bench for an extra attacker, Dalton Bancroft cut the lead in half with 28 seconds left in regulation. Unfortunately, the team was unable to find the tying goal in the waning moments and saw their season come to an end.

== Departures ==
Player	Position	Nationality	Cause
Kyle Betts	Forward	Canada	Graduation (signed with Utah Grizzlies)
Zach Bramwell	Forward	Canada	Graduation (retired)
Justin Ertel	Forward	Canada	Returned to juniors (North Bay Battalion)
Cody Haiskanen	Defenseman	United States	Graduation (signed with Idaho Steelheads)
Joe Howe	Goaltender	Canada	Signed professional contract (Toronto Marlies)
Brenden Locke	Forward	Canada	Graduation (signed with Trois-Rivières Lions)
Nate McDonald	Goaltender	Canada	Graduate transfer to Guelph
Dan McIntyre	Forward	Canada	Left program (retired)
Liam Motley	Forward	Canada	Graduation (retired)
Benjamin Tupker	Forward	Canada	Transferred to Union

== Recruiting ==
Player	Position	Nationality	Age	Notes
Dalton Bancroft	Forward	Canada	21	Centre Hastings, ON
Nick DeSantis	Forward	United States	20	Collegeville, PA
Sean Donaldson	Forward	Canada	21	Vancouver, BC
Remington Keopple	Goaltender	United States	20	Hudson, WI
Ryan McInchak	Goaltender	United States	23	Trenton, MI; transfer from American International
Jack O'Brien	Defenseman	Canada	19	White Rock, BC
Gabriel Seger	Forward	Sweden	22	Uppsala, SWE; transfer from Union
Winter Wallace	Forward	United States	20	Boulder, CO

== Roster ==
As of September 1, 2022.

No.	Nat.	Player	Class	Pos	Height	Weight	DoB	Hometown	Previous team	NHL rights
2	(Canada)	Peter Muzyka	Senior	D	6' 3" (1.91 m)	194 lb (88 kg)	2000-05-14	Toronto, Ontario	New Mexico Ice Wolves (NAHL)	—
3	(Canada)	Jack O'Brien	Freshman	D	6' 0" (1.83 m)	170 lb (77 kg)	2003-03-07	White Rock, British Columbia	Nanaimo Clippers (BCHL)	—
4	(United States)	Hank Kempf	Sophomore	D	6' 2" (1.88 m)	200 lb (91 kg)	2002-04-15	Wilmette, Illinois	Muskegon Lumberjacks (USHL)	NYR, 208th overall 2021
5	(Canada)	Sebastian Dirven	Senior	D	6' 3" (1.91 m)	205 lb (93 kg)	1998-06-22	Bainsville, Ontario	Central Illinois Flying Aces (USHL)	—
7	(United States)	Jimmy Rayhill	Sophomore	D	5' 9" (1.75 m)	175 lb (79 kg)	2001-03-17	New Hartford, New York	Odessa Jackalopes (NAHL)	—
8	(United States)	Jack Lagerstrom	Junior	D	6' 2" (1.88 m)	177 lb (80 kg)	2000-03-30	Edina, Minnesota	Tri-City Storm (USHL)	—
9	(United States)	Jack O'Leary	Sophomore	F	5' 7" (1.7 m)	162 lb (73 kg)	2000-03-28	St. James, New York	Lincoln Stars (USHL)	—
10	(United States)	Travis Mitchell (C)	Senior	D	6' 3" (1.91 m)	207 lb (94 kg)	1999-11-25	South Lyon, Michigan	Omaha Lancers (USHL)	—
11	(Canada)	Sean Donaldson	Freshman	F	5' 11" (1.8 m)	180 lb (82 kg)	2001-03-28	Vancouver, British Columbia	Nanaimo Clippers (BCHL)	—
12	(United States)	Tim Rego	Sophomore	D	6' 0" (1.83 m)	172 lb (78 kg)	2000-10-31	Mansfield, Massachusetts	Brooks Bandits (AJHL)	—
13	(United States)	Jack Malone	Senior	F	6' 1" (1.85 m)	193 lb (88 kg)	2000-10-13	Madison, New Jersey	Youngstown Phantoms (USHL)	VAN, 180th overall 2019
15	(Russia)	Max Andreev (A)	Senior	F	6' 0" (1.83 m)	182 lb (83 kg)	1998-10-22	Moscow, Russia	Central Illinois Flying Aces (USHL)	—
16	(Sweden)	Gabriel Seger	Junior	F	6' 4" (1.93 m)	210 lb (95 kg)	1999-11-15	Uppsala, Sweden	Union (ECAC)	—
17	(Canada)	Dalton Bancroft	Freshman	F	6' 3" (1.91 m)	200 lb (91 kg)	2001-02-26	Madoc, Ontario	Trenton Golden Hawks (OJHL)	—
18	(Canada)	Kyler Kovich	Sophomore	F	6' 2" (1.88 m)	182 lb (83 kg)	2002-01-31	Coquitlam, British Columbia	Tri-City Storm (USHL)	—
19	(United States)	Sullivan Mack	Sophomore	F	6' 1" (1.85 m)	189 lb (86 kg)	2000-07-05	Anchorage, Alaska	Salmon Arm Silverbacks (BCHL)	—
20	(Canada)	Matt Stienburg (A)	Senior	F	6' 2" (1.88 m)	195 lb (88 kg)	2000-10-07	Halifax, Nova Scotia	St. Andrew's College (CISAA)	COL, 63rd overall 2019
21	(Canada)	Zach Tupker	Senior	F	6' 1" (1.85 m)	187 lb (85 kg)	1999-12-23	Collingwood, Ontario	Carleton Place Canadians (CCHL)	—
22	(Canada)	Kyle Penney	Sophomore	F	6' 1" (1.85 m)	204 lb (93 kg)	2000-07-18	Lawrencetown, Nova Scotia	Chilliwack Chiefs (BCHL)	—
23	(United States)	Winter Wallace	Freshman	F	6' 3" (1.91 m)	215 lb (98 kg)	2002-01-21	Boulder, Colorado	Youngstown Phantoms (USHL)	—
24	(United States)	Sam Malinski (C)	Senior	D	5' 11" (1.8 m)	189 lb (86 kg)	1998-07-27	Lakeville, Minnesota	Bismarck Bobcats (NAHL)	—
26	(Czech Republic)	Ondřej Pšenička	Sophomore	F	6' 6" (1.98 m)	211 lb (96 kg)	2001-01-07	Prague, Czech Republic	Waterloo Black Hawks (USHL)	—
27	(United States)	Michael Suda	Sophomore	D	6' 1" (1.85 m)	180 lb (82 kg)	2002-07-03	Cheektowaga, New York	Fargo Force (USHL)	—
28	(United States)	Nick DeSantis	Freshman	F	5' 9" (1.75 m)	155 lb (70 kg)	2002-05-02	Collegeville, Pennsylvania	Madison Capitols (USHL)	—
29	(Canada)	Ben Berard	Junior	F	6' 0" (1.83 m)	192 lb (87 kg)	1999-02-13	Duncan, British Columbia	Powell River Kings (BCHL)	—
30	(United States)	Ian Shane	Sophomore	G	6' 0" (1.83 m)	170 lb (77 kg)	2000-09-24	Manhattan Beach, California	Bismarck Bobcats (USHL)	—
33	(United States)	Remington Keopple	Freshman	G	6' 2" (1.88 m)	190 lb (86 kg)	2002-03-21	Somerset, Wisconsin	Des Moines Buccaneers (USHL)	—
34	(United States)	Ryan McInchak	Junior	G	6' 0" (1.83 m)	175 lb (79 kg)	1999-02-28	Trenton, Michigan	American International (AHA)	—

== Standings ==
2022–23 ECAC Hockey Standings
	Conference record										Overall record					
	GP	W	L	T	OTW	OTL	SW	PTS	GF	GA	GP	W	L	T	GF	GA
#1 Quinnipiac †	22	20	2	0	0	0	0	60	87	30	41	34	4	3	162	64
#10 Harvard	22	18	4	0	5	0	0	49	86	48	34	24	8	2	125	81
#9 Cornell	22	15	6	1	0	1	0	47	78	42	34	21	11	2	112	66
St. Lawrence	22	12	10	0	1	2	0	37	56	58	36	17	19	0	88	102
#18 Colgate *	22	11	8	3	4	1	3	36	71	58	40	19	16	5	113	109
Clarkson	22	9	10	3	0	1	0	31	60	60	37	16	17	4	102	98
Rensselaer	22	9	13	0	2	1	0	26	52	74	35	14	20	1	84	115
Union	22	8	13	1	0	0	1	26	45	68	35	14	19	2	86	117
Princeton	22	8	14	0	2	1	0	26	57	73	32	13	19	0	89	112
Yale	22	6	14	2	0	1	1	22	35	62	32	8	20	4	57	94
Brown	22	5	14	3	0	1	1	20	41	69	30	9	18	3	65	91
Dartmouth	22	4	17	1	0	2	1	16	44	70	30	5	24	1	64	106
Championship: March 18, 2023 † indicates conference regular season champion (Cleary Cup) * indicates conference tournament champion (Whitelaw Cup); Rankings: USCHO.com Top 20 Poll

== Schedule and results ==
Date	Time	Opponent^{#}	Rank^{#}	Site	TV	Decision	Result	Attendance	Record
Exhibition
October 15	7:00 PM	Ottawa*	#19	Lynah Rink • Ithaca, New York (Exhibition)	ESPN+	Shane	W 5–1	948	
October 20	7:00 PM	Guelph*	#20	Lynah Rink • Ithaca, New York (Exhibition)	ESPN+	Shane	W 8–1	739	
Regular Season
October 28	8:00 PM	at #19 Minnesota Duluth*	#20	AMSOIL Arena • Duluth, Minnesota	MY9	Shane	L 2–3	4,158	0–1–0
October 29	8:00 PM	at #19 Minnesota Duluth*	#20	AMSOIL Arena • Duluth, Minnesota	MY9	Keopple	L 2–4	4,395	0–2–0
November 4	7:00 PM	at Princeton		Hobey Baker Memorial Rink • Princeton, New Jersey	ESPN+	Shane	W 3–1	2,171	1–2–0 (1–0–0)
November 5	7:00 PM	at #7 Quinnipiac		M&T Bank Arena • Hamden, Connecticut	ESPN+	Shane	L 0–2	3,439	1–3–0 (1–1–0)
November 11	7:00 PM	at St. Lawrence		Appleton Arena • Canton, New York	ESPN+	Shane	W 5–1	1,395	2–3–0 (2–1–0)
November 12	7:00 PM	at Clarkson		Cheel Arena • Potsdam, New York	ESPN+	Shane	L 1–4	2,782	2–4–0 (2–2–0)
November 18	7:00 PM	Yale		Lynah Rink • Ithaca, New York	ESPN+	Shane	W 5–2	3,717	3–4–0 (3–2–0)
November 19	7:00 PM	Brown		Lynah Rink • Ithaca, New York	ESPN+	Keopple	W 5–1	3,695	4–4–0 (4–2–0)
November 22	7:00 PM	Sacred Heart*		Lynah Rink • Ithaca, New York	ESPN+	Shane	W 2–1	2,772	5–4–0
November 26	8:00 PM	vs. #6 Connecticut*		Madison Square Garden • Manhattan, New York (The Frozen Apple)	ESPN+	Shane	W 6–0	12,247	6–4–0
December 2	7:00 PM	#7 Harvard		Lynah Rink • Ithaca, New York (Rivalry)	ESPN+	Shane	L 1–2	4,267	6–5–0 (4–3–0)
December 3	7:00 PM	Dartmouth		Lynah Rink • Ithaca, New York	ESPN+	Shane	W 1–0	4,267	7–5–0 (5–3–0)
December 29	7:00 PM	American International*		Lynah Rink • Ithaca, New York	ESPN+	Shane	W 8–4	2,927	8–5–0
December 30	7:00 PM	American International*		Lynah Rink • Ithaca, New York	ESPN+	Shane	T 3–3 ^{OT}	3,024	8–5–1
January 6	7:00 PM	at Union	#18	Achilles Rink • Schenectady, New York	ESPN+	Shane	W 6–1	2,185	9–5–1 (6–3–0)
January 7	4:00 PM	at Rensselaer	#18	Houston Field House • Troy, New York	ESPN+	Shane	W 6–4	2,724	10–5–1 (7–3–0)
January 14	4:00 PM	at #7 Boston University	#15	Agganis Arena • Boston, Massachusetts (Rivalry)	ESPN+	Shane	L 3–4	5,346	10–6–1
January 20	7:00 PM	#1 Quinnipiac	#16	Lynah Rink • Ithaca, New York	ESPN+	Shane	W 4–0	3,794	11–6–1 (8–3–0)
January 21	7:00 PM	Princeton	#16	Lynah Rink • Ithaca, New York	ESPN+	Shane	W 3–2	4,267	12–6–1 (9–3–0)
January 27	7:00 PM	at Dartmouth	#11	Thompson Arena • Hanover, New Hampshire	ESPN+	Shane	W 3–2	2,001	13–6–1 (10–3–0)
January 28	7:00 PM	at #10 Harvard	#11	Bright-Landry Hockey Center • Boston, Massachusetts (Rivalry)	ESPN+	Shane	L 2–6	3,095	13–7–1 (10–4–0)
February 3	7:00 PM	Rensselaer	#11	Lynah Rink • Ithaca, New York	ESPN+	Shane	W 3–1	3,723	14–7–1 (11–4–0)
February 4	7:00 PM	Union	#11	Lynah Rink • Ithaca, New York	ESPN+	Shane	W 10–1	3,903	15–7–1 (12–4–0)
February 10	7:00 PM	Colgate	#11	Lynah Rink • Ithaca, New York	ESPN+	Shane	W 3–2	4,267	16–7–1 (13–4–0)
February 11	7:00 PM	at Colgate	#11	Class of 1965 Arena • Hamilton, New York	ESPN+	Keopple	T 4–4 ^{SOL}	2,271	16–7–2 (13–4–1)
February 17	7:00 PM	Clarkson	#11	Lynah Rink • Ithaca, New York	ESPN+	Shane	L 3–4	3,102	16–8–2 (13–5–1)
February 18	7:00 PM	St. Lawrence	#11	Lynah Rink • Ithaca, New York	ESPN+	Shane	L 0–1	4,267	16–9–2 (13–6–1)
February 24	7:00 PM	at Brown	#13	Meehan Auditorium • Providence, Rhode Island	ESPN+	Shane	W 5–0	1,177	17–9–2 (14–6–1)
February 25	7:00 PM	at Yale	#13	Ingalls Rink • New Haven, Connecticut	ESPN+	Shane	W 5–1	2,837	18–9–2 (15–6–1)
ECAC Hockey Tournament
March 10	7:00 PM	Clarkson*	#12	Lynah Rink • Ithaca, New York (Quarterfinal Game 1)	ESPN+	Shane	W 2–1	3,752	19–9–2
March 11	7:00 PM	Clarkson*	#12	Lynah Rink • Ithaca, New York (Quarterfinal Game 2)	ESPN+	Shane	W 3–1	3,935	20–9–2
March 17	7:30 PM	vs. #6 Harvard*	#10	Herb Brooks Arena • Lake Placid, New York (Semifinal, Rivalry)	ESPN+	Shane	L 0–1 ^{OT}	3,533	20–10–2
NCAA Tournament
March 23	5:30 PM	vs. #4 Denver*	#12	SNHU Arena • Manchester, New Hampshire (East Regional Semifinal)	ESPNews	Shane	W 2–0	3,631	21–10–2
March 25	4:00 PM	vs. #5 Boston University*	#12	SNHU Arena • Manchester, New Hampshire (East Regional Final; Rivalry)	ESPNU	Shane	L 1–2	7,143	21–11–2
*Non-conference game. ^{#}Rankings from USCHO.com Poll. All times are in Eastern Time. Source:

== Scoring statistics ==
Name	Position	Games	Goals	Assists	Points	PIM
Gabriel Seger	C/LW	30	7	23	30	19
Ben Berard	LW	34	11	17	28	8
Sam Malinski	D	34	8	18	26	29
Max Andreev	F	31	6	16	22	24
Dalton Bancroft	RW	33	9	12	21	19
Nick DeSantis	F	30	9	11	20	12
Travis Mitchell	D	34	6	13	19	20
Kyle Penney	C	33	7	11	18	4
Jack Malone	RW/C	34	8	9	17	6
Jack O'Leary	F	29	6	11	17	8
Ondřej Pšenička	RW	34	8	7	15	10
Zach Tupker	C	34	6	5	11	20
Sullivan Mack	F	25	6	4	10	8
Sean Donaldson	LW	22	3	7	10	0
Tim Rego	D	33	2	7	9	16
Winter Wallace	RW	23	3	5	8	18
Matt Stienburg	C	18	2	5	7	18
Michael Suda	D	33	1	6	7	8
Sebastian Dirven	D	34	1	4	5	23
Kyler Kovich	LW	16	1	2	3	4
Jack Lagerstrom	D	7	1	1	2	4
Hank Kempf	D	31	1	1	2	10
Jack O'Brien	D	1	0	0	0	0
Ryan McInchak	G	2	0	0	0	0
Remington Keopple	G	5	0	0	0	0
Ian Shane	G	33	0	0	0	2
Total			112	195	307	290

== Goaltending statistics ==
Name	Games	Minutes	Wins	Losses	Ties	Goals against	Saves	Shut outs	SV %	GAA
Ian Shane	33	1852:53	20	10	1	53	581	5	.916	1.72
Remington Keopple	5	174:28	1	1	1	9	52	0	.852	3.10
Ryan McInchak	3	11:21	0	0	0	1	2	0	.667	5.29
Empty Net	-	16:57	-	-	-	3	-	-	-	-
Total	34	2055:39	21	11	1	66	635	5	.906	1.93

== Rankings ==
Poll	Week																											
Poll	Pre	1	2	3	4	5	6	7	8	9	10	11	12	13	14	15	16	17	18	19	20	21	22	23	24	25	26	27 (Final)
USCHO.com	19	-	19	19	20	20	NR	NR	NR	NR	NR	NR	NR	-	18	15	16	11	11	11	11	13	12	12	10	12	-	9
USA Today	19	19	19	19	19	20	NR	NR	NR	NR	NR	20	20	NR	17	14	12	11	11	11	11	13	13	13	11	12	9	9

Note: USCHO did not release a poll in weeks 1, 13, or 26.

== Awards and honors ==
Player	Award	Ref
Sam Malinski	AHCA All-American East Second Team	
Sam Malinski	ECAC Hockey First Team	

== Players drafted into the NHL ==
=== 2023 NHL entry draft ===
Round	Pick	Player	NHL team
3	70	Jonathan Castagna ^{†}	Arizona Coyotes
4	108	Hoyt Stanley ^{†}	Ottawa Senators
6	188	Ryan Walsh ^{†}	Boston Bruins

† incoming freshman
