= Jerry Lafond =

Canadian ice hockey player

- Born: August 21, 1944 Dawson Creek, British Columbia, Canada
- Died: April 23, 2022 (aged 77) Dawson Creek, BC
- Height: 6 ft 1 in (185 cm)
- Weight: 190 lb (86 kg; 13 st 8 lb)
- Position: Defenseman
- Played for: North Dakota; Providence Reds; Denver Spurs
- NHL draft: Undrafted
- Playing career: 1964–1971

Jerry Lafond is a Canadian retired ice hockey defenseman who was an All-American for North Dakota.

== Career ==
Lafond began his tenure with the varsity team at North Dakota in 1964. In his first season with the program Lafond scored 14 points and helped the Fighting Sioux jump from 5th place to 1st in the WCHA and finish as runner-up for the conference championship. The team received the second western seed and finished third in the NCAA Tournament. UND declined a bit the following year, posting a 13–9 mark in conference play and tied for second place. During the season Lafond became the first defenseman in program history to record a hat-trick, which he did on November 27. North Dakota escaped an unenviable draw in the conference first round and pushed a tough Denver team into overtime, but lost the match 3–4.

Lafond was named team co-captain for his senior season and the Fighting Sioux ended atop the WCHA once again. Lafond was named to both the All-WCHA First Team and the All-American team. With the team being the lowest-scoring team in the conference (106 goals in 29 games), North Dakota was highly dependent on Lafond and the defensive corps holding opposing attackers at bay. After winning both games in the WCHA Tournament North Dakota won its first ever conference championship, sharing the crown with Michigan State. UND was placed opposite ECAC Hockey champion Cornell and the offensive troubles continued, UND was unable to score a single goal on Ken Dryden and, despite a valiant effort by Lafond et al., the single goal North Dakota allowed was one too many. The team finished the tournament in fourth place after a dismal effort against MSU.

Lafond continued his playing career after graduating and moved east. He played two seasons as a professional with the Providence Reds, then two more seasons as an amateur, first with the Denver Spurs and then in his home town with the Dawson Creek Canucks.

== Career statistics ==
=== Regular season and playoffs ===
| | | | Regular Season | | | | | Playoffs |
| Season | Team | League | GP | G | A | Pts | PIM | GP | G | A | Pts | PIM |
|---|---|---|---|---|---|---|---|---|---|---|---|---|
| 1964–65 | North Dakota | WCHA | 33 | 1 | 13 | 14 | 20 | — | — | — | — | — |
| 1965–66 | North Dakota | WCHA | 28 | 7 | 12 | 19 | 0 | — | — | — | — | — |
| 1966–67 | North Dakota | WCHA | 29 | 5 | 10 | 15 | 26 | — | — | — | — | — |
| 1967–68 | Providence Reds | AHL | 56 | 0 | 23 | 23 | 24 | 8 | 0 | 1 | 1 | 2 |
| 1968–69 | Providence Reds | AHL | 60 | 1 | 10 | 11 | 14 | 9 | 0 | 0 | 0 | 2 |
| 1969–70 | Denver Spurs | WHL | 71 | 8 | 14 | 22 | 26 | — | — | — | — | — |
| 1970–71 | Dawson Creek Canucks | CarHL | — | — | — | — | — | — | — | — | — | — |
| NCAA totals | | | 90 | 13 | 35 | 48 | 46 | — | — | — | — | — |
| AHL totals | | | 116 | 1 | 33 | 34 | 38 | 17 | 0 | 1 | 1 | 4 |

== Awards and honors ==
| Award | Year |
|---|---|
| All-WCHA First Team | 1966–67 |
| AHCA West All-American | 1966–67 |
