= Brian Gilmour (ice hockey) =

Canadian ice hockey player

- Born: Lancaster, Ontario, Canada
- Height: 5 ft 10 in (178 cm)
- Weight: 185 lb (84 kg; 13 st 3 lb)
- Position: Defenseman
- Played for: Boston University
- NHL draft: Undrafted
- Playing career: 1964–1967

Brian O. Gilmour is a Canadian retired ice hockey defenseman and coach who was an All-American for Boston University.

== Career ==
Gilmour was an all-star as a junior player and became a prized recruit for Jack Kelley. He began playing varsity hockey at Boston University in 1964 and the team went from 9 wins the year before up to 25 and finished atop the ECAC Hockey standings. An offensive defenseman by trade, Gilmour helped the Terriers score nearly 90 more goals during his sophomore season while also keeping the puck away from his net. BU finished third in the ECAC Tournament, narrowly missing out on a national tournament appearance. Gilmour continued to improve as a junior, increasing his point total and pushing Boston University up to 27 wins, setting a new program record. While the Terriers again finished 3rd in the ECAC Tournament, they received a bid to the NCAA Tournament when Cornell declined theirs. Gilmour's team was close in both games but ultimately lost both by one goal and finished last in the tournament.

As a senior Gilmour became the leader of the defense, after the graduation of Tom Ross. He helped BU finish undefeated in conference play and capture a second ECAC crown with a 19–0–1 record. Gilmour set program record for defensemen by scoring 54 points during the season. He also scored his 36th career goal, establishing a BU record that still stands (as of 2019). Gilmour became the first Terrier defender to record 100 career points and led the national scoring by a blue liner, end up 10th in the nation. He was named Second Team All-ECAC and an All-American. BU was the top-seeded team for the ECAC Tournament and the Terriers finally managed to reach the championship game, however, they were stymied by Cornell 3–4 and had to settle for the runner-up position. Gilmour was named to the All-Tournament First Team and the Terriers returned to the national tournament. The team was able to avenge their loos a year earlier by defeating Michigan State in the semifinal and reaching their first title game since 1950. In Gilmour's final game the team's offense could only muster a single goal and the Terriers were again defeated by Cornell. He was named to the All-Tournament Second Team

After graduating, Gilmour returned to Canada and became the head coach for the McGill Redmen, remaining with the team for three seasons before heading to Cornwall to become a teacher at General Vanier Secondary School. The same year he founded Huron Hockey School and remained involved with the venture until 1997. When the WHA was founded in 1972 Gilmour became a scout for the New England Whalers for a couple years and he later served as an assistant coach for the Cornwall Royals. Gilmour was inducted into the Boston University Athletic Hall of Fame in 1997 and the Cornwall Sports Hall of Fame in 2000.

== Career statistics ==
=== Regular season and playoffs ===
			Regular Season					Playoffs
Season	Team	League	GP	G	A	Pts	PIM	GP	G	A	Pts	PIM
1962–63	Verdun Maple Leafs	MJHL	—	—	—	—	—	—	—	—	—	—
1964–65	Boston University	ECAC Hockey	31	11	19	30	24	—	—	—	—	—
1965–66	Boston University	ECAC Hockey	35	12	27	39	52	—	—	—	—	—
1966–67	Boston University	ECAC Hockey	29	13	41	54	32	—	—	—	—	—
NCAA Totals			95	36	87	123	108	—	—	—	—	—

== Awards and honors ==
Award	Year
All-ECAC Hockey Second Team	1966–67
AHCA East All-American	1966–67
ECAC Hockey All-Tournament First Team	1967
All-NCAA All-Tournament Second Team	1967
