= Harry Orr =

Canadian ice hockey player (1944–2019)

- Born: November 18, 1944 Port Credit, Ontario, Canada
- Died: July 27, 2019 (aged 74)
- Height: 5 ft 9 in (175 cm)
- Weight: 158 lb (72 kg; 11 st 4 lb)
- Position: Defenseman
- Played for: Cornell; Port Huron Flags
- NHL draft: Undrafted
- Playing career: 1964–1968

Henry Andrews "Harry" Orr was a Canadian ice hockey defenseman who was an All-American for Cornell.

== Career ==
Orr was a member of Ned Harkness' first recruiting class when he arrived at Cornell University in 1963. Orr began playing with the varsity team the following fall and provided an instant impact on the blue line, scoring 16 goals as a Sophomore and finishing third on the team in scoring. As a junior Orr's scoring decreased as he focused primarily on keeping the puck away from his goaltender and Cornell became a defensive powerhouse, surrendering just 54 goals in 27 games. Orr was named to the All-ECAC First Team and the team recorded 20 wins for the first time. Orr helped the team to a second-place finish in the ECAC Tournament and was named to the All-Tournament First Team. Due to a disagreement between the Ivy League and the NCAA, Cornell declined its invitation to the national tournament.

The dispute was eventually settled in the offseason and Orr entered his senior season with a chance to compete for a national title, something that Harkness had promised Orr years earlier. The team continued to be the best defensive club in the nation, this time allowing just 46 goals in 29 games, setting a host of NCAA records in the process and finishing the regular season with a 24–1–1 record. Orr was named as an All-American and the ECAC Most Outstanding Defenseman. He was instrumental in Cornell's march through the playoffs, winning the program's first ECAC Championship, and then surrendering just one goal in the NCAA Tournament. Orr was named to the All-Tournament First Teams for both championships and skated away as one of the all-time Cornell greats.

After graduating he played one year of professional hockey before retiring and embarking on a 30-year career in Ministry of Natural Resources. He was inducted into the Cornell Athletic Hall of Fame in 1984.

Harry Orr died in his sleep after a battle with cancer.

== Career statistics ==
=== Regular season and playoffs ===
			Regular Season					Playoffs
Season	Team	League	GP	G	A	Pts	PIM	GP	G	A	Pts	PIM
1962–63	Dixie Beehives	OHA-B	—	—	—	—	—	—	—	—	—	—
1964–65	Cornell	ECAC Hockey	26	16	30	46	28	—	—	—	—	—
1965–66	Cornell	ECAC Hockey	27	5	20	25	50	—	—	—	—	—
1966–67	Cornell	ECAC Hockey	28	5	21	26	81	—	—	—	—	—
1967–68	Port Huron Flags	IHL	56	9	19	28	90	—	—	—	—	—
NCAA Totals			81	26	71	97	159	—	—	—	—	—

== Awards and honors ==
Award	Year
All-ECAC Hockey First Team	1965–66
ECAC Hockey All-Tournament First Team	1966
All-ECAC Hockey First Team	1966–67
AHCA East All-American	1966–67
ECAC Hockey All-Tournament First Team	1967
NCAA All-Tournament Team	1967

Awards and achievements
Preceded by Robert Gaudreau	ECAC Hockey Outstanding Defenseman; 1966–67	Succeeded by Award Discontinued
