= Wayne Small =

Canadian ice hockey player

- Born: 1945 (age 79–80); Wallaceburg, Ontario, Canada
- Height: 5 ft 8 in (173 cm)
- Weight: 145 lb (66 kg; 10 st 5 lb)
- Position: Wing
- Played for: Brown; Carleton Ravens; ZSC Lions; HC Davos; HC Ambrì-Piotta
- NHL draft: Undrafted
- Playing career: 1965–1980

F. Wayne Small is a Canadian retired ice hockey winger who was an All-American for Brown.

== Career ==
Small's stature mirrored his name. Standing at 5' 8" and weighing less than 150 lbs., he was too slight for most teams and relegated to playing junior B hockey. Despite this, Small was recruited to Brown University and played with the freshman team while the varsity club reached the NCAA tournament. Small played well as a junior, helping the team to a 4th-place finish in the conference while scoring more than a point per game but it was during his junior year that he became the team's star. While the team sank in the standings, finishing 8th in 1967, Small nearly doubled his point total, scoring 61 in just 24 games. Small contributed on over 45% of Brown's goals that season and led the nation in scoring with 35 goals. Small's numbers declined in his senior season but he still led the Bears with 50 points. Brown was beaten in the conference quarterfinals, ending Small's NCAA career abruptly, but he was named as the ECAC Hockey Player of the Year and an All-American.

After graduating, Small returned to Canada and attended Carleton University, pursuing his master's degree. He spent three years at the school, and played for the ice hockey team during his tenure. In his first year with the Ravens, Small set the record for the most points in a single season with 38 goals and 63 points. When he left in 1971 he was the program's all-time leading scorer, having netted 83 goals and 148 points in just 64 games. After finishing his college career the high-scoring Small travelled to Europe to continue his playing career. He spent the next 10 seasons playing in Switzerland, mostly for ZSC Lions. He helped Zurich win the NLB championship in 1973 and receive a promotion to the top division. That same year Small was inducted into the Brown Athletic Hall of Fame and he was later placed in Castleton's Hall of Fame.

== Career statistics ==
=== Regular season and playoffs ===
| | | | Regular Season | | | | | Playoffs |
| Season | Team | League | GP | G | A | Pts | PIM | GP | G | A | Pts | PIM |
|---|---|---|---|---|---|---|---|---|---|---|---|---|
| 1962–63 | Leamington Flyers | BCJBHL | — | — | — | — | — | — | — | — | — | — |
| 1963–64 | Wallaceburg Hornets | BCJBHL | — | — | — | — | — | — | — | — | — | — |
| 1965–66 | Brown | ECAC Hockey | 25 | 17 | 16 | 33 | — | — | — | — | — | — |
| 1966–67 | Brown | ECAC Hockey | 24 | 35 | 26 | 61 | — | — | — | — | — | — |
| 1967–68 | Brown | ECAC Hockey | 24 | 16 | 34 | 50 | — | — | — | — | — | — |
| 1968–69 | Carleton | CIAU | — | 38 | 25 | 63 | — | — | — | — | — | — |
| 1969–70 | Carleton | CIAU | — | — | — | — | — | — | — | — | — | — |
| 1970–71 | Carleton | CIAU | — | — | — | — | — | — | — | — | — | — |
| 1971–72 | ZSC Lions | NLB | — | — | — | — | — | — | — | — | — | — |
| 1972–73 | ZSC Lions | NLB | — | — | — | — | — | — | — | — | — | — |
| 1973–74 | ZSC Lions | NLA | — | — | — | — | — | — | — | — | — | — |
| 1974–75 | ZSC Lions | NLB | — | — | — | — | — | — | — | — | — | — |
| 1975–76 | ZSC Lions | NLB | — | — | — | — | — | — | — | — | — | — |
| 1976–77 | ZSC Lions | NLB | — | — | — | — | — | — | — | — | — | — |
| 1977–78 | HC Davos | NLB | — | — | — | — | — | — | — | — | — | — |
| 1978–79 | HC Ambrì-Piotta | NLB | 26 | 26 | 22 | 48 | 18 | — | — | — | — | — |
| 1979–80 | HC Ascona | Swiss Div. 1 | — | — | — | — | — | — | — | — | — | — |
| NCAA Totals | | | 73 | 68 | 76 | 144 | — | — | — | — | — | — |
| CIAU Totals | | | 64 | 83 | 65 | 148 | — | — | — | — | — | — |

== Awards and honors ==
| Award | Year |
|---|---|
| All-ECAC Hockey First Team | 1966–67 |
| All-ECAC Hockey First Team | 1967–68 |
| AHCA East All-American | 1967–68 |

Awards and achievements
| Preceded by Doug Ferguson | ECAC Hockey Player of the Year; 1967–68 | Succeeded by Ken Dryden |
