= 1967 ECAC Hockey men's ice hockey tournament =

1967 ECAC Men's ice hockey tournament
- Dates: March 7–11, 1967
- Teams: 8
- Finals site: Boston Garden; Boston, Massachusetts
- Champions: Cornell (1st title)
- Winning coach: Ned Harkness (1st title)
- MVP: Doug Ferguson (Cornell)
- ECAC Men's Ice Hockey Tournaments

The 1967 ECAC Hockey Men's Ice Hockey Tournament was the 6th tournament in league history. It was played between March 7 and March 11, 1967. Quarterfinal games were played at home team campus sites, while the 'final four' games were played at the Boston Garden in Boston, Massachusetts. By reaching the championship game both, Cornell and Boston University received invitations to participate in the 1967 NCAA University Division Men's Ice Hockey Tournament.

== Format ==
The tournament featured three rounds of play, all of which were single-elimination. The top eight teams, based on conference rankings, qualified to participate in the tournament. In the quarterfinals the first seed and eighth seed, the second seed and seventh seed, the third seed and sixth seed and the fourth seed and fifth seed played against one another. In the semifinals, the winner of the first and eighth matchup played the winner of the fourth and fifth matchup while the other two remaining teams played with the winners advancing to the championship game and the losers advancing to the third place game.

== Conference standings ==
Note: GP = Games played; W = Wins; L = Losses; T = Ties; Pct. = Winning percentage; GF = Goals for; GA = Goals against

1966–67 ECAC Hockey standings
	Conference							Overall					
	GP	W	L	T	Pct.	GF	GA	GP	W	L	T	GF	GA
Boston University†	20	19	0	1	.975	147	48	31	25	5	1	176	66
Cornell*	20	18	1	1	.925	106	32	29	27	1	1	132	46
Boston College	20	14	6	0	.700	121	60	28	20	8	0	171	91
St. Lawrence	15	9	5	1	.633	66	64	26	17	8	1	122	84
Yale	22	13	9	0	.591	117	112	24	13	11	0	119	112
Clarkson	15	8	6	1	.567	78	65	23	14	8	1	127	84
New Hampshire^	9	5	4	0	.556	32	34	25	18	7	0	115	71
Brown	16	8	8	0	.500	88	64	24	13	11	0	135	98
Harvard	21	10	11	0	.476	97	86	23	11	12	0	106	88
Army	11	5	6	0	.455	41	47	27	15	12	0	151	104
Northeastern	20	9	11	0	.450	62	79	26	12	14	0	86	95
Colgate	16	5	11	0	.313	41	87	26	11	15	0	88	130
Princeton	20	6	14	0	.300	85	106	22	7	15	0	92	106
Providence	15	2	13	0	.133	37	111	20	3	17	0	46	136
Dartmouth	15	1	14	0	.067	37	115	20	4	16	0	56	130
Rensselaer	15	1	14	0	.067	58	118	24	8	15	1	106	158
Championship: Cornell † indicates conference regular season champion * indicates conference tournament champion^ New Hampshire had been readmitted to the ECAC but played only a partial schedule and still qualified for the ECAC II playoffs

== Bracket ==
Quarterfinals; March 7
1	Boston University	6
8	Harvard	2
4	St. Lawrence	4
5	Yale	2
2	Cornell	11
7	Brown	2
3	Boston College	9
6	Clarkson	2

Semifinals; March 10
1	Boston University	6
4	St. Lawrence	2
2	Cornell	12
3	Boston College	2

Championship; March 11
1	Boston University	3
2	Cornell	4
Third place
3	Boston College	6
4	St. Lawrence	4

Note: * denotes overtime period(s)

=== Quarterfinals ===
==== (1) Boston University vs. (8) Harvard ====
March 7	Boston University	6 – 2	Harvard	Boston Arena

==== (2) Cornell vs. (7) Brown ====
March 7	Cornell	11 – 2	Brown	Lynah Rink

==== (3) Boston College vs. (6) Clarkson ====
March 7	Boston College	9 – 2	Clarkson	McHugh Forum

==== (4) St. Lawrence vs. (5) Yale ====
March 7	St. Lawrence	4 – 2	Yale	Appleton Arena

=== Semifinals ===
==== (1) Boston University vs. (4) St. Lawrence ====
March 10	Boston University	6 – 2	St. Lawrence	Boston Garden

==== (2) Cornell vs. (3) Boston College ====
March 10	Cornell	12 – 2	Boston College	Boston Garden

=== Third Place ===
==== (3) Boston College vs. (4) St. Lawrence ====
March 11	Boston College	6 – 4	St. Lawrence	Boston Garden

=== Championship ===
==== (1) Boston University vs. (6) Cornell ====
March 11	Boston University	3 – 4	Cornell	Boston Garden

== Tournament awards ==
=== All-Tournament Team ===
==== First Team ====
- F Mike Doran (Cornell)
- F Jim Quinn (Boston University)
- F Doug Ferguson* (Cornell)
- D Harry Orr (Cornell)
- D Brian Gilmour (Boston University)
- G Ken Dryden (Cornell)

* Most Outstanding Player(s)

==== Second Team ====
- F Jerry York (Boston College)
- F Herb Wakabayashi (Boston University)
- F Dave Ferguson (Cornell)
- D Peter McLachlan (Boston University)
- D Skip Stanowski (Cornell)
- G Wayne Ryan (Boston University)
