= Keith Christiansen (ice hockey) =

American ice hockey player (1944–2018)

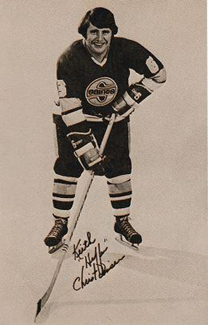
- Born: July 14, 1944 Fort Frances, Ontario, Canada
- Died: November 5, 2018 (aged 74) Duluth, Minnesota, U.S.
- Height: 5 ft 6 in (168 cm)
- Weight: 155 lb (70 kg; 11 st 1 lb)
- Position: Centre
- Shot: Right
- Played for: Minnesota Fighting Saints
- National team: United States
- Playing career: 1972–1974
Medal record
Men's ice hockey
Representing United States
Olympic Games
Silver medal – second place	1972 Sapporo	Team

Keith Raymond "Huffer" Christiansen (July 14, 1944 – November 5, 2018) was a professional ice hockey player who appeared in 138 World Hockey Association (WHA) regular season games with the Minnesota Fighting Saints between 1972 and 1974. Before turning professional, he was a member of the United States' 1972 Winter Olympics team that won the silver medal and also represented the United States at the 1969, 1970 and 1971 Ice Hockey World Championships.

Christiansen was born in Fort Frances, Ontario, Canada. He played hockey in high school for International Falls, Minnesota then went to University of Minnesota Duluth where he was captain of the hockey team. He is one of the more famed UMD Bulldogs; Christensen is in the UMD Hall of Fame and has his number 9, hung in Amsoil Arena where the Bulldogs currently play. He also played with the Waterloo Black Hawks and Grand Rapids Bruins of the United States Hockey League as an amateur.

He was inducted into the United States Hockey Hall of Fame in 2005. Christiansen died in 2018 at the age of 74 from lung cancer.

== Career statistics ==
=== Regular season and playoffs ===
			Regular season					Playoffs
Season	Team	League	GP	G	A	Pts	PIM	GP	G	A	Pts	PIM
1963–64	University of Minnesota Duluth	NCAA	24	16	20	36	58	—	—	—	—	—
1964–65	University of Minnesota Duluth	NCAA	27	23	35	58	63	—	—	—	—	—
1965–66	University of Minnesota Duluth	WCHA	23	13	27	40	52	—	—	—	—	—
1966–67	University of Minnesota Duluth	WCHA	28	23	39	62	85	—	—	—	—	—
1967–68	Waterloo Black Hawks	USHL	––	17	34	51	37	—	—	—	—	—
1968–69	Grand Rapids Bruins	USHL	Statistics Unavailable
1969–70	U.S. National Team	Intl	13	8	10	18	22	—	—	—	—	—
1970–71	U.S. National Team	Intl	47	22	47	69	110	—	—	—	—	—
1971–72	U.S. Olympic Team	Intl	53	21	52	73	91	—	—	—	—	—
1972–73	Minnesota Fighting Saints	WHA	64	12	30	42	24	6	1	0	1	0
1973–74	Minnesota Fighting Saints	WHA	74	11	25	36	36	10	0	1	1	2
WHA totals			138	23	55	78	60	16	1	1	2	2

== Awards and honours ==
Award	Year
All-WCHA First Team	1966–67
AHCA West All-American	1966–67

Awards and achievements
Preceded by Mel Wakabayashi	WCHA Most Valuable Player; 1966–67	Succeeded by Keith Magnuson
