= ECAC Christmas Hockey Tournament =

- Sport: College ice hockey
- Founded: 1966
- Folded: 1972
- No. of teams: 4
- Venue: Boston Garden
- Most titles: Cornell (3)

ECAC Christmas Hockey Tournament was an annual NCAA men's Division I ice hockey tournament held at the Boston Garden in Boston around the Christmas holiday from 1966 to 1972. It was preceded by a similar event, the Boston Garden Christmas Hockey Festival, which was held from 1963 to 1965.

== Boston Garden Christmas Hockey Festival ==
The 1963 Beanpot final between Boston College and Harvard sold out the Boston Garden, with a few thousand more turned away. It was the third consecutive year that the Beanpot had sold out. On February 14, 1963, Boston Garden president Walter A. Brown and vice president and treasurer Edward J. Powers announced the creation of a college hockey festival that would take place that December. The Garden invited the city's four leading hockey teams (Boston College, Harvard, Boston University, and Northeastern) as well as the University of Toronto and Minnesota. The festival would take place around the same time as the ECAC Holiday Hockey Festival in New York City. The first festival took place from December 20–21, and December 23, 1963. It was not a tournament, but instead a trophy was awarded to the most outstanding team. Harvard won both of their games (a 4–1 victory over Toronto and a 5–2 win against Minnesota) and were declared the inaugural champion. Crimson defenseman Gene Kinasewich was awarded the most valuable player award.

The 1964 festival was supposed to feature seven U.S. teams (Boston University, Northeastern, Boston College, Harvard, Providence, Colgate, and RPI) and one Canadian team (Royal Military College of Canada). However, Colgate withdrew shortly before the event began and were replaced by Queen's University. Boston University over came a 3–1 deficit to defeat Queen's University 4–3 and were awarded the Boston Garden Bowl as the most outstanding team.

The third festival featured six teams (Boston University, Boston College, Toronto, Northeastern, Harvard, and Dartmouth). Toronto beat Northeastern 9–1 and Harvard 7–5 and were declared the most outstanding team of the festival. Ward Passi of the Varsity Blues was elected most outstanding player.

== ECAC Christmas Hockey Tournament ==
In 1966, the Boston Garden Christmas Hockey Festival was replaced by the ECAC Holiday Hockey tournament. Defending NCAA champion Michigan State, Boston College, Northeastern, and Cornell were selected to compete in the first tournament. Cornell beat Michigan State 3–2 in overtime to win the inaugural tournament. It was the first of three tournament victories for Cornell, who also won in 1968 and 1970. The tournament was canceled after the 1972 edition due to poor attendance.

=== Yearly results ===
Year	Champion	Runner-up	Third place	Fourth place
1966	Cornell	Michigan State	Boston College	Northeastern
1967	Princeton	Boston College	Northeastern	Dartmouth
1968	Cornell	Boston College	New Hampshire	Princeton
1969	Harvard	Clarkson	Brown	Army
1970	Cornell	Boston College	New Hampshire	Dartmouth
1971	Boston University	RPI	New Hampshire	Northeastern
1972	Dartmouth	Boston College	Merrimack	New Hampshire

=== Most valuable player ===
Year	Winner	Team	Reference
1966	Doug Ferguson	Cornell	
1967	John Ritchie	Princeton	
1968	Ken Dryden; Brian Cornell	Cornell	
1969	Chris Gurry	Harvard	
1970			
1971	Dan Brady	Boston University	
1972	Gordie Clark	New Hampshire	
