= John Morrison (ice hockey, born 1945) =

American ice hockey player and corporate manager

Jack Morrison
- Born: April 6, 1945 (age 81) Minneapolis, Minnesota, U.S.
- Height: 6 ft 0 in (183 cm)
- Weight: 175 lb (79 kg; 12 st 7 lb)
- Position: Center
- Played for: Yale
- National team: United States
- Playing career: 1965–1978

John Lewis "Jack" Morrison (born April 6, 1945) is an American former ice hockey athlete and corporate manager.

== Early life and education ==
Morrison was born in Minneapolis. He attended Phillips Academy, where he captained the hockey and tennis teams. Morrison then graduated from Yale University, where he was the all-time leading scorer for men's hockey with 51 goals and 68 assists, 119 points. He led the team in scoring his senior year with 49 points.

During his time at Yale, Morrison won the William Neely Mallory Award. He is a member of the initial class, along with George H. W. Bush, of the Andover Athletic Hall of Honor. Life profiled Morrison as an outstanding secondary school hockey athlete in 1963.

While attending Yale, he was in the same fraternity as George W. Bush. He later graduated from Harvard Business School.

== Career ==
Morrison was named a first-team All-American at center in 1967, and then captained the United States men's national ice hockey team at the 1968 Winter Olympics. Herb Brooks was a teammate. The Olympic team finished sixth in the competition, with Morrison its leading scorer. Morrison was tied for eighth place in scoring with Marshall Johnston.

Morrison founded an investment firm, Goldner Hawn Johnson & Morrison, in Minneapolis. He had been an executive at Pillsbury before founding Goldner Hawn. From 2005 to 2010, Morrison served as a member of the President's Intelligence Advisory Board in the Bush administration.

== Awards and honors ==
Award	Year
All-ECAC Hockey First Team	1966–67
AHCA East All-American	1966–67
