= Doug Ferguson (ice hockey) =

Canadian ice hockey player

- Born: May 9, 1943 Birsay, Saskatchewan, Canada
- Died: November 10, 2003 (aged 60)
- Height: 5 ft 9 in (175 cm)
- Weight: 170 lb (77 kg; 12 st 2 lb)
- Position: Center
- Played for: Cornell; Saskatoon Quakers; Portland Buckaroos; Salem Rebels; Charlotte Checkers; Syracuse Blazers; Fort Worth Wings; Rochester Americans; Syracuse Eagles
- NHL draft: Undrafted
- Playing career: 1964–1975

Douglas R. Ferguson (born May 9, 1943) was a Canadian ice hockey Center who was a two-time All-American for Cornell and helped the team win its first NCAA Championship.

== Career ==
Ferguson was a prominent junior player for the Melville Millionaires, along his twin brother Dave, in 1963. That summer, Ned Harkness had become the new head coach for Cornell and sought to build a program that could win an national title. He sold his vision to the Ferguson brothers and the pair, with younger brother Bob, all became members of Harkness' first recruiting class for the Big Red. Harkness had already won a championship with RPI in 1954 and there was hope he could replicate that success in Ithaca. Doug, as most players did, sat out his freshman season due to the then-NCAA regulations limiting students to 3 years of varsity play. When he debuted for the team as a sophomore alongside his siblings the program saw an immediate improvement. Doug led the Big Red in scoring, finishing tied for 5th in the nation with 55 points, and Cornell went from a middling 12–10 to a respectable 19–7. The Big Red fell in the team's first ever postseason game, losing 3–4 to Brown in overtime, but Ferguson and the Big Red had only just introduced themselves.

Doug was named team co-captain as a junior and led the Big Red to a stellar season. Ferguson led not only the team but the entire nation in scoring, scoring 71 points and setting a program record with 37 goals (still a Cornell record as of 2020). While Ferguson was named as an All-American and to the All-ECAC First Team, Cornell finished third in ECAC Hockey and the team sought its first conference championship in over 50 years. After obliterating Boston College in the quarterfinals, Cornell shocked Boston University with an 8–1 drubbing in the semifinal. The team wasn't able to overcome Clarkson for the championship, but the 2nd-place finish garnered Cornell an invitation to the 1966 NCAA Tournament. Unfortunately, due to an ongoing argument between the NCAA and the Ivy League over player eligibility, Cornell had to decline the invitation as well as their first appearance in a national tournament.

Fortunately for the Ferguson brothers, the argument was settled prior to the 1966–67 season and Cornell now had a chance to make the championship. Doug became an alternate captain for the year, turning the captaincy over to his twin Dave. the team also welcomed the best player I program history, Ken Dryden, to the varsity team. Dryden had originally been a Princeton recruit before Harkness' plan and the vast improvement by Cornell in Ferguson's sophomore season convinced him to change schools. Doug's scoring declined as a senior and he finished 4th in the nation, though he still led the Big Red with 61 points. The team had become a defensive juggernaut, however, and lost only one game during the regular season. Cornell was unable to win a regular season title, however, because Boston University hadn't lost a single conference game and the two had tied their only meeting on the year. Ferguson was still considered the leader for the team and he was named as the ECAC Player of the Year as well as earning a second stint as an All-American. As they had the year before, Cornell utterly dominated their first two opponents in the ECAC Tournament, winning by a combined score of 23–4. The championship game saw the nation's top two teams face off for the conference title and BU proved to nearly be Cornell's equal. Doug assisted on his brother's goal to open the scoring and then tied the game with a marker of his own at the start of the third. Ferguson's third point of the game came as an assist on Mike Doran's game-winner and Cornell won its first ECAC championship. Ferguson was named as the Most Outstanding Player in Tournament and guaranteed Cornell its first NCAA tournament appearance.

After narrowly escaping a game North Dakota squad in the semifinals, Cornell met Boston University for the third time in the program's first championship game. Ferguson scored his only goal of the tournament on the power play halfway through the game but it was more than enough as Dryden allowed just a single BU goal and Cornell won the national title. Ferguson was named to the All-Tournament Second Team along with his twin and the three Ferguson brothers ended their college careers the best way possible.

Doug continued his playing career after graduating, playing senior hockey for several seasons and eventually won the EHL championship with the Syracuse Blazers in 1973. After that season Ferguson got a chance as a professional with Rochester Americans but he could not find the same success and required after the following season. he was inducted into the Cornell Athletic Hall of Fame in 1979 and currently sits 4th on the program's all-time scoring list despite playing far fewer games than the three players above him.

== Personal life ==
Doug was predeceased by his twin Dave (July 10, 1977) and died on November 10, 2003. Younger brother Bob died on October 3, 2010.

== Career statistics ==
=== Regular season and playoffs ===
==== Ice Hockey ====
			Regular Season					Playoffs
Season	Team	League	GP	G	A	Pts	PIM	GP	G	A	Pts	PIM
1961–62	Prince Albert Mintos	SJHL	—	—	—	—	—	—	—	—	—	—
1962–63	Melville Millionaires	SJHL	—	—	—	—	—	—	—	—	—	—
1964–65	Cornell	ECAC Hockey	26	27	28	55	86	—	—	—	—	—
1965–66	Cornell	ECAC Hockey	27	37	34	71	76	—	—	—	—	—
1966–67	Cornell	ECAC Hockey	29	27	34	61	103	—	—	—	—	—
1967–68	Saskatoon Quakers	WCSHL	—	—	—	—	—	—	—	—	—	—
1968–69	Portland Buckaroos	WHL	5	0	0	0	0	—	—	—	—	—
1968–69	Salem Rebels	EHL	8	1	1	2	0	—	—	—	—	—
1968–69	Charlotte Checkers	EHL	35	13	14	27	42	—	—	—	—	—
1968–69	Syracuse Blazers	EHL	30	10	14	24	63	—	—	—	—	—
1969–70	Syracuse Blazers	EHL	64	24	34	58	212	4	2	3	5	4
1970–71	Syracuse Blazers	EHL	74	32	50	82	190	6	2	7	9	23
1971–72	Fort Worth Wings	CHL	15	1	3	4	16	—	—	—	—	—
1971–72	Syracuse Blazers	EHL	46	19	24	43	117	17	5	6	11	81
1972–73	Syracuse Blazers	EHL	69	30	70	100	103	14	13	12	25	31
1973–74	Rochester Americans	AHL	64	11	19	30	60	—	—	—	—	—
1974–75	Auburn Cayugas	NYAHL	—	—	—	—	—	—	—	—	—	—
1974–75	Syracuse Eagles	AHL	3	0	0	0	26	1	0	0	0	2
NCAA Totals			82	91	96	187	265	—	—	—	—	—
EHL Totals			253	105	178	283	622	41	22	28	50	139

== Awards and honors ==
Award	Year
All-ECAC Hockey Second Team	1964–65
All-ECAC Hockey First Team	1965–66
AHCA East All-American	1965–66
ECAC Hockey All-Tournament First Team	1966
All-ECAC Hockey First Team	1966–67
AHCA East All-American	1966–67
ECAC Hockey All-Tournament First Team	1967
All-NCAA All-Tournament Second Team	1967

Awards and achievements
Preceded by John Cunniff	ECAC Hockey Rookie of the Year; 1964–65	Succeeded by Kent Parrot
Preceded by Terry Yurkiewicz	ECAC Hockey Player of the Year; 1966–67	Succeeded by Wayne Small
Preceded by Terry Yurkiewicz	ECAC Hockey Most Outstanding Player in Tournament; 1967	Succeeded by Ken Dryden
