= 1966–67 NCAA University Division men's ice hockey season =

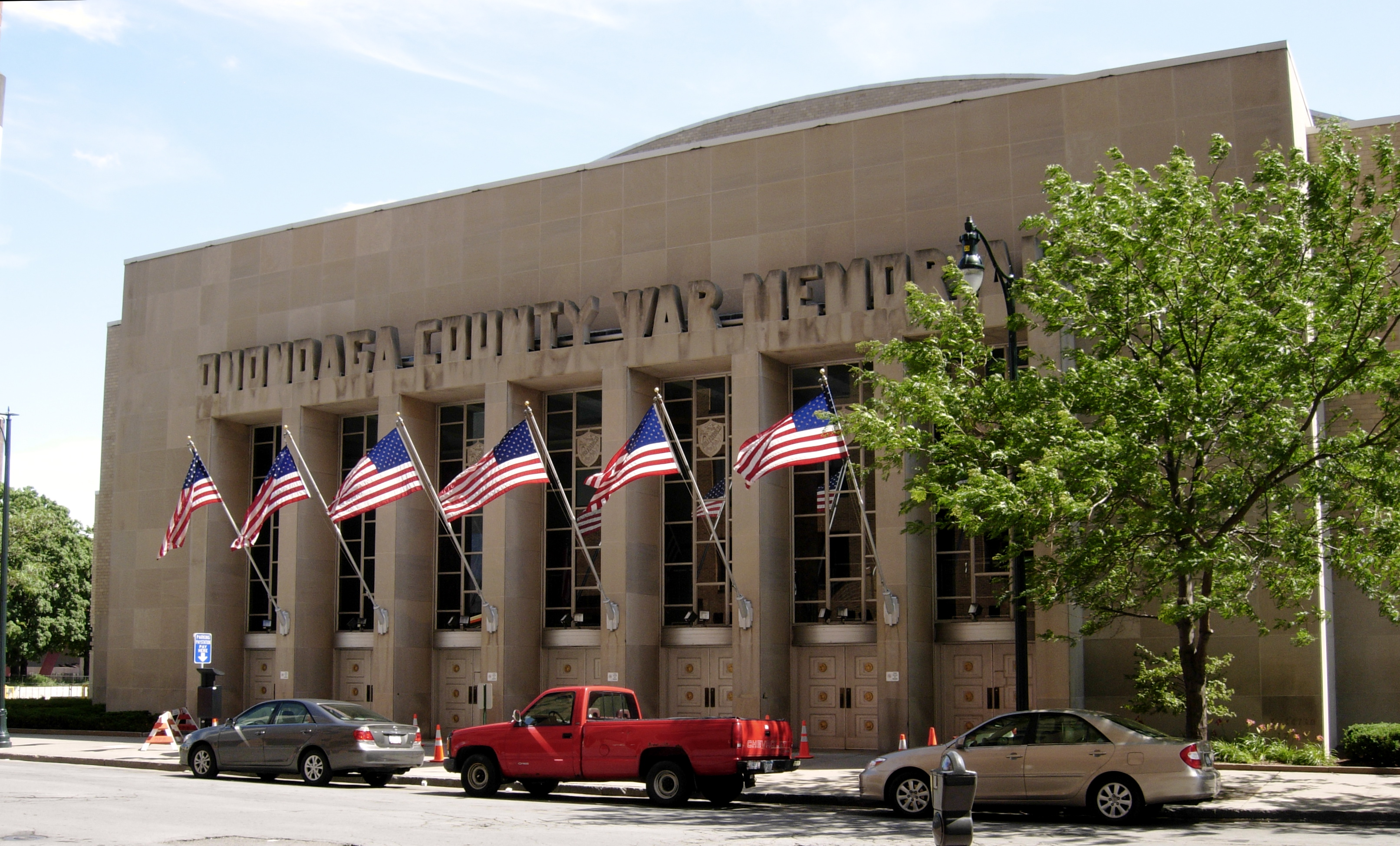
- The Onondaga War Memorial served as the host for the 1967 Tournament
- Duration: November 1966– March 18, 1967
- NCAA tournament: 1967
- National championship: Onondaga County War Memorial; Syracuse, New York
- NCAA champion: Cornell

The 1966–67 NCAA University Division men's ice hockey season began in November 1966 and concluded with the 1967 NCAA University Division Men's Ice Hockey Tournament's championship game on March 18, 1967 at the Onondaga County War Memorial in Syracuse, New York. This was the 20th season in which an NCAA ice hockey championship was held and is the 73rd year overall where an NCAA school fielded a team.

New Hampshire returned to a partial University Division schedule but still qualified for the lower-tier ECAC playoffs for this and the following season. They would become a full-time top division program for the 1968–69 season.

Cornell's win was the first by an eastern team since 1954 ending the 12-year dominance of the WCHA.

On June 7, 1967, Al Karlander became the first NCAA player to be selected in an NHL Draft.

== Regular season ==
=== Season tournaments ===
Tournament	Dates	Teams	Champion
ECAC Christmas Hockey Tournament	December 16–17	4	Cornell
ECAC Holiday Hockey Festival	December 17–20	6	Boston University
Great Lakes Invitational	December 22–23	4	Michigan
Yankee Conference Tournament	December 27–28	4	New Hampshire
St. Paul Hockey Classic	December 28–29	4	Minnesota
Boston Arena Christmas Tournament	December 28–30	4	Boston University, Cornell
Rensselaer Holiday Tournament	December 28–30	4	Michigan
Brown Holiday Tournament	December 29–30	4	Brown
Beanpot	February 9, 13	4	Boston University

=== Standings ===
1966–67 Big Ten standings
	Conference							Overall					
	GP	W	L	T	PTS	GF	GA	GP	W	L	T	GF	GA
Michigan State†	8	5	3	0	10	34	31	32	16	15	1	119	121
Michigan	8	4	3	1	9	44	38	28	19	7	2	150	98
Minnesota	8	2	5	1	5	37	46	29	9	19	1	134	138
† indicates conference regular season champion

1966–67 ECAC Hockey standings
	Conference							Overall					
	GP	W	L	T	Pct.	GF	GA	GP	W	L	T	GF	GA
Boston University†	20	19	0	1	.975	147	48	31	25	5	1	176	66
Cornell*	20	18	1	1	.925	106	32	29	27	1	1	132	46
Boston College	20	14	6	0	.700	121	60	28	20	8	0	171	91
St. Lawrence	15	9	5	1	.633	66	64	26	17	8	1	122	84
Yale	22	13	9	0	.591	117	112	24	13	11	0	119	112
Clarkson	15	8	6	1	.567	78	65	23	14	8	1	127	84
New Hampshire^	9	5	4	0	.556	32	34	25	18	7	0	115	71
Brown	16	8	8	0	.500	88	64	24	13	11	0	135	98
Harvard	21	10	11	0	.476	97	86	23	11	12	0	106	88
Army	11	5	6	0	.455	41	47	27	15	12	0	151	104
Northeastern	20	9	11	0	.450	62	79	26	12	14	0	86	95
Colgate	16	5	11	0	.313	41	87	26	11	15	0	88	130
Princeton	20	6	14	0	.300	85	106	22	7	15	0	92	106
Providence	15	2	13	0	.133	37	111	20	3	17	0	46	136
Dartmouth	15	1	14	0	.067	37	115	20	4	16	0	56	130
Rensselaer	15	1	14	0	.067	58	118	24	8	15	1	106	158
Championship: Cornell † indicates conference regular season champion * indicates conference tournament champion^ New Hampshire had been readmitted to the ECAC but played only a partial schedule and still qualified for the ECAC II playoffs

1966–67 Independent College Athletic Conference standings
	Conference							Overall					
	GP	W	L	T	PTS	GF	GA	GP	W	L	T	GF	GA
St. Lawrence†	4	3	0	1	7	28	17	26	17	8	1	122	84
Clarkson	4	2	1	1	5	26	16	23	14	8	1	127	84
Rensselaer	4	0	4	0	0	15	36	24	8	15	1	106	158
† indicates conference regular season champion

1966–67 NCAA University Division Independent ice hockey standings
	Conference							Overall					
	GP	W	L	T	PTS	GF	GA	GP	W	L	T	GF	GA
Alaska–Fairbanks	0	0	0	0	-	-	-	3	1	2	0	-	-
Ohio State	0	0	0	0	-	-	-	20	10	10	0	81	106
Pennsylvania	0	0	0	0	-	-	-	24	13	11	0		
Wisconsin	0	0	0	0	-	-	-	26	16	10	0	158	89

1966–67 Western Collegiate Hockey Association standings
	Conference							Overall					
	GP	W	L	T	PCT	GF	GA	GP	W	L	T	GF	GA
North Dakota†*	22	16	6	0	.727	84	70	29	19	10	0	106	92
Denver	16	11	5	0	.688	75	47	30	22	8	0	153	89
Michigan Tech	22	14	7	1	.659	96	61	30	18	11	1	125	84
Michigan	18	11	6	1	.639	82	68	28	19	7	2	150	98
Michigan State*	20	8	11	1	.425	72	81	32	16	15	1	119	121
Minnesota-Duluth	23	8	15	0	.348	90	114	28	12	16	0	124	125
Colorado College	18	6	12	0	.333	55	86	29	15	13	1	122	116
Minnesota	23	5	17	1	.239	88	115	29	9	19	1	134	138
Championship: Michigan State, North Dakota † indicates conference regular season champion * indicates conference tournament champion

== 1967 NCAA Tournament ==
Semifinals; March 16–17
E1	Boston University	4
W2	Michigan State	2
W1	North Dakota	0
E2	Cornell	1

National championship March 18
E1	Boston University	1
E2	Cornell	4
Third-place game
W1	North Dakota	1
W2	Michigan State	6

Note: * denotes overtime period(s)

== Player stats ==
=== Scoring leaders ===
The following players led the league in points at the conclusion of the season.

GP = Games played; G = Goals; A = Assists; Pts = Points; PIM = Penalty minutes

Player	Class	Team	GP	G	A	Pts	PIM
Jerry York	Senior	Boston College	28	26	41	67	14
Herb Wakabayashi	Sophomore	Boston University	31	16	51	67	4
Dale Watson	Sophomore	Rensselaer	24	31	34	65	64
Doug Ferguson	Senior	Cornell	29	27	34	64	103
Keith Christiansen	Senior	Minnesota–Duluth	28	23	39	62	85
Wayne Small	Junior	Brown	24	35	26	61	–
Rich Scammell	Sophomore	Rensselaer	24	27	29	55	12
Paul Hurley	Junior	Boston College	28	32	23	55	12
Serge Boily	Sophomore	Boston University	29	29	26	55	21
Brian Gilmour	Senior	Boston University	29	13	41	54	32

=== Leading goaltenders ===
The following goaltenders led the league in goals against average at the end of the regular season while playing at least 33% of their team's total minutes.

GP = Games played; Min = Minutes played; W = Wins; L = Losses; OT = Overtime/shootout losses; GA = Goals against; SO = Shutouts; SV% = Save percentage; GAA = Goals against average

Player	Class	Team	GP	Min	W	L	OT	GA	SO	SV%	GAA
Ken Dryden	Sophomore	Cornell	27	1646	26	0	1	40	4	.945	1.46
Tony Esposito	Senior	Michigan Tech	15	900	-	-	-	39	0	.916	2.60
Rick Metzer	Sophomore	New Hampshire	17	-	-	-	-	-	-	.916	2.84
Wayne Ryan	Senior	Boston University	26	1563	-	-	-	75	0	.900	2.88
Gerry Powers	Sophomore	Denver	30	-	22	8	0	-	1	.879	2.97
Rick Best	Senior	Michigan Tech	15	900	-	-	-	42	1	.895	3.00
Jim Keough	Sophomore	Michigan	15	900	-	-	-	45	2	.907	3.00
John Went	Junior	St. Lawrence	18	980	-	-	-	50	2	.903	3.06
Dave Hagerman	Junior	New Hampshire	14	-	-	-	-	-	-	.884	3.08
Mike Curran	Junior	North Dakota	29	-	-	-	-	-	0	.889	3.11

== Awards ==
=== NCAA ===
Award		Recipient
Spencer Penrose Award		Eddie Jeremiah, Dartmouth
Most Outstanding Player in NCAA Tournament		Skip Stanowski, Cornell
AHCA All-American Teams
East Team	Position	West Team
Ken Dryden, Cornell	G	Tony Esposito, Michigan Tech
	G	Rick Best, Michigan Tech
Brian Gilmour, Boston University	D	Jerry Lafond, North Dakota
Harry Orr, Cornell	D	Bruce Riutta, Michigan Tech
Doug Ferguson, Cornell	F	Keith Christiansen, Minnesota-Duluth
John Morrison, Yale	F	Bob Lindberg, Colorado College
Jerry York, Boston College	F	Gary Milroy, Michigan Tech
	F	Jim Wiste, Denver

=== ECAC ===
Award		Recipient
Player of the Year		Doug Ferguson, Cornell
Rookie of the Year		Herb Wakabayashi, Boston University
Outstanding Defenseman		Harry Orr, Cornell
Most Outstanding Player in Tournament		Doug Ferguson, Cornell
All-ECAC Hockey Teams
First Team	Position	Second Team
Ken Dryden, Cornell	G	Wayne Ryan, Boston University
Harry Orr, Cornell	D	Don Turcotte, Northeastern
Peter McLachlan, Boston University	D	Brian Gilmour, Boston University
John Morrison, Yale	F	Dennis Macks, Brown
Doug Ferguson, Cornell	F	Jerry York, Boston College
Wayne Small, Brown	F	Mike Doran, Cornell

=== WCHA ===
Award		Recipient
Most Valuable Player		Keith Christiansen, Minnesota-Duluth
Sophomore of the Year		Keith Magnuson, Denver
		Bob Munro, North Dakota
Coach of the Year		Bill Selman, North Dakota
All-WCHA Teams
First Team	Position	Second Team
Tony Esposito, Michigan Tech	G	Rick Best, Michigan Tech
Keith Magnuson, Denver	D	Paul Domm, Michigan
Jerry Lafond, North Dakota	D	Bruce Riutta, Michigan Tech
Keith Christiansen, Minnesota-Duluth	F	Bob Toothill, Michigan Tech
Jim Wiste, Denver	F	Gary Milroy, Michigan Tech
Tom Mikkola, Michigan State	F	Bob Lindberg, Colorado College

== 1967 NHL Amateur Draft ==
Round	Pick	Player	College	Conference	NHL team
2	17	Al Karlander	Michigan Tech	WCHA	Detroit Red Wings

== See also ==
- 1966–67 NCAA College Division men's ice hockey season
