= 1967 WCHA men's ice hockey tournament =

1967 WCHA Men's ice hockey tournament
- Dates: March 7–11, 1967
- Teams: 8
- Finals site: Dee Stadium; Houghton, Michigan; DU Arena; Denver, Colorado
- Champions: Michigan State† (2nd title); North Dakota‡ (1st title)
- Winning coach: Amo Bessone (2nd title); Bill Selman (1st title)
- WCHA Men's Ice Hockey Tournaments

The 1967 WCHA Men's Ice Hockey Tournament was the 8th conference playoff in league history. The tournament was played between March 7 and March 11, 1967. All games were played at home team campus sites. By being declared as co-champions, both Michigan State and North Dakota were invited to participate in the 1967 NCAA University Division Men's Ice Hockey Tournament.

Though not official designations, Michigan State is considered as the East Regional Champion† and North Dakota as the West Regional Champion‡.

== Format ==
All eight teams in the WCHA were eligible for the tournament. In the first round the schools were matched up based upon regional location, having the schools closest to one another play a single game with the winners advancing to the second round. The two Colorado schools (Colorado College and Denver) met in one match, leaving North Dakota to play their closest geographic rival Minnesota. With the Gophers occupied Minnesota-Duluth's next closest opponent was Michigan Tech, leaving Michigan and Michigan State as the pair in the final First Round game. Because each of these teams had met under the same circumstances the previous year the home venue that wasn't used the first time was utilized for this tournament, resulting in two higher-seeded teams playing on the road. After the first round the two easternmost remaining teams met in the home venues of Michigan Tech (Dee Stadium) while the two westernmost schools met at Denver's home building (DU Arena). In the second round the first and fourth seeds and the second and third seeds were matched with the winners being declared as co-conference tournament champions.

=== Conference standings ===
Note: GP = Games played; W = Wins; L = Losses; T = Ties; PCT = Winning percentage; GF = Goals for; GA = Goals against

1966–67 Western Collegiate Hockey Association standings
	Conference							Overall					
	GP	W	L	T	PCT	GF	GA	GP	W	L	T	GF	GA
North Dakota†*	22	16	6	0	.727	84	70	29	19	10	0	106	92
Denver	16	11	5	0	.688	75	47	30	22	8	0	153	89
Michigan Tech	22	14	7	1	.659	96	61	30	18	11	1	125	84
Michigan	18	11	6	1	.639	82	68	28	19	7	2	150	98
Michigan State*	20	8	11	1	.425	72	81	32	16	15	1	119	121
Minnesota-Duluth	23	8	15	0	.348	90	114	28	12	16	0	124	125
Colorado College	18	6	12	0	.333	55	86	29	15	13	1	122	116
Minnesota	23	5	17	1	.239	88	115	29	9	19	1	134	138
Championship: Michigan State, North Dakota † indicates conference regular season champion * indicates conference tournament champion

== Bracket ==
Eastern Teams advanced to one final while western teams advanced to the other

First Round; March 7–9
1	North Dakota	7
8	Minnesota	2
2	Denver	6
7	Colorado College	3
3	Michigan Tech	6
6	Minnesota-Duluth	4
4	Michigan	2
5	Michigan State	4

Second Round; March 11
1	North Dakota	3
2	Denver	2
3	Michigan Tech	1
5	Michigan State	2*

Note: * denotes overtime period(s)

=== First round ===
==== (1) North Dakota vs. (8) Minnesota ====
March 7	Minnesota	2 – 7	North Dakota	Williams Arena

==== (2) Denver vs. (7) Colorado College ====
March 7	Denver	6 – 3	Colorado College	DU Arena

==== (3) Michigan Tech vs. (6) Minnesota-Duluth ====
March 9	Minnesota-Duluth	4 – 6	Michigan Tech	Duluth Arena Auditorium

==== (4) Michigan vs. (5) Michigan State ====
March 9	Michigan State	4 – 2	Michigan	Demonstration Hall

=== Second round ===
==== (1) North Dakota vs. (2) Denver ====
March 11	Denver	2 – 3	North Dakota	DU Arena

==== (3) Michigan Tech vs. (5) Michigan State ====
March 11	Michigan Tech	1 – 2	OT	Michigan State	Dee Stadium

== Tournament awards ==
None

== See also ==
- Western Collegiate Hockey Association men's champions
