= Boston Arena Christmas Tournament =

Tournament information
- Sport: College ice hockey
- Location: Boston, Massachusetts
- Number of tournaments: 17
- Format: Single-elimination, round-robin
- Venue: Boston Arena
- Teams: 4–9

Final champion
- Boston University

The Boston Arena Christmas Tournament was a mid-season college ice hockey tournament with the first iteration played in late December 1953. It was held 17 times over an 18-year span and was discontinued after the 1970 edition.

== History ==
The Boston Arena, which had served as a home for several college ice hockey programs, began hosting a tournament held between Christmas and New Year's starting in 1953. Boston University, which then played its home games at the Arena, served as the host for the tournament. After a few years, Northeastern, who also played its home games at the Boston Arena, joined in on the tournament and served as co-host for the remainder of its existence.

During the first few years, the tournament format and even the number of teams changed annually. The first iteration was a simple, 4-team, single-elimination tournament. The following year, seven team participated but did not play an equal number of games. Two more teams were added for the third event, while the fourth edition reverted to a more common 8-team tournament format. In years five and six, 6 teams were invited, however, the fifth version had all participants playing three games while the following year each team played two games with a tie-breaker being held between the two top teams on the final day. After 1960, the tournament settled down and became a more common 4-team tournament. After one year with a single-elimination format, it converted into a round-robin series and remained that way for several years. The tournament was last held in December 1970, after which, Boston University moved into the Walter Brown Arena.

Perhaps the most memorable game in the history of the tournament came in 1966 when Boston University met Cornell. Both teams were undefeated at the time and were widely regarded as the top two squads in the nation. The two played to a 3–3 tie after regulation and then went scoreless for 40 minutes of overtime. After the second extra period the head coaches for both teams met and agreed to call the game a draw as their respective teams were worn out and both had already proven to be the equal of the other. The two were named co-champions of the tournament.

== Results ==
Year	Champion	Runner-up	Third place	Fourth place	Fifth place	Sixth place	Seventh place	Eighth place	Ninth place
1953	St. Lawrence	Boston University	Boston College	Middlebury	-	-	-	-	-
1954	McGill	Harvard	Tufts	St. Lawrence	Brown	Boston University	Boston College	-	-
1955	Clarkson	St. Lawrence	Dalhousie	Boston University	Boston College	Brown	Providence	Harvard	Tufts
1956	Harvard	Boston College	Boston University	Brown	Providence	Dartmouth	Northeastern	Army	-
1957	Boston University	Boston College	Providence	Brown	Dartmouth	Northeastern	-	-	-
1958	Michigan State	Boston University	Boston College	Brown	Providence	Northeastern	-	-	-
1959	Toronto	Boston University	Harvard	Providence	Brown	Colby	Northeastern	-	-
1960	Providence	Dalhousie	Boston University	Northeastern	Army	Brown	-	-	-
1961	Michigan State	Queen's	Northeastern	Boston University	-	-	-	-	-
1962	Harvard	Colorado College	Boston University	Northeastern	-	-	-	-	-
1964	Michigan	Boston University	Harvard	Northeastern	-	-	-	-	-
1965	Michigan Tech	Boston University	Michigan	Northeastern	-	-	-	-	-
1966	Boston University / Cornell		Harvard	Northeastern	-	-	-	-	-
1967	Boston University	St. Francis Xavier	Northeastern	Merrimack	-	-	-	-	-
1968	Boston University	Harvard	Clarkson	Northeastern	-	-	-	-	-
1969	Boston University	New Hampshire	Michigan State	Northeastern	-	-	-	-	-
1970	Boston University	Notre Dame	Providence	Northeastern	-	-	-	-	-

Note: The tournament was not held in 1963.

== Game results ==
=== 1953 ===
Semifinals; December 29
Boston University	3
Middlebury	2
Boston College	1
St. Lawrence	4

Championship; December 30
Boston University	2
St. Lawrence	14
Third place
Boston College	5
Middlebury	2

=== 1954 ===
Round Robin

Date	Winning team	Score	Losing team	Score
December 27	McGill	6	Boston College	3
December 27	Brown	3	Boston University	0
December 27	Harvard	3	St. Lawrence	2 (OT)
December 28	Tufts	10	Boston University	5
December 28	St. Lawrence	6	Brown	3
December 28	McGill	2	Harvard	1
December 29	Harvard	8	Boston College	2
December 29	McGill	5	Brown	3

=== 1955 ===
Round Robin

Date	Winning team	Score	Losing team	Score
December 26	Boston College	5	Brown	3
December 26	Boston University	14	Providence	3
December 27	St. Lawrence	6	Boston University	0
December 27	Brown	10	Tufts	2
December 27	Dalhousie	6	Providence	5 (OT)
December 28	St. Lawrence	6	Boston College	2
December 28	Clarkson	11	Harvard	5
December 28	Providence	10	Tufts	7
December 29	Dalhousie	7	Brown	2
December 30	St. Lawrence	3	Harvard	1
December 30	Clarkson	7	Boston College	6
December 31	Clarkson	10	Boston University	5
December 31	Dalhousie	6	Harvard	5

=== 1956 ===
5th place match December 29
Dartmouth	2
Providence	8
Seventh place
Army	2
Northeastern	7

5th – 8th place play-offs December 28
Dartmouth	6
Army	2
Providence	10
Northeastern	2

Quarterfinals; December 27
Boston University	6
Dartmouth	2
Harvard	4
Army	3
Boston College	6
Providence	2
Brown	6
Northeastern	4

Semifinals; December 28
Boston University	2
Harvard	5
Boston College	6
Brown	2

Championship; December 29
Harvard	4
Boston College	2
Third place
Boston University	6
Brown	1

=== 1957 ===
Round Robin

Date	Winning team	Score	Losing team	Score
December 26	Brown	6	Northeastern	4
December 26	Boston College	4	Dartmouth	2
December 26	Boston University	7	Providence	3
December 27	Boston College	4	Brown	3
December 27	Boston University	5	Dartmouth	2
December 27	Providence	10	Northeastern	2
December 28	Boston University	10	Brown	3
December 28	Boston College	5	Providence	2
December 28	Dartmouth	2	Northeastern	1

=== 1958 ===
Round Robin

Date	Winning team	Score	Losing team	Score
December 26	Boston University	8	Brown	3
December 26	Michigan State	7	Northeastern	1
December 27	Boston University	6	Providence	4
December 28	Michigan State	6	Boston College	0
December 29	Boston College	7	Providence	2
December 29	Brown	5	Northeastern	3
December 30	Michigan State	3	Boston University	2

=== 1959 ===
Round Robin

Date	Winning team	Score	Losing team	Score
December 28	Brown	3	Boston University	2
December 28	Toronto	4	Colby	2
December 28	Harvard	8	Northeastern	2
December 29	Boston University	5	Colby	1
December 29	Toronto	3	Brown	2
December 29	Harvard	5	Providence	4 (OT)
December 30	Boston University	9	Northeastern	4
December 30	Providence	2	Brown	1
December 30	Toronto	7	Harvard	2

=== 1960 ===
Round Robin

Date	Winning team	Score	Losing team	Score
December 27	Providence	3	Army	2
December 27	Boston University	10	Brown	0
December 27	Dalhousie	10	Northeastern	2
December 28	Boston University	4	Army	3
December 28	Northeastern	6	Brown	0
December 28	Providence	5	Dalhousie	4
December 29	Dalhousie	6	Boston University	5
December 29	Army	5	Brown	2
December 29	Providence	10	Northeastern	3

=== 1961 ===
Semifinals; December 26
Boston University	3
Queen's	5
Michigan State	13
Northeastern	4

Championship; December 28
Queen's	1
Michigan State	6
Third place
Boston University	6
Northeastern	9

=== 1962 ===
Round Robin

Date	Winning team	Score	Losing team	Score
December 26	Colorado College	5	Boston University	4
December 26	Harvard	11	Northeastern	6
December 27	Harvard	10	Boston University	3
December 27	Colorado College	5	Northeastern	3
December 28	Boston University	7	Northeastern	5
December 28	Harvard	3	Colorado College	2 (OT)

=== 1964 ===
Round Robin

Date	Winning team	Score	Losing team	Score
December 28	Northeastern	4	Boston University	3
December 28	Michigan	4	Harvard	2
December 29	Boston University	8	Harvard	0
December 29	Michigan	7	Northeastern	2
December 30	Michigan	4	Boston University	3
December 30	Harvard	5	Northeastern	1

=== 1965 ===
Round Robin

Date	Winning team	Score	Losing team	Score
December 27	Boston University	7	Michigan	2
December 27	Michigan Tech	8	Northeastern	5
December 28	Boston University	4	Northeastern	1
December 28	Michigan Tech	7	Michigan	6
December 29	Michigan Tech	5	Boston University	2
December 29	Michigan	6	Northeastern	2

=== 1966 ===
Round Robin

Date	Winning team	Score	Losing team	Score
December 28	Boston University	7	Harvard	5
December 28	Cornell	4	Northeastern	2
December 29	Boston University	6	Northeastern	1
December 29	Cornell	4	Harvard	1
December 30	Boston University	3	Cornell	3 (2OT)
December 30	Harvard	5	Northeastern	4 (OT)

=== 1967 ===
Round Robin

Date	Winning team	Score	Losing team	Score
December 28	Boston University	8	Merrimack	1
December 28	St. Francis Xavier	5	Northeastern	2
December 29	Boston University	8	Northeastern	4
December 29	St. Francis Xavier	5	Merrimack	4
December 30	Boston University	7	St. Francis Xavier	2
December 30	Northeastern	6	Merrimack	5 (2OT)

=== 1968 ===
Semifinals; December 27
Boston University	9
Northeastern	1
Harvard	7
Clarkson	2

Championship; December 28
Boston University	2
Harvard	1
Third place
Northeastern	4
Clarkson	6

=== 1969 ===
Semifinals; December 29
Boston University	7
Northeastern	3
New Hampshire	6
Michigan State	5

Championship; December 30
Boston University	7
New Hampshire	3
Third place
Northeastern	5
Michigan State	6

=== 1970 ===
Semifinals; December 28
Boston University	4
Providence	1
Notre Dame	4
Northeastern	1

Championship; December 29
Boston University	7
Notre Dame	3
Third place
Providence	5
Northeastern	1

== Participating teams ==
Team	# of times participated	Titles
Boston University	17	6
Harvard	8	2
Michigan State	3	2
Providence	3	1
St. Lawrence	3	1
Clarkson	2	1
Michigan	2	1
Cornell	1	1
McGill	1	1
Michigan Tech	1	1
Toronto	1	1
Northeastern	14	0
Brown	7	0
Boston College	6	0
Army	2	0
Dalhousie	2	0
Dartmouth	2	0
Tufts	2	0
Colby	1	0
Colorado College	1	0
Merrimack	1	0
Middlebury	1	0
New Hampshire	1	0
Notre Dame	1	0
Queen's	1	0
St. Francis Xavier	1	0
