= 1967 NCAA University Division men's ice hockey tournament =

College ice hockey tournament

- Teams: 4
- Finals site: Onondaga County War Memorial, Syracuse, New York
- Champions: Cornell Big Red (1st title)
- Runner-up: Boston University Terriers (2nd title game)
- Semifinalists: Michigan State Spartans (3rd Frozen Four); North Dakota Fighting Sioux (5th Frozen Four)
- Winning coach: Ned Harkness (2nd title)
- MOP: Skip Stanowski (Cornell)

The 1967 NCAA Men's University Division Ice Hockey Tournament was the culmination of the 1966–67 NCAA University Division men's ice hockey season, the 20th such tournament in NCAA history. It was held between March 16 and 18, 1967, and concluded with Cornell defeating Boston University 4–1. All games were played at the Onondaga County War Memorial in Syracuse, New York.

This was the first championship for an eastern team since 1954 and the first time since 1949 that both finalists were from the east.

== Qualifying teams ==
Four teams qualified for the tournament, two each from the eastern and western regions. The ECAC tournament champion and the two WCHA tournament co-champions received automatic bids into the tournament. An at-large bid was offered to a second eastern team based upon both their ECAC tournament finish as well as their regular season record.

| East | | | | | | | West | | | | | | |
| Seed | School | Conference | Record | Berth type | Appearance | Last bid | Seed | School | Conference | Record | Berth type | Appearance | Last bid |
|---|---|---|---|---|---|---|---|---|---|---|---|---|---|
| 1 | Boston University | ECAC Hockey | 24–4–1 | At-Large | 6th | 1966 | 1 | North Dakota | WCHA | 19–8–0 | Tournament co-champion | 5th | 1965 |
| 2 | Cornell | ECAC Hockey | 25–1–1 | Tournament champion | 1st | Never | 2 | Michigan State | WCHA | 15–14–1 | Tournament co-champion | 3rd | 1966 |

== Format ==
Despite winning the tournament the ECAC champion was not seeded as the top eastern team; this occurred because the at-large team had a better conference regular season record. The WCHA co-champion with the better regular season record was given the top western seed. The second eastern seed was slotted to play the top western seed and vice versa. All games were played at the Onondaga County War Memorial. All matches were Single-game eliminations with the semifinal winners advancing to the national championship game and the losers playing in a consolation game.

== Bracket ==
Semifinals; March 16–17
W1 | North Dakota | 0
E2 | Cornell | 1
E1 | Boston University | 4
W2 | Michigan State | 2

National championship March 18
E2 | Cornell | 4
E1 | Boston University | 1
Third-place game
W1 | North Dakota | 1
W2 | Michigan State | 6

Note: * denotes overtime period(s)

=== Semifinals ===
==== (W1) North Dakota vs. (E2) Cornell ====
| March 16 | North Dakota | 0 – 1 | Cornell | Onondaga County War Memorial | Recap |
| No Scoring | | First period | 17:27 - GW - Skip Stanowski (McGuinn, Tufford) |
| No scoring | | Second period | No scoring |
| No scoring | | Third period | No scoring |
| ( 41 saves / 42 shots ) Mike Curran | | Goalie stats | Ken Dryden ( 30 saves / 30 shots ) |

==== (E1) Boston University vs. (W2) Michigan State ====
| March 17 | Boston University | 4 – 2 | Michigan State | Onondaga County War Memorial |
| (unassisted) Fred Bassi – 04:18 (Sobeski, Gilmour) Jim Quinn – 08:36 | | First period | No Scoring |
| (Quinn, Sobeski) Fred Bassi – GW – 12:53 | | Second period | 10:02 – Bill Faunt (Fallat, Anstey) |
| (Gilmour) Darrell Abbott – 14:34 | | Third period | 10:08 – Tom Mikkola (Hathaway) |

=== Consolation Game ===
==== (W1) North Dakota vs. (W2) Michigan State ====
| March 18 | North Dakota | 1 – 6 | Michigan State | Onondaga County War Memorial |
| (Bamburak) Dave Kartio – 08:00 | | First period | 13:25 – Mike Jacobson (Hathaway, Mikkola); 15:06 – GW – Brian McAndrew (Brawley, Cristofoli) |
| No Scoring | | Second period | 02:08 – Wayne Duffett (McAndrew, Cristofoli); 08:14 – Tom Mikkola (Jacobson, McAndrew); 10:21 – Tom Mikkola (Bois) |
| No Scoring | | Third period | 10:18 – Brian McAndrew (Brawley, Cristofoli) |

=== National Championship ===
==== (E1) Boston University vs. (E2) Cornell ====
| March 18 | Boston University | 1 – 4 | Cornell | Onondaga County War Memorial |

Scoring summary
| Period | Team | Goal | Assist(s) | Time | Score |
|---|---|---|---|---|---|
| 1st | COR | Bob Kinasewich | Death and Stanowski | 1:26 | 1–0 COR |
| 1st | COR | Skip Stanowski - GW PP | Da. Ferguson and Orr | 18:55 | 2–0 COR |
| 2nd | COR | Doug Ferguson - PP | Da. Ferguson | 32:41 | 3–0 COR |
| 2nd | BU | Mike Sobeski | Quinn and Bassi | 32:53 | 3–1 COR |
| 3rd | COR | Robert McGuinn | Coviello and Stanowski | 50:12 | 4–1 COR |
Penalty summary
| Period | Team | Player | Penalty | Time | PIM |
| 1st | COR | Ted Coviello | Tripping | 1:52 | 2:00 |
| 1st | COR | Bruce Pattison | Hooking | 11:08 | 2:00 |
| 1st | BU | Jack Parker | Hooking | 17:40 | 2:00 |
| 2nd | COR | Bob Kinasewich | Leaving feet to play puck | 22:01 | 2:00 |
| 2nd | COR | Harry Orr | Tripping | 23:38 | 2:00 |
| 2nd | BU | Mike Sobeski | Interference | 26:50 | 2:00 |
| 2nd | BU | John Cooke | Charging | 32:12 | 2:00 |
| 2nd | COR | Paul Althouse | Hooking | 34:37 | 2:00 |
| 2nd | COR | Mike Doran | Cross-checking | 35:29 | 2:00 |
| 2nd | BU | Fred Bassi | Tripping | 37:32 | 2:00 |
| 3rd | COR | Harry Orr | Spearing | 43:09 | 2:00 |
| 3rd | BU | Fred Bassi | Cross-checking | 48:10 | 2:00 |
| 3rd | COR | Harry Orr | Interference | 55:27 | 2:00 |
| 3rd | COR | Don Ferguson | High-sticking | 57:02 | 2:00 |
| 3rd | COR | Don Ferguson | Fighting | 57:02 | 5:00 |
| 3rd | COR | Don Ferguson | Game disqualification | 57:02 | 10:00 |
| 3rd | BU | Bill Riley | High-sticking | 57:02 | 2:00 |
| 3rd | BU | Jack Parker | Roughing | 57:02 | 2:00 |

Shots by period
| Team | 1 | 2 | 3 | T |
|---|---|---|---|---|
| Cornell | 14 | 16 | 6 | 36 |
| Boston University | 9 | 16 | 18 | 42 |

Goaltenders
| Team | Name | Saves | Goals against | Time on ice |
|---|---|---|---|---|
| COR | Ken Dryden | 41 | 1 | 60:00 |
| BU | Wayne Ryan | 32 | 4 | 60:00 |

== All-Tournament team ==
=== First Team ===
- G: Ken Dryden (Cornell)
- D: Harry Orr (Cornell)
- D: Skip Stanowski* (Cornell)
- F: Mike Doran (Cornell)
- F: Tom Mikkola (Michigan State)
- F: Jim Quinn (Boston University)

* Most Outstanding Player(s)

=== Second Team ===
- G: Wayne Ryan (Boston University)
- D: Pete McLachlan (Boston University)
- D: Brian Gilmour (Boston University)
- F: Doug Ferguson (Cornell)
- F: Dave Ferguson (Cornell)
- F: Brian McAndrew (Michigan State)
