= Skip Stanowski =

Canadian ice hockey player

- Born: September 10, 1944 (age 82) Winnipeg, Manitoba, Canada
- Height: 6 ft 0 in (183 cm)
- Weight: 175 lb (79 kg; 12 st 7 lb)
- Position: Defenseman
- Shot: Left
- Played for: Cornell
- NHL draft: Undrafted
- Playing career: 1965–1970

Walter "Skip" Stanowski is a retired Canadian ice hockey player. He helped Cornell win their first National Title in 1967, receiving the Tournament MOP and captaining the team the following season.

== Career ==
Stanowski began his career at Cornell in 1964 on the freshman team before joining the varsity squad for the 1965–66 season. Stanowski was part of the defensive corps that cut the team's goals against by nearly a full goal per game from the season before (2.88 to 2.00) and brought the Big Red their best finish with a 22–5 record. In the postseason Cornell won their first playoff game and ended up as the ECAC runner-up. Ordinarily that would have allowed the Big Red to receive the second eastern bid into the NCAA tournament; however, due to an ongoing dispute between the Ivy League and the NCAA over player eligibility Cornell was not allowed to participate and their season was over.

The next year Stanowski led the Big Red defense in points, pushing the team even higher in the ECAC standings. With sophomore Ken Dryden around to clean up any defensive mistakes, Cornell reduced their goals allowed even further, surrendering 46 goals in 29 games (1.59 goals per game) and again set a team record for wins with 27. Because the eligibility issue had been resolved Stanowski was able to continue his offensive pace in the 1967 NCAA Tournament, Cornell's first ever appearance. He scored the only goal in the team's 1–0 semifinal win over North Dakota then recorded three points, including the game-winner, in their 4–1 triumph in the National title game. Stanowski was named the Tournament Most Outstanding Player for contributing on four of his team's five goals, only the second defenseman to win the award.

In his senior season Stanowski served as team captain and led the Big Red to a second ECAC title but the team was unable to get past the Fighting Sioux in the semifinal a second time and finished third in 1968. Stanowski finished with 24 goals and 73 points in his three seasons with the Big Red. After graduating from Cornell Stanowski briefly played for the Muskegon Mohawks before retiring as a player in 1970.

In 2001 Skip Stanowski was inducted into the Cornell University Athletic Hall of Fame.

== Personal life ==
Skip's father Wally played 12 seasons in the NHL, winning four Stanley Cups with Toronto.

== Awards and honors ==
Award	Year
ECAC Hockey All-Tournament Second Team	1967
All-NCAA All-Tournament First Team	1967
All-ECAC First Team	1967–68
AHCA East All-American	1967–68
ECAC Hockey All-Tournament First Team	1968

Awards and achievements
Preceded by Gaye Cooley	NCAA Tournament Most Outstanding Player; 1967	Succeeded by Gerry Powers
