= Ned Harkness =

American ice hockey and lacrosse coach (1921–2008)

Biographical details
- Born: September 19, 1919; Ottawa, Ontario, Canada
- Died: September 19, 2008 (aged 89); Rochester, New York, U.S.

Coaching career (HC unless noted)

Ice hockey
- 1949–1963: RPI
- 1963–1970: Cornell
- 1970–1971: Detroit Red Wings
- 1975–1978: Union

Lacrosse
- 1945–1958: RPI
- 1966–1968: Cornell

Administrative career (AD unless noted)
- 1971–1974: Detroit Red Wings (GM)
- 1979–1982: Adirondack Red Wings (GM)

Head coaching record
- Overall: 384–131–11 (college ice hockey); 147–27–2 (college lacrosse); 12–22–24 (NHL)
- Tournaments: 9–5

Accomplishments and honors

Championships
- 1952 NCAA National Champion (Lacrosse); 1953 Tri-State League Champion; 1954 Tri-State League Champion; 1954 NCAA National Champion; 1957 Tri-State League Champion; 1967 ECAC Tournament Champion; 1967 NCAA National Champion; 1968 ECAC Champion; 1968 ECAC Tournament Champion; 1969 ECAC Champion; 1969 ECAC Tournament Champion; 1970 ECAC Champion; 1970 ECAC Tournament Champion; 1970 NCAA National Champion

Awards
- 1968 Spencer Penrose Award; 1981 Cornell Athletic Hall of Fame; 1982 Rensselaer Athletic Hall of Fame; 1993 Lake Placid Hall of Fame; 1994 US Hockey Hall of Fame; 1998 Hobey Baker Legend of College Hockey Award; 2001 National Lacrosse Hall of Fame; 2007 Rensselaer Hockey Ring of Honor

Records
- 1970 Highest Winning Percentage (1.000)

Nevin Donald Harkness (September 19, 1919 – September 19, 2008) was an NCAA head coach of ice hockey and lacrosse at Rensselaer Polytechnic Institute and Cornell University and of ice hockey at Union College. Harkness was also head coach of the Detroit Red Wings and later was the team's general manager. He was inducted into the Lake Placid Hall of Fame in 1993, the National Lacrosse Hall of Fame in 2001 and into the RPI Hockey Ring of Honor in 2007. He is also a member of the United States Hockey Hall of Fame in Eveleth, Minnesota, having been inducted in 1994.

== Early years ==
Harkness grew up in Ontario, but before coming of age, his family moved to the Glens Falls, New York, region north of Albany (Harkness became a naturalized American citizen in 1949). He graduated from the Worcester Academy in 1939.

== RPI Lacrosse ==
In 1941, Harkness became a volunteer coach for a group of students at Rensselaer Polytechnic Institute in Troy who were interested in forming a lacrosse club. Through that year and the next, the team practiced and scrimmaged with Harkness leading the way, eventually playing games against four varsity programs. World War II led to the disbanding of the team, but when the school formally established a varsity lacrosse program in 1945, Harkness was asked to become its first coach.

Within a year of its establishment, Ned Harkness had Rensselaer ranked among the best lacrosse teams in the country. In 1948, coming off an undefeated season of collegiate play, he took the team to the Olympic Games in London, England, where the team, representing the United States, would tie the British All-Star team before 60,000 at Wembley Stadium while amassing an 8–0–1 record in nine games played in England.

In 1952, while continuing to establish a serious hockey program, he coached the lacrosse team to an undefeated record and the national lacrosse championship, winning the Wingate Memorial Trophy, which predated the NCAA lacrosse title.

Harkness' combined lacrosse coaching record, both at RPI and Cornell, was 147 wins, 27 losses and 2 ties, in 16 seasons for a .841 winning percentages, one of the best performances by any college lacrosse coach. Harkness was inducted into the National Lacrosse Hall of Fame in 2001.

== Reviving RPI Hockey ==
Following World War II, RPI President Livingston Houston began looking for a way to re-establish hockey at the Institute, and Harkness was willing to lend his assistance. After the construction of the Houston Field House was completed in late 1949, the team began play under Harkness in January 1950.

After leading the team to a 4–6–0 record in its first year, Harkness helped form the Tri-State League, which would become the first attempt at league organization of college hockey in the east. Later that year, Harkness devised the RPI Holiday Tournament, which has taken place every year since 1951, making it the oldest in-season tournament in the nation.

Harkness coached both hockey and lacrosse at Rensselaer throughout most of the 1950s and continued coaching hockey into the 1960s.

That same year, Harkness led the hockey team to its first Tri-State title with a 15–3 overall record, though the title was later revoked when the team was found to be using an ineligible player.

The team continued to improve rapidly on the ice under Harkness' guidance. In 1953, the team won its first official Tri-State championship and was invited to the NCAA Tournament for the first time, winning third place. The next season, Harkness guided RPI to an 18–5 overall record, a second straight Tri-State title, and a second straight trip to Colorado Springs for the NCAA Tournament. Though heavy underdogs, Harkness and his team upset traditional powerhouses Michigan and Minnesota to win the 1954 NCAA Championship.

Harkness was the head coach of the men's ice hockey team at Rensselaer beginning with the 1949–1950 season through the 1962–1963 season. He led the team to a record of 176–96–7 and NCAA tournament appearances in 1953, 1954, and 1961, winning the NCAA title in 1954. His 1951–52 team averaged 8.28 goals per game, an NCAA record which stands today. He would leave the lacrosse team in 1958 to focus on RPI hockey after leading the team to a record of 112–26–2 in 14 years, and left RPI hockey in 1963 after three NCAA appearances, two Tri-State titles, one NCAA championship, and a record of 176–96–7 over 14 years.

== Moving to Ithaca ==
In 1963, Harkness moved to Cornell University, where he replaced Paul Patten as the head coach of the hockey team. In his first year at Cornell, Harkness helped the team to a 12–10–1 record in the fledgling ECAC league. His second season saw the team record improve to 19 wins. His stature rose to legendary status with the recruitment of Ken Dryden.

In 1966, Harkness bested the previous year's total by winning 22 games while losing 5 times. The following season, Ken Dryden came to Ithaca to play in net. The 1967 record was 27–1–1. Cornell participated in the NCAA Tournament for the first time in school history, with Harkness' second NCAA championship as the Big Red defeated North Dakota and Boston University for the title.

The team's success continued for the remainder of Harkness' time at Cornell. The next season, Cornell again went to the NCAA Tournament, again with 27 victories, but lost to North Dakota in the semifinals before defeating Boston College for third place. Harkness again won 27 times in the 1968–69 campaign, the only regular season loss coming from Rensselaer. Cornell defeated Michigan Tech in the NCAA Tournament before dropping the championship game to the Denver Pioneers.

Harkness and his Cornell team achieved a perfect record, undefeated and untied, in 1970. Cornell capped the 29–0–0 season with victories over Wisconsin and Clarkson University in the NCAA Tournament, bringing Harkness his third and final NCAA championship, and Cornell's second title in four years.

While coaching ice hockey at Cornell, his overall record was 163–27–2 over seven seasons, and his teams won 2 NCAA titles, one in 1967 and one in 1970.

Amidst his success at Lynah Rink, Harkness returned to coaching lacrosse, coaching the Cornell lacrosse team to the 1966 and 1968 Ivy League titles, and reaching an astounding 35–1 record during his three years at the helm. Following the 1970 regular season, Harkness left Cornell on top to coach in the National Hockey League.

== The NHL ==
Ned Harkness was hired by the Detroit Red Wings to become head coach on May 22, 1970. He replaced Sid Abel, an interim replacement for Bill Gadsby. Harkness was 12–22–4 with the Red Wings before Doug Barkley was hired to complete the season. Harkness was promoted to general manager of the Red Wings in January 1971, where he remained for three seasons.

Despite his success in the college ranks, Harkness was not a successful coach or general manager in the National Hockey League. A veteran and aging Detroit roster had resisted adapting to Harkness's more progressive methods. Things that are commonplace and obvious today, such as no cigar smoking in the locker room between periods and shorter ice shifts caused a mutiny by the veteran players.

Detroit fans still remember this era as "Darkness with Harkness", one of the worst periods in franchise history.

== Union College ==
After his departure from the NHL, Harkness set his sights on college hockey once again. He returned to New York's Capital District, where he had lived in Glens Falls and coached the RPI Engineers.

Union College had fielded a hockey team in the early 20th century but had been unable to bounce back from the loss of the program during World War II. Harkness went to Union and helped create a new program from the ground up. Achilles Center was built, and Harkness was made rink manager and the team's coach. The school began play in NCAA Division III and with Harkness behind the bench, the team was instantly successful. The Skating Dutchmen finished with a 20–4–1 record in the 1975–76 season, their first since the 1940s, with a roster full of freshmen. Harkness followed up this initial success with a 22–3–1 season, and the young program was well on its way to becoming a college hockey powerhouse.

The 1977–78 season started off well for the Skating Dutchmen, as Harkness guided the team to a 4–1–1 record in their first 6 games. However, in late December, Harkness abruptly quit the team. Four more of his players had been declared ineligible to play due to academic suspensions. News began to leak that he had been having disputes with Union administration for quite some time. It was alleged that Harkness had violated NESCAC recruiting rules (and then lied to Union College President Thomas Bonner about it), but there was widespread suspicion on campus that admission standards for hockey players had been compromised. Many of the Union players had come in as freshmen well into their twenties, having played in Canadian Senior A teams (much like Harkness's Cornell protégé Dick Bertrand, a Toronto cop who joined Harkness's squad in his late twenties, was a captain of the undefeated team, and then succeeded Harkness as Cornell coach, continuing in that capacity for 11 seasons); others were NHL draftees drawn by the chance to play for the legendary Harkness and his plan to jump the team to Division I.

Upon hearing of their coach's decision to leave, the entire varsity roster of the Skating Dutchmen refused to play the remainder of the season in a show of solidarity with their coach. With a team made up of Junior Varsity and intramural players coached by an inexperienced coach, the Skating Dutchmen would lose their next game 19–1 and go on to lose every game remaining on their schedule.

Union goalie Steve Baker went on to win 9 of his first 10 games in the net for the NHL's New York Rangers - just a year and a half after leaving Union. Jim Baxter, Kip Churchill, and Dean Willers were all drafted by the Detroit Red Wings in 1977.

== Later years ==
In the spring of 1978, Harkness was a finalist for the North Dakota head coach position that was ultimately given to John "Gino" Gasparini. Harkness later served as director of the Glens Falls Civic Center and president of the New York Olympic Regional Development Authority (ORDA), which ran the facilities in Lake Placid, New York, which hosted the 1980 Olympic Winter Games. He was responsible for the construction of the US Olympic Training Center from 1989–1990. In 1991, Harkness was asked to take over operations of the Capital District Islanders, an American Hockey League team playing in Troy at the Houston Field House, but Harkness desired to remain in his current position at ORDA and instead became a part owner of the hockey team with control of its operations. Harkness retired from ORDA in August 1993. He died on September 19, 2008, on his 89th birthday.

== Head coaching record ==
=== College ice hockey ===
Record table
Season	Team	Overall	Conference	Standing	Postseason
Rensselaer Engineers Independent (1964–1969)
1949–50	Rensselaer	4-6-0			
Rensselaer:		4-6-0			
Rensselaer Engineers (Tri-State League) (1950–1961)
1950–51	Rensselaer	5-10-0	1-4-0	t-5th	
1951–52	Rensselaer	15-3-0	4-1-0	2nd	
1952–53	Rensselaer	15-4-1	4-0-1	1st	NCAA Consolation Game (Win)
1953–54	Rensselaer	18-5-0	5-1-0	1st	NCAA National Champion
1954–55	Rensselaer	9-11-2	1-5-0	t-3rd	
1955–56	Rensselaer	12-6-0	2-4-0	3rd	
1956–57	Rensselaer	14-6-1	5-1-0	1st	
1957–58	Rensselaer	14-6-1	2-3-0	2nd	
1958–59	Rensselaer	13-8-0	2-3-0	t-2nd	
1959–60	Rensselaer	15-7-0	2-2-0	2nd	
1960–61	Rensselaer	16-5-1	2-2-0	2nd	NCAA Consolation Game (Loss)
Rensselaer:		146-71-6	30-26-1		
Rensselaer Engineers (ECAC Hockey) (1961–1963)
1961–62	Rensselaer	16-7-0	12-4-0	7th	ECAC Quarterfinals
1962–63	Rensselaer	10-12-1	6-7-1	16th	
Rensselaer:		26-19-1	18-11-1		
Cornell Big Red (ECAC Hockey) (1963–1970)
1963–64	Cornell	12-10-1	9-10-1	16th	
1964–65	Cornell	19-7-0	13-5-0	5th	ECAC Quarterfinals
1965–66	Cornell	22-5-0	16-2-0	3rd	ECAC Runner-Up
1966–67	Cornell	27-1-1	18-1-1	2nd	NCAA National Champion
1967–68	Cornell	27-2-0	19-1-0	1st	NCAA Consolation Game (Win)
1968–69	Cornell	27-2-0	19-1-0	1st	NCAA Runner-Up
1969–70	Cornell	29-0-0	21-0-0	1st	NCAA National Champion
Cornell:		163-27-2	115-20-2		
Union Skating Dutchmen (ECAC 2) (1975–1977)
1975–76	Union	19-4-0	13-1-0	1st	ECAC 2 Quarterfinals
1976–77	Union	22-3-1	11-1-0	1st	ECAC 2 Runner-Up
1977–78†	Union	4-1-1	1-0-0	—	
Union:		45-8-2	25-2-0		
Total:		384-131-11			
National champion Postseason invitational champion Conference regular season champion Conference regular season and conference tournament champion Division regular season champion Division regular season and conference tournament champion Conference tournament champion

† Resigned midseason

=== NHL ===
Team	Year	Regular season						Post season
Team	Year	G	W	L	T	Pts	Finish	Result
Detroit Red Wings	1970–71	38	12	22	4	(28)	7th in East	Missed playoffs

== See also ==
- List of members of the United States Hockey Hall of Fame
- Sports in New York's Capital District

Sporting positions
Preceded by Sid Abel	General manager of the Detroit Red Wings; 1971–1974	Succeeded by Alex Delvecchio
Preceded by Sid Abel	Head coach of the Detroit Red Wings; 1970–1971	Succeeded by Doug Barkley
Awards and achievements
Preceded by Edward Jeremiah	Spencer Penrose Award; 1967–68	Succeeded by Charlie Holt
Preceded by Lou Lamoriello	Hobey Baker Legends of College Hockey Award; 1998	Succeeded by John MacInnes/Glen Sonmor
