= Garry Kearns =

Canadian ice hockey player and coach

Biographical details
- Born: 1935 (age 90–91); Peterborough, Ontario, Canada
- Education: Rensselaer Polytechnic Institute

Playing career
- 1955–1958: Rensselaer
- Position: Forward

Coaching career (HC unless noted)
- 1964–1969: Rensselaer

Head coaching record
- Overall: 44–63–4 (.414)

Garry Kearns (born 1935) is a Canadian retired ice hockey head coach and player who was in charge of the program at Rensselaer for five seasons.

== Career ==
Kearns joined the Rensselaer program a year after it won its first national title in 1954. After sitting out his freshman year (a standard practice at the time), Kearns joined the varsity squad for the 1955–56 season and led the engineers in goals (26), assists (32) and points (58), finishing in a tie for second in NCAA scoring. despite his superlative campaign the Engineers finished third out of four teams in the Tri-State League and were left out of the NCAA tournament. The following year Kearns scoring prowess declined but the Engineers managed to win their conference title. Unfortunately they were once again passed over as second-place Clarkson had a superior record (18-2 compared to RPI's 14–6–1). For his senior season Kearns was named as team captain and responded with a resurgent 56 points in 21 games. Despite this the Engineers were left out of the tournament yet again after finishing second to the powerhouse Golden Knights in their conference.

After graduating Kearns pursued a short professional career with Milwaukee of the United States Central Hockey League then turned to coaching high school hockey. In 1964 Kearns returned to Troy, New York to become the head coach for his alma mater. Kearns became the fourth head coach in the span of three years and was entering as the program was in its nadir. After three years with virtually no recruits and no athletic scholarships available the ice hockey program was in jeopardy of becoming an afterthought. The team struggled to a 10-10-2 record in his first season but once the last recruited senior class graduated the Engineers slipped to dead-last in the ECAC the next year, finishing 3-19 and being outscored 42 to 161. Kearns' team again finished last in 1966–67 season but almost tripled their win total (8) when his first batch of recruits began hitting the ice. By his fourth year with the program Kearns had gotten the Engineers back to .500 with an 11–11 record and followed that up with a 12-8-1 mark. In 1969 Rensselaer made their first appearance in the ECAC tournament since 1964 and provided the first of only two losses to the dominant Cornell team headed by Kearns' former coach Ned Harkness.

With program no longer in dire straits, Kearns left to start a career as an architect. He was inducted into the Peterborough & District Sports Hall of Fame in 2010 and the RPI hockey ring of honor the following year.

== College head coaching record ==
Record table
Season	Team	Overall	Conference	Standing	Postseason
Rensselaer Engineers (ECAC Hockey) (1964–1969)
1964–65	Rensselaer	10–10–2	5–8–2	10th	
1965–66	Rensselaer	3–19–0	0–13–0	15th	
1966–67	Rensselaer	8–15–1	1–14–0	t–15th	
1967–68	Rensselaer	11–11–0	8–9–0	11th	
1968–69	Rensselaer	12–8–1	8–5–1	7th	ECAC Quarterfinals
Rensselaer:		44–63–4	22–49–3		
Total:		44–63–4			
National champion Postseason invitational champion Conference regular season champion Conference regular season and conference tournament champion Division regular season champion Division regular season and conference tournament champion Conference tournament champion

== Awards and honors ==
Award	Year
AHCA First Team All-American	1955–56
