= David Merhar =

American ice hockey player (born 1946)

- Born: October 23, 1946 (age 79) Ely, Minnesota, USA
- Height: 5 ft 8 in (173 cm)
- Weight: 175 lb (79 kg; 12 st 7 lb)
- Position: Wing
- Played for: Army
- NHL draft: Undrafted
- Playing career: 1966–1969
- Military career
- Allegiance: United States
- Branch: United States Army
- Rank: Lieutenant colonel
- Conflicts: Vietnam War
- Awards: Bronze Star Medal

David Michael "Otto" Merhar (born October 23, 1946) is an American former ice hockey winger who was the NCAA Scoring Champion in 1968–69. He is also a retired United States Army Lieutenant colonel.

== Career ==
Merhar hailed from Ely, Minnesota and, as did many from his home state, he grew up playing hockey. Merhar decided to pursue a career in the military after high school and was able to use his athletic background to assist in attending West Point. He played three seasons on the varsity team for Jack Riley, leading the team in scoring each of those seasons. In his first two campaigns both Merhar and the team played well, but it was during his senior season that everything changed. Now the team captain, Merhar went on a scoring rampage from the first game. He scored in all 28 games Army played that year and was held to a single point in just four of those contests. Merhar ended the season with 9 hat-tricks, a program record, along with four 6-point games and three 7-point efforts. He became just the second player in NCAA history to crack the 100-point barrier, falling one shy of Phil Latreille's 108 points in 1961. Despite the gaudy numbers, Merhar was not named an All-American for the year. The reason for this was primarily due to the level of competition that Army faced during the season. While the Cadets were a member of ECAC Hockey the team played less than half of their games against conference opponents. 17 of the team's 28 games were against College Division or club teams. In the eleven ECAC games Merhar was still a potent scorer but his numbers were significantly lower than they were over the entire season (16 goals, 12 assists). His pace of scoring against top competition (2.54) was more than two points lower than it was against lesser competitors (4.65), though it would still have put him near the top of the scoring list for the season (Brian Cornell finished the season averaging 2.55 points per game). Regardless of how he was viewed by the All-American selectors, Merhar helped Army win 20 games for only the second time in program history.

After graduating with a B.S. degree in 1969, Merhar was commissioned as an officer and rose through the ranks of the Army. Deployed to Vietnam from 1971 to 1972, he received a Bronze Star Medal for his tour of duty. Merhar subsequently earned an M.S. degree in industrial engineering and operations research from Purdue University in 1974. He eventually became a lieutenant colonel and worked as an assistant to Alexander Haig. After retiring from active duty Merhar was inducted into the Army Athletic Hall of Fame in 2006. He later had his jersey retired along with two other hockey players.

== Career statistics ==
=== Regular season and playoffs ===
			Regular Season					Playoffs
Season	Team	League	GP	G	A	Pts	PIM	GP	G	A	Pts	PIM
1966–67	Army	ECAC Hockey	—	27	36	63	—	—	—	—	—	—
1967–68	Army	ECAC Hockey	—	28	31	59	—	—	—	—	—	—
1968–69	Army	ECAC Hockey	28	57	50	107	—	—	—	—	—	—
NCAA Totals			—	112	117	229	—	—	—	—	—	—

Awards and achievements
Preceded by Delbert Dehate	NCAA Ice Hockey Scoring Champion; 1968–69	Succeeded by Tim Sheehy
