= Jim Keough =

Canadian ice hockey player

- Born: May 27, 1946 (age 80) Toronto, Ontario, Canada
- Height: 5 ft 7 in (170 cm)
- Weight: 171 lb (78 kg; 12 st 3 lb)
- Position: Goaltender
- Played for: Michigan; Fort Wayne Komets
- NHL draft: Undrafted
- Playing career: 1966–1971

James Keough is a Canadian retired ice hockey goaltender who was an All-American for Michigan.

== Career ==
After finishing his junior carrier with the St. Catharines Black Hawks, Keough was recruited to Michigan in 1965. After a year with the freshman team, Keough split time in net with the previous year's starter Harold Hermann. Keough, however, distinguished himself by allowing one fewer goal per game (3.00 versus 4.00) and swiftly took over the starting role in the Michigan cage. The Wolverines finished 4th in the WCHA but lost in the first round of the conference tournament to rival Michigan State.

The following year, with Keough starting 25 of 27 games, Michigan again finished 4th in the WCHA. Keough was named as an All-American, being seen as the major reason for the Wolverines being competitive in their conference, but he was not selected for either All-WCHA Team. Michigan was again defeated in the first round of the WCHA tournament but that didn't prevent Keough from again leading the team to a 4th place finish as a senior. In his third attempt, Keough finally won a postseason game, helping Michigan reach the second round, before being shelled 4–7 by WCHA champion Michigan Tech. Because Keough's first season was the same year that Michigan began consistently recording most goaltending stats, be set official school records in most categories. Hone of those marks currently stand.

After graduating, Keough played two years of professional hockey for the Fort Wayne Komets before retiring as a player. He returned to his alma mater in 1972 and served as an assistant coach for two seasons. Keough was elected to the Michigan Dekers Club Hall of Fame in 1978.

== Personal life ==
Keough's son, Tim, was a goaltender for Michigan from 1988 through 1991.

== Statistics ==
=== Regular season and playoffs ===
			Regular season									Playoffs
Season	Team	League	GP	W	L	T	MIN	GA	SO	GAA	SV%	GP	W	L	MIN	GA	SO	GAA	SV%
1966–67	Michigan	WCHA	15	—	—	—	900	45	2	3.00	.907	—	—	—	—	—	—	—	—
1967–68	Michigan	WCHA	25	—	—	—	1500	77	3	3.08	.908	—	—	—	—	—	—	—	—
1968–69	Michigan	WCHA	28	—	—	—	1680	100	2	3.57	.891	—	—	—	—	—	—	—	—
1969–70	Fort Wayne Komets	IHL	34	—	—	—	—	—	—	—	—	—	—	—	—	—	—	—	—
1970–71	Fort Wayne Komets	IHL	43	—	—	—	2461	150	2	3.66	—	1	—	—	—	—	—	—	—
NCAA totals			68	—	—	—	4080	222	7	3.26	.901	—	—	—	—	—	—	—	—

== Awards and honors ==
Award	Year
AHCA West All-American	1967–68
