= Rick Duffett =

Canadian ice hockey player and coach (born 1946)

Biographical details
- Born: June 8, 1946 (age 80); Kirkland Lake, Ontario, Canada
- Education: Michigan State

Playing career
- 1967–1971: Michigan State
- Position: Goaltender

Coaching career (HC unless noted)
- 1972–1973: Sault Area High
- 1975–1982: Ferris State

Head coaching record
- Overall: 119-83-7 (.586)

Rick Duffett (born July 8, 1946) is a Canadian retired ice hockey player and coach. Duffett was an administrator and coach with Ferris State University for more than 30 years before retiring in 2008.

== Career ==
Rick Duffett began attending Michigan State University in the fall of 1966 joining the ice hockey program on the heels of their first national title. After sitting out his freshman season per NCAA regulations Duffett hit the ice with the Spartans for the 1967–68 season. In his three undergraduate seasons the team finished with losing records but after graduating in 1970 Duffett remained in East Lansing to finish his master's, appearing in 6 more games over the course of the season.

After an abortive attempt at a professional career Duffett turned to coaching, leading Sault Area High for a time before finding his way behind the bench of the newly created NAIA program at Ferris State. Duffett was able to shepherd the Bulldogs to early success in the NAIA, finishing well above .500 in his first three seasons before his first losing campaign as Ferris State was moving to become an NCAA Division I program. Beginning with the 1979–80 season the Bulldogs were a member of the CCHA and reached the conference tournament final in their first season. After a second 20-win season at the NCAA level Duffett's team was joined in the CCHA by 4 former WCHA teams (finishing behind all four in 1981–82) but Duffett had already made plans to leave the team after the season's conclusion.

With his coaching career over Duffett returned to Michigan State to earn a PhD but couldn't stay away from Big Rapids for long, joining Ferris State's administration and working his way up to a vice presidential role before announcing his retirement in 2008.

== Head coaching record ==
=== College ===
Record table
Season	Team	Overall	Conference	Standing	Postseason
Ferris State Bulldogs (NAIA) (1975–1979)
1975–76	Ferris State	15-6-0			
1976–77	Ferris State	17-4-1			
1977–78	Ferris State	16-6-0			
1978–79	Ferris State	10-24-0			
Ferris State:		58-40-1			
Ferris State Bulldogs (CCHA) (1979–1982)
1979–80	Ferris State	26-11-1	11-9-0	3rd	CCHA Runner-Up
1980–81	Ferris State	20-14-2	13-9-0	3rd	CCHA Semifinals
1981–82	Ferris State	15-18-3	13-15-2	6th	CCHA Quarterfinals
Ferris State:		61-43-6	37-33-2		
Total:		119-83-7			
National champion Postseason invitational champion Conference regular season champion Conference regular season and conference tournament champion Division regular season champion Division regular season and conference tournament champion Conference tournament champion

== Awards and honors ==
Award	Year
AHCA West All-American	1968–69
