= Delbert Dehate =

American ice hockey player

- Born: January 13, 1947 (age 79) Stambaugh, Michigan, U.S.
- Height: 5 ft 11 in (180 cm)
- Weight: 175 lb (79 kg; 12 st 7 lb)
- Position: Center
- Played for: Wisconsin; Toledo Hornets
- NHL draft: Undrafted
- Playing career: 1966–1971

Delbert "Bert" Dehate (born January 13, 1947) is an American retired ice hockey Center who was the NCAA Scoring Champion in 1967–68.

== Career ==
Dehate played parts of four seasons with Wisconsin as the program transitioned into the WCHA. He began attending Wisconsin in the fall of 1966, being in Bob Johnson's first recruiting class. While freshman normally sat out the season, Dehate played in the second semester, recording 29 points in just 10 games. As a sophomore, Dehate continued to pile up points, this time doing so for an entire season. His 77 points led the nation and he helped the Badgers produce a 20+ win season for the first time. However, because Wisconsin's schedule had the team playing many Club or College Division programs, Dehate's scoring was not sufficient to earn him a selection as an All-American.

In Dehate's junior season, Wisconsin's schedule shifted so that it played a majority of University Division teams, most of whom played in the WCHA. This had a secondary effect of reducing Dehate's scoring but he still finished 5th in the nation with 61. Because he had played one semester as a freshman, Dehate could only play in the fall semester as a senior. he scored 21 points in 20 games but was then forced to watch the Badgers complete their inaugural year in the WCHA. Dehate finished the season with the Green Bay Bobcats and then played a year of professional hockey before retiring. Dehate still holds several Wisconsin records as of 2020, including most goals per game (1.14), points per game in a season (1968; 2.48), goals per game in a season (1968; 1.52), most points in a game (8, tied), most goals in a game (5, tied) and has more hat-tricks (11) and 4-goal games (3) than any Badger in the history of the program.

He was inducted into the Wisconsin Athletic Hall of Fame in 2007.

== Career statistics ==
=== Regular season and playoffs ===
| | | | Regular Season | | | | | Playoffs |
| Season | Team | League | GP | G | A | Pts | PIM | GP | G | A | Pts | PIM |
|---|---|---|---|---|---|---|---|---|---|---|---|---|
| 1966–67 | Wisconsin | NCAA | 10 | 14 | 15 | 29 | 2 | — | — | — | — | — |
| 1967–68 | Wisconsin | NCAA | 31 | 47 | 30 | 77 | 23 | — | — | — | — | — |
| 1968–69 | Wisconsin | NCAA | 34 | 36 | 25 | 61 | 50 | — | — | — | — | — |
| 1969–70 | Wisconsin | WCHA | 20 | 11 | 10 | 21 | 18 | — | — | — | — | — |
| 1969–70 | Green Bay Bobcats | USHL | — | — | — | — | — | — | — | — | — | — |
| 1970–71 | Toledo Hornets | IHL | 10 | 3 | 3 | 6 | 2 | — | — | — | — | — |
| 1970–71 | Greensboro Generals | EHL | 36 | 17 | 25 | 42 | 46 | — | — | — | — | — |
| NCAA Totals | | | 95 | 108 | 80 | 188 | 93 | — | — | — | — | — |

Awards and achievements
| Preceded by Jerry York / Herb Wakabayashi | NCAA Ice Hockey Scoring Champion; 1967–68 | Succeeded by David Merhar |
