= Al Karlander =

Canadian ice hockey player (born 1946)

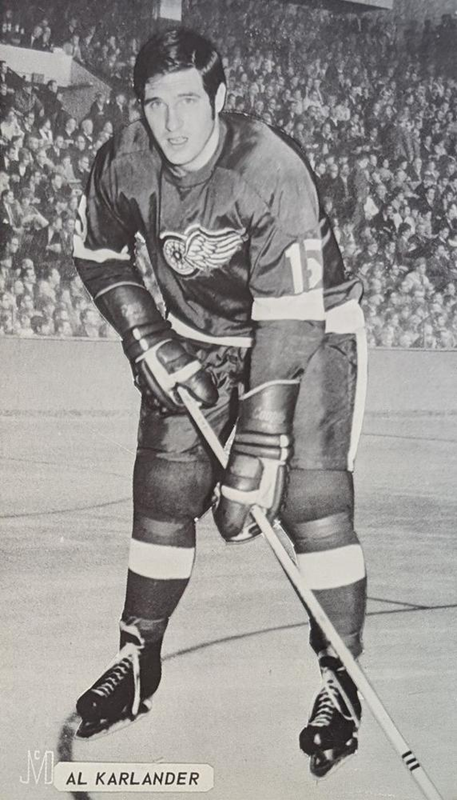
- Karlander in 1970s postcard for Detroit Red Wings
- Born: November 5, 1946 (age 79) Lac la Hache, British Columbia, Canada
- Height: 5 ft 8 in (173 cm)
- Weight: 170 lb (77 kg; 12 st 2 lb)
- Position: Centre
- Shot: Left
- Played for: Detroit Red Wings; New England Whalers; Indianapolis Racers
- NHL draft: 17th overall, 1967; Detroit Red Wings
- Playing career: 1969–1977

Allan David Karlander (born November 5, 1946) is a Canadian retired professional ice hockey player who played 212 games in the National Hockey League between 1969 and 1973 and 269 games in the World Hockey Association between 1973 and 1977. He was the first collegiate player selected in the NHL Draft. He played for the Detroit Red Wings, New England Whalers, and Indianapolis Racers. He was the coach of the Cincinnati Stingers of the Central Hockey League in 1979, but the team folded in December.

== Career statistics ==
=== Regular season and playoffs ===
			Regular season					Playoffs
Season	Team	League	GP	G	A	Pts	PIM	GP	G	A	Pts	PIM
1964–65	Notre Dame Hounds	CA-HS	—	—	—	—	—	—	—	—	—	—
1965–66	Michigan Tech	WCHA	—	—	—	—	—	—	—	—	—	—
1966–67	Michigan Tech	WCHA	29	5	12	17	10	—	—	—	—	—
1967–68	Michigan Tech	WCHA	32	22	13	35	24	—	—	—	—	—
1968–69	Michigan Tech	WCHA	32	31	13	44	24	—	—	—	—	—
1969–70	Detroit Red Wings	NHL	41	5	10	15	6	4	0	1	1	0
1969–70	Fort Worth Wings	CHL	24	15	14	29	12	—	—	—	—	—
1970–71	Detroit Red Wings	NHL	23	1	4	5	10	—	—	—	—	—
1970–71	Fort Worth Wings	CHL	48	30	28	58	40	4	2	1	3	2
1971–72	Detroit Red Wings	NHL	71	15	20	35	29	—	—	—	—	—
1972–73	Detroit Red Wings	NHL	77	15	22	37	25	—	—	—	—	—
1973–74	New England Whalers	WHA	77	20	41	61	46	7	1	3	4	2
1974–75	New England Whalers	WHA	48	7	14	21	2	5	0	3	3	0
1974–75	Cape Codders	NAHL	3	1	2	3	0	—	—	—	—	—
1975–76	Indianapolis Racers	WHA	79	16	28	44	36	3	0	0	0	4
1976–77	Indianapolis Racers	WHA	65	17	28	45	23	6	2	1	3	0
WHA totals			269	60	111	171	107	21	3	7	10	6
NHL totals			212	36	56	92	70	4	0	1	1	0

== Awards and honors ==
Award	Year
All-WCHA Second Team	1967–68
All-WCHA First Team	1968–69
AHCA West All-American	1968–69
NCAA All-Tournament Second Team	1969
