= Gary Gambucci =

American ice hockey player

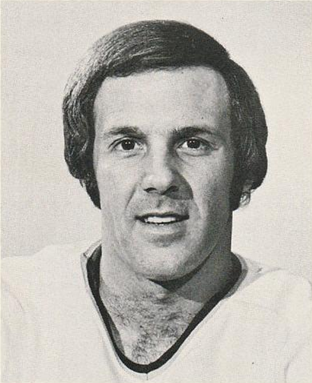
- Born: September 22, 1946 (age 80) Hibbing, Minnesota, USA
- Height: 5 ft 9 in (175 cm)
- Weight: 175 lb (79 kg; 12 st 7 lb)
- Position: Center
- Shot: Left
- Played for: Minnesota North Stars; Minnesota Fighting Saints
- National team: United States
- NHL draft: Undrafted
- Playing career: 1969–1976

Gary Allan "Gubbio" Gambucci (born September 22, 1946 in Hibbing, Minnesota) is an American retired ice hockey forward who played in 51 games in the National Hockey League with the Minnesota North Stars and 112 games for the Minnesota Fighting Saints of the World Hockey Association between 1971 and 1976. Internationally Gambucci played for the American national team at four World Championships.

== Playing career ==
Before turning professional, Gambucci excelled as a scorer for the United States national team at the 1969, 1970 and 1971 1971 World Championships as well as the University of Minnesota hockey team. Gambucci was signed as a free agent by the Montreal Canadiens in the spring of 1971 after scoring seven goals in ten games for Team USA at the 1971 world championships in Bern (he was also elected to the tournament all star team at the world championship "Pool B" qualifying tournament in 1970). The Canadiens immediately traded him and Bob Paradise to the North Stars for cash. However, Gambucci failed to become a regular in Minnesota and left the NHL for the Minnesota Fighting Saints of the rival World Hockey Association following the 1973–74 season. Gambucci retired from professional hockey in 1976 after playing 112 WHA regular season games for the Fighting Saints as well as representing the United States at the 1976 World Championships in Katowice, Poland.

== Career statistics ==
=== Regular season and playoffs ===
			Regular season					Playoffs
Season	Team	League	GP	G	A	Pts	PIM	GP	G	A	Pts	PIM
1965–66	University of Minnesota	WCHA	28	23	17	40	18	—	—	—	—	—
1966–67	University of Minnesota	WCHA	29	17	10	27	23	—	—	—	—	—
1967–68	University of Minnesota	WCHA	31	12	29	41	31	—	—	—	—	—
1968–69	Rochester Mustangs	USHL	—	—	—	—	—	—	—	—	—	—
1968–69	American National Team	Intl	—	—	—	—	—	—	—	—	—	—
1969–70	Muskegon Mohawks	IHL	4	2	1	3	5	—	—	—	—	—
1969–70	Rochester Mustangs	USHL	—	—	—	—	—	—	—	—	—	—
1969–70	American National Team	Intl	6	3	1	4	4	—	—	—	—	—
1970–71	American National Team	Intl	50	51	47	98	30	—	—	—	—	—
1971–72	Minnesota North Stars	NHL	9	1	0	1	0	—	—	—	—	—
1971–72	Cleveland Barons	AHL	56	10	11	21	37	6	0	0	0	10
1972–73	Cleveland/Jacksonville Barons	AHL	75	26	50	76	47	—	—	—	—	—
1973–74	Minnesota North Stars	NHL	42	1	7	8	9	—	—	—	—	—
1973–74	New Haven Nighthawks	AHL	2	1	2	3	2	—	—	—	—	—
1973–74	Portland Buckaroos	WHL	21	11	15	26	20	—	—	—	—	—
1974–75	Minnesota Fighting Saints	WHA	67	19	18	37	19	12	4	0	4	6
1974–75	Johnstown Jets	NAHL	7	1	7	8	2	—	—	—	—	—
1975–76	Minnesota Fighting Saints	WHA	45	10	6	16	14	—	—	—	—	—
WHA totals			112	29	24	53	33	12	4	0	4	6
NHL totals			51	2	7	9	9	—	—	—	—	—

=== International ===
Year	Team	Event	GP	G	A	Pts	PIM
1969	United States	WC	10	1	1	2	6
1970	United States	WC-B	7	11	7	18	4
1971	United States	WC	10	7	3	10	4
1976	United States	WC	10	1	4	5	17
Senior totals			37	20	15	35	31

== Awards and honors ==
Award	Year
All-WCHA Second Team	1965–66
All-WCHA First Team	1967–68
AHCA West All-American	1967–68
United States Hockey Hall of Fame	2006

Awards and achievements
Preceded by Gary Milroy	WCHA Sophomore of the Year; 1965–66	Succeeded by Keith Magnuson/Bob Munro
