= Mike Hyndman =

Canadian ice hockey player

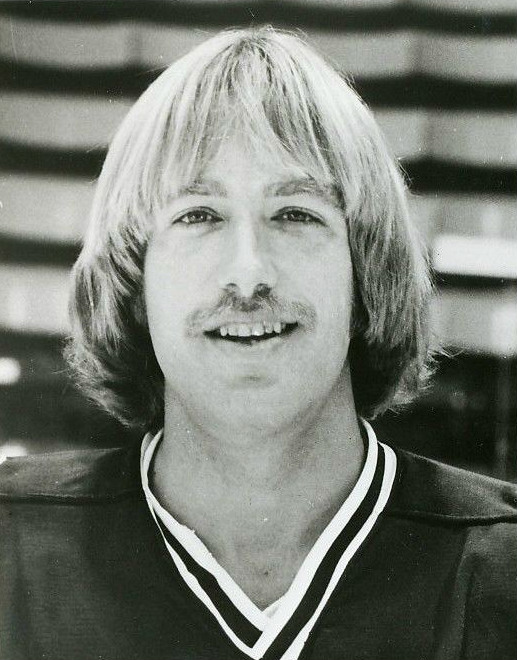
- Born: December 8, 1945 (age 80) Quebec City, Quebec, Canada
- Height: 6 ft 1 in (185 cm)
- Weight: 205 lb (93 kg; 14 st 9 lb)
- Position: Right wing
- Played for: New England Whalers; Los Angeles Sharks
- Playing career: 1970–1981

Michael Anthony Hyndman (born December 8, 1945, in Quebec City, Quebec) is a Canadian former ice hockey right winger who played in the World Hockey Association for the New England Whalers and the Los Angeles Sharks.

Hyndman spent two seasons in the Ontario Hockey Association with the Montreal Junior Canadiens before spending three seasons with Boston University. He turned pro in 1970 in the American Hockey League for the Montreal Voyageurs and then played for the Boston Braves in the same league in 1971. He split the 1972–73 season in the World Hockey Association for the New England Whalers and the Los Angeles Sharks, playing 59 games for the Whalers and 19 games for the Sharks. Spells in the Southern Hockey League for the Greensboro Generals and in the Western Hockey League for the Phoenix Roadrunners was followed with eight more games for the Los Angeles Shark during the 1973–74 season. After one season in the North American Hockey League for the Cape Codders, Hyndman finished his career in Europe with spells in Finland and Austria.

== Career statistics ==
=== Regular season and playoffs ===
			Regular season					Playoffs
Season	Team	League	GP	G	A	Pts	PIM	GP	G	A	Pts	PIM
1963–64	Montreal Junior Canadiens	OHA	55	9	17	26	0	—	—	—	—	—
1964–65	Verdun Maple Leafs	MMJHL	19	14	27	41	24	—	—	—	—	—
1964–65	Montreal Junior Canadiens	OHA	23	4	8	12	0	—	—	—	—	—
1965–66	Verdun Maple Leafs	MMJHL	38	31	35	66	85	—	—	—	—	—
1967–68	Boston University	ECAC	32	23	44	67	51	—	—	—	—	—
1968–69	Boston University	ECAC	29	18	34	52	20	—	—	—	—	—
1969–70	Boston University	ECAC	27	11	41	52	34	—	—	—	—	—
1970–71	Montreal Voyageurs	AHL	55	11	15	26	67	—	—	—	—	—
1971–72	Boston Braves	AHL	75	20	14	34	38	9	2	2	4	22
1972–73	New England Whalers	WHA	59	4	14	18	21	—	—	—	—	—
1972–73	Los Angeles Sharks	WHA	19	8	7	15	11	6	0	3	3	17
1973–74	Los Angeles Sharks	WHA	8	0	1	1	0	—	—	—	—	—
1973–74	Greensboro Generals	SHL	12	4	6	10	9	—	—	—	—	—
1973–74	Phoenix Roadrunners	WHL	30	11	7	18	30	9	1	4	5	0
1974–75	Cape Codders	NAHL	61	15	28	43	26	—	—	—	—	—
1976–77	Kiekkoreipas Lahti	SM–liiga	35	12	7	19	111	—	—	—	—	—
1979–80	Vienna	Austria	40	44	50	94	41	—	—	—	—	—
1980–81	Austria	Intl	34	26	43	69	33	—	—	—	—	—
WHA totals			86	12	22	34	32	6	0	3	3	17

== Awards and honors ==
Award	Year
All-ECAC Hockey Second Team	1967–68
All-ECAC Hockey Second Team	1968–69
All-ECAC Hockey First Team	1969–70
AHCA East All-American	1969–70
ECAC Hockey All-Tournament Second Team	1970

Awards and achievements
Preceded by Herb Wakabayashi	ECAC Hockey Rookie of the Year; 1967–68	Succeeded by Joe Cavanagh
