= Tim Sheehy (ice hockey) =

Canadian born American ice hockey player (born 1948)

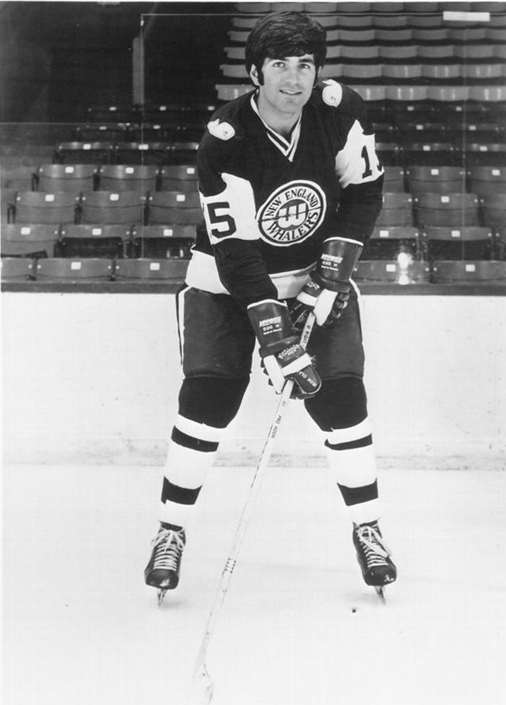
- Born: September 3, 1948 (age 78) Fort Frances, Ontario, Canada
- Height: 6 ft 1 in (185 cm)
- Weight: 185 lb (84 kg; 13 st 3 lb)
- Position: Winger
- Shot: Right
- Played for: Detroit Red Wings; Hartford Whalers
- National team: United States
- NHL draft: Undrafted
- Playing career: 1972–1980
Medal record
Men's ice hockey
Representing United States
Olympic Games
Silver medal – second place	1972 Sapporo	Team

Timothy Kane Sheehy (born September 3, 1948) is a Canadian-American ice hockey player.

== Early life ==
Sheehy was born in Fort Frances, Ontario. He played hockey at Falls High School before joining the Boston College Eagles men's ice hockey team. Sheehy, who has dual citizenship, also played for the American national team 1969 and 1971 World Championships as well as the 1972 Winter Olympic Games, where he won a silver medal.

== Career ==
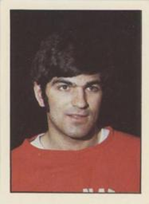
1970s photo of Sheehy

Sheehy was signed by the World Hockey Association's New England Whalers after the Olympics and later also played 433 games for the WHA Edmonton Oilers and Birmingham Bulls before moving on to the National Hockey League where he played a total of 27 games for the Detroit Red Wings and Hartford Whalers before retiring from professional hockey in 1980.

Sheehy was inducted into the United States Hockey Hall of Fame in 1997.

== Personal life ==
Sheehy is the nephew of National Football League player Bronko Nagurski. His younger brother, Neil Sheehy, also played in the NHL.

== Career statistics ==
=== Regular season and playoffs ===
			Regular season					Playoffs
Season	Team	League	GP	G	A	Pts	PIM	GP	G	A	Pts	PIM
1962–63	International Falls High School	HS-MN	—	—	—	—	—	—	—	—	—	—
1963–64	International Falls High School	HS-MN	—	—	—	—	—	—	—	—	—	—
1964–65	International Falls High School	HS-MN	—	—	—	—	—	—	—	—	—	—
1965–66	International Falls High School	HS-MN	21	56	42	98	—	—	—	—	—	—
1967–68	Boston College	ECAC	30	27	30	57	6	—	—	—	—	—
1968–69	Boston College	ECAC	26	19	41	60	36	—	—	—	—	—
1969–70	Boston College	ECAC	24	28	40	68	20	—	—	—	—	—
1970–71	United States National Team	Intl	40	23	34	57	38	—	—	—	—	—
1971–72	United States National Team	Intl	41	37	42	79	51	—	—	—	—	—
1972–73	New England Whalers	WHA	78	33	38	71	30	15	9	14	23	13
1973–74	New England Whalers	WHA	77	29	29	58	22	7	4	2	6	4
1974–75	New England Whalers	WHA	52	21	13	34	18	—	—	—	—	—
1974–75	Edmonton Oilers	WHA	29	8	20	28	4	—	—	—	—	—
1975–76	Edmonton Oilers	WHA	81	34	31	65	17	4	2	2	4	0
1976–77	Edmonton Oilers	WHA	28	15	8	23	4	—	—	—	—	—
1976–77	Birmingham Bulls	WHA	50	26	21	47	44	—	—	—	—	—
1977–78	Birmingham Bulls	WHA	13	4	2	6	5	—	—	—	—	—
1977–78	Detroit Red Wings	NHL	15	0	0	0	0	—	—	—	—	—
1977–78	Kansas City Red Wings	CHL	16	2	6	8	4	—	—	—	—	—
1977–78	New England Whalers	WHA	25	8	11	19	14	13	1	3	4	9
1978–79	Springfield Indians	AHL	49	9	19	28	17	—	—	—	—	—
1978–79	Utica Mohawks	NEHL	21	14	12	26	21	—	—	—	—	—
1979–80	Hartford Whalers	NHL	12	2	1	3	0	—	—	—	—	—
1979–80	Cincinnati Stingers	CHL	10	4	5	9	4	4	2	2	4	0
1979–80	Springfield Indians	AHL	52	25	21	46	10	—	—	—	—	—
WHA totals			433	178	173	351	158	39	16	21	37	26
NHL totals			27	2	1	3	0	—	—	—	—	—

=== International ===
Year	Team	Event	GP	G	A	Pts	PIM
1969	United States	WC	10	1	4	5	8
1971	United States	WC	10	1	2	3	6
1972	United States	OLY	6	4	1	5	0
1972	United States	WC-B	—	—	—	—	—
Senior totals			26	6	7	13	14

== See also ==
- List of members of the United States Hockey Hall of Fame

== Awards and honors ==
Award	Year
ECAC Hockey All-Tournament First Team	1968
All-ECAC Hockey Second Team	1968–69
AHCA East All-American	1968–69; 1969–70
All-ECAC Hockey First Team	1969–70

Awards and achievements
Preceded by Ken Dryden	ECAC Hockey Player of the Year; 1969–70	Succeeded by Bruce Bullock
Preceded by David Merhar	NCAA Ice Hockey Scoring Champion; 1969–70	Succeeded by Louis Frigon
