= Bob Munro =

Canadian ice hockey player (born 1946)

- Born: August 6, 1946 (age 80) Fort William, Ontario, Canada
- Height: 5 ft 9 in (175 cm)
- Weight: 161 lb (73 kg; 11 st 7 lb)
- Position: Centre
- Played for: North Dakota; Muskegon Mohawks; Montreal Voyageurs; Toronto; Orillia Terriers
- NHL draft: Undrafted
- Playing career: 1966–1976

Robert Munro (born August 6, 1946) is a Canadian retired ice hockey centre and coach who was a two-time All-American for North Dakota.

== Career ==
After winning the 1964 junior league championship, Munro began attending North Dakota in the fall of 1965 and joined the varsity team the following year. From the start he was one of the stars of the offense, leading the Fighting Sioux with 30 points as a sophomore. He helped UND finish atop the WCHA that season and pushed the team into the NCAA Tournament. The Sioux, however, played very poorly in the championship, finishing 4th while scoring just one goal in two games. The following year Munro led the team in scoring once more, this time acting as more of a distributor than a scorer. While UND was third in the conference they were still able to earn a share of the conference championship and return to the tournament. For his leadership, Munro was named to both the All-WCHA and All-American teams. Munro helped UND earn one of the biggest upsets in tournament history, scoring the third goal in their 3–1 in over Ken Dryden's powerhouse Cornell squad. UND run was ended by a 0–04 loss to Denver in the championship game.

As a senior, Munro was named team captain and led the Sioux in scoring for the third consecutive year. While his overall totals were low, Munro is one of four players to lead UND in scoring three years running (as of 2020), Ben Cherski, Bill Reichart and Greg Johnson being the others. UND finished 3rd in the conference again, however, they were upset in the first round of the conference tournament and Munro's tenure with the Sioux was ended abruptly.

The next season, Munro benefited from the rapid expansion of the NHL and embarked on a professional career. He played most of two seasons with the Muskegon Mohawks, scoring more than a point per game in both campaigns. In 1971 he got a brief call up to the Montreal Voyageurs of the AHL but Munro went scoreless in 4 contests. Rather than continue with minor professional hockey, Munro returned to college. He attended the University of Toronto and played on the hockey team while furthering his studies. In two seasons with the Varsity Blues, Munro's team's lost just one game and he ended his college career on Toronto's undefeated 1973 championship team. After leaving Toronto, Munro played three seasons of senior hockey before hanging up his skates. He was inducted into the North Dakota Athletic Hall of Fame in 1986.

== Statistics ==
=== Regular season and playoffs ===
			Regular Season					Playoffs
Season	Team	League	GP	G	A	Pts	PIM	GP	G	A	Pts	PIM
1963–64	Fort William Canadiens	TBJHL	—	—	—	—	—	—	—	—	—	—
1964–65	Fort William Canadiens	TBJHL	—	—	—	—	—	—	—	—	—	—
1966–67	North Dakota	WCHA	29	15	15	30	16	—	—	—	—	—
1967–68	North Dakota	WCHA	33	10	26	36	30	—	—	—	—	—
1968–69	North Dakota	WCHA	29	13	30	43	10	—	—	—	—	—
1969–70	Muskegon Mohawks	IHL	55	33	36	69	26	6	0	1	1	2
1970–71	Muskegon Mohawks	IHL	64	32	43	75	22	6	3	2	5	4
1970–71	Montreal Voyageurs	AHL	4	0	0	0	0	—	—	—	—	—
1971–72	Toronto	CIAU	—	19	17	36	18	—	—	—	—	—
1972–73	Toronto	OUAA	—	15	17	32	4	—	—	—	—	—
1973–74	Orillia Terriers	OHA Sr.	34	15	30	45	21	—	—	—	—	—
1974–75	Whitby McDonalds	OHA Sr.	36	16	30	46	20	—	—	—	—	—
1975–76	Thunder Bay Twins	OHA Sr.	20	10	17	27	6	—	—	—	—	—
NCAA Totals			91	38	71	109	56	—	—	—	—	—
IHL Totals			119	65	79	144	48	12	3	3	6	6
CIAU Totals			—	34	34	68	22	—	—	—	—	—
OHA Totals			90	41	77	118	47	—	—	—	—	—

== Awards and honors ==
Award	Year
All-WCHA First Team	1967–68
AHCA West All-American	1967–68
NCAA All-Tournament First Team	1968
All-WCHA First Team	1968–69
AHCA West All-American	1968–69

Awards and achievements
Preceded by Gary Gambucci	WCHA Sophomore of the Year; 1966–67 with Keith Magnuson	Succeeded by Murray McLachlan
