= Connie Hill =

Canadian ice hockey player (1918–2001)

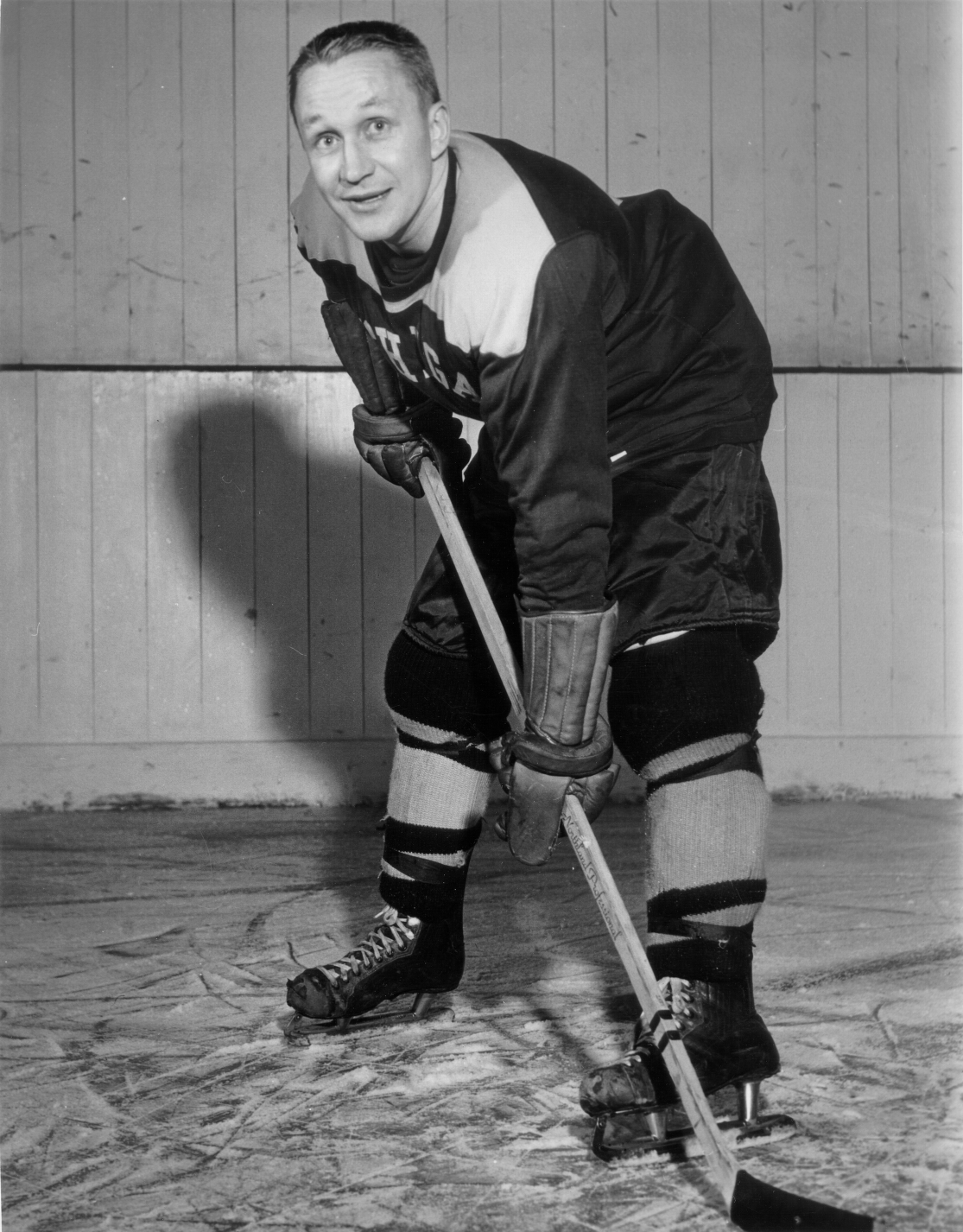
- Hill from 1949 Michiganensian

Personal information
- Full name: Conrad Ralph Hill
- Nationality: Canadian
- Born: January 15, 1918 Copper Cliff, Ontario
- Died: August 31, 2001 (aged 83) Newport, Rhode Island
- Education: University of Michigan

Sport
- Sport: Ice hockey

Conrad Ralph "Connie" Hill (January 15, 1918 – August 31, 2001) was a Canadian ice hockey player and professor of journalism and advertising. During his hockey career, he played for the Belleville Reliance (1942–43), the Philadelphia Falcons (1943-44), the Hollywood Wolves (1944–45), the Michigan Wolverines (1945-49), and the Detroit Auto Club (1949–51). He was twice selected as a college hockey All-American and was the captain of the 1947–48 Michigan Wolverines men's ice hockey team that won the 1948 NCAA Division I Men's Ice Hockey Tournament. He later worked as a professor at the University of Rhode Island.

== Early years ==
Hill was a native of Copper Cliff, Ontario. One source indicates that Hill spent the World War II years playing hockey for the Belleville Reliance (from Belleville, Ontario) of the Ontario Hockey Association's Senior B Series (1942–43), the Philadelphia Falcons of the Eastern Hockey League (1943–44), and the Hollywood Wolves of the Pacific Coast Hockey League (1944–45). Another source reports that Hill served thee years as a tank warfare instructor in the Canadian Army.

== University of Michigan ==
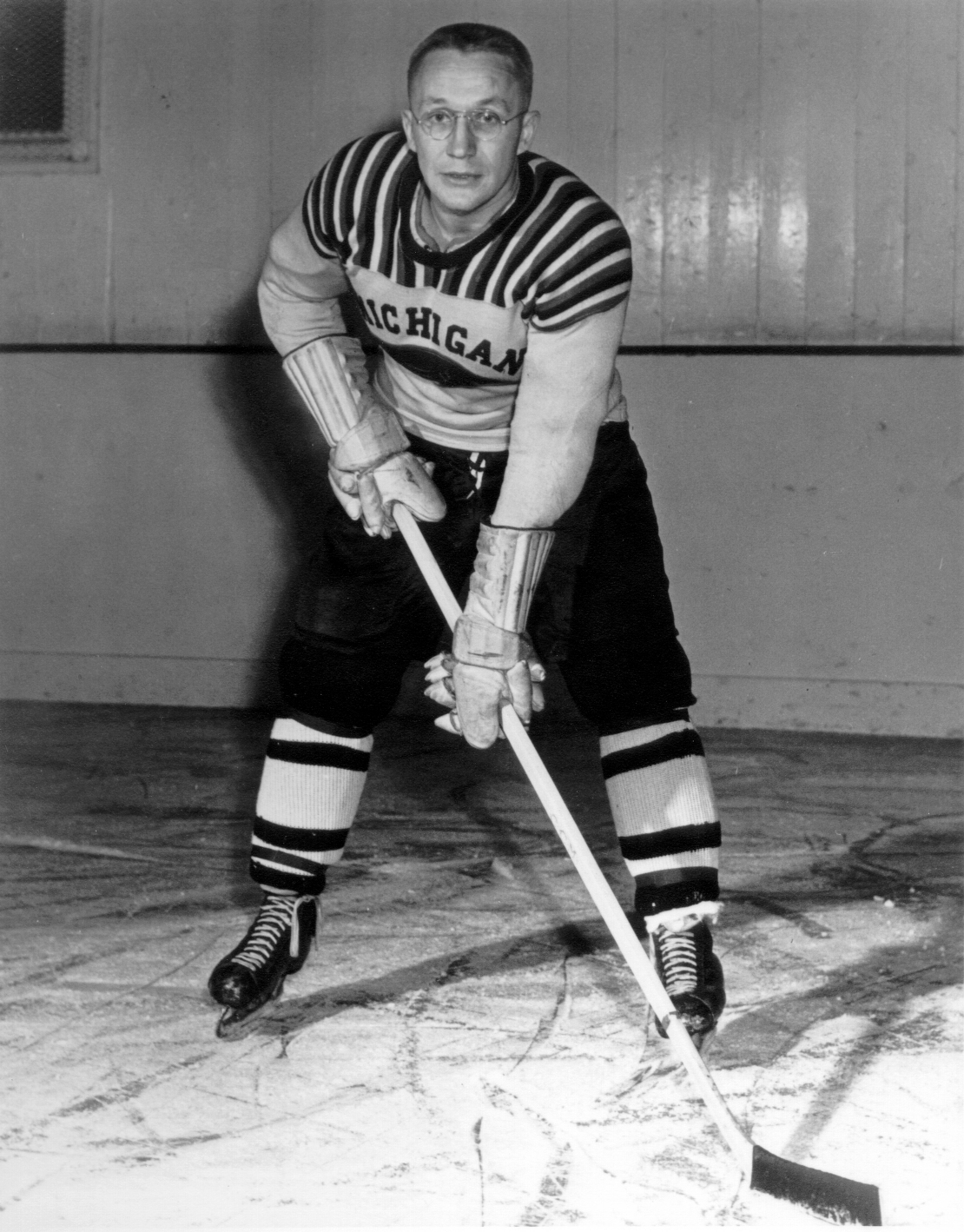
Hill in 1948

In 1945, Hill enrolled at the University of Michigan. While attending Michigan, he played college hockey as a defenseman for the Michigan Wolverines men's ice hockey team from 1945 to 1949 and was the team captain for three consecutive years from the 1945–46 season through the 1947–1948 season. In his history of the Michigan hockey program, John U. Bacon wrote: "With his professorial glasses, thinning hair, and wizened expression, Hill looked much older than his teammates -- and he was, already well into his mid-twenties as a sophomore.". (Hill was 31 when he played his final year of college hockey in 1949.)

In March 1946, Hill was also selected as the MVP of the team for the season just ending. In December 1946, the United Press reported that Hill and teammate Al Renfrew had "solved the housing shortage" confronting the University of Michigan in the post-World War II years by taking up residence in a deserted office at the Coliseum, the ice-skating rink where the team played its home games. According to head coach Vic Heyliger, "I got them jobs at the rink, and they slept on a cot up there," with Hill having the job of keeping a fire going in the Coliseum's lobby so that they didn't freeze at night.

The 1947–48 team captained by Hill compiled a 20–2–1 record, outscored its opponents 141 to 63, and won the 1948 NCAA Division I Men's Ice Hockey Tournament, the first national championship tournament in college hockey. On March 19, 1948, Michigan defeated Boston College in overtime by a score of 6–4 in the semifinal game of the first NCAA "Frozen Four" collegiate ice hockey tournament. Hill scored three goals for a hat trick in the game. At the conclusion of the tournament, Hill was one of two Michigan players selected for the Associated Press All-Tournament team.

Hill received a journalism degree from the University of Michigan in 1950. During his four years of college hockey at the University of Michigan, Hill set school records for career goals (32) and points (87) by a defenseman that were not broken until the late 1970s. He was selected to the college hockey All-American team in both the 1947–1948 and 1948–1949 seasons.

== Later years ==
Hill subsequently played for the Detroit Auto Club team from 1949 to 1951.

After retiring from hockey, Hill returned to school and received a Ph.D. in mass communications from Iowa State University. His dissertation was titled, "Mood, self-derogation and anomia as factors in response unreliability". He was later employed as a professor of journalism and advertising at the University of Rhode Island. In 1960, he published the work, "The Aberrant Image of Advertising". He also published "Insights into applied behavioral research" in 1969, "A bibliography on brands" in 1971, and "Trademarks and brand management" in 1976.

In 1985, Hill was inducted into the University of Michigan Athletic Hall of Honor.

In August 2001, Hill died at Newport Hospital in Newport, Rhode Island, at age 82.

== Awards and honors ==
Award	Year
AHCA Second Team All-American	1947–48
NCAA All-Tournament First Team	1948
AHCA First Team All-American	1948–49
NCAA All-Tournament Second Team	1949
