= Terry Abram =

American ice hockey player (born 1947)

- Born: February 14, 1947 (age 79) South St. Paul, Minnesota, USA
- Height: 6 ft 1 in (185 cm)
- Weight: 188 lb (85 kg; 13 st 6 lb)
- Position: Defenseman
- Played for: North Dakota
- NHL draft: Undrafted
- Playing career: 1966–1969
- Coaching career

Biographical details
- Education: North Dakota

Coaching career (HC unless noted)
- 1971–1977: Roseau High School
- 1977–1979: Anoka High School
- 1982–1987: St. Thomas

Head coaching record
- Overall: 105–45–2 (.697) [college]
- Tournaments: 1–4–1 (.250)

Terry Abram is an American retired ice hockey defenseman and coach who was an All-American for North Dakota.

== Career ==
Abram was a standout defenseman at South St. Paul HS helping the team reach the state semifinal as a senior. He was one of the few American players recruited to North Dakota during the 1960s and began playing for the varsity club in the fall of 1966. In his first two seasons, Abram helped UND win back-to-back conference co-championships and reach the NCAA tournament twice. Abram was named an All-American in 1968 and hoped to lead his team into the national championship for a third consecutive season the following year. Unfortunately, North Dakota was upset in the first round of the WCHA tournament and Abram's college career ended with the loss.

After graduating, Abram turned down a chance to play in the Chicago Blackhawks organization and instead turned to coaching. He spent the rest of the decade behind the bench for two different high schools in Minnesota, Roseau and Anoka. While at Roseau, Abram coached future NHLer Neal Broten. In 1982 Abram became the head coach for St. Thomas and he immediately turned around the program. While he was with the program for only five years, Abram provided several first for the Tommies: he was the first coach to win 20 games in a season, recording 25 wins in both 1985 and '86. He led the team to the NCAA Tournament for the first time in 1984. Two years later he guided St. Thomas to the inaugural MIAC tournament championship. Abram resigned in 1987, never having a losing season in college hockey.

In 2007 Abram was in the inaugural class of the South St. Paul Athletic Hall of fame.

== Statistics ==
=== Regular season and playoffs ===
			Regular Season					Playoffs
Season	Team	League	GP	G	A	Pts	PIM	GP	G	A	Pts	PIM
1961–62	South St. Paul	MN-HS	—	—	—	—	—	—	—	—	—	—
1962–63	South St. Paul	MN-HS	—	—	—	—	—	—	—	—	—	—
1963–64	South St. Paul	MN-HS	—	—	—	—	—	—	—	—	—	—
1964–65	South St. Paul	MN-HS	—	—	—	—	—	—	—	—	—	—
1966–67	North Dakota	WCHA	28	1	14	15	52	—	—	—	—	—
1967–68	North Dakota	WCHA	33	6	14	20	48	—	—	—	—	—
1968–69	North Dakota	WCHA	29	3	26	39	39	—	—	—	—	—
NCAA Totals			90	10	54	64	139	—	—	—	—	—

== College head coaching record ==
Record table
Season	Team	Overall	Conference	Standing	Postseason
St. Thomas Tommies (MIAC) (1982–1987)
1982–83	St. Thomas	19–9–0	14–2–0	1st	
1983–84	St. Thomas	20–10–1	13–3–0	2nd	NCAA Quarterfinals
1984–85	St. Thomas	25–7–0	14–2–0	1st	NCAA Quarterfinals
1985–86	St. Thomas	25–6–1	15–1–0	1st	NCAA Quarterfinals
1986–87	St. Thomas	16–13–0	10–6–0	3rd	MIAC Runner-Up
St. Thomas:		105–45–2	66–14–0		
Total:		105–45–2			
National champion Postseason invitational champion Conference regular season champion Conference regular season and conference tournament champion Division regular season champion Division regular season and conference tournament champion Conference tournament champion

== Awards and honors ==
Award	Year
All-WCHA First Team	1967–68; 1968–69
AHCA West All-American	1967–68
