= Herb Wakabayashi =

Canadian ice hockey player (1944–2015)

- Born: December 23, 1944 Neys, Ontario, Canada
- Died: June 2, 2015 (aged 70) Sapporo, Japan
- Height: 5 ft 5 in (165 cm)
- Weight: 150 lb (68 kg; 10 st 10 lb)
- Position: Centre
- Shot: N/A
- Played for: Boston University Terriers
- Playing career: 1962–1983

Osamu "Herb" Wakabayashi (December 23, 1944 – June 2, 2015) was a Canadian-Japanese professional ice hockey player.

== Biography and career ==
He was born in Neys, Ontario, and moved to Chatham, Ontario, where he excelled at both hockey and baseball. In 1964, Wakabayashi entered Boston University where he played freshman hockey. In his sophomore year, he moved up to varsity where he set a Boston University and ECAC record for assists in a season with 51. In the same year he was named the most valuable player of The Beanpot.

The following year his accolades continued when he was named to the All America, All East and All New England first teams, as well as the Most Valuable Player on his team and Athlete of the Year of the University. As a senior, he again received All American and All New England honors. He finished his illustrious career with the most assists in Terrier history with 90 and second all time scorer with 145 points. Also in his senior year he played baseball where he hit .367 leading the Terriers to the regional finals of the ECAC playoffs.

In 1972, he and his brother Mel moved to Japan where they represented the Japanese national ice hockey team. He played in three Olympics, including the 1980 games at Lake Placid. He carried the Japanese flag at the opening ceremony of the 1980 Winter Olympics. He died on June 2, 2015, in Sapporo, Japan.

== Awards and honors ==
Award	Year
ECAC Hockey All-Tournament Second Team	1967, 1968, 1969
All-ECAC Hockey Second Team	1967–68
AHCA East All-American	1967–68
All-ECAC Hockey First Team	1968–69
AHCA East All-American	1968–69

Awards and achievements
Preceded by Kent Parrot	ECAC Hockey Rookie of the Year; 1966–67	Succeeded by Mike Hyndman
Preceded by Doug Ferguson	NCAA Ice Hockey Scoring Champion; 1966–67 (with Jerry York)	Succeeded by Delbert Dehate
