= Brian Cornell (ice hockey) =

Canadian ice hockey player

- Born: March 23, 1946 Niagara Falls, Ontario, Canada
- Died: July 22, 2022 (aged 76)
- Height: 6 ft 0 in (183 cm)
- Weight: 183 lb (83 kg; 13 st 1 lb)
- Position: Wing
- Played for: Cornell
- NHL draft: Undrafted
- Playing career: 1966–1972

Brian L. Cornell was a Canadian ice hockey winger who was a two-time All-American for Cornell University.

== Career ==
Cornell was not a star player in juniors, averaging less than a point per game for the Niagara Falls Flyers. Despite the low production, he was recruited to Cornell University and began attending in the fall of 1965. Cornell played on a freshman team alongside Ken Dryden that went undefeated. A year later Cornell was a member of the varsity squad and began the season as a depth scorer for the team. In the first ten games he recorded 13 points but, in the first game of the Boston Arena Christmas Tournament, Cornell tore ligaments in his knee and missed the remainder of the season. Cornell was forced to watch as the Big Red nearly ran the table without him and captured the program's first NCAA Championship and the first championship of any kind since 1911.

Cornell was ready for the start of the following season and, with many of the '67 Big Red's top scorers graduating, he was able to assume a more prominent role in the offense. Cornell had a breakout season, leading the team with 29 goals and 61 points in 28 games. He was named Second Team All-conference and All-American and helped Cornell compile an astounding 26–1 record heading into the national tournament. The team, however, was stifled by Mike Curran in the semifinal and lost 1–3. The Big Red finished 3rd in the tournament and Cornell was the only player not in the title match to appear on the All-Tournament First Team. As a senior, Cornell was named team co-Captain with Bruce Pattison and responded by setting a program record for points in a season with 74. He finished third in the nation and was an All-American once more. The Big Red again entered the NCAA Tournament 26–1 but, despite a scare from Michigan Tech, reached the championship match. Cornell scored his final collegiate goal in the second period to tie the score at 2-all, but Denver carried the day in the third and skated away with the championship.

After graduating, Cornell remained at the university in the Graduate School of Business and Public Administration. While he continued his studies he both coached the freshman team in its final year of existence and played for the Syracuse Stars in the team's last season. He was inducted into the Cornell Athletic Hall of Fame in 1969.

== Career statistics ==
=== Regular season and playoffs ===
			Regular Season					Playoffs
Season	Team	League	GP	G	A	Pts	PIM	GP	G	A	Pts	PIM
1962–63	Niagara Falls Flyers	OHA	3	0	0	0	0	—	—	—	—	—
1963–64	Niagara Falls Flyers	OHA	21	11	9	20	0	—	—	—	—	—
1964–65	Niagara Falls Flyers	OHA	3	0	1	1	0	—	—	—	—	—
1966–67	Cornell	ECAC Hockey	10	2	11	13	0	—	—	—	—	—
1967–68	Cornell	ECAC Hockey	28	29	32	61	22	—	—	—	—	—
1968–69	Cornell	ECAC Hockey	29	22	52	74	26	—	—	—	—	—
1969–70	Syracuse Stars	Independent	—	—	—	—	—	—	—	—	—	—
1971–72	Braintree Hawks	NEnHL	—	—	—	—	—	—	—	—	—	—
OHA Totals			27	11	10	21	0	—	—	—	—	—
NCAA Totals			67	53	95	148	48	—	—	—	—	—

== Awards and honors ==
Award	Year
All-ECAC Hockey Second Team	1967–68
AHCA East All-American	1967–68
ECAC Hockey All-Tournament First Team	1968
NCAA All-Tournament Team	1968
All-ECAC Hockey First Team	1968–69
AHCA East All-American	1968–69
ECAC Hockey All-Tournament First Team	1969
NCAA All-Tournament Team	1969
