= List of Division I AHCA All-American Teams =

The Division I AHCA All-American Teams are an annual honor bestowed by the American Hockey Coaches Association to the college hockey players judged to be the top performers in their division. Each team is composed of at least one goaltender, two defensemen and three forwards on ice hockey programs. At least one all-star team has been named since the start of NCAA tournament play in 1947–48 after the conclusion of either the regular season or the conference tournaments.

Initially the All-American teams weren't named by ACHA. in the first ten years of the teams the players were selected by some combination of media members and team officials. In some years only players from teams that participated in the NCAA tournament were eligible. In each of the first ten years two teams worth of players were voted on and usually assorted into a first- and second-team. In some years, however, no distinction was made and the players were all considered to have received first-team honors. The format was changed for the 1957–58 season, creating an All-American team for both the East and West regions. In the early years of this format the All-American teams were dominated by two conferences (the WCHA in the west and the ECAC in the east) as there were only two major conferences competing in NCAA hockey (the WCHA began play in 1959–60 followed by the ECAC two years later). While the CCHA began play in 1971–72 it would only provide one player to the All-American teams until a conference realignment in 1981–82 when it became considered on par with the major conferences. The ECAC would continue to dominate the eastern teams until an internal schism split the conference and Hockey East was formed in 1984–85. Due in part to an influx of member teams to fill the rolls of the four major conferences as well as increased inter-conference competition for recognition, the AHCA began to name two teams for each region (first- and second-teams) which it has continued to do since 1983–84.

As of 2024–25 the conferences that comprise the east region are Atlantic Hockey America, the ECAC and Hockey East while the western region contains the Big Ten, CCHA and NCHC.

== All-American teams ==
=== First Team ===
==== 1940s ====
1947–48
Player	Pos	Team
Ian Watson	G	California
Ross Smith	D	Michigan
Butch Songin	D	Boston College
Pat Finnegan	F	California
Bill Riley	F	Dartmouth
Joe Slattery	F	Colorado College

1948–49
Player	Pos	Team
Dick Desmond	G	Dartmouth
Ian Watson	G	California
Connie Hill	D	Michigan
Butch Songin	D	Boston College
Jim Starrak	D	Colorado College
Dick Starrak	D	Michigan
Wally Gacek	F	Michigan
Wally Grant	F	Michigan
Bill Riley	F	Dartmouth
Joe Riley	F	Dartmouth
Dick Rowell	F	Colorado College
Joe Slattery	F	Colorado College

==== 1950s ====
1949–50
Player	Pos	Team
Ralph Bevins	G	Boston University
Ross Smith	D	Michigan
Jim Starrak	D	Colorado College
Jack Garrity	F	Boston University
Warren Lewis	F	Boston College
Arnold Oss	F	Dartmouth

1950–51
Player	Pos	Team
Larry Ross	G	Minnesota
Donald Whiston	G	Brown
Joe deBastiani	D	Michigan Tech
Bob Heathcott	D	Michigan
John Noah	D	North Dakota
Jim Starrak	D	Colorado College
Gil Burford	F	Michigan
Neil Celley	F	Michigan
Tony Frasca	F	Colorado College
Jack Garrity	F	Boston University
Clifford Harrison	F	Dartmouth
John McKennell	F	Michigan
Gordon Watters	F	Minnesota

1951–52
Player	Pos	Team
Ray Picard	G	Northeastern
John Grocott	D	Dartmouth
Eddie Miller	D	Denver
Tony Frasca	F	Colorado College
Ron Hartwell	F	Colorado College
Bob Wheeler	F	Brown

1952–53
Player	Pos	Team
Jim Mattson	G	Minnesota
Ray Picard	G	Northeastern
Doug Binning	D	Middlebury
Herb LaFontaine	D	Rensselaer
Alex MacLellan	D	Michigan
Bob Monahan	D	Michigan Tech
Hank Bothfeld	F	Princeton
Wellington Burtnett	F	Boston College
Ben Cherski	F	North Dakota
Frank Chiarelli	F	Rensselaer
John Mayasich	F	Minnesota
Richard Rodenhiser	F	Boston University

1953–54
Player	Pos	Team
Spike Schultz	G	North Dakota
Bob Kiley	D	Boston College
Ken Yackel	D	Minnesota
Ben Cherski	F	North Dakota
Richard Dougherty	F	Minnesota
John Mayasich	F	Minnesota

1954–55
Player	Pos	Team
Bill Sloan	G	St. Lawrence
Doug Silverberg	D	Colorado College
Ken Yackel	D	Minnesota
Bill Cleary	F	Harvard
Bill Reichart	F	North Dakota
Clare Smith	F	Colorado College

1955–56
Player	Pos	Team
Lorne Howes	G	Michigan
Bob Schiller	D	Michigan
Doug Silverberg	D	Colorado College
Garry Kearns	F	Rensselaer
Bill MacFarland	F	Michigan
Ed Rowe	F	Clarkson

1956–57
Player	Pos	Team
Jack McCartan	G	Minnesota
Don Wishart	D	Colorado College
Pat Presley	D	St. Lawrence
Bill Hay	F	Colorado College
Bill Reichart	F	North Dakota
Ed Rowe	F	Clarkson

1957–58
East
Player	Pos	Team
Eddie MacDonald	G	Clarkson
Bob Dupuis	D	Boston University
Don MacLeod	D	Boston University
Bob Cleary	F	Harvard
Bob Marquis	F	Boston University
Paul Midghall	F	Rensselaer
West
Player	Pos	Team
Jack McCartan	G	Minnesota
Bill Steenson	D	North Dakota
Ed Zemrau	D	Denver
Bill Hay	F	Colorado College
Dick Burg	F	Minnesota
Bob McCusker	F	Colorado College
Bob White	F	Michigan

1958–59
East
Player	Pos	Team
Gerry Jones	G	Yale
Joe Jangro	D	Boston College
Pat Presley	D	St. Lawrence
Bob Marquis	F	Boston University
Paul Midghall	F	Rensselaer
Phil Latreille	F	Middlebury
West
Player	Pos	Team
Joe Selinger	G	Michigan State
Bill Steenson	D	North Dakota
Bob Watt	D	Michigan
John Kosiancic	F	Michigan Tech
Bob White	F	Michigan
Murray Williamson	F	Minnesota

==== 1960s ====
1959–60
East
Player	Pos	Team
Tom Wahman	G	Dartmouth
Red Martin	D	Boston College
Rusty Ingersoll	D	Dartmouth
Terry Slater	F	St. Lawrence
Phil Latreille	F	Middlebury
Art Chisholm	F	Northeastern
West
Player	Pos	Team
George Cuculick	G	Michigan Tech
Marty Howe	D	Denver
George Konik	D	Denver
Paul Coppo	F	Michigan Tech
Reg Morelli	F	North Dakota
Bill Masterton	F	Denver

1960–61
East
Player	Pos	Team
Rod Blackburn	G	New Hampshire
Arlie Parker	D	St. Lawrence
Red Martin	D	Boston College
Terry Slater	F	St. Lawrence
Phil Latreille	F	Middlebury
Art Chisholm	F	Northeastern
West
Player	Pos	Team
George Kirkwood	G	Denver
Marty Howe	D	Denver
Grant Munro	D	Denver
Red Berenson	F	Michigan
Bill Masterton	F	Denver
Jerry Walker	F	Denver

1961–62
East
Player	Pos	Team
Frank Stephenson	G	Colby
David Johnston	D	Harvard
Arlie Parker	D	St. Lawrence
Bill Hogan	F	Boston College
Ron Ryan	F	Colby
Dates Fryberger	F	Middlebury
West
Player	Pos	Team
John Chandik	G	Michigan State
Henry Akervall	D	Michigan Tech
Elov Seger	D	Michigan Tech
Lou Angotti	F	Michigan Tech
Red Berenson	F	Michigan
Jerry Sullivan	F	Michigan Tech

1962–63
East
Player	Pos	Team
Richie Broadbelt	G	St. Lawrence
Pat Brophy	D	Clarkson
David Johnston	D	Harvard
Cal Wagner	D	Clarkson
Bob Brinkworth	F	Rensselaer
Jack Leetch	F	Boston College
Dates Fryberger	F	Middlebury
West
Player	Pos	Team
Garry Bauman	G	Michigan Tech
Lou Nanne	D	Minnesota
Don Ross	D	North Dakota
George Hill	F	Michigan Tech
Al McLean	F	North Dakota
Dave Merrifield	F	North Dakota
Bill Staub	F	Denver

1963–64
East
Player	Pos	Team
Bob Perani	G	St. Lawrence
Richie Green	D	Boston University
Larry Kish	D	Providence
Cal Wagner	D	Clarkson
Corby Adams	F	Clarkson
Bob Brinkworth	F	Rensselaer
Jerry Knightley	F	Rensselaer
West
Player	Pos	Team
Garry Bauman	G	Michigan Tech
Carl Lackey	D	Michigan State
Tom Polanic	D	Michigan
Craig Falkman	F	Minnesota
John Simus	F	Colorado College
Gordon Wilkie	F	Michigan

1964–65
East
Player	Pos	Team
Terry Yurkiewicz	G	Clarkson
Jack Ferreira	G	Boston University
Robert Gaudreau	D	Brown
Tom Ross	D	Boston University
John Cunniff	F	Boston College
Grant Heffernan	F	Providence
Jerry Knightley	F	Rensselaer
West
Player	Pos	Team
Tony Esposito	G	Michigan Tech
Don Ross	D	North Dakota
Wayne Smith	D	Denver
Doug Roberts	F	Michigan State
Mel Wakabayashi	F	Michigan
Doug Woog	F	Minnesota

1965–66
East
Player	Pos	Team
Terry Yurkiewicz	G	Clarkson
Robert Gaudreau	D	Brown
Tom Ross	D	Boston University
Fred Bassi	F	Boston University
John Cunniff	F	Boston College
Doug Ferguson	F	Cornell
West
Player	Pos	Team
Tony Esposito	G	Michigan Tech
Bob Hill	D	Minnesota–Duluth
Bruce Riutta	D	Michigan Tech
Wayne Smith	D	Denver
Terry Casey	F	North Dakota
Bob Lindberg	F	Colorado College
Doug Volmar	F	Michigan State

1966–67
East
Player	Pos	Team
Ken Dryden	G	Cornell
Brian Gilmour	D	Boston University
Harry Orr	D	Cornell
Doug Ferguson	F	Cornell
John Morrison	F	Yale
Jerry York	F	Boston College
West
Player	Pos	Team
Tony Esposito	G	Michigan Tech
Rick Best	G	Michigan Tech
Jerry Lafond	D	North Dakota
Bruce Riutta	D	Michigan Tech
Keith Christiansen	F	Minnesota–Duluth
Bob Lindberg	F	Colorado College
Gary Milroy	F	Michigan Tech
Jim Wiste	F	Denver

1967–68
East
Player	Pos	Team
Ken Dryden	G	Cornell
Bruce Pattison	D	Cornell
Skip Stanowski	D	Cornell
Brian Cornell	F	Cornell
Wayne Small	F	Brown
Herb Wakabayashi	F	Boston University
West
Player	Pos	Team
Jim Keough	G	Michigan
Terry Abram	D	North Dakota
Keith Magnuson	D	Denver
Gary Gambucci	F	Minnesota
Bob Munro	F	North Dakota
Jim Wiste	F	Denver

1968–69
East
Player	Pos	Team
Ken Dryden	G	Cornell
Paul Hurley	D	Boston College
Bruce Pattison	D	Cornell
Joe Cavanagh	F	Harvard
Brian Cornell	F	Cornell
Tim Sheehy	F	Boston College
Peter Tufford	F	Cornell
Herb Wakabayashi	F	Boston University
West
Player	Pos	Team
Rick Duffett	G	Michigan State
Keith Magnuson	D	Denver
John Marks	D	North Dakota
Bob Collyard	F	Colorado College
Al Karlander	F	Michigan Tech
George Morrison	F	Denver
Bob Munro	F	North Dakota

==== 1970s ====
1969–70
East
Player	Pos	Team
Bruce Bullock	G	Clarkson
Dan Lodboa	D	Cornell
Mike Hyndman	D	Boston University
Curt Bennett	F	Brown
Joe Cavanagh	F	Harvard
Tommy Earl	F	Colgate
Tim Sheehy	F	Boston College
West
Player	Pos	Team
Murray McLachlan	G	Minnesota
Ron Busniuk	D	Minnesota–Duluth
John Jagger	D	Wisconsin
John Marks	D	North Dakota
Wally Olds	D	Minnesota
Bob Collyard	F	Colorado College
Murray Keogan	F	Minnesota–Duluth
George Morrison	F	Denver

1970–71
East
Player	Pos	Team
Bruce Bullock	G	Clarkson
Bob Brown	D	Boston University
Steve Warr	D	Clarkson
Joe Cavanagh	F	Harvard
Kevin Pettit	F	Cornell
Steve Stirling	F	Boston University
West
Player	Pos	Team
Morris Trewin	G	Michigan Tech
Mike Christie	D	Denver
Bob Murray	D	Michigan Tech
Walt Ledingham	F	Minnesota–Duluth
Don Thompson	F	Michigan State
Vic Venasky	F	Denver

1971–72
East
Player	Pos	Team
Dan Brady	G	Boston University
Bob Brown	D	Boston University
Steve Warr	D	Clarkson
John Danby	F	Boston University
Larry Fullan	F	Cornell
Dave Hynes	F	Harvard
West
Player	Pos	Team
Jim Watt	G	Michigan State
Jeff Rotsch	D	Wisconsin
Alan Hangsleben	D	North Dakota
Bob Winograd	F	Colorado College
Walt Ledingham	F	Minnesota–Duluth
Doug Palazzari	F	Colorado College
Tom Peluso	F	Denver

1972–73
East
Player	Pos	Team
Ed Walsh	G	Boston University
Tom Mellor	D	Boston College
Keith Smith	D	Brown
Gordie Clark	F	New Hampshire
Steve Dolloff	F	Boston University
Bob McManama	F	Harvard
West
Player	Pos	Team
Ron Grahame	G	Denver
Bob Boyd	D	Michigan State
Bill Nyrop	D	Notre Dame
Pat Boutette	F	Minnesota–Duluth
Eddie Bumbacco	F	Notre Dame
Rob Palmer	F	Denver

1973–74
East
Player	Pos	Team
Cap Raeder	G	New Hampshire
George Kuzmicz	D	Cornell
Vic Stanfield	D	Boston University
Bill Burlington	F	Boston University
Gordie Clark	F	New Hampshire
Randy Roth	F	Harvard
West
Player	Pos	Team
Robbie Moore	G	Michigan
Norm Barnes	D	Michigan State
Jim Nahrgang	D	Michigan Tech
Steve Colp	F	Michigan State
Doug Palazzari	F	Colorado College
Mike Zuke	F	Michigan Tech

1974–75
East
Player	Pos	Team
Brian Petrovek	G	Harvard
Vic Stanfield	D	Boston University
Ron Wilson	D	Providence
Rick Meagher	F	Boston University
Tim O'Connell	F	Vermont
Randy Roth	F	Harvard
West
Player	Pos	Team
Eddie Mio	G	Colorado College
Les Auge	D	Minnesota
Brian Engblom	D	Wisconsin
Bob D'Alvise	F	Michigan Tech
Mike Polich	F	Minnesota
Tom Ross	F	Michigan State

1975–76
East
Player	Pos	Team
Brian Shields	G	Clarkson
Peter Brown	D	Boston University
Ron Wilson	D	Providence
Cliff Cox	F	New Hampshire
Jamie Hislop	F	New Hampshire
Rick Meagher	F	Boston University
Bill Gilligan	F	Brown
West
Player	Pos	Team
Eddie Mio	G	Colorado College
Jack Brownschidle	D	Notre Dame
Craig Norwich	D	Wisconsin
Tom Ross	F	Michigan State
Mike Eaves	F	Wisconsin
Mike Zuke	F	Michigan Tech

1976–77
East
Player	Pos	Team
Brian Shields	G	Clarkson
Bill Blackwood	D	Clarkson
Tim Burke	D	New Hampshire
Rick Meagher	F	Boston University
Bob Miller	F	New Hampshire
Dave Taylor	F	Clarkson
West
Player	Pos	Team
Julian Baretta	G	Wisconsin
Jack Brownschidle	D	Notre Dame
Craig Norwich	D	Wisconsin
Dave Debol	F	Michigan
Mike Eaves	F	Wisconsin
Brian Walsh	F	Notre Dame

1977–78
East
Player	Pos	Team
Mike Laycock	G	Brown
Bill Blackwood	D	Clarkson
Peter Shier	D	Cornell
Ralph Cox	F	New Hampshire
Joe Mullen	F	Boston College
Lance Nethery	F	Cornell
West
Player	Pos	Team
Ernie Glanville	G	Denver
Curt Giles	D	Minnesota–Duluth
Ken Morrow	D	Bowling Green
Doug Berry	F	Denver
Mike Eaves	F	Wisconsin
Mark Johnson	F	Wisconsin

1978–79
East
Player	Pos	Team
Jim Craig	G	Boston University
Louis Cote	D	Vermont
Jack O'Callahan	D	Boston University
Ralph Cox	F	New Hampshire
Joe Mullen	F	Boston College
Lance Nethery	F	Cornell
West
Player	Pos	Team
Bob Iwabuchi	G	North Dakota
Bill Baker	D	Minnesota
Curt Giles	D	Minnesota–Duluth
Mark Johnson	F	Wisconsin
Kevin Maxwell	F	North Dakota
Mark Pavelich	F	Minnesota–Duluth

==== 1980s ====
1979–80
East
Player	Pos	Team
Mark Holden	G	Brown
Andre Aubut	D	Maine
Louis Cote	D	Vermont
Bill Army	F	Boston College
Ross Brownridge	F	Dartmouth
Craig Homola	F	Vermont
West
Player	Pos	Team
Roy Schultz	G	Wisconsin
Dave Feamster	D	Colorado College
Howard Walker	D	North Dakota
Theran Welsh	D	Wisconsin
Murray Eaves	F	Michigan
Tim Harrer	F	Minnesota
Greg Meredith	F	Notre Dame
Mark Taylor	F	North Dakota

1980–81
East
Player	Pos	Team
Don Sylvestri	G	Clarkson
Mark Fusco	D	Harvard
Ed Small	D	Clarkson
Sandy Beadle	F	Northeastern
Bryan Cleaver	F	Clarkson
Gary Conn	F	Maine
West
Player	Pos	Team
Paul Fricker	G	Michigan
Marc Chorney	D	North Dakota
Tim Watters	D	Michigan Tech
Steve Bozek	F	Northern Michigan
Neal Broten	F	Minnesota
Aaron Broten	F	Minnesota

1981–82
East
Player	Pos	Team
Brian Hayward	G	Cornell
Mark Fusco	D	Harvard
Chris Renaud	D	Colgate
Andy Brickley	F	New Hampshire
Steve Cruickshank	F	Clarkson
Kirk McCaskill	F	Vermont
West
Player	Pos	Team
Ron Scott	G	Michigan State
Bruce Driver	D	Wisconsin
Brian MacLellan	D	Bowling Green
Brian Hills	F	Bowling Green
George McPhee	F	Bowling Green
John Newberry	F	Wisconsin

1982–83
East
Player	Pos	Team
Darren Eliot	G	Cornell
Gray Weicker	G	St. Lawrence
Mark Fusco	D	Harvard
Randy Velischek	D	Providence
Bob Brooke	F	Yale
Kurt Kleinendorst	F	Providence
Colin Patterson	F	Clarkson
West
Player	Pos	Team
Ron Scott	G	Michigan State
Doug Lidster	D	Colorado College
James Patrick	D	North Dakota
Kirt Bjork	F	Notre Dame
Patrick Flatley	F	Wisconsin
Brian Hills	F	Bowling Green

1983–84
East
Player	Pos	Team
Cleon Daskalakis	G	Boston University
Bob Armstrong	D	Clarkson
Dave Fretz	D	Clarkson
John Carter	F	Rensselaer
Adam Oates	F	Rensselaer
Steve Smith	F	Colgate
West
Player	Pos	Team
Jon Casey	G	North Dakota
Garry Galley	D	Bowling Green
Tom Kurvers	D	Minnesota–Duluth
Dan Kane	F	Bowling Green
Paul Pooley	F	Ohio State
Bill Watson	F	Minnesota–Duluth

1984–85
East
Player	Pos	Team
Chris Terreri	G	Providence
Dave Fretz	D	Clarkson
Ken Hammond	D	Rensselaer
Tim Army	F	Providence
Scott Fusco	F	Harvard
Adam Oates	F	Rensselaer
West
Player	Pos	Team
Rick Kosti	G	Minnesota–Duluth
Norm Maciver	D	Minnesota–Duluth
Dan McFall	D	Michigan State
Pat Micheletti	F	Minnesota
Kelly Miller	F	Michigan State
Craig Simpson	F	Michigan State
Bill Watson	F	Minnesota–Duluth

1985–86
East
Player	Pos	Team
Doug Dadswell	G	Cornell
Cliff Abrecht	D	Princeton
Mike Dark	D	Rensselaer
Scott Fusco	F	Harvard
Scott Harlow	F	Boston College
Joe Nieuwendyk	F	Cornell
West
Player	Pos	Team
Gary Kruzich	G	Bowling Green
Wayne Gagné	D	Western Michigan
Norm Maciver	D	Minnesota–Duluth
Dallas Gaume	F	Denver
Mike Donnelly	F	Michigan State
Dan Dorion	F	Western Michigan

1986–87
East
Player	Pos	Team
Bruce Racine	G	Northeastern
Mark Benning	D	Harvard
Brian Leetch	D	Boston College
Craig Janney	F	Boston College
Lane MacDonald	F	Harvard
Joe Nieuwendyk	F	Cornell
West
Player	Pos	Team
Gary Kruzich	G	Bowling Green
Wayne Gagné	D	Western Michigan
Ian Kidd	D	North Dakota
Tony Hrkac	F	North Dakota
Bob Joyce	F	North Dakota
Mitch Messier	F	Michigan State

1987–88
East
Player	Pos	Team
Bruce Racine	G	Northeastern
Jack Capuano	D	Maine
Brian McColgan	D	St. Lawrence
Réjean Boivin	F	Colgate
Dave Capuano	F	Maine
Pete Lappin	F	St. Lawrence
West
Player	Pos	Team
Robb Stauber	G	Minnesota
Scott Paluch	D	Bowling Green
Paul Stanton	D	Wisconsin
Steve Johnson	F	North Dakota
Paul Ranheim	F	Wisconsin
Mark Vermette	F	Lake Superior State

1988–89
East
Player	Pos	Team
Mike O'Neill	G	Yale
Greg Brown	D	Boston College
Mike Hurlbut	D	St. Lawrence
Dave Capuano	F	Maine
Lane MacDonald	F	Harvard
Kyle McDonough	F	Vermont
West
Player	Pos	Team
Bruce Hoffort	G	Lake Superior State
Kord Cernich	D	Lake Superior State
Myles O'Connor	D	Michigan
Kip Miller	F	Michigan State
Greg Parks	F	Bowling Green
Bobby Reynolds	F	Michigan State

==== 1990s ====
1989–90
East
Player	Pos	Team
Dave Gagnon	G	Colgate
Greg Brown	D	Boston College
Rob Cowie	D	Northeastern
David Emma	F	Boston College
Steve Heinze	F	Boston College
Joé Juneau	F	Rensselaer
West
Player	Pos	Team
Chad Erickson	G	Minnesota–Duluth
Rob Blake	D	Bowling Green
Russ Parent	D	North Dakota
Nelson Emerson	F	Bowling Green
Kip Miller	F	Michigan State
Gary Shuchuk	F	Wisconsin

1990–91
East
Player	Pos	Team
Les Kuntar	G	St. Lawrence
Keith Carney	D	Maine
Dan Ratushny	D	Cornell
David Emma	F	Boston College
Shawn McEachern	F	Boston University
Jean-Yves Roy	F	Maine
West
Player	Pos	Team
Darrin Madeley	G	Lake Superior State
Brad Werenka	D	Northern Michigan
Jason Woolley	D	Michigan State
Scott Beattie	F	Northern Michigan
Jim Dowd	F	Lake Superior State
Greg Johnson	F	North Dakota

1991–92
East
Player	Pos	Team
Parris Duffus	G	Cornell
Mike Brewer	D	Brown
Daniel Laperrière	D	St. Lawrence
Scott Pellerin	F	Maine
David Sacco	F	Boston University
Jean-Yves Roy	F	Maine
West
Player	Pos	Team
Darrin Madeley	G	Lake Superior State
Mark Astley	D	Lake Superior State
Joby Messier	D	Michigan State
Dallas Drake	F	Northern Michigan
Denny Felsner	F	Michigan
Dwayne Norris	F	Michigan State

1992–93
East
Player	Pos	Team
Mike Dunham	G	Maine
Chris Imes	D	Maine
Jack Duffy	D	Yale
David Sacco	F	Boston University
Ted Drury	F	Harvard
Paul Kariya	F	Maine
West
Player	Pos	Team
Jamie Ram	G	Michigan Tech
Barry Richter	D	Wisconsin
Brett Hauer	D	Minnesota–Duluth
Bryan Smolinski	F	Michigan State
Derek Plante	F	Minnesota–Duluth
Greg Johnson	F	North Dakota

1993–94
East
Player	Pos	Team
Dwayne Roloson	G	UMass Lowell
Brian Mueller	D	Clarkson
Sean McCann	D	Harvard
Mike Pomichter	F	Boston University
Craig Conroy	F	Clarkson
Steve Martins	F	Harvard
West
Player	Pos	Team
Jamie Ram	G	Michigan Tech
Shawn Reid	D	Colorado College
John Gruden	D	Ferris State
David Oliver	F	Michigan
Brian Wiseman	F	Michigan
Chris Marinucci	F	Minnesota–Duluth

1994–95
East
Player	Pos	Team
Blair Allison	G	Maine
Brian Mueller	D	Clarkson
Chris Imes	D	Maine
Mike Grier	F	Boston University
Greg Bullock	F	UMass Lowell
Martin St. Louis	F	Vermont
West
Player	Pos	Team
Chuck Thuss	G	Miami
Kelly Perrault	D	Bowling Green
Brian Rafalski	D	Wisconsin
Brian Holzinger	F	Bowling Green
Brendan Morrison	F	Michigan
Brian Bonin	F	Minnesota

1995–96
East
Player	Pos	Team
Tim Thomas	G	Vermont
Jeff Tory	D	Maine
Dan McGillis	D	Northeastern
Jay Pandolfo	F	Boston University
Éric Perrin	F	Vermont
Martin St. Louis	F	Vermont
West
Player	Pos	Team
Ryan Bach	G	Colorado College
Keith Aldridge	D	Lake Superior State
Mike Crowley	D	Minnesota
Peter Geronazzo	F	Colorado College
Brendan Morrison	F	Michigan
Brian Bonin	F	Minnesota

1996–97
East
Player	Pos	Team
Trevor Koenig	G	Union
Jon Coleman	D	Boston University
Matt Pagnutti	D	Clarkson
Chris Drury	F	Boston University
Todd White	F	Clarkson
Martin St. Louis	F	Vermont
West
Player	Pos	Team
Marty Turco	G	Michigan
Dan Boyle	D	Miami
Mike Crowley	D	Minnesota
Randy Robitaille	F	Miami
Brendan Morrison	F	Michigan
John Madden	F	Michigan

1997–98
East
Player	Pos	Team
Marc Robitaille	G	Northeastern
Ray Giroux	D	Yale
Tom Poti	D	Boston University
Chris Drury	F	Boston University
Mark Mowers	F	New Hampshire
Marty Reasoner	F	Boston College
West
Player	Pos	Team
Chad Alban	G	Michigan State
Dan Boyle	D	Miami
Curtis Murphy	D	North Dakota
Hugo Boisvert	F	Ohio State
Bill Muckalt	F	Michigan
Mike York	F	Michigan State

1998–99
East
Player	Pos	Team
Eric Heffler	G	St. Lawrence
David Cullen	D	Maine
Mike Mottau	D	Boston College
Brian Gionta	F	Boston College
Steve Kariya	F	Maine
Jason Krog	F	New Hampshire
West
Player	Pos	Team
Joe Blackburn	G	Michigan State
Scott Swanson	D	Colorado College
Brad Williamson	D	North Dakota
Jason Blake	F	North Dakota
Brian Swanson	F	Colorado College
Mike York	F	Michigan State

==== 2000s ====
1999–00
East
Player	Pos	Team
Joel Laing	G	Rensselaer
Justin Harney	D	St. Lawrence
Mike Mottau	D	Boston College
Brian Gionta	F	Boston College
Andy McDonald	F	Colgate
Jeff Farkas	F	Boston College
West
Player	Pos	Team
Karl Goehring	G	North Dakota
Jeff Dessner	D	Wisconsin
Jeff Jillson	D	Michigan
Shawn Horcoff	F	Michigan State
Jeff Panzer	F	North Dakota
Steven Reinprecht	F	Wisconsin

2000–01
East
Player	Pos	Team
Ty Conklin	G	New Hampshire
Bobby Allen	D	Boston College
Kent Huskins	D	Clarkson
Erik Anderson	F	St. Lawrence
Brian Gionta	F	Boston College
Jeff Hamilton	F	Yale
West
Player	Pos	Team
Ryan Miller	G	Michigan State
Jordan Leopold	D	Minnesota
Travis Roche	D	North Dakota
Dany Heatley	F	Wisconsin
Andy Hilbert	F	Michigan
Jeff Panzer	F	North Dakota

2001–02
East
Player	Pos	Team
Matt Underhill	G	Cornell
Jim Fahey	D	Northeastern
Douglas Murray	D	Cornell
Marc Cavosie	F	Rensselaer
Darren Haydar	F	New Hampshire
Colin Hemingway	F	New Hampshire
West
Player	Pos	Team
Ryan Miller	G	Michigan State
Mike Komisarek	D	Michigan
Jordan Leopold	D	Minnesota
Mike Cammalleri	F	Michigan
Mark Hartigan	F	St. Cloud State
John Pohl	F	Minnesota

2002–03
East
Player	Pos	Team
David LeNeveu	G	Cornell
Freddy Meyer	D	Boston University
Douglas Murray	D	Cornell
Ben Eaves	F	Boston College
Chris Higgins	F	Yale
Dominic Moore	F	Harvard
West
Player	Pos	Team
Mike Brown	G	Ferris State
John-Michael Liles	D	Michigan State
Tom Preissing	D	Colorado College
Noah Clarke	F	Colorado College
Chris Kunitz	F	Ferris State
Peter Sejna	F	Colorado College

2003–04
East
Player	Pos	Team
Yann Danis	G	Brown
Andrew Alberts	D	Boston College
Thomas Pöck	D	Massachusetts
Steve Saviano	F	New Hampshire
Lee Stempniak	F	Dartmouth
Tony Voce	F	Boston College
West
Player	Pos	Team
Bernd Brückler	G	Wisconsin
Keith Ballard	D	Minnesota
Ryan Caldwell	D	Denver
Brandon Bochenski	F	North Dakota
Junior Lessard	F	Minnesota–Duluth
Zach Parise	F	North Dakota

2004–05
East
Player	Pos	Team
David McKee	G	Cornell
Andrew Alberts	D	Boston College
Noah Welch	D	Harvard
Sean Collins	F	New Hampshire
Patrick Eaves	F	Boston College
Jason Guerriero	F	Northeastern
West
Player	Pos	Team
Curtis McElhinney	G	Colorado College
Matt Carle	D	Denver
Mark Stuart	D	Colorado College
T. J. Hensick	F	Michigan
Marty Sertich	F	Colorado College
Brett Sterling	F	Colorado College

2005–06
East
Player	Pos	Team
Cory Schneider	G	Boston College
Peter Harrold	D	Boston College
Dan Spang	D	Boston University
Chris Collins	F	Boston College
Greg Moore	F	Maine
T. J. Trevelyan	F	St. Lawrence
West
Player	Pos	Team
Brian Elliott	G	Wisconsin
Matt Carle	D	Denver
Andy Greene	D	Miami
Scott Parse	F	Omaha
Ryan Potulny	F	Minnesota
Brett Sterling	F	Colorado College

2006–07
East
Player	Pos	Team
John Curry	G	Boston University
Drew Bagnall	D	St. Lawrence
Reid Cashman	D	Quinnipiac
Brian Boyle	F	Boston College
David Jones	F	Dartmouth
Michel Léveillé	F	Maine
West
Player	Pos	Team
David Brown	G	Notre Dame
Alex Goligoski	D	Minnesota
Jack Johnson	D	Michigan
Ryan Duncan	F	North Dakota
T. J. Hensick	F	Michigan
Jonathan Toews	F	North Dakota

2007–08
East
Player	Pos	Team
Kevin Regan	G	New Hampshire
Matt Gilroy	D	Boston University
Mike Moore	D	Princeton
Nathan Gerbe	F	Boston College
Lee Jubinville	F	Princeton
Mike Radja	F	New Hampshire
West
Player	Pos	Team
Richard Bachman	G	Colorado College
Tyler Eckford	D	Alaska
Jack Hillen	D	Colorado College
Ryan Jones	F	Miami
T. J. Oshie	F	North Dakota
Kevin Porter	F	Michigan

2008–09
East
Player	Pos	Team
Brad Thiessen	G	Northeastern
Matt Gilroy	D	Boston University
Zach Miskovic	D	St. Lawrence
David McIntyre	F	Colgate
Viktor Stålberg	F	Vermont
Colin Wilson	F	Boston University
West
Player	Pos	Team
Alex Stalock	G	Minnesota–Duluth
Ian Cole	D	Notre Dame
Jamie McBain	D	Wisconsin
Louie Caporusso	F	Michigan
Aaron Palushaj	F	Michigan
Ryan Stoa	F	Minnesota

==== 2010s ====
2009–10
East
Player	Pos	Team
Ben Scrivens	G	Cornell
Colby Cohen	D	Boston University
Brendon Nash	D	Cornell
Bobby Butler	F	New Hampshire
Gustav Nyquist	F	Maine
Chase Polacek	F	Rensselaer
West
Player	Pos	Team
Marc Cheverie	G	Denver
Brendan Smith	D	Wisconsin
Patrick Wiercioch	D	Denver
Blake Geoffrion	F	Wisconsin
Mark Olver	F	Northern Michigan
Rhett Rakhshani	F	Denver

2010–11
East
Player	Pos	Team
Keith Kinkaid	G	Union
Brian Dumoulin	D	Boston College
Blake Kessel	D	New Hampshire
Cam Atkinson	F	Boston College
Chase Polacek	F	Rensselaer
Paul Thompson	F	New Hampshire
West
Player	Pos	Team
Pat Nagle	G	Ferris State
Chay Genoway	D	North Dakota
Justin Schultz	D	Wisconsin
Jack Connolly	F	Minnesota–Duluth
Matt Frattin	F	North Dakota
Andy Miele	F	Miami

2011–12
East
Player	Pos	Team
Troy Grosenick	G	Union
Danny Biega	D	Harvard
Brian Dumoulin	D	Boston College
Spencer Abbott	F	Maine
Alex Killorn	F	Harvard
Austin Smith	F	Colgate
West
Player	Pos	Team
Taylor Nelson	G	Ferris State
Torey Krug	D	Michigan State
Justin Schultz	D	Wisconsin
Jack Connolly	F	Minnesota–Duluth
Jaden Schwartz	F	Colorado College
Reilly Smith	F	Miami

2012–13
East
Player	Pos	Team
Eric Hartzell	G	Quinnipiac
Nick Bailen	D	Rensselaer
Chad Ruhwedel	D	UMass Lowell
Trevor van Riemsdyk	D	New Hampshire
Kyle Flanagan	F	St. Lawrence
Johnny Gaudreau	F	Boston College
Steven Whitney	F	Boston College
West
Player	Pos	Team
Brady Hjelle	G	Ohio State
Nick Jensen	D	St. Cloud State
Jacob Trouba	D	Michigan
Austin Czarnik	F	Miami
Danny Kristo	F	North Dakota
Drew LeBlanc	F	St. Cloud State

2013–14
East
Player	Pos	Team
Connor Hellebuyck	G	UMass Lowell
Mathew Bodie	D	Union
Shayne Gostisbehere	D	Union
Greg Carey	F	St. Lawrence
Johnny Gaudreau	F	Boston College
Kevin Hayes	F	Boston College
West
Player	Pos	Team
Sam Brittain	G	Denver
Jake McCabe	D	Wisconsin
Mike Reilly	D	Minnesota
Josh Archibald	F	Omaha
Nic Dowd	F	St. Cloud State
Ryan Dzingel	F	Ohio State

2014–15
East
Player	Pos	Team
Alex Lyon	G	Yale
Matt Grzelcyk	D	Boston University
Rob O'Gara	D	Yale
Daniel Ciampini	F	Union
Jack Eichel	F	Boston University
Jimmy Vesey	F	Harvard
West
Player	Pos	Team
Jake Hildebrand	G	Michigan State
Joey LaLeggia	D	Denver
Mike Reilly	D	Minnesota
Zach Hyman	F	Michigan
Tanner Kero	F	Michigan Tech
Matt Leitner	F	Minnesota State

2015–16
East
Player	Pos	Team
Alex Lyon	G	Yale
Matt Grzelcyk	D	Boston University
Jake Walman	D	Providence
Sam Anas	F	Quinnipiac
Andrew Poturalski	F	New Hampshire
Jimmy Vesey	F	Harvard
West
Player	Pos	Team
Charlie Lindgren	G	St. Cloud State
Ethan Prow	D	St. Cloud State
Zach Werenski	D	Michigan
Brock Boeser	F	North Dakota
Kyle Connor	F	Michigan
Tyler Motte	F	Michigan

2016–17
East
Player	Pos	Team
Charles Williams	G	Canisius
Adam Fox	D	Harvard
Charlie McAvoy	D	Boston University
Zach Aston-Reese	F	Northeastern
Spencer Foo	F	Union
Mike Vecchione	F	Union
West
Player	Pos	Team
Michael Bitzer	G	Bemidji State
Will Butcher	D	Denver
Tucker Poolman	D	North Dakota
Henrik Borgström	F	Denver
Alex Iafallo	F	Minnesota–Duluth
Tyler Sheehy	F	Minnesota

2017–18
East
Player	Pos	Team
Matthew Galajda	G	Cornell
Jérémy Davies	D	Northeastern
Adam Fox	D	Harvard
Ryan Donato	F	Harvard
Adam Gaudette	F	Northeastern
Dylan Sikura	F	Northeastern
West
Player	Pos	Team
Cale Morris	G	Notre Dame
Scott Perunovich	D	Minnesota–Duluth
Jimmy Schuldt	D	St. Cloud State
Henrik Borgström	F	Denver
C. J. Suess	F	Minnesota State
Troy Terry	F	Denver

2018–19
East
Player	Pos	Team
Cayden Primeau	G	Northeastern
Cale Makar	D	Massachusetts
Adam Fox	D	Harvard
Mitchell Chaffee	F	Massachusetts
Ryan Kuffner	F	Princeton
Nico Sturm	F	Clarkson
West
Player	Pos	Team
Hunter Shepard	G	Minnesota-Duluth
Quinn Hughes	D	Michigan
Jimmy Schuldt	D	St. Cloud State
Taro Hirose	F	Michigan State
Patrick Newell	F	St. Cloud State
Rem Pitlick	F	Minnesota

==== 2020s ====
2019–20
East
Player	Pos	Team
Jeremy Swayman	G	Maine
David Farrance	D	Boston University
Jack Rathbone	D	Harvard
Morgan Barron	F	Cornell
Jack Dugan	F	Providence
John Leonard	F	Massachusetts
West
Player	Pos	Team
Dryden McKay	G	Minnesota State
Ian Mitchell	D	Denver
Scott Perunovich	D	Minnesota–Duluth
Jordan Kawaguchi	F	North Dakota
Hugh McGing	F	Western Michigan
Marc Michaelis	F	Minnesota State

2020–21
East
Player	Pos	Team
Spencer Knight	G	Boston College
David Farrance	D	Boston University
Brennan Kapcheck	D	American International
Matthew Boldy	F	Boston College
Bobby Trivigno	F	Massachusetts
Odeen Tufto	F	Quinnipiac
West
Player	Pos	Team
Jack LaFontaine	G	Minnesota
Ronnie Attard	D	Western Michigan
Cam York	D	Michigan
Cole Caufield	F	Wisconsin
Shane Pinto	F	North Dakota
Sampo Ranta	F	Minnesota

2021–22
East
Player	Pos	Team
Devon Levi	G	Northeastern
Zach Metsa	D	Quinnipiac
Scott Morrow	D	Massachusetts
Nick Abruzzese	F	Harvard
Aidan McDonough	F	Northeastern
Bobby Trivigno	F	Massachusetts
West
Player	Pos	Team
Dryden McKay	G	Minnesota State
Ronnie Attard	D	Western Michigan
Jake Sanderson	D	North Dakota
Matty Beniers	F	Michigan
Bobby Brink	F	Denver
Nathan Smith	F	Minnesota State

2022–23
East
Player	Pos	Team
Devon Levi	G	Northeastern
Lane Hutson	D	Boston University
Henry Thrun	D	Harvard
Sean Farrell	F	Harvard
Collin Graf	F	Quinnipiac
Aidan McDonough	F	Northeastern
West
Player	Pos	Team
Blake Pietila	G	Michigan Tech
Brock Faber	D	Minnesota
Luke Hughes	D	Michigan
Logan Cooley	F	Minnesota
Adam Fantilli	F	Michigan
Matthew Knies	F	Minnesota

2023–24
East
Player	Pos	Team
Jacob Fowler	G	Boston College
Lane Hutson	D	Boston University
Ryan Ufko	D	Massachusetts
Macklin Celebrini	F	Boston University
Cutter Gauthier	F	Boston College
Will Smith	F	Boston College
West
Player	Pos	Team
Kaidan Mbereko	G	Colorado College
Zeev Buium	D	Denver
Seamus Casey	D	Michigan
Jackson Blake	F	North Dakota
Gavin Brindley	F	Michigan
Jack Devine	F	Denver

2024–25
East
Player	Pos	Team
Jacob Fowler	G	Boston College
Mac Gadowsky	D	Army
Cole Hutson	D	Boston University
Ryan Leonard	F	Boston College
Ayrton Martino	F	Clarkson
Cole O'Hara	F	Massachusetts
West
Player	Pos	Team
Trey Augustine	G	Michigan State
Zeev Buium	D	Denver
Sam Rinzel	D	Minnesota
Alex Bump	F	Western Michigan
Jack Devine	F	Denver
Isaac Howard	F	Michigan State

2025–26
East
Player	Pos	Team
Michael Hrabal	G	Massachusetts
Brandon Holt	D	Maine
Cole Hutson	D	Boston University
James Hagens	F	Boston College
Hayden Stavroff	F	Dartmouth
Ethan Wyttenbach	F	Quinnipiac
West
Player	Pos	Team
Trey Augustine	G	Michigan State
Jake Livanavage	D	North Dakota
Eric Pohlkamp	D	Denver
T. J. Hughes	F	Michigan
Porter Martone	F	Michigan State
Max Plante	F	Minnesota Duluth

==== First Team players by school ====
School (table 1)	Winners
Boston University	63
Boston College	61
Michigan	59
North Dakota	57
Colorado College	47
Minnesota	47
Denver	46
Michigan State	42
Harvard	37
Cornell	35
Clarkson	33
Wisconsin	33
Michigan Tech	31
Minnesota–Duluth	27
New Hampshire	25
Northeastern	24
Maine	23
St. Lawrence	23
Rensselaer	20
Bowling Green	15
Dartmouth	13
Vermont	12
Brown	11
Yale	11

School (table 2)	Winners
Massachusetts	10
Notre Dame	10
Providence	10
Miami	9
Union	9
Colgate	8
Lake Superior State	8
St. Cloud State	8
Quinnipiac	7
Western Michigan	7
Middlebury	6
Minnesota State	
Ferris State	5
Northern Michigan	5
Princeton	5
Ohio State	4
UMass Lowell	4
California	3
Colby	2
Omaha	2
Alaska	1
American International	1
Bemidji State	1
Canisius	1

==== Multiple appearances ====
Player	First Team appearances
Joe Cavanagh	3
Ken Dryden	3
Mike Eaves	3
Tony Esposito	3
Adam Fox	3
Mark Fusco	3
Brian Gionta	3
Phil Latreille	3
Rick Meagher	3
Brendan Morrison	3
Martin St. Louis	3
many players tied with	2

=== Second Team ===
==== 1940s ====
1947–48
Player	Pos	Team
Bernie Burke	G	Boston College
Connie Hill	D	Michigan
George Pulliam	D	Dartmouth
Jim Bell	F	Northeastern
Roland DePaul	F	Minnesota
Wally Gacek	F	Michigan

==== 1950s ====
1949–50
Player	Pos	Team
Jack McDonald	G	Michigan
Joe McCusker	D	Boston College
Daniel McKinnon	D	North Dakota
Len Ceglarski	F	Boston College
Buzz Johnson	F	North Dakota
Chris Ray	F	Colorado College

1951–52
Player	Pos	Team
Ken Kinsley	G	Colorado College
Joe deBastiani	D	Michigan Tech
Jim Haas	D	Michigan
Omer Brandt	F	Colorado College
Frank Chiarelli	F	Rensselaer
John Mayasich	F	Minnesota

1953–54
Player	Pos	Team
Bill Sloan	G	St. Lawrence
Doug Binning	D	Middlebury
Jim Haas	D	Michigan
Frank Chiarelli	F	Rensselaer
Wally Kilrea Jr.	F	Yale
Abbie Moore	F	Rensselaer

1954–55
Player	Pos	Team
Lorne Howes	G	Michigan
Phil Hilton	D	Colorado College
Bob Schiller	D	Michigan
John Mayasich	F	Minnesota
Bill MacFarland	F	Michigan
Jack McManus	F	Michigan Tech

1955–56
Player	Pos	Team
Bill Sloan	G	St. Lawrence
Chuck Lundberg	D	St. Lawrence
Art Smith	D	Clarkson
Jack McManus	F	Michigan Tech
Ken Yackel	F	Minnesota
Ed Zifcak	F	St. Lawrence

1956–57
Player	Pos	Team
Eddie MacDonald	G	Clarkson
John Petroske	D	Minnesota
Bill Steenson	D	North Dakota
Bob Cleary	F	Harvard
Joe McLean	F	St. Lawrence
Bob McCusker	F	Colorado College

==== 1980s ====
1983–84
East
Player	Pos	Team
Daren Puppa	G	Rensselaer
Peter Taglianetti	D	Providence
T. J. Connolly	D	Boston University
Kevin Foster	F	Vermont
Ken Manchurek	F	Northeastern
Gaetano Orlando	F	Providence
West
Player	Pos	Team
Rick Kosti	G	Minnesota–Duluth
Dan McFall	D	Michigan State
Bill Schafhauser	D	Northern Michigan
Perry Pooley	F	Ohio State
Dan Dorion	F	Western Michigan
Bob Lakso	F	Minnesota–Duluth

1984–85
East
Player	Pos	Team
Jeff Cooper	G	Colgate
Jim Averill	D	Northeastern
Peter Taglianetti	D	Providence
Doug Brown	F	Boston College
John Carter	F	Rensselaer
Bob Sweeney	F	Boston College
West
Player	Pos	Team
Glenn Healy	G	Western Michigan
Gary Haight	D	Michigan State
Tim Thomas	D	Wisconsin
Tony Granato	F	Wisconsin
Steve Moria	F	Alaska-Fairbanks
Ray Staszak	F	Illinois-Chicago

1985–86
East
Player	Pos	Team
Grant Blair	G	Harvard
Chris Terreri	G	Providence
Mark Benning	D	Harvard
Jay Octeau	D	Boston University
Andy Otto	D	Clarkson
Doug Brown	F	Boston College
John Cullen	F	Boston University
Clark Donatelli	F	Boston University
Randy Wood	F	Yale
West
Player	Pos	Team
Bill Horn	G	Western Michigan
Chris Olson	G	Denver
Donald McSween	D	Michigan State
Scott Sandelin	D	North Dakota
Jim Smith	D	Denver
Matt Christensen	F	Minnesota–Duluth
Dwight Mathiasen	F	Denver
Corey Millen	F	Minnesota
Jamie Wansbrough	F	Bowling Green

1986–87
East
Player	Pos	Team
Scott Yearwood	G	St. Lawrence
Hank Lammens	D	Harvard
Eric Weinrich	D	Maine
Pete Lappin	F	St. Lawrence
Jon Morris	F	UMass Lowell
Kevin Stevens	F	Boston College
West
Player	Pos	Team
Ed Belfour	G	North Dakota
Rob Doyle	D	Colorado College
Donald McSween	D	Michigan State
Gary Emmons	F	Northern Michigan
Tony Granato	F	Wisconsin
Brad Jones	F	Michigan

1987–88
East
Player	Pos	Team
John Fletcher	G	Clarkson
Brian Dowd	D	Northeastern
Don Sweeney	D	Harvard
Luciano Borsato	F	Clarkson
Gord Cruickshank	F	Providence
Mike Golden	F	Maine
Mike McHugh	F	Maine
West
Player	Pos	Team
Dean Anderson	G	Wisconsin
Mike DeAngelis	D	Minnesota–Duluth
Randy Skarda	D	Minnesota
Phil Berger	F	Northern Michigan
Nelson Emerson	F	Bowling Green
Steve Tuttle	F	Wisconsin

1988–89
East
Player	Pos	Team
David Littman	G	Boston College
Bob Beers	D	Maine
Dave Williams	D	Dartmouth
Rick Bennett	F	Providence
Tim Sweeney	F	Boston College
C. J. Young	F	Harvard
West
Player	Pos	Team
Curtis Joseph	G	Wisconsin
Darryl Olsen	D	Northern Michigan
Todd Richards	D	Minnesota
Sheldon Gorski	F	Illinois-Chicago
Daryn McBride	F	Denver
Dave Snuggerud	F	Minnesota

==== 1990s ====
1989–90
East
Player	Pos	Team
Chris Harvey	G	Brown
Keith Carney	D	Maine
Dan Ratushny	D	Cornell
Joel Gardner	F	Colgate
Jean-Yves Roy	F	Maine
C. J. Young	F	Harvard
West
Player	Pos	Team
Jason Muzzatti	G	Michigan State
Kord Cernich	D	Lake Superior State
Kip Noble	D	Michigan Tech
Lee Davidson	F	North Dakota
Jim Dowd	F	Lake Superior State
Dave Shields	F	Denver

1990–91
East
Player	Pos	Team
Jeff Levy	G	New Hampshire
Peter Ahola	D	Boston University
Ted Crowley	D	Boston College
Peter Ciavaglia	F	Harvard
Joé Juneau	F	Rensselaer
Jim Montgomery	F	Maine
West
Player	Pos	Team
Bill Pye	G	Northern Michigan
Sean Hill	D	Wisconsin
Karl Johnston	D	Lake Superior State
Denny Felsner	F	Michigan
David Roberts	F	Michigan
Doug Weight	F	Lake Superior State

1991–92
East
Player	Pos	Team
Scott LaGrand	G	Boston College
Christian Soucy	G	Vermont
Tom Dion	D	Boston University
Rob Gaudreau	D	Providence
Domenic Amodeo	F	New Hampshire
Dale Band	F	Colgate
Mike Lappin	F	St. Lawrence
West
Player	Pos	Team
Duane Derksen	G	Wisconsin
Chris Hynnes	D	Colorado College
Doug Zmolek	D	Michigan State
Jim Hiller	F	Northern Michigan
Greg Johnson	F	North Dakota
Larry Olimb	F	Minnesota

1992–93
East
Player	Pos	Team
Neil Little	G	Rensselaer
Aaron Miller	D	Vermont
Kaj Linna	D	Boston University
Cal Ingraham	F	Maine
Jim Montgomery	F	Maine
Mark Kaufmann	F	Yale
West
Player	Pos	Team
Steve Shields	G	Michigan
Bob Marshall	D	Miami
Michael Smith	D	Lake Superior State
Fred Knipscheer	F	St. Cloud State
Brian Savage	F	Miami
Brian Rolston	F	Lake Superior State

1993–94
East
Player	Pos	Team
J. P. McKersie	G	Boston University
Rich Brennan	D	Boston University
Derek Maguire	D	Harvard
Jacques Joubert	F	Boston University
Shane Henry	F	UMass Lowell
Chad Quenneville	F	Providence
West
Player	Pos	Team
Steve Shields	G	Michigan
Jeff Wells	D	Bowling Green
Chris McAlpine	D	Minnesota
Dean Fedorchuk	F	Alaska-Fairbanks
Clayton Beddoes	F	Lake Superior State
Steve Guolla	F	Michigan State

1994–95
East
Player	Pos	Team
Tim Thomas	G	Vermont
Kaj Linna	D	Boston University
Jeff Tory	D	Maine
Chris O'Sullivan	F	Boston University
Marko Tuomainen	F	Clarkson
Chad Quenneville	F	Providence
West
Player	Pos	Team
Ryan Bach	G	Colorado College
Kent Fearns	D	Colorado College
Keith Aldridge	D	Lake Superior State
Jay McNeill	F	Colorado College
Mike Knuble	F	Michigan
Anson Carter	F	Michigan State

1995–96
East
Player	Pos	Team
Dan Murphy	G	Clarkson
Jon Coleman	D	Boston University
Brad Dexter	D	Colgate
Chris Drury	F	Boston University
Todd White	F	Clarkson
Burke Murphy	F	St. Lawrence
West
Player	Pos	Team
Marc Magliarditi	G	Western Michigan
Andy Roach	D	Ferris State
Dan Trebil	D	Minnesota
Sean Tallaire	F	Lake Superior State
Kevin Hilton	F	Michigan
Teeder Wynne	F	North Dakota

1996–97
East
Player	Pos	Team
Dan Murphy	G	Clarkson
Chris Kelleher	D	Boston University
Tim Murray	D	New Hampshire
Mike Harder	F	Colgate
Eric Healey	F	Rensselaer
Jason Krog	F	New Hampshire
West
Player	Pos	Team
Kirk Daubenspeck	G	Wisconsin
Andy Roach	D	Ferris State
Curtis Murphy	D	North Dakota
Jason Botterill	F	Michigan
David Hoogsteen	F	North Dakota
Mark Parrish	F	St. Cloud State

1997–98
East
Player	Pos	Team
Alex Westlund	G	Yale
Chris Kelleher	D	Boston University
Mike Mottau	D	Boston College
Steve Shirreffs	D	Princeton
Brian Gionta	F	Boston College
Jeff Hamilton	F	Yale
Eric Healey	F	Rensselaer
West
Player	Pos	Team
Karl Goehring	G	North Dakota
Calvin Elfring	D	Colorado College
Tyler Harlton	D	Michigan State
Sean Berens	F	Michigan State
Jason Blake	F	North Dakota
Brian Swanson	F	Colorado College

1998–99
East
Player	Pos	Team
Michel Larocque	G	Boston University
Jayme Filipowicz	D	New Hampshire
Willie Mitchell	D	Clarkson
Erik Cole	F	Clarkson
Jeff Hamilton	F	Yale
Rejean Stringer	F	Merrimack
West
Player	Pos	Team
Jeff Maund	G	Ohio State
Benoit Cotnoir	D	Notre Dame
Mike Weaver	D	Michigan State
Hugo Boisvert	F	Ohio State
Paul Comrie	F	Denver
Jay Panzer	F	North Dakota

==== 2000s ====
1999–00
East
Player	Pos	Team
Ty Conklin	G	New Hampshire
Chris Dyment	D	Boston University
Brian Pothier	D	Rensselaer
Brandon Dietrich	F	St. Lawrence
Cory Larose	F	Maine
Brad Tapper	F	Rensselaer
West
Player	Pos	Team
Jayme Platt	G	Lake Superior State
Mike Pudlick	D	St. Cloud State
Mike Weaver	D	Michigan State
Mike Comrie	F	Michigan
Lee Goren	F	North Dakota
Dany Heatley	F	Wisconsin

2000–01
East
Player	Pos	Team
Nolan Schaefer	G	Providence
Matt Desrosiers	D	St. Lawrence
Ron Hainsey	D	UMass Lowell
Carl Corazzini	F	Boston University
Krys Kolanos	F	Boston College
Devin Rask	F	Providence
West
Player	Pos	Team
Scott Meyer	G	St. Cloud State
Jeff Jillson	D	Michigan
Greg Zanon	D	Omaha
Mike Bishai	F	Western Michigan
Mike Cammalleri	F	Michigan
Mark Cullen	F	Colorado College
Bryan Lundbohm	F	North Dakota

2001–02
East
Player	Pos	Team
Yann Danis	G	Brown
Chris Dyment	D	Boston University
Peter Metcalf	D	Maine
Niko Dimitrakos	F	Maine
Ben Eaves	F	Boston College
Matt Murley	F	Rensselaer
West
Player	Pos	Team
Wade Dubielewicz	G	Denver
Andrew Hutchinson	D	Michigan State
John-Michael Liles	D	Michigan State
Greg Zanon	D	Omaha
Rob Collins	F	Ferris State
Mark Cullen	F	Colorado College
Jeff Hoggan	F	Omaha

2002–03
East
Player	Pos	Team
Mike Ayers	G	New Hampshire
J. D. Forrest	D	Boston College
Noah Welch	D	Harvard
Stephen Baby	F	Cornell
Lanny Gare	F	New Hampshire
Colin Hemingway	F	New Hampshire
West
Player	Pos	Team
Curtis McElhinney	G	Colorado College
Brad Fast	D	Michigan State
Paul Martin	D	Minnesota
Shane Joseph	F	Minnesota State
Grant Stevenson	F	Minnesota State
R. J. Umberger	F	Ohio State

2003–04
East
Player	Pos	Team
Jimmy Howard	G	Maine
Prestin Ryan	D	Maine
Stephen Wood	D	Providence
Patrick Eaves	F	Boston College
Todd Jackson	F	Maine
Ryan Shannon	F	Boston College
Colin Shields	F	Maine
West
Player	Pos	Team
Al Montoya	G	Michigan
Beau Geisler	D	Minnesota–Duluth
A. J. Thelen	D	Michigan State
Derek Edwardson	F	Miami
Jim Slater	F	Michigan State
Thomas Vanek	F	Minnesota

2004–05
East
Player	Pos	Team
Dov Grumet-Morris	G	Harvard
Charlie Cook	D	Cornell
Brian Yandle	D	New Hampshire
Matt Moulson	F	Cornell
Ryan Shannon	F	Boston College
Lee Stempniak	F	Dartmouth
West
Player	Pos	Team
Tuomas Tarkki	G	Northern Michigan
Andy Greene	D	Miami
Brett Skinner	D	Denver
Gabe Gauthier	F	Colorado College
Colin Murphy	F	Michigan Tech
Jeff Tambellini	F	Michigan

2005–06
East
Player	Pos	Team
John Curry	G	Boston University
Reid Cashman	D	Quinnipiac
Brian Yandle	D	New Hampshire
Brian Boyle	F	Boston College
Michel Léveillé	F	Maine
Mike Ouellette	F	Dartmouth
West
Player	Pos	Team
Bobby Goepfert	G	St. Cloud State
Tom Gilbert	D	Wisconsin
Nathan Oystrick	D	Northern Michigan
David Backes	F	Minnesota State
Joe Pavelski	F	Wisconsin
Paul Stastny	F	Denver

2006–07
East
Player	Pos	Team
Jonathan Quick	G	Massachusetts
Matt Gilroy	D	Boston University
Sean Sullivan	D	Boston University
Nick Dodge	F	Clarkson
Eric Ehn	F	Air Force
Trevor Smith	F	New Hampshire
West
Player	Pos	Team
Bobby Goepfert	G	St. Cloud State
Taylor Chorney	D	North Dakota
Matt Hunwick	D	Michigan
Nathan Davis	F	Miami
Scott Parse	F	Omaha
Mike Santorelli	F	Northern Michigan

2007–08
East
Player	Pos	Team
Josh Kassel	G	Army
Grant Clitsome	D	Clarkson
Brad Flaishans	D	New Hampshire
Bryan Ewing	F	Boston University
Matt Fornataro	F	New Hampshire
Pete MacArthur	F	Boston University
West
Player	Pos	Team
Jeff Lerg	G	Michigan State
Chris Butler	D	Denver
Alec Martinez	D	Miami
Chad Kolarik	F	Michigan
Ryan Lasch	F	St. Cloud State
Chad Rau	F	Colorado College

2008–09
East
Player	Pos	Team
Zane Kalemba	G	Princeton
Maury Edwards	D	UMass Lowell
Kevin Shattenkirk	D	Boston University
Mark Arcobello	F	Yale
Jacques Lamoureux	F	Air Force
James Marcou	F	Massachusetts
West
Player	Pos	Team
Chad Johnson	G	Alaska
Chay Genoway	D	North Dakota
Erik Gustafsson	D	Northern Michigan
Carter Camper	F	Miami
Erik Condra	F	Notre Dame
Chad Rau	F	Colorado College

==== 2010s ====
2009–10
East
Player	Pos	Team
Brian Foster	G	New Hampshire
Justin Braun	D	Massachusetts
Blake Kessel	D	New Hampshire
Sean Backman	F	Yale
Nick Johnson	F	Sacred Heart
Broc Little	F	Yale
West
Player	Pos	Team
Cody Reichard	G	Miami
Erik Gustafsson	D	Northern Michigan
Jeff Petry	D	Michigan State
Jack Connolly	F	Minnesota–Duluth
Zac Dalpe	F	Ohio State
Matt Read	F	Bemidji State

2010–11
East
Player	Pos	Team
John Muse	G	Boston College
Nick Bailen	D	Rensselaer
Taylor Fedun	D	Princeton
Stéphane Da Costa	F	Merrimack
Gustav Nyquist	F	Maine
Paul Zanette	F	Niagara
West
Player	Pos	Team
Aaron Dell	G	North Dakota
Jake Gardiner	D	Wisconsin
Zach Redmond	D	Ferris State
Carter Camper	F	Miami
Mike Connolly	F	Minnesota–Duluth
Carl Hagelin	F	Michigan

2011–12
East
Player	Pos	Team
Joe Cannata	G	Merrimack
Mathew Bodie	D	Union
Tim Kirby	D	Air Force
Barry Almeida	F	Boston College
Brian O'Neill	F	Yale
Jeremy Welsh	F	Union
West
Player	Pos	Team
Kent Patterson	G	Minnesota
Chad Billins	D	Ferris State
Danny DeKeyser	D	Western Michigan
Nick Bjugstad	F	Minnesota
J. T. Brown	F	Minnesota–Duluth
Jason Zucker	F	Denver

2012–13
East
Player	Pos	Team
Jon Gillies	G	Providence
Shayne Gostisbehere	D	Union
George Hughes	D	St. Lawrence
Greg Carey	F	St. Lawrence
Mike Collins	F	Merrimack
Andrew Miller	F	Yale
West
Player	Pos	Team
Juho Olkinuora	G	Denver
Danny DeKeyser	D	Western Michigan
Nate Schmidt	D	Minnesota
Corban Knight	F	North Dakota
Anders Lee	F	Notre Dame
Ryan Walters	F	Omaha

2013–14
East
Player	Pos	Team
Colin Stevens	G	Union
Ben Hutton	D	Maine
Mike Matheson	D	Boston College
Daniel Carr	F	Union
Ryan Haggerty	F	Rensselaer
Devin Shore	F	Maine
West
Player	Pos	Team
Adam Wilcox	G	Minnesota
Joey LaLeggia	D	Denver
Colton Parayko	D	Alaska
Austin Czarnik	F	Miami
Cody Kunyk	F	Alaska
Michael Mersch	F	Wisconsin
Kyle Rau	F	Minnesota

2014–15
East
Player	Pos	Team
Jon Gillies	G	Providence
Mike Paliotta	D	Vermont
Robbie Russo	D	Notre Dame
Sam Anas	F	Quinnipiac
Matt Garbowsky	F	RIT
Kevin Roy	F	Northeastern
West
Player	Pos	Team
Zane McIntyre	G	North Dakota
Zach Palmquist	D	Minnesota State
Colton Parayko	D	Alaska
Austin Czarnik	F	Miami
Dylan Larkin	F	Michigan
Michael Mersch	F	Wisconsin
Trevor Moore	F	Denver

2015–16
East
Player	Pos	Team
Thatcher Demko	G	Boston College
Gavin Bayreuther	D	St. Lawrence
Rob O'Gara	D	Yale
Ryan Fitzgerald	F	Boston College
Mark Jankowski	F	Providence
Danny O'Regan	F	Boston University
West
Player	Pos	Team
Cam Johnson	G	North Dakota
Will Butcher	D	Denver
Troy Stecher	D	North Dakota
Drake Caggiula	F	North Dakota
J. T. Compher	F	Michigan
Alex Petan	F	Michigan Tech

2016–17
East
Player	Pos	Team
Kyle Hayton	G	St. Lawrence
Gavin Bayreuther	D	St. Lawrence
Jake Walman	D	Providence
Dylan Zink	D	UMass Lowell
Anders Bjork	F	Notre Dame
Tyler Kelleher	F	New Hampshire
Alexander Kerfoot	F	Harvard
West
Player	Pos	Team
Tanner Jaillet	G	Denver
Daniel Brickley	D	Minnesota State
Luc Snuggerud	D	Omaha
Mason Jobst	F	Ohio State
Luke Kunin	F	Wisconsin
Austin Ortega	F	Omaha

2017–18
East
Player	Pos	Team
Colton Point	G	Colgate
Jacob Bryson	D	Providence
Kelly Summers	D	Clarkson
Ryan Kuffner	F	Princeton
Sheldon Rempal	F	Clarkson
Max Véronneau	F	Princeton
West
Player	Pos	Team
Tanner Jaillet	G	Denver
Philip Beaulieu	D	Northern Michigan
Alec Rauhauser	D	Bowling Green
Nick Halloran	F	Colorado College
Tanner Laczynski	F	Ohio State
Cooper Marody	F	Michigan

2018–19
East
Player	Pos	Team
Andrew Shortridge	G	Quinnipiac
Jérémy Davies	D	Northeastern
Joseph Duszak	D	Mercyhurst
Blake Christensen	F	American International
David Cotton	F	Boston College
Josh Wilkins	F	Providence
West
Player	Pos	Team
Joey Daccord	G	Arizona State
Jack Ahcan	D	St. Cloud State
Bobby Nardella	D	Notre Dame
Scott Perunovich	D	Minnesota-Duluth
Mason Jobst	F	Ohio State
Blake Lizotte	F	St. Cloud State
Troy Loggins	F	Northern Michigan

==== 2020s ====
2019–20
East
Player	Pos	Team
Frank Marotte	G	Clarkson
Yanni Kaldis	D	Cornell
Mike Lee	D	Sacred Heart
Nick Abruzzese	F	Harvard
Jason Cotton	F	Sacred Heart
Tyler Madden	F	Northeastern
West
Player	Pos	Team
Hunter Shepard	G	Minnesota–Duluth
Cole Hults	D	Penn State
Connor Mackey	D	Minnesota State
Alec Rauhauser	D	Bowling Green
Noah Cates	F	Minnesota–Duluth
Cole Koepke	F	Minnesota–Duluth
Nate Sucese	F	Penn State

2020–21
East
Player	Pos	Team
Trevin Kozlowski	G	Army
Drew Helleson	D	Boston College
Zac Jones	D	Massachusetts
Colin Bilek	F	Army
Will Calverley	F	RIT
Jonny Evans	F	Connecticut
West
Player	Pos	Team
Dryden McKay	G	Minnesota State
Matt Kiersted	D	North Dakota
Jackson LaCombe	D	Minnesota
Dylan Holloway	F	Wisconsin
Jordan Kawaguchi	F	North Dakota
Linus Weissbach	F	Wisconsin

2021–22
East
Player	Pos	Team
Yaniv Perets	G	Quinnipiac
Jordan Harris	D	Northeastern
Henry Thrun	D	Harvard
Colin Bilek	F	Army
Jack McBain	F	Boston College
Ryan Tverberg	F	Connecticut
West
Player	Pos	Team
Ryan Fanti	G	Minnesota Duluth
Luke Hughes	D	Michigan
Owen Power	D	Michigan
Ethen Frank	F	Western Michigan
Brian Halonen	F	Michigan Tech
Ben Meyers	F	Minnesota

2022–23
East
Player	Pos	Team
Yaniv Perets	G	Quinnipiac
Sam Malinski	D	Cornell
Zach Metsa	D	Quinnipiac
Matt Brown	F	Boston University
Matthew Coronato	F	Harvard
Alex Jefferies	F	Merrimack
West
Player	Pos	Team
Ryan Bischel	G	Notre Dame
Michael Benning	D	Denver
Jake Livingstone	D	Minnesota State
Carter Mazur	F	Denver
Jason Polin	F	Western Michigan
Massimo Rizzo	F	Denver

2023–24
East
Player	Pos	Team
Ian Shane	G	Cornell
Gianfranco Cassaro	D	RIT
John Prokop	D	Union
Collin Graf	F	Quinnipiac
Ryan Leonard	F	Boston College
Liam McLinskey	F	Holy Cross
Gabe Perreault	F	Boston College
West
Player	Pos	Team
Kyle McClellan	G	Wisconsin
Dylan Anhorn	D	St. Cloud State
Artyom Levshunov	D	Michigan State
Noah Laba	F	Colorado College
Rutger McGroarty	F	Michigan
Massimo Rizzo	F	Denver

2024–25
East
Player	Pos	Team
Albin Boija	G	Maine
Eamon Powell	F	Boston College
Trey Taylor	D	Clarkson
Liam McLinskey	F	Holy Cross
Joey Muldowney	F	Connecticut
Gabe Perreault	F	Boston College
West
Player	Pos	Team
Alex Tracy	G	Minnesota State
Matt Basgall	D	Michigan State
Jake Livanavage	D	North Dakota
Aiden Fink	F	Penn State
Artem Shlaine	F	Arizona State
Jimmy Snuggerud	F	Minnesota

2025–26
East
Player	Pos	Team
Lawton Zacher	G	Northeastern
Tyler Dunbar	D	Union
Chris Hedden	D	Air Force
Dylan Hryckowian	F	Northeastern
Jack Musa	F	Massachusetts
Felix Trudeau	F	Sacred Heart
West
Player	Pos	Team
Josh Kotai	G	Augustana
Ty Hanson	D	Minnesota Duluth
Evan Murr	D	Minnesota State
Tyson Gross	F	St. Cloud State
Gavin McKenna	F	Penn State
Charlie Stramel	F	Michigan State

==== Second Team players by school ====
School (table 1)	Winners
Boston College	32
Michigan	30
Boston University	28
North Dakota	26
Maine	23
Michigan State	22
Minnesota	22
Denver	21
Colorado College	20
Wisconsin	19
Providence	18
Clarkson	17
New Hampshire	16
St. Lawrence	16
Harvard	15
Minnesota Duluth	14
Rensselaer	14
Northern Michigan	13
Yale	12
Miami	11
St. Cloud State	11
Lake Superior State	10
Minnesota State	10
Western Michigan	9
Northeastern	8
Ohio State	8
Cornell	7
Michigan Tech	7
Notre Dame	7
Omaha	7
Quinnipiac	7

School (table 2)	Winners
Colgate	6
Union	6
Alaska	5
Army	5
Bowling Green	5
Ferris State	5
Princeton	5
Massachusetts	5
UMass Lowell	5
Merrimack	5
Vermont	5
Air Force	4
Dartmouth	4
Penn State	4
Sacred Heart	4
Connecticut	3
RIT	3
Arizona State	2
Brown	2
Holy Cross	2
Illinois-Chicago	2
Augustana	1
American International	1
Bemidji State	1
Mercyhurst	1
Middlebury	1
Niagara	1

==== Multiple appearances ====
Player	Second Team appearances
many players tied with	2
