= 1968–69 NCAA University Division men's ice hockey season =

- Duration: November 1968– March 15, 1969
- NCAA tournament: 1969
- National championship: Broadmoor World Arena; Colorado Springs, Colorado
- NCAA champion: Denver

The 1968–69 NCAA University Division men's ice hockey season began in November 1968 and concluded with the 1969 NCAA University Division Men's Ice Hockey Tournament's championship game on March 15, 1969, at the Broadmoor World Arena in Colorado Springs, Colorado. This was the 22nd season in which an NCAA ice hockey championship was held and is the 75th year overall where an NCAA school fielded a team.

Wisconsin was admitted into the WCHA beginning with this season. Because they now played each of the other three Big Ten teams they were included into the informal conference standings.

Air Force and Notre Dame both begin to sponsor their ice hockey programs. Both teams started as independents.

== Regular season ==
=== Season tournaments ===
Tournament	Dates	Teams	Champion
ECAC Christmas Hockey Tournament	December 20–21	4	Cornell
ECAC Holiday Hockey Festival	December 20–21	4	Clarkson
Great Lakes Invitational	December 20–21	4	Michigan Tech
St. Paul Hockey Classic	December 20–21	4	North Dakota
Big Ten Holiday Tournament	December 26–28	4	Michigan
Boston Arena Christmas Tournament	December 27–28	4	Boston University
Syracuse Invitational	December 27–28	4	Cornell
Yankee Conference Tournament	December 27–28	4	New Hampshire
Broadmoor World Tournament	December 27–29	3	Denver
Rensselaer Holiday Tournament	December 27–29	4	Waterloo
Centennial Tournament	January 3–4	4	Loyola
Beanpot	February 3, 10	4	Harvard

=== Standings ===
1968–69 Big Ten standings
	Conference							Overall					
	GP	W	L	T	Pct.	GF	GA	GP	W	L	T	GF	GA
Michigan†	12	7	5	0	.583	42	39	28	16	12	0	124	101
Michigan State	10	5	4	1	.550	25	18	28	11	16	1	91	123
Minnesota	10	4	5	1	.450	25	29	29	13	13	3	113	96
Wisconsin	8	3	5	0	.375	26	32	34	22	10	2	215	98
† indicates conference regular season champion

1968–69 ECAC Hockey standings
	Conference							Overall					
	GP	W	L	T	Pct.	GF	GA	GP	W	L	T	GF	GA
Cornell†*	20	19	1	0	.950	139	39	29	27	2	0	190	54
Boston College	21	16	5	0	.762	114	72	26	19	7	0	144	91
Harvard	23	16	6	1	.717	135	74	28	19	8	1	157	101
Clarkson	18	12	5	1	.694	94	65	28	19	7	2	158	96
New Hampshire	16	10	5	1	.656	68	56	29	22	6	1	155	77
Boston University	21	13	8	0	.619	107	69	29	19	10	1	154	84
Rensselaer	14	8	5	1	.607	58	54	21	12	8	1	93	77
Brown	20	10	9	1	.525	98	83	22	10	11	1	100	86
St. Lawrence	18	8	8	2	.500	83	76	24	11	11	2	102	96
Army	11	4	6	1	.409	45	48	28	20	7	1	167	104
Yale	23	9	14	0	.391	72	113	24	9	15	0	72	113
Colgate	16	6	10	0	.375	53	68	25	12	13	0	116	110
Dartmouth	21	6	13	2	.333	83	146	23	7	14	2	91	154
Providence	15	4	11	0	.267	43	76	21	7	14	0	67	95
Northeastern	18	4	14	0	.222	56	108	23	7	16	0	74	127
Princeton	23	5	18	0	.217	62	91	24	5	19	0	62	91
Pennsylvania	15	1	14	0	.067	44	116	22	7	15	0	79	131
Championship: Cornell † indicates conference regular season champion * indicates conference tournament champion

1968–69 Independent College Athletic Conference standings
	Conference							Overall					
	GP	W	L	T	PTS	GF	GA	GP	W	L	T	GF	GA
Rensselaer†	4	2	1	1	5	18	18	21	12	8	1	93	77
Clarkson	4	2	2	0	4	21	18	28	19	7	2	158	96
St. Lawrence	4	1	2	1	3	17	20	24	11	11	2	102	96
† indicates conference regular season champion

1968–69 NCAA University Division Independent ice hockey standings
	Conference							Overall					
	GP	W	L	T	PTS	GF	GA	GP	W	L	T	GF	GA
Air Force	0	0	0	0	-	-	-	18	6	12	0	85	100
Alaska–Fairbanks	0	0	0	0	-	-	-	9	3	6	0	-	-
Notre Dame	0	0	0	0	-	-	-	27	16	8	3	149	117
Ohio State	0	0	0	0	-	-	-	29	11	18	0	122	161

1968–69 Western Collegiate Hockey Association standings
	Conference							Overall					
	GP	W	L	T	PCT	GF	GA	GP	W	L	T	GF	GA
Michigan Tech†*	20	14	5	1	.725	86	56	32	21	9	2	144	95
Denver*	20	14	6	0	.700	94	50	32	26	6	0	160	71
North Dakota	22	15	7	0	.682	97	89	29	18	10	1	130	125
Michigan	18	10	8	0	.556	75	63	28	16	12	0	124	101
Minnesota	22	11	9	2	.545	74	60	29	13	13	3	113	96
Michigan State	18	7	10	1	.417	51	57	28	11	16	1	91	123
Colorado College	18	4	14	0	.222	47	94	28	12	16	0	105	121
Minnesota–Duluth	22	3	19	0	.136	64	119	29	6	23	0	91	147
Championship: Michigan Tech, Denver † indicates conference regular season champion * indicates conference tournament champion

== 1969 NCAA Tournament ==
Semifinals; March 13–14
W1	Denver	9
E2	Harvard	2
E1	Cornell	4*
W2	Michigan Tech	3

National championship March 15
W1	Denver	4
E1	Cornell	3
Third-place game
E2	Harvard	6**
W2	Michigan Tech	5

Note: * denotes overtime period(s)

== Player stats ==
=== Scoring leaders ===
The following players led the league in points at the conclusion of the season.

GP = Games played; G = Goals; A = Assists; Pts = Points; PIM = Penalty minutes

Player	Class	Team	GP	G	A	Pts	PIM
David Merhar	Senior	Army	28	57	50	107	-
Tony Curran	Senior	Army	-	25	55	80	-
Brian Cornell	Senior	Cornell	29	22	52	74	26
Joe Cavanagh	Sophomore	Harvard	28	24	38	62	-
Delbert Dehate	Junior	Wisconsin	34	36	25	61	50
Peter Tufford	Senior	Cornell	29	20	40	60	2
Tim Sheehy	Junior	Boston College	26	19	41	60	36
George Morrison	Sophomore	Denver	32	40	18	58	12
Tommy Earl	Junior	Colgate	-	37	20	57	-
David Conte	Junior	Colgate	-	-	-	56	-

=== Leading goaltenders ===
The following goaltenders led the league in goals against average at the end of the regular season while playing at least 33% of their team's total minutes.

GP = Games played; Min = Minutes played; W = Wins; L = Losses; OT = Overtime/shootout losses; GA = Goals against; SO = Shutouts; SV% = Save percentage; GAA = Goals against average

Player	Class	Team	GP	Min	W	L	OT	GA	SO	SV%	GAA
Ken Dryden	Senior	Cornell	27	1578	25	2	0	47	3	.936	1.79
John Barry	Sophomore	Notre Dame	–	-	-	-	-	-	-	-	2.00
Brian Reynolds	Sophomore	Providence	19	-	-	-	-	-	-	-	2.10
Gerry Powers	Senior	Denver	32	-	26	6	0	-	5	.915	2.23
Rick Duffett	Junior	Michigan State	16	-	-	-	-	42	-	.916	2.74
Wayne Thomas	Sophomore	Wisconsin	17	943	9	6	1	44	2	.901	2.80
Donald McGinnis	Junior	Brown	-	-	-	-	-	-	1	.919	2.83
Rick Metzer	Senior	New Hampshire	-	-	-	-	-	-	-	.896	2.84
Gord McRae	Junior	Michigan Tech	28	1680	-	-	-	84	1	.897	3.00
Bob Vroman	Junior	Wisconsin	18	948	13	4	1	49	3	.884	3.10

== Awards ==
=== NCAA ===
Award		Recipient
Spencer Penrose Award		Charlie Holt, New Hampshire
Most Outstanding Player in NCAA Tournament		Keith Magnuson, Denver
AHCA All-American Teams
East Team	Position	West Team
Ken Dryden, Cornell	G	Rick Duffett, Michigan State
Paul Hurley, Boston College	D	Keith Magnuson, Denver
Bruce Pattison, Cornell	D	John Marks, North Dakota
Joe Cavanagh, Harvard	F	Bob Collyard, Colorado College
Brian Cornell, Cornell	F	Al Karlander, Michigan Tech
Tim Sheehy, Boston College	F	George Morrison, Denver
Peter Tufford, Cornell	F	Bob Munro, North Dakota
Herb Wakabayashi, Boston University	F	

=== ECAC ===
Award		Recipient
Player of the Year		Ken Dryden, Cornell
Rookie of the Year		Joe Cavanagh, Harvard
Most Outstanding Player in Tournament		Ken Dryden, Cornell
All-ECAC Hockey Teams
First Team	Position	Second Team
Ken Dryden, Cornell	G	Rick Metzer, New Hampshire
Paul Hurley, Boston College	D	Curt Bennett, Brown
Bruce Pattison, Cornell	D	Chris Gurry, Harvard
Brian Cornell, Cornell	F	Mike Hyndman, Boston University
Joe Cavanagh, Harvard	F	Tim Sheehy, Boston College
Herb Wakabayashi, Boston University	F	Peter Tufford, Cornell

=== WCHA ===
Award		Recipient
Most Valuable Player		Murray McLachlan, Minnesota
Sophomore of the Year		George Morrison, Denver
Coach of the Year		John Matchefts, Colorado College
All-WCHA Teams
First Team	Position	Second Team
Murray McLachlan, Minnesota	G	Gerry Powers, Denver
Keith Magnuson, Denver	D	Paul Domm, Michigan
Terry Abram, North Dakota	D	John Marks, North Dakota
George Morrison, Denver	F	Dave Kartio, North Dakota
Bob Munro, North Dakota	F	Tom Miller, Denver
Al Karlander, Michigan Tech	F	Bob Collyard, Colorado College

== 1969 NHL Amateur Draft ==
Round	Pick	Player	College	Conference	NHL team
3	30	Bernie Gagnon	Michigan	WCHA	St. Louis Blues
5	57	Wally Olds	Minnesota	WCHA	Detroit Red Wings
5	60	Mike Baumgartner	North Dakota	WCHA	Chicago Black Hawks
6	68	Lynn Powis	Denver	WCHA	Montreal Canadiens
6	70	Dale Yutsyk	Colorado College	WCHA	St. Louis Blues
6	71	Dave Hudson	North Dakota	WCHA	Chicago Black Hawks
7	73	Bob Collyard	Colorado College	WCHA	St. Louis Blues

== See also ==
- 1968–69 NCAA College Division men's ice hockey season
