= 1967–68 NCAA University Division men's ice hockey season =

- Duration: November 1967– March 16, 1968
- NCAA tournament: 1968
- National championship: Duluth Arena Auditorium; Duluth, Minnesota
- NCAA champion: Denver

The 1967–68 NCAA University Division men's ice hockey season began in November 1967 and concluded with the 1968 NCAA Division I Men's Ice Hockey Tournament's championship game on March 16, 1968, at the Duluth Arena Auditorium in Duluth, Minnesota. This was the 21st season in which an NCAA ice hockey championship was held and is the 74th year overall where an NCAA school fielded a team.

Pennsylvania joined ECAC Hockey beginning with this season.

== Regular season ==
=== Season tournaments ===
Tournament	Dates	Teams	Champion
New Brunswick Invitational	November 24–25	4	Boston University
ECAC Christmas Hockey Tournament	December 15–16	4	Princeton
Great Lakes Invitational	December 20–21	4	North Dakota
ECAC Holiday Hockey Festival	December 21–22	4	Cornell
Broadmoor World Tournament	December 26–30	5	Soviet National Team
St. Paul Classic	December 27–28	4	North Dakota
Yankee Conference Tournament	December 27–28	4	New Hampshire
Big Ten Holiday Tournament	December 28–30	4	Minnesota
Boston Arena Christmas Tournament	December 28–30	4	Boston University
Rensselaer Holiday Tournament	December 28–30	4	McMaster
Brown Holiday Tournament	December 29–30	4	Brown
Nichols School Invitational	December 29–30	4	Cornell
Beanpot	February 5, 12	4	Boston University

=== Standings ===
1967–68 Big Ten standings
	Conference							Overall					
	GP	W	L	T	PTS	GF	GA	GP	W	L	T	GF	GA
Michigan†	8	7	1	0	14	45	24	27	18	9	0	152	84
Minnesota	8	3	5	0	6	35	29	31	19	12	0	132	109
Michigan State	8	2	6	0	4	20	42	29	11	16	2	92	111
† indicates conference regular season champion

1967–68 ECAC Hockey standings
	Conference							Overall					
	GP	W	L	T	Pct.	GF	GA	GP	W	L	T	GF	GA
Cornell†*	20	19	1	0	.950	144	29	29	27	2	0	187	43
Clarkson	16	11	5	0	.688	91	68	24	16	7	1	159	85
St. Lawrence	17	11	5	1	.676	86	73	23	14	8	1	124	90
Harvard	21	14	7	0	.667	123	74	24	15	9	0	139	88
Boston University	21	13	6	2	.667	116	61	32	20	9	3	174	89
Brown	20	12	6	2	.650	116	63	24	15	7	2	135	79
Boston College	23	14	8	1	.630	113	79	31	19	11	1	155	116
Princeton	23	13	9	1	.587	92	79	24	13	10	1	93	85
New Hampshire^	13	7	6	0	.538	49	50	29	22	7	0	159	77
Colgate	17	9	8	0	.529	67	65	23	12	11	0	96	83
Rensselaer	17	8	9	0	.471	80	70	22	11	11	0	109	94
Army	12	5	7	0	.417	46	50	24	14	10	0	110	84
Yale	22	6	16	0	.273	43	117	24	6	18	0	50	120
Northeastern	17	4	13	0	.250	56	89	24	6	17	1	87	126
Providence	16	3	13	0	.188	32	114	25	7	18	0	67	149
Dartmouth	21	2	19	0	.095	55	115	23	4	19	0	67	120
Pennsylvania	16	1	15	0	.063	22	154	24	6	18	0	42	180
Championship: Cornell † indicates conference regular season champion * indicates conference tournament champion^ New Hampshire had been readmitted to the ECAC but played only a partial schedule and still qualified for the ECAC II playoffs

1967–68 Independent College Athletic Conference standings
	Conference							Overall					
	GP	W	L	T	PTS	GF	GA	GP	W	L	T	GF	GA
Clarkson†	4	4	0	0	8	24	13	24	16	7	1	159	85
St. Lawrence	4	2	2	0	4	21	19	23	14	8	1	124	90
Rensselaer	4	0	4	0	0	7	22	22	11	11	0	109	94
† indicates conference regular season champion

1967–68 NCAA University Division Independent ice hockey standings
	Conference							Overall					
	GP	W	L	T	PTS	GF	GA	GP	W	L	T	GF	GA
Alaska–Fairbanks	0	0	0	0	-	-	-	8	2	6	0	-	-
Ohio State	0	0	0	0	-	-	-	24	9	13	2	95	126
Wisconsin	0	0	0	0	-	-	-	32	22	10	0	218	92

1967–68 Western Collegiate Hockey Association standings
	Conference							Overall					
	GP	W	L	T	PCT	GF	GA	GP	W	L	T	GF	GA
Denver†*	18	15	3	0	.833	84	32	34	28	5	1	183	65
Michigan Tech	20	15	5	0	.750	76	47	32	22	9	1	131	82
North Dakota*	22	13	8	1	.614	78	57	33	20	10	3	113	80
Michigan	18	11	7	0	.611	83	60	27	18	9	0	152	84
Minnesota	22	13	9	0	.591	98	71	31	19	12	0	132	109
Michigan State	20	6	13	1	.325	57	82	29	11	16	2	92	111
Colorado College	20	4	16	0	.200	40	106	29	9	20	0	84	108
Minnesota-Duluth	24	4	20	0	.167	54	109	28	5	23	0	71	144
Championship: North Dakota, Denver † indicates conference regular season champion * indicates conference tournament champion

== 1968 NCAA Tournament ==
Semifinals; March 14–15
W1	Denver	4
E2	Boston College	1
E1	Cornell	1
W2	North Dakota	3

National championship March 16
W1	Denver	4
W2	North Dakota	0
Third-place game
E1	Cornell	6
E2	Boston College	1

Note: * denotes overtime period(s)

== Player stats ==
=== Scoring leaders ===
The following players led the league in points at the conclusion of the season.

GP = Games played; G = Goals; A = Assists; Pts = Points; PIM = Penalty minutes

Player	Class	Team	GP	G	A	Pts	PIM
Delbert Dehate	Sophomore	Wisconsin	31	47	30	77	23
Mike Hyndman	Sophomore	Boston University	32	23	44	67	51
Bob Poffenroth	Sophomore	Wisconsin	31	30	34	64	44
Brian Cornell	Junior	Cornell	28	29	32	61	22
Larry Davenport	Sophomore	Boston University	31	24	35	59	20
John McLennan	Senior	Clarkson	24	32	25	57	16
Tim Sheehy	Sophomore	Boston College	30	27	30	57	6
Jim Wiste	Senior	Denver	34	21	36	57	25
Richard Davis	Junior	New Hampshire	27	25	31	56	50
Michael Ontkean	Sophomore	New Hampshire	29	30	24	54	12
Bob Trembecky	Sophomore	Denver	29	24	30	54	-

=== Leading goaltenders ===
The following goaltenders led the league in goals against average at the end of the regular season while playing at least 33% of their team's total minutes.

GP = Games played; Min = Minutes played; W = Wins; L = Losses; OT = Overtime/shootout losses; GA = Goals against; SO = Shutouts; SV% = Save percentage; GAA = Goals against average

Player	Class	Team	GP	Min	W	L	OT	GA	SO	SV%	GAA
Ken Dryden	Junior	Cornell	29	1620	25	2	0	41	6	.938	1.52
Gerry Powers	Junior	Denver	34	-	28	5	1	-	7	.918	1.91
Gord McRae	Sophomore	Michigan Tech	12	721	-	-	-	25	2	.926	2.08
Mike Curran	Senior	North Dakota	29	-	-	-	-	-	3	.919	2.19
Dave Hagerman	Senior	New Hampshire	-	-	-	-	-	42	-	.907	2.33
Paul Roy	Senior	Providence	19	-	-	-	-	-	-	-	2.84
John Went	Senior	St. Lawrence	17	1020	-	-	-	51	1	.881	3.00
Jim Keough	Junior	Michigan	25	1500	-	-	-	77	3	.908	3.08
Bob Vroman	Sophomore	Wisconsin	27	1442	16	9	0	75	1	.884	3.12
Rick Metzer	Junior	New Hampshire	18	-	-	-	-	-	-	-	3.13

== Awards ==
=== NCAA ===
Award		Recipient
Spencer Penrose Award		Ned Harkness, Cornell
Most Outstanding Player in NCAA Tournament		Gerry Powers, Denver
AHCA All-American Teams
East Team	Position	West Team
Ken Dryden, Cornell	G	Jim Keough, Michigan
Bruce Pattison, Cornell	D	Terry Abram, North Dakota
Skip Stanowski, Cornell	D	Keith Magnuson, Denver
Brian Cornell, Cornell	F	Gary Gambucci, Minnesota
Wayne Small, Brown	F	Bob Munro, North Dakota
Herb Wakabayashi, Boston University	F	Jim Wiste, Denver

=== ECAC ===
Award		Recipient
Player of the Year		Wayne Small, Brown
Rookie of the Year		Mike Hyndman, Boston University
Most Outstanding Player in Tournament		Ken Dryden, Cornell
All-ECAC Hockey Teams
First Team	Position	Second Team
Ken Dryden, Cornell	G	Ken Leu, Northeastern
Skip Stanowski, Cornell	D	Thomas Rawls, Princeton
Bruce Pattison, Cornell	D	Bob Carr, Harvard
Wayne Small, Brown	F	Mike Hyndman, Boston University
Peter Tufford, Cornell	F	Brian Cornell, Cornell
Gary Croteau, St. Lawrence	F	Herb Wakabayashi, Boston University
	F	John McLennan, Clarkson
	F	Dale Watson, Rensselaer

=== WCHA ===
Award		Recipient
Most Valuable Player		Keith Magnuson, Denver
Sophomore of the Year		Murray McLachlan, Minnesota
Coach of the Year		Murray Armstrong, Denver
All-WCHA Teams
First Team	Position	Second Team
Mike Curran, North Dakota	G	Gerry Powers, Denver
Keith Magnuson, Denver	D	Dick Paradise, Minnesota
Terry Abram, North Dakota	D	Dick Sieradzki, Michigan Tech
Bob Munro, North Dakota	F	Bill Klatt, Minnesota
Jim Wiste, Denver	F	Cliff Koroll, Denver
Gary Gambucci, Minnesota	F	Al Karlander, Michigan Tech

== 1968 NHL Amateur Draft ==
Round	Pick	Player	College	Conference	NHL team
1	9	John Marks	North Dakota	WCHA	Chicago Black Hawks
2	16	Curt Bennett	Brown	ECAC Hockey	St. Louis Blues
2	17	Herb Boxer	Michigan Tech	WCHA	Detroit Red Wings

== See also ==
- 1967–68 NCAA College Division men's ice hockey season
