= Brendan Shanahan =

Canadian ice hockey player and executive (born 1969)

- Hockey Hall of Fame, 2013
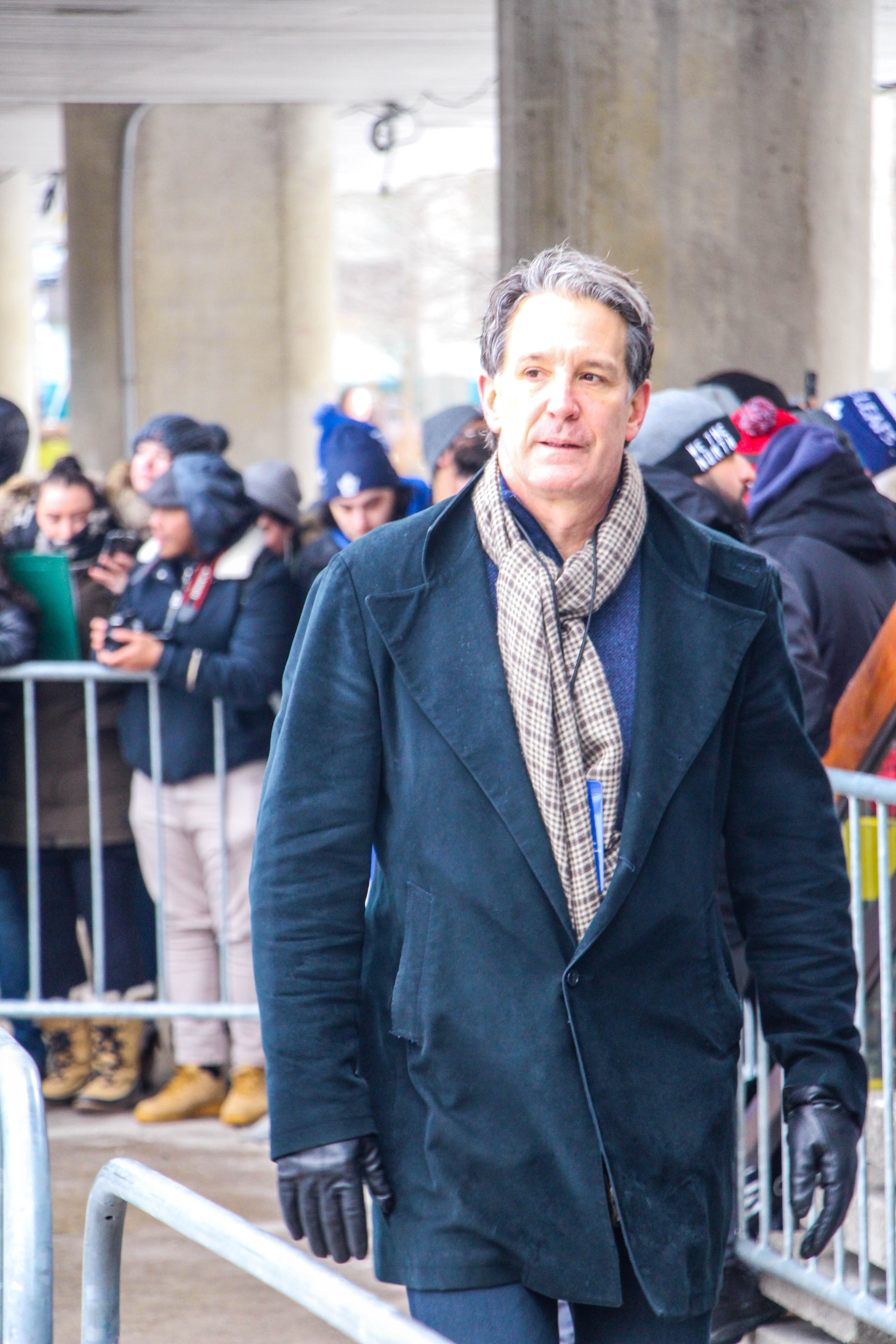
- Shanahan in 2020
- Born: January 23, 1969 (age 57) Etobicoke, Ontario, Canada
- Height: 6 ft 3 in (191 cm)
- Weight: 220 lb (100 kg; 15 st 10 lb)
- Position: Left wing
- Shot: Right
- Played for: New Jersey Devils; St. Louis Blues; Düsseldorfer EG; Hartford Whalers; Detroit Red Wings; New York Rangers
- National team: Canada
- NHL draft: 2nd overall, 1987; New Jersey Devils
- Playing career: 1987–2009
Medal record
Men's ice hockey
Representing Canada
Winter Olympic
Gold medal – first place	2002 Salt Lake City
World Championships
Gold medal – first place	1994 Italy
Canada Cup
Gold medal – first place	1991 Canada

Brendan Frederick Shanahan (born January 23, 1969) is a Canadian professional ice hockey executive and former player. Originally drafted by the New Jersey Devils second overall in the 1987 NHL entry draft, Shanahan played in the National Hockey League (NHL) with the New Jersey Devils (two stints), St. Louis Blues, Hartford Whalers, Detroit Red Wings, and New York Rangers. Following his retirement, Shanahan served as the director of player safety for the NHL, as well as president and alternate governor of the Toronto Maple Leafs. He is currently working with the NHL’s hockey operations department.

While playing with the Red Wings, he won three Stanley Cup championships (1997, 1998, 2002). In 2017 Shanahan was named one of the '100 Greatest NHL Players' in history.

Known for his physical play and goal-scoring ability, Shanahan scored 656 goals in his NHL career spanning over 1,500 NHL games and, at the time of his retirement, was the leader among active NHL players for goals scored. Shanahan is the only player in NHL history with over 600 goals and 2,000 penalty minutes.

Competing for Canada internationally, Shanahan won the 1991 Canada Cup championship, a gold medal at the 1994 World Championships, and a gold medal at the 2002 Winter Olympics, making him a member of the elite Triple Gold Club. Shanahan was inducted into the Hockey Hall of Fame on November 8, 2013.

== Playing career ==
=== New Jersey Devils (1988–1991) ===
Shanahan was drafted by the New Jersey Devils second overall in the 1987 NHL entry draft after Pierre Turgeon. Expectations for Shanahan were high after a stellar career with the London Knights of the Ontario Hockey League (OHL), with whom his number 19 has been retired. In his rookie season with the Devils, in 1987–88, he scored 26 points in 65 games as an 18-year-old. The following season, in 1988–89, he improved to 22 goals and 50 points. In his third NHL season, he emerged as a point-per-game producer with 72 points in 73 games and a top scorer with the Devils; his 30 goals finished tied for second in team goal-scoring behind John MacLean. In his fourth and final year of his initial stint with the Devils in 1990–91, he scored 29 goals and 66 points. At the age of 22, Shanahan was already an established scorer in the NHL. He had also played well in the Devils' playoff runs.

=== St. Louis Blues (1991–1995) ===
Becoming a free agent following the 1990–91 season, Shanahan was signed by the St. Louis Blues on July 25, 1991. According to the collective bargaining agreement, he was a restricted free-agent, and therefore, the Devils were due compensation. Ordinarily, this compensation would be in the form of draft picks, but the Blues already owed four first-round draft picks to the Washington Capitals for signing defenceman Scott Stevens the previous year. The Blues made an offer for compensation that consisted of Curtis Joseph, Rod Brind'Amour and two draft picks even further down the road. However, the Devils were only interested in Scott Stevens. An arbitrator eventually decided that Stevens was to be the compensation, so Shanahan joined the Blues in exchange for Scott Stevens.

Shanahan's first season for the Blues yielded similar statistics to his seasons with the Devils, but he reached another level in 1992–93 with 51 goals and 94 points in 71 games. He finished second in team goal-scoring to Brett Hull and third in team point-scoring overall. Continuing at that pace the next season, in 1993–94, he recorded personal bests of 52 goals, 50 assists and 102 points. In addition to leading the Blues in points, he was named to the 1994 NHL All-Star Game at mid-season and the NHL first All-Star team at the end of the year.

During the 1994–95 NHL lockout, Shanahan played three games for Düsseldorf EG of the Deutsche Eishockey Liga (DEL), scoring five goals and three assists in his short stay overseas. When NHL play resumed, he continued to play well for the Blues, recording 41 points in the lockout-shortened season. In the 1995 playoffs, he led the team in scoring with nine points in five games.

=== Hartford Whalers (1995–1996) ===
After four seasons with the Blues, on July 27, 1995, Shanahan was traded to the Hartford Whalers in exchange for defenceman Chris Pronger, succeeding Pat Verbeek as team captain. In Shanahan's only full season for Hartford, he scored a team-high 44 goals and 78 points and for his efforts was selected to the 1996 All-Star Game. With the uncertainty of the franchise, however, Shanahan requested a trade, and on October 9, 1996, just two games into the 1996–97 season, he was moved with Brian Glynn to the Detroit Red Wings for forward Keith Primeau, defenseman Paul Coffey, and a first round draft pick.

=== Detroit Red Wings and three Stanley Cup wins (1996–2006) ===
Shanahan finished off the 1996–97 season with his usual productivity, scoring a total of 47 goals for the season, and being named to the 1997 NHL All-Star Game. In the 1997 playoffs, he also contributed with nine goals and eight assists, helping the Red Wings to their first Stanley Cup since 1955. They repeated as Cup champions the next year, despite an off season for Shanahan in which he managed just 57 points. The following season, in 1998–99, Shanahan continued at that pace with 58 points, but was still invited to another All-Star Game. Entering the 1999 playoffs as back-to-back Stanley Cup champions, the Red Wings were eliminated by the rival Colorado Avalanche. The next year, in 1999–2000, Shanahan scored 41 goals, indicating a return to his usual form, however, the Red Wings were once again eliminated by the Avalanche in the 2000 playoffs. After the season, he was named to the first All-Star team for the second time in his career. He followed up his resurgent season scoring 76 points in 2000–01, but Detroit was upset in the first round of the 2001 playoffs by the Los Angeles Kings.

The 2001–02 season was a banner one for both Shanahan and the Red Wings. Having picked up future Hall of Famers Brett Hull, Luc Robitaille, and Dominik Hašek in the off-season, the team was primed to win its third Cup since 1997. They cruised to victory and Shanahan continued to play a big role in their success, scoring 37 goals during the regular season and 19 points in their ultimately victorious Stanley Cup run. Shanahan also picked up an Olympic gold medal in Salt Lake City with Team Canada and was named to the second NHL All-Star team. The season was also of particular statistical significance for Shanahan, as shortly preceding his Olympic gold medal victory, he recorded his 1,000th point in the NHL after scoring two goals against Marty Turco in a 4–2 victory over the Dallas Stars on January 12, 2002. Later in the season, Shanahan also reached the 500-goal mark, scoring the game winning goal against Patrick Roy in a 2–0 victory over Colorado on March 23. The win also clinched Detroit a Presidents' Trophy as the top-ranked regular season team.

In the season following Detroit's third Stanley Cup, Shanahan scored 30 goals and 68 points and won the King Clancy Memorial Trophy for his humanitarian efforts. In the following season, however, his production dipped to 25 goals and 53 points, his lowest totals in 15 years. After a one-year absence due to the 2004–05 NHL lockout, Shanahan showed yet another return to form in 2005–06, tallying an impressive 40 goals and 81 points, third among Red Wings in scoring.

=== New York Rangers (2006–2009) ===
Shanahan became a free agent following the 2005–06 season and subsequently signed a one-year, $4 million deal with the New York Rangers. After completing a successful nine-year stay in Detroit, he expressed a desire to move on in his NHL career, stating, "It really came down to an instinct I had. Detroit has a great past and a great future ahead of them as well, but I guess I just felt that maybe I was identified with the past a little bit more than the future."

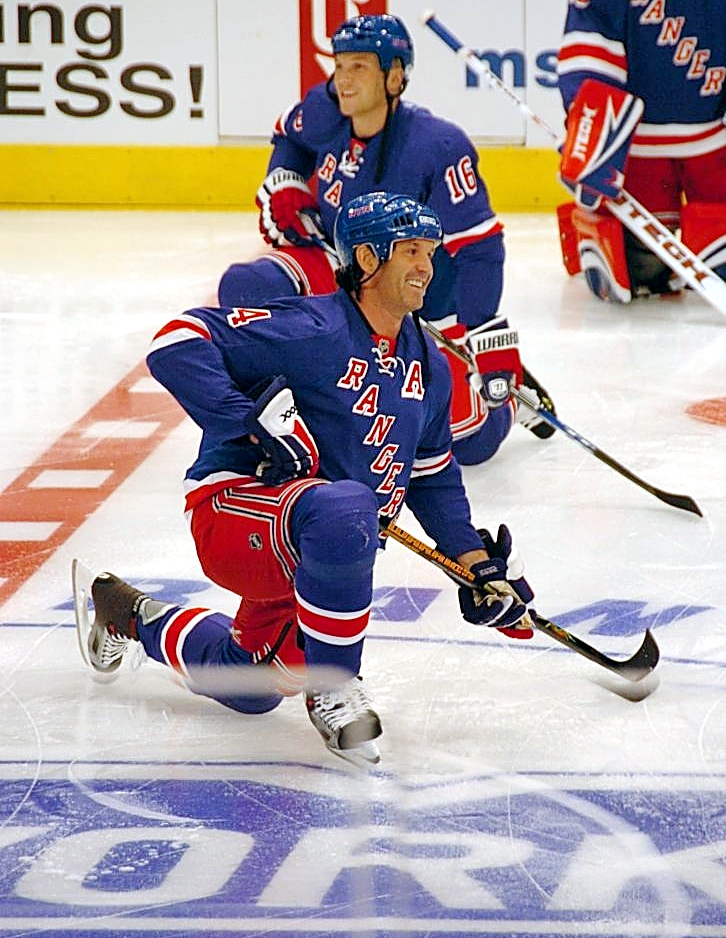
Shanahan (with the "A" on his jersey) warms up during a September 2007 preseason game; his former Red Wings teammate Sean Avery is seen behind him

Shanahan began his Rangers career by scoring his 599th and 600th career goals against Olaf Kölzig on October 5, 2006, in a 5–3 season-opening win against the Washington Capitals at Madison Square Garden. With assists coming from Petr Průcha on both goals, he became just the 15th player in NHL history to reach the 600-goal mark. Shortly thereafter, on November 14, 2006, Shanahan received the inaugural Mark Messier Leadership Award, an award given monthly to a player selected by Mark Messier who best exemplifies leadership skills on and off the ice. Then, selected to his eighth All-Star Game, he was named captain of the Eastern Conference for the 2007 All-Star Game. On February 1, 2007, he made headlines after expressing frustration in a press conference about his perception that NHL referees are biased against team captain Jaromír Jágr. Later in the month, he was involved in a severe on-ice collision with Philadelphia Flyers forward and former Red Wings teammate Mike Knuble in a game on February 17. Shanahan and Knuble caught each other skating in opposite directions as Shanahan was headed for the bench, at which point Shanahan hit his head on the ice and was left unconscious for ten minutes. He was carried off on a stretcher and taken to hospital where he was released the next day. After missing 15 games, Shanahan returned to the lineup in time for the 2007 playoffs, where the Rangers were defeated by the Buffalo Sabres in the second round. Shanahan completed his first season with the Rangers fourth in team scoring with 62 points in 67 games as an alternate captain to Jágr.

After re-signing to another one-year contract with the Rangers, Shanahan struggled to produce offensively as his points total dipped to just 46 points in 2007–08, his lowest total since his rookie season in 1987–88. With his contract expiring in the off-season, he was not tendered an offer by the Rangers, believed to be a result of the Rangers' pursuit of free agent Mats Sundin.

=== Return to New Jersey (2009) ===
Unable to come to terms with the Rangers, Shanahan sat out the first half of the 2008–09 season. Then, on January 10, 2009, it was announced that Shanahan agreed to join the New Jersey Devils for his second stint with the team. Four days later, on January 14, the terms of the contract were finalized and Shanahan signed a one-year, $800,000 prorated contract. The time between Shanahan's departure from and return to the Devils was 17 years, 294 days, the longest gap in tenure with one team in NHL history. On January 19, playing in his first game back with the Devils since 1990–91, he scored the first goal of the game against the Nashville Predators on a 5-on-3 power play by toe dragging the puck around the opposition player and then shooting it. The game was a 3-1 Devils win. On August 5, 2009, Shanahan agreed to a one-year deal with the Devils returning for a 22nd season, to play during the 2009–10 season. This would have been Shanahan's sixth season as a Devil. However, on October 1, 2009, the Devils and Shanahan parted ways, with Shanahan saying, "When I signed this past summer, Lou Lamoriello, Jacques Lemaire and I agreed that if we were unable to find a suitable fit in which I would be able to compete and contribute at the level I expect from myself, then I would simply step aside." Shanahan had played just four preseason games of the 2009–10 season. He scored the Devils' last preseason goal that year, on one of his last NHL shifts.

=== Legacy ===
During the 2004–05 NHL lockout, Shanahan was the mastermind of what was dubbed "The Shanahan Summit," a two-day conference in Toronto. It gathered players, coaches and other influential voices to discuss improvements to the flow and tempo of the game. Ten recommendations were presented to both the NHL and National Hockey League Players' Association (NHLPA).

At the time of his retirement, Shanahan led active NHL players in Gordie Howe hat tricks with 17. Not all teams have kept records of this feat, however, and it is even believed that Gordie Howe himself only officially had two.

When asked by reporter Greg Wyshynski what team would Shanahan associate himself with (using the comparison of the Baseball Hall of Fame using caps for their plaques), Shanahan responded by saying he would choose the Red Wings.

== Executive career ==
=== National Hockey League ===
On November 17, 2009, Shanahan officially announced his retirement after 21 years in the NHL. Shanahan said, "I would like to thank my family and all of the friends who have helped me achieve and maintain my childhood dream of playing in the National Hockey League," Shanahan said in a news release. "I am enormously grateful to all of my coaches and teammates I've had the privilege of learning from and playing alongside of, throughout my career. While I always dreamed of playing in the NHL, I can't honestly say that I would have ever imagined that I'd be this fortunate and blessed. I would like to sincerely thank everyone who has helped me fulfill this dream."

In December 2009, Shanahan accepted an offer from the NHL to become the NHL's vice president of hockey and business development. "In a broad sense, I think obviously, I am going to be another voice in the hockey ops, but at the same time people like [NHL COO] John Collins and [NHL EVP Communications] Gary [Meagher] and [NHL Deputy Commissioner] Bill [Daly] are going to allow me and teach me the business of hockey," Shanahan told NHL.com. "What I was excited about in their offer to bring me on board is that it was wide open for me. There was not going to be any room with a closed door and I would be given an opportunity to see and learn. As time goes by there will be some days where my role is more hockey specific and some days where my role is more business or marketing specific."

Shanahan spoke at the World Hockey Summit in 2010, and sought to bring the fun back into youth developing skills for the game. He felt that, "Anytime you can get a kid out on the ice and just make it fun and he is developing and improving without knowing he's developing and improving, and all he cares about is that he is having a great deal of fun out there, that's when you have really locked onto something valuable".

On June 1, 2011, Shanahan succeeded Colin Campbell as the NHL's senior vice president. When handing out rulings on plays that were sent to his office for review, Shanahan posted videos to the NHL's official Website in which he explained how they either did or did not breach NHL rules. He narrated all videos except French-language videos involving the Montreal Canadiens or Ottawa Senators; these were narrated by a deputy, Stéphane Quintal. These videos were spoofed at the 2012 NHL Awards in Las Vegas, with Will Arnett portraying Shanahan.

In his first season as senior vice president, Shanahan delivered multiple suspensions to players for illegal hits.

=== Toronto Maple Leafs ===
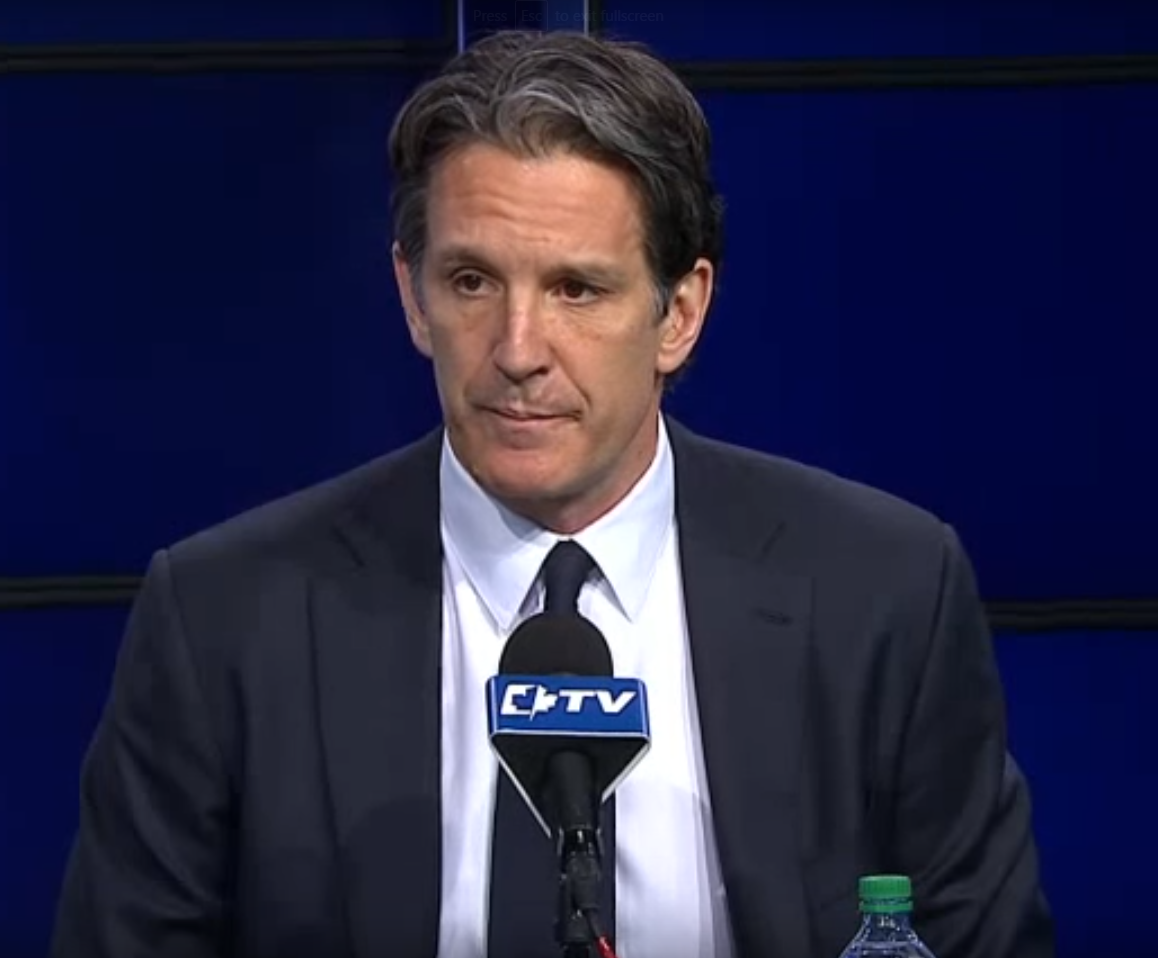
Shanahan in 2015.

On April 11, 2014, Shanahan was officially announced as the Toronto Maple Leafs' president and alternate governor. He was brought on to oversee all operations for the hockey club. On the same day, the NHL announced that Quintal would succeed him as the league's chief disciplinarian.

Shanahan arrived to a Maple Leafs franchise which had qualified for the playoffs just once in the previous 10 years, and had just fallen out of a playoff spot in the late stages of the 2013–14 season. In the 2014–15 season, his first full season in charge, Shanahan made the decision to initiate a long-term, "scorched-earth" rebuild, which he started by firing head coach Randy Carlyle midway through the season despite being in contention for a playoff berth. The team only won only 9 of its 42 games under Carlyle's interim replacement, Peter Horachek, and wound up in second last place in the Eastern Conference and 4th last place in the league. On April 12, 2015, a day after the team's season ended, Shanahan fired Horachek and the rest of the coaching staff, in addition to GM Dave Nonis and several members of the team's scouting staff.

On May 20, 2015, the Maple Leafs announced the hiring of the highly sought-after Mike Babcock, a Stanley Cup champion and two-time Olympic Gold medalist with Team Canada, as the team's new head coach. Babcock agreed to a reported 8-year, $50 million contract, becoming the highest paid coach in the history of the NHL. On the ice, the Maple Leafs, led by Shanahan (along with acting GM's Kyle Dubas and Mark Hunter) drafted Toronto-area native Mitch Marner 4th overall in the 2015 draft and traded forward Phil Kessel, the Maple Leafs' scoring leader for each of his six seasons on the team, to the Pittsburgh Penguins for a package which included a first-round pick and prospect Kasperi Kapanen. On July 24, 2015, the Maple Leafs hired longtime New Jersey Devils GM Lou Lamoriello to serve in the same capacity with the Maple Leafs.

Despite a new off-ice hierarchy led by Babcock and Lamoriello, both highly regarded around the league, the Maple Leafs playing squad remained lackluster and once again finished near the bottom of the standings, actually finishing dead last in the league. However, the season brought some optimism as prospects William Nylander, Kasperi Kapanen, Connor Brown, and Zach Hyman made their NHL debuts. Further optimism arrived at the end of the season, as the Maple Leafs won the top pick in the 2016 draft and drafted Auston Matthews with that pick. Team captain Dion Phaneuf was also traded to the Ottawa Senators mid-season and his position as captain would remain vacant for another three seasons.

Entering the 2016–17 season, expectations remained low for the Maple Leafs, who iced a youthful roster led by top prospects Matthews and Marner, as well as Nylander who became a full-time NHL regular during the season. However, the team wound up surprising many, unexpectedly making the playoffs, led by Matthews' 40-goal season, for which he was recognized with the Calder Trophy as the top rookie, as well as Marner and Nylander's strong rookie seasons (61 points each). They lost to the heavily favoured Washington Capitals, the Presidents' Trophy winners, in a six-game first-round series. Over the next few years, the Maple Leafs established themselves as a contender in the NHL, behind the core of Matthews, Marner, Nylander and Morgan Rielly, making the playoffs in each of the following three seasons but failing to advance past the first round each time.

At the end of the 2017–18 season, Lamoriello left the organization for the New York Islanders and assistant GM Kyle Dubas, Shanahan's first major hire back when he first arrived, was promoted to replace him. Another major acquisition occurred in free agency in 2018, as star centre John Tavares joined the Maple Leafs on a 7-year contract. Shanahan also approved Dubas' decision to fire Babcock in November 2019, amidst a poor start to the 2019–20 season, and the hiring of Sheldon Keefe to replace him.

Shanahan's rebuild of the Maple Leafs was nicknamed "the Shanaplan" among Maple Leafs fans and the media, and he won praise for the method through which he rebuilt the team, by drafting and developing a young core as opposed to signing older players for a quick fix, which was the franchise method before he was hired. However, he and Dubas came under scrutiny for multiple 1st round postseason exits; the Leafs as a team had not advanced to the second round of the postseason since 2004 until their series win over the Tampa Bay Lightning in 2023.

=== Post-Toronto Activities ===
On May 22, 2025, the Maple Leafs gave permission to the New York Islanders to discuss a role in their front office with Shanahan. Later that day, the Maple Leafs announced that Shanahan's contract, set to expire at the end of June, would not be renewed.

In January 2026, Shanahan joined Hockey Canada in reviewing operations of men's junior hockey in Ontario.

== International play ==
Shanahan has participated in seven international tournaments for Canada:

- 1987 World Junior Ice Hockey Championships (Disqualified)
- 1991 Canada Cup (gold medal)
- 1994 World Championships (gold medal)
- 1996 World Cup of Hockey (silver medal)
- 1998 Winter Olympics (4th place)
- 2002 Winter Olympics (gold medal)
- 2006 World Championships (Captain, 4th place)

== Personal life ==
The son of Irish parents, Rosaleen and Donal (d. 1990), Shanahan also excelled in lacrosse. His father was a firefighter and later Chief of Fire Prevention in the city of Toronto. As a youth, he played in the 1982 Quebec International Pee-Wee Hockey Tournament with a minor ice hockey team from Mississauga. He grew up in Etobicoke (now a part of Toronto), where he attended St. Leo's Catholic School and his family attended St. Leo's Roman Catholic Church. Shanahan briefly attended Catholic Central High School in London, Ontario.

Shanahan has three brothers — Danny, Brian and Shaun. He also attended Michael Power/St. Joseph High School, where he played on the hockey team and won an Ontario Federation of School Athletic Associations (OFSAA) gold medal in 1985.

Shanahan married his wife Catherine on July 4, 1998, and the couple have three children. Shanahan became a United States citizen on May 17, 2002. Shanahan has also had small roles in a few films. He appeared in a generic role in Me, Myself & Irene starring Canadian actor Jim Carrey.

== Career statistics ==
=== Regular season and playoffs ===
			Regular season					Playoffs
Season	Team	League	GP	G	A	Pts	PIM	GP	G	A	Pts	PIM
1985–86	London Knights	OHL	59	28	34	62	70	5	5	5	10	5
1986–87	London Knights	OHL	56	39	53	92	128	—	—	—	—	—
1987–88	New Jersey Devils	NHL	65	7	19	26	131	12	2	1	3	44
1988–89	New Jersey Devils	NHL	68	22	28	50	115	—	—	—	—	—
1989–90	New Jersey Devils	NHL	73	30	42	72	137	6	3	3	6	20
1990–91	New Jersey Devils	NHL	75	29	37	66	141	7	3	5	8	12
1991–92	St. Louis Blues	NHL	80	33	36	69	171	6	2	3	5	14
1992–93	St. Louis Blues	NHL	71	51	43	94	174	11	4	3	7	18
1993–94	St. Louis Blues	NHL	81	52	50	102	211	4	2	5	7	4
1994–95	Düsseldorfer EG	DEL	3	5	3	8	4	—	—	—	—	—
1994–95	St. Louis Blues	NHL	45	20	21	41	136	5	4	5	9	14
1995–96	Hartford Whalers	NHL	74	44	34	78	125	—	—	—	—	—
1996–97	Hartford Whalers	NHL	2	1	0	1	0	—	—	—	—	—
1996–97	Detroit Red Wings	NHL	79	46	41	87	131	20	9	8	17	43
1997–98	Detroit Red Wings	NHL	75	28	29	57	154	20	5	4	9	22
1998–99	Detroit Red Wings	NHL	81	31	27	58	123	10	3	7	10	6
1999–00	Detroit Red Wings	NHL	78	41	37	78	105	9	3	2	5	10
2000–01	Detroit Red Wings	NHL	81	31	45	76	81	2	2	2	4	0
2001–02	Detroit Red Wings	NHL	80	37	38	75	118	23	8	11	19	20
2002–03	Detroit Red Wings	NHL	78	30	38	68	103	4	1	1	2	4
2003–04	Detroit Red Wings	NHL	82	25	28	53	117	12	1	5	6	20
2005–06	Detroit Red Wings	NHL	82	40	41	81	105	6	1	1	2	6
2006–07	New York Rangers	NHL	67	29	33	62	47	10	5	2	7	12
2007–08	New York Rangers	NHL	73	23	23	46	35	10	1	4	5	8
2008–09	New Jersey Devils	NHL	34	6	8	14	29	7	1	2	3	2
NHL totals			1,524	656	698	1,354	2,489	184	60	74	134	280

=== International ===
Year	Team	Event	GP	G	A	Pts	PIM
1987	Canada	WJC	6	4	3	7	4
1991	Canada	CC	8	2	0	2	6
1994	Canada	WC	6	4	3	7	6
1996	Canada	WCH	7	3	3	6	8
1998	Canada	OLY	6	2	0	2	0
2002	Canada	OLY	6	0	1	1	0
2006	Canada	WC	8	3	1	4	10
Junior totals			6	4	3	7	4
Senior totals			41	14	8	22	54

== Awards and honours ==
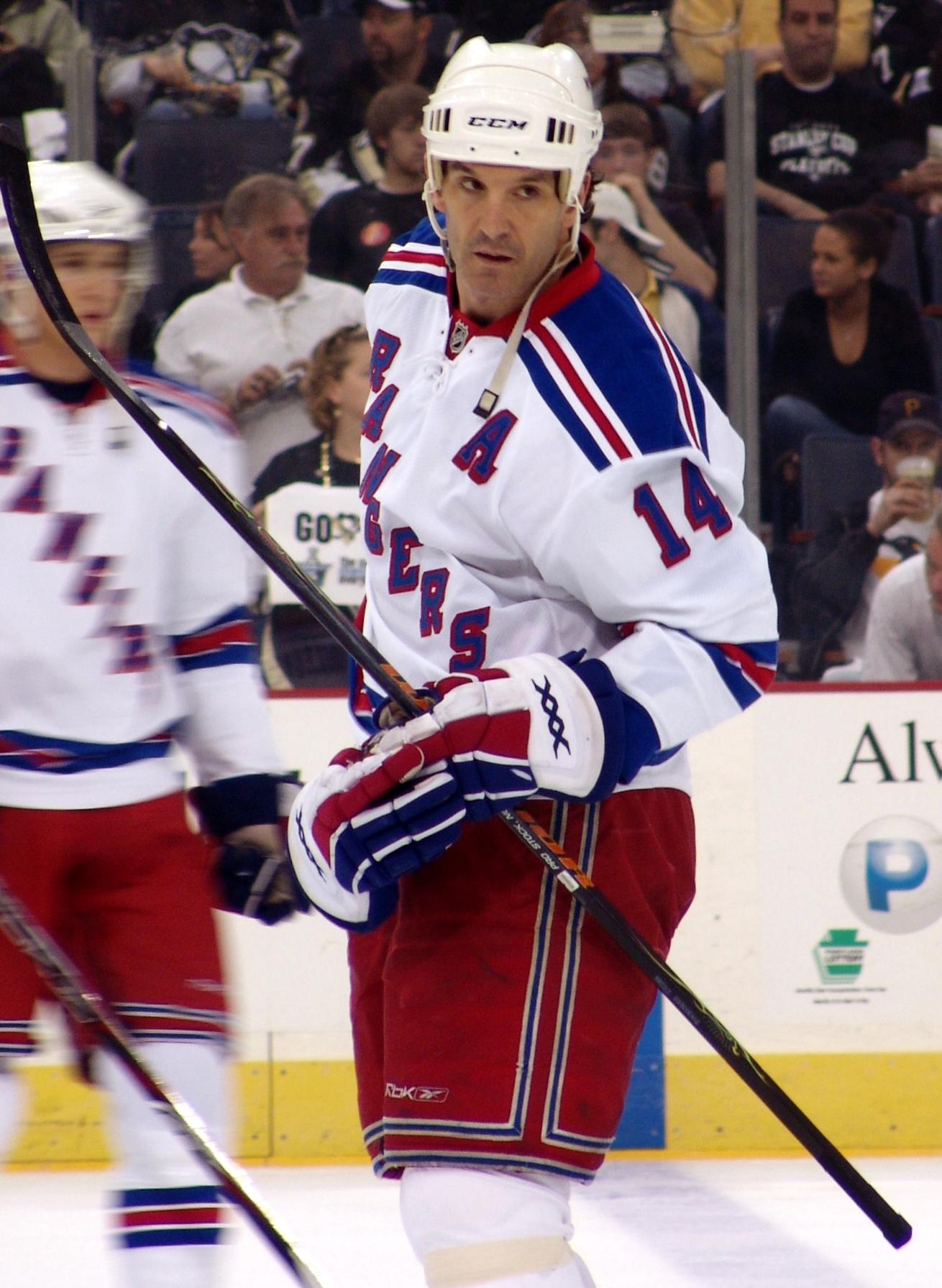
Shanahan was named to the NHL All-Star Game 8 times, being named captain of the Eastern Conference team in 2007.

- Three-time Stanley Cup champion – 1997, 1998, 2002;
- Played in the NHL All-Star Game – 1994, 1996, 1997, 1998, 1999, 2000, 2002, 2007 (captain);
- Named to the NHL first All-Star team in 1994 and 2000;
- Named to the NHL second All-Star team in 2002;
- Awarded the King Clancy Memorial Trophy in 2003;
- Won the Primus Challenge Bowl with World-Stars team in 2004;
- Led NHL in short-handed goals in 1994;
- Led NHL in powerplay goals in 1997;
- Only player with over 600 goals and 2,000 penalty minutes;
- Inducted into the Hockey Hall of Fame;
- Inducted into the Michigan Sports Hall of Fame.
- Holds unofficial record for most Gordie Howe hat tricks by a player during the regular season (17).
- NHL 2K inaugural cover athlete – 2001

== See also ==
- Power forward (ice hockey)
- List of NHL players with 1,000 games played
- List of NHL players with 2,000 career penalty minutes
- List of NHL players with 100-point seasons

Preceded by Neil Brady	New Jersey Devils first-round draft pick 1987	Succeeded by Corey Foster
Preceded by Pat Verbeek	Hartford Whalers captain 1995–96	Succeeded by Kevin Dineen
Preceded by Ron Francis	King Clancy Memorial Trophy winner 2003	Succeeded by Jarome Iginla
