= The Moved and the Shaken =

1993 novel by Ken Dryden

- Author: Ken Dryden
- Language: English
- Genre: Novel
- Publisher: Penguin Books
- Publication date: 1993
- Publication place: Canada
- Media type: Print
- Pages: 306 pages
- Preceded by: Home Game
- Followed by: In School

The Moved and the Shaken is the fourth book and first novel by Canadian author, politician and retired hockey player Ken Dryden. It was first published in 1993 by Penguin Books.

== Plot and setting ==
The novel is set in the eastern suburbs of the Greater Toronto Area, in the communities of Scarborough, Whitby and Oshawa. The story centers around Frank Bloye, an oil company employee dealing with the everyday realities of being a middle-aged, middle-class Canadian family man in the 1990s.
