= World Hockey Summit =

Ice hockey conference in 2010

- Date: August 23–26, 2010
- Venue: Sheraton Centre Toronto Hotel; Air Canada Centre; Hockey Hall of Fame
- Location: Toronto, Ontario, Canada
- Type: Ice hockey conference
- Theme: Global teamwork promoting the growth of the game
- Organized by: Hockey Canada; USA Hockey; National Hockey League; International Ice Hockey Federation; Canadian Hockey League; Molson Coors

The World Hockey Summit was an international ice hockey conference held in Toronto on August 23–26, 2010. It was arranged by the International Ice Hockey Federation, Hockey Canada, USA Hockey, the National Hockey League (NHL), the Canadian Hockey League and Molson Coors as the title sponsor. Its theme was "global teamwork promoting the growth of the game" and emphasized development of players. The summit was organized to create eventual changes in hockey, but the Toronto Star noted that little progress had been made since the Open Ice Summit in 1999, and children playing hockey for the love of the game was still an issue. Discussions were targeted towards national hockey associations, and hockey executives and administrators, and focused on the relationship of the NHL to European leagues and ice hockey at the Olympic Games; and the futures of junior ice hockey, women's ice hockey, and international men's events including the Ice Hockey World Championships.

== Planning ==
The concept for the World Hockey Summit began during the planning stages of the 2010 Winter Olympics when International Ice Hockey Federation (IIHF) executives talked about the importance of sharing global hockey knowledge.

The summit was scheduled for August 23 to August 26 in Toronto, and was arranged by the IIHF, Hockey Canada, USA Hockey, the National Hockey League (NHL), the Canadian Hockey League (CHL) and Molson Coors as the title sponsor. The summit's theme was "global teamwork promoting the growth of the game", with an emphasis on development of players. Discussion was targeted towards national hockey associations, executives and administrators for hockey leagues and clubs, coaches, player agents and business people in hockey; and included sessions designed to allow for participation in person or via social media.

Bob Nicholson was the lead administrator for the summit. Admission was priced at C$450 and was open to the public.

== Schedule ==
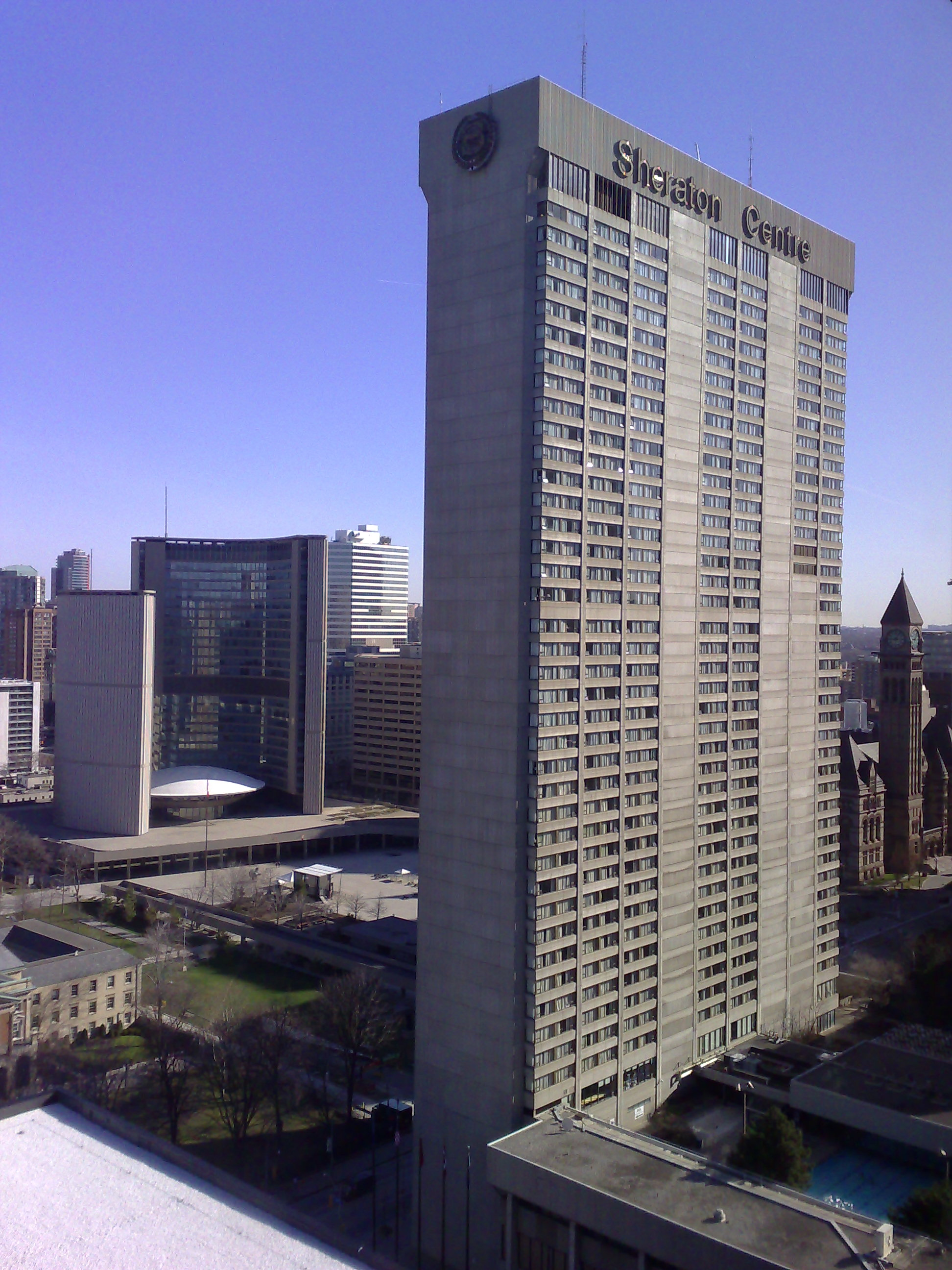
The Sheraton Centre Toronto Hotel

World Hockey Summit schedule:

Date	Time	Session topic	Venue
August 23	evening	Opening gala – Celebrating the game	Hockey Hall of Fame
August 23	evening	Hot stove league sessions: Contracts and transfers; Role of agents in with young players; International and North American game comparison	Hockey Hall of Fame
August 24	morning	Player skills development	Air Canada Centre
August 24	afternoon	René Fasel (IIHF president) Q&A session	Air Canada Centre
August 24	afternoon	Junior development in the hockey world	Air Canada Centre
August 25	morning	Ice hockey at the 2010 Winter Olympics evaluation	Sheraton Centre Toronto Hotel
August 25	afternoon	Gary Bettman (NHL commissioner) Q&A session	Sheraton Centre Toronto Hotel
August 25	afternoon	Long-term agenda for international events	Sheraton Centre Toronto Hotel
August 26	morning	Future of women's ice hockey at the Olympic Games	Sheraton Centre Toronto Hotel
August 26	afternoon	Growing participation in hockey	Sheraton Centre Toronto Hotel

== Sessions ==
=== Hot stove league ===
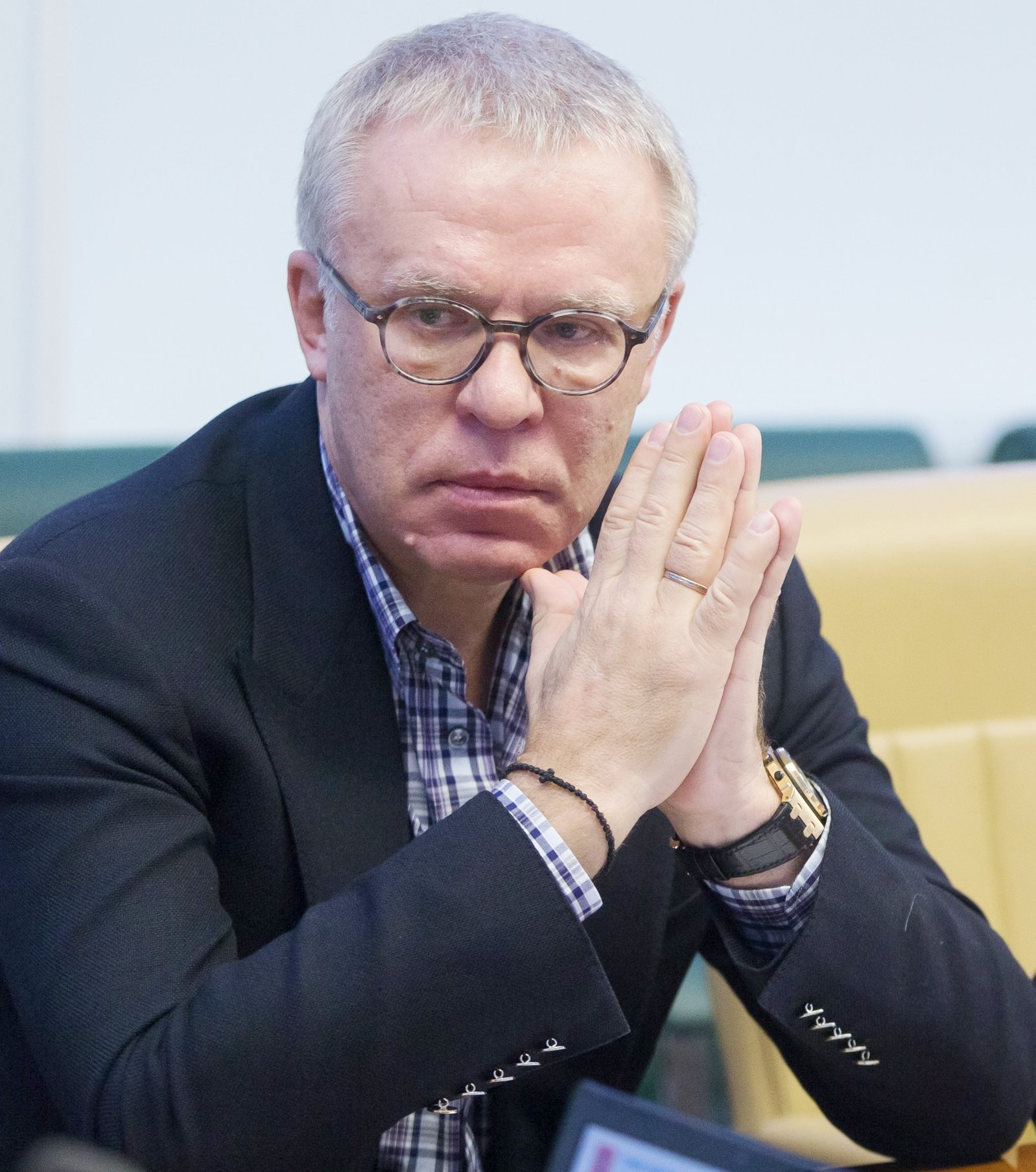
Viacheslav Fetisov in 2015

The first hot stove league discussion dealt with relations between Russia and the NHL. Kontinental Hockey League (KHL) chairman Viacheslav Fetisov discussed wanting to improve its relationship with the NHL with respect to transfer agreements and player contracts. His league sought greater financial compensation when its players departed for the NHL, instead of negotiating a flat rate for an unlimited number of transfers. The NHL was also eager to have a relationship since no transfer agreement existed at the time, and its teams sought better assurance that Russian players would to North America when selected in the NHL entry draft.

The second discussion included Pat Brisson and Don Meehan who were sports agents for NHL players, who discussed how their role was necessary in finding talent from Europe to play junior ice hockey in North America. Toronto Maple Leafs team president Brian Burke joined the discussion, and felt that players' parents were partly to blame and was critical of them seeking agents for 14-year-olds.

The third discussion compared the game in North America with Europe, and attempts to introduce the NHL into the European market. Daniel Alfredsson and Glenn Healy felt that the NHL experiment of playing regular season games in Europe was not successful, whereas NHL deputy commissioner Bill Daly wanted to increase the number of games and market its most popular teams. Journalist Paul Romanuk suggested an end-of-season championship between the NHL and Europe. Panelists felt the NHL had nothing to gain from the proposal, despite support from European-born players in the NHL.

=== Player skills development ===
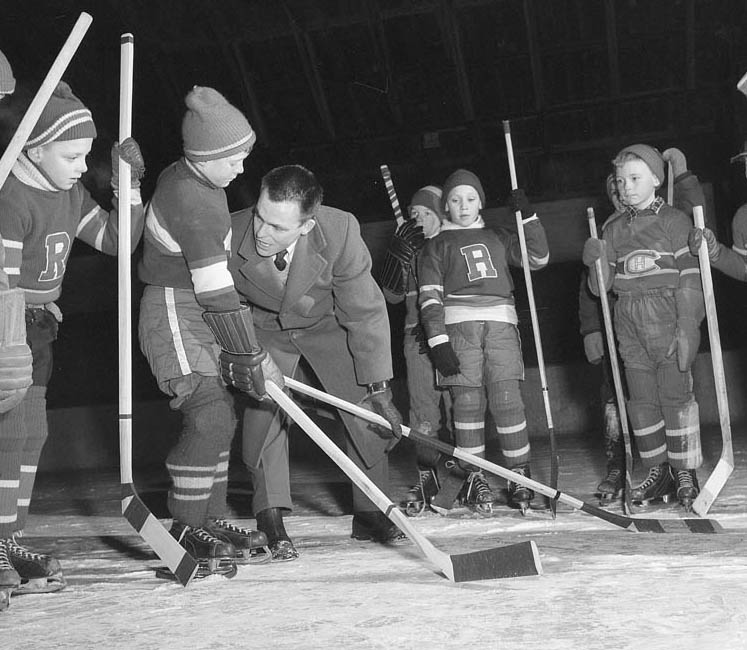
Boys learning proper body checking technique, c. 1956

The discussion on player skills development included recent concerns for the safety for athletes. The NHL described the debate on what age to introduce body checking at the minor ice hockey level or whether to eliminate it altogether, as "one of the livelier subjects". Mark Aubry, the chief medical officer of Hockey Canada, spoke at the summit and cautioned against returning to play from a head injury too soon, and cited recent studies on the effects of concussions. He called for raising the minimum age for body checking to 13 or 14 and eliminating hits from behind. He argued that children should develop skills instead as they are vulnerable to injury due to height and weight differences. He cited research on the long-term effects for athletes who have had multiple concussions, specifically younger hockey players.

Aubry stated, "We're exposing these kids to an increased risk of injury at an age where I think we should still be talking about skill development and having fun". NHL vice-president Brendan Shanahan echoed the statement of Aubry and said, "Anytime you can get a kid out on the ice and just make it fun and he is developing and improving without knowing he's developing and improving, and all he cares about is that he is having a great deal of fun out there, that's when you have really locked onto something valuable". Hockey coach Bob Boughner hoped for continued discussions on player safety and skills, but was not optimistic for change to happen quickly.

=== René Fasel Q&A ===
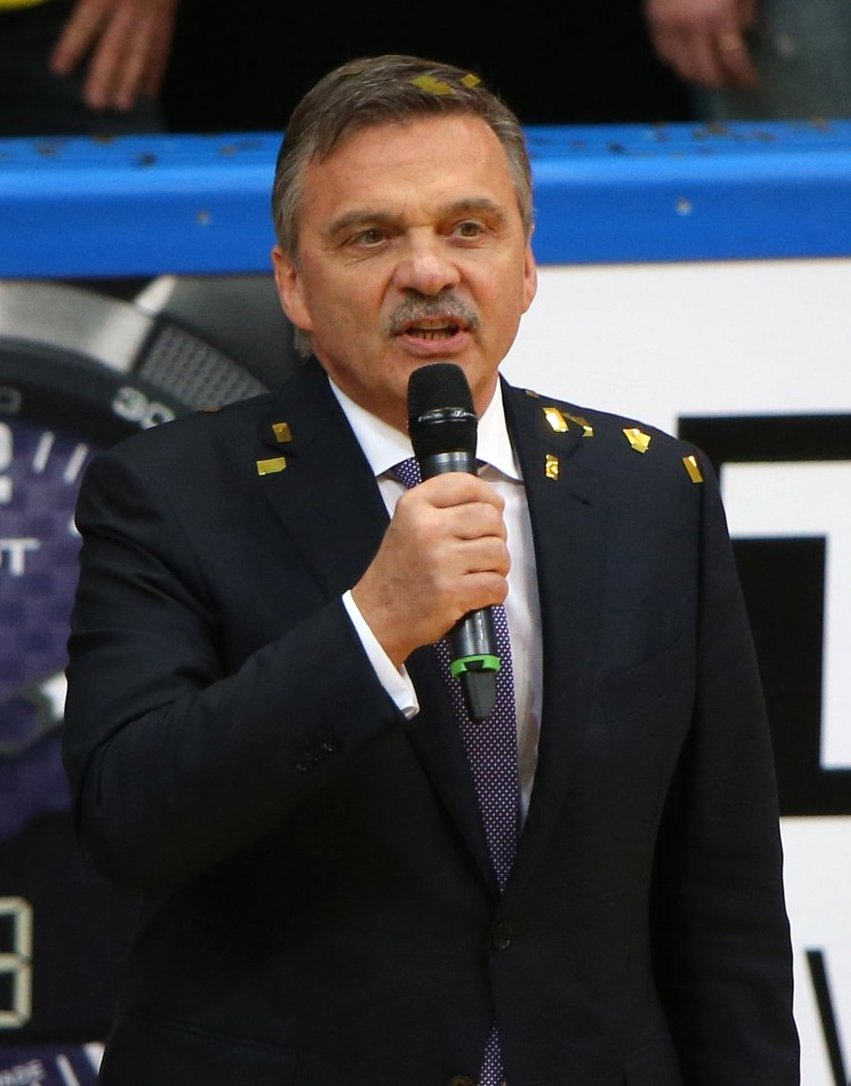
René Fasel in 2016

IIHF president René Fasel spoke in a question and answer session, and discussed the NHL presence in Europe and in ice hockey at the Olympic Games. Despite NHL success in marketing its brand in Europe which included several regular season games, Fasel was defensive of European hockey. He was against NHL expansion plans into Europe and vowed not to let it happen. He instead envisioned a multi-country European professional league, where the European champion would play the Stanley Cup winner for a world title. He further explained that rinks in Europe were typically had a lesser seating capacity those in North America, and that European ticket prices were less than typical NHL prices. He felt it was not a viable economy for the NHL games considering travel costs and profits margins.

Despite being against expansion into Europe, Fasel sought to keep NHL participation at the Winter Olympics due to its profitability and exposure for international hockey, although the NHL had not committed to the 2014 Winter Olympics. The hockey tournament has become one of the biggest events at the Olympics, since the NHL first participated in 1998. He felt that the Olympics were optimal to promote the league, the game and the players, and appealed for fans of the game to support NHL participation despite the continued negotiations.

=== Junior hockey development ===
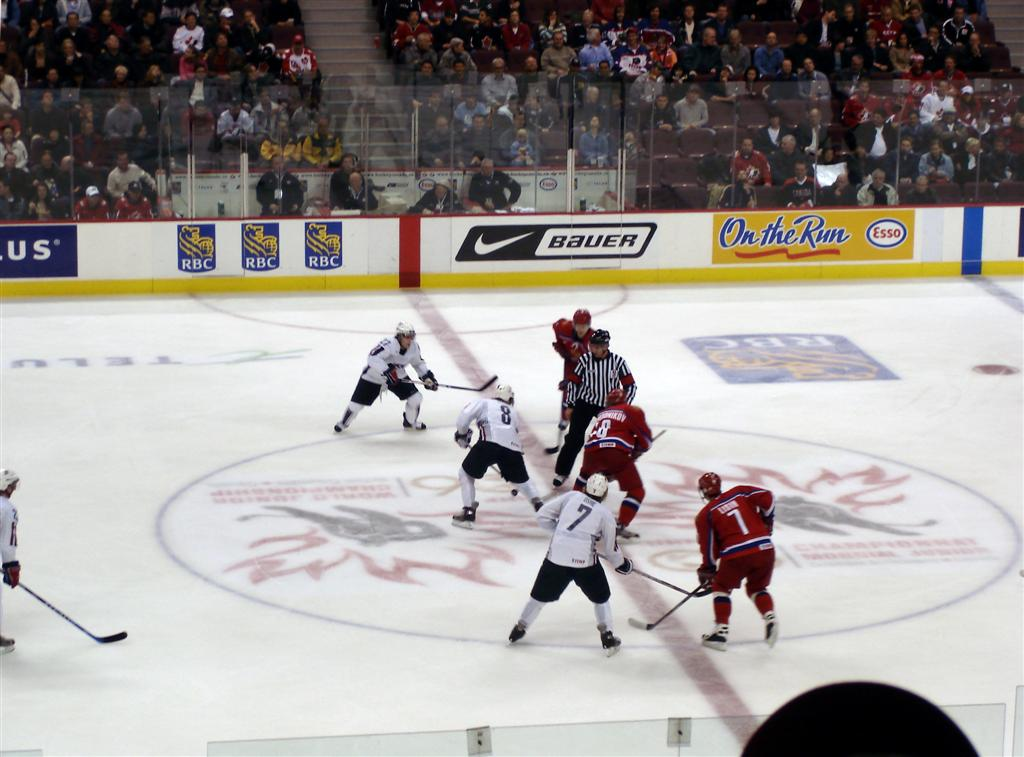
Russia vs. United States at the 2006 World Junior Ice Hockey Championships

Nations in Europe were concerned about the number of junior ice hockey players leaving to play in North America, despite the improved talent level and the increasing popularity of the IIHF Ice Hockey World Junior Championships. Discussions at the summit included maintaining the level of competition at the World Junior Championships; limits of the collegiate programs; and Europeans developing in the CHL and the American Hockey League.

Slavomir Lener, a director with the Czech Ice Hockey Association, felt that junior-aged players were enticed to play in North America before maturation, with had a negative effect on the development of the player and the European system. He stated that of the 527 Czech Republic players who went to North American junior hockey, only 22 of them played more than 400 NHL games. He sought to establish a European system that was competitive enough to deter players from entering into the CHL Import Draft.

=== 2010 Winter Olympics ===
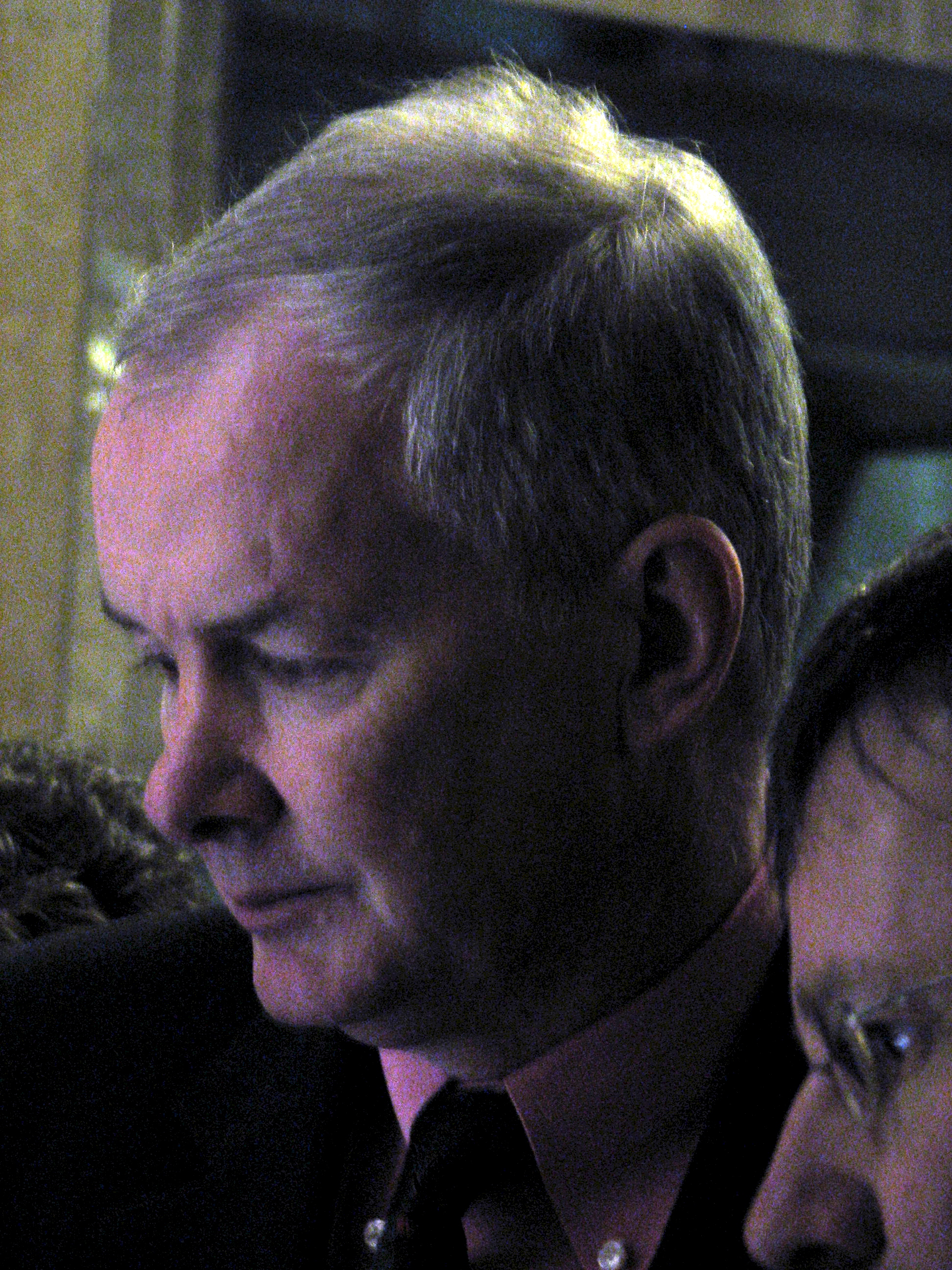
John Furlong in 2006

The men's tournament at the 2010 Winter Olympics was evaluated at the summit. Discussion included analysis on its financial aspects, costs and benefits of NHL players at the games, television viewership, scheduling of games, and the usage of the smaller NHL-sized ice surface instead of larger international-sized ice surface. Brian Burke wanted the NHL participation in the Olympics to continue, but felt that teams should receive financial compensation while the NHL season was on hiatus during the Olympics. He proposed allowing the NHL oversee a world championship which had potential to a financially lucrative venture while league games were not being played. John Furlong who was the chief executive officer of the Vancouver Organizing Committee for the 2010 Olympic and Paralympic Winter Games, felt it was important to reach a deal with the NHL, and stated that "The fans would never forgive you. That's what I think should be driving you to a solution".

=== Gary Bettman Q&A ===
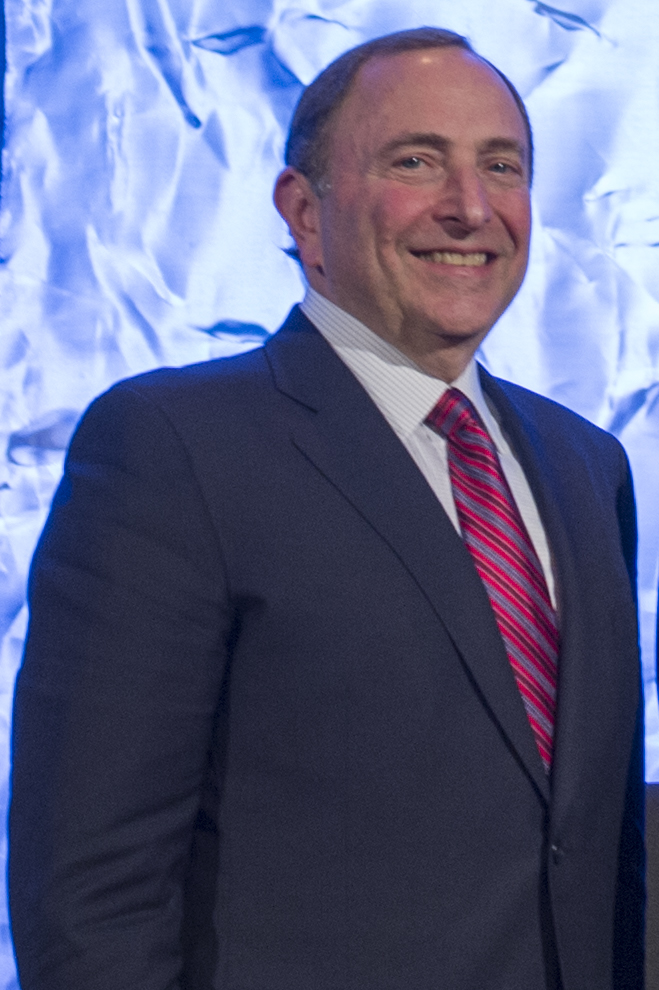
Gary Bettman in 2016

NHL commissioner Gary Bettman spoke in a question and answer session, and discussed NHL participation at the Olympic Games and reiterated that no decision had been made about the 2014 Winter Olympics. He stated being in the Olympics was a "mixed bag" for the NHL, and experiences outside of North America tended not to be positive. He gave a list of issues that he wanted to see resolved in consultation with the National Hockey League Players' Association. Issues included were, more control over marketing and promotion, timing of games being televised in North America, the hiatus in the NHL regular season schedule, ability for NHL team executives to access their players, travel concerns, and risk of injuries. He briefly discussed NHL presence in Europe and denied there were discussions on expansion there, but stated that the IIHF had asked about the NHL operating a champions league.

=== Agenda for international events ===
The summit discussed the long-term agenda for international events, which included the World Cup of Hockey for national teams and the possibility of a similar competition for professional teams. Former Switzerland men's national ice hockey team coach Ralph Krueger spoke about the need to co-ordinate IIHF and NHL events to work towards global growth of the game. He suggested that the World Cup of Hockey be played every four years, alternating with the Olympic Games every two years. He wanted to see World Championships became an under-23 event during Olympic years. He felt it would be beneficial to national teams to evaluate their younger talent at the international level, and the under-23 event would be ideal opportunity.

Krueger wanted to resurrect the Champions Hockey League and Victoria Cup competitions, which he felt would make the game more popular in Europe. He felt it was important to spread out events not to cause fatigue in players but still give importance to international events. He noted that the European season was shorter than in North America, and included only 60 games which ended before the World Championships. He recommended that national teams be planned to operate on a four-year cycle for international events. He noted the importance of keeping the World Championships healthy since it generates profits for the IIHF invest into developing the game.

=== Future of women's ice hockey ===
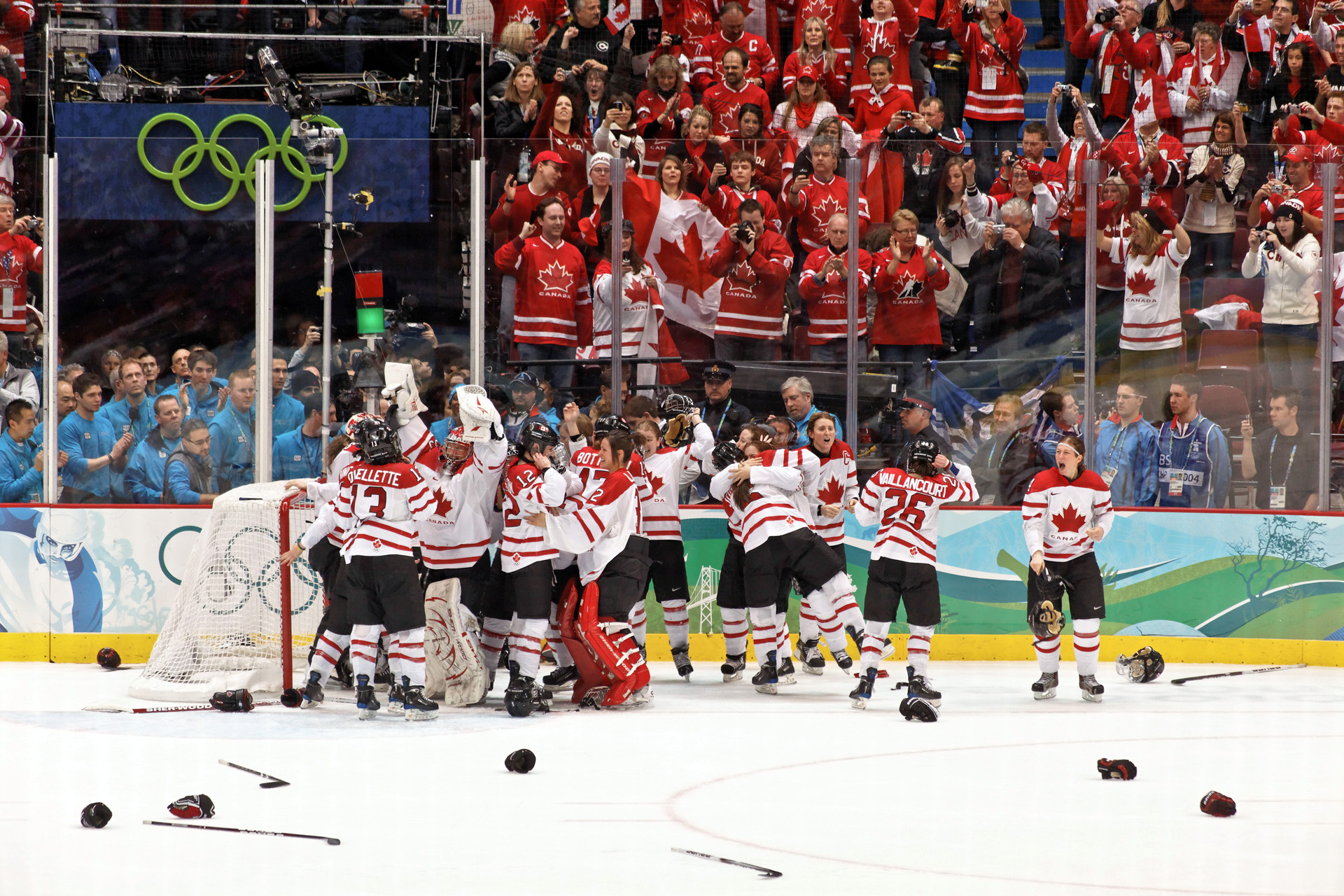
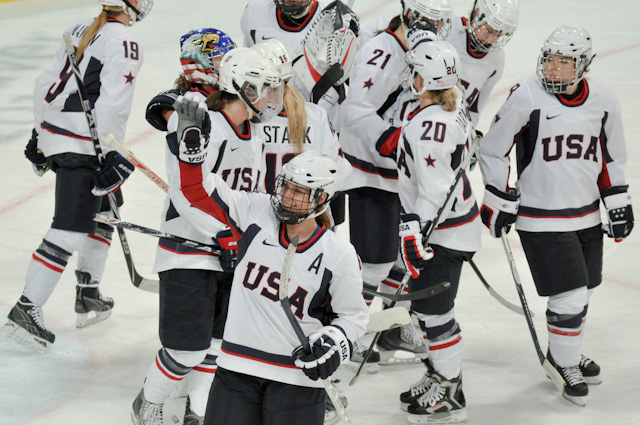
The national women's ice hockey teams for Canada and the United States had dominated competition at the Olympic Games and World Championships.

The future of international women's ice hockey was discussed on the final day of the summit. The session dealt with how IIHF member associations could work together to grow the game and increase registration numbers, and the relative strength of the women's game in North America compared to the rest of the world. International Olympic Committee president Jacques Rogge raised concerns that the women's hockey tournament might be eliminated from the Olympics since the event was not competitively balanced. Canada and the United States are the only countries to win the gold since the event began in 1998, and the two countries had also won each IIHF World Women's Championship since the event began in 1990.

Team Canada captain Hayley Wickenheiser explained that the talent gap between the North American and European countries was due to the presence of women's professional leagues in North America, along with year-round training facilities. She stated the European players were talented, but their respective national team programs were not given the same level of support as the European men's national teams, or the North American women's national teams. She stressed the need for women to have their own professional league which would be for the benefit of international hockey. IIHF vice-president Murray Costello promised to invest $2-million towards developing international women's hockey.

=== Growing participation in hockey ===
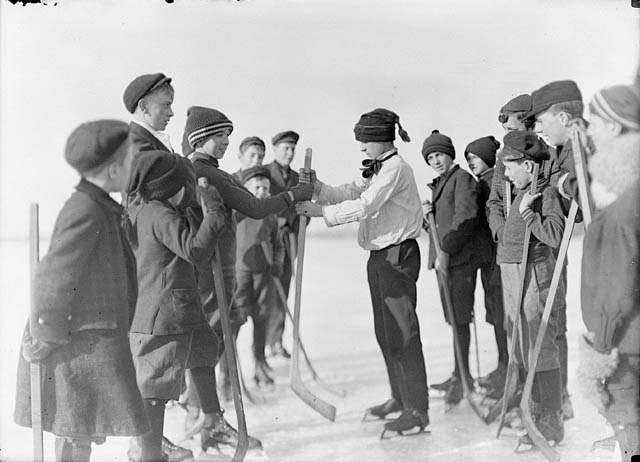
Children playing shinny, a form of recreational ice hockey

The summit concluded with a session that discussed how to increase youth participation in hockey. Hockey Canada vice-president and chief operating officer Scott Smith expressed concerns that youth hockey was no longer growing in Canada. He stated that 9.1% of Canadian children from ages 9 to 15 were playing ice hockey, a figure which had changed in the last decade. He felt that the increasing cost of playing, and increasing cultural diversity which embraced other sporting options and contributing factors; and it would be necessary for minor hockey associations to promote the game and make it easier to participate.

== Reception ==
Robert Cribb of the Toronto Star felt that little progress had been made in improving Canadian ice hockey since the Open Ice Summit in 1999. He noted the desire to focus on playing hockey for the love of the game as an issue that was still being discussed.

Greg Wyshynski of Yahoo Sports felt that too much discussion was about how money is involved in the game, and that panelists were not compelling and did not engage in constructive dialogue. He felt an opportunity was missed to discuss promoting the game via electronic media including television and video games, and to appeal to new audiences by breaking down cultural barriers.

The Waterloo Region Record noted that United States college ice hockey overseen by the National Collegiate Athletic Association was not included at the World Hockey Summit, and suggested the omission was due to a recruiting war with the Canadian Hockey League for players.

Hockey Canada and fellow organizers hoped for the summit to lead to social networking between the international ice hockey executives in attendance, and lead to eventual changes in hockey.
