= Greg Wyshynski =

American sportswriter and reporter

Greg Wyshynski (born March 20, 1977) is an American sportswriter and radio personality, best known for creating Yahoo! Sports’ ice hockey blog Puck Daddy. He has written two books, Glow Pucks and 10-Cent Beer and Take Your Eye Off the Puck.

== Career ==
=== Early career ===
Wyshynski is a 1999 graduate of University of Maryland's College of Journalism. In 2000, he started working for The Connection Newspapers of Northern Virginia and spent nearly ten years as a writer and editor there, rising through the ranks to executive sports editor. While at The Connection, Wyshynski received over 50 Virginia Press Association awards, including four first-place citations for sports column writing.

During this time, Wyshynski branched out into other sports writing, serving as an editor for SportsFan magazine and writing a weekly syndicated sports column, "The Jester’s Quart". In 2006, Wyshynski signed on with AOL Sports’ FanHouse as an NHL writer. He also wrote the weekly "NHL Closer" for Deadspin under the editor Will Leitch.

=== Yahoo! Sports ===
In 2008, Wyshynski left The Connection and joined Yahoo! Sports full-time. As the editor-in-chief of Puck Daddy, he became the first blogger ever named to The Hockey News "100 People of Power and Influence" list. He covered the Vancouver, London, Sochi and Rio de Janeiro Olympics for Yahoo! Sports, as a general columnist for the 2012 and 2016 Games. Wyshynski is a member of the Professional Hockey Writers Association.

Wyshynski covered the World Hockey Summit in 2010. He felt that too much discussion was about how money is involved in the game, and that panelists were not compelling and did not engage in constructive dialogue. He felt an opportunity was missed to discuss promoting the game via electronic media, including television and video games, and to appeal to new audiences by breaking down cultural barriers.

In 2011, Wyshynski partnered Jeff Marek of Sportsnet to create Marek Vs. Wyshynski, a daily live hockey podcast. He has also appeared as a guest on many podcasts, including Slate's Hang Up and Listen, The B.S. Report, Doug Loves Movies, The Stars Wars Minute and NPR’s The Weigh In.

=== ESPN ===
On September 29, 2017, Wyshynski announced his resignation from Yahoo! Sports, and that he was leaving Puck Daddy to the site's other writers. It was subsequently announced that he would join ESPN as an NHL analyst and reporter for ESPN.com. Prior to ESPN regaining NHL media rights, he had hosted one podcast, "ESPN On Ice" with fellow ESPN hockey reporter Emily Kaplan. Due to ESPN contract restrictions he no longer co-hosts the top ranking hockey podcast "Puck Soup", with hockey writer Sean McIndoe (commonly known by the pseudonym "Down Goes Brown") of The Athletic and Ryan Lambert (formerly of Yahoo! Sports).

== Personal life ==
Wyshynski is a native of Matawan, New Jersey, and resides in the San Francisco Bay Area. Since childhood, he has been a fan of the New Jersey Devils.

He is married and has one daughter from a previous relationship.

== Books ==
- Glow Pucks & 10-Cent Beer: The 101 Worst Ideas in Sports History, published in April 2006 by Taylor Trade.
- Take Your Eye Off the Puck, published in November 2015 by Triumph Books.
- The 100 Greatest Players In NHL History (And Other Stuff): An Arbitrary Collection of Arbitrary Lists, published in January 2017 by Amazon Kindle eBooks.
