= Open Ice Summit =

Ice hockey conference in 1999

- Date: August 25–27, 1999
- Venue: Hockey Hall of Fame
- Location: Toronto, Ontario, Canada
- Type: Ice hockey conference
- Theme: Ice hockey in Canada and player development
- Organized by: Hockey Canada; National Hockey League; Canadian Hockey League; Molson Brewery

The Open Ice Summit was an ice hockey conference held in Toronto on August 25–27, 1999. It was arranged by Hockey Canada in co-operation with the National Hockey League and the Canadian Hockey League, in response to Canadian national ice hockey teams struggling and a general panic in Canada. The summit's primary focus was player development in Canada, and was targeted at league executives, parents, coaches and hockey associations. Discussions produced a list of 11 recommendations to improve hockey in Canada, which included a campaign aimed at Canadian parents on why players needed more practices than games. The summit's recommendations ultimately led to fundamental changes in how Canadian players were trained.

== Background ==
Canadian national ice hockey teams had struggled leading up to 1999, and there was a general panic in Canada. The Canada men's national ice hockey team placed fourth at the 1998 Winter Olympics and sixth at the 1998 IIHF World Championship. The Canada women's national ice hockey team lost the gold medal game at the 1998 Winter Olympics, and the Canada men's national junior ice hockey team placed eighth in at the 1998 World Junior Ice Hockey Championships.

Women's national team player Cassie Campbell felt there too much panic after 1998 Winter Olympics, since it was only one game that was lost. Men's national team player Trevor Linden felt there was no reason to panic, but it would be good to find ways to improve minor ice hockey, and that Canadians thought no other country should have players as good as Canada.

== Planning ==
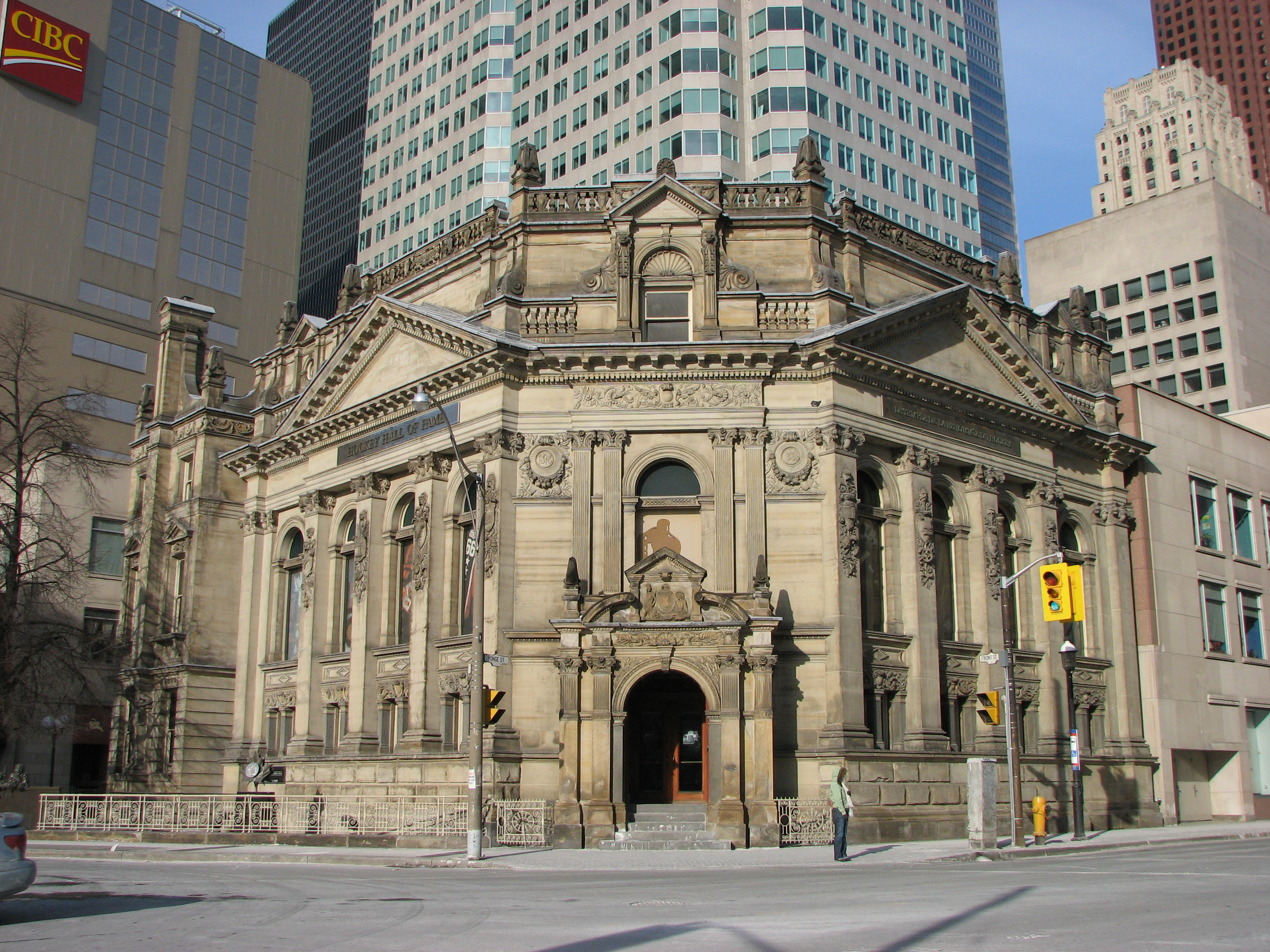
Hockey Hall of Fame

The Open Ice Summit was scheduled for August 25 to 27, 1999, in Toronto, and arranged by Hockey Canada in co-operation with the National Hockey League (NHL) and the Canadian Hockey League (CHL). Molson Brewery was the title sponsor for the summit, and Bob Nicholson was the lead administrator behind the summit. Delegates to the event included the Hockey Canada and CHL membership in addition to representatives from the NHL and the National Hockey League Players' Association. The summit's primary focus was to discuss player development in Canada, and was targeted at league executives, parents, coaches and hockey associations. Wayne Gretzky was named honorary chairman of the summit, which opened with a reception at the Hockey Hall of Fame.

== Discussions ==
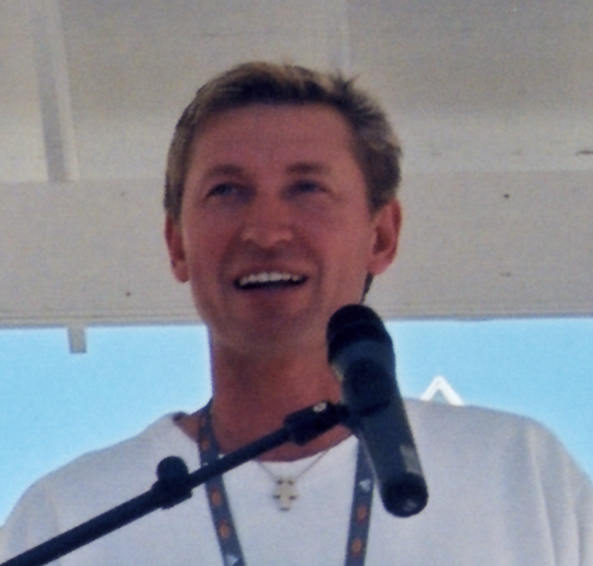
Wayne Gretzky in 2001

Wayne Gretzky and his father Walter Gretzky attended the opening gala and stressed the need to play and practice hockey for the love of the game. Wayne stated, "Let them go out there at 8 years old and do what we all did as kids. Grab a puck and try to get it into the net. I'm adamant that kids just need to have fun". He felt that skill was more important to develop than talent, and that Canada had the potential to be world leaders in skill development.

A theme of the summit was that more practices would be better than playing games, and it would be difficult to convince Canadian parents who want to see their child play. Canada men's national team head coach Dave King advocated for more time to practice skills compared to playing time. He compared the Canadian system which looked for physical size first and introduced body contact at a young age, where as the European system looked for skills first, practiced three times as much as the Canadian model, and did not have body contact in youth hockey. Detroit Red Wings head coach Scotty Bowman noted that European players on his team looked forward to practices and were better prepared.

Journalist Pierre LeBrun criticized the Canadian system for playing too many games and children not practicing enough to develop skill, and that junior ice hockey was overseen by the CHL, which was a profit-driven business. Bob Nicholson felt it necessary to find a balance since both practice and business were important. Writer Michael McKinley stated that delegates generally wanted to see a less rigid structure at younger age groups, and to let kids have fun and try new things without repercussions for mistakes. Toronto Maple Leafs president Ken Dryden wanted delegates to accept that progress made at the lower levels and off the ice was important in achieving international results.

== Recommendations ==
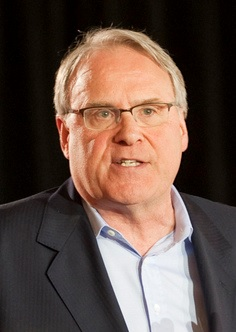
Ken Dryden in 2011

The summit produced 11 recommendations to improve Canadian hockey. Ken Dryden and Bob Nicholson were cautious that change would come slowly and be costly, but felt the summit was an important step in making progress.

The 11 recommendations were:

1. System of mentor coaches for minor ice hockey associations, with one professional coach per twenty amateur coaches
2. Number of games should not be greater than the number of practices
3. Adjust age limits so the same players are not always the oldest in each group
4. Educate importance of skills development and give recognition for skills
5. Expand marketing and education aimed at first-time players
6. Provide more coaching education including online modules
7. Examine raising the age for draft eligible players
8. Educate public on having respect for all participants, the rules and the sport
9. Educate all hockey participants on the recommendations resulting from the Open Ice Summit
10. Co-operation between hockey associations, school boards, and sponsors to improve sports in school
11. Improve communication between hockey partners on program developments

== Subsequent events ==
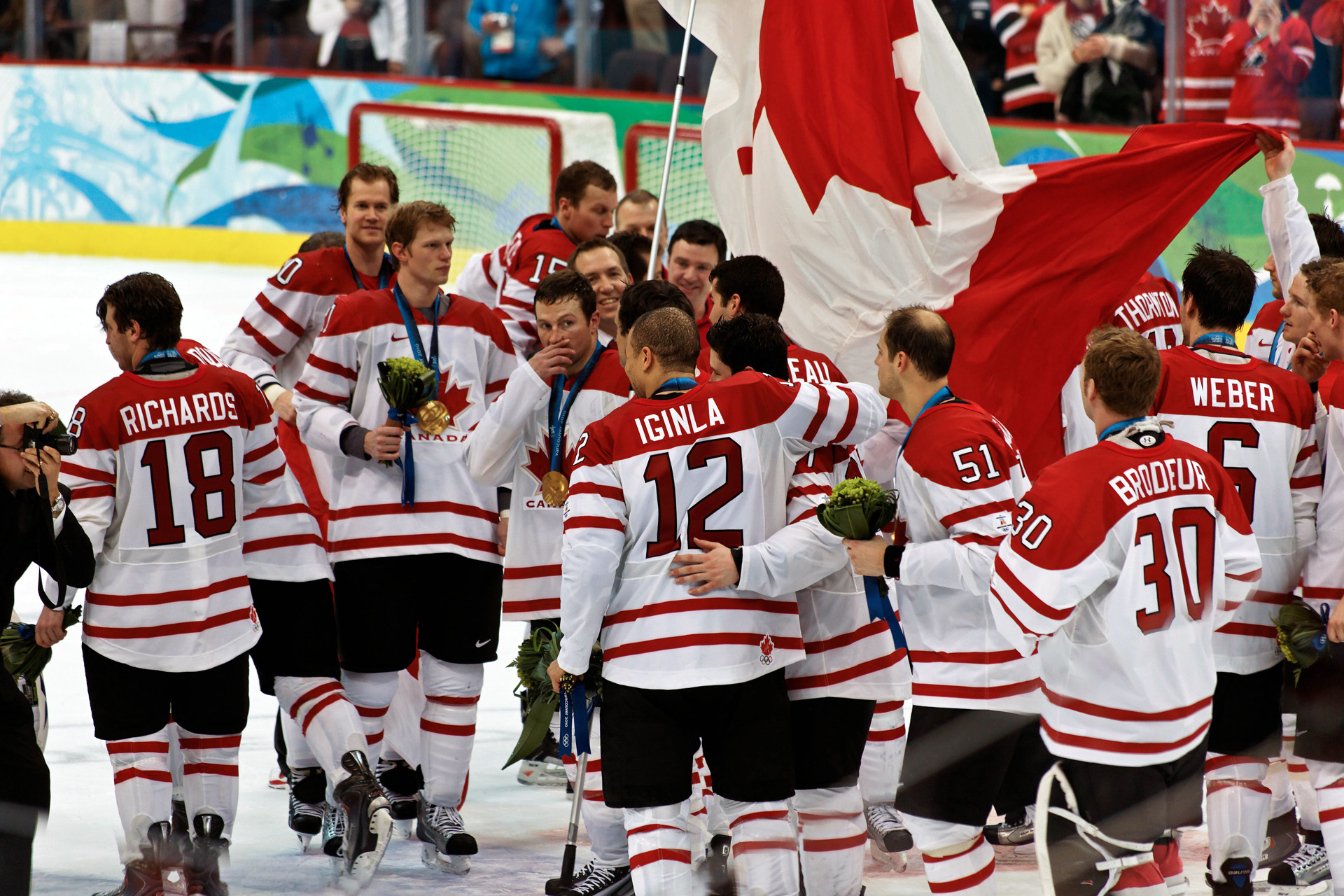
The Canada men's national team celebrate a gold medal won at the 2010 Winter Olympics

Hockey Canada and the Ontario Hockey Federation planned meetings to follow up on the recommendations, and to brainstorm methods of implementation. Ontario Hockey League executive Sherwood Bassin wanted to see more education aimed at parents for the rationale behind more practices than games.

Hockey Canada distributed bulletins to its members on the summit's recommendations, and held discussion forums on them. Nicholson encouraged players, parents coaches to provide feedback and participate online. Dryden believed that in 20 years, privately run sports schools would be teaching the game. The summit's recommendations ultimately led to fundamental changes in how players were trained.

Dryden urged for the end to persistent abuse of on-ice officials, or Canada would lose 10,000 referees each year. Hockey Canada started to educate on respect for game officials as a result of the summit. The NHL was also concerned that referee abuse led to decreasing numbers, and deterred those from becoming higher-level referees.

Nicholson contemplated arranging a summit every four years after the Olympics. The next summit arranged by Hockey Canada was the World Hockey Summit in 2010. In the eleven years from 1999 to 2010, Canada national teams had won five of six gold medals in ice hockey at Winter Olympics, and five of six World Juniors championships.
