= The Game (Dryden book) =

1983 book by Ken Dryden

- Author: Ken Dryden
- Language: English
- Genre: Non-fiction, memoir
- Publisher: Macmillan of Canada
- Publication date: 1983
- Publication place: Canada
- Media type: Print
- Pages: 308 p.p.
- ISBN: 978-0-771-59720-6
- Preceded by: Face-Off at the Summit
- Followed by: Home Game

The Game is a book written by ice hockey player Ken Dryden who played as a goaltender in the National Hockey League (NHL). Published in 1983, the book is a non-fiction account of the 1978–79 Montreal Canadiens, detailing the life of a professional athlete. The book describes the pressures of being a goaltender in the NHL, and gives readers a behind-the-scenes look at a team that would eventually win the 1979 Stanley Cup. Dryden writes about the life of an athlete, coping with the demands of a demanding sport and reconciling these pressures with life outside the arena.

== Reception ==
Ken Dryden's book The Game received praise from critics upon its publication. Mordecai Richler wrote "Dryden has written a very special book, possibly the best hockey book I have ever read. His affectionate yet realistic portrait of the players is unrivalled in hockey writing." Wrote noted sports columnist Scott Young: "A hockey book so rare that there is actually nothing to compare it to." The Game was nominated for a Governor General's Literary Award for Non-fiction in 1983

Since its publication its stature has continued to grow. Sports Illustrated named it in 2002 as the ninth best sports book of all time: "Hall of Fame goalie Dryden was always different. A Cornell grad, he led Montreal to six Stanley Cups, then at 26 sat out a year to prepare for the bar exam. His book is different too: a well-crafted account of his career combined with a meditation on hockey's special place in Canadian culture." The book review site The Pequod rated the book a 10.0 (out of 10.0) and said, “Dryden's book is so beautifully written, with such a wise and thoughtful voice, that it often rises to level of great literature.” Ian McGillis in the Montreal Gazette wrote "It's a book that made a huge splash on first publication in 1983 and has weathered the subsequent decades remarkably well, staying in print and picking up new readers far past the point where a book tied to a specific hockey season – 1978–79 – might be expected to. Its stature owes something to how clearly it stands out among sports books, but to call it the best hockey book ever, as it certainly is, still sounds faintly condescending. It’s a Canadian classic, period."
