= Game Change (Dryden book) =

2017 book by Ken Dryden

- First edition
- Author: Ken Dryden
- Language: English
- Genre: Non-fiction, memoir
- Publisher: McClelland & Stewart
- Publication date: October 17, 2017)
- Publication place: Canada
- Media type: Print (Hardcover)
- Pages: 357
- ISBN: 978-0-7710-2747-5
- Preceded by: Becoming Canadian

Game Change is the 5th book written by former ice hockey goaltender Ken Dryden. Published in 2017, the book is a non-fiction account of the life and death of Steve Montador and the future of hockey.

Following Montador's death it was discovered that he had chronic traumatic encephalopathy (CTE). Through the lens of Montador's death, Dryden connects the current game to the past while attempting to suggest the way forward for hockey in the future.

The Globe and Mail called it "a deep piece of investigative journalism." Booklist Online also gave it a favorable review, "Dryden’s book delivers a powerful statement about the danger of hockey as it is played today, all through a portrait of one player’s short, tragic life. An outstanding contribution to sports literature."

Following the release of the book Dryden met with NHL Commissioner Gary Bettman and presented him with the book. The book was a Canadian best seller.
