= Dave King (ice hockey) =

Canadian ice hockey coach (born 1947)

Dave King CM
- Born: December 22, 1947 (age 78) North Battleford, Saskatchewan, Canada
- Coached for: Calgary Flames; Columbus Blue Jackets; Billings Bighorns; Saskatchewan Huskies; Hamburg Freezers; Metallurg Magnitogorsk; Malmö Redhawks; Adler Mannheim; Lokomotiv Yaroslavl
- National team: Canada
- Coaching career: 1974–2017

W. David King CM (born December 22, 1947) is a Canadian former professional ice hockey coach. He coached professional teams in the National Hockey League (NHL), the Russian Super League, the Kontinental Hockey League, and the Deutsche Eishockey Liga, as well as junior and amateur teams in the Western Hockey League and in U Sports. Internationally, he coached the Canadian national team at the IIHF World Junior Championships and several Winter Olympics. He was made a Member of the Order of Canada (CM) in 1992, was inducted into the Canadian Olympic Hall of Fame in 1997, and was inducted into the IIHF Hall of Fame in 2001. In recognition of his contributions to the game with its national teams, Hockey Canada named him to the Order of Hockey in Canada in 2013.

== Early life and amateur coaching ==
King was born in North Battleford, Saskatchewan on December 22, 1947. He trained as a teacher at the University of Saskatchewan where he also played hockey with the Saskatchewan Huskies; he was the team's captain for the 1970–71 season. He spent several years teaching at Saskatoon's Aden Bowman Collegiate, where he also coached a variety of sports before deciding to focus on coaching hockey.

King's first full-time coaching job was as an assistant coach with the University of Saskatchewan in the 1972–73 season. He then coached the Billings Bighorns of the Western Hockey League before returning to Saskatchewan, winning three conference championships with the Huskies as head coach and being named the 1980 Canadian Interuniversity Athletics coach of the year. He led the Huskies to three straight national finals, with the team winning the CIAU national title in 1983. King's Huskies teams became known as the "Hustlin' Huskies" for their hard-working style of play. The captain of the national championship team was Willie Desjardins, who would himself go on to a long coaching career; in 2018, King would serve as an assistant to Desjardins with the Canadian national team at the Winter Olympics.

== Professional coaching ==
King was hired by the Calgary Flames in 1992 and coached the team for three seasons until 1995. He was an assistant coach with the Montreal Canadiens from 1997 to 1999 and then became the first coach of the expansion Columbus Blue Jackets ahead of their inaugural 2000–01 season. He was fired by the Blue Jackets on January 7, 2003, in the middle of the 2002–03 season, his and the team's third season. In 2009, the Phoenix Coyotes hired King as an assistant coach. At the end of the 2010–11 season, King became a development coach with the Coyotes.

Outside of the NHL, King coached European teams for several seasons after his time in Columbus, including the Hamburg Freezers and Adler Mannheim of the German Deutsche Eishockey Liga and the Malmö Redhawks of the Swedish Elite League. He also became the first North American to coach in Russia. He first coached Metallurg Magnitogorsk of the Russian Super League from 2005 to 2006, a team which included top NHL prospect Evgeni Malkin. King co-authored a 2007 book with sports journalist Eric Duhatschek entitled King of Russia about his first stint in the country. In early 2014, he returned to Russia to take over Lokomotiv Yaroslavl of the Kontinental Hockey League, a team that less than three years earlier had been devastated by a fatal plane crash. King joined the team with just four games remaining in the 2013–14 season. Lokomotiv secured a playoff spot by winning those four games, and then upset the heavily favoured Dynamo Moscow in the first round of the playoffs and SKA Saint Petersburg in the second round, before losing to Lev Praha in the third round. King returned to coach the team in the 2014–15 season.

== International coaching ==
King was the head coach of Canada's national junior team, and helped guide the team to a gold medal at the 1982 World Junior Championships and a bronze medal at the 1983 World Juniors. King was head coach of the Canadian national team at the 1984, 1988, and 1992 Winter Olympics, finishing fourth in 1984 and 1988, and winning a silver medal in 1992. He also coached the Canadian national team at five IIHF World Championships. In 1987 he coached Canada to victory at the Izvestia Cup tournament in Moscow, becoming the first Canadian team to defeat the Soviet national team in the USSR since the 1972 Summit Series.

King served as head coach for Team Canada during the 2016 Deutschland Cup. He was an as associate coach at the 2016 and 2017 Spengler Cup tournaments, helping Canada win the tournament both times. In 2017, King was named an assistant coach of Canada's men's team for the 2018 Winter Olympics, the first to not feature NHL players since 1994; Canada went on to win the bronze medal.

King spoke at the Open Ice Summit in 1999, and advocated for more time to practice skills compared to playing time. He compared the Canadian system, which prioritized physical size and introduced body contact at a young age, to the European system, which prioritized skill, practiced three times as much as the Canadian model, and did not have body contact in youth hockey.

== Honours ==
King was made a Member of the Order of Canada (CM) in 1992. He was inducted into the Canadian Olympic Hall of Fame in 1997, and the IIHF Hall of Fame in 2001. In recognition of his contributions to the game with the national teams, Hockey Canada named him to the Order of Hockey in Canada as part of its 2013 class.

In 2018, King was awarded an honorary doctorate by the University of Saskatchewan.

== NHL head coaching record ==
Team	Year	Regular season							Postseason
Team	Year	G	W	L	T	OTL	Pts	Division rank	Result
CGY	1992–93	84	43	30	11	-	97	2nd in Smythe	Lost in First round
CGY	1993–94	84	42	29	13	-	97	1st in Pacific	Lost in First round
CGY	1994–95	48	24	17	7	-	55	1st in Pacific	Lost in First round
CBJ	2000–01	82	28	39	9	6	71	5th in Central	Missed Playoffs
CBJ	2001–02	82	22	47	8	5	57	5th in Central	Missed Playoffs
CBJ	2002–03	40	14	20	4	2	(34)	5th in Central	(fired January 7, 2003)
Total		420	173	182	52	13			8-12 Playoff Record

Preceded by Guy Charron	Head coach of the Calgary Flames; 1992–95	Succeeded by Pierre Page
Preceded by Position created	Head coach of the Columbus Blue Jackets; 2000–03	Succeeded by Doug MacLean
