= Ken Dryden =

Canadian hockey player and politician (1947–2025)

The Honourable PC OC Ken Dryden
- Hockey Hall of Fame, 1983
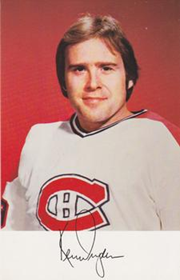
- Dryden with the Montreal Canadiens in 1978
- Born: August 8, 1947 Hamilton, Ontario, Canada
- Died: September 5, 2025 (aged 78) Toronto, Ontario, Canada
- Height: 6 ft 4 in (193 cm)
- Weight: 205 lb (93 kg; 14 st 9 lb)
- Position: Goaltender
- Caught: Left
- Played for: Montreal Canadiens
- National team: Canada
- NHL draft: 14th overall, 1964; Boston Bruins
- Playing career: 1970–1979

Minister of Social Development
- In office July 20, 2004 – February 5, 2006
- Prime Minister: Paul Martin
- Preceded by: Liza Frulla
- Succeeded by: Diane Finley

Member of Parliament for York Centre
- In office June 28, 2004 – May 1, 2011
- Preceded by: Art Eggleton
- Succeeded by: Mark Adler

Personal details
- Party: Liberal
- Spouse: Lynda Dryden
- Education: Cornell University (BA); McGill University (LLB)

Kenneth Wayne Dryden PC OC (August 8, 1947 – September 5, 2025) was a Canadian professional ice hockey player, politician, lawyer, businessman and author. He was a goaltender for the Montreal Canadiens of the National Hockey League (NHL) from 1971 to 1979, winning the Stanley Cup six times, the Vezina Trophy as the goaltender on the team allowing the fewest goals five times, and the Conn Smythe Trophy along with the Calder Memorial Trophy as the most valuable player of the playoffs and rookie of the year respectively over the course of his rookie campaign. He was elected as member of the Hockey Hall of Fame in 1983. Thereafter, Dryden served as a Liberal Member of Parliament from 2004 to 2011 and was appointed Minister of Social Development from 2004 to 2006 for which he was named an Officer of the Order of Canada. In 2017, the NHL commemorated him as one of the league's 100 Greatest Players. He received the Order of Hockey in Canada in 2020.

== Early life and education ==
Dryden was born in Hamilton, Ontario, to parents Murray Dryden and Margaret Adelia Campbell, and was raised in Islington, then a suburb of Toronto. He played with the Etobicoke Indians of the Metro Junior B Hockey League as well as the Humber Valley Packers of the Metro Toronto Hockey League.

On June 11, 1964, Dryden was drafted fourteenth overall by the Boston Bruins in the 1964 NHL amateur draft. Days later, on June 28, the Bruins traded Dryden, along with Alex Campbell, to the Montreal Canadiens in exchange for Paul Reid and Guy Allen. Dryden was told by his agent that he had been drafted by the Canadiens and did not find out until the mid-1970s that he had been drafted by the Bruins.

Rather than play for the Canadiens in 1964, Dryden pursued a Bachelor of Arts in History at Cornell University, where he also played collegiately until his graduation in 1969. He backstopped the Cornell Big Red to the 1967 NCAA championship and to three consecutive ECAC tournament championships, winning 76 of his 81 varsity starts. At Cornell, he was a member of the Quill and Dagger society and the Sigma Phi society. He also was a member of the Canada national team that participated at the 1969 World Championships tournament held in Stockholm.

Dryden's jersey number 1 was retired by the Cornell Big Red on February 25, 2010; along with Joe Nieuwendyk, he is one of two players to have their numbers retired by Cornell's hockey program.

== Playing career ==
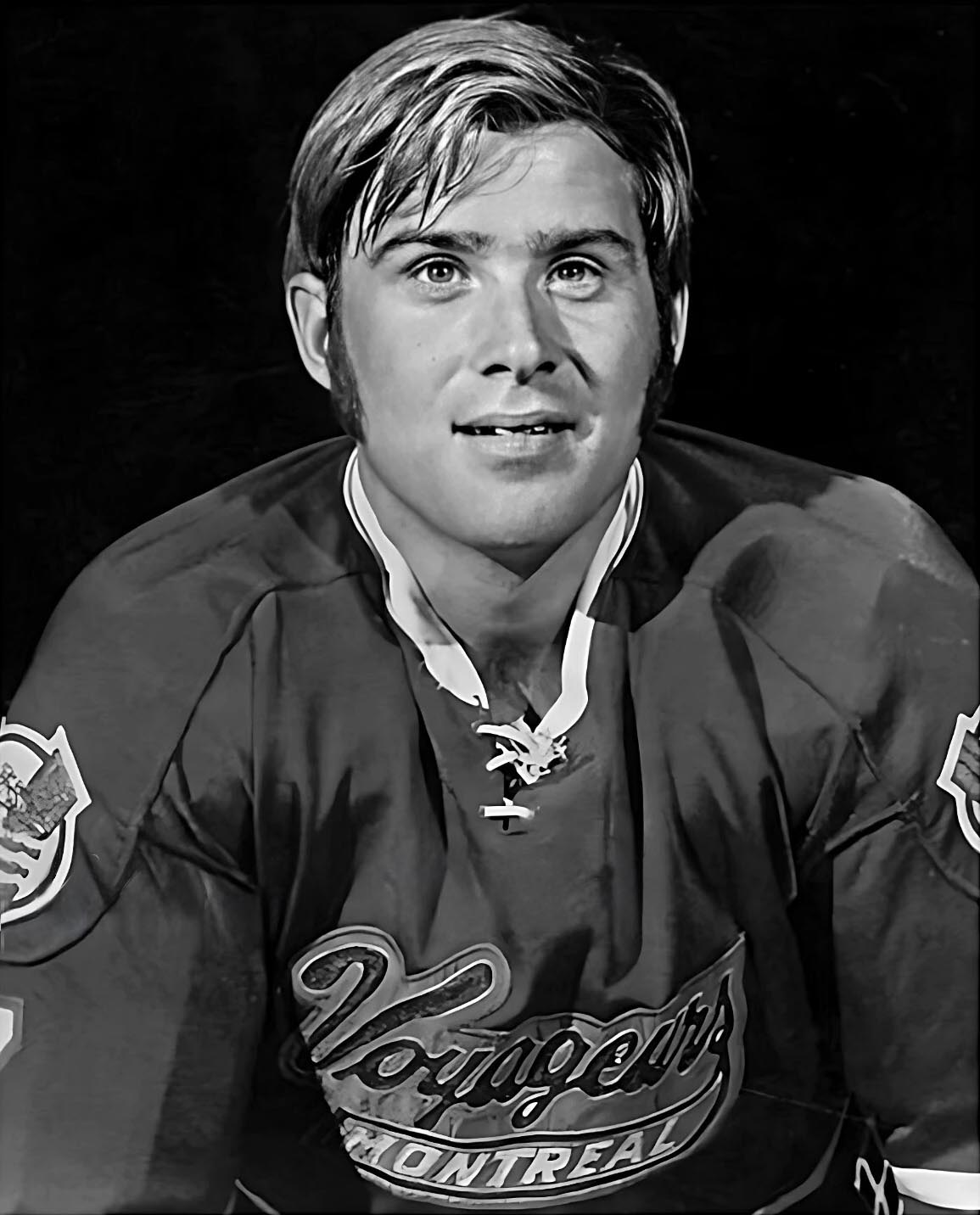
Dryden with the Montreal Voyageurs c. 1970

Dryden made his NHL debut on March 14, 1971, against the Pittsburgh Penguins at Civic Arena. The Canadiens won the game 5–1, with Dryden stopping 35 of 36 shots. He was called up from the minors late in the season and played only six regular season games, nonetheless posting an impressive 1.65 goals against average (GAA). This earned him the starting goaltending job for the playoffs ahead of veteran Rogie Vachon, and he helped the Canadiens to win the Stanley Cup. He also won the Conn Smythe Trophy as the most valuable player in the playoffs. He helped the Habs win the Stanley Cup five more times, in 1973, 1976, 1977, 1978, and 1979.

The following season, Dryden won the Calder Memorial Trophy as the rookie of the year having not been eligible the previous year due to not playing enough regular season games. With this, he is to date the only player in league history to win the Conn Smythe Trophy before winning the rookie of the year award as well as the only goaltender to capture both the Conn Smythe and the Stanley Cup before losing a regular season game. In the autumn of 1972, Dryden played for Canada in the 1972 Summit Series against the Soviet Union national team.

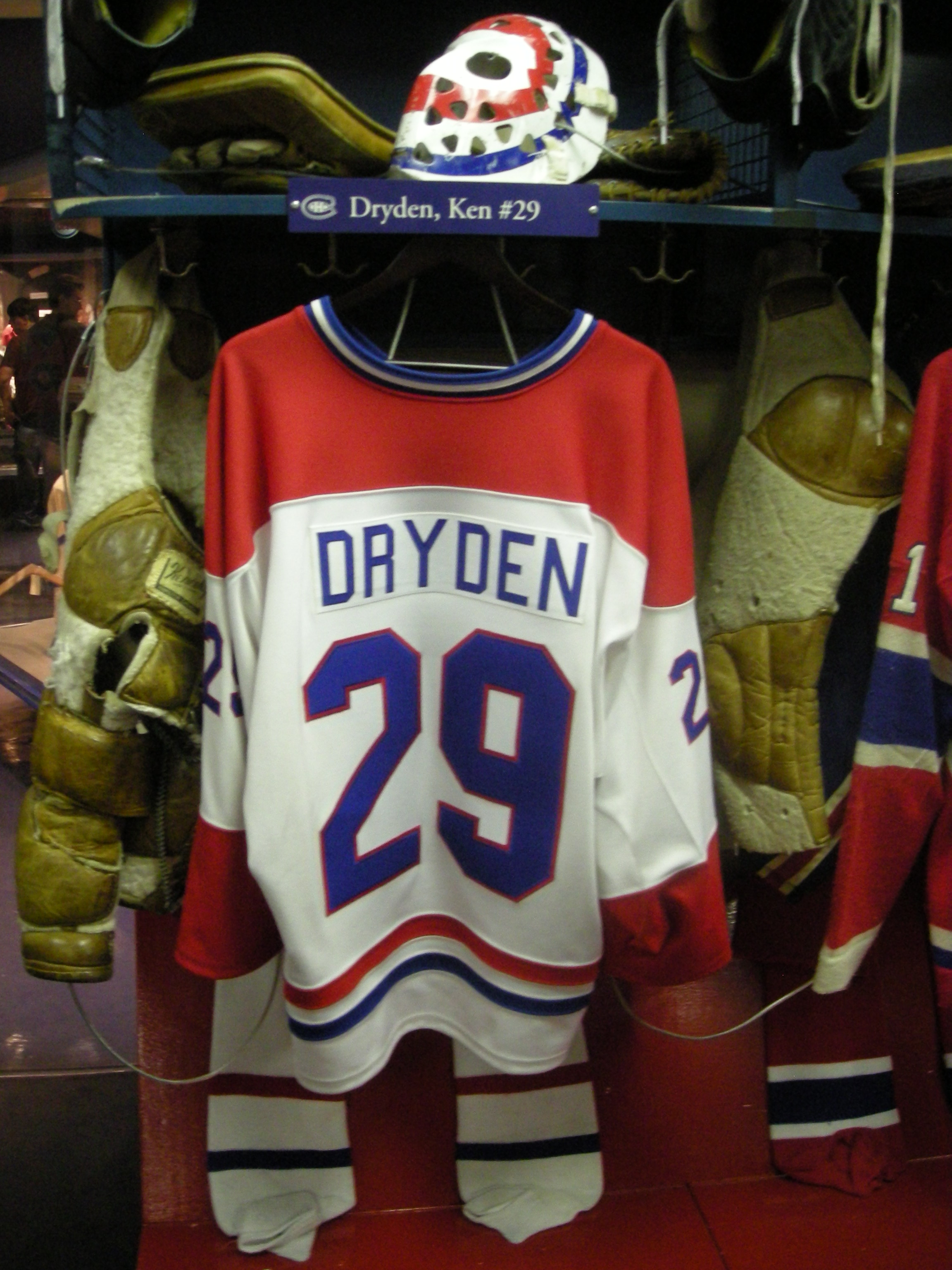
Replica Dryden jersey in the Canadiens locker room display at the Hockey Hall of Fame

Dryden played from 1971 to 1979, with a break during the entire 1973–74 season; he was unhappy with the contract that the Canadiens offered him, which he considered less than his market worth, given that he had won the Stanley Cup and Vezina Trophy. With this, he instead articled for a Toronto-based law firm in order to meet requirements for his Bachelor of Laws (LLB) degree received from McGill University in 1973. He announced on September 14, 1973, that he was joining Osler, Hoskin & Harcourt, earning $135 a week. During this time, Dryden also interned with Ralph Nader's Public Citizen organization. Inspired by Nader's call in Action for a Change for establishing Public Interest Research Groups, he tried to establish the Ontario Public Interest Research Group in the province of Ontario. Despite his absence, the Canadiens still had a good year, going 45–24–9, but lost in the first round of the playoffs to the New York Rangers in six games. The team allowed 56 more goals in the 1973–74 season than they had the year before with Dryden. He retired for the last time on July 9, 1979.

Compared to those of most other great hockey players, Dryden's NHL career was very short: just over seven full seasons. Thus, he did not amass record totals in most statistical categories. As he played all his years with a dynasty and retired before he passed his prime, his statistical percentages are unparalleled. His regular season totals include a 74.3 winning percentage, a 2.24 GAA, a .922 save percentage, along with 46 shutouts in just 397 NHL games. He won the Vezina Trophy five times which, at the time, was awarded to the goaltender on the team who allowed the fewest goals. He would also likewise be selected as a First Team All-Star in each of his Vezina-winning campaigns. In 1998, he was ranked number 25 on The Hockey News' list of the Top 100 NHL Players of All Time, a remarkable achievement for a player with a comparatively brief career.

At 6 ft 4 in (1.93 m), Dryden was so tall that when the puck was at the opposite end of the ice, he struck what became his trademark pose – leaning upon his stick. He was known as the "four-storey goalie," and was once referred to as "that thieving giraffe" by Boston Bruins superstar Phil Esposito, in reference to Dryden's skill and height.

Dryden was inducted into the Hockey Hall of Fame in 1983, as soon as he was eligible. His sweater number 29 was retired by the Canadiens on January 29, 2007. He was inducted into the Ontario Sports Hall of Fame in 2011.

== Post-playing career ==
=== Writing ===
Dryden wrote one book during his hockey career: Face-Off at the Summit. It was a diary about Canada's team in the 1972 Summit Series. The book has been out of print for many years.

After retiring from hockey Dryden wrote several more books. The Game (1983) was a commercial and critical success, and was nominated for a Governor General's Award in 1983. His next book, Home Game: Hockey and Life in Canada (1990), written with Roy MacGregor, was developed into an award-winning Canadian Broadcasting Corporation six-part documentary series for television. His fourth book was The Moved and the Shaken: The Story of One Man's Life (1993). His fifth book, In School: Our Kids, Our Teachers, Our Classrooms (1995), written with Roy MacGregor, was about Canada's educational system. Becoming Canada (2010) argued for a new definition of Canada and its unique place in the world.

In 2019, he published Scotty: A Hockey Life Like No Other, his biography of his Canadiens coach Scotty Bowman. Dryden says at the beginning that he 'needed to write this book,' because 'Scotty had lived a truly unique life. He has experienced almost everything in hockey, up close, for the best part of a century - and his is a life that no one else will live again. It's a life that had to be captured. And it needs to be captured now, because time is moving on.'

Feeling that Bowman was 'too practical and focused' to be a natural storyteller, Dryden instead asked Bowman to think like a coach and select the 8 greatest teams of all time (but only one per dynasty) and explain what he thought about them, how we coach against them but also what was happening in his life at that time and through that process, Bowman's story would be told.

=== Commentator ===
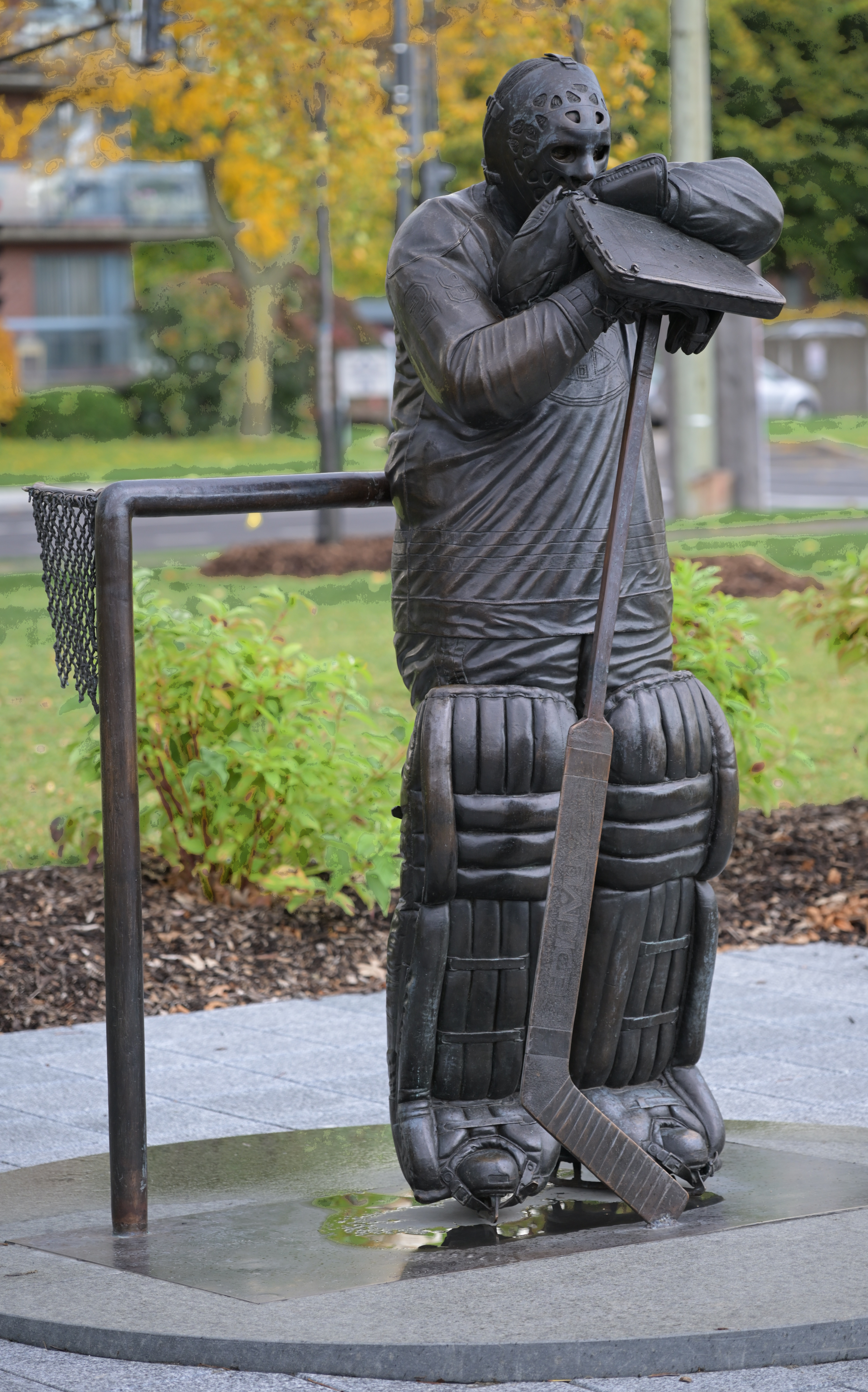
A statue of Ken Dryden in Saint-Laurent, Quebec featuring his signature resting position.

While Dryden was an articling student, he worked as a colour commentator for the Toronto Toros of the World Hockey Association during the 1973–74 season. He later worked as a television hockey commentator at the 1980, 1984 and 1988 Winter Olympics. He served as a colour commentator with play-by-play man Al Michaels for ABC's coverage of the "Miracle on Ice". Immediately before Mike Eruzione's game-winning goal for the US, Dryden expressed his concern that the team was "depending a little bit too much" on goaltender Jim Craig after Craig had just made "too many good saves".

=== Sports executive ===
In 1997, Dryden was hired as president of the Toronto Maple Leafs by minority owner Larry Tanenbaum. Pat Quinn became head coach in 1998, and there were reports that the two men had a frosty relationship. A few months after joining the Leafs, Quinn became general manager, a move thought by some to preempt Dryden from hiring former Canadiens teammate Bob Gainey.

Dryden spoke at the Open Ice Summit in 1999, to discuss improvements needed to ice hockey in Canada. He wanted delegates to accept that progress made at the lower levels and off the ice was important in achieving international results. He was cautious that change would come slowly and be costly, but felt the summit was an important step in making progress. He also urged for the end to persistent abuse of on-ice officials, or Canada would lose 10,000 referees each year. As a result of the summit, Hockey Canada started to educate on the importance of respect for game officials.

On August 29, 2003, with the hiring of John Ferguson, Jr. as general manager, there was a major management shakeup. Majority owner Steve Stavro was bought out by the Ontario Teachers' Pension Plan and he stepped down as chairman in favour of Larry Tanenbaum. Quinn continued as head coach. Dryden's position was abolished, in favour of having both the Leafs' and Raptors' managers reporting directly to MLSE president and CEO Richard Peddie. Dryden was shuffled to the less important role of vice-chairman and given a spot on MLSE's board of directors. This was described by commentators as "sitting outside the loop", as Dryden did not report directly to Leafs ownership. He stayed on until 2004 when he resigned to enter politics.

=== Teaching ===
Dryden was selected to present the Charles R. Bronfman Lecture in Canadian Studies at the University of Ottawa in 2000. His lecture, entitled Finding a Way: Legacy for the Past, Recipe for the Future, was subsequently published by the University of Ottawa Press.

In January 2012, Dryden was appointed a "Special Visitor" at his alma mater McGill University's Institute for the Study of Canada. He taught a Canadian studies course entitled "Thinking the Future to Make the Future," which focused on issues facing Canada in the future and how to tackle these issues.

== Political career ==
Dryden joined the Liberal Party of Canada and ran for the House of Commons in the 2004 federal election. He was selected by party leader and Prime Minister Paul Martin as a "star candidate" in the Toronto riding of York Centre, then considered a safe Liberal riding. He had previously attended the 1987 New Democratic Party federal convention, under the leadership of Ed Broadbent.

Dryden was elected by a margin of over 11,000 votes. He was named to Cabinet as Minister of Social Development. He made headlines on February 16, 2005, as the target of a remark by Conservative Member of Parliament Rona Ambrose who said about Dryden, "working women want to make their own choices, we don't need old white guys telling us what to do." Ambrose made the remarks after Dryden commented on a poll that analyzed child care choices by Canadian families. Dryden won generally favourable reviews for his performance in Cabinet.

Dryden was re-elected in the 2006 federal election, while the Liberals were defeated and Paul Martin resigned the party leadership. Interim party and opposition leader Bill Graham named Dryden to his shadow cabinet as health critic.

Dryden's margin of victory in York Centre dwindled in the 2006 and 2008 elections. In the 2011 federal election, he focused his efforts on his own re-election instead of campaigning for other candidates as he did in the past, and he received a visit from former Prime Minister Jean Chrétien. Still, Dryden lost his seat to Conservative candidate Mark Adler by nearly 6,000 votes.

=== 2006 leadership campaign ===
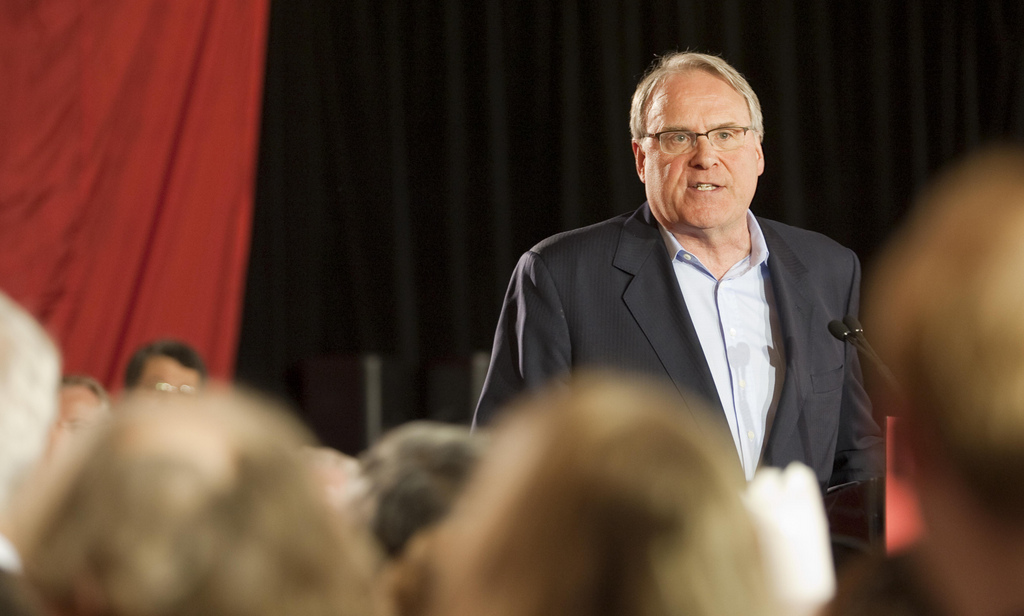
Ken Dryden at the Rise Up for Canada Rally in April 2011

On April 28, 2006, Dryden announced that he would run for the leadership of the Liberal Party of Canada, which would be choosing a successor to Paul Martin at a convention in Montreal on December 2, 2006.

A poll found that Dryden's potential pool of support exceeded that of his opponents, due mainly to his former NHL career. His fundraising fell well below that of top leadership contenders (Michael Ignatieff, Gerard Kennedy, Stéphane Dion and Bob Rae). A variety of media pundits criticized his ponderous speaking style and limited French. Supporters argued that few people were strongly opposed to him and that if he ran he could attract more support on later ballots as a consensus candidate.

At the convention, Dryden came in fifth place on the first ballot with 238 delegates, 4.9% of the vote. On the second ballot, he came in last place with 219 votes (4.7%) and was eliminated. He initially threw his support to Bob Rae, but after Rae was eliminated in the third ballot and released all of his delegates, Dryden endorsed Stéphane Dion, who went on to win the leadership.

According to Elections Canada filings, as of 2013 Dryden's campaign still owed $225,000.

== Personal life and death ==
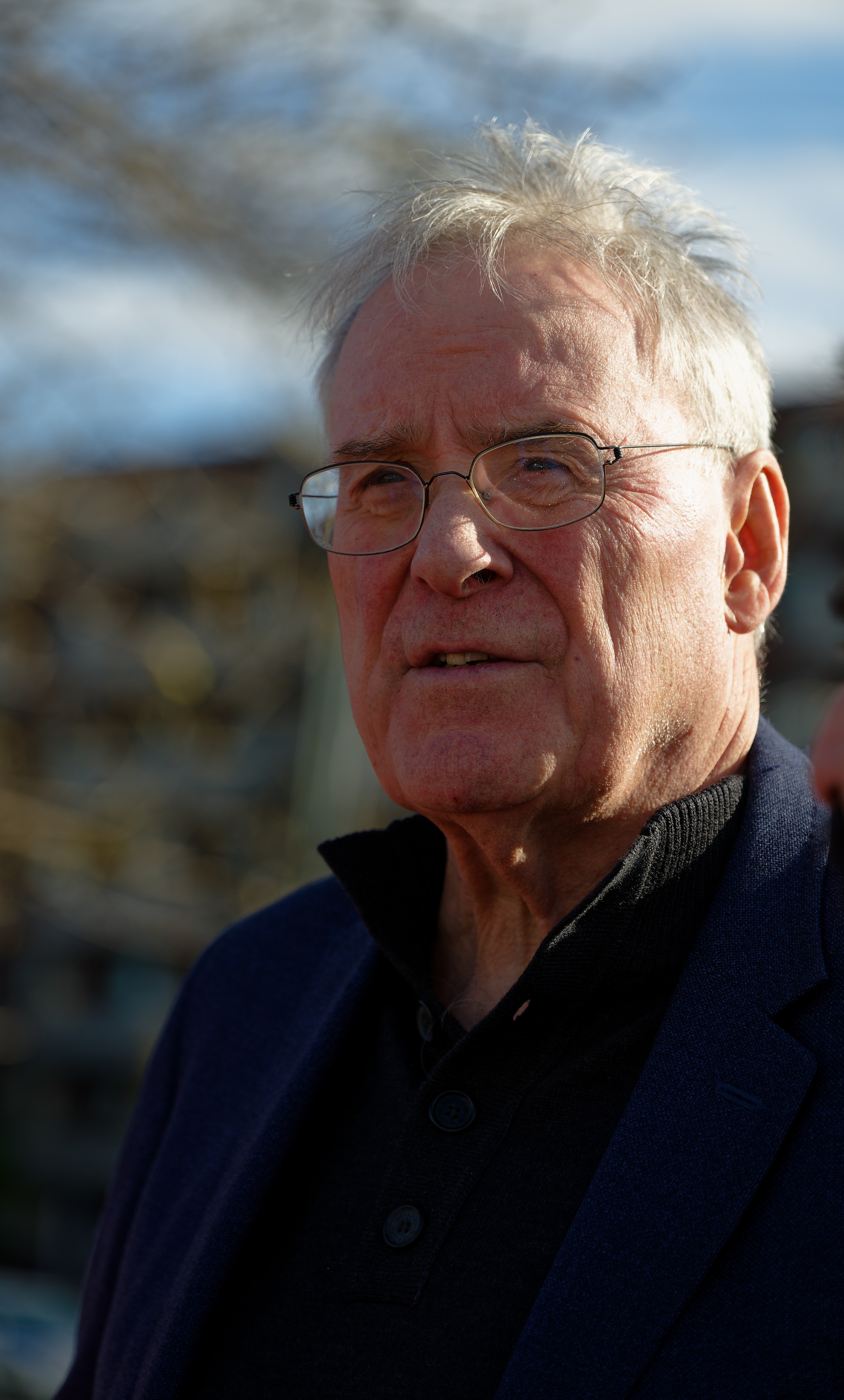
Dryden in October 2023

Dryden and his wife Lynda had two children and four grandchildren. He was a first cousin, twice removed, of Murray Murdoch, another former NHL player and a longtime coach of the Yale Bulldogs hockey team, and Andrew Dryden Blair, who played on the 1931–32 Leafs Stanley Cup winning team. His older brother, Dave, also played in the NHL and the World Hockey Association (WHA) as a goaltender from 1961 to 1980. On March 20, 1971, he played in a home game against his brother who was a backup goaltender at the time for the Buffalo Sabres; the game ended with the two skating to center ice and shaking hands. The siblings would face each other eight times in total (six games in the regular season and two in the playoffs). He also had a sister, Judy, who worked as a nurse.

Dryden's daughter-in-law Tammy Lee Shewchuk won a gold medal as a member of Canada's national team at the 2002 Winter Olympics, and her US-born son Hunter Dryden (Ken's grandson) signed with the Victoria Grizzlies junior hockey team in July 2026.

On September 5, 2025, Dryden died from cancer in Toronto at the age of 78.

== Career statistics ==
=== Regular season and playoffs ===
			Regular season									Playoffs
Season	Team	League	GP	W	L	T	MIN	GA	SO	GAA	SV%	GP	W	L	MIN	GA	SO	GAA	SV%
1963–64	Humber Valley Packers	MTHL	—	—	—	—	—	—	—	—	—	—	—	—	—	—	—	—	—
1964–65	Etobicoke Indians	MetJHL	—	—	—	—	—	—	—	—	—	—	—	—	—	—	—	—	—
1966–67	Cornell University	ECAC	27	26	0	1	1,646	40	4	1.46	.945	—	—	—	—	—	—	—	—
1967–68	Cornell University	ECAC	29	25	2	0	1,620	41	6	1.52	.938	—	—	—	—	—	—	—	—
1968–69	Cornell University	ECAC	27	25	2	0	1,578	47	3	1.79	.936	—	—	—	—	—	—	—	—
1970–71	Montreal Voyageurs	AHL	33	16	7	8	1,899	84	3	2.68	—	—	—	—	—	—	—	—	—
1970–71	Montreal Canadiens	NHL	6	6	0	0	327	9	0	1.65	.957	20	12	8	1,221	61	0	3.00	.914
1971–72	Montreal Canadiens	NHL	64	39	8	15	3,800	142	8	2.24	.930	6	2	4	360	17	0	2.83	.911
1972–73	Montreal Canadiens	NHL	54	33	7	13	3,165	119	6	2.26	.926	17	12	5	1,039	50	1	2.89	.908
1974–75	Montreal Canadiens	NHL	56	30	9	16	3,320	149	4	2.69	.906	11	6	5	688	29	2	2.53	.916
1975–76	Montreal Canadiens	NHL	62	42	10	8	3,580	121	8	2.03	.927	13	12	1	780	25	1	1.92	.929
1976–77	Montreal Canadiens	NHL	56	41	6	8	3,275	117	10	2.14	.920	14	12	2	849	22	4	1.55	.932
1977–78	Montreal Canadiens	NHL	52	37	7	7	3,071	105	5	2.05	.921	15	12	3	919	29	2	1.89	.920
1978–79	Montreal Canadiens	NHL	47	30	10	7	2,814	108	5	2.30	.909	16	12	4	990	41	0	2.48	.900
NHL totals			397	258	57	74	23,330	870	46	2.24	.922	112	80	32	6,846	274	10	2.40	.915

=== International ===
Year	Team	Event	GP	W	L	T	MIN	GA	SO	GAA
1969	Canada	WC	2	1	1	0	120	4	1	2.00
1972	Canada	SS	4	2	2	0	240	19	0	4.75
Senior totals			6	3	3	0	360	23	1	3.83

"Dryden's stats". The Goaltender Home Page.

== Awards and honours ==
Dryden's hockey awards and honours include:

Award	Year	Remark
College
All-ECAC First Team	1966–67, 1967–68, 1968–69	
AHCA East All-American	1966–67, 1967–68, 1968–69	
ECAC All-Tournament First Team	1967, 1968, 1969	
NCAA All-Tournament First Team	1967	
NCAA All-Tournament Second Team	1968, 1969	
No. 1 jersey retired by the Cornell Big Red (Note: One of only two players to have his number retired by the Cornell hockey program, the other being Joe Nieuwendyk.)	February 25, 2010	
National Hockey League
Conn Smythe Trophy winner	1971	
Calder Memorial Trophy winner	1972	
Vezina Trophy winner	1973, 1976, 1977, 1978, 1979 (Note: Shared with Michel Larocque in 1977, 1978 and 1979.)	
Stanley Cup champion	1971, 1973, 1976, 1977, 1978, 1979	
NHL All-Star Game participant	1972, 1975, 1976, 1977, 1978	
Selected to NHL First All-Star Team	1973, 1976, 1977, 1978, 1979	
Selected to NHL Second All-Star Team	1972	
Named to league's list of 100 Greatest NHL Players	2017	
Montreal Canadiens
No. 29 jersey retired by the franchise	January 29, 2007	
Miscellaneous
Inducted into the Hockey Hall of Fame	1983	
No. 25 on The Hockey News' list of the Top 100 NHL Players of All Time	1998	
Inducted into the Ontario Sports Hall of Fame	2011	
Appointed as an Officer of the Order of Canada	2012	
Recipient of the Order of Hockey in Canada	2020	

He received honorary doctoral degrees from several universities, including:

Honorary degree	University	Year	Remark
Honorary LLD degree	University of British Columbia	1992	
Honorary LLD degree	York University	1996	
Honorary LLD degree	University of Windsor	1997	
Honorary DUniv degree	University of Ottawa	2000	
Honorary LLD degree	McMaster University	2003	
Honorary DCL degree	Saint Mary's University	2004	
Honorary LLD degree	Ryerson University	2013	
Honorary DLitt degree	University of Winnipeg	2013	
Honorary DLitt degree	McGill University	2018	

== Bibliography ==
=== Non-fiction ===
- Face-off at the Summit (with Mark Mulvoy, 1973)
- The Game (1983)
- Home Game: Hockey and Life in Canada (with Roy MacGregor, 1990)
- The Moved and the Shaken (1993)
- In School: Our Kids, Our Teachers, Our Classrooms (with Roy MacGregor, 1995)
- Becoming Canada (2010)
- Game Change (2017)
- Scotty: A Hockey Life Like No Other (2019)
- The Series: What I Remember, What It Felt Like, What It Feels Like Now (2022)
- The Class: A Memoir of a Time, a Place, and Us (2023)

== Notes ==
27th Canadian Ministry (2003–2006) – Cabinet of Paul Martin
Cabinet post (1)
Predecessor	Office	Successor
Liza Frulla	Minister of Social Development; 2004–2006	position abolished
Awards and achievements
Preceded by Doug Ferguson	ECAC Hockey Most Outstanding Player in Tournament; 1968, 1969	Succeeded by Bruce Bullock
Preceded by Wayne Small	ECAC Hockey Player of the Year; 1968–69	Succeeded by Tim Sheehy
Preceded by Gilbert Perreault	Winner of the Calder Memorial Trophy; 1972	Succeeded by Steve Vickers
Preceded by Bobby Orr	Winner of the Conn Smythe Trophy; 1971	Succeeded by Bobby Orr
Preceded by Tony Esposito	Winner of the Vezina Trophy; 1973	Succeeded by Tony Esposito and Bernie Parent
Preceded by Bernie Parent	Winner of the Vezina Trophy; 1976, 1977, 1978, 1979; With: Michel Larocque (1977, 1978, 1979)	Succeeded by Don Edwards and Bob Sauvé
Sporting positions
Preceded by Bob Pulford	NHLPA president 1972–74	Succeeded by Pit Martin
Preceded by Cliff Fletcher	General manager of the Toronto Maple Leafs; 1997–99	Succeeded by Pat Quinn
