= Bill Daly =

Ice hockey executive

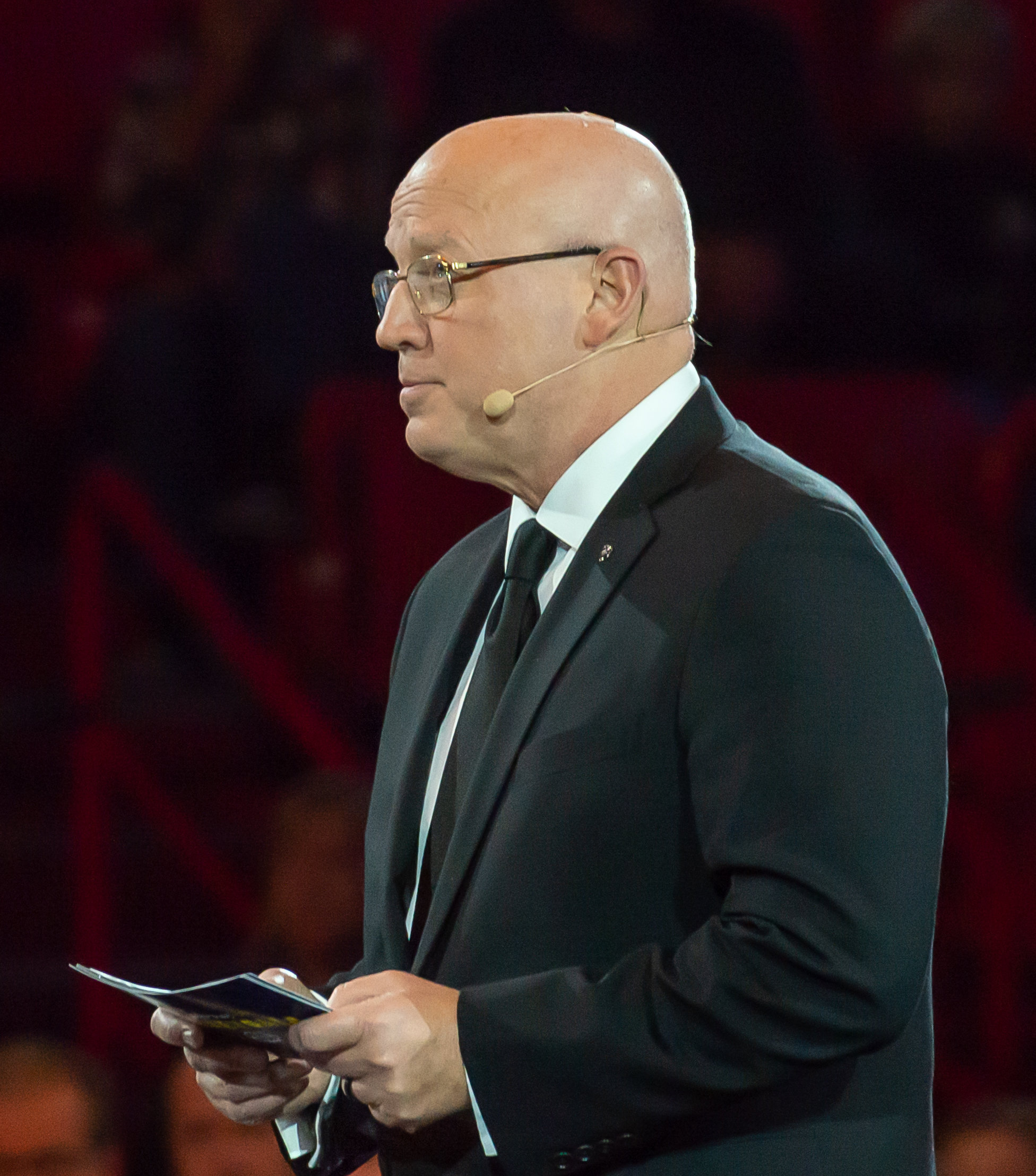
- Born: William Lawrence Daly III; May 1, 1964 (age 62); Kinnelon, New Jersey, U.S.
- Occupations: NHL deputy commissioner, attorney
- Years active: 2005–present
- Employer: National Hockey League
- Predecessor: None
- Awards: Lester Patrick Trophy, 2014

William Lawrence Daly III (born May 1, 1964) is an American attorney and the current deputy commissioner and chief legal officer of the National Hockey League (NHL) under Commissioner Gary Bettman. He is also a Hockey Hall of Fame board member and former NHL vice president and chief legal officer. Before joining the NHL front office he worked for the New York law firm of Skadden, Arps, Slate, Meagher & Flom, LLP. He received his bachelor's degree from Dartmouth College and his J.D. degree from New York University School of Law.

== Education and family ==
Daly is the son of William L. Daly Jr. and Donna (née Woodhead) Daly. His mother was from Saskatoon, Saskatchewan and his grandfather was a diver who is a member of the Saskatoon Sports Hall of Fame.

He grew up in Kinnelon, New Jersey with his parents and older sister, Denise. He majored in government, with an additional concentration in history, at Dartmouth College, where he also played varsity football. He graduated from Dartmouth in 1986 and went on to obtain his J.D. degree from NYU School of Law (1990).

Daly lives in Bethesda, Maryland, with his wife and has 3 children.

== Career ==
=== Major milestones ===
In 1996, Bill Daly was hired by the National Hockey League (NHL) as senior vice president of legal affairs. Prior to joining the NHL, Daly was an attorney with the law firm of Skadden, Arps, Slate, Meagher & Flom for six years. In 2000, Daly began assuming responsibility for all of the NHL's international transactions with the league's new focus on international affairs. Shortly after, in 2001, Daly established an agreement between the NHL and International Ice Hockey Federation (IIHF) that stated a number of guidelines for international player relations including the age at which teams can sign European prospects, how long they can keep players, and compensation for European clubs for the loss of their star players.

Daly was the NHL's main negotiator during collective bargaining with NHL players in the 2004-05 NHL lock out, that ended in July 2005 when the NHLPA approved the new collective-bargaining agreement (CBA) with a 464–68 vote. The same year, Daly helped negotiate the two-year, $135 million deal with Comcast for the league's cable broadcasting rights.

In 2005, Daly was named the first NHL deputy commissioner. In 2014, he received the Lester Patrick Trophy along with Paul Holmgren.

Daly spoke at the World Hockey Summit in 2010, and stated a desire to increase the number of NHL games in Europe and to market its brands and most popular teams to Europeans.

Daly played a key role in two of the most impactful commercial contracts with TV rightsholders in NHL history. In 2011, he led negotiations on the 10-year U.S. national rights agreement with NBC Sports Group, delivering NHL regular season games regularly to U.S. fans through over-the-air, NBC Sports Network, and NBC's newly created sports cable channel. The deal also provided coverage of almost every Stanley Cup Final game for the first time. In 2013, he again was the lead negotiator in the 12-year Canadian national broadcast and new media deal with Rogers Communications (Rogers Sportsnet).

In 2017, Daly reinvigorated the NHL's international strategy that brought NHL teams to China for the first-ever preseason games in Beijing and Shanghai. It also reintroduced games in Europe, bringing regular season games to Sweden for the first time since 2011.

=== Responsibilities ===
Daly oversees the NHL's relationship - including negotiating and administering necessary working agreements - with the NHL Alumni Association, American Hockey League, Canadian Hockey League, Hockey Canada and USA Hockey. He is the President of the NHL Foundation, the organization that administers charitable dollars and initiatives for the NHL and its teams. He is a board member for the NHL Players' Emergency Assistance Fund. He is on the Board of Directors, as an NHL representative, for the Hockey Hall of Fame and USA Hockey.

As deputy commissioner, Daly currently holds the duty of presenting the Prince of Wales Trophy and the Clarence S. Campbell Bowl to the conference playoff champions at the end of each conference finals series. He also holds the duty of presenting the Presidents' Trophy to the team with the NHL's best regular season record, as well as hosting the NHL draft lottery. At the conclusion of the 2022 Stanley Cup Final, he presented the Conn Smythe Trophy to defenseman Cale Makar, and the Stanley Cup to the championship team, the Colorado Avalanche as Commissioner Bettman was unable to do so as a result of being in COVID protocol.

He oversees the NHL's participation in all international hockey competitions, including the Olympics, the World Cup of Hockey, the IIHF World Hockey Championships, NHL Global Series and NHL China Games.

Outside of his responsibilities with the NHL, Daly has served as a board member for the Sports Lawyers Association. He has served on boards the Sports Development Corporation of the City of New York, and the Sports Law and Antitrust Law Committees of the Association of the Bar of the City of New York.

== Honors ==
In 2013, Bill Daly was selected as one of Legal 500's Corporate Counsel 100. In 2014, he was awarded Legal 500's Individual of the Year: Sport.

In 2014, Daly received the Lester Patrick Trophy, given to people who advance the sport of hockey in America.

Preceded by New creation	National Hockey League; Deputy Commissioner; 2005–present	Incumbent
