= 1967–68 Denver Pioneers men's ice hockey season =

Collegiate team season

National champion WCHA, champion WCHA Tournament, co-champion NCAA Tournament, champion
- Conference: 1st WCHA
- Home ice: DU Arena

Record
- Overall: 28–5–1
- Conference: 15–3–0
- Home: 19–0–0
- Road: 6–3–0
- Neutral: 3–2–1

Coaches and captains
- Head coach: Murray Armstrong
- Captain(s): Jim Wiste; Cliff Koroll

The 1967–68 Denver Pioneers men's ice hockey team represented University of Denver in college ice hockey. In its 12th year under head coach Murray Armstrong the team compiled a 28–5–1 record and reached the NCAA tournament for the seventh time. The Pioneers defeated North Dakota 4–0 in the championship game at the Duluth Arena Auditorium in Duluth, Minnesota, the third championship meeting between he two teams. Gerry Powers recorded the first shutout in the championship game and tied the record for lowest tournament goals against average (0.50).

== Season ==
Denver opened their season looking for revenge against North Dakota who had ended their campaign the year before. After earning a split on the road the Pioneers went east, winning a game against Minnesota–Duluth before continuing onto Houghton to take on perennial power Michigan Tech. The Huskies stymied Denver in both games, holding the Pioneers to single goal in each and putting Denver under .500 both overall and in conference. Denver returned home and began to climb out the hole the following week with a pair of wins over Michigan followed by an easy win over NAIA Bemidji State.

Denver spent their winter holiday playing in the Broadmoor World Tournament against four different national teams who were gearing up for the 1968 Winter Olympics. Denver went 1–2–1 in the series but acquitted themselves well against strong competition. The experience against the national teams helped the Pioneers go on a streak unparalleled in the history of the program. Denver won two games against the visiting Alberta Golden Bears before returning to their conference schedule and began to run roughshod over the opposition. Denver's offence, which had played well over the first part of the season, exploded after the new year and would score no fewer than 3 goals in their remaining 22 contests. The defense too buckled down and the Gerry Powers would only surrender more than three goals once in their remaining contests.

Denver would spend the final five weeks of the regular season at home and use that to their advantage by winning 17 straight games to enter the WCHA playoffs as the top seed, having defeated North Dakota and Michigan Tech by a combined 27–6 to guarantee their WCHA championship. Denver opened the conference tournament at home against UMD and dispatched the bulldogs 11–4 before hosting Minnesota in the second round. This was the first meeting between the two all season due to the Gopher's continued refusal to play Denver because of their recruiting conflict but the lack of familiarity didn't hamper Denver in the slightest and the Pioneers won the series 16–3.

With another WCHA championship under their belt Denver was given the top western seed in the 1968 NCAA Tournament and opened against Boston College at the Duluth Arena Auditorium. Powers showed up to play in the National Tournament and held BC to a single goal, ensuring that Denver's 4 goals would send the program to its 6th title game. In the final Denver met North Dakota once more and two western powers battled for the championship. Powers and his counterpart Mike Curran both kept the game scoreless through two periods of play but Bob Trembecky broke the tie with a power play marker early in the third. Denver kept its attack going, firing a total of 14 shots in the final frame with three more finding the back of the net, while North Dakota faltered and was unable to score. Denver's 4–0 win was their fourth championship and the first time that any team was shutout in the title game. The win was also Denver 22nd straight victory, a program record both overall and for one season.

For tying the NCAA record by allowing only 1 goal in the tournament, Gerry Powers won the tournament MOP and was named to the All-Tournament first team along with Keith Magnuson and Trembecky. Tim Gould, Jim Wiste and Tom Gilmore made the second team. Magnuson and Wiste were named to the AHCA All-American West Team and the All-WCHA First Team while Powers and Cliff Koroll made the All-WCHA Second Team. Magnuson was named as the WCHA Most Valuable Player while Murray Armstrong won his second WCHA Coach of the Year award.

== Standings ==
1967–68 Western Collegiate Hockey Association standings
	Conference							Overall					
	GP	W	L	T	PCT	GF	GA	GP	W	L	T	GF	GA
Denver†*	18	15	3	0	.833	84	32	34	28	5	1	183	65
Michigan Tech	20	15	5	0	.750	76	47	32	22	9	1	131	82
North Dakota*	22	13	8	1	.614	78	57	33	20	10	3	113	80
Michigan	18	11	7	0	.611	83	60	27	18	9	0	152	84
Minnesota	22	13	9	0	.591	98	71	31	19	12	0	132	109
Michigan State	20	6	13	1	.325	57	82	29	11	16	2	92	111
Colorado College	20	4	16	0	.200	40	106	29	9	20	0	84	108
Minnesota-Duluth	24	4	20	0	.167	54	109	28	5	23	0	71	144
Championship: North Dakota, Denver † indicates conference regular season champion * indicates conference tournament champion

== Schedule ==
Date	Opponent^{#}	Rank^{#}	Site	Result	Record
Exhibition
November 10	vs. DU Hilltoppers*		DU Arena • Denver, Colorado	W 11–1	
November 11	vs. DU Hilltoppers*		DU Arena • Denver, Colorado	W 11–2	
Regular Season
November 17	at North Dakota		Winter Sports Building • Grand Forks, North Dakota	W 5–1	1–0 (1–0)
November 18	at North Dakota		Winter Sports Building • Grand Forks, North Dakota	L 1–3	1–1 (1–1)
November 20	at Minnesota–Duluth		Duluth Arena Auditorium • Duluth, Minnesota	W 6–1	2–1 (2–1)
December 1	at Michigan Tech		Dee Stadium • Houghton, Michigan	L 1–6	2–2 (2–2)
December 2	at Michigan Tech		Dee Stadium • Houghton, Michigan	L 1–4	2–3 (2–3)
December 8	vs. Michigan		DU Arena • Denver, Colorado	W 5–2	3–3 (3–3)
December 9	vs. Michigan		DU Arena • Denver, Colorado	W 2–1 ^{OT}	4–3 (4–3)
December 16	vs. Bemidji State*		DU Arena • Denver, Colorado	W 12–0	5–3 (4–3)
December 26	vs. Finnish National Team*		Broadmoor World Arena • Colorado Springs, Colorado (Broadmoor World Tournament)	T 2–2	5–3–1 (4–3)
December 28	vs. US National Team*		Broadmoor World Arena • Colorado Springs, Colorado (Broadmoor World Tournament)	L 4–5	5–4–1 (4–3)
December 29	vs. Italian National Team*		Broadmoor World Arena • Colorado Springs, Colorado (Broadmoor World Tournament)	W 5–2	6–4–1 (4–3)
December 30	vs. Soviet National Team*		Broadmoor World Arena • Colorado Springs, Colorado (Broadmoor World Tournament)	L 1–8	6–5–1 (4–3)
January 5	vs. Alberta*		DU Arena • Denver, Colorado	W 4–2	7–5–1 (4–3)
January 6	vs. Alberta*		DU Arena • Denver, Colorado	W 8–0	8–5–1 (4–3)
January 12	at Michigan State		Demonstration Hall • East Lansing, Michigan	W 3–2	9–5–1 (5–3)
January 13	at Michigan State		Demonstration Hall • East Lansing, Michigan	W 3–1	10–5–1 (6–3)
January 15	at Minnesota–Duluth		Duluth Arena Auditorium • Duluth, Minnesota	W 5–1	11–5–1 (7–3)
January 19	vs. Colorado College		DU Arena • Denver, Colorado	W 3–1	12–5–1 (8–3)
January 20	at Colorado College		Broadmoor World Arena • Colorado Springs, Colorado	W 6–0	13–5–1 (9–3)
January 26	at Minnesota Nationals*		DU Arena • Denver, Colorado	W 5–2	14–5–1 (9–3)
January 27	at Minnesota Nationals*		DU Arena • Denver, Colorado	W 10–3	15–5–1 (9–3)
January 31	vs. Wisconsin*		DU Arena • Denver, Colorado	W 7–1	16–5–1 (9–3)
February 9	vs. Minnesota–Duluth		DU Arena • Denver, Colorado	W 10–2	17–5–1 (10–3)
February 10	vs. Minnesota–Duluth		DU Arena • Denver, Colorado	W 6–1	18–5–1 (11–3)
February 16	vs. North Dakota		DU Arena • Denver, Colorado	W 7–0	19–5–1 (12–3)
February 17	vs. North Dakota		DU Arena • Denver, Colorado	W 8–2	20–5–1 (13–3)
February 23	vs. Michigan Tech		DU Arena • Denver, Colorado	W 7–2	21–5–1 (14–3)
February 26	vs. Michigan Tech		DU Arena • Denver, Colorado	W 5–2	22–5–1 (15–3)
March 1	vs. Saskatchewan*		DU Arena • Denver, Colorado	W 6–0	23–5–1 (15–3)
WCHA Tournament
March 5	vs. Minnesota–Duluth*		DU Arena • Denver, Colorado (WCHA First Round)	W 11–4	24–5–1 (15–3)
March 8	vs. Minnesota*		DU Arena • Denver, Colorado (WCHA Second Round Game 1)	W 9–0	25–5–1 (15–3)
March 9	vs. Minnesota*		DU Arena • Denver, Colorado (WCHA Second Round Game 2)	W 7–3	26–5–1 (15–3)
NCAA Tournament
March 14	vs. Boston College*		Duluth Arena Auditorium • Duluth, Minnesota (National Semifinal)	W 4–1	27–5–1 (15–3)
March 16	vs. North Dakota*		Duluth Arena Auditorium • Duluth, Minnesota (National championship)	W 4–0	28–5–1 (15–3)
*Non-conference game. ^{#}Rankings from USCHO.com Poll. Source:

== Roster and scoring statistics ==
No.	Name	Year	Position	Hometown	S/P/C	Games	Goals	Assists	Points	PIM
14	Jim Wiste	Senior	C	Moose Jaw, SK	(Saskatchewan)	34	21	36	57	25
15	Bob Trembecky	Junior	C	Drumheller, AB	(Alberta)	29	24	30	54	-
17	Craig Patrick	Sophomore	RW	Detroit, MI	(Michigan)	34	23	26	49	12
8	Tom Miller	Junior	F	Kitchener, ON	(Ontario)	34	20	27	47	16
10	Cliff Koroll	Senior	RW	Canora, SK	(Saskatchewan)	34	18	22	40	55
16	Jim Shires	Senior	LW	Edmonton, AB	(Alberta)	34	15	23	38	43
12	Tom Gilmore	Sophomore	F	Flin Flon, MB	(Manitoba)	–	8	20	28	-
9	Al Genovy	Sophomore	C	Flin Flon, MB	(Manitoba)	–	12	11	23	-
3	Tim Gould	Junior	D	Saskatoon, SK	(Saskatchewan)	34	4	18	22	56
2	Keith Magnuson	Junior	D	Saskatoon, SK	(Saskatchewan)	34	5	15	20	59
13	Don Thiessen	Sophomore	F	Saskatoon, SK	(Saskatchewan)	–	4	6	10	-
11	Steve Keeler	Sophomore	RW	Toronto, ON	(Ontario)	5	0	0	0	7
4	Randy Ward	Junior	D	Calgary, AB	(Alberta)	22	6	–	–	–
6	Dale Zeman	Junior	D	Saskatoon, SK	(Saskatchewan)	–	0	–	–	76
7	Gerry Jonasson	Sophomore	F	Winnipeg, MB	(Manitoba)	–	–	–	–	–
5	Ed Hamilton	Sophomore	D	Winnipeg, MB	(Manitoba)	–	–	–	–	–
11	Rich Blanche	Sophomore	F	Hamilton, ON	(Ontario)	–	–	–	–	–
18	Terry Leifson	Junior	F	Leinan, SK	(Saskatchewan)	–	–	–	–	–
1	Frank Daly	Junior	G	Reading, MA	(Massachusetts)	0	–	–	–	–
1	Gerry Powers	Junior	G	Brampton, ON	(Ontario)	34	–	–	–	–
Total										

== Goaltending statistics ==
No.	Name	Games	Minutes	Wins	Losses	Ties	Goals against	Saves	Shut outs	SV %	GAA
1	Gerry Powers	34	–	28	5	1	–	–	7	.919	1.91
1	Frank Daly	0	–	–	–	–	–	–	–	–	–
Total		34	–	28	5	1	–	–	7	–	–

== 1968 championship game ==
=== (W1) Denver vs. (W2) North Dakota ===
March 16	Denver	4 – 0	North Dakota	Duluth Arena Auditorium

Scoring summary
Period	Team	Goal	Assist(s)	Time	Score
1st	None				
2nd	None				
3rd	DEN	Bob Trembecky – GW PP	Wiste and Magnuson	42:44	1–0 DEN
3rd	DEN	Bob Trembecky	Patrick	53:16	2–0 DEN
3rd	DEN	Al Genovy	Gilmore	58:06	3–0 DEN
3rd	DEN	Tom Gilmore	unassisted	58:25	4–0 DEN

Shots by period
Team	1	2	3	T
North Dakota	12	3	7	22
Denver	6	8	14	28

Goaltenders
Team	Name	Saves	Goals against	Time on ice
UND	Mike Curran	24	4	
DEN	Gerry Powers	22	0	
