= 1968–69 Denver Pioneers men's ice hockey season =

Collegiate team season

National champion WCHA Tournament, co-champion NCAA Tournament, champion
- Conference: 1st WCHA
- Home ice: DU Arena

Record
- Overall: 26–6–0
- Conference: 14–6–0
- Home: 16–2–0
- Road: 6–4–0
- Neutral: 4–0–0

Coaches and captains
- Head coach: Murray Armstrong
- Captain(s): Keith Magnuson; Tom Miller; Craig Patrick

The 1968–69 Denver Pioneers men's ice hockey team represented University of Denver in college ice hockey. In its 13th year under head coach Murray Armstrong the team compiled a 26–6–0 record and reached the NCAA tournament for the eighth time. The Pioneers defeated Cornell 4–3 in the championship game at the Broadmoor World Arena in Colorado Springs, Colorado. This was Denver's second consecutive championship and fifth in eleven years. Senior goaltender Gerry Powers tied the all-time NCAA career record of 76 wins in the championship match against the record-holder Ken Dryden.

== Season ==
Denver was hoping to be the first team to defend its National Title since the 1961 Denver squad. With only three players leaving (due to graduation) Murray Armstrong's team had a good chance to repeat. Unfortunately, the team stumbles out of the gate, losing both games in its opening series at North Dakota. The Pioneers returned to Colorado for a home-and-home series against a weak Colorado College team before going back on the road. In Houghton Denver lost its third road game to Michigan Tech before finally managing a win the following night to pull their record back to even. Denver then took two games against still-building Minnesota–Duluth and ended the first part of its schedule against two national teams with the Broadmoor World Tournament. The Pioneers were able to defeat a non-olympic US Team handily before tying the Czech Team two days later (though the game was called for Denver).

The Pioneers began the new year with a series against Colgate and dominated the eastern team in both contests. After earning a road split with Michigan Denver returned to Colorado and didn't have to leave the state for the remainder of the year. Denver went 12–2 down the stretch, playing only 1 road game at Colorado College but its loss to Michigan Tech on February 1 cost the Pioneers their chance to win the Conference championship.

Denver finished as the top western seed for the WCHA Tournament and after dropping the league's poorest team (UMD) in the first game they were given a gift from Colorado College who had knocked off North Dakota in the regional semifinal. Denver's defense continued its strong play and earned the Pioneers their second consecutive WCHA title and a trip to the 1969 NCAA Tournament.

Despite having finished second in the WCHA, Denver possessed a better record and the defending national champions were given the top western seed, placing them in the semifinal against Harvard. Denver easily dispatched the Crimson 9–2, leaving only the 27–1 Cornell Big Red standing in their way. Cornell was both the top offensive and defensive team in 1968–69 and were led by the NCAA's all-time wins leader Ken Dryden. Denver, however, was able to reply with Gerry Powers, who had only one fewer wins than the future Hall of famer. The two titans clashed in one of the more anticipated national championships in history and early on it was apparent that Denver had come to play when Tom Gilmore deflected the puck past Dryden less than three minutes in. Cornell tied the game a little over 10 minutes later and the two teams ended the first ties 1-all. Both goalies continued to stymie the opposition until a Cornell penalty allowed Denver to pull ahead once more but this time it only took the Big Red two minutes to tie the game for a third time. Denver's withering attack continued to pressure Dryden and two more pucks got past the Cornell netminder to give Denver a late 2-goal edge. The drama of the contest was not finished, however, and after coincidental minors left the teams at 4-on-4, Cornell scored with the extra space then pulled Dryden to effectively give their team a power play in the final minute but Powers stood firm and allowed Denver to keep their lead and win the championship.

Keith Magnuson led the team's offence from the blueline in the title game and his three assists won him the tournament MOP. He was joined by teammates Tom Miller, Bob Trembecky and Gerry Powers on the All-Tournament first team. Powers joined a very select group of goaltenders who won consecutive national titles and was the last to do so until Hunter Shepard in 2019. Magnuson and George Morrison were named to both the AHCA All-American West Team and All-WCHA First Team while Powers and Miller made the Conference Second Team. Morrison, for leading Denver in both goals and points, won the WCHA Sophomore of the Year Award.

== Standings ==
1968–69 Western Collegiate Hockey Association standings
	Conference							Overall					
	GP	W	L	T	PCT	GF	GA	GP	W	L	T	GF	GA
Michigan Tech†*	20	14	5	1	.725	86	56	32	21	9	2	144	95
Denver*	20	14	6	0	.700	94	50	32	26	6	0	160	71
North Dakota	22	15	7	0	.682	97	89	29	18	10	1	130	125
Michigan	18	10	8	0	.556	75	63	28	16	12	0	124	101
Minnesota	22	11	9	2	.545	74	60	29	13	13	3	113	96
Michigan State	18	7	10	1	.417	51	57	28	11	16	1	91	123
Colorado College	18	4	14	0	.222	47	94	28	12	16	0	105	121
Minnesota–Duluth	22	3	19	0	.136	64	119	29	6	23	0	91	147
Championship: Michigan Tech, Denver † indicates conference regular season champion * indicates conference tournament champion

== Schedule ==
Date	Opponent^{#}	Rank^{#}	Site	Decision	Result	Record
Exhibition
November 8	vs. DU Hilltoppers*		DU Arena • Denver, Colorado	-	W 4–0	
November 10	vs. DU Hilltoppers*		DU Arena • Denver, Colorado	-	W 12–4	
Regular Season
November 15	at North Dakota		Winter Sports Building • Grand Forks, North Dakota	Powers	L 3–4	0–1 (0–1)
November 16	at North Dakota		Winter Sports Building • Grand Forks, North Dakota	Powers	L 5–7	0–2 (0–2)
November 22	vs. Colorado College		DU Arena • Denver, Colorado	Powers	W 7–0	1–2 (1–2)
November 23	at Colorado College		Broadmoor World Arena • Colorado Springs, Colorado	Powers	W 4–2	2–2 (2–2)
November 30	vs. DU Hilltoppers*		DU Arena • Denver, Colorado (Exhibition)	-	W 11–2	2–2 (2–2)
December 6	at Michigan Tech		Dee Stadium • Houghton, Michigan	Powers	L 1–3	2–3 (2–3)
December 7	at Michigan Tech		Dee Stadium • Houghton, Michigan	Powers	W 5–1	3–3 (3–3)
December 20	at Minnesota–Duluth		Duluth Arena Auditorium • Duluth, Minnesota	Powers	W 4–3	4–3 (4–3)
December 21	at Minnesota–Duluth		Duluth Arena Auditorium • Duluth, Minnesota	Powers	W 7–4	5–3 (5–3)
December 27	vs. US National Team*		Broadmoor World Arena • Colorado Springs, Colorado (Broadmoor World Tournament)	Powers	W 6–0	6–3 (5–3)
December 29	vs. Czech National Team*		Broadmoor World Arena • Colorado Springs, Colorado (Broadmoor World Tournament)	Powers	W 2–2†	7–3 (5–3)
January 3	vs. Colgate*		DU Arena • Denver, Colorado	Powers	W 9–1	8–3 (5–3)
January 4	vs. Colgate*		DU Arena • Denver, Colorado	Powers	W 13–3	9–3 (5–3)
January 10	at Michigan		Weinberg Coliseum • Ann Arbor, Michigan	Powers	L 4–5 ^{OT}	9–4 (5–4)
January 11	at Michigan		Weinberg Coliseum • Ann Arbor, Michigan	Powers	W 5–3	10–4 (6–4)
January 17	vs. Minnesota–Duluth		DU Arena • Denver, Colorado	Powers	W 8–2	11–4 (7–4)
January 18	vs. Minnesota–Duluth		DU Arena • Denver, Colorado	Powers	W 8–2	12–4 (8–4)
January 24	vs. Colorado College		DU Arena • Denver, Colorado	Powers	W 6–0	13–4 (9–4)
January 25	at Colorado College		Broadmoor World Arena • Colorado Springs, Colorado	Powers	W 2–1	14–4 (10–4)
January 31	vs. Michigan Tech		DU Arena • Denver, Colorado	Powers	W 3–0	15–4 (11–4)
February 1	vs. Michigan Tech		DU Arena • Denver, Colorado	Powers	L 2–4	15–5 (11–5)
February 4	vs. North Dakota		DU Arena • Denver, Colorado	Powers	W 6–0	16–5 (12–5)
February 7	vs. North Dakota		DU Arena • Denver, Colorado	Powers	W 4–3	17–5 (13–5)
February 14	vs. Michigan State		DU Arena • Denver, Colorado	Powers	W 9–4	18–5 (14–5)
February 15	vs. Michigan State		DU Arena • Denver, Colorado	Powers	L 1–2	18–6 (14–6)
February 21	vs. Canadian National Team*		DU Arena • Denver, Colorado	Powers	W 5–3	19–6 (14–6)
February 22	vs. Canadian National Team*		DU Arena • Denver, Colorado	Powers	W 3–2	20–6 (14–6)
February 18	vs. Alberta*		DU Arena • Denver, Colorado	Powers	W 5–1	21–6 (14–6)
March 1	vs. Alberta*		DU Arena • Denver, Colorado	Powers	W 3–2	22–6 (14–6)
WCHA Tournament
March 6	vs. Minnesota–Duluth*		DU Arena • Denver, Colorado (WCHA First Round)	Powers	W 4–1	23–6 (14–6)
March 8	vs. Colorado College*		DU Arena • Denver, Colorado (WCHA Second Round)	Powers	W 3–1	24–6 (14–6)
NCAA Tournament
March 13	vs. Harvard*		Broadmoor World Arena • Colorado Springs, Colorado (National Semifinal)	Powers	W 9–2	25–6 (14–6)
March 15	vs. Cornell*		Broadmoor World Arena • Colorado Springs, Colorado (National championship)	Powers	W 4–3	26–6 (14–6)
*Non-conference game. ^{#}Rankings from USCHO.com Poll. Source:

† game called 1–0 for Denver.

== Roster and scoring statistics ==
No.	Name	Year	Position	Hometown	S/P/C	Games	Goals	Assists	Points	PIM
16	George Morrison	Sophomore	LW	Toronto, ON	(Ontario)	32	40	18	58	12
8	Tom Miller	Senior	F	Kitchener, ON	(Ontario)	30	13	33	46	14
13	Don Thiessen	Junior	F	Saskatoon, SK	(Saskatchewan)	–	–	–	35	-
15	Bob Trembecky	Senior	C	Drumheller, AB	(Alberta)	32	13	22	35	-
2	Keith Magnuson	Senior	D	Saskatoon, SK	(Saskatchewan)	32	7	27	34	48
14	Lynn Powis	Sophomore	C	Saskatoon, SK	(Saskatchewan)	30	17	12	29	21
9	Al Genovy	Junior	C	Flin Flon, MB	(Manitoba)	30	8	19	27	19
12	Tom Gilmore	Junior	F	Flin Flon, MB	(Manitoba)	31	11	13	24	28
4	Randy Ward	Senior	D	Calgary, AB	(Alberta)	–	–	–	19	–
17	Craig Patrick	Junior	RW	Detroit, MI	(Michigan)	17	7	8	15	6
6	Dale Zeman	Senior	D	Saskatoon, SK	(Saskatchewan)	–	2	11	13	54
3	Tim Gould	Senior	D	Saskatoon, SK	(Saskatchewan)	32	3	10	13	32
7	Gerry Jonasson	Junior	F	Winnipeg, MB	(Manitoba)	–	–	–	11	–
19	Bill Pettinger	Sophomore	D	Edmonton, AB	(Alberta)	22	–	–	10	–
11	Rich Blanche	Junior	F	Hamilton, ON	(Ontario)	–	–	–	7	–
5	Ed Hamilton	Junior	D	Winnipeg, MB	(Manitoba)	–	–	–	5	–
-	John Saville	Sophomore	D	Weston, ON	(Ontario)	–	–	–	3	–
18	Terry Leifson	Senior	F	Leinan, SK	(Saskatchewan)	–	–	–	0	–
-	Dan Helm	Sophomore	D	Saskatoon, SK	(Saskatchewan)	–	–	–	0	–
1	Frank Daly	Senior	G	Reading, MA	(Massachusetts)	1	–	–	–	–
1	Gerry Powers	Senior	G	Brampton, ON	(Ontario)	32	–	–	–	–
Total										

== Goaltending statistics ==
No.	Name	Games	Minutes	Wins	Losses	Ties	Goals against	Saves	Shut outs	SV %	GAA
1	Gerry Powers	32	–	26	6	0	–	–	5	.915	2.23
1	Frank Daly	1	–	0	0	0	–	–	0	1.000	0.00
Total		32	–	26	6	0	–	–	5	–	–

== 1969 championship game ==
=== (W1) Denver vs. (E1) Cornell ===
March 15	Denver	4 – 3	Cornell	Broadmoor World Arena

Scoring summary
Period	Team	Goal	Assist(s)	Time	Score
1st	DEN	Tom Gilmore	Powis and Magnuson	2:41	1–0 DEN
1st	COR	Dan Lodboa	Pattison	13:09	1–1
2nd	DEN	George Morrison - PP	Miller and Magnuson	30:25	2–1 DEN
2nd	COR	Brian Cornell	Tufford	33:31	2–2
3rd	DEN	Bob Trembecky - PP	Magnuson and Patrick	44:17	3–2 DEN
3rd	DEN	Tom Miller - GW	Zeman	51:50	4–2 DEN
3rd	COR	Gordon Lowe	Giullani	58:40	4–3 DEN

Shots by period
Team	1	2	3	T
Cornell	12	9	15	36
Denver	9	9	7	25

Goaltenders
Team	Name	Saves	Goals against	Time on ice
COR	Ken Dryden	21	4	
DEN	Gerry Powers	33	3	

== Players drafted in the 1969 NHL Amateur Draft ==
Round	Pick	Player	NHL team
6	68	Lynn Powis	Montreal Canadiens
