= 1968 NCAA University Division men's ice hockey tournament =

College ice hockey tournament

- Teams: 4
- Finals site: Duluth Arena Auditorium, Duluth, Minnesota
- Champions: Denver Pioneers (4th title)
- Runner-up: North Dakota Fighting Sioux (4th title game)
- Semifinalists: Boston College Eagles (9th Frozen Four); Cornell Big Red (2nd Frozen Four)
- Winning coach: Murray Armstrong (4th title)
- MOP: Gerry Powers (Denver)
- Attendance: 13,346

The 1968 NCAA Men's University Division Ice Hockey Tournament was the culmination of the 1967–68 NCAA University Division men's ice hockey season, the 21st such tournament in NCAA history. It was held between March 14 and 16, 1968, and concluded with Denver defeating North Dakota 4–0. All games were played at the Duluth Arena Auditorium in Duluth, Minnesota.

== Qualifying teams ==
Four teams qualified for the tournament, two each from the eastern and western regions. The ECAC tournament champion and the two WCHA tournament co-champions received automatic bids into the tournament. An at-large bid was offered to a second eastern team based upon both their ECAC tournament finish as well as their regular season record.

East							West						
Seed	School	Conference	Record	Berth type	Appearance	Last bid	Seed	School	Conference	Record	Berth type	Appearance	Last bid
1	Cornell	ECAC Hockey	26–1–0	Tournament champion	2nd	1967	1	Denver	WCHA	26–5–1	Tournament co-champion	7th	1966
2	Boston College	ECAC Hockey	19–9–1	At-Large	9th	1965	2	North Dakota	WCHA	19–9–3	Tournament co-champion	6th	1967

== Format ==
The ECAC champion was seeded as the top eastern team while the WCHA co-champion with the better regular season record was given the top western seed. The second eastern seed was slotted to play the top western seed and vice versa. All games were played at the Duluth Arena Auditorium. All matches were Single-game eliminations with the semifinal winners advancing to the national championship game and the losers playing in a consolation game.

== Bracket ==
Semifinals; March 14–15
W1	Denver	4
E2	Boston College	1
E1	Cornell	1
W2	North Dakota	3

National Championship; March 16
W1	Denver	4
W2	North Dakota	0
Third Place Game
E1	Cornell	6
E2	Boston College	1

Note: * denotes overtime period(s)

=== Semifinals ===
==== (W1) Denver vs. (E2) Boston College ====
March 14	Denver	4 – 1	Boston College	Duluth Arena Auditorium	Recap
(Magnuson, Jonasson) Tom Gilmore - 03:45		First period	07:37 - Mike Flynn (unassisted)
(Genovy, Zeman) Jim Shires - GW - 15:47		Second period	No scoring
(Koroll, Miller) Jim Shires - 00:29 (Koroll) Tom Miller - 01:12		Third period	No scoring
(16 saves / 17 shots) Gerry Powers		Goalie stats	George McPhee (29 saves / 33 shots)

==== (E1) Cornell vs. (W2) North Dakota ====
March 15	Cornell	1 – 3	North Dakota	Duluth Arena Auditorium	Recap
No Scoring		First period	No scoring
No scoring		Second period	02:40 - Dave Kartio (Abram); 13:44 - GW - Gary Lyons (Gasparini)
(Tufford, Hughes) Brian Cornell - 11:09		Third period	01:38 - PP - Bob Munro (Ogden)
( 30 saves / 33 shots ) Ken Dryden		Goalie stats	Mike Curran ( 21 saves / 22 shots )

=== Consolation Game ===
==== (E1) Cornell vs. (E2) Boston College ====
March 16	Cornell	6 – 1	Boston College	Duluth Arena Auditorium	Recap
(Hughes, Giuliani) Brian Cornell - 11:56 (Lewis) Bruce Pattison - GW - 13:54 (Giuliani, Ryan) Dick Bertrand - 15:23		First period	No scoring
(Hughes, Lowe) Brian Cornell - 01:22 (Pattison, Stanowski) Peter Tufford - PP - 13:54 (Tufford, Hughes) Brian Cornell - 14:28		Second period	No scoring
No scoring		Third period	05:52 - Whitey Allen (Ahern, Clarke)
( 22 saves / 23 shots ) Ken Dryden		Goalie stats	Jeff Cohen ( 15 saves / 19 shots ) / George McPhee ( 21 saves / 23 shots )

=== National Championship ===
==== (W1) Denver vs. (W2) North Dakota ====
March 16	Denver	4 – 0	North Dakota	Duluth Arena Auditorium

Scoring summary
Period	Team	Goal	Assist(s)	Time	Score
1st	None				
2nd	None				
3rd	DEN	Bob Trembecky – GW	Wiste and Magnuson	42:44	1–0 DEN
3rd	DEN	Bob Trembecky	Patrick	53:16	2–0 DEN
3rd	DEN	Al Genovy	Gilmore	58:06	3–0 DEN
3rd	DEN	Tom Gilmore	unassisted	58:25	4–0 DEN
Penalty summary
Period	Team	Player	Penalty	Time	PIM
1st	DEN	Tom Gilmore	Tripping	3:22	2:00
1st	DEN	Dale Zeman	Slashing	9:05	2:00
1st	UND	John Marks	Interference	13:07	2:00
1st	UND	Gary Lyons	Tripping	14:42	2:00
1st	DEN	Al Genovy	Tripping	19:05	2:00
2nd	UND	Terry Abram	Holding	23:32	2:00
2nd	DEN	Tom Gilmore	Holding	27:09	2:00
2nd	UND	Terry Ogden	Cross-checking	39:03	2:00
3rd	UND	Mike Furlong	Illegal check	43:31	2:00
3rd	DEN	Tim Gould	Slashing	45:34	2:00
3rd	DEN	Keith Magnuson	Interference	55:43	2:00

Shots by period
Team	1	2	3	T
North Dakota	12	3	7	22
Denver	6	8	14	28

Goaltenders
Team	Name	Saves	Goals against	Time on ice
UND	Mike Curran	24	4	
DEN	Gerry Powers	22	0	

== All-Tournament Team ==
=== First Team ===
- G: Gerry Powers* (Denver)
- D: Terry Abram (North Dakota)
- D: Keith Magnuson (Denver)
- F: Brian Cornell (Cornell)
- F: Bob Munro (North Dakota)
- F: Bob Trembecky (Denver)

* Most Outstanding Player(s)

=== Second Team ===
- G: Ken Dryden (Cornell)
- D: Tim Gould (Denver)
- D: Terry Ogden (North Dakota)
- F: Dave Kartio (North Dakota)
- F: Jim Wiste (Denver)
- F: Tom Gilmore (Denver)
