= Patrick Gilmore (actor) =

Canadian actor (born 1976)

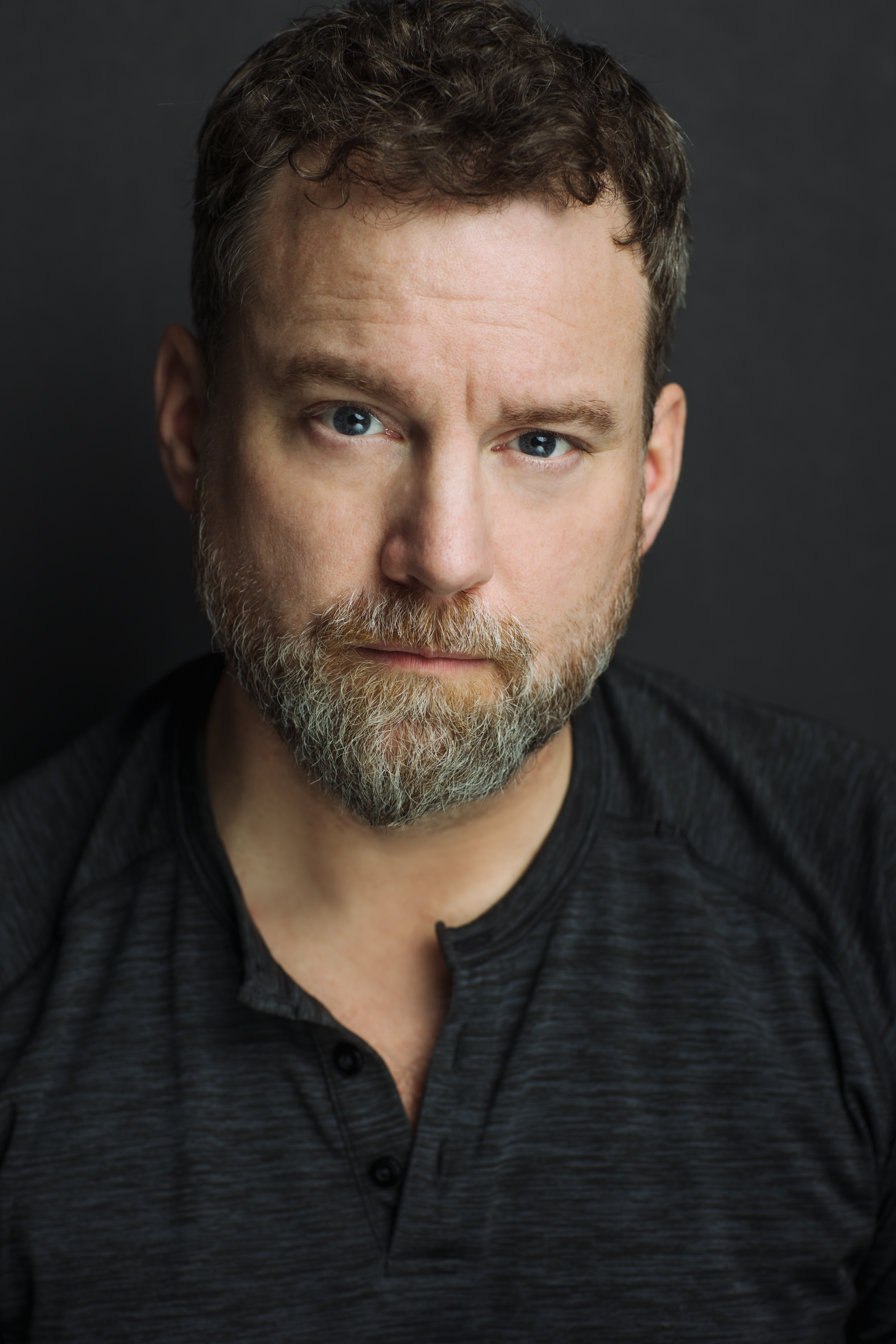
- Gilmore in 2023
- Born: June 1, 1976 (age 50); Edmonton, Alberta, Canada
- Education: University of Alberta
- Occupation: Actor
- Years active: 2001–present
- Father: Tom Gilmore
- Relatives: Scott Gilmore (brother)

Patrick Gilmore (born June 1, 1976) is a Canadian actor known for playing the roles of Dale Volker in the Syfy science fiction series Stargate Universe (2009–2011) and David Mailer in the Netflix series Travelers (2016–2018). He has also had recurring roles in Eureka (2007), Battlestar Galactica (2009), You Me Her (2016–2020), and School Spirits (2023-). Patrick has stated on his TikTok account that he was in a band.

== Early and personal life ==
Gilmore was born Patrick Watson Gilmore in Edmonton, Alberta, to Collette and professional hockey player Tom Gilmore, who was playing for the World Hockey Association version of the Edmonton Oilers. His brother is Scott Gilmore, executive director and one of the founders of Peace Dividend Trust, now called Building Markets. He is also the former brother-in-law of politician Catherine McKenna. Gilmore is a graduate of the University of Alberta with a degree in English Literature.

== Filmography ==
=== Film ===
Year	Title	Role	Notes
2005	Devour	Deputy #1	
2007	The Last Mimzy	FBI task force agent	
2007	Beneath	Randy	
2008	Shred	Lennox	
2009	The Masculine Mystique	Darcy	
2009	Trick 'r Treat	Bud the cameraman	
2009	What Goes Up	Hank Pelzman	
2009	2012	Ark communications officer	
2009	Year of the Carnivore	Todd	
2009	Messages Deleted	Kanter	
2010	Dear Mr. Gacy	Glen Phillips	
2011	Recoil	Kirby	
2011	Sunflower Hour	Leslie Humphries	
2012	The Cabin in the Woods	Werewolf wrangler	
2013	12 Rounds 2: Reloaded	Simmons	
2015	No Men Beyond This Point	Andrew Myers	
2018	Scorched Earth	Sheriff Grubbs	
2020	Endless	Jenkins	

=== Television ===
Year	Title	Role	Notes
2001	Mentors	Rocket	Episode: "Remembrance Day"
2002	100 Days in the Jungle	Skunk (Steven Brent)	TV film
2003	Tru Calling	Blonde	Episode: "Past Tense"
2004	Da Vinci's Inquest	Ned Partridge	Episode: "Okay It's Official"
2004	Touching Evil	Donnie's brother-in-law	Episode: "Boston"
2004	Family Sins	Scott Mathers	TV film
2004	The Love Crimes of Gillian Guess	Cop #2, Angus	TV film
2005	The Dead Zone	Doug Driscoll	Episode: "The Last Goodbye"
2005	Selling Innocence	Karl	TV film
2005	Intelligence	Roy	TV film
2006	Stargate SG-1	Bernie Ackerman	Episode: "Morpheus"
2006	Saved	Brian	Episode: "Tango"
2006	Final Days of Planet Earth	Spence	TV film
2006	The Sweet Easy	Brent	TV film
2006–2007	Intelligence	Roy	Recurring role
2007	Eureka	Pete Puhlman	Episode: "Unpredictable"
2007	Reaper	Bobby Hartford	Episode: "What about Blob?"
2007	Supernatural	Ken Watson	Episode: "Bedtime Stories"
2007	Lost in the Dark	Mike Webb	a.k.a. Enemy Within, TV film
2008	Stargate Atlantis	Genii soldier	Episode: "Harmony"
2008	Smallville	Researcher	Episode: "Odyssey"
2008	Every Second Counts	Vet	TV film
2008	Mail Order Bride	Homesteader	TV film
2009	Battlestar Galactica	Rafferty	2 episodes
2009	Defying Gravity	Trent	Episode: "Eve Ate the Apple"
2009	Riese	Trennan	Recurring role
2009	Living Out Loud	Drunk karaoke guy	TV film
2009–2011	Stargate Universe	Dale Volker	Recurring role
2010	Shattered	Brian Summers	Episode: "Scars"
2010	Fringe	Deputy Ferguson	Episode: "Northwest Passage"
2010	16 Wishes	Bob Jensen	TV film
2011	Fairly Legal	Douglas Pease	Episode: "Pilot"
2011	The Killing	Tom Drexler	4 episodes
2011	Normal	Nurse George	TV film
2012	Primeval: New World	Blake	Episode: "Angry Birds"
2012	The Horses of McBride	Winston	TV film
2013	Continuum	Rex	Episode: "Second Skin"
2014	Gracepoint	Pete Lawson	6 episodes
2014	Arrow	Erlich Kelso	Episode: "Sara"
2014	Psych	Patrick	Episode: "S.E.I.Z.E. the Day"
2016	Anything for Love	Reggie	TV film
2016–2018	Travelers	David Mailer	Main role
2016–2020	You Me Her	Shaun	Recurring role
2019–2021	Jann	Dave	Main role
2021	The Good Doctor	Murray Burns	Episode: "Forgive or Forget"
2021–2024	Family Law	Bryan Beasley	4 episodes
2023–present	School Spirits	Mr. Anderson	Main role
2025	Happy Face	Cody O'Neill	3 episodes
2026	The Audacity	Ethan Stern	2 episodes
2026	Yaga	Eckert	Upcoming series
