= Gerry Powers =

Canadian ice hockey player

- Born: Brampton, Ontario, Canada
- Height: 6 ft 0 in (183 cm)
- Weight: 183 lb (83 kg; 13 st 1 lb)
- Position: Goaltender
- Caught: Left
- Played for: Denver
- NHL draft: Undrafted
- Playing career: 1966–1971

Gerald Powers is a Canadian retired ice hockey player. He helped the Denver Pioneers men's ice hockey win consecutive NCAA National Titles in 1968 and 1969. He received the Tournament MOP in 1968 and finished his college career with a then-NCAA-record 76 victories and 13 shoutous, currently third- and second-all-time respectively for the Pioneers (as of 2019).

== Career ==
Powers joined the varsity squad in 1966–67, winning all 22 games for Denver that season, but he was outshone by fellow sophomore goalie Ken Dryden. Powers helped Denver finish second in the WCHA but because the conference tournament was split along regional lines the Pioneers were placed in the same division as the top-seeded Fighting Sioux. Denver would easily defeat their first round opponent, Colorado College before falling to North Dakota in the second round 2–3, narrowly missing out on the 1967 NCAA Tournament.

Powers returned as the starter for his junior season and with a loaded team, Denver set its sights on the title. After some early season trouble Denver got hot after the new year and didn't lose another game all season. Powers set new team records with 7 shutouts that season as well as 22 consecutive wins (still team records as of 2018). The WCHA had realigned its tournament and abandoned the regional matchups meaning top-seeded Denver would play the worst team in each round and dominated the competition, being named co-champions of the 1968 Tournament. While Powers wasn't called upon much in the conference championship he was much more intrinsic to Denver's chances in the National Tournament. After opening with a 4–1 win over Boston College Denver met North Dakota in the final. Both Powers and Mike Curran kept the game scoreless until the third period when Denver scored a power play goal. While DU's offense rose to the occasion in the final frame, the Fighting Sioux wilted and Powers shut the opposition out, earning the first championship shutout in NCAA history. Powers tied the NCAA record with a 0.50 goals against average in the tournament (set the year before) and was named as Tournament MOP.

The following season Denver continued their torrid pace. In his final season with the Pioneers Powers won a further 26 games, setting a new program record with 76 victories (3rd most as of 2018) and recorded 5 more shutouts to bright his career total up to 13, yet another Denver record (2nd most as of 2018). While Powers wasn't able to continue his winning streak past the first game of the season he did help Denver win a second consecutive tournament championship and make the 1969 NCAA Tournament. Denver's offense was more in force than it had been the year before and Powers had an easy task in the semifinal before the long-awaited showdown with Cornell. The title game brought together two senior goalies with the most wins in NCAA history (Dryden's 76 to Powers 75) and while the future Hall of Famer would falter in his final game, Powers would not. Gerry turned away 33 of Cornell's 36 shots and lead the Pioneers to the program's fifth national championship in only 11 seasons. The two netminders both left the championship game with 76 wins, an NCAA record for three seasons that would stand for over 20 years.

After graduating with a bachelor's in Marketing and Business Powers continued his playing career for the Galt Hornets, helping the team to win the Allan Cup in 1971. After retiring as a player Powers founded an advertising company and later became a real estate broker.

Powers was inducted into the Denver Athletic Hall of Fame in 2010 and received the Daniel Ritchie Spirit Award in 2016.

== Awards and honors ==
Award	Year
All-WCHA Second Team	1967–68
All-NCAA All-Tournament First Team	1968, 1969
All-WCHA Second Team	1968–69

Awards and achievements
Preceded by Skip Stanowski	NCAA Tournament Most Outstanding Player; 1968	Succeeded by Keith Magnuson
