= Scott Gilmore =

Canadian entrepreneur and writer

40th Principal Secretary to the Prime Minister of Canada
- Incumbent
- Assumed office 13 July 2026
- Preceded by: Tom Pitfield

Personal details
- Born: Flin Flon, Manitoba, Canada
- Party: Liberal
- Other political affiliations: Conservative (former)
- Spouse: Catherine McKenna (sep. 2019)
- Children: 3
- Parent: Tom Gilmore (father)
- Relatives: Patrick Gilmore (brother)
- Education: University of Alberta (B.Com.); London School of Economics (M.Sc.)
- Occupation: Social entrepreneur; writer; diplomat; policy advisor
- Known for: Founding Building Markets

Scott Gilmore is a Canadian entrepreneur and policy advisor who has served as the principal secretary to the prime minister since 2026. He is also known for founding the non-profit Building Markets.

== Early life and education ==
Gilmore was born in northern Manitoba, the son of hockey player Tom Gilmore and Collette Gilmore. He is the brother of actor Patrick Gilmore. The family settled in Edmonton, Alberta, when his father played for the World Hockey Association version of the Edmonton Oilers. Gilmore obtained a Bachelor of Commerce degree at the University of Alberta, followed by a master's degree in international history from the London School of Economics.

== Career ==
Gilmore was a Canadian foreign service officer who began his career in Jakarta. From that post he covered the civil war resulting from the Indonesian occupation of East Timor, and later joined the United Nations Transitional Administration in East Timor (UNTAET) peacekeeping mission under Sergio de Mello. In that role he became disillusioned with ineffective donor efforts to fight poverty. Based on this experience he quit his job as a diplomat in 2004 to launch the non-profit Building Markets. and focus on capitalism instead of aid as a sustainable poverty solution.

In 2006 Gilmore led a World Bank study to trace spending in peacekeeping missions that revealed only 5% of donor money entered the local economies. Based on those findings Gilmore launched a project in Afghanistan to channel international spending through local small businesses. This approach was successful and expanded to other countries. Building Market's "buy local" policy was officially adopted by NATO, the United States government, and the United Nations. In 2013 Gilmore was appointed to by the External Advisory Group overseeing the merger of the Canadian Department of Foreign Affairs and International Trade with the Canadian International Development Agency. He had previously been supportive of the merger.

From 2014 to 2022, Gilmore wrote a weekly column for the Canadian week national newsmagazine Maclean's on issues such foreign affairs , conflict of interest in the Canadian journalism industry and Canadian identity in regard with national unity.

== Political career ==
During the 2015 election, Gilmore took issues with how the Conservative Party of Canada portrayed their masculinity arguing that they used to act fearless and now acted frighting by pointing to Minister of Citizenship and Immigration Chris Alexander conduct as an example. After the 2015 election, he revealed that his family were supporters of the Conservative party since they immigrated to Canada. Gilmore added that he disliked the Liberal party due to family members being bankrupted from the National Energy Policy. However, he decided to vote for the Liberal Party of Canada led by Justin Trudeau after he felt that the Conservative party only cared about fringes while away others within the party and neglected attracting voters from other parties.In 2017 Conservative leadership race, he was critical of Conservative Party of Canada candidates and advocated to building a new party around liberty, equality and facts over ideology. Gilmore traveled across the country to start a conversation over it.

In March 2025, Gilmore announced that he was joining the Prime Minister's Office as senior advisor on foreign, defence, and security policy to Prime Minister Mark Carney. In 2026, he was promoted to principal secretary. The appointment criticized in an article in APTN News because of comments Gilmore wrote in a January 2016 MacLean's article:

The only way we can ever truly help the people of La Loche and hundreds of other remote communities like it, is to give those who want it a viable option to leave, to build lives in southern Canada, integrated into one of the world’s healthiest, safest, [and] most rewarding societies.

If we really want to end the violence and depravation that plagues Canada’s remote Aboriginal communities, we need to help them leave these communities, forever. And if we are still not ready to do that yet, then the least we can do to help is to send them a backhoe as they keep digging graves.

== Awards and honours ==
Gilmore was named as "Transformational Canadian" by The Globe and Mail and a Young Global Leaders by the World Economic Forum. In 2009 he was awarded the $765,000 Skoll Prize for Social Entrepreneurship by philanthropist Jeff Skoll. The University of Alberta awarded him a Distinguished Alumnus Award in 2013. He received a Queen Elizabeth II Diamond Jubilee Medal for professional excellence.

== Personal life ==
Gilmore was married to Catherine McKenna, former Liberal MP for Ottawa Centre and former cabinet minister until separating in 2019. They have three children together.
