= Hulford =

Hulford is a surname. Notable people with the surname include:

- Frederick Hulford (1883–1976), British middle distance runner
- Stephen Hulford (born 1971), Canadian businessman
