= Jim Wiste =

Canadian ice hockey player (1946–2018)

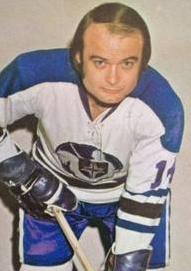
- Wiste in 1972–73
- Born: February 18, 1946 Moose Jaw, Saskatchewan, Canada
- Died: January 2, 2018 (aged 71) Denver, Colorado, U.S.
- Height: 5 ft 10 in (178 cm)
- Weight: 185 lb (84 kg; 13 st 3 lb)
- Position: Centre
- Shot: Left
- Played for: Chicago Black Hawks; Vancouver Canucks; Cleveland Crusaders; Indianapolis Racers
- Playing career: 1968–1976

James Andrew Wiste (February 18, 1946 – January 2, 2018) was a Canadian professional ice hockey player who spent parts of three seasons in the National Hockey League between 1968 and 1971. He was an original member of the Vancouver Canucks upon their entry into the NHL in 1970, and also played for the Chicago Black Hawks, as well as the Cleveland Crusaders and Indianapolis Racers of the World Hockey Association, and also spent time in the minor leagues before retiring in 1976.

== Playing career ==
Wiste was a college hockey star at the University of Denver, where he was named a Western Collegiate Hockey Association First-Team All-Star and NCAA First-Team All-American in both 1966–67 and 1967–68. He would also lead Denver to a memorable triumph over the University of North Dakota in the 1968 NCAA Championship game.

Following his graduation, Wiste was signed as a free agent by the NHL Chicago Black Hawks in 1968, one of three University of Denver teammates to join Chicago along with Keith Magnuson and Cliff Koroll. He would establish himself as a quality scorer in minor-pro, but unlike Magnuson and Koroll who both became fixtures in the Chicago lineup for more than a decade, Wiste found the adjustment to the NHL difficult, and found it hard to get icetime on a deep Black Hawk team. After a 3-game stint in Chicago in 1968–69, he spent most of the 1969–70 campaign with the Black Hawks, but was often a healthy scratch and failed to record a goal in 26 games.

Exposed by Chicago in the 1970 NHL Expansion Draft, Wiste was claimed by the Vancouver Canucks. He was a member of the inaugural Vancouver Canuck squad in 1970–71, but again struggled to produce. After recording just 1 goal and 3 points through 23 games, he was reassigned to the Seattle Totems of the WHL.

After another season in the minors, Wiste was one of many fringe NHL players to jump to the rival upstart World Hockey Association for the 1972–73 campaign, signing with the Cleveland Crusaders. In Cleveland, he would experience the most successful portion of his career, recording totals of 71 and 58 points in his two years there.

Wiste moved to the Indianapolis Racers for the 1974–75 season, but slumped to totals of 13 goals and 41 points. After a poor start to the 1975–76 campaign, Wiste was assigned to the minors and would eventually retire.

Wiste recorded 1 goal and 10 assists for 11 points in 52 NHL games, and added 64 goals and 108 assists for 172 points in 228 WHA contests. Wiste died in Denver at the age of 71 on January 2, 2018.

== Career statistics ==
=== Regular season and playoffs ===
			Regular season					Playoffs
Season	Team	League	GP	G	A	Pts	PIM	GP	G	A	Pts	PIM
1962–63	Moose Jaw Canucks	SJHL	47	22	20	42	47	5	2	7	9	6
1963–64	Moose Jaw Canucks	SJHL	61	37	60	97	124	5	1	5	6	15
1964–65	University of Denver	WCHA	—	—	—	—	—	—	—	—	—	—
1965–66	University of Denver	WCHA	32	16	14	30	36	—	—	—	—	—
1966–67	University of Denver	WCHA	30	24	28	52	35	—	—	—	—	—
1967–68	University of Denver	WCHA	34	21	36	57	25	—	—	—	—	—
1968–69	Chicago Black Hawks	AHL	3	0	0	0	0	—	—	—	—	—
1968–69	Dallas Black Hawks	CHL	68	32	44	76	77	10	7	6	13	6
1969–70	Chicago Black Hawks	NHL	26	0	8	8	8	—	—	—	—	—
1969–70	Dallas Black Hawks	CHL	11	6	9	15	27	—	—	—	—	—
1970–71	Vancouver Canucks	NHL	23	1	2	3	0	—	—	—	—	—
1970–71	Seattle Totems	WHL	29	11	13	24	32	—	—	—	—	—
1971–72	Seattle Totems	WHL	4	0	0	0	0	—	—	—	—	—
1971–72	Rochester Americans	AHL	13	4	8	12	2	—	—	—	—	—
1971–72	Providence Reds	AHL	53	12	26	38	35	3	0	1	1	0
1972–73	Cleveland Crusaders	WHA	70	28	43	71	24	9	3	8	11	13
1973–74	Cleveland Crusaders	WHA	76	23	35	58	26	5	0	1	1	0
1974–75	Indianapolis Racers	WHA	75	13	28	41	30	—	—	—	—	—
1975–76	Indianapolis Racers	WHA	7	0	2	2	0	—	—	—	—	—
1975–76	Mohawk Valley Comets	NAHL	5	0	1	1	0	—	—	—	—	—
WHA totals			228	64	108	172	80	14	3	9	12	13
NHL totals			52	1	10	11	8	—	—	—	—	—

== Awards and honors ==
Award	Year
All-WCHA First Team	1966–67
AHCA East All-American	1966–67
All-WCHA First Team	1967–68
AHCA East All-American	1967–68
NCAA All-Tournament Second Team	1968
