= Underknown =

Canadian media company

- Type: Private
- Industry: Digital media
- Founded: 2016
- Founders: Stephen Hulford; Raphael Faeh; Peter Schmiedchen
- Headquarters: Toronto, Canada
- Key people: Stephen Hulford (CEO)
- Products: What If, How to Survive, Animalogic, Aperture, Popular Science FAST channel
- Website: underknown.com

Underknown Inc. is a Canadian digital-first media production company based in Toronto that specializes in short-form educational science and factual programming.

== History ==
Underknown was founded in 2016 by Steve Hulford, Raphael Faeh, and Peter Schmiedchen. It began when Hulford and Faeh produced the science-explainer series What If in Hulford’s living room. In 2019, Underknown received C$2.5 million in equity and debt financing, including support from Ontario Creates.

In May 2020, Underknown staged Live Med Aid, a five-hour global livestream that raised funds for Médecins Sans Frontières' COVID-19 response; the programme combined conversations with scientists such as Jane Goodall, Wade Davis, David Suzuki, Neil deGrasse Tyson, and Katharine Hayhoe with performances by Earth, Wind & Fire, Bombino, Barenaked Ladies, Metric, and others.

In March 2022, Underknown acquired the speculative science YouTube channel Aperture. In August 2024, Underknown bought the nature channel Animalogic from Blue Ant Media, and that November it merged with the creator services agency GPOP.

In March 2025, Underknown, in a joint initiative with the American magazine Popular Science, launched an eponymous free ad-supported streaming television (FAST) channel distributed on services such as Vizio WatchFree+, Plex and Sling Freestream.

== Productions ==
Underknown's programming uses hypothetical questions, survival scenarios and natural history storytelling to explain scientific concepts. Core franchises include the science series What If, the how-to strand How to Survive, the nature show Animalogic and the video essay channel Aperture.

== Awards ==
Underknown’s flagship science series What If won the People’s Voice Award for Science & Education (Series & Channels) at the 24th Webby Awards in 2020, where it was cited alongside BBC Ideas as one of the year's leading educational video channels. The same production was subsequently named the Video category winner and received the Audience Honor for Storytelling at the 13th Shorty Awards, which recognise excellence in social-media video.

In 2021, Underknown's pandemic‐era charity livestream Live Med Aid was honoured by RTDNA Canada with the national Digital Award for News – Live Special Events.

Underknown's survival series How to Survive received the People's Voice Award for Science & Education (Series & Channels) at the 26th Webby Awards in 2022.
