= Wayne Maki =

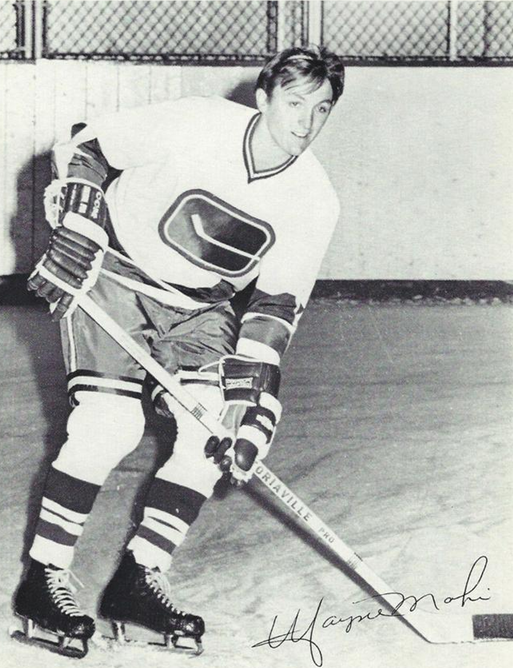
- Born: November 10, 1944 Sault Ste. Marie, Ontario, Canada
- Died: May 12, 1974 (aged 29) North Vancouver, British Columbia, Canada
- Height: 6 ft 0 in (183 cm)
- Weight: 175 lb (79 kg; 12 st 7 lb)
- Position: Left wing
- Shot: Left
- Played for: Chicago Black Hawks; St. Louis Blues; Vancouver Canucks
- Playing career: 1965–1973

Wayne Maki (November 10, 1944 – May 12, 1974) was a professional ice hockey player and an early star of the Vancouver Canucks in the National Hockey League (NHL).

== Early life ==
Maki was born in Sault Ste. Marie, Ontario, and he was of Finnish descent. He broke into professional hockey in 1964 with the St. Louis Braves of the Central Hockey League (CPHL), and joined the Chicago Black Hawks at left wing for the 1967–68 season, playing the year with his older brother Chico.

== Pro career ==
Maki was claimed by the St. Louis Blues in 1969. In a preseason game on September 21, 1969 in Ottawa Ontario, Maki and Boston Bruins defenceman "Terrible" Ted Green engaged in a bloody, violent stick-swinging fight; Green was hit in the head and suffered a fractured skull and a brain injury. Maki and Green were both charged with assault as a result of the incident, the first time NHL players faced charges as a result of on-ice violence; both were acquitted. Maki was suspended by the NHL for 30 days. Maki was eventually sent down to the Buffalo Bisons of the American Hockey League (AHL). Later commentators have rated Maki's attack as one of the most vicious attacks in league history.

The Vancouver Canucks claimed Maki in the 1970 NHL Expansion Draft. The feisty winger caught on with the team and became one of the franchise's first stars, being among the team's leading scorers both of his full seasons with the team. Maki played two-and-a-half seasons with Vancouver until being diagnosed with brain cancer in December 1972. He died on May 12, 1974 at the age of 29.

== Legacy ==
Chris Oddleifson wore the number 11 for Vancouver for the latter end of the 1973-74 season before changing his number. The Canucks unofficially retired Maki's number 11 jersey until Mark Messier, who had worn number 11 with the Edmonton Oilers and New York Rangers, joined the team in 1997. The Canucks allowed Messier to wear the number over the protest of Maki's family. After Messier left the team in 2000, no player has worn the number 11 since for Vancouver.

Maki's NHL career statistics were: 246 games played, 57 goals, 79 assists, 136 points, and 184 penalty minutes in regular season play, and two games played, one goal, no assists, one point, and two penalty minutes in the playoffs.

== Career statistics ==
			Regular season					Playoffs
Season	Team	League	GP	G	A	Pts	PIM	GP	G	A	Pts	PIM
1963–64	Sault Ste. Marie Greyhounds	NOJHA	36	43	31	74	44	—	—	—	—	—
1964–65	St. Catharines Black Hawks	OHA-Jr.	56	29	48	77	43	4	3	4	7	10
1964–65	St. Louis Braves	CPHL	3	0	0	0	4	—	—	—	—	—
1965–66	St. Louis Braves	CPHL	69	25	26	51	46	2	0	1	1	13
1966–67	St. Louis Braves	CPHL	67	31	28	59	69	—	—	—	—	—
1967–68	Chicago Black Hawks	NHL	49	5	5	10	32	2	1	0	1	2
1967–68	Dallas Black Hawks	CPHL	12	5	7	12	14	5	2	1	3	17
1968–69	Chicago Black Hawks	NHL	1	0	0	0	0	—	—	—	—	—
1968–69	Dallas Black Hawks	CHL	50	25	24	49	74	11	7	7	14	37
1969–70	St. Louis Blues	NHL	16	2	1	3	4	—	—	—	—	—
1969–70	Buffalo Bisons	AHL	40	13	20	33	72	14	4	4	8	61
1970–71	Vancouver Canucks	NHL	78	25	38	63	99	—	—	—	—	—
1971–72	Vancouver Canucks	NHL	76	22	25	47	43	—	—	—	—	—
1972–73	Vancouver Canucks	NHL	26	3	10	13	6	—	—	—	—	—
CPHL/CHL totals			251	86	85	171	207	18	9	9	18	67
NHL totals			246	57	79	136	184	2	1	0	1	2

== See also ==
- List of ice hockey players who died during their playing career
