= 1970 NHL expansion draft =

Player selection draft

General information
- Date: June 10, 1970

Overview
- League: National Hockey League
- Expansion teams: Buffalo Sabres; Vancouver Canucks
- Expansion season: 1970–71

The 1970 NHL expansion draft was the second expansion draft of the National Hockey League (NHL). The draft was held on June 10, 1970, a day before the 1970 NHL amateur draft. The expansion draft was held to allow the Buffalo Sabres and Vancouver Canucks to acquire players for the upcoming 1970–71 season.

== Rules ==
Each expansion team was to select twenty-one players from the established clubs, three players from each of the fourteen existing teams: two goaltenders and nineteen skaters. Thus, a total of 42 players were selected.

Most of the existing teams could protect two goalies and fifteen skaters. First-year pros were exempt. The existing teams could lose only a maximum of three players, including a maximum of one goaltender.

== Draft results ==
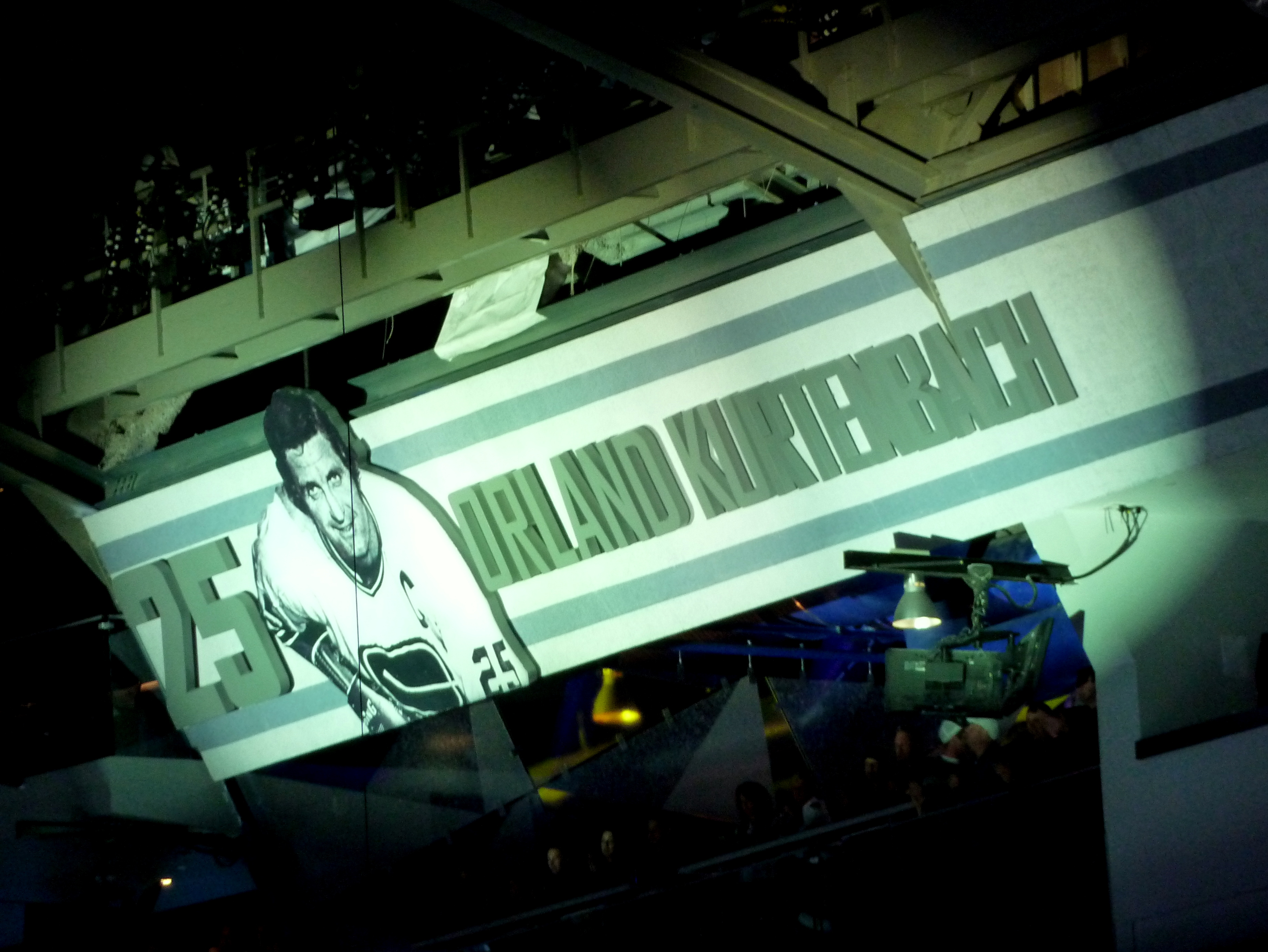
Orland Kurtenbach was the Canucks' inaugural captain.

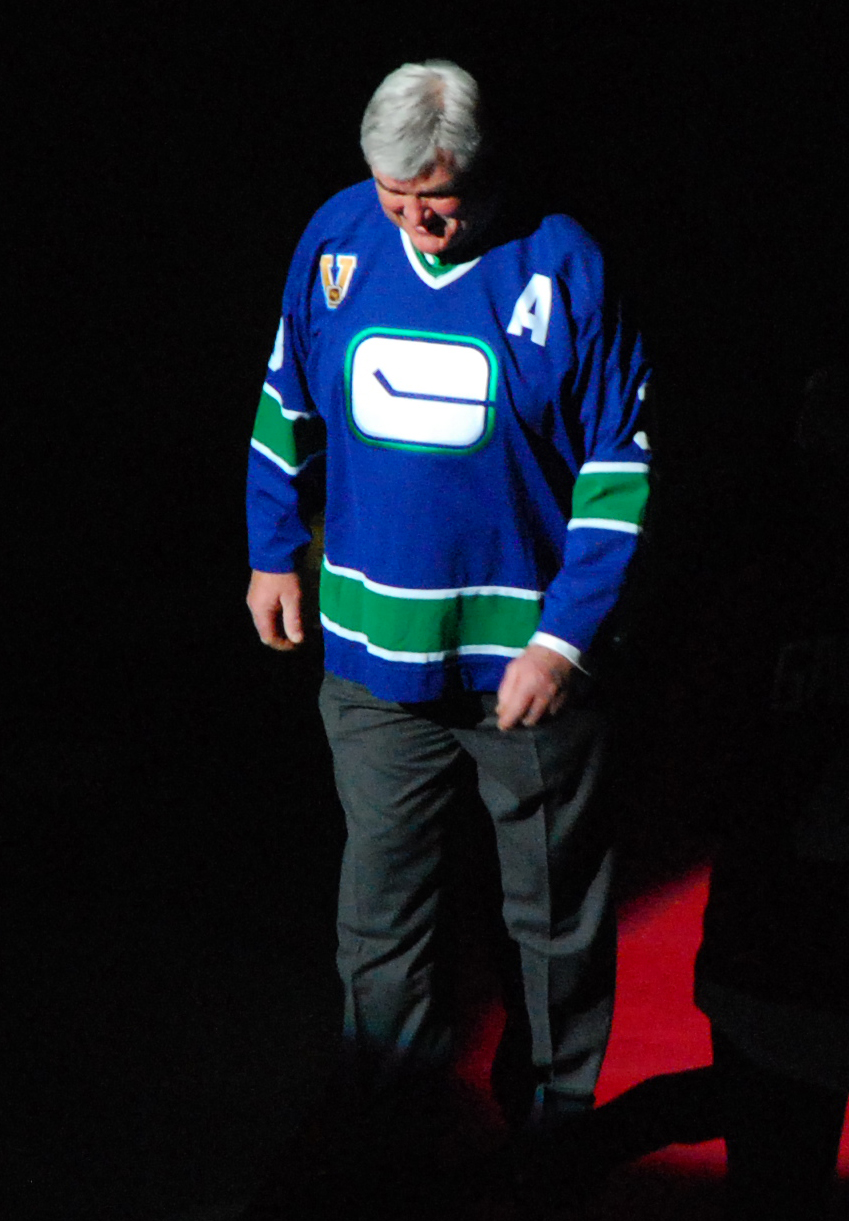
Pat Quinn later became the Canucks' president and general manager for ten seasons, and head coach for five.

*	NHL All-Star
^	NHL All-Star and NHL All-Star team
NHL seasons	Number of seasons played in the NHL prior to the draft
Franchise seasons	Number of seasons played with his draft team

#	Player	Position	Drafted by	Selected from	NHL seasons	Franchise seasons	Reference
1	Tom Webster	Right wing	Buffalo Sabres	Boston Bruins	2	Traded^{[a]}	
2	Gary Doak	Defenceman	Vancouver Canucks	Boston Bruins	5	2 (1970–1971)	
3	Al Hamilton	Defenceman	Buffalo Sabres	New York Rangers	4	2 (1970–1972)	
4	Orland Kurtenbach	Centre	Vancouver Canucks	New York Rangers	9	4 (1970–1974)	
5	Donnie Marshall^	Centre	Buffalo Sabres	New York Rangers	17	1 (1970–1971)	
6	Ray Cullen	Centre	Vancouver Canucks	Minnesota North Stars	5	1 (1970–1971)	
7	Tracy Pratt*	Defenceman	Buffalo Sabres	Pittsburgh Penguins	3	4 (1970–1973)	
8	Pat Quinn	Defenceman	Vancouver Canucks	Toronto Maple Leafs	2	2 (1970–1972)	
9	Jim Watson	Defenceman	Buffalo Sabres	Detroit Red Wings	6	2 (1970–1972)	
10	Rosaire Paiement	Centre	Vancouver Canucks	Philadelphia Flyers	3	2 (1970–1972)	
11	Francois Lacombe	Defenceman	Buffalo Sabres	Montreal Canadiens	2	1 (1970–1971)	
12	Darryl Sly	Defenceman	Vancouver Canucks	Minnesota North Stars	3	1 (1970–1971)	
13	Phil Goyette*	Centre	Buffalo Sabres	St. Louis Blues	14	2 (1970–1972)	
14	Jim Wiste	Centre	Vancouver Canucks	Chicago Black Hawks	2	1 (1970–1971)	
15	Reg Fleming*	Defenceman	Buffalo Sabres	Philadelphia Flyers	11	1 (1970–1971)	
16	Danny Johnson	Centre	Vancouver Canucks	Toronto Maple Leafs	1	2 (1970–1971)	
17	Mike McMahon	Defenceman	Buffalo Sabres	Pittsburgh Penguins	6	1 (1970)	
18	Barry Wilkins	Defenceman	Vancouver Canucks	Boston Bruins	3	5 (1970–1974)	
19	Skip Krake	Centre	Buffalo Sabres	Los Angeles Kings	6	1 (1970–1971)	
20	Ralph Stewart	Centre	Vancouver Canucks	Montreal Canadiens	0	3 (1970–1971; 1976–1978)	
21	Jean-Guy Lagace	Defenceman	Buffalo Sabres	Pittsburgh Penguins	1	1 (1970–1971)	
22	Mike Corrigan	Left winger	Vancouver Canucks	Los Angeles Kings	2	2 (1970–1971)	
23	Craig Cameron	Right wing	Buffalo Sabres	St. Louis Blues	3	Traded^{[b]}	
24	Wayne Maki	Left winger	Vancouver Canucks	St. Louis Blues	3	3 (1970–1973)	
25	Chris Evans	Defenceman	Buffalo Sabres	Toronto Maple Leafs	1	1 (1971–1972)	
26	Ed Hatoum	Right wing	Vancouver Canucks	Detroit Red Wings	2	1 (1970–1971)	
27	Doug Barrie	Defenceman	Buffalo Sabres	Pittsburgh Penguins	1	2 (1970–1971)	
28	Poul Popiel	Defenceman	Vancouver Canucks	Detroit Red Wings	4	2 (1970–1972)	
29	Gerry Meehan	Left winger	Buffalo Sabres	Philadelphia Flyers	1	5 (1970–1974)	
30	Ron Ward	Defenceman	Vancouver Canucks	Toronto Maple Leafs	1	1 (1971–1972)	
31	Paul Terbenche	Defenceman	Buffalo Sabres	Chicago Black Hawks	1	4 (1970–1974)	
32	John Schella	Defenceman	Vancouver Canucks	Montreal Canadiens	0	2 (1970–1972)	
33	Brian Perry	Left winger	Buffalo Sabres	Oakland Seals	2	1 (1970–1971)	
34	Bob Dillabough	Centre	Vancouver Canucks	Oakland Seals	7	0^{[A]}	
35	Howie Menard	Centre	Buffalo Sabres	Oakland Seals	4	Traded^{[c]}	
36	Garth Rizzuto	Centre	Vancouver Canucks	Chicago Black Hawks	0	1 (1970–1971)	
37	Dunc Wilson	Goaltender	Vancouver Canucks	Philadelphia Flyers	1	3 (1970–1973)	
38	Rocky Farr	Goaltender	Buffalo Sabres	Montreal Canadiens	0	3 (1972–1975)	
39	Charlie Hodge^	Goaltender	Vancouver Canucks	Oakland Seals	12	1 (1970–1971)	
40	Gary Edwards	Goaltender	Buffalo Sabres	St. Louis Blues	0	0^{[B]}	

== Notes ==
=== Trades ===
The following trades involving drafted players were made before the start of the 1970–71 season.

- ^{a} June 10, 1970: The Sabres traded Tom Webster to the Detroit Red Wings in exchange for goaltender Roger Crozier.
- ^{b} October 2, 1970: The Sabres traded Craig Cameron to the St. Louis Blues in exchange for Ron Anderson.
- ^{c} October 1970: The Sabres traded Howie Menard to the California Golden Seals in exchange for cash.

=== Other ===
- ^{A} Bob Dillabough played one game for the Canucks' American Hockey League (AHL) affiliate Rochester Americans and was later loaned to the Phoenix Roadrunners for the remainder of the 1970–71 season.
- ^{B} Gary Edwards was loaned to the Kansas City Blues for the 1970–71 season before being traded to the Los Angeles Kings.
