= 1969 NCAA University Division men's ice hockey tournament =

College ice hockey tournament

- Teams: 4
- Finals site: Broadmoor World Arena, Colorado Springs, Colorado
- Champions: Denver Pioneers (5th title)
- Runner-up: Cornell Big Red (2nd title game)
- Semifinalists: Harvard Crimson (4th Frozen Four); Michigan Tech Huskies (5th Frozen Four)
- Winning coach: Murray Armstrong (5th title)
- MOP: Keith Magnuson (Denver)

The 1969 NCAA Division I men's ice hockey tournament was the culmination of the 1968–69 NCAA University Division men's ice hockey season, the 22nd such tournament in NCAA history. It was held between March 13 and 15, 1969, and concluded with Denver defeating Cornell 4–3. Three games were played at the Broadmoor World Arena in Colorado Springs, Colorado while the consolation game was played at the newly opened Cadet Ice Arena.

This was the first time that the NCAA tournament did not take place entirely at one venue, an event that did not occur again until the tournament expanded to include a play-in game in 1977.

This was the 11th and final time that the Broadmoor World Arena played host to the NCAA tournament. The arena that has held the second most championships is the Dunkin' Donuts Center (previously the Providence Civic Center) with 6 (as of 2016).

== Qualifying teams ==
Four teams qualified for the tournament, two each from the eastern and western regions. The ECAC tournament champion and the two WCHA tournament co-champions received automatic bids into the tournament. An at-large bid was offered to a second eastern team based upon both their ECAC tournament finish as well as their regular season record.

East							West						
Seed	School	Conference	Record	Berth type	Appearance	Last bid	Seed	School	Conference	Record	Berth type	Appearance	Last bid
1	Cornell	ECAC Hockey	26–1–0	Tournament champion	3rd	1968	1	Denver	WCHA	24–6–0	Tournament co-champion	8th	1968
2	Harvard	ECAC Hockey	18–7–1	At-Large	4th	1958	2	Michigan Tech	WCHA	21–7–1	Tournament co-champion	5th	1965

== Format ==
The ECAC champion was seeded as the top eastern team while the WCHA co-champion with the better regular season record was given the top western seed. The second eastern seed was slotted to play the top western seed and vice versa. Both semifinal games and the championship game were played at the Broadmoor World Arena while the consolation match was held at the Cadet Ice Arena. All matches were Single-game eliminations with the semifinal winners advancing to the national championship game and the losers playing in a consolation game.

== Bracket ==
Semifinals; March 13–14
W1	Denver	9
E2	Harvard	2
E1	Cornell	4*
W2	Michigan Tech	3

National championship March 15
W1	Denver	4
E1	Cornell	3
Third-place game
E2	Harvard	6**
W2	Michigan Tech	5

Note: * denotes overtime period(s)

=== Semifinals ===
==== (W1) Denver vs. (E2) Harvard ====
March 13	Denver	9 – 2	Harvard	Broadmoor World Arena	Recap
(Gilmore) Trevor Powis - 03:07 (Trembecky) Craig Patrick - 03:31		First period	00:29 - Ron Mark (Bauer); 15:18 - George McManama (Gurry)
(Powis, Jonasson) Tom Gilmore - PP GW - 03:53 (unassisted) Rich Blanche - SH - 09:12 (Magnuson) Bob Trembecky - 11:28 (Patrick, Magnuson) Bob Trembecky - 17:00		Second period	No scoring
(Blanche, Morrison) Tom Miller - 06:58 (Jonasson, Miller) Keith Magnuson - 07:49 (Powis, Gilmore) George Morrison - 12:46		Third period	No scoring
(22 saves / 24 shots) Gerry Powers (1 save / 1 shot) Frank Daly		Goalie stats	Bruce Durno (31 saves / 40 shots)

==== (E1) Cornell vs. (W2) Michigan Tech ====
March 14	Cornell	4 – 3	OT	Michigan Tech	Broadmoor World Arena	Recap
(Lodboa, Pattison) Brian McCutcheon - 01:21 (McGuinn) Gordon Lowe - 01:55 (Coviello) Bob Aitchison - 05:21		First period		00:07 - Al Karlander (Schillington)
No scoring		Second period		No scoring
No scoring		Third period		10:01 - Al Karlander (Schillington); 13:02 - Al Karlander (Moffat, Hinton)
(unassisted) Gordon Lowe - GW - 01:40		First overtime period		No scoring
( 43 saves / 46 shots ) Ken Dryden		Goalie stats		Gord McRae ( 38 saves / 42 shots )

=== Consolation Game ===
==== (E2) Harvard vs. (W2) Michigan Tech ====
March 15	Harvard	6 – 5	2OT	Michigan Tech	Cadet Ice Arena	Recap
(Bauer, Mark) George McManama - 00:22 (DeMichele, Freeman) Joe Cavanagh - 06:13 (Bauer) Ron Mark - 09:37 (Owen, Flaman) Dan DeMichele - PP - 16:16		First period		01:12 - Brian Watts (Hanies, Ahlsten); 12:24 - SH - George Bell (unassisted)
No scoring		Second period		03:36 - John Haines (Watts); 11:22 - Terry McKnight (Kryway, Bell)
(Mark, McManama) Bobby Bauer - 07:55		Third period		04:04 - Carl Ahlsten (Watts)
(Turco) Chris Gurry - GW - 08:53		Second overtime period		No scoring
(47 saves / 52 shots) Bill Diercks		Goalie stats		Gord McRae (37 saves / 43 shots)

=== National Championship ===
==== (W1) Denver vs. (E1) Cornell ====
March 15	Denver	4 – 3	Cornell	Broadmoor World Arena

Scoring summary
Period	Team	Goal	Assist(s)	Time	Score
1st	DEN	Tom Gilmore	Powis and Magnuson	2:41	1–0 DEN
1st	COR	Dan Lodboa	Pattison	13:09	1–1
2nd	DEN	George Morrison - PP	Miller and Magnuson	30:25	2–1 DEN
2nd	COR	Brian Cornell	Tufford	33:31	2–2
3rd	DEN	Bob Trembecky	Magnuson and Patrick	44:17	3–2 DEN
3rd	DEN	Tom Miller - GW	Zeman	51:50	4–2 DEN
3rd	COR	Gordon Lowe	Giullani	58:40	4–3 DEN
Penalty summary
Period	Team	Player	Penalty	Time	PIM
1st	COR	Gordon Lowe	Hooking	6:04	2:00
1st	DEN	Tom Gilmore	Tripping	11:27	2:00
2nd	COR	Kevin Pettit	Delay of game	23:59	2:00
2nd	DEN	Dale Zeman	Slashing	27:19	2:00
2nd	COR	William Duthie	Offensive checking	27:19	2:00
2nd	COR	William Duthie	Interference	29:31	2:00
2nd	DEN	Keith Magnuson	Holding	36:44	2:00
3rd	DEN	Gerry Jonasson	Tripping	53:11	2:00
3rd	COR	Dan Lodboa	Roughing	57:43	2:00
3rd	DEN	Dale Zeman	Roughing	57:43	2:00

Shots by period
Team	1	2	3	T
Cornell	12	9	15	36
Denver	9	9	7	25

Goaltenders
Team	Name	Saves	Goals against	Time on ice
COR	Ken Dryden	21	4	
DEN	Gerry Powers	33	3	

== All-Tournament team ==
=== First Team ===
- G: Gerry Powers (Denver)
- D: Keith Magnuson* (Denver)
- D: Bruce Pattison (Cornell)
- F: Brian Cornell (Cornell)
- F: Tom Miller (Denver)
- F: Bob Trembecky (Denver)

* Most Outstanding Player(s)

=== Second Team ===
- G: Ken Dryden (Cornell)
- D: Tim Gould (Denver)
- D: Steve Giuliani (Cornell)
- F: Al Karlander (Michigan Tech)
- F: Ron Mark (Harvard)
- F: Peter Tufford (Cornell)
