= Catherine McKenna =

Canadian politician (born 1971)

The Honourable Catherine McKenna PC
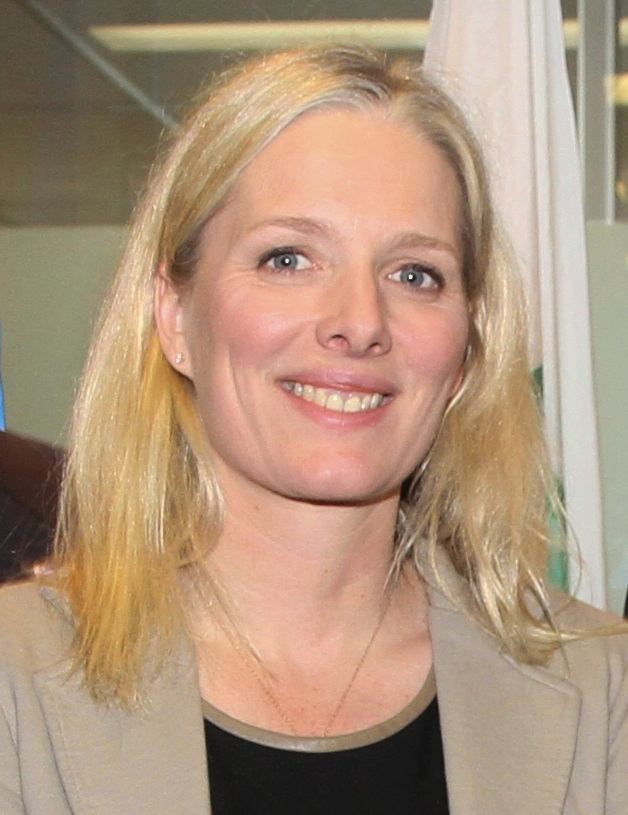
- McKenna in 2016

Minister of Infrastructure and Communities
- In office November 20, 2019 – October 26, 2021
- Prime Minister: Justin Trudeau
- Preceded by: François-Philippe Champagne
- Succeeded by: Dominic LeBlanc (as Minister of Intergovernmental Affairs, Infrastructure and Communities)

Minister of Environment and Climate Change
- In office November 4, 2015 – November 20, 2019
- Prime Minister: Justin Trudeau
- Preceded by: Leona Aglukkaq
- Succeeded by: Jonathan Wilkinson

Member of Parliament for Ottawa Centre
- In office October 19, 2015 – September 20, 2021
- Preceded by: Paul Dewar
- Succeeded by: Yasir Naqvi

Personal details
- Born: Catherine Mary McKenna; August 5, 1971 (age 55) Hamilton, Ontario, Canada
- Party: Liberal
- Spouse: Scott Gilmore (sep. 2019) Peter MacLeod (m. 2024)
- Children: 3
- Education: University of Toronto (BA); London School of Economics (MSc); McGill University (LLB)
- Profession: Lawyer
- Website: climateandnature.com

Catherine Mary McKenna PC (born August 5, 1971) is a Canadian lawyer and former politician who was Minister of Environment and Climate Change from 2015 to 2019 and Minister of Infrastructure and Communities from 2019 to 2021. A member of the Liberal Party, McKenna was the member of Parliament (MP) for Ottawa Centre from 2015 to 2021.

After leaving politics, McKenna founded the Climate and Nature Solutions advisory firm, became a visiting fellow at Columbia University, and served as the chair of the United Nations High-Level Expert Group on the Net-Zero Emissions Commitments of Non-State Entities.

== Early life and career ==
McKenna was born on August 5, 1971, in Hamilton, Ontario. She is the eldest of four children of Dr. John McKenna, an Irish dentist and his Quebec-born wife Pat McKenna, who lived in the southwest part of Hamilton.

After graduating from École élémentaire catholique Notre-Dame (her father insisted that all his children be bilingual despite not knowing any French himself), McKenna attended Saint Mary Catholic Secondary School.

McKenna earned her undergraduate degree in French and international relations from St. Michael's College at the University of Toronto, graduating in 1994. She was the captain of the Varsity Blues' swim team, won three of the four Canadian Interuniversity Athletics Union events she attended with her team, and reached the Canadian Olympics trials for swimming at the 1988 Summer Olympics. After graduating from the University of Toronto, she travelled through south-east Asia and co-produced a travel documentary with her friend, Stephen Hulford. McKenna earned a master's degree in international relations from the London School of Economics.

=== Legal career ===
Between 1996 and 1999, McKenna studied law at McGill University before beginning her legal career in Jakarta, Indonesia at the firm, SSEK where she focused on international trade, investment and constitutional issues. In 2001, she moved to East Timor where she spent a year as a senior negotiator with the United Nations peacekeeping mission in East Timor which culminated in the Timor Sea Treaty providing for the joint exploitation of petroleum resources in a part of the Timor Sea.

She returned to Canada in 2002, where she joined Stikeman Elliott, working in the areas of competition, trade, and constitutional law. During this time she was senior counsel on the review of Canada's military justice system, headed by Antonio Lamer, former chief justice of Canada.

In 2005, McKenna co-founded Canadian Lawyers Abroad - Avocats canadiens à l'étranger (CLA-ACE), now called Level Justice, a University of Ottawa-based charity that helps Canadian law students and law firms do pro bono legal work in developing countries. Level Justice works to reduce barriers to justice by uniting the power of people, education and law will lead to create a more equitable and just society.

She remains a member of the bars of Ontario and New York State.

== Political career ==
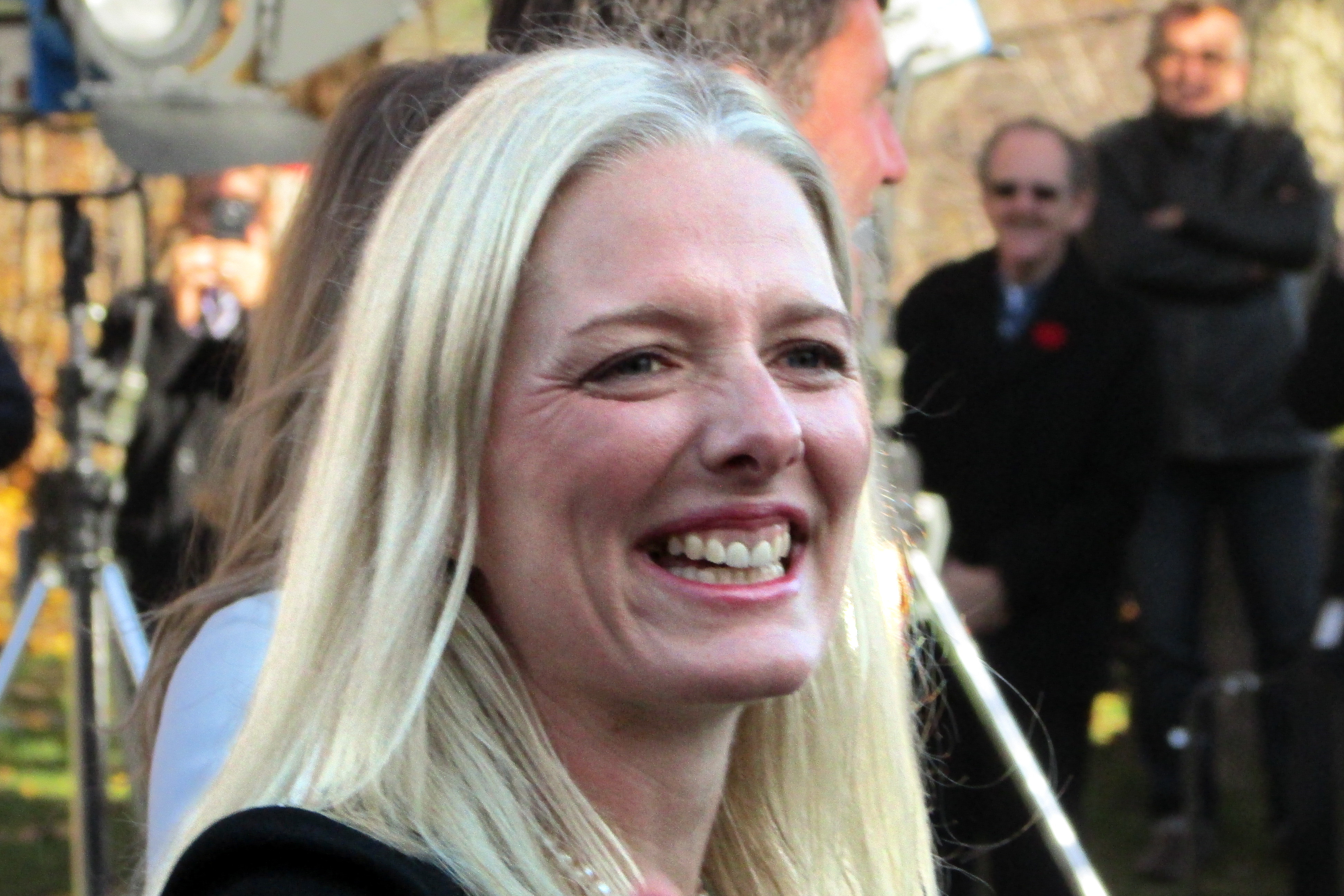
McKenna on November 4, 2015, shortly before being sworn into cabinet

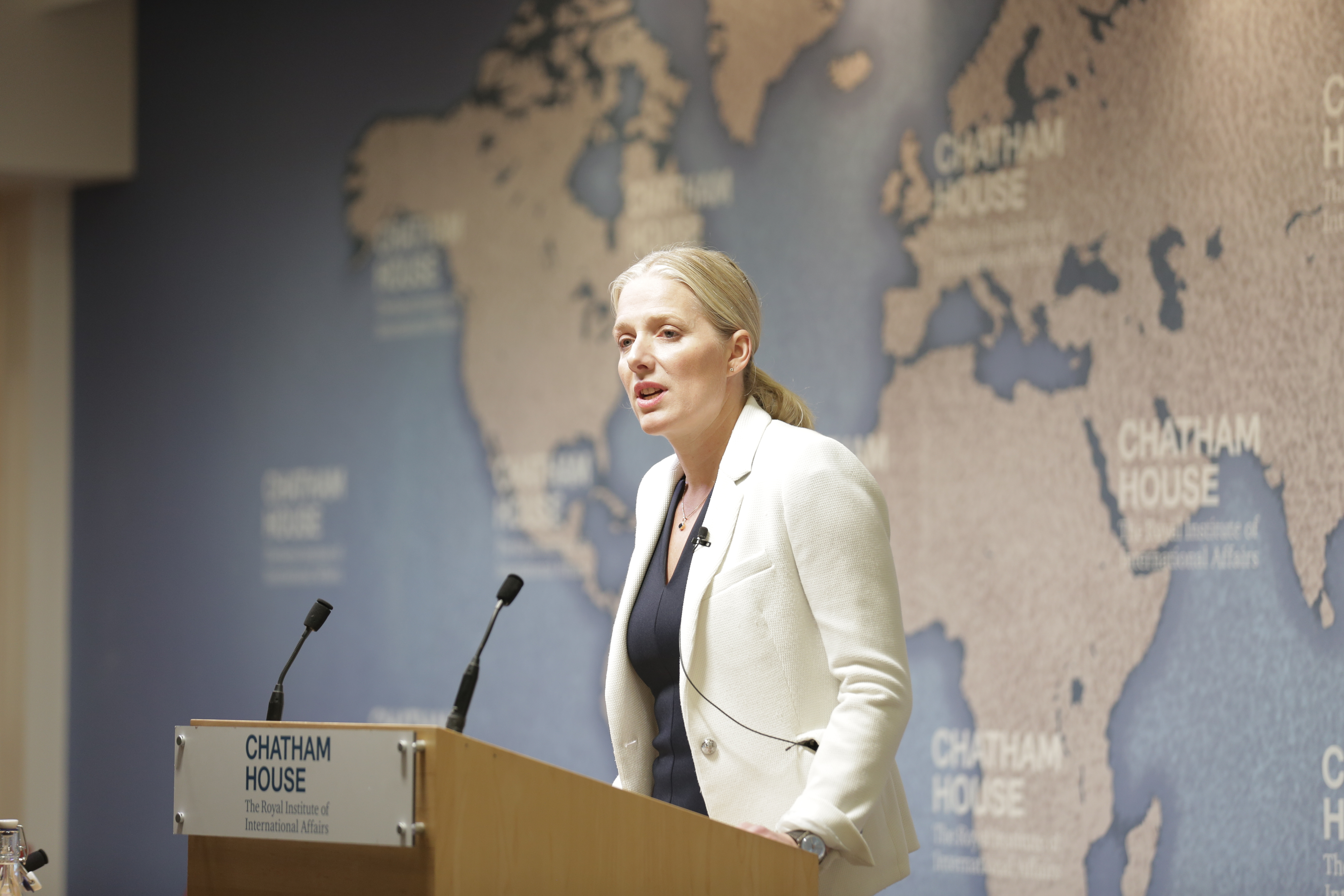
McKenna speaking at Chatham House in 2017

In the 2015 federal election, McKenna defeated longtime New Democratic Party (NDP) MP Paul Dewar in the riding of Ottawa Centre. McKenna said that she knocked on 100,000 doors during her 522 days as a candidate. McKenna was elected with 43 per cent of the votes compared to Dewar's 38 per cent, and had campaigned on issues such as reforming the National Capital Commission, funding for a new main branch of the Ottawa Public Library, and opposing the proposed Memorial to the Victims of Communism.

McKenna was one of 50 women elected to the Liberal caucus in the 2015 election.

=== Minister of Environment and Climate Change ===
As Canada’s former Minister of the Environment and Climate Change she was a lead negotiator of the 2015 Paris Agreement (in particular Article 6 concerning carbon markets). In 2016, she announced the Pan-Canadian Framework on Clean Growth and Climate Change with the provinces, territories and Indigenous communities. In 2018, the carbon pricing scheme was implemented by the Greenhouse Gas Pollution Pricing Act, which was upheld at the Supreme Court in 2021. She also led efforts to phase out coal, reduce plastics in oceans and waterways, and doubled the amount of nature protected in Canada in partnership with Indigenous Peoples.

While in government, she helped establish the Powering Past Coal Alliance (with Canada, the UK and Bloomberg Philanthropies), the Ministerial on Climate Action (with Canada, the UK and China), the Women Kicking it on Climate Summit and the Nature Champions Summit, was Co-Chair of the World Bank's Carbon Pricing Leadership Coalition, and helped develop the Ocean Plastics Charter adopted at the G7 hosted by Canada in 2018.

Rebel News derisively nicknamed her "Climate Barbie", a label McKenna considers a sexist insult. Conservative MP Gerry Ritz caused controversy in September 2017 when he tweeted a link to a news story stating no industrialized nations were on pace to meet Paris Agreement carbon emission targets with the comment "Has anyone told our climate Barbie! [sic]" (referring to McKenna). Ritz eventually deleted the original post, afterward posted another message stating: "I apologize for the use of Barbie, it is not reflective of the role the Minister plays". Conservative leader Andrew Scheer condemned Ritz's comment later in the day and stated he would reach out to McKenna personally to "assure the minister that this type of behavior has no place in the Conservative caucus".

In May 2018, the Trudeau government's decision to buy the Trans Mountain pipeline for $4.5 billion was criticized by environmental activists as contrary to its climate change plans.

In November 2018, in response to the Government of Ontario's decision to cancel all climate action projects supported through the federal Low Carbon Economy Fund, McKenna announced that the Government of Canada would work directly with businesses to re-invest the $200-million remaining in the province's Low Carbon Economy Fund.

In 2017, McKenna was named in a lawsuit by environmental groups, including Ecojustice and the Canadian Association of Physicians for the Environment, for her ministry's decision not to pursue charges against Volkswagen Canada in the wake of the Volkswagen emissions scandal. The applicants alleged that the Minister failed to properly enforce the Canadian Environmental Protection Act, 1999 and sought to compel the government to investigate and prosecute the company.

=== Minister of Infrastructure and Communities ===
After the 2019 federal election, McKenna was appointed as the minister of infrastructure and communities in November 2019. The same month, she was the keynote speaker at the Federation of Canadian Municipalities conference. As Minister of Infrastructure and Communities, she made historic investments in public transit and green infrastructure, leveraged private sector investment through the Canada Infrastructure Bank, and led the development of Canada’s first National Infrastructure Assessment to drive to net-zero emissions by 2050.

In 2019, McKenna was provided with a Royal Canadian Mounted Police security detail over verbal harassment issues. On October 24, 2019, her office was defaced with a misogynistic slur.

In a March 2021 report, the Auditor General of Canada, Karen Hogan, criticized McKenna's ministry for its incomprehensive and inconsistent reporting. The auditor-general found that the ministry could not account for over 8,500 projects and $92 billion in government investment. McKenna stated that it was something that needed to be fixed and she understood that "Canadians must be able to see the benefits of their hard-earned tax dollars."

In late June 2021, McKenna announced she would not seek re-election to her seat in Parliament. Following the 2021 federal election, she was succeeded as MP by Yasir Naqvi, a Liberal who served as the attorney general of Ontario in the provincial government of Kathleen Wynne.

== Post-political career ==
After leaving politics, McKenna founded Climate and Nature Solutions, an advisory firm that works with governments, corporations, foundations and universities to scale practical climate and nature-based solutions. She also joined Columbia University's Centre on Global Energy Policy and Climate School. In 2022, she chaired the United Nations High-Level Expert Group on the Net-Zero Emissions Commitments of Non-State Entities which issued the landmark report, Integrity Matters: Net Zero Commitments by Businesses, Financial Institutions, Cities and Regions, in November 2022.

In June 2023, McKenna was made a Chevalier of the French Legion of Honour for her contributions to negotiating the Paris Agreement and other climate change diplomacy. In May 2024, she received an Honorary Doctorate from McMaster University in Hamilton, Ontario.

In September 2025, McKenna published Run Like A Girl, a memoir in scrapbook-like form.

== Personal life ==
McKenna was married to entrepreneur and policy advisor Scott Gilmore, with whom she moved to The Glebe, Ottawa in 2002, until separating in 2019. Together, they have three children. In 2024, she married MASS LBP founder Peter MacLeod. McKenna still swims as a hobby; in 2015, she competed as part of the National Capital YMCA Masters Swim Team.

== Electoral record ==
2019 Canadian federal election: Ottawa Centre
| Party | Candidate | Votes | % | ±% | Expenditures |
|---|---|---|---|---|---|
| Liberal | Catherine McKenna | 38,391 | 48.66 | +5.99 | $113,154.09 |
| New Democratic | Emilie Taman | 22,916 | 29.04 | -9.50 | $119,073.61 |
| Conservative | Carol Clemenhagen | 9,920 | 12.57 | -1.92 | $63,743.89 |
| Green | Angela Keller-Herzog | 5,837 | 7.40 | +4.42 | none listed |
| People's | Merylee Sevilla | 720 | 0.91 | – | $2,536.21 |
| Libertarian | Coreen Corcoran | 360 | 0.46 | -0.27 | $1,030.86 |
| Animal Protection | Shelby Bertrand | 207 | 0.26 | – | none listed |
| Christian Heritage | Marie-Chantal Leriche | 198 | 0.25 | – | none listed |
| Independent | Chris G. Jones | 177 | 0.22 | – | $3,526.62 |
| Communist | Stuart Ryan | 111 | 0.14 | -0.02 | $496.90 |
| Independent | Giang Ha Thu Vo | 65 | 0.08 | – | none listed |
| Total valid votes/expense limit | | 78,902 | 99.39 | | |
| Total rejected ballots | | 482 | 0.61 | +0.10 | |
| Turnout | | 79,384 | 78.43 | -1.57 | |
| Eligible voters | | 101,219 | | | |
| Liberal hold | | Swing | | +7.74 | |
Source: Elections Canada

2015 Canadian federal election: Ottawa Centre
| Party | Candidate | Votes | % | ±% | Expenditures |
|---|---|---|---|---|---|
| Liberal | Catherine McKenna | 32,111 | 42.66 | +22.54 | $192,865.14 |
| New Democratic | Paul Dewar | 29,098 | 38.54 | −13.62 | $196,692.80 |
| Conservative | Damian Konstantinakos | 10,943 | 14.49 | −7.14 | $74,191.60 |
| Green | Tom Milroy | 2,246 | 2.97 | −2.06 | $5,564.56 |
| Libertarian | Dean T. Harris | 551 | 0.73 | – | – |
| Rhinoceros | Conrad Lukawski | 167 | 0.22 | – | $2.96 |
| Marijuana | John Andrew Omowole Akpata | 160 | 0.21 | – | – |
| Communist | Stuart Ryan | 124 | 0.16 | – | – |
| Total valid votes/Expense limit | | 75,500 | 100.00 | | $233,540.54 |
| Total rejected ballots | | 386 | 0.51 | – | |
| Turnout | | 75,886 | 82.82 | – | |
| Eligible voters | | 91,625 | | | |
| Liberal gain from New Democratic | | Swing | | +18.08 | |
Source: Elections Canada

29th Canadian Ministry (2015–2025) – Cabinet of Justin Trudeau
Cabinet posts (2)
| Predecessor | Office | Successor |
|---|---|---|
| François-Philippe Champagne | Minister of Infrastructure and Communities; November 20, 2019 – October 26, 2021 | Dominic LeBlanc |
| Leona Aglukkaq | Minister of the Environment and Climate Change; November 4, 2015 – November 20, 2019 | Jonathan Wilkinson |
