= Tom Gilmore (ice hockey) =

Canadian ice hockey player

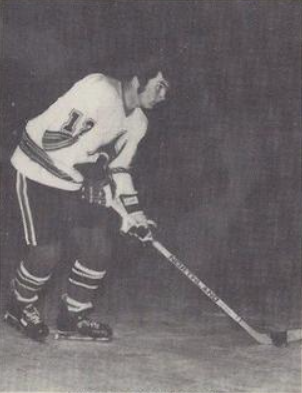
- Gilmore in 1972 photo
- Born: May 14, 1948 (age 78) Flin Flon, Manitoba, Canada
- Height: 5 ft 11 in (180 cm)
- Weight: 190 lb (86 kg; 13 st 8 lb)
- Position: Left wing
- Shot: Left
- Played for: Los Angeles Sharks; Edmonton Oilers
- Playing career: 1970–1975

Tom Gilmore (born May 14, 1948) is a Canadian retired professional ice hockey forward who played a total of 202 games in the World Hockey Association with the Los Angeles Sharks and the Edmonton Oilers.

== Early life ==
Gilmore was born in Flin Flon, Manitoba. Gilmore played major junior with the Flin Flon Bombers, then was captain of the University of Denver Pioneers hockey team when they won the consecutive 1968 and 1969 NCAA Division I Men's Ice Hockey Tournaments.

== Career statistics ==
=== Regular season and playoffs ===
			Regular season					Playoffs
Season	Team	League	GP	G	A	Pts	PIM	GP	G	A	Pts	PIM
1967–68	University of Denver	WCHA	Statistics Unavailable
1969–70	University of Denver	WCHA	Statistics Unavailable
1970–71	Fort Worth Wings	CHL	61	11	10	21	139	4	0	2	2	12
1971–72	Tidewater Wings	AHL	76	30	31	61	141	––	––	––	––	––
1972–73	Los Angeles Sharks	WHA	71	17	18	35	191	5	1	3	4	2
1973–74	Edmonton Oilers	WHA	57	19	23	42	164	5	1	4	5	15
1974–75	Edmonton Oilers	WHA	74	12	19	31	84	––	––	––	––	––
WHA totals			202	48	60	108	439	10	2	7	9	17

== Personal life ==
Gilmore is married to Collette Gilmore and they have two children, Scott Gilmore, one of the founders of Peace Dividend Trust, and Patrick Gilmore, a film and television actor.

== Awards and honors ==
Award	Year
All-WCHA Second team	1969–70
