= Stephen Hulford =

Canadian businessperson (born 1971)

- Born: 1971 (age 54–55); Portsmouth, England
- Education: University of Toronto (BA)
- Occupations: Businessperson, entrepreneur
- Known for: co-founder of Filemobile
- Notable work: What If, How to Survive

Stephen Hulford (born 1971) is a Canadian businessperson and marathon swimmer. He is the co-founder and chief executive officer of Underknown, a Toronto-based digital producer of science and educational content. Previously, he co-founded Filemobile and served as its chief creative officer until 2015.

== Early life and education ==
Hulford was born in 1971 in Portsmouth, England. He attended the University of Toronto, where he was a member of the varsity swimming team. In 1994, his athleticism was recognized with the University of Toronto's T-Holders' Award as the male athlete of the year. He represented Canada at international competitions such as the Pan American Games, FINA Swimming World Cup, and World University Championships. He graduated from the University of Toronto's New College with a degree in arts and sciences.

== Career ==
Early in his career, Hulford worked as a documentarian. In 1995, he produced Real Travel: 60 Days in Indonesia, a travel documentary filmed over two months in Indonesia. The project was completed with the assistance of Catherine McKenna, who was credited as an associate producer. Later, he worked as vice-president of sports products for the Canadian sports broadcasters TSN and RDS.

In 2005, Hulford and Ron Watson acquired PoolExpert, a fantasy sports website established in 1999. PoolExpert was eventually acquired by Rogers Media in 2008. In 2005, Hulford co-founded Filemobile, a software-as-a-service (SaaS) platform for user-generated content. One application of Filemobile's technology was a CTV mobile app for citizen journalism. In January 2015, the Australian company Newzulu acquired Filemobile. As part of the acquisition, Hulford joined Newzulu's executive management team.

In the mid-2010s, Hulford co-founded the digital media company Underknown Inc., which produces educational video content. Underknown's series, including What If and How to Survive, are distributed on social media and streaming platforms.

In May 2020, Hulford led a five-hour global livestream Live Med Aid that raised funds for Médecins Sans Frontières' COVID-19 response; the programme combined conversations with scientists such as Jane Goodall, David Suzuki, Wade_Davis, Katherine Hayhoe, and Neil deGrasse Tyson with performances by Earth, Wind & Fire, Barenaked Ladies, Metric, Bombino, Ed Robertson and others.

In January 2021, after COVID-19 restrictions closed local pools, Hulford and his daughter Kate moved their Olympic-focused training to the open waters of Lake Ontario, where they swam year-round despite frigid conditions, often joined in the summer by displaced swimming club members.

Steve Hulford swam around Manhattan Island (49km , 29 miles) on August 16th, 2025 in 9 hours and 10 minutes.
