= Keith Magnuson =

Canadian ice hockey player (1947–2003)

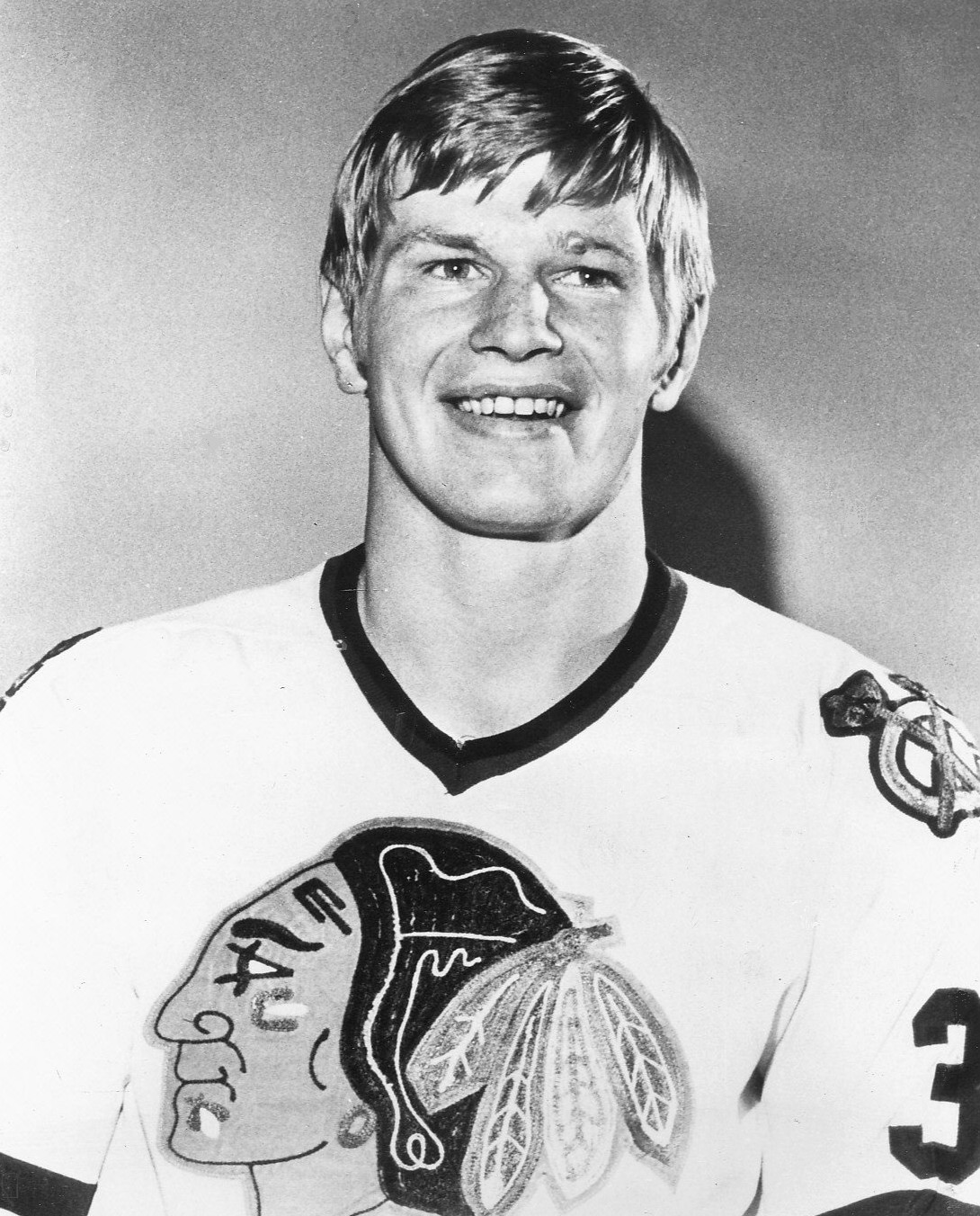
- Magnuson with the Chicago Black Hawks in 1973
- Born: April 27, 1947 Wadena, Saskatchewan, Canada
- Died: December 15, 2003 (aged 56) Vaughan, Ontario, Canada
- Height: 6 ft 0 in (183 cm)
- Weight: 185 lb (84 kg; 13 st 3 lb)
- Position: Defence
- Shot: Right
- Played for: Chicago Black Hawks
- Playing career: 1969–1979

Keith Arlen Magnuson (April 27, 1947 – December 15, 2003) was a Canadian professional ice hockey defenceman from Wadena, Saskatchewan who played in the National Hockey League (NHL) between 1969 and 1979.

Magnuson played 589 career NHL games, all with the Chicago Black Hawks, wearing # 3, and scoring 14 goals and 125 assists for 139 points. Although he did not score many goals, he was a part of a solid defensive team with the Blackhawks. Perhaps his most telling statistic is his 1,442 career penalty minutes, which included many fighting majors. For a few seasons, Magnuson was captain of the Chicago Blackhawks team. In April 1970, he appeared on the cover of Sports Illustrated. In 1971 and 1972, Magnuson played in the National Hockey League All-Star Game. He never played for a Stanley Cup winner, losing in the finals twice in 1971 and 1973 both to the Montreal Canadiens. Prior to his NHL career, Magnuson was a two time All-American at the University of Denver, who led his team to two consecutive NCAA titles in 1968 and 1969.

Magnuson was the great-uncle to Major League Baseball pitcher Trystan Magnuson and uncle to former Canadian Football League player, Quinn Magnuson. His son Kevin was a member of the 1998 NCAA Ice Hockey Championship team at the University of Michigan and is now a NHLPA registered player agent and lawyer.

Magnuson was killed in an auto accident in Vaughan, Ontario. Fellow NHL alumnus Rob Ramage was behind the wheel (Ramage survived the accident and later found guilty of impaired driving causing death).

== Life ==
Magnuson grew up in Wadena, Saskatchewan. His family moved to Saskatoon when he was 10 years old. When he was seventeen he played for the Saskatoon Blades, before he received a hockey scholarship to the University of Denver. Magnuson joined the Chicago Black Hawks for the 1969–70 season and led the league in penalty minutes in his first two seasons. He became an assistant coach for the Black Hawks after retiring in 1979 and was promoted to head coach for the 1980–81 season.

== Death ==
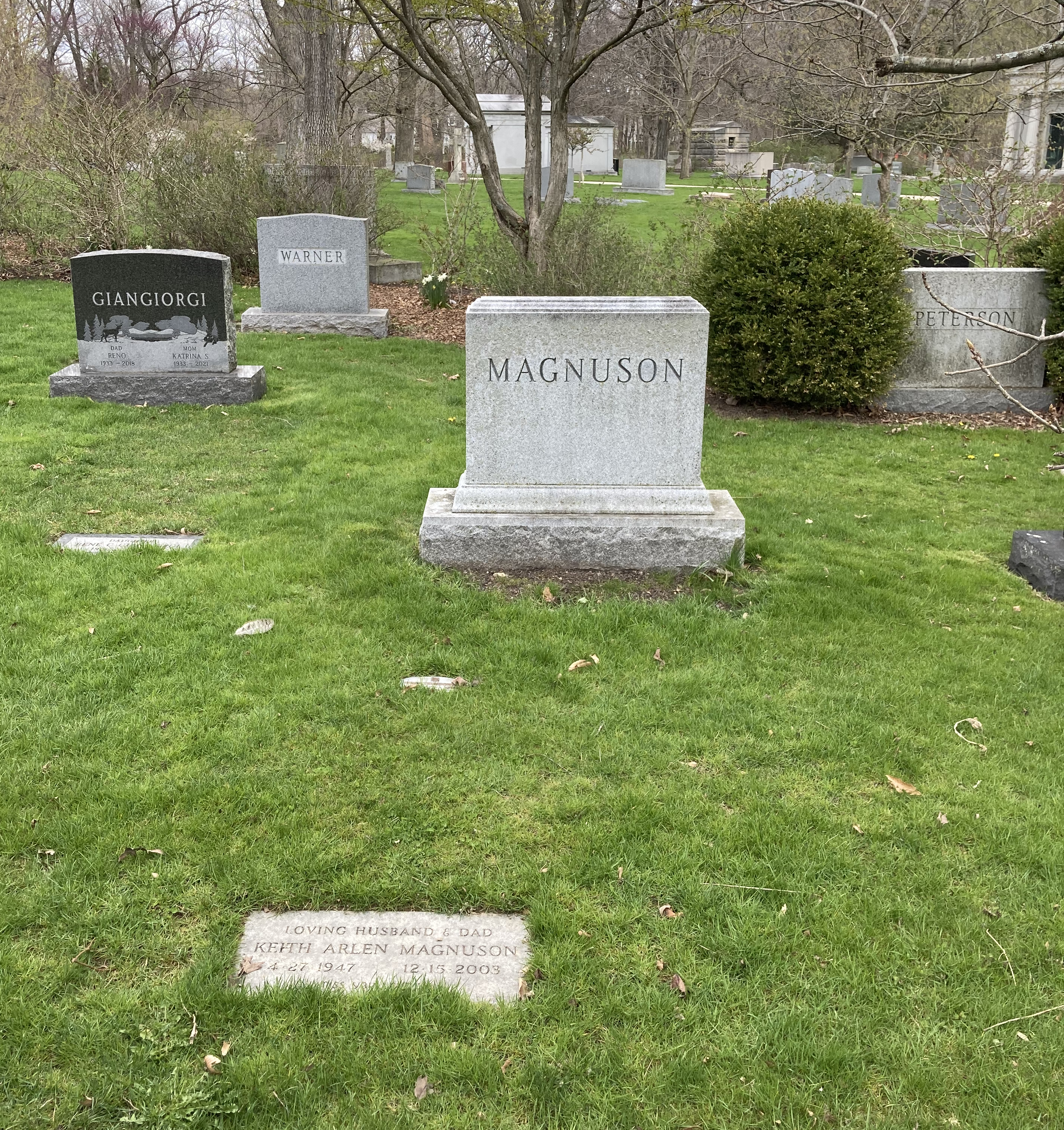
Magnuson's grave at Lake Forest Cemetery

On December 15, 2003, Rob Ramage was driving Magnuson to an NHLPA players' alumni meeting when his rented Chrysler Intrepid swerved into the oncoming lane and collided with another vehicle, killing Magnuson and injuring the driver of the other vehicle. Ramage was charged with impaired driving causing death and dangerous driving causing death. Defence lawyer Brian Greenspan claimed the blood and urine tests were flawed, and the smell of alcohol came from beer cans that exploded after the crash.

Magnuson was buried at Lake Forest Cemetery in Illinois.

On November 12, 2008, the Chicago Blackhawks retired Magnuson's number 3, along with that of Hall of Fame defenceman Pierre Pilote, before a game against the Boston Bruins.

== Awards and honours ==
- Played in 1971 and 1972 NHL All-Star Game

Award	Year
All-WCHA First Team	1966–67; 1967–68; 1968–69
AHCA West All-American	1967–68; 1968–69
All-NCAA All-Tournament First Team	1968, 1969

== Career statistics ==
			Regular season					Playoffs
Season	Team	League	GP	G	A	Pts	PIM	GP	G	A	Pts	PIM
1964–65	Saskatoon Blades	SJHL	54	9	2	11	77	5	0	2	2	6
1965–66	University of Denver	WCHA	—	—	—	—	—	—	—	—	—	—
1966–67	University of Denver	WCHA	30	4	17	21	56	—	—	—	—	—
1967–68	University of Denver	WCHA	34	5	15	20	59	—	—	—	—	—
1968–69	University of Denver	WCHA	32	7	27	34	48	—	—	—	—	—
1969–70	Chicago Black Hawks	NHL	76	0	24	24	213	8	1	2	3	17
1970–71	Chicago Black Hawks	NHL	76	3	20	23	291	18	0	2	2	63
1971–72	Chicago Black Hawks	NHL	74	2	19	21	201	8	0	1	1	29
1972–73	Chicago Black Hawks	NHL	77	0	19	19	140	7	0	2	2	4
1973–74	Chicago Black Hawks	NHL	57	2	11	13	105	11	1	0	1	17
1974–75	Chicago Black Hawks	NHL	48	2	12	14	117	8	1	2	3	15
1975–76	Chicago Black Hawks	NHL	48	1	6	7	99	4	0	0	0	12
1976–77	Chicago Black Hawks	NHL	37	1	6	7	86	—	—	—	—	—
1977–78	Chicago Black Hawks	NHL	67	2	4	6	145	4	0	0	0	7
1978–79	Chicago Black Hawks	NHL	26	1	4	5	41	—	—	—	—	—
1979–80	Chicago Black Hawks	NHL	3	0	0	0	4	—	—	—	—	—
NHL totals			589	14	125	139	1442	68	3	9	12	164

== Coaching record ==
Team	Year	Regular season						Postseason
Team	Year	G	W	L	T	Pts	Division rank	Result
CHI	1980–81	80	31	33	16	78	2nd in Smythe	Lost in first round
CHI	1981–82	52	18	24	10	46	4th in Norris	Fired
Total		132	49	57	26	124		

Awards and achievements
Preceded by Gary Gambucci	WCHA Sophomore of the Year; 1966–67 with Bob Munro	Succeeded by Murray McLachlan
Preceded by Keith Christiansen	WCHA Most Valuable Player; 1967–68	Succeeded by Murray McLachlan
Preceded by Gerry Powers	NCAA Tournament Most Outstanding Player; 1969	Succeeded by Dan Lodboa
Sporting positions
Preceded by Pit Martin; Stan Mikita	Chicago Black Hawks captain 1976–79	Succeeded by Terry Ruskowski
Preceded by Eddie Johnston	Head coach of the Chicago Black Hawks; 1980–82	Succeeded by Bob Pulford
