= Jim Shires =

Canadian ice hockey player

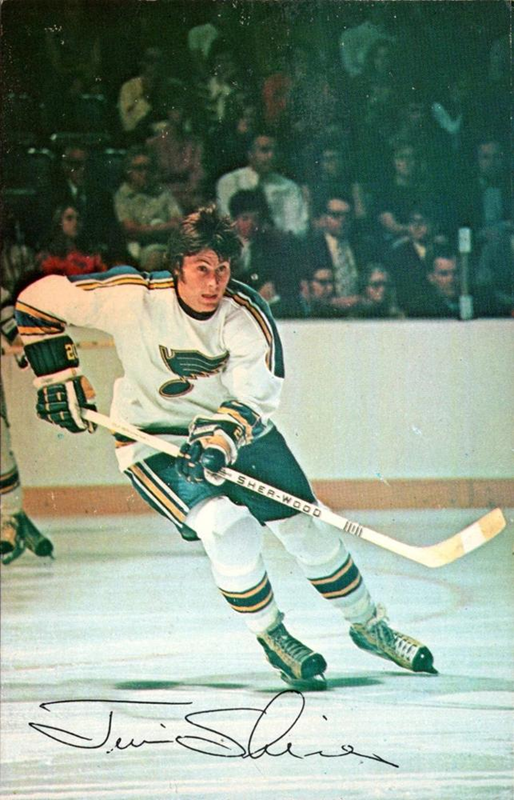
- Born: November 15, 1945 (age 80) Edmonton, Alberta, Canada
- Height: 6 ft 0 in (183 cm)
- Weight: 180 lb (82 kg; 12 st 12 lb)
- Position: Left wing
- Shot: Left
- Played for: St. Louis Blues; Detroit Red Wings; Pittsburgh Penguins
- Playing career: 1968–1975

James Arthur Shires (born November 15, 1945) is a Canadian retired professional ice hockey winger who played 56 games in the National Hockey League with the St. Louis Blues, Detroit Red Wings, and Pittsburgh Penguins between 1970 and 1973. The rest of his career, which lasted from 1968 to 1975, was spent in the minor leagues. He played college hockey for the University of Denver.

== Career statistics ==
=== Regular season and playoffs ===
			Regular season					Playoffs
Season	Team	League	GP	G	A	Pts	PIM	GP	G	A	Pts	PIM
1963–64	Edmonton Oil Kings	CAHL	2	0	0	0	4	—	—	—	—	—
1964–65	University of Denver	WCHA	—	—	—	—	—	—	—	—	—	—
1965–66	University of Denver	WCHA	26	8	10	18	18	—	—	—	—	—
1966–67	University of Denver	WCHA	30	8	19	27	39	—	—	—	—	—
1967–68	University of Denver	WCHA	34	15	23	38	43	—	—	—	—	—
1968–69	Omaha Knights	CHL	9	0	2	2	4	—	—	—	—	—
1968–69	Denver Spurs	WHL	20	2	2	4	6	—	—	—	—	—
1968–69	Amarillo Wranglers	CHL	34	10	18	28	43	—	—	—	—	—
1969–70	Fort Worth Wings	CHL	69	16	18	34	61	7	1	1	2	21
1970–71	Detroit Red Wings	NHL	20	2	1	3	22	—	—	—	—	—
1970–71	Fort Worth Wings	CHL	48	13	25	38	97	4	0	0	0	2
1971–72	St. Louis Blues	NHL	18	0	3	3	8	—	—	—	—	—
1971–72	Denver Spurs	WHL	42	18	27	45	82	9	2	3	5	15
1972–73	Pittsburgh Penguins	NHL	18	1	2	3	2	—	—	—	—	—
1972–73	Denver Spurs	WHL	32	10	7	17	45	—	—	—	—	—
1973–74	San Diego Gulls	WHL	68	26	34	60	44	4	2	2	4	0
1974–75	Fort Wayne Komets	IHL	21	3	9	12	12	—	—	—	—	—
CHL totals			160	39	63	102	205	11	1	1	2	23
WHL totals			162	56	70	126	177	13	4	5	9	15
NHL totals			56	3	6	9	32	—	—	—	—	—
