= 1969 WCHA men's ice hockey tournament =

1969 WCHA Men's ice hockey tournament
- Dates: March 6–8, 1969
- Teams: 8
- Finals site: Weinberg Coliseum; Ann Arbor, Michigan; DU Arena; Denver, Colorado
- Champions: Michigan Tech† (4th title); Denver‡ (7th title)
- Winning coach: John MacInnes (4th title); Murray Armstrong (7th title)
- WCHA Men's Ice Hockey Tournaments

The 1969 WCHA men's ice hockey tournament was the 10th conference playoff in league history. The tournament was played between March 6 and March 8, 1969. All East Regional games were played at the Weinberg Coliseum in Ann Arbor, Michigan while West Regional games were held at the DU Arena in Denver, Colorado. By winning the regional tournaments, both the East Regional Champion†, Michigan Tech, and West Regional Champion‡, Denver, were invited to participate in the 1969 NCAA University Division men's ice hockey tournament.

== Format ==
All member teams in the WCHA were eligible for the tournament and were seeded No. 1 through No. 8 according to the final conference standings. The eight teams were then divided into two separate groups by placing all three teams from Michigan in the east region, held at the Weinberg Coliseum, and all teams west of Minnesota in the west region, held at the DU Arena. The remaining two Minnesota-based universities were divided so that Minnesota went into the east region and Minnesota-Duluth went into the west region. Once each regional group was set the teams were reseeded No. 1 to No. 4 according to their final conference standings. In the Second round the first and fourth seeds and the second and third seeds in each region were matched in a single game with the winners advancing to their regional final games. The winners of the two championship games were declared as co-conference tournament champions.

=== Conference standings ===
Note: GP = Games played; W = Wins; L = Losses; T = Ties; PCT = Winning percentage; GF = Goals for; GA = Goals against

1968–69 Western Collegiate Hockey Association standings
	Conference							Overall					
	GP	W	L	T	PCT	GF	GA	GP	W	L	T	GF	GA
Michigan Tech†*	20	14	5	1	.725	86	56	32	21	9	2	144	95
Denver*	20	14	6	0	.700	94	50	32	26	6	0	160	71
North Dakota	22	15	7	0	.682	97	89	29	18	10	1	130	125
Michigan	18	10	8	0	.556	75	63	28	16	12	0	124	101
Minnesota	22	11	9	2	.545	74	60	29	13	13	3	113	96
Michigan State	18	7	10	1	.417	51	57	28	11	16	1	91	123
Colorado College	18	4	14	0	.222	47	94	28	12	16	0	105	121
Minnesota–Duluth	22	3	19	0	.136	64	119	29	6	23	0	91	147
Championship: Michigan Tech, Denver † indicates conference regular season champion * indicates conference tournament champion

== Bracket ==
Regional semifinals March 6–7
E1	Michigan Tech	4
E4	Michigan State	2
East Regional
E2	Michigan	8
E3	Minnesota	4
W1	Denver	4
W4	Minnesota-Duluth	1
West Regional
W2	North Dakota	4
W3	Colorado College	5

Regional Finals; March 8
E1	Michigan Tech	7
E2	Michigan	4
W1	Denver	3
W3	Colorado College	1

Note: * denotes overtime period(s)

== East Regional ==
=== Semifinals ===
==== (1) Michigan Tech vs. (4) Michigan State ====
March 7	Michigan Tech	4 – 2	Michigan State	Weinberg Coliseum

==== (2) Michigan vs. (3) Minnesota ====
March 7	Michigan	8 – 4	Minnesota	Weinberg Coliseum

=== Finals ===
==== (1) Michigan Tech vs. (2) Michigan ====
March 8	Michigan Tech	7 – 4	Michigan	Weinberg Coliseum

== West Regional ==
=== Semifinals ===
==== (1) Denver vs. (4) Minnesota-Duluth ====
March 6	Denver	4 – 1	Minnesota-Duluth	DU Arena

==== (2) North Dakota vs. (3) Colorado College ====
March 7	North Dakota	4 – 5	Colorado College	DU Arena

=== Finals ===
==== (1) Denver vs. (3) Colorado College ====
March 8	Denver	3 – 1	Colorado College	DU Arena

== Tournament awards ==
None

== See also ==
- Western Collegiate Hockey Association men's champions
