= 1968 WCHA men's ice hockey tournament =

American college hockey postseason tournament

1968 WCHA Men's ice hockey tournament
- Dates: March 5–9, 1968
- Teams: 8
- Finals site: Dee Stadium; Houghton, Michigan; DU Arena; Denver, Colorado
- Champions: North Dakota† (2nd title); Denver‡ (6th title)
- Winning coach: Bill Selman (2nd title); Murray Armstrong (6th title)
- WCHA Men's Ice Hockey Tournaments

The 1968 WCHA Men's Ice Hockey Tournament was the 9th conference playoff in league history. The tournament was played between March 5 and March 9, 1968. All games were played at home team campus sites. By being declared as co-champions, both North Dakota and Denver were invited to participate in the 1968 NCAA University Division Men's Ice Hockey Tournament.

Though not official designations, North Dakota is considered as the East Regional Champion† and Denver as the West Regional Champion‡.

== Format ==
All eight teams in the WCHA were eligible for the tournament and were seeded No. 1 through No. 8 according to their final conference standings. In the first round the first and eighth seeds, the second and seventh seeds, the third and sixth seeds and the fourth and fifth seeds played a single game with the winners advancing to the second round. After the first round the remaining teams were reseeded No. 1 through No. 4 according to their final conference standings and advanced to the second round. In the second round the first and fourth seeds and the second and third seeds were matched in two-game series where the school that scored the higher number of goals was declared the winner. The victors of the second round series were declared as co-conference tournament champions.

=== Conference standings ===
Note: GP = Games played; W = Wins; L = Losses; T = Ties; PCT = Winning percentage; GF = Goals for; GA = Goals against

1967–68 Western Collegiate Hockey Association standings
	Conference							Overall					
	GP	W	L	T	PCT	GF	GA	GP	W	L	T	GF	GA
Denver†*	18	15	3	0	.833	84	32	34	28	5	1	183	65
Michigan Tech	20	15	5	0	.750	76	47	32	22	9	1	131	82
North Dakota*	22	13	8	1	.614	78	57	33	20	10	3	113	80
Michigan	18	11	7	0	.611	83	60	27	18	9	0	152	84
Minnesota	22	13	9	0	.591	98	71	31	19	12	0	132	109
Michigan State	20	6	13	1	.325	57	82	29	11	16	2	92	111
Colorado College	20	4	16	0	.200	40	106	29	9	20	0	84	108
Minnesota-Duluth	24	4	20	0	.167	54	109	28	5	23	0	71	144
Championship: North Dakota, Denver † indicates conference regular season champion * indicates conference tournament champion

== Bracket ==
Teams are reseeded after the first round

First Round; March 5
1	Denver	11
8	Minnesota-Duluth	4
2	Michigan Tech	5
7	Colorado College	2
3	North Dakota	5
6	Michigan State	2
4	Michigan	3
5	Minnesota	5

Second Round; March 8–9
1	Denver	9	7
5	Minnesota	0	3
2	Michigan Tech	0	2
3	North Dakota	0	3

Note: * denotes overtime period(s)

=== First round ===
==== (1) Denver vs. (8) Minnesota-Duluth ====
March 5	Denver	11 – 4	Minnesota-Duluth	DU Arena

==== (2) Michigan Tech vs. (7) Colorado College ====
March 5	Michigan Tech	5 – 2	Colorado College	Dee Stadium

==== (3) North Dakota vs. (6) Michigan State ====
March 5	North Dakota	5 – 2	Michigan State	Winter Sports Building

==== (4) Michigan vs. (5) Minnesota ====
March 5	Michigan	3 – 5	Minnesota	Weinberg Coliseum

=== Second round ===
==== (1) Denver vs. (5) Minnesota ====
March 8	Denver	9 – 0	Minnesota	DU Arena

March 9	Denver	7 – 3	Minnesota	DU Arena

Denver won series 16–3

==== (2) Michigan Tech vs. (3) North Dakota ====
March 8	Michigan Tech	0 – 0	North Dakota	Dee Stadium

March 9	Michigan Tech	2 – 3	North Dakota	Dee Stadium

North Dakota won series 2–3

== Tournament awards ==
None

== See also ==
- Western Collegiate Hockey Association men's champions
