= Tom Miller (ice hockey) =

Canadian ice hockey player

- Born: March 31, 1947 Kitchener, Ontario, Canada
- Died: September 25, 2017 (aged 70) St. Marys, Ontario, Canada
- Height: 6 ft 0 in (183 cm)
- Weight: 187 lb (85 kg; 13 st 5 lb)
- Position: Centre
- Shot: Left
- Played for: Detroit Red Wings; New York Islanders
- Playing career: 1969–1975

Thomas William Miller (March 31, 1947 – September 25, 2017) was a Canadian professional ice hockey forward who played 118 games in the National Hockey League for the New York Islanders and Detroit Red Wings between 1971 and 1974. He was also an NCAA Champion player at the University of Denver. He died of cancer in 2017.

== Career statistics ==
=== Regular season and playoffs ===
			Regular season					Playoffs
Season	Team	League	GP	G	A	Pts	PIM	GP	G	A	Pts	PIM
1962–63	Kitchener Greenshirts	OHA-B	—	—	—	—	—	—	—	—	—	—
1962–63	Guelph Royals	OHA	1	0	0	0	0	—	—	—	—	—
1963–64	Kitchener Rangers	OHA	56	9	18	27	21	—	—	—	—	—
1964–65	Kitchener Rangers	OHA	55	14	13	27	23	—	—	—	—	—
1965–66	University of Denver	WCHA	—	—	—	—	—	—	—	—	—	—
1966–67	University of Denver	WCHA	30	24	17	41	16	—	—	—	—	—
1967–68	University of Denver	WCHA	34	20	27	47	16	—	—	—	—	—
1968–69	University of Denver	WCHA	30	13	33	46	14	—	—	—	—	—
1969–70	Omaha Knights	CHL	63	19	20	39	23	12	3	5	8	4
1970–71	Detroit Red Wings	NHL	29	1	7	8	9	—	—	—	—	—
1970–71	Omaha Knights	CHL	47	19	33	52	7	—	—	—	—	—
1971–72	Cincinnati Swords	AHL	62	18	27	45	41	3	0	0	0	0
1972–73	New York Islanders	NHL	69	13	17	30	21	—	—	—	—	—
1973–74	New York Islanders	NHL	19	2	1	3	4	—	—	—	—	—
1973–74	Fort Worth Wings	CHL	11	3	7	10	0	—	—	—	—	—
1974–75	New Haven Nighthawks	AHL	73	13	30	43	28	16	1	7	8	19
1974–75	New York Islanders	NHL	1	0	0	0	0	—	—	—	—	—
NHL totals			118	16	25	41	34	—	—	—	—	—

== Awards and honors ==
Award	Year
All-WCHA Second Team	1968–69
All-NCAA All-Tournament First Team	1969
