= Mike Curran =

American ice hockey goaltender

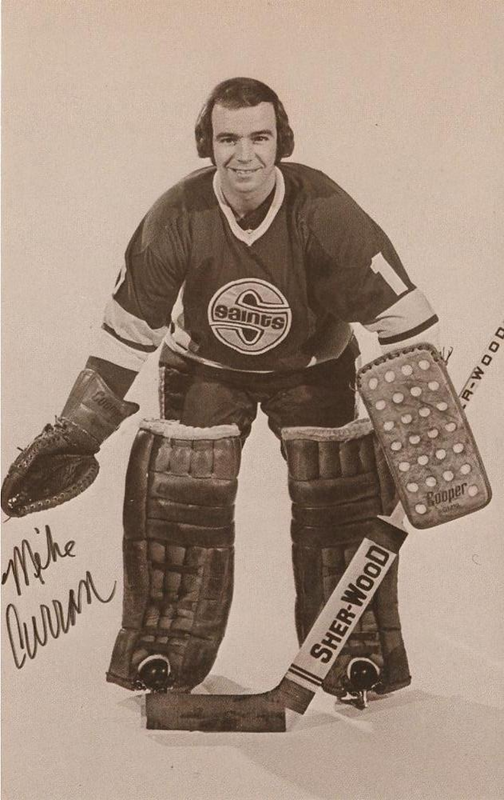

Personal information
- Full name: Michael Vincent Curran
- Born: April 14, 1944 (age 82) International Falls, Minnesota, U.S.
- Education: University of North Dakota
Medal record
Men's ice hockey
Representing United States
Olympic Games
Silver medal – second place	1972 Sapporo	Team

Michael Vincent Curran (born April 14, 1944) is a retired American ice hockey goaltender. He led the United States to a surprising silver medal at the 1972 Winter Olympics after representing the USA at the 1970 and 1971 Ice Hockey World Championship. He turned professional with the Minnesota Fighting Saints of the upstart World Hockey Association in 1972–73 and quickly became one of the early star goaltenders of the new league, playing in the 1973 WHA All-Star Game. Curran lost his job in 1976 when the Fighting Saints folded, but he returned to international hockey with Team USA at the 1976 and 1977 Ice Hockey World Championship as well as the 1976 Canada Cup. He retired following the 1977 season after a second stint with the revived Fighting Saints WHA franchise. Currently, Curran works as the headmaster at a prestigious private school. He was inducted into the North Dakota Athletics Hall of Fame in 1988.

Curran was inducted into the International Ice Hockey Federation Hall of Fame in 1999, and into the United States Hockey Hall of Fame in 1998. He was born in International Falls, Minnesota.

== Awards and honors ==
Award	Year
All-WCHA First Team	1967–68

== Career statistics ==
=== Regular season and playoffs ===
			Regular season									Playoffs
Season	Team	League	GP	W	L	T	MIN	GA	SO	GAA	SV%	GP	W	L	T	MIN	GA	SO	GAA	SV%
1962–63	Green Bay Bobcats	USHL	3	--	--	--	--	--	--	--	--	–	–	–	–	–	–	–	–	–
1965–66	University of North Dakota	WCHA	Statistics Unavailable
1967–68	University of North Dakota	WCHA	Statistics Unavailable
1968–69	Green Bay Bobcats	USHL	Statistics Unavailable
1969–70	Green Bay Bobcats	USHL	Statistics Unavailable
1970–71	U.S. National Team	Intl	29	--	--	--	--	--	--	--	--	--	--	--	--	--	--	--	--	--
1971–72	U.S. Olympic Team	Intl	11	--	--	--	--	--	--	--	--	--	--	--	--	--	--	--	--	--
1971–72	Green Bay Bobcats	USHL	Statistics Unavailable
1972–73	Minnesota Fighting Saints	WHA	43	23	17	2	2540	131	4	3.09	.909	2	--	--	--	--	9	0	--	.852
1973–74	Minnesota Fighting Saints	WHA	40	23	14	2	2382	130	2	3.27	.910	5	--	--	--	--	14	0	--	.913
1974–75	Minnesota Fighting Saints	WHA	26	11	10	1	1367	90	0	3.95	.893	—	—	—	—	—	—	—	—	—
1975–76	Minnesota Fighting Saints	WHA	5	2	2	0	240	22	1	5.50	.856	—	—	—	—	—	—	—	—	—
1975–76	Johnstown Jets	9	7	2	0	547	33	0	3.62	--	—	—	—	—	—	—	—	—	—
1976–77	Rochester Americans	AHL	9	1	4	1	391	23	1	3.54	.892	—	—	—	—	—	—	—	—	—
1976–77	Minnesota Fighting Saints	WHA	16	4	7	3	848	50	0	3.54	.895	—	—	—	—	—	—	—	—	—
WHA totals			114	59	43	5	6529	373	7	3.43	.903	7	--	--	--	--	23	0	--	.896

=== International ===
Year	Team	Event	GP	W	L	T	MIN	GA	SO	GAA
1972	United States	OLY	6	4	2	0	--	18	0	--
