= Building Markets =

Non-profit organization formed in 2004

- Founded: 2004
- Type: Nonprofit
- Purpose: Economic Development, Research, Entrepreneurship, Supply Chains
- Headquarters: New York City
- Location: New York City, Ottawa, Afghanistan, Timor-Leste, Haiti, Liberia
- Region served: Global
- Method: Donations and Grants
- Website: www.buildingmarkets.org

Formed in 2004, Building Markets, formerly Peace Dividend Trust (PDT), is a non-profit organization that builds markets, creates jobs and sustains peace in developing countries by championing local entrepreneurs and connecting them to new business opportunities.

== Area served ==
Building Markets has carried out project work in over a dozen countries including Kosovo, Sierra Leone, Afghanistan, Haiti, Liberia, Timor-Leste, Democratic Republic of Congo, Solomon Islands, Ivory Coast, and Myanmar.
