= Clarkson Golden Knights men's ice hockey statistical leaders =

The Clarkson Golden Knights men's ice hockey statistical leaders are individual statistical leaders of the Clarkson Golden Knights men's ice hockey program in various categories, including goals, assists, points, and saves. Within those areas, the lists identify single-game, single-season, and career leaders. The Golden Knights represent Clarkson University in the NCAA's ECAC Hockey.

Clarkson began competing in intercollegiate ice hockey in 1920. These lists are updated through the end of the 2020–21 season.

== Goals ==
Career
Rk	Player	Goals	Seasons
1	Kevin Zappia	103	1975–76 1976–77 1977–78 1978–79
2	Dave Taylor	98	1973–74 1974–75 1975–76 1976–77
3	Todd White	90	1993–94 1994–95 1995–96 1996–97
4	Jerry Kemp	88	1969–70 1970–71 1971–72
5	Eddie Rowe	87	1954–55 1955–56 1956–57
	Steve Cruickshank	87	1978–79 1979–80 1980–81 1981–82
7	Marko Tuomainen	82	1991–92 1992–93 1993–94 1994–95
8	Hugo Bélanger	81	1989–90 1990–91 1991–92 1992–93
9	Sid Tanchak	77	1975–76 1976–77 1977–78 1978–79
10	Corby Adams	76	1961–62 1962–63 1963–64
	John McLennan	76	1965–66 1966–67 1967–68

Season
Rk	Player	Goals	Season
1	Dave Taylor	41	1976–77
2	Bill Munro	39	1950–51
3	Todd White	38	1996–97
4	Grant Childerhose	36	1955–56
	Sid Tanchak	36	1976–77
6	Jerry Kemp	35	1969–70
7	Hugo Bélanger	32	1990–91
	John McLennan	32	1967–68
9	Dave Trombley	31	1990–91
	Eddie Rowe	31	1956–57
	Kevin Zappia	31	1977–78

Single Game
Rk	Player	Goals	Season	Opponent
1	Gene LaBonne	13	1941–42	Norwich

== Assists ==
Career
Rk	Player	Assists	Seasons
1	Dave Taylor	153	1973–74 1974–75 1975–76 1976–77
2	Hugo Bélanger	124	1989–90 1990–91 1991–92 1992–93
3	Bill Blackwood	117	1974–75 1975–76 1976–77 1977–78
	Brian Mueller	117	1991–92 1992–93 1993–94 1994–95
5	Kevin Zappia	110	1975–76 1976–77 1977–78 1978–79
6	Marko Tuomainen	109	1991–92 1992–93 1993–94 1994–95
7	Todd White	108	1993–94 1994–95 1995–96 1996–97
8	Luciano Borsato	107	1984–85 1985–86 1986–87 1987–88
9	Marty McNally	105	1974–75 1975–76 1976–77 1977–78
10	Craig Conroy	104	1990–91 1991–92 1992–93 1993–94
	Dave Trombley	104	1987–88 1988–89 1989–90 1990–91

Season
Rk	Player	Assists	Season
1	Dave Taylor	67	1976–77
2	Bill Blackwood	54	1976–77
3	Bryan Cleaver	44	1980–81
4	Hugo Bélanger	43	1990–91
	Todd White	43	1995–96
6	Brian Mueller	42	1994–95
7	Luciano Borsato	41	1986–87
8	Craig Conroy	40	1993–94
9	Rick Magnusson	39	1969–70
	Brian Mueller	39	1993–94

Single Game
Rk	Player	Assists	Season	Opponent
1	Malcom White	8	1950–51	Middlebury

== Points ==
Career
Rk	Player	Points	Seasons
1	Dave Taylor	251	1973–74 1974–75 1975–76 1976–77
2	Kevin Zappia	213	1975–76 1976–77 1977–78 1978–79
3	Hugo Bélanger	205	1989–90 1990–91 1991–92 1992–93
4	Todd White	198	1993–94 1994–95 1995–96 1996–97
5	Marko Tuomainen	191	1991–92 1992–93 1993–94 1994–95
6	Steve Cruickshank	190	1978–79 1979–80 1980–81 1981–82
7	Eddie Rowe	182	1954–55 1955–56 1956–57
8	Patrice Robitaille	175	1991–92 1992–93 1993–94 1994–95
9	Marty McNally	171	1974–75 1975–76 1976–77 1977–78
10	Sid Tanchak	170	1975–76 1976–77 1977–78 1978–79
	Luciano Borsato	170	1984–85 1985–86 1986–87 1987–88

Season
Rk	Player	Points	Season
1	Dave Taylor	108	1976–77
2	Hugo Bélanger	75	1990–91
3	Todd White	74	1996–97
4	Todd White	72	1995–96
5	Bill Blackwood	71	1976–77
6	Sid Tanchak	69	1976–77
	Dave Trombley	69	1990–91
8	Bryan Cleaver	68	1980–81
9	Craig Conroy	66	1993–94
10	Eddie Rowe	65	1955–56

Single Game
Rk	Player	Points	Season	Opponent
1	Gene LaBonne	13	1941–42	Norwich

== Saves ==
Career
Rk	Player	Saves	Seasons
1	Paul Karpowich	3,735	2008–09 2009–10 2010–11 2011–12
2	Dan Murphy	3,375	1994–95 1995–96 1996–97 1997–98
3	John Fletcher	3,097	1986–87 1987–88 1988–89 1989–90
4	Jake Kielly	2,817	2016–17 2017–18 2018–19
5	David Leggio	2,706	2004–05 2005–06 2006–07 2007–08
6	Jamie Falle	2,610	1982–83 1983–84 1984–85 1985–86
7	Bruce Bullock	2,228	1968–69 1969–70 1970–71
8	Jason Currie	2,151	1990–91 1991–92 1992–93 1993–94
9	Greg Lewis	2,141	2012–13 2013–14 2014–15 2015–16
10	Dustin Traylen	2,095	2002–03 2003–04 2004–05

Season
Rk	Player	Saves	Season
1	Paul Karpowich	1,092	2011–12
2	Paul Karpowich	1,053	2010–11
3	David Leggio	1,037	2006–07
4	Dan Murphy	1,034	1995–96
5	Dustin Traylen	1,023	2003–04
6	John Fletcher	971	1989–90
7	Jake Kielly	966	2018–19
8	John Fletcher	963	1987–88
9	Brian Shields	958	1976–77
10	Dan Murphy	942	1994–95

Single Game
Rk	Player	Saves	Season	Opponent
1	John Fletcher	57	1987–88	Colgate
