= Art Smith (ice hockey, fl. 1952–1956) =

American ice hockey player

- Born: Walpole, Massachusetts, U.S.
- Height: 6 ft 2 in (188 cm)
- Weight: 185 lb (84 kg; 13 st 3 lb)
- Position: Defenseman
- Shot: Right
- Played for: Clarkson
- Playing career: 1952–1956

Art Smith is an American retired ice hockey defenseman who was an All-American for Clarkson during its undefeated season in 1955–56.

== Career ==
Smith began attending Clarkson College of Technology (now Clarkson University) in the fall of 1952 and, because the team did not yet support a freshman team, he joined the varsity squad straight away. In his first two seasons, the team finished with decent records, but as a junior Smith saw the Golden Knights set a program record with 18 wins in 22 games. Unfortunately, St. Lawrence had won the Tri-State League that season, so Clarkson did not receive a bid to the 1955 NCAA Tournament.

In his senior season Smith helped Clarkson produce what is recognized as the first undefeated season in NCAA history. Clarkson finished the year with a 23–0 record and was named as an AHCA Second Team All-American. With their unblemished record, the team was offered a bid to the NCAA Tournament but there was a rather sizable condition; because the NCAA limited athletes to just three years of varsity play, the eight four-year players on the team (including Smith) would not be able to participate in the tournament. Head coach Bill Harrison allowed the players decide that if some couldn't play, none of them would play.

Smith graduated in 1956 and joined the United States men's national ice hockey team for the upcoming World Championships. Due to the Hungarian Revolution of 1956 that was violently suppressed by the Soviet Union, both the United States and Canada boycotted the tournament.

He was inducted into the Clarkson Athletic Hall of Fame in 2010.

== Statistics ==
=== Regular season and playoffs ===
			Regular season					Playoffs
Season	Team	League	GP	G	A	Pts	PIM	GP	G	A	Pts	PIM
1952–53	Clarkson	Tri-State League	19	1	2	3	—	—	—	—	—	—
1953–54	Clarkson	Tri-State League	17	4	5	9	—	—	—	—	—	—
1954–55	Clarkson	Tri-State League	21	3	16	19	—	—	—	—	—	—
1955–56	Clarkson	Tri-State League	23	2	8	10	—	—	—	—	—	—
NCAA totals			80	10	31	41	—	—	—	—	—	—

== Awards and honors ==
Award	Year
AHCA Second Team All-American	1955–56
