= Eddie MacDonald (ice hockey) =

Canadian ice hockey player

- Born: 1935 (age 90–91) Ottawa, Ontario, Canada
- Height: 5 ft 10 in (178 cm)
- Weight: 165 lb (75 kg; 11 st 11 lb)
- Position: Goaltender
- Shot: Left
- Played for: Clarkson
- Playing career: 1955–1960

Edward 'Eddie' MacDonald is a Canadian retired ice hockey goaltender who was a two-time All-American for Clarkson, and was in net for every game of their undefeated season in 1955–56.

== Career ==
MacDonald was one of several Canadian players to travel south to play at Clarkson College of Technology for Bill Harrison. After a year with the freshman team, MacDonald joined the varsity squad just in time for the best season in program history. While the offense dominated the competition, scoring nearly seven and a half goals per game, MacDonald backstopped the team to an undefeated record, allowing just 58 goals in the 23 games. The unblemished mark, the first for qualifying NCAA competition, earned Clarkson a bid to the 1956 NCAA Tournament. Unfortunately, because eight players on the team were 4-year varsity players (one more than the NCAA allowed at the time) they would be ineligible to participate. The team unanimously decided that it would decline the invitation and Clarkson's championship hoped would have to wait for another day.

Clarkson's streak ended the following season, losing in the third game of the campaign, but MacDonald refused to allow the team to lose again until the final game of the regular season. The team finished with an 18–2 mark and was again offered a bid to the NCAA tournament and, with all players now eligible, the Golden Knights made their national tournament debut. In the semifinal Clarkson faced off against Colorado College and MacDonald had his hands full against the nation's top offense. The Tigers fired 60 shots at the Clarkson net, about double what is normally seen in a competitive game, compared to the paltry 21 that Clarkson was able to produce. MacDonald was outstanding in the game, turning aside 55 of the shots to give Clarkson a chance, but the Golden Knights came up short, losing 3–5. MacDonald had a slightly easier time in the consolation game against Harvard, facing only 45 shots in an overtime affair, but this time the Golden Knights were able to compliment MacDonald's performance and finish the tournament in third place on Ed Rowe's overtime marker. The 99 saves MacDonald made in the two games earned him First Team All-Tournament honors despite not making the championship game.

MacDonald was named team captain for his senior season and again produced a stellar season. With the offense lagging, MacDonald was relied on much more heavily than the previous two years and he responded brilliantly, leading the team to a 16–2 record and was named as an AHCA East All-American Clarkson made their second consecutive tournament but in the semifinal their lack of offense caught up to them and they were easily dispatched by Denver. The team finished in third place after another win over Harvard with MacDonald making another All-Tournament team. MacDonald finished his college career with a 48–6 record for a .889 winning percentage, one of the best marks in history and a record for NCAA play. The record would stand for over a decade before being surpassed by Ken Dryden in 1969.

After graduating with a degree in civil engineering, MacDonald continued his playing career and appeared in goal for the Wembley Lions in 1960. He played for the team during the final year of the British National League and when it was over MacDonald's playing career came to a close. He was inducted into the Clarkson Athletic Hall of Fame in 2005.

== Awards and honors ==
Award	Year
AHCA Second Team All-American	1956–57
NCAA All-Tournament First Team	1957
AHCA East All-American	1957–58
NCAA All-Tournament Second Team	1958

Sporting positions
Preceded by Willard Ikola/Jim Mattson	NCAA Single-Season Wins Leader; 1956–1958	Succeeded by Rodney Schneck
