= 1991 ECAC Hockey men's ice hockey tournament =

1991 ECAC Men's ice hockey tournament
- Dates: February 26–March 10, 1991
- Teams: 10
- Finals site: Boston Garden; Boston, Massachusetts
- Champions: Clarkson (2nd title)
- Winning coach: Mark Morris (1st title)
- MVP: Hugo Belanger (Clarkson)
- ECAC Men's Ice Hockey Tournaments

The 1991 ECAC Hockey Men's Ice Hockey Tournament was the 30th tournament in league history. It was played between February 26 and March 10, 1991. Preliminary and quarterfinal games were played at home team campus sites, while the 'final four' games were played at the Boston Garden in Boston, Massachusetts. By winning the tournament, Clarkson received the ECAC's automatic bid to the 1991 NCAA Division I Men's Ice Hockey Tournament.

== Format ==
The tournament featured four rounds of play. The two teams that finish below tenth place in the standings are not eligible for tournament play. In the first round, the seventh and tenth seeds and the eighth and ninth seeds each play a single game to determine the final qualifying teams for the quarterfinals. In the quarterfinals the first seed and lower ranked qualifier, the second and higher ranked qualifier, the third seed and sixth seed and the fourth seed and fifth seed played a two-game series to determine the winner. In the two games no overtime was permitted and if the two teams remained tied after the two games then a 10-minute minigame would be played where a sudden-death overtime was allowed if the scheduled time did not produce a victor. After the opening round every series becomes a single-elimination game. In the semifinals, the highest seed plays the lowest remaining seed while the two remaining teams play with the winners advancing to the championship game and the losers advancing to the third place game. The tournament champion receives an automatic bid to the 1991 NCAA Division I Men's Ice Hockey Tournament.

== Conference standings ==
Note: GP = Games played; W = Wins; L = Losses; T = Ties; PTS = Points; GF = Goals For; GA = Goals Against

1990–91 ECAC Hockey standings
	Conference							Overall					
	GP	W	L	T	PTS	GF	GA	GP	W	L	T	GF	GA
Clarkson†*	22	15	5	2	32	113	77	40	29	9	2	213	143
Cornell	22	14	5	3	31	93	69	32	18	11	3	143	111
St. Lawrence	22	15	6	1	31	101	79	35	21	13	1	146	121
Harvard	22	13	7	2	28	130	74	29	14	12	3	145	102
Rensselaer	22	14	8	0	28	118	93	32	19	12	1	171	140
Vermont	22	12	8	2	26	89	83	33	17	14	2	129	130
Colgate	22	9	9	4	22	93	81	32	16	12	4	138	125
Brown	22	9	11	2	20	78	99	27	9	15	3	94	127
Yale	22	9	11	2	20	80	89	29	11	16	2	98	123
Princeton	22	7	14	1	15	84	104	27	8	18	1	97	129
Army	22	3	17	2	8	56	106	29	8	18	3	104	121
Dartmouth	22	0	19	3	3	52	131	28	1	24	3	68	170
Championship: Clarkson † indicates conference regular season champion * indicates conference tournament champion (Whitelaw Cup)

== Bracket ==
Teams are reseeded after the first two rounds

First Round; February 26
7	Colgate	5
10	Princeton	2
8	Brown	1
9	Yale	2

Quarterfinals; March 1–2
1	Clarkson	4	6	—
9	Yale	0	3	—
2	Cornell	10	8	—
7	Colgate	3	1	—
3	St. Lawrence	8	1	1
6	Vermont	2	3	0
4	Harvard	7	3	—
5	Rensselaer	3	3	—

Semifinals; March 9
1	Clarkson	3
4	Harvard	2
2	Cornell	3
3	St. Lawrence	4*

Championship; March 10
1	Clarkson	5
3	St. Lawrence	4

Note: * denotes overtime period(s)

=== Preliminary round ===
==== (7) Colgate vs. (10) Princeton ====
February 26	Colgate	5 – 2	Princeton	Starr Rink

==== (8) Brown vs. (9) Yale ====
February 26	Brown	1 – 2	Yale	Meehan Auditorium

=== Quarterfinals ===
==== (1) Clarkson vs. (9) Yale ====
March 1	Clarkson	4 – 0	Yale	Walker Arena

March 2	Clarkson	6 – 3	Yale	Walker Arena

Clarkson won series 2–0

==== (2) Cornell vs. (7) Colgate ====
March 1	Cornell	10 – 3	Colgate	Lynah Rink

March 2	Cornell	8 – 1	Colgate	Lynah Rink

Cornell won series 2–0

==== (3) St. Lawrence vs. (6) Vermont ====
March 1	St. Lawrence	8 – 2	Vermont	Appleton Arena

March 2	St. Lawrence	1 – 3	Vermont	Appleton Arena

March 2	St. Lawrence	1 – 0 (mini)	Vermont	Appleton Arena

St. Lawrence won series 2–1

==== (4) Harvard vs. (5) Rensselaer ====
March 1	Harvard	7 – 3	Rensselaer	Bright Hockey Center

March 2	Harvard	3 – 3	Rensselaer	Bright Hockey Center

Harvard won series 1–0–1

=== Semifinals ===
==== (1) Clarkson vs. (4) Harvard ====
March 9	Clarkson	3 - 1	Harvard	Boston Garden

==== (2) Cornell vs. (3) St. Lawrence ====
March 9	Cornell	3 – 4	OT	St. Lawrence	Boston Garden

=== Championship ===
==== (1) Clarkson vs. (3) St. Lawrence ====
March 10	Clarkson	5 – 4	St. Lawrence	Boston Garden

== Tournament awards ==
=== All-Tournament Team ===
- F Scott Thomas (Clarkson)
- F Andy Pritchard (St. Lawrence)
- F Hugo Belanger* (Clarkson)
- D Dave Tretowicz (Clarkson)
- D Daniel Laperrière (St. Lawrence)
- G Chris Rogles (Clarkson)

* Most Outstanding Player(s)
