= Clarkson Golden Knights men's ice hockey =

College ice hockey program

- Current season
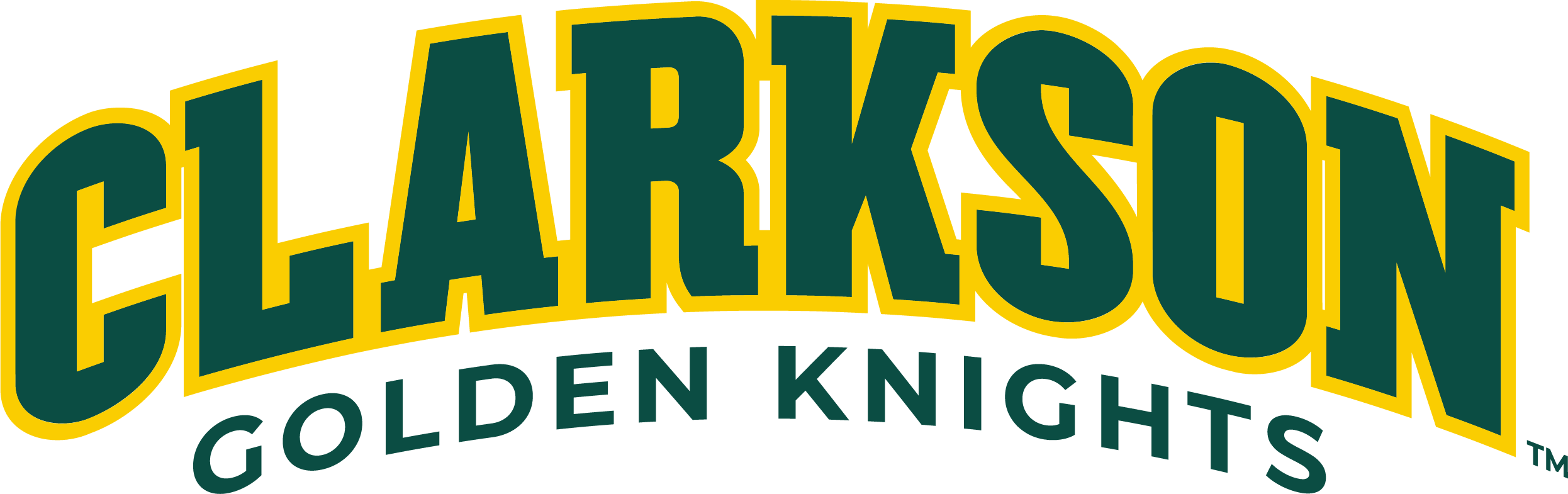
- University: Clarkson University
- Conference: ECAC
- First season: 1920–21
- Head coach: Jean-François Houle; 2nd season, 24–12–3 (.654)
- Assistant coaches: Chris Brooks; Corey Leivermann; Sebastian Ragno
- Arena: Cheel Arena; Potsdam, New York
- Colors: Green and gold

NCAA tournament runner-up
- 1962, 1966, 1970

NCAA tournament Frozen Four
- 1957, 1958, 1962, 1963, 1966, 1970, 1991

NCAA tournament appearances
- 1957, 1958, 1962, 1963, 1966, 1970, 1981, 1982, 1984, 1990, 1991, 1992, 1993, 1995, 1996, 1997, 1998, 1999, 2007, 2008, 2018, 2019

Conference tournament champions
- ECAC: 1966, 1991, 1993, 1999, 2007, 2019

Conference regular season champions
- TSL: 1951, 1956, 1958, 1962, 1964, 1965, 1966, 1968, 1970, 1971; ECAC: 1966, 1977, 1981, 1982, 1991, 1995, 1997, 1999, 2001, 2008 (Note: Clarkson was in multiple conferences from 1961 to 1972.)

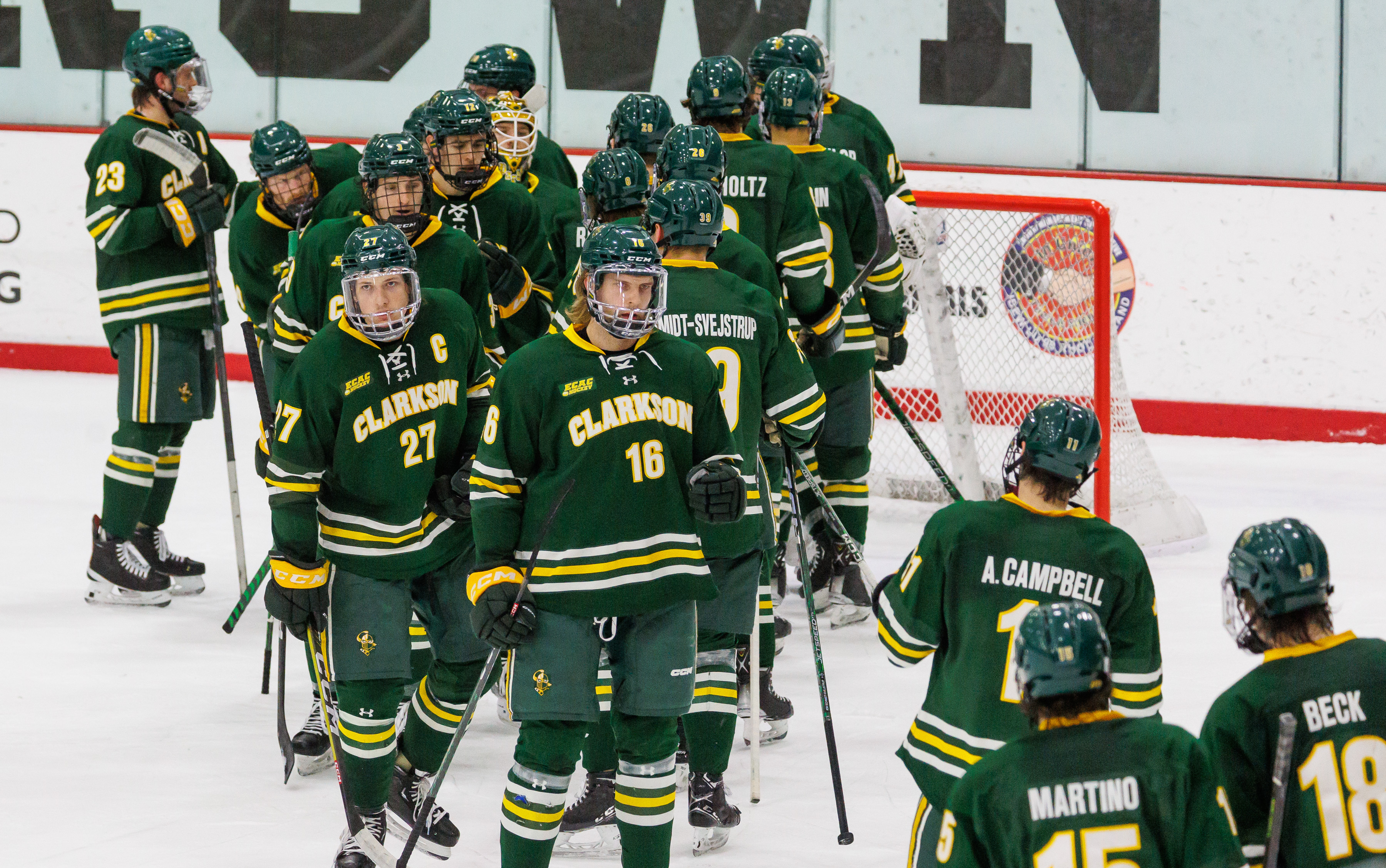
Clarkson Golden Knights in 2023

The Clarkson Golden Knights men's ice hockey team is a National Collegiate Athletic Association (NCAA) Division I college ice hockey program that represents Clarkson University. The Golden Knights have been a member of ECAC Hockey since 1962, and play their home games at Cheel Arena in Potsdam, New York. While Clarkson lore has it that their first hockey game was played in 1916 against the Hogansburg Indians, the team was established as a hockey club in 1921, led by captain Bill Johnson. The Knights won their opening encounter against Alexandria Bay, 6–4, and finished the year with a 2–1 record, their first of many winning seasons.

== History ==
=== Early years ===
Clarkson College of Technology started its hockey team in 1921, only 25 years after the school's founding. The program played as a minor sport until the mid 1930s but routinely finished with winning records. In 1937–38 The Golden Knights completed a 13–1–1 record and were named the US Intercollegiate champions. A year later the University opened its first indoor rink, the Clarkson Arena, which would serve the college until 1991. The program took a slight downturn in the 1940s and then suspended operations for two years due to the outbreak of World War II but returned to the ice the year after the war ended. When The first college hockey tournament began in 1947 Clarkson was in the running for selection but was beaten out for the two eastern slots. Three years and one coaching change later, Clarkson College became a founding member of the first college ice hockey conference, the Tri-State League. The Golden Knights not only won the conference with a 4–1 record, but because they tied with Middlebury, they also participated in the first conference playoff game to determine the sole champion and were victorious. Unfortunately the team's 12–2–1 mark was still not good enough to receive an invitation to the NCAA tournament. The program continued to build until they produced a superb 23–0 record in 1956 with NCAA scoring champion Ed Rowe leading the way. 'Tech' finally received an NCAA invitation but it came with a caveat; because eight of their players were 4-year lettermen they would have to sit out the tournament for Clarkson to participate. Because of this the team voted to pass on the invitation. The Golden Knights wouldn't have to wait long for their first tournament appearance, however, as they were invited the following year and finished in third place. After a second consecutive third-place head coach Bill Harrison resigned and turned the team over to Len Ceglarski. The first few years under Ceglarski saw the team's record dip slightly but stating in his third season the Golden Knights became a constant power in college hockey.

=== ECAC powerhouse ===
Clarkson was one of 28 founding members of the ECAC in 1961 and finished in second place both in the conference and the ECAC tournament. Clarkson was invited to the NCAA tournament, boasting the top offense in the nation and used its firepower to down Michigan in the semifinal but couldn't repeat the performance in the title match and fell to Michigan Tech 1–7. Clarkson made the tournament the following year but finished with its third #3 finish. In 1966 Clarkson posted a superb season, winning the ICAC and ECAC crowns before taking its first ECAC Tournament. In the tournament Clarkson faced relatively weak opponents (the 4th- and 6th-place teams from the WCHA) and though they managed to win their semifinal matchup, they couldn't take advantage in the title tilt and fell to Michigan State 1–6. Tech continued to play well over the next few years but would not return to the NCAA tournament until 1970. After defeating the top western team in the semifinal, Clarkson faced off against the undefeated Cornell Big Red and fought tooth and nail for their first championship. The game was tied after both the first and second period with the Golden Knights having taken the lead twice on the strength of Bruce Bullock's goaltending but a natural hat trick by Cornell's Dan Lodboa in the third frame put the game out of reach and Clarkson had to settle for runner-up for the third time. The following year Clarkson finished in second place for both the ECAC and their conference tournament but received a slap in the face from the selection committee when they were passed over for Boston University as the second eastern team. To add insult to injury, the Terriers went on to claim the championship that year. A year later Len Ceglarski would leave the program to take over at his alma mater Boston College, having led Clarkson to 12 consecutive seasons of at least a .600 winning percentage.

=== Intermittent success ===
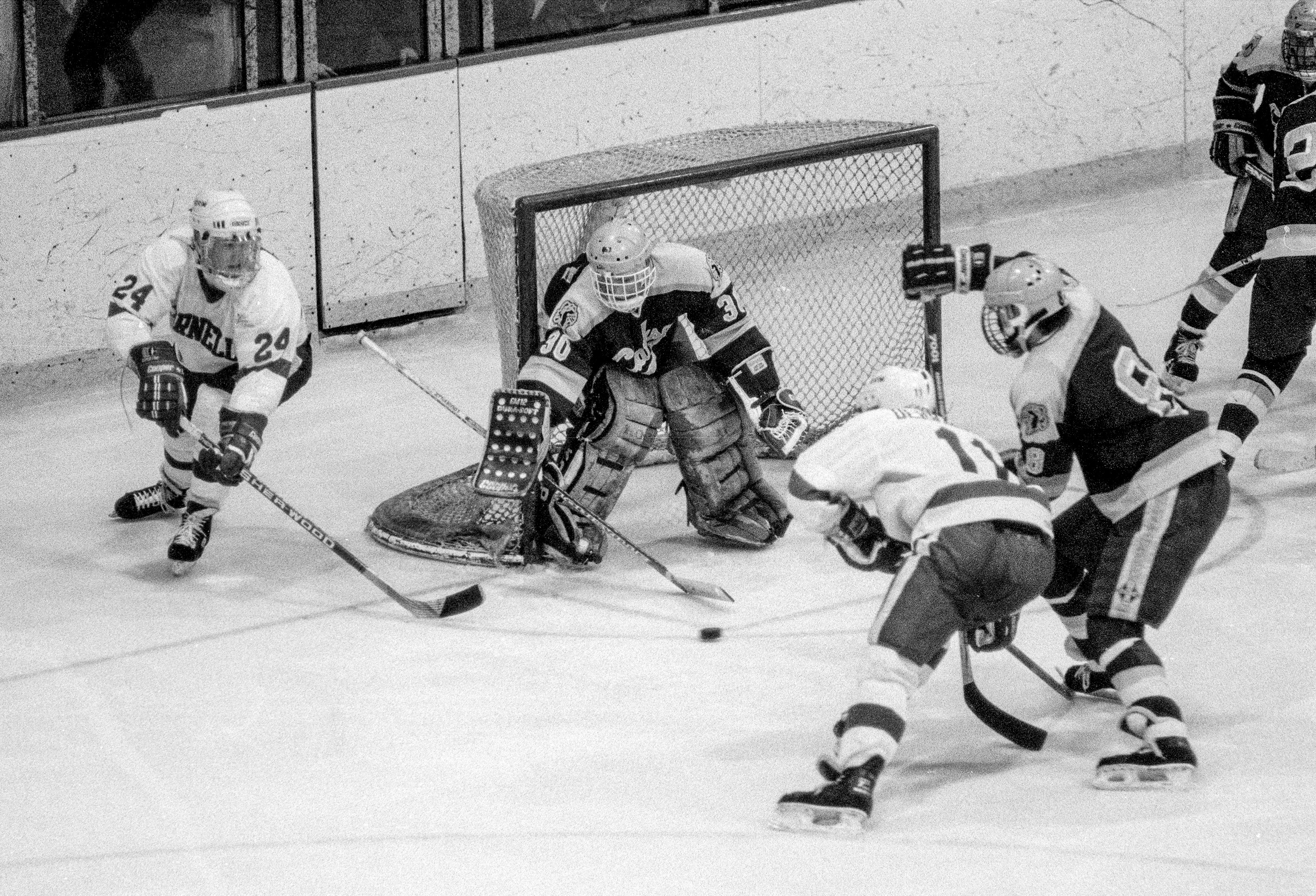
Clarkson plays Cornell in 1987

Jerry York, another BC grad, would take over in 1973 and, as it had under Ceglarski, the program's record slumped. It took four years for Tech to climb back to its lofty perch and in 1977 it did just that with future NHL all-star Dave Taylor leading the way. Clarkson finished with the best record in the ECAC and went into the postseason as one of the favorites for the national championship. Unfortunately the team hit a roadblock in the semifinal, losing to Boston University 6–7 and finished the ECAC tournament in 4th place. Once Taylor left the program dipped but still performed well. However, in 1979 York left for greener pastures, turning the team over to Clarkson alumnus Bill O'Flaherty. In O'Flaherty's six seasons behind the bench the Golden Knights never finished with a record below .600 and captured two ECAC titles. Though Tech wouldn't win any of those ECAC tournaments, the expanded NCAA tournament allowed Clarkson to earn three at-large bids into the national tournament. The Golden Knights record in the NCAA tournament was disappointing, going 1–4–1 in three tries and losing in the first round each time. O'Flaherty would turn the team over to former NHL-er Cap Raeder in 1985 and the new coach would shepherd the team well over three seasons but it wasn't until Mark Morris took the reins in 1988 that the program would return to prominence once more.

=== 1990s resurgence ===
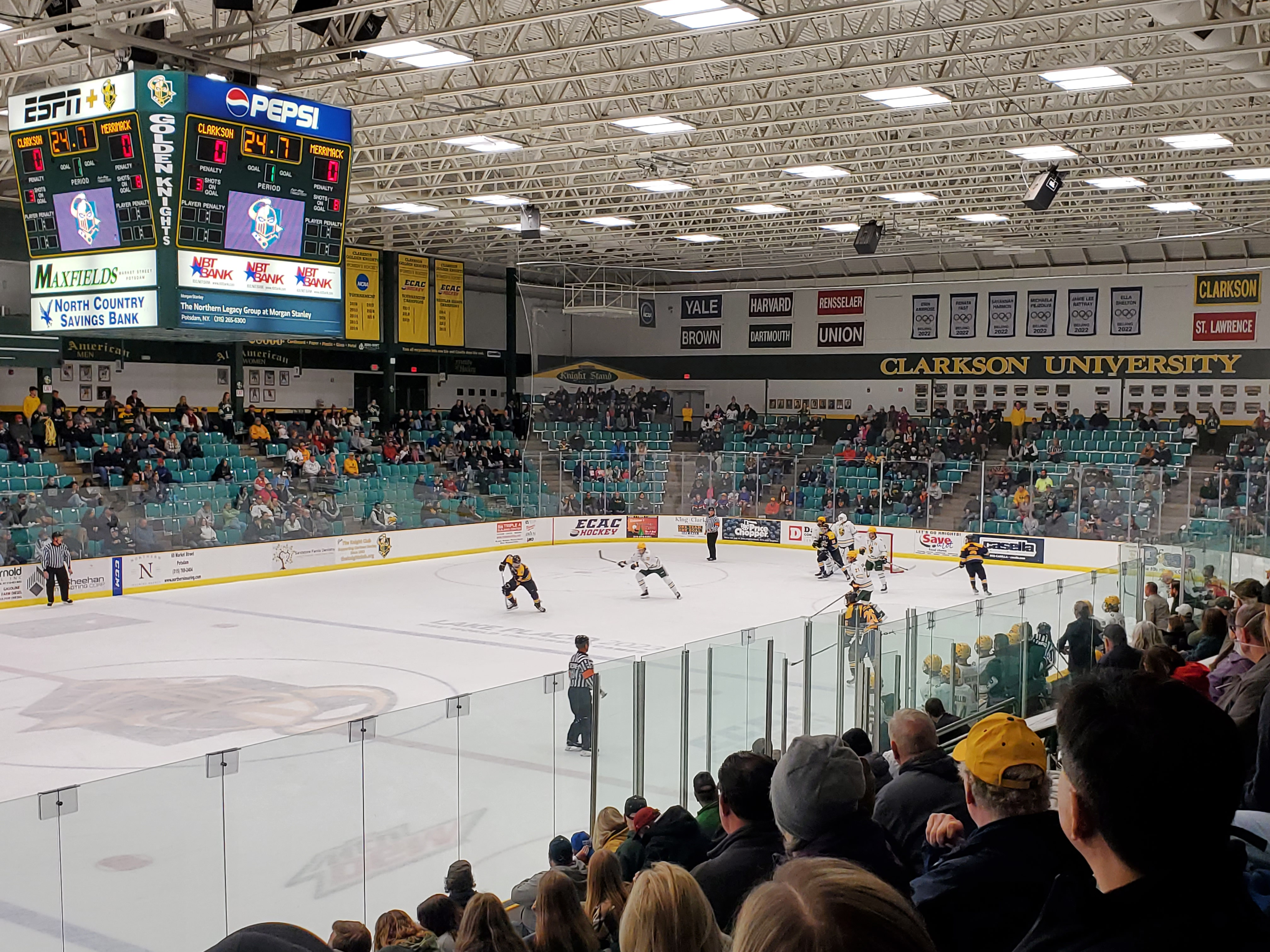
Clarkson's Cheel Arena opened in 1992

Though Clarkson hadn't had a losing season since 1975 when Morris took over, the team had an air of underachieving about it especially when it came to postseason results. Tech proceeded to produce steadily increasing results in Morris' first three seasons, culminating with a program-record 29-win season in 1991 that also saw the Golden Knights win their first ECAC tournament since 1966. Despite the top finish Clarkson received no respect from the selection committee and was seeded 4th in the eastern bracket despite having a better record than the 2nd- and 3rd-seeded schools. Clarkson pushed past the slight and defeated defending champion Wisconsin in the first round series. In the Quarterfinals Tech took on the top western seed, Lake Superior State, and triumphed in the series 2 games to 1. The Golden Knights reached the frozen four for the first time in 21 years but the magic wore off once they did and they fell to BU 3–7. Clarkson's performance in the 1991 tournament gave them enough credibility to earn an NCAA bid despite flaming out in the ECAC tournament the following year. Similar to what they had done under Ceglarski, Clarkson never had a sub-.600 record during the entire decade, winning four ECAC titles, three conference tournaments and making the NCAA tournament nine out of ten seasons. Despite the success the Golden Knights wilted once they entered the national tournament. Aside from their semifinal run in 1991 Clarkson won only one game in eight other appearances.

=== Firing and decline ===
Tech's record slipped with the dawn of a new millennium but Morris' teams still produced winning records. Clarkson was expected to continue this trend for years to come but in November 2002 Morris was suspended following an altercation with one of his players after a team practice. After a 10-day inquiry Morris was dismissed from the team and his assistant Fred Parker took over in the interim. The team played flat most of the rest of the season, posting the program's first losing record in almost 30 years and their worst winning percentage in over 40 seasons. Parker was replaced by George Roll the following year and after a slow start, the Golden Knights recovered and finished as runner-ups in the ECAC tournament. After two middling seasons Clarkson returned to its superior success with a 25-win season in 2007 where the team captured its fifth ECAC tournament title. After winning the regular season ECAC crown the next season Clarkson dropped in the standings, finishing the next three seasons with losing records and, in 2010, posting the program's worst season since before the second world war.

=== Slow climb back ===
Roll was fired in 2011 with the program at its nadir, becoming the only full-time head coach to finish his tenure at Clarkson with a losing record. His former assistant Casey Jones was eventually selected as the replacement and a slow climb out of the cellar began. It took three seasons before Tech had another winning season and wasn't until 2018 that Clarkson made an appearance in the NCAA tournament. The Golden Knights would lose in the first round that year but with four players making the ECAC all-rookie team over the previous two seasons Clarkson was well placed to improve their standing over the next few years.

Clarkson, which became the fastest Division I college hockey program to compile 1,000 victories and one of only a few to reach that mark, has compiled a 1436–862–160 record for an all-time winning percentage of .617, which is among the best in the country.

Clarkson has had 36 individuals earn All-American honors since 1928, including 13 who have won the honor twice. Defenseman Fred Dion and center Buzz Williams were the first Golden Knights to receive the honor in 1928–29.

The 2020–21 season was cancelled prior to the ECAC tournament due to the team violating COVID-19 protocols.

On June 13, 2024, it was announced that Casey Jones would leave the program to return to his alma mater, Cornell, as a Head Coach Elect.

On June 21, 2024, Clarkson University announced the hiring of Jean-François Houle as the next head coach of the program.

== Season-by-season results ==
Source:

== Coaching history ==
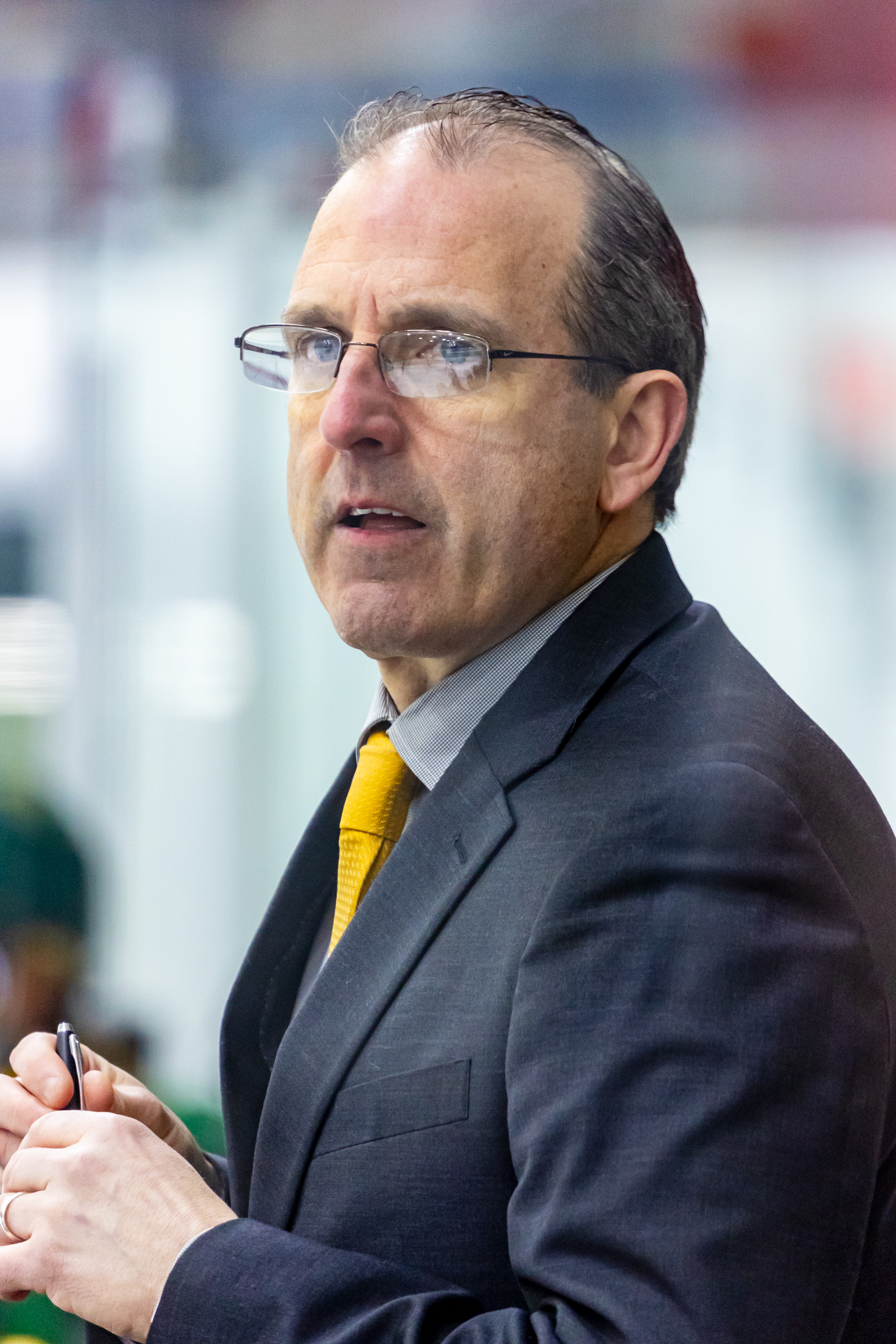
Casey Jones, coach 2011–2024

As of the completion of 2024–25 season

Tenure	Coach	Years	Record	Pct.
1920–29	Gordon Croskery	9	41–22–1	.648
1929–48	Jack Roos	17	136–79–7	.628
1948–58	William Harrison	10	127–47–6	.722
1958–72	Len Ceglarski	14	254–98–10	.715
1972–79	Jerry York	7	125–87–3	.588
1979–85	Bill O'Flaherty	6	134–59–12	.683
1985–88	Cap Raeder	3	52–39–7	.566
1988–2002†	Mark Morris	15†	306–156–42	.649
2002–03	Fred Parker	1†	12–17–3	.422
2003–11	George Roll	8	130–142–33	.480
2011–2024	Casey Jones	13	234–185–56	.552
2024–present	Jean-François Houle	1	24–12–3	.654
Totals	12 coaches	103 seasons	1575–943–183	.617

† Mark Morris was fired in November 2002.

== Awards and honors ==
=== United States Hockey Hall of Fame ===
- Len Ceglarski (1992)

=== NCAA ===
==== Individual awards ====
Spencer Penrose Award

- William Harrison: 1956
- Len Ceglarski: 1966
- Jerry York: 1977
- Bill O'Flaherty: 1981

NCAA Division I Ice Hockey Scoring Champion

- Ed Rowe: 1956
- Dave Taylor: 1977

==== All-Americans ====
AHCA First Team All-Americans

- 1955-56: Ed Rowe, F
- 1956-57: Ed Rowe, F
- 1957-58: Eddie MacDonald, G
- 1962-63: Pat Brophy, D; Cal Wagner, D
- 1963-64: Pat Brophy, D; Corby Adams, F
- 1964-65: Terry Yurkiewicz, G
- 1965-66: Terry Yurkiewicz, G
- 1969-70: Bruce Bullock, G
- 1970-71: Bruce Bullock, G; Steve Warr, D
- 1971-72: Steve Warr, D
- 1975-76: Brian Shields, G
- 1976-77: Brian Shields, G; Bill Blackwood, D; Dave Taylor, F
- 1977-78: Bill Blackwood, D
- 1980-81: Don Sylvestri, G; Ed Small, D; Bryan Cleaver, F
- 1981-82: Steve Cruickshank, F
- 1982-83: Colin Patterson, F
- 1983-84: Bob Armstrong, D; Dave Fretz, D
- 1984-85: Dave Fretz, D
- 1993-94: Brian Mueller, D; Craig Conroy, F
- 1994-95: Brian Mueller, D
- 1996-97: Matt Pagnutti, D; Todd White, F
- 2000-01: Kent Huskins, D
- 2018-19: Nico Sturm, F
- 2024–25: Ayrton Martino, F

AHCA Second Team All-Americans

- 1955-56: Art Smith, D
- 1956-57: Eddie MacDonald, G
- 1985-86: Andy Otto, D
- 1987-88: John Fletcher, G; Luciano Borsato, F
- 1994-95: Marko Tuomainen, F
- 1995-96: Dan Murphy, G; Todd White, F
- 1996-97: Dan Murphy, G
- 1998-99: Willie Mitchell, D; Erik Cole, F
- 2006-07: Nick Dodge, F
- 2007-08: Grant Clitsome, D
- 2017-18: Kelly Summers, D; Sheldon Rempal, F
- 2019–20: Frank Marotte, G
- 2024–25: Trey Taylor, D

=== ECAC hockey ===
==== Individual awards ====
ECAC Hockey Player of the Year

- Terry Yurkiewicz: 1966
- Bruce Bullock: 1971
- Dave Taylor: 1977
- Ed Small: 1981
- Steve Cruickshank: 1982
- Todd White: 1997
- Ayrton Martino: 2025

ECAC Hockey Rookie of the Year

- Don Sylvestri: 1981
- John Fletcher: 1987
- Erik Cole: 1998
- Willie Mitchell: 1998
- Rob McFeeters: 2001
- Ethan Haider: 2021

ECAC Hockey Best Defensive Forward

- Buddy Wallace: 1998
- Nick Dodge: 2008
- Nico Sturm: 2018, 2019
- Josh Dunne: 2020
- Zach Tsekos: 2021

ECAC Hockey Best Defensive Defenseman

- Martin d'Orsonnens: 1993
- Matt Pagnutti: 1997
- Kent Huskins: 2001
- James de Haas: 2017
- Trey Taylor: 2024, 2025

Ken Dryden Award

- David Leggio: 2007
- Frank Marotte: 2020
- Ethan Langenegger: 2025

ECAC Hockey Student-Athlete of the Year

- Matt Zarbo: 2013
- Zach Tsekos: 2020

Tim Taylor Award

- Mark Morris: 1991, 2001
- Jean-François Houle: 2025

ECAC Hockey Most Outstanding Player in Tournament

- Terry Yurkiewicz: 1966
- Bruce Bullock: 1970
- Hugo Belanger: 1991
- Chris Rogles: 1993
- Willie Mitchell: 1999
- Chris D'Alvise: 2007
- Devin Brosseau: 2019

==== All-ECAC ====
First Team All-ECAC Hockey

- 1961–62: Cal Wagner, D; Hal Pettersen, F; Corby Adams, F
- 1962–63: Cal Wagner, D; Pat Brophy, D; Corby Adams, F
- 1963–64: Corby Adams, F
- 1970–71: Bruce Bullock, G; Steve Warr, D
- 1971–72: Steve Warr, D
- 1975–76: Brian Shields, G
- 1976–77: Brian Shields, G; Dave Taylor, F
- 1979–80: Mike Prestidge, F
- 1980–81: Don Sylvestri, G; Ed Small, D; Bryan Cleaver, F
- 1981–82: Steve Cruickshank, F
- 1983–84: Bob Armstrong, F
- 1984–85: Dave Fretz, D
- 1987–88: John Fletcher, G
- 1988–89: Jarmo Kekäläinen, F
- 1990–91: Dave Tretowicz, D
- 1992–93: Marko Tuomainen, F
- 1993–94: Brian Mueller, D; Craig Conroy, F
- 1994–95: Brian Mueller, D; Marko Tuomainen, F
- 1996–97: Matt Pagnutti, D; Todd White, F
- 1998–99: Willie Mitchell, D; Erik Cole, F
- 1999–00: Kent Huskins, D
- 2000–01: Kent Huskins, D
- 2001–02: Kerry Ellis-Toddington, D
- 2002–03: Randy Jones, D
- 2006–07: David Leggio, G; Nick Dodge, F
- 2007–08: Grant Clitsome, D; Steve Zalewski, F
- 2017–18: Kelly Summers, D; Sheldon Rempal, F
- 2019–20: Frank Marotte, G
- 2020–21: Connor McCarthy, D; Zach Tsekos, F
- 2021–22: Alex Campbell, F; Mathieu Gosselin, F

Second Team All-ECAC Hockey

- 1961–62: Wayne Gibbons, G; Pat Brophy, D; Roger Purdie, F
- 1962–63: Roger Purdie, F; Brian Wilkinson, F
- 1963–64: Roger Purdie, F; Brian Wilkinson, F
- 1964–65: Terry Yurkiewicz, G
- 1965–66: Terry Yurkiewicz, G; Gary Petterson, D; Tom Hurley, F
- 1967–68: John McLennan, F
- 1969–70: Wayne LaChance, D
- 1970–71: Jerry Kemp, F
- 1975–76: Bill Blackwood, D
- 1976–77: Bill Blackwood, D
- 1977–78: Bill Blackwood, D; Marty McNally, F; Kevin Zappia, F
- 1979–80: Ed Small, D; Steve Cruickshank, F
- 1980–81: Steve Cruickshank, F
- 1982–83: Dave Fretz, D; Colin Patterson, F
- 1987–88: Luciano Borsato, F
- 1989–90: Dave Tretowicz, D
- 1990–91: Chris Rogles, G
- 1991–92: Hugo Belanger, F
- 1992–93: Todd Marchant, F
- 1993–94: Jason Currie, G
- 1994–95: Patrice Robitaille, F
- 1995–96: Todd White, F
- 1996–97: Dan Murphy, G
- 1997–98: Willie Mitchell, D; Chris Clark, F
- 1999–00: Erik Cole, F
- 2000–01: Mike Walsh, G; Matt Poapst, F
- 2007–08: David Leggio, G
- 2016–17: James De Haas, D
- 2017–18: Terrance Amorosa, D
- 2018–19: Jake Kielly, G; Aaron Thow, D; Haralds Egle, F
- 2019–20: Connor McCarthy, D
- 2021–22: Noah Beck, D; Zach Tsekos, F
- 2023–24: Trey Taylor, D

Third Team All-ECAC Hockey

- 2005–06: Nick Dodge, F
- 2007–08: Matt Beca, F
- 2011–12: Paul Karpowich, G
- 2015–16: James De Haas, D
- 2016–17: Sam Vineault, F
- 2017–18: Jake Kielly, G; Nico Sturm, F
- 2019–20: Devin Brosseau, F; Josh Dunne, F; Haralds Egle, F
- 2021–22: Lukas Kälble, D
- 2022–23: Noah Beck, D; Ayrton Martino, F; Mathieu Gosselin, F
- 2023–24: Dalton Bancroft, F; Mathieu Gosselin, F

ECAC Hockey All-Rookie Team

- 1987–88: Dave Tretowicz, D
- 1989–90: Hugo Belanger, F; Scott Thomas, F
- 1990–91: Ed Henrich, D; Craig Conroy, F
- 1991–92: Brian Mueller, D; Todd Marchant, F; Patrice Robitaille, F; Marko Tuomainen, F
- 1993–94: Adam Wiesel, D; Jean-Francois Houle, F
- 1994–95: Dan Murphy, G; Chris Clark, F
- 1995–96: Mikko Ollila, D
- 1997–98: Willie Mitchell, D; Erik Cole, F
- 1998–99: Shawn Grant, G; Kerry Ellis-Toddington, D
- 2000–01: Rob McFeeters, F
- 2001–02: Randy Jones, D
- 2005–06: Shea Guthrie, F
- 2012–13: Paul Geiger, D
- 2013–14: James de Haas, D
- 2014–15: Kyle Summers, D
- 2016–17: Jake Kielly, G; Sheldon Rempal, F; Nico Sturm, F
- 2017–18: Jack Jacome, F
- 2020–21: Ethan Haider, G
- 2021–22: Ayrton Martino, F

== Clarkson Athletic Hall of Fame ==
The following is a list of people associated with Clarkson's men's ice hockey program who were elected into the Clarkson University Athletic Hall of Fame (induction date in parentheses).

- Corby Adams (1992)
- Al Graham (1992)
- Paul Pilon (1992)
- Ed Rowe (1992)
- Dave Taylor (1992)
- Pinky Ryan (1992)
- Wally Easton (1995)
- Ron Frazer (2004)
- Dave Fretz (2004)
- George MacLean (2004)
- John McLennan (2004)
- Bob Van Lammers (2004)
- Steve Warr (2004)
- Bruce Bullock (2005)
- Eddie MacDonald (2005)
- Colin Patterson (2005)
- Jack Porter (2005)
- Helen Cheel (2005)
- Len Ceglarski (2007)
- Terry Yurkiewicz (2007)
- Bob Empie (2008)
- Fred Silver (2008)
- Kevin Zappia (2008)
- Bill Harrison (2008)
- Murray Walker (2008)
- Art Smith (2010)
- Bill Blackwood (2012)
- Craig Conroy (2012)
- Tom Hurley (2012)
- Frank Rotunno (2012)
- Skip Demerski (2017)
- Craig Laughlin (2017)
- Bill Little (2017)
- Don Seale (2017)

== Statistical leaders ==
=== Career points leaders ===
Player	Years	GP	G	A	Pts	PIM
Dave Taylor	1973–77	116	98	153	251	
Kevin Zappia	1975–79	122	103	110	213	
Hugo Bélanger	1989–93	139	81	124	205	
Todd White	1993–97	143	90	108	198	
Marko Tuomainen	1991–95	135	82	109	191	
Steve Cruickshank	1978–82	129	87	103	190	
Ed Rowe	1954–57	66	87	95	182	
Patrice Robitaille	1991–95	135	72	103	175	
Marty McNally	1974–78	113	66	105	171	
Sid Tanchak	1975–79	125	77	93	170	
Luciano Borsato	1984–88	129	63	107	170	

=== Career goaltending leaders ===
GP = Games played; Min = Minutes played; GA = Goals against; SO = Shutouts; SV% = Save percentage; GAA = Goals against average

Minimum 20 games

Player	Years	GP	Min	W	L	T	GA	SO	SV%	GAA
Frank Marotte	2019–2020	34	2019	23	8	3	60	4	.938	1.78
Jake Kielly	2016–2019	114	6747	64	37	13	234	16	.923	2.08
Terry Yurkiewicz	1963–1966	53		43	10	0			.910	2.10
Ethan Langenegger	2024–2025	35	2074	22	10	2	74	1	.919	2.14
Wayne Gibbons	1961–1963	63							.900	2.20

Statistics current through the end of the 2024–25 season.

== Players ==
=== Olympians ===
This is a list of Clarkson alumni were a part of an Olympic team.

Name	Position	Clarkson Tenure	Team	Year	Finish
Thomas Hurley	Forward	1963–1966	(United States) USA	1968	6th
Dave Tretowicz	Defenseman	1987–1991	(United States) USA	1992	4th
Todd Marchant	Center	1991–1993	(United States) USA	1994	8th
Craig Conroy	Center	1990–1994	(United States) USA	2006	8th
Erik Cole	Left Wing	1997–2000	(United States) USA	2006	8th
David Leggio	Goaltender	2004–2008	(United States) USA	2018	7th
Nico Sturm	Center	2016–2019	(Germany) GER	2026	6th
Lukas Kälble	Defenseman	2021–2022	(Germany) GER	2026	6th
Haralds Egle	Center	2016–2020	(Latvia) LAT	2026	10th

=== Golden Knights in the NHL ===
As of July 1, 2025.

= NHL All-Star team	= NHL All-Star	= NHL All-Star and NHL All-Star team

Player	Position	Team(s)	Years	Games	Stanley Cups
Mark Borowiecki	Defense	OTT, NSH	2011–2023	458	0
Luciano Borsato	Center	WPG	1990–1995	203	0
Bruce Bullock	Goaltender	VAN	1972–1977	16	0
Mike Casselman	Right Wing	FLA	1995–1996	3	0
Chris Clark	Right Wing	CGY, WSH, CBJ	1999–2011	607	0
Grant Clitsome	Defense	CBJ, WIN	2009–2015	205	0
Erik Cole	Left Wing	CAR, EDM, MTL, DAL, DET	2001–2015	892	1
Craig Conroy	Center	MTL, STL, CGY, LAK	1994–2011	1,009	0
Brandon DeFazio	Left Wing	VAN	2014–2015	2	0
Steve Dubinsky	Center	CHI, CGY, NSH, STL	1993–2003	375	0
Josh Dunne	Center	CBJ, BUF	2020–Present	16	0
Ted Fauss	Defenseman	TOR	1986–1988	28	0
Kent Huskins	Defense	ANA, SJS, STL, DET, PHI	2006–2013	318	1
Randy Jones	Defense	PHI, LAK, TBL, WIN	2003–2012	365	0

Player	Position	Team(s)	Years	Games	Stanley Cups
Jarmo Kekäläinen	Left Wing	BOS, OTT	1989–1994	55	0
Craig Laughlin	Right Wing	MTL, WSH, LAK, TOR	1981–1989	549	0
Todd Marchant	Left Wing	NYR, EDM, CBJ, ANA	1993–2011	1,195	1
Willie Mitchell	Defense	NJD, MIN, DAL, VAN, LAK, FLA	1999–2016	907	2
Colin Patterson	Forward	CGY, BUF	1983–1993	504	1
Sheldon Rempal	Right Wing	LAK, CAR, VAN, VGK	2018–2024	21	0
Ben Sexton	Center	OTT	2017–2018	2	0
Nico Sturm	Center	MIN, COL, SJS, FLA	2018–Present	331	2
Don Sylvestri	Goaltender	BOS	1984–1985	3	0
Dave Taylor	Right Wing	LAK	1977–1994	1,111	0
Scott Thomas	Right Wing	BUF, LAK	1992–2001	63	0
Marko Tuomainen	Right Wing	EDM, LAK, NYI	1994–2002	79	0
Todd White	Center	CHI, PHI, OTT, MIN, ATL, NYR	1997–2011	653	0
Steve Zalewski	Center	SJS, NJD	2009–2012	10	0

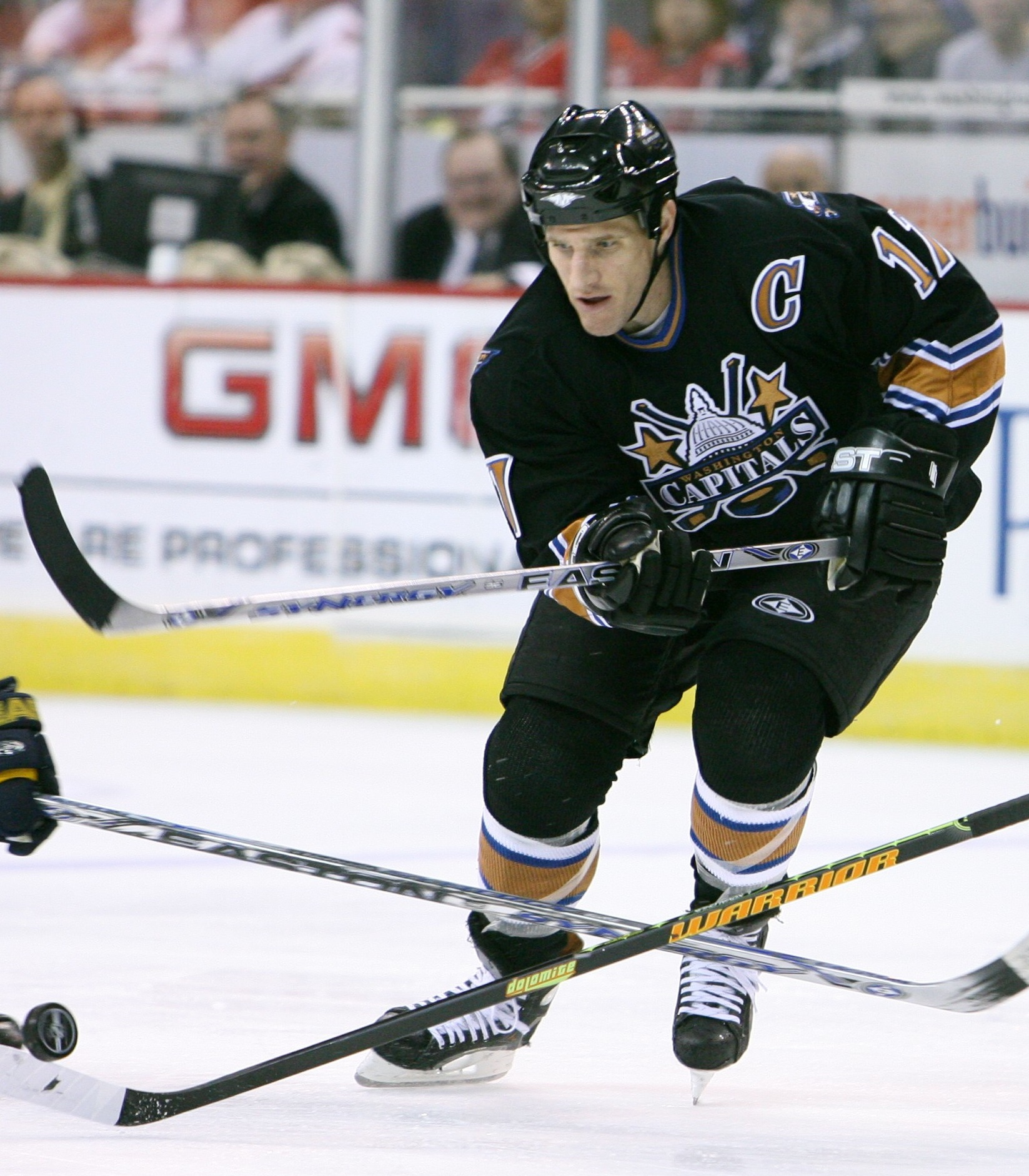
Chris Clark

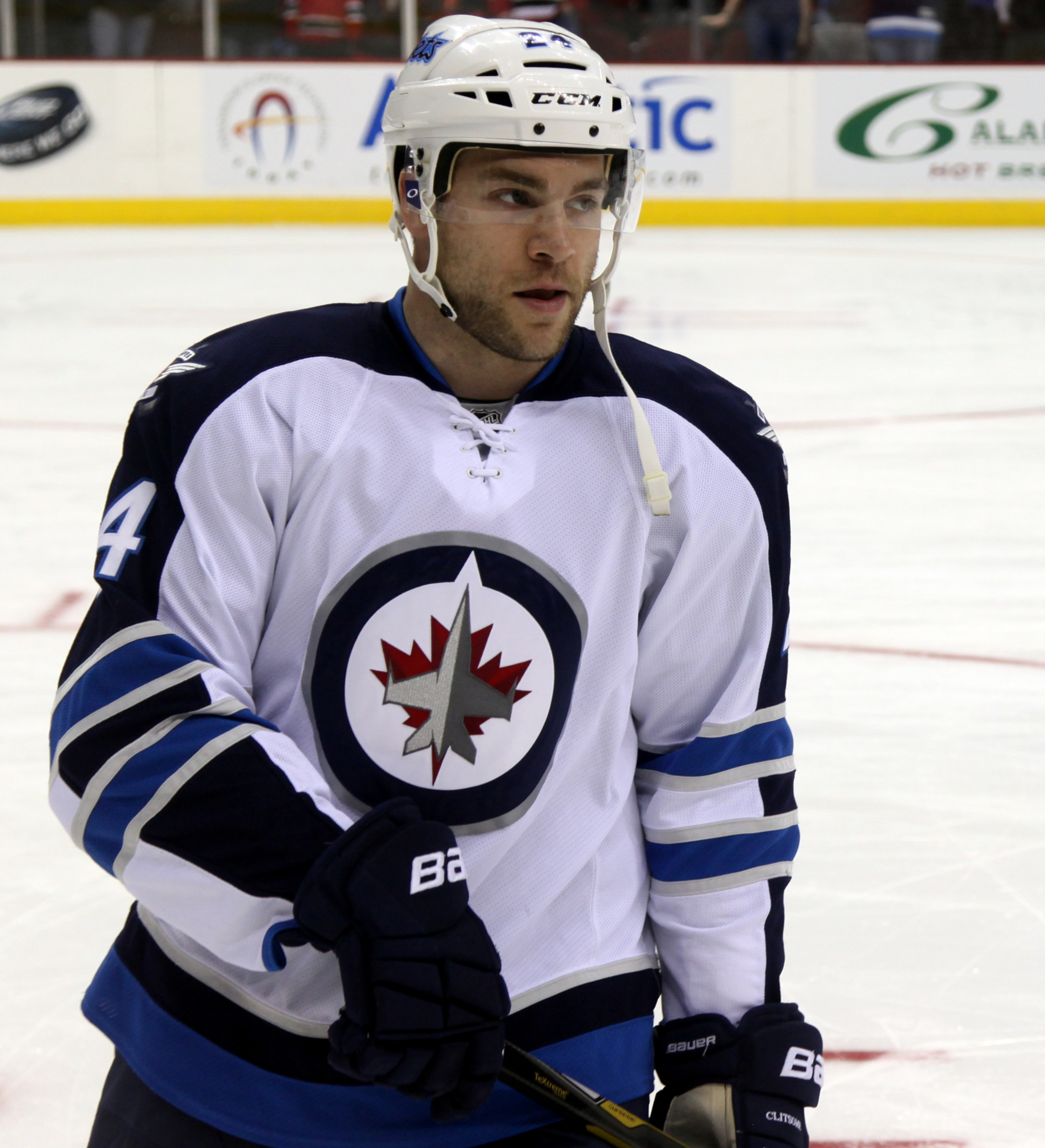
Grant Clitsome

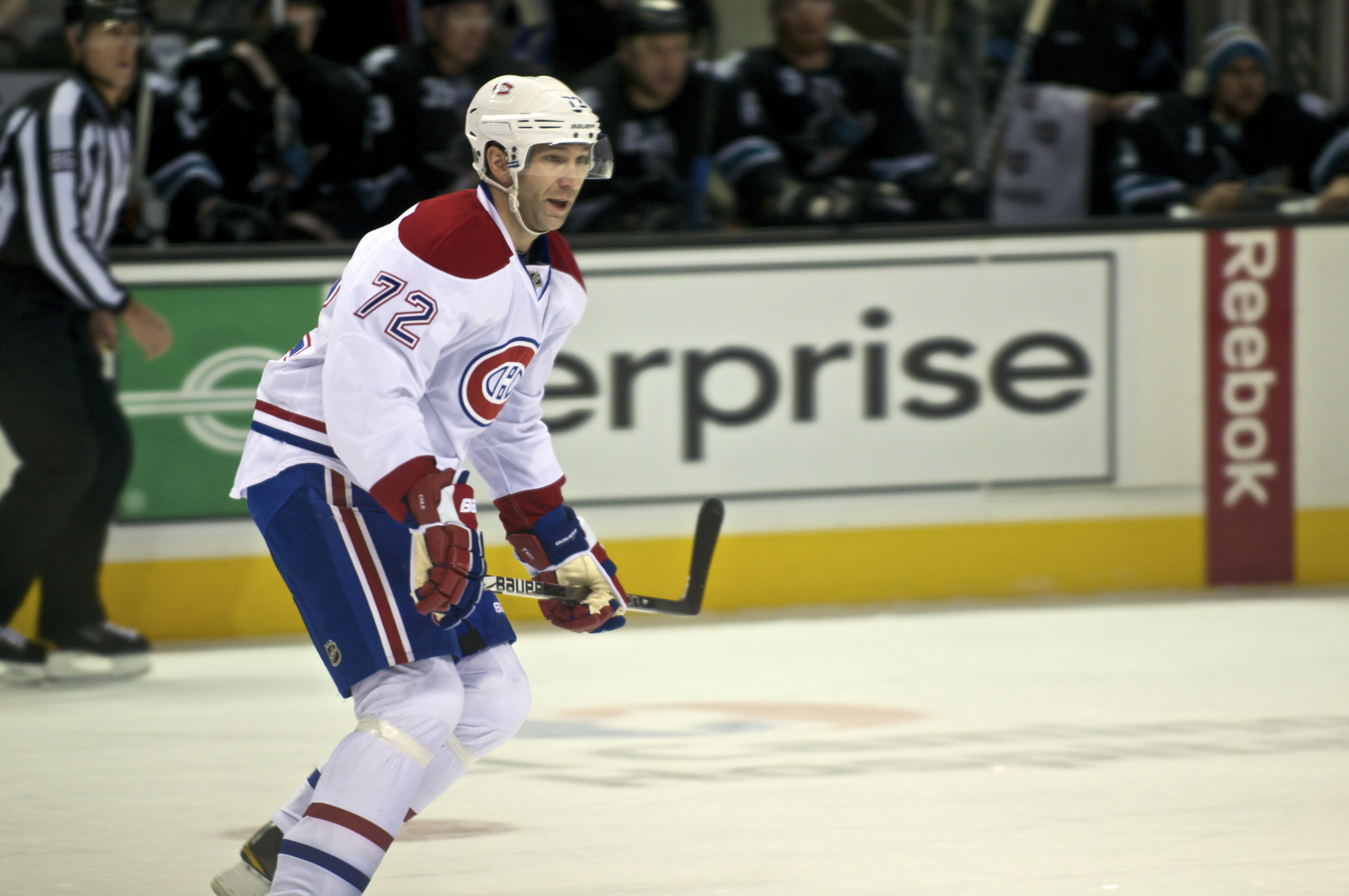
Erik Cole

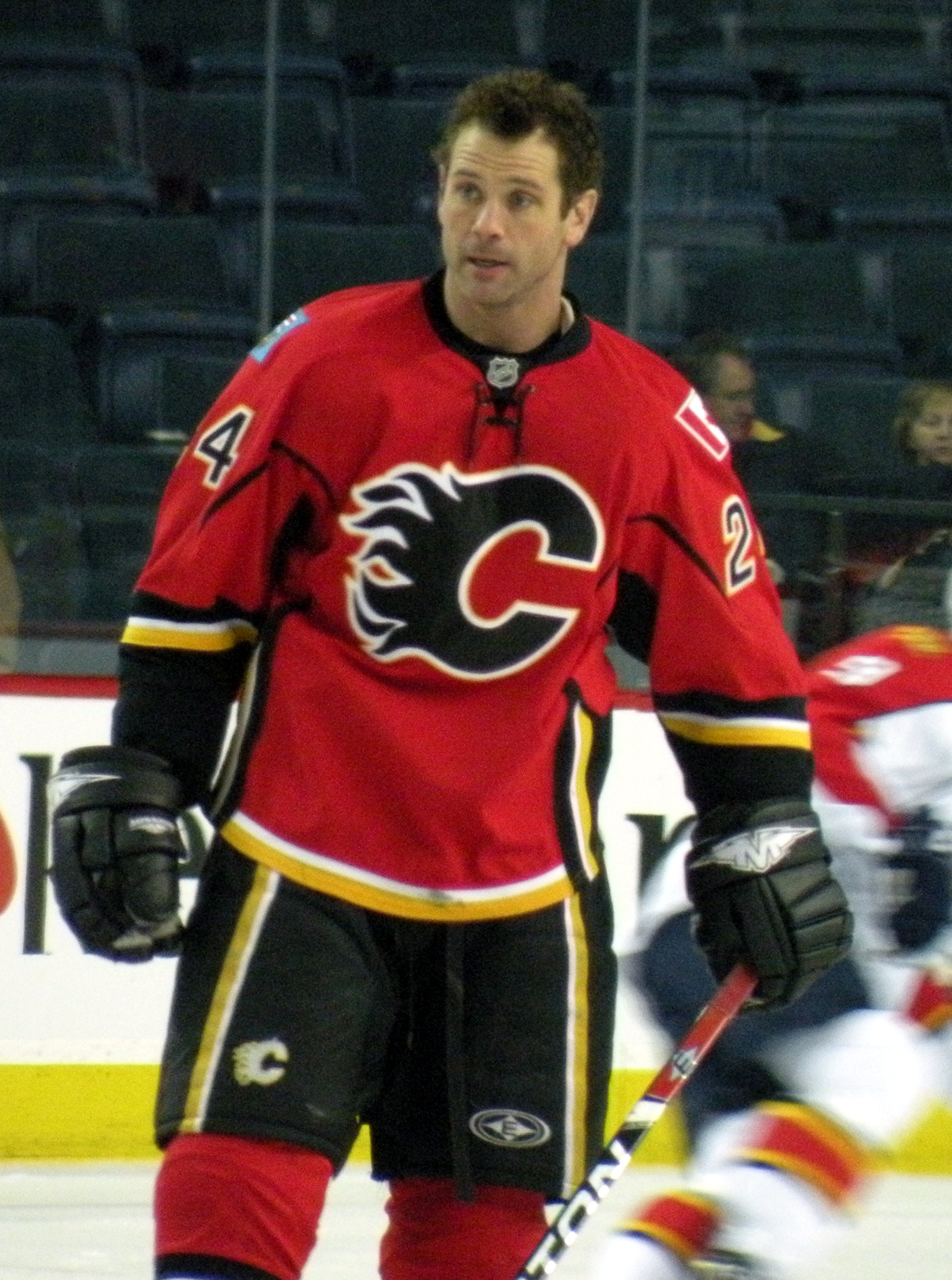
Craig Conroy

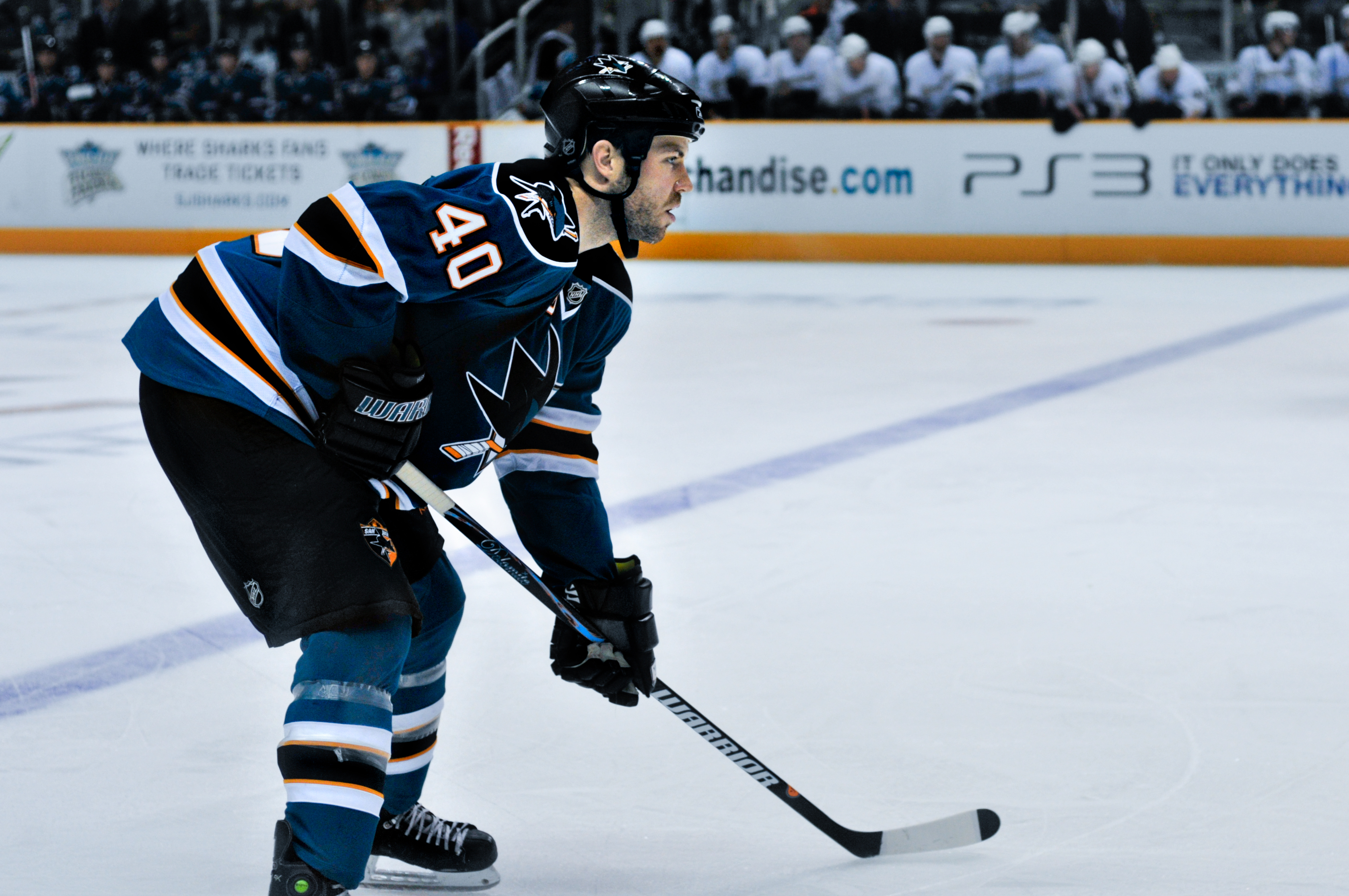
Kent Huskins

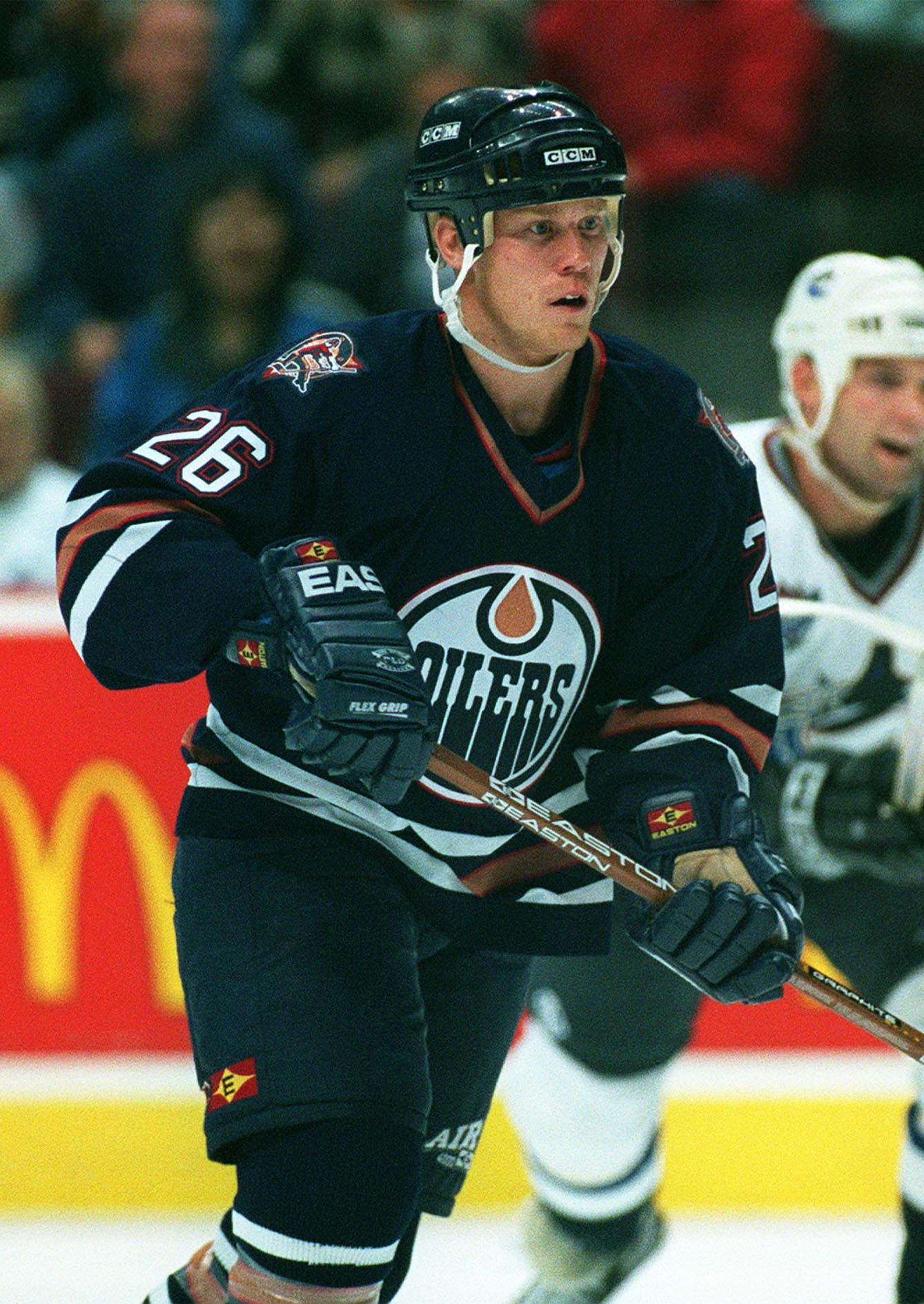
Todd Marchant

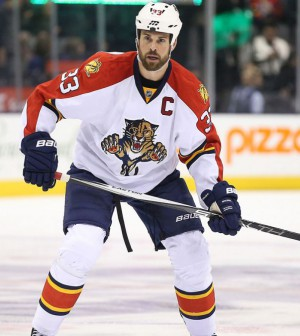
Willie Mitchell

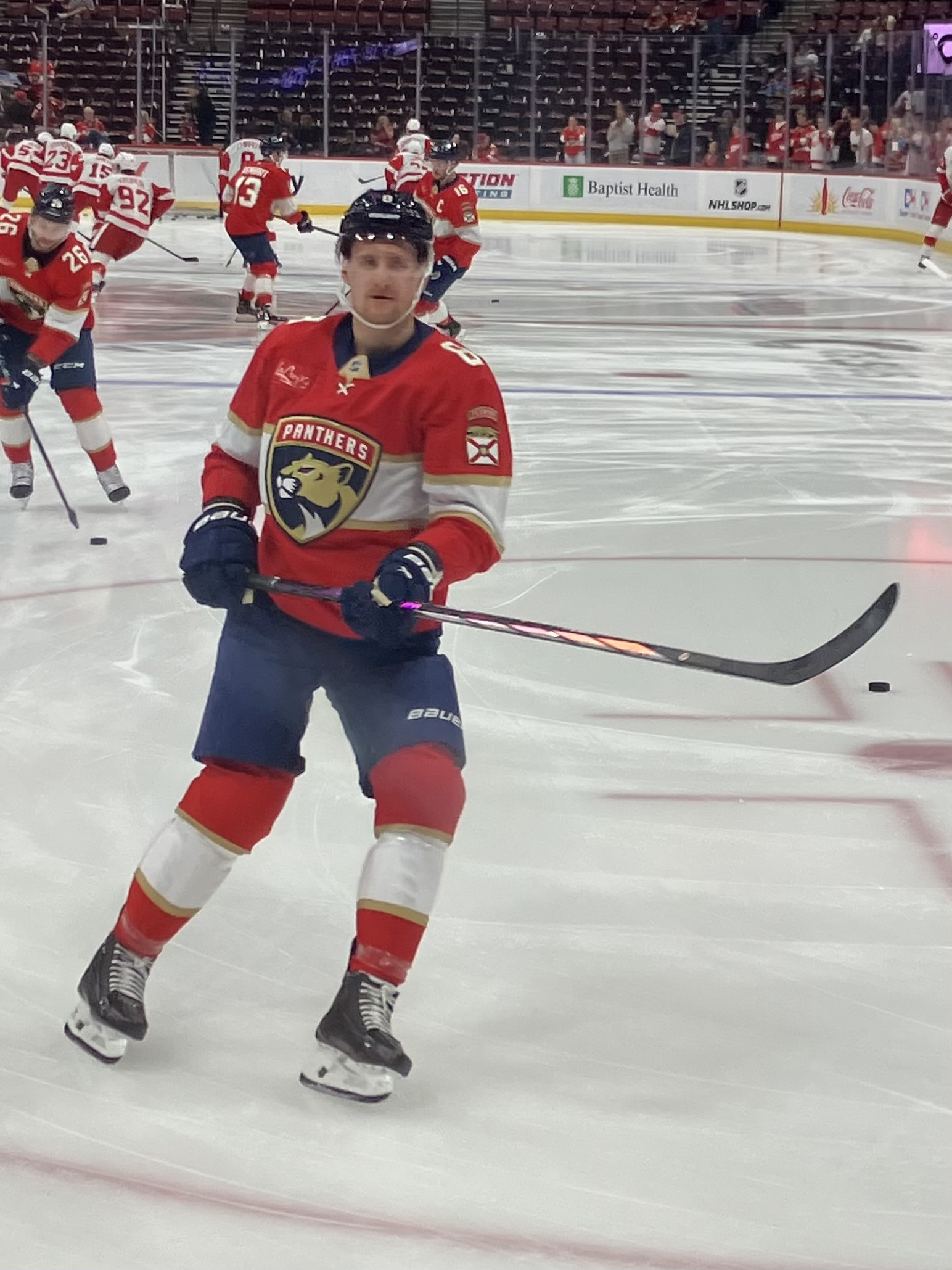
Nico Sturm

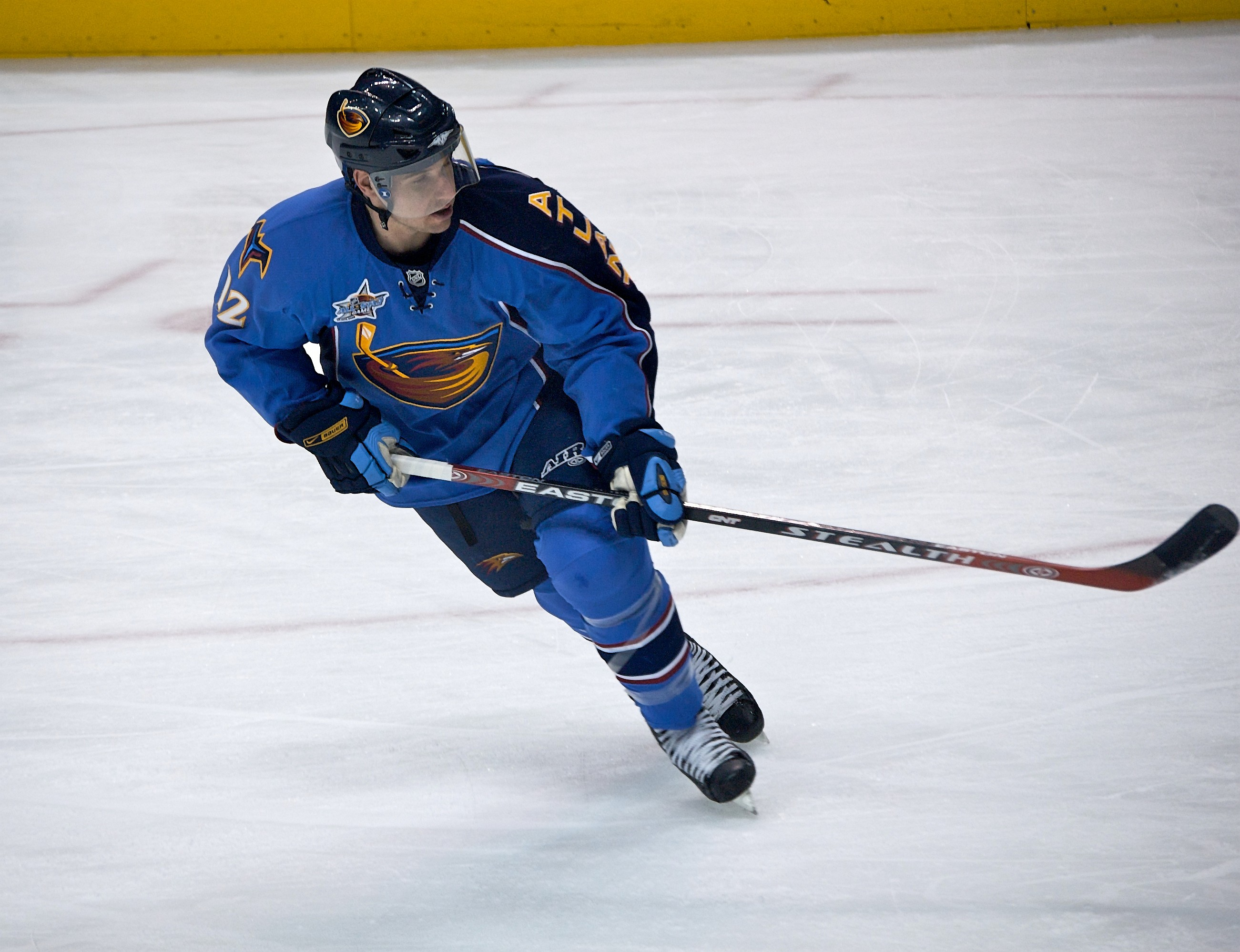
Todd White

=== WHA ===
Three players were members of WHA teams.

Player	Position	Team(s)	Years	Avco Cups
Bill Blackwood	Defenseman	IND	1977–1978	0
Mike Conroy	Forward	CLC	1975–1976	0
Steve Warr	Defenseman	OTN, TOT	1972–1974	0

=== Retired numbers ===
- 7 - Craig Conroy (1990–94)
- 22 - Craig Laughlin (1976–80)
- 24 - Dave Taylor (1974–77)
- 25 - Colin Patterson (1980–83)

=== Current roster ===
As of August 5, 2025.

No.	Nat.	Player	Class	Pos	Height	Weight	DoB	Hometown	Previous team	NHL rights
3	(Canada)	Noah Houle	Sophomore	D	6' 1" (1.85 m)	192 lb (87 kg)	2003-11-16	Montreal, Quebec	Lindenwood (NCAA)	—
5	(United States)	Tristan Sarsland	Senior	D	6' 0" (1.83 m)	185 lb (84 kg)	2004-02-25	Wayzata, Minnesota	Fairbanks Ice Dogs (NAHL)	—
9	(United States)	Erik Bargholtz	Senior	F	6' 2" (1.88 m)	203 lb (92 kg)	2001-04-12	Appleton, Wisconsin	Fargo Force (USHL)	—
11	(United States)	Luka Sukovic	Sophomore	F	6' 3" (1.91 m)	215 lb (98 kg)	2003-11-06	Lincolnshire, Illinois	Bonnyville Pontiacs (AJHL)	—
13	(United States)	Shawn O'Donnell	Junior	F	5' 11" (1.8 m)	181 lb (82 kg)	2003-06-21	Pittsburgh, Pennsylvania	Massachusetts Lowell (HEA)	—
14	(United States)	Talon Sigurdson	Junior	F	6' 1" (1.85 m)	175 lb (79 kg)	2002-01-11	Sartell, Minnesota	Des Moines Buccaneers (USHL)	—
16	(United States)	Ryan Bottrill	Senior	F	6' 1" (1.85 m)	185 lb (84 kg)	2002-02-04	Chandler, Arizona	Brown (ECAC)	—
19	(Canada)	Owen Van Steensel	Freshman	F	5' 10" (1.78 m)	185 lb (84 kg)	2004-08-04	Ilderton, Ontario	North Bay Battalion (OHL)	—
20	(United States)	Jared Mangan	Sophomore	F	5' 10" (1.78 m)	172 lb (78 kg)	2003-04-08	Charleston, South Carolina	Lincoln Stars (USHL)	—
21	(Canada)	Matthew Mayich	Freshman	D	6' 3" (1.91 m)	205 lb (93 kg)	2004-12-21	Stoney Creek, Ontario	Ottawa 67's (OHL)	STL, 170th overall 2023
26	(Canada)	William-Charles Bishop	Freshman	D	6' 0" (1.83 m)	201 lb (91 kg)	2004-04-20	Baie-D'Urfé, Quebec	Val-d'Or Foreurs (QMJHL)	—
27	(Canada)	Tate Taylor	Sophomore	D	5' 11" (1.8 m)	182 lb (83 kg)	2004-05-03	Richmond, British Columbia	Fargo Force (USHL)	—
28	(Canada)	Conyr Hellyer	Freshman	F	5' 10" (1.78 m)	174 lb (79 kg)	2004-08-30	Okotoks, Alberta	Penticton Vees (BCHL)	—
29	(Canada)	Luke Pakulak	Sophomore	F	6' 4" (1.93 m)	205 lb (93 kg)	2003-07-30	Surrey, British Columbia	Vernon Vipers (BCHL)	—
30	(United States)	Shane Soderwall	Junior	G	6' 2" (1.88 m)	185 lb (84 kg)	2002-09-23	Algonquin, Illinois	Curry (CNE)	—
35	(Canada)	Keenan Rancier	Graduate	G	6' 2" (1.88 m)	183 lb (83 kg)	2000-06-21	Victoria, British Columbia	Vermont (HEA)	—
44	(Canada)	Ty Brassington	Sophomore	D	6' 2" (1.88 m)	198 lb (90 kg)	2004-04-14	White Rock, British Columbia	Surrey Eagles (BCHL)	—
55	(Canada)	Jack Sparkes	Sophomore	D	6' 8" (2.03 m)	238 lb (108 kg)	2003-10-20	Toronto, Ontario	Chilliwack Chiefs (BCHL)	LAK, 180th overall 2022
60	(United States)	Nick Avakyan	Freshman	G	6' 1" (1.85 m)	185 lb (84 kg)	2004-02-18	Glendale, California	Johnstown Tomahawks (NAHL)	—
72	(Canada)	Bryce Sookro	Freshman	D	6' 1" (1.85 m)	223 lb (101 kg)	2004-03-28	Nelson, British Columbia	Cranbrook Bucks (BCHL)	—
81	(Canada)	Jace Letourneau	Freshman	F	6' 5" (1.96 m)	210 lb (95 kg)	2004-03-04	Arnprior, Ontario	Brooks Bandits (BCHL)	—
86	(Canada)	Adrian Misaljevic	Freshman	F	5' 11" (1.8 m)	174 lb (79 kg)	2004-07-10	Woodbridge, Ontario	Kitchener Rangers (OHL)	—
91	(Canada)	Mikael Huchette	Sophomore	F	6' 3" (1.91 m)	214 lb (97 kg)	2003-08-01	Longueuil, Quebec	Concordia (OUA)	—
92	(Canada)	Justin Côté	Freshman	F	5' 6" (1.68 m)	170 lb (77 kg)	2004-07-11	Salaberry-de-Valleyfield, Quebec	Québec Remparts (QMJHL)	—

== See also ==
- Clarkson Golden Knights women's ice hockey
