= Ed Rowe =

Canadian ice hockey player

- Born: November 2, 1935 Cornwall, Ontario, Canada
- Died: June 21, 2010 (aged 74) Peterborough, Ontario, Canada
- Height: 5 ft 10 in (178 cm)
- Weight: 161 lb (73 kg; 11 st 7 lb)
- Position: Center
- Shot: Right
- Played for: Clarkson
- Playing career: 1954–1957

Edward James 'Eddie' Rowe (died June 21, 2010) was a Canadian ice hockey center who was a two-time All-American for Clarkson and led the team in scoring during its undefeated season in 1955–56.

== Career ==
Rowe was a star player for his junior team in Cornwall, helping the team win both the city and regional championship in 1953 while collecting both the scoring title and MVP trophy. After the season he began attending Clarkson College of Technology in nearby Potsdam, New York and spent a year on the freshman team. He joined the varsity squad in his second year and instantly provided a scoring punch, leading the team with 29 goals just 21 games.

In his junior season Rowe became the focal point of the offense and the team ran roughshod over their opponents. Rowe finished with 65 points in 23 games to lead the NCAA in scoring but it was Clarkson's 23–0 record that was really astounding. The Golden Knights finished the first recognized undefeated season in NCAA history (other teams had undefeated records but played fewer than 10 games) and were offered a bid to the 1956 NCAA Tournament. There was, however, a problem; eight members of the team were 4-year varsity players and NCAA regulations at the time limited players to 3 years of varsity play. For Clarkson to accept those eight players wouldn't be allowed to participate. Head coach Bill Harrison left it up to the team to decide what they wanted to do and the players unanimously decided that if some of them couldn't play none of them would play. Even without a tournament appearance Rowe was named as an AHCA First Team All-American.

Rowe was named team captain for his senior season and while the Golden Knights winning streak ended at 25, they did finish the regular season with an 18–2 record. Despite not winning their conference Clarkson was offered a bid to the NCAA Tournament again and without any 4-year players they were able to make their first appearance in the national tournament. In the semifinal against Colorado College Rowe assisted on the game's opening goal but the Tigers were by far the better team. Clarkson was outshot 60 to 21 in the game but a superhuman effort from goaltender Eddie MacDonald kept the score close. After losing 3–5 Clarkson met Harvard in the consolation game and the two teams fought a tough, defensive battle. Either side could only manage a single goal in regulation and the game required overtime to finish. Both goalies remained stout in the first extra frame and the match became the first NCAA contest to require a fifth period. At the 6:51 mark Rowe fired home the final goal of his college career, allowing Clarkson to finish 3rd in the tournament.

While Rowe's playing career ended upon his graduation, he continued in the game as an executive. Rowe earned a degree in mechanical engineering and worked for General Electric for many years. After he settled in Peterborough, Rowe worked in the Petes organization for 24 years, serving as both president and governor during that time. He was inducted into the Cornwall, Ontario Sports Hall of Fame in 1982 and was an inaugural member of the Clarkson University Athletic Hall of Fame in 1992.

== Personal ==
Rowe was diagnosed with Alzheimer's disease in 2003 and succumbed to the condition in 2010.

== Statistics ==
=== Regular season and playoffs ===
			Regular season					Playoffs
Season	Team	League	GP	G	A	Pts	PIM	GP	G	A	Pts	PIM
1954–55	Clarkson	Tri-State League	21	29	25	54	—	—	—	—	—	—
1955–56	Clarkson	Tri-State League	23	27	38	65	—	—	—	—	—	—
1956–57	Clarkson	Tri-State League	22	31	32	63	—	—	—	—	—	—
NCAA totals			66	87	95	182	—	—	—	—	—	—

== Awards and honors ==
Award	Year
AHCA First Team All-American	1955–56
AHCA First Team All-American	1956–57

Awards and achievements
Preceded by Bill Cleary	NCAA Ice Hockey Scoring Champion; 1955–56	Succeeded by Bob Cleary / Bill Hay
