= Scott Thomas (ice hockey) =

American ice hockey player (born 1970)

- Born: January 18, 1970 (age 56) Buffalo, New York, U.S.
- Height: 6 ft 2 in (188 cm)
- Weight: 202 lb (92 kg; 14 st 6 lb)
- Position: Right wing
- Shot: Right
- Played for: Buffalo Sabres; Los Angeles Kings
- NHL draft: 56th overall, 1989; Buffalo Sabres
- Playing career: 1992–2003

John Scott Thomas (born January 18, 1970) is an American former professional ice hockey right wing. He played 63 games in the National Hockey League with the Buffalo Sabres and Los Angeles Kings between 1992 and 2001. The rest of his career, which lasted from 1992 to 2003, was spent in the minor leagues.

== Early life ==
Thomas was born in Buffalo, New York. He played in the 1983 Quebec International Pee-Wee Hockey Tournament with a minor ice hockey team from Buffalo.

== Career ==
Thomas was drafted in the third round, 56th overall, by the Buffalo Sabres in the 1989 NHL entry draft. He played 39 games with the Sabres over two seasons, 1992–93 and 1993–94.

Thomas then spent several seasons playing in the International Hockey League. He returned to the National Hockey League late in his career, appearing in 24 games with the Los Angeles Kings in 2000–01. Thomas scored the first goal of the "Stunner at Staples" play-off game in which Los Angeles rallied to beat the Detroit Red Wings after being down 3-0 with 6:07 remaining in the game. The Kings would eventually win the series in six games.

He finished his career as a member of the American Hockey League's Cleveland Barons in the 2002–03 season.

Thomas and Peter Ciavaglia had been the only two Buffalo-area natives to play for the Buffalo Sabres until Patrick Kaleta made his debut as a Sabre during the 2006–07 season. Tim Kennedy also played for his home town Buffalo Sabres.

== Career statistics ==
=== Regular season and playoffs ===
| | | | Regular season | | | | | Playoffs |
| Season | Team | League | GP | G | A | Pts | PIM | GP | G | A | Pts | PIM |
|---|---|---|---|---|---|---|---|---|---|---|---|---|
| 1987–88 | Nicols Schools | CIASAA | 16 | 23 | 39 | 62 | 62 | — | — | — | — | — |
| 1988–89 | Nicols Schools | CIASAA | 17 | 38 | 52 | 90 | — | — | — | — | — | — |
| 1989–90 | Clarkson University | ECAC | 34 | 19 | 13 | 32 | 95 | — | — | — | — | — |
| 1990–91 | Clarkson University | ECAC | 40 | 28 | 14 | 42 | 89 | — | — | — | — | — |
| 1991–92 | Clarkson University | ECAC | 30 | 25 | 21 | 46 | 57 | — | — | — | — | — |
| 1991–92 | Rochester Americans | AHL | — | — | — | — | — | 9 | 0 | 1 | 1 | 17 |
| 1992–93 | Buffalo Sabres | NHL | 7 | 1 | 1 | 2 | 15 | — | — | — | — | — |
| 1992–93 | Rochester Americans | AHL | 65 | 32 | 27 | 59 | 38 | 17 | 8 | 5 | 13 | 6 |
| 1993–94 | Buffalo Sabres | NHL | 32 | 2 | 2 | 4 | 8 | — | — | — | — | — |
| 1993–94 | Rochester Americans | AHL | 11 | 4 | 5 | 9 | 0 | — | — | — | — | — |
| 1994–95 | Rochester Americans | AHL | 55 | 21 | 25 | 46 | 115 | 5 | 4 | 0 | 4 | 4 |
| 1995–96 | Cincinnati Cyclones | IHL | 78 | 32 | 28 | 60 | 54 | 17 | 13 | 2 | 15 | 4 |
| 1996–97 | Cincinnati Cyclones | IHL | 71 | 32 | 29 | 61 | 46 | 3 | 0 | 0 | 0 | 0 |
| 1997–98 | Detroit Vipers | IHL | 44 | 11 | 16 | 27 | 18 | — | — | — | — | — |
| 1997–98 | Manitoba Moose | IHL | 26 | 12 | 4 | 16 | 8 | 3 | 0 | 1 | 1 | 2 |
| 1998–99 | Manitoba Moose | IHL | 78 | 45 | 25 | 70 | 32 | 5 | 3 | 4 | 7 | 4 |
| 1999–00 | Long Beach Ice Dogs | IHL | 52 | 15 | 16 | 31 | 18 | 6 | 2 | 1 | 3 | 6 |
| 2000–01 | Los Angeles Kings | NHL | 24 | 3 | 1 | 4 | 9 | 12 | 1 | 0 | 1 | 4 |
| 2000–01 | Manitoba Moose | IHL | 22 | 9 | 14 | 23 | 21 | 3 | 1 | 2 | 3 | 0 |
| 2001–02 | Manchester Monarchs | AHL | 56 | 14 | 29 | 43 | 6 | 5 | 1 | 0 | 1 | 4 |
| 2002–03 | Cleveland Barons | AHL | 23 | 7 | 3 | 10 | 6 | — | — | — | — | — |
| IHL totals | | | 371 | 156 | 132 | 288 | 197 | 37 | 19 | 10 | 29 | 16 |
| NHL totals | | | 63 | 6 | 4 | 10 | 32 | 12 | 1 | 0 | 1 | 4 |

== Awards and honors ==
| Award | Year |
|---|---|
| All-ECAC Hockey Rookie Team | 1989–90 |
| ECAC Hockey All-Tournament Team | 1991 |
