= Fred Parker (ice hockey) =

Coaching career (HC unless noted)
- 1998–2003: Kitchener Rangers (scout)
- 2001–2002: Ottawa Jr. Senators
- 2002: Clarkson (assistant)
- 2002–2003: Clarkson
- 2004–2006: Kitchener Rangers (assistant)
- 2006–2010: Carleton University
- 2010–2013: Calgary Flames (scout)

Head coaching record
- Overall: 12-17-3 (.422)

Fred Parker is a former ice hockey coach. A graduate of St. Francis Xavier University (1989), Fred has divided his career among many teams at varying levels, including serving as Clarkson's interim head coach after the firing of Mark Morris in 2002.

== Head coaching record ==
=== College ===
Record table
Season	Team	Overall	Conference	Standing	Postseason
Clarkson Golden Knights (ECAC Hockey) (2002–2003)
2002–03 †	Clarkson	12-17-3 †	9-9-3 †	t-7th	ECAC First Round
Clarkson:		12-17-3	9-9-3		
Total:		12-17-3			
National champion Postseason invitational champion Conference regular season champion Conference regular season and conference tournament champion Division regular season champion Division regular season and conference tournament champion Conference tournament champion

† Parker was a midseason replacement
