= Dave Fretz =

American ice hockey player (born 1962)

- Born: July 5, 1962 (age 64) Toronto, Ontario, Canada
- Height: 5 ft 6 in (168 cm)
- Weight: 170 lb (77 kg; 12 st 2 lb)
- Position: Defenseman
- Shot: Right
- Played for: Clarkson
- National team: Canada
- Playing career: 1981–1985

David Fretz is a Canadian retired ice hockey defenseman who was a two-time All-American for Clarkson.

== Career ==
Fretz began attending Clarkson University in the fall of 1981 and quickly became a mainstay on the blueline. He would lead the defensive corps in scoring in three of his four seasons with the Golden Knights and help the team post three 20+ win seasons in his time. Prior to his junior season, Fretz joined Team Canada in their run up to the 1984 Winter Olympics but was not retained for the competition. He did, however, help the team win the 1984 Spengler Cup, the first for Canada in the 58 years of the series.

In his third collegiate season, he helped the team to its best postseason finish in eleven year in 1984 and was named an All-American that season. He was an alternate captain for his senior season and ended his playing career upon his graduation. He was inducted into the Clarkson Athletic Hall of Fame in 2004 and was named to the ECAC Hockey All-decade team.

== Statistics ==
=== Regular season and playoffs ===
			Regular Season					Playoffs
Season	Team	League	GP	G	A	Pts	PIM	GP	G	A	Pts	PIM
1979–80	Pickering Panthers	MJBHL	41	6	34	40	28	—	—	—	—	—
1980–81	Pickering Panthers	MJBHL	42	14	28	42	55	—	—	—	—	—
1981–82	Clarkson	ECAC Hockey	35	6	17	23	22	—	—	—	—	—
1982–83	Clarkson	ECAC Hockey	31	8	19	27	26	—	—	—	—	—
1983–84	Clarkson	ECAC Hockey	34	10	17	27	54	—	—	—	—	—
1984–85	Clarkson	ECAC Hockey	32	7	18	25	50	—	—	—	—	—
MJBHL totals			83	20	62	82	83	—	—	—	—	—
NCAA totals			132	31	71	102	152	—	—	—	—	—

=== International ===
Year	Team	Event	Result	GP	G	A	Pts	PIM
1984	Canada	Spengler Cup	Gold	4	0	0	0	0

== Awards and honors ==
Award	Year
All-ECAC Hockey Second Team	1982–83
AHCA East First-Team All-American	1983–84
Spengler Cup All-Star Team	1984
All-ECAC Hockey First Team	1984–85
AHCA East First-Team All-American	1984–85
