= Brian Mueller (ice hockey) =

American ice hockey player (born 1972)

- Born: June 2, 1972 (age 54) Liverpool, New York, USA
- Height: 5 ft 11 in (180 cm)
- Weight: 227 lb (103 kg; 16 st 3 lb)
- Position: Defenseman
- Shot: Left
- Played for: Clarkson; Springfield Falcons; Richmond Renegades; Manitoba Moose; Québec Rafales; Hershey Bears; HC Thurgau; HPK; Saginaw Gears; Port Huron Border Cats; Detroit Vipers
- NHL draft: 141st overall, 1991; Hartford Whalers
- Playing career: 1990–2000
Medal record
Representing United States
Men's ice hockey
World Junior Championships
Bronze medal – third place	1992 Germany

Brian Mueller is an American ice hockey coach and former defenseman who was a two-time All-American for Clarkson.

== Career ==
Mueller was drafted by the Hartford Whalers after a successful season of junior hockey and began attending Clarkson University the following fall. He arrived in Potsdam immediately after the Golden Knights' run to the Frozen Four, adding depth to the team as a freshman. Over the winter break, Mueller was also selected as a member of Team USA for the 1992 World Junior Championships. While he went scoreless in 7 games, he was part of the defensive corps that shut down opponents for 5 wins and enabled the US to win the bronze medal, just the second medal the team had earned in the 16-year history of the tournament.

For his sophomore season Mueller increased his point total and helped the Golden Knights win the conference tournament. Unfortunately, for the second straight year, Clarkson flamed out in the opening round of the NCAA Tournament. In his first two seasons Mueller had been a stable defender for the Golden Knights, but he turned into an offensive dynamo during his junior year. He finished second in the nation for scoring by defensemen and was named an All-American. Unfortunately for Mueller, Clarkson lost in the conference semifinal and ended up getting left out of the national tournament.

Mueller nearly repeated his offensive production as a senior but was able to help the team finish atop ECAC Hockey. Clarkson was again felled in the semifinal, but they were able to secure a bid to the 1995 NCAA Tournament. The Golden Knights got a home game for the opening round; however, they were set against defending champion Lake Superior State. While the Lakers weren't as good as the year before, they were battle tested and the team managed to fight back against Clarkson and win a hard-fought road game 5–4.

After graduating, Mueller began his professional career spending most of his first two seasons with the Springfield Falcons. He headed to Europe in 1997 and spent most of the year with HPK before returning to North America. Mueller rounded out his career with a parts of two seasons in lower-level minor leagues and retired in 2000.

After his playing days were over, Mueller turned to coaching, working with junior players in Michigan, Wisconsin, and Illinois. He was named Vice President of Hockey Operations for a program in the Chicago area and led teams to two national junior championships in 2012 and 2016. After the second title, Mueller was hired by the Pittsburgh Penguins as a head coach and executive director of the UPMC Lemieux Sports Complex Hockey Academy and continues to work in that role as of 2021.

== Statistics ==
=== Regular season and playoffs ===
			Regular Season					Playoffs
Season	Team	League	GP	G	A	Pts	PIM	GP	G	A	Pts	PIM
1990–91	South Kent School	CT–HS	32	21	30	51	—	—	—	—	—	—
1991–92	Clarkson	ECAC Hockey	29	4	13	17	32	—	—	—	—	—
1992–93	Clarkson	ECAC Hockey	32	6	23	29	12	—	—	—	—	—
1993–94	Clarkson	ECAC Hockey	34	17	39	56	60	—	—	—	—	—
1994–95	Clarkson	ECAC Hockey	36	12	42	54	56	—	—	—	—	—
1995–96	Springfield Falcons	AHL	51	7	12	19	49	2	0	0	0	0
1995–96	Richmond Renegades	ECHL	3	1	1	2	2	3	0	2	2	0
1996–97	Springfield Falcons	AHL	42	7	20	27	28	7	0	2	2	0
1996–97	Manitoba Moose	IHL	6	1	1	2	2	—	—	—	—	—
1996–97	Québec Rafales	IHL	10	0	0	0	0	—	—	—	—	—
1997–98	Hershey Bears	AHL	2	0	0	0	0	—	—	—	—	—
1997–98	HPK	SM-liiga	27	2	4	6	26	—	—	—	—	—
1997–98	HC Thurgau	NLB	1	0	2	2	0	5	3	0	3	14
1998–99	Saginaw Gears	UHL	51	12	20	32	38	—	—	—	—	—
1998–99	Port Huron Border Cats	UHL	7	0	7	7	10	—	—	—	—	—
1998–99	Detroit Vipers	IHL	12	1	2	3	4	1	0	1	1	0
1999–00	Saginaw Gears	UHL	26	3	10	13	36	—	—	—	—	—
NCAA totals			131	39	117	156	160	—	—	—	—	—
AHL totals			95	14	32	46	77	9	0	2	2	0
IHL totals			28	2	3	5	6	1	0	1	1	0
UHL totals			84	15	37	52	84	—	—	—	—	—

=== International ===
Year	Team	Event	Result	GP	G	A	Pts	PIM
1992	United States	WJC	Bronze	7	0	0	0	0

== Awards and honors ==
Award	Year
All-ECAC Hockey First Team	1993–94
AHCA East First-Team All-American	1993–94
All-ECAC Hockey First Team	1994–95
AHCA East First-Team All-American	1994–95
ECAC Hockey All-Tournament Team	1995
