= Brian Shields =

Canadian ice hockey player

- Born: 1955 (age 70–71) Scarborough, Ontario, Canada
- Position: Goaltender
- Played for: Clarkson
- NHL draft: Undrafted
- Playing career: 1973–1977

Brian Shields is a retired Canadian ice hockey goaltender who was a two-time All-American for Clarkson.

== Career ==
Shields played junior hockey for the Pembroke Lumber Kings, helping the team win the league championship in 1973 and then progressed all the way to the Centennial Cup final before losing. After winning the eastern championship, Shields began attending Clarkson University as part of Jerry York's second recruiting class. Shields played in just 5 games for a team that finished below .500 and returned to Pembroke the following season to finished out his junior eligibility. While the team wasn't as good as it had been two years earlier, Shields still helped the Lumber Kings finish atop the league standings and reach the semifinals.

York was able to convince Shields to come back to Clarkson and become the team's starting goaltender. Shields allowed an average of almost four and a half goals per game but the team was built around the offense provided by future NHLer Dave Taylor. Despite allowing such a large number of goals, Shields was named to both the All-ECAC and All-American teams for the season as Clarkson finished fourth in their conference. For his final season, Shields' numbers improved mightily, allowing nearly a full goal less per game and backstopping the Golden Knights to a first-place finish. Clarkson was expected to make the 1977 NCAA Tournament but the team was stunned by a 6–7 loss to Boston University in the conference semifinal. While the NCAA selection committee had recently changed the rules permitting them to add up to four additional teams to the tournament format as they saw fit, Clarkson lost the consolation game 4–5 and gave the committee no reason to include a team that couldn't win when it counted.

Shields retired as a player after graduating from Clarkson. He was later named to the ECAC Hockey all-decade team.

== Statistics ==
=== Regular season and playoffs ===
| | | | Regular season | | | | | | | | | Playoffs |
| Season | Team | League | GP | W | L | T | MIN | GA | SO | GAA | SV% | GP | W | L | MIN | GA | SO | GAA | SV% |
|---|---|---|---|---|---|---|---|---|---|---|---|---|---|---|---|---|---|---|---|
| 1971–72 | Pembroke Lumber Kings | CJAHL | — | — | — | — | — | — | — | — | — | — | — | — | — | — | — | — | — |
| 1972–73 | Pembroke Lumber Kings | CJAHL | — | — | — | — | — | — | 3 | 3.46 | — | — | — | — | — | — | — | — | — |
| 1973–74 | Clarkson | ECAC Hockey | 5 | 0 | — | 0 | — | — | 0 | 6.00 | .815 | — | — | — | — | — | — | — | — |
| 1974–75 | Pembroke Lumber Kings | CJAHL | 24 | — | — | — | — | — | — | 3.92 | — | — | — | — | — | — | — | — | — |
| 1975–76 | Clarkson | ECAC Hockey | 25 | 18 | — | 0 | — | — | 0 | 4.41 | .885 | — | — | — | — | — | — | — | — |
| 1976–77 | Clarkson | ECAC Hockey | 32 | 26 | — | 0 | 1850 | 111 | 1 | 3.60 | .896 | — | — | — | — | — | — | — | — |
| NCAA totals | | | 60 | 44 | 13 | 0 | — | — | 1 | 4.60 | .865 | — | — | — | — | — | — | — | — |

== Awards and honors ==
| Award | Year |
|---|---|
| All-ECAC Hockey First Team | 1975–76 |
| AHCA East All-American | 1975–76 |
| All-ECAC Hockey First Team | 1976–77 |
| AHCA East All-American | 1976–77 |
