= Dave Tretowicz =

American ice hockey player

- Born: March 15, 1969 (age 57) Pittsfield, Massachusetts, U.S.
- Height: 5 ft 11 in (180 cm)
- Weight: 196 lb (89 kg; 14 st 0 lb)
- Position: Defense
- Played for: Phoenix Roadrunners; Fort Wayne Komets
- NHL draft: 231st overall, 1988; Calgary Flames
- Playing career: 1987–1994

Dave Tretowicz (born March 15, 1969) is an American former professional ice hockey player. In 1988, he was drafted in the NHL by the Calgary Flames. He competed in the men's tournament at the 1992 Winter Olympics.

== Biography ==
Tretowicz was born in Pittsfield, Massachusetts in 1969. He grew up in Liverpool, New York and began skating at the age of five. He attended Liverpool High School in New York, and was one of the best skaters in the Central New York area. Tretowicz made the US national junior team at the age of 16, and a year later, he was selected to the national team. He then went to Clarkson University, and was named to the ECAC all-rookie team in the 1987/88 season. This was followed by him being drafted by the Calgary Flames in the National Hockey League.

In 1991, Tretowicz was part of the US national team that played at the Men's Ice Hockey World Championships. Tretowicz was part of the American team that took part in the men's tournament at the 1992 Winter Olympics in Albertville, France. He also played in the International Hockey League for the Phoenix Roadrunners and the Fort Wayne Komets in the early 1990s.

After his playing career, Tretowicz worked for the Crouse-Hinds Company. In 2019, he was inducted into the NYS High School Hockey Association Hall of Fame. Tretowicz was also the first hockey player to be inducted into the Greater Syracuse Sports Hall of Fame. His son, Adam, also plays ice hockey.

== Career statistics ==
=== Regular season and playoffs ===
			Regular season					Playoffs
Season	Team	League	GP	G	A	Pts	PIM	GP	G	A	Pts	PIM
1986–87	Northwood School	HS-Prep	—	—	—	—	—	—	—	—	—	—
1987–88	Clarkson University	ECAC	35	8	14	22	28	—	—	—	—	—
1988–89	Clarkson University	ECAC	32	6	17	23	22	—	—	—	—	—
1989–90	Clarkson University	ECAC	35	2	27	29	12	—	—	—	—	—
1990–91	Clarkson University	ECAC	40	4	32	36	18	—	—	—	—	—
1991–92	Phoenix Roadrunners	IHL	16	3	2	5	14	—	—	—	—	—
1992–93	Phoenix Roadrunners	IHL	79	1	15	16	22	—	—	—	—	—
1993–94	Fort Wayne Komets	IHL	72	3	12	15	30	16	1	0	1	4
IHL totals			167	7	29	36	66	16	1	0	1	4

=== International ===
Year	Team	Event	GP	G	A	Pts	PIM
1991	United States	WC	10	0	3	3	4
1992	United States	OG	8	0	0	0	0
Senior totals			18	0	3	3	4
