= Dan Murphy (ice hockey) =

Professional ice hockey player

- Born: May 6, 1976 (age 50) Nanaimo, British Columbia, Canada
- Height: 6 ft 2 in (188 cm)
- Weight: 190 lb (86 kg; 13 st 8 lb)
- Position: Goaltender
- Caught: Left
- Played for: Worcester IceCats; Peoria Rivermen; Quebec Citadelles; Philadelphia Phantoms; Springfield Falcons; Trenton Titans; Milwaukee Admirals; Lexington Men O' War; Alaska Aces; Fort Worth Brahmas
- Playing career: 1993–2005

Daniel Murphy (born May 6, 1976) is a Canadian retired ice hockey goaltender who was a two-time All-American for Clarkson.

== Career ==
Murphy began attending Clarkson University in 1994 after a three-year stint with his home-town junior team, the Nanaimo Clippers. Murphy became the first freshman goaltender to start for the Golden Knights since 1972. Dan helped the team win the ECAC Hockey regular season title. His numbers improved greatly as a sophomore and he finished in the top 10 in the nation with a 2.70 goals against average. Dan was named an All American after his sophomore season and he earned a spot on the All-American Second Team. Clarkson University made its second consecutive NCAA appearance with Murphy as their goaltender and lost a closely-fought game against top-seeded Boston University. Murphy improved again as a junior, winning 27 games and leading Clarkson to another league championship. While the team fell in the ECAC championship game, Clarkson received the top eastern seed and was expected to make a run for the NCAA Championship. For his senior season, Murphy played in 23 games and had a record of 10–9–2. Murphy finished his college career as Clarkson's All-Time Wins Leader. Clarkson finished second in the ECAC and made their fourth consecutive NCAA appearance. They were set against CC in the First Round bout couldn't exact their revenge, losing 3–1. Murphy became the ECAC All Time Wins leader with 85 wins, a record that stands to this day.

After graduating, Murphy began his professional career signing with the St Louis Blues (NHL) and split the season between the Peoria Rivermen (ECHL) and the Worcester Ice Cats (AHL). His second pro season he signed a 1-year deal with the Montreal Canadiens (NHL) and found himself with the Quebec Citadelles. Murphy was an AHL All-Star that year. Murphy was traded at the deadline to the Philadelphia Flyers (NHL) and signed a 3-year deal with Philadelphia. During his time with the Flyers Dan would play for the Philadelphia Phantoms (AHL), the Springfield Falcons (AHL) and Trenton Tians (ECHL) Upon completion of his contract he signed with the Lexington Men’O’War (ECHL) and then the Alaska Aces (ECHL). Dan's final season was with the Fort Worth Brahmas (CHL). His season was cut short due to a career ending back injury which caused him to retire. He finished his 7-year professional career with Fort Worth.

== Statistics ==
=== Regular season and playoffs ===
			Regular season									Playoffs
Season	Team	League	GP	W	L	T	MIN	GA	SO	GAA	SV%	GP	W	L	MIN	GA	SO	GAA	SV%
1991–92	Nanaimo Clippers	BCJHL	19	8	6	0	919	79	0	5.16	.832	1	0	0	26	2	0	4.65	0.833
1992–93	Nanaimo Clippers	BCJHL	42	14	20	0	2224	199	1	5.36	.856	7	3	4	426	28	0	3.92	0.906
1993–94	Nanaimo Clippers	BCJHL	52	18	30	0	2846	252	0	5.31	.881	5	1	4	300	25	0	5.00	0.867
1994–95	Clarkson University	ECAC	37	23	9	4	2157	118	0	3.28	.889	—	—	—	—	—	—	—	—
1995–96	Clarkson University	ECAC	38	25	10	3	2224	100	1	2.70	.912	—	—	—	—	—	—	—	—
1996–97	Clarkson University	ECAC	37	27	10	0	2162	84	3	2.33	.917	—	—	—	—	—	—	—	—
1997–98	Clarkson University	ECAC	23	10	9	2	1266	48	2	2.27	.907	—	—	—	—	—	—	—	—
1998–99	Worcester IceCats	AHL	8	2	4	1	410	26	0	3.81	.846	—	—	—	—	—	—	—	—
1998–99	Peoria Rivermen	ECHL	29	16	10	2	1672	92	1	3.30	.902	3	1	2	180	11	0	3.67	0.888
1999–00	Quebec Citadelles	AHL	33	16	9	1	1573	62	3	2.37	.924	—	—	—	—	—	—	—	—
1999–00	Philadelphia Phantoms	AHL	5	1	4	0	258	17	0	3.95	.864	—	—	—	—	—	—	—	—
2000–01	Philadelphia Phantoms	AHL	2	0	2	0	80	9	0	6.75	.795	—	—	—	—	—	—	—	—
2000–01	Springfield Falcons	AHL	16	4	7	2	824	51	0	3.71	.875	—	—	—	—	—	—	—	—
2000–01	Trenton Titans	ECHL	15	7	7	1	862	33	2	2.30	.925	3	1	0	156	8	0	3.08	0.895
2001–02	Philadelphia Phantoms	AHL	4	2	1	0	208	12	0	3.46	.915	—	—	—	—	—	—	—	—
2001–02	Trenton Titans	ECHL	45	30	10	4	2662	94	3	2.12	.921	7	3	4	422	18	0	2.56	0.908
2002–03	Milwaukee Admirals	AHL	1	0	1	0	60	4	0	4.00	.862	—	—	—	—	—	—	—	—
2002–03	Lexington Men O' War	ECHL	43	21	19	3	2591	123	2	2.85	.907	2	0	2	85	8	0	5.64	0.867
2003–04	Alaska Aces	ECHL	51	27	20	3	3015	138	1	2.75	.898	7	3	4	435	19	1	2.62	0.914
2004–05	Fort Worth Brahmas	CHL	38	18	14	4	2136	99	2	2.78	.900	—	—	—	—	—	—	—	—
BCJHL totals			113	40	56	0	5,989	530	1	5.31	.867	13	4	8	752	55	0	4.38	0.890
NCAA totals			135	85	37	9	7,809	350	6	2.69	.906	—	—	—	—	—	—	—	—
ECHL totals			183	101	66	13	12,178	480	9	2.66	.908	24	9	11	1279	64	1	2.98	0.902
AHL totals			69	25	28	4	3,413	181	3	3.15	.896	—	—	—	—	—	—	—	—
CHL totals			38	18	14	4	2,136	99	2	2.78	.900	—	—	—	—	—	—	—	—

== Awards and honors ==
Award	Year	-	AHL-American Hockey League All Star 2000-2001	1997-98
All-ECAC Hockey All Time Wins Leader	1997-98			
All-ECHL Hockey All Star	2001-2002			
All-ECAC Hockey Rookie Team	1994–95			
AHCA East Second-Team All-American	1995–96			
All-ECAC Hockey Second Team	1996–97			
AHCA East Second-Team All-American	1996–97			
