= Steve Cruickshank =

Canadian ice hockey player

- Born: September 30, 1959 (age 67) Toronto, Ontario, Canada
- Height: 5 ft 8 in (173 cm)
- Weight: 168 lb (76 kg; 12 st 0 lb)
- Position: Center
- Shot: Left
- Played for: Clarkson
- Playing career: 1978–1982

Steve Cruickshank (born September 30, 1959) is a Canadian retired ice hockey center who was an All-American for Clarkson.

== Career ==
Cruickshank was a member of the final recruiting class at Clarkson for Jerry York. In his freshman season, Cruickshank posted decent numbers and the team finished 5th in the conference standings but it was when Bill O'Flaherty took over as coach in 1979 that he Cruickshank made a name for himself. In 1980 he nearly doubled his goal production and was named to the All-conference second team. Clarkson won its first playoff game in three years and tings only got better from there. Cruickshank nearly hit the 30-goal mark as a junior and was again an ECAC Hockey all-star while the team finished atop the conference and made their first NCAA tournament appearance in eleven years.

As a senior, Cruickshank was a greater part of the offense and led the team in scoring as it had another first-place finish. Cruickshank was an All-American and awarded the ECAC Hockey Player of the Year but, unfortunately, wasn't able to get the Golden Knights out of they playoff rut. The team won one of five postseason games that year and fell to eventual champion North Dakota in the NCAA tournament. Cruickshank retired from playing on graduation and was later named to the ECAC all-decade team.

== Statistics ==
=== Regular season and playoffs ===
| | | | Regular Season | | | | | Playoffs |
| Season | Team | League | GP | G | A | Pts | PIM | GP | G | A | Pts | PIM |
|---|---|---|---|---|---|---|---|---|---|---|---|---|
| 1978–79 | Clarkson | ECAC Hockey | 30 | 12 | 20 | 32 | 10 | — | — | — | — | — |
| 1979–80 | Clarkson | ECAC Hockey | 29 | 21 | 26 | 47 | 28 | — | — | — | — | — |
| 1980–81 | Clarkson | ECAC Hockey | 37 | 29 | 25 | 54 | 60 | — | — | — | — | — |
| 1981–82 | Clarkson | ECAC Hockey | 33 | 25 | 32 | 57 | 47 | — | — | — | — | — |
| NCAA totals | | | 129 | 87 | 103 | 190 | 145 | — | — | — | — | — |

== Awards and honors ==
| Award | Year |
|---|---|
| All-ECAC Hockey Second Team | 1979–80 |
| All-ECAC Hockey Second Team | 1980–81 |
| All-ECAC Hockey First Team | 1981–82 |
| AHCA East All-American | 1981–82 |

Awards and achievements
| Preceded by Ed Small | ECAC Hockey Player of the Year; 1981–82 | Succeeded by Randy Velischek |
