= John Fletcher (ice hockey) =

American ice hockey player (born 1967)

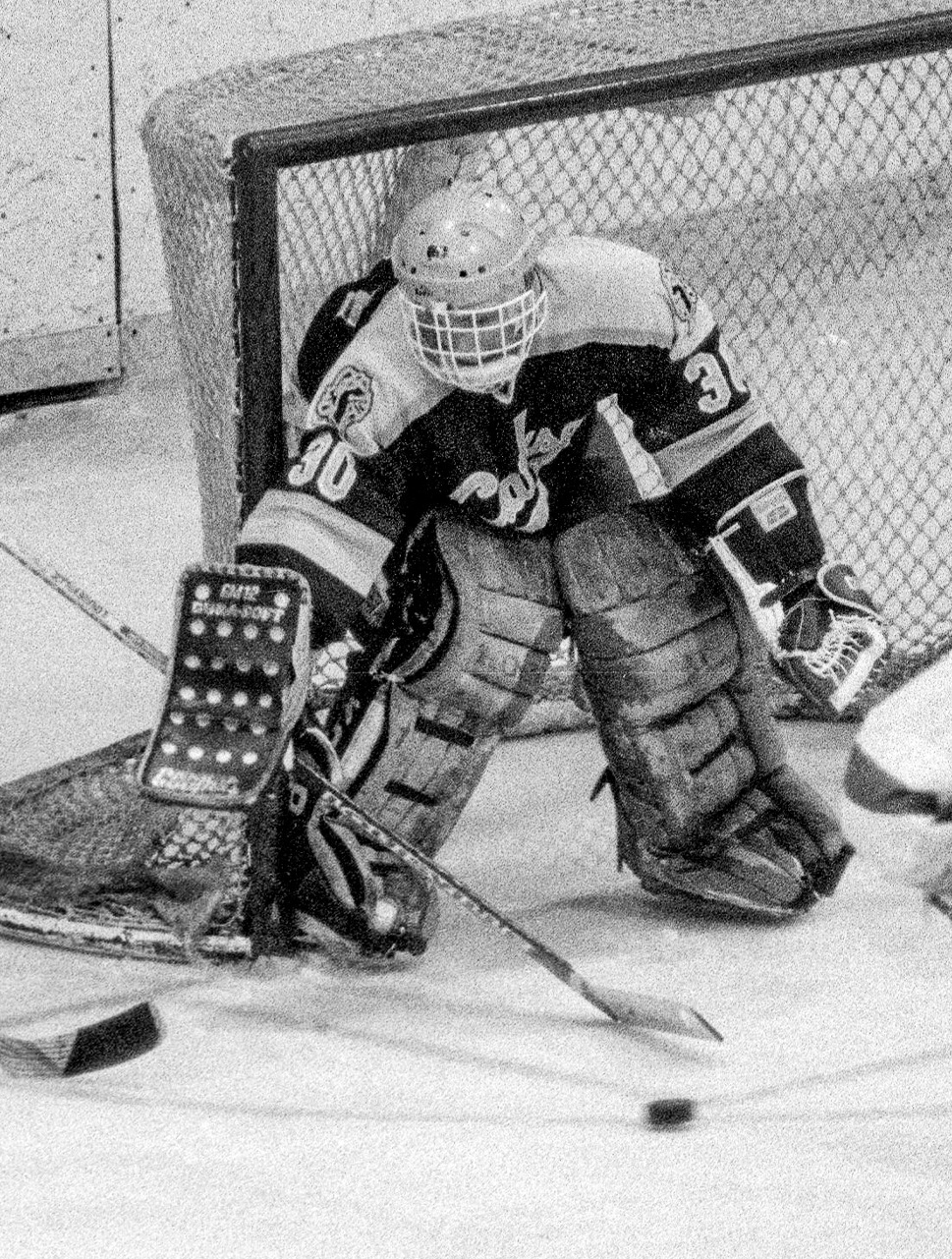
- Fletcher at Clarkson in 1987
- Born: October 14, 1967 (age 59) Newton, Massachusetts, USA
- Height: 5 ft 11 in (180 cm)
- Weight: 170 lb (77 kg; 12 st 2 lb)
- Position: Goaltender
- Caught: Left
- Played for: Clarkson; Winston-Salem Thunderbirds; Cincinnati Cyclones; Nashville Knights; Knoxville Cherokees; Johnstown Chiefs
- NHL draft: 192nd, 1987; Vancouver Canucks
- Playing career: 1986–1992
- Coaching career

Biographical details
- Education: Clarkson

Coaching career (HC unless noted)
- 1994–1996: Dartmouth (assistant)
- 1996–1997: Bowling Green (assistant)
- 1999–2002: Nebraska–Omaha (assistant)

John Fletcher is an American former ice hockey goaltender and coach who was an All-American for Clarkson.

== Career ==
Fletcher was an instant hit for Clarkson, taking over the starting role as a freshman. He recorded 4 shutouts and was named ECAC Hockey Rookie of the Year. The team in front of him was average at best and finished in the middle of the conference, losing in the first round of the ECAC Tournament, but that didn't stop Fletcher from being drafted by the Vancouver Canucks after the season. Fletcher was just as good the following year and was named an All-American. He backstopped the Golden Knights to an upset win over top-seeded Harvard in the conference semifinals and was named as the top goalie of the tournament.

After new head coach Mark Morris arrived in 1988, Fletcher saw his numbers worsen and his time in goal was reduced. Despite this, Clarkson finished 4th in the conference, their best result to date with Fletcher. Unfortunately, the team couldn't use home ice to its advantage and lost in the first round. Fletcher rebounded as a senior and won 20 games, getting the Golden Knights into the NCAA Tournament for the first time in six years. Clarkson was easily dispatched by Minnesota and Fletcher's college career came to a close.

After graduating, Fletcher played two seasons of professional hockey but he found little success. He played exclusively at the ECHL level and ended up with 5 different teams in that span. He finally began to produce good numbers in his last stop with the Johnstown Chiefs, but it wasn't enough to keep him in the game and he retired in 1992.

Fletcher tried his hand at coaching next, serving as an assistant at several colleges over an 8-year span. In his final stop with Nebraska–Omaha, Fletcher also worked as an HVAC Comfort Advisor. He retired from coaching in 2002 and became a sales manager, working for several companies over the next 15 years. In 2018, Fletcher became a sales director for EyeGuide, a position he holds as of 2021.

== Statistics ==
=== Regular season and playoffs ===
			Regular season									Playoffs
Season	Team	League	GP	W	L	T	MIN	GA	SO	GAA	SV%	GP	W	L	MIN	GA	SO	GAA	SV%
1986–87	Clarkson	ECAC Hockey	23	11	8	1	1240	62	4	3.00	.907	—	—	—	—	—	—	—	—
1987–88	Clarkson	ECAC Hockey	33	16	11	3	1820	97	1	3.20	.908	—	—	—	—	—	—	—	—
1988–89	Clarkson	ECAC Hockey	23	9	8	2	1147	79	0	4.14	.886	—	—	—	—	—	—	—	—
1989–90	Clarkson	ECAC Hockey	34	20	11	3	1900	99	0	3.13	.907	—	—	—	—	—	—	—	—
1990–91	Winston-Salem Thunderbirds	ECHL	11	0	8	0	534	57	0	6.40	.858	—	—	—	—	—	—	—	—
1990–91	Cincinnati Cyclones	ECHL	14	3	8	1	783	71	0	5.44	.844	—	—	—	—	—	—	—	—
1991–92	Nashville Knights	ECHL	11	3	7	1	583	54	0	5.56	.872	—	—	—	—	—	—	—	—
1991–92	Knoxville Cherokees	ECHL	2	0	1	0	79	10	0	7.59	.756	—	—	—	—	—	—	—	—
1991–92	Johnstown Chiefs	ECHL	6	3	2	0	318	13	0	2.45	.924	—	—	—	—	—	—	—	—
NCAA totals			113	56	38	9	6107	337	5	3.31	.904	—	—	—	—	—	—	—	—
ECHL totals			44	9	26	2	2297	205	0	5.35	.863	—	—	—	—	—	—	—	—

== Awards and honors ==
Award	Year
All-ECAC Hockey First Team	1987–88
AHCA East Second-Team All-American	1987–88
ECAC Hockey All-Tournament Team	1988

Awards and achievements
Preceded by John Messuri	ECAC Hockey Rookie of the Year; 1986–87	Succeeded by Trent Andison
