= 1993 ECAC Hockey men's ice hockey tournament =

1993 ECAC Men's ice hockey tournament
- Dates: March 9–20, 1993
- Teams: 10
- Finals site: Olympic Arena; Lake Placid, New York
- Champions: Clarkson (3rd title)
- Winning coach: Mark Morris (2nd title)
- MVP: Chris Rogles (Clarkson)
- ECAC Men's Ice Hockey Tournaments

The 1993 ECAC Hockey Men's Ice Hockey Tournament was the 32nd tournament in league history. It was played between March 9 and March 20, 1993. Preliminary and quarterfinal games were played at home team campus sites, while the 'final four' games were, for the first time, played at the Olympic Arena (subsequently renamed Herb Brooks Arena) in Lake Placid, New York. The third place game was brought back after a three-year hiatus. By winning the tournament, Clarkson received the ECAC's automatic bid to the 1993 NCAA Division I Men's Ice Hockey Tournament.

== Format ==
The tournament featured four rounds of play. The two teams that finish below tenth place in the standings are not eligible for tournament play. In the preliminary round, the seventh and tenth seeds and the eighth and ninth seeds each play a single game to determine the final qualifying teams for the quarterfinals. In the quarterfinals the first seed and lower ranked qualifier, the second and higher ranked qualifier, the third seed and sixth seed and the fourth seed and fifth seed played a modified best-of-three series, where the first team to receive 3 points moves on. After the opening round every series becomes a single-elimination game. In the semifinals, the highest seed plays the lowest remaining seed while the two remaining teams play with the winners advancing to the championship game and the losers advancing to the third place game. The tournament champion receives an automatic bid to the 1993 NCAA Division I Men's Ice Hockey Tournament.

== Conference standings ==
Note: GP = Games played; W = Wins; L = Losses; T = Ties; PTS = Points; GF = Goals For; GA = Goals Against

1992–93 ECAC Hockey standings
	Conference							Overall					
	GP	W	L	T	PTS	GF	GA	GP	W	L	T	GF	GA
Harvard†	22	16	3	3	35	95	61	31	22	6	3	137	85
Rensselaer	22	15	6	1	31	96	61	35	20	11	4	145	108
Clarkson*	22	12	6	4	28	103	64	35	20	10	5	157	95
Brown	22	13	7	2	28	102	78	31	16	12	3	134	123
Yale	22	12	7	3	27	97	86	31	15	12	4	132	122
St. Lawrence	22	12	8	2	26	89	77	32	17	12	3	133	114
Vermont	22	10	11	1	21	71	68	31	12	16	3	95	102
Dartmouth	22	9	13	0	18	82	96	27	11	16	0	98	121
Colgate	22	9	13	0	18	81	101	34	13	18	3	135	146
Princeton	22	6	13	3	15	70	98	29	9	17	3	90	124
Cornell	22	5	16	1	11	61	94	26	6	19	1	75	114
Union	22	3	19	0	6	44	107	25	3	22	0	53	120
Championship: Clarkson † indicates conference regular season champion * indicates conference tournament champion (Whitelaw Cup)

== Bracket ==
Teams are reseeded after the first two rounds

Preliminary Round; March 9
7	Vermont	1
10	Princeton	3
8	Dartmouth	3
9	Colgate	4**

Quarterfinals; March 12–14
1	Harvard	6	8	—
10	Princeton	2	0	—
2	Rensselaer	2	5	5
9	Colgate	5	4	1
3	Clarkson	3	5	—
6	St. Lawrence	1	3	—
4	Brown	3*	5	—
5	Yale	3	3	—

Semifinals; March 19
1	Harvard	1
4	Brown	3
2	Rensselaer	3
3	Clarkson	5

Championship; March 20
3	Clarkson	3
4	Brown	1
Third Place
1	Harvard	6
2	Rensselaer	3

Note: * denotes overtime period(s)

=== Preliminary round ===
==== (7) Vermont vs. (10) Princeton ====
March 9	Vermont	1 – 3	Princeton	Gutterson Fieldhouse

==== (8) Dartmouth vs. (9) Colgate ====
March 9	Dartmouth	3 – 4	2OT	Colgate	Thompson Arena

=== Quarterfinals ===
==== (1) Harvard vs. (10) Princeton ====
March 12	Harvard	6 – 2	Princeton	Bright Hockey Center

March 13	Harvard	8 – 0	Princeton	Bright Hockey Center

Harvard won series 2–0

==== (2) Rensselaer vs. (9) Colgate ====
March 12	Rensselaer	2 – 5	Colgate	Houston Field House

March 13	Rensselaer	5 – 4	Colgate	Houston Field House

March 14	Rensselaer	5 – 1	Colgate	Houston Field House

Rensselaer won series 2–1

==== (3) Clarkson vs. (6) St. Lawrence ====
March 12	Clarkson	3 – 1	St. Lawrence	Cheel Arena

March 13	Clarkson	5 – 3	St. Lawrence	Cheel Arena

Clarkson won series 2–0

==== (4) Brown vs. (5) Yale ====
March 12	Brown	3 – 3	OT	Yale	Meehan Auditorium

March 13	Brown	5 – 3	Yale	Meehan Auditorium

Brown won series 1–0–1

=== Semifinals ===
==== (1) Harvard vs. (4) Brown ====
March 19	Harvard	1 – 3	Brown	Olympic Arena

==== (2) Rensselaer vs. (3) Clarkson ====
March 19	Rensselaer	3 – 5	Clarkson	Olympic Arena

=== Third place ===
==== (1) Harvard vs. (2) Rensselaer ====
March 20	Harvard	6 – 3	Rensselaer	Olympic Arena

=== Championship ===
==== (3) Clarkson vs. (4) Brown ====
March 20	Clarkson	3 – 1	Brown	Olympic Arena

== Tournament awards ==
=== All-Tournament Team ===
- F Todd Marchant (Clarkson)
- F Matt Mallgrave (Harvard)
- F Chris Kaban (Brown)
- D Guy Sanderson (Clarkson)
- D Jamie O'Brien (Brown)
- G Chris Rogles* (Clarkson)

* Most Outstanding Player(s)
