= Hugo Bélanger =

Canadian ice hockey player

- Born: May 28, 1970 (age 56) Saint-Hubert, PQ, CAN
- Height: 6 ft 0 in (183 cm)
- Weight: 190 lb (86 kg; 13 st 8 lb)
- Position: Left wing
- Shot: Left
- Played for: IHL; Indianapolis Ice; Atlanta Knights; Phoenix Roadrunners; Fort Wayne Komets; ECHL; Nashville Knights; Pensacola Ice Pilots; WCHL; Phoenix Mustangs; UHL; Adirondack IceHawks; LNAH; Sorel Mission
- NHL draft: 163rd overall, 1990; Chicago Blackhawks
- Playing career: 1993–2008

Hugo P. Bélanger (born May 28, 1970) is a Canadian retired professional ice hockey left wing. Hugo Bélanger was selected in the 8th round (163rd overall) in the 1990 NHL entry draft by the Chicago Blackhawks and went on to play 15 seasons in hockey’s minor leagues.

Bélanger was named the Sher-Wood Most Valuable Player in the UHL four times in his UHL career, as well as the MVP of the ECHL in 1996 and the MVP of the WCHL as a member of the Phoenix Mustangs. Bélanger played a total of 1011 games in his minor league hockey career, totalling 1465 points (518 goals and 947 assists). That point total is the most scored by any player since 1980 and the fifth highest total of all-time.

Belanger also played four seasons of major league roller hockey in both the RHI (with the Long Island Jawz and Anaheim Bullfrogs) and the MLRH (with the Virginia Vultures). While playing for the Vultures, Belanger won the MLRH scoring title by 52 points (79-79-158, 20 GP), including scoring a league record 11 goals and 15 assists in one game. Belanger was named the RHI MVP in 1996, after becoming the only player in RHI history to record a 100-point season. As a member of Team Canada, Belanger earned a gold medal in the 1998 IIHF InLine Hockey World Championship.

Belanger was inducted into the Adirondack Hockey Hall of Fame on Saturday, March 12, 2011 along with Barry Melrose and Jody Gage.

== College career ==
Belanger played four years for the Clarkson Golden Knights in the ECAC (NCAA Division I), posting 205 points (81 goals, 124 assists) in 139 games. Belanger ranks as the third all-time scorer in Clarkson history.

== Career statistics ==
			Regular season					Playoffs
Season	Team	League	GP	G	A	Pts	PIM	GP	G	A	Pts	PIM
1986–87	Richelieu Riverains	QMAAA	39	35	64	99	4	9	8	7	15	0
1988–89	Longueuil Collège Français	QPJHL	—	40	72	112	—	—	—	—	—	—
1989–90	Clarkson University	NCAA	35	14	25	39	12	—	—	—	—	—
1990–91	Clarkson University	NCAA	40	32	43	75	18	—	—	—	—	—
1991–92	Clarkson University	NCAA	33	18	33	51	26	—	—	—	—	—
1992–93	Clarkson University	NCAA	31	17	23	40	36	—	—	—	—	—
1993–94	Indianapolis Ice	IHL	75	23	15	38	8	—	—	—	—	—
1994–95	Indianapolis Ice	IHL	66	20	25	45	8	—	—	—	—	—
1995–96	Atlanta Knights	IHL	4	0	0	0	4	—	—	—	—	—
1995–96	Nashville Knights	ECHL	67	54	90	144	49	5	3	4	7	2
1996–97	EV Duisburg	Germany2	5	2	5	7	2	—	—	—	—	—
1996–97	Phoenix Roadrunners	IHL	3	0	0	0	0	—	—	—	—	—
1996–97	Pensacola Ice Pilots	ECHL	53	22	40	62	14	12	6	9	15	0
1997–98	Phoenix Mustangs	WCHL	63	40	79	119	22	9	6	8	14	2
1998–99	Phoenix Mustangs	WCHL	61	51	61	112	22	3	2	1	3	0
1998–99	Fort Wayne Komets	IHL	6	0	2	2	0	—	—	—	—	—
1999–00	Phoenix Mustangs	WCHL	68	44	74	118	8	12	5	9	14	4
2000–01	Adirondack IceHawks	UHL	73	47	78	125	59	5	4	1	5	0
2001–02	Adirondack IceHawks	UHL	74	33	77	110	29	5	2	6	8	0
2002–03	Adirondack IceHawks	UHL	76	42	101	143	16	4	3	1	4	2
2003–04	Adirondack IceHawks	UHL	75	34	69	103	10	—	—	—	—	—
2004–05	Adirondack Frostbite	UHL	79	34	72	106	14	6	2	4	6	2
2005–06	Adirondack Frostbite	UHL	71	31	67	98	14	6	3	7	10	2
2006–07	Sorel-Tracy Mission	LNAH	47	22	47	69	6	—	—	—	—	—
2007–08	Sorel-Tracy Mission	LNAH	50	21	52	73	10	—	—	—	—	—
ECHL totals			120	76	130	206	63	17	9	13	22	2

== Awards and honours ==
Award	Year
All-ECAC Hockey Rookie Team	1989–90
ECAC Hockey All-Tournament Team	1991
All-ECAC Hockey Second team	1991–92

Awards and achievements
Preceded by Craig Woodcroft	ECAC Hockey Most Outstanding Player in Tournament; 1991	Succeeded by Daniel Laperrière
