= Bill Blackwood =

Canadian ice hockey player

- Born: April 5, 1955 (age 71) Sudbury, Ontario, Canada
- Height: 5 ft 11 in (180 cm)
- Weight: 190 lb (86 kg; 13 st 8 lb)
- Position: Defence
- Shot: Left
- Played for: WHA; Indianapolis Racers; IHL; Fort Wayne Komets
- NHL draft: Undrafted
- Playing career: 1978–1980

Bill Blackwood (born April 5, 1955) is a Canadian former professional ice hockey defenceman.

During the 1977–78 season, Blackwood played three games in the World Hockey Association with the Indianapolis Racers.

== Awards and honors ==
Award	Year
All-ECAC Hockey Second Team	1975–76
All-ECAC Hockey Second Team	1976–77
AHCA East All-American	1976–77
All-ECAC Hockey Second Team	1977–78
AHCA East All-American	1977–78

== Career statistics ==
=== Regular season and playoffs ===
			Regular season					Playoffs
Season	Team	League	GP	G	A	Pts	PIM	GP	G	A	Pts	PIM
1974-75	Clarkson University	ECAC	29	6	11	17	22	—	—	—	—	—
1975–76	Clarkson University	ECAC	31	20	22	42	75	—	—	—	—	—
1976–77	Clarkson University	ECAC	34	17	54	71	91	—	—	—	—	—
1977–78	Clarkson University	ECAC	29	9	30	39	49	—	—	—	—	—
1977–78	Indianapolis Racers	WHA	3	0	0	0	0	—	—	—	—	—
1978–79	Fort Wayne Komets	IHL	76	10	39	49	70	13	5	10	15	15
1979–80	Fort Wayne Komets	IHL	76	14	41	55	57	15	6	8	14	4
WHA totals			3	0	0	0	0	—	—	—	—	—
