= Bill Harrison (ice hockey) =

American ice hockey coach

William Harrison
Biographical details
- Born: Walpole, Massachusetts, U.S.

Playing career
- 1941–1943: Dartmouth

Coaching career (HC unless noted)
- 1948–1958: Clarkson

Head coaching record
- Overall: 127-47-6 .722

Accomplishments and honors

Championships
- 1951 Tri-State League Champion; 1956 Tri-State League Champion; 1958 Tri-State League Champion

Awards
- 1956 Spencer Penrose Award; 2008 Clarkson Athletic Hall of Fame

Records
- Highest winning percentage one season: (1.000)

William Harrison was an American ice hockey coach. He was the head coach of Clarkson for a decade after World War II and provided the team with their only undefeated season.

== Career ==
After graduating from Dartmouth in 1943 William Harrison signed up with the Marines at the height of the second world war. Harrison left after three years of service and returned to Walpole, Massachusetts to coach at the local high school before accepting a position to become a professor of civil engineering at Clarkson and coach the ice hockey team.

Harrison Coached at Clarkson for 10 seasons, winning 3 league titles (after the Golden Knights founded the Tri-State League), making 2 Frozen Four appearances and providing Clarkson with an undefeated season in 1955–56 season. Because the '56 team had eight seniors that were 4-year varsity players (they would have been ineligible to participate in the 1956 NCAA tournament) the team as a whole voted to decline the invitation to play. Harrison received the 1956 Spencer Penrose Award despite the eligibility conflict and resigned as head coach two years later.

Harrison continued on in an academic capacity with Clarkson, receiving a fellowship from the National Science Foundation in 1959. He was inducted into Clarkson's Athletic Hall of Fame in 2008.

== Head coaching record ==
Record table
Season	Team	Overall	Conference	Standing	Postseason
Clarkson Golden Knights Independent (1948–1950)
1948-49	Clarkson	8-5-0			
1949-50	Clarkson	4-8-2			
Clarkson:		12-13-2			
Clarkson Golden Knights (Tri-State League) (1950–1958)
1950-51	Clarkson	12-2-1	4-1-0	1st	Tri-State League Tie-Breaker (Win)
1951-52	Clarkson	10-5-0	3-3-0	3rd	
1952-53	Clarkson	9-9-1	1-3-1	4th	
1953-54	Clarkson	7-8-2	1-4-0	3rd	
1954-55	Clarkson	18-4-0	4-2-0	2nd	
1955-56	Clarkson	23-0-0	6-0-0	1st	
1956-57	Clarkson	19-3-0	4-2-0	2nd	NCAA Consolation Game (Win)
1957-58	Clarkson	17-3-0	5-0-0	1st	NCAA Consolation Game (Win)
Clarkson:		115-34-4	28-15-1		
Total:		127-47-6			
National champion Postseason invitational champion Conference regular season champion Conference regular season and conference tournament champion Division regular season champion Division regular season and conference tournament champion Conference tournament champion

Awards and achievements
Preceded by Cooney Weiland	Spencer Penrose Award; 1955–56	Succeeded by Jack Riley
