= 1954–55 Michigan Wolverines men's ice hockey season =

Sports season

National champion 1955 NCAA tournament, champion
- Conference: 2nd WIHL
- Home ice: Michigan Coliseum

Record
- Overall: 18–5–1
- Home: 10–1–1
- Road: 6–4
- Neutral: 2–0

Coaches and captains
- Head coach: Vic Heyliger
- Captain: Bill MacFarland

The 1954–55 Michigan Wolverines men's ice hockey team represented the University of Michigan in college ice hockey. In its 11th year under head coach Vic Heyliger, the team compiled an 18–5–1 record, outscored opponents 107 to 70, and won the 1955 NCAA men's ice hockey tournament. The 1955 championship was Michigan's fifth NCAA hockey championship in eight years.

During the regular season, the Wolverines finished in second place in the Western Intercollegiate Hockey League (WIHL) with a 13-5-0 record against conference opponents.

Team captain Bill MacFarland was the leading scorer with 56 points on 33 goals and 23 assists. For the second time in program history, six Michigan players were selected as first-team All-Americans. The All-American selections were defensemen Mike Buchanan and Bob Schiller, goalie Lorne Howes, and forwards MacFarland, Dick Dunnigan, and Tom Rendall. Howes, MacFarland, and Rendall were also named to the NCAA Frozen Four All Tournament First Team.

== Season ==
Michigan was coming off of their seventh consecutive trip to the NCAA tournament but after losing what the team deemed to be inferior opponent the Wolverines saw their championship run end in the semifinal. Head Coach Had the Maize and Blue raring to go against McGill for their home opener, winning 7–2 but the team appeared to slip a bit after that. They finished their non-conference schedule 3–0–1 but when they headed to Colorado to face the Tigers and the Pioneers they came home with only 1 win in four games. After taking both games against hated rival Michigan State in a home-and-home series they split two consecutive weeks against Minnesota and Michigan Tech.

With more than half of their season over the Wolverines were at risk of missing the tournament for the first time with only a middling 5–5 record in the WIHL. Beginning with their second series against the Spartans in mid-February Michigan began showing the mettle that earned them four national titles in six years. The defense buckled down while the Wolverine attack seemed to score at will, winning eight straight games while averaging almost six goals per game. The winning streak allowed Michigan to separate themselves away from the rest of their competition and join Colorado College comfortably at the top of the conference. With a second-place finish in the WIHL Michigan received the #2 western seed and they headed back to Colorado Springs.

The Wolverines began the 1955 championship against Harvard who were led by the nation's leading scorer in Bill Cleary (who averaged more than 4 points per game by himself). The Crimson offense was stymied by the Wolverines who continued to rack up the goals and take the semifinal 7–3. Two days later the Wolverines were again facing Colorado College in what amounted to a road game though this time the winner would skate away with the national championship.

Tom Rendall opened the scoring less than three minutes into the game and after exchanging the lead the Wolverines ended the first up 2–1. The CC offense started to ratchet itself up in the second, outshooting Michigan 15–6 but the second frame ended with the same score as the first. The Tigers increased their pace even more in the third but it was Michigan's Jay Gould who found the net first, increasing the Wolverine lead to 3–1. Colorado College did close the gap back to a single goal but less than a minute later Michigan restored their two-goal advantage. Clare Smith got the Tigers back within one less than three minutes left but Lorne Howes refused to allow any more recording his 47th save of the night before captain Bill MacFarland salted the game away with an empty-net marker at 19:57. Despite the herculean effort by the Wolverines it was Phil Hilton of the opposition who received the Tournament Most Outstanding Player though Howes, MacFarland and Rendall were all named to the All-Tournament First Team.

== Standings ==
1954–55 Western Intercollegiate Hockey League
	Conference								Overall					
	GP	W	L	T	PCT	PTS	GF	GA	GP	W	L	T	GF	GA
Colorado College†	18	14	4	0	.778	19	73	48	28	22	6	0	144	77
Michigan	18	13	5	0	.722	16	78	55	24	18	5	1	107	70
Minnesota	24	10	12	2	.458	11	98	96	30	16	12	2	141	109
Michigan Tech	20	8	11	1	.425	10½	72	68	26	12	13	1	116	86
Denver	18	8	9	1	.472	10½	83	68	30	18	11	1	175	110
North Dakota	22	9	12	1	.432	9½	63	100	28	14	13	1	115	115
Michigan State	20	5	14	1	.275	7½	62	94	27	9	17	1	89	125
† indicates conference regular season champion Note: All games played between league members counted in the standings. When teams played each other twice, two points were awarded for a win, one point for a tie. When teams met each other four times, one point was awarded for a win, one-half point for a tie. Maximum of 24 points available.

== Schedule ==
Date	Opponent^{#}	Rank^{#}	Site	Result	Record
Regular season
December 4	vs. McGill*		Weinberg Coliseum • Ann Arbor, Michigan	W 7–2	1–0–0
December 5	vs. McGill*		Weinberg Coliseum • Ann Arbor, Michigan	W 4–2	2–0–0
December 10	vs. Montreal*		Weinberg Coliseum • Ann Arbor, Michigan	W 3–2	3–0–0
December 11	vs. Montreal*		Weinberg Coliseum • Ann Arbor, Michigan	T 3–3	3–0–1
December 17	at Colorado College		Broadmoor World Arena • Colorado Springs, Colorado	L 0–4	3–1–1 (0–1–0)
December 18	at Colorado College		Broadmoor World Arena • Colorado Springs, Colorado	L 4–5 ^{OT}	3–2–1 (0–2–0)
December 21	at Denver		DU Arena • Denver, Colorado	W 2–1	4–2–1 (1–2–0)
December 22	at Denver		DU Arena • Denver, Colorado	L 2–8	4–3–1 (1–3–0)
January 7	at Michigan State		Demonstration Hall • East Lansing, Michigan	W 7–0	5–3–1 (2–3–0)
January 8	vs. Michigan State		Weinberg Coliseum • Ann Arbor, Michigan	W 3–1	6–3–1 (3–3–0)
January 14	vs. Minnesota		Weinberg Coliseum • Ann Arbor, Michigan	L 4–10	6–4–1 (3–4–0)
January 15	vs. Minnesota		Weinberg Coliseum • Ann Arbor, Michigan	W 5–3	7–4–1 (4–4–0)
February 4	at Michigan Tech		Dee Stadium • Houghton, Michigan	W 4–2	8–4–1 (5–4–0)
February 5	at Michigan Tech		Dee Stadium • Houghton, Michigan	L 4–2	8–5–1 (5–5–0)
February 11	at Michigan State		Demonstration Hall • East Lansing, Michigan	W 7–4	9–5–1 (6–5–0)
February 12	vs. Michigan State		Weinberg Coliseum • Ann Arbor, Michigan	W 4–3	10–5–1 (7–5–0)
February 18	at Minnesota		Williams Arena • Minneapolis	W 5–2	11–5–1 (8–5–0)
February 19	at Minnesota		Williams Arena • Minneapolis	W 3–1	12–5–1 (9–5–0)
February 25	vs. North Dakota		Weinberg Coliseum • Ann Arbor, Michigan	W 7–0	13–5–1 (10–5–0)
February 26	vs. North Dakota		Weinberg Coliseum • Ann Arbor, Michigan	W 7–2	14–5–1 (11–5–0)
March 4	vs. Michigan Tech		Weinberg Coliseum • Ann Arbor, Michigan	W 5–1	15–5–1 (12–5–0)
March 5	vs. Michigan Tech		Weinberg Coliseum • Ann Arbor, Michigan	W 8–4	16–5–1 (13–5–0)
NCAA Tournament
March 10	vs. Harvard*		Broadmoor World Arena • Colorado Springs, Colorado (National Semifinal)	W 7–3	17–5–1 (13–5–0)
March 12	vs. Colorado College*		Broadmoor World Arena • Colorado Springs, Colorado (National championship)	W 5–3	18–5–1 (13–5–0)
*Non-conference game. Source:

== Roster and scoring statistics ==
No.	Name	Year	Position	Hometown	S/P/C	Games	Goals	Assists	Pts	PIM
7	Bill MacFarland	Junior	LW	Toronto	(Ontario)	24	33	23	56	67
12	Tom Rendall	Sophomore	C	Winnipeg, Manitoba	(Manitoba)	18	20	19	39	22
6	Dick Dunnigan	Sophomore	RW	Edmonton, Alberta	(Alberta)	24	15	24	39	8
8	Jerry Karpinka	Sophomore	LW	Edmonton, Alberta	(Alberta)	24	9	16	25	34
9	Jay Gould	Junior	RW	Kirkland Lake, Ontario	(Ontario)	24	14	10	24	28
3	Bob Shiller	Sophomore	D	Riverside, Ontario	(Ontario)	24	4	8	12	54
11	Neil Buchanan	Sophomore	D	Ottawa, ON	(Ontario)	24	4	5	9	48
2	Mike Buchanan	Sophomore	D	Ottawa, ON	(Ontario)	10	3	4	7	17
10	Yves Hebert	Senior	F	Montreal, PQ	(Quebec)	20	3	4	7	4
5	Bob Pitts	Sophomore	D	Castlegar, British Columbia	(British Columbia)	24	2	5	7	24
4	Bernie Hanna	Sophomore	D	Calgary, Alberta	(Alberta)	24	0	2	2	48
15	Baden Cosby	Junior	F	Gravenhurst, Ontario	(Ontario)	14	0	1	1	0
16	Bill Lucier	Senior	G	Windsor, Ontario	(Ontario)	1	0	0	0	0
1	Lorne Howes	Junior	G	Kirkland Lake, Ontario	(Ontario)	24	0	0	0	2
14	Don McIntosh	Freshman	C	Toronto	(Ontario)	–	–	–	–	–
Total										

== 1955 national championship ==
=== Colorado College vs. Michigan ===
March 12	Colorado College	3 – 5	Michigan	Broadmoor Ice Palace

Scoring summary
Period	Team	Goal	Assist(s)	Time	Score
1st	UM	Tom Rendall	unassisted	02:38	1–0 UM
2nd	CC	Phil Hilton	unassisted	22:28	1–1
2nd	UM	Neil Buchanan	M. Buchanan	39:23	2–1 UM
3rd	UM	Jay Gould	unassisted	46:18	3–1 UM
3rd	CC	Don Wishart	Hubchik	47:34	3–2 UM
3rd	UM	Jerry Karpinka – GW	Dunnigan	48:31	4–2 UM
3rd	CC	Clare Smith	Silverberg	57:23	4–3 UM
3rd	UM	Bill MacFarland – EN	unassisted	59:57	5–3 UM

Shots by period
Team	1	2	3	T
Michigan	9	6	11	26
Colorado College	12	15	23	50

Goaltenders
Team	Name	Saves	Goals against	Time on ice
UM	Lorne Howes	47	3	
CC	Jeff Simus	22	4	

== See also ==
- 1955 NCAA men's ice hockey tournament
- List of NCAA Division I men's ice hockey champions
