= 1955–56 Michigan Wolverines men's ice hockey season =

Sports season

National champion WIHL champion NCAA Tournament, champion
- Conference: 1st WIHL
- Home ice: Michigan Coliseum

Record
- Overall: 20–2–1
- Home: 11–1–1
- Road: 7–1
- Neutral: 2–0

Coaches and captains
- Head coach: Vic Heyliger
- Captain: Bill MacFarland

The 1955–56 Michigan Wolverines men's ice hockey team represented the University of Michigan in college ice hockey. In its 12th year under head coach Vic Heyliger, the team compiled a 20–2–1 record, outscored opponents 109 to 49, and won the 1956 NCAA Division I Men's Ice Hockey Tournament. The Wolverines defeated St. Lawrence 2–1 in overtime in the first round of the Frozen Four. They then defeated Michigan Tech by a 7–5 score in the championship game at Broadmoor Arena in Colorado Springs, Colorado. The 1956 championship was Michigan's sixth NCAA hockey championship in nine years.

Goalie Lorne Howes was selected as the team's Most Valuable Player and was also named Most Valuable Player in the 1956 NCAA Tournament. Team captain Bill MacFarland was the team's leading scorer with 19 goals, 28 assists, and 47 total points in 23 games. Howes, MacFarland, and defenseman Bob Schiller were all named to the All-American college hockey team.

== Standings ==
1955–56 Western Intercollegiate Hockey League
	Conference								Overall					
	GP	W	L	T	PCT	PTS	GF	GA	GP	W	L	T	GF	GA
Michigan†	18	15	2	1	.858	19	80	37	23	20	2	1	109	49
Michigan Tech	20	14	6	0	.700	17	82	61	28	21	7	0	156	83
Colorado College	18	10	8	0	.556	14	72	66	28	17	11	0	144	100
Minnesota	22	11	10	1	.523	12	63	60	29	16	12	1	106	80
North Dakota	20	7	13	0	.350	10	67	93	28	11	16	1	100	129
Denver	16	6	8	2	.438	10	58	58	26	12	11	3	130	84
Michigan State	18	1	17	0	.056	2	35	82	23	5	18	0	55	96
† indicates conference regular season champion Note: All games played between league members counted in the standings. When teams played each other twice, two points were awarded for a win, one point for a tie. When teams met each other four times, one point was awarded for a win, one-half point for a tie. Maximum of 24 points available.

== Schedule ==
Conference games against Michigan State, Michigan Tech and Minnesota were only worth 1 point in the standings.

Date	Opponent	Site	Result	Record
Regular season
December 3	vs. McGill*	Weinberg Coliseum • Ann Arbor, Michigan	W 5–3	1–0–0
December 9	at North Dakota	Winter Sports Building • Grand Forks, North Dakota	W 5–1	2–0–0 (1–0–0)
December 10	at North Dakota	Winter Sports Building • Grand Forks, North Dakota	L 2–4	2–1–0 (1–1–0)
December 13	at Denver	Weinberg Coliseum • Ann Arbor, Michigan	T 3–3 ^{OT}	2–1–1 (1–1–1)
December 14	at Denver	Weinberg Coliseum • Ann Arbor, Michigan	W 6–2	3–1–1 (2–1–1)
January 6	at Michigan State	Demonstration Hall • East Lansing, Michigan	W 5–2	4–1–1 (3–1–1)
January 7	vs. Michigan State	Weinberg Coliseum • Ann Arbor, Michigan	W 3–1	5–1–1 (4–1–1)
January 13	vs. Minnesota	Weinberg Coliseum • Ann Arbor, Michigan	W 2–0	6–1–1 (5–1–1)
January 14	vs. Minnesota	Weinberg Coliseum • Ann Arbor, Michigan	W 2–1	7–1–1 (6–1–1)
January 20	at Michigan State	Demonstration Hall • East Lansing, Michigan	W 3–2 ^{OT}	8–1–1 (7–1–1)
January 21	vs. Michigan State	Weinberg Coliseum • Ann Arbor, Michigan	W 7–1	9–1–1 (8–1–1)
February 7	vs. Colorado College	Weinberg Coliseum • Ann Arbor, Michigan	L 3–6	9–2–1 (8–2–1)
February 8	vs. Colorado College	Weinberg Coliseum • Ann Arbor, Michigan	W 7–2	10–2–1 (9–2–1)
February 17	at Minnesota	Williams Arena • Minneapolis, Minnesota	W 5–3	11–2–1 (10–2–1)
February 18	at Minnesota	Williams Arena • Minneapolis, Minnesota	W 6–2	12–2–1 (11–2–1)
February 24	vs. Montreal*	Weinberg Coliseum • Ann Arbor, Michigan	W 5–2	13–2–1 (11–2–1)
February 25	vs. Montreal*	Weinberg Coliseum • Ann Arbor, Michigan	W 10–1	14–2–1 (11–2–1)
March 2	at Michigan Tech	Dee Stadium • Houghton, Michigan	W 5–2	15–2–1 (12–2–1)
March 3	at Michigan Tech	Dee Stadium • Houghton, Michigan	W 6–3	16–2–1 (13–2–1)
March 9	vs. Michigan Tech	Weinberg Coliseum • Ann Arbor, Michigan	W 5–1	17–2–1 (14–2–1)
March 10	vs. Michigan Tech	Weinberg Coliseum • Ann Arbor, Michigan	W 5–1	18–2–1 (15–2–1)
NCAA Tournament
March 16	vs. St. Lawrence*	Broadmoor World Arena • Colorado Springs, Colorado (National semifinal)	W 2–1 ^{OT}	19–2–1 (15–2–1)
March 17	vs. Michigan Tech*	Broadmoor World Arena • Colorado Springs, Colorado (National championship)	W 7–5	20–2–1 (15–2–1)
*Non-conference game. Source:

== Regular season ==
=== McGill: Dec. 3, 1955 ===
On December 3, 1955, the Wolverines opened their season with a 5-3 victory over McGill in front of a sellout crowd of 3,700 at the Coliseum in Ann Arbor. Dick Dunnigan scored two goals for Michigan. Bill MacFarland, Ed Switzer, and Wally Maxwell scored one each. Team captain MacFarland sustained "a severe ankle sprain" after colliding with the boards in the third period. The Michigan Daily praised the play of the newest Wolverine, Wally Maxwell: "His scoring punch and sharp passing should make him one of Michigan's leading offense threats."

=== At North Dakota: December 9–10, 1955 ===
The Wolverines next played a Friday/Saturday series against the North Dakota Fighting Sioux on December 9 and 10, 1955, at Grand Forks, North Dakota. Michigan won the first game, 5-1, before a "violently partisan" crowd of 3,800 at Grand Forks. Michigan's goals were scored by Dick Dunnigan, Ed Switzer, Tom Rendall, Jay Goold, and Wally Maxwell. Goalie Lorne Howes made 23 saves.

The Wolverines lost the second game to North Dakota by a 4-2 score. Michigan goalie Lorne Howes was struck by the puck above his left eye at the start of the third period and sustained a gash. The game was delayed while Howes had the wound stitched. Ed Switzer and Bernie Hanna scored Michigan's goals. South Dakota's final goal came late in the third period after Michigan coach Vic Heyliger pulled the goalie for an extra skater.

=== Denver: December 13 and 14, 1955 ===
The Wolverines returned home for a Tuesday/Wednesday series against the Denver Pioneers on December 13 and 14, 1955. In the Tuesday night game, the teams played to a 3-3 tie before a crowd of 2,500 at the Coliseum in Ann Arbor. Michigan held a 3-1 lead with five minutes left in the game, but the Pioneers scored twice, including a tying goal with 49 second remaining. Neither team scored in the 10-minute overtime period, and the game ended in a tie. Wally Maxwell scored two goals in the game, and Ed Switzer scored one. With the tie, Michigan fell to 1-1-1 in three WIHL games.

Michigan won the Wednesday night game by a 6-2 score in front of a crowd of 2,700 at the Coliseum. Defenseman Bob Pitts was the star of the game with two goals and a strong defensive performance. Team captain Bill MacFarland also scored twice. Michigan's remaining goals were scored by Ed Switzer and Tom Rendall. Denver's second goal came on an errant effort by Michigan to clear the zone. A Michigan defender inadvertently passed the puck backward into the net. After the game, Michigan coach Vic Heyliger said, "When these boys want to play hockey, they can really get out there and play. This is what we've been waiting for."

=== Ineligible Players ===
On February 7 the Big Ten ruled that Mike Buchanan and Wally Maxwell were ineligible to play due to having accepted expense money from outside sources while playing in high school. While the ruling ended the college careers of both players, no action was taken against Michigan as the violations occurred prior to either player entering college. Furthermore, Michigan was not required to forfeit any games in which either player had participated (including the 1955 national championship in which Buchanan had played).

== 1956 NCAA championship ==
After compiling an 18–2–1 record and winning the Western Intercollegiate Hockey League (WIHL) championship, Michigan was invited to participate in the Frozen Four for the ninth consecutive year. The 1956 NCAA Division I Men's Ice Hockey Tournament was held at Broadmoor Arena at The Broadmoor, a luxury hotel located in Colorado Springs, Colorado. St. Lawrence University (from Canton, New York) and Boston College were invited from the East and Michigan and Michigan Technological University (from Houghton, Michigan) were invited from the West.

=== Semifinal vs. St. Lawrence ===
On March 16, 1956, the Wolverines faced the St. Lawrence Saints in the opening round. Neither team scored in the first period, as Michigan goalie Lorne Howes made 11 saves and the Wolverines were held to five shots on goal. St. Lawrence took a 1–0 lead with an unassisted goal by McKinnon with less than a minute remaining in the second period. St. Lawrence goalie Whittier had 15 saves in the second period. At the 3:59 mark in the third period, Michigan tied the score at 1–1 as Ed Switzer scored a goal with assists by Neil McDonald and Bob Pitts. Howes made 13 saves in the third period (30 saves in the game), and the third period ended in a tie. In the overtime period, Tom Rendall scored the winning goal at the 1:21 mark with an assist from Don McIntosh.

=== Championship vs. Michigan Tech. ===
On March 17, 1956, the Wolverines faced the Michigan Tech Huskies in the championship game. The Wolverines and Huskies had played four times in the regular season with Michigan winning all four games by a combined score of 21–7. In the championship game, Michigan struck first with a goal by Ed Switzer, assisted by Neil McDonald, only 23 seconds into the game. The period ended with Michigan ahead 4–3. Michigan's remaining goals in the first period were scored by Neil McDonald (assist by Bob Schiller at 9:22), Aubrey (unassisted at 11:04), and Schiller (assist by McDonald at 13:11). Michigan goalie Lorne Howes made 19 saves in the first period. In the second period, Michigan Tech took a 5–4 lead, scoring two goals in the opening 7:15. The Wolverines tied the score at 5–5 on a goal by Ed Switzer, assisted by Bernie Hanna at 7:58. Michigan then took the lead, scoring two goals within 11 seconds of the other. Switzer scored at the 14:38 mark (assist by Dick Dunnigan), and Neil McDonald followed with an unassisted goal at 14:49. The third period was scoreless as Howes tallied 19 more saves. Switzer's third goal of the game gave him a hat trick.

==== (W1) Michigan vs. (W2) Michigan Tech ====
March 17	Michigan	7 – 5	Michigan Tech	Broadmoor Ice Palace

Scoring summary
Period	Team	Goal	Assist(s)	Time	Score
1st	UM	Ed Switzer	McDonald	00:23	1–0 UM
1st	MTU	Dick Wilson	J. McManus	02:42	1–1
1st	UM	Neil McDonald	Schiller	09:22	2–1 UM
1st	UM	Don McIntosh	Rendall	10:14	3–1 UM
1st	MTU	Pete Aubry	unassisted	11:04	3–2 UM
1st	UM	Bob Schiller	McDonald	13:11	4–2 UM
1st	MTU	Dick Wilson	unassisted	19:45	4–3 UM
2nd	MTU	Tom Kennedy	Wilson	24:47	4–4
2nd	MTU	Pete Aubry – PP	Wilson	27:25	5–4 MTU
2nd	UM	Ed Switzer	Hanna	27:58	5–5
2nd	UM	Ed Switzer – GW PP	Dunnigan	34:28	6–5 UM
2nd	UM	Neil McDonald	unassisted	34:49	7–5 UM
3rd	None				

Shots by period
Team	1	2	3	T
Michigan Tech	22	10	10	42
Michigan	14	14	11	39

Goaltenders
Team	Name	Saves	Goals against	Time on ice
MTU	Bob McManus	32	7	
UM	Lorne Howes	37	5	

=== All-Tournament Team ===
Michigan goalie Lorne Howes, who totaled 46 saves in the championship game, was named the Most Outstanding Player of the Tournament. Michigan players also took five of six first-team spots on the Associated Press All-Tournament Team. The Michigan players so honored were Howes, defensemen Bob Pitts and Bob Schiller, center Tom Rendall, and wing Ed Switzer. Shortly after winning the championship, the members of the Michigan hockey team selected Bob Pitts as captain of the 1956–57 Michigan hockey team.

== Roster and scoring statistics ==
Fourteen players received varsity letters for the 1955–56 Michigan hockey team. Those 14 players are listed in bold below. Richard T. Brown received the Manager's "M".

No.	Name	Year	Position	Hometown	S/P/C	Games	Goals	Assists	Pts	PIM
1	**Lorne Howes**	Senior	G	Kirkland Lake, ON	(Ontario)	–	–	–	–	–
2	Mike Buchanan	Junior	D	Ottawa, ON	(Ontario)	–	–	–	–	–
3	**Bob Shiller**	Junior	D	Riverside, ON	(Ontario)	–	–	–	–	–
4	**Bernie Hanna**	Junior	D	Calgary, AB	(Alberta)	–	–	–	–	–
5	**Bob Pitts**	Junior	D	Castlegar, BC	(British Columbia)	–	–	–	–	–
6	**Dick Dunnigan**	Junior	RW	Edmonton, AB	(Alberta)	–	–	–	–	–
7	**Bill MacFarland**	Senior	LW	Toronto, ON	(Ontario)	23	19	28	**47**	45
8	**Jerry Karpinka**	Junior	LW	Edmonton, AB	(Alberta)	–	–	–	–	–
9	**Jay Goold**	Senior	RW	Kirkland Lake, ON	(Ontario)	–	–	–	–	–
10	Wally Maxwell	Sophomore	F	Toronto, ON	(Ontario)	–	7	4	**11**	8
11	**Neil Buchanan**	Junior	D	Ottawa, ON	(Ontario)	–	–	–	–	–
12	**Tom Rendall**	Junior	C	Winnipeg, MB	(Manitoba)	–	–	–	–	–
14	**Don McIntosh**	Sophomore	C	Toronto, ON	(Ontario)	–	–	–	–	–
15	**Neil McDonald**	Sophomore	C	Preston, ON	(Ontario)	–	–	–	–	–
16	Morley Chin	Sophomore	F	Toronto, ON	(Ontario)	–	–	–	–	–
17	**Ed Switzer**	Sophomore	LW	Preston, ON	(Ontario)	–	–	–	–	–
	**Baden Cosby**	Junior	F	Gravenhurst, ON	(Ontario)	–	–	–	–	–
Total										

== See also ==
- 1956 NCAA Division I Men's Ice Hockey Tournament
- List of NCAA Division I Men's Ice Hockey Tournament champions
