= Joe McLean (ice hockey) =

Canadian ice hockey player

- Born: Ottawa, Ontario, Canada
- Position: Center
- Played for: St. Lawrence
- Playing career: 1954–1957

Joe McLean is a Canadian retired ice hockey center who was an All-American for St. Lawrence.

== Career ==
In 1953 McLean, along with fellow Ottawa-natives Lee Fornier and Ron O'Brien all agreed to accept scholarships at nearby St. Lawrence University. The three built a tremendous working partnership during their year with the freshman team and when they debuted for the varsity squad in 1954 the trio provided the bulk of the Saints' offense. The sophomores were the top three scorers for the saints with O'Brien leading the team with 58 points. As of 2020 all three totals were in the top five for rookie performances in St. Lawrence history. The 69 combined goals from the 'Ottawa Connection' were more than half the total offense from the saints that season and was enough to get the Larries back into the NCAA tournament. In the semifinal against Colorado College the young players were held back by a veteran defensive corps and St. Lawrence fell 2–1. In the consolation game the following night the Saints lost again, finishing in 4th place, but the line was again held scoreless. It was no surprise that SLU finished last in the tournament when their top offensive contributors came up empty.

The three were again the font of the team's offense in their junior seasons, this time with McLean leading the Larries in scoring. The Saints finished in second place in their conference but, because Clarkson declined their tournament bid, St. Lawrence went in their place. St. Lawrence faced defending champion Michigan in the semifinal and the two fought a defensive battle through most of the game. SLU scored first at the end of the second period but Michigan tied the score shortly after the third began. The game went into overtime but the Wolverines weren't waiting around and scored just over 80 seconds into the extra session to again send the Larries to the consolation game. St. Lawrence was pitted against Boston College and this time the Saints offense made an appearance. After building a 1-goal lead in the first, BC's guns fell silent thanks to Sarge Whittier, who was playing only because regular starter Bill Sloan was ineligible for the tournament, and St. Lawrence scored three goals in rapid succession to put the team ahead for good. McLean began the outburst by tying the score with the first point from any of the three linemates and went on to be named to the All-Tournament Second Team.

McLean was named team captain for the following season and he responded by again leading the Saints in scoring. SLU, however, had a down year and finished 3rd in the Tri-State League. Despite the less-than-stellar season for the team, McLean was named as an AHCA Second Team All-American and finished his career as the program's 3rd-leading scorer, just behind O'Brian and just ahead of Fornier.

In 1993, with all three players inextricably linked, St. Lawrence inducted all three as the 'Ottawa Connection' into their Athletic Hall of Fame.

== Statistics ==
=== Regular season and playoffs ===
			Regular season					Playoffs
Season	Team	League	GP	G	A	Pts	PIM	GP	G	A	Pts	PIM
1952–53	Ottawa St. Jean-Baptiste	OCJHL	—	—	—	—	—	—	—	—	—	—
1954–55	St. Lawrence	Tri-State League	23	22	24	46	—	—	—	—	—	—
1955–56	St. Lawrence	Tri-State League	22	26	23	49	—	—	—	—	—	—
1956–57	St. Lawrence	Tri-State League	20	24	26	50	—	—	—	—	—	—
NCAA totals			65	72	73	145	—	—	—	—	—	—

== Awards and honors ==
Award	Year
NCAA All-Tournament Second Team	1956
AHCA Second Team All-American	1956–57
