= Wally Maxwell =

Canadian ice hockey player (1933–2026)

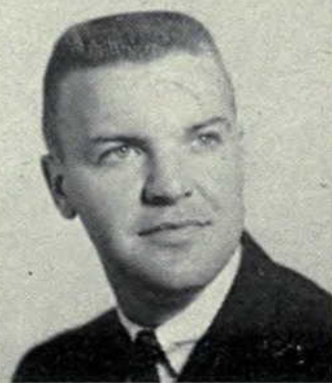
- Maxwell from the 1959 Michiganensian
- Born: August 24, 1933 Ottawa, Ontario, Canada
- Died: January 31, 2026 (aged 92)
- Height: 5 ft 10 in (178 cm)
- Weight: 170 lb (77 kg; 12 st 2 lb)
- Position: Centre, left wing
- Shot: Left
- Played for: Toronto Maple Leafs
- Playing career: 1950–1960

Wallace David Maxwell (August 24, 1933 – January 31, 2026) was a Canadian professional ice hockey player who played two games in the National Hockey League. He played with the Toronto Maple Leafs during the 1952–53 season. He also played on the 1955–56 Michigan Wolverines men's ice hockey team that won the 1956 NCAA Division I Men's Ice Hockey Tournament. Maxwell died on January 31, 2026, at the age of 92.

== Career statistics ==
=== Regular season and playoffs ===
			Regular season					Playoffs
Season	Team	League	GP	G	A	Pts	PIM	GP	G	A	Pts	PIM
1950–51	Toronto Marlboros	OHA	38	18	22	40	24	13	5	11	16	9
1951–52	Toronto Marlboros	OHA	53	28	49	77	42	6	5	2	7	6
1952–53	Toronto Marlboros	OHA	51	22	51	73	49	1	0	0	0	0
1952–53	Toronto Maple Leafs	NHL	2	0	0	0	0	—	—	—	—	—
1953–54	Toronto Marlboros	OHA	59	42	32	74	82	15	11	5	16	20
1955–56	University of Michigan	WIHL	—	7	4	11	8	—	—	—	—	—
1956–57	University of Michigan	WIHL	—	10	6	16	14	—	—	—	—	—
1957–58	Whitby Dunlops	OHA Sr	14	1	6	7	2	—	—	—	—	—
1957–58	Windsor Bulldogs	OHA Sr	33	12	12	24	15	11	6	2	8	2
1958–59	Windsor Bulldogs	OHA Sr	31	8	15	23	17	—	—	—	—	—
1959–60	Toledo-St. Louis Mercurys	IHL	3	0	0	0	2	—	—	—	—	—
1960–61	Oakville Oaks	OHA Sr	31	21	27	48	—	—	—	—	—	—
1961–62	Oakville Oaks	OHA Sr	10	7	3	10	—	—	—	—	—	—
1961–62	Port Arthur Bearcats	TBSHL	—	—	—	—	—	—	—	—	—	—
NHL totals			2	0	0	0	0	—	—	—	—	—
