= 1955 NCAA men's ice hockey tournament =

College ice hockey tournament

- Teams: 4
- Finals site: Broadmoor Ice Palace, Colorado Springs, Colorado
- Champions: Michigan Wolverines (5th title)
- Runner-up: Colorado College Tigers (3rd title game)
- Semifinalists: Harvard Crimson (1st Frozen Four); St. Lawrence Saints (2nd Frozen Four)
- Winning coach: Vic Heyliger (5th title)
- MOP: Philip Hilton (Colorado College)
- Attendance: 9,000

The 1955 NCAA Men's Ice Hockey Tournament was the culmination of the 1954–55 NCAA men's ice hockey season, the eighth such tournament in NCAA history. It was held between March 10 and 12, 1955, and concluded with Michigan defeating Colorado College 5–3. All games were played at the Broadmoor Ice Palace in Colorado Springs, Colorado.

== Qualifying teams ==
Four teams qualified for the tournament, two each from the eastern and western regions. The two best WIHL teams and a Tri-State League representative received bids into the tournament as did one independent school.

East							West						
Seed	School	Conference	Record	Berth type	Appearance	Last bid	Seed	School	Conference	Record	Berth type	Appearance	Last bid
1	Harvard	Independent	16–2–1	At-Large	1st	Never	1	Colorado College	WIHL	21–5–0	At-Large	6th	1952
2	St. Lawrence	Tri-State League	19–3–1	At-Large	2nd	1952	2	Michigan	WIHL	16–5–1	At-Large	8th	1954

== Format ==
The eastern team judged as better was seeded as the top eastern team while the WIHL champion was given the top western seed. The second eastern seed was slotted to play the top western seed and vice versa. All games were played at the Broadmoor Ice Palace. All matches were Single-game eliminations with the semifinal winners advancing to the national championship game and the losers playing in a consolation game.

== Bracket ==
Semifinals; March 10–11
E1	Harvard	3
W2	Michigan	7
W1	Colorado College	2
E2	St. Lawrence	1

National Championship; March 12
W2	Michigan	5
W1	Colorado College	3
Third Place Game
E1	Harvard	6
E2	St. Lawrence	3

Note: * denotes overtime period(s)

=== Semifinals ===
==== Harvard vs. Michigan ====
March 10	Harvard	3 – 7	Michigan	Broadmoor Ice Palace	Recap
No Scoring		First period	04:36 - Bill MacFarland (unassisted); 17:05 - Dick Dunnigan (MacFarland, Schiller)
(Coolegde) Bill Cleary - 07:58 (unassisted) Bill Cleary - 15:50		Second period	03:21 - Tom Rendall (Dunnigan); 13:08 - GW - Bill MacFarland (unassisted)
(unassisted) Francis Mahoney - 01:29		Third period	02:15 - Bill MacFarland (unassisted); 03:22 - Neil Buchanan (unassisted); 18:09 - Tom Rendall (unassisted)
( 39 saves / 46 shots ) Charlie Flynn		Goalie stats	Lorne Howes ( 41 saves / 44 shots )

==== Colorado College vs. St. Lawrence ====
March 11	Colorado College	2 – 1	St. Lawrence	Broadmoor Ice Palace	Recap
No Scoring		First period
(unassisted) Ken Smith - 04:04 (Hilton) Ken Smith - GW - 16:22		Second period
		Third period	11:48 - Ed Zifcak (Meehan, Walker)
( 29 saves / 30 shots ) Jeff Simus		Goalie stats	Bill Sloan ( 42 saves / 44 shots )

=== Consolation Game ===
==== Harvard vs. St. Lawrence ====
March 12	Harvard	6 – 3	St. Lawrence	Broadmoor Ice Palace	Recap
No Scoring		First period	18:20 - Brian McFarlane (Zifcak)
(Cooledge) Douglas Manchester - 07:08 (unassisted) Francis Mahoney - 14:49 (unassisted) Bill Cleary - 15:28 (Mahoney) Edward Bliss - GW - 18:08		Second period	05:14 - Bernie McKinnon (Swancott); 18:26 - Bill Meehan (McFarlane)
(unassisted) Bill Cleary - 11:00 (unassisted) Bill Cleary - 12:10		Third period
( 43 saves / 46 shots ) Charlie Flynn		Goalie stats	Bill Sloan ( 25 saves / 31 shots )

=== National Championship ===
==== Colorado College vs. Michigan ====
March 12	Colorado College	3 – 5	Michigan	Broadmoor Ice Palace

Scoring summary
Period	Team	Goal	Assist(s)	Time	Score
1st	UM	Tom Rendall	unassisted	02:38	1–0 UM
2nd	CC	Phil Hilton	unassisted	22:28	1–1
2nd	UM	Neil Buchanan	M. Buchanan	39:23	2–1 UM
3rd	UM	Jay Goold	unassisted	46:18	3–1 UM
3rd	CC	Don Wishart	Hubchik	47:34	3–2 UM
3rd	UM	Jerry Karpinka – GW	Dunnigan	48:31	4–2 UM
3rd	CC	Clare Smith	Silverberg	57:23	4–3 UM
3rd	UM	Bill MacFarland – EN	unassisted	59:57	5–3 UM
Penalty summary
Period	Team	Player	Penalty	Time	PIM
1st	CC	Ken Smith			
1st	UM	Bob Schiller			
2nd	CC	Bunt Hubchik			
2nd	UM	Bernie Hanna			
2nd	UM	Bob Schiller			
2nd	CC	Hal Cowan			
2nd	CC	Hal Cowan			
2nd	UM	Lorne Howes			
2nd	CC	Don Wishart			
2nd	UM	Neil Buchanan			
3rd	UM	Jay Gould			
3rd	UM	Bob Schiller			
3rd	CC	Bunt Hubchik			
3rd	CC	Clare Smith			
3rd	CC	Bunt Hubchik			
3rd	CC	Bunt Hubchik			
3rd	UM	Jerry Karpinka			
3rd	UM	Mike Buchanan			

Shots by period
Team	1	2	3	T
Michigan	9	6	11	26
Colorado College	12	15	23	50

Goaltenders
Team	Name	Saves	Goals against	Time on ice
UM	Lorne Howes	47	3	
CC	Jeff Simus	22	4	

== All-Tournament Team ==
=== First Team ===
- G: Lorne Howes (Michigan)
- D: Phil Hilton* (Colorado College)
- D: Doug Silverberg (Colorado College)
- F: Bill Cleary (Harvard)
- F: Bill MacFarland (Michigan)
- F: Tom Rendall (Michigan)

* Most Outstanding Player(s)

=== Second Team ===
- G: Bill Sloan (St. Lawrence)
- D: Bob Schiller (Michigan)
- D: Mike Buchanan (Michigan)
- F: Clare Smith (Colorado College)
- F: Ken Smith (Colorado College)
- F: Dick Dunnigan (Michigan)
