= Jack McManus (ice hockey) =

Canadian ice hockey player

- Born: North Bay, Ontario, Canada
- Height: 5 ft 10 in (178 cm)
- Weight: 165 lb (75 kg; 11 st 11 lb)
- Position: Forward
- Played for: Michigan Tech
- Playing career: 1953–1960

Jack G. McManus is a Canadian retired ice hockey forward who helped Michigan Tech reach the National Championship game for the first time in program history in 1956.

== Career ==
McManus arrived in Houghton in the fall of 1953 and, due to the team not having a freshman team, began playing immediately for the varsity squad. He put up modest totals in his first year but broke out as a star in his sophomore season. He led the team in scoring with 25 goals and 45 points in 25 games as Tech rose from dead last in the WIHL to 4th. The surprising jump earned McManus an AHCA Second Team All-American spot. The team continued to ascend as McManus led the offense; the Huskies finished 2nd in their conference in 1955–56 and received the second western seed for the NCAA Tournament. Michigan Tech blew past Boston College in the semifinal with a 10–4 win, and advanced to face Michigan in the championship match. McManus assisted on the Huskies first goal of the game and the contest went back and forth through the first half. Tech grabbed a lead in the 2nd period but it lasted all of 30 seconds and three successive goals from the Wolverines put them ahead for good.

In his final season McManus was named team captain and led the team in scoring for the third consecutive season. He finished his career as the all-time leader in both goals (88) and points (160) and despite playing in far fewer games than most succeeding players he still remains 5th on in goals in program history.

A few years after graduating, McManus played for the Minneapolis Millers in their first season but called it quits soon thereafter. He was inducted into the Michigan Tech Athletic Hall of Fame in 1995.

== Statistics ==
=== Regular season and playoffs ===
			Regular season					Playoffs
Season	Team	League	GP	G	A	Pts	PIM	GP	G	A	Pts	PIM
1953–54	Michigan Tech	WIHL	25	8	8	16	10	—	—	—	—	—
1954–55	Michigan Tech	WIHL	26	25	20	45	33	—	—	—	—	—
1955–56	Michigan Tech	WIHL	28	29	23	52	14	—	—	—	—	—
1956–57	Michigan Tech	WIHL	28	26	23	49	26	—	—	—	—	—
1959–60	Minneapolis Millers	IHL	—	—	—	—	—	—	—	—	—	—
NCAA totals			107	88	72	160	83	—	—	—	—	—

== Awards and honors ==
Award	Year
All-WIHL Second Team	1954–55
AHCA Second Team All-American	1954–55
All-WIHL First Team	1955–56
AHCA Second Team All-American	1955–56
All-WIHL Second Team	1956–57
