= Doug Silverberg =

Canadian ice hockey player (born 1933)

- Born: January 16, 1933 (age 93) Red Deer, Alberta, Canada
- Height: 6 ft 1 in (185 cm)
- Weight: 190 lb (86 kg; 13 st 8 lb)
- Position: Defenseman
- Shot: Right
- Played for: Colorado College
- Playing career: 1953–1956

Douglas Silverberg (born January 16, 1933) is a Canadian retired ice hockey defenseman who was a two-time All-American for Colorado College.

== Career ==
Silverberg began attending Colorado College in 1952 and joined the varsity team a year later. After a good sophomore season, he led the Tigers' defensive corps as the team climbed back to the top of the WIHL in 1955, earning recognition as an AHCA First Team All-American. CC shut down St. Lawrence in the semifinal to reach their third championship game but they ran into a stellar goaltending performance from Lorne Howes and fell to rival Michigan 3–5.

In Silverberg's senior season, Colorado College regressed just enough to allow Michigan Tech to slip past them in the standings and the team failed to reach the tournament. Silverberg was still regarded as one of the best defenders in the country and he was both a conference All-Star and national All-American.

== Statistics ==
=== Regular season and playoffs ===
| | | | Regular season | | | | | Playoffs |
| Season | Team | League | GP | G | A | Pts | PIM | GP | G | A | Pts | PIM |
|---|---|---|---|---|---|---|---|---|---|---|---|---|
| 1953–54 | Colorado College | WIHL | — | 3 | 5 | 8 | — | — | — | — | — | — |
| 1954–55 | Colorado College | WIHL | 28 | 7 | 11 | 18 | — | — | — | — | — | — |
| 1955–56 | Colorado College | WIHL | — | — | — | — | — | — | — | — | — | — |
| NCAA totals | | | — | — | — | — | — | — | — | — | — | — |

== Awards and honors ==
| Award | Year |
|---|---|
| All-WIHL First Team | 1954–55 |
| AHCA First Team All-American | 1954–55 |
| NCAA All-Tournament First Team | 1955 |
| All-WIHL First Team | 1955–56 |
| AHCA First Team All-American | 1955–56 |
