= Chuck Lundberg =

American ice hockey player (born 1934)

- Born: August 25, 1934 (age 92) Framingham, Massachusetts, U.S.
- Position: Defenseman
- Played for: St. Lawrence
- Playing career: 1952–1956

Charles "Chuck" Lundberg (born August 25, 1934) is an American retired ice hockey defenseman who was an AHCA Second Team All-American for St. Lawrence.

== Career ==
Lundberg arrived in Canton, New York in the fall of 1952 and, because St. Lawrence University did not support a freshman team, he began playing with the varsity squad straight away. the team played well in his first year but it was during his sophomore year that the Saints became a power in the east. The team went 18–3–1, allowing just 56 goals in 22 games and finished with a first place tie for the Tri-State League championship. Unfortunately, It was a late-season loss to Rensselaer that cost St. Lawrence a chance at an NCAA title.

In his junior season the team performed even better, winning 19 games and capturing the league championship outright. The team received the second eastern seed and put up a hard fight against Colorado College in the semifinal but lost 1–2. The following night in the consolation game the team was on the receiving end of a scoring outburst from Bill Cleary, the NCAA scoring champion, and finished in 4th place. in his senior season Lundberg again helped the Larries reach the NCAA tournament but because he was a 4th-year varsity player he was ineligible to participate in the tournament and could only watch as the Saints fell to Michigan in overtime. After the season he was named as an AHCA Second Team All-American, one of three Saints to be so honored that season.

== Statistics ==
=== Regular season and playoffs ===
			Regular season					Playoffs
Season	Team	League	GP	G	A	Pts	PIM	GP	G	A	Pts	PIM
1952–53	St. Lawrence	Tri-State League	—	—	—	—	—	—	—	—	—	—
1953–54	St. Lawrence	Tri-State League	—	—	—	—	—	—	—	—	—	—
1954–55	St. Lawrence	Tri-State League	—	—	—	—	—	—	—	—	—	—
1955–56	St. Lawrence	Tri-State League	—	—	—	—	—	—	—	—	—	—
NCAA totals			64	10	26	36	—	—	—	—	—	—

== Awards and honors ==
Award	Year
AHCA Second Team All-American	1955–56
