= Tom Rendall =

Canadian ice hockey player

Thomas W. Rendall (August 11, 1933 – April 7, 2002) was a Canadian ice hockey center.

A native of Winnipeg, Manitoba, Rendall played for the 1951 Memorial Cup finalist and 1952 Manitoba Junior Hockey League (MJHL) champion Winnipeg Monarchs. He played on two MJHL championship teams.

Rendall played college hockey at the University of Michigan from 1954 to 1957 and was a member of the 1954–55 and 1955–56 Michigan Wolverines men's ice hockey teams that won the 1955 and 1956 NCAA Division I Men's Ice Hockey Tournaments. As of 2014, Rendall is the only player in NCAA history to be named to the All-Tournament Team more than twice.

After graduating from Michigan, Rendall played professional hockey. He played for the Oakville Oaks, Winnipeg Maroons, and Spokane Jets. He played for the Spokane Jets from 1967 to 1974 and was a member of Allan Cup championship teams in 1970 and 1972.

Rendall died in Spokane, Washington, in 2002 at age 68.

== Awards and honors ==
Award	Year
AHCA All-American	1954–55
All-NCAA All-Tournament First Team	1955
All-WIHL Second Team	1955–56
All-NCAA All-Tournament First Team	1956
All-WIHL Second Team	1956–57
All-NCAA All-Tournament First Team	1957

- Turnbull Cup MJHL Championships (1951 & 1952)
- Allan Cup Championships (1970 & 1972)
- "Honoured Member" of the Manitoba Hockey Hall of Fame
