= 1956–57 NCAA men's ice hockey season =

- Duration: November 1956– March 16, 1957
- NCAA tournament: 1957
- National championship: Broadmoor Ice Palace; Colorado Springs, Colorado
- NCAA champion: Colorado College

The 1956–57 NCAA men's ice hockey season began in November 1956 and concluded with the 1957 NCAA Men's Ice Hockey Tournament's championship game on March 16, 1957 at the Broadmoor Ice Palace in Colorado Springs, Colorado. This was the 10th season in which an NCAA ice hockey championship was held and is the 63rd year overall where an NCAA school fielded a team.

== Regular season ==
=== Season tournaments ===
Tournament	Dates	Teams	Champion
Boston Arena Christmas Tournament	December 27–29	8	Harvard
Rensselaer Holiday Tournament	December 27–29	4	Michigan Tech
Beanpot	February 1, 5	4	Boston College

=== Standings ===
1956–57 NCAA Independent ice hockey standings
	Intercollegiate							Overall					
	GP	W	L	T	Pct.	GF	GA	GP	W	L	T	GF	GA
Amherst	–	–	–	–	–	–	–	14	7	7	0	–	–
American International	–	–	–	–	–	–	–	18	5	13	0	–	–
Army	17	13	4	0	.765	118	57	18	14	4	0	125	59
Boston College	–	–	–	–	–	–	–	22	14	7	1	108	76
Boston University	23	13	9	1	.587	112	84	23	13	9	1	112	84
Bowdoin	–	–	–	–	–	–	–	17	3	14	0	–	–
Brown	–	–	–	–	–	–	–	20	6	14	0	68	113
Colby	–	–	–	–	–	–	–	14	7	6	1	–	–
Dartmouth	–	–	–	–	–	–	–	25	13	12	0	105	104
Hamilton	–	–	–	–	–	–	–	17	4	13	0	–	–
Harvard	–	–	–	–	–	–	–	26	21	5	0	142	58
Massachusetts	–	–	–	–	–	–	–	13	5	8	0	47	53
Merrimack	–	–	–	–	–	–	–	9	4	4	1	49	39
MIT	–	–	–	–	–	–	–	14	5	9	0	–	–
New Hampshire	–	–	–	–	–	–	–	15	7	7	1	57	62
Northeastern	–	–	–	–	–	–	–	25	10	14	1	123	127
Norwich	–	–	–	–	–	–	–	19	6	12	1	–	–
Princeton	–	–	–	–	–	–	–	19	2	17	0	44	88
Providence	–	–	–	–	–	–	–	18	11	7	0	109	88
St. Olaf	–	–	–	–	–	–	–	14	12	2	0	–	–
Tufts	–	–	–	–	–	–	–	16	10	6	0	–	–
Williams	–	–	–	–	–	–	–	17	10	7	0	–	–
Yale	–	–	–	–	–	–	–	25	10	15	0	81	134

1956–57 Minnesota Intercollegiate Athletic Conference ice hockey standings
	Conference							Overall					
	GP	W	L	T	PTS	GF	GA	GP	W	L	T	GF	GA
Minnesota–Duluth †	12	12	0	0	1.000	–	–	23	16	4	3	–	–
Augsburg	–	–	–	–	–	–	–	–	–	–	–	–	–
Concordia	–	–	–	–	–	–	–	10	1	9	0	–	–
Gustavus Adolphus	–	–	–	–	–	–	–	12	8	4	0	–	–
Hamline	–	–	–	–	–	–	–	–	–	–	–	–	–
Macalester	–	–	–	–	–	–	–	–	–	–	–	–	–
Saint John's	–	–	–	–	–	–	–	15	8	7	0	–	–
St. Thomas	–	–	–	–	–	–	–	12	9	3	0	–	–
† indicates conference champion

1956–57 Tri-State League standings
	Conference							Overall					
	GP	W	L	T	PTS	GF	GA	GP	W	L	T	GF	GA
Rensselaer†	6	5	1	0	10	34	19	21	14	6	1	117	69
Clarkson	6	4	2	0	8	30	18	22	19	3	0	123	46
St. Lawrence	6	3	3	0	6	33	19	20	13	7	0	111	61
Middlebury	6	0	6	0	0	9	50	22	11	11	0	–	–
† indicates conference regular season champion

1956–57 Western Intercollegiate Hockey League
	Conference								Overall					
	GP	W	L	T	PCT	PTS	GF	GA	GP	W	L	T	GF	GA
Colorado College†	18	14	4	0	.778	19	93	69	30	25	5	0	205	105
Michigan	18	13	4	1	.750	16½	76	55	25	18	5	2	112	79
North Dakota	22	13	9	0	.591	13	82	72	29	18	11	0	126	99
Michigan Tech	20	8	8	4	.500	12½	80	76	28	14	9	5	133	97
Denver	18	6	11	1	.361	9	64	74	28	12	14	2	121	105
Minnesota	24	7	15	2	.333	8	69	92	29	12	15	2	96	96
Michigan State	20	5	15	0	.250	6	42	68	22	7	15	0	62	71
† indicates conference regular season champion Note: All games played between league members counted in the standings. When teams played each other twice, two points were awarded for a win, one point for a tie. When teams met each other four times, one point was awarded for a win, one-half point for a tie. Maximum 24 points available.

== 1957 NCAA Tournament ==
Semifinals; March 14–15
W1	Colorado College	5
E2	Clarkson	3
E1	Harvard	1
W2	Michigan	6

National championship March 16
W1	Colorado College	13
W2	Michigan	6
Third-place game
E1	Clarkson	2*
E2	Harvard	1

Note: * denotes overtime period(s)

== Player stats ==
=== Scoring leaders ===
The following players led the league in points at the conclusion of the season.

GP = Games played; G = Goals; A = Assists; Pts = Points; PIM = Penalty minutes

Player	Class	Team	GP	G	A	Pts	PIM
Bob Cleary	Junior	Harvard	26	36	37	73	-
Bill Hay	Sophomore	Colorado College	30	28	45	73	-
Bob McCusker	Sophomore	Colorado College	-	47	24	71	-
Ed Rowe	Senior	Clarkson	22	31	32	63	-
Bill Reichart	Senior	North Dakota	29	36	24	60	13
Paul Midghall	Freshman	Rensselaer	21	24	35	59	24
Dick Chiarelli	Senior	Rensselaer	21	32	25	57	38
Joe McLean	Senior	St. Lawrence	20	24	26	50	-
Jack McManus	Senior	Michigan Tech	28	26	23	49	26
Jim Ridley	Junior	North Dakota	29	23	26	49	26

=== Leading goaltenders ===
The following goaltenders led the league in goals against average at the end of the regular season while playing at least 33% of their team's total minutes.

GP = Games played; Min = Minutes played; W = Wins; L = Losses; OT = Overtime/shootout losses; GA = Goals against; SO = Shutouts; SV% = Save percentage; GAA = Goals against average

Player	Class	Team	GP	Min	W	L	OT	GA	SO	SV%	GAA
Rodney Schneck	Sophomore	Denver	-	-	10	-	-	-	2	.913	2.20
Jack McCartan	Junior	Minnesota	15	900	-	-	-	43	0	-	2.80
Sarge Whittier	Senior	St. Lawrence	17	984	-	-	-	44	0	.888	3.16
Andy LaHaye	Senior	Michigan Tech	-	-	-	-	-	-	1	.864	3.20
Don Vaia	Junior	Minnesota	16	-	-	-	-	-	-	-	3.20
John Stopen	Senior	Rensselaer	18	1052	11	6	1	59	0	.876	3.36
Tom Yurkovich	Senior	North Dakota	29	-	18	11	0	-	2	.874	3.40
Joseph Selinger	Sophomore	Michigan State	20	-	-	-	-	-	-	-	3.40
Bob McManus	Senior	Michigan Tech	24	-	-	-	-	-	-	.878	3.50
Gerry Jones	Sophomore	Yale	-	-	-	-	-	-	-	-	3.80

== Awards ==
=== NCAA ===
Award		Recipient
Spencer Penrose Award		Jack Riley, Army
Most Outstanding Player in NCAA Tournament		Bob McCusker, Colorado College
AHCA All-American Teams
First Team	Position	Second Team
Jack McCartan, Minnesota	G	Eddie MacDonald, Clarkson
Don Wishart, Colorado College	D	John Petroske, Minnesota
Pat Presley, St. Lawrence	D	Bill Steenson, North Dakota
Bill Hay, Colorado College	F	Bob Cleary, Harvard
Bill Reichart, North Dakota	F	Joe McLean, St. Lawrence
Ed Rowe, Clarkson	F	Bob McCusker, Colorado College

=== WIHL ===
No Awards

All-WIHL Teams
First Team	Position	Second Team
Jack McCartan, Minnesota	G	Tom Yurkovich, North Dakota
Bill Steenson, North Dakota	D	Bob Pitts, Michigan
Don Wishart, Colorado College	D	Bob Schiller, Michigan
Bill Hay, Colorado College	F	Jack McManus, Michigan Tech
Bill Reichart, North Dakota	F	Tom Rendall, Michigan
Bob McCusker, Colorado College	F	Tom Kennedy, Michigan Tech
