= Ed Zifcak =

American ice hockey player (born 1934)

- Born: February 5, 1934 (age 92) Pascoag, Rhode Island, U.S.
- Height: 6 ft 0 in (183 cm)
- Weight: 175 lb (79 kg; 12 st 7 lb)
- Position: Left wing
- Shot: Left
- Played for: St. Lawrence
- National team: United States
- Playing career: 1952–1956

Edward Zifcak (born February 5, 1934) is an American retired ice hockey left winger who was an AHCA Second team all-american for St. Lawrence. He wsas enshrined in the Rhode Island Hockey Hall of Fame on August 15, 2026.

== Career ==
Zifcak was a star player for the Burrillville Broncos as a junior player and his scoring punch garnered him an athletic scholarship with St. Lawrence University. He started playing for the varsity team in 1952, just after the team made its first NCAA tournament appearance. The Saints were a decent team in his first year with the squad but it was in his second year that the team began to dominate their competition. The Saints finished the year with an 18–3–1 record and tied for the Tri-State League championship. However, a loss at the end of the year to co-champion Rensselaer proved costly and the Bachelors received a tournament bid instead of the Saints.

Zifcak's scoring improved dramatically in his junior season and the Larries were again the class of the east, winning the league championship outright and earning an NCAA tournament appearance. The Saints faced Colorado College in the semifinal and had a difficult time scoring. CC held the Larries at bay in the first two periods before Zifcak broke through in the third but his goal was the only one for St. Lawrence and the team headed to the consolation game once again.

For his senior season Zifcak was named co-team captain along with Bill Sloan and led the team to another stellar season (17–4). The Saints made their third tournament appearance but because Zifcak was in his 4th year of varsity play (the NCAA limited players to 3 years of varsity play at the time) Zifcak was unable to play. Despite having to watch from the sidelines, Zifcak was named as an AHCA Second team all-american along with two other teammates.

After graduating Zifcak joined the US national team. While the team boycotted the 1957 World Championships due to the Soviet Union's response to the Hungarian Revolution of 1956, he remained with the team and played in the 1958 tournament. The team finished in 5th place with Zifcak being held scoreless in four games.

Zifcak continued to play hockey, appearing in games as late as 1967.

== Statistics ==
=== Regular season and playoffs ===
			Regular season					Playoffs
Season	Team	League	GP	G	A	Pts	PIM	GP	G	A	Pts	PIM
1952–53	St. Lawrence	Tri-State League	—	—	—	—	—	—	—	—	—	—
1953–54	St. Lawrence	Tri-State League	—	—	—	—	—	—	—	—	—	—
1954–55	St. Lawrence	Tri-State League	—	—	—	—	—	—	—	—	—	—
1955–56	St. Lawrence	Tri-State League	—	—	—	—	—	—	—	—	—	—
NCAA totals			86	56	66	122	—	—	—	—	—	—

== Awards and honors ==
Award	Year
AHCA Second team all-american	1955–56
