= Bill Reichart =

Canadian ice hockey player (1935–2021)

- Born: July 3, 1935 Winnipeg, Manitoba, Canada
- Died: November 12, 2021 (aged 86) Southern Pines, North Carolina, U.S.
- Height: 5 ft 7 in (170 cm)
- Weight: 166 lb (75 kg; 11 st 12 lb)
- Position: Right wing
- National team: United States
- Playing career: 1949–1969

William Frank Reichart (July 3, 1935 – November 12, 2021) was a Canadian ice hockey forward and Olympian.

Reichart played with Team USA at the 1964 Winter Olympics held in Innsbruck, Austria. He also played for the Rochester Mustangs in the United States Hockey League (USHL), and in the International Hockey League for the Minneapolis Millers, and St. Paul Saints.

In the 1961–62 season, Reichart, Ken Johannson and Herb Brooks formed the highest-scoring forward line in USHL history at the time.

He died in Southern Pines, North Carolina, on November 12, 2021, at the age of 86.

== Awards and honours ==
Award	Year
All-WIHL First Team	1954–55
AHCA First Team All-American	1954–55
All-WIHL First Team	1955–56
All-WIHL First Team	1956–57
AHCA First Team All-American	1956–57
