= Don Wishart =

Canadian ice hockey player (1934–2019)

- Born: April 7, 1934 Portage La Prairie, Manitoba, Canada
- Died: July 16, 2019 (aged 85) Regina, Saskatchewan, Canada
- Position: Defenseman/Forward
- Shot: Left
- Played for: Colorado College
- Playing career: 1954–1957

Don Wishart was a Canadian ice hockey defenseman and forward who captained Colorado College to the National Championship in 1957.

== Career ==
Wishart's junior career was rife with success as he helped the Flin Flon Bombers win three consecutive league championships. After he aged out of the Canadian junior league, Wishart joined Colorado College on an athletic scholarship and immediately joined the varsity ice hockey team. That year the Tigers jumped from 4th to 1st in the WIHL and, with Wishart playing both forward and defense for CC, they made the NCAA tournament for the first time in three years. The Tigers escaped with a close victory over St. Lawrence in the semifinal but, despite scoring in the championship match, Wishart couldn't help the team outlast Michigan in a rematch of the 1952 championship.

The team regressed a bit in Wishart's second season, partly from graduations and also due to the resignation of head coach Cheddy Thompson. New bench boss Tom Bedecki still got the team to a 3rd-place finish but that wasn't enough to get them back to the NCAA tournament. Wishart was named captain for the 1956–57 season and with a massive influx of offensive talent the team went on a rampage in college hockey. Wishart led the defensive corps and helped the offense that produced 199 goals in just 30 games. CC was again WIHL champions and received the top western seed. The team had to fight through a stellar effort from Eddie MacDonald in the semifinal but the 60 shots they set at the Clarkson cage were enough in the end. For the third time in six seasons CC faced Michigan in the final and this time the Tigers would finally defeat their conference rivals. The two teams remained close for the first two periods but the Tigers scored 6 consecutive goals in the third period to put the game out of reach. In his final game, Wishart scored the final Tiger goal and broke the record for the most goals scored in a championship game (Michigan would add one more to increase the total to 19).

Wishart was named to the All-Tournament First Team and was also an AHCA First Team All-American for the season.

== Statistics ==
=== Regular season and playoffs ===
			Regular season					Playoffs
Season	Team	League	GP	G	A	Pts	PIM	GP	G	A	Pts	PIM
1951–52	Flin Flon Bombers	WCJHL	—	—	—	—	—	—	—	—	—	—
1952–53	Flin Flon Bombers	WCJHL	40	11	30	41	33	—	—	—	—	—
1953–54	Flin Flon Bombers	WCJHL	48	31	33	64	30	—	—	—	—	—
1954–55	Colorado College	WIHL	28	19	20	39	—	—	—	—	—	—
1955–56	Colorado College	WIHL	—	—	—	—	—	—	—	—	—	—
1956–57	Colorado College	WIHL	—	10	27	37	—	—	—	—	—	—
NCAA totals			—	—	—	—	—	—	—	—	—	—

== Awards and honors ==
Award	Year
All-WIHL First Team	1956–57
AHCA First Team All-American	1956–57
NCAA All-Tournament First Team	1957
