= Mike Buchanan (ice hockey) =

Canadian ice hockey player

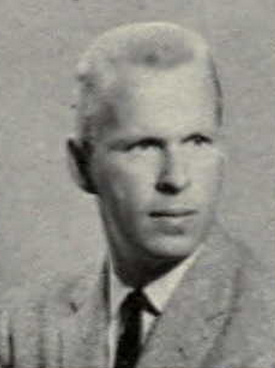
- Buchanan from 1957 Michiganensian
- Born: March 1, 1932; Sault Ste. Marie, Ontario, Canada
- Died: January 3, 2017 (aged 84); White Rock, British Columbia, Canada
- Height: 6 ft 1 in (185 cm)
- Weight: 185 lb (84 kg; 13 st 3 lb)
- Position: Defence
- Shot: Left
- Played for: Chicago Black Hawks; Wembley Lions
- Playing career: 1951–1954; 1956–1958

Michael Murray Buchanan (March 1, 1932 – January 3, 2017) was a Canadian ice hockey defenceman. Buchanan played one game in the National Hockey League for the Chicago Black Hawks during the 1951–52 NHL season, on February 17, 1952 against the Boston Bruins. He also played two games in the American Hockey League for the St. Louis Flyers. He played two seasons for the Fort Wayne Komets of the International Hockey League before opting to enroll at the University of Michigan and played for their Wolverines for the next two years. He was selected for the NCAA West First All-American Team in 1955. He returned to hockey in 1957 for a season in England with the Wembley Lions before retiring for good in 1958. He died in 2017 at the age of 84.

== Career statistics ==
=== Regular season and playoffs ===
			Regular season					Playoffs
Season	Team	League	GP	G	A	Pts	PIM	GP	G	A	Pts	PIM
1947–48	Ottawa St. Pats	OCJHL	20	3	9	12	6	2	0	0	0	0
1948–49	St. Michael's Majors	OHA	16	0	0	0	14	—	—	—	—	—
1949–50	Galt Black Hawks	OHA	42	2	4	6	65	—	—	—	—	—
1950–51	Galt Black Hawks	OHA	52	6	15	21	86	3	0	3	3	7
1951–52	Chicago Black Hawks	NHL	1	0	0	0	0	—	—	—	—	—
1951–52	Galt Black Hawks	OHA	46	15	25	40	98	3	0	1	1	4
1951–52	St. Louis Flyers	AHL	2	0	0	0	0	—	—	—	—	—
1952–53	Fort Wayne Komets	IHL	43	2	6	8	80	—	—	—	—	—
1953–54	Fort Wayne Komets	IHL	39	1	10	11	62	—	—	—	—	—
1954–55	University of Michigan	WICHL	—	3	7	10	48	—	—	—	—	—
1955–56	University of Michigan	WICHL	—	0	1	1	18	—	—	—	—	—
1957–58	Wembley Lions	BNL	22	2	7	9	32	—	—	—	—	—
IHL totals			82	3	16	19	142	—	—	—	—	—
NHL totals			1	0	0	0	0	—	—	—	—	—

== Awards and honors ==
Award	Year
AHCA All-American	1954–55
NCAA All-Tournament Second Team	1955

== See also ==
- List of players who played only one game in the NHL
