= NCAA Division I men's ice hockey All-Tournament team =

Ice hockey All-Tournament team

NCAA All-Tournament team is an honor bestowed at the conclusion of the NCAA Division I ice hockey tournament to the players judged to have performed the best during the championship. The team is currently composed of three forwards, two defensemen and one goaltender with additional players named in the event of a tie. Voting for the honor was conducted by the head coaches of each member team once the tournament has completed and any player regardless of their team's finish is eligible.

The All-Tournament Team began being awarded after the first championship in 1948 along with an All-Tournament Second-Team. The second team was dropped after the 1969 tournament and it has remained a single team ever since except for 1976 when no team was selected. In recent years the regional tournaments have begun to name all-tournament teams of their own, making the NCAA All-Tournament team draw only from the teams and performances in the Frozen Four.

In two years (1973 and 1992) some players who were voted onto the All-Tournament team played for schools that had their participation in the championship vacated and are no longer officially recognized with the honor but have been included here for historical reference. Vacated appearances are not included in team totals.

== All-Tournament teams ==
=== 1940s ===
1948
Player	Pos	Team
Bernie Burke	G	Boston College
Connie Hill	D	Michigan
Ron Newson	D	Colorado College
Wally Grant	F	Michigan
Bill Riley	F	Dartmouth
Joe Riley	F	Dartmouth

1949
Player	Pos	Team
Dick Desmond	G	Dartmouth
Ed Songin	D	Boston College
Mike Thayer	D	Dartmouth
Wally Grant	F	Michigan
Jack Mulhern	F	Boston College
Joe Riley	F	Dartmouth

=== 1950s ===
1950
Player	Pos	Team
Ralph Bevins	G	Boston University
Ross Smith	D	Michigan
Jim Starrak	D	Colorado College
Bill Anderson	F	Boston University
Tony Frasca	F	Colorado College
Jack Garrity	F	Boston University

1951
Player	Pos	Team
Donald Whiston	G	Brown
Bob Heathcott	D	Michigan
Jim Starrak	D	Colorado College
Gil Burford	F	Michigan
Neil Celley	F	Michigan
John Matchefts	F	Michigan

1952
Player	Pos	Team
Ken Kinsley	G	Colorado College
Jim Haas	D	Michigan
Len Maccini	D	Colorado College
George Chin	F	Michigan
John McKennell	F	Michigan
Doug Philpott	F	Michigan

1953
Player	Pos	Team
Jim Mattson	G	Minnesota
Alex MacLellan	D	Michigan
Tom Wegleitner	D	Minnesota
John Matchefts	F	Michigan
Dick Meredith	F	Minnesota
Abbie Moore	F	Rensselaer

1954
Player	Pos	Team
Bob Fox	G	Rensselaer
Jim Pope	D	Rensselaer
Ken Yackel	D	Minnesota
Frank Chiarelli	F	Rensselaer
John Mayasich	F	Minnesota
Gordie Peterkin	F	Rensselaer

1955
Player	Pos	Team
Lorne Howes	G	Michigan
Phil Hilton	D	Colorado College
Doug Silverberg	D	Colorado College
Bill Cleary	F	Harvard
Bill MacFarland	F	Michigan
Tom Rendall	F	Michigan

1956
Player	Pos	Team
Lorne Howes	G	Michigan
Bob Pitts	D	Michigan
Bob Schiller	D	Michigan
Pete Aubry	F	Michigan Tech
Tom Rendall	F	Michigan
Ed Switzer	F	Michigan

1957
Player	Pos	Team
Eddie MacDonald	G	Clarkson
Bob Pitts	D	Michigan
Don Wishart	D	Colorado College
Bill Hay	F	Colorado College
Bob McCusker	F	Colorado College
Tom Rendall	F	Michigan

1958
Player	Pos	Team
Rodney Schneck	G	Denver
Bill Steenson	D	North Dakota
Ed Zemrau	D	Denver
Murray Massier	F	Denver
Bob Van Lammers	F	Clarkson
Jim Brown	F	Denver

1959
Player	Pos	Team
Joe Selinger	G	Michigan State
Joe Jangro	D	Boston College
Pat Presley	D	St. Lawrence
Reg Morelli	F	North Dakota
Bill MacKenzie	F	Michigan State
Ed Thomlinson	F	North Dakota

=== 1960s ===
1960
Player	Pos	Team
Barry Urbanski	G	Boston University
Marty Howe	D	Denver
George Konik	D	Denver
Lou Angotti	F	Michigan Tech
Paul Coppo	F	Michigan Tech
Bob Marquis	F	Boston University

1961
Player	Pos	Team
Mike Larson	G	Minnesota
Marty Howe	D	Denver
Grant Munro	D	Denver
Trent Beatty	F	Denver
Bill Masterton	F	Denver
Jerry Walker	F	Denver

1962
Player	Pos	Team
Richie Broadbelt	G	St. Lawrence
Henry Åkervall	D	Michigan Tech
Elov Seger	D	Michigan Tech
Lou Angotti	F	Michigan Tech
Red Berenson	F	Michigan
John Ivanitz	F	Michigan Tech

1963
Player	Pos	Team
Tom Apprille	G	Boston College
George Goodacre	D	North Dakota
Don Ross	D	North Dakota
Al McLean	F	North Dakota
Dave Merrifield	F	North Dakota
Don Stokaluk	F	North Dakota

1964
Player	Pos	Team
Bob Gray	G	Michigan
Tom Polanic	D	Michigan
Wayne Smith	D	Denver
Andy Herrebout	F	Denver
Bill Staub	F	Denver
Gordon Wilkie	F	Michigan

1965
Player	Pos	Team
Tony Esposito	G	Michigan Tech
Dennis Huculak	D	Michigan Tech
Pete Leiman	D	Michigan Tech
John Cunniff	F	Boston College
Gary Milroy	F	Michigan Tech
Wayne Weller	F	Michigan Tech

1966
Player	Pos	Team
Gaye Cooley	G	Michigan State
Don Heaphy	D	Michigan State
Wayne Smith	D	Denver
Mike Coppo	F	Michigan State
Tom Hurley	F	Clarkson
Brian McAndrew	F	Michigan State

1967
Player	Pos	Team
Ken Dryden	G	Cornell
Harry Orr	D	Cornell
Skip Stanowski	D	Cornell
Mike Doran	F	Cornell
Tom Mikkola	F	Michigan State
Jim Quinn	F	Boston University

1968
Player	Pos	Team
Gerry Powers	G	Denver
Terry Abram	D	North Dakota
Keith Magnuson	D	Denver
Brian Cornell	F	Cornell
Bob Munro	F	North Dakota
Bob Trembecky	F	Denver

1969
Player	Pos	Team
Gerry Powers	G	Denver
Keith Magnuson	D	Denver
Bruce Pattison	D	Cornell
Brian Cornell	F	Cornell
Tom Miller	F	Denver
Bob Trembecky	F	Denver

=== 1970s ===
1970
Player	Pos	Team
Bruce Bullock	G	Clarkson
Steve Giuliani	D	Cornell
Dan Lodboa	D	Cornell
John Hughes	F	Cornell
Rick Magnusson	F	Clarkson
Bob Poffenroth	F	Wisconsin

1971
Player	Pos	Team
Dan Brady	G	Boston University
Bob Brown	D	Boston University
Bruce McIntosh	D	Minnesota
Dean Blais	F	Minnesota
Don Cahoon	F	Boston University
Steve Stirling	F	Boston University

1972
Player	Pos	Team
Tim Regan	G	Boston University
Bob Brown	D	Boston University
Ric Jordan	D	Boston University
John Danby	F	Boston University
Dave Westner	F	Cornell
Gary Winchester	F	Wisconsin

1973
Player	Pos	Team
Jim Makey	G	Wisconsin
Bruce Affleck*	D	Denver
John Taft	D	Wisconsin
Stan Hinkley	F	Wisconsin
Peter McNab*	F	Denver
Dean Talafous	F	Wisconsin

1974
Player	Pos	Team
Brad Shelstad	G	Minnesota
Les Auge	D	Minnesota
Jim Nahrgang	D	Michigan Tech
Steve Jensen	F	Michigan Tech
Jim McMahon	F	Harvard
Mike Polich	F	Minnesota

1975
Player	Pos	Team
Jim Warden	G	Michigan Tech
Reed Larson	D	Minnesota
Bob Lorimer	D	Michigan Tech
Bob D'Alvise	F	Michigan Tech
Steve Jensen	F	Michigan Tech
Warren Miller	F	Minnesota

1976
No Team Selected

1977
Player	Pos	Team
Julian Baretta	G	Wisconsin
Craig Norwich	D	Wisconsin
John Taft	D	Wisconsin
Dave Debol	F	Michigan
Rick Meagher	F	Boston University
Dave Silk	F	Boston University

1978
Player	Pos	Team
Paul Skidmore	G	Boston College
Dick Lamby	D	Boston University
Jack O'Callahan	D	Boston University
Mark Fidler	F	Boston University
Joe Mullen	F	Boston College
Dave Silk	F	Boston University

1979
Player	Pos	Team
Steve Janaszak	G	Minnesota
Mike Ramsey	D	Minnesota
Howard Walker	D	North Dakota
Steve Christoff	F	Minnesota
Eric Strobel	F	Minnesota
Mark Taylor	F	North Dakota

=== 1980s ===
1980
Player	Pos	Team
Steve Weeks	G	Northern Michigan
Marc Chorney	D	North Dakota
Tom Laidlaw	D	Northern Michigan
Roy Kerling	F	Cornell
Doug Smail	F	North Dakota
Phil Sykes	F	North Dakota

1981
Player	Pos	Team
Marc Behrend	G	Wisconsin
Mike Knoke	D	Minnesota
Tim Watters	D	Michigan Tech
Steve Bozek	F	Northern Michigan
Aaron Broten	F	Minnesota
John Newbery	F	Wisconsin

1982
Player	Pos	Team
Darren Jensen	G	North Dakota
Bruce Driver	D	Wisconsin
James Patrick	D	North Dakota
Cary Eades	F	North Dakota
John Newbery	F	Wisconsin
Phil Sykes	F	North Dakota

1983
Player	Pos	Team
Marc Behrend	G	Wisconsin
Chris Chelios	D	Wisconsin
Mark Fusco	D	Harvard
Patrick Flatley	F	Wisconsin
Scott Fusco	F	Harvard
Paul Houck	F	Wisconsin

1984
Player	Pos	Team
Rick Kosti	G	Minnesota-Duluth
Gary Kruzich	G	Bowling Green
David Ellett	D	Bowling Green
Garry Galley	D	Bowling Green
Dean Barsness	F	North Dakota
Bob Lakso	F	Minnesota-Duluth
Lyle Phair	F	Michigan State

1985
Player	Pos	Team
Chris Terreri	G	Providence
Tim Friday	D	Rensselaer
Ken Hammond	D	Rensselaer
Adam Oates	F	Rensselaer
George Servinis	F	Rensselaer
Bill Watson	F	Minnesota-Duluth

1986
Player	Pos	Team
Norm Foster	G	Michigan State
Mark Benning	D	Harvard
Donald McSween	D	Michigan State
Allen Bourbeau	F	Harvard
Mike Donnelly	F	Michigan State
Jeff Parker	F	Michigan State

1987
Player	Pos	Team
Ed Belfour	G	North Dakota
Ian Kidd	D	North Dakota
Chris Luongo	D	Michigan State
Donald McSween	D	Michigan State
Tony Hrkac	F	North Dakota
Bob Joyce	F	North Dakota
Corey Millen	F	Minnesota

1988
Player	Pos	Team
Bruce Hoffort	G	Lake Superior State
Kord Cernich	D	Lake Superior State
Brian McColgan	D	St. Lawrence
Dave Capuano	F	Maine
Mike de Carle	F	Lake Superior State
Pete Lappin	F	St. Lawrence

1989
Player	Pos	Team
Allain Roy	G	Harvard
Todd Richards	D	Minnesota
Kevin Sneddon	D	Harvard
Jon Anderson	F	Minnesota
Ted Donato	F	Harvard
Lane MacDonald	F	Harvard

=== 1990s ===
1990
Player	Pos	Team
Duane Derksen	G	Wisconsin
Rob Andringa	D	Wisconsin
Mark Osiecki	D	Wisconsin
John Byce	F	Wisconsin
Joel Gardner	F	Colgate
Chris Tancill	F	Wisconsin

1991
Player	Pos	Team
Bill Pye	G	Northern Michigan
Lou Melone	D	Northern Michigan
Brad Werenka	D	Northern Michigan
Tony Amonte	F	Boston University
Scott Beattie	F	Northern Michigan
Jean-Yves Roy	F	Maine

1992
Player	Pos	Team
Darrin Madeley	G	Lake Superior State
Mark Astley	D	Lake Superior State
Barry Richter*	D	Wisconsin
Paul Constantin	F	Lake Superior State
Brian Rolston	F	Lake Superior State
Jason Zent*	F	Wisconsin

1993
Player	Pos	Team
Garth Snow	G	Maine
Chris Imes	D	Maine
Michael Smith	D	Lake Superior State
Paul Kariya	F	Maine
Jim Montgomery	F	Maine
Brian Rolston	F	Lake Superior State

1994
Player	Pos	Team
Blaine Lacher	G	Lake Superior State
Keith Aldridge	D	Lake Superior State
Steven Barnes	D	Lake Superior State
Clayton Beddoes	F	Lake Superior State
Mike Pomichter	F	Boston University
Sean Tallaire	F	Lake Superior State

1995
Player	Pos	Team
Blair Allison	G	Maine
Chris Imes	D	Maine
Kaj Linna	D	Boston University
Shawn Bates	F	Boston University
Chris O'Sullivan	F	Boston University
Dan Shermerhorn	F	Maine

1996
Player	Pos	Team
Marty Turco	G	Michigan
Steven Halko	D	Michigan
Scott Swanson	D	Colorado College
Peter Geronazzo	F	Colorado College
Brendan Morrison	F	Michigan
Martin St. Louis	F	Vermont

1997
Player	Pos	Team
Aaron Schweitzer	G	North Dakota
Curtis Murphy	D	North Dakota
Tom Poti	D	Boston University
Chris Drury	F	Boston University
Matt Henderson	F	North Dakota
David Hoogsteen	F	North Dakota

1998
Player	Pos	Team
Marty Turco	G	Michigan
Bubba Berenzweig	D	Michigan
Mike Mottau	D	Boston College
Mark Kosick	F	Michigan
Josh Langfeld	F	Michigan
Marty Reasoner	F	Boston College

1999
Player	Pos	Team
Alfie Michaud	G	Maine
David Cullen	D	Maine
Jayme Filipowicz	D	New Hampshire
Niko Dimitrakos	F	Maine
Jason Krog	F	New Hampshire
Michael Souza	F	New Hampshire

=== 2000s ===
2000
Player	Pos	Team
Karl Goehring	G	North Dakota
Mike Commodore	D	North Dakota
Mike Mottau	D	Boston College
Jeff Farkas	F	Boston College
Lee Goren	F	North Dakota
Bryan Lundbohm	F	North Dakota

2001
Player	Pos	Team
Scott Clemmensen	G	Boston College
Travis Roche	D	North Dakota
Rob Scuderi	D	Boston College
Chuck Kobasew	F	Boston College
Krys Kolanos	F	Boston College
Bryan Lundbohm	F	North Dakota

2002
Player	Pos	Team
Adam Hauser	G	Minnesota
Michael Schutte	D	Maine
Peter Metcalf	D	Maine
John Pohl	F	Minnesota
Grant Potulny	F	Minnesota
Róbert Liščák	F	Maine

2003
Player	Pos	Team
Travis Weber	G	Minnesota
Paul Martin	D	Minnesota
Matt DeMarchi	D	Minnesota
Steve Saviano	F	New Hampshire
Thomas Vanek	F	Minnesota
Nathan Martz	F	New Hampshire

2004
Player	Pos	Team
Adam Berkhoel	G	Denver
Ryan Caldwell	D	Denver
Prestin Ryan	D	Maine
Junior Lessard	F	Minnesota-Duluth
Dustin Penner	F	Maine
Connor James	F	Denver

2005
Player	Pos	Team
Peter Mannino	G	Denver
Brett Skinner	D	Denver
Matt Carle	D	Denver
Paul Stastny	F	Denver
Travis Zajac	F	North Dakota
Gabe Gauthier	F	Denver

2006
Player	Pos	Team
Brian Elliott	G	Wisconsin
Tom Gilbert	D	Wisconsin
Brett Motherwell	D	Boston College
Adam Burish	F	Wisconsin
Chris Collins	F	Boston College
Robbie Earl	F	Wisconsin

2007
Player	Pos	Team
Jeff Lerg	G	Michigan State
Tyler Howells	D	Michigan State
Brian Boyle	D	Boston College
Tim Kennedy	F	Michigan State
Nathan Gerbe	F	Boston College
Justin Abdelkader	F	Michigan State

2008
Player	Pos	Team
John Muse	G	Boston College
Michael Brennan	D	Boston College
Kyle Lawson	D	Notre Dame
Kevin Deeth	F	Notre Dame
Nathan Gerbe	F	Boston College
Ben Smith	F	Boston College

2009
Player	Pos	Team
Kieran Millan	G	Boston University
Colby Cohen	D	Boston University
Kevin Roeder	D	Miami
Nick Bonino	F	Boston University
Colin Wilson	F	Boston University
Tommy Wingels	F	Miami

=== 2010s ===
2010
Player	Pos	Team
John Muse	G	Boston College
Brian Dumoulin	D	Boston College
Brendan Smith	D	Wisconsin
Cam Atkinson	F	Boston College
Ben Smith	F	Boston College
Joe Whitney	F	Boston College

2011
Player	Pos	Team
Shawn Hunwick	G	Michigan
Justin Faulk	D	Minnesota-Duluth
Jon Merrill	D	Michigan
Kyle Schmidt	F	Minnesota-Duluth
J. T. Brown	F	Minnesota-Duluth
Ben Winnett	F	Michigan

2012
Player	Pos	Team
Parker Milner	G	Boston College
Brian Dumoulin	D	Boston College
Chad Billins	D	Ferris State
Kyle Bonis	F	Ferris State
Paul Carey	F	Boston College
Steven Whitney	F	Boston College

2013
Player	Pos	Team
Jeff Malcom	G	Yale
Zach Davies	D	Quinnipiac
Gus Young	D	Yale
Clinton Bourbonais	F	Yale
Andrew Miller	F	Yale
Jordan Samuels-Thomas	F	Quinnipiac

2014
Player	Pos	Team
Colin Stevens	G	Union
Mat Bodie	D	Union
Shayne Gostisbehere	D	Union
Daniel Ciampini	F	Union
Kyle Rau	F	Minnesota
Sam Warning	F	Minnesota

2015
Player	Pos	Team
Jon Gillies	G	Providence
Anthony Florentino	D	Providence
Matt Grzelcyk	D	Boston University
Ahti Oskanen	F	Boston University
Mark Jankowski	F	Providence
Jack Eichel	F	Boston University

2016
Player	Pos	Team
Cam Johnson	G	North Dakota
Troy Stecher	D	North Dakota
Connor Clifton	D	Quinnipiac
Drake Caggiula	F	North Dakota
Brock Boeser	F	North Dakota
Travis St. Denis	F	Quinnipiac

2017
Player	Pos	Team
Tanner Jaillet	G	Denver
Will Butcher	D	Denver
Neal Pionk	D	Minnesota-Duluth
Alex Iafallo	F	Minnesota-Duluth
Jarid Lukosevicius	F	Denver
Troy Terry	F	Denver

2018
Player	Pos	Team
Hunter Shepard	G	Minnesota-Duluth
Scott Perunovich	D	Minnesota-Duluth
Jordan Gross	D	Notre Dame
Karson Kuhlman	F	Minnesota-Duluth
Jared Thomas	F	Minnesota-Duluth
Andrew Oglevie	F	Notre Dame

2019
Player	Pos	Team
Hunter Shepard	G	Minnesota-Duluth
Mikey Anderson	D	Minnesota-Duluth
Marc Del Gaizo	D	Massachusetts
Parker Mackay	F	Minnesota-Duluth
Justin Richards	F	Minnesota-Duluth
Billy Exell	F	Minnesota-Duluth

=== 2020s ===
2020
Not awarded due to the COVID-19 pandemic

2021
Player	Pos	Team
Filip Lindberg	G	Massachusetts
Zac Jones	D	Massachusetts
Matthew Kessel	D	Massachusetts
Nathan Smith	F	Minnesota State
Bobby Trivigno	F	Massachusetts
Nolan Walker	F	St. Cloud State

2022
Player	Pos	Team
Magnus Chrona	G	Denver
Mike Benning	D	Denver
Jack McNeely	D	Minnesota State
Carter Savoie	F	Denver
Ryan Barrow	F	Denver
Sam Morton	F	Minnesota State

2023
Player	Pos	Team
Yaniv Perets	G	Quinnipiac
Zach Metsa	D	Quinnipiac
Luke Mittelstadt	D	Minnesota
Logan Cooley	F	Minnesota
Collin Graf	F	Quinnipiac
Jacob Quillan	F	Quinnipiac

2024
Player	Pos	Team
Matt Davis	G	Denver
Sean Behrens	D	Denver
Zeev Buium	D	Denver
Tristan Broz	F	Denver
Rieger Lorenz	F	Denver
Will Smith	F	Boston College

2025
Player	Pos	Team
Hampton Slukynsky	G	Western Michigan
Zeev Buium	D	Denver
Joona Vaisanen	D	Western Michigan
Cole Eiserman	F	Boston University
Owen Michaels	F	Western Michigan
Tim Washe	F	Western Michigan

2026
Player	Pos	Team
Johnny Hicks	G	Denver
Ben Dexheimer	D	Wisconsin
Boston Buckberger	D	Denver
Kyle Chyzowski	F	Denver
Rieger Lorenz	F	Denver
Vasily Zelenov	F	Wisconsin

* Player is no longer officially considered as part of the All-Tournament Team

=== All-Tournament team players by school ===
School	Recipients
Denver	48
North Dakota	39
Michigan	36
Boston University	35
Boston College	34
Minnesota	33
Wisconsin	29
Michigan Tech	19
Michigan State	18
Minnesota-Duluth	18
Maine	17
Lake Superior State	14
Colorado College	13
Cornell	12
Harvard	10
Rensselaer	9
Quinnipiac	8
Northern Michigan	7
Clarkson	5
Dartmouth	5
Massachusetts	5
New Hampshire	5
Notre Dame	4
Providence	4
St. Lawrence	4
Union	4
Western Michigan	4
Yale	4
Bowling Green	3
Minnesota State	3
Ferris State	2
Miami	2
Brown	1
Colgate	1
St. Cloud State	1
Vermont	1

=== Multiple appearances ===
Player	All-Tournament team appearances
Tom Rendall	3
Lou Angotti	2
Marc Behrend	2
Bob Brown	2
Zeev Buium	2
Brian Cornell	2
Brian Dumoulin	2
Nathan Gerbe	2
Wally Grant	2
Lorne Howes	2
Chris Imes	2
Steve Jensen	2
Bryan Lundbohm	2
Keith Magnuson	2
John Matchefts	2
Donald McSween	2
Mike Mottau	2
John Muse	2
John Newbery	2
Bob Pitts	2
Gerry Powers	2
Joe Riley	2
Hunter Shepard	2
Dave Silk	2
Ben Smith	2
Wayne Smith	2
Jim Starrak	2
Phil Sykes	2
John Taft	2
Bob Trembecky	2
Marty Turco	2

== Second Teams ==
=== 1940s ===
1948
Player	Pos	Team
Dick Desmond	G	Dartmouth
Ross Smith	D	Michigan
Ed Songin	D	Boston College
Wally Gacek	F	Michigan
Bruce Stewart	F	Colorado College
Joe Slattery	F	Colorado College

1949
Player	Pos	Team
Bernie Burke	G	Boston College
Ron Newson	D	Colorado College
Lew Meier	D	Colorado College
Bill Riley	F	Dartmouth
Wally Gacek	F	Michigan
Connie Hill	F	Michigan

=== 1950s ===
1950
Player	Pos	Team
Roy Ikola	G	Colorado College
Ed Songin	D	Boston College
Joe Foligno	D	Boston University
Jack Mulhern	F	Boston College
Wally Grant	F	Michigan
Ron Hartwell	F	Colorado College

1951
Player	Pos	Team
Hal Downes	G	Michigan
Jim Sutherland	D	Brown
John Murphy	D	Brown
Jack Garrity	F	Boston University
Al Gubbins	F	Brown
Omer Brandt	F	Colorado College

1952
Player	Pos	Team
Paul Cruikshank	G	Yale
Steve Leolich	D	Colorado College
Reggie Shave	D	Michigan
Earl Keyes	F	Michigan
Wally Kilrea Jr.	F	Yale
Omer Brandt	F	Colorado College

1953
Player	Pos	Team
Willard Ikola	G	Michigan
Herb LaFontaine	D	Rensselaer
Reggie Shave	D	Michigan
John Mayasich	F	Minnesota
George Chin	F	Michigan
Frank Chiarelli	F	Rensselaer

1954
Player	Pos	Team
Jim Mattson	G	Minnesota
Jim Haas	D	Michigan
Bob Siblo	D	Boston College
Abbie Moore	F	Rensselaer
Bill MacFarland	F	Michigan
Richard Dougherty	F	Minnesota

1955
Player	Pos	Team
Bill Sloan	G	St. Lawrence
Bob Schiller	D	Michigan
Mike Buchanan	D	Michigan
Clare Smith	F	Colorado College
Ken Smith	F	Colorado College
Dick Dunnigan	F	Michigan

1956
Player	Pos	Team
Sarge Whittier	G	St. Lawrence
Bill Renner	D	St. Lawrence
Willie Tattersall	D	Michigan Tech
Cliff Wylie	F	Michigan Tech
Ron Stenlund	F	Michigan Tech
Joe McLean	F	St. Lawrence

1957
Player	Pos	Team
Ross Childs	G	Michigan
Dick McGhee	D	Colorado College
Bob Schiller	D	Michigan
Bob McVey	F	Harvard
Dick Dunnigan	F	Michigan
John Andrews	F	Colorado College

1958
Player	Pos	Team
Eddie MacDonald	G	Clarkson
Blair Livingstone	D	Denver
Ralph Lyndon	D	North Dakota
Barry Sharp	F	Denver
Ron King	F	North Dakota
John MacMillan	F	Denver

1959
Player	Pos	Team
Jim Logue	G	Boston College
Ralph Lyndon	D	North Dakota
Ed Pollesel	D	Michigan State
Larry Langill	F	St. Lawrence
Tom Mustonen	F	Michigan State
Joe Poole	F	North Dakota

=== 1960s ===
1960
Player	Pos	Team
George Kirkwood	G	Denver
Henry Akervall	D	Michigan Tech
Pat Enright	D	Boston University
Terry Slater	F	St. Lawrence
John MacMillan	F	Denver
John Kosiancic	F	Michigan Tech

1961
Player	Pos	Team
George Kirkwood	G	Denver
George Konik	D	Denver
Arlie Parker	D	St. Lawrence
Terry Slater	F	St. Lawrence
Jim Josephson	F	Rensselaer
Ron Constantine	F	Minnesota

1962
Player	Pos	Team
Garry Bauman	G	Michigan Tech
Cal Wagner	D	Clarkson
Don Rodgers	D	Michigan
Jerry Sullivan	F	Michigan Tech
Larry Babcock	F	Michigan
Hal Pettersen	F	Clarkson

1963
Player	Pos	Team
Wayne Gibbons	G	Clarkson
Jim Kenning	D	Denver
Maurice Roberge	D	North Dakota
Jack Leetch	F	Boston College
Corby Adams	F	Clarkson
Bob Hamill	F	Denver

1964
Player	Pos	Team
Bob Bellemore	G	Providence
Jim Kenning	D	Denver
Larry Kish	D	Providence
Barry MacDonald	D	Michigan
Mel Wakabayashi	F	Michigan
Jerry Knightley	F	Rensselaer
Jack Cole	F	Michigan

1965
Player	Pos	Team
Pat Murphy	G	Boston College
Roy Davidson	D	North Dakota
Ralph Toran	D	Boston College
Gerry Kell	F	North Dakota
Bob Stoyko	F	North Dakota
Dennis Macks	F	Brown

1966
Player	Pos	Team
Terry Yurkiewicz	G	Clarkson
Pete McLachlan	D	Boston University
Bob Brawley	D	Michigan State
Tom Mikkola	F	Michigan State
John McLennan	F	Clarkson
Lyle Bradley	F	Denver

1967
Player	Pos	Team
Wayne Ryan	G	Boston University
Pete McLachlan	D	Boston University
Brian Gilmour	D	Boston University
Doug Ferguson	F	Cornell
Dave Ferguson	F	Cornell
Brian McAndrew	F	Michigan State

1968
Player	Pos	Team
Ken Dryden	G	Cornell
Tim Gould	D	Denver
Terry Ogden	D	North Dakota
Dave Kartio	F	North Dakota
Jim Wiste	F	Denver
Tom Gilmour	F	Denver

1969
Player	Pos	Team
Ken Dryden	G	Cornell
Tim Gould	D	Denver
Steve Giuliani	D	Cornell
Al Karlander	F	Michigan Tech
Ron Mark	F	Harvard
Peter Tufford	F	Cornell

=== All-Tournament Second Team players by school ===
School	Recipients
Michigan	24
Denver	15
Colorado College	13
North Dakota	10
Boston College	9
Michigan Tech	8
St. Lawrence	8
Boston University	7
Clarkson	7
Cornell	6
Michigan State	5
Rensselaer	5
Brown	4
Minnesota	4
Dartmouth	2
Harvard	2
Providence	2
Yale	2

=== Multiple appearances ===
Player	Second Team appearances
Omer Brandt	2
Ken Dryden	2
Dick Dunnigan	2
Wally Gacek	2
Tim Gould	2
Jim Kenning	2
George Kirkwood	2
Ralph Lyndon	2
Pete McLachlan	2
John McMillan	2
Bob Schiller	2
Reggie Shave	2
Terry Slater	2
Ed Songin	2
