= Bill Sloan =

Canadian ice hockey player (1934–2022)

- Born: June 9, 1934 Cornwall, Ontario, Canada
- Died: May 24, 2022 (aged 87) Potsdam, New York, U.S.
- Position: Goaltender
- Played for: St. Lawrence
- Playing career: 1952–1956

William Nichol Sloan (June 9, 1934 – May 24, 2022) was a Canadian-born American ice hockey goaltender who previous had the most career wins in NCAA history.

== Biography ==
Bill Sloan arrived in Canton, New York, in the fall of 1952, less than 60 miles from his home town, and immediately made the varsity squad at St. Lawrence. Despite the NCAA's rules limiting athletes to three years of eligibility at the time, the Larries were in need of a goalie and Sloan fit the bill. He helped SLU to a 12–6 record in his first season, earning the first shutout for the Saints in five years. The following year Sloan improved mightily, finishing the year with an 18–3–1 record and helped the Saints tie for the Tri-State League championship. Despite their stellar record, Rensselaer was chosen for the 1954 tournament instead, to the surprise of many. Sloan was selected as an AHCA Second Team All-American for his remarkable season.

Sloan was a model of consistency in net for the Saints in his third season, providing the Larries with all the goaltending they needed to produce a 19–3–1 record. The Saints won the Tri-State League outright and were selected for the NCAA tournament. They faced one of the best offenses in the nation in the semifinal but Sloan held Colorado College to 2 goals, unfortunately, St. Lawrence could only manage 1 of their own and they were sent to the consolation game. Perhaps still disappointed with how close they came the night before, St. Lawrence finished with its worst performance on the season, losing 3–6 to Harvard. Sloan was again an All-American and made the All-Tournament Second Team.

In his senior season, Sloan saved the best for last; in 20 games he allowed just 37 goals and backstopped St. Lawrence to another league championship. However, because Sloan was in his 4th year of varsity play he was unable to suit up for the Saints during the 1956 tournament and was forced to watch his team finish in 3rd place, though they did receive a valiant effort from backup Sarge Whittier. At the end of his collegiate career Sloan was the All-time leader in wins for the NCAA with 65. He retained the record until he was passed by both Ken Dryden and Gerry Powers in 1969. Sloan still holds numerous program records including wins, winning percentage (.776), shutouts (9), shutout streak (201:52) and is the only three-time All-American in program history.

After graduating, Bill married his wife Mandy and the two settled in Potsdam, New York. Sloan began teaching mathematics at the local high school as well as coaching the boys hockey team. In 1959, he returned to the college ranks and became a professor of mathematics at SUNY Potsdam. Sloan worked in various capacities for the University for more than 35 years and was instrumental in starting the school's women's ice hockey team.

Sloan became a naturalized American citizen in 1963. He was inducted into both the Cornwall Sports Hall of Fame (1972) and the St. Lawrence Athletic Hall of Fame (1985).

Sloan died in Potsdam, New York, on May 24, 2022, at the age of 87.

== Statistics ==
=== Regular season and playoffs ===
			Regular season									Playoffs
Season	Team	League	GP	W	L	T	MIN	GA	SO	GAA	SV%	GP	W	L	MIN	GA	SO	GAA	SV%
1952–53	St. Lawrence	Tri-State League	18	12	6	0	1058	50	1	2.83	.894	—	—	—	—	—	—	—	—
1953–54	St. Lawrence	Tri-State League	22	18	3	1	1265	56	3	2.66	.908	—	—	—	—	—	—	—	—
1954–55	St. Lawrence	Tri-State League	25	19	5	1	1466	63	1	2.58	.898	—	—	—	—	—	—	—	—
1955–56	St. Lawrence	Tri-State League	20	16	4	0	1049	37	4	2.12	.912	—	—	—	—	—	—	—	—
NCAA totals			85	65	18	2	4834	206	9	2.55	.902	—	—	—	—	—	—	—	—

== Awards and honors ==
Award	Year
AHCA Second Team All-American	1953–54
AHCA First Team All-American	1954–55
NCAA All-Tournament Second Team	1955
AHCA Second Team All-American	1955–56
