= Tom Yurkovich =

American ice hockey player (1935–2023)

- Born: September 29, 1935 Eveleth, Minnesota, U.S.
- Died: April 9, 2023 (aged 87) Globe, Arizona, U.S.
- Height: 5 ft 11 in (180 cm)
- Weight: 175 lb (79 kg; 12 st 7 lb)
- Position: Goaltender
- Caught: Left
- National team: United States
- Playing career: 1954–1969

Thomas Michael Yurkovich (September 29, 1935 – April 9, 2023) was an American ice hockey goaltender and Olympian.

Yurkovich played with Team USA at the 1964 Winter Olympics held in Innsbruck, Austria. He played for the University of North Dakota and for the Rochester Mustangs of the United States Hockey League.

Yurkovich died on April 9, 2023, at the age of 87.

== Awards and honours ==
Award	Year
All-WIHL Second Team	1956–57
