= Philip Hilton =

English cricketer (1840–1906)

Personal information
- Born: 10 March 1840; Selling, Kent
- Died: 26 May 1906 (aged 66); St Pancras, London
- Batting: Right-handed

Domestic team information
- Years: Team
- 1865–1873: Kent
- FC debut: 27 July 1865 Kent v Sussex
- Last FC: 30 July 1874 Marylebone Cricket Club (MCC) v Notts

Career statistics
Competition	First-class
Matches	33
Runs scored	621
Batting average	11.29
100s/50s	0/1
Top score	74
Catches/stumpings	19/–
- Source: Cricinfo, 4 July 2020

Philip Hilton (10 March 1840 – 26 May 1906) was an English cricketer. He played 33 first-class cricket matches between 1865 and 1874. He was a regular club cricketer and was on the management committee of Kent County Cricket Club, for whom he played 26 of his senior matches.

== Early life ==
Hilton was born at Selling near Faversham in Kent in 1840, the son of Charles and Anna Hilton. His father farmed near Selling and worked as a merchant, occupations which were profitable enough to allow him to educate his son at Cheltenham College. Hilton did not play cricket for the school, but was a keen sportsman throughout his life, playing association football and fox hunting as well as cricket.

== Cricket ==
A regular cricketer who played club cricket at Selling, Gravesend and Hundred of Hoo, Hilton played in 33 first-class matches. He made his first-class debut in 1865, playing for Kent against Sussex at Gravesend. He played regularly for Kent until 1868 and then in 1871 as well as making appearances for the Gentlemen of Kent, Gentlemen of the South, and teams assembled by W. G. Grace in first-class cricket.

Hilton was a batsman and considered a good mid wicket fielder. Writing in Scores and Biographies Arthur Haygarth was of the opinion that Hilton had "not been chosen as often for his county as his merits deserve" although in 26 first-class matches for the county team he only once scored a half-century, making 74 runs against Surrey at The Oval in 1871. His final two first-class matches were for Marylebone Cricket Club (MCC) against Nottinghamshire in 1874. He played club cricket until at least 1890, including for MCC, Band of Brothers and Incogniti, whom he captained regularly.

Hilton was first elected to the Kent management committee in 1866 and served as Treasurer between 1867 and the reorganisation of the club in 1870. He was re-elected to the committee in 1873 and remained on it until "financial trouble" led to his resignation in 1892. From 1884 he acted as the club's first second XI captain.

== Family and later life ==
Living most of his life at Lower Upnor on the Hoo Peninsula, Hilton was the Master of the Hounds at the Hundred of Hoo Harriers and had a long association with fox hunting in Kent. He married Alice Matthews in 1874; the couple had nine children.

Hilton suffered from stomach cancer at the end of his life and died in a nursing home at St Pancras in London in 1906. He was aged 66.

== Bibliography ==
- Carlaw, Derek (2020). Kent County Cricketers, A to Z: Part One (1806–1914) (PDF). Cardiff: ACS.
