= Phil Hilton =

Canadian ice hockey player

- Born: 1932 (age 93–94) Brandon, Manitoba, Canada
- Position: Defenseman
- Played for: Brandon Wheat Kings; Colorado College
- Playing career: 1952–1955

Phil Hilton is a Canadian retired ice hockey defenseman who was the Most Outstanding Player for the 1955 NCAA tournament.

== Career ==
Hilton ended his junior career with his home town Brandon Wheat Kings in 1952 and immediately jumped into the college hockey ranks. He appeared as a freshman for Colorado College (a rarity at the time) and tried to build on CC's runner-up finish the year before. Unfortunately the Tigers halved the win total and finished towards the bottom of the conference standings. The team started to recover in Hilton's second season, a year that saw him being named to the All-WIHL Second Team.

In his final year with the team, Hilton helped Colorado College finish atop the league standings and earn the top seed in the NCAA tournament. He was named as an AHCA Second Team All-American and was First-Team All-conference in the process. Hilton helped shut down St. Lawrence in the semifinal, allowing CC to reach the championship game. Against long-time rival Michigan, Hilton opened the scoring for the Tigers but could not stop the Wolverines from responding to each CC goal with a score of their own. Michigan won the championship but, in recognition of his play in the tournament, Hilton was named to the All-Tournament First Team and was awarded with the Tournament MOP.

== Awards and honors ==
Award	Year
All-WIHL Second Team	1953–54
All-WIHL First Team	1954–55
AHCA Second Team All-American	1954–55
NCAA All-Tournament First Team	1955

Awards and achievements
Preceded by Abbie Moore	NCAA Tournament Most Outstanding Player; 1955	Succeeded by Lorne Howes
