= 1956 NCAA men's ice hockey tournament =

College ice hockey tournament

- Teams: 4
- Finals site: Broadmoor Ice Palace, Colorado Springs, Colorado
- Champions: Michigan Wolverines (6th title)
- Runner-up: Michigan Tech Huskies (1st title game)
- Semifinalists: St. Lawrence Saints (3rd Frozen Four); Boston College Eagles (5th Frozen Four)
- Winning coach: Vic Heyliger (6th title)
- MOP: Lorne Howes (Michigan)

The 1956 NCAA Men's Ice Hockey Tournament was the culmination of the 1955–56 NCAA Division I men's ice hockey season, the ninth such tournament in NCAA history. It was held between March 15 and 17, 1956, and concluded with Michigan defeating Michigan Tech 7–5. All games were played at the Broadmoor Ice Palace in Colorado Springs, Colorado.

Vic Heyliger captured his 6th and final National title with the Wolverines, all done in the first 9 years of the tournament. As of 2016 he stands as the coach with the most championships overall and the most with one team (6).

== Qualifying teams ==
Four teams qualified for the tournament, two each from the eastern and western regions. The two best WIHL teams and a Tri-State League representative received bids into the tournament as did one independent school.

Clarkson, who had completed a 23–0 record in the regular season, were offered a bid by the selection committee. The Golden Knights, however, had 8 four-year seniors on the team (who would not have been allowed to play in the tournament) and declined the invitation, leaving the second place team from the Tri-State League to go in their stead.

East							West						
Seed	School	Conference	Record	Berth type	Appearance	Last bid	Seed	School	Conference	Record	Berth type	Appearance	Last bid
1	Boston College	Independent	14–5–0	At-Large	5th	1954	1	Michigan	WIHL	18–2–1	At-Large	9th	1955
2	St. Lawrence	Tri-State League	17–4–0	At-Large	3rd	1955	2	Michigan Tech	WIHL	20–6–0	At-Large	1st	Never

== Format ==
The eastern team judged as better was seeded as the top eastern team while the WIHL champion was given the top western seed. The second eastern seed was slotted to play the top western seed and vice versa. All games were played at the Broadmoor Ice Palace. All matches were Single-game eliminations with the semifinal winners advancing to the national championship game and the losers playing in a consolation game.

== Bracket ==
Semifinals; March 15–16
E1	Boston College	4
W2	Michigan Tech	10
W1	Michigan	2*
E2	St. Lawrence	1

National championship March 17
W2	Michigan Tech	5
W1	Michigan	7
Third-place game
E1	Boston College	2
E2	St. Lawrence	6

Note: * denotes overtime period(s)

=== Semifinals ===
==== Boston College vs. Michigan Tech ====
March 15	Boston College	4 – 10	Michigan Tech	Broadmoor Ice Palace

==== Michigan vs. St. Lawrence ====
March 16	Michigan	2 – 1	OT	St. Lawrence	Broadmoor Ice Palace	Recap
No Scoring		First period
		Second period		19:52 - Bernie McKinnon (unassisted)
(McDonald, Pitts) Ed Switzer - 03:59		Third period
(McIntosh) Tom Rendall - GW - 01:21		First overtime period		No scoring
Lorne Howes		Goalie stats		Sarge Whittier

=== Consolation Game ===
==== Boston College vs. St. Lawrence ====
March 17	Boston College	2 – 6	St. Lawrence	Broadmoor Ice Palace	Recap
(Cassidy) Francis Quinn - 06:33 (unassisted) Bill Leary - 11:16		First period	07:03 - Bernie McKinnon (Coluccio, Henry)
No scoring		Second period	06:22 - Joe McLean (unassisted); 07:14 - William Brown (Bigelow); 07:17 - Bill Renner (Stitt, Riopelle)
No scoring		Third period	01:21 - Ron O'Brien (unassisted); 03:47 - Bernie McKinnon (Coluccio, Morrison)

=== Championship Game ===
==== Michigan vs. Michigan Tech ====
March 17	Michigan	7 – 5	Michigan Tech	Broadmoor Ice Palace

Scoring summary
Period	Team	Goal	Assist(s)	Time	Score
1st	UM	Ed Switzer	McDonald	00:23	1–0 UM
1st	MTU	Dick Wilson	J. McManus	02:42	1–1
1st	UM	Neil McDonald	Schiller	09:22	2–1 UM
1st	UM	Don McIntosh	Rendall	10:14	3–1 UM
1st	MTU	Pete Aubry – PP	unassisted	11:04	3–2 UM
1st	UM	Bob Schiller – PP	McDonald	13:11	4–2 UM
1st	MTU	Dick Wilson	unassisted	19:45	4–3 UM
2nd	MTU	Tom Kennedy – SH	Wilson	24:47	4–4
2nd	MTU	Pete Aubry – PP	Wilson	27:25	5–4 MTU
2nd	UM	Ed Switzer	Hanna	27:58	5–5
2nd	UM	Ed Switzer – GW PP	Dunnigan	34:28	6–5 UM
2nd	UM	Neil McDonald	unassisted	34:49	7–5 UM
3rd	No scoring				
Penalty summary
Period	Team	Player	Penalty	Time	PIM
1st	UM	Bob Pitts	Interference	10:33	2:00
1st	MTU	Tony Cuculic	Illegal check	12:22	2:00
2nd	MTU	Cliff Wylie	High-sticking	24:01	2:00
2nd	UM	Ed Switzer	Illegal check	25:29	2:00
2nd	UM	Bob Schiller	Slashing	26:58	2:00
2nd	MTU	Tom Kennedy	Tripping	27:44	2:00
2nd	MTU	Ken Stenlund	Elbowing	32:43	2:00
2nd	UM	Jerry Karpinka	Roughing	39:03	2:00
2nd	UM	Tom Rendall	Fighting	39:03	5:00
2nd	UM	Tom Rendall	Game misconduct	39:03	10:00
2nd	MTU	Ken Stenlund	Fighting	39:03	5:00
2nd	MTU	Ken Stenlund	Game misconduct	39:03	10:00
3rd	none				

Shots by period
Team	1	2	3	T
Michigan Tech	22	10	10	42
Michigan	14	14	11	39

Goaltenders
Team	Name	Saves	Goals against	Time on ice
MTU	Bob McManus	32	7	
UM	Lorne Howes	37	5	

== All-Tournament team ==
=== First Team ===
- G: Lorne Howes* (Michigan)
- D: Bob Pitts (Michigan)
- D: Bob Schiller (Michigan)
- F: Pete Aubry (Michigan Tech)
- F: Tom Rendall (Michigan)
- F: Ed Switzer (Michigan)

* Most Outstanding Player(s)

=== Second Team ===
- G: Sarge Whittier (St. Lawrence)
- D: Bill Renner (St. Lawrence)
- D: Willie Tattersall (Michigan Tech)
- F: Cliff Wylie (Michigan Tech)
- F: Ron Stenlund (Michigan Tech)
- F: Joe McLean (St. Lawrence)
