= Clare Smith =

Canadian ice hockey player

- Born: 1933 (age 92–93) Red Deer, Alberta, Canada
- Height: 5 ft 7 in (170 cm)
- Weight: 160 lb (73 kg; 11 st 6 lb)
- Position: Forward
- Shot: Right
- Played for: Brandon Wheat Kings; Colorado College; Wembley Lions
- Playing career: 1953–1958

Clare Smith (born 1933) is a Canadian retired ice hockey forward who was an All-American for Colorado College.

== Career ==
Smith was part of CC's impressive recruiting class in 1952 and when he debuted for the team in 1953 he provided an immediate boost to the offense, leading the team in scoring at nearly two points per game. The following year he raised his total to 60 points, again leading the team in scoring, and helped CC return to the NCAA tournament. The Tigers made their third appearance in the championship game that season but couldn't manage to defeat Michigan despite a goal from Smith. For his great season, Smith was honored as an AHCA First Team All-American. and was named to the All-Tournament Second Team. Smith's offense declined significantly in his senior season and CC suffered accordingly; the Tigers slipped to third in the conference and narrowly missed out on another appearance in the national tournament.

== Statistics ==
=== Regular season and playoffs ===
			Regular season					Playoffs
Season	Team	League	GP	G	A	Pts	PIM	GP	G	A	Pts	PIM
1951–52	Brandon Wheat Kings	MJHL	35	12	25	37	24	10	8	4	12	2
1952–53	Brandon Wheat Kings	MJHL	36	22	32	54	37	4	3	3	6	2
1953–54	Colorado College	WIHL	24	23	23	46	14	—	—	—	—	—
1954–55	Colorado College	WIHL	28	21	39	60	14	—	—	—	—	—
1955–56	Colorado College	WIHL	28	15	21	36	—	—	—	—	—	—
1957–58	Wembley Lions	BNL	32	18	31	49	14	24	17	10	27	8
MJHL totals			71	34	57	91	61	—	—	—	—	—
NCAA totals			80	59	83	142	—	—	—	—	—	—

== Awards and honors ==
Award	Year
All-WIHL First Team	1954–55
AHCA First Team All-American	1954–55
NCAA All-Tournament Second Team	1955
All-WIHL Second Team	1955–56
