= Bill MacFarland =

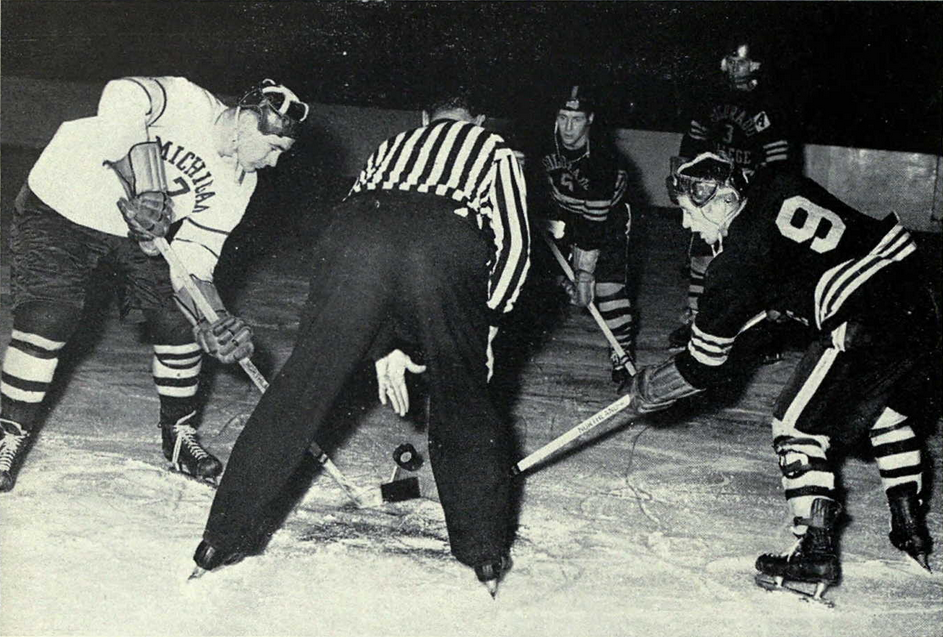
- MacFarland facing off with Clare Smith of Colorado, 1956
- Born: April 4, 1932 Toronto, Ontario, Canada
- Died: August 11, 2011 (aged 79) Scottsdale, Arizona, USA
- Playing career: 1952–1964

William H. MacFarland (April 4, 1932 – August 12, 2011) was an ice hockey player who played in college for the University of Michigan and professionally for the Seattle Totems of the Western Hockey League. He was inducted into the University of Michigan Athletic Hall of Honor in January 2009.

== Junior hockey and University of Michigan ==
A native of Toronto, Ontario, MacFarland played junior hockey with the Toronto Marlboros in the early 1950s. He enrolled at the University of Michigan in 1952 and played three seasons for the Wolverines hockey team. He was the captain of the Michigan teams that won back-to-back NCAA championships in the 1954–55 and 1955–56 seasons. MacFarland was also named to the NCAA Frozen Four All-Tournament Team in 1955. While playing for Michigan, MacFarland received three All-American and All-WCHA honors. MacFarland and his teammate Willard Ikola from the 1954–56 teams have both been inducted into the University of Michigan Athletic Hall of Honor.

== Professional hockey player ==
After graduating from Michigan, MacFarland played eleven seasons in the Western Hockey League, where he received the George Leader Cup as the league's Most Valuable Player in 1962. After one season with the Edmonton Flyers, he asked to be transferred to Seattle so that he could attend the University of Washington Law School. MacFarland scored 35 goals for the Seattle Totems in the 1958–59 season and compiled 17 points in the playoffs as Seattle won its first WHL championship. In the 1961–62 season, he led the WHL with 46 goals and was named the league's MVP. In all, MacFarland played parts of ten seasons with the Seattle Americans and Seattle Totems.

MacFarland received his law degree and was admitted to the Washington State Bar in 1964 while still an active hockey player. In a profile of MacFarland, who had a reputation as an enforcer on the ice, the Post-Intelligencer said: "He simply had a cerebral side, too. This unlikely combination of ice arena and courtroom acumen made him the most erudite hockey man to come through the Northwest."

In a 1963 WHL playoff game in San Francisco, MacFarland was shoved through an open gate and hit his head against a parked Zamboni. In the ensuing brawl, MacFarland had his lip split in two places, prompting the doctor treating his wounds to ask, "Didn't I read somewhere that you passed the bar exam? Why are you doing this?"

In his career playing in Seattle, MacFarland scored 299 goals and compiled 643 points, ranking him third all-time in team history. He ranks second all-time in goals (25), assists (43) and points (68) for the Totems. During his entire WHL career, MacFarlnd scored 324 goals in 688 games. When he retired as a player, he had a "dislocated knee and six broken teeth among his battle scars."

== Professional hockey coach and administrator ==
MacFarland became the Totems' coach in 1966 and led the team to WHL championships in 1967 and 1968. He retired as coach in 1970 and had a 137-121-33 record as coach of the Seattle franchise. From 1972–74, he served as president of the WHL and arranged a series of games between WHL teams and a Russian all-star team in 1974. After the demise of the WHL and the Totems franchise, MacFarland moved to Phoenix, Arizona, where he became one of the owners of the Phoenix Roadrunners and president of the World Hockey Association from 1975 to 1977. In spite of his previous successes Phoenix fans were appalled at the idea of his involvement with the new WHA franchise, having felt he had continually favored the Totems in decisions impacting the two teams while WHL president. As a result, his decisions were constantly criticised by the local media and a very vocal fan base during the time he managed the WHA franchise.

== Career after hockey ==
For a short time, MacFarland also owned Arena Football League and indoor soccer league franchises in Las Vegas. He also spent 17 years working for Sterling International, a company that places high-level executives with multinational Asian businesses. Later in life, MacFarland lived in Scottsdale, Arizona, and his company had offices in Tokyo, Beijing and Shanghai.

== Awards and honors ==
Award	Year
All-WIHL Second Team	1953–54; 1954–55
NCAA All-Tournament Second Team	1954
AHCA Second Team All-American	1954–55
NCAA All-Tournament First Team	1955
All-WIHL First Team	1955–56
AHCA First Team All-American	1955–56

== See also ==
- University of Michigan Athletic Hall of Honor
