= 1955–56 NCAA men's ice hockey season =

- Duration: November 1955– March 17, 1956
- NCAA tournament: 1956
- National championship: Broadmoor Ice Palace; Colorado Springs, Colorado
- NCAA champion: Michigan

The 1955–56 NCAA men's ice hockey season began in November 1955 and concluded with the 1956 NCAA Men's Ice Hockey Tournament's championship game on March 17, 1956, at the Broadmoor Ice Palace in Colorado Springs, Colorado. This was the 9th season in which an NCAA ice hockey championship was held and is the 62nd year overall where an NCAA school fielded a team.

Clarkson completed the first undefeated season, going 23–0, since the inception of the NCAA tournament. As of 2016 only Cornell (in 1970) has been able to accomplish the same feat.

== Regular season ==
=== Season tournaments ===
Tournament	Dates	Teams	Champion
Boston Arena Christmas Tournament	December 26–31	9	Clarkson
Rensselaer Holiday Tournament	December 30–January 2	4	Minnesota
Beanpot	February 6, 8	4	Boston College

=== Standings ===
1955–56 NCAA Independent ice hockey standings
	Intercollegiate							Overall					
	GP	W	L	T	Pct.	GF	GA	GP	W	L	T	GF	GA
Amherst	–	–	–	–	–	–	–	14	7	7	0	–	–
American International	–	–	–	–	–	–	–	15	11	4	0	–	–
Army	14	9	5	0	.643	62	42	16	11	5	0	72	46
Babson	–	–	–	–	–	–	–	–	–	–	–	–	–
Boston College	–	–	–	–	–	–	–	21	14	7	0	105	82
Boston University	22	11	11	0	.500	107	113	22	11	11	0	107	113
Bowdoin	–	–	–	–	–	–	–	14	6	8	0	–	–
Brown	–	–	–	–	–	–	–	19	10	9	0	82	62
Colby	–	–	–	–	–	–	–	13	5	8	0	–	–
Dartmouth	–	–	–	–	–	–	–	23	5	18	0	71	134
Hamilton	–	–	–	–	–	–	–	13	4	9	0	–	–
Harvard	–	–	–	–	–	–	–	25	15	10	0	125	77
Lehigh	3	0	2	1	.167	9	25	8	2	5	1	15	58
Massachusetts	–	–	–	–	–	–	–	11	5	6	0	44	46
MIT	–	–	–	–	–	–	–	8	2	6	0	23	43
New Hampshire	–	–	–	–	–	–	–	14	3	11	0	39	80
Northeastern	–	–	–	–	–	–	–	25	13	12	0	123	130
Norwich	–	–	–	–	–	–	–	12	6	6	0	–	–
Princeton	–	–	–	–	–	–	–	20	11	9	0	80	70
Providence	–	–	–	–	–	–	–	23	7	16	0	100	152
St. Olaf	–	–	–	–	–	–	–	8	4	4	0	–	–
Tufts	–	–	–	–	–	–	–	17	5	12	0	–	–
Williams	–	–	–	–	–	–	–	13	5	8	0	–	–
Yale	–	–	–	–	–	–	–	18	9	9	0	60	68

1955–56 Minnesota Intercollegiate Athletic Conference ice hockey standings
	Conference							Overall					
	GP	W	L	T	PTS	GF	GA	GP	W	L	T	GF	GA
Minnesota–Duluth †	12	12	0	0	1.000	–	–	23	17	6	0	–	–
Augsburg	–	–	–	–	–	–	–	–	–	–	–	–	–
Concordia	–	–	–	–	–	–	–	8	2	6	0	–	–
Gustavus Adolphus	–	–	–	–	–	–	–	11	7	4	0	–	–
Hamline	–	–	–	–	–	–	–	–	–	–	–	–	–
Macalester	–	–	–	–	–	–	–	–	–	–	–	–	–
Saint John's	–	–	–	–	–	–	–	17	12	4	1	–	–
St. Thomas	–	–	–	–	–	–	–	12	6	8	0	–	–
† indicates conference champion

1955–56 Tri-State League standings
	Conference							Overall					
	GP	W	L	T	PTS	GF	GA	GP	W	L	T	GF	GA
Clarkson†	6	6	0	0	12	44	12	23	23	0	0	172	58
St. Lawrence	6	4	2	0	8	31	24	23	18	5	0	130	47
Rensselaer	6	2	4	0	4	18	26	18	12	6	0	105	56
Middlebury	6	0	6	0	0	10	42	21	10	11	0	–	–
† indicates conference regular season champion

1955–56 Western Intercollegiate Hockey League
	Conference								Overall					
	GP	W	L	T	PCT	PTS	GF	GA	GP	W	L	T	GF	GA
Michigan†	18	15	2	1	.858	19	80	37	23	20	2	1	109	49
Michigan Tech	20	14	6	0	.700	17	82	61	28	21	7	0	156	83
Colorado College	18	10	8	0	.556	14	72	66	28	17	11	0	144	100
Minnesota	22	11	10	1	.523	12	63	60	29	16	12	1	106	80
North Dakota	20	7	13	0	.350	10	67	93	28	11	16	1	100	129
Denver	16	6	8	2	.438	10	58	58	26	12	11	3	130	84
Michigan State	18	1	17	0	.056	2	35	82	23	5	18	0	55	96
† indicates conference regular season champion Note: All games played between league members counted in the standings. When teams played each other twice, two points were awarded for a win, one point for a tie. When teams met each other four times, one point was awarded for a win, one-half point for a tie. Maximum of 24 points available.

== 1956 NCAA Tournament ==
Semifinals; March 15–16
W1	Michigan	2*
E2	St. Lawrence	1
E1	Boston College	4
W2	Michigan Tech	10

National championship March 17
W1	Michigan	7
W2	Michigan Tech	5
Third-place game
E1	Boston College	2
E2	St. Lawrence	6

Note: * denotes overtime period(s)

== Player stats ==
=== Scoring leaders ===
The following players led the league in points at the conclusion of the season.

GP = Games played; G = Goals; A = Assists; Pts = Points; PIM = Penalty minutes

Player	Class	Team	GP	G	A	Pts	PIM
Ed Rowe	Junior	Clarkson	23	27	38	65	-
Ken Yackel	Senior	Minnesota	30	31	27	58	102
Garry Kearns	Sophomore	Rensselaer	18	26	32	58	23
Richard Cavanaugh	Junior	Northeastern	24	30	27	57	-
Grant Childerhouse	Sophomore	Clarkson	23	36	17	53	-
Jack McManus	Junior	Michigan Tech	28	29	23	52	14
John Andrews	Freshman	Colorado College	-	27	25	52	-
Bill Reichart	Junior	North Dakota	28	28	23	51	24
Clare Smith	Junior	Colorado College	-	24	26	50	-
Bob Cleary	Sophomore	Harvard	25	23	27	50	-

=== Leading goaltenders ===
The following goaltenders led the league in goals against average at the end of the regular season while playing at least 33% of their team's total minutes.

GP = Games played; Min = Minutes played; W = Wins; L = Losses; OT = Overtime/shootout losses; GA = Goals against; SO = Shutouts; SV% = Save percentage; GAA = Goals against average

Player	Class	Team	GP	Min	W	L	OT	GA	SO	SV%	GAA
Andy LaHaye	Junior	Michigan Tech	-	-	-	-	-	-	-	.928	2.00
Bill Sloan	Senior	St. Lawrence	20	1049	16	4	0	37	4	.912	2.12
Dave Broadbelt	Sophomore	Denver	10	-	-	-	-	-	1	.907	2.50
Eddie MacDonald	Sophomore	Clarkson	23	1381	23	0	0	58	2	-	2.52
Jack McCartan	Sophomore	Minnesota	24	1440	-	-	-	67	0	-	2.80
John Stopen	Junior	Rensselaer	18	1088	12	6	0	56	2	.892	3.09
Bob McManus	Junior	Michigan Tech	-	-	-	-	-	-	-	.895	3.13
George Scherer	Senior	Yale	-	-	-	-	-	-	-	-	3.38
Tom Yurkovich	Junior	North Dakota	28	-	11	16	1	-	2	.862	3.96

== Awards ==
=== NCAA ===
Award		Recipient
Spencer Penrose Award		Bill Harrison, Clarkson
Most Outstanding Player in NCAA Tournament		Lorne Howes, Michigan
AHCA All-American Teams
First Team	Position	Second Team
Lorne Howes, Michigan	G	Bill Sloan, St. Lawrence
Bob Schiller, Michigan	D	Chuck Lundberg, St. Lawrence
Doug Silverberg, Colorado College	D	Art Smith, Clarkson
Garry Kearns, Rensselaer	F	Jack McManus, Michigan Tech
Bill MacFarland, Michigan	F	Ken Yackel, Minnesota
Ed Rowe, Clarkson	F	Ed Zifcak, St. Lawrence

=== WIHL ===
No Awards

All-WIHL Teams
First Team	Position	Second Team
Lorne Howes, Michigan	G	Bob McManus, Michigan Tech
Ken Yackel, Minnesota	D	Ed Zemrau, Denver
Doug Silverberg, Colorado College	D	Bob Pitts, Michigan
Bill MacFarland, Michigan	F	John Andrews, Colorado College
Bill Reichart, North Dakota	F	Tom Rendall, Michigan
Jack McManus, Michigan Tech	F	Clare Smith, Colorado College
