= Lorne Howes =

Canadian ice hockey player

- Born: January 5, 1932 (age 94) Kirkland Lake, Ontario, CAN
- Position: Goaltender
- Played for: Barrie Flyers; Michigan
- Playing career: 1954–1956

Lorne Howes is a Canadian retired ice hockey goaltender who won back-to-back National Championships for Michigan in the 1950s.

== Career ==
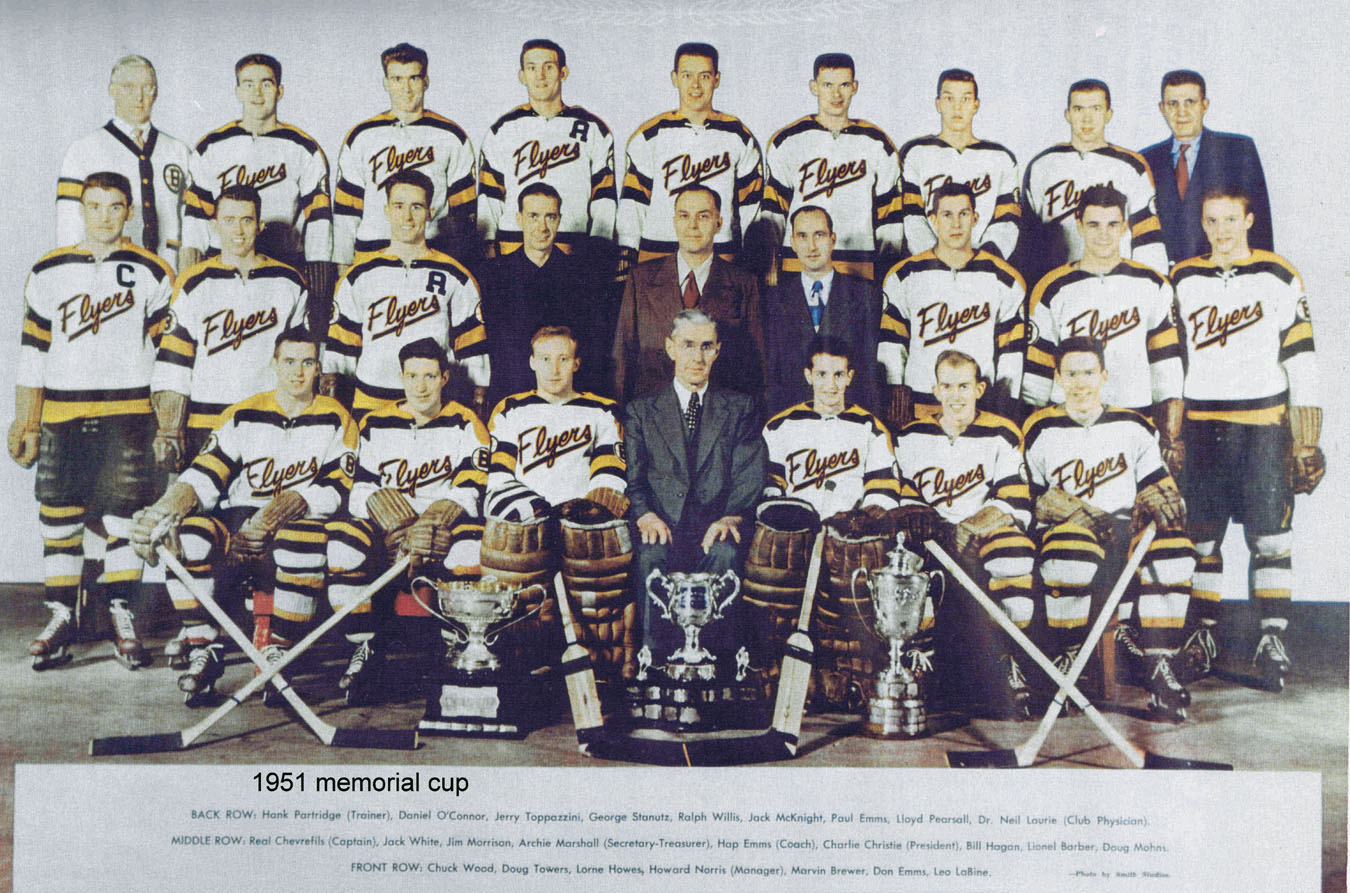
Memorial Cup Winner 1951 Barrie Flyers

After finishing his junior career with the Barrie Flyers, which included winning the 1951 Memorial Cup, Howes received interest from the Boston Bruins but he decided to play college hockey instead. Howest began attending Michigan in 1952 while the program was at its pinnacle under Vic Heyliger. Howes did not play in his first year of varsity eligibility due to being the third goaltender behind Willard Ikola and Bill Lucier but, once the All-American Ikola graduated in 1954, Howes was able to take control of the net. Howes backstopped Michigan to a second-place finish in the WIHL in 1954–55, earning AHCA Second Team All-American honors as well as a spot in the NCAA tournament. Howes played a solid game in the semifinal but was supernatural in the title match. He turned aside 47 of 50 shots from Colorado College and was the unquestioned star for the Wolverines' 5th championship, earning a spot on the All-Tournament First Team.

His senior season turned out even better and Howes led Michigan to a first-place finish with an 18–2–1 record, allowing just 43 goals in 21 games, and was named as a First Team All-American. Michigan relied much more heavily on Howes in 1956 than they had the year before due to the offense being a weakness, and Howes delivered in the semifinal. The Wolverines faced a tough opponent in St. Lawrence, who were eager to make up for their semifinal loss the year before, but Howes turned aside all but one of the Larries' shots and allowed Michigan to take the game in overtime. The Maize and Blue faced a game opponent in Michigan Tech for the championship and, after weathering a 22-shot barrage in the first period, Michigan found itself ahead 4–3. Two goals by the Huskies erased the lead, however, but after allowing the fifth goal, Howes bore down and stopped every remaining shot that came his way, giving Michigan the opportunity to retake and hold the lead, winning the game and the championship 7–5. Howes stopped 37 shots against Michigan Tech and was named to another All-Tournament First Team and received the Tournament MOP as well.

Howes played part of the next season but he graduated with a degree in geological science in 1956. The Wolverines again made the tournament that season but without Howes in net the team surrendered 13 goals to Colorado College in the final, losing a chance for a second three-peat. Howes was inducted into the Dekers Club Hall of Fame in 1965 and the University of Michigan hall of Honor in 2016. Howes was the last in a line of great goaltenders that Heyliger brought to Ann Arbor and it would be many years before the Wolverines could again boast that level of talent in net.

== Awards and honors ==
| Award | Year |
|---|---|
| AHCA Second Team All-American | 1954–55 |
| NCAA All-Tournament First Team | 1955, 1956 |
| All-WIHL First Team | 1955–56 |
| AHCA First Team All-American | 1955–56 |

Awards and achievements
| Preceded by Phil Hilton | NCAA Tournament Most Outstanding Player; 1956 | Succeeded by Bob McCusker |
