= 1954–55 NCAA men's ice hockey season =

- Duration: November 1954– March 12, 1955
- NCAA tournament: 1955
- National championship: Broadmoor Ice Palace; Colorado Springs, Colorado
- NCAA champion: Michigan

The 1954–55 NCAA Division I men's ice hockey season began in November 1954 and concluded with the 1955 NCAA Men's Ice Hockey Tournament's championship game on March 12, 1955 at the Broadmoor Ice Palace in Colorado Springs, Colorado. This was the 8th season in which an NCAA ice hockey championship was held and is the 61st year overall where an NCAA school fielded a team.

== Regular season ==
=== Season tournaments ===
Tournament	Dates	Teams	Champion
Boston Arena Christmas Tournament	December 27–29	8	McGill
Rensselaer Holiday Tournament	December 30–January 1	4	Toronto
Beanpot	February 7–8	4	Harvard

=== Standings ===
1954–55 NCAA Independent ice hockey standings
	Intercollegiate							Overall					
	GP	W	L	T	Pct.	GF	GA	GP	W	L	T	GF	GA
Amherst	–	–	–	–	–	–	–	13	4	9	0	–	–
American International	–	–	–	–	–	–	–	10	6	4	0	–	–
Army	15	8	7	0	.533	71	83	16	8	8	0	73	86
Boston College	–	–	–	–	–	–	–	21	13	8	0	104	74
Boston University	23	4	19	0	.174	68	163	23	4	19	0	68	163
Bowdoin	–	–	–	–	–	–	–	9	2	7	0	–	–
Brown	–	–	–	–	–	–	–	18	9	8	1	92	77
Colby	–	–	–	–	–	–	–	6	1	5	0	–	–
Dartmouth	–	–	–	–	–	–	–	21	10	11	0	84	109
Hamilton	–	–	–	–	–	–	–	14	3	10	1	–	–
Harvard	–	–	–	–	–	–	–	21	17	3	1	138	52
Lehigh	–	–	–	–	–	–	–	–	–	–	–	–	–
Massachusetts	–	–	–	–	–	–	–	9	6	3	0	52	53
MIT	–	–	–	–	–	–	–	14	5	9	0	–	–
New Hampshire	–	–	–	–	–	–	–	13	5	8	0	59	65
Northeastern	–	–	–	–	–	–	–	22	7	15	0	71	126
Norwich	–	–	–	–	–	–	–	15	10	5	0	–	–
Princeton	–	–	–	–	–	–	–	17	8	8	1	66	67
Providence^	–	–	–	–	–	–	–	15	8	7	0	84	87
St. Olaf	–	–	–	–	–	–	–	–	–	–	–	–	–
Tufts	–	–	–	–	–	–	–	19	16	3	0	–	–
Williams	–	–	–	–	–	–	–	12	5	7	0	–	–
Yale	–	–	–	–	–	–	–	22	8	12	2	77	74
^ Providence was a member of the Northeast League but because the conference did not sponsor ice hockey they are listed here

1954–55 Minnesota Intercollegiate Athletic Conference ice hockey standings
	Conference							Overall					
	GP	W	L	T	PTS	GF	GA	GP	W	L	T	GF	GA
St. Thomas †	–	–	–	–	–	–	–	17	14	3	0	–	–
Minnesota–Duluth	9	7	2	0	.778	–	–	16	9	7	0	–	–
Augsburg	–	–	–	–	–	–	–	–	–	–	–	–	–
Concordia	–	–	–	–	–	–	–	8	3	5	0	–	–
Gustavus Adolphus	–	–	–	–	–	–	–	12	7	5	0	–	–
Hamline	–	–	–	–	–	–	–	–	–	–	–	–	–
Macalester	–	–	–	–	–	–	–	–	–	–	–	–	–
Saint John's	–	–	–	–	–	–	–	9	4	5	0	–	–
† indicates conference champion

1954–55 Tri-State League standings
	Conference							Overall					
	GP	W	L	T	PTS	GF	GA	GP	W	L	T	GF	GA
St. Lawrence†	6	6	0	0	12	32	14	25	19	5	1	133	66
Clarkson	6	4	2	0	8	27	15	22	18	4	0	182	52
Rensselaer	6	1	5	0	2	24	25	22	9	11	2	95	66
Middlebury	6	1	5	0	2	12	39	21	12	9	0	–	–
† indicates conference regular season champion

1954–55 Western Intercollegiate Hockey League
	Conference								Overall					
	GP	W	L	T	PCT	PTS	GF	GA	GP	W	L	T	GF	GA
Colorado College†	18	14	4	0	.778	19	73	48	28	22	6	0	144	77
Michigan	18	13	5	0	.722	16	78	55	24	18	5	1	107	70
Minnesota	24	10	12	2	.458	11	98	96	30	16	12	2	141	109
Michigan Tech	20	8	11	1	.425	10½	72	68	26	12	13	1	116	86
Denver	18	8	9	1	.472	10½	83	68	30	18	11	1	175	110
North Dakota	22	9	12	1	.432	9½	63	100	28	14	13	1	115	115
Michigan State	20	5	14	1	.275	7½	62	94	27	9	17	1	89	125
† indicates conference regular season champion Note: All games played between league members counted in the standings. When teams played each other twice, two points were awarded for a win, one point for a tie. When teams met each other four times, one point was awarded for a win, one-half point for a tie. Maximum of 24 points available.

== 1955 NCAA Tournament ==
Semifinals; March 10–11
E1	Harvard	3
W2	Michigan	7
W1	Colorado College	2
E2	St. Lawrence	1

National championship March 12
W2	Michigan	5
W1	Colorado College	3
Third-place game
E1	Harvard	6
E2	St. Lawrence	3

Note: * denotes overtime period(s)

== Player stats ==
=== Scoring leaders ===
The following players led the league in points at the conclusion of the season.

GP = Games played; G = Goals; A = Assists; Pts = Points; PIM = Penalty minutes

Player	Class	Team	GP	G	A	Pts	PIM
Bill Cleary	Junior	Harvard	21	42	47	89	-
John Mayasich	Senior	Minnesota	30	41	39	80	28
Clare Smith	Sophomore	Colorado College	27	21	39	60	14
Ron O'Brien	Sophomore	St. Lawrence	25	27	31	58	-
Bill MacFarland	Sophomore	Michigan	24	33	23	56	63
Frank Chiarelli	Senior	Rensselaer	19	29	27	56	8
Tom Meeker	Junior	Clarkson	22	23	33	56	-
Ed Rowe	Sophomore	Clarkson	21	29	25	54	-
Jack Porter	Junior	Clarkson	21	21	31	52	-
Lee Fournier	Sophomore	St. Lawrence	25	20	31	51	-

=== Leading goaltenders ===
The following goaltenders led the league in goals against average at the end of the regular season while playing at least 33% of their team's total minutes.

GP = Games played; Min = Minutes played; W = Wins; L = Losses; OT = Overtime/shootout losses; GA = Goals against; SO = Shutouts; SV% = Save percentage; GAA = Goals against average

Player	Class	Team	GP	Min	W	L	OT	GA	SO	SV%	GAA
Bill Sloan	Junior	St. Lawrence	25	1466	19	5	1	63	1	.898	2.58
Andy LaHaye	Sophomore	Michigan Tech	-	-	-	-	-	-	-	.888	2.60
Jeff Simus	Junior	Colorado College	24	-	-	-	-	-	-	-	2.92
Bob Fox	Senior	Rensselaer	21	1272	8	11	2	66	5	.892	3.11
Bob McManus	Sophomore	Michigan Tech	-	-	-	-	-	-	-	.896	3.30
George Scherer	Junior	Yale	-	-	-	-	-	-	-	-	3.33
Jim Mattson	Senior	Minnesota	30	1783	16	12	2	104	2	.888	3.50
Don Whyte	Sophomore	Denver	-	-	16	-	-	-	0	.887	3.60
Spike Schultz	Junior	North Dakota	23	-	-	-	-	-	1	.859	4.39
Edward Schiller	Junior	Michigan State	24	-	-	-	-	-	-	-	4.58

== Awards ==
=== NCAA ===
Award		Recipient
Spencer Penrose Award		Cooney Weiland, Harvard
Most Outstanding Player in NCAA Tournament		Phil Hilton, Colorado College
AHCA All-American Teams
First Team	Position	Second Team
Bill Sloan, St. Lawrence	G	Lorne Howes, Michigan
Doug Silverberg, Colorado College	D	Phil Hilton, Colorado College
Ken Yackel, Minnesota	D	Bob Schiller, Michigan
Bill Cleary, Harvard	F	John Mayasich, Minnesota
Bill Reichart, North Dakota	F	Bill MacFarland, Michigan
Clare Smith, Colorado College	F	Jack McManus, Michigan Tech

=== WIHL ===
All-WIHL Teams
First Team	Position	Second Team
Bob McManus, Michigan Tech	G	Jeff Simus, Colorado College
Ken Yackel, Minnesota	D	Doug Silverberg, Colorado College
Phil Hilton, Colorado College	D	Bob Schiller, Michigan
	D	Bill Abbott, Denver
John Mayasich, Minnesota	F	Jack McManus, Michigan Tech
Bill Reichart, North Dakota	F	Bunt Hubchik, Colorado College
Clare Smith, Colorado College	F	Bill MacFarland, Michigan
	F	Jack Smith, Denver
