= Bob McManus =

American journalist (1943–2025)

McManus with then-Secretary of State Condoleeza Rice in 2006

Bob McManus (April 8, 1943 – April 5, 2025) was an editor at The New York Post. He joined the Post in 1984. He became the editorial page editor for the tabloid in 2000, and retired in 2013. He had a radio show based in Albany, New York. McManus died on April 5, 2025, at the age of 81.
