= Broadmoor World Arena (1938) =

Former arena in Colorado Springs

Coordinates: 38.790612°N 104.85265°W

- Interactive map of Broadmoor World Arena
- Former names: Broadmoor Ice Palace (1938–1960)
- Location: The Broadmoor; 1 Lake Ave; Colorado Springs, CO 80906
- Owner: The Broadmoor
- Operator: The Broadmoor
- Capacity: 3,000

Construction
- Groundbreaking: 1937 (conversion)
- Opened: January, 1938 (ice arena)
- Closed: March 1994
- Demolished: 1994

Tenants
- Broadmoor Skating Club (1939–1994); Colorado College Tigers (NCAA) (1938–1994)

The Broadmoor World Arena was a skating rink and hockey arena located at The Broadmoor Resort & Spa in Colorado Springs, Colorado. Originally an outdoor equestrian center and riding academy, the building was enclosed and converted into an ice arena which opened in January 1938. It was the original home of the Colorado College Tigers hockey team, as well as the Broadmoor Skating Club, a major force in the figure skating community. The building served as the first home of the NCAA Hockey Championships, hosting the first ten Final Fours (1948–1957) and once more, in 1969. The arena served as host to the International Ice Hockey Federation World Championships in 1962. It also hosted the World Figure Skating Championships five times between 1957 and 1975.

The arena was the primary arena setting in the 1978 movie Ice Castles.

In 1993, the Broadmoor announced that it would be closing the arena to make room for a $27 million expansion of the resort. It closed in March 1994. The last major event held at the arena was the 1994 World Junior Figure Skating Championships. The Tigers moved their hockey games to the similarly named World Arena.

In April 2014, after an agreement with the Anschutz Entertainment Group (owners of The Broadmoor resort), the World Arena in south Colorado Springs was formally renamed the Broadmoor World Arena, in order to take advantage of the name recognition of the original building.

There is a memorial on the grounds of the hotel to the members of the 1961 US Figure Skating team, all of whom perished in the crash of their flight to the 1961 championships near Brussels, Belgium. Many of them had trained at the Broadmoor.

Preceded by first event	Host of the Frozen Four; 1948 – 1957	Succeeded by Williams Arena; Minneapolis, Minnesota
Preceded by Duluth Arena; Duluth, Minnesota	Host of the Frozen Four; 1969	Succeeded by Olympic Center; Lake Placid, New York
