= List of St. Lawrence Saints men's ice hockey seasons =

This is a season-by-season list of records compiled by St. Lawrence in men's ice hockey.

St. Lawrence University has made twenty-two appearances in the NCAA Tournament, making the Frozen Four seven times and the championship game two times.

== Season-by-season results ==
Note: GP = Games played, W = Wins, L = Losses, T = Ties

NCAA D-I Champions	NCAA Frozen Four	Conference regular season champions	Conference Division Champions	Conference Playoff Champions

Season	Conference	Regular season (Note: Code explanation; GP—Games Played, W—Wins, L—Losses, T—Tied games, OTW—Overtime Wins, OTL—Overtime Loses, 3/SW—Win in 3 on 3 overtime or shootout, Pts—Points*)														Conference Tournament Results	National Tournament Results
Season	Conference	Conference									Overall					Conference Tournament Results	National Tournament Results
Season	Conference	GP	W	L	T	OTW	OTL	3/SW	Pts*	Finish	GP	W	L	T	%	Conference Tournament Results	National Tournament Results
D. F. McCarthy (1925–1926)
1925–26	Independent	–	–	–	–	–	–	–	–	–	2	0	2	0	.000		
Formoza Degre (1926–1928)
1926–27	Independent	–	–	–	–	–	–	–	–	–	7	3	4	0	.429		
1927–28	Independent	–	–	–	–	–	–	–	–	–	4	2	2	0	.500		
James Mallon (1928–1930)
1928–29	Independent	–	–	–	–	–	–	–	–	–	8	3	4	1	.438		
1929–30	Independent	–	–	–	–	–	–	–	–	–	4	0	4	0	.000		
Program suspended
Alfred Sheard (1938–1941)
1938–39	Independent	–	–	–	–	–	–	–	–	–	6	0	6	0	.000		
1939–40	Independent	–	–	–	–	–	–	–	–	–	9	1	8	0	.111		
1940–41	Independent	–	–	–	–	–	–	–	–	–	8	3	5	0	.375		
Program suspended
Alfred Sheard (1942–1943)
1942–43	Independent	–	–	–	–	–	–	–	–	–	5	1	4	0	.200		
Program suspended due to World War II
John Klemens (1946–1947)
1946–47	Independent	–	–	–	–	–	–	–	–	–	6	3	3	0	.500		
Paul Patten (1947–1950)
1947–48	Independent	–	–	–	–	–	–	–	–	–	9	6	3	0	.667		
1948–49	Independent	–	–	–	–	–	–	–	–	–	7	5	2	0	.714		
1949–50	Independent	–	–	–	–	–	–	–	–	–	9	9	0	0	1.000		
Olav Kollevoll (1950–1955)
1950–51	Tri-State League	5	3	2	0	–	–	–	6	3rd	14	8	6	0	.571		
1951–52	Tri-State League	7	6	1	0	–	–	–	14	1st	20	15	5	0	.750		Lost Semifinal, 3–9 (Michigan); Lost Third-place game, 2–4 (Yale)
1952–53	Tri-State League	5	3	2	0	–	–	–	8	2nd	18	12	6	0	.667		
1953–54	Tri-State League	5	4	1	0	–	–	–	10	T–1st	22	18	3	1	.841		
1954–55	Tri-State League	6	6	0	0	–	–	–	12	1st	25	19	5	1	.780		Lost Semifinal, 1–2 (Colorado College); Lost Third-place game, 3–6 (Harvard)
George Menard (1955–1967)
1955–56	Tri-State League	6	4	2	0	–	–	–	8	2nd	23	18	5	0	.783		Lost Semifinal, 1–2 (OT) (Michigan); Won Third-place game, 6–2 (Boston College)
1956–57	Tri-State League	6	3	3	0	–	–	–	6	3rd	20	13	7	0	.650		
1957–58	Tri-State League	5	1	4	0	–	–	–	2	4th	20	10	8	2	.550		
1958–59	Tri-State League	5	5	0	0	–	–	–	12	1st	22	14	7	1	.659		Lost Semifinal, 3–4 (OT) (North Dakota); Lost Third-place game, 6–7 (2OT) (Boston College)
1959–60	Tri-State League	4	4	0	0	–	–	–	8	1st	24	14	8	2	.625		Lost Semifinal, 3–13 (Michigan Tech); Lost Third-place game, 6–7 (Boston University)
1960–61	Tri-State League	4	3	1	0	–	–	–	6	1st	21	16	5	0	.762		Won Semifinal, 6–3 (Rensselaer); Lost Championship, 2–12 (Denver)
1961–62	ECAC Hockey	15	9	5	1	–	–	–	.633	10th	27	17	9	1	.648	Won Quarterfinal, 5–3 (Boston College); Won Semifinal, 6–5 (Harvard); Won Championship, 5–2 (Clarkson)	Lost Semifinal, 1–6 (Michigan Tech); Lost Third-place game, 1–5 (Michigan)
1961–62	Tri-State League†	4	1	2	1	–	–	–	3	2nd	27	17	9	1	.648	Won Quarterfinal, 5–3 (Boston College); Won Semifinal, 6–5 (Harvard); Won Championship, 5–2 (Clarkson)	Lost Semifinal, 1–6 (Michigan Tech); Lost Third-place game, 1–5 (Michigan)
1962–63	ECAC Hockey	16	12	3	1	–	–	–	.781	4th	27	20	6	1	.759	Won Quarterfinal, 2–1 (OT) (Providence); Lost Semifinal, 2–6 (Boston College); Lost Third-place game, 5–7 (Clarkson)	
1962–63	Tri-State League†	4	3	1	0	–	–	–	7	1st	27	20	6	1	.759	Won Quarterfinal, 2–1 (OT) (Providence); Lost Semifinal, 2–6 (Boston College); Lost Third-place game, 5–7 (Clarkson)	
1963–64	ECAC Hockey	16	8	7	1	–	–	–	.531	14th	25	13	10	2	.560	Won Quarterfinal, 3–2 (Army); Won Semifinal, 3–1 (Rensselaer); Lost Championship, 1–3 (Providence)	
1963–64	Tri-State League†	4	2	1	1	–	–	–	5	T–1st	25	13	10	2	.560	Won Quarterfinal, 3–2 (Army); Won Semifinal, 3–1 (Rensselaer); Lost Championship, 1–3 (Providence)	
University Division
1964–65	ECAC Hockey	14	1	12	1	–	–	–	.107	15th	22	5	16	1	.250		
1964–65	ICAC†	4	0	3	1	–	–	–	1	3rd	22	5	16	1	.250		
1965–66	ECAC Hockey	15	8	6	1	–	–	–	.567	5th	24	15	8	1	.646	Lost Quarterfinal, 2–4 (Brown)	
1965–66	ICAC†	4	2	2	0	–	–	–	4	2nd	24	15	8	1	.646	Lost Quarterfinal, 2–4 (Brown)	
1966–67	ECAC Hockey	15	9	5	1	–	–	–	.633	4th	26	17	8	1	.673	Won Quarterfinal, 4–2 (Yale); Lost Semifinal, 2–6 (Boston University); Lost Third-place game, 4–6 (Boston College)	
1966–67	ICAC†	4	3	0	1	–	–	–	7	1st	26	17	8	1	.673	Won Quarterfinal, 4–2 (Yale); Lost Semifinal, 2–6 (Boston University); Lost Third-place game, 4–6 (Boston College)	
Bernie McKinnon (1967–1968)
1967–68	ECAC Hockey	16	11	5	1	–	–	–	.676	3rd	23	14	8	1	.630	Lost Quarterfinal, 6–7 (OT) (Boston College)	
1967–68	ICAC†	4	2	2	0	–	–	–	4	2nd	23	14	8	1	.630	Lost Quarterfinal, 6–7 (OT) (Boston College)	
George Menard (1968–1971)
1968–69	ECAC Hockey	18	8	8	2	–	–	–	.500	9th	24	11	11	2	.500	Lost Quarterfinal, 0–3 (Cornell)	
1968–69	ICAC†	4	1	3	0	–	–	–	2	3rd	24	11	11	2	.500	Lost Quarterfinal, 0–3 (Cornell)	
1969–70	ECAC Hockey	17	8	9	0	–	–	–	.471	9th	26	11	15	0	.423	Lost Quarterfinal, 1–6 (Cornell)	
1969–70	ICAC†	4	1	3	0	–	–	–	2	T–2nd	26	11	15	0	.423	Lost Quarterfinal, 1–6 (Cornell)	
1970–71	ECAC Hockey	17	5	12	0	–	–	–	.294	12th	24	10	14	0	.417		
1970–71	ICAC†	4	2	2	0	–	–	–	4	2nd	24	10	14	0	.417		
Bernie McKinnon (1971–1976)
1971–72	ECAC Hockey	18	5	12	1	–	–	–	.306	12th	26	10	14	2	.423		
1971–72	ICAC†	4	1	2	1	–	–	–	3	3rd	26	10	14	2	.423		
1972–73	ECAC Hockey	18	8	10	0	–	–	–	.444	11th	28	15	13	0	.536		
Division I
1973–74	ECAC Hockey	17	9	7	1	–	–	–	.559	5th	28	12	15	0	.444	Lost Quarterfinal, 3–5 (Cornell)	
1974–75	ECAC Hockey	22	7	14	1	–	–	–	.341	13th	28	10	17	1	.375		
1975–76	ECAC Hockey	19	7	11	1	–	–	–	.395	12th	29	11	17	1	.397		
Leon Abbott (1976–1979)
1976–77	ECAC Hockey	20	3	17	0	–	–	–	.150	16th	28	8	20	0	.286		
1977–78	ECAC Hockey	22	8	14	0	–	–	–	.364	13th	30	12	18	0	.400		
1978–79	ECAC Hockey	24	5	18	1	–	–	–	.229	15th	31	8	21	2	.290		
Dale Henwood (1979–1980)
1979–80	ECAC Hockey	21	3	18	0	–	–	–	.143	17th	32‡	6‡	26‡	0‡	.188‡		
Mike McShane (1980–1985)
1980–81	ECAC Hockey	20	9	12	1	–	–	–	.143	13th	33	15	16	2	.485		
1981–82	ECAC Hockey	21	12	8	1	–	–	–	.595	6th	31	19	11	1	.629	Lost Quarterfinal, 3–5 (Northeastern)	
1982–83	ECAC Hockey	20	14	6	0	–	–	–	.700	4th	36	23	12	1	.653	Won Quarterfinal series, 2–1 (Clarkson); Lost Semifinal, 0–1 (Providence); Lost Third-place game, 2–5 (New Hampshire)	Lost Quarterfinal series, 3–13 (Wisconsin)
1983–84	ECAC Hockey	20	10	10	0	–	–	–	.500	T–9th	32	19	13	0	.594		
1984–85	ECAC Hockey	21	12	9	0	–	–	–	24	6th	32	17	13	2	.563	Lost Quarterfinal series, 0–1–1 (Clarkson)	
Joe Marsh (1985–2012)
1985–86	ECAC Hockey	21	10	11	0	–	–	–	20	7th	31	16	15	0	.516	Lost Quarterfinal series, 0–2 (Yale)	
1986–87	ECAC Hockey	22	14	7	1	–	–	–	30	3rd	35	24	11	0	.686	Won Quarterfinal series, 2–0 (Vermont); Won Semifinal, 7–0 (Yale); Lost Championship, 3–6 (Harvard)	Lost Quarterfinal series, 4–9 (North Dakota)
1987–88	ECAC Hockey	22	18	4	0	–	–	–	36	T–1st	38	29	9	0	.763	Won Quarterfinal series, 2–0 (Princeton); Won Semifinal, 4–2 (Vermont); Won Championship, 3–0 (Clarkson)	Won Quarterfinal series, 10–4 (Wisconsin); Won Semifinal, 3–2 (Minnesota); Lost Championship, 3–4 (OT) (Lake Superior State)
1988–89	ECAC Hockey	22	18	4	0	–	–	–	36	2nd	36	29	7	0	.806	Won Quarterfinal series, 2–0 (Yale); Won Semifinal, 6–1 (Cornell); Won Championship, 4–1 (Vermont)	Lost First round series, 0–2 (Wisconsin)
1989–90	ECAC Hockey	22	12	8	2	–	–	–	26	5th	32	13	15	4	.469	Lost Quarterfinal series, 0–2 (Clarkson)	
1990–91	ECAC Hockey	22	15	6	1	–	–	–	31	T–2nd	35	21	13	1	.614	Won Quarterfinal series, 2–1 (Vermont); Won Semifinal, 4–3 (OT) (Cornell); Lost Championship, 4–5 (Clarkson)	
1991–92	ECAC Hockey	22	15	6	1	–	–	–	32	T–2nd	34	22	10	2	.676	Won Quarterfinal series, 2–0 (Princeton); Won Semifinal, 6–5 (2OT) (Rensselaer); Won Championship, 4–2 (Cornell)	Lost Regional semifinal, 2–5 (Wisconsin)
1992–93	ECAC Hockey	22	12	8	2	–	–	–	26	6th	32	17	12	3	.578	Lost Quarterfinal series, 0–2 (Clarkson)	
1993–94	ECAC Hockey	22	8	14	0	–	–	–	16	10th	31	10	21	0	.323	Lost Preliminary Game, 3–4 (Colgate)	
1994–95	ECAC Hockey	22	10	12	0	–	–	–	20	T–8th	33	15	17	1	.470	Lost Preliminary Game, 2–6 (Cornell)	
1995–96	ECAC Hockey	22	15	4	3	–	–	–	33	3rd	35	20	12	3	.614	Lost Quarterfinal series, 1–2 (Harvard)	
1996–97	ECAC Hockey	22	5	12	5	–	–	–	15	9th	35	10	20	5	.357	Lost Preliminary Game, 2–4 (Harvard)	
1997–98	ECAC Hockey	22	8	12	2	–	–	–	18	T–9th	33	9	20	4	.333	Lost First round Series, 0–1–2 (Yale)	
1998–99	ECAC Hockey	22	15	4	3	–	–	–	33	2nd	39	23	13	3	.628	Won First round series, 2–0 (Vermont); Won Semifinal, 6–3 (Rensselaer); Lost Championship, 2–3 (Clarkson)	Lost Regional Quarterfinal, 2–5 (Colorado College)
1999–00	ECAC Hockey	20	16	3	1	–	–	–	33	1st	37	27	8	2	.757	Won First round series, 2–0 (Union); Won Semifinal, 3–2 (OT) (Cornell); Won Championship, 2–0 (Rensselaer)	Won Regional semifinal, 3–2 (4OT) (Boston University); Lost National semifinal, 2–4 (Boston College)
2000–01	ECAC Hockey	22	13	6	3	–	–	–	29	2nd	37	20	13	4	.595	Won First round series, 2–0 (Union); Won Semifinal, 2–0 (Dartmouth); Won Championship, 3–1 (Cornell)	Lost Regional Quarterfinal, 2–3 (2OT) (Colorado College)
2001–02	ECAC Hockey	22	9	11	2	–	–	–	20	T–9th	34	11	21	2	.353	Lost First round series, 0–2 (Clarkson)	
2002–03	ECAC Hockey	22	7	12	3	–	–	–	17	9th	37	11	21	5	.365	Lost First round series, 1–2 (Colgate)	
2003–04	ECAC Hockey	22	7	12	3	–	–	–	17	10th	41	14	21	6	.415	Won First round series, 2–0 (Yale); Lost Quarterfinal series, 1–2 (Colgate)	
2004–05	ECAC Hockey	22	9	12	1	–	–	–	19	7th	38	17	19	2	.474	Won First round series, 2–0 (Princeton); Lost Quarterfinal series, 0–2 (Harvard)	
2005–06	ECAC Hockey	22	12	9	1	–	–	–	20	5th	40	21	17	2	.550	Won First round series, 2–1 (Brown); Lost Quarterfinal series, 1–2 (Harvard)	
2006–07	ECAC Hockey	22	16	5	1	–	–	–	33	1st	39	23	14	2	.615	Won Quarterfinal series, 2–0 (Colgate); Lost Semifinal, 0–4 (Quinnipiac); Won Third-place game, 5–3 (Dartmouth)	Lost Regional semifinal, 1–4 (Boston College)
2007–08	ECAC Hockey	22	7	13	2	–	–	–	16	9th	37	13	20	4	.405	Lost First round series, 1–2 (Colgate)	
2008–09	ECAC Hockey	22	11	7	4	–	–	–	26	4th	38	21	12	5	.618	Won Quarterfinal series, 2–0 (Quinnipiac); Lost Semifinal, 3–4 (Yale); Tied Third-place game, 2–2 (Princeton)	
2009–10	ECAC Hockey	22	9	8	5	–	–	–	23	T–5th	42	19	16	7	.536	Won First round series, 2–1 (Clarkson); Won Quarterfinal series, 2–0 (Colgate); Lost Semifinal, 1–3 (Union); Lost Third-place game, 0–3 (Brown)	
2010–11	ECAC Hockey	22	6	15	1	–	–	–	13	11th	40	13	22	5	.388	Won First round series, 2–1 (Princeton); Lost Quarterfinal series, 1–2 (Yale)	
2011–12	ECAC Hockey	22	10	11	1	–	–	–	21	8th	36	14	19	3	.431	Lost First round series, 0–2 (Dartmouth)	
Greg Carvel (2012–2016)
2012–13	ECAC Hockey	22	9	9	4	–	–	–	22	T–5th	38	18	16	4	.526	Won First round series, 2–0 (Colgate); Lost Quarterfinal series, 0–2 (Yale)	
2013–14	ECAC Hockey	22	7	11	4	–	–	–	18	8th	38	15	19	4	.447	Won First round series, 2–0 (Brown); Lost Quarterfinal series, 0–2 (Colgate)	
2014–15	ECAC Hockey	22	14	7	1	–	–	–	29	2nd	37	20	14	3	.581	Won Quarterfinal series, 2–0 (Rensselaer); Lost Semifinal, 3–4 (OT) (Colgate)	
2015–16	ECAC Hockey	22	11	8	3	–	–	–	25	4th	37	19	14	4	.568	Won Quarterfinal series, 2–0 (Clarkson); Lost Semifinal, 1–2 (OT) (Harvard)	
Mark Morris (2016–2019)
2016–17	ECAC Hockey	22	12	6	4	–	–	–	28	4th	37	17	13	7	.554	Lost Quarterfinal series, 1–2 (Quinnipiac)	
2017–18	ECAC Hockey	22	3	18	1	–	–	–	7	12th	37	8	27	2	.243	Lost First round series, 1–2 (Dartmouth)	
2018–19	ECAC Hockey	22	3	17	2	–	–	–	8	12th	37	6	29	2	.189	Lost First round series, 1–2 (Dartmouth)	
Brent Brekke (2019–Present)
2019–20	ECAC Hockey	22	2	18	2	–	–	–	8	12th	36	4	27	5	.181	Lost First round series, 0–2 (Harvard)	
2020–21	ECAC Hockey	14	4	8	2	1	1	1	15	3rd	17	6	8	3	.441	Won Semifinal, 5–4 (OT) (Colgate); Won Championship, 3–2 (OT) (Quinnipiac)	Withdrew from Tournament
2021–22	ECAC Hockey	22	7	10	5	2	0	2	26	8th	37	11	19	7	.392	Won First round series, 2–1 (Brown); Lost Quarterfinal series, 0–2 (Quinnipiac)	
2022–23	ECAC Hockey	22	12	10	0	1	2	0	37	4th	36	17	19	0	.472	Lost Quarterfinal series, 0–2 (Colgate)	
2023–24	ECAC Hockey	22	8	10	4	1	1	1	29	7th	39	14	19	6	.436	Won First Round, 4–2 (Yale); Won Quarterfinal series, 2–0 (Colgate); Won Semifinal, 3–0 (Quinnipiac); Lost Championship, 1–3 (Cornell)	
2024–25	ECAC Hockey	22	5	15	2	1	1	1	18	12th	35	9	24	2	.286	Lost First Round, 2–6 (Dartmouth)	
Totals											GP	W	L	T	%	Championships	
Regular season											2233	1073	1009	151	.514	9 Tri-State League/ICAC Championships, 3 ECAC Championships, 1 ECAC West Division Championship	
Conference Post-season											158	79	75	4	.513	7 ECAC tournament championships	
NCAA Post-season											30	5	25	0	.167	17 NCAA Tournament appearances (1 withdrawal), 9 Frozen Four appearances	
Regular season and Post-season Record											2421	1157	1109	155	.510		

* Winning percentage is used when conference schedules are unbalanced.
† St. Lawrence played jointly in ECAC Hockey and the Tri-State League/ICAC from 1961 to 1972.
‡ Leon Abbott resigned in December 1979 after losing eight consecutive games.
