= Jack Klemens =

American ice hockey player

- Born: December 28, 1921 Woodhaven, New York, U.S.
- Died: June 3, 2017 (aged 95) Canton, New York, U.S.
- Height: 5 ft 10 in (178 cm)
- Weight: 170 lb (77 kg; 12 st 2 lb)
- Position: Defenseman
- Played for: St. Lawrence
- Playing career: 1939–1948
- Military career
- Buried: St. Mary's Cemetery
- Branch: United States Army
- Service years: 1943–1945
- Rank: Corporal

John Francis Klemens (December 28, 1921 – June 3, 2017) was an American collegiate ice hockey defenseman and coach at St. Lawrence. He served in the Army during World War II and was captured during the Battle of the Bulge.

== Career ==
Hailing from Brooklyn, Klemens played roller and ice hockey growing up. After graduating from St. Francis Preparatory School in 1939, Klemens began attending St. Lawrence University in the early 1940s but suspended his studies after the United States entered World War II. In the interim, he was good enough to earn a spot with the New York Rovers, a senior amateur team under the oversight of the New York Rangers. He enlisted in the army and became a corporal in charge of a mortar battery. During the Battle of the Bulge, Klemens was captured by the German Army and sent to a POW camp where he remained until it was liberated by advancing allied forces.

After being discharged in 1945, Klemens returned to St. Lawrence. He encouraged several other hockey players from Brooklyn to take advantage of the G.I. Bill and join him in Canton to restart the school's program. The 'Boys from Brooklyn' provided the core of the team that swiftly ascended the college ranks in the late 40s. Because the team didn't have an official coach at the time, Klemens became one of the rare few undergraduates to coach a varsity ice hockey team and led them to a respectable record. He returned as a senior and, now coached by Paul Patten, Klemens led the team to the best season in its short history. During that season, Klemens was one of the prospective players for the US National Team at the upcoming Winter Olympics. He was not selected for the squad.

After graduating, Klemens married Barbara Griffiths that June and then directed youth ice hockey programs in Lake Placid. Klemens served as the building manager for the Houston Field House but returned to Canton in 1955, first as a representative of the Fitzgerald Brewery and then as a claims adjustor for Utica Mutual, until his retirement in 1983. While he lived in Canton, Klemens remained active in the youth hockey scene, coaching and teaching a generation of players in the north country.

Klemens was inducted into the St. Lawrence Athletic Hall of Fame in 1980. He was later honored by the Canton Minor Hockey Association as "The Father of Modern Hockey in the North Country".

== Career statistics ==
			Regular season					Playoffs
Season	Team	League	GP	G	A	Pts	PIM	GP	G	A	Pts	PIM
1942–43	New York Rovers	EHL	—	—	—	—	—	—	—	—	—	—
1942–43	St. Lawrence	Independent	—	—	—	—	—	—	—	—	—	—
1946–47	St. Lawrence	Independent	—	—	—	—	—	—	—	—	—	—
1947–48	St. Lawrence	Independent	—	—	—	—	—	—	—	—	—	—

=== Ice hockey ===
Record table
Season	Team	Overall	Conference	Standing	Postseason
St. Lawrence Saints Independent (1946–1947)
1946–47	St. Lawrence	5–4–0			
St. Lawrence:		5–4–0			
Total:		5–4–0			
