= Paul Patton =

Paul Patton may refer to:

- Paul E. Patton (born 1937), governor of Kentucky from 1995 until 2003
- Paul R. Patton (born 1950), professor of philosophy at the University of New South Wales, Sydney, Australia

== See also ==
- Paul Patten or the Fox, a fictional superhero in MLJ Comics and DC comics
- Paul Patten (ice hockey) (1920–1992), American ice hockey coach
