= St. Lawrence Saints men's ice hockey =

Men's ice hockey team

- Current season
- University: St. Lawrence University
- Conference: ECAC
- First season: 1925–26
- Head coach: Brent Brekke; 7th season, 61–116–23 (.363)
- Assistant coaches: Tommy Hill; Cam Doomany; Kyle Flanagan
- Arena: Appleton Arena; Canton, New York
- Colors: Scarlet and brown

NCAA tournament runner-up
- 1961, 1988

NCAA tournament Frozen Four
- 1952, 1955, 1956, 1959, 1960, 1961, 1962, 1988, 2000

NCAA tournament appearances
- 1952, 1955, 1956, 1959, 1960, 1961, 1962, 1983, 1987, 1988, 1989, 1992, 1999, 2000, 2001, 2007, 2021 (Note: SLU withdrew from the tournament before it started.)

Conference tournament champions
- ECAC: 1962, 1988, 1989, 1992, 2000, 2001, 2021

Conference regular season champions
- TSL: 1952, 1954, 1955, 1959, 1960, 1961, 1963, 1967; ECAC: 1988, 2000, 2007

Current uniform
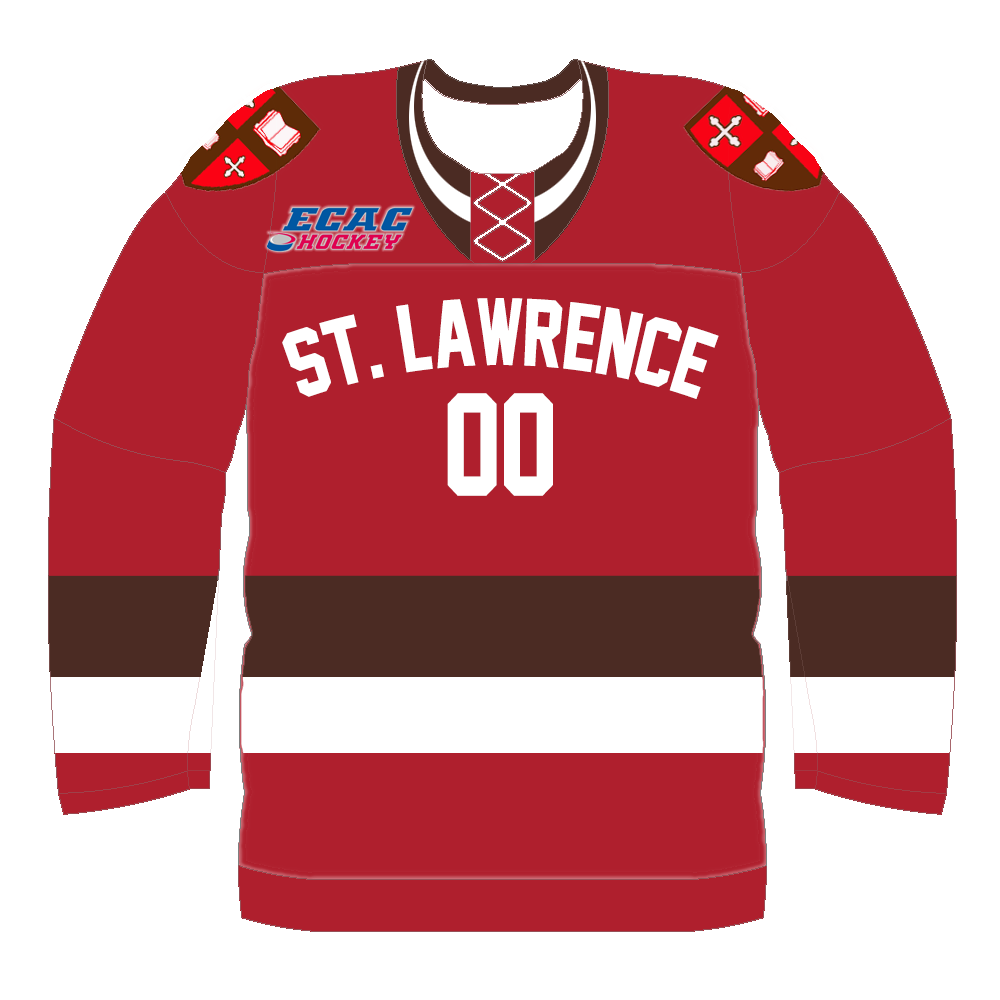

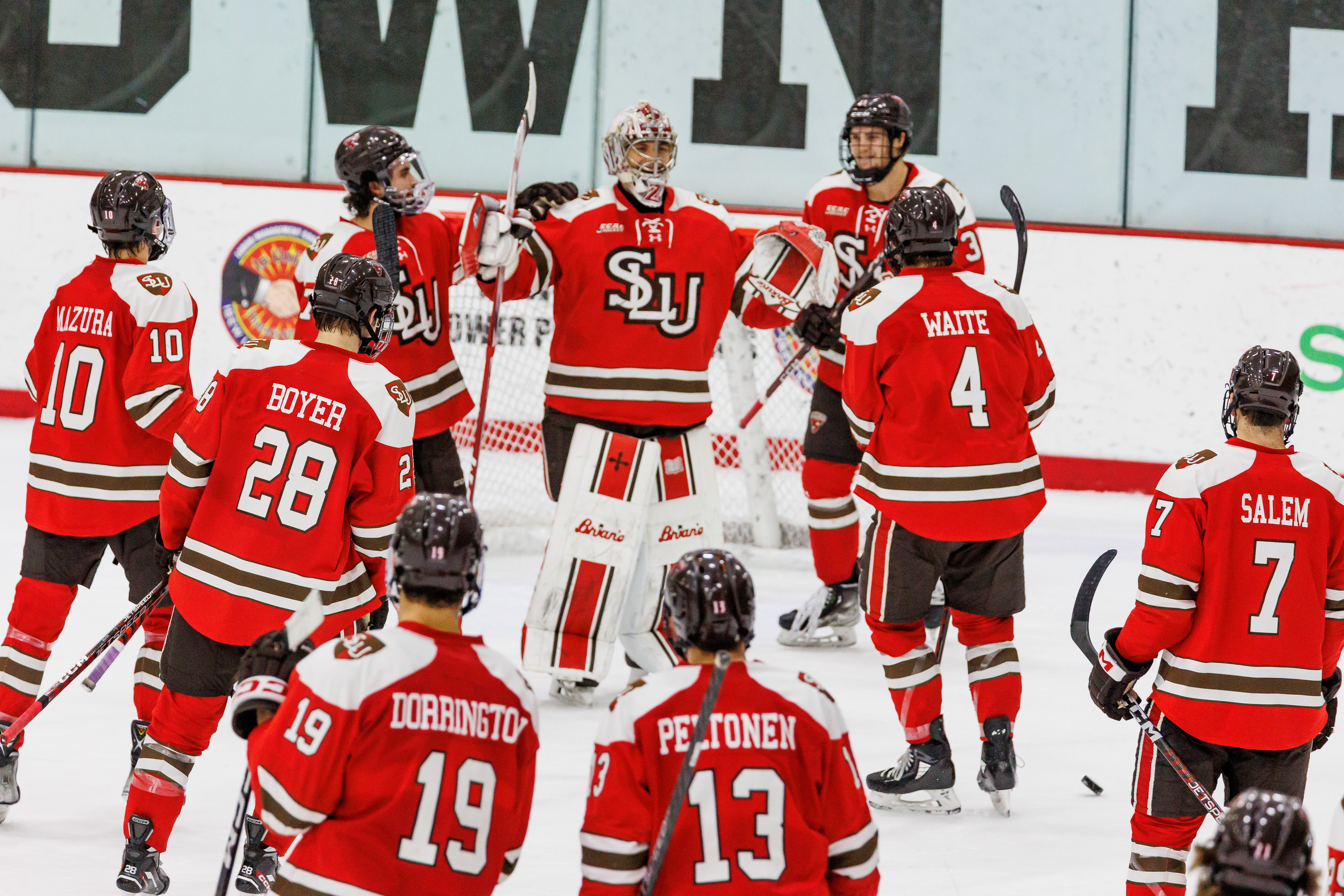
Saints celebrate a win over the Brown Bears in 2023

The St. Lawrence Saints Men's Ice Hockey team, colloquially known as the "Skating Saints", is a National Collegiate Athletic Association (NCAA) Division I college ice hockey program that represents St. Lawrence University. The Saints are a member of the ECAC Hockey. They have played at Appleton Arena in Canton, New York, since 1951. Prior to the arena's construction, the men's team played outdoors at the current location of Whitman Hall.

== History ==
Since the team's inception in 1925, the Saints men's hockey program has been a competitive team at the top ranks of American college hockey. Due to World War II, there were no teams during the 1941–42 season, or the 1943–44 through 1945–46 seasons.

The team plays in the ECAC Hockey League, one of six Division I leagues. This league currently boasts six Ivy League teams, including perennial powers Cornell and Harvard as well as six colleges from upstate New York and Connecticut. Since the inception of the ECAC in 1961, SLU has won six ECAC tournament titles and two ECAC regular season titles.

Since the 1951–52 season, SLU has made sixteen NCAA tournament appearances. St. Lawrence has been to the Frozen Four and its antecedent the four team NCAA Championships a total of nine times, playing in the title games in 1961 and 1988. St. Lawrence has accomplished this despite being, at approximately 2,000 students, one of the smallest colleges to play at the Division I level. A Division III school in all other sports, St. Lawrence has maintained Division I "play-up" status in hockey thanks to a 2004 NCAA resolution, allowing it (along with 11 other schools) to offer Division I scholarships in only one sport. St. Lawrence did not offer grant-in-aid hockey scholarships until the mid-1990s.

In 1988, the Saints played in the NCAA national championship game at the Olympic Arena in Lake Placid, NY, losing to Lake Superior State University 4–3 in overtime. The 1987–88 season was the most successful in team history, with an overall record of 29–9–0. In 2000, the Saints played in the longest NCAA tournament game on record; a 3–2, quadruple overtime victory over Boston University. The win advanced the Saints to the Frozen Four, where the team eventually lost to Boston College in the National Semifinals. The Men's program has produced 28 All-American players, seven ECAC tournament MVPs, six ECAC players of the year, four ECAC rookies of the year, and nine Hobey Baker Memorial Award finalists.

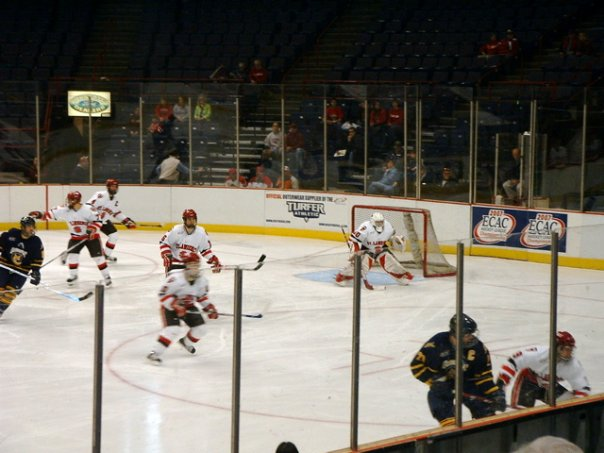
Saints vs. Quinnipiac Bobcats, 2007

From 1985 until 2012, Joe Marsh was the head coach at St. Lawrence. In 2007, he won his 400th Division I game (all at St. Lawrence) placing him in 6th place among active NCAA Division I coaches in career wins. Marsh is a two-time winner of the Spencer Penrose Award given to the best college coach of the year.

Following Marsh's retirement in 2012, former Ottawa Senators assistant coach, and Saints alumnus, Greg Carvel took over head coaching duties. In 2016, Carvel departed the program to take the same role at the University of Massachusetts. Following the departure of Carvel, St. Lawrence named former Clarkson University head coach Mark Morris as the 14th head coach in program history.

Beginning with the 2019–20 season, the Saints announced Brent Brekke as the 15th head coach in program history.

St. Lawrence's biggest hockey rival is Clarkson University, located in Potsdam, ten miles from the St. Lawrence campus. For many years, the swing through the North Country has been considered to be one of the most grueling road trips in college hockey.

St. Lawrence plays its home hockey games at Appleton Arena, a classic old time hockey barn which has seen many upgrades since opening in 1950 with a 4–2 St. Lawrence win over Dartmouth College.

== Season-by-season results ==
Source:

== Records vs. current ECAC Hockey teams ==
As of the completion of the 2018–19 season

School	Team	Away Arena	Overall record	Win %	Last Result
Brown University	Bears	Meehan Auditorium	48–30–13	.599	1-3 L
Clarkson University	Golden Knights	Cheel Arena	72–127–11	.369	0-3 L
Colgate University	Raiders	Class of 1965 Arena	80–72–5	.525	5-2 W
Cornell University	Big Red	Lynah Rink	45–64–17	.425	2-4 L
Dartmouth College	Big Green	Thompson Arena	61–42–4	.589	0-8 L
Harvard University	Crimson	Bright-Landry Hockey Center	44–62–7	.420	2-3 L
Princeton University	Tigers	Hobey Baker Memorial Rink	70–25–11	.712	3-5 L
Quinnipiac University	Bobcats	People's United Center	15–15–4	.500	2-7 L
Rensselaer Polytechnic Institute	Engineers	Houster Field House	83–60–7	.577	5-6 L
Union College	Garnet Chargers	Achilles Rink	38–29–3	.564	3-4 L
Yale University	Bulldogs	Ingalls Rink	64–41–11	.599	2-3 L

== Coaches ==
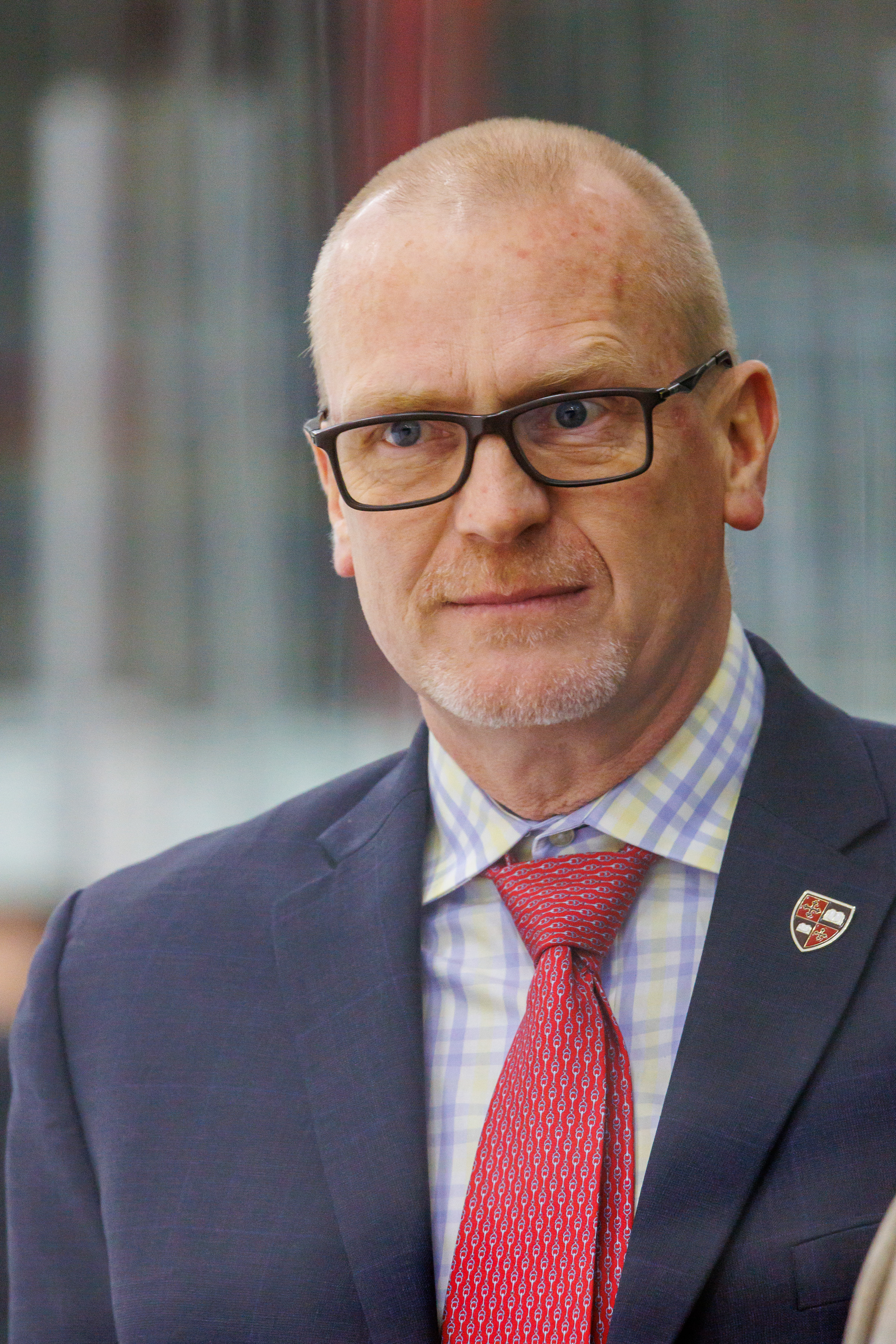
Brent Brekke

As of completion of the 2024–25 season

Tenure	Coach	Years	Record	Pct.
1925–1926	D. F. McCarthy	1	0–2–0	.000
1926–1928	Degre Formoza	2	5–6–0	.455
1929–1930	James Mallon	1	3–8–1	.292
1938–1941	Alfred Sheard	3	4–19–0	.174
1946–1947	Jack Klemens	1	3–3–0	.500
1947–1950	Paul Patten	3	20–5–0	.800
1950–1955	Olav Kollevoll	5	72–25–2	.737
1955–1967, 1968–1971	George Menard	15	204–137–14	.594
1967–1968, 1971–1976	Bernie McKinnon	6	72–84–6	.463
1976–1979	Leon Abbott	4†	31–67–2	.320
1979–1980	Dale Henwood	1†	3–18–0	.143
1980–1985	Mike McShane	5	93–65–6	.530
1985–2012	Joe Marsh	26	482–418–75	.533
2012–2016	Greg Carvel	4	72–63–15	.530
2016–2019	Mark Morris	3	31–69–11	.329
2019–Present	Brent Brekke	6	61–116–23	.363
Totals	15 coaches	84 Seasons	1,157–1,109–155	.510

† Leon Abbott resigned in December 1979 and Dale Henwood served as the interim coach for the remainder of the season.

== Uniforms ==
Traditionally, the Saints home jersey is white with scarlet shoulders and brown trim. The end of the sleeves and bottom of the sweater feature scarlet and brown stripes. The school's crest and the player's name and number all appear in scarlet with brown trim. The road jersey are identically designed, but with the white and scarlet portions reversed. In 2002, a lace-up neck was adopted by the men's team.

In 2001, in honor of Appleton Arena's 50th anniversary, an alternate "throw-back" jersey was introduced for the men's team. The alternate jersey is white but does not feature colored shoulders. The StL logo is significantly smaller, and "St. Lawrence" is spelled out across the chest. The school seal also appears on both shoulders of the sweater. This jersey continued to be used occasionally until gaining popularity during the 2006–07 season, when the men's team exhibited frequent success when wearing the alternate jerseys on home ice. As a result, the alternate jersey quickly became the staple home jersey. Beginning with the 2012–13 season, St. Lawrence retired the StL logo from the red road jerseys as well, and adopted a design that matched the home white sweaters.

Originally, the women's program wore jerseys that were identical to the men's jerseys. However, in fall 2005, the women's jerseys were designed to be unique from the men's jerseys. The scarlet and brown on the shoulders of the home jersey was extended down the arms until it met with the trim at the end of the sleeve. The player's number appears within the scarlet portion and is white with brown trim. The road jerseys feature a similar pattern, but the shoulders and sleeves are brown with white trim (a reverse of the traditional road-jersey scheme) on a red background.

In tribute to Mike Pelletier and Rich Stewart, teammates on the 1988 NCAA finalist team who were among the victims of the September 11, 2001, terrorist attacks, the 2001–02 men's team wore a patch on the shoulder of their jerseys with both players' initials. Pelletier and Stewart had both been employees of Cantor Fitzgerald working in the World Trade Center.

In the 2008–09 season, St. Lawrence, along with all other ECAC Hockey teams, participated in Coaches vs. Cancer's "Pink at the Rink" fundraiser. The Men's team wore black sweaters with pink and white trim while the Women's team wore pink uniforms with white trim. The jerseys, along with pink ties worn by the coaches and pink sticks were then auctioned off to raise funds for breast cancer research. (The Men's team only wore the pink jerseys during warmups, as visiting team Harvard had forgotten to bring their home white jerseys.)

== Traditions ==
- Whenever a goal is scored, the crowd will sing "When the Saints Go Marching In" immediately after the goal is announced. A skating saint sign at each end of the arena flashes as well.
- When the final minute of the period is announced, fans respond by yelling "And Clarkson Still Sucks!" referring to St Lawrence's nearby rival school. This same cheer is often used by fans at Rensselaer, whose rivalry with Clarkson stems from being another engineering school in the ECAC Hockey, and not from geographic location.
- Due to St Lawrence's proximity to Canada, both the American and Canadian national anthems are played prior to home games. Many fans will shout the word "saints" over the final word of the American national anthem. This is a shared tradition among schools in the ECAC Hockey; notably Clarkson fans and Cornell fans will shout "knights" and "red," respectively, when those words appear in the anthem's lyrics.
- Since the fall of 1999, students have brought a school flag into the stands to wave when team takes the ice and when they score. Cowbells have also become popular among fans (possibly due to the large population of dairy farmers in the region), and are sold at the school's bookstore, with the St. Lawrence University crest printed on them.
- In the early to mid 1990s, when the Saints scored a goal near the student section, some students would lob rubber chickens toward the goal.
- In the early to mid 1990s, many students brought newspapers to the game. During the introduction of the visiting team, students would hold up the newspapers and pretend to read. When the introductions shifted to the Saints, the newspaper was quickly balled up and thrown into the air as the crowd started cheering for the home team.
- In the early to mid 1990s, when penalties to the visiting team were announced over the PA system in the arena, the final part of the announcement would be shouted over. “Clarkson penalty to number 16. Two minutes for—-“ The crowd would interrupt in unison “for being an a—-hole.”

== Statistical leaders ==
=== Career points leaders ===
Player	Years	GP	G	A	Pts	PIM
Pete Lappin	1984–1988	131	85	102	187	148
Greg Carey	2010–2014	152	84	101	185	123
Brian McFarlane	1951–1955	73	101	84	185	
Doug Crawford	1975–1979		71	112	183	
Paul DiFrancesco	1994–1998	136	62	119	181	230
Burke Murphy	1992–1996	130	99	75	174	172
Terry Slater	1958–1961	76	75	92	167	33
Andy Pritchard	1987–1991	117	80	82	162	136
T. J. Trevelyan	2002–2006	150	78	76	154	204
Joe Day	1986–1990	132	72	81	153	133

=== Career goaltending leaders ===
GP = Games played; Min = Minutes played; W = Wins; L = Losses; T = Ties; GA = Goals against; SO = Shutouts; SV% = Save percentage; GAA = Goals against average

Minimum 30 games played

Player	Years	GP	Min	W	L	T	GA	SO	SV%	GAA
Kyle Hayton	2014–2017	104	6267	54	37	13	218	13	.934	2.09
Alex Petizian	2006–2010	86	4967	45	29	10	209	4	.913	2.52
Bill Sloan	1952–1956	85	4838	65	18	2	206	9	.902	2.55
Kain Tisi	2006–2010	46	2437	16	19	4	104	2	.907	2.56
Eric Heffler	1995–1999	79	4249	32	29	8	197	2	.919	2.75

Statistics current through the start of the 2023–24 season.

== Roster ==
As of August 9, 2025.

No.	Nat.	Player	Class	Pos	Height	Weight	DoB	Hometown	Previous team	NHL rights
1	(United States)	Cameron Smith	Junior	G	6' 2" (1.88 m)	175 lb (79 kg)	2002-01-21	Eastchester, New York	P.A.L. Jr. Islanders (NCDC)	—
2	(United States)	Teddy Mallgrave	Freshman	D	6' 3" (1.91 m)	201 lb (91 kg)	2005-04-26	Summit, New Jersey	Waterloo Black Hawks (USHL)	—
3	(United States)	Evan Orloff	Sophomore	D	6' 3" (1.91 m)	194 lb (88 kg)	2003-03-09	Kensington, Maryland	Maine Nordiques (NAHL)	—
4	(United States)	Andrew Brown	Freshman	D	5' 11" (1.8 m)	187 lb (85 kg)	2005-07-01	Oakville, Ontario	Cape Breton Eagles (QMJHL)	—
7	(United States)	Sam Hall	Sophomore	D	6' 2" (1.88 m)	174 lb (79 kg)	2004-12-16	Far Hills, New Jersey	Okotoks Oilers (BCHL)	—
8	(Canada)	Sam LeDrew	Freshman	F	6' 1" (1.85 m)	181 lb (82 kg)	2005-03-19	Stillwater Lake, Nova Scotia	West Kelowna Warriors (BCHL)	—
9	(Czech Republic)	Filip Juříček	Freshman	F	5' 10" (1.78 m)	170 lb (77 kg)	2004-12-04	Ostrava, Czech Republic	Jokerit U20 (U20 SM-sarja)	—
11	(Finland)	Rasmus Svartström	Freshman	F	6' 5" (1.96 m)	201 lb (91 kg)	2005-11-24	Helsinki, Finland	Cranbrook Bucks (BCHL)	—
12	(Slovakia)	Jakub Kopecký	Freshman	F	6' 3" (1.91 m)	194 lb (88 kg)	2004-02-08	Grand Rapids, Michigan	Bismarck Bobcats (NAHL)	—
13	(United States)	Cooper Pierson	Freshman	F	5' 9" (1.75 m)	176 lb (80 kg)	2005-01-06	Zionsville, Indiana	Brooks Bandits (BCHL)	—
14	(United States)	Cayden Casey	Sophomore	F	6' 1" (1.85 m)	174 lb (79 kg)	2004-10-07	Elk River, Minnesota	Cedar Rapids RoughRiders (USHL)	—
15	(Canada)	Evan Mitchell	Junior	D	5' 11" (1.8 m)	185 lb (84 kg)	2002-02-13	Winnipeg, Manitoba	Cranbrook Bucks (BCHL)	—
16	(United States)	Sam Frandina	Freshman	D	5' 9" (1.75 m)	170 lb (77 kg)	2004-04-08	Hanover, New Hampshire	Coquitlam Express (BCHL)	—
17	(Sweden)	Gabe Westling	Sophomore	F	6' 4" (1.93 m)	203 lb (92 kg)	2003-10-18	Mora, Sweden	Nanaimo Clippers (BCHL)	—
18	(Canada)	Tyler Cristall	Senior	F	5' 9" (1.75 m)	170 lb (77 kg)	2002-05-13	Vancouver, British Columbia	West Kelowna Warriors (NAHL)	—
19	(United States)	Jacob Bernadet	Sophomore	F	5' 10" (1.78 m)	161 lb (73 kg)	2003-09-12	South Burlington, Vermont	Maine Nordiques (NAHL)	—
20	(Canada)	Frankie Carogioiello	Senior	F	5' 10" (1.78 m)	173 lb (78 kg)	2002-06-21	Woodbridge, Ontario	Miami (NCHC)	—
21	(Canada)	Isack Bandu	Senior	D	6' 2" (1.88 m)	195 lb (88 kg)	2001-05-03	Montreal, Quebec	Northern Michigan (CCHA)	—
22	(United States)	Luke Santilli	Freshman	F	6' 4" (1.93 m)	212 lb (96 kg)	2004-12-05	Reading, Massachusetts	Youngstown Phantoms (USHL)	—
23	(United States)	Jan Olenginski	Junior	F	5' 9" (1.75 m)	165 lb (75 kg)	2003-03-23	Philadelphia, Pennsylvania	Madison Capitols (USHL)	—
24	(Canada)	Spencer Bell	Sophomore	F	6' 0" (1.83 m)	190 lb (86 kg)	2003-10-04	Warman, Saskatchewan	Humboldt Broncos (SJHL)	—
25	(United States)	Jack Babbage	Graduate	D	6' 1" (1.85 m)	185 lb (84 kg)	2000-08-30	Tully, New York	New Hampshire (HEA)	—
26	(United States)	Jake Lammens	Junior	D	6' 1" (1.85 m)	185 lb (84 kg)	2002-10-03	Norwalk, Connecticut	Salmon Arm Silverbacks (BCHL)	—
27	(Canada)	Isaac Tremblay	Sophomore	F	6' 1" (1.85 m)	170 lb (77 kg)	2004-09-24	Granby, Quebec	Vernon Vipers (BCHL)	—
28	(Canada)	Nicholas Beneteau	Sophomore	F	6' 3" (1.91 m)	192 lb (87 kg)	2003-09-12	Windsor, Ontario	Alberni Valley Bulldogs (BCHL)	—
29	(United States)	Gunnar Thoreson	Junior	F	5' 10" (1.78 m)	185 lb (84 kg)	2002-03-19	Andover, Minnesota	Minnesota Wilderness (NAHL)	—
31	(United States)	Colin Winn	Freshman	G	6' 1" (1.85 m)	194 lb (88 kg)	2004-08-05	Westford, Massachusetts	Alberni Valley Bulldogs (BCHL)	—
32	(United States)	Mason Kucenski	Junior	G	6' 3" (1.91 m)	175 lb (79 kg)	2002-04-08	Gill, Massachusetts	Madison Capitols (USHL)	—
33	(United States)	Jack Wieneke	Sophomore	G	6' 1" (1.85 m)	185 lb (84 kg)	2003-03-08	Plymouth, Minnesota	Lone Star Brahmas (NAHL)	—
34	(Slovakia)	Ján Lašák	Senior	F	6' 1" (1.85 m)	200 lb (91 kg)	2002-08-11	Šurany, Slovakia	Janesville Jets (NAHL)	—

== Awards and honors ==
=== Hockey Hall of Fame ===
- Bill Torrey (1995)
- Brian McFarlane (1995)

=== United States Hockey Hall of Fame ===
- Ron Mason (2013)

=== NCAA ===
==== Individual awards ====
Hobey Baker Award Finalists

- Peter Lappin: 1988
- Daniel Laperrière: 1992
- Burke Murphy: 1996
- Eric Heffler: 1999
- Erik Anderson: 2001
- T. J. Trevelyan: 2006
- Drew Bagnall: 2007
- Kyle Flanagan: 2013
- Greg Carey: 2013, 2014

Spencer Penrose Award

- Joe Marsh: 1989, 2000

==== All-Americans ====
AHCA First Team All-Americans

- 1954–55: Bill Sloan, G
- 1956–57: Pat Presley, D
- 1958–59: Pat Presley, D
- 1959–60: Terry Slater, F
- 1960–61: Arlie Parker, D; Terry Slater, F
- 1961–62: Arlie Parker, D
- 1962–63: Richie Broadbelt, G
- 1963–64: Bob Perani, G
- 1982–83: Gray Weicker, G
- 1987–88: Brian McColgan, D; Pete Lappin, F
- 1988–89: Mike Hurlbut, D
- 1990–91: Les Kuntar, G
- 1991–92: Daniel Laperrière, D
- 1998–99: Eric Heffler, G
- 1999–00: Justin Harney, D
- 2000–01: Erik Anderson, F
- 2005–06: T. J. Trevelyan, F
- 2006–07: Drew Bagnall, D
- 2008–09: Zach Miskovic, D
- 2012–13: Kyle Flanagan, F
- 2013–14: Greg Carey, F

AHCA Second Team All-Americans

- 1953–54: Bill Sloan, G
- 1955–56: Bill Sloan, G; Chuck Lundberg, D; Ed Zifcak, F
- 1956–57: Joe McLean, F
- 1986–87: Scott Yearwood, G; Pete Lappin, F
- 1991–92: Mike Lappin, F
- 1995–96: Burke Murphy, F
- 1999–00: Brandon Dietrich, F
- 2000–01: Matt Desrosiers, D
- 2012–13: George Hughes, D; Greg Carey, F
- 2015–16: Gavin Bayreuther, D
- 2016–17: Kyle Hayton, G; Gavin Bayreuther, D

=== ECAC Hockey ===
==== Individual awards ====
Player of the Year

- Pete Lappin: 1988
- Daniel Laperrière: 1992
- Eric Heffler: 1999
- Erik Anderson: 2001
- T. J. Trevelyan: 2006
- Drew Bagnall: 2007
- Greg Carey: 2014

Best Defensive Forward

- Greg Carvel: 1993
- Joel Prpic: 1997
- Mike Gellard: 2001
- Kyle Rank: 2007
- Travis Vermeulen: 2010

Best Defensive Defenseman

- Arlie Parker: 1962
- Jeff Kungle: 1996
- Justin Harney: 2000
- Mike Madill: 2006
- Drew Bagnall: 2007
- Matt Generous: 2009

Rookie of the Year

- Burke Murphy: 1993
- Paul DiFrancesco: 1995
- Brandon Dietrich: 1999
- Derek Gustafson: 2000
- Gavin Bayreuther: 2014
- Kyle Hayton: 2015

Ken Dryden Award

- Eric Heffler: 1999
- Kyle Hayton: 2017

Ken Dryden Award

- Joe Marsh: 1989, 1996, 1999, 2007
- Greg Carvel: 2015

Most Outstanding Player in tournament

- Arlie Parker: 1962
- Bob Perani: 1964
- Pete Lappin: 1988
- Doug Murray: 1989
- Daniel Laperrière: 1992
- Derek Gustafson: 2000
- Jeremy Symington: 2001
- David Jankowski: 2021

==== All-Conference ====
First Team All-ECAC Hockey

- 1961–62: Arlie Parker, D; Ron Mason, F
- 1962–63: Richie Broadbelt, G; Ron Mason, F
- 1963–64: Bob Perani, G; Jim Salfi, D
- 1967–68: Gary Croteau, F
- 1987–88: Brian McColgan, D; Pete Lappin, F
- 1988–89: Mike Hurlbut, D
- 1990–91: Les Kuntar, G; Andy Pritchard, F
- 1991–92: Daniel Laperrière, D; Mike Lappin, F
- 1995–96: Burke Murphy, F
- 1998–99: Eric Heffler, G
- 1999–00: Brandon Dietrich, F
- 2000–01: Matt Desrosiers, D; Erik Anderson, F; Mike Gellard, F
- 2003–04: Ryan Glenn, D
- 2004–05: T. J. Trevelyan, F
- 2005–06: Mike Madill, D; T. J. Trevelyan, F
- 2006–07: Drew Bagnall, D; Kyle Rank, F
- 2008–09: Zach Miskovic, D
- 2012–13: George Hughes, D; Greg Carey, F; Kyle Flanagan, F
- 2013–14: Greg Carey, F
- 2015–16: Gavin Bayreuther, D
- 2016–17: Kyle Hayton, G; Gavin Bayreuther, D
- 2020–21: Cameron Buhl, F

Second Team All-ECAC Hockey

- 1961–62: Richie Broadbelt, G; Rollie Anderson, F
- 1963–64: Arnie O'Reilly, F; Dave Ross, F
- 1982–83: Gray Weicker, D; Kent Carlson, D
- 1984–85: Steve Tuite, D
- 1986–87: Scott Yearwood, G; Hank Lammens, D; Pete Lappin, F
- 1987–88: Hank Lammens, D
- 1988–89: Mike Bishop, D
- 1989–90: Joe Day, F
- 1990–91: Daniel Laperrière, D
- 1992–93: Ted Beattie, D
- 1994–95: Burke Murphy, F
- 1995–96: Jeff Kungle, D
- 1996–97: Paul DiFrancesco, F
- 1997–98: Paul DiFrancesco, F
- 1998–99: Bob Prier, F
- 1999–00: Derek Gustafson, G; Justin Harney, D; Erik Anderson, F
- 2006–07: Alex Petizian, G
- 2013–14: Gavin Bayreuther, D
- 2014–15: Kyle Hayton, G; Eric Sweetman, D
- 2015–16: Eric Sweetman, D
- 2022–23: Luc Salem, D

Third Team All-ECAC Hockey

- 2008–09: Brock McBride, F
- 2009–10: Derek Keller, D; Travis Vermeulen, F
- 2011–12: Kyle Flanagan, F

ECAC Hockey All-Rookie Team

- 1988–89: Shawn Rivers, D
- 1989–90: Greg Carvel, F
- 1990–91: Mike McCourt, D; Eric Lacroix, F
- 1992–93: Jeff Kungle, D; Burke Murphy, F
- 1993–94: Troy Creurer, D
- 1994–95: Paul DiFrancesco, F
- 1995–96: John Poapst, D
- 1998–99: Ray DiLauro, D; Brandon Dietrich, F
- 1999–00: Derek Gustafson, G
- 2002–03: John Zeiler, F
- 2003–04: Kyle Rank, F
- 2005–06: Matt Generous, D
- 2006–07: Alex Petizian, G
- 2009–10: George Hughes, D
- 2010–11: Greg Carey, F
- 2011–12: Chris Martin, F
- 2013–14: Gavin Bayreuther, D; Matt Carey, F
- 2014–15: Kyle Hayton, G; Nolan Gluchowski, D
- 2020–21: Luc Salem, D; Greg Lapointe, F

== Olympians ==
This is a list of St. Lawrence alumni who have played on an Olympic team.

Name	Position	St. Lawrence Tenure	Team	Year	Finish
Richie Broadbelt	Goaltender	1960–1963	(Canada) CAN	1964	4th

- Hank Lammens also participated in the 1992 Summer Olympics in sailing.

== St. Lawrence Saints Hall of Fame ==
The following is a list of people associated with the St. Lawrence men's ice hockey program who were elected into the St. Lawrence University Athletic Hall of Fame.

- Erik Anderson (2019)
- Oliver Appleton (1982)
- Richie Broadbelt (2000)
- John M. Burger (2005)
- Gary Croteau (1990)
- Kevin Dougherty (1991)
- Jack Klemens (1980)
- Hank Lammens (2015)
- Daniel Laperrière (2013)
- Pete Lappin (2008)
- Al MacCormack (2002)
- Ron Mason (1999)
- Brian McColgan (2015)
- Brian McFarlane (1985)
- Bernie McKinnon (2000)
- Burke Murphy (2017)
- Arlie Parker (1988)
- Pat Presley (1987)
- Jesse Sammis (1985)
- Terry Slater (1986)
- Bill Sloan (1986)
- The Ottawa Connection (1993):
  Ron O'Brien
  Joe McLean
  Lee Fournier
- Bill Torrey (1996)
- Lawrence Traynor (1983)

== Saints in the NHL ==
As of July 1, 2025.

= NHL All-Star team	= NHL All-Star	= NHL All-Star and NHL All-Star team	= Hall of Famers

Player	Position	Team(s)	Years	Games	Stanley Cups
Drew Bagnall	Defenseman	MIN	2010–2011	2	0
Jamie Baker	Center	QUE, OTT, SJS, TOR	1989–1999	404	0
Gavin Bayreuther	Defenseman	DAL, CBJ	2018–2023	122	0
Brandon Bollig	Left Wing	CHI , CGY	2011–2016	241	1
Matt Carey	Left Wing	CHI	2013–2014	2	0
Kent Carlson	Defenseman	MTL, STL, WSH	1983–1989	113	0
Dale Clarke	Defenseman	STL	2000–2001	3	0
Gary Croteau	Left Wing	LAK, DET, CAL, KCS, COR	1968–1980	684	0
Joe Day	Center	HFD, NYI	1991–1994	72	0
Michael Gaul	Defenseman	COL, CBJ	1998–2001	3	0
Derek Gustafson	Goaltender	MIN	2000–2002	5	0
Mike Hurlbut	Center	NYR, QUE, BUF	1992–2000	29	0
Les Kuntar	Goaltender	MTL	1993–1994	6	0

Player	Position	Team(s)	Years	Games	Stanley Cups
Eric Lacroix	Left Wing	TOR, LAK, COL, NYR, OTT	1993–2001	472	0
Hank Lammens	Right Wing	OTT	1993–1994	27	0
Daniel Laperrière	Defenseman	STL, OTT	1992–1996	48	0
Pete Lappin	Right Wing	MNS, SJS	1989–1992	7	0
Gary Laskoski	Goaltender	LAK	1982–1984	59	0
Mike McKenna	Goaltender	TBL, NJD, CBJ, ARI, DAL, OTT, PHI	2008–2019	35	0
Kevin O'Shea	Forward	BUF, STL	1970–1973	134	0
Rich Peverley	Center	NSH, ATL, BOS, DAL	2006–2014	442	1
Joel Prpic	Center	BOS, COL	1997–2001	18	0
Shawn Rivers	Defenseman	TBL	1992–1993	4	0
David Saunders	Left Wing	VAN	1987–1988	56	0
John Zeiler	Center	LAK	2006–2011	90	0

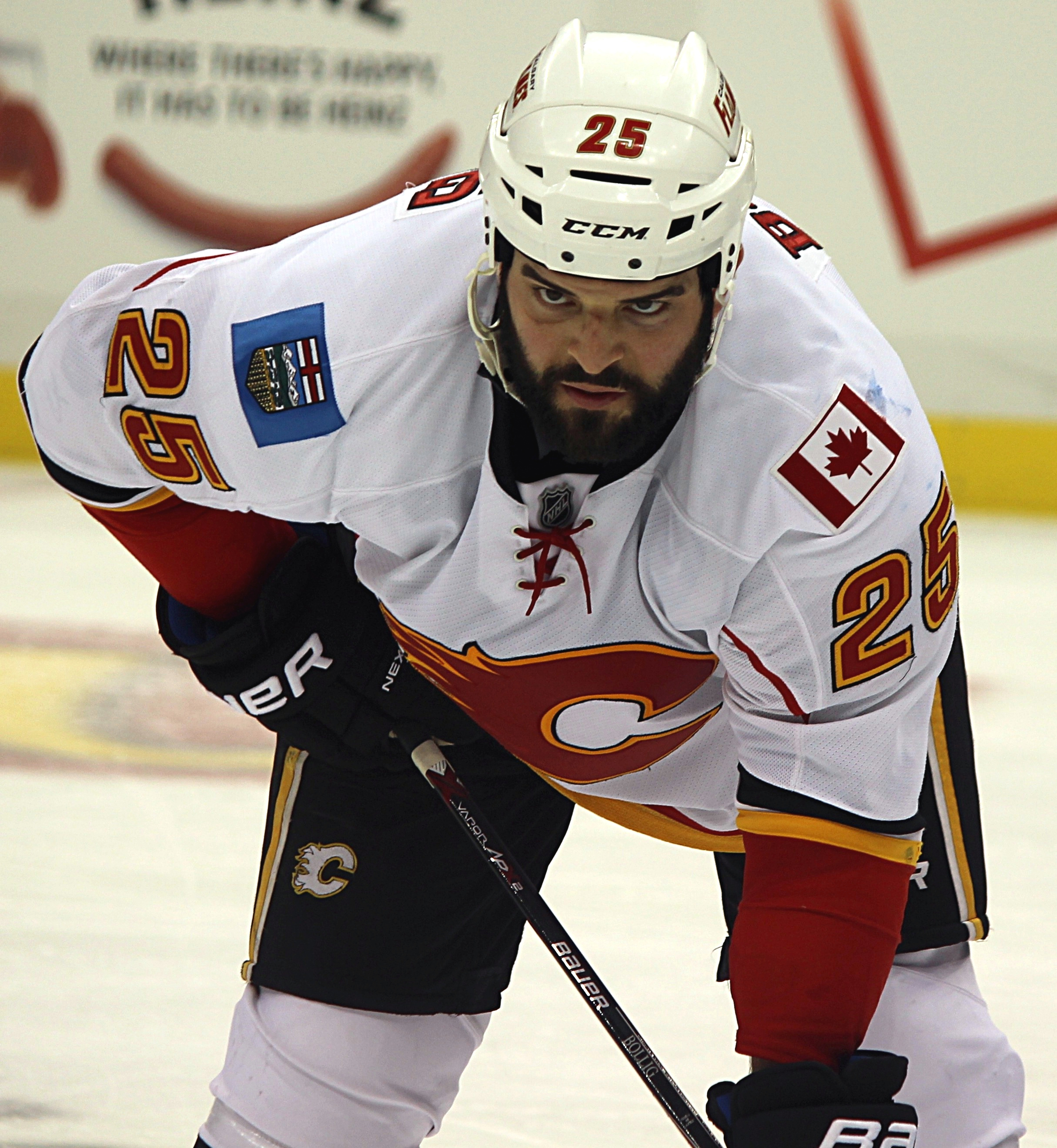
Brandon Bollig

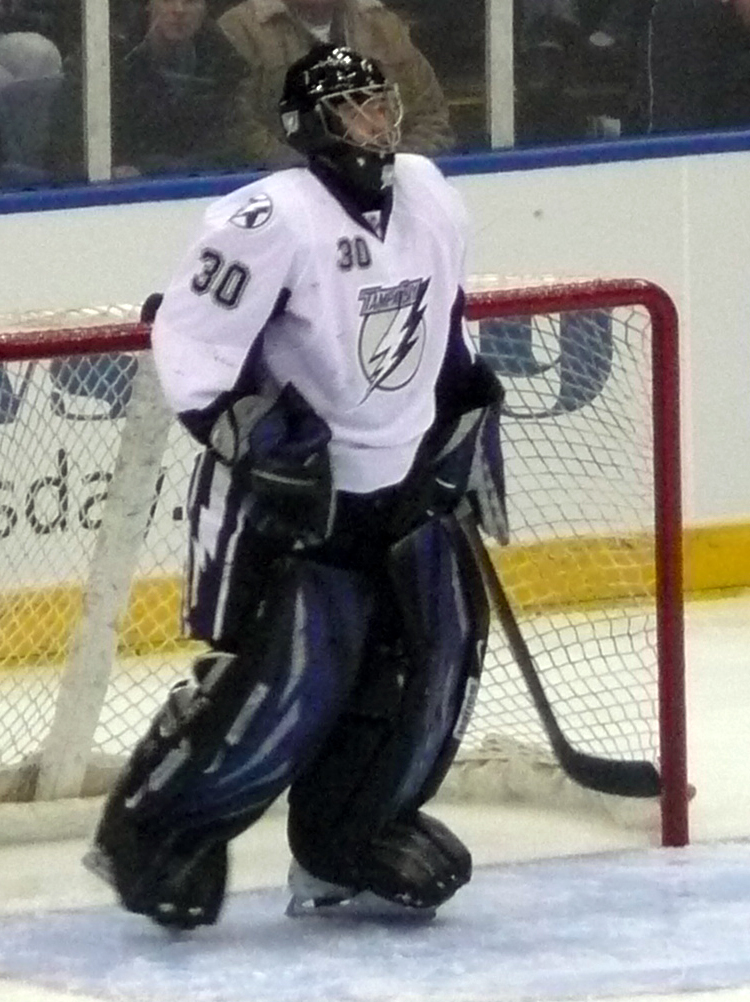
Mike McKenna

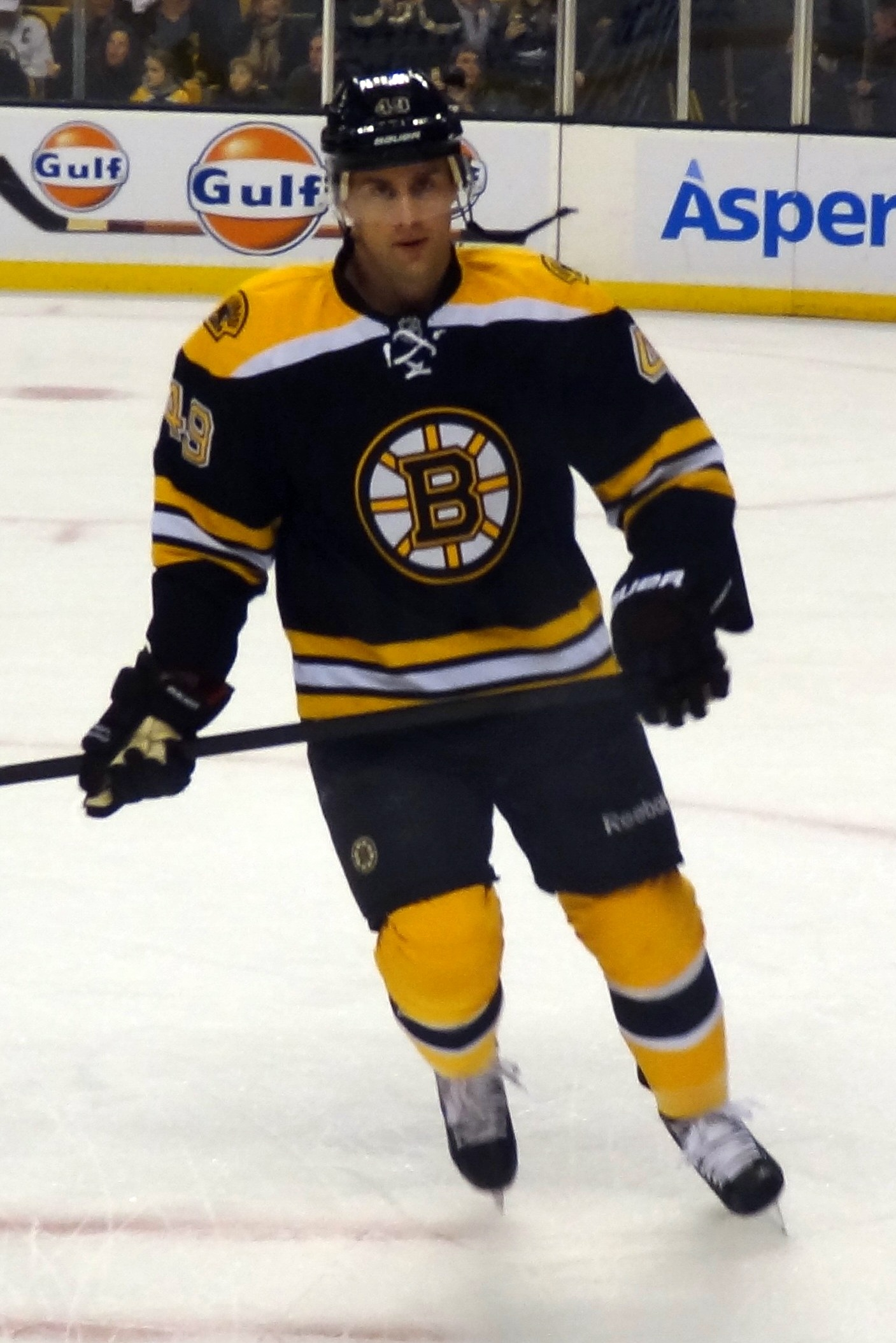
Rich Peverley

== See also ==
- St. Lawrence Saints women's ice hockey
