= T.J. Trevelyan =

Canadian ice hockey player

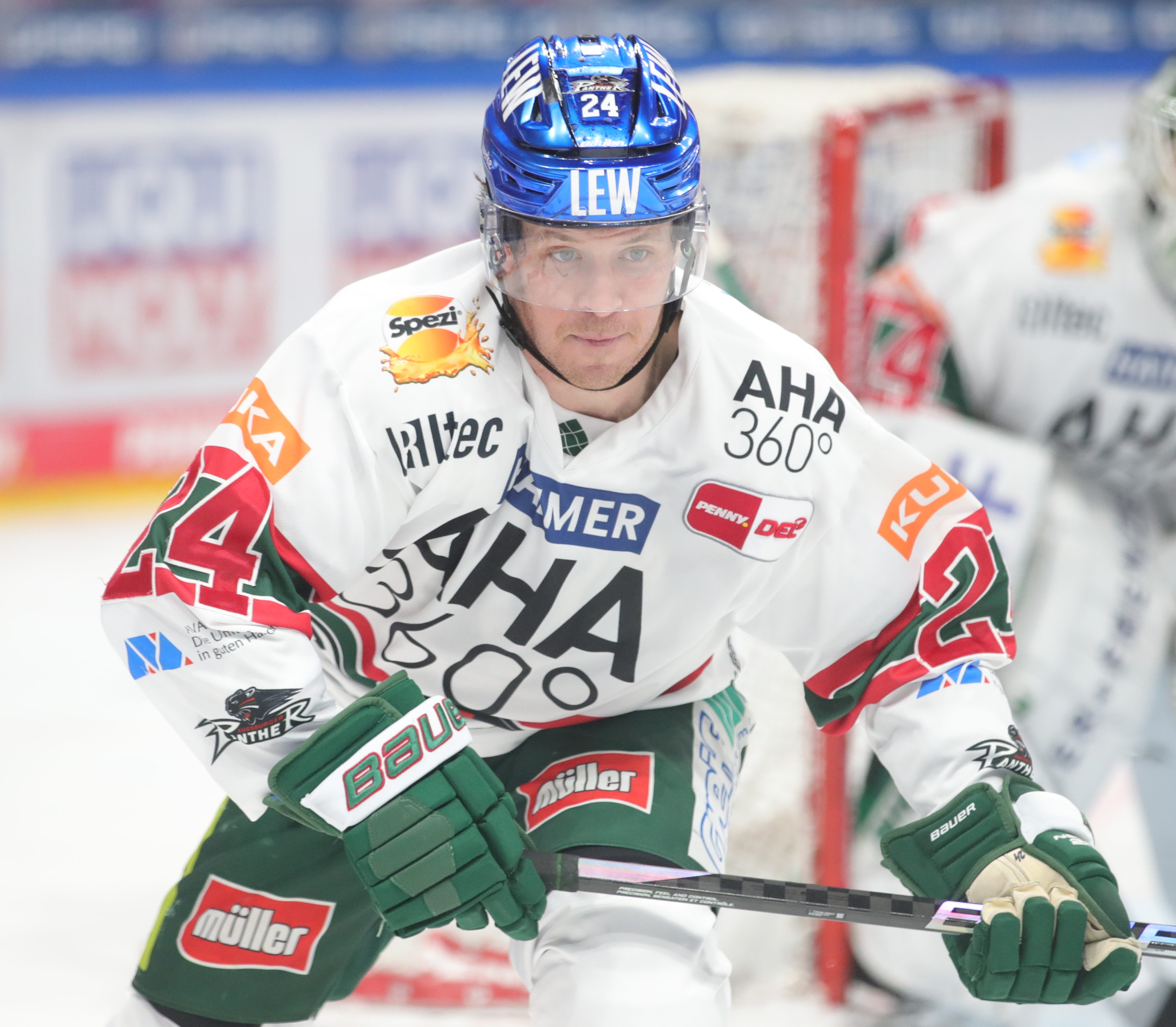
- Trevelyan in 2023
- Born: March 6, 1984 (age 42) Mississauga, Ontario, Canada
- Height: 5 ft 9 in (175 cm)
- Weight: 179 lb (81 kg; 12 st 11 lb)
- Position: Left wing
- Shoots: Left
- DEL team Former teams: Augsburger Panther; Providence Bruins; Iowa Chops; Worcester Sharks
- NHL draft: Undrafted
- Playing career: 2006–present

Thomas Jordan Trevelyan (born March 6, 1984) is a Canadian of Cornish descent professional ice hockey player for the Augsburger Panther of the Deutsche Eishockey Liga (DEL).

== Playing career ==
Trevelyan was a 2006 graduate of Saint Lawrence University. During his National Collegiate Athletic Association career, Trevelyan was named to the ECAC All-Star Team in 2005 and 2006, as well as being named the ECAC Player of the Year in 2006. He was also named an NCAA First Team All-American in 2006. On August 26, 2006 Trevelyan signed a multi-year entry-level contract with the Boston Bruins. In 2008, Trevelyan was invited to training camp by the Anaheim Ducks, and spent the season in the American Hockey League (AHL) with Ducks affiliate the Iowa Chops.

On July 21, 2009, Trevelyan signed a one-year contract with the Worcester Sharks. Prior to the 2009–10 season he was invited to Worcester's NHL affiliate the San Jose Sharks training camp. Failing to make the Sharks' roster, Trevelyan returned to the AHL and led Worcester with 28 goals in just 63 games before leading Worcester with 4 goals in the playoffs. After an impressive season with the Sharks, Trevelyan was then signed to a one-year contract with the team on May 28, 2010.

On August 2, 2011, Trevelyan left North America and signed a contract with German team Augsburger Panther of the DEL.

== Career statistics ==
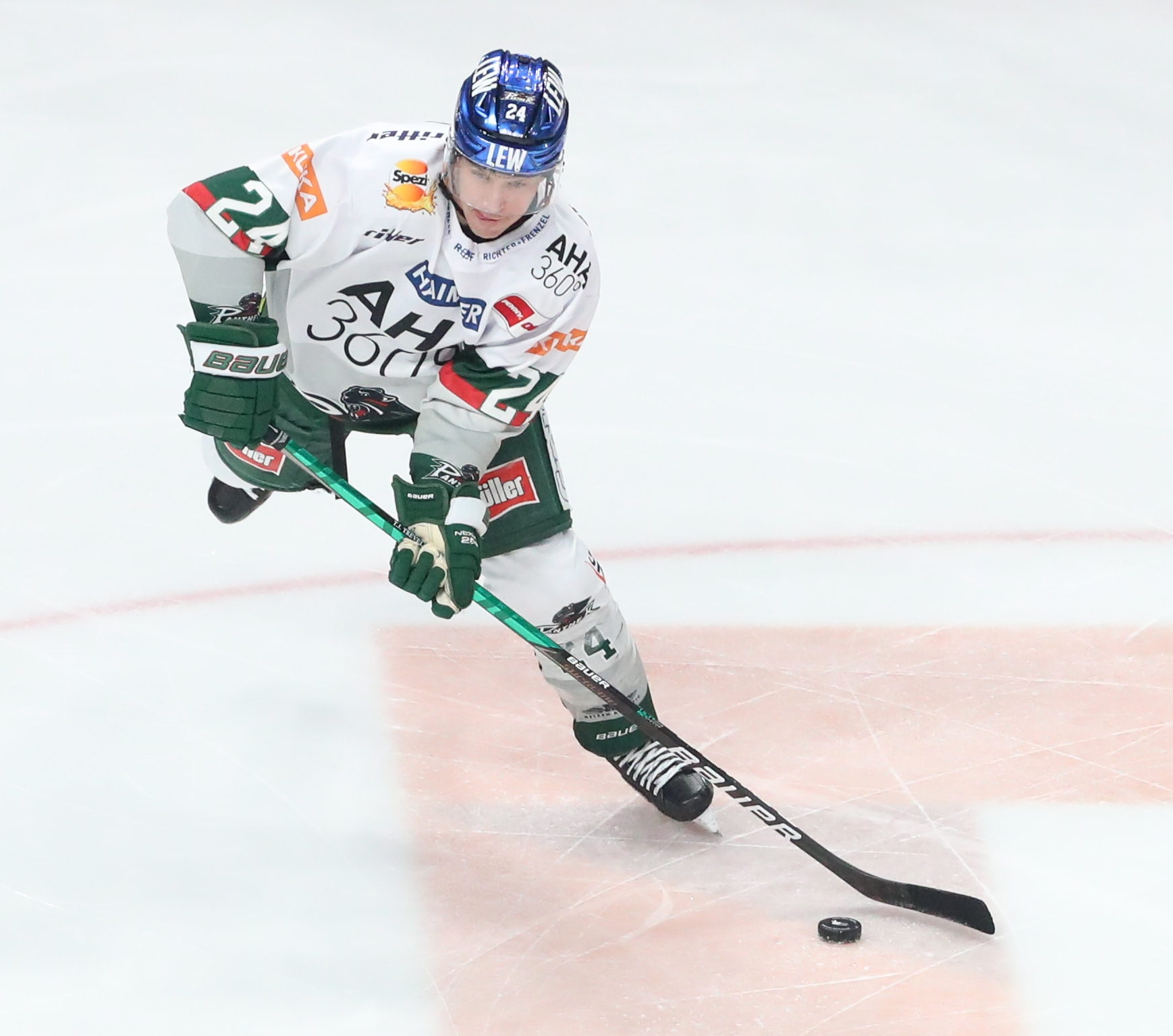
Trevelyan with Augsburg in 2022

			Regular season					Playoffs
Season	Team	League	GP	G	A	Pts	PIM	GP	G	A	Pts	PIM
2000–01	Georgetown Raiders	OPJHL	49	18	22	40	36	—	—	—	—	—
2001–02	Georgetown Raiders	OPJHL	49	37	39	76	58	—	—	—	—	—
2002–03	St. Lawrence University	ECAC	34	10	12	22	38	—	—	—	—	—
2003–04	St. Lawrence University	ECAC	38	23	16	39	62	—	—	—	—	—
2004–05	St. Lawrence University	ECAC	38	25	20	45	61	—	—	—	—	—
2005–06	St. Lawrence University	ECAC	40	20	28	48	23	—	—	—	—	—
2006–07	Long Beach Ice Dogs	ECHL	15	9	8	17	16	—	—	—	—	—
2006–07	Providence Bruins	AHL	60	28	20	58	41	13	3	6	9	12
2007–08	Providence Bruins	AHL	72	18	20	38	23	10	5	3	8	6
2008–09	Iowa Chops	AHL	76	23	24	47	18	—	—	—	—	—
2009–10	Worcester Sharks	AHL	63	28	16	44	16	8	4	2	6	2
2010–11	Worcester Sharks	AHL	73	19	21	40	31	—	—	—	—	—
2011–12	Augsburger Panther	DEL	49	6	15	21	12	—	—	—	—	—
2012–13	Augsburger Panther	DEL	44	16	11	27	28	—	—	—	—	—
2013–14	Augsburger Panther	DEL	34	19	9	28	6	—	—	—	—	—
2014–15	Augsburger Panther	DEL	45	17	12	29	16	—	—	—	—	—
2015–16	Augsburger Panther	DEL	30	13	12	25	12	—	—	—	—	—
2016–17	Augsburger Panther	DEL	30	12	10	22	0	6	1	2	3	6
2017–18	Augsburger Panther	DEL	40	8	10	18	18	—	—	—	—	—
2018–19	Augsburger Panther	DEL	37	5	10	15	18	4	0	1	1	20
2019–20	Augsburger Panther	DEL	38	13	6	19	12	—	—	—	—	—
2020–21	Augsburger Panther	DEL	32	8	11	19	4	—	—	—	—	—
2021–22	Augsburger Panther	DEL	35	10	3	13	12	—	—	—	—	—
2022–23	Augsburger Panther	DEL	45	4	9	13	17	—	—	—	—	—
2023–24	Augsburger Panther	DEL	41	14	8	22	8	—	—	—	—	—
2024–25	Augsburger Panther	DEL	32	8	8	16	6	—	—	—	—	—
AHL totals			344	116	106	222	129	31	12	11	23	20
DEL totals			532	153	134	287	169	10	1	3	4	26

== Awards and honours ==
Award	Year
College
All-ECAC Hockey First Team	2004–05, 2005–06
AHCA East First-Team All-American	2005–06

Awards and achievements
Preceded by David McKee	ECAC Hockey Player of the Year; 2005–06	Succeeded by Drew Bagnall
