= Mike Madill =

Canadian ice hockey player

- Born: May 9, 1982 (age 43) Kirkland, Quebec, Canada
- Height: 5 ft 11 in (180 cm)
- Weight: 194 lb (88 kg; 13 st 12 lb)
- Position: Defence
- Shot: Right
- Played for: AHL; Houston Aeros; Quad City Flames; Milwaukee Admirals; ECHL; Texas Wildcatters; Las Vegas Wranglers; ALH; Nippon Paper Cranes
- NHL draft: Undrafted
- Playing career: 2006–2013

Mike Madill (born May 9, 1982) is a Canadian former professional ice hockey defenceman. He was formerly General Manager and Head coach of the last professional team he played with, the Las Vegas Wranglers of the ECHL.

Madill attended St. Lawrence University where he played NCAA Division I hockey with the St. Lawrence Saints men's ice hockey team.

Madill spent the 2010–11 season playing in Japan with the Nippon Paper Cranes. On July 26, 2011, the Las Vegas Wranglers announced that Madill had re-signed with their ECHL team for the 2011–12 season.

== Awards and honors ==
Award	Year
All-ECAC Hockey First Team	2005–06

Awards and achievements
Preceded by Jaime Sifers	ECAC Hockey Best Defensive Defenseman; 2005–06	Succeeded by Drew Bagnall
