= Burke Murphy =

Canadian ice hockey player

- Born: June 5, 1973 (age 52) Gloucester, Ontario, Canada
- Height: 6 ft 0 in (183 cm)
- Weight: 180 lb (82 kg; 12 st 12 lb)
- Position: Right wing
- Shot: Left
- Played for: AHL; Saint John Flames; IHL; Cleveland Lumberjacks; Quebec Rafales; Europe; Revier Löwen Oberhausen; Heilbronner Falken; Sterzing; Straubing Tigers
- NHL draft: 278th overall, 1993; Calgary Flames
- Playing career: 1996–2002

Burke Murphy (born June 5, 1973) is a Canadian retired professional ice hockey player. He was selected by the Calgary Flames in the 11th round (278th overall) of the 1993 NHL entry draft.

Murphy played college hockey with St. Lawrence University, and in his final year of play with the St. Lawrence Saints men's ice hockey team (1995–96) Murphy was the recognized as the runner up for Hockey East's Player of the Year.

== Career statistics ==
| | | | Regular season | | | | | Playoffs |
| Season | Team | League | GP | G | A | Pts | PIM | GP | G | A | Pts | PIM |
|---|---|---|---|---|---|---|---|---|---|---|---|---|
| 1991–92 | Nepean Raiders | CJHL | 33 | 2 | 7 | 9 | 14 | — | — | — | — | — |
| 1992–93 | St. Lawrence University | NCAA | 32 | 19 | 10 | 29 | 32 | — | — | — | — | — |
| 1993–94 | St. Lawrence University | NCAA | 30 | 20 | 17 | 37 | 42 | — | — | — | — | — |
| 1994–95 | St. Lawrence University | NCAA | 33 | 27 | 23 | 50 | 61 | — | — | — | — | — |
| 1995–96 | St. Lawrence University | NCAA | 35 | 33 | 25 | 58 | 37 | — | — | — | — | — |
| 1996–97 | Saint John Flames | AHL | 54 | 8 | 18 | 26 | 20 | — | — | — | — | — |
| 1997–98 | Cleveland Lumberjacks | IHL | 11 | 3 | 2 | 5 | 2 | — | — | — | — | — |
| 1997–98 | Quebec Rafales | IHL | 13 | 10 | 6 | 16 | 4 | — | — | — | — | — |
| 1997–98 | Saint John Flames | AHL | 35 | 4 | 7 | 11 | 28 | — | — | — | — | — |
| 1998–99 | Revier Löwen Oberhausen | DEL | 52 | 22 | 15 | 37 | 30 | — | — | — | — | — |
| 1999–00 | Revier Löwen Oberhausen | DEL | 31 | 5 | 2 | 7 | 20 | — | — | — | — | — |
| 1999–00 | Heilbronner EC | Germany2 | 19 | 12 | 6 | 18 | 8 | — | — | — | — | — |
| 2000–01 | WSV Sterzing Broncos | Italy | 19 | 14 | 9 | 23 | 14 | — | — | — | — | — |
| 2001–02 | EHC Straubing | Germany2 | 53 | 35 | 28 | 63 | 89 | — | — | — | — | — |
| AHL totals | | | 89 | 12 | 25 | 37 | 48 | — | — | — | — | — |

== Awards and honours ==
| Award | Year |
|---|---|
| All-ECAC Hockey Rookie Team | 1992–93 |
| All-ECAC Hockey Second team | 1994–95 |
| All-ECAC Hockey First Team | 1995–96 |
| AHCA East Second-Team All-American | 1995–96 |

Awards and achievements
| Preceded by Christian Soucy | ECAC Hockey Rookie of the Year; 1992–93 | Succeeded by Éric Perrin |
