= Drew Bagnall =

Canadian ice hockey player (born 1983)

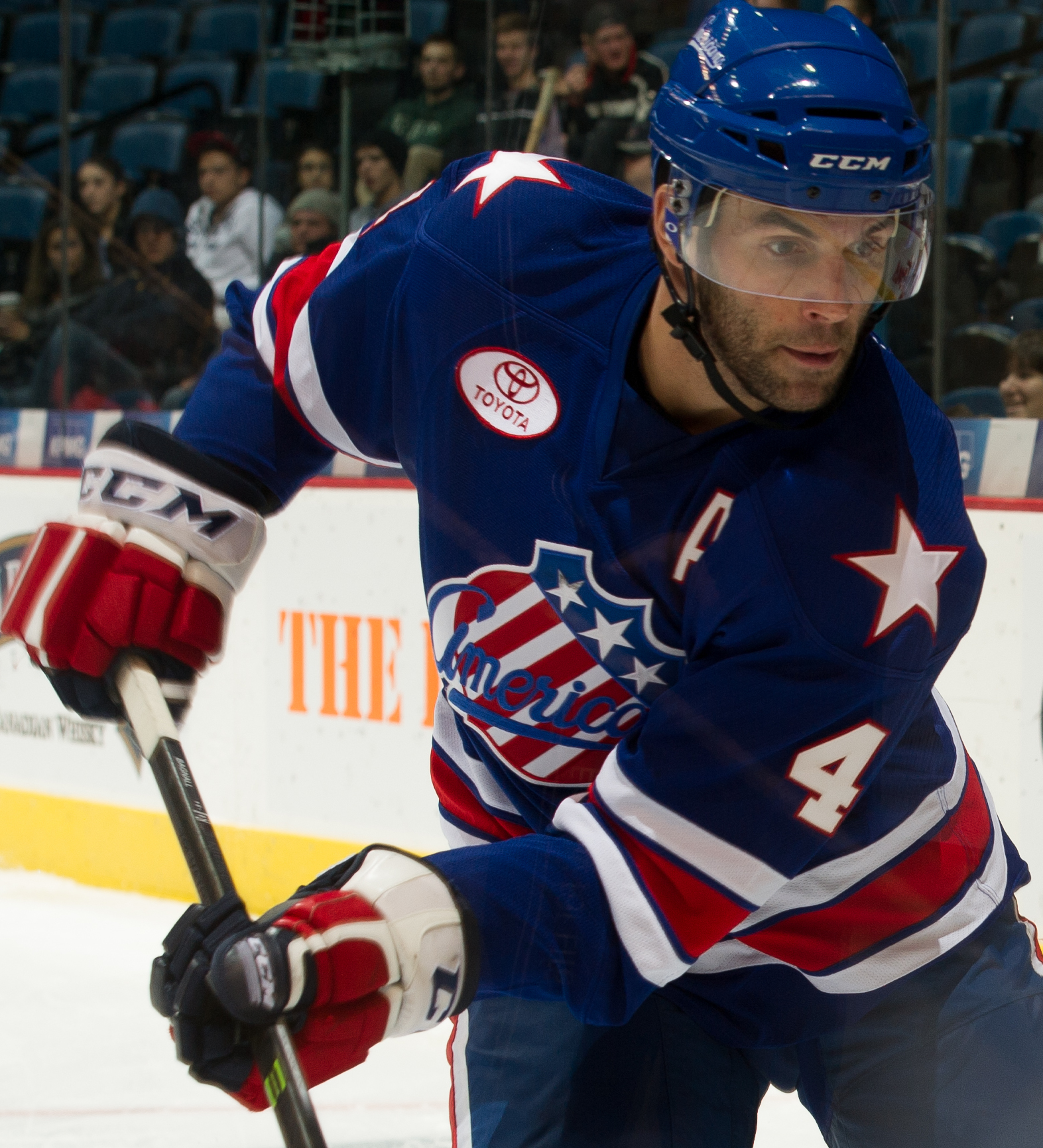
- Bagnall with the Rochester Americans in 2013
- Born: October 26, 1983 (age 42) Oakbank, Manitoba, Canada
- Height: 6 ft 2 in (188 cm)
- Weight: 220 lb (100 kg; 15 st 10 lb)
- Position: Defence
- Shot: Left
- Played for: Minnesota Wild
- NHL draft: 195th overall, 2003; Dallas Stars
- Playing career: 2007–2015

Drew Bagnall (born October 26, 1983) is a Canadian former professional ice hockey defenceman who played briefly with the Minnesota Wild in the National Hockey League (NHL).

== Playing career ==
Bagnall played four seasons for St. Lawrence University and five years in the minor leagues. In April 2011, at the age of 27, Bagnall made his NHL debut playing for the Minnesota Wild against the Edmonton Oilers. He primarily played as Captain with the Wild's AHL affiliate, the Houston Aeros.

On July 6, 2013, Bagnall left the Wild organization and signed a two-year, two way contract as a free agent with the Buffalo Sabres. Bagnall spent the entirety of his time in the Sabres organization with the Rochester Americans, serving as team Captain.

As a free agent, Bagnall announced his retirement from professional hockey on August 31, 2015.

== Career statistics ==
			Regular season					Playoffs
Season	Team	League	GP	G	A	Pts	PIM	GP	G	A	Pts	PIM
2000–01	Battlefords North Stars	SJHL	59	5	22	27	167	—	—	—	—	—
2001–02	Battlefords North Stars	SJHL	60	16	23	39	247	—	—	—	—	—
2002–03	Battlefords North Stars	SJHL	59	17	47	64	252	4	0	1	1	4
2003–04	St. Lawrence University	ECAC	40	5	13	18	61	—	—	—	—	—
2004–05	St. Lawrence University	ECAC	37	7	12	19	68	—	—	—	—	—
2005–06	St. Lawrence University	ECAC	24	1	9	10	32	—	—	—	—	—
2006–07	St. Lawrence University	ECAC	39	6	19	25	74	—	—	—	—	—
2007–08	Reading Royals	ECHL	10	1	2	3	32	—	—	—	—	—
2007–08	Manchester Monarchs	AHL	54	1	11	12	115	4	0	0	0	4
2008–09	Manchester Monarchs	AHL	79	0	6	6	150	—	—	—	—	—
2009–10	Manchester Monarchs	AHL	58	2	10	12	113	16	0	3	3	21
2010–11	Houston Aeros	AHL	72	0	2	2	112	24	1	1	2	22
2010–11	Minnesota Wild	NHL	2	0	0	0	4	—	—	—	—	—
2011–12	Houston Aeros	AHL	72	2	12	14	98	4	0	0	0	8
2012–13	Houston Aeros	AHL	47	1	5	6	88	5	0	0	0	6
2013–14	Rochester Americans	AHL	51	0	6	6	88	—	—	—	—	—
2014–15	Rochester Americans	AHL	41	3	9	12	62	—	—	—	—	—
2015–16	Bentley Generals	ChHL	5	0	0	0	14	—	—	—	—	—
AHL totals			474	9	61	70	826	53	1	4	5	61
NHL totals			2	0	0	0	4	—	—	—	—	—

== Awards and honors ==
Award	Year
College
All-ECAC Hockey First Team	2006–07
AHCA East First-Team All-American	2006–07
ECAC Hockey All-Tournament Team	2007

Awards and achievements
Preceded by T. J. Trevelyan	ECAC Hockey Player of the Year; 2006–07	Succeeded by Lee Jubinville
Preceded by Mike Madill	ECAC Hockey Best Defensive Defenseman; 2006–07	Succeeded by Mike Moore
