= Greg Carey (ice hockey) =

Canadian professional ice hockey player

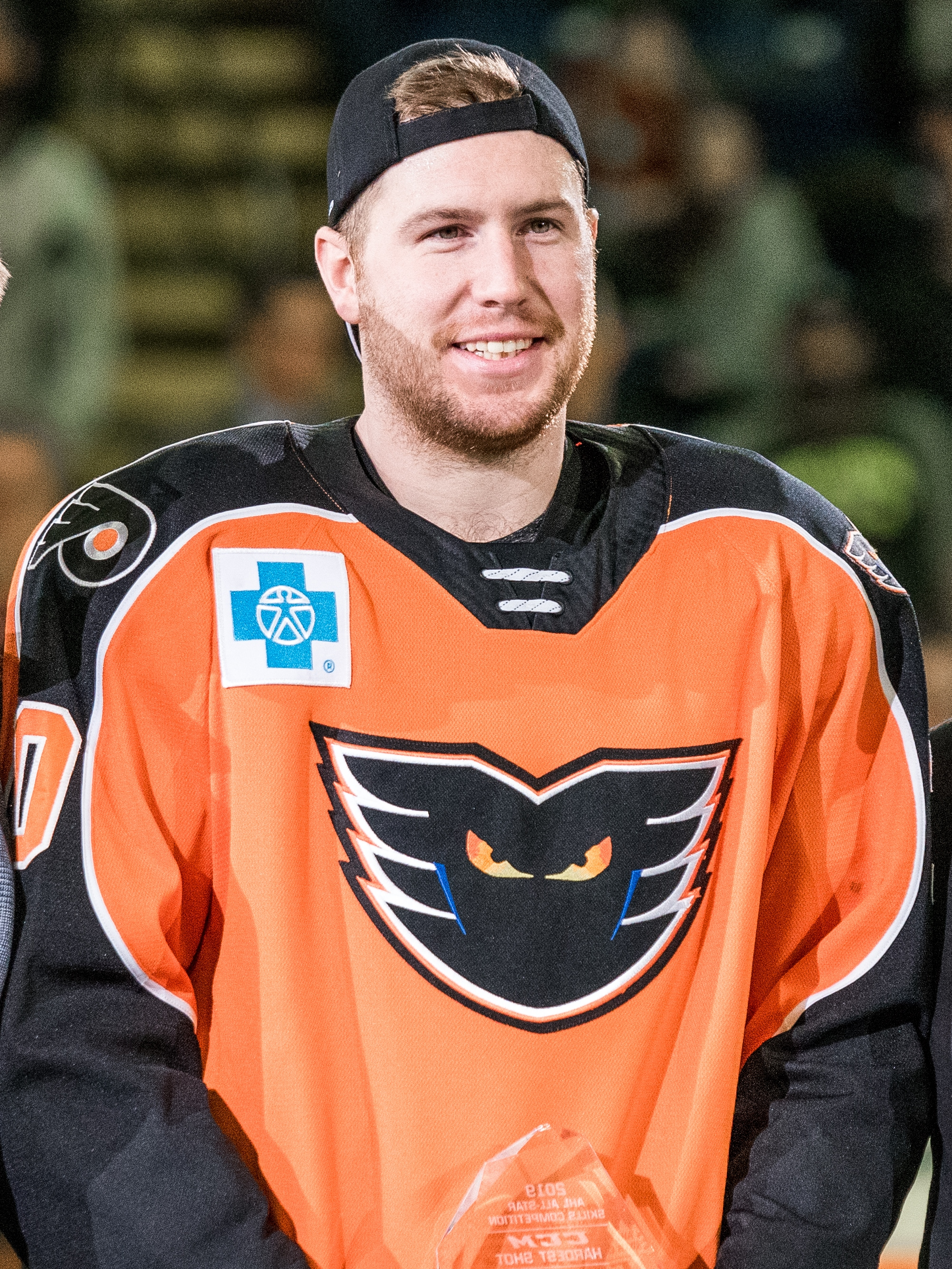
- Carey with the Lehigh Valley Phantoms in 2019
- Born: April 5, 1990 (age 36) Hamilton, Ontario, Canada
- Height: 5 ft 11 in (180 cm)
- Weight: 195 lb (88 kg; 13 st 13 lb)
- Position: Forward
- Shot: Left
- Played for: Portland Pirates; Springfield Falcons; Lehigh Valley Phantoms
- NHL draft: Undrafted
- Playing career: 2014–2022

Greg Carey (born April 5, 1990) is a Canadian former professional ice hockey player who played in the American Hockey League (AHL).

== Playing career ==
Carey began playing junior hockey with the Burlington Cougars of the OJHL. After returning from a four-game suspension in 2009, Carey recorded five points in an 8–2 win over the Milton Icehawks to help the Cougars set a new franchise record for most wins. He was also selected for Team Canada East and the CCHL All Star Team.

After graduating from St. Thomas More Secondary School and going undrafted in the NHL entry draft, Carey played college hockey with the St. Lawrence Saints in the NCAA Men's Division I ECAC Hockey conference.

In his freshman season, Carey became the first rookie to lead the Saints in scoring since 1982 and was named to the ECAC All Rookie Team. He was also named the Saints Rookie of the Year. In his sophomore year, Carey tied for the Saints scoring leader but had led the team in goals.

In his junior year, Carey's outstanding plays were rewarded with a selection to the 2012–13 ECAC Hockey All-Conference First Team.

At the conclusion of his senior year with the Saints, Carey was signed as a free agent by the Arizona Coyotes to a one-year entry-level deal on March 19, 2014. He then immediately joined the Coyotes' AHL affiliate, the Portland Pirates, on a try-out contract for the remainder of the 2013–14 season. In his first full professional season, he split the season between the Pirates the Coyotes ECHL affiliate, the Gwinnett Gladiators.

On the first day of 2016 Free Agency, the Philadelphia Flyers signed Carey to a two-year contract and reassigned him to their AHL affiliate, the Lehigh Valley Phantoms. He signed a contract extension with the Flyers on March 8, 2017.

In his third season with the Phantoms, Carey was selected for his first AHL All-Star Game alongside teammate Colin McDonald.

With his NHL contract concluded with the Flyers, Carey opted to return for a fourth season with the Lehigh Valley Phantoms, agreeing to a one-year AHL contract on July 1, 2019.

He was inactive during the 2020–21 season and signed with the HC Pustertal Wolfe for the 2021–22 season.

== Personal ==
Carey grew up in Hamilton, Ontario, to parents Debra and Alan Carey with younger brother Matt. Matt has also played for several professional hockey teams, including two games in the National Hockey League.

== Career statistics ==
			Regular season					Playoffs
Season	Team	League	GP	G	A	Pts	PIM	GP	G	A	Pts	PIM
2007–08	Burlington Cougars	OPJHL	46	10	12	22	16	—	—	—	—	—
2008–09	Burlington Cougars	OJHL	45	31	34	65	24	—	—	—	—	—
2009–10	Burlington Cougars	OJHL	48	72	42	114	46	10	7	4	11	13
2010–11	St. Lawrence University	ECAC	40	23	17	40	24	—	—	—	—	—
2011–12	St. Lawrence University	ECAC	36	15	22	37	22	—	—	—	—	—
2012–13	St. Lawrence University	ECAC	38	28	23	51	38	—	—	—	—	—
2013–14	St. Lawrence University	ECAC	38	18	39	57	39	—	—	—	—	—
2013–14	Portland Pirates	AHL	13	1	1	2	4	—	—	—	—	—
2014–15	Portland Pirates	AHL	29	2	4	6	18	—	—	—	—	—
2014–15	Gwinnett Gladiators	ECHL	30	15	12	27	6	—	—	—	—	—
2015–16	Springfield Falcons	AHL	64	26	17	43	20	—	—	—	—	—
2016–17	Lehigh Valley Phantoms	AHL	74	28	23	51	17	5	2	1	3	4
2017–18	Lehigh Valley Phantoms	AHL	72	31	22	53	32	13	3	4	7	12
2018–19	Lehigh Valley Phantoms	AHL	74	29	32	61	45	—	—	—	—	—
2019–20	Lehigh Valley Phantoms	AHL	57	15	15	30	22	—	—	—	—	—
2021–22	HC Pustertal Wolfe	IceHL	32	7	19	26	20	4	0	1	1	0
AHL totals			383	132	114	246	158	18	5	5	10	16

== Awards and honours ==
Award	Year
All-ECAC Hockey Rookie Team	2010–11
All-ECAC Hockey First Team	2012–13
AHCA East Second-Team All-American	2012–13
Hobey Baker Award Finalist	2012–13, 2013–14
All-ECAC Hockey First Team	2013–14
AHCA East First-Team All-American	2013–14

Awards and achievements
Preceded by Eric Hartzell	ECAC Hockey Player of the Year (co-winner with Shayne Gostisbehere); 2013–14	Succeeded by Jimmy Vesey
