= George Hughes (ice hockey) =

American ice hockey player

- Born: December 27, 1988 (age 36); Chicago, Illinois, USA
- Height: 6 ft 1 in (185 cm)
- Weight: 180 lb (82 kg; 12 st 12 lb)
- Position: Defence
- Shoots: Left
- team Former teams: Free Agent; San Antonio Rampage
- NHL draft: Undrafted
- Playing career: 2013–present

George Hughes (born December 27, 1988) is an American professional ice hockey defenceman. He is currently an unrestricted free agent who last played with the Bakersfield Condors of the ECHL.

Hughes played college hockey with the St. Lawrence Saints in the NCAA Men's Division I ECAC Hockey conference. In his senior year, Hughes's outstanding play was rewarded with a selection to the 2012-13 CCHA All-Conference First Team. He made his professional debut at the end of the 2012–13 season with the San Antonio Rampage of the American Hockey League.

On August 20, 2014, Hughes signed to return with the Bakersfield Condors, however failed to appear in a game for the 2014–15 season.

== Awards and honors ==
Award	Year
All-ECAC Hockey Rookie Team	2009–10
All-ECAC Hockey First Team	2012–13
AHCA East Second-Team All-American	2012–13
