= Erik Anderson (ice hockey) =

American ice hockey player

- Born: May 6, 1978 (age 48) Plymouth, Michigan, USA
- Height: 5 ft 10 in (178 cm)
- Weight: 192 lb (87 kg; 13 st 10 lb)
- Position: Center
- Shot: Left
- Played for: Milwaukee Admirals; Cincinnati Cyclones; Toledo Storm; Sheffield Steelers; Herlev Hornets; EHC Freiburg; Elmira Jackals
- Playing career: 1997–2007

Erik Anderson is an American former ice hockey center who was an All-American for St. Lawrence.

== Career ==
Anderson saw a great deal of success in his junior hockey career. His first year with the Stratford Cullitons saw him win both the league championship as well as the Sutherland Cup. The team repeated as MWJHL champions in 1996 and, while they were stopped just shy of a three-peat, Anderson personally had a superb final season. In 1997 he led the league in all three statistical categories, averaging more than 3 points per game for the year. He took his considerable scoring prowess to St. Lawrence but his freshman year was anything but spectacular. The decline was only temporary, however, and he more than doubled his point production as a sophomore, helping turn the Larries into one of the top teams in ECAC Hockey and getting them into the NCAA Tournament for the first time in seven years. Entering his junior season, Anderson was named an alternate captain and continued his scoring pace. This time, the team captured both conference championships and reached the Frozen Four for the first time in twelve years (the program's last appearance as of 2021). He was named team captain as a senior and, while the team declined a bit, Anderson had his best season yet, being named an All-American and ECAC Player of the Year.

After graduating, Anderson began playing professionally and started with the Milwaukee Admirals. He had some difficulty in adjusting to the AHL, averaging just over 1 point every 5 games, and found himself demoted to the ECHL before season's end. His second year began with him as a member of the Toledo Storm but he got off to a tremendous start. After six games, he had scored 10 points, was the team's leading scorer, and was recalled to the Milwaukee Admirals. While his scoring improved in year two, it still wasn't enough for the Admirals to keep him on the roster and he was eventually returned to Toledo.

Rather than continue in the minors, Anderson headed to England and joined the Sheffield Steelers. He finished second on the club in scoring and helped them win the inaugural EIHL championship, being named a second-team all-star for the year. After reaching the semifinals the next year, Anderson left the team and split the following year with two clubs in central Europe before returning across the pond and ending his playing career with the Elmira Jackals.

Anderson was inducted into the St. Lawrence Athletic Hall of Fame in 2019.

== Statistics ==
=== Regular season and playoffs ===
			Regular Season					Playoffs
Season	Team	League	GP	G	A	Pts	PIM	GP	G	A	Pts	PIM
1994–95	Stratford Cullitons	MWJHL	45	16	36	52	27	—	—	—	—	—
1995–96	Stratford Cullitons	MWJHL	38	29	43	72	10	—	—	—	—	—
1996–97	Stratford Cullitons	MWJHL	48	54	91	145	40	—	—	—	—	—
1997–98	St. Lawrence University	ECAC	33	5	13	18	12	—	—	—	—	—
1998–99	St. Lawrence University	ECAC	39	10	30	40	18	—	—	—	—	—
1999–00	St. Lawrence University	ECAC	36	14	25	39	22	—	—	—	—	—
2000–01	St. Lawrence University	ECAC	32	17	34	51	4	—	—	—	—	—
2001–02	Milwaukee Admirals	AHL	49	4	6	10	10	—	—	—	—	—
2001–02	Cincinnati Cyclones	ECHL	17	6	13	19	19	—	—	—	—	—
2002–03	Milwaukee Admirals	AHL	34	4	8	12	10	—	—	—	—	—
2002–03	Toledo Storm	ECHL	36	9	15	24	10	—	—	—	—	—
2003–04	Sheffield Steelers	EIHL	56	32	36	68	18	6	0	0	0	0
2004–05	Sheffield Steelers	EIHL	30	14	16	30	12	10	5	10	15	6
2005–06	Herlev Hornets	DEN	31	4	12	16	49	—	—	—	—	—
2005–06	EHC Freiburg	2.GBun	13	3	8	11	10	10	2	5	7	4
2006–07	Elmira Jackals	UHL	75	13	37	50	32	—	—	—	—	—
EIHL totals			86	46	52	98	30	16	5	10	15	6
AHL totals			83	8	14	22	20	—	—	—	—	—
ECHL totals			53	15	28	43	29	—	—	—	—	—

== Awards and honors ==
Award	Year
All-ECAC Hockey Second Team	1999–00
All-ECAC Hockey First Team	2000–01
AHCA East First-Team All-American	2000–01
EIHL Second-Team All-Star	2003–04

Awards and achievements
Preceded by Andy McDonald	ECAC Hockey Player of the Year; 2000–01	Succeeded by Marc Cavosie
