= Bernie McKinnon =

Canadian ice hockey, lacrosse, soccer and tennis coach

Biographical details
- Born: Dartmouth, Nova Scotia, Canada
- Died: October 22, 2000
- Education: St. Lawrence University

Playing career

Ice hockey
- 1954–1957: St. Lawrence
- Position: Forward

Coaching career (HC unless noted)

Ice hockey (men's)
- 1965–1971: St. Lawrence (Freshman)
- 1967–1968: St. Lawrence (Interim)
- 1971–1976: St. Lawrence

Ice hockey (women's)
- 1979–1996: St. Lawrence

Lacrosse (men's)

Soccer (women's)
- 1980–1995: St. Lawrence

Tennis (men's)

Tennis (women's)

Head coaching record
- Overall: 72–84–6 (M ice hockey); 160–159–14 (W ice hockey); 126–80–24 (W soccer)

Accomplishments and honors

Awards
- 1992 Coach of the Year (W Soccer); 1993 Coach of the Year (W Soccer); 1996 Joe Burke Award; 2000 St. Lawrence Athletic Hall of Fame

Bernard Anthony McKinnon was a Canadian ice hockey, lacrosse, soccer and tennis coach for St. Lawrence for over 30 years. He was the head coach both men's and women's teams for most sports as well as for freshman teams when varsity status was limited to three years.

== Career ==
Bernie McKinnon arrived at Canton in 1953, playing for the freshman ice hockey team before joining the elite varsity squad for the 1954–55 season. McKinnon helps the Saints to a 19-win season and their second NCAA tournament appearance. After a disappointing 4th-place finish McKinnon's Saints found themselves back in the tournament in 1956, narrowly losing in overtime to eventual champion Michigan before soundly defeating Boston College in the consolation game. In his senior season McKinnon was one of three team captains but the squad slumped just enough to be left out of the NCAA tournament. McKinnon returned to St. Lawrence in 1965 as a graduate assistant and was tasked with coaching the freshman ice hockey squad. He eventually added the responsibility of freshman lacrosse coach to his resume before taking over the varsity ice hockey team on an interim basis while head coach George Menard earned an MBA.

When Menard retired in 1971 McKinnon was the natural choice to replace him and while his results weren't poor, McKinnon could not arrest the slide of the men's team that had started in the late 60s. Over five seasons McKinnon could only get the program to post one winning season and resigned as the ice hockey coach in 1976 to focus on the other sports he was tasked with heading. That summer, his women's tennis team recorded an undefeated season, going 33–0. In 1978 coach-of-all-trades McKinnon accepted the head coaching duties of the women's ice hockey team which began sponsoring the varsity program the following year. In 1980 he took over the women's soccer team (promoted to varsity in 1982) and led both until his retirement in 1996. while his ice hockey squads only had moderate success, he was able to get the soccer team to two NCAA tournaments, amassing a record of 138–92–24 in the process.

After his retirement McKinnon received the Joe Burke Award for his contributions to women's ice hockey. and was inducted into the St. Lawrence Athletic Hall of Fame in the same year that he died from bone cancer.

== Career statistics ==
			Regular season					Playoffs
Season	Team	League	GP	G	A	Pts	PIM	GP	G	A	Pts	PIM
1954–55	St. Lawrence	NCAA	–	–	–	–	–	–	–	–	–	–
1955–56	St. Lawrence	NCAA	–	–	–	–	–	–	–	–	–	–
1956–57	St. Lawrence	NCAA	–	–	–	–	–	–	–	–	–	–
NCAA totals			68	16	28	44	–	–	–	–	–	–

== Head coaching record ==
=== Ice hockey ===
==== Men's ====
Record table
Season	Team	Overall	Conference	Standing	Postseason
St. Lawrence Saints (ECAC Hockey / ICAC) (1967–1968)
1967–68	St. Lawrence	14–8–1	11–5–1 / 2–2–0	3rd / 2nd	ECAC Quarterfinals
St. Lawrence:		14–8–1	11–5–1 / 2–2–0		
St. Lawrence Saints (ECAC Hockey / ICAC) (1971–1972)
1971–72	St. Lawrence	10–14–2	5–12–1 / 1–2–1	12th / 3rd	
St. Lawrence:		10–14–2	5–12–1 / 1–2–1		
St. Lawrence Saints (ECAC Hockey) (1972–1976)
1972–73	St. Lawrence	15–13–0	8–10–0	11th	
1973–74	St. Lawrence	12–15–1	9–7–1	5th	ECAC Quarterfinals
1974–75	St. Lawrence	10–17–1	7–14–1	13th	
1975–76	St. Lawrence	11–17–1	7–11–1	12th	
St. Lawrence:		48–62–3	31–42–3		
Total:		72–84–6			
National champion Postseason invitational champion Conference regular season champion Conference regular season and conference tournament champion Division regular season champion Division regular season and conference tournament champion Conference tournament champion

==== Women's ====
Record table
Season	Team	Overall	Conference	Standing	Postseason
St. Lawrence Saints (Independent) (1978–1984)
1979–80	St. Lawrence	12–4–0			
1980–81	St. Lawrence	8–10–1			
1981–82	St. Lawrence	12–5–1			
1982–83	St. Lawrence	12–7–1			
1983–84	St. Lawrence	14–5–0			
St. Lawrence:		58–31–3			
St. Lawrence Saints (ECAC Hockey) (1984–1996)
1984–85	St. Lawrence	12–7–0			
1985–86	St. Lawrence	9–10–1			
1986–87	St. Lawrence	14–9–0			ECAC First Round
1987–88	St. Lawrence	7–11–0			
1988–89	St. Lawrence	7–16–0	4–14–0	13th	
1989–90	St. Lawrence	5–13–1	5–11–1	10th	
1990–91	St. Lawrence	5–11–3			
1991–92	St. Lawrence	8–9–1			
1992–93	St. Lawrence	10–8–2	6–6–0	9th	ECAC Quarterfinals
1993–94	St. Lawrence	10–9–1	6–4–1	6th	ECAC Quarterfinals
1994–95	St. Lawrence	9–10–0	8–6–0	8th	ECAC Semifinals
1995–96	St. Lawrence	6–15–2	2–12–2	11th	
St. Lawrence:		102–128–11	31–53–4		
Total:		160–159–14			
National champion Postseason invitational champion Conference regular season champion Conference regular season and conference tournament champion Division regular season champion Division regular season and conference tournament champion Conference tournament champion

=== Women's Soccer ===
Record table
Season	Team	Overall	Conference	Standing	Postseason
St. Lawrence Saints (Independent) (1982–1995)
1982	St. Lawrence	7–6–1			
1983	St. Lawrence	4–6–1			
1984	St. Lawrence	7–4–2			
1985	St. Lawrence	11–3–0			
1986	St. Lawrence	12–4–0			NCAA tournament
1987	St. Lawrence	10–6–0			
1988	St. Lawrence	7–6–2			
1989	St. Lawrence	10–3–5			NCAA tournament
1990	St. Lawrence	11–6–3			
1991	St. Lawrence	9–9–3			
1992	St. Lawrence	12–7–0			
1993	St. Lawrence	12–5–1			
1994	St. Lawrence	9–7–2			
1995	St. Lawrence	5–8–4			
St. Lawrence:		126–80–24			
Total:		126–80–24			
National champion Postseason invitational champion Conference regular season champion Conference regular season and conference tournament champion Division regular season champion Division regular season and conference tournament champion Conference tournament champion
