= George Menard =

American ice hockey player and coach (1927–1990)

Biographical details
- Born: September 2, 1927; Burrillville, Rhode Island, U.S.
- Died: April 18, 1990 (aged 62); Deerfield, New Hampshire, U.S.

Playing career

Ice hockey
- 1947–1950: Brown
- Position: Defenseman

Coaching career (HC unless noted)

Ice hockey
- 1955–1967: St. Lawrence
- 1968–1971: St. Lawrence

Baseball
- 1967–1972: St. Lawrence

Head coaching record
- Overall: 204–137–14 (ice hockey); 46–25 (baseball)
- Tournaments: 2–8 (ice hockey)

Accomplishments and honors

Championships
- Ice hockey 1959 Tri-State League Champion; 1960 Tri-State League Champion; 1961 Tri-State League Champion; 1962 ECAC Hockey Tournament Champion

Awards
- 1976 Brown Athletic Hall of Fame; 1981 St. Lawrence Athletic Hall of Fame

George Francis Menard (September 2, 1927 – April 18, 1990) was an American ice hockey coach. He was the head coach of St. Lawrence during their renaissance after World War II taking them to five Frozen Fours during his tenure.

== Career ==
As many people did during the second world war George Menard enlisted in the armed services after graduating high school, but as he enlisted in October 1945 his services were unneeded for the war effort. The following fall he began attending Brown University, playing both ice hockey and baseball for the Bears to such an outstanding degree that he was signed by the New York Yankees.

George eschewed a professional playing career in favor of coaching, becoming the head coach at St. Lawrence in 1955 for both ice hockey and baseball. Menard continued the Saint's winning ways from the beginning, getting his team to a second straight NCAA tournament in his first season. In each of his first nine seasons behind the bench Menard would get St. Lawrence to finish with winning records as well as making five tournament appearances (four coming in consecutive seasons). When St. Lawrence became a founding member of ECAC Hockey in 1961–62 Menard led the Saints to the inaugural conference tournament title and followed it up with the school's first 20-win season, a feat they wouldn't repeat for 20 years.

Menard took off the 1967–68 season to earn an MBA from Syracuse University and though he returned to Canton the next year he couldn't recover the success he had had his first dozen years as coach. Menard resigned after the 1970–71 season, turning the program over to Bernie McKinnon who had served as a stand-in during his year off and then resigned as the baseball head coach after the following season. After his retirement Menard was inducted into the Brown Athletic Hall of Fame in 1976 and the St. Lawrence Athletic Hall of Fame in 1981.

== Death ==
George Menard died in Deerfield, New Hampshire on April 18, 1990, at the age of 62. He was survived by his wife, Frances, two sons and six daughters.

== Head coaching record ==
=== Ice hockey ===
Record table
Season	Team	Overall	Conference	Standing	Postseason
St. Lawrence Saints (Tri-State League) (1955–1961)
1955-56	St. Lawrence	18-5-0	4-2-0	2nd	NCAA Consolation Game (Win)
1956-57	St. Lawrence	13-7-0	3-3-0	3rd	
1957-58	St. Lawrence	10-8-2	1-4-0	4th	
1958-59	St. Lawrence	14-7-1	5-0-0	1st	NCAA Consolation Game (Loss)
1959-60	St. Lawrence	14-8-2	4-0-0	1st	NCAA Consolation Game (Loss)
1960-61	St. Lawrence	16-5-0	3-1-0	1st	NCAA Runner-Up
St. Lawrence:		85-40-5	20-10-0		
St. Lawrence Saints (ECAC Hockey) (1961–1967)
1961-62	St. Lawrence	17-9-1	9-5-1	10th	NCAA Consolation Game (Loss)
1962-63	St. Lawrence	20-6-1	12-3-1	4th	ECAC Third Place Game (Loss)
1963-64	St. Lawrence	13-10-2	8-7-1	14th	ECAC Runner-Up
1964-65	St. Lawrence	5-16-1	1-12-1	15th	
1965-66	St. Lawrence	15-8-1	8-6-1	5th	ECAC Quarterfinals
1966-67	St. Lawrence	17-8-1	9-5-1	4th	ECAC Third Place Game (Loss)
St. Lawrence:		87-57-7	47-38-6		
St. Lawrence Saints (ECAC Hockey) (1968–1971)
1968-69	St. Lawrence	11-11-2	8-8-2	9th	ECAC Quarterfinals
1969-70	St. Lawrence	11-15-0	8-9-0	9th	ECAC Quarterfinals
1970-71	St. Lawrence	10-14-0	5-12-0	12th	
St. Lawrence:		32-40-2	21-29-2		
Total:		204-137-14			
National champion Postseason invitational champion Conference regular season champion Conference regular season and conference tournament champion Division regular season champion Division regular season and conference tournament champion Conference tournament champion
