= Matt Carey =

Canadian ice hockey player (born 1992)

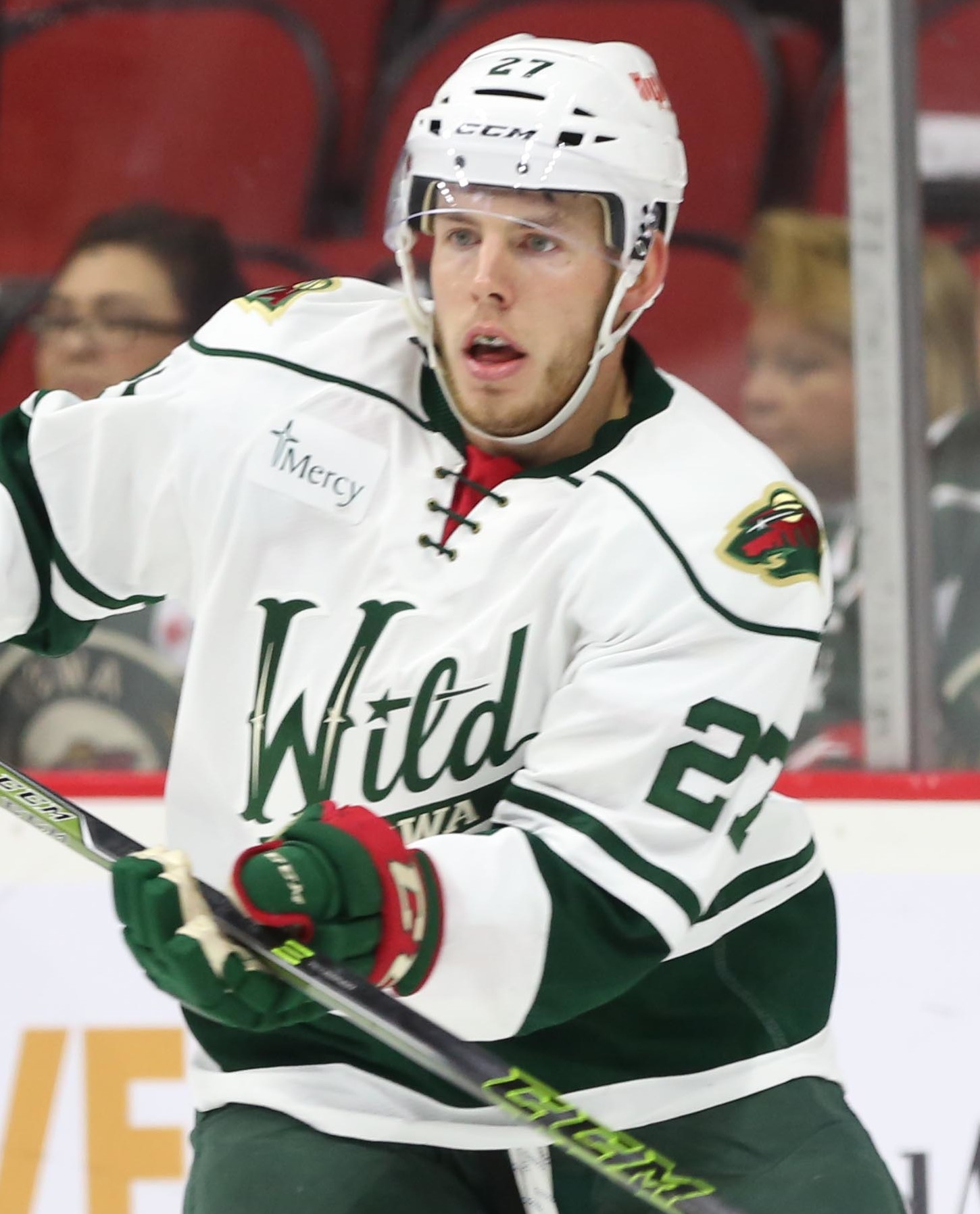
- Carey with the Iowa Wild
- Born: February 28, 1992 (age 34) Hamilton, Ontario, Canada
- Height: 6 ft 0 in (183 cm)
- Weight: 195 lb (88 kg; 13 st 13 lb)
- Position: Left wing
- Shoots: Left
- ECHL team Former teams: Norfolk Admirals; Chicago Blackhawks; Rögle BK; Schwenninger Wild Wings; Leksands IF; Düsseldorfer EG
- NHL draft: Undrafted
- Playing career: 2014–present

Matthew Carey (born February 28, 1992) is a Canadian professional ice hockey forward. He is currently on the Norfolk Admirals in the ECHL. He has previously played in the National Hockey League (NHL) with the Chicago Blackhawks.

== Playing career ==
Upon completion of his freshman season with St. Lawrence University in the ECAC, Carey signed as an undrafted free agent to a two-year entry-level contract with the Chicago Blackhawks on March 20, 2014.

On March 28, 2014, Carey made his NHL debut with the Blackhawks in the 2013–14 season, in a 5–3 loss to the Ottawa Senators. In his debut game, Carey registered 2 penalty minutes, and ended the night with a minus-1 rating. Carey scored his first NHL goal on April 12, 2014, against Pekka Rinne of the Nashville Predators.

At the completion of his entry-level contract with the Blackhawks, Carey was not retained with a qualifying offer with the Blackhawks. On July 13, 2015, Carey signed as a free agent to a one-year AHL contract with the Iowa Wild, an affiliate of the Minnesota Wild.

As a free agent from the Wild in the following off-season, Carey secured another AHL, agreeing to a one-year deal with the Hartford Wolf Pack on September 7, 2016. In the 2016–17 season, despite being unable to propel the Wolf Pack to the post-season, Carey compiled his best season offensively in the AHL, registering 21 goals and 29 points in 73 games.

In the following summer, Carey agreed to attend the Hershey Bears 2017 training camp on a professional try-out basis. Upon his release from the Bears, Carey opted to begin the 2017–18 season with the defending Calder Cup champions, the Grand Rapids Griffins, in signing a PTO on October 5, 2017. Carey contributed with a goal and assist in 8 games with the Griffins before opting for a release from his try-out in order to accept a contract for the remainder of the season with Swedish outfit Leksands IF of the Swedish HockeyAllsvenskan on November 8, 2017.

In May 2018, Carey continued in the Allsvenskan signing with Karlskrona HK. Having eclipsed his previous season totals, contributing with 21 points in 32 games with Karlskrona, Carey was signed to a SHL contract Rögle BK midway through the 2018–19 season. Carey added 2 goals and 5 points in 20 games before leaving Rögle BK at the conclusion of his contract with club at seasons end.

On March 27, 2019, Carey agreed to a one-year contract with the Schwenninger Wild Wings in Germany's top league, the Deutsche Eishockey Liga (DEL). He posted 23 points through 39 games before leaving to return to the SHL, signing up with Leksands IF for the remainder of the season on February 13, 2020. In November 2020, Carey returned to Germany signing with the Düsseldorfer EG until the end of the season. He was then signed by Löwen Frankfurt of the DEL2 in July 2021.

On December 26, 2021, he was returned to North America after being signed by the Norfolk Admirals in the ECHL.

== Personal ==
Carey grew up in Hamilton, Ontario, to parents Debra and Alan Carey with older brother Greg Carey. Greg is also a professional ice hockey player.

== Career statistics ==
			Regular season					Playoffs
Season	Team	League	GP	G	A	Pts	PIM	GP	G	A	Pts	PIM
2009–10	Burlington Cougars	OJHL	5	0	0	0	0	—	—	—	—	—
2009–10	Hamilton Red Wings	OJHL	20	7	6	13	20	10	1	2	3	20
2010–11	Hamilton Red Wings	OJHL	45	25	59	84	40	7	3	2	5	10
2011–12	Hamilton Red Wings	OJHL	23	17	21	38	8	—	—	—	—	—
2011–12	Toronto Jr. Canadiens	OJHL	25	16	15	31	24	10	9	5	14	18
2013–14	St. Lawrence University	ECAC	38	18	19	37	47	—	—	—	—	—
2013–14	Chicago Blackhawks	NHL	2	1	0	1	2	—	—	—	—	—
2014–15	Rockford IceHogs	AHL	67	10	11	21	43	2	0	0	0	0
2015–16	Iowa Wild	AHL	21	2	2	4	14	—	—	—	—	—
2015–16	Quad City Mallards	ECHL	49	25	22	47	46	3	2	2	4	2
2016–17	Hartford Wolf Pack	AHL	73	21	8	29	82	—	—	—	—	—
2017–18	Grand Rapids Griffins	AHL	8	1	1	2	9	—	—	—	—	—
2017–18	Leksands IF	Allsv	30	4	8	12	26	—	—	—	—	—
2018–19	Karlskrona HK	Allsv	32	6	15	21	57	—	—	—	—	—
2018–19	Rögle BK	SHL	20	2	3	5	27	—	—	—	—	—
2019–20	Schwenninger Wild Wings	DEL	39	6	17	23	12	—	—	—	—	—
2019–20	Leksands IF	SHL	7	2	2	4	6	—	—	—	—	—
2020–21	Düsseldorfer EG	DEL	37	8	12	20	18	—	—	—	—	—
2021–22	Löwen Frankfurt	DEL2	19	4	9	13	21	—	—	—	—	—
NHL totals			2	1	0	1	2	—	—	—	—	—
SHL totals			27	4	5	9	33	—	—	—	—	—

== Awards and honours ==
Award	Year	Ref
All-ECAC Rookie Team	2013–14	
