= Joe Day (ice hockey) =

American ice hockey player (born 1968)

- Born: May 11, 1968 (age 58) Blue Island, Illinois, U.S.
- Height: 5 ft 11 in (180 cm)
- Weight: 181 lb (82 kg; 12 st 13 lb)
- Position: Center
- Shot: Left
- Played for: Hartford Whalers; New York Islanders; Springfield Indians; Salt Lake Golden Eagles; Detroit Vipers; Las Vegas Thunder; Baltimore Bandits; Pensacola Ice Pilots
- National team: United States
- NHL draft: 186th overall, 1987; Hartford Whalers
- Playing career: 1990–2001

Joseph Christopher Day (born May 11, 1968) is an American retired ice hockey center, most notably for the Springfield Indians of the American Hockey League and the Las Vegas Thunder of the International Hockey League. He played in the National Hockey League for the Hartford Whalers and New York Islanders. He also represented the United States at the 1988 World Junior Ice Hockey Championships.

== Career statistics ==
			Regular season					Playoffs
Season	Team	League	GP	G	A	Pts	PIM	GP	G	A	Pts	PIM
1986–87	St. Lawrence University	NCAA	33	9	11	20	25	—	—	—	—	—
1987–88	St. Lawrence University	NCAA	30	23	16	39	36	—	—	—	—	—
1988–89	St. Lawrence University	NCAA	36	21	27	48	44	—	—	—	—	—
1989–90	St. Lawrence University	NCAA	32	19	26	45	30	—	—	—	—	—
1990–91	Springfield Indians	AHL	75	24	29	53	82	18	5	5	10	27
1991–92	Hartford Whalers	NHL	24	0	3	3	10	—	—	—	—	—
1991–92	Springfield Indians	AHL	50	33	25	58	92	—	—	—	—	—
1992–93	Hartford Whalers	NHL	24	1	7	8	47	—	—	—	—	—
1992–93	Springfield Indians	AHL	33	15	20	35	118	15	0	8	8	40
1993–94	New York Islanders	NHL	24	0	0	0	30	—	—	—	—	—
1993–94	Salt Lake Golden Eagles	IHL	33	16	10	26	153	—	—	—	—	—
1994–95	Detroit Vipers	IHL	32	16	10	26	126	5	0	2	2	21
1995–96	Detroit Vipers	IHL	53	19	19	38	105	—	—	—	—	—
1995–96	Las Vegas Thunder	IHL	29	11	17	28	70	15	7	3	10	46
1996–97	Baltimore Bandits	AHL	11	3	0	3	22	—	—	—	—	—
1996–97	Las Vegas Thunder	IHL	30	9	14	23	41	3	0	0	0	6
1997–98	Las Vegas Thunder	IHL	82	30	25	55	183	4	0	3	3	14
2000–01	Pensacola Ice Pilots	ECHL	6	0	1	1	4	—	—	—	—	—
NHL totals			72	1	10	11	87	—	—	—	—	—
AHL totals			169	75	74	149	314	33	5	13	18	67
IHL totals			259	101	95	196	678	27	7	8	15	87

== Awards and honors ==
Award	Year
All-ECAC Hockey Second Team	1989–90
