= Paul Patten (ice hockey) =

American football and ice hockey player and coach (1920–1992)

Biographical details
- Born: November 14, 1920; Chillicothe, Ohio, U.S.
- Died: January 24, 1992 (aged 71); Sarasota, Florida, U.S.

Playing career

Football
- 1940–1941: Notre Dame
- Position: Quarterback

Coaching career (HC unless noted)

Football
- 1948–1955: St. Lawrence

Ice hockey
- 1947–1950: St. Lawrence
- 1957–1963: Cornell

Head coaching record
- Overall: 32–26–2 (football); 58–73–3 (ice hockey)

Paul Edward Patten (1920–1992) was an American ice hockey coach who helped revive the program at Cornell. The ex-Notre Dame quarterback returned to his hometown as a coach in 1947, taking over for both the football and ice hockey teams at St. Lawrence. While he stepped away from the hockey program after 1950 in favor of Olav Kollevoll he continued on with the football squad until 1955 when he left to accept the responsibility of leading the Cornell hockey team after its nearly decade-long abandonment.

The Big Red officially restarted in 1957 after the opening of the Lynah Rink, the school's first indoor facility, and as might be expected the team struggled through the first few years, going 16–54–2 in his first four years before Patten led them to a winning season in 1961–62, Cornell's first as a member of ECAC Hockey. Patten spent one more season behind the bench before resigning and turning over the program to Ned Harkness.

== Head coaching record ==
=== Ice hockey ===
Record table
Season	Team	Overall	Conference	Standing	Postseason
St. Lawrence Saints Independent (1947–1950)
1947–48	St. Lawrence	6–3			
1948–49	St. Lawrence	5–2			
1949–50	St. Lawrence	9–0			
St. Lawrence:		20–5			
Cornell Big Red Independent (1957–1961)
1957–58	Cornell	3–7–1			
1958–59	Cornell	4–16–1			
1959–60	Cornell	2–19			
1960–61	Cornell	7–12			
Cornell:		16–54–2			
Cornell Big Red (ECAC Hockey) (1961–1963)
1961–62	Cornell	13–5	11–5	8th	
1962–63	Cornell	9–9–1	8–9	14th	
Cornell:		22–14–1	19–14		
Total:		58–73–3			
