= 1956–57 Colorado College Tigers men's ice hockey season =

National Champion WIHL champion 1957 NCAA Tournament, champion
- Conference: 1st WIHL
- Home ice: Broadmoor World Arena

Record
- Overall: 25–5–0
- Home: 19–1
- Road: 4–4
- Neutral: 2–0

Coaches and captains
- Head coach: Tom Bedecki
- Captain: Don Wishart

The 1956–57 Colorado College Tigers men's ice hockey team represented Colorado College in college ice hockey. In its 2nd year under head coach Tom Bedecki, the team compiled a 25–5–0 record, outscored opponents 205 to 106, and won the 1957 NCAA Men's Ice Hockey Tournament. The Tigers defeated Michigan 13–6 in the championship game at the Broadmoor World Arena in Colorado Springs, Colorado. CC tied the record for the most goals scored in a championship game (1950) and combined with the Wolverines for the most total goals in a title game (19). As of 2018 this is the last time Colorado College has won the national title in ice hockey.

== Season ==
After appearing in the first five national tournaments Colorado College had made the championship once in the next four years. CC's fortunes turned the year before when Bill Hay, a standout junior player from Saskatchewan hitchhiked down to Colorado Springs and was able to talk both himself and his fried Bob McCusker into athletic scholarships. Both players made their varsity debut in 1956–57, as did much of the team, and the Tigers quickly jumped to the top of the standings. After opening the regular season against two junior teams from Canada, CC welcomed four different collegiate opponents into their building and won every single game.

With the Tigers sporting a 12-0 record they hit the road for the first time but didn't have to leave the state when they travelled to Denver to face the Pioneers. Colorado College's perfect record was spoiled with a 3–6 defeat but the returned the favor the next night at home, beating their in-state rival 8–7 in overtime. The Tigers hosted another pair of Canadian junior teams before heading north to face an improving Fighting Sioux team and lost both matches. Two days later CC finally won its first road game of the season, beating Minnesota twice before returning to Colorado to take the second home-and-home series against Denver. After redeeming themselves against North Dakota in two home wins the Tigers split a road series with Michigan Tech to close out their season.

Despite CC's struggles on the road the team was able to win the WIHL title handily and, with a superb 19–1 home record, post the best season in team history (As of 2018). Colorado College was led back to the NCAA tournament by Hay and McCusker who finished first (tied) and third in scoring in the nation. Both players earned their way onto one of the two All-American Teams as did team captain Don Wishart and all three players were first-team All-WIHL.

Befitting the western champion, Colorado College was selected as the #1 seed in the west and opened the tournament against Clarkson who had compiled an undefeated season the year before and followed that up with a stellar 18–2 mark. Despite the two teams' success the Golden Knights were completely outmatched by older and larger CC team. While the final score was relatively close, 5–3 with a hat-trick from Bob McCusker, the Tigers nearly tripled the number of shots from Clarkson (60–21) and the Green and Gold couldn't score enough to reward the valiant effort from the goaltender Eddie MacDonald.

In the title tilt CC found itself pitted against two-time defending champion Michigan who had won five of the six national titles since CC earned its first championship in 1950. The Wolverines had utterly dominated the series between the two teams over the previous decade and won all three games the pair played in the NCAA Tournament despite every game being played at the Broadmoor World Arena. None of those losses, however, had come with Hay and McCusker on the team and the two sophomores combined to score the first three goals of the contest. Showing the championship mettle, Michigan responded with three of their own before the first period was over and erased the CC advantage. CC goalie Bob Southwood settled down in the second period and when the Tigers scored three more times the Wolverines could only muster one in response. Even with a two-goal lead the Tigers didn't pull back in the third and after McCusker opened the scoring with his third of the game the rest of the team followed suit and score five more times before Michigan got its fifth but by then it was far too late and the Tigers eventually cruised to a 13–6 victory, winning their second National Title.

Bob McCusker tied the NCAA records for goals (4) and points (6) in a championship game and was the logical choice for Most Outstanding Player. McCusker was accompanied by Bill Hay and Don Wishart on the All-Tournament First Team while Dick McGhee and John Andrews made the Second Team.

== Standings ==
1956–57 Western Intercollegiate Hockey League
	Conference								Overall					
	GP	W	L	T	PCT	PTS	GF	GA	GP	W	L	T	GF	GA
Colorado College†	18	14	4	0	.778	19	93	69	30	25	5	0	205	105
Michigan	18	13	4	1	.750	16½	76	55	25	18	5	2	112	79
North Dakota	22	13	9	0	.591	13	82	72	29	18	11	0	126	99
Michigan Tech	20	8	8	4	.500	12½	80	76	28	14	9	5	133	97
Denver	18	6	11	1	.361	9	64	74	28	12	14	2	121	105
Minnesota	24	7	15	2	.333	8	69	92	29	12	15	2	96	96
Michigan State	20	5	15	0	.250	6	42	68	22	7	15	0	62	71
† indicates conference regular season champion Note: All games played between league members counted in the standings. When teams played each other twice, two points were awarded for a win, one point for a tie. When teams met each other four times, one point was awarded for a win, one-half point for a tie. Maximum 24 points available.

== Schedule ==
Conference games against Michigan State, Michigan Tech and Minnesota were only worth 1 point in the standings.

Date	Opponent	Site	Result	Record
Exhibition
November 30	vs. Colorado College Alumni*	Broadmoor World Arena • Colorado Springs, Colorado	W 2–1	
December 1	vs. Colorado College Alumni*	Broadmoor World Arena • Colorado Springs, Colorado	W 9–5	
Regular season
December 6	vs. Humboldt Indians*	Broadmoor World Arena • Colorado Springs, Colorado	W 8–4	1–0–0
December 8	vs. Humboldt Indians*	Broadmoor World Arena • Colorado Springs, Colorado	W 12–3	2–0–0
December 13	vs. St. Boniface Canadiens*	Broadmoor World Arena • Colorado Springs, Colorado	W 12–2	3–0–0
December 15	vs. St. Boniface Canadiens*	Broadmoor World Arena • Colorado Springs, Colorado	W 15–5	4–0–0
December 18	vs. Michigan	Broadmoor World Arena • Colorado Springs, Colorado	W 5–4	5–0–0 (1–0–0)
December 19	vs. Michigan	Broadmoor World Arena • Colorado Springs, Colorado	W 7–5	6–0–0 (2–0–0)
December 21	vs. Michigan State	Broadmoor World Arena • Colorado Springs, Colorado	W 8–2	7–0–0 (3–0–0)
December 22	vs. Michigan State	Broadmoor World Arena • Colorado Springs, Colorado	W 7–1	8–0–0 (4–0–0)
January 1	vs. Yale*	Broadmoor World Arena • Colorado Springs, Colorado	W 10–0	9–0–0 (4–0–0)
January 2	vs. Yale*	Broadmoor World Arena • Colorado Springs, Colorado	W 17–3	10–0–0 (4–0–0)
January 4	vs. Minnesota	Broadmoor World Arena • Colorado Springs, Colorado	W 4–1	11–0–0 (5–0–0)
January 5	vs. Minnesota	Broadmoor World Arena • Colorado Springs, Colorado	W 5–3	12–0–0 (6–0–0)
January 11	at Denver	DU Arena • Denver, Colorado	L 3–6	12–1–0 (6–1–0)
January 12	vs. Denver	Broadmoor World Arena • Colorado Springs, Colorado	W 8–7 ^{OT}	13–1–0 (7–1–0)
January 26	vs. Regina Pats*	Broadmoor World Arena • Colorado Springs, Colorado	W 5–3	14–1–0 (7–1–0)
January 28	vs. Regina Pats*	Broadmoor World Arena • Colorado Springs, Colorado	W 8–1	15–1–0 (7–1–0)
February 2	vs. Flin Flon Bombers*	Broadmoor World Arena • Colorado Springs, Colorado	L 3–5	15–2–0 (7–1–0)
February 4	vs. Flin Flon Bombers*	Broadmoor World Arena • Colorado Springs, Colorado	W 4–2	16–2–0 (7–1–0)
February 8	at North Dakota	Winter Sports Building • Grand Forks, North Dakota	L 3–6	16–3–0 (7–2–0)
February 9	at North Dakota	Winter Sports Building • Grand Forks, North Dakota	L 4–5	16–4–0 (7–3–0)
February 11	at Minnesota	St. Paul Auditorium • Saint Paul, Minnesota	W 3–2 ^{OT}	17–4–0 (8–3–0)
February 12	at Minnesota	Williams Arena • Minneapolis, Minnesota	W 5–2	18–4–0 (9–3–0)
February 15	at Denver	DU Arena • Denver, Colorado	W 6–4	19–4–0 (10–3–0)
February 16	vs. Denver	Broadmoor World Arena • Colorado Springs, Colorado	W 4–3	20–4–0 (11–3–0)
February 19	vs. North Dakota	Broadmoor World Arena • Colorado Springs, Colorado	W 6–4	21–4–0 (12–3–0)
February 20	vs. North Dakota	Broadmoor World Arena • Colorado Springs, Colorado	W 7–6 ^{OT}	22–4–0 (13–3–0)
March 2	at Michigan Tech	Dee Stadium • Houghton, Michigan	L 3–4	22–5–0 (13–4–0)
March 3	at Michigan Tech	Dee Stadium • Houghton, Michigan	W 5–4	23–5–0 (14–4–0)
NCAA Tournament
March 14	vs. Clarkson*	Broadmoor World Arena • Colorado Springs, Colorado (National Semifinal)	W 5–3	24–5–0 (14–4–0)
March 16	vs. Michigan*	Broadmoor World Arena • Colorado Springs, Colorado (National Championship)	W 13–6	25–5–0 (14–4–0)
*Non-conference game. Source:

== Roster and scoring statistics ==
No.	Name	Year	Position	Hometown	S/P/C	Games	Goals	Assists	Pts	PIM
	Bill Hay	Sophomore	C	Saskatoon, SK	(Saskatchewan)	30	28	45	73	–
	Bob McCusker	Sophomore	F	Saskatoon, SK	(Saskatchewan)	–	47	24	71	–
	Ike Scott	Sophomore	RW	Gravenhurst, ON	(Ontario)	–	25	21	46	–
	Harry Harasyn	Sophomore	C	Yorkton, SK	(Saskatchewan)	–	21	17	38	–
	Don Wishart	Senior	D/F	Rosetown, SK	(Saskatchewan)	–	10	27	37	–
	John Andrews	Sophomore	LW	Fort William, ON	(Ontario)	–	6	29	35	–
	Bud Hubchik	Senior	F	Grandview, MB	(Manitoba)	–	21	9	30	–
	George deRappard	Senior	LW	Westlock, AB	(Alberta)	–	12	14	26	–
	Harley Patterson	Sophomore	LW	Hythe, AB	(Alberta)	–	16	6	22	–
	Ron Laughlin	Sophomore	C	Drumheller, AB	(Alberta)	–	6	16	22	–
	Murray Dea	Sophomore	RW	Edmonton, AB	(Alberta)	–	6	12	18	–
	Gary Hughes	Senior	D	Red Deer, AB	(Alberta)	–	5	13	18	–
	Gerry Capello	Sophomore	D/C	Ottawa, ON	(Ontario)	–	4	13	17	–
	Ron Villeneuve	Sophomore	D	Cornwall, ON	(Ontario)	–	2	7	9	–
	Dick McGhee	Sophomore	D	Calgary, AB	(Alberta)	–	2	7	9	–
	Bob Tanner	Sophomore	RW	Trail, BC	(British Columbia)	–	1	4	5	–
	Ernest Rotondo	Sophomore	D	South Porcupine, ON	(Ontario)	–	–	–	–	–
Total							212	264	476	

- Colorado College players are reported to have collectively scored 212 goals over the course of the season but the team only scored 205 times during the season.

== Goaltending statistics ==
No.	Name	Games	Minutes	Wins	Losses	Ties	Goals against	Saves	Shut outs	SV %	GAA
	Bob Southwood	17	–	–	–	–	–	–	–	–	–
	Howard Viger	14	–	–	–	–	–	–	–	–	–
Total		30	–	–	–	–	–	–	–	–	–

== 1957 championship game ==
=== (W1) Colorado College vs. (W2) Michigan ===
March 16	Colorado College	13 – 6	Michigan	Broadmoor Ice Palace

Scoring summary
Period	Team	Goal	Assist(s)	Time	Score
1st	CC	Bob McCusker	Scott and McGhee	3:15	1–0 CC
1st	CC	Bill Hay	McCusker	8:04	2–0 CC
1st	CC	Bob McCusker	Hay and Capello	11:39	3–0 CC
1st	UM	Dick Dunnigan	unassisted	13:14	3–1 CC
1st	UM	Neil McDonald	unassisted	17:30	3–2 CC
1st	UM	John Hutton	McDonald	17:57	3–3
2nd	CC	Murray Dea	Laughlin	24:52	4–3 CC
2nd	CC	John Andrews	Hubchik	26:18	5–3 CC
2nd	UM	Ed Switzer	Dunnigan	30:18	5–4 CC
2nd	CC	Bill Hay	McCusker and McGhee	34:05	6–4 CC
3rd	CC	Bob McCusker – GW	Dea	41:23	7–4 CC
3rd	CC	Harley Patterson	Harasyn	46:20	8–4 CC
3rd	CC	Don Hersack	Hubchik and Andrews	49:10	9–4 CC
3rd	CC	Harry Harasyn	Patterson	52:59	10–4 CC
3rd	CC	Bob McCusker	Hay	53:47	11–4 CC
3rd	CC	Don Hersack	Hubchik	54:53	12–4 CC
3rd	UM	Tom Rendall	Starr	55:15	12–5 CC
3rd	CC	Don Wishart	deRappard	56:11	13–5 CC
3rd	UM	Neil McDonald	Switzer	56:36	13–6 CC
Penalty summary
Period	Team	Player	Penalty	Time	PIM
1st	CC	Bob Southwood			2:00
1st	CC	Bunt Hubchik			2:00
2nd	UM	Bob Schiller			2:00
2nd	UM	Bob Schiller			2:00
2nd	CC	Gary Hughes			2:00
3rd	UM	Dick Dunnigan			2:00
3rd	UM	Tom Rendall			2:00
3rd	CC	Bob McCusker			2:00
3rd	CC	Gerry Capello			2:00

Shots by period
Team	1	2	3	T
Michigan	9	7	11	27
Colorado College	10	14	17	41

Goaltenders
Team	Name	Saves	Goals against	Time on ice
UM	Ross Childs	28	13	
CC	Bob Southwood	21	6	

== See also ==
- 1957 NCAA Division I Men's Ice Hockey Tournament
- List of NCAA Division I Men's Ice Hockey Tournament champions
