= British American Oil Company =

Canadian petroleum company (1906–1969)

British American Oil Company Limited
- Industry: Petroleum
- Founded: 17 October 1906; 119 years ago
- Founder: Albert Leroy Ellsworth
- Defunct: 1 April 1969
- Fate: Became Gulf Oil Canada
- Headquarters: British American Building; 800 Bay Street; Toronto, Ontario, Canada

British American Oil Company Limited was a Canadian integrated petroleum company that operated between 1906 and 1969. British American was founded in Toronto in 1906 by Albert Leroy Ellsworth (1876–1950). By the 1950s, the Gulf Oil Corporation of Pittsburgh had become British American's controlling shareholder. In 1956 Gulf merged its Canadian subsidiary, the Canadian Gulf Oil Company, with British American using the latter's name. In 1969 British American amalgamed with its subsidiaries into a new company called Gulf Oil Canada Limited. After several name changes ending at Gulf Canada Resources Limited, the company was acquired in 2001 by Conoco, becoming Conoco Canada Resources Limited (now ConocoPhillips Resources Canada).

== History ==
=== Early years ===
The British American Oil Company was founded in Toronto, Ontario, in 1906 by Albert Leroy Ellsworth (1876–1950). He was born in Welland, Ontario, and had worked for 9 years at Standard Oil's Acme Refinery in Buffalo, New York. The company was organized with a Province of Ontario Charter dated October 17, 1906, and its first office building was located at the corner of King and Yonge Streets in Toronto.

In 1908, with 8 shareholders, B/A built Canada's third refinery on 3 acres on the eastern waterfront in Toronto. The company refined imported crude oil and its main product was kerosene; a then-useless by-product was gasoline, which was dumped into a swamp. B/A acquired a Dominion Charter which allowed it to expand eastward into Quebec as well as west into other provinces. Expansion was swift, with the refinery expanding to 40 acres and crude oil production was up to 32,000 barrels per month. Most of the product was hauled on horse-drawn wagons and in wooden barrels by rail.

In 1920, B/A purchased the Winnipeg Oil Company and established regional headquarters in Winnipeg, Manitoba. The company was by then marketing a variety of products, including gasoline, motor oil, benzene, anti-freeze, and others under a variety of brands, both in-house and from other companies. In 1924 B/A entered the U.S. as a producing company with the formation of the Toronto Pipeline Company. In 1925 B/A formed the British-American Oil Producing Company in Delaware to develop producing oil fields which were then being discovered in Oklahoma. It was a wholly owned subsidiary of B/A with operations confined to the United States.

In 1922, Ellsworth, together with several partners, established the Clear Vision Pump Company Limited (CVPC), which amongst other products was the first pump that provided a visual check of the gasoline being dispensed. CVPC acquired similar companies in Canada and the United States which led to the formation of the Service Station Equipment Company Limited in 1927, later renamed International Metal Industries Limited.

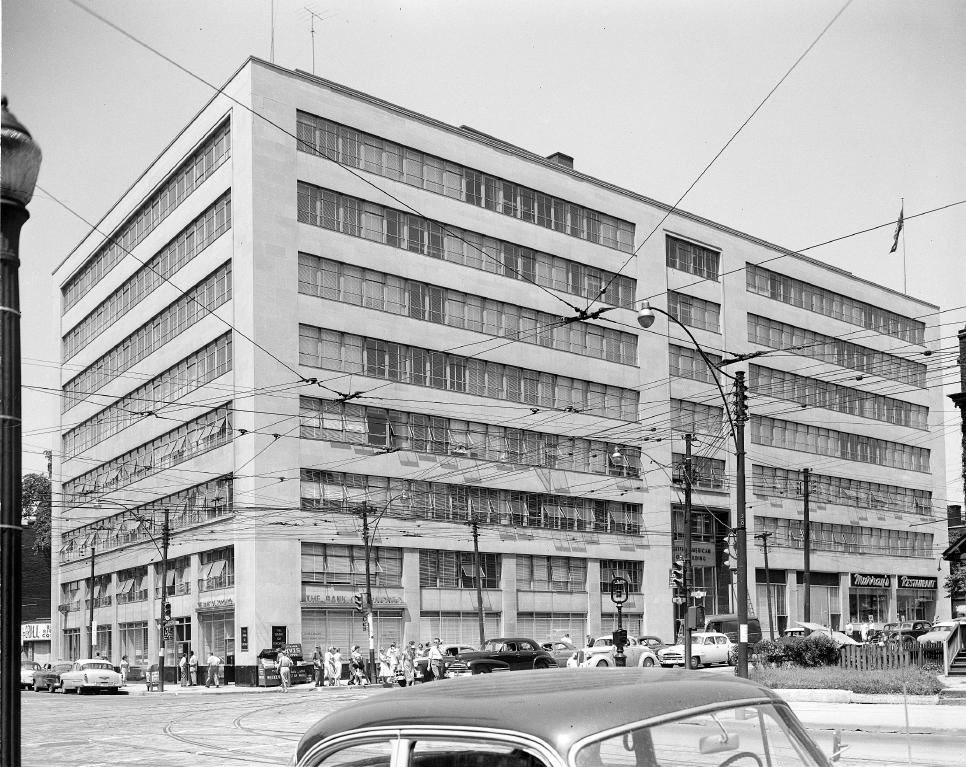
The company's head office at 800 Bay Street was designed by Peter Dickinson of Page & Steele.

In the 1930s, B/A established its own fleet of tanker ships to operate on the Great Lakes: The Britamoil (photo), the Britamolene, the Britamette, the Britamlube, and the Britamaco. B/A built Canada's first absorption plant at Longview, Alberta in 1934 to extract gasoline from "wet gas", a mixture of natural gas and gasoline. B/A also built pipelines from well-heads to refineries as well as purchasing several oil refineries in Alberta, and Saskatchewan. By 1938 B/A was constructing a new refinery in Calgary, Alberta, it operated 5 ocean tankers, 5 lake tankers, and 450 railway tank cars. B/A's subsidiaries extended into several U.S. states, including wells on the grounds of the Oklahoma State Capitol building.

During the Second World War, the Clarkson, Ontario plant was modified to produce aviation fuel, the B/A tanker fleet was redirected for cross-Atlantic service, and B/A completed the Montreal–Portland pipeline to provide year-round delivery of crude oil from Venezuela to the Montreal East Refinery. B/A constructed a gas re-pressurizing and recycling system at Longview, Alberta to conserve the declining resources of the Turner Valley Field. During construction of the Alaska Highway, B/A provided more than 100 large storage tanks at various locations along the highway to provide the U.S. Army Corps of Engineers with fuel. B/A expanded in the U.S. with wells near Casper, Wyoming. In 1946 B/A expanded its operations from coast to coast with the purchase of the Canadian assets of Union Oil Company of Canada, including the former British Columbia Refining Company Ltd. refinery in Port Moody, British Columbia, and its distribution network on the West Coast and Vancouver Island; and in 1946 began distribution of its products in Newfoundland. After the war, the Gulf Oil Corporation acquired 20% ownership of B/A.

In the 1950s, senior management at B/A became more integrated with Gulf Oil Corp as Gulf's ownership increased. New refineries were opened in Edmonton and Moose Jaw, and the company's tanker fleet expanded to 22. B/A constructed a new eight-storey headquarters building in Toronto. In 1955 the company's oil production reached a record 10.5 million barrels and its reserves of 113 million barrels of crude oil and 404 billion cubic feet of gas, with the total annual refinery output exceeding 33 million barrels.

During the 1940s, 1950s and 1960s, in addition to petroleum products, B/A also issued its own credit cards, road maps, monthly Timely Station Topics Magazine and B/A Commentator Magazine, and sponsored a television game show.

In 1966, B/A sold its remaining US assets, the British-American Oil Producing Company, to Dallas-based Chared Corporation.

By the 1960s, B/A owned and operated over 9,300 service stations, approximately 25% of all stations in Canada. These were operated under names that included B/A, Anglo-Canadian, Purity 99, Red Head, and Royalite. B/A established the Purity 99 Oil Company Limited to manage the marketing of all of their stations; Royalite managed the service operations; and B/A the production and supply.

=== Merger with Canadian Gulf ===
Gulf Oil Corporation had begun operating in Canada in 1942, and in 1944 created a subsidiary called Canadian Gulf Oil Company. Gulf started purchasing British American stock in the 1940s, making an initial acquisition of 247,672 shares, and later raising its stake to 2,322,811. This equated to 25.6 per cent of the company, giving Gulf the controlling interest. In 1956, Gulf merged its Canadian subsidiary with British American in a deal that gave the illusion of the Canadian company acquiring the American. To merge the companies, British American issued 8.3 million shares (valued at $55.6 million) to the Gulf Oil Corporation, and then used the money to acquire Canadian Gulf Oil. Gulf Oil held a 59.8 per cent stake in the new merged entity. Recent changes to Canadian tax law allowed buyers to access unused tax write-offs of companies they acquired. Canadian Gulf had considerable unused write-offs, and thus British American was able to decrease its income tax by $29.7 million.

Following the merger, Gulf Oil continued to increase its stake in British American. In 1958, as part of an issuance of 2 million shares, it grew its holdings to 57.8 percent. Then in 1962 Gulf purchased another 1.8 million shares, bringing its ownership to 62.2 percent. By 1968 it owned 68.9 per cent of British American, bringing its total investment to $440 million.

In 1962, British American made a series of acquisitions of major Canadian companies. These included Royalite Oil Company Limited, the Anglo-American Exploration Company Limited, and Superior Propane Limited. In 1968 it acquired a 33 per cent interest in Shawinigan Chemicals from Gulf Oil.

At a special meeting of the shareholders held on 15 November 1968 at the Park Plaza Hotel in Toronto, shareholders voted to merge British American, Royalite, and Shawinigan into a single company called Gulf Oil Canada Limited. The new entity was officially incorporated on 1 April 1969.

== Leadership ==
=== President ===
1. Albert Leroy Ellsworth, 1906–1943
2. William Kepler Whiteford Sr., 1943–1952
3. Ole Berg Jr., 1952–1955
4. Milton Streuer Beringer, 1955–1958
5. Ernest Delwin Brockett Jr., 1958–1959
6. Edward Dean Loughney, 1960–1964
7. Charles Cecil Hay, 1964–1969

=== Chairman of the Board ===
1. Albert Leroy Ellsworth, 1943–1950
2. William Kepler Whiteford Sr., 1950–1951
3. Milton Streuer Beringer, 1951–1958
4. Clarence Day Shepard QC, 1964–1969
