= List of oil facilities in Montreal =

This is a list of oil facilities in Montreal, Quebec.

== Refineries ==
=== Commercial refineries ===
- Suncor Energy - Montreal Refinery (137 000 bpd), formerly known as the Petro-Canada - Montreal Refinery, prior to merger with Suncor Energy in Aug 2009. The Montreal Refinery is located inside the Pointe-aux-Trembles/Rivières-des-Prairies borough in the Montreal city on Sherbrooke East Street. When it was founded, it was called the Petrofina Montreal Refinery. This refinery has the same refining capacity as the Shell Canada refinery. It was founded in 1955 inside the square formed by Sherbooke East, Saint-Jean Baptiste, Marien and the Highway 40. It's the third refinery of this refining centre. It has a Total Commercial Refining Capacity of 137 000 bpd.

=== Industrial refineries ===
- The Petromont S.E.C. refinery is located in Varennes city in the south shore of Montreal. This refinery is actually in stand-by but the plant hasn't been destroyed. It made some petrochemical product essentially and some products for the Montreal oil industries. Petromont is owned by Dow Chemical and the Société générale de financement du Québec. Its Total Industrial Refining Capacity is 58 000 bpd.

== Closed refineries ==
- The Shell Canada - Montreal East Refinery (161 000 bpd) is located in the Montréal-Est city on Sherbrooke Street East. This refinery was founded in 1931, the second Montreal refinery after the Imperial Oil (Esso) Refinery. The refinery is located near to petrochemical industries like Coastal Petrochemical, Shell Chemical, Parachem petrochemical, Interquisa Canada, and Marsulex (Sulconam) Canada. This refinery has some essential petrochemical infrastructure required to complete oil-refining. On June 4, 2010, Shell Canada officially announced they would downgrade the refinery into a terminal, following unsuccessful attempts to find a buyer to take over the plant.
- The Montreal East Refinery run by Gulf Oil Canada Ltd. is a small refinery located inside the Coastal Petrochemical fields. It is located inside the Montréal-Est city close to the petrochemical infrastructures. It is the only refinery which restarted since the massive closure of refineries in the 80s.
- The Texaco Montreal East Refinery was located on the current grounds of Interquisa Canada on Gamble Avenue. It was near the Imperial Oil Ltd. refinery. It was founded in the 60s and operated for only twenty years. The closure of the Texaco refinery coincided with those of the refineries of Imperial Oil Ltd., Gulf Canada, and BP. These massive closures of refineries were made in the 80s during the oil crisis.
- The BP Montreal East/Anjou Refinery was situated on the current grounds of the Metropolitan golf club in the Anjou district of the city of Montreal. It was the only refinery to be built in the North of the metropolitan freeway. It produced gasoline for twenty years but the oil crisis in the Middle East forced its closure in the 80s.
- The Imperial Oil Ltd. Esso Montreal East Refinery was the first Montreal refinery. It was founded in 1913, three years after the founding of the city of Montréal-Est. The facility refined oil for more than 70 years and it returned service to the east Montrealers. It was constantly evolving and during the last years of its operation, the company made massive investments to strengthen the refinery's position in the market.

== Petrochemical plants ==
- Coastal Petrochemical
  - The Coastal Petrochemical Company is quite new, the result of a restart by the company Interquisa Canada. Indeed, this company once carried the name of Kemtec Petrochemical. Today, this petrochemical complex make para-xylene, benzene and toluene, and previously phenol and acetones. The Coastal Petrochemical company is a commercial partner with Parachem petrochemical, Selenis Canada and Interquisa Canada.
- Kemtec Petrochemical
  - The Kemtec Petrochemical Company was a company with products similar to that of Coastal Petrochemical. Its transformed and finished products are practically the same, except in the case of the phenol and the acetones where Coastal made dismantle the industrial units. It is in Montréal-Est (North: Highway 40 / Petromont / Ultramar Terminal; South: Bitumar Bitum and BurPak Plant / Montreal Pipeline Ltd.; East: Gulf Oil Canada Montreal East Refinery / Parachem Petrochemical; West: PttPoly Canada (Shell Chemicals) / Shell Canada Montreal East Refinery).
- Selenis Canada (img group), Montréal-Est (North: Highway 40 / Coastal Petrochemical; South: Montreal Pipeline Ltd.; East: Parachem Petrochemical / Bitumar Bitum and BurPak Plant; West: Shell Canada Montreal East Refinery)
- Nova Chemical, Montreal (North: Petro-Canada Montreal Refinery; East: Petro-Canada Montreal Refinery; West: McAsphalt Plant)
- Parachem Petrochemical, Montréal-Est (North: Ultramar Terminal; South: Gulf Oil Canada Montreal East Refinery; * East: Ultramar Terminal / Marsulex (Sulconam); West: Coastal Petrochemical)
- Interquisa Canada, Montréal-Est (North: Shell Canada Montreal East Refinery / LaFarge Inc.; South: Canterm Canadian Terminal; East: Imperial Oil Ltd. fields / Ashland Canada; West: LaFarge Inc.)
- Basell Polyolefins, Varennes (South: Petromont S.E.C. - Varennes Plant; West: Kronos Canada / Greendfield Ethanol)
- Petromont S.E.C., Montréal-Est (North: Karbomont, South: Shell Canada Montreal East Refinery)

== Terminals ==
- Vopak Terminals of Eastern Canada Inc.
- Norcan Terminal
- Shell Canada Terminals
  - Rivières-des-Prairies Terminal
  - Port of Montreal Terminal
- Ultramar (Valero) Terminal, connected to the Jean Gaulin refinery at Levis, near Quebec City, by the Pipeline Saint-Laurent.
- Suncor Energy Terminals
  - Pointe-aux-Trembles Terminal
  - Montreal East Terminal
- Coastal Petrochemical Terminal, a tenant on the property of Ultramar. It stores petrochemical products such as para-xylene, toluene, phenol, acetone and many other products. This location is near homes in Montreal-East.

== Pipelines companies ==
- Montreal Pipelines Ltd., owned by J. Ian McAvity.
- Trans-Northern Pipeline Ltd.
- Pipeline Saint-Laurent, owned by Energie Valero, transports refined product from Valero's Jean Gaulin refinery at Levis, near Quebec City, to a distribution terminal in Montreal.
- Petromont Pipelines
- Portland-Montreal Pipe Line, pipeline from the port at Portland, Maine, to supply crude oil to Montreal.
- Enbridge Line 9B, pipeline connection to southern Ontario. Originally built to supply western crude to Montreal refineries, it was subsequently reversed due to move cheaper imported crudes to Ontario. Reversed again due to changes in market conditions to move crude eastward in 2015. Currently supplies Suncor refinery. Valero also moves product to Montreal on line 9B, to be loaded on tankers to transport feedstocks to its refinery at Levis.

== Bitum Companies ==
- Bitumar
- McAsphalt
