= Montréal-Est =

- City
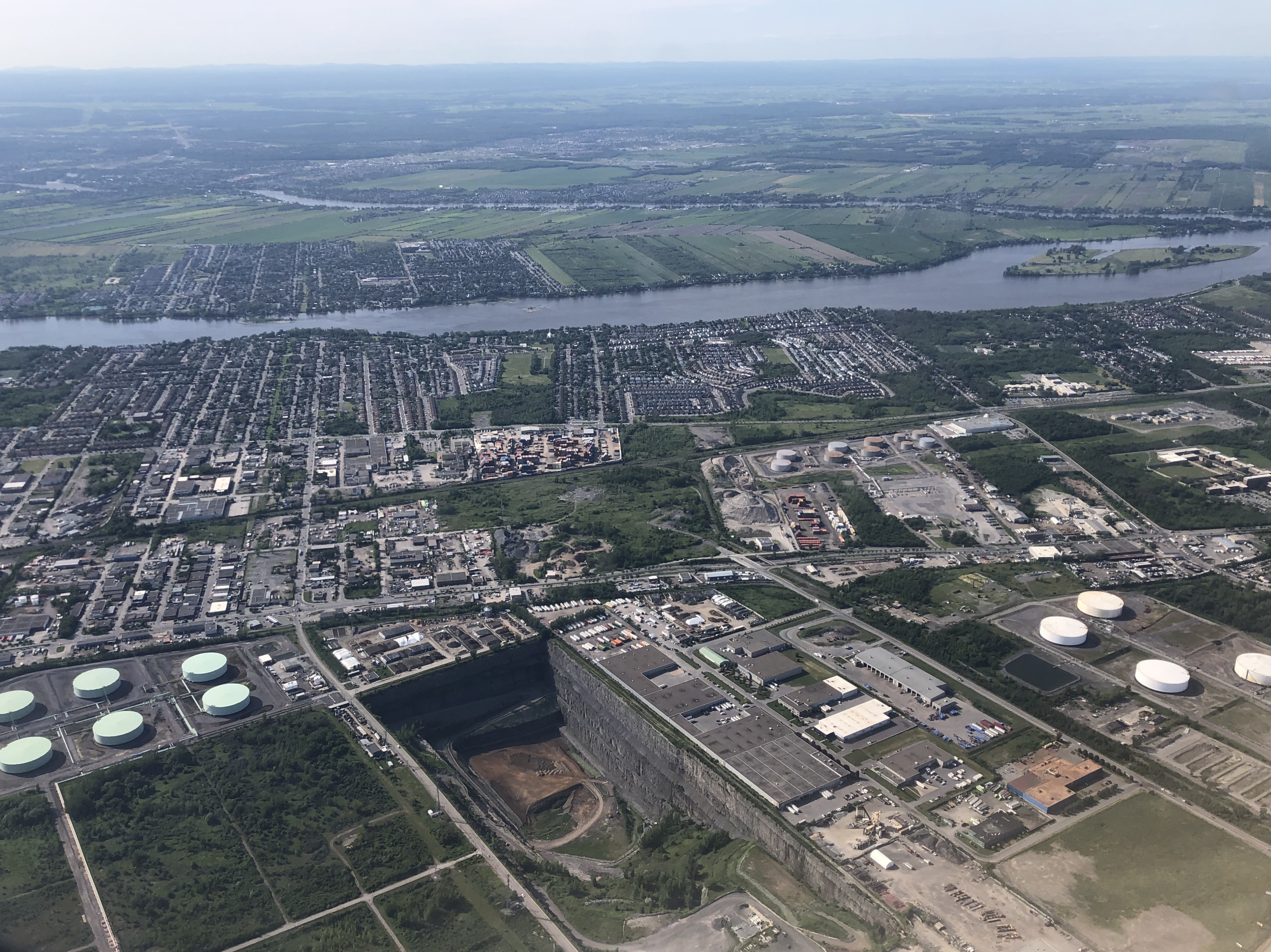

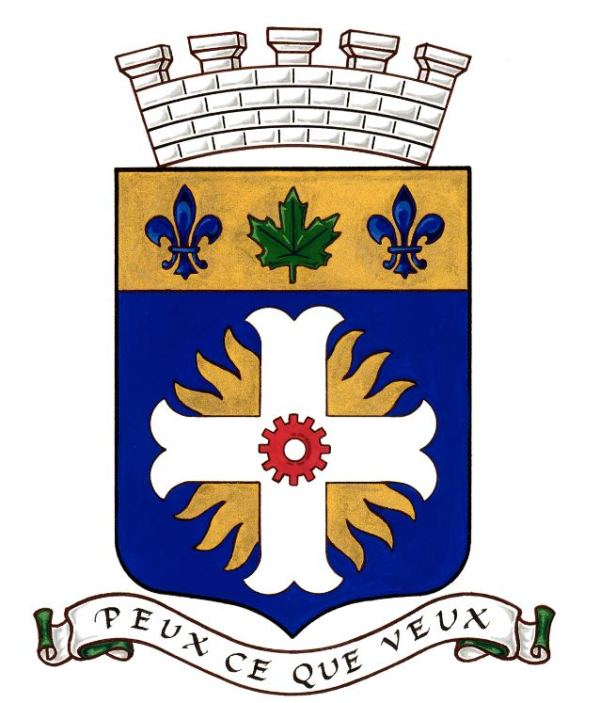
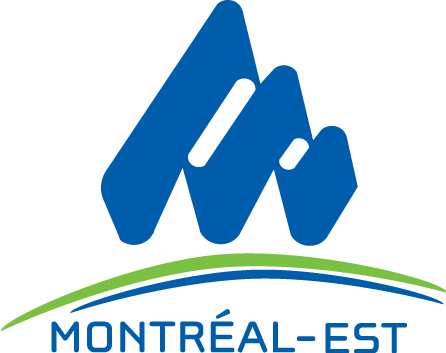
- Coat of arms Logo
- Motto: Peux ce que Veux
- Location on the Island of Montreal

- Location in southern Quebec
- Coordinates: 45.63°N 73.52°W
- Country: Canada
- Province: Quebec
- Region: Montreal
- UA: Urban agglomeration of Montreal
- Creation: June 4, 1910
- Constituted: January 1, 2006

Government
  - Mayor: Anne St-Laurent
  - Federal riding: La Pointe-de-l'Île
  - Prov. riding: Pointe-aux-Trembles

Area
  - Total: 13.96 km^{2} (5.39 sq mi)
  - Land: 12.15 km^{2} (4.69 sq mi)

Population (2021)
  - Total: 4,394
  - Density: 361.6/km^{2} (937/sq mi)
  - Pop. (2016–21): ▲14.1%
  - Dwellings: 2,124
- Time zone: UTC−5 (EST)
  - Summer (DST): UTC−4 (EDT)
- Postal code(s): H1B
- Area codes: 514 and 438
- Highways A-40: R-138
- Website: ville.montreal-est.qc.ca

Montréal-Est (French for 'Montreal East', pronounced [mɔ̃ʁeal ɛst]) is an on-island suburb in southwestern Quebec, Canada, on the island of Montreal. Montreal-Est has been home to many large oil refineries since 1915.

== History ==
The formation of Montréal-Est as a municipality was initiated in 1910 by businessman Joseph Versailles, who had bought 6 square kilometres (2.3 sq mi) of land there. The town was incorporated on 4 June 1910 under the name Montreal East, when it separated from Pointe-aux-Trembles and Saint-Joseph-de-la-Rivière-des-Prairies. Versailles was mayor of the town until his death in 1931.

On January 1, 2002, as part of the 2002–2006 municipal reorganization of Montreal, it was merged into the City of Montreal and became part of the borough of Rivière-des-Prairies–Pointe-aux-Trembles–Montréal-Est. After a change of government and a 2004 referendum, it was the only community in the eastern half of the Island of Montreal that de-merged, and it was re-constituted as a city on January 1, 2006.

== Demographics ==
Historical populations

Year	Pop.	±%
1966	5,779	—
1971	5,075	−12.2%
1976	4,372	−13.9%
1981	3,778	−13.6%
1986	3,592	−4.9%
1991	3,767	+4.9%

Year	Pop.	±%
1996	3,523	−6.5%
2001	3,547	+0.7%
2006	3,822	+7.8%
2011	3,728	−2.5%
2016	3,850	+3.3%
2021	4,394	+14.1%

Source: Statistics Canada

In the 2021 Canadian census conducted by Statistics Canada, Montréal-Est had a population of 4,394 living in 2,018 of its 2,124 total private dwellings, a change of 14.1% from its 2016 population of 3,850. With a land area of 12.15 km^{2} (4.69 sq mi), it had a population density of 361.6/km^{2} (936.7/sq mi) in 2021.

Home language (2021)
Language	Population	Percentage
French	3,685	87%
English	215	5%
Other languages	195	5%

Mother tongue (2021)
Language	Population	Percentage
French	3,460	81%
English	180	4%
Other languages	435	10%

Visible minorities (2021)
Ethnicity	Population	Percentage
Not a visible minority	3,445	80.9%
Visible minorities	805	18.9%

== Economy ==
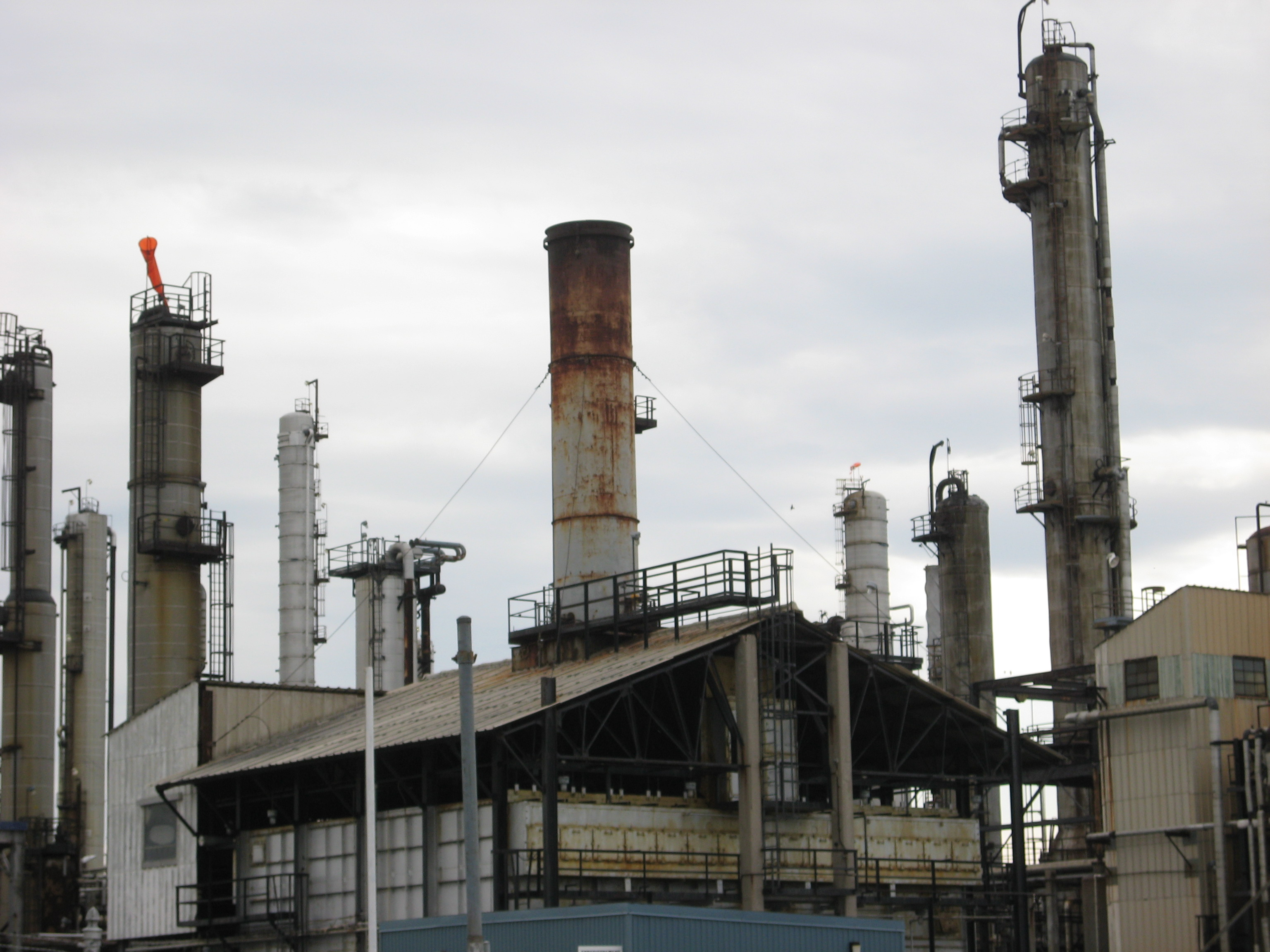
Gulf Montreal Refinery

There are three refineries that make up the majority of the Montreal Oil Refining Centre:

- Shell Canada Montreal East Refinery : formerly produced 161,000 barrels per day (bpd) before conversion to a storage facility
- Petro-Canada Montreal Refinery : 160,000 bpd
- Gulf Canada/Kemtec/Coastal Canada Montreal East Refinery: 65,000 bpd

Total production: 386,000 bpd

== Local government ==
Montréal-Est federal election results
Year	Liberal		Conservative		Bloc Québécois		New Democratic		Green	
2021	29%	487	8%	131	49%	834	9%	151	0%	0
2019	24%	438	14%	260	47%	841	10%	178	4%	63

Montréal-Est provincial election results
Year	CAQ		Liberal		QC solidaire		Parti Québécois	
2018	35%	597	12%	202	18%	304	33%	569
2014	25%	449	22%	395	7%	133	43%	757

Montréal-Est forms part of the federal electoral district of La Pointe-de-l'Île and has been represented by Mario Beaulieu of the Bloc Québécois since 2015. Provincially, Montréal-Est is part of the Pointe-aux-Trembles electoral district and is represented by Chantal Rouleau of the Coalition Avenir Québec since 2018.

List of former mayors:

- Joseph Versailles (1910–1931)
- Adélard Rivet (1931)
- Albert Berthiaume (1931–1933)
- J.-A. Napoléon Courtemanche (1933–1952)
- Joseph-Émile-Roland MacDuff (1952–1962)
- Édouard Rivet (1962–1982)
- Yvon Labrosse (1982–2002, 2006–2009)
- Robert Coutu (2009–2021)
- Anne St-Laurent (2021–present)

== Attractions ==
The Dufresne-Nincheri Museum, a historic building in the borough of Mercier–Hochelaga-Maisonneuve in Montreal, has the mission to preserve, study, and influence the history and heritage of Montréal-Est (East Montreal). It was originally named the Château Dufresne Museum.

== Transportation ==
Montréal-Est is served by Notre-Dame Street and Sherbrooke Street, which run east-west through large portions of the Island of Montreal.

Montréal-Est joined Westmount as the only Montreal island municipalities to refuse to adopt the name of Boulevard René-Lévesque for their portion of the major east-west street, Dorchester. To this day, the street is called Rue Dorchester in Montréal-Est. It also preserves a section of Rue de Montigny, which has otherwise been replaced by Boulevard de Maisonneuve apart from one block downtown. Rue Sainte-Catherine and Rue Ontario also reappear in Montréal-Est, far away from their main downtown sections.

North-south streets in the city include Avenue Georges-V and Avenue Marien.

== Education ==
The city is served by two school boards. The French schools are part of the Commission scolaire Pointe-de-l'Ile while the English schools are part of the English Montreal School Board.

Francophone schools:

- École primaire St-Octave

== Notable people ==
- Roméo Dallaire, Lieutenant-General (retired), Canadian senator, author
- Michel Plasse, professional hockey player (1948–2006)
