= Montreal East Refinery (Gulf Oil Canada) =

Refinery in Canada

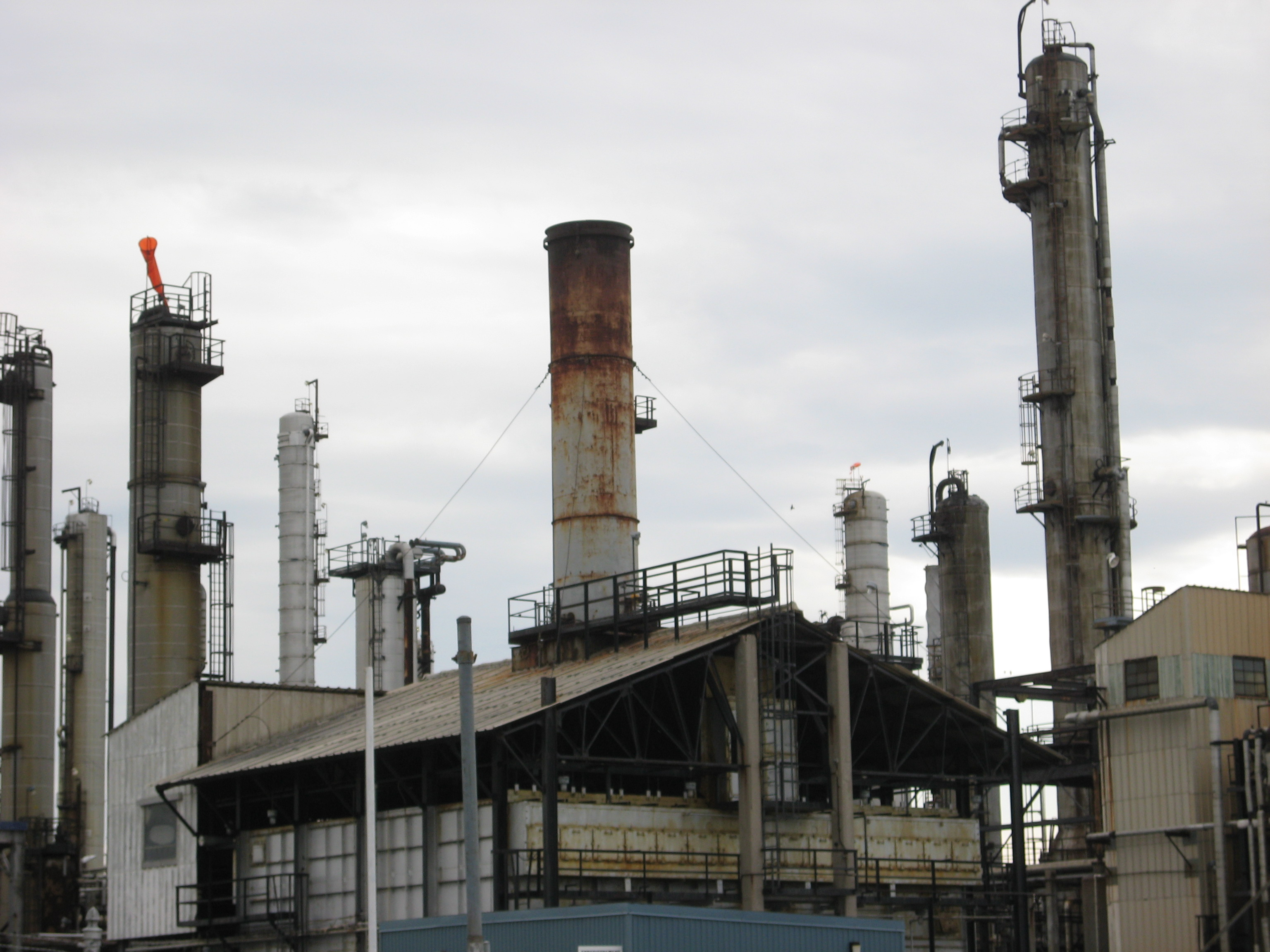
- View a refinery unit from the Broadway South street in Montréal-Est city
- Interactive map of Montreal East Refinery
- Location: Montréal-Est, Quebec, Canada; 45.63369°N 73.52261°W

Refinery details
- Operator: Coastal Petrochemical
- Owner: Coastal Petrochemical
- Opened: 1963
- Closed: 1983; Restart 2003
- Capacity: 70,000 barrels per day (11,000 m^{3}/d)
- No. of employees: 75
- Refining units: alkylation, isomerisation, distillation of crude oil, reforming catalytic, cracking catalytic, thermal catalytic
- Refining center: Montreal

The Montreal East Refinery (Gulf Canada) is a small petrochemical refinery located inside the city of Montréal-Est and inside the Coastal Petrochemical fields. The operator of the refining unit is Coastal Petrochemical (Petrochimie Coastal du Canada).

== History ==
The refinery was constructed by British-American Oil Company in the 1930s to process crude oil imported from Texas. It was shut down by B/A's successor company, Gulf Canada, in 1983. Ultramar Canada purchased the 74,000 b/d capacity facility. refinery from Gulf Canada in 1986 and closed it soon after with the loss of 450 jobs. In June 1986 Montreal-based engineering firm Lavalin Inc. announced it was purchasing the refinery and would re-open it. In 1986 the refinery and its 210 000 m2 site was sold to Kemtec Petrochemicals which converted the plant to produce paraxylene. The plant came on line in 1989 and operated until 1991. That year Kemtec filed for bankruptcy. The site was determined to be heavily contaminated and, facing potentially large clean-up costs, all creditors of the company except the Government of Quebec declined to take over the property.

== Recent operations ==
In 1994 the refinery was purchased by Coastal Canada Petroleum, Inc., (CCP) a subsidiary of Houston-based Coastal Corporation, for US$1.2 million. CCP acquired the processing equipment, entered into a long-term lease for the site, and agreed to make payments to an environmental trust fund for remediation of the contaminated site.

== See also ==
- Montreal Oil Refining Center
- Montreal East Refinery (Shell Canada)
- Montreal Refinery
