= Royalite Oil Company =

Canadian petroleum company (1921–1969)

- Industry: Petroleum
- Founded: 18 January 1921
- Defunct: 1 April 1969
- Fate: Merged with British American Oil Company and Shawinigan Chemicals
- Successor: Gulf Oil Canada
- Headquarters: Royalite Building, 615 2 St SW, Calgary, Alberta

The Royalite Oil Company, Limited was a Canadian integrated petroleum company that existed from 1921 to 1969. Royalite was founded by Imperial Oil through the acquisition and reorganisation of Calgary Petroleum Products.

Royalite was incorporated as a dominion corporation on 18 January 1921 with a capitalisation of $1 million. The company's founding directors were Alexander Hannah, Percy LeRoy Sanford, George Crichton Stuart Crosby, Harold Claire Johnston, and Walter Kingsley.

On Sunday, 16 January 1949, Imperial sold its 90 per cent stake in Royalite to Dominion Securities for around $15 million. The decision was based on the recognition that Imperial and Royalite increasingly were market competitors, which placed Imperial in an untenable position relative to its ownership of Royalite.

In the fall of 1962, the British American Oil Company of Toronto offered to purchase all outstanding shares of Royalite. At the time, around 40 per cent of Royalite's share were owned by Montreal's Bronfman family. By the summer of 1963, BA's share of Royalite had reached 96 per cent.

In October 1968, British American announced that it intended to change its name to Gulf Oil Canada Limited, and that its subsidiaries Royalite and Shawinigan would be amalgamated into it. Royalite would hold a special meeting on 12 November in Calgary to vote on the proposal, while BA would hold a vote in Toronto on 15 November. At the Royalite meeting, 99.65 per cent of shares represented voted in favour of the proposal. Likewise, three days later BA shareholders voted in favour of the proposal. British American changed its name to Gulf Oil Canada on 1 January 1969. On 1 April 1969, Royalite merged into Gulf, bringing an end to the company after 48 years.

== Leadership ==
=== President ===
1. Alexander Murray McQueen, 18 January 1921 – 8 April 1926
2. The Viscount Bennett, 8 April 1926 – 30 April 1930
3. John Harlton McLeod, 30 April 1930 – 9 June 1944 †
4. Philip Francis Shannon, 16 June 1944 – 10 May 1946
5. Alexander Hannah, 10 May 1946 – 10 June 1947 †
6. Sydney Frank Heard, 23 August 1947 – 15 July 1950
7. Carl U. Daniels, 15 July 1950 – 16 June 1955
8. Ray Lee Althouse, 16 June 1955 – 25 October 1958
9. Charles Cecil Hay, 25 October 1958 – November 1964
10. John Lawson Valens, November 1964 – 31 December 1968

=== Chairman of the Board ===
1. Alexander Murray McQueen, 8 April 1926 – 4 December 1933 †
2. Kenneth McKinnon Pringle, April 1949 – December 1950
3. Carl U. Daniels, 16 June 1955 – 1 September 1958
4. Charles Cecil Hay, November 1964 – 31 December 1968
