= Montreal East Refinery (Shell Canada) =

Oil refinery located in Montreal East

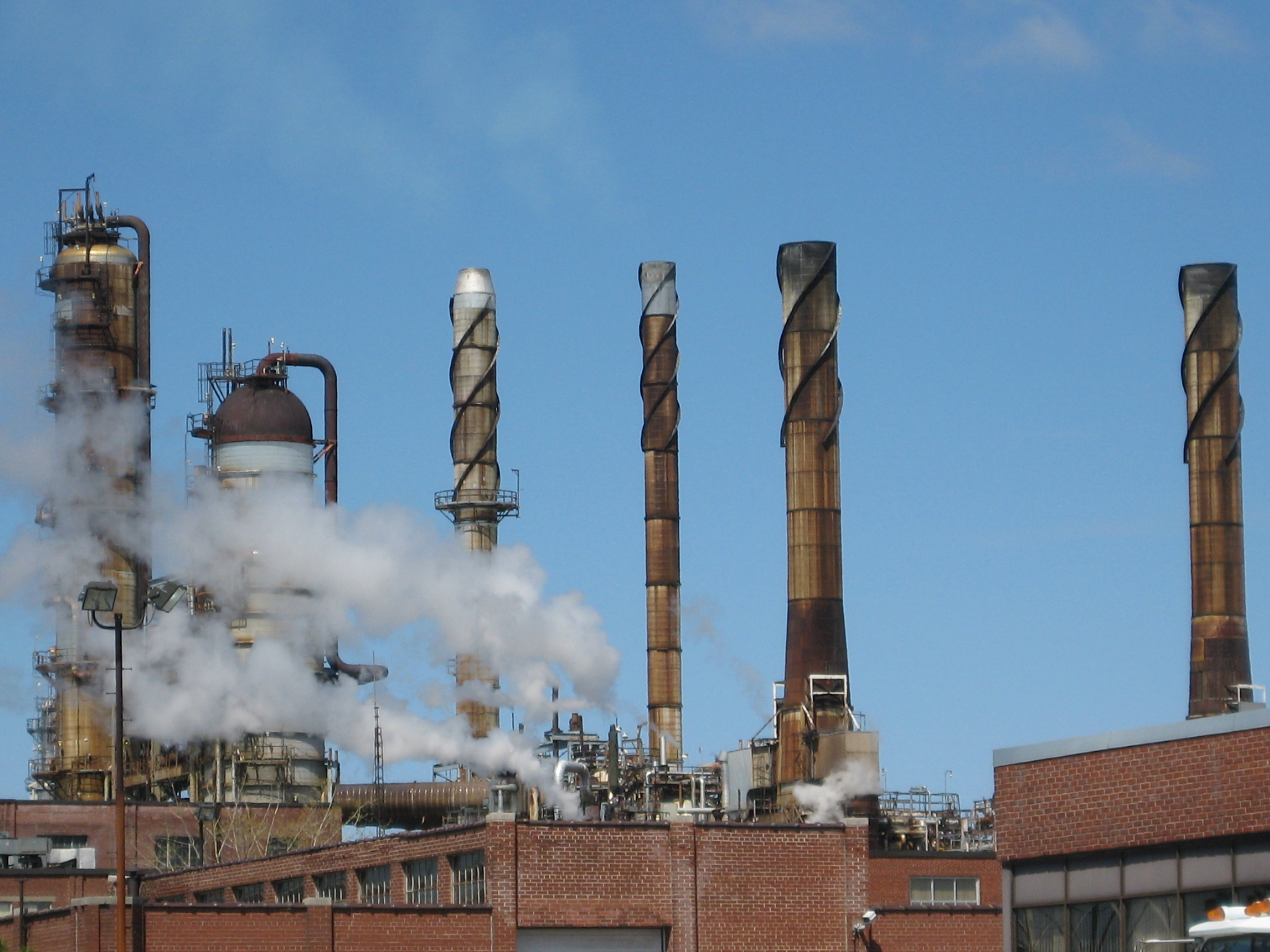
- View of the Distillation of crude oil unit (now defunct) from the Sherbrooke East street

- Location within Quebec
- Location: Montreal East, Quebec, Canada; 45°37′31″N 73°31′49″W

Refinery details
- Operator: Shell Canada (Soon Delek US)
- Owner: Shell Canada (Soon Delek US)
- Opened: 1933
- Capacity: 161,000 barrels per day (25,600 m^{3}/d)
- No. of employees: 100
- Refining units: alkylation, isomerisation, distillation of crude oil, hydrocracking, reforming catalytic, cracking catalytic, thermal catalytic, desulphuration
- No. of oil tanks: 154 (discontinued use)
- Refining center: Montreal

The Montreal East Refinery (French: Raffinerie de Montréal-Est) was an oil refinery located in Montreal East and formerly Shell Canada's largest refinery. In October 2010, refinery operations permanently ceased and the facility was subsequently converted into a storage terminal.

== History ==
The defunct refinery, the second owned by Shell in Canada, opened on 24 March 1933. It began with three units; the distillation unit, a topping unit, and cracking catalytic unit. In 1947 it was expanded with the building of the alkylation and catalytic cracking refining units, and the refining capacity of was increased. From 1947 to 1960, the isomerisation, catalytic reforming, chemicals plants were built and the refining capacity was further increased. During 2002 to 2008, desulphuration units were built and the refining capacity was upgraded to its highest level 161,000 barrels per day (25,600 m^{3}/d).

Increase of the refining capacity
Year	Capacity (barrels per day)
1933	5,000
1947	40,000
1951	55,000
1956	75,000
1965	124,000
2003	129,000
2005	133,000
2007	161,000

On January 7, 2010 Shell Canada announced closing the refinery and converting it to a fuel terminal. On June 4, 2010, following the unsuccessful attempts to find a buyer to take over the plant, Shell Canada announced its plans to move forward to downgrade the refinery into a terminal. The conversion commenced in September 2010, with it permanently ceasing operations as a refinery in October 2010. Approximately 800 jobs were lost.

== Description ==
The refinery consisted of two refining units with capacities of 103,000 barrels per day (16,400 m^{3}/d) and 58,000 barrels per day (9,200 m^{3}/d). It had alkylation, hydro-cracking, reforming catalytic, cracking catalytic, thermal catalytic, isomerisation, and desulphiration units. Its processing capacities included:

- 14,610 barrels per day (2,323 m^{3}/d) of visbreaking
- 27,900 barrels per day (4,440 m^{3}/d) of fluid catalytic cracking
- 20,910 barrels per day (3,324 m^{3}/d) of semi-regenerative catalytic reforming
- 14,100 barrels per day (2,240 m^{3}/d) of hydrocracking for distillate upgrading
- 49,500 barrels per day (7,870 m^{3}/d) of catalytic hydrotreating for cat reformer feeds
- 27,000 barrels per day (4,300 m^{3}/d) of hydrotreating for kerosene/jet desulfurization
- 2,700 barrels per day (430 m^{3}/d) of API Group I base oil
- 1,300 barrels per day (210 m^{3}/d) of unfinished wax. The refinery had 154 oil tanks and more than 450 workers.

After its conversion to a storage terminal, the facility receives gasoline, diesel and aviation fuels for distribution.

== See also ==
- Montreal Refinery
- Montreal East Refinery (Gulf Oil Canada)
- Montreal Oil Refining Center
- Scotford Refinery
- Corunna Refinery
- Nanticoke Refinery
