= Tom Bedecki =

Biographical details
- Born: May 4, 1929; Glace Bay, Nova Scotia
- Died: December 15, 1993 (aged 64)
- Education: St. Francis Xavier University; Springfield College

Playing career
- ?: St. Francis Xavier

Coaching career (HC unless noted)
- 1955–1958: Colorado College
- 1963–1965: Ohio State

Head coaching record
- Overall: 65–42–1 (.606)
- Tournaments: 2–0 (1.000)

Accomplishments and honors

Championships
- 1957 NCAA National Champion

Thomas George Bedecki (May 4, 1929 – December 15, 1993) was a Canadian ice hockey player, and college ice hockey head coach at University of Ottawa, Colorado College, and Ohio State University.

== Education ==
Bedecki attended St. Francis Xavier University in Antigonish, Nova Scotia where he also played hockey. He earned an M.A. in Education from Springfield College in 1953.

== Career as coach ==
Bedecki started his head coaching career at University of Ottawa before accepting the same position at Colorado College in June 1955. At CC, Bedecki lead the Tigers to the school's second NCAA championship in 1957 with a 13–6 win over the Michigan Wolverines. The 13 goals remains tied (along with the 1950 Colorado College team) for most goals scored in an NCAA championship game. Bedecki resigned abruptly following his third season in 1958. He owned a 59–28–1 record as Colorado College's head coach.

In 1963, Ohio State University established a varsity ice hockey program and chose Bedecki as its first head coach. Bedecki coached the Buckeyes for two seasons compiling a 6–14–0 record before resigning in March 1965.

== Head coaching record ==
Record table
Season	Team	Overall	Conference	Standing	Postseason
Colorado College Tigers (WIHL) (1955–1958)
1955–56	Colorado College	17–11–0	10–8–0	3rd	
1956–57	Colorado College	25–5–0	14–4–0	1st	National Champion
1957–58	Colorado College	17–12–1	11–9–0	3rd	
Colorado College:		59–28–1	35–21–1		
Ohio State Buckeyes Independent (1963–1965)
1963–64	Ohio State	2–8–0			
1964–65	Ohio State	4–6–0			
Ohio State:		6–14–0			
Total:		65–42–1			
National champion Postseason invitational champion Conference regular season champion Conference regular season and conference tournament champion Division regular season champion Division regular season and conference tournament champion Conference tournament champion
