= 1957 NCAA men's ice hockey tournament =

College ice hockey tournament

- Teams: 4
- Finals site: Broadmoor Ice Palace, Colorado Springs, Colorado
- Champions: Colorado College Tigers (2nd title)
- Runner-up: Michigan Wolverines (7th title game)
- Semifinalists: Clarkson Golden Knights (1st Frozen Four); Harvard Crimson (2nd Frozen Four)
- Winning coach: Tom Bedecki (1st title)
- MOP: Bob McCusker (Colorado College)

The 1957 NCAA Men's Ice Hockey Tournament was the culmination of the 1956–57 NCAA men's ice hockey season, the 10th such tournament in NCAA history. It was held between March 14 and 16, 1957, and concluded with Colorado College defeating Michigan 13–6. All games were played at the Broadmoor Ice Palace in Colorado Springs, Colorado.

Colorado College tied their own record for most goals scored in a championship game with 13. Additionally, the 6 goals that Michigan scored made it the title match with the highest number of combined goals scored (19).

== Qualifying teams ==
Four teams qualified for the tournament, two each from the eastern and western regions. The two best WIHL teams and a Tri-State League representative received bids into the tournament as did one independent school.

East							West						
Seed	School	Conference	Record	Berth type	Appearance	Last bid	Seed	School	Conference	Record	Berth type	Appearance	Last bid
1	Harvard	Independent	21–3–0	At-Large	2nd	1955	1	Colorado College	WIHL	23–5–0	At-Large	7th	1955
2	Clarkson	Tri-State League	18–2–0	At-Large	1st	Never	2	Michigan	WIHL	17–4–2	At-Large	10th	1956

== Format ==
The eastern team judged as better was seeded as the top eastern team while the WIHL champion was given the top western seed. The second eastern seed was slotted to play the top western seed and vice versa. All games were played at the Broadmoor Ice Palace. All matches were Single-game eliminations with the semifinal winners advancing to the national championship game and the losers playing in a consolation game.

== Bracket ==
Semifinals; March 14–15
W1	Colorado College	5
E2	Clarkson	3
E1	Harvard	1
W2	Michigan	6

Championship Game; March 16
W1	Colorado College	13
W2	Michigan	6
Consolation Game
E1	Harvard	1
E2	Clarkson	2*

Note: * denotes overtime period(s)

=== Semifinals ===
==== Colorado College vs. Clarkson ====
March 14	Colorado College	5 – 3	Clarkson	Broadmoor Ice Palace
(Hay, Wishart) Bob McCusker - 10:12		First period	07:43 - Bob Van Lammers (Rowe)
(Hersack) Bunt Hubchik - 13:31 (McGhee, Hay) Bob McCusker - 16:14		Second period	No Scoring
(unassisted) Bob McCusker - 12:57 (Harasyn, deRappard) John Andrews - 15:32		Third period	06:11 - Bob Van Lammers (Quartermain); 18:09 - Donald Gilchrist (Howell)
Bob Southwood ( 18 saves )		Goalie stats	( 55 saves ) Eddie MacDonald

==== Harvard vs. Michigan ====
March 15	Harvard	1 – 6	Michigan	Broadmoor Ice Palace	Recap
No scoring		First period	14:53 - Ed Switzer (Pitts)
No scoring		Second period	01:09 - Tom Rendall (Starr); 03:07 - Tom Rendall (unassisted); 10:51 - Barrie Hayton (Switzer); 17:15 - Tom Rendall (Schiller, Karpinka)
(Fischer, Vietze) Bob McVey - 15:17		Third period	14:26 - Bob Schiller (McDonald)
Jim Bailey ( 25 saves )		Goalie stats	( 22 saves ) Ross Childs

=== Consolation Game ===
==== Harvard vs. Clarkson ====
March 16	Harvard	1 – 2	2OT	Clarkson	Broadmoor Ice Palace	Recap
No scoring		First period		15:55 - Bob Van Lammers (Rowe)
No scoring		Second period		No scoring
(Cleary) Lyle Guttu - 04:18		Third period		No scoring
No scoring		Second overtime period		06:51 - Ed Rowe (unassisted)
Jim Bailey		Goalie stats		( 44 saves ) Eddie MacDonald

=== Championship Game ===
==== Colorado College vs. Michigan ====
March 16	Colorado College	13 – 6	Michigan	Broadmoor Ice Palace

Scoring summary
Period	Team	Goal	Assist(s)	Time	Score
1st	CC	Bob McCusker	Scott and McGhee	3:15	1–0 CC
1st	CC	Bill Hay	McCusker	8:04	2–0 CC
1st	CC	Bob McCusker	Hay and Capello	11:39	3–0 CC
1st	UM	Dick Dunnigan	unassisted	13:14	3–1 CC
1st	UM	Neil McDonald	unassisted	17:30	3–2 CC
1st	UM	John Hutton	McDonald	17:57	3–3
2nd	CC	Murray Dea	Laughlin	24:52	4–3 CC
2nd	CC	John Andrews	Hubchik	26:18	5–3 CC
2nd	UM	Ed Switzer	Dunnigan	30:18	5–4 CC
2nd	CC	Bill Hay	McCusker and McGhee	34:05	6–4 CC
3rd	CC	Bob McCusker – GW	Dea	41:23	7–4 CC
3rd	CC	Harley Patterson	Harasyn	46:20	8–4 CC
3rd	CC	Don Hersack	Hubchik and Andrews	49:10	9–4 CC
3rd	CC	Harry Harasyn	Patterson	52:59	10–4 CC
3rd	CC	Bob McCusker	Hay	53:47	11–4 CC
3rd	CC	Don Hersack	Hubchik	54:53	12–4 CC
3rd	UM	Tom Rendall	Starr	55:15	12–5 CC
3rd	CC	Don Wishart	deRappard	56:11	13–5 CC
3rd	UM	Neil McDonald	Switzer	56:36	13–6 CC
Penalty summary
Period	Team	Player	Penalty	Time	PIM
1st	CC	Bob Southwood			2:00
1st	CC	Bunt Hubchik			2:00
2nd	UM	Bob Schiller			2:00
2nd	UM	Bob Schiller			2:00
2nd	CC	Gary Hughes			2:00
3rd	UM	Dick Dunnigan			2:00
3rd	UM	Tom Rendall			2:00
3rd	CC	Bob McCusker			2:00
3rd	CC	Gerry Capello			2:00

Shots by period
Team	1	2	3	T
Michigan	9	7	11	27
Colorado College	10	14	17	41

Goaltenders
Team	Name	Saves	Goals against	Time on ice
UM	Ross Childs	28	13	
CC	Bob Southwood	21	6	

== All-Tournament Team ==
=== First Team ===
- G: Eddie MacDonald (Clarkson)
- D: Bob Pitts (Michigan)
- D: Don Wishart (Colorado College)
- F: Bill Hay (Colorado College)
- F: Bob McCusker* (Colorado College)
- F: Tom Rendall (Michigan)

* Most Outstanding Player(s)

=== Second Team ===
- G: Ross Childs (Michigan)
- D: Dick McGhee (Colorado College)
- D: Bob Schiller (Michigan)
- F: Bob McVey (Harvard)
- F: Dick Dunnigan (Michigan)
- F: John Andrews (Colorado College)
