= Gulf Canada =

Canadian petroleum company (1969–2001)

- Industry: Petroleum
- Founded: 23 March 1944 (Canadian Gulf Oil); 1 April 1969 (Gulf Oil Canada)
- Defunct: 16 July 2001
- Fate: Acquired by Conoco
- Successor: Conoco Canada
- Headquarters: Gulf Canada Square, 401 9 Avenue SW, Calgary, Alberta
- Website: gulfcanada.ca

Gulf Canada was a Canadian integrated petroleum company that existed between 1944 and 2001. Gulf Oil Corporation began operating in Canada in 1942, and two years later formed a Canadian subsidiary called the Canadian Gulf Oil Company. In 1956 Canadian Gulf Oil merged with the British American Oil Company (of which Gulf Oil was the controlling shareholder) and until 1969 operated under the British American name. In 1969, British American amalgamated with its subsidiaries into a new company called Gulf Oil Canada Limited.

During the 1970s and 1980s, Gulf Canada was one of the country's "big four" oil companies along with Imperial, Shell Canada, and Texaco Canada. Gulf Canada remained in existence after the 1985 acquisition of Gulf Oil by Chevron. However, in 1986 Gulf Canada sold its retail operations, which included 900 gas stations, to Petro-Canada. In 2001, Conoco purchased Gulf Canada for C$6.7 billion in what was then the largest oil and gas transaction in Canadian history. The company then became Conoco Canada Resources Limited. Since Conoco's merger with the Phillips Petroleum Company in 2002, the company has been called ConocoPhillips Canada Resources Limited.

In 2015, Gulf-branded gas stations returned to Canada through a licensing deal between XTR Energy Company Limited and Gulf Oil International U.K. Limited.

== History ==
=== Early years, 1942–1956 ===
The Gulf Oil Corporation, based in Pittsburgh, began exploration in Western Canada in 1942 through a subsidiary called Gulf Research and Development. On 23 March 1944, Gulf incorporated the Canadian Gulf Oil Company as a Delaware corporation. Canadian Gulf was owned by the American International Fuel and Petroleum Company, which was a Delaware subsidiary of Gulf. Canadian Gulf Oil made several discoveries in the late 1940s and early 1950s including at Pincher Creek in 1948, Fenn-Big Valley in 1950, Westernore in 1952, and Boundary Lake in 1955. The company also made investments in several pipelines including an 8.7 per cent stake in the Interprovincial Pipe Line, 7.1 per cent stake in the Trans-Mountain Pipe Line, 10.3 per cent in the Alberta Gas Trunk Line, and 33 per cent in the Trans-Canada Pipe Line. By the end of 1955, Canadian Gulf's assets included 300 million barrels of oil reserves, three trillion cubic feet of natural gas reserves, and nine million acres of land for exploration.

=== Merged with British American, 1956–1969 ===
The British American Oil Company Limited was founded in Toronto in 1906 by Albert Leroy Ellsworth (1876–1950). Over the ensuing decades it became one of Canada's largest integrated petroleum companies. In the 1940s Gulf Oil began acquiring shares of British American, and by 1956 held the controlling interest of 25.6 per cent. In 1956, Gulf merged its Canadian subsidiary with British American in a deal the gave the illusion of the Canadian company acquiring the American. To merge the companies, British American issued 8.3 million shares (valued at $55.6 million) to the Gulf Oil Corporation, and then used the money to acquire Canadian Gulf Oil. Gulf Oil held a 59.8 per cent stake in the new merged entity. Recent changes to Canadian tax law allowed buyers to access unused tax write-offs of companies they acquired. Canadian Gulf had considerable unused write-offs, and thus British American was able to decrease its income tax by $29.7 million.

Following the merger, Gulf Oil continued to increase its stake in British American. In 1958, as part of an issuance of 2 million shares, it grew its holdings to 57.8 percent. Then in 1962 Gulf purchased another 1.8 million shares, bringing its ownership to 62.2 percent. By 1968 it owned 68.9 per cent of British American, bringing its total investment to $440 million.

In 1962, British American made a series of acquisitions of major Canadian companies. These included Royalite Oil Company Limited, the Anglo-American Exploration Company Limited, and Superior Propane Limited. In 1968 it acquired a 33 per cent interest in Shawinigan Chemicals from Gulf Oil.

=== Reformed as Gulf Oil Canada, 1969–1985 ===
At a special meeting of the shareholders held on 15 November 1968 at the Park Plaza Hotel in Toronto, shareholders voted to merge British American, Royalite, and Shawinigan into a single company called Gulf Oil Canada Limited. The new entity was officially incorporated on 1 April 1969. In 1978, the company was renamed Gulf Canada Limited.

When the Edmonton Oilers, originally named the Alberta Oilers, joined the World Hockey Association prior to the 1972-73 season they had arranged a tentative $10 million sponsorship agreement with Gulf Western, parent company of Gulf Oil. The sponsorship deal included the name Oilers and the team using the same colour scheme as Gulf Oil. The Gulf Western board chairman turned down the deal as he didn't want the company to be seen as copying Imperial Oil given Imperial's sponsorship of Hockey Night In Canada. Despite the rejection, the team chose to keep the name, logo and colour scheme.

=== Later years, 1985–2001 ===
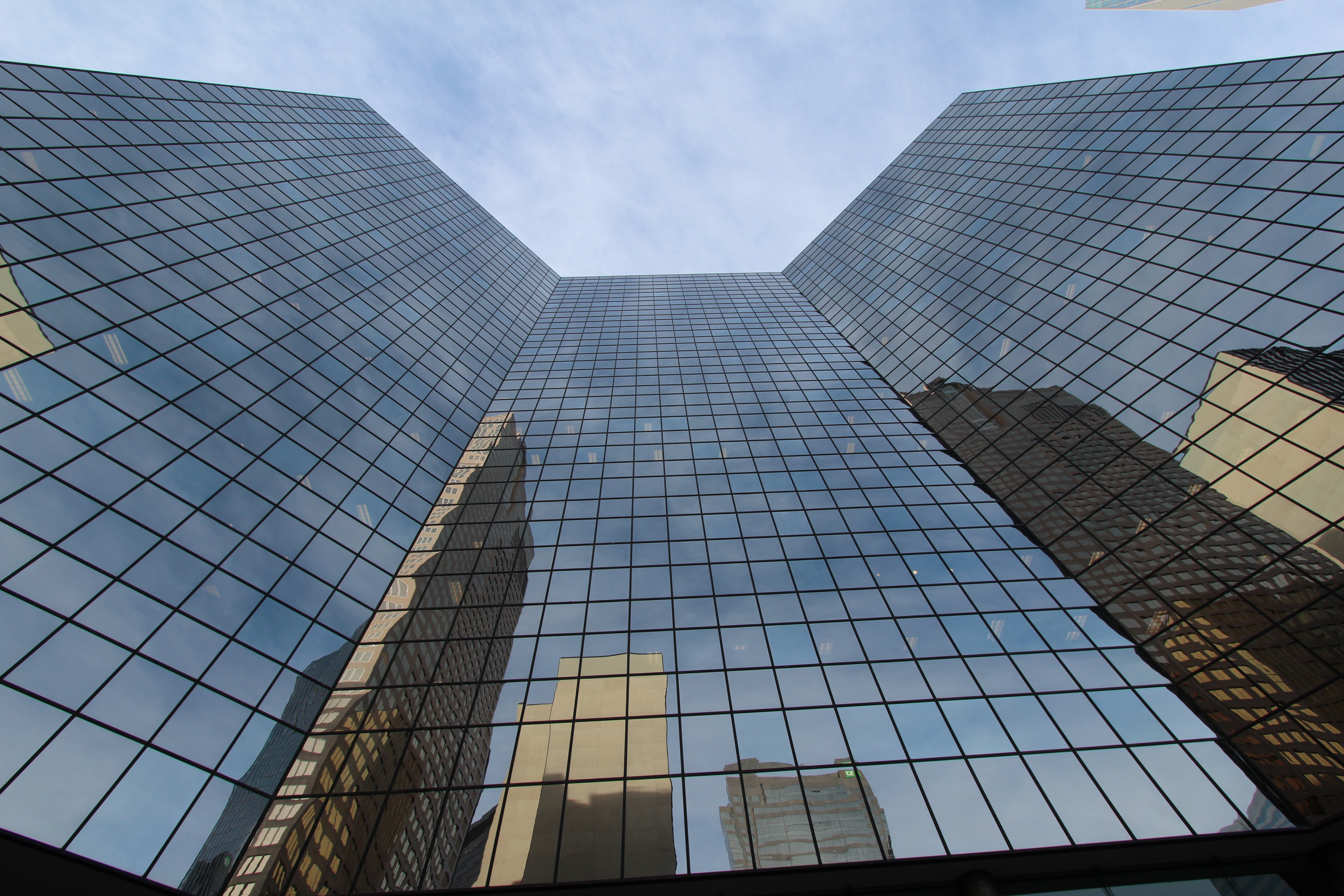
Gulf Canada Square in Calgary, the company's headquarters after 1980

In late 1985 Chevron Corporation, which had the previous year purchased Gulf Oil, Gulf Canada's parent company, announced a series of transactions for the sale of its shares in Gulf Canada. This was done in part to fulfill promises to the Canadian government as part of its approval for Chevron's purchase of Gulf Canada. In August 1985, Gulf Canada bought 90% of Abitibi-Price from the Montreal-based Reichmann family at the same time as the Reichmann's Olympia and York Developments bought 49.9% of GC from Chevron Corp. At the time, the $2.2 billion takeover was the largest corporate takeover in Canadian history. O&Y later purchased the remaining production, refining, and distribution assets through its new wholly owned subsidiary, Gulf Canada Corporation (GCC). At the time of purchase, GCC owned 2,500 service stations across Canada, was the third-largest oil producer and sixth-largest gas producer in the country, owned three Canadian refineries outright and has a half interest in a fourth, was also active in the Hibernia oil field off Newfoundland and in the Beaufort Sea in the Arctic.

On September 30, 1985, Gulf Canada sold its downstream business located west of Quebec (including its refining, transportation, and marketing assets, but excluding the Edmonton refinery) for C$900 million to Petro-Canada. On January 1, 1986, Gulf Canada sold its remaining downstream business located east of Ontario to Ultramar for C$86 million. This included the Montreal East Refinery which was closed almost immediately.

In early 1986 the corporate offices of GCC were relocated to Calgary. In July 1987, Gulf Canada Ltd. was renamed Gulf Canada Resource Ltd.

O&Y's complex purchase utilized an accounting strategy, known as the Little Egypt Bump, designed to take advantage of Canadian federal tax rules governing partnerships. The deal became publicly controversial and Leader of the Opposition John Turner alleged in Parliament that the deal cost Canadian taxpayers $1 billion in lost tax revenue. Others estimated the cost at $500 million. Allegations of conflict of interest were made against a former federal deputy minister of finance who resigned from the government to work for the Reichmann family during O&Y's purchase and tax negotiations with the government.

In March 1986, GCC launched a takeover bid for Hiram Walker Resources (HWR), a distillery company (Gooderham & Worts) with significant assets in the oil and gas industry: Home Oil Company Ltd., with major assets in North America, the North Sea, Indonesia, and Australia; Consumer's Gas Company Ltd., a major gas distribution utility; and the largest ownership stake in Interprovincial Pipeline Ltd.. In a complex battle of hostile takeover attempts, "white knight" defenses, and legal action involving GCC, HWR, Allied Lyons, Elders IXL, and TransCanada Pipelines on three continents, GCC was ultimately successful in purchasing HWR. HWR's liquor distillation business was later sold to Allied Lyons.

In 1986, GCC discovered the largest oil field then discovered in the Beaufort Sea and a few months later shut its operations there because of the high cost of operating in the harsh Arctic environment and the depressed price of oil.

In 1988, GCC purchased Asamera Inc., an oil, natural gas and gold producer, for C$512 million, or about US$413 million. Calgary, Alberta-based Asamera had interests in oil- and gas-producing properties in Indonesia; exploration properties in Canada, the North Sea, Colombia and Italy; and a 51% stake in the Cannon gold mine in Washington state.

In 1992, GCC's parent company O&Y faced collapse due to an overwhelming debt burden and was taken over by a group of creditor banks with assistance from the Canadian government. As part of the subsequent restructuring, GCC, with assets of C$6.6 billion (US$5.5 billion) was split into three companies with shares offered to existing shareholders:

- Gulf Canada Resources Ltd. (GCR), formerly GCC, was restructured into a pure oil and gas company.
- Abitibi-Price, then the world's largest newsprint maker.
- GW Utilities Ltd., whose assets included a 49% percent stake in distilling company Hiram Walker-Gooderham and Worts Ltd.; 83% of Consumers Gas Company (Canada's largest natural gas distributor); and 41% of pipeline operator Interprovincial Pipe Line Ltd. (IPL). (In 1992, IPL purchased Consumers and the combined company is now known as Enbridge).

In 1996, GCR formed the Athabasca Oil Sands Trust with an 11.74% interest in Syncrude. The trust was later merged to form Canadian Oil Sands.

The 2000 purchase of Crestar Energy Inc. substantially increased GCR's production assets, raised it to the top 5 Canadian producers and top 10 independent producers in North America, and gave it a significant stake in oil fields in eastern Ecuador.

=== Acquisition by Conoco ===
In May 2001, Gulf Canada Resources Ltd. was purchased by Conoco Northern Inc., an indirect wholly owned subsidiary of Texas-based Conoco Inc. for C$6.7 billion (US$4.33 billion). It was known as Conoco Canada Resources Limited.

=== Return of Gulf stations ===
Since 2009, Teklub Canada Ltd is the official distributor of Gulf Oil International Ltd for Gulf branded lubricants in Canada.

Gulf retail operations in Canada re-emerged beginning in 2015 with conversion of XTR Energy Company stations to the Gulf brand under a licensing agreement with Gulf Oil International UK Limited.

== Leadership ==
=== President ===
1. Charles C. Hay, 1969
2. Dr Avelette M. "Jerry" McAfee, 1969–1976
3. John L. Stoik, 1976–1985
4. S. Keith McWalter, 1985–1990
5. Charles E. Shultz, 1990–1995
6. James P. Bryan Jr, 1995–1998
7. Richard H. Auchinleck, 1998–2001

=== Chairman of the Board ===
1. Clarence D. Shepard, 1969–1979
2. John C. Phillips, 1979–1985
3. S. Keith McWalter, 1985–1990
4. Robert J. Butler, 1990–1993
5. Herbert Earl Joudrie, 1993–2001

== See also ==
- History of the petroleum industry in Canada
