= Bill Hay =

Canadian ice hockey player and executive (1935–2024)

- Hockey Hall of Fame, 2015 (Builder)
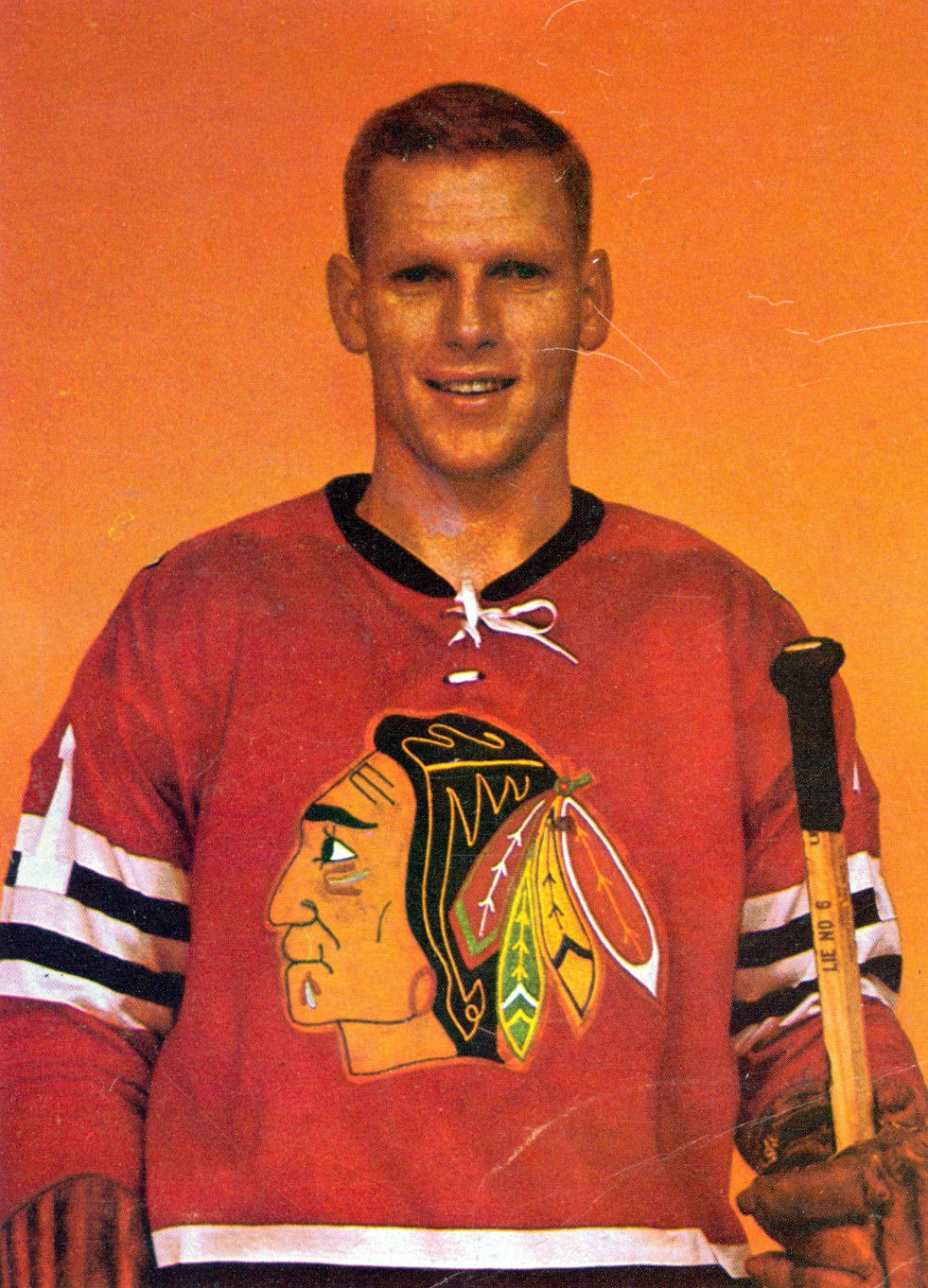
- Hay with the Chicago Black Hawks, c. 1963
- Born: December 9, 1935 Lumsden, Saskatchewan, Canada
- Died: October 25, 2024 (aged 88) Calgary, Alberta, Canada
- Height: 6 ft 3 in (191 cm)
- Weight: 190 lb (86 kg; 13 st 8 lb)
- Position: Centre
- Shot: Left
- Played for: Chicago Black Hawks
- Playing career: 1960–1967

William Charles Hay (December 9, 1935 – October 25, 2024) was a Canadian ice hockey centre who played eight seasons in the National Hockey League (NHL) for the Chicago Black Hawks. After playing, he was the CEO of the Calgary Flames. He was inducted into the builder category of the Hockey Hall of Fame in 2015 and was named to the Order of Hockey in Canada in 2021.

== Playing career ==
Hay started his junior career with the Regina Pats in the Western Canada Junior Hockey League in 1952–53 and played for the Saskatchewan Huskies of the Western Canadian Intercollegiate Athletic Association the following season. He returned to the Pats in 1954–55 when they made it to the Memorial Cup, which they lost to the Toronto Marlboros in five games.

In 1955–56, Hay began playing with the Colorado College Tigers. He was named to the WCHA First All-Star Team twice and to the NCAA First All-Star Team twice. He also earned a berth on the NCAA Championship All-Tournament Team in 1956–57.

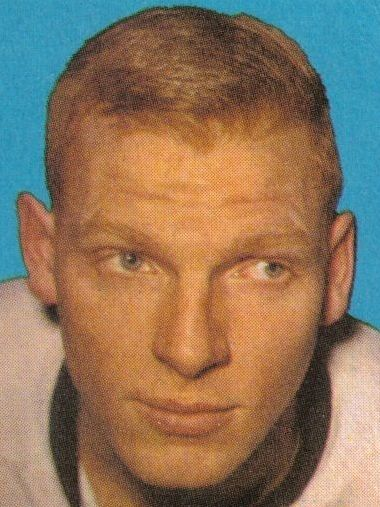
Bill Hay in 1963

Hay started his pro career in 1958–59 with the Calgary Stampeders of the Western Hockey League. In 53 games he recorded 24 goals and 30 assists. The following season he made his debut in the National Hockey League with the Chicago Black Hawks. In his rookie season he recorded 55 points and was awarded the Calder Memorial Trophy and a spot in the 1960 NHL All-Star Game. In 1960–61, Hay and his linemates Bobby Hull and Murray Balfour helped the Black Hawks win their first Stanley Cup since 1937–38. Hay continued to play for the Black Hawks until his retirement in 1967.

== Hockey executive career ==
In 1991 Hay became President and CEO of the Calgary Flames. He held the positions until being named the Chairman of the Hockey Hall of Fame in Toronto, Ontario.

== Personal life and death ==
Hay was the son of Hockey Hall of Fame member Charles Hay, and the nephew of NHL player Earl Miller.

Hay died in Calgary on October 25, 2024, at the age of 88.

== Awards and honours ==
- Selected to the NCAA Championship All-Tournament Team in 1957.
- Calder Memorial Trophy winner in 1960.
- Played in 1960 and 1961 NHL All-Star Games.
- Stanley Cup champion in 1961.
- Inducted into Hockey Hall of Fame in the Builder Category, 2015.

On February 26, 2021, Hay was named to the Order of Hockey in Canada by Hockey Canada, in recognition of his career and contributions to the game in Canada.

| Award | Year |
|---|---|
| All-WIHL First Team | 1956–57 |
| AHCA First Team All-American | 1956–57 |
| All-NCAA All-Tournament First Team | 1957 |
| All-WIHL First Team | 1957–58 |
| AHCA West All-American | 1957–58 |

== Career statistics ==
=== Regular season and playoffs ===
| | | | Regular season | | | | | Playoffs |
| Season | Team | League | GP | G | A | Pts | PIM | GP | G | A | Pts | PIM |
|---|---|---|---|---|---|---|---|---|---|---|---|---|
| 1952–53 | Regina Pats | WCJHL | 29 | 14 | 17 | 31 | 22 | 7 | 0 | 2 | 2 | 0 |
| 1953–54 | Saskatchewan Huskies | WCIAA | 5 | 4 | 1 | 5 | 4 | — | — | — | — | — |
| 1954–55 | Regina Pats | WCJHL | 33 | 16 | 31 | 47 | 68 | 14 | 8 | 2 | 10 | 6 |
| 1954–55 | Regina Pats | M-Cup | — | — | — | — | — | 15 | 12 | 11 | 23 | 12 |
| 1955–56 | Colorado College Tigers | WIHL | — | — | — | — | — | — | — | — | — | — |
| 1956–57 | Colorado College Tigers | WIHL | 30 | 28 | 45 | 73 | — | — | — | — | — | — |
| 1957–58 | Colorado College Tigers | WIHL | 30 | 32 | 48 | 80 | 23 | — | — | — | — | — |
| 1958–59 | Calgary Stampeders | WHL | 53 | 24 | 30 | 54 | 27 | 8 | 3 | 5 | 8 | 6 |
| 1959–60 | Chicago Black Hawks | NHL | 70 | 18 | 37 | 55 | 31 | 4 | 1 | 2 | 3 | 2 |
| 1960–61 | Chicago Black Hawks | NHL | 69 | 11 | 48 | 59 | 45 | 12 | 2 | 5 | 7 | 20 |
| 1961–62 | Chicago Black Hawks | NHL | 60 | 11 | 52 | 63 | 34 | 12 | 3 | 7 | 10 | 18 |
| 1962–63 | Chicago Black Hawks | NHL | 64 | 12 | 33 | 45 | 36 | 6 | 3 | 2 | 5 | 6 |
| 1963–64 | Chicago Black Hawks | NHL | 70 | 23 | 33 | 56 | 30 | 7 | 3 | 1 | 4 | 4 |
| 1964–65 | Chicago Black Hawks | NHL | 69 | 11 | 26 | 37 | 36 | 14 | 3 | 1 | 4 | 4 |
| 1965–66 | Chicago Black Hawks | NHL | 68 | 20 | 31 | 51 | 20 | 6 | 0 | 2 | 2 | 4 |
| 1966–67 | Chicago Black Hawks | NHL | 36 | 7 | 13 | 20 | 12 | 6 | 0 | 1 | 1 | 4 |
| NHL totals | | | 506 | 113 | 273 | 386 | 244 | 67 | 15 | 21 | 36 | 62 |

Awards and achievements
| Preceded by Ed Rowe | NCAA Ice Hockey Scoring Champion; 1956–57 (with Bob Cleary), 1957–58 | Succeeded by Phil Latreille |
| Preceded by Ralph Backstrom | Winner of the Calder Memorial Trophy; 1960 | Succeeded by Dave Keon |
