= Bob McCusker =

Canadian ice hockey player

- Born: January 21, 1935 (age 90); Elk Point, Alberta Canada
- Height: 6 ft 0 in (183 cm)
- Weight: 185 lb (84 kg; 13 st 3 lb)
- Position: Left wing
- Shot: Left
- Played for: Spokane Comets; Vancouver Canucks
- Playing career: 1952–1966

Robert McCusker (born January 21, 1935) is a Canadian retired professional hockey player who played 381 games in the Western Hockey League, spending time with the Spokane Comets and Vancouver Canucks.

== Awards and honours ==
Award	Year
AHCA Second Team All-American	1956–57
All-WIHL First Team	1957–58
AHCA West All-American	1957–58

Awards and achievements
Preceded by Lorne Howes	NCAA Tournament Most Outstanding Player; 1957	Succeeded by Murray Massier
