= Montreal Refinery =

Oil refinery in Quebec, Canada

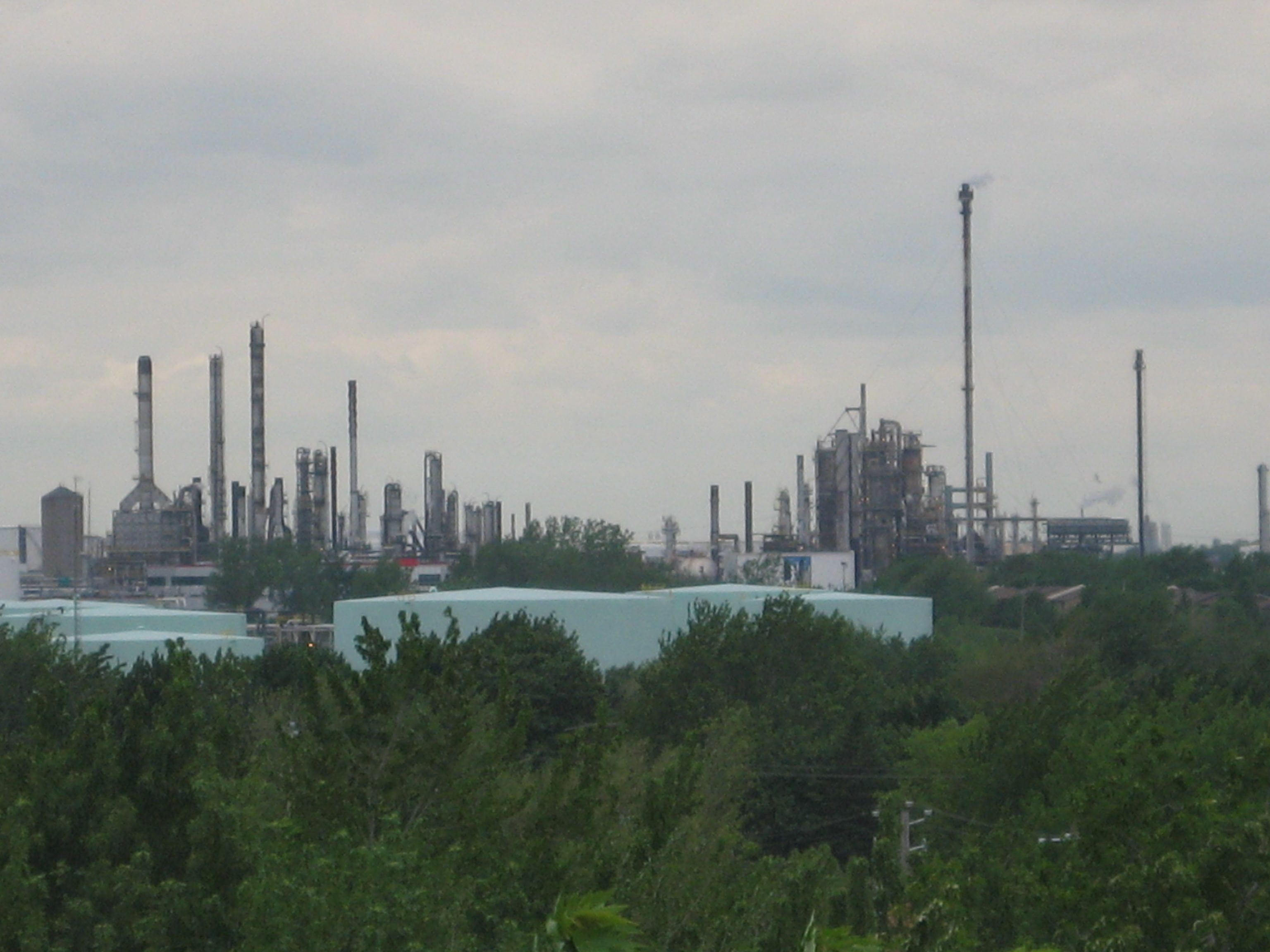
- Refinery view from the Montréal-Est city hall

- Location of the Montreal Refinery in Quebec
- Location: Montréal, Quebec, Canada; 45.6438°N 73.5224°W

Refinery details
- Operator: Suncor Energy (formerly Petro-Canada)
- Owner: Suncor Energy (formerly Petro-Canada)
- Opened: 1955
- Capacity: 137,000 barrels per day (21,800 m^{3}/d)
- Complexity index: 9.0
- No. of employees: 400 (816 FTE including contract labor)
- Refining units: alkylation, isomerisation, distillation of crude oil, hydrocracking, reforming catalytic, cracking catalytic, thermal catalytic, desulphuration, polymerization, hydrodesalkylation
- No. of oil tanks: 105
- Refining center: Montreal

The Montreal Refinery is an oil refinery located in the city of Montreal inside the Rivière-des-Prairies–Pointe-aux-Trembles borough. The refinery is not far from the Montreal East Refinery. This refinery is the largest Suncor Energy refinery. The refinery has ~400 Suncor employees but including contractors, employs 816 Full-Time-Equivalent employees.

== History ==
The Montreal refinery was originally commissioned by Petrofina on September 15, 1955, with a throughput of 20,000 bpd. Montreal had long been Canada's refining center with 8 refineries and large chemical plants in operation at its peak. Economist D. Chretien noted that "well before Calgary, Montreal was the hub of activity for oil refineries because Montreal was the principle consuming market for petroleum products in Canada." In the 1970's, expansion work was undertaken to bring capacity to 95,000 bpd. In 1981, the then Crown corporation Petro-Canada acquired the Montreal refinery as part of a government backed $1.6 billion ($1.2 billion in USD) deal to acquire all Petrofina's Canadian assets.

According to The New York Times, the government of Canada enabled its crown-corporation PetroCanada to buy the refinery as part of a converted effort to reduce foreign influence on Canadian oil. In a 1981 article, it was noted that:

The half-dozen major foreign oil companies operating in Canada now account for about three-quarters of oil and gas sales here and about the same share of ownership of oil and gas companies. A key element of the Government's energy program, announced in October, was the reduction of this ownership so that it would account for only 50 percent of sales by 1990.

The last major expansion of the refinery occurred in 2005 when Petro-Canada made the decision to close a smaller refinery operating in Oakville, Ontario and consolidate the Eastern Canada operations in Montreal. A very substantial investment in the Montreal refinery was made to expand the capacity of that facility to approximately 130,000 bpd. The plans at one point included the construction of a delayed coker (of 25,000 bpd capacity) which was never completed even though the FEED was completed. In 2009, Suncor Energy and Petro-Canada merged their operations. The new company is operated under the Suncor name for its general and trading purposes, and under the Petro-Canada trademark for its refined products and its retail and wholesale network.

== Operating units ==
Unit	Capacity Bbl/day
Atmospheric Distillation	137,000
Vacuum Distillation	54,000
FCC	32,000
Naphtha Reformer	36,000
Hydrocracker	22,000
Naphtha Hydrotreater	40,000
Kero/Jet Hydrotreater	19,500
ULSD Hydrotreater	33,000
Alkylation	4,000

The Montreal refinery is complex with both fluid cat cracking and hydrocracking units for gasoil conversion. The alkylation unit plus a high ratio of naphtha reforming relative to total crude capacity indicates that the refinery will be able to produce high octane gasoline.

The Refinery has a Nelson Complexity Index of 9.0, making it moderately complex.

The refinery shifted its crude slate to focus on domestic crude production and imports from the USA from shale crude. With the shift to a lighter domestic and US sourced crude slate, any need for a delayed coker project had become obsolete.

== Emissions ==
=== Greenhouse gas emissions ===
According to filings with the Canadian Federal Government, the oil refining sector was responsible for approximately 2.5% of the province's GhG emissions. The refinery's performance can be tracked on the Government of Canada's website for emissions. The chart below provides the GhG performance in 2022:

Gas	Sum (tonnes)	Sum (tonnes CO_{2} eq )
CO_{2}	1,126,882	1,126,882
CH_{4}	136	3,823
N_{2}O	14	3,664
HFCs	0	0
PFCs	0	0
SF_{6}	0	0
Total :		1,134,370

The 20-year history of GhG emissions statistics at the refinery are below:

Year	Emissions (tonnes CO_{2} eq)
2004	1,119,847
2005	1,232,061
2006	1,404,225
2007	1,518,397
2008	1,100,340
2009	1,267,476
2010	1,227,834
2011	1,116,796
2012	1,131,840
2013	1,170,889
2014	1,158,857
2015	1,202,095
2016	1,141,915
2017	1,217,451
2018	1,186,652
2019	1,140,280
2020	1,081,776
2021	1,141,157
2022	1,134,370

=== Future carbon plans ===
Suncor is aggressively pursuing climate change goals and Net Zero by 2050. The go-forward plan for the Montreal Refinery has year to be published for the public as of 2024. There is controversy around Suncor's future plant for GhG emissions reductions including the Montreal Refinery.

== See also ==
- List of oil facilities in Montreal
