= Charles Hay (ice hockey) =

Canadian ice hockey player and administrator

- Born: June 28, 1902
- Died: October 24, 1973 (aged 71)
- Known for: Hockey Canada executive
- Children: Bill Hay
- Awards: Hockey Hall of Fame

Charles Cecil Hay (June 28, 1902 – October 24, 1973) was a Canadian ice hockey player and administrator. A member of the Hockey Hall of Fame in the builder category, Hay is best known for his work with Hockey Canada and his efforts to organize the 1972 Summit Series. His son, Bill Hay, played for the Chicago Blackhawks.

== Career ==
Hay was born in Kingston, Ontario. In his early years, Hay played goaltender for the University of Saskatchewan Huskies and led the team to an Allan Cup final in 1921. After a long business career in the petroleum industry, he retired and began working with Hockey Canada, eventually succeeding Maxwell Bell as its president. During his time with Hockey Canada, Hay worked to develop programs for coach certification, student ice hockey scholarships, and hockey research. He also provided administrative guidance and negotiations for the Summit Series.

In the television presentation Canada Russia '72, a mini-series depicting the 1972 Summit Series, the role of Charlie Hay was played by veteran Canadian theatre director and actor Walter Learning.

== Honours and awards ==
The University of Saskatchewan presented Hay with an honorary doctorate on May 20, 1965, and he was elected to the Hockey Hall of Fame in 1974.
