= EyeGuide =

American software and hardware company

- Company type: Corporation
- Industry: Hardware and Software Development
- Founders: Dr. Brian Still and Dr. Joyce Carter
- Headquarters: Lubbock, United States
- Area served: Worldwide
- Key people: Pat Carney (CEO), Dr. Brian Still (Chairman), Greg Gamel (COO), Dr. Joyce Carter (CFO)
- Products: EyeGuide Mobile Tracker, EyeGuide Focus
- Website: www.grinbath.com

EyeGuide, Inc. is an American computer software and hardware company, located in Lubbock, Texas, United States, that currently designs and sells eye-controlled technologies for research and related markets. Previously, EyeGuide made the EyeGuide Tracker, an affordable and effective eye tracking device compatible for lab use. Following the success of the EyeGuide Tracker, the firm set out to make its tracker fully mobile: the EyeGuide Mobile Tracker.

EyeGuide or "EG" for short was developed so users can take the core EyeGuide technology and integrate it into other products such as football and military helmets, glasses, video game accessories, and medical equipment. In a first-person shooter game, for example, as the player's head moves, the avatar would move correspondingly on the screen—up, down, or side to side. As the player looks at a target, the avatar would focus in precisely on that target, resulting in faster, more natural, immersive game play. It is an intended stepping stone for augmented reality applications visualized and controlled directly via the eyes.

The company was founded in 2010 by Dr. Brian Still at Texas Tech University. EyeGuide was developed as an affordable alternative to other eye trackers for the Texas Tech University’s usability lab.

EyeGuide was selected in 2013 to be a finalist in the SXSW Interactive Accelerator Competition.
