= Colgate Raiders men's ice hockey =

Men's ice hockey college team

- Current season
- University: Colgate University
- Conference: ECAC Hockey
- First season: 1915–16
- Head coach: Mike Harder; 3rd season, 34–31–7 (.521)
- Assistant coaches: Zach Badalamenti; Anthony Walsh; Chris Nell
- Arena: Class of 1965 Arena; Hamilton, New York
- Colors: Maroon and white

NCAA tournament runner-up
- 1990

NCAA tournament Frozen Four
- 1990

NCAA tournament appearances
- 1981, 1990, 2000, 2005, 2014, 2023

Conference tournament champions
- ECAC: 1990, 2023

Conference regular season champions
- ECAC: 1990, 2004, 2006

Current uniform

The Colgate Raiders men's ice hockey team is a National Collegiate Athletic Association (NCAA) Division I college ice hockey program that represents Colgate University. The Raiders are a member of ECAC Hockey. They used to play at Starr Rink from its inauguration in 1959 until the 2015–16 season. Starting with the 2016–17 NCAA season, the Raiders have started playing their home games in the Class of 1965 Arena. The program is located in Hamilton, New York.

== History ==
=== Early years ===
Colgate's ice hockey team began as a four-game experiment in 1916 and 1917. The program was put on ice during World War I but returned in 1920 with a coach leading the Red Raiders. James Ballantine stayed with Colgate for eight years despite the program being mothballed in 1923 and remaining fallow until 1928. After ensuring the team returned he handed the coaching duties over to Ray Watkins who stayed for four uneventful seasons before assistant professor of Physical Education John Howard Starr took over. Starr spent the first four seasons toiling with losing records before both he and the team started to turn the Red Raiders' fortunes. In the late 1930s Colgate started posting lofty records of 8–1 and 9–4 and continued doing so into the early-40s. In 1942 Starr left the program to volunteer for service in World War II. The team continued on for two seasons, posting an undefeated record in 1943 of 11–0, before being suspended for the final year of the war. Once peace had been achieved Starr and the team returned. After a down season in 1946 the Red Raiders earned their second undefeated record, going 14–0 in 1946–47. The team kept up its winning ways until 1950 when Starr resigned as head coach. The new bench boss, Tom Dockrell got off to a slow start with the Red Raiders who became a founding member of the first ice hockey conference, the Tri-State League, but didn't get an opportunity to improve his record due to unseasonably warm weather that caused the program to cease operations for the next six years.

=== Indoor ice and the ECAC ===
Colgate finally returned to the ice in 1958 and continued with new head coach Olav Kollevoll for two seasons before their first indoor ice rink was finished. The building was dedicated to the former coach as the J. Howard Starr Rink at the first game played on its surface in December 1959. With the stability of the program ensured the team was able to build itself into a respectable unit, producing increasing win totals into the early 1960s and founding its second conference, ECAC Hockey along with 27 other schools. Colgate finished their first year of conference play with an 18–6 mark, setting a new school record for wins and finishing tied for 6th but it wasn't enough to earn them a selection as one of the top 8 teams in the conference so they missed the playoffs. The following year saw the team slip to 7th in the ECAC but this time they received an entry into the postseason, losing to eventual champion Harvard in the quarterfinals. The next year brought the team record up to 19 wins and a second playoff berth where they once again lost to the eventual ECAC champion in their first game, this time to Providence. After a down year in 1965 Kollevoll was replaced by Ron Ryan who held the reins for seven seasons but could only lead the team to middling results most years. After two poor showings in the early '70s the team passed through three coaches over five years, eventually landing with former St. Lawrence player Terry Slater.

=== Rise to prominence and tragedy ===
Slater's first season was an unmitigated disaster, with the team posting its worst record since tournament play began (as of 2018) but that was wiped away in his second season when the Red Raiders posted their first winning season since 1970. The following season brought Colgate its first ECAC playoff in over a decade and in 1981 Colgate notched its first 20+ win season, its first ECAC playoff win and its first appearance in the NCAA tournament. Slater would keep Colgate in good standing for the duration of the 1980s, posing winning records in all but one season, however, the Red Raiders couldn't get out of the ECAC quarterfinals in any of their succeeding appearances. All of that changed in 1989–90 when Colgate jumped out with a tremendous start and never looked back. The team won its first ECAC regular season championship by a huge margin and swept its way through the ECAC tournament to take its first conference title. The Red Raiders received the second eastern seed and a bye into the Quarterfinals where they defeated Lake Superior State in two close games. After downing Boston University in the semifinal Colgate only had Wisconsin left in their way but were unable to overcome the Badgers and had to settle for Runner-Up. Colgate predictably declined from its team-record 31 wins the next season but still posted a decent record. In December 1991 Terry Slater suffered a severe stroke and was hospitalized, dying four days later at the age of 54. His death gutted the team, but they still managed a respectable year in his absence.

=== Continued success ===
Don Vaughan arrived in 1992 to help heal the program and while the team struggled through sub-par seasons early on there were some encouraging signs with scattered postseason wins. By the mid-1990s the Red Raiders were posing winning records once more and by the end of the millennium Colgate found itself back in the NCAA tournament. Vaughan was so respected by the administration that he was tasked with serving as the interim Athletic Director for the 2003–04 school year, allowing his assistant Stan Moore to lead the team to an ECAC title and earn an ECAC Coach of the Year Award in the process. Not to be outdone, Vaughan returned to the bench the next year and got a second trip to the NCAA tournament followed by his own ECAC title the season after. Vaughan holds the school record for wins, losses and ties while having produced several NHL players along with many more professional alumni across Europe and North America.

=== The Harder Era Begins ===
After winning his first conference championship in 2023, Vaughan retired after 30 years as the Raiders' head coach. On June 2nd, 2023, Mike Harder was named head coach. Harder, Colgate's all-time leading scorer, served as an assistant coach under Vaughan from 2013-2019. Harder began with a solid foundation as most of the team's roster returned, however, he would have to find a way to replace some missing offense. Three of the Raiders' top four scorers (Alex Young, Colton Young, Matt Verboon) had departed, however, as Colgate was already one of the better offensive teams in the conference, they were well-positioned to handle that loss. In Harder's first season, 2023-2024, the Raiders finished third in the ECAC, though they had a record of 16-16-4 overall. In the ECAC tournament that season, the Raiders lost in the quarterfinals to St. Lawrence. Carter Gylander, the Raiders' standout goalie, graduated and signed with the Detroit Red Wings after the season. The following season mirrored Harder's first, as the team finished third in the ECAC and were swept in the quarterfinals, this time to rival Cornell. Harder is now in his third season. The Raiders sit in the middle of the ECAC standings, struggling to find scoring after their two leading scorers, Brett Chorske and Alex DiPaolo, left the program in 2025.

== Current roster ==
As of August 6, 2025.

No.	Nat.	Player	Class	Pos	Height	Weight	DoB	Hometown	Previous team	NHL rights
1	(United States)	Andrew Takacs	Senior	G	6' 2" (1.88 m)	190 lb (86 kg)	2001-02-27	Bowie, Maryland	New Jersey Titans (NAHL)	—
3	(Canada)	Michael Neumeier	Senior	D	6' 2" (1.88 m)	203 lb (92 kg)	2003-02-27	Kerrobert, Saskatchewan	Bismarck Bobcats (NAHL)	—
5	(United States)	Jacob Napier	Junior	D	6' 2" (1.88 m)	190 lb (86 kg)	2003-03-31	Lancaster, New York	Western Michigan (NCHC)	—
6	(United States)	Bobby Metz	Senior	D	5' 9" (1.75 m)	178 lb (81 kg)	2001-08-20	Bloomfield Hills, Michigan	Minnesota Wilderness (NAHL)	—
7	(Canada)	Simon Labelle	Senior	F	5' 10" (1.78 m)	175 lb (79 kg)	2002-09-03	Ottawa, Ontario	Prince George Spruce Kings (BCHL)	—
9	(United States)	Isaiah Norlin	Sophomore	D	6' 6" (1.98 m)	205 lb (93 kg)	2003-04-21	Minneapolis, Minnesota	Omaha (NCHC)	—
10	(Italy)	Simone Dadiè	Sophomore	F	6' 2" (1.88 m)	205 lb (93 kg)	2003-02-27	Brunico, Italy	Powell River Kings (BCHL)	—
11	(United States)	Antonio Fernandez	Junior	D	5' 8" (1.73 m)	179 lb (81 kg)	2003-10-11	San Jose, California	Colorado College (NCHC)	—
12	(Canada)	Daniel Panetta	Senior	F	5' 10" (1.78 m)	175 lb (79 kg)	2001-05-20	Belleville, Ontario	Salmon Arm Silverbacks (BCHL)	—
13	(United States)	Max Nagel	Sophomore	F	5' 8" (1.73 m)	161 lb (73 kg)	2004-06-30	West St. Paul, Minnesota	Madison Capitols (USHL)	—
14	(United States)	Jack Brandt	Sophomore	F	5' 10" (1.78 m)	170 lb (77 kg)	2004-06-14	Columbus, Ohio	Madison Capitols (USHL)	—
16	(Canada)	Ryan Sullivan	Junior	F	6' 2" (1.88 m)	190 lb (86 kg)	2002-05-15	Calgary, Alberta	Camrose Kodiaks (AJHL)	—
19	(United States)	Ryan Spinale	Sophomore	F	6' 6" (1.98 m)	216 lb (98 kg)	2004-02-09	Plymouth, Massachusetts	Lincoln Stars (USHL)	—
20	(Canada)	Easton Wainwright	Freshman	F	5' 10" (1.78 m)	190 lb (86 kg)	2005-01-19	Mount Hope, Ontario	Sarnia Sting (OHL)	—
21	(United States)	Niko Rexine	Junior	F	6' 2" (1.88 m)	195 lb (88 kg)	2002-06-20	Syracuse, New York	Muskegon Lumberjacks (USHL)	—
22	(United States)	Robby Newton	Senior	F	5' 9" (1.75 m)	190 lb (86 kg)	2001-07-16	Milwaukee, Wisconsin	Wisconsin (Big Ten)	—
23	(United States)	Owen Neuharth	Senior	F	5' 11" (1.8 m)	177 lb (80 kg)	2001-10-25	Savage, Minnesota	Fairbanks Ice Dogs (NAHL)	—
24	(United States)	Jake Schneider	Junior	F	5' 11" (1.8 m)	198 lb (90 kg)	2002-12-24	Plymouth, Minnesota	Prince George Spruce Kings (BCHL)	—
25	(Canada)	Tyson Doucette	Freshman	F	6' 0" (1.83 m)	181 lb (82 kg)	2004-01-30	Sault Ste. Marie, Ontario	Sarnia Sting (OHL)	—
26	(United States)	Joshua Niedermayer	Sophomore	D	6' 0" (1.83 m)	200 lb (91 kg)	2004-02-20	Newport Beach, California	Dubuque Fighting Saints (USHL)	—
27	(Canada)	Brett Merner	Sophomore	D	6' 1" (1.85 m)	181 lb (82 kg)	2004-01-11	Nanaimo, British Columbia	Nanaimo Clippers (USHL)	—
28	(United States)	Luke Malboeuf	Freshman	D	6' 0" (1.83 m)	190 lb (86 kg)	2005-01-07	Monroeville, Pennsylvania	Dubuque Fighting Saints (USHL)	—
29	(United States)	Davide Patella	Freshman	F	6' 2" (1.88 m)	194 lb (88 kg)	2004-01-06	Laval, Quebec	Brooks Bandits (BCHL)	—
30	(United States)	Nick Haas	Senior	G	6' 4" (1.93 m)	195 lb (88 kg)	2001-11-11	Buffalo, New York	Chippewa Steel (NAHL)	—
35	(United States)	Jack Olson	Sophomore	G	6' 1" (1.85 m)	174 lb (79 kg)	2003-03-28	St. Louis Park, Minnesota	Boston Jr. Bruins (NCDC)	—
37	(Canada)	Reid Dyck	Freshman	G	6' 4" (1.93 m)	196 lb (89 kg)	2004-01-20	Winkler, Manitoba	Swift Current Broncos (WHL)	BOS, 183rd overall 2022

=== Team photo ===
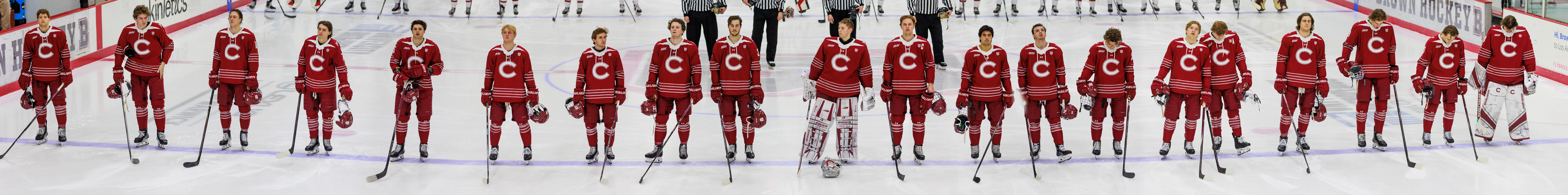
Lineup of 2024-25 Raiders

== Season-by-season results ==
Source:

== Coaching history ==
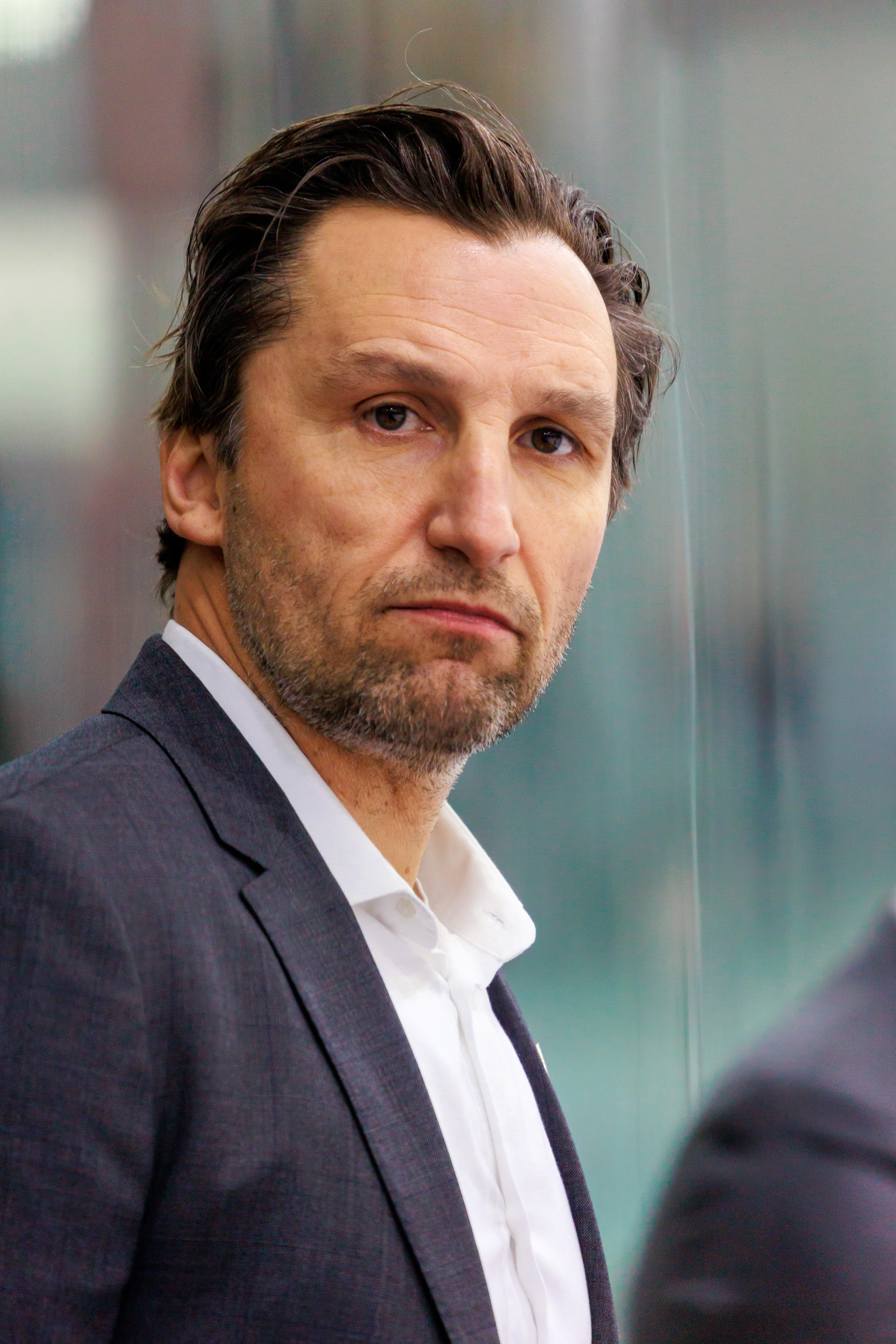
Mike Harder

As of the completion of 2024–25 season

Tenure	Coach	Years	Record	Pct.
1915–1917	No Coach	2	3–1–0	.750
1920–1922, 1927–28	James Ballantine	3	2–11–0	.154
1928–1932	Ray Watkins	4	6–11–1	.361
1932–1942, 1945–1950	J. Howard Starr	15	87–74–4	.539
1942–1943	Gregory Batt	1	11–0–0	1.000
1943–1944	Albert Prettyman	1	4–2–0	.667
1950–1951	Tom Dockrell	1	2–7–0	.222
1957–1965	Olav Kollevoll	8	81–66–2	.550
1965–1972	Ron Ryan	7	78–92–4	.460
1972–1975	Brad Houston	3	32–47–1	.406
1975–1977	Jim Higgins	2	21–32–0	.396
1977–1991	Terry Slater	15†	251–180–23	.578
1991–1992	Brian Durocher	1†	12–10–0	.545
2003–2004	Stan Moore	1	22–12–5	.628
1992–2003, 2004–2023	Don Vaughan	30	472–514–123	.481
2023–Present	Mike Harder	2	34–31–7	.521
Totals	15 coaches	95 seasons	1118–1080–170	.508

† Terry Slater Died on December 6, 1991.

== Awards and honors ==
=== NCAA ===
==== Individual ====
Spencer Penrose Award

- Terry Slater: 1990

==== All-Americans ====
AHCA First Team All-Americans

- 1969–70: Tommy Earl, F
- 1981–82: Chris Renaud, D
- 1983–84: Steve Smith, F
- 1987–88: Réjean Boivin, F
- 1989–90: Dave Gagnon, G
- 1999–00: Andy McDonald, F
- 2008–09: David McIntyre, F
- 2011–12: Austin Smith, F

AHCA Second Team All-Americans

- 1984–85: Jeff Cooper, G
- 1989–90: Joel Gardner, F
- 1991–92: Dale Band, F
- 1995–96: Brad Dexter, D
- 1996–97: Mike Harder, F
- 2017–18: Colton Point, G

=== ECAC Hockey ===
==== Individual ====
Player of the Year

- Dave Gagnon, G: 1989–90
- Andy McDonald, C: 1999–00
- Austin Smith, RW: 2011–12

Tim Taylor Award

- Terry Slater: 1989–90
- Don Vaughan: 1999–00, 2013–14
- Stan Moore: 2003–04

Best Defensive Forward

- Jon Smyth: 2003–04

Best Defensive Defenseman

- Pierson Brandon: 2020–21

Ken Dryden Award

- Mark DeKanich: 2005–06

Student-Athlete of the Year

- Matt Verboon: 2022–23

Tournament MOP

- Craig Woodcroft: 1990
- Carter Gylander: 2023

==== All-Conference ====
First Team All-ECAC Hockey

- 1969–70: Tommy Earl, F
- 1981–82: Chris Renaud, D
- 1983–84: Steve Smith, F
- 1984–85: Jeff Cooper, G
- 1987–88: Réjean Boivin, F
- 1988–89: Scott Young, D
- 1989–90: Dave Gagnon, G; Joel Gardner, F
- 1991–92: Dale Band, F
- 1995–96: Brad Dexter, D
- 1996–97: Mike Harder, F
- 1999–00: Cory Murphy, D; Andy McDonald, F
- 2003–04: Jon Smyth, F
- 2005–06: Mark Dekanich, G; Tyler Burton, F
- 2008–09: David McIntyre, F
- 2011–12: Austin Smith, F
- 2020–21: Josh McKechney, F
- 2022–23: Alex Young, F

Second Team All-ECAC Hockey

- 1962–63: Steve Riggs, F
- 1963–64: Steve Riggs, F
- 1980–81: Chris Renaud, D; Dan Fridgen, F
- 1985–86: Gerard Waslen, F
- 1986–87: Wayne Crowley, G
- 1988–89: Paul Cohen, G
- 1993–94: Bruce Gardiner, F
- 1994–95: Brad Dexter, D; Mike Harder, F
- 1995–96: Dan Brenzavich, G; Mike Harder, F; Chris DeProfio, F
- 1998–99: Andy McDonald, D
- 2000–01: Cory Murphy, D; Sean Nolan, F
- 2002–03: Scooter Smith, G
- 2003–04: Rob Brown, D
- 2005–06: Kyle Wilson, F
- 2006–07: Mark Dekanich, G; Tyler Burton, F; Jesse Winchester, F
- 2007–08: Tyler Burton, F
- 2009–10: David McIntyre, F
- 2011–12: Chris Wagner, F
- 2017–18: Colton Point, G
- 2023–24: Tommy Bergsland, D

Third Team All-ECAC Hockey

- 2007–08: Mark Dekanich, G; Jesse Winchester, F
- 2011–12: Thomas Larkin, D
- 2013–14: Charlie Finn, G; Spiro Goulakos, D
- 2014–15: Tyson Spink, F; Kyle Baun, F
- 2015–16: Tyson Spink, F
- 2016–17: Jake Kulevich, D
- 2018–19: Bobby McMann, F

ECAC Hockey All-Rookie Team

- 1987–88: Steve Poapst, D
- 1988–89: Dale Band, F; Jamie Cooke, F
- 1989–90: Bob Haddock, D
- 1991–92: Brad Dexter, D; Ron Fogarty, F
- 1993–94: Mike Harder, F
- 1994–95: Dan Brenzavich, G; Tim Loftsgard, F
- 1997–98: Cory Murphy, D
- 2000–01: Rob Brown, D
- 2003–04: Mike Campaner, D
- 2004–05: Tyler Burton, F
- 2005–06: Nick St. Pierre, D
- 2012–13: Kyle Baun, F; Tylor Spink, F
- 2013–14: Charlie Finn, G
- 2017–18: Nick Austin, D
- 2020–21: Pierson Brandon, D; Alex Young, F
- 2023–24: Jake Schneider, F

== Statistical leaders ==
=== Career points leaders ===
Player	Years	GP	G	A	Pts	PIM
Mike Harder	1994–97	134	88	126	214	78
Steve Smith	1980–84	126	83	129	212	36
Gerard Waslen	1982–86	123	100	101	201	217
Dan Fridgen	1978–82	113	114	78	192	387
Denis Lapensee	1978–82	111	69	122	191	106
Jim Wallace	1980–84	127	77	111	188	46
Joel Gardner	1986–90	130	71	113	184	144
Réjean Boivin	1984–88	128	86	87	173	60
Dale Band	1988–92	128	50	119	169	86
Craig Woodcroft	1987–91	127	73	95	168	250
John Barnett	1972–76		75	93	168	

=== Career goaltending leaders ===
GP = Games played; Min = Minutes played; GA = Goals against; SO = Shutouts; SV% = Save percentage; GAA = Goals against average

Minimum 30 games

Player	Years	GP	Min	W	L	T	GA	SO	SV%	GAA
Colton Point	2016–2018	43	2586	18	17	7	82	6	.938	1.90
Steve Silverthorn	2001–2005	100	5744	55	30	9	213	8	.914	2.22
Mark Dekanich	2004–2008	118	6812	52	45	16	255	11	.923	2.25
Mitch Benson	2018–2022	71	4168	24	35	12	172	2	.918	2.48
Charlie Finn	2013–2017	126	7306	54	57	13	321	8	.911	2.64
Carter Gylander	2021–2024	106	6309	46	46	13	283	5	.907	2.69

Statistics current through the start of the 2024-25 season.

=== Olympians ===
This is a list of Colgate alumni were a part of an Olympic team.

Name	Position	Colgate Tenure	Team	Year	Finish
Dick McGlynn	Defenseman	1966–1970	(United States) USA	1972	Silver
Thomas Larkin	Defenseman	2009–2013	(Italy) ITA	2026	12th

== Players ==
=== Raiders in the NHL ===
As of July 1, 2025.

= NHL All-Star team	= NHL All-Star	= NHL All-Star and NHL All-Star team

Player	Position	Team(s)	Years	Games	Stanley Cups
Kyle Baun	Forward	CHI	2014–2016	5	0
Wayne Cowley	Goaltender	EDM	1993–1994	1	0
Mark Dekanich	Goaltender	NSH	2010–2011	1	0
Dan Fridgen	Forward	HFD	1981–1983	11	0
Dave Gagnon	Center	DET	1990–1991	2	0
Bruce Gardiner	Center	OTT, TBL, CBJ, NJD	1996–2002	312	0
Ryan Johnston	Defense	MTL	2015–2017	10	0
Bill McCreary Jr.	Left wing	TOR	1980–1981	12	0
Andy McDonald	Center	ANA, STL	2000–2013	685	1
David McIntyre	Center	MIN	2011–2012	7	0

Player	Position	Team(s)	Years	Games	Stanley Cups
Bobby McMann	Center	TOR	2022–Present	140	0
Mike Milbury	Defenseman	BOS	1973–1987	754	0
Joey Mormina	Defenseman	CAR	2007–2008	1	0
Cory Murphy	Defenseman	FLA, TBL, NJD	2007–2010	91	0
Steve Poapst	Defenseman	WSH, CHI, PIT, STL	1995–2006	307	0
David Sloane	Right wing	PHI	2008–2009	1	0
Chris Wagner	Center	ANA, COL, NYI, BOS, COL	2014–Present	401	0
Mike Walsh	Center	NYI	1987–1989	14	0
Kyle Wilson	Center	WSH, CBJ, NSH	2009–2012	39	0
Jesse Winchester	Center	OTT, FLA	2007–2014	285	0

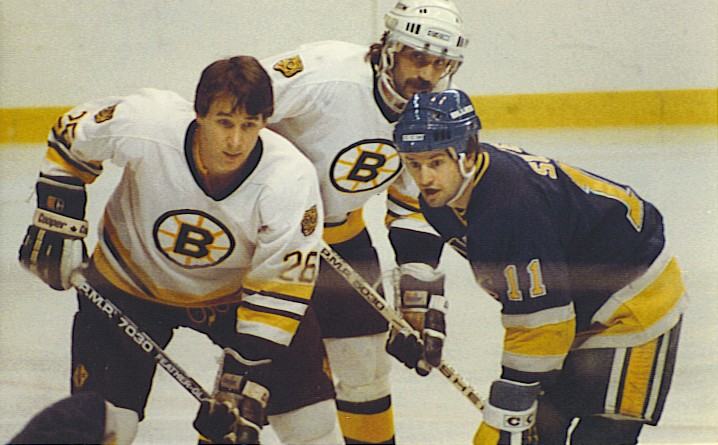
Mike Milbury

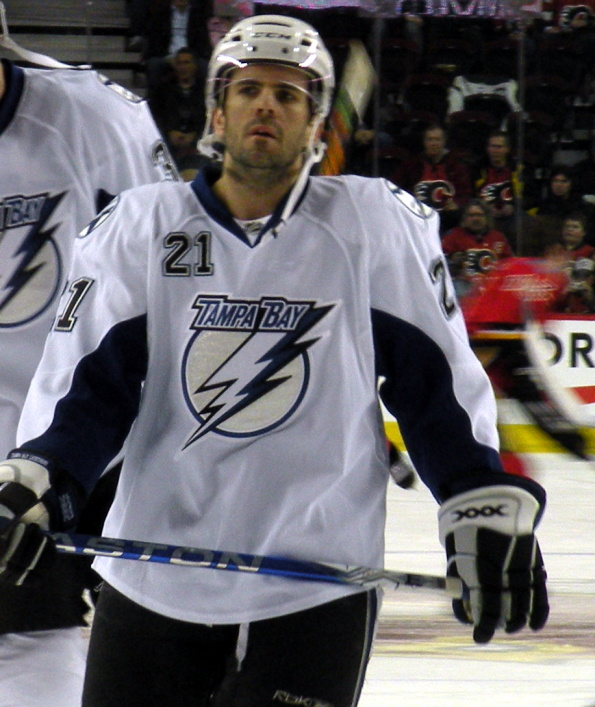
Cory Murphy

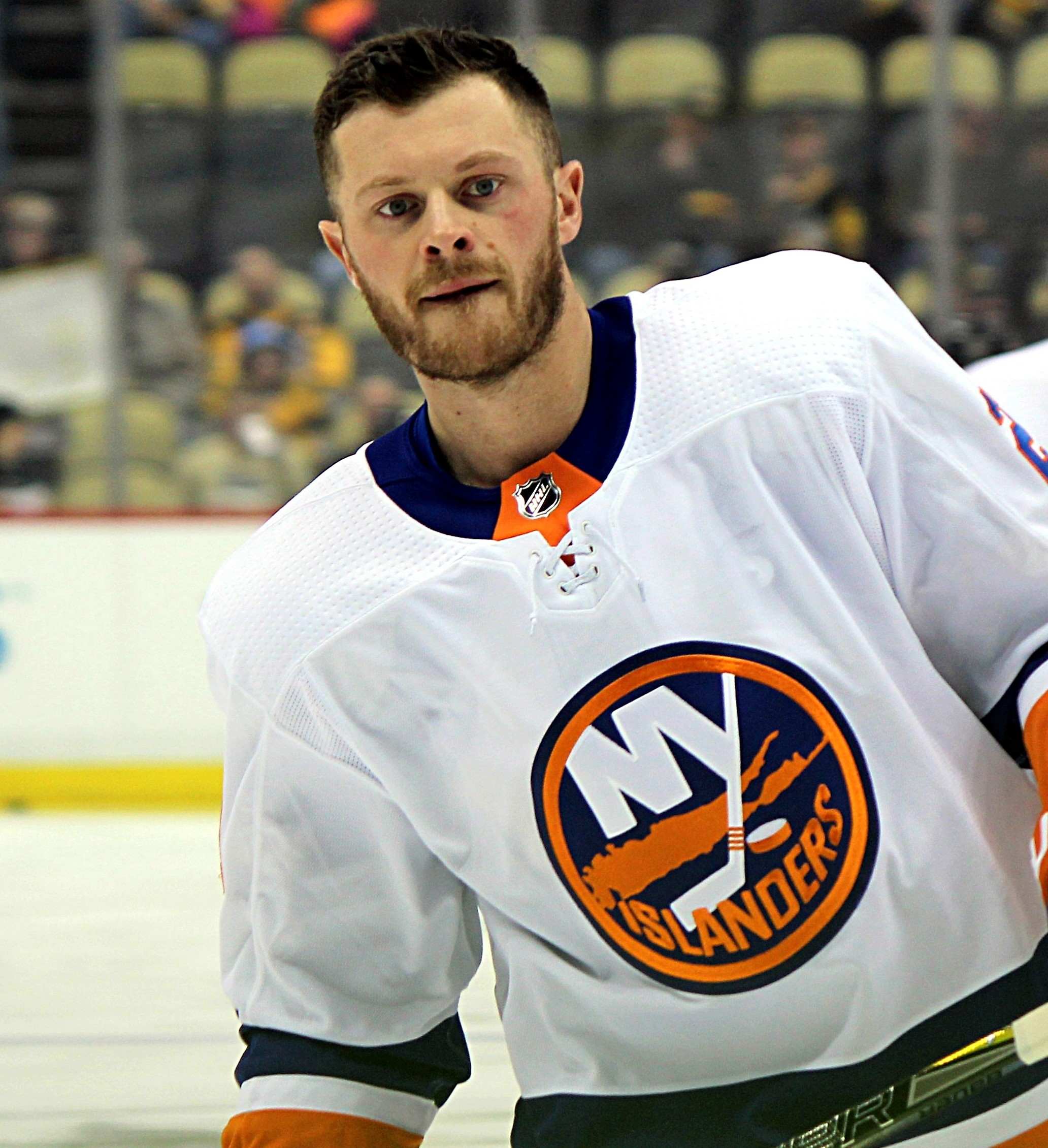
Chris Wagner

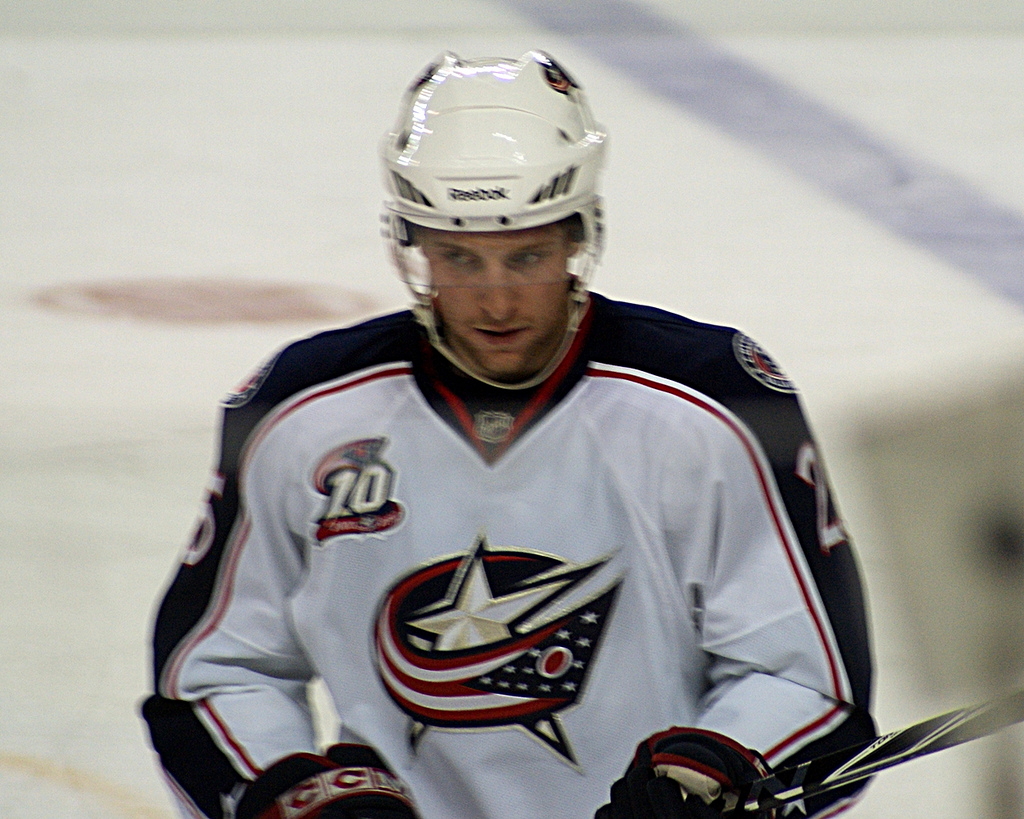
Kyle Wilson

=== WHA ===
Two players were members of WHA teams.

Player	Position	Team(s)	Years	Avco Cups
Bill Davis	Defenseman	WPG	1977–1979	2
Tommy Earl	Center	NEW	1972–1977	1
Chris Grigg	Goaltender	OTC	1975–1976	0

== See also ==
- Colgate Raiders women's ice hockey
- Colgate Raiders
