= Chris Renaud (disambiguation) =

Chris Renaud may refer to:

- Chris Renaud (ice hockey) (born 1960), Canadian ice hockey defenceman
- Chris Renaud (animator) (born 1966), American illustrator and film-maker
- Chris Renaud (swimmer) (born 1976), Canadian backstroke swimmer
