= Tommy Earl =

Canadian ice hockey player

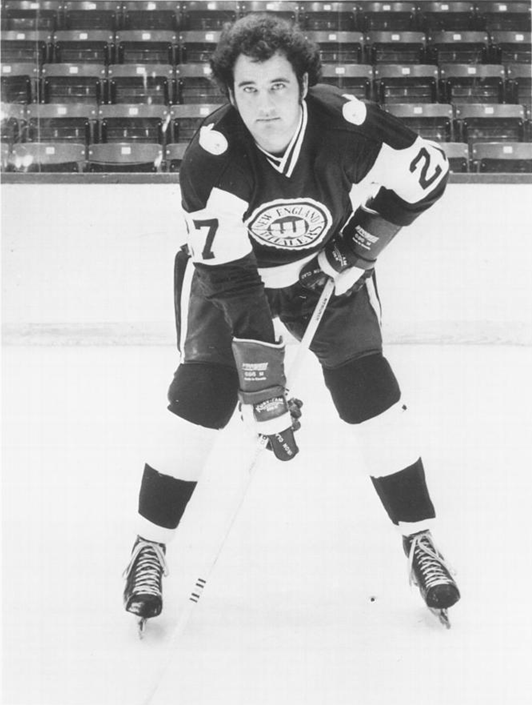
- Born: June 10, 1946 (age 80) Niagara Falls, Ontario, Canada
- Height: 5 ft 10 in (178 cm)
- Weight: 161 lb (73 kg; 11 st 7 lb)
- Position: Right wing/Center
- Played for: Niagara Falls Flyers; Colgate; Kansas City Blues; New England Whalers; Rhode Island Reds
- NHL draft: Undrafted
- Playing career: 1967–1977

W. Thomas Earl is a Canadian retired professional ice hockey player who played 347 games in the World Hockey Association.

== Career ==
Earl debuted for the varsity team at Colgate University in 1967 and swiftly became the team's star. His time with the Red Raiders coincided with the team being a middling squad, preventing him from achieving any postseason success, however, Earl was able to shine during his time in Hamilton. As a junior, he shattered the program record with 37 goals during the season, accounting for nearly a third of the team's total all season. He was named team captain for hit senior season and repeated his goal production while adding an additional 5 assists to finish with 62 points, another program record. When Earl was finished with his college career he held nearly all goal-scoring records for Colgate. In the years since almost all have been surpassed but he continues to hold the school record for game-winning goals with 18 overall and 10 in 1970 (as of 2020).

Earl continued playing for the Kansas City Blues immediately after Colgate's season ended in 1970. He shifted from Wing to Center and played a more defensive-oriented game as a profession. The change paid off, however, and when the WHA was formed Earl became an inaugural member of the New England Whalers. Earl helped New England win the Avco Cup in 1973 and remained with the club until 1977. He finished his career after a short stint with the Rhode Island Reds.

== Awards and honors ==
Award	Year
All-ECAC Hockey First Team	1969–70
AHCA East All-American	1969–70

== Career statistics ==
=== Regular season and playoffs ===
			Regular season					Playoffs
Season	Team	League	GP	G	A	Pts	PIM	GP	G	A	Pts	PIM
1965–66	Niagara Falls Flyers	OHA	2	1	0	1	0	—	—	—	—	—
1967–68	Colgate University	ECAC	Statistics Unavailable
1968–69	Colgate University	ECAC	——	37	20	57	0	—	—	—	—	—
1969–70	Colgate University	ECAC	——	37	25	62	0	—	—	—	—	—
1969–70	Kansas City Blues	CHL	5	2	5	7	0	—	—	—	—	—
1970–71	Kansas City Blues	CHL	64	19	25	44	33	—	—	—	—	—
1971–72	Kansas City Blues	CHL	64	15	18	33	23	—	—	—	—	—
1972–73	New England Whalers	WHA	77	10	13	23	4	15	2	3	5	10
1973–74	New England Whalers	WHA	78	10	10	20	29	7	0	2	2	2
1974–75	New England Whalers	WHA	72	3	8	11	20	6	1	1	2	12
1975–76	New England Whalers	WHA	66	8	11	19	26	17	0	5	5	4
1976–77	New England Whalers	WHA	54	9	14	23	37	1	0	0	0	0
1976–77	Rhode Island Reds	AHL	8	3	5	8	4	—	—	—	—	—
WHA totals			347	40	56	96	116	46	3	11	14	28
