= Steve Patrick =

Canadian ice hockey player (born 1961)

- Born: February 4, 1961 (age 65) Winnipeg, Manitoba, Canada
- Height: 6 ft 4 in (193 cm)
- Weight: 206 lb (93 kg; 14 st 10 lb)
- Position: Right wing
- Shot: Right
- Played for: Buffalo Sabres; New York Rangers; Quebec Nordiques
- National team: Canada
- NHL draft: 20th overall, 1980; Buffalo Sabres
- Playing career: 1980–1986

Stephen Gary Patrick (born February 4, 1961) is a Canadian former professional ice hockey player. He was drafted in the first round, 20th overall, by the Buffalo Sabres in the 1980 NHL entry draft. Patrick played 250 games in the National Hockey League (NHL) with the Sabres, New York Rangers, and Quebec Nordiques between 1980 and 1986.

On December 6, 1984, the Sabres traded Patrick and Jim Wiemer to the New York Rangers in exchange for Chris Renaud and Dave Maloney.

His brother, James Patrick, also played hockey and later coached at the junior level. Patrick's father Stephen Patrick played football for the Winnipeg Blue Bombers, and served in the Legislative Assembly of Manitoba. Patrick's son Nolan was drafted second overall in the 2017 NHL entry draft by the Philadelphia Flyers, and last played for the Vegas Golden Knights during the 2021-22 NHL season.

== Career statistics ==
=== Regular season and playoffs ===
			Regular season					Playoffs
Season	Team	League	GP	G	A	Pts	PIM	GP	G	A	Pts	PIM
1976–77	St. James Canadians	MJHL	50	12	23	35	88	—	—	—	—	—
1977–78	St. James Canadians	MJHL	49	41	41	82	176	—	—	—	—	—
1978–79	Brandon Wheat Kings	WHL	52	23	31	54	105	22	6	12	18	44
1978–79	Brandon Wheat Kings	M-Cup	—	—	—	—	—	5	1	1	2	6
1979–80	Brandon Wheat Kings	WHL	71	28	38	66	185	11	6	6	12	19
1980–81	Brandon Wheat Kings	WHL	34	29	30	59	56	—	—	—	—	—
1980–81	Buffalo Sabres	NHL	30	1	7	8	25	5	0	1	1	6
1981–82	Buffalo Sabres	NHL	41	8	8	16	64	—	—	—	—	—
1981–82	Rochester Americans	AHL	38	11	9	20	15	5	3	2	5	12
1982–83	Buffalo Sabres	NHL	56	9	13	22	26	2	0	0	0	0
1983–84	Buffalo Sabres	NHL	11	1	4	5	6	1	0	0	0	0
1983–84	Rochester Americans	AHL	30	8	14	22	33	13	2	1	3	18
1984–85	Buffalo Sabres	NHL	14	2	2	4	4	—	—	—	—	—
1984–85	New York Rangers	NHL	43	11	18	29	63	1	0	0	0	0
1985–86	New York Rangers	NHL	28	4	3	7	37	—	—	—	—	—
1985–86	Quebec Nordiques	NHL	27	4	13	17	17	3	0	0	0	6
NHL totals			250	40	68	108	242	12	0	1	1	12

== Awards and achievements ==
- Ed Chynoweth Cup (WHL) Championship (1979)
- Honoured Member of the Manitoba Hockey Hall of Fame

== See also ==
- List of family relations in the NHL

Preceded by Mike Ramsey	Buffalo Sabres first-round draft pick 1980	Succeeded by Jiří Dudáček
