= Brad Dexter (ice hockey) =

Canadian ice hockey player

- Born: March 29, 1972 (age 54) Brockville, Ontario, Canada
- Height: 5 ft 10 in (178 cm)
- Weight: 180 lb (82 kg; 12 st 12 lb)
- Position: Defence
- Shot: Right
- Played for: AHL; Syracuse Crunch; Den. Herning Blue Fox; ECHL; Pensacola Ice Pilots; Raleigh IceCaps; South Carolina Stingrays; Victoria Salmon Kings; IHL; Kansas City Blades
- Playing career: 1996–2005
- Coaching career

Current position
- Title: Assistant coach
- Team: Princeton
- Conference: ECAC Hockey

Biographical details
- Education: Colgate

Coaching career (HC unless noted)
- 2001–2002: Clarkson (assistant)
- 2005–2014: Colgate (assistant)
- 2014–Present: Princeton (assistant)

Brad Dexter (born March 29, 1972) is a Canadian retired professional ice hockey defenceman who has served as an assistant coach with the Colgate Raiders of the ECAC Hockey conference in the NCAA since 2005.

Dexter was a four-year letterwinner in hockey at Colgate. He was named to the All-America second team and all-ECAC Hockey first team as a senior in 1996. As a junior, he earned second-team all-ECAC honors and was named to the league's all-rookie team his first season.

As a senior at Colgate, Dexter registered 32 points, which is tied for seventh on the school¹s single-season scoring by defensemen list. He was named to the All-America second team and all-ECAC first team in 1996. He earned second-team all-ECAC honors as a junior, and was named to the league¹s all-rookie team his first season.

Dexter is tied for 70th on Colgate's all-time career scoring list with 20 goals and 65 assists for 85 points in 108 games. Among Raider defensemen, Dexter ranks sixth all-time in assists, eighth in points, and is tied for 10th in goals.

== Career statistics ==
			Regular season					Playoffs
Season	Team	League	GP	G	A	Pts	PIM	GP	G	A	Pts	PIM
1991–92	Colgate University	ECAC	30	1	18	19	38	—	—	—	—	—
1992–93	Colgate University	ECAC	12	2	2	4	10	—	—	—	—	—
1994–95	Colgate University	ECAC	31	7	23	30	36	—	—	—	—	—
1995–96	Colgate University	ECAC	34	10	21	31	28	—	—	—	—	—
1996–97	Raleigh Icecaps	ECHL	52	8	32	40	20	—	—	—	—	—
1996–97	South Carolina Stingrays	ECHL	16	0	17	17	12	18	3	23	26	8
1997–98	South Carolina Stingrays	ECHL	70	11	38	49	54	5	2	4	6	0
1998–99	South Carolina Stingrays	ECHL	70	19	36	55	46	3	1	1	2	2
1999–2000	Kansas City Blades	IHL	3	0	0	0	2	—	—	—	—	—
1999–2000	South Carolina Stingrays	ECHL	63	7	59	66	44	10	1	7	8	2
1999–2000	Syracuse Crunch	AHL	5	0	0	0	0	—	—	—	—	—
2000–01	South Carolina Stingrays	ECHL	72	7	40	47	46	18	3	8	11	10
2002–03	Pensacola Ice Pilots	ECHL	72	8	44	52	54	4	1	1	2	2
2003–04	Herning IK	DEN	36	9	8	17	34	—	—	—	—	—
2004–05	Victoria Salmon Kings	ECHL	49	7	28	35	36	—	—	—	—	—
ECHL totals			464	67	294	361	312	58	11	44	55	24

== Awards and honours ==
Award	Year
All-ECAC Hockey Rookie Team	1991–92
All-ECAC Hockey Second Team	1994–95
All-ECAC Hockey First Team	1995–96
AHCA East Second-Team All-American	1995–96

Sporting positions
Preceded by new creation	Victoria Salmon Kings team captain 2004–2005	Succeeded by Ryan Wade
