= Dave Maloney =

Canadian ice hockey player (born 1956)

- Born: July 31, 1956 (age 70) Kitchener, Ontario, Canada
- Height: 6 ft 1 in (185 cm)
- Weight: 195 lb (88 kg; 13 st 13 lb)
- Position: Defence
- Shot: Left
- Played for: New York Rangers; Buffalo Sabres
- NHL draft: 14th overall, 1974; New York Rangers
- Playing career: 1974–1985

David Wilfred Maloney (born July 31, 1956) is a Canadian former professional ice hockey defenceman who played eleven seasons in the National Hockey League (NHL) from 1974–75 until 1984–85.

== Playing career ==
Maloney was the 14th overall selection in the first round of the 1974 NHL Amateur Draft by the New York Rangers. He played 657 career NHL games, scoring 71 goals and 246 assists for 317 points, as well as compiling 1154 penalty minutes. He was also the youngest player to serve as Captain for the New York Rangers and captained them to the 1979 Stanley Cup Final. That same year, Maloney, along with Phil Esposito and other Ranger teammates, recorded a song called the Hockey Sock Rock as a fundraiser for the Juvenile Diabetes Research Foundation.

On December 6, 1984, the Rangers traded Maloney and Chris Renaud to the Buffalo Sabres in exchange for Steve Patrick and Jim Wiemer.

Maloney played with his brother Don Maloney while with the Rangers, who was selected 26th overall in the 1978 Amateur Draft. Dave had been a summer instructor at the Orr-Walton Sports Camp when brother Don was drafted.

== Post-playing career ==
In 1990, he called the New York Rangers-Washington series on SportsChannel America along with Rick Peckham. From 1995 to 1998, he was a studio analyst for NHL on Fox. He currently serves as the color commentator on Rangers television broadcasts alongside Kenny Albert and Alex Faust. He currently resides in Greenwich, Connecticut.

In the 2009 book 100 Ranger Greats, the authors ranked Maloney at No. 34 all-time of the 901 New York Rangers who had played during the team's first 82 seasons.

== Career statistics ==
			Regular season					Playoffs
Season	Team	League	GP	G	A	Pts	PIM	GP	G	A	Pts	PIM
1971–72	St. Michael's Buzzers	MetJHL	—	—	—	—	—	—	—	—	—	—
1971–72	Kitchener Rangers	OHA-Jr.	1	0	0	0	0	2	0	0	0	2
1972–73	Kitchener Rangers	OHA-Jr.	49	8	21	29	101	—	—	—	—	—
1973–74	Kitchener Rangers	OHA-Jr.	69	15	53	68	109	—	—	—	—	—
1974–75	Providence Reds	AHL	58	5	28	33	122	6	0	6	6	6
1974–75	New York Rangers	NHL	4	0	2	2	0	—	—	—	—	—
1975–76	Providence Reds	AHL	26	5	17	22	81	—	—	—	—	—
1975–76	New York Rangers	NHL	21	1	3	4	66	—	—	—	—	—
1976–77	New York Rangers	NHL	66	3	18	21	100	—	—	—	—	—
1977–78	New York Rangers	NHL	56	2	19	21	63	3	0	0	0	11
1978–79	New York Rangers	NHL	76	11	17	28	151	17	3	4	7	45
1979–80	New York Rangers	NHL	77	12	25	37	186	8	2	1	3	8
1980–81	New York Rangers	NHL	79	11	36	47	132	2	0	2	2	9
1981–82	New York Rangers	NHL	64	13	36	49	105	10	1	4	5	6
1982–83	New York Rangers	NHL	78	8	42	50	132	7	1	6	7	10
1983–84	New York Rangers	NHL	68	7	26	33	168	1	0	0	0	2
1984–85	New York Rangers	NHL	16	2	1	3	10	—	—	—	—	—
1984–85	Buffalo Sabres	NHL	52	1	21	22	41	1	0	0	0	0
NHL totals			657	71	246	317	1154	49	7	17	24	91

Preceded by Rick Middleton	New York Rangers first-round draft pick 1974	Succeeded by Wayne Dillon
Preceded by Phil Esposito	New York Rangers captain 1978–81	Succeeded by Walt Tkaczuk
