= Hockey Sock Rock =

Single by Phil Esposito and The Ranger Rockers
- B-side: "Please Forgive My Misconduct Last night (Dionne and the Pucktones)"
- Released: 1979
- Recorded: 1979
- Genre: Rock, Pop
- Length: 3:04
- Label: Platinum Records 1217-75
- Songwriters: Alan Thicke, Danny Mann
- Producers: Alan Thicke, Bob Morgan

"Hockey Sock Rock" is a song written and produced by Alan Thicke, as a publicity tool for the New York Rangers and the National Hockey League (NHL) in 1979, as Rangers president Sonny Werblin worked to make the Rangers more hip in disco-era New York City; the proceeds of the recording went to the Juvenile Diabetes Research Foundation. It was released on Platinum Records 1217–75. Ranger Dave Maloney later said that supposedly, the record went on to sell over 100,000 copies; yet 90,000 of the sales could be attributed to Gordon Lightfoot, as he was a friend of Thicke's.

== A Side ==
The A Side features the "Phil Esposito and The Ranger Rockers", members of the New York Rangers, singing lyrics penned by Thicke and accompanied by his band. The Rangers who took part are Phil Esposito, Ron Duguay, Pat Hickey, Dave Maloney and John Davidson.

== B Side ==
The B side of the record featured three members of the Los Angeles Kings as "Dionne and the Puck-tones": Marcel Dionne, Charlie Simmer and Dave Taylor, singing another song by Thicke, "Please Forgive My Misconduct Last night".
