= Jim Higgins (ice hockey) =

American ice hockey player and coach

Biographical details
- Born: Cambridge, Massachusetts, U.S.

Playing career
- 1960–1963: Boston University
- Position: Defenseman

Coaching career (HC unless noted)
- 1967–1970: Falmouth High School
- 1970–1974: Dartmouth (assistant)
- 1974–1975: Brown (assistant)
- 1975–1977: Colgate
- 1977–1991: Princeton

Head coaching record
- Overall: 151-251-21 (.382)

Accomplishments and honors

Awards
- 2013 John "Snooks" Kelly Founders Award

Jim Higgins is an American retired ice hockey player and coach. Higgins is most remembered for his time at Princeton, coaching the Tigers for 14 years after spending the preceding decade building a coaching career. While Higgins failed to produce a single winning season during his time as a college head coach he is nevertheless the winningest ice hockey coach at Princeton since World War II (as of 2019). In recognition of his career Higgins was awarded the John "Snooks" Kelly Founders Award in 2013.

== Regular season and playoffs ==
			Regular season					Playoffs
Season	Team	League	GP	G	A	Pts	PIM	GP	G	A	Pts	PIM
1960–61	Boston University	NCAA	11	0	1	1	4	—	—	—	—	—
1961–62	Boston University	ECAC Hockey	24	0	2	2	12	—	—	—	—	—
1962–63	Boston University	ECAC Hockey	9	1	1	2	0	—	—	—	—	—
NCAA totals			44	1	4	5	16	—	—	—	—	—

== Head coaching record ==
Record table
Season	Team	Overall	Conference	Standing	Postseason
Colgate Red Raiders (ECAC Hockey) (1975–1977)
1975–76	Colgate	9-16-0	6-14-0	13th	
1976–77	Colgate	12-16-0	10-14-0	12th	
Colgate:		21-32-0	16-28-0		
Princeton Tigers (ECAC Hockey) (1977–1991)
1977–78	Princeton	9-14-2	7-13-1	14th	
1978–79	Princeton	5-17-4	2-15-4	16th	
1979–80	Princeton	11-15-0	9-12-0	11th	
1980–81	Princeton	12-13-0	10-11-0	t-10th	
1981–82	Princeton	9-14-3	7-12-2	13th	
1982–83	Princeton	9-14-2	7-12-2	13th	
1983–84	Princeton	6-18-1	5-15-1	t-15th	
1984–85	Princeton	12-14-2	7-12-2	8th	ECAC Quarterfinals
1985–86	Princeton	11-17-2	7-13-0	9th	
1986–87	Princeton	8-17-1	7-14-1	10th	
1987–88	Princeton	12-15-1	11-10-1	t-6th	ECAC Quarterfinals
1988–89	Princeton	6-19-1	4-17-1	11th	
1989–90	Princeton	12-14-1	11-10-1	7th	ECAC First Round
1990–91	Princeton	8-18-1	7-14-0	10th	ECAC First Round
Princeton:		130-219-21	101-180-16		
Total:		151-251-21			
National champion Postseason invitational champion Conference regular season champion Conference regular season and conference tournament champion Division regular season champion Division regular season and conference tournament champion Conference tournament champion
