= Tom Dockrell =

American ice hockey player and coach

Biographical details
- Born: July 19, 1924; Stoneham, Massachusetts, U.S.
- Died: August 9, 2012 (aged 88)

Playing career
- 1942–1943: Colgate
- 1946–1949: Colgate
- 1949–1953: Clinton Comets
- Position: Left wing

Coaching career (HC unless noted)
- 1950–1951: Colgate

Head coaching record
- Overall: 2-7-0 (.222)

Thomas R. Dockrell (1924-2012) was an American ice hockey player and coach for Colgate. Dockrell spent one season as Red Raiders coach before the program was dropped after the 1950–51 season. While the program was reestablished six years later, Dockrell was not retained. Dockrell served in the Army Air Force during World War II and was a member of the US AAU Team that was disqualified from competition at the 1948 Winter Olympics.

== Head coaching record ==
Record table
Season	Team	Overall	Conference	Standing	Postseason
Colgate Red Raiders Independent (1950–1951)
1950–51	Colgate	2-7-0	1-4-0	t-5th	
Colgate:		2-7-0			
Total:		2-7-0			
National champion Postseason invitational champion Conference regular season champion Conference regular season and conference tournament champion Division regular season champion Division regular season and conference tournament champion Conference tournament champion
