= John Howard Starr =

American sports coach

J. Howard Starr
Biographical details
- Born: July 16, 1898; New London, Connecticut
- Died: November 14, 1989 (aged 91); Florida
- Education: Springfield College

Coaching career (HC unless noted)
- 1932–1942: Colgate
- 1945–1950: Colgate

Head coaching record
- Overall: 87-74-4 (.539)

John Howard Starr (1898 – November 14, 1989) was head coach of the Colgate University hockey team for 15 years. He was born on John Street in New London, Connecticut, in 1898. He died November 14, 1989, in Florida. A 40-year member of the Colgate faculty, Howie retired in 1965 when the university's hockey arena was named in his honor. As head coach of hockey for 15 years (1932–42 and 1945–50) he won 87, lost 72 and tied four games. He was also Colgate's first swimming coach (1926–33). He was professor of physical education and chairman of the Department of Physical Education and Intramural Athletics, Colgate University, 1926–1965.

A 1922 graduate of Springfield College, he came to Colgate in 1926 from Greenville, South Carolina, where he had been director of health & physical education and basketball coach. At Colgate, he was an assistant professor of physical education, 1926-1934; associate professor, 1934–1946, and a full professor, 1946–1965. He instituted the first intramural athletic programs at Colgate in 1934. He was Coach of Swimming, 1926–1932 (coached first swimming team, to represent the university); coach of ice hockey, 1932–1950 (two undefeated seasons), and coach of gymnastics, 1928–1932. In 1965 at time of retirement, the ice rink was named Starr Rink.

When he retired, he took a position at Bowling Green State University in Ohio and helped oversee the development and operation of their new ice skating arena at the behest of then university president Jerome. During that period, he mentored a number of young skaters, including Scott Hamilton.

His professional memberships included:

- Colgate Eta chapter of Phi Beta Kappa (President, 1955).
- Board of directors, Sigma Delta Psi (National Athletic Fraternity)
- NCAA Ice Hockey Rules Committee, 6 years: chairman 1950–51.
- Charter and Life Member American Ice Hockey Coaches Association
- Charter member, College Intramurals Directors Association.
- Member, Hamilton Masonic Lodge #120 and Cyrus Chapter 50 R.A.M.
- Member, First Baptist Church, Hamilton, N.Y.
- Member, board of directors, Community Memorial Hospital, 1955–1965.
- Chairman, Hamilton, N.Y. Recreation Commission for 8 years.

He served nine months with the infantry in World War I. In 1942 he again enlisted in the military despite being over the required age. Concerned that he would be assigned stateside in a training capacity, he deliberately flunked his swimming test in order to avoid being selected as an instructor. A fellow college swimming coach was giving the test and, recognizing him floundering in the water, asked what he was up to; Starr got him to promise not to give him away. He was commissioned a captain in the Army Air Force in June 1942 and was assigned to the 8th Air Force in England in August 1942. He was part of a secret Military Intelligence Service unit known as MIS-X. The records of this unit remain classified to this date. For part of his service he was assigned as War Department Liaison Officer to British Intelligence Service units MI-5, MI-9, and MI-19. King George VI awarded him the Order of the British Empire Medal (OBE) for his service in 1945. He completed his military service as a lieutenant colonel, assigned as commanding officer (MIS-X), Fort Hunt, Virginia in 1945.

== Head coaching record ==
Record table
Season	Team	Overall	Conference	Standing	Postseason
Colgate Red Raiders Independent (1932–1942)
1932–33	Colgate	3-4-0			
1933–34	Colgate	1-9-1			
1934–35	Colgate	4-11-0			
1935–36	Colgate	3-10-1			
1936–37	Colgate	4-3-0			
1937–38	Colgate	3-4-0			
1938–39	Colgate	8-1-0			
1939–40	Colgate	9-4-0			
1940–41	Colgate	6-5-0			
1941–42	Colgate	10-3-0			
Colgate:		51-54-2			
Colgate Red Raiders Independent (1945–1950)
1945–46	Colgate	2-6-0			
1946–47	Colgate	14-0-0			
1947–48	Colgate	8-4-0			
1948–49	Colgate	5-3-1			
1949–50	Colgate	7-7-1			
Colgate:		36-20-2			
Total:		87-74-4			
National champion Postseason invitational champion Conference regular season champion Conference regular season and conference tournament champion Division regular season champion Division regular season and conference tournament champion Conference tournament champion
