= Billy O'Dwyer =

American ice hockey player (born 1960)

- Born: January 25, 1960 (age 66) Boston, Massachusetts, U.S.
- Height: 6 ft 0 in (183 cm)
- Weight: 190 lb (86 kg; 13 st 8 lb)
- Position: Centre
- Shot: Left
- Played for: Los Angeles Kings; Boston Bruins
- NHL draft: 157th overall, 1980; Los Angeles Kings
- Playing career: 1982–1992

William Michael "Bill" O'Dwyer (born January 25, 1960) is an American former professional ice hockey forward who played 120 games in the National Hockey League for the Boston Bruins and Los Angeles Kings between 1983 and 1990. The rest of his career was mainly spent in the minor American Hockey League.

== Career statistics ==
=== Regular season and playoffs ===
			Regular season					Playoffs
Season	Team	League	GP	G	A	Pts	PIM	GP	G	A	Pts	PIM
1977–78	Don Bosco Prep	HS-MA	—	—	—	—	—	—	—	—	—	—
1978–79	Boston College	ECAC	30	9	30	39	14	—	—	—	—	—
1979–80	Boston College	ECAC	33	20	22	42	22	—	—	—	—	—
1980–81	Boston College	ECAC	31	20	20	40	6	—	—	—	—	—
1981–82	Boston College	ECAC	30	15	26	41	10	—	—	—	—	—
1982–83	New Haven Nighthawks	AHL	77	24	23	47	29	11	3	4	7	9
1983–84	Los Angeles Kings	NHL	5	0	0	0	0	—	—	—	—	—
1983–84	New Haven Nighthawks	AHL	58	15	42	57	39	—	—	—	—	—
1984–85	Los Angeles Kings	NHL	13	1	0	1	15	—	—	—	—	—
1984–85	New Haven Nighthawks	AHL	46	19	24	43	27	—	—	—	—	—
1985–86	New Haven Nighthawks	AHL	41	10	14	25	41	5	0	1	1	2
1986–87	New Haven Nighthawks	AHL	65	22	42	64	74	3	0	0	0	14
1987–88	Boston Bruins	NHL	77	7	10	17	83	9	0	0	0	0
1988–89	Boston Bruins	NHL	19	1	2	3	8	—	—	—	—	—
1989–90	Boston Bruins	NHL	6	0	1	1	2	1	0	0	0	2
1989–90	Maine Mariners	AHL	71	26	45	71	56	—	—	—	—	—
1990–91	New Haven Nighthawks	AHL	6	2	1	3	2	—	—	—	—	—
1990–91	Phoenix Roadrunners	IHL	25	3	9	12	12	11	7	6	13	0
1991–92	Phoenix Roadrunners	IHL	39	9	17	26	12	—	—	—	—	—
AHL totals			364	118	192	310	268	19	3	5	8	25
NHL totals			120	9	13	22	108	10	0	0	0	2

== Awards and honors ==
Award	Year
All-ECAC Hockey Second Team	1979–80; 1980–81; 1981–82
