= List of All-ECAC Hockey Teams =

The All-ECAC Hockey Teams are composed of players at all positions from teams that are members of ECAC Hockey, an NCAA Division I hockey-only conference. Each year, from 1961–62 onward, at the conclusion of the ECAC Hockey regular season the head coaches of each member team vote for players to be placed on each all-conference team. The First Team and Second Team have been named in each ECAC Hockey season with a Third team added in 2005–06; a Rookie Team was added starting in 1987–88.

The all-conference teams are composed of one goaltender, two defensemen and three forwards. If a tie occurred for the final selection at any position, both players were included as part of the greater all-conference team; if a tie resulted in an increase in the number of superior all-stars, the inferior team would not be reduced in number (as happened in 1965–66 and 1983–84) until 2005–06, after which the inferior team will be reduced accordingly (as happened in 2006–07). Players may only appear once per year on any of the first, second, or third teams but freshman may appear on both the rookie team and one of the other all-conference teams. Jack Leetch is so far the only player to appear on the All-Star teams in two different positions (forward and defense).

In the first three years ECAC Hockey's all-conference teams were double in size for goaltenders and defensemen and triple for forwards, reflecting the 28–29 teams in the conference. After the 1963–64 season the ECAC split their conference into Division I and NCAA Division III classifications and subsequently reduced the team size to a standard (and current) format.

Due to two thirds of league members cancelling their seasons due to the COVID-19 pandemic, ECAC Hockey did not name a second- or third-team all-conference in 2020–21.

== All-conference teams ==
=== First Team ===
==== 1960s ====
1961–62
Player	Pos	Team
Glen Eberly	G	Boston University
Frank Stephenson	G	Colby
Arlie Parker	D	St. Lawrence
David Johnston	D	Harvard
Don Young	D	Colby
Jack Leetch	D	Boston College
Cal Wagner	D	Clarkson
Ron Ryan	F	Colby
Bill Hogan	F	Boston College
Dates Fryberger	F	Middlebury
Gene Kinasewich	F	Harvard
Ron Mason	F	St. Lawrence
Bob Brinkworth	F	Rensselaer
Tim Taylor	F	Harvard
Dave Grannis	F	Harvard
Hal Pettersen	F	Clarkson
Corby Adams	F	Clarkson

1962–63
Player	Pos	Team
Richie Broadbelt	G	St. Lawrence
Tom Apprille	G	Boston College
David Johnston	D	Harvard
Cal Wagner	D	Clarkson
Pat Brophy	D	Clarkson
Jack Callahan	D	Boston College
Larry Kish	D	Providence
Jack Leetch	F	Boston College
Bob Brinkworth	F	Rensselaer
Bill Hogan	F	Boston College
Dates Fryberger	F	Middlebury
Leo Dupere	F	Northeastern
Corby Adams	F	Clarkson
Ron Mason	F	St. Lawrence
Tom Roe	F	Williams
Gene Kinasewich	F	Harvard
Tim Taylor	F	Harvard

1963–64
Player	Pos	Team
Bob Perani	G	St. Lawrence
Bill Sack	G	Rensselaer
Larry Kish	D	Providence
Jim Salfi	D	St. Lawrence
Richie Green	D	Boston University
Fred Kitchen	D	Rensselaer
John Mechem	D	Colby
Bob Brinkworth	F	Rensselaer
Jerry Knightley	F	Rensselaer
Corby Adams	F	Clarkson
Gene Kinasewich	F	Harvard
Grant Heffernan	F	Providence
Ray Mooney	F	Providence
John Cunniff	F	Boston College
Ike Ikauniks	F	Harvard
Mike Thompson	F	Army
Leo Dupere	F	Northeastern
Leon Bryant	F	Brown

1964–65
Player	Pos	Team
Jack Ferreira	G	Boston University
Tom Ross	D	Boston University
Robert Gaudreau	D	Brown
John Cunniff	F	Boston College
Grant Heffernan	F	Providence
Jerry Knightley	F	Rensselaer

1965–66
Player	Pos	Team
Jack Ferreira	G	Boston University
Robert Gaudreau	D	Brown
Peter McLachlan	D	Boston University
Harry Orr	D	Cornell
Doug Ferguson	F	Cornell
Bruce Fennie	F	Boston University
Fred Bassi	F	Boston University

1966–67
Player	Pos	Team
Ken Dryden	G	Cornell
Harry Orr	D	Cornell
Peter McLachlan	D	Boston University
John Morrison	F	Yale
Doug Ferguson	F	Cornell
Wayne Small	F	Brown

1967–68
Player	Pos	Team
Ken Dryden	G	Cornell
Skip Stanowski	D	Cornell
Bruce Pattison	D	Cornell
Wayne Small	F	Brown
Peter Tufford	F	Cornell
Gary Croteau	F	St. Lawrence

1968–69
Player	Pos	Team
Ken Dryden	G	Cornell
Paul Hurley	D	Boston College
Bruce Pattison	D	Cornell
Brian Cornell	F	Cornell
Joe Cavanagh	F	Harvard
Herb Wakabayashi	F	Boston University

==== 1970s ====
1969–70
Player	Pos	Team
Brian Cropper	G	Cornell
Mike Hyndman	D	Boston University
Dan Lodboa	D	Cornell
Tommy Earl	F	Colgate
Curt Bennett	F	Brown
Tim Sheehy	F	Boston College

1970–71
Player	Pos	Team
Bruce Bullock	G	Clarkson
Bob Brown	D	Boston University
Steve Warr	D	Clarkson
Joe Cavanagh	F	Harvard
John Danby	F	Boston University
Steve Stirling	F	Boston University

1971–72
Player	Pos	Team
Dan Brady	G	Boston University
Bob Brown	D	Boston University
Steve Warr	D	Clarkson
Gordie Clark	F	New Hampshire
Larry Fullan	F	Cornell
Guy Smith	F	New Hampshire

1972–73
Player	Pos	Team
Ned Yetten	G	Boston College
Tom Mellor	D	Boston College
Vic Stanfield	D	Boston University
Gordie Clark	F	New Hampshire
Bob McManama	F	Harvard
Carlo Ugolini	F	Cornell

1973–74
Player	Pos	Team
Ed Walsh	G	Boston University
Vic Stanfield	D	Boston University
George Kuzmicz	D	Cornell
Bill Burlington	F	Boston University
Gordie Clark	F	New Hampshire
Randy Roth	F	Harvard

1974–75
Player	Pos	Team
Brian Petrovek	G	Harvard
Brian Durocher	G	Boston University
Vic Stanfield	D	Boston University
Ron Wilson	D	Providence
Mike Eruzione	F	Boston University
Tim O'Connell	F	Vermont
Jamie Hislop	F	New Hampshire

1975–76
Player	Pos	Team
Brian Shields	G	Clarkson
Ron Wilson	D	Providence
Peter Brown	D	Boston University
Jamie Hislop	F	New Hampshire
Rick Meagher	F	Boston University
Mike Eruzione	F	Boston University

1976–77
Player	Pos	Team
Brian Shields	G	Clarkson
Jack Hughes	D	Harvard
Tim Bothwell	D	Brown
Dave Taylor	F	Clarkson
Rick Meagher	F	Boston University
Bob Miller	F	New Hampshire

1977–78
Player	Pos	Team
Mike Laycock	G	Brown
Peter Shier	D	Cornell
Jack O'Callahan	D	Boston University
Lance Nethery	F	Cornell
Joe Mullen	F	Boston College
Ralph Cox	F	New Hampshire

1978–79
Player	Pos	Team
Jim Craig	G	Boston University
Louis Cote	D	Vermont
Jack O'Callahan	D	Boston University
Joe Mullen	F	Boston College
Lance Nethery	F	Cornell
Ralph Cox	F	New Hampshire

==== 1980s ====
1979–80
Player	Pos	Team
Doug Ellis	G	Boston College
Louis Cote	D	Vermont
Andre Aubut	D	Maine
Craig Homola	F	Vermont
Ross Brownridge	F	Dartmouth
Mike Prestidge	F	Clarkson

1980–81
Player	Pos	Team
Don Sylvestri	G	Clarkson
Ed Small	D	Clarkson
Mark Fusco	D	Harvard
Bryan Cleaver	F	Clarkson
Gary Conn	F	Maine
Sandy Beadle	F	Northeastern

1981–82
Player	Pos	Team
Brian Hayward	G	Cornell
Chris Renaud	D	Colgate
Scot Kleinendorst	D	Providence
Steve Cruickshank	F	Clarkson
Kirk McCaskill	F	Vermont
Andy Brickley	F	New Hampshire

1982–83
Player	Pos	Team
Darren Eliot	G	Cornell
Randy Velischek	D	Providence
Mark Fusco	D	Harvard
Kurt Kleinendorst	F	Providence
Scott Fusco	F	Harvard
Bob Brooke	F	Yale

1983–84
Player	Pos	Team
Cleon Daskalakis	G	Boston University
Jim Chisholm	D	Boston College
T. J. Connolly	D	Boston University
Bob Armstrong	D	Clarkson
Gaetano Orlando	F	Providence
Steve Smith	F	Colgate
Kevin Foster	F	Vermont

1984–85
Player	Pos	Team
Jeff Cooper	G	Colgate
Dave Fretz	D	Clarkson
Ken Hammond	D	Rensselaer
John Carter	F	Rensselaer
Scott Fusco	F	Harvard
Adam Oates	F	Rensselaer

1985–86
Player	Pos	Team
Tom Draper	G	Vermont
Mike Dark	D	Rensselaer
Cliff Abrecht	D	Princeton
Scott Fusco	F	Harvard
Joe Nieuwendyk	F	Cornell
Randy Wood	F	Yale

1986–87
Player	Pos	Team
Mike O'Neill	G	Yale
Randy Taylor	D	Harvard
Mark Benning	D	Harvard
Joe Nieuwendyk	F	Cornell
Lane MacDonald	F	Harvard
Bob Kudelski	F	Yale

1987–88
Player	Pos	Team
John Fletcher	G	Clarkson
Brian McColgan	D	St. Lawrence
Don Sweeney	D	Harvard
Pete Lappin	F	St. Lawrence
Réjean Boivin	F	Colgate
John Messuri	F	Princeton

1988–89
Player	Pos	Team
Mike O'Neill	G	Yale
Dave Williams	D	Dartmouth
Mike Hurlbut	D	St. Lawrence
Scott Young	D	Colgate
Lane MacDonald	F	Harvard
Kyle McDonough	F	Vermont
Jarmo Kekäläinen	F	Clarkson

==== 1990s ====
1989–90
Player	Pos	Team
Dave Gagnon	G	Colgate
Dan Ratushny	D	Cornell
Mike Brewer	D	Brown
Joé Juneau	F	Rensselaer
C. J. Young	F	Harvard
Mike Vukonich	F	Harvard
Joel Gardner	F	Colgate

1990–91
Player	Pos	Team
Les Kuntar	G	St. Lawrence
Dan Ratushny	D	Cornell
Dave Tretowicz	D	Clarkson
Peter Ciavaglia	F	Harvard
Ted Donato	F	Harvard
Andy Pritchard	F	St. Lawrence

1991–92
Player	Pos	Team
Christian Soucy	G	Vermont
Mike Brewer	D	Brown
Daniel Laperrière	D	St. Lawrence
Dale Band	F	Colgate
Mark Kaufmann	F	Yale
Mike Lappin	F	St. Lawrence

1992–93
Player	Pos	Team
Neil Little	G	Rensselaer
Jack Duffy	D	Yale
Aaron Miller	D	Vermont
Ted Drury	F	Harvard
Mark Kaufmann	F	Yale
Marko Tuomainen	F	Clarkson

1993–94
Player	Pos	Team
Geoff Finch	G	Brown
Sean McCann	D	Harvard
Brian Mueller	D	Clarkson
Craig Conroy	F	Clarkson
Brian Farrell	F	Harvard
Steve Martins	F	Harvard

1994–95
Player	Pos	Team
Tim Thomas	G	Vermont
Brian Mueller	D	Clarkson
Mike Traggio	D	Brown
Éric Perrin	F	Vermont
Martin St. Louis	F	Vermont
Marko Tuomainen	F	Clarkson

1995–96
Player	Pos	Team
Tim Thomas	G	Vermont
Steve Wilson	D	Cornell
Brad Dexter	D	Colgate
Éric Perrin	F	Vermont
Martin St. Louis	F	Vermont
Burke Murphy	F	St. Lawrence

1996–97
Player	Pos	Team
Trevor Koenig	G	Union
Matt Pagnutti	D	Clarkson
Steve Wilson	D	Cornell
Mike Harder	F	Colgate
Martin St. Louis	F	Vermont
Todd White	F	Clarkson

1997–98
Player	Pos	Team
Alex Westlund	G	Yale
Ray Giroux	D	Yale
Steve Shirreffs	D	Princeton
Eric Healey	F	Rensselaer
Damian Prescott	F	Brown
Jeff Hamilton	F	Yale

1998–99
Player	Pos	Team
Eric Heffler	G	St. Lawrence
Jeff Burgoyne	D	Cornell
Willie Mitchell	D	Clarkson
Dan Riva	F	Rensselaer
Erik Cole	F	Clarkson
Jeff Hamilton	F	Yale

==== 2000s ====
1999–00
Player	Pos	Team
Joel Laing	G	Rensselaer
Cory Murphy	D	Colgate
Kent Huskins	D	Clarkson
Andy McDonald	F	Colgate
Brad Tapper	F	Rensselaer
Brandon Dietrich	F	St. Lawrence

2000–01
Player	Pos	Team
Oliver Jonas	G	Harvard
Matt Desrosiers	D	St. Lawrence
Kent Huskins	D	Clarkson
Erik Anderson	F	St. Lawrence
Mike Gellard	F	St. Lawrence
Jeff Hamilton	F	Yale

2001–02
Player	Pos	Team
Matt Underhill	G	Cornell
Kerry Ellis-Toddington	D	Clarkson
Douglas Murray	D	Cornell
Marc Cavosie	F	Rensselaer
Mike Maturo	F	Dartmouth
Matt Murley	F	Rensselaer

2002–03
Player	Pos	Team
David LeNeveu	G	Cornell
Douglas Murray	D	Cornell
Randy Jones	D	Clarkson
Dominic Moore	F	Harvard
Tim Pettit	F	Harvard
Chris Higgins	F	Yale

2003–04
Player	Pos	Team
Yann Danis	G	Brown
Grant Lewis	D	Dartmouth
Ryan Glenn	D	St. Lawrence
Brady Leisenring	F	Vermont
Lee Stempniak	F	Dartmouth
Jon Smyth	F	Colgate

2004–05
Player	Pos	Team
David McKee	G	Cornell
Luc Paquin	D	Princeton
Noah Welch	D	Harvard
Matt Moulson	F	Cornell
Lee Stempniak	F	Dartmouth
T. J. Trevelyan	F	St. Lawrence

2005–06
Player	Pos	Team
Mark Dekanich	G	Colgate
Reid Cashman	D	Quinnipiac
Mike Madill	D	St. Lawrence
T. J. Trevelyan	F	St. Lawrence
Tyler Burton	F	Colgate
Mike Ouellette	F	Dartmouth

2006–07
Player	Pos	Team
David Leggio	G	Clarkson
Reid Cashman	D	Quinnipiac
Drew Bagnall	D	St. Lawrence
David Jones	F	Dartmouth
Kyle Rank	F	St. Lawrence
Nick Dodge	F	Clarkson

2007–08
Player	Pos	Team
Kyle Richter	G	Harvard
Grant Clitsome	D	Clarkson
Mike Moore	D	Princeton
Nick Johnson	F	Dartmouth
Lee Jubinville	F	Princeton
Steve Zalewski	F	Clarkson

2008–09
Player	Pos	Team
Zane Kalemba	G	Princeton
Lane Caffaro	D	Union
Zach Miskovic	D	St. Lawrence
Mark Arcobello	F	Yale
Riley Nash	F	Cornell
David McIntyre	F	Colgate

==== 2010s ====
2009–10
Player	Pos	Team
Ben Scrivens	G	Cornell
Mike Schreiber	D	Union
Brendon Nash	D	Cornell
Chase Polacek	F	Rensselaer
Broc Little	F	Yale
Sean Backman	F	Yale

2010–11
Player	Pos	Team
Keith Kinkaid	G	Union
Nick Bailen	D	Rensselaer
Taylor Fedun	D	Princeton
Chase Polacek	F	Rensselaer
Brian O'Neill	F	Yale
Andrew Miller	F	Yale

2011–12
Player	Pos	Team
Troy Grosenick	G	Union
Danny Biega	D	Harvard
Mathew Bodie	D	Union
Alex Killorn	F	Harvard
Brian O'Neill	F	Yale
Austin Smith	F	Colgate

2012–13
Player	Pos	Team
Eric Hartzell	G	Quinnipiac
Nick Bailen	D	Rensselaer
George Hughes	D	St. Lawrence
Greg Carey	F	St. Lawrence
Kyle Flanagan	F	St. Lawrence
Andrew Miller	F	Yale

2013–14
Player	Pos	Team
Colin Stevens	G	Union
Mathew Bodie	D	Union
Shayne Gostisbehere	D	Union
Ryan Haggerty	F	Rensselaer
Daniel Carr	F	Union
Greg Carey	F	St. Lawrence

2014–15
Player	Pos	Team
Alex Lyon	G	Yale
Joakim Ryan	D	Cornell
Rob O'Gara	D	Yale
Jimmy Vesey	F	Harvard
Daniel Ciampini	F	Union
Matthew Peca	F	Quinnipiac

2015–16
Player	Pos	Team
Alex Lyon	G	Yale
Gavin Bayreuther	D	St. Lawrence
Rob O'Gara	D	Yale
Jimmy Vesey	F	Harvard
Sam Anas	F	Quinnipiac
Nick Lappin	F	Brown

2016–17
Player	Pos	Team
Kyle Hayton	G	St. Lawrence
Gavin Bayreuther	D	St. Lawrence
Adam Fox	D	Harvard
Spencer Foo	F	Union
Alexander Kerfoot	F	Harvard
Mike Vecchione	F	Union

2017–18
Player	Pos	Team
Matthew Galajda	G	Cornell
Kelly Summers	D	Clarkson
Adam Fox	D	Harvard
Ryan Donato	F	Harvard
Sheldon Rempal	F	Clarkson
Max Véronneau	F	Princeton

2018–19
Player	Pos	Team
Andrew Shortridge	G	Quinnipiac
Adam Fox	D	Harvard
Chase Priskie	D	Quinnipiac
Morgan Barron	F	Cornell
Ryan Kuffner	F	Princeton
Joe Snively	F	Yale

==== 2020s ====
2019–20
Player	Pos	Team
Frank Marotte	G	Clarkson
Yanni Kaldis	D	Cornell
Jack Rathbone	D	Harvard
Nick Abruzzese	F	Harvard
Morgan Barron	F	Cornell
Drew O'Connor	F	Dartmouth

2020–21
Player	Pos	Team
Keith Petruzelli	G	Quinnipiac
Zach Metsa	D	Quinnipiac
Connor McCarthy	D	Clarkson
Odeen Tufto	F	Quinnipiac
Zach Tsekos	F	Clarkson
Cameron Buhl	F	St. Lawrence
Josh McKechney	F	Colgate

2021–22
Player	Pos	Team
Yaniv Perets	G	Quinnipiac
Zach Metsa	D	Quinnipiac
Sam Malinski	D	Cornell
Alex Campbell	F	Clarkson
Mathieu Gosselin	F	Clarkson
Nick Abruzzese	F	Harvard

2022–23
Player	Pos	Team
Yaniv Perets	G	Quinnipiac
Henry Thrun	D	Harvard
Sam Malinski	D	Cornell
Collin Graf	F	Quinnipiac
Sean Farrell	F	Harvard
Alex Young	F	Colgate

2023–24
Player	Pos	Team
Ian Shane	G	Cornell
John Prokop	D	Union
Jayden Lee	D	Quinnipiac
Collin Graf	F	Quinnipiac
Luke Haymes	F	Dartmouth
Gabriel Seger	F	Cornell

2024–25
Player	Pos	Team
Ethan Langenegger	G	Clarkson
CJ Foley	D	Dartmouth
Trey Taylor	D	Clarkson
Brett Chorske	F	Colgate
Ayrton Martino	F	Clarkson
Ellis Rickwood	F	Clarkson

2025–26
Player	Pos	Team
Alexis Cournoyer	G	Cornell
Elliott Groenewold	D	Quinnipiac
Tyler Dunbar	D	Union
Jonathan Castagna	F	Cornell
Ethan Wyttenbach	F	Quinnipiac
Hayden Stavroff	F	Dartmouth

==== First Team players by school ====
===== Current members =====
School	Winners
Harvard	52
Clarkson	51
Cornell	49
St. Lawrence	35
Yale	27
Rensselaer	24
Colgate	21
Quinnipiac	18
Brown	15
Union	15
Dartmouth	13
Princeton	10

===== Former members =====
School	Winners
Boston University	32
Vermont	18
Boston College	16
Providence	11
New Hampshire	10
Colby	4
Northeastern	3
Maine	2
Middlebury	2
Army	1
Williams	1

==== Multiple appearances ====
Player	First Team appearances
Corby Adams	3
Bob Brinkworth	3
Gordie Clark	3
Ken Dryden	3
Adam Fox	3
Scott Fusco	3
Jeff Hamilton	3
Gene Kinasewich	3
Martin St. Louis	3
Vic Stanfield	3
many players tied with	2

=== Second Team ===
==== 1960s ====
1961–62
Player	Pos	Team
Richie Broadbelt	G	St. Lawrence
Wayne Gibbons	G	Clarkson
Laing Kennedy	G	Cornell
Brian Robins	D	Rensselaer
Joe McGeough	D	Providence
Harry Howell	D	Harvard
Tom McMahon	D	Rensselaer
Pat Brophy	D	Clarkson
Jim Josephson	F	Rensselaer
Rollie Anderson	F	St. Lawrence
Tom Roe	F	Williams
Dave Leighton	F	Dartmouth
Marsh Tschida	F	Providence
John Cook	F	Princeton
Roger Purdie	F	Clarkson
Ron Famigletti	F	Bowdoin
Dave Sveden	F	Colby

1962–63
Player	Pos	Team
Godfrey Wood	G	Harvard
Laing Kennedy	G	Cornell
Richie Green	D	Boston University
John Weekes	D	Middlebury
Brian Pryce	D	Rensselaer
Harry Howell	D	Harvard
Leon Bryant	F	Brown
Ike Ikauniks	F	Harvard
John Cook	F	Princeton
Lou Lamoriello	F	Providence
Roger Purdie	F	Clarkson
Bill Lamarche	F	Harvard
Jerry Knightley	F	Rensselaer
Mike Denihan	F	Boston University
Brian Wilkinson	F	Clarkson
Steve Riggs	F	Colgate

1963–64
Player	Pos	Team
Jack Ferriera	G	Boston University
Neil Mieras	G	Army
Dick Peterson	D	Army
Bill Grisdale	D	Rensselaer
Mike Petterson	D	Harvard
Robert Gaudreau	D	Brown
Ron Butterfield	D	Army
Brian Wilkinson	F	Clarkson
Terry Chapman	F	Brown
Roger Purdie	F	Clarkson
John Keough	F	Providence
Arnie O'Reilly	F	St. Lawrence
Bruce Fennie	F	Boston University
Steve Riggs	F	Colgate
Dave Ross	F	St. Lawrence
Phil Dyer	F	Boston College
Bruce Davey	F	Colby
Larry Bone	F	Northeastern

1964–65
Player	Pos	Team
Terry Yurkiewicz	G	Clarkson
Don Turcotte	D	Northeastern
Ralph Toran	D	Boston College
Doug Ferguson	F	Cornell
Dean Matthews	F	Dartmouth
Terry Chapman	F	Brown

1965–66
Player	Pos	Team
Terry Yurkiewicz	G	Clarkson
Gary Petterson	D	Clarkson
Tom Ross	D	Boston University
Tom Hurley	F	Clarkson
John Cunniff	F	Boston College
Mike Doran	F	Cornell

1966–67
Player	Pos	Team
Wayne Ryan	G	Boston University
Don Turcotte	D	Northeastern
Brian Gilmour	D	Boston University
Dennis Macks	F	Brown
Jerry York	F	Boston College
Mike Doran	F	Cornell

1967–68
Player	Pos	Team
Ken Leu	G	Northeastern
Thomas Rawls	D	Princeton
Bob Carr	D	Harvard
Mike Hyndman	F	Boston University
Brian Cornell	F	Cornell
Herb Wakabayashi	F	Boston University
John McLennan	F	Clarkson
Dale Watson	F	Rensselaer

1968–69
Player	Pos	Team
Rick Metzer	G	New Hampshire
Curt Bennett	D	Brown
Chris Gurry	D	Harvard
Mike Hyndman	F	Boston University
Tim Sheehy	F	Boston College
Peter Tufford	F	Cornell

==== 1970s ====
1969–70
Player	Pos	Team
Don McGinnis	G	Brown
Tom Mellor	D	Boston College
Wayne LaChance	D	Clarkson
Joe Cavanagh	F	Harvard
John Hughes	F	Cornell
David Poile	F	Northeastern

1970–71
Player	Pos	Team
Brian Cropper	G	Cornell
Tom Mellor	D	Boston College
Ric Jordan	D	Boston University
Jerry Kemp	F	Clarkson
Brian McCutcheon	F	Cornell
Kevin Pettit	F	Cornell

1971–72
Player	Pos	Team
Don Cutts	G	Rensselaer
Ric Jordan	D	Boston University
Jim Higgs	D	Cornell
John Danby	F	Boston University
Dave Hynes	F	Harvard
Bob McManama	F	Harvard

1972–73
Player	Pos	Team
Don Cutts	G	Rensselaer
Bill Murray	D	Cornell
Keith Smith	D	Brown
Bill Corkery	F	Harvard
Steve Dolloff	F	Boston University
Dave Wisener	F	Boston University

1973–74
Player	Pos	Team
Cap Raeder	G	New Hampshire
Levy Byrd	D	Harvard
Peter Brown	D	Boston University
Bob Goodenow	F	Harvard
Tom Fleming	F	Dartmouth
Rick Meagher	F	Boston University

1974–75
Player	Pos	Team
Tom McNamara	G	Vermont
John Glynne	D	Vermont
Peter Brown	D	Boston University
Jim Thomas	F	Harvard
Dave Peace	F	Cornell
Randy Roth	F	Harvard
Rick Meagher	F	Boston University

1975–76
Player	Pos	Team
Paul Skidmore	G	Boston College
Kevin McCabe	G	Brown
Bill Blackwood	D	Clarkson
Tim Burke	D	New Hampshire
Cliff Cox	F	New Hampshire
Richie Smith	F	Boston College
Bill Gilligan	F	Brown

1976–77
Player	Pos	Team
Paul Skidmore	G	Boston College
Ron Wilson	D	Providence
Bill Blackwood	D	Clarkson
Tim Burke	D	New Hampshire
Mike Eruzione	F	Boston University
Lance Nethery	F	Cornell
Bob Ferriter	F	Boston College

1977–78
Player	Pos	Team
Ian Harrison	G	Rensselaer
Bill Blackwood	D	Clarkson
Jack Hughes	D	Harvard
Dick Lamby	D	Boston University
Dave Silk	F	Boston University
Marty McNally	F	Clarkson
Kevin Zappia	F	Clarkson

1978–79
Player	Pos	Team
Greg Moffett	G	New Hampshire
Jim Korn	D	Providence
Mike Mastrullo	D	Brown
Bob Gould	F	New Hampshire
Brock Tredway	F	Cornell
Colin Ahern	F	Providence

==== 1980s ====
1979–80
Player	Pos	Team
Sylvain Turcotte	G	Vermont
Ed Small	D	Clarkson
Scot Kleinendorst	D	Providence
Bill Army	F	Boston College
Steve Cruickshank	F	Clarkson
Billy O'Dwyer	F	Boston College
Steve O'Neill	F	Providence

1980–81
Player	Pos	Team
Jeff Nord	G	Maine
Chris Renaud	D	Colgate
Andre Aubut	D	Maine
Billy O'Dwyer	F	Boston College
Steve Cruickshank	F	Clarkson
Dan Fridgen	F	Colgate

1981–82
Player	Pos	Team
Bob O'Connor	G	Boston College
Randy Velischek	D	Providence
Mark Fusco	D	Harvard
Dan Poliziani	F	Yale
Kurt Kleinendorst	F	Providence
Billy O'Dwyer	F	Boston College

1982–83
Player	Pos	Team
Cleon Daskalakis	G	Boston University
Gray Weicker	G	St. Lawrence
Kent Carlson	D	St. Lawrence
Dave Fretz	D	Clarkson
Colin Patterson	F	Clarkson
Paul Guay	F	Providence
Normand Lacombe	F	New Hampshire

1983–84
Player	Pos	Team
Bruce Gillies	G	New Hampshire
Peter Taglianetti	D	Providence
Brian Byrnes	D	New Hampshire
Adam Oates	F	Rensselaer
John Carter	F	Rensselaer
Marty Dallman	F	Rensselaer

1984–85
Player	Pos	Team
Grant Blair	G	Harvard
Peter Sawkins	D	Yale
Steve Tuite	D	St. Lawrence
Duanne Moeser	F	Cornell
Peter Natyshak	F	Cornell
Randy Wood	F	Yale

1985–86
Player	Pos	Team
Doug Dadswell	G	Cornell
Randy Taylor	D	Harvard
Mark Benning	D	Harvard
Chris Norton	D	Cornell
Gerard Waslen	F	Colgate
Bob Logan	F	Yale
Tim Smith	F	Harvard

1986–87
Player	Pos	Team
Scott Yearwood	G	St. Lawrence
Wayne Crowley	G	Colgate
Hank Lammens	D	St. Lawrence
Dave Baseggio	D	Yale
Tim Barakett	F	Harvard
Pete Lappin	F	St. Lawrence
John Messuri	F	Princeton

1987–88
Player	Pos	Team
Steve Laurin	G	Dartmouth
Chris Norton	D	Cornell
Hank Lammens	D	St. Lawrence
Luciano Borsato	F	Clarkson
Ian Boyce	F	Vermont
Kyle McDonough	F	Vermont

1988–89
Player	Pos	Team
Paul Cohen	G	Colgate
Dave Baseggio	D	Yale
Mike Bishop	D	St. Lawrence
C. J. Young	F	Harvard
Allen Bourbeau	F	Harvard
Peter Ciavaglia	F	Harvard

==== 1990s ====
1989–90
Player	Pos	Team
Chris Harvey	G	Brown
Dave Tretowicz	D	Clarkson
Mike McKee	D	Princeton
Joe Day	F	St. Lawrence
Andre Faust	F	Princeton
Greg Polaski	F	Princeton

1990–91
Player	Pos	Team
Chris Rogles	G	Clarkson
Mike Brewer	D	Brown
Daniel Laperrière	D	St. Lawrence
Joé Juneau	F	Rensselaer
John LeClair	F	Vermont
Mike Vukonich	F	Harvard

1991–92
Player	Pos	Team
Parris Duffus	G	Cornell
Stephane Robitaille	D	Rensselaer
Jack Duffy	D	Yale
Derek Chauvette	F	Brown
Andre Faust	F	Princeton
Hugo Belanger	F	Clarkson

1992–93
Player	Pos	Team
Christian Soucy	G	Vermont
Ted Beattie	D	St. Lawrence
Brad Layzell	D	Rensselaer
Scott Fraser	F	Dartmouth
Scott Hanley	F	Brown
Todd Marchant	F	Clarkson

1993–94
Player	Pos	Team
Jason Currie	G	Clarkson
Sean O'Brien	D	Princeton
Derek Maguire	D	Harvard
Ron Pasco	F	Rensselaer
Chris Kaban	F	Brown
Bruce Gardiner	F	Colgate

1994–95
Player	Pos	Team
Todd Sullivan	G	Yale
Adam Bartell	D	Rensselaer
Brad Dexter	D	Colgate
Mike Harder	F	Colgate
Burke Murphy	F	St. Lawrence
Patrice Robitaille	F	Clarkson

1995–96
Player	Pos	Team
Dan Brenzavich	G	Colgate
Jeff Kungle	D	St. Lawrence
Patrick Rochon	D	Rensselaer
Mike Harder	F	Colgate
Chris DeProfio	F	Colgate
Todd White	F	Clarkson

1996–97
Player	Pos	Team
Dan Murphy	G	Clarkson
Ray Giroux	D	Yale
Andrew Will	D	Union
Paul DiFrancesco	F	St. Lawrence
Eric Healey	F	Rensselaer
Éric Perrin	F	Vermont

1997–98
Player	Pos	Team
Jason Elliott	G	Cornell
Willie Mitchell	D	Clarkson
Jimmy Andersson	D	Brown
Paul DiFrancesco	F	St. Lawrence
Jeff Halpern	F	Princeton
Chris Clark	F	Clarkson

1998–99
Player	Pos	Team
Alex Westlund	G	Yale
Steve Shirreffs	D	Princeton
Jason Reid	D	Vermont
Andy McDonald	F	Colgate
Jeff Halpern	F	Princeton
Bob Prier	F	St. Lawrence

==== 2000s ====
1999–00
Player	Pos	Team
Derek Gustafson	G	St. Lawrence
Justin Harney	D	St. Lawrence
Brian Pothier	D	Rensselaer
Erik Anderson	F	St. Lawrence
Erik Cole	F	Clarkson
Kirk Lamb	F	Princeton

2000–01
Player	Pos	Team
Mike Walsh	G	Clarkson
Trevor Byrne	D	Dartmouth
Cory Murphy	D	Colgate
Dominic Moore	F	Harvard
Sean Nolan	F	Colgate
Matt Poapst	F	Clarkson

2001–02
Player	Pos	Team
Yann Danis	G	Brown
Trevor Byrne	D	Dartmouth
Mark McRae	D	Cornell
Stephen Bâby	F	Cornell
Chris Higgins	F	Yale
Brett Nowak	F	Harvard

2002–03
Player	Pos	Team
Yann Danis	G	Brown
Noah Welch	D	Harvard
Trevor Byrne	D	Dartmouth
Scooter Smith	F	Colgate
Stephen Bâby	F	Cornell
Ryan Vesce	F	Cornell

2003–04
Player	Pos	Team
Nathan Marsters	G	Rensselaer
Scott Basiuk	D	Rensselaer
Rob Brown	D	Colgate
Joe Zappala	F	Yale
Hugh Jessiman	F	Dartmouth
Kevin Croxton	F	Rensselaer

2004–05
Player	Pos	Team
Dov Grumet-Morris	G	Harvard
Charlie Cook	D	Cornell
Jaime Sifers	D	Vermont
Dustin Sproat	F	Princeton
Tom Cavanagh	F	Harvard
Scott Misfud	F	Vermont

2005–06
Player	Pos	Team
Kris Mayotte	G	Union
Grant Lewis	D	Dartmouth
Dylan Reese	D	Harvard
Kyle Wilson	F	Colgate
David Jones	F	Dartmouth
Matt Moulson	F	Cornell

2006–07
Player	Pos	Team
Mark Dekanich	G	Colgate
Alex Petizian	G	St. Lawrence
Sean Hurley	D	Brown
Dylan Reese	D	Harvard
Tyler Burton	F	Colgate
Jeff Prough	F	Brown
Jesse Winchester	F	Colgate

2007–08
Player	Pos	Team
David Leggio	G	Clarkson
Lane Caffaro	D	Union
Sean Hurley	D	Brown
Tyler Burton	F	Colgate
Colin Greening	F	Cornell
Brett Wilson	F	Princeton

2008–09
Player	Pos	Team
Ben Scrivens	G	Cornell
Tom Dignard	D	Yale
Brendon Nash	D	Cornell
Sean Backman	F	Yale
Bryan Leitch	F	Quinnipiac
Colin Greening	F	Cornell

==== 2010s ====
2009–10
Player	Pos	Team
Allen York	G	Rensselaer
Tom Dignard	D	Yale
Taylor Fedun	D	Princeton
Mario Valery-Trabucco	F	Union
David McIntyre	F	Colgate
Colin Greening	F	Cornell

2010–11
Player	Pos	Team
James Mello	G	Dartmouth
Brock Matheson	D	Union
Danny Biega	D	Harvard
Jack Maclellan	F	Brown
Joe Devin	F	Cornell
Kelly Zajac	F	Union

2011–12
Player	Pos	Team
Andy Iles	G	Cornell
Nick D'Agostino	D	Cornell
Michael Sdao	D	Princeton
Jack Maclellan	F	Brown
Chris Wagner	F	Colgate
Jeremy Welsh	F	Union

2012–13
Player	Pos	Team
Jason Kasdorf	G	Rensselaer
Mike Keenan	D	Dartmouth
Shayne Gostisbehere	D	Union
Kenny Agostino	F	Yale
Andrew Calof	F	Princeton
Matt Lorito	F	Brown

2013–14
Player	Pos	Team
Andy Iles	G	Cornell
Joakim Ryan	D	Cornell
Gavin Bayreuther	D	St. Lawrence
Jesse Root	F	Yale
Kellen Jones	F	Quinnipiac
Sam Anas	F	Quinnipiac

2014–15
Player	Pos	Team
Kyle Hayton	G	St. Lawrence
Eric Sweetman	D	St. Lawrence
Patrick McNally	D	Harvard
Kyle Criscuolo	F	Harvard
Sam Anas	F	Quinnipiac
Eric Neiley	F	Dartmouth

2015–16
Player	Pos	Team
Jason Kasdorf	G	Rensselaer
Devon Toews	D	Quinnipiac
Eric Sweetman	D	St. Lawrence
Kyle Criscuolo	F	Harvard
Tim Clifton	F	Quinnipiac
Travis St. Denis	F	Quinnipiac

2016–17
Player	Pos	Team
Alex Sakellaropoulos	G	Union
James De Haas	D	Clarkson
Jeff Taylor	D	Union
Ryan Donato	F	Harvard
Max Véronneau	F	Princeton
John Hayden	F	Yale

2017–18
Player	Pos	Team
Colton Point	G	Colgate
Chase Priskie	D	Quinnipiac
Terrance Amorosa	D	Clarkson
Anthony Angello	F	Cornell
Joe Snively	F	Yale
Ryan Kuffner	F	Princeton

2018–19
Player	Pos	Team
Jake Kielly	G	Clarkson
Yanni Kaldis	D	Cornell
Aaron Thow	D	Clarkson
Haralds Egle	F	Clarkson
Odeen Tufto	F	Quinnipiac
Max Véronneau	F	Princeton

==== 2020s ====
2019–20
Player	Pos	Team
Owen Savory	G	Rensselaer
Connor McCarthy	D	Clarkson
Will Reilly	D	Rensselaer
Jack Drury	F	Harvard
Curtis Hall	F	Yale
Odeen Tufto	F	Quinnipiac

2020–21
No team named

2021–22
Player	Pos	Team
Mitchell Gibson	G	Harvard
Noah Beck	D	Clarkson
Henry Thrun	D	Harvard
Zach Tsekos	F	Clarkson
Ture Linden	F	Rensselaer
Matt Stienburg	F	Cornell

2022–23
Player	Pos	Team
Mitchell Gibson	G	Harvard
Zach Metsa	D	Quinnipiac
Luc Salem	D	St. Lawrence
Matthew Coronato	F	Harvard
Alex Laferriere	F	Harvard
Ethan de Jong	F	Quinnipiac

2023–24
Player	Pos	Team
Cooper Black	G	Dartmouth
Trey Taylor	D	Clarkson
Tommy Bergsland	D	Colgate
Jacob Quillan	F	Quinnipiac
Sam Lipkin	F	Quinnipiac
Liam Robertson	F	Union

2024–25
Player	Pos	Team
Lawton Zacher	G	Brown
Tommy Bergsland	D	Colgate
Tristan Sarsland	D	Clarkson
Dalton Bancroft	F	Cornell
Mason Marcellus	F	Quinnipiac
Jack Ricketts	F	Quinnipiac

2025–26
Player	Pos	Team
Emmett Croteau	G	Dartmouth
Xavier Veilleux	D	Cornell
Isaiah Norlin	D	Colgate
Antonin Verreault	F	Quinnipiac
Brandon Buhr	F	Union
Hank Cleaves	F	Dartmouth

==== Second Team players by school ====
===== Current members =====
School	Winners
Clarkson	49
Harvard	46
Cornell	44
Rensselaer	30
Colgate	29
St. Lawrence	29
Brown	26
Princeton	21
Yale	20
Dartmouth	17
Quinnipiac	17
Union	12

===== Former members =====
School	Winners
Boston University	23
Boston College	16
Providence	13
Vermont	11
New Hampshire	10
Northeastern	5
Army	3
Colby	2
Maine	2
Bowdoin	1
Middlebury	1
Williams	1

==== Multiple appearances ====
Player	Second Team appearances
Bill Blackwood	3
Trevor Byrne	3
Colin Greening	3
Billy O'Dwyer	3
Roger Purdie	3
many players tied with	2

=== Third Team ===
==== 2000s ====
2005–06
Player	Pos	Team
Eric Leroux	G	Princeton
Ryan O'Byrne	D	Cornell
Keith McWilliams	D	Rensselaer
Nick Dodge	F	Clarkson
Grant Goeckner-Zoeller	F	Princeton
Kevin Croxton	F	Rensselaer
Kevin Du	F	Harvard

2006–07
Player	Pos	Team
	G	
Ben Lovejoy	D	Dartmouth
Jake Luthise	D	Rensselaer
Sean Backman	F	Yale
Byron Bitz	F	Cornell
Brandon Wong	F	Quinnipiac

2007–08
Player	Pos	Team
Mark Dekanich	G	Colgate
Alex Biega	D	Harvard
Evan Stephens	D	Dartmouth
Sean Backman	F	Yale
Matt Beca	F	Clarkson
Jesse Winchester	F	Colgate

2008–09
Player	Pos	Team
Alec Richards	G	Yale
Alex Biega	D	Harvard
Jody Peterson	D	Princeton
Brock McBride	F	St. Lawrence
Broc Little	F	Yale
Adam Presizniuk	F	Union

==== 2010s ====
2009–10
Player	Pos	Team
Keith Kinkaid	G	Union
Derek Keller	D	St. Lawrence
Evan Stephens	D	Dartmouth
Riley Nash	F	Cornell
Aaron Volpatti	F	Brown
Travis Vermeulen	F	St. Lawrence

2010–11
Player	Pos	Team
Allen York	G	Rensselaer
Mike Devin	D	Cornell
Joe Stejskal	D	Dartmouth
Andrew Calof	F	Princeton
Chris Cahill	F	Yale
Jeremy Welsh	F	Union

2011–12
Player	Pos	Team
Paul Karpowich	G	Clarkson
Thomas Larkin	D	Colgate
Patrick McNally	D	Harvard
Connor Jones	F	Quinnipiac
Kyle Flanagan	F	St. Lawrence
Kelly Zajac	F	Union

2012–13
Player	Pos	Team
Anthony Borelli	G	Brown
Mathew Bodie	D	Union
Zach Davies	D	Quinnipiac
Daniel Carr	F	Union
Jeremy Langlois	F	Quinnipiac
Greg Miller	F	Cornell

2013–14
Player	Pos	Team
Charlie Finn	G	Colgate
Dennis Robertson	D	Brown
Spiro Goulakos	D	Colgate
Brian Ferlin	F	Cornell
Daniel Ciampini	F	Union
Kenny Agostino	F	Yale

2014–15
Player	Pos	Team
Michael Garteig	G	Quinnipiac
Jeff Taylor	D	Union
Danny Federico	D	Quinnipiac
Cole Bardreau	F	Cornell
Tyson Spink	F	Colgate
Kyle Baun	F	Colgate

2015–16
Player	Pos	Team
Michael Garteig	G	Quinnipiac
Joakim Ryan	D	Cornell
James De Haas	D	Clarkson
Alexander Kerfoot	F	Harvard
Mike Vecchione	F	Union
Tyson Spink	F	Colgate

2016–17
Player	Pos	Team
Merrick Madsen	G	Harvard
Chase Priskie	D	Quinnipiac
Jake Kulevich	D	Colgate
Sam Vineault	F	Clarkson
Sam Lafferty	F	Brown
Troy Crema	F	Dartmouth

2017–18
Player	Pos	Team
Jake Kupsky	G	Union
Jake Kielly	G	Clarkson
Yanni Kaldis	D	Cornell
Josh Teves	D	Princeton
Odeen Tufto	F	Quinnipiac
Nico Sturm	F	Clarkson
Ryan Scarfo	F	Union

2018–19
Player	Pos	Team
Matthew Galajda	G	Cornell
Josh Teves	D	Princeton
Reilly Walsh	D	Harvard
Cam Donaldson	F	Cornell
Cole Maier	F	Union
Bobby McMann	F	Colgate

==== 2020s ====
2019–20
Player	Pos	Team
Matthew Galajda	G	Cornell
Peter DiLiberatore	D	Quinnipiac
Alex Green	D	Cornell
Devin Brosseau	F	Clarkson
Josh Dunne	F	Clarkson
Haralds Egle	F	Clarkson

2020–21
No team named

2021–22
Player	Pos	Team
Clay Stevenson	G	Dartmouth
Brandon Estes	D	Union
Lukas Kälble	D	Clarkson
Alex Laferriere	F	Harvard
Max Andreev	F	Cornell
Wyatt Bongiovanni	F	Quinnipiac

2022–23
Player	Pos	Team
Mathieu Caron	G	Brown
Noah Beck	D	Clarkson
Tanner Palocsik	D	Dartmouth
Ayrton Martino	F	Clarkson
Mathieu Gosselin	F	Clarkson
Skyler Brind'Amour	F	Quinnipiac

2023–24
Player	Pos	Team
Vinny Duplessis	G	Quinnipiac
Ben Robertson	D	Cornell
C. J. Foley	D	Dartmouth
Dalton Bancroft	F	Cornell
Joe Miller	F	Harvard
Mathieu Gosselin	F	Clarkson

2024–25
Player	Pos	Team
Kyle Chauvette	G	Union
John Prokop	D	Union
Tim Rego	D	Cornell
Brandon Buhr	F	Union
Brendan Gorman	F	Princeton
Tyler Kopff	F	Brown

2025–26
Player	Pos	Team
Arthur Smith	G	Princeton
C. J. Foley	D	Dartmouth
Matthew Morden	D	Harvard
Kai Daniells	F	Princeton
Mason Marcellus	F	Quinnipiac
Ryan Bottrill	F	Clarkson

==== Third Team players by school ====
School	Winners
Cornell	17
Clarkson	16
Union	16
Quinnipiac	14
Colgate	10
Harvard	10
Dartmouth	9
Princeton	9
Brown	6
Yale	6
Rensselaer	4
St. Lawrence	4

==== Multiple appearances ====
Player	Third Team appearances
Sean Backman	2
Alex Biega	2
C. J. Foley	2
Matthew Galajda	2
Michael Garteig	2
Mathieu Gosselin	2
Tyson Spink	2
Evan Stephens	2
Josh Teves	2

=== Rookie Team ===
==== 1980s ====
1987–88
Player	Pos	Team
Corrie D'Alessio	G	Cornell
Mark Salsbury	G	Princeton
Andy Cesarski	D	Princeton
Steve Poapst	D	Colgate
Dave Tretowicz	D	Clarkson
Stephane Venne	D	Vermont
Trent Andison	F	Cornell
Peter Ciavaglia	F	Harvard
Bruce Coles	F	Rensselaer
Joé Juneau	F	Rensselaer
John LeClair	F	Vermont
Rob Tobin	F	Army

1988–89
Player	Pos	Team
Chuckie Hughes	G	Harvard
Allain Roy	G	Harvard
Mike McKee	D	Princeton
Dan Ratushny	D	Cornell
Shawn Rivers	D	St. Lawrence
Kevin Sneddon	D	Harvard
Dale Band	F	Colgate
Jeff Blaeser	F	Yale
Jamie Cooke	F	Colgate
Andre Faust	F	Princeton
Craig Ferguson	F	Yale
Jim Larkin	F	Vermont

==== 1990s ====
1989–90
Player	Pos	Team
Bob Haddock	D	Colgate
Allen Kummu	D	Rensselaer
Aaron Miller	D	Vermont
Mike Ross	F	Brown
Hugo Belanger	F	Clarkson
Scott Thomas	F	Clarkson
Ryan Hughes	F	Cornell
Kent Manderville	F	Cornell
Ted Drury	F	Harvard
Francois Cadoret	F	Rensselaer
Greg Carvel	F	St. Lawrence
Mark Kaufmann	F	Yale

1990–91
Player	Pos	Team
Geoff Finch	G	Brown
Mike Bracco	G	Dartmouth
Neil Little	G	Rensselaer
Ed Henrich	D	Clarkson
Derek Maguire	D	Harvard
Sean McCann	D	Harvard
Mike McCourt	D	St. Lawrence
Craig Conroy	F	Clarkson
Tony DelCarmine	F	Dartmouth
Scott Fraser	F	Dartmouth
Rob Laferriere	F	Princeton
Eric Lacroix	F	St. Lawrence
Martin Leroux	F	Yale

1991–92
Player	Pos	Team
Christian Soucy	G	Vermont
Luigi Villa	G	Union
Brad Dexter	D	Colgate
Brian Mueller	D	Clarkson
Mike Traggio	F	Brown
Wayne Clarke	F	Rensselaer
Ben Coughlin	F	Harvard
Dominique Ducharme	F	Vermont
Ron Fogarty	F	Colgate
Craig Hamelin	F	Rensselaer
Brad Konik	F	Harvard
Todd Marchant	F	Clarkson
Steve Martins	F	Harvard
Patrice Robitaille	F	Clarkson
Marko Tuomainen	F	Clarkson
Pat Turcotte	F	Dartmouth

1992–93
Player	Pos	Team
Aaron Israel	G	Harvard
Tripp Tracy	G	Harvard
Dan Brierley	D	Yale
Jeff Kungle	D	St. Lawrence
Reid Simonton	D	Union
Jason Smith	D	Princeton
Matt Johnson	F	Vermont
Bill Kelleher	F	Dartmouth
Ryan Mulhern	F	Brown
Burke Murphy	F	St. Lawrence
Tim Regan	F	Rensselaer
Bryan Richardson	F	Rensselaer

1993–94
Player	Pos	Team
Tim Thomas	G	Vermont
Troy Creurer	D	St. Lawrence
Ashlin Halfnight	D	Harvard
Adam Wiesel	D	Clarkson
Steve Wilson	D	Cornell
Vince Auger	F	Cornell
Chris Ford	F	Union
Mike Harder	F	Colgate
Jean-François Houle	F	Clarkson
Éric Perrin	F	Vermont
Martin St. Louis	F	Vermont
Troy Stevens	F	Union

1994–95
Player	Pos	Team
Dan Brenzavich	G	Colgate
Trevor Koenig	G	Union
Dan Murphy	G	Clarkson
Jimmy Andersson	D	Brown
Chris Clark	F	Clarkson
Paul DiFrancesco	F	St. Lawrence
Eric Healey	F	Rensselaer
Tim Loftsgard	F	Colgate
Casson Masters	F	Princeton
Ryan Smart	F	Cornell
David Whitworth	F	Dartmouth

1995–96
Player	Pos	Team
Leeor Shtrom	G	Union
Jan Kloboucek	D	Vermont
Mikko Ollila	D	Clarkson
John Poapst	D	St. Lawrence
Ben Storey	D	Harvard
Craig Adams	F	Harvard
Matt Garver	F	Rensselaer
Kyle Knopp	F	Cornell
Craig MacDonald	F	Harvard
Brent Ozarowski	F	Union
Alain St. Hilaire	F	Rensselaer

1996–97
Player	Pos	Team
J. R. Prestifilippo	G	Harvard
Dominique Auger	D	Princeton
Ryan Campbell	F	Union
Pete Gardiner	F	Rensselaer
Jeff Hamilton	F	Yale
Ryan Moynihan	F	Cornell

1997–98
Player	Pos	Team
Andrew Allen	G	Vermont
Cory Murphy	D	Colgate
Andreas Moborg	D	Vermont
Willie Mitchell	D	Clarkson
Steve Moore	F	Harvard
Erik Cole	F	Clarkson
Chris Bala	F	Harvard

1998–99
Player	Pos	Team
Shawn Grant	G	Clarkson
Kerry Ellis-Toddington	D	Clarkson
Ray DiLauro	D	St. Lawrence
Denis Ladouceur	F	Cornell
Jamie Herrington	F	Dartmouth
Matt Murley	F	Rensselaer
Brandon Dietrich	F	St. Lawrence

==== 2000s ====
1999–00
Player	Pos	Team
Derek Gustafson	G	St. Lawrence
Trevor Byrne	D	Dartmouth
Mark McRae	D	Cornell
Dominic Moore	F	Harvard
Marc Cavosie	F	Rensselaer
Matt McRae	F	Cornell

2000–01
Player	Pos	Team
Nathan Marsters	G	Rensselaer
Jeff Dwyer	D	Yale
Rob Brown	D	Colgate
Patrick Sharp	F	Vermont
Rob McFeeters	F	Clarkson
Tim Pettit	F	Harvard

2001–02
Player	Pos	Team
David LeNeveu	G	Cornell
Randy Jones	D	Clarkson
Noah Welch	D	Harvard
Chris Higgins	F	Yale
Jordan Webb	F	Union
Lee Stempniak	F	Dartmouth

2002–03
Player	Pos	Team
Kris Mayotte	G	Union
Sean Offers	D	Dartmouth
Jaime Sifers	D	Vermont
Kevin Croxton	F	Rensselaer
Hugh Jessiman	F	Dartmouth
John Zeiler	F	St. Lawrence

2003–04
Player	Pos	Team
David McKee	G	Cornell
Grant Lewis	D	Dartmouth
Mike Campaner	D	Colgate
Brian Ihnacak	F	Brown
Kyle Rank	F	St. Lawrence
Oren Eizenman	F	Rensselaer

2004–05
Player	Pos	Team
Joe Fallon	G	Vermont
Sean Hurley	D	Brown
Sasha Pokulok	D	Cornell
Tyler Burton	F	Colgate
Nick Johnson	F	Dartmouth
Torrey Mitchell	F	Vermont

2005–06
Player	Pos	Team
Mathias Lange	G	Rensselaer
Matt Generous	D	St. Lawrence
Nick St. Pierre	D	Colgate
Bryan Leitch	F	Quinnipiac
Shea Guthrie	F	Clarkson
Brett Wilson	F	Princeton

2006–07
Player	Pos	Team
Alex Petizian	G	St. Lawrence
Alex Biega	D	Harvard
Brendon Nash	D	Cornell
Sean Backman	F	Yale
TJ Galiardi	F	Dartmouth
Brandon Wong	F	Quinnipiac

2007–08
Player	Pos	Team
Corey Milan	G	Union
Mike Devin	D	Cornell
Evan Stephens	D	Dartmouth
Riley Nash	F	Cornell
Chase Polacek	F	Rensselaer
Adam Presizniuk	F	Union

2008–09
Player	Pos	Team
Jody O'Neill	G	Dartmouth
Jeff Buvinow	D	Brown
Keir Ross	D	Cornell
Patrick Cullen	F	Rensselaer
Doug Jones	F	Dartmouth
Brian O'Neill	F	Yale

==== 2010s ====
2009–10
Player	Pos	Team
Keith Kinkaid	G	Union
George Hughes	D	St. Lawrence
Nick D'Agostino	D	Cornell
Jerry D'Amigo	F	Rensselaer
Brandon Pirri	F	Rensselaer
Louis Leblanc	F	Harvard

2010–11
Player	Pos	Team
Andy Iles	G	Cornell
Mathew Bodie	D	Union
Dennis Robertson	D	Brown
Andrew Calof	F	Princeton
Greg Carey	F	St. Lawrence
Daniel Carr	F	Union

2011–12
Player	Pos	Team
Steve Michalek	G	Harvard
Patrick McNally	D	Harvard
Shayne Gostisbehere	D	Union
Matthew Peca	F	Quinnipiac
Brian Ferlin	F	Cornell
Chris Martin	F	St. Lawrence

2012–13
Player	Pos	Team
Jason Kasdorf	G	Rensselaer
Paul Geiger	D	Clarkson
Ryan Obuchowski	D	Yale
Kyle Baun	F	Colgate
Tylor Spink	F	Colgate
Jimmy Vesey	F	Harvard

2013–14
Player	Pos	Team
Charlie Finn	G	Colgate
James de Haas	D	Clarkson
Gavin Bayreuther	D	St. Lawrence
Mike Vecchione	F	Union
Matt Carey	F	St. Lawrence
Sam Anas	F	Quinnipiac

2014–15
Player	Pos	Team
Kyle Hayton	G	St. Lawrence
Kyle Summers	D	Clarkson
Nolan Gluchowski	D	St. Lawrence
Spencer Foo	F	Union
Drew Melanson	F	Rensselaer
Landon Smith	F	Quinnipiac

2015–16
Player	Pos	Team
Cam Hackett	G	Rensselaer
Chase Priskie	D	Quinnipiac
Max Gottlieb	D	Brown
Ryan Kuffner	F	Princeton
Tommy Marchin	F	Brown
Joe Snively	F	Yale

2016–17
Player	Pos	Team
Jake Kielly	G	Clarkson
Yanni Kaldis	D	Cornell
Adam Fox	D	Harvard
Jackson Cressey	F	Princeton
Sheldon Rempal	F	Clarkson
Nico Sturm	F	Clarkson

2017–18
Player	Pos	Team
Matthew Galajda	G	Cornell
Nick Austin	D	Colgate
Reilly Walsh	D	Harvard
Odeen Tufto	F	Quinnipiac
Jack Jacome	F	Clarkson
Jack Baldini	F	Harvard

2018–19
Player	Pos	Team
Owen Savory	G	Rensselaer
Peter DiLiberatore	D	Quinnipiac
Jack Rathbone	D	Harvard
Wyatt Bongiovanni	F	Quinnipiac
Casey Dornbach	F	Harvard
Jack Drury	F	Harvard

==== 2020s ====
2019–20
Player	Pos	Team
Mitchell Gibson	G	Harvard
Dylan Anhorn	D	Union
Henry Thrun	D	Harvard
Nick Abruzzese	F	Harvard
John Farinacci	F	Harvard
Gabriel Seger	F	Union

2020–21
Player	Pos	Team
Ethan Haider	G	Clarkson
Pierson Brandon	D	Colgate
Luc Salem	D	St. Lawrence
Ty Smilanic	F	Quinnipiac
Alex Young	F	Colgate
Greg Lapointe	F	St. Lawrence

2021–22
Player	Pos	Team
Clay Stevenson	G	Dartmouth
Ian Moore	D	Harvard
Hank Kempf	D	Cornell
Alex Laferriere	F	Harvard
Ayrton Martino	F	Clarkson
Matthew Coronato	F	Harvard

2022–23
Player	Pos	Team
Cooper Black	G	Dartmouth
John Prokop	D	Union
Ryan Healey	D	Harvard
Sam Lipkin	F	Quinnipiac
Joe Miller	F	Harvard
Sutter Muzzatti	F	Rensselaer

2023–24
Player	Pos	Team
Jack Stark	G	Yale
C. J. Foley	D	Dartmouth
Ben Robertson	D	Cornell
Mason Marcellus	F	Quinnipiac
Jonathan Castagna	F	Cornell
Jake Schneider	F	Colgate

2024–25
Player	Pos	Team
Ben Charette	G	Harvard
Michael Neumeier	D	Colgate
Tate Taylor	D	Clarkson
Ben Muthersbaugh	F	Union
Brian Nicholas	F	Brown
Mick Thompson	F	Harvard

2025–26
Player	Pos	Team
Alexis Cournoyer	G	Cornell
Thomas Klassek	D	Rensselaer
Xavier Veilleux	D	Cornell
Ethan Wyttenbach	F	Quinnipiac
Antonin Verreault	F	Quinnipiac
Rasmus Svartstrom	F	St. Lawrence

==== Rookie Team players by school ====
School	Winners
Harvard	44
Clarkson	31
Cornell	30
Rensselaer	29
St. Lawrence	26
Colgate	22
Union	22
Dartmouth	20
Vermont	17
Quinnipiac	14
Yale	13
Brown	12
Princeton	12
Army	1

== See also ==
- ECAC Hockey Awards
