= Dale Band =

Canadian ice hockey player

- Born: June 30, 1969 (age 57) Kanata, Ontario, Canada
- Height: 5 ft 10 in (178 cm)
- Weight: 180 lb (82 kg; 12 st 12 lb)
- Position: Center
- Played for: Colgate
- Playing career: 1988–1992

Dale Band (born June 30, 1969) is a Canadian retired ice hockey center who was an All-American for Colgate.

== Career ==
Band joined the program at Colgate University in 1988 after a junior career with the Gloucester Rangers. He was nearly a point-per-game player as a freshman and was named to the ECAC All-Rookie team. In his sophomore season, Band helped the Raiders put together the best season in program history. The team won 30 games for the first time and reached the NCAA championship game. The team declined the following year but Band's scoring production spiked. For his senior season, Band was named team captain and led the team through a difficult season. He held the team together after their head coach, Terry Slater died due to a stroke in December. Despite the tragedy, Colgate finished out the year with Band being named an All-American. He retired from the game following his graduation.

== Statistics ==
=== Regular season and playoffs ===
			Regular Season					Playoffs
Season	Team	League	GP	G	A	Pts	PIM	GP	G	A	Pts	PIM
1986–87	Gloucester Rangers	CJHL	34	16	34	50	65	12	10	8	18	16
1987–88	Gloucester Rangers	CJHL	52	55	60	115	102	—	—	—	—	—
1988–89	Colgate	ECAC Hockey	31	9	21	30	20	—	—	—	—	—
1989–90	Colgate	ECAC Hockey	37	12	24	36	24	—	—	—	—	—
1990–91	Colgate	ECAC Hockey	32	16	34	50	22	—	—	—	—	—
1991–92	Colgate	ECAC Hockey	28	13	40	53	20	—	—	—	—	—
CJHL totals			86	71	94	165	167	12	10	8	18	16
NCAA totals			128	50	119	169	86	—	—	—	—	—

== Awards and honors ==
Award	Year
CJHL First–Team All–Star	1987–88
All-ECAC Hockey Rookie Team	1988–89
All-ECAC Hockey First Team	1991–92
AHCA East Second-Team All-American	1991–92
