= Steve Smith (ice hockey, born 1962) =

Canadian ice hockey player

- Born: 1962 (age 63–64) Peterborough, Ontario, Canada
- Height: 5 ft 9 in (175 cm)
- Weight: 163 lb (74 kg; 11 st 9 lb)
- Position: Center
- Played for: Colgate; HC Varese; SaiPa; SV Ritten
- Playing career: 1980–1988
- Coaching career

Biographical details
- Education: Colgate

Coaching career (HC unless noted)
- 1997–2003: Peterborough Petes (assiatant)
- 2003–2004: Windsor Spitfires
- 2005–Present: New Jersey Devils (scout)

Head coaching record
- Overall: 27–30–3 (.475)

Steven A. Smith (born 1962) is a Canadian ice hockey scout and former center who was an All-American for Colgate.

== Career ==
Smith played junior hockey in his home town of Peterborough. Despite spending 5 games with the Peterborough Petes, he retained his college eligibility and began attending Colgate university in the fall of 1980. Smith arrived just as the Red Raiders were becoming a good team and helped the program post its first ever 20-win season. Smith was a major contributor that season, finishing 3rd in team scoring and would continue his high offensive production for his entire college career.

After the auspicious debut, the team declined a bit and Smith would never reach a second NCAA Tournament but he was counted on to lead the team. He was named team captain as a junior and held the role for two seasons, managing to lift the team to a second 20-win season in 1984. That Year he was named as an All-American but the team was middle-of-the-pack in ECAC Hockey and lost to a very strong Rensselaer squad in the ECAC Tournament. Despite the lack of playoff success, Smith finished his career as the all time leader for assists and points for the program and was the first Raider to top 200 points for a career. He was eventually surpassed in points but still sits second (first in points per game) as of 2021.

After graduating, Smith continued his playing career in Europe, first with HC Varese. A stellar season led to him signing with SaiPa but his results in SM-liiga weren't as impressive. He returned to the Italy, playing for new entry, SV Ritten. After helping the club stave off relegation once, he was unable to accomplish the feat a second time and retired after the team was demoted to Series B in 1988.

After he was inducted into the Colgate Ring of Honor, Smith became an assistant coach for the Petes in 1997. After six years he left to take over as head coach for the Windsor Spitfires in 2003 (with Mike Kelly). Smith lasted just one season before resigning and then became a scout for the New Jersey Devils after the NHL returned from the lockout, a role he continues with as of 2021.

== Statistics ==
=== Regular season and playoffs ===
			Regular Season					Playoffs
Season	Team	League	GP	G	A	Pts	PIM	GP	G	A	Pts	PIM
1979–80	Peterborough Oilers	MJBHL	38	34	46	80	6	—	—	—	—	—
1979–80	Peterborough Petes	OHA	5	0	3	3	0	—	—	—	—	—
1980–81	Colgate	ECAC Hockey	33	23	30	53	10	—	—	—	—	—
1981–82	Colgate	ECAC Hockey	30	16	38	54	10	—	—	—	—	—
1982–83	Colgate	ECAC Hockey	28	15	30	45	4	—	—	—	—	—
1983–84	Colgate	ECAC Hockey	35	29	31	60	12	—	—	—	—	—
1984–85	AS Varese Hockey	Serie A	33	36	38	74	8	—	—	—	—	—
1985–86	SaiPa Lappeenranta	SM-liiga	35	6	7	13	10	—	—	—	—	—
1986–87	SV Ritten	Serie A	40	49	45	94	12	—	—	—	—	—
1987–88	SV Ritten	Serie A	36	34	26	60	4	—	—	—	—	—
NCAA totals			126	83	129	212	36	—	—	—	—	—
Serie A totals			109	119	109	228	24	—	—	—	—	—

== Awards and honors ==
Award	Year
All-ECAC Hockey First Team	1983–84
AHCA East First-Team All-American	1983–84
