= David Baseggio =

Canadian ice hockey player and coach

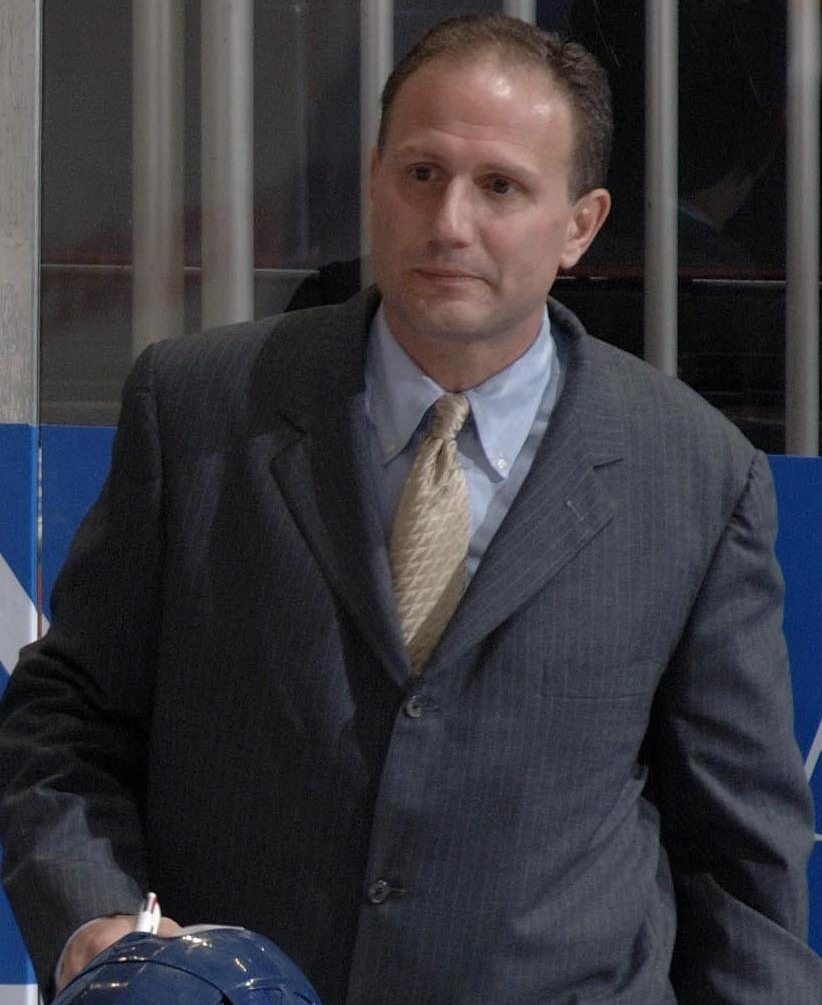
- Baseggio in 2006
- Born: October 28, 1967 (age 58) Niagara Falls, Ontario, Canada
- Height: 6 ft 0 in (183 cm)
- Weight: 194 lb (88 kg; 13 st 12 lb)
- Position: Defence
- Shot: Left
- Played for: AHL; Rochester Americans; New Haven Nighthawks; Worcester IceCats; IHL; Indianapolis Ice; Detroit Vipers; Cleveland Lumberjacks; Houston Aeros; Grand Rapids Griffins; Italy; Bolzano HC
- NHL draft: 68th overall, 1986; Buffalo Sabres
- Playing career: 1989–2000

David Baseggio (born October 28, 1967) is a Canadian former professional ice hockey defenceman and coach. Baseggio was selected by the Buffalo Sabres in the fourth round (68th overall) of the 1986 NHL entry draft. He is currently employed as the director of pro scouting for the Seattle Kraken of the National Hockey League.

Born in 1967 in Niagara Falls, Ontario, Baseggio attended Yale University, where he played four seasons of NCAA Division I college hockey with the Yale Bulldogs men's ice hockey team. He began to play professionally in 1989, and went on the play 619 games in a career that spanned eleven seasons in the American Hockey League, International Hockey League, and Europe. Baseggio retired as a player following the 1999–2000 ECHL season to become an assistant coach with the 2000–01 Charlotte Checkers of the ECHL.

For the 2001-02 AHL season, he joined the Bridgeport Sound Tigers as an assistant coach and he was named the head coach of the Sound Tigers prior to the 2005-06 AHL season. Baseggio was then named head coach of the Peoria Rivermen in the American Hockey League starting the 2006-07 AHL season, where he remained for two seasons. His career then took him to the Anaheim Ducks organization in the National Hockey League, serving at a pro scout starting in the 2008-09 season, before taking on responsibilities as pro scouting director and assistant to the general manager. In July 2020, Baseggio joined the Seattle Kraken as the team's pro scouting director.

== Career statistics ==
			Regular season					Playoffs
Season	Team	League	GP	G	A	Pts	PIM	GP	G	A	Pts	PIM
1985–86	Yale University	NCAA	30	7	17	24	54	—	—	—	—	—
1986–87	Yale University	NCAA	29	8	17	25	52	—	—	—	—	—
1987–88	Yale University	NCAA	24	4	22	26	67	—	—	—	—	—
1988–89	Yale University	NCAA	28	10	23	33	41	—	—	—	—	—
1989–90	Indianapolis Ice	IHL	10	1	7	8	2	—	—	—	—	—
1989–90	Rochester Americans	AHL	41	3	15	18	41	—	—	—	—	—
1990–91	Rochester Americans	AHL	35	3	13	16	32	—	—	—	—	—
1991–92	Rochester Americans	AHL	29	5	11	16	14	—	—	—	—	—
1991–92	New Haven Nighthawks	AHL	31	3	19	22	8	3	0	0	0	2
1992–93	SC Lyss	NLB	35	12	13	25	131	—	—	—	—	—
1993–94	HC Bolzano	Italy	29	12	18	30	44	—	—	—	—	—
1994–95	Detroit Vipers	IHL	1	0	0	0	0	—	—	—	—	—
1994–95	Worcester IceCats	AHL	72	10	28	38	38	—	—	—	—	—
1995–96	Cleveland Lumberjacks	IHL	76	8	33	41	100	3	0	2	2	6
1996–97	Cleveland Lumberjacks	IHL	4	0	0	0	0	—	—	—	—	—
1996–97	Houston Aeros	IHL	76	13	33	46	44	13	3	7	10	8
1997–98	Cleveland Lumberjacks	IHL	62	11	27	38	70	10	1	6	7	6
1998–99	Cleveland Lumberjacks	IHL	55	12	30	42	72	—	—	—	—	—
1999–00	Detroit Vipers	IHL	48	5	21	26	28	—	—	—	—	—
1999–00	Grand Rapids Griffins	IHL	15	0	7	7	6	—	—	—	—	—
AHL totals			208	24	86	110	133	3	0	0	0	2
IHL totals			347	50	158	208	322	26	4	15	19	20

== Awards and honors ==
Award	Year
All-ECAC Hockey Second Team	1986–87
All-ECAC Hockey Second Team	1988–89
