= Réjean Boivin =

Canadian ice hockey player

- Born: August 24, 1966 (age 59) Sainte-Foy, Quebec, Canada
- Height: 5 ft 8 in (173 cm)
- Weight: 165 lb (75 kg; 11 st 11 lb)
- Position: Right Wing
- Shot: Right
- Played for: Colgate; Ässät
- Playing career: 1984–1989

Réjean Boivin is a Canadian retired ice hockey right wing who was an All-American for Colgate.

== Career ==
Boivin was a star player for Colgate for four seasons. As a freshman and sophomore, he finished second on the team in scoring and helped the Red Raiders climb out of the ECAC Hockey cellar. He was named team captain prior to his junior year and led the team to its best season, setting a program record for wins with 23. Unfortunately, the team was still unable to do much in the postseason and were upset in the conference quarterfinals. The Raiders regressed in Boivin's senior season, but he was named an All-American for being one of the top goal-scorers in the nation, averaging one goal per game.

After graduating, Boivin spent one season playing professionally in Finland before retiring. He was inducted into Colgate's Athletic Hall of Fame in 2011.

== Statistics ==
=== Regular season and playoffs ===
			Regular Season					Playoffs
Season	Team	League	GP	G	A	Pts	PIM	GP	G	A	Pts	PIM
1981–82	Sainte-Foy Gouverneurs	QMAAA	41	9	21	30	14	—	—	—	—	—
1982–83	Sainte-Foy Gouverneurs	QMAAA	42	50	57	107	0	5	1	6	7	0
1984–85	Colgate	ECAC Hockey	32	10	18	28	24	—	—	—	—	—
1985–86	Colgate	ECAC Hockey	32	26	20	46	6	—	—	—	—	—
1986–87	Colgate	ECAC Hockey	33	19	28	47	18	—	—	—	—	—
1987–88	Colgate	ECAC Hockey	31	31	21	52	12	—	—	—	—	—
1988–89	Ässät	SM-liiga	38	18	14	32	19	—	—	—	—	—
NCAA totals			128	86	87	173	60	—	—	—	—	—

== Awards and honors ==
Award	Year
All-ECAC Hockey First Team	1987–88
AHCA East First-Team All-American	1987–88
