= Jim Wiemer =

Canadian ice hockey player

- Born: January 9, 1961 (age 65) Sudbury, Ontario, Canada
- Height: 6 ft 4 in (193 cm)
- Weight: 200 lb (91 kg; 14 st 4 lb)
- Position: Defence
- Shot: Left
- Played for: Buffalo Sabres; New York Rangers; Edmonton Oilers; Los Angeles Kings; Boston Bruins
- NHL draft: 83rd overall, 1980; Buffalo Sabres
- Playing career: 1981–1995

James Duncan Wiemer (born January 9, 1961) is a Canadian former professional ice hockey defenceman who played for the Buffalo Sabres, New York Rangers, Edmonton Oilers, Los Angeles Kings and Boston Bruins in the National Hockey League (NHL) between 1983 and 1993.

== Early life ==
Wiemer was born on January 9, 1961, in Sudbury, Ontario, Canada. He is of German descent as his grandfather fought with the Germans during World War II before moving to North Bay, Ontario in the 1950s.

== Hockey career ==
Wiemer began his path to the pros in Peterborough, Ontario with the Peterborough Petes of the Ontario Hockey League in 1978. He helped his team to the 1979 Memorial Cup Championship and continued his playing career in Peterborough until the end of the 1980–81 OHL season. Wiemer had his most productive season in 1980–81 when he recorded 95 points on 41 goals and 54 assists. During his tenure there, he was selected in the 1980 NHL entry draft by the Buffalo Sabres with the 83rd pick in the fourth round.

Wiemer began his professional career with the Rochester Americans of the American Hockey League (AHL) under coach Mike Keenan. He was originally drafted as a forward and was later moved back to defence by Keenan. He was an integral part in the 1983 Calder Cup Championship run.

Wiemer began his National Hockey League career and began to bounce around a bit to the aforementioned teams. He experienced his first trade in the NHL on December 6, 1984, when the Sabres traded Wiemer and Steve Patrick to the New York Rangers in exchange for Chris Renaud and Dave Maloney.

In 1986, he was traded by the Rangers to the Edmonton Oilers. In the 1987–88 season, Wiemer played 12 regular season games, and two games in the Conference Finals playoff for the Oilers, and has a Stanley Cup Ring. However, his name was not included on the Stanley Cup. The criteria to get your name on the cup is to play 40 or more games for the winning team during the regular season, and/or one game played in the Stanley Finals. After playing mostly for the Oilers' farm team in the AHL the next season, he was traded to the Los Angeles Kings in March 1989.

In July 1989, Wiemer signed as a free agent with the Boston Bruins where he found a solid home. Under coach Mike Milbury, Wiemer was a solid fixture on the blueline with Boston for the better part of four seasons. Wiemer was a member of the Bruins' organization for one more season with their AHL team. In 1994, Wiemer returned to the Rochester Americans for his final season.

Wiemer finished his playing career with 325 games played in the NHL (387 including playoffs). He scored 101 (114 including playoffs) points in his NHL career on 29 goals and 72 assists (34 and 80 including playoffs) with 378 penalty minutes and a plus/minus of +17 (437 and +14 including playoffs).

== Career statistics ==
=== Regular season and playoffs ===
			Regular season					Playoffs
Season	Team	League	GP	G	A	Pts	PIM	GP	G	A	Pts	PIM
1977–78	Sudbury Nickel Capitals	GNML	90	50	50	100	175	—	—	—	—	—
1978–79	Peterborough Petes	OMJHL	61	15	12	27	50	18	4	4	8	15
1978–79	Peterborough Petes	M-Cup	—	—	—	—	—	5	2	1	3	0
1979–80	Peterborough Petes	OMJHL	53	17	32	49	63	14	6	9	15	19
1979–80	Peterborough Petes	M-Cup	—	—	—	—	—	5	0	0	0	6
1980–81	Peterborough Petes	OHL	65	41	54	95	102	5	1	2	3	15
1981–82	Rochester Americans	AHL	74	19	26	45	57	9	0	4	4	2
1982–83	Buffalo Sabres	NHL	—	—	—	—	—	1	0	0	0	0
1982–83	Rochester Americans	AHL	74	15	44	59	43	15	5	15	20	22
1983–84	Buffalo Sabres	NHL	64	5	15	20	48	—	—	—	—	—
1983–84	Rochester Americans	AHL	12	4	11	15	11	18	3	13	16	20
1984–85	Buffalo Sabres	NHL	10	3	2	5	4	—	—	—	—	—
1984–85	Rochester Americans	AHL	13	1	9	10	24	—	—	—	—	—
1984–85	New York Rangers	NHL	22	4	3	7	30	1	0	0	0	0
1984–85	New Haven Nighthawks	AHL	33	9	27	36	39	—	—	—	—	—
1985–86	New York Rangers	NHL	7	3	0	3	2	8	1	0	1	6
1985–86	New Haven Nighthawks	AHL	73	24	49	73	108	—	—	—	—	—
1986–87	New Haven Nighthawks	AHL	6	0	7	7	6	—	—	—	—	—
1986–87	Nova Scotia Oilers	AHL	59	9	25	34	72	5	0	4	4	2
1987–88	Edmonton Oilers	NHL	12	1	2	3	15	2	0	0	0	2
1987–88	Nova Scotia Oilers	AHL	57	11	32	43	99	5	1	1	2	14
1988–89	Los Angeles Kings	NHL	9	2	3	5	20	10	2	1	3	19
1988–89	Cape Breton Oilers	AHL	51	12	29	41	80	—	—	—	—	—
1988–89	New Haven Nighthawks	AHL	3	1	1	2	2	7	2	3	5	2
1989–90	Boston Bruins	NHL	61	5	14	19	63	8	0	1	1	4
1989–90	Maine Mariners	AHL	6	3	4	7	27	—	—	—	—	—
1990–91	Boston Bruins	NHL	61	4	19	23	62	16	1	3	4	14
1991–92	Boston Bruins	NHL	47	1	8	9	84	15	1	3	4	14
1991–92	Maine Mariners	AHL	3	0	1	1	4	—	—	—	—	—
1992–93	Boston Bruins	NHL	28	1	6	7	48	1	0	0	0	4
1992–93	Providence Bruins	AHL	4	2	1	3	2	—	—	—	—	—
1993–94	Boston Bruins	NHL	4	0	0	0	2	—	—	—	—	—
1993–94	Providence Bruins	AHL	35	5	12	17	81	—	—	—	—	—
1994–95	Rochester Americans	AHL	6	3	4	7	27	—	—	—	—	—
AHL totals			548	124	307	431	729	64	11	42	53	68
NHL totals			325	29	72	101	378	62	5	8	13	63

=== International ===
Year	Team	Event	GP	G	A	Pts	PIM
1980	Canada	WJC	5	2	2	4	2
Junior totals			5	2	2	4	2

== Awards ==
- 1985–86 - Eddie Shore Award as the AHL's top defenceman.

In 2010, Wiemer was inducted into the Rochester Americans Hall of Fame along with former teammate Randy Cunneyworth and trainer Kent Weisbeck.

Jim Wiemer was inducted into the AHL Hall of Fame in 2026.
