= Nick St. Pierre =

Canadian ice hockey player

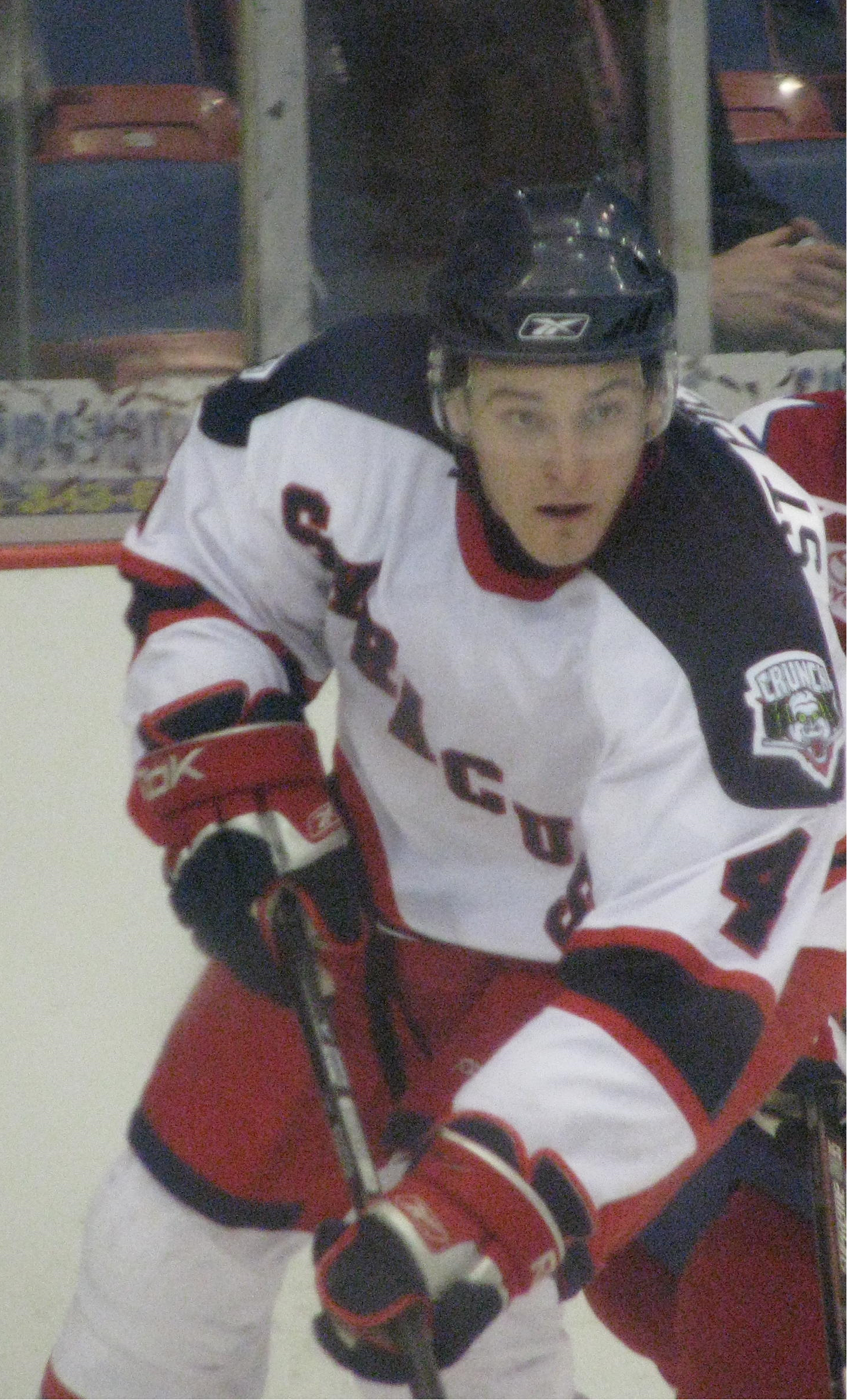
- Born: March 7, 1985 (age 40); Saint-Étienne, Quebec, Canada
- Height: 6 ft 0 in (183 cm)
- Weight: 185 lb (84 kg; 13 st 3 lb)
- Position: Defence
- Shoots: Left
- AL team Former teams: Tohoku Free Blades; Syracuse Crunch; Norfolk Admirals; HC Plzeň; Krefeld Pinguine; EC KAC
- NHL draft: Undrafted
- Playing career: 2009–present

Nicolas "Nick" St. Pierre (born March 7, 1985) is a Canadian professional ice hockey defenceman who is contracted with Tohoku Free Blades in Japan for the 2018-19 AL season. He most recently played with EC KAC of the Austrian Hockey League (EBEL). He played with HC Plzeň in the Czech Extraliga during the 2010–11 Czech Extraliga season.

After three seasons with Champions HC Plzeň, St. Pierre left for Germany, signing a one-year contract with Krefeld Pinguine of the Deutsche Eishockey Liga (DEL) on May 7, 2013.

== Awards and honours ==
Award	Year
College
All-ECAC Hockey Rookie Team	2006
ECAC All-Academic Team	2008, 2009
