= Chris Renaud (ice hockey) =

Canadian ice hockey player

- Born: April 25, 1960 (age 66) Windsor, Ontario, Canada
- Height: 5 ft 11 in (180 cm)
- Weight: 182 lb (83 kg; 13 st 0 lb)
- Position: Defence
- Played for: Tulsa Oilers; New Haven Nighthawks; Rochester Americans
- Playing career: 1982–1985

Chris Renaud (born April 25, 1960) is a Canadian former professional ice hockey defenceman.

He won the 1983–84 Central Hockey League (CHL) Championship as a member of the Tulsa Oilers team coached by Tom Webster.

== Playing career ==
Prior to turning pro, Renaud played four seasons (1978–1982) of NCAA hockey at Colgate University, earning All-America honors in the 1981/82 season.

After completing college, Renaud was signed to a professional contract with the New York Rangers of the National Hockey League. He was assigned to play with their top minor league affiliate, the Tulsa Oilers, in the CHL for the 1982–83 and 1983–84 seasons, where he won the Adams Cup. Following the collapse of the CHL, Renaud started the next season (1984–85) in the American Hockey League (AHL) with the New Haven Nighthawks. On December 6, 1984, the Rangers traded Renaud and Dave Maloney to the Buffalo Sabres in exchange for Steve Patrick and Jim Wiemer. As a result of this mid-season trade, Renaud played the remainder the 1984–85 season in the AHL with the Rochester Americans before retiring from professional hockey.

== Championships ==
Renaud was member of the Tulsa Oilers team that suspended operations on February 16, 1984, playing only road games for the final six weeks of the 1983–84 season. Despite this adversity, the team went on to capture the Adams Cup as the Central Hockey League's final champions.

== Awards and honours ==
Award	Year
All-ECAC Hockey Second Team	1980–81
All-ECAC Hockey First Team	1981–82
AHCA East All-American	1981–82
