= Tom Roe =

American ice hockey player (born 1934)

- Born: March 23, 1934 (age 92) Saint Paul, Minnesota, USA
- Height: 5 ft 11 in (180 cm)
- Weight: 185 lb (84 kg; 13 st 3 lb)
- Position: Center/Defenseman
- Played for: Williams
- National team: United States
- NHL draft: Undrafted
- Playing career: 1960–1965

Thomas Roe is an American retired ice hockey Center and Defenseman who was the NCAA Scoring Champion in 1962–63.

== Career ==
Roe was a three-year varsity player for Williams. His appearance on the team saw the Ephs jump from a 5–14 record up to a 16–4 mark, setting a program record for points in a season (67) along the way. Because Williams did not play a sufficiently strong schedule, however, the team was not in consideration for the NCAA Tournament. As a junior Roe led the nation in goal scoring with 49 and was named to the inaugural All-ECAC Second Team. Williams finished fourth in the conference with a 16–3–1 record but were not ranked in the top 8 and were left out of the ECAC Tournament. As a senior, Roe continued to score in bunches, finishing as the nation's top scorer, however, Williams' record declined to 13–9 and the team had no opportunity to demonstrate how good their best player was. Roe finished his college career as William's all-time leading scorer with a host of individual program records, many he still possesses (as of 2020).

After graduating, Roe joined the US National Team for the 1964–65 season. He participated in the 1965 Ice Hockey World Championships as a defenseman and scored three goals for a team that finished a disappointing 6th.

== Career statistics ==
=== Regular season and playoffs ===
			Regular Season					Playoffs
Season	Team	League	GP	G	A	Pts	PIM	GP	G	A	Pts	PIM
1960–61	Williams	NCAA	20	34	33	67	—	—	—	—	—	—
1961–62	Williams	ECAC Hockey	20	49	33	82	—	—	—	—	—	—
1962–63	Williams	ECAC Hockey	21	45	33	78	—	—	—	—	—	—
NCAA Totals			61	128	99	227	—	—	—	—	—	—

=== International ===
Year	Team		GP	G	A	Pts	PIM
1965	United States	WC	4	3	0	3	10

== Awards and honors ==
Award	Year
All-ECAC Hockey Second Team	1961–62
All-ECAC Hockey First Team	1962–63

Awards and achievements
Preceded by Ron Ryan	NCAA Ice Hockey Scoring Champion; 1962–63	Succeeded by Jerry Knightley
