= Richie Broadbelt =

Canadian ice hockey player

- Born: June 10, 1938 (age 88) Montreal, Quebec, Canada
- Height: 5 ft 9 in (175 cm)
- Weight: 160 lb (73 kg; 11 st 6 lb)
- Position: Goaltender
- Played for: St. Lawrence
- National team: Canada
- NHL draft: Undrafted
- Playing career: 1960–1964

Richard Brooks "Richie" Broadbelt is a Canadian retired ice hockey goaltender who was an All-American for St. Lawrence.

== Career ==
Broadbelt arrived in Canton in the fall of 1959 and, after a year with the freshman team, became the starting goaltender for the Saints. He helped St. Lawrence capture the Tri-State League championship that season and won the first national semifinal games for the Saints in their sixth attempt. Unfortunately, the 1961 Denver team was one of the most dominant squads in history and Broadbelt surrendered 12 goals on 50 shots in the title match.

The next season St. Lawrence joined with 27 other teams in forming ECAC Hockey and Broadbelt, one of the top goaltenders in the nation, led the team to the inaugural 1962 ECAC Tournament Championship. The win gave St. Lawrence another opportunity to win a championship, but the team reverted to form and lost both games to finish fourth in the tournament. Despite the last-place finish, Broadbelt was named as the best goaltender in the championship. For his final season, Broadbelt continued to improve and was named as both an All-American and First Team All-ECAC while setting program records for both goals against average and save percentage. St. Lawrence finished fourth in the conference but they could not improve their standing in the ECAC Tournament and lost the consolation game.

After graduating, Broadbelt spent a year with the Canadian national team but was not selected for the Olympic team. After retiring as a player, Broadbelt coached briefly, appearing as an assistant for Penn in 1970. Broadbelt was inducted into the St. Lawrence Athletic Hall of Fame in 2000.

== Statistics ==
=== Regular season and playoffs ===
			Regular season									Playoffs
Season	Team	League	GP	W	L	T	MIN	GA	SO	GAA	SV%	GP	W	L	MIN	GA	SO	GAA	SV%
1960–61	St. Lawrence	Tri-State League	12	—	—	—	720	47	1	3.92	.868	—	—	—	—	—	—	—	—
1961–62	St. Lawrence	ECAC Hockey	22	—	—	—	1350	64	2	2.84	.909	—	—	—	—	—	—	—	—
1962–63	St. Lawrence	ECAC Hockey	26	—	—	—	1525	62	4	2.44	.925	—	—	—	—	—	—	—	—
NCAA totals			60	42	16	2	3595	173	7	2.96	.908	—	—	—	—	—	—	—	—

== Awards and honors ==
Award	Year
All-ECAC Hockey Second Team	1961–62
ECAC Hockey All-Tournament Second Team	1962
NCAA All-Tournament First Team	1962
All-ECAC Hockey First Team	1962–63
AHCA East All-American	1962–63
