= Pat Brophy =

American ice hockey player

- Born: Pembroke, Ontario, Canada
- Height: 5 ft 9 in (175 cm)
- Weight: 165 lb (75 kg; 11 st 11 lb)
- Position: Defenseman
- Played for: Clarkson
- NHL draft: Undrafted
- Playing career: 1960–1963

Patrick Brophy is a Canadian retired ice hockey defenseman who was an All-American for Clarkson.

== Career ==
Brophy began attending Clarkson University in the fall of 1959. he joined the varsity hockey team the following year and helped the team to a 14–8 record. Prior to his junior season, Clarkson became a founding member of ECAC Hockey along with 27 other eastern teams. That season Brophy partnered with Cal Wagner to form one of the most impenetrable defensive pairs and Clarkson finished the season 3rd in the conference standings. The team received the top seed for the ECAC Tournament and marched all the way to the finals before being shocked by St. Lawrence. Brophy was named to the All-Tournament Second Team and, fortunately, because the conference possessed all of the teams that were considered for the National Tournament, the selection committee chose to invite Clarkson as the top eastern seed. The Golden Knights won their semifinal match against Michigan and made their first ever championship game, however, they were no match for Michigan Tech and were throttled 1–8.

In Brophy's senior season, Clarkson performed nearly as well as they had in 1962. The team finished second in their conference and Brophy's defensive acumen was recognized by his being named an All-American. Clarkson received a second seed for the conference tournament but fell to a very strong Harvard team in the semifinal. The Golden Knights won the consolation game and believed their season was over, however, the Ivy League schools were in the midst of an argument with the NCAA over player eligibility and Harvard declined the invitation to the NCAA tournament. As a result, Clarkson was offered the bid and the team accepted. Clarkson was unable to overcome Denver in the semifinal but did win the consolation game, ending their season on a high note.

== Career statistics ==
=== Regular season and playoffs ===
			Regular Season					Playoffs
Season	Team	League	GP	G	A	Pts	PIM	GP	G	A	Pts	PIM
1960–61	Clarkson	Tri-State League	21	5	7	12	—	—	—	—	—	—
1961–62	Clarkson	ECAC Hockey	26	4	10	14	—	—	—	—	—	—
1962–63	Clarkson	ECAC Hockey	23	2	11	13	—	—	—	—	—	—
NCAA Totals			70	11	28	39	—	—	—	—	—	—

== Awards and honors ==
Award	Year
All-ECAC Hockey Second Team	1961–62
ECAC Hockey All-Tournament Second Team	1962
All-ECAC Hockey First Team	1962–63
AHCA East All-American	1962–63
