= Cal Wagner =

Canadian ice hockey player

- Born: Pembroke, Ontario, Canada
- Height: 5 ft 10 in (178 cm)
- Weight: 190 lb (86 kg; 13 st 8 lb)
- Position: Defenseman
- Played for: Clarkson
- NHL draft: Undrafted
- Playing career: 1960–1963

Calvin "Barry" Wagner is a Canadian retired ice hockey defenseman who was an All-American for Clarkson.

== Career ==
Wagner was a three-year varsity player for Clarkson. He teamed up with fellow Pembroke native Pat Brophy to form a stout defensive pair for the Golden Knights and helped Clarkson finish near the top of the ECAC standings in final two seasons. Wagner helped his team reach the championship game in 1962 but the team was overwhelmed by Michigan Tech and lost the match 1–8. Wagner was named team captain for his senior season and led the Knights to a second-place finish. He was named an All-American for his defensive work and attempted to get the Golden Knights back into the NCAA Tournament. Clarkson received the second seed for the conference tournament but fell to a very strong Harvard team in the semifinal. The Golden Knights won the consolation game and believed their season was over, however, the Ivy League schools were in the midst of an argument with the NCAA over player eligibility and Harvard declined the invitation to the NCAA tournament. Clarkson, who had finished third in the ECAC Tournament, was offered Harvard's bid and they accepted. The Golden Knights couldn't overcome Denver in the semifinal but did win the consolation game, ending their season on a high note.

== Career statistics ==
=== Regular season and playoffs ===
			Regular Season					Playoffs
Season	Team	League	GP	G	A	Pts	PIM	GP	G	A	Pts	PIM
1960–61	Clarkson	Tri-State League	17	4	12	16	—	—	—	—	—	—
1961–62	Clarkson	ECAC Hockey	26	4	13	17	—	—	—	—	—	—
1962–63	Clarkson	ECAC Hockey	25	7	18	25	—	—	—	—	—	—
NCAA Totals			68	15	43	58	—	—	—	—	—	—

== Awards and honors ==
Award	Year
All-ECAC Hockey First Team	1961–62
All-ECAC Hockey First Team	1962–63
AHCA East All-American	1962–63
ECAC Hockey All-Tournament Second Team	1963
