= Arlie Parker =

American ice hockey player (born 1938)

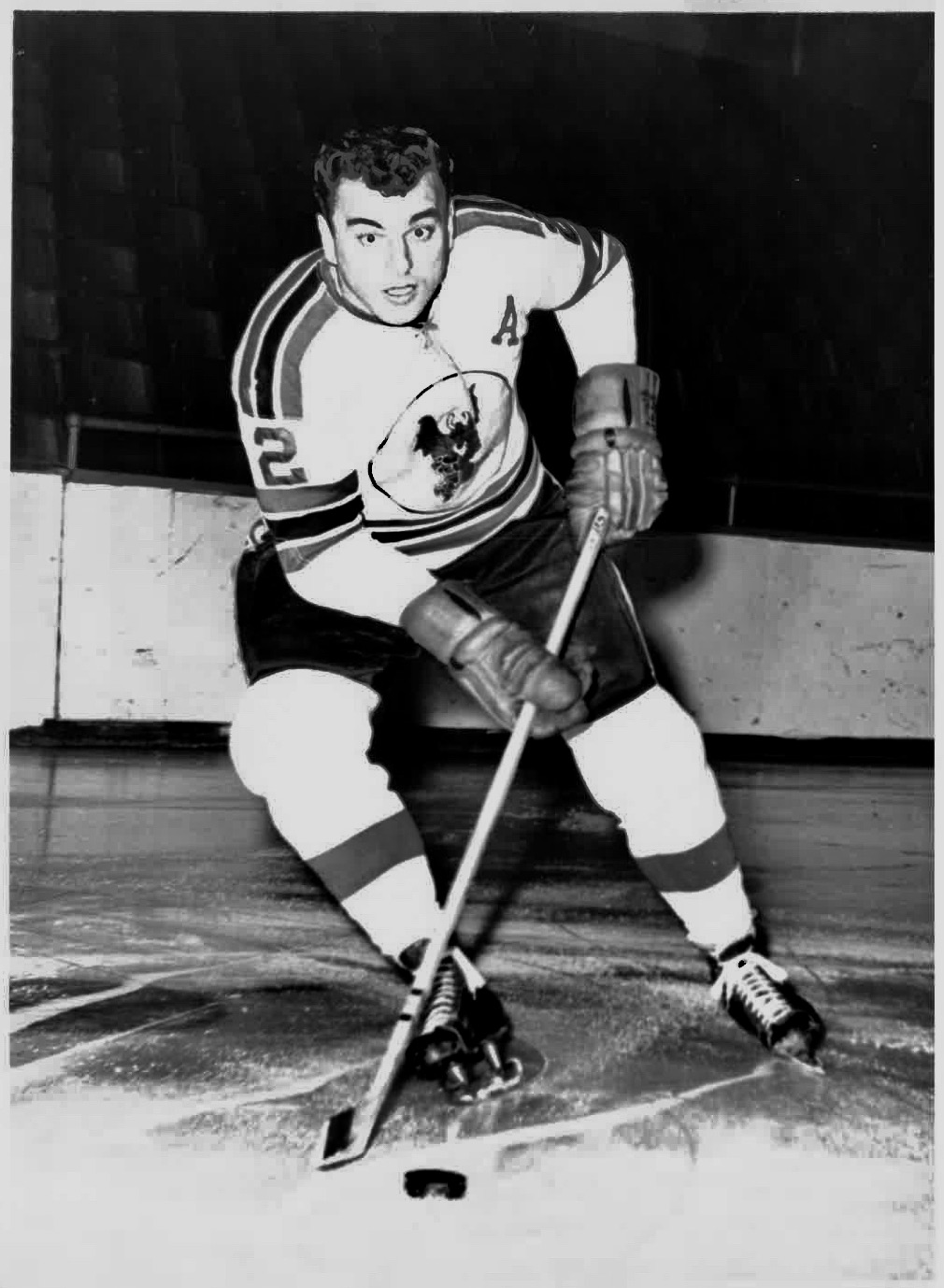
- Parker in 1965
- Born: 1938 (age 87–88) Kitchener, Ontario, Canada
- Height: 6 ft 0 in (183 cm)
- Weight: 210 lb (95 kg; 15 st 0 lb)
- Position: Defenseman
- Played for: St. Lawrence; Johnstown Jets; Jersey Devils
- Playing career: 1959–1966

Arlie Parker (born 1938) is a Canadian retired ice hockey defenseman who was a two-time All-American for St. Lawrence University in New York.

== Career ==
Parker played junior hockey for the Peterborough Petes after the team relocated from his home town of Kitchener in 1956. Parker's final season with the team saw the Petes finish in last place in the OHA. Two years later Parker was recruited by George Menard to St. Lawrence and he began playing with the varsity team in 1959. In his first season with the team, Parker helped the saints defend their Tri-State League championship and return to the NCAA Tournament. The next season Parker became a star for the team, becoming an All-American for the team during its third consecutive league championship. In the national tournament, St. Lawrence won its first semifinal game in its sixth appearance and advanced to the first championship game in program history. Unfortunately, Parker's team faced an overwhelming Denver squad and lost by the largest margin of any championship game (as of 2020) 2–12.

In Parker's senior season the Saints joined with 27 other teams to form a new conference, ECAC Hockey and finished 10th in the standings. The team was included in the 8-team postseason tournament because they were ranked higher due to their more arduous schedule and were seeded 4th in the championship. After easily defeating Boston College in the quarterfinals, the Saints played a very strong Harvard team and stormed to a 6–5 victory after finding themselves down 1–4 in the first period. The Larries continued the strong play against Clarkson in the title match and won 5–2. parker was named to the inaugural All-Tournament Team and was selected as the first Most Outstanding Player. The championship gave St. Lawrence a fourth consecutive NCAA tournament appearance, the longest streak in program history (as of 2020). There was hope that the team could improve on their second-place finish the year before but the Larries reverted to type and lost both tournament games to finish in 4th-place. Parker finished his final season in Canton with a second All-American selection on top of being named as the Most Outstanding Defenseman in ECAC Hockey.

Parker continued his playing career after graduating, appearing briefly for the senior Kingston Frontenacs. In 1963 he joined the professional ranks fully, playing on two teams over three seasons in the Eastern Hockey League. After retiring in 1966 he was inducted into the St. Lawrence Athletic Hall of Fame in 1988 for his excellence as a baseball player as well as on the ice.

== Career statistics ==
=== Regular season and playoffs ===
			Regular Season					Playoffs
Season	Team	League	GP	G	A	Pts	PIM	GP	G	A	Pts	PIM
1956–57	Peterborough Petes	OHA	50	1	2	3	0	—	—	—	—	—
1959–60	St. Lawrence	Tri-State League	—	—	—	—	—	—	—	—	—	—
1960–61	St. Lawrence	Tri-State League	22	2	12	14	48	—	—	—	—	—
1961–62	St. Lawrence	ECAC Hockey	—	—	—	—	—	—	—	—	—	—
1961–62	Kingston Frontenacs	EPHL	3	1	0	1	2	—	—	—	—	—
1962–63	Kingston Frontenacs	EPHL	2	0	0	0	0	—	—	—	—	—
1963–64	Johnstown Jets	EHL	68	6	28	34	94	8	1	1	2	12
1964–65	Jersey Devils	EHL	67	7	27	34	99	—	—	—	—	—
1965–66	Jersey Devils	EHL	65	5	23	28	66	—	—	—	—	—
NCAA Totals			—	—	—	—	—	—	—	—	—	—
EHL Totals			200	18	78	96	259	—	—	—	—	—

== Awards and honors ==
Award	Year
AHCA East All-American	1960–61, 1961–62
NCAA All-Tournament Second Team	1961
All-ECAC Hockey First Team	1961–62
ECAC Hockey All-Tournament First Team	1962

Awards and achievements
Preceded by Award Created	ECAC Hockey Outstanding Defenseman; 1961–62	Succeeded by David Johnston
Preceded by Award Created	ECAC Hockey Most Outstanding Player in Tournament; 1962	Succeeded by Gene Kinasewich
