= Frank Stephenson (ice hockey) =

American ice hockey player

- Born: 1940 (age 85–86) Plymouth, NH, USA
- Position: Goaltender
- Played for: Colby
- Playing career: 1959–1962

Frank Stephenson is an American retired ice hockey goaltender who was one of the first two All-Americans for Colby College in 1962.

== Career ==
Stephenson was a three-year varsity player for Colby. Entering his senior season, Colby joined with 27 other eastern schools to form ECAC Hockey. While the Mules weren't considered a threat by many of the traditional eastern powers, Colby ended up winning the inaugural regular season championship by going 17–1–1 in conference play. The shocking finish earned Stephenson a place on the All-ECAC First Team as well as a nod as an All-American. Colby was seeded third in the ECAC Tournament (seedings were arranged based upon rankings and not conference standings) and they won their opening match against Rensselaer. The team's offense faltered in the semifinal against Clarkson and remained dormant in the third place game, preventing Colby from making an almost unthinkable appearance in the NCAA Tournament.

== Awards and honors ==
Award	Year
All-ECAC Hockey First Team	1961–62
AHCA East All-American	1961–62
ECAC Hockey All-Tournament First Team	1962
