= Ron Ryan =

Canadian ice hockey coach (born 1938)

Biographical details
- Born: July 11, 1938 (age 88); Welland, Ontario, Canada

Playing career
- 1959–1962: Colby
- Position: Right Wing

Coaching career (HC unless noted)
- 1962–1964: Pennsylvania
- 1964–1965: Merrimack
- 1965–1972: Colgate
- 1972–1973: New England Whalers (assistant GM)
- 1973–1975: New England Whalers
- 1975–1977: New England Whalers (GM)

Head coaching record
- Overall: 84-100-4 (.457)

Ronald Ryan (born July 11, 1938) is a Canadian former professional ice hockey coach and executive.

== Biography ==
Ryan played junior hockey with the Guelph Biltmores and then enrolled in Colby College. He had 245 points in 73 games with his college hockey team. Ryan earned a graduate degree at the University of Pennsylvania before taking a job as an assistant athletic director at Merrimack College in 1964.

In 1965, Ryan was hired as head coach of the Colgate University hockey team. He took a job with the New England Whalers in 1972, serving as assistant general manager during their initial season of World Hockey Association play. After the Whalers won the Avco Cup during its first year of existence, coach Jack Kelley, who also served as general manager, moved into solely a front office position, and Ryan was hired as head coach. Ryan coached the Whalers to a division title in 1973–74, but his team was upset in the first round by the Chicago Cougars. He was relieved of his coaching duties and replaced by Kelley with five games left in the 1974–75 season, despite having his team sitting in first place once again and having coached the East Division team in the 1974–75 WHA All-Star Game. Ryan then briefly served as a scout, but he was elevated to the position of general manager in December 1975, holding this role for two seasons. Ryan then worked in several other front office roles for the Whalers and later served as president of SportsChannel, a cable sports network.

Ryan joined the Philadelphia Flyers in 1988 as an executive vice president, and was named the chief operating officer of the team in 1991. He was named the team's president in 2003 and held that position for three years until his retirement.

== Personal life ==
He is married to Brenda, a French teacher, and the father of actress Blanchard Ryan, who is also an avid ice hockey fan. She was also married to hockey player Neil Little, whom she divorced, without children.

== Awards and honors ==
Award	Year
All-ECAC Hockey First Team	1961–62
AHCA East All-American	1961–62
ECAC Hockey All-Tournament Second Team	1962

== Head coaching record ==
=== College ===
Record table
Season	Team	Overall	Conference	Standing	Postseason
Merrimack Warriors (ECAC 2) (1964–1965)
1964–65	Merrimack	6-8-0	6-8-0		
Colgate:		6-8-0	6-8-0		
Colgate Red Raiders (ECAC Hockey) (1965–1972)
1965–66	Colgate	14-11-1	8-7-1	7th	ECAC Quarterfinals
1966–67	Colgate	11-15-0	5-11-0	12th	
1967–68	Colgate	12-11-0	9-8-0	10th	
1968–69	Colgate	12-13-0	6-10-0	12th	
1969–70	Colgate	14-7-3	7-7-3	8th	
1970–71	Colgate	7-17-0	4-13-0	15th	
1971–72	Colgate	8-18-0	5-14-0	14th	
Colgate:		78-92-4	44-70-4		
Total:		84-100-4			
National champion Postseason invitational champion Conference regular season champion Conference regular season and conference tournament champion Division regular season champion Division regular season and conference tournament champion Conference tournament champion

=== WHA ===
Team	Year	Regular season						Post season
Team	Year	G	W	L	OTL	Pts	Finish	Result
New England Whalers	1973–74	78	43	31	4	90	1st in East	Lost in semi-finals
New England Whalers	1974–75	73	40	28	5	(85)	1st in East	Fired
NHL Total		151	83	59	9			

Awards and achievements
Preceded by Phil Latreille	NCAA Ice Hockey Scoring Champion; 1961–62	Succeeded by Tom Roe
Preceded by Award Created	ECAC Hockey Player of the Year; 1961–62	Succeeded by Bob Brinkworth
Sporting positions
Preceded by Jack Kelley	Head coach of the New England Whalers; 1973–75	Succeeded by Jack Kelley
Preceded by Jack Kelley	General manager of the New England Whalers; 1975–77	Succeeded by Jack Kelley
