= John Chandik =

Canadian ice hockey player

- Born: 1937 (age 88–89) Port Colborne, Ontario, Canada
- Height: 5 ft 9 in (175 cm)
- Weight: 150 lb (68 kg; 10 st 10 lb)
- Position: Goaltender
- Played for: Michigan State
- Playing career: 1960–1963

John Chandik is a Canadian retired ice hockey goaltender who was an All-American for Michigan State.

== Career ==
Chandik was a three-year varsity player for Michigan State in the early 1960s. In 1962 the Spartans did not play particularly well, finishing with a middling record, but were able to make their conference tournament. One of the main reasons for the minor success was the play of Chandik, and he was honored by being named an All-American for the year. Michigan State and Chandik could not sustain the level of play and the team finished 6th out of 7th schools for his senior season. Chandik played a bit longer, appearing in the mid-60's for the Fox Valley Astros in their only season of existence. Even after retiring as a player he continued with the game, serving as head coach for the Milwaukee Admirals for two seasons just prior to the team joining the USHL.

== Statistics ==
=== Regular season and playoffs ===
			Regular season									Playoffs
Season	Team	League	GP	W	L	T	MIN	GA	SO	GAA	SV%	GP	W	L	MIN	GA	SO	GAA	SV%
1960–61	Michigan State	WCHA	15	—	—	—	—	—	—	3.53	—	—	—	—	—	—	—	—	—
1961–62	Michigan State	WCHA	25	—	—	—	—	—	—	3.79	.891	—	—	—	—	—	—	—	—
1962–63	Michigan State	WCHA	21	—	—	—	—	—	—	4.30	.884	—	—	—	—	—	—	—	—
NCAA totals			61	—	—	—	—	—	—	—	—	—	—	—	—	—	—	—	—

== Awards and honors ==
Award	Year
AHCA West All-American	1961–62
