= List of ECAC Hockey All-Tournament Teams =

The ECAC Hockey All-Tournament Team is an honor bestowed at the conclusion of the conference tournament to the players judged to have performed the best during the championship. Currently the team is composed of three forwards, two defensemen and one goaltender with additional players named in the event of a tie. Voting for the honor is conducted by the head coaches of each member team once the tournament has completed and any player regardless of their team's finish is eligible.

The All-Tournament Team was first awarded after the premier championship in 1962 as was a Second-Team. This format continued until 1972 after which the All-Tournament team was abolished until 1988 tournament when only one All-Tournament Team was named. Since then it has continued unchanged. (as of 2014)

== All-Tournament Teams ==
=== 1960s ===
1962
| Player | Pos | Team |
|---|---|---|
| Frank Stephenson | G | Colby |
| Arlie Parker | D | St. Lawrence |
| David Johnston | D | Harvard |
| Ron Mason | F | St. Lawrence |
| Tim Taylor | F | Harvard |
| Hal Pettersen | F | Clarkson |

1963
| Player | Pos | Team |
|---|---|---|
| Tom Apprille | G | Boston College |
| David Johnston | D | Harvard |
| Pat Brophy | D | Clarkson |
| Jack Leetch | F | Boston College |
| Corby Adams | F | Clarkson |
| Gene Kinasewich | F | Harvard |

1964
| Player | Pos | Team |
|---|---|---|
| Bob Perani | G | St. Lawrence |
| Larry Kish | D | Providence |
| Jim Salfi | D | St. Lawrence |
| Bob Brinkworth | F | Rensselaer |
| Jerry Knightley | F | Rensselaer |
| Ray Mooney | F | Providence |

1965
| Player | Pos | Team |
|---|---|---|
| Terry Yurkiewicz | G | Clarkson |
| Tom Ross | D | Boston University |
| Ralph Toran | D | Boston College |
| John Cunniff | F | Boston College |
| Fred Bassi | F | Boston University |
| Phil Dyer | F | Boston College |

1966
| Player | Pos | Team |
|---|---|---|
| Terry Yurkiewicz | G | Clarkson |
| Bob Gaudreau | D | Brown |
| Harry Orr | D | Cornell |
| Doug Ferguson | F | Cornell |
| Tom Hurley | F | Clarkson |
| Harry Dunn | F | Clarkson |

1967
| Player | Pos | Team |
|---|---|---|
| Ken Dryden | G | Cornell |
| Harry Orr | D | Cornell |
| Brian Gilmour | D | Boston University |
| Mike Doran | F | Cornell |
| Doug Ferguson | F | Cornell |
| Jim Quinn | F | Boston University |

1968
| Player | Pos | Team |
|---|---|---|
| Ken Dryden | G | Cornell |
| Bruce Pattison | D | Cornell |
| Skip Stanowski | D | Cornell |
| Brian Cornell | F | Cornell |
| Tim Sheehy | F | Boston College |
| Fred Silver | F | Clarkson |

1969
| Player | Pos | Team |
|---|---|---|
| Ken Dryden | G | Cornell |
| Chris Gurry | D | Harvard |
| Bruce Pattison | D | Cornell |
| Joe Cavanagh | F | Harvard |
| Brian Cornell | F | Cornell |
| Herb Wakabayashi | F | Boston University |

=== 1970s ===
1970
| Player | Pos | Team |
|---|---|---|
| Bruce Bullock | G | Clarkson |
| Steve Warr | D | Clarkson |
| Dan Lodboa | D | Cornell |
| Joe Cavanagh | F | Harvard |
| Kevin Pettit | F | Cornell |
| Dick Toomey | F | Boston University |

1971
| Player | Pos | Team |
|---|---|---|
| Bruce Bullock | G | Clarkson |
| Jim Higgs | D | Cornell |
| Steve Warr | D | Clarkson |
| Joe Cavanagh | F | Harvard |
| John Halme | F | Clarkson |
| Dave Hynes | F | Harvard |

1972
| Player | Pos | Team |
|---|---|---|
| Dan Brady | G | Boston University |
| Bob Brown | D | Boston University |
| Jim Higgs | D | Cornell |
| Don Cahoon | F | Boston University |
| John Danby | F | Boston University |
| Larry Fullan | F | Cornell |
| Dave Wisener | F | Boston University |

=== 1980s ===
1988
| Player | Pos | Team |
|---|---|---|
| John Fletcher | G | Clarkson |
| Hank Lammens | D | St. Lawrence |
| Pete McGeough | D | St. Lawrence |
| Peter Ciavaglia | F | Harvard |
| Pete Lappin | F | St. Lawrence |
| Steve Williams | F | Clarkson |

1989
| Player | Pos | Team |
|---|---|---|
| Paul Cohen | G | St. Lawrence |
| Mike Hurlbut | D | St. Lawrence |
| Russ Mann | D | St. Lawrence |
| Ian Boyce | F | Vermont |
| Lane MacDonald | F | Harvard |
| Doug Murray | F | St. Lawrence |

=== 1990s ===
1990
| Player | Pos | Team |
|---|---|---|
| Dave Gagnon | G | Colgate |
| Dan Ratushny | D | Cornell |
| Stephane Robitaille | D | Rensselaer |
| Dave Tretowicz | D | Clarkson |
| Joel Gardner | F | Colgate |
| Tony Hejna | F | Rensselaer |
| Craig Woodcroft | F | Colgate |

1991
| Player | Pos | Team |
|---|---|---|
| Chris Rogles | G | Clarkson |
| Daniel Laperrière | D | St. Lawrence |
| Dave Tretowicz | D | Clarkson |
| Hugo Belanger | F | Clarkson |
| Andy Pritchard | F | St. Lawrence |
| Scott Thomas | F | Clarkson |

1992
| Player | Pos | Team |
|---|---|---|
| Parris Duffus | G | Cornell |
| Daniel Laperrière | D | St. Lawrence |
| Chris Lappin | D | St. Lawrence |
| Mike Lappin | F | St. Lawrence |
| Marko Tuomainen | F | Clarkson |
| Chris Wells | F | St. Lawrence |

1993
| Player | Pos | Team |
|---|---|---|
| Chris Rogles | G | Clarkson |
| Jamie O'Brien | D | Brown |
| Guy Sanderson | D | Clarkson |
| Chris Kaban | F | Brown |
| Matt Mallgrave | F | Harvard |
| Todd Marchant | F | Clarkson |

1994
| Player | Pos | Team |
|---|---|---|
| Aaron Israel | G | Harvard |
| Derek Maguire | D | Harvard |
| Sean McCann | D | Harvard |
| Craig Conroy | F | Clarkson |
| Steve Martins | F | Harvard |
| Bryan Richardson | F | Rensselaer |

1995
| Player | Pos | Team |
|---|---|---|
| Mike Tamburro | G | Rensselaer |
| Adam Bartell | D | Rensselaer |
| Brian Mueller | D | Clarkson |
| Jonathan Kelly | F | Princeton |
| Chris Lipsett | F | Clarkson |
| Tim Regan | F | Rensselaer |

1996
| Player | Pos | Team |
|---|---|---|
| Jason Elliott | G | Cornell |
| Jeremiah McCarthy | D | Harvard |
| Steve Wilson | D | Cornell |
| Tommy Holmes | F | Harvard |
| Mike Sancimino | F | Cornell |
| Martin St. Louis | F | Vermont |

1997
| Player | Pos | Team |
|---|---|---|
| Jason Elliott | G | Cornell |
| Jason Dailey | D | Cornell |
| Steve Wilson | D | Cornell |
| Matt Garver | F | Rensselaer |
| Jean-Francois Houle | F | Clarkson |
| Todd White | F | Clarkson |

1998
| Player | Pos | Team |
|---|---|---|
| Erasmo Saltarelli | G | Princeton |
| Willie Mitchell | D | Clarkson |
| Steve Shirreffs | D | Princeton |
| Syl Apps III | F | Princeton |
| Jeff Halpern | F | Princeton |
| Matt Reid | F | Clarkson |

1999
| Player | Pos | Team |
|---|---|---|
| Eric Heffler | G | St. Lawrence |
| Justin Harney | D | St. Lawrence |
| Willie Mitchell | D | Clarkson |
| Erik Cole | F | Clarkson |
| Jeff Halpern | F | Princeton |
| Dan Riva | F | Rensselaer |

=== 2000s ===
2000
| Player | Pos | Team |
|---|---|---|
| Derek Gustafson | G | St. Lawrence |
| Justin Harney | D | St. Lawrence |
| Brian Pothier | D | Rensselaer |
| Brandon Dietrich | F | St. Lawrence |
| Keith Dupee | F | Rensselaer |
| Jason Windle | F | St. Lawrence |

2001
| Player | Pos | Team |
|---|---|---|
| Jeremy Symington | G | St. Lawrence |
| Matt Desrosiers | D | St. Lawrence |
| Douglas Murray | D | Cornell |
| Blair Clarance | F | St. Lawrence |
| David Francois | F | Cornell |
| Tyler Kolarik | F | Harvard |

2002
| Player | Pos | Team |
|---|---|---|
| Matt Underhill | G | Cornell |
| Kerry Ellis-Toddington | D | Clarkson |
| Douglas Murray | D | Cornell |
| Matt Murley | F | Rensselaer |
| Sam Paolini | F | Cornell |
| Tim Pettit | F | Harvard |

2003
| Player | Pos | Team |
|---|---|---|
| Yann Danis | G | Brown |
| Dov Grumet-Morris | G | Harvard |
| Douglas Murray | D | Cornell |
| Travis Bell | D | Cornell |
| Dominic Moore | F | Harvard |
| Stephen Bâby | F | Cornell |
| Brendan Bernakevitch | F | Harvard |

2004
| Player | Pos | Team |
|---|---|---|
| Dov Grumet-Morris | G | Harvard |
| Michael Grenzy | D | Clarkson |
| Dave McCulloch | D | Harvard |
| Brendan Bernakevitch | F | Harvard |
| Tom Cavanagh | F | Harvard |
| Tristan Lush | F | Clarkson |

2005
| Player | Pos | Team |
|---|---|---|
| David McKee | G | Cornell |
| Charlie Cook | D | Cornell |
| Joey Mormina | D | Colgate |
| Kevin Du | F | Harvard |
| Matt Moulson | F | Cornell |
| Daniel Pegoraro | F | Cornell |

2006
| Player | Pos | Team |
|---|---|---|
| John Dagineau | G | Harvard |
| Ryan O'Byrne | D | Cornell |
| Dylan Reese | D | Harvard |
| Kevin Du | F | Harvard |
| Jimmy Fraser | F | Harvard |
| Dan Murphy | F | Harvard |

2007
| Player | Pos | Team |
|---|---|---|
| Bud Fisher | G | Quinnipiac |
| Drew Bagnall | D | St. Lawrence |
| Reid Cashman | D | Quinnipiac |
| Chris D'Alvise | F | Clarkson |
| Ben Nelson | F | Quinnipiac |
| Shawn Weller | F | Clarkson |

2008
| Player | Pos | Team |
|---|---|---|
| Zane Kalemba | G | Princeton |
| Alex Biega | D | Harvard |
| Mike Moore | D | Princeton |
| Mike Kennedy | F | Cornell |
| Kevin Lohry | F | Princeton |
| Jon Pelle | F | Harvard |

2009
| Player | Pos | Team |
|---|---|---|
| Alec Richards | G | Yale |
| Ryan Donald | D | Yale |
| Jared Seminoff | D | Cornell |
| Sean Backman | F | Yale |
| Dan Bartlett | F | Princeton |
| Broc Little | F | Yale |

=== 2010s ===
2010
| Player | Pos | Team |
|---|---|---|
| Ben Scrivens | G | Cornell |
| Justin Krueger | D | Cornell |
| Mike Schreiber | D | Union |
| Colin Greening | F | Cornell |
| Riley Nash | F | Cornell |
| Adam Presiznuk | F | Union |

2011
| Player | Pos | Team |
|---|---|---|
| Ryan Rondeau | G | Yale |
| Connor Goggin | D | Dartmouth |
| Jimmy Martin | D | Yale |
| Chris Cahill | F | Yale |
| Andrew Miller | F | Yale |
| Brian O'Neill | F | Yale |

2012
| Player | Pos | Team |
|---|---|---|
| Troy Grosenick | G | Union |
| Danny Biega | D | Harvard |
| Shayne Gostisbehere | D | Union |
| Daniel Carr | F | Union |
| Alex Killorn | F | Harvard |
| Jeremy Welsh | F | Union |

2013
| Player | Pos | Team |
|---|---|---|
| Troy Grosenick | G | Union |
| Greg Coburn | D | Union |
| Dennis Robertson | D | Brown |
| Daniel Carr | F | Union |
| Matt Lorito | F | Brown |
| Max Novak | F | Union |

2014
| Player | Pos | Team |
|---|---|---|
| Colin Stevens | G | Union |
| Mathew Bodie | D | Union |
| Shayne Gostisbehere | D | Union |
| Daniel Carr | F | Union |
| Tyson Spink | F | Colgate |
| Mike Vecchione | F | Union |

2015
| Player | Pos | Team |
|---|---|---|
| Steve Michalek | G | Harvard |
| Spiro Goulakos | D | Colgate |
| Patrick McNally | D | Harvard |
| Darcy Murphy | F | Colgate |
| Mike Borkowski | F | Colgate |
| Jimmy Vesey | F | Harvard |

2016
| Player | Pos | Team |
|---|---|---|
| Michael Garteig | G | Quinnipiac |
| Gavin Bayreuther | D | St. Lawrence |
| Connor Clifton | D | Quinnipiac |
| Travis St. Denis | F | Quinnipiac |
| Landon Smith | F | Quinnipiac |
| Jimmy Vesey | F | Harvard |

2017
| Player | Pos | Team |
|---|---|---|
| Merrick Madsen | G | Harvard |
| Adam Fox | D | Harvard |
| Patrick McCarron | D | Cornell |
| Sean Malone | F | Harvard |
| Ryan Donato | F | Harvard |
| Luke Esposito | F | Harvard |

2018
| Player | Pos | Team |
|---|---|---|
| Ryan Ferland | G | Princeton |
| Kelly Summers | D | Clarkson |
| Josh Teves | D | Princeton |
| Eric Robinson | F | Princeton |
| Max Becker | F | Princeton |
| Sheldon Rempal | F | Clarkson |

2019
| Player | Pos | Team |
|---|---|---|
| Jake Kielly | G | Clarkson |
| Yanni Kaldis | D | Cornell |
| Matt Nuttle | D | Cornell |
| Noah Bauld | F | Cornell |
| Devin Brosseau | F | Clarkson |
| Nico Sturm | F | Clarkson |

=== 2020s ===
2020
Tournament Cancelled

2021
Not Awarded

2022
Not Awarded

2023
| Player | Pos | Team |
|---|---|---|
| Carter Gylander | G | Colgate |
| Zach Metsa | D | Quinnipiac |
| Henry Thrun | D | Harvard |
| Alex Young | F | Colgate |
| Alex Laferriere | F | Harvard |
| Ross Mitton | F | Colgate |

2024
| Player | Pos | Team |
|---|---|---|
| Ben Kraws | G | St. Lawrence |
| Ben Robertson | D | Cornell |
| John Fusco | D | Dartmouth |
| Jonathan Castagna | F | Cornell |
| Gabriel Seger | F | Cornell |
| Tomáš Mazura | F | St. Lawrence |

2025
| Player | Pos | Team |
|---|---|---|
| Ian Shane | G | Cornell |
| Tim Rego | D | Cornell |
| Trey Taylor | D | Clarkson |
| Jonathan Castagna | F | Cornell |
| Nick DeSantis | F | Cornell |
| Ayrton Martino | F | Clarkson |

2026
| Player | Pos | Team |
|---|---|---|
| Emmett Croteau | G | Dartmouth |
| Tim Busconi | D | Dartmouth |
| C. J. Foley | D | Dartmouth |
| Kai Daniels | F | Princeton |
| Joshua Karnish | F | Princeton |
| Hayden Stavroff | F | Dartmouth |

=== All-Tournament Team players by school ===
==== Current members ====
| School | Winners |
|---|---|
| Cornell | 56 |
| Harvard | 48 |
| Clarkson | 45 |
| St. Lawrence | 30 |
| Princeton | 16 |
| Union | 15 |
| Rensselaer | 13 |
| Colgate | 11 |
| Yale | 9 |
| Quinnipiac | 8 |
| Brown | 6 |
| Dartmouth | 6 |

==== Former Members ====
| School | Winners |
|---|---|
| Boston University | 11 |
| Boston College | 6 |
| Vermont | 2 |
| Providence | 2 |
| Colby | 1 |

==== Multiple appearances ====
| Player | All-Tournament Team appearances |
|---|---|
| Daniel Carr | 3 |
| Joe Cavanagh | 3 |
| Ken Dryden | 3 |
| Douglas Murray | 3 |
| many players tied with | 2 |

== All-Tournament Second Teams ==
=== 1960s ===
1962
| Player | Position | Team |
|---|---|---|
| Richie Broadbelt | Goaltender | St. Lawrence |
| Jack Graves | Defenseman | Clarkson |
| Pat Brophy | Defenseman | Clarkson |
| Gene Kinasewich | Forward | Harvard |
| Ron Ryan | Forward | Colby |
| Don Young | Forward | Colby |

1963
| Player | Position | Team |
|---|---|---|
| Godfrey Wood | Goaltender | Harvard |
| Jack Callahan | Defenseman | Boston College |
| Cal Wagner | Defenseman | Clarkson |
| Bill Hogan | Forward | Boston College |
| Ron Mason | Forward | St. Lawrence |
| Tim Taylor | Forward | Harvard |

1964
| Player | Position | Team |
|---|---|---|
| Bill Sack | Goaltender | Rensselaer |
| Bill Grisdale | Defenseman | Rensselaer |
| Fred Kitchen | Defenseman | Rensselaer |
| Corby Adams | Forward | Clarkson |
| Grant Heffernan | Forward | Providence |
| John Keough | Forward | Providence |

1965
| Player | Position | Team |
|---|---|---|
| Pat Murphy | Goaltender | Boston College |
| Don Eccelston | Defenseman | Brown |
| Gary Patterson | Defenseman | Boston College |
| Terry Chapman | Forward | Brown |
| Bruce Fennie | Forward | Boston University |
| Pete Flaherty | Forward | Boston College |

1966
| Player | Position | Team |
|---|---|---|
| Dave Ferguson | Goaltender | Brown |
| Gary Patterson | Defenseman | Clarkson |
| Tom Ross | Defenseman | Boston University |
| Fred Bassi | Forward | Boston University |
| Mike Doran | Forward | Cornell |
| Dave Ferguson | Forward | Cornell |

1967
| Player | Position | Team |
|---|---|---|
| Wayne Ryan | Goaltender | Boston University |
| Peter McLachlan | Defenseman | Boston University |
| Skip Stanowski | Defenseman | Cornell |
| Dave Ferguson | Forward | Cornell |
| Herb Wakabayashi | Forward | Boston University |
| Jerry York | Forward | Boston College |

1968
| Player | Position | Team |
|---|---|---|
| George McPhee | Goaltender | Boston College |
| Darrell Abbott | Defenseman | Boston University |
| Andy Hamilton | Defenseman | Clarkson |
| John Hughes | Forward | Cornell |
| Pete Tufford | Forward | Cornell |
| Herb Wakabayashi | Forward | Boston University |

1969
| Player | Position | Team |
|---|---|---|
| Jim McCann | Goaltender | Boston University |
| Terry Flaman | Defenseman | Harvard |
| Bill Hinch | Defenseman | Boston University |
| Tom Deacon | Forward | Clarkson |
| Kevin Pettit | Forward | Cornell |
| Eddie Wright | Forward | Boston University |

=== 1970s ===
1970
| Player | Position | Team |
|---|---|---|
| Brian Cropper | Goaltender | Cornell |
| Bruce Durno | Goaltender | Harvard |
| Mike Hyndman | Defenseman | Boston University |
| Wayne LaChance | Defenseman | Clarkson |
| Larry Davenport | Forward | Boston University |
| John Halme | Forward | Clarkson |
| George McManama | Forward | Harvard |

1971
| Player | Position | Team |
|---|---|---|
| Bruce Durno | Goaltender | Harvard |
| Bob Brown | Defenseman | Boston University |
| Ric Jordan | Defenseman | Boston University |
| Larry Fullan | Forward | Cornell |
| Jerry Kemp | Forward | Clarkson |
| Steve Stirling | Forward | Boston University |

1972
| Player | Position | Team |
|---|---|---|
| Bob Smith | Goaltender | New Hampshire |
| Ric Jordan | Defenseman | Boston University |
| Mark Noonan | Defenseman | Harvard |
| Bill Hanson | Forward | Cornell |
| Guy Smith | Forward | New Hampshire |
| Carlo Ugolini | Forward | Cornell |

=== All-Tournament Second Team players by school ===
==== Current members ====
| School | Winners |
|---|---|
| Cornell | 11 |
| Clarkson | 10 |
| Harvard | 8 |
| Brown | 3 |
| Rensselaer | 3 |
| St. Lawrence | 2 |

==== Former Members ====
| School | Winners |
|---|---|
| Boston University | 17 |
| Boston College | 7 |
| Colby | 2 |
| New Hampshire | 2 |
| Providence | 2 |

==== Multiple appearances ====
| Player | All-Tournament Second Team appearances |
|---|---|
| Bruce Durno | 2 |
| Dave Ferguson | 2 |
| Ric Jordan | 2 |
| Gary Patterson | 2 |
| Herb Wakabayashi | 2 |

== See also ==
- ECAC Hockey Awards
- Most Outstanding Player in Tournament
