= 1961–62 NCAA men's ice hockey season =

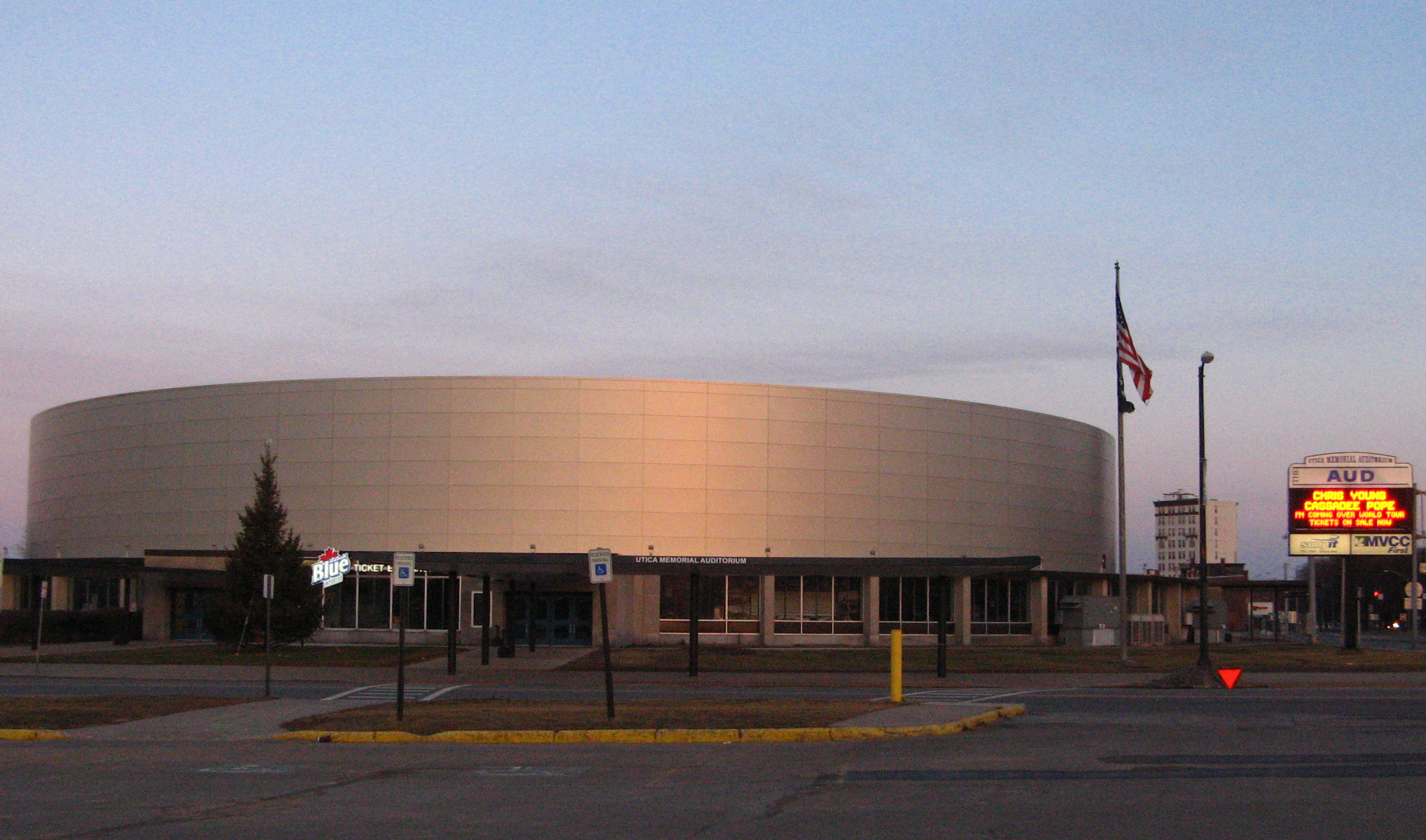
- The Utica Memorial Auditorium served as the host for the 1962 Tournament
- Duration: November 1961– March 17, 1962
- NCAA tournament: 1962
- National championship: Utica Memorial Auditorium; Utica, New York
- NCAA champion: Michigan Tech

The 1961–62 NCAA men's ice hockey season began in November 1961 and concluded with the 1962 NCAA Men's Ice Hockey Tournament's championship game on March 17, 1962 at the Utica Memorial Auditorium in Utica, New York. This was the 15th season in which an NCAA ice hockey championship was held and is the 68th year overall where an NCAA school fielded a team.

This was the premier season for ECAC Hockey which began as a conglomerate of 28 eastern schools among which 8 teams were selected by a committee to participate in a postseason tournament that would determine which university(s) would receive bids to the NCAA tournament. Due to the sheer number of schools and the lack of any scheduling criteria the teams played a vastly unbalanced schedule. As a result, the regular season standings were effectively immaterial in determining the conference tournament participants and the committee based their selections on which teams they felt were the best representatives.

Despite already being in the Tri-State League Clarkson, Rensselaer and St. Lawrence were also founding members of ECAC Hockey and played concurrently in both conferences until the Tri-State League folded in 1972.

This was the first season for Minnesota–Duluth as a university sponsored program.

== Regular season ==
=== Season tournaments ===
Tournament	Dates	Teams	Champion
Brown Holiday Tournament	December 18–20	8	
ECAC Holiday Hockey Festival	December 21–22	4	Clarkson
Boston Arena Christmas Tournament	December 26–28	4	Michigan State
Rensselaer Holiday Tournament	December 28–30	4	Michigan
Beanpot	February 5, 12	4	Harvard

=== Standings ===
1961–62 Big Ten standings
	Conference							Overall					
	GP	W	L	T	Pct.	GF	GA	GP	W	L	T	GF	GA
Michigan†	4	4	0	0	1.000	24	8	27	22	5	0	150	76
Michigan State	8	3	4	1	.438	24	33	25	13	11	1	98	94
Minnesota	4	0	3	1	.125	9	16	21	9	10	2	95	73
† indicates conference regular season champion

1961–62 ECAC Hockey standings
	Conference							Overall					
	GP	W	L	T	Pct.	GF	GA	GP	W	L	T	GF	GA
Colby†	19	17	1	1	.921	124	30	27	19	6	2	147	62
Harvard	20	18	2	0	.900	103	30	26	21	5	0	130	56
Clarkson	15	13	1	1	.900	97	28	26	22	3	1	173	55
Williams	20	16	3	1	.825	159	64	20	16	3	1	159	64
Army	19	14	4	1	.763	81	40	24	17	6	1	111	52
Colgate	24	18	6	0	.750	140	57	24	18	6	0	140	57
Rensselaer	16	12	4	0	.750	99	56	23	16	7	0	142	93
Cornell	16	11	5	0	.688	68	45	18	13	5	0	77	45
MIT	15	10	5	0	.667	70	49	15	10	5	0	70	49
St. Lawrence*	15	9	5	1	.633	83	47	27	17	9	1	135	78
New Hampshire	17	10	7	0	.588	100	63	18	10	7	1	103	66
Boston College	25	13	11	1	.540	84	75	28	15	12	1	96	86
Merrimack	13	7	6	0	.539	71	52	13	7	6	0	71	52
Providence	17	8	7	2	.529	74	65	21	11	8	2	110	77
Middlebury	17	8	8	1	.500	83	81	22	11	9	2	107	98
Bowdoin	21	10	11	0	.476	89	73	23	11	11	1	106	84
Massachusetts	18	8	10	0	.444	84	94	18	8	10	0	84	94
Norwich	20	8	11	1	.425	105	103	21	8	12	1	109	110
Princeton	21	8	12	1	.405	60	88	21	8	12	1	60	88
Dartmouth	20	8	12	0	.400	101	122	20	8	12	0	101	122
Yale	21	7	14	0	.333	78	87	24	8	16	0	78	97
Boston University	24	7	16	1	.313	71	119	25	7	17	1	74	123
Northeastern	23	7	16	0	.304	83	136	24	7	17	0	85	149
Brown	24	7	17	0	.292	82	122	24	7	17	0	81	119
Connecticut	9	2	6	1	.278	30	86	12	2	9	1	30	86
American International	19	4	15	0	.211	78	160	19	4	15	0	78	160
Hamilton	15	1	13	1	.100	24	72	15	1	14	1	24	72
Amherst	15	1	14	0	.067	20	143	15	1	14	0	20	143
Championship: St. Lawrence † indicates conference regular season champion * indicates conference tournament champion

1961–62 NCAA Independent ice hockey standings
	Overall					
	GP	W	L	T	GF	GA
Minnesota–Duluth	22	6	14	2	69	109
St. Olaf	13	8	4	1	–	–

1961–62 Minnesota Intercollegiate Athletic Conference ice hockey standings
	Conference							Overall					
	GP	W	L	T	PTS	GF	GA	GP	W	L	T	GF	GA
Macalester †	–	–	–	–	–	–	–	–	–	–	–	–	–
Augsburg	7	6	1	0	.857	–	–	12	9	3	0	–	–
Concordia	–	–	–	–	–	–	–	6	1	5	0	–	–
Gustavus Adolphus	–	–	–	–	–	–	–	9	1	8	0	–	–
Hamline	–	–	–	–	–	–	–	–	–	–	–	–	–
Saint John's	–	–	–	–	–	–	–	18	3	15	0	–	–
Saint Mary's	–	–	–	–	–	–	–	16	12	4	0	–	–
St. Thomas	–	–	–	–	–	–	–	13	6	7	0	–	–
† indicates conference champion

1961–62 Tri-State League standings
	Conference							Overall					
	GP	W	L	T	PTS	GF	GA	GP	W	L	T	GF	GA
Clarkson†	4	3	0	1	7	23	12	26	22	3	1	173	55
St. Lawrence	4	1	2	1	3	20	21	27	17	9	1	135	78
Rensselaer	4	1	3	0	2	14	25	23	16	7	0	142	93
† indicates conference regular season champion

1961–62 Western Collegiate Hockey Association standings
	Conference							Overall					
	GP	W	L	T	PCT	GF	GA	GP	W	L	T	GF	GA
Michigan Tech†*	20	17	3	0	.850	101	58	32	29	3	0	188	80
Michigan	18	15	3	0	.833	95	48	27	22	5	0	150	76
Denver	18	11	7	0	.611	83	71	30	17	11	2	144	111
Michigan State	16	6	9	1	.406	57	71	25	13	11	1	98	94
North Dakota	18	7	11	0	.389	62	71	26	9	17	0	96	123
Minnesota	16	5	10	1	.344	69	61	21	9	10	2	95	73
Colorado College	18	0	18	0	.000	56	143	23	0	23	0	74	181
Championship: Michigan Tech † indicates conference regular season champion * indicates conference tournament champion

== 1962 NCAA Tournament ==
Semifinals; March 15–16
E1	Clarkson	5
W2	Michigan	4
W1	Michigan Tech	6
E2	St. Lawrence	2

National Championship; March 17
E1	Clarkson	1
W1	Michigan Tech	7
Third Place Game
W2	Michigan	6
E2	St. Lawrence	1

Note: * denotes overtime period(s)

== Player stats ==
=== Scoring leaders ===
The following players led the league in points at the conclusion of the season.

GP = Games played; G = Goals; A = Assists; Pts = Points; PIM = Penalty minutes

Player	Class	Team	GP	G	A	Pts	PIM
Ron Ryan	Senior	Colby	–	48	56	104	-
Tom Roe	Junior	Williams	20	49	33	82	-
Bob Brinkworth	Sophomore	Rensselaer	22	41	30	71	10
Red Berenson	Senior	Michigan	28	43	27	70	40
Jim Josephson	Senior	Rensselaer	23	25	39	64	66
Jerry Sullivan	Senior	Michigan Tech	32	30	29	59	6
Ron Mason	Junior	St. Lawrence	27	26	31	57	–
Gordon Wilkie	Sophomore	Michigan	–	19	36	55	15
Dave Leighton	Junior	Dartmouth	–	37	15	52	–
Lou Lamoriello	Junior	Providence	–	26	26	52	–

=== Leading goaltenders ===
The following goaltenders led the league in goals against average at the end of the regular season while playing at least 33% of their team's total minutes.

GP = Games played; Min = Minutes played; W = Wins; L = Losses; OT = Overtime/shootout losses; GA = Goals against; SO = Shutouts; SV% = Save percentage; GAA = Goals against average

Player	Class	Team	GP	Min	W	L	OT	GA	SO	SV%	GAA
Godfrey Wood	Junior	Harvard	17	-	-	-	-	-	-	.926	1.75
George Baland	Sophomore	North Dakota	-	-	-	-	-	-	0	.889	2.00
Robert Bland	Senior	Harvard	16	-	-	-	-	-	-	-	2.06
Wayne Gibbons	Junior	Clarkson	21	-	18	-	-	-	-	.914	2.10
Ron Chisholm	Senior	Army	24	1459	17	6	1	53	5	.919	2.18
Garry Bauman	Sophomore	Michigan Tech	25	1500	23	2	0	61	0	.907	2.44
Laing Kennedy	Junior	Cornell	18	-	-	-	-	-	-	.918	2.50
Richie Broadbelt	Junior	St. Lawrence	22	1351	-	-	-	64	2	.909	2.84
Mike Larson	Junior	Minnesota	22	-	-	-	-	-	-	-	3.23
David Smith	Sophomore	Yale	-	-	-	-	-	-	-	-	3.50

== Awards ==
=== NCAA ===
Award		Recipient
Spencer Penrose Award		Jack Kelley, Colby
Most Outstanding Player in NCAA Tournament		Lou Angotti, Michigan Tech
AHCA All-American Teams
East Team	Position	West Team
Frank Stephenson, Colby	G	John Chandik, Michigan State
David Johnston, Harvard	D	Henry Åkervall, Michigan Tech
Arlie Parker, St. Lawrence	D	Elov Seger, Michigan Tech
Bill Hogan, Boston College	F	Lou Angotti, Michigan Tech
Ron Ryan, Colby	F	Red Berenson, Michigan
Dates Fryberger, Middlebury	F	Jerry Sullivan, Michigan Tech

=== WCHA ===
Award		Recipient
Most Valuable Player		Red Berenson, Michigan
Sophomore of the Year		Gordon Wilkie, Michigan
Coach of the Year		John MacInnes, Michigan Tech
All-WCHA Teams
First Team	Position	Second Team
Garry Bauman, Michigan Tech	G	Bob Gray, Michigan
Henry Åkervall, Michigan Tech	D	Elov Seger, Michigan Tech
Jack Wilson, Denver	D	Don Rodgers, Michigan
Red Berenson, Michigan	F	Gene Rebellato, Michigan Tech
Jerry Sullivan, Michigan Tech	F	Trent Beatty, Denver
Lou Angotti, Michigan Tech	F	Gordon Wilkie, Michigan

=== ECAC ===
Award		Recipient
Player of the Year		Ron Ryan, Colby
Rookie of the Year		Bob Brinkworth, Rensselaer
Outstanding Defenseman		Arlie Parker, St. Lawrence
Most Outstanding Player in Tournament		Arlie Parker, St. Lawrence
All-ECAC Hockey Teams
First Team	Position	Second Team
Glen Eberly, Boston University	G	Richie Broadbelt, St. Lawrence
Frank Stephenson, Colby	G	Wayne Gibbons, Clarkson
	G	Laing Kennedy, Cornell
Arlie Parker, St. Lawrence	D	Brian Robins, Rensselaer
David Johnston, Harvard	D	Joe McGeough, Providence
Don Young, Colby	D	Harry Howell, Harvard
Jack Leetch, Boston College	D	Tom McMahon, Rensselaer
Cal Wagner, Clarkson	D	Pat Brophy, Clarkson
Ron Ryan, Colby	F	Jim Josephson, Rensselaer
Bill Hogan, Boston College	F	Rollie Anderson, St. Lawrence
Dates Fryberger, Middlebury	F	Tom Roe, Williams
Gene Kinasewich, Harvard	F	Dave Leighton, Dartmouth
Ron Mason, St. Lawrence	F	Marsh Tschida, Providence
Bob Brinkworth, Rensselaer	F	John Cook, Princeton
Tim Taylor, Harvard	F	Roger Purdie, Clarkson
Dave Grannis, Harvard	F	Ron Famigletti, Bowdoin
Hal Pettersen, Clarkson	F	Dave Sveden, Colby
Corby Adams, Clarkson	F	
