= 1962 ECAC Hockey men's ice hockey tournament =

1962 ECAC Men's ice hockey tournament
- Dates: March 6–10, 1962
- Teams: 8
- Finals site: Boston Arena; Boston, Massachusetts
- Champions: St. Lawrence (1st title)
- Winning coach: George Menard (1st title)
- MVP: Arlie Parker (St. Lawrence)
- ECAC Men's Ice Hockey Tournaments

The 1962 ECAC Hockey Men's Ice Hockey Tournament was the 1st tournament in league history. It was played between March 6 and March 10, 1962. Quarterfinal games were played at home team campus sites, while the 'final four' games were played at the Boston Arena in Boston, Massachusetts. By reaching the championship game both, St. Lawrence and Clarkson received invitations to participate in the 1962 NCAA Men's Ice Hockey Tournament.

== Format ==
The tournament featured three rounds of play, all of which were single-elimination. The top eight teams, based on conference rankings, qualified to participate in the tournament. In the quarterfinals the first seed and eighth seed, the second seed and seventh seed, the third seed and sixth seed and the fourth seed and fifth seed played against one another. In the semifinals, the winner of the first and eighth matchup played the winner of the fourth and fifth matchup while the other two remaining teams played with the winners advancing to the championship game and the losers advancing to the third place game.

== Conference standings ==
Note: GP = Games played; W = Wins; L = Losses; T = Ties; Pct. = Winning percentage; GF = Goals for; GA = Goals against

1961–62 ECAC Hockey standings
	Conference							Overall					
	GP	W	L	T	Pct.	GF	GA	GP	W	L	T	GF	GA
Colby†	19	17	1	1	.921	124	30	27	19	6	2	147	62
Harvard	20	18	2	0	.900	103	30	26	21	5	0	130	56
Clarkson	15	13	1	1	.900	97	28	26	22	3	1	173	55
Williams	20	16	3	1	.825	159	64	20	16	3	1	159	64
Army	19	14	4	1	.763	81	40	24	17	6	1	111	52
Colgate	24	18	6	0	.750	140	57	24	18	6	0	140	57
Rensselaer	16	12	4	0	.750	99	56	23	16	7	0	142	93
Cornell	16	11	5	0	.688	68	45	18	13	5	0	77	45
MIT	15	10	5	0	.667	70	49	15	10	5	0	70	49
St. Lawrence*	15	9	5	1	.633	83	47	27	17	9	1	135	78
New Hampshire	17	10	7	0	.588	100	63	18	10	7	1	103	66
Boston College	25	13	11	1	.540	84	75	28	15	12	1	96	86
Merrimack	13	7	6	0	.539	71	52	13	7	6	0	71	52
Providence	17	8	7	2	.529	74	65	21	11	8	2	110	77
Middlebury	17	8	8	1	.500	83	81	22	11	9	2	107	98
Bowdoin	21	10	11	0	.476	89	73	23	11	11	1	106	84
Massachusetts	18	8	10	0	.444	84	94	18	8	10	0	84	94
Norwich	20	8	11	1	.425	105	103	21	8	12	1	109	110
Princeton	21	8	12	1	.405	60	88	21	8	12	1	60	88
Dartmouth	20	8	12	0	.400	101	122	20	8	12	0	101	122
Yale	21	7	14	0	.333	78	87	24	8	16	0	78	97
Boston University	24	7	16	1	.313	71	119	25	7	17	1	74	123
Northeastern	23	7	16	0	.304	83	136	24	7	17	0	85	149
Brown	24	7	17	0	.292	82	122	24	7	17	0	81	119
Connecticut	9	2	6	1	.278	30	86	12	2	9	1	30	86
American International	19	4	15	0	.211	78	160	19	4	15	0	78	160
Hamilton	15	1	13	1	.100	24	72	15	1	14	1	24	72
Amherst	15	1	14	0	.067	20	143	15	1	14	0	20	143
Championship: St. Lawrence † indicates conference regular season champion * indicates conference tournament champion

== Bracket ==
Quarterfinals; March 6
1	Clarkson	6
8	Providence	3
3	Colby	7
6	Rensselaer	6
2	Harvard	2*
7	Army	1
4	St. Lawrence	9
5	Boston College	4

Semifinals; March 9
1	Clarkson	4
3	Colby	1
2	Harvard	5
4	St. Lawrence	6

Championship; March 10
1	Clarkson	2
4	St. Lawrence	5
Third place
2	Harvard	2
3	Colby	0

Note: * denotes overtime period(s)

=== Quarterfinals ===
==== (1) Clarkson vs. (8) Providence ====
March 6	Clarkson	6 – 3	Providence	Clarkson Arena

==== (2) Harvard vs. (7) Army ====
March 6	Harvard	2 – 1	OT	Army	Donald C. Watson Rink

==== (3) Colby vs. (6) Rensselaer ====
March 6	Colby	7 – 6	Rensselaer	Alfond Rink

==== (4) St. Lawrence vs. (5) Boston College ====
March 6	St. Lawrence	9 – 4	Boston College	Appleton Arena

=== Semifinals ===
==== (1) Clarkson vs. (3) Colby ====
March 9	Clarkson	4 – 1	Colby	Boston Arena

==== (2) Harvard vs. (4) St. Lawrence ====
March 9	Harvard	5 – 6	St. Lawrence	Boston Arena

=== Third Place ===
==== (2) Harvard vs. (3) Colby ====
March 10	Harvard	2 – 0	Colby	Boston Arena

=== Championship ===
==== (1) Clarkson vs. (4) St. Lawrence ====
March 10	Clarkson	2 – 5	St. Lawrence	Boston Arena

== Tournament awards ==
=== All-Tournament Team ===
==== First Team ====
- F Tim Taylor (Harvard)
- F Hal Pettersen (Clarkson)
- F Ron Mason (St. Lawrence)
- D Arlie Parker* (St. Lawrence)
- D David Johnston (Harvard)
- G Frank Stephenson (Colby)

* Most Outstanding Player(s)

==== Second Team ====
- F Don Young (Colby)
- F Gene Kinasewich (Harvard)
- F Ron Ryan (Colby)
- D Jack Graves (Clarkson)
- D Pat Brophy (Clarkson)
- G Richie Broadbelt (St. Lawrence)
