= ECAC Hockey =

American collegiate ice hockey conference

- Formerly: Eastern College Athletic Conference (1962–2004); ECAC Hockey League (2004–2007)
- Association: NCAA
- Founded: 1961; 65 years ago
- Commissioner: Doug Christiansen
- Sports fielded: Ice hockey; men's: 12 teams; women's: 12 teams
- Division: Division I
- Divisions: Men's and Women's
- No. of teams: 12
- Headquarters: Clifton Park, New York, U.S.
- Region: Northeastern United States
- Most titles: Men's - Cornell (14); Women's - Harvard (6)
- Website: www.ecachockey.com

Locations

Locations of current ECAC Hockey member institutions

ECAC Hockey is one of the six conferences that compete in NCAA Division I for ice hockey. The conference used to be affiliated with the Eastern College Athletic Conference, a consortium of over 300 colleges in the eastern United States. This relationship ended in 2004; however, the ECAC abbreviation was retained in the name of the hockey conference. ECAC Hockey is the only ice hockey conference with identical memberships in both its women's and men's divisions.

Cornell University has won the most ECAC men's hockey championships with 14, followed by Harvard University at 11. Harvard leads the way with 6 ECAC women's hockey championships.Dartmouth College won the most recent men's championship and Quinnipiac University is the current women's champion. ECAC Hockey teams have won 10 NCAA Division I Men's Ice Hockey Championships, with Quinnipiac's 2023 win being the most recent one.

== History ==
ECAC Hockey was founded in 1961 as a loose association of college hockey teams in the Northeast.

Cornell won the first NCAA championship for ECAC Hockey in 1967 in 4-1 victory over fellow ECAC Hockey team Boston University.

The Big Red won their second title in 1970 to complete the first and thus far only undefeated campaign in NCAA Division I men's ice hockey history, this time with a 6-4 victory over Clarkson.

ECAC Hockey completed back-to-back titles when Boston University won the 1971 championship with a 4-2 victory over Minnesota. The Terriers then made it two in a row for their school and three straight for ECAC Hockey when they repeated as champions in 1972 with a 4-0 victory over Cornell.

Boston University won their third title in 1978 with a 5-3 victory over Boston College, another ECAC Hockey member at that time.

In June 1983, concerns that the Ivy League schools were potentially leaving the conference and disagreements over schedule length versus academics caused Boston University, Boston College, Providence, Northeastern and New Hampshire to decide to leave the ECAC to form what would become Hockey East, which began play in the 1984–85 season. By that fall, Maine also departed the ECAC for the new conference.

This left the ECAC with twelve teams (Army, Brown, Clarkson, Colgate, Cornell, Dartmouth, Harvard, Princeton, RPI, St. Lawrence, Vermont, and Yale). Army would stay in the conference until the end of the 1990–91 season, at which point they became independent (they now play in Atlantic Hockey) and were replaced by Union College. Vermont left the ECAC for Hockey East at the end of the 2004–05 season, and were replaced in the conference by Quinnipiac.

RPI won its second national championship, and first as a member of ECAC Hockey when it defeated Providence of the newly formed Hockey East, 2-1 at the 1985 championship tournament. The Engineers previously won in 1954 as a member of the Tri-State League.

Harvard won its first and thus-far only NCAA Division I Hockey Championship when the Crimson topped Minnesota, 4-3 in overtime at the 1989 Tournament.

After seven titles and multiple Frozen Four representatives in the preceding 23-year period, ECAC Hockey suffered through a 23-year drought before Yale won its first title at the 2013 Tournament with a 4-0 victory over first-time finalists Quinnipiac. The 2013 Tournament was also unique in that with Quinnipiac defeating fellow ECAC Hockey school Union to advance to the Frozen Four before losing to Yale in the final, the only teams to defeat an ECAC school at the Tournament were other schools from ECAC Hockey.

The Dutchmen gained a measure of revenge when it won the 2014 Championship with a 7-4 victory over Minnesota.

After finishing runner up again in 2016, Quinnipiac finally broke through to win their first title at the 2023 Tournament with a 3-2 overtime victory over Minnesota.

The ECAC began sponsoring an invitational women's tournament in 1985. ECAC teams began playing an informal regular season schedule in the 1988–89 season, with the conference officially sponsoring women's hockey beginning in the 1993–94 season. ECAC teams won two of the three pre-NCAA American Women's College Hockey Alliance national championships, New Hampshire winning in 1998 and Harvard in 1999.

The ECAC was the only Division I men's hockey conference that neither gained nor lost members during the major conference realignment in 2011 and 2012 that followed the Big Ten Conference's announcement that it would launch a men's hockey league in the 2013–14 season.

== Membership ==
There are 12 member schools in the ECAC. Since the 2006–07 season, all schools have participated with men's and women's teams, making ECAC Hockey the only Division I hockey conference with a full complement of teams for both sexes.

=== Ivy League Teams ===
Six Ivy League universities with Division I ice hockey programs are members of ECAC Hockey. Those schools are: Harvard University, Dartmouth College, Cornell University, Yale University, Princeton University, and Brown University. Columbia University does not currently have a varsity intercollegiate ice hockey program. Penn supported an intercollegiate varsity hockey program in the past and was an ECAC Hockey member from 1966 to 1978 before the team was disbanded. The Ivy school that has the best record against other Ivy opponents in regular season ECAC games is crowned the Ivy League ice hockey champion. The Ivy League schools require their teams to play seasons that are about three weeks shorter than those of the other schools in the league. Thus, they enter the league schedule with fewer non-conference warm-up games. Harvard competes in the annual Beanpot Tournament.

=== Members ===
Institution	Location	Nickname (men's)	Nickname (women's)	Founded	Historical Affiliation	Enrollment	Primary Conference	Colors
Brown University	Providence, Rhode Island	Bears	Bears	1764	Nonsectarian, founded by Baptists	9,380	Ivy League	
Clarkson University	Potsdam, New York	Golden Knights	Golden Knights	1896	Private/Non-sectarian	4,300	Liberty League (D-III)	
Colgate University	Hamilton, New York	Raiders	Raiders	1819	Private/Baptists	2,982	Patriot League	
Cornell University	Ithaca, New York	Big Red	Big Red	1865	Private/Non-sectarian	23,600	Ivy League	
Dartmouth College	Hanover, New Hampshire	Big Green	Big Green	1769	Private/Congregationalist	5,753	Ivy League	
Harvard University	Cambridge, Massachusetts	Crimson	Crimson	1636	Nonsectarian, founded by Congregationalists	20,042	Ivy League	
Princeton University	Princeton, New Jersey	Tigers	Tigers	1746	Nonsectarian, founded by Presbyterians	6,677	Ivy League	
Quinnipiac University	Hamden, Connecticut	Bobcats	Bobcats	1929	Private/Non-sectarian	10,290	Metro Conference	
Rensselaer Polytechnic Institute	Troy, New York	Engineers	Engineers	1824	Private/Non-sectarian	7,633	Liberty League (D-III)	
St. Lawrence University	Canton, New York	Saints	Saints	1856	Non-denominational, founded by Universalist Church of America	2,487	Liberty League (D-III)	
Union College	Schenectady, New York	Garnet Chargers	Garnet Chargers	1795	Private/Non-sectarian	2,050	Liberty League (D-III)	
Yale University	New Haven, Connecticut	Bulldogs	Bulldogs	1701	Private/Congregationalist	12,458	Ivy League	

ECAC members

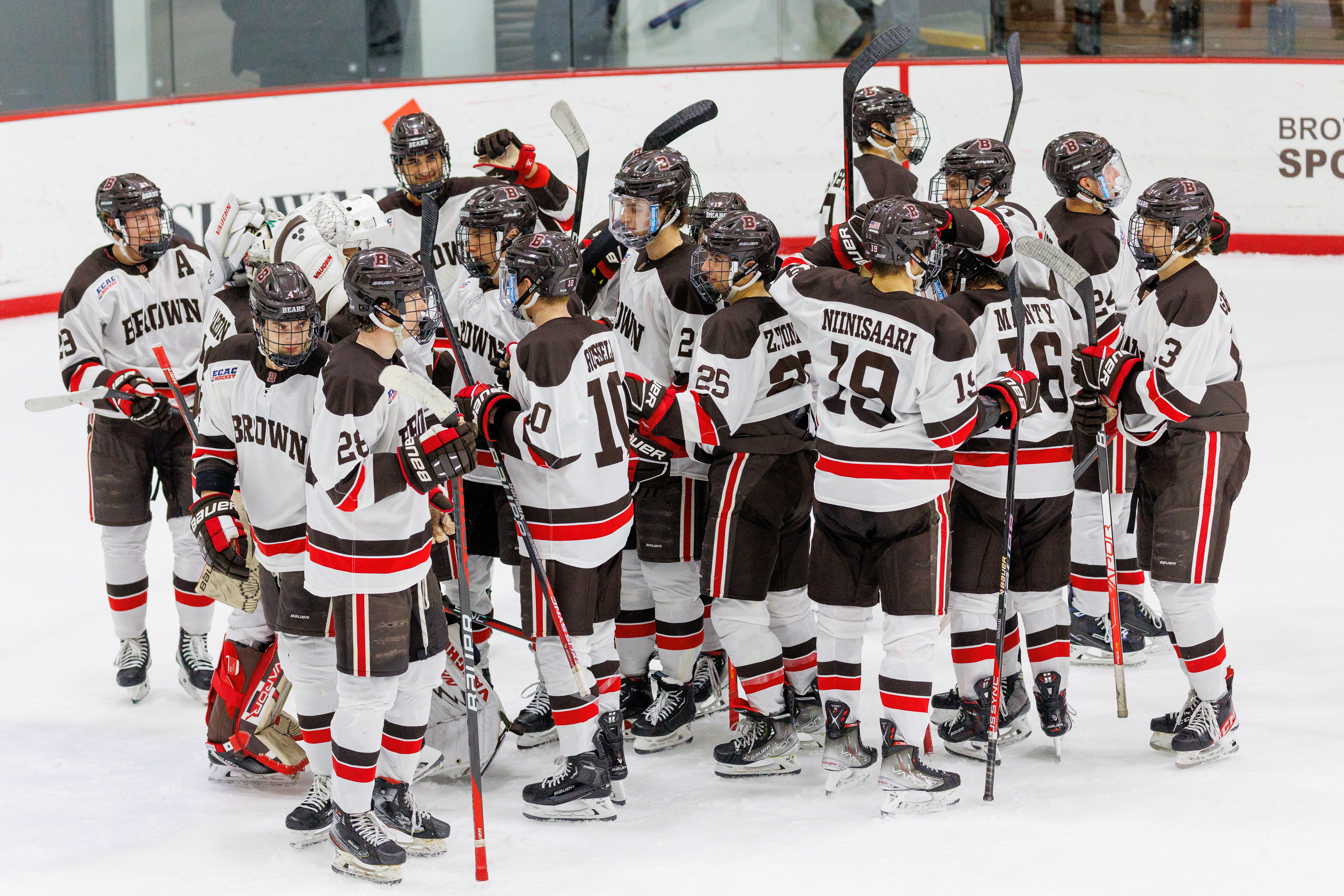
Brown Bears

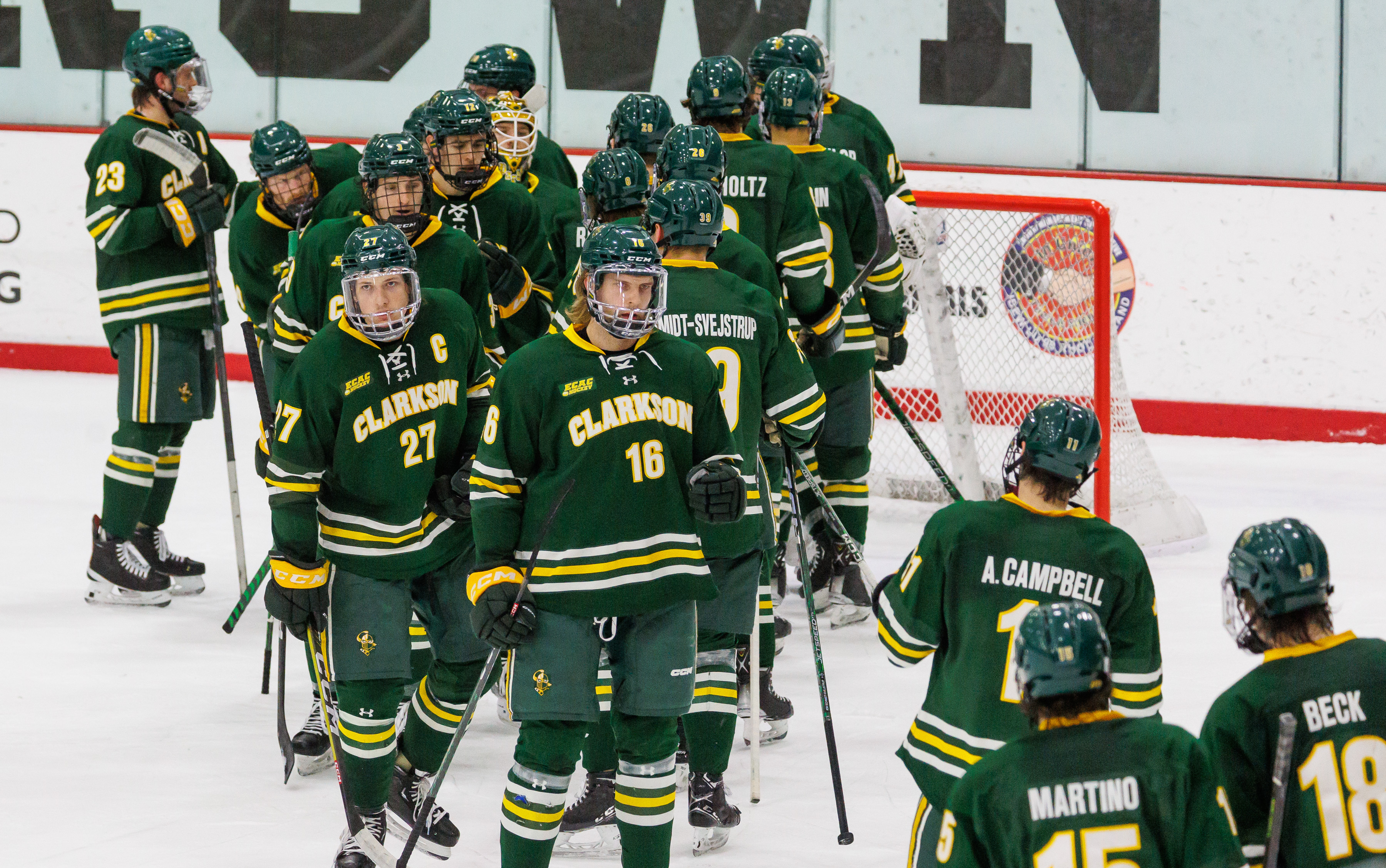
Clarkson Golden Knights

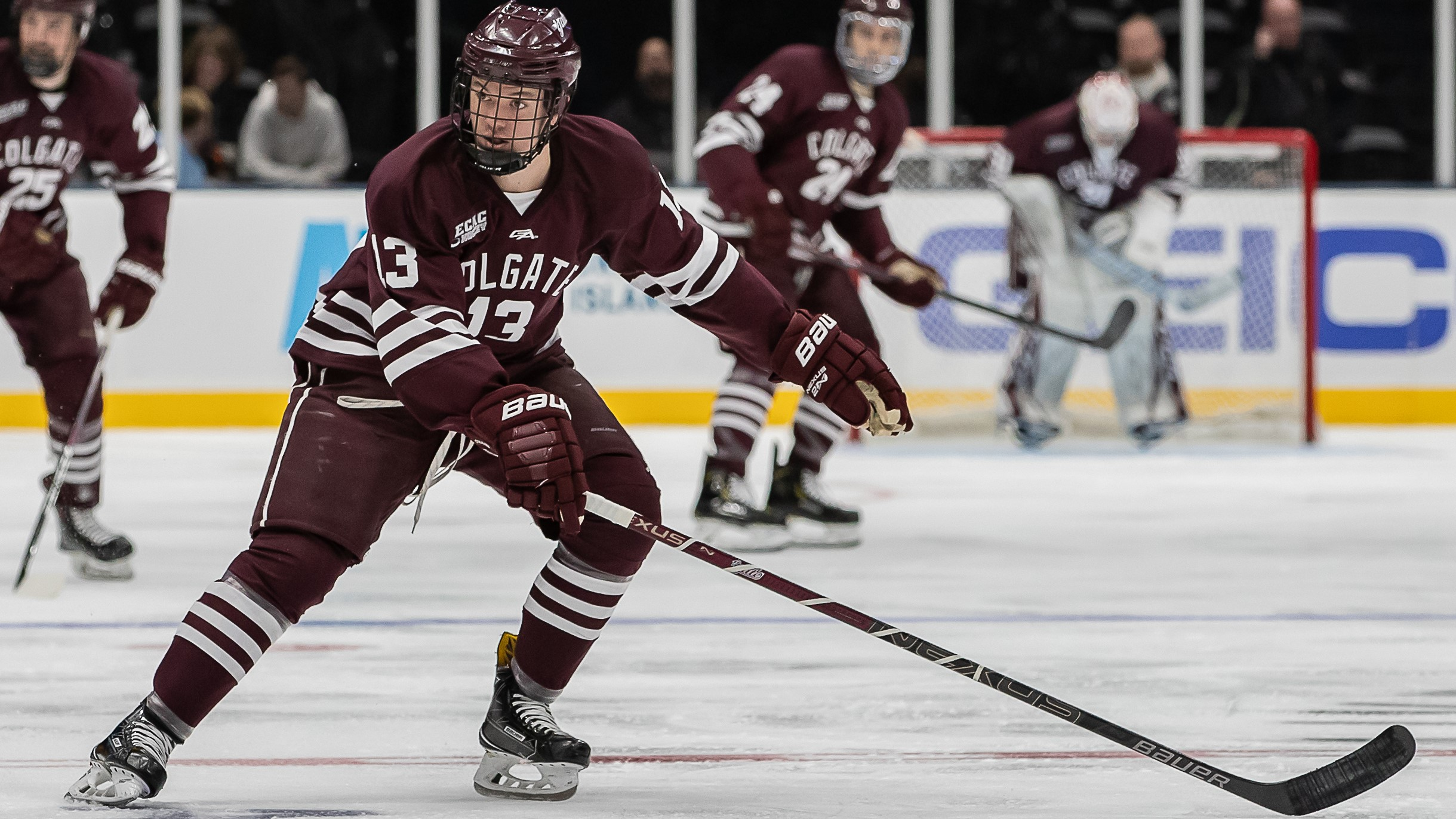
Colgate Raiders

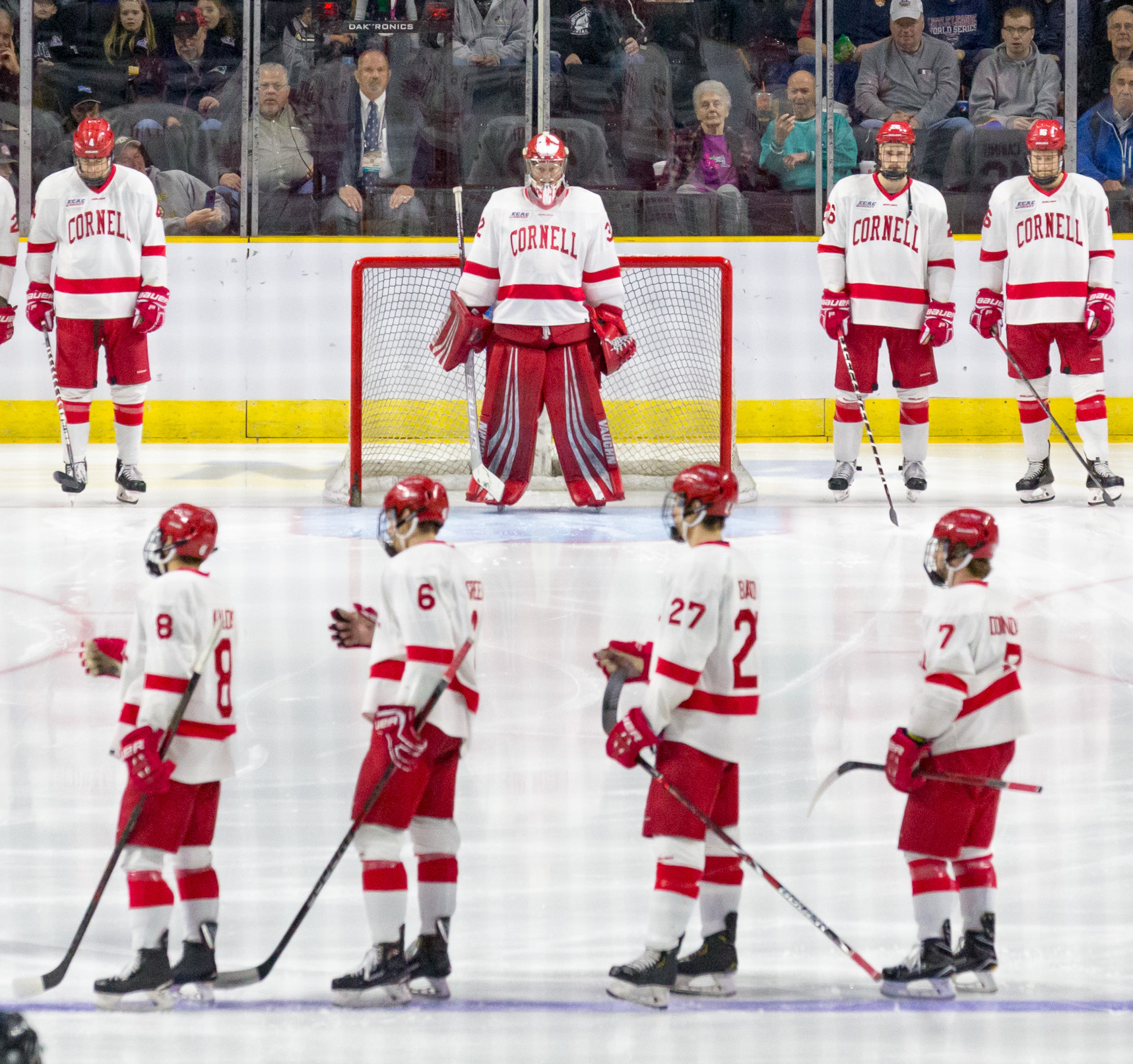
Cornell Big Red

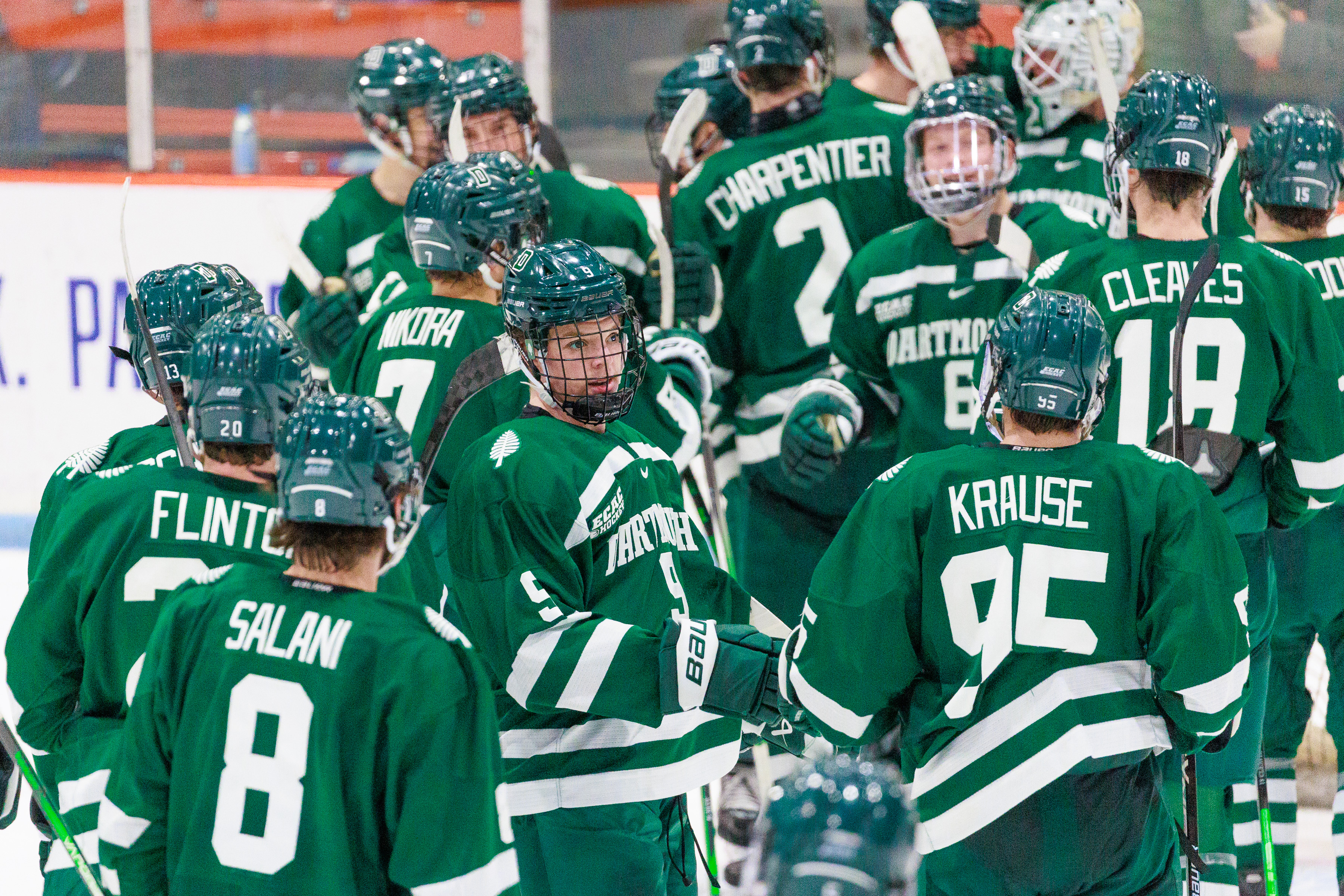
Dartmouth Big Green

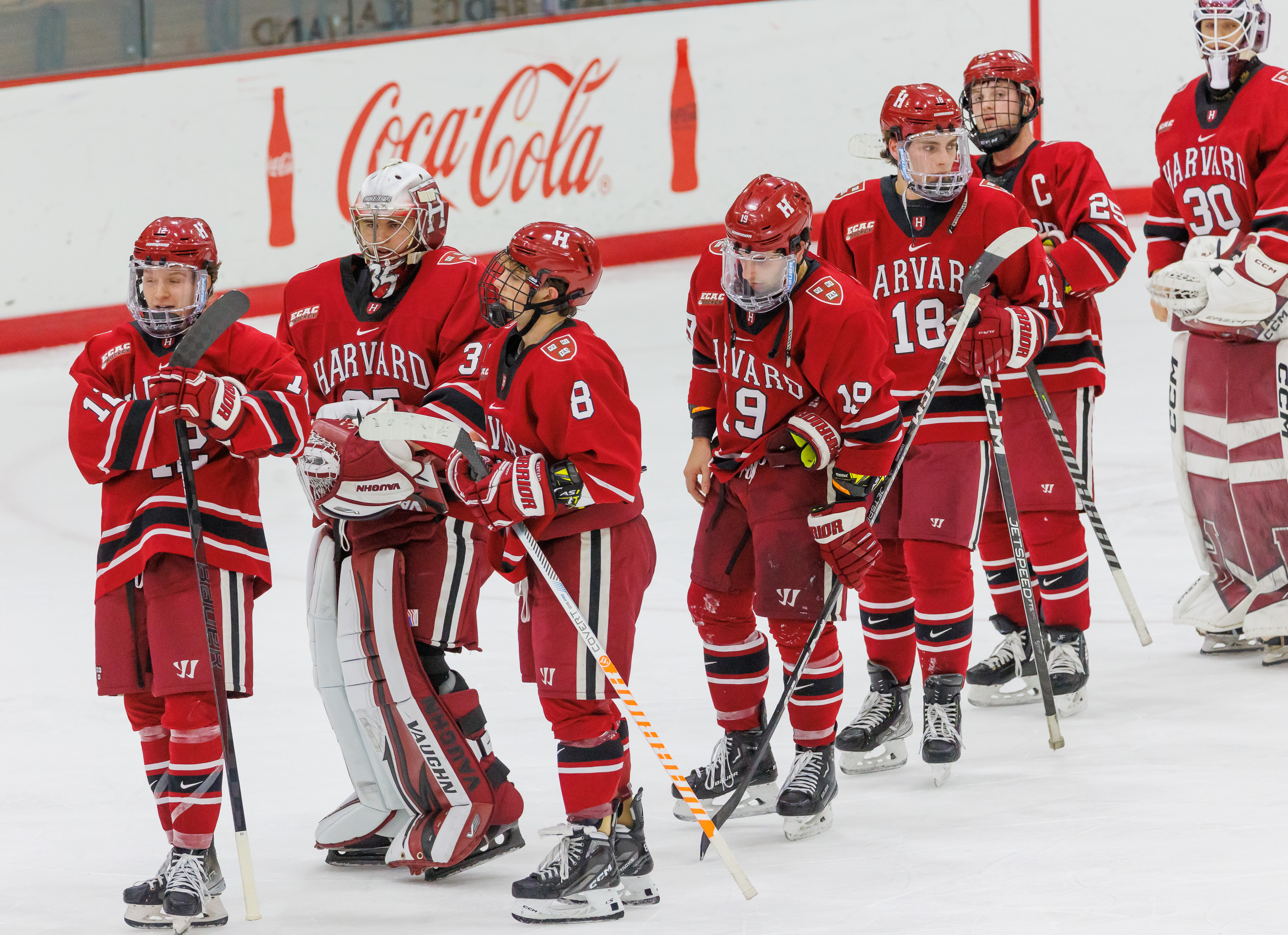
Harvard Crimson

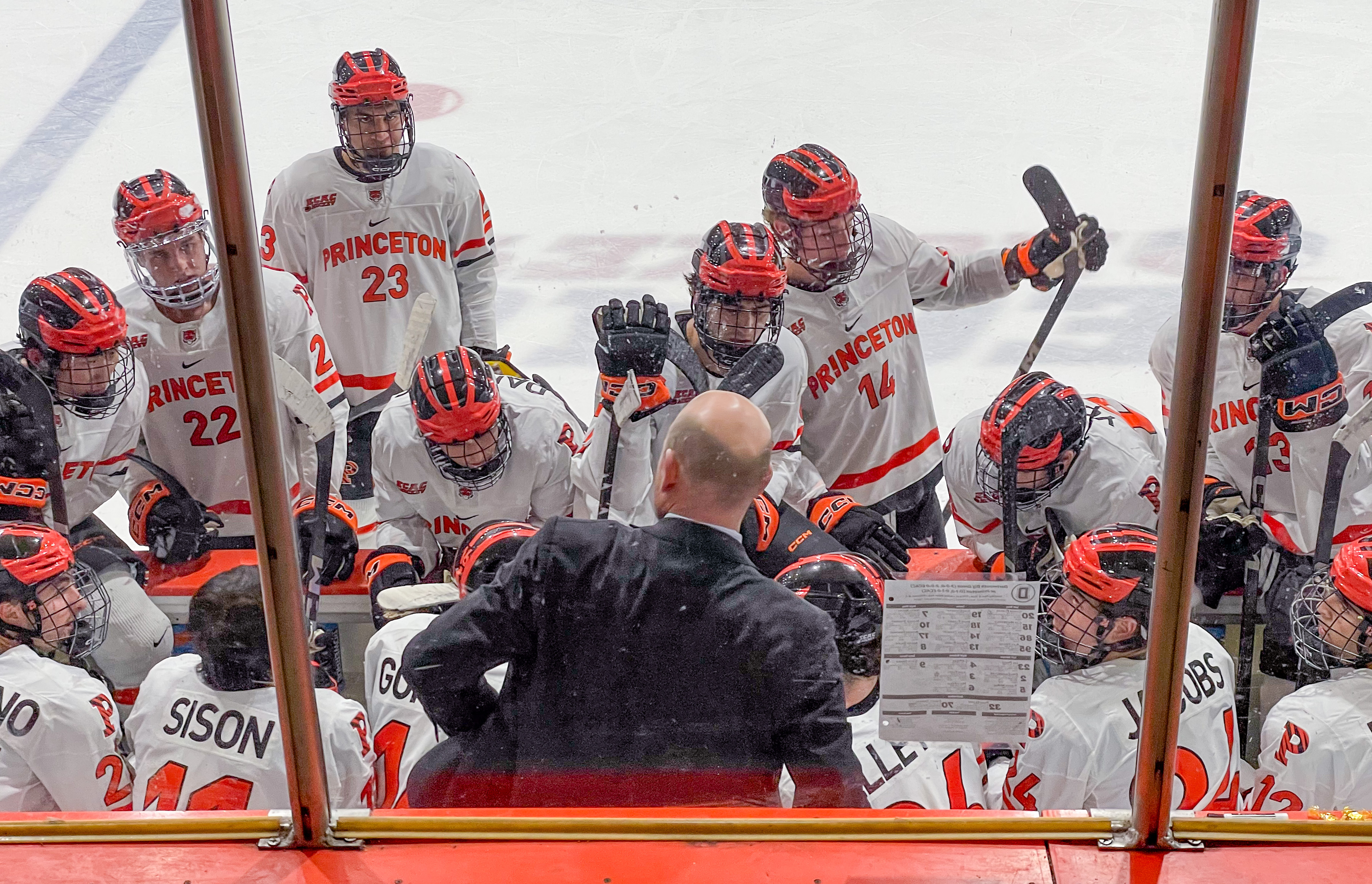
Princeton Tigers

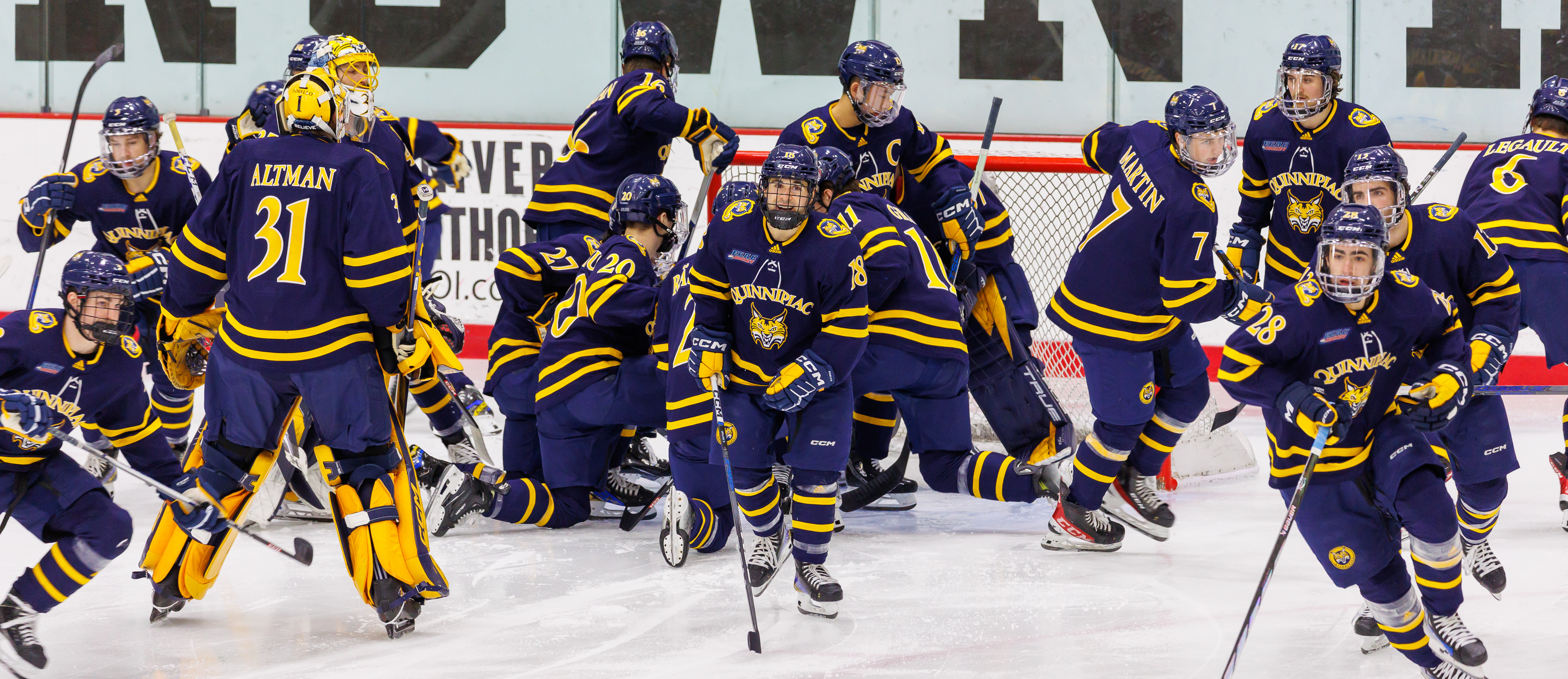
Quinnipiac Bobcats

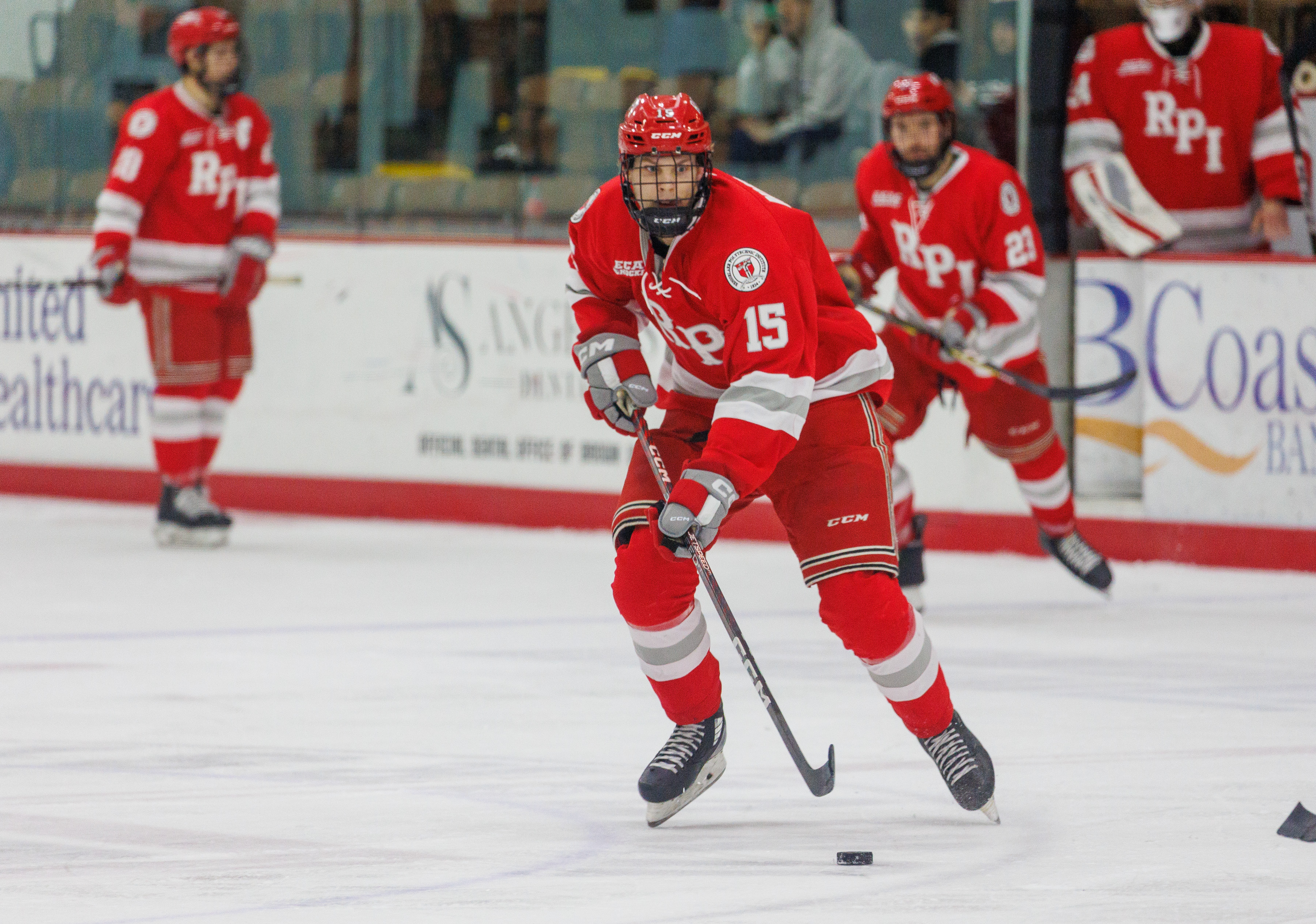
RPI Engineers

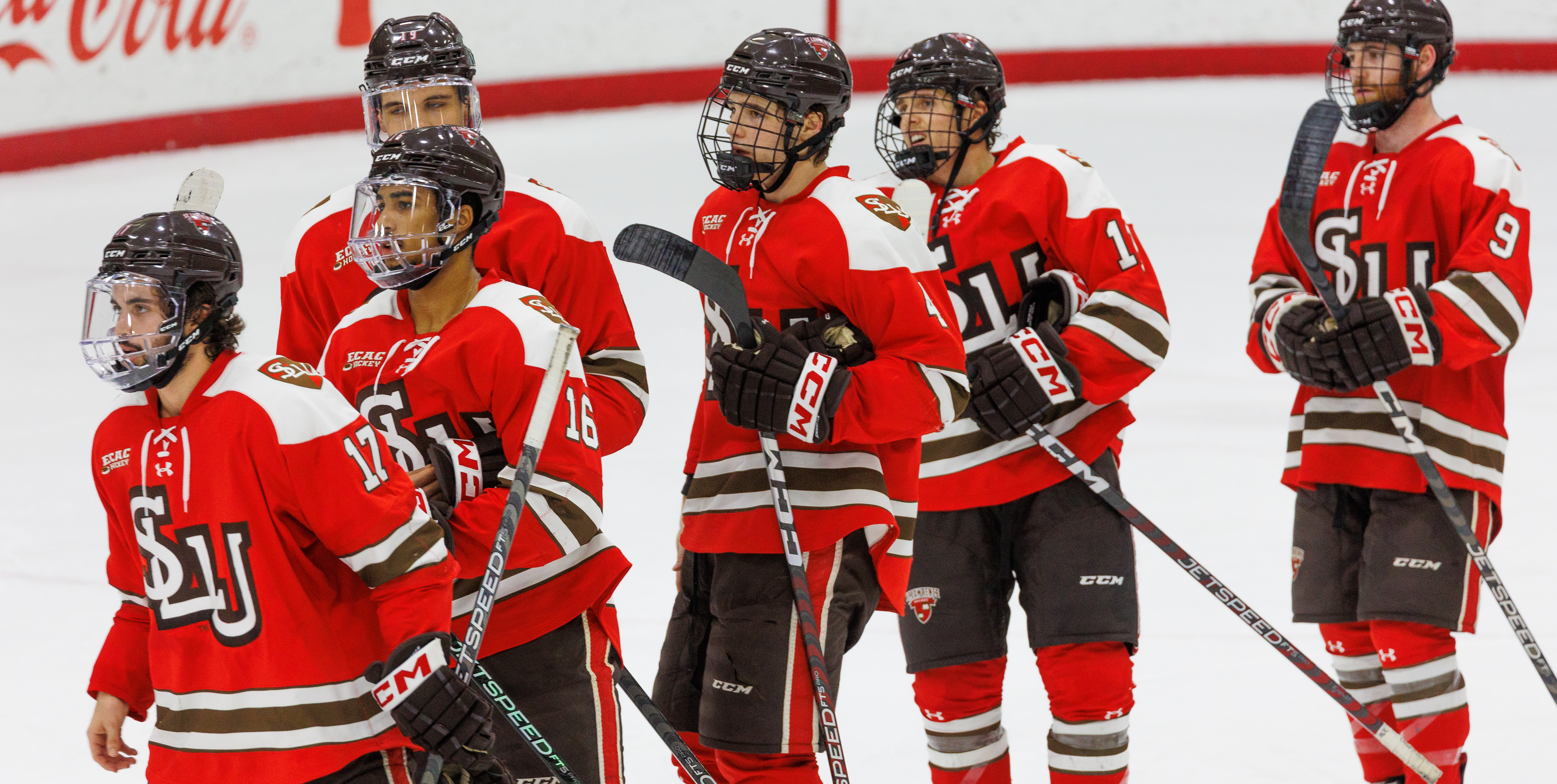
St. Lawrence Saints

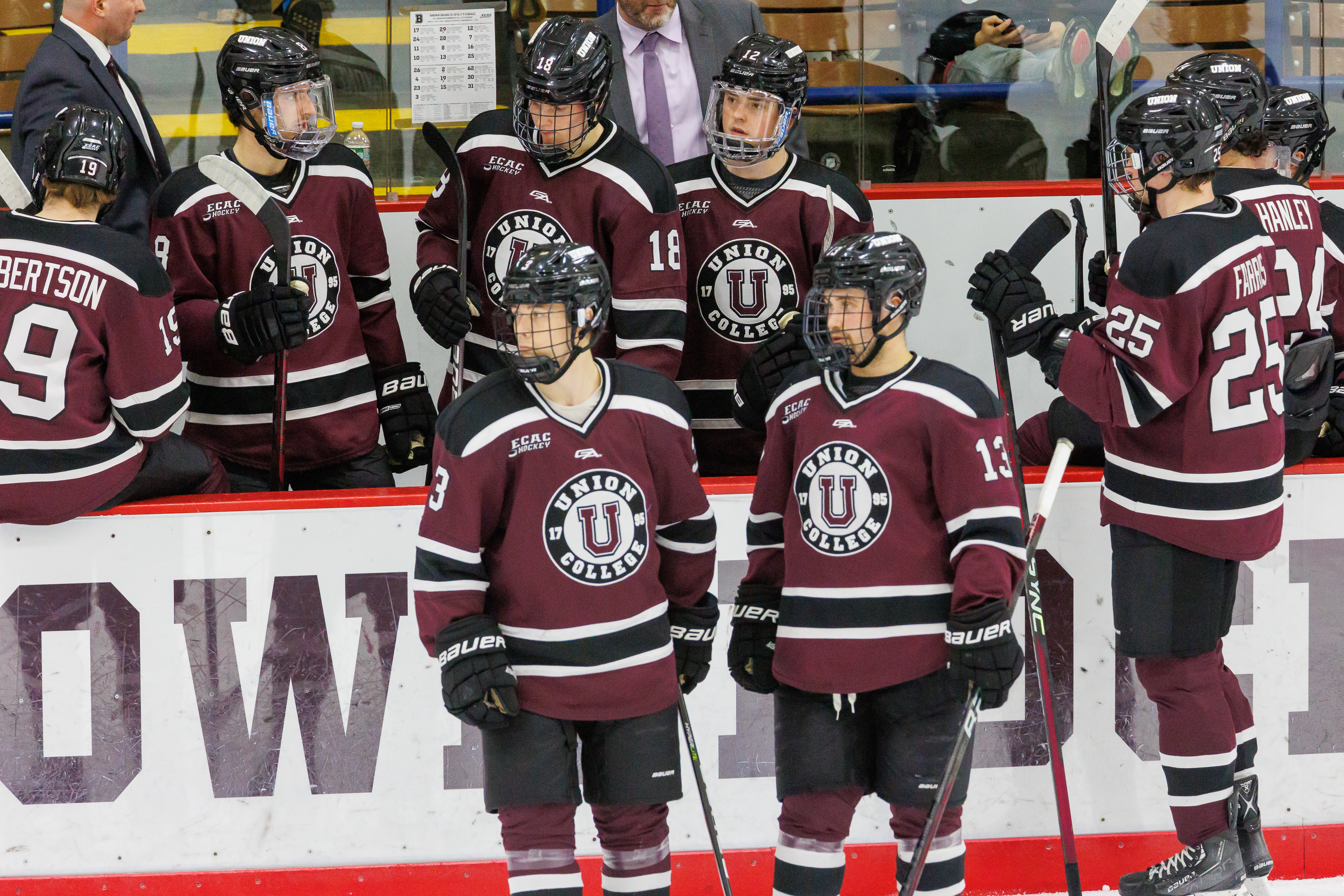
Union Garnet Chargers

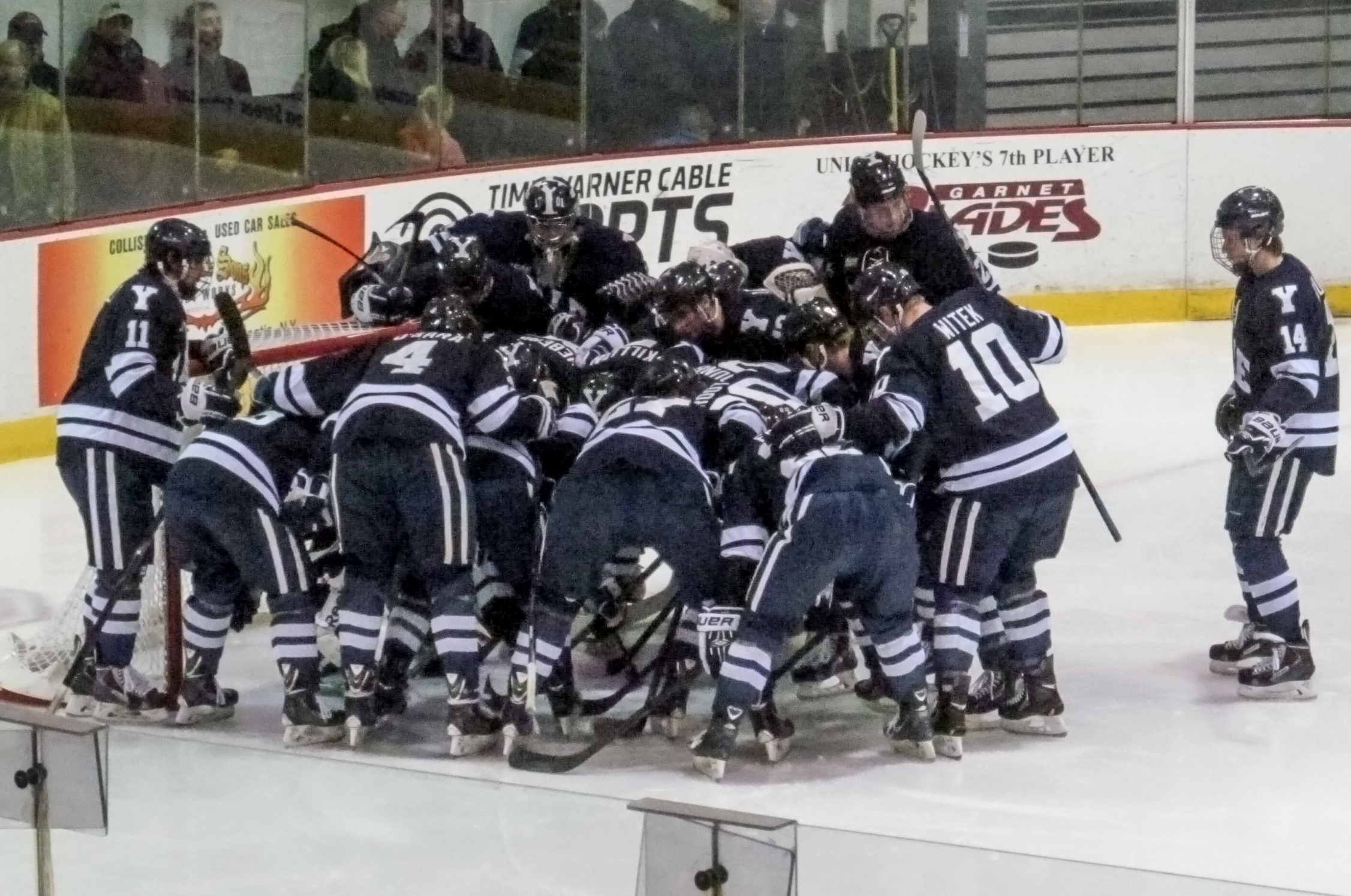
Yale Bulldogs

=== Membership timeline ===
Men Women Both

== Men's tournament sites ==
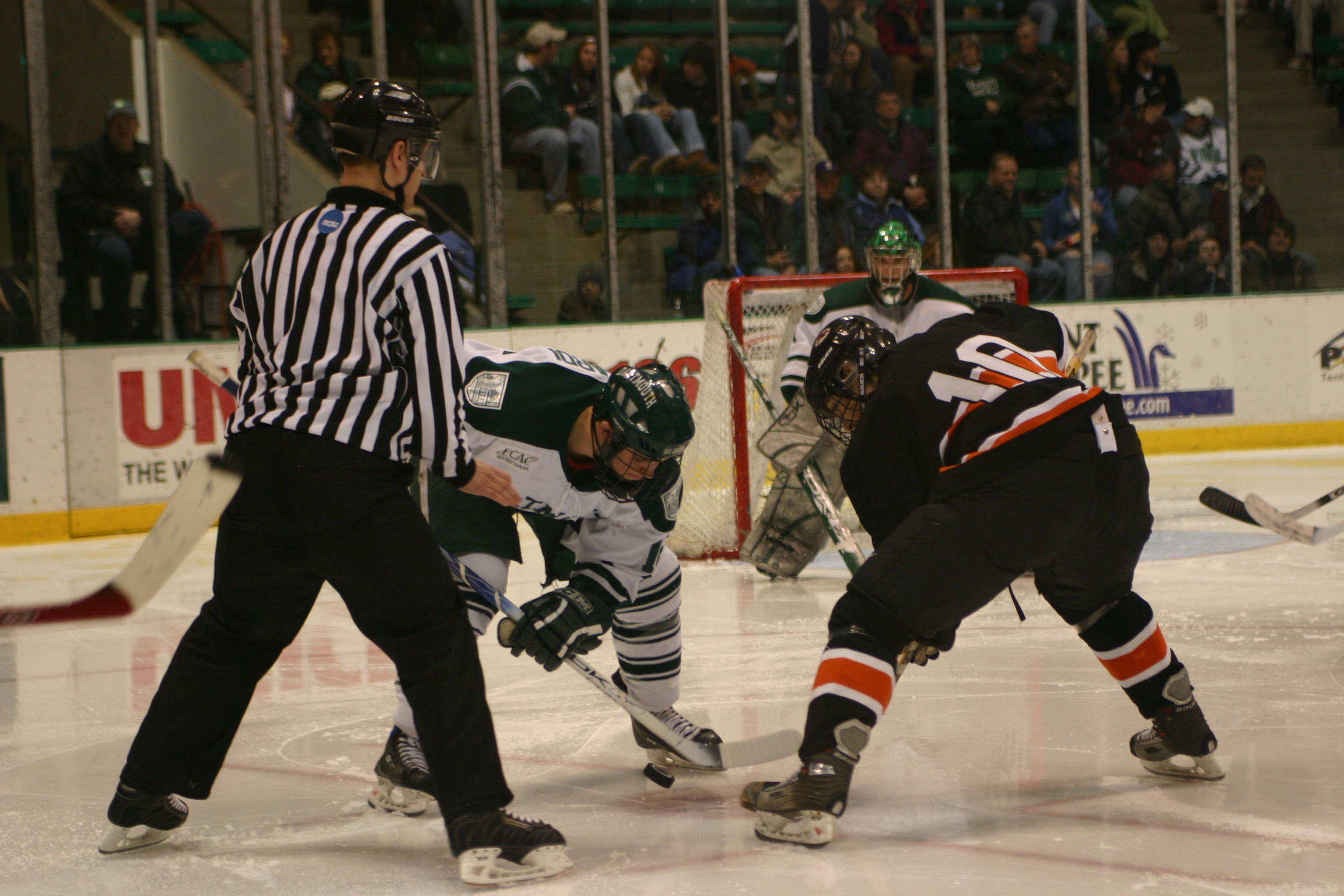
A men's game between Dartmouth and Princeton at Thompson Arena in Hanover

The ECAC Championship Game has been held at the following sites:

- 1962–1966 — Boston Arena (now Matthews Arena), Boston
- 1966–1992 — Boston Garden, Boston
- 1993–2002 — Olympic Center (now Herb Brooks Arena), Lake Placid, New York
- 2003–2010 — Times Union Center (Pepsi Arena through 2006), Albany, New York
- 2011–2013 — Boardwalk Hall, Atlantic City, New Jersey
- 2014–2019 — Herb Brooks Arena, Lake Placid, New York
- 2020 - Canceled due to COVID-19 pandemic
- 2021 - People's United Center, Hamden, Connecticut
- 2022-2026 - Herb Brooks Arena, Lake Placid, New York

The winner of the game is awarded the Whitelaw Cup and receives an automatic bid to the NCAA Men's Division I Hockey Tournament.

== Men's champions ==
=== Championships, Frozen Fours, and NCAA Tournament Appearances ===
School	NCAA Championships	NCAA Runner-Up	NCAA Frozen Fours	NCAA Tournament Appearances	Conference Regular Season Championships	Conference Championships
Brown		1 (1951)	3 (1951, 1965, 1976)	4 (1951, 1965, 1976, 1993)		
Clarkson		3 (1962, 1966, 1970)	7 (1957, 1958, 1962, 1963, 1966, 1970, 1991)	22 (1957, 1958, 1962, 1963, 1966, 1970, 1981, 1982, 1984, 1990-93, 1995-99, 2007, 2008, 2018, 2019)	10 (1966, 1977, 1981, 1982, 1991, 1995, 1997, 1999, 2001, 2008)	6 (1966, 1991, 1993, 1999, 2007, 2019)
Colgate		1 (1990)	1 (1990)	6 (1981, 1990, 2000, 2005, 2014, 2023)	3 (1990, 2004, 2006)	2 (1990, 2023)
Cornell	2 (1967, 1970)	2 (1969, 1972)	8 (1967-70, 1972, 1973, 1980, 2003)	26 (1967-70, 1972, 1973, 1980, 1981, 1986, 1991, 1996, 1997, 2002, 2003, 2005, 2006, 2009, 2010, 2012, 2017-19, 2023-26)	11 (1968-70, 1972, 1973, 2002, 2003, 2005, 2018-20)	14 (1967-70, 1973, 1980, 1986, 1996, 1997, 2003, 2005, 2010, 2024, 2025)
Dartmouth		2 (1948, 1949)	4 (1948, 1949, 1979, 1980)	5 (1948, 1949, 1979, 1980, 2026)	1 (2006)	1 (2026)
Harvard	1 (1989)	2 (1983, 1986)	13 (1955, 1957, 1958, 1969, 1971, 1974, 1975, 1983, 1986, 1987, 1989, 1994, 2017)	27 (1955, 1957, 1958, 1969, 1971, 1974, 1975, 1982, 1983, 1985-89, 1993, 1994, 2002-06, 2015-17, 2019, 2022, 2023)	11 (1963, 1973, 1975, 1986-89, 1992-94, 2017)	11 (1963, 1971, 1983, 1987, 1994, 2002, 2004, 2006, 2015, 2017, 2022)
Princeton				4 (1998, 2008, 2009, 2018)		3 (1998, 2008, 2018)
Quinnipiac	1 (2023)	2 (2013, 2016)	3 (2013, 2016, 2023)	12 (2002, 2013-16, 2019, 2021-26)	12 (1999, 2000, 2013, 2015, 2016, 2019, 2021-26)	2 (2002, 2016)
RPI	2 (1954, 1985)		5 (1953, 1954, 1961, 1964, 1985)	9 (1953, 1954, 1961, 1964, 1984, 1985, 1994, 1995, 2011)	5 (1952-54, 1984, 1985)	3 (1984, 1985, 1995)
St. Lawrence		2 (1961, 1988)	9 (1952, 1955, 1956, 1959-62, 1988, 2000)	17 (1952, 1955, 1956, 1959-62, 1983, 1987-89, 1992, 1999-01, 2007, 2021*)	2 (2000, 2007)	7 (1962, 1988, 1989, 1992, 2000, 2001, 2021)
Union	1 (2014)		2 (2012, 2014)	5 (2011-14, 2017)	4 (2011, 2012, 2014, 2017)	3 (2012-14)
Yale	1 (2013)		2 (1952, 2013)	8 (1952, 1998, 2009-11, 2013, 2015, 2016)	3 (1998, 2009, 2010)	2 (2009, 2011)

=== Men's tournament champions ===
- 1962 St. Lawrence def. Clarkson 5–2
- 1963 Harvard def. Boston College 4–3 (ot)
- 1964 Providence def. St. Lawrence 3–1
- 1965 Boston College def. Brown 6–2
- 1966 Clarkson def. Cornell 6–2
- 1967 Cornell def. Boston University 4–3
- 1968 Cornell def. Boston College 6–3
- 1969 Cornell def. Harvard 4–2
- 1970 Cornell def. Clarkson 3–2
- 1971 Harvard def. Clarkson 7–4
- 1972 Boston University def. Cornell 4–1
- 1973 Cornell def. Boston College 3–2
- 1974 Boston University def. Harvard 4–2
- 1975 Boston University def. Harvard 7–3
- 1976 Boston University def. Brown 9–2
- 1977 Boston University def. New Hampshire 8–6
- 1978 Boston College def. Providence 4–2
- 1979 New Hampshire def. Dartmouth 3–2
- 1980 Cornell def. Dartmouth 5–1
- 1981 Providence def. Cornell 8–4
- 1982 Northeastern def. Harvard 5–2
- 1983 Harvard def. Providence 4–1
- 1984 Rensselaer def. Boston University 5–2
- 1985 Rensselaer def. Harvard 3–1
- 1986 Cornell def. Clarkson 3–2 (ot)
- 1987 Harvard def. St. Lawrence 6–3
- 1988 St. Lawrence def. Clarkson 3–0
- 1989 St. Lawrence def. Vermont 4–1
- 1990 Colgate def. Rensselaer 5–4
- 1991 Clarkson def. St. Lawrence 5–4
- 1992 St. Lawrence def. Cornell 4–2
- 1993 Clarkson def. Brown 3–1
- 1994 Harvard def. Rensselaer 3–0
- 1995 Rensselaer def. Princeton 5–1
- 1996 Cornell def. Harvard 2–1
- 1997 Cornell def. Clarkson 2–1
- 1998 Princeton def. Clarkson 5–4 (2ot)
- 1999 Clarkson def. St. Lawrence 3–2
- 2000 St. Lawrence def. Rensselaer 2–0
- 2001 St. Lawrence def. Cornell 3–1
- 2002 Harvard def. Cornell 4–3 (2ot)
- 2003 Cornell def. Harvard 3–2 (ot)
- 2004 Harvard def. Clarkson 4–2
- 2005 Cornell def. Harvard 3–1
- 2006 Harvard def. Cornell 6–2
- 2007 Clarkson def. Quinnipiac 4–2
- 2008 Princeton def. Harvard 4–1
- 2009 Yale def. Cornell 5–0
- 2010 Cornell def. Union 3–0
- 2011 Yale def. Cornell 6–0
- 2012 Union def. Harvard 3–1
- 2013 Union def. Brown 3–1
- 2014 Union def. Colgate 4–2
- 2015 Harvard def. Colgate 4–2
- 2016 Quinnipiac def. Harvard 4–1
- 2017 Harvard def. Cornell 4–1
- 2018 Princeton def Clarkson 2–1
- 2019 Clarkson def Cornell 3–2 (ot)
- 2020 Tournament Canceled
- 2021 St. Lawrence def Quinnipiac 3–2 (ot)
- 2022 Harvard def Quinnipiac 3-2 (ot)
- 2023 Colgate def Harvard 3-2
- 2024 Cornell def St. Lawrence 3-1
- 2025 Cornell def Clarkson 3-1
- 2026 Dartmouth def Princeton 2-1 (ot)

=== Regular season champion ===
The Cleary Cup, named for former Harvard player and coach Bill Cleary since 2001, is awarded to the team with the best record in league games at the end of the regular–season. There is no tie–breaking procedure should two or more teams end the season with the same record and the trophy is shared. A tie breaking procedure is applied to determine the top seed in the ECAC conference tournament. The Cleary Cup winner is not given any special consideration in the NCAA tournament as the ECAC awards its automatic bid to the winner of the ECAC tournament.

- 1984–85 Rensselaer
- 1985–86 Harvard
- 1986–87 Harvard
- 1987–88 Harvard and St. Lawrence
- 1988–89 Harvard
- 1989–90 Colgate
- 1990–91 Clarkson
- 1991–92 Harvard
- 1992–93 Harvard
- 1993–94 Harvard
- 1994–95 Clarkson
- 1995–96 Vermont
- 1996–97 Clarkson
- 1997–98 Yale
- 1998–99 Clarkson
- 1999–00 St. Lawrence
- 2000–01 Clarkson
- 2001–02 Cornell
- 2002–03 Cornell
- 2003–04 Colgate
- 2004–05 Cornell
- 2005–06 Colgate and Dartmouth
- 2006–07 St. Lawrence
- 2007–08 Clarkson
- 2008–09 Yale
- 2009–10 Yale
- 2010–11 Union
- 2011–12 Union
- 2012–13 Quinnipiac
- 2013–14 Union
- 2014–15 Quinnipiac
- 2015–16 Quinnipiac
- 2016–17 Harvard and Union
- 2017–18 Cornell
- 2018–19 Cornell and Quinnipiac
- 2019–20 Cornell
- 2020–21 Quinnipiac
- 2021–22 Quinnipiac
- 2022–23 Quinnipiac
- 2023–24 Quinnipiac
- 2024–25 Quinnipiac
- 2025–26 Quinnipiac

== Women's champions ==
=== Championships, Frozen Fours, and NCAA Tournament Appearances ===
School	NCAA Championships	NCAA Runner-Up	NCAA Frozen Fours	NCAA Tournament Appearances	Conference Championships	Conference Tournament Championships
Brown		1 (2002)	1 (2002)	1 (2002)	4 (1995, 1996, 1997, 2000)	3 (1998, 2000, 2002)
Clarkson	3 (2014, 2017, 2018)		6 (2014, 2016-19, 2024)	13 (2010, 2013-20, 2022-25)	4 (2014, 2015, 2017, 2018)	3 (2017-19)
Colgate		1 (2018)	2 (2018, 2024)	6 (2018, 2021-25)	3 (2018, 2021, 2024)	4 (2021-24)
Cornell		1 (2010)	5 (2010-12, 2019, 2025)	9 (2010-14, 2017, 2019, 2024, 2025)	7 (2010-13, 2019, 2020, 2025)	5 (2010, 2011, 2013, 2014, 2025)
Dartmouth			4 (2001, 2003-05)	7 (2001, 2003-05, 2007, 2009, 2011)	3 (2001, 2002, 2007)	4 (2001, 2003, 2007, 2009)
Harvard		4 (2003, 2004, 2005, 2015)	6 (2001, 2003-05, 2008, 2015)	12 (2001, 2003-08, 2010, 2013-15, 2022)	8 (1999, 2003-05, 2008, 2009, 2015, 2022)	7 (1999, 2004-08, 2015)
Princeton				3 (2006, 2015, 2019, 2026)	1 (2026)	1 (2020)
Quinnipiac				4 (2015, 2016, 2022, 2023, 2026)		2 (2016, 2026)
RPI						
St. Lawrence		1 (2001)	5 (2001, 2004-07)	11 (2001, 2004-09, 2012, 2017, 2024, 2025)		1 (2012)
Union						
Yale			1 (2022)	2 (2022, 2023, 2026)	2 (2023, 2026)	

=== Women's tournament champions ===
- 1984 Providence def. New Hampshire
- 1985 Providence def. New Hampshire
- 1986 New Hampshire def. Northeastern
- 1987 New Hampshire def. Northeastern
- 1988 Northeastern def. Providence
- 1989 Northeastern def. Providence
- 1990 New Hampshire def. Providence (in Durham, New Hampshire)
- 1991 New Hampshire def. Northeastern (Durham)
- 1992 Providence def. New Hampshire (in Providence, Rhode Island)
- 1993 Providence def. New Hampshire (in Boston)
- 1994 Providence def. Northeastern (Providence)
- 1995 Providence def. New Hampshire (Providence)
- 1996 New Hampshire def. Providence (Durham)
- 1997 Northeastern def. New Hampshire (Boston)
- 1998 Brown def. New Hampshire (Boston)
- 1999 Harvard def. New Hampshire (Providence)
- 2000 Brown def. Dartmouth (Providence)
- 2001 Dartmouth def. Harvard (in Hanover, New Hampshire)
- 2002 Brown def. Dartmouth (Hanover)
- 2003 Dartmouth def. Harvard (Providence)
- 2004 Harvard def. St. Lawrence (in Schenectady, New York)
- 2005 Harvard def. Dartmouth (Schenectady)
- 2006 Harvard def. Brown (in Canton, New York)
- 2007 Dartmouth def. St. Lawrence (Hanover)
- 2008 Harvard def. St. Lawrence (Boston)
- 2009 Dartmouth def. Rensselaer (Boston)
- 2010 Cornell def. Clarkson (in Ithaca, New York)
- 2011 Cornell def. Dartmouth (Ithaca)
- 2012 St. Lawrence def. Cornell (Ithaca)
- 2013 Cornell def. Harvard (Ithaca)
- 2014 Cornell def. Clarkson (in Potsdam, New York)
- 2015 Harvard def. Cornell (Potsdam)
- 2016 Quinnipiac def. Clarkson (Hamden, Connecticut)
- 2017 Clarkson def. Cornell (Potsdam)
- 2018 Clarkson def. Colgate (Potsdam)
- 2019 Clarkson def. Cornell (Ithaca)
- 2020 Princeton def. Cornell (Ithaca)
- 2021 Colgate def. St. Lawrence (Hamilton)
- 2022 Colgate def. Yale (New Haven)
- 2023 Colgate def. Clarkson (New Haven)
- 2024 Colgate def. Clarkson (Hamilton)
- 2025 Cornell def. Colgate (Ithaca)
- 2026 Quinnipiac def. Yale (Herb Brooks Arena, Lake Placid, NY)

== Men's conference records ==
Team's records against current conference opponents. (As of the end of the 2018-19 season.)

School	Brown			Clarkson			Colgate			Cornell			Dartmouth			Harvard			Princeton			Quinnipiac			Rensselaer			St. Lawrence			Union			Yale			Total			
School	W	L	T	W	L	T	W	L	T	W	L	T	W	L	T	W	L	T	W	L	T	W	L	T	W	L	T	W	L	T	W	L	T	W	L	T	W	L	T	Win%
Brown				19	68	9	25	58	8	43	80	7	69	83	8	47	116	13	90	72	12	10	24	6	30	63	9	30	48	13	25	23	14	77	102	8	452	727	103	.396
Clarkson	68	19	9				88	53	18	56	67	17	73	31	7	57	58	12	84	34	7	12	16	3	99	51	11	127	72	11	33	27	5	76	40	8	771	468	109	.612
Colgate	58	25	8	53	88	18				58	84	15	51	51	7	25	56	8	59	48	8	16	23	2	63	65	5	72	80	5	44	29	4	51	51	6	550	600	86	.480
Cornell	80	43	8	67	56	18	84	58	15				83	49	6	78	66	11	91	53	8	22	17	4	63	38	11	64	45	8	43	22	9	85	61	8	760	508	106	.592
Dartmouth	83	69	8	31	73	7	51	51	7	49	83	6				66	139	13	104	89	16	10	21	2	42	46	6	42	61	4	26	31	7	98	112	15	603	775	91	.441
Harvard	116	47	13	58	57	12	56	25	8	66	78	11	139	67	13				157	59	12	15	14	5	58	37	8	62	44	7	34	17	6	144	91	22	905	536	117	.618
Princeton	72	90	11	34	84	7	48	59	8	53	91	8	89	104	16	58	158	12				12	17	1	36	68	11	25	70	11	25	36	7	109	141	11	562	919	103	.387
Quinnipiac	24	10	6	16	12	3	23	16	2	17	22	4	21	10	2	14	15	5	17	12	1				17	7	9	15	15	4	18	17	5	22	7	5	204	143	46	.578
Rensselaer	63	30	9	51	97	11	65	63	5	38	63	11	46	42	6	37	58	8	69	37	11	7	17	9				60	83	7	53	40	11	57	52	6	546	582	94	.485
St. Lawrence	48	30	13	72	127	11	80	72	5	45	64	17	61	42	4	44	62	7	70	25	11	15	15	4	83	60	7				38	29	3	64	41	11	620	567	93	.521
Union	23	25	14	27	33	5	29	44	4	22	43	9	31	26	7	17	34	6	36	25	7	17	18	5	40	53	11	29	38	3				27	27	5	298	366	76	.454
Yale	102	77	8	40	76	8	51	51	6	61	85	8	112	98	15	91	144	22	141	109	11	7	22	5	52	57	6	41	64	11	27	27	5				725	810	105	.474

- Harvard and Princeton both record a loss on January 4, 1941. The game was played in Princeton with the score either 5–3 Harvard or 6–2 Princeton.

== Conference arenas ==
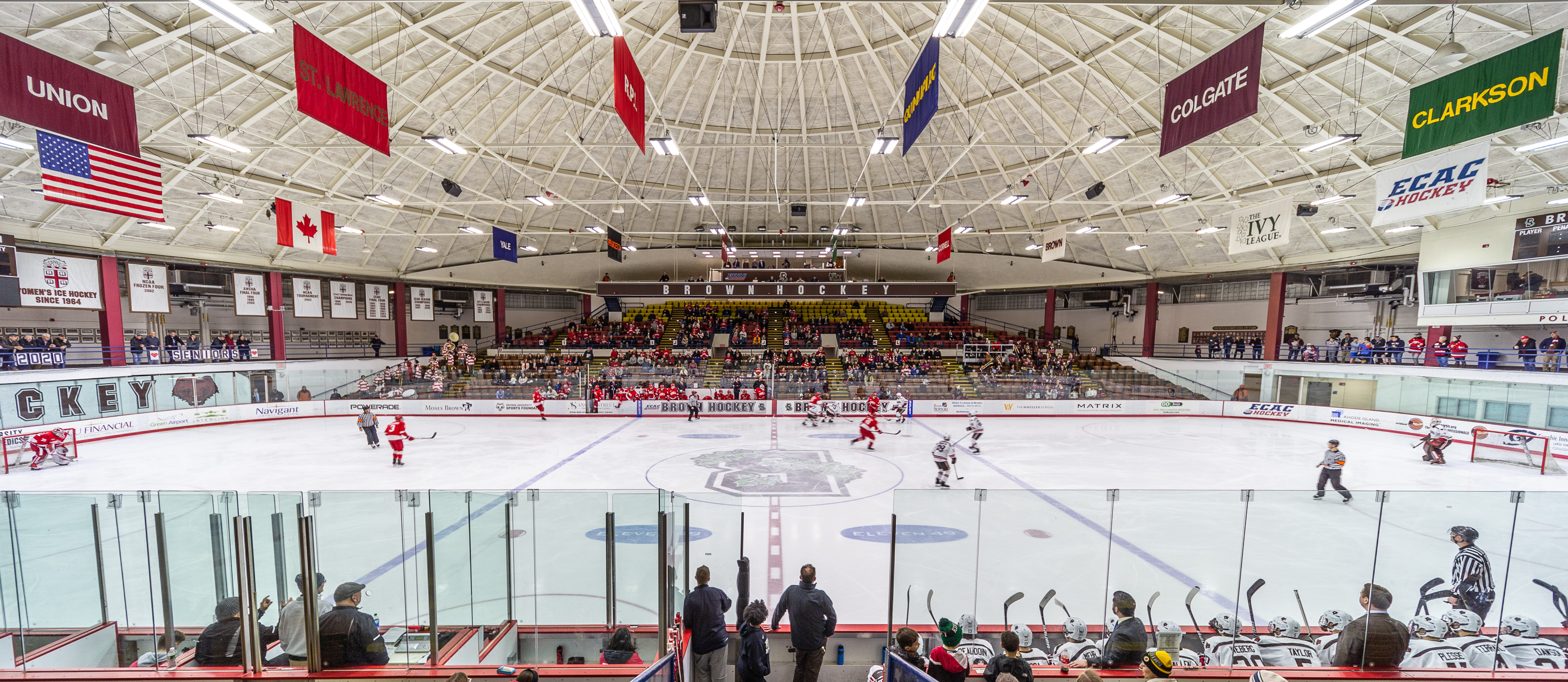
Meehan Auditorium, February 22, 2020.

School	Hockey arena (built)	Capacity
Brown	George V. Meehan Auditorium (1962)	3,100
Clarkson	Cheel Arena (1991)	3,000
Colgate	Class of 1965 Arena (2016)	2,222
Cornell	Lynah Rink (1957)	4,267
Dartmouth	Rupert C. Thompson Arena (1975)	3,500
Harvard	Bright-Landry Hockey Center (1956/1979)	3,095
Princeton	Hobey Baker Memorial Rink (1923)	2,092
Quinnipiac	M&T Bank Arena (2007)	3,386
Rensselaer	Houston Field House (1949)	4,780
St. Lawrence	Appleton Arena (1951)	2,300
Union	M&T Bank Center (2025)	2,200
Yale	David S. Ingalls Rink (1958)	3,500

== Awards ==
=== Men's ===
At the conclusion of each regular season schedule, the coaches of each ECAC team vote on which players they think should be on the four All-Conference teams: first team and second team (rookie team starting in 1987–88 and third team beginning in 2005–06). Additionally, they vote to award 8 individual trophies to eligible players. ECAC Hockey also determines a Conference Tournament Most Outstanding Player and an All-Tournament Team, both of which are voted on at the conclusion of the conference tournament.

=== All-Conference teams ===
Award	Inaugural year
First Team	1961–62
Second Team	1961–62
Third Team	2005–06
Rookie Team	1987–88
All-Tournament Team	1962*

=== Individual awards ===
Award	Inaugural year
Player of the Year	1961–62
Rookie of the Year	1961–62
Tim Taylor Award	1986–87
Best Defensive Defenseman	1961–62*
Best Defensive Forward	1992–93
Ken Dryden Award	1995–96
Student-Athlete of the Year	2006–07
Wayne Dean Sportsmanship Award	2022–23 ^{†}
Most Outstanding Player in Tournament	1962

† Open to both men and women.

Because the 'Best Defensive Defenseman' award was retired from 1967–68 thru 1991–92

and the All-Tournament Team was discontinued from 1973 thru 1988, they both have asterisks in the above table.

== NCAA Records ==
- In 2000, St. Lawrence University won the second longest game in NCAA tournament history. St. Lawrence defeated Boston University in quadruple overtime by a score of 3–2. Currently, this game is the fifth longest game in NCAA Division I history.
- On March 4, 2006, Union College played host to the longest NCAA men's ice hockey game in NCAA history. In Game 2 of the first round of the 2006 ECACHL Tournament (best of three series) between Yale University and Union, Yale won 3–2 1:35 into the 5th overtime. Overall, the game took 141:35 to decide the winner.
- On March 11, 2010, Quinnipiac defeated Union College 3–2. The game, which lasted 150 minutes and 22 seconds, set a new record for the longest hockey game in NCAA history. The record lasted until March 6, 2015 when a Hockey East playoff game between UMass and Notre Dame lasted just over a minute longer.
- Cornell University recorded the only undefeated and untied season for a Division I NCAA champion in 1970.
