= 1970–71 Boston University Terriers men's ice hockey season =

National champion Boston Arena Christmas Tournament, champion Beanpot, champion ECAC Hockey, champion NCAA tournament, champion
- Conference: 1st ECAC Hockey
- Home ice: Boston Arena

Record
- Overall: 28–2–1
- Conference: 18–1–1
- Home: 13–0–0
- Road: 8–1–1
- Neutral: 7–1

Coaches and captains
- Head coach: Jack Kelley
- Assistant coaches: Bob Crocker
- Captain: Steve Stirling

The 1970–71 Boston University Terriers men's ice hockey team represented Boston University in college ice hockey. In its 9th year under head coach Jack Kelley the team compiled a 28–2–1 record and reached the NCAA tournament for the seventh time. The Terriers defeated Minnesota 4–2 in the championship game at the Onondaga War Memorial in Syracuse, New York to win the national championship.

== Season ==
=== Early Season ===
After a very good season in 1970, BU set their sights firmly on improving over their third place ECAC finish. Jack Kelley's Terriers opened the season in St. Louis, playing the new varsity team for Saint Louis University. Not surprisingly, the experienced easterners dominated the Billikens, winning both games by a combined score of 17–1. The squad returned home for their next contest three days later, defeating Brown soundly before hitting the road again (through not traveling nearly as far away as their first two games). After dropping New Hampshire BU faced Harvard in their first big test on the season and the two teams fought to a 4–4 draw. The Terriers returned to their home rink to take on two non-conference opponents and thoroughly dispatched both. First was College Division Merrimack followed by a down Minnesota team ten days later. BU Shut out both opponents and glided into their winter break with a 6–0–1 record.

=== Christmas Tournament ===
At the end of December BU played host in the Boston Arena Christmas Tournament for the 17th and final time. In the first game the Terriers dropped a good Providence team then beat the independent Notre Dame team 7–3 to claim the championship.

After the calendar changed to 1971, BU welcomed Princeton to the Boston Arena with the second-largest shutout victory in program history (14–0). After travelling across town to defeat arch-rival Boston College the Terriers returned home to face Northeastern on their shared rink. The Huskies were no match for Boston University and Kelley's boys posted their fifth shutout of the season.

After brushing off another College Division program, this time in the form of Bowling Green, BU hosted Dartmouth and trounced the Big Green 13–4, their sixth win by at least 8 goals in only 14 games.

=== First Blemish ===
In late January BU left New England for the first time in almost two months to face defending national champion Cornell. Cornell had not lost at home in over four years and, despite their best efforts, the first-place Terriers were unable to end the Big Red's streak, suffering their first loss of the season 1–5. BU took their frustrations out on Providence to begin another winning streak, defeating four conference opponents in quick succession (including second-place Clarkson) to head into the Beanpot narrowly holding onto the top spot in the ECAC.

BU's first opponent in the Beanpot was a very weak Northeastern team and the match was more or less a repeat of the first meeting between the two with the Terriers winning 12–2. Kelley's team played three games during the two-week break and won all three contests by a 5-goal margin. When the time came for the championship BU was able to hold Harvard to a single goal and won their second consecutive Beanpot.

=== ECAC Tournament ===
The Terriers finished their regular season with two more wins, finishing with an 18–1–1 ECAC record while possessing the top offense and #2 defense in the 17-team conference. BU played host to Rensselaer in the conference quarterfinals and won the match easily, 11–0. When the tournament shifted to the Boston Garden BU faced Harvard in the semifinal and disaster struck, for the fourth year in a row the Terriers lost in the conference semis, losing 2–4 to their cross-town rivals. Ordinarily that would have meant that BU would not have an opportunity to make the NCAA tournament but because that was only the Terriers' second loss of the season there was a small chance that the selection committee would choose BU as the second eastern seed. To give them a better shot at the tournament the Terriers would have to defeat Cornell in the third place game.

Cornell got off to a fast start, scoring less than four minutes into the game but BU was able to tie the match in less than two minutes. The two teams exchanged goals three more times before the first period was over and Cornell led 3–2 after one. The Terriers tied the game early in the second and then Cornell got into penalty trouble. BU score two power play goals in a 5-minute span and took a 5–3 lead before Cornell got their own man-advantage marker with three minutes left in the second. BU reestablished the 2-goal margin 33 seconds later but the Big Red were able to cut close the gap with 14 seconds left in the middle frame. After allowing the fifth goal on 31 shots, Kelley pulled starter Dan Brady in favor of Tim Regan and the later responded by putting up a wall in front of the BU net. Cornell fired a further 13 shots in the third period but Regan turned away everything and BU skated to a 6–5 win and a third-place finish in the ECAC tournament, the team's first win over the Big Red in 45 years.

Unfortunately for BU, Harvard won the ECAC tournament, meaning that the selection committee would be choosing between runner-up Clarkson (28–4–1) and third-place BU (26–2–1). However, with BU having defeated the Golden Knights back on February 5 (the two team's only meeting), and Clarkson having lost to Bowling Green the committee chose to give the Terriers the nod.

=== NCAA tournament ===
Boston University returned to the national tournament after 4 years on the outside and faced Denver in the semifinal. BU had lost each of their previous four meetings but this year was different and the Terriers managed to triumph over the western powerhouse 4–2. BU reached the championship for the first time and met Minnesota for the second time that season. The Golden Gophers were the first team to reach the title tilt with a losing record (and remain the only squad to do so as of 2019) and had been relying on strong goaltending from Dennis Erickson from the start of postseason play. BU opened the scoring just past the five-minute mark with a power play goal from team captain Steve Stirling and shortly thereafter a slapshot from Bob Brown caught Erickson in an unprotected part of his knee and injured the goaltender. After an extended pause in the game Erickson remained in the game and continued to play well but allowed another goal before the first had ended and a second goal to Stirling on a breakaway in the middle frame. Brady, the BU starter, faced almost as many shots in the game but looked calm in the net, turning aside the 23 shots he faced through two periods.

In the third BU played a much more defensive game and limited Minnesota's chances. The game was beginning to look like another shutout for the terriers until Mike LaGarde was called for holding. While the Terriers managed to kill off the disadvantage the Golden Gophers continued to keep the pressure on and scored 5 seconds after the penalty had expired. With momentum having swung in their direction Minnesota went on the attack but Brady stood tall and kept the put out of the BU net. With just over two minutes remaining BU found themselves on a two-on-one and Ron Anderson was able to give the Terriers a three-goal lead. Dean Blais would score Minnesota's second goal with 16 seconds left in the contest but the game was effectively over and BU won their first national championship.

Dan Brady was named as the Tournament MOP (the first American so honored since Barry Urbanski in 1960) and was named to the All-Tournament Team with Bob Brown, Don Cahoon and Steve Stirling. Both Brown and Stirling were named to the AHCA All-American East Team and were joined by John Danby on the All-ECAC Hockey First Team while Ric Jordan made the Second Team. Brown was also awarded the ECAC Hockey Rookie of the Year, an obvious choice perhaps with Brown having led all defensemen in scoring.

== Standings ==
1970–71 ECAC Hockey standings
	Conference							Overall					
	GP	W	L	T	Pct.	GF	GA	GP	W	L	T	GF	GA
Boston University†	20	18	1	1	.925	139	42	31	28	2	1	210	60
Clarkson	19	16	2	1	.868	76	38	33	28	4	1	151	75
Cornell	20	17	3	0	.850	111	44	27	22	5	0	159	63
Harvard*	21	15	5	1	.738	124	55	27	18	8	1	146	74
Brown	19	13	6	0	.684	70	63	24	13	10	0	77	87
Providence	19	12	7	0	.632	94	70	28	17	11	0	141	106
Pennsylvania	19	11	8	0	.579	90	74	25	14	11	0	129	93
Rensselaer	14	7	5	2	.571	119	81	25	16	7	2	125	95
New Hampshire	20	11	9	0	.550	119	92	29	20	9	0	210	112
Boston College	21	9	12	0	.429	92	112	26	11	15	0	121	141
Army	11	3	7	1	.318	32	48	23	8	14	1	81	80
St. Lawrence	17	5	12	0	.294	57	73	24	10	14	0	105	97
Dartmouth	21	6	15	0	.286	76	106	24	9	15	0	96	114
Yale	20	5	15	0	.250	64	105	24	6	17	1	74	127
Colgate	17	4	13	0	.235	54	111	24	7	17	0	87	156
Northeastern	19	3	16	0	.158	35	122	29	7	22	0	77	175
Princeton	21	1	20	0	.048	54	140	23	1	22	0	56	155
Championship: Harvard † indicates conference regular season champion * indicates conference tournament champion

== Schedule ==
Date	Opponent^{#}	Rank^{#}	Site	Result	Record
Regular Season
November 27	at Saint Louis*		St. Louis Arena • St. Louis, Missouri	W 8–0	1–0
November 29	at Saint Louis*		St. Louis Arena • St. Louis, Missouri	W 9–1	2–0
December 2	vs. Brown		Boston Arena • Boston, Massachusetts	W 5–1	3–0 (1–0)
December 5	at New Hampshire		Snively Arena • Durham, New Hampshire	W 6–1	4–0 (2–0)
December 9	at Harvard		Donald C. Watson Rink • Boston, Massachusetts	T 4–4 ^{OT}	4–0–1 (2–0–1)
December 12	vs. Merrimack*		Boston Arena • Boston, Massachusetts	W 8–0	5–0–1 (2–0–1)
December 22	at Minnesota		Boston Arena • Boston, Massachusetts	W 6–0	6–0–1 (2–0–1)
Boston Arena Christmas Tournament
December 28	vs. Providence		Boston Arena • Boston, Massachusetts (Boston Arena Christmas Tournament)	W 4–1	7–0–1 (3–0–1)
December 29	vs. Notre Dame*		Boston Arena • Boston, Massachusetts (Boston Arena Christmas Tournament)	W 7–3	8–0–1 (3–0–1)
January 4	vs. Princeton		Boston Arena • Boston, Massachusetts	W 14–0	9–0–1 (4–0–1)
January 9	at Boston College		McHugh Forum • Chestnut Hill, Massachusetts	W 8–3	10–0–1 (5–0–1)
January 13	vs. Northeastern		Boston Arena • Boston, Massachusetts	W 9–0	11–0–1 (6–0–1)
January 16	vs. Bowling Green*		Boston Arena • Boston, Massachusetts	W 6–1	12–0–1 (6–0–1)
January 20	vs. Dartmouth		Boston Arena • Boston, Massachusetts	W 13–4	13–0–1 (7–0–1)
January 23	at Cornell		Lynah Rink • Ithaca, New York	L 1–5	13–1–1 (7–1–1)
January 27	at Providence		Rhode Island Auditorium • Providence, Rhode Island	W 7–1	14–1–1 (8–1–1)
January 30	vs. St. Lawrence		Boston Arena • Boston, Massachusetts	W 6–3	15–1–1 (9–1–1)
February 3	at Yale		Ingalls Rink • New Haven, Connecticut	W 5–1	16–1–1 (10–1–1)
February 5	vs. Clarkson		Boston Arena • Boston, Massachusetts	W 4–1	17–1–1 (11–1–1)
Beanpot
February 8	vs. Northeastern		Boston Garden • Boston, Massachusetts (Beanpot Semifinal)	W 12–2	18–1–1 (12–1–1)
February 13	vs. New Hampshire		Boston Arena • Boston, Massachusetts	W 8–3	19–1–1 (13–1–1)
February 16	vs. Boston College		Boston Arena • Boston, Massachusetts	W 9–4	20–1–1 (14–1–1)
February 19	at Rensselaer		Houston Field House • Troy, New York	W 7–2	21–1–1 (15–1–1)
February 22	vs. Harvard		Boston Garden • Boston, Massachusetts (Beanpot championship)	W 4–1	22–1–1 (16–1–1)
February 27	vs. Providence		Boston Arena • Boston, Massachusetts	W 6–3	23–1–1 (17–1–1)
March 5	at Colgate		Starr Rink • Hamilton, New York	W 7–2	24–1–1 (18–1–1)
ECAC Hockey Tournament
March 9	vs. Rensselaer*		Boston Arena • Boston, Massachusetts (ECAC Quarterfinal)	W 11–0	25–1–1 (18–1–1)
March 13	vs. Harvard*		Boston Garden • Boston, Massachusetts (ECAC Semifinal)	L 2–4	25–2–1 (18–1–1)
March 14	vs. Cornell*		Boston Garden • Boston, Massachusetts (ECAC Third Place Game)	W 6–5	26–2–1 (18–1–1)
NCAA tournament
March 19	vs. Denver*		Onondaga War Memorial • Syracuse, New York (National Semifinal)	W 4–2	27–2–1 (18–1–1)
March 21	vs. Minnesota*		Onondaga War Memorial • Syracuse, New York (National championship)	W 4–2	28–2–1 (18–1–1)
*Non-conference game. ^{#}Rankings from USCHO.com Poll. Source:

== Roster and scoring statistics ==
No.	Name	Year	Position	Hometown	S/P/C	Games	Goals	Assists	Pts	PIM
9	Steve Stirling	Senior	C	Clarkson, ON	(Ontario)	31	27	43	70	20
12	John Danby	Junior	C	Port Credit, ON	(Ontario)	31	28	36	64	10
2	Bob Brown	Sophomore	D	Scarborough, ON	(Ontario)	31	17	43	60	38
7	Ric Jordan	Sophomore	D	Mississauga, ON	(Ontario)	30	12	38	50	55
21	Don Cahoon	Junior	W	Marblehead, MA	(Massachusetts)	31	24	20	44	20
19	Ron Anderson	Sophomore	W	Moncton, NB	(New Brunswick)	31	20	21	41	17
11	Wayne Gowing	Senior	W	Kitchener, ON	(Ontario)	31	16	24	40	6
17	Bob Gryp	Junior	W	Merlin, ON	(Ontario)	30	20	19	39	51
18	Steve Dolloff	Sophomore	C	Melrose, MA	(Massachusetts)	31	15	22	37	8
16	Guy Burrowes	Junior	W	Niagara Falls, ON	(Ontario)	31	9	23	32	18
8	Paul Giandomenico	Junior	W	Walpole, MA	(Massachusetts)	30	9	15	24	8
20	Bob Murray	Junior	D	Quincy, MA	(Massachusetts)	31	3	13	16	54
27	Mike LaGarde	Junior	D	Roxboro, PQ	(Quebec)	26	2	13	15	38
25	Peter Thornton	Sophomore	W	Scarborough, ON	(Ontario)	15	5	7	12	10
4	Peter Yetten	Senior	D	Waltham, MA	(Massachusetts)	27	0	9	9	16
23	Larry Abbott	Sophomore	D	Melrose, MA	(Massachusetts)	20	1	3	4	4
5	Bill Flynn	Sophomore	W	Stoneham, MA	(Massachusetts)	18	0	3	3	4
10	Ray Cornoyea	Sophomore	W	Chippawa, ON	(Ontario)	14	2	0	2	0
14	Olivier Prechac	Sophomore	W	Versailles, Fr	(France)	5	0	2	2	2
24	Dave Warner	Sophomore	D	Niagara Falls, ON	(Ontario)	1	0	0	0	0
3	Bill Fenwick	Junior	D	Komoka, ON	(Ontario)	0	-	-	-	-
15	Bruce Hatton	Senior	W	Sudbury, MA	(Massachusetts)	0	-	-	-	-
1	Stefan Brueckner	Junior	G	Buena Park, CA	(California)	1	0	0	0	0
1	Tim Regan	Junior	G	Providence, RI	(Rhode Island)	14	0	0	0	0
30	Dan Brady	Junior	G	Canton, NY	(New York (state))	18	0	0	0	0
Total										

== Goaltending statistics ==
No.	Name	Games	Minutes	Wins	Losses	Ties	Goals Against	Saves	Shut Outs	SV %	GAA
1	Stefan Brueckner	1	60				1	12	0	.923	1.00
1	Tim Regan	14	780				23	299		.929	1.77
30	Dan Brady	18	1060				36	396		.917	2.04
Total		31		28	2	1	60	707	6	.922	1.92

== 1971 championship game ==
=== (E2) Boston University vs. (W2) Minnesota ===
March 20	Boston University	4 – 2	Minnesota	Onondaga War Memorial

Scoring summary
Period	Team	Goal	Assist(s)	Time	Score
1st	BU	Steve Stirling - PP	Danby and Brown	5:32	1–0 BU
1st	BU	Bob Gryp	Gowing	10:10	2–0 BU
2nd	BU	Steve Stirling - GW	unassisted	29:13	3–0 BU
3rd	MIN	Doug Peltier	Sarner and McIntosh	53:07	3–1 BU
3rd	BU	Ron Anderson	Dolloff and Brown	57:45	4–1 BU
3rd	MIN	Dean Blais	McIntosh	59:44	4–2 BU
Penalty summary
Period	Team	Player	Penalty	Time	PIM
1st	MIN	Frank Sanders	Charging	5:01	2:00
1st	BU	Bob Murray	Holding	14:18	2:00
2nd	BU	Mike LaGarde	High–Sticking	29:32	2:00
2nd	BU	Ron Anderson	Elbowing	37:18	2:00
2nd	MIN	Wally Olds	Interference	39:44	2:00
3rd	BU	Mike LaGarde	Holding	51:04	2:00
3rd	BU	Bob Murray	Hooking	58:09	2:00
3rd	MIN	Doug Peltier	Offensive Check	58:09	2:00
3rd	MIN	Dean Blais	Cross–Checking	59:49	2:00

Shots by period
Team	1	2	3	T
Minnesota	13	11	8	32
Boston University	12	11	9	32

Goaltenders
Team	Name	Saves	Goals against	Time on ice
MIN	Dennis Erickson	28	4	
BU	Dan Brady	30	2	
