= 1971 NCAA University Division men's ice hockey tournament =

College ice hockey tournament

- Teams: 4
- Finals site: Onondaga War Memorial, Syracuse, New York
- Champions: Boston University Terriers (1st title)
- Runner-up: Minnesota Golden Gophers (3rd title game)
- Semifinalists: Denver Pioneers (9th Frozen Four); Harvard Crimson (5th Frozen Four)
- Winning coach: Jack Kelly (1st title)
- MOP: Dan Brady (Boston University)
- Attendance: 17,830

The 1971 NCAA Men's University Division Ice Hockey Tournament was the culmination of the 1970–71 NCAA University Division men's ice hockey season, the 24th such tournament in NCAA history. It was held between March 18 and 20, 1971, and concluded with Boston University defeating Minnesota 4–2. All games were played at the Onondaga War Memorial in Syracuse, New York.

This was the first time that a team with a losing record participated in an NCAA tournament.

== Qualifying teams ==
Four teams qualified for the tournament, two each from the eastern and western regions. The ECAC tournament champion and the two WCHA tournament co-champions received automatic bids into the tournament. An at-large bid was offered to a second eastern team based upon both their ECAC tournament finish as well as their regular season record.

East							West						
Seed	School	Conference	Record	Berth type	Appearance	Last bid	Seed	School	Conference	Record	Berth type	Appearance	Last bid
1	Harvard	ECAC Hockey	18–6–1	Tournament champion	5th	1969	1	Denver	WCHA	24–9–1	Tournament co-champion	9th	1969
2	Boston University	ECAC Hockey	26–2–1	At-Large	7th	1967	2	Minnesota	WCHA	13–16–1	Tournament co-champion	4th	1961

== Format ==
The ECAC champion was seeded as the top eastern team while the WCHA co-champion with the better regular season record was given the top western seed. The second eastern seed was slotted to play the top western seed and vice versa. All games were played at the Onondaga War Memorial. All matches were Single-game eliminations with the semifinal winners advancing to the national championship game and the losers playing in a consolation game.

== Tournament Bracket ==
Semifinals; March 18–19
E1	Harvard	5
W2	Minnesota	6*
W1	Denver	2
E2	Boston University	4

National Championship; March 20
W2	Minnesota	2
E2	Boston University	4
Third Place Game
W1	Denver	1
E2	Harvard	0

Note: * denotes overtime period(s)

=== Semifinals ===
==== (W1) Denver vs. (E2) Boston University ====
March 18	Denver	2 – 4	Boston University	Onondaga War Memorial	Recap
(Christie, Venasky) Tom Peluso - 02:39		First period	08:08 - PP - Wayne Gowing (Brown); 11:41 - Toot Cahoon (LaGarde)
No scoring		Second period	14:22 - GW - Toot Cahoon (Stirling)
(Christie, Lampman) Brian Morenz - PP - 12:57		Third period	10:06 - PP - Toot Cahoon (Giandomenico, Stirling)
(40 saves / 44 shots) Ron Grahame		Goalie stats	Dan Brady (23 saves / 25 shots)

==== (E1) Harvard vs. (W2) Minnesota ====
March 19	Harvard	5 – 6	OT	Minnesota	Onondaga War Memorial	Recap
(unassisted) Dave Hynes - 10:56 (Reynolds, Riley) Tommy Paul - 11:15 (J. Cavanagh, Jones) Bob McManama - PP - 18:32		First period		19:02 - Dean Blais (Matschke, McIntosh)
(Hampe) Steve Owen - 07:07		Second period		10:15 - John Matschke (Sanders, Blais)
(Cavanagh) Steve Owen - 13:07		Third period		00:28 - Dean Blais (Antonovich, Matschke); 10:24 - Dean Blais (Matschke, McIntosh); 19:51 - John Matschke (Antonovich)
No scoring		First overtime period		01:45 - GW - Ron Peltier (D. Peltier, Sarner)
(44 saves / 50 shots) Bruce Durno		Goalie stats		Dennis Erickson (30 saves / 35 shots)

=== Consolation Game ===
==== (W1) Denver vs. (E1) Harvard ====
March 20	Denver	1 – 0	Harvard	Onondaga War Memorial	Recap
No scoring		First period	No scoring
(Christie, Peluso) Pete McNab - GW - 17:28		Second period	No scoring
No scoring		Third period	No scoring
(20 saves / 20 shots) Ron Grahame		Goalie stats	Bruce Durno (35 saves / 36 shots)

=== National Championship ===
==== (E2) Boston University vs. (W2) Minnesota ====
March 20	Boston University	4 – 2	Minnesota	Onondaga War Memorial

Scoring summary
Period	Team	Goal	Assist(s)	Time	Score
1st	BU	Steve Stirling - PP	Danby and Brown	5:32	1–0 BU
1st	BU	Bob Gryp	Gowing	10:10	2–0 BU
2nd	BU	Steve Stirling - GW	unassisted	29:13	3–0 BU
3rd	MIN	Doug Peltier	Sarner and McIntosh	53:07	3–1 BU
3rd	BU	Ron Anderson	Dolloff and Brown	57:45	4–1 BU
3rd	MIN	Dean Blais	McIntosh	59:44	4–2 BU
Penalty summary
Period	Team	Player	Penalty	Time	PIM
1st	MIN	Frank Sanders	Charging	5:01	2:00
1st	BU	Bob Murray	Holding	14:18	2:00
2nd	BU	Mike LaGarde	High-sticking	29:32	2:00
2nd	BU	Ron Anderson	Elbowing	37:18	2:00
2nd	MIN	Wally Olds	Interference	39:44	2:00
3rd	BU	Mike LaGarde	Holding	51:04	2:00
3rd	BU	Bob Murray	Hooking	58:09	2:00
3rd	MIN	Doug Peltier	Offensive check	58:09	2:00
3rd	MIN	Dean Blais	Cross-checking	59:49	2:00

Shots by period
Team	1	2	3	T
Minnesota	13	11	8	32
Boston University	12	11	9	32

Goaltenders
Team	Name	Saves	Goals against	Time on ice
MIN	Dennis Erickson	28	4	
BU	Dan Brady	30	2	

== All-Tournament Team ==
- G: Dan Brady* (Boston University)
- D: Bob Brown (Boston University)
- D: Bruce McIntosh (Minnesota)
- F: Dean Blais (Minnesota)
- F: Don Cahoon (Boston University)
- F: Steve Stirling (Boston University)

* Most Outstanding Player(s)
