= Bill Flynn (ice hockey) =

American ice hockey player (born 1951)

- Born: January 31, 1951 (age 75) Everett, Massachusetts, USA
- Height: 5 ft 10 in (178 cm)
- Weight: 176 lb (80 kg; 12 st 8 lb)
- Position: Wing
- Played for: EV Füssen
- NHL draft: Undrafted
- Playing career: 1972–1983

William Flynn is an American former ice hockey player. He won two national championships with Boston University before embarking on a professional career in various German leagues.

== Career ==
Flynn debuted as a varsity player on Boston University in the fall of 1970. While he was a depth player and only provided 3 assists in his first season, he had arrived just in time to be part of the Terriers' first national championship team. While he tripled his point total in year two, Flynn remained a role player for the team as it won the NCAA championship once more.

He left BU after the two titles and signed a professional contract with the Port Huron Wings. His scoring remained modest but he proved to be a solid defensive player, enabling him to continue his career the following year with the Dayton Gems. Flynn saw a significant jump in his offensive production with the Gems but he had few opportunities to move up in the North American leagues so he traveled across the Atlantic in 1974.

SG Nürnberg was Flynn's first stop and he immediately became a star play for the team. He averaged more than a goal per game and performed so well that he earned a contract with EV Füssen of the top German league. His stay there was brief as Flynn signed up to play with RSC Bremerhaven. He helped the club earn a promotion to the 2nd Bundesliga in 1978 and remained with the club until 1981. He spent his final two years between three teams before retiring as a player in 1983.

== Career statistics ==
=== Regular season and playoffs ===
			Regular Season					Playoffs
Season	Team	League	GP	G	A	Pts	PIM	GP	G	A	Pts	PIM
1970–71	Boston University	ECAC Hockey	18	0	3	3	4	—	—	—	—	—
1971–72	Boston University	ECAC Hockey	23	2	7	9	4	—	—	—	—	—
1972–73	Rhode Island Eagles	EHL	1	0	0	0	2	—	—	—	—	—
1972–73	Port Huron Wings	IHL	31	3	9	12	20	—	—	—	—	—
1973–74	Dayton Gems	IHL	60	16	22	38	65	—	—	—	—	—
1973–74	Flint Generals	IHL	—	—	—	—	—	7	1	0	1	2
1974–75	SG Nürnberg	Germany2	36	38	13	51	—	—	—	—	—	—
1975–76	statistics unknown
1976–77	EV Füssen	Germany	48	22	10	32	57	—	—	—	—	—
1977–78	RSC Bremerhaven	Germany3	statistics unknown
1978–79	RSC Bremerhaven	Germany2	statistics unknown
1979–80	RSC Bremerhaven	Germany2	statistics unknown
1980–81	RSC Bremerhaven	Germany2	4	5	2	7	4	—	—	—	—	—
1981–82	EC Hannover	Germany2	1	0	0	0	0	—	—	—	—	—
1981–82	Königsborner SV	Germany3	17	15	31	46	47	—	—	—	—	—
1982–83	EA Schongau	Germany3	1	1	2	3	0	—	—	—	—	—
