= 1971 WCHA men's ice hockey tournament =

1971 WCHA Men's ice hockey tournament
- Dates: March 11–13, 1971
- Teams: 8
- Finals site: Dane County Coliseum; Madison, Wisconsin; DU Arena; Denver, Colorado
- Champions: Minnesota† (2nd title); Denver‡ (8th title)
- Winning coach: Glen Sonmor (1st title); Murray Armstrong (8th title)
- WCHA Men's Ice Hockey Tournaments

The 1971 WCHA men's ice hockey tournament was the 12th conference playoff in league history. The tournament was played between March 12 and March 20, 1971. All East Regional games were played at the Dane County Coliseum in Madison, Wisconsin while West Regional games were held at the DU Arena in Denver, Colorado. By winning the regional tournaments, both the East Regional Champion†, Minnesota, and West Regional Champion‡, Denver, were invited to participate in the 1971 NCAA University Division men's ice hockey tournament.

== Format ==
The top eight teams in the WCHA, according to their final conference standings, were eligible for the tournament and were seeded No. 1 through No. 8. The eight teams were then divided into two separate groups by placing all even-numbered seeds in one group (2, 4, 6, 8) and the odd-numbered seeds (1, 3, 5, 7) in the other group. Using the location of the top seeds in each of the groups, the odd-numbered group (containing Michigan Tech) was placed in the east region which was held at the Dane County Coliseum while the odd-numbered grouping (containing Denver) was placed in the west region which was held at the DU Arena. Once each regional group was set the teams were reseeded No. 1 to No. 4 according to their final conference standings. In the first round the first and fourth seeds and the second and third seeds in each region were matched in a single game with the winners advancing to their regional final games. The winners of the two championship games were declared as co-conference tournament champions.

=== Conference standings ===
Note: GP = Games played; W = Wins; L = Losses; T = Ties; PCT = Winning percentage; GF = Goals for; GA = Goals against

1970–71 Western Collegiate Hockey Association standings
	Conference							Overall					
	GP	W	L	T	PCT	GF	GA	GP	W	L	T	GF	GA
Michigan Tech†	22	18	4	0	.818	112	62	33	25	6	2	173	105
Denver*	22	15	7	0	.682	114	92	36	25	10	1	178	133
Wisconsin	22	13	9	0	.591	102	77	34	20	13	1	180	110
Michigan State	22	12	10	0	.545	101	97	31	19	12	0	152	124
Minnesota*	22	9	12	1	.432	77	88	32	14	17	1	116	128
Minnesota-Duluth	24	10	14	0	.417	98	106	34	16	17	1	147	146
North Dakota	26	10	15	1	.404	92	116	33	14	17	2	123	141
Colorado College	18	7	11	0	.389	81	100	29	11	17	1	142	168
Michigan	22	5	17	0	.227	77	116	30	9	21	0	118	147
Championship: Minnesota, Denver † indicates conference regular season champion * indicates conference tournament champion

== Bracket ==
Regional semifinals March 11–12
E1	Michigan Tech	4
E4	North Dakota	6
East Regional
E2	Wisconsin	3
E3	Minnesota	4
W1	Denver	6
W4	Colorado College	3
West Regional
W2	Michigan State	3
W3	Minnesota-Duluth	4

Regional Finals; March 13
E4	North Dakota	2
E3	Minnesota	5
W1	Denver	9
W3	Minnesota-Duluth	3

Note: * denotes overtime period(s)

== East Regional ==
=== Semifinals ===
==== (1) Michigan Tech vs. (4) North Dakota ====
March 11	Michigan Tech	4 – 6	North Dakota	Dane County Coliseum

==== (2) Wisconsin vs. (3) Minnesota ====
March 11	Wisconsin	3 – 4	Minnesota	Dane County Coliseum

=== Finals ===
==== (3) Minnesota vs. (4) North Dakota ====
March 13	Minnesota	5 – 2	North Dakota	Dane County Coliseum

== West Regional ==
=== Semifinals ===
==== (1) Denver vs. (4) Colorado College ====
March 11	Denver	6 – 3	Colorado College	DU Arena

==== (2) Michigan State vs. (3) Minnesota-Duluth ====
March 12	Michigan State	3 – 4	Minnesota-Duluth	DU Arena

=== Finals ===
==== (1) Denver vs. (3) Minnesota-Duluth ====
March 13	Denver	9 – 3	Minnesota-Duluth	DU Arena

== Tournament awards ==
None

== See also ==
- Western Collegiate Hockey Association men's champions
