= 1971 ECAC Hockey men's ice hockey tournament =

1971 ECAC Men's ice hockey tournament
- Dates: March 9–13, 1971
- Teams: 8
- Finals site: Boston Garden; Boston, Massachusetts
- Champions: Harvard (2nd title)
- Winning coach: Cooney Weiland (2nd title)
- MVP: Dave Hynes (Harvard)
- ECAC Men's Ice Hockey Tournaments

The 1971 ECAC Hockey Men's Ice Hockey Tournament was the 10th tournament in league history. It was played in the Northeastern United States between March 9 and March 13, 1971. Quarterfinal games were played at home team campus sites, while the 'final four' games were played at the Boston Garden in Boston, Massachusetts. By reaching the championship game Harvard was invited to participate in the 1971 NCAA Division I Men's Ice Hockey Tournament. Clarkson, however, was passed over with Boston University chosen instead as the second eastern representative.

== Format ==
The tournament featured three rounds of play, all of which were single-elimination. The top eight teams, based on winning percentage, qualified to participate in the tournament. In the quarterfinals the first seed and eighth seed, the second seed and seventh seed, the third seed and sixth seed and the fourth seed and fifth seed played against one another. In the semifinals, the highest seed plays the lowest remaining seed while the two remaining teams play with the winners advancing to the championship game and the losers advancing to the third place game.

== Conference standings ==
Note: GP = Games played; W = Wins; L = Losses; T = Ties; Pct. = Winning percentage; GF = Goals for; GA = Goals against

1970–71 ECAC Hockey standings
	Conference							Overall					
	GP	W	L	T	Pct.	GF	GA	GP	W	L	T	GF	GA
Boston University†	20	18	1	1	.925	139	42	31	28	2	1	210	60
Clarkson	19	16	2	1	.868	76	38	33	28	4	1	151	75
Cornell	20	17	3	0	.850	111	44	27	22	5	0	159	63
Harvard*	21	15	5	1	.738	124	55	27	18	8	1	146	74
Brown	19	13	6	0	.684	70	63	24	13	10	0	77	87
Providence	19	12	7	0	.632	94	70	28	17	11	0	141	106
Pennsylvania	19	11	8	0	.579	90	74	25	14	11	0	129	93
Rensselaer	14	7	5	2	.571	119	81	25	16	7	2	125	95
New Hampshire	20	11	9	0	.550	119	92	29	20	9	0	210	112
Boston College	21	9	12	0	.429	92	112	26	11	15	0	121	141
Army	11	3	7	1	.318	32	48	23	8	14	1	81	80
St. Lawrence	17	5	12	0	.294	57	73	24	10	14	0	105	97
Dartmouth	21	6	15	0	.286	76	106	24	9	15	0	96	114
Yale	20	5	15	0	.250	64	105	24	6	17	1	74	127
Colgate	17	4	13	0	.235	54	111	24	7	17	0	87	156
Northeastern	19	3	16	0	.158	35	122	29	7	22	0	77	175
Princeton	21	1	20	0	.048	54	140	23	1	22	0	56	155
Championship: Harvard † indicates conference regular season champion * indicates conference tournament champion

== Bracket ==
Teams are reseeded after the first round

Quarterfinals; March 9
1	Boston University	11
8	Rensselaer	0
2	Clarkson	5
7	Pennsylvania	2
3	Cornell	6
6	Providence	3
4	Harvard	4
5	Brown	3

Semifinals; March 12
1	Boston University	2
4	Harvard	4
2	Clarkson	4
3	Cornell	1

Championship; March 13
2	Clarkson	4
4	Harvard	7
Third Place
1	Boston University	6
3	Cornell	5

Note: * denotes overtime period(s)

=== Quarterfinals ===
==== (1) Boston University vs. (8) Rensselaer ====
March 9	Boston University	11 – 0	Rensselaer	Boston Arena

==== (2) Clarkson vs. (7) Pennsylvania ====
March 9	Clarkson	5 – 2	Pennsylvania	Clarkson Arena

==== (3) Cornell vs. (6) Providence ====
March 9	Cornell	6 – 3	Providence	Lynah Rink

==== (4) Harvard vs. (5) Brown ====
March 9	Harvard	4 – 3	Brown	Donald C. Watson Rink

=== Semifinals ===
==== (1) Boston University vs. (4) Harvard ====
March 12	Boston University	2 – 4	Harvard	Boston Garden

==== (2) Clarkson vs. (3) Cornell ====
March 12	Clarkson	7 – 4	Cornell	Boston Garden

=== Third Place ===
==== (1) Boston University vs. (3) Cornell ====
March 13	Boston University	6 – 5	Cornell	Boston Garden

=== Championship ===
==== (2) Clarkson vs. (4) Harvard ====
March 13	Clarkson	4 – 7	Harvard	Boston Garden

== Tournament awards ==
=== All-Tournament Team ===
==== First Team ====
- F Dave Hynes* (Harvard)
- F John Halme (Clarkson)
- F Joe Cavanagh (Harvard)
- D Jim Higgs (Cornell)
- D Steve Warr (Clarkson)
- G Bruce Bullock (Clarkson)

* Most Outstanding Player(s)

==== Second Team ====
- F Steve Stirling (Boston University)
- F Jerry Kemp (Clarkson)
- F Larry Fullan (Cornell)
- D Bob Brown (Boston University)
- D Ric Jordan (Boston University)
- G Bruce Durno (Harvard)
