= Mike Christie (ice hockey) =

American ice hockey player (1949–2019)

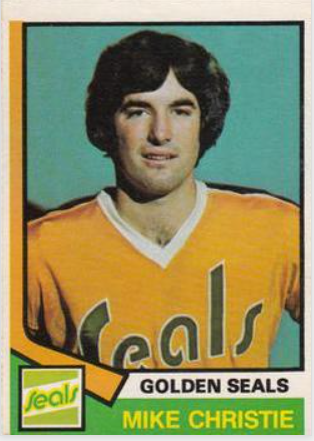
- Born: December 20, 1949 Big Spring, Texas, U.S.
- Died: July 11, 2019 (aged 69) Denver, Colorado, U.S.
- Height: 6 ft 0 in (183 cm)
- Weight: 190 lb (86 kg; 13 st 8 lb)
- Position: Defense
- Shot: Left
- Played for: Vancouver Canucks; Colorado Rockies; Cleveland Barons; California Seals
- National team: United States
- NHL draft: Undrafted
- Playing career: 1974–1981

Michael Hunt Christie (December 20, 1949 – July 11, 2019) was a professional ice hockey defenseman who played 412 games in the National Hockey League for the California Seals, Cleveland Barons, Colorado Rockies, and Vancouver Canucks from 1974 to 1981.

== Biography ==
Born in Big Spring, Texas, and raised in Calgary, Alberta, Christie was the first native Texan to play in the NHL, although it was strictly a technicality as his father was a Canadian citizen working for an American oil company and Mike grew up in Canada.

Before turning professional, Christie played for the University of Denver men's ice hockey team, becoming a first team all-American in 1971 as well as being chosen for the US amateur national team at the 1972 Ice Hockey World Championship Pool B tournament. Undrafted, Christie was signed by the Chicago Black Hawks and played two minor league seasons with the Dallas Black Hawks (CHL), before being traded to the California Golden Seals in 1974. He made his NHL debut there at the start of the 1974-75 season and played until the franchise moved to Cleveland in 1977, becoming the Cleveland Barons. Christie was captain of the NHL's Colorado Rockies hockey team in the late 1970s, and his NHL career ended with the Vancouver Canucks in 1981.

Christie also represented the United States in the inaugural 1976 Canada Cup tournament.

Christie settled in Colorado after his hockey career ended, and started a second career as a sales representative that allowed him to enjoy his other athletic passion - golf. He represented several well-known brands, including Callaway and Top-Flite, before retiring in 2010.

Christie died of kidney disease in July 2019. He was married to his wife of 47 years, Molly (née Hamill), and had two daughters, Lisa and Colleen, a son Dan, and four grandchildren.

== Awards and honors ==
Award	Year
All-WCHA First Team	1970–71
AHCA West All-American	1970–71

== Career statistics ==
=== Regular season and playoffs ===
			Regular season					Playoffs
Season	Team	League	GP	G	A	Pts	PIM	GP	G	A	Pts	PIM
1968–69	University of Denver	WCHA	—	—	—	—	—	—	—	—	—	—
1969–70	University of Denver	WCHA	31	2	16	18	38	—	—	—	—	—
1970–71	University of Denver	WCHA	36	8	25	33	57	—	—	—	—	—
1971–72	University of Denver	WCHA	—	—	—	—	—	—	—	—	—	—
1972–73	Dallas Black Hawks	CHL	32	5	11	16	51	—	—	—	—	—
1973–74	Dallas Black Hawks	CHL	71	5	37	42	110	10	1	2	3	23
1974–75	California Golden Seals	NHL	34	0	14	14	76	—	—	—	—	—
1975–76	California Golden Seals	NHL	78	3	18	21	152	—	—	—	—	—
1976–77	Cleveland Barons	NHL	79	6	27	33	79	—	—	—	—	—
1977–78	Cleveland Barons	NHL	34	1	6	7	49	—	—	—	—	—
1977–78	Colorado Rockies	NHL	35	2	8	10	28	2	0	0	0	0
1978–79	Colorado Rockies	NHL	68	1	10	11	88	—	—	—	—	—
1979–80	Colorado Rockies	NHL	74	1	17	18	78	—	—	—	—	—
1980–81	Colorado Rockies	NHL	1	0	0	0	0	—	—	—	—	—
1980–81	Tulsa Oilers	CHL	20	1	0	1	27	—	—	—	—	—
1980–81	Vancouver Canucks	NHL	9	1	1	2	0	—	—	—	—	—
1980–81	Dallas Black Hawks	CHL	40	2	20	22	95	6	0	3	3	10
CHL totals			163	13	68	81	283	16	1	5	6	33
NHL totals			412	15	101	116	550	2	0	0	0	0

=== International ===
Year	Team	Event	GP	G	A	Pts	PIM
1976	United States	CC	4	0	0	0	2

Sporting positions
Preceded by Gary Croteau	Colorado Rockies captain 1980	Succeeded by René Robert
