= Tom Mellor (ice hockey) =

American ice hockey player (born 1950)

- Born: January 27, 1950 (age 76) Cranston, Rhode Island, U.S.
- Height: 6 ft 0 in (183 cm)
- Weight: 185 lb (84 kg; 13 st 3 lb)
- Position: Defense
- Shot: Right
- Played for: Detroit Red Wings; London Lions; Västra Frölunda IF
- National team: United States
- NHL draft: 68th overall, 1970; Detroit Red Wings
- Playing career: 1973–1977
Medal record
Men's ice hockey
Representing United States
Olympic Games
Silver medal – second place	1972 Sapporo	Team

Thomas Robert Mellor (born January 27, 1950) is an American former professional ice hockey defenseman. He played 26 games in the National Hockey League with the Detroit Red Wings during the 1973–74 and 1974–75 seasons. Internationally, Mellor played for the American national team at the 1972 Winter Olympics, winning a silver medal.

== Playing career ==
Before being drafted by the Detroit Red Wings, Mellor played hockey for Boston College. In the 1968–69 season, he scored nine goals and 19 points in his 17-game rookie season. In his sophomore season, he scored 21 goals and 44 points in 26 games. He scored a hat trick for Boston College in a 13–6 win over Rensselaer Polytechnic Institute. In his junior year in the NCAA he had 40 points in 25 games for the Boston Eagles. During his years at Boston College, he led Boston College in assists on two occasions (1971: 30; 1973: 45) and was ranked third for most assists in a season at Boston College. He was also a two-time recipient (1971, 1973) of Boston College's Norman F. Dailey Memorial Award as the team's Most Valuable Player. He was inducted into the Boston College Varsity Club Athletic Hall of Fame in 1980.

Mellor was drafted 68th overall by the Detroit Red Wings in 1970 NHL Amateur Draft and played 26 regular-season games in the National Hockey League for Detroit between 1973 and 1975. Mellor also played in the American Hockey League for the Virginia Wings; in the International Hockey League for the Toledo Goaldiggers; and in the Swedish Elitserien with Västra Frölunda. As a player in the IHL, he was named to the First-Team All-Star Team, he won the James Gatschene Memorial Trophy and the Governor's Trophy in 1977, his last season as a professional player before retiring.

As an amateur, Mellor represented the United States national team at the 1972 Winter Olympics in Sapporo, winning a silver medal. Mellor also played in the 1971, 1972 and 1973 Ice Hockey World Championship tournaments.

Mellor was formally inducted into the Rhode Island Hockey Hall of Fame in 2022. At the same enshrinement ceremony, his 101-year-old father, Don Mellor, a pioneer youth hockey organizer, was honored by the Hall with the Malcolm Greene Chace Memorial Trophy for "Lifetime Achievement of a Rhode Islander to the game of hockey."

== Career statistics ==
=== Regular season and playoffs ===
			Regular season					Playoffs
Season	Team	League	GP	G	A	Pts	PIM	GP	G	A	Pts	PIM
1966–67	Northwood School	HS-NY	—	—	—	—	—	—	—	—	—	—
1967–68	Northwood School	HS-NY	—	—	—	—	—	—	—	—	—	—
1968–69	Boston College	ECAC	—	—	—	—	—	—	—	—	—	—
1969–70	Boston College	ECAC	26	21	23	44	40	—	—	—	—	—
1970–71	Boston College	ECAC	25	10	30	40	43	—	—	—	—	—
1970–71	United States National Team	Intl	18	1	4	5	8	—	—	—	—	—
1971–72	United States National Team	Intl	7	4	8	12	6	—	—	—	—	—
1972–73	Boston College	ECAC	30	6	45	51	50	—	—	—	—	—
1973–74	Detroit Red Wings	NHL	25	2	4	6	25	—	—	—	—	—
1973–74	Virginia Wings	AHL	23	5	18	23	40	—	—	—	—	—
1973–74	London Lions	Intl	6	2	5	7	20	—	—	—	—	—
1974–75	Detroit Red Wings	NHL	1	0	0	0	0	—	—	—	—	—
1974–75	Virginia Wings	AHL	73	17	35	52	147	5	0	2	2	17
1975–76	Västra Frölunda IF	SWE	34	8	8	16	41	—	—	—	—	—
1975–76	Toledo Goaldiggers	IHL	13	3	12	15	19	4	0	2	2	7
1976–77	Toledo Goaldiggers	IHL	75	13	61	74	118	19	4	17	21	16
NHL totals			26	2	4	6	25	—	—	—	—	—

=== International ===
Year	Team	Event	GP	G	A	Pts	PIM
1971	United States	WC	10	1	3	4	2
1972	United States	OLY	6	0	0	0	4
1973	United States	WC-B	10	1	3	4	2
Senior totals			26	2	6	8	8

== Awards and honors ==
Award	Year	Ref
All-ECAC Hockey Second Team	1969–70; 1970–71	
All-ECAC Hockey First Team	1972–73	
AHCA East All-American	1972–73	

Awards and achievements
Preceded by Joe Cavanagh	ECAC Hockey Rookie of the Year; 1969–70	Succeeded by Bob Brown
Preceded by Bob Brown	ECAC Hockey Player of the Year; 1972–73	Succeeded by Randy Roth
