= Brick Chapel Church and Cemetery =

Historic site in St. Lawrence County, New York

- U.S. National Register of Historic Places
- Location within New York Location within the United States
- Nearest city: Canton, New York
- Coordinates: 44°33′36″N 75°6′58″W
- Area: 6.8 acres (2.8 ha)
- Built: 1858
- Architectural style: Mid 19th Century Revival, Late 19th And 20th Century Revivals
- NRHP reference No.: 05001461
- Added to NRHP: December 22, 2005

Brick Chapel Church and Cemetery is a historic Presbyterian church and cemetery located at Canton in St. Lawrence County, New York. The church was built in 1858 for the local Methodist congregation, who merged with the Presbyterians in the 1910s. It is a 40 feet by 56 feet brick structure resting on a raised ashlar limestone foundation. It features a large, square engaged bell tower on the front facade. Also on the property is a cemetery with burials dating to 1809.

It was listed on the National Register of Historic Places in 2005.
