= Bruce Bullock =

Canadian ice hockey player

- Born: May 9, 1949 (age 75); Toronto, Ontario, Canada
- Height: 5 ft 7 in (170 cm)
- Weight: 160 lb (73 kg; 11 st 6 lb)
- Position: Goaltender
- Caught: Right
- Played for: Vancouver Canucks
- NHL draft: Undrafted
- Playing career: 1972–1977

Bruce John Bullock (born May 9, 1949) is a Canadian former professional ice hockey goaltender who spent parts of three seasons in the National Hockey League in the 1970s with the Vancouver Canucks.

Playing for Clarkson University, Bullock was one of the most decorated college goaltenders of his era. He was named to the NCAA First Team All-American in goal in both 1970 and 1971 (succeeding Hall of Famer Ken Dryden, who took the honor from 1967–69), and was named ECAC Player of the Year in 1971. He also led Clarkson to the 1970 NCAA title game, where they lost to Cornell.

Following his college career, Bullock was signed by the Vancouver Canucks during training camp, and assigned to their farm team, the Rochester Americans. He was then loaned to the Chicago Black Hawks' farm team in Dallas. When a position became available at the Canucks' other farm team, the Seattle Totems, he was assigned there where he completed his rookie pro season. He caught a break in 1972–73 when an injury to Canuck starter Dunc Wilson forced his recall from the minors. He appeared in 13 games for Vancouver, posting a 3–8–3 record with a 4.79 GAA, until his season ended due to a broken finger, requiring surgery.

Bullock spent another four seasons in Vancouver's organization, but never saw substantial NHL action, partially due to hand injuries. He made one start for the club in the 1974–75 campaign, and another appearance in 1976–77. During his minor league career, he helped the Seattle Totems upset the USSR national team in an exhibition game and was instrumental in helping the Tulsa Oilers win the Adams Cup in 1975–76. He was ultimately released by Vancouver in 1977 to make room in the system for high draft picks Glen Hanlon and Murray Bannerman, and played two more seasons with the Phoenix Roadrunners in the Pacific Hockey League before retiring in 1979.

In 16 NHL appearances, Bullock posted a 3–9–3 record with a 4.79 GAA.

== Career statistics ==
=== Regular season and playoffs ===
			Regular season									Playoffs
Season	Team	League	GP	W	L	T	MIN	GA	SO	GAA	SV%	GP	W	L	MIN	GA	SO	GAA	SV%
1968–69	Clarkson University	ECAC	28	19	7	2	1676	96	3	3.44	—	—	—	—	—	—	—	—	—
1969–70	Clarkson University	ECAC	27	25	2	0	1550	79	4	3.06	—	—	—	—	—	—	—	—	—
1970–71	Clarkson University	ECAC	30	28	1	1	1800	71	1	2.37	—	—	—	—	—	—	—	—	—
1971–72	Dallas Black Hawks	CHL	5	0	2	1	220	15	0	3.75	—	—	—	—	—	—	—	—	—
1971–72	Seattle Totems	WHL	10	3	7	0	564	43	0	4.57	—	—	—	—	—	—	—	—	—
1972–73	Vancouver Canucks	NHL	14	3	8	3	840	67	0	4.79	.857	—	—	—	—	—	—	—	—
1972–73	Seattle Totems	WHL	13	7	6	0	750	45	0	3.60	—	—	—	—	—	—	—	—	—
1973–74	Seattle Totems	WHL	46	22	20	3	2703	165	2	3.66	—	—	—	—	—	—	—	—	—
1974–75	Vancouver Canucks	NHL	1	0	1	0	60	4	0	4.00	.840	—	—	—	—	—	—	—	—
1974–75	Seattle Totems	CHL	48	14	20	7	2580	168	1	3.91	—	—	—	—	—	—	—	—	—
1975–76	Beauce Jaros	NAHL	19	—	—	—	1067	60	2	3.37	—	—	—	—	—	—	—	—	—
1975–76	Tulsa Oilers	CHL	17	13	3	0	958	39	1	2.44	—	6	6	0	360	10	1	1.67	—
1976–77	Vancouver Canucks	NHL	1	0	0	0	27	3	0	6.77	—	—	—	—	—	—	—	—	—
1976–77	Tulsa Oilers	CHL	40	20	14	6	2347	135	1	3.45	—	8	4	4	480	21	0	2.63	—
1977–78	Phoenix Roadrunners	PHL	31	—	—	—	1747	104	1	3.57	—	—	—	—	—	—	—	—	—
1978–79	Phoenix Roadrunners	PHL	31	—	—	—	1872	100	1	3.21	—	—	—	—	—	—	—	—	—
NHL totals			16	3	9	3	927	74	0	4.79	.854	—	—	—	—	—	—	—	—

== Awards and honors ==
Award	Year
AHCA East All-American	1969–70
ECAC Hockey All-Tournament First Team	1970
All-NCAA All-Tournament Team	1970
All-ECAC Hockey First Team	1970–71
AHCA East All-American	1970–71
ECAC Hockey All-Tournament First Team	1971

Awards and achievements
Preceded by Ken Dryden	ECAC Hockey Most Outstanding Player in Tournament; 1970	Succeeded by Dave Hynes
Preceded by Tim Sheehy	ECAC Hockey Player of the Year; 1970–71	Succeeded by Bob Brown
