= Joe Cavanagh =

American attorney and ice hockey player

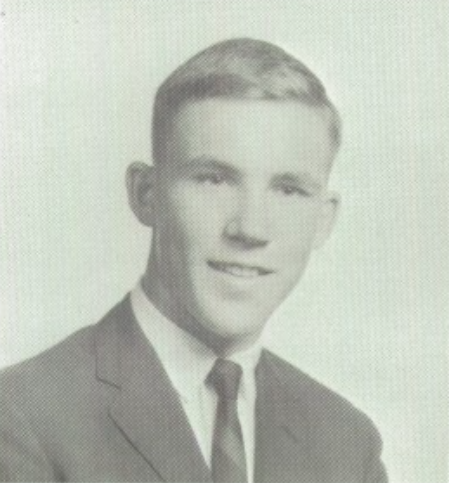
- Born: April 13, 1948 (age 78) Providence, Rhode Island, U.S.
- Height: 5 ft 10 in (178 cm)
- Weight: 174 lb (79 kg; 12 st 6 lb)
- Position: Forward
- Played for: Harvard University; Braintree Hawks
- Playing career: 1968–1972

Joseph Vincent Cavanagh Jr. (born April 13, 1948) is an American attorney and former ice hockey player. Cavanagh was a three-time all-state selection as a high schooler in Rhode Island. He went on to play hockey at Harvard University where he earned multiple awards including being named an All-American for three straight years. He left Harvard as the school's all-time assist leader which has since been passed. However, he remains the Beanpot's all-time leading scorer. An injury led him to stop pursuing a career in hockey. He was inducted into the United States Hockey Hall of Fame in 1994 and named one of the top 50 players in ECAC history in 2010. Following his hockey career Cavanagh began practicing law becoming a successful attorney. He is a member of the Rhode Island Bar Association and the Board of Bar Examiners.

== Early life ==
Cavanagh grew up as part of a large family having eight siblings in the city of Cranston, Rhode Island. As a high school student Cavanagh was a three-time all-state selection who was renowned for his on ice work ethic. He led the state in scoring for three years from 1964 to 1966 and was named Rhode Island's most valuable high school player in 1965 and 1966. He spent one year in a post-graduate program at Phillips Academy in Massachusetts. He graduated from Harvard College with a Bachelor of Arts degree in 1971.

== Playing career ==
Following his post-graduate year he began playing at Harvard University. In his first season, he helped Harvard win the Beanpot tournament earning MVP honors. By the end of the season, he compiled a team leading 24 goals and 62 points. He earned multiple post season honors for his play including: first team All-American, first team All-East, first team All-Ivy, first team All-New England, Eastern Collegiate Athletic Conference (ECAC) Hockey Rookie of the Year and the Walter Brown Award (given to best American-born player). The following season after he tied a teammate as the team's leading scorer, he was again named first team All-American, All-East, All-Ivy and All-New England. In addition he was also awarded the John Tudor Memorial Cup Award as Harvard's most valuable player. In his senior year Cavanagh registered 72 points and led the team in scoring for the third consecutive year. He duplicated the awards he earned during his junior year and added the Bingham Award as the top male athlete at Harvard and the Walter Brown Award as the top U.S.-born player in New England. He finished his career at Harvard as the team's all-time leader in assists (127), second all-time in points (187) and third all-time in goals (60). His assist total now ranks third all-time. While he remains fifth in points, he has fallen to fourteenth in goals. He is the Beanpot tournament's all-time leading scorer. He was named to the ECAC's All Decade first team.

Following his collegiate career, Cavanagh played one season with the Braintree Hawks in the New England Hockey League (NEnHL) scoring 13 goals and registering 39 points. In 1971 he took a deferment from law school in an attempt to make the 1972 Olympic hockey team and was invited to Boston Bruins training camp. Cavanagh broke his wrist during a practice with the Olympic team and decided not to pursue a career in hockey. In 1994 he was elected to the United States Hockey Hall of Fame. Sixteen years later he was announced as one of the top 50 players in ECAC history.

== Attorney ==
After his playing career Cavanagh earned a J.D. degree from Boston College Law School. He has earned multiple honors as an attorney. From 2005 to 2010 he was recognized as an outstanding general litigator by Chambers USA. He was named a Rhode Island and New England Super Lawyer from 2007 to 2010. He has served on the Rhode Island Board of Bar Examiners and is a member of the Rhode Island Bar Association as well as serving on its Superior Court Bench/Bar Committee. Cavanagh has served as Chairman of the Rhode Island chapter of the American College of Trial Lawyers which he has been a member of since 1990.

== Personal life ==
Cavanagh along with his wife, Carol, live in Warwick, Rhode Island. The couple had nine children together. In 1982 he coached youth hockey and later served on the board of directors for the Warwick Junior Hockey Association. He is a founding director of ACCESS/R.I., an organization dedicated to improving public access to government information. He serves as a director and vice president of the St. Thomas More Law Society and is an officer and director of the Rhode Island Special Olympics. His son, former San Jose Sharks player, Tom died on January 6, 2011, at the age of 28. His death was believed to be a suicide. Tom had battled mental illness for some time.

== Awards and honors ==
Award	Year
All-ECAC Hockey First Team	1968–69
AHCA East All-American	1968–69
ECAC Hockey All-Tournament First Team	1969
All-ECAC Hockey Second Team	1969–70
AHCA East All-American	1969–70
ECAC Hockey All-Tournament First Team	1970
All-ECAC Hockey First Team	1970–71
AHCA East All-American	1970–71
ECAC Hockey All-Tournament First Team	1971

Awards and achievements
Preceded by Mike Hyndman	ECAC Hockey Rookie of the Year; 1968–69	Succeeded by Tom Mellor
