= Wayne L. Nicholson =

American microbiologist

- Born: Wayne Lowell Nicholson; March 26, 1958; Canton, New York, U.S.
- Died: June 8, 2023 (aged 65)
- Education: University of Wisconsin–Madison
- Occupation: Microbiologist

Wayne Lowell Nicholson (March 26, 1958 – June 8, 2023) was an American microbiologist.

== Life and career ==
Nicholson was born in Canton, New York, the son of Lowell and Ethel Nicholson. He attended the University of Wisconsin–Madison, earning his PhD degree in 1987. After earning his degree, he worked as a postdoctoral fellow at the University of Connecticut from 1988 to 1991.

Nicholson served as a professor in the department of microbiology and cell biology at the University of Florida from 2003 to 2023. During his years as a professor, in 2019, he was named a distinguished professor, and was named a fellow of the American Association for the Advancement of Science.

== Death ==
Nicholson died on June 8, 2023, at the age of 65.
