= Wayne Gowing =

Canadian ice hockey player

Biographical details
- Born: 1947 (age 78–79); Kitchener, Ontario, Canada
- Education: Boston University

Playing career
- 1968–1971: Boston University
- Position: Wing

Coaching career (HC unless noted)
- 1973–1997: Wilfrid Laurier

Head coaching record
- Overall: 309–169–50 (.633)

Accomplishments and honors

Championships
- 1977 OUAA West Division Champion; 1978 OUAA West Division Champion; 1983 OUAA Tournament Champion; 1986 OUAA Champion; 1989 OUAA Tournament Champion; 1990 OUAA Central Division Champion; 1990 OUAA Tournament Champion

Awards
- 1983 OUAA Coach of the Year; 1994 OUAA Coach of the Year; 1994 CIS Coach of the Year

Wayne Gowing is a Canadian former ice hockey player and coach. He won a national championship with Boston University before embarking on a long tenure as the head coach for Wilfrid Laurier, before resigning in 1997. Gowing was added to the Wilfrid Laurier hall of fame in 2021.

== Career ==
After playing junior hockey in his home town of Kitchener, Gowing began attending Boston University in the fall of 1967. Because NCAA rules prevented freshmen from playing at the time, Gowing spent his first year with the Terriers on their freshman team. He debuted on the varsity squad a year later steadily increased his scoring output each year. As a senior, Gowing nearly doubled his career point total and helped BU win the first national championship in program history. His final point as a player was the primary assist on Bob Gryp's goal to give the Terriers a 2–0 lead.

After graduating, Gowing returned to Canada and began coaching. He was named as the head coach for Wilfrid Laurier in 1973, taking over in the program's third season. After an unremarkable first three seasons with the Golden hawks, Gowing began to make an impact on the program in year four. The Hawks won their first division title as well as their first playoff game in 1977. The following year, the team reached the conference championship game for the first time, ultimately losing to Toronto.

The team regressed after the championship appearance, missing the postseason in three consecutive seasons, but made a stunning comeback in 1983. While setting a new program record for wins, the Golden Hawks charged all the way to the finals and this time defeated Toronto to win their first conference title. Over the succeeding five seasons, Gowing kept Wilfrid Laurier as one of the top teams in the conference. The Hawks hit the 20-win mark for the first time in 1986, losing in the championship round that season.

By the late 80's, the team's records were beginning to decline but Laurier remained in the playoff picture. Despite finishing 4th in their division, the 1989 Hawks went on a long playoff run that saw the team win not only its conference championship but march all the way to the national championship. After losing the final, the team returned the following year with a renewed purpose. Wilfrid Laurier won both its division and conference tournament and made it back to the national championship game. Unfortunately, the result was the same and the Hawks had to settle for being runners-up.

Laurier continued to perform well in the early 90's but was unable to get another title. Gowing had the team in prime position in 1994, reaching 20 wins for the second time, however, the Golden Hawks were upset in the Divisional Final by Western in triple overtime. Despite the finish, Gowing was named as the national coach of the year.

1995 saw the team take a sharp downturn and finish with terrible records for two seasons. After 24 years behind the bench, Gowing decided to call it a career and resigned as coach in 1997. After his departure, the team honored Gowing's contributions by renaming the team's MVP award the 'Wayne Gowing Award'. Gowing was inducted into the university's athletic hall of fame in 2021.

== Career statistics ==
=== Regular season and playoffs ===
			Regular Season					Playoffs
Season	Team	League	GP	G	A	Pts	PIM	GP	G	A	Pts	PIM
1966–67	Kitchener Rangers	OHA	48	14	14	28	9	—	—	—	—	—
1967–68	Boston University	ECAC Hockey	DNP - Freshman
1968–69	Boston University	ECAC Hockey	29	5	11	16	8	—	—	—	—	—
1969–70	Boston University	ECAC Hockey	26	10	18	28	6	—	—	—	—	—
1970–71	Boston University	ECAC Hockey	31	16	24	40	6	—	—	—	—	—
NCAA Totals			86	31	53	84	20	—	—	—	—	—

== Head coaching record ==
Record table
Season	Team	Overall	Conference	Standing	Postseason
Wilfrid Laurier Golden Hawks (OUAA) (1973–1997)
1973–74	Wilfrid Laurier	8–9–1		4th (west)	Provincial Quarterfinal
1974–75	Wilfrid Laurier	11–5–1		3rd (west)	Provincial Quarterfinal
1975–76	Wilfrid Laurier	4–10–2		4th (west)	
1976–77	Wilfrid Laurier	13–6–1		1st (west)	Provincial Semifinal
1977–78	Wilfrid Laurier	17–2–1		1st (west)	Provincial Runner-Up
1978–79	Wilfrid Laurier	9–5–2		2nd (west)	Provincial Quarterfinal
1979–80	Wilfrid Laurier	5–14–3		9th	
1980–81	Wilfrid Laurier	12–8–2		7th	
1981–82	Wilfrid Laurier	12–7–3		5th	
1982–83	Wilfrid Laurier	19–4–1		3rd	National Tournament
1983–84	Wilfrid Laurier	15–3–6		2nd	Provincial Semifinal
1984–85	Wilfrid Laurier	18–2–4		2nd	Provincial Quarterfinal
1985–86	Wilfrid Laurier	20–3–1		1st	National Tournament
1986–87	Wilfrid Laurier	14–6–4		5th	Provincial Semifinal
1987–88	Wilfrid Laurier	13–9–4		4th (central)	Provincial Quarterfinal
1988–89	Wilfrid Laurier	13–10–3		4th (central)	National Runner-Up
1989–90	Wilfrid Laurier	19–3–0		1st (central)	National Runner-Up
1990–91	Wilfrid Laurier	13–8–1		3rd (west)	Divisional Semifinal
1991–92	Wilfrid Laurier	13–7–2		4th (west)	National Tournament
1992–93	Wilfrid Laurier	16–5–1		2nd (west)	Divisional Semifinal
1993–94	Wilfrid Laurier	20–3–1		2nd (far west)	Divisional Final
1994–95	Wilfrid Laurier	14–8–2		2nd (far west)	Divisional Semifinal
1995–96	Wilfrid Laurier	5–20–1		4th (far west)	
1996–97	Wilfrid Laurier	6–17–3		4th (far west)	
Wilfrid Laurier:		309–169–50			
Total:		309–169–50			
National champion Postseason invitational champion Conference regular season champion Conference regular season and conference tournament champion Division regular season champion Division regular season and conference tournament champion Conference tournament champion
