= North Country Thanksgiving Festival =

- Sport: College ice hockey
- Founded: 1970
- Folded: 1981
- No. of teams: 4–3
- Venues: Appleton Arena, Walker Arena
- Last champion: Clarkson
- Most titles: Clarkson (8)

The North Country Thanksgiving Festival (also called the 'North Country Thanksgiving Invitational') was an annual NCAA men's Division I ice hockey tournament held annually at the Appleton Arena and Walker Arena in upstate New York around Thanksgiving. The tournament began in 1970 and was played every year until 1981. Both Clarkson and St. Lawrence served as hosts for the in-season tournament.

== Format ==
Unlike most college hockey tournaments, the North Country Festival did not have a championship game. Instead, each of the four participants would play one another and the team(s) with the best record would be awarded the championship. The series changed to a more normal bracket format in 1974 but returned to the round-robin arrangement the following year. In 1978 and 1981, only three teams participated in the tournament. In 1979 and 1980 the two 'visiting' teams did not play one another.

== Yearly results ==
Year	Champion	Runner-up	Third place	Fourth place
1970	Clarkson	New Hampshire	Bowling Green	St. Lawrence
1971	St. Lawrence	Clarkson	Vermont	Colgate
1972	Clarkson	Vermont	Rensselaer	St. Lawrence
1973	Toronto	Clarkson	Ohio State	St. Lawrence
1974	Bowling Green	Boston University	Clarkson	St. Lawrence
1975	Concordia	Clarkson	St. Lawrence	Vermont
1976	Clarkson	Ottawa	New Hampshire	St. Lawrence
1977	Clarkson	Rensselaer	St. Lawrence	Concordia
1978	Clarkson	St. Lawrence	Laval	N/A
1979	Clarkson	Western Ontario / Yale		St. Lawrence
1980	Clarkson	Lowell	Bowling Green	St. Lawrence
1981	Clarkson	St. Lawrence	Brown	N/A

== Team records ==
Team	# of times participated	Titles
Clarkson	12	8
Toronto	1	1
Concordia	2	1
Bowling Green	3	1
St. Lawrence	12	1
Boston University	1	0
Brown	1	0
Colgate	1	0
Laval	1	0
Lowell	1	0
Ohio State	1	0
Ottawa	1	0
Western Ontario	1	0
Yale	1	0
New Hampshire	2	0
Rensselaer	2	0
Vermont	3	0

== Game results ==
=== 1970 ===
Date	Location	Winning Team	Score	Losing Team	Score
26 November	Appleton Arena	Clarkson	3	New Hampshire	2
26 November	Appleton Arena	Bowling Green	6	St. Lawrence	5
27 November	Clarkson Arena	Clarkson	5	Bowling Green	2
27 November	Clarkson Arena	New Hampshire	4	St. Lawrence	2
28 November	Appleton Arena	Clarkson	4	St. Lawrence	2
28 November	Appleton Arena	New Hampshire	6	Bowling Green	4

=== 1971 ===
Date	Location	Winning Team	Score	Losing Team	Score
25 November	Appleton Arena	Clarkson	9	Colgate	3
25 November	Appleton Arena	St. Lawrence	7	Vermont	6
26 November	Appleton Arena	Clarkson	6	Vermont	2
26 November	Clarkson Arena	Colgate	3	St. Lawrence	2
27 November	Appleton Arena	St. Lawrence	3	Clarkson	2
27 November	Clarkson Arena	Vermont	9	Colgate	3

=== 1972 ===
Date	Location	Winning Team	Score	Losing Team	Score
23 November	Clarkson Arena	Clarkson	5	Vermont	2
23 November	Appleton Arena	Rensselaer	4	St. Lawrence	2
24 November	Clarkson Arena	Clarkson	4	Rensselaer	2
24 November	Appleton Arena	Vermont	4	St. Lawrence	1
25 November	Appleton Arena	St. Lawrence	6	Clarkson	2
25 November	Clarkson Arena	Vermont	6	Rensselaer	1

=== 1973 ===
Date	Location	Winning Team	Score	Losing Team	Score
22 November	Clarkson Arena	Clarkson	8	Ohio State	3
22 November	Appleton Arena	Toronto	2	St. Lawrence	1
23 November	Clarkson Arena	Toronto	7	Clarkson	1
23 November	Clarkson Arena	Ohio State	6	St. Lawrence	5
24 November	Appleton Arena	Clarkson	4	St. Lawrence	1
24 November	Appleton Arena	Toronto	3	Ohio State	1

=== 1974 ===
Semifinals; November 29
Clarkson	6
Boston University	9
St. Lawrence	5
Bowling Green	6**

Championship; November 30
Boston University	2
Bowling Green	3
Consolation
Clarkson	8
St. Lawrence	1

Note: * denotes overtime period(s)

=== 1975 ===
Date	Location	Winning Team	Score	Losing Team	Score
27 November	Appleton Arena	Concordia	5	Clarkson	1
27 November	Appleton Arena	St. Lawrence	8	Vermont	2
28 November	Appleton Arena	Clarkson	3	Vermont	1
28 November	Appleton Arena	Concordia	6	St. Lawrence	2
29 November	Appleton Arena	Clarkson	5	St. Lawrence	1
29 November	Appleton Arena	Concordia	5	Vermont	2

=== 1976 ===
Date	Location	Winning Team	Score	Losing Team	Score
25 November	Walker Arena	Clarkson	5	New Hampshire	2
25 November	Appleton Arena	Ottawa	4	St. Lawrence	3
26 November	Walker Arena	Clarkson	13	Ottawa	3
26 November	Appleton Arena	New Hampshire	9	St. Lawrence	8
27 November	Appleton Arena	Clarkson	7	St. Lawrence	1
27 November	Appleton Arena	Ottawa	5	New Hampshire	3

=== 1977 ===
Date	Location	Winning Team	Score	Losing Team	Score
24 November	Appleton Arena	Concordia	6	Clarkson	5
24 November	Appleton Arena	Rensselaer	4	St. Lawrence	2
25 November	Walker Arena	Clarkson	5	Rensselaer	4
25 November	Appleton Arena	St. Lawrence	8	Concordia	0
26 November	Appleton Arena	Clarkson	6	St. Lawrence	3
26 November	Appleton Arena	Rensselaer	7	Concordia	3

=== 1978 ===
Date	Location	Winning Team	Score	Losing Team	Score
23 November	Walker Arena	Clarkson	8	Laval	5
24 November	Appleton Arena	St. Lawrence	11	Laval	4
25 November	Appleton Arena	Clarkson	4	St. Lawrence	1

=== 1979 ===
Date	Location	Winning Team	Score	Losing Team	Score
22 November	Appleton Arena	Clarkson	6	Western Ontario	5
22 November	Appleton Arena	Yale	6	St. Lawrence	3
23 November	Walker Arena	Clarkson	8	Yale	7
23 November	Appleton Arena	Western Ontario	9	St. Lawrence	7
24 November	Appleton Arena	Clarkson	6	St. Lawrence	5

=== 1980 ===
Date	Location	Winning Team	Score	Losing Team	Score
27 November	Walker Arena	Clarkson	6	Bowling Green	5
27 November	Appleton Arena	Lowell	7	St. Lawrence	5
28 November	Walker Arena	Clarkson	6	Lowell	2
28 November	Appleton Arena	Bowling Green	6	St. Lawrence	6
29 November	Walker Arena	Clarkson	4	St. Lawrence	2

=== 1981 ===
Date	Location	Winning Team	Score	Losing Team	Score
26 November	Appleton Arena	St. Lawrence	10	Brown	6
27 November	Walker Arena	Clarkson	6	Brown	3
28 November	Appleton Arena	Clarkson	5	St. Lawrence	4
