= Bruce McIntosh =

American ice hockey player (born 1949)

- Born: March 17, 1949 (age 76); Edina, Minnesota, U.S.
- Height: 6 ft 0 in (183 cm)
- Weight: 175 lb (79 kg; 12 st 7 lb)
- Position: Defense
- Shot: Left
- Played for: Minnesota North Stars
- National team: United States
- Playing career: 1967–1973

Bruce Greaves McIntosh (born March 17, 1949) is an American retired ice hockey defenseman who played in two National Hockey League games with the Minnesota North Stars during the 1972–73 season. McIntosh was signed as a free agent by the North Stars after playing for the University of Minnesota men's hockey team. He now co-owns a Golf Course in northern Minnesota.

== Career statistics ==
=== Regular season and playoffs ===
			Regular season					Playoffs
Season	Team	League	GP	G	A	Pts	PIM	GP	G	A	Pts	PIM
1966–67	Edina High School	HS-MN	—	—	—	—	—	—	—	—	—	—
1967–68	University of Minnesota	B1G	—	—	—	—	—	—	—	—	—	—
1968–69	University of Minnesota	B1G	7	0	0	0	0	—	—	—	—	—
1969–70	University of Minnesota	B1G	33	3	12	15	26	—	—	—	—	—
1970–71	University of Minnesota	B1G	33	8	13	21	29	—	—	—	—	—
1971–72	American National Team	Intl	36	5	10	15	17	—	—	—	—	—
1972–73	Minnesota North Stars	NHL	2	0	0	0	0	—	—	—	—	—
1972–73	Saginaw Gears	IHL	30	5	16	21	23	—	—	—	—	—
1972–73	Cleveland/Jacksonville Barons	AHL	23	1	5	6	4	—	—	—	—	—
NHL totals			2	0	0	0	0	—	—	—	—	—

== Awards and honors ==
Award	Year
All-NCAA All-Tournament Team	1971
