= Dave Hynes =

American ice hockey player (born 1951)

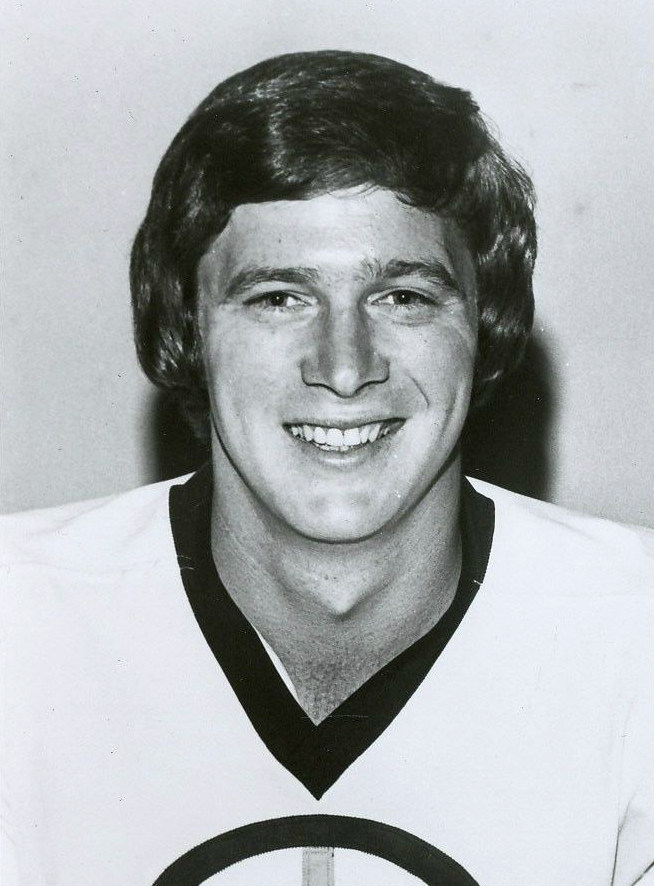
- Dave Hynes 1975
- Born: April 17, 1951 (age 73); Cambridge, Massachusetts, U.S.
- Height: 5 ft 9 in (175 cm)
- Weight: 183 lb (83 kg; 13 st 1 lb)
- Position: Left wing
- Played for: Boston Bruins
- National team: United States
- NHL draft: 56th overall, 1971; Boston Bruins
- Playing career: 1973–1978

David E. Hynes (born April 17, 1951) is an American former professional ice hockey player who played 22 games in the National Hockey League for the Boston Bruins in 1973–75 as well as 22 games in the World Hockey Association for the New England Whalers in 1976–77. He was also a member of the United States national team at the 1972, 1973 and 1977 Ice Hockey World Championship tournaments. He was born in Cambridge, Massachusetts. As a youth, he played in the 1963 Quebec International Pee-Wee Hockey Tournament with his Boston minor ice hockey team. Hynes has the distinction of being the first American born player to be drafted by the Boston Bruins. He was selected in the fourth round, 56th overall, by the Bruins in the 1971 NHL Amateur Draft.

== Career statistics ==
=== Regular season and playoffs ===
			Regular season					Playoffs
Season	Team	League	GP	G	A	Pts	PIM	GP	G	A	Pts	PIM
1964–65	Browne & Nichols School	HS-MA	—	16	18	34	—	—	—	—	—	—
1965–66	Browne & Nichols School	HS-MA	—	38	14	52	—	—	—	—	—	—
1966–67	Browne & Nichols School	HS-MA	—	—	—	—	—	—	—	—	—	—
1967–68	Browne & Nichols School	HS-MA	—	—	—	—	—	—	—	—	—	—
1968–69	Browne & Nichols School	HS-MA	16	52	28	80	—	—	—	—	—	—
1969–70	Harvard University	ECAC	—	—	—	—	—	—	—	—	—	—
1970–71	Harvard University	ECAC	27	26	26	52	16	—	—	—	—	—
1971–72	Harvard University	ECAC	25	23	31	54	40	—	—	—	—	—
1972–73	Harvard University	ECAC	22	15	19	34	12	—	—	—	—	—
1972–73	United States National Team	Intl	7	9	6	15	—	—	—	—	—	—
1973–74	Boston Bruins	NHL	3	0	0	0	0	—	—	—	—	—
1973–74	Boston Braves	AHL	73	35	37	72	22	—	—	—	—	—
1974–75	Boston Bruins	NHL	19	4	0	4	2	—	—	—	—	—
1974–75	Rochester Americans	AHL	59	42	35	77	33	12	2	7	9	6
1975–76	Rochester Americans	AHL	63	37	30	67	20	7	3	2	5	11
1976–77	New England Whalers	WHA	22	5	4	9	4	—	—	—	—	—
1976–77	Rhode Island Reds	AHL	46	22	15	37	8	—	—	—	—	—
1977–78	Springfield Indians	AHL	46	16	30	46	6	4	1	0	1	0
WHA totals			22	5	4	9	4	—	—	—	—	—
NHL totals			22	4	0	4	2	—	—	—	—	—

=== International ===
Year	Team	Event	GP	G	A	Pts	PIM
1972	United States	WC-B	—	—	—	—	—
1973	United States	WC-B	—	—	—	—	—
1977	United States	WC	10	3	4	7	10
Senior totals			10	3	4	7	10

== Awards and honors ==
Award	Year
ECAC Hockey All-Tournament First Team	1971
All-ECAC Hockey Second team	1971–72
AHCA East All-American	1971–72

Awards and achievements
Preceded by Bruce Bullock	ECAC Hockey Most Outstanding Player in Tournament; 1971	Succeeded by John Danby
