= Bob Brown (ice hockey) =

Canadian ice hockey player (born 1950)

- Born: December 18, 1950 (age 75) Toronto, Ontario, Canada
- Height: 6 ft 1 in (185 cm)
- Weight: 194 lb (88 kg; 13 st 12 lb)
- Position: Defence
- Shot: Right
- Played for: Philadelphia Blazers; New York Raiders; New York Golden Blades; Jersey Knights
- NHL draft: 80th overall, 1970; Montreal Canadiens
- Playing career: 1972–1974

Robert Brown (born December 18, 1950) is a Canadian former professional ice hockey player who played in the World Hockey Association (WHA). He played parts of two WHA seasons for the Philadelphia Blazers, New York Raiders, New York Golden Blades and Jersey Knights. Brown was drafted in the sixth round of the 1970 NHL Amateur Draft by the Montreal Canadiens.

As a youth, Brown played in the 1963 Quebec International Pee-Wee Hockey Tournament with the Scarboro Lions minor ice hockey team.

== Awards and honors ==
Award	Year
All-ECAC First Team	1970–71
AHCA East All-American	1970–71
ECAC Hockey All-Tournament Second Team	1971
All-NCAA All-Tournament Team	1971, 1972
All-ECAC First Team	1971–72
AHCA East All-American	1971–72
ECAC Hockey All-Tournament First Team	1972

== Career statistics ==
			Regular season					Playoffs
Season	Team	League	GP	G	A	Pts	PIM	GP	G	A	Pts	PIM
1970–71	Boston University Terriers	ECAC	31	17	43	60	38	—	—	—	—	—
1971–72	Boston University Terriers	ECAC	31	14	36	50	36	—	—	—	—	—
1972–73	New England Blades	EHL	5	0	3	3	12	—	—	—	—	—
1972–73	Rhode Island Eagles	EHL	49	9	25	34	35	—	—	—	—	—
1972–73	Philadelphia Blazers	WHA	4	0	0	0	2	—	—	—	—	—
1972–73	New York Raiders	WHA	17	0	4	4	6	—	—	—	—	—
1973–74	New York Golden Blades/Jersey Knights	WHA	59	7	13	20	38	—	—	—	—	—
WHA totals			80	7	17	24	46	—	—	—	—	—

Awards and achievements
Preceded by Tom Mellor	ECAC Hockey Rookie of the Year; 1970–71	Succeeded by Don Cutts
Preceded by Bruce Bullock	ECAC Hockey Player of the Year; 1971–72	Succeeded by Tom Mellor
