= 1974–75 2nd Bundesliga (ice hockey) season =

The 1974-75 2nd Bundesliga season was the second season of the 2nd Bundesliga, the second level of ice hockey in Germany. 10 teams participated in the league, and EV Rosenheim won the championship, and was promoted to the Ice hockey Bundesliga as a result. EV Landsberg was relegated to the Oberliga

== Regular season ==
	Club	GP	W	T	L	Goals	Pts
1.	EV Rosenheim	36	30	2	4	243:92	62
2.	Augsburger EV	36	26	2	8	233:138	54
3.	Mannheimer ERC	36	24	0	12	206:133	48
4.	EC Deilinghofen	36	20	3	13	173:118	43
5.	SG Nürnberg	36	14	4	18	165: 191	32
6.	Duisburger SC	36	14	0	22	145:181	28
7.	EV Pfronten	36	10	4	22	137:183	24
8.	EC Peiting	36	10	4	22	140:233	24
9.	TEV Miesbach	36	10	3	23	123:230	23
10.	EV Landsberg	36	10	2	24	112:188	22
