= Canton, New York =

- Town
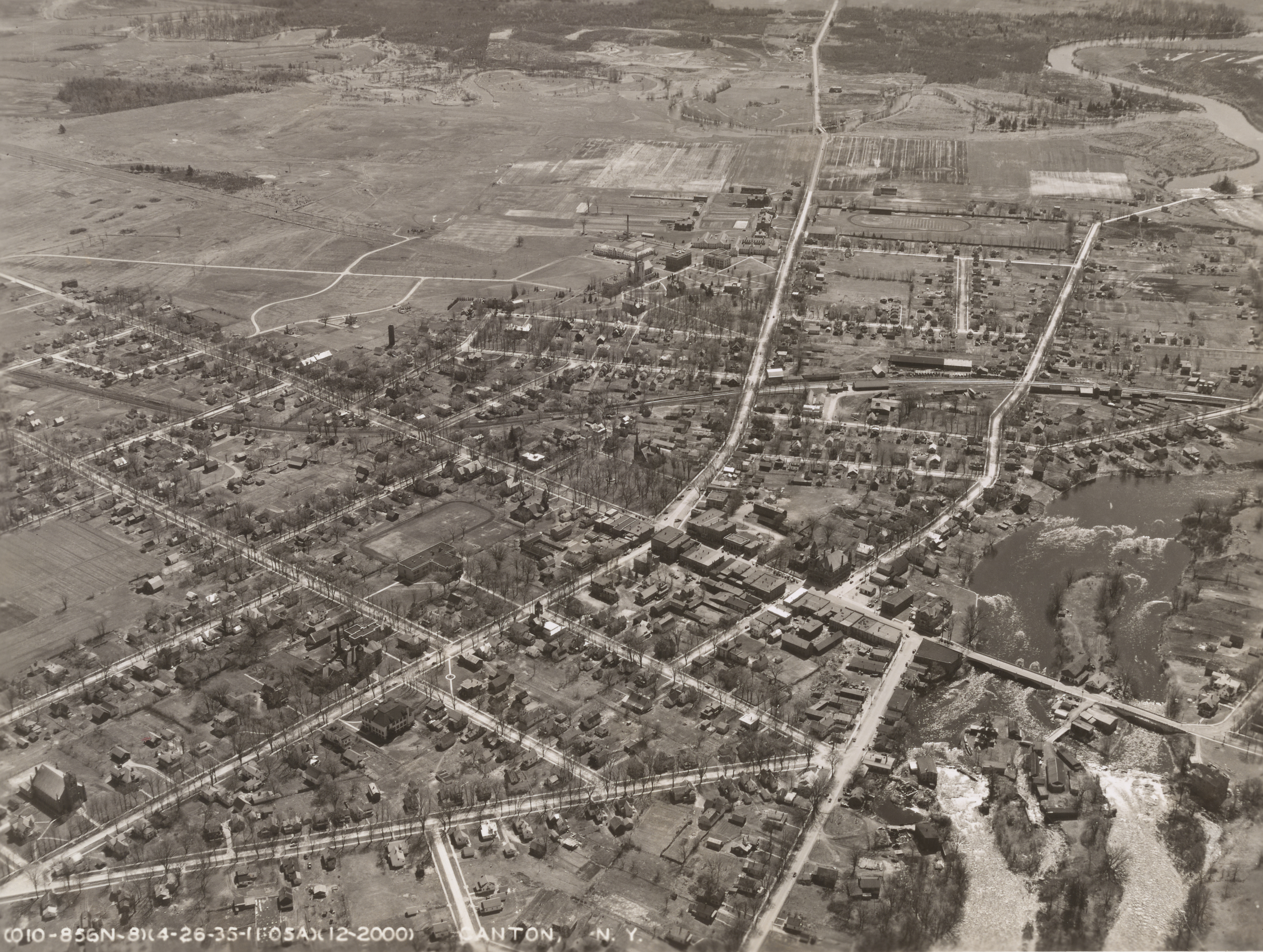
- Canton in 1945

- Seal

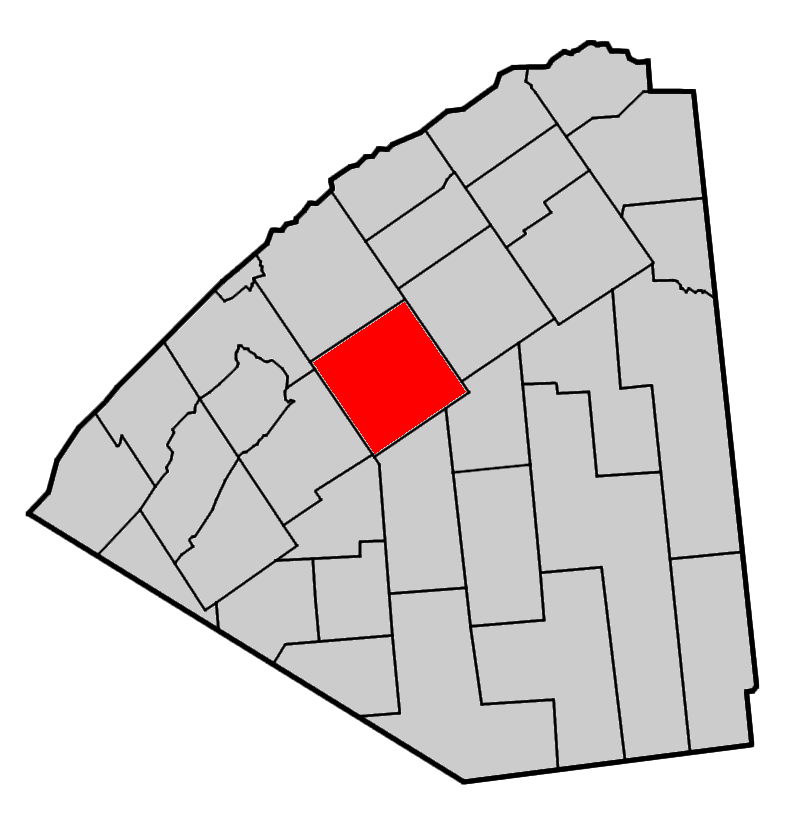
- Map highlighting Canton's location within St. Lawrence County

- Location of Canton in New York
- Coordinates: 44°35′51″N 75°10′16″W
- Country: United States
- State: New York
- County: St. Lawrence
- Established: 1805

Government
  - Village Mayor: Michael E. Dalton
  - Town Supervisor: Mary Ann Ashley

Area
  - Total: 105.86 sq mi (274.18 km^{2})
  - Land: 104.76 sq mi (271.33 km^{2})
  - Water: 1.10 sq mi (2.85 km^{2})

Population (2020)
  - Total: 11,638
  - Density: 106.1/sq mi (40.97/km^{2})
- Demonyms: Cantonian, Cantonite
- Time zone: UTC−5 (EST)
  - Summer (DST): UTC−4 (EDT)
- ZIP code: 13617
- Area code: 315
- Website: cantonny.gov

Canton is an incorporated town in St. Lawrence County, New York, United States. The population was 11,638 at the time of the 2020 census. The town contains two villages: one also named Canton, the other named Rensselaer Falls. The town is named after the great port of Canton (now named Guangzhou) in China. Canton is the home of St. Lawrence University and the State University of New York at Canton. The Canton Central School District is based in the village of Canton.

== History ==
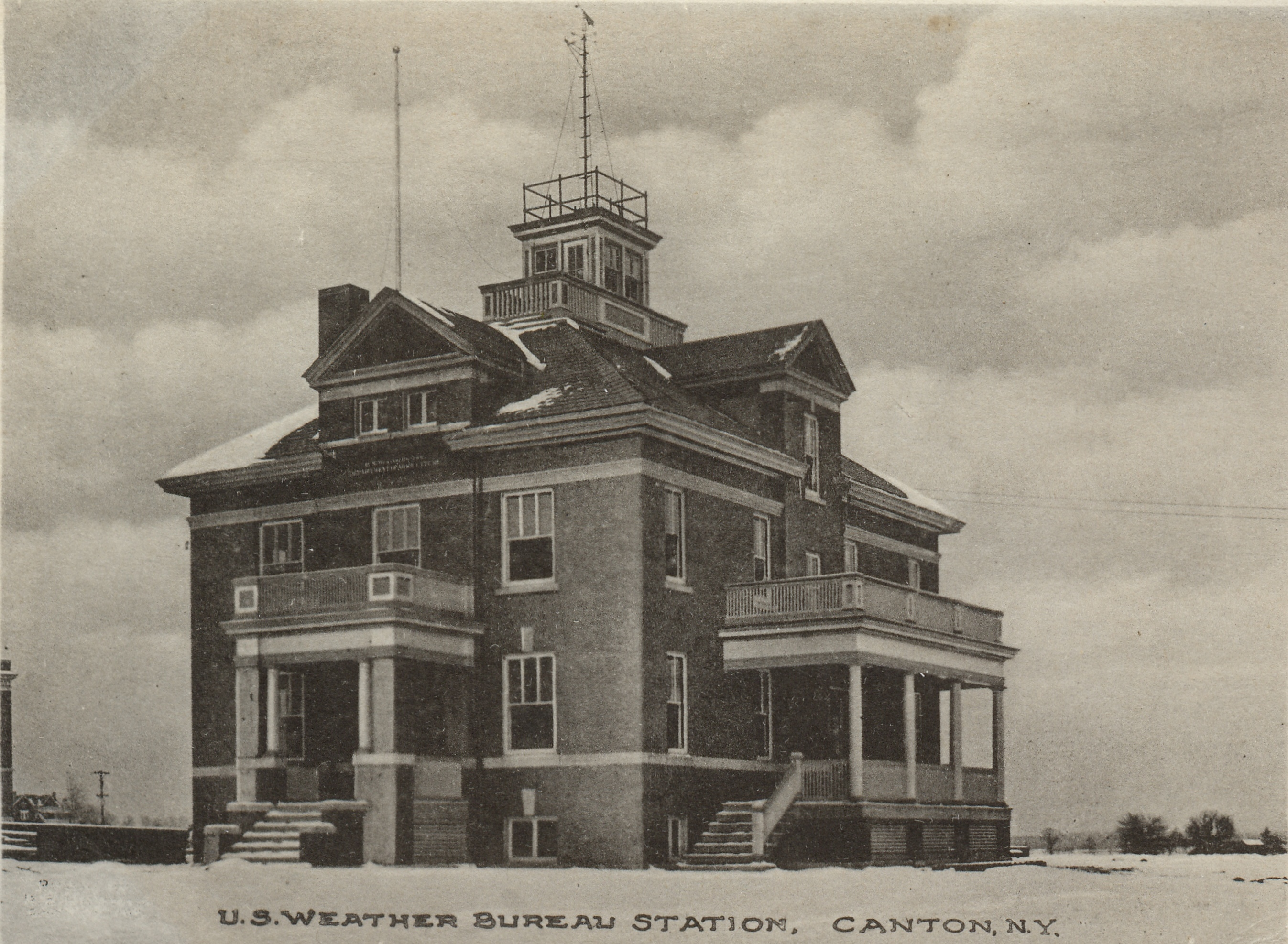
US Weather Bureau station c. 1900

Humans have been present in this region of New York since the Paleo-Indian period which is from about 15,000 to 7,000 BC. Iroquoian peoples arrived between 1,200 and 4,000 years ago, and both the Mohawk and the Oneida consider the Adirondacks to be part of their territory. When white settlers began to arrive, the area was part of the Mohawk Nation, which was part of the Iroquois Confederacy. The Mohawks are known as Kanienkehaka, or "the people of the flint," and they were considered the keepers of the Eastern door for this edge of Haudenosaunee territory. The first settler arrived in 1800. The town was organized/incorporated on May 14, 1805, from part of the town of Lisbon. The name Canton was supposedly selected due to contemporary interests in the China trade. Canton was one of the original ten towns of the county. In 1845, the community of Canton was incorporated as a village with many arrivals from the State of Vermont who resettled to the United States to avoid territorial between the United States and Canada over the 48th Parallel line. The Brick Chapel Church and Cemetery was listed on the National Register of Historic Places in 2005.

== Geography ==
After the War of 1812, the sovereign territory known as Akwesasne was bisected in two when the United States and Great Britain drew a line on a map, creating today's northern border between New York state and Canada. Now the Akwesasne Mohawk reservation sits in both countries, with borders of its own.

According to the United States Census Bureau, the town has a total area of 105.9 square miles (274.3 km^{2}), of which 104.8 square miles (271.4 km^{2}) are land and 1.1 square miles (2.8 km^{2}), or 1.03%, are water.

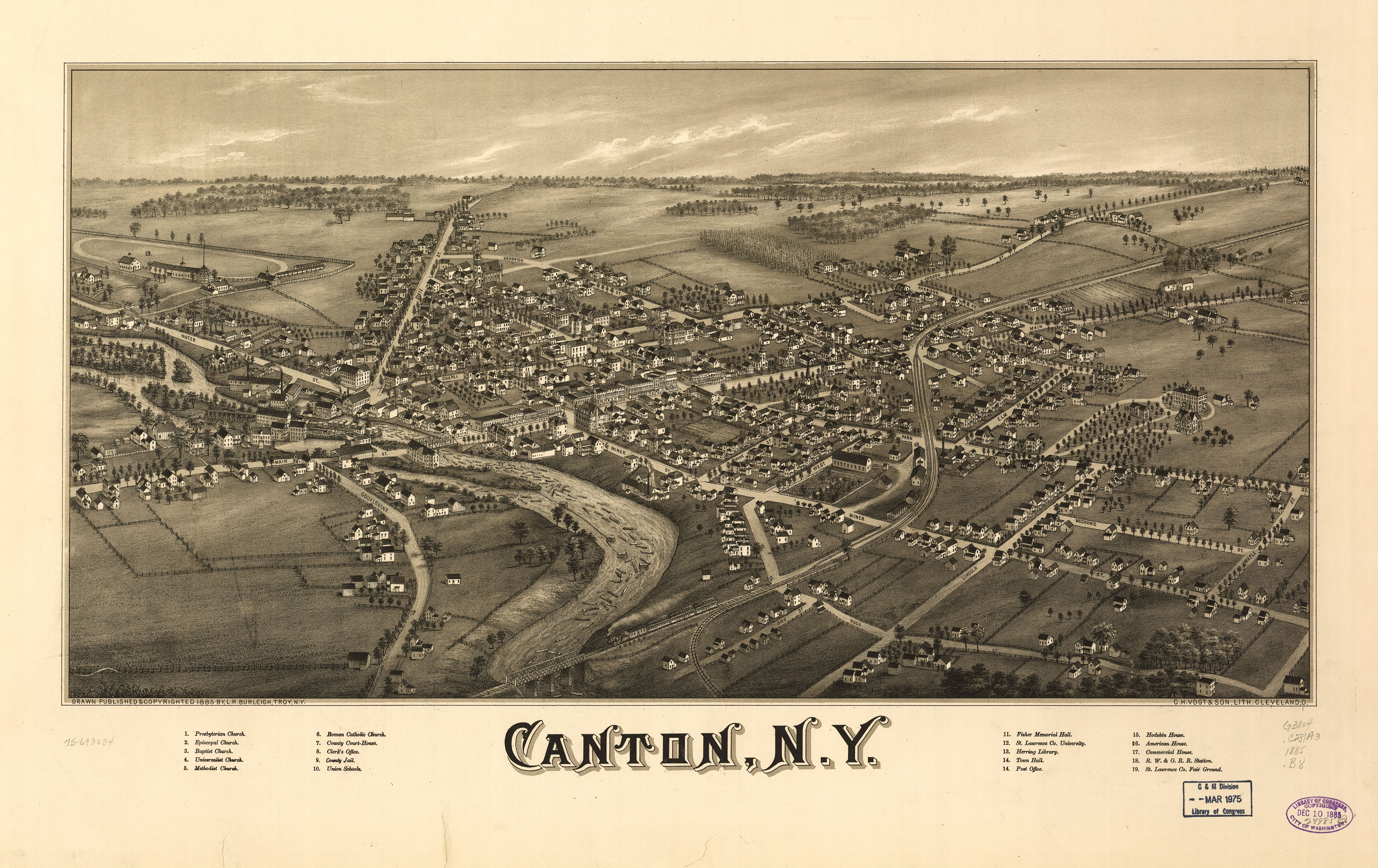
Perspective map of Canton from 1885 with list of landmarks by L.R. Burleigh

The Grasse River flows northward through the centre of St. Lawrence County, and the Oswegatchie River flows through the northwest corner. U.S. Route 11 is a northeast–southwest highway, which intersects New York State Route 68 and New York State Route 310 at Canton village.

=== Climate ===
Climate data for Canton 4 SE, 1991–2020 normals, 1893-2020 extremes: 448ft (137m)
Month	Jan	Feb	Mar	Apr	May	Jun	Jul	Aug	Sep	Oct	Nov	Dec	Year
Record high °F (°C)	66 (19)	65 (18)	80 (27)	89 (32)	93 (34)	95 (35)	98 (37)	99 (37)	93 (34)	87 (31)	77 (25)	70 (21)	99 (37)
Mean maximum °F (°C)	53.3 (11.8)	48.9 (9.4)	61.3 (16.3)	76.8 (24.9)	83.1 (28.4)	87.3 (30.7)	88.6 (31.4)	88.3 (31.3)	85.0 (29.4)	77.3 (25.2)	66.4 (19.1)	55.9 (13.3)	90.7 (32.6)
Mean daily maximum °F (°C)	26.9 (−2.8)	29.9 (−1.2)	38.9 (3.8)	53.3 (11.8)	66.7 (19.3)	75.2 (24.0)	79.6 (26.4)	78.0 (25.6)	70.8 (21.6)	57.8 (14.3)	45.3 (7.4)	33.5 (0.8)	54.7 (12.6)
Daily mean °F (°C)	16.8 (−8.4)	19.1 (−7.2)	29.0 (−1.7)	42.9 (6.1)	55.9 (13.3)	64.9 (18.3)	69.4 (20.8)	67.3 (19.6)	59.8 (15.4)	48.0 (8.9)	36.7 (2.6)	24.8 (−4.0)	44.6 (7.0)
Mean daily minimum °F (°C)	6.6 (−14.1)	8.4 (−13.1)	19.0 (−7.2)	32.5 (0.3)	45.2 (7.3)	54.6 (12.6)	59.2 (15.1)	56.7 (13.7)	48.8 (9.3)	38.2 (3.4)	28.2 (−2.1)	16.0 (−8.9)	34.4 (1.4)
Mean minimum °F (°C)	−21.9 (−29.9)	−16.8 (−27.1)	−6.3 (−21.3)	17.6 (−8.0)	29.4 (−1.4)	39.2 (4.0)	45.7 (7.6)	41.3 (5.2)	32.2 (0.1)	22.4 (−5.3)	8.4 (−13.1)	−8.6 (−22.6)	−25.4 (−31.9)
Record low °F (°C)	−41 (−41)	−43 (−42)	−30 (−34)	−8 (−22)	21 (−6)	29 (−2)	34 (1)	32 (0)	22 (−6)	13 (−11)	−15 (−26)	−37 (−38)	−43 (−42)
Average precipitation inches (mm)	2.23 (57)	1.99 (51)	2.29 (58)	3.05 (77)	3.15 (80)	3.82 (97)	3.92 (100)	3.41 (87)	3.94 (100)	4.85 (123)	2.91 (74)	2.63 (67)	38.19 (971)
Average snowfall inches (cm)	18.90 (48.0)	17.50 (44.5)	12.50 (31.8)	3.50 (8.9)	0.00 (0.00)	0.00 (0.00)	0.00 (0.00)	0.00 (0.00)	0.00 (0.00)	0.20 (0.51)	5.10 (13.0)	19.60 (49.8)	77.3 (196.51)
Source 1: NOAA
Source 2: XMACIS (temp records & monthly max/mins)

== Demographics ==
Historical population
Census	Pop.	Note	%±
1820	1,337		—
1830	2,440		82.5%
1840	3,465		42.0%
1850	4,685		35.2%
1860	6,379		36.2%
1870	6,014		−5.7%
1880	6,275		4.3%
1890	6,096		−2.9%
1900	6,387		4.8%
1910	6,151		−3.7%
1920	6,497		5.6%
1930	6,795		4.6%
1940	6,138		−9.7%
1950	7,652		24.7%
1960	8,935		16.8%
1970	10,348		15.8%
1980	11,568		11.8%
1990	11,120		−3.9%
2000	10,334		−7.1%
2010	10,995		6.4%
2020	11,638		5.8%
U.S. Decennial Census

As of 2000, the census reported that there were 10,334 people, 3,198 households, and 2,011 families residing in the town. The population density was 98.6 inhabitants per square mile (38.1/km^{2}). There were 3,515 housing units at an average density of 33.5 per square mile (12.9/km^{2}). 91.81% White, 4.49% Black or African American, 0.54% Native American, 0.99% Asian, 1.02% from other races, and 1.16% from two or more races. Hispanic or Latino of any race were 1.92% of the population. There were 3,198 households, out of which 31.8% had children under the age of 18 living with them, 49.3% were married couples living together, 9.8% had a female householder with no husband present, and 37.1% were non-families. 29.8% of all households were made up of individuals, and 11.0% had someone living alone who was 65 years of age or older. The average household size was 2.40 and the average family size was 2.99.

In the town, the population was spread out, with 18.9% under the age of 18, 29.6% from 18 to 24, 21.8% from 25 to 44, 18.4% from 45 to 64, and 11.4% who were 65 years of age or older. The median age was 27 years. For every 100 females, there were 99.7 males. For every 100 females age 18 and over, there were 98.6 males.

The median income for a household in the town was $36,875, and the median income for a family was $43,819. Males had a median income of $33,993 versus $25,989 for females. The per capita income for the town was $14,896. About 9.2% of families and 12.4% of the population were below the poverty line, including 13.6% of those under age 18 and 7.5% of those age 65 or over.

== Transportation ==
U.S. Route 11 runs through Canton and is served by Adirondack Trailways, with stops in Gouverneur, Watertown and Syracuse to the west, and Potsdam, Malone and Rouses Point to the east. To the north on New York State Route 68, Ogdensburg borders Canada at the Johnstown crossing, which in turn is an hour from the capital, Ottawa.

The CSX Transportation former New York Central Railroad St. Lawrence Division runs through the town. Until 1964 the New York Central operated passenger trains from Massena, through the town, to Watertown, and to Syracuse to meet up with the NYC mainline.

== Communities and locations in the Town of Canton ==
- Crary Mills – A hamlet southwest of Canton village.
- Brick Chapel – A hamlet south of Canton village on County Road 27.
- Canton – A village centrally located in the town by the Grasse River and US-11.
- Eddy – A hamlet in the southwestern corner of the town on US-11.
- Morley – A hamlet on the northern town line by the Grasse River at the intersection of County Roads 14 and 27. The community was originally known as "Long Rapids."
- Pyrites – A hamlet in the southwestern corner of the town on US-11.
- Rensselaer Falls – A village in the northwestern corner of the town on County Roads 14 and 15.
- St. Lawrence University – A university in Canton village.
- SUNY Canton – A state college northwest of Canton village.
- Upper and Lower Lakes State Wildlife Area
- Woodbridge Corners – A location NY-68 northwest of Canton village.

== Notable people ==
- Irving Bacheller, writer and journalist
- Charles Edward Bennett, Florida congressman, was born in Canton
- Dan Brady, ice hockey player for Boston University and Western Hockey League
- Greg Carvel, UMass ice hockey head coach
- Cynthia Eloise Cleveland, lawyer and writer, born in Canton
- Theodore Conkey, Wisconsin politician
- Jordan Greenway, NHL player for the Buffalo Sabres
- A. Barton Hepburn, financier, philanthropist and U.S. Comptroller of the Currency
- Dave Jennings, professional American football player; played for St. Lawrence University
- David O'Brien Martin, New York politician and attorney
- Wade Megan, ice hockey player
- Wayne L. Nicholson, microbiologist and scientist
- Frederic Remington, artist
- William Pierce Rogers, United States Secretary of State
- Matthew Skoller, Chicago blues harmonicist, singer, songwriter, and record producer
- Hobart Stocking (1846–1920), Wisconsin legislator
- Silas Wright, New York State Governor
