= Steve Dolloff =

American ice hockey player

- Born: 1951 (age 74–75) Melrose, Massachusetts, USA
- Height: 5 ft 10 in (178 cm)
- Weight: 180 lb (82 kg; 12 st 12 lb)
- Position: Center
- Played for: Boston University; Oklahoma City Blazers; Tidewater Sharks
- Playing career: 1970–1976

Steve "The Growler" Dolloff is an American retired ice hockey center who was an All-American for Boston University and helped the program win its first two national championships.

== Career ==
Dolloff began attending Boston University in 1969, playing on the freshman team, and nearly had his career ended by a serious injury. While playing against Dartmouth, Dolloff took a stick in the eye and was rushed to the hospital. Both eyes were bandaged for nearly a week and there were fears that he would lose the sight in one eye but he managed to make a full recovery. Dolloff joined the varsity team the following season and provided depth scoring for the Terriers, helping the club go 28–2–1 while winning their first NCAA championship.

He continued to chip in when needed in 1972 as the Terriers captured both the conference and national championships, joining a very short list of players to win back-to-back national titles. As a senior, Dolloff was at the center of the offense and finished second on the team with 52 points, improving his career high by 15 points. Unfortunately, the two-time champions were upset by Pennsylvania in the first round of the conference tournament and weren't able to defend their crown. Dolloff, however, was named to the All-American team at the end of the season.

After graduating, Dolloff joined the Oklahoma City Blazers, a farm team for the Toronto Maple Leafs, and played two seasons of professional hockey. Despite being one of the team top scorers, and helping the Blazers reach the Adams Cup final in 1974, Dolloff never played above the minor league level and he retired after one more season with the Tidewater Sharks.

== Career statistics ==
=== Regular season and playoffs ===
			Regular Season					Playoffs
Season	Team	League	GP	G	A	Pts	PIM	GP	G	A	Pts	PIM
1970–71	Boston University	ECAC Hockey	31	15	22	37	8	—	—	—	—	—
1971–72	Boston University	ECAC Hockey	31	9	19	28	26	—	—	—	—	—
1972–73	Boston University	ECAC Hockey	29	16	36	52	26	—	—	—	—	—
1973–74	Oklahoma City Blazers	CHL	72	17	37	54	38	10	2	7	9	9
1974–75	Oklahoma City Blazers	CHL	72	23	36	59	33	5	2	1	3	6
1975–76	Tidewater Sharks	SHL	69	17	36	53	48	—	—	—	—	—
NCAA Totals			91	40	77	117	60	—	—	—	—	—
CHL Totals			144	40	73	113	71	—	—	—	—	—

== Awards and honors ==
Award	Year
All-ECAC Hockey Second Team	1972–73
AHCA East All-American	1972–73
