= Dan Brady (ice hockey) =

American ice hockey player (born 1950)

- Born: August 25, 1950 (age 75) Canton, New York, U.S.
- Height: 5 ft 11 in (180 cm)
- Weight: 181 lb (82 kg; 12 st 13 lb)
- Position: Goaltender
- Played for: Seattle Totems; Tulsa Oilers; Erie Blades; Charlotte Checkers
- NHL draft: Undrafted
- Playing career: 1972–1977

Dan Brady (born August 25, 1950) is an American former professional ice hockey goaltender.

== Early life ==
Brady was born in Canton, New York. He attended Boston University, where he played NCAA Division I college hockey with the Boston University Terriers men's ice hockey team from 1968 to 1972. He was selected as the most outstanding player of the 1971 NCAA University Division Men's Ice Hockey Tournament and was named to the 1971–72 NCAA (East) First All-American team. He also played for the United States national team at the 1972 Ice Hockey World Championships pool B tournament in Romania.

== Career ==
Brady began his professional career in 1972 by joining the Seattle Totems of the Western Hockey League. Over the next five years, he played with four teams in five leagues before retiring.

In 1992, Brady was inducted into the Boston University Hall of Fame.

== Awards and honors ==
Award	Year
NCAA Ice Hockey Tournament Most Outstanding Player	1971
All-ECAC First Team	1971–72
AHCA East All-American	1971–72

Awards and achievements
Preceded by Dan Lodboa	NCAA Tournament Most Outstanding Player; 1971	Succeeded by Tim Regan
