= Bob Gryp =

Canadian ice hockey player

- Born: May 6, 1950 (age 76) Chatham, Ontario, Canada
- Height: 6 ft 1 in (185 cm)
- Weight: 190 lb (86 kg; 13 st 8 lb)
- Position: Left wing
- Shot: Left
- Played for: Boston Bruins; Washington Capitals
- NHL draft: 50th overall, 1970; Toronto Maple Leafs
- Playing career: 1969–1978

Robert Douglas Gryp (born May 6, 1950) is a Canadian former professional ice hockey player.

Originally selected by the Toronto Maple Leafs in the 1970 NHL entry draft, Gryp played for the Boston Bruins and Washington Capitals.

== Career statistics ==
			Regular season					Playoffs
Season	Team	League	GP	G	A	Pts	PIM	GP	G	A	Pts	PIM
1968–69	Boston University	NCAA	17	9	17	26	18	—	—	—	—	—
1969–70	Boston University	NCAA	27	12	17	29	20	—	—	—	—	—
1970–71	Boston University	NCAA	30	20	19	39	51	—	—	—	—	—
1971–72	Boston University	NCAA	31	9	36	45	14	—	—	—	—	—
1972–73	Boston Braves	AHL	76	38	28	66	99	7	3	1	4	4
1973–74	Boston Bruins	NHL	1	0	0	0	0	—	—	—	—	—
1973–74	Boston Braves	AHL	66	30	18	48	62	—	—	—	—	—
1974–75	Washington Capitals	NHL	27	5	8	13	21	—	—	—	—	—
1974–75	Richmond Robins	AHL	49	10	11	21	94	—	—	—	—	—
1975–76	Washington Capitals	NHL	46	6	5	11	12	—	—	—	—	—
1975–76	Richmond Robins	AHL	9	2	2	4	10	—	—	—	—	—
1975–76	New Haven Nighthawks	AHL	22	10	9	19	28	3	0	0	0	14
1976–77	Johnstown Jets	NAHL-Sr.	2	1	0	1	0	—	—	—	—	—
1977–78	Long Beach Sharks	PHL	5	1	0	1	14	—	—	—	—	—
NHL totals			74	11	13	24	33	—	—	—	—	—
AHL totals			222	90	68	158	293	10	3	1	4	18
