= 1970–71 NCAA University Division men's ice hockey season =

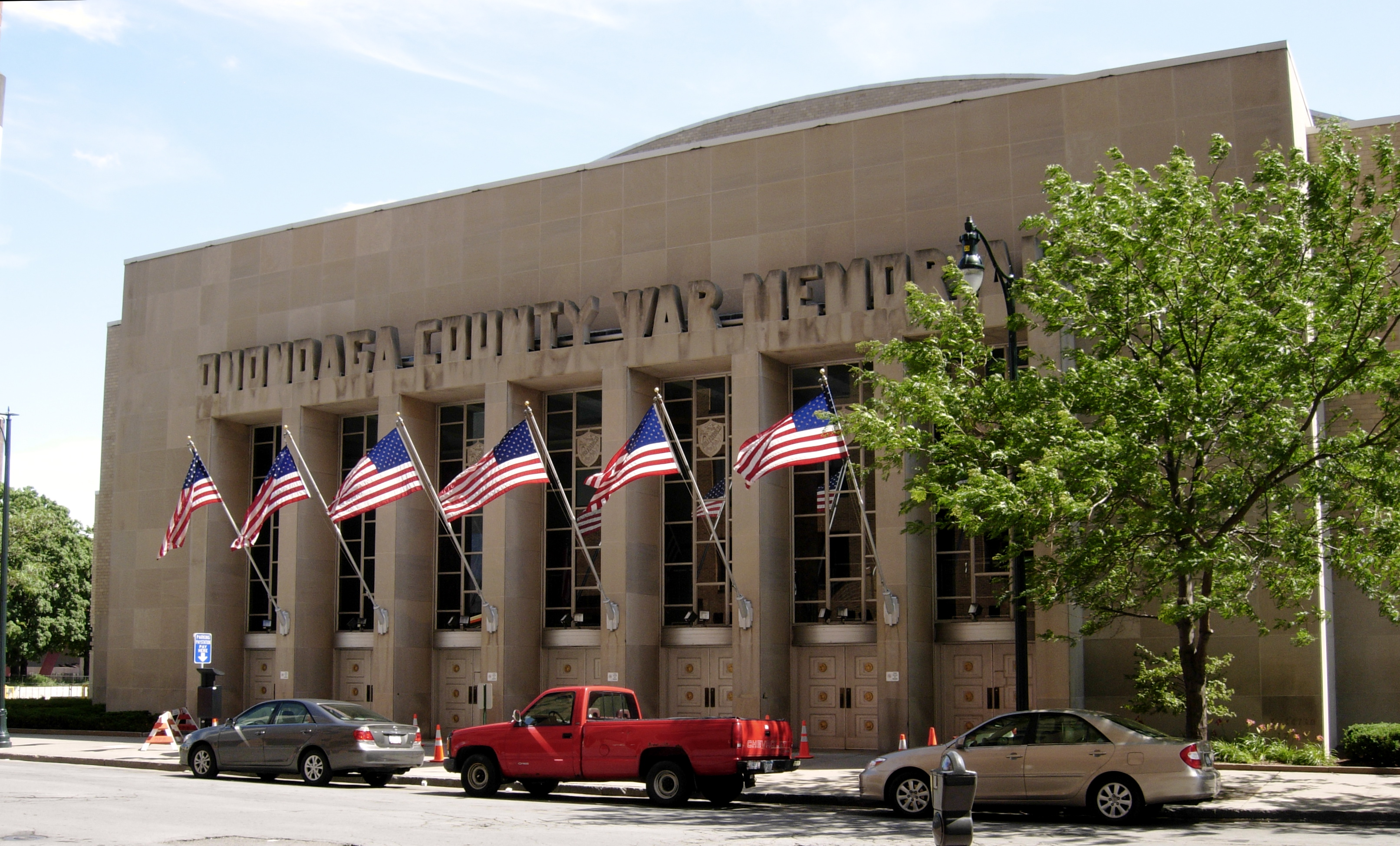
- The Onondaga War Memorial served as the host for the 1971 Tournament
- Duration: November 1970– March 20, 1971
- NCAA tournament: 1971
- National championship: Onondaga War Memorial; Syracuse, New York
- NCAA champion: Boston University

The 1970–71 NCAA University Division men's ice hockey season began in November 1970 and concluded with the 1971 NCAA University Division Men's Ice Hockey Tournament's championship game on March 20, 1971 at the Onondaga War Memorial in Syracuse, New York. This was the 24th season in which an NCAA ice hockey championship was held and is the 77th year overall where an NCAA school fielded a team.

Saint Louis begins to sponsor their ice hockey program as an independent.

== Season Outlook ==
=== Pre-season poll ===
The top teams in the nation as voted on by coaches.

Gary Bender, sports director of WKOW television and radio stations in Madison, Wisconsin, started compiling a national poll in 1970. The poll lasted one season.

WKOW Poll
Rank	Team
1	Boston University
2	Minnesota Duluth
3	Michigan Tech
4	Colorado College
5 (tie)	Harvard
5 (tie)	Wisconsin
7	North Dakota
8	Denver
9	Cornell
10	Clarkson

== Regular season ==
=== Season tournaments ===
Tournament	Dates	Teams	Champion
North Country Thanksgiving Festival	November 26–28	4	Clarkson
ECAC Christmas Hockey Tournament	December 18–19	4	Cornell
ECAC Holiday Hockey Festival	December 21–22	4	Harvard
St. Louis Invitational	December 27–28	4	Wisconsin
Boston Arena Christmas Tournament	December 28–29	4	Boston University
Great Lakes Invitational	December 29–30	4	Michigan Tech
Nichols School Invitational	January 1–2	4	Dartmouth
Rensselaer Holiday Tournament	January 2–4	4	Wisconsin
Beanpot	February 8, 22	4	Boston University

=== Standings ===
1970–71 Big Ten standings
	Conference							Overall					
	GP	W	L	T	Pct.	GF	GA	GP	W	L	T	GF	GA
Michigan State†	12	8	4	0	.667	56	47	31	19	12	0	152	124
Wisconsin	12	7	5	0	.583	51	40	34	20	13	1	180	110
Minnesota	10	5	5	0	.500	38	42	32	14	17	1	116	128
Michigan	10	2	8	0	.200	40	56	30	9	21	0	118	147
† indicates conference regular season champion

1970–71 ECAC Hockey standings
	Conference							Overall					
	GP	W	L	T	Pct.	GF	GA	GP	W	L	T	GF	GA
Boston University†	20	18	1	1	.925	139	42	31	28	2	1	210	60
Clarkson	19	16	2	1	.868	76	38	33	28	4	1	151	75
Cornell	20	17	3	0	.850	111	44	27	22	5	0	159	63
Harvard*	21	15	5	1	.738	124	55	27	18	8	1	146	74
Brown	19	13	6	0	.684	70	63	24	13	10	0	77	87
Providence	19	12	7	0	.632	94	70	28	17	11	0	141	106
Pennsylvania	19	11	8	0	.579	90	74	25	14	11	0	129	93
Rensselaer	14	7	5	2	.571	119	81	25	16	7	2	125	95
New Hampshire	20	11	9	0	.550	119	92	29	20	9	0	210	112
Boston College	21	9	12	0	.429	92	112	26	11	15	0	121	141
Army	11	3	7	1	.318	32	48	23	8	14	1	81	80
St. Lawrence	17	5	12	0	.294	57	73	24	10	14	0	105	97
Dartmouth	21	6	15	0	.286	76	106	24	9	15	0	96	114
Yale	20	5	15	0	.250	64	105	24	6	17	1	74	127
Colgate	17	4	13	0	.235	54	111	24	7	17	0	87	156
Northeastern	19	3	16	0	.158	35	122	29	7	22	0	77	175
Princeton	21	1	20	0	.048	54	140	23	1	22	0	56	155
Championship: Harvard † indicates conference regular season champion * indicates conference tournament champion

1970–71 Independent College Athletic Conference standings
	Conference							Overall					
	GP	W	L	T	PTS	GF	GA	GP	W	L	T	GF	GA
Clarkson†	4	3	0	1	7	19	7	33	28	4	1	151	175
St. Lawrence	4	2	2	0	4	12	10	24	10	14	0	105	97
Rensselaer	4	0	3	1	1	7	20	25	16	7	2	125	95
† indicates conference regular season champion

1970–71 NCAA University Division Independent ice hockey standings
	Conference							Overall					
	GP	W	L	T	PTS	GF	GA	GP	W	L	T	GF	GA
Air Force	0	0	0	0	-	-	-	28	15	11	2	132	121
Alaska–Fairbanks	0	0	0	0	-	-	-	28	13	14	1	-	-
Notre Dame	0	0	0	0	-	-	-	31	13	16	2	116	137
Ohio State	0	0	0	0	-	-	-	29	20	9	0	160	78
Saint Louis	0	0	0	0	-	-	-	30	9	19	2		

1970–71 Western Collegiate Hockey Association standings
	Conference							Overall					
	GP	W	L	T	PCT	GF	GA	GP	W	L	T	GF	GA
Michigan Tech†	22	18	4	0	.818	112	62	33	25	6	2	173	105
Denver*	22	15	7	0	.682	114	92	36	25	10	1	178	133
Wisconsin	22	13	9	0	.591	102	77	34	20	13	1	180	110
Michigan State	22	12	10	0	.545	101	97	31	19	12	0	152	124
Minnesota*	22	9	12	1	.432	77	88	32	14	17	1	116	128
Minnesota-Duluth	24	10	14	0	.417	98	106	34	16	17	1	147	146
North Dakota	26	10	15	1	.404	92	116	33	14	17	2	123	141
Colorado College	18	7	11	0	.389	81	100	29	11	17	1	142	168
Michigan	22	5	17	0	.227	77	116	30	9	21	0	118	147
Championship: Minnesota, Denver † indicates conference regular season champion * indicates conference tournament champion

=== Final regular season poll ===
The final top 10 teams were compiled before the conference tournaments.

WKOW Coaches Poll
Ranking	Team
1	Boston University (11)
2	Michigan Tech (2)
3	Denver
4	Cornell
5	Clarkson
6	Wisconsin
7	Michigan State
8	Harvard
9	Brown
10	Minnesota Duluth

== 1971 NCAA Tournament ==
Semifinals; March 18–19
E1	Harvard	5
W2	Minnesota	6*
W1	Denver	2
E2	Boston University	4

National Championship; March 20
W2	Minnesota	2
E2	Boston University	4
Third Place Game
W1	Denver	1
E2	Harvard	0

Note: * denotes overtime period(s)

== Player stats ==
=== Scoring leaders ===
The following players led the league in points at the conclusion of the season.

GP = Games played; G = Goals; A = Assists; Pts = Points; PIM = Penalty minutes

Player	Class	Team	GP	G	A	Pts	PIM
Louis Frigon	Senior	New Hampshire	29	38	48	86	58
Joe Cavanagh	Senior	Harvard	27	22	50	72	-
Steve Stirling	Senior	Boston University	31	27	43	70	20
Ray Meyers	Freshman	Ohio State	-	27	39	66	-
John Danby	Junior	Boston University	31	28	36	64	10
Rich Pumple	Junior	Providence	-	22	41	63	46
Bill Munroe	Senior	New Hampshire	29	21	39	60	18
Bob Brown	Junior	Boston University	31	17	43	60	38
Mike McShane	Senior	New Hampshire	29	15	43	58	90
Jerry Kemp	Junior	Clarkson	32	26	31	57	16
Bob Collyard	Senior	Colorado College	30	20	37	57	6
Don Thompson	Sophomore	Michigan State	31	19	38	57	35

=== Leading goaltenders ===
The following goaltenders led the league in goals against average at the end of the regular season while playing at least 33% of their team's total minutes.

GP = Games played; Min = Minutes played; W = Wins; L = Losses; OT = Overtime/shootout losses; GA = Goals against; SO = Shutouts; SV% = Save percentage; GAA = Goals against average

Player	Class	Team	GP	Min	W	L	OT	GA	SO	SV%	GAA
Joseph Bertagna	Freshman	Harvard	13	-	-	-	-	-	-	-	1.60
Tim Regan	Junior	Boston University	14	780	-	-	-	23	-	.929	1.77
Dan Brady	Junior	Boston University	18	1060	-	-	-	36	-	.917	2.04
Gary Enberg	Senior	Wisconsin	10	498	5	4	0	19	1	.930	2.29
Bruce Bullock	Senior	Clarkson	30	1800	27	1	1	71	1	.920	2.37
Brian Cropper	Senior	Cornell	25	1410	19	5	0	57	-	.923	2.43
John Anderson	Senior	Wisconsin	14	750	9	3	1	32	0	.825	2.56
Bruce Durno	Senior	Harvard	-	-	-	-	-	-	5	-	2.60
Bill McKenzie	Junior	Ohio State	24	1420	-	-	-	65	2	-	2.74
Chad Ramsdell	Freshman	New Hampshire	-	-	-	-	-	-	-	-	2.78

== Awards ==
=== NCAA ===
Award		Recipient
Spencer Penrose Award		Cooney Weiland, Harvard
Most Outstanding Player in NCAA Tournament		Dan Brady, Boston University
AHCA All-American Teams
East Team	Position	West Team
Bruce Bullock, Clarkson	G	Morris Trewin, Michigan Tech
Bob Brown, Boston University	D	Mike Christie, Denver
Steve Warr, Clarkson	D	Bob Murray, Michigan Tech
Joe Cavanagh, Harvard	F	Walt Ledingham, Minnesota-Duluth
Kevin Pettit, Cornell	F	Don Thompson, Michigan State
Steve Stirling, Boston University	F	Vic Venasky, Denver

=== ECAC ===
Award		Recipient
Player of the Year		Bruce Bullock, Clarkson
Rookie of the Year		Bob Brown, Boston University
Most Outstanding Player in Tournament		Dave Hynes, Harvard
All-ECAC Hockey Teams
First Team	Position	Second Team
Bruce Bullock, Clarkson	G	Brian Cropper, Cornell
Bob Brown, Boston University	D	Tom Mellor, Boston College
Steve Warr, Clarkson	D	Ric Jordan, Boston University
Joe Cavanagh, Harvard	F	Jerry Kemp, Clarkson
John Danby, Boston University	F	Brian McCutcheon, Cornell
Steve Stirling, Boston University	F	Kevin Pettit, Cornell

=== WCHA ===
Award		Recipient
Most Valuable Player		Bob Murray, Michigan Tech
Freshman of the Year		Mike Usitalo, Michigan Tech
Coach of the Year		John MacInnes, Michigan Tech
All-WCHA Teams
First Team	Position	Second Team
Morris Trewin, Michigan Tech	G	Chico Resch, Minnesota-Duluth
Mike Christie, Denver	D	John Jagger, Wisconsin
Bob Murray, Michigan Tech	D	Wally Olds, Minnesota
Walt Ledingham, Minnesota-Duluth	F	Murray Heatley, Wisconsin
Don Thompson, Michigan State	F	Vic Venasky, Denver
Bob Collyard, Colorado College	F	Mike Usitalo, Michigan Tech

== 1971 NHL Amateur Draft ==
Round	Pick	Player	College	Conference	NHL team
1	8	Larry Wright ^{‡}	Minnesota–Duluth	WCHA	Philadelphia Flyers
3	31	Jim Cahoon	North Dakota	WCHA	Montreal Canadiens
3	34	Vic Venasky	Denver	WCHA	Los Angeles Kings
4	53	Greg Hubick	Minnesota–Duluth	WCHA	Montreal Canadiens
4	56	Dave Hynes	Harvard	ECAC Hockey	Boston Bruins
5	58	Earl Anderson	North Dakota	WCHA	Detroit Red Wings
5	60	Dave Murphy	North Dakota	WCHA	Pittsburgh Penguins
5	61	Steve Warr	Clarkson	ECAC Hockey	Buffalo Sabres
5	62	Gary Crosby	Michigan Tech	WCHA	Los Angeles Kings
5	67	Mike Busniuk	Denver	WCHA	Montreal Canadiens
5	68	Dean Blais	Minnesota	WCHA	Chicago Black Hawks
6	74	Ian Williams	Notre Dame	Independent	Pittsburgh Penguins
7	86	Jim Nahrgang	Michigan Tech	WCHA	Detroit Red Wings
7	87	Bill Green	Notre Dame	Independent	Vancouver Canucks
7	88	Doug Elliott	Harvard	ECAC Hockey	Pittsburgh Penguins
7	89	Peter Harasym	Clarkson	ECAC Hockey	Los Angeles Kings
7	91	Bruce Abbey ^{†}	Michigan Tech	WCHA	Minnesota North Stars
8	100	Bob Boyd	Michigan State	WCHA	Detroit Red Wings
8	101	Norm Cherrey	Wisconsin	WCHA	Vancouver Canucks
8	103	Lorne Stamler	Michigan Tech	WCHA	Los Angeles Kings
8	106	Jerome Mrazek	Minnesota–Duluth	WCHA	Philadelphia Flyers
9	113	Mike Antonovich	Minnesota	WCHA	Minnesota North Stars

† incoming freshman
‡ Wright had left school the year before

== See also ==
- 1970–71 NCAA College Division men's ice hockey season
