= 1971–72 Boston University Terriers men's ice hockey season =

National champion ECAC Christmas Hockey Tournament, champion Beanpot, champion ECAC Hockey tournament, champion NCAA tournament, champion
- Conference: 3rd ECAC Hockey
- Home ice: Walter Brown Arena

Record
- Overall: 26–4–1
- Conference: 15–4–1
- Home: 12–1–1
- Road: 5–2–0
- Neutral: 9–1

Coaches and captains
- Head coach: Jack Kelley
- Assistant coaches: Bob Crocker; Jack Parker; Andy Fila
- Captain: John Danby

The 1971–72 Boston University Terriers men's ice hockey team represented Boston University in college ice hockey. In its 10th year under head coach Jack Kelley the team compiled a 26–4–1 record and reached the NCAA tournament for the eighth time. The Terriers defeated Cornell 4–0 in the championship game at the Boston Garden in Boston, Massachusetts to win their second consecutive national championship.

== Season ==
=== Fast start ===
Coming on the heels of their first national championship, Boston University opened their season in a brand new home rink, the Walter Brown Arena. The Terriers would no longer have to share their home ice with Northeastern and christened their new home with a win over Yale. BU visited Brown for their next game and shut out the opposition for the first of four times on the season. The Terriers returned home and escaped with a narrow 2–1 win over New Hampshire then welcomed Harvard four days later and the two Boston powerhouses fought to a 4–4 draw. The Terriers rounded out the first part of the schedule with a pair of wins, the first at Princeton and then home against Ohio, the only ever meeting between the two schools.

=== Holiday Tournaments ===
With the Boston Arena Christmas Tournament now retired, BU signed on to play in both the ECAC Christmas Hockey Tournament and the Syracuse Invitational over their winter break. In the ECAC series Boston University opened against Northeastern and downed the hapless Huskies 4–1 to advance. The Terriers then faced Rensselaer in the final and dominated the competition to get their second shutout on the season and capture the tournament crown.

Just before the first of the year the Terriers headed to Syracuse and took on Minnesota for a rematch of the previous year's national championship. The Gophers put up a much better fight and the two squads fought to a 3–3 tie after 60 minutes. Because this was a tournament game, however, the two teams would continue until someone scored the deciding goal. In the end it was the Terriers who came out victorious and earned the right to face Cornell for the championship. From the start it was apparent that BU was the better team but even with the Terriers outshooting the Big Red 12–5 it was Cornell who scored first. A power play goal mid-way through the second allowed BU to the tie the game followed by a second marker 4 minutes later. BU continued to out chance their opponent but Dan Brady faltered n the third and allowed two goals on only six shots while Dave Elenbaas shut the door on Kelley's boys to take the championship and improve to 7–0 on the season.

The loss to Cornell was only a minor setback for the Terriers but they had already suffered a big loss when after an exhibition game against the US Olympic Team co-starting goalie Tim Regan was lured away to play for the national team. With the Terriers still had the starter from the previous year's championship team in Brady, the duo had split the BU net for the previous two seasons and the Terriers were entering uncharted waters.

=== Life Without Regan ===
The Terriers returned to their regular season with an easy game against College Division Merrimack then hit the road to take on Clarkson, and were soundly beaten by the Golden Knights 2–6. BU rebounded the next night against St. Lawrence before returning home to take on cross-town nemesis Boston College. After defeating the Eagles BU welcomed in two College Division opponents and despite receiving a tough game from eventual ECAC 2 champion Massachusetts, the Terriers were in the midst of a win streak.

After wins at Providence and home against Saint Louis Regan returned to the team. In his agreement to play for the national team head coach Murray Williamson would allow Regan to return to BU if Regan was not going to be the starter for the team at the Olympics. When the team decided to stick with Mike Curran and Peter Sears Regan left in the middle of the games to rejoin the Terriers, but with the squad streaking Dan Brady remained in goal.

=== Beanpot ===
Boston University opened the 20th Beanpot with a 4–2 win over BC in the semifinal and, after a narrow victory over New Hampshire, the tournament concluded with the Terriers taking down Harvard 4–1 for their seventh title.

After running their win streak to 11 games the third meeting with Boston College ended with a loss and the worst defensive performance all season. The loss was even more damaging for BU since it meant that Cornell, who had lost three conference games since the earlier meeting of the two teams, was now in a virtual tie with the Terriers for the top spot in the ECAC tournament. After winning at home against Providence BU ended their season with a rematch against the Big Red. While Cornell still had one more game to play after the meeting, if the Terriers won the game they would guarantee themselves the ECAC championship.

The Big Red opened the scoring once more and, after BU tied the game, Cornell extended their lead to two with goals early in the second and third period. Brady played much better in the second meeting and allowed Boston University to close the gap with a power play marker mid-way through the third but Elenbaas shut the door the rest of the way and Cornell won the ECAC championship.

=== ECAC tournament ===
BU entered the tournament as the second seed and met Rensselaer in the first round. As they had the year before the Terriers easily dispatched the Engineers to advance to the semifinal round at the Boston Garden. Boston University faced Harvard for the third time and finally, after five years of trying, BU was able to return to the ECAC championship game with a 3–1 win. In their way stood only Cornell and this time the Terriers were ready. BU were the ones who started the scoring, getting a goal past Elenbaas less than 90 seconds into the contest and again with under three to play in the first. The BU defense helped Brady by limiting the Big Red to only 5 shots in the opening frame. Cornell was able to cut the lead in half late in the second period but BU reestablished their 2-goal advantage less than two minutes later. The Terriers increased their lead early in the third while Brady shut all further opportunities down and the Terriers won their first ECAC tournament championship.

=== NCAA tournament ===
BU was looking to become the first eastern team to defend its national championship but their efforts were dealt a tremendous blow just two days before the championship began when Dan Brady was felled by a knee injury. Regan, who had played only spot duty over the previous six weeks, was the Terriers' only hope of repeating and when they faced Wisconsin in the semifinal things looked bleak early. Regan allowed Wisconsin to score a soft goal early in the game but after the rude welcome the Terriers buckled down and insulated their netminder while he got skating legs under him. Once Regan recovered his form the Terriers were able to go on the offensive and score the next four goals to skate away with the win.

In the final game BU was once again pitted against Cornell but after being one of the few teams that could beat the Big Red in the past five years, BU was not afraid of the Ithaca powerhouse. Cornell got off to a good start and outshot the Terriers in the first but an ill-advised penalty from Gordon McCormick gave BU their first power play of the game and Ron Anderson capitalized. The game remained that way for over 20 minutes before BU potted their second man-advantage marker, this time from Ric Jordan. All of this was happening while Cornell continued to pepper Regan with shots but none could find the back of the net. Another Anderson goal came before the two-minute mark of the third and the game appeared to be slipping away from the Big Red. Jordan's second goal with 7 minutes left gave the Terriers a near-insurmountable lead and though they were playing for pride at this point, the Terriers still could not score a goal and Regan earned the shutout to give BU the national championship.

Tim Regan tied the record for lowest GAA in the tournament (Ken Dryden and Gerry Powers) with a 0.50 mark and was the obvious choice for Tournament MOP. Regan was joined on the All-Tournament Team by Bob Brown, Ric Jordan and John Danby. Brown, Danby and Brady were named to the AHCA All-American East Team and, while Danby and Jordan ended up on the All-ECAC Hockey Second Team, Ric Jordan made the Second Team. Brown and Brady made the first team. Bob Brown, after tying for the team lead in scoring, received the ECAC Hockey Player of the Year, the first Terrier so honored.

Jack Kelley had announced before the final that he was retiring from college hockey and his team did not fail to give him the send-off he deserved. Kelley's squad was the first (and only as of 2019) eastern team to defend it's championship and though his immediate replacement would turn out disastrously for BU, assistant coach Jack Parker would eventually assume the reins and lead the team for 40 years.

== Standings ==
1971–72 ECAC Hockey standings
	Conference							Overall					
	GP	W	L	T	Pct.	GF	GA	GP	W	L	T	GF	GA
Cornell†	20	17	3	0	.850	117	58	29	23	6	0	175	82
Harvard	21	16	4	1	.786	118	62	26	17	8	1	127	76
Boston University*	20	15	4	1	.775	88	53	31	26	4	1	155	69
Pennsylvania	21	14	7	0	.667	107	75	25	16	9	0	122	90
New Hampshire	18	12	6	0	.667	82	61	30	20	10	0	140	109
Clarkson	20	12	8	0	.600	96	74	30	20	10	0	158	102
Rensselaer	17	9	7	1	.559	64	62	27	17	9	1	123	84
Providence	17	9	8	0	.529	73	75	24	14	9	1	106	102
Dartmouth	18	9	8	1	.528	81	78	24	13	10	1	120	103
Boston College	21	10	11	0	.476	93	106	30	14	16	0	130	155
Brown	21	9	11	1	.452	70	75	23	10	12	1	78	84
St. Lawrence	18	5	12	1	.306	63	78	26	10	14	2	100	108
Yale	17	5	12	0	.294	70	105	24	10	14	0	108	128
Colgate	19	5	14	0	.263	52	94	26	8	18	0	83	122
Princeton	19	5	14	0	.263	52	108	23	5	18	0	62	127
Northeastern	20	3	17	0	.150	68	118	26	6	20	0	102	145
Army	10	1	9	0	.100	29	44	25	11	14	0	99	88
Championship: Boston University † indicates conference regular season champion * indicates conference tournament champion

== Schedule ==
Date	Opponent^{#}	Rank^{#}	Site	Result	Record
Regular Season
November 27	vs. Yale		Walter Brown Arena • Boston, Massachusetts	W 6–3	1–0 (1–0)
December 1	at Brown		Meehan Auditorium • Providence, Rhode Island	W 3–0	2–0 (2–0)
December 4	vs. New Hampshire		Walter Brown Arena • Boston, Massachusetts	W 2–1	3–0 (3–0)
December 8	vs. Harvard		Walter Brown Arena • Boston, Massachusetts	T 4–4 ^{OT}	3–0–1 (3–0–1)
December 11	at Princeton		Hobey Baker Memorial Rink • Princeton, New Jersey	W 6–1	4–0–1 (4–0–1)
December 13	vs. Ohio*		Walter Brown Arena • Boston, Massachusetts	W 9–1	5–0–1 (4–0–1)
ECAC Christmas Hockey Tournament
December 21	vs. Northeastern		Boston Garden • Boston, Massachusetts (ECAC Christmas Hockey Tournament)	W 4–1	6–0–1 (5–0–1)
December 22	vs. Rensselaer		Boston Garden • Boston, Massachusetts (ECAC Christmas Hockey Tournament)	W 4–0	7–0–1 (6–0–1)
Syracuse Invitational Tournament
December 29	vs. Minnesota*		Onondaga War Memorial • Syracuse, New York (Syracuse Invitational)	W 4–3 ^{2OT}	8–0–1 (6–0–1)
December 30	vs. Cornell		Onondaga War Memorial • Syracuse, New York (Syracuse Invitational)	L 2–3	8–1–1 (6–1–1)
January 4	vs. Merrimack*		Walter Brown Arena • Boston, Massachusetts	W 13–1	9–1–1 (6–1–1)
January 7	at Clarkson		Walker Arena • Potsdam, New York	L 2–6	9–2–1 (6–2–1)
January 8	at St. Lawrence		Appleton Arena • Canton, New York	W 5–3	10–2–1 (7–2–1)
January 14	vs. Boston College		Walter Brown Arena • Boston, Massachusetts	W 4–1	11–2–1 (8–2–1)
January 19	vs. Massachusetts*		Walter Brown Arena • Boston, Massachusetts	W 6–4	12–2–1 (8–2–1)
January 22	vs. Vermont*		Walter Brown Arena • Boston, Massachusetts	W 7–2	13–2–1 (8–2–1)
January 26	at Providence		Rhode Island Auditorium • Providence, Rhode Island	W 7–2	14–2–1 (9–2–1)
January 29	vs. Saint Louis*		Walter Brown Arena • Boston, Massachusetts	W 5–0	15–2–1 (9–2–1)
February 3	vs. Colgate		Walter Brown Arena • Boston, Massachusetts	W 5–3	16–2–1 (10–2–1)
Beanpot
February 7	vs. Boston College		Boston Garden • Boston, Massachusetts (Beanpot Semifinal)	W 4–2	17–2–1 (11–2–1)
February 11	at New Hampshire		Snively Arena • Boston, Massachusetts	W 6–5	18–2–1 (12–2–1)
February 14	vs. Harvard		Boston Garden • Boston, Massachusetts (Beanpot Championship)	W 4–1	19–2–1 (13–2–1)
February 18	vs. Rensselaer		Walter Brown Arena • Boston, Massachusetts	W 7–3	20–2–1 (14–2–1)
February 23	at Boston College		McHugh Forum • Chestnut Hill, Massachusetts	L 5–7	20–3–1 (14–3–1)
February 26	vs. Providence		Walter Brown Arena • Boston, Massachusetts	W 6–4	21–3–1 (15–3–1)
March 1	vs. Cornell		Walter Brown Arena • Boston, Massachusetts	L 2–3	21–4–1 (15–4–1)
ECAC Hockey tournament
March 7	vs. Rensselaer*		Walter Brown Arena • Boston, Massachusetts (ECAC Quarterfinal)	W 8–2	22–4–1 (15–4–1)
March 10	vs. Harvard*		Boston Garden • Boston, Massachusetts (ECAC Semifinal)	W 3–1	23–4–1 (15–4–1)
March 11	vs. Cornell*		Boston Garden • Boston, Massachusetts (ECAC Championship)	W 4–1	24–4–1 (15–4–1)
NCAA tournament
March 16	vs. Wisconsin*		Boston Garden • Boston, Massachusetts (National Semifinal)	W 4–1	25–4–1 (15–4–1)
March 18	vs. Cornell*		Boston Garden • Boston, Massachusetts (National Championship)	W 4–0	26–4–1 (15–4–1)
*Non-conference game. ^{#}Rankings from USCHO.com Poll. Source:

== Roster and scoring statistics ==
No.	Name	Year	Position	Hometown	S/P/C	Games	Goals	Assists	Pts	PIM
12	John Danby	Senior	C	Port Credit, ON	(Ontario)	26	26	24	50	14
2	Bob Brown	Junior	D	Scarborough, ON	(Ontario)	31	14	36	50	36
19	Ron Anderson	Junior	W	Moncton, NB	(New Brunswick)	31	19	27	46	26
17	Bob Gryp	Senior	W	Merlin, ON	(Ontario)	31	9	36	45	14
7	Ric Jordan	Junior	D	Mississauga, ON	(Ontario)	31	13	27	40	34
21	Don Cahoon	Senior	W	Marblehead, MA	(Massachusetts)	31	13	17	30	14
16	Guy Burrowes	Junior	W	Niagara Falls, ON	(Ontario)	31	12	16	28	18
18	Steve Dolloff	Junior	C	Melrose, MA	(Massachusetts)	31	9	19	28	26
11	Dave Wisener	Junior	C	Pictou, NS	(Nova Scotia)	31	10	10	20	34
25	Peter Thornton	Junior	W	Scarborough, ON	(Ontario)	31	8	11	19	31
8	Paul Giandomenico	Senior	W	Walpole, MA	(Massachusetts)	31	9	7	16	10
10	Ray Cornoyea	Junior	W	Chippawa, ON	(Ontario)	22	4	8	12	4
20	Bob Murray	Senior	D	Quincy, MA	(Massachusetts)	29	1	11	12	36
27	Mike LaGarde	Senior	D	Roxboro, PQ	(Quebec)	31	4	7	11	20
5	Bill Flynn	Junior	W	Stoneham, MA	(Massachusetts)	23	2	7	9	4
23	Larry Abbott	Junior	D	Melrose, MA	(Massachusetts)	16	1	1	2	0
24	Dave Warner	Junior	D	Niagara Falls, ON	(Ontario)	28	0	2	2	4
10	Jim Connors	Sophomore	W	Chippawa, ON	(Ontario)	6	1	0	1	0
4	Ray Fowle	Sophomore	D	Niagara Falls, ON	(Ontario)	1	0	0	0	2
3	Dick Brugman	Sophomore	C	Winthrop, MA	(Massachusetts)	0	-	-	-	-
15	Allan Judge	Sophomore	C	Niagara Falls, ON	(Ontario)	0	-	-	-	-
-	Cliff Hamilton	Sophomore	C	Winchester, MA	(Massachusetts)	0	-	-	-	-
30	Joe Robillard	Sophomore	G	Woburn, MA	(Massachusetts)	2	0	0	0	0
1	Ed Walsh	Sophomore	G	Arlington, MA	(Massachusetts)	3	0	0	0	0
1	Tim Regan	Senior	G	Providence, RI	(Rhode Island)	9	0	0	0	0
30	Dan Brady	Senior	G	Canton, NY	(New York (state))	27	0	0	0	0
Total										

== Goaltending statistics ==
No.	Name	Games	Minutes	Wins	Losses	Ties	Goals Against	Saves	Shut Outs	SV %	GAA
30	Joe Robillard	2	55				0	18	0	1.000	0.00
1	Tim Regan	9	370				13	136		.913	2.11
30	Dan Brady	27	1430				53	506		.905	2.22
1	Ed Walsh	3	75				3	29	0	.906	2.40
Total		31		26	4	1	69		4		

== 1972 championship game ==
=== (E1) Boston University vs. (E2) Cornell ===
March 18	Boston University	4 – 0	Cornell	Boston Garden

Scoring summary
Period	Team	Goal	Assist(s)	Time	Score
1st	BU	Ron Anderson - GW PP	Brown and Jordan	10:42	1–0 BU
2nd	BU	Ric Jordan - PP	Brown	30:51	2–0 BU
3rd	BU	Ron Anderson	Cahoon	41:39	3–0 BU
3rd	BU	Ric Jordan	Cahoon and Anderson	53:13	4–0 BU
Penalty summary
Period	Team	Player	Penalty	Time	PIM
1st	COR	Gordon McCormick		8:52	2:00
1st	BU	Mike LaGarde		18:13	2:00
1st	COR	Larry Fullan		18:13	2:00
2nd	COR	Dave Elenbaas		29:13	2:00
2nd	BU	Ron Anderson		29:44	2:00
2nd	COR	Larry Fullan		29:44	2:00
3rd	BU	Peter Thornton		43:24	2:00

Shots by period
Team	1	2	3	T
Cornell	14	12	13	39
Boston University	8	11	13	32

Goaltenders
Team	Name	Saves	Goals against	Time on ice
COR	Dave Elenbaas	28	4	60:00
BU	Tim Regan	39	0	60:00
