= 1972 NCAA University Division men's ice hockey tournament =

College ice hockey tournament

- Teams: 4
- Finals site: Boston Garden, Boston, Massachusetts
- Champions: Boston University Terriers (2nd title)
- Runner-up: Cornell Big Red (4th title game)
- Semifinalists: Wisconsin Badgers (2nd Frozen Four); Denver Pioneers (10th Frozen Four)
- Winning coach: Jack Kelley (2nd title)
- MOP: Tim Regan (Boston University)
- Attendance: 30,566

The 1972 NCAA Men's University Division Ice Hockey Tournament was the culmination of the 1971–72 NCAA University Division men's ice hockey season, the 25th such tournament in NCAA history. It was held between March 16 and 18, 1972, and concluded with Boston University defeating Cornell 4–0. All games were played at the Boston Garden in Boston, Massachusetts.

== Qualifying teams ==
Four teams qualified for the tournament, two each from the eastern and western regions. The ECAC tournament champion and the two WCHA tournament co-champions received automatic bids into the tournament. An at-large bid was offered to a second eastern team based upon both their ECAC tournament finish as well as their regular season record.

East							West						
Seed	School	Conference	Record	Berth type	Appearance	Last bid	Seed	School	Conference	Record	Berth type	Appearance	Last bid
1	Boston University	ECAC Hockey	24–4–1	Tournament champion	8th	1971	1	Denver	WCHA	27–9–0	Tournament co-champion	10th	1971
2	Cornell	ECAC Hockey	22–5–0	At-Large	5th	1970	2	Wisconsin	WCHA	26–9–1	Tournament co-champion	2nd	1970

== Format ==
The ECAC champion was seeded as the top eastern team while the WCHA co-champion with the better regular season record was given the top western seed. The second eastern seed was slotted to play the top western seed and vice versa. All games were played at the Boston Garden. All matches were Single-game eliminations with the semifinal winners advancing to the national championship game and the losers playing in a consolation game.

== Tournament bracket ==
Semifinals; March 16–17
E1	Boston University	4
W2	Wisconsin	1
W1	Denver	2
E2	Cornell	7

National championship March 18
E1	Boston University	4
E2	Cornell	0
Third-place game
W1	Denver	2
W2	Wisconsin	5

Note: * denotes overtime period(s)

=== Semifinals ===
==== (E1) Boston University vs. (W2) Wisconsin ====
March 16	Boston University	4 – 1	Wisconsin	Boston Garden	Recap
No scoring		First period	10:38 - Brian Erickson (Folk)
(Dolloff) Paul Giandomenico - 10:56 (Anderson, Gryp) John Danby - PP GW - 17:14		Second period	No scoring
(Cahoon, Jordan) John Danby - 07:12 (unassisted) John Danby - EN - 18:48		Third period	No scoring
(28 saves / 29 shots) Tim Regan		Goalie stats	Dick Perkins (33 saves / 36 shots)

==== (W1) Denver vs. (E2) Cornell ====
March 17	Denver	2 – 7	Cornell	Boston Garden
No Scoring		First period	01:08 - Larry Fullan (Ugolini, Hanson); 07:15 - Dave Westner (Higgs); 17:51 - GW - Gord McCormick (Stewart, Dunsmuir)
(Morenz) Bob Krieger - 13:57 (Christy, Preston) Brian Morenz - 14:49		Second period	18:53 - Dave Westner (Fumio, Fullan)
No scoring		Third period	09:12 - Dave Westner (Fumio); 12:51 - Dave Westner (Fullan); 19:40 - Doug Marrett (Brush, Murray)
( 28 saves / 35 shots ) Ron Grahame		Goalie stats	Dave Elenbaas ( 32 saves / 34 shots )

=== Consolation Game ===
==== (W1) Denver vs. (W2) Wisconsin ====
March 18	Denver	2 – 5	Wisconsin	Boston Garden	Recap
No scoring		First period	01:43 - Gary Winchester (Lundsen, Johnston); 11:40 - Gary Winchester (Folk)
(unassisted) Bob Krieger - 00:56		Second period	12:25 - GW - Gary Winchester (Rotsch, Dool)
(Palmer) Pete McNab - 12:11		Third period	02:06 - Jim Young (Lundeen, Winchester); 14:57 - PP - Norm Cherrey (Bentley, Machowski)
(36 saves / 41 shots) Ron Grahame		Goalie stats	Jim Makey (30 saves / 32 shots)

=== National Championship ===
==== (E1) Boston University vs. (E2) Cornell ====
March 18	Boston University	4 – 0	Cornell	Boston Garden

Scoring summary
Period	Team	Goal	Assist(s)	Time	Score
1st	BU	Ron Anderson - GW PP	Brown and Jordan	10:42	1–0 BU
2nd	BU	Ric Jordan - PP	Brown	30:51	2–0 BU
3rd	BU	Ron Anderson	Cahoon	41:39	3–0 BU
3rd	BU	Ric Jordan	Cahoon and Anderson	53:13	4–0 BU
Penalty summary
Period	Team	Player	Penalty	Time	PIM
1st	COR	Gordon McCormick		8:52	2:00
1st	BU	Mike LaGarde		18:13	2:00
1st	COR	Larry Fullan		18:13	2:00
2nd	COR	Dave Elenbaas		29:13	2:00
2nd	BU	Ron Anderson		29:44	2:00
2nd	COR	Larry Fullan		29:44	2:00
3rd	BU	Peter Thornton		43:24	2:00

Shots by period
Team	1	2	3	T
Cornell	14	12	13	39
Boston University	8	11	13	32

Goaltenders
Team	Name	Saves	Goals against	Time on ice
COR	Dave Elenbaas	28	4	60:00
BU	Tim Regan	39	0	60:00

== All-Tournament team ==
- G: Tim Regan* (Boston University)
- D: Bob Brown (Boston University)
- D: Ric Jordan (Boston University)
- F: John Danby (Boston University)
- F: Dave Westner (Cornell)
- F: Gary Winchester (Wisconsin)

* Most Outstanding Player(s)
