= 1972 ECAC Hockey men's ice hockey tournament =

1972 ECAC Men's ice hockey tournament
- Dates: March 7–11, 1972
- Teams: 8
- Finals site: Boston Garden; Boston, Massachusetts
- Champions: Boston University (1st title)
- Winning coach: Jack Kelley (1st title)
- MVP: John Danby (Boston University)
- ECAC Men's Ice Hockey Tournaments

The 1972 ECAC Hockey Men's Ice Hockey Tournament was the 11th tournament in league history. It was played between March 7 and March 11, 1972. Quarterfinal games were played at home team campus sites, while the 'final four' games were played at the Boston Garden in Boston, Massachusetts. By reaching the championship game both, Boston University and Cornell received invitations to participate in the 1972 NCAA Division I Men's Ice Hockey Tournament.

== Format ==
The tournament featured three rounds of play, all of which were single-elimination. The top eight teams, based on winning percentage, qualified to participate in the tournament. In the quarterfinals the first seed and eighth seed, the second seed and seventh seed, the third seed and sixth seed and the fourth seed and fifth seed played against one another. In the semifinals, the highest seed plays the lowest remaining seed while the two remaining teams play with the winners advancing to the championship game and the losers advancing to the third place game.

== Conference standings ==
Note: GP = Games played; W = Wins; L = Losses; T = Ties; Pct. = Winning percentage; GF = Goals for; GA = Goals against

1971–72 ECAC Hockey standings
	Conference							Overall					
	GP	W	L	T	Pct.	GF	GA	GP	W	L	T	GF	GA
Cornell†	20	17	3	0	.850	117	58	29	23	6	0	175	82
Harvard	21	16	4	1	.786	118	62	26	17	8	1	127	76
Boston University*	20	15	4	1	.775	88	53	31	26	4	1	155	69
Pennsylvania	21	14	7	0	.667	107	75	25	16	9	0	122	90
New Hampshire	18	12	6	0	.667	82	61	30	20	10	0	140	109
Clarkson	20	12	8	0	.600	96	74	30	20	10	0	158	102
Rensselaer	17	9	7	1	.559	64	62	27	17	9	1	123	84
Providence	17	9	8	0	.529	73	75	24	14	9	1	106	102
Dartmouth	18	9	8	1	.528	81	78	24	13	10	1	120	103
Boston College	21	10	11	0	.476	93	106	30	14	16	0	130	155
Brown	21	9	11	1	.452	70	75	23	10	12	1	78	84
St. Lawrence	18	5	12	1	.306	63	78	26	10	14	2	100	108
Yale	17	5	12	0	.294	70	105	24	10	14	0	108	128
Colgate	19	5	14	0	.263	52	94	26	8	18	0	83	122
Princeton	19	5	14	0	.263	52	108	23	5	18	0	62	127
Northeastern	20	3	17	0	.150	68	118	26	6	20	0	102	145
Army	10	1	9	0	.100	29	44	25	11	14	0	99	88
Championship: Boston University † indicates conference regular season champion * indicates conference tournament champion

== Bracket ==
Teams are reseeded after the first round

Quarterfinals; March 7
1	Cornell	11
8	Providence	1
2	Boston University	8
7	Rensselaer	2
3	Harvard	6*
6	Clarkson	5
4	Pennsylvania	3
5	New Hampshire	5

Semifinals; March 10
1	Cornell	6
5	New Hampshire	3
2	Boston University	3
3	Harvard	1

Championship; March 11
1	Cornell	1
2	Boston University	4
Third Place
3	Harvard	1
5	New Hampshire	4

Note: * denotes overtime period(s)

=== Quarterfinals ===
==== (1) Cornell vs. (8) Providence ====
March 7	Cornell	11 – 1	Providence	Lynah Rink

==== (2) Boston University vs. (7) Rensselaer ====
March 7	Boston University	8 – 2	Rensselaer	Walter Brown Arena

==== (3) Harvard vs. (6) Clarkson ====
March 7	Harvard	6 – 5	OT	Clarkson	Donald C. Watson Rink

==== (4) Pennsylvania vs. (5) New Hampshire ====
March 7	Pennsylvania	3 – 5	New Hampshire	Class of 1923 Arena

=== Semifinals ===
==== (1) Cornell vs. (5) New Hampshire ====
March 10	Cornell	6 – 3	New Hampshire	Boston Garden

==== (2) Boston University vs. (3) Harvard ====
March 10	Boston University	3 – 1	Harvard	Boston Garden

=== Third Place ===
==== (3) Harvard vs. (5) New Hampshire ====
March 11	Harvard	1 – 4	New Hampshire	Boston Garden

=== Championship ===
==== (1) Cornell vs. (2) Boston University ====
March 11	Cornell	1 – 4	Boston University	Boston Garden

== Tournament awards ==
=== All-Tournament Team ===
==== First Team ====
- F Dave Wisener (Boston University)
- F Don Cahoon (Boston University)
- F Larry Fullan (Cornell)
- F John Danby* (Boston University)
- D Jim Higgs (Cornell)
- D Bob Brown (Boston University)
- G Dan Brady (Boston University)

* Most Outstanding Player(s)

==== Second Team ====
- F Bill Hanson (Cornell)
- F Guy Smith (New Hampshire)
- F Carlo Ugolini (Cornell)
- D Mark Noonan (Harvard)
- D Ric Jordan (Boston University)
- G Bob Smith (New Hampshire)
