= Danby =

Danby may refer to:

== Places ==
- Danby, California
- Danby, Missouri
- Danby, New York, a town
  - Danby (CDP), New York
- Danby, North Yorkshire
- Danby, Vermont, a New England town
- Danby (CDP), Vermont, village in the towns of Danby and Mount Tabor
- Danby Township, Michigan
- Danby Wiske, North Yorkshire village

== Other uses ==
- Danby (surname)
- 3415 Danby, asteroid
- First Danby ministry, an administration in 17th century England
- Earl of Danby, a subsidiary title of the Duke of Leeds
- Thomas Osborne, 1st Duke of Leeds
- Julia Frankau, novelist under the name of Frank Danby
- Leeds Thomas Danby, college in West Yorkshire
- Danby railway station in North Yorkshire
- Danby (appliances)
