= Smaby =

Smaby is a surname. Notable people with the surname include:

- Alpha Sunde Smaby (1910–1991), American politician and teacher
- Matt Smaby (born 1984), American ice hockey player

== See also ==
- Maby
