= John Danby =

John Danby may refer to:

- John Danby (footballer) (born 1983), professional footballer
- John Danby (ice hockey) (born 1948), Canadian former major league ice hockey player
- John Danby (musician) (1757–1798), English composer

== See also ==
- Danby (disambiguation)
