= Daby =

Surname list

Daby is a surname. Notable people with the surname include:

- Ajay Daby, Mauritian barrister and speaker
- Janet Daby (born 1970), British politician

== See also ==
- Daby Island, California island
- Danby (surname)
- Maby
