= Jim Estill =

Canadian technology entrepreneur

Jim Estill CM OOnt
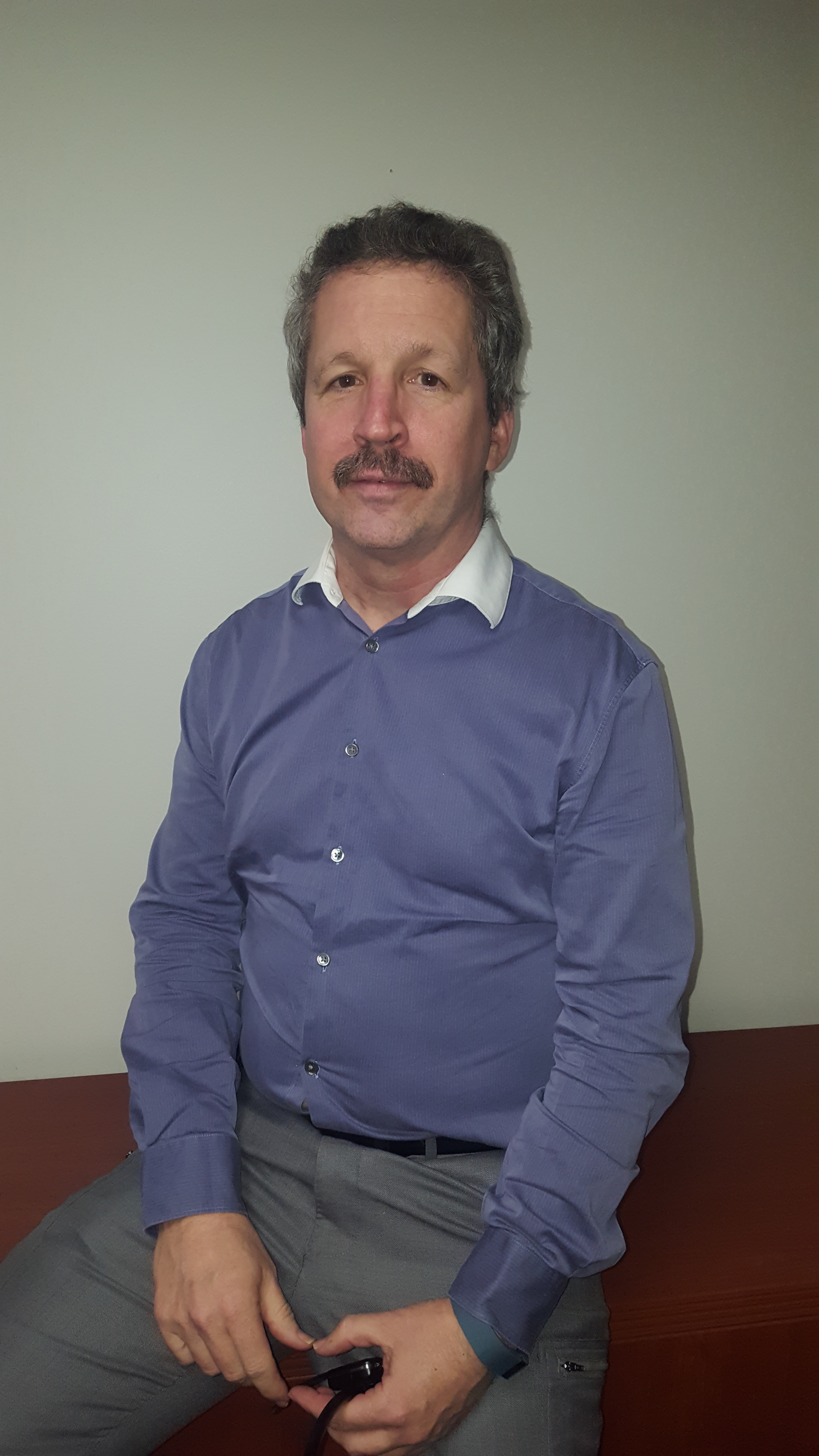
- Born: April 8, 1957 (age 69)
- Education: University of Waterloo
- Occupation: CEO of Danby Appliances Inc. (2015–present)
- Website: Official website

James Andrew Estill (born April 8, 1957) is a Canadian technology entrepreneur, executive, and philanthropist who has been CEO of appliance manufacturer Danby Appliances Ltd since 2015. During the course of his career, Estill has invested in 150 start-up companies and received international attention for sponsoring the resettling of Syrian refugee families in Canada. In recognition of his philanthropic efforts, Estill received the Order of Ontario in June 2017 and was named to the Order of Canada in July 2018, and received a King Charles III Coronation Medal in 2024.

== Education ==
Estill studied engineering at the University of Waterloo, graduating in 1980 with a Bachelor of Science degree in Systems Design Engineering.

== Business career ==
=== 1980–1999 ===
In his final year of university, he started his first company, EMJ Data Systems. Estill sold computer equipment and software, soon transitioning into distribution.

In 1996, Estill joined the Young Presidents' Organization (YPO) and remains a member of the CNBC-YPO Chief Executive Network.

Estill was a founding board member of Research in Motion/BlackBerry in 1997, before the company went public.

=== 2000–2009 ===
In 2003, EMJ purchased the Canadian operations of DaisyTek Canada, doubling their distribution size to more than $350 million in consolidated revenue.

In June 2004, Synnex Canada purchased EMJ Data Systems for $56 million. As part of the deal, Estill took over as CEO of Synnex's Canadian division. During the five years that he ran Synnex from 2004 to 2009.

=== 2010–present ===
In 2010, Estill left BlackBerry Limited and published his first book, Time Leadership – Lessons from a CEO and followed that publication three years later with Zero to $2 Billion: The Marketing and Branding Story Behind the Growth. Estill also is on the advisory board of OMERS Ventures, one of Canada's largest pension funds, which began operations in 2011.

Estill came out of semi-retirement to assume the post of CEO at Guelph, Ontario-based Danby Products in 2015. In 2017, Estill purchased Danby Products and its subsidiaries from John Wood and his family. Under his guidance, the company resumed manufacturing some of its products in Canada for the first time in a number of years.

In 2023, Estill purchased Valcom Manufacturing Group, a company that designs and manufactures of a full range of antennas.

In 2024, Estill purchased Arctic Snowplows, a Canadian company that manufactures snow plows.

=== Seed investor ===
In addition to the businesses he started on his own, Estill was a seed investor for over 150 companies, including well.ca, Printeron, Miovision, Clearpath Robotics, Postrank, Touch Bistro, Spicer, Inex, and Border Networks. Jim has also been granted patents for a variety of inventions, predominantly in the appliance arena.

== Philanthropy ==
In November 2015, Estill sponsored the immigration of 50 Syrian families to Guelph, Ontario. Estill has now sponsored more than 200 people.

In addition to his own project, Estill also contributed his finances to help a nine-year-old local boy realize his family's dream of sponsoring a Syrian family in Canada.

In recognition of his philanthropic efforts, Estill received the Order of Ontario in June 2017 and was named to the Order of Canada in June 2018. Together with all other living member of the Order of Canada, he automatically received the King Charles III Coronation Medal in 2024.
