= Danby (surname) =

Danby is a surname. Notable people with the surname include:

- Abstrupus Danby (1655–1727), English wool merchant
- Christopher Danby (1503–1571), English politician and landowner
- Francis Danby (1793–1861), Irish painter
- Gordon Danby, American physicist
- Graeme Danby (born 1962), English operatic bass
- Herbert Danby (1889–1953), English priest and writer
- James Francis Danby (1816–1875), English landscape painter
- John Danby (disambiguation), multiple people
- Ken Danby (1940–2007), Canadian artist
- Michael Danby (born 1955), Australian politician
- Nicholas Danby (1935–1997) English organist, composer and teacher
- Noah Danby (born 1974), Canadian actor
- Robert Danby (died 1474), British justice
- Thomas Danby (disambiguation), multiple people
- Tom Danby (1926–2022), English rugby player
- William Danby (writer) (1752–1833), English writer
- William Danby (coroner)
