= Guy Smith (ice hockey, born 1950) =

Canadian ice hockey player

- Born: January 2, 1950 (age 76) Ottawa, Ontario, Canada
- Height: 6 ft 2 in (188 cm)
- Weight: 190 lb (86 kg; 13 st 8 lb)
- Position: Left wing
- Shot: Left
- Played for: New England Whalers (WHA)
- WHA draft: WHA Player selection, 1972; New England Whalers
- Playing career: 1972–1977

Guy Smith (born January 2, 1950) is a Canadian former professional ice hockey player.

== Early life ==
Smith was born in Ottawa. He played minor ice hockey in Brantford, Ontario, and participated in the 1962 Quebec International Pee-Wee Hockey Tournament with the Six Nations of the Grand River youth team.

== Career ==
Smith attended the University of New Hampshire, where he played four seasons of NCAA Division I ice hockey as a standout player with the New Hampshire Wildcats men's ice hockey team. During the 1972–73 and 1973–74 WHA seasons, Smith played 38 regular season and 11 playoff games with the New England Whalers of the World Hockey Association.

The Guy Smith Award is presented annually to the team's best offensive player.

== Career statistics ==
=== Regular season and playoffs ===
| | | | Regular season | | | | | Playoffs |
| Season | Team | League | GP | G | A | Pts | PIM | GP | G | A | Pts | PIM |
|---|---|---|---|---|---|---|---|---|---|---|---|---|
| 1967–68 | Ottawa 67's | OHA | 35 | 3 | 4 | 7 | 30 | –– | –– | –– | –– | –– |
| 1969–70 | University of New Hampshire | ECAC | 31 | 14 | 30 | 44 | 46 | –– | –– | –– | –– | –– |
| 1970–71 | University of New Hampshire | ECAC | 28 | 11 | 36 | 47 | 118 | –– | –– | –– | –– | –– |
| 1971–72 | University of New Hampshire | ECAC | 29 | 21 | 41 | 62 | 75 | –– | –– | –– | –– | –– |
| 1972–73 | New England Blades | EHL | 10 | 5 | 11 | 16 | 26 | –– | –– | –– | –– | –– |
| 1972–73 | Rhode Island Eagles | EHL | 42 | 13 | 36 | 49 | 27 | –– | –– | –– | –– | –– |
| 1972–73 | New England Whalers | WHA | 22 | 3 | 3 | 6 | 6 | 11 | 2 | 0 | 2 | 4 |
| 1973–74 | Jacksonville Barons | AHL | 24 | 5 | 6 | 11 | 10 | –– | –– | –– | –– | –– |
| 1973–74 | New England Whalers | WHA | 16 | 1 | 5 | 6 | 25 | –– | –– | –– | –– | –– |
| 1974–75 | Brantford Foresters | OHASr | 5 | 2 | 1 | 3 | 11 | –– | –– | –– | –– | –– |
| 1976–77 | Brantford Alexanders | OHASr | 29 | 14 | 23 | 37 | 53 | –– | –– | –– | –– | –– |
| WHA totals | | | 38 | 4 | 8 | 12 | 31 | 11 | 2 | 0 | 2 | 4 |

== Awards and honours ==
| Award | Year |
|---|---|
| All-ECAC Hockey First Team | 1971–72 |
| ECAC Hockey All-Tournament Second Team | 1972 |
