= Jim Watt (ice hockey) =

American ice hockey player

- Born: May 11, 1950 (age 76) Duluth, Minnesota, U.S.
- Height: 5 ft 11 in (180 cm)
- Weight: 180 lb (82 kg; 12 st 12 lb)
- Position: Goaltender
- Caught: Left
- Played for: St. Louis Blues
- National team: United States
- Playing career: 1972–1977

James Magnus Watt (born May 11, 1950) is an American retired professional ice hockey goaltender. He played one game in the National Hockey League, with the St. Louis Blues during the 1973–74 season. The rest of his career, which lasted from 1972 to 1977, was spent in the minor leagues

== Early life ==
Watt was born in Duluth, Minnesota. He was a member of the Michigan State University team before turning professional.

== Career ==
Watt played one game in the National Hockey League with the St. Louis Blues, on March 21, 1974 against the Boston Bruins, but spent most of his time in the minor leagues. Watt also played for the American national team at the 1972 World Championships in the B Pool.

== Career statistics ==
=== Regular season and playoffs ===
			Regular season									Playoffs
Season	Team	League	GP	W	L	T	MIN	GA	SO	GAA	SV%	GP	W	L	MIN	GA	SO	GAA	SV%
1969–70	Michigan State University	WCHA	1	0	0	0	42	4	0	5.70	.789	—	—	—	—	—	—	—	—
1970–71	Michigan State University	WCHA	25	—	—	—	1480	101	0	4.09	.884	—	—	—	—	—	—	—	—
1971–72	Michigan State University	WCHA	36	20	16	0	2160	128	0	3.56	.897	—	—	—	—	—	—	—	—
1972–73	Denver Spurs	WHL	15	4	8	0	791	53	0	4.02	.885	—	—	—	—	—	—	—	—
1972–73	Fort Worth Wings	CHL	7	—	—	—	335	26	0	4.65	—	—	—	—	—	—	—	—	—
1973–74	St. Louis Blues	NHL	1	0	0	0	20	2	0	6.00	.800	—	—	—	—	—	—	—	—
1973–74	Denver Spurs	WHL	31	14	15	0	1827	112	0	3.68	.886	—	—	—	—	—	—	—	—
1974–75	Denver Spurs	CHL	30	10	10	9	1738	100	0	3.45	—	—	—	—	—	—	—	—	—
1975–76	Tidewater Sharks	SHL	55	19	23	11	3147	172	1	3.28	.901	—	—	—	—	—	—	—	—
1975–76	Kalamazoo Wings	IHL	8	—	—	—	420	25	0	3.57	—	6	2	4	381	18	1	2.83	—
1976–77	Winston-Salem Polar Twins	SHL	3	—	—	—	149	16	0	6.44	.838	—	—	—	—	—	—	—	—
NHL totals			1	0	0	0	20	2	0	6.00	.800	—	—	—	—	—	—	—	—

== Awards and honors ==
Award	Year
All-WCHA First Team	1971–72
AHCA West All-American	1971–72

== See also ==
- List of players who played only one game in the NHL
