= Isle du Bois Creek (Missouri) =

Stream in the US state of Missouri

Isle du Bois Creek is a stream in Jefferson and Ste. Genevieve counties of the U.S. state of Missouri. It is a tributary of the Mississippi River.

The stream headwaters arise at 38°05′24″N 90°20′27″W in southern Jefferson County and it flows to the east-northeast for approximately one-half mile. At this point it becomes the boundary between the two counties and meanders to the east and northeast. The stream passes under I-55 and US Route 61 approximately 1.5 miles south of the community of Danby. The stream continues on to the east-northeast to its confluence with the Mississippi at the south end of Rush Island at 38°06′01″N 90°13′56″W.

Isle du Bois is a name derived from the French denoting "isle of the woods".

== See also ==
- List of rivers of Missouri
