= 1971–72 NCAA University Division men's ice hockey season =

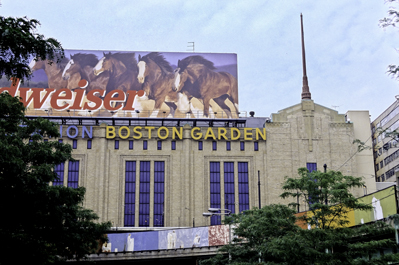
- The Boston Garden served as the host for the 1972 Tournament
- Duration: November 1971– March 18, 1972
- NCAA tournament: 1972
- National championship: Boston Garden; Boston, Massachusetts
- NCAA champion: Boston University

The 1971–72 NCAA University Division men's ice hockey season began in November 1971 and concluded with the 1972 NCAA University Division Men's Ice Hockey Tournament's championship game on March 18, 1972 at the Boston Garden in Boston, Massachusetts. This was the 25th season in which an NCAA ice hockey championship was held and is the 78th year overall where an NCAA school fielded a team.

This was the first year of play for the CCHA with former independents Ohio State and Saint Louis being joined by new programs from Bowling Green and Ohio.

Notre Dame joined the WCHA.

For the final time the ICAC awarded a trophy to the league champion.

== Season Outlook ==
=== Pre-season conference polls ===
Conference pre-season polls as voted on by coaches.

ECAC Poll
Rank	Team
1	Boston University
2	Cornell
3	Clarkson
4	Harvard
5	Brown
6	Pennsylvania
7	New Hampshire
8	Rensselaer
9	St. Lawrence
10	Providence
11	Northeastern
12	Boston College
13	Yale
14	Dartmouth
15	Colgate
16	Army
17	Princeton

CCHA Poll
Rank	Team
1	Bowling Green
2	Saint Louis
3	Ohio State
4	Ohio

WCHA Poll
Rank	Team
1	Michigan Tech
2	Denver
3	Michigan State
4	Wisconsin
5	Notre Dame
6	Minnesota Duluth
7	North Dakota
8	Minnesota
9	Michigan
10	Colorado College

== Regular season ==
=== Season tournaments ===
Tournament	Dates	Teams	Champion
Christmas City of the North Tournament	November 25–27	4	Lake Superior State
North Country Thanksgiving Festival	November 25–27	4	St. Lawrence
Cleveland Cup Invitational	December 20–21	4	Bowling Green
ECAC Holiday Hockey Festival	December 20–21	4	Notre Dame
ECAC Christmas Hockey Tournament	December 21–22	4	Boston University
Flint IMA Tournament	December 28–29	4	Michigan
Great Lakes Invitational	December 28–29	4	Michigan Tech
Rensselaer Holiday Tournament	December 28–30	4	Clarkson
Syracuse Invitational	December 29–30	4	Cornell
Bowdoin Invitational	January 1–2	4	
Beanpot	February 7, 14	4	Boston University

=== Standings ===
1971–72 Big Ten standings
	Conference							Overall					
	GP	W	L	T	PTS	GF	GA	GP	W	L	T	GF	GA
Wisconsin†	10	6	4	0	12	48	29	38	27	10	1	170	106
Michigan	10	5	5	0	10	34	44	34	16	18	0	132	186
Michigan State	10	5	5	0	10	39	44	36	20	16	0	154	129
Minnesota	10	4	6	0	8	31	42	32	8	24	0	97	157
† indicates conference regular season champion

1971–72 Central Collegiate Hockey Association standings
	Conference							Overall					
	GP	W	L	T	PTS	GF	GA	GP	W	L	T	GF	GA
Ohio State†*	12	8	4	0	16	44	35	29	24	5	0	154	71
Saint Louis	12	7	3	2	16	64	49	33	15	15	3	194	156
Bowling Green	12	6	4	2	14	60	48	33	21	10	2	172	123
Ohio	12	1	11	0	2	34	70	24	7	17	0	97	132
Championship: Ohio State † indicates conference regular season champion * indicates conference tournament champion

1971–72 ECAC Hockey standings
	Conference							Overall					
	GP	W	L	T	Pct.	GF	GA	GP	W	L	T	GF	GA
Cornell†	20	17	3	0	.850	117	58	29	23	6	0	175	82
Harvard	21	16	4	1	.786	118	62	26	17	8	1	127	76
Boston University*	20	15	4	1	.775	88	53	31	26	4	1	155	69
Pennsylvania	21	14	7	0	.667	107	75	25	16	9	0	122	90
New Hampshire	18	12	6	0	.667	82	61	30	20	10	0	140	109
Clarkson	20	12	8	0	.600	96	74	30	20	10	0	158	102
Rensselaer	17	9	7	1	.559	64	62	27	17	9	1	123	84
Providence	17	9	8	0	.529	73	75	24	14	9	1	106	102
Dartmouth	18	9	8	1	.528	81	78	24	13	10	1	120	103
Boston College	21	10	11	0	.476	93	106	30	14	16	0	130	155
Brown	21	9	11	1	.452	70	75	23	10	12	1	78	84
St. Lawrence	18	5	12	1	.306	63	78	26	10	14	2	100	108
Yale	17	5	12	0	.294	70	105	24	10	14	0	108	128
Colgate	19	5	14	0	.263	52	94	26	8	18	0	83	122
Princeton	19	5	14	0	.263	52	108	23	5	18	0	62	127
Northeastern	20	3	17	0	.150	68	118	26	6	20	0	102	145
Army	10	1	9	0	.100	29	44	25	11	14	0	99	88
Championship: Boston University † indicates conference regular season champion * indicates conference tournament champion

1971–72 Independent College Athletic Conference standings
	Conference							Overall					
	GP	W	L	T	PTS	GF	GA	GP	W	L	T	GF	GA
Rensselaer†	4	2	1	1	5	16	15	27	17	9	1	123	84
Clarkson	4	2	2	0	4	17	15	30	20	10	0	158	102
St. Lawrence	4	1	2	1	3	13	16	26	10	14	2	100	108
† indicates conference regular season champion

1971–72 NCAA University Division Independent ice hockey standings
	Conference							Overall					
	GP	W	L	T	PTS	GF	GA	GP	W	L	T	GF	GA
Air Force	0	0	0	0	-	-	-	31	25	6	0	226	119
Alaska–Fairbanks	0	0	0	0	-	-	-	11	6	5	0	-	-

1971–72 Western Collegiate Hockey Association standings
	Conference							Overall					
	GP	W	L	T	PTS	GF	GA	GP	W	L	T	GF	GA
Denver†*	28	19	9	0	54	148	104	38	27	11	0	205	137
Wisconsin*	28	20	8	0	48	134	87	38	27	10	1	170	106
North Dakota	28	18	10	0	44	130	109	36	21	14	1	161	138
Michigan State	28	15	13	0	42	119	103	36	20	16	0	154	129
Minnesota-Duluth	28	15	13	0	40	129	123	35	16	18	1	148	150
Michigan	28	12	16	0	32	108	163	34	16	18	0	132	186
Michigan Tech	26	11	15	0	30	120	124	34	16	17	1	152	148
Notre Dame	26	10	16	0	28	120	121	34	14	20	0	164	160
Colorado College	28	11	17	0	28	140	165	32	13	19	0	170	184
Minnesota	28	7	21	0	14	83	132	32	8	24	0	97	157
Championship: Wisconsin, Denver † indicates conference regular season champion * indicates conference tournament champion

== 1972 NCAA Tournament ==
Semifinals; March 16–17
E1	Boston University	4
W2	Wisconsin	1
W1	Denver	2
E2	Cornell	7

National championship March 18
E1	Boston University	4
E2	Cornell	0
Third-place game
W1	Denver	2
W2	Wisconsin	5

Note: * denotes overtime period(s)

== Player stats ==
=== Scoring leaders ===
The following players led the league in points at the conclusion of the season.

GP = Games played; G = Goals; A = Assists; Pts = Points; PIM = Penalty minutes

Player	Class	Team	GP	G	A	Pts	PIM
Dave Skalko	Junior	Air Force	31	27	49	76	33
Doug Palazzari	Sophomore	Colorado College	32	32	40	72	42
Bob Ross	Senior	Air Force	31	39	31	70	8
Tom Peluso	Sophomore	Denver	37	32	37	69	73
Mike Bartley	Sophomore	Bowling Green	33	37	31	68	-
Don Thompson	Junior	Michigan State	35	32	35	67	66
Peter McNab	Sophomore	Denver	38	27	38	65	16
Larry Fullan	Senior	Cornell	29	20	43	63	28
John Gray	Senior	New Hampshire	30	29	33	63	44
Guy Smith	Senior	New Hampshire	29	21	41	62	75

=== Leading goaltenders ===
The following goaltenders led the league in goals against average at the end of the regular season while playing at least 33% of their team's total minutes.

GP = Games played; Min = Minutes played; W = Wins; L = Losses; OT = Overtime/shootout losses; GA = Goals against; SO = Shutouts; SV% = Save percentage; GAA = Goals against average

Player	Class	Team	GP	Min	W	L	OT	GA	SO	SV%	GAA
Dick Perkins	Freshman	Wisconsin	13	719	8	2	1	23	1	.940	1.92
Dan Brady	Senior	Boston University	27	-	-	-	-	-	-	-	2.22
Bill McKenzie	Senior	Ohio State	22	1280	19	-	-	48	4	-	2.25
Dave Elenbaas	Sophomore	Cornell	28	-	-	-	-	-	-	.902	2.79
Jim Makey	Sophomore	Wisconsin	28	1578	22	6	0	81	0	.900	3.08
Terry Miskolczi	Junior	Bowling Green	15	-	-	-	-	-	-	-	3.22
Lou Reycroft	Senior	Brown	-	1142	-	-	-	63	0	.888	3.31
Kevin Woods	Junior	Clarkson	17	980	11	-	-	54	0	.887	3.33
Eric Gorzelnik	Junior	Army	25	1496	11	14	0	85	1	.904	3.41
Don Cutts	Sophomore	Rensselaer	21	1260	-	-	-	72	1	.898	3.43

== Awards ==
=== NCAA ===
Award		Recipient
Spencer Penrose Award		John "Snooks" Kelley, Boston College
Most Outstanding Player in NCAA Tournament		Tim Regan, Boston University
AHCA All-American Teams
East Team	Position	West Team
Dan Brady, Boston University	G	Jim Watt, Michigan State
Bob Brown, Boston University	D	Jeff Rotsch, Wisconsin
Steve Warr, Clarkson	D	Alan Hangsleben, North Dakota
John Danby, Boston University	F	Bob Winograd, Colorado College
Larry Fullan, Cornell	F	Walt Ledingham, Minnesota-Duluth
Dave Hynes, Harvard	F	Doug Palazzari, Colorado College
	F	Tom Peluso, Denver

=== ECAC ===
Award		Recipient
Player of the Year		Bob Brown, Boston University
Rookie of the Year		Don Cutts, Rensselaer
Most Outstanding Player in Tournament		John Danby, Boston University
All-ECAC Hockey Teams
First Team	Position	Second Team
Dan Brady, Boston University	G	Don Cutts, Rensselaer
Bob Brown, Boston University	D	Ric Jordan, Boston University
Steve Warr, Clarkson	D	Jim Higgs, Cornell
Gordie Clark, New Hampshire	F	John Danby, Boston University
Larry Fullan, Cornell	F	Dave Hynes, Harvard
Guy Smith, New Hampshire	F	Bob McManama, Harvard

=== WCHA ===
Award		Recipient
Most Valuable Player		Doug Palazzari, Colorado College
Freshman of the Year		Alan Hangsleben, North Dakota
Coach of the Year		Jeff Sauer, Colorado College
All-WCHA Teams
First Team	Position	Second Team
Jim Watt, Michigan State	G	Jim Makey, Wisconsin
Alan Hangsleben, North Dakota	D	Bob Boyd, Michigan State
Bob Winograd, Colorado College	D	Rick Wilson, North Dakota
Jim Cahoon, North Dakota	F	Walt Ledingham, Minnesota-Duluth
Doug Palazzari, Colorado College	F	Bernie Gagnon, Michigan
Tom Peluso, Denver	F	Don Thompson, Michigan State

== 1972 NHL Amateur Draft ==
Round	Pick	Player	College	Conference	NHL team
3	42	Bob Krieger	Denver	WCHA	Detroit Red Wings
4	61	Tom Peluso	Denver	WCHA	Chicago Black Hawks
4	62	Dave Elenbaas	Cornell	ECAC Hockey	Montreal Canadiens
5	66	Bill Nyrop	Notre Dame	WCHA	Montreal Canadiens
5	74	Dennis Johnson	North Dakota	WCHA	Detroit Red Wings
6	84	Mike Usitalo	Michigan Tech	WCHA	Los Angeles Kings
6	85	Peter McNab	Denver	WCHA	Buffalo Sabres
6	93	Rob Palmer	Denver	WCHA	Chicago Black Hawks
6	94	D'Arcy Ryan	Yale	ECAC Hockey	Montreal Canadiens
7	104	D’Arcy Keating	Notre Dame	WCHA	Pittsburgh Penguins
7	107	Monte Miron	Clarkson	ECAC Hockey	Toronto Maple Leafs
7	112	Gordie Clark	New Hampshire	ECAC Hockey	Boston Bruins
8	121	Gary Winchester	Wisconsin	WCHA	St. Louis Blues
8	124	Bob Lundeen	Wisconsin	WCHA	Minnesota North Stars
8	125	Billy Reay	Wisconsin	WCHA	Chicago Black Hawks
9	138	George Kuzmicz	Cornell	ECAC Hockey	Detroit Red Wings
9	139	Pat Boutette	Minnesota–Duluth	WCHA	Toronto Maple Leafs
9	142	Eddie Bumbacco	Notre Dame	WCHA	Montreal Canadiens
9	143	Gary Schofield	Clarkson	ECAC Hockey	Toronto Maple Leafs
10	150	Dave Arundel	Wisconsin	WCHA	Detroit Red Wings
10	151	Fred Riggall	Dartmouth	ECAC Hockey	Montreal Canadiens

== See also ==
- 1971–72 NCAA College Division men's ice hockey season
