= Don Cutts =

Canadian ice hockey player (born 1953)

- Born: February 24, 1956 (age 69); Edmonton, Alberta, Canada
- Height: 6 ft 3 in (191 cm)
- Weight: 205 lb (93 kg; 14 st 9 lb)
- Position: Goaltender
- Caught: Left
- Played for: Edmonton Oilers; Kiekko-Reipas Lahti
- NHL draft: 97th overall, 1973; New York Islanders
- WHA draft: 61st overall, 1973; Houston Aeros
- Playing career: 1974–1982

Donald Edward Cutts (born February 24, 1953) is a Canadian former professional ice hockey goaltender who played 6 games in the National Hockey League with the Edmonton Oilers during the 1979–80 season. Cutts was selected in the seventh round of the 1973 NHL Amateur Draft, 97th overall, by the New York Islanders and in the fourth round of the 1973 WHA Amateur Draft, 48th overall, by the Houston Aeros. He had a seven-year professional career which lasted from 1974 to 1982, largely in the minor leagues

Cutts best minor league season was in the International Hockey League in 1975–76 with the Muskegon Mohawks, where he was named to the IHL First All-Star Team. He also set his best personal mark for games started, with 58. He retired in 1982.

== Career statistics ==
=== Regular season and playoffs ===
			Regular season									Playoffs
Season	Team	League	GP	W	L	T	MIN	GA	SO	GAA	SV%	GP	W	L	MIN	GA	SO	GAA	SV%
1970–71	Rensselaer Polytechnic Institute	ECAC	8	—	—	—	480	20	—	2.73	—	—	—	—	—	—	—	—	—
1971–72	Rensselaer Polytechnic Institute	ECAC	21	—	—	—	1260	72	1	3.43	.898	—	—	—	—	—	—	—	—
1972–73	Rensselaer Polytechnic Institute	ECAC	30	—	—	—	1800	109	1	3.54	.898	—	—	—	—	—	—	—	—
1973–74	Rensselaer Polytechnic Institute	ECAC	30	14	15	1	1800	137	0	4.57	.886	—	—	—	—	—	—	—	—
1974–75	Fort Worth Texans	CHL	15	2	10	0	773	58	0	4.50	—	—	—	—	—	—	—	—	—
1974–75	Muskegon Mohawks	IHL	9	—	—	—	550	24	2	2.62	—	1	0	1	54	5	0	5.55	—
1975–76	Muskegon Mohawks	IHL	58	—	—	—	3356	158	5	2.82	—	4	1	3	240	19	0	4.75	—
1976–77	Fort Worth Texans	CHL	34	12	14	7	1957	111	2	3.40	—	—	—	—	—	—	—	—	—
1976–77	Kalamazoo Wings	IHL	1	—	—	—	60	3	0	3.00	—	—	—	—	—	—	—	—	—
1977–78	Fort Worth Texans	CHL	44	23	13	2	2358	113	2	2.88	.909	6	3	2	350	15	0	2.57	—
1978–79	Fort Wayne Komets	IHL	27	—	—	—	1368	100	0	4.37	—	—	—	—	—	—	—	—	—
1978–79	Fort Worth Texans	CHL	7	1	3	0	283	17	0	3.60	.879	3	0	2	151	7	0	2.78	—
1979–80	Edmonton Oilers	NHL	6	1	2	1	269	16	0	3.57	.887	—	—	—	—	—	—	—	—
1979–80	Houston Apollos	CHL	28	11	13	3	1636	83	2	3.04	.900	5	1	3	274	20	0	4.38	—
1979–80	Muskegon Mohawks	IHL	25	—	—	—	1379	72	4	3.13	—	—	—	—	—	—	—	—	—
1980–81	Kiekko-Reipas Lahti	FIN	26	—	—	—	—	97	—	—	.879	—	—	—	—	—	—	—	—
1980–81	Oklahoma City Stars	CHL	2	1	1	0	120	12	0	6.00	.833	3	0	2	134	8	0	3.58	—
1981–82	Muskegon Mohawks	IHL	24	—	—	—	1315	117	0	5.34	—	—	—	—	—	—	—	—	—
NHL totals			6	1	2	1	269	16	0	3.57	.887	—	—	—	—	—	—	—	—

== Awards and honors ==
Award	Year
All-ECAC Hockey Second Team	1971–72
All-ECAC Hockey Second Team	1972–73

Awards and achievements
Preceded by Bob Brown	ECAC Hockey Rookie of the Year; 1971–72	Succeeded by Vic Stanfield
