= Tom Peluso =

American ice hockey player (born 1952)

- Born: May 7, 1952 (age 72); Grand Rapids, Minnesota, USA
- Height: 6 ft 0 in (183 cm)
- Weight: 183 lb (83 kg; 13 st 1 lb)
- Position: Right wing
- Played for: Denver; Dallas Black Hawks; Port Huron Flags; Toledo Goaldiggers
- National team: United States
- NHL draft: 61st overall, 1972; Chicago Blackhawks
- Playing career: 1970–1976

Tom Peluso (born May 7, 1952) is an American retired ice hockey right wing who was an All-American for Denver.

== Career ==
Peluso helped his high school team, Greenway, make consecutive tournament appearances in the state tournament in 1969 and '70. He performed so well that he was one of the few American players recruited to Denver by Murray Armstrong. Peluso swiftly proved that he belonged by finishing third on the team in scoring with 51 points and helped the pioneers win a conference co-championship and return to the national tournament. The following season Peluso led the Pioneers with 69 points, winning both the regular season and tournament championships in the WCHA. He was named as an All-American and finished 4th in the nation in scoring but Denver lost the national semifinal for the second year in a row and ended up 4th for the tournament.

After Denver's season ended, Peluso joined the US National Team for the 1972 Ice Hockey World Championships. The team was looking for a promotion to the top division after being relegated the year before. The team ended up second in their division, being denied promotion due to a 5–6 loss to Poland. Despite the unfortunate result, Peluso was selected by the Chicago Blackhawks in the 1972 NHL Draft, joining the growing number of college players being considered by pro teams.

Rather than return to Denver, Peluso embarked on a professional career and joined the Dallas Black Hawks in 1972. He missed part of his first season with a torn abdominal muscle but played well enough that, after two years with the club, including the 1974 Adams Cup, he was chosen by the Kansas City Scouts in the Expansion Draft. Peluso was a rising star for the Scouts in 1975, finishing 4th on the Port Huron Flags with 56 points. His professional career was cut short the following year by injuries and he returned home to Grand Rapids.

== Personal life ==
Peluso's brother Jim played hockey at Denver as well. The two played together in Tom's sophomore season. He had two other family members play college hockey as well; cousin Mike (born 1965) played for Alaska Anchorage and later won a Stanley Cup with the New Jersey Devils while nephew Mike (born 1974) played for Minnesota Duluth and retired after 38 games in the NHL.

== Career statistics ==
=== Regular season and playoffs ===
			Regular Season					Playoffs
Season	Team	League	GP	G	A	Pts	PIM	GP	G	A	Pts	PIM
1968–69	Greenway HS	MN-HS	—	—	—	—	—	—	—	—	—	—
1969–70	Greenway HS	MN-HS	—	—	—	—	—	—	—	—	—	—
1970–71	Denver	WCHA	34	23	28	51	54	—	—	—	—	—
1971–72	Denver	WCHA	37	32	37	69	73	—	—	—	—	—
1972–73	Dallas Black Hawks	CHL	50	13	18	31	58	7	0	1	1	11
1973–74	Dallas Black Hawks	CHL	63	19	19	38	59	10	3	3	6	2
1974–75	Port Huron Flags	IHL	65	27	29	56	27	—	—	—	—	—
1975–76	Toledo Goaldiggers	IHL	10	1	2	3	0	—	—	—	—	—
NCAA Totals			71	55	65	120	127	—	—	—	—	—
CHL Totals			113	32	37	69	117	17	3	4	7	13
IHL Totals			75	28	31	59	27	—	—	—	—	—

== Awards and honors ==
Award	Year
All-WCHA First Team	1971–72
AHCA West All-American	1971–72
