= 1972 WCHA men's ice hockey tournament =

1972 WCHA Men's ice hockey tournament
- Dates: March 7–11, 1972
- Teams: 8
- Finals site: Dane County Coliseum; Madison, Wisconsin; DU Arena; Denver, Colorado
- Champions: Wisconsin† (2nd title); Denver‡ (9th title)
- Winning coach: Bob Johnson (2nd title); Murray Armstrong (9th title)
- WCHA Men's Ice Hockey Tournaments

The 1972 WCHA Men's Ice Hockey Tournament was the 13th conference playoff in league history. The tournament was played between March 7 and March 11, 1972. All games were played at home team campus sites, including each of the two regional final series. By winning the regional tournaments, both Wisconsin and Denver were invited to participate in the 1972 NCAA Division I Men's Ice Hockey Tournament.

Though not official designations, Wisconsin is considered as the East Regional Champion† and Denver as the West Regional Champion‡.

== Format ==
The top eight teams in the WCHA, according to their final conference standings, were eligible for the tournament and were seeded No. 1 through No. 8. In the first round the first and eighth seeds, the second and seventh seeds, the third and sixth seeds and the fourth and fifth seeds were matched in two-game series where the school that scored the higher number of goals was declared the winner. After the first round the remaining teams were reseeded No. 1 through No. 4 according to their final conference standings and advanced to the second round. In the second round the first and fourth seeds and the second and third seeds competed in an additional two-game, total goal series with the winners of each being declared as co-conference champions.

=== Conference standings ===
Note: GP = Games played; W = Wins; L = Losses; T = Ties; PTS = Points; GF = Goals For; GA = Goals Against

1971–72 Western Collegiate Hockey Association standings
	Conference							Overall					
	GP	W	L	T	PTS	GF	GA	GP	W	L	T	GF	GA
Denver†*	28	19	9	0	54	148	104	38	27	11	0	205	137
Wisconsin*	28	20	8	0	48	134	87	38	27	10	1	170	106
North Dakota	28	18	10	0	44	130	109	36	21	14	1	161	138
Michigan State	28	15	13	0	42	119	103	36	20	16	0	154	129
Minnesota-Duluth	28	15	13	0	40	129	123	35	16	18	1	148	150
Michigan	28	12	16	0	32	108	163	34	16	18	0	132	186
Michigan Tech	26	11	15	0	30	120	124	34	16	17	1	152	148
Notre Dame	26	10	16	0	28	120	121	34	14	20	0	164	160
Colorado College	28	11	17	0	28	140	165	32	13	19	0	170	184
Minnesota	28	7	21	0	14	83	132	32	8	24	0	97	157
Championship: Wisconsin, Denver † indicates conference regular season champion * indicates conference tournament champion

== Bracket ==
Teams are reseeded after the first round

First Round; March 7–8
1	Denver	7	4
8	Notre Dame	2	2
2	Wisconsin	3	6
7	Michigan Tech	5	1
3	North Dakota	5	10
6	Michigan	1	2
4	Michigan State	4	4
5	Minnesota-Duluth	2	2

Second Round; March 10–11
1	Denver	2	9
4	Michigan State	1	3
2	Wisconsin	1	5
3	North Dakota	1	1

Note: * denotes overtime period(s)

=== First round ===
==== (1) Denver vs. (8) Notre Dame ====
March 7	Denver	7 – 2	Notre Dame	DU Arena

March 8	Denver	4 – 2	Notre Dame	DU Arena

Denver won series 11–4

==== (2) Wisconsin vs. (7) Michigan Tech ====
March 7	Wisconsin	3 – 5	Michigan Tech	Dane County Coliseum

March 8	Wisconsin	6 – 1	Michigan Tech	Dane County Coliseum

Wisconsin won series 9–6

==== (3) North Dakota vs. (6) Michigan ====
March 7	North Dakota	5 – 1	Michigan	Winter Sports Center

March 8	North Dakota	10 – 2	Michigan	Winter Sports Center

North Dakota won series 15–3

==== (4) Michigan State vs. (5) Minnesota-Duluth ====
March 7	Michigan State	4 – 2	Minnesota-Duluth	Demonstration Hall

March 8	Michigan State	4 – 2	Minnesota-Duluth	Demonstration Hall

Michigan State won series 8–4

=== Second round ===
==== (1) Denver vs. (4) Michigan State ====
March 10	Denver	2 – 1	Michigan State	DU Arena

March 11	Denver	9 – 3	Michigan State	DU Arena

Denver won series 11–4

==== (2) Wisconsin vs. (3) North Dakota ====
March 10	Wisconsin	1 – 1	North Dakota	Dane County Coliseum

March 11	Wisconsin	5 – 1	North Dakota	Dane County Coliseum

Wisconsin won series 6–2

== Tournament awards ==
None

== See also ==
- Western Collegiate Hockey Association men's champions
