= Jack Kelley (ice hockey) =

American ice hockey coach (1927–2020)

Biographical details
- Born: July 10, 1927; Medford, Massachusetts, U.S.
- Died: September 16, 2020 (aged 93); Oakland, Maine, U.S.

Playing career
- 1948–1949: US National Team
- 1949–1952: Boston University
- Position: Defense

Coaching career (HC unless noted)
- 1955–1962: Colby College
- 1962–1972: Boston University
- 1972–1973: New England Whalers
- 1972–1975: New England Whalers (General Manager)
- 1975: New England Whalers
- 1976–1977: Colby College
- 1977–1981: New England Whalers (General Manager)
- 1982–1993: Adirondack Red Wings (Dir. of Player Personnel)
- 1993–2001: Pittsburgh Penguins (President)

Head coaching record
- Overall: 303-147-12 (.669)
- Tournaments: 5–3 (.625)

Accomplishments and honors

Championships
- 1962 ECAC Hockey Champion; 1965 ECAC Hockey Champion; 1967 ECAC Hockey Champion; 1971 ECAC Hockey Champion; 1971 NCAA National Championship; 1972 ECAC Hockey Tournament Champion; 1972 NCAA national championship

Awards
- 1962 Spencer Penrose Award; 1973 Boston University Athletic Hall of Fame; 1993 US Hockey Hall of Fame; 2010 World Hockey Association Hall of Fame

John Henry Kelley (July 10, 1927 – September 16, 2020) was an American ice hockey coach and a member of the United States Hockey Hall of Fame. Kelley was the first general manager and head coach of the New England Whalers of the World Hockey Association (WHA). During the 1972-73 season, he won the Howard Baldwin Trophy as the WHA coach of the year and also led the Whalers to the Avco World Trophy. He previously served as head coach at Boston University, leading the Terriers to back-to-back NCAA hockey championships in 1971 and 1972. In his 10-year coaching career at Boston U (1962–72), he compiled a .720 winning percentage and won six Beanpot Tournaments.

Kelley, who was born in Medford, Massachusetts, also played his college hockey at Boston U, participating in the NCAA Hockey Tournament in 1951 and 1952. At the time of his graduation, he was the school's all-time leading scorer among defensemen. He then took over as coach at Colby College in 1955. After leaving the Whalers, he later worked in the front offices of the Detroit Red Wings and Pittsburgh Penguins. His son is television writer and producer, David E. Kelley.

== Honors ==
In 2010, he was elected as an inaugural inductee into the World Hockey Association Hall of Fame in the coaching category.

== Head coaching record ==
=== College ===
Record table
Season	Team	Overall	Conference	Standing	Postseason
Colby Mules Independent (1955–1961)
1955–56	Colby College				
1956–57	Colby College				
1957–58	Colby College				
1958–59	Colby College				
1959–60	Colby College				
1960–61	Colby College				
Colby College:		73–45–3			
Colby Mules (ECAC Hockey) (1961–1962)
1961–62	Colby College	19–6–2	17–1–1	1st	ECAC Third–place game (loss)
Colby College:		19–6–2	17–1–1		
Boston University Terriers (ECAC Hockey) (1962–1972)
1962–63	Boston University	7–16–0	7–15–0	22nd	
1963–64	Boston University	9–13–0	9–12–0	20th	
1964–65	Boston University	25–6–0	15–3–0	1st	ECAC Third–place game (win)
1965–66	Boston University	27–8–0	17–2–0	2nd	NCAA consolation game (loss)
1966–67	Boston University	25–5–1	19–0–1	1st	NCAA runner–up
1967–68	Boston University	20–9–3	13–6–2	5th	ECAC Third–place game (loss)
1968–69	Boston University	19–10–1	13–8–0	6th	ECAC Third–place game (loss)
1969–70	Boston University	20–7–0	17–5–0	3rd	ECAC Third–place game (win)
1970–71	Boston University	28–2–1	18–1–1	1st	NCAA national champion
1971–72	Boston University	26–4–1	15–4–1	3rd	NCAA national champion
Boston University:		206–80–7	143–56–5		
Colby Mules (ECAC 2) (1976–1977)
1976–77	Colby College	8–16–0	5–16–0		
Colby College:		8–16–0	5–16–0		
Total:		306–147–12			
National champion Postseason invitational champion Conference regular season champion Conference regular season and conference tournament champion Division regular season champion Division regular season and conference tournament champion Conference tournament champion

=== WHA ===
Team	Year	Regular season						Postseason
Team	Year	G	W	L	T	Pts	Division rank	Result
New England Whalers	1972–73	78	46	10	2	94	1st in East	Won Avco Cup
New England Whalers	1974–75	5	3	2	0	6	1st in East	Lost in Quarterfinals
New England Whalers	1975–76	33	14	16	3	31	3rd in East	Resigned
WHA Totals		116	63	48	5			

Sporting positions
Preceded by Position created Ron Ryan	General Manager of the New England/Hartford Whalers; 1972–75; 1977–81	Succeeded by Ron Ryan; Larry Pleau
Preceded by Position created Ron Ryan	Head coach of the New England Whalers; 1972–73; 1975	Succeeded by Ron Ryan; Don Blackburn
Awards and achievements
Preceded by Murray Armstrong	Spencer Penrose Award; 1961–62	Succeeded by Tony Frasca
Preceded by Bill Cleary	Hobey Baker Legends of College Hockey Award; 1994	Succeeded by John Mayasich
