= Ron Anderson (ice hockey, born 1950) =

Canadian ice hockey player

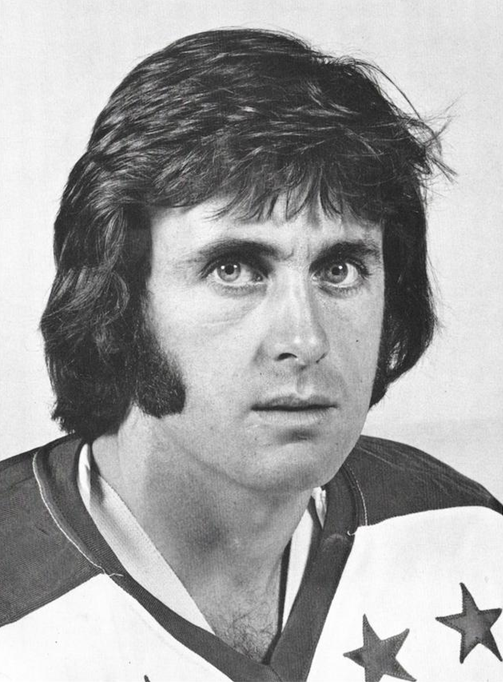
- Anderson in 1974 photo
- Born: January 21, 1949 (age 77) Moncton, New Brunswick, Canada
- Height: 5 ft 10 in (178 cm)
- Weight: 165 lb (75 kg; 11 st 11 lb)
- Position: Right wing
- Shot: Right
- Played for: Washington Capitals; Wiener EV
- NHL draft: Undrafted
- Playing career: 1970–1978

Ron Anderson
Current position
- Title: Senior advisor for player recruitment
- Team: Chicago Blackhawks

Playing career
- Position: Forward

Coaching career (HC unless noted)
- 1978–1979: Welland Steelers
- 1980–1983: Merrimack (assistant)
- 1983–1998: Merrimack
- 1999–2008: Chicago Blackhawks (scout)
- 2008–present: Chicago Blackhawks (Dir. of Player Recruitment)

Head coaching record
- Overall: 254–253–24 (college)
- Tournaments: NCAA D2 (2-2) NCAA DI (2-2)

Accomplishments and honors

Championships
- 1987 ECAC East regular season 1987 ECAC East Tournament; 1988 ECAC East Regular Season; 1988 ECAC East Tournament; 1989 ECAC East Regular Season; 1989 ECAC East Tournament

Awards
- New England D2 all star coach (1988); Clark Hodder coach of the year (1997); Merrimack athletics hall of fame (2023)

Records
- All time wins leader at Merrimack (254)

Ronald Henry Anderson (born January 21, 1950) is a Canadian former professional ice hockey right winger. He who played 28 games in the National Hockey League with the Washington Capitals during the 1974–75 season. The rest of his career, which lasted from 1968 to 1978, was mainly spent in the American Hockey League. After his career he coached at the American collegiate level, and later joined NHL management.

== Playing career ==
Anderson played collegiate hockey for two years at Boston University where he registered 87 points in 62 games for the Terriers. Anderson's scoring touch with BU didn't go unnoticed by the Boston Bruins who signed him as a free agent in 1972. He would play 2 seasons with their AHL affiliate the Boston Braves in 1972–73 and 1973–74. During the 1972-73 season he would score 41 goals on top of 29 assist. This would lead to him being named Dudley "Red" Garrett Memorial Award winner. The NHL expanded by two teams in 1974–75, adding teams in Kansas City, Missouri and Washington, D.C. The expansion Washington Capitals selected him 34th from the Boston Bruins in the 1974 NHL Expansion Draft. He played 28 games during their inaugural season, tallying 9 goals and 7 assists for 16 points. He also spent time that year with the Richmond Robins, the AHL affiliate of the Philadelphia Flyers. Where he would have 20 goals and 19 assists with the Robins. After one more season in the minors Anderson headed to Europe to play for Villacher SV. During the 1976-77 season he would tally 24 goals and 14 assists and win a league title. Followed by one more season on Wiener EV before retiring as a player in 1978.

== Coaching ==
Anderson continued his hockey career, turning almost immediately to coaching when he became a mid-season replacement for the Welland Steelers. In 1980–81 he joined the staff at Merrimack as an assistant and was picked as the replacement for Bruce Parker on the eve of the Warriors' return to Division I. Taking over the program during the 1983-84 season. In just his first year he took the warriors all the way to the 1984 division II national championship. Beating SNHU on aggregate 9-7 in the frozen four. before untimely becoming runner-up up to Bemidji State in the last Division II championship for 8 years, Anderson led Merrimack as a concurrent D-I independent and ECAC East member for the next five years as it tried to find a permanent home. After a 19-12-2 season in 1985-86. Anderson would lead the warriors to a 3 year streak of dominance. Winning 3 straight ECAC East regular season and conference championships in 1987, 1988 and 1989. During the 1986-87 the warriors would go 25-2 in conference play and 29-7 overall. They would play UConn in the first round and beat them 6-2. They would then beat Norwich 3-2 in the semis. Punching their first ticket to ECAC east championship which they would win 3-0 over babson. Closing out one of the best years in program history. But Anderson would find a way to one up this the following year. During the 1987-1988 season They would go on to have a perfect 25-0 conference record and would once again win the ECAC tournament beating Bowdoin 4-1. Finishing the regular season with a 32-4 record. Their performance couldn't have come at a better time because the NCAA expanded the playoff and Anderson's team became the first independent squad invited to the postseason since 1960. Not satisfied with simply making the cut, Merrimack dropped the first game to Hockey East champion Northeastern before routing them in the second game to take the opening series 10-8 on aggregate. Pulling off a huge upset. In the quarterfinals they defeated eventual champion Lake Superior State 4-3 in the first game before their luck ran out and the Warriors were drubbed 5-0 to lose the series. Anderson and the warriors would finish the season with 34 wins the best in the history of the school (as of 2025). He would also be named to the 1988 New England all star team as the coach. Then once again during the 1988-89 season Anderson would lead Merrimack to another terrific season going 27-7 overall and 16-2 in conference. They would get a first round by in the ECAC tournament and would easily take care Massachusetts–Boston in the semis 12-1. Once again faceing Bowdoin in the championship game and would beat them 9-4. Completing the three peat. Throughout this 3 year stretch. Anderson would go 66-4 in conference and 90-20 overall,

After these 3 stellar season Merrimack was finally accepted into a major conference, joining Hockey East for the 1989–90 season. Their winning ways, however, didn't continue with their new, full-Division-I schedule. Anderson's team won only 10 games that campaign and would improve only marginally over the next few years. For their first nine seasons in Hockey East the Warriors would come close but never achieve a winning season. Between 1990 and 1997 Anderson was unable to get a single postseason series victory, going 1-9 in the Hockey East tournament. Despite this Anderson would be named Clark Hodder Division I Coach of the year in 1997. A year later In 1998, however, they shocked the conference by defeating his top-ranked alma mater Boston University twice. To reach the hockey east semifinals for the first time in program history. Before the second round began Anderson was told that his contract would not be renewed and the 7-2 loss to Boston College turned out to be his last game behind the bench. He would finish his time a Merrimack as the all time wins leader. 25 years later in 2023 Anderson would be honored for his time at Merrimack when he was inducted into the Merrimack athletic hall of fame.

== Management ==
Anderson accepted a position as an amateur scout for the Chicago Blackhawks in 1999 and served in that capacity for 9 seasons before being named Director of Player Recruitment in 2008. Anderson continued to serve in that capacity until 2019 and has seen his name etched on the Stanley Cup three times as a result (2010, 2013 and 2015). Since 2020 he has worked as a senior advisor for player recruitment.

== Career statistics ==
=== Regular season and playoffs ===
			Regular season					Playoffs
Season	Team	League	GP	G	A	Pts	PIM	GP	G	A	Pts	PIM
1963–64	Moncton Beavers	MKMHA	3	5	0	5	—	—	—	—	—	—
1963–64	Moncton Rovers	MKMHA	8	16	7	23	12	—	—	—	—	—
1964–65	Moncton Aces	NBAHA	9	15	7	22	4	2	7	2	9	6
1965–66	Moncton Beavers	MKMHA	19	20	21	41	10	1	0	1	1	0
1966–67	Moncton Seals	N-NBSHL	18	14	21	35	20	—	—	—	—	—
1966–67	Moncton Seals	M-Cup	—	—	—	—	—	13	12	14	26	0
1967–68	Moncton Seals	NBJHL	—	—	—	—	—	6	2	3	5	12
1967–68	Moncton Hawks	S-NBSHL	1	1	1	2	0	—	—	—	—	—
1967–68	Fredericton Junior Red Wings	S-NBSHL	19	16	22	38	2	5	3	5	8	2
1967–68	Fredericton Junior Red Wings	M-Cup	—	—	—	—	—	6	6	4	10	2
1967–68	Halifax Junior Canadiens	M-Cup	—	—	—	—	—	4	0	2	2	6
1968–69	Moncton Hawks	NBSHL	20	30	36	66	34	3	4	0	4	0
1969–70	Moncton Hawks	NBSHL	—	—	—	—	—	11	7	6	13	2
1970–71	Boston University	ECAC	31	20	21	41	17	—	—	—	—	—
1971–72	Boston University	ECAC	31	19	27	46	26	—	—	—	—	—
1972–73	Boston Braves	AHL	73	41	29	70	53	—	—	—	—	—
1973–74	Boston Braves	AHL	75	24	31	55	28	—	—	—	—	—
1974–75	Washington Capitals	NHL	28	9	7	16	8	—	—	—	—	—
1974–75	Richmond Robins	AHL	38	20	19	39	19	—	—	—	—	—
1975–76	Richmond Robins	AHL	20	2	3	5	6	—	—	—	—	—
1975–76	New Haven Nighthawks	AHL	17	1	3	4	8	3	0	0	0	0
1976–77	Villacher SV	AUT-2	24	26	14	40	—	—	—	—	—	—
1977–78	Wiener EV	AUT	26	28	8	36	14	—	—	—	—	—
AHL totals			223	88	85	173	114	3	0	0	0	0
NHL totals			28	9	7	16	8	—	—	—	—	—

=== Head coaching record ===
Record table
Season	Team	Overall	Conference	Standing	Postseason
Merrimack Warriors (ECAC 2) (1983–1984)
1983–84	Merrimack	13–19–0	10–10–0	T–12th	NCAA Runner-Up
1984–85	Merrimack	16–16–3	12–6–3	9th	ECAC East Quarterfinals
Merrimack:		29–35–3	22–16–3		
Merrimack Warriors (ECAC East) (1985–1989)
1985–86	Merrimack	19–12–2	16–4–2	2nd	ECAC East Semifinals
1986–87	Merrimack	29–7–0	22–2–0	1st	ECAC East Champion
1987–88	Merrimack	34–6–0	22–0–0	1st	NCAA Quarterfinals
1988–89	Merrimack	27–7–0	14–2–0	1st	ECAC East Champion
Merrimack:		109–32–2	74–8–2		
Merrimack Warriors (Hockey East) (1989–1998)
1989–90	Merrimack	10–25–1	3–18–0	8th	Hockey East Quarterfinals
1990–91	Merrimack	13–19–1	7–14–0	6th	Hockey East Quarterfinals
1991–92	Merrimack	13–21–0	4–17–0	8th	Hockey East Quarterfinals
1992–93	Merrimack	14–20–2	8–16–0	6th	Hockey East Quarterfinals
1993–94	Merrimack	16–19–2^	10–14–2^	7th	Hockey East Quarterfinals
1994–95	Merrimack	14–18–5	7–12–5–3	5th	Hockey East Quarterfinals
1995–96	Merrimack	10–19–5	4–18–2–0	9th	
1996–97	Merrimack	15–19–2	11–11–2	5th	Hockey East Quarterfinals
1997–98	Merrimack	11–26–1	4–20–0	t-8th	Hockey East Semifinals
Merrimack:		116–186–19	58–140–11		
Total:		254–253–24			
National champion Postseason invitational champion Conference regular season champion Conference regular season and conference tournament champion Division regular season champion Division regular season and conference tournament champion Conference tournament champion

^ Maine was required to retroactively forfeit two victories against Merrimack which are reflected here.

== Awards and achievements ==
- 1972–73 – Dudley "Red" Garrett Memorial Award (AHL Rookie of the year)
- 1972–73 – AHL Second Team All-Star
- 1977 Austrian National League champion
- 2010 Stanley Cup (Chicago Blackhawks)
- 2013 Stanley Cup (Chicago Blackhawks)
- 2015 Stanley Cup (Chicago Blackhawks)

== Transactions ==
- Signed as a free agent by the Boston Bruins, June, 1972.
- Claimed from the Boston Bruins by the Washington Capitals in the 1974 NHL Expansion Draft, June 12, 1974.
- Traded by the Washington Capitals with Bob Gryp to the New Haven Nighthawks (AHL) for Rich Nantais and Alain Langlais, February 23, 1976.
