= Tim Regan (ice hockey) =

American ice hockey player (born 1949)

- Born: December 28, 1949 (age 76) Providence, Rhode Island, U.S.
- Height: 6 ft 2 in (188 cm)
- Weight: 200 lb (91 kg; 14 st 4 lb)
- Position: Goaltender
- Played for: AHL; Cincinnati Swords; Hershey Bears; EHL/SHL; Charlotte Checkers
- National team: United States
- NHL draft: 84th overall, 1970; Buffalo Sabres
- Playing career: 1969–1975
Medal record
Men's ice hockey
Representing United States
Olympic Games
Silver medal – second place	1972 Sapporo	Team

Timothy Regan (born December 28, 1949) is an American former professional ice hockey goaltender who played in the American Hockey League (AHL), as well as with the Boston University Terriers (BU) and the United States National Team.

Playing for BU, Regan won two National Championships and set single season records for both goals against average (GAA) and save percentage. As a member of Team USA he was awarded a silver medal in the 1972 Winter Olympics. He received the medal despite leaving the team prior to the hockey tournament's completion in order to return to BU.

== Playing career ==
When Regan began his collegiate career at Boston University freshmen were not allowed to play on varsity teams. As a result, Regan played for the Terriers' freshman team. In his freshman year he posted an 8–0 record and a 1.12 GAA as the team went undefeated at 17–0. Joining the varsity team the following year, he and teammate Dan Brady formed one of college hockey's "all-time greatest goaltending tandems". During his sophomore season Regan posted a 2.82 GAA, ranking him second in the ECAC East division, as the Terriers finished third in the ECAC Championship. In the 1970–71 season, Regan's junior year, he set BU records for both GAA (1.77) and save percentage (.929) which still stand. BU also won the National Championship; however, Regan was the backup during the championship run.

In August 1971 Regan was asked to try out for the United States Olympic hockey team. He declined the invitation, so as not to lose his scholarship. He later noted that he felt if he had left school at that point he probably would not ever return. In 1972 a flu epidemic presented Regan with another opportunity to represent the United States at the 1972 Winter Olympics. An exhibition game was scheduled between Team USA and Boston College (BC). Several members of the BC team had come down with the flu, and as a result, BC withdrew from the game and suggested that Team USA play BU instead. In the game Regan was terrific despite a 4–4 final score. The following day Team USA head coach Murray Williamson asked Regan to join the team. He agreed on the condition that he was guaranteed a trip to Sapporo, Japan, site of the Winter Games, and that if he was not playing he could return to BU should they need him. He played in 10 exhibition games with the National Team and traveled with them to Japan. When Team USA declared the roster for the Olympic tournament Regan was left off, meaning he would not get an opportunity to play in the tournament. As a result, he was asked to return to BU after Brady twisted his knee. Before the games ended Regan returned to BU and led them to their second consecutive National Championship. Regan was named Most Outstanding Player of the 1972 NCAA championship. After the Olympics ended, teammate Robbie Ftorek brought Regan's silver medal to him. He was awarded the medal for being part of Team USA, despite his early exit from the games. Upon giving him the medal, Ftorek told him, "You're part of the program, you're part of the team, and this is yours."

Regan was drafted by the Buffalo Sabres in the seventh round, 84th overall, in the 1970 NHL entry draft. He played three years in the Sabres organization, primarily in the American Hockey league. In 1993 he was inducted into the Boston University Hall of Fame.

After retiring from hockey, Regan worked in the lumber industry in his hometown of Cranston, Rhode Island.

== Awards and honors ==
Award	Year
Olympic Silver Medal	1972
All-NCAA All-Tournament Team	1972
NCAA Tournament Most Outstanding Player	1972
Rhode Island Hockey Hall of Fame	2024

Awards and achievements
Preceded by Dan Brady	NCAA Tournament Most Outstanding Player; 1972	Succeeded by Dean Talafous
