= Ric Jordan =

Canadian ice hockey player

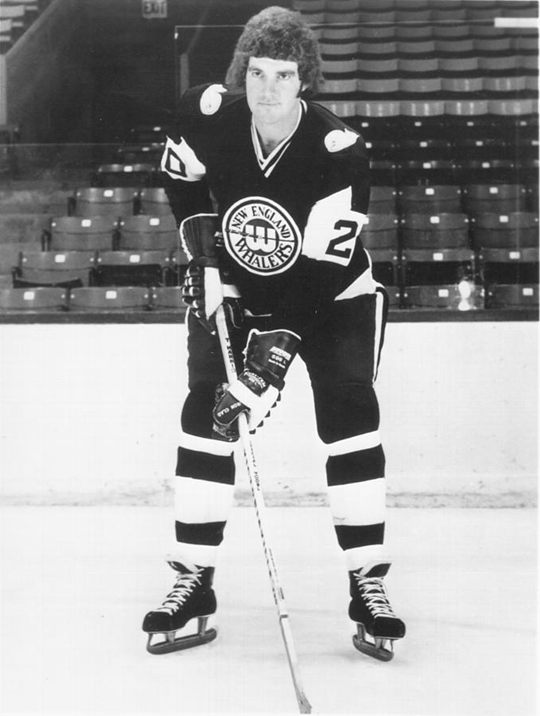
- Born: March 31, 1950 (age 75) Toronto, Ontario, Canada
- Height: 6 ft 3 in (191 cm)
- Weight: 196 lb (89 kg; 14 st 0 lb)
- Position: Defence
- Shot: Left
- Played for: New England Whalers; Quebec Nordiques; Calgary Cowboys
- NHL draft: 105th overall, 1970; Montreal Canadiens
- Playing career: 1972–1981

John Richard Jordan (born March 31, 1950) is a Canadian retired professional ice hockey defenceman who played 183 games in the World Hockey Association for the New England Whalers, Calgary Cowboys, and Quebec Nordiques. Jordan was born in Toronto, Ontario, Canada. As a youth, he played in the 1962 Quebec International Pee-Wee Hockey Tournament with Toronto Shopsy's.

== Career statistics ==
			Regular season					Playoffs
Season	Team	League	GP	G	A	Pts	PIM	GP	G	A	Pts	PIM
1966–67	Markham Waxers	MetJBHL	36	5	17	22	—	—	—	—	—	—
1967–68	Toronto Marlboros	OHA-Jr.	54	6	28	34	113	—	—	—	—	—
1968–69	Toronto Marlboros	OHA-Jr.	53	9	29	38	70	—	—	—	—	—
1969–70	Boston University	NCAA	—	—	—	—	—	—	—	—	—	—
1970–71	Boston University	NCAA	30	12	38	50	55	—	—	—	—	—
1971–72	Boston University	NCAA	31	13	27	40	34	—	—	—	—	—
1972–73	New England Whalers	WHA	34	1	5	6	12	4	0	0	0	0
1972–73	Rhode Island Eagles	EHL-Sr.	22	6	12	18	23	4	0	3	3	7
1973–74	New England Whalers	WHA	34	0	3	3	14	7	0	0	0	6
1973–74	Jacksonville Barons	AHL	45	8	8	16	54	—	—	—	—	—
1974–75	Quebec Nordiques	WHA	56	6	8	14	75	6	0	0	0	8
1974–75	Maine Nordiques	NAHL-Sr.	3	1	0	1	8	—	—	—	—	—
1975–76	Quebec Nordiques	WHA	54	4	7	11	75	—	—	—	—	—
1975–76	Maine Nordiques	NAHL-Sr.	2	1	0	1	0	—	—	—	—	—
1976–77	Tidewater Sharks	SHL-Sr.	37	5	16	21	48	—	—	—	—	—
1976–77	Erie Blades	NAHL-Sr.	34	2	25	27	42	9	0	5	5	10
1976–77	Calgary Cowboys	WHA	5	0	0	0	4	—	—	—	—	—
1980–81	HC Neuchâtel Young Sprinters	NLB	—	—	—	—	—	—	—	—	—	—
1980–81	Klagenfurter AC	Austria	19	4	4	8	34	—	—	—	—	—
WHA totals			183	11	23	34	180	17	0	0	0	14

== Awards and honours ==
Award	Year
All-ECAC Hockey Second Team	1970–71
ECAC Hockey All-Tournament Second Team	1971, 1972
All-ECAC Hockey Second Team	1971–72
All-NCAA All-Tournament Team	1972
