= Larry Fullan =

Canadian ice hockey player

- Born: August 11, 1949 (age 76) Toronto, Ontario, Canada
- Height: 5 ft 11 in (180 cm)
- Weight: 185 lb (84 kg; 13 st 3 lb)
- Position: Forward
- Shot: Left
- Played for: Washington Capitals
- NHL draft: Undrafted
- Playing career: 1972–1976

Lawrence James Fullan (born August 11, 1949) is a Canadian former ice hockey forward. He played 4 games in the National Hockey League with the Washington Capitals during the 1974–75 season. The rest of his career, which lasted from 1972 to 1976, was spent in the minor American Hockey League.

== Playing career ==
Signed as a free agent in 1972 by the Montreal Canadiens, Fullan never played with the parent club and was left exposed in the 1974 NHL Expansion Draft where he was claimed by the Washington Capitals. He played four games for the Capitals and spent most of the next two years in the minors before retiring from active professional play in 1976.

Fullan graduated from Cornell University in 1972, where he was also a member of the Quill and Dagger society.

His older brother is Michael Fullan.

== Career statistics ==
=== Regular season and playoffs ===
			Regular season					Playoffs
Season	Team	League	GP	G	A	Pts	PIM	GP	G	A	Pts	PIM
1965–66	St. Michael's Buzzers	MetJBHL	—	—	—	—	—	—	—	—	—	—
1966–67	Etobicoke Indians	MetJBHL	—	—	—	—	—	—	—	—	—	—
1967–68	Etobicoke Indians	MetJBHL	—	—	—	—	—	—	—	—	—	—
1969–70	Cornell University	ECAC	29	17	33	50	4	—	—	—	—	—
1970–71	Cornell University	ECAC	27	20	32	52	12	—	—	—	—	—
1971–72	Cornell University	ECAC	29	20	43	63	28	—	—	—	—	—
1972–73	Nova Scotia Voyageurs	AHL	50	4	10	14	4	13	2	0	2	4
1973–74	Nova Scotia Voyageurs	AHL	76	37	47	84	19	6	2	5	7	10
1974–75	Washington Capitals	NHL	4	1	0	1	0	—	—	—	—	—
1974–75	Richmond Robins	AHL	71	23	42	65	38	7	2	1	3	24
1975–76	Richmond Robins	AHL	76	18	57	75	26	8	2	6	8	2
AHL totals			273	82	156	238	87	34	8	12	20	40
NHL totals			4	1	0	1	0	—	—	—	—	—

== Awards and honours ==
Award	Year
ECAC Hockey All-Tournament Second Team	1971
All-ECAC Hockey First Team	1971–72
AHCA East All-American	1971–72
ECAC Hockey All-Tournament First Team	1972
