= Danby, Missouri =

Unincorporated community in Missouri

Coordinates: 38°06′33″N 90°18′27″W

Danby is an unincorporated community in southeast Jefferson County, in the U.S. state of Missouri.

The community is adjacent to the west side of I-55 approximately nine miles southeast of Festus. Isle du Bois Creek, which forms the border between Jefferson and Ste. Genevieve counties, flows past approximately 1.5 miles south of the community.

== History ==
A post office called Danby was established in 1883, and remained in operation until 1955. It is unknown why the name Danby was applied to this community.
