= Danby (appliances) =

Home appliance brand

Danby Appliances Inc.
- Company type: Private
- Industry: Home appliances
- Founded: 1947; 79 years ago Montreal, Quebec, Canada
- Headquarters: Guelph, Ontario, Canada
- Key people: Jim Estill (President and CEO)
- Website: https://www.danby.com

Danby is the brand name of a line of appliances marketed by Danby Appliances Inc. and Danby Appliances Ltd., led by President and CEO Jim Estill. Danby specializes in designing, manufacturing, and distributing small appliances through national and independent retailers in Canada, the US, UK, and Mexico. It is a privately held Canadian and US company headquartered in Guelph, Ontario, and Findlay, Ohio. While the company is well-established in Canada, more than half of its sales are outside the country. The company has additional locations in Tolleson, Arizona; Saraland, Alabama; and Foxboro, Massachusetts, as well as a location in Guangzhou, China. It is affiliated with manufacturers in China, Mexico, Turkey, Thailand, India and the United States.

The family-owned company first began business in Montreal, Quebec, in 1947. Their first products were hot plates and slow cookers. Danby also marketed an early form of a portable air conditioner. as well as some private labelled brands for national retail stores. Annual sales are estimated at 400 million dollars through the sale of compact and specialty appliances such as microwaves, compact refrigerators, wine coolers, ranges, washing machines, air conditioners and dehumidifiers.
