= Maby =

Maby is a surname. Notable people with the surname include:

- Graham Maby (born 1952), English bass guitar player
- J. Cecil Maby (1902–1971), British biophysicist, dowser, and psychical researcher

== See also ==
- Aby (name)
- Daby
- Mary (name)
