= Ohio Bobcats men's ice hockey =

- University: Ohio University
- Conference: CSCHL/ TSCHL; ACHA Division I/II Division
- Head coach: Lionel Mauron
- Arena: Ossian C. Bird Arena; Athens, Ohio
- Colors: Hunter green and white

The Ohio Bobcats men's ice hockey team is a college ice hockey program that represents Ohio University. The team competes at the American Collegiate Hockey Association (ACHA) Division I and 2 levels as a member of the Central States Collegiate Hockey League (CSCHL). Ohio University has 2 teams in the ACHA Divisions 1 and 2.

== History ==
Ohio was one of four founding members of the CCHA along with Bowling Green, Ohio State and Saint Louis. The Bobcats played in the CCHA for two seasons but finished dead-last both years. Ohio won only a single conference game in either season and after the 1972–73 season both Ohio and Ohio State left the CCHA. While the Buckeyes kept their team at the varsity level the Bobcats dropped their team back to club status where they have remained as of 2019.

== Season-by-Season Results ==
| NCAA D-I Champions | NCAA Frozen Four | Conference Regular Season Champions | Conference Playoff Champions |

| Season | Conference | Regular Season (Note: Code explanation; GP—Games Played, W—Wins, L—Losses, T—Tied games, Pts—Points*) | | | | | | | | | | | Conference Tournament Results | National Tournament Results |
| Season | Conference | Conference | | | | | | Overall | | | | | Conference Tournament Results | National Tournament Results |
| Season | Conference | GP | W | L | T | Pts* | Finish | GP | W | L | T | % | Conference Tournament Results | National Tournament Results |
|---|---|---|---|---|---|---|---|---|---|---|---|---|---|---|
John McComb (1971–1973)
| 1971–72 | CCHA | 12 | 1 | 11 | 0 | 2 | 4th | 24 | 7 | 17 | 0 | .292 | Lost CCHA Semifinal, 1–7 (Ohio State) | |
| 1972–73 | CCHA | 14 | 1 | 13 | 0 | 2 | 5th | 24 | 6 | 18 | 0 | .250 | | |
| Totals | | | | | | | | GP | W | L | T | % | Championships | |
| Regular Season | | | | | | | | 47 | 13 | 34 | 0 | .277 | | |
| Conference Post-season | | | | | | | | 1 | 0 | 1 | 0 | .000 | | |
| NCAA Post-season | | | | | | | | 0 | 0 | 0 | 0 | – | | |
| Regular Season and Post-season Record | | | | | | | | 48 | 13 | 35 | 0 | .271 | | |

* Winning percentage is used when conference schedules are unbalanced.
