= Thomas Danby =

Thomas Danby may refer to:

- Sir Thomas Danby (c. 1530–1590), son of Christopher Danby and High Sheriff of Yorkshire, 1575–1576
- Sir Thomas Danby (died 1660) (1610–1660), English landowner a Royalist, briefly a member of parliament for Richmond, Yorkshire
- Thomas Danby (mayor) (1631–1667), mayor of Leeds, England and MP in 1661 for Malton
- Thomas Danby (artist) (1818–1886), English landscape painter
- Leeds Thomas Danby, college in Leeds, predecessor of Leeds City College

== See also ==
- Tom Danby (Thompson Danby, 1926–2022), English rugby player
