= John Danby (ice hockey) =

Canadian ice hockey player and coach

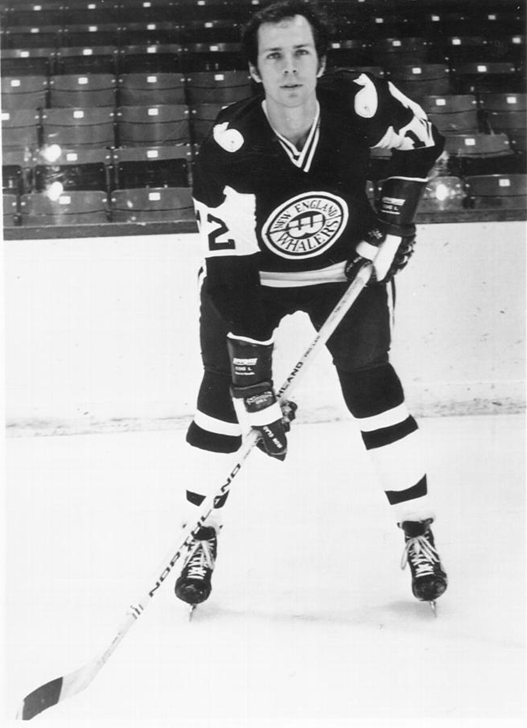
- Born: July 20, 1948 (age 77) Toronto, Ontario, Canada
- Height: 5 ft 10 in (178 cm)
- Weight: 165 lb (75 kg; 11 st 11 lb)
- Position: Forward
- Shot: Right
- Played for: New England Whalers (WHA)
- WHA draft: Undrafted
- Playing career: 1969–1979

John Danby (born July 20, 1948) is a Canadian former professional ice hockey player and coach.

== Career ==
After winning consecutive national championships with Boston University in the early-1970s, Danby joined the New England Whalers of the World Hockey Association. He played throughout the 1970s before retiring and returning to his alma mater to serve as an assistant coach for two seasons.

== Career statistics ==
			Regular season					Playoffs
Season	Team	League	GP	G	A	Pts	PIM	GP	G	A	Pts	PIM
1966-67	Dixie Beehives	MJBHL	—	—	—	—	—	—	—	—	—	—
1969–70	Boston University	ECAC	27	25	21	46	12	—	—	—	—	—
1970–71	Boston University	ECAC	31	28	36	64	10	—	—	—	—	—
1971–72	Boston University	ECAC	26	26	24	50	14	—	—	—	—	—
1972–73	New England Whalers	WHA	77	14	23	37	10	8	0	0	0	0
1973–74	New England Whalers	WHA	72	2	2	4	6	7	1	0	1	0
1974–75	Cape Codders	NAHL	69	24	43	67	27	4	1	2	3	0
1974–75	New England Whalers	WHA	—	—	—	—	—	4	0	1	1	0
1975–76	Cape Codders	NAHL	33	9	19	28	6	—	—	—	—	—
1975–76	New England Whalers	WHA	1	0	0	0	0	—	—	—	—	—
1975–76	Broome Dusters	NAHL	34	9	23	32	19	—	—	—	—	—
1976–77	Maine Nordiques	NAHL	36	10	22	32	2	11	5	4	9	2
1978–79	New Hampshire/Cape Cod Freedoms	NEHL	23	11	18	29	6	—	—	—	—	—
WHA totals			150	16	25	41	16	19	1	1	2	0

== Awards and honors ==
Award	Year
All-ECAC Hockey First Team	1970–71
All-ECAC Hockey Second Team	1971–72
AHCA East All-American	1971–72
ECAC Hockey All-Tournament First Team	1972
All-NCAA All-Tournament Team	1972

Awards and achievements
Preceded by Dave Hynes	ECAC Hockey Most Outstanding Player in Tournament; 1972	Succeeded by Carlo Ugolini
