= Don Cahoon =

American ice hockey coach (born 1949)

Biographical details
- Born: April 13, 1949 (age 77); Lynn, Massachusetts, U.S.

Playing career
- 1969–1972: Boston University
- Position: Left wing

Coaching career (HC unless noted)
- 1973–1974: Lehigh
- 1974–1979: Boston University (assistant)
- 1979–1982: Norwich
- 1982–1983: Vienna Capitals II
- 1983–1986: UMass Lowell (assistant)
- 1987–1988: Boston University (assistant)
- 1988–1990: Minnesota North Stars (scout)
- 1990–1991: Boston University (assistant)
- 1991: Team USA
- 1991–2000: Princeton
- 1995: Team USA
- 2000–2012: UMass

Head coaching record
- Overall: 346–398–78 (college)
- Tournaments: 1–2

Accomplishments and honors

Championships
- ECAC Hockey (1998)

Don "Toot" Cahoon (born April 13, 1949) is an American retired ice hockey coach. He was the head coach of the Princeton Tigers when they won their first conference tournament championship in 1998. For almost 40 years Cahoon worked behind the bench of various collegiate hockey programs, reaching the NCAA tournament twice as a head coach.

== Career ==
Cahoon's start in collegiate hockey came as a player for Boston University starting three seasons for the Terriers (typical as freshman did not play varsity at the time) which included back-to-back National Championships in 1971 and 1972. He also played for the United States national team at the 1972 ice hockey world championship pool B tournament in Romania.

After graduating with a B.S. in education, Cahoon continued his playing career for one more season, lacing it up for seven games for the New England Blades of the EHL, the league's last year in operation. Cahoon began his coaching career the following season, leading Lehigh University team to the 1973–74 Mid-Atlantic Conference title. After a successful campaign his first time out, Cahoon joined the staff at his alma mater, becoming an assistant at BU under 2nd-year head coach Jack Parker. Cahoon enjoyed as much success as an assistant with the Terriers as he had as a player, winning three consecutive conference tournament titles, three regular season titles, and the 1978 National Championship. After five years as an assistant coach Cahoon accepted the head coaching duties for the Division II Norwich Cadets. In his three seasons at Norwich Cahoon led the Cadets to the postseason each year while continuing the University's strong hockey tradition. After 1981–82 Cahoon headed across the Atlantic to become the head coach and direction of hockey operations for the Vienna Capitals.

Cahoon's European stint only lasted one season, however, and he was back as an assistant coach in college, this time for Massachusetts-Lowell as they made the transition from D-II into the Division I ranks. Though not unexpected Massachusetts-Lowell grew progressively worse while Cahoon was there and he left the university after his third season. After a year off, Cahoon returned to BU for the second time, spending a year as an assistant for Jack Parker before accepting a job as a pro scout for the Minnesota North Stars of the NHL. Cahoon's second foray into professional hockey lasted only slightly longer than his first and he rejoined the Terriers two years after he left for the second time. During his third trip behind the bench for BU, Cahoon also served as the head coach for Team USA at the 1991 World Junior Ice Hockey Championships, leading the Americans to a respectable 4th-place finish.

After 1991 Cahoon left Boston University for good when he received his first Division-I head coaching job, replacing Jim Higgins at Princeton. The Tigers were one of the founding members of ECAC Hockey and in the thirty years prior to Cahoon's arrival they had a winning season only once, in 1967–68. That trend continued for the early part of Cahoon's tenure but he was able to get the Tigers head's above water with a plus-.500 campaign in 1994–95. After a lull the following year, Cahoon pushed Princeton to three consecutive winning seasons, including a conference tournament title in 1997–98 and its first 20-win season the following year. Despite the success, Cahoon left the Tigers after the 2000 season to take on the same role with Massachusetts, a team that had recently brought back its ice hockey program but had yet to see much success.

Similar to how he had improved Princeton, Cahoon took a couple of years to right the ship in Amherst, posting two 8-win seasons before leading the Minutemen to a 19-win campaign in year three, their first winning record since joining Hockey East in 1994. Cahoon continued to enjoy moderate success with UMass for the next several seasons, hovering around .500, and brought the Minutemen to their first NCAA berth and win in 2007 behind the stellar goaltending of Jonathan Quick, but the results started to turn bad in the second decade of the 21st century and Cahoon agreed to resign from his post after the 2011–12 season. Cahoon ended with a 346–398–78 record as a head coach.

== Head coaching record ==
=== College ===
Record table
Season	Team	Overall	Conference	Standing	Postseason
Lehigh Engineers (ECAC 3) (1973–1974)
1973–74	Lehigh	10–5–2	0–1–0	T–17th	
Lehigh:		10–5–2			
Norwich Cadets (ECAC 2) (1979–1982)
1979–80	Norwich	12–13–0	9–12–0	T–20th	ECAC 2 West Quarterfinal
1980–81	Norwich	18–11–1	14–8–1	9th	ECAC 2 West Semifinal
1981–82	Norwich	18–11–1	15–9–1	8th	ECAC 2 West Quarterfinal
Norwich:		48–35–2			
Princeton Tigers (ECAC Hockey) (1991–2000)
1991–92	Princeton	12–14–1	9–12–1	9th	ECAC Quarterfinals
1992–93	Princeton	9–17–3	6–13–3	10th	ECAC Quarterfinals
1993–94	Princeton	10–15–3	7–12–3	9th	ECAC first round
1994–95	Princeton	18–13–4	9–10–3	7th	ECAC Runner-Up
1995–96	Princeton	7–19–4	5–14–2	10th	ECAC first round
1996–97	Princeton	18–12–4	11–8–3	t-5th	ECAC third-place game (loss)
1997–98	Princeton	18–11–7	7–9–6	7th	NCAA West regional quarterfinals
1998–99	Princeton	20–12–2	13–8–1	4th	ECAC third-place game (loss)
1999–00	Princeton	10–16–4	8–9–4	t-6th	ECAC first round
Princeton:		122–129–32	75–95–26		
Massachusetts Minutemen (Hockey East) (2000–2012)
2000–01	Massachusetts	8–22–4	7–15–2	9th	
2001–02	Massachusetts	8–24–2	3–19–2	9th	
2002–03	Massachusetts	19–17–1	10–14–0	6th	Hockey East Semifinals
2003–04	Massachusetts	17–14–6	12–9–3	3rd	Hockey East Runner-Up
2004–05	Massachusetts	13–23–2	6–16–2	8th	Hockey East Quarterfinals
2005–06	Massachusetts	13–21–2	10–15–2	8th	Hockey East Quarterfinals
2006–07	Massachusetts	21–13–5	15–9–3	4th	NCAA East Regional Finals
2007–08	Massachusetts	14–16–6	9–13–5	8th	Hockey East Quarterfinals
2008–09	Massachusetts	16–20–3	10–14–3	7th	Hockey East Quarterfinals
2009–10	Massachusetts	18–18–0	13–14–0	t-7th	Hockey East Quarterfinals
2010–11	Massachusetts	6–23–6	5–16–6	8th	Hockey East Quarterfinals
2011–12	Massachusetts	13–18–5	9–14–4	t-8th	Hockey East Quarterfinals
Massachusetts:		166–229–42	109–168–32		
Total:		346–398–78			
National champion Postseason invitational champion Conference regular season champion Conference regular season and conference tournament champion Division regular season champion Division regular season and conference tournament champion Conference tournament champion

== Awards and honors ==
Award	Year
All-NCAA All-Tournament team	1971

Awards and achievements
Preceded by Dick Umile	Bob Kullen Coach of the Year Award; 2002–03	Succeeded by Jerry York
