= Murray Williamson =

American ice hockey player and coach (1934–2025)

Murray Williamson (January 13, 1934 – September 15, 2025) was a Canadian-born American ice hockey player and coach.

== Biography ==
Williamson was born on January 13, 1934, in Winnipeg.

Williamson was an All American at the University of Minnesota in 1959 and played, coached and managed in the United States Hockey League with the St. Paul Steers. He coached the United States National teams in the World Hockey Championships in 1967, 1969 and 1971 and the United States Olympic teams in 1968 and 1972. The 1972 team won the silver medal at the 1972 Winter Olympics held in Sapporo, Japan. He was instrumental in the founding of the Midwest Junior Hockey League in 1973 (now called the United States Hockey League) and was the coach and general manager of the first United States National Junior team that participated in the inaugural World Junior Tournament held in Leningrad, Russia in 1973.

Williamson was inducted into the United States Hockey Hall of Fame in 2005, the Massachusetts Hockey Hall of Fame in 2000, the Manitoba Hockey Hall of Fame in 2009, and the University of Minnesota Athletic Hall of Fame in 2008. He was awarded the Legend of Hobey Baker Award in 2005 for his contributions to college hockey. He is featured in the book Striking Silver: The Untold Story of America's Forgotten Hockey Team, published by Sorts Publishing LLC in 2006 by the Caraccioli brothers.

Williamson died on September 15, 2025, aged 91.

== Awards and honors ==
Award	Year
AHCA West All-American	1958–59

Awards and achievements
Preceded by Ron Mason	Hobey Baker Legends of College Hockey Award; 2005	Succeeded by Cooney Weiland
