= Dave Elenbaas =

Canadian ice hockey player

- Born: February 20, 1952 (age 73); Chatham, Ontario, Canada
- Height: 5 ft 10 in (178 cm)
- Weight: 175 lb (79 kg; 12 st 7 lb)
- Position: Goaltender
- Caught: Left
- Played for: Nova Scotia Voyageurs
- NHL draft: 62nd overall, 1972; Montreal Canadiens
- Playing career: 1973–1978

David Stuart Elenbaas (born February 20, 1952) is a Canadian former professional ice hockey goaltender who played for the Nova Scotia Voyageurs in the American Hockey League. He won the Harry "Hap" Holmes Memorial Award in 1974, 1975, 1976 and 1977.
