= Boston University Terriers men's ice hockey =

Ice hockey team

- Current season
- University: Boston University
- Conference: Hockey East
- First season: 1917–18
- Head coach: Jay Pandolfo; 4th season, 81–35–4 (.692)
- Assistant coaches: Joe Pereira; Kim Brandvold; Cam Doomany
- Arena: Agganis Arena; Boston, Massachusetts
- Student section: The Dog Pound
- Colors: Scarlet and white
- Fight song: Go BU
- Mascot: Rhett the Boston Terrier

NCAA tournament champions
- 1971, 1972, 1978, 1995, 2009

NCAA tournament runner-up
- 1950, 1967, 1991, 1994, 1997, 2015, 2025

NCAA tournament Frozen Four
- 1950, 1951, 1953, 1960, 1966, 1967, 1971, 1972, 1974, 1975, 1976, 1977, 1978, 1990, 1991, 1993, 1994, 1995, 1996, 1997, 2009, 2015, 2023, 2024, 2025

NCAA tournament appearances
- 1950, 1951, 1953, 1960, 1966, 1967, 1971, 1972, 1974, 1975, 1976, 1977, 1978, 1984, 1986, 1990, 1991, 1992, 1993, 1994, 1995, 1996, 1997, 1998, 2000, 2002, 2003, 2005, 2006, 2007, 2009, 2012, 2015, 2016, 2017, 2018, 2021, 2023, 2024, 2025

Conference tournament champions
- NEIHL: 1951, 1952; ECAC: 1972, 1974, 1975, 1976, 1977; Hockey East: 1986, 1991, 1994, 1995, 1997, 2006, 2009, 2015, 2018, 2023

Conference regular season champions
- NEIHL: 1938, 1939, 1947, 1948, 1950; ECAC: 1965, 1967, 1971, 1976, 1978, 1979; Hockey East: 1994, 1995, 1996, 1997, 1998, 2000, 2006, 2009, 2015, 2017, 2023

Current uniform

The Boston University Terriers men’s ice hockey team is the college ice hockey team that represents Boston University. They played their first game in 1918 and have won five national championships, while making 25 appearances in the Frozen Four.

BU has won 12 major conference tournament championships as well as 32 titles in the historic Beanpot tournament featuring the four major Boston collegiate hockey teams. BU played in the Eastern College Athletic Conference (ECAC) from 1961 to 1984, winning five tournament championships; and has since competed in the Hockey East Association, winning ten tournament titles. Ice hockey is the most popular sport at Boston University and has a large fan base on campus and among BU alumni nationwide.

== Current roster ==
As of September 8, 2025.

No.	Nat.	Player	Class	Pos	Height	Weight	DoB	Hometown	Previous team	NHL rights
1	(United States)	Steven Luciano	Freshman	G	6' 1" (1.85 m)	179 lb (81 kg)	2007-03-01	New Canaan, Connecticut	Salisbury School (USHS–CT)	—
2	(United States)	Gavin McCarthy	Junior	D	6' 1" (1.85 m)	185 lb (84 kg)	2005-06-02	Clarence Center, New York	Muskegon Lumberjacks (USHL)	BUF, 86th overall 2023
7	(United States)	Nick Roukounakis	Sophomore	F	6' 2" (1.88 m)	225 lb (102 kg)	2003-09-08	Pembroke, Massachusetts	Tri-City Storm (USHL)	—
8	(United States)	Brandon Svoboda	Sophomore	F	6' 3" (1.91 m)	207 lb (94 kg)	2005-02-04	Level Green, Pennsylvania	Fargo Force (USHL)	SJS, 71st overall 2023
9	(Canada)	Sacha Boisvert	Sophomore	F	6' 2" (1.88 m)	176 lb (80 kg)	2006-05-17	Trois-Rivières, Québec	North Dakota (NCHC)	CHI, 18th overall 2024
10	(Canada)	Jonathan Morello	Freshman	F	6' 2" (1.88 m)	192 lb (87 kg)	2006-07-31	Toronto, Ontario	Dubuque Fighting Saints (USHL)	BOS, 154th overall 2024
12	(United States)	Jack Harvey	Junior	F	5' 10" (1.78 m)	176 lb (80 kg)	2003-03-31	Stacy, Minnesota	Chicago Steel (USHL)	TBL, 193rd overall 2023
14	(United States)	Mick Frechette	Junior	D	6' 2" (1.88 m)	205 lb (93 kg)	2003-10-27	Weston, Massachusetts	Dexter Southfield School (USHS–MA)	—
15	(United States)	Carter Amico	Freshman	D	6' 5" (1.96 m)	225 lb (102 kg)	2007-03-15	Westbrook, Maine	USNTDP (USHL)	PHI, 38th overall 2025
16	(United States)	Conrad Fondrk	Freshman	F	6' 0" (1.83 m)	203 lb (92 kg)	2007-06-01	Saint Paul, Minnesota	USNTDP (USHL)	NJD, 50th overall 2025
18	(United States)	Jay Feldberg	Freshman	F	6' 0" (1.83 m)	185 lb (84 kg)	2006-02-21	Toronto, Ontario	Toronto Jr. Canadiens (OJHL)	—
19	(United States)	Jack Murtagh	Freshman	F	6' 1" (1.85 m)	198 lb (90 kg)	2007-08-22	East Greenbush, New York	USNTDP (USHL)	PHI, 40th overall 2025
21	(Canada)	Ryder Ritchie	Freshman	F	6' 2" (1.88 m)	190 lb (86 kg)	2006-08-03	Calgary, Alberta	Medicine Hat Tigers (WHL)	MIN, 45th overall 2024
22	(Canada)	Aiden Celebrini	Junior	F	6' 1" (1.85 m)	195 lb (88 kg)	2004-10-26	Vancouver, British Columbia	Brooks Bandits (AJHL)	VAN, 171st overall 2023
23	(United States)	Owen McLaughlin	Senior	F	6' 0" (1.83 m)	178 lb (81 kg)	2003-03-25	Spring City, Pennsylvania	North Dakota (NCHC)	PHI, 206th overall 2021
25	(United States)	Ben Merrill	Freshman	F	6' 4" (1.93 m)	205 lb (93 kg)	2005-11-04	Hingham, Massachusetts	Penticton Vees (BCHL)	MTL, 166th overall 2024
26	(United States)	John McNelis	Freshman	F	5' 10" (1.78 m)	165 lb (75 kg)	2006-01-08	Potomac, Maryland	Cedar Rapids RoughRiders (USHL)	—
27	(United States)	Kyle Kim	Freshman	D	6' 2" (1.88 m)	181 lb (82 kg)	2005-01-06	Northville, Michigan	New Jersey Titans (NAHL)	—
33	(United States)	Max Lacroix	Junior	G	6' 0" (1.83 m)	170 lb (77 kg)	2003-12-13	Castle Pines, Colorado	Colorado Grit (NAHL)	—
34	(United States)	Cole Eiserman	Sophomore	F	6' 0" (1.83 m)	196 lb (89 kg)	2006-08-29	Newburyport, Massachusetts	USNTDP (USHL)	NYI, 20th overall 2024
38	(United States)	Kamil Bednarik	Sophomore	F	6' 0" (1.83 m)	185 lb (84 kg)	2006-05-26	Elk Grove Village, Illinois	USNTDP (USHL)	NYI, 61st overall 2024
40	(Russia)	Mikhail Yegorov	Sophomore	G	6' 5" (1.96 m)	187 lb (85 kg)	2006-03-07	St. Petersburg, Russia	Omaha Lancers (USHL)	NJD, 49th overall 2024
44	(United States)	Cole Hutson	Sophomore	D	5' 10" (1.78 m)	165 lb (75 kg)	2006-06-28	North Barrington, Illinois	USNTDP (USHL)	WSH, 43rd overall 2024
57	(Sweden)	Malte Vass	Freshman	D	6' 3" (1.91 m)	194 lb (88 kg)	2007-03-28	Karlstad, Sweden	Färjestad BK J20 (J20 Nationell)	CBJ, 76th overall 2025
78	(Sweden)	Sascha Boumedienne	Sophomore	D	6' 2" (1.88 m)	183 lb (83 kg)	2007-01-17	Oulu, Finland	Youngstown Phantoms (USHL)	WPG, 28th overall 2025
91	(United States)	Charlie Trethewey	Freshman	D	6' 2" (1.88 m)	201 lb (91 kg)	2007-08-02	Ellicott City, Maryland	USNTDP (USHL)	PIT, 73rd overall 2025

== Championships ==
NCAA Tournament championships

Tournament	Record	Score	Opponent	City	Arena
1971	28–2–1	4–2	Minnesota	Syracuse, New York	Onondaga War Memorial
1972	26–4–1	4–0	Cornell	Boston, Massachusetts	Boston Garden
1978	30–2–0	5–3	Boston College	Providence, Rhode Island	Providence Civic Center
1995	31–6–3	6–2	Maine	Providence, Rhode Island	Providence Civic Center
2009	35–6–4	4–3 (OT)	Miami University	Washington, D.C.	Verizon Center

The Terriers have won five national championships, and are the only eastern team to win back-to-back NCAA titles. Under head coach Jack Kelley, they won their first title in 1971 and repeated in 1972. BU won their other three titles under head coach Jack Parker, in 1978, 1995, and 2009. In 1972, 1995, and 2009, BU won the "triple crown," consisting of the Beanpot, conference tournament, and NCAA championships. In 1995 and 2009, the Terriers also won the Hockey East regular season title, giving the team four major trophies in a single season. The Terriers have 40 NCAA Tournament appearances, 25 Frozen Four appearances, and have finished as the NCAA Tournament runners-up on seven occasions: 1950, 1967, 1991, 1994, 1997, 2015, 2025.

Conference tournament championships

Tournament	Conference	Score	Opponent
1951	NEIHL	4–1	Boston College
1952	NEIHL	3–1	Brown
1972	ECAC	4–1	Cornell
1974	ECAC	4–2	Harvard
1975	ECAC	7–3	Harvard
1976	ECAC	9–2	Brown
1977	ECAC	8–6	New Hampshire
1986	Hockey East	9–4	Boston College
1991	Hockey East	4–3 (OT)	Maine
1994	Hockey East	3–2	UMass Lowell
1995	Hockey East	3–2	Providence
1997	Hockey East	4–2	New Hampshire
2006	Hockey East	2–1 (OT)	Boston College
2009	Hockey East	1–0	UMass Lowell
2015	Hockey East	5–3	UMass Lowell
2018	Hockey East	2–0	Providence
2023	Hockey East	3–2 (OT)	Merrimack

Conference regular season championships

Season	Conference	Conference Record
1938	NEIHL	5–1–2
1939	NEIHL	6–0–0
1947	NEIHL	11–0–1
1948	NEIHL	12–1–0
1950	NEIHL	8–1–0
1965	ECAC	15–3–0
1967	ECAC	19–0–1
1971	ECAC	18–1–1
1976	ECAC	21–2–0
1978	ECAC	21–1–0
1979	ECAC	17–4–2
1994	Hockey East	21–3–4
1995	Hockey East	16–5–3
1996	Hockey East	17–5–2
1997	Hockey East	16–4–4
1998	Hockey East	18–4–2
2000	Hockey East	15–3–6
2006	Hockey East	17–7–3
2009	Hockey East	13–10–1
2015	Hockey East	14–5–3
2017	Hockey East	13–6–3
2023	Hockey East	20–8–0

From 1936-1954, BU was a founding member of the New England Intercollegiate Hockey League, winning five regular season titles and two tournament championships. In 1961, BU was again a founding member of a conference, this time for the Eastern College Athletic Conference (ECAC). BU would win six regular season titles and five tournament championships in the ECAC before departing in 1984 to help form the Hockey East Association. BU has competed in Hockey East since the 1984–85 season, winning eleven regular season titles and ten tournament championships.

In-season tournament and event championships

- Beanpot (32 times champion): 1958, 1966, 1967, 1968, 1970, 1971, 1972, 1973, 1975, 1978, 1979, 1982, 1986, 1987, 1990, 1991, 1992, 1995, 1996, 1997, 1998, 1999, 2000, 2002, 2003, 2005, 2006, 2007, 2009, 2015, 2022, 2025
- Red Hot Hockey, Kelley-Harkness Cup (4): 2007, 2011, 2013, 2025
- Friendship Four (1): 2024
- Ice Breaker Tournament (3): 2002, 2008, 2010
- Denver Cup (1): 2008
- Great Lakes Invitational (1): 2002
- Johnson Nissan Classic (1): 1999
- Badger Showdown (2): 1992, 1995
- Mariucci Classic (1): 1994
- Auld Lang Syne Tournament (1): 1991
- Syracuse Invitational Tournament (1): 1982
- Colonial Bank Hockey Invitational (1): 1980
- ECAC Holiday Hockey Festival (2): 1966, 1977
- St. Louis Fireman’s Tournament (1): 1974
- ECAC Christmas Hockey Tournament (1): 1971
- Boston Arena Christmas Tournament (5): 1957, 1967, 1968, 1969, 1970
- New Brunswick Invitational (1): 1968
- Boston Garden Christmas Hockey Festival (1): 1964

== Beanpot results ==
Boston University is sometimes jokingly referred to as "Beanpot University" because of its success in the annual mid-season hockey tournament called the Beanpot. This highly anticipated single-elimination tournament is contested by Boston University, Northeastern University, Harvard University, and Boston College, with the winner receiving the coveted Beanpot trophy and bragging rights over its Boston rivals. The four-team tournament is played on the first two Mondays of February at the TD Garden. Of the 63 Beanpots played since the 1952–1953 season, Boston University has been victorious on 32 occasions. The Terriers' last win came in 2025 as they defeated Boston College 4-1 in the final round.

== BU Terriers in the Olympics ==
=== BU Terriers on the 1980 U.S. Olympic Hockey team ===
The' Miracle on Ice' team that defeated the Soviet Union and won the gold medal during the 1980 Olympics in Lake Placid, New York, featured four Boston University players including Olympic team captain Mike Eruzione. Along with Dave Silk, Jack O'Callahan, and goalie Jim Craig, these Terriers played key roles and were the only players from eastern schools on a U.S. squad composed predominantly of Minnesotans.

Eruzione scored the famous winning goal against the Soviets with 10 minutes remaining, and Craig made 36 saves to preserve the 4–3 victory. Silk, who assisted on the United States' second and third goals, was mentioned in sportscast Al Michaels' final call: "Eleven seconds, you've got ten seconds, the countdown going on right now! Morrow, up to Silk. Five seconds left in the game. Do you believe in miracles? Yes!"

O'Callahan, who had injured his left knee in an exhibition match, returned for the famous "Miracle on Ice" game and in his first seconds on the ice, delivered a massive hit on a Soviet player that turned the puck over to the Americans near the Soviet defensive zone. The hit caught the Soviets off guard and set up a goal scored by William "Buzz" Schneider to tie the game at 1–1.

After defeating the Soviet Union squad, the U.S. players went on to defeat Finland to secure the gold medal.

=== Boston University Olympians ===
This is a list of Boston University alumni who have played on an Olympic team.

Name	Position	BU Tenure	Team	Year	Finish
Gordon Smith	Forward		(United States) USA	1932, 1936	Silver, Bronze
Paul Rowe	Forward	1932–1935	(United States) USA	1936	Bronze
John Lax	Forward	1932–1935	(United States) USA	1936	Bronze
Jack Garrity	Forward	1949–1951	(United States) USA	1948	DQ
Joseph Czarnota	Forward	1948–1951	(United States) USA	1952	Silver
Don Rigazio	Goaltender		(United States) USA	1956	Silver
Richard Rodenhiser	Forward	1951–1953	(United States) USA	1956, 1960	Silver, Gold
Olivier Prechac	Forward	1970–1971	France	1968	11th
Tim Regan	Goaltender	1969–1972	(United States) USA	1972	Silver
Herb Wakabayashi	Forward	1966–1969	Japan	1972, 1976, 1980	9th, 9th, 12th
Dick Lamby	Defenseman	1976–1978	(United States) USA	1976	5th
Dick Decloe	Defenseman	1972–1973	Netherlands	1980	9th
Mike Eruzione	Left Wing	1973–1977	(United States) USA	1980	Gold
Jim Craig	Goaltender	1976–1979	(United States) USA	1980	Gold
Jack O'Callahan	Defenseman	1975–1979	(United States) USA	1980	Gold
Dave Silk	Right Wing	1976–1979	(United States) USA	1980	Gold
Grant Goegan	Left Wing	1978–1980	Italy	1984	9th
Scott Young	Right Wing	1985–1987	(United States) USA	1988, 1992, 2002	7th, 4th, Silver
Clark Donatelli	Center	1984–1987	(United States) USA	1988, 1992	7th, 4th
Scott Lachance	Defenseman	1990–1991	(United States) USA	1992	4th
Shawn McEachern	Left Wing	1988–1991	(United States) USA	1992	4th
Joe Sacco	Right Wing	1987–1990	(United States) USA	1992	4th
Keith Tkachuk	Right Wing	1990–1991	(United States) USA	1992, 1998, 2002, 2006	4th, 6th, Silver, 8th
David Quinn	Defenseman	1984–1988	(United States) USA	1992	†
Adrian Aucoin	Defenseman	1991–1992	Canada	1994	Silver
John Lilley	Right Wing	1991–1993	(United States) USA	1994	4th
David Sacco	Center	1988–1993	(United States) USA	1994	8th
Tony Amonte	Right Wing	1989–1991	(United States) USA	1998, 2002	6th, Silver
Chris Drury	Left Wing	1994–1998	(United States) USA	2002, 2006, 2010	Silver, 8th, Silver
Tom Poti	Defenseman	1996–1998	(United States) USA	2002	Silver
Rick DiPietro	Goaltender	1999–2000	(United States) USA	2006	8th
Ryan Whitney	Defenseman	2001–2004	(United States) USA	2010	Silver
Kevin Shattenkirk	Defenseman	2007–2010	(United States) USA	2014	4th
Chris Bourque	Left Wing	2004–2005	(United States) USA	2018	7th
Jordan Greenway	Left Wing	2015–2018	(United States) USA	2018	7th
Matt Gilroy	Defenseman	2005–2009	(United States) USA	2018	7th
John McCarthy	Left Wing	2005–2009	(United States) USA	2018	7th
David Warsofsky	Defenseman	2008–2011	(United States) USA	2022	5th
Drew Commesso	Goaltender	2020–Present	(United States) USA	2022	5th
Brandon Yip	Right Wing	2005–2009	China	2022	12th
Macklin Celebrini	Center	2023–2024	Canada	2026	Silver
Mike Sullivan	Head Coach	1986–1990	(United States) USA	2026	Gold
Jack Eichel	Center	2014–2015	(United States) USA	2026	Gold
Clayton Keller	Right Wing	2016–2017	(United States) USA	2026	Gold
Charlie McAvoy	Defenseman	2015–2017	(United States) USA	2026	Gold
Brady Tkachuk	Left Wing	2017–2018	(United States) USA	2026	Gold
Jake Oettinger	Goalie	2016–2019	(United States) USA	2026	Gold

† cut from team before Olympics.

== Rivals ==
=== Boston College ===
Boston University's biggest rival is Boston College. Referred to as the Green Line Rivalry or The Battle of Commonwealth Avenue because of the proximity of the schools and the means of transportation to get from one campus to another, the Terriers and Eagles have played each other well over 200 times since their first meeting in 1918. The rivalry is considered one of the best in NCAA hockey, both in terms of intensity and quality. The schools have combined for ten national championships and even played each other in the NCAA championship game in 1978, with BU skating off to a 5–3 victory.

After the 1978 national championship victory over Boston College, BU co-captain Jack O'Callahan was quoted as saying "We shouldn't have to beat BC for the nationals. Hell, we can do that anytime." But every game between the teams is highly anticipated. "You could wake up both teams at three o'clock in the morning and tell 'em we're playing on Spy Pond in Arlington, and they'd be there," BU coach Jack Parker once said.

BU and BC have played at least once a year since 1946, and at least twice a year since 1949. They usually play two Hockey East regular season games each year, and typically face each other once more in February during the Beanpot, with BU holding a substantial edge in tournament and head-to-head victories. The teams have twice played each other for the Hockey East Championship, in 1986 and 2006, with BU winning both titles. In 2005–06, BU and BC played six games—three in the Hockey East regular season, and once each in the Beanpot, Hockey East tournament, and NCAA tournament. At every game, regular season and playoffs, the spirited student sections – BU's nicknamed the Dog Pound and BC's the Superfans – are seated in proximity to each other and hurl insults and chants back and forth. BU and BC ratcheted up their rivalry on Jan. 8, 2010, when they played each other at Fenway Park in front of 38,000 fans, the biggest crowd to ever watch the teams play. BU won the game, 3–2.

Sports Illustrated columnist Steve Rushin went so far as to call BU-BC the biggest rivalry in all of sports. Despite substantial bitterness between the fan bases of the two schools, the hockey teams and coaches generally agree that the magnitude of the rivalry has benefited both hockey programs. "The best thing that ever happened to BU hockey was BC," Parker told Rushin.

The first varsity ice hockey game BU ever played was a 3–1 loss to Boston College on February 6, 1918. As of the 2010–11 season, BU led the all-time rivalry 125–112, with 17 ties.

=== Cornell ===
The rivalry between Boston University and Cornell dates to 1925 when Boston University beat Cornell 7–2. The teams played each other in the NCAA championship game in both 1967 and 1972, with Cornell defeating BU 4–1 in '67 and the Terriers taking the '72 title with a 4–0 win. Between the years 1967 and 1977, Boston University and Cornell won the ECAC crown five times each.

The schools renewed the rivalry over Thanksgiving weekend of 2007, with a sold out game dubbed "Red Hot Hockey" at Madison Square Garden in New York, NY. After scoring three goals in the first several minutes of play, BU went on to win 6–3. Red Hot Hockey returned to Madison Square Garden on November 28, 2009, with the two teams skating to a 3–3 tie after one overtime period. The event again sold out the arena. The third meet up on November 26, 2011, resulted in a 2–1 win for BU in overtime.

=== University of Maine ===
In the first half of the 1990s, the BU–Maine rivalry was one of the most talked about in college hockey, with the teams battling each other both for eastern and national college hockey supremacy. Boston University defeated Maine in the 1991 Hockey East championship game, in overtime, and Maine returned the favor by soundly beating BU in the HE title game in 1993. In the '93 season, Maine won the national title and lost only one game all year, and it came at the hands of their rivals at BU. Maine had to forfeit most of its wins in the 1994 season because of recruiting violations. BU coach Jack Parker criticized the Maine program, calling the use of ineligible players a "black mark on the league." In 1995, both teams were at the top of their games and faced off in the NCAA championship game in Providence, R.I., which BU won 6–2.

=== Harvard and Northeastern ===
BU's rivalries with Harvard and Northeastern stem mainly from regular meetings in the Beanpot, the tournament in which Boston bragging rights are on the line. BU also plays Northeastern three times each year in conference regular season play, and sometimes plays the ECAC-based Harvard in a non-conference game early in the season. BU, BC, Northeastern and Harvard formerly played their home games in the Boston Arena, the site of the first Beanpot in 1952 and the current home of Northeastern. BU stopped playing home games in Boston Arena when it opened the Walter Brown Arena in 1971.

== Awards and honors ==
=== Hockey Hall of Fame ===
In 2025, Jack Parker became the first Terrier to be inducted in the Hockey Hall of Fame, inducted in the builder category. One year later, Keith Tkachuk became the first Terrier to be inducted into the Hockey Hall of Fame in the player category, as part of the 2026 class.

Individual	Category	Year Inducted	Years with Terriers in Category	References
Jack Parker	Builder	2025	1973-2013	
Keith Tkachuk	Player	2026	1990-1991	

=== Hobey Baker Award winners ===
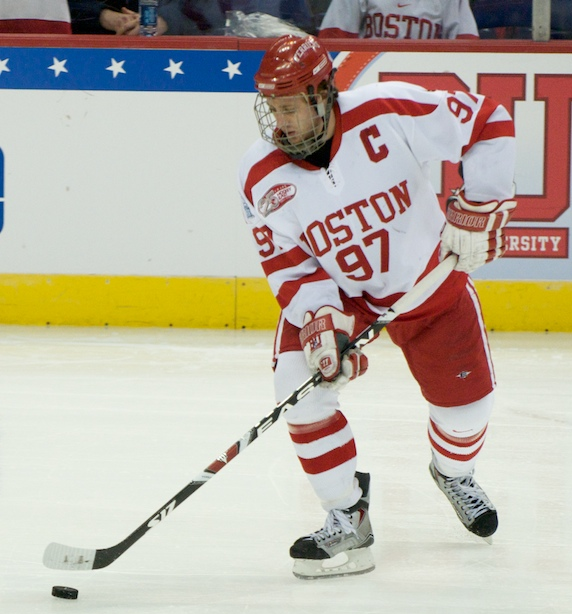
2009 Hobey Baker winner Matt Gilroy

The Hobey Baker Award is an annual award given to the top National Collegiate Athletic Association men's ice hockey player. It is named for hockey player and World War I hero Hobey Baker.

Hobey Baker Award Winners	Year
Chris Drury	1998
Matt Gilroy	2009
Jack Eichel	2015
Macklin Celebrini	2024

Forward Chris Drury became BU's first Hobey Baker award winner after a senior campaign in which he scored 28 goals and assisted on 29 more. Drury's 113 career goals are the most in BU history. Drury has gone on to a successful NHL career, which included the 1999 rookie of the year award and a 2001 Stanley Cup championship with Colorado. After captaining BU as a senior, Drury has also worn the captain's "C" for both the Buffalo Sabres and New York Rangers.

Defenseman Matt Gilroy won BU's second Hobey Baker award after a senior season in which he scored eight goals and posted 29 assists. Gilroy came to BU as a walk-on and became a three-time All-American. After winning the Hobey and national championship, Gilroy signed a two-year contract with the New York Rangers.

Forward Jack Eichel won the Hobey Baker in 2015, after putting a 71-point year in only 40 games, becoming the third BU player to win the award. He edged the two others nominees that year, Zane McIntyre from North Dakota, and Jimmy Vesey from Harvard University. Vesey went on and won it the year after. Following his stellar first year in BU, Eichel went on to be drafted second overall by the Buffalo Sabres, and would sign his entry-level contract after, putting an end to his short NCAA career.

Forward Macklin Celebrini won the Hobey Baker award in 2024, after recording 38 goals and 32 assists in 38 games, becoming the fourth BU player to win the award. At 17, he became the youngest player to win the award and the fourth freshman, following Paul Kariya in 1993, Jack Eichel in 2015 and Adam Fantilli in 2023.

=== Other awards ===
USA Hockey College Player of the Year (Jim Johannson Award)

- Chris Drury: 1997, 1998
- Colin Wilson: 2009
- Jack Eichel: 2015

Walter Brown Award (Best American-born Div. 1 player in New England)

- Ed Walsh: 1973
- Cleon Daskalakis: 1984
- David Sacco: 1993
- Jacques Joubert: 1994
- Mike Grier: 1995
- Jay Pandolfo: 1996
- Chris Drury: 1997, 1998
- John Curry: 2007
- Matt Gilroy: 2009
- Lane Hutson: 2023

=== NCAA ===
==== Individual awards ====
Tim Taylor Award

- Kieran Millan: 2009
- Jack Eichel: 2015
- Clayton Keller: 2017
- Joel Farabee: 2019
- Macklin Celebrini: 2024

NCAA Scoring Champion

- Jack Garrity: 1950
- Herb Wakabayashi: 1967
- Jack Eichel: 2015

Spencer Penrose Award

- Harry Cleverly: 1958
- Jack Parker: 1975, 1978, 2009

NCAA Tournament Most Outstanding Player

- Ralph Bevins: 1950
- Bob Marquis: 1960
- Barry Urbanski: 1960
- Dan Brady: 1971
- Tim Regan: 1972
- Jack O'Callahan: 1978
- Chris O'Sullivan: 1995
- Colby Cohen: 2009

==== All-American teams ====
First Team

- 1949–50: Ralph Bevins, G; Jack Garrity, F
- 1950–51: Jack Garrity, F
- 1952–53: Richard Rodenhiser, F
- 1957–58: Bob Dupuis, D; Don MacLeod, D; Bob Marquis, F
- 1958–59: Bob Marquis, F
- 1963–64: Richie Green, D
- 1964–65: Jack Ferreira, G; Tom Ross, D
- 1965–66: Tom Ross, D; Fred Bassi, F
- 1966–67: Brian Gilmour, D
- 1967–68: Herb Wakabayashi, F
- 1968–69: Herb Wakabayashi, F
- 1969–70: Mike Hyndman, D
- 1970–71: Bob Brown, D; Steve Stirling, F
- 1971–72: Dan Brady, G; Bob Brown, D; John Danby, F
- 1972–73: Ed Walsh, G; Steve Dolloff, F
- 1973–74: Vic Stanfield, D; Bill Burlington, F
- 1974–75: Vic Stanfield, D; Rick Meagher, F
- 1975–76: Peter Brown, D; Rick Meagher, F
- 1976–77: Rick Meagher, F
- 1978–79: Jim Craig, G; Jack O'Callahan, D
- 1983–84: Cleon Daskalakis, G
- 1990–91: Shawn McEachern, F
- 1991–92: David Sacco, F
- 1992–93: David Sacco, F
- 1993–94: Mike Pomichter, F
- 1994–95: Mike Grier, F
- 1995–96: Jay Pandolfo, F
- 1996–97: Jon Coleman, D; Chris Drury, F
- 1997–98: Tom Poti, D; Chris Drury, F
- 2002–03: Freddy Meyer, D
- 2005–06: Dan Spang, D
- 2006–07: John Curry, G
- 2007–08: Matt Gilroy, D
- 2008–09: Matt Gilroy, D; Colin Wilson, F
- 2009–10: Colby Cohen, D
- 2014–15: Matt Grzelcyk, D; Jack Eichel, F
- 2015–16: Matt Grzelcyk, D
- 2016–17: Charlie McAvoy, D
- 2019–20: David Farrance, D
- 2020–21: David Farrance, D
- 2022–23: Lane Hutson, D
- 2023–24: Lane Hutson, D; Macklin Celebrini, F
- 2024–25: Cole Hutson, D
- 2025–26: Cole Hutson, D

Second Team

- 1983–84: T. J. Connolly, D
- 1985–86: Jay Octeau, D; John Cullen, F; Clark Donatelli, F
- 1991–92: Tom Dion, D
- 1992–93: Kaj Linna, D
- 1993–94: J. P. McKersie, G; Rich Brennan, D; Jacques Joubert, F
- 1994–95: Kaj Linna, D; Chris O'Sullivan, F
- 1995–96: Jon Coleman, D; Chris Drury, F
- 1996–97: Chris Kelleher, D
- 1997–98: Chris Kelleher, D
- 1998–99: Michel Larocque, G
- 1999-00: Chris Dyment, D
- 2000–01: Carl Corazzini, D
- 2001–02: Chris Dyment, D
- 2005–06: John Curry, G
- 2006–07: Matt Gilroy, D; Sean Sullivan, D
- 2007–08: Bryan Ewing, F; Pete MacArthur, F
- 2008–09: Kevin Shattenkirk, D
- 2015–16: Danny O'Regan, F
- 2022–23: Matt Brown, F

=== ECAC Hockey ===
==== Individual awards ====
ECAC Hockey Player of the Year

- Bob Brown: 1972
- Peter Brown: 1976
- Cleon Daskalakis: 1984

ECAC Hockey Rookie of the Year

- Richie Green: 1963
- Herb Wakabayashi: 1967
- Mike Hyndman: 1968
- Bob Brown: 1971
- Vic Stanfield: 1973
- Mark Fidler: 1978
- Bill Whelton: 1979
- John Cullen: 1984

ECAC Hockey Outstanding Defenseman

- Richie Green: 1964
- Tom Ross: 1965

ECAC Hockey Most Outstanding Player in Tournament

- John Danby: 1972
- Ed Walsh: 1974
- Rick Meagher: 1975, 1977
- Terry Meagher: 1976

==== All-ECAC Hockey ====
First Team

- 1961–62: Glen Eberly, G
- 1963–64: Richie Green, D
- 1964–65: Jack Ferreira, G; Tom Ross, D
- 1965–66: Jack Ferreira, G; Peter McLachlan, D; Bruce Fennie, F; Fred Bassi, F
- 1966–67: Peter McLachlan, D
- 1968–69: Herb Wakabayashi, F
- 1969–70: Mike Hyndman, D
- 1970–71: Bob Brown, D; John Danby, F; Steve Stirling, F
- 1971–72: Dan Brady, G; Bob Brown, D
- 1972–73: Vic Stanfield, D
- 1973–74: Ed Walsh, G; Vic Stanfield, D; Bill Burlington, F
- 1974–75: Brian Durocher, G; Vic Stanfield, D; Mike Eruzione, F
- 1975–76: Peter Brown, D; Rick Meagher, F; Mike Eruzione, F
- 1976–77: Rick Meagher, F
- 1977–78: Jack O'Callahan, D
- 1978–79: Jim Craig, G; Jack O'Callahan, D
- 1983–84: Cleon Daskalakis, G; T. J. Connolly, D

Second Team

- 1962–63: Richie Green, D; Mike Denihan, F
- 1963–64: Jack Ferreira, G; Bruce Fennie, F
- 1965–66: Tom Ross, D
- 1966–67: Wayne Ryan, G; Brian Gilmour, D
- 1967–68: Mike Hyndman, F; Herb Wakabayashi, F
- 1968–69: Mike Hyndman, F
- 1970–71: John Jordan, D
- 1971–72: Ric Jordan, D; John Danby, F
- 1972–73: Steve Dolloff, F; Dave Wisener, F
- 1973–74: Peter Brown, D; Rick Meagher, F
- 1974–75: Peter Brown, D; Rick Meagher, F
- 1976–77: Mike Eruzione, F
- 1977–78: Dick Lamby, D; Dave Silk, F
- 1982–83: Cleon Daskalakis, G

=== Hockey East ===
==== Individual awards ====
Hockey East Player of the Year

- Jay Pandolfo: 1996
- Chris Drury: 1997, 1998
- John Curry: 2007
- Jack Eichel: 2015
- Macklin Celebrini: 2024

Bob Kullen Coach of the Year

- Jack Parker: 1986, 1992, 2000, 2005, 2006
- David Quinn: 2015
- Jay Pandolfo:2023

Len Ceglarski Award

- Steve Thornton: 1995
- Chris Higgins: 2008
- Chris Connolly: 2012

Hockey East Best Defensive Defenseman

- Chris Dyment: 2002
- Sean Sullivan: 2007
- Cade Webber: 2024

Hockey East Best Defensive Forward

- Chris Drury: 1998
- Mike Pandolfo: 2002
- Mark Mullen: 2003
- Brad Zancanaro: 2006
- Chris Connolly: 2012
- Patrick Curry: 2020

Hockey East Scoring Champion

- Mike Pomichter: 1994
- Chris Drury: 1997, 1998
- Bryan Ewing: 2008
- Colin Wilson: 2009
- Jack Eichel: 2015
- Lane Hutson: 2023
- Macklin Celebrini: 2024

Hockey East Three-Stars Award

- John Curry: 2007
- Bryan Ewing: 2008
- Kieran Millan: 2012
- Jack Eichel: 2015
- Clayton Keller: 2017
- Lane Hutson: 2023
- Macklin Celebrini: 2024

Hockey East Goaltending Champion

- Derek Heriofsky: 1992, 1994
- Tom Noble: 1996
- Michel Larocque: 1997, 1998
- John Curry: 2007

Hockey East Rookie of the Year

- Scott Young: 1986
- Scott Cashman: 1980
- Rick DiPietro: 2000
- Brandon Yip: 2006
- Colin Wilson: 2008
- Kieran Millan: 2009
- Charlie Coyle: 2011
- Jack Eichel: 2015
- Clayton Keller: 2017
- Joel Farabee: 2019
- Lane Hutson: 2023
- Macklin Celebrini: 2024
- Lane Hutson: 2025

William Flynn Tournament Most Valuable Player

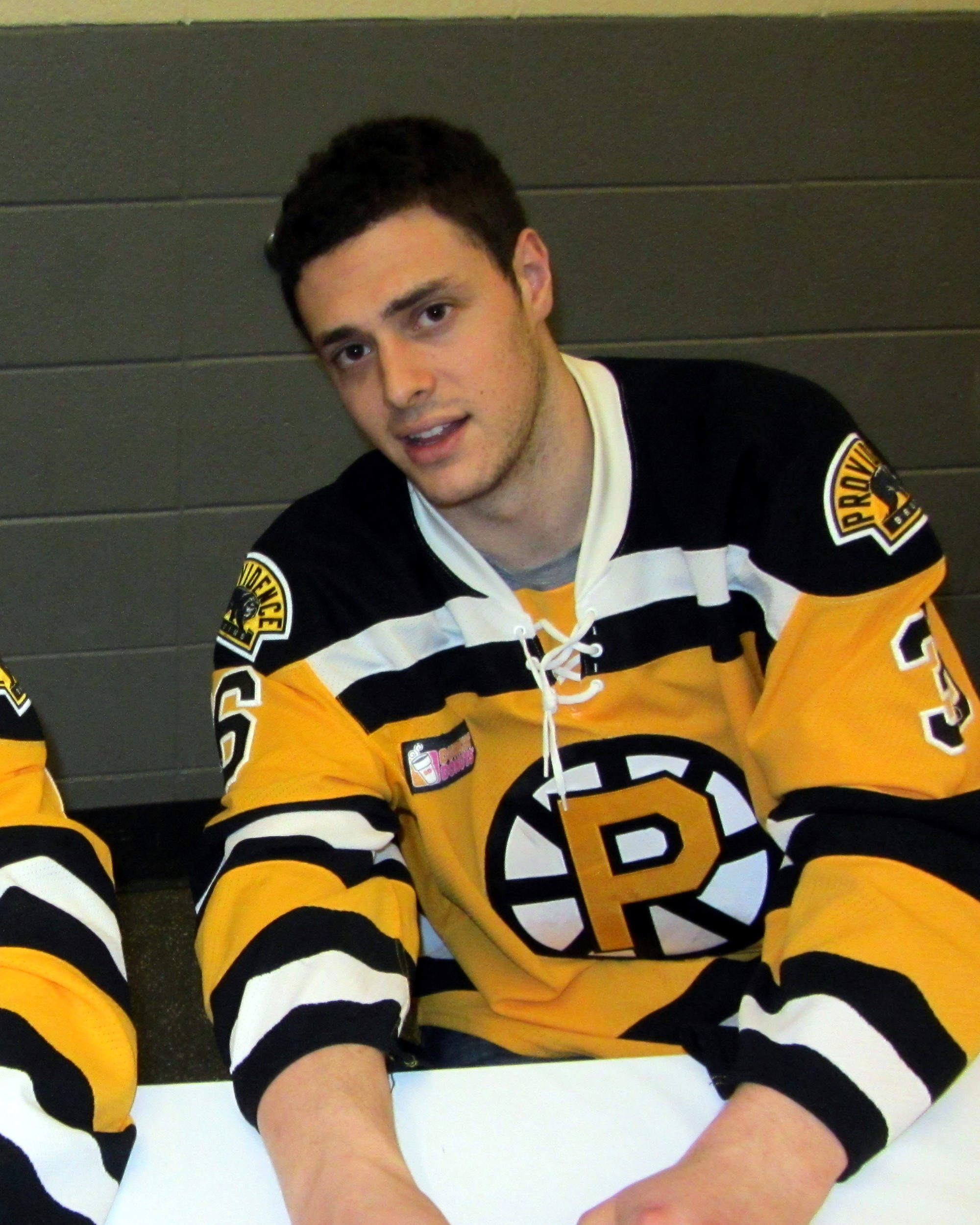
Colby Cohen

- Peter Marshall: 1986
- Shawn McEachern: 1991
- Michel Larocque: 1997
- Sean Fields: 2003
- David Van der Gulik: 2006
- Kieran Millan: 2009
- Jack Eichel: 2015
- Jake Oettinger: 2018
- Lane Hutson: 2023

==== All-Hockey East ====
First Team

- 1984–85: John Cullen, F
- 1985–86: Scott Shaunessy, D; David Quinn, D; John Cullen, F
- 1990–91: Shawn McEachern, F
- 1991–92: Tom Dion, D; David Sacco, F
- 1992–93: Kevin O'Sullivan, D; David Sacco, F
- 1993–94: Rich Brennan, D; Jacques Joubert, F
- 1994–95 †: Kaj Linna, D; Mike Grier, F; Chris O'Sullivan, F
- 1995–96 †: Jon Coleman, D; Chris Drury, F; Jay Pandolfo, F
- 1996–97 †: Tom Noble, G; Jon Coleman, D; Chris Drury, F
- 1997–98: Tom Poti, D; Chris Drury, F
- 1998–99: Michel Larocque, G
- 1999–00: Chris Dyment, D
- 2000–01: Carl Corazzini, F
- 2002–03: Freddy Meyer, D
- 2004–05: Bryan Miller, D
- 2005–06: John Curry, G; Dan Spang, D
- 2006–07: John Curry, G; Sean Sullivan, D; Matt Gilroy, D
- 2007–08: Matt Gilroy, D; Bryan Ewing, F; Pete MacArthur, F
- 2008–09: Matt Gilroy, D; Colin Wilson, F
- 2009–10: Matt Gilroy, D
- 2011–12: Adam Clendening, D
- 2014–15: Matt Grzelcyk, D; Jack Eichel, F
- 2015–16: Matt Grzelcyk, D; Danny O'Regan, F
- 2016–17: Charlie McAvoy, D
- 2019–20: David Farrance, D
- 2020–21: David Farrance, D
- 2022–23: Domenick Fensore, D; Lane Hutson, D; Matt Brown, F
- 2023–24: Lane Hutson, D; Macklin Celebrini, F
- 2024-25: Cole Hutson, D
- 2025-26: Cole Hutson, D

Second Team

- 1984–85: Scott Shaunessy, D
- 1985–86: Terry Taillefer, G; Clark Donatelli, D
- 1986–87: John Cullen, F
- 1987–88: Mike Kelfer, F
- 1988–89: Mike Kelfer, F
- 1989–90: Scott Cashman, G; Shawn McEachern, F
- 1990–91: Tony Amonte, F
- 1991–92: Kevin O'Sullivan, D
- 1992–93: Kaj Linna, D
- 1993–94: Derek Herlofsky, G; Scott Malone, D; Mike Latendresse, F
- 1997–98: Michel Larocque, G; Chris Kelleher, D
- 1999–00: Rick DiPietro, G; Pat Aufiero, D
- 2001–02: Chris Dyment, D
- 2004–05: John Curry, G
- 2005–06: Pete MacArthur, F
- 2006–07: Pete MacArthur, F
- 2008–09: Kieran Millan, G; Kevin Shattenkirk, D
- 2010–11: Kieran Millan, G; David Warsofsky, D
- 2011–12: Garrett Noonan, D; Chris Connolly, F
- 2012–13: Evan Rodrigues, F
- 2014–15: Matt O'Connor, D; Danny O'Regan, F; Evan Rodrigues, F
- 2016–17: Jake Oettinger, G; Clayton Keller, F
- 2017–18: Dante Fabbro, D; Bobo Carpenter, F
- 2018–19: Dante Fabbro, D
- 2021–22: Domenick Fensore, D; Wilmer Skoog, F
- 2023–24: Tom Willander, D
- 2024–25: Quinn Hutson, F; Tom Willander, D

Third Team

- 2017–18: Jordan Greenway, F
- 2019–20: Patrick Harper, F; Trevor Zegras, F
- 2022–23: Wilmer Skoog, F
- 2023–24: Mathieu Caron, G
- 2024-25: Ryan Greene, F
- 2025-26: Gavin McCarthy, D

All-Rookie Team

- 1984–85: Clark Donatelli, F
- 1987–88: Tom Dion, D
- 1989–90: Scott Cashman, G; Peter Ahola, D; Tony Amonte, F
- 1990–91: Scott Lachance, D; Keith Tkachuk, F
- 1991–92: Rich Brennan, D; John Lilley, F; Mike Pendergast, F
- 1993–94: Shawn Bates, F
- 1994–95: Chris Kelleher, D
- 1995–96: Michel Larocque, G
- 1996–97: Tom Poti, D
- 1997–98: Carl Corazzini, F
- 1999–00: Rick DiPietro, G; Freddy Meyer, D; Brian Collins, F
- 2001–02: Ryan Whitney, D; Brian McConnell, F
- 2002–03: Jēkabs Rēdlihs, D; David Van der Gulik, F
- 2003–04: Kevin Schaeffer, D
- 2004–05: Chris Bourque, F; Pete MacArthur, F
- 2005–06: Brandon Yip, F
- 2007–08: Kevin Shattenkirk, D; Colin Wilson, F
- 2008–09: Kieran Millan, G; Chris Connolly, D
- 2009–10: Max Nicastro, D
- 2010–11: Adam Clendening, D; Charlie Coyle, F
- 2011–12: Alexx Privitera, D
- 2012–13: Matt Grzelcyk, D; Danny O'Regan, F
- 2013–14: Robbie Bailargeon, F
- 2014–15: Jack Eichel, F
- 2015–16: Charlie McAvoy, D; Jakob Forsbacka Karlsson, F
- 2016–17: Jake Oettinger, G; Patrick Harper, F; Clayton Keller, F
- 2017–18: Shane Bowers, F; Brady Tkachuk, F
- 2018–19: Joel Farabee, F
- 2019-20: Trevor Zegras,F
- 2020-21: Drew Commesso, G; Luke Tuch, F
- 2021–22: Ty Gallagher, F
- 2022–23: Lane Hutson, D; Ryan Greene, F
- 2023–24: Macklin Celebrini, F
- 2024–25: Cole Hutson, D; Cole Eiserman, F

† Hockey East made no distinction between first- and second-team all-conference teams from 1994–95 to 1996–97.

== Travis Roy ==
On Oct. 20, 1995, BU raised its fourth national championship banner as it opened a new season, yet just moments later the program suffered its greatest on-ice tragedy. On that night Travis Roy, a freshman recruit who grew up in Maine, was paralyzed from the neck down just eleven seconds into his first college shift. The 20-year-old Roy crashed head-first into the boards after a University of North Dakota player, Mitch Vig, avoided his check. Roy cracked his fourth vertebra and was left a quadriplegic.

Roy missed a year of college, but ultimately returned to BU, earning a degree in communications in 2000. Roy has remained a presence with the BU hockey program, attending games and on several occasions joining his teammates on the ice to celebrate Beanpot championships. Roy, (now deceased), has become an inspirational figure for sufferers of spinal cord injuries. In 1997 he founded the Travis Roy Foundation to raise money for research and individual grants, and in 1998 he published an autobiography titled Eleven Seconds. Roy remains close with Coach Jack Parker.

"It's very special to be a part of the BU hockey family," Roy wrote in a new afterword in the 2005 edition of his autobiography. "Coach Parker looks after his players long after they have played their last game for him."

In October 1999, Roy's #24 was retired, and raised to the rafters of Walter Brown Arena. Roy was the only BU hockey player to have been honored with a retired number until former head coach Jack Parker's number was retired in March 2014, though Roy was the only player to have his number retired under Parker's long tenure.

Roy died on October 29, 2020, at the age of 45.

== All-time scoring leaders ==
=== Career points leaders ===
Player	Years	GP	G	A	Pts	PIM
John Cullen	1983–87	160	98	143	241	163
David Sacco	1988–93	153	74	143	217	182
Chris Drury	1994–98	155	113	101	214	236
Rick Meagher	1973–77	124	90	120	210	170
Mike Eruzione	1973–77	127	92	116	208	70
Shawn McEachern	1988–91	120	79	107	186	153
Dave Tomlinson	1987–91	152	77	102	179	176
Mark Fidler	1977–81	116	77	101	178	144
Mike Kelfer	1985–89	139	83	89	172	115
Mike Hyndman	1967–70	88	52	119	171	105

Single-season points record:

- Jack Garrity, 84 points in 1949–50

=== Career goals leaders ===
Player	Years	Goals
Chris Drury	1994–98	113
John Cullen	1983–87	98
Bob Marquis	1957–60	98
Mike Eruzione	1973–77	92
Rick Meagher	1973–77	90

Single-season goals record:

- Jack Garrity, 51 goals in 1949–50

=== Career assists leaders ===
Player	Years	Assists
John Cullen	1983–87	143
David Sacco	1989–93	143
Vic Stanfield	1972–75	129
Peter Brown	1972–76	122
Rick Meagher	1973–77	120

Single-season assists record:

- Vic Stanfield, 60 assists in 1974–75

== Goaltending leaders ==
Career save percentage leaders (min. 40 games):

Player	Years	Goals against	Saves	Save %
John Curry	2003–07	217	2,606	92.3%
Ed Walsh	1971–74	160	1,633	91.1%
Tim Regan	1969–72	99	985	90.9%
Cleon Daskalakis	1980–84	257	2,440	90.5%
Sean Fields	2000–04	322	3,055	90.5%

Single-season save percentage record:

- Tim Regan, 92.9% in 1970–71

Career goals against average leaders:

Player	Years	Games played	Goals allowed	Goals against average
John Curry	2003–07	107	217	2.07
Dan Brady	1969–72	51	105	2.27
Tim Regan	1969–72	46	99	2.39
Wayne Ryan	1964–67	44	100	2.52
Jack Ferreira	1963–66	78	195	2.58

Single-season goals against average record:

- Tim Regan, 1.77 goals against in 1970–71

== Notable coaches ==
=== Wayland Vaughan ===
Wayland Vaughan coached Boston University from 1928 until 1943, compiling an 87–82–8 record. Vaughan was far from the most successful coach in terms of winning percentage, but maintained the Terriers program in the face of both the Great Depression and World War II. Without any conference affiliation, Boston University played erratic schedules, with anywhere from 10 to 15 games per season.

=== Harry Cleverly ===
Harry Cleverly, the BU coach from 1945 until 1962, guided the Terriers into the era of the NCAA tournament, which began in 1948, and brought BU to its first national championship game in 1950 and an additional three appearances in the tournament, which consisted of just four teams in those years. Under Cleverly's watch, BU helped create the Beanpot tournament and joined the ECAC hockey league.

=== Jack Kelley ===
Jack Kelley was the first coach to bring BU to the summit of college hockey. Kelley coached just ten seasons but appeared in four NCAA tournaments and won back-to-back titles in 1971 and 1972, his final years behind the bench. Kelley also won three ECAC regular season titles, one ECAC tournament title, and six Beanpots. Kelley recruited Jack Parker, who captained the Terriers in 1968 and became an assistant coach under Kelley.

=== Leon Abbott ===
Leon Abbott succeeded Kelley, and picked up where Kelley left off with a sterling 22-win season in 1972–73. However, eleven of his wins were forfeited due to an ineligible player. Six games into his second season, Abbott was abruptly fired for withholding information about two Canadian players who had played junior hockey in their home country. The ECAC had ruled them ineligible, only to be cleared to play by a judge. At a conference meeting, Abbott admitted not pressing the players to disclose the compensation they received as juniors. Although the judge hinted that the eligibility rules were unconstitutional, BU's administration was concerned enough about possible sanctions that it fired Abbott and named his assistant, Jack Parker, his successor.

=== Jack Parker ===
Jack Parker is the longest-tenured and winningest coach in Boston University history. Parker's accomplishments are almost unparalleled in college sports. In 40 years, he won 876 games, the highest tally for a hockey coach who has spent his whole career at just one school, while winning 21 Beanpot titles, 11 conference tournament titles and three national championships in 1978, 1995, and 2009. Parker helped found Hockey East in 1984, when several teams broke away from the ECAC to form their own conference, and played a crucial role in building Boston University's state-of-the-art arena. The ice sheet at Agganis Arena bears his name – Jack Parker Rink. Parker was voted NCAA hockey coach of the year in 1975, 1978, and 2009, and his 30 NCAA tournament wins are among the most of all time. At the conclusion of the 2012–2013 regular season, on his birthday, Parker announced his retirement.

== All-time coaching records ==
As of the completion of 2024–25 season

Tenure	Coach	Years	Record	Pct.
1917–1918	Edgar Burkhardt	1	0–1–0	.000
1919–1920	Harold Stuart	1	0–2–0	.000
1922–1924	John J. O'Hare	2	3–14–0	.176
1924–1928	Chippy Gaw	4	22–19–3	.534
1928–1940, 1941–1943	Wayland Vaughan	14	86–83–7	.509
1940–1941	Syd Borofsky	1	7–6–1	.536
1945–1962	Harry Cleverly	17	211–142–10	.595
1962–1972	Jack Kelley	10	206–80–8	.714
1972–1973	Leon Abbott	2*	15–19–1^{&}	.443
1973–2013	Jack Parker	40*	897–472–115	.643
2013–2018	David Quinn	5	105–68–21	.595
2018–2022	Albie O'Connell	4	58–49–16	.537
2022–Present	Jay Pandolfo	3	81–35–4	.692
Totals	12 coaches	103 seasons	1,691–987–185	.623

* Leon Abbott was fired in December 1973.
& Abbott's record was 26–8–1 before the school was forced to forfeited 11 wins from the 1972–73 season.

== Terriers in the NHL ==
As of July 1, 2025.

= NHL All-Star team	= NHL All-Star	= NHL All-Star and NHL All-Star team	= Hall of Famers	(Team initial circled to indicate Stanley Cup winning teams).

Player	Position	Team(s)	Years	Games	Stanley Cups
Peter Ahola	Defenseman	LAK, PIT, NYR, SJS, CGY	1991–1994	123	0
John Aiken	Goaltender	MTL	1957–1958	1	0
Tony Amonte	Right Wing	NYR, CHI, PHO, PHI, CGY	1990–2007	1,174	0
Ron Anderson	Right Wing	WAS	1974–1975	28	0
Adrian Aucoin	Defenseman	VAN, TBL, NYI, CHI, PHO, CBJ	1994–2013	1,108	0
Shawn Bates	Center	BOS, NYI	1997–2008	465	0
Kieffer Bellows	Left Wing	NYI, PHI, NSH	2019–Present	114	0
John Bethel	Left Wing	WIN	1979–1980	17	0
Nick Bonino	Center	ANA, VAN, PIT, NSH, MIN, SJS, NYR	2009–2024	868	2
Chris Bourque	Left Wing	WAS, PIT, BOS	2007–2013	51	0
Shane Bowers	Center	COL, NJD	2022–Present	13	0
Rich Brennan	Defenseman	COL, SJS, NYR, LAK, NSH, BOS	1996–2003	50	0
Macklin Celebrini	Center	SJS	2024–Present	70	0
Alex Chiasson	Right Wing	DAL, OTT, CGY, WAS, EDM, VAN, DET	2012–2023	651	0
Adam Clendening	Defenseman	CHI, VAN, PIT, EDM, NYR, ARI, CBJ	2014–2019	90	0
Colby Cohen	Defenseman	COL	2010–2011	3	0
Drew Commesso	Goaltender	CHI	2024–Present	2	0
Carl Corazzini	Right Wing	BOS, CHI	2003–2007	19	0
Charlie Coyle	Center	MIN, BOS, COL, CBJ	2012–Present	950	0
Jim Craig	Goaltender	ATF, BOS, MNS	1979–1984	30	0
Cameron Crotty	Goaltender	ARI, MIN, OTT	2023–Present	2	0
John Cullen	Center	PIT, HFD, TOR, TBL	1988–1999	621	0
John Curry	Goaltender	PIT, MIN	2008–2015	8	0
Cleon Daskalakis	Goaltender	BOS	1984–1987	12	0
Joe DiPenta	Defenseman	ATL, ANA	2002–2008	174	1
Rick DiPietro	Goaltender	NYI	2000–2013	319	0
Clark Donatelli	Center	MNS, BOS	1989–1992	35	0
Chris Drury	Left Wing	COL, CGY, BUF, NYR	1998–2011	892	1
Dale Dunbar	Defenseman	VAN, BOS	1985–1989	2	0
Jack Eichel	Center	BUF, VGK	2015–Present	616	1
Jim Ennis	Defenseman	EDM	1987–1988	5	0
Dante Fabbro	Defenseman	NSH, CBJ	2018–Present	377	0
Joel Farabee	Left Wing	PHI CGY	2019–Present	415	0
David Farrance	Defenseman	NSH	2020–2021	2	0
Domenick Fensore	Defenseman	CAR	2024–Present	2	0
Paul Fenton	Left Wing	HFD, NYR, LAK, WIN, TOR, CGY, SJS	1984–1992	411	0
Mike Fidler	Left Wing	CLE, MNS, HFD, CHI	1976–1983	271	0
Jakob Forsbacka Karlsson	Center	BOS	2016–2019	29	0
Doug Friedman	Left Wing	EDM, NSH	1997–1999	18	0
Matt Gilroy	Defenseman	NYR, TBL, OTT, FLA	2009–2014	225	0
Ryan Greene	Center	CHI	2024–Present	2	0
Jordan Greenway	Left Wing	MIN, BUF, CHI	2017–Present	435	0
A. J. Greer	Left Wing	COL, NJD, BOS, CGY, FLA	2016–Present	248	1
Mike Grier	Right Wing	EDM, WAS, BUF, SJS	1996–2011	1,060	0
Eric Gryba	Defenseman	OTT, EDM, NJD	2012–2019	289	0
Bob Gryp	Forward	BOS, WAS	1973–1976	74	0
Matt Grzelcyk	Defenseman	BOS, PIT, CHI	2016–Present	527	0
Lane Hutson	Defenseman	MTL	2023–Present	84	0
Quinn Hutson	Right Wing	EDM	2024–Present	2	0
Devin Kaplan	Right Wing	PHI	2024–Present	1	0
Clayton Keller	Center	ARI, UTA	2016–Present	601	0
Ken Kuzyk	Right Wing	CLE	1976–1978	41	0
Scott Lachance	Right Wing	NYI, MTL, VAN, CBJ	1991–2004	819	0
Dan Lacouture	Left Wing	EDM, PIT, NYR, BOS, NJD, CAR	1998–2009	337	0
Dick Lamby	Defenseman	STL	1978–1981	22	0
Michel Larocque	Goaltender	CHI	2000–2001	3	0
John Lilley	Right Wing	ANA	1993–1996	23	0
Charlie McAvoy	Defenseman	BOS	2016–Present	504	0
John McCarthy	Left Wing	SJS	2009–2016	88	0
Shawn McEachern	Left Wing	PIT, LAK, BOS, OTT, ATL	1991–2006	911	1
Rick Meagher	Center	MTL, HFD, NJD, STL	1979–1991	691	0
Wade Megan	Center	STL, DET	2016–2019	15	0
Freddy Meyer	Defenseman	PHI, NYI, PHO, ATL	2003–2011	281	0
Paul Miller	Center	COR	1981–1982	3	0
Matt Nieto	Left Wing	SJS, COL, PIT	2013–Present	705	0
Jack O'Callahan	Defenseman	CHI, NJD	1982–1989	389	0
Matt O'Connor	Goaltender	OTT	2015–2016	1	0
Paul O'Neil	Center	VAN, BOS	1973–1975	6	0
Danny O'Regan	Center	SJS, BUF	2016–2022	30	0
Tom O'Regan	Center	PIT	1983–1986	61	0
Chris O'Sullivan	Defenseman	CGY, VAN, ANA	1996–2003	62	0
Jake Oettinger	Goaltender	DAL	2019–Present	251	0
Jay Pandolfo	Left Wing	NJD, NYI, BOS	1996–2013	899	2
Mike Pandolfo	Left Wing	NJD	2003–2004	3	0
Tom Poti	Defenseman	EDM, NYR, NYI, WAS	1998–2013	824	0
Evan Rodrigues	Left Wing	BUF, PIT, COL, FLA	2015–Present	547	2
Ed Ronan	Left Wing	MTL, WIN, BUF	1991–1997	182	1
David Sacco	Center	TOR, ANA	1993–1996	25	0
Joe Sacco	Right Wing	TOR, ANA, NYI, WSH, PHI	1990–2003	738	0
Kevin Shattenkirk	Defenseman	COL, STL, WAS, NYR, TBL, ANA, BOS	2010–2024	952	1
Scott Shaunessy	Defenseman	QUE	1986–1989	7	0
Dave Silk	Right Wing	NYR, BOS, DET, WIN	1979–1986	249	0
Brian Strait	Defenseman	PIT, NYI, WPG	2010–2017	187	0
Mike Sullivan	Center	SJS, CGY, BOS, PHO	1991–2002	709	2†
Brady Tkachuk	Left Wing	OTT, FLA	2018–Present	512	0
Keith Tkachuk	Left Wing	WIN, PHO, STL, ATL	1991–2010	1,201	0
Dave Tomlinson	Center	TOR, WIN, FLA	1991–1995	42	0
Nick Vachon	Center	NYI	1996–1997	1	0
David Van der Gulik	Left Wing	CGY, COL, LAK	2008–2015	49	0
Alex Vlasic	Defenseman	CHI	2021–Present	179	0
Phil Von Stefenelli	Defenseman	BOS, OTT	1995–1997	33	0
David Warsofsky	Defenseman	BOS, PIT, NJD, COL	2013–2018	55	0
Bill Whelton	Defenseman	WIN	1980–1981	2	0
Ryan Whitney	Defenseman	PIT, ANA, EDM, FLA	2005–2014	481	0
Max Willman	Center	PHI, NJD	2021–2024	68	0
Colin Wilson	Center	NSH, COL	2009–2020	632	0
Brandon Yip	Right Wing	COL, NSH, PHO	2009–2014	174	0
Scott Young	Right Wing	HFD, PIT, QUE, COL, ANA, STL, DAL	1987–2006	1,181	2
Trevor Zegras	Center	ANA, PHI	2020–Present	268	0

† Mike Sullivan won two Stanley Cups as the head coach for the Pittsburgh Penguins

=== WHA ===
Additionally, three former Terriers played in the World Hockey Association, a rival league that folded and merged with the NHL in 1979.

Player	Position	Team(s)	Years	Avco Cups
Bob Brown	Defenseman	PHB, NYD, NYG/JK	1972–1974	0
John Danby	Forward	NEW	1972–1976	1
Ric Jordan	Defenseman	NEW, QUE, CAC	1972–1977	1

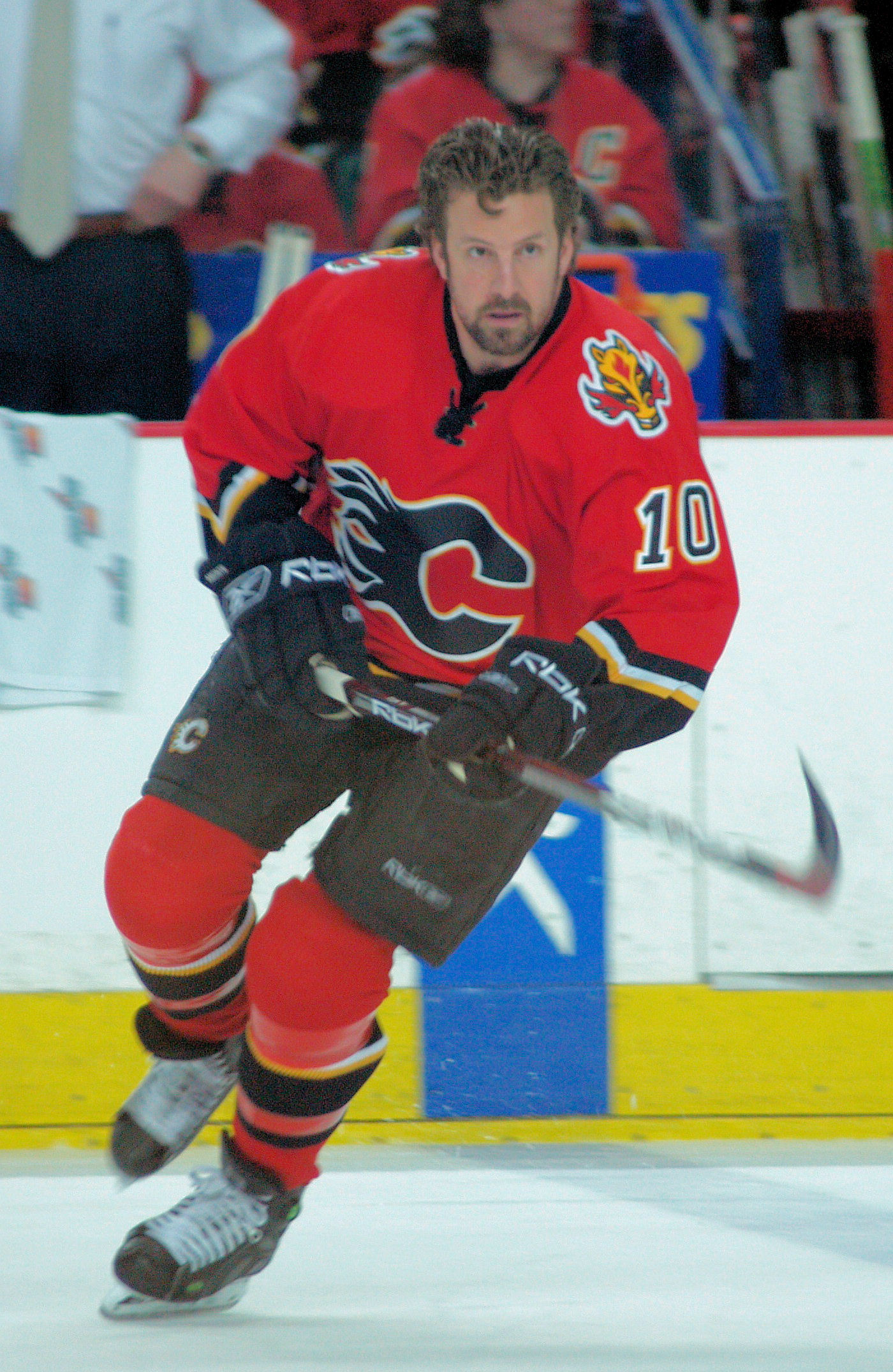
Tony Amonte

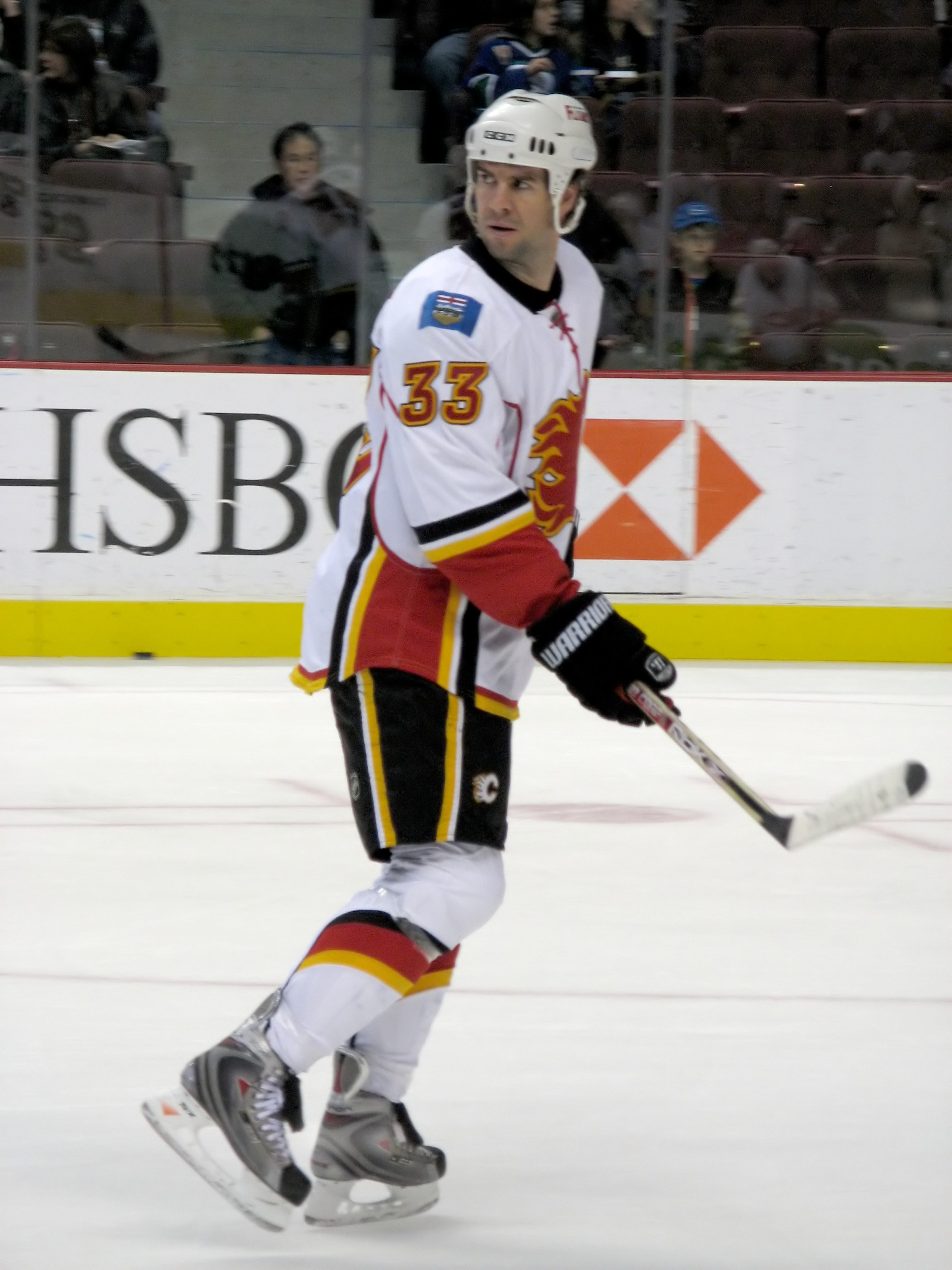
Adrian Aucoin

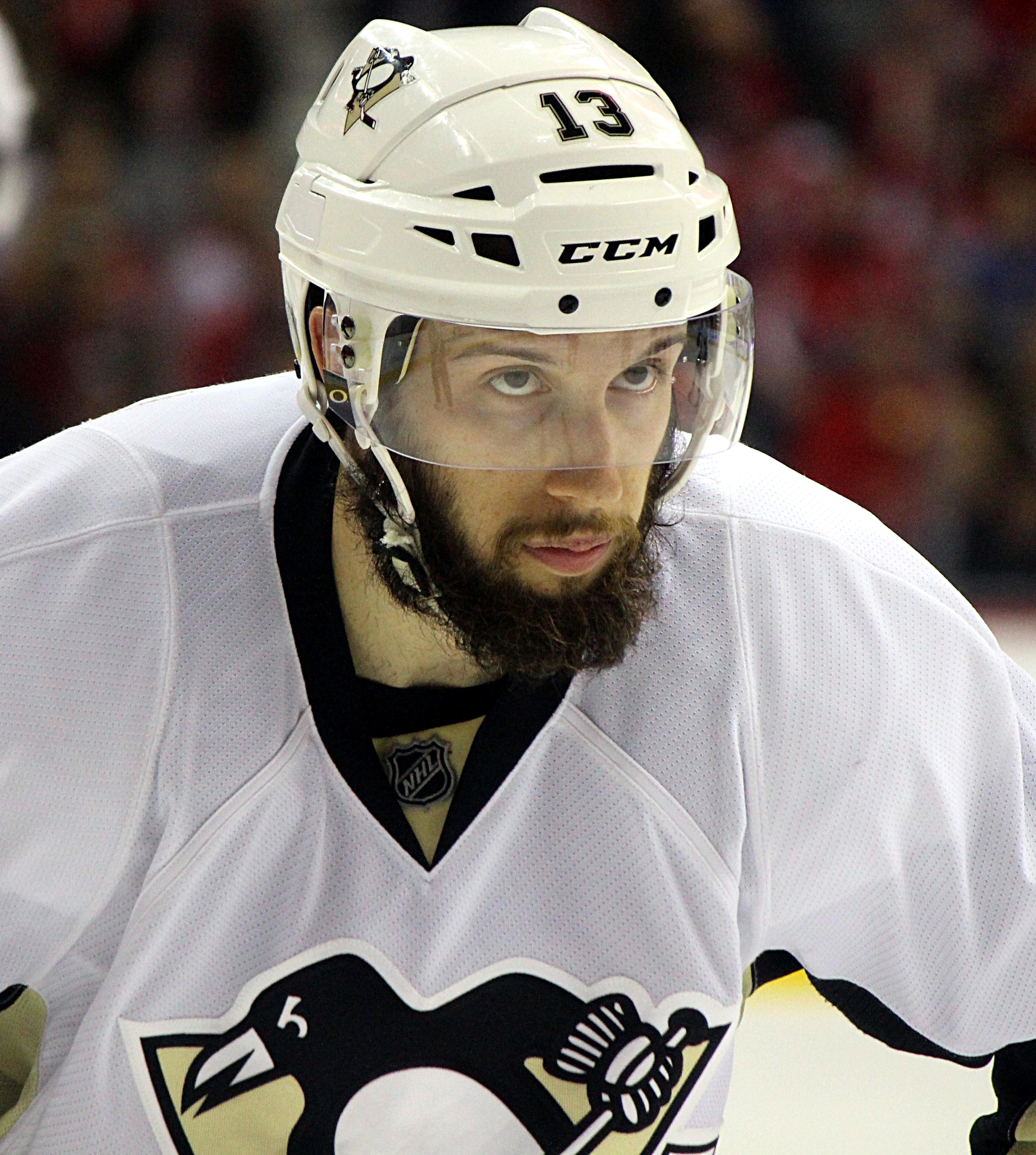
Nick Bonino

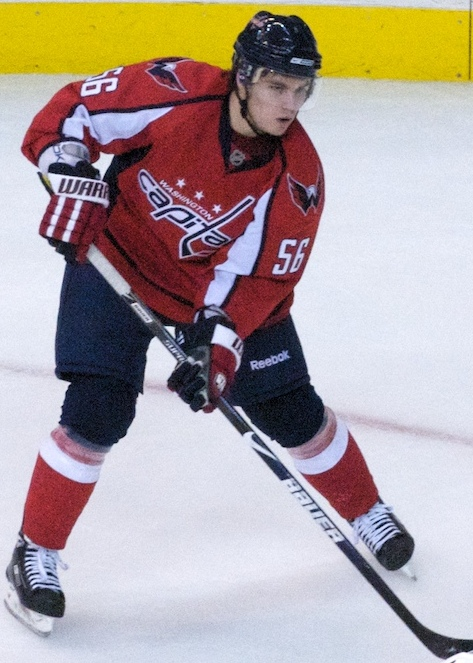
Chris Bourque

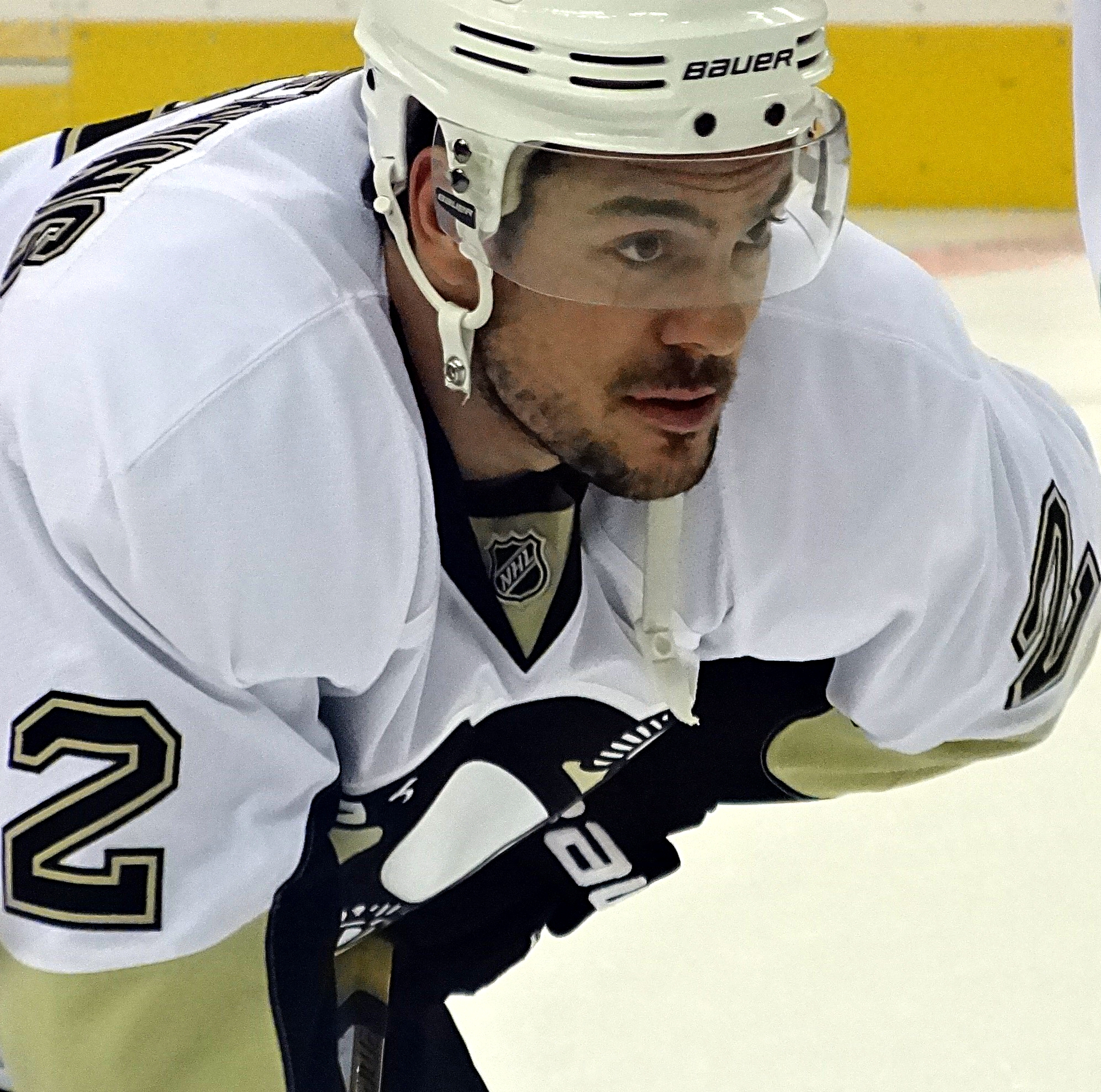
Adam Clendening

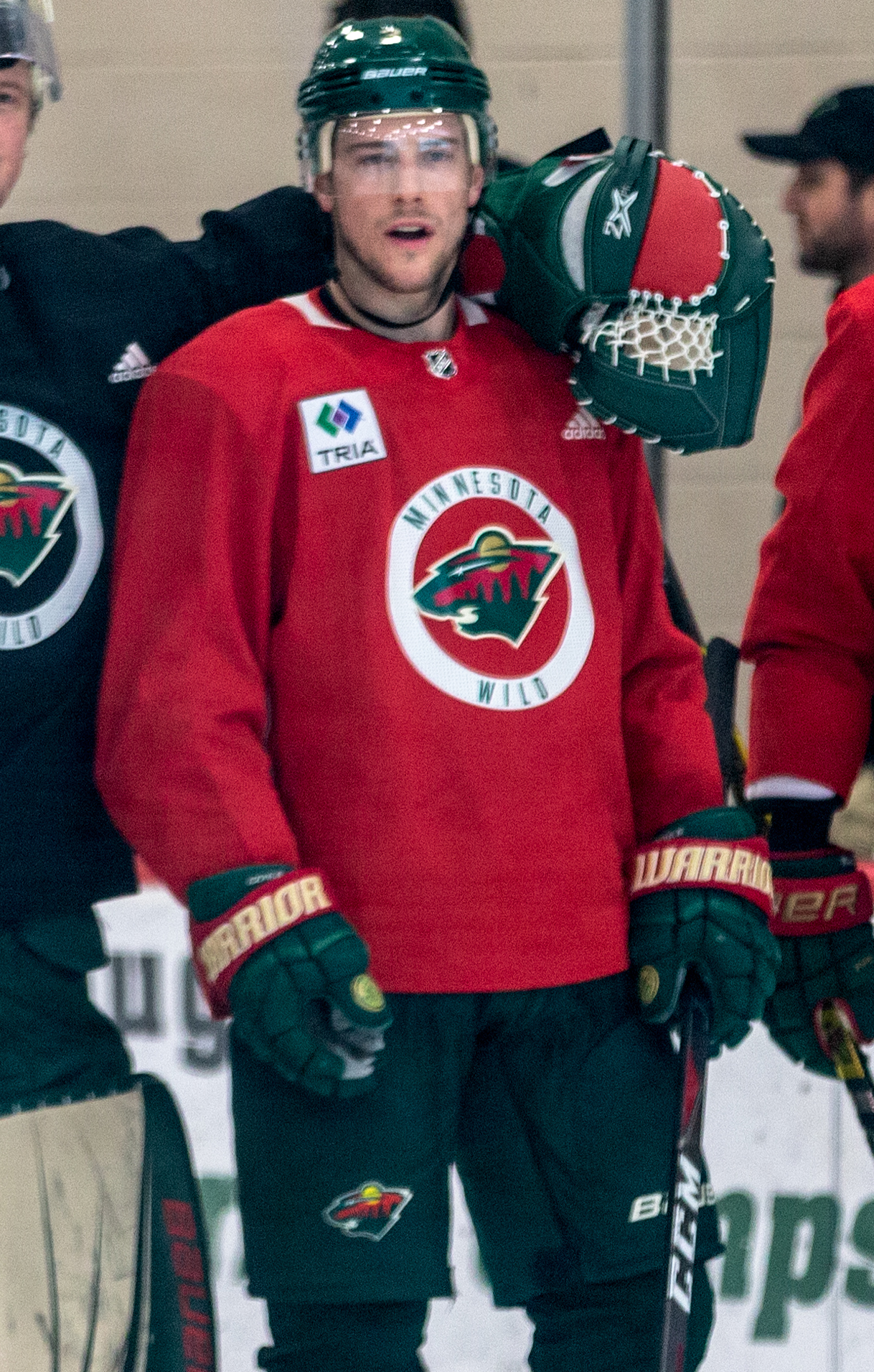
Charlie Coyle

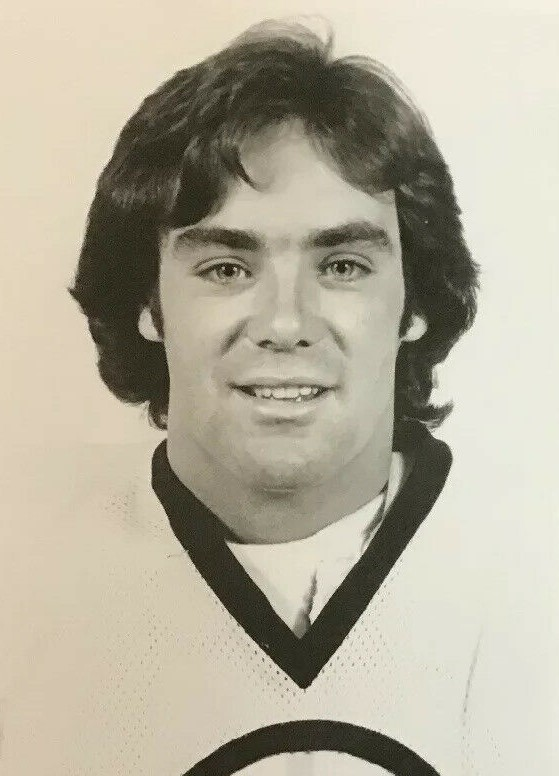
Jim Craig

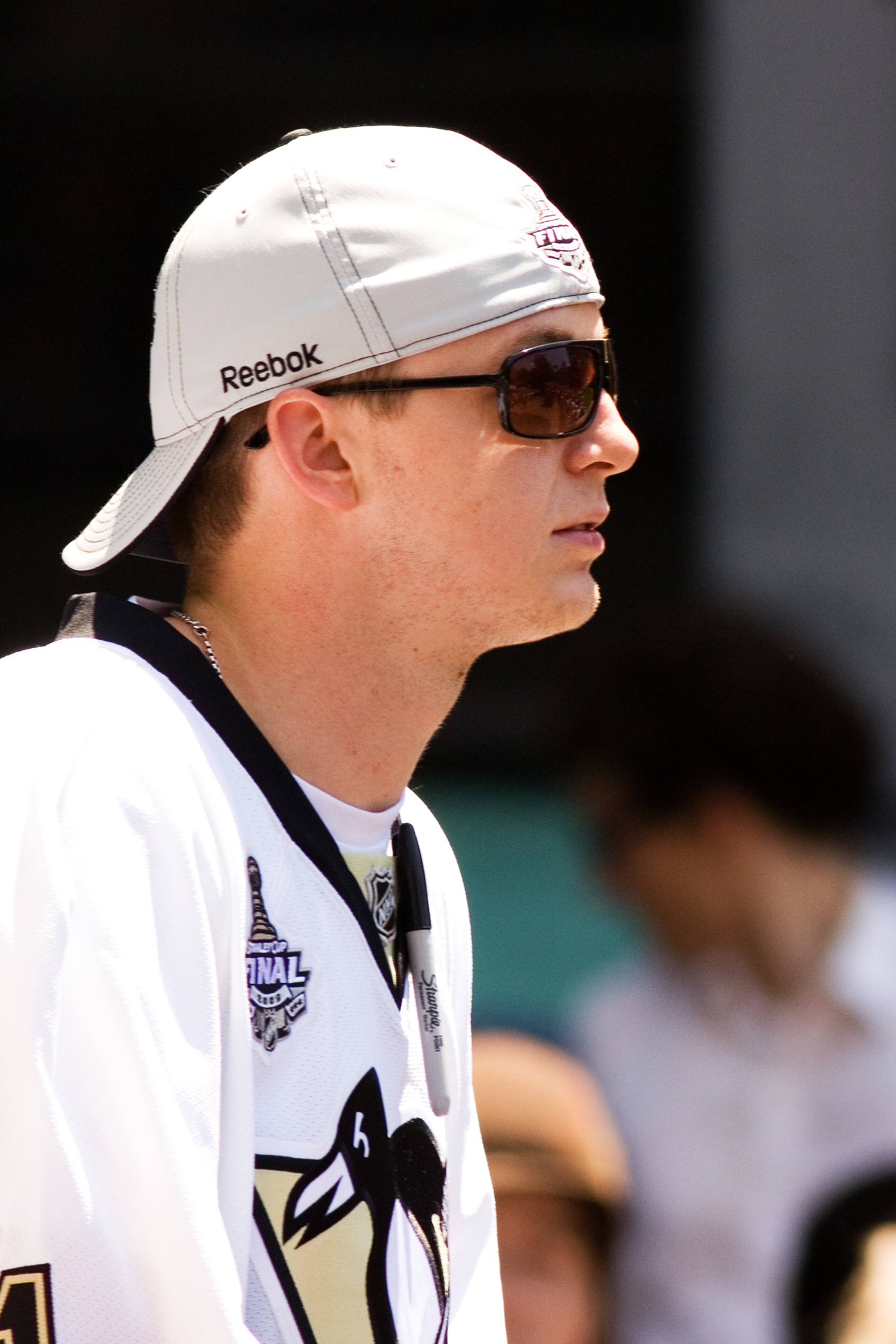
John Curry

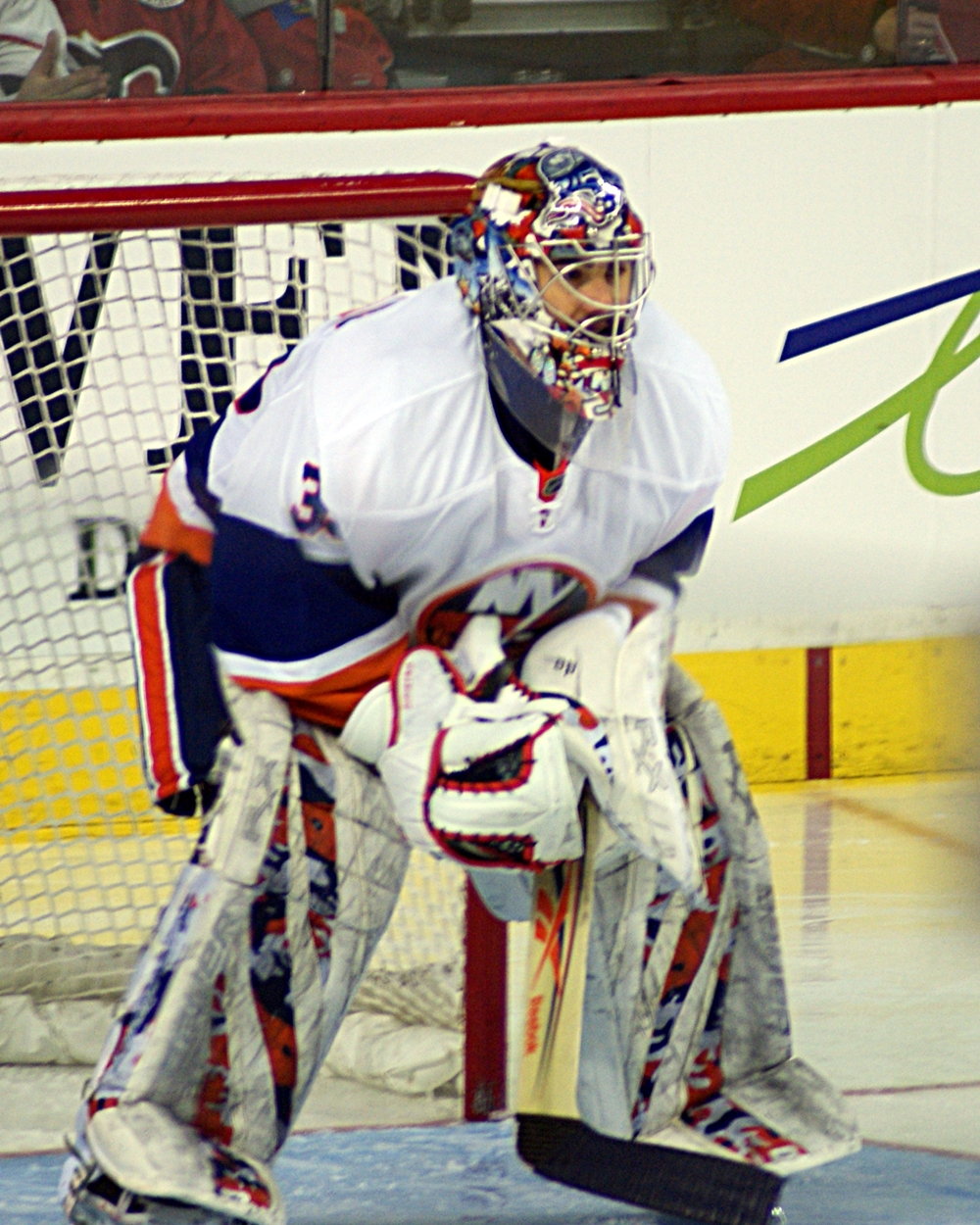
Rick DiPietro

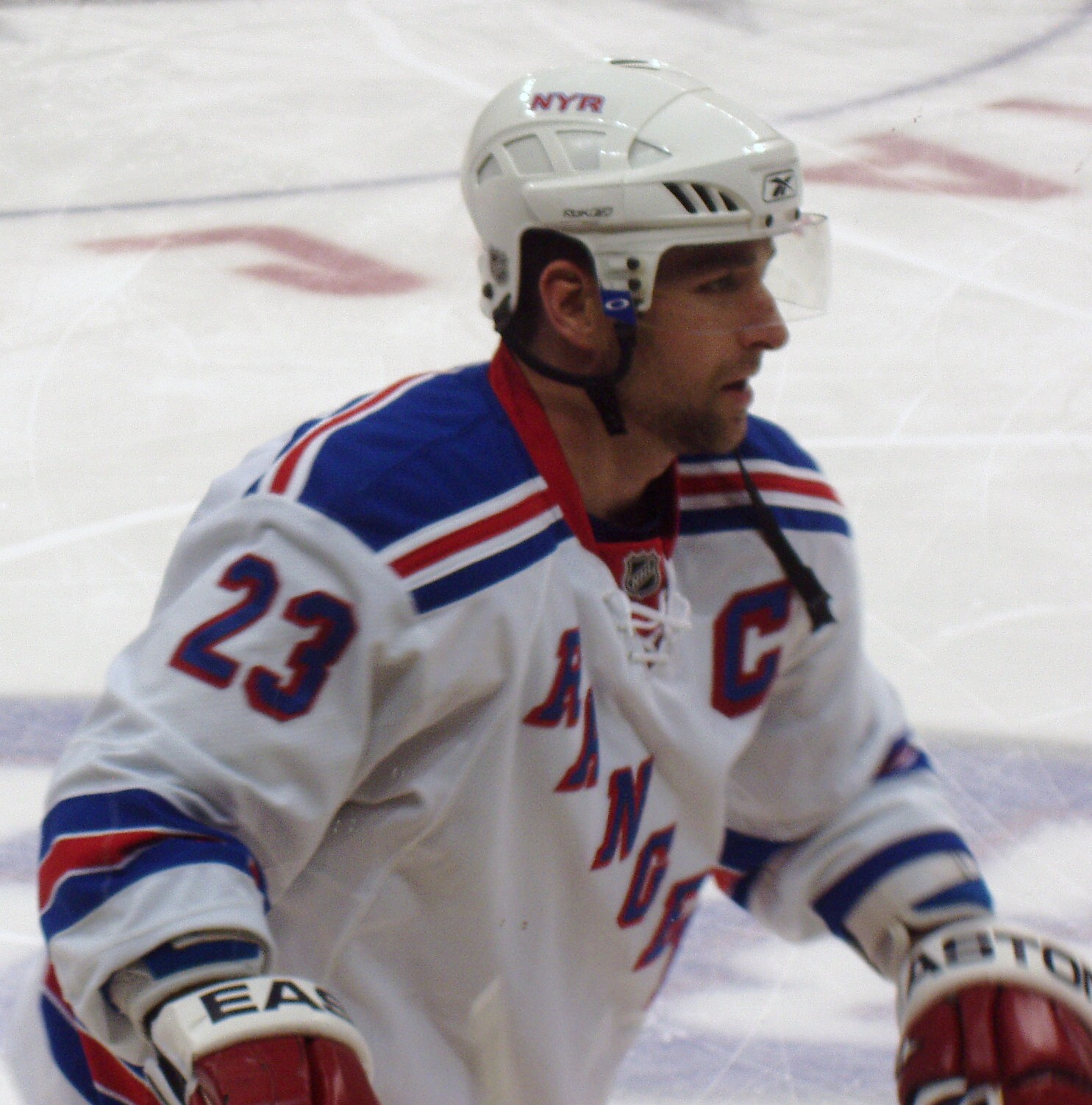
Chris Drury

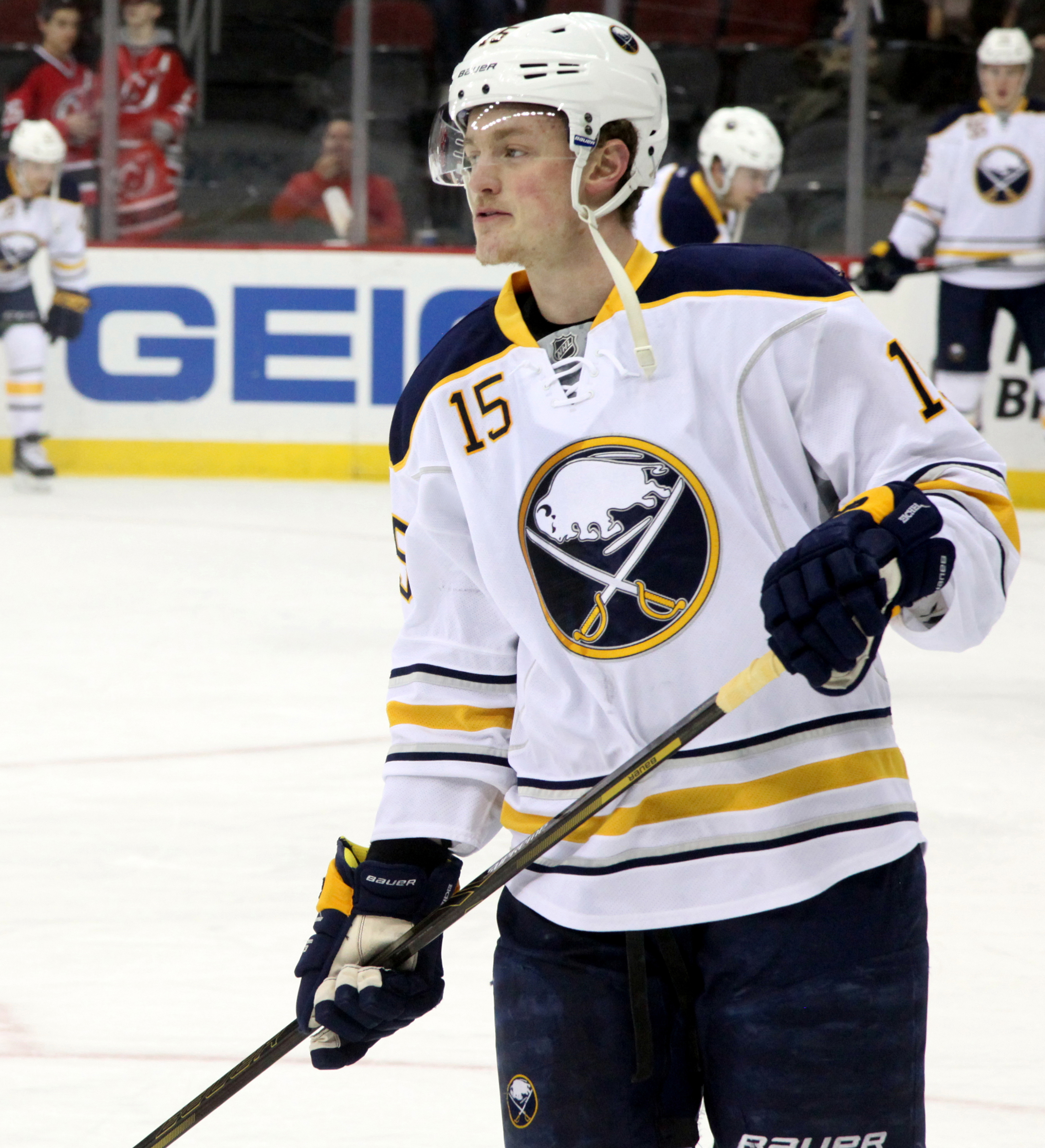
Jack Eichel

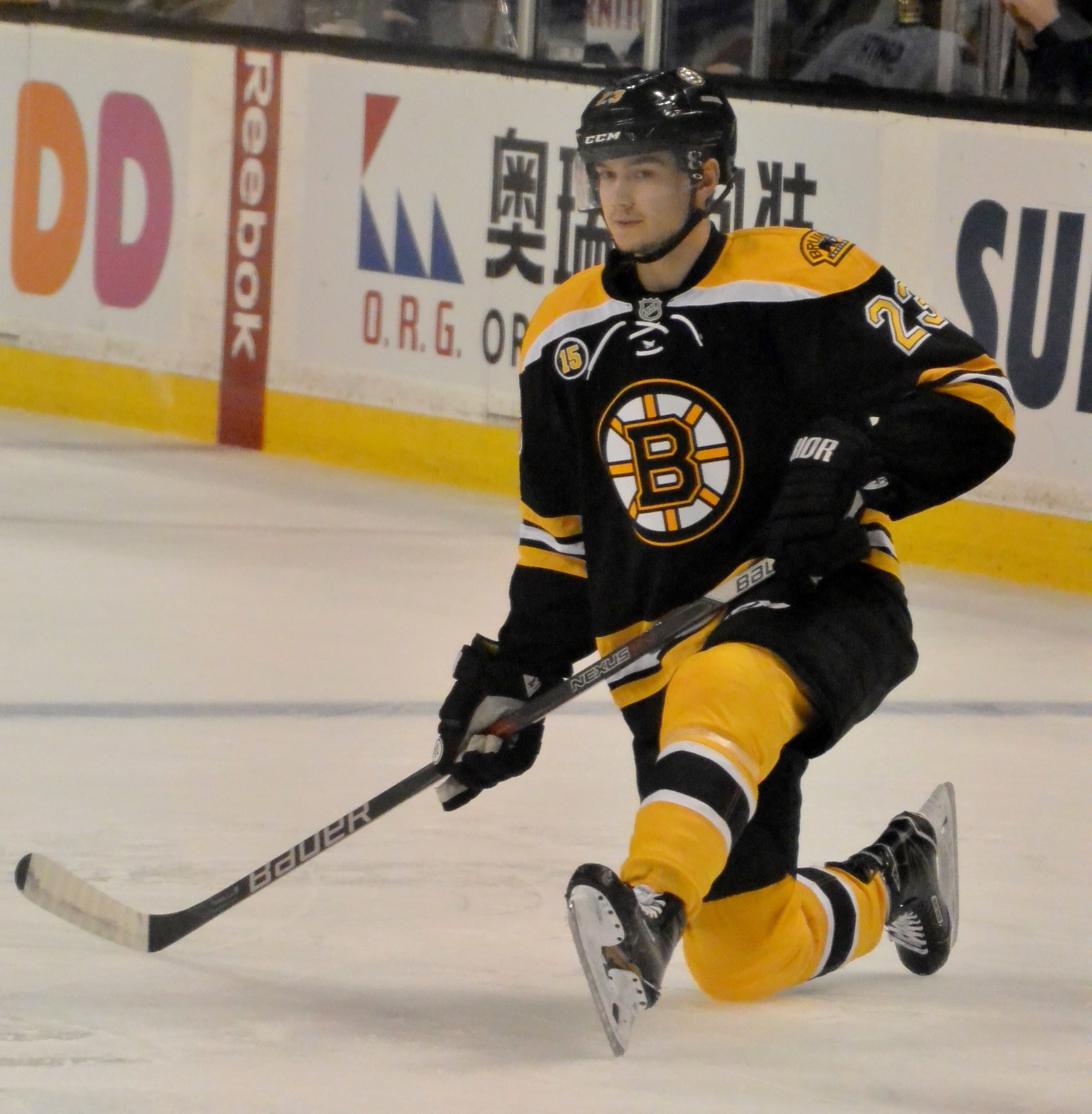
Jakob Forsbacka Karlsson

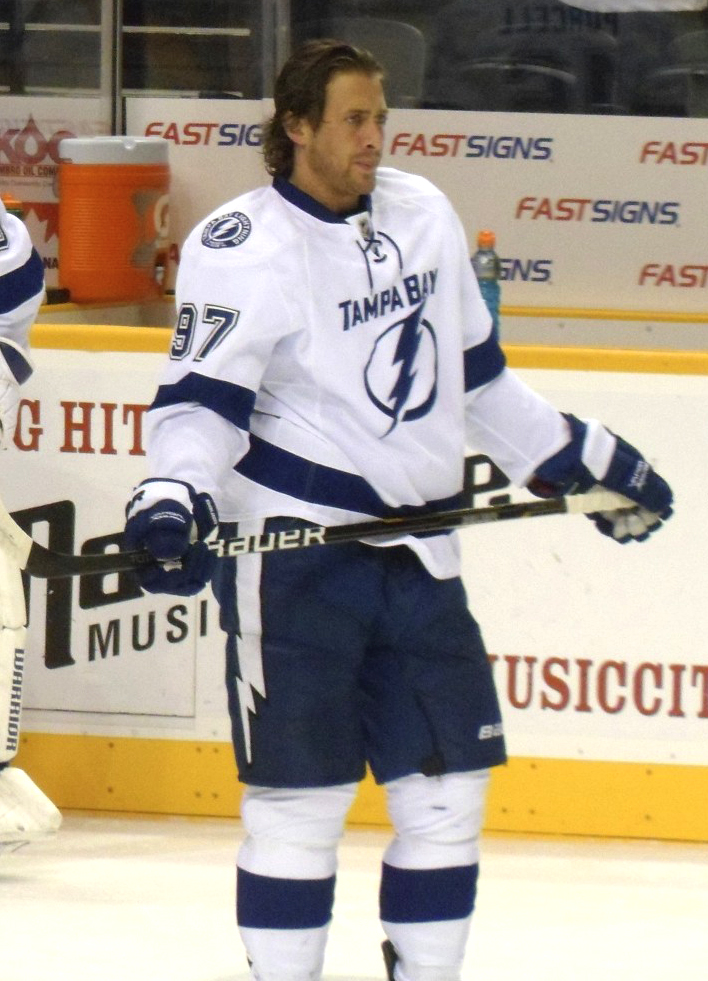
Matt Gilroy

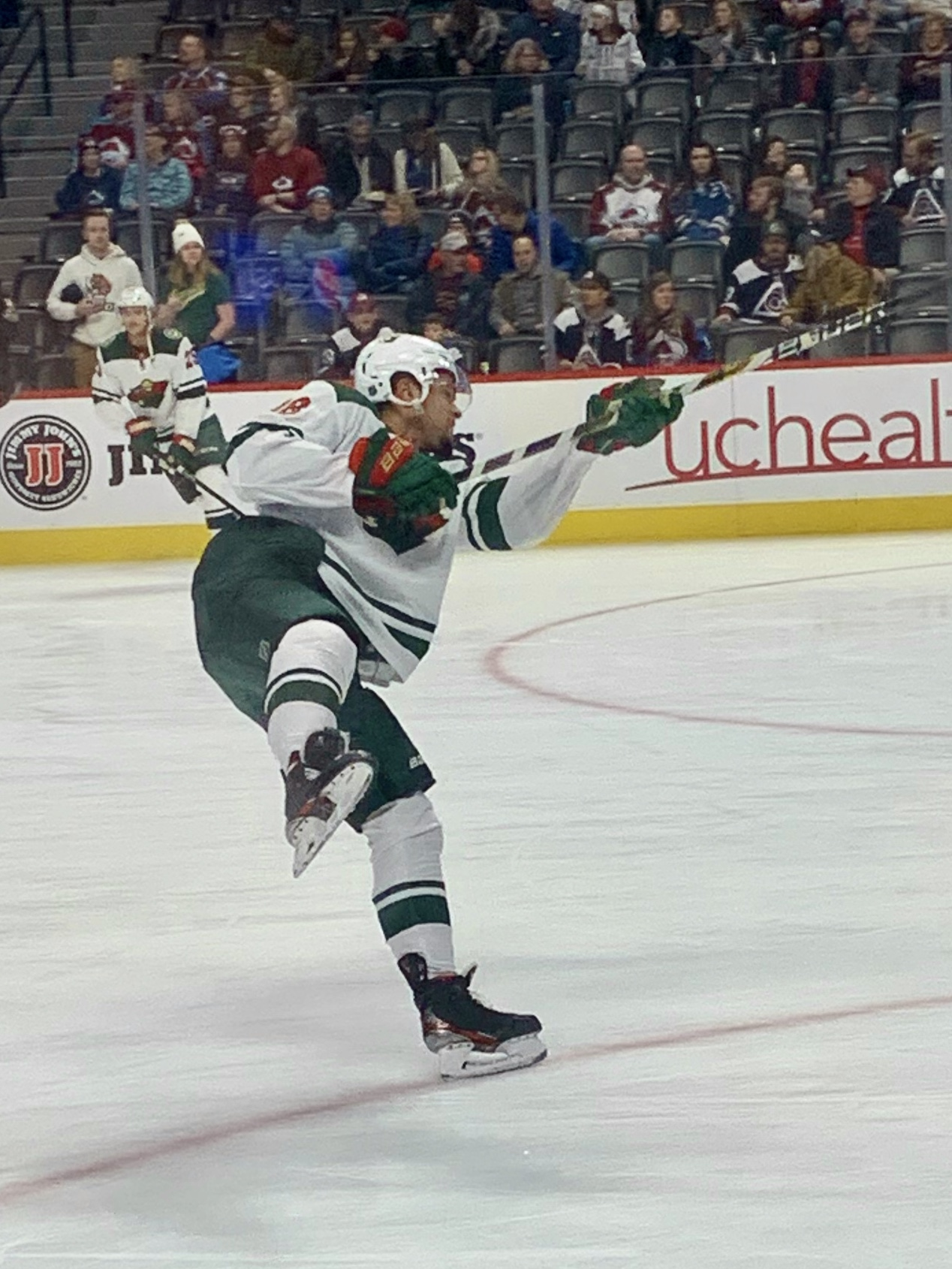
Jordan Greenway

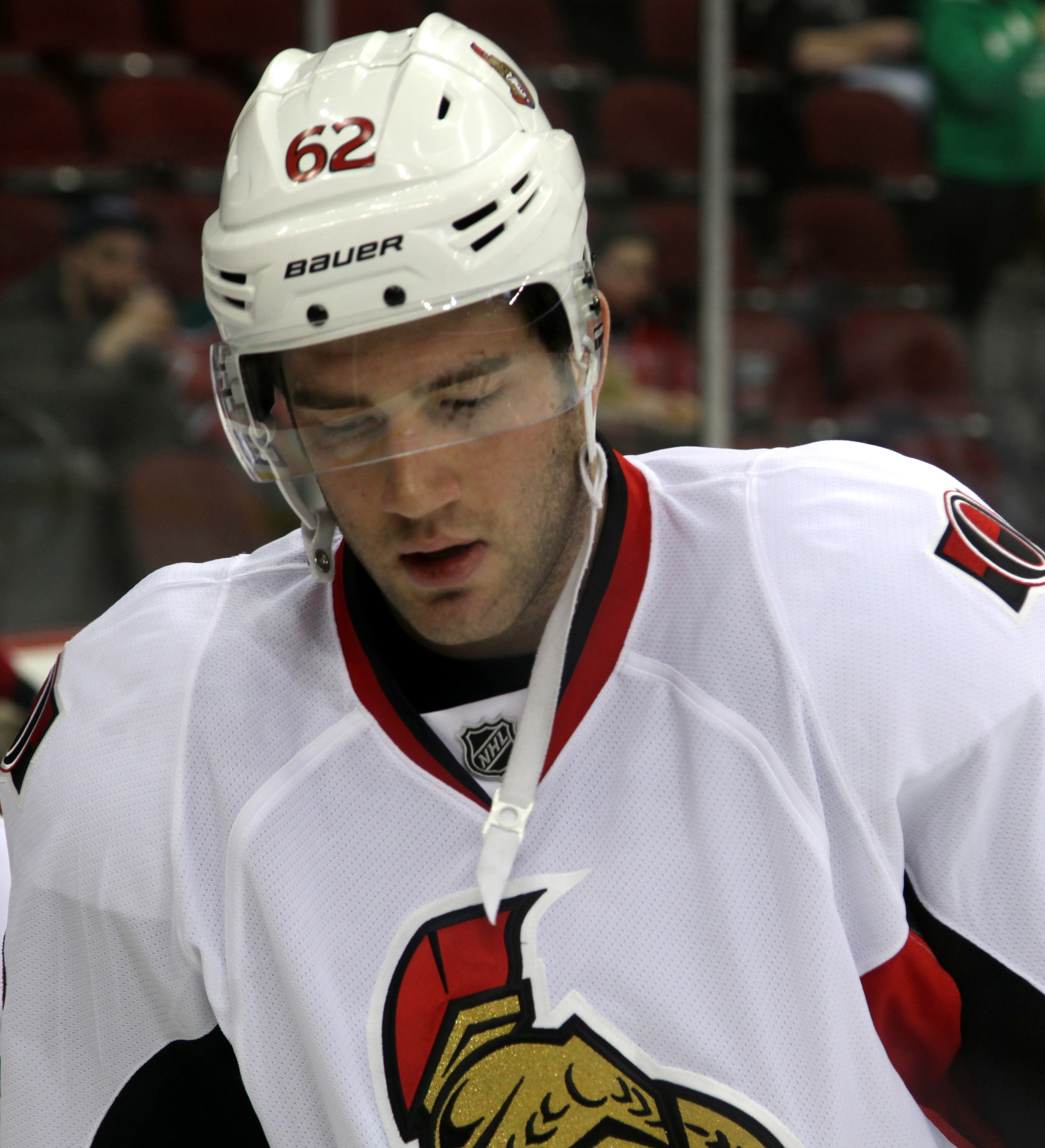
Eric Gryba

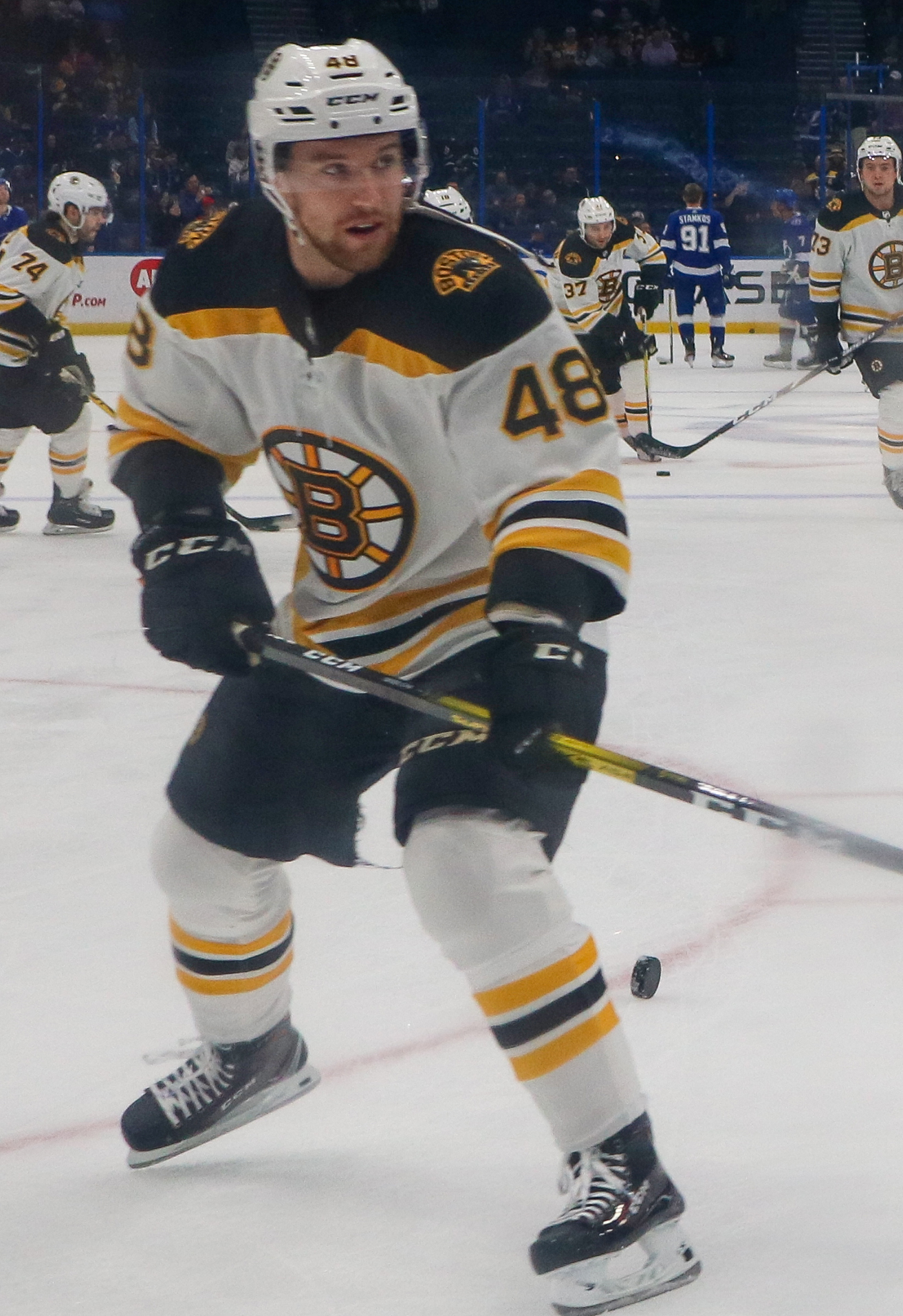
Matt Grzelcyk

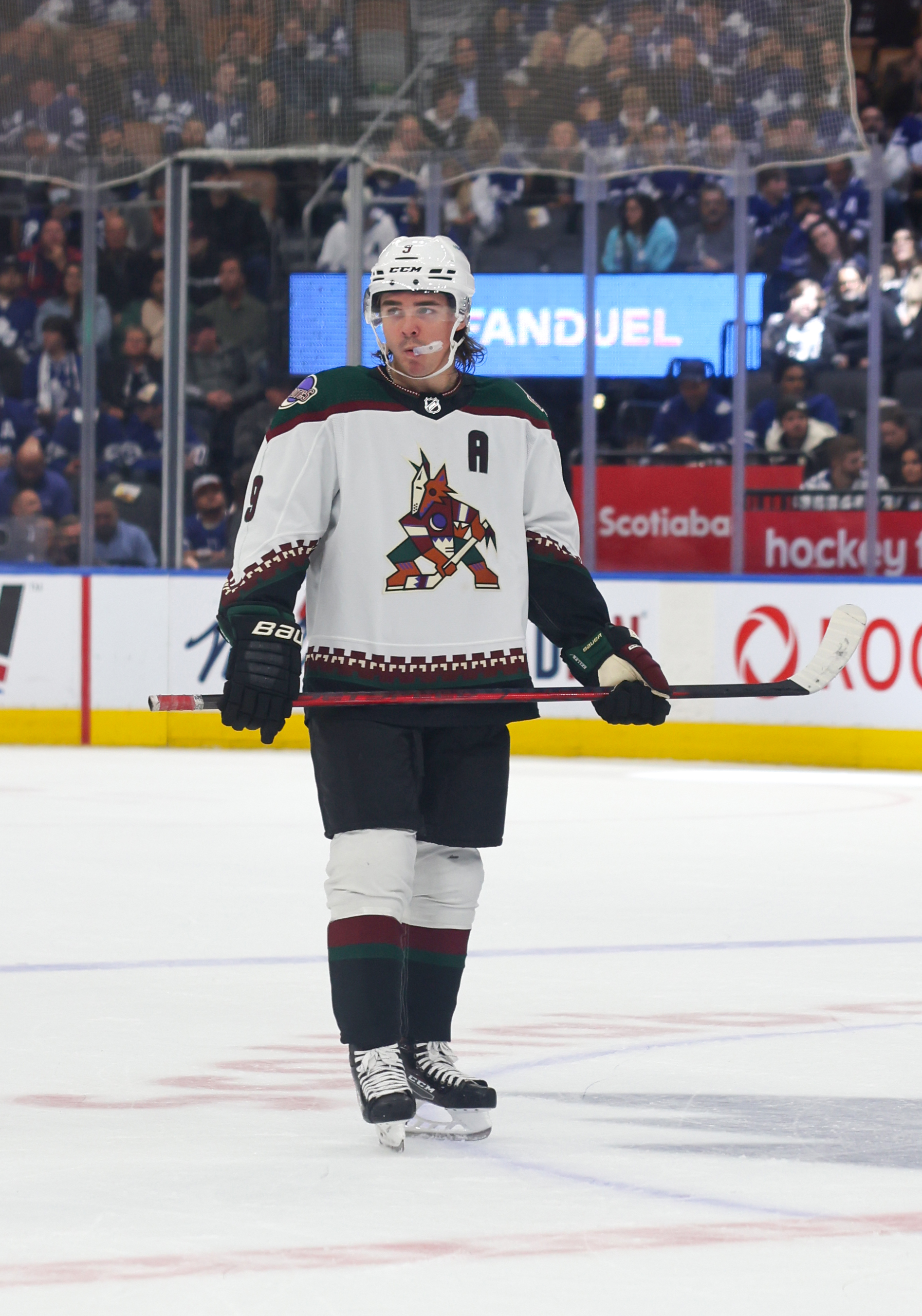
Clayton Keller

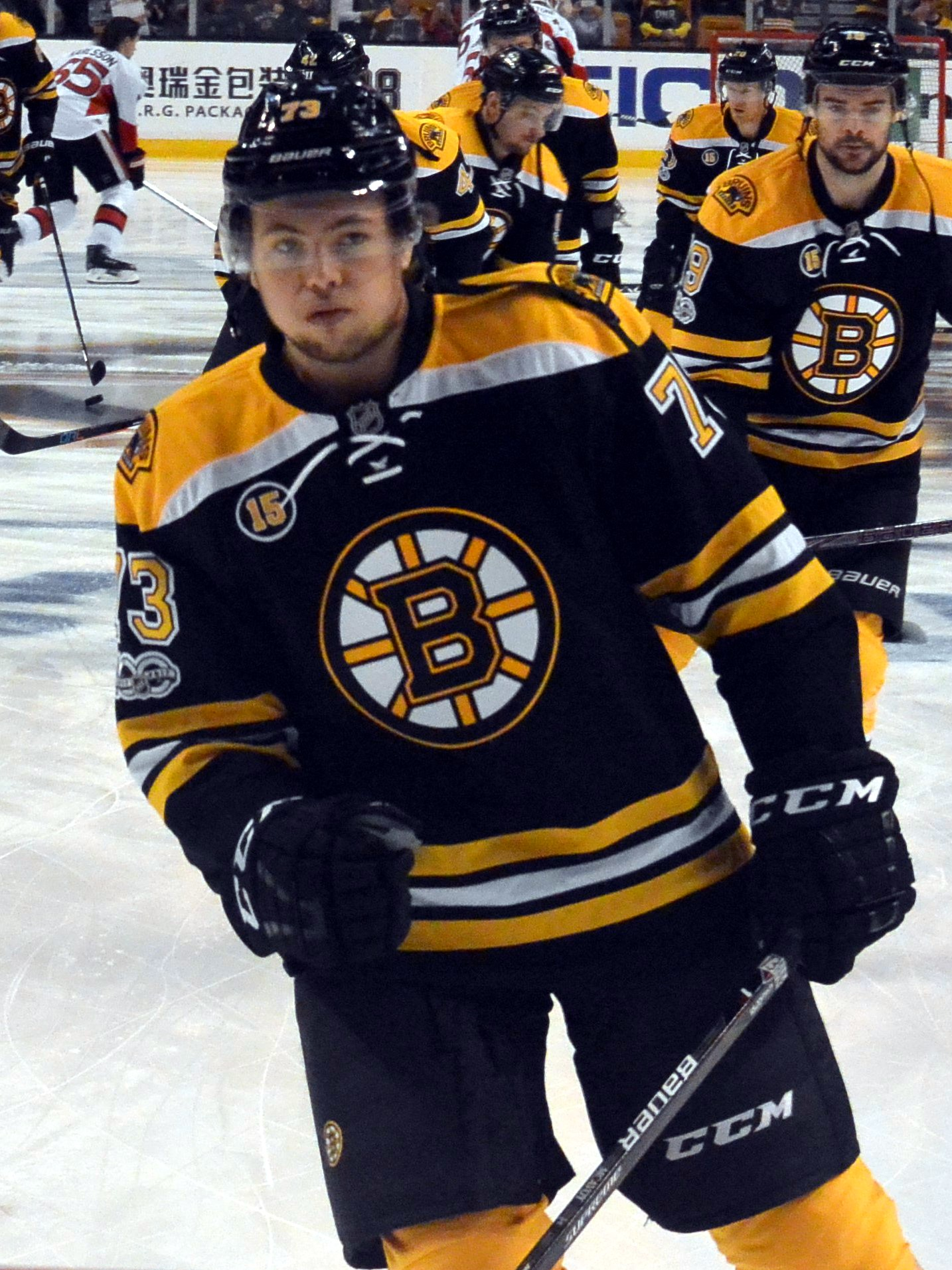
Charlie McAvoy

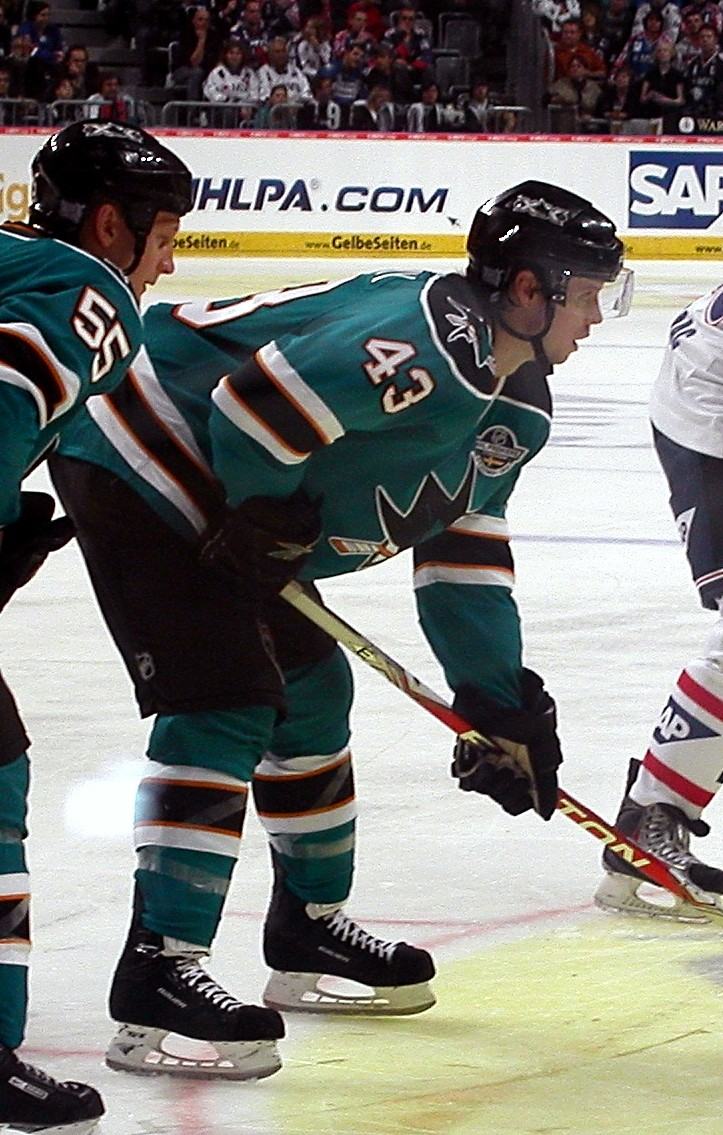
John McCarthy

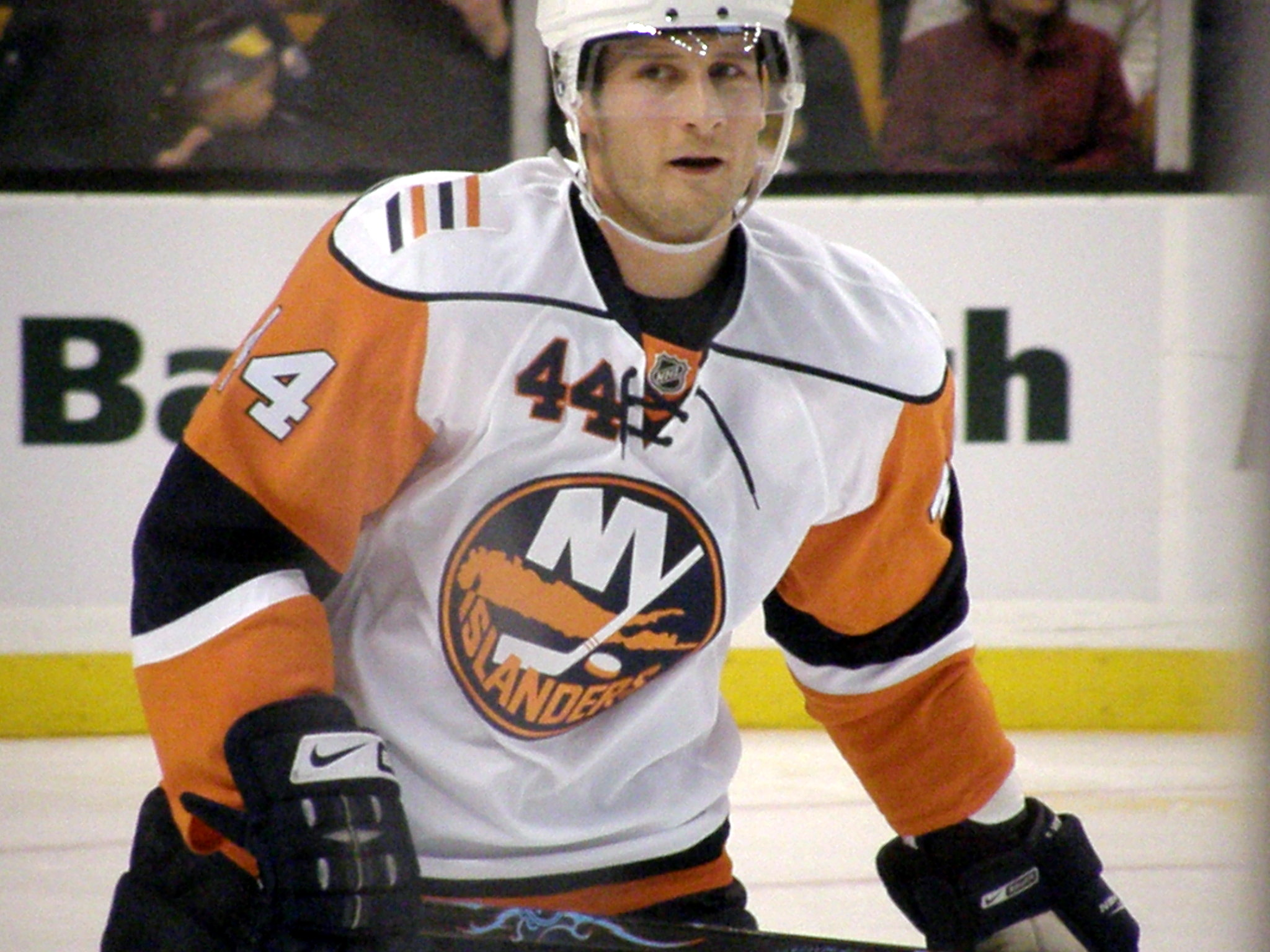
Freddy Meyer

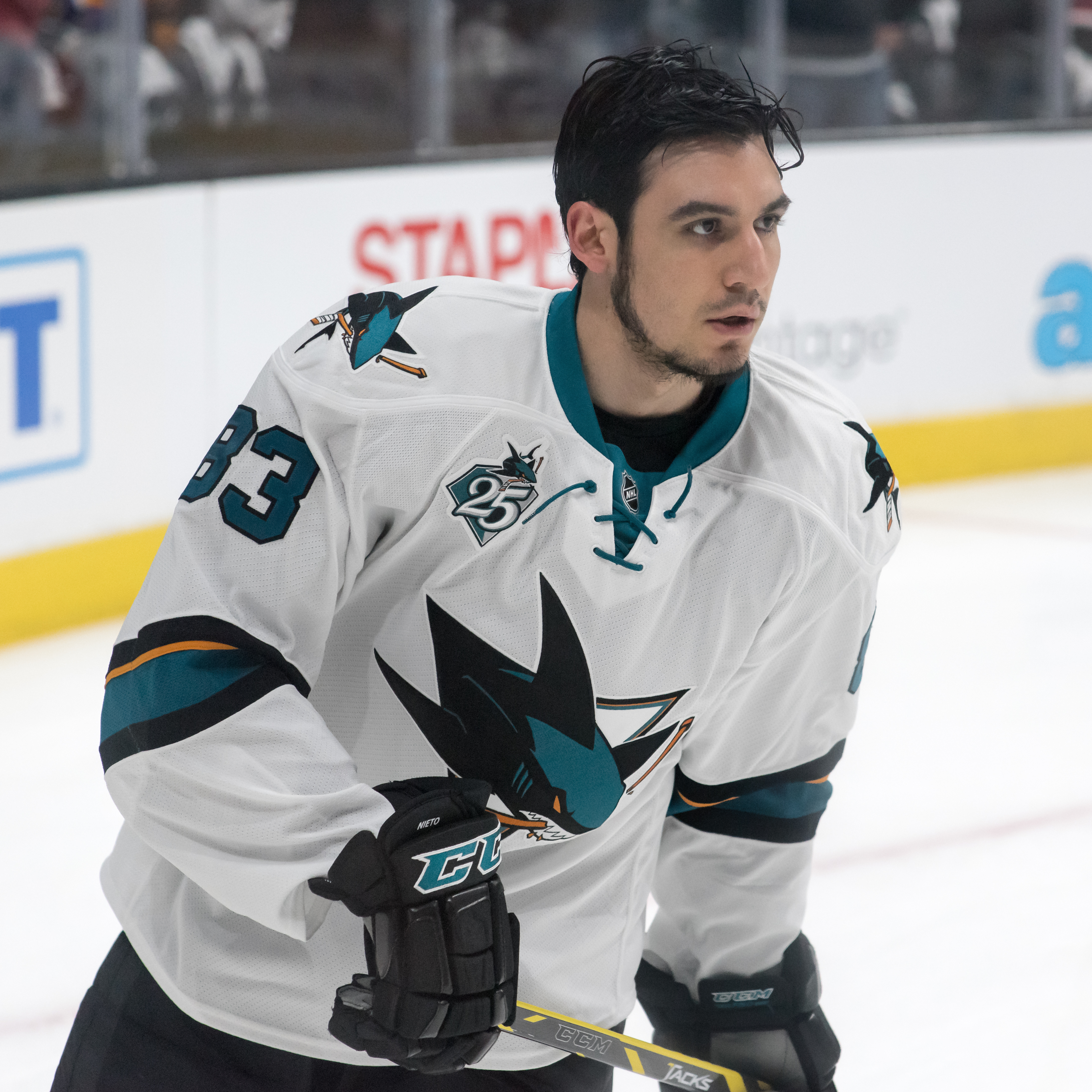
Matt Nieto

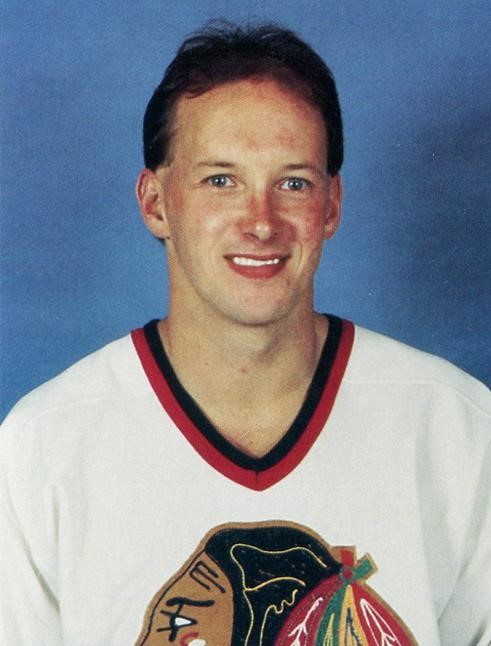
Jack O'Callahan

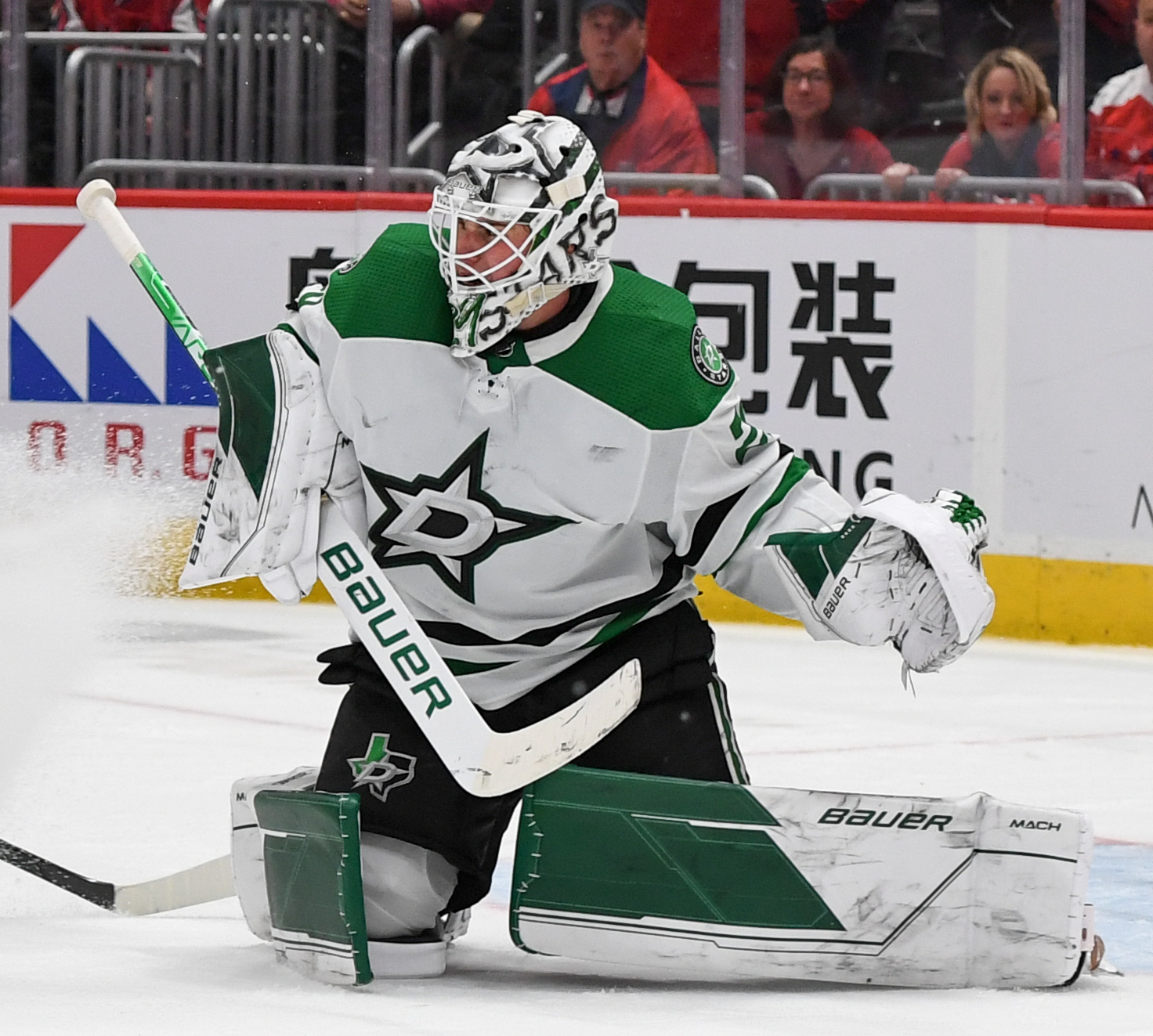
Jake Oettinger

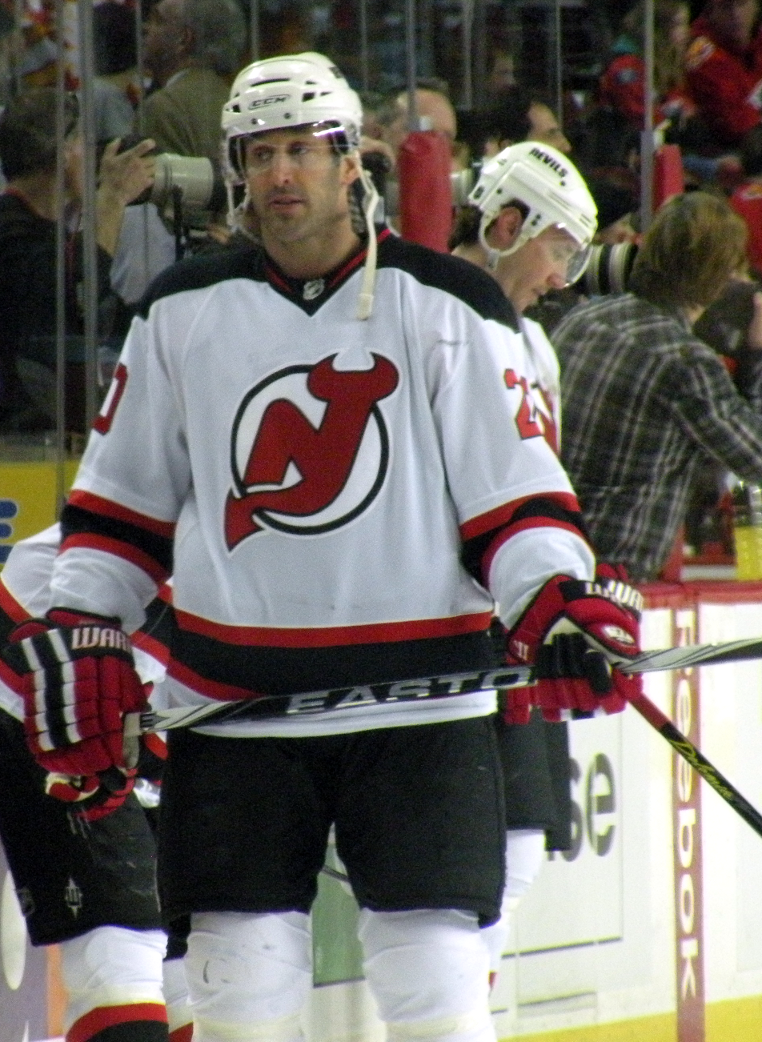
Jay Pandolfo

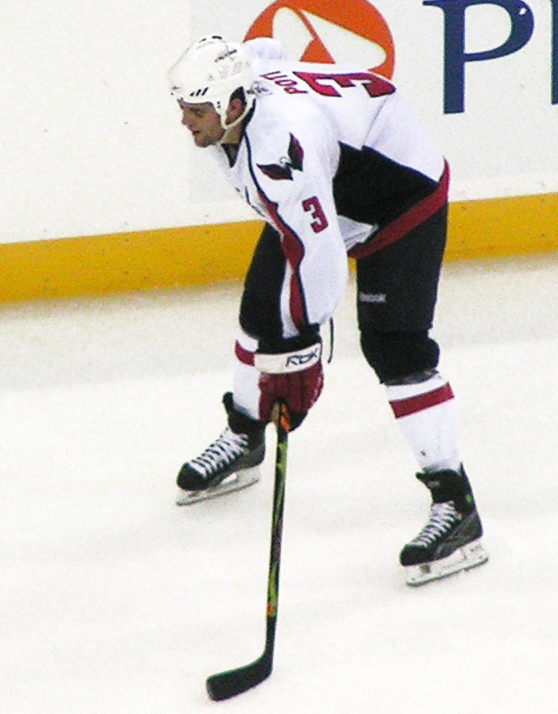
Tom Poti

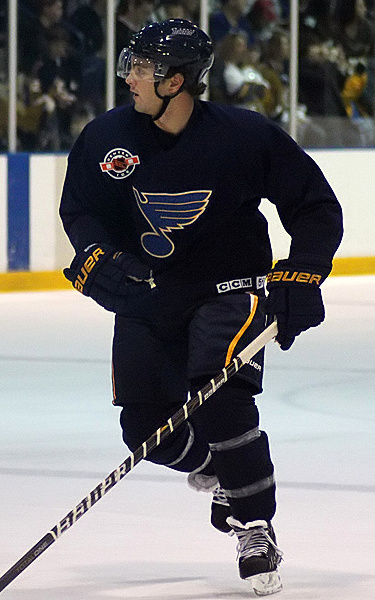
Kevin Shattenkirk

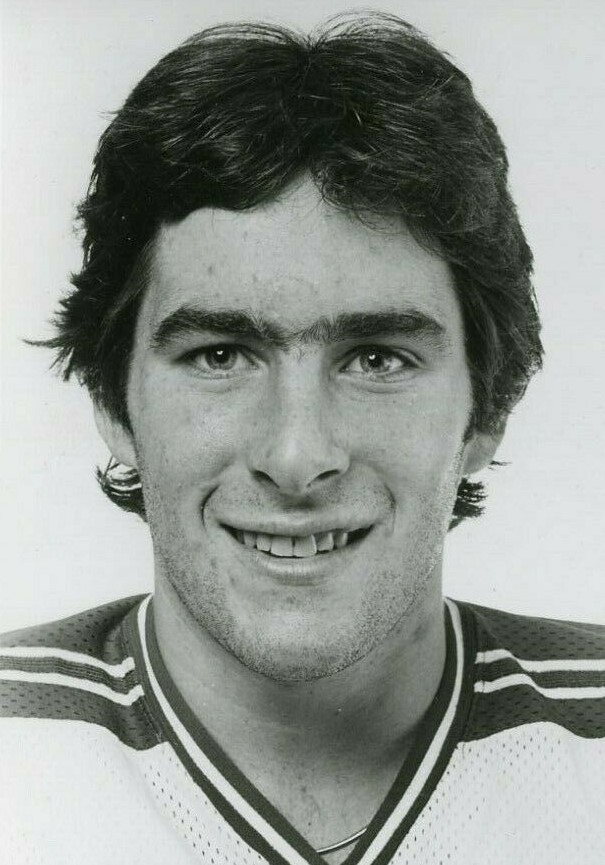
Dave Silk

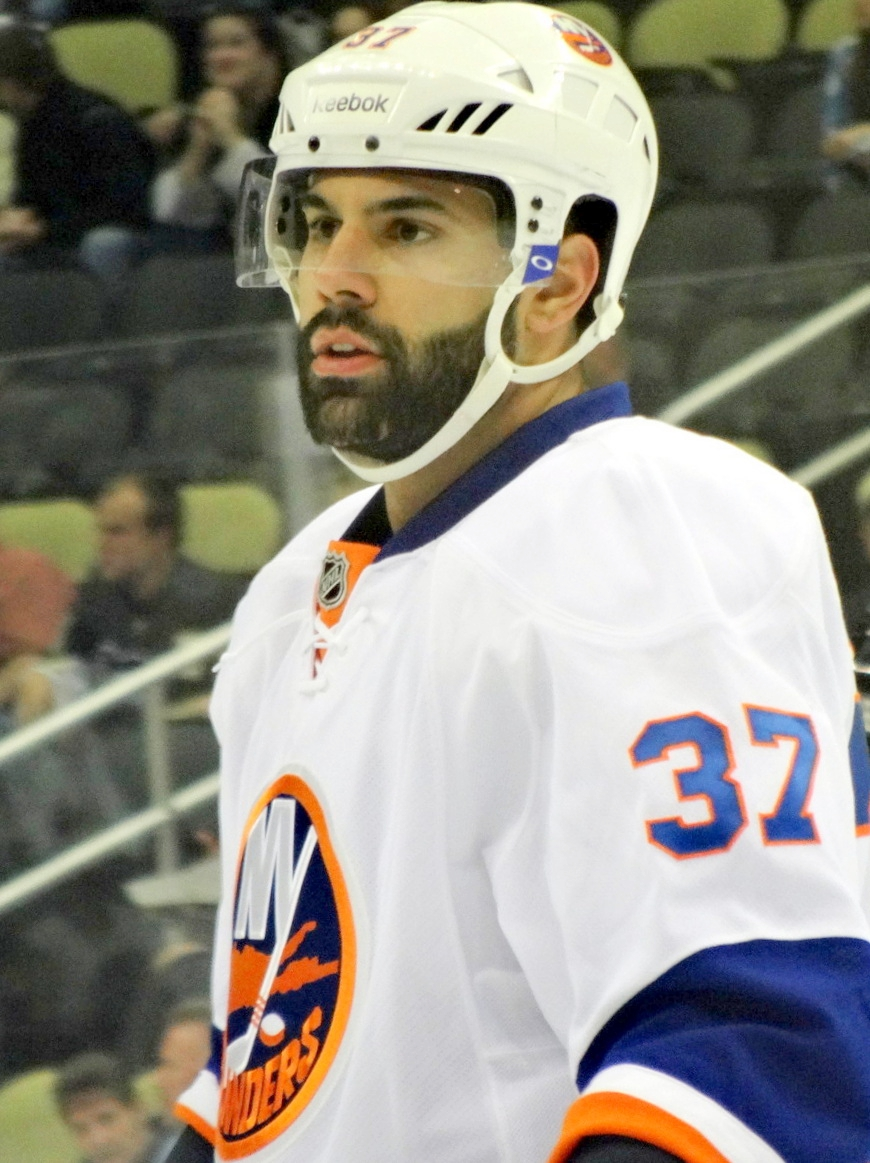
Brian Strait

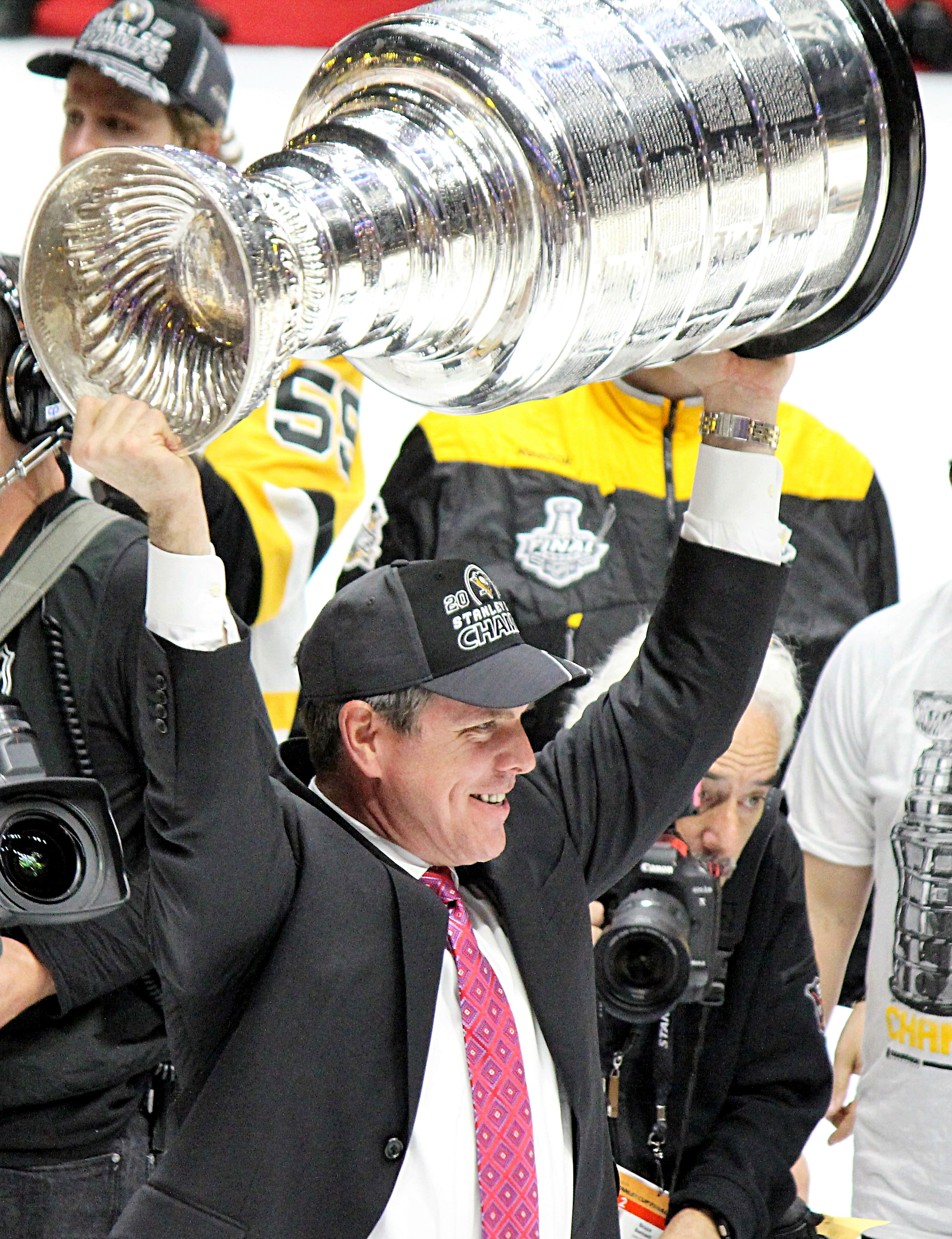
Mike Sullivan

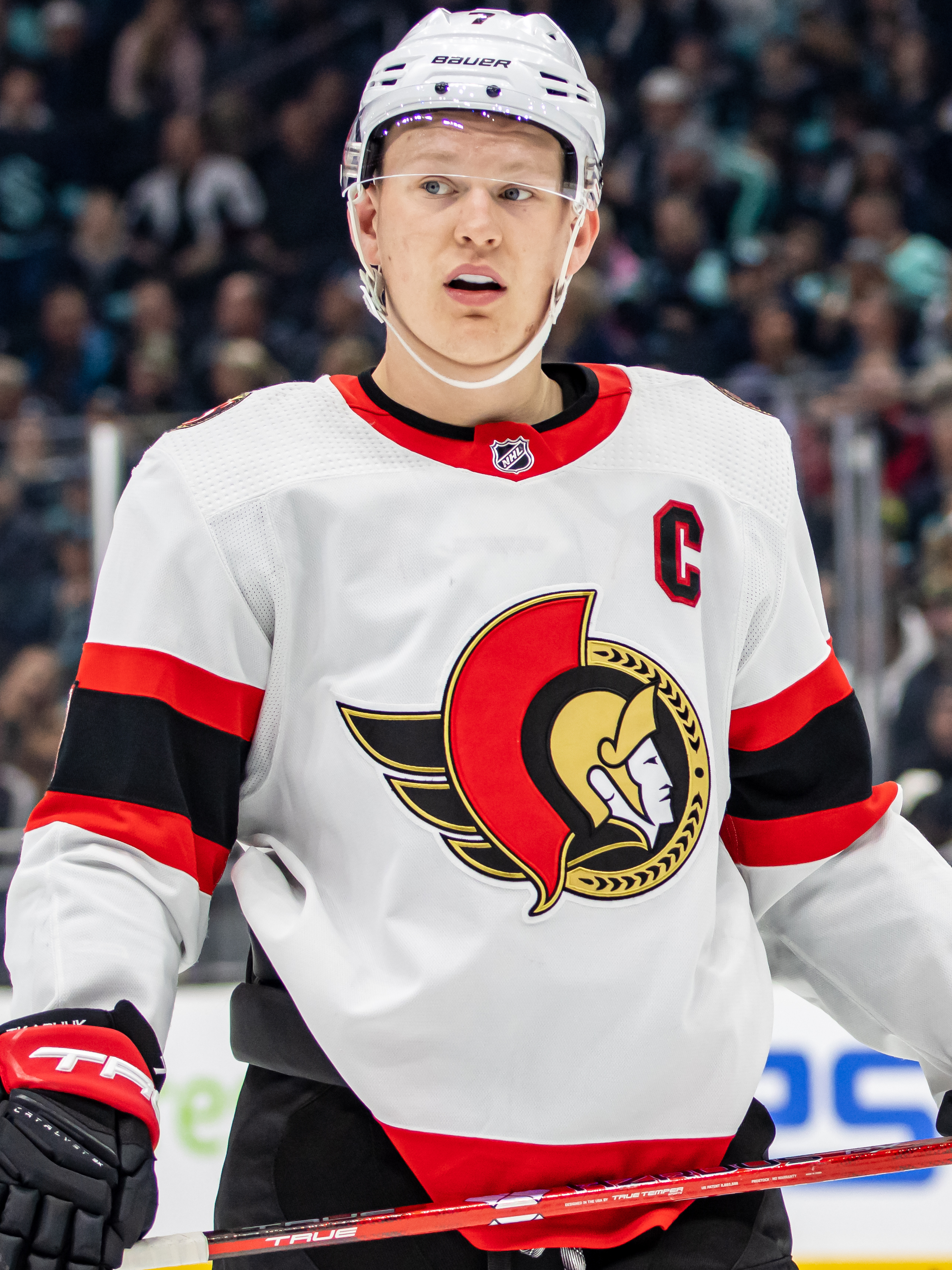
Brady Tkachuk

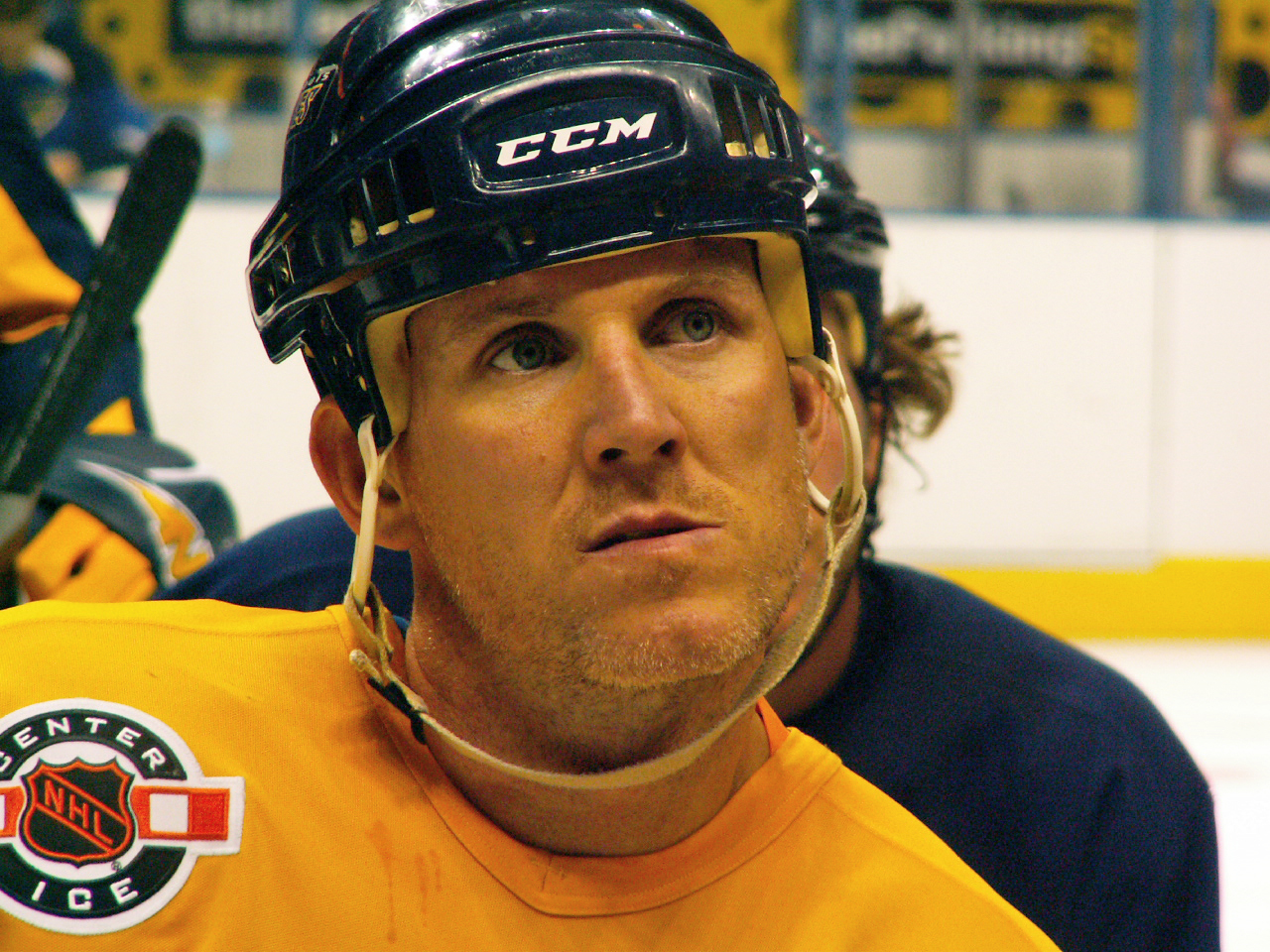
Keith Tkachuk

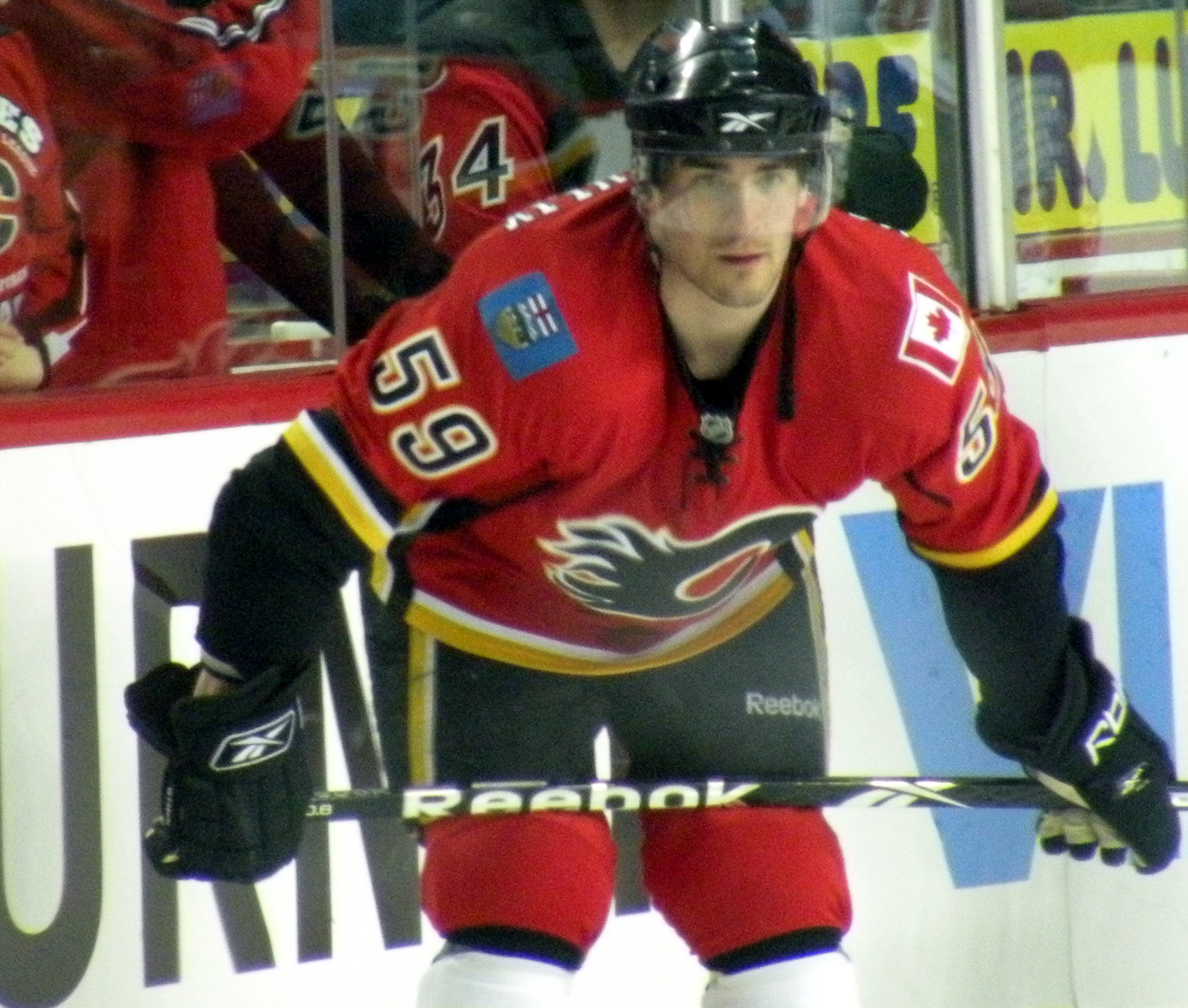
David Van der Gulik

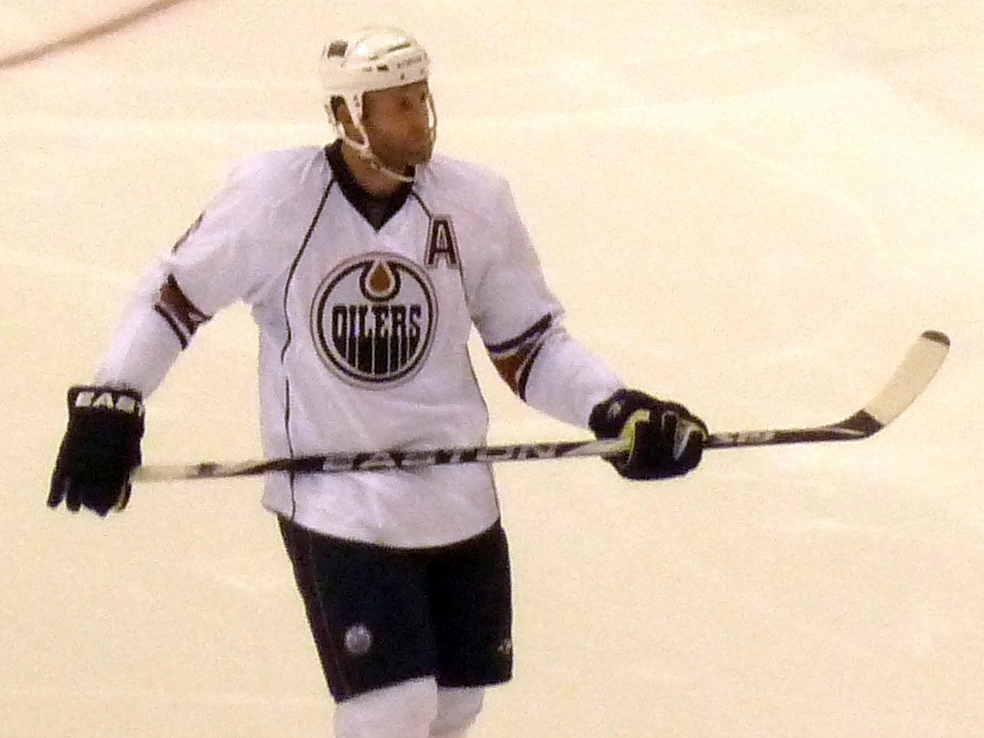
Ryan Whitney

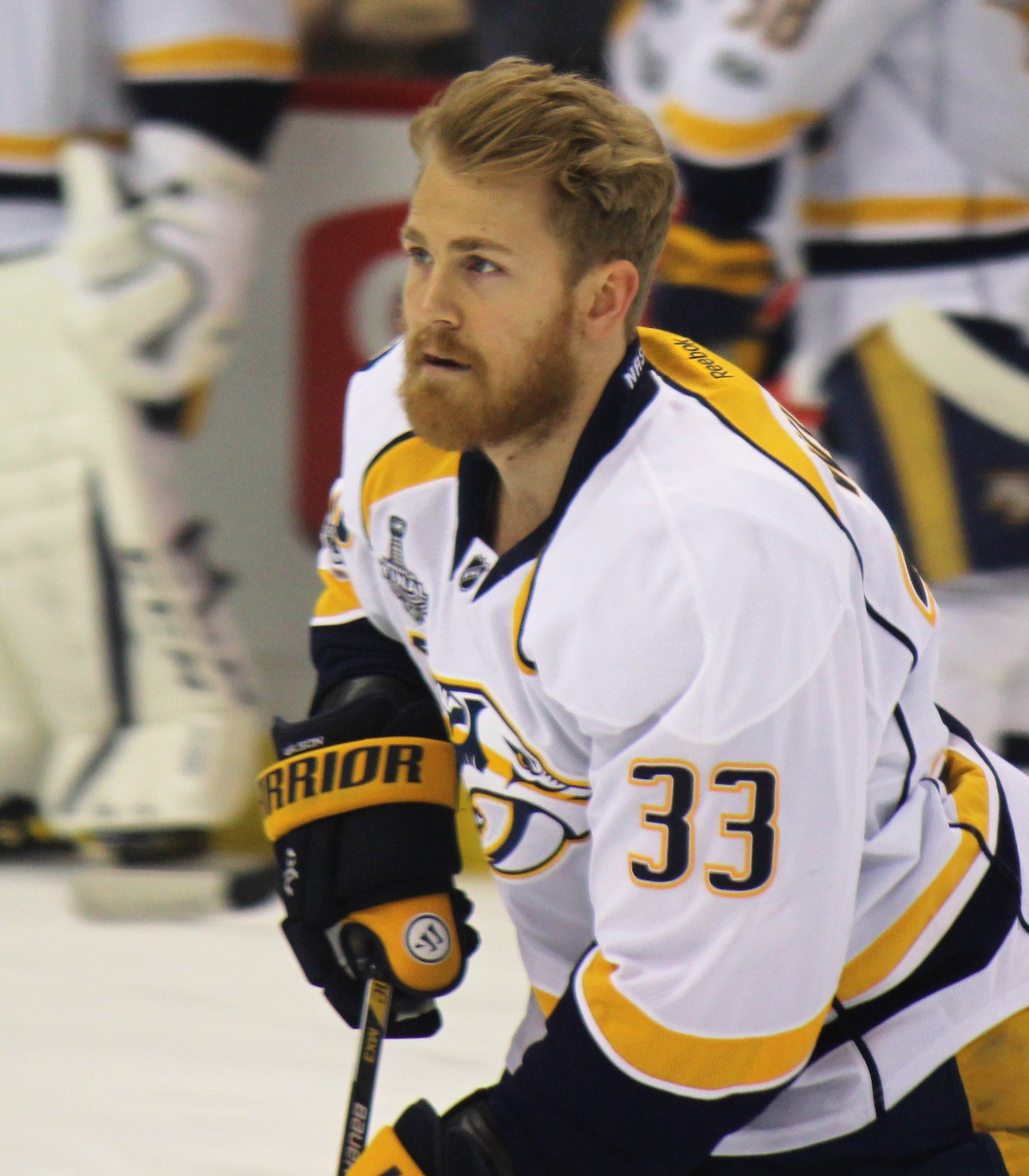
Colin Wilson

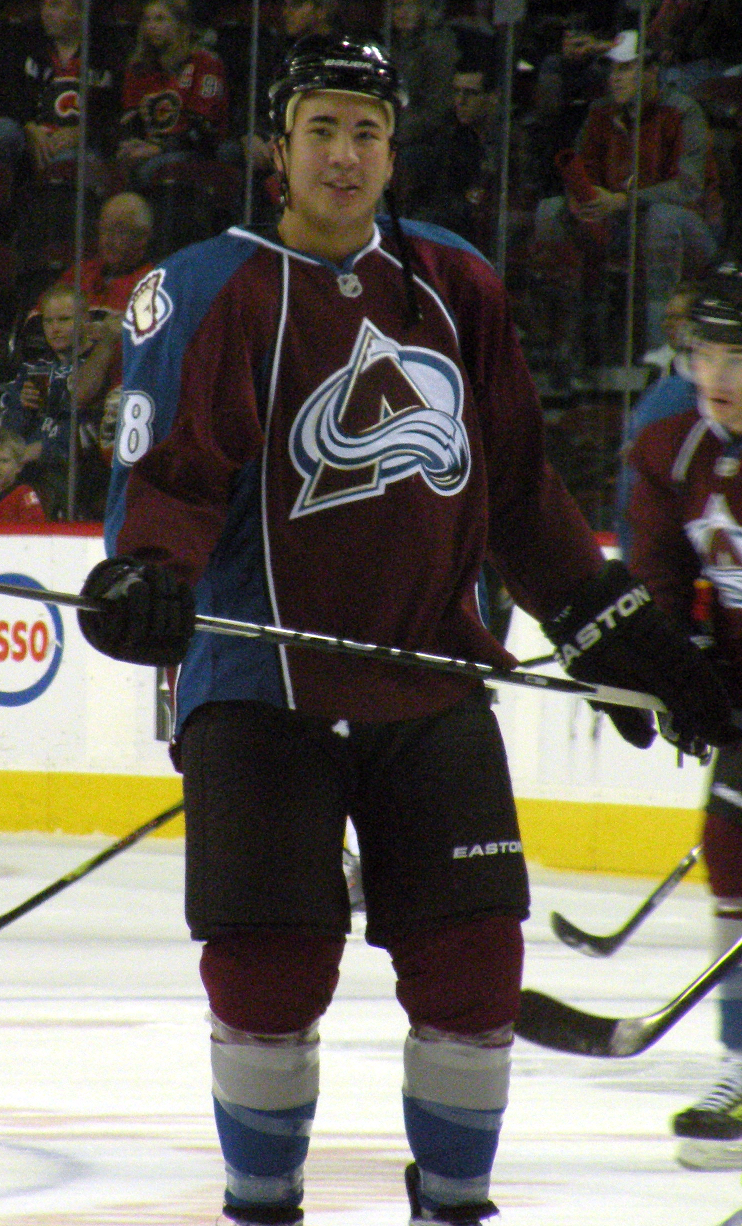
Brandon Yip

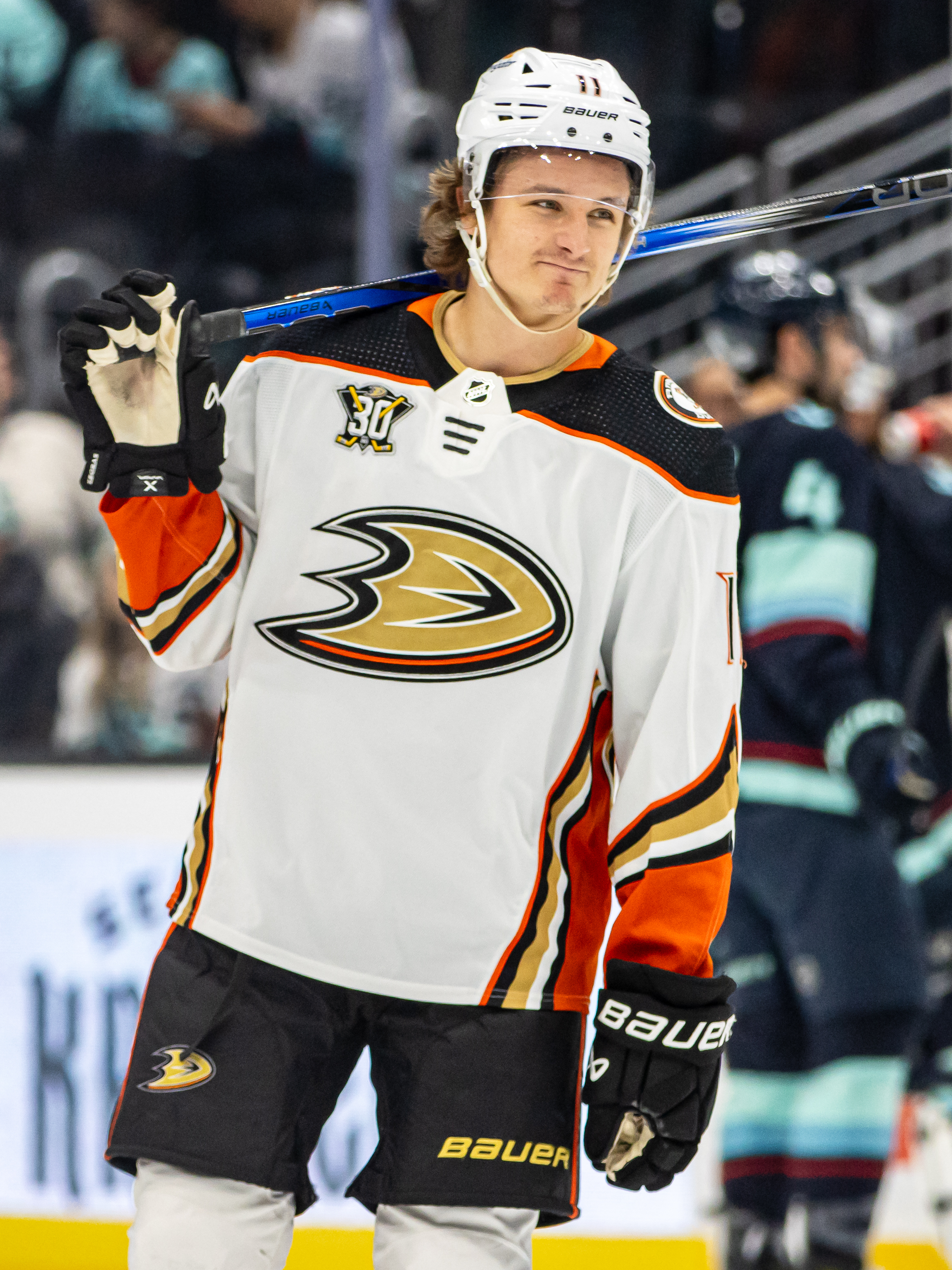
Trevor Zegras

== Terriers in the U.S. Hockey Hall of Fame ==
- Tony Amonte
- Jim Craig
- Mike Eruzione
- Jack Garrity
- Jack Kelley
- Jack O'Callahan
- Jack Parker
- Dave Silk
- Keith Tkachuk
- Scott Young

Craig, Eruzione, O'Callahan and Silk were inducted as members of the 1980 U.S. Olympic hockey team.

== NHL first round draft picks ==
The Terriers have had twenty four players who were chosen in the first round of the NHL Entry Draft as of the 2025-2026 season:

- David Quinn 1984, 13th Overall
- Scott Young 1986, 11th Overall
- Keith Tkachuk 1990, 19th Overall
- Scott Lachance 1991, 4th Overall
- Jeff Kealty 1994, 22nd Overall
- Rick DiPietro 2000, 1st Overall
- Ryan Whitney 2002, 5th Overall
- Kevin Shattenkirk 2007, 14th Overall
- Colin Wilson 2008, 7th Overall
- Charlie Coyle 2010, 28th Overall
- Jack Eichel 2015, 2nd Overall
- Clayton Keller 2016, 7th Overall
- Charlie McAvoy 2016, 14th Overall
- Dante Fabbro 2016, 17th Overall
- Kieffer Bellows 2016, 19th Overall
- Jake Oettinger 2017, 26th Overall
- Shane Bowers 2017, 28th Overall
- Brady Tkachuk 2018, 4th Overall
- Joel Farabee 2018, 14th Overall
- Jay O'Brien 2018, 19th Overall
- Trevor Zegras 2019, 9th Overall
- Tyler Boucher 2021, 10th Overall
- Tom Willander 2023, 11th Overall
- Macklin Celebrini 2024, 1st Overall
- Cole Eiserman 2024, 20th Overall
- Caleb Malhotra 2026, 3rd Overall
- Tynan Lawrence 2026, 11th Overall

== Agganis Arena ==
BU plays its home games at Agganis Arena (capacity 6,150) in Boston, Massachusetts. The hockey rink at the arena is named Jack Parker Rink after the team's longtime coach. Agganis Arena first opened its doors on January 3, 2005, for a hockey game versus the University of Minnesota. The student section at BU, also known as “The Dog Pound,” is located in sections 117–119 and 107–109 at Agganis Arena.

== See also ==
- Boston University Terriers women's ice hockey
