= Waiver (disambiguation) =

A waiver is a voluntary relinquishment or surrender of some known right or privilege.

Waiver or waivers may also refer to:

- Waivers (sports), a type of player transaction common to the four North American major league sports:
  - Waivers (NFL)
  - Waivers (NHL)
  - Waivers (MLB)
  - Waivers (NBA)
- Executive waiver, an administrative tool of the Executive Branch in the U.S.
- Forfeiture and waiver, concepts used by the United States court system
- Whitewash waiver, proposed resolution regarding stockholder rights
- Liability waiver, such as pre-accident releases
- Damage waiver, optional collision coverage when renting a vehicle

== See also ==
- List of types of waivers
