= List of types of waivers =

This is a list of types of Waivers

== United States government ==
- Visa Waiver Program, U.S. government system, allowing citizens of other countries to travel to the United States
- United States Waiver of Inadmissibility, application for legal entry to the United States
- Moral waiver, allows acceptance of a recruit into the U.S. military services
- Felony waiver, special permission to allow a U.S. military recruit who has a felony on their record
- Forfeiture and waiver, concepts used by the United States court system

== Other uses ==
- Visa waiver agreement, various schemes by governments offering visa waivers
- Florida Medicaid waiver, covering medical supports and services
- Whitewash waiver, proposed resolution regarding stockholder rights
- Liability waiver, such as pre-accident releases
- Damage waiver, optional collision coverage when renting a vehicle
