= Robin Lehner =

Swedish ice hockey player (born 1991)

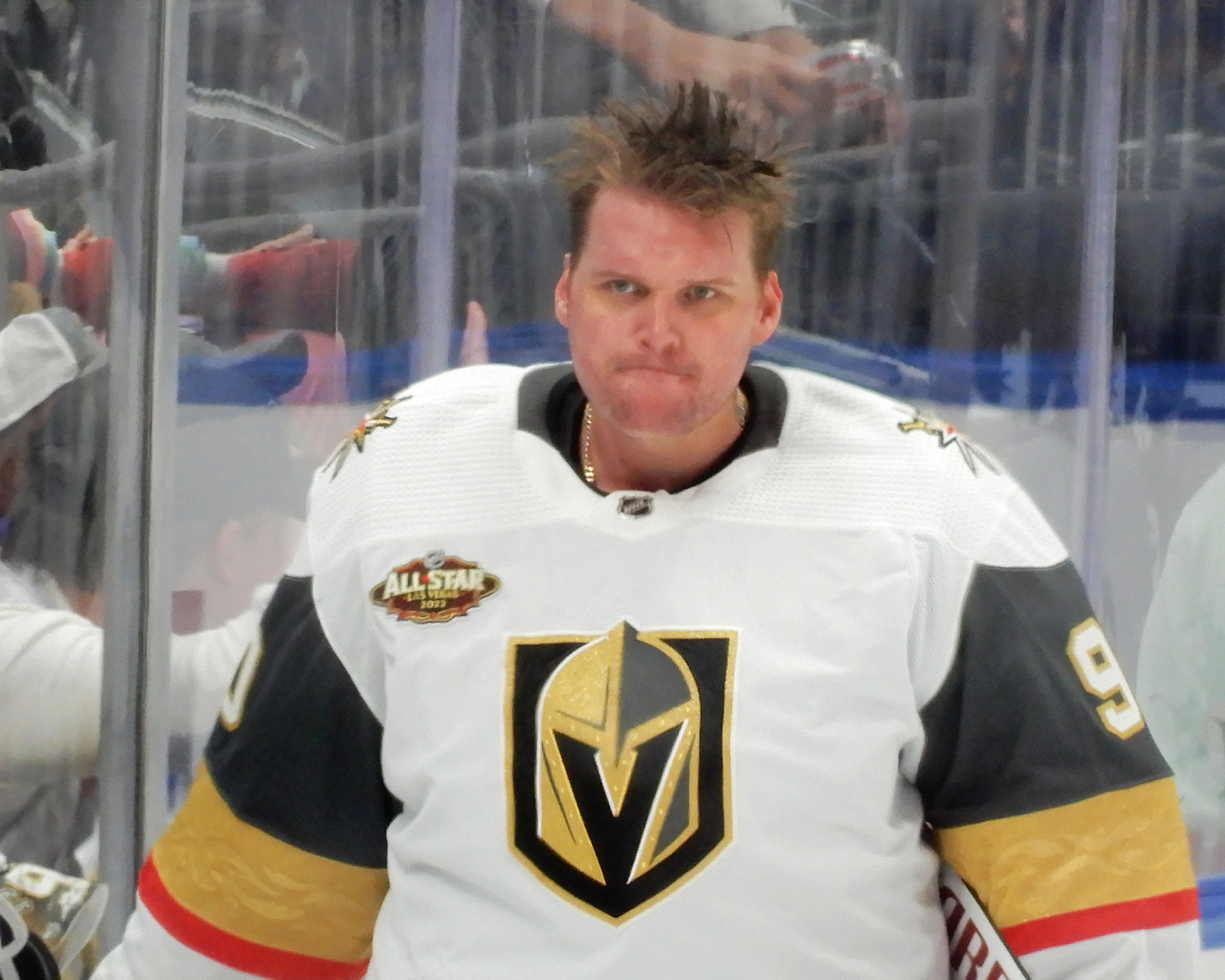
- Lehner with the Vegas Golden Knights in 2021
- Born: 24 July 1991 (age 35) Gothenburg, Sweden
- Height: 6 ft 4 in (193 cm)
- Weight: 250 lb (113 kg; 17 st 12 lb)
- Position: Goaltender
- Caught: Left
- Played for: Ottawa Senators; Buffalo Sabres; New York Islanders; Chicago Blackhawks; Vegas Golden Knights
- NHL draft: 46th overall, 2009; Ottawa Senators
- Playing career: 2009–2022

Robin Lehner (born 24 July 1991), nicknamed "Panda", is a Swedish former professional ice hockey player. A goaltender, he played in the National Hockey League (NHL) for the Ottawa Senators, Buffalo Sabres, New York Islanders, Chicago Blackhawks and Vegas Golden Knights. The Senators selected Lehner in the second round, 46th overall, of the 2009 NHL entry draft.

Born in Gothenburg, Sweden, Lehner learned how to goaltend from his father, who personally coached Henrik Lundqvist, and began playing hockey in the J20 SuperElit league. In 2009, he turned down an opportunity to back up Frölunda HC goaltender Johan Holmqvist in the Swedish Hockey League, opting instead to move to North America, where he had an Ontario Hockey League (OHL) record five shutout appearances for the Sault Ste. Marie Greyhounds during the 2009–10 season. After one year in the OHL, Lehner joined Ottawa's American Hockey League affiliate, the Binghamton Senators, with whom he won the 2011 Calder Cup. When he debuted with Ottawa in 2010, Lehner became the youngest goaltender in franchise history, as well as the youngest Swedish goaltender to appear in an NHL game. Complications from the 2012–13 NHL lockout delayed Lehner's rise to the NHL, but he found a permanent spot in Ottawa's lineup by the 2013–14 season. In 2015, the Senators traded Lehner to Buffalo, where, despite putting up solid save percentages through three seasons, he was plagued by inconsistency, and his overall record was limited by a poor Buffalo offence.

Lehner left a game in March 2018 with what was later revealed to be a panic attack, caused by undiagnosed bipolar disorder and an alcohol addiction that had begun when he sustained a concussion in Ottawa. After spending time at a drug rehabilitation facility, Lehner signed a one-year contract with the Islanders for the 2018-19 season, which culminated in his first William M. Jennings Trophy, an award he shared with teammate Thomas Greiss. Lehner also won the Bill Masterton Trophy and finished third in Vezina voting. In New York, Chicago, and Vegas, Lehner often platooned the goaltending role with another veteran, such as Greiss, Corey Crawford, or Marc-André Fleury. When Fleury was abruptly traded to the Blackhawks prior to the 2021–22 season, Lehner became the Golden Knights' starting goaltender. Lehner missed the entire 2022–23 season after a hip surgery in August 2022, and also missed the 2023–24 season. After he failed to report to a medical exam prior to the 2024–25 season, the Golden Knights agreed to a $4.4 million salary payout for that year and cut him from the team. Lehner has not played in the NHL since.

Off the ice, Lehner has become an advocate for open discussion of mental health, addiction, drug addiction, and trauma, particularly within the world of ice hockey. While Lehner represented Sweden at the 2009 IIHF World U18 Championships and the 2011 World Junior Ice Hockey Championships, physical and mental health issues have prevented him from attending future international tournaments, including the 2022 Winter Olympics.

== Early life ==
Lehner was born on 24 July 1991 in Gothenburg, Sweden, to parents Michael and Veronica Lehner. Originally an association football player, Lehner made the switch to ice hockey at the age of 10, and was coached by his father. Michael, a mixed martial artist with no goaltending experience, had been asked to train future National Hockey League (NHL) player Henrik Lundqvist; whom Robin had idolized around the same time as he expressed an interest in learning the position, and so Robin was often asked to try out drills meant for Lundqvist. The intensity of Michael Lehner's training regimen created a strained relationship between father and son that reconciled with adulthood. Lehner briefly attended high school in Sweden, but chose to drop out at the age of 14 after deciding that the public education system "did not work" for him.

== Playing career ==
=== Amateur ===
Lehner's amateur career began with the J20 SuperElit division of the Swedish Frölunda HC, with whom he had an opportunity to back up Johan Holmqvist in the Swedish Hockey League (SHL) if he could impress in the under-20 team. In 22 games with Frölunda during the 2008–09 season, Lehner had a 3.05 goals against average and a .916 save percentage. Although he was offered the position backing up Holmqvist for the 2009–10 SHL season, Lehner had already contemplated quitting ice hockey after extra blood vessels in his hamstring caused him acute pain on the ice. He was only inspired to continue after he and his father took a trip to New York to see Henrik Lundqvist play for the New York Rangers. That experience inspired Lehner to continue his career in a North American junior ice hockey program.

Coming off of his Swedish junior season, the NHL Central Scouting Bureau ranked Lehner the top European goaltender available in the 2009 NHL entry draft. The Ottawa Senators, who had acquired an additional second-round draft pick in a larger goaltending trade with the Columbus Blue Jackets, used that extra pick to select Lehner 46th overall in the 2009 draft. More immediately, the Sault Ste. Marie Greyhounds of the Ontario Hockey League (OHL) selected Lehner ninth overall in the 2009 CHL Import Draft, and he moved to Ontario to join the team for their 2009–10 season. Despite missing time in November after contracting the H1N1 influenza virus during the 2009 swine flu pandemic, Lehner's one season with Sault Ste. Marie was a success, with a 27–13–3 record, 2.88 GAA, and .918 save percentage. His five OHL shutouts were also a league record, shared with Chris Carrozzi and Patrick Killeen, breaking Ray Emery's four-shutout season in 2001–02.

=== Professional ===
==== Ottawa Senators (2010–2015) ====
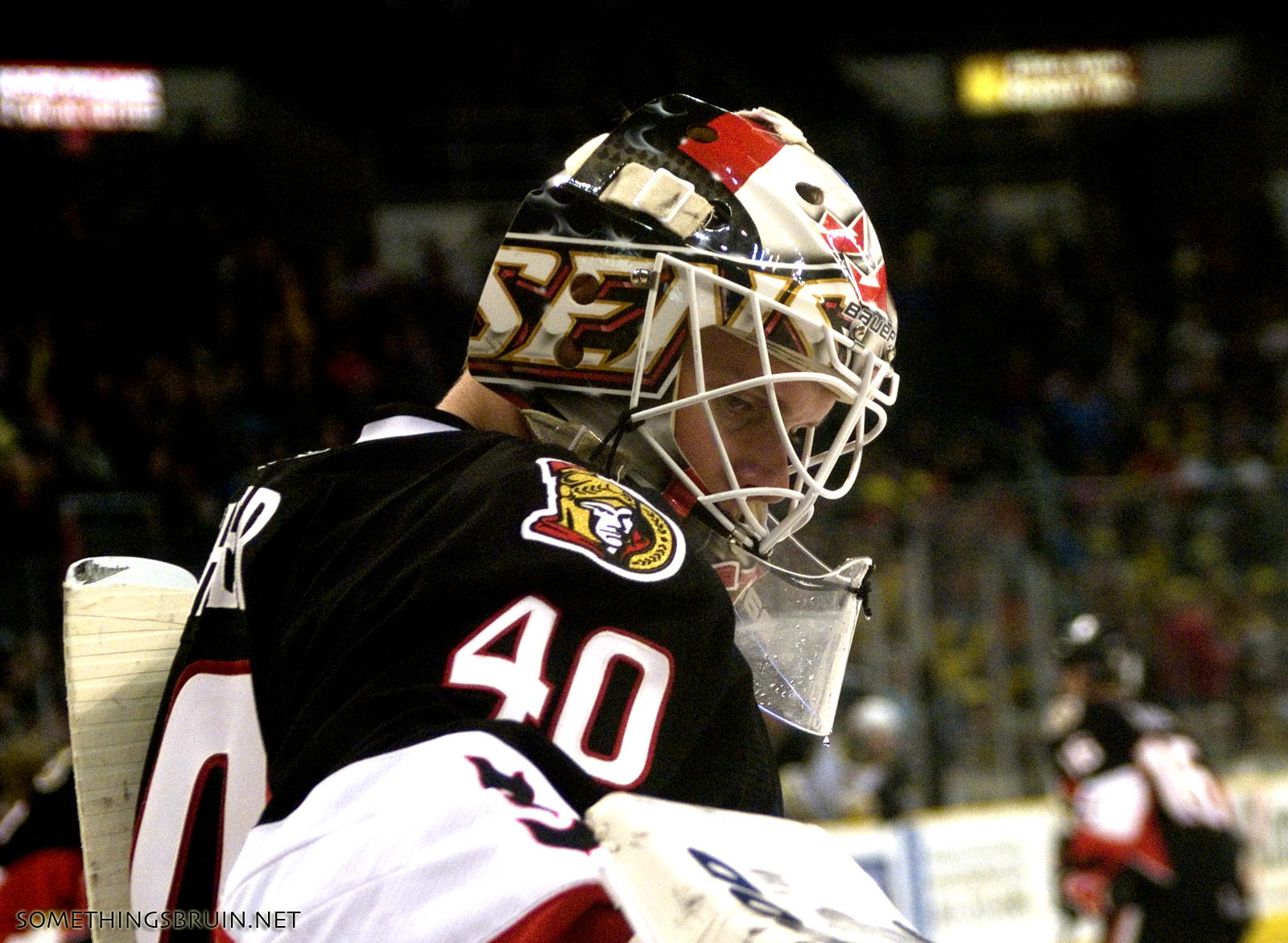
Lehner with the Binghamton Senators in 2011

Upon the conclusion of the Greyhounds' season, Lehner signed a three-year, entry-level contract with the Senators, and he closed out the 2009–10 hockey season with the Binghamton Senators, Ottawa's American Hockey League (AHL) affiliate. He made his professional ice hockey debut on 9 April 2010, making 21 saves in a 6–5 victory over the Syracuse Crunch. He also won his only other start with Binghamton that year, making 31 saves in a 3–1 defeat of the Wilkes-Barre/Scranton Penguins.

Although he was scheduled to open the 2010–11 season in Binghamton, injuries to both Ottawa's starting goaltender Pascal Leclaire and top prospect Mike Brodeur forced the Senators to call Lehner up to the NHL as a backup for Brian Elliott. He made his NHL debut on 16 October 2010, stopping all three shots he faced in the five minutes at the start of the third period during which Elliott needed to repair his broken skate blade. Only 19 years old at the time, Lehner became both the youngest goaltender in Senators history and the youngest Swedish goaltender to appear in an NHL game in his debut. Lehner returned to Binghamton on 1 November and remained there until 12 January 2011, when he was once again called to fill in for an injured Leclaire. He made his first NHL start the next day, taking the win with 20 saves in a 6–4 victory over the New York Islanders and breaking a six-game losing streak for Ottawa. While Lehner only spent eight games in Ottawa, he spent an additional 22 in Binghamton, where he went 10–8–2 with a 2.70 GAA as a backup for Barry Brust. Brust started the first four games of Binghamton's 2011 postseason run, but after falling 3–1 in a seven-game series against the Manchester Monarchs, he was pulled in favour of Lehner, who completed the 4–3 series comeback and carried them through to the next playoff round. With a 14–4 record, 2.10 GAA, .939 save percentage, and three shutouts in 19 postseason appearances, Lehner received the Jack A. Butterfield Trophy as the AHL postseason MVP for his role in Binghamton's first Calder Cup championship.

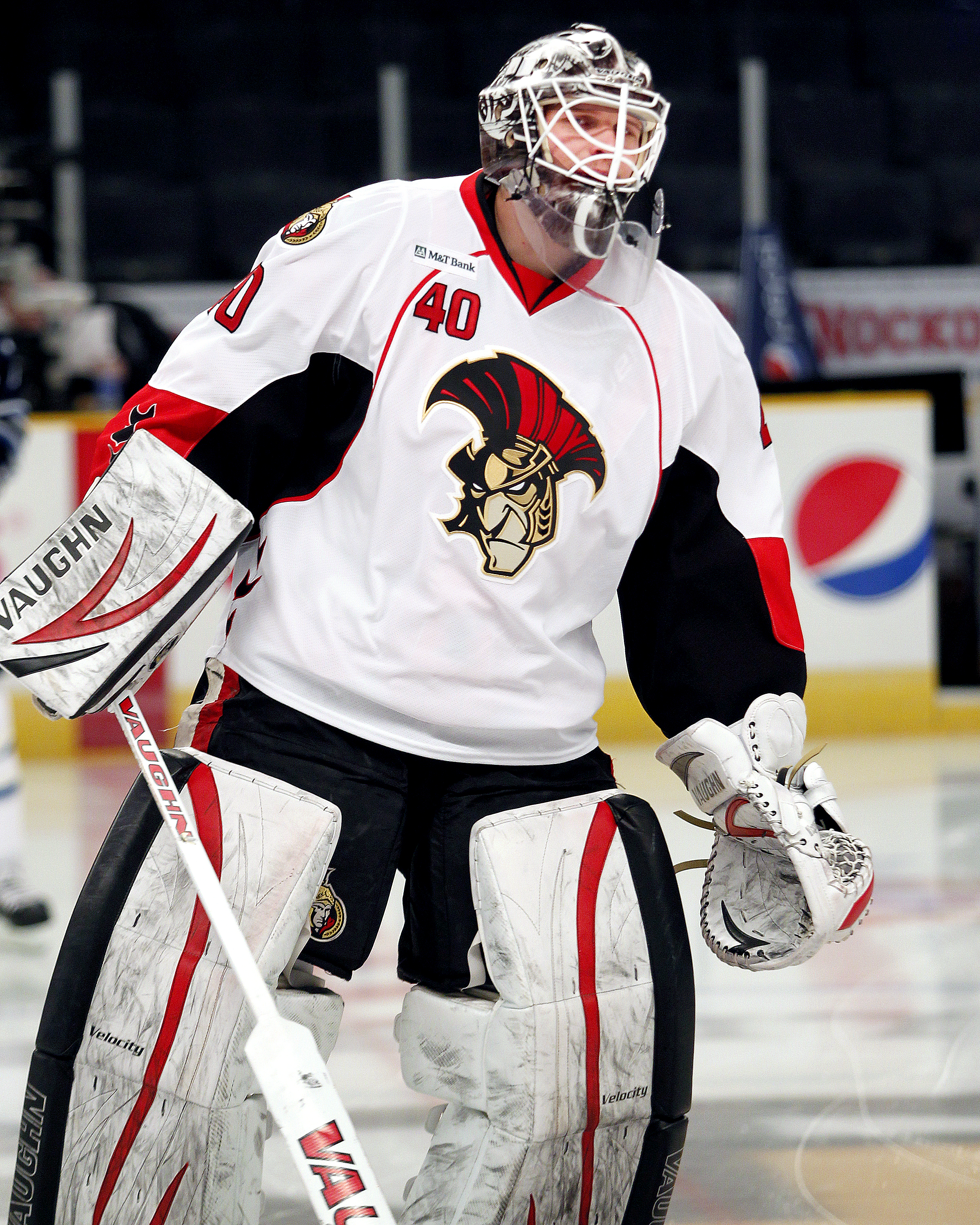
Lehner at the 2013 AHL All-Star Classic

Lehner spent most of the 2011–12 season in Binghamton, with a few emergency call-ups to the NHL. First, he was promoted at the end of October to replace an injured Alex Auld, making one appearance in a win over the Toronto Maple Leafs before being sent down again on 4 November. Lehner expected a longer call-up on 23 February after starter Craig Anderson slashed his hand open in a cooking incident, an injury that required surgery and extended recovery time, but he was sent back down on 5 March to allow Ben Bishop a chance to skate in the NHL. In the midst of this second call-up, Lehner received his first NHL shutout, stopping all 32 shots against him in a 1–0 defeat of the Boston Bruins. That season, he played five games in Ottawa, going 3–2–0 in the process, and 40 games with Binghamton. He finished the year with a 3.26 GAA and .907 save percentage, but was overshadowed by teammate Mike McKenna's AHL presence.

While the 2012–13 NHL lockout postponed the start of the regular 2012–13 season, the concurrent AHL season continued as planned, and Lehner returned to Binghamton to wait out the lockout. There, he participated in the AHL All-Star Classic, goaltending for the Eastern Conference team in their 7–6 loss to the West By the time that the lockout ended in January, Lehner was second among AHL goaltenders with a 0.945 save percentage, and was third in the league with a 1.90 GAA. He expected that he would return to Ottawa when the NHL season picked back up, but after Anderson impressed his coaches in training camp, Lehner was sent back down to Binghamton, as unlike other backup Ben Bishop, he would not have to clear waivers before returning to the AHL. Ottawa faced a number of injuries within the first month of the season, however, and Lehner was called up on 22 February when Anderson sprained his right ankle. In 12 NHL starts during the lockout-protracted season, Lehner had a .936 save percentage and a 2.20 GAA, his impact on the ice limited only by Anderson's presence. He also appeared in 31 AHL games, during which he had a .938 save percentage and a 2.12 GAA. Lehner also made his first NHL postseason appearance in Game 2 of the 2013 Eastern Conference Semifinals, where he and Anderson were on the receiving end of a Sidney Crosby hat-trick in a 4–3 defeat to the Pittsburgh Penguins.

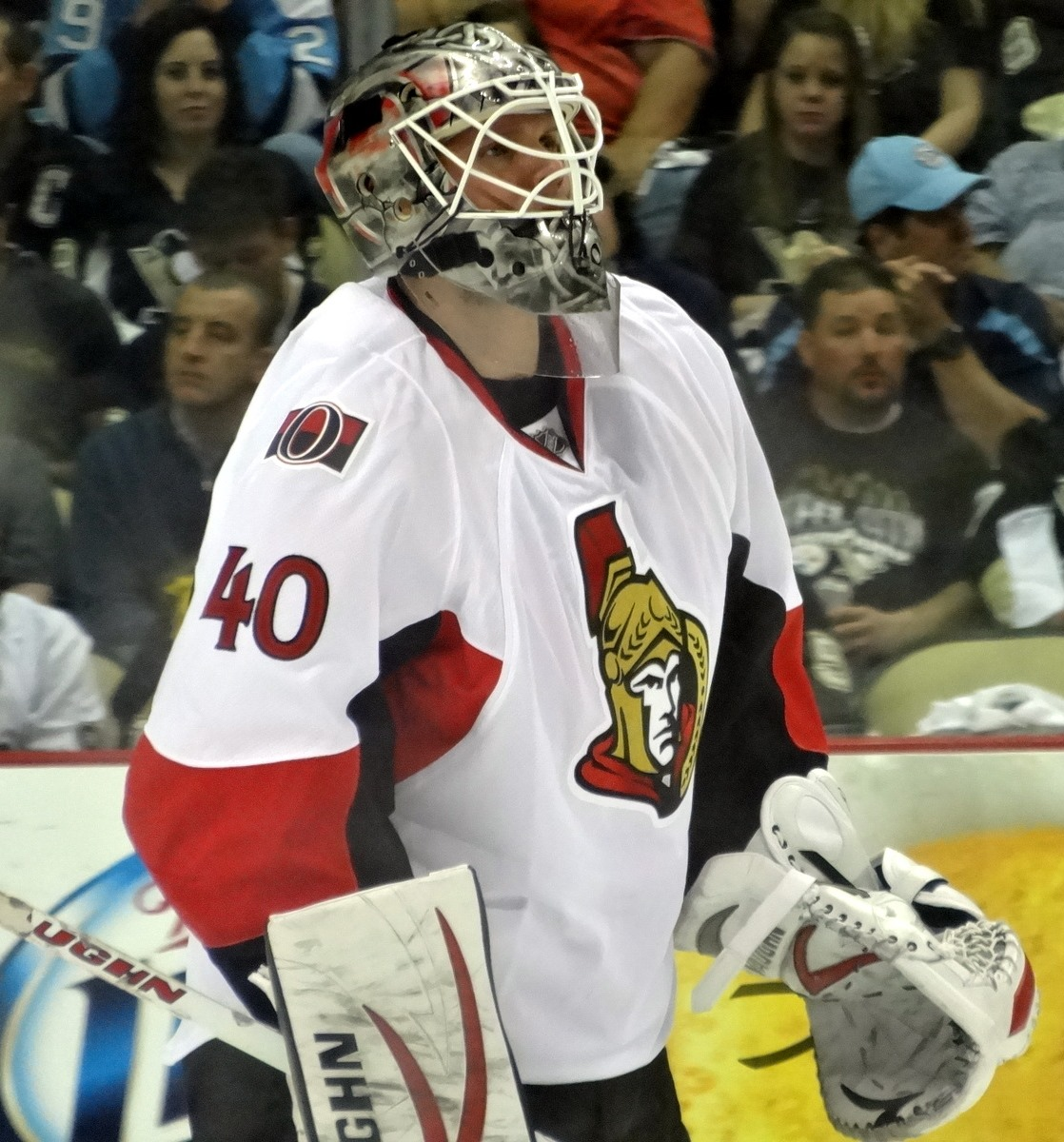
Lehner with the Senators during the 2013 Stanley Cup playoffs

Lehner opened a season in the NHL for the first time in 2013–14, serving as a full-time backup for Anderson. When Anderson was sidelined with a neck injury at the start of November. Lehner delivered three wins in his absence, posting a 1.33 GAA and .958 save percentage and taking home the First Star of the Week for the week ending 11 November. Anderson's poor performance upon his return to the lineup led to calls that he be replaced with Lehner as the new starting goaltender, but Lehner did not receive an opportunity to take over again until March, when Anderson suffered a shoulder injury. Not receiving regular playing time made it difficult for Lehner to adjust to the starting role: between Anderson's two injuries, Lehner played in only 18 games. In the 36 games that Lehner did play during the 2013–14 season, he went 12–15–6 compared to Anderson's 25–16–8, but their other metrics were comparable: Lehner had a GAA of 3.06 compared to 3.00 for Anderson, while his .913 save percentage was only .002 higher than Anderson's.

On 31 July 2014, the Senators signed Lehner to a three-year, $7 million contract extension. The following month, Anderson also signed a contract extension, quelling rumours that the Senators planned to replace him with Lehner within two years. They received equal playing time through the first 10 games of the 2014–15 season, but beginning in November, Anderson received more starting time, relegating Lehner back into a backup role. That February, both Lehner and forward Clarke MacArthur suffered concussions when they collided during a game against the Carolina Hurricanes. The incident effectively ended Lehner's season, as he continued to experience concussion symptoms for the next five months, well into the offseason. While he had already had difficulties with alcohol abuse, the effects of the concussion exacerbated Lehner's drinking problem, which would follow him for the next three years. For the 25 games in which he saw action before the concussion, Lehner was 9–12–3 with a 3.02 GAA and a .905 save percentage.

==== Buffalo Sabres (2015–2018) ====
On 26 June 2015, the Buffalo Sabres, who lacked a starting goaltender for the 2015–16 season, traded the 21st overall pick in the 2015 NHL entry draft to Ottawa in exchange for Lehner. Ottawa used their new draft pick that night to select Colin White. While facing his old team in the Sabres' season opener on 8 October, Lehner was injured in the second period and needed to be carried off the ice. Medical tests revealed that he had sprained his right ankle and would miss anywhere from six to ten weeks of game time. In the interim, Chad Johnson was promoted to starting goaltender, while Nathan Lieuwen was called up from the AHL. Lehner returned on 16 January 2016, making 27 saves in a 4–1 loss to the Boston Bruins. His third career shutout and first with Buffalo came on 19 February, when Lehner stopped all 38 shots in a 4–0 victory over the Columbus Blue Jackets. In the third period of his shutout game, Lehner was involved in a fight that began when Columbus forward Boone Jenner delivered a hit on Buffalo defenceman Zach Bogosian. Engaging primarily with the Blue Jackets' Jack Johnson, Lehner received two minor penalties, one for roughing and another for leaving the goaltending crease. Lehner's ankle continued to bother him even after he was reinstated from the injured list, and he underwent a season-ending surgery for the injury on 30 March. Limited to only 21 games, Lehner went 5–9–5 with a .924 save percentage and a 2.47 GAA during his first season with Buffalo.

During the 2016 free agent signing period, Buffalo acquired Anders Nilsson from the St. Louis Blues as a backup for Lehner during the 2016–17 season. That same offseason, Lehner took up mixed martial arts in order to lose weight and improve his speed on the ice. Although Lehner had a .914 save percentage and 2.66 GAA in November, poor offence from Buffalo meant that the goaltender was 1–6–3 in that ten-game stretch, and fans began calling for Nilsson to receive more playing time. His frustration mounted as the season progressed, and following a 4–2 loss to the Toronto Maple Leafs in February, Lehner lashed out at his teammates, saying that their style of play was "disrespectful", particularly towards coach Dan Bylsma, who "is drawing it up there, coming up with good game plans and we do the exact opposite". Around the time of the outburst, Lehner had a 2.47 GAA and was third among NHL starting goaltenders with a .926 save percentage, but was only 17–16–6 for the season. That March, Lehner made his 48th season appearance as a goaltender, breaking his previous record, set in the OHL, of appearances in one season. While Buffalo finished in last place in the Atlantic Division with a 33–37–12 record, Lehner went 23–26–8 for the season with a 2.68 GAA and a .920 save percentage. He was also third in the NHL with 1,758 saves and set career highs with 59 games played, 23 wins, and two shutouts.

A restricted free agent following the 2016–17 season, Lehner signed a one-year, $4 million contract extension with Buffalo on 25 July 2017. Lehner suffered many of the same issues during the 2017–18 season as he had the year prior, with poor Buffalo offence leading to losses despite his strong goaltending efforts, particularly at the KeyBank Center. Through the first 13 home games of the season, Lehner's 1.94 GAA was the best in the NHL, while his .935 save percentage was tied with Braden Holtby, but he had only a 4–7–1 record in that time frame. Despite rumours that Lehner would be moved at the NHL trading deadline that February, the only move made by general manager Jason Botterill was to send Evander Kane to the San Jose Sharks. Lehner, meanwhile, rebuked rumours that he had requested a trade, telling reporters, "I have no reason not to want to be here", even despite the team's struggles. By the end of the season, the Sabres, already well out of playoff contention, were carrying three goaltenders: Lehner, Johnson, and Linus Ullmark, who was called up to gain some NHL experience before returning to the Rochester Americans for a potential AHL playoff bid. The move coincided with a hip injury that forced Buffalo to shut Lehner down for the season at the end of March. Lehner suddenly left his last game with Buffalo on 29 March with what was later revealed to be a panic attack. At the time, he had been suffering from substance abuse issues caused by undiagnosed mental illness, and shortly after suffering the on-ice panic attack, Lehner was sent to a drug rehabilitation facility to recover. He went 14–26–9 for the season, with a 3.01 GAA and .908 save percentage. On 22 June 2018, the Sabres opted not to give Lehner a qualifying offer, leaving him an unrestricted free agent.

==== New York Islanders (2018–2019) ====
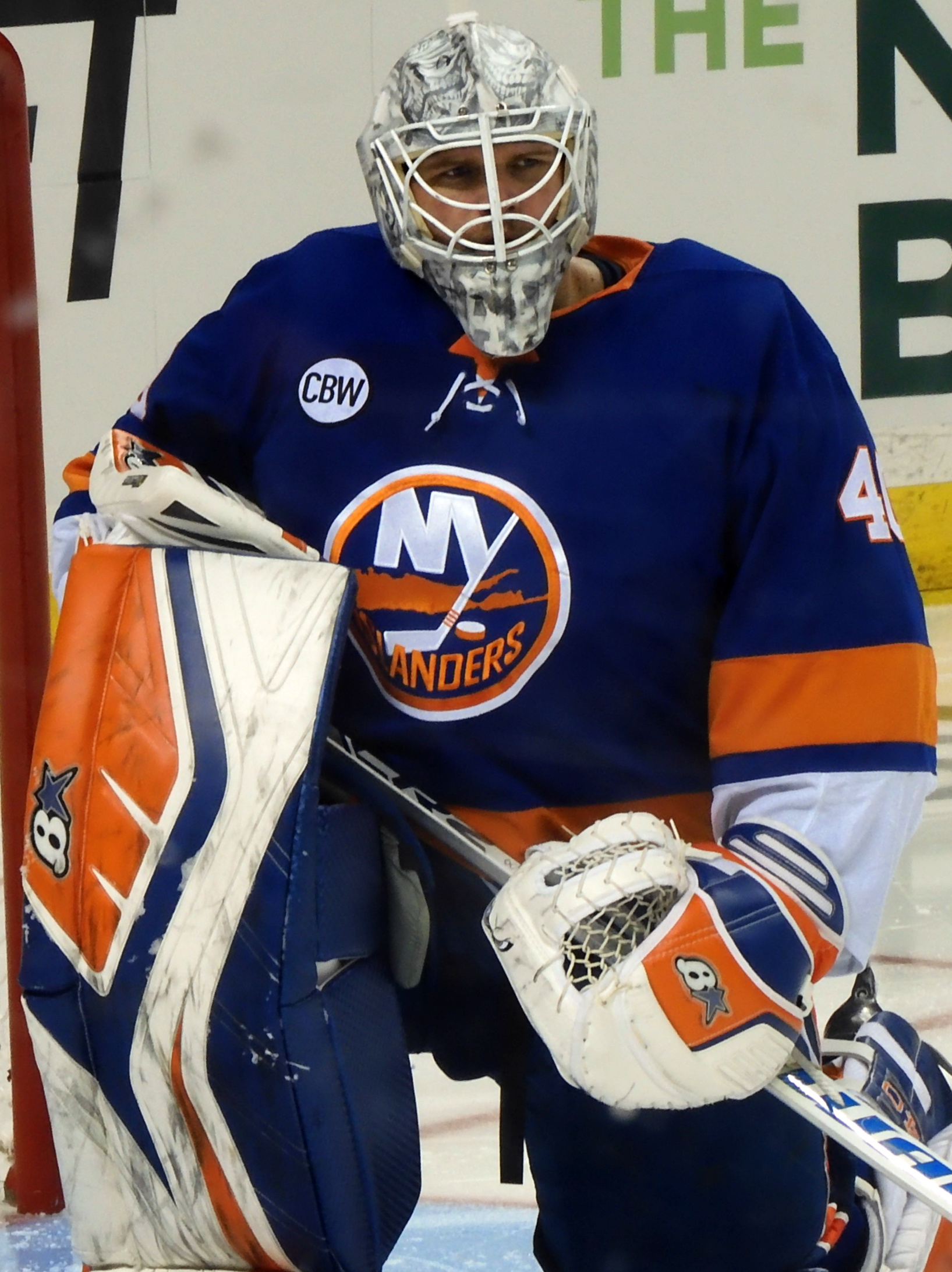
Lehner with the Islanders in 2019

The New York Islanders, who were seeking a complementary goaltender to Thomas Greiss following Jaroslav Halák's departure in free agency, signed Lehner to a one-year contract worth $1.5 million on 4 July 2018. In his season debut on 8 October, Lehner stopped all 35 shots he faced from the San Jose Sharks, becoming the first Islanders goaltender to record a shutout in their first game for the team. While Lehner's openness about his history of addiction made him a fan favorite on Long Island, he also put together the best year of his career up until that point, going 25–13–5 with a 2.13 GAA, .930 save percentage, and six shutouts. At the end of the regular season, Lehner and Greiss won the William M. Jennings Trophy, given to the goaltending staff of the NHL team that allows the fewest regular-season goals. The Islanders dropped from allowing 296 goals in the 2017–18 season to only 196 in 2018–19. Lehner was also a finalist for the Vezina Trophy, given to the best goaltender in the NHL, and won the Bill Masterton Memorial Trophy, awarded for "perseverance, sportsmanship and dedication to hockey". When the trophy arrived in August, it mistakenly listed Lehner as a member of the New York Rangers rather than the Islanders.

In the 2019 Stanley Cup playoffs, Lehner was instrumental in the Islanders' first-round sweep of the Pittsburgh Penguins. He stopped 130 shots in 136 attempts during the four-game series, including 32 saves in New York's 3–1 elimination game victory. He was less effective during the second round, when the Islanders faced the Carolina Hurricanes. After dropping the first three games in that series, coach Barry Trotz allowed Lehner to start in Game 4, but pulled him in favour of Greiss after Lehner allowed three goals in the first 25 minutes of the game. The Hurricanes took the game 5–2 to complete the sweep and eliminate the Islanders from the playoffs.

==== Chicago Blackhawks (2019–2020) ====
When the window opened on 23 June 2019 for impending unrestricted free agents to begin courting offers from other teams, Lehner told Newsday that he planned to re-sign with the Islanders and had no interest in speaking to representatives from other teams. That week, the Islanders offered Lehner a two-year contract, but when the goaltender expressed his desire to find a longer-term deal, negotiations fell through. Within hours of the free agency period opening at 12 p.m. (ET) on 1 July, Lehner signed a one-year, $5 million contract with the Chicago Blackhawks. New York, meanwhile, replaced Lehner with free agent Semyon Varlamov, who they signed to a four-year, $20 million contract the same day.

Rather than having Lehner back up Corey Crawford or unseat him as Chicago's starting goaltender, head coach Jeremy Colliton decided to platoon the pair, giving both men roughly equal playing time. Although Lehner was adept in net during regulation, leading the league with regular save percentage by the end of November, he frequently struggled in shootout situations. By 10 December, Lehner's career .510 shootout save percentage was the lowest of any goaltender in NHL history who had faced 40 or more shots, and he suggested that, should he start a game that turns into a shootout situation, Crawford take over goaltending duties for that portion of the game. On 29 December 2019, Lehner, who altered his goaltending technique and claimed to have been distracted by a story that teammate Zack Smith told him beforehand, won his first shootout of the season, stopping two out of three shots from the Columbus Blue Jackets. After 15 January, Lehner found himself on the bench more frequently, and the accompanying downturn in his mood led to a downturn in his performance. In his last five starts, Lehner went only 1–3–1 with an .888 save percentage, and his teammates noticed that he became more withdrawn off the ice, a departure for the usually extroverted goaltender. In his 33 games with the Blackhawks, Lehner went 16–10–5 with a .918 save percentage and a 3.01 GAA.

==== Vegas Golden Knights (2020–2024) ====
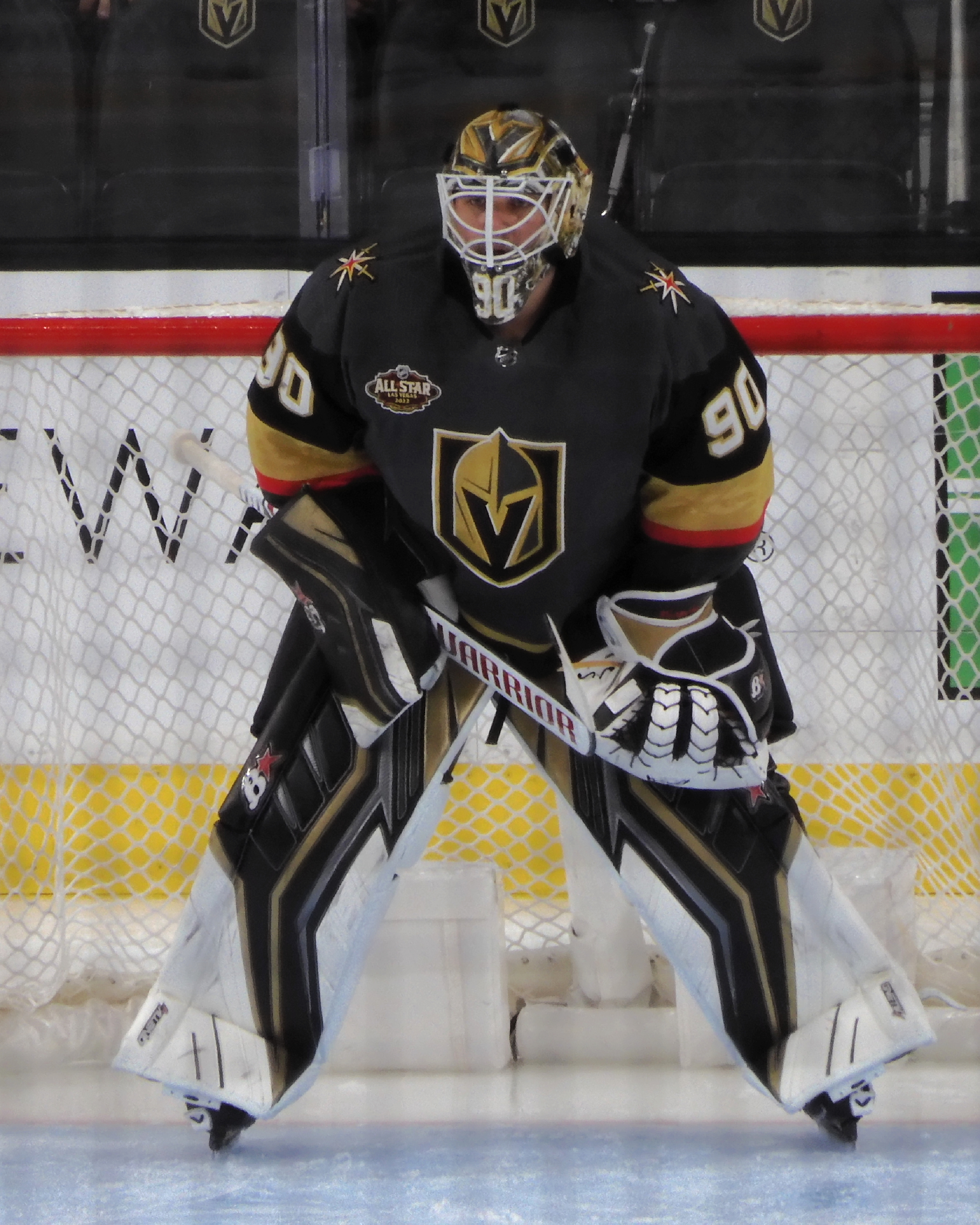
Lehner with the Golden Knights in 2022

On 24 February 2020, Lehner was traded to the Toronto Maple Leafs for prospect Mārtiņš Dzierkals; he was then immediately flipped to the Vegas Golden Knights in exchange for a fifth-round selection in the 2020 NHL entry draft, with Toronto retaining a portion of his salary. Backing up Marc-André Fleury, Lehner only had the opportunity to start three games for Vegas, during which he went 3–0–0 with a 1.67 GAA and .940 save percentage, before the COVID-19 pandemic forced the NHL to prematurely suspend the 2019–20 season on 12 March 2020. When the NHL resumed play that July for the 2020 Stanley Cup playoffs, Lehner was one of 31 Golden Knights invited to join the team in Edmonton. Lehner effectively usurped Fleury's role as starting goaltender during the postseason, getting the nod in six of Vegas's eight qualifying and first-round playoff games. This decision led to some controversy when Fleury's agent posted a picture on Twitter of Fleury with a sword labelled "DeBoer" in his back, suggesting that coach Peter DeBoer had stabbed his client in the back. Lehner's three shutouts against the Vancouver Canucks during the Golden Knights' second-round playoff series, including a series-clinching 3–0 victory, impressed DeBoer enough to give him the nod for the Western Conference finals as well. There, Vegas fell to the Dallas Stars in five games, with Lehner making 23 saves but taking the overtime loss in the final matchup. He went 9–7 in 16 postseason games for Vegas, posting a .917 save percentage and 1.99 GAA in the process.

Lehner signed a five-year, $25 million contract extension with the Vegas Golden Knights on 3 October 2020. The following week, he underwent a simple "clean-up surgery" on his shoulder, with general manager Kelly McCrimmon confident that Lehner would arrive at training camp fully healthy. Lehner and Fleury were platooned for the start of the 2020–21 season, with neither party starting in consecutive games until Lehner suffered an upper body injury while playing against the Los Angeles Kings on 7 February 2021. Lehner's extended absence prompted rumours that he was suffering from a relapse of the mental health or substance abuse issues that had previously hindered him, but when he returned to the lineup on 18 March, he clarified that he had only suffered a concussion and did not want to push himself to return before he was physically ready. Lehner had struggled in his first five starts before the concussion, going 2–1–1 with a 2.96 GAA and .890 save percentage, but he returned to form afterwards: between 19 March and 13 April, Lehner was 7–0–1 with a 1.86 GAA. At the end of the regular season, Fleury and Lehner took the William M. Jennings Trophy, allowing a combined 124 goals in 56 regular-season games. Lehner personally went 13–4–2 with a 2.29 GAA, .913 save percentage, and one shutout during the season. Fleury received the start in all seven games of the Golden Knights' first-round series against the Minnesota Wild in the 2021 Stanley Cup playoffs, and Lehner was asked to start Game 1 of the second-round series in order to let Fleury rest. He allowed seven goals in a loss to the Colorado Avalanche and did not start again until Game 4 of the Stanley Cup Semifinals, where he made 27 saves in the 2–1 overtime victory over the Montreal Canadiens. Montreal defeated Vegas in six games, with Lehner allowing the series-winning overtime goal off the stick of Artturi Lehkonen.

When Fleury was unexpectedly traded to the Blackhawks on 28 July 2021, Lehner became the Golden Knights' de facto starting goaltender for the 2021–22 season, a departure from the platoon role that he had taken ever since his time with the Islanders. With Laurent Brossoit as his new backup, Lehner was asked to keep the Knights competitive through a season that began with defensive difficulties and injuries. Lehner's 2021–22 season was marked by several injuries of his own. He first sustained a lower-body injury on 19 December in the Golden Knights' game against the Islanders, returning on 6 January to make 18 saves in Vegas's 5–1 win over the New York Rangers. He was sidelined again, this time with an upper-body injury, on 14 February. After missing five games, he earned another win by making 16 saves in a 3–1 victory over the San Jose Sharks. One week later, after making 19 saves in a 2–1 loss to the Philadelphia Flyers, Lehner was sent back to Vegas in the middle of the Golden Knights' road trip to undergo injury evaluation. He returned on 3 April, stopping 26 shots to win 3–2 against the Vancouver Canucks. Broissoit was also injured during the season, and in the absence of both veterans, rookie Logan Thompson received significant playing time for Vegas. After unconfirmed reports surfaced suggesting that Lehner required knee surgery, the Golden Knights released a statement on 25 April that he would instead miss the remainder of the season with shoulder surgery for the injury he sustained in February. He finished the season with a 23–17–2 record, 2.83 GAA, and .907 SV% in 44 games, including one shutout.

On 11 August 2022, the Golden Knights announced that Lehner required hip surgery that would cause him to miss the entire 2022–23 NHL season. Entering the 2023–24 season, the Golden Knights announced that Lehner was out indefinitely, and would remain on long-term injured reserve to begin the season. Going into the 2024–25 season, the final year on his contract, Lehner failed to report to a medical exam that was required to remain on long-term injury reserve, giving Vegas the option to nullify his deal and cut him without paying any of the remaining salary from it. A subsequent agreement between the NHL and NHLPA determined that, while the Golden Knights would pay Lehner his $4.4 million salary for the season, it would not count against the team's salary cap. Vegas did not officially comment on the matter, thus ending any ties between Lehner and the franchise.

== International play ==
Lehner first played for the Sweden men's national under-18 ice hockey team at the 2008 Ivan Hlinka Memorial Tournament, where, despite falling out of gold-medal contention with a 4–3 loss to Canada in the round-robin portion, Lehner drew praise from his teammates for making 47 saves. The following year, he was Sweden's starting goaltender at the 2009 IIHF World U18 Championships in Minnesota, helping the team to a fifth-place title while recording a 2.80 GAA and .916 save percentage. Lehner recorded one shutout in the tournament, blocking all 20 shots he faced in a 7–0 opening round victory over the Czech Republic. In 2011, he appeared for the Swedish junior team at the World Junior Championships in Western New York. Lehner took the elimination loss in Sweden's semi-final game against Russia, which was decided 4–3 in a shootout, but he criticized the referees after the game, arguing that he had only allowed one of Russia's goals because he had expected an icing call on the play.

During his NHL career, Lehner has had to withdraw from multiple international tournaments due to health issues. Although he was originally Sweden's starting goaltender at the 2016 World Cup of Hockey, Lehner had to be replaced by Jhonas Enroth after suffering an ankle injury during the previous NHL season. Several years later, Lehner was invited to join the Swedish team at the 2022 Winter Olympics, but after consulting with his psychiatrist, he declined the offer out of fear that the isolative effects of the Olympics' COVID-19 protocols would be detrimental to his mental health. The NHL later announced that no players would be allowed to participate in the 2022 Olympics based on COVID-19 concerns.

== Goaltending style ==
Compared to other NHL goalies, sportswriters have commented on Lehner's lack of movement in front of the net during games. Lehner has attributed this decision both to his large size, which allows him to cover more of the net even without moving, and to the injuries that he received as a younger goaltender employing a more traditional butterfly style. In order to limit unnecessary movement in front of the ice, Lehner uses a technique that he calls "calculated cheating": before games, he will watch videos of opposing skaters in search of any visual cues that they frequently employ before shooting. On the ice, he will look for these cues and will move into position only when he believes that one of these players is about to shoot. Another change that Lehner has made to his goaltending style is in moving closer to the back of the net rather than playing far in front of the crease. He began this move upon joining the Islanders, and believes that staying closer to the net allows him to utilize his body more effectively when blocking shots.

Lehner is critical of what he considers to be the "mechanical" nature of modern goaltending, wherein goaltenders will employ the same positions for each type of save. Instead, he prefers to improvise where possible, either by falling on his side to block the puck with his leg pads or by swatting the puck away with his glove hand. Listed at 240 pounds (110 kg) on the NHL website, Lehner has made an effort to lose weight over his hockey career, both to increase his speed on the ice and to limit injuries.

== Personal life ==
Lehner has been diagnosed with bipolar I disorder, attention deficit hyperactivity disorder (ADHD), and post-traumatic stress disorder (PTSD), the difficulties of which led him to alcohol abuse and an addiction to sleeping pills. Lehner's undiagnosed mental illness and subsequent self-medication caused him to suffer suicidal ideation on multiple occasions, and in 2018, he entered a drug rehabilitation facility to address these longstanding issues. Lehner has been sober from drugs and alcohol since 2018 and marks the anniversary of his sobriety annually on social media. Since coming forward with his own experience, Lehner has been an advocate for open discussions about mental health, trauma, and addiction in the world of ice hockey. He has been openly critical of the NHL's treatment of its players, accusing "many teams" of giving players sedatives and anxiolytics without their or a doctor's consent, and has voiced his support for Kyle Beach in the aftermath of the Blackhawks' sexual abuse scandal.

Lehner and his wife Donya have two children together: a son named Lennox, born 30 October 2014, and a daughter named Zoe, born 27 October 2017. While Lehner was supportive of Donald Trump during the 2016 United States presidential election, he voiced some concerns over Trump's proposed immigration policy, as his wife is Persian and frequently visits her family in Iran. By 2020, Lehner expressed regret for his previous support of Trump, and he joined his teammates in kneeling during the US national anthem to protest the murder of George Floyd.

Lehner is an avid fan of the Swedish melodic death metal band In Flames, which was formed in his hometown of Gothenburg, and he frequently pays tribute to the band on his goaltending masks. He is also a noted fan of the Philadelphia hip-hop artist Vinnie Paz of the group Jedi Mind Tricks. Lehner's other goaltending mask features a giant panda design created by cartoonist Juan Muniz. Lehner started going by the nickname "Panda" when he played for the Blackhawks, who noted his resemblance to the titular character in the Kung Fu Panda film franchise.

== Career statistics ==
Information on career statistics derives from Elite Prospects.

=== Regular season and playoffs ===
			Regular season									Playoffs
Season	Team	League	GP	W	L	OT	MIN	GA	SO	GAA	SV%	GP	W	L	MIN	GA	SO	GAA	SV%
2007–08	Frölunda HC	J18	19	—	—	—	1147	34	6	1.78	—	4	—	—	243	15	0	3.70	—
2008–09	Frölunda HC	J20	22	—	—	—	1318	67	1	3.05	.903	1	—	—	58	3	0	3.08	—
2008–09	Frölunda HC	J18	2	—	—	—	117	5	0	2.56	—	7	—	—	438	19	0	2.60	—
2009–10	Sault Ste. Marie Greyhounds	OHL	47	27	13	3	2574	120	5	2.80	.918	5	1	4	279	20	0	4.29	.874
2009–10	Binghamton Senators	AHL	2	2	0	0	120	6	0	3.00	.898	—	—	—	—	—	—	—	—
2010–11	Binghamton Senators	AHL	22	10	8	2	1246	56	3	2.70	.912	19	14	4	1112	39	3	2.10	.939
2010–11	Ottawa Senators	NHL	8	1	4	0	341	20	0	3.52	.888	—	—	—	—	—	—	—	—
2011–12	Binghamton Senators	AHL	40	13	22	1	1156	119	2	3.26	.907	—	—	—	—	—	—	—	—
2011–12	Ottawa Senators	NHL	5	3	2	0	299	10	1	2.01	.935	—	—	—	—	—	—	—	—
2012–13	Binghamton Senators	AHL	31	18	10	2	1841	65	3	2.12	.938	—	—	—	—	—	—	—	—
2012–13	Ottawa Senators	NHL	12	5	3	4	735	27	0	2.20	.936	2	0	1	49	2	0	2.45	.920
2013–14	Ottawa Senators	NHL	36	12	15	6	1942	99	1	3.06	.913	—	—	—	—	—	—	—	—
2014–15	Ottawa Senators	NHL	25	9	12	3	779	74	0	3.02	.905	—	—	—	—	—	—	—	—
2015–16	Buffalo Sabres	NHL	21	5	9	3	1155	48	1	2.47	.924	—	—	—	—	—	—	—	—
2015–16	Rochester Americans	AHL	3	1	2	0	179	10	0	3.36	.888	—	—	—	—	—	—	—	—
2016–17	Buffalo Sabres	NHL	59	23	26	8	3406	152	2	2.68	.920	—	—	—	—	—	—	—	—
2017–18	Buffalo Sabres	NHL	53	14	26	9	2853	143	3	3.01	.908	—	—	—	—	—	—	—	—
2018–19	New York Islanders	NHL	46	25	13	5	2616	93	6	2.13	.930	8	4	4	449	15	0	2.00	.936
2019–20	Chicago Blackhawks	NHL	33	16	10	5	1876	94	0	3.01	.918	—	—	—	—	—	—	—	—
2019–20	Vegas Golden Knights	NHL	3	3	0	0	180	5	1	1.67	.940	16	9	7	966	32	4	1.99	.917
2020–21	Vegas Golden Knights	NHL	19	13	4	2	1156	44	1	2.29	.913	3	1	2	183	11	0	3.62	.887
2021–22	Vegas Golden Knights	NHL	44	23	17	2	2547	120	1	2.83	.907	—	—	—	—	—	—	—	—
NHL totals			364	152	141	49	20,584	929	17	2.71	.917	29	14	14	1,647	60	4	2.19	.919

=== International ===
Year	Team	Event	Result	GP	W	L	T/OTL	MIN	GA	SO	GAA	SV%
2009	Sweden	U18	5th	4	—	—	—	236	11	1	2.80	.916
2011	Sweden	WJC	4th	3	1	1	0	195	9	1	2.77	.906
Junior totals				7	—	—	—	431	20	2	—	—

== Awards and honours ==
Award	Year	Ref
AHL
Calder Cup champion	2011	
Jack A. Butterfield Trophy	2011	
All-Star	2013	
NHL
William M. Jennings Trophy	2019, (Note: Split with Thomas Greiss as a team award for the New York Islanders.) 2021 (Note: Split with Marc-André Fleury as a team award for the Vegas Golden Knights.)	
Bill Masterton Memorial Trophy	2019	
Sweden
Guldpucken	2019	

Awards and achievements
Preceded by Brian Boyle	Bill Masterton Memorial Trophy winner 2019	Succeeded by Bobby Ryan
Preceded by Tuukka Rask and Jaroslav Halák	William M. Jennings Trophy winner 2021; With: Marc-André Fleury	Succeeded by Frederik Andersen and Antti Raanta
