= Error (law) =

Errors of various types may occur in legal proceedings and may or may not constitute grounds for appeal.

== Types of error ==
- Harmless error is one considered not to have affected the trial's outcome and is thus not grounds for appeal. Harmless error is distinguished from "plain error" in that if error is "preserved" by the making of a timely objection, the burden of proof is on the respondent to show that the error was harmless, but if error was not preserved, the burden of proof is on the appellant to show that the error was plain.
- Invited error is error brought about by a party's own conduct during a trial, and does not give grounds for appeal.
- Reversible error is one that can lead to a judgment being overturned on appeal.

== See also ==
- Actual innocence
- Fundamental error
- Miscarriage of justice
- Mistake of law
