= Kyle Calder =

Canadian ice hockey player (1979–2026)

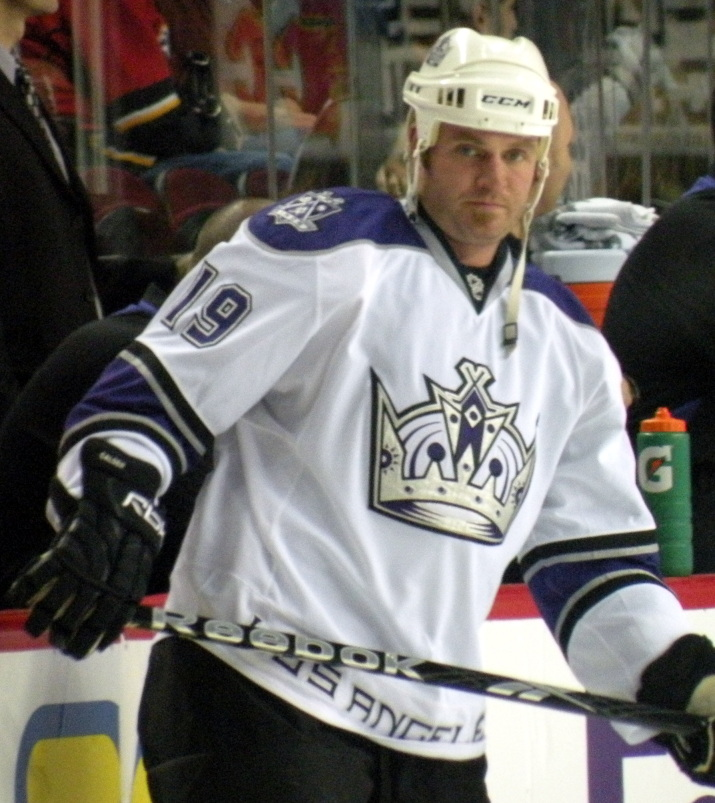
- Calder with the Los Angeles Kings in 2009
- Born: January 5, 1979 Mannville, Alberta, Canada
- Died: June 15, 2026 (aged 47) Lake Forest, Illinois, U.S.
- Height: 5 ft 11 in (180 cm)
- Weight: 180 lb (82 kg; 12 st 12 lb)
- Position: Left wing
- Shot: Left
- Played for: Chicago Blackhawks; Philadelphia Flyers; Detroit Red Wings; Los Angeles Kings; Anaheim Ducks; Barys Astana
- National team: Canada
- NHL draft: 130th overall, 1997; Chicago Blackhawks
- Playing career: 1999–2012

Kyle Charles Calder (January 5, 1979 – June 15, 2026) was a Canadian professional ice hockey forward who played in the National Hockey League (NHL) for the Chicago Blackhawks, Philadelphia Flyers, Detroit Red Wings, Los Angeles Kings, and Anaheim Ducks.

== Playing career ==
Calder began his career by playing junior hockey for the Regina Pats of the Western Hockey League (WHL). After scoring 59 points in his sophomore season, he was drafted in the fifth round of the 1997 draft by the Chicago Blackhawks. After his fourth season where he scored 88 points between two teams, he was rewarded with his first professional contract.

He began his career by playing for the Cleveland Lumberjacks, the Blackhawks' International Hockey League (IHL) affiliate. He also came up to play in the NHL for the first time that season, playing in eight games. During that time, he also got his first NHL goal.

The following year, after the collapse of the IHL, Calder began and ended his season with the Norfolk Admirals, the Blackhawks's new American Hockey League (AHL) affiliate. For a good portion of the season he played for the Blackhawks themselves, appearing in over forty games.

Starting in the 2001–02 NHL season, Calder stayed in the NHL. During the lockout, he spent a brief time in the Swedish Hockey League. He came back to the NHL stronger than ever that season. He led the Blackhawks in goals, assists, and points.

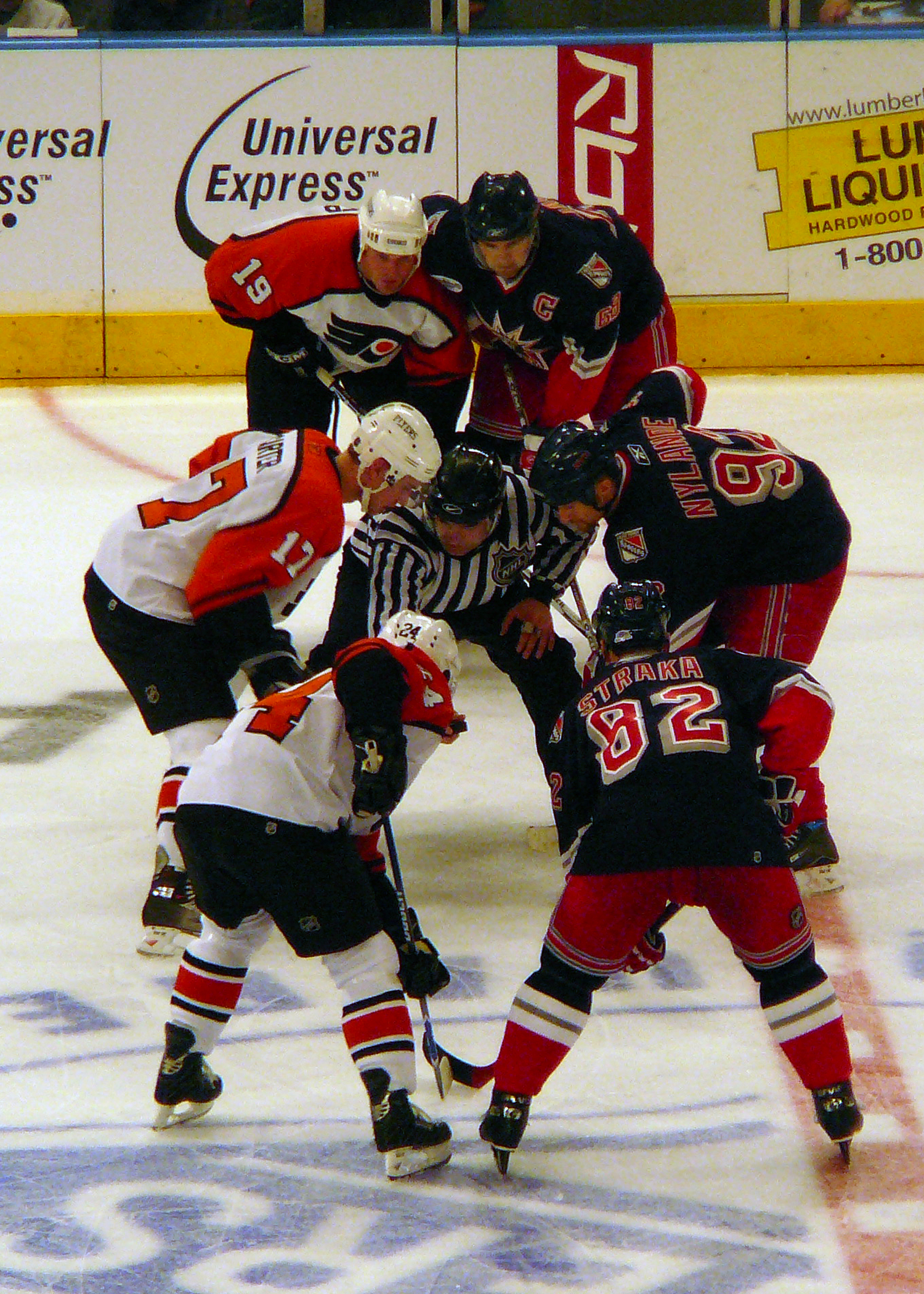
Calder (19) gets ready for a faceoff against the New York Rangers on January 4, 2007.

On August 2, 2006, Calder was awarded a $2.9 million contract for the 2006–07 season by an arbitrator. The Blackhawks decided to accept it, and then on August 4, 2006, Calder was traded to the Philadelphia Flyers in exchange for Michal Handzus. At the trade deadline, the Flyers sent him back to Chicago for a third-round draft pick and Lasse Kukkonen. Chicago immediately sent him to the Detroit Red Wings for Jason Williams. Calder scored his first goal as a Red Wing during his first shift. He signed a two-year contract with the Los Angeles Kings on July 2, 2007.

On September 4, 2009, Calder was invited to the Anaheim Ducks training camp for the 2009–10 season. The Ducks however released him on September 26, less than a week before the start of the season. However, he would return to the Ducks organization on October 28 when they signed Calder to a one-year, two-way contract and assigned him to their ECHL affiliate the Bakersfield Condors. On November 14, he was recalled by Anaheim because of injuries to Saku Koivu and Ryan Carter. On December 28, 2009, Calder was waived by the Anaheim Ducks. After clearing waivers, he was assigned to the Toronto Marlies on December 30, 2009.

== Death ==
Calder died in Lake Forest, Illinois after a brief illness on June 15, 2026, at the age of 47.

== Career statistics ==
=== Regular season and playoffs ===
			Regular season					Playoffs
Season	Team	League	GP	G	A	Pts	PIM	GP	G	A	Pts	PIM
1995–96	Regina Pats	WHL	27	1	7	8	10	11	0	0	0	0
1996–97	Regina Pats	WHL	62	25	34	59	17	5	3	0	3	6
1997–98	Regina Pats	WHL	62	27	50	77	58	2	0	1	1	0
1998–99	Regina Pats	WHL	34	23	28	51	29	—	—	—	—	—
1998–99	Kamloops Blazers	WHL	27	19	18	37	30	15	6	10	16	6
1999–2000	Cleveland Lumberjacks	IHL	74	14	22	36	43	9	2	2	4	14
1999–2000	Chicago Blackhawks	NHL	8	1	1	2	2	—	—	—	—	—
2000–01	Norfolk Admirals	AHL	37	12	15	27	21	9	2	6	8	2
2000–01	Chicago Blackhawks	NHL	43	5	10	15	14	—	—	—	—	—
2001–02	Chicago Blackhawks	NHL	81	17	36	53	47	5	2	0	2	2
2002–03	Chicago Blackhawks	NHL	82	15	27	42	40	—	—	—	—	—
2003–04	Chicago Blackhawks	NHL	66	21	18	39	29	—	—	—	—	—
2004–05	Södertälje SK	SEL	12	5	1	6	6	10	5	1	6	2
2005–06	Chicago Blackhawks	NHL	79	26	33	59	52	—	—	—	—	—
2006–07	Philadelphia Flyers	NHL	59	9	12	21	36	—	—	—	—	—
2006–07	Detroit Red Wings	NHL	19	5	9	14	22	13	0	1	1	8
2007–08	Los Angeles Kings	NHL	65	7	13	20	18	—	—	—	—	—
2008–09	Los Angeles Kings	NHL	74	8	19	27	41	—	—	—	—	—
2009–10	Bakersfield Condors	ECHL	5	3	3	6	0	10	5	5	10	4
2009–10	Anaheim Ducks	NHL	14	0	2	2	8	—	—	—	—	—
2009–10	Toronto Marlies	AHL	40	14	16	30	18	—	—	—	—	—
2010–11	Bakersfield Condors	ECHL	5	3	4	7	6	—	—	—	—	—
2010–11	Barys Astana	KHL	13	3	4	7	16	3	0	1	1	6
2011–12	Bakersfield Condors	ECHL	27	12	11	23	6	—	—	—	—	—
NHL totals			590	114	180	294	309	18	2	1	3	10

=== International ===
Medal record

Representing Canada

Men's ice hockey

World Championships
Gold medal – first place	2003 Helsinki	

World Junior Championships
Silver medal – second place	1999 Winnipeg	

Year	Team	Event	Result	GP	G	A	Pts	PIM
1999	Canada	WJC	2nd place, silver medalist(s)	7	2	6	8	2
2002	Canada	WC	6th	3	0	0	0	0
2003	Canada	WC	1st place, gold medalist(s)	9	1	1	2	0
2006	Canada	WC	4th	9	3	2	5	10
Junior totals				7	2	6	8	2
Senior totals				21	4	3	7	10

== Awards and honours ==
Award	Year
NHL
YoungStars Game	2001–02
