= Jacob Micflikier =

Canadian ice hockey player (born 1984)

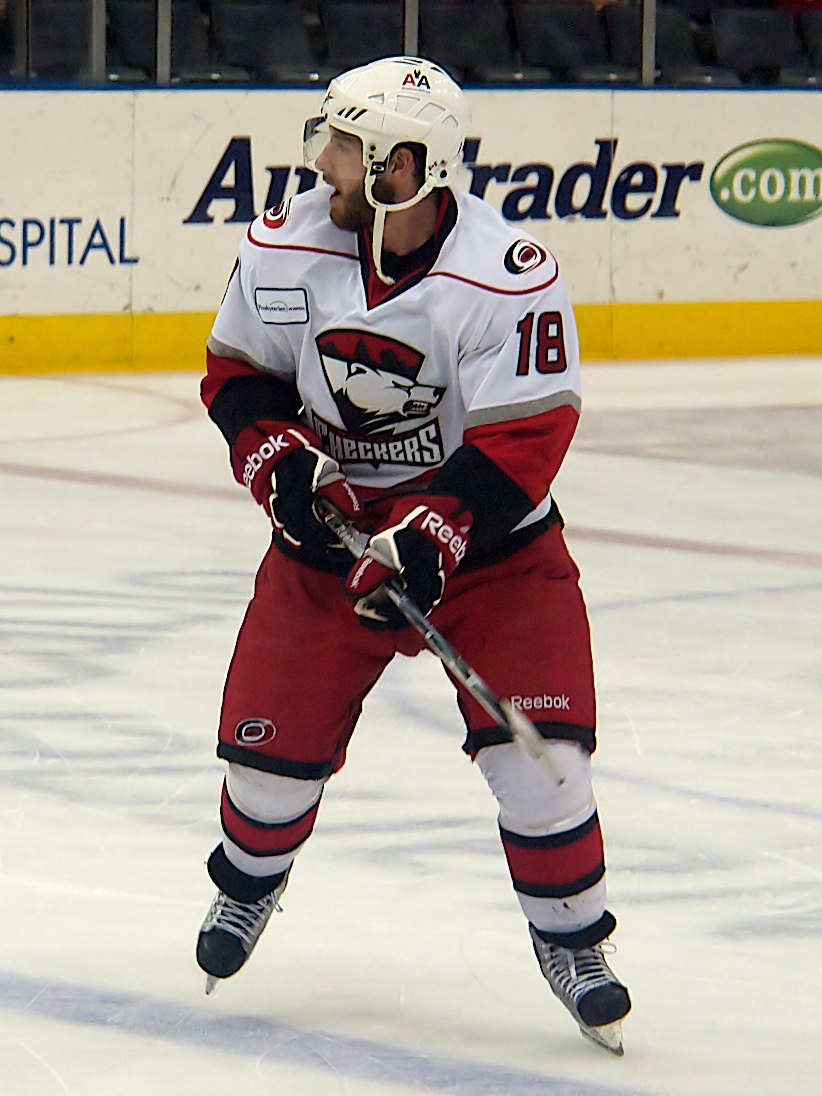
- Born: July 11, 1984 (age 42) Winnipeg, Manitoba, Canada
- Height: 5 ft 8 in (173 cm)
- Weight: 181 lb (82 kg; 12 st 13 lb)
- Position: Forward
- Shot: Left
- Played for: Springfield Falcons; Rochester Americans; Albany River Rats; Charlotte Checkers; Hershey Bears; HC Dinamo Minsk; HC Lugano; Linköping HC; Luleå HF; EHC Biel; HC Fribourg-Gottéron; Växjö Lakers
- NHL draft: Undrafted
- Playing career: 2007–2020

Medal record

Ice hockey

Representing Canada

Spengler Cup
Gold medal – first place	2012 Davos	

Jacob Micflikier (born July 11, 1984) is a Canadian former professional ice hockey forward. He last played for the Växjö Lakers in the Swedish Hockey League (SHL).

== Playing career ==
Micflikier attended Shattuck St. Mary's and played for their hockey team.

=== College ===
After spending two years with the Sioux Falls Stampede of the USHL, Micflikier enrolled at the University of New Hampshire. The 2003–04 season was his first season of college hockey. He was named assistant captain in his senior year of 2006–07.

Micflikier is 24th in all-time scoring for the New Hampshire Wildcats, and three times was selected to receive the university's Ted Karmeris "Fan Favorite Award." As a junior, he was named UNH's Most Valuable Player, and that season led the program in scoring with 42 points (16g, 26a). He also received the Guy Smith Award for best offensive UNH player after his junior season. He recorded four hat tricks in his four seasons as a Wildcat.

=== Professional ===
On March 28, 2007, after completing his senior season at UNH, the Springfield Falcons, then the AHL affiliate of the Edmonton Oilers, signed Micflikier to an Amateur Tryout Agreement contract (ATO). During his nine games played under the ATO, he scored three goals and one assist.

On July 25, 2007, the Falcons signed him to his first professional contract; a one-year deal. Micflikier split the 2007–08 season between the Falcons and the Stockton Thunder of the ECHL.

After his 2007–08 season, Micflikier was signed to a one-year contract with the AHL's Rochester Americans. He split the following season (2008–09) between Rochester and the ECHL's Florida Everblades. In November he was ECHL Player of the Week, and in November 2009 he was both ECHL Player of the Month and ECHL Player of the Week.

On September 10, 2009, Micflikier signed a contract with the Albany River Rats. The River Rats and Americans shared an ECHL affiliate in the Florida Everblades. After signing with the River Rats, Micflikier found his time down in the ECHL with Florida dwindling. He spent 59 games with Albany, and just 16 with the Everblades. Micflikier was selected to play in the ECHL All-Star Game during the 2009–10 season.

On July 29, 2010, Micflikier was re-signed with the new franchise the Charlotte Checkers, which was formed as a result of the relocation of the Albany River Rats. He spent his entire 2010–11 season in the AHL, and played 78 games with the Checkers. He ranked third on the Checkers in scoring with 61 points in the 2010–11 season.

On July 14, 2011, Micflikier signed a one-year contract with the Washington Capitals. He was assigned to AHL affiliate, the Hershey Bears for the duration of the 2011–12 season.

In June 2012, Micflikier signed his first contract abroad on a one-year deal with EHC Biel in the Swiss National League A. He tallied 21 goals and 30 assists in 52 NLA games for Biel on the season.

He started the 2013-14 campaign with KHL's Dynamo Minsk, before transferring to HC Lugano of Switzerland during the season.

On July 25, 2014, Micflikier agreed to a one-year contract with SHL club, Linköpings HC. He stayed in Sweden a second year, putting pen to paper on a contract with Luleå HF for the 2015-16 campaign. Leading the team in scoring, he recorded 21 goals and 20 assists in 62 SHL contests.

He then headed back to EHC Biel of Switzerland for a second stint with the club, signing in April 2016.

== Personal ==
Micflikier was born in Winnipeg, MB, Canada, and is Jewish.

== Career statistics ==
			Regular season					Playoffs
Season	Team	League	GP	G	A	Pts	PIM	GP	G	A	Pts	PIM
2001–02	Sioux Falls Stampede	USHL	61	24	20	44	30	3	0	0	0	6
2002–03	Sioux Falls Stampede	USHL	59	31	36	67	26	—	—	—	—	—
2003–04	University of New Hampshire	Hockey East	39	11	15	26	24	—	—	—	—	—
2004–05	University of New Hampshire	Hockey East	42	20	24	44	44	—	—	—	—	—
2005–06	University of New Hampshire	Hockey East	37	16	26	42	52	—	—	—	—	—
2006–07	University of New Hampshire	Hockey East	36	11	27	38	37	—	—	—	—	—
2006–07	Springfield Falcons	AHL	9	3	1	4	4	—	—	—	—	—
2007–08	Stockton Thunder	ECHL	29	10	27	37	29	6	4	9	13	10
2007–08	Springfield Falcons	AHL	8	1	4	5	0	—	—	—	—	—
2008–09	Florida Everblades	ECHL	10	10	14	24	21	6	2	2	4	8
2008–09	Rochester Americans	AHL	39	4	12	16	12	—	—	—	—	—
2009–10	Florida Everblades	ECHL	16	9	23	32	15	—	—	—	—	—
2009–10	Albany River Rats	AHL	59	18	22	40	30	7	1	1	2	2
2010–11	Charlotte Checkers	AHL	78	29	32	61	80	14	0	3	3	6
2011–12	Hershey Bears	AHL	57	21	35	56	58	5	0	1	1	2
2012–13	EHC Biel	NLA	48	21	29	50	26	4	0	1	1	0
2013–14	HC Dinamo Minsk	KHL	11	3	0	3	8	—	—	—	—	—
2013–14	HC Lugano	NLA	35	16	11	27	45	2	0	1	1	10
2014–15	Linköping HC	SHL	54	24	23	47	26	11	5	2	7	10
2015–16	Luleå HF	SHL	52	19	14	33	34	10	2	6	8	6
AHL totals			250	76	106	182	184	26	1	5	6	10

== Awards and honors ==
Award	Year(s)
Hockey East All-Tournament Team	2006

== See also ==
- List of select Jewish ice hockey players
