= United States v. Olano =

- Supreme Court of the United States

Argued December 9, 1992 Decided April 26, 1993
- Full case name: United States, Petitioner v. Guy W. Olano, Jr. and Raymond M. Gray
- Citations: 507 U.S. 725 (more) 113 S. Ct. 1770; 123 L. Ed. 2d 508; 1993 U.S. LEXIS 2986; 61 U.S.L.W. 4421; 93 Cal. Daily Op. Service 3040; 93 Daily Journal DAR 5188; 7 Fla. L. Weekly Fed. S 205

Court membership
- Chief Justice William Rehnquist Associate Justices Byron White · Harry Blackmun; John P. Stevens · Sandra Day O'Connor; Antonin Scalia · Anthony Kennedy; David Souter · Clarence Thomas

Case opinions
- Majority: O'Connor, joined by Rehnquist, Scalia, Kennedy, Souter, Thomas
- Concurrence: Kennedy
- Dissent: Stevens, joined by White, Blackmun

United States v. Olano, 507 U.S. 725 (1993), was a United States Supreme Court case that distinguished between forfeiture and waiver. Quoting from Johnson v. Zerbst, 304 U.S. 458 (1938), the Court noted, "Whereas forfeiture is the failure to make the timely assertion of a right, waiver is the "intentional relinquishment or abandonment of a known right.... Whether a particular right is waivable; whether the defendant must participate personally in the waiver; whether certain procedures are required for waiver; and whether the defendant's choice must be particularly informed or voluntary, all depend on the right at stake."

According to the Court, mere forfeiture, as opposed to waiver, does not extinguish an "error" under Rule 52(b) of the Federal Rules of Criminal Procedure. If a legal rule was violated during the District Court proceedings, and if the defendant did not waive the rule, then there has been an "error" within the meaning of Rule 52(b) despite the absence of a timely objection.

== See also ==
- List of United States Supreme Court cases
- List of United States Supreme Court cases, volume 507
- List of United States Supreme Court cases by the Rehnquist Court
