= 2006 Hockey East men's ice hockey tournament =

2006 Hockey East Men's ice hockey tournament
- Dates: March 9–18, 2006
- Teams: 8
- Finals site: TD Banknorth Garden; Boston, Massachusetts
- Champions: Boston University (6th title)
- Winning coach: Jack Parker (6th title)
- MVP: David Van der Gulik (Boston University)
- Hockey East Men's Ice Hockey Tournaments

The 2006 Hockey East Men's Ice Hockey Tournament was the 22nd tournament in the history of the conference. It was played between March 9 and March 18, 2006. Quarterfinal games were played at home team campus sites, while the final four games were played at the TD Banknorth Garden in Boston, Massachusetts, the home venue of the NHL's Boston Bruins. By winning the tournament, Boston University received the Hockey East's automatic bid to the 2006 NCAA Division I Men's Ice Hockey Tournament.

== Format ==
The tournament featured three rounds of play. The teams that finish below eighth in the conference are not eligible for tournament play. In the first round, the first and eighth seeds, the second and seventh seeds, the third seed and sixth seeds, and the fourth seed and fifth seeds played a best-of-three with the winner advancing to the semifinals. In the semifinals, the highest and lowest seeds and second highest and second lowest seeds play a single-elimination game, with the winner advancing to the championship game. The tournament champion receives an automatic bid to the 2006 NCAA Division I Men's Ice Hockey Tournament.

== Conference standings ==
Note: GP = Games played; W = Wins; L = Losses; T = Ties; PTS = Points; GF = Goals For; GA = Goals Against

2005–06 Hockey East standings
	Conference							Overall					
	GP	W	L	T	PTS	GF	GA	GP	W	L	T	GF	GA
#5 Boston University†*	27	17	7	3	37	89	67	40	26	10	4	140	96
#4 Maine	27	17	8	2	36	93	60	42	28	12	2	143	95
#2 Boston College	27	17	8	2	36	86	58	42	26	13	3	146	95
#13 New Hampshire	27	14	7	6	34	85	63	40	20	13	7	120	102
Providence	27	14	10	3	31	78	67	36	17	16	3	105	94
Vermont	27	10	11	6	26	65	62	38	18	14	6	97	82
Massachusetts–Lowell	27	11	14	2	24	74	96	36	14	20	2	104	132
Massachusetts	27	10	15	2	22	60	77	36	13	21	2	77	103
Northeastern	27	3	17	7	13	57	88	34	3	24	7	67	120
Merrimack	27	3	19	5	11	43	92	34	6	23	5	64	118
Championship: Boston University † indicates conference regular season champion * indicates conference tournament champion Final rankings: USA Today/USA Hockey Magazine Top 15 Poll

== Bracket ==
Quarterfinals; March 9–11
1	Boston University	4	4	—
8	Massachusetts	1	1	—
2	Maine	4*	4	—
7	Massachusetts-Lowell	3	3	—
(Pairings are reseeded after the first round)
3	Boston College	3*	6	—
6	Vermont	2	2	—
4	New Hampshire	4	2**	—
5	Providence	0	1	—

Semifinals; March 17
1	Boston University	9
4	New Hampshire	2
2	Maine	1
3	Boston College	4

Championship; March 18
1	Boston University	2*
3	Boston College	1

Note: * denotes overtime period(s)

=== Quarterfinals ===
==== (1) Boston University vs. (8) Massachusetts ====
March 10	Boston University	4 – 1	Massachusetts	Agganis Arena	Recap
David Van der Gulik - 06:15		First period	No scoring
David Van der Gulik - GW - 04:00		Second period	No scoring
John Laliberte - PP - 13:51; David Van der Gulik - EN - 19:16		Third period	05:52 - PP - Chris Capraro
John Curry ( 25 saves / 26 shots )		Goalie stats	Gabe Winer ( 25 saves / 28 shots )

March 11	Boston University	4 – 1	Massachusetts	Agganis Arena	Recap
Bryan Ewing - 01:16		First period	No scoring
No Scoring		Second period	No scoring
John Laliberte - GW PP - 05:50; Kenny Roche - 09:38; Peter MacArthur - EN - 19:34		Third period	18:42 - EA PP - Chris Capraro
John Curry ( 32 saves / 33 shots )		Goalie stats	Jonathan Quick ( 32 saves / 35 shots )

Boston University won series 2–0

==== (2) Maine vs. (7) Massachusetts-Lowell ====
March 10	Maine	4 – 3	OT	Massachusetts-Lowell	Alfond Arena	Recap
Greg Moore - PP - 13:20; Derek Damon - 17:23		First period		08:47 - SH - Jason Tejchma
No Scoring		Second period		19:12 - Jeremy Hall
Greg Moore - PP - 09:51		Third period		2:24 - Nick Monroe
Keith Johnson - GW - 00:51		First overtime period		No scoring
Ben Bishop ( 21 saves / 24 shots )		Goalie stats		Peter Vetri ( 34 saves / 38 shots )

March 11	Maine	4 – 3	Massachusetts-Lowell	Alfond Arena	Recap
Matt Duffy - 11:20		First period	00:28 - Bobby Robins
Greg Moore - 00:27; John Hopson - PP - 05:01; Matt Duffy - GW - 05:54		Second period	12:14 - PP - J.R. Bria; 12:36 - PP - Andrew Martin
No scoring		Third period	No scoring
Ben Bishop ( 24 saves / 27 shots )		Goalie stats	Peter Vetri ( 24 saves / 28 shots )

Maine won series 2–0

==== (3) Boston College vs. (6) Vermont ====
March 9	Boston College	3 – 2	OT	Vermont	Silvio O. Conte Forum	Recap
Brian Boyle - PP - 05:17		First period		07:47 - PP - Dean Strong
No scoring		Second period		No scoring
Chris Collins - EA - 19:01		Third period		03:28 - Jamie Sifers
Peter Harold - GW - 10:41		First overtime period		No scoring
Cory Schneider ( 25 saves / 27 shots )		Goalie stats		Joe Fallon ( 31 saves / 34 shots )

March 10	Boston College	6 – 2	Vermont	Silvio O. Conte Forum	Recap
Chris Collins - 14:49		First period	No scoring
Chris Collins - GW PP - 11:40; Brett Motherwell - GW PP - 18:51		Second period	15:10 - Jeff Corey
Benn Ferriero - SH - 06:18; Dan Bertram - EN - 18:13; Chris Collins - EN - 18:45		Third period	10:54 - EA PP - Peter Lenes
Cory Schneider ( 23 saves / 25 shots )		Goalie stats	Joe Fallon ( 19 saves / 23 shots ) / Travis Russell ( 1 saves / 1 shots )

Boston College won series 2–0

==== (4) New Hampshire vs. (5) Providence ====
March 9	New Hampshire	4 – 0	Providence	Whittemore Center	Recap
Jacob Micflikier - GW - 06:07; Brett Hemingway - PP - 14:11		First period	No scoring
No scoring		Second period	No scoring
Daniel Winnik - 05:13; Josh Ciocco - EN SH - 10:42		Third period	No scoring
Kevin Regan ( 27 saves / 27 shots )		Goalie stats	Tyler Sims ( 26 saves / 29 shots )

March 10	New Hampshire	2 – 1	2OT	Providence	Whittemore Center	Recap
No Scoring		First period		No scoring
Jacob Micflikier - PP - 10:34		Second period		03:20 - PP - Colin McDonald
No Scoring		Third period		No scoring
Daniel Winnik - GW - 14:18		Second overtime period		No scoring
Jeff Pietrasiak ( 34 saves / 35 shots )		Goalie stats		Tyler Sims ( 59 saves / 61 shots )

New Hampshire won series 2–0

=== Semifinals ===
==== (1) Boston University vs. (4) New Hampshire ====
March 17	Boston University	9 – 2	New Hampshire	TD Banknorth Garden	Recap
Dan Spang - 09:06; David Van der Gulik - 10:28		First period	02:53 - PP - Jacob Micflikier
David Van der Gulik - GW - 07:40; Matt Gilroy - 11:28; David Van der Gulik - 13:49		Second period	14:34 - PP - Jacob Micflikier
Bryan Ewing - 00:42; Brad Zancanaro - 02:07; Bryan Ewing - PP - 03:21; Dan Spang - PP - 03:36		Third period	No scoring
Kevin Regan ( 23 saves / 30 shots ) / Jeff Pietrasiak ( 6 saves / 8 shots )		Goalie stats	John Curry ( 25 saves / 27 shots ) / Stephan Siwiec ( 2 saves / 2 shots )

==== (2) Maine vs. (3) Boston College ====
March 17	Maine	1 – 4	Boston College	TD Banknorth Garden	Recap
No Scoring		First period	No scoring
Josh Soares - PP - 18:14		Second period	06:27 - SH - Benn Ferriero; 08:55 - GW - Brian Boyle
No Scoring		Third period	19:13 - EN - Stephen Gionta; 19:56 - EN - Nathan Gerbe
Ben Bishop ( 25 saves / 27 shots )		Goalie stats	Cory Schneider ( 35 saves / 36 shots )

=== Championship ===
==== (1) Boston University vs. (3) Boston College ====
March 18	Boston University	2 – 1	OT	Boston College	TD Banknorth Garden	Recap
No Scoring		First period		03:24 - Mike Brennan
John McCarthy - 14:30		Second period		No scoring
No scoring		Third period		No scoring
Brandon Yip - GW - 14:22		First overtime period		No scoring
John Curry ( 29 saves / 30 shots )		Goalie stats		Cory Schneider ( 37 saves / 39 shots )

== Tournament awards ==
=== All-Tournament Team ===
- F Brian Boyle (Boston College)
- F Jacob Micflikier (New Hampshire)
- F David Van der Gulik* (Boston University)
- D Peter Harold (Boston College)
- D Dan Spang (Boston University)
- G Cory Schneider (Boston College)

* Tournament MVP(s)
