= Dan Spang =

American-Italian ice hockey player (born 1983)

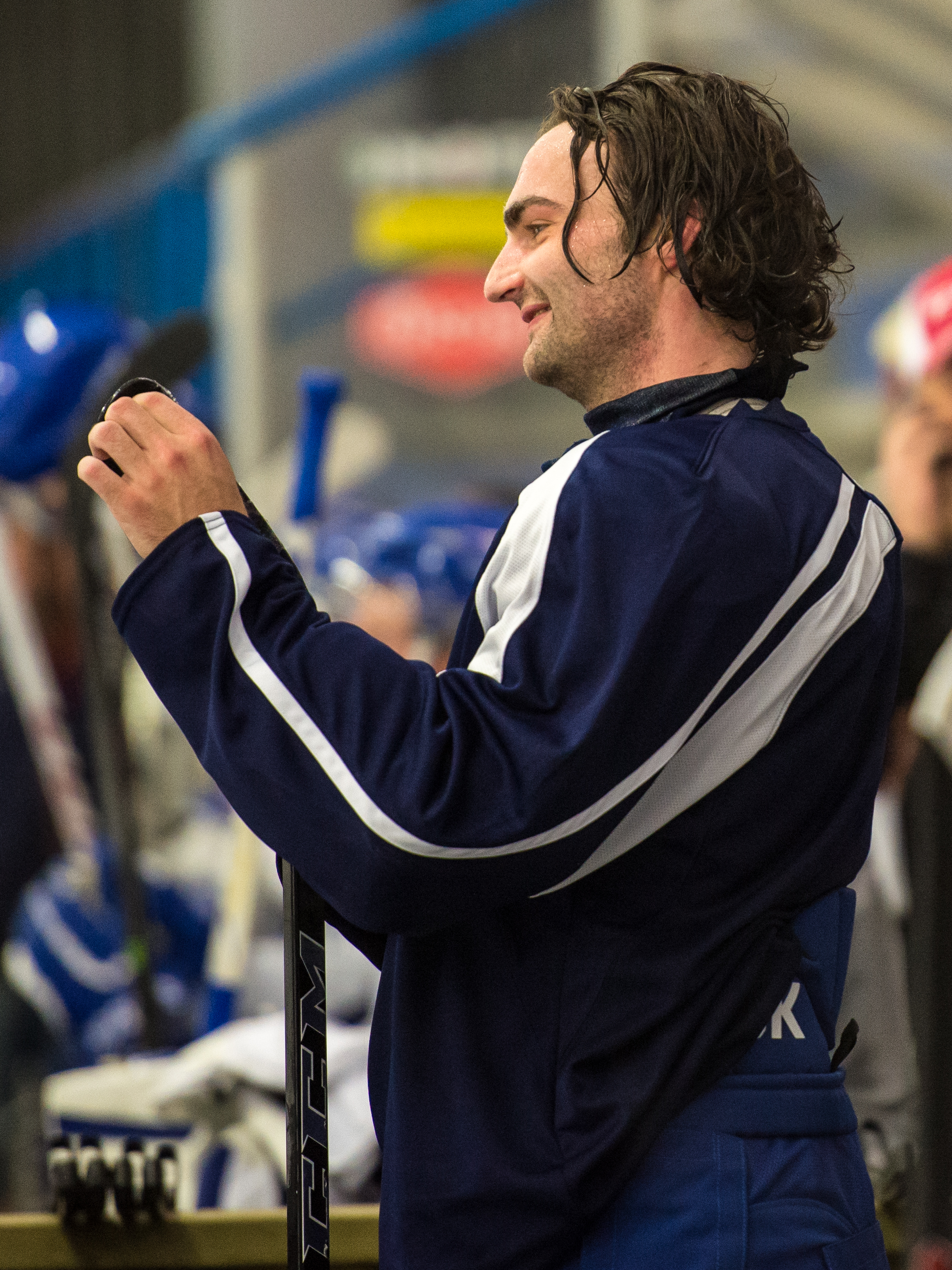
- Born: August 16, 1983 (age 43) Winchester, Massachusetts, U.S.
- Height: 6 ft 0 in (183 cm)
- Weight: 205 lb (93 kg; 14 st 9 lb)
- Position: Defense
- Shot: Left
- Played for: Cleveland Barons; Worcester Sharks; Quad City Flames; Syracuse Crunch; Nürnberg Ice Tigers; Texas Stars; HPK; SaiPa; HV71; Torpedo Nizhny Novgorod; Leksands IF; Oulun Kärpät; HC Kometa Brno; Hamburg Freezers; Nottingham Panthers; Löwen Frankfurt
- NHL draft: 52nd overall, 2002; San Jose Sharks
- Playing career: 2005–2019

Dan Spang (born August 16, 1983) is a former American-Italian professional ice hockey defenseman. He last played for Löwen Frankfurt in the German DEL2. Spang was selected by the San Jose Sharks in the 2nd round (52nd overall) of the 2002 NHL entry draft.

== Playing career ==
Spang won a Massachusetts state championship in 2000 at Winchester High School. He was drafted by the San Jose Sharks in the second round, 52nd overall, of the 2002 NHL entry draft.

During his collegiate career, he was a co-winner of Boston University’s Most Improved Player Award following the 2003–04 season. Spang led Boston University defensemen in goals (nine), assists (22) and points (31) in 40 games as a senior. Won a Hockey East regular season and tournament championship at Boston University in 2005–06 he was an Alternate Captain for the Worcester Sharks as a rookie in 2006–07 and remained with the club for the following 2007-08 season.

The 2008-09 season saw him play for AHL franchises Quad City Flames, Syracuse Crunch as well as for ECHL’s Las Vegas Wranglers.

On July 21, 2009, he signed a contract for Nürnberg Ice Tigers of the Deutsche Eishockey Liga, where he spent the entire 2009-10 season. He then signed with the Dallas Stars organization to play for them in the 2010–11 season. However, he was assigned to the affiliates Texas Stars of the AHL.

Although Spang signed with the Växjö Lakers Hockey of the Swedish Elitserien (SEL) on May 4, 2011, he extended his contract with the Dallas Stars organization on June 16, 2011.

Between 2012 and 2015, Spang played for three different teams of the Finnish elite league Liiga, HPK, SaiPa and Kärpät. In between, during the 2012–13 season, he had a stint with Swedish SHL side HV71.

Spang opened the 2015–16 season in the KHL on the roster of Torpedo Nizhny Novgorod. After eleven games played, he moved on to Czech club HC Kometa Brno. In December, he was signed by HC Lugano of Switzerland on loan to strengthen the club's roster at the Spengler-Cup. In late January 2016, he signed with the Hamburg Freezers of the German top-tier league, DEL, for the remainder of the 2015–16 campaign.

After two seasons with the Nottingham Panthers, Spang returned to Germany in 2018 with DEL2 side Löwen Frankfurt before retiring.

== Career statistics ==
			Regular season					Playoffs
Season	Team	League	GP	G	A	Pts	PIM	GP	G	A	Pts	PIM
2000–01	Winchester High School	HSMA	24	8	37	45	14	—	—	—	—	—
2001–02	Winchester High School	HSMA	6	9	8	17	14	—	—	—	—	—
2002–03	Boston University	HE	27	3	6	9	14	—	—	—	—	—
2003–04	Boston University	HE	38	5	9	14	12	—	—	—	—	—
2004–05	Boston University	HE	41	3	13	16	22	—	—	—	—	—
2005–06	Boston University	HE	40	9	22	31	14	—	—	—	—	—
2005–06	Cleveland Barons	AHL	8	0	0	0	8	—	—	—	—	—
2006–07	Worcester Sharks	AHL	48	4	21	25	18	—	—	—	—	—
2007–08	Worcester Sharks	AHL	77	8	23	31	41	—	—	—	—	—
2008–09	Quad City Flames	AHL	30	1	7	8	10	—	—	—	—	—
2008–09	Las Vegas Wranglers	ECHL	17	2	10	12	10	16	5	10	15	2
2008–09	Syracuse Crunch	AHL	24	3	10	13	6	—	—	—	—	—
2009–10	Thomas Sabo Ice Tigers	DEL	48	4	10	14	45	5	1	2	3	0
2010–11	Texas Stars	AHL	77	10	27	37	32	6	0	4	4	2
2011–12	Texas Stars	AHL	70	4	22	26	28	—	—	—	—	—
2012–13	HPK	SM-liiga	42	3	13	16	26	—	—	—	—	—
2012–13	HV71	SEL	11	1	2	3	0	5	0	1	1	0
2013–14	SaiPa	Liiga	31	3	7	10	8	13	1	10	11	8
2014–15	Kärpät	Liiga	55	2	10	12	26	14	0	1	1	0
2015–16	Torpedo Nizhny Novgorod	KHL	11	0	3	3	2	—	—	—	—	—
2015–16	HC Kometa Brno	ELH	8	0	2	2	0	—	—	—	—	—
2015–16	Hamburg Freezers	DEL	12	1	2	3	2	—	—	—	—	—
2016–17	Nottingham Panthers	EIHL	51	9	19	28	24	2	0	0	0	2
2017–18	Nottingham Panthers	EIHL	48	6	15	21	8	4	1	1	2	2
2018–19	Löwen Frankfurt	DEL2	49	9	23	32	50	15	1	7	8	16
AHL totals			334	30	110	140	143	6	0	4	4	2
SM-liiga/Liiga totals			128	8	30	38	60	27	1	11	12	8

== Awards and honors ==
Award	Year
All-Hockey East First Team	2005–06
AHCA East First-Team All-American	2005–06
Hockey East All-Tournament Team	2006
