= Brian Boyle =

American ice hockey player (born 1984)

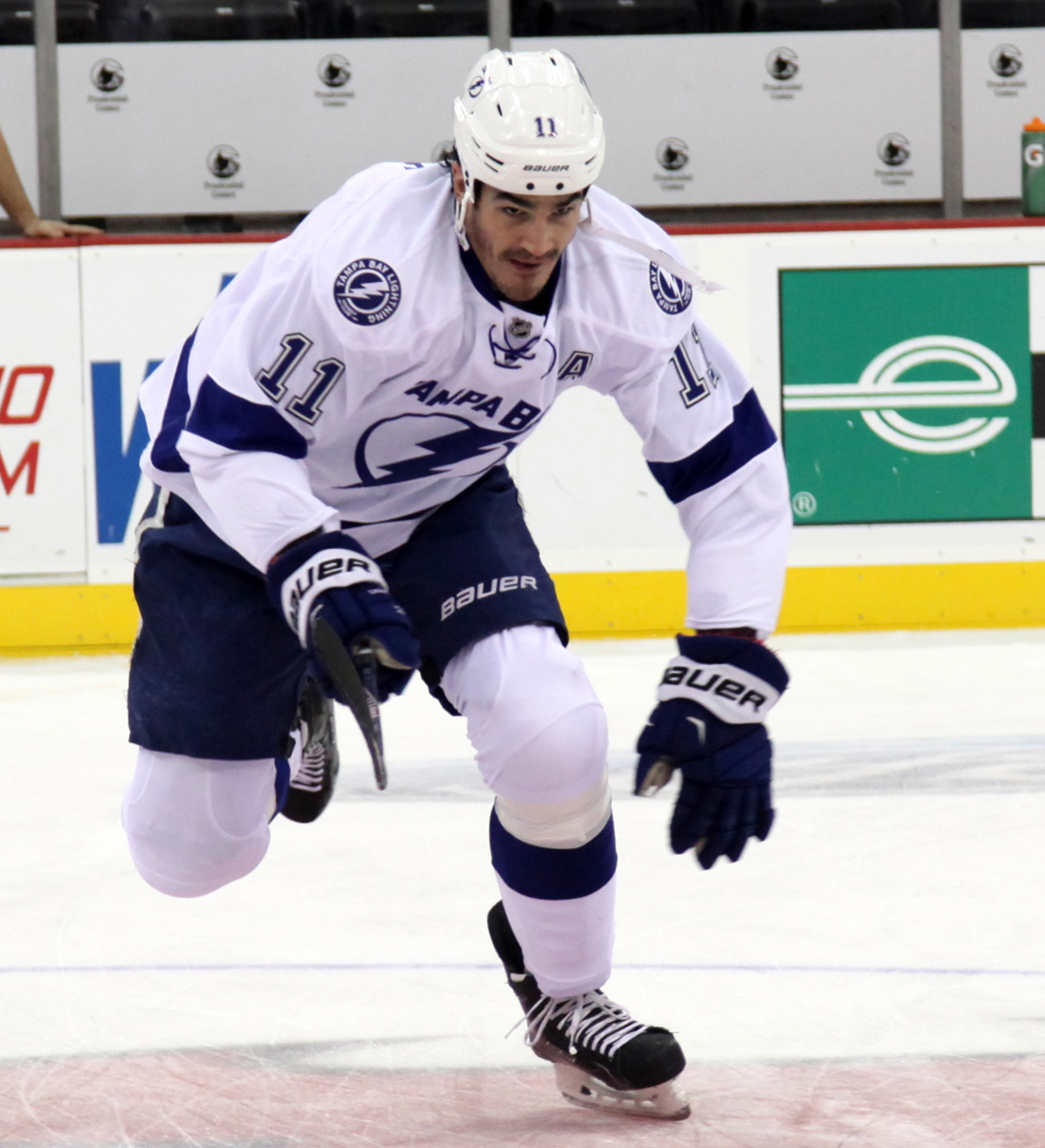
- Boyle with the Tampa Bay Lightning in December 2014
- Born: December 18, 1984 (age 41) Hingham, Massachusetts, U.S.
- Height: 6 ft 7 in (201 cm)
- Weight: 244 lb (111 kg; 17 st 6 lb)
- Position: Center
- Shot: Left
- Played for: Los Angeles Kings; New York Rangers; Tampa Bay Lightning; Toronto Maple Leafs; New Jersey Devils; Nashville Predators; Florida Panthers; Pittsburgh Penguins
- National team: United States
- NHL draft: 26th overall, 2003; Los Angeles Kings
- Playing career: 2007–2022

Brian Paul Boyle (born December 18, 1984) is an American former professional ice hockey center who works as an analyst for NHL Network. Boyle has previously played for the Los Angeles Kings, New York Rangers, Tampa Bay Lightning, Toronto Maple Leafs, New Jersey Devils, Nashville Predators, Florida Panthers and Pittsburgh Penguins of the National Hockey League (NHL). He attended St. Sebastian's School in Needham, Massachusetts, before moving on to Boston College. Boyle grew up in Hingham, just south of Boston.

== Playing career ==
=== Los Angeles Kings ===
Boyle was drafted in the first round, 26th overall, by the Los Angeles Kings in the 2003 NHL entry draft. He played four seasons at Boston College before making his professional debut with the Kings' American Hockey League (AHL) affiliate, the Manchester Monarchs, in 2007.

In the 2007–08 season, Boyle made his NHL debut with the Kings against the New Jersey Devils on February 2, 2008. He scored his first career NHL goal that same night against Martin Brodeur in a 6–3 defeat. He scored four goals in his first seven NHL games, three in his first four.

=== New York Rangers ===
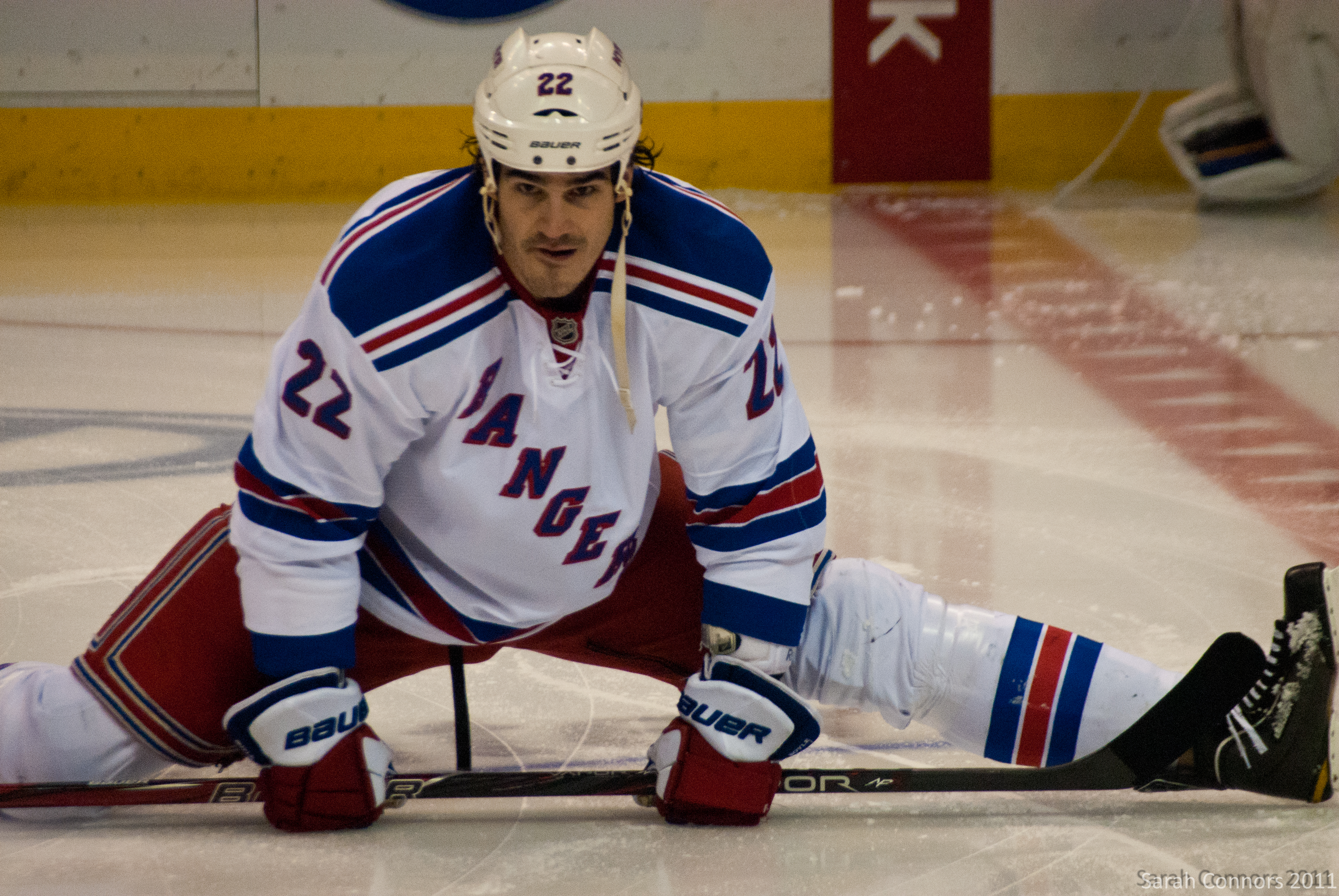
Boyle with the Rangers in December 2011

At the 2009 NHL entry draft, on June 27, Boyle was traded to the New York Rangers in exchange for a third-round pick in 2010 (used to select Jordan Weal).

During the 2012 Stanley Cup playoffs, Boyle suffered a concussion after being hit by Ottawa Senators' forward Chris Neil. Boyle subsequently missed three games. Earlier in the same series, Ottawa defenseman Matt Carkner received a one-game suspension for repeatedly punching Boyle in the face. The attack came in response to an unprovoked incident in Game 1 of the series in which Boyle punched Senators defenseman Erik Karlsson in the face.

=== Tampa Bay Lightning ===
On July 1, 2014, Boyle left the Rangers after five seasons and signed a three-year, $6 million contract as a free agent with the Tampa Bay Lightning. He changed his sweater number from number 22, which he wore with both the Kings and Rangers, to number 11 out of respect to his best friend and former college hockey player who died that summer. On December 12, 2015, Boyle skated in his 500th career NHL game in a 1–2 Lightning loss to the visiting Washington Capitals. On May 24, 2016, Boyle recorded his first career two goal game in the playoffs. On May 26, Boyle played in his 100th career Stanley Cup playoff game.

=== Toronto Maple Leafs ===
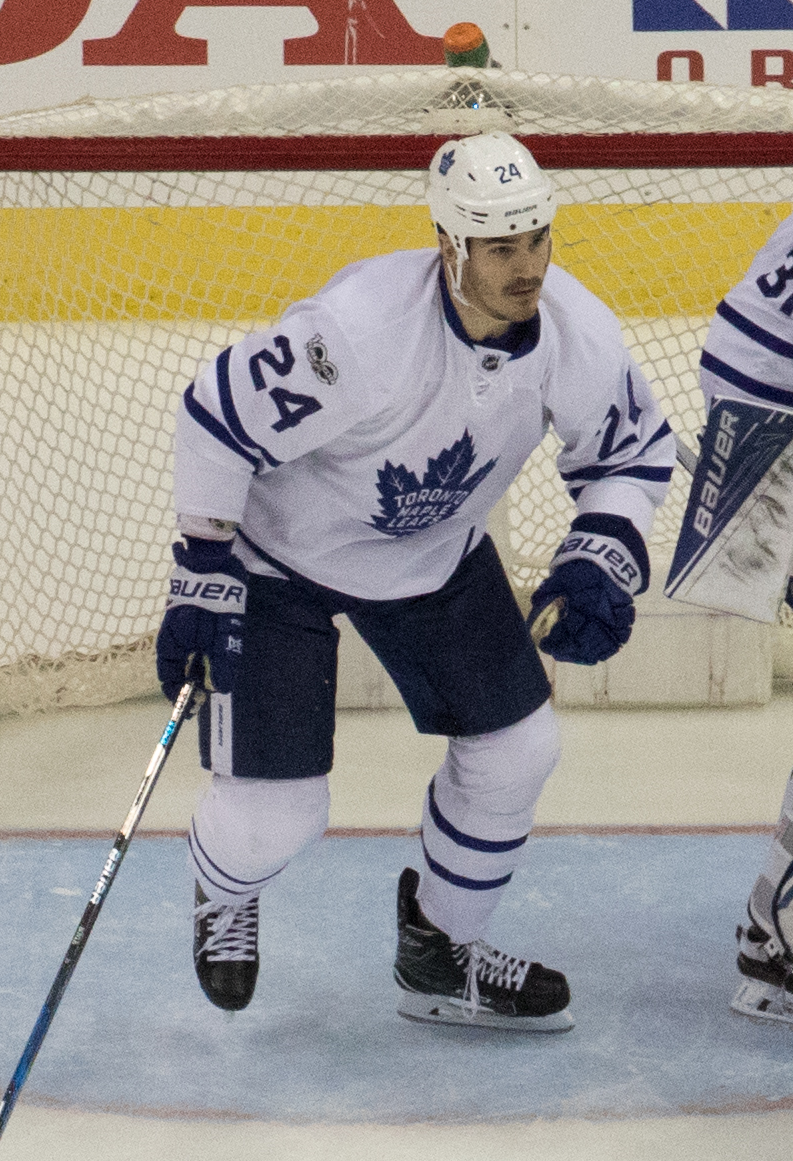
Boyle with the Maple Leafs during the 2017 Stanley Cup playoffs

Burdened by imminent salary cap space issues and sitting outside of a playoff spot, the Lightning traded Boyle two days before the NHL trade deadline on February 27, 2017, to the Toronto Maple Leafs in exchange for forward Byron Froese and a conditional 2017 second-round draft pick. Boyle, who was on pace for his best season offensively with Tampa Bay, was in the final season of his three-year contract.

Boyle's size, penalty killing abilities and faceoff skills were all major factors in leading the Maple Leafs to target the center. Boyle's playoff experience was also highly coveted (he had played the most playoff games of any player since 2011) by the team made up by a plethora of inexperienced rookies on the cusp of making the post-season. He switched to number 24 in Toronto as number 11 (which he wore in Tampa Bay) was taken by Zach Hyman. Boyle was slotted on the fourth line primarily centreing Matt Martin and Nikita Soshnikov (with Kasperi Kapanen filling in following a late season injury by Soshnikov). Boyle's offensive production declined as a result of the decreased ice time, but his faceoff abilities allowed the team to qualify for the playoffs for the first time in four years. He tallied two assists in the series against the top seeded Washington Capitals as the Maple Leafs fell in six games.

=== New Jersey Devils ===
As an unrestricted free agent, on July 1, 2017, Boyle signed a two-year, $5.1 million contract with New Jersey Devils. On November 1, 2017, Boyle played in his first game since his diagnosis of chronic myelogenous leukemia, also his first game with the Devils, against the Vancouver Canucks just over a week after returning to practice. On November 9, he scored his first goal as a member of the Devils, as well as his first goal since his cancer diagnosis, against Cam Talbot of the Edmonton Oilers. "I've never cried after a goal before," Boyle told MSG during a first-intermission interview. "That's a great feeling. It's everything." On January 25, 2018, it was announced Boyle would replace Taylor Hall for the All-Star Game, the latter who suffered a hand injury. During the All-Star Skills Competition on January 27, Boyle finished second in the Accuracy Shooting challenge. At the end of the 2017–18 season, Boyle was selected as the Devils' nomination for the Bill Masterton Memorial Trophy. On April 16, Boyle engaged in a fight with Tampa Bay defenseman Mikhail Sergachev. After both players were restrained, Boyle made threatening comments towards Sergachev, saying, "I'm gonna kill you." On April 21, Boyle was declared as the finalist for the Bill Masterton Memorial Trophy, which he subsequently won on June 20.

The following year, Boyle returned to the Devils and played in his 700th NHL game on October 25. On November 5, Hockey Fights Cancer night, he recorded his first career NHL hat trick in a 5–1 win over the Pittsburgh Penguins.

=== Nashville Predators ===
On February 6, 2019, Boyle was traded to the Nashville Predators in exchange for a 2019 second-round pick.

=== Florida Panthers ===
As a free agent at the conclusion of his contract with the Predators and despite NHL interest, Boyle went unsigned over the summer. Remaining a free agent leading into the 2019–20 season, Boyle signed a one-year, $940,000 contract with the Florida Panthers on October 21, 2019.

=== Pittsburgh Penguins ===
After not playing in the 2020–21 season, Boyle was signed to a professional tryout contract (PTO) by the Pittsburgh Penguins on September 3, 2021. On October 12, 2021, it was announced that Boyle's tryout was successful, and he had signed a one-year, $750,000 contract with the Penguins. That same day, he appeared in his first NHL game since August 7, 2020, scoring a goal in a 6–2 victory against one of his former teams, the Tampa Bay Lightning.

== Broadcasting career ==
On March 22, 2023, Boyle announced his retirement from professional ice hockey and that he would subsequently join NHL Network as an analyst.

== Personal life ==
Boyle is the seventh of 13 children in his family. Boyle's younger brother Timothy was drafted in the fourth round of the 2012 NHL entry draft by the Ottawa Senators.

In 1998, when Boyle was 14 years old, his father Arthur was diagnosed with renal cell carcinoma, a type of kidney cancer. Given a terminal diagnosis, he travelled to Medjugorje in Bosnia and Herzegovina, a Catholic pilgrimage site. When he returned home, a CT scan showed that his cancer had shrunk significantly, a fact he attributes to his journey. As of 2015 he was living cancer free and leading annual trips to the site.

Boyle married his wife in 2014, and they have two children.

On September 19, 2017, Boyle released a statement announcing he had been diagnosed with chronic myelogenous leukemia, a form of blood and bone marrow cancer treatable by medication, adding that was the cause of his absence over the summer of training camp. On October 24, 2018, Boyle announced that his leukemia was in full molecular remission but he would remain on medication.

== Career statistics ==
=== Regular season and playoffs ===
			Regular season					Playoffs
Season	Team	League	GP	G	A	Pts	PIM	GP	G	A	Pts	PIM
2000–01	Saint Sebastian's School	HS-Prep	25	20	19	39	23	—	—	—	—	—
2001–02	Saint Sebastian's School	HS-Prep	28	21	26	47	22	—	—	—	—	—
2002–03	Saint Sebastian's School	HS-Prep	31	32	31	63	46	—	—	—	—	—
2003–04	Boston College	HE	35	5	3	8	36	—	—	—	—	—
2004–05	Boston College	HE	40	19	8	27	64	—	—	—	—	—
2005–06	Boston College	HE	42	22	30	52	90	—	—	—	—	—
2006–07	Boston College	HE	42	19	34	53	104	—	—	—	—	—
2006–07	Manchester Monarchs	AHL	2	0	0	0	2	16	3	5	8	13
2007–08	Manchester Monarchs	AHL	70	31	31	62	87	—	—	—	—	—
2007–08	Los Angeles Kings	NHL	8	4	1	5	4	—	—	—	—	—
2008–09	Los Angeles Kings	NHL	28	4	1	5	42	—	—	—	—	—
2008–09	Manchester Monarchs	AHL	42	10	11	21	73	—	—	—	—	—
2009–10	New York Rangers	NHL	71	4	2	6	47	—	—	—	—	—
2010–11	New York Rangers	NHL	82	21	14	35	74	5	0	0	0	6
2011–12	New York Rangers	NHL	82	11	15	26	59	17	3	3	6	15
2012–13	New York Rangers	NHL	38	2	3	5	29	11	3	2	5	2
2013–14	New York Rangers	NHL	82	6	12	18	56	25	3	5	8	19
2014–15	Tampa Bay Lightning	NHL	82	15	9	24	54	25	1	1	2	10
2015–16	Tampa Bay Lightning	NHL	76	13	7	20	57	17	5	0	5	20
2016–17	Tampa Bay Lightning	NHL	54	13	9	22	48	—	—	—	—	—
2016–17	Toronto Maple Leafs	NHL	21	0	3	3	18	6	0	2	2	6
2017–18	New Jersey Devils	NHL	69	13	10	23	45	5	0	0	0	14
2018–19	New Jersey Devils	NHL	47	13	6	19	22	—	—	—	—	—
2018–19	Nashville Predators	NHL	26	5	0	5	16	3	0	2	2	2
2019–20	Florida Panthers	NHL	39	6	9	15	17	4	1	0	1	12
2021–22	Pittsburgh Penguins	NHL	66	11	10	21	27	6	0	2	2	0
NHL totals			871	141	111	252	615	124	16	17	33	106

Medal record

Representing United States

Ice hockey

World Championships
Bronze medal – third place	2021 Latvia	

=== International ===
Year	Team	Event	Result	GP	G	A	Pts	PIM
2021	United States	WC	3rd place, bronze medalist(s)	10	2	1	3	4
Senior totals				10	2	1	3	4

== Awards and honors ==
Award	Year
College
Hockey East All-Tournament Team	2005, 2006, 2007
Hockey East Tournament MVP	2005
All-Hockey East First Team	2005–06, 2006–07
AHCA East Second-Team All-American	2005–06
AHCA East First-Team All-American	2006–07
All-NCAA All-Tournament Team	2007
AHL
All-Rookie Team	2007–08
NHL
All-Star Game	2018
Bill Masterton Memorial Trophy	2018

Awards and achievements
Preceded by Dustin Brown	Los Angeles Kings first-round draft pick 2003	Succeeded by Jeff Tambellini
Preceded by Chris Collins	Hockey East Scoring Champion; 2007	Succeeded by Bryan Ewing
Preceded by Jimmy Howard	William Flynn Tournament Most Valuable Player; 2005	Succeeded by David Van der Gulik
Preceded by Craig Anderson	Bill Masterton Memorial Trophy winner 2018	Succeeded by Robin Lehner
