= David Van der Gulik =

Canadian ice hockey player (born 1983)

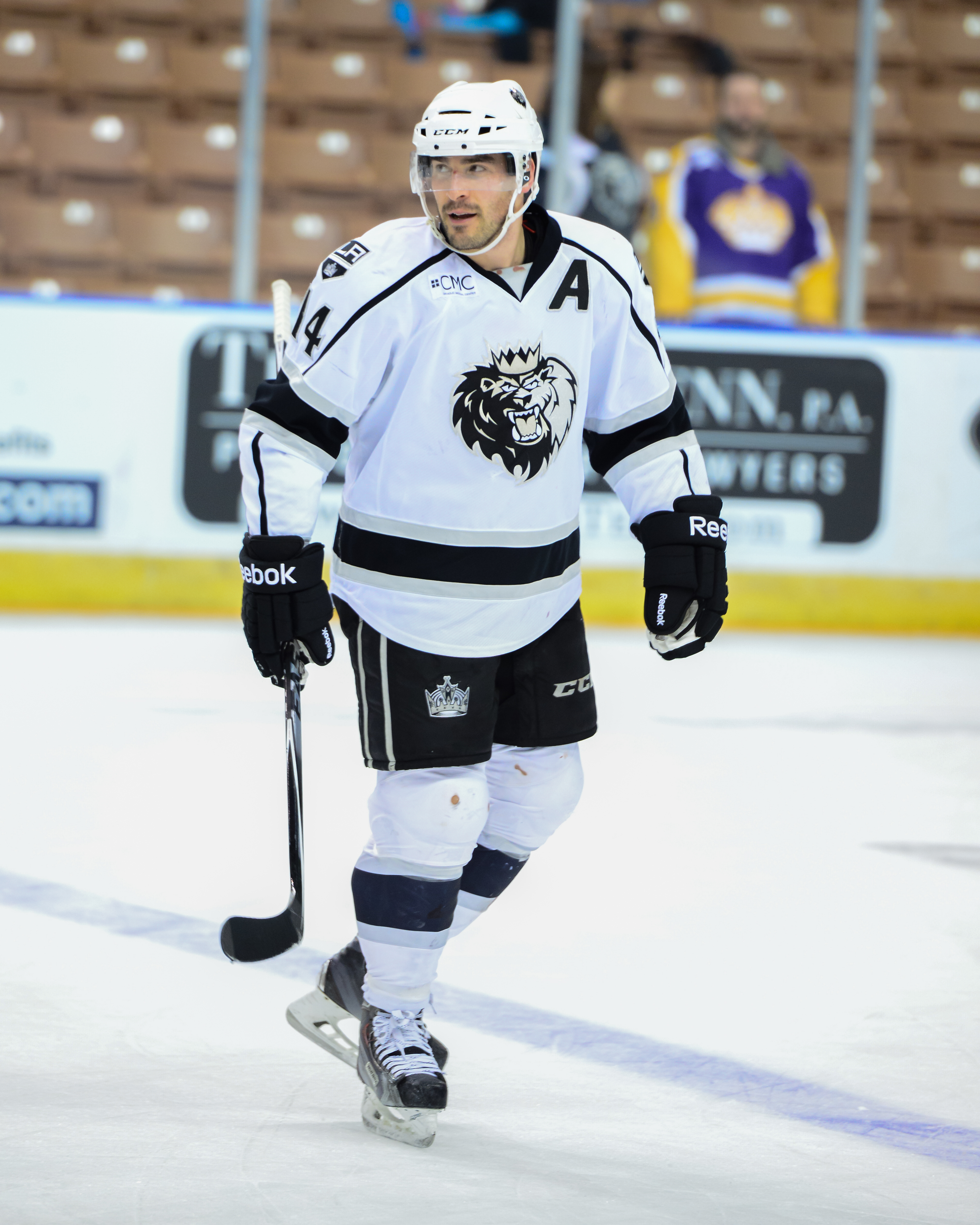
- Born: April 20, 1983 (age 43) Abbotsford, British Columbia, Canada
- Height: 5 ft 11 in (180 cm)
- Weight: 185 lb (84 kg; 13 st 3 lb)
- Position: Right wing
- Shot: Left
- Played for: Calgary Flames; Colorado Avalanche; Los Angeles Kings; Düsseldorfer EG
- NHL draft: 206th overall, 2002; Calgary Flames
- Playing career: 2006–2016

David Van der Gulik (born April 20, 1983) is a Canadian former professional ice hockey right winger. He was a draft pick of the Calgary Flames, selected 206th overall in the 2002 NHL entry draft, and appeared in six games with the team in 2008–09 before spending four seasons with the Colorado Avalanche and his last North American season with the Los Angeles Kings.

== Playing career ==
=== Amateur ===
As a youth, Van der Gulik played in the 1997 Quebec International Pee-Wee Hockey Tournament with a minor ice hockey team from Abbotsford, British Columbia.

Following three seasons of Junior A hockey as an offensive star with the Chilliwack Chiefs of the British Columbia Hockey League, Van der Gulik was selected in the seventh round, 206th overall in the 2002 NHL Entry Draft by the Calgary Flames. He then committed to play College hockey for Boston University, and in 2002–03, Van der Gulik scored 10 goals and 20 points in 40 games as a freshman to be named to the Hockey East All-Rookie Team in 2003.

With a slightly undersized physical frame as a winger, Van der Gulik relied on his offensive ability and hardworking mentality to increase his goal totals in each of his sophomore and junior years. Despite persisting with an abdominal injury in the latter part of his junior campaign he failed to heal prior to his senior year with the Terriers in 2005–06. After missing the first few months of the season with the still undiagnosable injury, Van der Gulik was initially a candidate to be red-shirted and receive another year of college eligibility. However, with ambitions to turn pro the following year, the vexing injury subsided, and Van der Gulik set up the winning goal in his return on December 30, 2005, against Merrimack College. In 25 games as co-captain he totaled 22 points including scoring 2 hat-tricks in the playoffs to help BU progress to the Hockey East finals. Over his four-year Terrier career he amassed 52 goals for 93 points in 141 games and subsequently earned selection in BU's All Decade Team.

=== Professional ===
After finishing his collegiate career, Van der Gulik was signed to a two-year entry-level contract with the Calgary Flames on May 22, 2006. Attending Calgary's 2006–07 training camp he was then assigned to American Hockey League affiliate, the Omaha Ak-Sar-Ben Knights to start the year. In his first professional season he led all Knights with 80 games and posted 16 goals for 43 points to help Omaha qualify for their first and only playoff appearance. As a rookie, he also led the team with four short handed goals while also setting an impressive franchise record in Plus/minus (+27).

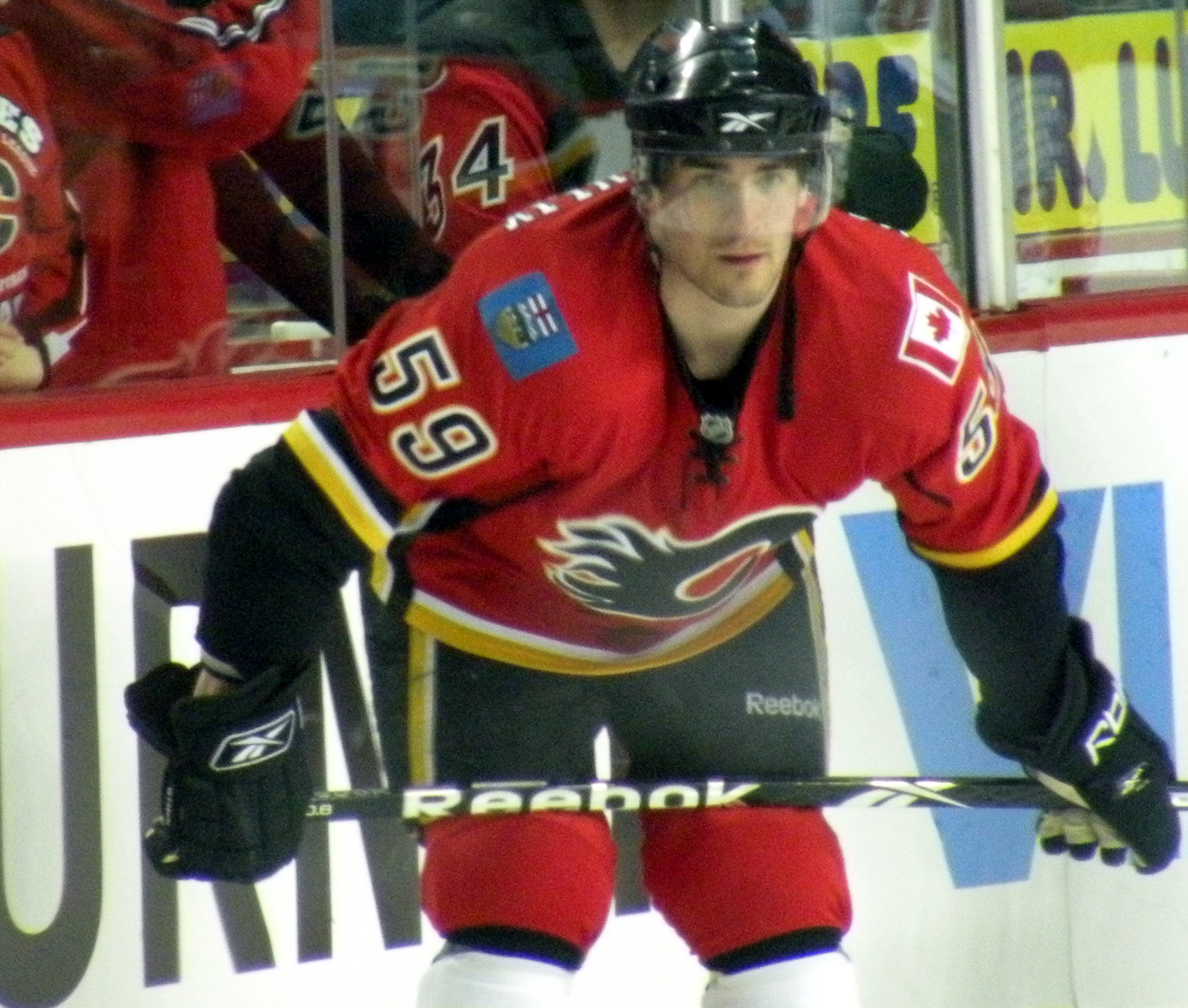
Van der Gulik during his tenure with the Flames.

In the 2007–08 season Van der Gulik followed the Knights relocation to Quad City and established himself among the Flames offensive leaders in with 19 goals and 42 points. On a largely underwhelming Quad City team, Van der Gulik proved defensively responsible, finishing as the only Quad City forward in the positive in Plus/minus (+3). On July 1, 2007, he was re-signed as a restricted free agent to a two-year contract by the Flames. Van der Gulik was again reassigned by the Flames to Quad City for the 2008–09 season. Established as an energetic two-way role player he was recalled by Calgary on February 26, 2009, and made his National Hockey League debut, leading Calgary with 6 shots, the following night against the Minnesota Wild. On March 3 he recorded his first NHL point, an assist to set up Warren Peters first NHL goal, in a 6–3 victory over the Ottawa Senators. He finished with six games with the Flames, recording two assists.

Van der Gulik spent the entire 2009–10 season in his hometown with new Flames AHL affiliate, the Abbotsford Heat, finishing second in scoring with 40 points. After four years within the Flames organization he left following the season, signing as a free agent to a one-year contract with the Colorado Avalanche on July 2, 2010. Following attending the Avalanche's training camp, he was reassigned during the pre-season to the Avalanche's AHL affiliate, the Lake Erie Monsters, to begin the 2010–11 season.

His first NHL goal was scored on November 4, 2010, against Cory Schneider of the Vancouver Canucks.

On July 1, 2014, Van der Gulik ended his four-year tenure with the Avalanche organization to sign a one-year contract as a free agent with the Los Angeles Kings. After attending the Kings training camp, Van der Gulik was assigned to AHL affiliate, the Manchester Monarchs. A month into the 2014–15 season, he was recalled and appeared in his first and only game with the Kings, in a 3–0 shutout loss to the Pittsburgh Penguins on October 30, 2014. Upon his return to the AHL, Van der Gulik added a veteran presence in scoring 25 points in 57 games, to contribute in helping the Monarchs capture the Calder Cup.

As a free agent from the Kings in the off-season, Van der Gulik went unsigned over the summer. On November 2, 2015, with little NHL interest, Van der Gulik turned to Europe and signed for the remainder of the season in Germany with Düsseldorfer EG of the DEL.

== Career statistics ==
			Regular season					Playoffs
Season	Team	League	GP	G	A	Pts	PIM	GP	G	A	Pts	PIM
1999–2000	Abbotsford Pilots	PIJHL	41	35	46	81	84	—	—	—	—	—
1999–2000	Chilliwack Chiefs	BCHL	4	0	1	1	0	—	—	—	—	—
2000–01	Chilliwack Chiefs	BCHL	60	42	38	80	61	5	1	5	6	4
2001–02	Chilliwack Chiefs	BCHL	56	38	62	100	90	13	8	11	19	—
2002–03	Boston University	HE	40	10	10	20	56	—	—	—	—	—
2003–04	Boston University	HE	35	13	7	20	74	—	—	—	—	—
2004–05	Boston University	HE	41	18	13	31	48	—	—	—	—	—
2005–06	Boston University	HE	25	11	11	22	26	—	—	—	—	—
2006–07	Omaha Ak–Sar–Ben Knights	AHL	80	16	27	43	69	6	0	2	2	4
2007–08	Quad City Flames	AHL	80	19	23	42	62	—	—	—	—	—
2008–09	Quad City Flames	AHL	73	17	19	36	58	—	—	—	—	—
2008–09	Calgary Flames	NHL	6	0	2	2	0	—	—	—	—	—
2009–10	Abbotsford Heat	AHL	64	16	24	40	58	13	4	2	6	10
2010–11	Lake Erie Monsters	AHL	48	15	21	36	25	7	2	2	4	8
2010–11	Colorado Avalanche	NHL	6	1	2	3	2	—	—	—	—	—
2011–12	Lake Erie Monsters	AHL	40	12	16	28	36	—	—	—	—	—
2011–12	Colorado Avalanche	NHL	25	1	5	6	2	—	—	—	—	—
2012–13	Lake Erie Monsters	AHL	60	18	17	35	58	—	—	—	—	—
2012–13	Colorado Avalanche	NHL	9	0	2	2	6	—	—	—	—	—
2013–14	Lake Erie Monsters	AHL	33	13	9	22	37	—	—	—	—	—
2013–14	Colorado Avalanche	NHL	2	0	0	0	0	—	—	—	—	—
2014–15	Manchester Monarchs	AHL	57	11	14	25	39	14	2	7	9	6
2014–15	Los Angeles Kings	NHL	1	0	0	0	0	—	—	—	—	—
2015–16	Düsseldorfer EG	DEL	16	3	1	4	6	5	1	0	1	8
AHL totals			535	137	170	307	453	40	8	13	21	28
NHL totals			49	2	11	13	10	—	—	—	—	—

== Awards and honours ==
Award	Year
College
All-Hockey East Rookie Team	2002–03
Hockey East All-Tournament Team	2006
AHL
Calder Cup (Manchester Monarchs)	2015

Awards and achievements
Preceded by Brian Boyle	William Flynn Tournament Most Valuable Player; 2006	Succeeded by Brock Bradford
