= Invited error =

Legal concept

Invited error refers to a trial court's error against which a party cannot complain to an appellate court because the party encouraged or prompted the error by its own conduct during the trial. The original goal of the invited error doctrine was to prohibit a party from setting up an error at trial and then complaining of it on appeal. In State v. Pam, the State of Washington intentionally set up an error in order to create a test case for appeal. Since then, the doctrine has been applied even in cases where the error resulted from neither negligence nor bad faith. See, e.g., State v. Studd, 137 533, 547 (Wn.2d 1999).

"Under the doctrine of 'invited error' a party cannot successfully take advantage of error committed by the court at his request." Jentick v. Pacific Gas & Elec. Co. (1941) 18 Cal.2d 117, 121 [114 P.2d 343]. The rule precludes a party from challenging a jury instruction if he proposed it or a similar instruction. Weirum v. RKO General, Inc. (1975) 15 Cal.3d 40, 50 [123 Cal.Rptr. 468, 539 P.2d 36].

Invited error, while inclusive of any active response, does not include acquiescing to an action of the court one has filed an objection to. "Under the doctrine of invited error, when a party by its own conduct induces the commission of error, it may not claim on appeal that the judgment should be reversed because of that error. (People v. Perez (1979) 23 Cal.3d 545, 549-550, fn. 3 [153 Cal.Rptr. 40, 591 P.2d 63]; Jentick v. Pacific Gas & Elec. Co. (1941) 18 Cal.2d 117 [114 P.2d 343]...) But the doctrine does not apply when a party, while making the appropriate objections, acquiesces in a judicial determination." Mary M. v. City of Los Angeles (1991) 54 Cal.3d 202, 212; [285 Cal.Rptr. 99; 814 P.2d 1341].

== See also ==
- Forfeiture and waiver
