= Forfeiture and waiver =

Forfeiture and waiver are two concepts that U.S. courts apply in determining whether reversible error has occurred. Waiver is the voluntary relinquishment, surrender or abandonment of some known right or privilege. Forfeiture is the act of losing or surrendering something as a penalty for a mistake or fault or failure to perform, etc.

Per U.S. v. Olano, if a defendant has waived a right, then he cannot obtain redress in appellate court. If he has merely forfeited the right, e.g. by failing to raise a timely objection, then the standard of review become plain error pursuant to Federal Rule of Criminal Procedure 52(b). This means that, whereas if he had raised a timely objection, the burden of proof would have been on the opposing party to show that the error was harmless error, now the burden of proof is on the aggrieved party to show that the error was plain error. Moreover, in federal cases, the U.S. Court of Appeals may or may not choose to exercise its discretion to correct the plain error. It usually will not, unless failure to correct it would result in a miscarriage of justice that would seriously affect the fairness, integrity or reputation of the justice system. However, the courts relax their application of the plain-error test in cases involving constitutional error.

An example of a waiver would be invited error would be if a defendant requested that the court impose a condition of supervised release. In such a case, he could not later challenge the legality of the condition. When a defendant raises an argument and then abandons it, he may be viewed as having waived that argument. For instance, a defendant raised objections to the presentence report in his case but it was ruled that he waived those objections when his counsel and the judge had the following conversation:

THE COURT: All right. There was a presentence report noted. There were objections. I think that all of those now have been resolved, have they not, Mr. Wagman?

MR. WAGMAN: Yes, Your Honor.

In another case, it was ruled that a Defendant could not have "affirmatively abandoned" an argument that he never made.

Courts have noted, however, that as a practical matter, a defendant's consent to a probation condition is likely to be nominal where consent is given only to avoid imprisonment.
