= Waivers (NHL) =

National Hockey League labor management procedure

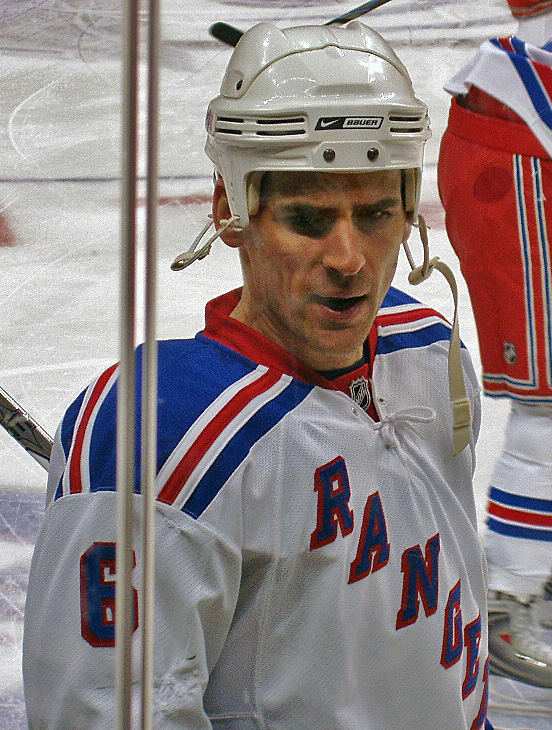
Former NHL All-Star Wade Redden was waived in 2010 by the New York Rangers.

Waivers are a National Hockey League (NHL) labour management procedure that requires an NHL team, under specific circumstances, to make a professional ice hockey player's contract and rights available for all other NHL teams to claim. They usually arise when a team wants to send a player down to its American Hockey League (AHL) affiliate, or terminate a player's contract early, which can only happen after that player has been offered to all NHL teams and every team "waives" the right to claim the player.

A player being offered through this procedure is typically referred to as being "placed on waivers". If no team makes a claim within the waiver period, the player is said to have "cleared waivers". Waivers are similar to the designated for assignment process in Major League Baseball.

== Minor league assignment procedure ==
In the NHL, each player signs what is, or is a variation of, a standard NHL player's contract. The contract specifies that the team has exclusive rights to the player playing in the NHL. Once an NHL player has played in a certain number of games or a set number of seasons has passed since the signing of his first NHL contract (see here), that player must be offered to all of the other NHL teams before he can be assigned to a minor league affiliate. In the 2005 Collective Bargaining Agreement (CBA) assignment waivers applies only to loans from an NHL club to its American Hockey League (AHL) affiliate.

After a player has been designated for assignment, the other 31 NHL teams can put in a claim or waive their claim for that player. The claims process starts at noon Mountain Time and ends 24 hours later. If only one team makes a claim for the player, then he will be transferred to the claiming team. If more than one team makes a claim, then the player will be transferred to the team having the lowest percentage of possible points in league standings at the time of the request for waivers. When a waiver claim has been secured, the claiming team must pay a transfer fee to the original club, though this fee is not counted against the salary cap. If waivers are requested outside the playing season, or before November 1, then the player shall be transferred to the team with the lowest points in the preceding season. If no team places a claim, the player can be sent to a minor league affiliate. During the 2020–21 season, a player that cleared waivers could be assigned to his team's taxi squad, which was intended to allow a team to have enough players to play in the event of COVID-19 issues.

When a player clears waivers and is sent down and then is called up again, he does not have to clear waivers to be sent down again unless he has played ten games or has been "up" for 30 days.

== Re-entry waivers ==
The 2005 NHL-NHLPA collective bargaining agreement (CBA) introduced "re-entry waivers". With limited exceptions, any player who was subject to waivers before assignment to the minors must clear re-entry waivers before being called back up if said player is on a one-way contract or a two-way contract with an AHL salary in excess of $105,000. Exceptions are players who have played in over 320 professional games (180 for goaltenders) and have not spent more than 80 games on an NHL roster in the past two seasons or 40 games during the previous season. The procedure to make a claim on re-entry waivers is the same; however, teams who claim players on re-entry waivers are only responsible for half the salary and cap hit, while the original team is responsible for the other half, unless the claimed player is later assigned to the AHL again before his contract has expired, in which case the salary and cap hit comes off the books of both teams.

Re-entry waivers were eliminated by the CBA ratified in January 2013.

== Return waivers ==
Players who play ice hockey outside North America during a regular season and who are not on loan from or whose playing rights are not already owned by an NHL club (that is, the player is not already on a team's 90-player reserve list such as a qualified restricted free agent or a draft pick) must also be placed on waivers if they are signed to play in the NHL midseason. If the player is picked up by another NHL club on waivers, the player must be placed on waivers again before a further trade or loan can take place.

== Unconditional waivers ==
A third type of waivers, "unconditional waivers", applies when a player is to be given an unconditional release from his contract, either by buyout or for the purpose of contract termination.

A team may terminate the contract of a player for breach of contract at any time. Additionally, a player and team may mutually agree to terminate a contract at any time. This process can only be completed if the player clears unconditional waivers.

In order to buy-out a player, NHL teams give notice to the player and the league that they intend to buy-out a player's rights under the terms of the CBA by submitting the player through unconditional waivers. These waivers can only be requested during two periods:

1. Between June 15, or 48 hours after the conclusion of the Stanley Cup Final series if it ends later, and June 30 of each year.
2. If a club has team- or player-elected salary arbitration cases, within 48 hours of the last arbitration award or settlement of the last arbitration case prior to the arbitration hearing.

Such a player must have been on a club's 90-player reserve list at the previous trade deadline.

== Use of waivers in salary cap era ==
Salaries of players playing for an NHL team count against its salary cap, while the salaries of players playing for a team's minor league affiliates do not. NHL teams have waived players with high salaries, thereby freeing up salary cap space for other signings. In 2010, Wade Redden of the New York Rangers, Sheldon Souray of the Edmonton Oilers and Jeff Finger of the Toronto Maple Leafs were all assigned to their team's AHL affiliate without any other team putting in a claim.

In a more interesting case, following the 2011 NHL pre-season, forward Sean Avery of the New York Rangers was waived to the AHL. As Avery had been claimed off re-entry waivers from the Dallas Stars, the cap hit had been split between the Rangers and Stars, but when Avery was demoted to the AHL again, the cap hit came off both teams' books. As a result, the Stars, who had been using Avery's re-entry waiver loss to reach the salary floor for the 2011–12 season, had to trade for winger Eric Nystrom to reach the salary floor.

Under the 2005 CBA, if an NHL player is being sent to an NHL affiliate team in the AHL and is put through waivers and clears successfully, then his salary will not count against the respective NHL team's salary cap. The player is still paid his full salary. There is an exception to this rule; if the player has a contract that took effect after a player's 35th birthday, then that player's salary would still count against the NHL cap. Under the 2013 CBA, a team only derives a specific savings from demoting a player on a one-way contract to the AHL. This savings is calculated as league minimum plus $375,000.

If a player is claimed on waivers, then the claiming team is responsible for the rest of their contract.

Re-entry waivers had existed under the 2005 CBA, under which if a player cleared waivers and was sent down to the minors, and then recalled during the season, and his salary was more than $105,000 in the AHL (essentially, any player not on an entry-level or two-way contract), he was subject to re-entry waivers where if a team claimed him they are only responsible for half the salary for the remainder of the contract. Re-entry waivers were eliminated in the 2013 CBA.

== See also ==
- Waivers (disambiguation)
- NHL salary cap
- NHL Collective Bargaining Agreement
- NHL waiver draft
