= Waiver =

Surrender of a right or privilege

A waiver is the relinquishment of a legal right. Whether a waiver is enforceable depends on the jurisdiction and the circumstances in which it is made. Courts may consider whether it was voluntary and informed, whether its terms were clear, and whether enforcing it would conflict with law or public policy.

Waiver may also arise from a party's conduct in legal proceedings. In Insurance Corp. of Ireland v. Compagnie des Bauxites de Guinee, the U.S. Supreme Court held that a party's refusal to comply with an order to produce evidence could result in waiver of its right to contest personal jurisdiction. Waivers are also used in public administration: under Section 1115 of the Social Security Act, the United States federal government may allow states to operate Medicaid or the Children's Health Insurance Program differently from the usual statutory requirements, while local authorities in the United Kingdom may waive limits imposed by their standing orders in specified circumstances.

== Enforceability ==
The following represent a general overview of considerations; specifics may vary dramatically depending on the jurisdiction.

Key factors that some courts (depending on jurisdiction) may look at while determining the applicability of a waiver:

- In some jurisdictions, one may not prospectively waive liability for some or all intentional activities
- Waivers generally must be made voluntarily and with the full knowledge (or the ability to know) of the right being waived
- The waiver should be unambiguous and clear to a reasonable person
- In some jurisdictions (not including the United States), it may be necessary that the parties to the waiver have equal bargaining power
- A waiver may have limited application where one contracts for an "essential service" such that it may violate public policy for liability to be waived
- A waiver that the courts will not enforce because the purpose of the agreement is to achieve an illegal end constitutes an illegal agreement.

== Examples ==
=== Personal jurisdiction ===
In the case of Insurance Corp. of Ireland v. Compagnie des Bauxites de Guinee, 456 U.S. 694 (1982) the United States Supreme Court decided that when a court orders a party to produce proof on a certain point, and that party refuses to comply with the court's order, the court may deem that refusal to be a waiver of the right to contest that point and assume that the proof would show whatever the opposing party claims that it would.

In that court case, the defendant had argued that the court lacked personal jurisdiction over it but refused a court order to produce evidence of this lack of jurisdiction. The defendant argued that, because the court lacked jurisdiction, the court had no authority to issue an order to show proof of the lack of jurisdiction. The Supreme Court rejected that argument and determined that the defendant's refusal to comply waived the right to contest jurisdiction, just as if it had never contested jurisdiction at all.

=== Illegal waiver or agreement ===
In US states such as California, a waiver is not lawful when it is contrary to an express provision of law, its implicit policy, or good morals. Furthermore, one cannot waive responsibility for violation of law, willful injury to a person or property of another, for fraud, or waive their residential tenant rights.

=== Banking regulation ===
Federal law may also provide for waivers or exceptions from particular regulatory requirements. A 1994 United States law generally restricts interstate bank acquisitions that would result in a banking organization controlling more than 10 percent of the nation's insured deposits; by 2010, several large banks had reportedly received waivers from the requirement or used exceptions to exceed the threshold.

=== State health programs ===
Under Section 1115 of the Social Security Act, the United States federal government may issue waivers to individual states so that they may provide Medicaid or the Children's Health Insurance Program (CHIP) in different ways from how the law typically mandates provision.

=== Local government ===
In the United Kingdom, standing orders adopted by local councils typically designate limits on the level of authority delegated to staff to take action without approval by elected members, with provision being made to waive these limits in appropriate circumstances such as urgency or where the requirements for competition in public procurement cannot be engaged.

== See also ==
- Disclaimer
- Due process
- Estoppel
- Illegal agreement
- Loan waiver
- Tort reform
- Waiver and forfeiture
