= Whitewash waiver =

Proposed resolution regarding stockholder rights

Whitewash waiver or whitewash resolution is a corporate law concept originating in Hong Kong and Singapore. It refers to a proposed resolution for the waiver of rights of independent shareholders to receive a mandatory takeover from the undertaking shareholders and its concert parties for the ordinary shares of the company not already owned or controlled by them.

In some cases an investor will apply to the executive for the whitewash waiver, which, if granted, will be subject to the approval of independent shareholders.
