= Reversible error =

Error of sufficient gravity to warrant reversal of a judgment on appeal

In United States law, a reversible error is an error of sufficient gravity to warrant reversal of a judgment on appeal. It is an error by the trier of law (judge), or the trier of fact (the jury, or the judge if it is a bench trial), or malfeasance by one of the trying attorneys, which results in an unfair trial. It is to be distinguished from harmless errors which do not rise to a level which brings the validity of the judgment into question and thus do not lead to a reversal upon appeal.

== Reversible error criteria ==
A finding of reversible error requires that one or more of the appellant's "substantial rights" be affected, or the evidence in question be of such character as to have affected the outcome of the trial. (Note: See e.g., Montana Petroleum Tank Release Compensation Bd. v. Crumley's, Inc., 174 P.3d 948 (Montana, 2008).) The criteria for determining what constitutes a "substantial right" is somewhat vague, however, and varies from case to case, each presenting a slightly different interpretation of which rights are essential, or significant enough to warrant this sort of legal protection. Therefore, reversible errors resulting from the violation of an individual's "substantial right(s)" must be considered on an individual basis.

== Examples ==
Reversible errors include:

- Judge did not follow the law.
- seating (selecting) a juror who has manifested impermissible bias to one party or the other,
- admitting evidence which should have been excluded under the rules of evidence,
- excluding evidence which a party was entitled to have admitted,
- giving an incorrect legal instruction to a jury,
- failure to declare a mistrial when continuing with trial amounts to a denial of due process, or
- conversely, granting a mistrial in a criminal case if the defendant objects, unless the grant was necessary to correct manifest injustice.
- hearing a case the court does not have jurisdiction to hear.
- allowing a case to proceed which was properly time-barred.
  - failing to follow a judicial rule set by a higher court. (Note: For example, in Fletcher-Harlee Corp., Appellant v. Pote Concrete Contractors, Inc., the appeal court noted that in civil rights cases, courts must allow amendment when dismissing a case for failure to state a claim.)

If an appellate court determines that reversible error occurred, it may reverse the judgement of the lower court and order a new trial on such terms and conditions as are found to be just. Technically, attorney misconduct is not reversible error, but the failure of a judge to remedy it during the trial is reversible error. In cases such as unfairly or illegally concealing evidence, there is no error on the part of the court but the court's decision may still be vacated and the matter returned for a new trial, because there is no other way for justice to be granted.
