= Chris Canty (defensive lineman) =

American football player (born 1982)

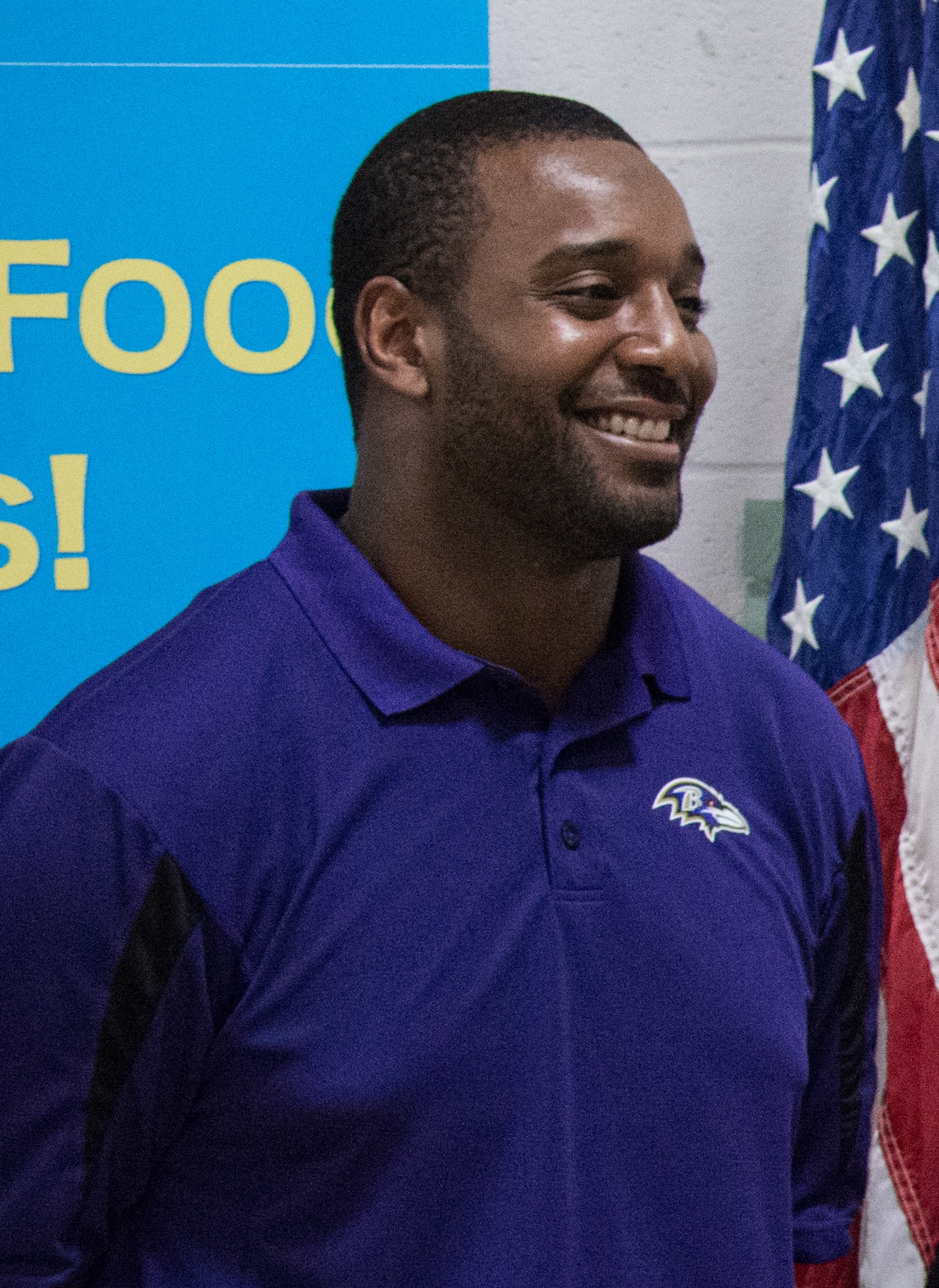
- Canty in 2014

No. 99
- Position: Defensive end

Personal information
- Born: November 10, 1982 (age 44); The Bronx, New York, U.S.
- Listed height: 6 ft 7 in (2.01 m)
- Listed weight: 320 lb (145 kg)

Career information
- High school: Charlotte Latin School (Charlotte, North Carolina)
- College: Virginia (2001–2004)
- NFL draft: 2005: 4th round, 132nd overall pick

Career history
- Dallas Cowboys (2005–2008); New York Giants (2009–2012); Baltimore Ravens (2013–2015)

Awards and highlights
- Super Bowl champion (XLVI); 2× Second-team All-ACC (2002, 2003)

Career NFL statistics
- Total tackles: 356
- Sacks: 22.5
- Forced fumbles: 5
- Fumble recoveries: 1
- Pass deflections: 19
- Stats at Pro Football Reference

Christopher Lee Canty (born November 10, 1982) is an American former professional football player who was a defensive end in the National Football League (NFL). He played college football for the Virginia Cavaliers. Canty was selected by the Dallas Cowboys in the fourth round of the 2005 NFL draft. He also played for the New York Giants, winning Super Bowl XLVI with them over the New England Patriots in 2011, and the Baltimore Ravens. After his playing career, he became a sports radio host.

== Early life ==
Chris Canty was born in The Bronx, New York. He grew up in the Co-op City section of the borough until he moved to Charlotte, North Carolina at age 15. He did not play football until his junior year. Canty helped lead his team Charlotte Latin School to the North Carolina Independent Schools Athletic Association (NCISAA) State Championship in 1999, on his way to earning All-Conference and All-State honors as a senior tight end and defensive end, after recording 20 receptions for 400 yards and 89 tackles and seven sacks.

He finished his prep career with 161 tackles, 12 sacks and two fumble recoveries. He was also a two-year letterman and all-conference honoree for the basketball team.

== College career ==
While at Virginia, Canty was a two-time second-team All-Atlantic Coast Conference selection. He led all conference defensive linemen in tackles as a sophomore and junior.

=== Sophomore (2002) ===
In 2002, despite missing three games due to injury, Canty finished his sophomore season with 86 tackles, four tackles for losses, four pass deflections, three quarterback pressures, three fumble recoveries, and two sacks while starting eight of the 11 games.

=== Junior (2003) ===
In 2003, Canty was named second-team All-ACC, Lineman of the Year in Virginia and recipient of the Ned McDonald Award as UVA's Most Outstanding Defensive Player after registering a career-high 104 tackles, 12 tackles for losses, 12 pressures and four sacks. He became only the second down lineman in school history to record more than 100 tackles in a season. His schoolwork also helped him earn All-ACC Academic honors.

=== Senior (2004) ===
In 2004, he received his bachelor's degree in African American studies in May and took graduate course work in secondary education during his senior year. Canty's season was cut short in the fourth game of the season when he tore his ACL, MCL and PCL in his left knee. At the time, he had posted 30 tackles, seven tackles for losses, a sack and a forced fumble.

=== Eye injury ===
Canty suffered a serious eye injury at a nightclub in Scottsdale, Arizona, in late January 2005. While Canty said he was nothing more than a bystander in an altercation, he evidently was hit with a glass bottle in left eye, forcing him to have immediate surgery to repair a detached retina.

== Professional career ==
Pre-draft measurables
Height	Weight
6 ft 7 1/4 in (2.01 m)	286 lb (130 kg)
Values from NFL Combine

=== Dallas Cowboys ===
Canty was selected in the fourth round (132nd overall pick) of the 2005 NFL draft by the Dallas Cowboys. After entering his senior season as a potential first round draft choice, he fell because of the knee injury he suffered as a senior, as well as a detached retina in his left eye, that was inflicted in the spring prior to the draft. The Cowboys traded their fifth round pick in 2005 and a fourth rounder in 2006 to the Philadelphia Eagles in order to move up. Canty signed a three-year, $1.3 million contract with the Cowboys.

After working throughout the spring and summer to rehabilitate his knee and recover from the injured retina, Canty was on the field one week into training camp. As a rookie, he registered 35 tackles (24 solo), was second on the team with five tackles for loss and tied for fourth on the club with 2.5 sacks.

Canty played in the season opener at the San Diego Chargers and recorded his first NFL tackle along with a quarterback pressure. Against the Washington Redskins, he added his first career sack with a third-quarter tackle of Mark Brunell. He was third on the team, first among linemen with a season-high six tackles at the Oakland Raiders. He also added a half sack and a tackle for a loss. Canty had two tackles against the Philadelphia Eagles as the defense limited the Eagles to 129 total yards, including just 19 on the ground, the fourth lowest rushing total in franchise history. Canty had a season-high two quarterback pressures against the Arizona Cardinals as well as a tackle and a tackle for a loss. At Philadelphia, he played mostly on first and second downs, recorded two tackles, a tackle for a loss and a forced fumble. Canty led all linemen with three tackles and added his second sack of the season against the Denver Broncos. At the New York Giants, he earned his first NFL start, replacing (Greg) Ellis at right end, and recorded four tackles. He started, again, the next week against the Kansas City Chiefs and led all defensive linemen with five tackles despite suffering a sprained ankle during the game. He did not start but did play at Washington after missing two days of practice due to the injured ankle. He recorded two tackles and a tackle for a loss at the Carolina Panthers. In the season finale against the St. Louis Rams, Canty led all defensive linemen with five tackles and also had a tackle for a loss.

In 2006, the team moved to a 3–4 defense and Canty earned the starting role at right defensive end. He went on to start all 16 regular season games and Dallas's lone playoff game. He recorded 33 tackles and 1 sack.

In 2007, he registered 43 tackles (30 solo), 3.5 sacks, and 2 passes defensed. In the Cowboys lone playoff game, their third game against the New York Giants on the season, Canty registered three tackles (two solo), one sack and one pass defensed.

After the Cowboys made the decision to give a five-year extension to Jay Ratliff, on June 11, 2008 season, Canty signed a one-year tender offer worth $2.017 million to remain with the team. He started all 16 games for a third consecutive year, producing 37 tackles (25 solo), 3 sacks and a career-high 5 passes defensed.

=== New York Giants ===
On March 1, 2009, Canty signed with the New York Giants; the six-year contract is worth $42 million, with $17.25 million guaranteed. He was named the starter at right defensive tackle in then team's 4-3 defense, but missed eight games with knee and hamstring injuries. In 2011, he registered career-high marks in tackles (47) and sacks (4).

At the end of the 2011 season, Canty and the Giants appeared in Super Bowl XLVI. He started in the game as the Giants defeated the New England Patriots by a score of 21–17.

On August 27, 2012, Canty was placed on the physically unable to perform list after it was determined he would need more time to recover from off-season knee surgery. On October 20, he was activated off the PUP list. On November 2, he was fined $15,750 for roughing the passer. Canty suffered a sprained MCL on December 23, against the Baltimore Ravens and missed the season finale. After playing in only 9 games, he registered 25 tackles (20 solo) and 3 sacks.

He was released by the Giants on February 6, 2013, in a salary cap move.

=== Baltimore Ravens ===
Canty signed as a free agent with the Baltimore Ravens on March 12, 2013. He registered 30 tackles, 2 sacks and 2 forced fumbles, while playing left defensive end in the Ravens' 3–4 defense. In 2014, he missed five games while battling ankle injuries and a staph infection in his wrist. He was cut by the Ravens on February 27, 2015. The Ravens then signed him again on March 18, 2015.

=== Statistics ===
		Tackles						Fumbles	
Year	Team	G	GS	Total	Solo	Sck	Sfty	FF	FR
2005	DAL	16	2	35	23	2.5	0	1	0
2006	DAL	16	16	33	24	1.0	0	0	0
2007	DAL	16	16	43	30	3.5	0	0	1
2008	DAL	16	16	37	25	3.0	0	0	0
2009	NYG	8	4	13	8	0.5	0	0	0
2010	NYG	16	16	38	27	1.5	0	1	0
2011	NYG	16	16	47	31	4.0	1	0	0
2012	NYG	9	9	26	20	3.0	0	0	0
2013	BAL	15	13	30	20	2.0	0	2	0
2014	BAL	11	11	33	13	0.5	0	1	0
2015	BAL	9	9	19	11	1.0	0	0	0
Total		148	128	354	232	22.5	1	5	1

== Personal life ==
Canty's mother, Shirley, is an ordained United Methodist minister; his father, Joseph Sr., is retired. One of his brothers is the president of Chris's foundation and the other is a college football coach.

Post football Canty began work as a radio personality, first locally in New York City on the "DiPietro, Canty, & Rothenberg" radio program along with former New York Islanders goaltender Rick DiPietro and Dave Rothenberg on ESPN New York 98.7 FM, then nationally on ESPN Radio beginning in 2021. After first being part of the afternoon drive show, Canty—alongside Evan Cohen and Michelle Smallmon, they became hosts ESPN Radio's morning drive show Unsportsmanlike with Cohen, Canty, and Michelle on September 5, 2023, which is also simulcast on ESPNU.
