= Sean Sullivan (ice hockey) =

American-German ice hockey player (born 1984)

- Born: March 29, 1984 (age 42) Boston, Massachusetts, U.S.
- Height: 6 ft 0 in (183 cm)
- Weight: 190 lb (86 kg; 13 st 8 lb)
- Position: Defense
- Shot: Left
- Played for: San Antonio Rampage; Worcester Sharks; Lake Erie Monsters; Modo Hockey; Iserlohn Roosters; Hamburg Freezers; Straubing Tigers; ERC Ingolstadt
- NHL draft: 272nd overall, 2003; Phoenix Coyotes
- Playing career: 2007–2020

Sean Sullivan (born March 29, 1984) is an American former professional ice hockey defenseman. He most notably played in the American Hockey League (AHL) and the Deutsche Eishockey Liga (DEL). Sullivan holds dual citizenship in the US and Germany.

== Playing career ==
A Boston native, Sullivan attended St. Sebastian's School in Needham, before he was recruited to play collegiate hockey with Boston University of the Hockey East. In his tenure at St. Sebastian's, Sullivan co-captained the team, and was an All-League selection in both seasons. In 2003, he led all New England prep defensemen in scoring with 39 points in 2003 to also earn a position in the All-New England Team.

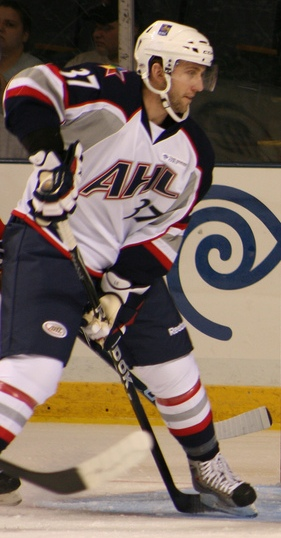
Sullivan at the All-Star Game in 2010.

Primarily a defensive defenseman in his early years with the Terriers, Sullivan was drafted by the Phoenix Coyotes in the 9th round (272nd overall) of the 2003 NHL entry draft. After capturing the HE championship in his Junior year, Sullivan captained the Terriers in his senior year in 2006–07 season and led the team from the blueline to be selected as the Best defensive defenseman in the Hockey East. He was then signed to his first professional two-year entry-level contract with the Phoenix Coyotes on March 27, 2007.

In his third season in 2008–09 with the Coyotes' AHL affiliate, the San Antonio Rampage, Sullivan developed his offensive instincts and led the team amongst defenseman in scoring with 32 points in 65 games. He was consequently re-signed to a one-year extension with the Coyotes on July 20, 2009. Sullivan familiarly started the 2009–10 campaign with the Rampage. In his first 8 games of the season, Sullivan scored 10 points to be awarded the AHL player of the week award and subsequently received his first recall by the Coyotes on October 23 in backup of the injured Zbyněk Michálek. Sullivan was later returned to San Antonio without making his debut to lead the defense in scoring for a second consecutive season with 49 points and earn a place in the 2010 AHL All-Star Game.

On July 12, 2010, Sullivan was signed as an unrestricted free agent by the San Jose Sharks to a one-year contract. He was then assigned to the Sharks affiliate, the Worcester Sharks. In his second season within the Sharks organization on January 26, 2012, he was traded to the Florida Panthers in exchange for Tim Kennedy. He was immediately assigned to the AHL, which marked a return to the San Antonio Rampage.

On July 10, 2012, Sullivan signed a one-year contract with the Colorado Avalanche as a free agent. With the impending lockout coming to affect, Sullivan was assigned directly to the Avalanche's AHL affiliate, the Lake Erie Monsters. Sullivan's 2012–13 season was limited to just 34 games, due to broken jaw suffered mid-season. He returned to health and upon the conclusion of the Monsters campaign he was recalled to the Avalanche, however did not feature in a game.

With the conclusion of his contract expiring, Sullivan signed his first European contract in Sweden, on a one-year deal with Modo Hockey of the Swedish Hockey League on June 7, 2013. In the 2013–14 season, Sullivan failed to solidify a position among the defenseman of Modo and after 10 games he was mutually released from his contract after opting to join the Straubing Tigers of the German DEL on October 13, 2013. Sullivan instantly regained his scoring touch with the Tigers, and despite failing to qualify for the post-season, contributed with 4 goals and 27 points in 40 games.

After a single season with the Iserlohn Roosters, Sullivan joined his third DEL club in three campaigns, in agreeing to a three-year deal with the Hamburg Freezers on June 17, 2015. He became a free agent after the club folded in May 2016.

In October 2016, he returned to old stomping grounds, signing a try-out deal with the Straubing Tigers. On November 29, 2016, he saw his contract extended until the end of the 2016–17 season. Sullivan left the Tigers after his contract had expired and signed with fellow DEL team ERC Ingolstadt in April 2017.

On November 6, 2020, Sullivan announced his retirement from professional hockey.

== Career statistics ==
			Regular season					Playoffs
Season	Team	League	GP	G	A	Pts	PIM	GP	G	A	Pts	PIM
1999–2000	South Boston High School	HSMA
2000–01	St. Sebastian's School	HS Prep
2001–02	St. Sebastian's School	HS Prep	31	3	11	14	4	—	—	—	—	—
2002–03	St. Sebastian's School	HS Prep	41	9	30	39	59	—	—	—	—	—
2003–04	Boston University	HE	36	2	5	7	14	—	—	—	—	—
2004–05	Boston University	HE	41	1	3	4	10	—	—	—	—	—
2005–06	Boston University	HE	40	3	14	17	32	—	—	—	—	—
2006–07	Boston University	HE	38	3	12	15	12	—	—	—	—	—
2006–07	San Antonio Rampage	AHL	7	0	0	0	0	—	—	—	—	—
2007–08	Arizona Sundogs	CHL	22	9	16	25	19	—	—	—	—	—
2007–08	San Antonio Rampage	AHL	34	0	8	8	13	1	0	0	0	4
2008–09	San Antonio Rampage	AHL	65	9	23	32	24	—	—	—	—	—
2009–10	San Antonio Rampage	AHL	77	12	37	49	32	—	—	—	—	—
2010–11	Worcester Sharks	AHL	73	12	23	35	46	—	—	—	—	—
2011–12	Worcester Sharks	AHL	32	5	19	24	7	—	—	—	—	—
2011–12	San Antonio Rampage	AHL	29	1	9	10	9	3	0	0	0	0
2012–13	Lake Erie Monsters	AHL	34	1	6	7	13	—	—	—	—	—
2013–14	Modo Hockey	SHL	10	0	0	0	2	—	—	—	—	—
2013–14	Straubing Tigers	DEL	40	4	23	27	26	—	—	—	—	—
2014–15	Iserlohn Roosters	DEL	44	4	24	28	8	7	4	3	7	4
2015–16	Hamburg Freezers	DEL	50	5	5	10	49	—	—	—	—	—
2016–17	Straubing Tigers	DEL	42	2	19	21	10	2	2	0	2	0
2017–18	ERC Ingolstadt	DEL	52	3	21	24	4	1	0	0	0	0
2018–19	ERC Ingolstadt	DEL	41	6	5	11	4	7	0	1	1	14
2019–20	ERC Ingolstadt	DEL	50	2	14	16	16	—	—	—	—	—
AHL totals			350	40	124	164	144	4	0	0	0	4
DEL totals			319	26	111	137	117	17	6	4	10	18

== Awards and honors ==
Award	Year
USHS
All-League	2002, 2003
All-New England Team	2003
College
HE Best Defensive Defenseman	2007
All-Hockey East First Team	2006–07
AHCA East Second-Team All-American	2006–07

Awards and achievements
Preceded by Peter Harrold	Hockey East Best Defensive Defenseman; 2006–07	Succeeded by Joe Charlebois
