= Saint Sebastian's School =

Catholic school in Needham, Massachusetts, US

St. Sebastian's School

Location
- 1191 Greendale Avenue; Needham, (Norfolk County), Massachusetts 02492-4699; United States; 42°16′10″N 71°12′25″W

Information
- Type: Private
- Motto: Semen est sanguis Christianorum (The blood of Christians [i.e., martyrs] is the seed [of faith])
- Religious affiliation: Roman Catholic
- Established: 1941
- Founder: William Cardinal O'Connell
- Head of School: Brendan Sullivan
- Chaplain: Christopher Boyle
- Faculty: 65
- Grades: 7–12
- Gender: Boys
- Average class size: 10
- Student to teacher ratio: 7:1
- Campus: Suburban
- Campus size: 26 acres (110,000 m^{2})
- Colors: Red and Black
- Athletics conference: Independent School League
- Team name: Arrows
- Rival: Belmont Hill
- Accreditation: NEASC
- Publication: The Quiver (literary magazine)
- Newspaper: The Walrus; The Dart; The Athlete
- Yearbook: The Arrow
- Website: stsebs.org

Saint Sebastian's School is an independent, all-boys Catholic secondary day school located in Needham, Massachusetts. The school enrolls around 380 boys in grades 7–12.

St. Sebastian's is the only Catholic school in the Independent School League. Its athletic teams have produced a number of professional athletes. The ice hockey team has produced 6 NHL first-round draft picks and 31 draft picks in total.

== History ==
St. Sebastian's was founded in 1941 as St. Sebastian's Country Day School by William Henry Cardinal O'Connell, who served as Archbishop of Boston from 1907 to 1944. O'Connell's policy was to encourage the establishment of Catholic private schools outside the parochial system. He purchased the old Newton, Massachusetts campus of the Country Day School of Boston, which had merged with The Rivers School the previous year. The school opened with 21 ninth-graders and six teachers, all of whom were Catholic priests, and charged $350 a year in tuition ($7,239 in March 2024 dollars). The first students graduated in 1945.

Although St. Sebastian's is not a parochial school, it is a Catholic school, and the Archbishop of Boston (Richard Henning) chairs its board of trustees. The foundation of the school reflected the increasing affluence of Boston's Irish Catholic community. One alumnus from the 1950s said that the school provided "a regimen of tough academics, fierce sports teams, and a cadre of Catholic Irish city kids mixed with new after-the-war Irish suburbanite kids." Today, the school states that it accepts both Catholic and non-Catholic students, but that "the majority of students come from the Catholic faith." The Archdiocese of Boston lists the school as a "related organization," meaning that the Archdiocese either sponsors the school or has the right to elect or appoint school officers and/or members of the board of trustees.

In 1982, the school moved to its current 26-acre campus in Needham. It currently educates boys from 68 towns in Massachusetts. St. Sebastian's claims a student-teacher ratio of 7:1, with an average class size of 10.

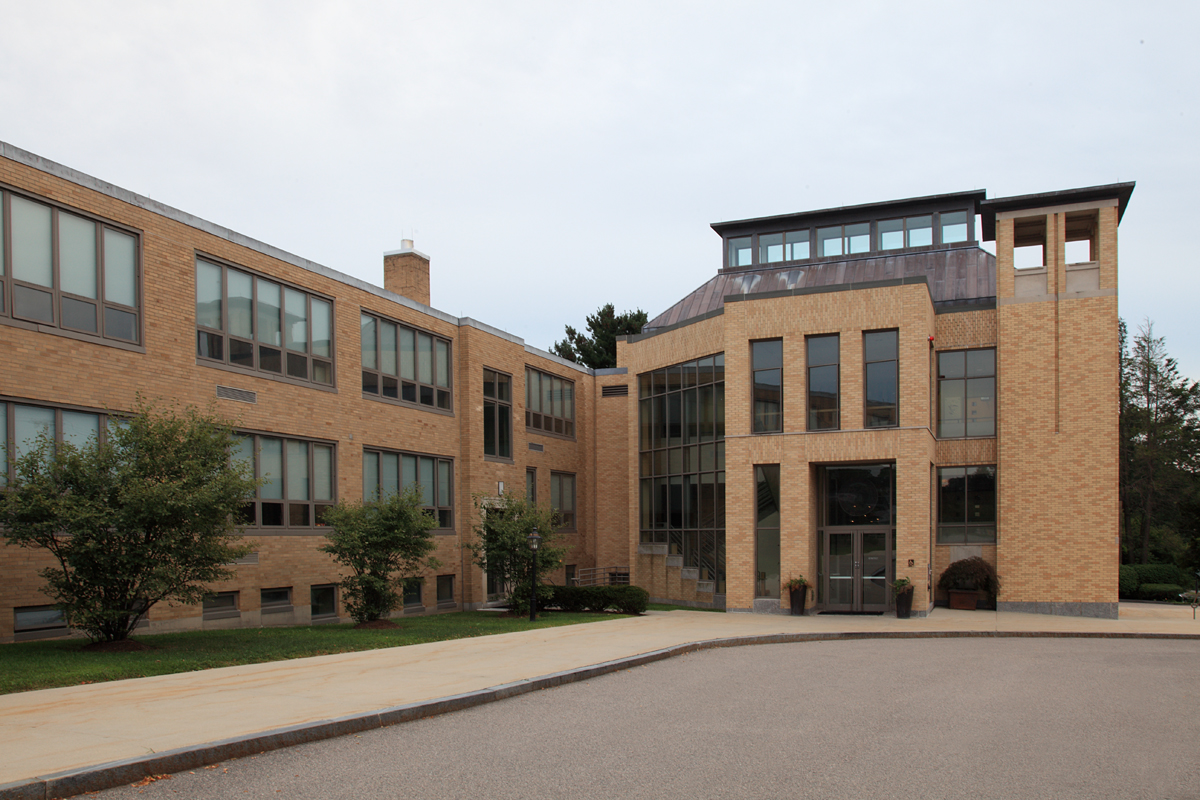
Birmingham Academic Building. St. Sebastian's Chapel is on the right.

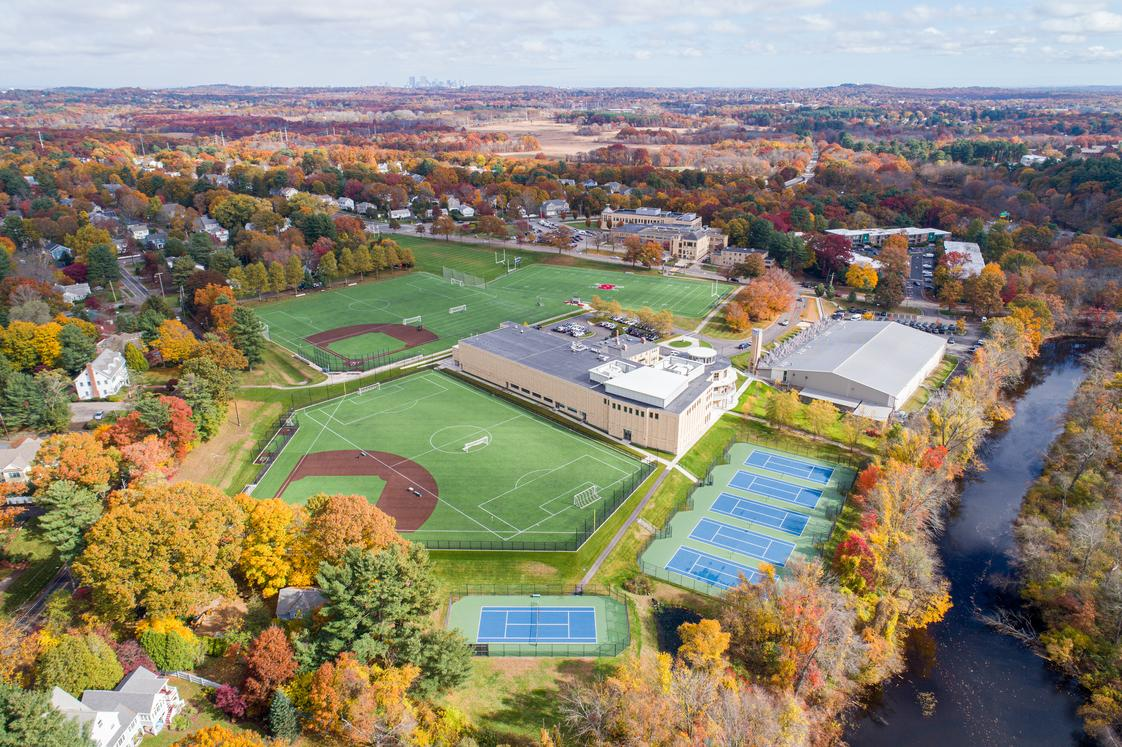
Campus and playing fields

== Tuition ==
=== Tuition and financial aid ===
In the 2023–24 school year, St. Sebastian's charged students $58,200. 30% of the student body is on financial aid.

The school's policy is to meet 100% of an admitted student's demonstrated financial need. Based on the school's $4.5 million financial aid budget, the average aid grant is roughly $39,500, or 68% of tuition.

=== Endowment and expenses ===
St. Sebastian's does not file publicly accessible Internal Revenue Service disclosures. Its financial endowment is separately incorporated. In its IRS filings for the 2022–23 school year, the St. Sebastian's endowment reported total assets of $88.1 million and net assets of $74.9 million.

In 2023, a consulting firm retained by the school disclosed that St. Sebastian's annual operating budget was $21.5 million.

== Athletics ==
St. Sebastian's offers 13 sports. Its teams, nicknamed the Arrows, compete in the Independent School League, a group of day and boarding schools in Greater Boston. St. Sebastian's is the only Catholic school in the ISL, and is not a member of the Massachusetts Catholic Conference; its student body is roughly half the size of most Catholic Conference boys' schools. In 2022, St. Sebastian's hired away Jon Bartlett, who had served as the athletic director at Boston College High School for the previous 21 years.

The school's athletic facilities include a hockey rink, two basketball courts, six squash courts, six tennis courts, a two-mat wrestling room, artificial turf fields for football, lacrosse, soccer, and baseball, and one grass multi-sport field.

The ice hockey team has produced 30 NHL draft picks, including first-rounders Joe Hulbig (1992, 13th overall), Rick DiPietro (2000, 1st overall), Mike Morris (2002, 27th overall), Brian Boyle (2003, 26th overall), Noah Hanifin (2015, 5th overall), and Will Smith (2023, 4th overall).

=== Sports and achievements ===
Team	Term	Championships	Source
Football	Fall	9 ISL	
Soccer	Fall		
Cross country	Fall	1 ISL 1 NEPSAC	
Ice hockey	Winter	2 New England; 5 ISL	
Basketball	Winter	7 New England; 4 ISL	
Wrestling	Winter		
Squash	Winter		
Skiing (Alpine)	Winter	3 New England (1 Class B, 2 Class C)	
Baseball	Spring	6 ISL	
Lacrosse	Spring	3 ISL	
Tennis	Spring		
Golf	Spring	4 ISL	
Ultimate frisbee	Spring		

== Notable alumni ==
=== Government ===
- William B. Evans, former Commissioner of the Boston Police Department
- Paul G. Kirk, U.S. Senator and Chairman of the Democratic National Committee
- Kevin E. Moley, U.S. Permanent Representative to the United Nations in Geneva
- James H. Maloney, U.S. Congressman

=== Business ===
- Brian P. Burns, entrepreneur, attorney, and philanthropist
- Keith Barr, CEO of CarMax

=== Media ===
- Bob Arnot, physician and television personality
- Lawrence O'Donnell, writer/producer, notably The Last Word with Lawrence O'Donnell and The West Wing
- John Slattery, actor

=== Sports ===
- AJ Dybantsa (basketball)
- Albie O'Connell (ice hockey)
- Brian Boyle (ice hockey)
- Carl Corazzini (ice hockey)
- Chris Kelleher (ice hockey)
- Connor Strachan (football)
- Danny O'Regan (ice hockey)
- Drew Commesso (ice hockey)
- Grady O'Malley (basketball)
- Jayden Struble (ice hockey)
- Joe Hulbig (ice hockey)
- Kevin Regan (ice hockey)
- Matt Duffy (baseball)
- Mike Grier (ice hockey)
- Mike Morris (ice hockey)
- Mike Morrison (ice hockey)
- Mike Pandolfo (ice hockey)
- Mike Smith (baseball)
- Mike Walsh (ice hockey)
- Noah Hanifin (ice hockey)
- Noah Welch (ice hockey)
- Richard Pitino (basketball)
- Rick DiPietro (ice hockey)
- Ryan Lannon (ice hockey)
- Sean Sullivan (ice hockey)
- Tony Barros (basketball)
- Will Smith (ice hockey)

== In popular culture ==
- In the TV show Gilmore Girls, Christopher Hayden (David Sutcliffe) claims to have been kicked out of St. Sebastian's. Logan Huntzberger (Matt Czuchry) responds "I know several people who got kicked out of St. Sebastian's. My good friend Colin was actually banned from coming anywhere within a 10-mile radius."
