= Mike Morris (ice hockey) =

American ice hockey player (born 1983)

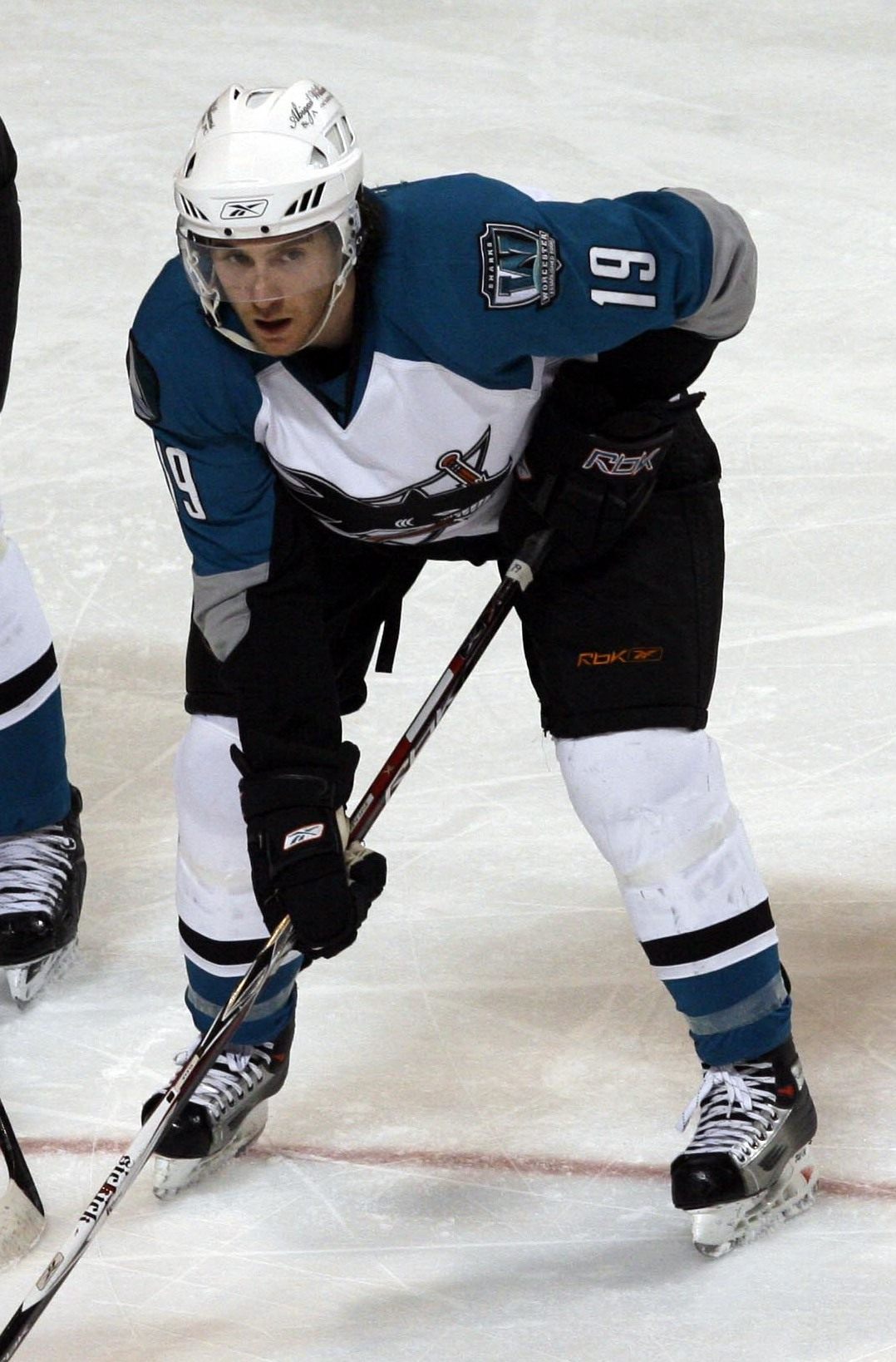
- Morris with the Worcester Sharks in 2007
- Born: July 14, 1983 (age 42) Braintree, Massachusetts, United States
- Height: 6 ft 0 in (183 cm)
- Weight: 180 lb (82 kg; 12 st 12 lb)
- Position: Forward
- Played for: Worcester Sharks
- NHL draft: 27th overall, 2002; San Jose Sharks
- Playing career: 2007–2009

Mike Morris (born July 14, 1983) is an American former professional ice hockey forward. He was drafted in the first round, twenty-seventh overall, of the 2002 NHL entry draft by the San Jose Sharks, one of two NHL first round draft choices in history to attend Northeastern University (the other being Jamie Oleksiak).

== Career ==
Morris was a star player at national prep hockey powerhouse St. Sebastian's, Needham, Massachusetts, where he played and won the ISL Championship and the New England Prep school championship. Overlooked because of his size by many of the top college programs, Mike stayed local to play in Hockey East on a full scholarship to Northeastern University in Boston, where he played forward.

Finishing second in team scoring in the 2004–05 season to Hobey Baker finalist Jason Guerriero, Morris suffered a major concussion at year's end and sat out the 2005–06 season (which would have been his senior year). He eventually received a medical red shirt exception to play in 2006–07. Morris returned as co-captain for that season, in which he played in only 20 games due to ongoing injuries, but finished third on the team in points with 18.

Morris spent the 2007–08 campaign playing for the Worcester Sharks (AHL), where he played in nine games, scoring two points. He played in another 17 games for Worcester in the 2008–09 season, scoring eleven points, after which he suffered another concussion that ended his season. He was medically released from his contract, and per doctor's orders, retired from professional hockey.

== Awards and honors ==
| Award | Year |
|---|---|
| All-Hockey East Rookie Team | 2002–03 |
| All-Hockey East Second Team | 2004–05 |

== Career statistics ==
| | | | Regular season | | | | | Playoffs |
| Season | Team | League | GP | G | A | Pts | PIM | GP | G | A | Pts | PIM |
|---|---|---|---|---|---|---|---|---|---|---|---|---|
| 2000–01 | Saint Sebastian's School | HS-Prep | 28 | 20 | 28 | 48 | 18 | — | — | — | — | — |
| 2001–02 | Saint Sebastian's School | HS-Prep | 31 | 29 | 29 | 58 | 26 | — | — | — | — | — |
| 2002–03 | Northeastern University | HE | 26 | 9 | 12 | 21 | 16 | — | — | — | — | — |
| 2003–04 | Northeastern University | HE | 34 | 10 | 20 | 30 | 14 | — | — | — | — | — |
| 2004–05 | Northeastern University | HE | 34 | 19 | 20 | 39 | 24 | — | — | — | — | — |
| 2006–07 | Northeastern University | HE | 20 | 7 | 11 | 18 | 22 | — | — | — | — | — |
| 2007–08 | Worcester Sharks | AHL | 9 | 1 | 1 | 2 | 2 | — | — | — | — | — |
| 2008–09 | Worcester Sharks | AHL | 17 | 5 | 6 | 11 | 6 | — | — | — | — | — |
| HE totals | | | 114 | 45 | 63 | 108 | 76 | — | — | — | — | — |
| AHL totals | | | 26 | 6 | 7 | 13 | 8 | — | — | — | — | — |

Sporting positions
| Preceded by Marcel Goc | San Jose Sharks first-round draft pick 2002 | Succeeded by Milan Michalek |
