= Noah Hanifin =

American ice hockey player (born 1997)

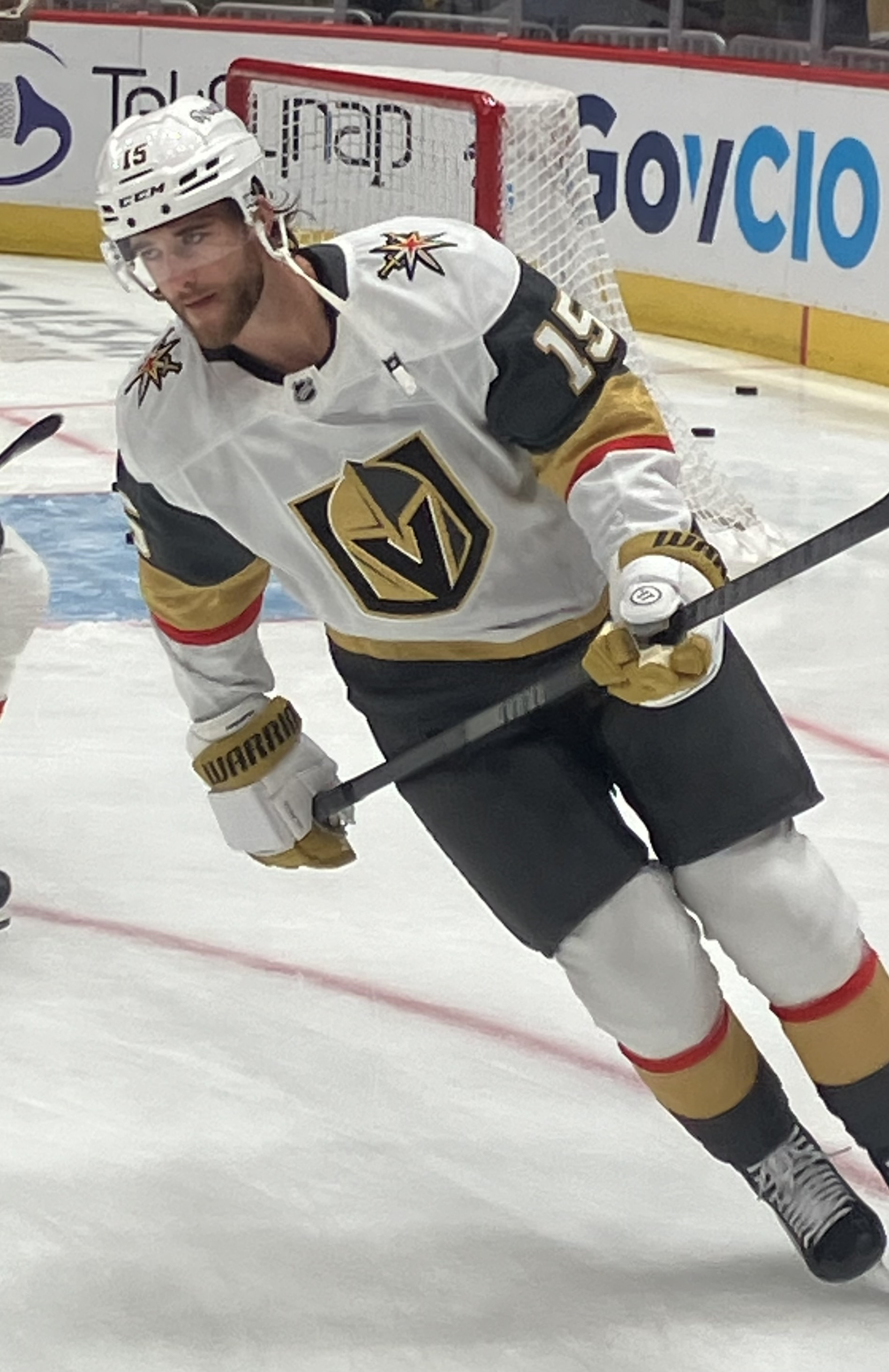
- Hanifin with the Vegas Golden Knights in 2026
- Born: January 25, 1997 (age 29) Boston, Massachusetts, U.S.
- Height: 6 ft 3 in (191 cm)
- Weight: 206 lb (93 kg; 14 st 10 lb)
- Position: Defense
- Shoots: Left
- NHL team Former teams: Vegas Golden Knights; Carolina Hurricanes; Calgary Flames
- National team: United States
- NHL draft: 5th overall, 2015; Carolina Hurricanes
- Playing career: 2015–present

Noah Hanifin (born January 25, 1997) is an American professional ice hockey player who is a defenseman for the Vegas Golden Knights of the National Hockey League (NHL). He has previously played for the Carolina Hurricanes, who drafted him fifth overall in the 2015 NHL entry draft, and the Calgary Flames.

== Early life ==
Born in Boston on January 25, 1997, to Bob, a court officer, and Tina Hanifin. Hanifin grew up in Norwood, Massachusetts, with two younger siblings – Cole and Lily. His father was diagnosed with colon and kidney cancer when Hanifin was 13. Growing up, he attended Saint Sebastian's School, where he played for the varsity team in the eighth grade.

== Playing career ==
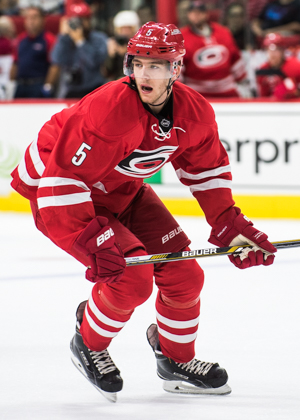
Hanifin with the Hurricanes in 2015

=== Amateur ===
Hanifin was projected to be a top-three pick for the 2015 NHL entry draft, and the number-one-rated defenseman. He was picked fifth overall by the Carolina Hurricanes. Hanifin played for the USA Hockey's U17 program based out of Ann Arbor, Michigan, but was added to the U18 national team as an underage player, helping to lead Team USA to the gold medal at the 2014 IIHF World U18 Championships. He was the highest-scoring American defenseman of the tournament with one goal and five points. After fast-tracking his high school graduation, Hanifin matriculated at Boston College as a 17-year-old, playing for the Eagles and becoming the second-youngest player in the team's history.

=== Professional ===
==== Carolina Hurricanes ====
Hanifin was selected fifth overall by the Carolina Hurricanes in the 2015 NHL entry draft. On July 11, 2015, Hanifin signed a three-year, entry-level contract with the Hurricanes forgoing the remainder of his college eligibility. He made his NHL debut October 8, 2015, against the Nashville Predators. Hanifin scored his first NHL goal against Anton Khudobin of the Anaheim Ducks on November 16, 2015. Hanifin finished his rookie season with 4 goals and 22 points in 79 games.

On January 15, 2018, Hanifin was selected as the sole representative of the Hurricanes at the 2018 NHL All-Star Game. On March 19, 2018, Hanifin was diagnosed with a concussion and was ruled out indefinitely. After missing just three games, Hanifin returned to the Hurricanes' lineup on March 24 in a 5–2 win over the Ottawa Senators. Hanifin scored what ended up being the game-winning goal. Despite the Hurricanes not qualifying for the 2018 Stanley Cup playoffs, Hanifin ended the regular season with a career-high 10 goals and 32 points.

==== Calgary Flames ====
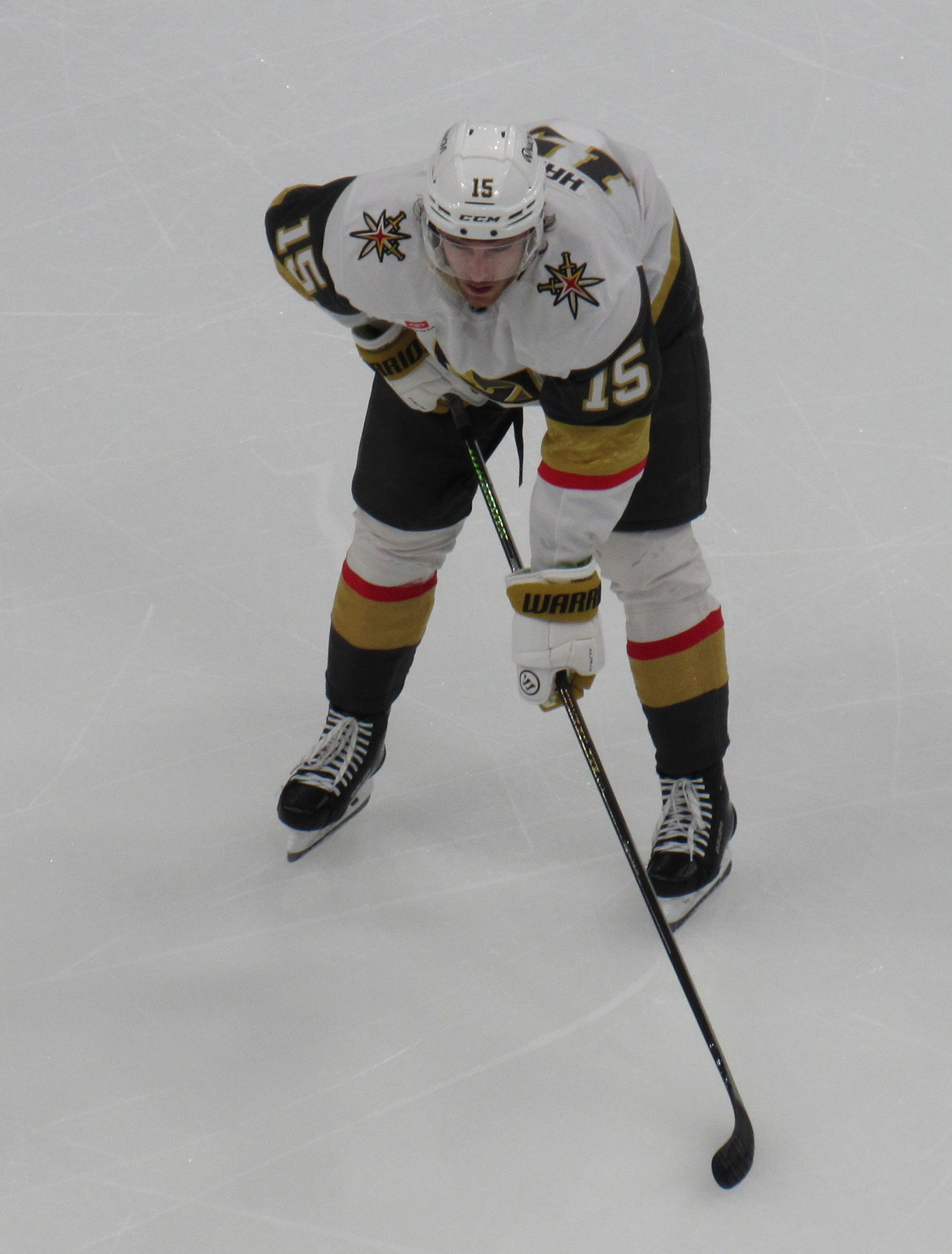
Hanifin with the Golden Knights in 2026

On June 23, 2018, Hanifin was traded to the Calgary Flames (along with teammate Elias Lindholm) in exchange for Dougie Hamilton, Micheal Ferland, and prospect Adam Fox. On August 30, the Flames signed Hanifin to a six-year, $29.7 million contract extension worth $4.95 million annually.

On February 6, 2021, in a regular-season game against the Edmonton Oilers, Hanifin became the sixth-youngest U.S.-born player to reach the milestone of 400 NHL games played. Calgary defeated Edmonton 6–4.

==== Vegas Golden Knights ====
On March 6, 2024, Hanifin was traded in a three-team deal to the Vegas Golden Knights in exchange for Daniil Miromanov, a first-round draft pick, and a conditional third-round draft pick, while the Philadelphia Flyers received a fifth-round pick from Vegas for retaining half of Hanifin's salary. Hanifin later signed an eight-year, $58.8 million extension with Vegas on April 11, 2024.

== International play ==
Medal record

Men's ice hockey

Representing the United States

Olympic Games
Gold medal – first place	2026 Milano Cortina	

Hanifin has represented the United States internationally at the 2014 U17 World Hockey Challenge, 2014 U18 World Championships, the 2015 World Junior Championships, the 2015 World Championship, and the 2017 World Championship.

On January 2, 2026, he was named to United States' roster for the 2026 Winter Olympics.

== Personal life ==
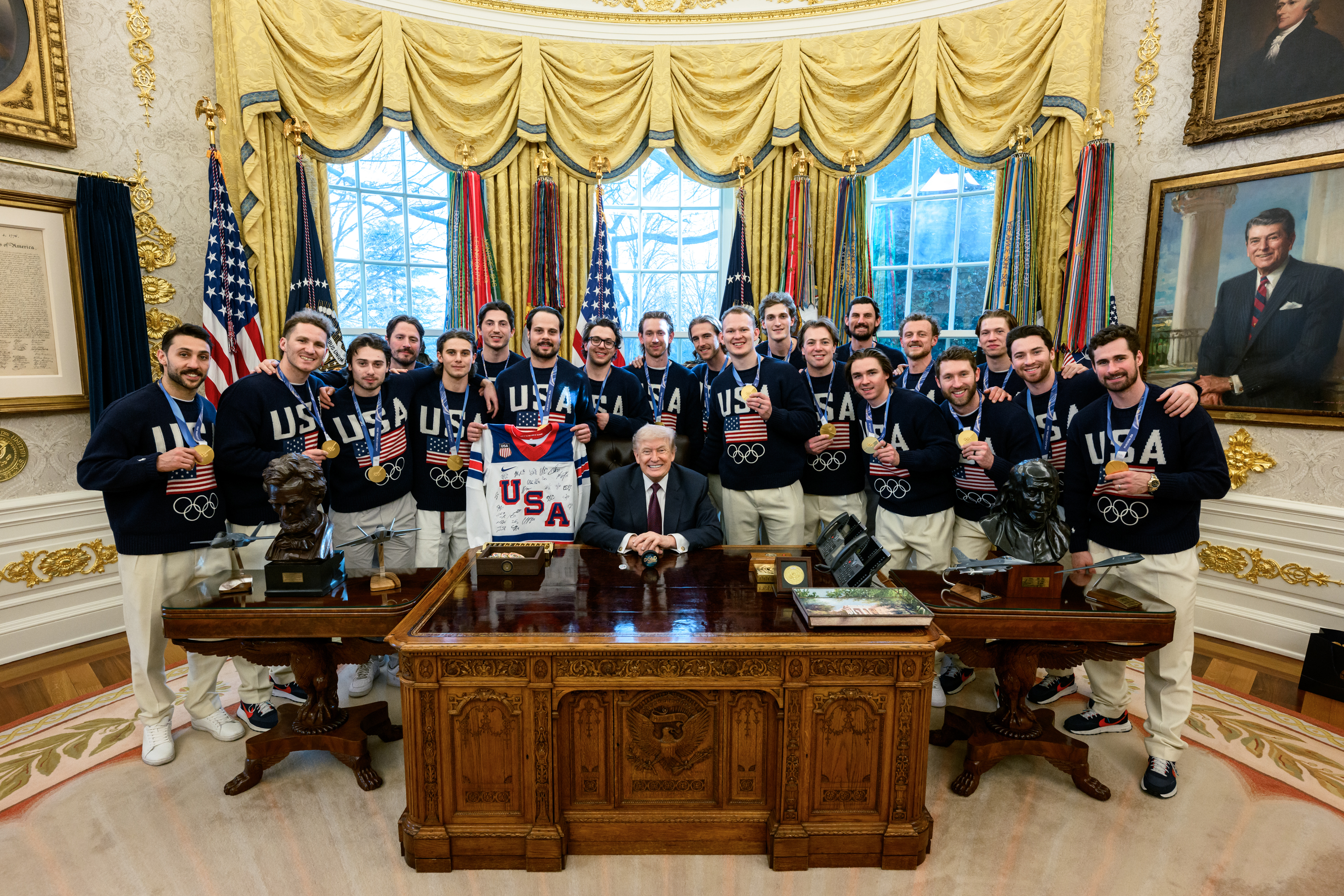
Hanifin posing with President Trump and teammates during visit to the White House in February 2026

Hanifin and his wife Monique were married in August 2024. They have lived in Las Vegas since Hanifin was traded to the Golden Knights.

Amid backlash faced by the men's Olympic hockey team regarding the inclusion of FBI director Kash Patel during their gold medal celebrations and members of the team laughing at President Trump's comments of being impeached if he did not invite the women's team to the White House, the team was invited to meet with the president and attend the State of the Union. Hanifin was among the majority who visited with the president and attended the State of the Union.

== Career statistics ==
=== Regular season and playoffs ===
			Regular season					Playoffs
Season	Team	League	GP	G	A	Pts	PIM	GP	G	A	Pts	PIM
2010–11	Saint Sebastian's School	USHS	27	2	9	11	—	—	—	—	—	—
2011–12	Saint Sebastian's School	USHS	28	5	24	29	—	—	—	—	—	—
2012–13	Saint Sebastian's School	USHS	28	10	24	34	—	—	—	—	—	—
2013–14	U.S. NTDP Juniors	USHL	31	6	14	20	18	—	—	—	—	—
2013–14	U.S. NTDP U17	USDP	45	8	24	32	34	—	—	—	—	—
2013–14	U.S. NTDP U18	USDP	14	2	11	13	4	—	—	—	—	—
2014–15	Boston College	HE	37	5	18	23	16	—	—	—	—	—
2015–16	Carolina Hurricanes	NHL	79	4	18	22	22	—	—	—	—	—
2016–17	Carolina Hurricanes	NHL	81	4	25	29	26	—	—	—	—	—
2017–18	Carolina Hurricanes	NHL	79	10	22	32	21	—	—	—	—	—
2018–19	Calgary Flames	NHL	80	5	28	33	12	5	0	1	1	4
2019–20	Calgary Flames	NHL	70	5	17	22	12	10	0	4	4	0
2020–21	Calgary Flames	NHL	47	4	11	15	18	—	—	—	—	—
2021–22	Calgary Flames	NHL	81	10	38	48	19	12	0	3	3	4
2022–23	Calgary Flames	NHL	81	7	31	38	33	—	—	—	—	—
2023–24	Calgary Flames	NHL	61	11	24	35	22	—	—	—	—	—
2023–24	Vegas Golden Knights	NHL	19	2	10	12	2	7	2	3	5	0
2024–25	Vegas Golden Knights	NHL	80	10	29	39	14	11	1	4	5	2
2025–26	Vegas Golden Knights	NHL	71	3	25	28	14	22	0	7	7	2
NHL totals			829	75	278	353	215	67	3	22	25	12

=== International ===
Year	Team	Event	Result	GP	G	A	Pts	PIM
2014	United States	U17	1st place, gold medalist(s)	6	1	2	3	10
2014	United States	WJC18	1st place, gold medalist(s)	7	1	4	5	4
2015	United States	WJC	5th	5	0	2	2	0
2016	United States	WC	4th	10	1	2	3	4
2017	United States	WC	5th	8	0	2	2	2
2019	United States	WC	7th	8	1	3	4	0
2025	United States	4NF	2nd	4	0	0	0	4
2026	United States	OG	1st place, gold medalist(s)	6	1	2	3	0
Junior totals				18	2	8	10	14
Senior totals				36	3	9	12	10

== Awards and honors ==
Award	Year	Ref
College
Hockey East All-Rookie Team	2015	
Hockey East Second Team All-Star	2015	
New England All-Star	2015	
NHL
NHL All-Star Game	2018	
Calgary Flames
Ralph T. Scurfield Humanitarian Award	2022	

Awards and achievements
Preceded by Haydn Fleury	Carolina Hurricanes first-round draft pick 2015	Succeeded by Jake Bean
