= Danny O'Regan =

American ice hockey player (born 1994)

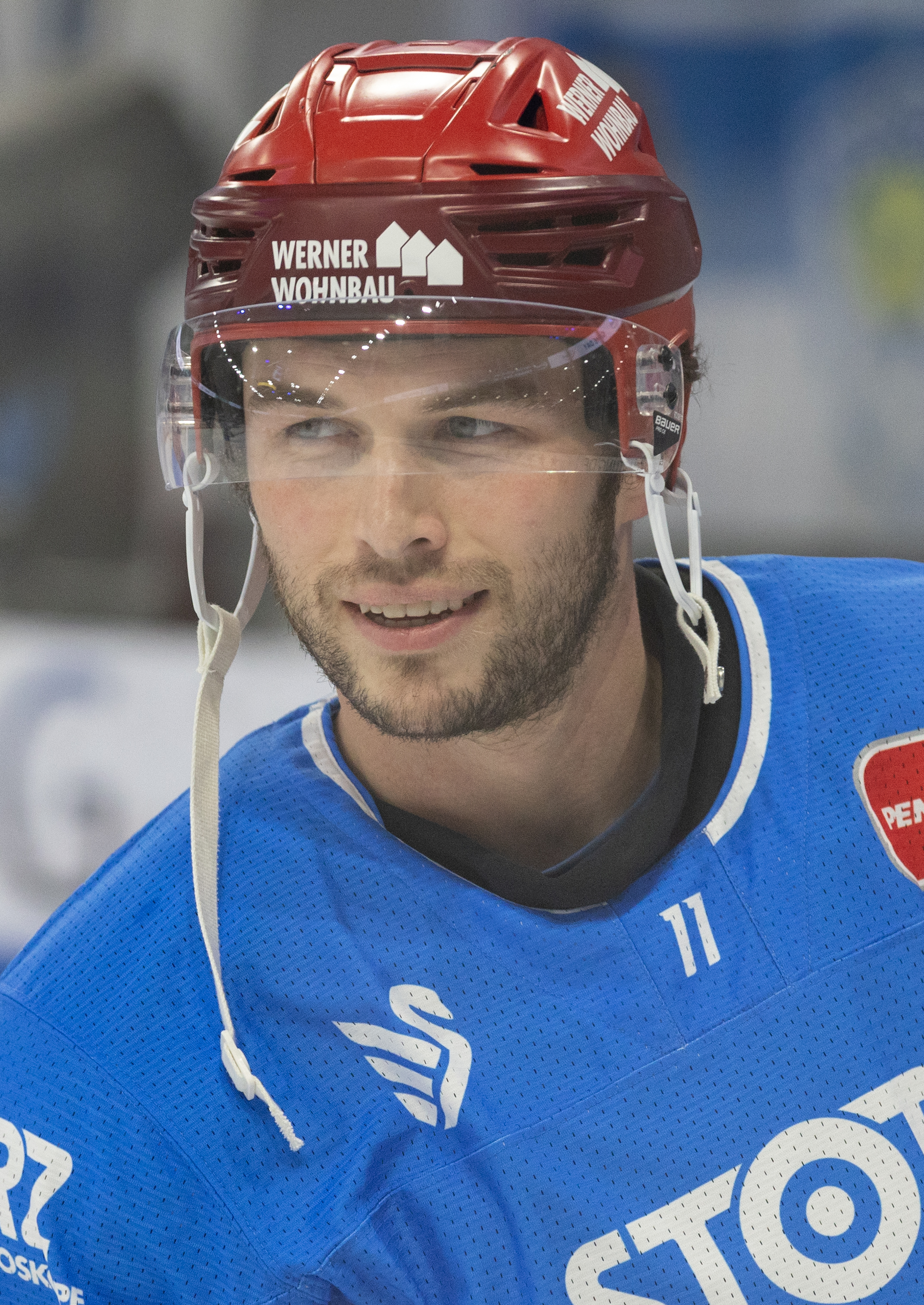
- O'Regan with the Schwenninger Wild Wings in 2025
- Born: January 30, 1994 (age 32) Berlin, Germany
- Height: 5 ft 10 in (178 cm)
- Weight: 185 lb (84 kg; 13 st 3 lb)
- Position: Center
- Shoots: Right
- DEL team Former teams: Schwenninger Wild Wings; San Jose Sharks; Buffalo Sabres; Anaheim Ducks; MoDo Hockey; Kunlun Red Star
- NHL draft: 138th overall, 2012; San Jose Sharks
- Playing career: 2016–present

Daniel O'Regan (born January 30, 1994) is an American professional ice hockey forward who plays for the Schwenninger Wild Wings of the Deutsche Eishockey Liga (DEL). O'Regan was drafted in the fifth round, 138th overall, by the San Jose Sharks in the 2012 NHL entry draft. He is the son of former professional ice hockey player Tom O'Regan.

== Playing career ==
O’Regan spent parts of his childhood in Germany, where he started skating. After his father had retired from professional ice hockey, the family returned to the United States, settling in Needham, Massachusetts.

He attended Roxbury Latin School in West Roxbury, Massachusetts, before transferring to St. Sebastian's School in Needham, Massachusetts, after his sophomore year. He attended the USA Hockey's National Team Development Program and subsequently enrolled at Boston University in 2012, leading the Terriers in points as a freshman, while making the Hockey East All-Rookie Team. He received Hockey East Second Team honors as a junior, helping BU win the Hockey East championship and was named to the All-Regional Team (NCAA Tournament). An assistant captain his senior year, he was named a Hockey East First Team All-Star. O’Regan played 154 games wearing a Terriers' uniform, tallying 66 goals and 88 assists to become the first BU player to pass the 150-point mark since 1998.

In April 2016, he signed a two-year entry-level contract with the San Jose Sharks of the National Hockey League (NHL). He was initially assigned to AHL affiliate, the San Jose Barracuda to begin the 2016–17 season. On November 21, 2016, O'Regan was recalled from the Barracuda by the San Jose Sharks to make his NHL debut against the New Jersey Devils. He was scoreless as the Sharks were victorious in a 4–0 shutout effort. O'Regan was soon returned to the Barracuda and continued to lead the club in scoring in his first professional season. In 63 regular season games, O'Regan compiled a league best 58 points as a rookie, helping the Barracuda to their first pacific division title. He added 7 points in 15 post-season games before suffering defeat in the Western Conference finals to the Grand Rapids Griffins. O'Regan was awarded as the AHL's Rookie of the Year and earned a selection to the AHL All-Rookie Team.

During the 2017–18 season, on February 26, 2018, the Sharks traded O'Regan along with a conditional first-round and fourth-round pick in the 2019 NHL entry draft to the Buffalo Sabres in exchange for Evander Kane. He was called up by Buffalo for the first time on March 7, 2018, reuniting O'Regan with his two linemates from Boston University, Jack Eichel and Evan Rodrigues.

On July 1, 2019, O'Regan signed a one-year, two-way contract with the New York Rangers. O'Regan was assigned to the Rangers' AHL affiliate, the Hartford Wolf Pack, for the duration of the 2019–20 season, where he placed second on the club in scoring with 38 points through 62 games before the season was cancelled due to the COVID-19 pandemic.

On October 11, 2020, O'Regan signed a one-year, two-way contract with the Vegas Golden Knights. In the pandemic delayed 2020–21 season, O'Regan was assigned by the Golden Knights to join AHL affiliate, the Henderson Silver Knights, for their inaugural season. He led the team in scoring with a point-per-game pace of 16 goals and 21 assists in 37 games.

On July 29, 2021, O'Regan signed a two-year, two-way contract with the Anaheim Ducks. On December 19, 2022, the Ducks traded O'Regan to the Detroit Red Wings in exchange for Michael Del Zotto. Prior to being traded, he recorded three goals and 15 assists in 27 games for the San Diego Gulls during the 2022–23 season.

At the conclusion of his contract with the Red Wings, O'Regan left the club as a free agent in the summer. On September 20, 2023, O'Regan opted to pursue a European career by agreeing to a one-year contract with Swedish club, MoDo Hockey of the Swedish Hockey League (SHL).

At the end of his tenure with MoDo, O'Regan continued his career abroad in agreeing to a one-year contract with Chinese based Kunlun Red Star of the KHL on July 28, 2024.

== International play ==
Representing the United States, O'Regan won gold at the 2012 U18 World Championships and also played at the 2014 U20 World Championships.

== Personal ==
O'Regan was born in Berlin, Germany, where his father Tom, a former Boston University team captain, played professionally for Berliner SC Preussen at the time. His older brother Tommy previously played ice hockey at Harvard University.

== Career statistics ==
=== Regular season and playoffs ===
			Regular season					Playoffs
Season	Team	League	GP	G	A	Pts	PIM	GP	G	A	Pts	PIM
2010–11	Saint Sebastian's School	USHS	27	25	25	50	10	—	—	—	—	—
2011–12	Saint Sebastian's School	USHS	26	20	34	54	12	—	—	—	—	—
2011–12	U.S. National Development Team	USHL	7	3	2	5	0	—	—	—	—	—
2012–13	Boston University	HE	39	16	22	38	16	—	—	—	—	—
2013–14	Boston University	HE	35	10	12	22	14	—	—	—	—	—
2014–15	Boston University	HE	41	23	27	50	26	—	—	—	—	—
2015–16	Boston University	HE	39	17	27	44	16	—	—	—	—	—
2016–17	San Jose Barracuda	AHL	63	23	35	58	10	15	4	3	7	6
2016–17	San Jose Sharks	NHL	3	1	0	1	0	—	—	—	—	—
2017–18	San Jose Barracuda	AHL	31	7	18	25	12	—	—	—	—	—
2017–18	San Jose Sharks	NHL	19	0	4	4	2	—	—	—	—	—
2017–18	Rochester Americans	AHL	18	6	9	15	4	3	1	1	2	0
2017–18	Buffalo Sabres	NHL	2	0	0	0	0	—	—	—	—	—
2018–19	Rochester Americans	AHL	70	20	28	48	42	3	0	0	0	2
2018–19	Buffalo Sabres	NHL	1	0	0	0	0	—	—	—	—	—
2019–20	Hartford Wolf Pack	AHL	62	11	27	38	24	—	—	—	—	—
2020–21	Henderson Silver Knights	AHL	37	16	21	37	4	5	3	3	6	2
2021–22	San Diego Gulls	AHL	53	13	21	34	20	2	0	1	1	2
2021–22	Anaheim Ducks	NHL	5	0	1	1	0	—	—	—	—	—
2022–23	San Diego Gulls	AHL	27	3	15	18	8	—	—	—	—	—
2022–23	Grand Rapids Griffins	AHL	39	14	17	31	8	—	—	—	—	—
2023–24	MoDo Hockey	SHL	34	4	8	12	2	—	—	—	—	—
2024–25	Kunlun Red Star	KHL	65	11	16	27	20	—	—	—	—	—
NHL totals			30	1	5	6	2	—	—	—	—	—

=== International ===
Year	Team	Event	Result	GP	G	A	Pts	PIM
2011	United States	IH18	5th	4	2	3	5	2
2012	United States	U18	1st place, gold medalist(s)	6	1	3	4	0
2014	United States	WJC	5th	4	1	0	1	4
Junior totals				14	4	6	10	6

== Awards and honors ==
Award	Year
College
HE All-Rookie Team	2013
HE Second All-Star Team	2015
HE First All-Star Team	2016
East Second All-American Team	2016
New England D1 All-Stars	2016
AHL
All-Star Game	2017
All-Rookie Team	2017
Dudley "Red" Garrett Memorial Award	2017
