= Melissa Stark =

American sportscaster (born 1973)

- Born: Melissa Zoey Stark; November 11, 1973 (age 52); Baltimore, Maryland, U.S.
- Education: University of Virginia
- Occupations: NFL Network reporter NBC Sunday Night Football sideline reporter
- Employer: NBC Sports
- Spouse: Mike Lilley
- Children: 4

Melissa Zoey Stark (born November 11, 1973) is an American television personality and sportscaster, best known as the current sideline reporter for NBC Sunday Night Football and the former sideline reporter for Monday Night Football.

Formerly a reporter for the NFL Network, she spent five seasons as host of NFL 360. She previously worked with NBC, primarily at its MSNBC subsidiary and as a correspondent for NBC's The Today Show. In the summer of 2008, she anchored MSNBC's coverage of the 2008 Beijing Olympics. Prior to NBC, she was a reporter for ESPN.

Stark has been described as a "trailblazer" who led to increased opportunities for women in sportscasting, which had fewer women broadcasters at the beginning of her career.

== Early life and education ==
Stark was born in Baltimore, Maryland, the daughter of Walter Stark, an eye surgeon at the Wilmer Eye Clinic at the Johns Hopkins Hospital in Baltimore. Her interest in sports began during her childhood in Baltimore, when she attended Baltimore Colts games with her father, who treated players for eye injuries. She graduated from the Roland Park Country School, a women's prep school in Baltimore, where she was class valedictorian.

Stark graduated magna cum laude from the University of Virginia with a degree in foreign affairs and Spanish. She was a member of the Kappa Alpha Theta sorority.

== Career ==
In 1991, she became a news intern on the assignment desk at WMAR-TV in Baltimore. Stark was a news intern for the CBS Evening News with Dan Rather in 1993 and 1994 where she wrote scripts and assembled background information on investigative pieces for health correspondent Bob Arnot.

From 1994 to 1995, Stark was a production assistant and reporter with Virginia Sports Marketing in Charlottesville for the University of Virginia's Coach's TV Show, with George Welsh and Jeff Jones. The series aired in all major markets in Virginia.

=== ESPN ===
Stark joined ESPN in 1996 as the host of the weekly program Scholastic Sports America, where she traveled across the United States covering high school and college sports focusing on human interest and issue-related stories.

From 1996 to 2003, Stark reported for ESPN's SportsCenter, where she served as a regular contributor to Sunday NFL Countdown and the Emmy Award-winning show, Outside the Lines. Stark was also the SportsCenter on-site host for the NBA Finals and World Series, and covered national stories including Major League Baseball, National Hockey League, golf, and NCAA basketball for the network.

=== ABC Sports ===
Stark joined ABC Sports in June 2000. She was the lead sideline reporter for ABC Sports' Monday Night Football for three seasons, from 2000–2003, which included ABC's coverage of Super Bowl XXXVII in San Diego. Stark also served as a reporter for ABC Sports' coverage of figure skating, the NFL Pro Bowl, and celebrity golf events.

In addition to her sportscasting career, Stark has appeared as a guest host on The View and was the co-host of ABC Entertainment's 2001 pilot presentation of The Runner, a prime-time reality-based program conceived by Matt Damon and Ben Affleck.

=== NBC News and Sports ===
In July 2003, Stark joined NBC News as a National Correspondent for The Today Show and would also anchor MSNBC Live. She covered the Opening Ceremony as well as the swimming and diving events at the 2004 Summer Olympics.

She made her NBC Sports debut in 2004 contributing reports and interviews for the network's coverage of the Triple Crown and other big horse racing events for the network.

In 2005, Stark participated as a reporter for NBC's New Year's Eve coverage, hosted by Carson Daly. She left MSNBC Live and The Today Show in November 2006.

Stark covered the Opening Ceremony and speed skating event during NBC's coverage of the 2006 Winter Olympics. She worked her third Olympic Games for NBC Sports serving as an anchor for MSNBC's coverage of the 2008 Summer Olympics.

In 2022, Stark returned to NBC as the new sideline reporter for Sunday Night Football, replacing Michele Tafoya. Stark covered the Opening Ceremony and also replaced Tafoya on swimming events for NBC's coverage of the 2024 Summer Olympics, her fourth Olympic Games and first since returning to NBC.

=== NFL Network ===
Stark has also done field work for NFL Network shows NFL Total Access and Around The League Live. She hosted the NFL Network gameday show First on the Field and the on-site pre-game show, GameDay Kickoff, later renamed GameDay First, at primetime designations along with Shaun O'Hara, Sterling Sharpe, and Brian Billick for five years beginning in 2012.

Stark was the host of the Emmy Award-winning series NFL 360. As host and reporter for NFL Network, she is most known for interviewing players on stage at the draft and hosting red carpet events for the draft and Super Bowl as well the NFL Honors.

On April 4, 2024, it was announced that NFL Network were making staff cuts and Stark along with three other NFL Network employees were being laid off from their jobs with the channel.

== Personal life ==
Stark resides in Rumson, New Jersey with her four children, two of them twin daughters, and husband, Mike Lilley.
