= Dave Rothenberg =

American radio personality

- Occupation: Sports broadcaster
- Employer: ESPN Radio
- Television: The Michael Kay Show; Fantasy Focus on ESPN Radio (simulcast)
- Website: daverothenberg.com

David Rothenberg is a sports talk radio host. Currently, he and Rick Dipietro host DiPietro and Rothenberg from 6:00 to 10:00 a.m. on ESPN New York 880.

== Career ==
In 1999, Rothenberg started running the board and providing the halftime show on high school football broadcasts on WGCH-AM 1490 in Greenwich and sister station WVIP. He was a weekly football expert on WALE-AM 990 in Providence, RI. He skipped around with stops at MLB.com, Air America, Sirius, Cablevision and NFL Network. in October 2007, he moved to Raleigh, NC to help launch 99.9 FM The Fan.

While in Raleigh, Rothenberg co-hosted The Fanatics during morning drive on 99.9 FM The Fan. Before he joined The Fanatics, the show was the lowest ranked sports talk sports talk show in its time slot; after he joined the show as a co-host, The Fanatics jumped to #1 sports talk show in the Triangle and was ranked top 10 in the market M25-54. When the station first launched in October 2007, Rothenberg was the solo host of Inside the ACC/Triangle Sports Night from 7 to 9 p.m., and was also the update anchor during The Insiders evening drive show. In addition, Rothenberg was the primary reporter on the NHL's Carolina Hurricanes' post-game show.

Rothenberg was also a fill-in host for afternoon drive on 850 AM The Buzz and the mid-day show on 620 AM The Bull in Raleigh. He was the color analyst for Campbell University football on the Campbell University Radio Network as well as the color analyst for basketball and football for The Ravenscroft School. You may have also heard Dave filling in on Sirius/XM Fantasy Sports Radio for programming provided by RotoExperts.

In 2010, "The Dave Rothenberg Show" debuted as a 3-hour weekday evening radio program on ESPN-NY.

In 2014, Rothenberg co-hosted, with SportsCenter anchor Randy Scott, Fantasy Focus on ESPN Radio, a six-hour weekly radio broadcast focusing on fantasy football and simulcast on ESPN3.

In January 2015, Rothenberg began a weekly three-hour Saturday afternoon talk program, "The Dave Rothenberg Show," which was broadcast nationally by ESPN Radio.

In September 2017, Rothenberg began co-hosting the midday show Humpty and Canty, with Rick DiPietro and Chris Canty weekdays from 10AM to 1PM. The show moved to the morning drive slot in January 2021. The show's name changed to "DiPietro, Canty and Rothenberg" or "DCR".

In September 2021, Chris Canty moved to the national afternoon drive show on ESPN Radio with Mike Golic Jr. Hence, "DiPietro, Canty and Rothenberg" became "DiPietro and Rothenberg." It airs weekdays from 6-10 a.m. on WHSQ AM (880AM ESPN NY), it is also recorded as a podcast and airs live on youtube.
