= Marcel Goc =

German ice hockey player (born 1983)

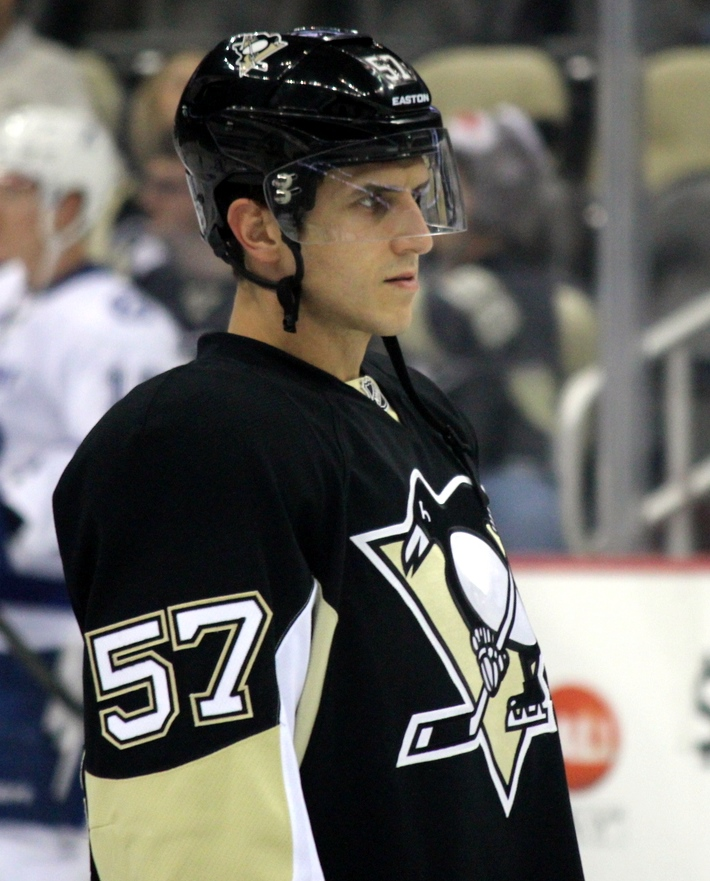
- Goc with the Pittsburgh Penguins in 2014
- Born: 24 August 1983 (age 43) Calw, West Germany
- Height: 6 ft 1 in (185 cm)
- Weight: 197 lb (89 kg; 14 st 1 lb)
- Position: Centre
- Shot: Left
- Played for: SERC Wild Wings; Adler Mannheim; San Jose Sharks; Nashville Predators; Florida Panthers; Pittsburgh Penguins; St. Louis Blues
- National team: Germany
- NHL draft: 20th overall, 2001; San Jose Sharks
- Playing career: 1999–2020

Marcel Goc (/ɡɒtʃ/; born 24 August 1983) is a German former professional ice hockey player.

Goc's father Josef played hockey in his native Czechoslovakia, he has two brothers who also play professional hockey. His older brother Sascha has played for Team Germany as well. His younger brother Nikolai also previously played for Adler Mannheim and Team Germany.

Goc saw action in 699 NHL contests, played 388 games in the DEL and won 112 caps for the German men's national team. He won a silver medal at the 2018 Olympic Games.

== Playing career ==
As a youth, Goc played in the 1996 and 1997 Quebec International Pee-Wee Hockey Tournaments with a team from Baden-Württemberg.

Goc was drafted in the first round, 20th overall by the Sharks in the 2001 NHL entry draft, though he remained in Germany until 2003. He spent all of the 2003–04 season with the Cleveland Barons, the Sharks' then minor league affiliate, but joined the Sharks during the 2004 playoffs. He holds the franchise record in Cleveland for longest assist streak (7 games).

In his first NHL game, Game 5 of the Western Conference Quarterfinals against the St. Louis Blues, Goc assisted on the series-clinching goal by deflecting the puck away from Blues goaltender Chris Osgood and right to Mark Smith. Then, in his second game, Game 6 of the Western Conference Semifinals against the Colorado Avalanche, he scored the series-clinching goal by deflecting a shot past Avalanche goaltender David Aebischer.

On 20 August 2009, Goc signed a one-year $550,000 two-way contract with the Nashville Predators and after a very successful first half of the 2009–10 season, he was rewarded with a $775,000 one-year contract extension.

Goc signed a three-year contract as a free agent worth $5.1 million with the Florida Panthers on 1 July 2011. On 11 October 2011, Goc scored his first goal with the Panthers against the Pittsburgh Penguins.

On 5 March 2014, Goc was traded to the Pittsburgh Penguins for a 3rd and a 5th round pick. As a free agent Goc re-signed with the Penguins to a $1.2 million contract.

In the following 2014–15 season, on 22 October 2014, in a 5–3 loss to the Philadelphia Flyers, Goc scored his first goal with the Penguins. After 43 games with the Penguins on 27 January 2015, Goc was traded to the St. Louis Blues in exchange for Maxim Lapierre.

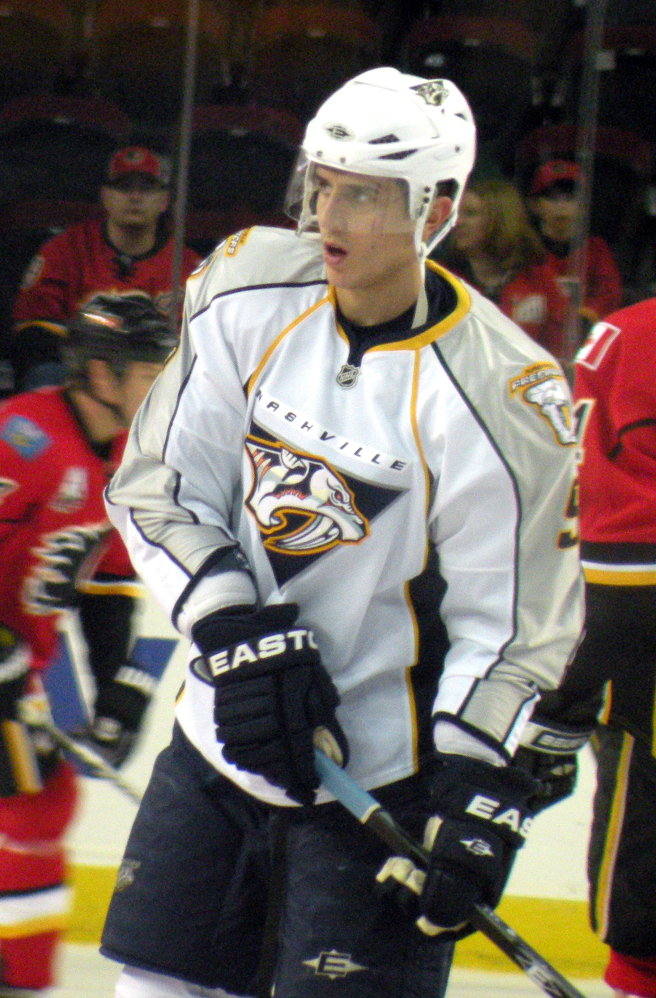
Goc warming up before a game during his tenure with the Nashville Predators

On September 1, 2015, as a free agent, Goc signalled the end of his NHL career in returning to Germany to sign a five-year contract with reigning Champions, Adler Mannheim of the DEL. In January 2017, he suffered a torn ACL and had to undergo surgery. Goc announced his retirement as a player in March 2020, but stayed with the Mannheim club, joining the coaching staff as a skills and development coach.

== International play ==
Goc has played for Team Germany in numerous tournaments, including the 2000 (as a sixteen-year-old) and 2001 World Junior Championships, the 2001 U18 Championships, the 2002 World Junior tournament, the 2003 Swiss Cup, eight World Championships, the 2006, 2010 and 2018 Winter Olympics. In 2018, he led Germany to a silver medal, serving as the team captain during the tournament. The NHL didn't release its players for the tournament, but Goc was able to participate as he was playing professionally in Germany. His best result at a World Championships was a fourth place finish in 2010.

Touted for his defensive prowess and faceoff skills, Goc was a fixture on Team Germany for 18 years. In April 2018, he announced the end of his international career after 112 caps, 17 goals and 18 assists for Germany.

== Career statistics ==
=== Regular season and playoffs ===
			Regular season					Playoffs
Season	Team	League	GP	G	A	Pts	PIM	GP	G	A	Pts	PIM
1999–2000	SERC Wild Wings	DEL	51	0	3	3	4	—	—	—	—	—
2000–01	SERC Wild Wings	DEL	58	13	28	41	12	—	—	—	—	—
2001–02	SERC Wild Wings	DEL	45	8	9	17	24	—	—	—	—	—
2001–02	Adler Mannheim	DEL	8	0	2	2	0	—	—	—	—	—
2002–03	Adler Mannheim	DEL	36	6	14	20	16	8	1	2	3	0
2003–04	Cleveland Barons	AHL	78	16	21	37	24	—	—	—	—	—
2003–04	San Jose Sharks	NHL	—	—	—	—	—	5	1	1	2	0
2004–05	Cleveland Barons	AHL	76	16	34	50	28	—	—	—	—	—
2005–06	San Jose Sharks	NHL	81	8	14	22	22	11	0	3	3	0
2006–07	San Jose Sharks	NHL	78	5	8	13	24	11	2	1	3	4
2007–08	San Jose Sharks	NHL	51	5	3	8	12	4	0	0	0	2
2008–09	San Jose Sharks	NHL	55	2	9	11	18	6	0	0	0	2
2009–10	Nashville Predators	NHL	73	12	18	30	14	6	0	1	1	2
2010–11	Nashville Predators	NHL	51	9	15	24	6	—	—	—	—	—
2011–12	Florida Panthers	NHL	57	11	16	27	10	7	2	3	5	0
2012–13	Adler Mannheim	DEL	18	4	15	19	8	—	—	—	—	—
2012–13	Florida Panthers	NHL	42	9	10	19	8	—	—	—	—	—
2013–14	Florida Panthers	NHL	62	11	12	23	31	—	—	—	—	—
2013–14	Pittsburgh Penguins	NHL	12	0	2	2	4	9	0	1	1	4
2014–15	Pittsburgh Penguins	NHL	43	2	4	6	4	—	—	—	—	—
2014–15	St. Louis Blues	NHL	31	1	2	3	4	4	0	0	0	0
2015–16	Adler Mannheim	DEL	3	0	0	0	2	3	1	2	3	6
2016–17	Adler Mannheim	DEL	38	9	19	28	12	—	—	—	—	—
2017–18	Adler Mannheim	DEL	42	4	12	16	6	10	1	2	3	0
2018–19	Adler Mannheim	DEL	9	0	2	2	4	14	1	3	4	4
2019–20	Adler Mannheim	DEL	34	0	5	5	10	—	—	—	—	—
DEL totals			342	44	109	153	98	35	4	9	13	10
NHL totals			636	75	113	188	157	63	5	10	15	14

=== International ===
Medal record

Representing Germany

Ice hockey

Olympic Games
Silver medal – second place	2018 Pyeongchang	

Year	Team	Event	Result	GP	G	A	Pts	PIM
2000	Germany	WJC B	12th	5	1	1	2	2
2000	Germany	WJC18	7th	6	2	1	3	10
2001	Germany	WJC D1	12th	5	0	1	1	2
2001	Germany	OGQ	Q	3	0	0	0	0
2001	Germany	WC	8th	7	0	0	0	2
2001	Germany	WJC18	5th	6	2	4	6	0
2002	Germany	WJC D1	11th	5	4	2	6	2
2003	Germany	WJC	9th	6	1	2	3	2
2003	Germany	WC	6th	7	1	2	3	0
2004	Germany	WCH	8th	3	0	1	1	2
2005	Germany	WC	15th	6	2	0	2	0
2006	Germany	OG	10th	5	1	0	1	0
2008	Germany	WC	10th	3	0	0	0	0
2010	Germany	OG	11th	4	2	1	3	0
2010	Germany	WC	4th	9	2	0	2	4
2012	Germany	WC	12th	7	0	0	0	2
2013	Germany	WC	9th	7	0	4	4	4
2016	Germany	WC	7th	8	1	1	2	2
2016	Germany	OGQ	Q	3	1	1	2	2
2018	Germany	OG	2nd place, silver medalist(s)	7	0	1	1	0
Tier I junior totals				18	5	7	12	12
Senior totals				73	9	10	19	16

== Awards and honours ==
Award	Year
DEL
Champion (Adler Mannheim)	2019

Awards and achievements
Preceded by Jeff Jillson	San Jose Sharks first-round draft pick 2001	Succeeded by Mike Morris
