= Health Tech Without Borders =

Global nonprofit

- Abbreviation: HTWB
- Type: International non-governmental organization.
- Region served: Worldwide
- Key people: Jarone Lee, Bob Arnot, Hicham Naim
- Website: www.htwb.org

Health Tech Without Borders is a global nonprofit that uses digital tools to address health care in crisis situations, especially in conflict zones. Its projects include deploying infrastructure for telemedicine appointments from a global network of volunteers, and creating chatbots in multiple languages to help medics with tactical medical care in combat situations.

== History ==
Health Tech Without Borders was created in the days after the 2022 Russian invasion of Ukraine to coordinate medical care for people impacted by the war.

Key doctors involved in the project are Jarone Lee, Bob Arnot and Hicham Naim.

=== Medical Care in War Zones ===
In addition to direct injuries due to armed conflict, war zones create other medical challenges. These include the disruption to water and sanitation, which can lead to infectious disease outbreaks. In addition, health care workers often leave conflict zones, leaving the areas severely understaffed, particularly in medical specialties. Health care facilities often become targets in war zones, forcing medical professionals to use unusual locations like basements or parking lots to deliver emergency medicine. As such, specific medical tools and procedures have to be adapted and developed for those circumstances, often using technologies.

== Russia Invasion of Ukraine ==
After the Russian invasion of Ukraine in 2022, HTWB pulled in more than 700 volunteers to provide 62,000-plus telehealth appointments to patients in Ukraine. Of those appointments, 98% of them were through text-based communications. Since then, the telehealth model to humanitarian efforts in Iraq, Mexico, and Pakistan.

== Tactical Combat Casualty Care Chatbot ==
In collaboration, with Microsoft's Disaster Response team, HTWB developed a chatbot that teaches the steps of Tactical Combat Casualty Care, the U.S. military combat medical guidelines, in English. The chatbot then was translated into Ukrainian and Arabic so it could be deployed in Ukraine and Sudan rapidly to provide medical care in combat situations.
