= Tom O'Regan =

American ice hockey player (born 1961)

- Born: December 29, 1961 (age 64) Cambridge, Massachusetts, U.S.
- Height: 5 ft 10 in (178 cm)
- Weight: 180 lb (82 kg; 12 st 12 lb)
- Position: Center/Defense
- Shot: Left
- Played for: Pittsburgh Penguins; EV Landshut; BSC Preussen; Berlin Preussen Devils; Berlin Capitals
- National team: United States
- NHL draft: Undrafted
- Playing career: 1983–1998

Thomas Patrick O'Regan (born December 29, 1961) is an American former professional ice hockey forward. He played 61 games in the National Hockey League with the Pittsburgh Penguins from 1984 to 1985. He then played in the German Bundesliga and Deutsche Eishockey Liga from 1987 to 1998. Internationally O'Regan played for the American national team at four World Championships.

== Career ==
O'Regan was a high school star at Matignon High School. O'Regan played 61 games for the Pittsburgh Penguins of the National Hockey League (NHL) in the mid 1980s. The majority of his career was spent in Germany where he was a top scorer in the Bundesliga for many years.

O'Regan played four years at Boston University, and was signed as a free agent by the Pittsburgh Penguins following his senior year. He played 51 games for the floundering Penguins during the 1983–84 season but was used rarely thereafter. Between 1985 and 1987 he recorded three straight 20-goal seasons in the American Hockey League (AHL). He joined the EV Landshut club of Germany in 1987–88 and played two seasons there. He later skated for the Devils and Capitals clubs of Berlin. O'Regan played for the United States at the World Championships in 1989, 1990, 1995 and 1996, winning a bronze medal at the latter. In 61 NHL games O'Regan recorded 5 goals and 12 assists for 17 career points.

== Family ==
His son Danny O'Regan was selected 138th overall by the San Jose Sharks in the 2012 NHL entry draft and currently plays for the Hartford Wolf Pack in the American Hockey League. Another son, Tommy O'Regan, played hockey for Harvard University and is now a stand-up comedian.

== Career statistics ==
=== Regular season and playoffs ===
			Regular season					Playoffs
Season	Team	League	GP	G	A	Pts	PIM	GP	G	A	Pts	PIM
1978–79	Cambridge Matignon School	HS-MA	24	21	33	54	—	—	—	—	—	—
1979–80	Boston University	ECAC	28	9	15	24	31	—	—	—	—	—
1980–81	Boston University	ECAC	20	10	10	20	41	—	—	—	—	—
1981–82	Boston University	ECAC	28	18	34	52	67	—	—	—	—	—
1982–83	Boston University	ECAC	29	16	18	34	47	—	—	—	—	—
1983–84	Pittsburgh Penguins	NHL	51	4	10	14	8	—	—	—	—	—
1983–84	Baltimore Skipjacks	AHL	25	13	14	27	15	—	—	—	—	—
1984–85	Pittsburgh Penguins	NHL	1	0	0	0	0	—	—	—	—	—
1984–85	Baltimore Skipjacks	AHL	62	28	28	56	62	15	4	5	9	10
1985–86	Pittsburgh Penguins	NHL	9	1	2	3	2	—	—	—	—	—
1985–86	Baltimore Skipjacks	AHL	61	23	31	54	65	—	—	—	—	—
1986–87	Adirondack Red Wings	AHL	58	20	42	62	78	11	3	9	12	10
1987–88	EV Landshut	GER	34	27	29	56	110	4	4	1	5	0
1988–89	EV Landshut	GER	36	19	34	53	74	3	2	1	3	8
1989–90	BSC Preussen	GER	34	27	32	59	71	6	1	5	6	14
1990–91	BSC Preussen	GER	42	21	26	47	72	8	6	3	9	6
1991–92	BSC Preussen	GER	42	20	30	50	93	7	3	2	5	6
1992–93	BSC Preussen	GER	30	11	18	29	98	6	1	2	3	16
1993–94	BSC Preussen	GER	42	18	28	46	66	11	5	9	14	8
1994–95	Berlin Preussen Devils	DEL	43	7	43	50	66	12	3	9	12	12
1995–96	erlin Preussen Devils	DEL	45	14	34	48	20	11	4	10	14	22
1996–97	Berlin Capitals	DEL	43	5	18	23	30	4	1	1	2	6
1997–98	Berlin Capitals	DEL	45	9	23	32	49	4	0	1	1	29
GER totals			260	143	197	340	584	45	22	23	45	58
DEL totals			176	35	118	153	165	31	8	21	29	69
NHL totals			61	5	12	17	10	—	—	—	—	—

=== International ===
Year	Team	Event	GP	G	A	Pts	PIM
1989	United States	WC	8	2	1	3	8
1990	United States	WC	10	1	1	2	6
1995	United States	WC	6	0	2	2	6
1996	United States	WC	8	0	0	0	4
Senior totals			32	3	4	7	24

== Transactions ==
- September 4, 1983 – Signed as a free agent by the Pittsburgh Penguins.
- September 29, 1986 – Signed as a free agent by the Detroit Red Wings.
