= Rick DiPietro =

American ice hockey player (born 1981)

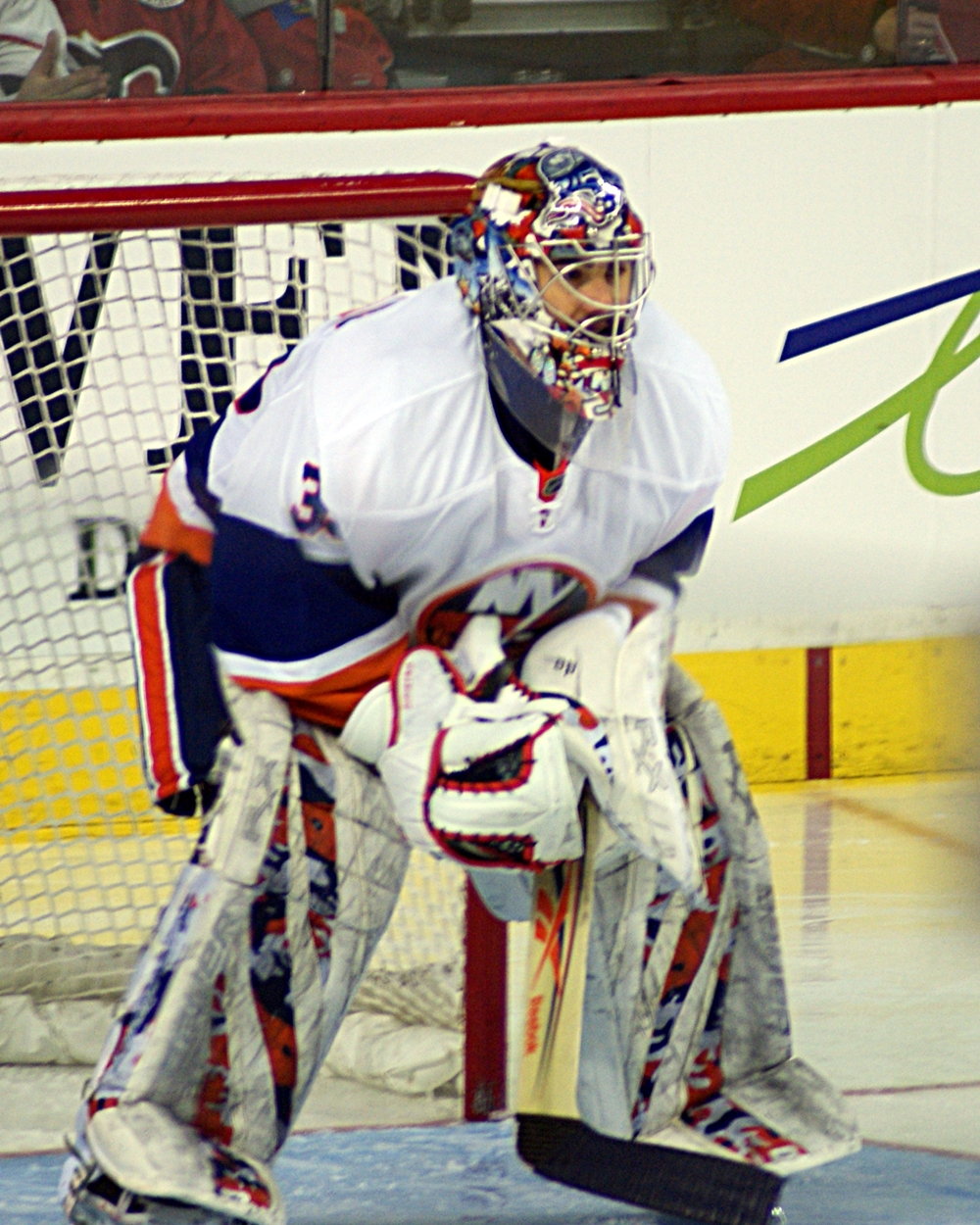
- DiPietro with the New York Islanders in January 2011
- Born: September 19, 1981 (age 45) Lewiston, Maine, U.S.
- Height: 6 ft 0 in (183 cm)
- Weight: 185 lb (84 kg; 13 st 3 lb)
- Position: Goaltender
- Caught: Right
- Played for: New York Islanders
- National team: United States
- NHL draft: 1st overall, 2000; New York Islanders
- Playing career: 2000–2013

Richard W. DiPietro Jr. (born September 19, 1981) is an American former professional ice hockey goaltender and current co-host of ESPN New York's "DiPietro and Rothenberg" with Dave Rothenberg. He is also an analyst on National Hockey League (NHL) telecasts on ESPN having started the 2021–22 season.

On June 24, 2000, DiPietro became the second goaltender in history selected first overall in an NHL entry draft when he was chosen by the New York Islanders. In 2006, the team signed him to a groundbreaking 15-year, $67.5 million contract, but a string of injuries beginning in 2008, which limited him to 50 NHL appearances over the next five seasons, led to a contract buyout on July 2, 2013, with eight years remaining on his contract. DiPietro retired after being released by the Charlotte Checkers of the American Hockey League (AHL) on November 26, 2013, with whom he had signed a tryout contract on October 25. Multiple hockey writers consider him to be a draft bust. As a result of his contract buyout, the Islanders will continue to pay DiPietro $1.5 million annually until the end of the 2028–29 season.

== Playing career ==
Born in Lewiston, Maine, Rick DiPietro moved to Winthrop, Massachusetts when he was 10. As a youth, he played in the 1994 Quebec International Pee-Wee Hockey Tournament with a minor ice hockey team from Beverly, Massachusetts.

=== Collegiate ===
DiPietro attended Saint Sebastian's School. He played one season (1999–2000) with Boston University in the National Collegiate Athletic Association (NCAA)'s Hockey East. In that one year, DiPietro was named to the All-Rookie Team, named Second Team All-Hockey East, awarded the team's co-MVP and was named Hockey East's Rookie of the Year. In addition, DiPietro nearly set the NCAA record for most saves in a game when he stopped 77 out of 80 shots in a 3–2 quadruple overtime loss to St. Lawrence University during the NCAA regional final. In his one and only Beanpot Tournament, DiPietro was named MVP and won the Eberly Trophy awarded to the tournament's top goaltender.

=== Professional ===
DiPietro was drafted first overall by the New York Islanders in the 2000 NHL entry draft, out of Boston University. Islanders general manager Mike Milbury traded incumbent goalie Roberto Luongo to create room for the highly touted DiPietro, who was known for his mobility and puckhandling skills. DiPietro became the fourth American to occupy the top draft position in the NHL entry draft.

A groin injury during training camp resulted in DiPietro starting the season with the Bridgeport Sound Tigers, the Islanders minor league affiliate in the American Hockey League (AHL). He was subsequently called up twice to join the Islanders, but did not play a game until January 27, 2001, when he debuted against the Buffalo Sabres. DiPietro's NHL debut was widely anticipated, but in 20 games in the 2000–01 season he managed just three wins against 15 losses for a struggling Islanders team. He played ten games the next season, as well as one playoff game, before being called up permanently in the 2003–04 season. His goals against average (GAA) improved from 3.49 in the 2000–01 season to 2.36 in the 2003–04 season.

On September 12, 2006, DiPietro signed a 15-year, $67.5 million contract with the Islanders, topping former teammate Alexei Yashin's contract signed before the start of the 2001–02 season of 10 years. Newsday reported that the team offered him a 15-year contract in September 2005, but the NHL front office discouraged the Islanders from making such an offer. Instead, DiPietro had signed on a one-year deal with the Islanders.

DiPietro's contract, the longest under the 2005 NHL collective bargaining agreement, was nearly surpassed during the 2010 off-season, when the New Jersey Devils attempted to sign Ilya Kovalchuk to a 17-year contract, but that offer was rejected by the NHL on the grounds of salary cap circumvention.

On March 5, 2007, DiPietro broke an Islanders franchise record by making 56 saves in a 2–1 shootout loss to the New York Rangers. The previous record was 55 saves, held by both Félix Potvin and Billy Smith. The record was later broken by Dwayne Roloson in 2009.

On March 13, 2007, DiPietro suffered a concussion after a collision with Montreal Canadiens forward Steve Bégin, when DiPietro raced out to poke check a puck at the blueline at 15:41 of the first period. DiPietro returned for four games but then missed the rest of the regular season after he sustained another concussion in a game against the Rangers. He returned to play games two through five of the Islanders' first round playoff series against the Buffalo Sabres.

The concussion was the start of a string of injuries. DiPietro underwent surgery in the 2007 off season to fix a torn labrum in his hip.

On November 19, 2007, DiPietro recorded his 100th NHL career win when the Islanders beat the New York Rangers 2–1.

DiPietro was selected to appear in his first and only All-Star Game in 2008 as a reserve, but was later named the starter after New Jersey Devils goaltender Martin Brodeur dropped out. During the skills competition the night before, DiPietro injured his hip during the shootout competition. DiPietro continued to play until the Islanders no longer had a chance to make the playoffs and on March 19, it was announced that DiPietro would miss the remainder of the 2007–08 season because of the hip surgery.

On June 3, 2008, DiPietro went on a Sirius satellite radio show being hosted by "Bubba the Love Sponge," where he told Bubba he would be undergoing knee surgery later that day. The surgery was done on the meniscus in his left knee. DiPietro sat out the first four games of the 2008–09 season (or, controversially, was on the bench as the backup) before starting the team's fifth game in Florida. He played two games after that, but left after the first period his third game back. After that, he was placed on injured reserve for an "undisclosed lower body injury." On November 1, it was announced DiPietro had undergone another knee surgery after injuring his meniscus. It is unknown whether it is the same knee that was operated on earlier that year. DiPietro returned to the team on December 26, 2008. He won his first game back and earned an assist, which broke Billy Smith's team record for points by a goaltender. On January 20, 2009, Islanders general manager Garth Snow announced that DiPietro would miss the rest of the 2008–09 season due to post-arthroscopic surgical swelling in his right knee.

On January 8, 2010, DiPietro returned from injury in a 4–3 loss to the Dallas Stars. His last start of 2010 came against the Carolina Hurricanes on February 6. He earned his fifth loss in seven starts, as the Islanders fell 3–1. On February 13, he was listed as day-to-day with the flu, and less than a month later, swelling in his left-knee caused him to be placed on the injured reserve list effective March 2, 2010; he did not return for the rest of the season.

DiPietro started the 2010–11 season apparently healthy and worked in a "platoon" tandem with Dwayne Roloson, but was placed on injured reserve due to knee swelling on December 21, 2010. He returned in the same month, but primarily as a backup since Roloson was playing well. He made his first start since returning on December 29 in a game against the Pittsburgh Penguins, in which DiPietro led the Islanders to victory over Pittsburgh in a 2–1 shootout decision. On December 31, the Islanders traded Roloson to the Tampa Bay Lightning, confirming the starting job for DiPietro. On February 2, 2011, in his first game against the Penguins since his shootout win, DiPietro engaged in a rare "goaltender fight" against Pittsburgh's Brent Johnson in the final seconds of the game. DiPietro took a single punch to the face that knocked him unconscious, inflicted a concussion, and broke his jaw. It is not known if the knee swelling was from the fight or another reason. DiPietro returned shortly to finish the season, wearing the old helmet and cage combo worn by former Islanders goaltender Chris Osgood.

The start of the 2011–12 season featured DiPietro in a three-way tandem with Al Montoya and Evgeni Nabokov. Due to a strong pre-season and his performances in DiPietro's absence the previous year, Montoya started the first two games and DiPietro was the backup. During practice for the Islanders' third game, DiPietro took a hard shot to his mask from Brian Rolston, which concussed him and sidelined him indefinitely. DiPietro returned to action in late October, returning to the more conventional one piece goaltender mask he sported for the majority of his career. On November 5, 2011, DiPietro made 25 saves to earn his first win of the 2011–12 season. Shortly after, he injured his groin and was again out indefinitely; he later required surgery to repair a hernia in the area, sidelining him for the remainder of the season.

After playing only three games in the lockout shortened 2012–13 season, DiPietro was waived by the Islanders and was sent to their AHL affiliate, the Bridgeport Sound Tigers. He had eight years remaining on his NHL contract. DiPietro started his first game as a member of the Sound Tigers on March 1, 2013. He allowed two goals on the first two shots of the game and five in the first period. He did not return from the locker room for the second period of play as the game eventually ended 7–3 in favor of the opposing Connecticut Whale.

In July 2013, the Islanders used a compliance buyout to terminate DiPietro's contract. Under the terms of NHL buyouts, DiPietro was to be paid ⅔ of the $36 million he would have been owed over the next 8 years at a rate of $1.5 million per year over the next 16 years. DiPietro signed a professional tryout contract on October 25, 2013, with the Carolina Hurricanes' AHL affiliate, Charlotte Checkers, playing his first game 5 days later in which he stopped 25 of 29 shots in a 5–2 loss to the Grand Rapids Griffins. He was cut by the Checkers on November 26.

== Post-playing career ==
After retiring DiPietro turned to radio broadcasting. He is a co-host of "DiPietro and Rothenberg" with Dave Rothenberg from 6–10 AM each weekday morning on WEPN-FM (880AM ESPN NY).

In 2019, DiPietro was named the Head Boys' Hockey Coach at the Portledge School. He was officially announced as an analyst on National Hockey League (NHL) telecasts on ESPN beginning with the 2021-2022 season on June 29, 2021.

== International play ==
DiPietro made his international debut at the junior level for the United States at the 1999 IIHF World U18 Championships. He would then play in the two following World Junior Championships in 2000 and 2001, awarded in the former as the tournament's best goaltender and selected to the All-Star Team.

He made his full international debut soon after his WJC experience with the United States at the 2001 World Championships. He would go on to compete for Team USA in the 2004 World Cup of Hockey and the 2005 World Championships.

Along with former Islanders teammates Jason Blake and Mark Parrish, DiPietro was named to the United States national hockey team at the 2006 Winter Olympics in Turin, Italy, in February 2006. DiPietro was the U.S.' number one goaltender for the tournament, starting four of the team's six games. DiPietro played well, sporting a 2.28 GAA, but went 1–3 in the men's tournament.

== Career statistics ==
=== Regular season and playoffs ===
| | | | Regular season | | | | | | | | | | Playoffs |
| Season | Team | League | GP | W | L | T | OTL | MIN | GA | SO | GAA | SV% | GP | W | L | MIN | GA | SO | GAA | SV% |
|---|---|---|---|---|---|---|---|---|---|---|---|---|---|---|---|---|---|---|---|---|
| 1997–98 | Saint Sebastian's School | HS-Prep | — | — | — | — | — | — | — | — | — | — | — | — | — | — | — | — | — | — |
| 1997–98 | U.S. NTDP Juniors | USHL | 3 | 0 | 2 | 0 | — | 117 | 8 | 0 | 4.09 | .886 | — | — | — | — | — | — | — | — |
| 1997–98 | U.S. NTDP U17 | USDP | 10 | 6 | 4 | 0 | — | 800 | 31 | 0 | 2.33 | — | — | — | — | — | — | — | — | — |
| 1997–98 | U.S. NTDP U18 | NAHL | 30 | 13 | 12 | 0 | — | 1,602 | 85 | 1 | 3.18 | .893 | 3 | 2 | 1 | 179 | 7 | 1 | 2.35 | .904 |
| 1998–99 | U.S. NTDP Juniors | USHL | 30 | 22 | 6 | 1 | — | 1,733 | 67 | 3 | 2.32 | .907 | — | — | — | — | — | — | — | — |
| 1998–99 | U.S. NTDP U18 | USDP | 16 | 9 | 5 | 1 | — | 1,027 | 46 | — | 2.69 | — | — | — | — | — | — | — | — | — |
| 1999–00 | Boston University | HE | 30 | 18 | 5 | 5 | — | 1,791 | 73 | 1 | 2.45 | .913 | — | — | — | — | — | — | — | — |
| 2000–01 | New York Islanders | NHL | 20 | 3 | 15 | 1 | — | 1,083 | 63 | 0 | 3.49 | .878 | — | — | — | — | — | — | — | — |
| 2000–01 | Chicago Wolves | IHL | 14 | 4 | 5 | 2 | — | 778 | 44 | 0 | 3.39 | .880 | — | — | — | — | — | — | — | — |
| 2001–02 | Bridgeport Sound Tigers | AHL | 59 | 30 | 22 | 7 | — | 3,472 | 134 | 4 | 2.32 | .913 | 20 | 12 | 8 | 1,270 | 45 | 3 | 2.13 | .906 |
| 2002–03 | Bridgeport Sound Tigers | AHL | 34 | 16 | 10 | 8 | — | 2,044 | 73 | 3 | 2.14 | .924 | 5 | 2 | 3 | 299 | 10 | 1 | 2.01 | .925 |
| 2002–03 | New York Islanders | NHL | 10 | 2 | 5 | 2 | — | 585 | 29 | 0 | 2.97 | .894 | 1 | 0 | 0 | 15 | 0 | 0 | 0.00 | 1.000 |
| 2003–04 | New York Islanders | NHL | 50 | 23 | 18 | 5 | — | 2,844 | 112 | 5 | 2.36 | .911 | 5 | 1 | 4 | 303 | 11 | 1 | 2.18 | .908 |
| 2003–04 | Bridgeport Sound Tigers | AHL | 2 | 0 | 2 | 0 | — | 119 | 3 | 0 | 1.51 | .945 | — | — | — | — | — | — | — | — |
| 2005–06 | New York Islanders | NHL | 63 | 30 | 24 | — | 5 | 3,572 | 180 | 1 | 3.02 | .900 | — | — | — | — | — | — | — | — |
| 2006–07 | New York Islanders | NHL | 62 | 32 | 19 | — | 9 | 3,627 | 156 | 5 | 2.58 | .919 | 4 | 1 | 3 | 236 | 13 | 0 | 3.30 | .898 |
| 2007–08 | New York Islanders | NHL | 63 | 26 | 28 | — | 7 | 3,707 | 174 | 3 | 2.82 | .902 | — | — | — | — | — | — | — | — |
| 2008–09 | New York Islanders | NHL | 5 | 1 | 3 | — | 0 | 256 | 15 | 0 | 3.52 | .892 | — | — | — | — | — | — | — | — |
| 2009–10 | New York Islanders | NHL | 8 | 2 | 5 | — | 0 | 462 | 20 | 1 | 2.60 | .901 | — | — | — | — | — | — | — | — |
| 2009–10 | Bridgeport Sound Tigers | AHL | 4 | 1 | 2 | — | 0 | 199 | 11 | 0 | 3.31 | .883 | — | — | — | — | — | — | — | — |
| 2010–11 | New York Islanders | NHL | 26 | 8 | 14 | — | 4 | 1,533 | 88 | 1 | 3.44 | .886 | — | — | — | — | — | — | — | — |
| 2011–12 | New York Islanders | NHL | 8 | 3 | 2 | — | 3 | 354 | 22 | 0 | 3.73 | .875 | — | — | — | — | — | — | — | — |
| 2012–13 | SC Riessersee | DEU.2 | 1 | 0 | 1 | — | 0 | 59 | 3 | 0 | 3.03 | .856 | — | — | — | — | — | — | — | — |
| 2012–13 | New York Islanders | NHL | 3 | 0 | 3 | — | 0 | 176 | 12 | 0 | 4.09 | .855 | — | — | — | — | — | — | — | — |
| 2012–13 | Bridgeport Sound Tigers | AHL | 18 | 9 | 9 | — | 0 | 1,022 | 50 | 1 | 2.93 | .893 | — | — | — | — | — | — | — | — |
| 2013–14 | Charlotte Checkers | AHL | 5 | 0 | 4 | — | 0 | 220 | 19 | 0 | 5.18 | .846 | — | — | — | — | — | — | — | — |
| NHL totals | | | 318 | 130 | 136 | 8 | 28 | 18,199 | 871 | 16 | 2.87 | .902 | 10 | 2 | 7 | 554 | 24 | 1 | 2.60 | .904 |

=== International ===
| Year | Team | Event | GP | W | L | T | MIN | GA | SO | GAA | SV% |
|---|---|---|---|---|---|---|---|---|---|---|---|
| 1999 | United States | WJC18 | 4 | — | — | — | — | — | — | 3.25 | .869 |
| 2000 | United States | WJC | 5 | 2 | 2 | 1 | 299 | 9 | 1 | 1.81 | .935 |
| 2001 | United States | WJC | 6 | 5 | 1 | 0 | 360 | 8 | 1 | 1.33 | .927 |
| 2001 | United States | WC | 3 | — | — | — | 179 | 8 | 0 | 2.68 | .919 |
| 2004 | United States | WCH | 1 | 1 | 0 | 0 | 60 | 1 | 0 | 1.00 | .941 |
| 2005 | United States | WC | 4 | 2 | 2 | 0 | 250 | 7 | 1 | 1.68 | .942 |
| 2006 | United States | OLY | 4 | 1 | 3 | 0 | 237 | 9 | 0 | 2.28 | .893 |
| Senior totals | | | 12 | — | — | — | 726 | 25 | 1 | 2.07 | .922 |

== Awards and honors ==
| Award | Year |
College
| All-HE Rookie Team | 2000 |
| All-HE Second Team | 2000 |
| HE Rookie of the Year | 2000 |
| New England MVP | 2000 |
AHL
| All-Star Game | 2002 |
NHL
| All-Star Game | 2008 |
International
| WJC Best Goaltender | 2000 |
| WJC All-Star Team | 2000 |

Awards and achievements
| Preceded by Darren Haydar | Hockey East Rookie of the Year; 1999–00 | Succeeded by Chuck Kobasew |
Sporting positions
| Preceded by Patrik Štefan | NHL first overall draft pick 2000 | Succeeded by Ilya Kovalchuk |
| Preceded by Kristián Kudroč | New York Islanders first round pick 2000 | Succeeded by Raffi Torres |
