= Connor Strachan =

American football player (born 1995)

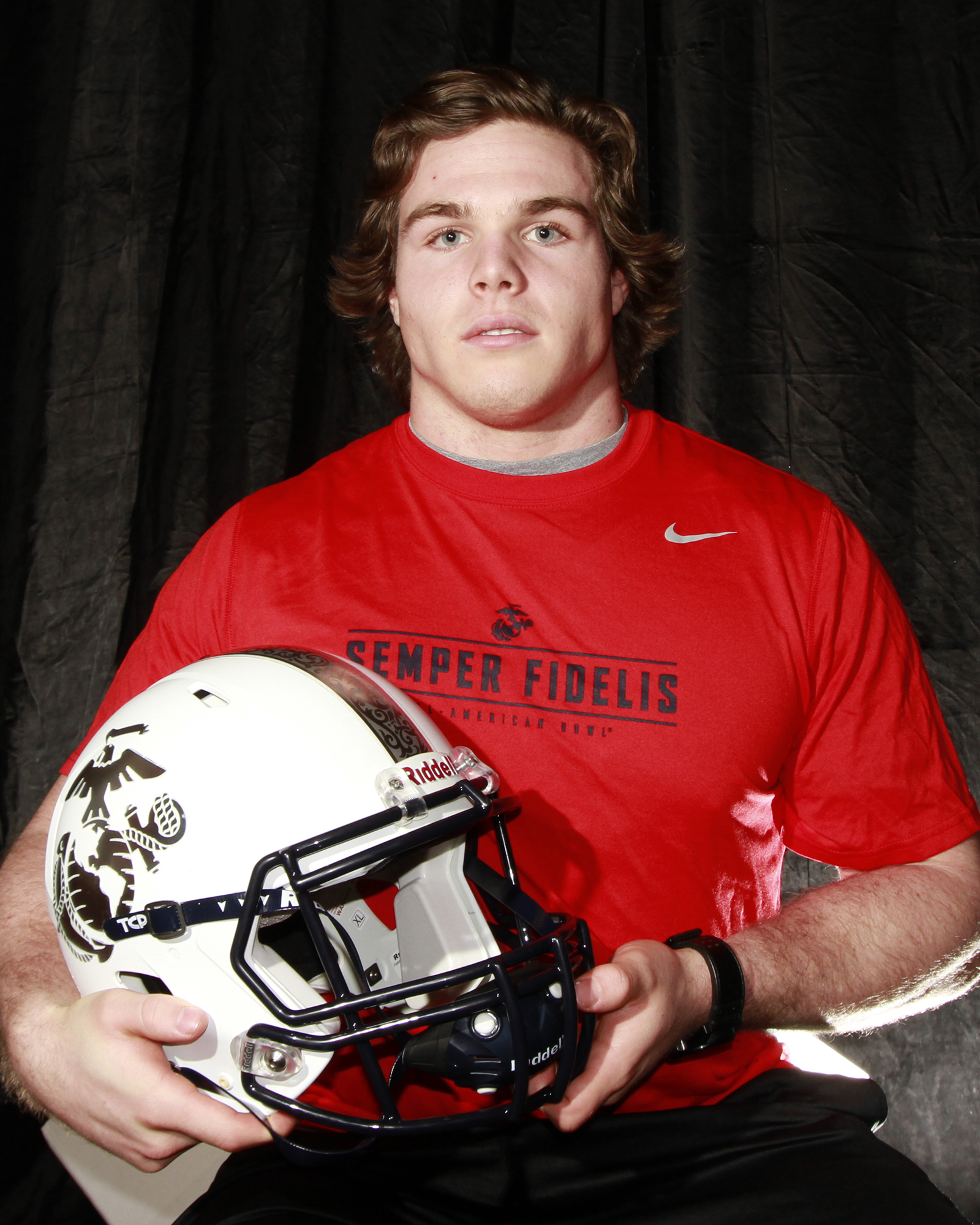
- Strachan c. 2014

No. 50
- Position: Linebacker

Personal information
- Born: June 30, 1995 (age 31); Wellesley, Massachusetts
- Listed height: 6 ft 0 in (1.83 m)
- Listed weight: 230 lb (104 kg)

Career information
- High school: Saint Sebastian's School
- College: Boston College
- NFL draft: 2019: undrafted

Career history
- Jacksonville Jaguars (2019)*; Houston Texans (2021–2022)
- * Offseason or practice squad member only

Career NFL statistics
- Games played: 3
- Tackles: 3
- Stats at Pro Football Reference

Connor Strachan (born June 30, 1995) is an American football linebacker who is currently a free agent. He played three games for the Houston Texans between December 2021 and January 2022.

== College career ==
Strachan attended Boston College and played 42 games as linebacker with the Boston College Eagles in the Atlantic Coast Conference, between 2014 and 2018. During this period he made 154 solo tackles, 113 assisted tackles, two interceptions, six recovered fumbles and one touchdown.

== Professional career ==
After going undrafted in the 2019 NFL draft Strachan signed with the Jacksonville Jaguars as an undrafted free agent on April 28. Strachan was cut during final roster cuts. On October 19, 2021, Strachan signed with to the Houston Texans. He played his first game on December 19, 2021 against Jacksonville, his second on December 26 against the Los Angeles Chargers and his third on January 9, 2022 against the Tennessee Titans. The Texans waived Strachan on March 22, 2022.
