= Jarone Lee =

American emergency physician and non-profit executive

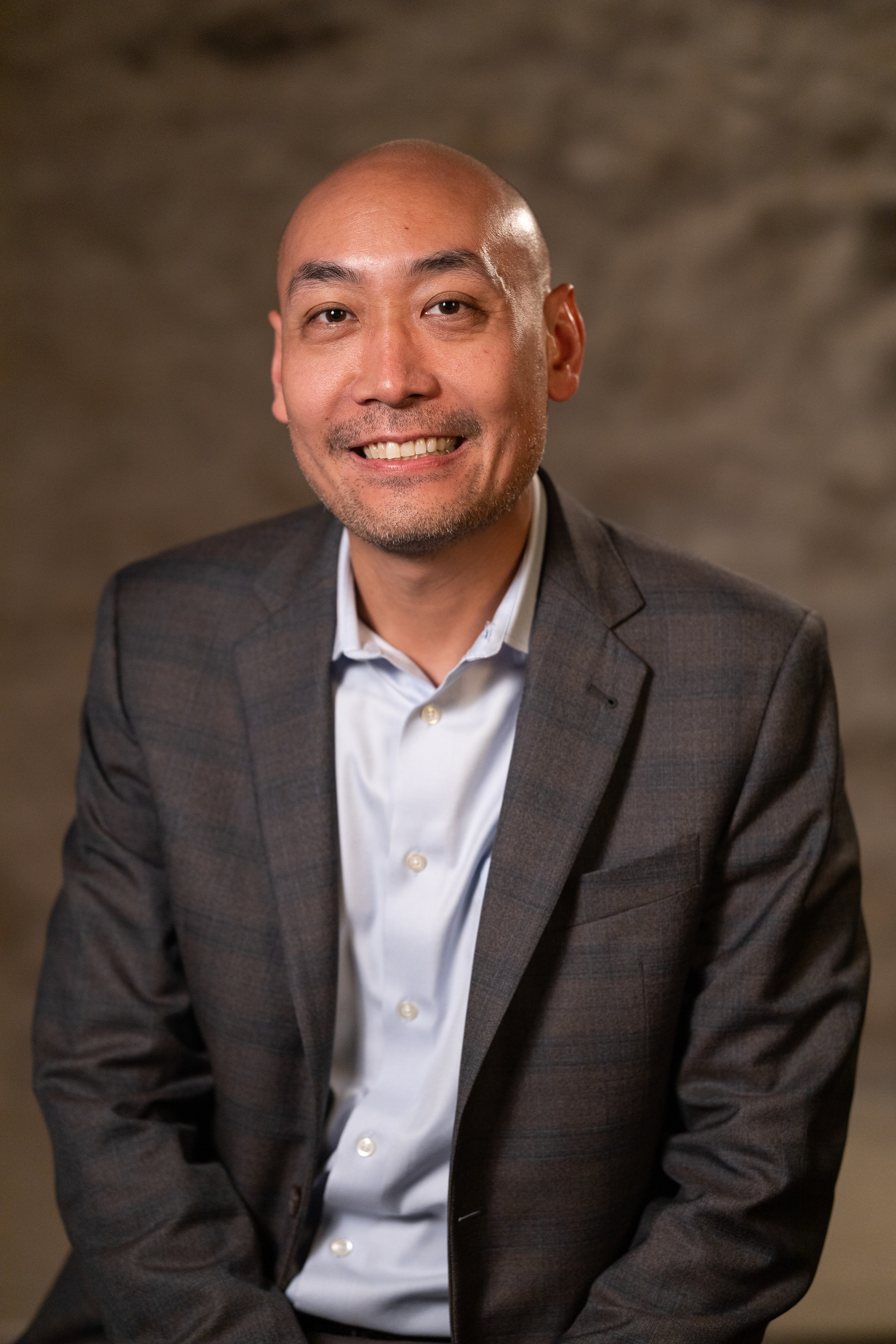
- Education: Icahn School of Medicine at Mount Sinai (MD)
- Occupations: Physician, professor, nonprofit executive
- Employer(s): Massachusetts General Hospital, Harvard Medical School
- Known for: Co-founding Health Tech Without Borders

Jarone Lee is an American physician, professor, and nonprofit executive. He is a co-founder of Health Tech Without Borders (HWTB), a global nonprofit that leverages digital tools to mitigate healthcare crises, especially in conflict zones.

In addition, he is the Vice Chief of Critical Care for the Division of Trauma, Emergency Surgery, Surgical Critical Care at Massachusetts General Hospital, and an associate professor at the Harvard Medical School.

Lee serves as Chief Medical Officer for the federal disaster medical assistance team in Massachusetts. He is also an editorial board member of BMC Anesthesiology, and serves on Boston's Live Long and Well Advisory Council established by Michelle Wu.

== Education ==
Lee earned a Doctor of Medicine from the Icahn School of Medicine at Mount Sinai in 2007 and further trained in emergency medicine at St. Luke's–Roosevelt Hospital and Massachusetts General Hospital.

== Career ==
=== Covid-19 ===
During the COVID-19 pandemic, Lee, working as an emergency medicine and critical care physician, looked for ways to augment telemedicine and telehealth, drawing on his past experiences as a disaster responder and the effectivity of such processes during Hurricane Irma. He and Paul Hattis started an interview series for CommonWealth Beacon, where Hattis asked Lee questions about what was happening on the frontlines during lockdown.

=== Russia Invasion of Ukraine ===
Lee and others co-founded HTWB in 2022 in the days after Russia invaded Ukraine to bring telehealth support for Ukrainians. It collaborated with the Ukrainian Ministry of Health to recruit volunteers, with a focus on Russian and Ukrainian-speaking medical professionals, and solicit donations from tech companies. Over 62,000 remote appointments were completed.

In 2024, Lee brought a contingent of Ukrainian doctors to Boston for two weeks of training. This included efforts in music medicine, done in collaboration with the Berklee Music and Health Institute.

Compared to the COVID-19 pandemic, Lee said he and his collaborators found that "Ukrainian efforts by necessity have been much more aggressive."
