= Bob Arnot =

Journalist, Author, & Former TV Host

Bob Arnot, M.D.
- Education: internal medicine
- Occupations: Journalist, Author, Physician
- Known for: Medical and foreign correspondent (NBC, CBS); host of Dr. Danger; humanitarian work with Lifeline Iraq and Greater Syria Working Group
- Notable work: The Aztec Diet, The Coffee Lover's Diet, The Breast Cancer Prevention Diet
- Television: Dateline NBC, NBC Nightly News, CBS Evening News, Dr. Danger

Bob Arnot, M.D., internal medicine, is a journalist, author, former host of the Dr. Danger reality TV series, and previously medical and foreign correspondent for NBC and CBS.

== Books ==
- The Aztec Diet, HarperCollins
- The Best Medicine, Addison Wesley
- The Breast Cancer Prevention Diet, Little Brown
- Turning Back the Clock, Little Brown
- Revolutionary Weight Control, Little Brown
- The Prostate Cancer Prevention Plan, Little Brown
- The Biology of Success, Little Brown
- The Breast Health Cookbook, Little Brown
- Beating Wear and Tear, Simon & Schuster
- How to Prevent a Heart Attack, Simon & Schuster
- Sport Selection with Charles Gaines, Viking
- Your Survival, Hatherleigh
- The Coffee Lover's Diet, HarperCollins

== Television ==
- Foreign correspondent. NBC and MSNBC. 2001–2004
- Medical correspondent, Dateline NBC, Today, NBC Nightly News, 1996-2000
- Medical correspondent, CBS News, CBS Evening News, 48 Hours, CBS This Morning, 1984-1996
- Dr. Danger

== Columnist and writer ==
- Men's Journal
- Vanity Fair

== Humanitarian aid ==
- Founder and chairman of Lifeline Iraq
- Co-founder of American Working Group on Greater Syria
- Co-founder of Health Tech Without Borders
- Past or present board member for:
  - Save the Children
  - UN High Commission for Refugees (USA)
  - Artists for Peace and Justice
  - US Committee for Refugees
  - Lindberg Foundation
  - Global Outreach Doctors
