= Independent School League (New England) =

Athletic league of Boston-area preparatory schools

- Founded: 1948
- Sports fielded: 25; men's: 11; women's: 12; coeducational: 2
- No. of teams: 16
- Region: New England
- Confederation: NEPSAC
- Website: islsports.org

The Independent School League (ISL) is an athletic conference of sixteen private college-preparatory schools in Greater Boston. Its parent organization is the New England Preparatory School Athletic Council (NEPSAC). Founded in 1948, the ISL sponsors competitions in twenty-five sports.

The ISL hosts some of the nation's oldest high school athletic rivalries, including Milton-Nobles and Groton-St. Mark's, both of which date back to 1886.

== History ==
=== Composition ===
In 1948, administrators at Belmont Hill, Brooks, Browne & Nichols (now BB&N), Governor Dummer (now The Governor's Academy), Milton, Noble & Greenough, St. Mark's, and Tabor established the Private School League. From the start, the ISL contained a mix of day and boarding schools, as well as religious and nonsectarian schools. The league changed its name to the Independent School League in 1974.

In the 1960s and 1970s, Middlesex, Groton, St. Sebastian's, Roxbury Latin, St. Paul's, Lawrence, Rivers, and St. George's joined the league. Tabor left the league in 1972 and St. Paul's left in 2017, at which point Tabor rejoined the league.

=== Stance on scholarships and postgraduates ===
The ISL forbids member schools from providing athletic scholarships (or any other scholarships not based strictly on the student's financial need), a policy that has been met with some controversy. In 2011, the ISL found that Lawrence Academy had granted excessive financial aid to some of its football players, in addition to scheduling too many football practices in the off-season; as a result, the ISL stripped Lawrence of its 2009 and 2010 football conference titles and imposed a three-year bowl ban. Previously, St. George's (which Lawrence had defeated 48-15 the previous year) "made national headlines" by forfeiting its conference football game against Lawrence, asserting that the Lawrence team had such a large talent advantage over its conference rivals that playing Lawrence was a safety risk to its own athletes. Citing this policy, St. Paul's left the ISL in 2017; it is now a member of the Lakes Region League.

The ISL also forbids member schools from fielding postgraduate students on their sports teams. Accordingly, future NBA player Duncan Robinson was required to transfer from Governor's to Phillips Exeter for his postgraduate year.

=== Absence of rowing competition ===
The ISL does not sponsor rowing, even though eight of the sixteen ISL schools (Belmont Hill, Brooks, BB&N, Groton, Middlesex, Nobles, St. Mark's, and Tabor) have boys' and girls' crews. New England high school rowing is administered by the New England Interscholastic Rowing Association (NEIRA), which was founded in 1947 and predates the ISL by one year.

Since NEIRA began awarding team championships in 1984 (for boys) and 1989 (for girls), the crews of ISL member schools have won the boys' coxed fours team trophy 32 out of 37 years, and the girls' coxed fours team trophy 18 out of 32 years. With the exception of Tabor and the now-departed St. Paul's, ISL schools do not compete in boys' and girls' eights, where teams like Kent, Andover, and Exeter participate.

== Members ==
=== Current Members ===
School	Location	Colors	Nickname	Founded	Joined	HS Enrollment	Day/Boarding	Religious Affiliation
Belmont Hill School	Belmont, MA		Sextants	1923	1948	471 (boys only)	Day (primary)	Nonsectarian
Brooks School	North Andover, MA			1926	1948	353	Boarding	Episcopal
Buckingham Browne & Nichols School	Cambridge, MA		Knights	1883	1948	525	Day	Nonsectarian
The Governor's Academy	Byfield, MA		Governors	1763	1948	405	Boarding	Nonsectarian
Groton School	Groton, MA		Zebras	1884	1972	351	Boarding	Episcopal
Lawrence Academy at Groton	Groton, MA		Spartans	1793	1973	424	Boarding	Nonsectarian
Middlesex School	Concord, MA		Zebras	1901	1968	402	Boarding	Nonsectarian
Milton Academy	Milton, MA		Mustangs	1798	1948	471	Boarding	Nonsectarian
Noble and Greenough School	Dedham, MA		Bulldogs	1866	1948	518	Day (primary)	Nonsectarian
The Rivers School	Weston, MA		Red Wings	1915	1973	382	Day	Nonsectarian
Roxbury Latin School	West Roxbury, MA		Foxes	1645	1974	219 (boys only)	Day	Nonsectarian
St. George's School	Middletown, RI		Dragons	1896	1981	380	Boarding	Episcopal
St. Mark's School	Southborough, MA		Lions	1865	1948	380	Boarding	Episcopal
St. Sebastian's School	Needham, MA		Arrows	1941	1973	380 (boys only)	Day	Catholic
Tabor Academy	Marion, MA		Seawolves	1876	1948*, 2017	507	Boarding	Nonsectarian
Thayer Academy	Braintree, MA		Tigers	1877	1948	496	Day	Nonsectarian

=== Former Member ===
School	Location	Colors	Nickname	Founded	Joined	Left	HS Enrollment	Day/Boarding	Religious Affiliation
St. Paul's School	Concord, NH		Pelicans	1856	1948	2017	540	Boarding	Episcopal

== Sponsored sports ==
Member schools compete in the following sports:

Boys' and/or co-ed sports
School	Cross country	Football	Soccer	Basketball	Ice hockey	Skiing	Squash	Wrestling	Baseball	Golf	Lacrosse	Tennis	Track
Belmont Hill	Yes	Yes	Yes	Yes	Yes	Yes	Yes	Yes	Yes	Yes	Yes	Yes	Yes
Brooks	Yes	Yes	Yes	Yes	Yes	No	Yes	Yes	Yes	Yes	Yes	Yes	No
BB&N	Yes	Yes	Yes	Yes	Yes	No	Yes	Yes	Yes	Yes	Yes	Yes	Yes
Governor's	Yes	Yes	Yes	Yes	Yes	Yes	No	Yes	Yes	Yes	Yes	Yes	Yes
Groton	Yes	Yes	Yes	Yes	Yes	No	Yes	No	Yes	No	Yes	Yes	Yes
Lawrence	Yes	Yes	Yes	Yes	Yes	Yes	No	No	Yes	Yes	Yes	Yes	Yes
Middlesex	Yes	Yes	Yes	Yes	Yes	Yes	Yes	Yes	Yes	Yes	Yes	Yes	Yes
Milton	Yes	Yes	Yes	Yes	Yes	Yes	Yes	Yes	Yes	Yes	Yes	Yes	Yes
Nobles	Yes	Yes	Yes	Yes	Yes	Yes	Yes	Yes	Yes	Yes	Yes	Yes	Yes
Rivers	Yes	Yes	Yes	Yes	Yes	Yes	No	No	Yes	Yes	Yes	Yes	Yes
Roxbury Latin	Yes	Yes	Yes	Yes	Yes	No	No	Yes	Yes	No	Yes	Yes	Yes
St. George's	Yes	Yes	Yes	Yes	Yes	No	Yes	No	Yes	Yes	Yes	Yes	Yes
St. Mark's	Yes	Yes	Yes	Yes	Yes	No	Yes	Yes	Yes	Yes	Yes	Yes	No
St. Sebastian's	Yes	Yes	Yes	Yes	Yes	Yes	Yes	Yes	Yes	Yes	Yes	Yes	No
Tabor	Yes	Yes	Yes	Yes	Yes	No	Yes	Yes	Yes	Yes	Yes	Yes	Yes
Thayer	Yes	Yes	Yes	Yes	Yes	Yes	No	Yes	Yes	Yes	Yes	Yes	Yes

Girls' sports
School	Cross country	Field hockey	Soccer	Volleyball	Basketball	Ice hockey	Skiing	Squash	Lacrosse	Softball	Tennis	Track
Brooks	Yes	Yes	Yes	Yes	Yes	Yes	No	Yes	Yes	Yes	Yes	No
BB&N	Yes	Yes	Yes	Yes	Yes	Yes	No	Yes	Yes	Yes	Yes	Yes
Governor's	Yes	Yes	Yes	Yes	Yes	Yes	Yes	No	Yes	Yes	Yes	Yes
Groton	Yes	Yes	Yes	Yes	Yes	Yes	No	Yes	Yes	No	Yes	Yes
Lawrence	Yes	Yes	Yes	Yes	Yes	Yes	Yes	No	Yes	Yes	Yes	Yes
Middlesex	Yes	Yes	Yes	Yes	Yes	Yes	Yes	Yes	Yes	No	Yes	Yes
Milton	Yes	Yes	Yes	Yes	Yes	Yes	Yes	Yes	Yes	Yes	Yes	Yes
Nobles	Yes	Yes	Yes	Yes	Yes	Yes	Yes	Yes	Yes	Yes	Yes	Yes
Rivers	Yes	Yes	Yes	Yes	Yes	Yes	Yes	No	Yes	Yes	Yes	Yes
St. George's	Yes	Yes	Yes	Yes	Yes	Yes	No	Yes	Yes	No	Yes	Yes
St. Mark's	Yes	Yes	Yes	Yes	Yes	Yes	No	Yes	Yes	Yes	Yes	No
Tabor	Yes	Yes	Yes	Yes	Yes	Yes	No	Yes	Yes	Yes	Yes	Yes
Thayer	Yes	Yes	Yes	Yes	Yes	Yes	Yes	No	Yes	Yes	Yes	Yes

== Divisional play in boys' football and ice hockey ==
The ISL divides its football and boys' ice hockey teams into separate divisions (ISL 7/ISL 9 for football; Keller/Eberhart for hockey). The divisional structure generally separates the larger schools (by total boys' enrollment) from the smaller schools, paralleling NEPSAC's separation of the New England hockey playoffs into Large School and Small School brackets. However, the NEPSAC divisions are based strictly on the size of the student body (which may also vary from year to year), which occasionally generates discrepancies between the ISL and NEPSAC classifications. For example, at the 2023 New England boys' ice hockey championships, Keller Division teams Milton, Nobles, and Belmont Hill competed in the open (Top 8) bracket, Keller team St. Sebastian's competed in the Large School division, and Keller teams Lawrence and Governors competed with Eberhart teams St. Mark's and Brooks in the Small School division. Ironically, an Eberhart team (Brooks) won the Large School championship in 2015, and another Eberhart team (Rivers) made it to the New England semifinals in 2018.

=== Football ===
As of the fall 2023 season, the ISL was divided into the following divisions for football:

- ISL 7 Division: Belmont Hill, BB&N, Governor's, Lawrence, Milton, St. Sebastian's, Tabor
- ISL 9 Division: Brooks, Groton, Middlesex, Nobles, Rivers, Roxbury Latin, St. George's, St. Mark's, Thayer

=== Boys' ice hockey ===
As of the winter 2023-24 season, the ISL was divided into the following divisions for ice hockey:

- Keller Division: Belmont Hill, Governor's, Lawrence, Milton, Nobles, St. Sebastian's, Thayer, Tabor
- Eberhart Division: Brooks, BB&N, Groton, Middlesex, Roxbury Latin, Rivers, St. George's, St. Mark's
