= Cornell Big Red men's ice hockey =

Men's ice hockey team of Cornell University

- Current season
- University: Cornell University
- Conference: ECAC
- First season: 1899–1900; 127 years ago
- Head coach: Casey Jones; 2nd season, 22–11–1 (.662)
- Assistant coaches: Sean Flanagan; Chris Brown; Cam Clarke
- Captain(s): Ryan Walsh
- Alternate captain(s): Tyler Catalano; Luke Devlin; George Fegaras; Jake Kraft
- Arena: Lynah Rink; Ithaca, New York
- Colors: Carnelian and white

NCAA tournament champions
- 1967, 1970

NCAA tournament runner-up
- 1969, 1972

NCAA tournament Frozen Four
- 1967, 1968, 1969, 1970, 1972, 1973, 1980, 2003

NCAA tournament appearances
- 1967, 1968, 1969, 1970, 1972, 1973, 1980, 1981, 1986, 1991, 1996, 1997, 2002, 2003, 2005, 2006, 2009, 2010, 2012, 2017, 2018, 2019, 2023, 2024, 2025, 2026

Conference tournament champions
- ECAC: 1967, 1968, 1969, 1970, 1973, 1980, 1986, 1996, 1997, 2003, 2005, 2010, 2024, 2025

Conference regular season champions
- IHA: 1911; ECAC: 1968, 1969, 1970, 1972, 1973, 2002, 2003, 2005, 2018, 2019, 2020

Ivy League regular season champions
- 1966, 1967, 1968, 1969, 1970, 1971, 1972, 1973, 1977, 1978, 1983, 1984, 1985, 1996, 1997, 2002, 2003, 2004, 2005, 2012, 2014, 2018, 2019, 2020, 2023, 2024, 2026

Current uniform

The Cornell Big Red men's ice hockey team is a National Collegiate Athletic Association (NCAA) Division I college ice hockey program that represents Cornell University. Cornell competes in the ECAC Hockey conference and plays its home games at Lynah Rink in Ithaca, New York. Six of the eight Ivy League schools sponsor men's hockey and all six teams play in the 12-team ECAC. The Ivy League crowns a champion based on the results of the games played between its members during the ECAC season.

Cornell has won the ECAC Championship a record 14 times and since the formal creation of the Ivy League athletic conference in 1956 has won the Ivy League title a record 27 times (23 outright, four tied), three more than Harvard's 24 (20 outright, four tied).

The 1970 Cornell Hockey team, coached by Ned Harkness was the first (and currently only team) in NCAA hockey history to win a national title while being undefeated and untied with a perfect 29–0–0 record.

The Big Red's archrival is the Harvard Crimson. The teams meet at least twice each season for installments of the historic Cornell–Harvard hockey rivalry.

== History ==
=== Background ===
During Christmas break of 1894–95, Yale University student Malcolm Greene Chace, later known as the "father of hockey in the United States," invited Alexander Meiklejohn, along with a team of men from Yale, Brown, Harvard, and Columbia to tour Canada with the goal of learning the Canadian game of ice hockey, which differed from the game of ice polo normally played by American college students. Upon their return, the students established hockey clubs at their respective schools. Meiklejohn promoted the game at Cornell, where he was a graduate student.

=== Early years ===
Early years

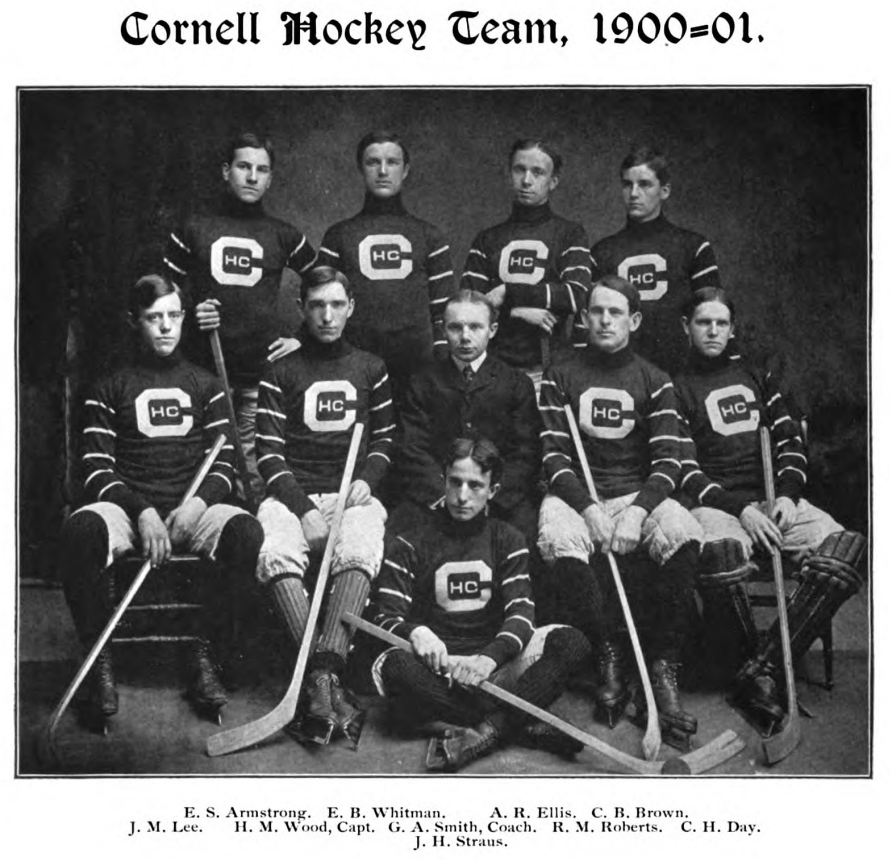
Cornell University team in 1900–01. Top to bottom row from left: Erwin Armstrong, Ezra Whitman, Albert Ellis, Charles Brown, John Lee, Herbert Wood, G. A. Smith, Roger Roberts, Charles Day, Joseph Straus.

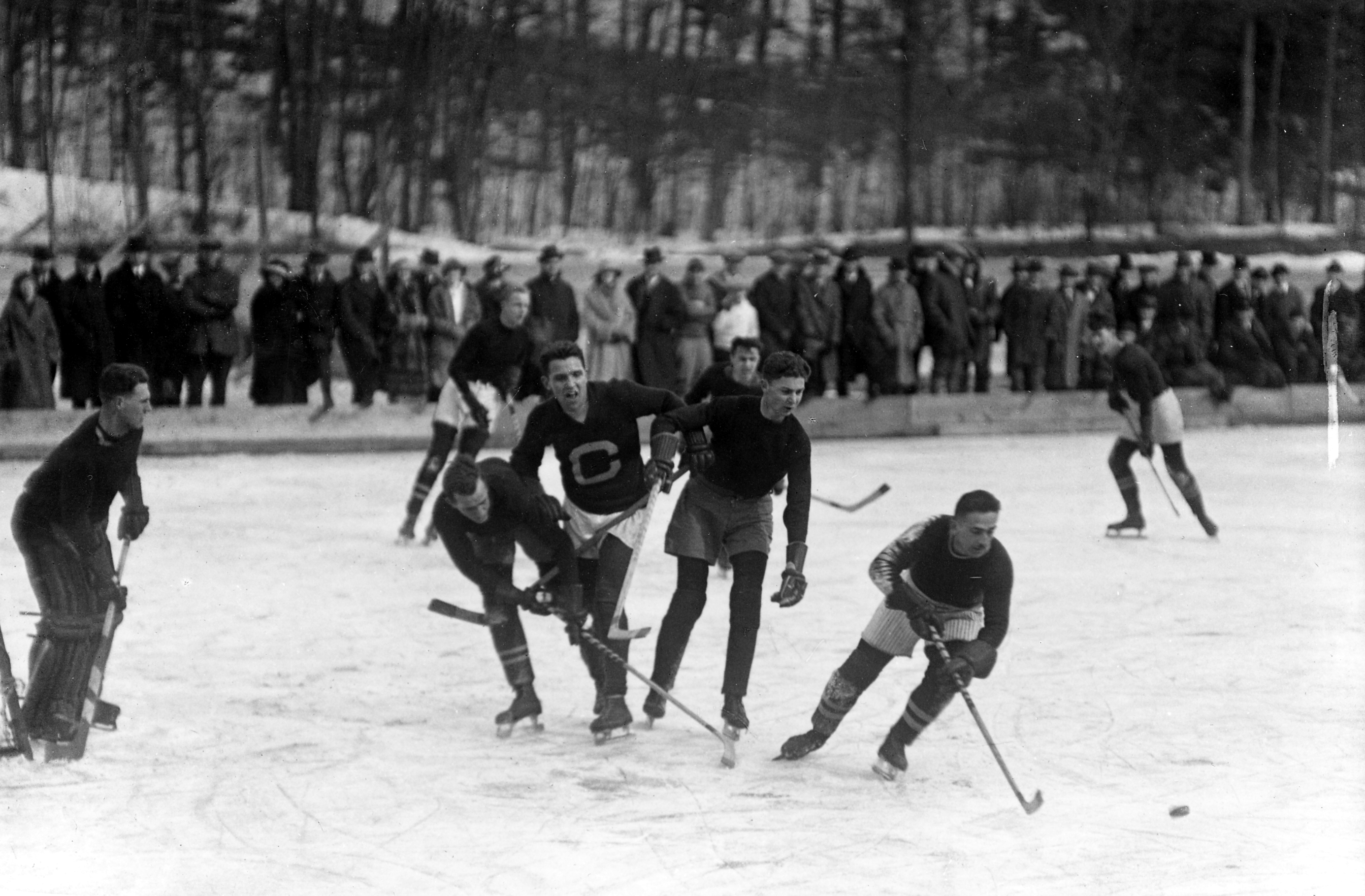
1922 game on Beebe Lake

Cornell's history with ice hockey began at the close of the 19th century, with the first organized game being played in March 1900 against the University of Buffalo. Cornell was embarrassed in their first appearance, losing 1–10, but that did not dissuade the school from pressing forward. The next year in Philadelphia, the ice hockey squad played a total of three games over a four-day period, winning each contest. That weekend Cornell employed G. A. Smith as the team's coach, but for the next eight years the club would go without. That was perhaps just as well, as Cornell played four games over a three-year period, with each match being held at the St. Nicholas Rink in New York City, and was then mothballed for two years. The newly rechristened Big Red returned in February 1907, playing a two-game set on campus for the first time. With no indoor or even artificial facility available, all home games were played on Beebe Lake. This ended up being a rather poor arrangement since the ice hockey team would have to rely on good weather for their games until the second half of the century.

In 1909 Talbot Hunter arrived to be the first full-time head coach for the Big Red, and led the team to a perfect 10–0 record in 1910–11, with none of the games played in Ithaca. Talbot would leave after 1912, but after one win in two seasons he returned as joint ice hockey, lacrosse and soccer coach, heading the squads for two years before moving on. 1916 was also the last year for the ice hockey team as it was shut down due to World War I and lack of available facilities. Up to 1916 Cornell had only played six games at their "home" rink, and the team would not return to the ice until 1921. When they did, their new head coach was former NHA-er Nick Bawlf, who would lead the program until 1947.

Cornell would play as much as it was able over the next 27 years, frequently eschewing Beebe Lake when it was not cold enough to skate on safely. After 1931, Cornell could manage no more than two home games each season, but the university continued to support the program. Cornell was one of the few teams to continue playing throughout the duration of World War II but after Bawlf died in the summer of 1947 the drive behind keeping the team alive diminished. Cornell would play one more hockey season under Bud Boeringer but after so much difficulty with the weather the program was suspended indefinitely.

=== Return of the program ===
In March 1957 Cornell opened its first on-campus arena, the Lynah Rink. The following winter Cornell restarted its ice hockey program with a convincing 16–3 win over the Lehigh club team. While the Big Red wouldn't win many more games over the succeeding three seasons head coach Paul Patten slowly rebuilt the program until it was a respectable squad. Cornell was one of 28 schools who were founding members of ECAC Hockey in 1961 and commemorated the occasion by posting their first winning season since returning. The Big Red finished eighth in the conference but weren't ranked highly enough to receive a bid into the 8-team postseason tournament.

Patten resigned in 1963 and was replaced by former Rensselaer head coach Ned Harkness. That move was a major turning point in the history of the program. Within two seasons Harkness turned the Big Red into a powerhouse, leading them to a 19–7 record, their first of 11 consecutive .700+ records. though they lost their first playoff game to Brown they improved to 22–5 the next year and reached the ECAC championship game. Cornell received the second eastern bid for finishing as the conference runner-up but because of a disagreement between the NCAA and the Ivy League over postseason participation Cornell declined the invitation.

=== Championship years ===
In November 1966 the Cornell faithful were able to get their first taste of Ken Dryden, a goaltender who had made waves on the freshman team the year before, and were overjoyed when the Big Red got off to an 11–0 start. A big game was held between the nation's top two teams on December 30 when Cornell met Boston University in the championship game of the Boston Arena Christmas Tournament. The two teams fought to a 3–3 tie through regulation and continued to battle on into the night. After two extra periods neither Dryden nor his counterpart had relinquished another goal and the head coaches for both squads agreed to declare the game a draw with both teams claiming the championship. The following weekend senior David Quarrie was in net for Cornell's first defeat of the season but the 3–4 home loss to Yale lit a fire under the Big Red. Cornell would not lose another game at the Lynah Rink until February 1972, setting a record that stands today of 63 consecutive home wins. The Big Red, led by Dryden, Mike Doran, Harry Orr and Doug Ferguson dominated their competition the rest of the year, surrendering only 12 goals in the next 11 games (all victories) finishing the regular season with a 22–1–1 record. The Big Red were not, however, able to claim the ECAC title as Boston University had finished with a 19–0–1 record in conference play. Cornell turned its second-place finish into an 11–2 trouncing of Brown in the quarterfinals followed up by demolishing third-place Boston College 12–2 in the semifinal. The Big Red met BU in the ECAC championship game for their much-awaited rematch but this time no overtime was needed as Cornell took the title 4–3.

Despite the championship win Boston University received the top eastern seed and were able to play 15–14–1 Michigan State while Cornell was forced to take on the best team in the west, North Dakota. Cornell was able to defeat the powerful but low-scoring Fighting Sioux in a nail-biter, winning 1–0 before meeting Boston University for the third time in the championship game. Cornell got off to a quick start, scoring less than two minutes into the game, and never looked back, taking their first national title by a score of 4–1. Aside from it being the first championship for the Big Red, it was the first crown for any eastern squad since head coach Ned Harkness won his championship with Rensselaer in 1954.

Ken Dryden would continue to post gaudy records for the Big Red for the next two seasons, winning both the ECAC regular season and tournament championships both years, but faltered in the NCAA tournament, finishing third and second, respectively. Dryden left the school with an astonishing 76–4–1 career record, setting a host of new NCAA records including for career wins, save percentage (.939) and goals against average (1.59). While most of his records have since been broken, his career winning percentage of .944 will likely remain untouched.

When Dryden graduated in 1969, leaving Cornell without the best player in program history, the Big Red were expected to take a step back but team captains Dick Bertrand, Dan Lodboa and John Hughes weren't about to let that happen. After an early-season scare against Brown the team ran through the competition, going 24–0 in the regular season, outscoring opponents 156–43. After eviscerating St. Lawrence 8–1 in the quarterfinals Cornell finally got some pushback with a close 6–5 win over Harvard in the semifinals. In the championship game the Big Red faced off against Clarkson for the first time that season with the Golden Knights top goaltender Bruce Bullock being seen as the only thing that could stop the Big Red from continuing their undefeated season. While Bullock did his job the rest of the Clarkson team couldn't and Cornell claimed its fourth consecutive ECAC tournament championship (a record they hold with Boston University).

In the NCAA tournament Cornell faced off against Wisconsin for the first time in team history and were stifled by the Badgers, being held to less than three goals for the first time all season. Wisconsin, however, wasn't able to solve the oppressive Big Red defense and Cornell won the game 2–1. In the championship match Cornell was again set against Clarkson and the Golden Knights got an early jump with a goal 20 seconds into the contest. The Big Red built a 2–1 lead before Clarkson tied the game late in the first period then retook the advantage by the midpoint of the second period. Cornell knotted the score just over four minutes later and sent the game into the third tied at 3-all. In the final frame the offensive onslaught from Cornell finally broke down Clarkson and Lodboa scored a natural hat trick with a goal at even strength, on the power-play and shorthanded. The stellar individual performance allowed Cornell to win the game 6–4, claim their second national title, and post the first (and only, as of 2025) undefeated and untied championship season in NCAA Division I history.

=== Continuing success ===
After the undefeated season Ned Harkness left the school to take over the Detroit Red Wings, becoming the first college coach to jump directly into the NHL. His successor was named shortly thereafter as Dick Bertrand. When Bertrand took over he hadn't yet graduated and thus became the first undergraduate to be named as head coach of a program in NCAA history. The Big Red hardly lost a step under their new bench boss, going 22–5 in his first season but Cornell faltered in the conference playoffs and finished in fourth place, missing the NCAA tournament for the first time in five years. The team made up for it the following two seasons by winning back-to-back ECAC crowns and reaching the conference title game both times, winning in 1973. The Big Red reached the championship game in 1972 but this time they were no match for Boston University and each of the 39 shots they fired at silver-medalist Tim Regan was turned aside and they lost the match 0–4. They followed up that disappointment by getting their worst tournament result in program history, finishing fourth in 1973. Cornell would continue to produce stellar results for the remainder of the 1970s, posting .700+ records each season except for 1976 (.638) but the team failed to win another regular season crown in any of those years. In addition they lost every ECAC semifinal game they played and were thus left out of the NCAA tournament.

=== Slow decline ===
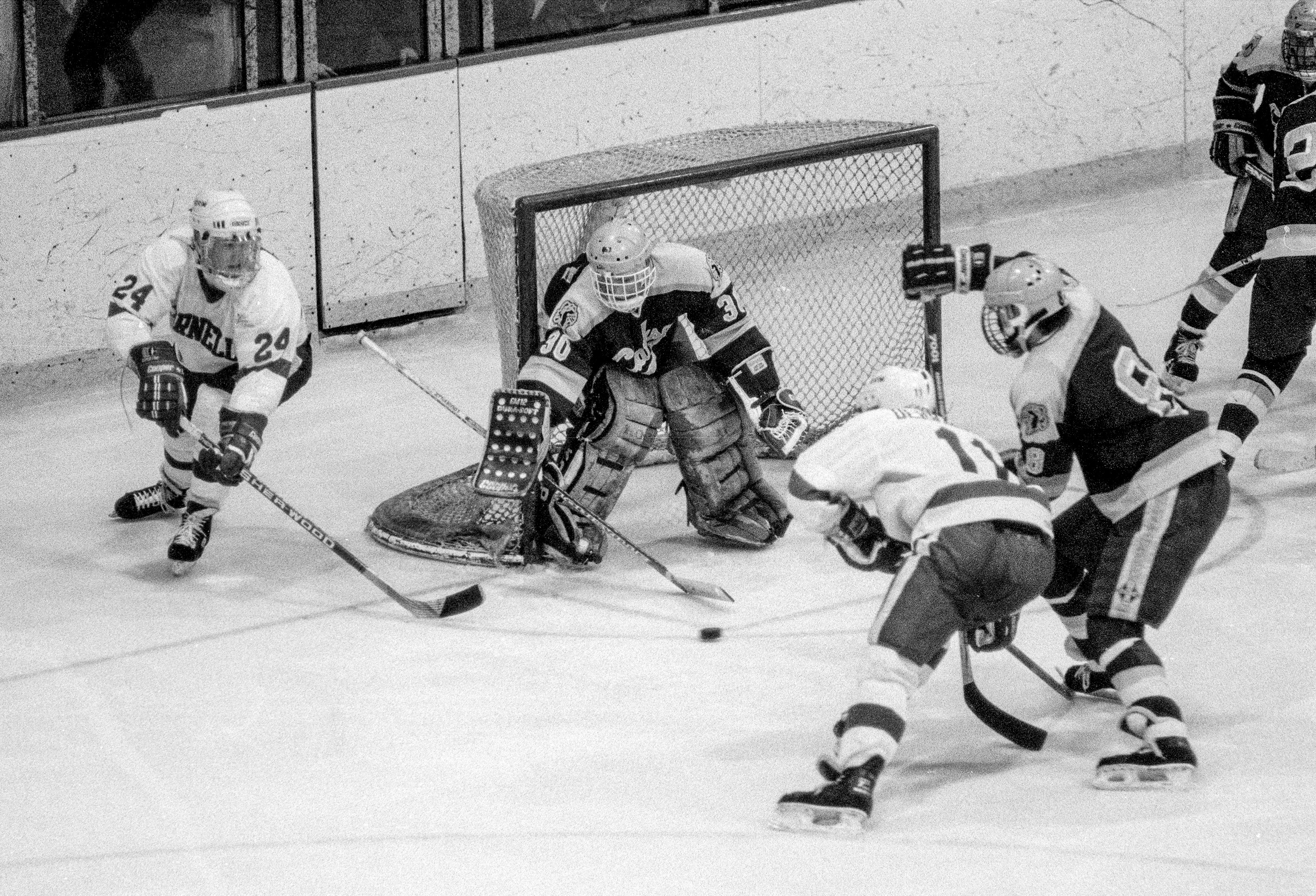
Cornell plays Clarkson in 1987

In 1980 Cornell finished with the worst record since before Ned Harkness arrived, but squeaked into the postseason as the 8th seed. The Big Red went on to a surprise run through the conference tournament, taking the title over Dartmouth and making the NCAA tournament. Despite a strong showing Cornell lost their game against Northern Michigan and once again finished in 4th place. The following season Cornell won the West Region, taking their only ECAC division title, but, more importantly, reached the ECAC title game. Though the NCAA had expanded the tournament to 8 teams for that season and discarded the assumed bids for conference runners-up, Cornell had a strong enough record to warrant a #3 seed and get a rematch against Northern Michigan. The quarterfinal was set as a two-game total-goal series, and when the Wildcats took the first game 7–3 the Big Red were behind the eight ball. Cornell fought back valiantly, winning the second game 4–3 but it wasn't enough to keep them alive in the tournament.

The next season saw Cornell produce a losing record and miss the ECAC playoff for the first time since 1964 soon thereafter Bertrand resigned and turned over head coaching duties to his assistant Lou Reycroft. It took three years before the Big Red returned to the ECAC postseason, doing so the year after 7 teams left to form Hockey East. The year after saw Cornell win 20 games for the first time in seven seasons and win the ECAC title but they were once again bounced in the quarterfinals, losing by 1 goal to Championship-era nemesis Denver. After the team dropped to 9th in the conference the following year and missed the playoffs Reycroft was out and replaced by Brian McCutcheon who had played on the Big Red's 1970 championship team. McCutcheon was able to get Cornell back to a winning record and keep them there for five seasons but could only manage to reach one NCAA tournament and one conference championship game in that time. After that the Big Red declined sharply, tying the team record for most loses in a season (19) in 1993. After two more years of futility McCutcheon was ousted and replaced by another Cornell grad, Mike Schafer.

=== Return to prominence ===
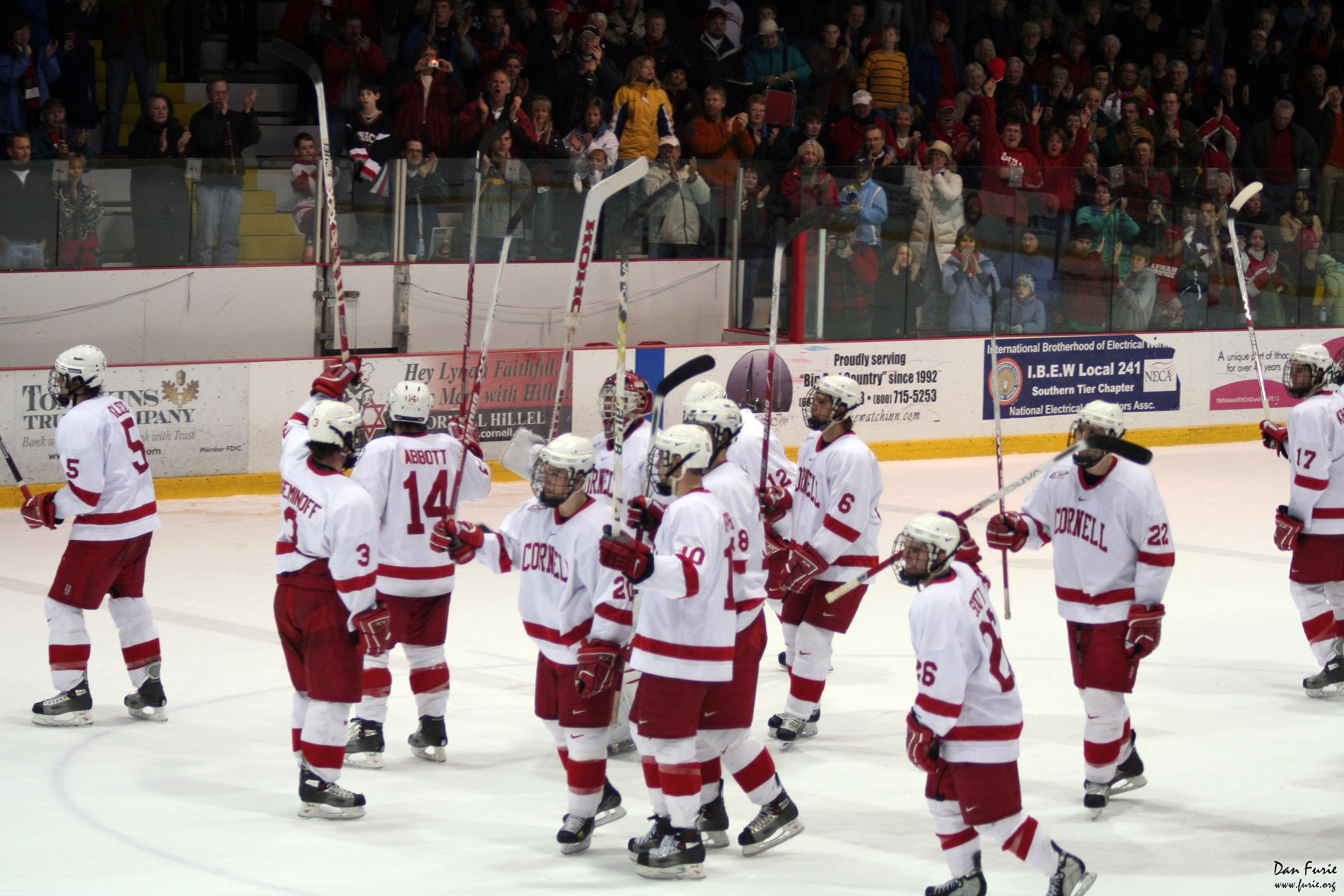
The team saluting fans in Lynah Rink after a game

The Schafer-era began with a bang as Cornell got its first 20-plus-win season in a decade as well as claiming the 1996 ECAC tournament. He followed that up with a second ECAC championship and got Cornell to win its first NCAA tournament round in 25 years. Cornell went through a short lull for the four years after that initial success but won the ECAC regular season title in 2002, their first in 29 years, and the following year posted their most successful season since 1970 by winning the ECAC regular season championship, the conference tournament and reaching their first frozen four since 1980. During that season David LeNeveu broke the 45-year-old NCAA record for lowest single-season goals against average with a 1.20 mark (since broken) as he helped the Big Red post their first 30-win season.

Cornell would continue to produce good results under Schafer for the next several years, winning both conference titles in 2005 with David McKee breaking Ken Dryden's team record for lowest single-season save percentage (.947). The following year the team finished as ECAC tournament runners-up and though they failed to make it out of the regionals they did play in the longest scoreless tie in NCAA history. While Wisconsin outshot, outskated and out-chanced the Big Red all game long McKee kept the Badgers off the board until 5 second remained in the third overtime period, nearly two full games worth of action. After a down year the following season Cornell would finish in the top three in the ECAC championship for five consecutive seasons, winning the title in 2010 but then went into a four-year slump where their highest finish was 4th place in the conference.

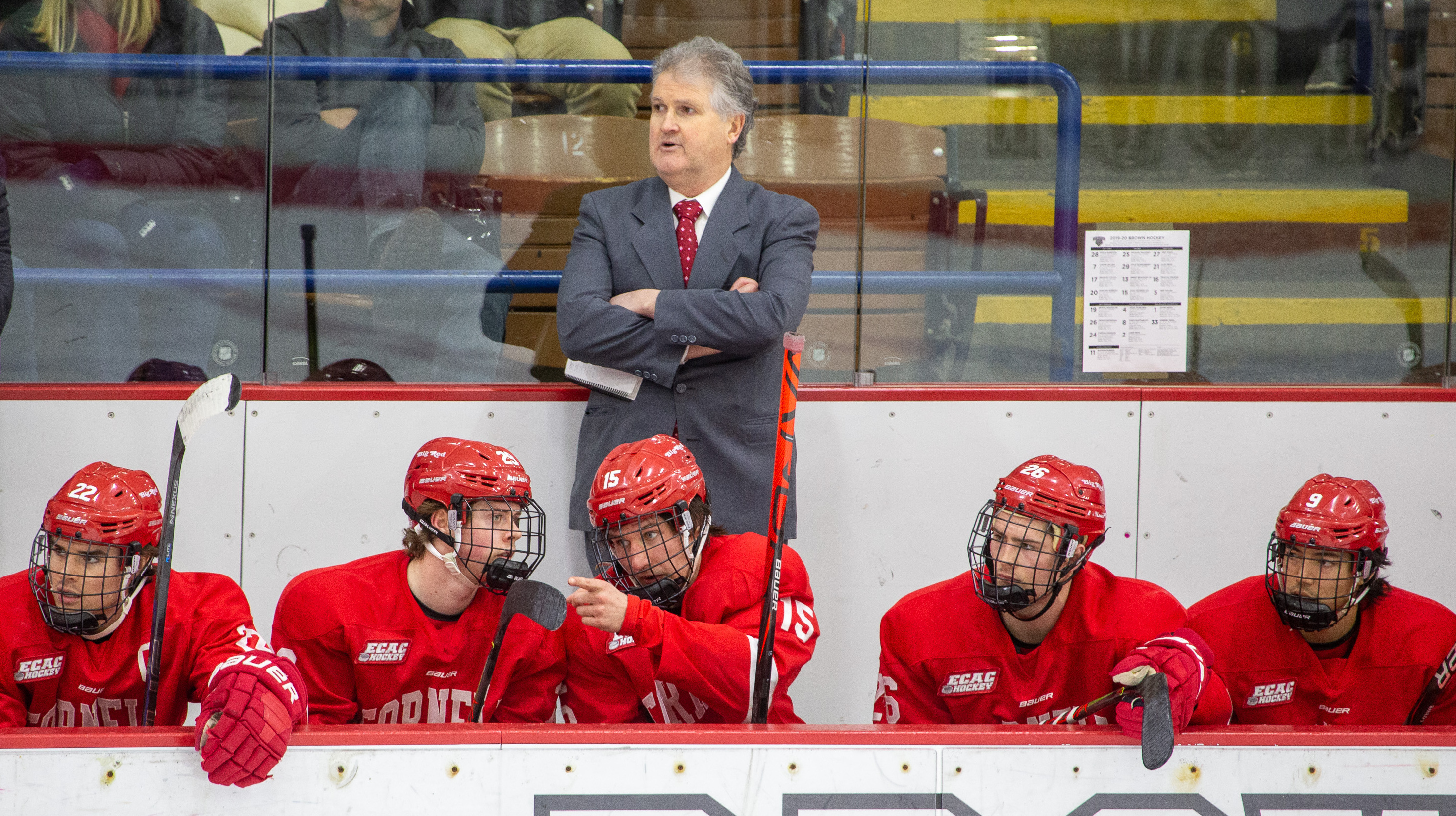
Coach Mike Schafer with members of the #1 ranked 2019–2020 team

In 2017 the team notched 20 wins for the first time since 2010 and finished as conference runners-up. They followed that season up with an ECAC regular season title and while they made the NCAA tournament both years they flamed out in the first round both times.

In 2019–2020 the team finished 23–2–4 and ranked #1 in the nation in the USCHO.com poll. Cornell had the best record in the ECAC Hockey League play and received both the Cleary Cup and the Ivy League title for the third straight year. The 2020 ECAC and NCAA tournaments were cancelled due to the coronavirus pandemic. The team won the Ivy League in both 2022-23 and 2023-24. They followed up their consecutive Ivy League wins with consecutive ECAC tournament victories in 2023-24 and 2024-25, despite the abundance of injuries and slow start in the latter season. They built on those conference titles by reaching the quarterfinals of the NCAA tournament both years. After the conclusion of the 2024-25 season, longtime coach Mike Schafer retired and assistant coach Casey Jones took over the head coaching position.

== Coaches ==
Recent coaches

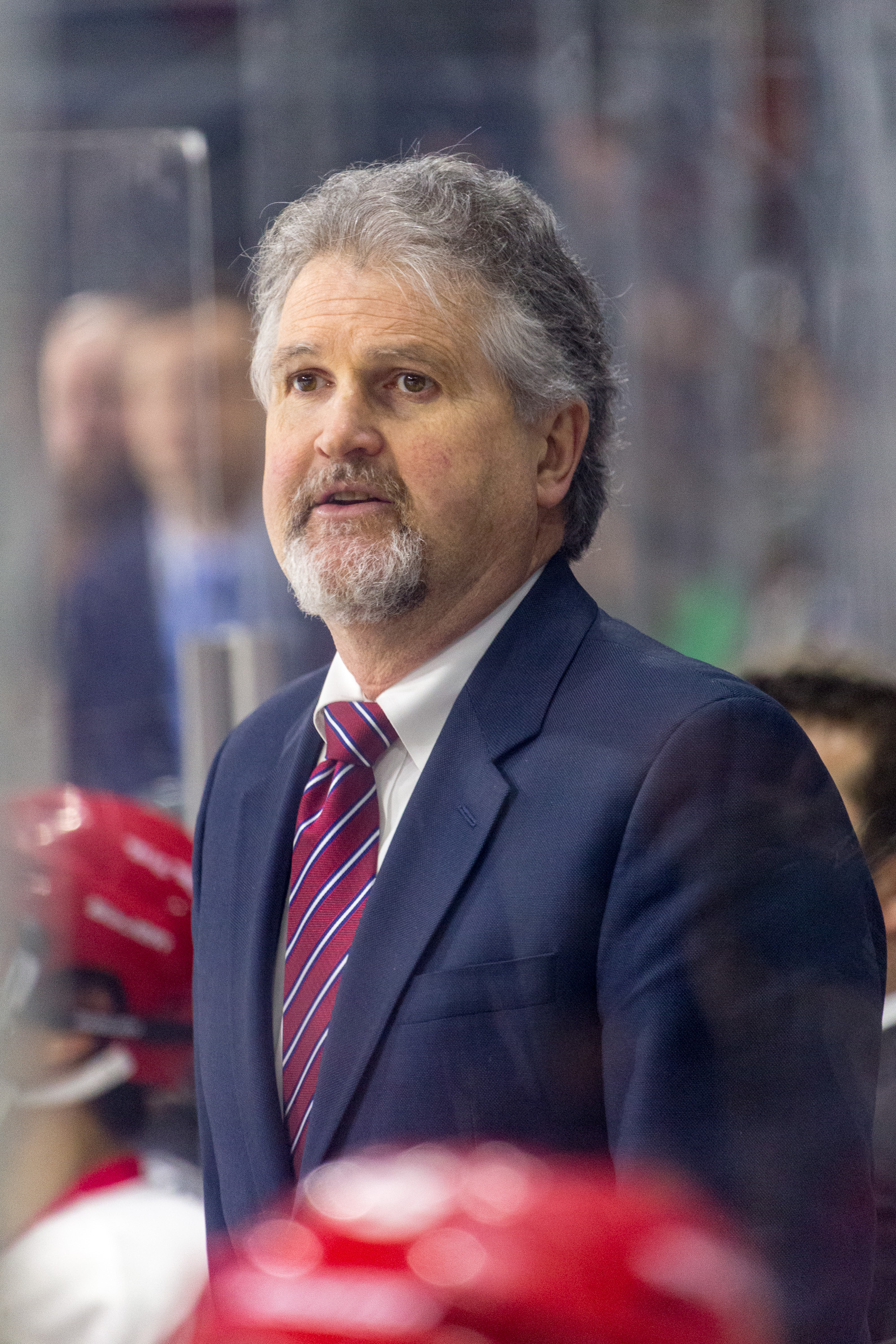
Mike Schafer (1995–2025)

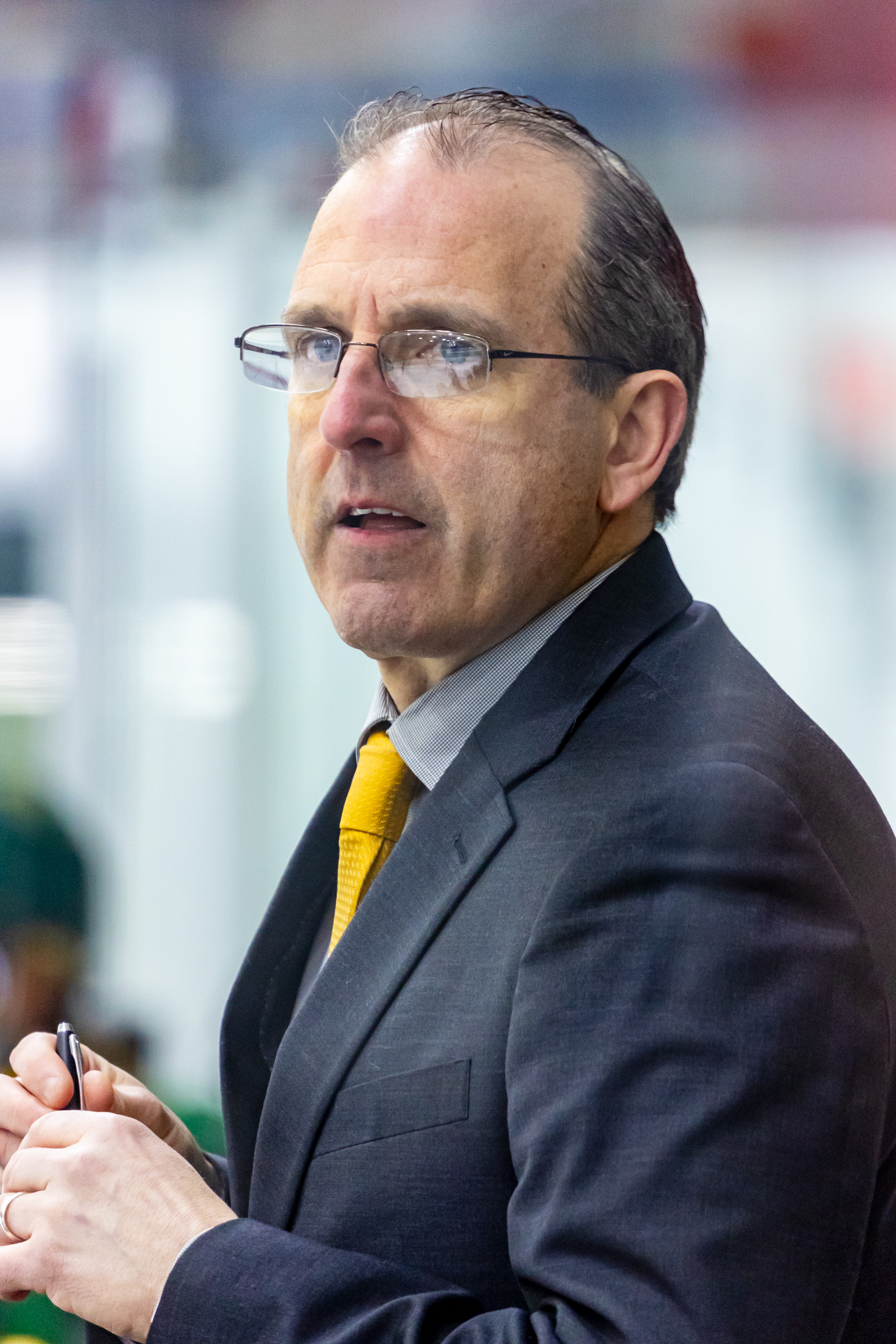
Casey Jones (2025–Present)

As of the start of the 2026–27 season

Tenure	Coach	Years	Record	Pct.
1899–1900	No Coach	1	0–1–0	.000
1900–1901	G. A. Smith	1	3–0–0	1.000
1901–1904, 1906–1909	No Coach	6	9–7–1	.559
1909–1912, 1914–1916	Talbot Hunter	5	18–15–0	.545
1912–1913	Edmund Magner	1	0–7–0	.000
1913–1914	E. J. Sawyer	1	1–4–0	.200
1920–1931, 1933–1947	Nick Bawlf	25	45–76–4	.376
1947–1948	Bud Boeringer	1	0–4–0	.000
1957–1963	Paul Patten	6	38–68–3	.362
1963–1970	Ned Harkness	7	163–27–2	.854
1970–1982	Dick Bertrand	12	230–103–9	.686
1982–1987	Lou Reycroft	5	74–58–9	.557
1987–1995	Brian McCutcheon	8	108–105–21	.506
1995–2025	Mike Schafer	29	561–300–117	.633
2025–present	Casey Jones	1	22–11–1	.662
Totals	13 coaches	109 seasons	1,272–786–167	.609

== Awards and honors ==
=== Hockey Hall of Fame ===
- Ken Dryden (1983)
- Joe Nieuwendyk (2011)

=== US Hockey Hall of Fame ===
- Ned Harkness (1994)

=== NCAA ===
==== Individual awards ====
Spencer Penrose Award

- Ned Harkness: 1968
- Mike Schafer: 2020 (co-winner)

NCAA Division I Ice Hockey Scoring Champion

- Doug Ferguson, C: 1966

Tournament Most Outstanding Player

- Skip Stanowski, D: 1967
- Dan Lodboa, D: 1970

==== All-Americans ====
First Team

- 1965–66: Doug Ferguson, D
- 1966–67: Ken Dryden, D; Harry Orr, D; Doug Ferguson, F
- 1967–68: Ken Dryden, D; Bruce Pattison, D; Skip Stanowski, D; Brian Cornell, F
- 1968–69: Ken Dryden, D; Bruce Pattison, D; Brian Cornell, F; Peter Tufford, F
- 1969–70: Dan Lodboa, D
- 1970–71: Kevin Pettit, F
- 1971–72: Larry Fullan, F
- 1973–74: George Kuzmicz, D
- 1977–78: Peter Shier, D; Lance Nethery, F
- 1978–79: Lance Nethery, F
- 1981–82: Brian Hayward, G
- 1982–83: Darren Eliot, G
- 1985–86: Doug Dadswell, G; Joe Nieuwendyk, F
- 1986–87: Joe Nieuwendyk, F
- 1990–91: Dan Ratushny, D
- 1991–92: Parris Duffus, G
- 2001–02: Matt Underhill, G; Douglas Murray, D
- 2002–03: David LeNeveu, G; Douglas Murray, D
- 2004–05: David McKee, G
- 2009–10: Ben Scrivens, G; Brendon Nash, D
- 2017–18: Matthew Galajda, G
- 2019–20: Morgan Barron, F

Second Team

- 1989–90: Dan Ratushny, D
- 2002–03: Stephen Baby, F
- 2004–05: Charlie Cook, D; Matt Moulson, F
- 2019–20: Yanni Kaldis, D
- 2022–23: Sam Malinski, D
- 2023–24: Ian Shane, G

=== ECAC Hockey ===
==== Individual awards ====
ECAC Hockey Player of the Year

- Doug Ferguson, D: 1966–67
- Ken Dryden: 1968–69
- Lance Nethery: 1977–78
- Joe Nieuwendyk: 1986–87
- David LeNeveu: 2002–03
- David McKee: 2004–05
- Morgan Barron: 2019–20

ECAC Hockey Rookie of the Year

- Doug Ferguson: 1964–65
- Joe Nieuwendyk: 1984–85
- Trent Andison: 1987–88
- Kent Manderville: 1989–90
- Kyle Knopp: 1995–96
- David McKee: 2003–04
- Riley Nash: 2007–08
- Brian Ferlin: 2011–12
- Matthew Galajda: 2017–18

ECAC Hockey Best Defensive Forward

- Brad Chartrand: 1995–96
- Doug Stienstra: 1999–00
- Stephen Baby: 2001–02, 2002–03
- Tyler Mugford: 2008–09
- Greg Miller: 2012–13
- Cole Bardreau: 2014–15
- Jake Weidner: 2016–17
- Jonathan Castagna: 2025–26

Tim Taylor Award

- Mike Schafer (5): 2002, 2003, 2005, 2018, 2020

ECAC Hockey Student-Athlete of the Year

- Colin Greening: 2009–10
- Keir Ross: 2011–12
- Andy Iles: 2013–14
- Kyle Betts: 2020–21
- Gabriel Seger: 2023–24

ECAC Hockey Outstanding Defenseman

- Harry Orr: 1966–67

ECAC Hockey Best Defensive Defenseman

- Jeff Burgoyne: 1997–98
- Brian McMeekin: 2001–02
- Douglas Murray: 2002–03
- Justin Krueger: 2009–10
- Alec McCrea: 2017–18
- Matt Nuttle: 2018–19
- Alex Green: 2019–20

Ken Dryden Award

- Matt Underhill: 2001–02
- David LeNeveu: 2002–03
- David McKee: 2004–05
- Ben Scrivens: 2009–10
- Matthew Galajda: 2017–18
- Ian Shane: 2023–24
- Alexis Cournoyer: 2025–26

ECAC Hockey Most Outstanding Player in Tournament

- Doug Ferguson: 1967
- Ken Dryden: 1968, 1969
- Carlo Ugolini: 1973
- Darren Eliot: 1980
- Doug Dadswell: 1986
- Jason Elliott: 1996, 1997
- David LeNeveu: 2003
- Charlie Cook: 2005
- Ben Scrivens: 2010
- Jonathan Castagna: 2024
- Ian Shane: 2025

==== All-Conference ====
First Team All-ECAC Hockey

- 1965–66: Harry Orr, D; Doug Ferguson, F
- 1966–67: Ken Dryden, G; Harry Orr, D; Doug Ferguson, F
- 1967–68: Ken Dryden, G; Skip Stanowski, D; Bruce Pattison, D; Peter Tufford, F
- 1968–69: Ken Dryden, G; Bruce Pattison, D; Brian Cornell, F
- 1969–70: Brian Cropper, G; Dan Lodboa, D
- 1971–72: Larry Fullan, F
- 1972–73: Carlo Ugolini, F
- 1973–74: George Kuzmicz, D
- 1977–78: Peter Shier, D; Lance Nethery, F
- 1978–79: Lance Nethery, F
- 1981–82: Brian Hayward, G
- 1982–83: Darren Eliot, G
- 1985–86: Joe Nieuwendyk, F
- 1986–87: Joe Nieuwendyk, F
- 1989–90: Dan Ratushny, D
- 1990–91: Dan Ratushny, D
- 1995–96: Steve Wilson, D
- 1996–97: Steve Wilson, D
- 1998–99: Jeff Burgoyne, D
- 2001–02: Matt Underhill, G; Douglas Murray, D
- 2002–03: David LeNeveu, G; Douglas Murray, D
- 2004–05: David McKee, G; Matt Moulson, F
- 2008–09: Riley Nash, F
- 2009–10: Ben Scrivens, G; Brendon Nash, F
- 2014–15: Joakim Ryan, D
- 2017–18: Matthew Galajda, G
- 2018–19: Morgan Barron, F
- 2019–20: Yanni Kaldis, D; Morgan Barron, F
- 2021–22: Sam Malinski, D
- 2022–23: Sam Malinski, D
- 2023–24: Ian Shane, G; Gabriel Seger, F
- 2025–26: Alexis Cournoyer, G; Jonathan Castagna, F

Second Team All-ECAC Hockey

- 1961–62: Laing Kennedy, G
- 1962–63: Laing Kennedy, G
- 1964–65: Doug Ferguson, F
- 1965–66: Mike Doran, F
- 1966–67: Mike Doran, F
- 1967–68: Brian Cornell, F
- 1968–69: Peter Tufford, F
- 1969–70: John Hughes, F
- 1970–71: Brian Cropper, G; Brian McCutcheon, F; Kevin Pettit, F
- 1971–72: Jim Higgs, D
- 1972–73: Bill Murray, D
- 1974–75: Dave Peace, F
- 1976–77: Lance Nethery, F
- 1978–79: Brock Tredway, F
- 1984–85: Duanne Moeser, F; Peter Natyshak, F
- 1985–86: Doug Dadswell, G; Chris Norton, D
- 1987–88: Chris Norton, D
- 1991–92: Parris Duffus, G
- 1997–98: Jason Elliott, G
- 2001–02: Mark McRae, D; Stephen Baby, F
- 2002–03: Ryan Vesce, F; Stephen Baby, F
- 2004–05: Charlie Cook, D
- 2005–06: Matt Moulson, F
- 2007–08: Colin Greening, F
- 2008–09: Ben Scrivens, G; Brendon Nash, D; Colin Greening, F
- 2009–10: Colin Greening, F
- 2010–11: Joe Devin, F
- 2011–12: Andy Iles, G; Nick D'Agostino, D
- 2013–14: Andy Iles, G; Joakim Ryan, D
- 2018–19: Yanni Kaldis, D
- 2021–22: Matt Stienburg, F
- 2023–24: Dalton Bancroft, F
- 2025–26: Xavier Veilleux, D

Third Team All-ECAC Hockey

- 2005–06: Ryan O'Byrne, D
- 2006–07: Byron Bitz, F
- 2009–10: Riley Nash, D
- 2010–11: Mike Devin, D
- 2012–13: Greg Miller, F
- 2013–14: Brian Ferlin, F
- 2014–15: Cole Bardreau, F
- 2015–16: Joakim Ryan, D
- 2017–18: Yanni Kaldis, D
- 2018–19: Matthew Galajda, G; Cam Donaldson, F
- 2019–20: Matthew Galajda, G; Alex Green, D
- 2021–22: Max Andreev, F
- 2023–24: Ben Robertson, D
- 2024–25: Tim Rego, D

ECAC Hockey All-Rookie Team

- 1987–88: Corrie D'Alessio, G; Trent Andison, F
- 1988–89: Dan Ratushny, D
- 1989–90: Ryan Hughes, F; Kent Manderville, F
- 1993–94: Steve Wilson, D; Vince Auger, F
- 1994–95: Ryan Smart, F
- 1995–96: Kyle Knopp, F
- 1996–97: Ryan Moynihan, F
- 1998–99: Denis Ladouceur, F
- 1999–00: Mark McRae, D; Matt McRae, F
- 2001–02: David LeNeveu, G
- 2003–04: David McKee, G
- 2004–05: Sasha Pokulok, D
- 2006–07: Brendon Nash, D
- 2007–08: Mike Devin, D; Riley Nash, F
- 2008–09: Keir Ross, D
- 2009–10: Nick D'Agostino, D
- 2010–11: Andy Iles, G
- 2011–12: Brian Ferlin, F
- 2016–17: Yanni Kaldis, D
- 2017–18: Matthew Galajda, G
- 2021–22: Hank Kempf, D
- 2023–24: Ben Robertson, D; Jonathan Castagna, F
- 2025–26: Alexis Cournoyer, G; Xavier Veilleux, D

== Retired numbers ==
Ken; Dryden; Goaltender; Retired February 25, 2010	Joe; Nieuwendyk; Forward; Retired February 25, 2010

Cornell hockey began the practice of retiring numbers on February 25, 2010. The Big Red retired the numbers of Ken Dryden, who played 1965–69, and Joe Nieuwendyk, who played 1984–87.

== Olympians ==
This is a list of Cornell alumni who have played on an Olympic team.

Name	Position	Cornell Tenure	Team	Year	Finish
Darren Eliot	Goaltender	1979–1983	Canada	1984	4th
Joe Nieuwendyk	Center	1984–1987	Canada	1998, 2002	4th, Gold
Dan Ratushny	Defenseman	1988–1991	Canada	1992	Silver
Kent Manderville	Center	1989–1991	Canada	1992	Silver
Ben Scrivens	Goaltender	2006–2010	Canada	2018	Bronze

== Cornell Athletic Hall of Fame ==
The following is a list of people associated with the Cornell men's ice hockey program who were elected into the Cornell Athletic Hall of Fame (induction date in parentheses).

- Stephen Baby (2014)
- Nick Bawlf (1980)
- Dick Bertrand (1989)
- Brian Cornell (1982)
- Brian Cropper (1985)
- Doug Dadswell (2000)
- Mike Doran (1998)
- Ken Dryden (1978)
- William Duthie (2009)
- Darren Eliot (1996)
- Jason Elliott (2009)
- Doug Ferguson (1979)
- Larry Fullan (1997)
- Colin Greening (2020)
- Ned Harkness (1981)
- Brian Hayward (1991)
- John Hughes (1981)
- Frank Hunter (1979)
- Laing Kennedy (1980)
- Roy Kerling (1999)
- Dan Lodboa (1978)
- Brian McCutcheon (1986)
- Duane Moeser (2003)
- Matt Moulson (2016)
- Bill Murray (1988)
- Douglas Murray (2013)
- Lance Nethery (1984)
- Joe Nieuwendyk (1994)
- Harry Orr (1984)
- Bruce Pattison (1983)
- Dan Ratushny (2018)
- Bob Rule (1986)
- Mike Schafer (2025)
- Ben Scrivens (2023)
- Peter Shier (1990)
- Skip Stanowski (2001)
- Mike Teeter (2005)
- Brock Tredway (1989)
- Peter Tufford (1978)
- Matt Underhill (2012)
- James Vaughan (2007)
- Bob Wiggans (1986)
- Steve Wilson (2010)

== Championships ==
- NCAA champions: 1967, 1970
- NCAA runners-up: 1969, 1972
- ECAC Champions (14): 1967, 1968, 1969, 1970, 1973, 1980, 1986, 1996, 1997, 2003, 2005, 2010, 2024, 2025
- ECAC regular season champions (11): 1968, 1969, 1970, 1972, 1973*, 2002, 2003, 2005, 2018, 2019*, 2020
- Ivy League Champions (27): 1966, 1967, 1968, 1969, 1970, 1971, 1972, 1973, 1977, 1978, 1983*, 1984*, 1985*, 1996, 1997, 2002, 2003, 2004*, 2005, 2012, 2014, 2018, 2019, 2020, 2023, 2024, 2026
- ECAC Christmas Hockey Tournament: 1966, 1968, 1970
- Ned Harkness Cup: 2003, 2005, 2008, 2013

* indicates shared title

== Statistical leaders ==
=== Career points leaders ===
Player	Years	GP	G	A	Pts	PIM
Lance Nethery	1975–1979	111	91	180	271	
Brock Tredway	1977–1981	113	113	94	207	
Roy Kerling	1977–1982	100	93	107	200	
Doug Ferguson	1964–1967	82	91	96	187	
Duanne Moeser	1982–1986	106	81	96	177	
Larry Fullan	1969–1972	85	57	108	165	
Peter Tufford	1966–1969	86	68	92	160	
Gary Cullen	1981–1985	103	54	105	159	
James Vaughan	1974–1977	82	71	83	154	
Doug Derraugh	1987–1991	119	66	87	153	

=== Career goaltending leaders ===
GP = Games played; Min = Minutes played; W = Wins; L = Losses; T = Ties; GA = Goals against; SO = Shutouts; SV% = Save percentage; GAA = Goals against average

Minimum 2,000 minutes

Player	Years	GP	Min	W	L	T	GA	SO	SV%	GAA
David LeNeveu	2001–2003	46	2788	39	5	2	60	11	.938	1.29
Ken Dryden	1966–1969	83	4844	76	4	1	128	13	.939	1.59
Matthew Galajda	2017–2020	86	5053	60	15	9	138	19	.930	1.64
David McKee	2003–2006	102	6193	65	24	13	177	18	.926	1.71
Ian Shane	2021–2025	118	6832	66	32	16	211	14	.917	1.85

Statistics current through the end of the 2025–26 season.

== Current roster ==
As of November 11, 2026.

No.	Nat.	Player	Class	Pos	Height	Weight	DoB	Hometown	Previous team	NHL rights
2	(United States)	Hudson Gorski	Sophomore	D	6' 3" (1.91 m)	190 lb (86 kg)	2005-09-05	Scotch Plains, New Jersey	Chicago Steel (USHL)	—
3	(Canada)	Luke McCrady	Sophomore	D	6' 3" (1.91 m)	192 lb (87 kg)	2005-11-08	Calgary, Alberta	Spruce Grove Saints (BCHL)	—
4	(Canada)	Xavier Veilleux	Sophomore	D	6' 1" (1.85 m)	200 lb (91 kg)	2006-03-23	L'Ancienne-Lorette, Quebec	Muskegon Lumberjacks (USHL)	NYI, 179th overall 2024
5	(Canada)	Ryland Randle	Freshman	D	5' 10" (1.78 m)	172 lb (78 kg)	2006-05-16	Prosper, Texas	Des Moines Buccaneers (USHL)	—
6	(Canada)	George Fegaras (A)	Senior	D	6' 2" (1.88 m)	204 lb (93 kg)	2004-04-26	Richmond Hill, Ontario	Muskegon Lumberjacks (USHL)	DAL, 83rd overall 2022
7	(Russia)	Ivan Zadvernyuk	Junior	F	6' 3" (1.91 m)	208 lb (94 kg)	2004-04-12	Moscow, Russia	Brown University (ECAC)	—
8	(United States)	Luke Devlin (A)	Senior	F	6' 4" (1.93 m)	200 lb (91 kg)	2004-03-12	Memphis, Tennessee	West Kelowna Warriors (BCHL)	PIT, 182nd overall 2022
9	(United States)	Charlie Major	Junior	F	5' 10" (1.78 m)	186 lb (84 kg)	2004-09-14	Skaneateles, New York	Chicago Steel (USHL)	—
10	(United States)	Jake Kraft (A)	Senior	F	5' 8" (1.73 m)	180 lb (82 kg)	2003-04-26	Churchville, New York	Cedar Rapids RoughRiders (USHL)	—
11	(Canada)	Luke Ashton	Junior	D	6' 5" (1.96 m)	230 lb (104 kg)	2005-01-21	North Vancouver, British Columbia	Minnesota State University (CCHA)	CBJ, 165th overall 2024
12	(Canada)	Caton Ryan	Sophomore	F	6' 0" (1.83 m)	189 lb (86 kg)	2006-06-25	Ottawa, Ontario	Penticton Vees (BCHL)	—
13	(United States)	Gio DiGiulian	Sophomore	F	6' 1" (1.85 m)	183 lb (83 kg)	2005-09-25	South Burlington, Vermont	Lincoln Stars (USHL)	—
14	(United States)	Ryan Walsh (C)	Senior	F	6' 1" (1.85 m)	197 lb (89 kg)	2003-08-25	Rochester, New York	Cedar Rapids RoughRiders (USHL)	BOS, 188th overall 2023
15	(United States)	Tyler Catalano (A)	Senior	F	6' 4" (1.93 m)	215 lb (98 kg)	2004-02-26	St. Louis, Missouri	Youngstown Phantoms (USHL)	—
16	(United States)	Michael Fisher	Junior	D	6' 3" (1.91 m)	203 lb (92 kg)	2004-05-02	Westborough, Massachusetts	Penticton Vees (BCHL)	SJS, 76th overall 2022
17	(Canada)	Aiden Long	Sophomore	F	6' 2" (1.88 m)	207 lb (94 kg)	2005-03-13	Mono, Ontario	Madison Capitols (USHL)	—
18	(Canada)	Reegan Hiscock	Sophomore	F	6' 5" (1.96 m)	210 lb (95 kg)	2004-07-02	St. John's, Newfoundland and Labrador	Victoria Grizzlies (BCHL)	—
19	(Canada)	Connor Arseneault	Sophomore	F	6' 2" (1.88 m)	220 lb (100 kg)	2006-03-01	Rothesay, New Brunswick	Chilliwack Chiefs (BCHL)	—
20	(Canada)	Brad Gardiner	Freshman	F	6' 1" (1.85 m)	195 lb (88 kg)	2005-03-06	Aurora, Ontario	Barrie Colts (OHL)	—
21	(United States)	Louie Wehmann	Freshman	F	6' 1" (1.85 m)	218 lb (99 kg)	2006-04-12	Wayzata, Minnesota	Penticton Vees (WHL)	—
22	(United States)	Chase Pirtle	Sophomore	F	6' 2" (1.88 m)	198 lb (90 kg)	2005-03-08	Far Hills, New Jersey	Victoria Grizzlies (BCHL)	—
23	(United States)	Charlie Arend	Freshman	F	6' 1" (1.85 m)	188 lb (85 kg)	2006-01-10	Wilmette, Illinois	Dubuque Fighting Saints (USHL)	—
24	(Canada)	Nicholas Wolfenberg	Junior	D	6' 2" (1.88 m)	204 lb (93 kg)	2004-06-11	Calgary, Alberta	Okotoks Oilers (BCHL)	—
26	(United States)	Donovan Hamilton	Sophomore	D	6' 3" (1.91 m)	203 lb (92 kg)	2005-12-03	Buffalo, New York	Salmon Arm Silverbacks (BCHL)	—
27	(United States)	Cal Hughes	Freshman	F	6' 0" (1.83 m)	182 lb (83 kg)	2006-01-22	Westwood, Massachusetts	Erie Otters (OHL)	—
28	(United States)	Cole Tuminaro	Freshman	D	6' 4" (1.93 m)	220 lb (100 kg)	2007-01-24	Rockton, Illinois	Chicago Steel (USHL)	COL, 140th overall 2026
29	(United States)	Parker Murray	Junior	F	6' 5" (1.96 m)	226 lb (103 kg)	2003-09-26	Manhattan Beach, California	Chilliwack Chiefs (BCHL)	—
36	(Canada)	Coco Armstrong	Freshman	F	6' 0" (1.83 m)	191 lb (87 kg)	2006-05-26	West Vancouver, British Columbia	Spokane Chiefs (WHL)	—
37	(Canada)	Justin Katz	Junior	G	6' 1" (1.85 m)	187 lb (85 kg)	2004-10-28	Montreal, Quebec	Powell River Kings (BCHL)	—
40	(Canada)	Erick Roest	Sophomore	G	6' 0" (1.83 m)	182 lb (83 kg)	2004-10-26	Lethbridge, Alberta	Cowichan Valley Capitals (BCHL)	—
60	(Canada)	Mathis Rousseau	Sophomore	G	5' 11" (1.8 m)	184 lb (83 kg)	2004-09-10	Boisbriand, Quebec	University of Maine (HEA)	—

== Big Red players in the NHL ==
As of July 1, 2026.

= NHL All-Star team	= NHL All-Star	= NHL All-Star and NHL All-Star team	= Hall of Famers

Player	Position	Team(s)	Years	Games	Stanley Cups
Anthony Angello	Center	PIT	2019–2022	31	0
Cole Bardreau	Center	NYI	2019–2023	11	0
Morgan Barron	Center	NYR, WPG	2020–Present	321	0
Byron Bitz	Right Wing	BOS, FLA, VAN	2008–2012	97	0
Brad Chartrand	Right Wing	LAK	1999–2004	215	0
Sean Collins	Center	CBJ, WAS	2012–2016	21	0
Corrie D'Alessio	Goaltender	HFD	1992–1993	1	0
Doug Dadswell	Goaltender	CGY	1986–1990	27	0
P. C. Drouin	Left Wing	BOS	1996–1997	3	0
Ken Dryden	Goaltender	MTL	1970–1979	397	6
Parris Duffus	Goaltender	PHO	1996–1997	1	0
Darren Eliot	Goaltender	LAK, DET, BUF	1984–1989	89	0
Brian Ferlin	Right Wing	BOS	2014–2015	7	0
Larry Fullan	Forward	WAS	1974–1975	4	0
Colin Greening	Center	OTT, TOR	2010–2016	286	0
Brian Hayward	Goaltender	WPG, MTL, MIN, SJS	1982–1993	357	0
Ryan Hughes	Center	BOS	1995–1996	3	0
Mike Iggulden	Center	SJS, NYI	2007–2009	12	0
David LeNeveu	Goaltender	PHO, CBJ	2005–2011	22	0
Jacob MacDonald	Defenseman	FLA, COL, SJS	2018–2024	135	0
Sam Malinski	Defenseman	COL	2023–Present	181	0
Jeff Malott	Left Wing	WPG, LAK	2021–Present	71	0
Kent Manderville	Center	TOR, EDM, HFD, CAR, PHI, PIT	1991–2002	646	0

Player	Position	Team(s)	Years	Games	Stanley Cups
Brian McCutcheon	Forward	DET	1974–1977	37	0
Travis Mitchell	Defenseman	NYI	2025–Present	9	0
Matt Moulson	Left Wing	LAK, NYI, BUF, MIN	2007–2018	650	0
Douglas Murray	Defenseman	SJS, PIT, MTL	2005–2014	518	0
Brendon Nash	Defenseman	MTL	2010–2011	2	0
Riley Nash	Center	CAR, BOS, CBJ, TOR, WPG, TBL, ARI, NYR	2011–2024	628	0
Lance Nethery	Forward	NYR, EDM	1980–1982	41	0
Joe Nieuwendyk	Center	CGY, DAL, NJD, TOR, FLA	1986–2007	1,257	3
Ryan O'Byrne	Defenseman	MTL, COL, TOR	2007–2013	308	0
Jean-Marc Pelletier	Goaltender	PHI, PHO	1998–2004	7	0
Dan Ratushny	Defenseman	VAN	1992–1993	1	0
Joakim Ryan	Defenseman	SJS, LAK, CAR	2017–2021	145	0
Raymond Sawada	Right Wing	DAL	2008–2011	11	0
Ben Scrivens	Goaltender	TOR, LAK, EDM, MTL	2011–2016	144	0
Matthew Stienburg	Center	COL	2024–2025	8	0
Brock Tredway	Wing	LAK	1981–1982	0^{†}	0
Matt Underhill	Goaltender	CHI	2003–2004	1	0
Ryan Vesce	Right Wing	SJS	2008–2010	19	0

† Tredway played in 1 playoff game in 1982.

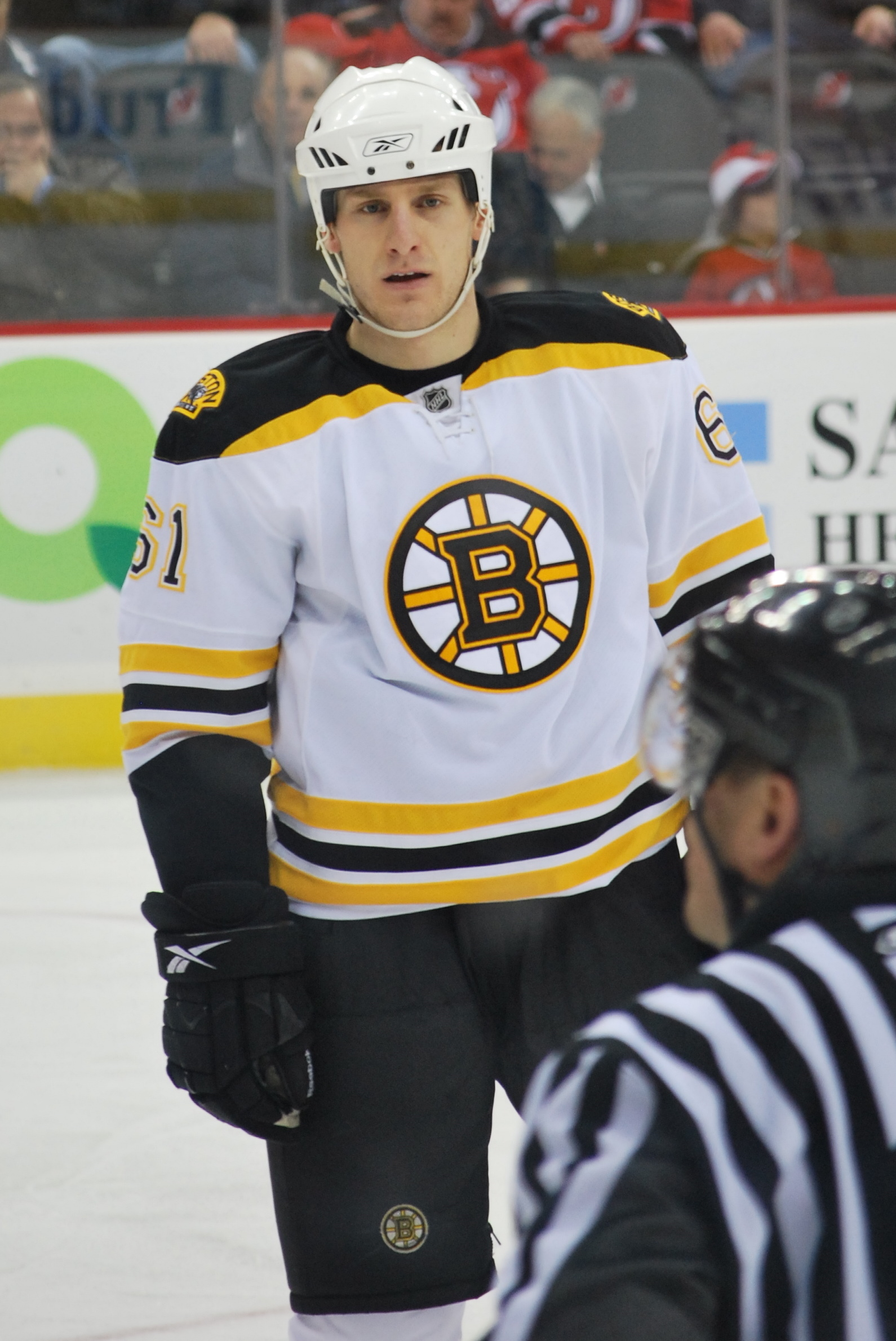
Byron Bitz

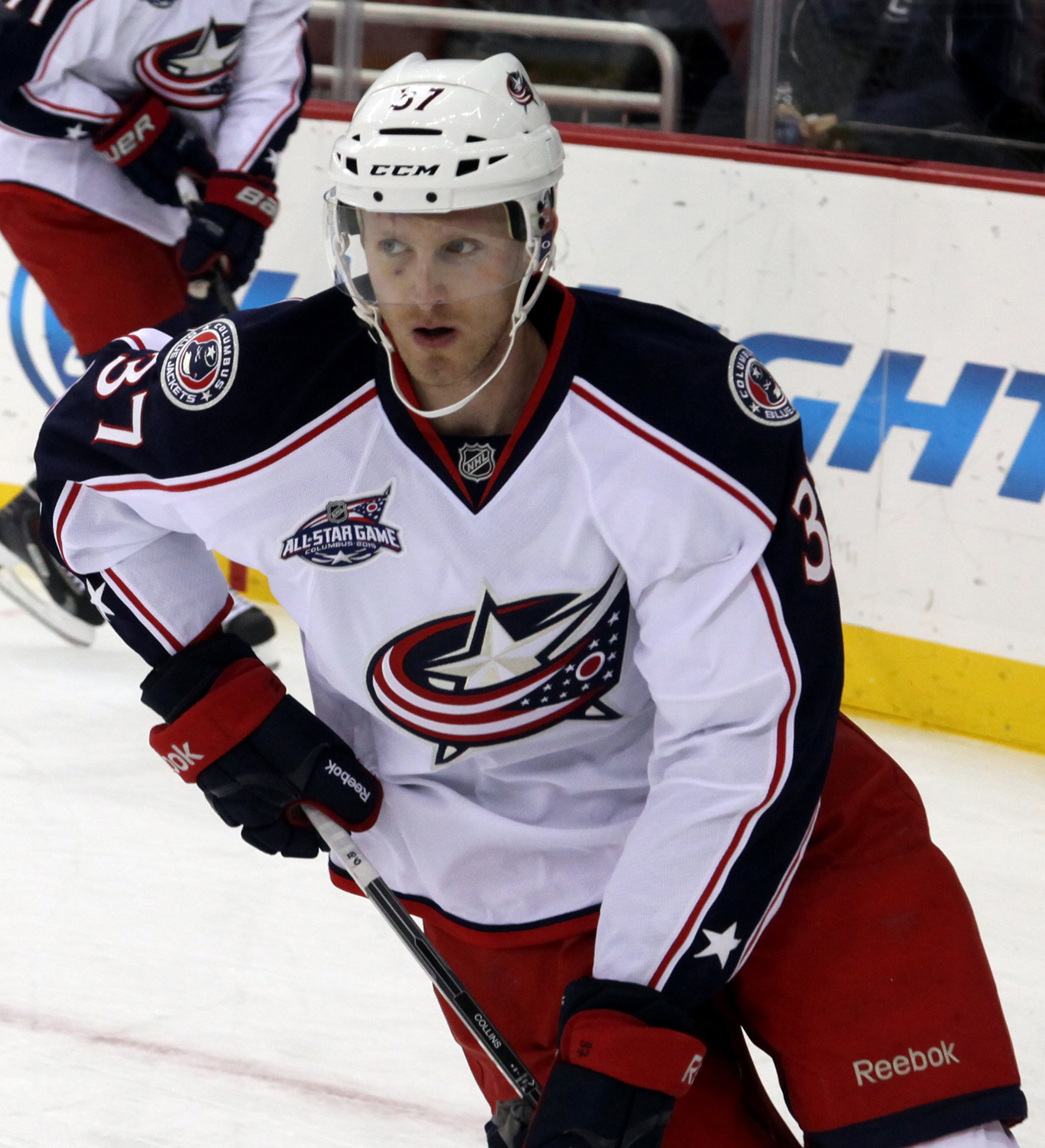
Sean Collins

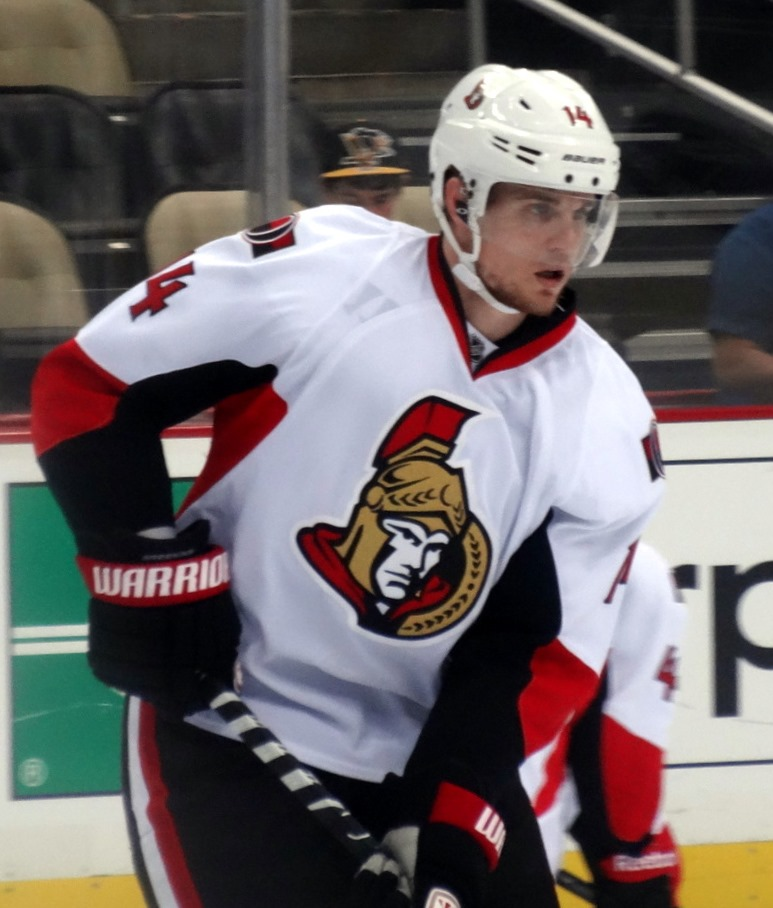
Colin Greening

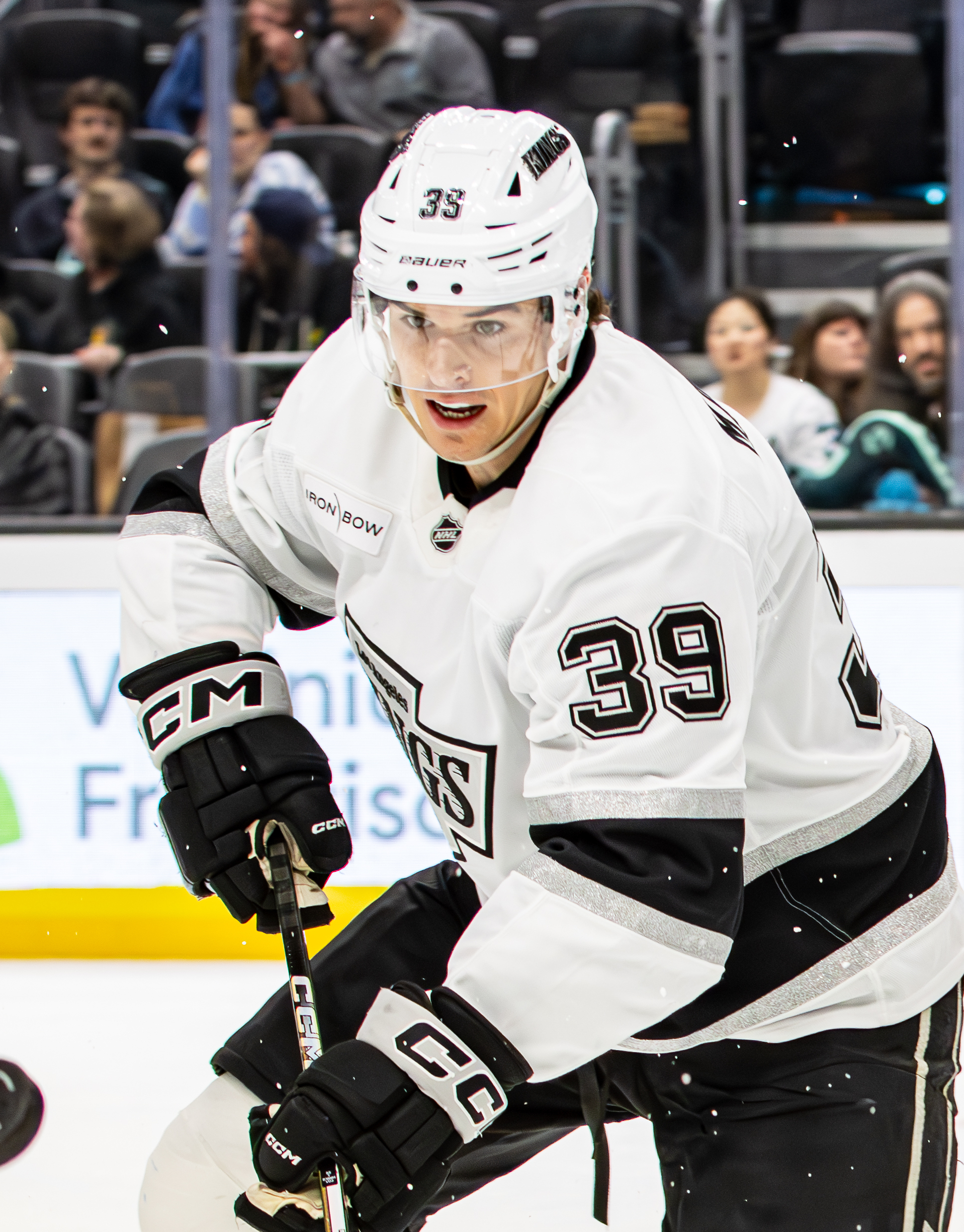
Jeff Malott

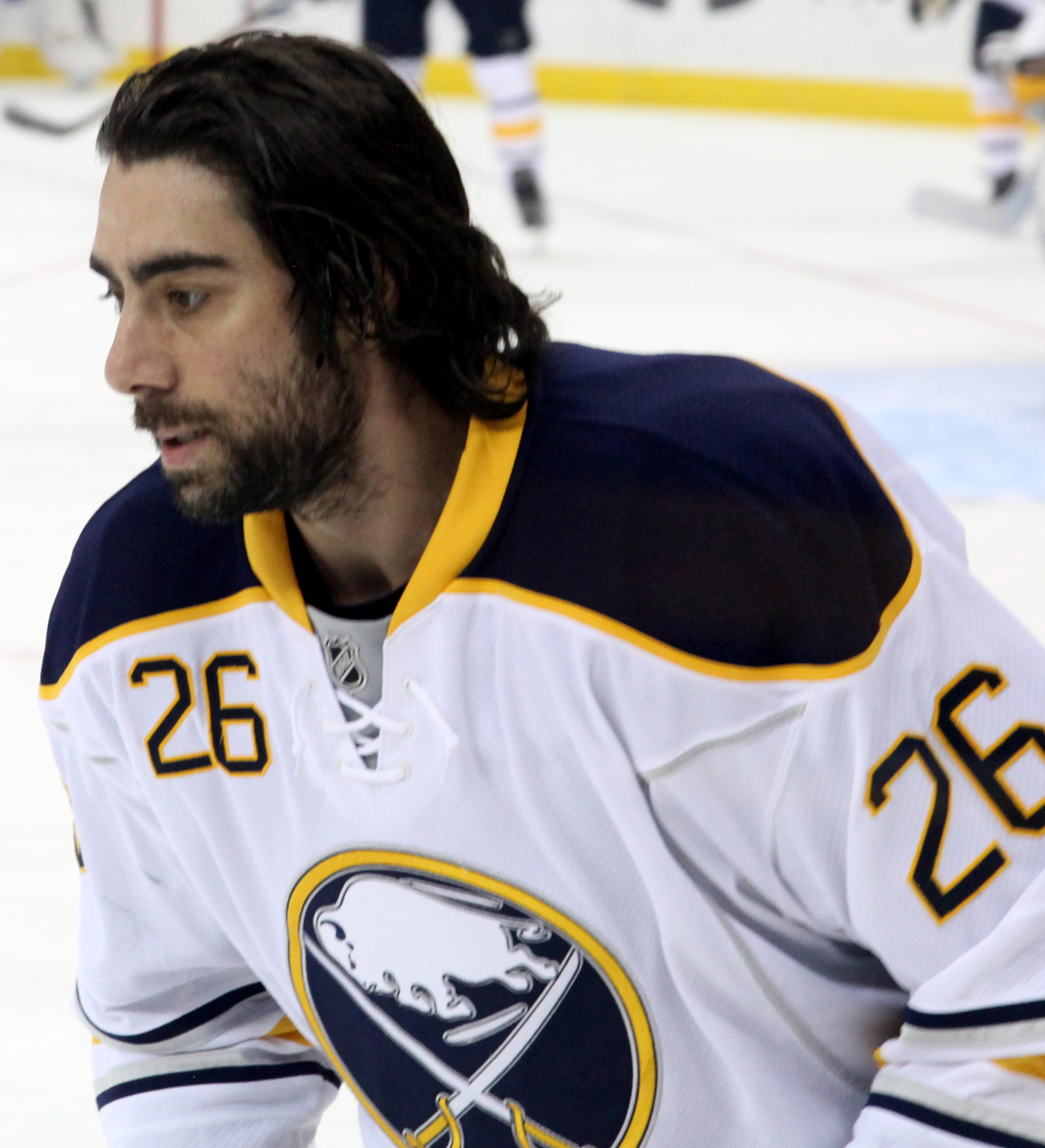
Matt Moulson

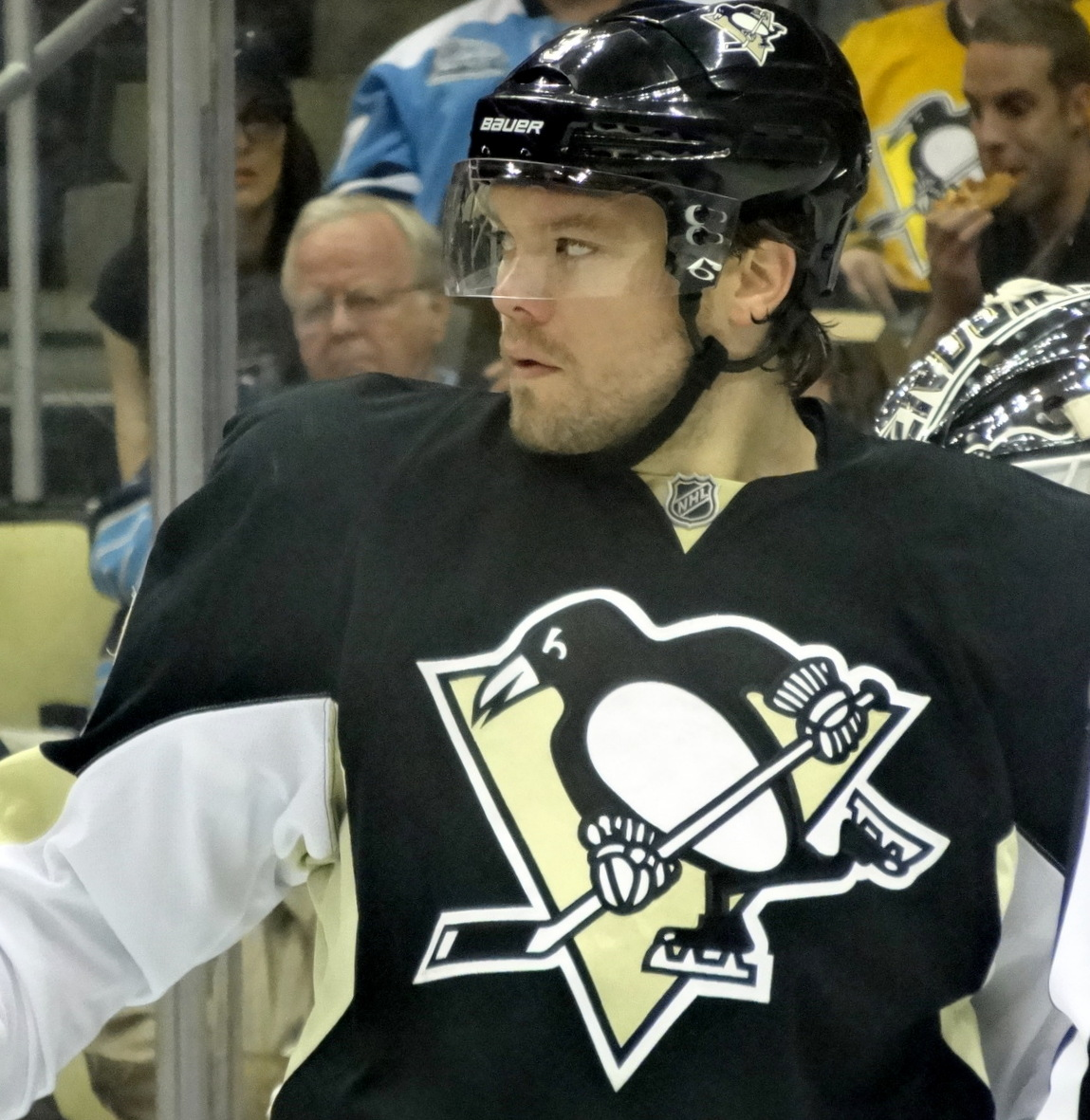
Douglas Murray

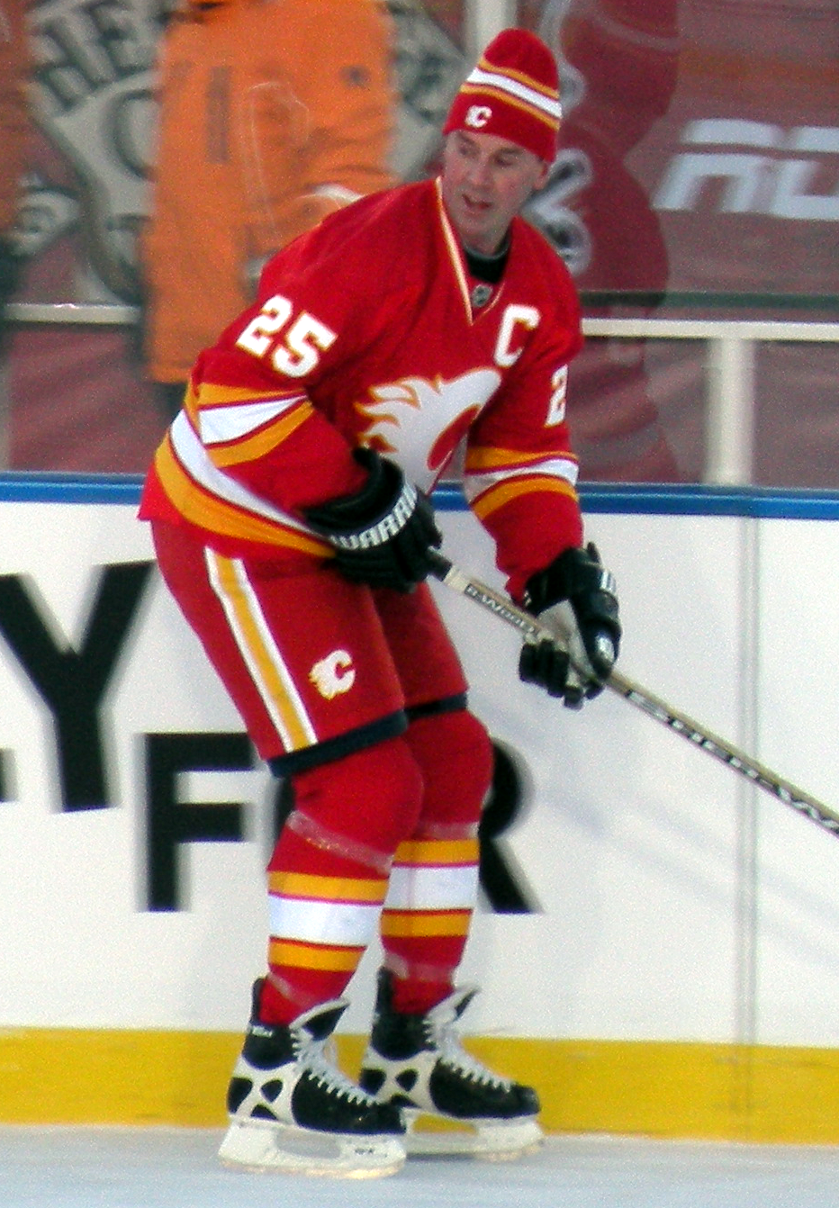
Joe Nieuwendyk

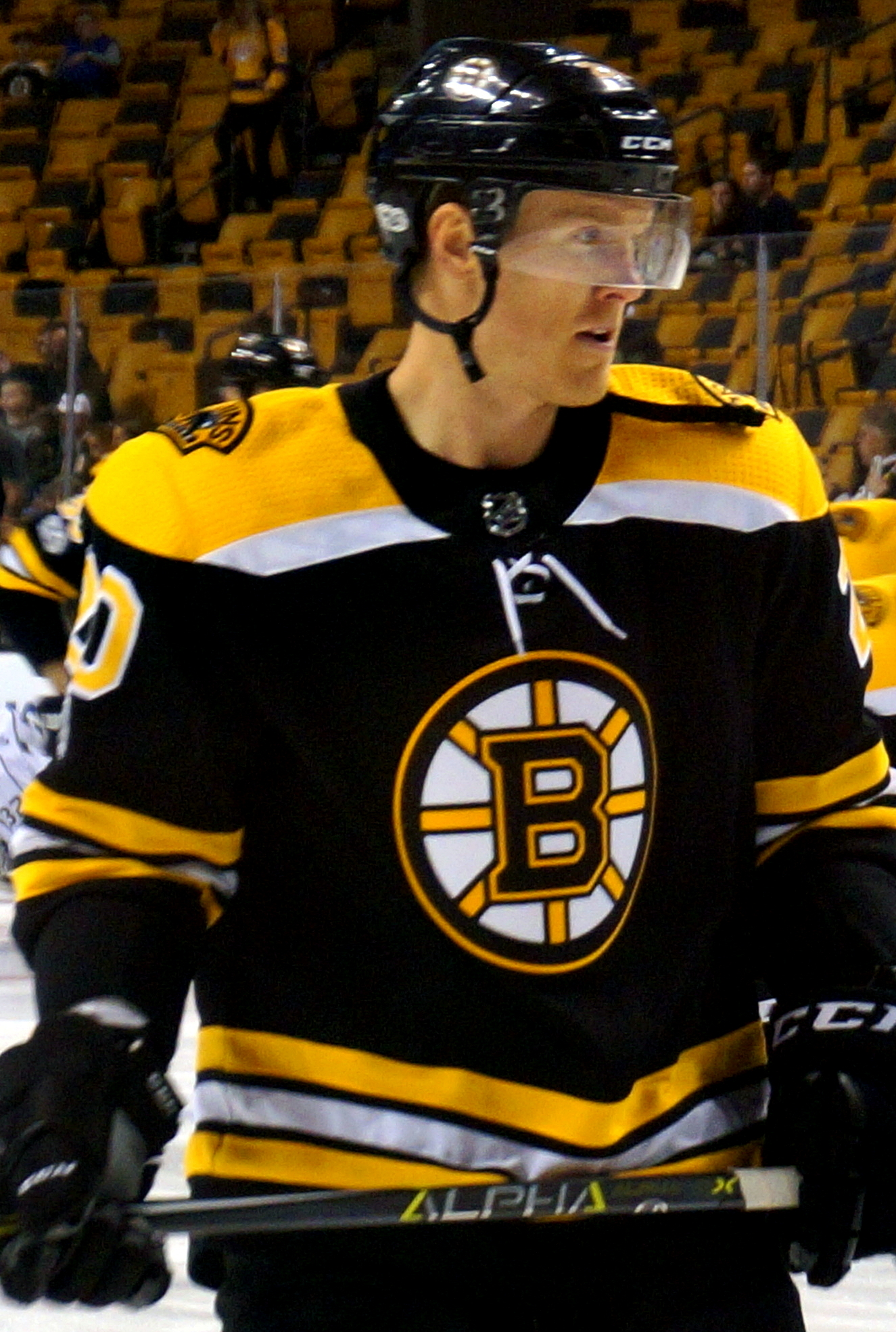
Riley Nash

== See also ==
- Cornell Big Red women's ice hockey
- Cornell Big Red
- Cornell University
