= Peter Tufford =

Canadian ice hockey player

- Born: 1946 (age 79–80) St. Catharines, Ontario, Canada
- Height: 5 ft 8 in (173 cm)
- Weight: 161 lb (73 kg; 11 st 7 lb)
- Position: Center
- Played for: Cornell
- NHL draft: Undrafted
- Playing career: 1966–1970

E. Peter Tufford is a Canadian retired ice hockey center who was an All-American for Cornell.

== Career ==
Tufford only managed to play a handful of games over two seasons for the St. Catharines Black Hawks. Despite the few appearances, he was recruited to Cornell University and played on an undefeated freshman team. He debuted for the varsity squad as a sophomore and hit the ground running, leading the team with 28 goals. Tufford helped Cornell win its first ECAC Championship that season and appear in the program's first NCAA Tournament. He assisted on the only goal in the semifinal and, despite being held scoreless, helped Cornell celebrate its first national championship two days later.

Tufford became an alternate captain as a junior and increased his scoring output. The Big Red were again a dominant force in college hockey and ran though the regular season and conference tournament with just a single loss. In the national tournament, however, Cornell's offense was again stifled by North Dakota and limited to just one goal. The team fell 1–3 and, though they recovered a bit in the consolation game, Cornell was disappointed by their 3rd-place finish. As a senior Tufford increased his point total to 60, finishing tied for 6th in the nation and was named as an All-American. He was the fourth player in his recruiting class to be so honored, following Brian Cornell, Ken Dryden and Bruce Pattison. Cornell received its third tournament bid in 1969, this time managing to return to the championship game. Tufford assisted on Cornell's second goal to tie the game but the team was outdueled by Denver in the third period and missed out on another title.

After graduating Tufford played a year of senior hockey with the independent Syracuse Stars before retiring as a player. He briefly returned to the game as a coach for the Ithaca Stars in 1975. Tufford was inducted into the Cornell Athletic Hall of Fame in 1978.

== Career statistics ==
=== Regular season and playoffs ===
			Regular Season					Playoffs
Season	Team	League	GP	G	A	Pts	PIM	GP	G	A	Pts	PIM
1963–64	St. Catharines Black Hawks	OHA	1	0	0	0	0	—	—	—	—	—
1964–65	St. Catharines Black Hawks	OHA	2	0	0	0	0	—	—	—	—	—
1966–67	Cornell	ECAC Hockey	29	28	19	47	8	—	—	—	—	—
1967–68	Cornell	ECAC Hockey	28	20	33	53	2	—	—	—	—	—
1968–69	Cornell	ECAC Hockey	29	20	40	60	2	—	—	—	—	—
1969–70	Syracuse Stars	Independent	—	—	—	—	—	—	—	—	—	—
NCAA Totals			86	68	92	160	12	—	—	—	—	—

== Awards and honors ==
Award	Year
All-ECAC Hockey First Team	1967–68
ECAC Hockey All-Tournament Second Team	1968
All-ECAC Hockey First Team	1968–69
AHCA East All-American	1968–69
NCAA All-Tournament Second Team	1969
