= 1968 ECAC Hockey men's ice hockey tournament =

1968 ECAC Men's ice hockey tournament
- Dates: March 5–9, 1968
- Teams: 8
- Finals site: Boston Garden; Boston, Massachusetts
- Champions: Cornell (2nd title)
- Winning coach: Ned Harkness (2nd title)
- MVP: Ken Dryden (Cornell)
- ECAC Men's Ice Hockey Tournaments

The 1968 ECAC Hockey Men's Ice Hockey Tournament was the 7th tournament in league history. It was played between March 5 and March 9, 1968. Quarterfinal games were played at home team campus sites, while the 'final four' games were played at the Boston Garden in Boston, Massachusetts. By reaching the championship game both, Cornell and Boston College received invitations to participate in the 1968 NCAA University Division Men's Ice Hockey Tournament.

== Format ==
The tournament featured three rounds of play, all of which were single-elimination. The top eight teams, based on conference rankings, qualified to participate in the tournament. In the quarterfinals the first seed and eighth seed, the second seed and seventh seed, the third seed and sixth seed and the fourth seed and fifth seed played against one another. In the semifinals, the winner of the first and eighth matchup played the winner of the fourth and fifth matchup while the other two remaining teams played with the winners advancing to the championship game and the losers advancing to the third place game.

== Conference standings ==
Note: GP = Games played; W = Wins; L = Losses; T = Ties; Pct. = Winning percentage; GF = Goals for; GA = Goals against

1967–68 ECAC Hockey standings
	Conference							Overall					
	GP	W	L	T	Pct.	GF	GA	GP	W	L	T	GF	GA
Cornell†*	20	19	1	0	.950	144	29	29	27	2	0	187	43
Clarkson	16	11	5	0	.688	91	68	24	16	7	1	159	85
St. Lawrence	17	11	5	1	.676	86	73	23	14	8	1	124	90
Harvard	21	14	7	0	.667	123	74	24	15	9	0	139	88
Boston University	21	13	6	2	.667	116	61	32	20	9	3	174	89
Brown	20	12	6	2	.650	116	63	24	15	7	2	135	79
Boston College	23	14	8	1	.630	113	79	31	19	11	1	155	116
Princeton	23	13	9	1	.587	92	79	24	13	10	1	93	85
New Hampshire^	13	7	6	0	.538	49	50	29	22	7	0	159	77
Colgate	17	9	8	0	.529	67	65	23	12	11	0	96	83
Rensselaer	17	8	9	0	.471	80	70	22	11	11	0	109	94
Army	12	5	7	0	.417	46	50	24	14	10	0	110	84
Yale	22	6	16	0	.273	43	117	24	6	18	0	50	120
Northeastern	17	4	13	0	.250	56	89	24	6	17	1	87	126
Providence	16	3	13	0	.188	32	114	25	7	18	0	67	149
Dartmouth	21	2	19	0	.095	55	115	23	4	19	0	67	120
Pennsylvania	16	1	15	0	.063	22	154	24	6	18	0	42	180
Championship: Cornell † indicates conference regular season champion * indicates conference tournament champion^ New Hampshire had been readmitted to the ECAC but played only a partial schedule and still qualified for the ECAC II playoffs

== Bracket ==
Quarterfinals; March 5
1	Cornell	6
8	Princeton	1
4	Harvard	3
5	Boston University	6
2	Clarkson	7
7	Brown	3
3	St. Lawrence	6
6	Boston College	7*

Semifinals; March 8
1	Cornell	7
5	Boston University	2
2	Clarkson	5
6	Boston College	6**

Championship; March 9
1	Cornell	6
6	Boston College	3
Third place
2	Clarkson	4
5	Boston University	1

Note: * denotes overtime period(s)

=== Quarterfinals ===
==== (1) Cornell vs. (8) Princeton ====
March 5	Cornell	6 – 1	Princeton	Lynah Rink

==== (2) Clarkson vs. (7) Brown ====
March 5	Clarkson	7 – 3	Brown	Clarkson Arena

==== (3) St. Lawrence vs. (6) Boston College ====
March 5	St. Lawrence	6 – 7	OT	Boston College	Appleton Arena

==== (4) Harvard vs. (5) Boston University ====
March 5	Harvard	3 – 6	Boston University	Donald C. Watson Rink

=== Semifinals ===
==== (1) Cornell vs. (5) Boston University ====
March 8	Cornell	7 – 2	Boston University	Boston Garden

==== (2) Clarkson vs. (6) Boston College ====
March 8	Clarkson	5 – 6	2OT	Boston College	Boston Garden

=== Third Place ===
==== (2) Clarkson vs. (5) Boston University ====
March 9	Clarkson	4 – 1	Boston University	Boston Garden

=== Championship ===
==== (1) Cornell vs. (6) Boston College ====
March 9	Cornell	6 – 3	Boston College	Boston Garden

== Tournament awards ==
=== All-Tournament Team ===
==== First Team ====
- F Fred Silver (Clarkson)
- F Brian Cornell (Cornell)
- F Tim Sheehy (Boston College)
- D Skip Stanowski (Cornell)
- D Bruce Pattison (Cornell)
- G Ken Dryden* (Cornell)

* Most Outstanding Player(s)

==== Second Team ====
- F John Hughes (Cornell)
- F Herb Wakabayashi (Boston University)
- F Peter Tufford (Cornell)
- D Andy Hamilton (Clarkson)
- D Darrell Abbott (Boston University)
- G George McPhee (Boston College)
