= Jason DeSantis =

American ice hockey player (born 1986)

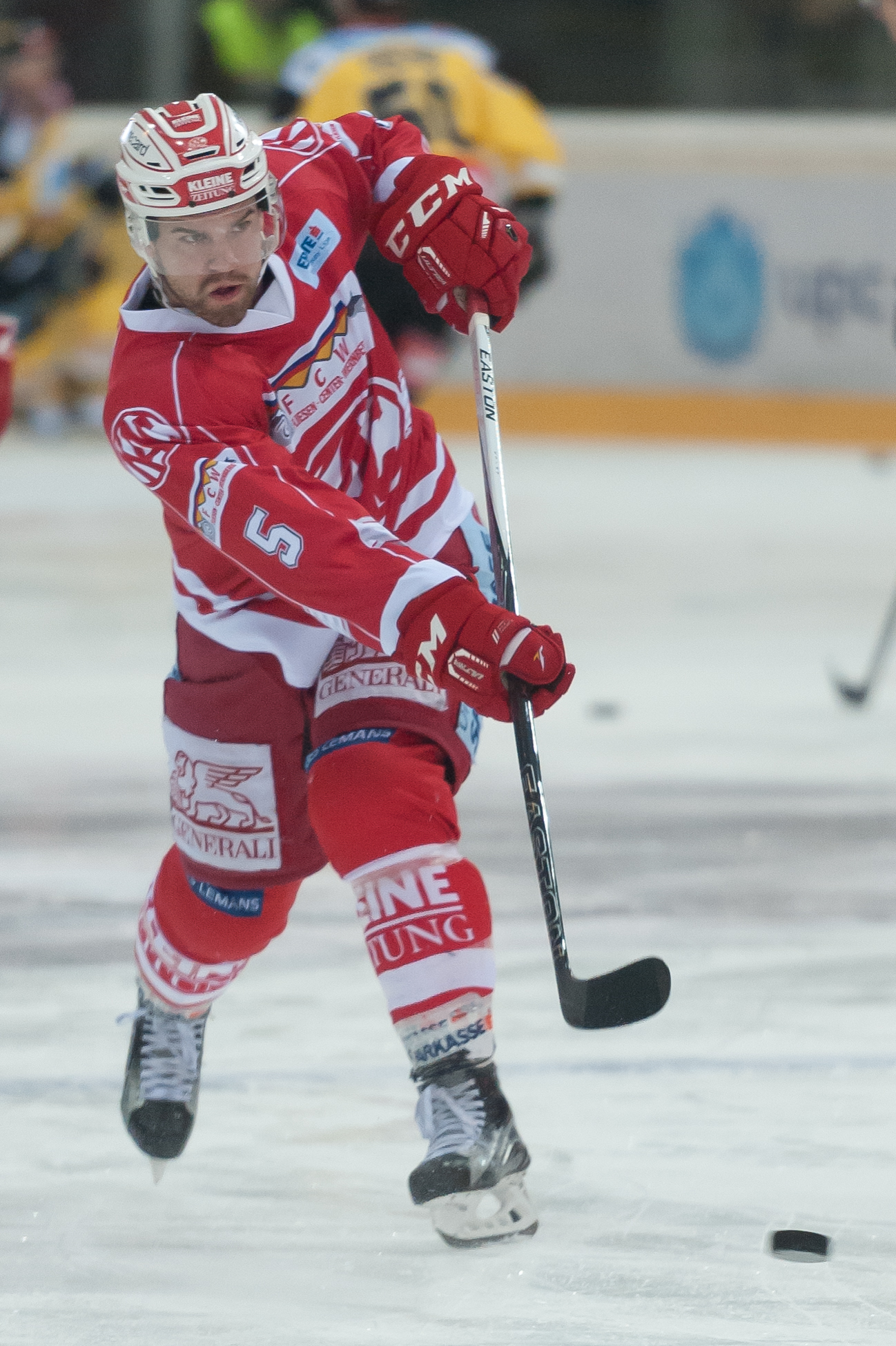
- Born: March 9, 1986 (age 40) Oxford, Michigan, U.S.
- Height: 5 ft 11 in (180 cm)
- Weight: 185 lb (84 kg; 13 st 3 lb)
- Position: Defense
- Shoots: Right
- Metal Ligaen team Former teams: Esbjerg Energy; Philadelphia Phantoms; HC Bílí Tygři Liberec; Wilkes-Barre/Scranton Penguins; St. John's IceCaps; San Antonio Rampage; Hamilton Bulldogs; HIFK; EC KAC; HC TWK Innsbruck; EC VSV; Nottingham Panthers
- NHL draft: Undrafted
- Playing career: 2008–present

Jason DeSantis (born March 9, 1986) is an American professional ice hockey defenseman who was most recently with Esbjerg Energy in Denmark's Metal Ligaen. He previously played with Nottingham Panthers of the British Elite Ice Hockey League and EC VSV of the Austrian Hockey League (EBEL).

== Playing career ==
Prior to turning professional, DeSantis went undrafted playing collegiate hockey at Ohio State University of the Central Collegiate Hockey Association. After a breakout 2011–12 season in the AHL scoring 43 points in 66 games with the St. John's IceCaps, he was signed as a free agent to his first NHL contract on a one-year, two-way deal with the Florida Panthers on June 14, 2012.

Assigned directly to the San Antonio Rampage due to the ongoing lockout, DeSantis appeared in 28 games to start the 2012–13 season with the Rampagage before he was reassigned by the Panthers in an AHL trade to the Hamilton Bulldogs in exchange for Brendon Nash on January 3, 2013. Upon the agreement of a new NHL CBA, the trade was formalized between the Panthers and Montreal Canadiens on January 14, 2013.

On June 17, 2013, after three seasons in the AHL without NHL exposure, DeSantis left to sign a one-year contract with Finnish club, HIFK of the Liiga. After one season with HIFK, DeSantis turned to the Austrian Hockey League agreeing to a two-year deal with EC KAC.

In his two seasons in Klagenfurt, DeSantis in a top pairing role, contributed with 43 points in 84 games before opting to return to North America after three seasons abroad as a free agent. On September 27, 2016, DeSantis opted to continue his playing career in the ECHL, joining the Orlando Solar Bears on a one-year deal. Prior to training camp, DeSantis opted for a release from his contract with the Solar Bears and returned to the EBEL, signing a one-year deal with HC TWK Innsbruck on October 10, 2016.

On 9 August 2019, DeSantis moved to UK EIHL side Nottingham Panthers.

In February 2020, DeSantis moved to Denmark to sign for Esbjerg Energy.

== Career statistics ==
=== Regular season and playoffs ===
			Regular season					Playoffs
Season	Team	League	GP	G	A	Pts	PIM	GP	G	A	Pts	PIM
2002–03	U.S. National Development Team	NAHL	43	4	5	9	42	—	—	—	—	—
2003–04	U.S. National Development Team	NAHL	10	1	1	2	4	—	—	—	—	—
2004–05	Ohio State University	CCHA	42	4	5	9	32	—	—	—	—	—
2005–06	Ohio State University	CCHA	24	2	4	6	30	—	—	—	—	—
2006–07	Ohio State University	CCHA	37	5	20	25	50	—	—	—	—	—
2007–08	Ohio State University	CCHA	41	5	15	20	38	—	—	—	—	—
2007–08	Philadelphia Phantoms	AHL	10	0	5	5	6	10	0	1	1	6
2008–09	Philadelphia Phantoms	AHL	56	1	16	17	12	—	—	—	—	—
2009–10	HC Bílí Tygři Liberec	CZE	14	2	3	5	10	—	—	—	—	—
2010–11	Wheeling Nailers	ECHL	45	6	21	27	38	15	1	2	3	18
2010–11	Wilkes-Barre/Scranton Penguins	AHL	19	1	4	5	8	—	—	—	—	—
2011–12	St. John's IceCaps	AHL	66	11	32	43	58	10	0	3	3	8
2012–13	San Antonio Rampage	AHL	28	2	7	9	22	—	—	—	—	—
2012–13	Hamilton Bulldogs	AHL	27	2	3	5	18	—	—	—	—	—
2013–14	HIFK	Liiga	50	5	9	14	16	—	—	—	—	—
2014–15	EC KAC	EBEL	37	4	15	19	20	9	0	5	5	10
2015–16	EC KAC	EBEL	47	8	16	24	49	7	1	2	3	8
2016–17	HC TWK Innsbruck	EBEL	43	5	13	18	16	4	0	1	1	2
2017–18	EHC Lustenau	AlpsHL	34	10	30	40	43	—	—	—	—	—
2018–19	EC VSV	EBEL	48	5	9	14	20	—	—	—	—	—
2019–20	Nottingham Panthers	EIHL	30	2	9	11	6	—	—	—	—	—
2019–20	Esbjerg Energy	Denmark	6	1	3	4	2	—	—	—	—	—
AHL totals			206	17	67	84	124	20	0	4	4	14

Medal record

Representing United States

Ice hockey

IIHF U18 Championships
Gold medal – first place	2004 Minsk	

=== International ===
Year	Team	Event	Result	GP	G	A	Pts	PIM
2004	United States	WJC18	2nd place, silver medalist(s)	6	1	0	1	4
Junior totals				6	1	0	1	4
