= Lou Reycroft =

American hockey scout

Louis Reycroft
Biographical details
- Born: 1951 (age 74–75); Northborough, MA, USA
- Education: Brown

Playing career
- 1969–1972: Brown
- Position: Goaltender

Coaching career (HC unless noted)
- 1976–1978: Rensselaer (Assistant)
- 1978–1982: Cornell (Assistant)
- 1982–1987: Cornell
- 1987–1993: Calgary Flames (Scout)
- 1993–Present: New Jersey Devils (Scout)

Head coaching record
- Overall: 74-58-9 (.557)

Accomplishments and honors

Championships
- 1986 ECAC Tournament Champion

Louis M. Reycroft (born 1951) is an NHL scout for the New Jersey Devils. He was coach of the Cornell Big Red during a transition period in the mid-1980s. Reycroft has been an NHL scout for almost 30 years, working for both the Devils and the Calgary Flames.

== Career ==
Lou Reycroft's college career began as a goaltender for Brown from 1969 to 1972. He would return to the college ranks a few years after graduating as an assistant for Rensselaer under Jim Salfi. After two winning seasons in Troy Reycroft moved to Ithaca and took over the same position with Cornell as Dick Bertrand's assistant. Reycroft remained with the Big Red until Bertrand resigned to take over as head coach for Ferris State. Cornell soon named Reycroft as the successor behind the bench.

Reycroft was taking over a team that had just seen its first losing season in 21 years and only one tournament appearance since 1973. The first few years under Reycroft weren't much better, but by 1985 it looked like the Big Red were beginning to regain their power that had been waning since the start of the decade. That year, however, also coincided with the schism that occurred in the ECAC conference. Spearheaded by Providence coach Lou Lamoriello, seven members broke away from the ECAC to form Hockey East after years-long arguments over scheduling could not be resolved. In the first year under the new (smaller) conference Reycroft led the Big Red to an 18-win season and followed that up with a 21-win campaign as well as a conference championship and an appearance in the 1986 tournament. Reycroft would not last much longer at Cornell, however, after the team dropped to an 11-16-0 record the next year he was out as head coach.

in 1987 Reycroft left the college ranks behind and accepted a scouting position with the Calgary Flames. He was with the organization when it won its first (and thus far only) Stanley Cup in 1989. four years later he accepted a similar position with the New Jersey Devils, serving under former rival coach Lou Lamoriello. As of 2016 Reycroft is still a scout for the Devils, even surviving into the new regime of Ray Shero. Reycroft was with New Jersey for each of their three titles (1995, 2000 and 2003) and while he was part of 4 championship teams, he has yet to have his name engraved on the cup.

== Head coaching record ==
Record table
Season	Team	Overall	Conference	Standing	Postseason
Cornell Big Red (ECAC Hockey) (1982–1987)
1982–83	Cornell	13-10-3	10-8-3	9th	
1983–84	Cornell	11-15-0	9-12-0	12th	
1984–85	Cornell	18-10-2	14-6-1	4th	ECAC Third Place Game (Win)
1985–86	Cornell	21-7-4	13-6-2	3rd	NCAA Quarterfinals
1986–87	Cornell	11-16-0	8-14-0	9th	
Cornell:		74-58-9	54-46-6		
Total:		74-58-9			
National champion Postseason invitational champion Conference regular season champion Conference regular season and conference tournament champion Division regular season champion Division regular season and conference tournament champion Conference tournament champion
