= Doug Dadswell =

Canadian ice hockey player

- Born: February 7, 1964 (age 62) Scarborough, Ontario, Canada
- Height: 5 ft 10 in (178 cm)
- Weight: 180 lb (82 kg; 12 st 12 lb)
- Position: Goaltender
- Caught: Left
- Played for: Calgary Flames
- National team: Canada
- NHL draft: Undrafted
- Playing career: 1986–1993

Doug Dadswell (born February 7, 1964) is a Canadian former professional ice hockey goaltender. He played 27 games in the National Hockey League for the Calgary Flames during the 1986–87 and 1987–88 seasons. The rest of his career, which lasted from 1986 to 1993, was spent in the minor leagues.

== Playing career ==
Dadswell was born in Scarborough, Ontario. As a youth, he played in the 1977 Quebec International Pee-Wee Hockey Tournament with a minor ice hockey team from Toronto.

Dadswell played two seasons of NCAA hockey for the Cornell University, leading the Big Red to the Eastern College Athletic Conference title in 1985–86. His performance led to his being signed by the Flames in 1986. Dadswell turned pro the following season, spending the bulk of the year in the American Hockey League with the Moncton Golden Flames. He earned a call-up to the NHL late in the 1986–87 season where he played two games with the Flames. In 1987–88, he won the backup position behind Mike Vernon and appeared in 25 more games with the Flames. However, when the Flames acquired Rick Wamsley late in the season, Dadswell found himself out of the NHL. He bounced around the minor leagues until 1993, but never returned to the NHL and retired from professional hockey in 1993.

Dadswell also played ten games for the Calgary Rad'z of the Roller Hockey International in 1992–93.

In 2000, Dadswell was inducted into the Cornell Athletic Hall of Fame.

== Career statistics ==
=== Regular season and playoffs ===
			Regular season									Playoffs
Season	Team	League	GP	W	L	T	MIN	GA	SO	GAA	SV%	GP	W	L	MIN	GA	SO	GAA	SV%
1981–82	Thornhill Thunderbirds	COJHL	15	—	—	—	865	64	0	4.44	—	—	—	—	—	—	—	—	—
1982–83	Richmond Hill Dynes	OPJAHL	27	13	12	1	1575	149	0	5.67	—	—	—	—	—	—	—	—	—
1983–84	Pickering Panthers	MetJBHL	26	—	—	—	1520	98	0	3.86	—	—	—	—	—	—	—	—	—
1984–85	Cornell University	ECAC	28	17	10	1	654	97	0	3.52	.898	—	—	—	—	—	—	—	—
1985–86	Cornell University	ECAC	30	20	7	3	1815	92	1	3.04	.913	—	—	—	—	—	—	—	—
1986–87	Calgary Flames	NHL	2	0	1	1	125	10	0	4.80	.861	—	—	—	—	—	—	—	—
1986–87	Moncton Golden Flames	AHL	42	23	12	0	2275	138	1	3.64	.852	6	2	4	326	23	0	4.20	—
1987–88	Calgary Flames	NHL	25	8	7	2	129	89	0	4.37	.858	—	—	—	—	—	—	—	—
1988–89	Salt Lake Golden Eagles	IHL	32	15	10	3	1723	110	2	3.83	—	—	—	—	—	—	—	—	—
1988–89	Indianapolis Ice	IHL	24	4	15	0	1207	122	0	6.06	—	—	—	—	—	—	—	—	—
1990–91	Canadian National Team	Intl	28	16	6	1	1599	78	0	2.92	—	—	—	—	—	—	—	—	—
1991–92	Cincinnati Cyclones	ECHL	24	14	9	1	1361	89	0	3.92	—	—	—	—	—	—	—	—	—
1991–92	Utica Devils	AHL	22	7	9	2	1168	67	0	3.44	.905	2	0	2	119	8	0	4.03	.880
1992–93	Birmingham Bulls	ECHL	8	3	3	0	401	36	0	5.39	.868	—	—	—	—	—	—	—	—
1992–93	Cincinnati Cyclones	IHL	17	5	11	1	1006	63	1	3.76	.881	—	—	—	—	—	—	—	—
NHL totals			27	8	8	3	1,344	99	0	4.42	.859	—	—	—	—	—	—	—	—

== Awards and honors ==
Award	Year
All-ECAC Hockey Second Team	1985–86
AHCA East First-Team All-American	1985–86

Awards and achievements
Preceded by Daren Puppa	ECAC Hockey Most Outstanding Player in Tournament; 1986	Succeeded by Lane MacDonald
