= Brock Tredway =

Canadian ice hockey player (born 1959)

- Born: June 23, 1959 (age 67) Highland Creek, Ontario, Canada
- Height: 6 ft 0 in (183 cm)
- Weight: 180 lb (82 kg; 12 st 12 lb)
- Position: Right wing
- Shot: Right
- Played for: Los Angeles Kings; Klagenfurter AC
- NHL draft: Undrafted
- Playing career: 1981–1986

R. Brock Tredway (born June 23, 1959) is a Canadian former professional ice hockey winger. On April 19, 1982, during the 1981–82 season, he played one playoff game in the National Hockey League with the Los Angeles Kings against the Vancouver Canucks. The rest of his career, which lasted from 1981 until 1986, was mainly spent in the American Hockey League.

== Biography ==
As a youth, Tredway played in the 1972 Quebec International Pee-Wee Hockey Tournament with a minor ice hockey team from West Hill, Toronto Scarborough, Toronto.

A 1981 graduate of Cornell University, he played four seasons with the Cornell Big Red and was a member of the Quill and Dagger society. Tredway holds a number of all-time Cornell Career records including Goals Scored (113), Game Winning Goals (15), Hat Tricks (13), and Power Play Goals (46).

After graduation, Tredway joined the American Hockey League's New Haven Nighthawks. He played one game in the National Hockey League with the Los Angeles Kings during the 1982 Stanley Cup Playoffs.

== Career statistics ==
=== Regular season and playoffs ===
			Regular season					Playoffs
Season	Team	League	GP	G	A	Pts	PIM	GP	G	A	Pts	PIM
1977–78	Cornell University	ECAC	22	28	13	41	2	—	—	—	—	—
1978–79	Cornell University	ECAC	29	31	29	60	8	—	—	—	—	—
1979–80	Cornell University	ECAC	31	25	35	60	10	—	—	—	—	—
1980–81	Cornell University	ECAC	31	29	17	46	4	—	—	—	—	—
1981–82	New Haven Nighthawks	AHL	80	35	24	59	7	4	3	3	6	0
1981–82	Los Angeles Kings	NHL	—	—	—	—	—	1	0	0	0	0
1982–83	New Haven Nighthawks	AHL	74	15	26	41	9	12	1	7	8	2
1983–84	New Haven Nighthawks	AHL	70	21	42	63	4	—	—	—	—	—
1984–85	Klagenfurter AC	AUT	39	19	21	40	20	—	—	—	—	—
1985–86	New Haven Nighthawks	AHL	39	2	6	8	0	—	—	—	—	—
AHL totals			263	73	98	171	20	16	4	10	14	2
NHL totals			—	—	—	—	—	1	0	0	0	0

== Awards and honors ==
Award	Year
All-ECAC Hockey Second team	1978–79

== See also ==
- List of players who played only one game in the NHL
