= 1986 ECAC Hockey men's ice hockey tournament =

Ice hockey tournament

1986 ECAC Men's ice hockey tournament
- Dates: March 7–15, 1986
- Teams: 8
- Finals site: Boston Garden; Boston, Massachusetts
- Champions: Cornell (7th title)
- Winning coach: Lou Reycroft (1st title)
- MVP: Doug Dadswell (Cornell)
- ECAC Men's Ice Hockey Tournaments

The 1986 ECAC Hockey Men's Ice Hockey Tournament was the 25th tournament in league history. It was played between March 7 and March 15, 1986. Quarterfinal games were played at home team campus sites, while the 'final four' games were played at the Boston Garden in Boston, Massachusetts. By winning the tournament, Cornell received the ECAC's automatic bid to the 1986 NCAA Division I Men's Ice Hockey Tournament.

== Format ==
The tournament featured three rounds of play. The four teams that finish below eighth place in the standings are not eligible for tournament play. In the quarterfinals the first seed and eighth seed, the second seed and seventh seed, the third seed and sixth seed and the fourth seed and fifth seed played a two-game series to determine the winner. In the two games no overtime was permitted and if the two teams remained tied after the two games then a 10-minute mini-game would be played where a sudden-death overtime was allowed if the scheduled time did not produce a victor. After the opening round every series becomes a single-elimination game. In the semifinals, the highest seed plays the lowest remaining seed while the two remaining teams play with the winners advancing to the championship game and the losers advancing to the third place game. The tournament champion receives an automatic bid to the 1986 NCAA Division I Men's Ice Hockey Tournament.

== Conference standings ==
Note: GP = Games played; W = Wins; L = Losses; T = Ties; PTS = Points; GF = Goals For; GA = Goals Against

1985–86 ECAC Hockey standings
	Conference							Overall					
	GP	W	L	T	PTS	GF	GA	GP	W	L	T	GF	GA
Harvard†	21	18	3	0	36	129	53	34	25	8	1	187	95
Yale	21	15	6	0	30	104	72	30	20	10	0	160	116
Cornell*	21	13	6	2	28	101	74	32	21	7	4	145	104
Rensselaer	21	13	7	1	27	100	88	32	20	11	1	167	139
Clarkson	21	12	6	3	27	101	70	32	18	11	3	143	110
Vermont	21	11	10	0	22	64	63	31	17	13	1	102	99
St. Lawrence	21	10	11	0	20	92	92	31	16	15	0	145	150
Colgate	21	9	11	1	19	82	109	32	15	15	2	142	147
Princeton	21	7	13	0	14	76	82	30	11	17	2	109	111
Dartmouth	21	4	17	0	8	59	121	25	7	18	0	78	134
Army^	11	2	9	0	4^	36	57	30	18	11	1	154	111
Brown	21	3	18	0	6	63	127	23	4	19	0	73	134
Championship: Cornell † indicates conference regular season champion * indicates conference tournament champion^ Army played a half schedule

== Bracket ==
Teams are reseeded after the first round

Quarterfinals; March 7–8
1	Harvard	2	6	—
8	Colgate	0	4	—
2	Yale	6	9	—
7	St. Lawrence	5	4	—
(Pairings are reseeded after the first round)
3	Cornell	8	3	—
6	Vermont	3	3	—
4	Rensselaer	1	4	—
5	Clarkson	3	6	—

Semifinals; March 14
1	Harvard	2
5	Clarkson	4
2	Yale	2
3	Cornell	3**

Championship; March 15
3	Cornell	3*
5	Clarkson	2
Third Place
1	Harvard	6
2	Yale	3

Note: * denotes overtime period(s)

=== Quarterfinals ===
==== (1) Harvard vs. (8) Colgate ====
March 7	Harvard	2 – 0	Colgate	Bright Hockey Center

March 8	Harvard	6 – 4	Colgate	Bright Hockey Center

Harvard won series 2–0

==== (2) Yale vs. (7) St. Lawrence ====
March 7	Yale	6 – 5	St. Lawrence	Ingalls Rink

March 8	Yale	9 – 4	St. Lawrence	Ingalls Rink

Yale won series 2–0

==== (3) Cornell vs. (6) Vermont ====
March 7	Cornell	8 – 3	Vermont	Lynah Rink

March 8	Cornell	3 – 3	Vermont	Lynah Rink

Cornell won series 1–0–1

==== (4) Rensselaer vs. (5) Clarkson ====
March 7	Rensselaer	1 – 3	Clarkson	Houston Field House

March 8	Rensselaer	4 – 6	Clarkson	Houston Field House

Clarkson won series 2–0

=== Semifinals ===
==== (1) Harvard vs. (5) Clarkson ====
March 14	Harvard	2 – 4	Clarkson	Boston Garden

==== (2) Yale vs. (3) Cornell ====
March 14	Yale	2 – 3	2OT	Cornell	Boston Garden

=== Third Place ===
==== (1) Harvard vs. (2) Yale ====
March 15	Harvard	6 – 3	Yale	Boston Garden

=== Championship ===
==== (3) Cornell vs. (5) Clarkson ====
March 15	Cornell	3 – 2	OT	Clarkson	Boston Garden

== Tournament awards ==
=== All-Tournament Team ===
None

=== MOP ===
- Doug Dadswell (Cornell)
