= 1969 ECAC Hockey men's ice hockey tournament =

1969 ECAC Men's ice hockey tournament
- Dates: March 4–8, 1969
- Teams: 8
- Finals site: Boston Garden; Boston, Massachusetts
- Champions: Cornell (3rd title)
- Winning coach: Ned Harkness (3rd title)
- MVP: Ken Dryden (Cornell)
- ECAC Men's Ice Hockey Tournaments

The 1969 ECAC Hockey Men's Ice Hockey Tournament was the 8th tournament in league history. It was played between March 4 and March 8, 1969. Quarterfinal games were played at home team campus sites, while the 'final four' games were played at the Boston Garden in Boston, Massachusetts. By reaching the championship game both, Cornell and Harvard received invitations to participate in the 1969 NCAA University Division Men's Ice Hockey Tournament.

== Format ==
The tournament featured three rounds of play, all of which were single-elimination. The top eight teams, based on conference rankings, qualified to participate in the tournament. In the quarterfinals the first seed and eighth seed, the second seed and seventh seed, the third seed and sixth seed and the fourth seed and fifth seed played against one another. In the semifinals, the winner of the first and eighth matchup played the winner of the fourth and fifth matchup while the other two remaining teams played with the winners advancing to the championship game and the losers advancing to the third place game.

== Conference standings ==
Note: GP = Games played; W = Wins; L = Losses; T = Ties; Pct. = Winning percentage; GF = Goals for; GA = Goals against

1968–69 ECAC Hockey standings
	Conference							Overall					
	GP	W	L	T	Pct.	GF	GA	GP	W	L	T	GF	GA
Cornell†*	20	19	1	0	.950	139	39	29	27	2	0	190	54
Boston College	21	16	5	0	.762	114	72	26	19	7	0	144	91
Harvard	23	16	6	1	.717	135	74	28	19	8	1	157	101
Clarkson	18	12	5	1	.694	94	65	28	19	7	2	158	96
New Hampshire	16	10	5	1	.656	68	56	29	22	6	1	155	77
Boston University	21	13	8	0	.619	107	69	29	19	10	1	154	84
Rensselaer	14	8	5	1	.607	58	54	21	12	8	1	93	77
Brown	20	10	9	1	.525	98	83	22	10	11	1	100	86
St. Lawrence	18	8	8	2	.500	83	76	24	11	11	2	102	96
Army	11	4	6	1	.409	45	48	28	20	7	1	167	104
Yale	23	9	14	0	.391	72	113	24	9	15	0	72	113
Colgate	16	6	10	0	.375	53	68	25	12	13	0	116	110
Dartmouth	21	6	13	2	.333	83	146	23	7	14	2	91	154
Providence	15	4	11	0	.267	43	76	21	7	14	0	67	95
Northeastern	18	4	14	0	.222	56	108	23	7	16	0	74	127
Princeton	23	5	18	0	.217	62	91	24	5	19	0	62	91
Pennsylvania	15	1	14	0	.067	44	116	22	7	15	0	79	131
Championship: Cornell † indicates conference regular season champion * indicates conference tournament champion

== Bracket ==
Quarterfinals; March 4
1	Cornell	3
8	St. Lawrence	0
4	Boston University	4
5	Rensselaer	2
2	Harvard	4*
7	New Hampshire	3
3	Boston College	2
6	Clarkson	4

Semifinals; March 7
1	Cornell	3*
4	Boston University	2
2	Harvard	8
6	Clarkson	6

Championship; March 8
1	Cornell	4
2	Harvard	2
Third place
4	Boston University	5
6	Clarkson	0

Note: * denotes overtime period(s)

=== Quarterfinals ===
==== (1) Cornell vs. (8) St. Lawrence ====
March 4	Cornell	3 – 0	St. Lawrence	Lynah Rink

==== (2) Harvard vs. (7) New Hampshire ====
March 4	Harvard	4 – 3	OT	New Hampshire	Donald C. Watson Rink

==== (3) Boston College vs. (6) Clarkson ====
March 4	Boston College	2 – 4	Clarkson	McHugh Forum

==== (4) Boston University vs. (5) Rensselaer ====
March 4	Boston University	4 – 2	Rensselaer	Boston Arena

=== Semifinals ===
==== (1) Cornell vs. (4) Boston University ====
March 7	Cornell	3 – 2	OT	Boston University	Boston Garden

==== (2) Harvard vs. (6) Clarkson ====
March 7	Harvard	8 – 6	Clarkson	Boston Garden

=== Third Place ===
==== (4) Boston University vs. (6) Clarkson ====
March 8	Boston University	5 – 0	Clarkson	Boston Garden

=== Championship ===
==== (1) Cornell vs. (2) Harvard ====
March 8	Cornell	4 – 2	Harvard	Boston Garden

== Tournament awards ==
=== All-Tournament Team ===
==== First Team ====
- F Joe Cavanagh (Harvard)
- F Brian Cornell (Cornell)
- F Herb Wakabayashi (Boston University)
- D Chris Gurry (Harvard)
- D Bruce Pattison (Cornell)
- G Ken Dryden* (Cornell)

* Most Outstanding Player(s)

==== Second Team ====
- F Tom Deacon (Clarkson)
- F Eddie Wright (Boston University)
- F Kevin Pettit (Cornell)
- D Bill Hinch (Boston University)
- D Terry Flaman (Harvard)
- G Jim McCann (Boston University)
