= Laing Kennedy =

American college athletics administrator

Laing E. Kennedy is a sports administrator. He previously served as athletic director for Kent State University in Kent, Ohio, United States since 1994 and previously served as athletic director at Cornell University in Ithaca, New York from 1983 to 1994. In 2005 he began serving as a member of the NCAA Division I Basketball Committee in a five-year position, the second representative ever from the Mid-American Conference. He currently resides in Kent, Ohio.

== Background ==
Kennedy is a native of Woodstock, Ontario, Canada. He attended college at Cornell University, earning a bachelor's degree in animal science in 1963. While at Cornell, he was a member of the Quill and Dagger society and played for the men's ice hockey team. As a goalkeeper he earned All-Ivy League honors for three consecutive years and attained All-America status in 1963 along with being named Cornell's Outstanding Athlete.

== Career ==
=== Cornell University ===
Kennedy served as Cornell's athletic director from 1983 to 1994. While there, Cornell totaled nine team national championships, 36 Ivy League team championships and 102 All-Americans. It was also during his tenure that several upgrades were made to athletic facilities including the press box and playing surface at Schoellkopf Field and construction of the Alberding Field House (now Bartels Hall) and the Oxley Equestrian Center.

=== Kent State University ===
Kennedy served as athletic director at Kent State University from 1994 to June 30, 2010. Through the 2008–09 season, Kennedy's tenure has seen the Golden Flashes win 251 individual Mid-American Conference titles, 85 MAC team titles, along with 83 All-America honors. All four of Kent State's Reese Trophy wins, awarded for best men's athletic accomplishments in the MAC, occurred under Kennedy with the most recent being in 2009. The women's athletic teams have won the MAC's Jacoby Trophy 5 times under Kennedy with both men and women consistently finishing in the top 3. He oversaw the addition of two varsity sports, women's soccer and women's golf, and major facility upgrades at Dix Stadium, the MAC Center, and Olga Mural Field at Schoonover Stadium. New facilities built during Kennedy's tenure include Murphy-Mellis Field for field hockey, the Ferrara and Page Golf Training and Learning Center for men's and women's golf, the Diamond at Dix for softball, and the Athletic Academic Resource Center for all KSU student-athletes. Kent State was given full certification by the NCAA both in 1997 and 2004. He also oversaw completion of a comprehensive gender equity study, and the formation of two organizations: the National Athletic Development Council which systematically evaluates the various sports programs and the Student-Athlete Advisory Committee which provides input on the department's planning process.

Kennedy was named the Northeast Region Division I-A Athletic Director of the Year by the National Association of Collegiate Directors of Athletics (NACDA) in both 2002 and 2006. In August of 2009, he announced that he would retire after the conclusion of the 2009-2010 athletic season.

== Awards and honors ==
Award	Year
All-ECAC Hockey Second Team	1961–62
All-ECAC Hockey Second Team	1962–63
