= Bruce Pattison =

Canadian ice hockey player

- Born: 1946 (age 79–80) Aurora, Ontario, Canada
- Height: 5 ft 9 in (175 cm)
- Weight: 170 lb (77 kg; 12 st 2 lb)
- Position: Defenseman
- Played for: Cornell
- NHL draft: Undrafted
- Playing career: 1966–1969

D. Bruce Pattison is a Canadian retired ice hockey defenseman who was an All-American for Cornell.

== Career ==
Pattison was recruited by Ned Harkness out of Upper Canada College, a private high school in Toronto with very high academic standards. Pattison played in every game for the varsity team as a sophomore when Cornell won its first national championship, going 27-1-1. He became one of the team's standout players as a junior, earning All-conference and All-American honors in each of his final two seasons. During those last two years, Cornell lost only two games each season and finished with some of the lowest goals against totals in the history of college hockey. Unfortunately for Pattison, one of those losses in each of those years was in the NCAA tournament. Thus, in his three years at Cornell, he finished 1st, 3rd and 2nd in the NCAA championship.

Pattison retired as a player after graduating and was inducted into the Cornell Athletic Hall of Fame in 1983. He also lettered in football and golf.

== Career statistics ==
=== Regular season and playoffs ===
			Regular Season					Playoffs
Season	Team	League	GP	G	A	Pts	PIM	GP	G	A	Pts	PIM
1964–65	Upper Canada College	CISAA	—	—	—	—	—	—	—	—	—	—
1966–67	Cornell	ECAC Hockey	29	5	11	16	16	—	—	—	—	—
1967–68	Cornell	ECAC Hockey	29	14	29	43	18	—	—	—	—	—
1968–69	Cornell	ECAC Hockey	28	9	17	26	22	—	—	—	—	—
NCAA Totals			86	28	57	85	56	—	—	—	—	—

== Awards and honors ==
Award	Year
All-ECAC Hockey First Team	1967–68
AHCA East All-American	1967–68
ECAC Hockey All-Tournament First Team	1968
All-ECAC Hockey First Team	1968–69
AHCA East All-American	1968–69
ECAC Hockey All-Tournament First Team	1969
NCAA All-Tournament Team	1969
