= Brendon Nash =

Canadian professional ice hockey player (born 1987)

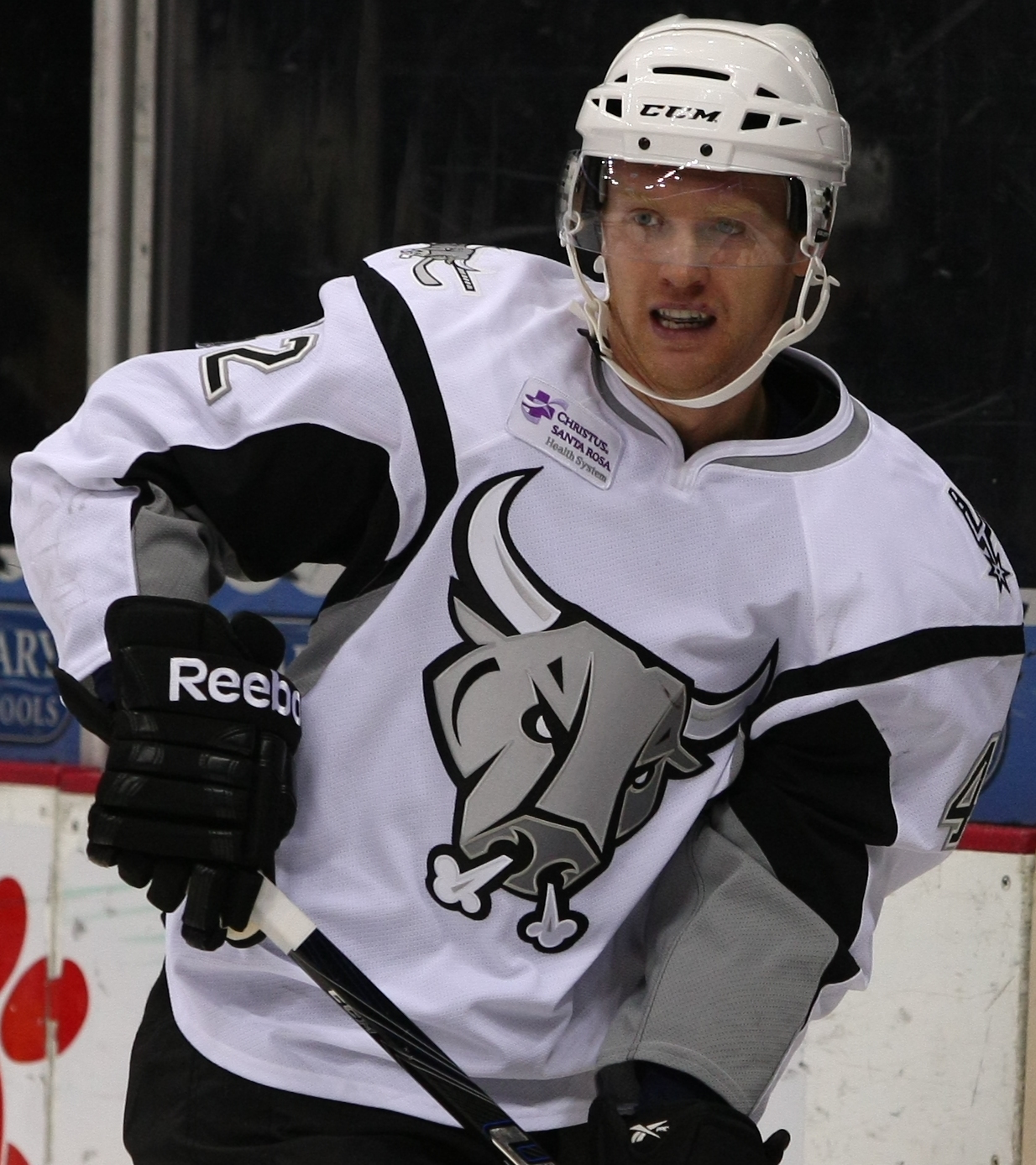
- Nash with the San Antonio Rampage in 2013
- Born: March 31, 1987 (age 39) Kamloops, British Columbia, Canada
- Height: 6 ft 3 in (191 cm)
- Weight: 206 lb (93 kg; 14 st 10 lb)
- Position: Defence
- Shot: Left
- Played for: Montreal Canadiens; HC Kladno; Graz 99ers
- NHL draft: Undrafted
- Playing career: 2010–2020

Brendon Gregory Nash (born March 31, 1987) is a Canadian former professional ice hockey player. He last played for the Graz 99ers of the Austrian Hockey League (EBEL). Brendon is the brother of Riley Nash.

== Playing career ==
After completing his collegiate career with Cornell University in the ECAC, on March 30, 2010, he was signed as a free agent by the Montreal Canadiens to a two-year entry-level contract. In the following 2010–11 season, on February 15, 2011, the Canadiens recalled Nash from their AHL affiliate, the Hamilton Bulldogs, for two games. Nash missed the entire 2011–12 season after undergoing shoulder surgery in September 2011 for an injury suffered in training camp.

On June 29, 2012, the Canadiens announced that Nash had been re-signed to a one-year contract After appearing in 26 games for the Bulldogs in the 2012–13 season, Nash was reassigned by the Canadiens in an AHL trade to the San Antonio Rampage in exchange for Jason DeSantis on January 3, 2013. Upon the agreement of a new NHL CBA, the trade was formalized between the Canadiens and Florida Panthers on January 14, 2013.

On August 20, 2013, Nash failed to receive an NHL offer as a free agent, and signed to a one-year AHL contract with the Hartford Wolf Pack.

After spending the 2014–15 season in the ECHL with the Bakersfield Condors on July 25, 2015, Nash signed a one-year deal with European team Rytíři Kladno of the Czech First league, which is owned by Jaromír Jágr. During the 2015–16 season with Kladno, Nash dominated offensively from the blueline contributing with 43 points from 48 games.

On July 4, 2016, Nash continued his European career, in moving to Austria on a one-year deal with Graz 99ers of the EBEL.

== Career statistics ==
| | | | Regular season | | | | | Playoffs |
| Season | Team | League | GP | G | A | Pts | PIM | GP | G | A | Pts | PIM |
|---|---|---|---|---|---|---|---|---|---|---|---|---|
| 2004–05 | Salmon Arm Silverbacks | BCHL | 59 | 0 | 17 | 17 | 40 | 11 | 1 | 6 | 7 | 6 |
| 2005–06 | Salmon Arm Silverbacks | BCHL | 53 | 9 | 34 | 43 | 80 | 10 | 0 | 6 | 6 | 30 |
| 2006–07 | Cornell University | ECAC | 29 | 2 | 12 | 14 | 38 | — | — | — | — | — |
| 2007–08 | Cornell University | ECAC | 24 | 2 | 14 | 16 | 49 | — | — | — | — | — |
| 2008–09 | Cornell University | ECAC | 34 | 2 | 16 | 18 | 38 | — | — | — | — | — |
| 2009–10 | Cornell University | ECAC | 33 | 2 | 17 | 19 | 48 | — | — | — | — | — |
| 2010–11 | Hamilton Bulldogs | AHL | 75 | 5 | 25 | 30 | 58 | 19 | 0 | 4 | 4 | 14 |
| 2010–11 | Montreal Canadiens | NHL | 2 | 0 | 0 | 0 | 0 | — | — | — | — | — |
| 2012–13 | Hamilton Bulldogs | AHL | 26 | 1 | 7 | 8 | 39 | — | — | — | — | — |
| 2012–13 | San Antonio Rampage | AHL | 27 | 5 | 6 | 11 | 16 | — | — | — | — | — |
| 2012–13 | Charlotte Checkers | AHL | 1 | 0 | 0 | 0 | 0 | — | — | — | — | — |
| 2013–14 | Hartford Wolf Pack | AHL | 30 | 0 | 11 | 11 | 35 | — | — | — | — | — |
| 2014–15 | Bakersfield Condors | ECHL | 59 | 4 | 20 | 24 | 82 | — | — | — | — | — |
| 2015–16 | HC Kladno | Czech.1 | 48 | 8 | 35 | 43 | 97 | 6 | 1 | 1 | 2 | 6 |
| 2016–17 | Graz 99ers | EBEL | 33 | 6 | 10 | 16 | 15 | — | — | — | — | — |
| 2017-18 | Rungsted Ishockey | Denmark | 48 | 7 | 25 | 32 | 101 | — | — | — | — | — |
| 2019-20 | Kladno | Czech | 52 | 1 | 16 | 17 | 60 | — | — | — | — | — |
| NHL totals | | | 2 | 0 | 0 | 0 | 0 | — | — | — | — | — |

== Awards and honours ==
| Award | Year |
|---|---|
College
| All-ECAC Hockey Rookie Team | 2006–07 |
| All-ECAC Hockey Second Team | 2008–09 |
| All-ECAC Hockey First Team | 2009–10 |
| AHCA East First-Team All-American | 2009–10 |
