= 1969–70 Cornell Big Red men's ice hockey season =

National champion ECAC Holiday Tournament, champion Syracuse Invitational, champion ECAC Hockey, champion ECAC Tournament, champion NCAA tournament, champion
- Conference: 1st ECAC Hockey
- Home ice: Lynah Rink

Record
- Overall: 29–0–0
- Conference: 21–0–0
- Home: 12–0
- Road: 8–0
- Neutral: 9–0

Coaches and captains
- Head coach: Ned Harkness
- Captain(s): Dick Bertrand; John Hughes; Dan Lodboa

The 1969–70 Cornell Big Red men's ice hockey team represented Cornell University in college ice hockey. In its 7th year under head coach Ned Harkness the team compiled a 29–0–0 record and reached the NCAA tournament for the fourth consecutive year. The Big Red defeated Clarkson 6–4 in the championship game at the Jack Shea Arena in Lake Placid, New York, to become the first and only (as of 2024) undefeated and untied national champion in college men's ice hockey history.

== Season ==
=== Early season ===
After losing the last players from their first championship team, including the best player in program history, Ken Dryden, Cornell was expected to still field a strong team but perhaps not be as good as last year's NCAA runner-up team. After only appearing in spot duty the year before, junior Brian Cropper got his opportunity to start in goal for the Big Red and was eased into the role with Cornell's dominating performance in their opener over Western Ontario. Senior captain Dick Bertrand led the way with a hat-trick while the team scored 4 power play goals in the 8–2 rout. A few days later Cornell welcomed Guelph to the Lynah Rink and while the Big Red were the better team the two fought through a sloppy and contentious affair. The home team built a 3–0 lead in the first but just before the period ended the Gryphons got their first marker and went into the locker room with some confidence. The teams then played the next 34 minutes without a goal scored but when John Hughes notched Cornell's fourth goal with just over 6 minutes to play the game was effectively over.

A few days later Cornell opened its ECAC Hockey schedule against Rensselaer, the only eastern team that had beaten the Big Red during the last season. The upper classmen got a measure of revenge with an 8–2 drubbing of the Engineers in the penalty-filled game. Rensselaer managed their two goals on the power play to Cornell's 3, but it was at even strength where Cornell showed its strength. Cropper was particularly good in net while Dan Lodboa and Kevin Pettit each scored twice.

Cornell hit the road for the first time in their next game against Brown, who gave the Big Red their first big test of the season. Cornell scored the first two goals of the contest before the Bears came roaring back to take a 4–3 lead in the third period. During the game both Steve Giuliani and Ron Simpson were injured, leaving Cornell down two defensemen and giving Brown its chance to pounce on the remaining tired blueline. Despite the hard checking in the game Brown was only penalized once but it came when the team was up in the third and on the ensuing power play Brian McCutcheon was able to tie the game. The match went into overtime, but not before Cropper was required to stop an excellent scoring chance with just 6 seconds remaining in regulation. The overtime session lasted only 34 seconds and was ended by Lodboa after intercepting a pass and firing a slap shot past Brown netminder Don McGinnis. After the game Giuliani was diagnosed with a sprained back and was expected to be out for several weeks while Simpson had to have a knee operation to repair torn ligaments missed a significant portion of the season.

The team's next game was in Boston in front of a half-capacity crowd against Boston University. Still reeling from losing two defenders, Cornell was uncharacteristically sluggish in the opening frame and allowed BU to gain a 1–0 advantage after 20 minutes. The score could have been much worse were it not for Brian Cropper stopping three Terrier breakaways in the period. Giuliani fought through the pain of his bad back but remained a weak spot on Cornell's defense throughout the game. In the second period Cornell began showing their true colors and rallied with back-to-back unassisted goals to take their first lead. BU tied the game shortly thereafter but just past the half-way point of the second Cornell regained their lead with a Bob Aitchison tally followed by a second goal from the junior to give the Big Red a 2-goal advantage. The third period saw a withering attack from the Terries and they were able to get their third of the night past Cropper in the eighth minute but after cutting the lead to 1 BU couldn't get the equalizer. After taking bad penalty near the end of the frame Cornell's power play came through and the team regained the 2-goal edge that remained for the rest of the match.

Cornell returned home to face Yale that weekend. The relatively weak Bulldog team was unable to muster much of a challenge to the Big Red and the home team skated to an 8–1 victory. Four days later the Big Red were in Canton to take on St. Lawrence for the final game before the holiday tournaments. The Larries were barely able to conjure a threat to Cornell, getting only 14 shots on net in the Cropper's first shutout win of the season. Lodboa continued his torrid pace with two more goals and the team went into the break with a 7–0 record.

=== Holiday season ===
In the rematch with RPI Cornell wasn't about to let the Engineers off the mat. Cornell scored twice before the three minute mark and added another two before the first period was over. In the third the team notch three more power play goals and added two more tallied in the third to earn their largest win of the season to that point. Cropper earned his second consecutive shutout while Hughes and McCutcheon each scored twice in the contest. The following night Cornell's shutout streak ended at 14:31 of the first period but the Big Red remained dominant in their 7–2 victory with Bertrand's hat-trick leading Cornell to its fifth consecutive ECAC winter tournament championship.

After the first of the year the team played their second holiday tournament, this time headlining the Syracuse Invitational. Cornell opened against BU and this time the Big Red defense was much more stingy, keeping the Terriers off of the score sheet until the later half of the third period. Boston University provided an equally challenging effort but Cornell was able to score once in each of the first two periods and then responded to BU's power play goal with two markers in less than two minutes to win the game 4–1. In the championship match against Colgate the Big Red weren't as overpowering as they typically were but two power play goals in 10 seconds during the middle frame allowed Cornell to hold onto its lead despite a relatively poor performance from Brian Cropper. The superlative effort from Lodboa in both tournaments earned him both MVPs, the only defenseman to capture two such in-season awards.

=== Close calls and blowouts ===
The first-place Big Red picked up their defensive effort after the tournament by limiting Harvard to a single goal on 26 shots in their next game. After their 12th win of the season, Cornell took two weeks off before their next game and the offense was predictably rusty. The Big Red opened their road game against Toronto with a short handed goal but the Varsity blues tied the game before the period was out. Neither team was able to score in the second, despite a 19-shot barrage by Cornell, but Dick Bertrand was finally able to find the back of the net 75 seconds into the third. Cropper kept the door closed the rest of the way and the Big Red were able to escape with a win in their worst offensive effort of the season.

Four days later Cornell was back in Ithaca and their offense returned in force against Princeton. Lodboa got his 4th 2-goal game of the season, giving him 12 on the year to lead the team (tied with Brian McCutcheon) while the defense as a whole only allowed 12 shots from the Tigers. One found its way past Cropper but by then the Big Red had already built a 4-goal lead. Princeton netminder Tilghman did a fantastic job stopping 53 of 60 shots, including 26 saves in the second period alone. three days later the team was in New Haven for its second game against Yale and while the score wasn't as heavily tilted in Cornell's favor the outcome was the same. Hughes contributed on each of the team's four goals, recording his first hat-trick of the season and taking back the team lead in goals (14). Despite their unblemished record there was still a sense from other programs that Cornell could be beaten and those teams would have their chance to prove just that in the final stretch of the season.

First up after the six-week intercession was over was Colgate and the game turned into a special teams battle with 6 of seven goals scored on the power play, but it was Cornell's man-advantage that ruled the day. A few days later the squad played host to Brown and handily dispatched the Bears 5–1. Steve Giuliani scored his first goal of the season to cap off the match, earning a bit of revenge against the team that injured him earlier in the year. Dan Lodboa's 14th goal tied him with Hughes and McCutcheon for the team lead.

A week later 2nd-place Boston College arrived in Ithaca and with five Big Red players suffering from the flu (including Cropper and Hughes) it appeared that Cornell may have been ripe for the taking. When BC scored less than a minute into the game many in the record home crowd were stunned but the Big Red responded to tie the game soon thereafter. The Eagles took their second lead of the game in the eighth minute of the second period and this time held the lead for three and a half minutes before the boys from Ithaca knotted the score again. The two teams combined for three goals in less than two minutes at the end of the second with Cornell coming out ahead to take a 4–3 lead into the third. From there on Cropper kept the visitors scoreless while Pettit finished off his hat-trick to lead Cornell to a close 5–3 win.

For their next game Cornell got a bit of a reprieve, playing the bottom-feeding Penn Quakers, and posted a new season-high in goals. The Big Red weren't too sharp in the game but the disparity in talent was on display through the game with 10 different Big Red players scoring goals en route to an 11–1 win. The game was in hand to such a degree that backup netminder Bob Rule was put in net for the final 10:10 of the third period and didn't have to make a save. Craig Brush, Doug Stewart and Ron Simpson all scored their first goals of the season.

=== League championships ===
The demolition of Penn apparently gave the big Red a false sense of security because in their next game at Dartmouth the Big Green were the only ones to score in the first. When Cornell did finally tie the game Dartmouth responded with their second just 50 seconds later. The Big Green held the lead well into the third and, just when it was looking like Cornell's win streak would end at 19, senior Garth Ryan tied the game with under 10 minutes to play. The Cornell assault continued and yielded a third goal just under three minutes later from Pettit. Cropper held the fort and allowed the Big Red to escape back to New York with a 3–2 win.

After the close call with losing, Cornell made sure to stay as far away from the loss column as they could. Their next game against Harvard saw an even first period end 2–2 before a 6-goal deluge in the second allowed the Big Red to skate away with a 9–3 victory. The scoring was led by hat-tricks from Dan Lodboa (his first) and Larry Fullan while the win sealed the Ivy League crown for Cornell. Three nights later Ned Harkness benched Kevin Pettit against visiting Pennsylvania, placing Bill Duthie on the top line. The change didn't make much difference at the start of the game when Cornell scored the first two goals, but after Penn got two of their own in less than two minutes the Lynah crowd grew nervous. A power play goal from Brian McCutcheon put Cornell back on top to end the period but the heroics from opposing goalie John Marks in the second allowed Penn to again tie the game with the only goal in the middle frame. With Cropper having one of his poorest performances on the season McCutcheon answered the bell and scored twice before a minute had elapsed in the third and a 31-shot bombardment of the Quaker net yielded a further two goals and give Cornell their 22nd win of the season, guaranteeing them the ECAC title with two games to play.

With only their undefeated streak to occupy their thoughts the Big Red welcomed Dartmouth for a rematch of their near loss. With the home crowd cheering them on, Cornell dismantled the Big Green, scoring 14 times and allowing none in response. Kevin Pettit returned in force, recording a hat-trick and adding two assists but it was third-liner Bob Aitchison who led the way with four goals and an assist, doubling his goal total for the season. Seventeen different players scored a point in the game and with the score 9–0 after the second period, Bob Rule got to play the entire third period in net and made 8 saves in total. Cornell ended their regular season three days later at Princeton and continued their torrid scoring pace, beating the tigers 11–5. Rule got his turn to start the third for a second straight game with the team up 8–1, but Cropper was back in goal after Rule allowed three goals in 7:25, the Tigers Tilghman was once again stellar in stopping 54 Big Red shots but a McCutcheon hat-trick was just the tip of the Cornell iceberg.

=== ECAC Tournament ===
Cornell finished with only the second undefeated regular season for a qualifying team (Clarkson in 1956) but their biggest test still lay ahead. The Big Red received the top seed in the ECAC and were slated to play St. Lawrence in the conference quarterfinals. The selection of the Saints was a surprise as they had finished below Colgate in the standings and had a worse overall record (11–14 compared to 14–7–3). In any case Cornell ran over the Larries, scoring twice in each period and holding St. Lawrence scoreless until just under three minutes remained despite several questionable hits by SLU. In winning the game Cornell tied the NCAA record with 25 consecutive wins (held by the previous year's Big Red team) as well as breaking the power play goals record with their 39th of the season. Dan Lodboa set all-time records for goals by defenseman in both a season (20) and a career (48) and the most assists in a season (34). Larry Fullan set a new record for assists by a sophomore with 30.

Cornell headed to Boston for the semifinal against Harvard and, despite the earlier wins against the Crimson, the Big Red had their hands full. Cornell scored first on the power play but the Crimson offence stormed back and beat Brian Cropper three times in just over four minutes of play to take a 3–1 lead early in the second. Playing from 2 goals behind for the first time all season, Cornell buckled down defensively and held Harvard back while they slowly chipped away at the lead and tied the game before the period was over. With the crisis over Cornell charged out of the gate in the third, scoring twice before 8 minutes had elapsed but in less than three and a half minutes Harvard had tied the game at 5-all. The Crimson, however, took a penalty shortly after their fifth goal and that allowed Larry Fullan to score the deciding marker and send the Big Red to the title game.

Clarkson, the number 2 team in the conference, was the only thing left standing in the way of Cornell winning their fourth consecutive conference championship. In the first meeting between the teams for the season Clarkson was the squad that got the quick start, scoring just over a minute into the contest. Cornell responded 39 seconds later but it quickly became apparent that opposing goalie Bruce Bullock would be tough to beat. Clarkson used their netminder's strong performance to regain the lead on a power play goal before the first period had ended and held onto their advantage until the second half of the game when Ed Ambis tied the game. The goal was Ambis' first of the season and the first by an American Cornell player in over two years. The Cornell attack picked up its intensity in the third period, outshooting Clarkson 24 to 5 but Bullock turned away puck after puck until just 14 seconds remained in regulation when John Hughes fired a puck between Bullock's legs to win the game.

=== NCAA tournament ===
Cornell Arrived in Lake Placid with two goals in mind; win the national title and finish with an unblemished record. Both could be accomplished only by winning two games in the NCAA tournament. The Big Red received the top overall seed, an obvious choice as they were (and remain as of 2019) the only team to reach the tournament without a loss. In the Semifinal they were pitted against a surprise entry, Wisconsin, who had defeated 2-time defending national champion Denver in the WCHA Tournament. Cornell was once more faced with a stellar performance by an opposing goalie, this time Wayne Thomas held the Big Red off of the scoresheet for 45 minutes before the relentless attack finally broke through. Wisconsin scored in the first to gain an early lead and then tried to hold back the much faster eastern team. Wisconsin was so dominated in the game that they could only muster 4 shots in the final 40 minutes but the superb play of Thomas kept the Badgers in the game until the very end. Cornell's two third-period goals gave them a narrow margin of victory but it was enough to send the Big Red into the championship game.

Cornell met Clarkson for a rematch of the ECAC championship and the two heavyweights battled through one of the most memorable game in tournament history. Clarkson scored just 20 seconds into the game, making it the fourth consecutive game that Cornell had to play from behind. Larry Fullan tied the game four minutes later and then a Garth Ryan gave the Big Red their first lead of the night. The Golden Knights were able to tie the game before the period ended and while Bullock wasn't as impressive as he had been in the ECAC tournament, Brian Cropper wasn't playing well and the two team set about trying to outscore one another. Clarkson got their second lead early in the second and it took almost ten minutes for Cornell to retie the contest. Clarkson had two separate power plays before the end of the frame but Cornell's penalty killers performed beautifully and kept the score knotted at three. In the third period Clarkson's Steve Warr took a tripping penalty that allowed Cornell to pull ahead with a power play goal from Dan Lodboa. A minute later Cornell's Westner was sent to the box and followed soon after by Gordon Lowe to give Clarkson a 5-on-3 man advantage. Rather than see Clarkson capitalize on their opportunity, the crowd got to witness Lodboa skate from end to end through the entire Clarkson team and score one of the most spectacular goals in NCAA history. The goal, which would ultimately prove to be the game-winner, was Lodboa's fourth shorthanded tally of the year, a new NCAA record, and the only 3-on-5 goal in any championship game. Just over five minutes later, with a player from each side in the box, Lodboa got his third goal of the night to complete a hat-trick, the first natural hat-trick in championship game history and the only ever hat-trick by a defenseman. Clarkson was able to close the gap slightly 72 seconds later but Cropper and the defense turned the rest aside and Cornell won their second NCAA title.

Lodboa was named as the unanimous Tournament MOP and was named to the All-Tournament Team with John Hughes and Steve Giuliani. Lodboa was the second defensemen (1952) to lead a championship team in scoring, a feat that has only been accomplished twice more (1977 and 2018) as of 2019. Lodboa's 61 points placed him 5th in the nation in scoring. Despite Cornell's #1 defense and utterly dominating offense, only Lodboa was named to the AHCA All-American East Team while he and Cropper were on the All-ECAC Hockey First Team. John Hughes was the lone Cornellian on the conference second team while none of the three individual conference awards went to the Big Red.

In the years since, only Maine in 1993 had much of a chance to accomplish a similar feat to Cornell's undefeated national champion but the Black Bears lost their lone game in February to preserve the 1970 Big Red squad as a unique champion.

== Standings ==
1969–70 ECAC Hockey standings
| | Conference | | | | | | | Overall | | | | | |
| | GP | W | L | T | Pct. | GF | GA | GP | W | L | T | GF | GA |
|---|---|---|---|---|---|---|---|---|---|---|---|---|---|
| Cornell†* | 21 | 21 | 0 | 0 | 1.000 | 142 | 39 | 29 | 29 | 0 | 0 | 179 | 56 |
| Clarkson | 17 | 14 | 3 | 0 | .824 | 87 | 51 | 32 | 24 | 8 | 0 | 171 | 107 |
| Boston University | 22 | 17 | 5 | 0 | .773 | 120 | 67 | 27 | 20 | 7 | 0 | 149 | 82 |
| Harvard | 20 | 14 | 6 | 0 | .700 | 116 | 62 | 25 | 16 | 9 | 0 | 145 | 92 |
| Brown | 21 | 14 | 6 | 1 | .690 | 104 | 70 | 24 | 15 | 8 | 1 | 117 | 81 |
| Boston College | 21 | 14 | 7 | 0 | .667 | 116 | 86 | 26 | 16 | 10 | 0 | 143 | 116 |
| New Hampshire | 17 | 9 | 6 | 2 | .588 | 98 | 73 | 31 | 19 | 10 | 2 | 172 | 120 |
| Colgate | 17 | 7 | 7 | 3 | .500 | 65 | 69 | 24 | 14 | 7 | 3 | 117 | 86 |
| St. Lawrence | 17 | 8 | 9 | 0 | .471 | 75 | 83 | 26 | 11 | 15 | 0 | 112 | 124 |
| Providence | 19 | 7 | 10 | 2 | .421 | 65 | 85 | 25 | 11 | 12 | 2 | 89 | 107 |
| Army | 13 | 5 | 8 | 0 | .385 | 32 | 50 | 25 | 13 | 12 | 0 | 72 | 79 |
| Yale | 22 | 6 | 16 | 0 | .273 | 65 | 107 | 24 | 6 | 18 | 0 | 68 | 113 |
| Dartmouth | 19 | 5 | 14 | 0 | .263 | 80 | 121 | 24 | 9 | 15 | 0 | 101 | 142 |
| Princeton | 21 | 5 | 15 | 1 | .262 | 65 | 132 | 23 | 5 | 17 | 1 | 68 | 139 |
| Rensselaer | 17 | 3 | 13 | 1 | .206 | 54 | 103 | 24 | 8 | 15 | 1 | 85 | 128 |
| Pennsylvania | 15 | 3 | 12 | 0 | .200 | 46 | 80 | 24 | 8 | 16 | 0 | 88 | 114 |
| Northeastern | 17 | 1 | 16 | 0 | .059 | 51 | 105 | 23 | 3 | 20 | 0 | 80 | 138 |
Championship: Cornell † indicates conference regular season champion * indicates conference tournament champion

== Schedule ==
The team's schedule was as follows:

| Date | Opponent^{#} | Rank^{#} | Site | Decision | Result | Record |
Regular season
| November 22 | vs. Western Ontario* | | Lynah Rink • Ithaca, New York | Cropper | W 8–2 | 1–0 |
| November 29 | vs. Guelph* | | Lynah Rink • Ithaca, New York | Cropper | W 4–1 | 2–0 |
| December 2 | vs. Rensselaer | | Lynah Rink • Ithaca, New York | Cropper | W 8–2 | 3–0 (1–0) |
| December 6 | at Brown | | Meehan Auditorium • Providence, Rhode Island | Cropper | W 5–4 ^{OT} | 4–0 (2–0) |
| December 9 | at Boston University | | Boston Arena • Boston, Massachusetts | Cropper | W 5–3 | 5–0 (3–0) |
| December 13 | vs. Yale | | Lynah Rink • Ithaca, New York | Cropper | W 8–1 | 6–0 (4–0) |
| December 17 | at St. Lawrence | | Appleton Arena • Canton, New York | Cropper | W 7–0 | 7–0 (5–0) |
ECAC Holiday Tournament
| December 22 | vs. Rensselaer | | Madison Square Garden • New York, New York (ECAC Holiday Tournament) | Cropper | W 9–0 | 8–0 (6–0) |
| December 23 | vs. St. Lawrence | | Madison Square Garden • New York, New York (ECAC Holiday Tournament) | Cropper | W 7–2 | 9–0 (7–0) |
Syracuse Invitational
| January 2 | vs. Boston University | | Oncenter War Memorial Arena • Boston, Massachusetts (Syracuse Invitational Tournament) | Cropper | W 4–1 | 10–0 (8–0) |
| January 3 | vs. Colgate | | Oncenter War Memorial Arena • Boston, Massachusetts (Syracuse Invitational Tournament) | Cropper | W 5–3 | 11–0 (9–0) |
| January 10 | at Harvard | | Donald C. Watson Rink • Boston, Massachusetts | Cropper | W 3–1 | 12–0 (10–0) |
| January 24 | at Toronto* | | Varsity Arena • Toronto, Ontario | Cropper | W 2–1 | 13–0 (10–0) |
| January 28 | vs. Princeton | | Lynah Rink • Ithaca, New York | Cropper | W 7–1 | 14–0 (11–0) |
| January 31 | at Yale | | Ingalls Rink • New Haven, Connecticut | Cropper | W 4–1 | 15–0 (12–0) |
| February 3 | at Colgate | | Lynah Rink • Ithaca, New York | Cropper | W 5–2 | 16–0 (13–0) |
| February 7 | vs. Brown | | Lynah Rink • Ithaca, New York | Cropper | W 5–1 | 17–0 (14–0) |
| February 14 | vs. Boston College | | Lynah Rink • Ithaca, New York | Cropper | W 5–3 | 18–0 (15–0) |
| February 18 | vs. Pennsylvania | | Cherry Hill Arena • Cherry Hill, New Jersey | Cropper | W 11–1 | 19–0 (16–0) |
| February 21 | at Dartmouth | | Davis Rink • Hanover, New Hampshire | Cropper | W 3–2 | 20–0 (17–0) |
| February 25 | vs. Harvard | | Lynah Rink • Ithaca, New York | Cropper | W 9–3 | 21–0 (18–0) |
| February 28 | vs. Penn | | Lynah Rink • Ithaca, New York | Cropper | W 7–3 | 22–0 (19–0) |
| March 4 | vs. Dartmouth | | Lynah Rink • Ithaca, New York | Cropper | W 14–0 | 23–0 (20–0) |
| March 7 | at Princeton | | Hobey Baker Memorial Rink • Princeton, New Jersey | Cropper | W 11–5 | 24–0 (21–0) |
ECAC Hockey Tournament
| March 10 | vs. St. Lawrence* | | Lynah Rink • Ithaca, New York (ECAC Quarterfinal) | Cropper | W 6–1 | 25–0 (21–0) |
| March 13 | vs. Harvard* | | Boston Garden • Boston, Massachusetts (ECAC Semifinal) | Cropper | W 6–5 | 26–0 (21–0) |
| March 14 | vs. Clarkson* | | Boston Garden • Boston, Massachusetts (ECAC championship) | Cropper | W 3–2 | 27–0 (21–0) |
NCAA tournament
| March 19 | vs. Wisconsin* | | Jack Shea Arena • Lake Placid, New York (National Semifinal) | Cropper | W 2–1 | 28–0 (21–0) |
| March 21 | vs. Clarkson* | | Jack Shea Arena • Lake Placid, New York (National championship) | Cropper | W 6–4 | 29–0 (21–0) |
*Non-conference game. ^{#}Rankings from USCHO.com Poll. Source:

== Roster and scoring statistics ==
The team roster and scoring statistics were as follows:

| No. | Name | Year | Position | Hometown | S/P/C | Games | Goals | Assists | Pts | PIM |
|---|---|---|---|---|---|---|---|---|---|---|
| 14 | Dan Lodboa | Senior | D | Thorold, ON | (Ontario) | 29 | 24 | 37 | 61 | 40 |
| 21 | John Hughes | Senior | C | Toronto, ON | (Ontario) | 28 | 22 | 35 | 57 | 32 |
| 7 | Kevin Pettit | Junior | F | Hamilton, ON | (Ontario) | 28 | 23 | 28 | 51 | 80 |
| 18 | Larry Fullan | Sophomore | C | Toronto, ON | (Ontario) | 29 | 17 | 33 | 50 | 4 |
| 19 | Dick Bertrand | Senior | RW | Connaught Station, ON | (Ontario) | 27 | 17 | 30 | 47 | 0 |
| 9 | Brian McCutcheon | Junior | LW | Toronto, ON | (Ontario) | 29 | 25 | 21 | 46 | 44 |
| 6 | Garth Ryan | Senior | LW | Kirkland Lake, ON | (Ontario) | 29 | 17 | 21 | 38 | 38 |
| 15 | Steve Giuliani | Senior | F/D | Toronto, ON | (Ontario) | 29 | 2 | 22 | 24 | 16 |
| 8 | Bob Aitchison | Junior | F | Ancaster, ON | (Ontario) | 29 | 9 | 22 | 20 | 16 |
| 16 | Bill Duthie | Junior | W/D | Smiths Falls, ON | (Ontario) | 29 | 5 | 11 | 16 | 4 |
| 4 | Gordon Lowe | Senior | D | Toronto, ON | (Ontario) | 26 | 3 | 11 | 14 | 24 |
| 20 | David Westner | Sophomore | C | Toronto, ON | (Ontario) | 29 | 5 | 7 | 12 | 10 |
| 12 | Jim Higgs | Sophomore | D | Huntsville, ON | (Ontario) | 27 | 4 | 6 | 10 | 12 |
| 11 | Craig Brush | Sophomore | C | Milton, ON | (Ontario) | 28 | 2 | 11 | 13 | 42 |
| 10 | Doug Stewart | Sophomore | LW | Don Mills, ON | (Ontario) | 23 | 2 | 2 | 4 | 11 |
| 2 | Ron Simpson | Sophomore | D | Islington, ON | (Ontario) | 18 | 1 | 3 | 4 | 14 |
| 17 | Ed Ambis | Sophomore | RW | Buffalo, NY | (New York (state)) | 25 | 1 | 2 | 3 | 2 |
| 22 | Ian Orr | Senior | D | Port Credit, ON | (Ontario) | 0 | 0 | 0 | 0 | 0 |
| | Richard Fullan | Senior | D | Toronto, ON | (Ontario) | 0 | 0 | 0 | 0 | 0 |
| 5 | Bill Perras | Junior | D | Oakville, ON | (Ontario) | 3 | 0 | 0 | 0 | 0 |
| 3 | Mark Davis | Sophomore | D | Don Mills, ON | (Ontario) | 11 | 0 | 0 | 0 | 4 |
| 1 | Bob Rule | Junior | G | Manhasset, NY | (New York (state)) | 3 | 0 | 0 | 0 | 0 |
| 1 | Brian Cropper | Junior | G | Toronto, ON | (Ontario) | 29 | 0 | 0 | 0 | 0 |
| Total | | | | | | | 179 | 302 | 470 | 393 |

== Goaltending statistics ==
| No. | Name | Games | Minutes | Wins | Losses | Ties | Goals against | Saves | Shut outs | SV % | GAA |
|---|---|---|---|---|---|---|---|---|---|---|---|
| 1 | Brian Cropper | 29 | 1710 | 29 | 0 | 0 | 53 | 612 | 2 | .921 | 1.86 |
| 1 | Bob Rule | 3 | 37 | 0 | 0 | 0 | 3 | 11 | 0 | .786 | 4.86 |
| Total | | 29 | 1747 | 29 | 0 | 0 | 56 | 623 | 3 | .918 | 1.92 |

== 1970 championship game ==
=== (E1) Cornell vs. (E2) Clarkson ===
| March 21 | Cornell | 6 – 4 | Clarkson | Olympic Arena |

Scoring summary
| Period | Team | Goal | Assist(s) | Time | Score |
|---|---|---|---|---|---|
| 1st | CLK | Luc St. Jean | Kemp and Magnusson | 0:20 | 1–0 CLK |
| 1st | COR | Larry Fullan | Giuliani | 4:22 | 1–1 |
| 1st | COR | Garth Ryan - PP | unassisted | 11:22 | 2–1 COR |
| 1st | CLK | Jerry Kemp - PP | St. Jean and Magnusson | 17:27 | 2–2 |
| 2nd | CLK | Bill O'Flaherty | Halme and Maki | 29:13 | 3–2 CLK |
| 2nd | COR | David Westner | Fullan and Ryan | 33:31 | 3–3 |
| 3rd | COR | Dan Lodboa - PP | McCutcheon and Giuliani | 45:03 | 4–3 COR |
| 3rd | COR | Dan Lodboa - GW SH | unassisted | 47:58 | 5–3 COR |
| 3rd | COR | Dan Lodboa | McCutcheon | 52:17 | 6–3 COR |
| 3rd | CLK | Steve Warr | Kemp | 53:29 | 6–4 COR |
Penalty summary
| Period | Team | Player | Penalty | Time | PIM |
| 1st | CLK | Wayne LaChance | Tripping | 9:54 | 2:00 |
| 1st | CLK | David Westner | Tripping | 11:34 | 2:00 |
| 1st | COR | Garth Ryan | High–Sticking | 16:58 | 2:00 |
| 1st | COR | Ronald Simpson | Tripping | 17:14 | 2:00 |
| 2nd | CLK | Greg Lewis | Cross–Checking | 25:37 | 2:00 |
| 2nd | CLK | Alf Maki | Tripping | 27:32 | 2:00 |
| 2nd | COR | Robert Aitchison | Tripping | 37:50 | 2:00 |
| 2nd | COR | Dan Lodboa | Tripping | 39:44 | 2:00 |
| 3rd | CLK | Steve Warr | Tripping | 44:28 | 2:00 |
| 3rd | COR | David Westner | Tripping | 46:01 | 2:00 |
| 3rd | COR | Gordon Lowe | Cross–Checking | 47:42 | 2:00 |
| 3rd | COR | Ronald Simpson | Cross–Checking | 51:56 | 2:00 |
| 3rd | CLK | Keith McLean | High–Sticking | 51:56 | 2:00 |
| 3rd | COR | John Hughes | Tripping | 57:34 | 2:00 |

Shots by period
| Team | 1 | 2 | 3 | T |
|---|---|---|---|---|
| Clarkson | 7 | 6 | 6 | 19 |
| Cornell | 17 | 17 | 12 | 46 |

Goaltenders
| Team | Name | Saves | Goals against | Time on ice |
|---|---|---|---|---|
| CLK | Bruce Bullock | 40 | 6 | 59:00 |
| COR | Brian Cropper | 15 | 4 | 60:00 |
