= List of Cornell Big Red men's ice hockey seasons =

This is a season-by-season list of records compiled by Cornell in men's ice hockey.

Cornell University has won two NCAA national titles, and is the only Division I national champion to complete a season undefeated, doing so in 1970.

== Season-by-season results ==
Note: GP = Games played, W = Wins, L = Losses, T = Ties

NCAA D-I Champions	NCAA Frozen Four	Conference regular season champions	Division champions	Conference Playoff Champions

Season	Conference	Regular Season (Note: Code explanation; GP—Games Played, W—Wins, L—Losses, T—Tied games, OTW—Overtime Wins, OTL—Overtime Loses, 3/SW—Win in 3 on 3 overtime or shootout, Pts—Points*)														Conference Tournament Results	National Tournament Results
Season	Conference	Conference									Overall					Conference Tournament Results	National Tournament Results
Season	Conference	GP	W	L	T	OTW	OTL	3/SW	Pts*	Finish	GP	W	L	T	%	Conference Tournament Results	National Tournament Results
No Coach (1899 — 1900)
1899–1900	Independent	–	–	–	–	–	–	–	–	–	1	0	1	0	.000		
G. A. Smith (1900 — 1901)
1900–01	Independent	–	–	–	–	–	–	–	–	–	3	3	0	0	1.000		
No Coach (1901 — 1909)
1901–02	Independent	–	–	–	–	–	–	–	–	–	1	0	1	0	.000		
1902–03	Independent	–	–	–	–	–	–	–	–	–	2	1	1	0	.500		
1903–04	Independent	–	–	–	–	–	–	–	–	–	1	0	1	0	.000		
Program Suspended
1906–07	Independent	–	–	–	–	–	–	–	–	–	2	2	0	0	1.000		
1907–08	Independent	–	–	–	–	–	–	–	–	–	4	4	0	0	1.000		
1908–09	Independent	–	–	–	–	–	–	–	–	–	7	2	4	1	.357		
Talbot Hunter (1909 — 1912)
1909–10	IHA	4	2	2	0	–	–	–	.500	3rd	7	3	4	0	.429		
1910–11	IHA	5	5	0	0	–	–	–	1.000	1st	10	10	0	0	1.000		Intercollegiate Champion
1911–12	IHA	4	1	3	0	–	–	–	.250	4th	10	3	7	0	.300		
Edmund Magner (1912 — 1913)
1912–13	IHA	2	0	2	0	–	–	–	.000	3rd	7	0	7	0	.000		
E. J. Sawyer (1913 — 1914)
1913–14	Independent	–	–	–	–	–	–	–	–	–	5	1	4	0	.200		
Talbot Hunter (1914 — 1916)
1914–15	Independent	–	–	–	–	–	–	–	–	–	4	1	3	0	.250		
1915–16	Independent	–	–	–	–	–	–	–	–	–	2	1	1	0	.500		
Program suspended
Nick Bawlf (1920 — 1947)
1920–21	Independent	–	–	–	–	–	–	–	–	–	5	3	2	0	.600		
1921–22	Independent	–	–	–	–	–	–	–	–	–	5	4	1	0	.800		
1922–23	Independent	–	–	–	–	–	–	–	–	–	6	0	4	2	.167		
1923–24	Independent	–	–	–	–	–	–	–	–	–	4	2	2	0	.500		
1924–25	Independent	–	–	–	–	–	–	–	–	–	5	1	4	0	.200		
1925–26	Independent	–	–	–	–	–	–	–	–	–	6	2	4	0	.333		
1926–27	Independent	–	–	–	–	–	–	–	–	–	7	1	6	0	.143		
1927–28	Independent	–	–	–	–	–	–	–	–	–	5	2	3	0	.400		
1928–29	Independent	–	–	–	–	–	–	–	–	–	5	2	3	0	.400		
1929–30	Independent	–	–	–	–	–	–	–	–	–	6	4	2	0	.667		
1930–31	Independent	–	–	–	–	–	–	–	–	–	5	3	2	0	.600		
Program suspended
1933–34	Independent	–	–	–	–	–	–	–	–	–	2	0	1	1	.250		
1934–35	Independent	–	–	–	–	–	–	–	–	–	4	2	2	0	.500		
1935–36	Independent	–	–	–	–	–	–	–	–	–	4	1	2	1	.375		
1936–37	Independent	–	–	–	–	–	–	–	–	–	2	1	1	0	.500		
1937–38	Independent	–	–	–	–	–	–	–	–	–	4	0	4	0	.000		
1938–39	Independent	–	–	–	–	–	–	–	–	–	6	2	4	0	.333		
1939–40	Independent	–	–	–	–	–	–	–	–	–	11	5	6	0	.455		
1940–41	Independent	–	–	–	–	–	–	–	–	–	7	2	5	0	.286		
1941–42	Independent	–	–	–	–	–	–	–	–	–	6	4	2	0	.667		
1942–43	Independent	–	–	–	–	–	–	–	–	–	4	2	2	0	.500		
1943–44	Independent	–	–	–	–	–	–	–	–	–	4	1	3	0	.250		
1944–45	Independent	–	–	–	–	–	–	–	–	–	4	0	4	0	.000		
1945–46	Independent	–	–	–	–	–	–	–	–	–	4	1	3	0	.250		
1946–47	Independent	–	–	–	–	–	–	–	–	–	4	0	4	0	.000		
Arthur Boeringer (1947 — 1948)
1947–48	Independent	–	–	–	–	–	–	–	–	–	4	0	4	0	.000		
Program suspended due to lack of ice
Paul Patten (1957 — 1963)
1957–58	Independent	–	–	–	–	–	–	–	–	–	11	3	7	1	.318		
1958–59	Independent	–	–	–	–	–	–	–	–	–	21	4	16	1	.214		
1959–50	Independent	–	–	–	–	–	–	–	–	–	21	2	19	0	.095		
1960–61	Independent	–	–	–	–	–	–	–	–	–	19	7	12	0	.368		
1961–62	ECAC Hockey	16	11	5	0	–	–	–	.688	8th	18	13	5	0	.722		
1962–63	ECAC Hockey	17	8	9	0	–	–	–	.471	14th	19	9	9	1	.500		
Ned Harkness (1963 — 1970)
1963–64	ECAC Hockey	20	9	10	1	–	–	–	.475	16th	23	12	10	1	.543		
University Division
1964–65	ECAC Hockey	18	13	5	0	–	–	–	.722	5th	26	19	7	0	.731	Lost Quarterfinal, 3–4 (Brown)	
1965–66	ECAC Hockey	18	16	2	0	–	–	–	.889	3rd	27	22	5	0	.815	Won Quarterfinal, 9–0 (Boston College); Won Semifinal, 8–1 (Boston University); Lost Championship, 2–6 (Clarkson)	
1966–67	ECAC Hockey	20	18	1	1	–	–	–	.925	2nd	29	27	1	1	.948	Won Quarterfinal, 11–2 (Brown); Won Semifinal, 12–2 (Boston College); Won Championship, 4–3 (Boston University)	Won Semifinal, 1–0 (North Dakota); Won Championship, 4–1 (Boston University)
1967–68	ECAC Hockey	20	19	1	0	–	–	–	.950	1st	29	27	2	0	.931	Won Quarterfinal, 6–1 (Princeton); Won Semifinal, 7–2 (Boston University); Won Championship, 6–3 (Boston College)	Lost Semifinal, 1–3 (North Dakota); Won Third-place game, 6–1 (Boston College)
1968–69	ECAC Hockey	20	19	1	0	–	–	–	.950	1st	29	27	2	0	.931	Won Quarterfinal, 3–0 (St. Lawrence); Won Semifinal, 3–2 (Boston University); Won Championship, 4–2 (Harvard)	Won Semifinal, 4–3 (Michigan Tech); Lost Championship, 3–4 (Denver)
1969–70	ECAC Hockey	21	21	0	0	–	–	–	1.000	1st	29	29	0	0	1.000	Won Quarterfinal, 8–1 (St. Lawrence); Won Semifinal, 6–5 (Harvard); Won Championship, 3–2 (Clarkson)	Won Semifinal, 2–1 (Wisconsin); Won Championship, 6–4 (Clarkson)
Dick Bertrand (1970 — 1982)
1970–71	ECAC Hockey	20	17	3	0	–	–	–	.850	3rd	27	22	5	0	.815	Won Quarterfinal, 6–3 (Providence); Lost Semifinal, 1–4 (Clarkson); Lost Third-place game, 5–6 (Boston University)	
1971–72	ECAC Hockey	20	17	3	0	–	–	–	.850	1st	29	23	6	0	.793	Won Quarterfinal, 11–1 (Providence); Won Semifinal, 6–3 (New Hampshire); Lost Championship, 1–4 (Boston University)	Won Semifinal, 7–2 (Denver); Lost Championship, 0–4 (Boston University)
1972–73	ECAC Hockey	18	14	3	1	–	–	–	.806	T–1st	29	23	5	1	.810	Won Quarterfinal, 9–3 (Rensselaer); Won Semifinal, 9–4 (Clarkson); Won Championship, 3–2 (Boston College)	Lost Semifinal, 5–6 (Wisconsin); Lost Third-place game, 1–3 (Boston College)
Division I
1973–74	ECAC Hockey	20	13	6	1	–	–	–	.675	4th	27	19	7	1	.722	Won Quarterfinal, 5–3 (St. Lawrence); Lost Semifinal, 3–7 (Boston University); Won Third-place game, 8–2 (Rensselaer)	
1974–75	ECAC Hockey	22	15	6	1	–	–	–	.705	4th	28	17	9	2	.714	Won Quarterfinal, 4–2 (New Hampshire); Lost Semifinal, 4–6 (Harvard); Lost Third-place game, 3–7 (Vermont)	
1975–76	ECAC Hockey	23	13	9	1	–	–	–	.587	5th	29	18	10	1	.638	Won Quarterfinal, 9–7 (Clarkson); Lost Semifinal, 2–6 (Brown); Won Third-place game, 7–6 (Harvard)	
1976–77	ECAC Hockey	23	16	6	1	–	–	–	.717	3rd	29	20	8	1	.707	Won Quarterfinal, 7–5 (Rensselaer); Lost Semifinal, 9–10 (New Hampshire); Won Third-place game, 5–4 (Clarkson)	
1977–78	ECAC Hockey	22	16	5	1	–	–	–	.750	2nd	27	20	6	1	.759	Lost Quarterfinal, 5–8 (Providence)	
1978–79	ECAC Hockey	22	16	2	0	–	–	–	.727	3rd	29	21	8	0	.724	Won Quarterfinal, 6–5 (Providence); Lost Semifinal, 2–4 (New Hampshire); Won Third-place game, 7–4 (Boston University)	
1979–80	ECAC Hockey	22	11	11	0	–	–	–	.500	T–7th	31	16	15	0	.516	Won Quarterfinal, 5–1 (Boston College); Won Semifinal, 6–5 (Providence); Won Championship, 5–1 (Dartmouth)	Lost Semifinal, 4–5 (Northern Michigan); Lost Third-place game, 4–8 (Dartmouth)
1980–81	ECAC Hockey	22	12	9	1	–	–	–	.568	T–6th	31	19	11	1	.629	Won Quarterfinal, 7–4 (Maine); Won Semifinal, 4–3 (Colgate); Lost Championship, 4–8 (Providence)	Lost Quarterfinal series, 7–10 (Northern Michigan)
1981–82	ECAC Hockey	22	10	11	1	–	–	–	.477	T–10th	26	12	13	1	.481		
Lou Reycroft (1982 — 1987)
1982–83	ECAC Hockey	21	10	8	3	–	–	–	.548	9th	26	13	10	3	.558		
1983–84	ECAC Hockey	21	9	12	0	–	–	–	.429	12th	26	11	15	0	.423		
1984–85	ECAC Hockey	21	14	6	1	–	–	–	29	4th	30	18	10	2	.633	Won Quarterfinal series, 2–0 (Yale); Lost Semifinal, 1–5 (Rensselaer); Won Third-place game, 5–3 (Clarkson)	
1985–86	ECAC Hockey	21	13	6	2	–	–	–	28	3rd	32	21	7	4	.719	Won Quarterfinal series, 1–0–1 (Vermont); Won Semifinal, 3–2 (Yale); Won Championship, 3–2 (Clarkson)	Lost Quarterfinal series, 6–7 (Denver)
1986–87	ECAC Hockey	22	8	14	0	–	–	–	16	9th	27	11	16	0	.407		
Brian McCutcheon (1987 — 1995)
1987–88	ECAC Hockey	22	15	7	0	–	–	–	30	3rd	28	19	9	0	.679	Lost Quarterfinal series, 1–2 (Clarkson)	
1988–89	ECAC Hockey	22	13	9	0	–	–	–	26	T–5th	30	16	13	1	.550	Won Quarterfinal series, 1–0–1 (Clarkson); Lost Semifinal, 1–6 (St. Lawrence); Lost Third-place game, 3–6 (Harvard)	
1989–90	ECAC Hockey	22	12	7	3	–	–	–	27	T–3rd	29	16	10	3	.603	Won Quarterfinal series, 2–0 (Harvard); Lost Semifinal, 2–4 (Rensselaer)	
1990–91	ECAC Hockey	22	14	5	3	–	–	–	31	T–2nd	32	18	11	3	.609	Won Quarterfinal series, 2–0 (Colgate); Lost Semifinal, 3–4 (St. Lawrence)	Lost First Round series, 1–2 (Michigan)
1991–92	ECAC Hockey	22	10	8	4	–	–	–	24	T–5th	29	14	11	4	.552	Won Quarterfinal, 3–1 (Yale); Won Semifinal, 4–3 (Clarkson); Lost Championship, 2–4 (St. Lawrence)	
1992–93	ECAC Hockey	22	5	16	1	–	–	–	11	11th	26	6	19	1	.250		
1993–94	ECAC Hockey	22	7	10	5	–	–	–	19	8th	30	8	17	5	.350	Won Preliminary, 5–4 (Princeton); Lost Quarterfinal series, 0–2 (Harvard)	
1994–95	ECAC Hockey	22	8	10	4	–	–	–	20	T–8th	30	11	15	4	.433	Won Preliminary, 6–2 (St. Lawrence); Lost Quarterfinal series, 0–2 (Clarkson)	
Mike Schafer (1995 — 2025)
1995–96	ECAC Hockey	22	14	4	4	–	–	–	31	4th	34	21	9	4	.676	Won Quarterfinal series, 2–0 (Colgate); Won Semifinal, 3–0 (Clarkson); Won Championship, 2–1 (Harvard)	Lost Regional Quarterfinal, 4–5 (Lake Superior State)
1996–97	ECAC Hockey	22	14	6	2	–	–	–	30	2nd	35	21	9	5	.671	Won Quarterfinal series, 1–0–1 (Harvard); Won Semifinal, 5–3 (Rensselaer); Won Championship, 2–1 (Clarkson)	Won Regional Quarterfinal, 4–2 (Miami); Lost regional semifinal, 2–6 (North Dakota)
1997–98	ECAC Hockey	22	9	12	1	–	–	–	19	8th	33	15	16	2	.485	Won First Round series, 2–1 (Rensselaer); Lost Four vs. Five, 2–6 (Princeton)	
1998–99	ECAC Hockey	22	9	10	3	–	–	–	21	7th	31	12	15	4	.452	Lost First Round series, 0–1–1 (Princeton)	
1999–2000	ECAC Hockey	20	10	9	1	–	–	–	21	T–4th	32	16	14	2	.531	Won First Round series, 2–0 (Harvard); Won Four vs. Five, 4–2 (Clarkson); Lost Semifinal, 2–3 (St. Lawrence); Lost Third-place game, 0–4 (Colgate)	
2000–01	ECAC Hockey	22	11	8	3	–	–	–	25	4th	33	16	12	5	.561	Won First Round series, 2–0 (Princeton); Won Semifinal, 5–2 (Harvard); Lost Championship, 1–3 (St. Lawrence)	
2001–02	ECAC Hockey	22	17	3	2	–	–	–	36	1st	35	25	8	2	.743	Won First Round series, 2–0 (Yale); Won Semifinal, 3–0 (Rensselaer); Lost Championship, 3–4 (Harvard)	Won Regional Quarterfinal, 6–1 (Quinnipiac); Lost regional semifinal, 3–4 (New Hampshire)
2002–03	ECAC Hockey	22	19	2	1	–	–	–	39	1st	36	30	5	1	.847	Won First Round series, 2–0 (Rensselaer); Won Semifinal, 2–0 (Brown); Won Championship, 3–2 (Harvard)	Won Regional Semifinal, 5–2 (Minnesota State); Won Regional Final, 2–1 (Boston College); Lost Semifinal, 2–3 (New Hampshire)
2003–04	ECAC Hockey	22	13	6	3	–	–	–	29	2nd	32	16	10	6	.594	Lost Quarterfinal series, 1–2 (Clarkson)	
2004–05	ECAC Hockey	22	18	2	2	–	–	–	38	1st	35	27	5	3	.814	Won First Round series, 2–0 (Clarkson); Won Semifinal, 3–0 (Vermont); Won Championship, 3–1 (Harvard)	Won Regional Semifinal, 3–2 (Ohio State); Lost Regional Final, 1–2 (Minnesota)
2005–06	ECAC Hockey	22	13	6	3	–	–	–	29	3rd	35	22	9	4	.686	Won Quarterfinal series, 2–0 (Clarkson); Won Semifinal, 2–0 (Colgate); Lost Championship, 2–6 (Harvard)	Won Regional Semifinal, 3–2 (Colorado College); Lost Regional Final, 0–1 (Wisconsin)
2006–07	ECAC Hockey	22	10	8	4	–	–	–	24	T–4th	31	14	13	4	.516	Lost Quarterfinal series, 0–2 (Quinnipiac)	
2007–08	ECAC Hockey	22	12	9	1	–	–	–	25	T–4th	36	19	14	3	.569	Won First Round series, 2–1 (Dartmouth); Won Quarterfinal series, 2–0 (Union); Lost Semifinal, 2–3 (Harvard); Won Third-place game, 4–2 (Colgate)	
2008–09	ECAC Hockey	22	13	6	3	–	–	–	29	2nd	36	22	10	4	.667	Won Quarterfinal series, 2–1 (Rensselaer); Won Semifinal, 4–3 (Princeton); Lost Championship, 0–5 (Yale)	Won Regional Semifinal, 3–2 (Northeastern); Lost Regional Final, 1–4 (Bemidji State)
2009–10	ECAC Hockey	22	14	5	3	–	–	–	31	2nd	34	21	9	4	.676	Won First Round series, 2–0 (Harvard); Won Semifinal 3–0, (Brown); Won Championship, 3–0 (Union)	Lost Regional Semifinal, 2–6 (New Hampshire)
2010–11	ECAC Hockey	22	11	9	2	–	–	–	24	T–4th	34	16	15	3	.515	Won Quarterfinal series, 2–1 (Quinnipiac); Won Semifinal, 3–0 (Dartmouth); Lost Championship, 0–6 (Yale)	
2011–12	ECAC Hockey	22	12	4	6	–	–	–	30	2nd	35	19	9	7	.643	Won Quarterfinal series, 2–0 (Dartmouth); Lost Semifinal, 1–6 (Harvard); Won Third-place game, 3–0 (Colgate)	Won Regional Semifinal, 3–2 (Michigan); Lost Regional Final, 1–2 (Ferris State)
2012–13	ECAC Hockey	22	8	11	3	–	–	–	19	T–9th	34	15	16	3	.485	Won First Round series, 2–0 (Princeton); Lost Quarterfinal series, 1–2 (Quinnipiac)	
2013–14	ECAC Hockey	22	11	7	4	–	–	–	26	4th	32	17	10	5	.609	Won Quarterfinal series, 2–1 (Clarkson); Lost Semifinal, 2–5 (Union)	
2014–15	ECAC Hockey	22	8	11	3	–	–	–	22	7th	31	11	14	6	.452	Lost First Round series, 0–2 (Union)	
2015–16	ECAC Hockey	22	8	8	6	–	–	–	22	T–7th	34	16	11	7	.574	Won First Round series, 2–0 (Union); Lost Quarterfinal series, 1–2 (Quinnipiac)	
2016–17	ECAC Hockey	22	13	4	5	–	–	–	31	3rd	35	21	9	5	.671	Won Quarterfinal series, 2–1 (Clarkson); Won Semifinal, 4–1 (Union); Lost Championship, 1–4 (Harvard)	Lost Regional Semifinal, 0–5 (Massachusetts–Lowell)
2017–18	ECAC Hockey	22	17	3	2	–	–	–	36	1st	33	25	6	2	.788	Won Quarterfinal series, 2–0 (Quinnipiac); Lost Semifinal, 1–4 (Princeton)	Lost Regional Semifinal 1–3, (Boston University)
2018–19	ECAC Hockey	22	13	5	4	–	–	–	30	T–1st	36	21	11	4	.639	Won Quarterfinal series, 2–1 (Union); Won Semifinal, 6–0 (Brown); Lost Championship, 2–3 (OT) (Clarkson)	Won Regional Semifinal, 5–1 (Northeastern); Lost Regional Final, 0–4 (Providence)
2019–20	ECAC Hockey	22	18	2	2	–	–	–	38	1st	29	23	2	4	.862	Tournament Cancelled	
2020–21	ECAC Hockey	Season Cancelled															
2021–22	ECAC Hockey	22	12	6	4	2	1	0	39	4th	32	18	10	4	.625	Lost Quarterfinal series, 1–2 (Colgate)	
2022–23	ECAC Hockey	22	15	6	1	0	1	0	47	3rd	34	21	11	2	.647	Won Quarterfinal series, 2–0 (Clarkson); Lost Semifinal, 0–1 (OT) (Harvard)	Won Regional Semifinal, 2–0 (Denver); Lost Regional Final, 1–2 (Boston University)
2023–24	ECAC Hockey	22	12	6	4	1	2	3	44	2nd	35	22	7	6	.714	Won Quarterfinal series, 2–0 (Harvard); Won Semifinal, 6–3 (Dartmouth); Won Championship, 3–1 (St. Lawrence)	Won Regional Semifinal, 3–1 (Maine); Lost Regional Final, 1–2 (Denver)
2024–25	ECAC Hockey	22	10	8	4	1	0	3	36	6th	36	19	11	6	.611	Won First Round, 5–1 (Yale); Won Quarterfinal series, 2–0 (Colgate); Won Semifinal, 3–2 (OT) (Quinnipiac); Won Championship, 3–1 (Clarkson)	Won Regional Semifinal, 4–3 (Michigan State); Lost Regional Final, 2–3 (OT) (Boston University)
Casey Jones (2025 — Present)
2025–26	ECAC Hockey	22	15	6	1	1	1	1	47	T–2nd	34	22	11	1	.662	Won Quarterfinal series, 2–1 (Harvard); Lost Semifinal, 2–3 (Dartmouth)	Lost Regional Semifinal, 0–5 (Denver)
Totals											GP	W	L	T	%	Championships	
Regular Season											1982	1122	697	163	.607	11 ECAC regular season championships, 1 ECAC Divisional Championship	
Conference Post-season											194	128	62	4	.670	14 ECAC tournament championships	
NCAA Post-season											49	22	27	0	.449	26 NCAA Tournament appearances	
Regular Season and Post-season Record											2225	1272	786	167	.609	2 NCAA National Championships	

* Winning percentage is used when conference schedules are unbalanced.
The Ivy League is not an official ice hockey conference.
