= 1970 NCAA University Division men's ice hockey tournament =

College ice hockey tournament

- Teams: 4
- Finals site: Olympic Arena, Lake Placid, New York
- Champions: Cornell Big Red (2nd title)
- Runner-up: Clarkson Golden Knights (3rd title game)
- Semifinalists: Wisconsin Badgers (1st Frozen Four); Michigan Tech Huskies (6th Frozen Four)
- Winning coach: Ned Harkness (3rd title)
- MOP: Dan Lodboa (Cornell)

The 1970 NCAA Men's University Division Ice Hockey Tournament was the culmination of the 1969–70 NCAA University Division men's ice hockey season, the 23rd such tournament in NCAA history. It was held between March 19 and 21, 1970, and concluded with Cornell defeating Clarkson 6–4. All games were played at the Olympic Arena in Lake Placid, New York.

As of 2026, the 1970 Cornell team is the only undefeated NCAA champion in University Division / Division I history.

== Qualifying teams ==
Four teams qualified for the tournament, two each from the eastern and western regions. The ECAC tournament champion and the two WCHA tournament co-champions received automatic bids into the tournament. An at-large bid was offered to a second eastern team based upon both their ECAC tournament finish as well as their regular season record.

East							West						
Seed	School	Conference	Record	Berth type	Appearance	Last bid	Seed	School	Conference	Record	Berth type	Appearance	Last bid
1	Cornell	ECAC Hockey	27–0–0	Tournament champion	4th	1969	1	Michigan Tech	WCHA	19–10–3	Tournament co-champion	6th	1969
2	Clarkson	ECAC Hockey	23–7–0	At-Large	6th	1966	2	Wisconsin	WCHA	22–10–0	Tournament co-champion	1st	Never

== Format ==
The ECAC champion was seeded as the top eastern team while the WCHA co-champion with the better regular season record was given the top western seed. The second eastern seed was slotted to play the top western seed and vice versa. All games were played at the Olympic Arena. All matches were Single-game eliminations with the semifinal winners advancing to the national championship game and the losers playing in a consolation game.

== Tournament bracket ==
Semifinals; March 19–20
E1	Cornell	2
W2	Wisconsin	1
W1	Michigan Tech	3
E2	Clarkson	4

National championship March 21
E1	Cornell	6
E2	Clarkson	4
Third-place game
W1	Michigan Tech	5
W2	Wisconsin	6

Note: * denotes overtime period(s)

=== Semifinals ===
==== (E1) Cornell vs. (W2) Wisconsin ====
March 19	Cornell	2 – 1	Wisconsin	Olympic Arena	Recap
No Scoring		First period	07:08 - PP - Bob Poffenroth (Heatley)
No scoring		Second period	No scoring
(Westner, Fullan) Garth Ryan - 05:32 (Aitchison) Bill Duthie - GW - 11:01		Third period	No scoring
( 15 saves / 16 shots ) Brian Cropper		Goalie stats	Wayne Thomas ( 36 saves / 38 shots )

==== (W1) Michigan Tech vs. (E2) Clarkson ====
March 20	Michigan Tech	3 – 4	Clarkson	Olympic Arena

=== Consolation Game ===
==== (W1) Michigan Tech vs. (W2) Wisconsin ====
March 21	Michigan Tech	5 – 6	Wisconsin	Olympic Arena	Recap
(Murray, McLeod) Ed Shillington - PP - 15:19		First period	09:13 - Murray Heatley (Poffenroth, Gilchrist)
(Hinton, Mott) Herb Boxer - 09:57 (Grisdale) Ed Shillington - 15:06 (Shillington, Amadio) Al McLeod - PP - 18:45		Second period	02:57 - PP - Bob Poffenroth (unassisted); 19:07 - Murray Heatley (Gilchrist, Poffenroth)
(Chestolowski, Mott) Herb Boxer - 12:48		Third period	04:33 - Jim Young (Poffenroth, Johnston); 13:32 - Murray Heatley (Poffenroth); 15:55 - GW - Murray Heatley (Poffenroth, McFadyen)
(27 saves / 33 shots) Gord McRae		Goalie stats	Wayne Thomas (17 saves / 22 shots)

=== National Championship ===
==== (E1) Cornell vs. (E2) Clarkson ====
March 21	Cornell	6 – 4	Clarkson	Olympic Arena

Scoring summary
Period	Team	Goal	Assist(s)	Time	Score
1st	CLK	Luc St. Jean	Kemp and Magnusson	0:20	1–0 CLK
1st	COR	Larry Fullan	Giuliani	4:22	1–1
1st	COR	Garth Ryan - PP	unassisted	11:22	2–1 COR
1st	CLK	Jerry Kemp - PP	St. Jean and Magnusson	17:27	2–2
2nd	CLK	Bill O'Flaherty	Halme and Maki	29:13	3–2 CLK
2nd	COR	David Westner	Fullan and Ryan	33:31	3–3
3rd	COR	Dan Lodboa - PP	McCutcheon and Giuliani	45:03	4–3 COR
3rd	COR	Dan Lodboa - GW SH	unassisted	47:58	5–3 COR
3rd	COR	Dan Lodboa	McCutcheon	52:17	6–3 COR
3rd	CLK	Steve Warr	Kemp	53:29	6–4 COR
Penalty summary
Period	Team	Player	Penalty	Time	PIM
1st	CLK	Wayne LaChance	Tripping	9:54	2:00
1st	CLK	David Westner	Tripping	11:34	2:00
1st	COR	Garth Ryan	High-sticking	16:58	2:00
1st	COR	Ronald Simpson	Tripping	17:14	2:00
2nd	CLK	Greg Lewis	Cross-checking	25:37	2:00
2nd	CLK	Alf Maki	Tripping	27:32	2:00
2nd	COR	Robert Aitchison	Tripping	37:50	2:00
2nd	COR	Dan Lodboa	Tripping	39:44	2:00
3rd	CLK	Steve Warr	Tripping	44:28	2:00
3rd	COR	David Westner	Tripping	46:01	2:00
3rd	COR	Gordon Lowe	Cross-checking	47:42	2:00
3rd	COR	Ronald Simpson	Cross-checking	51:56	2:00
3rd	CLK	Keith McLean	High-sticking	51:56	2:00
3rd	COR	John Hughes	Tripping	57:34	2:00

Shots by period
Team	1	2	3	T
Clarkson	7	6	6	19
Cornell	17	17	12	46

Goaltenders
Team	Name	Saves	Goals against	Time on ice
CLK	Bruce Bullock	40	6	59:00
COR	Brian Cropper	15	4	60:00

== All-Tournament team ==
- G: Bruce Bullock (Clarkson)
- D: Steve Giuliani (Cornell)
- D: Dan Lodboa* (Cornell)
- F: John Hughes (Cornell)
- F: Rick Magnusson (Clarkson)
- F: Bob Poffenroth (Wisconsin)

* Most Outstanding Player(s)
