= 1970 ECAC Hockey men's ice hockey tournament =

1970 ECAC Men's ice hockey tournament
- Dates: March 10–14, 1970
- Teams: 8
- Finals site: Boston Garden; Boston, Massachusetts
- Champions: Cornell (4th title)
- Winning coach: Ned Harkness (4th title)
- MVP: Bruce Bullock (Clarkson)
- ECAC Men's Ice Hockey Tournaments

The 1970 ECAC Hockey Men's Ice Hockey Tournament was the 9th tournament in league history. It was played between March 10 and March 14, 1970. Quarterfinal games were played at home team campus sites, while the 'final four' games were played at the Boston Garden in Boston, Massachusetts. By reaching the championship game both, Cornell and Clarkson received invitations to participate in the 1970 NCAA University Division Men's Ice Hockey Tournament.

== Format ==
The tournament featured three rounds of play, all of which were single-elimination. The top eight teams, based on conference rankings, qualified to participate in the tournament. In the quarterfinals the first seed and eighth seed, the second seed and seventh seed, the third seed and sixth seed and the fourth seed and fifth seed played against one another. In the semifinals, the highest seed plays the lowest remaining seed while the two remaining teams play with the winners advancing to the championship game and the losers advancing to the third place game.

== Conference standings ==
Note: GP = Games played; W = Wins; L = Losses; T = Ties; Pct. = Winning percentage; GF = Goals for; GA = Goals against

1969–70 ECAC Hockey standings
	Conference							Overall					
	GP	W	L	T	Pct.	GF	GA	GP	W	L	T	GF	GA
Cornell†*	21	21	0	0	1.000	142	39	29	29	0	0	179	56
Clarkson	17	14	3	0	.824	87	51	32	24	8	0	171	107
Boston University	22	17	5	0	.773	120	67	27	20	7	0	149	82
Harvard	20	14	6	0	.700	116	62	25	16	9	0	145	92
Brown	21	14	6	1	.690	104	70	24	15	8	1	117	81
Boston College	21	14	7	0	.667	116	86	26	16	10	0	143	116
New Hampshire	17	9	6	2	.588	98	73	31	19	10	2	172	120
Colgate	17	7	7	3	.500	65	69	24	14	7	3	117	86
St. Lawrence	17	8	9	0	.471	75	83	26	11	15	0	112	124
Providence	19	7	10	2	.421	65	85	25	11	12	2	89	107
Army	13	5	8	0	.385	32	50	25	13	12	0	72	79
Yale	22	6	16	0	.273	65	107	24	6	18	0	68	113
Dartmouth	19	5	14	0	.263	80	121	24	9	15	0	101	142
Princeton	21	5	15	1	.262	65	132	23	5	17	1	68	139
Rensselaer	17	3	13	1	.206	54	103	24	8	15	1	85	128
Pennsylvania	15	3	12	0	.200	46	80	24	8	16	0	88	114
Northeastern	17	1	16	0	.059	51	105	23	3	20	0	80	138
Championship: Cornell † indicates conference regular season champion * indicates conference tournament champion

== Bracket ==
Teams are reseeded after the first round

Quarterfinals; March 10
1	Cornell	6
8	St. Lawrence	1
2	Clarkson	6*
7	Brown	5
3	Boston University	2
6	New Hampshire	0
4	Boston College	5
5	Harvard	10

Semifinals; March 13
1	Cornell	6
5	Harvard	5
2	Clarkson	5
3	Boston University	4

Championship; March 14
1	Cornell	3
2	Clarkson	2
Third Place
3	Boston University	8
5	Harvard	2

Note: * denotes overtime period(s)

=== Quarterfinals ===
==== (1) Cornell vs. (8) St. Lawrence ====
March 10	Cornell	6 – 1	St. Lawrence	Lynah Rink

==== (2) Clarkson vs. (7) Brown ====
March 10	Clarkson	6 – 5	OT	Brown	Clarkson Arena

==== (3) Boston University vs. (6) New Hampshire ====
March 10	Boston University	2 – 0	New Hampshire	Boston Arena

==== (4) Boston College vs. (5) Harvard ====
March 10	Boston College	4 – 3	Harvard	McHugh Forum

=== Semifinals ===
==== (1) Cornell vs. (5) Harvard ====
March 13	Cornell	6 – 5	Harvard	Boston Garden

==== (2) Clarkson vs. (3) Boston University ====
March 13	Clarkson	5 – 4	Boston University	Boston Garden

=== Third Place ===
==== (3) Boston University vs. (5) Harvard ====
March 14	Boston University	8 – 2	Harvard	Boston Garden

=== Championship ===
==== (1) Cornell vs. (2) Clarkson ====
March 14	Cornell	3 – 2	Clarkson	Boston Garden	Recap
(Fullan, Bertrand) Garth Ryan - 01:47		First period	01:08 - Jerry Kemp (St. Jean, Magnusson); 15:48 - PP - Steve Warr (Maki, Halme)
(Stewart, Brush) Ed Ambis - 12:38		Second period	No scoring
(Lodboa, Pettit) John Hughes - GW - 19:46		Third period	No scoring
( 19 saves / 21 shots ) Brian Cropper		Goalie stats	Bruce Bullock ( 48 saves / 51 shots )

== Tournament awards ==
=== All-Tournament Team ===
==== First Team ====
- F Joe Cavanagh* (Harvard)
- F Kevin Pettit (Cornell)
- F Dick Toomey (Boston University)
- D Dan Lodboa (Cornell)
- D Steve Warr (Clarkson)
- G Bruce Bullock (Clarkson)

* Most Outstanding Player(s)

==== Second Team ====
- F George McManama (Harvard)
- F John Halme (Clarkson)
- F Larry Davenport (Boston University)
- D Wayne LaChance (Clarkson)
- D Mike Hyndman (Boston University)
- G Bruce Durno (Harvard)
- G Brian Cropper (Cornell)
