= Dan Lodboa =

Canadian ice hockey player (1946–2019)

- Born: September 25, 1946 Thorold, Ontario, Canada
- Died: May 11, 2019 (aged 72) Thorold, Ontario, Canada
- Height: 5 ft 9 in (175 cm)
- Weight: 175 lb (79 kg; 12 st 7 lb)
- Position: Right wing
- Shot: Left
- Played for: Chicago Cougars
- Playing career: 1970–1974

Daniel Stephen Lodboa (September 25, 1946 – May 11, 2019) was a Canadian professional ice hockey player who played 58 games in the World Hockey Association. Born in Thorold, Ontario, he played with the Chicago Cougars.

Lodboa was a tri-captain of the 1969-1970 Cornell men's ice hockey team, the only team in NCAA history to complete a season with a perfect record, going 29-0. He was the first defenseman to ever become the top Cornell scorer for a season, with 61 points on 24 goals and 37 assists in 1970. Over this three-year varsity career he accounted for 134 points (52-82). He was named The Cornell Daily Sun Athlete of the Year for 1969-70. Lodboa's career highlight is scoring a natural hat trick in the third period of the championship game in 1970, winning the tournament MOP in the process. Lodboa died on May 11, 2019, at the age of 72.

== Career statistics ==
=== Regular season and playoffs ===
			Regular season					Playoffs
Season	Team	League	GP	G	A	Pts	PIM	GP	G	A	Pts	PIM
1967–68	Cornell University	ECAC	29	12	24	36	16	––	––	––	––	––
1968–69	Cornell University	ECAC	29	16	21	37	30	––	––	––	––	––
1969–70	Cornell University	ECAC	29	24	37	61	40	––	––	––	––	––
1970–71	Dallas Black Hawks	CHL	71	40	29	69	19	8	1	2	3	0
1971–72	Dallas Black Hawks	CHL	64	20	23	43	24	12	3	2	5	7
1972–73	Chicago Cougars	WHA	58	15	18	33	16	––	––	––	––	––
1973–74	Suncoast Suns	SHL	24	12	19	31	10	––	––	––	––	––
1973–74	Long Island Cougars	NAHL	30	12	16	28	21	17	4	2	6	4
WHA totals			58	15	18	33	16	—	—	—	—	—

== Awards and honors ==
Award	Year
All-Ivy League Second Team	1968-69
All-Ivy League First Team	1969–70
All-ECAC Hockey First Team	1969–70
AHCA East All-American	1969–70
ECAC Hockey All-Tournament First Team	1970
NCAA All-Tournament Team	1970

Awards and achievements
Preceded by Keith Magnuson	NCAA Tournament Most Outstanding Player; 1970	Succeeded by Dan Brady
