= 1970 WCHA men's ice hockey tournament =

1970 WCHA Men's ice hockey tournament
- Dates: March 12–14, 1970
- Teams: 8
- Finals site: Duluth Arena Auditorium; Duluth, Minnesota; DU Arena; Denver, Colorado
- Champions: Michigan Tech† (5th title); Wisconsin‡ (1st title)
- Winning coach: John MacInnes (5th title); Bob Johnson (1st title)
- WCHA Men's Ice Hockey Tournaments

The 1970 WCHA men's ice hockey tournament was the 11th conference playoff in league history. The tournament was played between March 12 and March 14, 1970. All East Regional games were played at the Duluth Arena Auditorium in Duluth, Minnesota, while West Regional games were held at the DU Arena in Denver, Colorado. By winning the regional tournaments, both the East Regional Champion†, Michigan Tech, and West Regional Champion‡, Wisconsin, were invited to participate in the 1970 NCAA University Division men's ice hockey tournament.

== Format ==
The top eight teams in the WCHA, according to their final conference standings, were eligible for the tournament and were seeded No. 1 through No. 8. The eight teams were then divided into two separate groups by placing all even-numbered seeds in one group (2, 4, 6, 8) and the odd-numbered seeds (1, 3, 5, 7) in the other group. Using the location of the top seeds in each of the groups, the odd-numbered group (containing Minnesota) was placed in the east region which was held at the Duluth Arena Auditorium while the odd-numbered grouping (containing Denver) was placed in the west region which was held at the DU Arena. Once each regional group was set the teams were reseeded No. 1 to No. 4 according to their final conference standings. Because Minnesota-Duluth was placed in the West Region despite their building hosting the East Region they were swapped with the equivalent seed (Michigan State) in the East Region to allow them to play in their home venue. In the first round the first and fourth seeds and the second and third seeds in each region were matched in a single game with the winners advancing to their regional final games. The winners of the two championship games were declared as co-conference tournament champions.

=== Conference standings ===
Note: GP = Games played; W = Wins; L = Losses; T = Ties; PCT = Winning percentage; GF = Goals for; GA = Goals against

1969–70 Western Collegiate Hockey Association standings
	Conference							Overall					
	GP	W	L	T	PCT	GF	GA	GP	W	L	T	GF	GA
Minnesota†	26	18	8	0	.692	106	86	33	21	12	0	122	112
Denver	22	13	8	1	.614	96	78	32	21	10	1	153	107
Michigan Tech*	22	12	7	3	.614	98	79	34	19	12	3	148	127
Wisconsin*	22	12	10	0	.545	84	72	34	23	11	0	151	98
North Dakota	26	12	13	1	.481	98	114	30	14	15	1	115	131
Michigan	24	11	13	0	.458	106	104	30	14	16	0	133	122
Michigan State	22	10	12	0	.455	86	92	29	13	16	0	112	124
Minnesota-Duluth	24	10	13	1	.438	89	93	29	13	15	1	118	107
Colorado College	20	3	17	0	.150	70	115	30	7	22	1	117	154
Championship: Michigan Tech, Wisconsin † indicates conference regular season champion * indicates conference tournament champion

== Bracket ==
Regional semifinals March 12–13
E1	Minnesota	3*
E4	Minnesota-Duluth	2
East Regional
E2	Michigan Tech	5
E3	North Dakota	3
W1	Denver	6
W4	Michigan State	2
West Regional
W2	Wisconsin	2
W3	Michigan	1

Regional Finals; March 14
E1	Minnesota	5
E2	Michigan Tech	6
W1	Denver	2
W2	Wisconsin	3

Note: * denotes overtime period(s)

== East Regional ==
=== Semifinals ===
==== (1) Minnesota vs. (4) Minnesota-Duluth ====
March 12	Minnesota	3 – 2	OT	Minnesota-Duluth	Duluth Arena Auditorium

==== (2) Michigan Tech vs. (3) North Dakota ====
March 13	Michigan Tech	5 – 3	North Dakota	Duluth Arena Auditorium

=== Finals ===
==== (1) Minnesota vs. (2) Michigan Tech ====
March 14	Minnesota	5 – 6	Michigan Tech	Duluth Arena Auditorium

== West Regional ==
=== Semifinals ===
==== (1) Denver vs. (4) Michigan State ====
March 12	Denver	6 – 2	Michigan State	DU Arena

==== (2) Wisconsin vs. (3) Michigan ====
March 13	Wisconsin	2 – 1	Michigan	DU Arena

=== Finals ===
==== (1) Denver vs. (2) Wisconsin ====
March 14	Denver	2 – 3	Wisconsin	DU Arena

== Tournament awards ==
None

== See also ==
- Western Collegiate Hockey Association men's champions
