= Olympic Center =

Sports complex in Lake Placid, New York

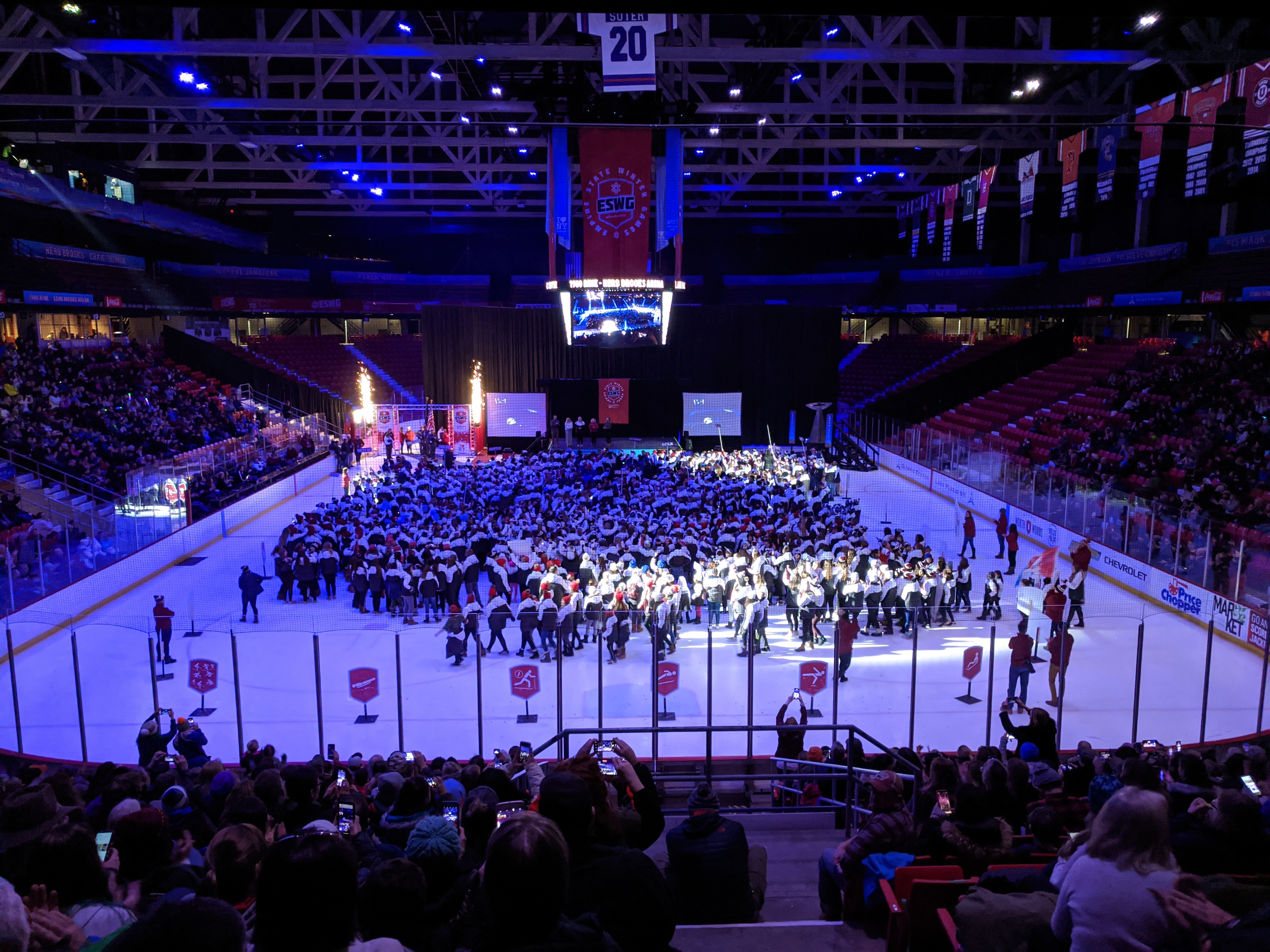
- 1980 rink during the opening ceremony of the 2020 Empire State Winter Games

- Location within the contiguous United States and New York Olympic Center (New York)
- Former names: Olympic Hockey Arena
- Address: 2634 Main Street; Lake Placid, NY 12946
- Coordinates: 44.2832°N 73.9856°W
- Elevation: 540 metres (1,770 ft)
- Owner: New York State Olympic Regional Development Authority
- Type: Sports complex
- Event: Winter sporting events

Construction
- Groundbreaking: August 1931; 95 years ago
- Opened: January 16, 1932; 94 years ago
- Cost: $225,000

Website
- lakeplacidolympicsites.com/olympic-sites/olympic-center/

The Olympic Center is a sports complex in Lake Placid, New York that acted as the Olympic Park for both the 1932 and the 1980 Winter Olympics. The venues inside were the main complex for the 2023 Winter World University Games.

== Venues ==
Olympic Center Venues
List of numbered map items:
1 Conference Center at Lake Placid
2 Herb Brooks Arena
3 Jack Shea Arena
4 James B. Sheffield Olympic Skating Rink
5 USA Rink

=== Current ===
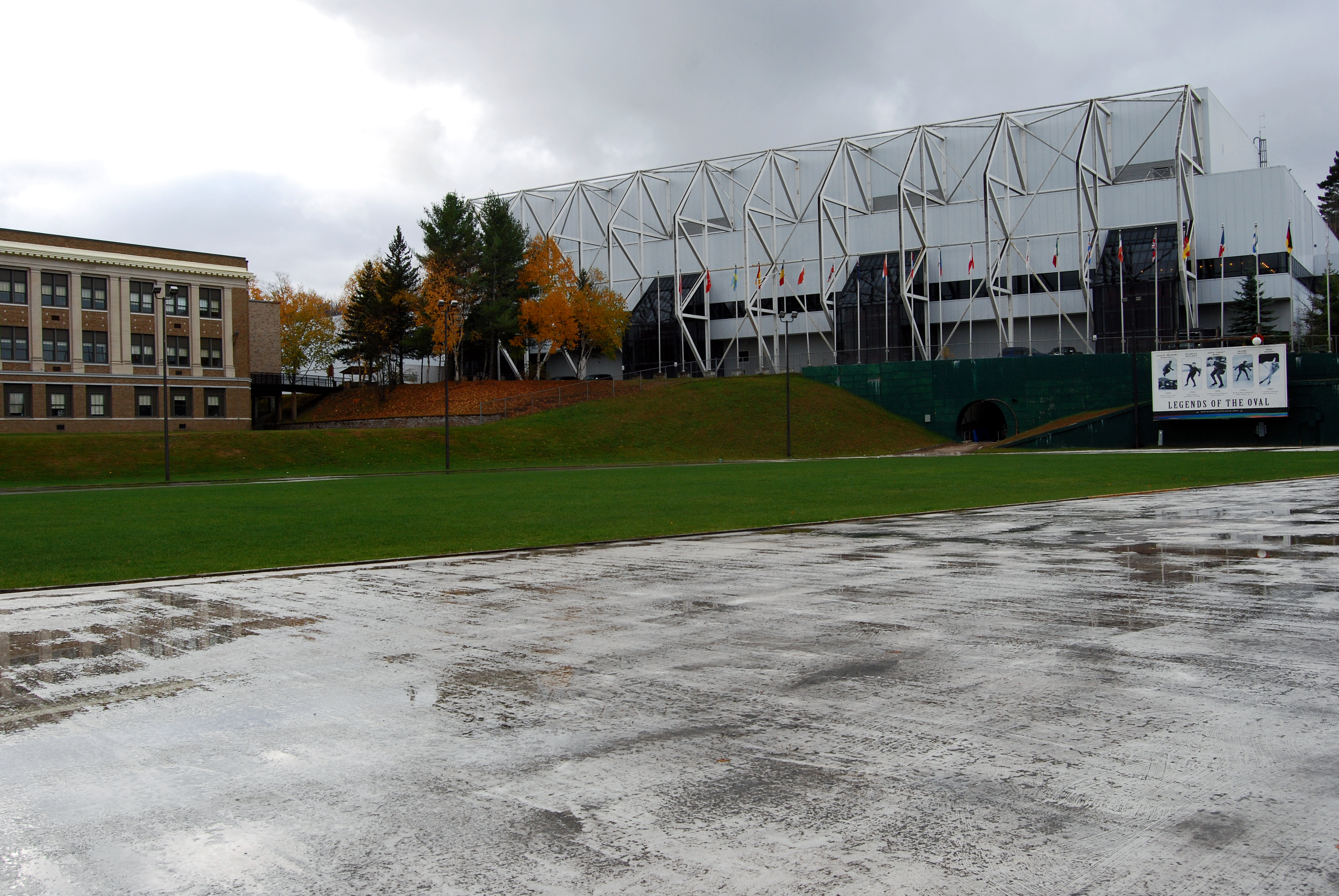
The Herb Brooks Arena was built for the 1980 Winter Olympics.

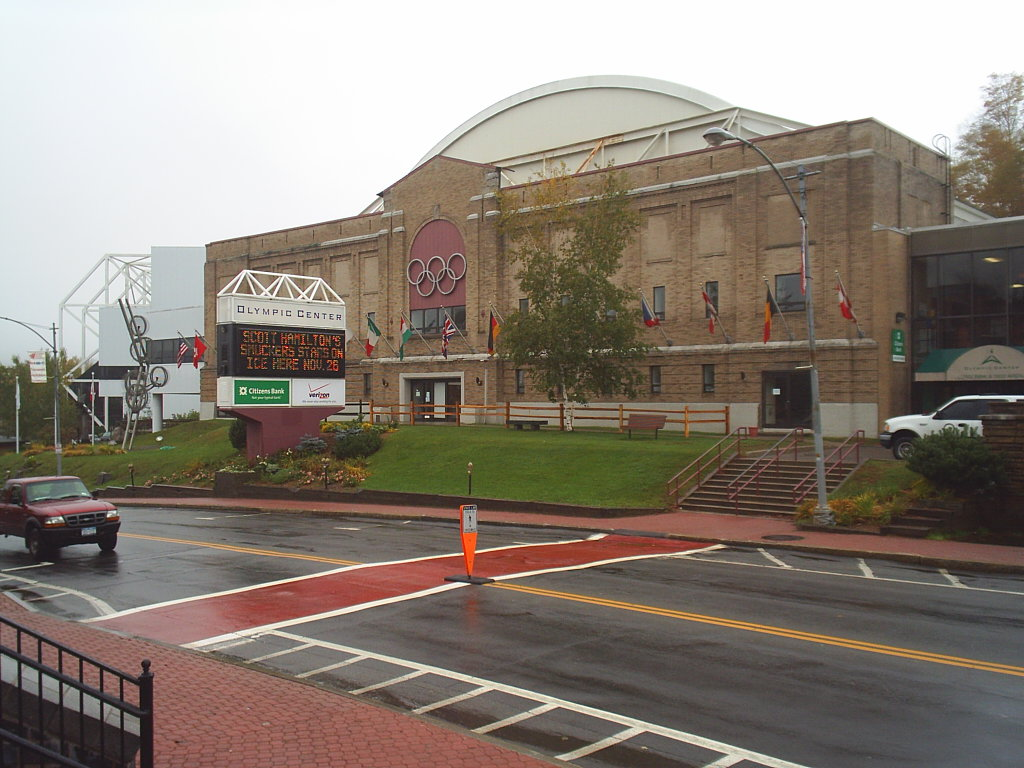
The Jack Shea Arena was built for the 1932 Winter Olympics.

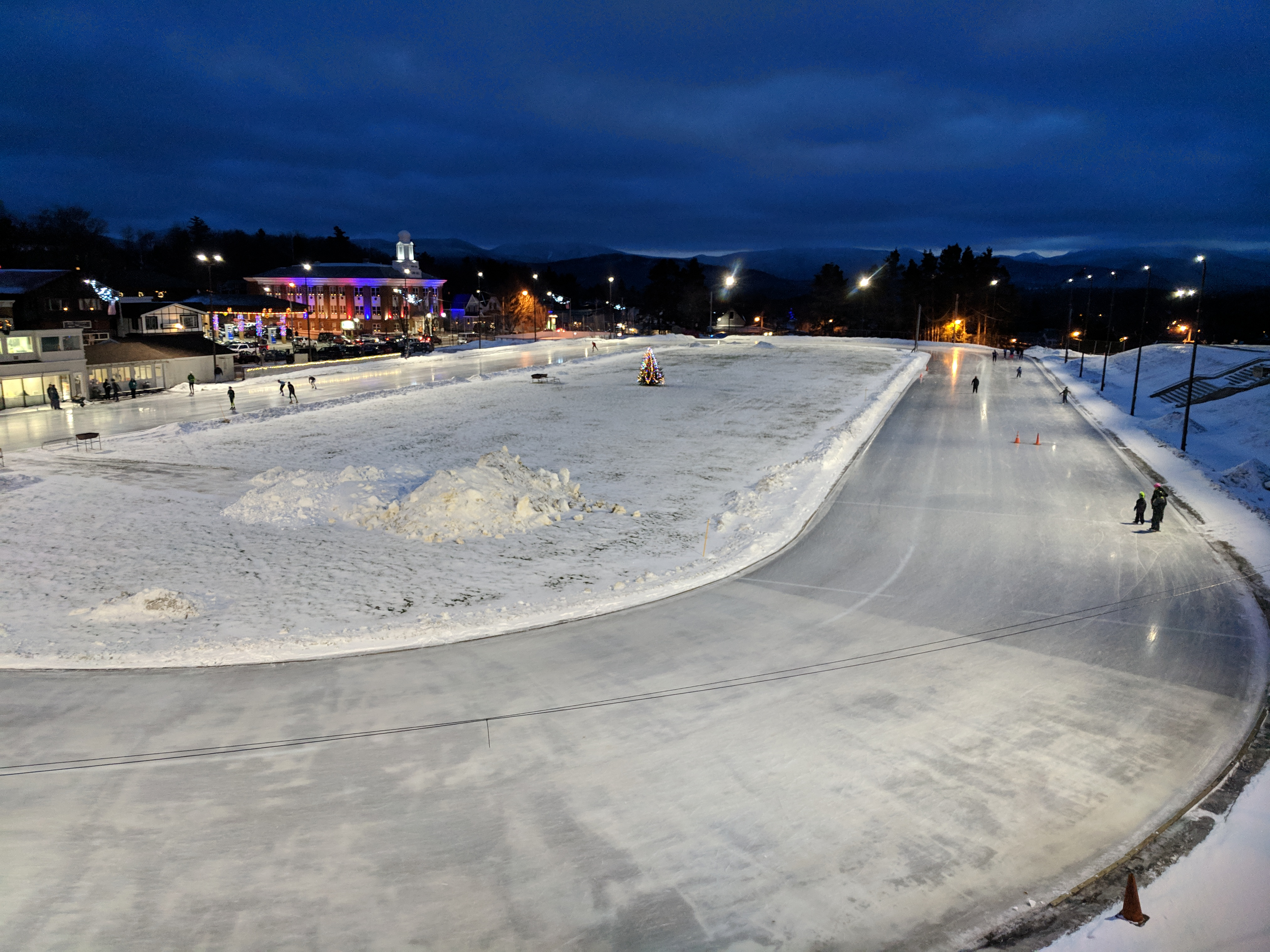
The James B. Sheffield Olympic Skating Rink was built for the 1932 Winter Olympics, hosting speed skating for those games as well as the 1980 Winter Olympics.

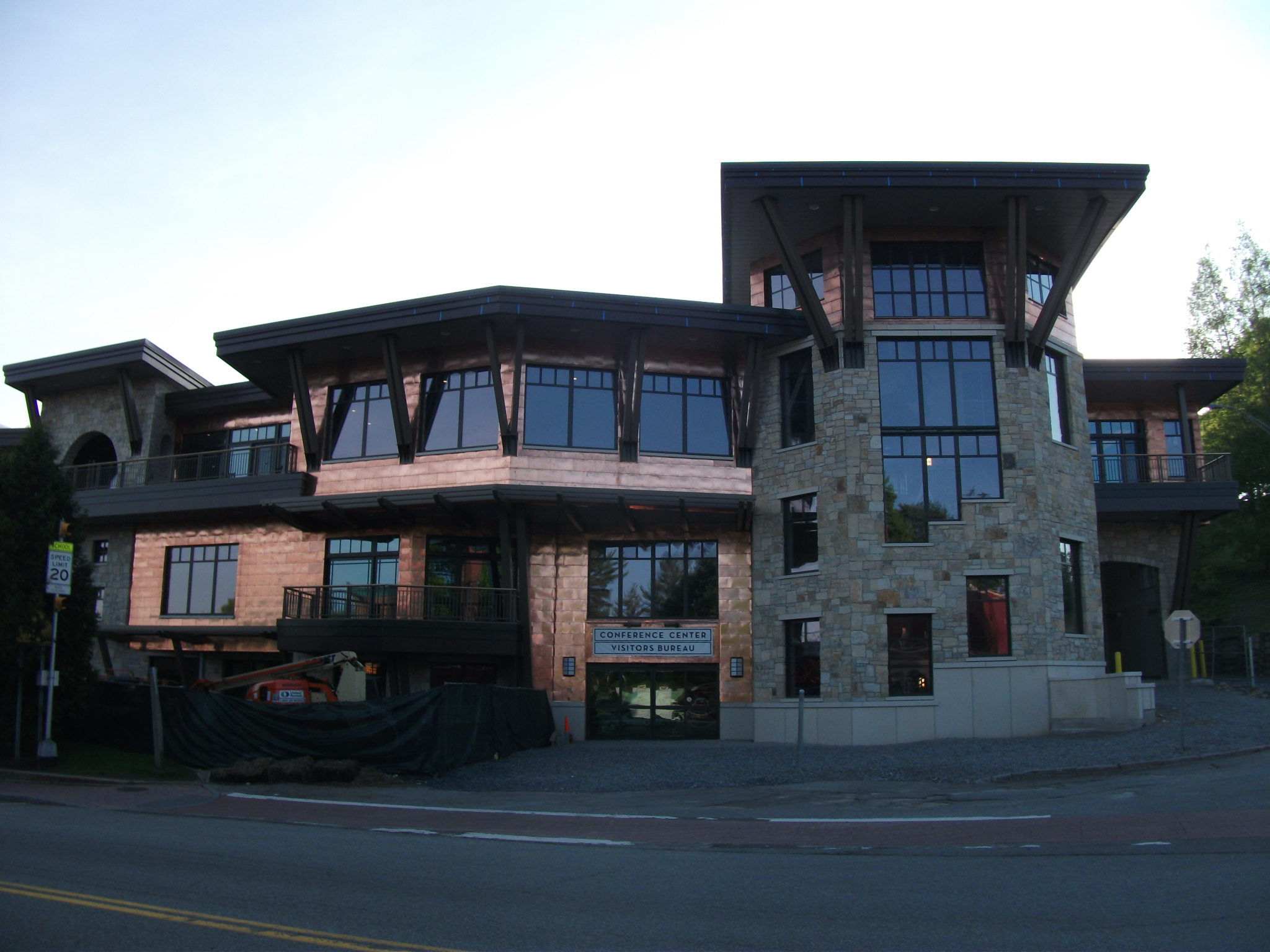
The conference center at the Olympic Center.

- Conference Center at Lake Placid – With 90,000 square feet of flexible meeting space, this convention center was opened in May 2011. It is directly connected to the Jack Shea Arena and the Herb Brooks Arena. Among other features, it is handicapped accessible, has a full-service production kitchen, state-of-the-art lighting systems, stages along with backstage dressing rooms and storage space, loading docks, and a 9,000-square-foot ballroom.
- Herb Brooks Arena – Built for the 1980 Winter Olympics, this venue was formerly known as the Olympic Center arena.
- Jack Shea Arena – Built for the 1932 Winter Olympics, Jack Shea Arena, also known as the 1932 Rink, was the first indoor arena used for the Winter Olympics. For the 1932 Games, it hosted the figure skating competition and six of the twelve ice hockey games.
- James B. Sheffield Olympic Skating Rink – Built for the 1932 Olympics, this outdoor speed skating oval hosted the 1932 and 1980 Olympic speed skating competitions and served as the Olympic Stadium of the 1932 games, and hosted the opening ceremonies of that games. It also hosted other events during the 1932 games, such as Ice hockey and Cross-country skiing.
- USA Rink – One of three ice surfaces at the Olympic Center, this rink was built for the 1980 Winter Olympics.

==== Other facilities ====
- Lake Placid Middle/High School – Located in the heart of the Olympic Center, the school building was utilized in both 1932 and 1980 for the Winter Olympic Games. In 1932 its classrooms and other spaces were used as dressing rooms for athletes competing in the Olympic Center. In 1980 it served as the main press center.
- Lake Placid Winter Olympic Museum – Opened in 1994, the Lake Placid Winter Olympic Museum is a museum dedicated to the Winter Olympics. It is a part of the work of New York State Olympic Regional Development Authority in the Lake Placid Olympic Region. The museum receives between 25,000 and 35,000 visitors annually.

=== Former ===
- Lake Placid Convention Center
  - Lussi Ice Rink – The Lussi Ice Rink was a practice rink and convention space within the former Lake Placid Convention Center. The rink was built for the 1980 games.
- Olympic ticket center – A building was constructed at the Olympic Center along Main Street between the arenas and the speed skating oval to house ticket sales for the 1980 games. It is now a retail space housing a local business.
- North Elba Town Hall – North Elba's town hall, located directly across from the Olympic Center, temporarily acted as a part of the complex during the 1932 games, housing the Olympic Organizing headquarters. It again acted as part of the campus during the 1980 Olympics when it served as the host building for the scoring and official systems and the Lake Placid 1980 Winter Olympic Organizing Committee.

== Use ==
=== Events ===
==== Annual events ====
- Ironman Lake Placid
- Lake Placid Marathon
- The Lake Placid Figure Skating Championships
- The Lake Placid ice dance competition
- Adirondack Winter Invitational
- Winter Empire State Games
- ECAC Men's Hockey Championship

==== Notable events ====
===== Multi-sport competitions =====
- 1932 Winter Olympics
- 1972 Winter Universiade
- 1980 Winter Olympics
- 2000 Winter Goodwill Games
- 2023 Winter World University Games

===== Curling =====
- 1987 United States Men's Curling Championship

===== Figure skating =====
- U.S. Figure Skating Championships: 1965
- U.S. International Figure Skating Classic: 2022
- Skate America: 1979, 1981, 1982, 2009, 2017, 2025

===== Ice hockey =====
- Adirondack Winter Invitational: 2023
- ECAC Hockey men's championship: 1993, 1994, 1995, 1996, 1997, 1998, 1999, 2000, 2001, 2002, 2014, 2015, 2016, 2017, 2018, 2019, 2022, 2023
- Ice Hockey tournament (and Olympic test event) in December 1979
- NCAA Division I Men's Ice Hockey Championship (a.k.a. the Frozen Four): 1970, 1984, 1988
- 2007 NCAA National Collegiate Women's Ice Hockey Tournament

===== Speed skating =====
- 1932 World Allround Speed Skating Championships
- 1978 World Sprint Speed Skating Championships for Men
- 1978 World Sprint Speed Skating Championships for Women
- 1989 World Allround Speed Skating Championships for Women

=== Training ===
The venues in the complex have been used as training centers for United States Olympic athletes.

Dorothy Hamill trained in the Jack Shea Arena prior to her gold medal performance at the 1976 Winter Olympics.

== See also ==
- Lake Placid Olympic Sports Complex
- Venues of the 1932 Winter Olympics
- Venues of the 1980 Winter Olympics
