= Steve Warr (ice hockey) =

Canadian ice hockey player

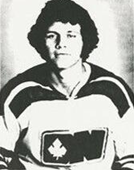
- Warr in 1972 photo
- Born: January 5, 1951 (age 75) Peterborough, Ontario, Canada
- Height: 5 ft 11 in (180 cm)
- Weight: 175 lb (79 kg; 12 st 7 lb)
- Position: Defence
- Shot: Right
- Played for: Ottawa Nationals (WHA); Toronto Toros (WHA)
- NHL draft: 61st overall, 1971; Buffalo Sabres
- Playing career: 1972–1975

Steve Warr (born January 5, 1951) is a Canadian former professional ice hockey defenceman. He was drafted by the Buffalo Sabres of the National Hockey League in the fifth round, 61st overall, of the 1971 NHL entry draft; however, he never played in that league. He played 72 regular-season games and two playoff games in the World Hockey Association with the Ottawa Nationals in the 1972–73 season and two more playoff games with the Toronto Toros in the 1973–74 season.

== Career statistics ==
=== Regular season and playoffs ===
| | | | Regular season | | | | | Playoffs |
| Season | Team | League | GP | G | A | Pts | PIM | GP | G | A | Pts | PIM |
|---|---|---|---|---|---|---|---|---|---|---|---|---|
| 1969–70 | Clarkson University | ECAC | 32 | 6 | 12 | 18 | 48 | — | — | — | — | — |
| 1970–71 | Clarkson University | ECAC | Statistics Unavailable |
| 1971–72 | Clarkson University | ECAC | 30 | 6 | 35 | 41 | 44 | — | — | — | — | — |
| 1972–73 | Ottawa Nationals | WHA | 72 | 3 | 8 | 11 | 79 | 2 | 0 | 0 | 0 | 0 |
| 1972–73 | Clarkson University | ECAC | 30 | 6 | 35 | 41 | 44 | — | — | — | — | — |
| 1973–74 | Jacksonville Barons | AHL | 52 | 5 | 15 | 20 | 38 | — | — | — | — | — |
| 1973–74 | Toronto Toros | WHA | — | — | — | — | — | 2 | 0 | 0 | 0 | 0 |
| 1974–75 | Syracuse Eagles | AHL | 66 | 7 | 21 | 28 | 109 | 1 | 0 | 0 | 0 | 0 |
| WHA totals | | | 72 | 3 | 8 | 11 | 79 | 4 | 0 | 0 | 0 | 0 |

== Awards and honors ==
| Award | Year |
|---|---|
| ECAC Hockey All-Tournament First Team | 1970 |
| All-ECAC Hockey First Team | 1970–71 |
| AHCA East All-American | 1970–71 |
| ECAC Hockey All-Tournament First Team | 1971 |
| All-ECAC Hockey First Team | 1971–72 |
| AHCA East All-American | 1971–72 |
