= Kevin Pettit =

Canadian ice hockey player

- Born: July 7, 1947 (age 79) Cornwall, Ontario, Canada
- Height: 5 ft 8 in (173 cm)
- Weight: 175 lb (79 kg; 12 st 7 lb)
- Position: Left wing
- Played for: Cornell; Port Huron Wings
- NHL draft: Undrafted
- Playing career: 1968–1973

Kevin Pettit is a Canadian retired ice hockey left wing who was an All-American for Cornell.

== Career ==
When Pettit's junior eligibility ended in 1967, he was recruited to play for Cornell University, joining the program on the heels of their first national championship. After a year with the freshman team, Pettit joined the varsity squad and was a major contributor on a team that finished as the runner-up for the 1969 NCAA title. The following season, Pettit helped Cornell complete the only undefeated championship season, winning all 29 games while scoring 51 points, finishing third on the team. Despite the outstanding year, very few Big Red players received any plaudits throughout the season.

Pettit was named team co-captain for his senior season and, due to several players and the head coach having left, the team did not continue their outstanding stretch of nigh-unbeatable hockey. Cornell finished third in ECAC Hockey and did not make an NCAA tournament appearance for the first time in five seasons. Pettit's scoring declined while his penalty minutes ballooned to 111, but he was still named as an All-American.

After graduating, Pettit played briefly in both professional and senior leagues before retiring as a player in 1973.

== Career statistics ==
=== Regular season and playoffs ===
			Regular Season					Playoffs
Season	Team	League	GP	G	A	Pts	PIM	GP	G	A	Pts	PIM
1964–65	Hamilton Red Wings	OHA	2	1	0	1	0	—	—	—	—	—
1965–66	Hamilton Red Wings	OHA	48	9	17	26	58	—	—	—	—	—
1966–67	Hamilton Red Wings	OHA	23	9	8	17	39	—	—	—	—	—
1968–69	Cornell	ECAC Hockey	23	21	17	38	36	—	—	—	—	—
1969–70	Cornell	ECAC Hockey	28	23	28	51	80	—	—	—	—	—
1970–71	Cornell	ECAC Hockey	22	14	23	37	111	—	—	—	—	—
1971–72	Port Huron Wings	IHL	23	5	4	9	16	—	—	—	—	—
1972–73	Brantford Foresters	OHAsr	5	1	2	3	4	—	—	—	—	—
OHA Totals			73	19	25	44	97	—	—	—	—	—
NCAA Totals			73	58	68	126	227	—	—	—	—	—

== Awards and honors ==
Award	Year
All-ECAC Hockey Second team	1970–71
AHCA East All-American	1970–71
