= Brian McCutcheon (ice hockey) =

- Born: August 3, 1949 (age 77) Toronto, Ontario, Canada
- Height: 5 ft 10 in (178 cm)
- Weight: 180 lb (82 kg; 12 st 12 lb)
- Position: Left wing
- Shot: Left
- Played for: Detroit Red Wings; EC Graz
- NHL draft: Undrafted
- Playing career: 1968–1980
- Coaching career

Biographical details
- Education: Cornell

Playing career
- 1968–1971: Cornell
- Position: Forward

Coaching career (HC unless noted)
- 1981–1987: Elmira
- 1987–1995: Cornell
- 1995–1996: Los Angeles Ice Dogs (Assistant)
- 1996–1997: Columbus Chill
- 1997–2000: Rochester Americans
- 2000–2006: Buffalo Sabres (Assistant)
- 2006–2011: Buffalo Sabres (Associate)
- 2011–2012: HC Bolzano (Assistant)
- 2012–2013: HC Bolzano
- 2014–2015: Kölner Haie (Assistant)
- 2015–2016: Füchse Duisburg

Head coaching record
- Overall: 209-167-22 (.553) (College)

Accomplishments and honors

Championships
- 2011–12 Italy Champion

Awards
- 1997 John Brophy Award

Brian Kenneth 'Boom Boom' McCutcheon (born August 3, 1949) is a Canadian former professional ice hockey player who played 37 games in the National Hockey League with the Detroit Red Wings between 1974 and 1976. Since 1981 he has served in a variety of coaching positions spread across many leagues, most recently as head coach for Füchse Duisburg in 2015–16.

== Playing career ==
McCutcheon played minor ice hockey in Toronto, and went to the 1962 Quebec International Pee-Wee Hockey Tournament with the Toronto Shopsy's youth team. He was recruited to play at Cornell under Ned Harkness. In his junior season McCutcheon led his team in goals while the Big Red compiled the first (and thus far only) undefeated national championship in NCAA history. After graduating in 1971 McCutcheon embarked on a professional career. Despite going undrafted, McCutcheon was signed by the Detroit Red Wings. After scoring only 7 points in 45 games across three leagues in 1971-72 McCutcheon settled down with the Virginia Wings in the mid-1970s, eventually receiving a call-up to the parent club. While McCutcheon was a capable minor league player he couldn't adjust to the NHL level, recording only 4 points in 37 games over three seasons with the Wings. He spent the entire 1977-78 season in the CHL before heading overseas to finish his playing career with EC Graz.

== Coaching career ==
=== College ===
A year after hanging up his skates McCutcheon reappeared behind the bench at Elmira, a Division III program. Over six seasons with the Soaring Eagles McCutcheon saw a good amount of success, posting 5 winning records, and an appearance in the 1986 tournament. In 1987 he returned to his alma mater taking over as head coach from Lou Reycroft, becoming the second player from the 1970 team to coach the Big Red (Dick Bertrand being the first).

McCutcheon was tasked with rebuilding Cornell to its former glory after having declined over the previous ten years. The initial years were good, seeing the big Red post five consecutive winning seasons and making the tournament in 1991 but from 1992–93 on the team struggled and finished with three straight losing campaigns.

=== Professional ===
Despite the ending in Ithaca McCutcheon didn't stay idle for long, accepting a position as an assistant with the Los Angeles Ice Dogs for the 1995–96 season. The following year he became the head coach for the Columbus Chill of the ECHL, leading the team to its first division title and receiving the John Brophy Award for his efforts. As further recognition he was promoted to the AHL and coached the Rochester Americans to consecutive Calder Cup finals. McCutcheon eventually made his way back to the NHL, becoming an assistant with the Buffalo Sabres under Lindy Ruff. McCutcheon was named as an associate in 2006 but left the team five years later when his contract was not renewed. Since leaving the NHL McCutcheon has coached several teams in Europe in varying capacities.

== Career statistics ==
=== Regular season and playoffs ===
			Regular season					Playoffs
Season	Team	League	GP	G	A	Pts	PIM	GP	G	A	Pts	PIM
1968–69	Cornell University	ECAC	29	17	22	39	28	—	—	—	—	—
1969–70	Cornell University	ECAC	29	25	21	46	44	—	—	—	—	—
1970–71	Cornell University	ECAC	27	17	24	41	48	—	—	—	—	—
1971-72	Fort Worth Wings	CHL	13	0	1	1	9	—	—	—	—	—
1971-72	Tidewater Wings	AHL	18	1	1	2	2	—	—	—	—	—
1971-72	Port Huron Wings	IHL	14	2	2	4	0	—	—	—	—	—
1972-73	Virginia Wings	AHL	68	23	19	42	64	13	3	1	4	7
1973-74	London Lions	Exhib	71	47	28	75	75	—	—	—	—	—
1974-75	Virginia Wings	AHL	30	12	9	21	24	—	—	—	—	—
1974–75	Detroit Red Wings	NHL	17	3	1	4	2	—	—	—	—	—
1975-76	New Haven Nighthawks	AHL	58	27	19	46	22	—	—	—	—	—
1975–76	Detroit Red Wings	NHL	8	0	0	0	5	—	—	—	—	—
1976-77	Kansas City Blues	CHL	27	11	8	19	12	—	—	—	—	—
1976–77	Detroit Red Wings	NHL	12	0	0	0	0	—	—	—	—	—
1977–78	Kansas City Red Wings	CHL	60	17	16	33	27	—	—	—	—	—
1978–79	EC Graz	AUT	—	—	—	—	—	—	—	—	—	—
AHL totals			174	63	48	111	112	13	3	1	4	7
NHL totals			37	3	1	4	7	—	—	—	—	—

== Head coaching record ==
Record table
Season	Team	Overall	Conference	Standing	Postseason
Elmira Soaring Eagles (ECAC 2) (1981–1985)
1981–82	Elmira	12-17-0	11-11-0	16th	ECAC 2 West Quarterfinals
1982–83	Elmira	14-12-0	14-11-0	12th	ECAC 2 West Quarterfinals
1983–84	Elmira	17-8-1	17-8-0	7th	ECAC 2 West Quarterfinals
1984–85	Elmira	18-9-0	16-7-0	7th	ECAC West Quarterfinals
Elmira:		61-46-1	58-37-0		
Elmira Soaring Eagles (ECAC West) (1985–1987)
1985–86	Elmira	25-7-0	21-4-0	2nd	ECAC West Semifinals
1986–87	Elmira	15-9-0	14-8-0	5th	ECAC West Quarterfinals
Elmira:		40-16-0	35-12-0		
Cornell Big Red (ECAC Hockey) (1987–1995)
1987–88	Cornell	19-9-0	15-7-0	3rd	ECAC Quarterfinals
1988–89	Cornell	16-13-1	13-9-0	t-5th	ECAC Third-place game (loss)
1989–90	Cornell	16-10-3	12-7-3	11th	ECAC Semifinals
1990–91	Cornell	18-11-3	14-5-3	t-2nd	NCAA first round
1991–92	Cornell	14-11-4	10-8-4	t-5th	ECAC Runner-Up
1992–93	Cornell	6-19-1	5-16-1	11th	
1993–94	Cornell	8-17-5	7-10-5	8th	ECAC Quarterfinals
1994–95	Cornell	11-15-4	8-10-4	9th	ECAC Quarterfinals
Cornell:		108-105-21	84-72-20		
Total:		209-167-22			
National champion Postseason invitational champion Conference regular season champion Conference regular season and conference tournament champion Division regular season champion Division regular season and conference tournament champion Conference tournament champion

== Awards and honors ==
Award	Year
All-ECAC Hockey Second Team	1970–71
