= North Dakota Fighting Hawks men's ice hockey =

Ice hockey team in North Dakota

- Current season
- University: University of North Dakota
- Conference: NCHC
- First season: 1927–28
- Head coach: Dane Jackson; 2nd season, 29–10–1 (.738)
- Assistant coaches: Bryn Chyzyk (general manager) Dillon Simpson Matt Smaby
- Captain: Cole Reschny
- Alternate captain(s): Cody Croal Anthony Menghini Mac Swanson
- Arena: Ralph Engelstad Arena; Grand Forks, North Dakota
- Colors: Kelly green and white
- Fight song: Fight On Sioux; It's For You, North Dakota U Stand Up and Cheer

NCAA tournament champions
- 1959, 1963, 1980, 1982, 1987, 1997, 2000, 2016

NCAA tournament runner-up
- 1958, 1968, 1979, 2001, 2005

NCAA tournament Frozen Four
- 1958, 1959, 1963, 1965, 1967, 1968, 1979, 1980, 1982, 1984, 1987, 1997, 2000, 2001, 2005, 2006, 2007, 2008, 2011, 2014, 2015, 2016, 2026

NCAA tournament appearances
- 1958, 1959, 1963, 1965, 1967, 1968, 1979, 1980, 1982, 1984, 1987, 1990, 1997, 1998, 1999, 2000, 2001, 2003, 2004, 2005, 2006, 2007, 2008, 2009, 2010, 2011, 2012, 2013, 2014, 2015, 2016, 2017, 2021, 2022, 2024, 2026

Conference tournament champions
- WCHA: 1967, 1968, 1979, 1980, 1987, 1997, 2000, 2006, 2010, 2011, 2012; NCHC: 2021

Conference regular season champions
- WCHA: 1958, 1963, 1965, 1967, 1979, 1980, 1982, 1987, 1997, 1998, 1999, 2001, 2004, 2009, 2011; NCHC: 2015, 2016, 2020, 2021, 2022, 2024, 2026

The North Dakota Fighting Hawks men's ice hockey team is the college ice hockey team of the University of North Dakota. They are members of the National Collegiate Hockey Conference (NCHC) and compete in National Collegiate Athletic Association (NCAA) Division I ice hockey. North Dakota is widely regarded as a premier college hockey school and has one of the most storied programs in NCAA history. UND has made over 30 appearances in the NCAA tournament, appeared in the Frozen Four 23 times, and has won 8 NCAA Division I Championships. The program has also achieved 15 WCHA Regular Season Championships, 7 NCHC Regular Season Championships, and 12 Conference Tournament Championships. The school's former nickname was the Fighting Sioux,which held a lengthy and controversial tenure before being retired in 2012 due to pressure from the NCAA. The official school nickname is now the Fighting Hawks, the voted name that was chosen by the university on November 18, 2015.

== History ==
=== Early history ===
Varsity ice hockey at the University of North Dakota began in 1946 with John Jamieson as the first coach. The 1946–47 season was the first winning season in UND history with a record of 7 wins, 6 losses, and 0 ties. UND joined Michigan Tech, Colorado College, University of Denver, University of Michigan, Michigan State University, and University of Minnesota as founding members of the Midwest Collegiate Hockey League (MCHL) in 1951. In the program's first season in league play UND finished with a record of 13–11–1. After two seasons the MCHL became the Western Intercollegiate Hockey League (WIHL) and later in 1959 became the Western Collegiate Hockey Association. Artificial ice was installed in UND's Winter Sports Building, commonly known as "The Barn", in 1953.

Bob May became the fifth coach in UND history for the 1957–58 season and led the team to the 1957–58 WIHL Regular season Championship. UND also received a bid to the 1958 NCAA Division I Men's Ice Hockey Tournament. The team advanced to the championship game with a 9–1 win over Harvard in the semi-final round. UND fell in their first championship and post season tournament appearance to University of Denver 2–6. Following the 1957–58 season the WIHL broke up, after Michigan, Michigan State, Michigan Tech, and Minnesota left the conference following a dispute over recruiting practices. Despite not violating the WIHL or the NCAA's rules of the period, the four exiting schools accused Denver, North Dakota and Colorado College of breaking a gentlemen's agreement by recruiting overage Canadians.

=== Thorndycraft era ===
Without a conference UND competed as an independent Division I team for the 1958–59 season. Barry Thorndycraft took over for May as head coach and continued the winning tradition established in the previous season. UND again reached the NCAA tournament for the second straight season and again advanced to the championship with a 4–3 overtime win over St. Lawrence. UND beat former WIHL member Michigan State with another 4–3 overtime victory to win the university's first ice hockey national championship. UND ended with a record of 20–10–1 on the season. 1959 marked the official founding of the Western Collegiate Hockey Association (WCHA) and after three seasons in the WCHA UND returned to the national stage for the 1963 NCAA tournament held in Chestnut Hill, Massachusetts at the McHugh Forum. North Dakota blew away the hometown Boston College Eagles 8–2 and won the school's second ice hockey championship with a 6–5 win over rival Denver. The team finished with a record of 22–7–3 and coach Thorndycraft was named WCHA Coach of the Year for 1962–63.

=== Peters, Selman, Bjorkman years ===
Thorndycraft left the program in 1964 and under new coach R.H. "Bob" Peters, UND won the MacNaughton Cup for the WCHA regular season championship in 1964–65. The team advanced to the 1965 NCAA tournament but lost 3–4 in the semi-final round to Boston College. Bill Selman became coach in 1966 and led the team to their third MacNaughton Cup in history and a spot in the 1967 NCAA tournament. UND's run ended with a loss to Cornell 0–1 but Selman received the 1966–67 WCHA Coach of the Year award. The following season UND received an at-large bid to the 1968 NCAA tournament. North Dakota beat Cornell 4–1 in a rematch of the 1967 semi-final game. UND advanced to the National Championship game for the first time since winning it 5 seasons earlier in 1963. UND again found themselves in the National Championship game matched up with conference rival Denver, North Dakota would fall to the Pioneers 0–4. Rube Bjorkman became the ninth coach in program history after previously serving as head coach at the University of New Hampshire. Over the 10 seasons as coach UND finished with two winning seasons, one in his first season as UND coach in 1968–69 and a second in 1971–72. During his tenure as UND coach Bjorkman compiled a record of 149–186–11.

=== Gasparini era ===
John "Gino" Gasparini was hired in 1978, Gasparini played for UND from 1964 to 1967 before a short stint in the International Hockey League then returning to UND under Bjorkman as an assistant coach. Gasparini's impact was immediate and UND finished the regular season winning the MacNaughton Cup and advancing to the 1979 NCAA tournament. North Dakota picked up a 4–2 victory of Dartmouth in the semi-final round but fell in the national championship game to Minnesota 3–4. North Dakota finished the season with a record of 30–11–1, the program's first 30-win season, as well as Gasparini being named WCHA Coach of the Year. The 30 wins of the 1978–79 season was eclipsed the following season when North Dakota picked up 31 wins and the programs third National Championship with a 5–2 win over Northern Michigan. North Dakota returned to the NCAA tournament in 1984. North Dakota swept Rensselaer two games to none in the quarter-final round but fell 1–2 in overtime to Minnesota-Duluth

The 1986–87 season UND swept through the WCHA winning the MacNaughton Cup and WCHA Final Five Tournament. UND advanced to the 1987 NCAA tournament sweeping St. Lawrence in two games by a combined score of 9–4 and advancing to the Championship with a 5–2 win over Harvard. North Dakota won their fifth NCAA Division I National Championship when UND defeated Michigan State Spartans in front of a Spartan crowd in Detroit, Michigan on March 28, 1987. The team would make the NCAA tournament one more time with Gasparini behind the bench in 1990 but fell in the regional round of the expanded NCAA tournament when the team lost to Boston University two games to one in the best of three series.

=== Blais era ===
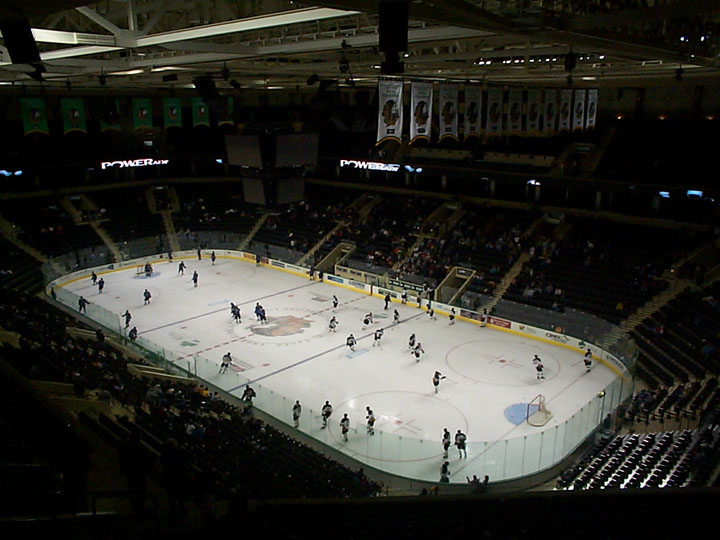
The new Ralph Engelstad Arena in November 2001

After four quiet years, Dean Blais took over as head coach of North Dakota after John "Gino" Gasparini in 1994. In his third season as head coach, Blais led UND to the program's eighth MacNaughton Cup for WCHA regular season champions and fifth Broadmoor Trophy for WCHA playoff champions. UND advanced to the Frozen Four after a 6–2 victory over Cornell in the quarterfinal round. UND then advanced to the National Championship with a 6–2 win over Colorado College. Under Blais, UND won 6–4 over Boston University to win the school's Six National Championship. That same season Blais was named recipient of the Spencer Penrose Award for Division I College Coach of the Year.

North Dakota returned to the NCAA tournament in 1998 and 1999 but were plagued with early-round exits. In the 1999–2000 season, after again winning the WCHA Tournament, UND advanced through the 2000 NCAA tournament to the Championship against Boston College, looking for its first NCAA title since 1949. BC had a 2–1 lead entering the third period, but UND responded with three goals, with two by Lee Goren. Goren tied the game, assisted on Jason Ulmer's game-winning goal, and then scored into an empty Eagles net in the last minute of play to secure the game. It marked North Dakota's seventh national title overall and second since 1997, and was also the third time in three years that BC came up short in the Frozen Four. Boston College got its revenge over UND the following season when the two teams again faced each other in the National Championship. BC won its first national title since 1949 by defeating North Dakota, 3–2, in overtime on a goal scored by sophomore forward Krys Kolanos just 4:43 into OT.

In 2001, the team moved into the new $100 million, 11,500-seat Ralph Engelstad Arena, replacing the aging 6,000-seat Old Ralph Engelstad Arena that served as the home for UND hockey since 1972. After missing the NCAA postseason tournament in 2002, UND returned in 2003. North Dakota fell to Ferris State 2–5 in the opening round of the West Regionals. And in the 2004 NCAA tournament, UND shut out Holy Cross 3–0 before getting shut out 0–1 in the West Regional Final to Denver.

=== Hakstol era ===
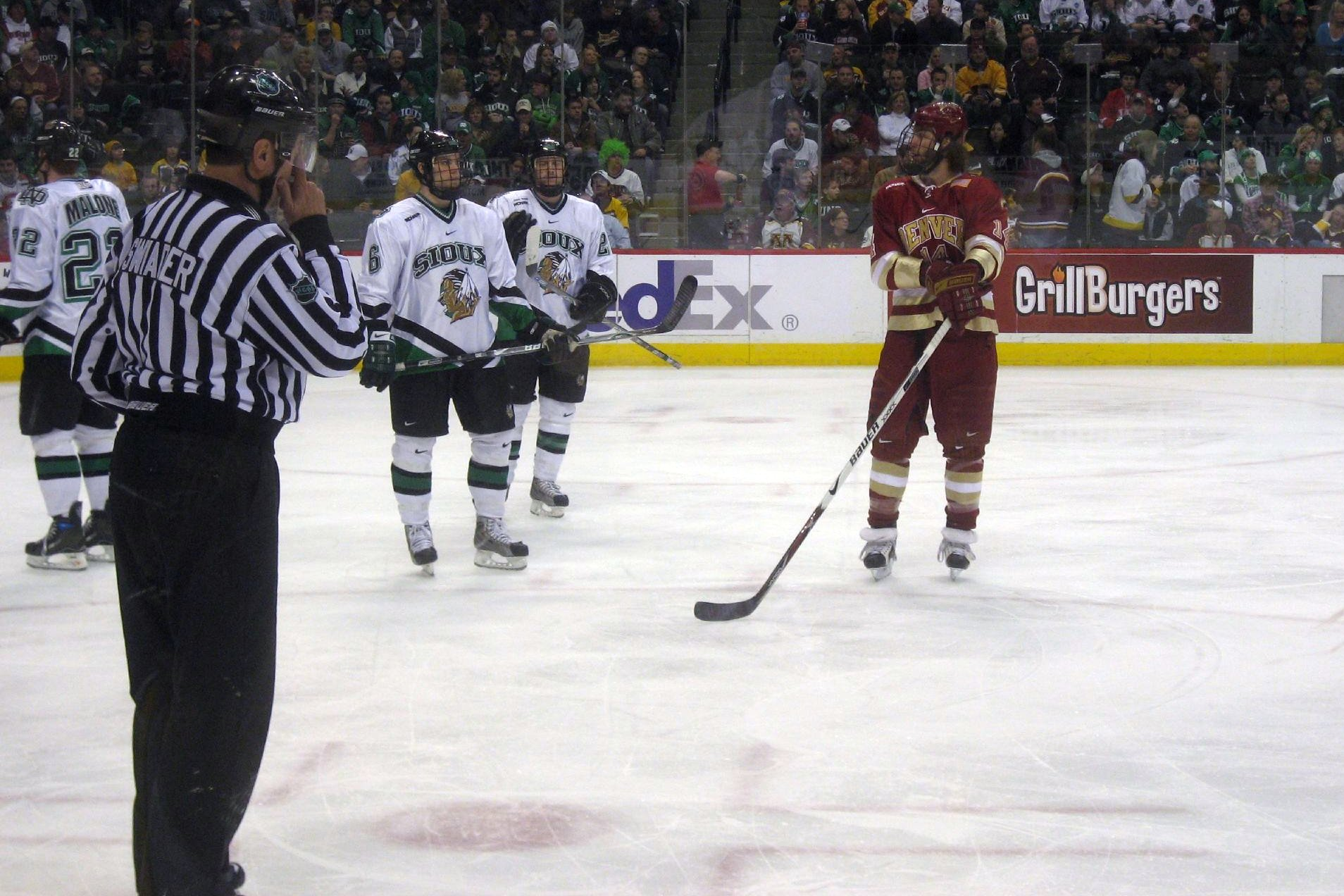
UND vs. Denver in the 2008 WCHA Final Five

On July 9, 2004, Dave Hakstol was announced as the 15th coach in program history, replacing Dean Blais who left UND when he was named associate coach of the Columbus Blue Jackets. Blais served as UND head coach for 10 seasons and placed first among active coaches with a record of 262–115–13 and a .733 winning percentage. With Hakstol behind the bench, UND continued their winning tradition that was prevalent under Blais. UND won 4–3 in overtime vs. Maine on October 8, 2004, to give Hakstol his first win as head coach. UND received an at-large bid to the 2005 NCAA tournament and found themselves in the Championship against long-time rival University of Denver. DU freshman goaltender Peter Mannino backstopped an offensive attack that included a 2-goal game by DU forward Paul Stastny to hand UND a 1–4 loss.

North Dakota made and advanced in the next three NCAA tournaments but came up with third-place finishes in the Frozen Four, losing to Boston College three seasons in a row. In 2006 losing 5–6 to the Eagles, in 2007 falling 4–6, and in 2008 losing 1–6. Despite the third consecutive loss to BC in the Frozen Four, the seasons ended on high notes in 2006–07 when sophomore forward Ryan Duncan became the second UND player to win the Hobey Baker Award and the first in 20 seasons after Tony Hrkac in 1986–87. The 2007–08 season was only the second time in UND Hockey history that North Dakota had two finalists for the Hobey Baker Award when junior forward T. J. Oshie and senior goaltender Jean-Philippe Lamoureux: the other time in 2004 when Zach Parise, Brandon Bochenski were nominated.

In March 2009 UND won a WCHA-leading 14th league championship with a 2–1 win at Wisconsin. The team advanced to the 2009 NCAA tournament but fell in the Northeast Region semifinal to New Hampshire, 5–6 in overtime, after UNH's Thomas Fortney scored with :00.1 remaining in regulation to force OT and UNH's Josh LaBlanc scored 45 seconds into overtime. UND capped off the 2009–10 regular season and won the 2010 WCHA Men's Ice Hockey tournament to receive an automatic bid to the 2010 NCAA tournament. UND fell in the Northeast Regional semifinals to Yale 2–3 after The Bulldogs scored 3 goals in a span of 4:57 during the second period and Yale goaltender Ryan Rondeau stopped 34 UND shots.

In March 2011 UND captured its WCHA-leading 15th league championship with an 11–2 win at Michigan Tech. The team advanced as the #1 seed into the 2011 WCHA tournament by beating #12 seed Michigan Tech (8–0, 3–1). UND advanced to the 2011 WCHA Final Five to play Colorado College in the WCHA semi-final and won with a late third period goal by Matt Frattin to advance them to the WCHA Championship. UND then faced rival Denver for the Broadmoor Trophy. Denver took to the early lead 1–0 at 5:06 of the first period, UND rallied at 2:32 of the second period and struck again at 8:18 of the second period. Denver tied it up at 17:47 of the third period to force the game into overtime. Frattin scored the game winner at 5:11 of the second overtime to claim North Dakota's second as many seasons and ninth Broadmoor Trophy overall for UND. The team advanced to the 2011 NCAA tournament Midwest Regional in Green Bay, Wisconsin. At the Midwest Regional, UND faced off first against Rensselaer Polytechnic Institute (RPI), where they shut out the Engineers, 6–0, advancing to play WCHA rival Denver for the second straight weekend. UND defeated the Pioneers of Denver 6–1 in the Midwest Regional Final to advance to their fifth Frozen Four in 8 seasons under Dave Hakstol. In the NCAA Frozen Four, UND saw their highly anticipated season come to an end with a 0–2 shutout to the Michigan Wolverines.

In March 2012, UND captured its 10th Broadmoor Trophy with a 4–0 victory over rival Denver. With this victory, UND made history by being the first team in WCHA history to capture the Broadmoor three straight years (2010, 2011, 2012); this is the second time UND has won the tournament from a play in game and also holds a 13-game unbeaten streak in the WCHA tournament and an 8-game WCHA Final Five unbeaten streak. UND lost to rival Minnesota in the NCAA tournament.

Hakstol left the team in May 2015 to take the head coaching job with the Philadelphia Flyers of the National Hockey League, becoming the first college coach to jump to an NHL head coaching position since Herb Brooks was hired by the Minnesota North Stars in 1987.

=== National Collegiate Hockey Conference (NCHC) ===
On July 14, 2011, College Hockey Inc. announced the formation of a new hockey league, the National Collegiate Hockey Conference, which would begin play in the 2013–14 season. The league's six charter members were North Dakota, Colorado College, Denver, Miami (OH), Minnesota–Duluth, and Nebraska-Omaha. All were WCHA members except for CCHA member Miami. Two months after the announcement of the new league, the NCHC added a sixth WCHA member, St. Cloud State, and another CCHA member, Western Michigan. Since starting play, the NCHC has added two members. Arizona State University joined starting the 2024–25 season and the University of St. Thomas has been accepted as a full-time member of the NCHC beginning in the 2026–27 season. The new league was made after the Big Ten Conference decided to sponsor hockey. This change caused widespread backlash due to the break-up of old rivalries that included Minnesota, North Dakota, and Wisconsin.

=== Berry era (2015–2025) ===
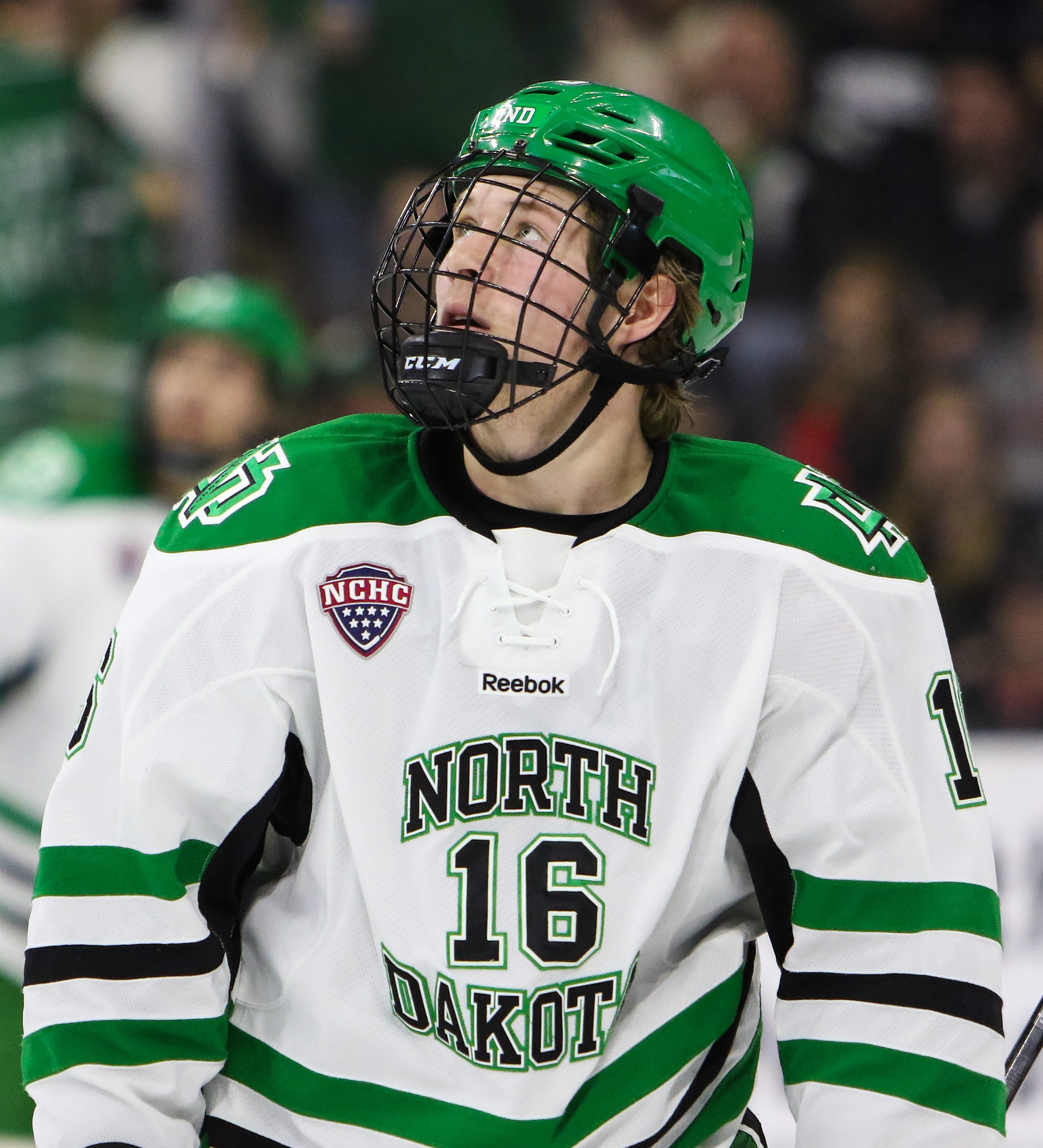
Brock Boeser of the Fighting Hawks in 2016

After Dave Hakstol obtained the head coaching job in Philadelphia, Brad Berry received a promotion to head coach on May 18, 2015. In his first year, he managed a decisive 34–6–4 record, building a line known as the CBS line (Caggiula, Boeser, Schmaltz).

In 2016, North Dakota once again won the NCHC Regular season Championship, but were defeated in the NCHC Tournament. UND finished the regular season as the #3 ranked team in the country and qualified for the NCAA tournament. For the third consecutive season, UND advanced to the 2016 Frozen Four, defeating Northeastern, and Michigan to get there. Following a dramatic 4–2 win over Denver, North Dakota had reached the Championship where they defeated Quinnipiac 5–1. This was their first championship since 2000, and their eighth overall. Only Michigan and Denver have more championships with nine and eleven respectively.

2017 was an up and down year that resulted in the program's 15th consecutive postseason berth. North Dakota lost in double overtime against Boston University in the NCAA tournament, after having a goal disallowed in the first overtime due to an offsides review.

In 2018, inconsistency again plagued the North Dakota hockey team. Plenty of streaks ending, most notably the run of postseason NCAA national tournament appearances. North Dakota's streak of 20 wins in a season came to an end. It resulted in missing the postseason for the first time since the 2001–2002 season.

2019 was another inconsistent year for North Dakota. It resulted in the team finishing fifth in the eighth place NCHC standings. This snapped a streak dating back to the 2002–03 season in which North Dakota hosted and ultimately advanced in their conference tournament. Their season ended with a sweep to the hands of Denver in the first round of the NCHC playoffs.

2020 was a return to national prominence for UND. The team accomplished many feats that few North Dakota teams did before. The team won a series at rivals Denver for the first time in years by virtue of a win and a tie and swept both games against Minnesota at 3M arena at Mariucci for only the second time in the previous 40-year history of games in Minneapolis. The team achieved a #1 ranking in both national polls and was PairWise #1 during the regular season for the first time since 2017. The team went on to win the Penrose Cup as regular season champions in the NCHC.

==== 2020 Postseason cancelation due to COVID-19 ====
In March 2020, before College hockey playoffs began, the NCAA canceled the remainder of all college sports 2020 spring season. The team was due to host Colorado College for a first round series for the start of the postseason, however, the NCHC tournament was canceled due to the outbreak of the coronavirus (COVID-19). Very soon after, the NCAA tournament was canceled leaving the season over for North Dakota. North Dakota set a home record at 18–1, the best in UND hockey history with a win percentage of .947. UND finished the year ranked #1 in the Pairwise with a record of 26–5–4.

==== 2021–2025 ====
In 2021, as a result of the ongoing COVID-19 pandemic, it was determined to play only league games in the NCHC. The first ten games of league play would start in a "pod" in Omaha at Baxter Arena in a three-week period to maximize opportunity to play all games in a controlled situation. North Dakota finished the pod in first in the NCHC and continued to roll into the rest of the regular season and captured their second straight Penrose Cup as regular season champions of the NCHC. The postseason tournament, instead of being played in St. Paul at the Xcel Energy Center due to restrictions from COVID-19, was selected to be played at UND's Ralph Engelstad Arena. North Dakota won the NCHC postseason tournament for the first time in their history making them the first NCHC team to win both the regular season and postseason titles in the same year. UND's promising season ended in heartbreaking fashion in the NCAA regional final round with a loss to rival Minnesota-Duluth in 5 overtimes, making it the longest game in NCAA postseason history.

2022 brought continued success in the regular season for North Dakota. They captured the Penrose Cup for a third consecutive season. They entered the postseason playing host to Colorado College in the first round of the NCHC playoffs and swept the Tigers. A loss at the Frozen Faceoff to Western Michigan ended their NCHC tournament. They would be selected to play in the NCAA tournament but lose in the first round to Notre Dame ending their season.

2023 was a disappointment to the high expectations coming into the season. Inconsistencies in their play in the early part of the year plagued their season despite playing better towards the end of the year. The team would finish tied for fifth in the NCHC standings, and ultimately bowed out in the semifinals of the NCHC tournament. The team would not be selected for participation in the NCAA tournament, which is the third time in eight years under Brad Berry they have not qualified. Berry was fired on March 23, 2025, following his 10th season, in which North Dakota failed to make the NCAA tournament.

=== Jackson era (2025–present) ===
Dane Jackson was announced as the interim head coach in the same press release as the announcement of coach Berry's firing. After a application window of just under seventy two hours, Dane Jackson was named head coach on March 29, 2025. It was announced that Karl Goehring would not return as an assistant under Jackson shortly after. It was later announced that assistant coach Dillon Simpson would be retained as a part of Jackson's staff. During his first press conference Jackson announced a plan to hire a coach to serve in a "general manager" capacity, the first in the college hockey landscape. Bryn Chyzyk was announced as an assistant coach and general manager for the program on April 8, 2025. Chyzyk was a member of UND's 2016 national title winning team and previously worked as a graduate assistant for the team in 2019–2020 and most recently as general manager of the Waterloo Black Hawks. Matt Smaby, most recently head coach of the Waterloo Black Hawks, was announced as the team's associate head coach and final member of Jackson's staff on May 21, 2025 after being previously announced as the sole finalist for the position.

== Season-by-season results ==
Source:

== Championships ==
=== NCAA tournament championships ===
Year	Champion	Record	Score	Runner-up	City	Arena
1959	North Dakota	20–10–1	4–3 (OT)	Michigan State	Troy, New York	RPI Field House
1963	North Dakota	22–7–3	6–5	Denver	Chestnut Hill, Massachusetts	McHugh Forum
1980	North Dakota	31–8–1	5–2	Northern Michigan	Providence, Rhode Island	Providence Civic Center
1982	North Dakota	35–12–0	5–2	Wisconsin	Providence, Rhode Island	Providence Civic Center
1987	North Dakota	40–8–0	5–3	Michigan State	Detroit, Michigan	Joe Louis Arena
1997	North Dakota	31–10–2	6–4	Boston University	Milwaukee, Wisconsin	Bradley Center
2000	North Dakota	31–8–5	4–2	Boston College	Providence, Rhode Island	Providence Civic Center
2016	North Dakota	34–6–4	5–1	Quinnipiac	Tampa, Florida	Amalie Arena

=== WCHA Final Five playoff record ===
- Final Five playoffs (1988–2013) Record 64–34–0

=== WCHA Tournament championships/Broadmoor Trophy ===
Year	Record	Coach
1967	19–10–0	Bill Selman
1968	20–10–3	Bill Selman
1979	30–11–1	John "Gino" Gasparini
1980	31–8–1	John "Gino" Gasparini
1987	40–8–0	John "Gino" Gasparini
1997	31–10–2	Dean Blais
2000	31–8–5	Dean Blais
2006	29–16–1	Dave Hakstol
2010	25–12–5	Dave Hakstol
2011	32–9–3	Dave Hakstol
2012	25–12–3	Dave Hakstol

=== WCHA Regular season Championships/MacNaughton Cup ===
Year	Record	Conference record	Coach
1958	20–10–1	15–5–0	Barry Thorndycraft
1963	22–7–3	11–5–2	Barry Thorndycraft
1965	25–8–0	13–3–0	Bob Peters
1967	19–10–0	16–6–0	Bill Selman
1979	30–11–1	22–10–0	John Gasparini
1980	31–8–1	21–6–1	John Gasparini
1982	35–12–0	19–7–0	John Gasparini
1987	40–8–0	29–6–0	John Gasparini
1997	31–10–2	21–10–1	Dean Blais
1998	30–8–1	21–6–1	Dean Blais
1999	32–6–2	24–2–2	Dean Blais
2001	29–8–9	18–4–6	Dean Blais
2004	30–8–3	20–5–3	Dean Blais
2009	24–15–4	17–7–4	Dave Hakstol
2011	32–9–3	21–6–1	Dave Hakstol

=== NCHC Regular season Championships/Penrose Cup ===
Year	Record	Conference record	Coach
2015	29–10–3	16–6–2	Dave Hakstol
2016	34–6–4	19–4–1	Brad Berry
2020	26–5–4	17–4–3	Brad Berry
2021	22–6–1	18–4–1	Brad Berry
2022	24–14–1	17–6–1	Brad Berry
2024	26–12–2	15–8–1	Brad Berry
2026	29–10–1	17–6–1	Dane Jackson

=== NCHC Tournament championships ===
Year	Record	Coach
2021	22–6–1	Brad Berry

== Historic record ==
As of April 10, 2026

=== Record vs. National Collegiate Hockey Conference (NCHC) opponents ===
Team	UND Record	Win Pct.	First Meeting	Last Meeting
Arizona State	4–3–0	.571	2–3 L	5–3 W
Colorado College	175–90–12	.653	8–4 W	5–2 W
Denver	162–139–16	.536	18–3 W	2–3 L
Miami	34–8–4	.783	5–2 W	4–3 W (OT)
Minnesota Duluth	163–94–10	.629	11–0 W	1–5 L
Omaha	44–23–2	.652	6–5 W	5–1 W
St. Cloud State	86–50–20	.615	1–8 L	6–4 W
St. Thomas	2–0–0	1.000	6–2 W	5–2 W
Western Michigan	32–17–1	.650	6–3 W	3–4 L (OT)

=== Records vs. former conference opponents ===
Team	UND Record	Win Pct.	First Meeting	Last Meeting
Alaska Anchorage	49–17–6	.722	3–2 W	4–3 W
Bemidji State	39–6–8	.811	7–4 W	2–1 W (OT)
Michigan	42–48–4	.468	6–5 W	3–4 L
Michigan State	64–37–3	.630	14–1 W	2–2 T (OT)
Michigan Tech	150–94–10	.610	1–6 L	3–1 W
Minnesota	138–146–16	.487	6–3 W	1–5 L
Minnesota State	41–14–9	.711	0–3 L	0–3 L
Northern Michigan	29–23–3	.555	8–4 W	3–2 W
Notre Dame	17–18–3	.487	5–6 L (OT)	1–2 L (OT)
Wisconsin	73–88–13	.457	5–7 L	1–2 L

=== Record vs. active non-conference opponents ===
Team	UND Record	Win Pct.	First Meeting	Last Meeting
Air Force	5–0–0	1.000	7–1 W	3–2 W (OT)
Alaska	7–3–0	.700	6–1 W	6–2 W
Army	2–0–0	1.000	7–3 W	7–2 W
Bentley	0–0–0	–	—	—
Boston College	12–11–1	.521	5–3 W	4–3 W
Boston University	15–14–2	.516	3–2 W (OT)	3–4 L
Bowling Green	6–3–0	.667	9–3 W	3–2 W (OT)
Brown	2–0–0	1.000	9–5 W	5–2 W
Canisius	9–2–0	.818	6–0 W	8–1 W
Clarkson	8–1–0	.889	5–1 W	1–0 W
Colgate	0–1–0	.000	2–3 L	2–3 L
Connecticut	0–0–0	–	—	—
Cornell	5–7–0	.417	0–1 L	3–5 L
Dartmouth	5–0–0	1.000	4–2 W	4–1 W
Ferris State	6–1–0	.857	5–1 W	2–1 W (OT)
Harvard	9–3–1	.731	2–5 L	7–3 W
Holy Cross	6–0–0	1.000	3–0 W	4–1 W
Lake Superior State	5–0–0	1.000	7–3 W	5–2 W
Lindenwood	2–0–0	1.000	4–3 W	4–2 W
Long Island	0–0–0	–	—	—
Maine	12–8–3	.587	5–1 W	1–1 T (OT)
Massachusetts	0–1–0	.000	2–3 L	2–3 L
Massachusetts Lowell	5–4–0	.556	2–1 W	8–4 W
Merrimack	3–0–0	1.000	5–2 W	3–0 W
New Hampshire	10–4–2	.688	9–3 W	5–6 L
Niagara	9–0–0	1.000	4–1 W	4–0 W
Northeastern	10–5–3	.639	6–2 W	6–2 W
Ohio State	3–0–0	1.000	7–2 W	4–1 W
Penn State	0–1–0	.000	4–6 L	4–6 L
Princeton	3–0–0	1.000	4–1 W	5–1 W
Providence	10–5–1	.656	6–0 W	5–2 W
Quinnipiac	6–2–1	.722	6–1 W	5–0 W
Rensselaer	9–1–0	.900	8–3 W	5–2 L
Robert Morris	4–0–0	1.000	8–0 W	1–0 W
RIT	0–0–0	–	—	—
St. Lawrence	14–2–0	.875	4–3 W (OT)	6–1 W
Stonehill	0–0–0	–	—	—
Union	1–1–1	.500	3–1 W	2–2 T (OT)
Vermont	5–0–1	.917	7–5 W	5–2 W
Yale	5–2–0	.714	15–0 W	1–4 L

== Head coaches ==
=== All-time coaching records ===
As of March 21, 2025

Tenure	Coach	Years	Record	Pct.	Championships
1929–1932	Joe Brown	3	1–2–0	.333	None
1932–1933	Noland Franz	1	1–8–0	.111	None
1935–1936	Buck Cameron	1	2–2–0	.500	None
1946–1947	John C. "Jamie" Jamieson	1	7–6–0	.538	None
1947–1949	Don Norman	2	20–17–1	.539	None
1949–1956	Fido Purpur	7	94–75–8	.554	None
1956–1957	Al Renfrew	1	18–11–0	.621	None
1957–1959	Bob May	2	44–17–2	.714	1 MacNaughton Cup, 2 Title Games, 1 NCAA Title
1959–1964	Barry Thorndycraft	5	71–65–8	.521	2 MacNaughton Cups, 1 Title Game, 1 NCAA Title
1964–1966	Bob Peters	2	42–20–1	.675	1 MacNaughton Cup
1966–1968	Bill Selman	2	39–20–3	.653	1 MacNaughton Cup, 2 Broadmoor Trophies, 1 Title Game
1968–1978	Rube Bjorkman	10	149–186–11	.447	None
1978–1994	John Gasparini	16	392–248–25	.608	4 MacNaughton Cups, 2 Broadmoor Trophies, 4 Title Games, 3 NCAA Titles
1994–2004	Dean Blais	10	262–115–33	.679	5 MacNaughton Cups, 4 Broadmoor Trophies, 3 Title Games, 2 NCAA Titles
2004–2015	Dave Hakstol	11	289–143–43	.654	2 MacNaughton Cups, 1 Penrose Cup, 4 Broadmoor Trophies, 1 Title Game
2015–2025	Brad Berry	10	227–119–35	.642	5 Penrose Cups, 1 NCHC Tournament championship, 1 Title Game, 1 NCAA Title
2025–present	Dane Jackson	1	29–10–1	.738	1 Penrose Cup
Totals	17 coaches	85 seasons	1,687–1,064–171	.607	22 Regular season titles, 12 Tournament titles, 13 Title games, 8 NCAA titles

== Statistical leaders ==
=== Career points leaders ===
Player	Years	GP	G	A	Pts
Greg Johnson	1989–1993	155	74	198	272
Mark Taylor	1976–1980	157	97	168	265
Jeff Panzer	1997–2001	164	80	148	228
Dixon Ward	1988–1992	163	110	109	219
Lee Davidson	1986–1990	167	80	122	202
Doug Smail	1977–1980	113	89	106	195
Steve Johnson	1984–1988	153	70	121	191
Ben Cherski	1951–1955	100	131	57	188
Phil Sykes	1978–1982	161	98	90	188
Rick Zaparniuk	1976–1980	157	60	125	185

=== Career goaltending leaders ===
GP = Games played; Min = Minutes played; W = Wins; L = Losses; T = Ties; GA = Goals against; SO = Shutouts; GAA = Goals against average: SV% = Save percentage

Minimum 40 games played

Player	Years	GP	Min	W	L	T	GA	SO	GAA	SV%
Zane McIntyre	2012–2015	92	5,424	58	24	9	190	4	2.10	.926
Jordan Parise	2003–2006	83	4,822	55	20	7	172	10	2.14	.921
Jean-Philippe Lamoureux	2004–2008	111	6,469	60	38	10	231	10	2.14	.920
Karl Goehring	1997–2001	118	6,686	80	20	13	249	15	2.23	.918
Adam Scheel	2018–2021	78	4,578	52	18	5	149	7	1.95	.916

Statistics current through the 2025-26 season.

== Roster ==
As of September 16, 2026.

No.	Nat.	Player	Class	Pos	Height	Weight	DoB	Hometown	Previous team	NHL rights
2	(United States)	Garrett Lindberg	Freshman	D	5' 11" (1.8 m)	201 lb (91 kg)	2007-03-08	Moorhead, Minnesota	Fargo (USHL)	—
3	(Canada)	Connor Davis	Freshman	F	6' 2" (1.88 m)	197 lb (89 kg)	2006-11-09	Vaudreuil-Dorion, Quebec	Cedar Rapids (USHL)	VAN, 129th overall 2026
4	(Canada)	Carson Carels	Freshman	D	6' 2" (1.88 m)	192 lb (87 kg)	2008-06-23	Cypress River, Manitoba	Prince George (WHL)	CGY, 6th overall 2026
5	(United States)	Brasen Boser	Junior	D	5' 11" (1.8 m)	190 lb (86 kg)	2004-02-29	Minot, North Dakota	Arizona State (NCHC)	—
6	(United States)	EJ Emery	Junior	D	6' 3" (1.91 m)	193 lb (88 kg)	2006-03-30	Compton, California	USNTDP (USHL)	NYR, 30th overall 2024
7	(United States)	Mac Swanson (A)	Junior	F	5' 9" (1.75 m)	170 lb (77 kg)	2006-01-10	Anchorage, Alaska	Fargo (USHL)	PIT, 207th overall 2024
8	(Canada)	Ollie Josephson	Sophomore	F	6' 1" (1.85 m)	191 lb (87 kg)	2006-07-22	Victoria, British Columbia	Red Deer (WHL)	SEA, 105nd overall 2024
9	(United States)	Will Zellers	Sophomore	F	6' 0" (1.83 m)	185 lb (84 kg)	2006-04-04	Maple Grove, Minnesota	Green Bay (USHL)	BOS, 76th overall 2024
10	(Norway)	Kasper Magnussen	Senior	F	6' 0" (1.83 m)	208 lb (94 kg)	2004-02-19	Fredrikstad, Norway	Bemidji State (CCHA)	—
11	(United States)	Ashton Schultz	Freshman	F	6' 0" (1.83 m)	195 lb (88 kg)	2006-10-03	Minnetonka, Minnesota	Sioux City (USHL)	BUF, 167th overall 2025
13	(United States)	Sam Laurila	Sophomore	D	6' 1" (1.85 m)	195 lb (88 kg)	2006-09-02	Moorhead, Minnesota	Fargo (USHL)	NYI, 138th overall 2025
14	(Canada)	Bauer Dumanski	Freshman	D	6' 2" (1.88 m)	209 lb (95 kg)	2005-01-05	Lockwood, Saskatchewan	Prince George (WHL)	—
15	(United States)	Jack Kernan	Sophomore	F	6' 2" (1.88 m)	205 lb (93 kg)	2005-03-30	Maple Grove, Minnesota	Des Moines (USHL)	—
17	(Canada)	Cole Reschny (C)	Sophomore	F	5' 11" (1.8 m)	190 lb (86 kg)	2007-04-06	Macklin, Saskatchewan	Victoria (WHL)	CGY, 18th overall 2025
18	(Canada)	Keaton Verhoeff	Sophomore	D	6' 4" (1.93 m)	214 lb (97 kg)	2008-06-19	Fort Saskatchewan, Alberta	Victoria (WHL)	SJS, 9th overall 2026
19	(United States)	Cody Croal (A)	Junior	F	5' 11" (1.8 m)	200 lb (91 kg)	2003-06-17	North Branch, Minnesota	Muskegon (USHL)	—
20	(United States)	Gavin Lindberg	Junior	F	6' 1" (1.85 m)	200 lb (91 kg)	2004-04-20	Moorhead, Minnesota	Colorado College (NCHC)	—
21	(United States)	Cooper Simpson	Freshman	F	6' 1" (1.85 m)	192 lb (87 kg)	2007-02-05	Shakopee, Minnesota	Youngstown (USHL)	BOS, 79th overall 2025
24	(Canada)	Josh Zakreski	Sophomore	F	6' 0" (1.83 m)	198 lb (90 kg)	2005-12-17	Saskatoon, Saskatchewan	Portland (WHL)	—
25	(Canada)	Ethan MacKenzie	Freshman	D	6' 1" (1.85 m)	195 lb (88 kg)	2006-09-02	Peachland, British Columbia	Edmonton (WHL)	TOR, 69th overall 2026
27	(United States)	Anthony Menghini (A)	Senior	F	5' 10" (1.78 m)	195 lb (88 kg)	2002-12-03	Brainerd, Minnesota	Minnesota Duluth (NCHC)	—
28	(United States)	Brock Schultz	Freshman	F	5' 8" (1.73 m)	176 lb (80 kg)	2005-07-10	East Grand Forks, Minnesota	Sioux Falls (USHL)	—
29	(Canada)	Hudson Malinoski	Senior	F	6' 2" (1.88 m)	195 lb (88 kg)	2004-05-19	Saskatoon, Saskatchewan	Providence (HEA)	TOR, 153rd overall 2023
30	(United States)	Caleb Heil	Freshman	G	6' 2" (1.88 m)	207 lb (94 kg)	2006-06-19	Victoria, Minnesota	Madison (USHL)	TBL, 193rd overall 2025
32	(Canada)	Alex Scheiwiller	Freshman	G	6' 1" (1.85 m)	187 lb (85 kg)	2005-01-10	Calgary, Alberta	Canmore (AJHL)	—
35	(Czech Republic)	Jan Špunar	Sophomore	G	6' 3" (1.91 m)	202 lb (92 kg)	2004-05-30	Olomouc, Czech Republic	Dubuque (USHL)	—

1.Zellers was selected by the Colorado Avalanche in 2024, but his NHL rights were traded to the Boston Bruins on March 7, 2025.

== Olympians ==
This is a list of North Dakota alumni who have played on an Olympic team.

Name	Position	North Dakota Tenure	Team	Year	Finish
John Noah	Defenseman	1947–1951	(United States) USA	1952	Silver
Gordon Christian	Forward	1947–1950	(United States) USA	1956	Silver
Daniel McKinnon	Forward	1947–1950	(United States) USA	1956	Silver
Ken Purpur	Forward	1951–1954	(United States) USA	1956	Silver
Tom Yurkovich	Goaltender	1954–1957	(United States) USA	1964	5th
Bill Reichart	Right wing	1953–1957	(United States) USA	1964	5th
Don Ross	Defenseman	1961–1963, 1964–1965	(United States) USA	1964, 1968	5th, 6th
Mike Curran	Goaltender	1965–1968	(United States) USA	1972	Silver
Dave Christian	Right wing	1977–1979	(United States) USA	1980	Gold
Roger Lamoureux	Forward	1973–1977	(Canada) CAN	1980	6th
Kevin Maxwell	Center	1978–1979	(Canada) CAN	1980	6th
Bob DePiero	Defenseman	1973–1977	(Italy) ITA	1984	9th
Dave Donnelly	Center	1981–1983	(Canada) CAN	1984	4th
James Patrick	Defenseman	1981–1983	(Canada) CAN	1984	4th
Dave Tippett	Left wing	1981–1983	(Canada) CAN	1984, 1992	4th, Silver
Bob Joyce	Left wing	1984–1987	(Canada) CAN	1988	4th
Gord Sherven	Center	1981–1984	(Canada) CAN	1988	4th
Greg Johnson	Center	1989–1993	(Canada) CAN	1994	Silver
Ed Belfour	Goaltender	1986–1987	(Canada) CAN	2002	Gold
Jason Blake	Left wing	1996–1999	(United States) USA	2006	8th
Zach Parise	Left wing	2002–2004	(United States) USA	2010, 2014	Silver, 4th
Jonathan Toews	Center	2005–2007	(Canada) CAN	2010, 2014	Gold, Gold
T. J. Oshie	Right wing	2005–2008	(United States) USA	2014	4th
Chay Genoway	Defenseman	2006–2011	(Canada) CAN	2018	Bronze
Ludvig Hoff	Left wing	2016–2019	(Norway) NOR	2018	8th
Corban Knight	Center	2009–2013	(Canada) CAN	2022	6th
Matej Tomek	Goaltender	2016–2017	(Slovakia) SVK	2022	Bronze
Jake Sanderson	Defensemen	2020–2022	(United States) USA	2022, 2026	5th, Gold
Brock Nelson	Center	2010–2012	(United States) USA	2026	Gold

* indicates the competition is ongoing, and winners have yet to be determined and announced.

== UND Hall of Fame ==
The following is a list of people associated with the men's ice hockey program who were elected into the UND Hall of Fame (induction date in parentheses).

- Bill Reichart (1975)
- John Noah (1976)
- Bill Steenson (1976)
- Ken Johannson (1977)
- Cal Marvin (1977)
- Reg Morelli (1977)
- Fido Purpur (1977)
- Ben Cherski (1978)
- Gordon Christian (1980)
- Milt Johnson (1981)
- Buzz Johnson (1981)
- Bob May (1981)
- Jim Medved (1981)
- Daniel McKinnon (1982)
- Bartley Larson (1983)
- John Marks (1985)
- Bob Munro (1985)
- Ralph Engelstad (1987)
- Dennis Hextall (1987)
- Mike Curran (1988)
- Ken Purpur (1989)
- Bill Selman (1993)
- Mark Taylor (1993)
- Doug Smail (1995)
- Terry Abram (1996)
- Guy LaFrance (1997)
- Al McLean (1997)
- Phil Sykes (1997)
- Rick Wilson (1997)
- Marc Chorney (1998)
- Paul Chadwick (2001)
- Jim Archibald (2002)
- 1947–48 men's Team (2002)
- 1958–59 men's team (2002)
- Jim Archibald (2002)
- Troy Murray (2003)
- 1962–63 men's team (2003)
- Dave Christian (2004)
- Darren Jensen (2004)
- 1979–80 men's team (2004)
- Bob Joyce (2005)
- 1986–87 men's team (2005)
- Alan Hangsleben (2006)
- Tony Hrkac (2006)
- 1981–82 men's team (2006)
- Craig Ludwig (2008)
- Dixon Ward (2009)
- 1996–97 men's team (2012)
- Greg Johnson (2013)
- Jason Blake (2016)
- Steve Johnson (2017)
- Dean Blais (2018)
- 1999–2000 men's team (2018)
- Lee Davidson (2019)

== Fighting Hawks in the NHL ==
As of June 19, 2026.

= NHL All-Star team	= NHL All-Star	= NHL All-Star and NHL All-Star team	= Hall of Famers

Player	Position	Team(s)	Years	Games	Stanley Cups
Earl Anderson	Right wing	DET, BOS	1974–1977	109	0
Jim Archibald	Right wing	MNS	1984–1987	16	0
Murray Baron	Defenseman	PHI, STL, MTL, PHO, VAN	1989–2004	988	0
Mike Baumgartner	Defenseman	KCS	1974–1975	17	0
Ryan Bayda	Left wing	CAR	2002–2009	179	0
Ed Belfour	Goaltender	CHI, SJS, DAL, TOR, FLA	1988–2007	963	1
Perry Berezan	Center	CGY, MNS, SJS	1984–1993	378	0
Jacob Bernard-Docker	Defenseman	OTT, BUF, DET	2020–present	207	0
Brad Berry	Defenseman	WPG, MNS, DAL	1985–1994	241	0
Jackson Blake	Right wing	CAR	2023–present	162	1
Jason Blake	Right wing	LAK, NYI, TOR, ANA	1998–2012	871	0
Brandon Bochenski	Right wing	OTT, CHI, BOS, ANA, NSH, TBL	2005–2010	156	0
Brock Boeser	Right wing	VAN	2016–present	629	0
Brad Bombardir	Defenseman	NJD, MIN, NSH	1997–2004	356	1
Dan Brennan	Forward	LAK	1983–1986	8	0
Drake Caggiula	Center	EDM, CHI, ARI, BUF, PIT	2016–2025	289	0
Jon Casey	Goaltender	MNS, BOS, STL	1983–1997	425	0
Jay Caufield	Right wing	NYR, MNS, PIT	1986–1993	208	2
Marc Chorney	Defenseman	PIT, LAK	1980–1984	210	0
Taylor Chorney	Defenseman	EDM, STL, PIT, WSH, CBJ	2008–2018	166	0
Dave Christian	Right wing	WPG, WSH, BOS, STL, CHI	1979–1994	1,009	0
Mike Commodore	Defenseman	NJD, CGY, CAR, OTT, CBJ, DET, TBL	2000–2012	484	1
Brad DeFauw	Left wing	CAR	2002–2003	9	0
Aaron Dell	Goaltender	SJS, NJD, BUF	2016–2023	130	0
Dave Donnelly	Defenseman	BOS, CHI, EDM	1983–1988	137	0
Justin Duberman	Center	PIT	1993–1994	4	0
Neil Eisenhut	Center	VAN, CGY	1993–1995	16	0
Joe Finley	Defenseman	BUF, NYI	2011–2013	21	0
Derek Forbort	Defenseman	LAK, CGY, WIN, BOS, VAN	2015–present	552	0
Matt Frattin	Right wing	TOR, LAK, CBJ	2010–2015	135	0
Rhett Gardner	Center	DAL, PHI	2019–2024	41	0
Chay Genoway	Defenseman	MIN	2011–2012	1	0
Shane Gersich	Left wing	WSH	2017–2018	3	0
Lee Goren	Right wing	BOS, FLA, VAN	2000–2007	67	0
Matt Greene	Center	EDM, LAK	2005–2017	615	2
Rocco Grimaldi	Center	FLA, COL, NSH	2014–2022	203	0
David Hale	Defenseman	NJD, CGY, PHO, TBL, OTT	2003–2011	327	0
Alan Hangsleben	Defenseman	HFD, WSH, LAK	1979–1982	185	0
Matt Henderson	Left wing	NSH, CHI	1998–2002	4	0
Jason Herter	Defenseman	NYI	1995–1996	1	0
Dennis Hextall	Left wing	NYR, LAK, CAL, MNS, DET, WSH	1967–1980	681	0
Tony Hrkac	Center	STL, QUE, SJS, CHI, DAL, EDM, NYI, ANA, ATL	1986–2003	758	1
Dave Hudson	Center	NYI, KCS, COR	1972–1978	409	0
Dane Jackson	Right wing	VAN, BUF, NYI	1985–1992	45	0
Chris Jensen	Center	NYR, PHI	1985–1992	74	0
Darren Jensen	Goaltender	PHI	1984–1986	30	0
Greg Johnson	Center	DET, PIT, CHI, NSH	1993–2006	785	0
Luke Johnson	Center	CHI, MIN	2018–2021	32	0
Ryan Johnson	Defenseman	FLA, TBL, STL, VAN, CHI	1997–2011	701	0
Matt Jones	Defenseman	PHO	2005–2008	106	0
Tyson Jost	Center	COL, MIN, BUF, CAR, NSH	2016–present	564	0
Bob Joyce	Left wing	BOS, WSH, WPG	1987–1993	158	0
Ian Kidd	Defenseman	VAN	1987–1989	20	0
Matt Kiersted	Defenseman	FLA, MIN	2020–present	45	0
Tyler Kleven	Defenseman	OTT	2022–present	158	0
Corban Knight	Center	CGY, FLA, PHI	2013–2019	52	0

Player	Position	Team(s)	Years	Games	Stanley Cups
Paul LaDue	Defenseman	LAK, NYI	2016–2022	70	0
Brian Lee	Defenseman	OTT, TBL	2007–2013	209	0
Jake Livanavage	Defenseman	PIT	2026–present	1	0
Craig Ludwig	Defenseman	MTL, NYI, MNS, DAL	1982–1999	1,256	2
Andrew MacWilliam	Defenseman	TOR	2014–2015	12	0
Brad Malone	Center	COL, CAR, EDM	2011–2023	217	0
John Marks	Defenseman	CHI	1972–1982	657	0
Kevin Maxwell	Forward	MNS, COR, NJD	1980–1984	66	0
Zane McIntyre	Goaltender	BOS	2016–2017	8	0
Jeff McLean	Center	SJS	1993–1994	6	0
Curtis Murphy	Defenseman	MIN	2002–2003	1	0
Brady Murray	Forward	LAK	2007–2008	4	0
Troy Murray	Defenseman	CHI, WPG, OTT, PIT, COL	1981–1996	914	1
Brock Nelson	Center	NYI, COL	2012–present	1,001	0
T. J. Oshie	Right wing	STL, WSH	2008–2024	1,010	1
Zach Parise	Left wing	NJD, MIN, NYI, COL	2005–2024	1,254	0
James Patrick	Defenseman	NYR, HFD, CGY, BUF	1983–2004	1,280	0
Shane Pinto	Center	OTT	2020–present	210	0
Austin Poganski	Right wing	STL, WIN	2019–2022	22	0
Tucker Poolman	Defenseman	WIN, VAN	2017–2023	163	0
Chris Porter	Left wing	STL, MIN	2008–2016	234	0
Travis Roche	Defenseman	MIN, PHO	2000–2007	60	0
Russ Romaniuk	Defenseman	WPG, PHI	1991–1996	102	0
Carter Rowney	Center	PIT, ANA, DET	2016–2022	249	1
Scott Sandelin	Defenseman	MTL, PHI, MNS	1986–1992	25	0
Jake Sanderson	Defenseman	OTT	2022–present	303	0
Jordan Schmaltz	Defenseman	STL	2016–2019	42	0
Nick Schmaltz	Center	CHI, ARI, UTA	2016–present	670	0
Paxton Schulte	Left wing	QUE, CGY	1993–1997	2	0
Gord Sherven	Forward	EDM, MNS, HFD	1983–1988	97	0
Dillon Simpson	Defenseman	EDM	2016–2017	3	0
Matt Smaby	Defenseman	TBL	2007–2011	122	0
Doug Smail	Forward	WPG, MNS, QUE, OTT	1980–1993	845	0
Cole Smith	Left wing	NSH, VGK	2020–present	292	0
Geoff Smith	Defenseman	EDM, FLA, NYR	1989–1999	462	0
Drew Stafford	Right wing	BUF, WIN, BOS, NJD	2006–2019	841	0
Troy Stecher	Defenseman	VAN, DET, LAK, ARI, CGY, EDM, TOR	2016–present	624	0
Phil Sykes	Forward	LAK, WPG	1982–1992	456	0
Mark Taylor	Center	PHI, PIT, WSH	1981–1986	209	0
Dave Tippett	Defenseman	HFD, WSH, PIT, PHI	1983–1994	721	0
Jonathan Toews	Center	CHI, WIN	2007–2026	1,150	3
Jeff Ulmer	Right wing	NYR	2000–2001	21	0
Garry Valk	Left wing	VAN, ANA, PIT, TOR, CHI	1990–2003	777	0
Chris VandeVelde	Center	EDM, PHI	2010–2017	278	0
Mickey Volcan	Defenseman	HFD, CGY	1980–1984	162	0
Howard Walker	Defenseman	WSH, CGY	1980–1983	83	0
Dixon Ward	Right wing	VAN, TOR, BUF, BOS, NYR	1992–2003	537	0
Matt Watkins	Right wing	PHO	2011–2012	1	0
Jasper Weatherby	Center	SJS	2021–2022	50	0
Landon Wilson	Right wing	COL, BOS, PHO, PIT, DAL	1995–2009	375	0
Rick Wilson	Defenseman	MTL, STL, DET	1973–1977	239	0
Abram Wiebe	Defenseman	CGY	2026–present	4	0
Murray Wing	Defenseman	DET	1973–1974	1	0
Christian Wolanin	Defenseman	OTT, LAK, BUF, VAN	2017–2023	86	0
Travis Zajac	Center	NJD, NYI	2006–2021	1,037	0
Rick Zombo	Defenseman	DET, STL, BOS	1984–1996	652	0

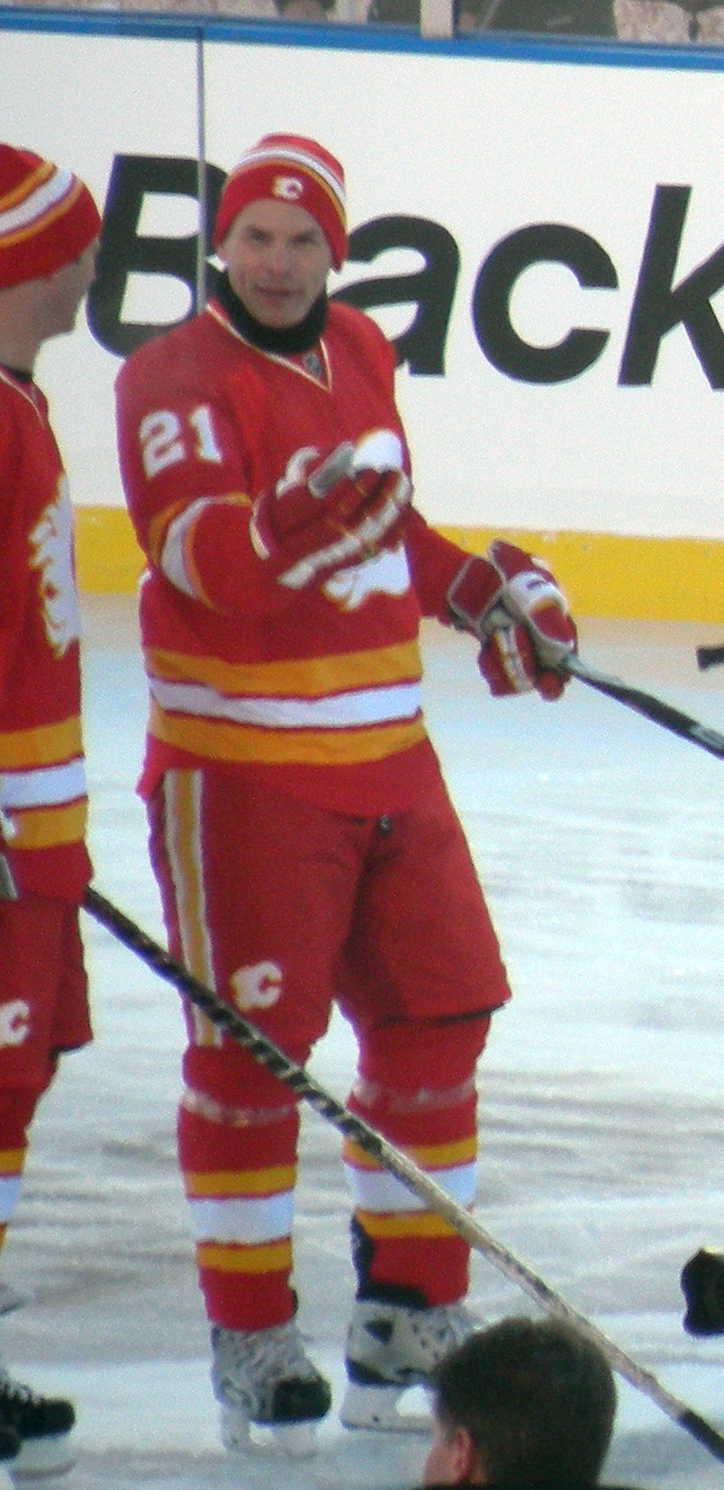
Perry Berezan

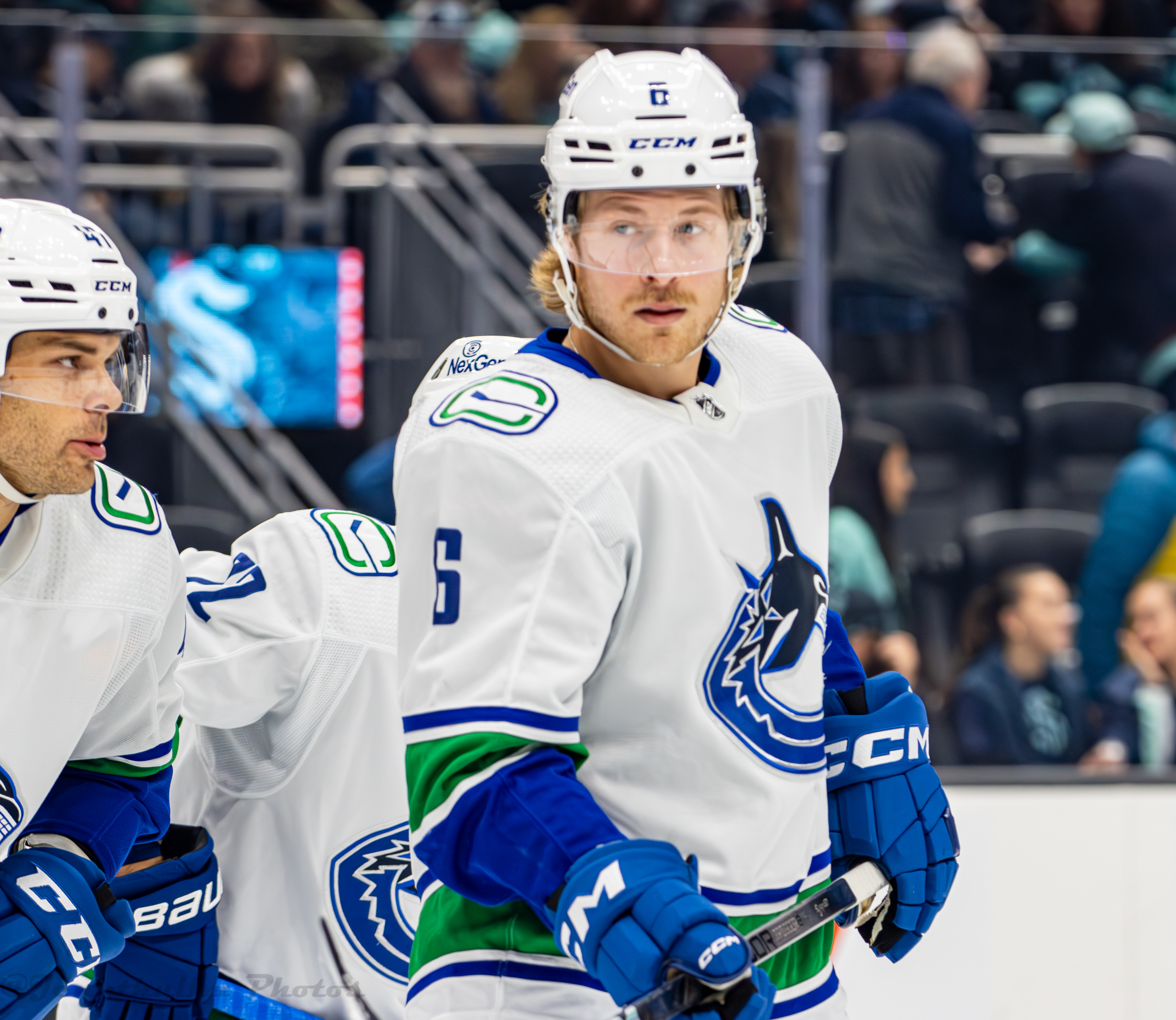
Brock Boeser

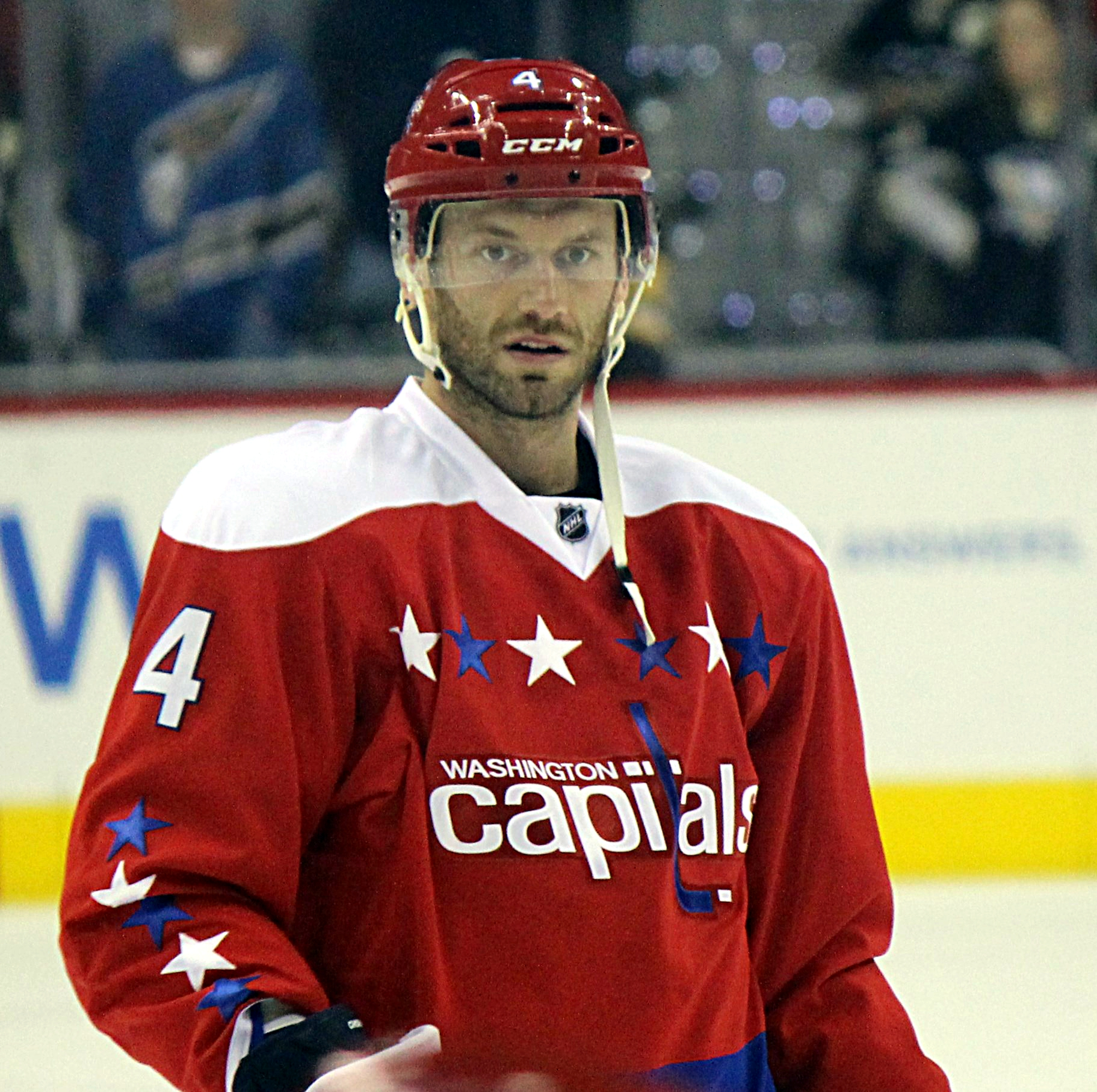
Taylor Chorney

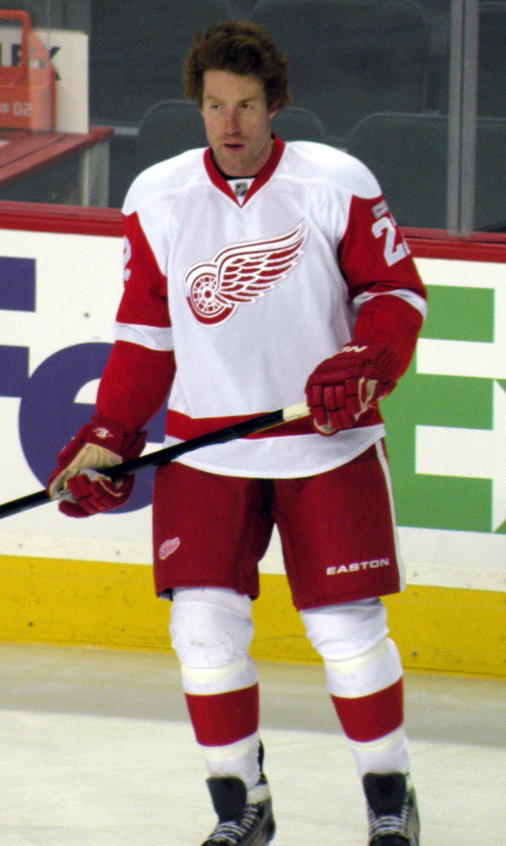
Mike Commodore

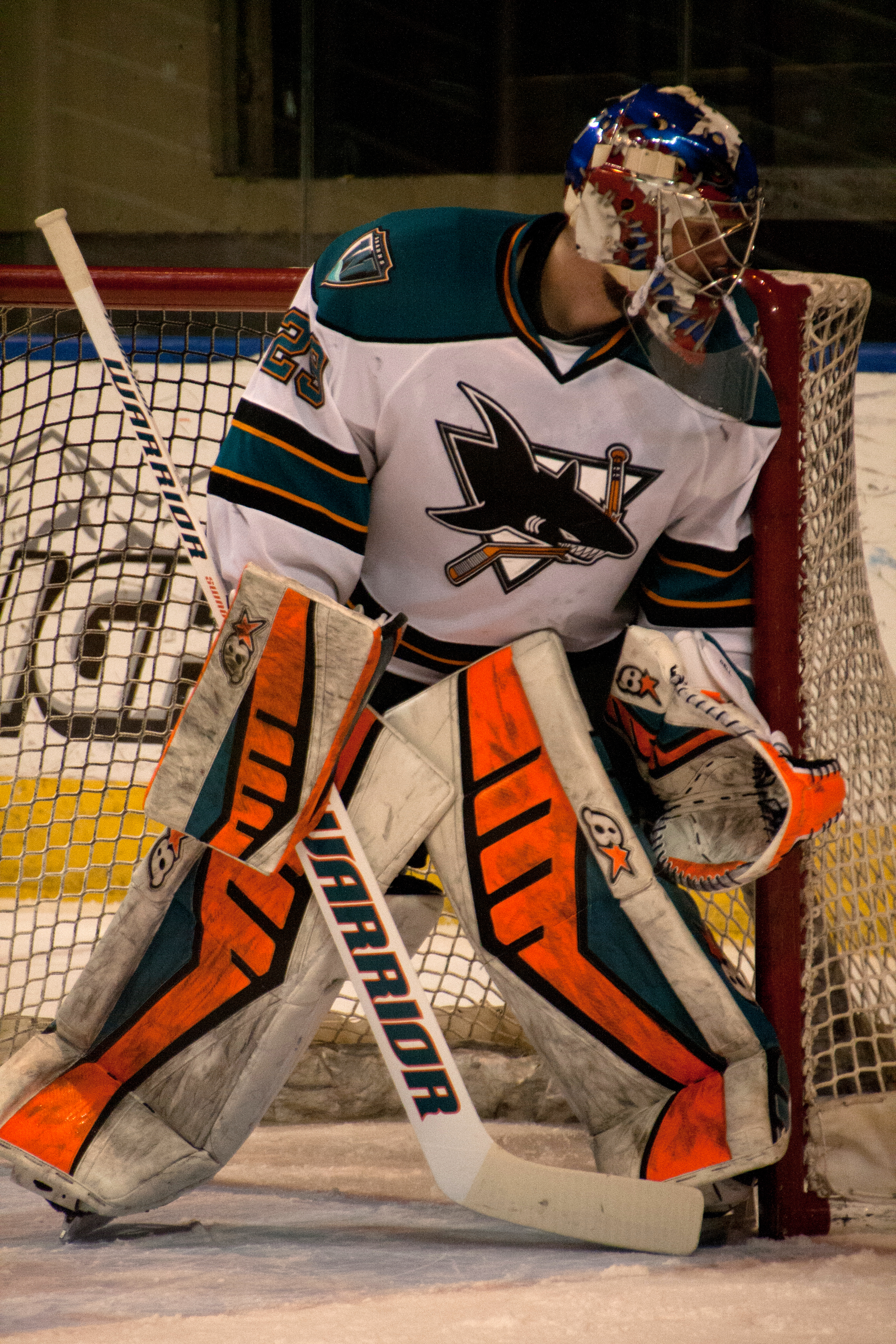
Aaron Dell

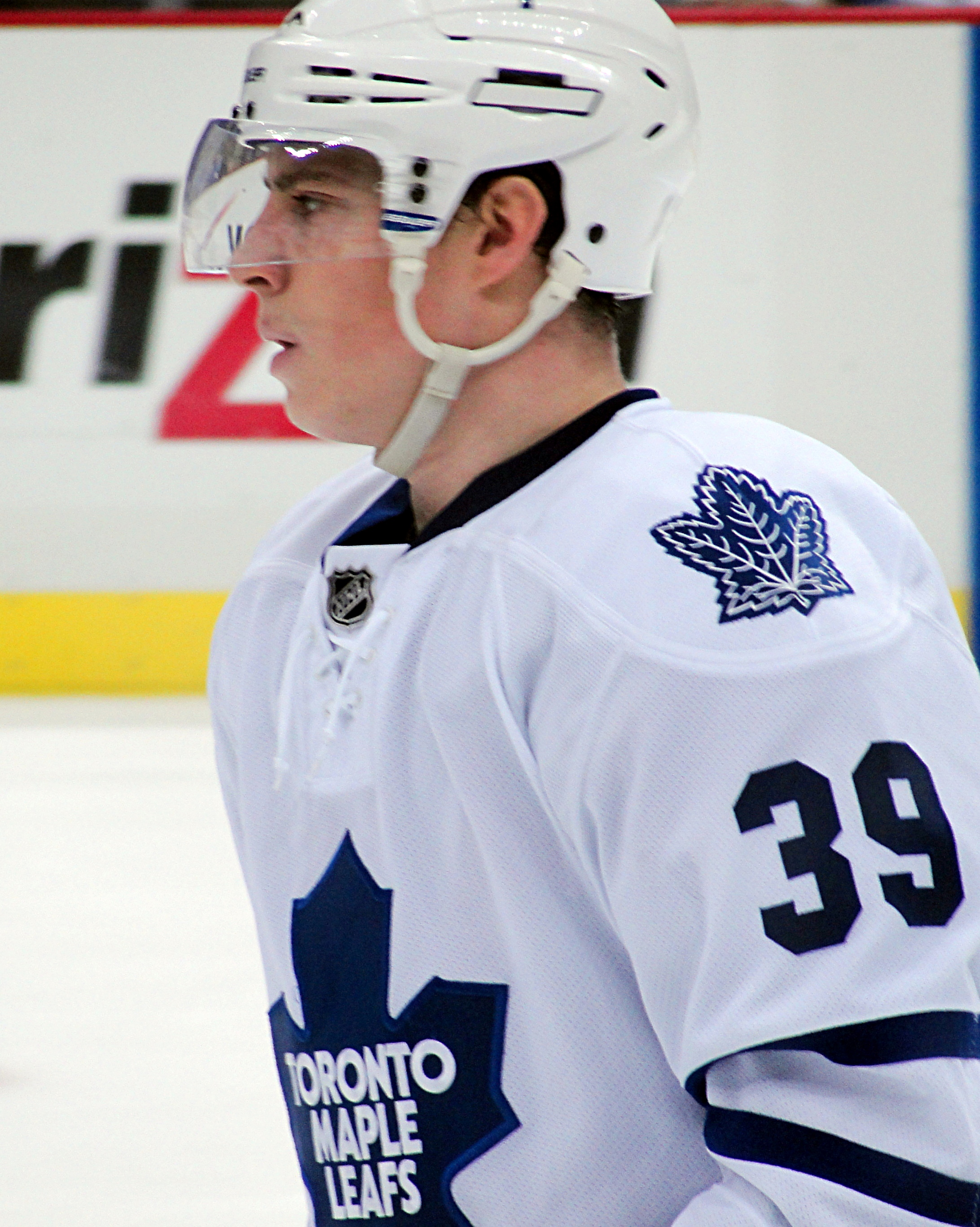
Matt Frattin

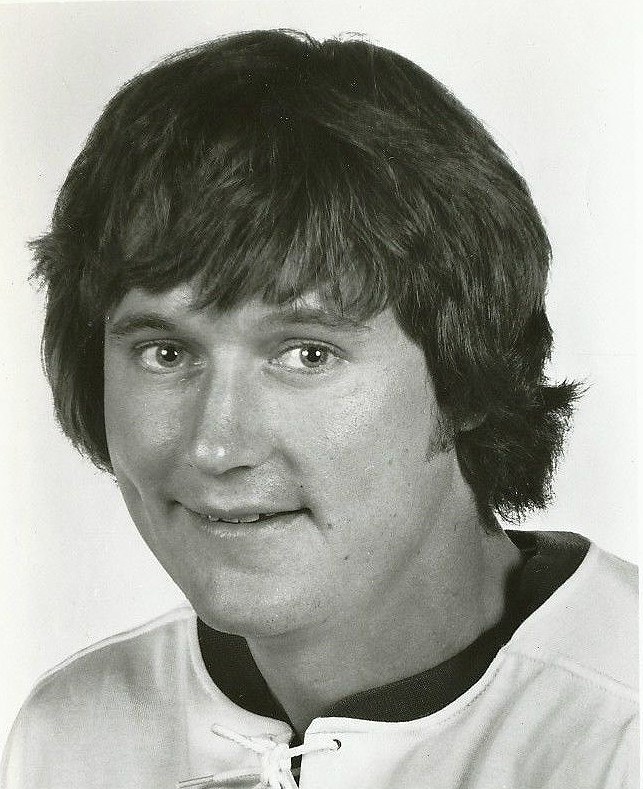
Dave Hudson

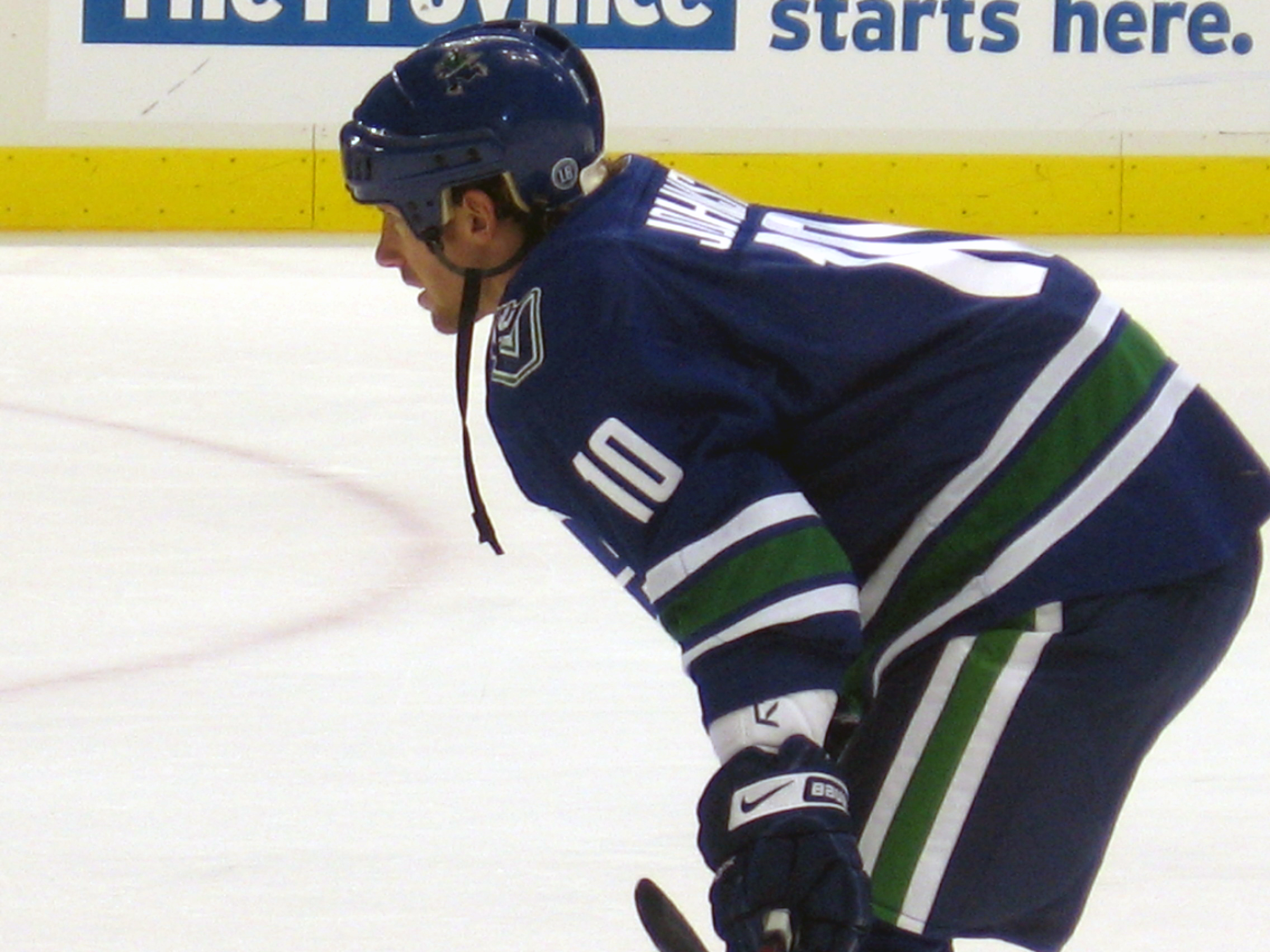
Ryan Johnson

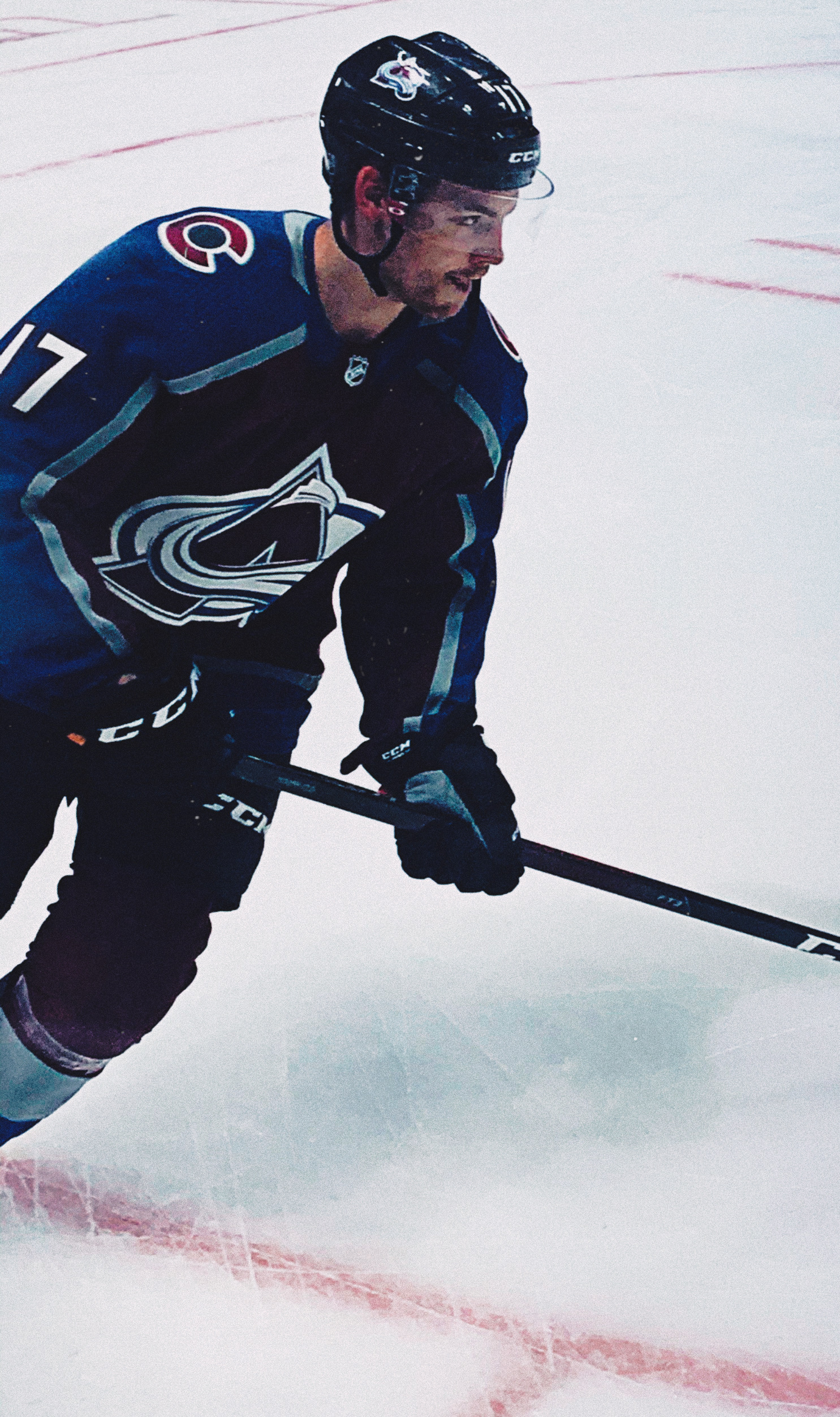
Tyson Jost

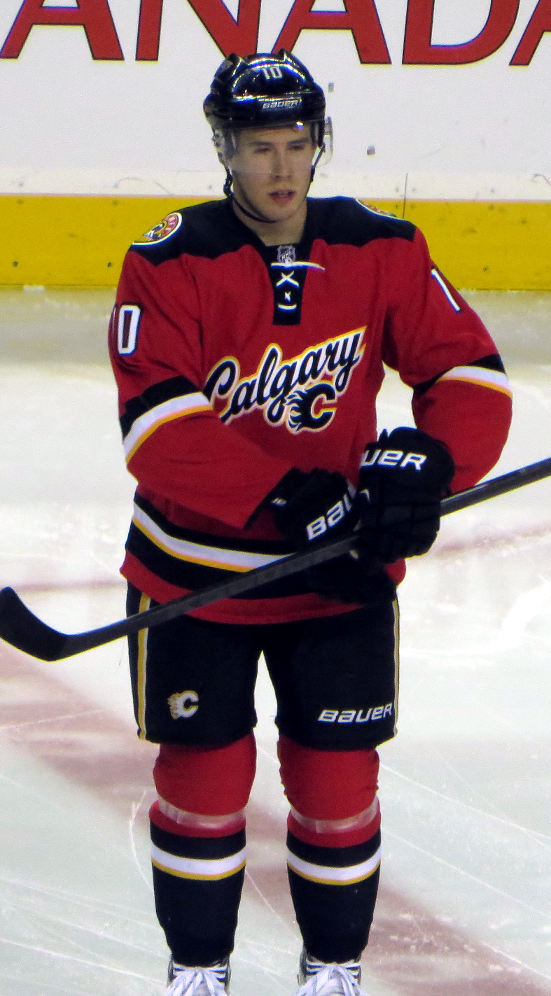
Corban Knight

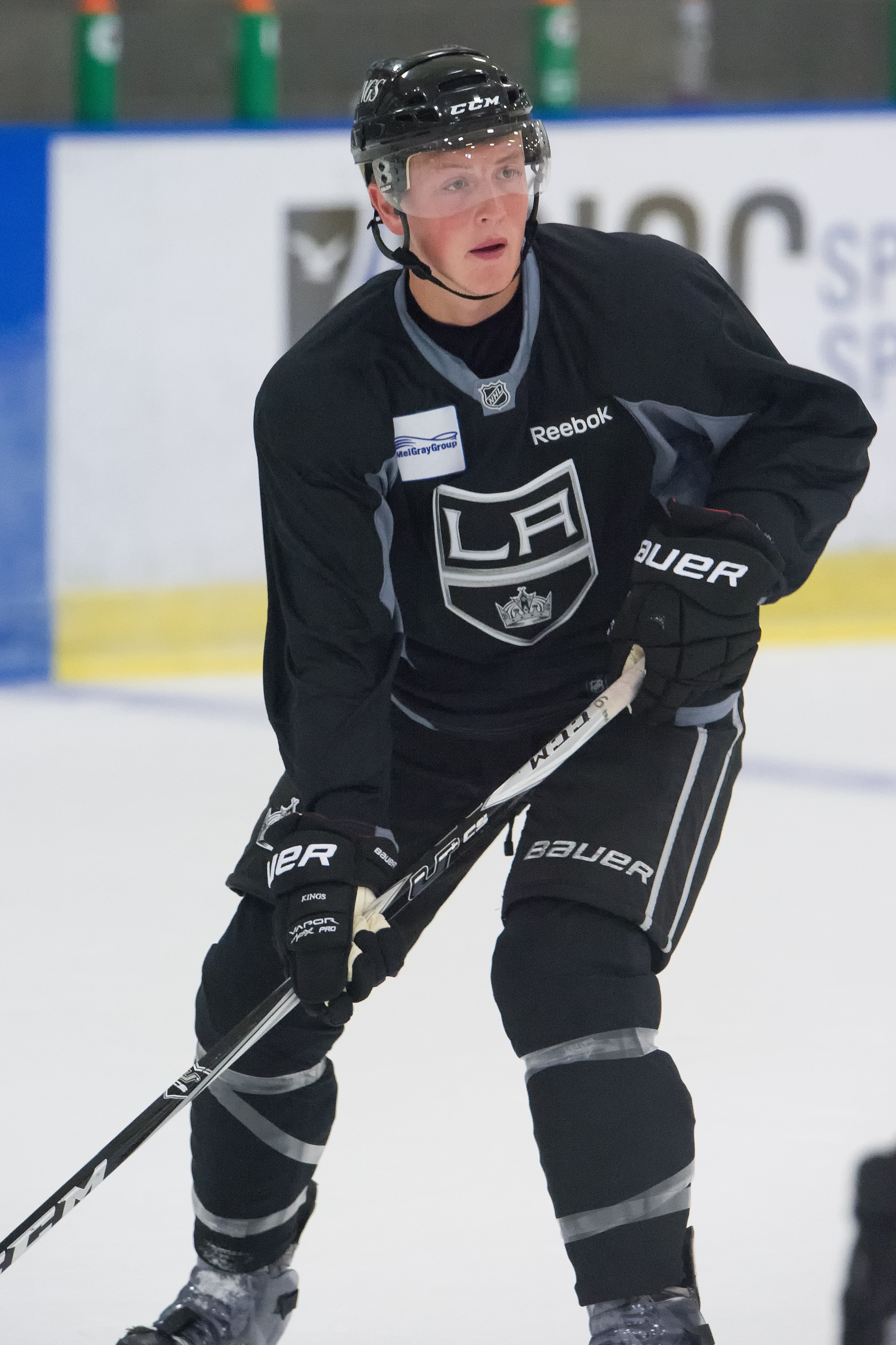
Paul LaDue

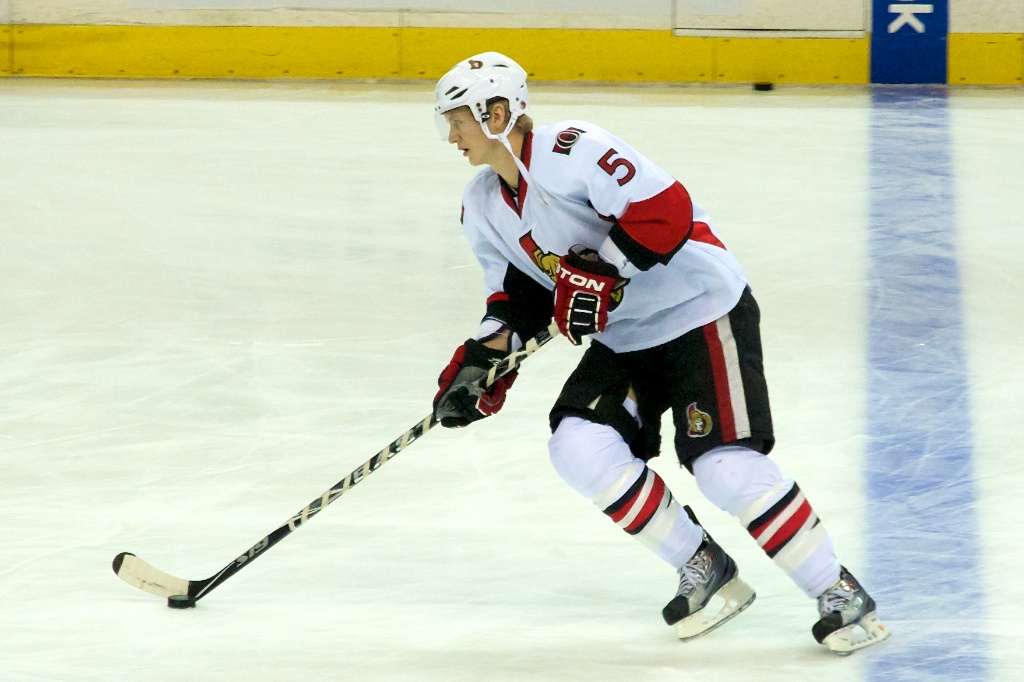
Brian Lee

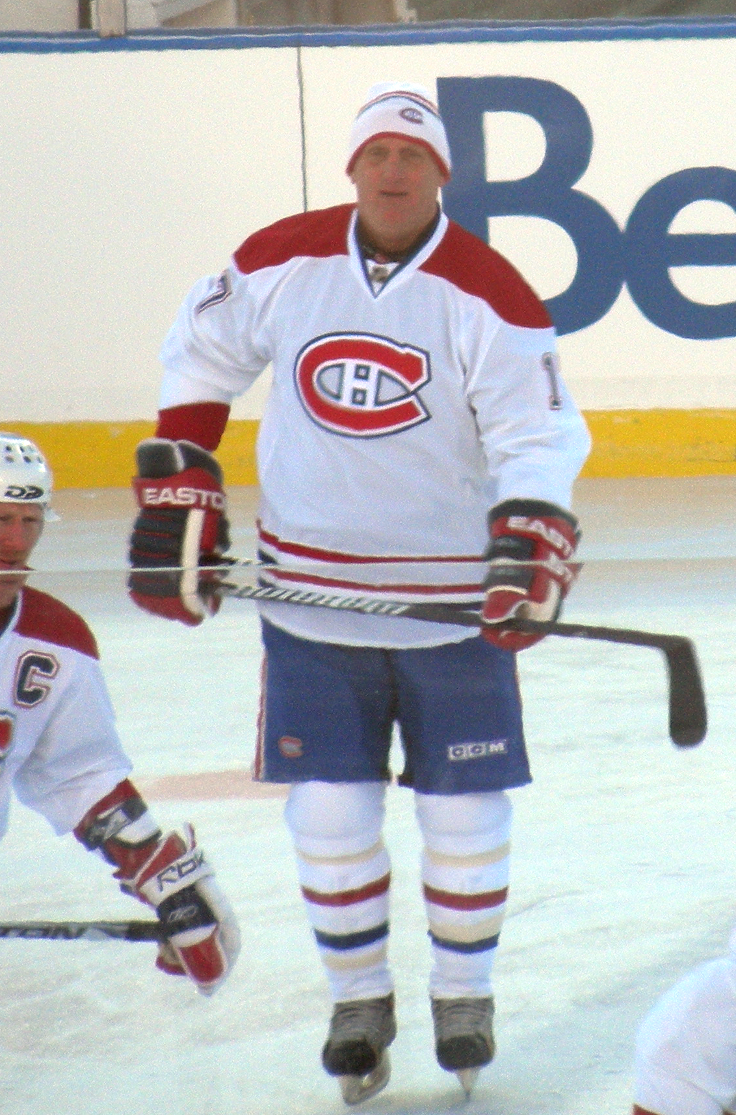
Craig Ludwig

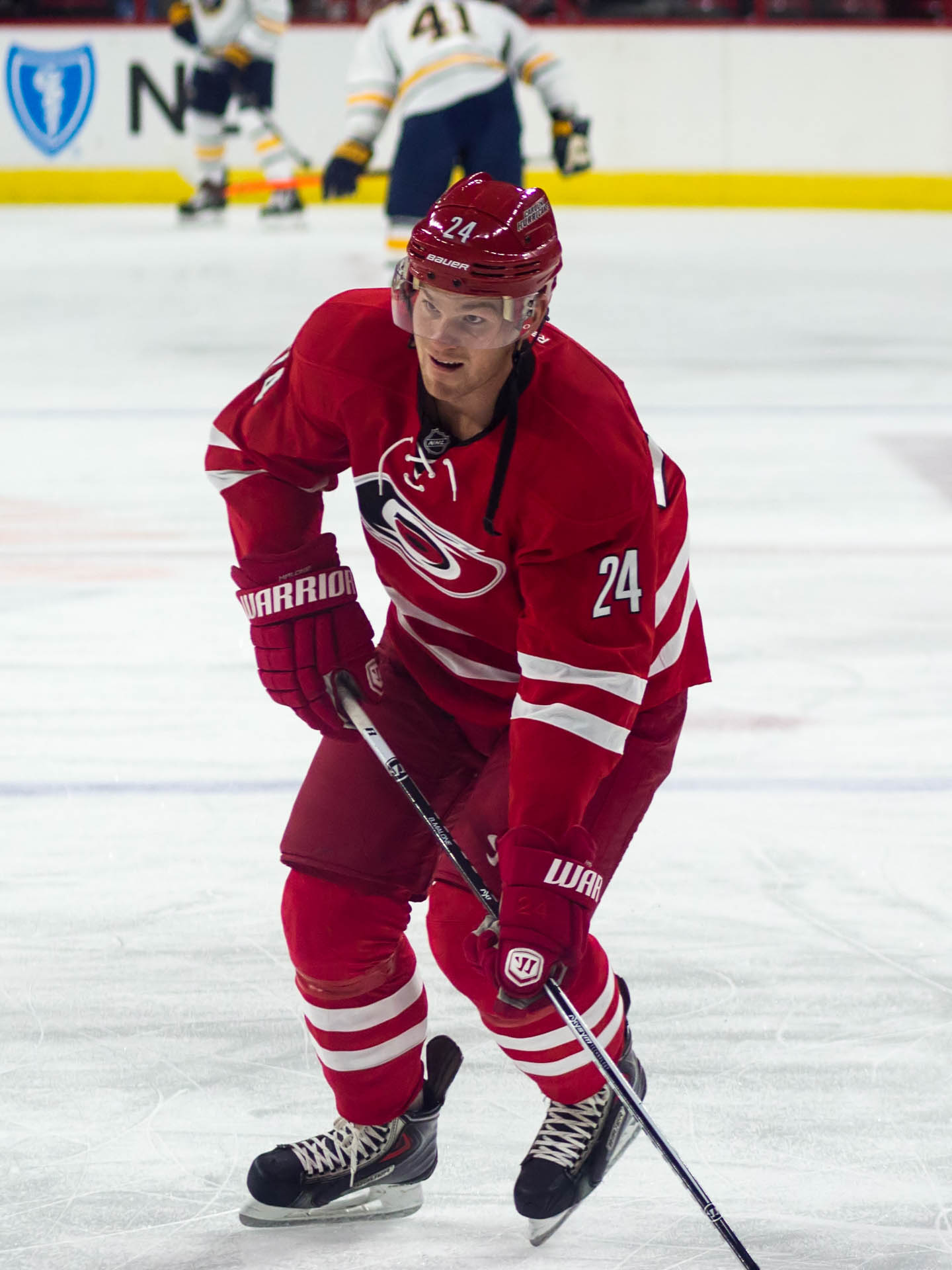
Brad Malone

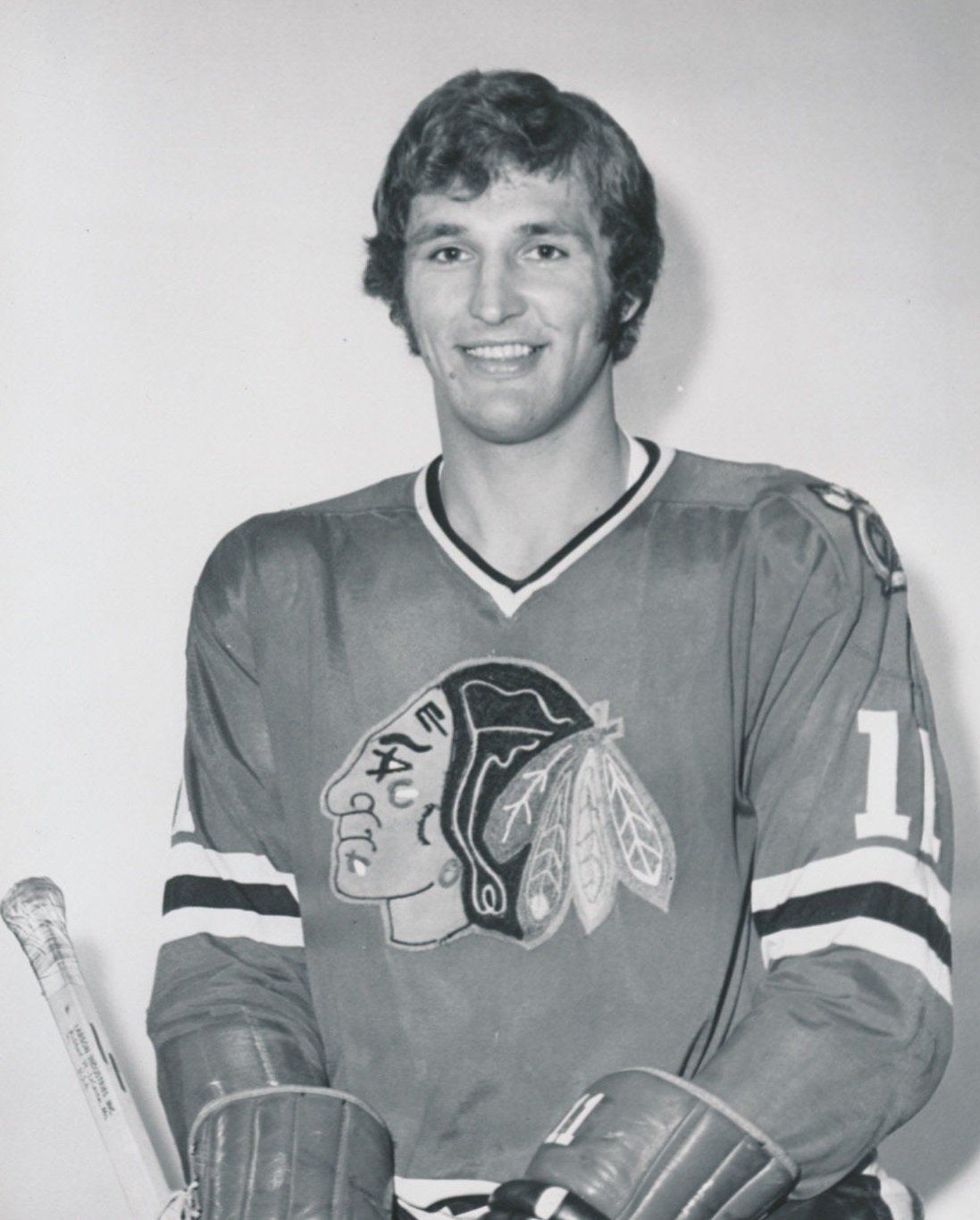
John Marks

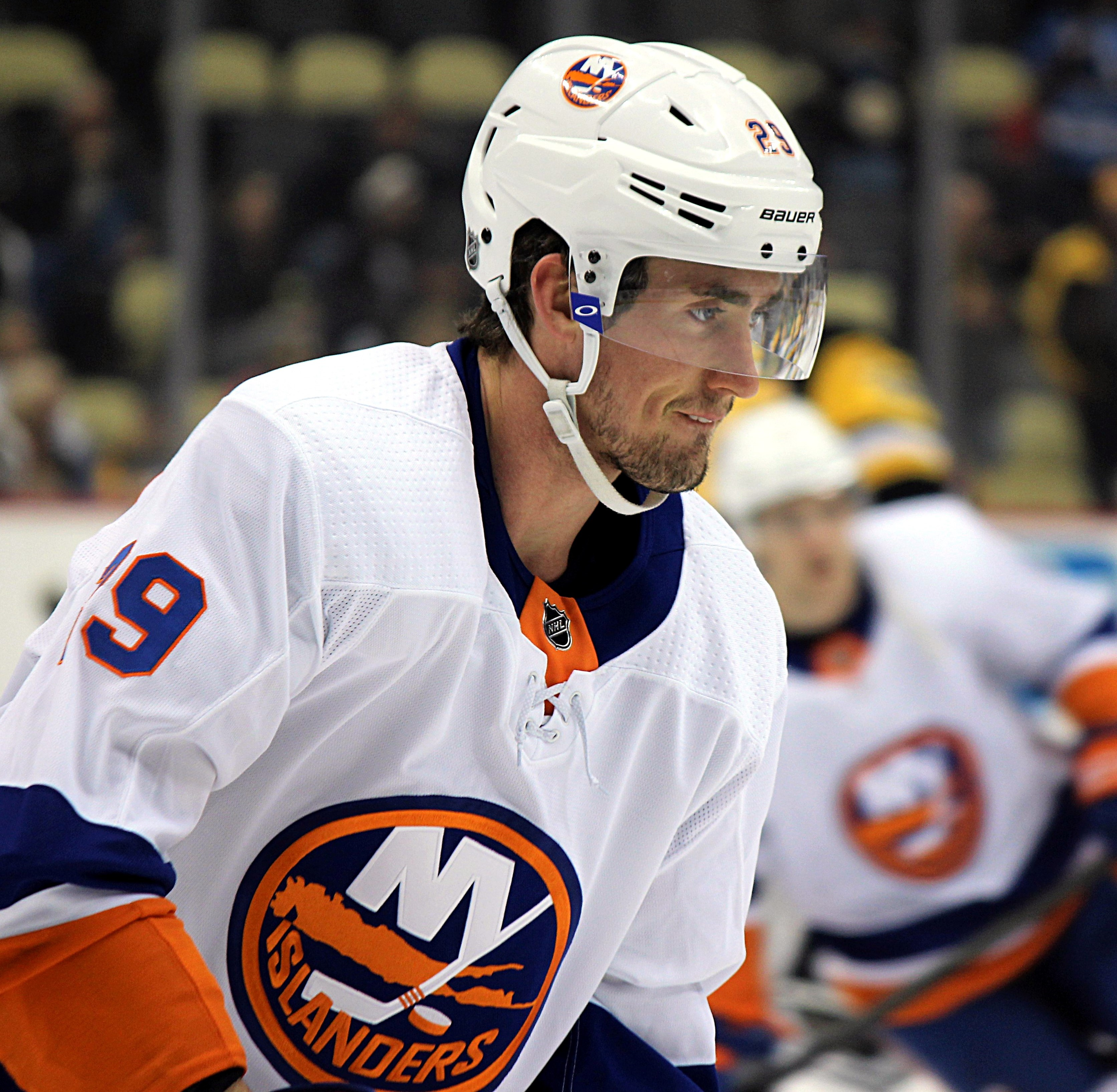
Brock Nelson

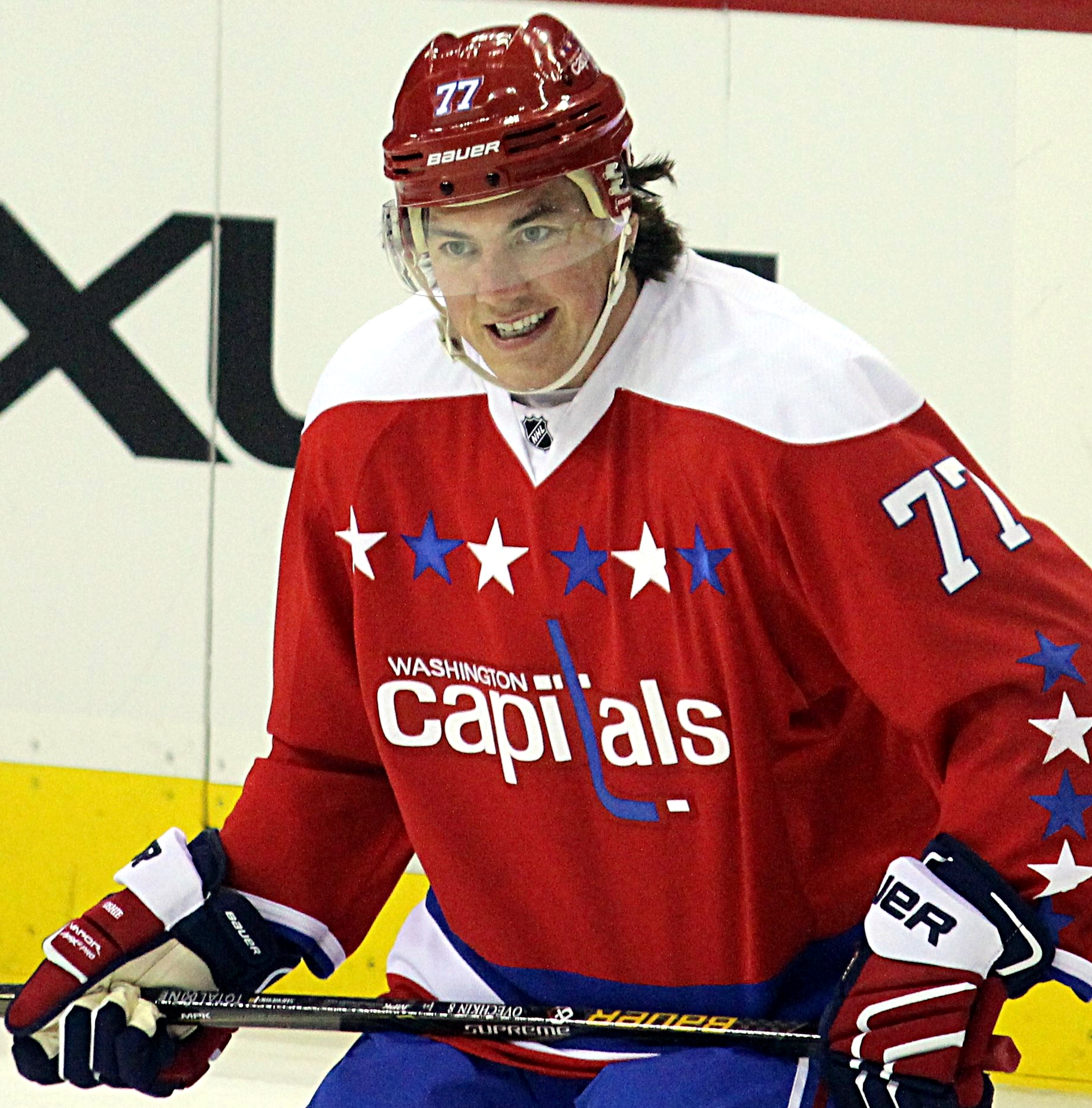
T. J. Oshie

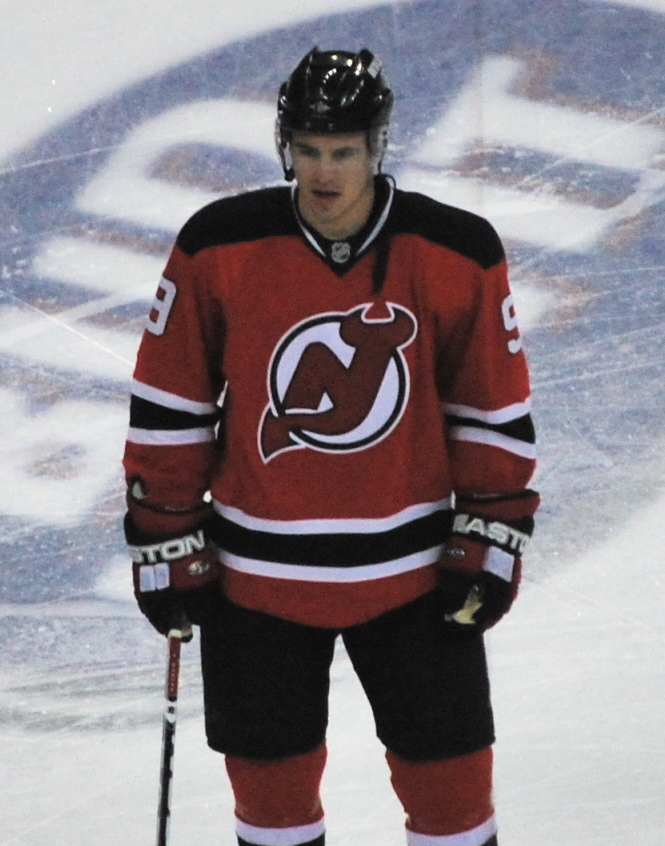
Zach Parise

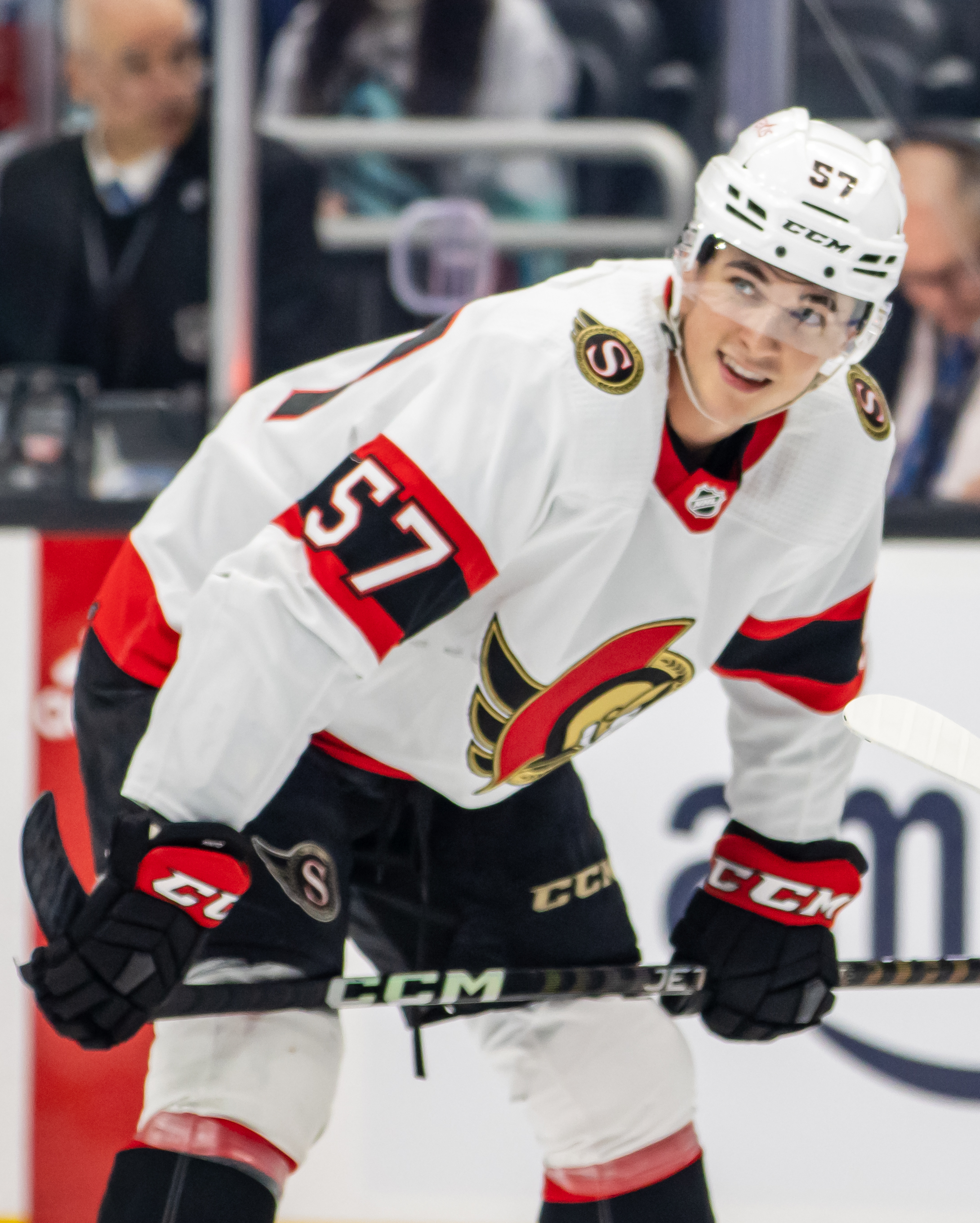
Shane Pinto

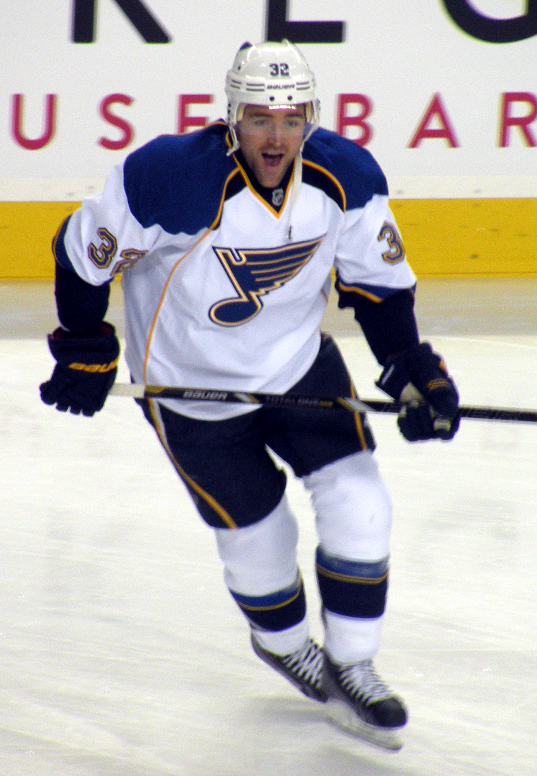
Chris Porter

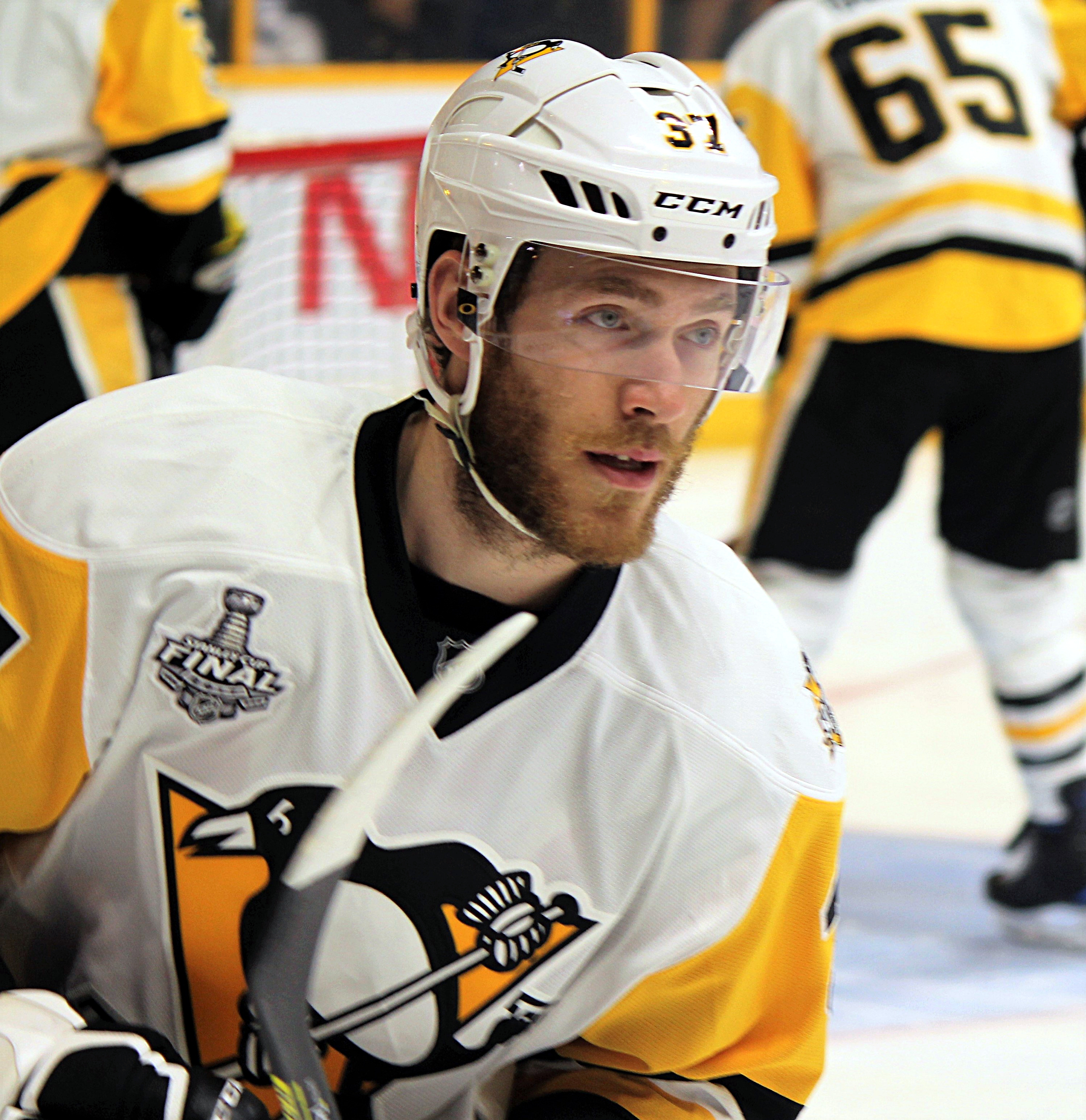
Carter Rowney

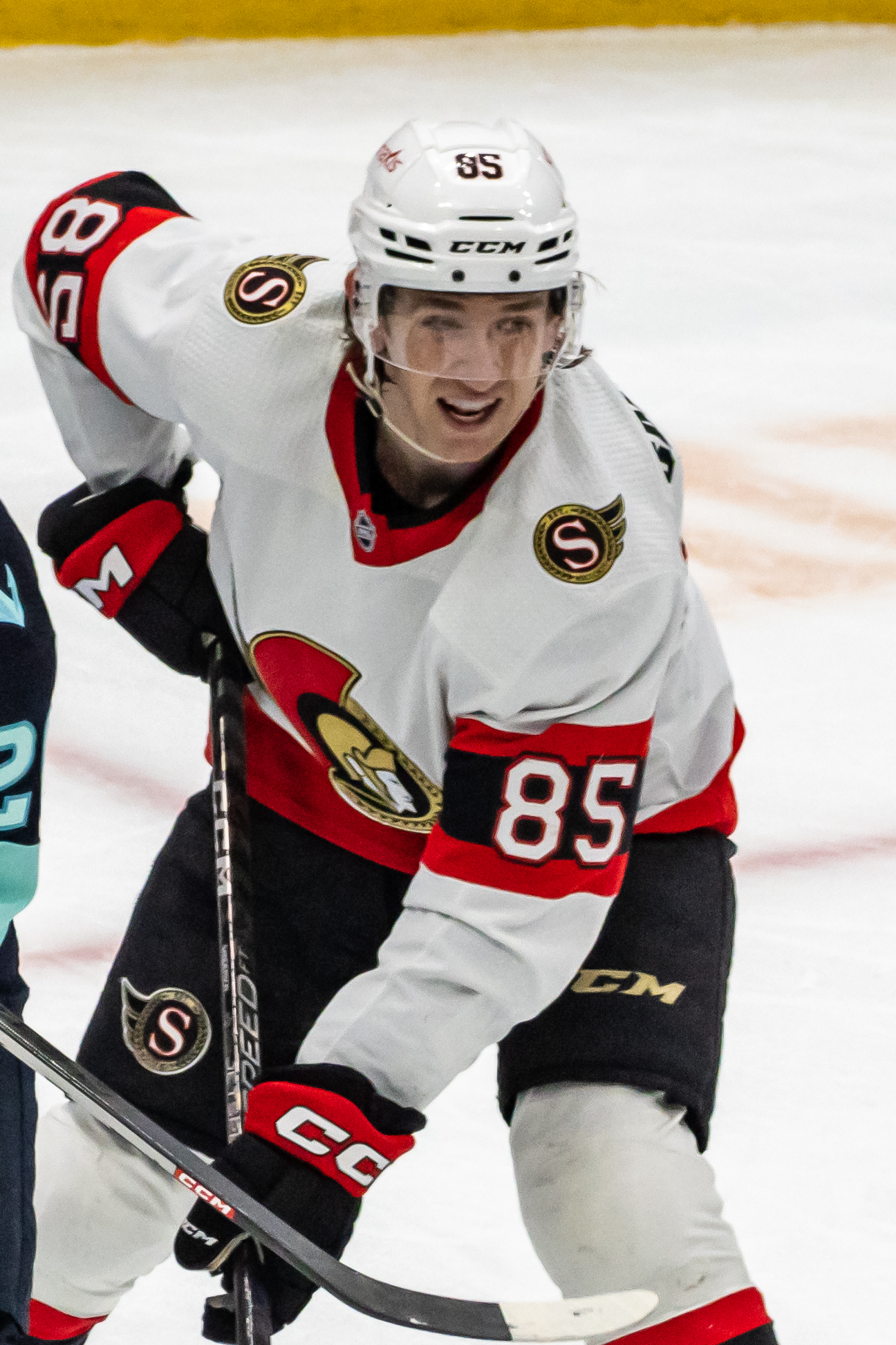
Jake Sanderson

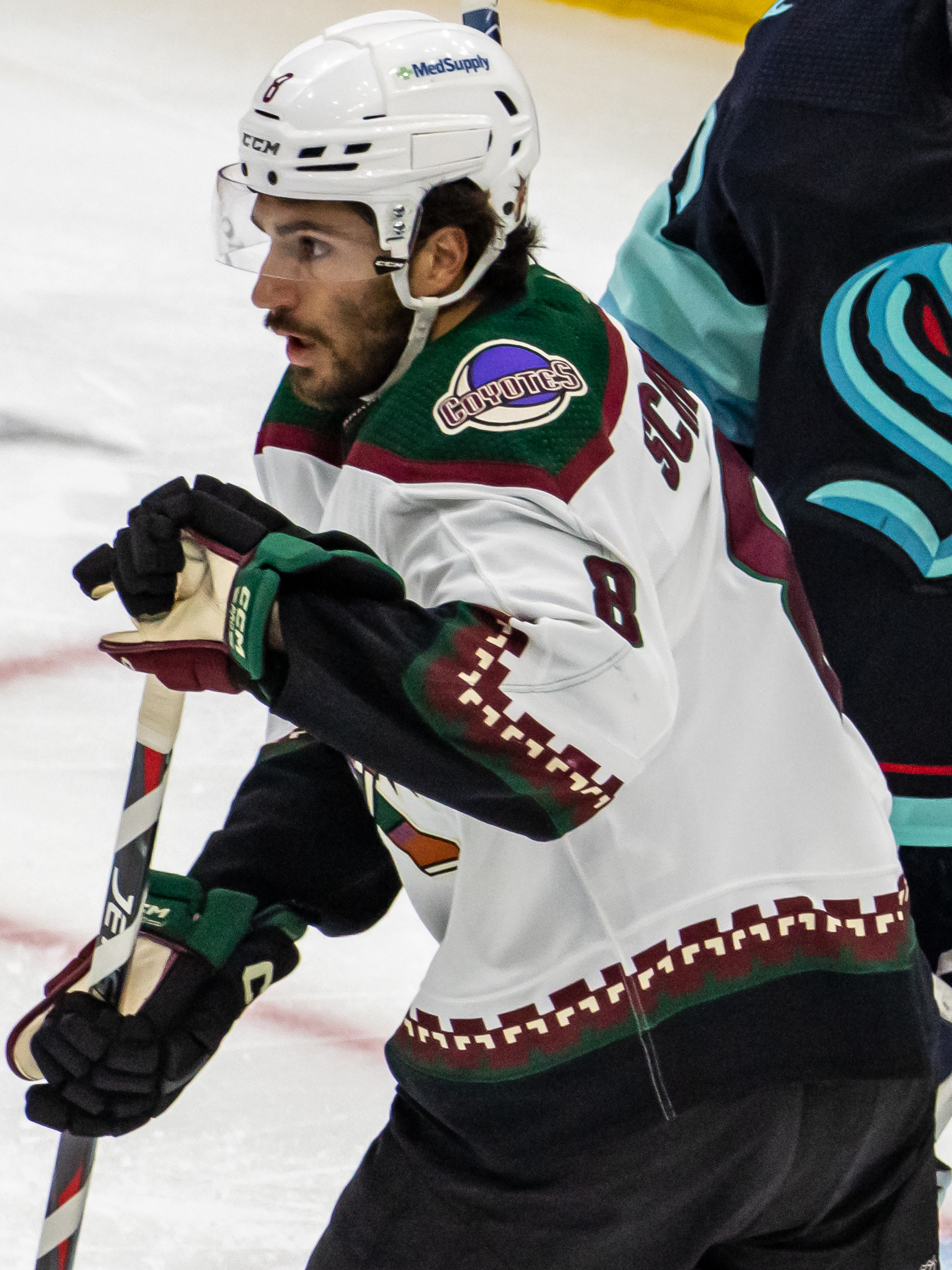
Nick Schmaltz

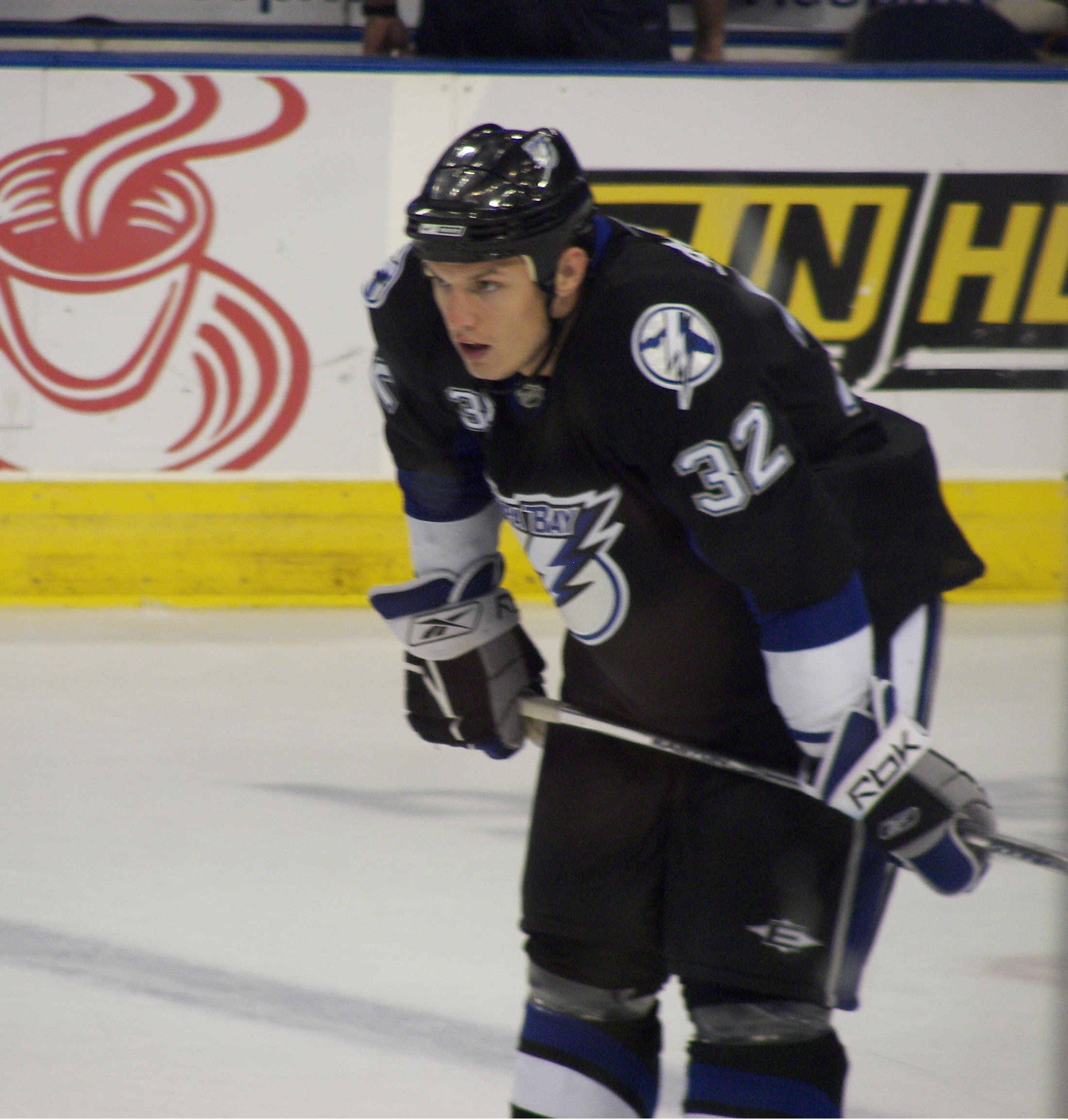
Matt Smaby

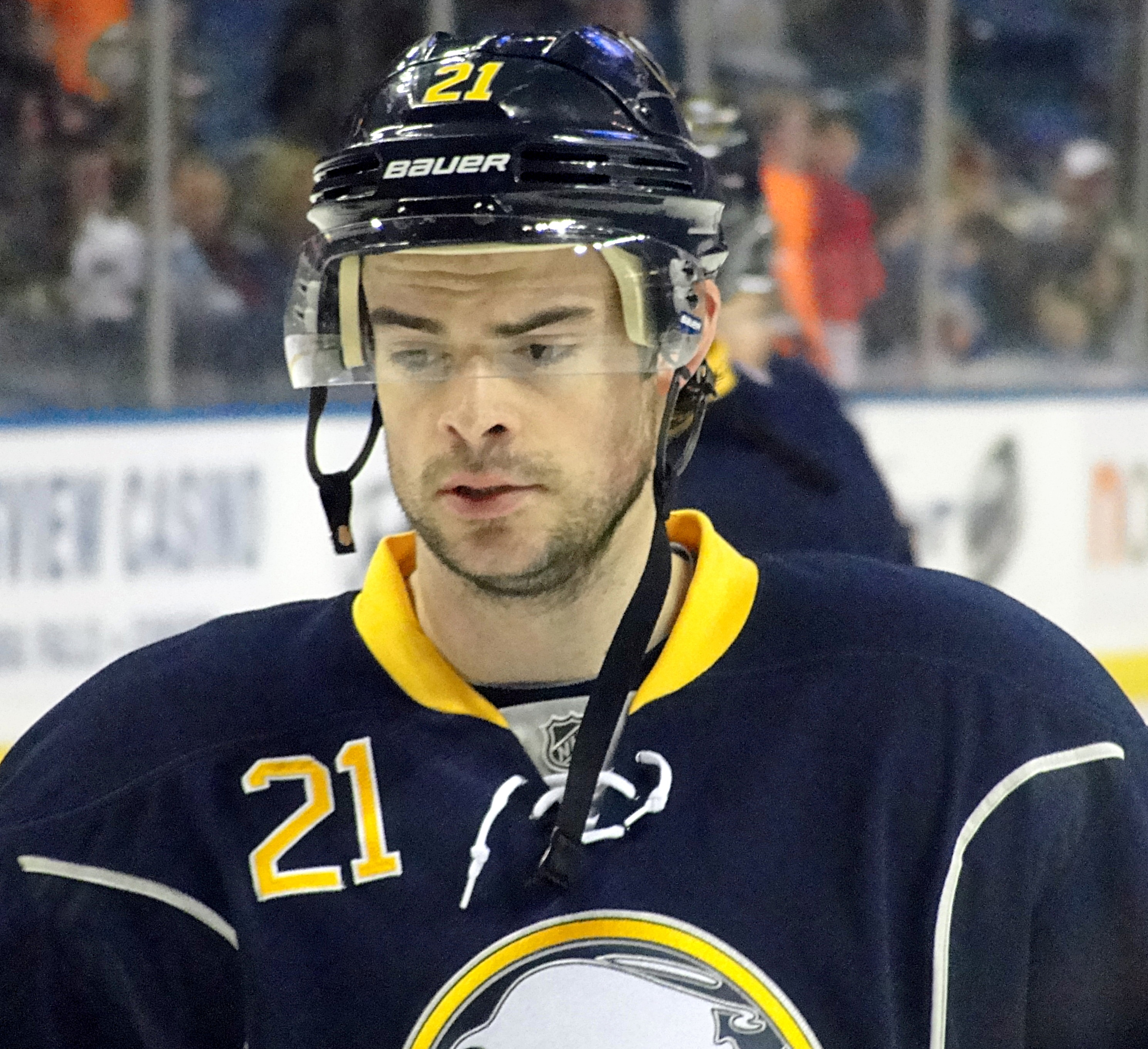
Drew Stafford

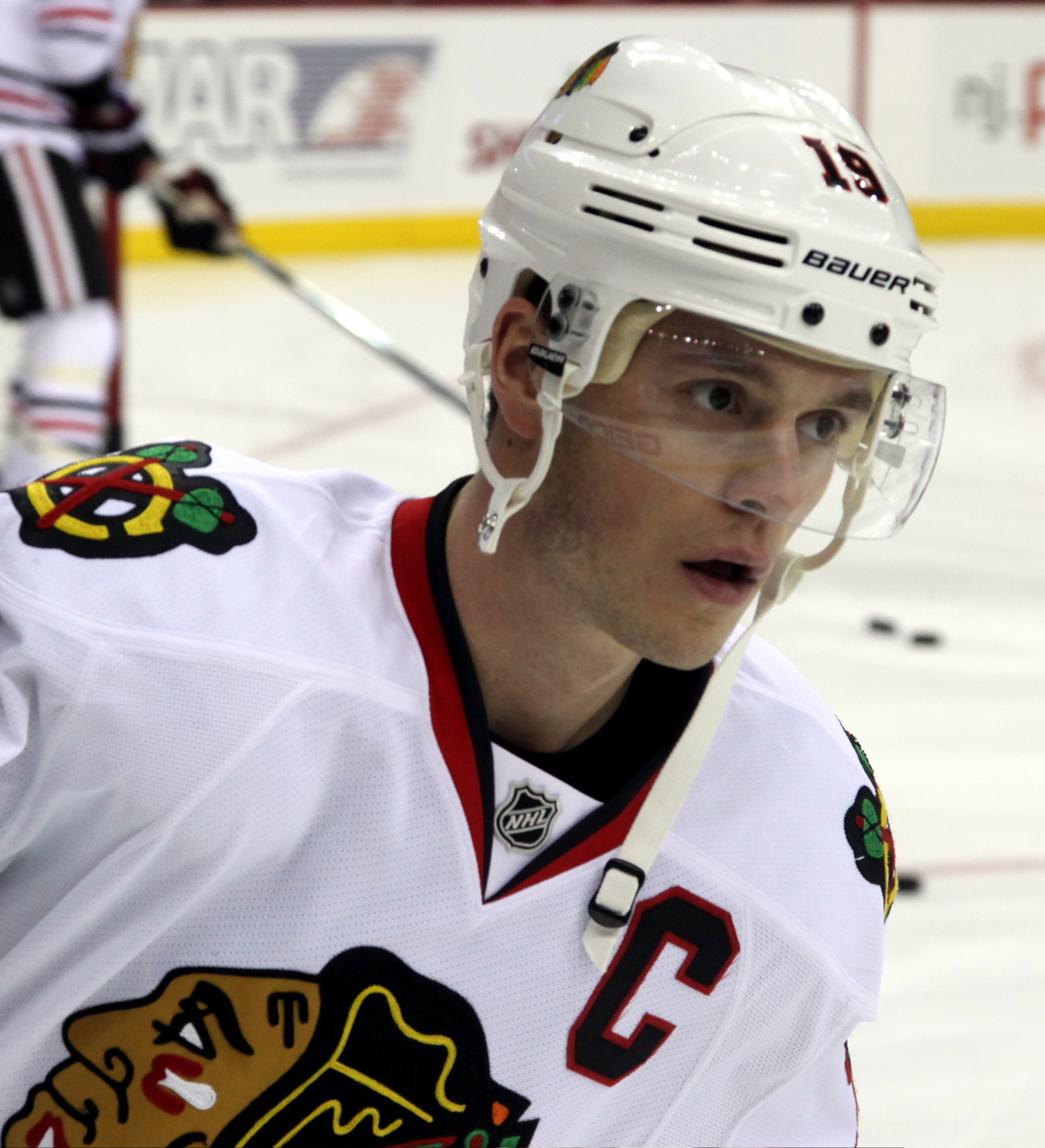
Jonathan Toews

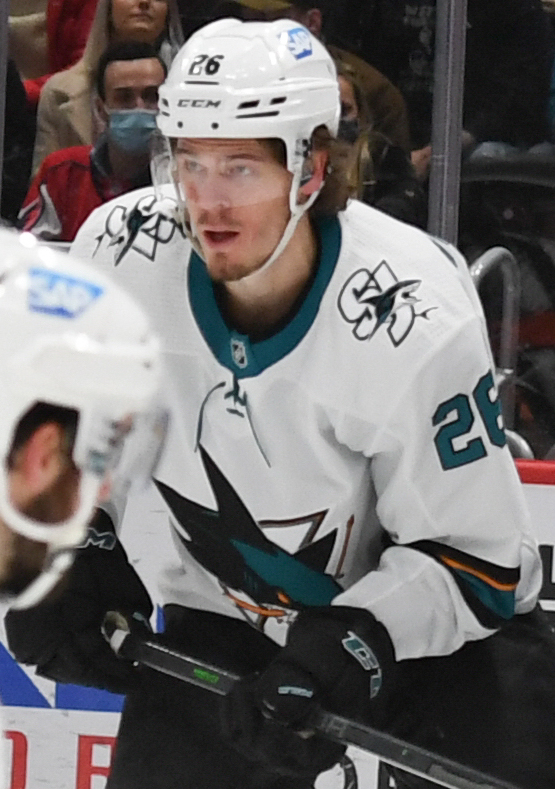
Jasper Weatherby

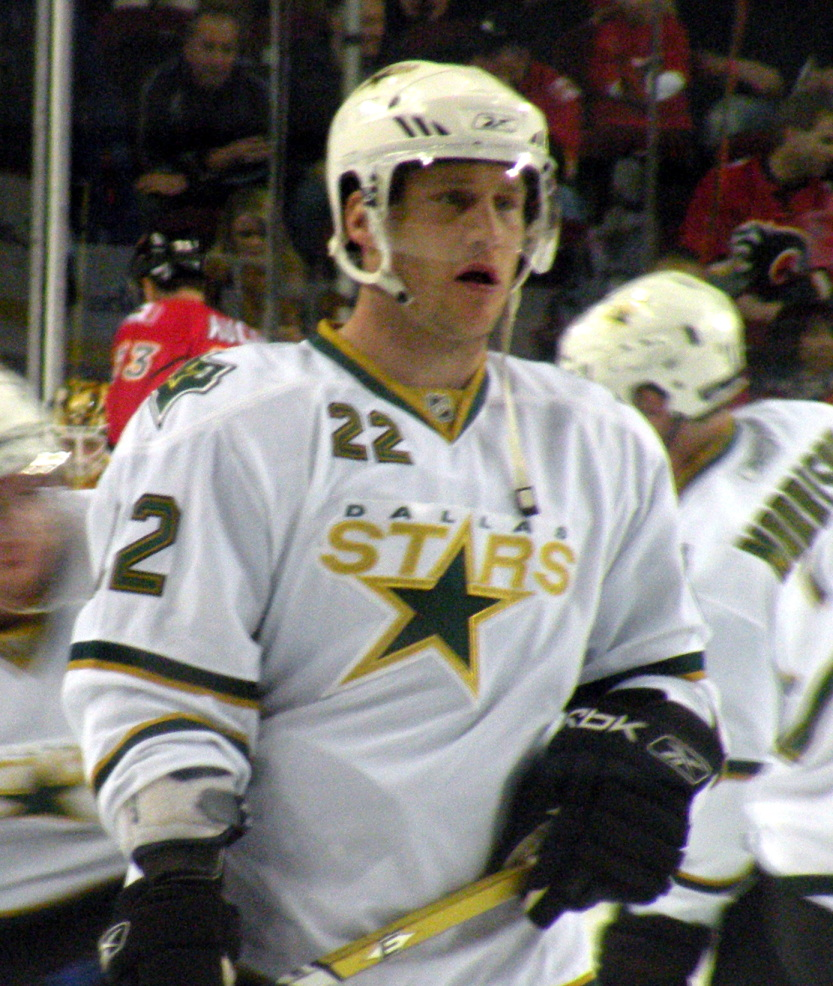
Landon Wilson

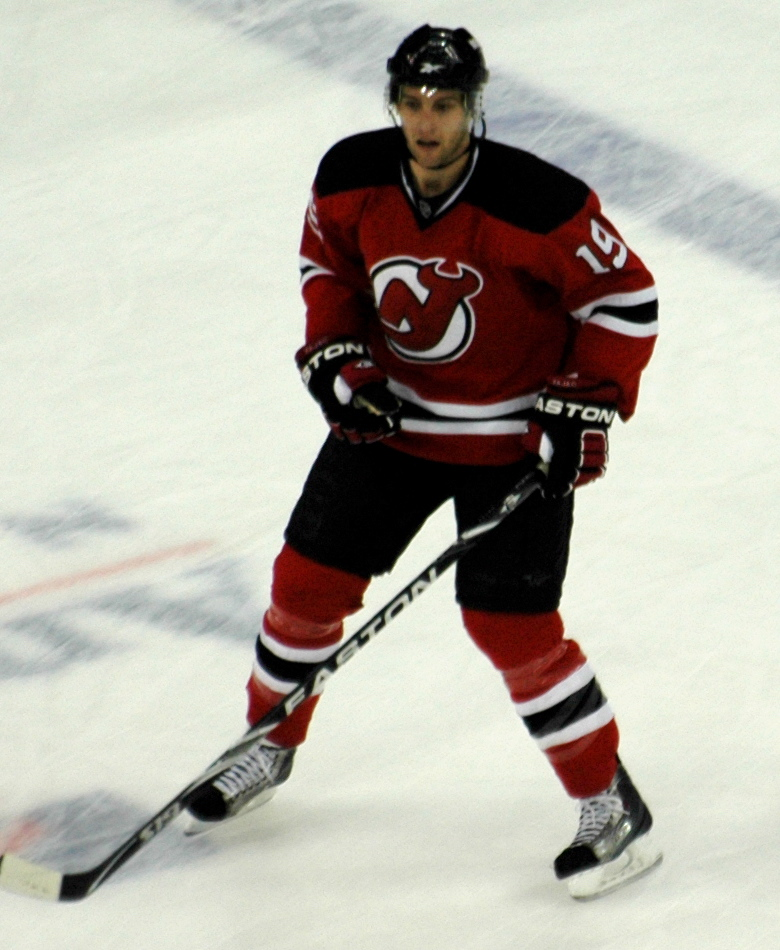
Travis Zajac

=== WHA ===
Two players also were members of WHA teams.

Player	Position	Team(s)	Years	Avco Cups
Mike Curran	Goaltender	MFS	1972–1977	0
Alan Hangsleben	Defenseman	NEW	1974–1979	0

== Awards and honors ==
=== Hockey Hall of Fame ===
- Ed Belfour (2011)

=== United States Hockey Hall of Fame ===
- Dave Christian (2001)
- Mike Curran (1998)
- Cal Marvin (1982)
- Fido Purpur (1974)
- Dean Blais (2020)
- Zach Parise (2025)

=== NCAA ===
==== Individual awards ====
Hobey Baker Award

- Tony Hrkac: 1987
- Ryan Duncan: 2007

Spencer Penrose Award

- John Gasparini: 1987
- Dean Blais: 1997, 2001
- Brad Berry: 2020

Mike Richter Award

- Zane McIntyre: 2015

NCAA Division I Ice Hockey Scoring Champion

- Tony Hrkac: 1987
- Steve Johnson: 1988
- Jeff Panzer: 2001

Senior CLASS Award

- Jordan Kawaguchi: 2021
- Zach Driscoll: 2022

Tournament Most Outstanding Player

- Reg Morelli: 1959
- Al McLean: 1963
- Doug Smail: 1980
- Phil Sykes: 1982
- Tony Hrkac: 1987
- Matt Henderson: 1997
- Lee Goren: 2000
- Drake Caggiula: 2016

==== All-Americans ====
AHCA First Team All-Americans

- 1950–51: John Noah, D
- 1952–53: Ben Cherski, F
- 1953–54: Spike Schultz, G; Ben Cherski, F
- 1954–55: Bill Reichart, F
- 1956–57: Bill Reichart, F
- 1957–58: Bill Steenson, F
- 1958–59: Bill Steenson, F
- 1959–60: Reg Morelli, F
- 1962–63: Don Ross, D; Al McLean, F; Dave Merrifield, F
- 1964–65: Don Ross, D
- 1965–66: Terry Casey, F
- 1966–67: Jerry Lafond, D
- 1967–68: Terry Abram, D; Bob Munro, F
- 1968–69: John Marks, D; Bob Munro, F
- 1969–70: John Marks, D
- 1971–72: Alan Hangsleben, D
- 1978–79: Bob Iwabuchi, G; Kevin Maxwell, F
- 1979–80: Howard Walker, D; Mark Taylor, F
- 1980–81: Marc Chorney, D
- 1982–83: James Patrick, D
- 1983–84: Jon Casey, G
- 1986–87: Ian Kidd, D; Tony Hrkac, F; Bob Joyce, F
- 1987–88: Steve Johnson, F
- 1989–90: Russ Parent, D
- 1990–91: Greg Johnson, F
- 1992–93: Greg Johnson, F
- 1997–98: Curtis Murphy, F
- 1998–99: Brad Williamson, D; Jason Blake, F
- 1999-00: Karl Goehring, G; Jeff Panzer, F
- 2000–01: Travis Roche, D; Jeff Panzer, F
- 2003–04: Brandon Bochenski, F; Zach Parise, F
- 2006–07: Ryan Duncan, F; Jonathan Toews, F
- 2007–08: T. J. Oshie, F
- 2010–11: Chay Genoway, D; Matt Frattin, F
- 2012–13: Danny Kristo, F
- 2015–16: Brock Boeser, F
- 2016–17: Tucker Poolman, D
- 2019–20: Jordan Kawaguchi, F
- 2020–21: Shane Pinto, F
- 2021–22: Jake Sanderson, D
- 2023–24: Jackson Blake, F

AHCA Second Team All-Americans

- 1949–50: Daniel McKinnon, D; Buzz Johnson, F
- 1956–57: Bill Steenson, F
- 1985–86: Scott Sandelin, D
- 1986–87: Ed Belfour, G
- 1990–91: Lee Davidson, F
- 1991–92: Greg Johnson, F
- 1995–96: Teeder Wynne, F
- 1996–97: Curtis Murphy, D; David Hoogsteen, F
- 1997–98: Karl Goehring, G; Jason Blake, F
- 1998–99: Jay Panzer, F
- 1999-00: Lee Goren, F
- 2000–01: Bryan Lundbohm, F
- 2006–07: Taylor Chorney, D
- 2008–09: Chay Genoway, D
- 2010–11: Aaron Dell, G
- 2012–13: Corban Knight, F
- 2014–15: Zane McIntyre, G
- 2015–16: Cam Johnson, G; Troy Stecher, D; Drake Caggiula, F
- 2020–21: Matt Kiersted, D; Jordan Kawaguchi, F
- 2024–25: Jake Livanavage, D

=== WCHA ===
==== Individual awards ====
Player of the Year

- Gerry Kell, F: 1965
- Phil Sykes, F: 1982
- Tony Hrkac, F: 1987
- Curtis Murphy, D: 1998
- Jason Blake, F: 1999
- Jeff Panzer, F: 2001
- Ryan Duncan, F: 2007
- Matt Frattin, F: 2011

Outstanding Student-Athlete of the Year

- Steve Johnson, F: 1988
- Mitch Vig, D: 1998
- Karl Goehring, G: 2001
- Chay Genoway, D: 2011
- Brad Eidsness, G: 2012

Coach of the Year

- Barry Thorndycraft: 1963
- Bob Peters: 1965
- Bill Selman: 1967
- John Gasparini: 1979, 1982, 1987
- Dean Blais: 1997, 1999, 2001
- Dave Hakstol: 2009

Freshman/Rookie of the Year

- Alan Hangsleben, D: 1972
- Kevin Maxwell, F: 1979
- James Patrick, D: 1982
- Landon Wilson, F: 1994
- Karl Goehring, G: 1998
- Brandon Bochenski, F: 2002
- Brady Murray, F: 2004
- Danny Kristo, F: 2010

Sophomore of the Year

- Bob Munro, F: 1967

Defensive Player of the Year

- Matt Henderson, D: 1998
- Brad Williamson, D: 1999
- Chay Genoway, D: 2009

Most Valuable Player in tournament

- David Hoogsteen, LW: 1997
- Lee Goren, RW: 2000
- Jordan Parise, G: 2006
- Evan Trupp, LW: 2010
- Matt Frattin, RW: 2011
- Aaron Dell, G: 2012

==== All-Conference Teams ====
First Team All-WCHA

- 1952–53: Ben Cherski, F
- 1953–54: Ben Cherski, F
- 1954–55: Bill Reichart, F
- 1955–56: Bill Reichart, F
- 1956–57: Bill Steenson, D; Bill Reichart, F
- 1957–58: Bill Steenson, D
- 1959–60: Reg Morelli, F
- 1962–63: Don Ross, D; Dave Merrifield, F
- 1964–65: Don Ross, D; Gerry Kell, F
- 1965–66: Terry Casey, F; Dennis Hextall, F
- 1966–67: Jerry Lafond, F
- 1967–68: Mike Curran, G; Terry Abram, D; Bob Munro, F
- 1968–69: Terry Abram, D; Bob Munro, F
- 1969–70: John Marks, D
- 1971–72: Alan Hangsleben, D; Jim Cahoon, F
- 1977–78: Bill Himmelright, F
- 1978–79: Bob Iwabuchi, G; Kevin Maxwell, F
- 1979–80: Howard Walker, D; Mark Taylor, F
- 1980–81: Marc Chorney, D
- 1981–82: Jon Casey, G; Phil Sykes, F
- 1982–83: James Patrick, D
- 1983–84: Jon Casey, G; Dan Brennan, F
- 1984–85: Jim Archibald, F
- 1985–86: Scott Sandelin, D
- 1986–87: Ed Belfour, G; Ian Kidd, D; Tony Hrkac, F; Bob Joyce, F
- 1987–88: Steve Johnson, F
- 1989–90: Russ Parent, D
- 1990–91: Russ Romaniuk, F; Greg Johnson, F
- 1991–92: Greg Johnson, F
- 1992–93: Greg Johnson, F
- 1994–95: Nick Naumenko, D
- 1995–96: Nick Naumenko, D; Teeder Wynne, F
- 1996–97: Curtis Murphy, D; Jason Blake, F; David Hoogsteen, F
- 1997–98: Karl Goehring, G; Curtis Murphy, D; Jason Blake, F
- 1998–99: Brad Williamson, D; Jason Blake, F
- 1999-00: Karl Goehring, D; Jeff Panzer, F
- 2000–01: Travis Roche, D; Jeff Panzer, F; Bryan Lundbohm, F
- 2003–04: Brandon Bochenski, F; Zach Parise, F
- 2006–07: Ryan Duncan, F
- 2007–08: Taylor Chorney, D; T. J. Oshie, F
- 2008–09: Chay Genoway, D
- 2010–11: Aaron Dell, G; Chay Genoway, D; Matt Frattin, F
- 2012–13: Danny Kristo, F

Second Team All-WCHA

- 1951–52: Elwood Shell, D
- 1952–53: Elwood Shell, D
- 1953–54: Spike Schultz, G
- 1956–57: Tom Yurkovich, G
- 1957–58: Jim Ridley, F
- 1959–60: Guy LaFrance, D
- 1960–61: Bill Colpitts, F
- 1962–63: Joe Lech, G; Al McLean, F
- 1964–65: Joe Lech, G; Dennis Hextall, F
- 1968–69: John Marks, D; Dave Kartio, F
- 1971–72: Rick Wilson, D
- 1976–77: Roger Lamoureux, F
- 1979–80: Marc Chorney, D; Doug Smail, F
- 1980–81: Troy Murray, F
- 1981–82: James Patrick, D; Craig Ludwig, D; Troy Murray, F
- 1982–83: Jon Casey, G; Dave Tippett, F
- 1983–84: Rick Zombo, D
- 1988–89: Russ Parent, D
- 1989–90: Jason Herter, D; Lee Davidson, F
- 1990–91: Jason Herter, D; Dixon Ward, F
- 1991–92: Dixon Ward, F
- 1997–98: David Hoogsteen, F
- 1998–99: Karl Goehring, G; Trevor Hammer, D; Jay Panzer, F; Jeff Panzer, F
- 1999-00: Lee Goren, F
- 2000–01: Ryan Bayda, F
- 2001–02: Ryan Bayda, F
- 2002–03: Brandon Bochenski, F
- 2003–04: Matt Jones, F
- 2006–07: Taylor Chorney, D; Jonathan Toews, F
- 2007–08: Jean-Philippe Lamoureux, G; Chay Genoway, D; Ryan Duncan, F
- 2008–09: Ryan Duncan, F
- 2009–10: Brad Eidsness, G
- 2012–13: Corban Knight, F

Third Team All-WCHA

- 1996–97: Dane Litke, F
- 1998–99: Lee Goren, F
- 1999–00: Jason Ulmer, F
- 2002–03: Andy Schneider, D; David Hale, D; Zach Parise, F
- 2003–04: Brady Murray, F
- 2004–05: Matt Jones, F
- 2005–06: Jordan Parise, G; Matt Smaby, D; Drew Stafford, F
- 2006–07: T. J. Oshie, F
- 2007–08: Robbie Bina, D
- 2008–09: Brad Eidsness, G
- 2009–10: Chay Genoway, D
- 2010–11: Jason Gregoire, F
- 2011–12: Ben Blood, D; Brock Nelson, F

All-WCHA Rookie Team

- 1992–93: Nick Naumenko, D
- 1993–94: Toby Kvalevog, G; Landon Wilson, F
- 1997–98: Karl Goehring, G; Trevor Hammer, D; Jeff Panzer, F
- 1999–00: Travis Roche, D; Ryan Bayda, F
- 2001–02: Brandon Bochenski, F
- 2002–03: Zach Parise, F
- 2003–04: Brady Murray, F
- 2004–05: Travis Zajac, F
- 2005–06: Brian Lee, D; T. J. Oshie, F
- 2008–09: Brad Eidsness, G
- 2009–10: Danny Kristo, F
- 2012–13: Rocco Grimaldi, F

=== NCHC ===
==== Individual awards ====
Player of the Year

- Shane Pinto: 2021
- Jackson Blake: 2024

Rookie of the Year

- Brock Boeser: 2016
- Shane Pinto: 2020
- Jackson Blake: 2023

Goaltender of the Year

- Zane McIntyre: 2015
- Adam Scheel: 2021

Forward of the Year

- Jordan Kawaguchi: 2020
- Shane Pinto: 2021
- Jackson Blake: 2024

Defensive Forward of the Year

- Mark MacMillan: 2015
- Rhett Gardner: 2018
- Shane Pinto: 2021
- Connor Ford: 2022

Defensive Defenseman of the Year

- Tucker Poolman: 2017
- Colton Poolman: 2020
- Jacob Bernard-Docker: 2021
- Ethan Frisch: 2022

Scholar-Athlete of the Year

- Nick Mattson; 2015
- Ethan Frisch: 2023

Sportsmanship Award

- Matt Hrynkiw: 2017
- Mark Senden: 2022

Herb Brooks Coach of the Year

- Dave Hakstol: 2015
- Brad Berry: 2016, 2020, 2021, 2022

Frozen Faceoff MVP

- Riese Gaber: 2021

==== All-Conference Teams ====
First Team All-NCHC

- 2013–14: Dillon Simpson, D
- 2014–15: Zane McIntyre, G; Mark MacMillan, F
- 2015–16: Brock Boeser, F; Drake Caggiula, F
- 2016–17: Tucker Poolman, D
- 2019–20: Jordan Kawaguchi, F
- 2020–21: Adam Scheel, G; Matt Kiersted, D; Shane Pinto, F; Jordan Kawaguchi, F
- 2021–22: Riese Gaber, F
- 2022–23: Chris Jandric, D
- 2023–24: Jackson Blake, F
- 2024–25: Jake Livanavage, D

Second Team All-NCHC

- 2013–14: Jordan Schmaltz, D; Michael Parks, F
- 2014–15: Jordan Schmaltz, D; Drake Caggiula, F
- 2015–16: Cam Johnson, G; Troy Stecher, D
- 2017–18: Christian Wolanin, D
- 2019–20: Matt Kiersted, D
- 2020–21: Jacob Bernard-Docker, D
- 2021–22: Zach Driscoll, G; Jake Sanderson, D
- 2022–23: Jackson Blake, F; Riese Gaber, F
- 2023–24: Ludvig Persson, G

NCHC All-Rookie Team

- 2013–14: Paul LaDue, D
- 2014–15: Nick Schmaltz, F
- 2015–16: Brock Boeser, F
- 2016–17: Tyson Jost, F
- 2017–18: Grant Mismash, F
- 2018–19: Adam Scheel, D
- 2019–20: Shane Pinto, F
- 2020–21: Jake Sanderson, D
- 2021–22: Jakob Hellsten, G; Matteo Costantini, F
- 2022–23: Jackson Blake, F
- 2024–25: Sacha Boisvert, F

=== Retired numbers ===
No.	Player	Position	Tenure	Date of Retirement
12	Terry Casey	F	1963–1966	February 2, 1968
23	Ralph Engelstad	G	1948–1950	December 7, 2002

== In-season tournaments records ==
- Badger Showdown 6 games: 4–2–0
- Great Lakes Invitational 8 games: 5–3–0
- Ice Breaker Invitational 6 games: 1–4–1
- Lefty McFadden Invitational 2 games: 1–1–0
- Pepsi Cola Tournament 2 games: 2–0–0
- Kendell Hockey Classic 5 games: 4–0–1
- Rensselaer Holiday Tournament 5 games: 4–1–0
- Shillelagh Tournament 2 games: 1–1–0

== Arenas ==
- Winter Sports Building (The Old Barn) 1946–1972
- Old Ralph Engelstad Arena 1972–2001 (Host of the 1983 NCAA Frozen Four)
- Ralph Engelstad Arena 2001–present (Host of the 2006 NCAA West Regional and Host of the 2011 Icebreaker Invitational)

== Program records ==
=== Career ===
- Most games played in a career: Chris Porter, 175, (2003–2007) and Ryan Duncan, 175, (2005–2009)
- Most goals in a career: Ben Cherski, 131, (1951–1955)
- Most assists in a career: Greg Johnson, 198, (1989–1993)
- Most points in a career: Greg Johnson, 272, (1989–1993)
- Best career points per game (min. 75 games played): Tony Hrkac, 2.02 PPG (1984–1985, 1986–1987)
- Most career power play goals: Mark Taylor, 43, (1976–1980)
- Most career shorthanded goals: Russ Romaniuk, 12, (1988–1991)
- Most career game winning goals: Mark Taylor, 18, (1976–1980)
- Most penalty minutes in a career: Jim Archibald, 540, (1981–1985)
- Most points in a career, defenseman: Bill Himmelright, 149, (1975–1979)
- Most goals in a career, defenseman: Nick Naumenko, 38, (1992–1996)
- Most assists in a career, defenseman: Bill Himmelright, 121, (1975–1979)
- Most wins in a career: Karl Goehring, 80, (1997–2001)
- Most shutouts in a career: Karl Goehring, 15, (1997–2001)
- Best win percentage in a career: Karl Goehring, .765, (1997–2001)
- Best goals against average in a career: Zane McIntyre, 2.10, (2012–2015)
- Best save percentage in a career: Zane McIntyre, .926, (2012–2015)

=== Season ===
Players

- Most goals in a season: Bob Joyce, 52, (1986–1987)
- Most assists in a season: Tony Hrkac, 70, (1986–1987)
- Most points in a season: Tony Hrkac, 116, (1986–1987)
- Best points per game in a season (min. 20 games): Tony Hrkac, 2.42, (1986–1987)
- Most power play goals in a season: Ryan Duncan, 17, (2006–2007) and Doug Smail, 17, (1979–1980)
- Most shorthanded goals in a season: Tony Hrkac, 8, (1986–1987) and Doug Smail, 8, (1979–1980)
- Most game winning goals in a season: T. J. Oshie, 9, (2005–2006)
- Most penalty minutes in a season: Jim Archibald, 197, (1984–85)
- Most points in a season, defenseman: Ian Kidd, 60, (1986–1987)
- Most goals in a season, defenseman: Nick Naumenko, 13, (1994–1995) and Ian Kidd, 13, (1986–1987) and John Noah, 13, (1947–1948)
- Most assists in a season, defenseman: Russ Parent, 50, (1989–1990)
- Most wins in a season: Aaron Dell, 30, (2010–2011)
- Most shutouts in a season: Karl Goehring, 8, (1999–2000)
- Best goals against average in a season: Bob Peters, 1.27, (1957–1958)
- Best save percentage in a season: Jean-Philippe Lamoureux, .932, (2007–2008)

Team

- Most wins in a season: 40 (40–8–0 in 1986–1987)
- Fewest losses in a season: 5 (11–5–0 in 1947–1948 and 15–5–0 in 1952–1953)
- Most home wins in a season: 26 (26–2–0 in 1986–1987)
- Fewest home losses in a season: 0 (14–0–3 in 1962–1963)
- Most road wins in a season: 13 (13–3–3 in 2000–2001 and 13–3–1 in 2015–2016)
- Fewest road losses in a season: 1 (7–1–0 in 1949–1950)
- Most neutral site wins in a season: 8 (8–0–0 in 1999–2000)
- Most overtime games in a season: 15 (2017–2018)
- Most overtime wins in a season: 4 (1980–1981)
- Longest overall unbeaten streak: 16 (2002–2003)
- Most goals in a season: 264 (1986–1987)
- Most assists in a season: 418 (1986–1987)
- Most points in a season: 682 (1986–1987)
- Most power play goals in a season: 71 (1989–1990)
- Best power play percentage in a season: .302 (1977–1978)
- Most shorthanded goals in a season: 18 (1986–1987)
- Best penalty kill percentage in a season: .872 (2003–2004)
- Most shutouts in a season: 9 (1999–2000)

=== Game ===
Player

- Most goals in a game: Bill Sullivan, 8, (vs North Dakota State, 2/27/1948)
- Most assists in a game: Bill Himmelright, 6, (vs Colorado College, 2/19/1977) and Doug Smail, 6, (vs Michigan State 11/5/1977)
- Most points in a game: Bill Reichart, 9, (vs Minnesota-Duluth, 12/29/1954) and Bob Joyce, 9, (vs Michigan Tech 1/2/87)
- Most power play goals in a game: Mark Taylor, 3, (vs Michigan State 11/23/1979) and Jeff McLean, 3, (vs Denver 10/18/1991)
- Most penalty minutes in a game: Landon Wilson, 33, (vs Minnesota Duluth, 1/27/1995)
- Most saves in a game: Darren Jensen, 56, (vs Minnesota, 11/31/1981)

Team

- Most goals in a game: 18 (at Denver, 2/1/1950)
- Most assists in a game: 24 (vs. Yale, 1/1/1960)
- Most points in a game: 39 (vs. Yale, 1/1/1960)
- Most power play goals in a game: 7 (at Denver, 10/18/1991)
- Most shorthanded goals in a game: 3 (vs Michigan Tech, 2/16/1990)
- Most penalty minutes in a game: 124 (vs Minnesota Duluth, 10/31/1998)
- Largest margin of victory: 15 (vs. Yale, 15–0 on 1/1/1960)
- Fastest 2 goals scored in a game: 0:02 (at Colorado College 1/30/1960)
- Fastest 3 goals scored in a game: 0:20 (vs Colorado College 2/11/1953)
- Fastest 4 goals scored in a game: 1:18 (vs University of Saskatchewan 12/30/76)
- Longest game: 142:13 (vs Minnesota Duluth, 2–3 5OT Loss on 3/27/2021)

=== Period ===
Player

- Most goals in a period: Cary Eades, 4, (vs Colorado College 11/14/1980)
- Most points in a period: Milton "Prince" Johnson, 6, (vs Michigan State 2/10/1950)
- Most saves in a period: Dave Murphy, 25, (vs US Olympic Team 11/07/1971)

Team

- Most goals in a period: 11 (vs Manitoba, 12/28/1978)
- Most assists in a period: 18 (vs Manitoba, 12/28/1978)
- Most points in a period: 29 (vs Manitoba, 12/28/1978)
- Most penalty minutes in a period: 70 (vs Minnesota Duluth, 10/31/1998)

=== Streaks ===
Player

- Longest goal scoring streak: Ben Cherski and Gordon Christian, 12 games
- Longest point scoring streak: Steve Johnson, 27 games

Team

- Most consecutive winning seasons: 16 (2002–2003 to present)
- Longest win streak: 15 (1979–1981)
- Longest home win streak: 18 (1979–1980)
- Longest road win streak: 8 (1967–1968)
- Longest conference win streak: 14 (WCHA, 1986–1987)
- Longest unbeaten streak: 16 (13–0–3 in 2002–2003)
- Longest conference unbeaten streak: 19 (18–0–1 in 1998–1999)
- Most consecutive shutouts: 4 (1953–1954 all vs Michigan Tech, 2015–2016 vs Denver, Minnesota-Duluth (2), and Alabama Huntsville)

== See also ==
- North Dakota Fighting Hawks women's ice hockey
