= 1962–63 North Dakota Fighting Sioux men's ice hockey season =

National champion WCHA, co-champion NCAA Tournament, champion
- Conference: T–1st WCHA
- Home ice: Winter Sports Building

Record
- Overall: 22–7–3
- Conference: 11–5–2
- Home: 14–0–3
- Road: 6–7–0
- Neutral: 2–0–0

Coaches and captains
- Head coach: Barry Thorndycraft
- Assistant coaches: Bob Peters
- Captain: Maurice Roberge
- Alternate captain(s): George Goodacre; Dan Storsteen

The 1962–63 North Dakota Fighting Sioux men's ice hockey team represented the University of North Dakota in college ice hockey. In its 3rd year under head coach Barry Thorndycraft the team compiled a 22–7–3 record and reached the NCAA tournament for the third time. The Fighting Sioux defeated Denver 6–5 to win the championship game at the McHugh Forum in Chestnut Hill, Massachusetts.

== Season ==
North Dakota entered the 1962–63 season after finishing 5th in the WCHA for the previous two seasons. Head coach Barry Thorndycraft was in his fourth season leading the program and could now see his first recruiting class lead the team as seniors. The Fighting Sioux got off to a good start with three home wins against non-conference opponents before opening up the WCHA schedule against Michigan State on the road. After solidly winning the first game 11–4 the Spartans repaid the favor by taking game two 5–6. North Dakota returned home for a series against a Canadian junior team where UND utterly dominated then hit the road again and traveled to Duluth to take on the comparatively weak Bulldogs. Despite the disparity in talent Minnesota–Duluth was able to win their first game of the season, holding the Fighting Sioux to a single goal. North Dakota took the second game to prevent the weekend from becoming a disaster and went in with a decent record of 7–2 but only 1–1 in conference.

Their first opponent after the new year was defending national champion Michigan Tech but with the games in Grand Forks UND had the advantage. The Sioux took the first game 4–2 but the Huskies fought back in the second match and battled North Dakota to a 3–3 tie. The three point weekend allowed UND to ahead of Michigan Tech in the standings despite having played two fewer conference games and after sweeping Minnesota in Minneapolis the following weekend North Dakota was within shouting distance of league-leading Denver. After trouncing another junior team in a single home game North Dakota played host to the Pioneers and the North Dakota faithful roared when the home team won both games to take over atop the WCHA standings, leading with a .813 winning percentage in conference.

UND played one more home game against the Winnipeg Maroons before heading out on an arduous road trip. Their first stop was in Houghton the following weekend where Michigan Tech was waiting to exact revenge. The Huskies stifled UND in both games, holding the Fighting Sioux to a single goal over the weekend and comfortably took both matches. Three days later North Dakota found themselves at altitude in Colorado where they played four games in five days against Denver and Colorado College. Denver too was able to pay the Fighting Sioux back with two home wins but CC fell in both games to give UND a good chance at earning a home playoff berth in the WCHA tournament.

With Denver and MTU playing each other the following week all North Dakota had to do was take care of business at home against Minnesota and Michigan and they would be able to lock up home ice in at least the first round. UND barely won the two contests against Minnesota but the two wins allowed them to leapfrog the Golden Gophers and with Denver splitting its series with the Huskies North Dakota could earn the #1 seed with its only series against the league-worst Wolverines. With nothing left to lose Michigan fought back against the Fighting Sioux and tied the first game 2–2 before barely losing the second match 6–5. The mostly good weekend allowed North Dakota to finish 11–5–2 in league play, giving UND a .667 winning percentage which left them in a tie for first with Denver. North Dakota's first title since forming the WCHA allowed them to earn home ice in their first-round series against Michigan Tech but because Denver had more wins (12) North Dakota was only the second seed.

For the second consecutive year the WCHA had altered the playoff format, making the first round a two-game total-goal series instead of a single-elimination match. While goaltender Joe Lech earned the team's only shutout of the season in the first game against the Huskies, UND could only manage 2 goals themselves. The slim margin was built upon swiftly the next night and North Dakota took the series easily with a 6–1 win. Unfortunately, right after the game the team had to travel almost a thousand miles to play Denver the following day. Despite the journey, the Fighting Sioux put up a fight against the Pioneers and sent the game into overtime tied 4–4 but it was Denver who came out on top.

Due to finishing as the WCHA runner-up North Dakota was offered the second western seed and accepted the entry into the 1963 NCAA Tournament, their first appearance since winning the title in 1959. Ordinarily, UND would have played the winner of the ECAC Tournament but because an ongoing disagreement between the NCAA and the Ivy League about post-season participation Harvard declined their invitation. Instead, North Dakota was set to face ECAC runner-up Boston College at their home venue. While the partisan crowd hoped that the Eagles would be able to carry the day North Dakota swiftly dispatched BC, winning the game 8–2, and sending them to the championship against Denver.

The home team had won all five games between the two schools that season but now a neutral venue would decide which team was ultimately the best. North Dakota came out swinging, scoring the first goal less than two minutes into the contest and added two more before eight minutes had elapsed. Denver would score two goals in quick succession to cut the lead to 1 but within the span of 54 seconds UND added two for to regain a 3-goal lead. UND had outshot Denver 15–7 in the first and they continued to keep the pressure on Rudy Unis into the second, firing another 15 shots at the DU netminder. Al McLean scored just after the 5-minute mark to put his team up 6–2 but Denver started to slowly claw back with two goals to cut the lead in half before the end of the period. In the third North Dakota's offense pulled back slightly but in closing their ranks they were able to limit Denver to only 2 shots on goal. Even so, Denver's Bob Hamill was able to get his third goal of the night with more than six minutes remaining but that was all Denver could muster in the final frame and UND skated away with their second national title, ending Denver's NCAA tournament winning streak at 7 games.

The five goals scored by UND in the first tied the record held by the 1961 Denver team for the most in the opening period while the seven total goals also tied for the most. While he did win the game, with Joe Lech's less-than-stellar championship game (5 goals allowed on 17 shots) it wasn't much of a surprise that he didn't make either All-Tournament team but five of his teammates were named to the first team: George Goodacre, Don Ross, Al McLean, Dave Merrifield and Don Stokaluk. Team captain Maurice Roberge was also named to the second team. McLean, having scored twice including the game-winner, was named as tournament MOP.

After the season McLean, Merrifield and Ross were named as AHCA All-Americans while Merrifeld and Ross made the All-WCHA First Team. Lech and McLean were named to the WCHA Second Team while Barry Thordycraft won the WCHA Coach of the Year

== Standings ==
1962–63 Western Collegiate Hockey Association standings
| | Conference | | | | | | | Overall | | | | | |
| | GP | W | L | T | PCT | GF | GA | GP | W | L | T | GF | GA |
|---|---|---|---|---|---|---|---|---|---|---|---|---|---|
| Denver†* | 18 | 12 | 6 | 0 | .667 | 77 | 54 | 33 | 23 | 9 | 1 | 156 | 102 |
| North Dakota† | 18 | 11 | 5 | 2 | .667 | 76 | 62 | 32 | 22 | 7 | 3 | 162 | 91 |
| Michigan Tech | 20 | 11 | 7 | 2 | .600 | 68 | 53 | 29 | 17 | 10 | 2 | 109 | 76 |
| Minnesota | 20 | 10 | 7 | 3 | .575 | 87 | 67 | 29 | 16 | 9 | 4 | 128 | 84 |
| Colorado College | 16 | 6 | 10 | 0 | .375 | 70 | 91 | 23 | 12 | 11 | 0 | 113 | 125 |
| Michigan State | 16 | 6 | 10 | 0 | .375 | 60 | 90 | 23 | 11 | 12 | 0 | 90 | 108 |
| Michigan | 20 | 3 | 14 | 3 | .225 | 62 | 89 | 24 | 7 | 14 | 3 | 98 | 96 |
Championship: Denver † indicates conference regular season champion * indicates conference tournament champion

== Schedule ==
| Date | Opponent^{#} | Rank^{#} | Site | Result | Record |
Regular Season
| November 24 | vs. Winnipeg Monarchs* | | Winter Sports Building • Grand Forks, North Dakota | W 7–2 | 1–0 |
| November 30 | vs. Minnesota–Duluth* | | Winter Sports Building • Grand Forks, North Dakota | W 4–1 | 2–0 |
| December 1 | vs. Minnesota–Duluth* | | Winter Sports Building • Grand Forks, North Dakota | W 7–1 | 3–0 |
| December 7 | at Michigan State | | Demonstration Hall • East Lansing, Michigan | W 11–4 | 4–0 (1–0) |
| December 8 | at Michigan State | | Demonstration Hall • East Lansing, Michigan | L 5–6 | 4–1 (1–1) |
| December 14 | vs. Winnipeg Rangers* | | Winter Sports Building • Grand Forks, North Dakota | W 12–1 | 5–1 (1–1) |
| December 15 | vs. Winnipeg Rangers* | | Winter Sports Building • Grand Forks, North Dakota | W 10–1 | 6–1 (1–1) |
| December 18 | at Minnesota–Duluth* | | Duluth Curling and Skating Club • Duluth, Minnesota | L 1–4 | 6–2 (1–1) |
| December 19 | at Minnesota–Duluth* | | Duluth Curling and Skating Club • Duluth, Minnesota | W 7–3 | 7–2 (1–1) |
| January 4 | vs. Michigan Tech | | Winter Sports Building • Grand Forks, North Dakota | W 4–2 | 8–2 (2–1) |
| January 5 | vs. Michigan Tech | | Winter Sports Building • Grand Forks, North Dakota | T 3–3 ^{OT} | 8–2–1 (2–1–1) |
| January 11 | at Minnesota | | Williams Arena • Minneapolis, Minnesota | W 6–4 | 9–2–1 (3–1–1) |
| January 12 | at Minnesota | | Williams Arena • Minneapolis, Minnesota | W 3–2 | 10–2–1 (4–1–1) |
| January 17 | vs. St. Boniface Canadiens* | | Winter Sports Building • Grand Forks, North Dakota | W 10–2 | 11–2–1 (4–1–1) |
| January 25 | vs. Denver | | Winter Sports Building • Grand Forks, North Dakota | W 7–4 | 12–2–1 (5–1–1) |
| January 26 | vs. Denver | | Winter Sports Building • Grand Forks, North Dakota | W 3–1 | 13–2–1 (6–1–1) |
| February 2 | vs. Winnipeg Maroons* | | Winter Sports Building • Grand Forks, North Dakota | T 2–2 ^{OT} | 13–2–2 (6–1–1) |
| February 8 | at Michigan Tech | | Dee Stadium • Houghton, Michigan | L 0–3 | 13–3–2 (6–2–1) |
| February 9 | at Michigan Tech | | Dee Stadium • Houghton, Michigan | L 1–5 | 13–4–2 (6–3–1) |
| February 12 | at Denver | | DU Arena • Denver, Colorado | L 1–3 | 13–5–2 (6–4–1) |
| February 13 | at Colorado College | | Broadmoor World Arena • Colorado Springs, Colorado | W 7–1 | 14–5–2 (7–4–1) |
| February 15 | at Denver | | DU Arena • Denver, Colorado | L 2–3 | 14–6–2 (7–5–1) |
| February 16 | at Colorado College | | Broadmoor World Arena • Colorado Springs, Colorado | W 7–6 | 15–6–2 (8–5–1) |
| February 22 | vs. Minnesota | | Winter Sports Building • Grand Forks, North Dakota | W 4–3 | 16–6–2 (9–5–1) |
| February 23 | vs. Minnesota | | Winter Sports Building • Grand Forks, North Dakota | W 4–3 | 17–6–2 (10–5–1) |
| March 1 | vs. Michigan | | Winter Sports Building • Grand Forks, North Dakota | T 2–2 | 17–6–3 (10–5–2) |
| March 2 | vs. Michigan | | Winter Sports Building • Grand Forks, North Dakota | W 6–5 | 18–6–3 (11–5–2) |
WCHA Tournament
| March 7 | vs. Michigan Tech* | | Winter Sports Building • Grand Forks, North Dakota (WCHA Semifinal game 1) | W 2–0 | 19–6–3 (11–5–2) |
| March 8 | vs. Michigan Tech* | | Winter Sports Building • Grand Forks, North Dakota (WCHA Semifinal game 2) | W 6–1 | 20–6–3 (11–5–2) |
| March 9 | vs. Denver* | | DU Arena • Denver, Colorado (WCHA championship) | L 4–5 ^{OT} | 20–7–3 (11–5–2) |
NCAA Tournament
| March 14 | vs. Boston College* | | McHugh Forum • Chestnut Hill, Massachusetts (National Semifinal) | W 8–2 | 21–7–3 (11–5–2) |
| March 16 | vs. Denver* | | McHugh Forum • Chestnut Hill, Massachusetts (National championship) | W 6–5 | 22–7–3 (11–5–2) |
*Non-conference game. ^{#}Rankings from USCHO.com Poll. Source:

== Roster and scoring statistics ==
| No. | Name | Year | Position | Hometown | S/P/C | Games | Goals | Assists | Pts | PIM |
|---|---|---|---|---|---|---|---|---|---|---|
| 7 | Al McLean | Junior | F | New Westminster, BC | (British Columbia) | 32 | 19 | 34 | 53 | 53 |
| 8 | Dave Merrifield | Senior | C | Thunder Bay, ON | (Ontario) | 32 | 21 | 30 | 51 | 28 |
| 21 | George Chigol | Junior | W | Flin Flon, MB | (Manitoba) | 32 | 16 | 19 | 35 | 21 |
| 17 | Wayne Gurba | Sophomore | F | Flin Flon, MB | (Manitoba) | 32 | 20 | 14 | 34 | 4 |
| 14 | Ernie Dyda | Senior | C | Norquay, SK | (Saskatchewan) | 32 | 14 | 20 | 34 | 4 |
| 6 | Don Ross | Senior | D/C | Roseau, MN | (Minnesota) | 32 | 15 | 15 | 30 | 16 |
| 2 | George Goodacre | Senior | D | Red Deer, AB | (Alberta) | 32 | 3 | 14 | 17 | 48 |
| 18 | Don Stokaluk | Junior | W | Thunder Bay, ON | (Ontario) | 32 | 11 | 5 | 16 | 13 |
| 10 | Jack Matheson | Junior | RW | Brandon, MB | (Manitoba) | 29 | 8 | 8 | 16 | 34 |
| 12 | Will Stirrett | Sophomore | W | Thunder Bay, ON | (Ontario) | 27 | 8 | 4 | 12 | 12 |
| 5 | John Sutherland | Junior | D | Winnipeg, MB | (Manitoba) | 32 | 3 | 8 | 11 | 36 |
| 3 | Bill Selman | Senior | D | Fort Frances, ON | (Ontario) | 26 | 0 | 9 | 9 | 6 |
| 4 | Maurice Roberge | Junior | D | Edmonton, AB | (Alberta) | 30 | 1 | 6 | 7 | 26 |
| 9 | Pete Stasiuk | Senior | W | Lethbridge, AB | (Alberta) | 32 | 4 | 2 | 6 | 8 |
| 20 | Bill Borlase | Junior | D | Fort Frances, ON | (Ontario) | 9 | 1 | 0 | 1 | 2 |
| 13 | Arnold Steeves | Sophomore | W | Marathon, ON | (Ontario) | 5 | 0 | 1 | 1 | 2 |
| 11 | Dan Storsteen | Senior | W | Devils Lake, ND | (North Dakota) | 0 | 0 | 0 | 0 | 0 |
| 1 | Joe Lech | Sophomore | G | Glenbain, SK | (Saskatchewan) | – | – | – | – | – |
| 1 | Dudley Otto | Senior | G | South St. Paul, MN | (Minnesota) | – | – | – | – | – |
| 1 | George Baland | Junior | G | Virginia, MN | (Minnesota) | – | – | – | – | – |
| Total | | | | | | | | | | |

== Goaltending statistics ==
| No. | Name | Games | Minutes | Wins | Losses | Ties | Goals Against | Saves | Shut Outs | SV % | GAA |
|---|---|---|---|---|---|---|---|---|---|---|---|
| 1 | George Baland | – | – | – | – | – | – | – | 0 | .910 | 1.00 |
| 1 | Joe Lech | – | – | – | – | – | – | – | 1 | .887 | 2.60 |
| 1 | Dudley Otto | – | – | – | – | – | – | – | 0 | .870 | 2.75 |
| Total | | 32 | – | – | – | – | – | – | – | – | – |

== 1963 championship game ==
=== W1 Denver vs. W2 North Dakota ===
| March 16 | North Dakota | 6 – 5 | Denver | McHugh Forum |

Scoring summary
| Period | Team | Goal | Assist(s) | Time | Score |
|---|---|---|---|---|---|
| 1st | UND | Don Stokaluk | Merrifield and Bartlett | 1:57 | 1–0 UND |
| 1st | UND | Al McLean | Sutherland and Bartlett | 3:11 | 2–0 UND |
| 1st | UND | Ernie Dyda | Matheson and Merrifield | 7:25 | 3–0 UND |
| 1st | DEN | Greg Lacomy | Kenning and Fragomeni | 12:55 | 3–1 UND |
| 1st | DEN | Bob Hamill | Wilson and Art | 13:13 | 3–2 UND |
| 1st | UND | Don Stokaluk | Roberge | 14:20 | 4–2 UND |
| 1st | UND | Jack Matheson | Ross | 15:14 | 5–2 UND |
| 2nd | UND | Al McLean – GW | unassisted | 25:01 | 6–2 UND |
| 2nd | DEN | Greg Lacomy | Wilson and Johnston | 27:05 | 6–3 UND |
| 2nd | DEN | Bob Hamill | Staub | 33:09 | 6–4 UND |
| 3rd | DEN | Bob Hamill | Kowel | 53:19 | 6–5 UND |

Shots by period
| Team | 1 | 2 | 3 | T |
|---|---|---|---|---|
| North Dakota | 15 | 15 | 9 | 39 |
| Denver | 7 | 8 | 2 | 17 |

Goaltenders
| Team | Name | Saves | Goals against | Time on ice |
|---|---|---|---|---|
| UND | Joe Lech | 12 | 5 | |
| DEN | Rudy Unis | 33 | 6 | |

== See also ==
- 1963 NCAA Division I Men's Ice Hockey Tournament
- List of NCAA Division I Men's Ice Hockey Tournament champions
