= 1962–63 NCAA men's ice hockey season =

- Duration: November 1962– March 16, 1963
- NCAA tournament: 1963
- National championship: McHugh Forum; Chestnut Hill, Massachusetts
- NCAA champion: North Dakota

The 1962–63 NCAA men's ice hockey season began in November 1962 and concluded with the 1963 NCAA Division I Men's Ice Hockey Tournament's championship game on March 16, 1963 at the McHugh Forum in Chestnut Hill, Massachusetts. This was the 16th season in which an NCAA ice hockey championship was held and is the 69th year overall where an NCAA school fielded a team.

== Regular season ==
=== Season tournaments ===
Tournament	Dates	Teams	Champion
ECAC Holiday Hockey Festival	December 20–21	4	Boston College
Brown Holiday Tournament	December 20–22	8	Brown
Boston Arena Christmas Tournament	December 26–28	4	Harvard
Rensselaer Holiday Tournament	December 27–29	4	Minnesota
Beanpot	February 4, 11	4	Boston College

=== Standings ===
1962–63 Big Ten standings
	Conference							Overall					
	GP	W	L	T	PTS	GF	GA	GP	W	L	T	GF	GA
Minnesota†	8	5	1	2	12	43	27	29	16	9	4	128	84
Michigan State	8	5	3	0	10	26	30	23	11	12	0	90	108
Michigan	8	0	6	2	2	22	34	24	7	14	3	98	96
† indicates conference regular season champion

1962–63 ECAC Hockey standings
	Conference							Overall					
	GP	W	L	T	Pct.	GF	GA	GP	W	L	T	GF	GA
Harvard†*	22	17	3	2	.818	113	51	26	21	3	2	134	62
Clarkson	15	11	2	2	.800	72	33	28	21	5	2	155	73
Boston College	24	19	5	0	.792	113	49	31	22	9	0	144	79
St. Lawrence	16	12	3	1	.781	69	32	27	20	6	1	129	72
Providence	19	13	4	2	.737	101	51	23	13	8	2	110	68
Army	18	12	4	2	.722	74	42	25	17	6	2	120	57
Colgate	16	11	4	1	.719	78	30	22	16	5	1	131	42
Brown	22	15	6	1	.705	109	63	24	16	7	1	114	68
Williams	21	12	9	0	.571	112	78	22	13	9	0	121	82
Norwich	22	12	9	1	.568	140	104	22	12	9	1	140	104
Yale	20	11	9	0	.550	87	86	22	12	9	1	102	97
Connecticut	4	2	2	0	.500	17	24	7	4	3	0	26	34
New Hampshire	19	9	10	0	.474	101	80	20	10	10	0	109	87
Cornell	17	8	9	0	.471	55	68	19	9	9	1	69	71
Massachusetts	15	7	8	0	.467	50	77	16	7	9	0	51	79
Rensselaer	14	6	7	1	.464	66	51	23	10	12	1	133	100
Merrimack	12	5	7	0	.417	45	63	13	6	7	0	53	63
Middlebury	17	7	10	0	.412	79	87	22	10	12	0	104	109
Dartmouth	20	8	12	0	.400	87	87	20	8	12	0	87	87
Northeastern	25	9	16	0	.360	115	140	26	9	17	0	118	145
Colby	17	6	11	0	.353	58	89	21	7	14	0	72	103
Boston University	22	7	15	0	.318	75	90	23	7	16	0	87	101
Bowdoin	18	5	13	0	.278	92	91	19	6	13	0	101	92
American International	15	4	11	0	.267	53	119	18	7	11	0	93	125
Princeton	21	5	16	0	.238	58	118	23	6	17	0	94	124
Hamilton	16	2	13	1	.156	21	100	17	2	14	1	25	105
Amherst	15	2	13	0	.133	28	111	18	4	14	0	34	118
MIT	8	1	7	0	.125	10	65	13	2	10	1	31	96
Championship: Harvard † indicates conference regular season champion * indicates conference tournament champion

1962–63 NCAA Independent ice hockey standings
	Overall					
	GP	W	L	T	GF	GA
Minnesota–Duluth	24	7	15	2	80	103
St. Olaf	11	4	7	0	–	–

1962–63 Minnesota Intercollegiate Athletic Conference ice hockey standings
	Conference							Overall					
	GP	W	L	T	PTS	GF	GA	GP	W	L	T	GF	GA
Macalester †	–	–	–	–	–	–	–	–	–	–	–	–	–
Augsburg	14	9	5	0	.643	–	–	18	12	6	0	–	–
Concordia	–	–	–	–	–	–	–	14	2	12	0	–	–
Gustavus Adolphus	–	–	–	–	–	–	–	19	3	16	0	–	–
Hamline	–	–	–	–	–	–	–	–	–	–	–	–	–
Saint John's	–	–	–	–	–	–	–	16	6	10	0	–	–
Saint Mary's	–	–	–	–	–	–	–	17	12	4	1	–	–
St. Thomas	–	–	–	–	–	–	–	16	11	4	1	–	–
† indicates conference champion

1962–63 Tri-State League standings
	Conference							Overall					
	GP	W	L	T	PTS	GF	GA	GP	W	L	T	GF	GA
St. Lawrence†	4	3	0	1	7	14	7	27	20	6	1	129	72
Clarkson	4	2	1	1	5	19	13	28	21	5	2	155	73
Rensselaer	4	0	4	0	0	9	22	23	10	12	1	133	100
† indicates conference regular season champion

1962–63 Western Collegiate Hockey Association standings
	Conference							Overall					
	GP	W	L	T	PCT	GF	GA	GP	W	L	T	GF	GA
Denver†*	18	12	6	0	.667	77	54	33	23	9	1	156	102
North Dakota†	18	11	5	2	.667	76	62	32	22	7	3	162	91
Michigan Tech	20	11	7	2	.600	68	53	29	17	10	2	109	76
Minnesota	20	10	7	3	.575	87	67	29	16	9	4	128	84
Colorado College	16	6	10	0	.375	70	91	23	12	11	0	113	125
Michigan State	16	6	10	0	.375	60	90	23	11	12	0	90	108
Michigan	20	3	14	3	.225	62	89	24	7	14	3	98	96
Championship: Denver † indicates conference regular season champion * indicates conference tournament champion

== 1963 NCAA Tournament ==
Semifinals; March 14–15
E1	Boston College	2
W2	North Dakota	8
W1	Denver	6
E2	Clarkson	2

National championship March 16
W2	North Dakota	6
W1	Denver	5
Third-place game
E1	Boston College	3
E2	Clarkson	5

Note: * denotes overtime period(s)

== Player stats ==
=== Scoring leaders ===
The following players led the league in points at the conclusion of the season.

GP = Games played; G = Goals; A = Assists; Pts = Points; PIM = Penalty minutes

Player	Class	Team	GP	G	A	Pts	PIM
Tom Roe	Senior	Williams	21	45	33	78	-
Bob Brinkworth	Junior	Rensselaer	23	34	41	75	8
Leo Dupere	Junior	Northeastern	24	33	34	67	-
Jerry Knightley	Sophomore	Rensselaer	23	30	33	63	32
Bill Hogan	Senior	Boston College	–	19	40	59	-
Corby Adams	Junior	Clarkson	26	26	30	56	25
Al McLean	Junior	North Dakota	32	19	34	53	53
Dave Merrifield	Senior	North Dakota	32	21	30	51	28
John Cook	Senior	Princeton	–	26	23	49	–
Ken Astill	Senior	Rensselaer	23	22	27	49	13

=== Leading goaltenders ===
The following goaltenders led the league in goals against average at the end of the regular season while playing at least 33% of their team's total minutes.

GP = Games played; Min = Minutes played; W = Wins; L = Losses; OT = Overtime/shootout losses; GA = Goals against; SO = Shutouts; SV% = Save percentage; GAA = Goals against average

Player	Class	Team	GP	Min	W	L	OT	GA	SO	SV%	GAA
George Baland	Junior	North Dakota	-	-	-	-	-	-	0	.910	1.00
Kurt Brown	Sophomore	Colgate	-	-	17	-	-	-	4	.930	1.83
Tom Haugh	Junior	Providence	18	-	-	-	-	-	-	.910	1.93
Godfrey Wood	Senior	Harvard	24	-	-	-	-	-	-	.911	2.21
Jack Shepard	Senior	Army	22	1216	13	5	2	46	1	.920	2.27
Richie Broadbelt	Senior	St. Lawrence	26	1526	-	-	-	62	4	.925	2.44
Joe Lech	Sophomore	North Dakota	-	-	-	-	-	-	1	.887	2.60
Garry Bauman	Junior	Michigan Tech	26	-	-	-	-	-	-	.915	2.69
Dudley Otto	Senior	North Dakota	-	-	-	-	-	-	0	.870	2.75
Roger Groth	Sophomore	Minnesota	26	-	-	-	-	-	-	.894	2.92

== Awards ==
=== NCAA ===
Award		Recipient
Spencer Penrose Award		Tony Frasca, Colorado College
Most Outstanding Player in NCAA Tournament		Al McLean, North Dakota
AHCA All-American Teams
East Team	Position	West Team
Richie Broadbelt, St. Lawrence	G	Garry Bauman, Michigan Tech
Pat Brophy, Clarkson	D	Lou Nanne, Minnesota
David Johnston, Harvard	D	Don Ross, North Dakota
Cal Wagner, Clarkson	D	
Bob Brinkworth, Rensselaer	F	George Hill, Michigan Tech
Jack Leetch, Boston College	F	Al McLean, North Dakota
Dates Fryberger, Middlebury	F	Dave Merrifield, North Dakota
	F	Bill Staub, Denver

=== WCHA ===
Award		Recipient
Most Valuable Player		Lou Nanne, Minnesota
Sophomore of the Year		George Hill, Michigan Tech
Coach of the Year		Barry Thorndycraft, North Dakota
All-WCHA Teams
First Team	Position	Second Team
Garry Bauman, Michigan Tech	G	Joe Lech, North Dakota
Lou Nanne, Minnesota	D	Gary Begg, Michigan Tech
Don Ross, North Dakota	D	Jack Wilson, Denver
Bill Staub, Denver	F	Dominic Fragomeni, Denver
Dave Merrifield, North Dakota	F	John Ivanitz, Michigan Tech
Gary Butler, Michigan	F	Al McLean, North Dakota
George Hill, Michigan Tech	F	

=== ECAC ===
Award		Recipient
Player of the Year		Bob Brinkworth, Rensselaer
Rookie of the Year		Richie Green, Boston University
Outstanding Defenseman		David Johnston, Harvard
Most Outstanding Player in Tournament		Gene Kinasewich, Harvard
All-ECAC Hockey Teams
First Team	Position	Second Team
Richie Broadbelt, St. Lawrence	G	Godfrey Wood, Harvard
Tom Apprille, Boston College	G	Laing Kennedy, Cornell
David Johnston, Harvard	D	Richie Green, Boston University
Cal Wagner, Clarkson	D	John Weekes, Middlebury
Pat Brophy, Clarkson	D	Brian Pryce, Rensselaer
Jack Callahan, Boston College	D	Harry Howell, Harvard
Larry Kish, Providence	D	
Jack Leetch, Boston College	F	Leon Bryant, Brown
Bob Brinkworth, Rensselaer	F	Ike Ikauniks, Harvard
Bill Hogan, Boston College	F	John Cook, Princeton
Dates Fryberger, Middlebury	F	Lou Lamoriello, Providence
Leo Dupere, Northeastern	F	Roger Purdie, Clarkson
Corby Adams, Clarkson	F	Bill Lamarche, Harvard
Ron Mason, St. Lawrence	F	Jerry Knightley, Rensselaer
Tom Roe, Williams	F	Mike Denihan, Boston University
Gene Kinasewich, Harvard	F	Brian Wilkinson, Clarkson
Tim Taylor, Harvard	F	Steve Riggs, Colgate

== Drafted players ==
Round	Pick	Player	College	Conference	NHL team
3	14	Roger Bamburak ^{†}	North Dakota	WCHA	Boston Bruins

† incoming freshman
