= 1963 NCAA men's ice hockey tournament =

College ice hockey tournament

- Teams: 4
- Finals site: McHugh Forum, Chestnut Hill, Massachusetts
- Champions: North Dakota Fighting Sioux (2nd title)
- Runner-up: Denver Pioneers (4th title game)
- Semifinalists: Clarkson Golden Knights (4th Frozen Four); Boston College Eagles (7th Frozen Four)
- Winning coach: Barry Thorndycraft (2nd title)
- MOP: Al McLean (North Dakota)
- Attendance: 16,190

The 1963 NCAA Men's Ice Hockey Tournament was the culmination of the 1962–63 NCAA men's ice hockey season, the 16th such tournament in NCAA history. It was held between March 14 and 16, 1963, and concluded with North Dakota defeating Denver 6–5. All games were played at the McHugh Forum in Chestnut Hill, Massachusetts.

== Qualifying teams ==
Four teams qualified for the tournament, two each from the eastern and western regions. The ECAC tournament champion and the WCHA tournament champion received automatic bids into the tournament. Harvard, the ECAC champion, declined the bid to the tournament and was instead replaced by the runner-up Boston College. Two at-large bids were offered to one eastern and one western team based upon both their tournament finish as well as their regular season record.

East							West						
Seed	School	Conference	Record	Berth type	Appearance	Last bid	Seed	School	Conference	Record	Berth type	Appearance	Last bid
1	Boston College	ECAC Hockey	22–7–0	At-Large	7th	1959	1	Denver	WCHA	22–8–1	Tournament champion	4th	1961
2	Clarkson	ECAC Hockey	19–3–2	At-Large	4th	1962	2	North Dakota	WCHA	20–7–3	At-Large	3rd	1959

== Format ==
The ECAC champion was seeded as the top eastern team while the WCHA champion was given the top western seed. The second eastern seed was slotted to play the top western seed and vice versa. All games were played at the Meehan Auditorium. All matches were Single-game eliminations with the semifinal winners advancing to the national championship game and the losers playing in a consolation game.

== Bracket ==
Semifinals; March 14–15
E1	Boston College	2
W2	North Dakota	8
W1	Denver	6
E2	Clarkson	2

National championship March 16
W2	North Dakota	6
W1	Denver	5
Third-place game
E1	Boston College	3
E2	Clarkson	5

Note: * denotes overtime period(s)

=== Semifinals ===
==== Boston College vs. North Dakota ====
March 14	Boston College	2 – 8	North Dakota	McHugh Forum	Recap
(Callahan) E.J. Breen - PP - 16:46		First period	06:42 - Dave Merrifield (Ross); 09:29 - John Sutherland (Matheson, Storsteen); 13:53 - GW - Al McLean (Bartlett, Sutherland)
(Lufkin, Hogan) Jack Leetch - PP - 00:54		Second period	05:31 - Don Stokaluk (Ross, McLean); 14:46 - SH - Peter Stasiuk (unassisted)
No scoring		Third period	05:13 - SH - Ernie Dyda (Goodacre); 09:45 - SH - Peter Stasiuk (unassisted); 12:24 - Don Stokaluk (McLean, Selman)
(41 saves) Tom Apprille (4 saves) Rollie Laroche		Goalie stats	Joe Lech (18 saves)

==== Denver vs. Clarkson ====
March 15	Denver	6 – 2	Clarkson	McHugh Forum	Recap
(Dowhan, Livingston) Bob Lindsay - 04:12		First period	No scoring
(Hamill) Jon Art - 03:26 (Lacomy) Dominic Fragomeni - GW - 03:26 (Hamill, Art) Bill Staub - 10:11 (Staub, Art) Jim Kenning - 17:58		Second period	19:38 - Corby Adams (unassisted)
(Lacomy, Fragomeni) Marshall Johnston - 06:52		Third period	05:44 - Gary Bray (Adams, LaPointe)
(26 saves) Rudy Unis		Goalie stats	Wayne Gibbons (36 saves); Bob Birrell (4 saves)

=== Consolation Game ===
==== Boston College vs. Clarkson ====
March 16	Boston College	3 – 5	Clarkson	McHugh Forum	Recap
No scoring		First period	11:49 - Corby Adams (Wilkinson, Purdie)
(Hogan, Callahan) Fran Kerns - 05:34 (Toran) Billy Hogan - 14:14		Second period	04:21 - Arnie Lawlor (unassisted); 04:55 - Gary Bray (Lawlor, LaPointe); 07:02 - GW - Corby Adams (Purdie)
(Downes, Flaherty) E.J. Breen - 03:47		Third period	14:49 - Roger Purdie (Adams)
(37 saves) Tom Apprille		Goalie stats	Wayne Gibbons (27 saves)

=== National Championship ===
==== Denver vs. North Dakota ====
March 16	Denver	5 – 6	North Dakota	McHugh Forum

Scoring summary
Period	Team	Goal	Assist(s)	Time	Score
1st	UND	Don Stokaluk	Merrifield and Bartlett	1:57	1–0 UND
1st	UND	Al McLean	Sutherland and Bartlett	3:11	2–0 UND
1st	UND	Ernie Dyda – SH	Matheson and Merrifield	7:25	3–0 UND
1st	DEN	Greg Lacomy	Kenning and Fragomeni	12:55	3–1 UND
1st	DEN	Bob Hamill	Wilson and Art	13:13	3–2 UND
1st	UND	Don Stokaluk	Roberge	14:20	4–2 UND
1st	UND	Jack Matheson	Ross	15:14	5–2 UND
2nd	UND	Al McLean – GW PP	unassisted	25:01	6–2 UND
2nd	DEN	Greg Lacomy – PP	Wilson and Johnston	27:05	6–3 UND
2nd	DEN	Bob Hamill – PP	Staub	33:09	6–4 UND
3rd	DEN	Bob Hamill	Kowel	53:19	6–5 UND
Penalty summary
Period	Team	Player	Penalty	Time	PIM
1st	UND	George Goodacre	Cross-checking	6:17	2:00
2nd	DEN	Greg Lacomy	Holding	23:15	2:00
2nd	UND	Maurice Roberge	Holding	25:17	2:00
2nd	UND	Jack Matheson	Tripping	30:10	2:00
2nd	UND	Jack Matheson	Tripping	32:25	2:00
3rd	DEN	Marshall Johnson	Tripping	43:11	2:00
3rd	UND	Bob Bartlett	Holding	44:51	2:00
3rd	DEN	Doug Kowel	Interference	46:19	2:00

Shots by period
Team	1	2	3	T
North Dakota	15	15	9	39
Denver	7	8	2	17

Goaltenders
Team	Name	Saves	Goals against	Time on ice
UND	Joe Lech	12	5	
DEN	Rudy Unis	33	6	

== All-Tournament team ==
=== First Team ===
- G: Tom Apprille (Boston College)
- D: George Goodacre (North Dakota)
- D: Don Ross (North Dakota)
- F: Al McLean* (North Dakota)
- F: Dave Merrifield (North Dakota)
- F: Don Stokaluk (North Dakota)

* Most Outstanding Player(s)

=== Second Team ===
- G: Wayne Gibbons (Clarkson)
- D: Jim Kenning (Denver)
- D: Maurice Roberge (North Dakota)
- F: Jack Leetch (Boston College)
- F: Corby Adams (Clarkson)
- F: Bob Hamill (Denver)
