= 1963 WCHA men's ice hockey tournament =

Ice hockey tournament

1963 WCHA Men's ice hockey tournament
- Dates: March 7–9, 1963
- Teams: 4
- Finals site: DU Arena; Denver, Colorado
- Champions: Denver (3rd title)
- Winning coach: Murray Armstrong (3rd title)
- WCHA Men's Ice Hockey Tournaments

The 1963 WCHA Men's Ice Hockey Tournament was the 4th conference playoff in league history. The tournament was played between March 7 and March 9, 1963. All games were played at home team campus sites. By reaching the title game both Denver and North Dakota were invited to participate in the 1963 NCAA Men's Ice Hockey Tournament.

== Format ==
The top four teams in the WCHA, based upon the conference regular season standings, were eligible for the tournament and were seeded No. 1 through No. 4. In the first round the first and fourth seeds and the second and third seeds were matched in two-game series where the school that scored the higher number of goals was declared the winner. The winners advanced to the title game which was to be played at the higher remaining seed's home venue.

=== Conference standings ===
Note: GP = Games played; W = Wins; L = Losses; T = Ties; PCT = Winning percentage; GF = Goals for; GA = Goals against

1962–63 Western Collegiate Hockey Association standings
	Conference							Overall					
	GP	W	L	T	PCT	GF	GA	GP	W	L	T	GF	GA
Denver†*	18	12	6	0	.667	77	54	33	23	9	1	156	102
North Dakota†	18	11	5	2	.667	76	62	32	22	7	3	162	91
Michigan Tech	20	11	7	2	.600	68	53	29	17	10	2	109	76
Minnesota	20	10	7	3	.575	87	67	29	16	9	4	128	84
Colorado College	16	6	10	0	.375	70	91	23	12	11	0	113	125
Michigan State	16	6	10	0	.375	60	90	23	11	12	0	90	108
Michigan	20	3	14	3	.225	62	89	24	7	14	3	98	96
Championship: Denver † indicates conference regular season champion * indicates conference tournament champion

== Bracket ==
First Round; March 7–8
1	Denver	3	6	9
4	Minnesota	0	2	2
2	North Dakota	2	6	8
3	Michigan Tech	0	1	1

Final; March 9
1	Denver (OT)	5
2	North Dakota	4

=== First round ===
==== (1) Denver vs. (4) Minnesota ====
March 7	Denver	3 – 0	Minnesota	DU Arena

March 8	Denver	6 – 2	Minnesota	DU Arena

Denver won series 9–2

==== (2) North Dakota vs. (3) Michigan Tech ====
March 7	North Dakota	2 – 0	Michigan Tech	Winter Sports Building

March 8	North Dakota	6 – 1	Michigan Tech	Winter Sports Building

North Dakota won series 8–1

=== Final ===
==== (1) Denver vs. (2) North Dakota ====
March 9	Denver	5 – 4	OT	North Dakota	DU Arena

== Tournament awards ==
None

== See also ==
- Western Collegiate Hockey Association men's champions
