= 1963 ECAC Hockey men's ice hockey tournament =

1963 ECAC Men's ice hockey tournament
- Dates: March 5–9, 1963
- Teams: 8
- Finals site: Boston Arena; Boston, Massachusetts
- Champions: Harvard (1st title)
- Winning coach: Cooney Weiland (1st title)
- MVP: Gene Kinasewich (Harvard)
- ECAC Men's Ice Hockey Tournaments

The 1963 ECAC Hockey Men's Ice Hockey Tournament was the 2nd tournament in league history. It was played between March 5 and March 9, 1963. Quarterfinal games were played at home team campus sites, while the 'final four' games were played at the Boston Arena in Boston, Massachusetts. By reaching the championship game both Harvard and Boston College received invitations to participate in the 1963 NCAA Men's Ice Hockey Tournament. Harvard, however, declined the invitation and was replaced by Clarkson who won the third place game. This is the only time that the winner of the ECAC tournament has not made an appearance in the NCAA tournament. (as of 2014)

== Format ==
The tournament featured three rounds of play, all of which were single-elimination. The top eight teams, based on conference rankings, qualified to participate in the tournament. In the quarterfinals the first seed and eighth seed, the second seed and seventh seed, the third seed and sixth seed and the fourth seed and fifth seed played against one another. In the semifinals, the winner of the first and eighth matchup played the winner of the fourth and fifth matchup while the other two remaining teams played with the winners advancing to the championship game and the losers advancing to the third place game.

== Conference standings ==
Note: GP = Games played; W = Wins; L = Losses; T = Ties; Pct. = Winning percentage; GF = Goals for; GA = Goals against

1962–63 ECAC Hockey standings
	Conference							Overall					
	GP	W	L	T	Pct.	GF	GA	GP	W	L	T	GF	GA
Harvard†*	22	17	3	2	.818	113	51	26	21	3	2	134	62
Clarkson	15	11	2	2	.800	72	33	28	21	5	2	155	73
Boston College	24	19	5	0	.792	113	49	31	22	9	0	144	79
St. Lawrence	16	12	3	1	.781	69	32	27	20	6	1	129	72
Providence	19	13	4	2	.737	101	51	23	13	8	2	110	68
Army	18	12	4	2	.722	74	42	25	17	6	2	120	57
Colgate	16	11	4	1	.719	78	30	22	16	5	1	131	42
Brown	22	15	6	1	.705	109	63	24	16	7	1	114	68
Williams	21	12	9	0	.571	112	78	22	13	9	0	121	82
Norwich	22	12	9	1	.568	140	104	22	12	9	1	140	104
Yale	20	11	9	0	.550	87	86	22	12	9	1	102	97
Connecticut	4	2	2	0	.500	17	24	7	4	3	0	26	34
New Hampshire	19	9	10	0	.474	101	80	20	10	10	0	109	87
Cornell	17	8	9	0	.471	55	68	19	9	9	1	69	71
Massachusetts	15	7	8	0	.467	50	77	16	7	9	0	51	79
Rensselaer	14	6	7	1	.464	66	51	23	10	12	1	133	100
Merrimack	12	5	7	0	.417	45	63	13	6	7	0	53	63
Middlebury	17	7	10	0	.412	79	87	22	10	12	0	104	109
Dartmouth	20	8	12	0	.400	87	87	20	8	12	0	87	87
Northeastern	25	9	16	0	.360	115	140	26	9	17	0	118	145
Colby	17	6	11	0	.353	58	89	21	7	14	0	72	103
Boston University	22	7	15	0	.318	75	90	23	7	16	0	87	101
Bowdoin	18	5	13	0	.278	92	91	19	6	13	0	101	92
American International	15	4	11	0	.267	53	119	18	7	11	0	93	125
Princeton	21	5	16	0	.238	58	118	23	6	17	0	94	124
Hamilton	16	2	13	1	.156	21	100	17	2	14	1	25	105
Amherst	15	2	13	0	.133	28	111	18	4	14	0	34	118
MIT	8	1	7	0	.125	10	65	13	2	10	1	31	96
Championship: Harvard † indicates conference regular season champion * indicates conference tournament champion

== Bracket ==
Quarterfinals; March 5
1	Boston College	3
8	Army	1
4	St. Lawrence	2*
5	Providence	1
2	Clarkson	3
7	Brown	1
3	Harvard	5
6	Colgate	3

Semifinals; March 8
1	Boston College	6
4	St. Lawrence	2
2	Clarkson	4
3	Harvard	6

Championship; March 9
1	Boston College	3
3	Harvard	4*
Third place
2	Clarkson	7
4	St. Lawrence	5

Note: * denotes overtime period(s)

=== Quarterfinals ===
==== (1) Boston College vs. (8) Army ====
March 5	Boston College	3 – 1	Army	McHugh Forum

==== (2) Clarkson vs. (7) Brown ====
March 5	Clarkson	3 – 1	Brown	Clarkson Arena

==== (3) Harvard vs. (6) Colgate ====
March 5	Harvard	5 – 3	Colgate	Donald C. Watson Rink

==== (4) St. Lawrence vs. (5) Providence ====
March 5	St. Lawrence	2 – 1	OT	Providence	Appleton Arena

=== Semifinals ===
==== (1) Boston College vs. (4) St. Lawrence ====
March 8	Boston College	6 – 2	St. Lawrence	Boston Arena

==== (2) Clarkson vs. (3) Harvard ====
March 8	Clarkson	4 – 6	Harvard	Boston Arena

=== Third Place ===
==== (2) Clarkson vs. (4) St. Lawrence ====
March 9	Clarkson	7 – 5	St. Lawrence	Boston Arena

=== Championship ===
==== (1) Boston College vs. (3) Harvard ====
March 9	Boston College	3 – 4	OT	Harvard	Boston Arena

== Tournament awards ==
=== All-Tournament Team ===
==== First Team ====
- F Jack Leetch (Boston College)
- F Corby Adams (Clarkson)
- F Gene Kinasewich* (Harvard)
- D Pat Brophy (Clarkson)
- D David Johnston (Harvard)
- G Tom Apprille (Boston College)

* Most Outstanding Player(s)

==== Second Team ====
- F Tim Taylor (Harvard)
- F Bill Hogan (Boston College)
- F Ron Mason (St. Lawrence)
- D Cal Wagner (Clarkson)
- D Jack Callahan (Boston College)
- G Godfrey Wood (Harvard)
