= Barry Thorndycraft =

Canadian ice hockey player and coach

Biographical details
- Born: October 29, 1933; Winnipeg, Manitoba, Canada
- Died: September 22, 2005 (aged 71)

Playing career
- 1950–1951: Winnipeg Canadiens
- 1951–1954: St. Boniface Canadiens
- 1954–1955: Cincinnati Mohawks
- 1955–1956: Montreal Royals
- Position: Left wing

Coaching career (HC unless noted)
- 1958–1959: North Dakota (assistant)
- 1959–1964: North Dakota

Head coaching record
- Overall: 71–65–8 (.521)
- Tournaments: 2–0 (1.000)

Accomplishments and honors

Championships
- 1963 NCAA National Champion

Awards
- 1963 WCHA Coach of the Year

Barry Thorndycraft (October 29, 1933 – September 22, 2005) was a Canadian ice hockey player and head coach most well known for his time at North Dakota where he won a National Title in 1963.

== Career ==
Thorndycraft played junior and minor league hockey for several seasons in the 1950s, winning a Turner Cup with the Cincinnati Mohawks, before trying his hand at coaching. His first job behind the bench was as an assistant for North Dakota in the year they won their first national title. When head coach Bob May left the program in the offseason Thorndycraft was chosen to replace him. His first year was promising but the team had to suffer through two down seasons before breaking through with the program's second national title in 1963. Thorndycraft coached the team one more year before moving to Switzerland to continue his coaching career.

After he retired from coaching Thorndycraft went on to work for Texaco and also became a realtor. He died in the fall of 2005 after a short illness.

== Head coaching record ==
Record table
| Season | Team | Overall | Conference | Standing | Postseason |
|---|---|---|---|---|---|
North Dakota Fighting Sioux (WCHA) (1959–1964)
| 1959–60 | North Dakota | 19–11–2 | 14–7–1 | 3rd | WCHA Finals |
| 1960–61 | North Dakota | 9–19–1 | 7–16–0 | 5th | |
| 1961–62 | North Dakota | 9–17–0 | 7–11–0 | 5th | |
| 1962–63 | North Dakota | 22–7–3 | 11–5–1 | 2nd | NCAA National Champion |
| 1963–64 | North Dakota | 12–11–2 | 5–8–1 | 5th | |
| North Dakota: | | 71–65–8 | 44–47–3 | | |
| Total: | | 71–65–8 | | | |
National champion Postseason invitational champion Conference regular season champion Conference regular season and conference tournament champion Division regular season champion Division regular season and conference tournament champion Conference tournament champion

Sporting positions
| Preceded by Bob May | Head coach of the University of North Dakota; 1959–1964 | Succeeded by Bob Peters |
Awards and achievements
| Preceded by John MacInnes | WCHA Coach of the Year; 1962–63 | Succeeded by Al Renfrew |
