= Nick Naumenko =

American ice hockey player (born 1974)

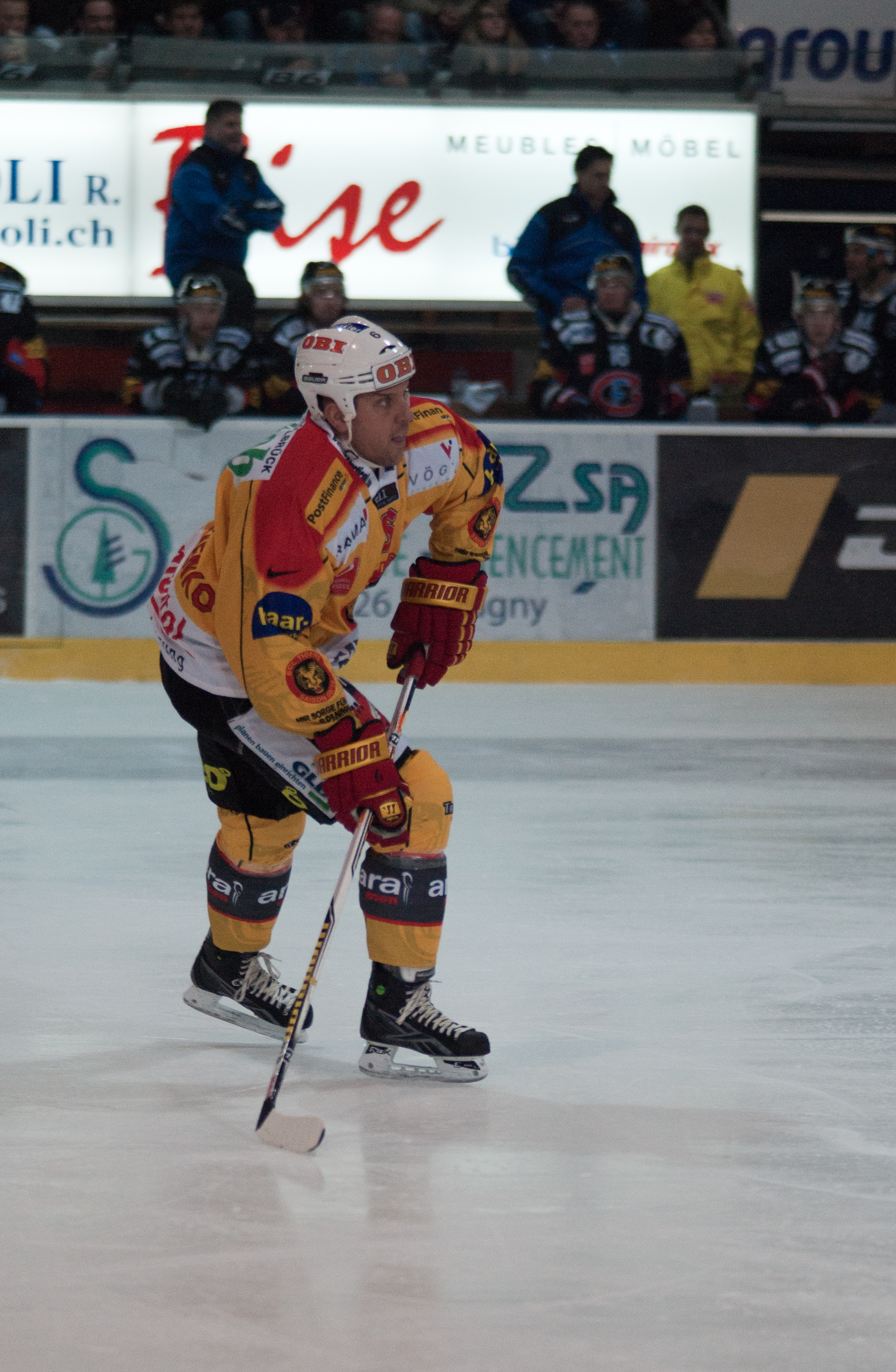
- Born: July 7, 1974 (age 51) Chicago, Illinois, U.S.
- Height: 5 ft 11 in (180 cm)
- Weight: 185 lb (84 kg; 13 st 3 lb)
- Position: Defense
- Shot: Right
- Played for: Worcester IceCats; Utah Grizzlies; Las Vegas Thunder; Kansas City Blades; Cleveland Lumberjacks; Portland Pirates; Adler Mannheim; Kassel Huskies; Hershey Bears; Chicago Wolves; Grand Rapids Griffins; HC Ambrì-Piotta; SCL Tigers
- NHL draft: 182nd overall, 1992; St. Louis Blues
- Playing career: 1996–2010

Nicholas Naumenko (born July 7, 1974) is an American former professional ice hockey defenseman. He most notably played in the International Hockey League (IHL) and American Hockey League (AHL) before finishing his career with Europe in the Swiss National League A (NLA).

== Playing career ==
Naumenko was drafted in the eighth round, 182nd overall, in the 1992 NHL entry draft by the St. Louis Blues. Naumenko played his college hockey at the University of North Dakota from 1992 to 1996, during his time at UND he played in 146 game for the Fighting Sioux scoring 38 goals and adding 102 assists. Prior to college hockey he played two seasons in the USHL for the Rochester Mustangs and Dubuque Fighting Saints.

Nick's younger brother Gregg Naumenko is also a professional ice hockey goaltender who played two games in the NHL for the Mighty Ducks of Anaheim during the 2000–01 season.

== Career statistics ==
| | | | Regular season | | | | | Playoffs |
| Season | Team | League | GP | G | A | Pts | PIM | GP | G | A | Pts | PIM |
|---|---|---|---|---|---|---|---|---|---|---|---|---|
| 1990–91 | Rochester Mustangs | USHL | 39 | 7 | 8 | 15 | 38 | — | — | — | — | — |
| 1991–92 | Rochester Mustangs | USHL | 20 | 4 | 6 | 10 | 24 | — | — | — | — | — |
| 1991–92 | Dubuque Fighting Saints | USHL | 24 | 6 | 19 | 25 | 4 | — | — | — | — | — |
| 1992–93 | U. of North Dakota | WCHA | 38 | 10 | 24 | 34 | 26 | — | — | — | — | — |
| 1993–94 | U. of North Dakota | WCHA | 32 | 4 | 22 | 26 | 22 | — | — | — | — | — |
| 1994–95 | U. of North Dakota | WCHA | 39 | 13 | 26 | 39 | 78 | — | — | — | — | — |
| 1995–96 | U. of North Dakota | WCHA | 37 | 11 | 30 | 41 | 52 | — | — | — | — | — |
| 1996–97 | Worcester IceCats | AHL | 54 | 6 | 22 | 28 | 72 | 1 | 0 | 0 | 0 | 0 |
| 1997–98 | Worcester IceCats | AHL | 71 | 12 | 34 | 46 | 63 | 11 | 1 | 7 | 8 | 9 |
| 1998–99 | Utah Grizzlies | IHL | 20 | 4 | 3 | 7 | 20 | — | — | — | — | — |
| 1998–99 | Las Vegas Thunder | IHL | 34 | 5 | 16 | 21 | 37 | — | — | — | — | — |
| 1998–99 | Kansas City Blades | IHL | 21 | 3 | 8 | 11 | 4 | 3 | 1 | 2 | 3 | 4 |
| 1999–00 | Kansas City Blades | IHL | 54 | 9 | 27 | 36 | 79 | — | — | — | — | — |
| 2000–01 | Cleveland Lumberjacks | IHL | 77 | 5 | 45 | 50 | 60 | 4 | 0 | 0 | 0 | 4 |
| 2001–02 | Portland Pirates | AHL | 75 | 15 | 35 | 50 | 40 | — | — | — | — | — |
| 2002–03 | Adler Mannheim | DEL | 39 | 6 | 17 | 23 | 46 | 8 | 1 | 2 | 3 | 10 |
| 2003–04 | Kassel Huskies | DEL | 23 | 4 | 5 | 9 | 28 | — | — | — | — | — |
| 2003–04 | Utah Grizzlies | AHL | 46 | 5 | 15 | 20 | 39 | — | — | — | — | — |
| 2004–05 | Utah Grizzlies | AHL | 6 | 0 | 0 | 0 | 6 | — | — | — | — | — |
| 2004–05 | Hershey Bears | AHL | 40 | 8 | 12 | 20 | 18 | — | — | — | — | — |
| 2005–06 | Chicago Wolves | AHL | 39 | 1 | 16 | 17 | 29 | — | — | — | — | — |
| 2006–07 | Grand Rapids Griffins | AHL | 6 | 0 | 3 | 3 | 8 | — | — | — | — | — |
| 2006–07 | HC Ambrì-Piotta | NLA | 29 | 7 | 20 | 27 | 32 | — | — | — | — | — |
| 2006–07 | EHC Biel | NLB | — | — | — | — | — | 5 | 1 | 3 | 4 | 6 |
| 2007–08 | HC Ambrì-Piotta | NLA | 44 | 10 | 28 | 38 | 60 | — | — | — | — | — |
| 2008–09 | HC Ambrì-Piotta | NLA | 40 | 10 | 27 | 37 | 42 | — | — | — | — | — |
| 2009–10 | SCL Tigers | NLA | 50 | 6 | 22 | 28 | 30 | — | — | — | — | — |
| AHL totals | | | 337 | 47 | 137 | 184 | 275 | 12 | 1 | 7 | 8 | 8 |
| IHL totals | | | 206 | 26 | 99 | 125 | 191 | 7 | 1 | 2 | 3 | 8 |

== Awards and honors ==
| Award | Year |
|---|---|
College
| All-WCHA Rookie Team | 1992–93 |
| All-WCHA First Team | 1994–95, 1995–96 |
AHL
| All-Star Game | 2002 |
