= Alec Rauhauser =

American ice hockey player

- Born: March 7, 1995 (age 31) Bismarck, North Dakota, U.S.
- Height: 6 ft 3 in (191 cm)
- Weight: 216 lb (98 kg; 15 st 6 lb)
- Position: Defense
- Shot: Left
- Played for: DVTK Jegesmedvék; Syracuse Crunch; Greenville Swamp Rabbits; HKM Zvolen
- Playing career: 2016–2024

Alec Rauhauser (born March 7, 1995) is an American ice hockey coach and former professional ice hockey defenseman who is currently an assistant coach for the Bismarck Bobcats of the North American Hockey League (NAHL). He most recently played for HKM Zvolen in the Slovak Extraliga. He was a two-time All-American for Bowling Green.

== Playing career ==
Rauhauser was a star defenseman for Century High School, averaging more than a point per game in three separate seasons. After graduating, he joined the Des Moines Buccaneers and spent three seasons with the club before beginning his college career. From the start of his tenure with Bowling Green, Rauhauser was an effective player, helping the Falcons win at least 20 games in each of his four years with the team. As a sophomore he became one of the top players in the country, leading Bowling Green in scoring and being named an All-American. For his junior season, Rauhauser's point total declined but he was able to help the Falcons reach the NCAA Tournament for the first time in almost 30 years. Rauhauser returned to his stellar form as a senior, being named team captain as well as the WCHA Defensive Player of the Year for a second time. Unfortunately, the Falcons weren't able to return to postseason play since the season was cancelled due to the COVID-19 pandemic.

Despite the uncertainty caused by the pandemic, Rauhauser signed a 1-year contract with the Florida Panthers. Due to a delay for the start of the following season, Rauhauser began the year with DVTK Jegesmedvék. Once the minor leagues restarted, Rauhauser was assigned to the Greenville Swamp Rabbits and spent most of the rest of the season with the team.

Due in part to a change in management for the Panthers, Rauhauser was not offered a qualifying deal and released as a free agent. He did, however, eventually re-sign with Greenville.

== Career statistics ==
			Regular season					Playoffs
Season	Team	League	GP	G	A	Pts	PIM	GP	G	A	Pts	PIM
2009–10	Century High School	ND-HS	27	1	9	10	14	—	—	—	—	—
2010–11	Century High School	ND-HS	21	13	20	33	20	—	—	—	—	—
2011–12	Century High School	ND-HS	25	19	28	47	27	—	—	—	—	—
2012–13	Century High School	ND-HS	27	30	37	67	50	—	—	—	—	—
2013–14	Des Moines Buccaneers	USHL	35	1	5	6	14	—	—	—	—	—
2014–15	Des Moines Buccaneers	USHL	59	7	30	37	34	—	—	—	—	—
2015–16	Des Moines Buccaneers	USHL	58	5	32	37	59	—	—	—	—	—
2016–17	Bowling Green	WCHA	39	5	17	22	22	—	—	—	—	—
2017–18	Bowling Green	WCHA	41	9	30	39	42	—	—	—	—	—
2018–19	Bowling Green	WCHA	41	4	22	26	34	—	—	—	—	—
2019–20	Bowling Green	WCHA	38	11	24	35	40	—	—	—	—	—
2020–21	DVTK Jegesmedvék	Slovak	22	4	7	11	12	—	—	—	—	—
2020–21	Allen Americans	ECHL	49	4	7	11	20	8	0	1	1	12
2020–21	Syracuse Crunch	AHL	1	0	0	0	0	—	—	—	—	—
2021–22	Greenville Swamp Rabbits	ECHL	56	4	13	17	49	6	1	2	3	8
2022–23	HKM Zvolen	Slovak	17	0	1	1	16	17	0	3	3	16
2023–24	HKM Zvolen	Slovak	49	3	17	20	63	10	2	1	3	4
Slovak totals			88	7	25	32	91	27	2	4	6	20
AHL totals			1	0	0	0	0	—	—	—	—	—

== Awards and honors ==
Award	Year
WCHA All-Rookie Team	2016–17
All-WCHA First Team	2017–18
AHCA West Second Team All-American	2017–18
All-WCHA Second Team	2018–19
All-WCHA First Team	2019–20
AHCA West Second Team All-American	2019–20

Awards and achievements
Preceded by Daniel Brickley; Philip Beaulieu	WCHA Defensive Player of the Year; 2017–18; 2019–20	Succeeded by Philip Beaulieu; Will Cullen / Elias Rosén
