= Corby Adams =

Canadian ice hockey player (1940–2023)

- Born: 1940 Springwater, Ontario, Canada
- Died: October 21, 2023 (aged 83)
- Height: 6 ft 1 in (185 cm)
- Weight: 190 lb (86 kg; 13 st 8 lb)
- Position: Left wing
- Played for: Barrie Flyers; Clarkson; Barrie Flyers (senior)
- National team: Canada
- NHL draft: Undrafted
- Playing career: 1961–1977

Corby Adams (1940 – October 21, 2023) was a Canadian ice hockey left wing who was an All-American for Clarkson.

== Career ==
Adams played several years of junior hockey in the Barrie area, reaching the top level of competition in 1960 with the Flyers. He accepted a scholarship to Clarkson and joined the varsity team in 1961, playing for Len Ceglarski, and helped the Golden Knights to a third-place finish in the inaugural season of ECAC Hockey. Adams was named First Team All-ECAC and helped the top-seeded Golden Knights reach the conference championship game. Their runner-up finish earned Clarkson a bid to the NCAA Tournament where the team defeated a Michigan team led by future NHLer Red Berenson. The victory sent Clarkson to its first championship game but the team was overwhelmed by Michigan Tech 1–8 in the finale.

For his second season, Adams led Clarkson in scoring and finished in the top ten in the nation. The Golden Knights finished second in the ECAC but were beaten in the conference semifinal by Harvard. The team finished the tournament in third place and weren't expecting to receive a bid to the NCAA tournament, however, because all Ivy League schools were engaged with a dispute over player eligibilities with the NCAA, Harvard declined its invitation and Clarkson was chosen as the replacement. The Golden Knights finished the 1963 NCAA Tournament in third place with Adams as one of the stars for Clarkson.

Prior to his senior season, Adams was named an alternate captain and, though the team's record declined the Golden Knights returned to the conference tournament. Adams made his third All-ECAC First Team and became an All-American as well. Clarkson fell in the conference semifinal again, this time to top-seeded Providence and Adams ended his collegiate career with a loss in the consolation game.

After graduating with a degree in business administration, Adams returned to Barrie and began playing for the local senior hockey team, also named the Barrie Flyers, when it was founded in 1966. Adams played for the Flyers for a decade, becoming the team's all-time leader in games (370), goals (213), assists (353) and points (566). He helped the team win the Allan Cup in 1974 as well as three other league championships in his ten seasons. Adams briefly left the team in 1970 to play with the Canadian national team but a series of decisions led Canada, who was initially supposed to host the 1970 Ice Hockey World Championships, to not even participate in the tournament.

After concluding his playing career in 1978, Adams was fondly remembered in both Barrie and Potsdam. He was inducted into the Barrie Sports Hall of Fame in 1991 and was a member of Clarkson's Inaugural Athletic Hall of Fame class in 1992. Several years later he was also enshrined in the Springwater Sports Heritage Hall of Fame.

== Death ==
Corby Adams died on October 21, 2023, at the age of 83.

== Career statistics ==
=== Regular season and playoffs ===
			Regular Season					Playoffs
Season	Team	League	GP	G	A	Pts	PIM	GP	G	A	Pts	PIM
1959–60	Barrie Flyers	OHA	4	0	1	1	0	—	—	—	—	—
1961–62	Clarkson	ECAC Hockey	25	21	25	46	—	—	—	—	—	—
1962–63	Clarkson	ECAC Hockey	27	26	30	56	25	—	—	—	—	—
1963–64	Clarkson	ECAC Hockey	24	27	27	54	—	—	—	—	—	—
1966–67	Barrie Flyers	OHA Sr.	32	13	32	45	10	—	—	—	—	—
1967–68	Barrie Flyers	OHA Sr.	40	25	34	59	48	—	—	—	—	—
1968–69	Barrie Flyers	OHA Sr.	39	28	51	79	56	—	—	—	—	—
1969–70	Barrie Flyers	OHA Sr.	24	13	15	28	22	—	—	—	—	—
1970–71	Barrie Flyers	OHA Sr.	38	30	31	61	36	—	—	—	—	—
1971–72	Barrie Flyers	OHA Sr.	39	17	41	58	26	—	—	—	—	—
1972–73	Barrie Flyers	OHA Sr.	41	25	34	59	29	—	—	—	—	—
1973–74	Barrie Flyers	OHA Sr.	36	27	32	59	16	—	—	—	—	—
1974–75	Barrie Flyers	OHA Sr.	37	12	36	48	33	—	—	—	—	—
1975–76	Barrie Flyers	OHA Sr.	40	23	47	70	28	—	—	—	—	—
1976–77	Brantford Alexanders	OHA Sr.	23	9	22	31	16	—	—	—	—	—
1977–78	Orillia Tundras	OHA Sr.	29	13	20	33	10	—	—	—	—	—
NCAA Totals			76	74	82	156	—	—	—	—	—	—
OHA Sr. Totals			418	235	395	630	330	—	—	—	—	—

== Awards and honors ==
Award	Year
All-ECAC Hockey First Team	1961–62
All-ECAC Hockey First Team	1962–63
ECAC Hockey All-Tournament First Team	1963
NCAA All-Tournament Second Team	1963
All-ECAC Hockey First Team	1963–64
AHCA East All-American	1963–64
ECAC Hockey All-Tournament Second Team	1964
