= Philip Beaulieu =

American ice hockey player (born 1995)

- Born: September 2, 1995 (age 30) Duluth, Minnesota, USA
- Height: 5 ft 11 in (180 cm)
- Weight: 194 lb (88 kg; 13 st 12 lb)
- Position: Defense
- Shoots: Right
- ECHL team Former teams: Maine Mariners; Iowa Wild; Asiago HC
- NHL draft: Undrafted
- Playing career: 2016–present

Philip Beaulieu (born September 2, 1995) is an American professional ice hockey defenseman for the Maine Mariners in the ECHL. He was an All-American for Northern Michigan.

== Playing career ==
After graduating from East High School in 2014, Beaulieu played another two years at the junior level before he got the opportunity to play college hockey. In his freshman season with Northern Michigan both Beaulieu and the Wildcats were a bit flat but all that changed in the offseason. a new head coach, Grant Potulny, was brought in and the team's fortunes appeared to change overnight. NMU won nearly twice as many games and advanced in the postseason for the first time in eight years, reaching the WCHA championship game. Beaulieu, meanwhile, saw his offensive numbers balloon and he led the nation in scoring from the blueline. Beaulieu's offensive production declined the following year but it didn't stop him from being named team captain as a senior. Unfortunately, he was unable to get Northern Michigan to improve its record and the team was knocked out in the conference quarterfinals.

The start to Beaulieu's professional career was delayed due to the COVID-19 pandemic but he did finally receive a contract with the Allen Americans for the 20–21 season. He played well in his rookie year, averaging just over a point every other game and helped the Americans reach the ECHL semifinals. His performance was good enough for the team to bring him back for a second campaign.

On June 13, 2022, after two seasons with the Americans, Beaulieu was traded to the Worcester Railers, completing a previous future considerations trade.

Following a lone season with the Railers in 2022–23, having been hampered by injury in adding 17 assists through 39 games, Beaulieu's rights were again traded in completing a future considerations trade to the Wheeling Nailers on June 20, 2023.

Beaulieu opted to return to Europe before signing a contract with the Nailers, agreeing to a one-year deal with Italian club, Asiago Hockey 1935 of the ICEHL on October 11, 2023.

Beaulieu returned to the ECHL for the 2024 season, signing with the Kalamazoo Wings.

== Career statistics ==
			Regular season					Playoffs
Season	Team	League	GP	G	A	Pts	PIM	GP	G	A	Pts	PIM
2010–11	East High School	MN-HS	24	2	4	6	8	3	1	1	2	2
2011–12	East High School	MN-HS	25	4	18	22	6	3	0	0	0	5
2012–13	East High School	MN-HS	25	6	21	27	15	3	2	5	7	0
2012–13	Fargo Force	USHL	10	0	2	2	6	—	—	—	—	—
2013–14	East High School	MN-HS	25	17	21	38	20	3	1	3	4	0
2013–14	Fargo Force	USHL	12	0	7	7	6	—	—	—	—	—
2013–14	Waterloo Black Hawks	USHL	4	0	2	2	0	1	0	0	0	0
2014–15	Waterloo Black Hawks	USHL	60	10	19	29	45	—	—	—	—	—
2015–16	Madison Capitols	USHL	60	1	13	14	32	—	—	—	—	—
2016–17	Northern Michigan	WCHA	38	3	13	16	29	—	—	—	—	—
2017–18	Northern Michigan	WCHA	43	11	31	42	36	—	—	—	—	—
2018–19	Northern Michigan	WCHA	38	6	29	35	26	—	—	—	—	—
2019–20	Northern Michigan	WCHA	38	6	19	25	32	—	—	—	—	—
2020–21	Iowa Wild	AHL	1	0	0	0	0	—	—	—	—	—
2020–21	Allen Americans	ECHL	41	5	18	23	26	2	0	0	0	4
2021–22	Allen Americans	ECHL	61	8	30	38	32	4	0	2	2	0
2022–23	Worcester Railers	ECHL	39	0	17	17	14	—	—	—	—	—
AHL totals			1	0	0	0	0	—	—	—	—	—

== Awards and honors ==
Award	Year
All-WCHA Second Team	2017–18
AHCA East Second Team All-American	2017–18
All-WCHA First Team	2018–19
All-WCHA Second Team	2019–20

Awards and achievements
Preceded by Alec Rauhauser	WCHA Defensive Player of the Year; 2018–19	Succeeded by Alec Rauhauser
