= Jack Leetch =

Canadian ice hockey player

- Born: Braintree, Massachusetts, USA
- Height: 6 ft 0 in (183 cm)
- Weight: 190 lb (86 kg; 13 st 8 lb)
- Position: Defenseman/Winger
- Played for: Boston College
- NHL draft: Undrafted
- Playing career: 1960–1963

Jack Leetch is an American former ice hockey Defenseman and Winger who was an All-American for Boston College.

== Career ==
Jack Leetch was a three-year varsity player for Boston College under John Kelley. He led the team in goals as a senior, scoring 27 and was named an All-American after having switched from Defense to Wing. Leetch helped the Eagles reach the ECAC Championship, garnering not only a spot on the All-Tournament First Team but an appearance for BC in the NCAA Tournament. The Eagles lost both of their tournament games to finish fourth but Leetch was recognized as one of their best played with another appearance on an All-Tournament Team.

After graduating, Leetch tried to make the US Olympic team but was one of the final roster cuts. He retired as a player afterwards moved to Corpus Christi, Texas where his son Brian was born. Eventually the family settled in Cheshire, Connecticut where Jack became the manager of the town's ice rink. He was able to use his position to give his children as much ice time as possible, with his son Brian showing particular promise. Brian became a star on his high school team, and the elder Leetch was able to see his son follow in his footsteps by attending Boston College; Brian would ultimately reach the NHL with the New York Rangers and join the Hockey Hall of Fame.

Jack Leetch was inducted into the Boston College Athletic Hall of Fame in 1984. Another son, Eric, played college hockey at Army and went on to become an army chaplain.

== Career statistics ==
=== Regular season and playoffs ===
			Regular Season					Playoffs
Season	Team	League	GP	G	A	Pts	PIM	GP	G	A	Pts	PIM
1960–61	Boston College	NCAA	—	—	—	—	—	—	—	—	—	—
1961–62	Boston College	ECAC Hockey	—	—	26	—	—	—	—	—	—	—
1962–63	Boston College	ECAC Hockey	—	27	—	—	—	—	—	—	—	—
NCAA Totals			84	62	72	134	—	—	—	—	—	—

== Awards and honors ==
Award	Year
All-ECAC Hockey First Team	1961–62; 1962–63
AHCA East All-American	1962–63
ECAC Hockey All-Tournament First Team	1963
NCAA All-Tournament Second Team	1963
