= Dates Fryberger =

American ice hockey player

- Born: May 5, 1940 (age 86) Duluth, MN, USA
- Height: 5 ft 10 in (178 cm)
- Weight: 161 lb (73 kg; 11 st 7 lb)
- Position: Forward
- National team: United States
- Playing career: 1959–1964

Dayton Featherstone "Dates" Fryberger (born May 5, 1940) is an American former ice hockey forward and Olympian.

Fryberger played with Team USA at the 1964 Winter Olympics held in Innsbruck, Austria. He previously played for the Panthers at Middlebury College in Vermont.

== Career ==
Principal of Dates F. Fryberger, Architect, P.A. (1980-2001), Idaho Architect License AR-624

== Awards and honors ==
Award	Year
AHCA East All-American	1961–62
AHCA East All-American	1962–63

Inducted into the Middlebury College Athletics Hall of Fame, 2017.
