= Bill Hogan III =

Canadian ice hockey player

Bill Hogan
- Born: Belmont, Massachusetts, USA
- Height: 5 ft 10 in (178 cm)
- Weight: 160 lb (73 kg; 11 st 6 lb)
- Position: Center
- Played for: Boston College
- Playing career: 1960–1963

William Hogan III is an American retired ice hockey center who was an All-American for Boston College.

== Career ==
Like his father before him, Bill Hogan played college hockey for the Eagles under head coach John Kelley. In his sophomore season, Hogan helped the Eagles compile a 19–5–1 record, but the team was passed over for the NCAA Tournament. The very next season BC joined with 27 other eastern teams to form ECAC Hockey and the Eagles set their sights on another postseason bid. Hogan led the Eagles in goals (24) and points (45) and was named an All-American and First Team All-ECAC. The Eagles made the inaugural conference tournament as the 5th seed and were defeated in the quarterfinal.

In his senior season, Hogan increased his point production again, rising to 59 points and leading the Eagles into the conference tournament as the No. 1 seed. The Eagles reached the finals and played a tight contest against long-time rival Harvard, ultimately falling 3–4 in overtime. Because the ECAC possessed every top Division team in the east, Boston College was nearly assured a bid into the tournament as the second seed and when Harvard declined the invitation (the only conference champion to ever do so) they were given the top eastern seed. Despite high hopes, the Eagles played poorly in the championship, losing the semifinal 2–8 to North Dakota and then dropping the consolation game to Clarkson. Hogan received a consolation after the season by receiving the Walter Brown Award given to the best American-born college hockey player in the East.

Hogan was inducted into the Boston College Athletic Hall of Fame in 1979.

== Career statistics ==
=== Regular season and playoffs ===
			Regular Season					Playoffs
Season	Team	League	GP	G	A	Pts	PIM	GP	G	A	Pts	PIM
1960–61	Boston College	NCAA	—	15	11	26	—	—	—	—	—	—
1961–62	Boston College	ECAC Hockey	—	24	21	45	—	—	—	—	—	—
1962–63	Boston College	ECAC Hockey	—	19	40	59	—	—	—	—	—	—
NCAA Totals			84	58	72	130	—	—	—	—	—	—

== Awards and honors ==
Award	Year
All-ECAC Hockey First Team	1961–62; 1962–63
AHCA East All-American	1961–62
ECAC Hockey All-Tournament Second Team	1963
