= Dave Merrifield =

Canadian ice hockey player

- Born: February 12, 1941 (age 85) Port Arthur, Ontario, Canada
- Height: 5 ft 7 in (170 cm)
- Weight: 164 lb (74 kg; 11 st 10 lb)
- Position: Center
- Played for: North Dakota
- NHL draft: Undrafted
- Playing career: 1960–1963

David Merrifield is a Canadian retired ice hockey Center who was an All-American for North Dakota and helped the team win the 1963 NCAA Tournament.

== Career ==
Merrifield was a three-year starter for North Dakota beginning in 1960. In his sophomore and junior seasons, the Fighting Sioux were a fairly poor team, missing the conference tournament both seasons. In his senior year, however, both the defense and offense vastly improved and UND tied Denver for the regular season championship. Merrifield was second on the team with 51 points and was named as both a All-WCHA First Teamer and an All-American. After the Fighting Sioux finished as runner-up for the WCHA Tournament the team set its sights on the National Championship. After easily dispatching Boston College in the semifinal, UND roared out to an early lead in the championship game. Merrifield assisted on two of the Sioux's 5 first period goals and the early lead enabled UND to hold on despite a furious surge from Denver at the end, winning the match 6–5. Merrifield was named to All-Tournament First Team

After graduating, Merrifield joined the Canadian National Team in the run up to the 1964 Winter Olympics. He was one of four players who remained with the squad but did not participate in any of the games. Merrifield retired after the 1964 season.

== Career statistics ==
=== Regular season and playoffs ===
			Regular Season					Playoffs
Season	Team	League	GP	G	A	Pts	PIM	GP	G	A	Pts	PIM
1960–61	North Dakota	WCHA	29	19	20	39	12	—	—	—	—	—
1961–62	North Dakota	WCHA	15	5	9	14	32	—	—	—	—	—
1962–63	North Dakota	WCHA	32	21	30	51	28	—	—	—	—	—
1963–64	Canadian National Team	International	—	—	—	—	—	—	—	—	—	—
NCAA Totals			76	45	59	104	72	—	—	—	—	—

== Awards and honors ==
Award	Year
All-WCHA First Team	1962–63
AHCA West All-American	1962–63
NCAA All-Tournament First Team	1963
