= List of men's All-WCHA Hockey Teams =

The All-WCHA Hockey Teams are composed of players at all positions from teams that are members of the Western Collegiate Hockey Association (WCHA), an NCAA Division I hockey-only conference. Each year, from 1959–60 onward, at the conclusion of the WCHA regular season, the head coaches of each member team vote for players to be placed on each all-sir team. The First Team and Second Team have been named in each WCHA Hockey season with a Third Team added in 1995–96; a Rookie Team was added starting in 1990–91.

The all-conference teams are composed of one goaltender, two defensemen, and three forwards. If a tie occurred for the final selection at any position, both players were included as part of the greater all-conference team; if a tie resulted in an increase in the number of superior all-stars, the inferior team would not be reduced in number (as happened in 1963–64). Players may only appear once per year on any of the first, second, or third teams but a freshman may appear on both the rookie team and one of the other all-conference teams.

In 1951–52, the Midwest Collegiate Hockey League (MCHL) formed as a conference. Two years later, it changed its name to the Western Intercollegiate Hockey League (WIHL). By 1957–58, however, a major disagreement over recruiting caused the dissolution of the conference with all member teams becoming independent schools for the following season. After one season without a formalized conference, all of the schools involved in the spat discovered that not being in a conference was worse than the alternative so the WCHA was formed. Because all of the WCHA founding teams played in the WIHL/MCHL, the former league's all-star teams (1951–1958) are included in this list.

After the Big Ten formed a college hockey conference starting in 2013–14, the WCHA lost 8 of its member teams from the previous season (Colorado College, Denver, Minnesota, Minnesota-Duluth, Nebraska-Omaha, North Dakota, St. Cloud State and Wisconsin), leaving Michigan Tech as the only founding member remaining in the WCHA.

== All-conference teams ==
See footnotes.

Note: There were no all-conference teams for the 1958–1959 season, because the original conference dissolved in 1958.

=== First Team ===
==== 1950s ====
1951–52
Player	Pos	Team
Ken Kinsley	G	Colorado College
Don Burgess	D	Denver
Eddie Miller	D	Denver
Tony Frasca	F	Colorado College
Ron Hartwell	F	Colorado College
Omer Brandt	F	Colorado College

1952–53
Player	Pos	Team
Jim Mattson	G	Minnesota
Tom Wegleitner	D	Minnesota
Eddie Miller	D	Denver
Ben Cherski	F	North Dakota
Richard Dougherty	F	Minnesota
John Mayasich	F	Minnesota

1953–54
Player	Pos	Team
Jim Mattson	G	Minnesota
Ken Yackel	D	Minnesota
Jim Haas	D	Michigan
John Mayasich	F	Minnesota
Richard Dougherty	F	Minnesota
Ben Cherski	F	North Dakota

1954–55
Player	Pos	Team
Bob McManus	G	Michigan Tech
Ken Yackel	D	Minnesota
Phil Hilton	D	Colorado College
John Mayasich	F	Minnesota
Bill Reichart	F	North Dakota
Clare Smith	F	Colorado College

1955–56
Player	Pos	Team
Lorne Howes	G	Michigan
Ken Yackel	D	Minnesota
Doug Silverberg	D	Colorado College
Bill MacFarland	F	Michigan
Bill Reichart	F	North Dakota
Jack McManus	F	Michigan Tech

1956–57
Player	Pos	Team
Jack McCartan	G	Minnesota
Bill Steenson	D	North Dakota
Don Wishart	D	Colorado College
Bill Hay	F	Colorado College
Bill Reichart	F	North Dakota
Bob McCusker	F	Colorado College

1957–58
Player	Pos	Team
Jack McCartan	G	Minnesota
Bill Steenson	D	North Dakota
Ed Zemrau	D	Denver
Bill Hay	F	Colorado College
Ike Scott	F	Colorado College
Bob McCusker	F	Colorado College

==== 1960s ====
1959–60
Player	Pos	Team
George Kirkwood	G	Denver
Marty Howe	D	Denver
Henry Åkervall	D	Michigan Tech
Reg Morelli	F	North Dakota
Bill Masterton	F	Denver
John Kosiancic	F	Michigan Tech

1960–61
Player	Pos	Team
George Kirkwood	G	Denver
Marty Howe	D	Denver
George Konik	D	Denver
Red Berenson	F	Michigan
Bill Masterton	F	Denver
Jerry Walker	F	Denver

1961–62
Player	Pos	Team
Garry Bauman	G	Michigan Tech
Henry Åkervall	D	Michigan Tech
Jack Wilson	D	Denver
Red Berenson	F	Michigan
Jerry Sullivan	F	Michigan Tech
Lou Angotti	F	Michigan Tech

1962–63
Player	Pos	Team
Garry Bauman	G	Michigan Tech
Lou Nanne	D	Minnesota
Don Ross	D	North Dakota
Bill Staub	F	Denver
Dave Merrifield	F	North Dakota
Gary Butler	F	Michigan
George Hill	F	Michigan Tech

1963–64
Player	Pos	Team
Garry Bauman	G	Michigan Tech
Norm Wimmer	D	Michigan Tech
Tom Polanic	D	Michigan
Bill Staub	F	Denver
Gordon Wilkie	F	Michigan
Gary Butler	F	Michigan
John Simus	F	Colorado College

1964–65
Player	Pos	Team
Tony Esposito	G	Michigan Tech
Don Ross	D	North Dakota
Wayne Smith	D	Denver
Gerry Kell	F	North Dakota
Mel Wakabayashi	F	Michigan
Doug Woog	F	Minnesota

1965–66
Player	Pos	Team
Tony Esposito	G	Michigan Tech
Wayne Smith	D	Denver
Bruce Riutta	D	Michigan Tech
Doug Volmar	F	Michigan State
Terry Casey	F	North Dakota
Dennis Hextall	F	North Dakota

1966–67
Player	Pos	Team
Tony Esposito	G	Michigan Tech
Keith Magnuson	D	Denver
Jerry Lafond	D	North Dakota
Keith Christiansen	F	Minnesota-Duluth
Jim Wiste	F	Denver
Tom Mikkola	F	Michigan State

1967–68
Player	Pos	Team
Mike Curran	G	North Dakota
Keith Magnuson	D	Denver
Terry Abram	D	North Dakota
Bob Munro	F	North Dakota
Jim Wiste	F	Denver
Gary Gambucci	F	Minnesota

1968–69
Player	Pos	Team
Murray McLachlan	G	Minnesota
Keith Magnuson	D	Denver
Terry Abram	D	North Dakota
George Morrison	F	Denver
Bob Munro	F	North Dakota
Al Karlander	F	Michigan Tech

==== 1970s ====
1969–70
Player	Pos	Team
Murray McLachlan	G	Minnesota
John Marks	D	North Dakota
Ron Busniuk	D	Minnesota-Duluth
George Morrison	F	Denver
Murray Keogan	F	Minnesota-Duluth
Bob Collyard	F	Colorado College

1970–71
Player	Pos	Team
Morris Trewin	G	Michigan Tech
Mike Christie	D	Denver
Bob Murray	D	Michigan Tech
Walt Ledingham	F	Minnesota-Duluth
Don Thompson	F	Michigan State
Bob Collyard	F	Colorado College

1971–72
Player	Pos	Team
Jim Watt	G	Michigan State
Alan Hangsleben	D	North Dakota
Bob Winograd	D	Colorado College
Jim Cahoon	F	North Dakota
Doug Palazzari	F	Colorado College
Tom Peluso	F	Denver

1972–73
Player	Pos	Team
Ron Grahame	G	Denver
Bob Boyd	D	Michigan State
Bruce Affleck	D	Denver
Rob Palmer	F	Denver
Eddie Bumbacco	F	Notre Dame
Peter McNab	F	Denver

1973–74
Player	Pos	Team
Brad Shelstad	G	Minnesota
Jim Nahrgang	D	Michigan Tech
Norm Barnes	D	Michigan State
Doug Palazzari	F	Colorado College
Steve Colp	F	Michigan State
Mike Zuke	F	Michigan Tech

1974–75
Player	Pos	Team
Jim Warden	G	Michigan Tech
Brian Engblom	G	Wisconsin
Gord McDonald	D	Minnesota-Duluth
Tom Ross	F	Michigan State
Bob D'Alvise	F	Michigan Tech
Mike Polich	F	Minnesota

1975–76
Player	Pos	Team
Eddie Mio	G	Colorado College
Jack Brownschidle	D	Notre Dame
Reed Larson	D	Minnesota
Tom Ross	F	Michigan State
George Lyle	F	Michigan Tech
Mike Zuke	F	Michigan Tech

1976–77
Player	Pos	Team
Julian Baretta	G	Wisconsin
Jack Brownschidle	D	Notre Dame
Craig Norwich	D	Wisconsin
Brian Walsh	F	Notre Dame
Dave Debol	F	Michigan
Kris Manery	F	Michigan

1977–78
Player	Pos	Team
Ernie Glanville	G	Denver
Curt Giles	D	Minnesota-Duluth
Bill Himmelright	D	North Dakota
Doug Berry	F	Denver
Mark Johnson	F	Wisconsin
Mike Eaves	F	Wisconsin

1978–79
Player	Pos	Team
Bob Iwabuchi	G	North Dakota
Curt Giles	D	Minnesota-Duluth
Bill Baker	D	Minnesota
Mark Pavelich	F	Minnesota-Duluth
Mark Johnson	F	Wisconsin
Kevin Maxwell	F	North Dakota

==== 1980s ====
1979–80
Player	Pos	Team
Roy Schultz	G	Wisconsin
Dave Feamster	D	Colorado College
Howard Walker	D	North Dakota
Tim Harrer	F	Minnesota
Mark Taylor	F	North Dakota
Greg Meredith	F	Notre Dame

1980–81
Player	Pos	Team
Ron Scott	G	Michigan State
Marc Chorney	D	North Dakota
Tim Watters	D	Michigan Tech
Steve Ulseth	F	Minnesota
Neal Broten	F	Minnesota
Aaron Broten	F	Minnesota

1981–82
Player	Pos	Team
Jon Casey	G	North Dakota
Doug Lidster	D	Colorado College
Bruce Driver	D	Wisconsin
Ed Beers	F	Denver
Phil Sykes	F	North Dakota
John Newberry	F	Wisconsin

1982–83
Player	Pos	Team
Bob Mason	G	Minnesota-Duluth
James Patrick	D	North Dakota
Doug Lidster	D	Colorado College
Scott Bjugstad	F	Minnesota
Bryan Erickson	F	Minnesota
Patrick Flatley	F	Wisconsin

1983–84
Player	Pos	Team
Jon Casey	G	North Dakota
Tom Kurvers	D	Minnesota-Duluth
Jim Leavins	D	Denver
Bill Watson	F	Minnesota-Duluth
Dan Brennan	F	North Dakota
Tom Rothstein	F	Minnesota

1984–85
Player	Pos	Team
Rick Kosti	G	Minnesota-Duluth
Tim Thomas	D	Wisconsin
Norm Maciver	D	Minnesota-Duluth
Bill Watson	F	Minnesota-Duluth
Pat Micheletti	F	Minnesota
Jim Archibald	F	North Dakota

1985–86
Player	Pos	Team
John Blue	G	Minnesota
Norm Maciver	D	Minnesota-Duluth
Scott Sandelin	D	North Dakota
Dallas Gaume	F	Denver
Gary Emmons	F	Northern Michigan
Brett Hull	F	Minnesota-Duluth

1986–87
Player	Pos	Team
Ed Belfour	G	North Dakota
Rob Doyle	D	Colorado College
Ian Kidd	D	North Dakota
Tony Hrkac	F	North Dakota
Bob Joyce	F	North Dakota
Gary Emmons	F	Northern Michigan

1987–88
Player	Pos	Team
Robb Stauber	G	Minnesota
Mike DeAngelis	D	Minnesota-Duluth
Randy Skarda	D	Minnesota
Phil Berger	F	Northern Michigan
Paul Ranheim	F	Wisconsin
Steve Johnson	F	North Dakota

1988–89
Player	Pos	Team
Curtis Joseph	G	Wisconsin
Paul Stanton	D	Wisconsin
Darryl Olsen	D	Northern Michigan
Daryn McBride	F	Denver
Shawn Harrison	F	Michigan Tech
Tom Chorske	F	Minnesota

==== 1990s ====
1989–90
Player	Pos	Team
Chad Erickson	G	Minnesota-Duluth
Kip Noble	D	Michigan Tech
Russ Parent	D	North Dakota
Peter Hakinson	F	Minnesota
Gary Shuchuk	F	Wisconsin
Dave Shields	F	Denver

1990–91
Player	Pos	Team
Bill Pye	G	Northern Michigan
Bret Hedican	D	St. Cloud State
Brad Werenka	D	Northern Michigan
Russ Romaniuk	F	North Dakota
Greg Johnson	F	North Dakota
Scott Beattie	F	Northern Michigan

1991–92
Player	Pos	Team
Duane Derksen	G	Wisconsin
Greg Andrusak	D	Minnesota-Duluth
Chris Hynnes	D	Colorado College
Greg Johnson	F	North Dakota
Larry Olimb	F	Minnesota
Dallas Drake	F	Northern Michigan

1992–93
Player	Pos	Team
Jamie Ram	G	Michigan Tech
Barry Richter	D	Wisconsin
Brett Hauer	D	Minnesota-Duluth
Fred Knipscheer	F	St. Cloud State
Greg Johnson	F	North Dakota
Derek Plante	F	Minnesota-Duluth

1993–94
Player	Pos	Team
Jamie Ram	G	Michigan Tech
Chris McAlpine	D	Minnesota
Shawn Reid	D	Colorado College
Jay McNeill	F	Colorado College
Kelly Fairchild	F	Wisconsin
Chris Marinucci	F	Minnesota-Duluth

1994–95
Player	Pos	Team
Ryan Bach	G	Colorado College
Nick Naumenko	D	North Dakota
Brian Rafalski	D	Wisconsin
Greg Hadden	F	Northern Michigan
Jay McNeill	F	Colorado College
Brian Bonin	F	Minnesota

1995–96
Player	Pos	Team
Ryan Bach	G	Colorado College
Mike Crowley	D	Minnesota
Nick Naumenko	D	North Dakota
Brian Bonin	F	Minnesota
Peter Geronazzo	F	Colorado College
Teeder Wynne	F	North Dakota

1996–97
Player	Pos	Team
Steve DeBus	G	Minnesota
Mike Crowley	D	Minnesota
Curtis Murphy	D	North Dakota
Brian Swanson	F	Colorado College
Jason Blake	F	North Dakota
David Hoogsteen	F	North Dakota

1997–98
Player	Pos	Team
Karl Goehring	G	North Dakota
Craig Anderson	D	Wisconsin
Curtis Murphy	D	North Dakota
Brian Swanson	F	Colorado College
Jason Blake	F	North Dakota
Andre Savage	F	Michigan Tech

1998–99
Player	Pos	Team
Gregg Naumenko	G	Alaska-Anchorage
Brad Williamson	D	North Dakota
Scott Swanson	D	Colorado College
Brian Swanson	F	Colorado College
Jason Blake	F	North Dakota
Paul Comrie	F	Denver

==== 2000s ====
1999–00
Player	Pos	Team
Karl Goehring	G	North Dakota
Mike Pudlick	D	St. Cloud State
Jeff Dessner	D	Wisconsin
Dany Heatley	F	Wisconsin
Jeff Panzer	F	North Dakota
Steven Reinprecht	F	Wisconsin

2000–01
Player	Pos	Team
Scott Meyer	G	St. Cloud State
Travis Roche	D	North Dakota
Jordan Leopold	D	Minnesota
Jeff Panzer	F	North Dakota
Bryan Lundbohm	F	North Dakota
Mark Cullen	F	Colorado College

2001–02
Player	Pos	Team
Wade Dubielewicz	G	Denver
Jordan Leopold	D	Minnesota
Andy Reierson	D	Minnesota-Duluth
Mark Hartigan	F	St. Cloud State
John Pohl	F	Minnesota
Mark Cullen	F	Colorado College

2002–03
Player	Pos	Team
Curtis McElhinney	G	Colorado College
Tom Preissing	D	Colorado College
Aaron MacKenzie	D	Denver
Peter Sejna	F	Colorado College
Shane Joseph	F	Minnesota State
Grant Stevenson	F	Minnesota State

2003–04
Player	Pos	Team
Bernd Brückler	G	Wisconsin
Keith Ballard	D	Minnesota
Beau Geisler	D	Minnesota-Duluth
Junior Lessard	F	Minnesota-Duluth
Brandon Bochenski	F	North Dakota
Zach Parise	F	North Dakota

2004–05
Player	Pos	Team
Curtis McElhinney	G	Colorado College
Matt Carle	D	Denver
Brett Skinner	D	Denver
Marty Sertich	F	Colorado College
Brett Sterling	F	Colorado College
Colin Murphy	F	Michigan Tech

2005–06
Player	Pos	Team
Bobby Goepfert	G	St. Cloud State
Matt Carle	D	Denver
Tom Gilbert	D	Wisconsin
Ryan Potulny	F	Minnesota
Brett Sterling	F	Colorado College
Paul Stastny	F	Denver

2006–07
Player	Pos	Team
Bobby Goepfert	G	St. Cloud State
Alex Goligoski	D	Minnesota
Matt Niskanen	D	Minnesota-Duluth
Ryan Duncan	F	North Dakota
Mason Raymond	F	Minnesota-Duluth
Andrew Gordon	F	St. Cloud State

2007–08
Player	Pos	Team
Richard Bachman	G	Colorado College
Jack Hillen	D	Colorado College
Taylor Chorney	D	North Dakota
Chad Rau	F	Colorado College
T. J. Oshie	F	North Dakota
Ryan Lasch	F	St. Cloud State

2008–09
Player	Pos	Team
Alex Stalock	G	Minnesota-Duluth
Jamie McBain	D	Wisconsin
Chay Genoway	D	North Dakota
Ryan Stoa	F	Minnesota
Chad Rau	F	Colorado College
Ryan Lasch	F	St. Cloud State

==== 2010s ====
2009–10
Player	Pos	Team
Marc Cheverie	G	Denver
Brendan Smith	D	Wisconsin
Patrick Wiercioch	D	Denver
Rhett Rakhshani	F	Denver
Blake Geoffrion	F	Wisconsin
Jack Connolly	F	Minnesota-Duluth

2010–11
Player	Pos	Team
Aaron Dell	G	North Dakota
Justin Schultz	D	Wisconsin
Chay Genoway	D	North Dakota
Matt Frattin	F	North Dakota
Jack Connolly	F	Minnesota-Duluth
Mike Connolly	F	Minnesota-Duluth

2011–12
Player	Pos	Team
Kent Patterson	G	Minnesota
Justin Schultz	D	Wisconsin
Joey LaLeggia	D	Denver
Jack Connolly	F	Minnesota-Duluth
Nick Bjugstad	F	Minnesota
J. T. Brown	F	Minnesota-Duluth

2012–13
Player	Pos	Team
Stephon Williams	G	Minnesota State
Nate Schmidt	D	Minnesota
Nick Jensen	D	St. Cloud State
Ryan Walters	F	Nebraska-Omaha
Drew LeBlanc	F	St. Cloud State
Danny Kristo	F	North Dakota

2013–14
Player	Pos	Team
C. J. Motte	G	Ferris State
Zach Palmquist	D	Minnesota State
Colton Parayko	D	Alaska
Matt Leitner	F	Minnesota State
Matt Bailey	F	Alaska-Anchorage
Cody Kunyk	F	Alaska

2014–15
Player	Pos	Team
Jamie Philips	G	Michigan Tech
Colton Parayko	D	Alaska
Zach Palmquist	D	Minnesota State
Tanner Kero	F	Michigan Tech
Matt Leitner	F	Minnesota State
Tyler Morley	F	Alaska

2015–16
Player	Pos	Team
Chris Nell	G	Bowling Green
Casey Nelson	D	Minnesota State
Mark Friedman	D	Bowling Green
Alex Petan	F	Michigan Tech
Teodors Bļugers	F	Minnesota State
Tyler Morley	F	Alaska

2016–17
Player	Pos	Team
Michael Bitzer	G	Bemidji State
Daniel Brickley	D	Minnesota State
Matt Roy	D	Michigan Tech
Gerald Mayhew	F	Ferris State
Mitchell McLain	F	Bowling Green
Marc Michaelis	F	Minnesota State

2017–18
Player	Pos	Team
Atte Tolvanen	G	Northern Michigan
Zach Frye	D	Alaska
Alec Rauhauser	D	Bowling Green
C. J. Suess	F	Minnesota State
Marc Michaelis	F	Minnesota State
Troy Loggins	F	Northern Michigan

2018–19
Player	Pos	Team
Atte Tolvanen	G	Northern Michigan
Philip Beaulieu	D	Northern Michigan
Cooper Zech	D	Ferris State
Diego Cuglietta	F	Lake Superior State
Marc Michaelis	F	Minnesota State
Troy Loggins	F	Northern Michigan

==== 2020s ====
2019–20
Player	Pos	Team
Dryden McKay	G	Minnesota State
Connor Mackey	D	Minnesota State
Alec Rauhauser	D	Bowling Green
Marc Michaelis	F	Minnesota State
Adam Brady	F	Bemidji State
Chris Jandric	F	Alaska

2020–21
Player	Pos	Team
Dryden McKay	G	Minnesota State
Will Cullen	D	Bowling Green
Elias Rosén	D	Bemidji State
Brandon Kruse	F	Bowling Green
Julian Napravnik	F	Minnesota State
Connor Ford	F	Bowling Green

==== First Team players by school ====
Final Teams

School	Winners
Michigan Tech	36
Minnesota State	19
Northern Michigan	14
Bowling Green	8
Alaska	7
Bemidji State	3
Ferris State	3
Alaska-Anchorage	2
Lake Superior State	1

Previous Teams

School	Winners
North Dakota	72
Minnesota	53
Colorado College	48
Denver	48
Minnesota-Duluth	33
Wisconsin	30
St. Cloud State	12
Michigan	12
Notre Dame	5
Nebraska-Omaha	1

==== Multiple appearances ====
Player	First Team appearances
Marc Michaelis	4
Garry Bauman	3
Jason Blake	3
Jack Connolly	3
Tony Esposito	3
Greg Johnson	3
Keith Magnuson	3
John Mayasich	3
Bill Reichart	3
Brian Swanson	3
Ken Yackel	3
many player tied with	2

=== Second Team ===
==== 1950s ====
1951–52
Player	Pos	Team
Willard Ikola	G	Michigan
Joe deBastiani	D	Michigan Tech
Elwood Shell	D	North Dakota
John Mayasich	F	Minnesota
John McKennell	F	Michigan
Bill Abbott	F	Denver

1952–53
Player	Pos	Team
Willard Ikola	G	Michigan
Alex MacLellan	D	Michigan
Elwood Shell	D	North Dakota
Gene Campbell	F	Minnesota
John Matchefts	F	Michigan
Bill Abbott	F	Denver
Joe deBastiani	F	Michigan Tech

1953–54
Player	Pos	Team
Spike Schultz	G	North Dakota
Phil Hilton	D	Colorado College
Bill Abbott	D	Denver
Doug Mullen	F	Michigan
George Chin	F	Michigan
Bill MacFarland	F	Michigan
Jack Smith	F	Denver

1954–55
Player	Pos	Team
Jeff Simus	G	Colorado College
Doug Silverberg	D	Colorado College
Bob Schiller	D	Michigan
Bill Abbott	D	Denver
Jack McManus	F	Michigan Tech
Bunt Hubchik	F	Colorado College
Bill MacFarland	F	Michigan
Jack Smith	F	Denver

1955–56
Player	Pos	Team
Bob McManus	G	Michigan Tech
Ed Zemrau	D	Denver
Bob Pitts	D	Michigan
John Andrews	F	Colorado College
Tom Rendall	F	Michigan
Clare Smith	F	Colorado College

1956–57
Player	Pos	Team
Tom Yurkovich	G	North Dakota
Bob Pitts	D	Michigan
Bob Schiller	D	Michigan
Jack McManus	F	Michigan Tech
Tom Rendall	F	Michigan
Tom Kennedy	F	Michigan Tech

1957–58
Player	Pos	Team
Joe Selinger	G	Michigan State
Bob Watt	D	Michigan
Mike Pearson	D	Minnesota
Dick Burg	F	Minnesota
Jim Ridley	F	North Dakota
Murray Massier	F	Denver

==== 1960s ====
1959–60
Player	Pos	Team
George Cuculick	G	Michigan Tech
Guy LaFrance	D	North Dakota
George Konik	D	Denver
Gerald Fabbro	F	Michigan Tech
John MacMillan	F	Denver
Paul Coppo	F	Michigan Tech

1960–61
Player	Pos	Team
Bill Rowe	G	Michigan Tech
John Palenstein	D	Michigan
Henry Åkervall	D	Michigan Tech
Lou Angotti	F	Michigan Tech
Bill Colpitts	F	North Dakota
Jerry Sullivan	F	Michigan Tech

1961–62
Player	Pos	Team
Bob Gray	G	Michigan
Elov Seger	D	Michigan Tech
Don Rodgers	D	Michigan
Gene Rebellato	F	Michigan Tech
Trent Beatty	F	Denver
Gordon Wilkie	F	Michigan

1962–63
Player	Pos	Team
Joe Lech	G	North Dakota
Gary Begg	D	Michigan Tech
Jack Wilson	D	Denver
Dominic Fragomeni	F	Denver
John Ivanitz	F	Michigan Tech
Al McLean	F	North Dakota

1963–64
Player	Pos	Team
Buddy Blom	G	Denver
Wayne Smith	D	Denver
Jim Kenning	D	Denver
Carl Lackey	D	Michigan State
Craig Falkman	F	Minnesota
Scott Watson	F	Michigan Tech
George Hill	F	Michigan Tech

1964–65
Player	Pos	Team
Joe Lech	G	North Dakota
Dennis Huculak	D	Michigan Tech
Tom Polanic	D	Michigan
Gary Milroy	F	Michigan Tech
Doug Roberts	F	Michigan State
Dennis Hextall	F	North Dakota

1965–66
Player	Pos	Team
John Lothrop	G	Minnesota
Dennis Huculak	D	Michigan Tech
Bob Hill	D	Minnesota-Duluth
Wayne Weller	F	Michigan Tech
Mel Wakabayashi	F	Michigan
Gary Gambucci	F	Minnesota

1966–67
Player	Pos	Team
Rick Best	G	Michigan Tech
Paul Domm	D	Michigan
Bruce Riutta	D	Michigan Tech
Bob Toothill	F	Michigan Tech
Gary Milroy	F	Michigan Tech
Bob Lindberg	F	Colorado College

1967–68
Player	Pos	Team
Gerry Powers	G	Denver
Dick Paradise	D	Minnesota
Dick Sieradzki	D	Michigan Tech
Bill Klatt	F	Minnesota
Cliff Koroll	F	Denver
Al Karlander	F	Michigan Tech

1968–69
Player	Pos	Team
Gerry Powers	G	Denver
Paul Domm	D	Michigan
John Marks	D	North Dakota
Dave Kartio	F	North Dakota
Tom Miller	F	Denver
Bob Collyard	F	Colorado College

==== 1970s ====
1969–70
Player	Pos	Team
Wayne Thomas	G	Wisconsin
John Jagger	D	Wisconsin
Wally Olds	D	Minnesota
Bernie Gagnon	F	Michigan
Murray Heatley	F	Wisconsin
Tom Gilmore	F	Denver

1970–71
Player	Pos	Team
Chico Resch	G	Minnesota-Duluth
John Jagger	D	Wisconsin
Wally Olds	D	Minnesota
Murray Heatley	F	Wisconsin
Vic Venasky	F	Denver
Mike Usitalo	F	Michigan Tech

1971–72
Player	Pos	Team
Jim Makey	G	Wisconsin
Bob Boyd	D	Michigan State
Rick Wilson	D	North Dakota
Walt Ledingham	F	Minnesota-Duluth
Bernie Gagnon	F	Michigan
Don Thompson	F	Michigan State

1972–73
Player	Pos	Team
Jim Makey	G	Wisconsin
Bill Nyrop	D	Notre Dame
Jim Nahrgang	D	Michigan Tech
Ian Williams	F	Notre Dame
Norm Cherrey	F	Wisconsin
Pat Boutette	F	Minnesota-Duluth

1973–74
Player	Pos	Team
Rick Quance	G	Michigan Tech
Gord McDonald	D	Minnesota-Duluth
Bruce Affleck	D	Denver
Lorne Stamler	F	Michigan Tech
Tom Ross	F	Michigan State
Ray Delorenzi	F	Notre Dame

1974–75
Player	Pos	Team
Eddie Mio	G	Colorado College
Bob Lorimer	G	Michigan Tech
Les Auge	D	Minnesota
Mike Zuke	F	Michigan Tech
Jim Warner	F	Colorado College
Thomas Milani	F	Minnesota-Duluth

1975–76
Player	Pos	Team
Robbie Moore	G	Michigan
Dave Langevin	D	Minnesota-Duluth
Craig Norwich	D	Wisconsin
Dave Debol	F	Michigan
Thomas Milani	F	Minnesota-Duluth
Steve Colp	F	Michigan State

1976–77
Player	Pos	Team
John Peterson	G	Notre Dame
Greg Woods	D	Denver
John Taft	D	Wisconsin
Dan Lempe	F	Minnesota-Duluth
Roger Lamoureux	F	North Dakota
Mike Eaves	F	Wisconsin

1977–78
Player	Pos	Team
Julian Baretta	G	Wisconsin
Greg Woods	D	Denver
Lex Hudson	D	Denver
Greg Whyte	F	Colorado College
Steve Christoff	F	Minnesota
Dave Delich	F	Colorado College
Perry Schnarr	F	Denver

1978–79
Player	Pos	Team
John Rockwell	G	Michigan Tech
Bob Suter	D	Wisconsin
Dave Feamster	D	Colorado College
Gord Salt	F	Michigan Tech
Dave Delich	F	Colorado College
Steve Christoff	F	Minnesota

==== 1980s ====
1979–80
Player	Pos	Team
Tom Frame	G	Colorado College
Theran Welsh	D	Wisconsin
Marc Chorney	D	North Dakota
Doug Smail	F	North Dakota
Murray Eaves	F	Michigan
Dan Lempe	F	Minnesota-Duluth

1980–81
Player	Pos	Team
Paul Fricker	G	Michigan
John Blum	D	Michigan
Theran Welsh	D	Wisconsin
Ken Berry	F	Denver
Bruce Aikens	F	Colorado College
Troy Murray	F	North Dakota

1981–82
Player	Pos	Team
Marc Behrend	G	Wisconsin
James Patrick	D	North Dakota
Craig Ludwig	D	North Dakota
Bryan Erickson	F	Minnesota
Gregg Moore	F	Minnesota-Duluth
Troy Murray	F	North Dakota

1982–83
Player	Pos	Team
Jon Casey	G	North Dakota
Bruce Driver	D	Wisconsin
Chris Chelios	D	Wisconsin
Paul Houck	F	Wisconsin
Dave Tippett	F	North Dakota
Gregg Moore	F	Minnesota-Duluth

1983–84
Player	Pos	Team
Rick Kosti	G	Minnesota-Duluth
Tony Kellin	D	Minnesota
Rick Zombo	D	North Dakota
Norm Maciver	D	Minnesota-Duluth
Tom Herzig	F	Minnesota-Duluth
Bob Lakso	F	Minnesota-Duluth
Matt Christensen	F	Minnesota-Duluth

1984–85
Player	Pos	Team
John Blue	G	Minnesota
Rob Doyle	D	Colorado College
Doug Clarke	D	Colorado College
Matt Christensen	F	Minnesota-Duluth
Corey Millen	F	Minnesota
Tony Granato	F	Wisconsin

1985–86
Player	Pos	Team
Tom Allen	G	Denver
Marty Wiitala	D	Wisconsin
Rob Doyle	D	Colorado College
Corey Millen	F	Minnesota
Pat Micheletti	F	Minnesota
Dwight Mathiasen	F	Denver

1986–87
Player	Pos	Team
Mike Richter	G	Wisconsin
Todd Richards	D	Minnesota
Guy Gosselin	D	Minnesota-Duluth
Rick Boh	F	Colorado College
Paul Ranheim	F	Wisconsin
Corey Millen	F	Minnesota
Tony Granato	F	Wisconsin

1987–88
Player	Pos	Team
Dean Anderson	G	Wisconsin
Todd Richards	D	Minnesota
Paul Stanton	D	Wisconsin
Steve Tuttle	F	Wisconsin
John Archibald	F	Michigan Tech
Daryn McBride	F	Denver

1988–89
Player	Pos	Team
Robb Stauber	G	Minnesota
Todd Richards	D	Minnesota
Russ Parent	D	North Dakota
Dave Snuggerud	F	Minnesota
John Byce	F	Wisconsin
Phil Berger	F	Northern Michigan

==== 1990s ====
1989–90
Player	Pos	Team
Duane Derksen	G	Wisconsin
Sean Hill	D	Wisconsin
Jason Herter	D	North Dakota
John Byce	F	Wisconsin
Lee Davidson	F	North Dakota
Eric Murano	F	Denver

1990–91
Player	Pos	Team
Duane Derksen	G	Wisconsin
Jason Herter	D	North Dakota
Sean Hill	D	Wisconsin
Larry Olimb	F	Minnesota
Kelly Hurd	F	Michigan Tech
Dixon Ward	F	North Dakota

1991–92
Player	Pos	Team
Jeff Stolp	G	Minnesota
Travis Richards	D	Minnesota
Doug Zmolek	D	Minnesota
Dixon Ward	F	North Dakota
Derek Plante	F	Minnesota-Duluth
Jim Hiller	F	Northern Michigan

1992–93
Player	Pos	Team
Jim Carey	G	Wisconsin
Jon Rohloff	D	Minnesota-Duluth
Travis Richards	D	Minnesota
Joe Frederick	F	Northern Michigan
John Young	F	Michigan Tech
Chris Marinucci	F	Minnesota-Duluth

1993–94
Player	Pos	Team
Lee Schill	G	Alaska-Anchorage
Kelly Hultgren	D	St. Cloud State
Kent Fearns	D	Colorado College
Mike Harding	F	Northern Michigan
Jeff Nielsen	F	Minnesota
Andrew Shier	F	Wisconsin

1994–95
Player	Pos	Team
Sinuhe Wallinheimo	G	Denver
Kent Fearns	D	Colorado College
Kelly Hultgren	D	St. Cloud State
Brad Federenko	F	Minnesota-Duluth
Peter Geronazzo	F	Colorado College
Colin Schmidt	F	Colorado College

1995–96
Player	Pos	Team
Judd Lambert	G	Colorado College
Scott Swanson	D	Colorado College
Dan Trebil	D	Minnesota
Brian Swanson	F	Colorado College
Colin Schmidt	F	Colorado College
Antti Laaksonen	F	Denver

1996–97
Player	Pos	Team
Kirk Daubenspeck	G	Wisconsin
Eric Rud	D	Colorado College
Rick Mrozik	D	Minnesota-Duluth
Dave Paradise	F	St. Cloud State
Matt Cullen	F	St. Cloud State
Mike Peluso	F	Minnesota-Duluth

1997–98
Player	Pos	Team
Brian Leitza	G	St. Cloud State
Calvin Elfring	D	Colorado College
Andy Sutton	D	Michigan Tech
Steven Reinprecht	F	Wisconsin
Reggie Berg	F	Minnesota
David Hoogsteen	F	North Dakota

1998–99
Player	Pos	Team
Karl Goehring	G	North Dakota
Dan Peters	D	Colorado College
Trevor Hammer	D	North Dakota
Jay Panzer	F	North Dakota
Darren Clark	F	Colorado College
Jeff Panzer	F	North Dakota

==== 2000s ====
1999–00
Player	Pos	Team
Scott Meyer	G	St. Cloud State
Jordan Leopold	D	Minnesota
Dylan Mills	D	Minnesota
Tyler Arnason	F	St. Cloud State
John Pohl	F	Minnesota
Lee Goren	F	North Dakota

2000–01
Player	Pos	Team
Wade Dubielewicz	G	Denver
Duvie Wescott	D	St. Cloud State
Paul Manning	D	Colorado College
Eric Westrum	F	Minnesota
Dany Heatley	F	Wisconsin
Ryan Bayda	F	North Dakota

2001–02
Player	Pos	Team
Dean Weasler	G	St. Cloud State
Matt Shasby	D	Alaska-Anchorage
Paul Martin	D	Minnesota
Ryan Bayda	F	North Dakota
Nate DiCasmirro	F	St. Cloud State
Judd Medak	F	Minnesota-Duluth

2002–03
Player	Pos	Team
Wade Dubielewicz	G	Denver
Paul Martin	D	Minnesota
Keith Ballard	D	Minnesota
Noah Clarke	F	Colorado College
Thomas Vanek	F	Minnesota
Brandon Bochenski	F	North Dakota

2003–04
Player	Pos	Team
Isaac Reichmuth	G	Minnesota-Duluth
Ryan Caldwell	D	Denver
Matt Jones	D	North Dakota
Chris Conner	F	Michigan Tech
Thomas Vanek	F	Minnesota
Evan Schwabe	F	Minnesota-Duluth

2004–05
Player	Pos	Team
Bernd Brückler	G	Wisconsin
Lars Helminen	D	Michigan Tech
Mark Stuart	D	Colorado College
Gabe Gauthier	F	Denver
Evan Schwabe	F	Minnesota-Duluth
Robbie Earl	F	Wisconsin

2005–06
Player	Pos	Team
Brian Elliott	G	Wisconsin
Alex Goligoski	D	Minnesota
Brian Salcido	D	Colorado College
Joe Pavelski	F	Wisconsin
Marty Sertich	F	Colorado College
David Backes	F	Minnesota State

2006–07
Player	Pos	Team
Brian Elliott	G	Wisconsin
Mike Vanelli	D	Minnesota
Taylor Chorney	D	North Dakota
Jonathan Toews	F	North Dakota
Travis Morin	F	Minnesota State
Kyle Okposo	F	Minnesota

2007–08
Player	Pos	Team
Jean-Philippe Lamoureux	G	North Dakota
Chris Butler	D	Denver
Chay Genoway	D	North Dakota
Andreas Nödl	F	St. Cloud State
Ryan Duncan	F	North Dakota
Garrett Roe	F	St. Cloud State

2008–09
Player	Pos	Team
Marc Cheverie	G	Denver
Patrick Wiercioch	D	Denver
Garrett Raboin	D	St. Cloud State
Ryan Duncan	F	North Dakota
Jordan Schroeder	F	Minnesota
Justin Fontaine	F	Minnesota-Duluth

==== 2010s ====
2009–10
Player	Pos	Team
Brad Eidsness	G	North Dakota
Ryan McDonagh	D	Wisconsin
Nate Prosser	D	Colorado College
Justin Fontaine	F	Minnesota-Duluth
Ryan Lasch	F	St. Cloud State
Tyler Ruegsegger	F	Denver

2010–11
Player	Pos	Team
Kent Patterson	G	Minnesota
Jake Gardiner	D	Wisconsin
Matt Donovan	D	Denver
Jason Zucker	F	Denver
Drew Shore	F	Denver
Justin Fontaine	F	Minnesota-Duluth

2011–12
Player	Pos	Team
Kenny Reiter	G	Minnesota-Duluth
Gabe Guentzel	D	Colorado College
Nate Schmidt	D	Minnesota
Jaden Schwartz	F	Colorado College
Drew Shore	F	Denver
Jason Zucker	F	Denver

2012–13
Player	Pos	Team
Juho Olkinuora	G	Denver
Joey LaLeggia	D	Denver
Mike Boivin	D	Colorado College
Corban Knight	F	North Dakota
Erik Haula	F	Minnesota
Rylan Schwartz	F	Colorado College

2013–14
Player	Pos	Team
Cole Huggins	G	Minnesota State
Kevin Czuczman	D	Lake Superior State
Scott Czarnowczan	D	Ferris State
Garrett Thompson	F	Ferris State
Colton Beck	F	Alaska
Jean-Paul Lafontaine	F	Minnesota State

2014–15
Player	Pos	Team
Stephon Williams	G	Minnesota State
Matt Prapavessis	D	Bemidji State
Casey Nelson	D	Minnesota State
Bryce Gervais	F	Minnesota State
Alex Petan	F	Michigan Tech
Malcolm Gould	F	Michigan Tech

2015–16
Player	Pos	Team
Jamie Phillips	G	Michigan Tech
Matt Roy	D	Michigan Tech
Sean Walker	D	Bowling Green
Gerald Mayhew	F	Ferris State
Darren Nowick	F	Northern Michigan
Dominik Shine	F	Northern Michigan

2016–17
Player	Pos	Team
Atte Tolvanen	G	Northern Michigan
Shane Hanna	D	Michigan Tech
Sean Walker	D	Bowling Green
C. J. Franklin	F	Minnesota State
Mitch Hults	F	Lake Superior State
Phillip Marinaccio	F	Bemidji State

2017–18
Player	Pos	Team
Michael Bitzer	G	Bemidji State
Daniel Brickley	D	Minnesota State
Philip Beaulieu	D	Northern Michigan
Mitchell McLain	F	Bowling Green
Adam Rockwood	F	Northern Michigan
Josh Kestner	F	Alabama–Huntsville

2018–19
Player	Pos	Team
Dryden McKay	G	Minnesota State
Justin Baudry	D	Bemidji State
Alec Rauhauser	D	Bowling Green
Brandon Kruse	F	Bowling Green
Adam Rockwood	F	Northern Michigan
Parker Tuomie	F	Minnesota State

==== 2020s ====
2019–20
Player	Pos	Team
Zach Driscoll	G	Bemidji State
Tommy Muck	D	Bemidji State
Philip Beaulieu	D	Northern Michigan
Griffin Loughran	F	Northern Michigan
Parker Tuomie	F	Minnesota State
Max Humitz	F	Lake Superior State

2020–21
Player	Pos	Team
Mareks Mitens	G	Lake Superior State
Colin Swoyer	D	Michigan Tech
Will Riedell	D	Lake Superior State
Joseph Nardi	F	Northern Michigan
Nathan Smith	F	Minnesota State
Ashton Calder	F	Lake Superior State

==== Second Team players by school ====
Final Teams

School	Winners
Michigan Tech	49
Minnesota State	13
Northern Michigan	13
Bemidji State	6
Lake Superior State	6
Bowling Green	5
Ferris State	3
Alaska-Anchorage	2
Alabama–Huntsville	1
Alaska	1

Previous Teams

School	Winners
Minnesota	50
Denver	49
North Dakota	48
Wisconsin	45
Colorado College	42
Minnesota-Duluth	33
Michigan	30
St. Cloud State	14
Michigan State	7
Notre Dame	4

==== Multiple appearances ====
Player	Second Team appearances
Bill Abbott	4
Justin Fontaine	3
Corey Millen	3
Todd Richards	3
many player tied with	2

=== Third Team ===
==== 1990s ====
1995–96
Player	Pos	Team
Teras Lendzyk	G	Minnesota-Duluth
Taj Melson	D	St. Cloud State
Eric Rud	D	Colorado College
Jay McNeill	F	Colorado College
David Vallieres	F	Alaska-Anchorage
Mike Peluso	F	Minnesota-Duluth

1996–97
Player	Pos	Team
Jim Mullin	G	Denver
Dane Litke	D	North Dakota
Calvin Elfring	D	Colorado College
Sacha Molin	F	St. Cloud State
Ryan Kraft	F	Minnesota
Andre Savage	F	Michigan Tech

1997–98
Player	Pos	Team
Doug Taskey	G	Alaska-Anchorage
Josh DeWolf	D	St. Cloud State
Scott Swanson	D	Colorado College
Mike Peluso	F	Minnesota-Duluth
Wyatt Smith	F	Minnesota
Paul Comrie	F	Denver

1998–99
Player	Pos	Team
Graham Melanson	G	Wisconsin
Jordan Leopold	D	Minnesota
Jeff Dessner	D	Wisconsin
Wyatt Smith	F	Minnesota
James Patterson	F	Denver
Lee Goren	F	North Dakota

==== 2000s ====
1999–00
Player	Pos	Team
Graham Melanson	G	Wisconsin
Alex Brooks	D	Wisconsin
Paul Manning	D	Colorado College
Aaron Fox	F	Minnesota State
Jason Ulmer	F	North Dakota
Erik Westrum	F	Minnesota

2000–01
Player	Pos	Team
Adam Hauser	G	Minnesota
Ben Christopherson	D	Minnesota State
Tom Preissing	D	Colorado College
Peter Sejna	F	Colorado College
Mark Hartigan	F	St. Cloud State
Brandon Sampair	F	St. Cloud State

2001–02
Player	Pos	Team
Adam Berkhoel	G	Denver
Tom Preissing	D	Colorado College
Aaron MacKenzie	D	Denver
Jeff Taffe	F	Minnesota
Connor James	F	Denver
Peter Sejna	F	Colorado College

2002–03
Player	Pos	Team
Isaac Reichmuth	G	Minnesota-Duluth
Andy Schneider	D	North Dakota
David Hale	D	North Dakota
Zach Parise	F	North Dakota
Kevin Doell	F	Denver
Troy Riddle	F	Minnesota

2003–04
Player	Pos	Team
Adam Berkhoel	G	Denver
Mark Stuart	D	Colorado College
Ryan Suter	D	Wisconsin
Shane Joseph	F	Minnesota State
Brady Murray	F	North Dakota
Gabe Gauthier	F	Denver

2004–05
Player	Pos	Team
Cam Ellsworth	G	Michigan Tech
Tom Gilbert	D	Wisconsin
Matt Jones	D	North Dakota
David Backes	F	Minnesota State
Ryan Potulny	F	Minnesota
Danny Irmen	F	Minnesota

2005–06
Player	Pos	Team
Jordan Parise	G	North Dakota
Chris Harrington	D	Minnesota
Matt Smaby	D	North Dakota
Drew Stafford	F	North Dakota
Ryan Dingle	F	Denver
Danny Irmen	F	Minnesota

2006–07
Player	Pos	Team
Michael-Lee Teslak	G	Michigan Tech
Lee Sweatt	D	Colorado College
Steve Wagner	D	Minnesota State
Andreas Nödl	F	St. Cloud State
T. J. Oshie	F	North Dakota
Ryan Dingle	F	Denver

2007–08
Player	Pos	Team
Peter Mannino	G	Denver
Robbie Bina	D	North Dakota
Jamie McBain	D	Wisconsin
Tyler Bozak	F	Denver
Blake Wheeler	F	Minnesota
Kyle Turris	F	Wisconsin

2008–09
Player	Pos	Team
Brad Eidsness	G	North Dakota
Josh Meyers	D	Minnesota-Duluth
Kurt Davis	D	Minnesota State
Garrett Roe	F	St. Cloud State
Anthony Maiani	F	Denver
Rhett Rakhshani	F	Denver

==== 2010s ====
2009–10
Player	Pos	Team
Dan Dunn	G	St. Cloud State
Garrett Raboin	D	St. Cloud State
Chay Genoway	D	North Dakota
Michael Davies	F	Wisconsin
Joe Colborne	F	Denver
Garrett Roe	F	St. Cloud State

2010–11
Player	Pos	Team
John Faulkner	G	Nebraska-Omaha
Kurt Davis	D	Minnesota State
Justin Faulk	D	Minnesota-Duluth
Jason Gregoire	F	North Dakota
Jaden Schwartz	F	Colorado College
Drew LeBlanc	F	St. Cloud State

2011–12
Player	Pos	Team
Josh Thorimbert	G	Colorado College
Nick Jensen	D	St. Cloud State
Ben Blood	D	North Dakota
Mark Zengerle	F	Wisconsin
Brock Nelson	F	North Dakota
Travis Oleksuk	F	Minnesota-Duluth

2012–13
Player	Pos	Team
Adam Wilcox	G	Minnesota
Andrej Šustr	D	Nebraska-Omaha
Jake McCabe	D	Wisconsin
Matt Leitner	F	Minnesota State
Nick Bjugstad	F	Minnesota
Eriah Hayes	F	Minnesota State

2013–14
Player	Pos	Team
Kevin Kapalka	G	Lake Superior State
Jason Binkley	D	Ferris State
Matt Prapevessis	D	Bemidji State
Johnny McInnis	F	Minnesota State
Zach Lehrke	F	Minnesota State
Tyler Morley	F	Alaska

2014–15
Player	Pos	Team
C. J. Motte	G	Ferris State
Shane Hanna	D	Michigan Tech
Brock Maschmeyer	D	Northern Michigan
Blake Pietila	F	Michigan Tech
Marcus Basara	F	Alaska
Brendan Harms	F	Bemidji State
Blake Tatchell	F	Alaska-Anchorage

2015–16
Player	Pos	Team
Gordon Defiel	G	Lake Superior State
Brandon Anselmini	D	Ferris State
Shane Hanna	D	Michigan Tech
Mark Cooper	F	Bowling Green
Bryce Gervais	F	Minnesota State
Malcolm Gould	F	Michigan Tech
Tyler Heinonen	F	Michigan Tech

2016–17
Player	Pos	Team
Justin Kapelmaster	G	Ferris State
Mark Friedman	D	Bowling Green
Kurt Gosselin	D	Alabama–Huntsville
Brad McClure	F	Minnesota State
Dominik Shine	F	Northern Michigan
Gerry Fitzgerald	F	Bemidji State
Tyler Heinonen	F	Michigan Tech

2017–18
Player	Pos	Team
Connor LaCouvee	G	Minnesota State
Ian Scheid	D	Minnesota State
Ryker Killins	D	Ferris State
Mitch Reinke	D	Michigan Tech
Zeb Knutson	F	Minnesota State
Darien Craighead	F	Northern Michigan
Robbie Payne	F	Northern Michigan

2018–19
Player	Pos	Team
Ryan Bednard	G	Bowling Green
Connor Mackey	D	Minnesota State
Ian Scheid	D	Minnesota State
Max Humitz	F	Lake Superior State
Steven Jandric	F	Alaska
Anthony Nellis	F	Lake Superior State

==== 2020s ====
2019–20
Player	Pos	Team
Matt Jurusik	G	Michigan Tech
Elias Rosén	D	Bemidji State
Ian Scheid	D	Minnesota State
Connor Ford	F	Bowling Green
Owen Sillinger	F	Bemidji State
Darien Craighead	F	Northern Michigan

2020–21
Player	Pos	Team
Zach Driscoll	G	Bemidji State
Akito Hirose	D	Minnesota State
Riese Zmolek	D	Minnesota State
Trenton Bliss	F	Michigan Tech
André Ghantous	F	Northern Michigan
Pete Veillette	F	Lake Superior State

==== Third Team players by school ====
Final Teams

School	Winners
Minnesota State	21
Michigan Tech	12
Bemidji State	6
Northern Michigan	6
Ferris State	5
Lake Superior State	5
Bowling Green	4
Alaska	3
Alaska-Anchorage	3
Alabama–Huntsville	1

Previous Teams

School	Winners
North Dakota	18
Denver	16
Minnesota	15
Colorado College	13
St. Cloud State	12
Wisconsin	11
Minnesota-Duluth	6
Nebraska-Omaha	2

==== Multiple appearances ====
Player	Third Team appearances
Ryan Dingle	2
Danny Irmen	2
Mike Peluso	2
Tom Preissing	2
Garrett Roe	2
Peter Sejna	2
Ian Scheid	2
Wyatt Smith	2

=== Rookie Team ===
==== 1990s ====
1990–91
Player	Pos	Team
Jamie Ram	G	Michigan Tech
Chris McAlpine	D	Minnesota
Shawn Reid	D	Colorado College
Tony Szabo	F	Northern Michigan
Jason Zent	F	Wisconsin
Craig Johnson	F	Minnesota

1991–92
Player	Pos	Team
Corwin Saurdiff	G	Northern Michigan
Jason Helr	D	Northern Michigan
Kent Fearns	D	Colorado College
Brian Rafalski	D	Wisconsin
Sandy Gasseau	F	St. Cloud State
Steve Magnusson	F	Minnesota
Darby Hendrickson	F	Minnesota

1992–93
Player	Pos	Team
Jim Carey	G	Wisconsin
Jason Wright	D	Michigan Tech
Nick Naumenko	D	North Dakota
Brian Bonin	F	Minnesota
Jay McNeill	F	Colorado College
Pat Mikesch	F	Michigan Tech

1993–94
Player	Pos	Team
Toby Kvalevog	G	North Dakota
Todd Bethard	D	Alaska-Anchorage
Eric Rud	D	Colorado College
Brad Federenko	F	Minnesota-Duluth
Landon Wilson	F	North Dakota
Dean Seymour	F	Northern Michigan

1994–95
Player	Pos	Team
Brian Leitza	G	St. Cloud State
Mike Crowley	D	Minnesota
Calvin Elfring	D	Colorado College
Joe Bianchi	F	Wisconsin
Mike Peluso	F	Minnesota-Duluth
Ryan Kraft	F	Minnesota

1995–96
Player	Pos	Team
Steve DeBus	G	Minnesota
Scott Swanson	D	Colorado College
Darrin Bradley	D	Alaska-Anchorage
Brian Swanson	F	Colorado College
Matt Cullen	F	St. Cloud State
Erik Rasmussen	F	Minnesota

1996–97
Player	Pos	Team
Brant Nicklin	G	Minnesota-Duluth
Ben Clymer	D	Minnesota
Curtis Doell	D	Minnesota-Duluth
Buddy Smith	F	Northern Michigan
Dave Spehar	F	Minnesota
Toby Petersen	F	Colorado College

1997–98
Player	Pos	Team
Karl Goehring	G	North Dakota
Trevor Hammer	D	North Dakota
Ryan Coole	D	Minnesota-Duluth
Paul Manning	D	Colorado College
Kevin Granato	F	Wisconsin
Mark Rycroft	F	Denver
Jeff Panzer	F	North Dakota

1998–99
Player	Pos	Team
Gregg Naumenko	G	Alaska-Anchorage
Jordan Leopold	D	Minnesota
David Tanabe	D	Wisconsin
Steve Cygan	F	Alaska-Anchorage
Jesse Heerema	F	Colorado College
Tyler Arnason	F	St. Cloud State

==== 2000s ====
1999–00
Player	Pos	Team
Corey McEachern	G	Alaska-Anchorage
Travis Roche	D	North Dakota
Brian Fahey	D	Wisconsin
Dany Heatley	F	Wisconsin
Noah Clarke	F	Colorado College
Ryan Bayda	F	North Dakota

2000–01
Player	Pos	Team
Chris King	G	Alaska-Anchorage
Ryan Caldwell	D	Denver
Paul Martin	D	Minnesota
Peter Sejna	F	Colorado College
Grant Potulny	F	Minnesota
Troy Riddle	F	Minnesota

2001–02
Player	Pos	Team
Bernd Brückler	G	Wisconsin
Keith Ballard	D	Minnesota
Matt Gens	D	St. Cloud State
Mike Doyle	F	St. Cloud State
Brandon Bochenski	F	North Dakota
Peter Szabo	F	St. Cloud State

2002–03
Player	Pos	Team
Isaac Reichmuth	G	Minnesota-Duluth
Mark Stuart	D	Colorado College
Chris Harrington	D	Minnesota
Thomas Vanek	F	Minnesota
Zach Parise	F	North Dakota
Brett Sterling	F	Colorado College

2003–04
Player	Pos	Team
Matt Zaba	G	Colorado College
Ryan Suter	D	Wisconsin
Matt Carle	D	Denver
Brady Murray	F	North Dakota
David Backes	F	Minnesota State
Robbie Earl	F	Wisconsin

2004–05
Player	Pos	Team
Nathan Lawson	G	Alaska-Anchorage
Alex Goligoski	D	Minnesota
Kyle Klubertanz	D	Wisconsin
Joe Pavelski	F	Wisconsin
Paul Stastny	F	Denver
Travis Zajac	F	North Dakota

2005–06
Player	Pos	Team
Dan Tormey	G	Minnesota State
Chris Butler	D	Denver
Brian Lee	D	North Dakota
Phil Kessel	F	Minnesota
T. J. Oshie	F	North Dakota
Mason Raymond	F	Minnesota-Duluth

2006–07
Player	Pos	Team
Alex Stalock	G	Minnesota-Duluth
Erik Johnson	D	Minnesota
Jamie McBain	D	Wisconsin
Andreas Nödl	F	St. Cloud State
Kyle Okposo	F	Minnesota
Ryan Lasch	F	St. Cloud State

2007–08
Player	Pos	Team
Richard Bachman	G	Colorado College
Ryan McDonagh	D	Wisconsin
Cade Fairchild	D	Minnesota
Kyle Turris	F	Wisconsin
Tyler Bozak	F	Denver
Garrett Roe	F	St. Cloud State

2008–09
Player	Pos	Team
Brad Eidsness	G	North Dakota
Patrick Wiercioch	D	Denver
Jake Gardiner	D	Wisconsin
Jordan Schroeder	F	Minnesota
Joe Colborne	F	Denver
Mike Connolly	F	Minnesota-Duluth

==== 2010s ====
2009–10
Player	Pos	Team
Joe Howe	G	Colorado College
Matt Donovan	D	Denver
Justin Schultz	D	Wisconsin
Danny Kristo	F	North Dakota
Craig Smith	F	Wisconsin
Rylan Schwartz	F	Colorado College

2010–11
Player	Pos	Team
Sam Brittain	G	Denver
Justin Faulk	D	Minnesota-Duluth
David Makowski	D	Denver
Jason Zucker	F	Denver
Jaden Schwartz	F	Colorado College
J. T. Brown	F	Minnesota-Duluth

2011–12
Player	Pos	Team
Juho Olkinuora	G	Denver
Joey LaLeggia	D	Denver
Andrew Prochno	D	St. Cloud State
Kyle Rau	F	Minnesota
Jean-Paul Lafontaine	F	Minnesota State
Jayson Megna	F	Nebraska-Omaha

2012–13
Player	Pos	Team
Stephin Williams	G	Minnesota State
Nolan Zajac	D	Denver
Andy Welinski	D	Minnesota-Duluth
Tony Cameranesi	F	Minnesota-Duluth
Alex Petan	F	Michigan Tech
Rocco Grimaldi	F	North Dakota

2013–14
Player	Pos	Team
Cole Huggins	G	Minnesota State
Sean Flanagan	D	Minnesota State
Ruslan Pedan	D	Bemidji State
Shane Hanna	D	Michigan Tech
Kyle Schempp	F	Ferris State
Marcus Basara	F	Alaska
Alex Globke	F	Lake Superior State

2014–15
Player	Pos	Team
Michael Bitzer	G	Bemidji State
Mark Friedman	D	Bowling Green
Nolan Valleau	D	Bowling Green
Brandon Hawkins	F	Bowling Green
C. J. Franklin	F	Minnesota State
Max McHugh	F	Alabama-Huntsville

2015–16
Player	Pos	Team
Atte Tolvanen	G	Northern Michigan
Wyatt Ege	D	Alaska Anchorage
Daniel Brickley	D	Minnesota State
Corey Mackin	F	Ferris State
Max Coatta	F	Minnesota State
Jake Lucchini	F	Michigan Tech

2016–17
Player	Pos	Team
Angus Redmond	G	Michigan Tech
Ian Scheid	D	Minnesota State
Alec Rauhauser	D	Bowling Green
Mitch Reinke	D	Michigan Tech
Zach Whitecloud	D	Bemidji State
Marc Michaelis	F	Minnesota State
Darien Craighead	F	Northern Michigan
Max Humitz	F	Lake Superior State

2017–18
Player	Pos	Team
Eric Dop	G	Bowling Green
Connor Mackey	D	Minnesota State
Eric Sinclair	D	Alaska Anchorage
Jake Jaremko	F	Minnesota State
Brandon Kruse	F	Bowling Green
Steven Jandric	F	Alaska
Max Johnson	F	Bowling Green
Reggie Lutz	F	Minnesota State

2018–19
Player	Pos	Team
Dryden McKay	G	Minnesota State
Chris Jandric	D	Alaska
Cooper Zech	D	Ferris State
Ashton Calder	F	Minnesota State
Brian Halonen	F	Michigan Tech
Julian Napravnik	F	Minnesota State
Owen Sillinger	F	Bemidji State

==== 2020s ====
2019–20
Player	Pos	Team
John Hawthorne	G	Northern Michigan
Elias Rosén	D	Bemidji State
Jake Willets	D	Ferris State
Lucas Sowder	F	Minnesota State
Louis Boudon	F	Lake Superior State
Nathan Smith	F	Minnesota State

2020–21
Player	Pos	Team
Rico DiMatteo	G	Northern Michigan
Akito Hirose	D	Minnesota State
Jake Livingstone	D	Minnesota State
Arvid Caderoth	F	Michigan Tech
Lukas Sillinger	F	Bemidji State
Tyrone Bronte	F	Alabama–Huntsville

==== Rookie Team players by school ====
Final Teams

School	Winners
Minnesota State	21
Michigan Tech	10
Alaska-Anchorage	9
Northern Michigan	9
Bowling Green	7
Bemidji State	6
Ferris State	4
Alaska	3
Lake Superior State	3
Alabama–Huntsville	2

Previous Teams

School	Winners
Minnesota	25
Colorado College	19
Wisconsin	19
North Dakota	17
Denver	15
Minnesota-Duluth	13
St. Cloud State	11

== See also ==
- WCHA Hockey Awards
