= Al McLean (ice hockey) =

Canadian ice hockey player

- Born: August 3, 1939 (age 87) New Westminster, British Columbia, Canada
- Height: 5 ft 8 in (173 cm)
- Weight: 172 lb (78 kg; 12 st 4 lb)
- Position: centre
- Played for: North Dakota; Vancouver Canucks
- NHL draft: Undrafted
- Playing career: 1961–1968

Alan McLean is a Canadian retired ice hockey Center who was an All-American for North Dakota and was the Most Outstanding Player of the 1963 NCAA Tournament.

== Career ==
McLean made a name for himself as a junior player for the Melville Millionaires. He was recruited to North Dakota in 1960 and began playing with the varsity club the following season. McLean led a fairly weak Fighting Sioux squad in goals (19), assists (19) and points (38) but the team finished 5th in the WCHA and was left out of the conference tournament. The following year the team coalesced around a core of upperclassmen with McLean again leading the team in scoring. This time UND tied Denver for the regular season WCHA title and McLean was on both All-WCHA First Team and an All-American. The fighting Sioux swept aside defending national champion Michigan Tech in the semifinal and, though they fell to the Pioneers in the final, UND had already earned a bid to the 1963 NCAA Tournament.

North Dakota dominated Boston College in the semifinal, winning 8–2 and found themselves facing Denver once more for the national championship. UND got off to a blistering start, scoring 5 goals in the first period and led 5-2 after 20 minutes. McLean scored his second goal of the game 5 minutes into the second and then the team held on for dear life as Denver attempted to erase the Fighting Sioux's advantage. The Pioneers scored three timed before the end of the match but they couldn't get the equalizer and McLean's tally held up as the game-winner. McLean was named as the Tournament Most Outstanding Player.

McLean left UND after the season to play for the Canadian National Team and traveled to the 1964 Winter Olympic Games in Innsbruck, Austria but did not see ice time due to an injury. He finished out his college career playing closer to home with the UBC Thunderbirds and later briefly appeared for the Vancouver Canucks before retiring. He was inducted into the North Dakota Letterwinners Hall of Fame in 1997.

== Career statistics ==
=== Regular season and playoffs ===
			Regular Season					Playoffs
Season	Team	League	GP	G	A	Pts	PIM	GP	G	A	Pts	PIM
1958–59	Melville Millionaires	SJHL	38	21	26	47	20	—	—	—	—	—
1959–60	Melville Millionaires	SJHL	37	22	17	39	23	—	—	—	—	—
1961–62	North Dakota	WCHA	26	19	19	38	19	—	—	—	—	—
1962–63	North Dakota	WCHA	32	19	34	53	53	—	—	—	—	—
1963–64	Canadian National Team	International	—	—	—	—	—	—	—	—	—	—
1964–65	British Columbia	CIAU	—	—	—	—	—	—	—	—	—	—
1967–68	Vancouver Canucks	WHL	3	0	1	1	2	—	—	—	—	—
SJHL Totals			75	43	43	86	43	—	—	—	—	—
NCAA Totals			58	38	53	91	72	—	—	—	—	—

== Awards and honors ==
Award	Year
All-WCHA First Team	1962–63
AHCA West All-American	1962–63
NCAA All-Tournament First Team	1963

Awards and achievements
Preceded by Lou Angotti	NCAA Tournament Most Outstanding Player; 1963	Succeeded by Bob Gray
