= Don Ross (ice hockey) =

American ice hockey player

- Born: October 11, 1942 (age 83) Roseau, Minnesota, U.S.
- Height: 6 ft 0 in (183 cm)
- Weight: 211 lb (96 kg; 15 st 1 lb)
- Position: Defense
- Played for: North Dakota
- NHL draft: Undrafted
- Playing career: 1961–1965

Donald Francis Ross (born October 11, 1942) is an American former ice hockey player.

== Early life ==
Ross was born in Roseau, Minnesota. He was a member of the North Dakota Fighting Hawks men's ice hockey team from 1961 to 1965.

== Career ==
Ross played at the 1964 Winter Olympics and 1968 Winter Olympics for the United States National Team in the ice hockey tournament, finishing fifth. He is a member of the University of North Dakota Letterwinners Association Hall of Fame.

== Awards and honors ==
Award	Year
All-WCHA First Team	1962–63
AHCA West All-American	1962–63
NCAA All-Tournament First Team	1963
All-WCHA First Team	1964–65
AHCA West All-American	1964–65
