= Bill Staub =

Canadian ice hockey player

- Born: May 12, 1941 (age 85) Winnipeg, Manitoba, Canada
- Height: 5 ft 9 in (175 cm)
- Weight: 176 lb (80 kg; 12 st 8 lb)
- Position: Left wing
- Shot: Left
- Played for: Denver; Jacksonville Rockets; Providence Reds; Houston Apollos; Quebec Aces; Fort Wayne Komets; Dayton Gems; Toledo Hornets; Greensboro Generals
- NHL draft: Undrafted
- Playing career: 1961–1976

William M. Staub is a Canadian retired ice hockey left winger who was an All-American for Denver.

== Career ==
Staub joined the varsity team at Denver in 1961, after the program had won consecutive national championships. A great many players had left after the 1961 title and the team regressed slightly in Staub's first season. Denver finished third in the WCHA tournament and missed out on the NCAA Tournament. The following season, Murray Armstrong's team rebounded and finished atop the conference with Staub leading the club in scoring. He was named an All-American and an All-WCHA First Teamer and helped the Pioneers capture the conference championship. Denver made the championship game that season, however, the team could not overcome a huge first period by North Dakota and fell 5–6.

For his senior season, Staub was named team co-captain and led the team to a second-place finish in the WCHA. The Pioneers upset top-seeded Michigan and earned the #1 spot for the NCAA Tournament. After defeating Rensselaer in the semifinal, Denver and Michigan met for a rematch in the title game and this time the Wolverines came out on top. Despite failing to score in the final match, Staub was named to the All-Tournament First Team.

After graduating, Staub continued his playing career. He started with a season of senior hockey and led the Jacksonville Rockets in scoring. After that strong showing he joined the Houston Apollos, a minor professional team and ended up playing in the American Hockey League over parts of two seasons. Staub, however, couldn't keep up his scoring numbers in the AHL and transferred to the IHL in 1968. He spent six seasons in the second-tier minor league, winning a Turner Cup with the Dayton Gems in 1970. He retired in 1976 after a short stint with the Greensboro Generals.

== Career statistics ==
=== Regular season and playoffs ===
			Regular Season					Playoffs
Season	Team	League	GP	G	A	Pts	PIM	GP	G	A	Pts	PIM
1961–62	University of Denver	WCHA	30	19	18	37	2	—	—	—	—	—
1962–63	University of Denver	WCHA	32	20	24	44	10	—	—	—	—	—
1963–64	University of Denver	WCHA	31	23	21	44	2	—	—	—	—	—
1964–65	Jacksonville Rockets	EHL	72	27	46	73	22	—	—	—	—	—
1965–66	Houston Apollos	CPHL	27	6	5	11	0	—	—	—	—	—
1965–66	Quebec Aces	AHL	1	0	0	0	0	—	—	—	—	—
1965–66	Providence Reds	AHL	32	4	15	19	2	—	—	—	—	—
1966–67	Providence Reds	AHL	24	3	4	7	2	—	—	—	—	—
1968–69	Columbus Checkers	IHL	35	12	23	35	14	—	—	—	—	—
1968–69	Fort Wayne Komets	IHL	32	19	22	41	12	—	—	—	—	—
1969–70	Dayton Gems	IHL	59	19	33	52	14	13	3	11	14	2
1970–71	Dayton Gems	IHL	57	22	30	52	8	10	3	3	6	0
1971–72	Toledo Hornets	IHL	58	18	25	43	8	—	—	—	—	—
1972–73	Toledo Hornets	IHL	72	23	34	57	8	—	—	—	—	—
1973–74	Toledo Hornets	IHL	58	18	25	43	8	13	3	1	4	2
1975–76	Greensboro Generals	SHL	13	4	5	9	0	—	—	—	—	—
NCAA totals			93	62	63	125	14	—	—	—	—	—
AHL totals			57	7	19	26	4	—	—	—	—	—
IHL totals			387	134	199	333	70	26	7	17	24	4

== Awards and honors ==
Award	Year
All-WCHA First Team	1962–63
AHCA West All-American	1962–63
All-WCHA First Team	1963–64
NCAA All-Tournament First Team	1964
