= W. Godfrey Wood =

Wyllys Godfrey Wood (born 1941, in Brookline, Massachusetts) is an American entrepreneur and sports executive. The son of Wimbledon champion Sidney Wood, Wood studied at Milton Academy and later Harvard University, where he graduated in 1963 and played for the Crimson hockey team. Wood started the Hartford Whalers and the Portland Pirates hockey teams.

== Hockey career ==
Wood still holds the collegiate season record for lowest goals against average (1.27 GAA, in 1962), as a goalie for Harvard's hockey team. His save percentage of .945 ranks second in all-time NCAA standings (only .001 behind .946). He was the last player cut from the United States team that would play the 1964 Winter Olympics. In 1965, signed with the Detroit Red Wings and played for their farm team, the Memphis Wings. In addition to serving as the team's backup goaltender, he was the team's director of public relations. His roommate was future NHL coach Pat Quinn. He was released after he wrote an opinion piece criticizing the state of amateur hockey.

During the 1960s, he was an emergency goaltender for the Boston Bruins. While living in New York City, he played for the amateur St. Nicholas Hockey Club in New York City. He attempted a comeback in 1983, trying out for the U.S. Olympic hockey team.

== Businesses ==
After his hockey career ended, Wood worked for Estabrook & Co., a Boston investment company. By 1982, he was a property counselor and broker for the Boston-based real estate firm Land-Vest. He served for 15 years as president and CEO of the Portland Regional Chamber of Commerce.

In 1971, Wood was one of the founding partners of a World Hockey Association franchise based in New England, along with Howard Baldwin, John Colburn, William Barnes, Robert Schmertz, and John Giordano. Originally known as New England Whalers upon its inception in 1972, the franchise would later be renamed Hartford Whalers when joining the National Hockey League in 1979.

On September 25, 1985, Wood was part of a group that agreed to purchase the NHL's Boston Bruins and the Boston Garden for $50 million. Wood was slated to take over as team president while James F. Brennan would manage the business end. On October 30, 1985, Brennan announced that the deal was "the deal is dead in the water" due to dispute with owner Delaware North over concessions.

In 1990, Wood was front man for future Boston Red Sox owner John W. Henry’s unsuccessful Miami expansion bid in the NHL (where the league instead awarded a franchise to Tampa). Wood owned the Nashville Knights of the East Coast Hockey League for several years in the early 1990s. In 1993, he partnered with Tom Ebright, owner of the American Hockey League’s Baltimore Skipjacks, to move that franchise to Portland, Maine’s Cumberland County Civic Center, and served for three years as general manager of the Portland Pirates. In 1995, Wood created the Roller Hockey International's New England Stingers, who lasted only one season.

He was president of Penguins Attractions, a sports merchandising and holding company in Falmouth, Massachusetts that was affiliated with the Pittsburgh Penguins.

== Family ==
Wood's father Sidney won the 1931 Wimbledon Championships, and was later president of a gold mine concern in New York, while his stepfather retired as president of the National Association of Independent Schools in Boston. He has been married three times: to Kate Pillsbury (whose family then owned the Pillsbury Company), with whom he had daughter, Whitney, and divorced in 1974; to Deborah Chapin Gray (d. 2005) mother of his children Sidney and Amanda; and since 2008 to Karen Rajotte, publisher of the Portland Phoenix.
