= Winter Sports Building =

Ice rink in Grand Forks, North Dakota

- The Old Barn
- Location: Grand Forks, ND 58202
- Owner: University of North Dakota
- Operator: University of North Dakota

Construction
- Opened: 1936 (89–90 years ago)
- Closed: 1972 (53–54 years ago)
- Demolished: 1978

Tenants
- North Dakota ice hockey (1936-1972); Grand Forks Flames (1967-1970)

The Winter Sports Building (known locally as The Barn or The Old Barn) was an indoor ice rink on the campus if the University of North Dakota in Grand Forks, North Dakota. The arena was one of the first indoor college facilities but began to show its age in the 1960s and was eventually replaced by the original Ralph Engelstad Arena in 1972 and then demolished in 1978.

== History ==
The Stadium was funded by and built under the direction of the Works Progress Administration, a program instituted by President Franklin D. Roosevelt as a means to rebuild the economy during the Great Depression. The Winter Sports Building was finished in 1936 for a total cost of $46,000 and was initially used by many UND programs, including the track and football teams. During the Second World War the army used it to help train troops and once the hockey team returned in the mid-1940s the building was converted into a full-time rink.

With raucous crowds routinely nearing 4,000 and artificial ice installed in 1953 the Barn was initially a selling point for the program but as the years passed and many more universities built their own state-of-the-art facilities the leaking roof, lack of heating and chicken wire fencing that surrounded the rink became liabilities. Eventually the university raised enough money to fund the building of a new arena in 1972. After the hockey team moved into the Winter Sports Center the Old Barn was used as storage space before being demolished in 1978.
