= Bob Murray (ice hockey, born 1948) =

Canadian ice hockey player (born 1948)

- Born: July 16, 1948 (age 78) Peterborough, Ontario, Canada
- Height: 6 ft 1 in (185 cm)
- Weight: 194 lb (88 kg; 13 st 12 lb)
- Position: Defence
- Shot: Right
- Played for: Atlanta Flames; Vancouver Canucks
- Playing career: 1971–1977

Robert John Murray (born July 16, 1948) is a Canadian former professional ice hockey defenceman. He played 194 games for the Atlanta Flames and Vancouver Canucks of the National Hockey League between 1973 and 1977. Prior to turning professional Murray played for Michigan Tech, and also spent time in the minor American Hockey League and Central Hockey League.

== Early life ==
Murray was born in Peterborough, Ontario. After playing four seasons at Michigan Tech, where he was named a WCHA First All-Star and NCAA West First All-American in 1971, Murray was signed as a territorial exemption by the Montreal Canadiens in September 1971.

== Career ==
Murray played two seasons in the AHL for the Nova Scotia Voyageurs, the Canadiens' affiliate. Prior to the 1973–74 NHL season he was traded for a third-round draft pick to the Atlanta Flames, where he played one and a half seasons before being traded again to the Vancouver Canucks for Gerry Meehan, March 9, 1975.

He played 194 NHL games with the Flames and Canucks. After the 1976–77 season he began playing in Germany, where he played another 11 years of professional hockey.

== Personal life ==
His younger brother, Jim Murray, was selected by the New York Islanders in the 16th round (226th overall) of the 1974 NHL amateur draft, but never played in the NHL.

== Career statistics ==
=== Regular season and playoffs ===
			Regular season					Playoffs
Season	Team	League	GP	G	A	Pts	PIM	GP	G	A	Pts	PIM
1966–67	Peterborough Petes	OHA	48	3	9	12	32	6	0	0	0	0
1967–68	Michigan Tech	WCHA	—	—	—	—	—	—	—	—	—	—
1968–69	Michigan Tech	WCHA	31	2	13	15	43	—	—	—	—	—
1969–70	Michigan Tech	WCHA	32	3	12	15	61	—	—	—	—	—
1970–71	Michigan Tech	WCHA	32	6	19	25	67	—	—	—	—	—
1971–72	Nova Scotia Voyageurs	AHL	73	1	12	13	62	15	3	0	3	10
1972–73	Nova Scotia Voyageurs	AHL	60	4	22	26	61	13	1	5	6	29
1973–74	Atlanta Flames	NHL	62	0	3	3	34	4	1	0	1	2
1974–75	Atlanta Flames	NHL	42	3	3	6	22	—	—	—	—	—
1974–75	Vancouver Canucks	NHL	13	1	5	6	8	5	0	1	1	13
1975–76	Vancouver Canucks	NHL	65	2	5	7	28	1	0	0	0	0
1976–77	Vancouver Canucks	NHL	12	0	0	0	6	—	—	—	—	—
1976–77	Tulsa Oilers	CHL	58	5	16	21	46	9	1	0	1	14
AHL totals			133	5	34	39	123	28	4	5	9	39
NHL totals			194	6	16	22	98	10	1	1	2	15

== Awards and honours ==
Award	Year
All-WCHA First Team	1970–71
AHCA West All-American	1970–71

Awards and achievements
Preceded by Murray McLachlan	WCHA Most Valuable Player; 1970–71	Succeeded by Doug Palazzari
