= John Jagger =

John Jagger may refer to:

- John Jagger (MP), British trade unionist and politician
- John Jagger (ice hockey), Canadian ice hockey player
- John William Jagger, South African businessman and politician
