= Don Thompson (ice hockey) =

Canadian ice hockey player

- Born: February 4, 1949 (age 77) Toronto, Ontario, Canada
- Height: 5 ft 5 in (165 cm)
- Weight: 150 lb (68 kg; 10 st 10 lb)
- Position: Forward
- Played for: Michigan State; New Haven Nighthawks
- NHL draft: Undrafted
- Playing career: 1969–1975

Donald Thompson is a Canadian retired ice hockey forward who was an All-American for Michigan State.

== Career ==
Thompson briefly played for the Niagara Falls Flyers in 1968–69 but soon left the team so he could register as a freshman at Michigan State University. In doing so, he would be able to count the year as his freshman season and begin to play as a sophomore on the varsity squad in 1970. Shortly after Thompson joined Michigan State, the NCAA changed its long-standing police to limit student athletes to three seasons of varsity play. Beginning with the 1969–70 season, all incoming players had four years of eligibility. As a consequence, when Thompson was named as the WCHA Sophomore of the Year for 1970, he was the final player to receive that award.

Despite the lost season, Thompson became a standout player for the Spartans in the early-1970s. He led the team in scoring in each of his three seasons with the club and was named an All-American in 1971. As a senior, he finished sixth in the nation in scoring. When Thompson graduated he was the Sparta's all-time leading scorer, however, nearly all of his records were surpassed due to the deluge of scoring that occurred in the mid-1970s.

After college, Thompson played senior hockey briefly before becoming a beneficiary of the rapid expansion of professional hockey. Due to both the NHL's and WHA's demand for players, Thompson was able to sign a professional contract with the New Haven Nighthawks. He played parts of two seasons with the team, providing depth scoring and helping them reach the second round in 1974.

== Career statistics ==
=== Regular season and playoffs ===
			Regular Season					Playoffs
Season	Team	League	GP	G	A	Pts	PIM	GP	G	A	Pts	PIM
1966–67	Etobicoke Indians	MJBHL	—	—	—	—	—	—	—	—	—	—
1968–69	Niagara Falls Flyers	OHA	5	2	3	5	0	—	—	—	—	—
1969–70	Michigan State	WCHA	24	14	18	32	24	—	—	—	—	—
1970–71	Michigan State	WCHA	31	19	38	57	35	—	—	—	—	—
1971–72	Michigan State	WCHA	35	32	35	67	66	—	—	—	—	—
1972–73	Clinton Comets	EHL	5	2	3	5	2	—	—	—	—	—
1972–73	New Haven Nighthawks	AHL	33	2	12	14	8	—	—	—	—	—
1973–74	New Haven Nighthawks	AHL	61	9	17	26	14	10	4	1	5	2
1974–75	Peoria Blades	CnHL	—	0	4	4	2	—	—	—	—	—
NCAA totals			90	65	91	156	125	—	—	—	—	—
AHL totals			94	11	29	40	22	10	4	1	5	2

== Awards and honors ==
Award	Year
All-WCHA First Team	1970–71
AHCA West All-American	1970–71
All-WCHA Second Team	1971–72

Awards and achievements
Preceded by George Morrison	WCHA Sophomore of the Year; 1969–70	Succeeded by Award Discontinued
