= 1969–70 NCAA University Division men's ice hockey season =

- Duration: November 1969– March 21, 1970
- NCAA tournament: 1970
- National championship: Olympic Arena; Lake Placid, New York
- NCAA champion: Cornell

The 1969–70 NCAA University Division men's ice hockey season began in November 1969 and concluded with the 1970 NCAA University Division Men's Ice Hockey Tournament's championship game on March 21, 1970, at the Olympic Arena in Lake Placid, New York. This was the 23rd season in which an NCAA ice hockey championship was held and is the 76th year overall where an NCAA school fielded a team.

In 1969 the NCAA changed their bylaws to permit freshman to play on the Varsity team. Beginning with this season universities were permitted to not only have first-year students play for their teams but to also have said players earn letters for four seasons rather than the previous limit of three. As a consequence the WCHA offered both a Sophomore-of-the-Year and Freshman-of-the-Year awards with the previous being formally retired following the campaign.

Cornell finished the 1969–70 season with an undefeated record of 29–0, only the second flawless campaign in the modern history of Division I ice hockey. The previous unblemished season (Clarkson in 1955–56), however, came with a caveat as 8 Golden Knight players were 4-year seniors (a violation of NCAA regulations at the time). As a result, the Clarkson team declined to play in the NCAA tournament. Cornell's undefeated team had no such issues and was able to compete in, and win, both their conference tournament and the NCAA tournament to become the first and thus far only undefeated NCAA champion (as of 2022).

== Season Outlook ==
=== Pre-season conference polls ===
Conference pre-season polls as voted on by coaches. The ECAC coaches voted on the top 10 teams instead of the entire conference.

ECAC Poll
Rank	Team
1	Cornell
2	Harvard
3	Boston University
4	Clarkson
5	Boston College
6	St. Lawrence
7	New Hampshire
8	Yale
9	Brown
10	Rensselaer

WCHA Poll
Rank	Team
1	Denver
2	Michigan Tech
3	North Dakota
4	Michigan
5	Minnesota Duluth
6	Wisconsin
7	Minnesota
8	Michigan State
9	Colorado College

== Regular season ==
=== Season tournaments ===
Tournament	Dates	Teams	Champion
Christmas City of the North Tournament	November 27–28	4	Michigan Tech
Cleveland Cup Tournament	December 17–19	6	Bowling Green
ECAC Christmas Hockey Tournament	December 19–20	4	Harvard
Great Lakes Invitational	December 19–20	4	New Hampshire
Big Ten Holiday Tournament	December 21–23	4	Wisconsin
ECAC Holiday Hockey Festival	December 22–23	4	Cornell
St. Louis Invitational	December 28–29	4	Wisconsin
Boston Arena Christmas Tournament	December 29–30	4	Boston University
Syracuse Invitational	January 2–3	4	Cornell
Rensselaer Holiday Tournament	January 2–4	4	Providence
Beanpot	February 2, 9	4	Boston University

=== Standings ===
1969–70 Big Ten standings
	Conference							Overall					
	GP	W	L	T	PTS	GF	GA	GP	W	L	T	GF	GA
Minnesota†	12	8	4	0	16	48	41	33	21	12	0	122	112
Wisconsin	12	6	6	0	12	49	36	34	23	11	0	151	98
Michigan	12	5	7	0	10	47	53	30	14	16	0	133	122
Michigan State	12	5	7	0	10	40	49	29	13	16	0	112	124
† indicates conference regular season champion

1969–70 ECAC Hockey standings
	Conference							Overall					
	GP	W	L	T	Pct.	GF	GA	GP	W	L	T	GF	GA
Cornell†*	21	21	0	0	1.000	142	39	29	29	0	0	179	56
Clarkson	17	14	3	0	.824	87	51	32	24	8	0	171	107
Boston University	22	17	5	0	.773	120	67	27	20	7	0	149	82
Harvard	20	14	6	0	.700	116	62	25	16	9	0	145	92
Brown	21	14	6	1	.690	104	70	24	15	8	1	117	81
Boston College	21	14	7	0	.667	116	86	26	16	10	0	143	116
New Hampshire	17	9	6	2	.588	98	73	31	19	10	2	172	120
Colgate	17	7	7	3	.500	65	69	24	14	7	3	117	86
St. Lawrence	17	8	9	0	.471	75	83	26	11	15	0	112	124
Providence	19	7	10	2	.421	65	85	25	11	12	2	89	107
Army	13	5	8	0	.385	32	50	25	13	12	0	72	79
Yale	22	6	16	0	.273	65	107	24	6	18	0	68	113
Dartmouth	19	5	14	0	.263	80	121	24	9	15	0	101	142
Princeton	21	5	15	1	.262	65	132	23	5	17	1	68	139
Rensselaer	17	3	13	1	.206	54	103	24	8	15	1	85	128
Pennsylvania	15	3	12	0	.200	46	80	24	8	16	0	88	114
Northeastern	17	1	16	0	.059	51	105	23	3	20	0	80	138
Championship: Cornell † indicates conference regular season champion * indicates conference tournament champion

1969–70 Independent College Athletic Conference standings
	Conference							Overall					
	GP	W	L	T	PTS	GF	GA	GP	W	L	T	GF	GA
Clarkson†	4	4	0	0	8	21	11	32	24	8	0	171	107
Rensselaer	4	1	3	0	2	16	21	24	8	15	1	85	128
St. Lawrence	4	1	3	0	2	14	19	26	11	15	0	112	124
† indicates conference regular season champion

1969–70 NCAA University Division Independent ice hockey standings
	Conference							Overall					
	GP	W	L	T	PTS	GF	GA	GP	W	L	T	GF	GA
Air Force	0	0	0	0	-	-	-	29	11	17	1	120	133
Alaska–Fairbanks	0	0	0	0	-	-	-	12	4	7	1	-	-
Notre Dame	0	0	0	0	-	-	-	30	21	8	1	186	108
Ohio State	0	0	0	0	-	-	-	27	19	7	1	178	82

1969–70 Western Collegiate Hockey Association standings
	Conference							Overall					
	GP	W	L	T	PCT	GF	GA	GP	W	L	T	GF	GA
Minnesota†	26	18	8	0	.692	106	86	33	21	12	0	122	112
Denver	22	13	8	1	.614	96	78	32	21	10	1	153	107
Michigan Tech*	22	12	7	3	.614	98	79	34	19	12	3	148	127
Wisconsin*	22	12	10	0	.545	84	72	34	23	11	0	151	98
North Dakota	26	12	13	1	.481	98	114	30	14	15	1	115	131
Michigan	24	11	13	0	.458	106	104	30	14	16	0	133	122
Michigan State	22	10	12	0	.455	86	92	29	13	16	0	112	124
Minnesota-Duluth	24	10	13	1	.438	89	93	29	13	15	1	118	107
Colorado College	20	3	17	0	.150	70	115	30	7	22	1	117	154
Championship: Michigan Tech, Wisconsin † indicates conference regular season champion * indicates conference tournament champion

== 1970 NCAA Tournament ==
Semifinals; March 19–20
E1	Cornell	2
W2	Wisconsin	1
W1	Michigan Tech	2
E2	Clarkson	4

National Championship; March 21
E1	Cornell	6
E2	Clarkson	4
Third Place Game
W1	Michigan Tech	5
W2	Wisconsin	6

Note: * denotes overtime period(s)

== Player stats ==
=== Scoring leaders ===
The following players led the league in points at the conclusion of the season.

GP = Games played; G = Goals; A = Assists; Pts = Points; PIM = Penalty minutes

Player	Class	Team	GP	G	A	Pts	PIM
Tim Sheehy	Senior	Boston College	24	28	40	68	20
Louis Frigon	Junior	New Hampshire	31	27	36	63	24
Curt Bennett	Junior	Brown	24	26	37	63	22
Tommy Earl	Senior	Colgate	-	37	25	62	-
Dan Lodboa	Senior	Cornell	29	24	37	61	40
John Noble	Freshman	Notre Dame	30	24	35	59	22
Jerry Kemp	Sophomore	Clarkson	32	35	22	57	24
George Morrison	Junior	Denver	32	30	27	57	12
John Hughes	Senior	Cornell	28	22	35	57	32
Bob Collyard	Junior	Colorado College	30	18	39	57	36

=== Leading goaltenders ===
The following goaltenders led the league in goals against average at the end of the regular season while playing at least 33% of their team's total minutes.

GP = Games played; Min = Minutes played; W = Wins; L = Losses; OT = Overtime/shootout losses; GA = Goals against; SO = Shutouts; SV% = Save percentage; GAA = Goals against average

Player	Class	Team	GP	Min	W	L	OT	GA	SO	SV%	GAA
Brian Cropper	Junior	Cornell	29	1710	29	0	0	53	3	.921	1.86
Peter Ormiston	Freshman	New Hampshire	–	-	-	-	-	-	-	.898	2.00
Tim Regan	Sophomore	Boston University	23	1340	-	-	-	63	2	.897	2.82
Wayne Thomas	Junior	Wisconsin	21	1250	14	7	0	60	1	-	2.88
Dan Scioletti	Junior	Army	23	1388	13	10	0	68	4	.904	2.94
Bruce Bullock	Junior	Clarkson	27	1550	19	-	-	79	4	.897	3.06
Bill McKenzie	Sophomore	Ohio State	25	1500	-	-	-	79	4	-	3.16
Murray McLachlan	Senior	Minnesota	25	1500	18	7	0	81	2	.904	3.24
Donald McGinnis	Senior	Brown	-	1441	-	-	-	79	1	.907	3.29
Ron Grahame	Freshman	Denver	30	1800	19	10	1	103	1	.883	3.43

== Awards ==
=== NCAA ===
Award		Recipient
Spencer Penrose Award		John MacInnes, Michigan Tech
Most Outstanding Player in NCAA Tournament		Dan Lodboa, Cornell
AHCA All-American Teams
East Team	Position	West Team
Bruce Bullock, Clarkson	G	Murray McLachlan, Minnesota
Dan Lodboa, Cornell	D	Ron Busniuk, Minnesota-Duluth
Mike Hyndman, Boston University	D	John Jagger, Wisconsin
	D	John Marks, North Dakota
	D	Wally Olds, Minnesota
Curt Bennett, Brown	F	Bob Collyard, Colorado College
Joe Cavanagh, Harvard	F	Murray Keogan, Minnesota-Duluth
Tommy Earl, Colgate	F	George Morrison, Denver
Tim Sheehy, Boston College	F	

=== ECAC ===
Award		Recipient
Player of the Year		Tim Sheehy, Boston College
Rookie of the Year		Tom Mellor, Boston College
Most Outstanding Player in Tournament		Bruce Bullock, Clarkson
All-ECAC Hockey Teams
First Team	Position	Second Team
Brian Cropper, Cornell	G	Don McGinnis, Brown
Mike Hyndman, Boston University	D	Tom Mellor, Boston College
Dan Lodboa, Cornell	D	Wayne LaChance, Clarkson
Tommy Earl, Colgate	F	Joe Cavanagh, Harvard
Curt Bennett, Brown	F	John Hughes, Cornell
Tim Sheehy, Boston College	F	David Poile, Northeastern

=== WCHA ===
Award		Recipient
Most Valuable Player		Murray McLachlan, Minnesota
Freshman of the Year		Murray Keogan, Minnesota-Duluth
Sophomore of the Year		Don Thompson, Michigan State
Coach of the Year		Glen Sonmor, Minnesota
All-WCHA Teams
First Team	Position	Second Team
Murray McLachlan, Minnesota	G	Wayne Thomas, Wisconsin
John Marks, North Dakota	D	John Jagger, Wisconsin
Ron Busniuk, Minnesota-Duluth	D	Wally Olds, Minnesota
George Morrison, Denver	F	Bernie Gagnon, Michigan
Murray Keogan, Minnesota-Duluth	F	Murray Heatley, Wisconsin
Bob Collyard, Colorado College	F	Tom Gilmore, Denver

== 1970 NHL Amateur Draft ==
Round	Pick	Player	College	Conference	NHL team
2	23	Murray Keogan	Minnesota–Duluth	WCHA	St. Louis Blues
4	50	Bob Gryp	Boston University	ECAC Hockey	Toronto Maple Leafs
4	56	Walt Ledingham	Minnesota–Duluth	WCHA	Chicago Black Hawks
5	65	Mike Stevens	Minnesota–Duluth	WCHA	St. Louis Blues
5	66	Rick Wilson	North Dakota	WCHA	Montreal Canadiens
5	68	Tom Mellor	Boston College	ECAC Hockey	Detroit Red Wings
6	80	Bob Brown	Boston University	ECAC Hockey	Montreal Canadiens
6	83	Murray Wing	North Dakota	WCHA	Boston Bruins
7	84	Tim Regan	Boston University	ECAC Hockey	Buffalo Sabres
7	85	Jack Taggart	Denver	WCHA	St. Louis Blues
7	95	Ed Hays	Denver	WCHA	Detroit Red Wings
8	100	Al Henry	North Dakota	WCHA	Oakland Seals
8	105	Ric Jordan	Boston University	ECAC Hockey	Montreal Canadiens
9	108	Bob Winograd	Colorado College	WCHA	St. Louis Blues
10	111	Mike Lampman	Denver	WCHA	St. Louis Blues
11	112	Jeff Rotsch	Wisconsin	WCHA	St. Louis Blues

== See also ==
- 1969–70 NCAA College Division men's ice hockey season
