= Murray McLachlan (ice hockey) =

Canadian ice hockey player

- Born: October 20, 1948 (age 76); London, Ontario, Canada
- Height: 6 ft 0 in (183 cm)
- Weight: 193 lb (88 kg; 13 st 11 lb)
- Position: Goaltender
- Caught: Left
- Played for: Toronto Maple Leafs
- NHL draft: Undrafted
- Playing career: 1970–1972

Murray McLachlan (born October 20, 1948) is a Canadian retired ice hockey goaltender who played 2 games in the National Hockey League with the Toronto Maple Leafs during the 1970–71 season. McLachlan was signed as a free agent by the Maple Leafs after starring for the University of Minnesota Golden Gophers. As a youth, he played in the 1961 Quebec International Pee-Wee Hockey Tournament with Toronto Dileo.

== Career statistics ==
=== Regular season and playoffs ===
			Regular season									Playoffs
Season	Team	League	GP	W	L	T	MIN	GA	SO	GAA	SV%	GP	W	L	MIN	GA	SO	GAA	SV%
1965–66	York Steel	MetJBHL	22	—	—	—	—	—	—	3.05	—	—	—	—	—	—	—	—	—
1967–68	University of Minnesota	B1G	22	13	9	0	1320	71	2	3.25	—	—	—	—	—	—	—	—	—
1968–69	University of Minnesota	B1G	24	12	7	2	1178	53	1	2.70	—	—	—	—	—	—	—	—	—
1969–70	University of Minnesota	B1G	25	18	7	0	1500	81	2	3.24	—	—	—	—	—	—	—	—	—
1970–71	Toronto Maple Leafs	NHL	2	0	1	0	25	4	0	9.72	.765	—	—	—	—	—	—	—	—
1970–71	Tulsa Oilers	CHL	38	17	17	4	2271	144	0	3.84	—	—	—	—	—	—	—	—	—
1971–72	Tulsa Oilers	CHL	15	8	7	0	892	49	1	3.29	—	—	—	—	—	—	—	—	—
NHL totals			2	0	1	0	25	4	0	9.72	.765	—	—	—	—	—	—	—	—

== Awards and honours ==
Award	Year
All-WCHA First Team	1968–69
All-WCHA First Team	1969–70
AHCA West All-American	1969–70

Awards and achievements
Preceded by Keith Magnuson/Bob Munro	WCHA Sophomore of the Year; 1967–68	Succeeded by George Morrison
Preceded by Keith Magnuson	WCHA Most Valuable Player; 1968–69, 1969–70	Succeeded by Bob Murray
