= George Morrison (ice hockey) =

Canadian ice hockey player

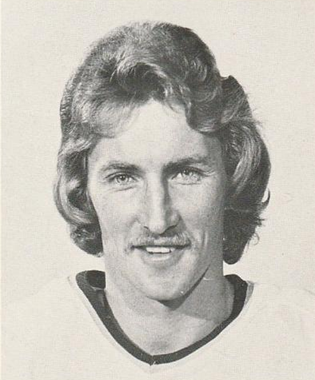
- Born: December 24, 1948 Toronto, Ontario, Canada
- Died: November 12, 2008 (aged 59) Schenectady, New York, United States
- Height: 6 ft 1 in (185 cm)
- Weight: 175 lb (79 kg; 12 st 7 lb)
- Position: Left wing
- Shot: Left
- Played for: Calgary Cowboys; Minnesota Fighting Saints; St. Louis Blues
- Playing career: 1970–1977

George Harold Morrison (December 24, 1948 – November 12, 2008) was a Canadian professional ice hockey player. He played 115 games in the National Hockey League with the St. Louis Blues from 1970 to 1972 and 361 games in the World Hockey Association with the Minnesota Fighting Saints and Calgary Cowboys from 1972 to 1977.

== Early life ==
Morrison was born in Toronto, Ontario. As a youth, Morrison played in the 1961 Quebec International Pee-Wee Hockey Tournament with the Scarboro Lions. He played with the Denver Pioneers men's ice hockey team and was inducted into the Denver University Athletic Hall of Fame in 2012.

== Career ==
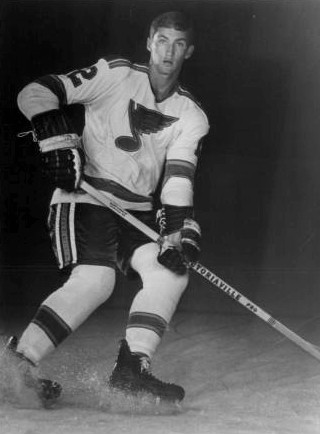
1970 photo of Morrison with St. Louis Blues.

Morrison played for the St. Louis Blues, Minnesota Fighting Saints and Calgary Cowboys. In the last game of the 1973–74 WHA season, he set a WHA record for the fastest hat trick in league history, scoring three goals within 43 seconds. He later scored his fourth goal of the game allowing him to reach the 40 goal milestone for the season.

== Personal life ==
He died in Schenectady, New York, in 2008 at the age of 59 from brain cancer.

== Career statistics ==
=== Regular season and playoffs ===
			Regular season					Playoffs
Season	Team	League	GP	G	A	Pts	PIM	GP	G	A	Pts	PIM
1968–69	University of Denver	WCHA	32	40	18	58	12	—	—	—	—	—
1969–70	University of Denver	WCHA	32	30	27	57	12	—	—	—	—	—
1970–71	St. Louis Blues	NHL	73	15	10	25	6	3	0	0	0	0
1971–72	St. Louis Blues	NHL	42	2	11	13	7	—	—	—	—	—
1972–73	Minnesota Fighting Saints	WHA	70	16	24	40	20	5	1	1	2	2
1973–74	Minnesota Fighting Saints	WHA	73	40	38	78	37	11	5	5	10	12
1974–75	Minnesota Fighting Saints	WHA	76	31	29	60	30	12	5	9	14	0
1975–76	Calgary Cowboys	WHA	79	25	32	57	13	10	3	2	5	0
1976–77	Calgary Cowboys	WHA	63	11	19	30	10	—	—	—	—	—
WHA totals			361	123	142	265	110	38	14	17	31	14
NHL totals			115	17	21	38	13	3	0	0	0	0

== Awards and honours ==
Award	Year
All-WCHA First Team	1968–69
AHCA West All-American	1968–69
All-WCHA First Team	1969–70
AHCA West All-American	1969–70

Awards and achievements
Preceded by Murray McLachlan	WCHA Sophomore of the Year; 1968–69	Succeeded by Don Thompson
