= Murray Keogan =

Canadian ice hockey player (born 1950)

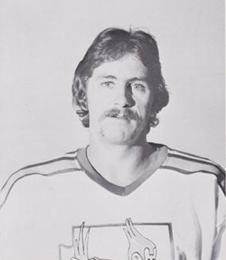
- Born: January 14, 1950 (age 76) Quebec City, Quebec, Canada
- Height: 5 ft 10 in (178 cm)
- Weight: 175 lb (79 kg; 12 st 7 lb)
- Position: Centre
- Shot: Left
- Played for: Phoenix Roadrunners; Calgary Cowboys
- NHL draft: 23rd overall, 1970; St. Louis Blues
- Playing career: 1971–1977

Murray Edward Keogan (born January 14, 1950) is a Canadian retired professional ice hockey forward. He would play 124 games in the World Hockey Association with the Phoenix Roadrunners and Calgary Cowboys.

== Career statistics ==
			Regular season					Playoffs
Season	Team	League	GP	G	A	Pts	PIM	GP	G	A	Pts	PIM
1967–68	Weyburn Red Wings	WCHL	60	33	26	59	36	—	—	—	—	—
1968–69	Weyburn Red Wings	SJHL	—	—	—	—	—	—	—	—	—	—
1969–70	University of Minnesota-Duluth	NCAA	29	21	19	40	34	—	—	—	—	—
1970–71	University of Minnesota-Duluth	NCAA	21	15	18	33	40	—	—	—	—	—
1971–72	Kansas City Blades	CHL	70	22	27	49	67	—	—	—	—	—
1972–73	Denver Spurs	WHL-Sr.	72	34	35	69	51	5	0	2	2	7
1973–74	Phoenix Roadrunners	WHL	78	31	56	87	59	7	5	2	7	4
1974–75	Phoenix Roadrunners	WHA	78	35	29	64	68	5	0	1	1	0
1975–76	Springfield Indians	AHL	23	11	9	20	22	—	—	—	—	—
1975–76	Phoenix Roadrunners	WHA	8	0	2	2	4	—	—	—	—	—
1975–76	Calgary Cowboys	WHA	38	7	11	18	19	—	—	—	—	—
1976–77	Spokane Flyers	WIHL	—	—	—	—	—	—	—	—	—	—
WHA totals			124	42	42	84	91	5	0	1	1	0

== Awards and honours ==
Award	Year
All-WCHA First Team	1969–70
AHCA West All-American	1969–70

Awards and achievements
Preceded by Award Created	WCHA Freshman of the Year; 1969–70	Succeeded by Mike Usitalo
