= John Jagger (ice hockey) =

Canadian ice hockey player

- Born: November 28, 1948 (age 77) Sault Ste. Marie, Ontario, Canada
- Died: October 2, 1989 Sault Ste Marie, Ontario
- Height: 6 ft 2 in (188 cm)
- Weight: 200 lb (91 kg; 14 st 4 lb)
- Position: Defenseman
- Played for: Wisconsin; St. Petersburg Suns
- NHL draft: Undrafted
- Playing career: 1968–1973

John Jagger is a Canadian retired ice hockey defenseman who was the first All-American for Wisconsin.

== Career ==
Jagger was recruited to Wisconsin after winning the NOJHL championship in 1967. After a year with the freshman team, Jagger joined the varsity club in 1968 and helped the team to a 22-win season. Jagger led the team's defense with 39 points and was a rising star for the Badgers as the team transitioned into the WCHA. In the team's first season of conference play, Jagger's point total dropped significantly, declining to just 16, but he was instrumental in leading Wisconsin to a 4th-place finish in the conference and was named as the program's first All-American in 1970. That same year Wisconsin shocked college hockey by defeating two-time defending national champion Denver in the conference tournament and earned the Badgers' first bid to the NCAA Tournament. Wisconsin nearly pulled off a second upset when they led undefeated Cornell at the start of the third period but a pair of goals allowed the Big Red to escape.

As a senior, Jagger's scoring returned to the level he achieved as a sophomore and Wisconsin rose to third in the conference, however, the Badgers lost in the first round of the conference tournament and Jagger's college career was over. After graduating Jagger played two seasons of professional and senior hockey before retiring.

== Statistics ==
=== Regular season and playoffs ===
			Regular Season					Playoffs
Season	Team	League	GP	G	A	Pts	PIM	GP	G	A	Pts	PIM
1965–66	Sault Ste. Marie Greyhounds	NOJHL	15	4	11	15	0	—	—	—	—	—
1966–67	Sault Ste. Marie Greyhounds	NOJHL	39	4	31	35	19	11	4	16	20	11
1968–69	Wisconsin	NCAA	34	11	28	39	12	—	—	—	—	—
1969–70	Wisconsin	WCHA	34	5	11	16	6	—	—	—	—	—
1970–71	Wisconsin	WCHA	34	6	29	35	14	—	—	—	—	—
1971–72	St. Petersburg Suns	EHL	73	8	20	28	50	6	0	1	1	0
1972–73	Sault Ste. Marie Greyhounds	USHL	—	—	—	—	—	—	—	—	—	—
NOJHL Totals			54	8	42	50	19	11	4	16	20	11
NCAA Totals			102	22	68	90	32	—	—	—	—	—

== Awards and honors ==
Award	Year
All-WCHA First Team	1969–70
AHCA West All-American	1969–70
All-WCHA Second Team	1970–71
