= Western Collegiate Hockey Association men's individual awards =

The Western Collegiate Hockey Association gives awards at the conclusion of each season. The current awards include Player of the Year, Outstanding Student-Athlete of the Year, Defensive Player of the Year, Rookie of the Year, and Coach of the Year, as well as the league leaders in points scoring and goaltending. In addition, several WCHA players have won the Hobey Baker Award for the nation's best college hockey player.

Past winners have included numerous National Hockey League players, players in European professional leagues, NHL All-Stars, Olympic gold medalists, Stanley Cup champions, and Hockey Hall of Famers. Minnesota and North Dakota are the most successful teams, with 55 award winners and statistical leaders each. All current and former members of the conference are represented, with the exception of Bowling Green.

No player has been selected for the same award more than twice. Murray McLachlan of Minnesota was named Rookie of the Year and twice named Player of the Year, the only player to be selected for three awards. Minnesota's John Mayasich and Michigan Tech's Tony Esposito are the only players to lead the conference statistically in three seasons. John MacInnes of Michigan Tech was named Coach of the Year five times.

The Outstanding Student-Athlete of the Year is chosen by a vote of faculty athletic representatives, while the Defensive Player of the Year is chosen by the league's head coaches. All other award winners are selected by votes from coaches, players, sports information directors, and local media.

All extant awards were discontinued in 2021 when the men's division of the WCHA was dissolved.

== Hobey Baker Award ==
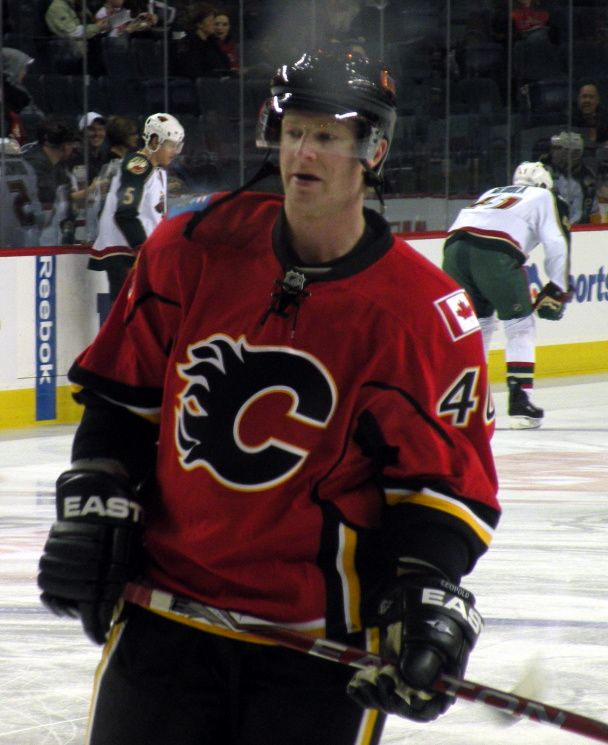
Jordan Leopold, 2002 Hobey Baker winner

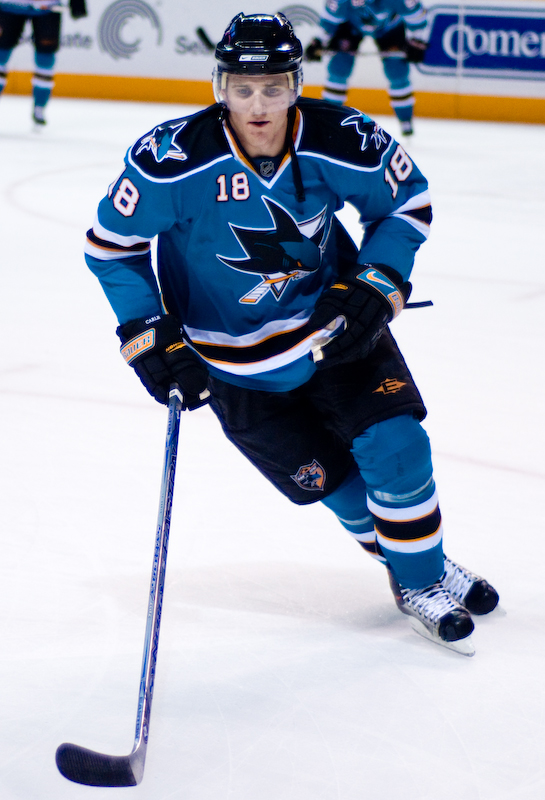
Matt Carle, 2006 Hobey Baker winner

The Hobey Baker Award has been awarded annually since 1981 to the most outstanding player in NCAA ice hockey. In that time, 16 players have won the award while playing for WCHA schools.

=== Winners ===
Year	Player	Position	School
1981	Neal Broten	Center	Minnesota
1984	Tom Kurvers	Defense	Minnesota–Duluth
1985	Bill Watson	Right Wing	Minnesota–Duluth
1987	Tony Hrkac	Center	North Dakota
1988	Robb Stauber	Goaltender	Minnesota
1994	Chris Marinucci	Left Wing	Minnesota–Duluth
1996	Brian Bonin	Center	Minnesota
2002	Jordan Leopold	Defense	Minnesota
2003	Peter Sejna	Left Wing	Colorado College
2004	Junior Lessard	Right Wing	Minnesota–Duluth
2005	Marty Sertich	Center	Colorado College
2006	Matt Carle	Defense	Denver
2007	Ryan Duncan	Left Wing	North Dakota
2010	Blake Geoffrion	Center	Wisconsin
2012	Jack Connolly	Center	Minnesota–Duluth
2013	Drew LeBlanc	Forward	St. Cloud State

=== Winners by school ===
School	Winners	Years
Minnesota–Duluth	5	1984, 1985, 1994, 2004, 2012
Minnesota	4	1981, 1988, 1996, 2002
North Dakota	2	1987, 2007
Colorado College	2	2003, 2005
Denver	1	2006
Wisconsin	1	2010
St. Cloud State	1	2013

== Player of the Year ==
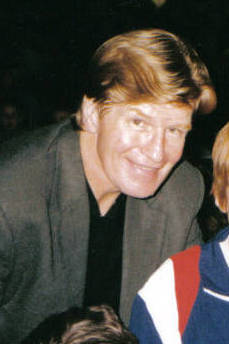
Keith Magnuson, 1967–68 Most Valuable Player

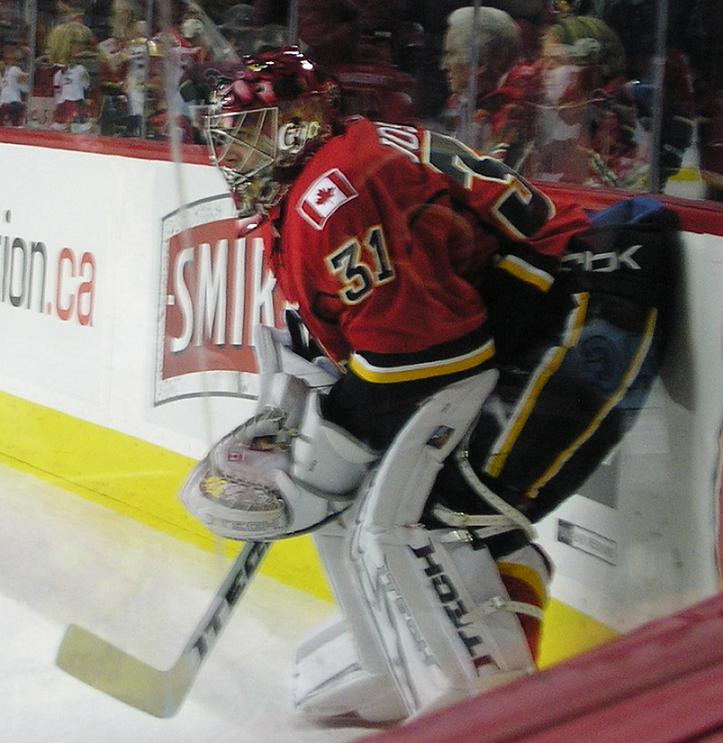
Curtis Joseph, 1988–89 Most Valuable Player

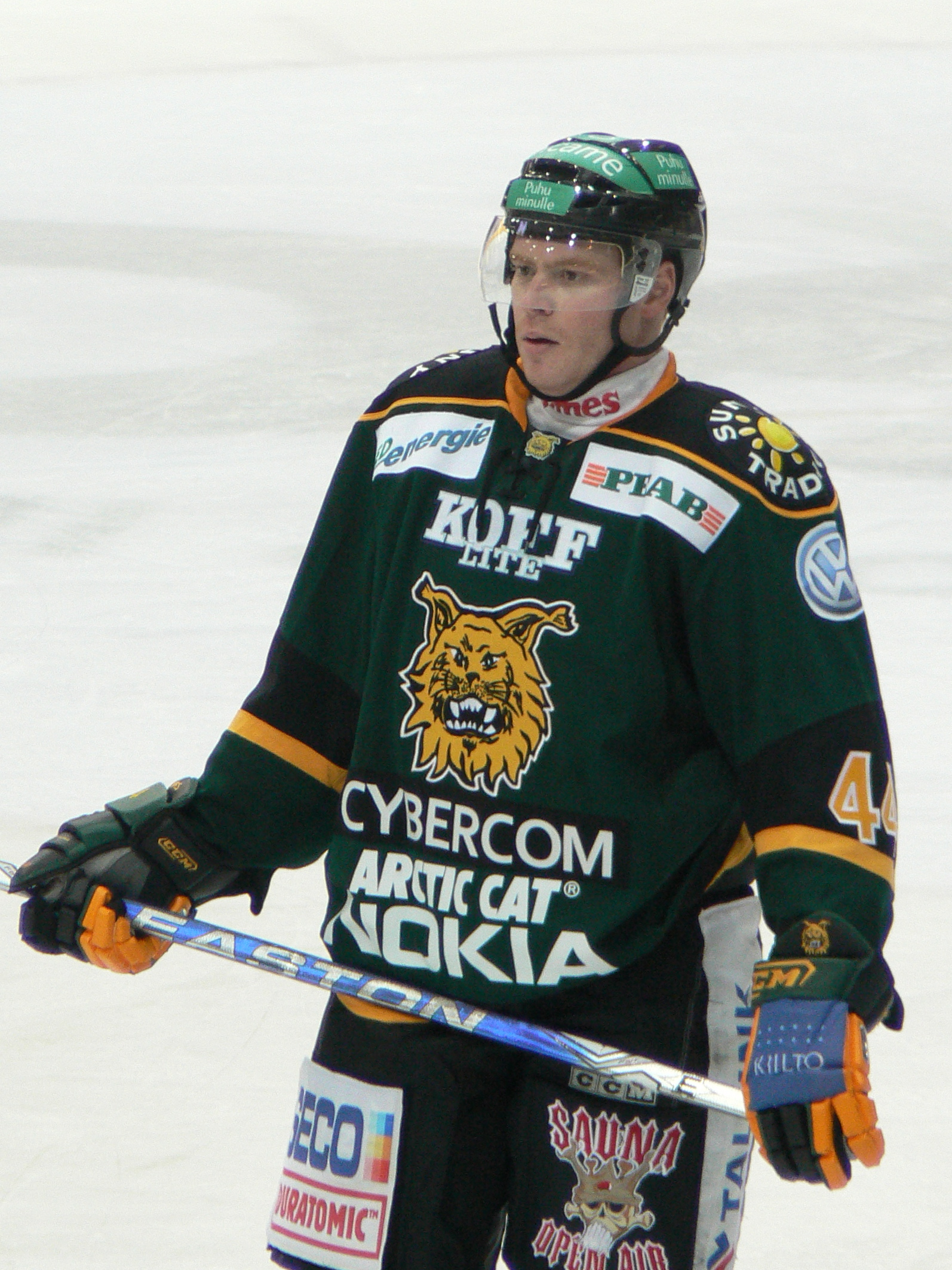
Junior Lessard, 2003–04 Player of the Year and Hobey Baker winner

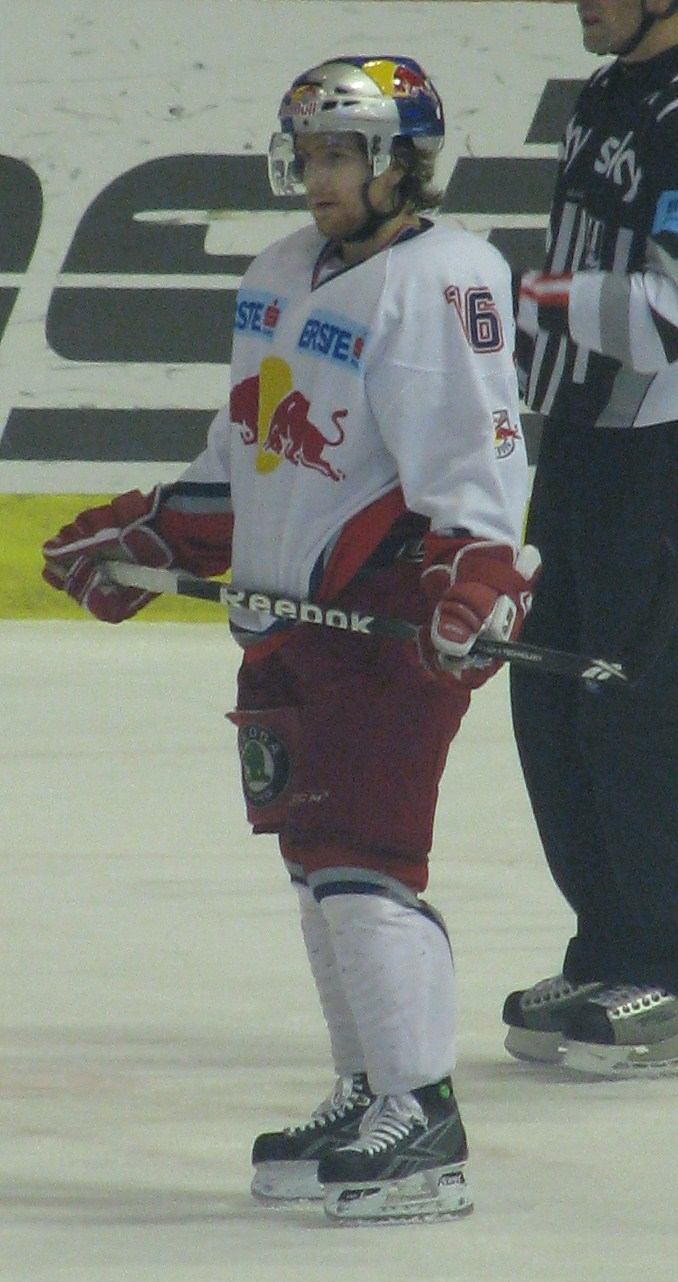
Ryan Duncan, 2006–07 Player of the Year and Hobey Baker winner

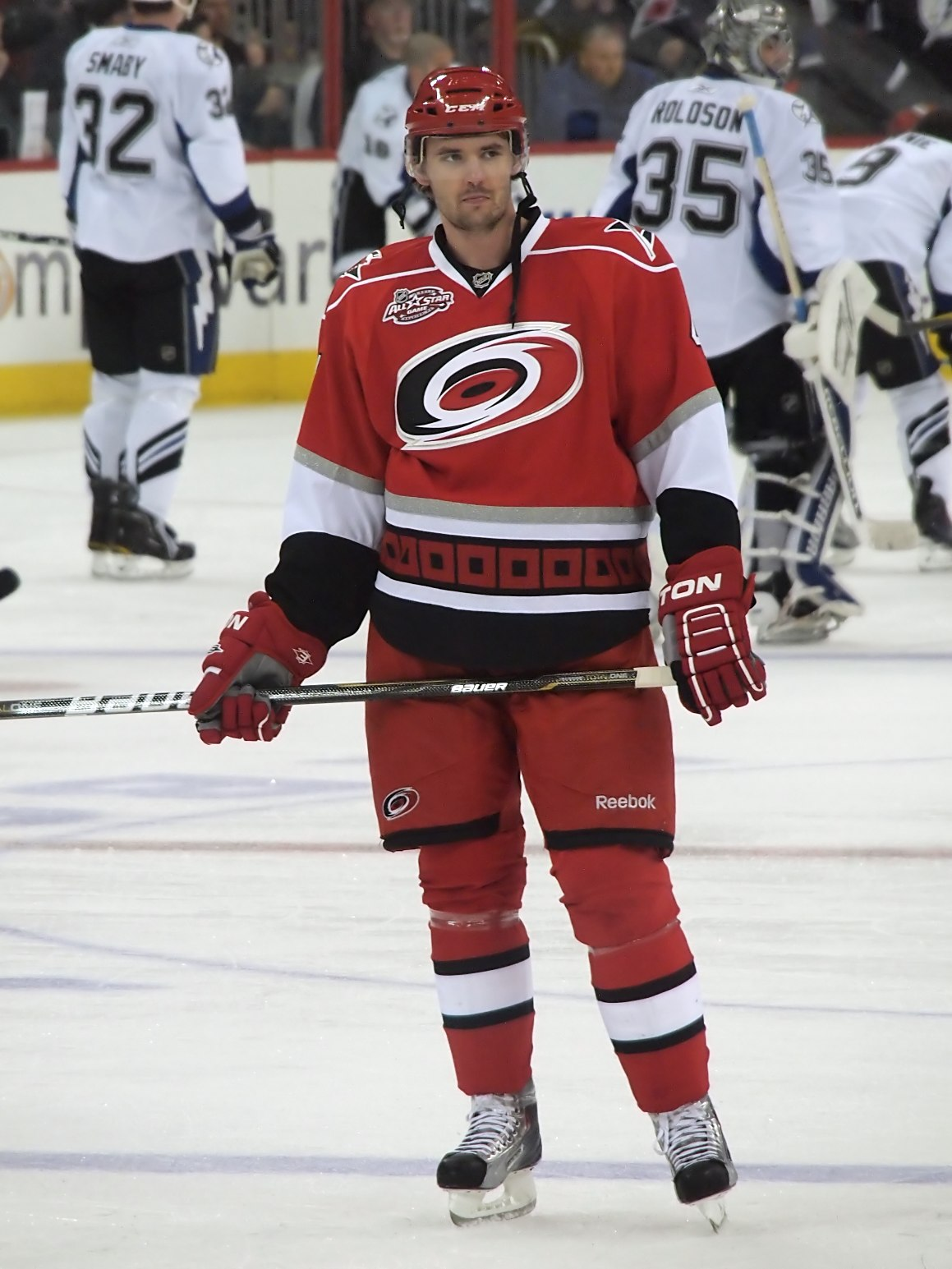
Jamie McBain, 2008–09 Player of the Year

The Player of the Year award has been awarded since the 1960–61 season. Before 1992, it was known as the Most Valuable Player award.

=== Winners ===
Season	Player	Position	School
1960–61	Jerry Walker	Forward	Denver
1961–62	Red Berenson	Forward	Michigan
1962–63	Lou Nanne	Defenseman	Minnesota
1963–64	none selected		
1964–65	Gerry Kell	Forward	North Dakota
1965–66	Mel Wakabayashi	Forward	Michigan
1966–67	Keith Christiansen	Forward	Minnesota–Duluth
1967–68	Keith Magnuson	Defenseman	Denver
1968–69	Murray McLachlan	Goaltender	Minnesota
1969–70	Murray McLachlan (2)	Goaltender	Minnesota
1970–71	Bob Murray	Defenseman	Michigan Tech
1971–72	Doug Palazzari	Forward	Colorado College
1972–73	Ron Grahame	Goaltender	Denver
1973–74	Doug Palazzari (2)	Forward	Colorado College
1974–75	Mike Polich	Forward	Minnesota
1974–75	Tom Ross	Forward	Michigan State
1975–76	Mike Zuke	Forward	Michigan Tech
1976–77	Brian Walsh	Forward	Notre Dame
1977–78	Mike Eaves	Forward	Wisconsin
1978–79	Mark Johnson	Forward	Wisconsin
1979–80	Tim Harrer	Forward	Minnesota
1980–81	Steve Ulseth	Forward	Minnesota
1981–82	Phil Sykes	Forward	North Dakota
1982–83	Bob Mason	Goaltender	Minnesota–Duluth
1983–84	Tom Kurvers	Defenseman	Minnesota–Duluth
1984–85	Bill Watson	Forward	Minnesota–Duluth
1985–86	Dallas Gaume	Forward	Denver
1986–87	Tony Hrkac	Forward	North Dakota
1987–88	Robb Stauber	Goaltender	Minnesota
1988–89	Curtis Joseph	Goaltender	Wisconsin
1989–90	Gary Shuchuk	Forward	Wisconsin
1990–91	Scott Beattie	Forward	Northern Michigan
1991–92	Duane Derksen	Goaltender	Wisconsin
1992–93	Derek Plante	Forward	Minnesota–Duluth
1993–94	Chris Marinucci	Forward	Minnesota–Duluth
1994–95	Brian Bonin	Forward	Minnesota
1995–96	Brian Bonin (2)	Forward	Minnesota
1996–97	Mike Crowley	Defenseman	Minnesota
1997–98	Curtis Murphy	Defenseman	North Dakota
1998–99	Jason Blake	Forward	North Dakota
1999–2000	Steve Reinprecht	Forward	Wisconsin
2000–01	Jeff Panzer	Forward	North Dakota
2001–02	Mark Hartigan	Forward	St. Cloud State
2002–03	Peter Sejna	Forward	Colorado College
2003–04	Junior Lessard	Forward	Minnesota–Duluth
2004–05	Marty Sertich	Forward	Colorado College
2005–06	Matt Carle	Defenseman	Denver
2006–07	Ryan Duncan	Forward	North Dakota
2007–08	Richard Bachman	Goaltender	Colorado College
2008–09	Jamie McBain	Defenseman	Wisconsin
2009–10	Marc Cheverie	Goaltender	Denver
2010–11	Matt Frattin	Forward	North Dakota
2011–12	Jack Connolly	Forward	Minnesota–Duluth
2012–13	Drew LeBlanc	Forward	St. Cloud State
2013–14	Cody Kunyk	Forward	Alaska
2014–15	Tanner Kero	Forward	Michigan Tech
2015–16	Alex Petan	Forward	Michigan Tech
2016–17	Michael Bitzer	Forward	Bemidji State
2017–18	C. J. Suess	Forward	Minnesota State
2018–19	Troy Loggins	Forward	Northern Michigan
2019–20	Marc Michaelis	Forward	Minnesota State
2020–21	Dryden McKay	Goaltender	Minnesota State

=== Winners by school ===
School	Winners	Years
Minnesota	10	1963, 1969, 1970, 1975, 1980, 1981, 1988, 1995, 1996, 1997
North Dakota	8	1965, 1982, 1987, 1998, 1999, 2001, 2007, 2011
Minnesota–Duluth	8	1967, 1983, 1984, 1985, 1993, 1994, 2004, 2012
Wisconsin	7	1978, 1979, 1989, 1990, 1992, 2000, 2009
Denver	6	1961, 1968, 1973, 1986, 2006, 2010
Colorado College	5	1972, 1974, 2003, 2005, 2008
Michigan Tech	4	1971, 1976, 2015, 2016
Minnesota State	3	2018, 2020, 2021
Michigan	2	1962, 1966
Northern Michigan	2	1991, 2019
St. Cloud State	2	2002, 2013
Michigan State	1	1975
Notre Dame	1	1977
Alaska	1	2014
Bemidji State	1	2017

== Offensive Player of the Year ==
The Offensive Player of the Year was first awarded in 2019.

=== Winners ===
Season	Player	Position	School
2019–20	Marc Michaelis	Forward	Minnesota State
2020–21	Julian Napravnik	Forward	Minnesota State

=== Winners by school ===
School	Winners	Years
Minnesota State	2	2020, 2021

== Outstanding Student-Athlete of the Year ==
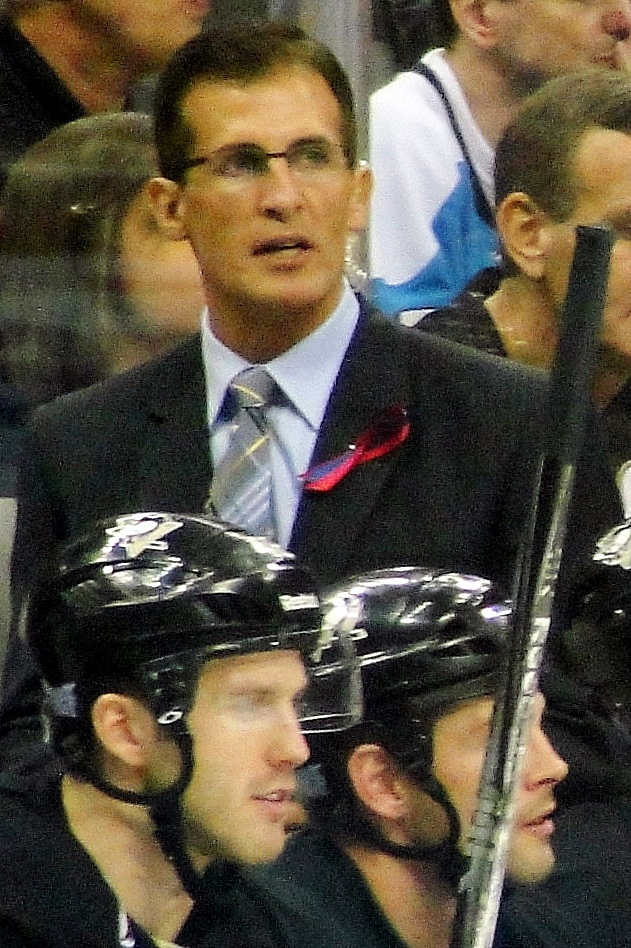
Tony Granato, 1986–87 Student-Athlete of the Year

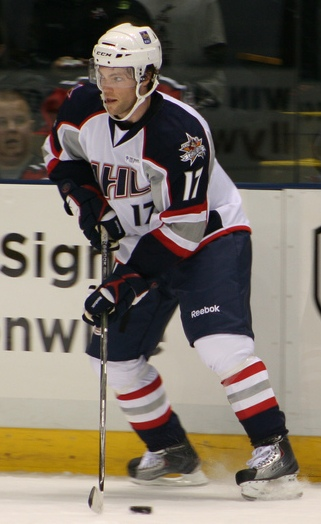
Mark Cullen, 2001–02 Student-Athlete of the Year

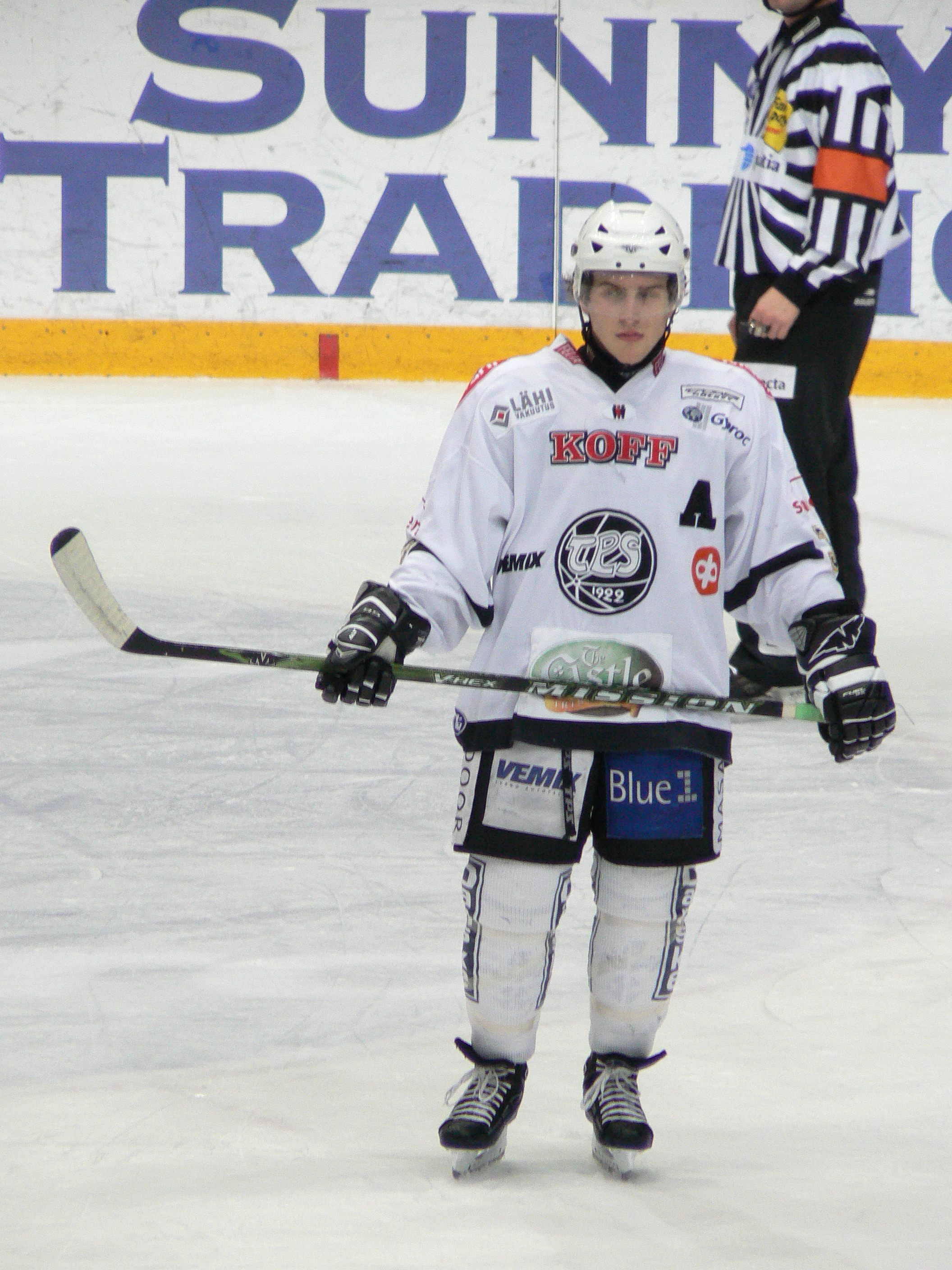
Lee Sweatt, 2006–07 Student-Athlete of the Year

=== Winners ===
Season	Player	Position	School
1986–87	Tony Granato	Forward	Wisconsin
1987–88	Steve Johnson	Forward	North Dakota
1988–89	Tim Budy	Forward	Colorado College
1989–90	Dave Shields	Forward	Denver
1990–91	Brad Werenka	Defenseman	Northern Michigan
1991–92	Geoff Sarjeant	Goaltender	Michigan Tech
1992–93	Brett Hauer	Defenseman	Minnesota–Duluth
1993–94	Brian Konowalchuk	Forward	Denver
1993–94	Jeff Nielsen	Forward	Minnesota
1994–95	Justin McHugh	Forward	Minnesota
1995–96	Dan Trebil	Defenseman	Minnesota
1996–97	Petri Gunther	Defenseman	Denver
1997–98	Mitch Vig	Defenseman	North Dakota
1998–99	Kyle McLaughlin	Defenseman	St. Cloud State
1998–99	Scott Swanson	Defenseman	Colorado College
1999–2000	Jeff Scissons	Forward	Minnesota–Duluth
2000–01	Karl Goehring	Goaltender	North Dakota
2001–02	Mark Cullen	Forward	Colorado College
2002–03	Tom Preissing	Defenseman	Colorado College
2003–04	Connor James	Forward	Denver
2004–05	Steven Johns	Defenseman	Minnesota State
2005–06	Ted O'Leary	Forward	Denver
2006–07	Lee Sweatt	Defenseman	Colorado College
2007–08	Joel Hanson	Defenseman	Minnesota State
2008–09	J. P. Testwuide	Defenseman	Denver
2009–10	Eli Vlaisavljevich	Defenseman	Michigan Tech
2010–11	Chay Genoway	Defenseman	North Dakota
2011–12	Brad Eidsness	Goaltender	North Dakota
2012–13	Drew LeBlanc	Forward	St. Cloud State
2013–14	Chad Brears	Forward	Alabama–Huntsville
2014–15	Tanner Kero	Forward	Michigan Tech
2015–16	Jamie Phillips	Goaltender	Michigan Tech
2016–17	Chad McDonald	Forward	Ferris State
2017–18	Olivier Mantha	Goaltender	Alaska–Anchorage
2018–19	Max Coatta	Forward	Minnesota State
2019–20	Edwin Hookenson	Defenseman	Minnesota State
2020–21	Zach Driscoll	Goaltender	Bemidji State

=== Winners by school ===
School	Winners	Years
Denver	6	1989–90, 1993–94^{†}, 1996–97, 2003–04, 2005–06, 2008–09
North Dakota	5	1987–88, 1997–98, 2000–01, 2010–11, 2011–12
Colorado College	5	1988–89, 1998–99^{†}, 2001–02, 2002–03, 2006–07
Michigan Tech	4	1991–92, 2009–10, 2014–15, 2015–16
Minnesota State	4	2004–05, 2007–08, 2018–19, 2019–20
Minnesota	3	1993–94^{†}, 1994–95, 1995–96
Minnesota–Duluth	2	1992–93, 1999–2000
St. Cloud State	2	1998–99^{†}, 2012–13
Wisconsin	1	1986–87
Northern Michigan	1	1990–91
Alabama–Huntsville	1	2013–14
Bemidji State	1	2020–21

== Defensive Player of the Year ==
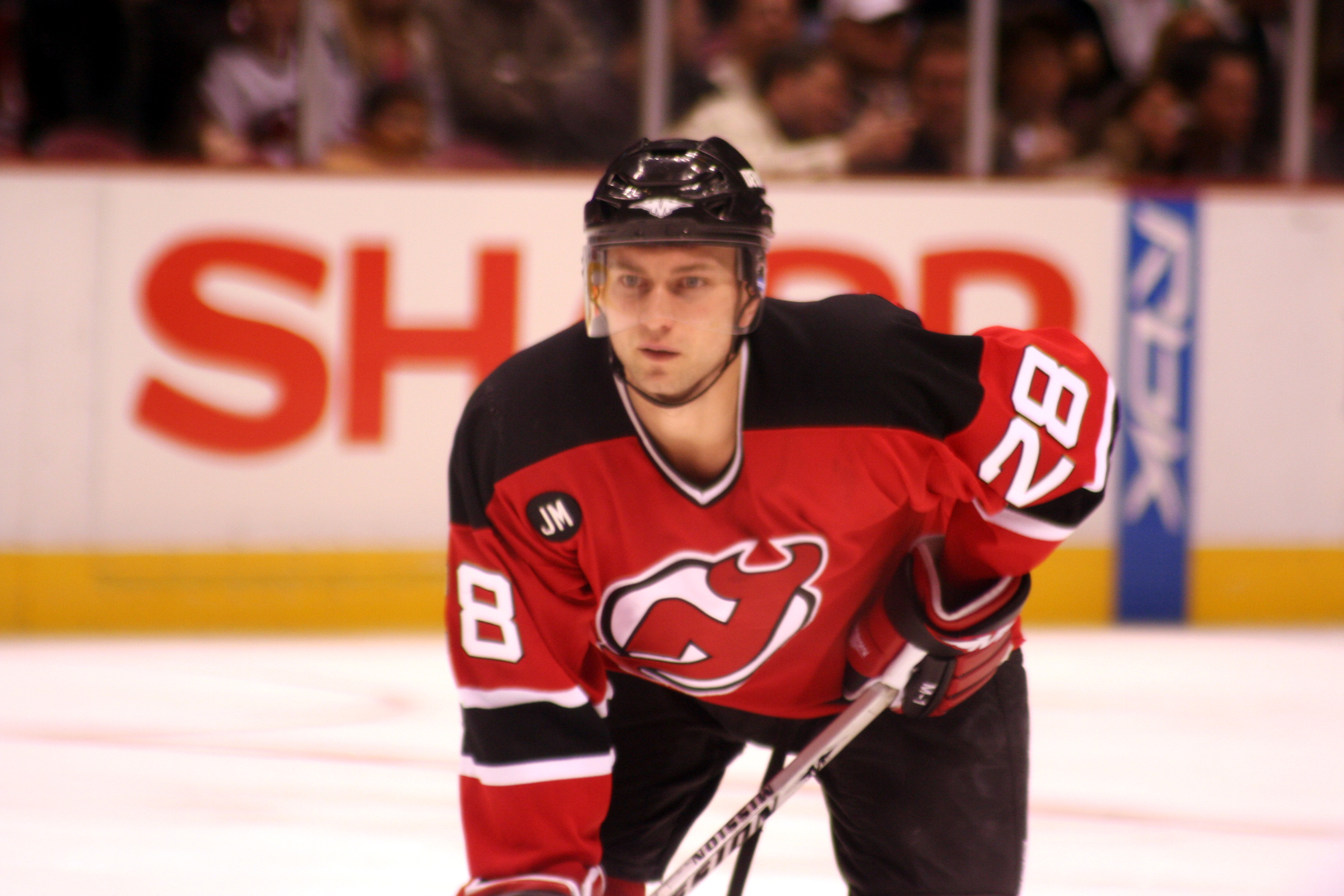
Brian Rafalski, 1994–95 Defensive player of the Year

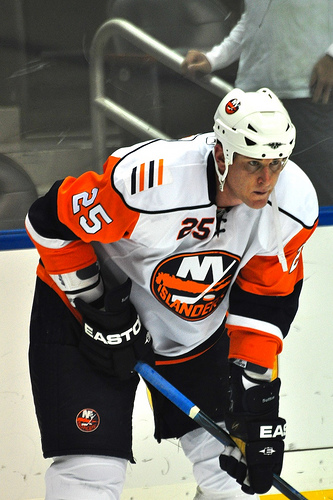
Andy Sutton, 1997–98 co-Defensive Player of the Year

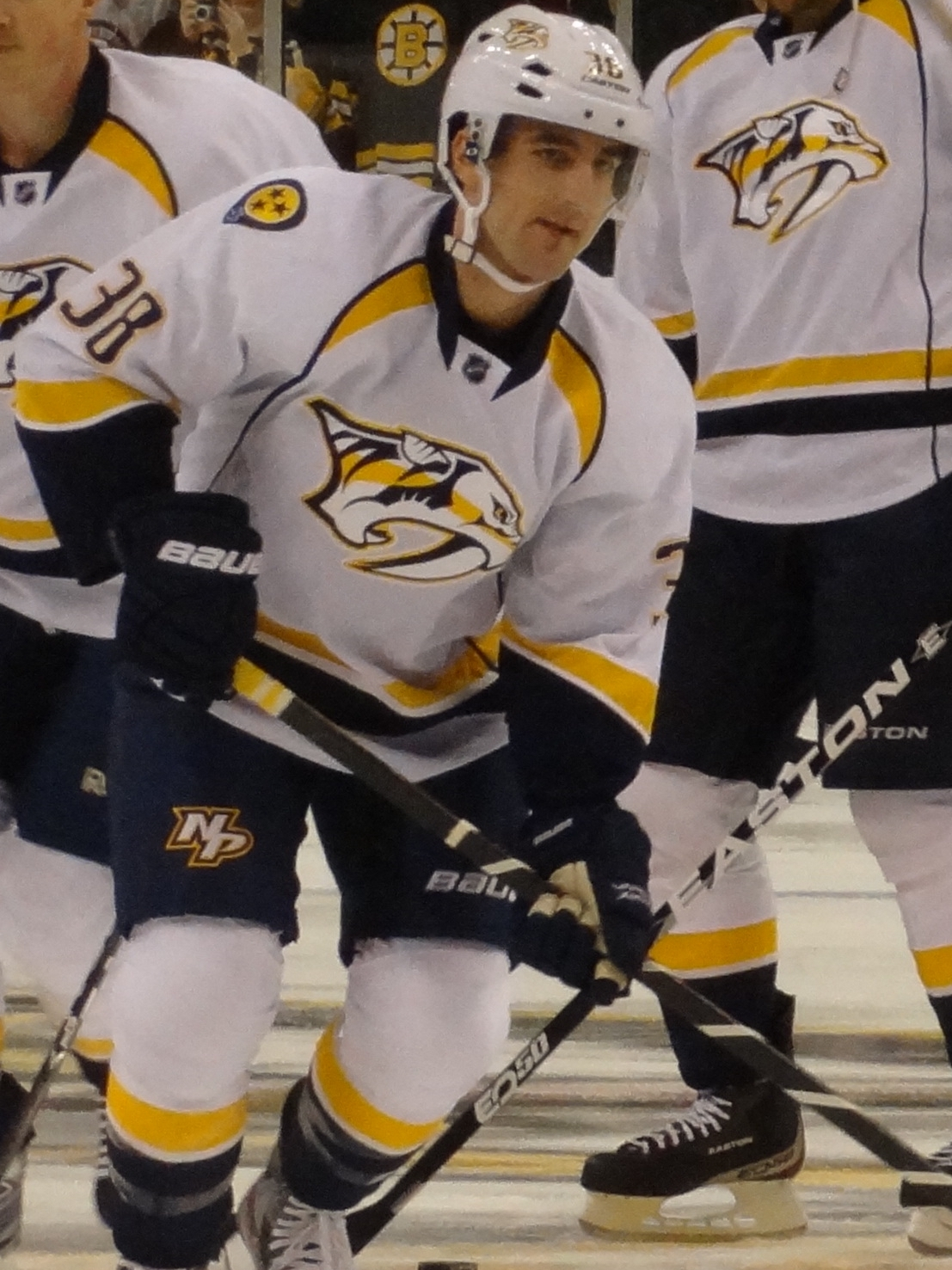
Jack Hillen, 2007–08 Defensive Player of the Year

=== Winners ===
Season	Player	Position	School
1991–92	Dallas Drake	Forward	Northern Michigan
1992–93	Chris Hynnes	Defenseman	Colorado College
1993–94	Shawn Reid	Defenseman	Colorado College
1994–95	Brian Rafalski	Defenseman	Wisconsin
1995–96	Eric Rud	Defenseman	Colorado College
1996–97	Eric Rud (2)	Defenseman	Colorado College
1997–98	Matt Henderson	Forward	North Dakota
1997–98	Andy Sutton	Defenseman	Michigan Tech
1998–99	Brad Williamson	Defenseman	North Dakota
1999–2000	Jeff Dessner	Defenseman	Wisconsin
2000–01	Jordan Leopold	Defenseman	Minnesota
2001–02	Jordan Leopold (2)	Defenseman	Minnesota
2002–03	Joe Cullen	Forward	Colorado College
2002–03	Aaron MacKenzie	Defenseman	Denver
2003–04	Ryan Caldwell	Defenseman	Denver
2004–05	Mark Stuart	Defenseman	Colorado College
2005–06	Matt Carle	Defenseman	Denver
2006–07	Alex Goligoski	Defenseman	Minnesota
2007–08	Jack Hillen	Defenseman	Colorado College
2008–09	Chay Genoway	Defenseman	North Dakota
2009–10	Brendan Smith	Defenseman	Wisconsin
2010–11	Justin Schultz	Defenseman	Wisconsin
2011–12	Justin Schultz (2)	Defenseman	Wisconsin
2012–13	Nick Jensen	Defenseman	St. Cloud State
2013–14	Colton Parayko	Defenseman	Alaska
2014–15	Colton Parayko (2)	Defenseman	Alaska
2015–16	Casey Nelson	Defenseman	Minnesota State
2016–17	Daniel Brickley	Defenseman	Minnesota State
2017–18	Alec Rauhauser	Defenseman	Bowling Green
2018–19	Philip Beaulieu	Defenseman	Northern Michigan
2019–20	Alec Rauhauser	Defenseman	Bowling Green
2020–21	Will Cullen	Defenseman	Bowling Green
2020–21	Elias Rosén	Defenseman	Bemidji State

=== Winners by school ===
School	Winners	Years
Colorado College	7	1992–93, 1993–94, 1995–96, 1996–97, 2002–03^{†}, 2004–05, 2007–08
Wisconsin	5	1994–95, 1999–2000, 2009–10, 2010–11, 2011–12
North Dakota	3	1997–98^{†}, 1998–99, 2008–09
Minnesota	3	2000–01, 2001–02, 2006–07
Denver	3	2002–03^{†}, 2003–04, 2005–06
Bowling Green	3	2017–18, 2019–20, 2020–21^{†}
Alaska	2	2013–14, 2014–15
Minnesota State	2	2015–16, 2016–17
Northern Michigan	2	1991–92, 2018–19
Michigan Tech	1	1997–98^{†}
St. Cloud State	1	2012–13
Bemidji State	1	2020–21^{†}

== Goaltender of the Year ==
=== Winners ===
Season	Player	School
2017–18	Atte Tolvanen	Northern Michigan
2018–19	Atte Tolvanen	Northern Michigan
2019–20	Dryden McKay	Minnesota State
2020–21	Dryden McKay	Minnesota State

=== Winners by school ===
School	Winners	Years
Minnesota State	2	2019–20, 2020–21
Northern Michigan	2	2017–18, 2018–19

== Rookie of the Year ==
Gordon Wilkie, 1961–62 Sophomore of the Year

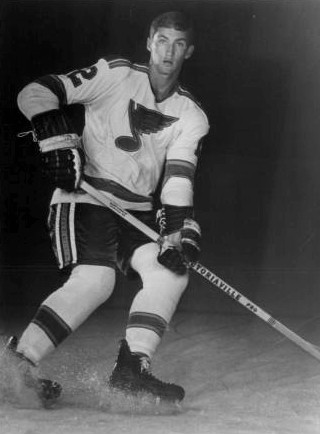
George Morrison, 1968–69 Sophomore of the Year

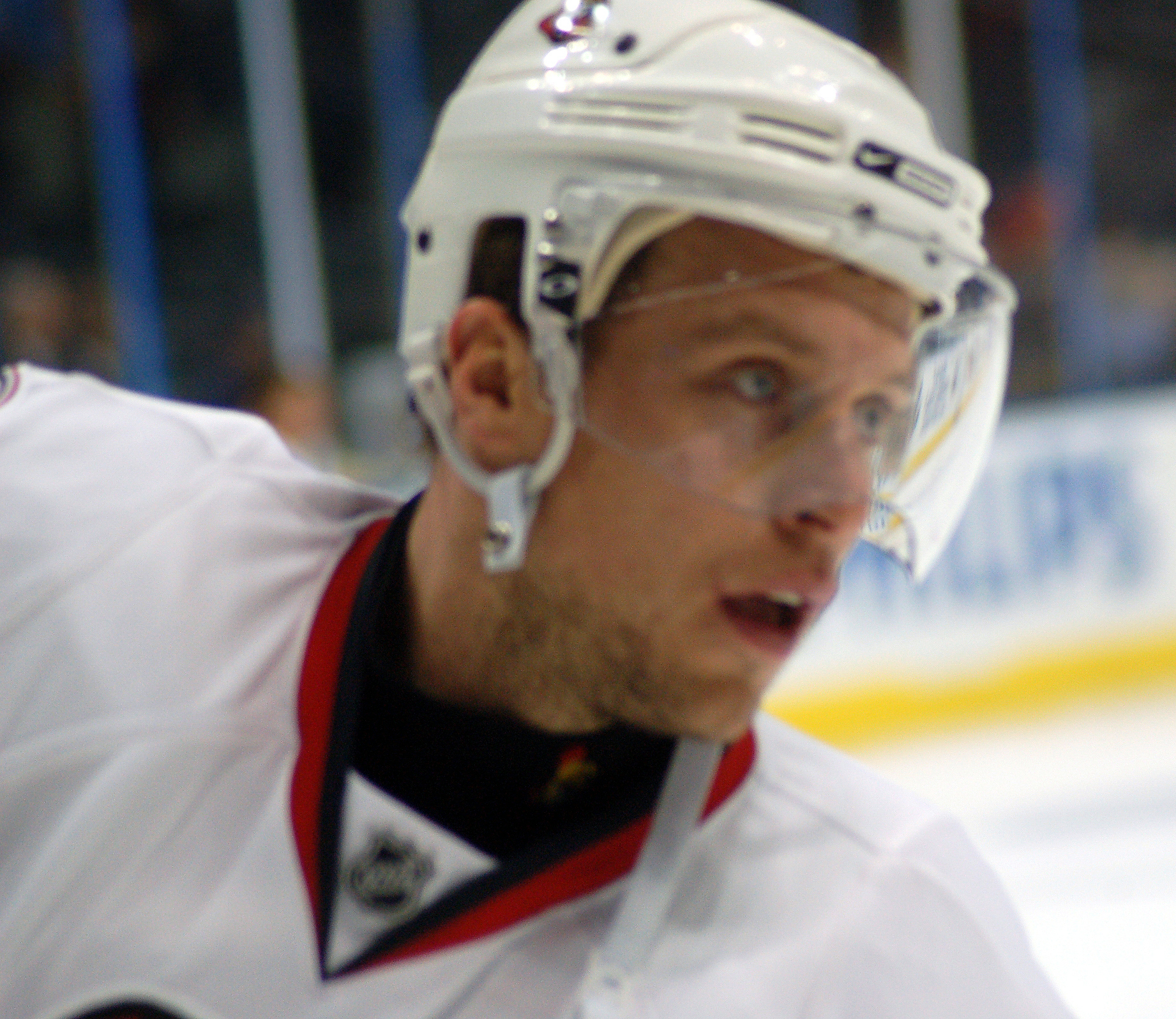
Dany Heatley, 1999–2000 Rookie of the Year

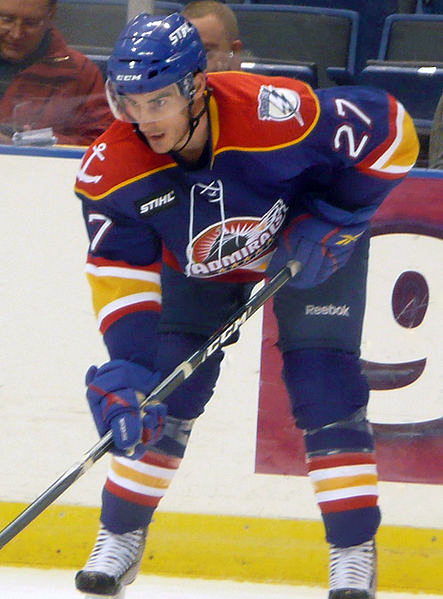
Brandon Bochenski, 2001–02 Rookie of the Year

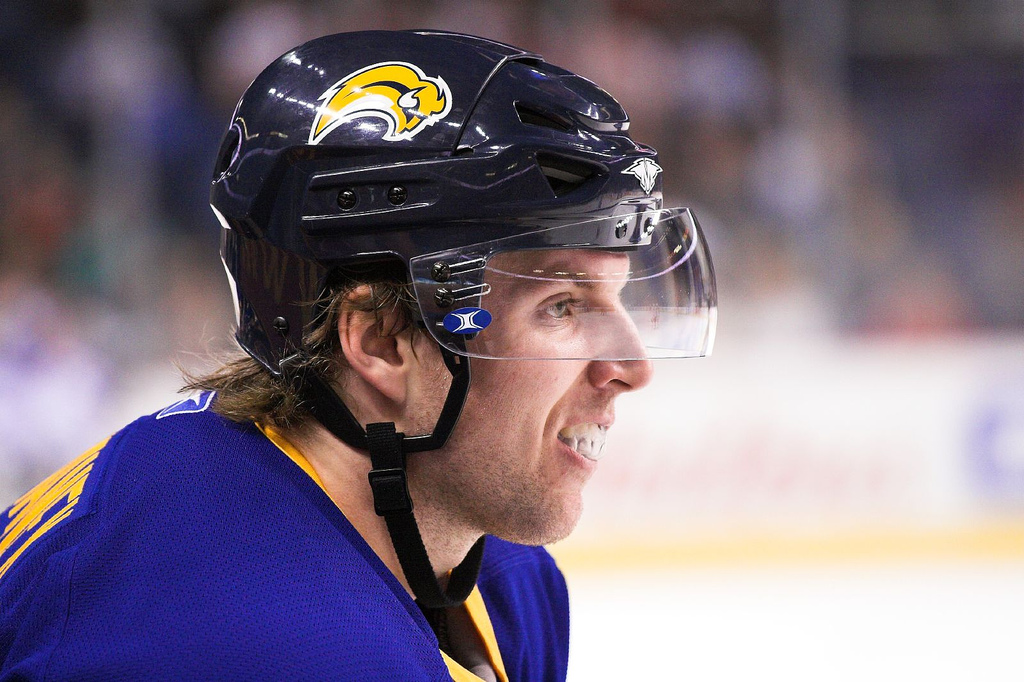
Thomas Vanek, 2002–03 Rookie of the Year

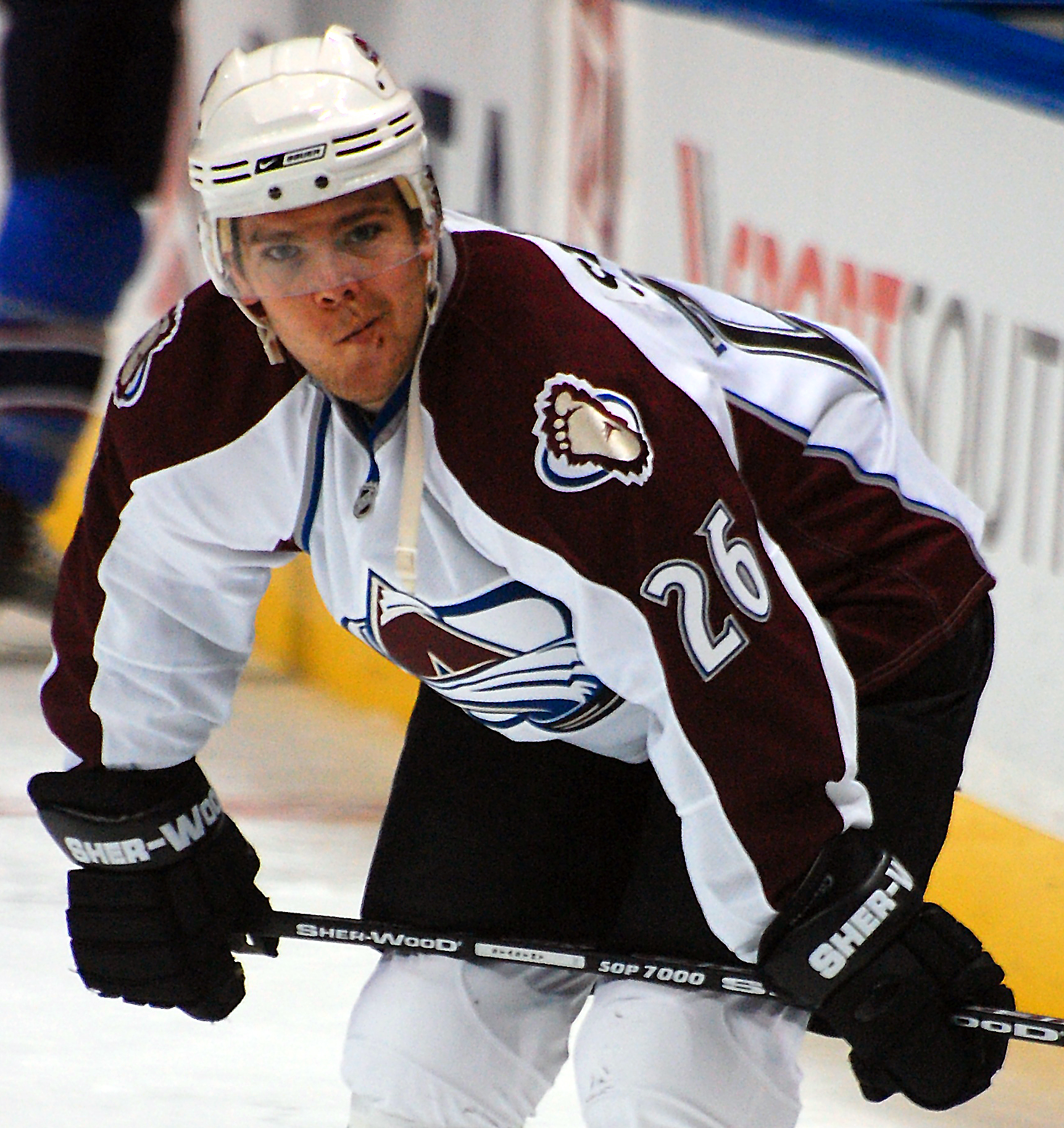
Paul Stastny, 2004–05 Rookie of the Year

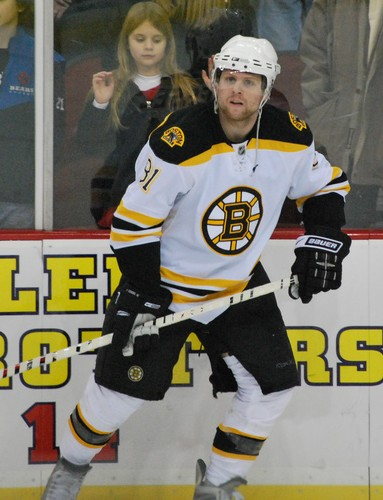
Phil Kessel, 2005–06 Rookie of the Year

=== Winners ===
Sophomore of the Year
Season	Player	Position	School
1959–60^{†}	George Kirkwood	Goaltender	Denver
1959–60^{†}	Lou Angotti	Forward	Michigan Tech
1960–61	Jack Wilson	Defenseman	Denver
1961–62	Gordon Wilkie	Forward	Michigan
1962–63	George Hill	Forward	Michigan Tech
1963–64	Tom Polanic	Defenseman	Michigan
1964–65	Gary Milroy	Forward	Michigan Tech
1965–66	Gary Gambucci	Forward	Minnesota
1966–67^{†}	Keith Magnuson	Defenseman	Denver
1966–67^{†}	Bob Munro	Forward	North Dakota
1967–68	Murray McLachlan	Goaltender	Minnesota
1968–69	George Morrison	Forward	Denver
1969–70	Don Thompson	Forward	Michigan State

Freshman of the Year/Rookie of the Year
Season	Player	Position	School
1969–70	Murray Keogan	Forward	Minnesota–Duluth
1970–71	Mike Usitalo	Forward	Michigan Tech
1971–72	Alan Hangsleben	Defenseman	North Dakota
1972–73	Mike Zuke	Forward	Michigan Tech
1973–74	Brian Walsh	Forward/Defense	Notre Dame
1974–75	Jim Warner	Forward	Colorado College
1975–76	Dave Delich	Forward	Colorado College
1976–77	Mark Johnson	Forward	Wisconsin
1977–78	Greg Whyte	Forward	Colorado College
1978–79	Kevin Maxwell	Forward	North Dakota
1979–80	Aaron Broten	Forward	Minnesota
1980–81	Ron Scott	Goaltender	Michigan State
1981–82	James Patrick	Defenseman	North Dakota
1982–83	Craig Redmond	Defenseman	Denver
1983–84	Rick Kosti	Goaltender	Minnesota–Duluth
1984–85	Brett Hull	Forward	Minnesota–Duluth
1985–86	Mike Richter	Goaltender	Wisconsin
1986–87	Dave Shields	Forward	Denver
1987–88	Rick Berens	Forward	Denver
1988–89	Curtis Joseph	Goaltender	Wisconsin
1989–90	Scott Beattie	Forward	Northern Michigan
1990–91	Tony Szabo	Forward	Northern Michigan
1991–92	Darby Hendrickson	Forward	Minnesota
1992–93	Jim Carey	Goaltender	Wisconsin
1993–94	Landon Wilson	Forward	North Dakota
1994–95	Mike Crowley	Defenseman	Minnesota
1995–96	Brian Swanson	Forward	Colorado College
1996–97	Brant Nicklin	Goaltender	Minnesota–Duluth
1997–98	Karl Goehring	Goaltender	North Dakota
1998–99	Gregg Naumenko	Goaltender	Alaska–Anchorage
1999–2000	Dany Heatley	Forward	Wisconsin
2000–01	Peter Sejna	Forward	Colorado College
2001–02	Brandon Bochenski	Forward	North Dakota
2002–03	Thomas Vanek	Forward	Minnesota
2003–04	Brady Murray	Forward	North Dakota
2004–05	Paul Stastny	Forward	Denver
2005–06	Phil Kessel	Forward	Minnesota
2006–07	Andreas Nödl	Forward	St. Cloud State
2007–08	Richard Bachman	Goaltender	Colorado College
2008–09	Jordan Schroeder	Forward	Minnesota
2009–10	Danny Kristo	Forward	North Dakota
2010–11	Jason Zucker	Forward	Denver
2011–12	Joey LaLeggia	Defenseman	Denver
2012–13	Stephon Williams	Goaltender	Minnesota State
2013–14	Alex Globke	Forward	Lake Superior State
2014–15	Michael Bitzer	Goaltender	Bemidji State
2015–16	Corey Mackin	Forward	Ferris State
2016–17	Marc Michaelis	Forward	Minnesota State
2017–18	Jake Jaremko	Center	Minnesota State
2018–19	Cooper Zech	Defenseman	Ferris State
2019–20	Lucas Sowder	Forward	Minnesota State
2020–21	Akito Hirose	Defenseman	Minnesota State

=== Winners by school ===
School	Winners	Years
Denver	10	1959–60^{†}, 1960–61, 1966–67^{†}, 1968–69, 1982–83, 1986–87, 1987–88, 2004–05, 2010–11, 2011–12
North Dakota	9	1966–67^{†}, 1971–72, 1978–79, 1981–82, 1993–94, 1997–98, 2001–02, 2003–04, 2009–10
Minnesota	8	1965–66, 1967–68, 1979–80, 1991–92, 1994–95, 2002–03, 2005–06, 2008–09
Colorado College	6	1974–75, 1975–76, 1977–78, 1995–96, 2000–01, 2007–08
Michigan Tech	5	1959–60^{†}, 1962–63, 1964–65, 1970–71, 1972–73
Wisconsin	5	1976–77, 1985–86, 1988–89, 1992–93, 1999–2000
Minnesota State	5	2012–13, 2016–17, 2017–18, 2019–20, 2020–21
Minnesota–Duluth	4	1969–70^{Fr.}, 1983–84, 1984–85, 1996–97
Ferris State	2	2015–16, 2018–19
Michigan	2	1961–62, 1963–64
Michigan State	2	1969–70^{So.}, 1980–81
Northern Michigan	2	1989–90, 1990–91
Notre Dame	1	1973–74
Alaska–Anchorage	1	1998–99
St. Cloud State	1	2006–07
Lake Superior State	1	2013–14
Bemidji State	1	2014–15

== Coach of the Year ==
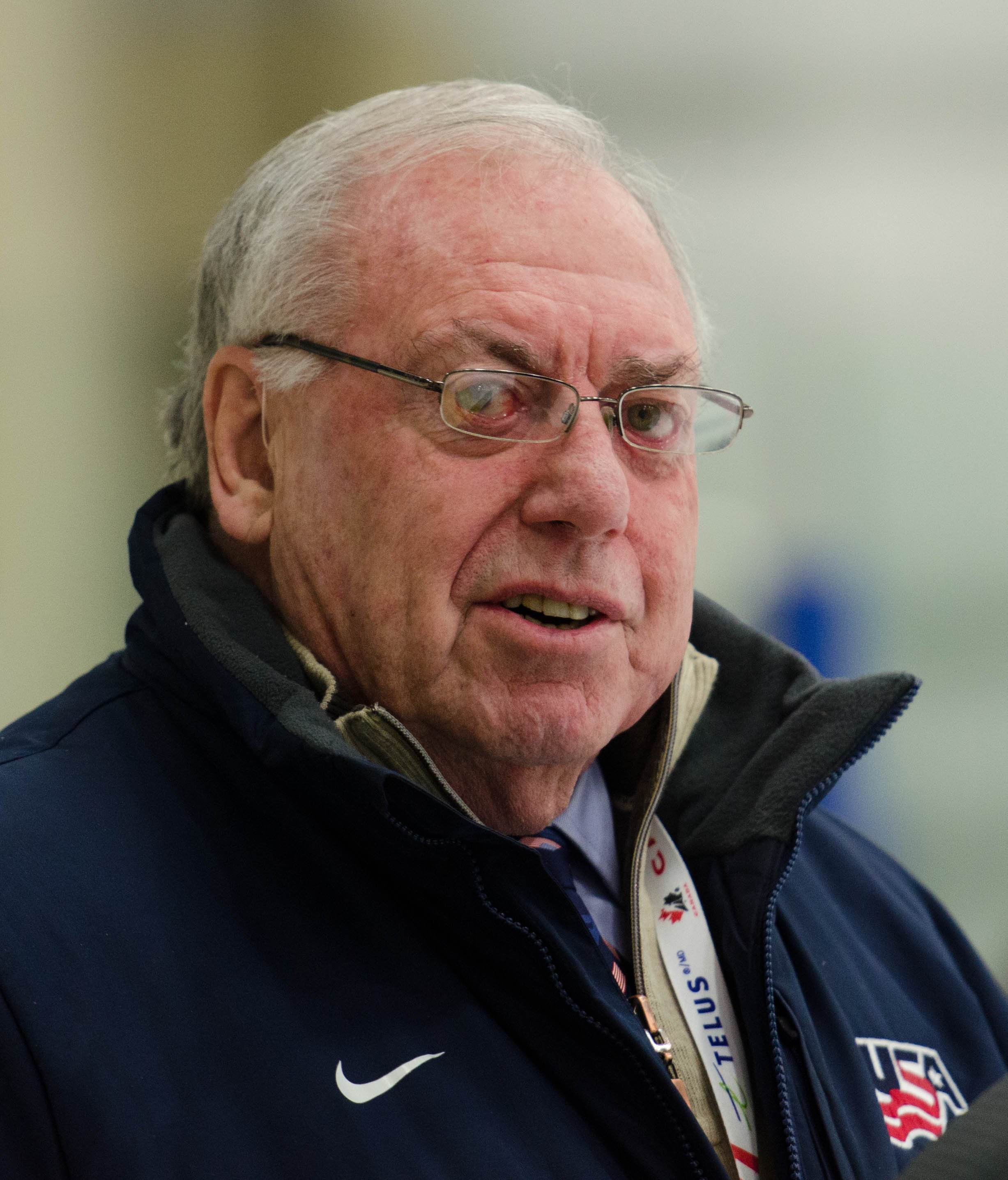
Jeff Sauer, 1971–72 & 1974–75 Coach of the Year

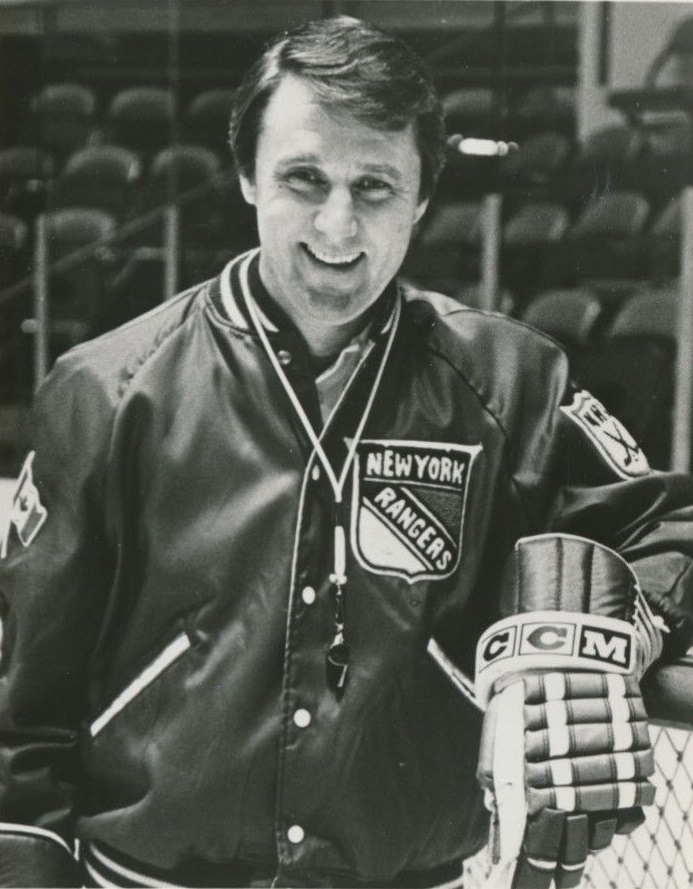
Herb Brooks, 1973–74 Coach of the Year

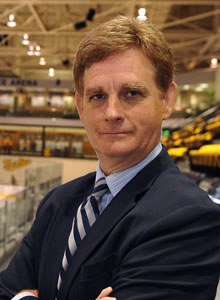
Mel Pearson, 2011–12 Coach of the Year

=== Winners ===
Season	Coach	School
1959–60	John MacInnes	Michigan Tech
1960–61	Murray Armstrong	Denver
1961–62	John MacInnes (2)	Michigan Tech
1962–63	Barry Thorndycraft	North Dakota
1963–64	Al Renfrew	Michigan
1964–65	Bob Peters	North Dakota
1965–66	John MacInnes (3)	Michigan Tech
1966–67	Bill Selman	North Dakota
1967–68	Murray Armstrong (2)	Denver
1968–69	John Matchefts	Colorado College
1969–70	Glen Sonmor	Minnesota
1970–71	John MacInnes (4)	Michigan Tech
1971–72	Jeff Sauer	Colorado College
1972–73	Lefty Smith	Notre Dame
1973–74	Herb Brooks	Minnesota
1974–75	Jeff Sauer (2)	Colorado College
1975–76	John MacInnes (5)	Michigan Tech
1976–77	Bob Johnson	Wisconsin
1977–78	Marshall Johnston	Denver
1978–79	John Gasparini	North Dakota
1979–80	Brad Buetow	Minnesota
1980–81	John Giordano	Michigan
1981–82	John Gasparini (2)	North Dakota
1982–83	Mike Sertich	Minnesota–Duluth
1983–84	Mike Sertich (2)	Minnesota–Duluth
1984–85	Mike Sertich (3)	Minnesota–Duluth
1985–86	Ralph Backstrom	Denver
1986–87	John Gasparini (3)	North Dakota
1987–88	Herb Boxer	Michigan Tech
1988–89	Rick Comley	Northern Michigan
1989–90	Doug Woog	Minnesota
1990–91	Rick Comley (2)	Northern Michigan
1991–92	Brad Buetow (2)	Colorado College
1992–93	Mike Sertich (4)	Minnesota–Duluth
1993–94	Don Lucia	Colorado College
1994–95	George Gwozdecky	Denver
1995–96	Don Lucia (2)	Colorado College
1996–97	Dean Blais	North Dakota
1997–98	Craig Dahl	St. Cloud State
1998–99	Dean Blais (2)	North Dakota
1999–2000	Don Brose	Minnesota State
2000–01	Dean Blais (3)	North Dakota
2001–02	George Gwozdecky (2)	Denver
2002–03	Troy Jutting	Minnesota State
2003–04	Scott Sandelin	Minnesota–Duluth
2004–05	George Gwozdecky (3)	Denver
2005–06^{†}	Bob Motzko	St. Cloud State
2005–06^{†}	Don Lucia (3)	Minnesota
2006–07^{†}	Jamie Russell	Michigan Tech
2006–07^{†}	Bob Motzko (2)	St. Cloud State
2007–08	Troy Jutting (2)	Minnesota State
2008–09	Dave Hakstol	North Dakota
2009–10	George Gwozdecky (4)	Denver
2010–11	Dean Blais (4)	Nebraska–Omaha
2011–12	Mel Pearson	Michigan Tech
2012–13	Mike Hastings	Minnesota State
2013–14	Bob Daniels	Ferris State
2014–15	Mike Hastings (2)	Minnesota State
2015–16	Mel Pearson (2)	Michigan Tech
2016–17	Tom Serratore	Bemidji State
2017–18	Grant Potulny	Northern Michigan
2018–19	Mike Hastings (3)	Minnesota State
2019–20	Tom Serratore (2)	Bemidji State
2020–21	Mike Hastings (4)	Minnesota State

=== Winners by school ===
School	Winners	Years
North Dakota	10	1962–63, 1964–65, 1966–67, 1978–79, 1981–82, 1986–87, 1996–97, 1998–99, 2000–01, 2008–09
Michigan Tech	9	1959–60, 1961–62, 1965–66, 1970–71, 1975–76, 1987–88, 2005–06^{†}, 2011–12, 2015–16
Denver	8	1960–61, 1967–68, 1977–78, 1985–86, 1994–95, 2001–02, 2004–05^{†}, 2009–10
Minnesota State	7	1999–2000, 2002–03, 2007–08, 2012–13, 2014–15, 2018–19, 2020–21
Colorado College	6	1968–69, 1971–72, 1974–75, 1991–92, 1993–94, 1995–96
Minnesota	5	1969–70, 1973–74, 1979–80, 1989–90, 2005–06^{†}
Minnesota–Duluth	5	1982–83, 1983–84, 1984–85, 1992–93, 2003–04
Northern Michigan	3	1988–89, 1990–91, 2017–18
St. Cloud State	3	1997–98, 2004–05^{†}, 2006–07
Bemidji State	2	2016–17, 2019–20
Michigan	2	1963–64, 1980–81
Notre Dame	1	1972–73
Wisconsin	1	1976–77
Nebraska–Omaha	1	2010–11
Ferris State	1	2013–14

== Statistical leaders ==
=== Scoring leaders ===
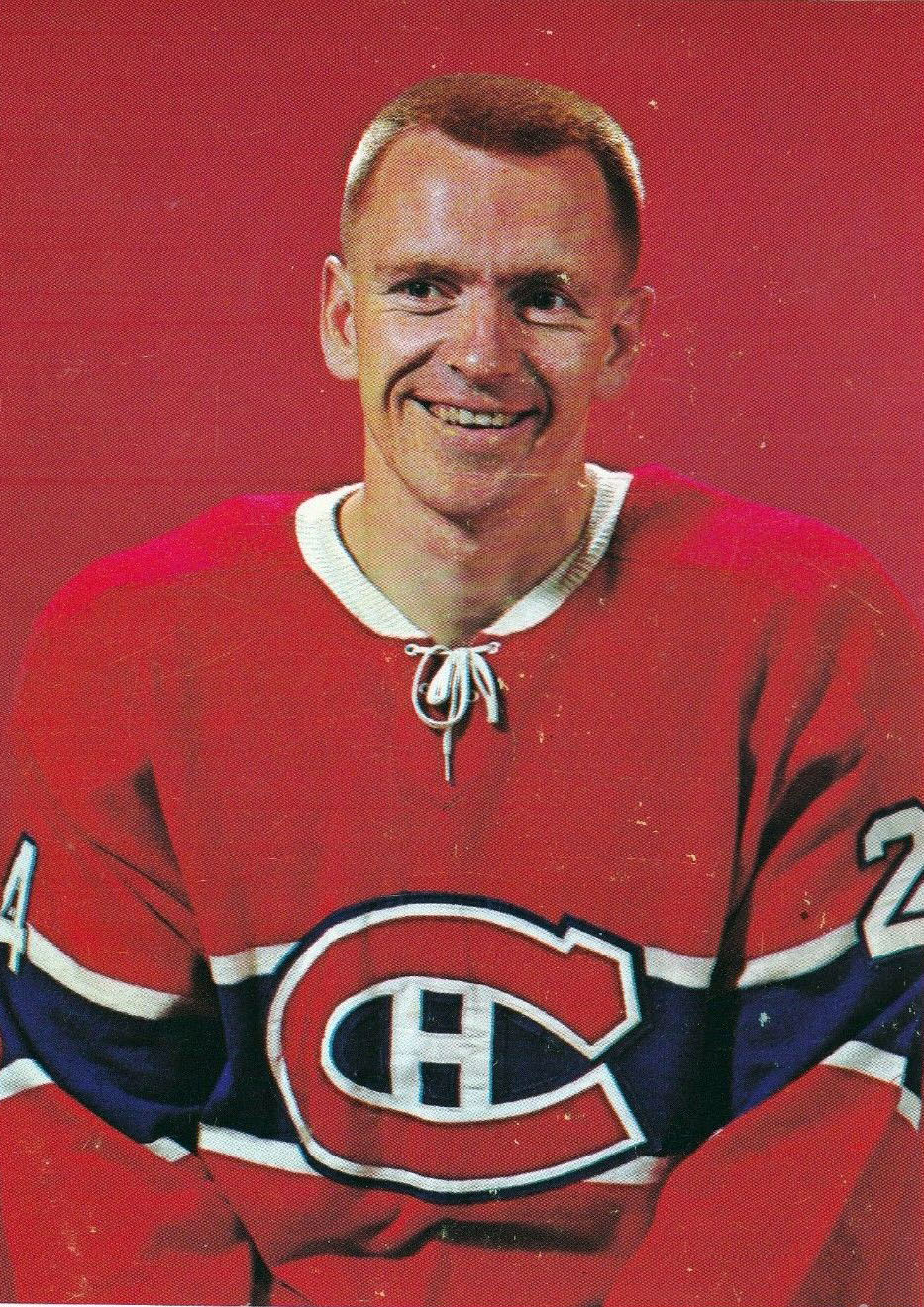
Red Berenson, 1961–62 scoring leader

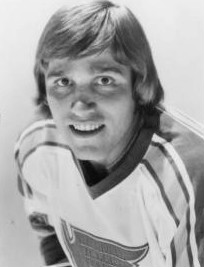
Doug Palazzari, 1971–72 scoring leader

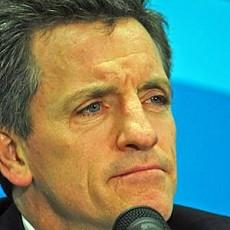
Mark Johnson, 1977–78 scoring leader

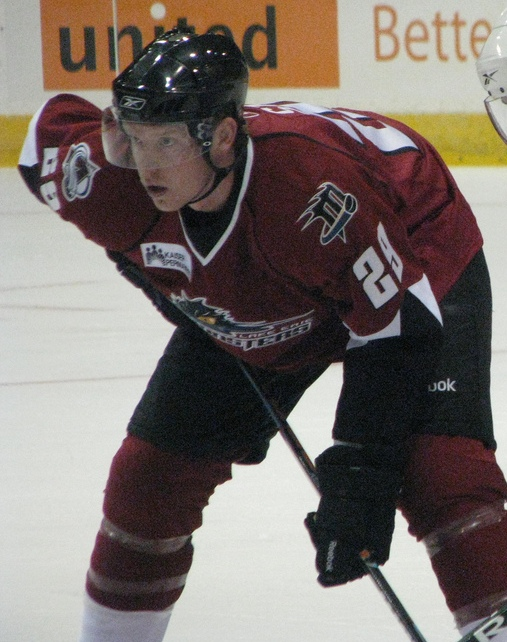
Ryan Stoa, 2008–09 scoring leader

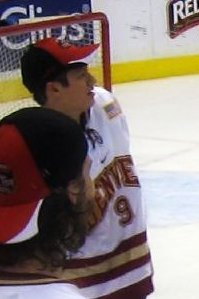
Rhett Rakhshani, 2009–10 scoring leader

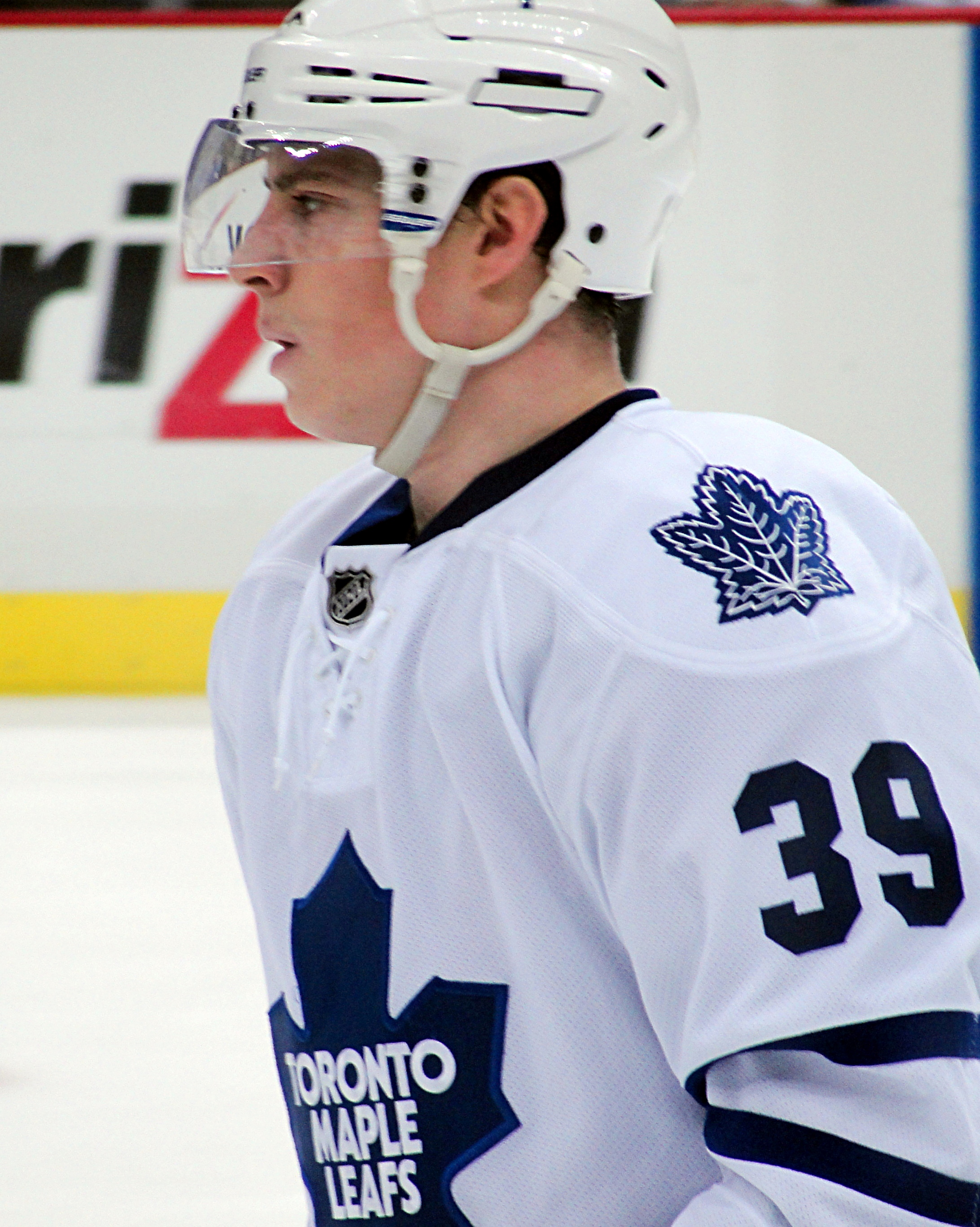
Matt Frattin, 2010–11 scoring leader

The scoring champion was determined based on all games from 1951–52 until 1961–62. Since, only statistics from conference games are included.

Season	Player	Position	School	Games	Goals	Assists	Points
1951–52	Ron Hartwell	Forward	Colorado College	23	40	27	67
1952–53	John Mayasich	Forward	Minnesota	27	42	36	78
1953–54	John Mayasich	Forward	Minnesota	28	29	49	78
1954–55	John Mayasich	Forward	Minnesota	30	41	39	80
1955–56	John Andrews	Forward	Colorado College	27	27	25	52
1956–57	Bill Reichart	Forward	North Dakota	22	24	16	40
1957–58	Bill Hay	Forward	Colorado College	16	16	32	48
1958–59	no league play						
1959–60	Bill Masterton	Forward	Denver	17	17	27	44
1960–61	Jerry Walker	Forward	Denver	18	29	15	44
1961–62	Red Berenson	Forward	Michigan	18	24	17	41
1962–63	Lou Nanne	Defenseman	Minnesota	20	9	23	32
1963–64	Gordon Wilkie	Forward	Michigan	14	8	22	30
1964–65	Mel Wakabayashi	Forward	Michigan	18	13	17	30
1965–66	Doug Volmar	Forward	Michigan State	20	18	23	41
1966–67	Keith Christiansen	Forward	Minnesota–Duluth	23	15	31	46
1967–68	Bill Klatt	Forward	Minnesota	22	18	12	30
1968–69	George Morrison	Forward	Denver	20	26	13	39
1969–70	George Morrison	Forward	Denver	22	18	19	37
1970–71	Vic Venasky	Forward	Denver	22	14	25	39
1971–72	Doug Palazzari	Forward	Colorado College	28	27	30	57
1972–73	Eddie Bumbacco	Forward	Notre Dame	28	31	34	65
1973–74	Steve Colp	Forward	Michigan State	28	31	41	72
1974–75	Tom Ross	Forward	Michigan State	32	32	48	80
1975–76	Tom Ross	Forward	Michigan State	32	41	42	83
1976–77	Dave Debol	Forward	Michigan	32	34	37	71
1977–78^{†}	Mark Johnson	Forward	Wisconsin	31	39	31	70
1977–78^{†}	Mike Eaves	Forward	Wisconsin	32	25	45	70
1978–79	Dave Delich	Forward	Colorado College	30	25	45	70
1979–80	Tim Harrer	Forward	Minnesota	32	45	24	69
1980–81	Steve Ulseth	Forward	Minnesota	28	28	35	63
1981–82	Ed Beers	Forward	Denver	26	30	19	49
1982–83	Scott Bjugstad	Forward	Minnesota	26	21	35	56
1983–84	Bill Watson	Forward	Minnesota–Duluth	23	17	38	55
1984–85	Bill Watson	Forward	Minnesota–Duluth	33	37	43	80
1985–86	Dallas Gaume	Forward	Denver	34	24	49	73
1986–87	Tony Hrkac	Forward	North Dakota	35	36	50	86
1987–88	Steve Johnson	Forward	North Dakota	35	27	44	71
1988–89	Shawn Harrison	Forward	Michigan Tech	35	16	30	46
1989–90	Dave Shields	Forward	Denver	28	21	29	50
1990–91	Scott Beattie	Forward	Northern Michigan	31	33	31	64
1991–92	Jim Hiller	Forward	Northern Michigan	32	24	46	70
1992–93	Derek Plante	Forward	Minnesota–Duluth	29	29	37	66
1993–94	Chris Marinucci	Forward	Minnesota–Duluth	32	27	26	53
1994–95	Brian Bonin	Forward	Minnesota	32	27	19	46
1995–96	Brian Bonin	Forward	Minnesota	32	25	39	64
1996–97^{†}	Brian Swanson	Forward	Colorado College	32	15	27	42
1996–97^{†}	Mike Crowley	Defenseman	Minnesota	32	5	37	42
1997–98^{†}	Reggie Berg	Forward	Minnesota	28	17	17	34
1997–98^{†}	Brian Swanson	Forward	Colorado College	28	11	23	34
1998–99	Jason Blake	Forward	North Dakota	28	20	29	49
1999–2000	Jeff Panzer	Forward	North Dakota	28	14	30	44
2000–01	Jeff Panzer	Forward	North Dakota	28	16	33	49
2001–02	Mark Hartigan	Forward	St. Cloud State	28	24	25	49
2002–03	Peter Sejna	Forward	Colorado College	28	21	32	53
2003–04^{†}	Junior Lessard	Forward	Minnesota–Duluth	28	19	20	39
2003–04^{†}	Brandon Bochenski	Forward	North Dakota	28	16	23	39
2004–05	Marty Sertich	Forward	Colorado College	28	17	25	42
2005–06	Paul Stastny	Forward	Denver	28	15	29	44
2006–07	Ryan Duncan	Forward	North Dakota	28	22	17	39
2007–08	Ryan Lasch	Forward	St. Cloud State	28	17	17	34
2008–09	Ryan Stoa	Forward	Minnesota	27	19	17	36
2009–10	Rhett Rakhshani	Forward	Denver	28	15	20	35
2010–11	Matt Frattin	Forward	North Dakota	28	22	18	40
2011–12	Jack Connolly	Forward	Minnesota–Duluth	28	16	27	43
2012–13	Ryan Walters	Forward	Nebraska–Omaha	28	16	24	40
2013–14	Cody Kunyk	Forward	Alaska	28	17	17	34
2014–15	Tanner Kero	Forward	Michigan Tech	28	13	21	34
2015–16	Alex Petan	Forward	Michigan Tech	27	16	13	29
2016–17	Gerald Mayhew	Forward	Ferris State	26	15	15	30
2017–18	C. J. Suess	Forward	Minnesota State	28	19	17	36
2018–19	Troy Loggins	Forward	Northern Michigan	28	20	12	32
2019–20	Griffin Loughran	Forward	Northern Michigan	28	20	12	32
2020–21	André Ghantous	Forward	Northern Michigan	14	6	14	20

==== Winners by school ====
School	Leaders	Years
Minnesota	13	1952–53, 1953–54, 1954–55, 1962–63, 1967–68, 1979–80, 1980–81, 1982–83, 1994–95, 1995–96, 1996–97^{†}, 1997–98^{†}, 2008–09
Denver	10	1959–60, 1960–61, 1968–69, 1969–70, 1970–71, 1981–82, 1985–86, 1989–90, 2005–06, 2009–10
Colorado College	9	1951–52, 1955–56, 1957–58, 1971–72, 1978–79, 1996–97^{†}, 1997–98^{†}, 2002–03, 2004–05
North Dakota	9	1956–57, 1986–87, 1987–88, 1998–99, 1999–2000, 2000–01, 2003–04^{†}, 2006–07, 2010–11
Minnesota–Duluth	7	1966–67, 1983–84, 1984–85, 1992–93, 1993–94, 2003–04^{†}, 2011–12
Northern Michigan	5	1990–91, 1991–92, 2018–19, 2019–20, 2020–21
Michigan	4	1961–62, 1963–64, 1964–65, 1976–77
Michigan State	4	1965–66, 1973–74, 1974–75, 1975–76
Michigan Tech	3	1988–89, 2014–15, 2015–16
Wisconsin	2	1977–78^{†}, 1977–78^{†}
St. Cloud State	2	2001–02, 2007–08
Notre Dame	1	1972–73
Nebraska–Omaha	1	2012–13
Alaska	1	2013–14
Ferris State	1	2016–17
Minnesota State	1	2017–18

=== Goaltending leaders ===
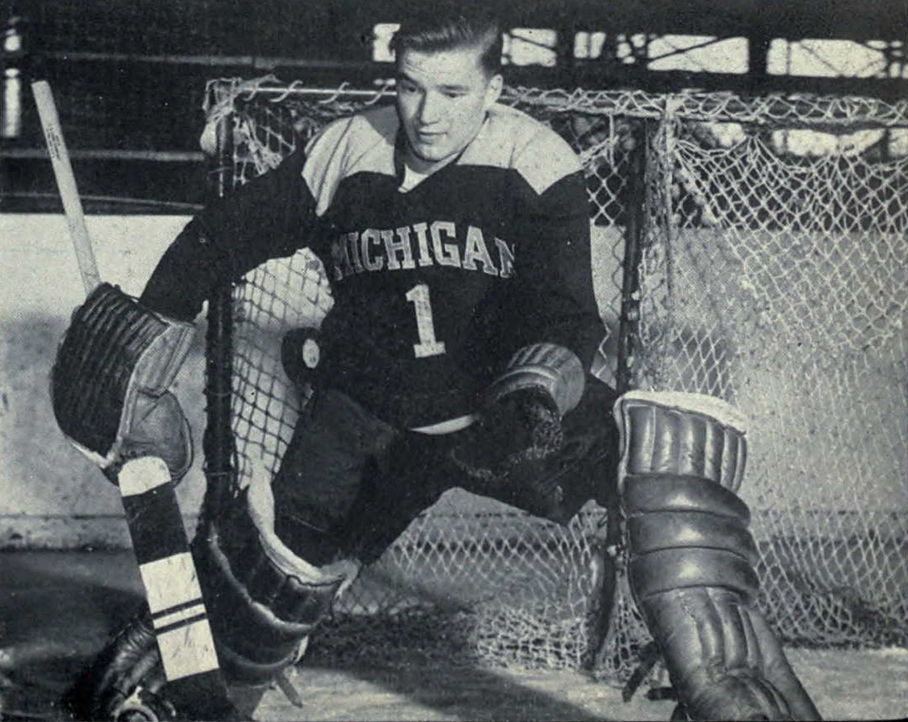
Willard Ikola, 1951–52 top goaltender

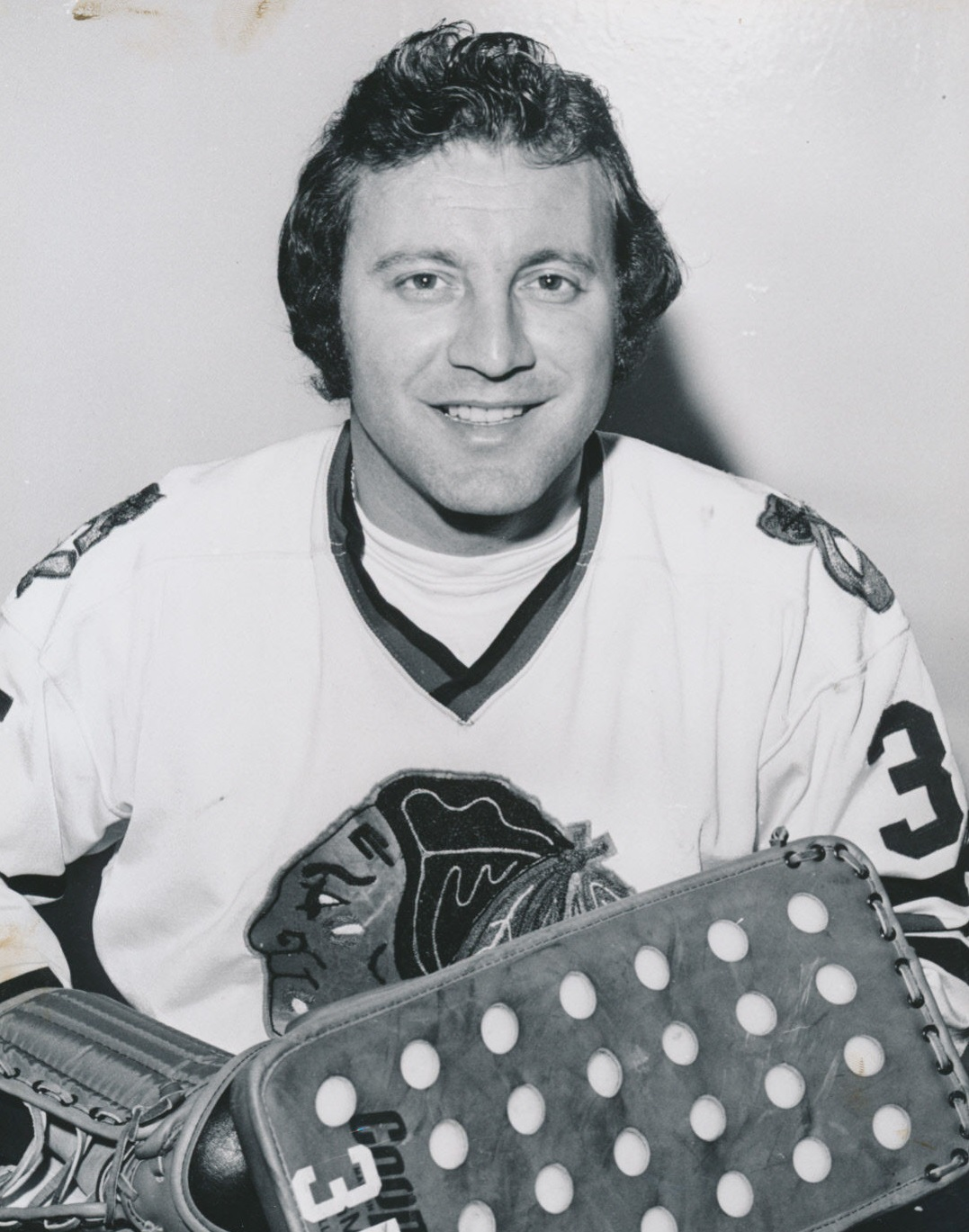
Tony Esposito, top goaltender in 1964–65, 1965–66, & 1966–67

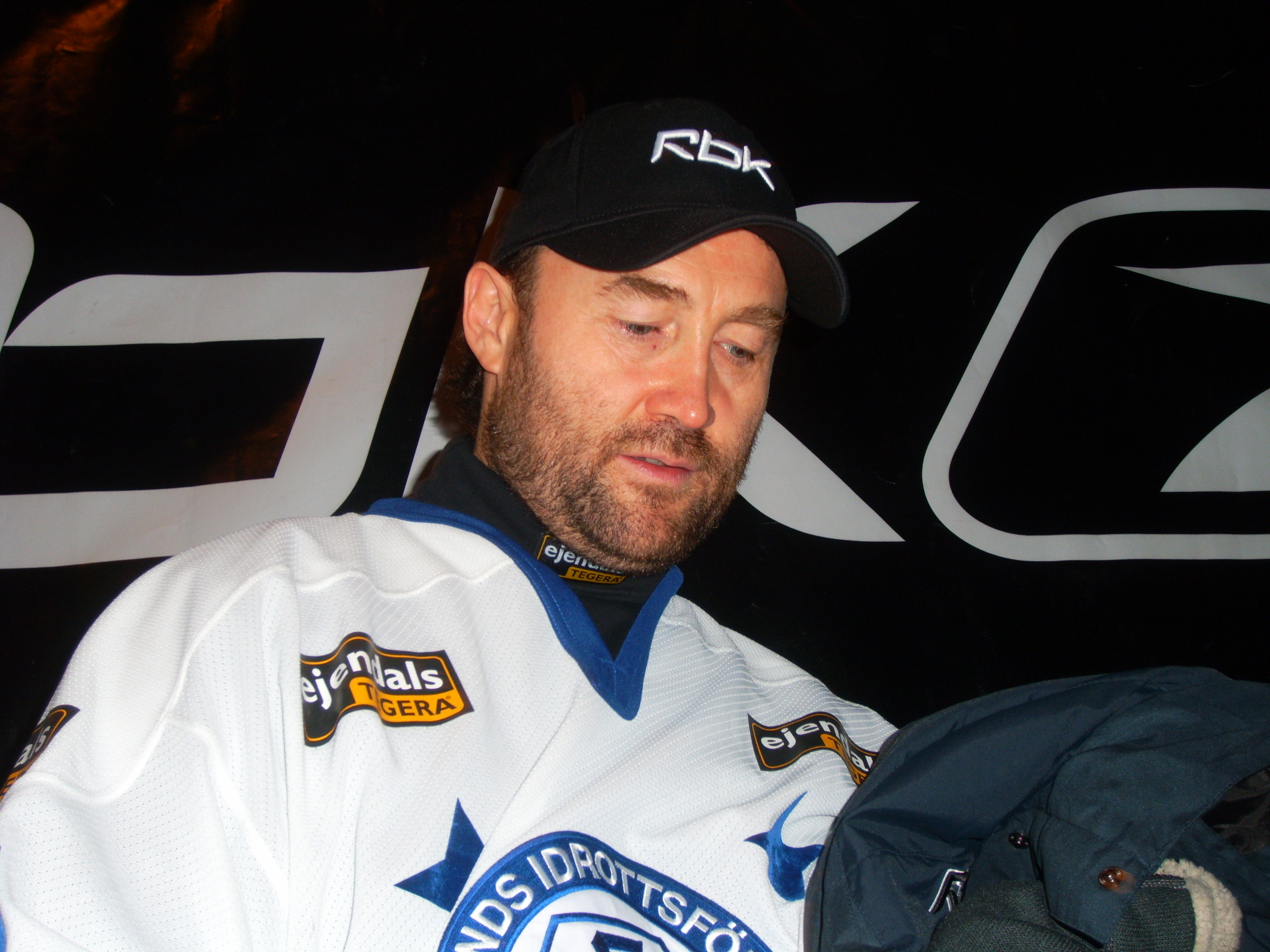
Ed Belfour, 1986–87 top goaltender

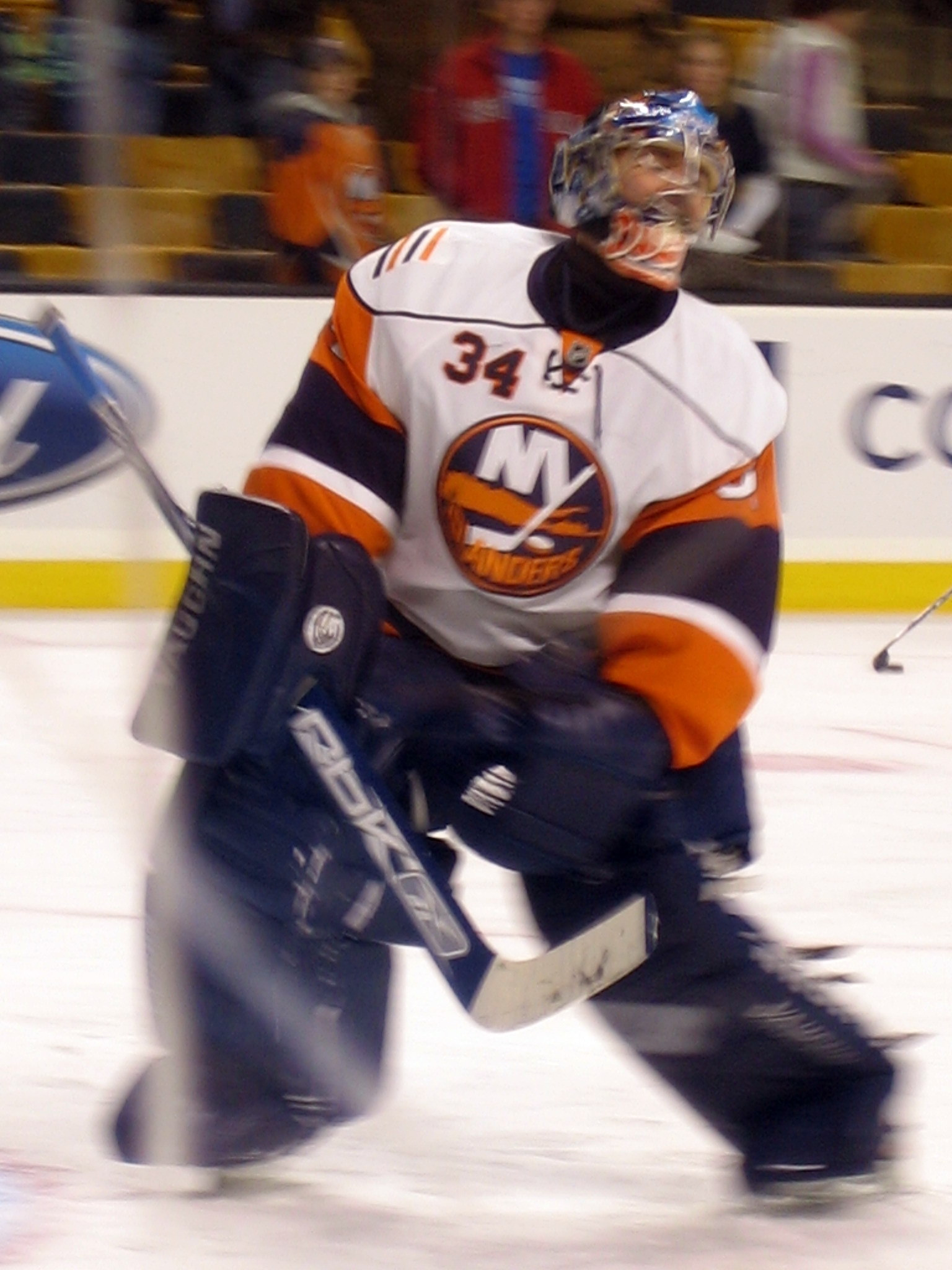
Wade Dubielewicz, top goaltender in 2000–01 and 2001–02

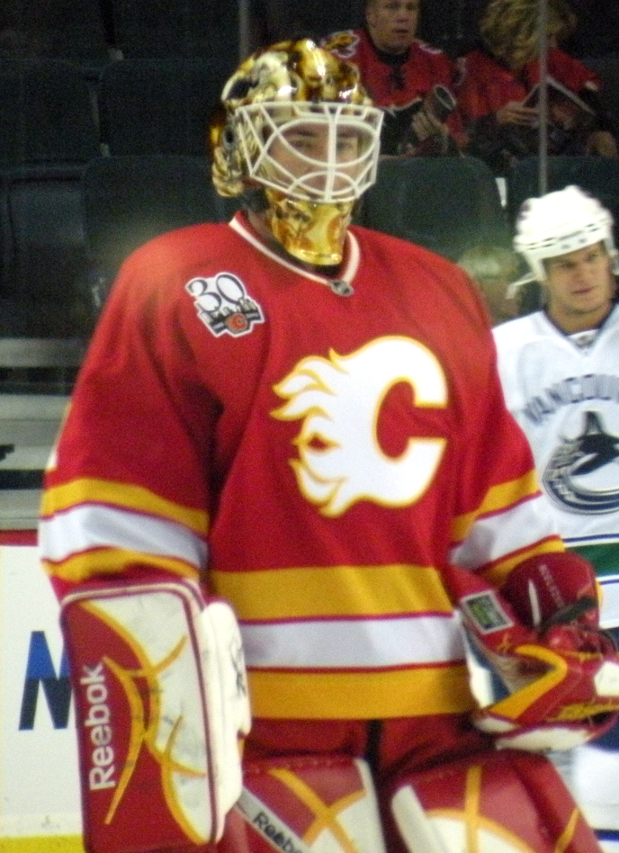
Curtis McElhinney, top goaltender in 2002–03 and 2004–05

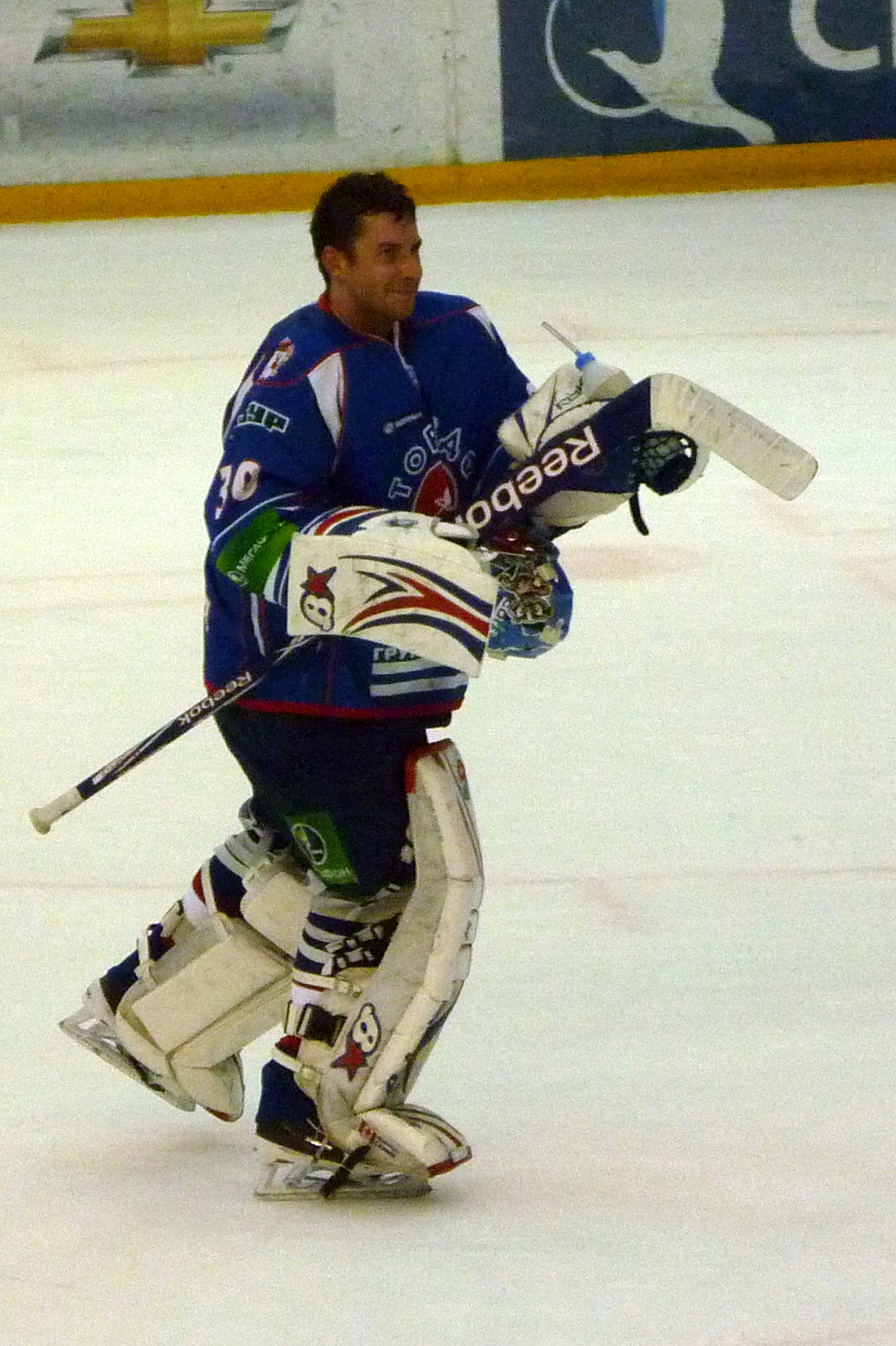
Bernd Brückler, top goaltender in 2003–04

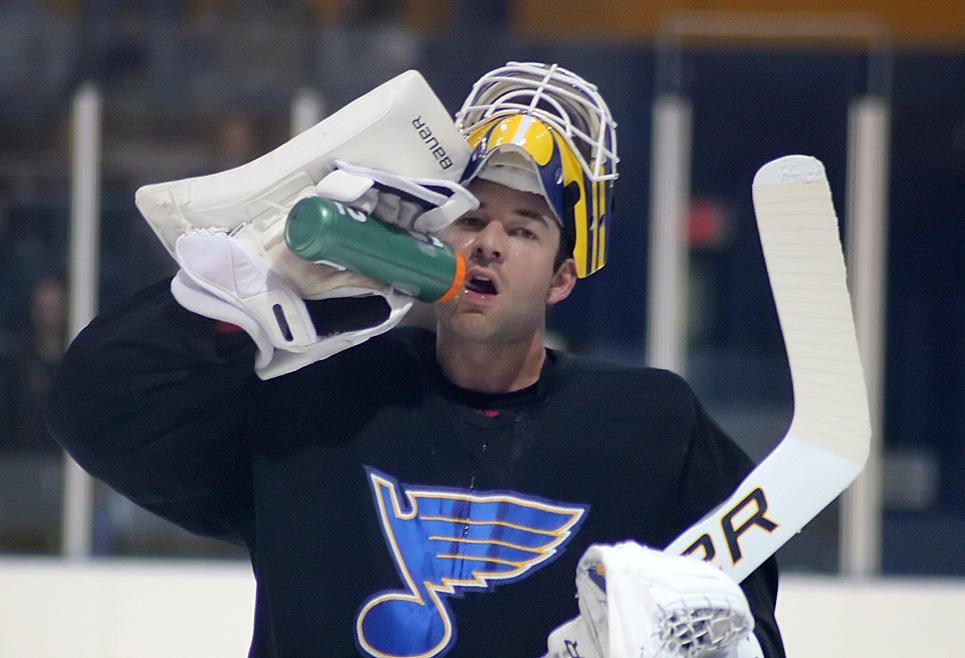
Brian Elliott, top goaltender in 2005–06 and 2006–07

The goaltending champion was based on all games from 1951–52 until 1955–56 and based on only league games since.

Season	Player	School	Games	GAA
1951–52	Willard Ikola	Michigan	26	2.66
1952–53	Jim Mattson	Minnesota	27	2.36
1953–54	Jim Mattson	Minnesota	26	2.76
1954–55	Jeff Simus	Colorado College	24	2.92
1955–56	Lorne Howes	Michigan	22	1.95
1956–57	Ross Childs	Michigan	11	2.73
1957–58	Bob Peabody	North Dakota	15	3.13
1958–59	no league play			
1959–60	George Kirkwood	Denver	22	2.32
1960–61	George Kirkwood	Denver	18	1.72
1961–62^{†}	Dave Butts	Michigan	9	2.67
1961–62^{†}	Bob Gray	Michigan	9	2.67
1962–63	Garry Bauman	Michigan Tech	20	2.65
1963–64	Buddy Blom	Denver	10	1.70
1964–65	Tony Esposito	Michigan Tech	10	2.00
1965–66	Tony Esposito	Michigan Tech	12	2.00
1966–67	Tony Esposito	Michigan Tech	11	2.45
1967–68	Gerry Powers	Denver	18	1.78
1968–69	Rick Duffett	Michigan State	10	2.40
1969–70	Wayne Thomas	Wisconsin	13	3.00
1970–71	Morris Trewin	Michigan Tech	11	2.55
1971–72	Jim Makey	Wisconsin	21.3	3.29
1972–73	Ron Grahame	Denver	27	2.93
1973–74	Brad Shelstad	Minnesota	25	3.32
1974–75	Larry Thayer	Minnesota	16	2.50
1975–76	Jeff Tscherne	Minnesota	23.7	3.50
1976–77	Julian Baretta	Wisconsin	17	3.02
1977–78	Ernie Glanville	Denver	14	2.57
1978–79	Bob Iwabuchi	North Dakota	16	3.13
1979–80	Bob Iwabuchi	North Dakota	15	3.85
1980–81	Frank Krieber	Michigan Tech	16	3.27
1981–82	Jon Casey	North Dakota	12	2.38
1982–83	Jon Casey	North Dakota	12	2.63
1983–84	Rick Kosti	Minnesota–Duluth	22	2.92
1984–85	John Blue	Minnesota	22	3.00
1985–86	John Blue	Minnesota	21	3.08
1986–87	Ed Belfour	North Dakota	22	2.37
1987–88	Robb Stauber	Minnesota	35	2.91
1988–89	Robb Stauber	Minnesota	25	2.33
1989–90	Duane Derksen	Wisconsin	26	3.72
1990–91	Jeff Stolp	Minnesota	24	2.71
1991–92	Jeff Stolp	Minnesota	28	2.87
1992–93	Jim Carey	Wisconsin	21	2.97
1993–94	Jim Carey	Wisconsin	29	3.09
1994–95	Jeff Callinan	Minnesota	30	2.74
1995–96	Judd Lambert	Colorado College	14	2.05
1996–97	Aaron Schweitzer	North Dakota	15	2.45
1997–98	Karl Goehring	North Dakota	20	2.23
1998–99	Gregg Naumenko	Alaska–Anchorage	25	2.23
1999–2000	Karl Goehring	North Dakota	20	1.79
2000–01	Wade Dubielewicz	Denver	22	2.24
2001–02	Wade Dubielewicz	Denver	15	1.80
2002–03	Curtis McElhinney	Colorado College	25	2.19
2003–04	Bernd Brückler	Wisconsin	27	2.11
2004–05	Curtis McElhinney	Colorado College	15	2.09
2005–06	Brian Elliott	Wisconsin	21	1.84
2006–07	Brian Elliott	Wisconsin	25	1.94
2007–08	Jean-Philippe Lamoureux	North Dakota	28	1.74
2008–09	Alex Stalock	Minnesota–Duluth	28	2.39
2009–10	Marc Cheverie	Denver	25	2.05
2010–11	Aaron Dell	North Dakota	24	1.97
2011–12	Kent Patterson	Minnesota	28	2.06
2012–13	Stephon Williams	Minnesota State	28	1.83
2013–14	Cole Huggins	Minnesota State	24	1.73
2014–15	Stephon Williams (2)	Minnesota State	28	1.66
2015–16	Cole Huggins (2)	Minnesota State	14	1.46
2016–17	Michael Bitzer	Bemidji State	27	1.40

==== Winners by school ====
School	Leaders	Years
Minnesota	13	1952–53, 1953–54, 1973–74, 1974–75, 1975–76, 1984–85, 1985–86, 1987–88, 1988–89, 1990–91, 1991–92, 1994–95, 2011–12
North Dakota	11	1957–58, 1978–79, 1979–80, 1981–82, 1982–83, 1986–87, 1996–97, 1997–98, 1999–2000, 2007–08, 2010–11
Denver	9	1959–60, 1960–61, 1963–64, 1967–68, 1972–73, 1977–78, 2000–01, 2001–02, 2009–10
Wisconsin	9	1969–70, 1971–72, 1976–77, 1989–90, 1992–93, 1993–94, 2003–04, 2005–06, 2006–07
Michigan Tech	6	1962–63, 1964–65, 1965–66, 1966–67, 1970–71, 1980–81
Michigan	5	1951–52, 1955–56, 1956–57, 1961–62^{†}, 1961–62^{†}
Colorado College	4	1954–55, 1995–96, 2002–03, 2004–05
Minnesota State	4	2012–13, 2013–14, 2014–15, 2015–16
Minnesota–Duluth	2	1983–84, 2008–09
Michigan State	1	1968–69
Alaska–Anchorage	1	1998–99
Bemidji State	1	2016–17
