= 1958–59 North Dakota Fighting Sioux men's ice hockey season =

National champion 1959 NCAA Tournament, champion
- Conference: Independent
- Home ice: Winter Sports Building

Record
- Overall: 20–10–1
- Home: 10–3–1
- Road: 8–7–0
- Neutral: 2–0–0

Coaches and captains
- Head coach: Bob May
- Assistant coaches: Barry Thorndycraft
- Captain: Bill Steenson
- Alternate captain(s): Julian Brunetta; Joe Poole

The 1958–59 North Dakota Fighting Sioux men's ice hockey team represented the University of North Dakota in college ice hockey. In its 2nd year under head coach Bob May, the team compiled a 20–10–1 record and reached the NCAA tournament for the second time. The Fighting Sioux defeated Michigan State 4–3 in overtime to win the championship game at the RPI Field House in Troy, New York, the first national title hosted by an eastern school.

== Season ==
Coming off of their first trip to the NCAA tournament, North Dakota was hoping to improve on their Runner-Up finish. First, however, the Fighting Sioux had to deal with the collapse of their conference. While programs like North Dakota and Denver had fully embraced the blueprint that Michigan had lain down by recruiting mostly overaged Canadian players, Minnesota head coach John Mariucci had made it a policy for his team to stick with American players and soon found his team left behind. Rather than join the rest of the teams Minnesota withdrew from the WIHL, taking Michigan and Michigan State with them to form the ice hockey division of the Big Ten. Rather than form a small conference of their own the remaining four teams played as independents for the 1958–59 season.

Despite being without a conference, North Dakota played a very similar schedule to the one they had the year before. They still played each of the 6 other former WIHL teams and divided their time fairly evenly at home and on the road. After opening the season with two wins against the senior Winnipeg Maroons, North Dakota hit the road and split a pair of game at Michigan State. They returned home to take on Denver in a rematch of last season's national championship and took both close contests 4–3 with one win coming in extra time. After jumping out to a 5-1 start the Fighting Sioux slumped over the holiday break, tying then losing to the US National Team before dropping a match on the road with the Warroad Lakers. They lost their next game at home to Michigan Tech before finally stemming the tide with an overtime win the next night. Sporting a pedestrian 5-4-1 record UND went on an extended road trip through the Great Lakes.

The team's first stop was in Duluth where they took both games against an inferior Bulldogs squad. Afterwards they headed Ann Arbor and in the first game against the Wolverines the Fighting Sioux were beating up the home team so badly that the crowd couldn't contain themselves and ended up getting into a fight with the visitors. The game was stopped with 5:20 left in the third period and the remainder of the time was cancelled. The next night was a bit more subdued but North Dakota dropped the contest 2–4. After taking a week off, the team returned to the area to take on Minnesota and Michigan Tech, splitting both series and beginning a six-game homestand with a respectable 11-7-1 record.

North Dakota welcomed Colorado College and won both games against the once-fearsome Tigers. After splitting yet another series against Michigan State the Fighting Sioux finished their home schedule with a pair of wins against Minnesota. For their final weekend North Dakota headed to Colorado to face the Pioneers and Tigers twice each in a 5-day span. Despite fatigue and elevation North Dakota acquitted themselves well by splitting both series and ending with an 18-10-1 record.

With the dissolution of the WIHL the NCAA selection committee had to use a new metric to determine which two western team would make the tournament. In the end they settled on using a similar method to how they choose eastern teams; they gave the top seed to the Big Ten Champion, Michigan State, then picked the best remaining team as the second semifinalist. While Michigan Tech had split its series with North Dakota during the season they finished with a worse record. Denver, on the other hand, ended with a stellar 22-5-1 mark and possessed the best offense in the country. There was, however, a problem. While most teams had a relatively balanced schedule, Denver had played only five of its 26 games on the road. Additionally, three of those game came against Colorado College. This meant that during the entire season Denver left their state only once and when they did they lost both game against North Dakota. Because of Denver's rather sizable home ice advantage their schedule was seen as far less strenuous than the Fighting Sioux's. In the end it may have been UND's 3–1 record against the Pioneers that tipped the scales in their favor but in any event North Dakota was awarded the second western seed, much to the displeasure of the Denver faithful.

North Dakota headed to the eastern time zone for the first time all season to take on Tri-State League champion St. Lawrence. The Saints battled the Fighting Sioux to a 3-3 tie after regulation and were hoping to head to their first National Title in their fourth appearance but a goal by UND's Guy LaFrance sent the Fighting Sioux back to the championship game. In the other semifinal Michigan State dropped Boston College by an identical 4–3 score, though they didn't require extra time. In the fifth meeting that season, the Spartans opened the scoring in a close-checking first period, ending with a one-goal advantage due to an Ed Pollesel marker. In the second period North Dakota found their legs and completely took the game over, outshooting MSU 17–4 and outscoring their opponent 3–0. Once the third period began the pendulum swung completely in the other direction and it was Sparty's turn to take over, scoring twice in the final twelve minutes of play to tie the game and send the national championship into overtime. North Dakota hadn't lost an overtime game in over two years and head coach Bob May confessed to being nervous about that statistic. His team may have picked up on that because they didn't record a shot for more than four minutes but when they did they made it count and Reg Morelli scored to give the Fighting Sioux their first national title.

Morelli was awarded the tournament MOP and was joined by Ed Thomlinson on the All-Tournament first team while Ralph Lyndon and Joe Poole appeared on the second team.

Bill Steenson was the only player on the team to find his way onto the AHCA All-American West Team and while Bob May received a great deal of support for the Spencer Penrose Award the trophy went to Harry Cleverly.

After the season, May left the team to coach minor professional hockey for a year before entering dental school. The team was not left in the lurch, however, as assistant coach Barry Thorndycraft took over the reins.

== Standings ==
1958–59 NCAA Independent ice hockey standings
	Intercollegiate							Overall					
	GP	W	L	T	Pct.	GF	GA	GP	W	L	T	GF	GA
Amherst	–	–	–	–	–	–	–	17	10	7	0	–	–
American International	–	–	–	–	–	–	–	20	6	14	0	–	–
Army	19	9	9	1	.500	78	64	20	9	10	1	79	70
Boston College	–	–	–	–	–	–	–	28	20	8	0	136	105
Boston University	23	13	8	2	.609	106	81	23	13	8	2	106	81
Bowdoin	–	–	–	–	–	–	–	19	7	11	1	–	–
Brown	–	–	–	–	–	–	–	24	10	14	0	84	109
Colby	–	–	–	–	–	–	–	19	10	8	1	–	–
Colgate	–	–	–	–	–	–	–	8	2	6	0	33	68
Colorado College	–	–	–	–	–	–	–	23	6	14	3	86	110
Cornell	–	–	–	–	–	–	–	21	4	16	1	45	166
Dartmouth	–	–	–	–	–	–	–	25	17	8	0	126	97
Denver	–	–	–	–	–	–	–	28	22	5	1	194	86
Hamilton	–	–	–	–	–	–	–	18	8	9	1	–	–
Harvard	–	–	–	–	–	–	–	25	12	9	4	126	79
Massachusetts	–	–	–	–	–	–	–	12	3	9	0	36	52
Merrimack	–	–	–	–	–	–	–	12	7	5	0	105	67
MIT	–	–	–	–	–	–	–	13	1	11	1	–	–
Michigan Tech	–	–	–	–	–	–	–	27	16	10	1	116	88
New Hampshire	–	–	–	–	–	–	–	19	14	5	0	99	49
North Dakota	26	18	8	0	.692	104	83	31	20	10	1	125	103
Northeastern	–	–	–	–	–	–	–	24	12	11	0	98	99
Norwich	–	–	–	–	–	–	–	18	8	10	0	–	–
Princeton	–	–	–	–	–	–	–	23	6	16	1	73	102
Providence	–	–	–	–	–	–	–	21	7	13	1	95	94
St. Olaf	–	–	–	–	–	–	–	13	10	3	0	–	–
Tufts	–	–	–	–	–	–	–	14	6	7	1	–	–
Williams	–	–	–	–	–	–	–	17	7	10	0	–	–
Yale	–	–	–	–	–	–	–	21	11	9	1	94	71

== Schedule ==
Date	Opponent	Site	Result	Record
Regular Season
November 28	vs. Winnipeg Maroons*	Winter Sports Building • Grand Forks, North Dakota	W 5–3	1–0–0
November 29	vs. Winnipeg Maroons*	Winter Sports Building • Grand Forks, North Dakota	W 5–3	2–0–0
December 5	at Michigan State*	Demonstration Hall • East Lansing, Michigan	L 0–6	2–1–0
December 6	at Michigan State*	Demonstration Hall • East Lansing, Michigan	W 5–4	3–1–0
December 15	vs. Denver*	Winter Sports Building • Grand Forks, North Dakota	W 4–3 ^{OT}	4–1–0
December 16	vs. Denver*	Winter Sports Building • Grand Forks, North Dakota	W 4–3	5–1–0
December 19	vs. US National Team*	Winter Sports Building • Grand Forks, North Dakota	T 4–4 ^{OT}	5–1–1
December 20	vs. US National Team*	Winter Sports Building • Grand Forks, North Dakota	L 4–6	5–2–1
December 27	vs. Warroad Lakers*	Warroad Memorial Arena • Warroad, Minnesota	L 3–4	5–3–1
January 2	vs. Michigan Tech*	Winter Sports Building • Grand Forks, North Dakota	L 2–3	5–4–1
January 3	vs. Michigan Tech*	Winter Sports Building • Grand Forks, North Dakota	W 2–1 ^{OT}	6–4–1
January 9	at Minnesota–Duluth*	Duluth Curling and Skating Club • Duluth, Minnesota	W 4–2	7–4–1
January 10	at Minnesota–Duluth*	Duluth Curling and Skating Club • Duluth, Minnesota	W 4–1	8–4–1
January 16	at Michigan*	Weinberg Coliseum • Ann Arbor, Michigan	W 6–1†	9–4–1
January 17	at Michigan*	Weinberg Coliseum • Ann Arbor, Michigan	L 2–4	9–5–1
January 30	at Minnesota*	Williams Arena • Minneapolis, Minnesota	L 3–4	9–6–1
January 31	at Minnesota*	Williams Arena • Minneapolis, Minnesota	W 6–2	10–6–1
February 6	at Michigan Tech*	Dee Stadium • Houghton, Michigan	L 3–4	10–7–1
February 7	at Michigan Tech*	Dee Stadium • Houghton, Michigan	W 4–0	11–7–1
February 9	vs. Colorado College*	Winter Sports Building • Grand Forks, North Dakota	W 6–4	12–7–1
February 10	vs. Colorado College*	Winter Sports Building • Grand Forks, North Dakota	W 4–2	13–7–1
February 13	vs. Michigan State*	Winter Sports Building • Grand Forks, North Dakota	L 2–3	13–8–1
February 14	vs. Michigan State*	Winter Sports Building • Grand Forks, North Dakota	W 4–2	14–8–1
February 20	vs. Minnesota*	Winter Sports Building • Grand Forks, North Dakota	W 6–5	15–8–1
February 21	vs. Minnesota*	Winter Sports Building • Grand Forks, North Dakota	W 5–2	16–8–1
February 27	at Denver*	DU Arena • Denver, Colorado	W 6–4	17–8–1
February 28	at Denver*	DU Arena • Denver, Colorado	L 2–6	17–9–1
March 2	vs. Colorado College*	Broadmoor World Arena • Colorado Springs, Colorado	W 7–2	18–9–1
March 3	vs. Colorado College*	Broadmoor World Arena • Colorado Springs, Colorado	L 5–9	18–10–1
NCAA Tournament
March 13	vs. St. Lawrence*	RPI Field House • Troy, New York (National Semifinal)	W 4–3 ^{OT}	19–10–1
March 14	vs. Michigan State*	RPI Field House • Troy, New York (National championship)	W 4–3 ^{OT}	20–10–1
*Non-conference game. Source:

† The game against Michigan on January 16 was ended with 5:20 remaining in the 3rd period due to a fight involving players and fans.

== Roster and scoring statistics ==
No.	Name	Year	Position	Hometown	S/P/C	Games	Goals	Assists	Pts	PIM
9	Art Miller	Junior	F	Moose Jaw, SK	(Saskatchewan)	30	24	21	45	34
16	Reg Morelli	Junior	C	Hamilton, ON	(Ontario)	24	17	15	32	14
10	Ed Thomlinson	Junior	F	Sault Ste. Marie, ON	(Ontario)	31	14	15	29	16
11	Joe Poole	Senior	C	Thief River Falls, MN	(Minnesota)	31	13	12	25	39
8	Guy LaFrance	Junior	D/C	Fort Frances, ON	(Ontario)	31	9	16	25	144
12	Les Merrifield	Junior	F	Thunder Bay, ON	(Ontario)	31	10	11	21	49
4	Ralph Lyndon	Junior	F	Winnipeg, MB	(Manitoba)	31	6	14	20	28
14	Ron King	Junior	F	Fort Frances, ON	(Ontario)	31	7	7	14	22
2	Bill Steenson	Senior	D	Moose Jaw, SK	(Saskatchewan)	23	3	11	14	59
7	Stan Paschke	Senior	F	Grand Forks, ND	(North Dakota)	31	4	9	13	4
18	Bart Larson	Sophomore	F	Minneapolis, MN	(Minnesota)	31	5	4	9	20
19	Bernie Haley	Sophomore	F	Edmonton, AB	(Alberta)	29	4	5	9	18
6	Gerry Walford	Sophomore	C	Sudbury, ON	(Ontario)	13	3	3	6	11
5, 6	Julian Brunetta	Senior	D	Fort Frances, ON	(Ontario)	24	1	4	5	16
17	Bob Began	Senior	D/C	Eveleth, MN	(Minnesota)	31	3	1	4	2
3	Steve Thullner	Sophomore	D	Winnipeg, MB	(Manitoba)	13	1	3	4	10
15	Ken Wellen	Senior	F	Hibbing, MN	(Minnesota)	10	1	1	2	2
5	Pete Gazley	Sophomore	D	Red Deer, AB	(Alberta)	10	0	1	1	15
6, 16	Garth Perry	Sophomore	F	Red Deer, AB	(Alberta)	16	0	0	0	7
1	Bob Peabody	Senior	G	Grand Forks, ND	(North Dakota)	20	0	0	0	2
1	George Gratton	Sophomore	G	Toronto, ON	(Ontario)	15	0	0	0	6
Total							125	153	278	518

== Goaltending Statistics ==
No.	Name	Games	Minutes	Wins	Losses	Ties	Goals Against	Saves	Shut Outs	SV %	GAA
1	Bob Peabody	20	–	–	–	–	–	–	1	.868	3.10
1	George Gratton	15	–	–	–	–	–	–	0	.876	2.73
Total		31	–	–	–	–	–	–	–	–	–

== 1959 championship game ==
=== W1 Michigan State vs. W2 North Dakota ===
March 14	Michigan State	3 – 4	OT	North Dakota	RPI Field House

Scoring summary
Period	Team	Goal	Assist(s)	Time	Score
1st	MSU	Ed Pollesel	Mustonen and LaCoste	14:38	1–0 MSU
2nd	UND	Ralph Lyndon	Morelli and Miller	27:21	1–1
2nd	UND	Gerry Walford	King and Haley	28:57	2–1 UND
2nd	UND	Stan Paschke	Lyndon	29:37	3–1 UND
3rd	MSU	Andre LaCoste	Roberts and Norman	48:05	3–2 UND
3rd	MSU	Jack Roberts	LaCoste	56:20	3–3
1st Overtime	UND	Reg Morelli – GW	Miller and LaFrance	64:18	4–3 UND

Shots by period
Team	1	2	3	OT	T
North Dakota	5	17	7	1	30
Michigan State	6	4	13	1	24

Goaltenders
Team	Name	Saves	Goals against	Time on ice
UND	George Gratton	21	3	
MSU	Joe Selinger	26	4	

== See also ==
- 1959 NCAA Division I Men's Ice Hockey Tournament
- List of NCAA Division I Men's Ice Hockey Tournament champions
