= Bob May (ice hockey) =

Canadian ice hockey player and coach (1927–2014)

Biographical details
- Born: June 8, 1927; Sprague, Manitoba
- Died: July 20, 2014 (aged 87); Plymouth, Minnesota

Playing career
- 1949–1951: North Dakota
- Position: Defenceman

Coaching career (HC unless noted)
- 1954–1955: Wayzata High School
- 1955–1957: Roosevelt High School
- 1957–1959: North Dakota
- 1959–1960: Minneapolis Millers
- 1974–1981: Wayzata Checkers
- 1994–1996: Wayzata High School (girls)

Head coaching record
- Overall: 44–17–2 (college)
- Tournaments: 3–1

Accomplishments and honors

Championships
- 1958 WIHL Champion; 1959 NCAA National Champion

Awards
- 1981 UND Athletic Hall of Fame; 2002 UND Athletic Hall of Fame; 2013 MGHCA Hall of Fame

Robert H. May (June 8, 1927 – July 20, 2014) was a Canadian ice hockey player and coach most well known for his brief tenure at North Dakota where he won the program's first National Champion in 1959.

== Career ==
May played for North Dakota for two seasons in the early 1950s and was named captain his final year. After graduating May turned to coaching, first leading Wayzata High School then Roosevelt High School before he was named as the bench boss for his alma mater. May was appointed coach of the Fighting Sioux when the university's president chose him instead of Ken Johannson, when the athletic directors were undecided.

May's first season brought incredible success as the Fighting Sioux won their first conference title and reached the 1958 NCAA Championship game. The WIHL was dissolved the following year, but that didn't stop May's team. They were once again invited to the tournament, bringing home the program's first national title.

May left the program to become the coach of the Minneapolis Millers for a year before he entered dental school. He became the team dentist for the Minnesota North Stars in 1968 and served in that capacity until 1983. In 1974 he became the coach of the newly formed Wayzata Checkers girls ice hockey team and led the team for its first seven seasons. In that time his team won a state title, three national titles and took first place in the 1979 Friendship Tournament held in Helsinki. Later in life he was brought back to Wayzata High School the second time to coach the first two seasons of the girls ice hockey team. He was able to help the squad to a conference championship in his second year.

Dr. Bob May served in the Army, reaching the rank of colonel. Over the course of his life May wrote four books, including; "The Hockey Drill Book," "The Hockey Road: From High School, to College, to Pro," and "Girls Hockey in Minnesota; Where To Go From Here?". May was twice inducted into the North Dakota Athletic Hall of Fame, in 1981 as an individual and in 2002 as part of the championship team. He was also a charter member of the MGHCA Hall of Fame in 2013.

== Personal life ==
Bob May died in 2014 at the age of 87 from pulmonary fibrosis. He was survived by his wife Beverley and their daughters Jan and Cathy.

== Head coaching record ==
=== College ===
Record table
Season	Team	Overall	Conference	Standing	Postseason
North Dakota Fighting Sioux (WIHL) (1957–1958)
1957–58	North Dakota	24–7–1	15–5–0	t-1st	NCAA Runner-Up
North Dakota:		24–7–1	15–5–0		
North Dakota Fighting Sioux Independent (1958–1959)
1958–59	North Dakota	20–10–1			NCAA National Champion
North Dakota:		20–10–1			
Total:		44–17–2			
National champion Postseason invitational champion Conference regular season champion Conference regular season and conference tournament champion Division regular season champion Division regular season and conference tournament champion Conference tournament champion

Sporting positions
Preceded by Al Renfrew	Head coach of the University of North Dakota; 1957–1959	Succeeded by Barry Thorndycraft
