= Central Hockey League (1952–1953) =

- Sport: Ice hockey
- Founded: 1952; 74 years ago
- Folded: 1953; 73 years ago
- No. of teams: 5
- Country: United States

The Central Hockey League was a semi-professional ice hockey league that operated from 1952 to 1953.

== History ==
After the Sioux City Sunhawks folded in the summer of '52, the American Amateur Hockey League rebranded as the Central Hockey League. The five other league members continued with the league, however, all three that were located in the twin cities folded following the season. The CHL collapsed with the remaining two teams forming the Minnesota Hockey League.

== Teams ==
- Eveleth-Virginia Rangers
- Hibbing Flyers
- Minneapolis Millers
- Rochester Mustangs
- St. Paul Saints

== Standings ==
Final standings

Note: GP = Games played; W = Wins; L = Losses; T = Ties; GF = Goals for; GA = Goals against; PTS = Points; y = clinched league title

Team	GP	W	L	T	Pts	GF	GA
y – Rochester Mustangs	32	21	8	2	44	169	113
Hibbing Flyers	32	20	11	1	41	208	153
Minneapolis Millers	31	15	14	2	32	144	140
St. Paul Saints	32	13	16	3	29	187	207
Eveleth-Virginia Rangers	31	6	25	0	12	111	206
