= Bill Steenson =

Canadian ice hockey player

- Born: June 29, 1935 Moose Jaw, Saskatchewan, Canada
- Died: June 14, 2011 (aged 75) Kimberly, British Columbia, Canada
- Height: 5 ft 10 in (178 cm)
- Weight: 175 lb (79 kg; 12 st 7 lb)
- Position: Defenseman
- Played for: North Dakota; Minneapolis Millers; Kimberley Dynamiters
- Playing career: 1956–1973

William R. Steenson (June 29, 1935 – June 14, 2011) was a Canadian ice hockey defenseman who captained North Dakota to the program's first National Championship in 1959.

== Career ==
After finishing his junior career with the Moose Jaw Canucks, Steenson accepted an athletic scholarship to the University of North Dakota in 1955. After a year with the freshman team Steenson joined the varsity squad and provided a boost to the defense. North Dakota allowed 30 fewer goals against than the year before and went from 11 wins to 18, finishing 3rd in the conference. Steenson was recognized as a major contributor to that improvement with his being named an AHCA Second Team All-American as a sophomore.

The team continued to prove strong on defense and performed wonderfully during his junior season, capturing their first WIHL championship and earning the team's first ever appearance in the NCAA Tournament. The team easily dispatched Harvard in the semifinal, but the defense faltered in the championship match against WIHL co-champion Denver. After assisting on the game's opening score, Steenson and the defense were unable to halt the Pioneer attack and their opponents scored two e-goal bursts in the second and third periods to take the championship 6–2.

Steenson was named team captain for his senior season and he would need to be a stabilizing force through the uncertainty of the campaign. Before the season had started, an argument between Denver and Minnesota over player eligibility came to a head and the three Big Ten teams left the WIHL to form their own conference. The remaining for teams decided not to continue together and played as independent programs for the season. The resulting schedule imbalances caused a great deal of confusion on the part of the teams as well as the NCAA selection committee. At the end of the season Michigan State, the winner of the Big Ten Championship, was given one of the western bids, leaving just one for the remaining teams. Denver had the best record among independents at 22–5–1, however, the team had hardly left the state of Colorado all season and when they had they fell to North Dakota. The Committee eventually chose North Dakota as the other western representative, much to the chagrin of the Denver faithful, and the Fighting Sioux made sure their selection wasn't a mistake.

While the team had made their second tournament, Steenson himself wouldn't be able to take part. He had been ruled ineligible to participate late in the season and could only watch from the sidelines as his team faced St. Lawrence in the semifinal. North Dakota got out to a 3–0 lead only to see the Saints erase the deficit in the third period. In overtime, however, Guy LaFrance, who had taken over Steenson's position on defense, fired a shot from the blue line that deflected in off of the crossbar to get the Fighting Sioux back to the championship game. The championship game had a very similar pattern with UND entering the third with a 3–1 advantage, only to see their lead vanish and overtime was required yet again. North Dakota was again victorious on their first shot of the extra session and the Fighting Sioux won their first NCAA championship.

After graduating, Steenson began his professional playing career, joining the expansion Denver Mavericks team in the IHL. After that year he would continue in the senior leagues for many years while working for Cominco, with his last recorded appearance being for the Milwaukee Admirals in 1973. After retiring as a player he turned to coaching for a few seasons before ending his hockey career. He was inducted into the North Dakota Athletic Hall of Fame in 1976.

== Personal ==
Steenson and his wife Diane had one son, Len, and remained in the Kimberly area after his retirement in 1994. In 2011 he died of brain cancer, leaving a legacy in the local hockey and skiing communities.

== Statistics ==
=== Regular season and playoffs ===
			Regular season					Playoffs
Season	Team	League	GP	G	A	Pts	PIM	GP	G	A	Pts	PIM
1953–54	Moose Jaw Canucks	WCJHL	—	—	—	—	—	—	—	—	—	—
1954–55	Moose Jaw Canucks	WCJHL	—	—	—	—	—	—	—	—	—	—
1956–57	North Dakota Fighting Sioux	WIHL	29	3	13	16	65	—	—	—	—	—
1957–58	North Dakota Fighting Sioux	WIHL	31	6	9	15	50	—	—	—	—	—
1958–59	North Dakota Fighting Sioux	NCAA	23	3	11	14	59	—	—	—	—	—
1959–60	Denver Mavericks/Minneapolis Millers	IHL	58	7	20	27	86	6	1	1	2	5
1960–61	Moose Jaw Pla-Mors	SSHL	—	—	—	—	—	—	—	—	—	—
1966–67	Kimberley Dynamiters	WIHL	—	—	—	—	—	—	—	—	—	—
1967–68	Kimberley Dynamiters	WIHL	41	7	27	34	72	—	—	—	—	—
1968–69	Kimberley Dynamiters	WIHL	—	—	—	—	—	—	—	—	—	—
1969–70	Kimberley Dynamiters	WIHL	23	3	7	10	14	—	—	—	—	—
1971–72	Kimberley Dynamiters	WIHL	—	—	—	—	—	—	—	—	—	—
1972–73	Milwaukee Admirals	Independent	—	—	—	—	—	—	—	—	—	—
NCAA totals			83	12	33	45	174	—	—	—	—	—

== Awards and honors ==
Award	Year
All-WIHL First Team	1956–57
AHCA Second Team All-American	1956–57
All-WIHL First Team	1957–58
AHCA West All-American	1957–58
NCAA All-Tournament First Team	1958
AHCA West All-American	1958–59
