= American Amateur Hockey League (1947–1952) =

Amateur ice hockey league

- Sport: Ice hockey
- Founded: 1947; 79 years ago
- Folded: 1952; 74 years ago
- No. of teams: 6–4
- Country: United States

The American Amateur Hockey League was an amateur ice hockey league that operated from 1947 to 1952.

== History ==
After World War II, many new ice hockey teams and leagues were formed across the United States. In Minnesota, half a dozen amateur clubs came together to form the American Amateur Hockey League, taking the same name as an earlier league that had folded in 1919. All but one of the teams was from the twin cities with the final located not too far away in Rochester, Minnesota. The league saw a few defections over the next few years, dropping down to four members in 1951. For its fifth season, the league expanded outwards, adding clubs in Eveleth, Hibbing and Sioux City, Iowa. After that, the league decided to try its hand at semi-professional hockey and rebranded as the Central Hockey League.

== Teams ==
- Eveleth Rangers (1951–52)
- Hibbing Flyers (1951–52)
- Minneapolis Bermans (1947–50)
- Minneapolis Jerseys (1947–51)
- Rochester Mustangs (1947–52)
- Sioux City Sunhawks (1951–52)
- St. Paul 7-Up (1947–50)
- St. Paul 7-Up-Koppys (1950–51)
- St. Paul Koppys (1947–50)
- St. Paul Saints (1951–52)
- St. Paul Tallys (1947–48)
- Twin City Fords (1950–51)
