= United States Central Hockey League =

- Sport: Ice hockey
- Founded: 1955; 71 years ago
- Folded: 1961; 65 years ago
- No. of teams: 5–4
- Country: United States

The United States Central Hockey League was a semi-professional ice hockey league that operated from 1955 to 1961.

== History ==
In 1955, the Minnesota Hockey League rebranded as the 'United States Central Hockey League' with all four active members joining the new league. The league was fairly stable for the first few years but by the end of the 50s, began experiencing turmoil. In 1959, three of the five member teams were based out of the twin cities. That changed when the St. Paul Capitols withdrew from the league and joined the International Hockey League. As a consequence of the move, the Minneapolis-Lincoln Culbertsons, who already had to split time between two home cities, folded. The USHL was squeezed further when, during the next season, the Denver Mavericks relocated to Minneapolis and took the name of the Minneapolis Millers.

The USHL had attempted to solve the battle for attendance by expanding into Wisconsin with two teams but both were gone after one year. Instead, the Saints and Millers partnered with USHL to operate affiliate teams in the league. The USHL's Millers became the Minneapolis Jr. Millers while the St. Paul Jr. Saints were founded in 1960. The experiment lasted just one season before both clubs were shuttered. After that Walter Bush Jr., a former president of the league, helped found the United States Hockey League out of the ashes of the USCHL.

== Teams ==
- Des Moines Ice Hawks (1958–61)
- Green Bay Bobcats (1959–60)
- Marquette Sentinals (1959–60)
- Minneapolis Bungalows (1955–58)
- Minneapolis Culbertsons (1955–58)
- Minneapolis Jr. Millers (1960–61)
- Minneapolis Millers (1958–60)
- Minneapolis-Lincoln Culbertsons (1958–59)
- Rochester Mustangs (1955–61)
- St. Paul Capitols (1958–59)
- St. Paul Jr. Saints (1960–61)
- St. Paul K.S.T.P. (1957–58)
- St. Paul Peter's Meats (1955–57)
