= 1961–62 USHL season =

- League: United States Hockey League
- Sport: Ice hockey
- Games: 26–9
- Teams: 5

Regular season
- Season champions: Rochester Mustangs

Clark Cup Playoffs
- Finals champions: Rochester Mustangs

USHL seasons
- 1962–63 →

The 1961–62 USHL season was the inaugural season of the United States Hockey League as a senior league. The Rochester Mustangs won the regular season championship and the Clark Cup as postseason champions.

== New league ==
In 1961, the United States Central Hockey League collapsed after both the Minneapolis Jr. Millers and St. Paul Jr. Saints folded. The two remaining teams, the Des Moines Oak Leafs and Rochester Mustangs banded together and formed a new semi-professional circuit called the United States Hockey League. The new league had no connection to a previous league of the same name.

The new USHL welcomed a former member of the USCHL, the Green Bay Bobcats, who had left to play as an independent club. Then, to swell the ranks, two expansion teams were added: the Milwaukee Metros and Minneapolis Rebels. However, due to the short time given for the Rebels to form, the team was unable to find a home venue and played entire on the road for the year.

== Member changes ==
Due to financial problems, the Milwaukee Metros folded on January 16, after only 9 games. In order to balance out the schedule, two wins by Rochester over the Metros were dropped from the standings.

== Regular season ==
Final standings

Note: GP = Games played; W = Wins; L = Losses; T = Ties; GF = Goals for; GA = Goals against; PTS = Points; y = clinched league title

Team	GP	W	L	T	Pts	GF	GA
y – Rochester Mustangs	25	19	6	0	38	163	106
Green Bay Bobcats	25	17	8	0	34	154	107
Des Moines Oak Leafs	26	10	16	0	20	137	158
Minneapolis Rebels	21	4	17	0	8	69	128
Milwaukee Metros	9	2	7	0	4	36	83

== Clark Cup playoffs ==
Missing information

The Rochester Mustangs won the Clark Cup
