= Reg Morelli =

Canadian ice hockey player (1935–2020)

- Born: December 10, 1935 Hamilton, Ontario, Canada
- Died: November 11, 2020 (aged 84)
- Height: 5 ft 8 in (173 cm)
- Weight: 175 lb (79 kg; 12 st 7 lb)
- Position: Center
- Played for: North Dakota Fighting Sioux; St. Paul Saints; Warroad Lakers
- Playing career: 1957–1965

Reginald P. Morelli (December 10, 1935 – November 11, 2020) was a Canadian ice hockey player who played center and was awarded the Most Outstanding Player of the 1959 NCAA Tournament.

== Career ==
Morelli was a scorer for North Dakota when he joined the varsity squad in 1957. As a sophomore, he produced more than a point-per-game pace, helping the Fighting Sioux win their first WIHL championship (tied) as well as qualify for their first NCAA tournament. After beating Harvard in the semi-final, they lost to Denver in the final, and so finished runners-up in 1958.

Although the WIHL collapsed that summer, the University of North Dakota (UND) qualified for the 1959 NCAA tournament with an 18–10–1 record, having defeated Denver during the season series. The Fighting Sioux escaped an ignominious fate with an overtime win over St. Lawrence in the semi-final, before turning their attention to Michigan State in the final.

The Spartans scored first, but a 3-goal reply from the Sioux put them firmly in charge, with Morelli assisting on the first goal. The Spartans responded in the third scoring twice to tie the game, sending the championship match into overtime for the second time in history. Just over four minutes into extra time, Morelli sent the puck past a sprawling Joe Selinger to win UND the NCAA Championship. Morelli was named the Most Outstanding Player and made the All-Tournament First Team.

As a senior, Morelli's scored 34 goals and 65 points in 31 games, setting a program record for points that stood until 1979. He was named in both the All-WCHA First Team and AHCA All-American West Team.

Morelli continued to play hockey for several years after graduating, winning the Turner Cup as a member of the St. Paul Saints in 1961. He was inducted into the UND Athletic Hall of Fame in 1977, and saw both his son Matt and grandson Mason play collegiate ice hockey. Morelli died on November 11, 2020, at the age of 84.

== Statistics ==
=== Regular season and playoffs ===
| | | | Regular season | | | | | Playoffs |
| Season | Team | League | GP | G | A | Pts | PIM | GP | G | A | Pts | PIM |
|---|---|---|---|---|---|---|---|---|---|---|---|---|
| 1957–58 | North Dakota | WIHL | 30 | 9 | 25 | 35 | 8 | — | — | — | — | — |
| 1958–59 | North Dakota | NCAA | 24 | 17 | 15 | 32 | 14 | — | — | — | — | — |
| 1959–60 | North Dakota | WCHA | 31 | 34 | 31 | 65 | 12 | — | — | — | — | — |
| 1960–61 | St. Paul Saints | IHL | 72 | 31 | 37 | 68 | 16 | 13 | 1 | 3 | 4 | 4 |
| 1963–64 | Warroad Lakers | Independent | — | — | — | — | — | — | — | — | — | — |
| 1964–65 | Warroad Lakers | Independent | — | — | — | — | — | — | — | — | — | — |
| NCAA totals | | | 85 | 60 | 72 | 132 | 34 | — | — | — | — | — |

== Awards and honors ==
| Award | Year |
|---|---|
| NCAA All-Tournament First Team | 1959 |
| All-WCHA First Team | 1959–60 |
| AHCA West All-American | 1959–60 |

Awards and achievements
| Preceded by Murray Massier | NCAA Tournament Most Outstanding Player; 1959 | Succeeded by Lou Angotti/Bob Marquis/Barry Urbanski |
