= Ching Johnson =

Canadian ice hockey player (1897–1979)

- Hockey Hall of Fame, 1958
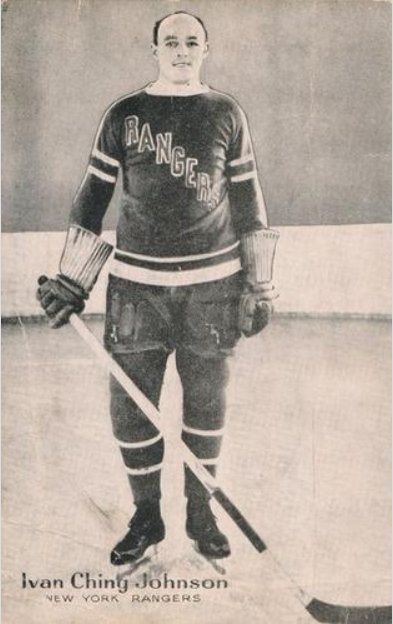
- Born: December 7, 1897 Winnipeg, Manitoba, Canada
- Died: June 17, 1979 (aged 81) Silver Spring, Maryland, U.S.
- Height: 5 ft 11 in (180 cm)
- Weight: 210 lb (95 kg; 15 st 0 lb)
- Position: Defence
- Shot: Left
- Played for: New York Rangers; New York Americans
- Playing career: 1925–1944

Ivan Wilfred "Ching" Johnson (December 7, 1897 – June 17, 1979) was a Canadian professional ice hockey player who was a defenceman for the New York Rangers and New York Americans in the National Hockey League (NHL) between 1926 and 1938. He was an original member of the Rangers and was part of two Stanley Cup championship winning teams. He was named to the NHL's post-season all-star team four times and played in the Ace Bailey Benefit Game, the first all-star game in league history.

A veteran of the First World War, Johnson did not begin playing competitive hockey until he was in his 20s and was nearly 30 when he first broke into the NHL. Regarded as one of the hardest bodycheckers to ever play the game, he was a fan favourite and went on to play 436 games with the Rangers and Americans before spending his final seasons in the minor leagues as a player, coach and official. Johnson was inducted into the Hockey Hall of Fame in 1958, and is also a member of the Manitoba Sports Hall of Fame and Museum and the Manitoba Hockey Hall of Fame.

== Early life ==
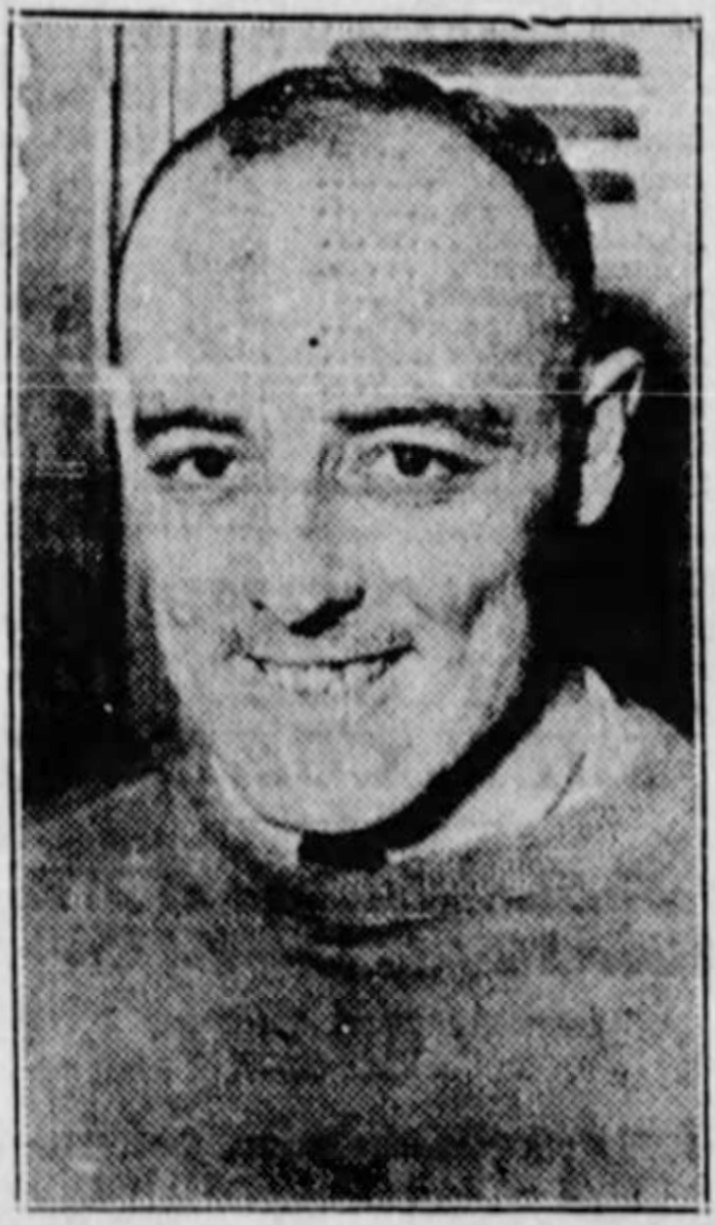
Johnson in 1926 photo

Johnson was born in Winnipeg, Manitoba, on December 7, 1897. He was an accomplished football and lacrosse player in his youth. He enlisted in the Canadian Expeditionary Force in January 1916, joining the Third Division Ammunition Column. He arrived in England on March 25, 1916, and was in France by mid-July that year, re-assigned to the Fourth Division, where he helped deliver ammunition to the front. In November 1917 he was admitted to hospital for verneral disease, and spent 84 days there, and on June 22, 1918, was awarded the Good Conduct Badge. Johnson returned to Canada in May 1919 and was discharged later that month.

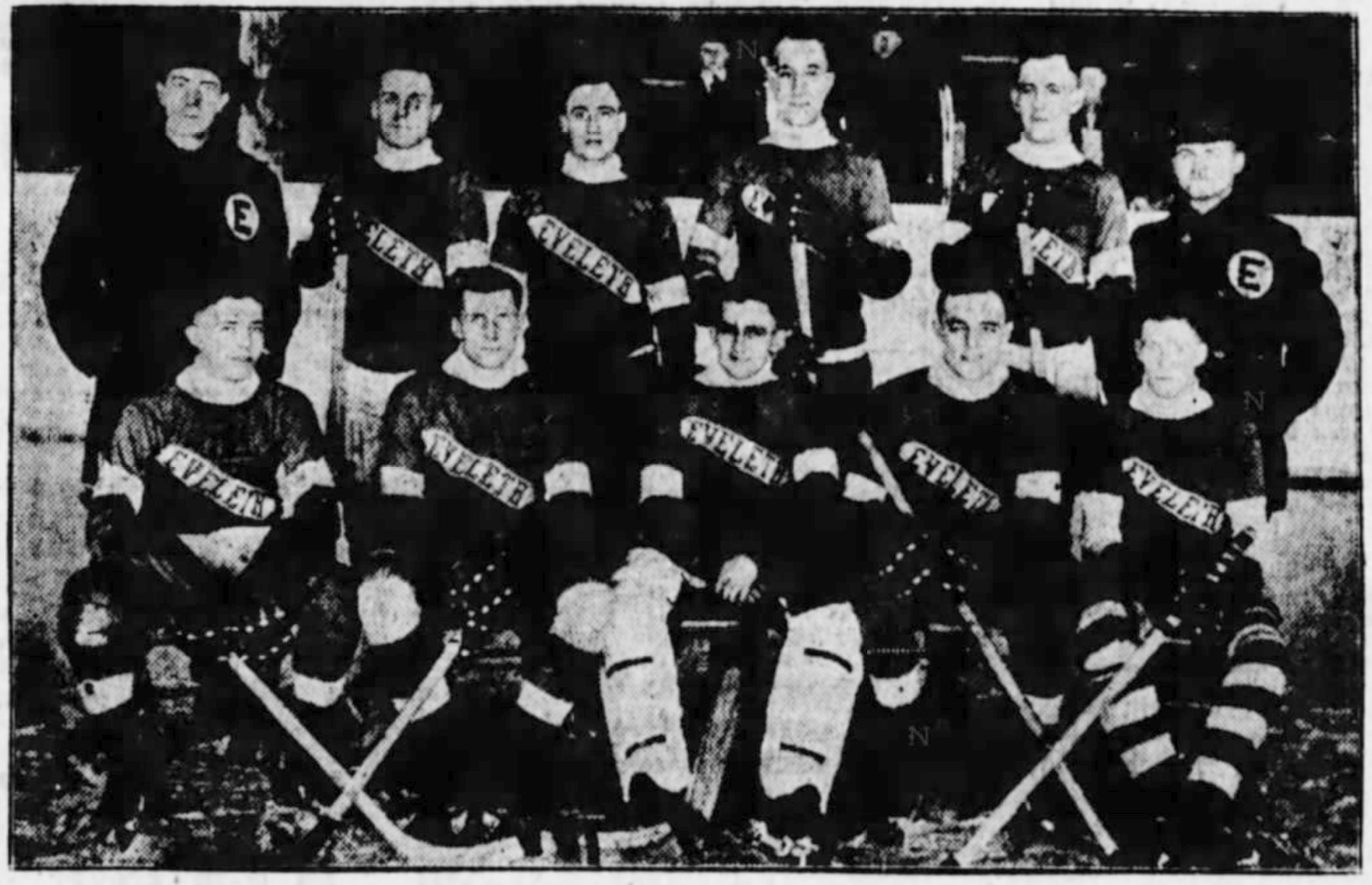
Ching Johnson, second from right in the front row, with the Eveleth Reds in 1920–21. His brother Adrian Johnson is sitting at far left.

Back in Winnipeg, Johnson worked for an electric light company. He first played competitive hockey in 1919 when he joined the Winnipeg Monarchs of the Winnipeg Senior Hockey League. He played two seasons with the Monarchs before moving to Eveleth, Minnesota, where he joined the local team to play three seasons in the United States Amateur Hockey Association (USAHA). On the Eveleth team he was a teammate of his younger brother Adrian "Ade" Johnson who played at left wing. He then played three seasons in Minneapolis, concluding in 1925–26 with the Minneapolis Millers. He was named a league all-star on defence in both 1924 and 1926. During the 1924–25 season, Johnson also served as head coach for Macalester, a small college in Saint Paul.

First nicknamed "Ivan the Terrible", Johnson later earned the nickname "Ching" when fans of the defenceman would shout "Ching, Ching Chinaman" to support him. Though he was of Irish descent, he was called "Chinaman", then "Chink" and finally "Ching" as he was considered to have an Asian looking face. His physical style of defence made him immensely popular with fans, and he was often seen with a wide grin any time he made or received contact during a game.

== National Hockey League career ==
It was from Minneapolis that Johnson was recruited, along with his defensive partner Taffy Abel, to play for the newly formed New York Rangers. Offered the position at the age of 28, Johnson insisted on a three-year contract as he believed it would be the only one he would get. He made his NHL debut in the Rangers opening game on November 16, 1926, in a 1–0 victory over the Montreal Maroons. A rugged and physical defenceman, Johnson appeared in only 27 of the Rangers' 44 games as he suffered a broken collar bone early in the season, but still finished second on the Rangers with 66 penalties in minutes. In 1927–28, his total of 146 penalty minutes led the team and was second in the NHL to Eddie Shore's 165. He added a career high 10 goals, and helped the Rangers win their first Stanley Cup. Additionally, he was voted by the fans as the most valuable player of either New York team.

Johnson was lost to the Rangers early in the 1928–29 season when he suffered a broken ankle during a December game against the Maroons. A couple days after his injury, he had to be rescued when a fire threatened the Montreal hospital at which he was convalescing. Johnson missed virtually the entire regular season with the injury, but returned in time for the 1929 playoffs, and was credited with improving the Rangers' play as they reached the final against the Boston Bruins.

His contract having expired following the season, Johnson was a hold-out when the Rangers opened their training camp prior to the 1929–30 NHL season as the team was reluctant to meet his demands for increased pay. When the impasse dragged into November, he threatened to quit the game altogether before finally agreeing to a new three-year deal. He appeared in 30 games for the Rangers that season, but again missed significant time, this time suffering a broken jaw. Again, Johnson returned in time for the playoffs, but was forced to wear a steel mask to protect his face.

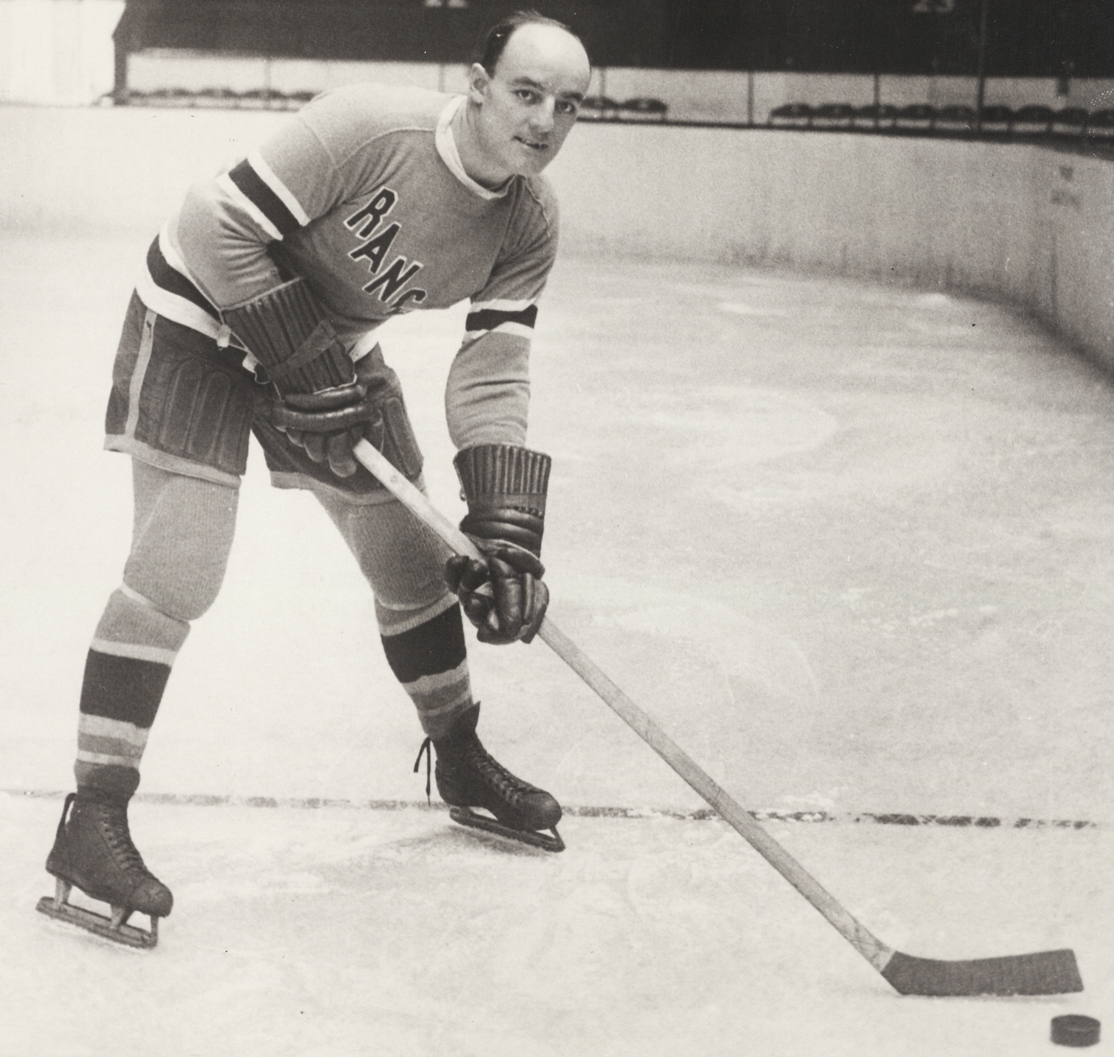
Ivan Wilfred "Ching" Johnson, c. 1932

Johnson remained healthy in 1930–31, appearing in 44 games and was named to the league's Second All-Star team on defence. In addition to being named to the first All-Star team in 1931–32, Johnson finished just one vote behind Howie Morenz for the Hart Trophy as the league's most valuable player. He was again named to the first All-Star team in 1932–33 and led the Rangers to their second Stanley Cup; his defensive play was credited as being key to the team's success.

In 1933–34, Johnson earned his fourth consecutive post-season all-star nod, on the second team. He also participated in the first all-star game in NHL history as the league held a benefit game to raise money for Toronto's Ace Bailey, whose career had been ended by a violent hit early in the season. Johnson contemplated retirement following that season as he again found himself in a dispute with the Rangers on a new contract, but signed prior to the season's start. His season was again reduced by injury in 1934–35 but he returned in time for the playoffs.

Prior to the 1936–37 season, the Rangers signed Johnson to serve as the defensive coach while he continued to play. He appeared in 35 games but scored no points. Seeing little playing time, and having an offer to coach a minor league team, Johnson requested that the Rangers give him his outright release following the season. Believing that he had become too slow to play, the team agreed. He subsequently signed with the New York Americans, with whom he played one final NHL season in 1937–38.

== Post-NHL career ==
At age 40, Johnson returned to the Minneapolis Millers as a player-coach for the 1938–39 season. He quickly became the American Hockey Association's most popular star as large crowds attended games he participated in, and was named an AHA all-star in 1939. He served in the dual role for two years before resigning in 1940. Johnson then coached for a time in California, before returning east to coach the Washington Lions of the American Hockey League. He also served as an official in the Eastern Hockey League. During one game in 1944 in which he was working as a linesman, Johnson forgot he was no longer playing and threw a bodycheck on a player. When asked after the game about the incident, he stated it was "instinct" that led him to throw the hit.

In recognition of his career, Johnson was inducted into the Hockey Hall of Fame as a player in 1958. He was also inducted into the Manitoba Sports Hall of Fame and Museum in 1994, and is an honoured member of the Manitoba Hockey Hall of Fame. The latter hall named him to province's all-century second all-star team.

After leaving hockey, Johnson worked construction in Washington, D.C., and later retired to the nearby community of Silver Spring, Maryland. He and his wife Ellen had two children: Geraldine and James. He had four grandchildren and one great-grandchild at the time of his death in 1979.

== Career statistics ==
=== Regular season and playoffs ===
			Regular season					Playoffs
Season	Team	League	GP	G	A	Pts	PIM	GP	G	A	Pts	PIM
1919–20	Winnipeg Monarchs	WSrHL	7	6	3	9	10	—	—	—	—	—
1920–21	Eveleth Reds	USAHA	—	—	—	—	—	—	—	—	—	—
1921–22	Eveleth Reds	USAHA	—	—	—	—	—	—	—	—	—	—
1922–23	Eveleth Reds	USAHA	20	4	0	4	26	—	—	—	—	—
1923–24	Minneapolis Millers	USAHA	20	9	3	12	34	—	—	—	—	—
1924–25	Minneapolis Rockets	USAHA	40	8	0	8	43	—	—	—	—	—
1925–26	Minneapolis Millers	CHL	38	14	5	19	92	3	2	0	2	6
1926–27	New York Rangers	NHL	27	3	2	5	66	2	0	0	0	8
1927–28	New York Rangers	NHL	42	10	6	16	146	9	1	1	2	46
1928–29	New York Rangers	NHL	8	0	0	0	14	6	0	0	0	26
1929–30	New York Rangers	NHL	30	3	3	6	82	4	0	0	0	14
1930–31	New York Rangers	NHL	44	2	6	8	77	4	1	0	1	17
1931–32	New York Rangers	NHL	47	3	10	13	106	7	2	0	2	24
1932–33	New York Rangers	NHL	48	8	9	17	127	8	1	0	1	14
1933–34	New York Rangers	NHL	48	2	6	8	86	2	0	0	0	4
1934–35	New York Rangers	NHL	29	2	3	5	34	4	0	0	0	2
1935–36	New York Rangers	NHL	47	5	3	8	58	—	—	—	—	—
1936–37	New York Rangers	NHL	35	0	0	0	2	9	0	1	1	4
1937–38	New York Americans	NHL	31	0	0	0	10	6	0	0	0	2
1938–39	Minneapolis Millers	AHA	47	2	9	11	60	4	0	2	2	0
1939–40	Minneapolis Millers	AHA	48	0	4	4	26	3	0	0	0	2
NHL totals			436	38	48	86	808	61	5	2	7	161
