= St. Paul Saints (disambiguation) =

The St. Paul Saints are a professional baseball team based in Saint Paul, Minnesota.

St. Paul Saints may also refer to:

== Baseball teams ==
- St. Paul Saints (UA), a baseball team that represented St. Paul, Minnesota during 1884 in the Union Association
- St. Paul Saints (1884–1900), former name of the Chicago White Sox baseball team from 1895 to 1899
- St. Paul Saints (1901–1960), a baseball team that played in the American Association from 1901 to 1960

== Ice hockey teams ==
- St. Paul Saints (AHA), amateur and professional ice hockey team from 1914–1942, originally known as the St. Paul Athletic Club
- St. Paul Saints (USHL), a professional minor league ice hockey team that played from 1945 to 1951 in the United States Hockey League
- St. Paul Saints (IHL), a professional minor league ice hockey team that played from 1959 to 1963 in the International Hockey League
- St. Paul Fighting Saints, a professional minor league ice hockey team that played the 1992–93 season in the American Hockey Association
