= Minnesota Hockey League =

- Sport: Ice hockey
- Founded: 1953; 73 years ago
- Folded: 1955; 71 years ago
- No. of teams: 4–3
- Country: United States

The Minnesota Hockey League was a semi-professional ice hockey league that operated from 1953 to 1955.

== History ==
After one season of play, the Central Hockey League collapsed when three of the five league members folded in 1953. The remaining two teams, the Hibbing Flyers and Rochester Mustangs, formed a new league, the 'Minnesota Hockey League' along with the Grand Forks Redwings. Further upheaval happened when two of the teams folded leaving only the Rochester Mustangs. Three new teams from the twin cities joined in 1954 to keep the league afloat. A year later, a group that included Walter Bush Jr. took control of the MHL and it rebranded as the United States Central Hockey League.

== Teams ==
- Grand Forks Redwings (1953–54)
- Hibbing Flyers (1953–54)
- Minneapolis Bungalows (1954–55)
- Minneapolis Culbertsons (1954–55)
- Rochester Mustangs (1953–55)
- St. Paul Saints (1954–55)
