= Gerry Jones (ice hockey) =

American ice hockey player

- Born: 1937 (age 88–89) Greenwich, Connecticut, USA
- Height: 6 ft 1 in (185 cm)
- Weight: 182 lb (83 kg; 13 st 0 lb)
- Position: Goaltender
- Played for: Yale
- Playing career: 1956–1959

Gerard Jones is an American retired ice hockey goaltender who was an All-American for Yale.

== Career ==
Jones was a 3-year starter for Murray Murdoch and played well in net for an otherwise mediocre team. As a junior Jones set a program record by stopping 66 shots in a 1–7 loss to St. Lawrence on December 14 (a record that stands as of 2020). The following year Jones was able to get Yale to post a winning record in both overall and became the first AHCA All-American in program history.

== Awards and honors ==
Award	Year
AHCA East All-American	1958–59
