= Art Strobel =

Canadian ice hockey player (1922–1991)

- Born: November 28, 1922 Regina, Saskatchewan, Canada
- Died: October 11, 1991 (aged 68)
- Height: 5 ft 6 in (168 cm)
- Weight: 160 lb (73 kg; 11 st 6 lb)
- Position: Left wing
- Shot: Left
- Played for: New York Rangers
- Playing career: 1942–1959

Arthur George Strobel (November 28, 1922 – October 11, 1991) was a Canadian-born American ice hockey player. He played seven games in the National Hockey League with the New York Rangers during the 1943–44 season. The rest of his career, which lasted from 1942 to 1959, was spent in the minor leagues. Strobel's son, Eric Strobel, also played hockey and won the gold medal with the American national team at the 1980 Winter Olympics. Strobel was born in Regina, Saskatchewan, but grew up in Rochester, New York.

Strobel coached the Rochester Mustangs until 1958, when Ken Johannson succeeded him.

== Career statistics ==
=== Regular season and playoffs ===
			Regular season					Playoffs
Season A	Team	League	GP	G	A	Pts	PIM	GP	G	A	Pts	PIM
1941–42	Regina Abbotts	S-SJHL	7	0	0	0	0	—	—	—	—	—
1942–43	Yorkton Wings	SSHL	1	0	0	0	0	—	—	—	—	—
1942–43	Regina Commandos	S-SJHL	13	4	5	9	2	6	2	3	5	4
1942–43	Regina Pats	M-Cup	—	—	—	—	—	2	0	0	0	0
1943–44	New York Rangers	NHL	7	0	0	0	0	—	—	—	—	—
1943–44	New York Rovers	EAHL	30	12	18	30	2	9	6	7	13	10
1944–45	Hershey Bears	AHL	56	11	15	26	8	11	5	0	5	4
1945–46	Hershey Bears	AHL	4	0	3	3	0	—	—	—	—	—
1945–46	Minneapolis Millers	USHL	43	6	8	14	6	—	—	—	—	—
1946–47	Minneapolis Millers	USHL	59	17	17	34	27	3	0	0	0	4
1947–48	Minneapolis Millers	USHL	59	19	23	42	15	10	0	2	2	2
1948–49	Minneapolis Millers	USHL	61	14	29	43	13	—	—	—	—	—
1949–50	Portland Buckaroos	PCHL	71	20	23	43	28	—	—	—	—	—
1952–53	Rochester Mustangs	CHL	32	32	30	62	6	—	—	—	—	—
1957–58	Rochester Mustangs	CHL	30	16	18	34	—	—	—	—	—	—
1958–59	Rochester Mustangs	CHL	30	22	17	39	—	—	—	—	—	—
USHL totals			222	56	77	133	61	13	0	2	2	6
NHL totals			7	0	0	0	0	—	—	—	—	—
