= Eddie Rodden =

Canadian ice hockey player

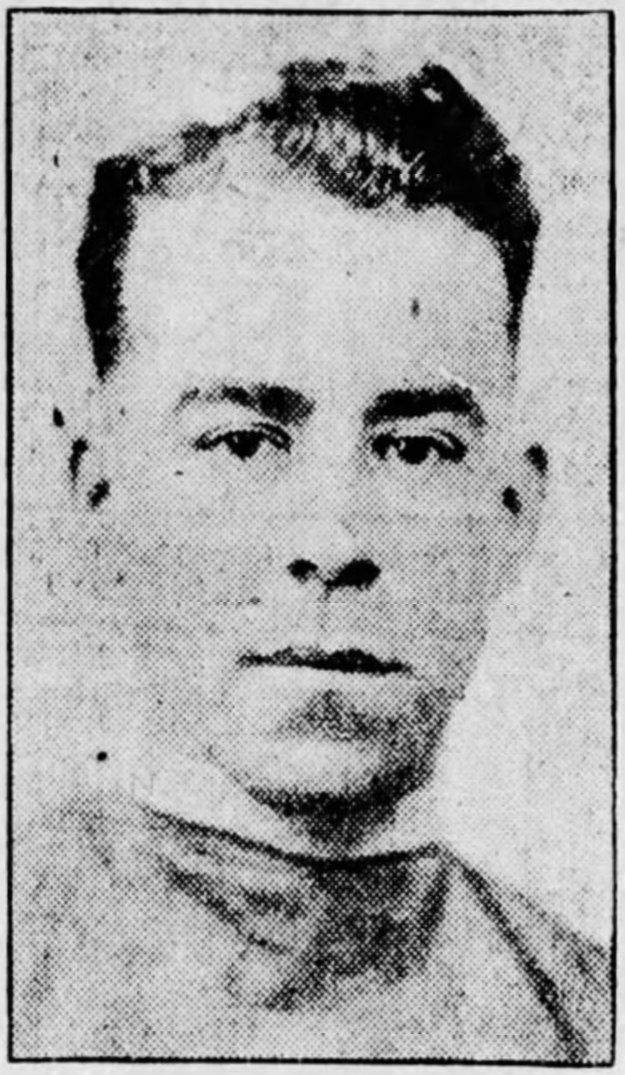
- Born: March 22, 1901 Mattawa, Ontario, Canada
- Died: September 10, 1986 (aged 85)
- Height: 6 ft 0 in (183 cm)
- Weight: 180 lb (82 kg; 12 st 12 lb)
- Position: Centre
- Shot: Right
- Played for: Chicago Black Hawks; Toronto Maple Leafs; Boston Bruins; New York Rangers
- Playing career: 1925–1934

Edmund Anthony Rodden (March 22, 1901 in Mattawa, Ontario — September 10, 1986) was a Canadian professional ice hockey player who played 97 games in the National Hockey League with the Chicago Black Hawks, Toronto Maple Leafs, Boston Bruins, and New York Rangers between 1926 and 1931. He won the Stanley Cup in 1929 with the Bruins.

He was a younger brother of National Hockey League referee and Canadian football coach Mike Rodden.

== Career statistics ==
=== Regular season and playoffs ===
			Regular season					Playoffs
Season	Team	League	GP	G	A	Pts	PIM	GP	G	A	Pts	PIM
1914–15	Haileybury Rexalls	NOHA	—	—	—	—	—	—	—	—	—	—
1917–18	New Liskeard Pioneers	NOHA	—	—	—	—	—	—	—	—	—	—
1918–19	Toronto Parkdale Canoe Club	OHA	—	—	—	—	—	—	—	—	—	—
1919–20	Toronto De La Salle	OHA	—	—	—	—	—	—	—	—	—	—
1921–22	Toronto Aura Lee	OHA Sr	10	9	6	15	—	2	0	1	1	—
1922–23	Toronto Granites	OHA Sr	7	3	1	4	—	—	—	—	—	—
1922–23	Toronto Granites	Al-Cup	—	—	—	—	—	4	4	1	5	4
1923–24	Eveleth Reds	USAHA	21	9	0	9	—	—	—	—	—	—
1924–25	Eveleth Reds	USAHA	39	1	0	1	—	3	0	0	0	—
1925–26	Eveleth-Hibbing Rangers	CHL	36	7	9	16	42	—	—	—	—	—
1926–27	Minneapolis Millers	AHA	19	6	3	9	8	—	—	—	—	—
1926–27	Chicago Black Hawks	NHL	19	3	3	6	0	2	0	1	1	0
1927–28	Chicago Black Hawks	NHL	8	0	1	1	6	—	—	—	—	—
1927–28	Toronto Maple Leafs	NHL	33	3	7	10	36	—	—	—	—	—
1928–29	Boston Bruins	NHL	11	0	0	0	10	1	0	0	0	0
1928–29	Windsor Hornets	Can-Pro	19	6	5	11	14	3	1	0	1	20
1929–30	London Panthers	IHL	42	13	30	43	50	2	1	0	1	2
1930–31	New York Rangers	NHL	19	0	3	3	8	—	—	—	—	—
1930–31	Pittsburgh Yellow Jackets	IHL	29	7	7	14	21	6	0	1	1	6
1931–32	Pittsburgh Yellow Jackets	IHL	42	5	13	18	43	—	—	—	—	—
1932–33	Quebec Castors	Can-Am	11	3	3	6	12	—	—	—	—	—
1932–33	Windsor Bulldogs	IHL	21	2	4	6	10	6	0	0	0	2
1933–34	Tulsa Oilers	AHA	13	2	6	8	10	4	1	1	2	0
IHL totals			134	27	54	81	124	14	1	1	2	10
NHL totals			90	6	14	20	60	3	0	1	1	0
