= Joe Selinger =

Canadian ice hockey player

- Born: Regina, Saskatchewan, Canada
- Height: 5 ft 10 in (178 cm)
- Weight: 175 lb (79 kg; 12 st 7 lb)
- Position: Goaltender
- Played for: Michigan State; Denver Mavericks/Minneapolis Millers
- Playing career: 1956–1960

Joe Selinger is a Canadian retired ice hockey goaltender who was an All-American for Michigan State and led the team it its first NCAA tournament appearance in 1959.

== Career ==
Selinger was the starting goalie for the Regina Pats when the team won the Abbott Cup in 1955. The following fall he began attending Michigan State University and would help turn around a moribund program. To that point, MSU had finished in either last or second-last in the WIHL and had never finished with a record of even .400. While he was on the freshman team, the Spartans continued that trend and won one of eighteen conference games. When Selinger made the varsity team the following season the team still finished in last place, but quintupled their WIHL victory totals while lowering the team's goals against by 25.

Both the team and Selinger improved during his second year and the team finished 5th in their conference while producing the first winning season in program history (12–11). Selinger was named team MVP and possessed some of the best numbers in college hockey. In his final season with Michigan State the program turned a corner; due to a dispute between Denver and Minnesota the WIHL was dissolved and the three extant programs that were members of the Big Ten formed the ice hockey division of the conference. Selinger was the star of the team once more, leading the Spartans to their first conference championship of any kind and a 16–5–1 record in the regular season. He was again named team MVP and earned national recognition by being named as an AHCA All-American, the first in program history. The stellar season resulted in MSU receiving their first national tournament appearance as well as the top western seed.

The team faced Michigan State in the semifinal and, while no goaltending stats from the game survive, Selinger was instrumental in holding the Eagles back and earning the Spartans a 4–3 victory. In the championship game North Dakota stood in their way but the Spartans took an early lead. The Sioux broke out in the second, scoring 3 times on 17 shots and completely dominated the middle period. Michigan State responded well in the third, however, and netted two goals to tie the game and send the match into overtime. The MSU defense did well at the start, holding North Dakota without a shot for the first four minutes, but when the Fighting Sioux finally managed to fire a puck on goal it sailed in past a sprawled-out Selinger. While the ending was bittersweet, Selinger's final season was a rousing success for the Spartans. He set numerous program records, including shutouts, goals against average (career and single-season) and, while all have since been surpassed, he became the first in a long line of Spartan goaltenders who were All-Americans.

Selinger played professionally after graduating, appearing in 66 games for the Denver Mavericks/Minneapolis Millers in 1959–60 but no record of him playing organized hockey after 1960 exists.

== Statistics ==
=== Regular season and playoffs ===
			Regular season									Playoffs
Season	Team	League	GP	W	L	T	MIN	GA	SO	GAA	SV%	GP	W	L	MIN	GA	SO	GAA	SV%
1953–54	Regina Pats	WCJHL	—	—	—	—	—	—	—	—	—	—	—	—	—	—	—	—	—
1954–55	Regina Pats	WCJHL	39	—	—	—	—	—	—	—	—	—	—	—	—	—	—	—	—
1956–57	Michigan State	WIHL	—	—	—	—	—	—	1	3.40	—	—	—	—	—	—	—	—	—
1957–58	Michigan State	WIHL	20	—	—	—	—	—	1	3.27	—	—	—	—	—	—	—	—	—
1958–59	Michigan State	Big Ten	24	—	—	—	—	—	4	2.67	—	—	—	—	—	—	—	—	—
1959–60	Denver Mavericks/Minneapolis Millers	IHL	66	—	—	—	—	219	4	3.33	—	—	—	—	—	—	—	—	—
NCAA totals			—	—	—	—	—	—	6	3.09	—	—	—	—	—	—	—	—	—

== Awards and honors ==
Award	Year
All-WIHL Second Team	1957–58
AHCA West All-American	1958–59
NCAA All-Tournament First Team	1959
