= Percy Galbraith =

Canadian ice hockey player

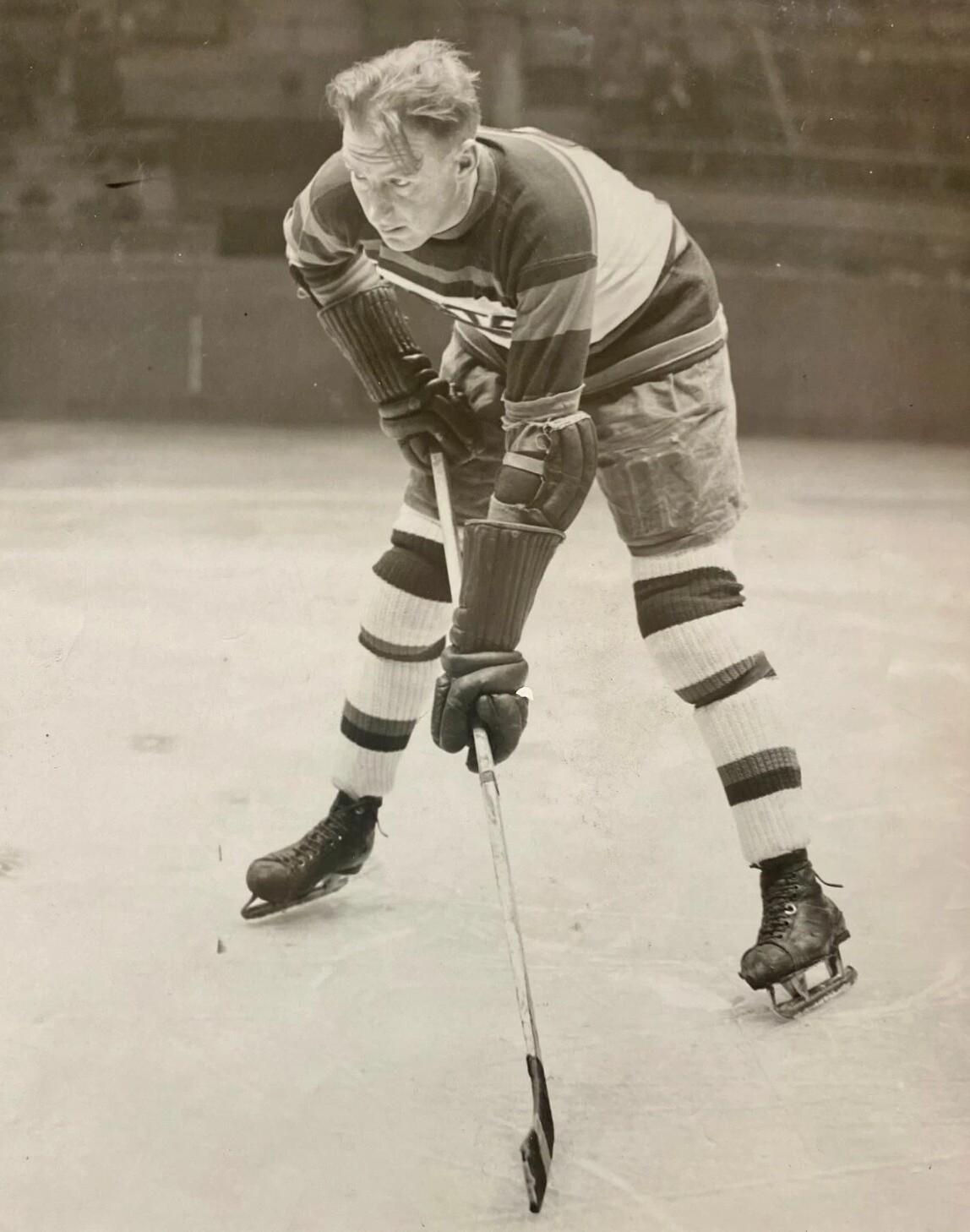
- Galbraith, c. 1929
- Born: December 5, 1898 Toronto, Ontario, Canada
- Died: June 19, 1961 (aged 62) Minneapolis, Minnesota, U.S.
- Height: 5 ft 10 in (178 cm)
- Weight: 162 lb (73 kg; 11 st 8 lb)
- Position: Left wing
- Shot: Left
- Played for: Boston Bruins; Ottawa Senators
- Playing career: 1914–1939

Percival Walter "Perk" Galbraith (December 5, 1898 – June 19, 1961) was a Canadian ice hockey forward. He was born in Toronto, Ontario. He played in the National Hockey League with the Boston Bruins and Ottawa Senators between 1926 and 1934.

Galbraith started his National Hockey League career with the Boston Bruins in 1926. He would also play for the Ottawa Senators. He would retire from the NHL after the 1934 season. He won the Stanley Cup with the Boston Bruins in 1929. He is buried in Fort Snelling National Cemetery in Minneapolis.

== Career statistics ==
=== Regular season and playoffs ===
			Regular season					Playoffs
Season	Team	League	GP	G	A	Pts	PIM	GP	G	A	Pts	PIM
1914–15	Winnipegs	MHL	8	2	2	4	6	—	—	—	—	—
1915–16	Winnipeg Victorias	MHL	2	3	1	4	2	—	—	—	—	—
1916–17	Winnipeg Victorias	WSrHL	—	—	—	—	—	—	—	—	—	—
1919–20	Winnipeg Monarchs	WSrHL	7	6	1	7	6	—	—	—	—	—
1920–21	Eveleth Reds	USAHA	—	—	—	—	—	—	—	—	—	—
1921–22	Eveleth Reds	USAHA	—	—	—	—	—	—	—	—	—	—
1922–23	Eveleth Reds	USAHA	20	4	0	4	—	—	—	—	—	—
1923–24	Eveleth Reds	USAHA	21	9	2	11	—	—	—	—	—	—
1924–25	Eveleth Arrowheads	USAHA	38	10	0	10	—	4	0	0	0	0
1925–26	Eveleth-Hibbing Rangers	CHL	37	6	5	11	40	—	—	—	—	—
1926–27	Boston Bruins	NHL	42	9	8	17	26	8	3	3	6	2
1927–28	Boston Bruins	NHL	42	6	5	11	26	2	0	1	1	6
1928–29	Boston Bruins	NHL	38	2	1	3	44	5	0	0	0	2
1929–30	Boston Bruins	NHL	44	7	9	16	38	6	1	3	4	8
1930–31	Boston Bruins	NHL	43	2	3	5	28	5	0	0	0	6
1931–32	Boston Bruins	NHL	47	2	1	3	28	—	—	—	—	—
1932–33	Boston Bruins	NHL	47	1	2	3	28	5	0	0	0	0
1933–34	Ottawa Senators	NHL	2	0	0	0	)	—	—	—	—	—
1933–34	Boston Bruins	NHL	42	0	2	2	6	—	—	—	—	—
1961–62	Eveleth Rangers	CHL	45	4	5	9	6	—	—	—	—	—
1935–36	Wichita Skyhawks	AHA	47	4	5	9	34	—	—	—	—	—
1936–37	Wichita Skyhawks	AHA	48	4	4	8	38	—	—	—	—	—
1937–38	St. Paul Saints	AHA	34	3	0	3	10	—	—	—	—	—
1938–39	St. Paul Saints	AHA	3	0	0	0	0	—	—	—	—	—
1939–40	St. Paul Saints	AHA	—	—	—	—	—	—	—	—	—	—
NHL totals			347	29	31	60	224	31	4	7	11	24
