= Ken Johannson =

American ice hockey player and executive (1930–2018)

- Born: October 6, 1930; Edmonton, Alberta, Canada
- Died: November 27, 2018 (aged 88); Naples, Florida, US
- Education: University of North Dakota
- Occupation: Mayo Clinic administrator
- Known for: Amateur Hockey Association of the United States executive
- Children: 3, including John and Jim
Ice hockey career
- Height: 5 ft 11 in (180 cm)
- Weight: 200 lb (91 kg; 14 st 4 lb)
- Position: Center
- Shot: Right
- Played for: North Dakota Fighting Sioux; Streatham Royals; Wembley Lions; Rochester Mustangs
- National team: United States
- Playing career: 1950–1968

Kenneth Johannson (October 6, 1930 – November 27, 2018) was a Canadian-born American ice hockey player, coach and executive. A native of Edmonton, he attended the University of North Dakota on a football scholarship, then played for the Fighting Sioux men's ice hockey team and was its captain for two seasons. After a professional career in England, Scotland and Switzerland, he played for the Rochester Mustangs in the United States Central Hockey League from 1957 to 1968. He served as player-coach of the Mustangs for two seasons and led them to the league's championship in 1959. In the 1961–62 season, Johannson played with Herb Brooks and Bill Reichart on the highest-scoring forward line in league history at the time, and led the league in individual point scoring in three seasons. He played for the United States men's national ice hockey team at two Ice Hockey World Championships, winning a bronze medal in 1962. He was inducted into the University of North Dakota Athletics Hall of Fame in 1977.

Johannson helped establish hockey at Rochester Lourdes High School and Rochester Junior College, before starting a minor ice hockey program in Rochester, Minnesota. During the 1970s, he served as the first national coaching director for the Amateur Hockey Association of the United States, developed its first coaching manuals and oversaw schools for hockey players and coaches. He served as general manager of the United States national team at the 1979 World Championships and preparations for ice hockey at the 1980 Winter Olympics. He arranged an exhibition schedule for the national team at the Metropolitan Sports Center prior to the Olympics, which included games versus the Minnesota North Stars, university teams, the Canada and Soviet Union national teams, and the Central Hockey League. He resigned as general manager before the Olympics citing personal reasons, and had completed all of the necessary travel arrangements and accommodations for the national team which subsequently won the gold medal as part of the Miracle on Ice. He was the father of professional hockey players John Johannson and Jim Johannson, the latter of whom also served as general manager of the United States national team.

== Early life and university ==
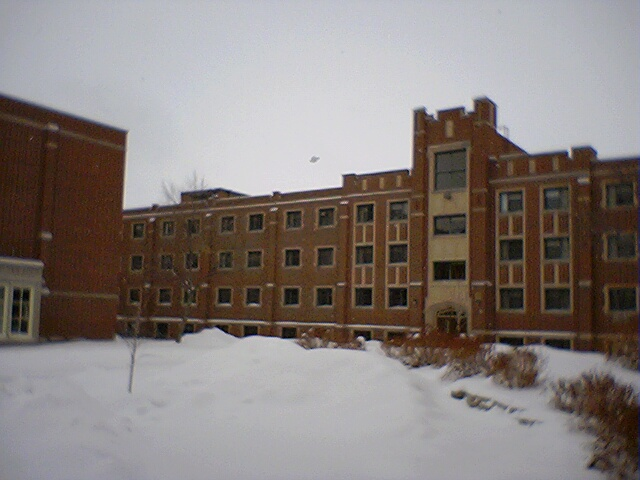
University of North Dakota in winter

Kenneth Johannson was born on October 6, 1930, in Edmonton, Alberta. He was described by the Edmonton Journal as a "crack athlete" from the south side of Edmonton, where he played ice hockey, rugby football, and fastpitch softball. He played senior men's softball with the Jenner Motors team in 1951 and 1952, and coached an intermediate level women's softball team in 1955 in Edmonton.

Johannson's football coach in Edmonton was a former University of North Dakota athlete and convinced him to attend the school, where he played in the offensive backfield and as a punter for the North Dakota Fighting Sioux football team. He completed three seasons on a football scholarship in addition to three seasons with the North Dakota Fighting Sioux men's ice hockey team. He paid additional school expenses by working at doctor's clinic, and convinced three friends from Edmonton to join the school's hockey team.

In hockey, Johannson played as a center, and was listed as 5 ft 11 in (180 cm) and 200 lb (91 kg). He was the Fighting Sioux's leading scorer in the 1950–51 season with 59 points in 26 games, and placed eight overall in the National Collegiate Athletic Association (NCAA) top scorers. Coach Cliff Purpur named Johannson a team captain in 1951, a position he held for the next two seasons. In a span of 24 games during the 1951–52 season, he set a team record for the most consecutive games scoring at least one point.

== Professional hockey career ==
Johannson's early professional hockey career saw him play for teams based in England, Scotland and Switzerland. He was a member of the Streatham Royals in the English National League for the 1953–54 season, the Kirkcaldy Flyers in the Scottish Ice Hockey Association for the 1954–55 season, and the Wembley Lions in the British National League for the 1955–56 season. He was also a player-coach for two seasons in Switzerland.

In 1956, Johannson began coaching high school boys ice hockey in Minnesota. He and Bob Johnson were hired by Warroad High School as teachers and coaches of the boys' hockey team. They had previously been roommates for two years at North Dakota, and neither knew the other was hired to run the team. During the 1956–57 season, Johannson played senior ice hockey with the Warroad Lakers. In February 1957, Johannson resigned his position in Warroad, then completed the season playing hockey in Zürich. He was considered for the head coach position of the Fighting Sioux men's hockey team for the 1957–58 season, that was instead given to Bob May.

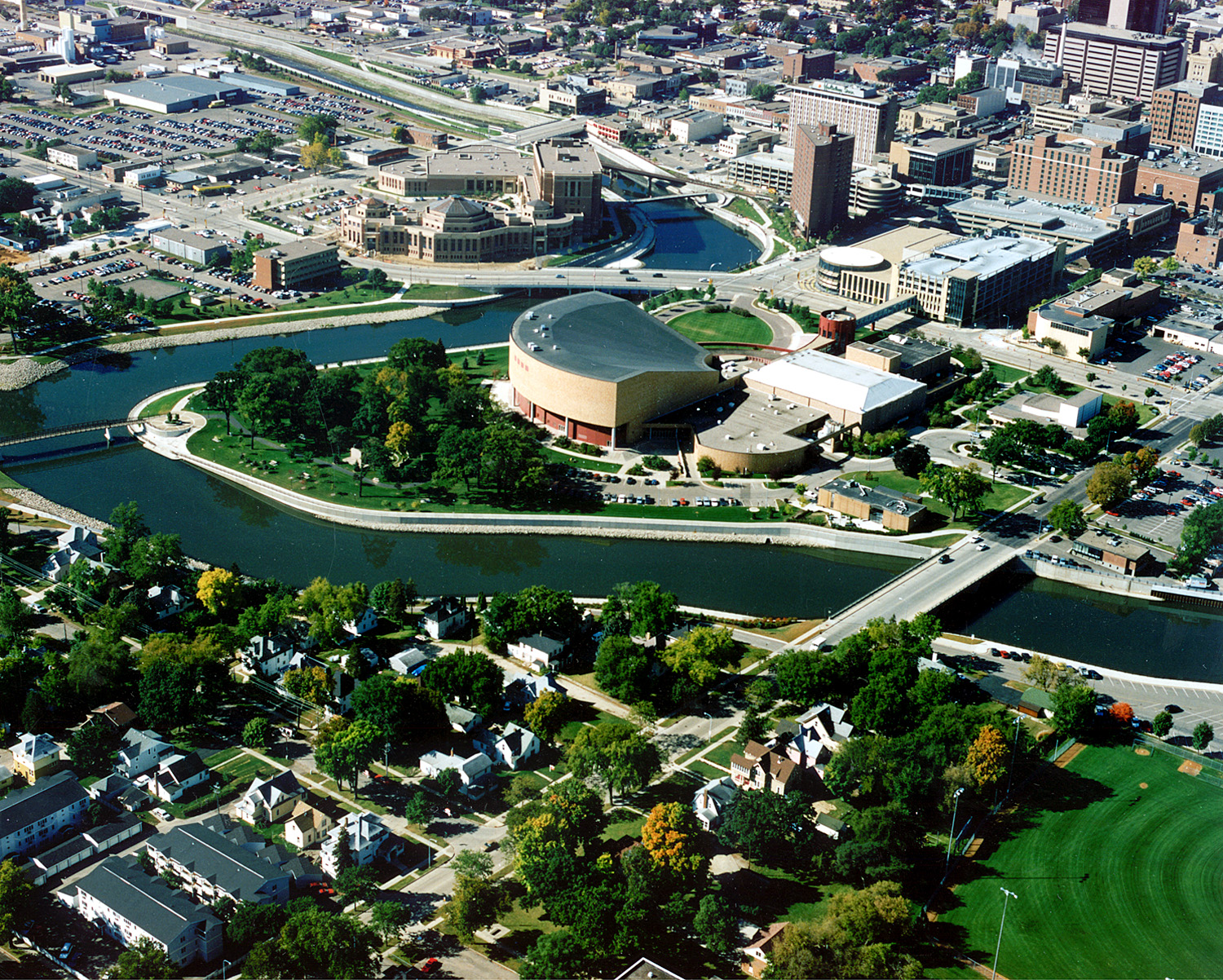
Aerial view of the Mayo Civic Auditorium and downtown Rochester, Minnesota

Johannson played for the Rochester Mustangs in the United States Central Hockey League from 1957 to 1968. The Mustangs played home games at the Mayo Civic Auditorium which was 145 ft (44 m) long. The team's style of play was more physical compared to faster-skating teams which played their home games in a standard 200 ft (61 m) rink. Art Strobel quit coaching the Mustangs in 1958, and Johannson was named the team's player-coach for the 1958–59 and 1959–60 seasons. He was named to the league's all-star team in January 1958, in an exhibition game versus the United States national team, and coached the Mustangs to the league's championship for the 1958–59 season. He led the league with 42 goals and 78 points scored during the 1959–60 season, and was named player-coach of the Midwestern United States all-star team that played an exhibition game versus the Soviet Union national team in January 1960.

In 1960, Johannson relinquished coaching duties and continued as a player for the Mustangs. In the 1961–62 season, Johannson, Herb Brooks and Bill Reichart formed the highest-scoring forward line in league history at the time. John Mayasich coached the rival Green Bay Bobcats, and felt that the Mustangs had the strongest pair of forward lines in league history.

In advance of the 1962 Ice Hockey World Championships, Johannson was one of 13 Minnesotans and one of five Canadian-born players named to the United States national team. Before the game versus the Canada national team he stated, "We're really up for this championship. A lot of the fellows have never played in this type of international competition and are determined to make good. We know a lot of our friends are going to be watching the game with Canada and we want to go into that game with a chance to win. If we do–and I feel confident we will–the Canadians had better be ready for the game of their lives". United States national team coach Connie Pieban wanted his fastest skaters versus Canada, and chose not to play Johannson in the game. Johannson scored four goals and three assists in five games at the World Championships, as the United States won the bronze medal.

Johannson contemplated retirement before the 1963–64 season, then played all 30 games for the Mustangs and led the league with 49 points scored. He led the league in scoring again during the 1964–65 season, with 50 points.

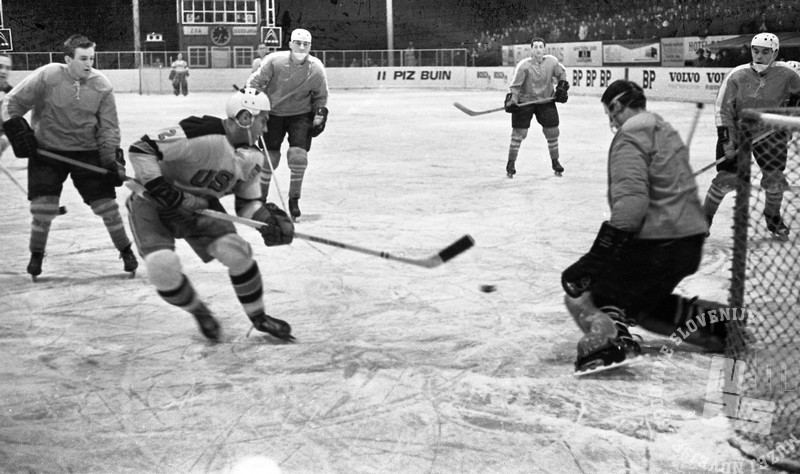
United States vs. Yugoslavia at the 1966 World Championships

In January 1966, Johannson came out of retirement, then scored 11 goals and 14 assists in his first 11 games for the Mustangs. He completed the 1965–66 season with 16 goals and 19 assists in 17 games, and was named to the United States national team for the 1966 Ice Hockey World Championships in Yugoslavia. His only goal of the event came in a 6–4 victory versus the Poland national team, which helped the United States complete the World Championships with two wins, five losses and a seventh-place finish to avoid demotion to a lower division.

Johannson retired again in November 1966, then returned for his final season and played in the league's 1967–68 all-star game.

During his time in Rochester, Minnesota, Johannson was instrumental in establishing local youth and high school hockey programs. He and Gene Campbell were the inaugural coaches for the Rochester Lourdes High School program, before Johannson helped establish a hockey program at Rochester Junior College and the minor ice hockey program in Rochester. He and Arley Carlson began youth hockey schools in Rochester and used their own money to pay for the ice time and uniforms for the players.

== National hockey executive ==
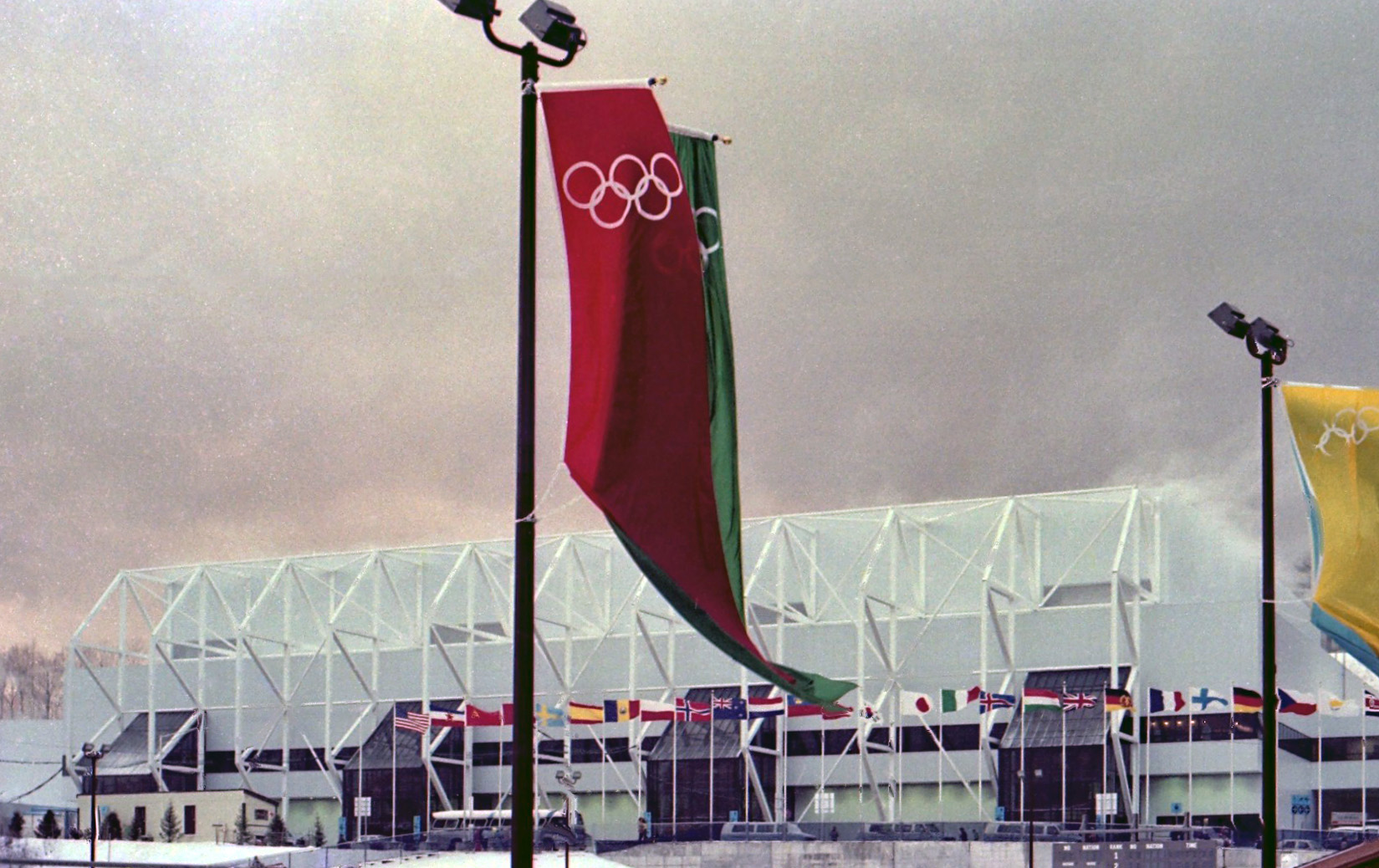
Hockey arena at the 1980 Winter Olympics in Lake Placid

During the 1970s, Johannson served as the first national coaching director for the Amateur Hockey Association of the United States (AHAUS), and developed its first coaching manuals. He also oversaw and assisted operating schools for minor hockey players and coaches across the country. He served as general manager of the United States national team for the 1979 Ice Hockey World Championships, where the United States won two and tied four of its nine games to remain in the top tier for the upcoming Olympic Games.

Johannson remained general manager of the United States national team for ice hockey at the 1980 Winter Olympics, with his former teammate Herb Brooks as the coach. The United States Olympic Committee arranged tryouts for the team as part of the National Sports Festival in Colorado Springs, and invited 68 players divided into four regional hockey teams led by college coaches. Brooks selected 26 players in consultation with Johannson. The 1980 national team had the youngest average age in its history, and included seventeen Minnesotans and eight players from the Minnesota Golden Gophers team that Brooks coached to the 1979 NCAA championship. The Star Tribune credited Brooks for implementing a selection plan that gathered input from as many sources as possible. When Johannson was questioned whether it was the fairest and most open process that had been used to select a national team, he disagreed and felt that AHAUS had used ideas learned from its previous experience and that the process had not been any more open than in the past.

When the Minnesota North Stars then invited the United States national team to share the Metropolitan Sports Center as a home rink in preparation for the Olympics, Johannson scheduled an exhibition game which he stated would be the first such event between a National Hockey League team and any national team. He planned games versus the Minnesota Golden Gophers, the Wisconsin Badgers, the Canada and Soviet Union national teams; and home-and-home series with each Central Hockey League team as part of the league's 1979–80 season. He also announced a partnership with the Minnesota Amateur Hockey Association to sell tickets to the home games, and planned for the national team to travel to West Germany and Czechoslovakia for exhibition games.

Johannson resigned as general manager of the United States national team as of November 1, 1979, citing personal reasons. Journalist Frank Brown felt that media had incorrectly speculated that Johannson resigned due to a rift with Brooks, but rather that the volunteer work for the national team had taken a toll on Johannson's personal life and could not devote enough time to the team. Johannson had completed all of the necessary travel arrangements and accommodations for the national team at the time of his resignation, then was succeeded by Ralph Jasinksi. The United States national team subsequently won the Olympic hockey gold medal as part of the Miracle on Ice.

== Personal life ==
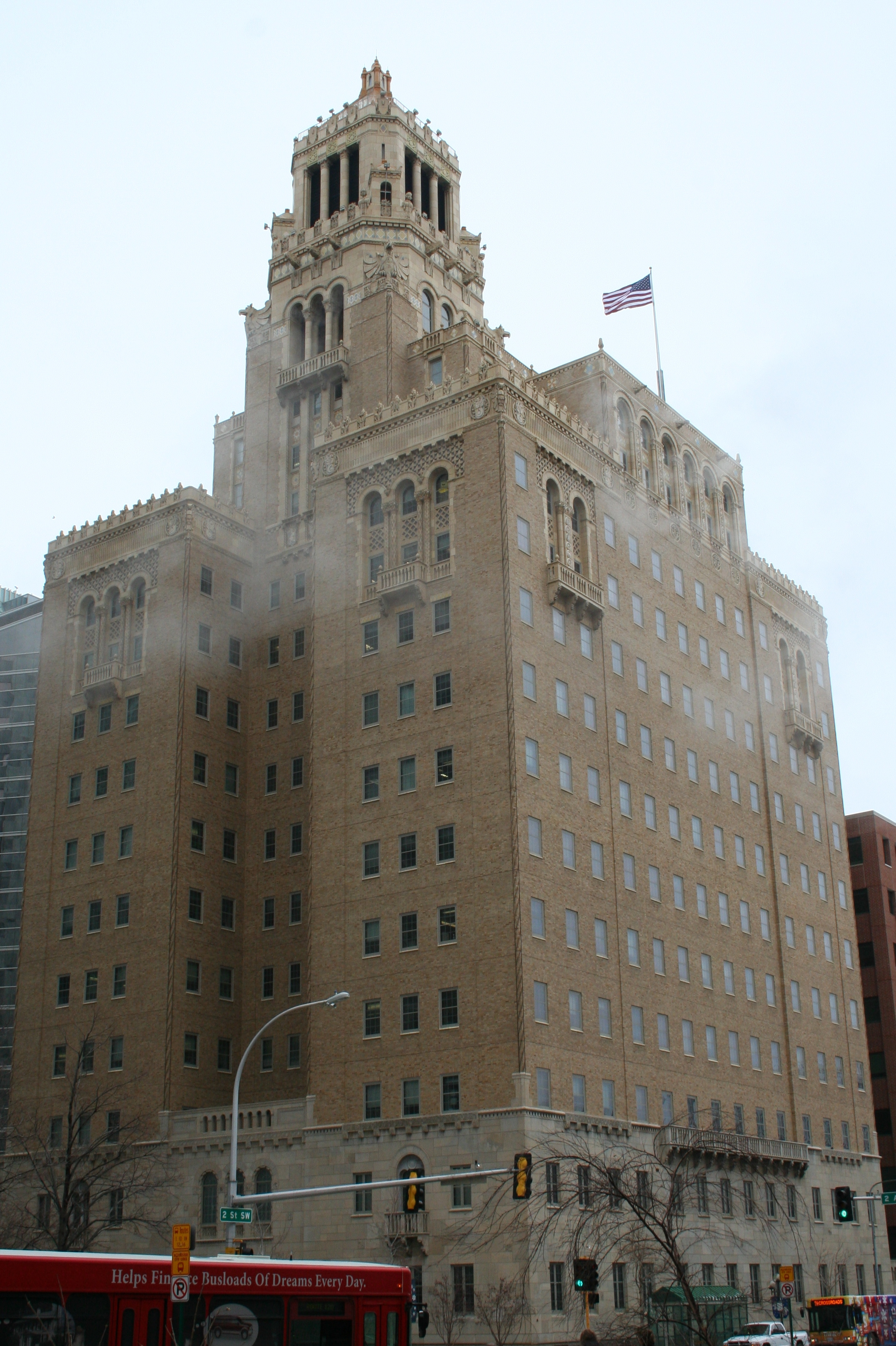
The Plummer Building at the Mayo Clinic in Rochester

In 1957, Johannson moved from Warroad to Milwaukee, then worked as a Procter & Gamble sales agent for Crest toothpaste. He met his wife Marietta Sands on a blind date, married in 1958, and had one daughter and two sons, including John Johannson (born 1961) and Jim Johannson (born 1964). Johannson moved to Rochester in 1959, and began a 34-year career as an administrator at the Mayo Clinic. He became a naturalized citizen of the United States in 1961.

Johannson played tennis after retiring from hockey. At the Rochester Open Tennis Tournament, he and his partner won the junior vets doubles competition in 1970, and placed second in 1974.

While Johannson worked for the AHAUS, his sons accompanied him to summer camps where they demonstrated hockey skills he taught, and were included in photos for coaching manuals. His sons also went with him to the tryouts for the US men's national team, and assisted by handing out shoes and jackets to the players and being stick boys. When he resigned as general manager of the US men's national team, he had coronary artery bypass surgery shortly after the 1980 Winter Olympics.

Johannson's sons were recruited to the Wisconsin Badgers by his former Warroad teammate Bob Johnson, and they played together on the 1983 NCAA championship team. John later played for the New Jersey Devils, and Jim followed in his father's footsteps as the general manager of the United States national team.

Johannson began wintering in Naples, Florida as of 1992, and died there at age 88 on November 27, 2018.

== Honors and legacy ==
Johannson was inducted into the University of North Dakota Athletics Hall of Fame in 1977. He received the USA Hockey Builders Award in 2011, in recognition of "lasting contributions to the long-term growth and success of USA Hockey". He was inducted into the Rochester Sports Hall of Fame, and is a partial namesake of annual scholarships given to high school hockey players by the Rochester Hockey Foundation.

== Playing statistics ==
=== Regular season and playoffs ===
Career playing statistics:

			Regular season					Playoffs
Season	Team	League	GP	G	A	Pts	PIM	GP	G	A	Pts	PIM
1950–51	North Dakota Fighting Sioux	Independent	26	27	32	59	0	–	–	–	–	–
1951–52	North Dakota Fighting Sioux	MCHL	–	–	–	–	–	–	–	–	–	–
1952–53	North Dakota Fighting Sioux	MCHL	–	–	–	–	–	–	–	–	–	–
1953–54	Streatham Royals	ENL	60	20	42	62	48	–	–	–	–	–
1954–55	Kirkcaldy Flyers	SIHA	26	14	7	21	18	–	–	–	–	–
1955–56	Wembley Lions	BNL	22	6	11	17	6	–	–	–	–	–
1956–57	Warroad Lakers	Northwest	–	–	–	–	–	–	–	–	–	–
1957–58	Rochester Mustangs	USCHL	–	23	22	45	0	–	–	–	–	–
1959–60	Rochester Mustangs	USCHL	24	42	36	78	12	–	–	–	–	–
1960–61	Rochester Mustangs	USCHL	–	–	–	–	–	–	–	–	–	–
1961–62	Rochester Mustangs	USHL	–	–	–	–	–	–	–	–	–	–
1962–63	Rochester Mustangs	USHL	–	29	47	76	20	–	–	–	–	–
1963–64	Rochester Mustangs	USHL	30	25	24	49	23	–	–	–	–	–
1964–65	Rochester Mustangs	USHL	–	25	25	50	0	–	–	–	–	–
1965–66	Rochester Mustangs	USHL	17	16	19	35	0	–	–	–	–	–
1967–68	Rochester Mustangs	USHL	–	11	17	28	6	–	–	–	–	–
USHL totals			incomplete					–	–	–	–	–

=== International ===
International tournament statistics:

Year	Team	Event	GP	G	A	Pts	PIM
1962	United States	IHWC	5	4	3	7	0
1966	United States	IHWC	7	1	0	1	4
World Championships totals			12	5	3	8	4
