= Joe Jangro =

American ice hockey player

- Born: October 20, 1937 Stoneham, Massachusetts, USA
- Died: May 26, 2017 (aged 79) Windham, New Hampshire, USA
- Height: 5 ft 7 in (170 cm)
- Weight: 165 lb (75 kg; 11 st 11 lb)
- Position: Defenseman
- Shot: Right
- Played for: Boston College
- Playing career: 1956–1971

Joseph Philip Jangro (October 20, 1937 – May 26, 2017) was an American ice hockey defenseman who was an All-American for Boston College.

== Career ==
Jangro was a three-sport star player for Melrose High School, graduating in 1955. He began attending Boston College that fall and joined the varsity ice hockey team the following season. He established himself as a reliable defenseman and was named team captain for his senior season. That year Jangro led the Eagles to a 19–7 record in the regular season, earning a bid to the 1959 NCAA Tournament. Jangro tied the game in the first period but the Eagles couldn't outlast Michigan State and fell 3–4. The team recovered enough to produce a barn-burner against St. Lawrence in the consolation game, winning 7–6 in overtime and cementing their unofficial title as Eastern Champions. Jangro was named to both the All-Tournament First Team and the All-American Team for the year.

After college, Jangro continued to play hockey, sticking with Minor-Pro squads in New England like the Merrimac Valley Chiefs and Manchester Blackhawks. He played at least until the early 1970's and then played senior hockey well into his 70's. Jangro was a co-founder of the Lionex Corporation and, after it was purchased in 1986, co-founded Advanced Media Services, Inc. with his son Bob.

== Personal ==
Joe and his wife Monica were married for 57 years and raised two boys, Joe jr. and Bob.

== Awards and honors ==
Award	Year
AHCA East All-American	1958–59
NCAA All-Tournament First Team	1959
