= Pat Presley =

Canadian ice hockey player (1935–2002)

Patrick “Pat” Presley
- Born: July 16, 1935 Ottawa, Ontario, Canada
- Died: 27 September 2002 (aged 67) Ottawa, Ontario, Canada
- Height: 6 ft 0 in (183 cm)
- Weight: 175 lb (79 kg; 12 st 7 lb)
- Position: Defence
- Shot: Left
- Played for: St. Lawrence; Milwaukee Falcons
- Playing career: 1956–1960

Merrill Patrick Presley (July 16, 1935 – September 27, 2002) was a Canadian ice hockey defenceman who was a 2-time All-American for St. Lawrence.

== Career ==
After finishing his junior career in the Quebec-area, Presley was able to earn an athletic scholarship to St. Lawrence, near his home town of Ottawa. After a year with the freshman team Presley became an instant hit not only for the Saints, but for all of college hockey. He became one of the select few players to earn First Team All-American honors in his first season of play despite the Larries performing less impressively than they had in recent seasons. In his junior season the team posted its worst season since World War II, winning just ten games and finishing last in the Tri-State League.

For his final season the team had a resurgence with Presley leading the defensive corps. He was again a First Team All-American, the first player in program history to achieve that feat, and pushed the Saints to an undefeated record in their conference. St. Lawrence returned to the tournament for the first time in three years and they met North Dakota in the semifinal. From the drop of the puck the Fighting Sioux dominated the Larries and built a 3-goal lead going into the third period. just when it looked like the Saints would be swept off the ice the team came alive and scored three times to tie the game and force overtime. Less than 5 minutes into the session, however, Presley's Saints were felled by a shot from the point that deflected in off of the crossbar. In the consolation game the Larries built three separate leads, only for Boston College to tie the game each time. Overtime was again required and while the game continued into a 5th frame, the result for St. Lawrence was the same as their previous game.

After his college career ended, Presley joined the new IHL team, the Milwaukee Falcons. Presley played one year for the team before retiring.

Presley was also a pitcher for the St. Lawrence baseball team and in 1987 he was inducted into the St. Lawrence Athletic Hall of Fame in both sports.

Presley died on September 27, 2002, at the age of 67.

== Statistics ==
=== Regular season and playoffs ===
			Regular season					Playoffs
Season	Team	League	GP	G	A	Pts	PIM	GP	G	A	Pts	PIM
1952–53	Ottawa Senators	QSHL	2	0	0	0	0	—	—	—	—	—
1953–54	Quebec Citadelles	OHA	17	7	5	12	28	—	—	—	—	—
1953–54	Quebec Frontenacs	QPJHL	33	4	11	15	20	—	—	—	—	—
1954–55	Quebec Frontenacs	QPJHL	44	4	12	16	115	—	—	—	—	—
1956–57	St. Lawrence	Tri-State League	—	—	—	—	—	—	—	—	—	—
1957–58	St. Lawrence	Tri-State League	—	—	—	—	—	—	—	—	—	—
1958–59	St. Lawrence	Tri-State League	—	—	—	—	—	—	—	—	—	—
1959–60	Milwaukee Falcons	IHL	64	3	14	17	72	—	—	—	—	—
NCAA totals			62	24	50	74	—	—	—	—	—	—

== Awards and honors ==
Award	Year
AHCA First Team All-American	1956–57
AHCA East All-American	1958–59
NCAA All-Tournament First Team	1959
