= 1959 NCAA men's ice hockey tournament =

College ice hockey tournament

- Teams: 4
- Finals site: RPI Field House, Troy, New York
- Champions: North Dakota Fighting Sioux (1st title)
- Runner-up: Michigan State Spartans (1st title game)
- Semifinalists: Boston College Eagles (6th Frozen Four); St. Lawrence Saints (4th Frozen Four)
- Winning coach: Bob May (1st title)
- MOP: Reg Morelli (North Dakota)

The 1959 NCAA Men's Ice Hockey Tournament was the culmination of the 1958–59 NCAA men's ice hockey season, the 12th such tournament in NCAA history. It was held between March 12 and 14, 1959, and concluded with North Dakota defeating Michigan State 4-3 in overtime. All games were played at the RPI Field House in Troy, New York.

As of 2026, this was the last tournament to be won by an independent school.

== Qualifying teams ==
Four teams qualified for the tournament, two each from the eastern and western regions. The Big Ten and Tri-State League champions received bids into the tournament as did two independent schools.

East							West						
Seed	School	Conference	Record	Berth type	Appearance	Last bid	Seed	School	Conference	Record	Berth type	Appearance	Last bid
1	St. Lawrence	Tri-State League	14–5–1	At-Large	4th	1956	1	Michigan State	Big Ten	16–5–1	At-Large	1st	Never
2	Boston College	Independent	19–7–0	At-Large	6th	1956	2	North Dakota	Independent	18–10–1	At-Large	2nd	1958

== Format ==
The Tri-State League champion was seeded as the top eastern team while the Big Ten champion was given the top western seed. The second eastern seed was slotted to play the top western seed and vice versa. All games were played at the RPI Field House. All matches were Single-game eliminations with the semifinal winners advancing to the national championship game and the losers playing in a consolation game.

== Bracket ==
Semifinals; March 12–13
E1	St. Lawrence	3
W2	North Dakota	4*
W1	Michigan State	4
E2	Boston College	3

National championship March 14
W2	North Dakota	4*
W1	Michigan State	3
Third-place game
E1	St. Lawrence	6
E2	Boston College	7**

Note: * denotes overtime period(s)

=== Semifinals ===
==== St. Lawrence vs. North Dakota ====
March 12	St. Lawrence	3 – 4	OT	North Dakota	RPI Field House

==== Michigan State vs. Boston College ====
March 13	Michigan State	4 – 3	Boston College	RPI Field House
(LaCoste, Roberts) Tom Mustonen - 03:50		First period	07:50 - Joe Jangro (Daley)
(Polano) Dick Hamilton - 03:11 (Mustonen) Jack Roberts - 05:33 (Polano) Terry Moroney - GW - 08:10		Second period	No scoring
No scoring		Third period	05:34 - Bill Daley (Jangro); 11:54 - Robert Leonard (Cusack)

=== Consolation Game ===
==== St. Lawrence vs. Boston College ====
March 14	St. Lawrence	6 – 7	2OT	Boston College	RPI Field House
(Slater, Lawler) Al Dalbec - 10:56 (Brachaud) Larry Langill - 18:53		First period		No scoring
(Hicks, Slater) Dan McKillip - 08:21 (unassisted) Larry Langill - 10:44 (Langill, Branchaud) Paul Gaudet - 16:33		Second period		05:03 - PP - Jack Cusack (Pergola, Leonard); 06:35 - Bill Daley (Martin); 15:38 - Ron Walsh (Daley)
(Branchaud) Paul Gaudet - 10:44		Third period		07:43 - PP - Dave Pergola (Cusack); 10:01 - PP - Dick Riley (Daley); 11:03 - Ed Smith (Madden, O'Neill)
No scoring		Second overtime period		06:51 - GW - Jack Cusack (unassisted)
(31 saves) Bob Steer		Goalie stats		Jim Logue/Bob Rudman (48 saves)

=== National Championship ===
==== Michigan State vs. North Dakota ====
March 14	Michigan State	3 – 4	OT	North Dakota	RPI Field House

Scoring summary
Period	Team	Goal	Assist(s)	Time	Score
1st	MSU	Ed Pollesel	Mustonen and LaCoste	14:38	1–0 MSU
2nd	UND	Ralph Lyndon	Morelli and Miller	27:21	1–1
2nd	UND	Gerry Walford	King and Haley	28:57	2–1 UND
2nd	UND	Stan Paschke	Lyndon	29:37	3–1 UND
3rd	MSU	Andre LaCoste	Roberts and Norman	48:05	3–2 UND
3rd	MSU	Jack Roberts	LaCoste	56:20	3–3
1st Overtime	UND	Reg Morelli – GW	Miller and LaFrance	64:18	4–3 UND
Penalty summary
Period	Team	Player	Penalty	Time	PIM
1st	MSU	Bob Armstrong	Cross-checking	8:42	2:00
1st	MSU	Ed Pollesel	Slashing	15:40	2:00
1st	UND	Ralph Lyndon	Interference	18:32	2:00
2nd	UND	Art Miller	Tripping	24:11	2:00
2nd	UND	Reg Morelli	Hooking	31:19	2:00
2nd	MSU	Bob Norman	Cross-checking	32:43	2:00
2nd	UND	Art Miller	Roughing	33:28	2:00
2nd	MSU	Bruno Pollesel	Roughing	33:28	2:00
2nd	UND	Guy LaFrance	Tripping	35:29	2:00
2nd	UND	Julian Brunetta	Interference	36:47	2:00
3rd	UND	Julian Brunetta	High-sticking	44:36	2:00
3rd	MSU	Bob Norman	High-sticking	44:36	2:00
3rd	MSU	Ed Pollesel	Tripping	48:49	2:00
3rd	MSU	Bob Norman	High-sticking	56:38	2:00
3rd	UND	Les Merrifield	Interference	56:38	2:00
1st Overtime	MSU	Tom Mustonen	Tripping	63:01	2:00
1st Overtime	UND	Ralph Lyndon	Tripping	63:13	2:00

Shots by period
Team	1	2	3	OT	T
North Dakota	5	17	7	1	30
Michigan State	6	4	13	1	24

Goaltenders
Team	Name	Saves	Goals against	Time on ice
UND	George Gratton	21	3	
MSU	Joe Selinger	26	4	

== All-Tournament team ==
=== First Team ===
- G: Joe Selinger (Michigan State)
- D: Joe Jangro (Boston College)
- D: Pat Presley (St. Lawrence)
- F: Reg Morelli* (North Dakota)
- F: Bill MacKenzie (Michigan State)
- F: Ed Thomlinson (North Dakota)

* Most Outstanding Player(s)

=== Second Team ===
- G: Jim Logue (Boston College)
- D: Ralph Lyndon (North Dakota)
- D: Ed Pollesel (Michigan State)
- F: Larry Langill (St. Lawrence)
- F: Tom Mustonen (Michigan State)
- F: Joe Poole (North Dakota)
