= St. Paul Saints (IHL) =

Defunct American ice hockey team

- City: Saint Paul, Minnesota
- League: International Hockey League
- Founded: 1959
- Folded: 1963
- Home arena: St. Paul Auditorium
- Colors: Black, yellow and white

Franchise history
- 1955–1957: St. Paul Peter's Meats
- 1957–1958: St. Paul K.S.T.P.
- 1958–1959: St. Paul Capitols
- 1959–1963: St. Paul Saints

Championships
- Regular season titles: 1 (1960)
- Turner Cups: 2 (1960, 1961)

The St. Paul Saints, also known as the Fighting Saints, were a minor league professional ice hockey team that played in the International Hockey League from 1959 to 1963. The Saints were based in St. Paul, Minnesota and played at the St. Paul Auditorium. The Saints won consecutive Turner Cups in 1960 and 1961 as league champions, and finished runners-up in 1962. Their geographically closest rival were the Minneapolis Millers, across the river.

== History ==
Originally founded as the St. Paul Peter's Meats for the inaugural season of the United States Central Hockey League, St. Paul played for four seasons as a semi-professional club before joining the International Hockey League in 1959. When they did so, the team took on the same name (St. Paul Saints) as at least five previous outfits (two hockey, three baseball).

== Season-by-season results ==
Season	Games	Won	Lost	Tied	Points	Winning %	Goals for	Goals against	Standing
1959–60	68	41	21	6	88	0.647	261	188	1st, West
1960–61	72	46	22	4	96	0.667	309	233	2nd, West
1961–62	68	42	25	1	85	0.625	291	209	2nd, IHL
1962–63	70	23	44	3	49	0.350	241	328	6th, IHL
