= 1958–59 NCAA men's ice hockey season =

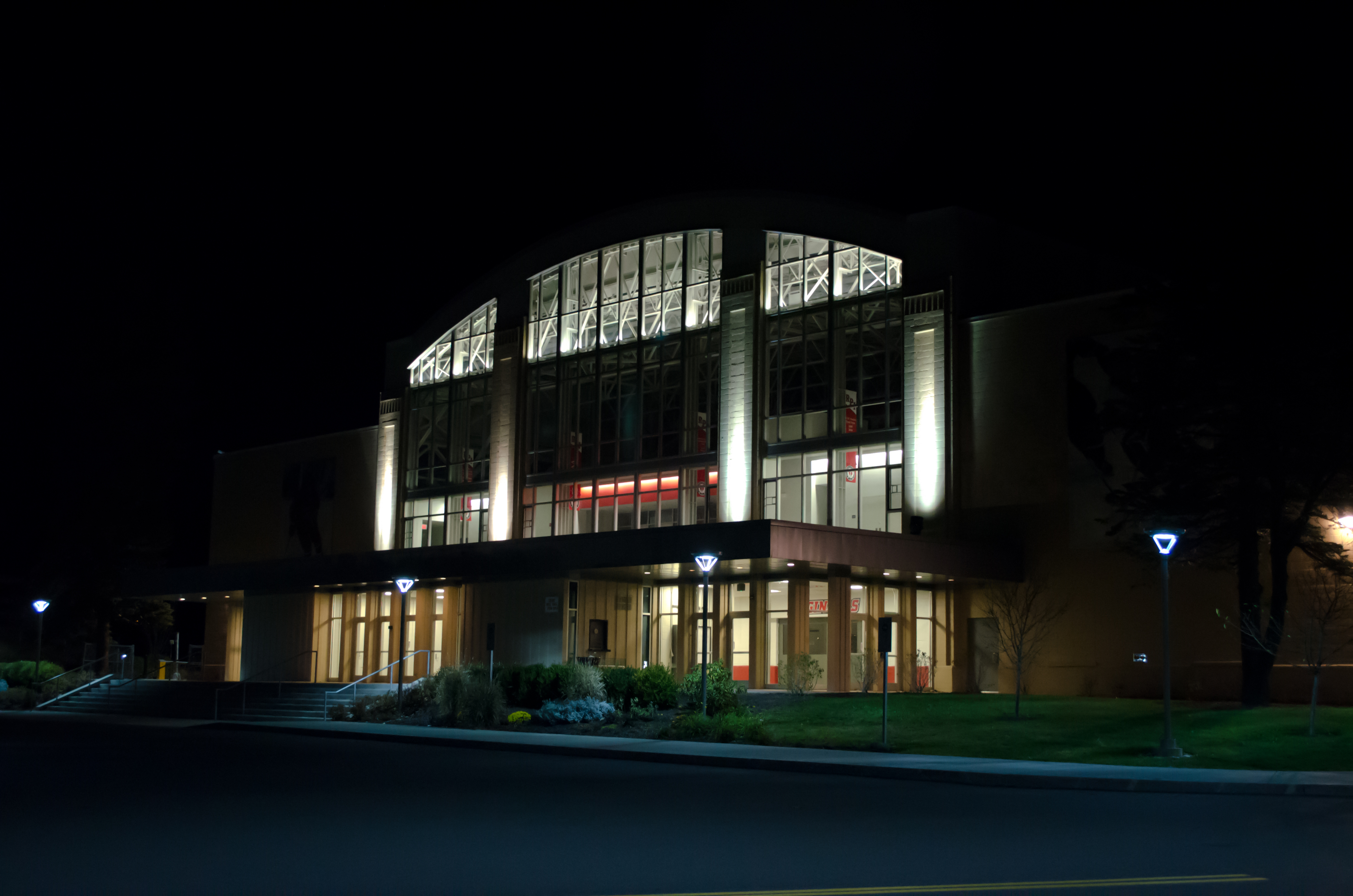
- The RPI Field House served as the host for the 1959 Tournament
- Duration: November 1958– March 14, 1959
- NCAA tournament: 1959
- National championship: RPI Field House; Troy, New York
- NCAA champion: North Dakota

The 1958–59 NCAA men's ice hockey season began in November 1958 and concluded with the 1959 NCAA Men's Ice Hockey Tournament's championship game on March 14, 1959 at the RPI Field House in Troy, New York. This was the 12th season in which an NCAA ice hockey championship was held and is the 65th year overall where an NCAA school fielded a team.

After the previous season the WIHL dissolved due to an argument between member universities over recruiting practices, namely the tendency of Colorado College, Denver and North Dakota to recruit overage Canadian players. In time the practice would eventually lead to Denver's appearance in the 1973 tournament being vacated but rules prohibiting such recruits did not exist at the time. Due to the dissolution of the WIHL the three schools belonging to the Big Ten Conference formed their own ice hockey division.

== Regular season ==
=== Season tournaments ===
Tournament	Dates	Teams	Champion
Boston Arena Christmas Tournament	December 26–30	8	Michigan State
Cornell Invitational	January 1–3	6	New Hampshire
Rensselaer Holiday Tournament	January 1–3	4	Michigan State
Beanpot	February 2, 9	4	Boston College

=== Standings ===
1958–59 Big Ten standings
	Conference							Overall					
	GP	W	L	T	PTS	GF	GA	GP	W	L	T	GF	GA
Michigan State†	8	5	2	1	11	30	26	24	17	6	1	115	64
Minnesota	8	4	3	1	9	40	28	24	12	10	2	105	85
Michigan	8	2	6	0	4	12	36	22	8	13	1	84	97
† indicates conference regular season champion

1958–59 NCAA Independent ice hockey standings
	Intercollegiate							Overall					
	GP	W	L	T	Pct.	GF	GA	GP	W	L	T	GF	GA
Amherst	–	–	–	–	–	–	–	17	10	7	0	–	–
American International	–	–	–	–	–	–	–	20	6	14	0	–	–
Army	19	9	9	1	.500	78	64	20	9	10	1	79	70
Boston College	–	–	–	–	–	–	–	28	20	8	0	136	105
Boston University	23	13	8	2	.609	106	81	23	13	8	2	106	81
Bowdoin	–	–	–	–	–	–	–	19	7	11	1	–	–
Brown	–	–	–	–	–	–	–	24	10	14	0	84	109
Colby	–	–	–	–	–	–	–	19	10	8	1	–	–
Colgate	–	–	–	–	–	–	–	8	2	6	0	33	68
Colorado College	–	–	–	–	–	–	–	23	6	14	3	86	110
Cornell	–	–	–	–	–	–	–	21	4	16	1	45	166
Dartmouth	–	–	–	–	–	–	–	25	17	8	0	126	97
Denver	–	–	–	–	–	–	–	28	22	5	1	194	86
Hamilton	–	–	–	–	–	–	–	18	8	9	1	–	–
Harvard	–	–	–	–	–	–	–	25	12	9	4	126	79
Massachusetts	–	–	–	–	–	–	–	12	3	9	0	36	52
Merrimack	–	–	–	–	–	–	–	12	7	5	0	105	67
MIT	–	–	–	–	–	–	–	13	1	11	1	–	–
Michigan Tech	–	–	–	–	–	–	–	27	16	10	1	116	88
New Hampshire	–	–	–	–	–	–	–	19	14	5	0	99	49
North Dakota	26	18	8	0	.692	104	83	31	20	10	1	125	103
Northeastern	–	–	–	–	–	–	–	24	12	11	0	98	99
Norwich	–	–	–	–	–	–	–	18	8	10	0	–	–
Princeton	–	–	–	–	–	–	–	23	6	16	1	73	102
Providence	–	–	–	–	–	–	–	21	7	13	1	95	94
St. Olaf	–	–	–	–	–	–	–	13	10	3	0	–	–
Tufts	–	–	–	–	–	–	–	14	6	7	1	–	–
Williams	–	–	–	–	–	–	–	17	7	10	0	–	–
Yale	–	–	–	–	–	–	–	21	11	9	1	94	71

1958–59 Minnesota Intercollegiate Athletic Conference ice hockey standings
	Conference							Overall					
	GP	W	L	T	PTS	GF	GA	GP	W	L	T	GF	GA
Minnesota–Duluth †	7	7	0	0	1.000	–	–	20	10	9	1	–	–
Augsburg	–	–	–	–	–	–	–	–	–	–	–	–	–
Concordia	–	–	–	–	–	–	–	8	1	7	0	–	–
Gustavus Adolphus	–	–	–	–	–	–	–	13	6	7	0	–	–
Hamline	–	–	–	–	–	–	–	–	–	–	–	–	–
Macalester	–	–	–	–	–	–	–	–	–	–	–	–	–
Saint John's	–	–	–	–	–	–	–	14	9	5	0	–	–
Saint Mary's	–	–	–	–	–	–	–	12	1	9	2	–	–
St. Thomas	–	–	–	–	–	–	–	14	10	4	0	–	–
† indicates conference champion

1958–59 Tri-State League standings
	Conference							Overall					
	GP	W	L	T	PTS	GF	GA	GP	W	L	T	GF	GA
St. Lawrence†	5	5	0	0	12	34	18	22	14	7	1	134	81
Rensselaer	5	2	3	0	6	21	24	21	13	8	0	120	90
Clarkson	5	2	3	0	6	23	20	19	10	8	1	108	66
Middlebury	3	0	3	0	0			20	11	8	1	–	–
† indicates conference regular season champion

== 1959 NCAA Tournament ==
Semifinals; March 12–13
E1	St. Lawrence	3
W2	North Dakota	4*
W1	Michigan State	4
E2	Boston College	3

National championship March 14
W2	North Dakota	4*
W1	Michigan State	3
Third-place game
E1	St. Lawrence	6
E2	Boston College	7**

Note: * denotes overtime period(s)

== Player stats ==
=== Scoring leaders ===
The following players led the league in points at the conclusion of the season.

GP = Games played; G = Goals; A = Assists; Pts = Points; PIM = Penalty minutes

Player	Class	Team	GP	G	A	Pts	PIM
Phil Latreille	Sophomore	Middlebury	20	57	33	90	-
Paul Midghall	Junior	Rensselaer	21	29	49	78	44
Ray Belasky	Junior	Rensselaer	21	37	33	70	23
Art Chisholm	Sophomore	Northeastern	23	40	25	65	35
Jim Brown	Junior	Denver	28	24	38	62	-
Bob Marquis	Junior	Boston University	-	41	18	59	-
John Kosiancic	Junior	Michigan Tech	27	25	28	53	26
Terry Slater	Sophomore	St. Lawrence	22	21	29	50	4
Bill Masterton	Sophomore	Denver	23	21	28	49	6
Paul Coppo	Junior	Michigan Tech	25	18	31	49	4

=== Leading goaltenders ===
The following goaltenders led the league in goals against average at the end of the regular season while playing at least 33% of their team's total minutes.

GP = Games played; Min = Minutes played; W = Wins; L = Losses; OT = Overtime/shootout losses; GA = Goals against; SO = Shutouts; SV% = Save percentage; GAA = Goals against average

Player	Class	Team	GP	Min	W	L	OT	GA	SO	SV%	GAA
Joe Selinger	Senior	Michigan State	24	-	-	-	-	-	4	-	2.67
George Gratton	Sophomore	North Dakota	15	-	-	-	-	-	0	.876	2.73
Rodney Schneck	Senior	Denver	-	-	22	-	-	-	1	.876	2.97
Robert Peabody	Senior	North Dakota	20	-	-	-	-	-	1	.868	3.20
George Cuculick	Junior	Michigan Tech	20	-	-	-	-	-	-	.889	3.15
Gerry Jones	Senior	Yale	-	-	-	-	-	-	-	-	3.21
Ron Tanner	Sophomore	Boston University	23	-	-	-	-	-	-	.884	3.22
Bill Armstrong	Sophomore	Clarkson	19	-	10	-	-	-	-	.889	3.40
Larry Palmer	Senior	Army	19	1132	8	10	1	67	1	.900	3.55
Bob Steer	Junior	St. Lawrence	20	1246	-	-	-	74	0	.887	3.56

== Awards ==
=== NCAA ===
Award		Recipient
Spencer Penrose Award		John "Snooks" Kelley, Boston College
Most Outstanding Player in NCAA Tournament		Reg Morelli, North Dakota
AHCA All-American Teams
East Team	Position	West Team
Gerry Jones, Yale	G	Joe Selinger, Michigan State
Joe Jangro, Boston College	D	Bill Steenson, North Dakota
Pat Presley, St. Lawrence	D	Bob Watt, Michigan
Bob Marquis, Boston University	F	John Kosiancic, Michigan Tech
Paul Midghall, Rensselaer	F	Bob White, Michigan
Phil Latreille, Middlebury	F	Murray Williamson, Minnesota
