= Eveleth Rangers =

American former amateur ice hockey team

- City: Eveleth, Minnesota, U.S.
- League: Independent (1919–20); USAHA (1920–1925); CAHL (1925–26); CHL (1931–1935); IAHL (1936–1939); NAHL (1946–1951); AAHL (1951–1952)
- Home arena: Eveleth Hippodrome; Hibbing Memorial Arena (1925–26)

Franchise history
- 1919–1925: Eveleth Reds
- 1925–1926: Eveleth-Hibbing Rangers
- 1931–1952: Eveleth Rangers
- 1952–1953: Eveleth-Virginia Rangers

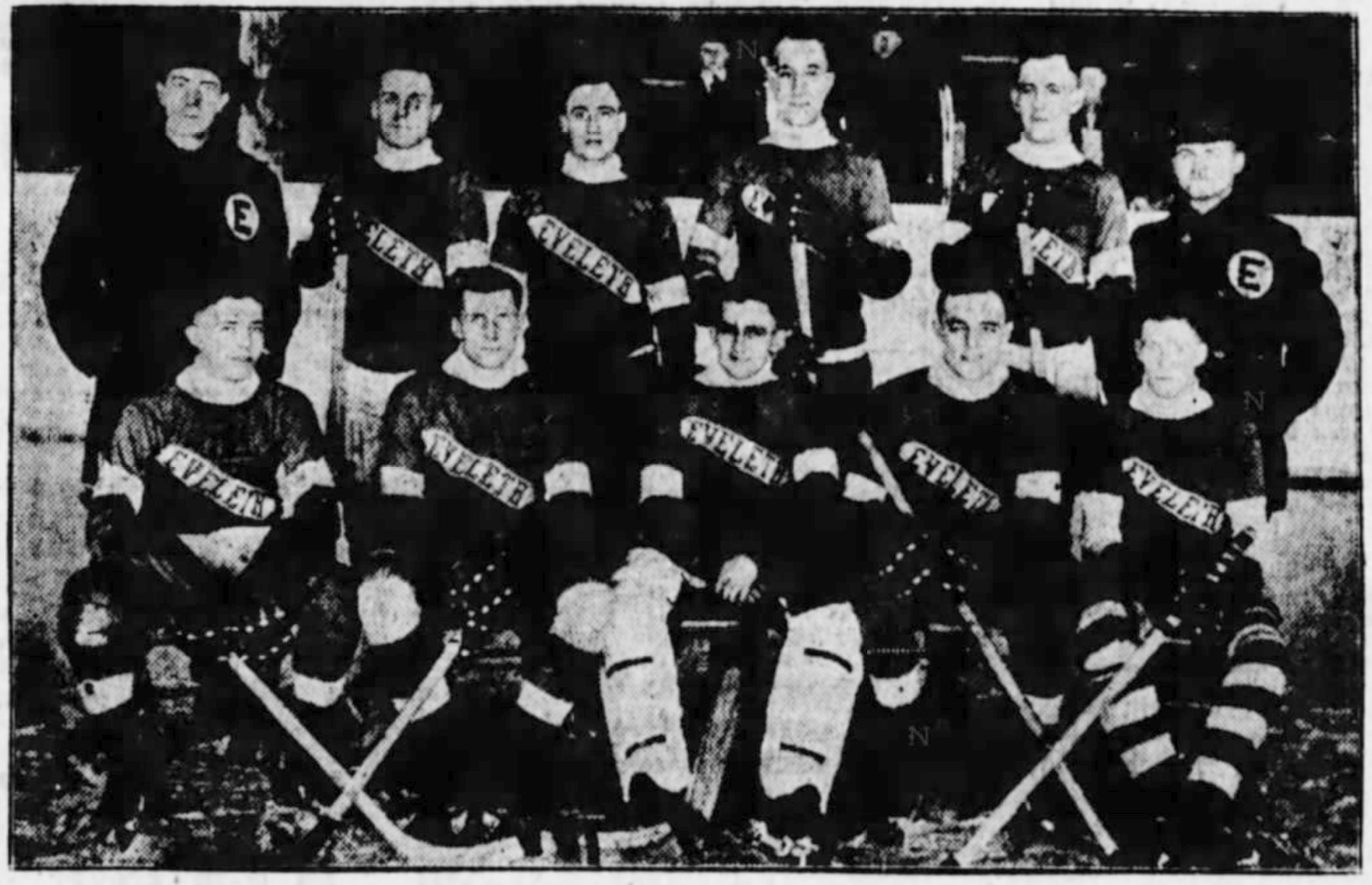
Eveleth team in 1920–21, Ching Johnson is seated second from right in the front row.

The Eveleth Rangers were an amateur ice hockey team from Eveleth, Minnesota that played in various amateur leagues during the first half of the 1900s. As a member of the United States Amateur Hockey Association (1920–1925) the team was known as the Eveleth Reds, and in 1925–26 they played as the Eveleth-Hibbing Rangers in the CAHL, out of the Hibbing Memorial Arena in Hibbing, Minnesota.

== History ==
During the inaugural USAHA season in 1920–21 Eveleth finished as runner-ups after having lost the final four-game series to the Cleveland Indians by a 12-14 aggregate score. The biggest star player on the team in the early 1920s was defenseman Ivan "Ching" Johnson, who had joined the club from the Winnipeg Monarchs.

== Notable players ==
- Ching Johnson – Hockey Hall of Fame inductee
- Vic Desjardins – United States Hockey Hall of Fame inductee
- Percy Galbraith
- Jimmy Herbert
- Eddie Rodden
- Laurie Scott
