= Denver Mavericks =

American professional ice hockey team

Denver Mavericks logo

The Denver Mavericks were a minor league professional ice hockey team in the International Hockey League during the first half of the 1959–1960 season. They played at the Denver Coliseum in Denver, Colorado.

The Mavericks were an expansion team and recruited most of its players at colleges in Colorado. The IHL pulled the franchise from the original owners, Mile High Hockey Inc., and gave it to a Denver group headed by David M. Segal. The new ownership refinanced the team, but the changes did not solve the team's financial problems. On December 3, 1959, the team moved becoming the Minneapolis Millers. The Mavericks were in Denver for only 34 days, and finished their tenure in Denver with a 10–8 record.
