= Minneapolis Millers (IHL) =

The Minneapolis Millers were a minor league professional ice hockey team in the International Hockey League for four seasons from 1959 to 1963. The Millers played at the 5,500-seat Minneapolis Arena in Uptown, Minneapolis, Minnesota. The Millers were created on December 3, 1959, upon the relocating of the Denver Mavericks franchise. The Mavericks had rivalry with the St. Paul Saints team, that continued with the relocation. The Millers were 1963 Turner Cup finalists.
