= Rochester Mustangs =

- City: Rochester, Minnesota
- League: United States Hockey League
- Founded: 1947
- Folded: 1970
- Home arena: Rochester Recreation Center
- Colors: Yellow, white, and black

Franchise history
- 1947–1970: Rochester Mustangs

The Rochester Mustangs were a senior ice hockey team from Rochester, Minnesota that operated from 1947 until ceasing operations after the 1969-70 season.

== History ==
The Mustangs began as a founding member of the semi-professional American Amateur Hockey League in 1947. The club remained in the league through its many iterations, eventually leading to the United States Hockey League. The franchise suspended play in 1970 but the name was later revived by a second USHL team once the league had become a junior circuit.

== Notable players ==
- Herb Brooks, NHL head coach and coach of the U.S. "Miracle on Ice" gold medal team at the 1980 Winter Olympics
- Craig Falkman, played in the WHA with the Minnesota Fighting Saints
- Robert W. Fleming, U.S Olympic hockey executive, Patrick Trophy winner (1995), and Mayo Clinic executive
- Gary Gambucci, NHL and WHA player
- Ken Johannson, Canadian-born American ice hockey player, coach and general manager of the United States men's national ice hockey team
- George Konik, NHL and WHA player
- Leonard Lilyholm, U.S. Olympian and player with the WHA's Minnesota Fighting Saints
- Lou Nanne, player, coach and general manager of the Minnesota North Stars
- Art Strobel, played in the NHL with the New York Rangers
