= List of Michigan Tech Huskies men's ice hockey seasons =

This is a season-by-season list of records compiled by Michigan Tech in men's ice hockey.

Michigan Technological University has won three NCAA Championship in its history, the most recent coming in 1975 (as of 2018).

== Season-by-season results ==
Note: GP = Games played, W = Wins, L = Losses, T = Ties

NCAA D-I Champions	NCAA Frozen Four	Conference regular season champions	Conference Playoff Champions

Season	Conference	Regular Season (Note: Code explanation; GP—Games Played, W—Wins, L—Losses, T—Tied games, OTW—Overtime Wins, OTL—Overtime Loses, 3/SW—Win in 3 on 3 overtime or shootout, Pts—Points*)														Conference Tournament Results	National Tournament Results
Season	Conference	Conference									Overall					Conference Tournament Results	National Tournament Results
Season	Conference	GP	W	L	T	OTW	OTL	3/SW	Pts*	Finish	GP	W	L	T	%	Conference Tournament Results	National Tournament Results
E. R. Lovell (1919–1920)
1919–20	Independent	–	–	–	–	–	–	–	–	–	4	1	2	1	.375		
Elmer Sicotte (1920–1921)
1920–21	Independent	–	–	–	–	–	–	–	–	–	11	7	4	0	.636		
Mike Fay (1921–1922)
1921–22	Independent	–	–	–	–	–	–	–	–	–	12	8	3	1	.708		
Bill Murdoch (1922–1923)
1922–23	Independent	–	–	–	–	–	–	–	–	–	4	0	4	0	.000		
Elmer Sicotte (1923–1924)
1923–24	Independent	–	–	–	–	–	–	–	–	–	5	0	5	0	.000		
Leon Harvey (1924–1926)
1924–25	Independent	–	–	–	–	–	–	–	–	–	6	2	4	0	.333		
1925–26	Independent	–	–	–	–	–	–	–	–	–	5	2	2	1	.500		
Carlos Haug (1926–1929)
1926–27	Independent	–	–	–	–	–	–	–	–	–	6	5	1	0	.833		
1927–28	Independent	–	–	–	–	–	–	–	–	–	6	5	1	0	.833		
1928–29	Independent	–	–	–	–	–	–	–	–	–	13	2	8	3	.269		
Bert Noblet (1929–1936)
1929–30	Independent	–	–	–	–	–	–	–	–	–	13	5	7	1	.423		
1930–31	Independent	–	–	–	–	–	–	–	–	–	9	2	7	0	.222		
1931–32	Independent	–	–	–	–	–	–	–	–	–	13	5	6	2	.462		
1932–33	Independent	–	–	–	–	–	–	–	–	–	15	9	5	1	.633		
1933–34	Independent	–	–	–	–	–	–	–	–	–	22	13	8	1	.614		
1934–35	Independent	–	–	–	–	–	–	–	–	–	17	4	11	2	.294		
1935–36	Independent	–	–	–	–	–	–	–	–	–	16	6	9	1	.406		
Joe Savini (1936–1938)
1936–37	Independent	–	–	–	–	–	–	–	–	–	18	7	8	3	.472		
1937–38	Independent	–	–	–	–	–	–	–	–	–	16	4	11	1	.281		
Ed Maki (1938–1941)
1938–39	Independent	–	–	–	–	–	–	–	–	–	14	6	8	0	.429		
1939–40	Independent	–	–	–	–	–	–	–	–	–	15	10	5	0	.667		
1940–41	Independent	–	–	–	–	–	–	–	–	–	11	1	10	0	.091		
Elwin Romnes (1941–1943)
1941–42	Independent	–	–	–	–	–	–	–	–	–	12	3	6	3	.375		
1942–43	Independent	–	–	–	–	–	–	–	–	–	10	1	9	0	.100		
Program Suspended due to World War II
Ed Maki (1945–1948)
1945–46	Independent	–	–	–	–	–	–	–	–	–	16	4	12	0	.250		
1946–47	Independent	–	–	–	–	–	–	–	–	–	19	6	13	0	.316		
1947–48	Independent	–	–	–	–	–	–	–	–	–	20	8	12	0	.400		
Amo Bessone (1948–1951)
1948–49	Independent	–	–	–	–	–	–	–	–	–	15	5	10	0	.333		
1949–50	Independent	–	–	–	–	–	–	–	–	–	17	10	7	0	.588		
1950–51	Independent	–	–	–	–	–	–	–	–	–	21	5	14	2	.286		
Al Renfrew (1951–1956)
1951–52	MCHL	12	0	12	0	–	–	–	0	7th	20	2	18	0	.100		
1952–53	MCHL	16	3	13	0	–	–	–	4	6th	19	6	13	0	.316		
1953–54	WIHL	18	2	16	0	–	–	–	2	7th	25	7	17	1	.300		
1954–55	WIHL	20	8	11	1	–	–	–	10½	T–4th	26	12	13	1	.481		
1955–56	WIHL	20	14	6	0	–	–	–	17	2nd	28	21	7	0	.891		Won Semifinal, 10–4 (Boston College); Lost Championship, 5–7 (Michigan)
John MacInnes (1956–1982)
1956–57	WIHL	20	8	8	4	–	–	–	12½	4th	28	14	9	5	.589		
1957–58	WIHL	20	5	15	0	–	–	–	5	7th	28	11	16	1	.411		
1958–59	Independent	–	–	–	–	–	–	–	–	–	27	16	10	1	.611		
1959–60	WCHA	22	15	6	1	–	–	–	.705	2nd	32	21	10	1	.672	Won Final series, 9–7 (North Dakota)	Won Semifinal, 13–3 (St. Lawrence); Lost Championship, 3–5 (Denver)
1960–61	WCHA	24	13	11	0	–	–	–	.542	4th	29	16	13	0	.552	Lost Final series, 3–17 (Denver)	
1961–62	WCHA	20	17	3	0	–	–	–	.850	1st	32	29	3	0	.906	Won First round, 5–1 (Michigan State); Won Championship, 6–4 (Michigan)	Won Semifinal, 6–1 (St. Lawrence); Won Championship, 7–1 (Clarkson)
1962–63	WCHA	20	11	7	2	–	–	–	.600	3rd	29	17	10	2	.621	Lost First round series, 1–8 (North Dakota)	
1963–64	WCHA	16	9	7	0	–	–	–	.563	4th	27	14	12	1	.537	Lost First round series, 8–9 (Michigan)	
University Division
1964–65	WCHA	18	12	5	1	–	–	–	.694	2nd	31	24	5	2	.806	Won First round, 11–7 (Minnesota); Won Championship, 6–4 (North Dakota)	Won Semifinal, 4–0 (St. Lawrence); Won Championship, 8–2 (Boston College)
1965–66	WCHA	20	15	4	1	–	–	–	.775	1st	30	23	6	1	.783	Won First round, 9–3 (Minnesota–Duluth); Lost Second round, 3–4 (Michigan State)	
1966–67	WCHA	22	14	7	1	–	–	–	.659	3rd	30	18	11	1	.617	Won First round, 6–4 (Minnesota–Duluth); Lost Second round, 1–2 (OT) (Michigan State)	
1967–68	WCHA	20	15	5	0	–	–	–	.750	2nd	32	22	9	1	.703	Won First round, 5–2 (Colorado College); Lost Second round series, 2–3 (North Dakota)	
1968–69	WCHA	20	14	5	1	–	–	–	.725	1st	32	21	9	2	.813	Won East regional semifinal, 4–2 (Michigan State); Won East Regional Final, 7–4 (Michigan)	Lost Semifinal, 3–4 (OT) (Cornell); Lost Third-place game, 5–6 (2OT) (Harvard)
1969–70	WCHA	22	12	7	3	–	–	–	.614	T–2nd	34	19	12	3	.603	Won East regional semifinal, 5–3 (North Dakota); Won East Regional Final, 6–5 (Minnesota)	Lost Semifinal, 3–4 (Clarkson); Lost Third-place game, 5–6 (Wisconsin)
1970–71	WCHA	22	18	4	0	–	–	–	.818	1st	33	25	6	2	.788	Lost East regional semifinal, 4–6 (North Dakota)	
1971–72	WCHA	26	11	15	0	–	–	–	30	7th	34	16	17	1	.485	Lost First round series, 6–9 (Wisconsin)	
1972–73	WCHA	26	16	10	0	–	–	–	44	5th	38	24	13	1	.645	Won First round series, 8–5 (Michigan State); Lost Second round series, 3–7 (Denver)	
Division I
1973–74	WCHA	28	20	6	2	–	–	–	42	1st	40	28	9	3	.738	Won First round series, 6–4 (Notre Dame); Won Second round series, 12–10 (Michigan State)	Won Semifinal, 6–5 (OT) (Harvard); Lost Championship, 2–4 (Minnesota)
1974–75	WCHA	32	22	10	0	–	–	–	44	2nd	42	32	10	0	.762	Won First round series, 8–3 (Notre Dame); Won Second round series, 15–8 (Michigan State)	Won Semifinal, 9–5 (Boston University); Won Championship, 6–1 (Minnesota)
1975–76	WCHA	32	25	7	0	–	–	–	50	1st	43	34	9	0	.791	Won First round series, 13–10 (Denver); Won Second round series, 10–7 (Michigan)	Won Semifinal, 7–6 (OT) (Brown); Lost Championship, 4–6 (Minnesota)
1976–77	WCHA	32	15	16	1	–	–	–	31	6th	38	19	18	1	.513	Lost First round series, 7–11 (Michigan)	
1977–78	WCHA	32	21	11	0	–	–	–	42	3rd	40	25	14	1	.638	Won First round series, 5–4 (North Dakota); Lost Second round series, 7–11 (Wisconsin)	
1978–79	WCHA	32	13	16	3	–	–	–	29	7th	38	17	18	3	.487	Lost First round series, 4–11 (Minnesota)	
1979–80	WCHA	28	12	14	2	–	–	–	.464	7th	38	18	18	2	.500	Lost First round series, 5–13 (Minnesota)	
1980–81	WCHA	28	17	11	0	–	–	–	34	T–2nd	44	29	14	1	.670	Won First round series, 11–5 (North Dakota); Won Second round series, 9–2 (Michigan)	Won Quarterfinal series, 13–8 (Providence); Lost Semifinal, 2–7 (Minnesota); Won Third-place game, 5–2 (Northern Michigan)
1981–82	CCHA	28	16	11	1	–	–	–	33	3rd	40	23	14	3	.613	Won Quarterfinal series, 10–7 (Ferris State); Lost Semifinal, 2–3 (Michigan State); Lost Consolation Game, 1–2 (Bowling Green)	
Jim Nahrgang (1982–1985)
1982–83	CCHA	32	20	12	0	–	–	–	40	4th	40	22	17	1	.563	Lost Quarterfinal series, 5–7 (Northern Michigan)	
1983–84	CCHA	30	14	16	0	–	–	–	.467	T–6th	41	19	21	1	.476	Lost Quarterfinal series, 4–8 (Michigan State)	
1984–85	WCHA	34	13	20	1	–	–	–	27	8th	40	15	24	1	.388	Lost First round series, 4–8 (Minnesota–Duluth)	
Herb Boxer (1985–1990)
1985–86	WCHA	34	9	22	3	–	–	–	21	8th	40	10	26	4	.300	Lost First round series, 6–9 (Denver)	
1986–87	WCHA	35	11	23	1	–	–	–	23	T–7th	40	11	28	1	.288	Lost First round series, 9–17 (Minnesota)	
1987–88	WCHA	35	19	15	1	–	–	–	39	4th	41	20	20	1	.500	Lost First round series, 1–2 (North Dakota)	
1988–89	WCHA	35	15	19	1	–	–	–	31	6th	42	15	25	2	.381	Lost First round series, 0–2 (Wisconsin)	
1989–90	WCHA	28	6	22	0	–	–	–	12	8th	40	10	30	0	.250	Lost First round series, 0–2 (Wisconsin)	
Newell Brown (1990–1992)
1990–91	WCHA	32	9	21	2	–	–	–	20	7th	41	13	25	3	.354	Lost First round series, 0–2 (Minnesota)	
1991–92	WCHA	32	14	17	1	–	–	–	29	6th	39	16	22	1	.423	Lost First round series, 0–2 (Northern Michigan)	
Bob Mancini (1992–1996)
1992–93	WCHA	32	15	12	5	–	–	–	35	4th	37	17	15	5	.527	Won First round series, 2–0 (St. Cloud State); Lost Quarterfinal, 3–4 (Northern Michigan)	
1993–94	WCHA	32	8	19	5	–	–	–	21	10th	45	13	27	5	.344	Won First round series, 2–1 (Colorado College); Won Quarterfinal, 5–1 (Northern Michigan); Lost Semifinal, 1–6 (Minnesota); Lost Third-place game, 3–8 (Wisconsin)	
1994–95	WCHA	32	12	17	3	–	–	–	27	8th	39	15	20	4	.436	Lost First round series, 0–2 (Denver)	
1995–96	WCHA	32	12	14	6	–	–	–	30	7th	42	18	18	6	.500	Won First round series, 2–0 (Minnesota–Duluth); Won Quarterfinal, 4–3 (OT) (St. Cloud State); Won Semifinal, 4–3 (Colorado College); Lost Championship, 2–7 (Minnesota)	
Tim Watters (1996–2000)
1996–97	WCHA	32	5	23	4	–	–	–	14	10th	39	8	27	4	.256	Lost First round series, 0–2 (North Dakota)	
1997–98	WCHA	28	10	17	1	–	–	–	21	7th	40	17	20	3	.463	Lost First round series, 1–2 (St. Cloud State)	
1998–99	WCHA	28	9	19	0	–	–	–	18	8th	38	9	28	1	.250	Lost First round series, 0–2 (Denver)	
1999–00	WCHA	28	2	26	0	–	–	–	4	10th	38	4	34	0	.105	Lost First round series, 0–2 (Wisconsin)	
Mike Sertich (2000–2003)
2000–01	WCHA	28	6	19	3	–	–	–	15	8th	36†	8†	24†	4†	.278	Lost First round series, 0–2 (Minnesota)	
2001–02	WCHA	28	4	22	2	–	–	–	10	10th	38	8	28	2	.237	Lost First round series, 0–2 (Denver)	
2002–03	WCHA	28	7	18	3	–	–	–	17	9th	38	10	24	4	.316	Lost First round series, 0–2 (Minnesota)	
Jamie Russell (2003–2011)
2003–04	WCHA	28	6	19	3	–	–	–	15	10th	38	8	25	5	.276	Lost First round series, 0–2 (North Dakota)	
2004–05	WCHA	28	7	19	2	–	–	–	16	10th	37	8	25	4	.270	Lost First round series, 0–2 (Denver)	
2005–06	WCHA	28	6	16	6	–	–	–	18	8th	38	7	25	6	.263	Lost First round series, 0–2 (Wisconsin)	
2006–07	WCHA	28	11	12	5	–	–	–	27	T–6th	40	18	17	5	.513	Won First round series, 2–1 (Colorado College); Lost Quarterfinal, 0–4 (Wisconsin)	
2007–08	WCHA	28	9	15	4	–	–	–	22	9th	39	14	20	5	.423	Lost First round series, 1–2 (North Dakota)	
2008–09	WCHA	28	2	19	7	–	–	–	11	10th	38	6	25	7	.250	Lost First round series, 0–2 (North Dakota)	
2009–10	WCHA	28	4	24	0	–	–	–	8	10th	36	5	30	1	.153	Lost First round series, 0–2 (Denver)	
2010–11	WCHA	28	2	24	2	–	–	–	6	12th	38	4	30	4	.158	Lost First round series, 0–2 (North Dakota)	
Mel Pearson (2011–2017)
2011–12	WCHA	28	11	13	4	–	–	–	26	8th	39	16	19	4	.462	Won First round series, 2–0 (Colorado College); Lost Quarterfinal, 2–3 (OT) (Denver)	
2012–13	WCHA	28	8	16	4	–	–	–	20	10th	37	13	20	4	.405	Lost First round series, 1–2 (North Dakota)	
2013–14	WCHA	28	12	11	5	–	–	–	29	5th	40	14	19	7	.438	Lost First round series, 0–2 (Bowling Green)	
2014–15	WCHA	28	21	5	2	–	–	–	44	2nd	41	29	10	2	.732	Won First round series, 2–0 (Alabama–Huntsville); Won Semifinal, 5–2 (Bowling Green); Lost Championship, 2–5 (Minnesota State)	Lost Regional semifinal, 2–3 (OT) (St. Cloud State)
2015–16	WCHA	28	18	7	3	–	–	–	39	T–1st	37	23	9	5	.689	Won First round series, 2–0 (Alaska); Lost Semifinal, 0–1 (Ferris State)	
2016–17	WCHA	28	15	7	6	–	–	3	54	2nd	45	23	15	7	.589	Won First round series, 2–0 (Lake Superior State); Won Semifinal series, 2–1 (Minnesota State); Won Championship, 3–2 (2OT) (Bowling Green)	Lost Regional semifinal, 2–5 (Denver)
Joe Shawhan (2017–2025)
2017–18	WCHA	28	12	11	5	–	–	2	43	5th	44	22	17	5	.557	Won First round series, 2–0 (Bemidji State); Won Semifinal series, 2–1 (Minnesota State); Won Championship, 2–0 (Northern Michigan)	Lost Regional semifinal, 3–4 (OT) (Notre Dame)
2018–19	WCHA	28	13	12	3	–	–	1	43	6th	38	14	20	4	.421	Lost First round series, 0–2 (Bowling Green)	
2019–20	WCHA	28	14	12	2	–	–	0	44	6th	39	21	15	3	.577	Won Quarterfinal series, 2–0 (Northern Michigan); Tournament Cancelled	
2020–21	WCHA	14	7	7	0	1	0	0	20	T–5th	30	17	12	1	.583	Lost Quarterfinal series, 0–2 (Bemidji State)	
2021–22	CCHA	26	16	8	2	2	4	0	54	2nd	37	21	13	3	.608	Won Quarterfinal series, 2–0 (Ferris State); Lost Semifinal, 2–5 (Bemidji State)	Lost Regional semifinal, 0–3 (Minnesota Duluth)
2022–23	CCHA	26	15	7	4	0	1	0	50	2nd	39	24	11	4	.667	Won Quarterfinal series, 2–0 (St. Thomas); Lost Semifinal, 0–4 (Northern Michigan)	Lost Regional semifinal, 0–8 (Penn State)
2023–24	CCHA	26	12	10	2	1	2	0	39	T–2nd	40	19	15	6	.550	Won Quarterfinal series, 2–0 (Bowling Green); Won Semifinal, 4–3 (Minnesota State); Won Championship, 2–1 (Bemidji State)	Lost Regional semifinal, 1–6 (Boston College)
2024–25	CCHA	26	12	11	3	1	1	1	.513	5th	36	16	17	3	.486	Lost Quarterfinal series, 0–2 (Bowling Green)	
Bill Muckalt (2025–Present)
2025–26	CCHA	26	16	7	3	3	1	0	49	T–4th	39	23	13	3	.628	Won Quarterfinal series, 2–0 (Bowling Green); Lost Semifinal, 2–7 (Minnesota State)	
Totals											GP	W	L	T	%	Championships	
Regular Season											2899	1303	1388	208	.485	7 MCHA / WIHL / WCHA Championships	
Conference Post-season											180	76	97	7	.439	11 WCHA tournament championships, 1 CCHA championship	
NCAA Post-season											28	13	15	0	.464	16 NCAA Tournament appearances	
Regular Season and Post-season Record											3107	1392	1500	215	.483	3 NCAA Division I National Championships	

* Winning percentage is used when conference schedules are unbalanced.
† Tim Watters was fired in November 2000 after a 1–7–1 start.
