= 1961–62 Michigan Tech Huskies men's ice hockey season =

National champion WCHA, champion WCHA Tournament, champion 1962 NCAA Tournament, champion
- Conference: 1st WCHA
- Home ice: Dee Stadium

Record
- Overall: 29–3–0
- Conference: 17–3–0
- Home: 15–1–0
- Road: 10–2–0
- Neutral: 4–0–0

Coaches and captains
- Head coach: John MacInnes
- Assistant coaches: Bill Lucier
- Captain: Jerry Sullivan
- Alternate captain(s): Elov Seger; Henry Åkervall

The 1961–62 Michigan Tech Huskies men's ice hockey team represented Michigan Tech University in college ice hockey. In its 6th year under head coach John MacInnes the team compiled a 29–3–0 record and reached the NCAA tournament for the third time in its history. The Huskies defeated Clarkson 7–1 in the championship game at the Utica Memorial Auditorium in Utica, New York.

== Season ==
After barely losing to Denver in the 1960 championship game, Michigan Tech took a step back in 1960–61, barely finishing above .500 and being embarrassed by the Pioneers in the WCHA tournament. The start of the 1961–62 campaign didn't fare much better as the Huskies dropped both games at Michigan, with each sophomore goaltender losing their first career start. The team then had to head home to welcome the defending national champions but, fortunately for MTU, Denver had lost many players to graduation over the summer and was not nearly as strong. They were still good enough to put up 7 goals in the first game against Tech but the Huskies were able to post 8 of their own and get their first win of the season. That victory seemed to settle Michigan Tech because in the following game they were able to handle the Pioneers and win in a much more convincing fashion, 8–2.

Michigan Tech would host Toronto before the winter break then head to Colorado for a tough series against Denver and Colorado College where they would play 4 games in 5 days. Tech opened with two wins at CC (who would finish the season without a single victory) and after a comfortable 8–4 win in the first game at Denver they scratched out a 5–4 win in overtime to build their record to 8–2. Tech had a short three-day break that allowed them to head home where they would host first-place Michigan. The Huskies handed UM their first loss of the season with 4–2 victory, and just when it looked like Tech could pull into the lead, the Wolverines returned the favor with their own 4–2 win in the second game. This not only dropped MTU to 7-3 in the conference, but, with no further games against the powerful Wolverines, MTU would need help to finish atop the WCHA.

With little time to lick their wounds, the Huskies hit the road and played series against Minnesota and North Dakota. After taking both games against the Golden Gophers they played a pair of nail-biters in Grand Forks, winning the first game 2–1 and escaping with a second win after a 3–2 finish in overtime. Tech started a long home stand by hosting a relatively poor Minnesota–Duluth squad before welcoming North Dakota, Michigan State and Minnesota in consecutive weeks. The Huskies miraculously swept all four weekends and with Michigan having lost twice to Denver in early February, MTU held onto first place and finished with a 17-3 record to earn their first conference championship.

Even though they had won the WCHA Michigan Tech still had games to play on their schedule, and after spending a weekend in Duluth and winning two more games against the Bulldogs, Tech played host to the Finnish National Team and won a further two games to push their record to 25–3, setting a new program record for wins.

As a result of the NCAA having placed both WCHA teams in the same semifinal the year before (due to Denver and Minnesota not having played one another prior to the NCAA tournament) the WCHA changed their playoff format where they dispensed with the pair of two-game series to declare co-champions and went with a more traditional 4-team single-elimination format where a single champion would be crowned. Additionally, rather than play the games at the home cite of the higher-seeded school, all games would be played at a host venue with the Weinberg Coliseum chosen for the 1962 tournament. The Huskies opened against Michigan State and took the game against the Spartans 5–1 which sent them to a fifth meeting with Michigan, the only team that had been able to defeat MTU all season. Michigan opened the scoring just before the half-way point of the first and added a second goal just over two minutes later, both power play goals. As thing were beginning to look bleak for the Huskies their own power play finally scored with less than 30 seconds left in the period and team captain Jerry Sullivan tied the score with 1 second remaining. Tech could have used the timely goals to jump on the Wolverines in the second but Dave Butts held them off the scoresheet and allowed the WCHA leading scorer and player of the year Red Berenson to give Michigan its second lead of the night with UM's third power play marker. With little to lose Tech came out firing in the third and scored two goals in 17 seconds at the start of the period to take their first lead. Michigan tied the game at 4-all with under 9 minutes to play but Lou Angotti got the game-winner 72 seconds later and Garry Bauman held the fort to earn the Huskies the first solitary WCHA tournament championship. The six goals scored by Michigan Tech were the most allowed by Michigan all season.

Michigan Tech received the top western seed due to their conference championship and opened against ECAC champion St. Lawrence who were making their fourth consecutive tournament appearance and 7th overall but had yet to win a single game against any western school. St. Lawrence opened the scoring with a power play goal in the 11th minute but from then-on it was all Michigan Tech. Don Hermanson scored a pair of goals on the man-advantage and was followed by four more from different teammates while the Huskies outshot the Larries 55–15 and easily marched to their third championship game.

It had thought that MTU could meet Michigan for a sixth time in the championship game but the Wolverines had been dispatched by Clarkson in the semifinal and the Golden Knights were all that stood in Tech way for the first national title. The game couldn't have started better for the Huskies when John Ivanitz scored 38 seconds in and added another five minutes later. Sullivan scored before 10 minutes had elapsed in the game and with an early 3-0 lead MTU was off and running. Unlike St. Lawrence, Clarkson didn't wilt under the bright lights and the Golden Knights continued firing the puck, finally scoring in the final minute of the first to cut the lead to 2. Both teams were held scoreless in the second as Bauman and his counterpart Wayne Gibbons held off separate barrages but Clarkson broke down in the third and allowed four more goals, with Ivanitz completing his hat-trick and Sullivan earning his fourth point of the night before Lou Angotti added a pair of insurance markers.

Angotti was named as tournament MOP, becoming the first player to win the award twice and the only one to do so on both the winning and losing team in the national championship. Angotti, along with Ivanitz, Elov Seger and Henry Åkervall were named to the All-Tournament first team while, despite their stellar play, Bauman and Sullivan were named to the second team. John Ivanitz is one of only two players in history to record a hat trick, including the game-winner, and not be named as tournament MOP (as of 2018).

After the season Åkervall, Angotti, Seger and Sullivan were named to the AHCA All-American West Team while Åkervall, Angotti, Bauman and Sullivan found themselves on the All-WCHA First Team. Seger and Gene Rebellato were also named to the WCHA second team while head coach John MacInnes earned his second WCHA Coach of the Year award.

Michigan Tech ended the season on a 20-game winning streak. They would extend that to 22 game at the start of the following season, the longest such streak in program history.

== Standings ==
1961–62 Western Collegiate Hockey Association standings
	Conference							Overall					
	GP	W	L	T	PCT	GF	GA	GP	W	L	T	GF	GA
Michigan Tech†*	20	17	3	0	.850	101	58	32	29	3	0	188	80
Michigan	18	15	3	0	.833	95	48	27	22	5	0	150	76
Denver	18	11	7	0	.611	83	71	30	17	11	2	144	111
Michigan State	16	6	9	1	.406	57	71	25	13	11	1	98	94
North Dakota	18	7	11	0	.389	62	71	26	9	17	0	96	123
Minnesota	16	5	10	1	.344	69	61	21	9	10	2	95	73
Colorado College	18	0	18	0	.000	56	143	23	0	23	0	74	181
Championship: Michigan Tech † indicates conference regular season champion * indicates conference tournament champion

== Schedule ==
Date	Opponent	Site	Result	Record
Regular Season
December 1	at Michigan	Weinberg Coliseum • Ann Arbor, Michigan	L 1–3	0–1 (0–1)
December 2	at Michigan	Weinberg Coliseum • Ann Arbor, Michigan	L 3–5	0–2 (0–2)
December 8	vs. Denver	Dee Stadium • Houghton, Michigan	W 8–7	1–2 (1–2)
December 9	vs. Denver	Dee Stadium • Houghton, Michigan	W 8–2	2–2 (2–2)
December 15	vs. Toronto*	Dee Stadium • Houghton, Michigan	W 4–1	3–2 (2–2)
December 16	vs. Toronto*	Dee Stadium • Houghton, Michigan	W 9–1	4–2 (2–2)
December 29	at Colorado College	Broadmoor World Arena • Colorado Springs, Colorado	W 7–4	5–2 (3–2)
December 30	at Colorado College	Broadmoor World Arena • Colorado Springs, Colorado	W 9–4	6–2 (4–2)
January 1	at Denver	DU Arena • Denver, Colorado	W 8–4	7–2 (5–2)
January 2	at Denver	DU Arena • Denver, Colorado	W 5–4 ^{OT}	8–2 (6–2)
January 5	vs. Michigan	Dee Stadium • Houghton, Michigan	W 4–2	9–2 (7–2)
January 6	vs. Michigan	Dee Stadium • Houghton, Michigan	L 2–4	9–3 (7–3)
January 12	vs. Minnesota	Williams Arena • Minneapolis, Minnesota	W 5–1	10–3 (8–3)
January 13	vs. Minnesota	Williams Arena • Minneapolis, Minnesota	W 4–2	11–3 (9–3)
January 19	at North Dakota	Winter Sports Building • Grand Forks, North Dakota	W 2–1	12–3 (10–3)
January 20	at North Dakota	Winter Sports Building • Grand Forks, North Dakota	W 3–2 ^{OT}	13–3 (11–3)
January 26	vs. Minnesota–Duluth*	Dee Stadium • Houghton, Michigan	W 7–1	14–3 (11–3)
January 27	vs. Minnesota–Duluth*	Dee Stadium • Houghton, Michigan	W 4–2	15–3 (11–3)
February 2	vs. North Dakota	Dee Stadium • Houghton, Michigan	W 6–2	16–3 (12–3)
February 3	vs. North Dakota	Dee Stadium • Houghton, Michigan	W 6–2	17–3 (13–3)
February 9	vs. Michigan State	Dee Stadium • Houghton, Michigan (Winter Carnival)	W 8–2	18–3 (14–3)
February 10	vs. Michigan State	Dee Stadium • Houghton, Michigan (Winter Carnival)	W 3–2 ^{OT}	19–3 (15–3)
February 16	vs. Minnesota	Dee Stadium • Houghton, Michigan	W 6–3	20–3 (16–3)
February 17	vs. Minnesota	Dee Stadium • Houghton, Michigan	W 3–2 ^{OT}	21–3 (17–3)
February 23	at Minnesota–Duluth*	Duluth Curling and Skating Club • Duluth, Minnesota	W 12–2	22–3 (17–3)
February 24	at Minnesota–Duluth*	Duluth Curling and Skating Club • Duluth, Minnesota	W 5–2	23–3 (17–3)
February 26	vs. Finnish National Team*	Dee Stadium • Houghton, Michigan	W 7–3	24–3 (17–3)
February 27	vs. Finnish National Team*	Dee Stadium • Houghton, Michigan	W 15–2	25–3 (17–3)
WCHA Tournament
March 1	vs. Michigan State*	Weinberg Coliseum • Ann Arbor, Michigan (WCHA Semifinal)	W 5–1	26–3 (17–3)
March 3	vs. Michigan*	Weinberg Coliseum • Ann Arbor, Michigan (WCHA championship)	W 6–4	27–3 (17–3)
NCAA Tournament
March 16	vs. St. Lawrence*	Utica Memorial Auditorium • Utica, New York (National Semifinal)	W 6–1	28–3 (17–3)
March 17	vs. Clarkson*	Utica Memorial Auditorium • Utica, New York (National championship)	W 7–1	29–3 (17–3)
*Non-conference game. Source:

== Roster and scoring statistics ==
No.	Name	Year	Position	Hometown	S/P/C	Games	Goals	Assists	Points	PIM
8	Jerry Sullivan	Senior	C	Noranda, PQ	(Quebec)	32	30	29	59	6
15	Lou Angotti	Senior	C	Toronto, ON	(Ontario)	31	28	23	51	50
10	Gene Rebellato	Sophomore	LW	Sault Ste. Marie, ON	(Ontario)	31	18	31	49	10
9	John Ivanitz	Junior	F	Regina, SK	(Saskatchewan)	32	20	26	46	2
11	Gary Begg	Junior	C	Moosomin, SK	(Saskatchewan)	31	12	23	35	47
16	Pat Casey	Junior	F	Kirkland Lake, ON	(Ontario)	31	12	17	29	33
7	Mike Draper	Junior	LW	Ottawa, ON	(Ontario)	31	19	7	26	49
14	Barry Johnson	Junior	F	Toronto, ON	(Ontario)	31	10	13	23	8
2	Al Merlo	Senior	D	Trail, BC	(British Columbia)	32	7	16	23	32
3	Bob Pallante	Sophomore	D	Toronto, ON	(Ontario)	31	2	21	23	54
6	Henry Åkervall	Senior	D/W	Port Arthur, ON	(Ontario)	30	4	14	18	20
5	Elov Seger	Senior	D	Fort Frances, ON	(Ontario)	32	3	12	15	14
20	Don Hermanson	Senior	C	Hancock, MI	(Michigan)	30	7	6	13	6
12	Scott Watson	Sophomore	F	Wood Mountain, SK	(Saskatchewan)	26	8	4	12	18
19	Bob Mikesch	Sophomore	F	Hancock, MI	(Michigan)	7	4	5	9	2
2	Norman Wimmer	Sophomore	D	Montreal, PQ	(Quebec)	30	0	6	6	28
18	Al Patterson	Sophomore	D	Kimberley, BC	(British Columbia)	7	2	3	5	0
17	Gary MacLellan	Sophomore	F	Calgary, AB	(Alberta)	9	0	1	1	2
1	Garry Bauman	Sophomore	G	Innisfail, AB	(Alberta)	25	0	0	0	0
1	Phil McVittie	Sophomore	G	Weston, ON	(Ontario)	7	0	0	0	0
Total							186	257	443	381

== Goaltending Statistics ==
No.	Name	Games	Minutes	Wins	Losses	Ties	Goals Against	Saves	Shut Outs	SV %	GAA
1	Garry Bauman	25	1500	23	2	0	61	595	0	.907	2.44
1	Phil McVittie	7	–	6	1	0	–	–	0	.902	2.70
Total		32	–	29	3	0	80	–	0	–	–

== 1962 championship game ==
=== E1 Clarkson vs. W1 Michigan Tech ===
March 17	Clarkson	1 – 7	Michigan Tech	Utica Memorial Auditorium

Scoring summary
Period	Team	Goal	Assist(s)	Time	Score
1st	MTU	John Ivanitz	unassisted	0:38	1–0 MTU
1st	MTU	John Ivanitz – GW	Sullivan	5:38	2–0 MTU
1st	MTU	Jerry Sullivan	Merlo and Rebellato	9:26	3–0 MTU
1st	CLK	Joseph LaPointe – PP	Pettersen	19:42	3–1 MTU
2nd	None				
3rd	MTU	Jerry Sullivan	Ivanitz and Rebellato	40:38	4–1 MTU
3rd	MTU	John Ivanitz	Sullivan and Rebellato	44:53	5–1 MTU
3rd	MTU	Lou Angotti	unassisted	46:14	6–1 MTU
3rd	MTU	Lou Angotti	unassisted	59:20	7–1 MTU
Penalty summary
Period	Team	Player	Penalty	Time	PIM
1st	CLK	Robert Taylor	Illegal Check	9:40	2:00
1st	MTU	Bob Pallante	Elbowing	13:33	2:00
1st	MTU	Bob Pallante	Interference	18:35	2:00
2nd	CLK	Corby Adams	Illegal Check	21:32	2:00
2nd	MTU	Albert Merlo	Slashing	26:56	2:00
2nd	MTU	Norman Wimmer	Elbowing	30:12	2:00
2nd	MTU	Henry Akervall	Interference	32:04	2:00
3rd	MTU	Elov Seger	Boarding	49:05	2:00
3rd	MTU	Bob Pallante	Spearing	50:52	2:00
3rd	MTU	Gene Rebellato	Holding	56:55	2:00
3rd	MTU	Bob Pallante	Holding	58:10	2:00
3rd	CLK	Frank Schmeler	Tripping	58:17	2:00

Shots by period
Team	1	2	3	T
Clarkson	12	13	15	40
Michigan Tech	12	16	16	44

Goaltenders
Team	Name	Saves	Goals against	Time on ice
CLK	Wayne Gibbons	37	7	
MTU	Garry Bauman	39	1	
