= 1962 WCHA men's ice hockey tournament =

1962 WCHA Men's ice hockey tournament
- Dates: March 1–3, 1962
- Teams: 4
- Finals site: Weinberg Coliseum; Ann Arbor, Michigan
- Champions: Michigan Tech (2nd title)
- Winning coach: John MacInnes (2nd title)
- WCHA Men's Ice Hockey Tournaments

The 1962 WCHA Men's Ice Hockey Tournament was the 3rd conference playoff in league history. The tournament was played between March 1 and March 3, 1962. All games were played at the Weinberg Coliseum in Ann Arbor, Michigan. By reaching the title game both Michigan Tech and Michigan were invited to participate in the 1962 NCAA Division I Men's Ice Hockey Tournament.

== Format ==
The top four teams in the WCHA, based upon the conference regular season standings, were eligible for the tournament and were seeded No. 1 through No. 4. The entire tournament consisted of single-elimination games. In the first round the first and fourth seeds and the second and third seeds were matched with winners advanced to the championship game and the losers playing in a third-place game.

=== Conference standings ===
Note: GP = Games played; W = Wins; L = Losses; T = Ties; PCT = Winning percentage; GF = Goals for; GA = Goals against

1961–62 Western Collegiate Hockey Association standings
	Conference							Overall					
	GP	W	L	T	PCT	GF	GA	GP	W	L	T	GF	GA
Michigan Tech†*	20	17	3	0	.850	101	58	32	29	3	0	188	80
Michigan	18	15	3	0	.833	95	48	27	22	5	0	150	76
Denver	18	11	7	0	.611	83	71	30	17	11	2	144	111
Michigan State	16	6	9	1	.406	57	71	25	13	11	1	98	94
North Dakota	18	7	11	0	.389	62	71	26	9	17	0	96	123
Minnesota	16	5	10	1	.344	69	61	21	9	10	2	95	73
Colorado College	18	0	18	0	.000	56	143	23	0	23	0	74	181
Championship: Michigan Tech † indicates conference regular season champion * indicates conference tournament champion

== Bracket ==
First round
1	Michigan Tech	5
4	Michigan State	1
2	Michigan	8
3	Denver	4

Championship
1	Michigan Tech	6
2	Michigan	4
Third-place game
3	Denver	3
4	Michigan State	4

Note: * denotes overtime period(s)

=== Semifinals ===
==== (1) Michigan Tech vs. (4) Michigan State ====
March 1	Michigan Tech	5 – 1	Michigan State	Weinberg Coliseum

==== (2) Michigan vs. (3) Denver ====
March 2	Michigan	8 – 4	Denver	Weinberg Coliseum

=== Third-place game ===
==== (1) Denver vs. (2) Michigan State ====
March 3	Denver	3 – 4	Michigan State	Weinberg Coliseum

=== Championship Game ===
==== (1) Michigan Tech vs. (2) Michigan ====
March 3	Michigan Tech	6 – 4	Michigan	Weinberg Coliseum
(Akervall) John Ivanitz - PP - 19:37 (Rebellato) Jerry Sullivan - 19:59		First period	09:32 - PP - Jerry Kolb (Coristine); 11:39 - PP - Don Rodgers (Kelly, Hinnegan)
No scoring		Second period	08:05 - PP - Red Berenson (Kolb, Coristine)
(unassisted) Elov Seger - 02:00 (Begg) Scott Watson - 02:17 (unassisted) Lou Angotti - GW - 12:35 (Angotti) Mike Draper - 14:19		Third period	11:23 - Ron Coristine (Berenson, Kartusch)
Garry Bauman (29 saves / 33 shots)		Goalie stats	Dave Butts (30 saves / 36 shots)

== Tournament awards ==
None

== See also ==
- Western Collegiate Hockey Association men's champions
