= Herb Boxer =

American ice hockey player (born 1947)

- Born: June 4, 1947 (age 79) Hancock, Michigan, U.S.
- Height: 5 ft 8 in (173 cm)
- Weight: 170 lb (77 kg; 12 st 2 lb)
- Position: Right wing
- Shot: Right
- Played for: Fort Worth Wings; Virginia Wings; Kalamazoo Wings; Green Bay Bobcats
- National team: United States
- NHL draft: 17th overall, 1968; Detroit Red Wings
- Playing career: 1970–1975
- Coaching career

Biographical details
- Education: Michigan Tech University

Playing career
- 1967–1970: Michigan Tech

Coaching career (HC unless noted)
- 1976–1985: Michigan Tech (Assistant)
- 1977–1979: US WJC (Assistant)
- 1985–1990: Michigan Tech
- 1994–1998: Memphis River Kings

Head coaching record
- Overall: 66–129–8 (.345) [College]

Accomplishments and honors

Awards
- 1988 WCHA Coach of the Year

Herb Boxer (born June 4, 1947) is an American retired ice hockey winger. Boxer was the first U.S.-born player drafted to the NHL, when he was drafted in the second round (17th overall) by the Detroit Red Wings in the 1968 NHL draft.

== Professional career ==
=== College hockey ===
Boxer started college in Houghton, Michigan at Michigan Technological University in 1966. He had played hockey in high school and tried out for the team. His freshman year was spent on the junior team, but Boxer showed enough of his skill to make the varsity squad for his sophomore season. Playing on lines with Al Karlander and Brian Watts, Boxer amassed 24 points in the 31-game season. But he also did much more, showing his speed and skill with the puck. Focusing on his studies toward the end of the season, Boxer had no idea that anyone else had even taken notice of his abilities.

"I remember it because it was the end of my sophomore season at Michigan Tech University, I was just finishing up final exams. I walked over to the athletic department just to check on something, I really don’t remember what it was. I ran into member of the hockey coaching staff. My coach, John MacInnes, told me that he had talked to the Detroit Red Wings the day before and said that they were interested in me. He told me that there was a good chance that I might be drafted the next day. But don’t count on it because so many other things can happen. I think this was on a Friday."

On June 13, 1968, the sixth NHL Draft took place at the Queen Elizabeth Hotel in Montreal, and Herb Boxer's name was announced as the 17th player taken overall, by the Detroit Red Wings. Boxer was the first American-born player selected in the NHL draft.

"The next day I woke up and planned on meeting some of my friends down at a local restaurant. I walked into the restaurant and I heard somebody say; 'Hey Herb, I heard you got drafted.' The person informed me that I had been drafted by Detroit. That was how I found out. There were no phone calls by Detroit. The media wasn't covering it like they do today. Even the university didn't cover it or announce it. I knew that I would be in college for another two years so I really took everything pretty casual. But my future wife, that was another story. She thought I had been drafted. But not by the Red Wings, but by the United States Army. The Vietnam War was in full swing at the time. The U.S. Military had a draft at the time. Thousands of young men were being drafted by the military. So many who heard I had been drafted thought I was on my way to Vietnam."

Boxer played two more seasons for Michigan Tech and led the team in goal scoring during the 1969–70 season, finishing with 24 goals and 14 assists. He decided to sign with the Red Wings after graduation, among other offers for his services.

"It was 1970 and the US team was holding their training camp, I had a good training camp with them. So what ended up happening was that I had two different hockey organizations wanting my services at the time. There were some good players on the Olympic Team at the time including Henry Boucha, Robbie Ftorek and Mark Howe. I would have loved to have played with them. But Detroit made me an offer and I decided to go with them."

Detroit offered Boxer a US$8,000 salary to go along with a US$7,000 signing bonus.

=== Minor league hockey ===
After graduation, Boxer started play with the Fort Worth Wings of the Central Hockey League, reuniting with former teammate Al Karlander. Boxer had a slow start, scoring 17 points in his first season with the Wings, but turning it around with a strong second season. For the 1971–72 season, Boxer finished fourth on the team in scoring with 23 goals and 28 assists. He even tacked on six points in Fort Worth's short playoff run. After his first season in Fort Worth, Boxer was drafted again, this time by the U.S. Army; however he wouldn't end up serving.

"I was classified 1-A before I turned pro. I suffered a back injury that first season in the minors. By the time I was drafted, I went for my physical and failed it. I was classified 4-F. That back injury made the difference."

Soon after, Boxer was moved to another minor league affiliate when he joined the Virginia Wings of the American Hockey League for the 1972–73 season. Boxer continued his great offensive play, scoring 54 points and even helped carry Virginia into the playoffs, losing in the semi-finals to the eventual Calder Cup champions, the Cincinnati Swords. The following season saw more of the same as Boxer finished fifth on his team in scoring with 40 points.

Let go by Virginia after the end of the season, Boxer found a short home with the Green Bay Bobcats of the United States Hockey League. He only played a handful of games before heading to Kalamazoo, Michigan to play for the Kalamazoo Wings of the International Hockey League. After finishing out the season with Kalamazoo, Boxer was asked to represent the United States in the 1975 World Championship in West Germany. He was released from his contract in February and joined the team, where he was quickly named their Captain.

"Bob Johnson was the coach of that team. I got to play with the team for their final six weeks. I figured that this was a great way to end my hockey playing career. I had had a good career. I ended up getting an offer to play in Sweden the following season, but I had enough and was ready to start the next part of my life."

The U.S. team took sixth place in the tournament and Boxer retired from playing ice hockey in 1975.

=== Boxer the coach ===
After the World Championships, Boxer found a job as a hockey program director for a small place in Rockford, Illinois. He enjoyed the work and in 1976 accepted the position of assistant coach at his alma mater, under his former coach MacInnes. He remained assistant coach for nine years under MacInnes and Jim Nahrgang until Nahrgang resigned in February 1985 and Boxer was promoted to head coach of the Huskies. During that time, Boxer also coached with the U.S. Junior National Team in 1978 and 1979. In his first season as head coach, Boxer coached the Huskies to a losing record of 10-26-4. His second season saw more of the same with a 15-24-1 record. However in the 1987–88 season, Boxer coached the Huskies to a 20-20-1 record and was named WCHA Coach of the Year. After their first season without a losing record, the Huskies returned to their losing ways for the next two seasons and Boxer was let go after the 1989–90 season.

Boxer wouldn't return to coaching until 1994 when he stepped in to help the struggling Memphis RiverKings of the Central Hockey League. Boxer helped turn the team around and make the playoffs twice in his three full seasons with the team. The RiverKings even made it to the finals in the 1996–97 season. However, Boxer was let go the following season after coaching the RiverKings to a 9-23-0 record midway through the season. Boxer decided to retire from coaching.

== Life after hockey ==
Boxer is currently Retired in Colorado Springs, after his successful hockey career. He is also the father of Marc Boxer and Jay Boxer, both of whom played college hockey. Boxer is proud of both his hometown and the impact he has had on American born players in the NHL, as told in an interview on NHL.com;

"I come from the twin-city area of Houghton and Hancock, Michigan. It’s located on a beautiful spot on Lake Superior. They say that’s where hockey was born in the United States. Cyclone Taylor played there in the early days of pro hockey. It has quite a history of hockey. Today, all the youngsters up there, both boys and girls, play hockey. Amateur hockey up there is pretty big as it is around other parts of the United States."

When asked about what a player should do to make it to the NHL today, Boxer had this to say;

"Today I would tell a kid to listen to their parents and listen to their coaches. Ask a lot of questions of the better players. Learn from their mistakes. Your best friends will be your coaches and your parents. They will help you along the way. With the impact the Americans have made in hockey, it speaks volumes on how far USA Hockey has come as well. Americans are competing on a level equal to the rest of the world. There is no doubt any more that Americans are leaving their mark on the world of hockey."

== Head coaching record ==
=== College ===
Record table
Season	Team	Overall	Conference	Standing	Postseason
Michigan Tech Huskies (WCHA) (1985–1990)
1985–86	Michigan Tech	10–26–4	9–22–3	8th	WCHA First Round
1986–87	Michigan Tech	11–28–1	11–23–1	t-7th	WCHA First Round
1987–88	Michigan Tech	20–20–1	19–15–1	4th	WCHA First Round
1988–89	Michigan Tech	15–25–2	15–19–1	6th	WCHA First Round
1989–90	Michigan Tech	10–30–0	6–22–0	8th	WCHA First Round
Michigan Tech:		66–129–8	60–101–6		
Total:		66–129–8			
National champion Postseason invitational champion Conference regular season champion Conference regular season and conference tournament champion Division regular season champion Division regular season and conference tournament champion Conference tournament champion

== Awards and achievements ==
- Named Captain of Team USA at the 1975 World Ice Hockey Championship
- WCHA Coach of the Year: 1987–88 (Michigan Tech)

Awards and achievements
Preceded by John Gasparini	WCHA Coach of the Year; 1987–88	Succeeded by Rick Comley
