= Michigan Tech Huskies men's ice hockey =

College ice hockey program

- Current season
- University: Michigan Technological University
- Conference: CCHA
- Head coach: Bill Muckalt; 2nd season, 23–13–3 (.628)
- Assistant coaches: Benton Maass; L.J. Scarpace; Tyler Shelast
- Arena: MacInnes Student Ice Arena; Houghton, Michigan
- Student section: Mitch's Misfits
- Colors: Black and gold
- Mascot: Blizzard T. Husky

NCAA tournament champions
- 1962, 1965, 1975

NCAA tournament runner-up
- 1956, 1960, 1974, 1976

NCAA tournament Frozen Four
- 1956, 1960, 1962, 1965, 1969, 1970, 1974, 1975, 1976, 1981

NCAA tournament appearances
- 1956, 1960, 1962, 1965, 1969, 1970, 1974, 1975, 1976, 1981, 2015, 2017, 2018, 2022, 2023, 2024

Conference tournament champions
- WCHA: 1960, 1962, 1965, 1969, 1970, 1974, 1975, 1976, 1981, 2017, 2018; CCHA: 2024

Conference regular season champions
- WCHA: 1962, 1966, 1969, 1971, 1974, 1976, 2016

Current uniform

The Michigan Tech Huskies men's ice hockey team is an NCAA Division I college ice hockey program that represents Michigan Technological University. The Huskies are a member of the Central Collegiate Hockey Association (CCHA). They play at the MacInnes Student Ice Arena in Houghton, Michigan.

The Huskies host and compete in the annual Great Lakes Invitational held in December of each year. The four-team tournament was played for the 50th year in 2014.

== History ==
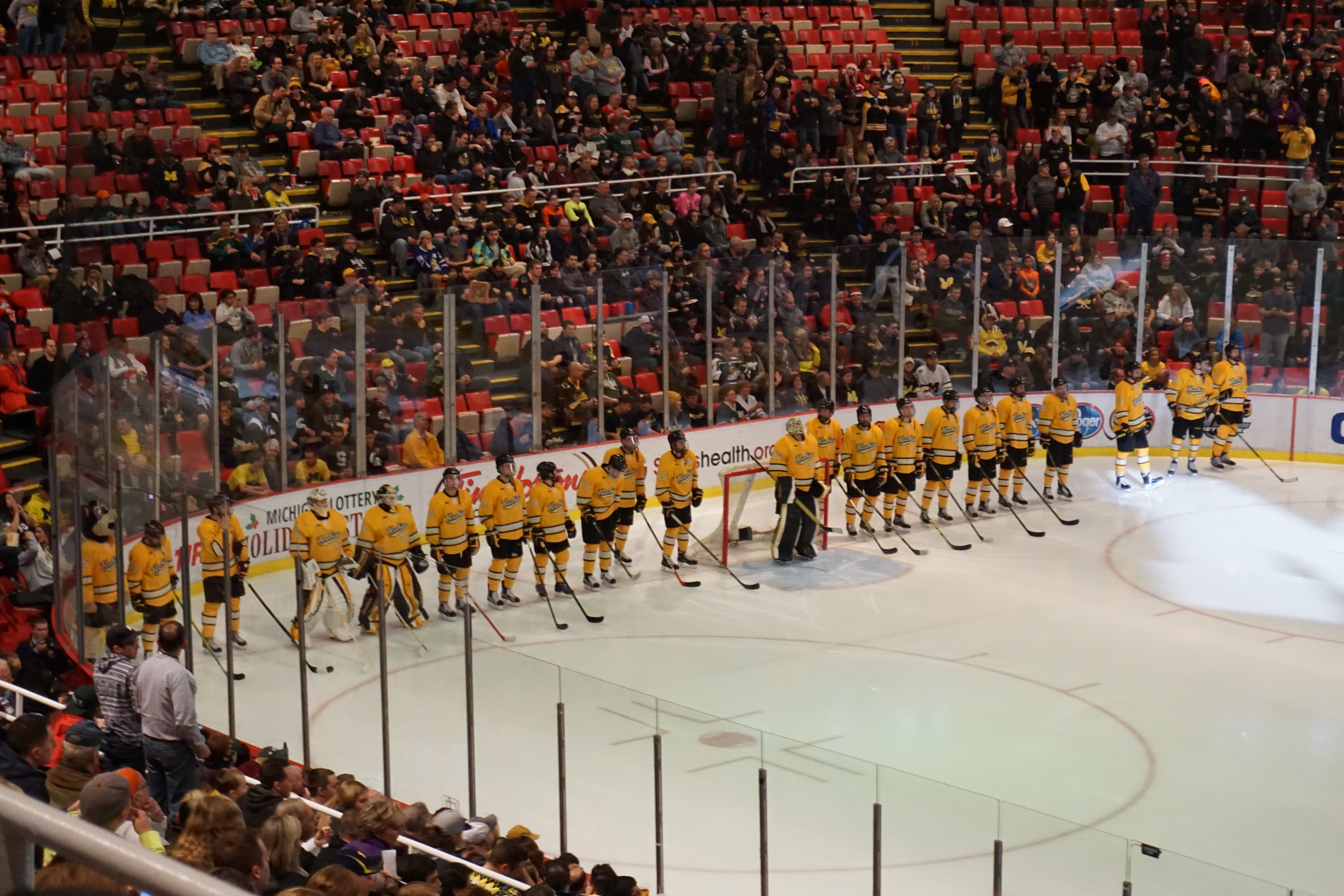
The Michigan Tech Huskies at the 2015 Great Lakes Invitational

Michigan Tech has had a storied history from its inception in 1919, producing three national championships. The program has played in five different home arenas including the Amphidrome, Calumet Colosseum, Dee Stadium and the MacInnes Student Ice Arena.

The program is a charter member of the WCHA in 1951 and became a national powerhouse under the leadership of Coach John MacInnes during the 1960s, 1970s, and early 1980s.

The team has won three NCAA Division I championships (1962, 1965, and 1975) and seven Western Collegiate Hockey Association championships (1962, 1965, 1969, 1971, 1974, 1976, and 2016).

=== Conferences ===
- None (1919–51, 1958–59)
- Midwest Collegiate Hockey League/
  Western Intercollegiate Hockey League/
  Western Collegiate Hockey Association (1951–58, 1959–81, 1984–2021)
- Central Collegiate Hockey Association (1981–84, 2021–present)

=== NCAA Championships ===
Year	Champion	Score	Runner-up	City	Arena
1962	Michigan Tech	7–1	Clarkson	Utica, NY	Utica Memorial Auditorium
1965	Michigan Tech	8–2	Boston College	Providence, RI	Meehan Auditorium
1975	Michigan Tech	6–1	Minnesota	St. Louis, MO	St. Louis Arena

== Season-by-season results ==
Source:

== Coaches ==
As of the completion of the 2025–26 season.

Tenure	Coach	Years	Record	Pct.
1919–1920	E. R. Lovell	1	1–2–1	.375
1920–1921, 1923–1924	Elmer Sicotte	2	7–9–0	.438
1921–1922	Mike Fay	1	8–3–1	.708
1922–1923	Bill Murdoch	1	0–4–0	.000
1924–1926	Leon Harvey	2	4–6–1	.409
1926–1929	Carlos "Cub" Haug	3	12–10–3	.540
1929–1936	Bert Noblet	7	44–53–8	.457
1936–1938	Joe Savini	2	11–19–4	.382
1938–1941, 1945–1948	Ed Maki*	6	35–60–0	.368
1941–1943	Elwin Romnes	2	4–15–3	.250
1948–1951	Amo Bessone	3	20–31–2	.396
1951–1956	Al Renfrew	5	48–68–2	.415
1956–1982	John MacInnes	26	555–295–39	.646
1982–1985	Jim Nahrgang*	3	56–62–3	.475
1985–1990	Herb Boxer*	5	66–129–8	.345
1990–1992	Newell Brown	2	29–47–4	.388
1992–1996	Bob Mancini	4	63–80–20	.448
1996–2000	Tim Watters†*	5	39–116–9	.265
2000–2003	Mike Sertich	3	25–69–9	.286
2003–2011	Jamie Russell*	8	70–197–37	.291
2011–2017	Mel Pearson*	6	118–92–29	.554
2017–2025	Joe Shawhan	8	154–120–29	.556
2025–present	Bill Muckalt	1	23–13–3	.628
Totals	23 coaches	105 seasons	1392–1500–215	.483

* indicates former Huskies player
† Tim Watters was fired in November 2000 after a 1–7–1 start.

== Pageantry ==
Huskies hockey fans associate many traditional songs with hockey games. Some of these songs include "The Engineer's Song", verses other than the first to "In Heaven There Is No Beer" and "Blue Skirt Waltz" (stylized as "The Copper Country Anthem"). Student organizations associated with hockey fandom include the student fan section Mitch's Misfits, and DaWGs, the official group representing the Huskies Pep Band.

== Arena ==
John J. MacInnes Student Ice Arena: (1972–present)

- Name: Student Ice Arena (1972–91), John J. MacInnes Student Ice Arena (1991–present)
- Capacity: 4,200
- Constructed: 1971
- Dedication and first game: January 14, 1972
- Renovated: 1999, 2009

Top single-game crowds

- 4,619 vs Michigan: February 7, 1976
- 4,563 vs Denver: February 4, 1978
- 4,551 vs Denver: February 3, 1978

Top weekend series crowds

- 9,131 vs Michigan: February 6–7, 1976
- 9,114 vs Denver: February 3–4, 1978
- 8,992 vs Michigan State: February 1–2, 1974

== Statistical leaders ==
=== Career points leaders ===
Player	Years	GP	G	A	Pts	PIM
Mike Zuke	1972–1976	163	133	177	310	
Bob D'Alvise	1971–1975	149	100	117	217	
Stuart Ostlund	1974–1978	160	80	133	213	
John Young	1989–1993	155	61	149	210	
Rick Boehm	1978–1982	147	66	143	209	
Bill Terry	1980–1984	152	91	89	180	
Pat Mikesch	1992–1996	153	57	112	169	
George Lyle	1973–1976	100	93	73	166	
Steve Murphy	1979–1984	144	73	92	165	
Jack McManus	1953–1957	107	88	72	160	

=== Career goaltending leaders ===
GP = Games played; Min = Minutes played; W = Wins; L = Losses; T = Ties; GA = Goals against; SO = Shutouts; SV% = Save percentage; GAA = Goals against average

Minimum 30 games

Player	Years	GP	Min	W	L	T	GA	SO	SV%	GAA
Jamie Phillips	2012–2016	99	5614	57	25	8	187	10	.922	2.00
Blake Pietila	2019–2024	141	8164	76	49	11	288	24	.921	2.12
Tony Esposito	1964–1967	51	3160	38	10	3	130	2	.912	2.55
Garry Bauman	1961–1964	75	4500	52	22	1	198	6	.916	2.64
Michael-Lee Teslak	2005–2008	73	4085	26	33	11	181	5	.910	2.66

Statistics current through the end of the 2023–24 season.

== Current roster ==
As of August 21, 2025.

No.	Nat.	Player	Class	Pos	Height	Weight	DoB	Hometown	Previous team	NHL rights
2	(Finland)	Tom Leppä	Sophomore	F	6' 0" (1.83 m)	183 lb (83 kg)	2005-07-31	Kauniainen, Finland	Fargo Force (USHL)	—
3	(Canada)	Rylan Brown	Sophomore	D	6' 0" (1.83 m)	161 lb (73 kg)	2005-01-23	Sherwood Park, Alberta	Okotoks Oilers (BCHL)	—
4	(United States)	Jack Anderson	Senior	D	6' 6" (1.98 m)	225 lb (102 kg)	2002-11-14	St. Louis, Missouri	Lindenwood (NAHL)	—
5	(United States)	Max Matthews	Freshman	D	6' 1" (1.85 m)	190 lb (86 kg)	2004-02-28	Arlington Heights, Illinois	New Mexico Ice Wolves (NAHL)	—
6	(Canada)	Brayden Boehm	Freshman	F	6' 0" (1.83 m)	187 lb (85 kg)	2004-01-15	Nanaimo, British Columbia	Victoria Royals (WHL)	—
7	(Finland)	Kasper Vähärautio	Senior	D	6' 0" (1.83 m)	187 lb (85 kg)	2002-10-02	Helsinki, Finland	Jokerit U20 (U20 SM-sarja)	—
8	(Canada)	Kalem Parker	Freshman	D	6' 0" (1.83 m)	187 lb (85 kg)	2004-10-12	Clavet, Saskatchewan	Calgary Hitmen (WHL)	MIN, 181st overall 2023
9	(Canada)	Carson Latimer	Sophomore	F	6' 1" (1.85 m)	192 lb (87 kg)	2003-01-10	White Rock, British Columbia	British Columbia (CWUAA)	OTT, 123rd overall 2021
10	(Finland)	Elias Jansson	Sophomore	F	6' 0" (1.83 m)	187 lb (85 kg)	2005-04-13	Oulu, Finland	Oulun Kärpät J20 (U20 SM-sarja)	—
11	(United States)	Owen Baker	Junior	F	5' 10" (1.78 m)	185 lb (84 kg)	2004-01-29	Howell, Michigan	Michigan State (Big Ten)	—
12	(United States)	Ryan Abraham	Freshman	F	5' 8" (1.73 m)	168 lb (76 kg)	2004-04-05	Livonia, Michigan	Windsor Spitfires (OHL)	—
13	(Canada)	Tyler Miller	Sophomore	D	6' 0" (1.83 m)	176 lb (80 kg)	2004-09-16	Medicine Hat, Alberta	Waterloo Black Hawks (USHL)	—
14	(Finland)	Max Koskipirtti	Junior	F	6' 0" (1.83 m)	180 lb (82 kg)	2004-08-16	Espoo, Finland	Kiekko-Espoo U20 (U20 SM-sarja)	—
15	(Canada)	Carson Birnie	Freshman	F	6' 1" (1.85 m)	187 lb (85 kg)	2005-02-22	Arcola, Saskatchewan	Calgary Hitmen (WHL)	—
16	(Canada)	Isaac Gordon	Junior	F	5' 11" (1.8 m)	190 lb (86 kg)	2004-01-29	Landmark, Manitoba	Sioux Falls Stampede (USHL)	—
17	(United States)	Reid Daavettila	Freshman	F	6' 2" (1.88 m)	198 lb (90 kg)	2005-03-04	Howell, Michigan	Waterloo Black Hawks (USHL)	—
18	(Canada)	Noah Reinhart	Freshman	F	6' 1" (1.85 m)	201 lb (91 kg)	2004-05-09	Dundas, Ontario	Val-d'Or Foreurs (QMJHL)	—
19	(Canada)	Michael Cicek	Freshman	F	6' 1" (1.85 m)	190 lb (86 kg)	2004-01-26	Winnipeg, Manitoba	Kelowna Rockets (WHL)	—
20	(United States)	Joe Prouty	Senior	D	6' 0" (1.83 m)	180 lb (82 kg)	2001-11-29	Burnsville, Minnesota	Lindenwood (NCAA)	—
21	(Canada)	Reid Andresen	Freshman	D	5' 9" (1.75 m)	165 lb (75 kg)	2005-04-29	Saskatoon, Saskatchewan	Wenatchee Wild (WHL)	—
22	(Canada)	Matthew Van Blaricom	Freshman	F	5' 11" (1.8 m)	174 lb (79 kg)	2006-08-26	Southey, Saskatchewan	Muskegon Lumberjacks (USHL)	—
23	(United States)	Trevor Kukkonen	Senior	F	5' 11" (1.8 m)	181 lb (82 kg)	2001-02-01	Maple Grove, Minnesota	Minnesota Magicians (NAHL)	—
24	(Canada)	Rylan Gould	Freshman	F	5' 10" (1.78 m)	181 lb (82 kg)	2005-08-05	Headingley, Manitoba	Swift Current Broncos (WHL)	—
25	(United States)	Braden Pietila	Freshman	D	6' 1" (1.85 m)	185 lb (84 kg)	2004-11-25	Howell, Michigan	Odessa Jackalopes (NAHL)	—
26	(Sweden)	Luca Fasciano	Freshman	D	6' 4" (1.93 m)	209 lb (95 kg)	2003-07-10	Toronto, Ontario	Lakehead (OUA)	—
27	(Finland)	Lauri Raiman	Junior	F	5' 11" (1.8 m)	181 lb (82 kg)	2004-01-27	Vantaa, Finland	Lahti Pelicans U20 (U20 SM-sarja)	—
28	(Canada)	Teydon Trembecky	Freshman	F	5' 11" (1.8 m)	181 lb (82 kg)	2005-05-28	Strathcona, Alberta	Victoria Royals (WHL)	—
29	(Canada)	Ryder Matter	Sophomore	F	6' 0" (1.83 m)	185 lb (84 kg)	2004-09-15	Beaumont, Alberta	Spruce Grove Saints (BCHL)	—
30	(Finland)	Max Väyrynen	Senior	G	6' 2" (1.88 m)	183 lb (83 kg)	2002-06-18	Espoo, Finland	Porin Ässät U20 (U20 SM-sarja)	—
31	(United States)	Bryant Lee	Sophomore	G	6' 0" (1.83 m)	170 lb (77 kg)	2006-07-14	Houghton, Michigan	Houghton High School (MHSAA)	—
35	(United States)	Owen Bartoszkiewicz	Junior	G	6' 1" (1.85 m)	195 lb (88 kg)	2003-03-11	Northville, Michigan	Lindenwood (NCAA)	—
37	(United States)	Ryan Manzella	Sophomore	G	6' 0" (1.83 m)	174 lb (79 kg)	2004-03-17	Eagan, Minnesota	Sioux Falls Stampede (USHL)	—
77	(Russia)	Stiven Sardarian	Senior	F	6' 1" (1.85 m)	170 lb (77 kg)	2003-02-07	Saint Petersburg, Russia	New Hampshire (HEA)	BUF, 88th overall 2021

== Awards and honors ==
=== Hockey Hall of Fame ===
The following Michigan Tech Huskies have been elected to the Hockey Hall of Fame.

- Tony Esposito (player, 1988)

=== United States Hockey Hall of Fame ===
The following Michigan Tech Huskies have been elected to the United States Hockey Hall of Fame.

- Amo Bessone (coach, 1992)
- Paul Coppo (player, 2004)
- John MacInnes (coach, 2007)

=== NCAA ===
Spencer Penrose Award

- John MacInnes: 1970, 1976

Tournament Most Outstanding Player

- Lou Angotti: 1960, 1962
- Gary Milroy: 1965
- Jim Warden: 1975

==== All-Americans ====
First Team

- 1936–37: Ed Maki
- 1950–51: Joe deBastiani, D
- 1952–53: Bob Monahan, D
- 1958–59: John Kosiancic, F
- 1959–60: George Cuculick, G; Paul Coppo, F
- 1961–62: Henry Åkervall, D; Elov Seger, D; Lou Angotti, F; Jerry Sullivan, F
- 1962–63: Garry Bauman, G; George Hill, F
- 1963–64: Garry Bauman, G
- 1964–65: Tony Esposito, G
- 1965–66: Tony Esposito, G; Bruce Riutta, D
- 1966–67: Tony Esposito, G; Rick Best, G; Bruce Riutta, D; Gary Milroy, F
- 1968–69: Al Karlander, F
- 1970–71: Morris Trewin, G; Bob Murray, D
- 1973–74: Jim Nahrgang, D; Mike Zuke, F
- 1974–75: Bob D'Alvise, F
- 1975–76: Mike Zuke, F
- 1980–81: Tim Watters, D
- 1992–93: Jamie Ram, G
- 1993–94: Jamie Ram, G
- 2014–15: Tanner Kero, F
- 2022–23: Blake Pietila, G

Second Team

- 1951–52: Joe deBastiani, D
- 1954–55: Jack McManus, F
- 1955–56: Jack McManus, F
- 1989–90: Kip Noble, D
- 2004–05: Colin Murphy, F
- 2015–16: Alex Petan, F
- 2021–22: Brian Halonen, F

=== WCHA ===
==== Individual awards ====
Player of the Year

- Bob Murray: 1971
- Mike Zuke: 1976
- Tanner Kero: 2015
- Alex Petan: 2016

Outstanding Student-Athlete of the Year

- Geoff Sarjeant: 1992
- Eli Vlaisavljevich: 2010
- Tanner Kero: 2015
- Jamie Phillips: 2016

Sophomore of the Year

- Lou Angotti: 1960
- George Hill: 1963
- Gary Milroy: 1965

Coach of the Year

- John MacInnes: 1960, 1962, 1966, 1971, 1976
- Herb Boxer: 1988
- Jamie Russell: 2007
- Mel Pearson: 2012, 2016

Freshman of the Year

- Mike Usitalo: 1971
- Mike Zuke: 1973

Defensive Player of the Year

- Andy Sutton: 1998

Most Valuable Player in Tournament

- Shane Hanna: 2017
- Patrick Munson: 2018

==== All-Conference Teams ====
First Team All-WCHA

- 1954–55: Bob McManus, G
- 1955–56: Jack McManus, F
- 1959–60: Henry Åkervall, G; John Kosiancic, F
- 1961–62: Garry Bauman, D; Henry Åkervall, D; Lou Angotti, F; Jerry Sullivan, F
- 1962–63: Garry Bauman, G; George Hill, F
- 1963–64: Garry Bauman, G; Norm Wimmer, D
- 1964–65: Tony Esposito, G
- 1965–66: Tony Esposito, G; Bruce Riutta, D
- 1966–67: Tony Esposito, G
- 1968–69: Al Karlander, F
- 1970–71: Morris Trewin, G; Bob Murray, D
- 1973–74: Jim Nahrgang, D; Mike Zuke, F
- 1974–75: Jim Warden, G; Bob D'Alvise, F
- 1975–76: George Lyle, F; Mike Zuke, F
- 1980–81: Tim Watters, D
- 1988–89: Shawn Harrison, F
- 1989–90: Kip Noble, D
- 1992–93: Jamie Ram, G
- 1993–94: Jamie Ram, G
- 1997–98: Andre Savage, F
- 2004–05: Colin Murphy, F
- 2014–15: Jamie Phillips, G; Tanner Kero, F
- 2015–16: Alex Petan, F
- 2016–17: Matt Roy, D

Second Team All-WCHA

- 1951–52: Joe deBastiani, D
- 1952–53: Joe deBastiani, F
- 1954–55: Jack McManus, F
- 1955–56: Bob McManus, G
- 1956–57: Jack McManus, F; Tom Kennedy, F
- 1959–60: George Cuculick, G; Gerald Fabbro, F; Paul Coppo, F
- 1960–61: Bill Rowe, G; Henry Åkervall, D; Lou Angotti, F; Jerry Sullivan, F
- 1961–62: Elov Seger, D; Gene Rebellato, F
- 1962–63: Gary Begg, D; John Ivanitz, F
- 1963–64: Scott Watson, F; George Hill, F
- 1964–65: Dennis Huculak, D; Gary Milroy, F
- 1965–66: Dennis Huculak, D; Wayne Weller, F
- 1966–67: Rick Best, G; Bruce Riutta, D; Bob Toothill, F; Gary Milroy, F
- 1967–68: Dick Sieradzki, D; Al Karlander, F
- 1970–71: Mike Usitalo, F
- 1972–73: Jim Nahrgang, D
- 1973–74: Rick Quance, G; Lorne Stamler, F
- 1974–75: Bob Lorimer, D; Mike Zuke, F
- 1975–76: John Rockwell, G; Gord Salt, F
- 1987–88: John Archibald, F
- 1990–91: Kelly Hurd, F
- 1992–93: John Young, F
- 1997–98: Andy Sutton, D
- 2003–04: Chris Conner, F
- 2004–05: Lars Helminen, D
- 2014–15: Alex Petan, F; Malcolm Gould, F
- 2015–16: Jamie Phillips, G; Matt Roy, D
- 2016–17: Shane Hanna, D
- 2020–21: Colin Swoyer, D

Third Team All-WCHA

- 1996–97: Andre Savage, F
- 2004–05: Cam Ellsworth, G
- 2006–07: Michael-Lee Teslak, G
- 2014–15: Shane Hanna, D; Blake Pietila, F
- 2015–16: Shane Hanna, D; Malcolm Gould, F; Tyler Heinonen, F
- 2016–17: Tyler Heinonen, F
- 2017–18: Mitch Reinke, D
- 2019–20: Matt Jurusik, G
- 2020–21: Trenton Bliss, F

All-WCHA Rookie Team

- 1990–91: Jamie Ram, G
- 1992–93: Jason Wright, D; Pat Mikesch, F
- 2012–13: Alex Petan, F
- 2013–14: Shane Hanna, D
- 2015–16: Jake Lucchini, F
- 2016–17: Angus Redmond, G; Mitch Reinke, D
- 2017–18: Mitch Reinke, D
- 2018–19: Brian Halonen, F
- 2020–21: Arvid Caderoth, F

=== CCHA ===
==== Individual awards ====
Player of the Year

- Blake Pietila: 2023

Goaltender of the Year

- Blake Pietila: 2023

Rookie of the Year

- Kyle Kukkonen: 2023
- Elias Jansson: 2025

Coach of the Year

- Joe Shawhan: 2023

Best Defensive Defenseman

- Chase Pietila: 2025

==== All-Conference Teams ====
First Team All-CCHA

- 2021–22: Brian Halonen, F
- 2022–23: Blake Pietila, G; Ryland Mosley, F
- 2024–25: Chase Pietila, D

Second Team All-CCHA

- 2021–22: Blake Pietila, G; Colin Swoyer, D; Trenton Bliss, F
- 2022–23: Brett Thorne, D
- 2023–24: Blake Pietila, G; Isaac Gordon, F

All-CCHA Rookie Team

- 2022–23: Kyle Kukkonen, F
- 2023–24: Isaac Gordon, F
- 2024–25: Rylan Brown, D; Elias Jansson, F; Logan Morrell, F

== Michigan Tech Hall of Fame ==
The following is a list of people associated with Michigan Tech 's men's ice hockey program who were elected into the Michigan Tech University Athletic Hall of Fame (induction date in parentheses).

- 1961–62 Team (2012)
- 1964–65 Team (2014)
- 1974–75 Team (2016)
- Henry Åkervall (1990)
- Lou Angotti (1991)
- Garry Bauman (1992)
- Russ Becker (2010)
- Gary Begg (1997)
- Rick Best (1994)
- Tom Bissett (2014)
- Rick Boehm (2000)
- Herb Boxer (2009)
- Peter Buchmann (1987)
- Steve Coates (2018)
- Paul Coppo (1985)
- George Cuculick (1998)
- Bob D'Alvise (1989)
- Joe deBastiani (2000)
- Tony Esposito (1990)
- Gerald Fabbro (2005)
- Dan Farrell (2011)
- Peter Grant (2005)
- John Grisdale (1997)
- Fred Hall (2001)
- Bob Hauswirth (1994)
- George Hill (2001)
- Bruce Horsch (2007)
- Art Karam (1987)
- Al Karlander (1990)
- John Kosiancic (1994)
- Doug Latimer (1986)
- Bob Lorimer (1992)
- George Lyle (1993)
- John MacInnes (1985)
- Abbie Maki (1987)
- Ed Maki (1985)
- Randy McKay (1999)
- Al McLeod (2008)
- Bob McManus (2001)
- Jack McManus (1995)
- Gary Milroy (2004)
- Bob Monahan (1993)
- Bob Murray (1996)
- Jim Nahrgang (1989)
- Ken Naples (2003)
- Kip Noble (2018)
- Allan Olson (1991)
- Marcus Olson (1986)
- Ted Olson (2003)
- Stuart Ostlund (2002)
- Ken Pelto (2001)
- Brent Peterson (2016)
- Ray Puro (2004)
- Jamie Ram (2010)
- Damian Rhodes (2006)
- Bruce Riutta (1987)
- John Rockwell (2006)
- Elov Seger (1998)
- Bill Steele (2012)
- Jerry Sullivan (1986)
- Bill Terry (2011)
- Mike Usitalo (2008)
- Maurice Villeneuve(1988)
- Jim Warden (2007)
- Tim Watters (1997)
- Glen Weller (2005)
- Scott White (2016)
- Rick Yeo (1988)
- John Young (2008)
- Mike Zuke (1988)

== Huskies in the NHL ==
As of July 1, 2025.

= NHL All-Star team	= NHL All-Star	= NHL All-Star and NHL All-Star team	= Hall of Famers

Player	Position	Team(s)	Years	Games	Stanley Cups
Lou Angotti	Right Wing	NYR, CHI, PHI, PIT, STL	1964–1974	653	0
Garry Bauman	Goaltender	MTL, MNS	1966–1969	35	0
Tom Bissett	Left Wing	DET	1990–1991	5	0
Chris Cichocki	Right Wing	DET, NJD	1985–1989	68	0
Steve Coates	Right Wing	DET	1976–1977	5	0
Chris Conner	Right Wing	DAL, PIT, DET, PHO, WSH	2006–2015	180	0
Pheonix Copley	Goaltender	STL, WSH, LAK	2015–Present	77	0
Chris Durno	Left Wing	COL	2008–2010	43	0
Tony Esposito	Goaltender	MTL, CHI	1968–1984	886	1
John Grisdale	Defenseman	TOR, VAN	1972–1979	250	0
Brian Halonen	Left Wing	NJD	2023–Present	4	0
Steve Jensen	Left Wing	MNS, LAK	1975–1982	438	0
Al Karlander	Center	DET	1969–1973	212	0
Tanner Kero	Center	CHI, VAN, DAL	2015–2022	134	0
Jujhar Khaira	Left Wing	EDM, CHI, MIN	2015–2024	337	0
Geoff Kinrade	Defenseman	TBL	2008–2009	1	0
Joel L'Esperance	Center	DAL	2018-2021	33	0
Michael Lauen	Forward	WPG	1983–1984	3	0
Bob Lorimer	Defenseman	NYI , COR, NJD	1976–1986	529	2
Jake Lucchini	Center	OTT, MIN, NSH	2022–Present	54	0
George Lyle	Forward	DET, HFD	1979–1983	99	0
Darcy Martini	Defenseman	EDM	1993–1994	2	0
Jim Mayer	Right Wing	NYR	1979–1980	4	0
Randy McKay	Right Wing	DET, NJD, DAL, MTL	1988–2003	932	2
Al McLeod	Defenseman	DET	1973–1974	26	0
Gord McRae	Goaltender	TOR	1972–1978	71	0

Player	Position	Team(s)	Years	Games	Stanley Cups
Glenn Merkosky	Forward	HFD, NJD, DET	1981–1990	66	0
Lyle Moffat	Left Wing	TOR, WPG	1972–1980	97	0
Bob Murray	Defenseman	ATF, VAN	1973–1977	194	0
Jim Nahrgang	Defenseman	DET	1974–1977	57	0
Davis Payne	Right Wing	BOS	1995–1997	22	0
Brent Peterson	Left Wing	TBL	1996–1999	56	0
Blake Pietila	Left Wing	NJD	2015–2019	38	0
Jamie Ram	Goaltender	NYR	1995–1996	1	0
Dave Reierson	Defenseman	CGY	1988–1989	2	0
Mitch Reinke	Defenseman	STL	2017–2021	1	0
Damian Rhodes	Goaltender	TOR, OTT, ATL	1990–2002	309	0
Matt Roy	Defenseman	LAK, WSH	2018–Present	438	0
Jarkko Ruutu	Left Wing	VAN, PIT, OTT, ANA	1999–2011	652	0
Geoff Sarjeant	Goaltender	STL, SJS	1994–1996	8	0
Andre Savage	Center	BOS, PHI	1998–2003	66	0
John Scott	Left Wing	MIN, CHI, NYR, BUF, SJS, PHO, MTL	2008–2016	286	0
Lorne Stamler	Left Wing	LAK, TOR, WPG	1976–1980	116	0
Tony Stiles	Defenseman	CGY	1983–1984	30	0
Jim Storm	Left Wing	HFD, DAL	1987–1991	84	0
Andy Sutton	Left Wing	SJS, MIN, ATL, NYI, OTT, ANA, EDM	1998–2012	676	0
Bill Terry	Center	MNS	1987–1988	5	0
Tim Watters	Defenseman	WPG, LAK	1981–1995	741	0
Brian Watts	Left Wing	DET	1975–1976	4	0
Clay Wilson	Defenseman	CBJ, ATL, FLA, CGY	2002–2012	36	0
Warren Young	Forward	MNS, PIT, DET	1981–1988	236	0
Mike Zuke	Center	STL, HFD	1978–1986	455	0

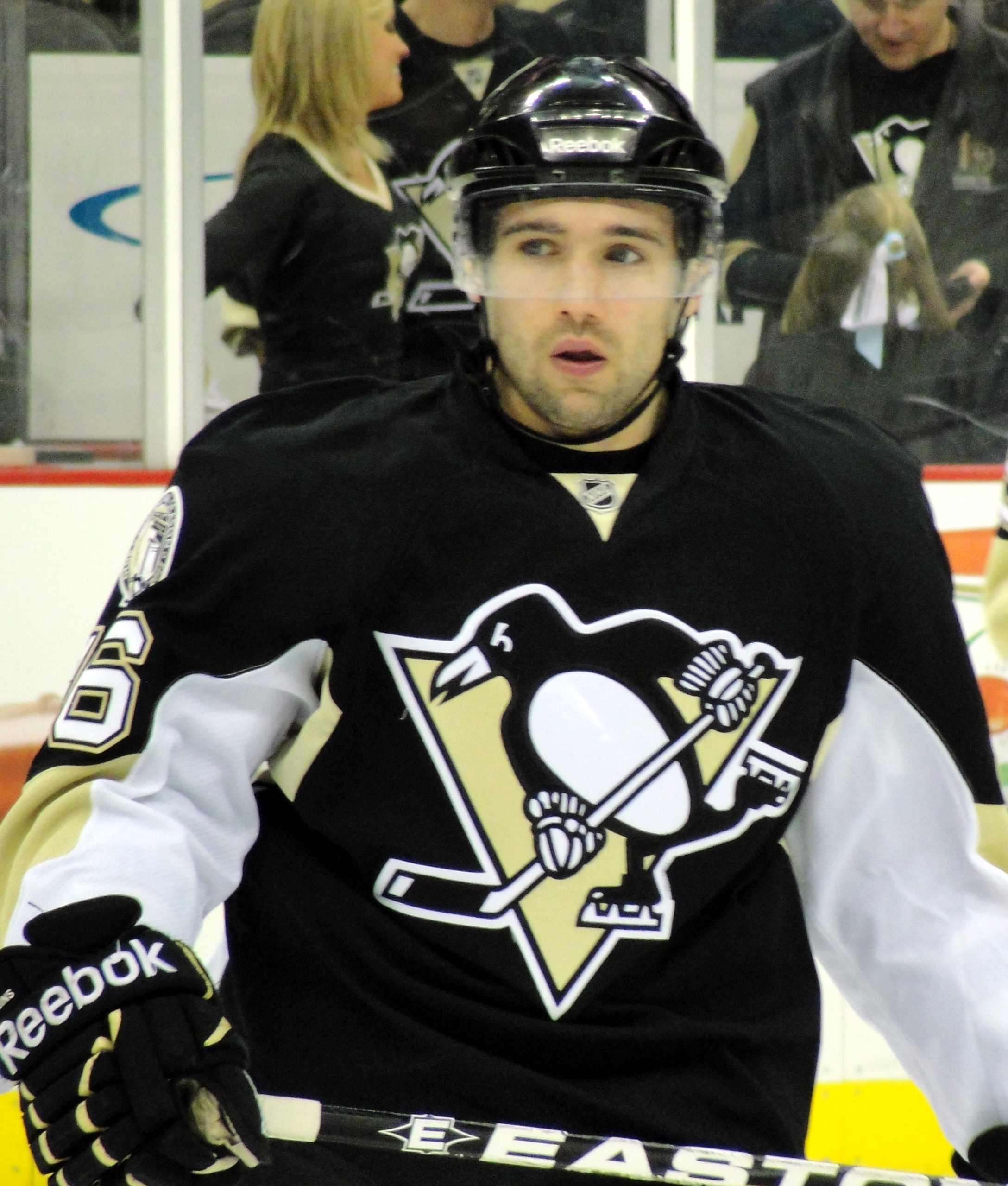
Chris Conner

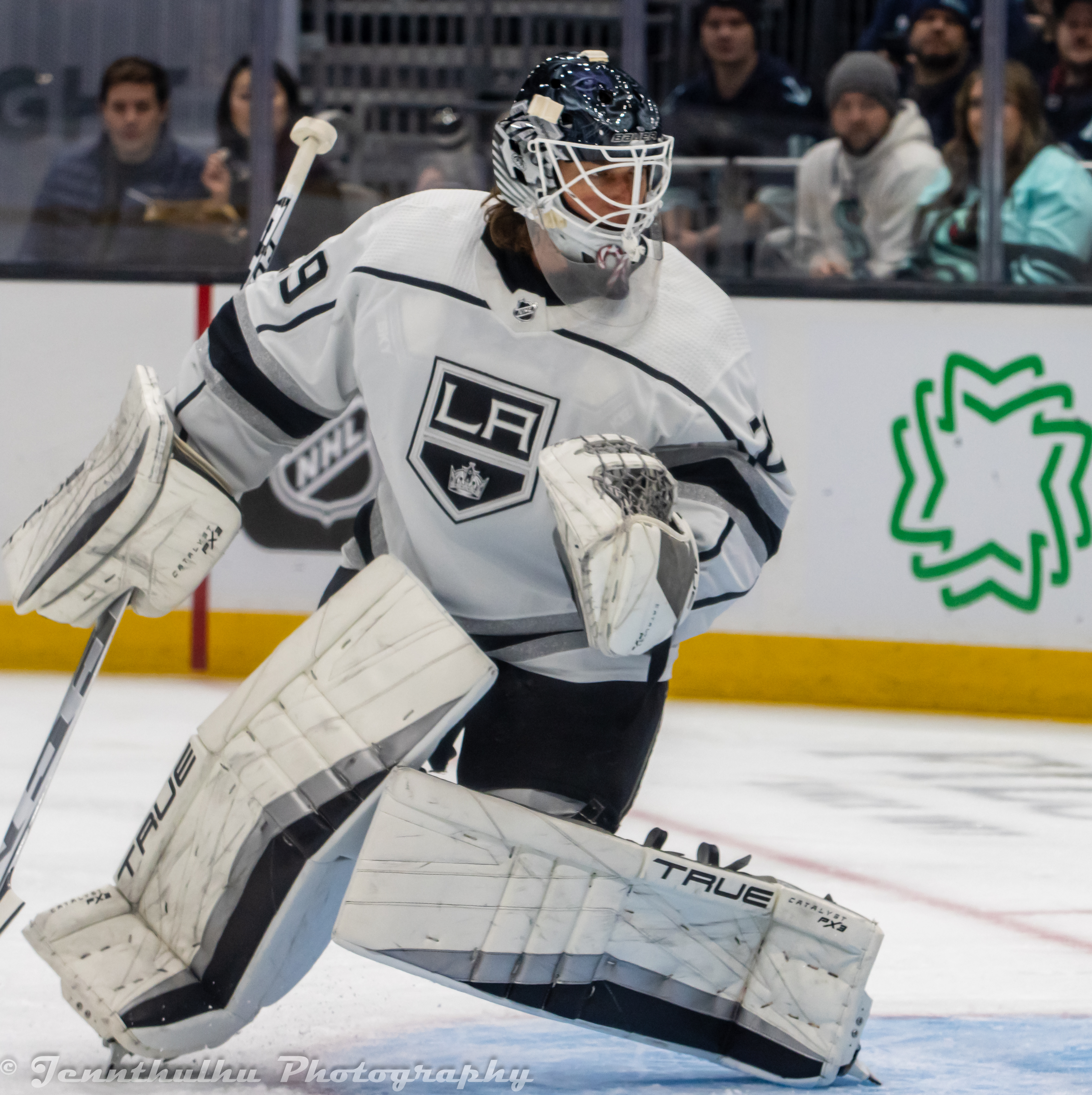
Pheonix Copley

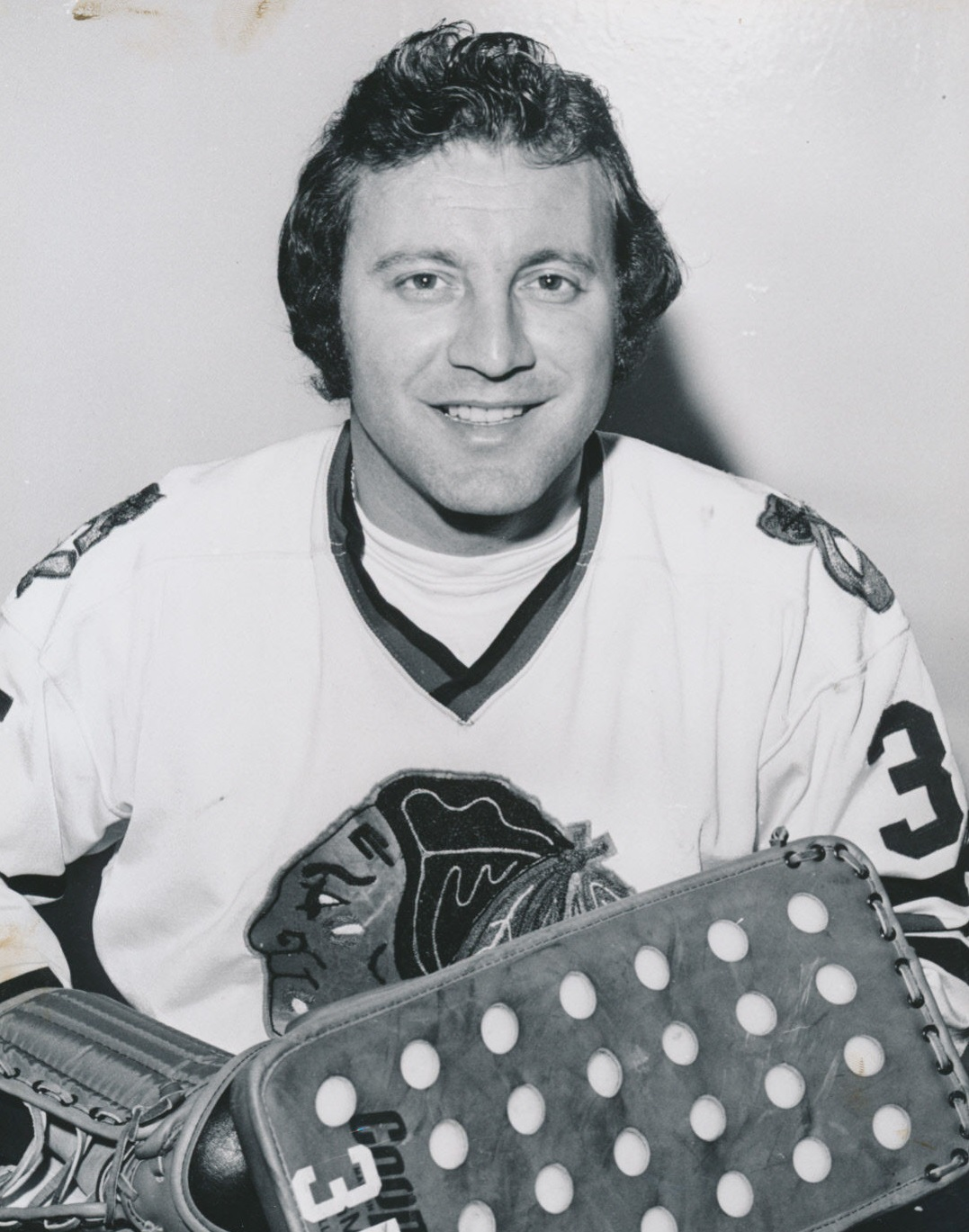
Tony Esposito

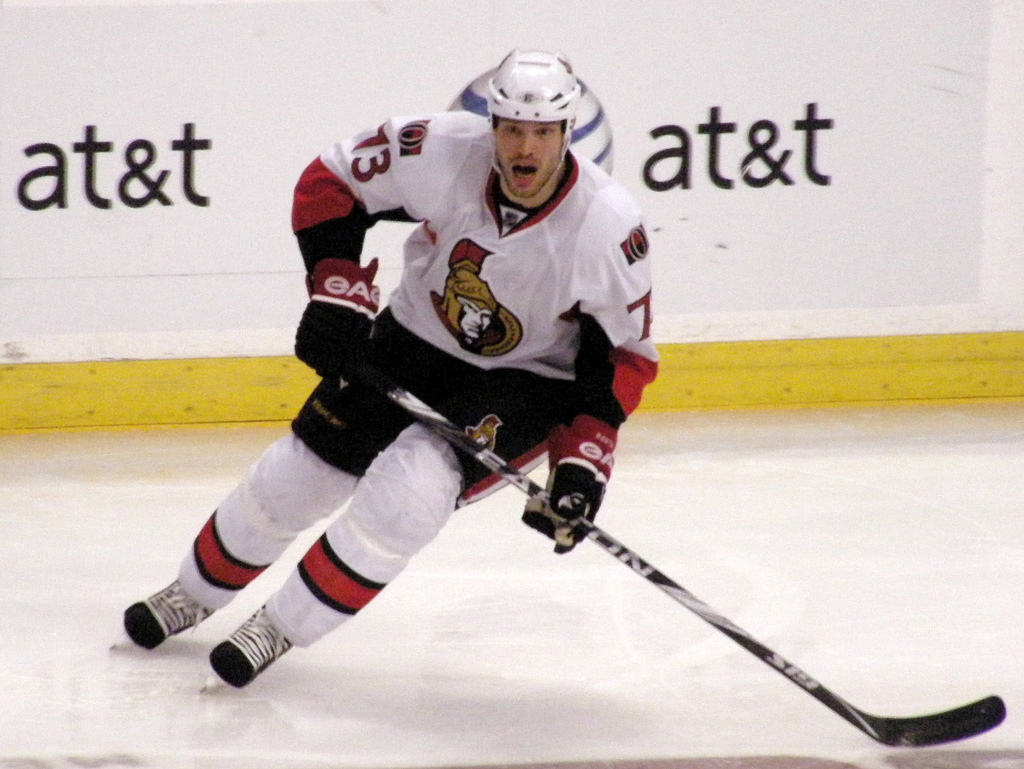
Jarkko Ruutu

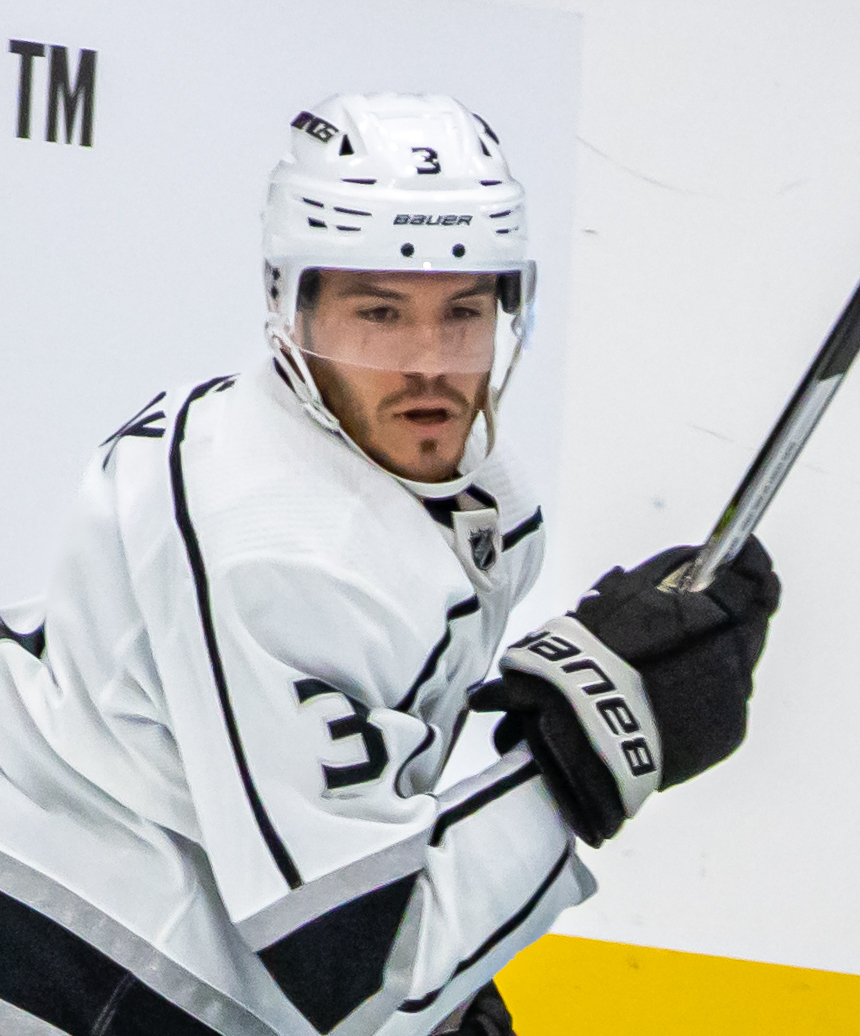
Matt Roy

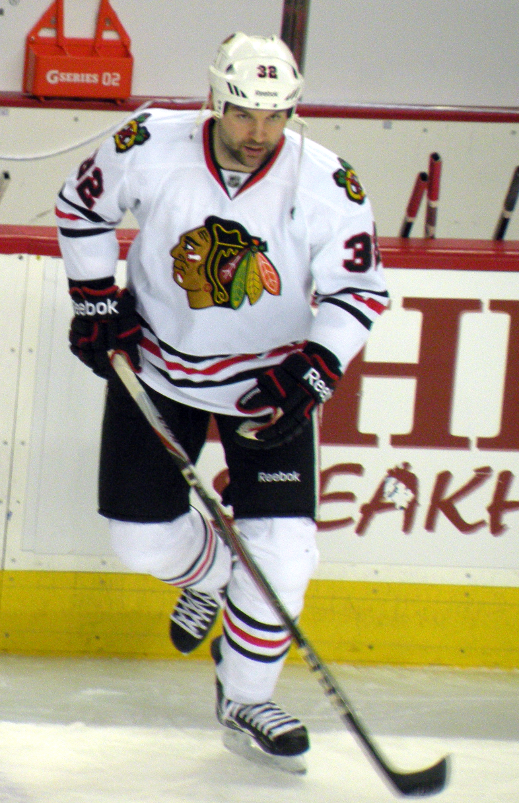
John Scott

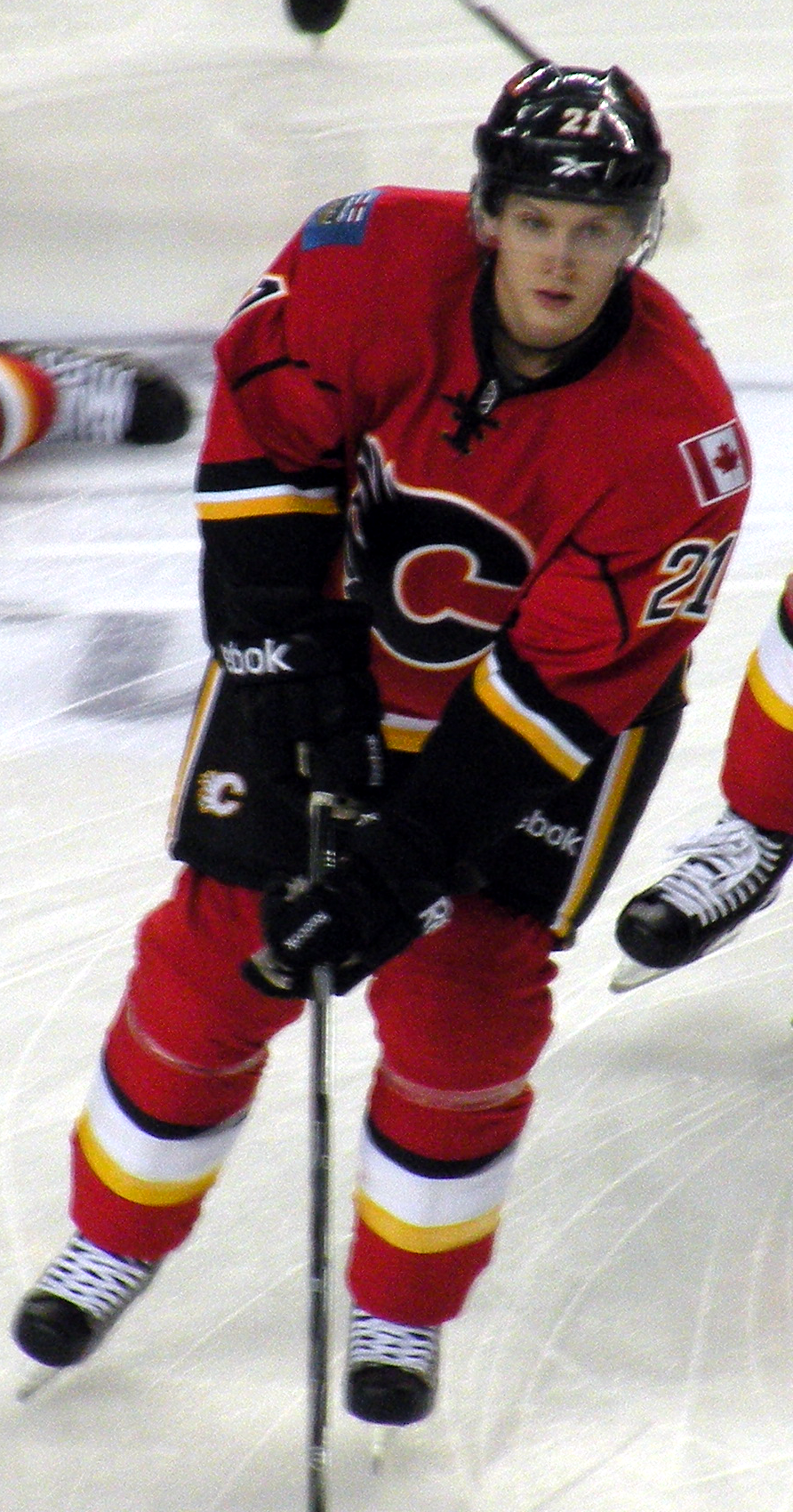
Clay Wilson

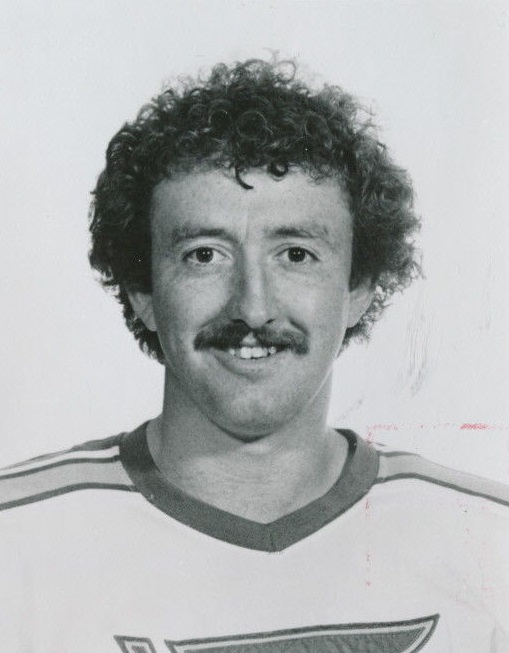
Mike Zuke

=== WHA ===
Several players also were members of WHA teams.

Player	Position	Team(s)	Years	Avco Cups
Bruce Abbey	Defenseman	CIN	1975–1976	0
Lou Angotti	Right Wing	CHC	1974–1975	0
Bob D'Alvise	Center	TOT	1975–1976	0
Ken Desjardine	Defenseman	QUE, IND, CAC	1972–1973	0
Bill Hughes	Goaltender	HOU	1972–1973	0
Al Karlander	Center	NEW, IND	1973–1977	0
George Lyle	Forward	NEW	1976–1979	0
Jim Mayer	Forward	CAC, NEW, EDM	1976–1979	0
Al McLeod	Defenseman	PHX, HOU, IND	1974–1979	0
Lyle Moffat	Defenseman	CLC, WIN	1975–1979	3
Darwin Mott	Forward	PHB	1972–1973	0
Bill Prentice	Defenseman	HOU, IND, QUE, EDM	1972–1978	2
Bill Steele	Right Wing	CIN	1975–1977	0
Mike Zuke	Center	IND, EDM	1976–1978	0

== Olympians ==
This is a list of Michigan Tech alumni were a part of an Olympic team.

Name	Position	Michigan Tech Tenure	Team	Year	Finish
Paul Coppo	Center	1957–1960	(United States) USA	1964	5th
Henry Åkervall	Defenseman	1959–1962	Canada	1964	4th
Gary Begg	Center	1960–1963	Canada	1964	4th
Bruce Riutta	Defenseman	1964–1967	(United States) USA	1968	6th
Paul Jensen	Defenseman	1973–1975, 1976–1978	(United States) USA	1976	5th
Steve Jensen	Left Wing	1973–1975	(United States) USA	1976	5th
Jim Warden	Goaltender	1972–1975	(United States) USA	1976	5th
Tim Watters	Defenseman	1977–1979, 1980–1981	Canada	1980, 1988	6th, 4th
Tony Stiles	Defenseman	1978–1982	Canada	1988	4th
Jarkko Ruutu	Left Wing	1995–1996	Finland	2002, 2006, 2010	6th, Silver, Bronze
Alex Petan	Forward	2012–2016	(Italy) ITA	2026	12th

== See also ==
- Michigan Tech Huskies
