= Al McLeod =

Canadian ice hockey player

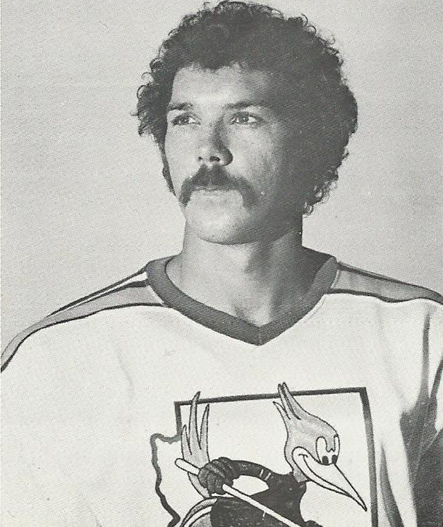
- Born: June 17, 1949 (age 76) Medicine Hat, Alberta, Canada
- Height: 5 ft 11 in (180 cm)
- Weight: 195 lb (88 kg; 13 st 13 lb)
- Position: Defenceman
- Shot: Left
- Played for: Indianapolis Racers; Phoenix Roadrunners; Detroit Red Wings; Houston Aeros
- Playing career: 1971–1979

Allan Sidney McLeod (born June 17, 1949) is a Canadian former professional ice hockey player who played 342 games in the World Hockey Association and 26 games in the National Hockey League between 1974 and 1979. He played for the Indianapolis Racers, Phoenix Roadrunners, Detroit Red Wings and Houston Aeros.

== Career statistics ==
=== Regular season and playoffs ===
			Regular season					Playoffs
Season	Team	League	GP	G	A	Pts	PIM	GP	G	A	Pts	PIM
1966–67	Calgary Buffaloes	CMJHL	—	—	—	—	—	—	—	—	—	—
1967–68	Michigan Technological University	WCHA	—	—	—	—	—	—	—	—	—	—
1968–69	Michigan Technological University	WCHA	23	2	3	5	10	—	—	—	—	—
1969–70	Michigan Technological University	WCHA	34	14	17	31	32	—	—	—	—	—
1970–71	Michigan Technological University	WCHA	32	13	26	39	14	—	—	—	—	—
1971–72	Fort Worth Wings	CHL	22	1	6	7	4	—	—	—	—	—
1971–72	Port Huron Wings	IHL	35	1	12	13	15	15	0	3	3	13
1972–73	Virginia Wings	AHL	76	4	15	19	105	13	0	1	1	12
1973–74	Detroit Red Wings	NHL	26	2	2	4	24	—	—	—	—	—
1973–74	Virginia Wings	AHL	54	1	13	14	52	—	—	—	—	—
1974–75	Phoenix Roadrunners	WHA	77	3	16	19	98	5	0	4	4	4
1975–76	Phoenix Roadrunners	WHA	80	2	18	20	82	5	0	2	2	4
1976–77	Phoenix Roadrunners	WHA	29	1	5	6	35	—	—	—	—	—
1976–77	Houston Aeros	WHA	51	7	21	28	20	10	1	3	4	9
1977–78	Houston Aeros	WHA	80	2	22	24	54	6	1	0	1	2
1978–79	Indianapolis Racers	WHA	25	0	11	11	22	—	—	—	—	—
WHA totals			342	15	93	108	311	26	2	9	11	19
NHL totals			26	2	2	4	24	—	—	—	—	—
