= Bill Terry (ice hockey) =

Canadian ice hockey player

- Born: July 13, 1961 (age 63); Toronto, Ontario, Canada
- Height: 5 ft 8 in (173 cm)
- Weight: 170 lb (77 kg; 12 st 2 lb)
- Position: Centre
- Shot: Right
- Played for: Minnesota North Stars; HC Ajoie
- NHL draft: Undrafted
- Playing career: 1984–1992

William Charles Terry (born July 13, 1961 in Toronto, Ontario) is a Canadian former professional ice hockey player who played five games in the National Hockey League (NHL) with the Minnesota North Stars during the 1987–88 season. The rest of his career, which lasted from 1984 to 1992, was split between the International Hockey League and time in Germany and Switzerland. As a youth, he played in the 1974 Quebec International Pee-Wee Hockey Tournament with a minor ice hockey team from Wexford, Toronto.

== Career statistics ==
=== Regular season and playoffs ===
			Regular season					Playoffs
Season	Team	League	GP	G	A	Pts	PIM	GP	G	A	Pts	PIM
1978–79	Sault Ste. Marie Greyhounds	OMJHL	68	28	21	49	85	—	—	—	—	—
1979–80	Sault Ste. Marie Greyhounds	OMJHL	68	21	34	55	64	—	—	—	—	—
1980–81	Michigan Tech	WCHA	40	23	19	42	12	—	—	—	—	—
1981–82	Michigan Tech	WCHA	35	26	24	50	37	—	—	—	—	—
1982–83	Michigan Tech	WCHA	37	19	29	48	37	—	—	—	—	—
1983–84	Michigan Tech	WCHA	40	23	17	40	40	—	—	—	—	—
1983–84	Toledo Goaldiggers	IHL	3	2	2	4	4	—	—	—	—	—
1984–85	Augsburger EV	GER-2	34	28	33	61	28	—	—	—	—	—
1985–86	Kalamazoo Wings	IHL	78	43	66	109	28	6	6	4	10	8
1986–87	Kalamazoo Wings	IHL	27	11	22	33	8	—	—	—	—	—
1987–88	Minnesota North Stars	NHL	5	0	0	0	0	—	—	—	—	—
1987–88	Kalamazoo Wings	IHL	77	31	54	85	75	7	5	5	10	6
1988–89	HC Ajoie	NLA	13	9	6	15	16	—	—	—	—	—
1989–90	SC Herisau	NLB	36	42	34	76	30	10	5	10	15	9
1990–91	SC Herisau	NLB	23	23	24	47	34	—	—	—	—	—
1991–92	Lausanne HC	NLB	4	8	7	15	2	—	—	—	—	—
IHL totals			185	87	144	231	115	13	11	9	20	14
NHL totals			5	0	0	0	0	—	—	—	—	—
