= Henry Åkervall =

Canadian ice hockey player

- Born: August 24, 1937 Port Arthur, Ontario, Canada
- Died: February 18, 2000 (aged 62) Port Arthur, Ontario, Canada
- Height: 5 ft 11 in (180 cm)
- Weight: 180 lb (82 kg; 12 st 12 lb)
- Position: Defence
- Played for: Tappara Tampere (Finland); Warroad Lakers; Port Arthur Bearcats; Marquette Iron Rangers; Michigan Tech Huskies
- National team: Canada
- Playing career: 1959–1970

Henry "Hank" Åkervall (August 24, 1937 – February 18, 2000) was a Canadian ice hockey defenceman and Olympian.

Åkervall won a national title in 1962 with Michigan Tech. After graduating he played with Team Canada at the 1964 Winter Olympics held in Innsbruck, Austria.

After his hockey career he coached the Lakehead Nor'Westers to an International Collegiate Hockey Association championship in 1967, was recreation director for Thunder Bay.

== Awards and honours ==
Award	Year
All-WCHA First Team	1959–60
NCAA All-Tournament Second Team	1960
All-WCHA Second Team	1960–61
All-WCHA First Team	1961–62
AHCA West All-American	1961–62
NCAA All-Tournament First Team	1962
