= 1962 NCAA men's ice hockey tournament =

College ice hockey tournament

- Teams: 4
- Finals site: Utica Memorial Auditorium, Utica, New York
- Champions: Michigan Tech Huskies (1st title)
- Runner-up: Clarkson Golden Knights (1st title game)
- Semifinalists: Michigan Wolverines (11th Frozen Four); St. Lawrence Saints (7th Frozen Four)
- Winning coach: John MacInnes (1st title)
- MOP: Lou Angotti (Michigan Tech)
- Attendance: 11,451

The 1962 NCAA Division I men's ice hockey tournament was the culmination of the 1961–62 NCAA men's ice hockey season, the 15th such tournament in NCAA history. It was held between March 15 and 17, 1962, and concluded with Michigan Tech defeating Clarkson 7–1. All games were played at the Utica Memorial Auditorium in Utica, New York.

== Qualifying teams ==
Four teams qualified for the tournament, two each from the eastern and western regions. The ECAC tournament champion and the WCHA tournament champion received automatic bids into the tournament. Two at-large bids were offered to one eastern and one western team based upon both their tournament finish as well as their regular season record.

East							West						
Seed	School	Conference	Record	Berth type	Appearance	Last bid	Seed	School	Conference	Record	Berth type	Appearance	Last bid
1	Clarkson	ECAC Hockey	21–2–1	At-Large	3rd	1958	1	Michigan Tech	WCHA	27–3–0	Tournament champion	3rd	1960
2	St. Lawrence	ECAC Hockey	17–7–1	Tournament champion	7th	1961	2	Michigan	WCHA	21–4–0	At-Large	11th	1957

== Format ==
The higher-ranked ECAC team was seeded as the top eastern team while the WCHA champion was given the top western seed. The second eastern seed was slotted to play the top western seed and vice versa. All games were played at the Utica Memorial Auditorium. All matches were Single-game eliminations with the semifinal winners advancing to the national championship game and the losers playing in a consolation game.

== Bracket ==
Semifinals; March 15–16
E1	Clarkson	5
W2	Michigan	4
W1	Michigan Tech	6
E2	St. Lawrence	1

National championship March 17
E1	Clarkson	1
W1	Michigan Tech	7
Third-place game
W2	Michigan	5
E2	St. Lawrence	1

Note: * denotes overtime period(s)

=== Semifinals ===
==== Clarkson vs. Michigan ====
March 15	Clarkson	5 – 4	Michigan	Utica Memorial Auditorium	Recap
(Pettersen) Bert Halliwell - 06:11 (Wagner) Bob Taylor - PP - 15:56		First period	19:53 - Ross Morrison (Babcock)
(unassisted) Arnie Lawlor - SH - 05:27 (Wilkinson) Roger Purdie - 08:41		Second period	09:04 - Bill Kelly (Hinnegan)
(unassited) Corby Adams - PP GW - 12:49		Third period	00:38 - Red Berenson (unassisted); 17:50 - Red Berenson (Wilkie)
(25 saves) Wayne Gibbons		Goalie stats	Bob Gray (20 saves)

==== Michigan Tech vs. St. Lawrence ====
March 16	Michigan Tech	6 – 1	St. Lawrence	Utica Memorial Auditorium
(Angotti, Seger) Don Hermanson - PP - 14:30		First period	11:09 - PP - Jim McInnes (unassisted)
(Draper, Akervall) Don Hermanson - PP GW - 10:11 (Begg) Scott Watson - 12:40		Second period
(Rebellato, Ivanitz) Jerry Sullivan - 04:45 (Casey) Lou Angotti - 05:41 (Pallante) John Ivanitz - 14:29		Third period
Garry Bauman ( 14 saves )		Goalie stats	( 49 saves ) Richie Broadbelt

=== Consolation Game ===
==== St. Lawrence vs. Michigan ====
March 17	St. Lawrence	1 – 5	Michigan	Utica Memorial Auditorium	Recap
No scoring		First period	01:10 - Red Berenson (unassisted); 01:57 - GW - Jerry Kolb (Babcock, Kartusch); 18:28 - Gordie Wilkie (Rogers, Wilson)
(Shea) Arlie Parker - 03:13		Second period	05:58 - Gordie Wilkie (Kolb); 16:36 - PP - Ron Coristine (Kolb, Babcock)
No scoring		Third period	No scoring
(39 saves) Richie Broadbelt (5 saves) Bruce Jones		Goalie stats	Bob Gray (15 saves)

=== National Championship ===
==== Clarkson vs. Michigan Tech ====
March 17	Clarkson	1 – 7	Michigan Tech	Utica Memorial Auditorium

Scoring summary
Period	Team	Goal	Assist(s)	Time	Score
1st	MTU	John Ivanitz	unassisted	0:38	1–0 MTU
1st	MTU	John Ivanitz – GW	Sullivan	5:38	2–0 MTU
1st	MTU	Jerry Sullivan	Merlo and Rebellato	9:26	3–0 MTU
1st	CLK	Joseph LaPointe – PP	Pettersen	19:42	3–1 MTU
2nd	None				
3rd	MTU	Jerry Sullivan	Ivanitz and Rebellato	40:38	4–1 MTU
3rd	MTU	John Ivanitz	Sullivan and Rebellato	44:53	5–1 MTU
3rd	MTU	Lou Angotti	unassisted	46:14	6–1 MTU
3rd	MTU	Lou Angotti	unassisted	59:20	7–1 MTU
Penalty summary
Period	Team	Player	Penalty	Time	PIM
1st	CLK	Robert Taylor	Illegal Check	9:40	2:00
1st	MTU	Bob Pallante	Elbowing	13:33	2:00
1st	MTU	Bob Pallante	Interference	18:35	2:00
2nd	CLK	Corby Adams	Illegal Check	21:32	2:00
2nd	MTU	Albert Merlo	Slashing	26:56	2:00
2nd	MTU	Norman Wimmer	Elbowing	30:12	2:00
2nd	MTU	Henry Akervall	Interference	32:04	2:00
3rd	MTU	Elov Seger	Boarding	49:05	2:00
3rd	MTU	Bob Pallante	Spearing	50:52	2:00
3rd	MTU	Gene Rebellato	Holding	56:55	2:00
3rd	MTU	Bob Pallante	Holding	58:10	2:00
3rd	CLK	Frank Schmeler	Tripping	58:17	2:00

Shots by period
Team	1	2	3	T
Clarkson	12	13	15	40
Michigan Tech	12	16	16	44

Goaltenders
Team	Name	Saves	Goals against	Time on ice
CLK	Wayne Gibbons	37	7	
MTU	Garry Bauman	39	1	

== All-Tournament team ==
=== First Team ===
- G: Richie Broadbelt (St. Lawrence)
- D: Henry Åkervall (Michigan Tech)
- D: Elov Seger (Michigan Tech)
- F: Lou Angotti* (Michigan Tech)
- F: Red Berenson (Michigan)
- F: John Ivanitz (Michigan Tech)

* Most Outstanding Player(s)

=== Second Team ===
- G: Garry Bauman (Michigan Tech)
- D: Cal Wagner (Clarkson)
- D: Don Rodgers (Michigan)
- F: Jerry Sullivan (Michigan Tech)
- F: Larry Babcock (Michigan)
- F: Hal Pettersen (Clarkson)
