= Tim Watters =

Canadian former ice hockey defenceman (born 1959)

- Born: July 25, 1959 (age 67) Kamloops, British Columbia, Canada
- Height: 5 ft 11 in (180 cm)
- Weight: 180 lb (82 kg; 12 st 12 lb)
- Position: Defence
- Shot: Left
- Played for: Winnipeg Jets; Los Angeles Kings
- National team: Canada
- NHL draft: 124th overall, 1979; Winnipeg Jets
- Playing career: 1981–1995
- Coaching career

Biographical details
- Education: Michigan Tech University

Playing career
- 1977–1981: Michigan Tech

Coaching career (HC unless noted)
- 1995–1996: Boston Bruins (Assistant)
- 1996–2000: Michigan Tech

Head coaching record
- Overall: 39–116–9 (.265) [College]

Medal record

Representing Canada

World Championships
Bronze medal – third place	1983 West Germany	

Timothy John Watters (born July 25, 1959) is a Canadian former ice hockey defenceman.

Tim Watters was a physical defenceman even though he stood under 6 feet tall and under 200 pounds. He played in 2 Olympics and over 700 NHL games, quietly playing a solid though unspectacular role from 1981 through 1995 with the Winnipeg Jets and Los Angeles Kings, two teams that didn't enjoy much success during that span. Not having the size to out-muscle opponents, Watters learned to be in the proper position and angled shooters out of harm's way. He read the oncoming rushes, and cut off passing lanes and blocked shots. He learned to tie up players' sticks and was one of the few modern players to master the hip check.

He retired from the NHL as a player after the 1995 season. He served as an assistant coach for the Boston Bruins during the 1996 season, and as head coach for the NCAA Division I Michigan Tech Huskies from 1996–97 to 1999–2000.

Watters currently resides in Oro Valley, Arizona, where he works in the commercial real estate business. He also coaches youth hockey in nearby Tempe.

== Career statistics ==
=== Regular season and playoffs ===
			Regular season					Playoffs
Season	Team	League	GP	G	A	Pts	PIM	GP	G	A	Pts	PIM
1975–76	Merritt Centennials	BCHL	—	—	—	—	—	—	—	—	—	—
1976–77	Kamloops Braves	BCHL	60	10	38	48	—	—	—	—	—	—
1976–77	Kamloops Chiefs	WCHL	15	3	0	3	29	2	0	0	0	0
1977–78	Michigan Tech University	WCHA	37	1	15	16	47	—	—	—	—	—
1978–79	Michigan Tech University	WCHA	38	6	21	27	48	—	—	—	—	—
1979–80	Canadian National Team	Intl	56	8	21	29	43	—	—	—	—	—
1980–81	Michigan Tech University	WCHA	43	12	38	50	36	—	—	—	—	—
1981–82	Winnipeg Jets	NHL	69	2	22	24	97	4	0	1	1	8
1981–82	Tulsa Oilers	CHL	5	1	2	3	0	—	—	—	—	—
1982–83	Winnipeg Jets	NHL	77	5	18	23	98	3	0	0	0	2
1983–84	Winnipeg Jets	NHL	74	3	20	23	169	3	1	0	1	2
1984–85	Winnipeg Jets	NHL	63	2	20	22	74	8	0	1	1	16
1985–86	Winnipeg Jets	NHL	56	6	8	14	97	—	—	—	—	—
1986–87	Winnipeg Jets	NHL	63	3	13	16	119	10	0	0	0	21
1987–88	Canadian National Team	Intl	10	0	3	3	2	—	—	—	—	—
1987–88	Winnipeg Jets	NHL	36	0	0	0	106	4	0	0	0	4
1988–89	Los Angeles Kings	NHL	76	3	18	21	168	11	0	1	1	6
1989–90	Los Angeles Kings	NHL	62	1	10	11	92	4	0	0	0	6
1990–91	Los Angeles Kings	NHL	45	0	4	4	92	7	0	0	0	12
1991–92	Los Angeles Kings	NHL	37	0	7	7	92	6	0	0	0	8
1991–92	Phoenix Roadrunners	IHL	5	0	3	3	6	—	—	—	—	—
1992–93	Los Angeles Kings	NHL	22	0	2	2	18	22	0	2	2	30
1992–93	Phoenix Roadrunners	IHL	31	3	3	6	43	—	—	—	—	—
1993–94	Los Angeles Kings	NHL	60	1	9	10	67	—	—	—	—	—
1994–95	Los Angeles Kings	NHL	1	0	0	0	0	—	—	—	—	—
1994–95	Phoenix Roadrunners	IHL	36	1	8	9	58	7	0	1	1	10
NHL totals			741	26	151	177	1289	82	1	5	6	115

=== International ===
Year	Team	Event	GP	G	A	Pts	PIM
1980	Canada	OG	6	1	1	2	0
1983	Canada	WC	10	0	0	0	8
1988	Canada	OG	8	0	1	1	2
Senior totals			24	1	2	3	10

== Head coaching record ==
Record table
Season	Team	Overall	Conference	Standing	Postseason
Michigan Tech Huskies (WCHA) (1996–2000)
1996–97	Michigan Tech	8–27–4	5–23–4	10th	WCHA First Round
1997–98	Michigan Tech	17–20–3	10–17–1	7th	WCHA First Round
1998–99	Michigan Tech	9–28–1	9–19–0	8th	WCHA First Round
1999–00	Michigan Tech	4–34–0	2–26–0	10th	WCHA First Round
2000–01	Michigan Tech	1–7–1†	1–7–0†	–	–
Michigan Tech:		39–116–9	27–92–5		
Total:		39–116–9			
National champion Postseason invitational champion Conference regular season champion Conference regular season and conference tournament champion Division regular season champion Division regular season and conference tournament champion Conference tournament champion

† Watters was fired in November and replaced by Mike Sertich

== Awards and honours ==
Award	Year
All-WCHA First Team	1980–81
AHCA West All-American	1980–81
All-NCAA All-Tournament Team	1981
