= Elov Seger =

American ice hockey player

- Born: June 6, 1940 Fort Frances, Ontario, Canada
- Died: March 8, 1968 (aged 27)
- Height: 6 ft 0 in (183 cm)
- Weight: 190 lb (86 kg; 13 st 8 lb)
- Position: Defenseman
- Played for: Michigan Tech; Waterloo Black Hawks; Rochester Mustangs
- Playing career: 1959–1966

Elov Seger (June 6, 1940 – March 8, 1968) was a Canadian ice hockey defenseman who was an All-American and helped Michigan Tech win its first National Championship in 1962.

== Career ==
Seger was a three-year player for the Huskies under head coach John MacInnes, helping the team reach the national championship game as a sophomore. After a down season, the Huskies roared to the top of their conference in 1962, winning 29 of their final 30 games, capturing both the conference and national championships. Seger was named to the All-WCHA Second Team and was selected as an All-American. The last goal he scored for the Huskies tied the game in the WCHA championship and began a 4-goal barrage in the third period.

After graduating, Seger continued his playing career, spending the next four seasons playing in the USHL (then a senior league), but his playing career was cut short when he was diagnosed with a brain tumor. Seger eventually succumbed to the disease in March 1968 but he was not forgotten by Michigan Tech. The program confers the Elov Seger Memorial Award to the player who has shown the greatest improvement. Seger was also inducted into the Michigan Tech Athletic Hall of Fame in 1998.

== Career statistics ==
=== Regular season and playoffs ===
			Regular Season					Playoffs
Season	Team	League	GP	G	A	Pts	PIM	GP	G	A	Pts	PIM
1959–60	Michigan Tech	WCHA	17	0	1	1	12	—	—	—	—	—
1960–61	Michigan Tech	WCHA	23	3	6	9	6	—	—	—	—	—
1961–62	Michigan Tech	WCHA	32	3	12	15	14	—	—	—	—	—
1962–63	Waterloo Black Hawks	USHL	—	4	15	19	0	—	—	—	—	—
1963–64	Waterloo Black Hawks	USHL	—	—	—	—	—	—	—	—	—	—
1964–65	Waterloo Black Hawks	USHL	—	—	—	—	—	—	—	—	—	—
1965–66	Rochester Mustangs	USHL	—	—	—	—	—	—	—	—	—	—
NCAA Totals			72	6	19	25	32	—	—	—	—	—

== Awards and honors ==
Award	Year
All-WCHA Second Team	1961–62
AHCA West All-American	1961–62
NCAA All-Tournament Second Team	1962
