= John Young (ice hockey) =

American ice hockey center

- Born: August 31, 1969 (age 56) St. Paul, Minnesota, U.S.
- Height: 5 ft 10 in (178 cm)
- Weight: 170 lb (77 kg; 12 st 2 lb)
- Position: Center
- Shot: Left
- Played for: Rochester Americans; Cornwall Aces
- Playing career: 1993–1995

John "Hottie" Young (born August 31, 1969) is an American former professional ice hockey and roller hockey center.

== Career ==
Young played professional ice hockey in the American Hockey League for the Rochester Americans and Cornwall Aces, the East Coast Hockey League for the Greensboro Monarchs and the International Hockey League for the Minnesota Moose.

Young also played roller hockey in Roller Hockey International. He began playing for the Minnesota Arctic Blast for the 1994 season, where he led the team in points with 79. He then played for the Minnesota Blue Ox in 1995 before returning to the Arctic Blast in 1996.
