= Jim Nahrgang =

Canadian ice hockey player (born 1951)

- Born: April 17, 1951 (age 75) Millbank, Ontario, Canada
- Height: 6 ft 0 in (183 cm)
- Weight: 185 lb (84 kg; 13 st 3 lb)
- Position: Defence
- Shot: Right
- Played for: Detroit Red Wings
- NHL draft: 86th overall, 1971; Detroit Red Wings
- Playing career: 1974–1978
- Coaching career

Biographical details
- Education: Michigan Tech

Playing career
- 1970–1974: Michigan Tech
- Position: Defenseman

Coaching career (HC unless noted)
- 1978–1982: Michigan Tech (Assistant)
- 1982–1985: Michigan Tech

Head coaching record
- Overall: 56–62–3 (.475)

James Herbert Nahrgang (born April 17, 1951) is a Canadian former professional ice hockey player and coach who played 57 games in the National Hockey League for the Detroit Red Wings between 1975 and 1977. After his playing career he coached Michigan Tech for three years between 1982 and 1985. He was born in Millbank, Ontario.

== Coaching ==
After retiring as a player in 1978 Nahrgang joined the staff at his alma mater as an assistant, remaining with Michigan Tech until John MacInnes retired in 1982. Nahrgang was named as MacInnes' replacement and served three years as head coach before resigning in February 1985. During his tenure the Huskies declined each year and also moved from the CCHA back to their previous conference, the WCHA.

== Career statistics ==
=== Regular season and playoffs ===
			Regular season					Playoffs
Season	Team	League	GP	G	A	Pts	PIM	GP	G	A	Pts	PIM
1966–67	New Hamburg Hahn's	OHA-C	—	—	—	—	—	—	—	—	—	—
1967–68	Ottawa 67's	OHA	52	1	9	10	74	—	—	—	—	—
1968–69	Ottawa 67's	OHA	52	1	7	8	47	7	0	0	0	2
1969–70	Kitchener Rangers	OHA	51	10	23	33	119	6	0	2	2	10
1970–71	Michigan Technological University	WCHA	31	6	13	19	70	—	—	—	—	—
1971–72	Michigan Technological University	WCHA	31	8	18	26	66	—	—	—	—	—
1972–73	Michigan Technological University	WCHA	36	11	16	27	85	—	—	—	—	—
1973–74	Michigan Technological University	WCHA	39	8	24	32	95	—	—	—	—	—
1974–75	Detroit Red Wings	NHL	1	0	0	0	0	—	—	—	—	—
1974–75	Virginia Wings	AHL	71	4	19	23	73	5	0	3	3	2
1975–76	Detroit Red Wings	NHL	3	0	1	1	0	—	—	—	—	—
1975–76	New Haven Nighthawks	AHL	49	4	11	15	74	—	—	—	—	—
1976–77	Detroit Red Wings	NHL	53	5	11	16	34	—	—	—	—	—
1976–77	Kansas City Blues	CHL	16	2	6	8	38	10	0	4	4	26
1977–78	Kansas City Red Wings	CHL	9	0	3	3	13	—	—	—	—	—
1977–78	Philadelphia Firebirds	AHL	69	8	22	30	147	4	0	1	1	4
AHL totals			189	16	52	68	294	9	0	4	4	6
NHL totals			57	5	12	17	34	—	—	—	—	—

== Head coaching record ==
Record table
Season	Team	Overall	Conference	Standing	Postseason
Michigan Tech Huskies (CCHA) (1982–1984)
1982–83	Michigan Tech	22–17–1	20–12–0	4th	CCHA Quarterfinals
1983–84	Michigan Tech	19–21–1	14–16–0	t-5th	CCHA Quarterfinals
Michigan Tech:		41–38–2	34–28–0		
Michigan Tech Huskies (WCHA) (1984–1985)
1984–85	Michigan Tech	15–24–1	13–20–1	8th	WCHA Quarterfinals
Michigan Tech:		15–24–1	13–20–1		
Total:		56–62–3			
National champion Postseason invitational champion Conference regular season champion Conference regular season and conference tournament champion Division regular season champion Division regular season and conference tournament champion Conference tournament champion

== Awards and honors ==
Award	Year
All-WCHA Second Team	1972–73
All-WCHA First Team	1973–74
AHCA West All-American	1973–74
All-NCAA All-Tournament Team	1974
