= Bruce Riutta =

American ice hockey player (1944–2012)

- Born: October 14, 1944 Hancock, Michigan, USA
- Died: January 24, 2012 (aged 67) Houston, Texas, USA
- Height: 6 ft 3 in (191 cm)
- Weight: 196 lb (89 kg; 14 st 0 lb)
- Position: Defence
- National team: United States
- Playing career: 1968–1975

Bruce Henry Riutta (October 14, 1944 – January 24, 2012) was an American ice hockey player. He competed at the 1968 Winter Olympics. He was also a member of the U.S. national team at the 1969, 1970 and 1971 ice hockey world championship tournaments.

== Awards and honors ==
Award	Year
All-WCHA First Team	1965–66
AHCA West All-American	1965–66
All-WCHA Second Team	1966–67
AHCA West All-American	1966–67
