= Gary Begg =

Canadian ice hockey player

- Born: December 29, 1940 (age 85) Moosomin, Saskatchewan, Canada
- Height: 6 ft 1 in (185 cm)
- Weight: 185 lb (84 kg; 13 st 3 lb)
- Position: Centre
- Played for: Toronto Marlboros
- National team: Canada
- Playing career: 1963–1969
Medal record
Representing Canada
Men's ice hockey
Ice Hockey World Championships
Bronze medal – third place	1966 Yugoslavia
Bronze medal – third place	1967 Austria

Gary Melvin Begg (born December 29, 1940) is a Canadian retired ice hockey centre and Olympian.

In the late 1950's, Begg started playing with the Toronto Marlboros. In 1960 he started playing at the Michigan Tech Huskies, and got inducted to the Huskies' Hall of Fame in 1997.

Begg played with Team Canada at the 1964 Winter Olympics held in Innsbruck, Austria. He became team captain for five years, and won bronze medals in the 1966 and 1967 World Ice Hockey Championships.

== Awards and honors ==
Award	Year
All-WCHA Second Team	1962–63
