= Garry Bauman =

Canadian ice hockey player

- Born: July 21, 1940 Innisfail, Alberta, Canada
- Died: October 16, 2006 (aged 66) Calgary, Alberta, Canada
- Height: 5 ft 11 in (180 cm)
- Weight: 175 lb (79 kg; 12 st 7 lb)
- Position: Goaltender
- Caught: Left
- Played for: 'Montreal Canadiens; Minnesota North Stars
- Playing career: 1964–1972

Garry Glenwood Bauman (July 21, 1940 – October 16, 2006) was a Canadian ice hockey goaltender who played 35 games in the National Hockey League with the Montreal Canadiens and Minnesota North Stars from 1967 to 1969. The rest of his career, which lasted from 1964 to 1972, was spent in various minor leagues.

== Playing career ==
Bauman and Montreal teammate Charlie Hodge shared goaltending duties in the 1967 NHL All-Star game, combining to record the first—and still only—shutout in the history of the event. It was one of only three games Bauman played with Montreal before being selected by the North Stars in the 1967 NHL Expansion Draft. He played parts of two seasons with the Stars, and then returned to Alberta to play for Calgary in the Alberta Senior League.

== Career statistics ==
=== Regular season and playoffs ===
			Regular season									Playoffs
Season	Team	League	GP	W	L	T	MIN	GA	SO	GAA	SV%	GP	W	L	MIN	GA	SO	GAA	SV%
1958–59	Prince Albert Mintos	SJHL	25	—	—	—	1500	104	0	4.16	—	4	—	—	240	10	0	2.50	—
1959–60	Prince Albert Mintos	SJHL	55	—	—	—	3320	212	4	3.83	—	7	—	—	420	28	0	4.00	—
1961–62	Michigan Tech	WCHA	25	24	1	0	1500	61	0	2.44	—	—	—	—	—	—	—	—	—
1962–63	Michigan Tech	WCHA	26	16	9	1	1560	70	3	2.69	—	—	—	—	—	—	—	—	—
1963–64	Michigan Tech	WCHA	24	12	12	0	1440	67	3	2.79	—	—	—	—	—	—	—	—	—
1964–65	Omaha Knights	CHL	43	22	16	5	2580	159	1	3.70	—	6	2	4	360	19	1	3.17	—
1965–66	Quebec Aces	AHL	52	36	11	4	3142	154	4	2.94	—	6	2	4	360	25	0	4.17	—
1966–67	Montreal Canadiens	NHL	2	1	1	0	120	5	0	2.50	.912	—	—	—	—	—	—	—	—
1966–67	Quebec Aces	AHL	40	21	15	4	2330	128	2	3.30	—	5	2	3	300	18	0	3.60	—
1967–68	Minnesota North Stars	NHL	26	4	13	5	1295	75	0	3.48	.886	—	—	—	—	—	—	—	—
1967–68	Rochester Americans	AHL	3	0	2	0	140	10	0	4.29	—	—	—	—	—	—	—	—	—
1968–69	Minnesota North Stars	NHL	7	0	3	1	300	22	0	4.41	.867	—	—	—	—	—	—	—	—
1968–69	Memphis South Stars	CHL	6	—	—	—	360	30	0	5.00	—	—	—	—	—	—	—	—	—
1971–72	Calgary Stampeders	ASHL	3	3	0	0	180	6	0	2.00	—	—	—	—	—	—	—	—	—
NHL totals			35	5	17	6	1714	102	0	3.57	.884	—	—	—	—	—	—	—	—

== Awards and honours ==
Award	Year
All-WCHA First Team	1961–62
NCAA All-Tournament Second Team	1962
All-WCHA First Team	1962–63
AHCA West All-American	1962–63
All-WCHA First Team	1963–64
AHCA West All-American	1963–64
