= John MacInnes (ice hockey) =

Canadian ice hockey player

Biographical details
- Born: July 21, 1925; Toronto, Ontario, Canada
- Died: March 6, 1983 (aged 57); Houghton, Michigan, U.S.
- Education: University of Michigan

Playing career
- 1945–1950: Michigan
- Position: Goaltender

Coaching career (HC unless noted)
- 1956–1982: Michigan Tech

Head coaching record
- Overall: 555–295–39 (.646)
- Tournaments: 12–8 (.600)

Accomplishments and honors

Championships
- 1960 WCHA Tournament champion 1962 WCHA regular season champion 1962 WCHA tournament champion 1962 NCAA National Champion; 1963 WCHA regular season champion 1963 WCHA tournament champion 1965 WCHA tournament champion 1965 NCAA national champion 1966 WCHA regular season champion 1969 WCHA regular season champion 1969 WCHA tournament champion 1970 WCHA tournament champion 1971 WCHA regular season champion 1974 WCHA regular season champion 1974 WCHA tournament champion 1975 WCHA tournament champion 1975 NCAA national champion 1976 WCHA regular season champion 1976 WCHA tournament champion

Awards
- 1960 WCHA Coach of the Year; 1962 WCHA Coach of the Year; 1966 WCHA Coach of the Year; 1970 Spencer Penrose Award; 1971 WCHA Coach of the Year; 1972 Upper Peninsula Hall of Fame; 1976 WCHA Coach of the Year; 1976 Spencer Penrose Award; 1984 Michigan Tech Sports Hall of Fame; 1986 Lester Patrick Trophy; 1999 Legends of College Hockey Award; 2007 United States Hockey Hall of Fame

John James MacInnes (July 1, 1925 – March 6, 1983) was a Canadian professional ice hockey goaltender and NCAA hockey head coach. He was born in Toronto, Ontario.

== Playing career ==
MacInnes was a goalie at the University of Michigan, helping the Wolverines to a pair of league titles and a third-place finish at the 1950 NCAA championship. MacInnes also played for farm teams of the Boston Bruins and the Detroit Red Wings before becoming director of the Ann Arbor Amateur Hockey League. He held that position until leaving to become head coach at Michigan Technological University.

== Coaching career ==
MacInnes was the head coach of the Michigan Tech Huskies from the 1956-57 season through 1981-82. His teams won three NCAA championships and seven Western Collegiate Hockey Association titles during his 26 seasons as head coach. He was named NCAA Coach of the Year twice, after the 1969–70 and 1975-76 seasons. He was also named WCHA Coach of the Year 5 times, in 1960, 1962, 1966, 1971 and 1976.

His record as Michigan Tech's coach was 555-295-39.

During his final season as coach MacInnes' health began to fail and he announced in February that he would be stepping down at the end of the season. Less than a year later he died at the age of 57.

== Head coaching record ==
Record table
Season	Team	Overall	Conference	Standing	Postseason
Michigan Tech Huskies (WIHL) (1956–1958)
1956–57	Michigan Tech	14–9–5	8–8–4	4th	
1957–58	Michigan Tech	11–16–1	5–15–0	7th	
Michigan Tech:		25–25–6	13–23–4		
Michigan Tech Huskies Independent (1958–1959)
1958–59	Michigan Tech	16–10–1			
Michigan Tech:		16–10–1			
Michigan Tech Huskies (WCHA) (1959–1981)
1959–60	Michigan Tech	21–10–1	15–6–1	2nd	NCAA runner-up
1960–61	Michigan Tech	16–13–0	13–11–0	4th	WCHA Finals
1961–62	Michigan Tech	29–3–0	17–3–0	1st	NCAA national champion
1962–63	Michigan Tech	17–10–2	11–7–2	3rd	WCHA Semifinals
1963–64	Michigan Tech	14–12–1	9–7–0	4th	WCHA Semifinals
1964–65	Michigan Tech	24–5–2	12–5–1	2nd	NCAA national champion
1965–66	Michigan Tech	23–6–1	15–4–1	1st	WCHA second round
1966–67	Michigan Tech	18–11–1	14–7–1	3rd	WCHA second round
1967–68	Michigan Tech	22–9–1	15–5–0	2nd	WCHA second round
1968–69	Michigan Tech	21–9–2	14–5–1	1st	NCAA consolation game (loss)
1969–70	Michigan Tech	19–12–3	12–7–3	t-2nd	NCAA consolation game (loss)
1970–71	Michigan Tech	25–6–2	18–4–0	1st	WCHA regional semifinals
1971–72	Michigan Tech	16–17–1	11–15–0	7th	WCHA first round
1972–73	Michigan Tech	24–13–1	16–10–0	5th	WCHA second round
1973–74	Michigan Tech	28–9–3	20–6–2	1st	NCAA runner-up
1974–75	Michigan Tech	32–10–0	22–10–0	2nd	NCAA national champion
1975–76	Michigan Tech	34–9–0	25–7–0	1st	NCAA runner-up
1976–77	Michigan Tech	19–18–1	15–16–1	6th	WCHA first round
1977–78	Michigan Tech	25–14–1	21–11–0	3rd	WCHA second round
1978–79	Michigan Tech	17–18–3	13–16–3	7th	WCHA first round
1979–80	Michigan Tech	18–18–2	12–14–2	7th	WCHA first round
1980–81	Michigan Tech	29–14–1	17–11–0	t-2nd	NCAA third-place game (win)
Michigan Tech:		491–246–29	337–187–18		
Michigan Tech Huskies (CCHA) (1981–1982)
1981–82	Michigan Tech	23–14–3	16–11–1	3rd	CCHA consolation game (loss)
Michigan Tech:		23–14–3	16–11–1		
Total:		555–295–39			
National champion Postseason invitational champion Conference regular season champion Conference regular season and conference tournament champion Division regular season champion Division regular season and conference tournament champion Conference tournament champion

== Honors and awards ==
- U.P. Sports Hall of Fame (Charter member, March 11, 1972)
- Great Lakes Invitational Trophy named after MacInnes (December 12, 1982)
- Michigan Tech Sports Hall of Fame (Charter member, 1984)
- Won NHL's Lester Patrick Trophy (January 7, 1986)
- Michigan Tech's Student Ice Arena renamed the John J. MacInnes Student Ice Arena (August 1991)
- Legend of College Hockey Award from Hobey Baker Committee (April 17, 1999)
- United States Hockey Hall of Fame (August 15, 2007)

== See also ==
- List of college men's ice hockey coaches with 400 wins
- University of Michigan Athletic Hall of Honor

Awards and achievements
Preceded by Award Created; Murray Armstrong; Bob Peters; Glen Sonmor; Jeff Sauer	WCHA Coach of the Year; 1959–60; 1961–62; 1965–66; 1970–71; 1975–76	Succeeded by Murray Armstrong; Barry Thorndycraft; Bill Selman; Jeff Sauer; Bob Johnson
Preceded by Charlie Holt; Jack Parker	Spencer Penrose Award; 1969–70; 1975–76	Succeeded by Cooney Weiland; Jerry York
Preceded by Ned Harkness	Hobey Baker Legends of College Hockey Award; 1999; With: Glen Sonmor	Succeeded by Bob Johnson
