= 1965–66 Michigan State Spartans men's ice hockey season =

National champion WCHA Tournament, co-champion 1966 NCAA Tournament, champion
- Conference: 6th WCHA / 2nd Big Ten
- Home ice: Demonstration Hall

Record
- Overall: 16–13–0
- Conference: 9–11, 4–4
- Home: 8–5
- Road: 5–8
- Neutral: 3–0

Coaches and captains
- Head coach: Amo Bessone
- Captain: Mike Coppo
- Alternate captain: Don Heaphy

The 1965–66 Michigan State Spartans men's ice hockey team represented Michigan State University in college ice hockey. In its 15th year under head coach Amo Bessone the team compiled a 16–13–0 record and reached the NCAA tournament for the second time in its history. The Spartans defeated Clarkson 6–1 in the championship game at the Williams Arena in Minneapolis, Minnesota. As of 2018, the 1965–66 Michigan State team has the worst record of any national champion for Division I (or equivalent) ice hockey.

== Season ==
Coming off of their first winning season in 3 years, Michigan State began the 1965–66 season on a sour note, losing both games at Colorado College and then continued their losing streak with the first two games of a three-game series against ECAC Hockey opponents. The Spartans finally earned a win against St. Lawrence to finish their road trip 1–4. State opened their home schedule against North Dakota with a split which continued with the succeeding two series against Denver and CC. MSU met their first Big Ten opponent when Minnesota arrived in mid-January but after the Golden Gophers handed Amo Bessone's team two losses the Spartans were wallowing near the bottom of their conference with a 3–7 record.

The only bright spot for MSU was that the WCHA had accepted Minnesota–Duluth into the conference and, as a result, changed the playoff format so all 8 teams would be included regardless of their records. MSU got back in the win column the following weekend against the Bulldogs, taking both games before travelling to Minneapolis to earn a split with the Gophers. MSU continued to slowly climb out of the cellar with two wins in their first home-and-home series with arch-rival Michigan and then extended their winning streak with two more wins against Wisconsin, bringing their all-time record against the Badgers to 6–0.

With a home playoff game in sight Michigan State was stopped dead in their tracks by defending national champion Michigan Tech who took two contests from the Spartans. MSU ended their regular season against Michigan with another home-and-home series but could only manage a split, finishing the season in 6th-place in the WCHA standings. Part of the rearrangement of the playoff system for the WCHA came with dividing the eight teams into two regions (east and west) with MSU being joined by Minnesota–Duluth, Michigan and Michigan Tech. Because Michigan had finished ahead of the Spartans (due to winning the final regular season game 1–0 in overtime), Michigan State had to open the conference tournament on the road. Despite the hostile crowd MSU was able to win the game against the 5th-place Wolverines and, because of an odd arrangement for the second round, headed back home for a match against top-seeded Michigan Tech. With the Spartan faithful cheering them on, Michigan State upset the Huskies 4–3, winning their first WCHA Tournament (shared with Denver) and advanced to their second NCAA Tournament.

Despite having a worse record than Denver, Michigan State was slated to play lower-seeded Boston University in the opening round, a team who was only in the tournament because ECAC runner-up Cornell declined the invitation. Michigan State's showed up in full force against the Terriers, holding BU to a single goal and winning a nail-biter 2–1 to advance to the title game. They met Clarkson for the championship, but unusually for an east-vs.-west matchup the two teams were familiar with one another with Clarkson having won a game early in the season. However, past was not prologue in this case and team captain Mike Coppo opened the scoring in the fifteenth minute of the opening frame. Clarkson tied the score just over three minutes later but that was the only goal they could get past Gaye Cooley and MSU began a string of five uninterrupted goals late in the second to win their first National championship.

Brian McAndrew, Mike Coppo, Don Heaphy and Gaye Cooley were all named to the All-Tournament first team while Bob Brawley and Tom Mikkola made the second team. Cooley was named Tournament Most Outstanding Player and, because of his job shepherding the Spartans through early-season injury and ice trouble, Amo Bessone shared the Spencer Penrose Award for national coach of the year with Clakrson's Len Ceglarski, the only time in history the award was split (as of 2018). The team's leading scorer, Doug Volmar was the only Spartan to be named to the AHCA All-American West Team or the All-WCHA First Team while none made it onto the WCHA Second Team.

== Standings ==
1965–66 Big Ten standings
	Conference							Overall					
	GP	W	L	T	PTS	GF	GA	GP	W	L	T	GF	GA
Minnesota†	8	5	3	0	10	34	29	27	16	11	0	117	94
Michigan State	8	4	4	0	8	34	32	29	16	13	0	123	111
Michigan	8	3	5	0	6	25	32	28	14	14	0	125	109
† indicates conference regular season champion

1965–66 Western Collegiate Hockey Association standings
	Conference							Overall					
	GP	W	L	T	PCT	GF	GA	GP	W	L	T	GF	GA
Michigan Tech†	20	15	4	1	.775	77	48	30	23	6	1	141	82
North Dakota	22	13	9	0	.591	97	85	30	17	12	1	135	115
Minnesota	22	13	9	0	.591	92	76	27	16	11	0	117	94
Denver*	20	10	7	3	.575	81	61	32	18	11	3	137	100
Michigan	18	9	9	0	.500	74	72	28	14	14	0	125	109
Michigan State*	20	9	11	0	.450	88	85	29	16	13	0	123	111
Colorado College	18	4	12	2	.278	51	93	29	9	18	2	98	147
Minnesota-Duluth	20	3	15	2	.200	60	100	28	7	19	2	96	137
Championship: Michigan State, Denver † indicates conference regular season champion * indicates conference tournament champion

== Schedule ==
Date	Opponent^{#}	Rank^{#}	Site	Result	Record
Regular Season
November 19	at Colorado College		Broadmoor World Arena • Colorado Springs, Colorado	L 0–4	0–1 (0–1)
November 20	at Colorado College		Broadmoor World Arena • Colorado Springs, Colorado	L 3–4 ^{OT}	0–2 (0–2)
November 25	at St. Lawrence*		Appleton Arena • Canton, New York	L 3–5	0–3 (0–2)
November 26	at Clarkson*		Walker Arena • Potsdam, New York	L 3–6	0–4 (0–2)
November 27	at St. Lawrence*		Appleton Arena • Canton, New York	W 6–4	1–4 (0–2)
December 3	vs. North Dakota		Demonstration Hall • East Lansing, Michigan	W 11–5	2–4 (1–2)
December 4	vs. North Dakota		Demonstration Hall • East Lansing, Michigan	L 3–5	2–5 (1–3)
December 10	vs. Denver		Demonstration Hall • East Lansing, Michigan	L 6–8	2–6 (1–4)
December 11	vs. Denver		Demonstration Hall • East Lansing, Michigan	W 4–1	3–6 (2–4)
January 7	vs. Colorado College		Demonstration Hall • East Lansing, Michigan	L 4–5 ^{OT}	3–7 (2–5)
January 8	vs. Colorado College		Demonstration Hall • East Lansing, Michigan	W 6–2	4–7 (3–5)
January 14	vs. Minnesota		Demonstration Hall • East Lansing, Michigan	L 5–7	4–8 (3–6, 0–1)
January 15	vs. Minnesota		Demonstration Hall • East Lansing, Michigan	L 1–5	4–9 (3–7, 0–2)
January 21	vs. Minnesota–Duluth		Demonstration Hall • East Lansing, Michigan	W 6–5 ^{OT}	5–9 (4–7, 0–2)
January 22	vs. Minnesota–Duluth		Demonstration Hall • East Lansing, Michigan	W 5–2	6–9 (5–7, 0–2)
January 28	vs. Minnesota		Williams Arena • Minneapolis, Minnesota	L 5–6 ^{OT}	6–10 (5–8, 0–3)
January 29	vs. Minnesota		Williams Arena • Minneapolis, Minnesota	W 4–3	7–10 (6–8, 1–3)
February 4	vs. Michigan		Demonstration Hall • East Lansing, Michigan	W 8–7	8–10 (7–8, 2–3)
February 5	at Michigan		Weinberg Coliseum • Ann Arbor, Michigan	W 4–2	9–10 (8–8, 3–3)
February 11	vs. Wisconsin*		Milwaukee Arena • Milwaukee, Wisconsin	W 3–1	10–10 (8–8, 3–3)
February 12	at Wisconsin*		Hartmeyer Ice Arena • Madison, Wisconsin	W 5–3	11–10 (8–8, 3–3)
February 18	at Michigan Tech		Dee Stadium • Houghton, Michigan	L 4–8	11–11 (8–9, 3–3)
February 19	at Michigan Tech		Dee Stadium • Houghton, Michigan	L 2–4	11–12 (8–10, 3–3)
February 25	vs. Michigan		Demonstration Hall • East Lansing, Michigan	W 7–1	12–12 (9–10, 4–3)
February 26	at Michigan		Weinberg Coliseum • Ann Arbor, Michigan	L 0–1 ^{OT}	12–13 (9–11, 4–4)
WCHA Tournament
March 3	at Michigan*		Weinberg Coliseum • Ann Arbor, Michigan (WCHA First Round)	W 3–2	13–13 (9–11, 4–4)
March 5	vs. Michigan Tech*		Demonstration Hall • East Lansing, Michigan (WCHA Second Round)	W 6–4	14–13 (9–11, 4–4)
NCAA Tournament
March 18	vs. Boston University*		Williams Arena • Minneapolis, Minnesota (National Semifinal)	W 2–1	15–13 (9–11, 4–4)
March 19	vs. Clarkson*		Williams Arena • Minneapolis, Minnesota (National championship)	W 6–1	16–13 (9–11, 4–4)
*Non-conference game. ^{#}Rankings from USCHO.com Poll. Source:

== Roster and scoring statistics ==
No.	Name	Year	Position	Hometown	S/P/C	Games	Goals	Assists	Pts	PIM
9	Doug Volmar	Junior	F	Cleveland Heights, OH	(Ohio)	29	26	28	54	57
7	Mike Coppo	Senior	F	Hancock, MI	(Michigan)	29	21	21	42	32
12	Brian McAndrew	Junior	F	Copper Cliff, ON	(Ontario)	29	14	23	37	20
20	Tom Mikkola	Junior	F	Copper Cliff, ON	(Ontario)	29	10	23	33	18
8	Bill Faunt	Junior	F	Sault Ste. Marie, ON	(Ontario)	29	8	23	31	6
10	Mike Jacobson	Junior	F	Copper Cliff, ON	(Ontario)	24	13	9	22	22
16	Bob Fallat	Sophomore	F	Espanola, ON	(Ontario)	29	11	5	16	36
4	Don Heaphy	Senior	D	Copper Cliff, ON	(Ontario)	29	3	10	13	44
15	Wayne Duffett	Sophomore	F	Kirkland Lake, ON	(Ontario)	29	5	7	12	14
14	Nino Cristofoli	Sophomore	F	Trail, BC	(British Columbia)	29	5	7	12	12
5	Tom Purdo	Junior	D	Detroit, MI	(Michigan)	28	1	7	8	57
3	Dick Bois	Sophomore	D	Espanola, ON	(Ontario)	27	2	3	5	50
11	Matt Mulcahy	Senior	F	Dearborn, MI	(Michigan)	29	2	3	5	4
2	Bob Brawley	Junior	D	Sault Ste. Marie, ON	(Ontario)	22	1	4	5	46
6	Doug French	Sophomore	D	Espanola, ON	(Ontario)	22	1	4	5	20
21	John Schuster	Junior	F	Wyandotte, MI	(Michigan)	23	0	1	1	0
18	Ron Roth	Junior	D	Saint Paul, MN	(Minnesota)	7	0	1	1	4
22	Larry Roche	Sophomore	G	Houghton, MI	(Michigan)	2	0	0	0	0
1	Jerry Fisher	Junior	G	Detroit, MI	(Michigan)	12	0	0	0	2
23	Gaye Cooley	Sophomore	G	North Bay, ON	(Ontario)	18	0	0	0	0
19	Dainis Vedejs	Senior	D	Grand Rapids, MI	(Michigan)	0	-	-	-	-
Total							123	179	302	454

== Goaltending statistics ==
No.	Name	Games	Minutes	Wins	Losses	Ties	Goals Against	Saves	Shut Outs	SV %	GAA
22	Larry Roche	2	–	–	–	–	–	–	0	.889	2.5
23	Gaye Cooley	18	–	–	–	–	–	–	0	.903	3.1
1	Jerry Fisher	12	–	–	–	–	–	–	0	.868	4.0
Total		29	–	16	13	0	111	–	0	–	–

== 1966 championship game ==
=== (E2) Clarkson vs. (W2) Michigan State ===
March 19	Clarkson	1 – 6	Michigan State	Williams Arena

Scoring summary
Period	Team	Goal	Assist(s)	Time	Score
1st	MSU	Mike Coppo	Heaphy	14:31	1–0 MSU
1st	CLK	Andrew Hamilton	McLennan and Hurley	17:54	1–1
2nd	MSU	Bob Brawley – GW	McAndrew and Heaphy	34:31	2–1 MSU
3rd	MSU	Mike Coppo	Faunt	40:17	3–1 MSU
3rd	MSU	Bob Fallat	McAndrew	43:38	4–1 MSU
3rd	MSU	Doug Volmar	Faunt	52:12	5–1 MSU
3rd	MSU	Bill Faunt	unassisted	59:32	6–1 MSU

Shots by period
Team	1	2	3	T
Clarkson				24
Michigan State			20	50

Goaltenders
Team	Name	Saves	Goals against	Time on ice
CLK	Terry Yurkiewicz	44	6	
MSU	Gaye Cooley	23	1	
