= 1964–65 Michigan Tech Huskies men's ice hockey season =

National champion WCHA Tournament, champion 1965 NCAA Tournament, champion
- Conference: 2nd WCHA
- Home ice: Dee Stadium

Record
- Overall: 24–5–2
- Conference: 12–5–1
- Home: 11–2–1
- Road: 11–3–1
- Neutral: 2–0–0

Coaches and captains
- Head coach: John MacInnes
- Captain: Al Holm
- Alternate captain(s): Pete Leiman; Rick Yeo

The 1964–65 Michigan Tech Huskies men's ice hockey team represented Michigan Tech University in college ice hockey. In its 9th year under head coach John MacInnes the team compiled a 24–5–1 record and reached the NCAA tournament for the fourth time in its history. The Huskies defeated Boston College 8–2 in the championship game at the Meehan Auditorium in Providence, Rhode Island.

== Season ==
With the last remnants of their first national championship team having graduated over the summer, John MacInnes moved Michigan Tech into a new era. With only six returning players from the year before, the Huskies were one of the least-experienced teams in the country (at last as far as college hockey) but the 1963 recruiting class would turn out to one of the best in history. With two good sophomore goaltenders to choose from, MacInnes decided to platoon his two netminders, allowing them to share the starting role and keep them well-rested throughout the season. With virtually no senior leadership on the team (both seniors were depth-players) all three captain roles were taken by juniors.

Michigan Tech began their season at home against Waterloo Lutheran (now called Wilfrid Laurier), winning both games easily, before travelling to Ontario to take on two senior teams and came away with two wins despite a scare in the second match. At the beginning of December MTU opened their conference schedule against North Dakota, taking both games against the Fighting Sioux and pushing their record to 6–0. Two weeks later the Huskies travelled to Grand Forks where UND repaid the favor by winning both of their home games to tie the two teams in the WCHA standings.

After the winter break Michigan Tech returned to the ice with pair of series against Minnesota–Duluth beginning with a road trip to Duluth. The Bulldog had been improving since becoming a top-tier program in 1961, producing their first winning campaign this season, but they were unable to stop the Huskies in any of the four games. The scored for all the matches were fairly close but MTU returned to their conference schedule with a 10–2 record, looking for a chance to head back to the NCAA Tournament.

Michigan Tech began a two-week road trip against Minnesota, splitting the series with the Golden Gophers, and ended by taking three points against last season's Runner-Up, Denver. MTU finished out the month of January at home against Michigan, but could only manage a split against the defending national champions. With a pedestrian 5–4–1 WCHA record Michigan Tech was in danger of dropping out of conference playoff contention and unless they finished in the top four in the conference they wouldn't have the change to make the NCAA Tournament.

MTU opened February with their 17th annual Winter Carnival, hosting Colorado College and winning two very important games. The next week they played host to Denver, who were themselves in danger of missing the WCHA Tournament, and earned a split with the Pioneers. Michigan Tech ended their regular season with another two-week road trip, playing both Michigan and Michigan State. While there was a chance that the Huskies could have been pushed out of the playoff picture at the outset, the Huskies took both games against the Spartans to guarantee themselves a postseason berth. While North Dakota was too far in front for them to catch, Michigan Tech could still gain home ice in the first round of the WCHA Tournament and with two wins against the Wolverines that's exactly what they did.

Michigan Tech opened their conference tournament against Minnesota with a 8–4 win, putting their opponents in a deep hole. The Huskies played safer in the second match, holding the Golden Gophers to 3 goals to earn a tie and win the total-goal series 11–7. The WCHA had changed the tournament schedule that year to have the championship game the week after the First Round rather than the day after. The extra time allowed Michigan Tech to rest and not have to rush 500 miles overnight so when they took on the Fighting Sioux they were ready for the fifth meeting between the two and were able to constrain one of the top offenses in the country to 4 goals while scoring s times themselves to win their second WCHA championship. Because the WCHA would change the playoff format the following season, Michigan Tech was the last solitary tournament champion for twelve seasons and were the last program to win the MacNaughton Cup as the postseason champion (the trophy would revert to a regular season championship trophy in 1966).

As the WCHA Champion Michigan Tech was given the top western seed and opened the 1965 NCAA Tournament as the home team despite playing in the home building of their opponent, Brown. The Huskies didn't give the partisan crowd much to cheer about, scoring twice in the first while holding the Bears to 8 shots. Rick Best held Brown scoreless for the entire game, earning the first ever shutout in tournament history while Senior Fred Dart scored twice to send MTU to their fourth championship game. Despite the shutout, MacInnes continued his goaltender rotation and put future Hall of Famer Tony Esposito in net against ECAC champion Boston College and, while Tony O kept BC off the scoresheet until late in the second, the Huskies as a whole were more than a match for the Eagles. Michigan Tech set a new championship record by scoring the first six goals of the game, a mark that has only been equaled one other time (by Michigan Tech in 1975) as of 2018. Five players combined for the six goals with only tournament MOP Gary Milroy scoring twice. BC's first goal came on a 5-on-3 power play but the game was in hand by that point and the two teams played out the final period without too much fanfare as MTU won the national championship.

Due to their thoroughly dominating performance in the two games, Michigan Tech tied a record by placing five players on the All-Tournament first team: Tony Esposito, Dennis Huculak, Pete Leiman, Gary Milroy and Wayne Weller. Only Esposito was named to AHCA All-American West Team and the All-WCHA First Team while Huculak and Milroy made the WCHA Second Team. Milroy finished second on the team in scoring, behind fellow sophomore Wayne Weller, and was named as the WCHA Sophomore of the Year.

== Standings ==
1964–65 Western Collegiate Hockey Association standings
	Conference							Overall					
	GP	W	L	T	PCT	GF	GA	GP	W	L	T	GF	GA
North Dakota†	16	13	3	0	.813	75	48	33	25	8	0	184	106
Michigan Tech*	18	12	5	1	.694	78	47	31	24	5	2	153	82
Minnesota	18	10	8	0	.556	86	78	28	14	12	2	137	121
Michigan State	14	7	7	0	.500	69	61	29	17	12	0	165	118
Michigan	18	7	11	0	.389	68	94	26	13	12	1	110	122
Denver	12	4	7	1	.375	34	37	28	18	8	2	144	74
Colorado College	16	2	14	0	.125	51	96	25	7	17	1	96	132
Championship: Michigan Tech † indicates conference regular season champion * indicates conference tournament champion

== Schedule ==
Date	Opponent^{#}	Rank^{#}	Site	Result	Record
Regular Season
November 20	vs. Waterloo Lutheran*		Dee Stadium • Houghton, Michigan	W 6–1	1–0
November 21	vs. Waterloo Lutheran*		Dee Stadium • Houghton, Michigan	W 9–3	2–0
November 25	at Port Arthur Bearcats*		Port Arthur, Ontario	W 8–3	3–0
November 27	at Red Rock Royals*		Red Rock, Ontario	W 4–3	4–0
December 4	vs. North Dakota		Dee Stadium • Houghton, Michigan	W 3–2 ^{OT}	5–0 (1–0)
December 5	vs. North Dakota		Dee Stadium • Houghton, Michigan	W 5–2	6–0 (2–0)
December 18	at North Dakota		Winter Sports Building • Grand Forks, North Dakota	L 1–2	6–1 (2–1)
December 19	at North Dakota		Winter Sports Building • Grand Forks, North Dakota	L 3–6	6–2 (2–2)
January 1	at Minnesota–Duluth*		Duluth Curling and Skating Club • Duluth, Minnesota	W 6–3	7–2 (2–2)
January 2	at Minnesota–Duluth*		Duluth Curling and Skating Club • Duluth, Minnesota	W 4–3	8–2 (2–2)
January 8	vs. Minnesota–Duluth*		Dee Stadium • Houghton, Michigan	W 4–2	9–2 (2–2)
January 9	vs. Minnesota–Duluth*		Dee Stadium • Houghton, Michigan	W 5–4	10–2 (2–2)
January 15	at Minnesota		Williams Arena • Minneapolis, Minnesota	W 4–1	11–2 (3–2)
January 16	at Minnesota		Williams Arena • Minneapolis, Minnesota	L 4–5	11–3 (3–3)
January 22	at Denver		DU Arena • Denver, Colorado	W 3–2	12–3 (4–3)
January 23	at Denver		DU Arena • Denver, Colorado	T 3–3 ^{OT}	12–3–1 (4–3–1)
January 29	vs. Michigan		Dee Stadium • Houghton, Michigan	W 10–2	13–3–1 (5–3–1)
January 30	vs. Michigan		Dee Stadium • Houghton, Michigan	L 1–2	13–4–1 (5–4–1)
February 5	vs. Colorado College		Dee Stadium • Houghton, Michigan (Winter Carnival)	W 3–1	14–4–1 (6–4–1)
February 6	vs. Colorado College		Dee Stadium • Houghton, Michigan (Winter Carnival)	W 10–1	15–4–1 (7–4–1)
February 12	vs. Denver		Dee Stadium • Houghton, Michigan	L 1–3	15–5–1 (7–5–1)
February 13	vs. Denver		Dee Stadium • Houghton, Michigan	W 3–0	16–5–1 (8–5–1)
February 19	at Michigan State		Demonstration Hall • East Lansing, Michigan	W 4–3	17–5–1 (9–5–1)
February 20	at Michigan State		Demonstration Hall • East Lansing, Michigan	W 5–4	18–5–1 (10–5–1)
February 26	at Michigan		Weinberg Coliseum • Ann Arbor, Michigan	W 7–2	19–5–1 (11–5–1)
February 27	at Michigan		Weinberg Coliseum • Ann Arbor, Michigan	W 8–2	20–5–1 (12–5–1)
WCHA Tournament
March 5	vs. Minnesota*		Weinberg Coliseum • Ann Arbor, Michigan (WCHA First Round Game 1)	W 8–4	21–5–1 (12–5–1)
March 6	vs. Minnesota*		Weinberg Coliseum • Ann Arbor, Michigan (WCHA First Round Game 2)	T 3–3	21–5–2 (12–5–1)
March 13	at North Dakota*		Winter Sports Building • Grand Forks, North Dakota (WCHA championship)	W 6–4	22–5–2 (12–5–1)
NCAA Tournament
March 18	vs. Brown*		Meehan Auditorium • Providence, Rhode Island (National Semifinal)	W 4–0	23–5–2 (12–5–1)
March 20	vs. Boston College*		Meehan Auditorium • Providence, Rhode Island (National championship)	W 8–2	24–5–2 (12–5–1)
*Non-conference game. ^{#}Rankings from USCHO.com Poll. Source:

== Roster and scoring statistics ==
No.	Name	Year	Position	Hometown	S/P/C	Games	Goals	Assists	Pts	PIM
12	Wayne Weller	Sophomore	F	Toronto, ON	(Ontario)	31	24	23	47	28
14	Gary Milroy	Sophomore	C	Toronto, ON	(Ontario)	29	17	29	46	8
20	Al Holm	Junior	F	Rossland, BC	(British Columbia)	31	20	21	41	32
9	Rick Yeo	Junior	F	Port Arthur, ON	(Ontario)	31	19	15	34	10
18	Colin Patterson	Sophomore	F	Kimberley, BC	(British Columbia)	31	11	19	30	12
7	Bob Toothill	Sophomore	F	Winnipeg, MB	(Manitoba)	30	14	13	27	23
15	Bob Wilson	Sophomore	F	Toronto, ON	(Ontario)	31	12	12	24	10
8	Steve Yoshino	Sophomore	F	Winnipeg, MB	(Manitoba)	31	8	14	22	6
6	Pete Leiman	Junior	D	Cranbrook, BC	(British Columbia)	29	5	15	20	71
3	Dennis Huculak	Sophomore	D	Edmonton, AB	(Alberta)	31	4	16	20	34
11	Fred Dart	Senior	F	Lindsay, ON	(Ontario)	23	9	9	18	8
4	Terry Ryan	Junior	D	Kirkland Lake, ON	(Ontario)	31	1	15	16	82
5	Bruce Riutta	Sophomore	D	Hancock, MI	(Michigan)	31	2	12	14	12
19	Ed Caterer	Sophomore	F	Toronto, ON	(Ontario)	31	4	2	6	14
11	Dave Confrey	Sophomore	F	Winnipeg, MB	(Manitoba)	16	2	0	2	6
17	Bob Brooks	Sophomore	W	Winnipeg, MB	(Manitoba)	4	1	0	1	0
16	Roy Heino	Senior	F	Port Huron, MI	(Michigan)	5	0	1	1	0
21	Tom Steele	Sophomore	D	New Liskeard, ON	(Ontario)	5	0	1	1	2
2	Mike Gorman	Sophomore	D	Houghton, MI	(Michigan)	16	0	1	1	16
10	Joe Galetto	Sophomore	F	Laurium, MI	(Michigan)	1	0	0	0	0
1	Rick Best	Sophomore	G	Winnipeg, MB	(Manitoba)	14	–	–	–	–
1	Tony Esposito	Sophomore	G	Sault Ste. Marie, ON	(Ontario)	17	–	–	–	–
Total							153	218	371	374

== Goaltending statistics ==
No.	Name	Games	Minutes	Wins	Losses	Ties	Goals Against	Saves	Shut Outs	SV %	GAA
1	Tony Esposito	17	1021	–	–	–	40	415	1	.912	2.35
1	Rick Best	14	840	–	–	–	42	350	1	.893	3.00
Total		31	–	24	5	1	82	–	0	–	–

== 1965 championship game ==
=== E1 Boston College vs. W1 Michigan Tech ===
March 20	Boston College	2 – 8	Michigan Tech	Meehan Auditorium

Scoring summary
Period	Team	Goal	Assist(s)	Time	Score
1st	MTU	Gary Milroy	Weller	7:28	1–0 MTU
1st	MTU	Wayne Weller	Milroy and Holm	13:12	2–0 MTU
1st	MTU	Bob Wilson – GW PP	Leiman and Yeo	18:56	3–0 MTU
2nd	MTU	Colin Patterson	Wilson and Yeo	22:13	4–0 MTU
2nd	MTU	Fred Dart	Yoshino and Toothill	23:37	5–0 MTU
2nd	MTU	Gary Milroy – PP	Riutta and Huculak	34:58	6–0 MTU
2nd	BC	E. J. Breen – PP	Toran	37:24	6–1 MTU
2nd	MTU	Wayne Weller	Milroy	39:26	7–1 MTU
3rd	BC	Jim Mullen	Dyer and Dunniff	46:02	7–2 MTU
3rd	MTU	Bob Wilson	unassisted	57:58	8–2 MTU
Penalty summary
Period	Team	Player	Penalty	Time	PIM
1st	MTU	Terry Ryan	Holding	6:00	2:00
1st	BC	John Moylan	Cross–Checking	6:00	2:00
1st	MTU	Colin Patterson	Cross–Checking	8:47	2:00
1st	MTU	Ed Caterer	Tripping	10:52	2:00
1st	BC	Woody Johnson	Elbowing	16:57	2:00
2nd	BC	Francis Kearns	Interference	24:02	2:00
2nd	MTU	Dennis Huculak	Holding	32:04	2:00
2nd	BC	Jim Mullen	Illegal Check	34:23	2:00
2nd	MTU	Gary Milroy	Slashing	36:06	2:00
2nd	MTU	David Confrey	Charging	36:41	2:00
2nd	MTU	Wayne Weller	Tripping	39:32	2:00
2nd	MTU	Al Holm	Roughing	39:32	2:00
2nd	BC	Woody Johnson	Roughing	39:32	2:00
3rd	BC	Ralphy Toran	Slashing	42:08	2:00
3rd	BC	Francis Kearns	Elbowing	50:47	2:00
3rd	MTU	Dennis Huculak	Slashing	50:47	2:00
3rd	MTU	Terry Ryan	Tripping	54:17	2:00

Shots by period
Team	1	2	3	T
Boston College	5	11	11	27
Michigan Tech	10	14	11	35

Goaltenders
Team	Name	Saves	Goals against	Time on ice
BC	Pat Murphy	27	8	
MTU	Tony Esposito	27	2	
