= 1966 NCAA University Division men's ice hockey tournament =

College ice hockey tournament

- Teams: 4
- Finals site: Williams Arena, Minneapolis, Minnesota
- Champions: Michigan State Spartans (1st title)
- Runner-up: Clarkson Golden Knights (2nd title game)
- Semifinalists: Denver Pioneers (6th Frozen Four); Boston University Terriers (5th Frozen Four)
- Winning coach: Amo Bessone (1st title)
- MOP: Gaye Cooley (Michigan State)
- Attendance: 9,063

The 1966 NCAA Men's University Division Ice Hockey Tournament was the culmination of the 1965–66 NCAA University Division men's ice hockey season, the 19th such tournament in NCAA history. It was held between March 17 and 19, 1966, and concluded with Michigan State defeating Clarkson 6–1. All games were played at the Williams Arena in Minneapolis, Minnesota.

== Qualifying teams ==
Four teams qualified for the tournament, two each from the eastern and western regions. The ECAC tournament champion and the two WCHA tournament co-champions received automatic bids into the tournament. An at-large bid was offered to a second eastern team based upon both their ECAC tournament finish as well as their regular season record.

| East | | | | | | | West | | | | | | |
| Seed | School | Conference | Record | Berth type | Appearance | Last bid | Seed | School | Conference | Record | Berth type | Appearance | Last bid |
|---|---|---|---|---|---|---|---|---|---|---|---|---|---|
| 1 | Boston University | ECAC Hockey | 27–6–0 | At-Large | 5th | 1960 | 1 | Denver | WCHA | 17–10–3 | Tournament co-champion | 6th | 1964 |
| 2 | Clarkson | ECAC Hockey | 23–2–0 | Tournament champion | 5th | 1963 | 2 | Michigan State | WCHA | 14–13–0 | Tournament co-champion | 2nd | 1959 |

== Format ==
Despite winning the tournament the ECAC champion was not seeded as the top eastern team; this occurred because the at-large team played and won more games, both in conference and overall. The WCHA co-champion with the better regular season record was given the top western seed. The second eastern seed was slotted to play the top western seed and vice versa. All games were played at the Williams Arena. All matches were Single-game eliminations with the semifinal winners advancing to the national championship game and the losers playing in a consolation game.

== Bracket ==
Semifinals; March 17–18
W1 | Denver | 3
E2 | Clarkson | 4
E1 | Boston University | 1
W2 | Michigan State | 2

National championship March 19
E2 | Clarkson | 1
W2 | Michigan State | 6
Third-place game
W1 | Denver | 4
E1 | Boston University | 3

Note: * denotes overtime period(s)

=== Semifinals ===
==== (W1) Denver vs. (E2) Clarkson ====
| March 17 | Denver | 3 – 4 | Clarkson | Williams Arena | Recap |
| No scoring | | First period | 14:17 - Tom Hurley (McLennan) |
| (Shires, Wiste) Wayne Smith - PP - 04:09 (Bradley, James) Louis Geddes - 05:54 | | Second period | 16:09 - Fred Silver (McLennan) |
| (Peers) Don Cameron - 03:54 | | Third period | 07:51 - Tom Hurley (McLennan); 15:54 - GW - John McLennan (Patterson, Hurley) |
| (20 saves) Buddy Blom | | Goalie stats | Terry Yurkiewicz (21 saves) |

==== (E1) Boston University vs. (W2) Michigan State ====
| March 18 | Boston University | 1 – 2 | Michigan State | Williams Arena |
| No Scoring | | First period | No Scoring |
| No Scoring | | Second period | 15:20 - Doug French (unassisted) |
| (O'Connell, Finnie) Pete McLachlan - 17:58 | | Third period | 12:21 - GW - Doug Volmar (Brawley, Faunt) |
| (27 saves) Jack Ferreira | | Goalie stats | Gaye Cooley (24 saves) |

=== Consolation Game ===
==== (W1) Denver vs. (E1) Boston University ====
| March 19 | Denver | 4 – 3 | Boston University | Williams Arena | Recap |
| (Padzerski, Bradley) Wayne Smith - PP - 19:13 | | First period | No scoring |
| No scoring | | Second period | 06:27 - PP - Brian Gilmour (Quinn, McLachlan) |
| (Geddes, Padzerski) Jim Shires - 02:14 (Koroll, Padzerski) Lyle Bradley - 05:33 (Shires) Jim Wiste - GW - 06:46 | | Third period | 07:07 - Fred Bassi (Quinn); 13:50 - Jim Quinn (Bassi) |
| (26 saves) Buddy Blom | | Goalie stats | Jack Ferreira (5 saves); Wayne Ryan (13 saves) |

=== (E2) Clarkson vs. (W2) Michigan State ===
| March 19 | Clarkson | 1 – 6 | Michigan State | Williams Arena |

Scoring summary
| Period | Team | Goal | Assist(s) | Time | Score |
|---|---|---|---|---|---|
| 1st | MSU | Mike Coppo – PP | Heaphy | 14:31 | 1–0 MSU |
| 1st | CLK | Andrew Hamilton – PP | McLennan and Hurley | 17:54 | 1–1 |
| 2nd | MSU | Bob Brawley – GW | McAndrew and Heaphy | 34:31 | 2–1 MSU |
| 3rd | MSU | Mike Coppo | Faunt | 40:17 | 3–1 MSU |
| 3rd | MSU | Bob Fallat | McAndrew | 43:38 | 4–1 MSU |
| 3rd | MSU | Doug Volmar | Faunt | 52:12 | 5–1 MSU |
| 3rd | MSU | Bill Faunt – PP | unassisted | 59:32 | 6–1 MSU |
Penalty summary
| Period | Team | Player | Penalty | Time | PIM |
| 1st | CLK | Jack Levitt | Interference | 7:09 | 2:00 |
| 1st | CLK | Joe Demerski | Boarding | 7:09 | 2:00 |
| 1st | CLK | Gerry Kovolchuk | Cross-checking | 13:48 | 2:00 |
| 1st | MSU | Tom Purdo | Cross-checking | 16:06 | 2:00 |
| 1st | CLK | Brian Dooling | Misconduct – shooting puck after whistle | 16:09 | 10:00 |
| 1st | MSU | Don Heaphy | Interference | 17:20 | 2:00 |
| 1st | CLK | Jack Levitt | Illegal checking | 18:14 | 2:00 |
| 2nd | CLK | Tom Hurley | Tripping | 24:47 | 2:00 |
| 2nd | MSU | Mike Coppo | Tripping | 25:44 | 2:00 |
| 2nd | MSU | Dick Bois | Hooking | 28:43 | 2:00 |
| 2nd | CLK | Andrew Hamilton | Roughing | 33:16 | 2:00 |
| 2nd | MSU | Doug Volmar | Roughing | 33:16 | 2:00 |
| 2nd | CLK | John McLennan | Hooking | 34:42 | 2:00 |
| 2nd | MSU | Dick Bois | Cross-checking | 37:58 | 2:00 |
| 3rd | CLK | Harry Dunn | Interference | 41:35 | 2:00 |
| 3rd | CLK | Jack Levitt | Slashing | 47:23 | 2:00 |
| 3rd | CLK | John McLennan | Elbowing | 47:53 | 2:00 |
| 3rd | CLK | Bench | Too many men | 49:03 | 2:00 |
| 3rd | CLK | Gerry Kovolchuk | Slashing | 58:11 | 2:00 |

Shots by period
| Team | 1 | 2 | 3 | T |
|---|---|---|---|---|
| Clarkson | 8 | 13 | 4 | 25 |
| Michigan State | 17 | 9 | 20 | 46 |

Goaltenders
| Team | Name | Saves | Goals against | Time on ice |
|---|---|---|---|---|
| CLK | Terry Yurkiewicz | 40 | 6 | |
| MSU | Gaye Cooley | 24 | 1 | |

== All-Tournament team ==
=== First Team ===
- G: Gaye Cooley* (Michigan State)
- D: Don Heaphy (Michigan State)
- D: Wayne Smith (Denver)
- F: Mike Coppo (Michigan State)
- F: Tom Hurley (Clarkson)
- F: Brian McAndrew (Michigan State)

* Most Outstanding Player(s)

=== Second Team ===
- G: Terry Yurkiewicz (Clarkson)
- D: Pete McLachlan (Boston University)
- D: Bob Brawley (Michigan State)
- F: Tom Mikkola (Michigan State)
- F: John McLennan (Clarkson)
- F: Lyle Bradley (Denver)
