= 1966 WCHA men's ice hockey tournament =

1966 WCHA Men's ice hockey tournament
- Dates: March 3–5, 1966
- Teams: 8
- Finals site: Dee Stadium; Houghton, Michigan; DU Arena; Denver, Colorado
- Champions: Michigan State† (1st title); Denver‡ (5th title)
- Winning coach: Amo Bessone (1st title); Murray Armstrong (5th title)
- WCHA Men's Ice Hockey Tournaments

The 1966 WCHA Men's Ice Hockey Tournament was the 7th conference playoff in league history. The tournament was played between March 3 and March 5, 1966. All games were played at home team campus sites. By being declared as co-champions, both Michigan State and Denver were invited to participate in the 1966 NCAA University Division Men's Ice Hockey Tournament.

Though not official designations, Michigan State is considered as the East Regional Champion† and Denver as the West Regional Champion‡.

== Format ==
All eight teams in the WCHA were eligible for the tournament. In the first round the schools were matched up based upon regional location, having the schools closest to one another play a single game with the winners advancing to the second round. The two Colorado schools (Colorado College and Denver) met in one match, leaving North Dakota to play their closest geographic rival Minnesota. With the Gophers occupied Minnesota-Duluth's next closest opponent was Michigan Tech, leaving Michigan and Michigan State as the pair in the final First Round game. This format was to be used for the following season as well with each team in the first round matches serving as the home team once. Denver was the only higher seed to play a road game in the first round but was guaranteed to be the home team the following season. After the first round the two easternmost remaining teams met in the home venues of Michigan Tech (Dee Stadium) while the two westernmost schools met at Denver's home building (DU Arena). In the second round the first and fourth seeds and the second and third seeds were matched with the winners being declared as co-conference tournament champions.

=== Conference standings ===
Note: GP = Games played; W = Wins; L = Losses; T = Ties; PCT = Winning percentage; GF = Goals for; GA = Goals against

1965–66 Western Collegiate Hockey Association standings
	Conference							Overall					
	GP	W	L	T	PCT	GF	GA	GP	W	L	T	GF	GA
Michigan Tech†	20	15	4	1	.775	77	48	30	23	6	1	141	82
North Dakota	22	13	9	0	.591	97	85	30	17	12	1	135	115
Minnesota	22	13	9	0	.591	92	76	27	16	11	0	117	94
Denver*	20	10	7	3	.575	81	61	32	18	11	3	137	100
Michigan	18	9	9	0	.500	74	72	28	14	14	0	125	109
Michigan State*	20	9	11	0	.450	88	85	29	16	13	0	123	111
Colorado College	18	4	12	2	.278	51	93	29	9	18	2	98	147
Minnesota-Duluth	20	3	15	2	.200	60	100	28	7	19	2	96	137
Championship: Michigan State, Denver † indicates conference regular season champion * indicates conference tournament champion

== Bracket ==
Eastern Teams advanced to one final while western teams advanced to the other

First Round; March 3
1	Michigan Tech	9
8	Minnesota-Duluth	3
2	North Dakota	4
3	Minnesota	3
4	Denver	8
7	Colorado College	2
5	Michigan	2
6	Michigan State	3

Second Round; March 5
2	North Dakota	4
4	Denver	5*
1	Michigan Tech	3
6	Michigan State	4

Note: * denotes overtime period(s)

=== First round ===
==== (1) Michigan Tech vs. (8) Minnesota-Duluth ====
March 3	Michigan Tech	9 – 3	Minnesota-Duluth	Dee Stadium

==== (2) North Dakota vs. (3) Minnesota ====
March 3	North Dakota	4 – 3	Minnesota	Winter Sports Building

==== (4) Denver vs. (7) Colorado College ====
March 3	Colorado College	2 – 8	Denver	Broadmoor World Arena

==== (5) Michigan vs. (6) Michigan State ====
March 3	Michigan	2 – 3	Michigan State	Weinberg Coliseum

=== Second round ===
==== (1) Michigan Tech vs. (6) Michigan State ====
March 5	Michigan Tech	3 – 4	Michigan State	Demonstration Hall

==== (2) North Dakota vs. (4) Denver ====
March 5	Denver	5 – 4	OT	North Dakota	DU Arena

== Tournament awards ==
None

== See also ==
- Western Collegiate Hockey Association men's champions
