= 1966 ECAC Hockey men's ice hockey tournament =

1966 ECAC Men's ice hockey tournament
- Dates: March 8–12, 1966
- Teams: 8
- Finals site: Boston Arena; Boston, Massachusetts
- Champions: Clarkson (1st title)
- Winning coach: Len Ceglarski (1st title)
- MVP: Terry Yurkiewicz (Clarkson)
- ECAC Men's Ice Hockey Tournaments

The 1966 ECAC Hockey Men's Ice Hockey Tournament was the 5th tournament in league history. It was played between March 8 and March 12, 1966. Quarterfinal games were played at home team campus sites, while the 'final four' games were played at the Boston Arena in Boston, Massachusetts. By reaching the championship game Clarkson was indeed invited to participate in the 1966 NCAA University Division Men's Ice Hockey Tournament. As runner-up, Cornell received the second bid to the tournament, however, due to a disagreement between the Ivy League and the NCAA on postseason participation the Big Red declined the invitation and were replaced by Boston University.

== Format ==
The tournament featured three rounds of play, all of which were single-elimination. The top eight teams, based on conference rankings, qualified to participate in the tournament. In the quarterfinals the first seed and eighth seed, the second seed and seventh seed, the third seed and sixth seed and the fourth seed and fifth seed played against one another. In the semifinals, the winner of the first and eighth matchup played the winner of the fourth and fifth matchup while the other two remaining teams played with the winners advancing to the championship game and the losers advancing to the third place game.

== Conference standings ==
Note: GP = Games played; W = Wins; L = Losses; T = Ties; Pct. = Winning percentage; GF = Goals for; GA = Goals against

1965–66 ECAC Hockey standings
	Conference							Overall					
	GP	W	L	T	Pct.	GF	GA	GP	W	L	T	GF	GA
Clarkson†*	12	11	1	0	.917	67	28	27	24	3	0	150	70
Boston University	19	17	2	0	.895	105	75	35	27	8	0	178	92
Cornell	18	16	2	0	.889	92	33	27	22	5	0	151	54
Brown	18	12	6	0	.667	86	60	25	16	9	0	114	85
St. Lawrence	15	8	6	1	.567	75	54	24	15	8	1	130	95
Boston College	22	12	10	0	.545	105	80	28	16	12	0	135	101
Colgate	16	8	7	1	.531	79	67	26	14	11	1	137	98
Northeastern	18	9	8	1	.528	80	71	29	16	12	1	140	120
Harvard	19	8	11	0	.421	77	81	23	10	12	1	104	99
Yale	21	8	12	1	.405	82	103	23	10	12	1	86	105
Army	10	3	6	1	.350	34	69	25	17	7	1	132	85
Princeton	19	6	12	1	.342	76	101	20	7	12	1	76	101
Dartmouth	18	2	14	2	.167	55	111	24	5	17	2	80	127
Providence	14	2	12	0	.143	42	77	21	7	14	0	77	93
Rensselaer	13	0	13	0	.000	18	112	22	3	19	0	42	161
Championship: Clarkson † indicates conference regular season champion * indicates conference tournament champion

== Bracket ==
Quarterfinals; March 8
1	Clarkson	5
8	Colgate	2
4	Brown	4
5	St. Lawrence	2
2	Boston University	4
7	Northeastern	1
3	Cornell	9
6	Boston College	0

Semifinals; March 11
1	Clarkson	2
4	Brown	1
2	Boston University	1
3	Cornell	8

Championship; March 12
1	Clarkson	6
3	Cornell	2
Third place
2	Boston University	5
4	Brown	2

Note: * denotes overtime period(s)

=== Quarterfinals ===
==== (1) Clarkson vs. (8) Colgate ====
March 8	Clarkson	5 – 2	Colgate	Clarkson Arena

==== (2) Boston University vs. (7) Northeastern ====
March 8	Boston University	4 – 1	Northeastern	Boston Arena

==== (3) Cornell vs. (6) Boston College ====
March 8	Cornell	9 – 0	Boston College	Lynah Rink

==== (4) Brown vs. (5) St. Lawrence ====
March 8	Brown	4 – 2	St. Lawrence	Meehan Auditorium

=== Semifinals ===
==== (1) Clarkson vs. (4) Brown ====
March 11	Clarkson	2 – 1	Brown	Boston Arena

==== (2) Boston University vs. (3) Cornell ====
March 11	Boston University	1 – 8	Cornell	Boston Arena

=== Third Place ===
==== (2) Boston University vs. (4) Brown ====
March 12	Boston University	5 – 2	Brown	Boston Arena

=== Championship ===
==== (1) Clarkson vs. (3) Cornell ====
March 12	Clarkson	6 – 2	Cornell	Boston Arena

== Tournament awards ==
=== All-Tournament Team ===
==== First Team ====
- F Harry Dunn (Clarkson)
- F Tom Hurley (Clarkson)
- F Doug Ferguson (Cornell)
- D Harry Orr (Cornell)
- D Bob Gaudreau (Brown)
- G Terry Yurkiewicz* (Clarkson)

* Most Outstanding Player(s)

==== Second Team ====
- F Mike Doran (Cornell)
- F Fred Bassi (Boston University)
- F Dave Ferguson (Cornell)
- D Tom Ross (Boston University)
- D Gary Patterson (Clarkson)
- G Dave Ferguson (Brown)
