= Gary Milroy =

Canadian ice hockey player (born 1943)

- Born: December 24, 1943 (age 82) Toronto, Ontario, Canada
- Height: 5 ft 10 in (178 cm)
- Weight: 165 lb (75 kg; 11 st 11 lb)
- Position: Center
- Played for: Toronto Marlboros; Phoenix Roadrunners (WHL); Orillia Terriers; Whitby McDonalds
- NHL draft: Undrafted
- Playing career: 1961–1977

Gary Milroy is a retired Canadian ice hockey player. He helped Michigan Tech win their second National Title in 1965, earning Tournament MOP honors and receiving the WCHA Sophomore of the Year

== Career ==
Milroy played for the Toronto Marlboros in the early 1960s before being recruited to play for Michigan Tech by head coach John MacInnes. Milroy was part of a huge recruiting class, being one of sixteen sophomores to debut in the 1964–65 season for the Huskies and one of four players hailing from Toronto. Milroy was an instant success with MTU, finishing second on the team in scoring in his rookie season by a single point behind fellow sophomore Wayne Weller. Milroy was named the WCHA Sophomore of the Year, the third Tech player so honored, and named to the All-WCHA Second Team.

Milroy kept his stellar play going in the postseason, helping Michigan Tech win the WCHA Tournament and receive the #1 seed in the 1965 NCAA Tournament. MTU opened against a comparably weaker Brown squad and posted the championships first ever shutout victory with Milroy providing a goal and an assist in the game. In the championship game against Boston College Milroy opened the scoring at 7:28 of the first period and by the time he scored his second goal (a power play marker late in the second period) the Huskies possessed a 6–0 lead, a new NCAA record for the most consecutive goals scored from the start of a championship game. BC finally made it onto the scoresheet while Milroy was serving a slashing penalty but the game was well in hand and MTU coasted to a 8–2 victory. Milroy added two assists in the title game to bring his total up to 4 points (tied for 9th all-time with many others) and 6 points for the tournament, earning the Tournament Most Outstanding Player Award.

Milroy continued to contribute in Houghton for the next two seasons, helping MTU to a WCHA Championship in 1966 and leading the team in scoring for his senior season. The Huskies, however, were upset in the second round of the conference tournament two years in a row by Michigan State and unable to return to the NCAA Tournament during Milroy's tenure. In his final season Milroy made his second appearance on the ALL-WCHA Second team and was named as a Western All-American.

After leaving Michigan Tech Milroy headed back to Ontario and continued his playing career, playing for the senior Toronto Marlboros for most of the season along with a small stint for the Phoenix Roadrunners. The next year Milroy joined the renamed Orilla Terriers of the OHA Sr. A and was part of the major improvement in the team's fortunes. In his first season Milroy scored 73 points in 38 games, finishing second on the team, and more than doubling their points in the standings. The following season Orillia won 31 of their 40 games and captured their first league title then proceeded to win the OHA playoff and become the eastern finalist for the Allan Cup. While Milroy's team fell to the Spokane Jets 2–4 in the seven-game series the Terriers would continue to be a power in the OHA for several more years, winning a second regular season title in 1971 and a playoff championship in 1973. In their second run at the Cup, Orillia made no mistake and defeated the St. Boniface Mohawks 4–1 in their home building. Milroy left Orillia after 1974, playing the three seasons with Whitby before calling it a career in 1977.

== Awards and honors ==
Award	Year
All-WCHA Second Team	1964–65
All-NCAA All-Tournament Team	1965
All-WCHA Second Team	1966–67
AHCA West All-American	1966–67

Awards and achievements
Preceded by Tom Polanic	WCHA Sophomore of the Year; 1964–65	Succeeded by Gary Gambucci
Preceded by Bob Gray	NCAA Tournament Most Outstanding Player; 1965	Succeeded by Gaye Cooley
