= Lyle Bradley =

Canadian ice hockey player (1943–2022)

- Born: July 31, 1943; Lloydminster, Saskatchewan, Canada
- Died: August 12, 2022 (aged 79); Salt Lake City, Utah, U.S.
- Height: 5 ft 9 in (175 cm)
- Weight: 161 lb (73 kg; 11 st 7 lb)
- Position: Centre
- Shot: Right
- Played for: California Golden Seals; Cleveland Barons
- Playing career: 1966–1978

Walter Lyle Bradley (July 31, 1943 – August 12, 2022) was a Canadian ice hockey centre. He played 6 games in the National Hockey League with the California Golden Seals and Cleveland Barons between 1974 and 1977: four games in 1974 with California, and two in 1977 with Cleveland. The rest of his career, which lasted from 1966 to 1978, was spent in various minor leagues. Prior to turning professional Bradley spent three seasons at the University of Denver. He died in Salt Lake City on August 12, 2022, at the age of 79.

== Career statistics ==
=== Regular season and playoffs ===
			Regular season					Playoffs
Season	Team	League	GP	G	A	Pts	PIM	GP	G	A	Pts	PIM
1960–61	Estevan Bruins	SJHL	2	0	0	2	2	—	—	—	—	—
1961–62	Estevan Bruins	SJHL	47	16	25	41	40	10	3	2	5	0
1962–63	Estevan Bruins	SJHL	54	23	45	68	54	11	10	8	18	14
1963–64	University of Denver	WCHA	8	7	16	23	17	—	—	—	—	—
1964–65	University of Denver	WCHA	12	3	7	10	16	—	—	—	—	—
1965–66	University of Denver	WCHA	32	12	34	46	43	—	—	—	—	—
1966–67	Des Moines Oak Leafs	IHL	69	28	63	91	113	7	2	3	5	8
1967–68	Des Moines Oak Leafs	IHL	72	27	54	81	98	—	—	—	—	—
1968–69	Houston Apollos	CHL	26	1	5	6	12	—	—	—	—	—
1968–69	Quebec Aces	AHL	22	6	7	13	38	15	3	4	7	6
1969–70	Salt Lake Golden Eagles	WHL	16	3	2	5	10	—	—	—	—	—
1969–70	Denver Spurs	WHL	24	7	11	18	25	—	—	—	—	—
1970–71	Denver Spurs	WHL	71	25	43	68	74	5	1	2	3	2
1971–72	Portland Buckaroos	WHL	28	7	12	19	20	—	—	—	—	—
1971–72	Salt Lake Golden Eagles	WHL	40	16	24	40	25	—	—	—	—	—
1972–73	Salt Lake Golden Eagles	WHL	71	29	58	87	83	9	1	4	5	15
1973–74	California Golden Seals	NHL	4	1	0	1	2	—	—	—	—	—
1973–74	Salt Lake Golden Eagles	WHL	76	34	81	115	29	5	1	1	2	4
1974–75	Salt Lake Golden Eagles	CHL	55	20	32	52	28	11	3	12	15	11
1975–76	Salt Lake Golden Eagles	CHL	76	17	57	74	65	5	1	3	4	2
1976–77	Cleveland Barons	NHL	2	0	0	0	0	—	—	—	—	—
1976–77	Salt Lake Golden Eagles	CHL	67	24	44	68	43	—	—	—	—	—
1977–78	Salt Lake Golden Eagles	CHL	62	16	41	57	50	6	1	2	3	2
WHL totals			326	121	231	352	266	19	3	7	10	21
NHL totals			6	1	0	1	2	—	—	—	—	—

== Awards and honors ==
Award	Year
NCAA All-Tournament Second Team	1966
