= Larry Patey =

Canadian ice hockey player

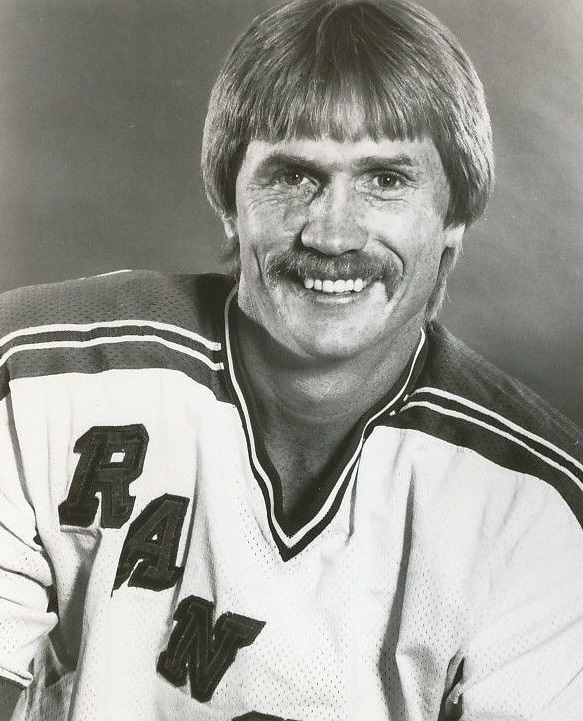
- Larry Patey in 1985
- Born: March 19, 1953 (age 72) Toronto, Ontario, Canada
- Height: 6 ft 1 in (185 cm)
- Weight: 185 lb (84 kg; 13 st 3 lb)
- Position: Centre
- Shot: Left
- Played for: California Golden Seals; St. Louis Blues; New York Rangers
- NHL draft: 130th overall, 1973; California Golden Seals
- WHA draft: 53rd overall, 1973; New England Whalers
- Playing career: 1973–1985

Larry James Patey (born March 19, 1953) is a Canadian former professional ice hockey player. Patey played twelve seasons in the National Hockey League between 1973–74 and 1984–85 with the California Golden Seals, St. Louis Blues, and New York Rangers. Larry is the brother of NHLer Doug Patey.

== Playing career ==
Patey was drafted 130th overall by the Golden Seals in the 1973 NHL Amateur Draft. As a pro rookie, he won the 1973–74 Western League Rookie Award. He played 717 career NHL games (over 600 of them with the Blues), scoring 153 goals and 316 points with 631 penalty minutes. In 1980–81, Patey scored eight shorthanded goals, which is a Blues team record.

== Personal life ==
Born in Toronto, he was raised in Port Credit, now part of Mississauga. He is now a real estate agent based in Chesterfield, Missouri.

== Career statistics ==
=== Regular season and playoffs ===
			Regular season					Playoffs
Season	Team	League	GP	G	A	Pts	PIM	GP	G	A	Pts	PIM
1972–73	Braintree Hawks	NEJHL	47	36	27	63	—	—	—	—	—	—
1973–74	California Golden Seals	NHL	1	0	0	0	0	—	—	—	—	—
1973–74	Salt Lake Golden Eagles	WHL	76	40	43	83	91	5	2	2	4	15
1974–75	California Golden Seals	NHL	79	25	20	45	68	—	—	—	—	—
1975–76	California Golden Seals	NHL	18	4	4	8	23	—	—	—	—	—
1975–76	St. Louis Blues	NHL	53	8	6	14	26	3	1	1	2	2
1976–77	St. Louis Blues	NHL	80	21	29	50	41	4	1	0	1	0
1977–78	St. Louis Blues	NHL	80	17	17	34	29	—	—	—	—	—
1978–79	St. Louis Blues	NHL	78	15	19	34	60	—	—	—	—	—
1979–80	St. Louis Blues	NHL	78	17	17	34	76	3	1	0	1	2
1980–81	St. Louis Blues	NHL	80	22	23	45	107	11	2	4	6	30
1981–82	St. Louis Blues	NHL	70	14	12	26	97	10	2	4	6	13
1982–83	St. Louis Blues	NHL	67	9	12	21	80	4	1	0	1	4
1983–84	St. Louis Blues	NHL	17	0	1	1	8	—	—	—	—	—
1983–84	New York Rangers	NHL	9	1	2	3	4	4	0	1	1	6
1984–85	New York Rangers	NHL	7	0	1	1	12	1	0	0	0	0
1984–85	New Haven Nighthawks	AHL	62	14	14	28	43	—	—	—	—	—
NHL totals			717	153	163	316	631	40	8	10	18	57
