= Amo Bessone =

American ice hockey player and coach (1926–2017)

- Bessone in 1943

Biographical details
- Born: November 22, 1922; Sagamore, Massachusetts, U.S.
- Died: January 9, 2010 (aged 87)
- Education: University of Illinois

Playing career
- 1940–1943: Illinois
- Position: Defenseman

Coaching career (HC unless noted)
- 1948–1951: Michigan Tech
- 1951–1979: Michigan State

Head coaching record
- Overall: 387–458–22 (.459)
- Tournaments: 4–2 (.667)

Accomplishments and honors

Championships
- 1966 NCAA National Champion

Awards
- 1966 Spencer Penrose Award
- Military career
- Burial place: Calvary Cemetery
- Allegiance: United States
- Branch: United States Navy
- Service years: 1942–1946
- Rank: Ensign

Amos "Betts" Bessone (November 22, 1916 – January 9, 2010) was a collegiate ice hockey player and head coach.

Bessone was born in Sagamore, Massachusetts, on Cape Cod, and raised in West Springfield, Massachusetts, where he learned to play hockey.

As a hockey coach, Bessone is best remembered for winning a national championship as a heavy underdog in 1966 with the "Cinderella Spartans." He was one of the most colorful college coaches of his era with a trademark whistle he used to signal line changes.

As intense as Bessone was behind the bench, he was warm and endearing off the ice. During his coaching days, he regularly invited fellow coaches, officials and reporters out for drinks or back to his house for spaghetti following games.

== Playing career ==
=== High school ===
Bessone played high school hockey in West Springfield, Massachusetts, and for two preparatory schools in Maine, Hebron Academy and Kents Hill School. Bessone also played hockey for Association Saint-Dominique, a Lewiston amateur team. During his days in Maine, he was described as cocky but one of the best defensemen in high school hockey. Bessone was graduated from Kents Hill in 1939.

=== College ===
After prep school, he played college hockey from 1940 to 1943 at the University of Illinois under legendary coach Vic Heyliger. He was team captain his senior season of 1942–43. In addition to hockey, Bessone earned letters in baseball and basketball.

=== Professional ===
Following Illinois, Bessone played minor league hockey in the AHL for the Providence Reds. He made his professional debut with the Reds on March 16, 1943, in the first game of the opening round of the AHL playoffs against the Cleveland Barons. His career in the AHL was cut short by serving in World War II. Bessone also played for his hometown Springfield minor league baseball team of the Eastern League.

== Coaching career ==
=== Westfield ===
Bessone was head ice hockey coach for Westfield High School for three seasons following his playing career.

=== Michigan Tech ===
Bessone got his first collegiate head coaching job on September 13, 1948, when he was hired by Michigan College of Mines and Technology (now Michigan Technological University). He coached at Michigan Tech for three seasons compiling a record of 20–31–2.

=== Michigan State ===
Following the 1951 season, Bessone accepted the head coaching position at Michigan State University after Harold Paulsen resigned. Bessone would remain at MSU for the next 28 years.

When Bessone arrived at Michigan State, the ice hockey program was just beginning its third season (after resuming competition following a 16-year hiatus) and its youth was evident with a 6–25 record over two seasons. The Spartans struggled with six losing seasons before Bessone turned things around in his seventh season as coach. In 1957–58, Michigan State enjoyed its first winning season. The following season, Bessone guided MSU to a Big Ten championship and a berth in the NCAA tournament. The Spartans lost the 1959 national championship game in overtime to North Dakota.

Following 1959, Michigan State became a charter member of the Western Collegiate Hockey Association (WCHA), which was a reincarnation of the loosely affiliated Midwest Collegiate Hockey League and Western Intercollegiate Hockey League that disbanded following the 1957–58 season. Bessone and MSU struggled during the first five seasons of the WCHA.

Again, Bessone turned things around with a winning season in 1964–65. The following season, Bessone coached Michigan State to an improbable NCAA national championship.

MSU began the 1965–66 season 4–10, but rebounded winning 12 of their last 15 games including both WCHA playoff games which earned MSU a spot in the NCAA tournament. In the national semifinals, Bessone squeaked out a 2–1 victory over highly favored Boston University. In the national championship game, Bessone and the Spartans faced Len Ceglarski's Clarkson team that owned the national-best record of 24–2. Michigan State shocked Clarkson with a dominant 6–1 victory sealing MSU's first national championship. Len Ceglarski and Bessone shared the Spencer Penrose Award as the national coach of the year in 1966. The national title and coaching award cemented Bessone's legacy as a coach. To this day, Bessone's 1966 Michigan State team remains one of the biggest underdog stories in NCAA ice hockey history. The total number of team victories (16) and team winning percentage (.551) is the lowest of any NCAA ice hockey champion. MSU made the NCAA tournament again with a strong WCHA playoff finish in 1967, but lost in the national semifinals.

Bessone began the 1970s with six straight winning seasons. As MSU hockey was building momentum, the 7,000-seat Munn Ice Arena was opened in 1974 just south of the old ice rink, Dem Hall. The peak of the momentum came in 1975–76 when Bessone guided MSU to its best WCHA conference finish. Michigan State was on the verge of earning an NCAA tournament berth when Minnesota knocked MSU out of the WCHA playoffs in triple overtime. Minnesota, who had finished below Michigan State in the conference, received an NCAA tournament bid instead.

The loss proved devastating to Bessone and the MSU hockey program. The Spartans suffered three straight losing seasons following 1976.

Bessone announced his retirement effective at the end of the 1978–79 season. He finished his coaching career with a 5–3 victory over archrival Michigan completing the weekend series sweep of the Wolverines. His success at Michigan State helped form a loyal group of MSU hockey supporters dubbed "Amo's Army." Bessone holds a 387–458–22 career record in 31 seasons.

== Legacy ==
Bessone's legacy extends beyond his accomplishments at Michigan State. Bessone helped establish the Greater Lansing Area Hockey Association (GLAHA), the first organized youth hockey program in Mid-Michigan. He assisted the league by donating used equipment and encouraging his players to volunteer as coaches. GLAHA started with three players in 1953 and by Bessone's retirement from coaching in 1979, the organization boasted 450 players. GLAHA alumni include current and former NHL players: Jeff Brubaker, Danton Cole, Kelly Miller, Kevin Miller, Kip Miller, Ryan Miller and Alfie Turcotte.

For his efforts in establishing GLAHA, Bessone received the first John MacInnes Award in 1983. The award, given out by the American Hockey Coaches Association, recognizes great concern for amateur hockey and youth programs.

In 1992, Bessone was inducted into the U.S. Hockey Hall of Fame.

Bessone is also the namesake of numerous awards including:

- The Amo Bessone Award (Springfield, Massachusetts) given to the top high school player in Western Massachusetts. The award is celebrated its 40th anniversary in 2007.
- Amo Bessone Award (Lansing, Michigan) given to the GLAHA coach of the year.
- Amo Bessone Award (Michigan State University) presented to an MSU hockey player for outstanding athletic, scholastic and community participation achievements.

== Personal ==
Bessone was married to Mary Kennedy Bessone. They had one son, John, who wrote for Sports Illustrated and was an associate television director for ABC Sports.

His older brother, Pete, played six games for the Detroit Red Wings in 1937–38. Pete had a successful career as a player in the AHL and is a member of the United States Hockey Hall of Fame.

Bessone retired first to Englewood, Florida, with his brother Pete Bessone, then later to Santa Fe, New Mexico, with his son John Bessone. His final visit to the Michigan State campus was October 2006 for a reunion of the 1966 and 1986 NCAA national championship teams.

=== Military service ===
Bessone enlisted in the United States Navy in 1942 and was discharged in 1946 as an ensign. He served on PT boats during World War II in both the European and Pacific theaters, including as the executive officer and the commanding officer.

== Head coaching record ==
Record table
| Season | Team | Overall | Conference | Standing | Postseason |
|---|---|---|---|---|---|
Michigan Tech Huskies Independent (1948–1951)
| 1948–49 | Michigan Tech | 5–10–0 | | | |
| 1949–50 | Michigan Tech | 10–7–0 | | | |
| 1950–51 | Michigan Tech | 5–14–2 | | | |
| Michigan Tech: | | 20–31–2 | | | |
Michigan State Spartans (MCHL) (1951–1953)
| 1951–52 | Michigan State | 7–13–0 | 3–9–0 | 6th | |
| 1952–53 | Michigan State | 5–16–1 | 2–16–0 | 7th | |
Michigan State Spartans (WIHL) (1953–1958)
| 1953–54 | Michigan State | 8–14–1 | 4–13–1 | 6th | |
| 1954–55 | Michigan State | 9–17–1 | 5–14–1 | 7th | |
| 1955–56 | Michigan State | 5–18–0 | 1–17–0 | 7th | |
| 1956–57 | Michigan State | 7–15–0 | 5–15–0 | 7th | |
| 1957–58 | Michigan State | 12–11–0 | 9–11–0 | 5th | |
Michigan State Spartans (Big Ten) (1958–1959)
| 1958–59 | Michigan State | 17–6–1 | 5–2–1 | 1st | NCAA runner-up |
Michigan State Spartans (WCHA / Big Ten) (1959–1979)
| 1959–60 | Michigan State | 4–18–2 | 4–18–2 | 7th / 3rd | |
| 1960–61 | Michigan State | 11–16–0 | 5–15–0 | 6th / 3rd | |
| 1961–62 | Michigan State | 13–11–1 | 6–9–1 | 4th / 2nd | WCHA consolation game (win) |
| 1962–63 | Michigan State | 11–12–0 | 6–10–0 | T – 5th / 2nd | |
| 1963–64 | Michigan State | 8–17–1 | 1–12–1 | 7th / 3rd | |
| 1964–65 | Michigan State | 17–12–0 | 7–7–0 | 4th / 2nd | WCHA first round |
| 1965–66 | Michigan State | 16–13–0 | 9–11–0 | 4th / 2nd | NCAA Champion |
| 1966–67 | Michigan State | 16–15–1 | 8–11–1 | 5th / 1st | NCAA third-place game (win) |
| 1967–68 | Michigan State | 11–16–2 | 6–13–1 | 6th / 3rd | WCHA first round |
| 1968–69 | Michigan State | 11–16–1 | 7–10–1 | 6th / 2nd | WCHA East Regional semifinals |
| 1969–70 | Michigan State | 13–16–0 | 10–12–0 | 7th / T – 3rd | WCHA West Regional semifinals |
| 1970–71 | Michigan State | 19–12–0 | 12–10–0 | 4th / 1st | WCHA West Regional semifinals |
| 1971–72 | Michigan State | 20–16–0 | 15–13–0 | 4th / 3rd | WCHA second round |
| 1972–73 | Michigan State | 23–12–1 | 16–9–1 | 4th / T – 1st | WCHA first round |
| 1973–74 | Michigan State | 23–14–1 | 15–12–1 | 4th / T – 3rd | WCHA second round |
| 1974–75 | Michigan State | 22–17–1 | 19–12–1 | 5th / 4th | WCHA second round |
| 1975–76 | Michigan State | 23–15–2 | 20–12–0 | 2nd / 1st | WCHA second round |
| 1976–77 | Michigan State | 14–21–1 | 11–20–1 | T – 8th / 4th | |
| 1977–78 | Michigan State | 7–27–2 | 7–23–2 | 10th / 4th | |
| 1978–79 | Michigan State | 15–21–0 | 12–20–0 | T – 8th / T – 3rd | |
| Michigan State: | | 367–427–20 | | | |
| Total: | | 387–458–22 | | | |
National champion Postseason invitational champion Conference regular season champion Conference regular season and conference tournament champion Division regular season champion Division regular season and conference tournament champion Conference tournament champion

Awards and achievements
| Preceded by James Fullerton | Spencer Penrose Award; 1965–66 (With Len Ceglarski) | Succeeded by Edward Jeremiah |
| Preceded by Herb Gallagher | Hobey Baker Legends of College Hockey Award; 1986 | Succeeded by Murray Murdoch |
