= 1965 NCAA University Division men's ice hockey tournament =

College ice hockey tournament

- Teams: 4
- Finals site: Meehan Auditorium, Providence, Rhode Island
- Champions: Michigan Tech Huskies (2nd title)
- Runner-up: Boston College Eagles (2nd title game)
- Semifinalists: Brown Bears (2nd Frozen Four); North Dakota Fighting Sioux (4th Frozen Four)
- Winning coach: John MacInnes (2nd title)
- MOP: Gary Milroy (Michigan Tech)

The 1965 NCAA Men's University Division Ice Hockey Tournament was the culmination of the 1964–65 NCAA University Division men's ice hockey season, the 18th such tournament in NCAA history. It was held between March 18 and 20, 1965, and concluded with Michigan Tech defeating Boston College 8-2. All games were played at the Meehan Auditorium in Providence, Rhode Island.

This is the first time the NCAA tournament did not have a participant that appeared in the previous season's meeting.

== Qualifying teams ==
Four teams qualified for the tournament, two each from the eastern and western regions. The ECAC tournament champion and the WCHA tournament champion received automatic bids into the tournament. Two at-large bids were offered to one eastern and one western team based upon both their tournament finish as well as their regular season record.

East							West						
Seed	School	Conference	Record	Berth type	Appearance	Last bid	Seed	School	Conference	Record	Berth type	Appearance	Last bid
1	Boston College	ECAC Hockey	23–6–0	Tournament champion	8th	1963	1	Michigan Tech	WCHA	22–5–2	Tournament champion	4th	1962
2	Brown	ECAC Hockey	21–7–0	At-Large	2nd	1951	2	North Dakota	WCHA	24–7–0	At-Large	4th	1963

== Format ==
The ECAC champion was seeded as the top eastern team while the WCHA champion was given the top western seed. The second eastern seed was slotted to play the top western seed and vice versa. All games were played at the Meehan Auditorium. All matches were Single-game eliminations with the semifinal winners advancing to the national championship game and the losers playing in a consolation game.

== Bracket ==
Semifinals; March 18–19
E1	Boston College	4
W2	North Dakota	3
W1	Michigan Tech	4
E2	Brown	0

National championship March 20
E1	Boston College	2
W1	Michigan Tech	8
Third-place game
W2	North Dakota	9
E2	Brown	5

Note: * denotes overtime period(s)

=== Semifinals ===
==== Boston College vs. North Dakota ====
March 18	Boston College	4 – 3	North Dakota	Meehan Auditorium	Recap
(Kearns) Jerry York - 18:53		First period	No scoring
(Flaherty, Moylan) Dick Fuller - 01:02		Second period	10:05 - Gerry Kell (unassisted)
(Dyer) John Cunniff - PP - 05:22 (Downes) Jerry York - GW - 14:38		Third period	13:41 - Bob Stoyko (Wilms); 15:30 - Gerry Kell (Ross)
(36 saves) Pat Murphy		Goalie stats	Joe Lech (21 saves)

==== Michigan Tech vs. Brown ====
March 19	Michigan Tech	4 – 0	Brown	Meehan Auditorium
(Yoshino, Toothill) Fred Dart - GW - 13:29 (Weller, Holm) Gary Milroy - 19:47		First period	No Scoring
		Second period
(Ryan) Fred Dart - 08:13 (Holm, Milroy) Wayne Weller - 19:25		Third period
Rick Best ( 20 saves )		Goalie stats	( 29 saves ) Dave Ferguson

=== Consolation Game ===
==== North Dakota vs. Brown ====
March 20	North Dakota	9 – 5	Brown	Meehan Auditorium	Recap
(Strimbiski, Stoyko) Roy Davidson - 04:15 (unassisted) Bill Wilms - PP - 08:36		First period	10:01 - PP - Dennis Macks (Eccleston, Boyle); 12:20 - John Norwell (Gaudreau, Bruce)
(Mazur) Dave Janaway - 08:02 (unassisted) Bob Stoyko - 15:40 (Hextall) Terry Casey - SH - 18:09		Second period	00:14 - Dennis Macks (unassisted); 08:25 - John Norwell (Gaudreau)
(Mazur) Roy Davidson - GW - 01:05 (Strimbiski, Wilms) Bob Stoyko - 02:13 (Janaway) Dave Mazur - 08:39 (Strimbiski, Stoyko) Bill Wilms - 16:32		Third period	01:32 - Bruce Darling (Barrett)
(21 saves) Joe Lech		Goalie stats	Dave Ferguson (37 saves)

=== National Championship ===
==== Boston College vs. Michigan Tech ====
March 20	Boston College	2 – 8	Michigan Tech	Meehan Auditorium

Scoring summary
Period	Team	Goal	Assist(s)	Time	Score
1st	MTU	Gary Milroy	Weller	7:28	1–0 MTU
1st	MTU	Wayne Weller	Milroy and Holm	13:12	2–0 MTU
1st	MTU	Bob Wilson – GW PP	Leiman and Yeo	18:56	3–0 MTU
2nd	MTU	Colin Patterson	Wilson and Yeo	22:13	4–0 MTU
2nd	MTU	Fred Dart	Yoshino and Toothill	23:37	5–0 MTU
2nd	MTU	Gary Milroy – PP	Riutta and Huculak	34:58	6–0 MTU
2nd	BC	E. J. Breen – PP	Toran	37:24	6–1 MTU
2nd	MTU	Wayne Weller	Milroy	39:26	7–1 MTU
3rd	BC	Jim Mullen	Dyer and Cunniff	46:02	7–2 MTU
3rd	MTU	Bob Wilson	unassisted	57:58	8–2 MTU
Penalty summary
Period	Team	Player	Penalty	Time	PIM
1st	MTU	Terry Ryan	Holding	6:00	2:00
1st	BC	John Moylan	Cross-checking	6:00	2:00
1st	MTU	Colin Patterson	Cross-checking	8:47	2:00
1st	MTU	Ed Caterer	Tripping	10:52	2:00
1st	BC	Woody Johnson	Elbowing	16:57	2:00
2nd	BC	Francis Kearns	Interference	24:02	2:00
2nd	MTU	Dennis Huculak	Holding	32:04	2:00
2nd	BC	Jim Mullen	Illegal check	34:23	2:00
2nd	MTU	Gary Milroy	Slashing	36:06	2:00
2nd	MTU	David Confrey	Charging	36:41	2:00
2nd	MTU	Wayne Weller	Tripping	39:32	2:00
2nd	MTU	Al Holm	Roughing	39:32	2:00
2nd	BC	Woody Johnson	Roughing	39:32	2:00
3rd	BC	Ralphy Toran	Slashing	42:08	2:00
3rd	BC	Francis Kearns	Elbowing	50:47	2:00
3rd	MTU	Dennis Huculak	Slashing	50:47	2:00
3rd	MTU	Terry Ryan	Tripping	54:17	2:00

Shots by period
Team	1	2	3	T
Boston College	5	11	11	27
Michigan Tech	10	14	11	35

Goaltenders
Team	Name	Saves	Goals against	Time on ice
BC	Pat Murphy	27	8	
MTU	Tony Esposito	27	2	

== All-Tournament team ==
=== First Team ===
- G: Tony Esposito (Michigan Tech)
- D: Dennis Huculak (Michigan Tech)
- D: Pete Leiman (Michigan Tech)
- F: John Cunniff (Boston College)
- F: Gary Milroy* (Michigan Tech)
- F: Wayne Weller (Michigan Tech)

* Most Outstanding Player(s)

=== Second Team ===
- G: Pat Murphy (Boston College)
- D: Roy Davidson (North Dakota)
- D: Ralph Toran (Boston College)
- F: Gerry Kell (North Dakota)
- F: Bob Stoyko (North Dakota)
- F: Dennis Macks (Brown)
