= 1965–66 NCAA University Division men's ice hockey season =

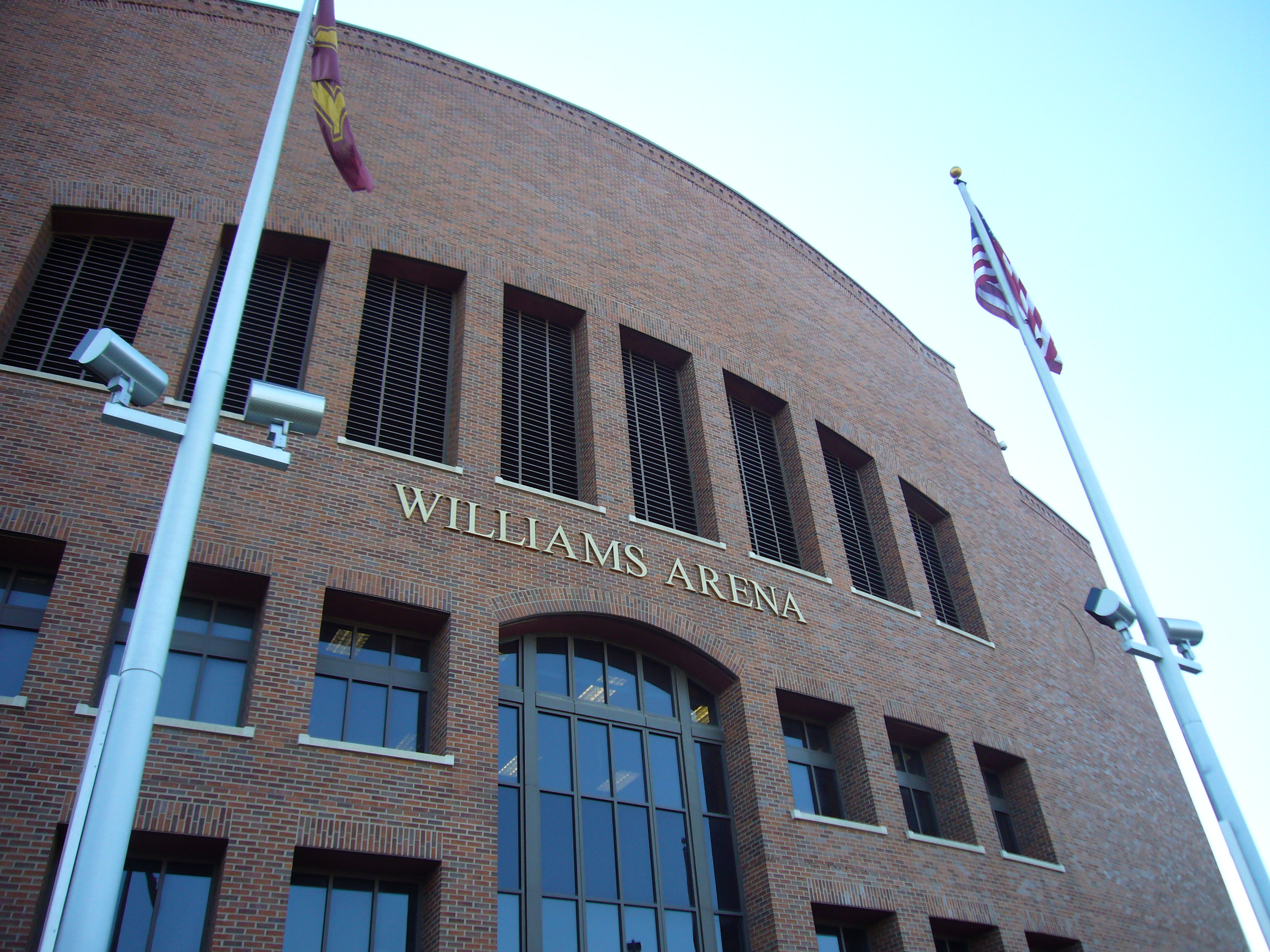
- The Williams Arena served as the host for the 1966 Tournament
- Duration: November 1965– March 19, 1966
- NCAA tournament: 1966
- National championship: Williams Arena; Minneapolis, Minnesota
- NCAA champion: Michigan State

The 1965–66 NCAA University Division men's ice hockey season began in November 1965 and concluded with the 1966 NCAA University Division Men's Ice Hockey Tournament's championship game on March 19, 1966, at the Williams Arena in Minneapolis, Minnesota. This was the 19th season in which an NCAA ice hockey championship was held and is the 72nd year overall where an NCAA school fielded a team.

Minnesota–Duluth joined the WCHA beginning with this season. Pennsylvania promoted their club program to varsity status and began playing as an independent.

== Regular season ==
=== Season tournaments ===
Tournament	Dates	Teams	Champion
New Brunswick Invitational	November 26–27	4	
Boston Garden Christmas Hockey Festival	December 17–18	6	Toronto
ECAC Holiday Hockey Festival	December 19–22	6	Cornell
Great Lakes Invitational	December 21–22	4	Toronto
Boston Arena Christmas Tournament	December 27–29	4	Boston University
Yankee Conference Tournament	December 28–29	4	New Hampshire
Rensselaer Holiday Tournament	December 28–30	4	Western Ontario
Brown Holiday Tournament	December 29–30	4	Brown
St. Paul College Hockey Tournament	December 29–30	4	Minnesota
Nichols School Invitational	December 31–January 1	4	Yale
Beanpot	February 7, 14	4	Boston University

=== Standings ===
1965–66 Big Ten standings
	Conference							Overall					
	GP	W	L	T	PTS	GF	GA	GP	W	L	T	GF	GA
Minnesota†	8	5	3	0	10	34	29	27	16	11	0	117	94
Michigan State	8	4	4	0	8	34	32	29	16	13	0	123	111
Michigan	8	3	5	0	6	25	32	28	14	14	0	125	109
† indicates conference regular season champion

1965–66 ECAC Hockey standings
	Conference							Overall					
	GP	W	L	T	Pct.	GF	GA	GP	W	L	T	GF	GA
Clarkson†*	12	11	1	0	.917	67	28	27	24	3	0	150	70
Boston University	19	17	2	0	.895	105	75	35	27	8	0	178	92
Cornell	18	16	2	0	.889	92	33	27	22	5	0	151	54
Brown	18	12	6	0	.667	86	60	25	16	9	0	114	85
St. Lawrence	15	8	6	1	.567	75	54	24	15	8	1	130	95
Boston College	22	12	10	0	.545	105	80	28	16	12	0	135	101
Colgate	16	8	7	1	.531	79	67	26	14	11	1	137	98
Northeastern	18	9	8	1	.528	80	71	29	16	12	1	140	120
Harvard	19	8	11	0	.421	77	81	23	10	12	1	104	99
Yale	21	8	12	1	.405	82	103	23	10	12	1	86	105
Army	10	3	6	1	.350	34	69	25	17	7	1	132	85
Princeton	19	6	12	1	.342	76	101	20	7	12	1	76	101
Dartmouth	18	2	14	2	.167	55	111	24	5	17	2	80	127
Providence	14	2	12	0	.143	42	77	21	7	14	0	77	93
Rensselaer	13	0	13	0	.000	18	112	22	3	19	0	42	161
Championship: Clarkson † indicates conference regular season champion * indicates conference tournament champion

1965–66 Independent College Athletic Conference standings
	Conference							Overall					
	GP	W	L	T	PTS	GF	GA	GP	W	L	T	GF	GA
Clarkson†	4	4	0	0	8	32	9	27	24	3	0	150	70
St. Lawrence	4	2	2	0	4	22	9	24	15	8	1	130	95
Rensselaer	4	0	4	0	0	4	40	22	3	19	0	42	161
† indicates conference regular season champion

1965–66 NCAA University Division Independent ice hockey standings
	Conference							Overall					
	GP	W	L	T	PTS	GF	GA	GP	W	L	T	GF	GA
Alaska–Fairbanks	0	0	0	0	-	-	-	7	1	6	0	-	-
Ohio State	0	0	0	0	-	-	-	16	9	7	0	75	65
Pennsylvania	0	0	0	0	-	-	-	24	16	8	0		
Wisconsin	0	0	0	0	-	-	-	21	12	9	0	105	66

1965–66 Western Collegiate Hockey Association standings
	Conference							Overall					
	GP	W	L	T	PCT	GF	GA	GP	W	L	T	GF	GA
Michigan Tech†	20	15	4	1	.775	77	48	30	23	6	1	141	82
North Dakota	22	13	9	0	.591	97	85	30	17	12	1	135	115
Minnesota	22	13	9	0	.591	92	76	27	16	11	0	117	94
Denver*	20	10	7	3	.575	81	61	32	18	11	3	137	100
Michigan	18	9	9	0	.500	74	72	28	14	14	0	125	109
Michigan State*	20	9	11	0	.450	88	85	29	16	13	0	123	111
Colorado College	18	4	12	2	.278	51	93	29	9	18	2	98	147
Minnesota-Duluth	20	3	15	2	.200	60	100	28	7	19	2	96	137
Championship: Michigan State, Denver † indicates conference regular season champion * indicates conference tournament champion

== 1966 NCAA Tournament ==
Semifinals; March 17–18
W1	Denver	3
E2	Clarkson	4
E1	Boston University	1
W2	Michigan State	2

National Championship; March 19
E2	Clarkson	1
W2	Michigan State	6
Third Place Game
W1	Denver	4
E1	Boston University	3

Note: * denotes overtime period(s)

== Player stats ==
=== Scoring leaders ===
The following players led the league in points at the conclusion of the season.

GP = Games played; G = Goals; A = Assists; Pts = Points; PIM = Penalty minutes

Player	Class	Team	GP	G	A	Pts	PIM
Doug Ferguson	Junior	Cornell	27	37	34	71	76
Fred Bassi	Junior	Boston University	35	35	29	64	33
Michael Doran	Junior	Cornell	27	23	39	62	48
Doug Volmar	Sophomore	Michigan State	29	26	28	54	57
Terry Casey	Senior	North Dakota	30	26	28	54	2
Bruce Fennie	Senior	Boston University	32	23	30	53	21
David Ferguson	Junior	Cornell	27	23	29	52	41
Mel Wakabayashi	Junior	Michigan	28	19	33	52	2
Dennis Macks	Sophomore	Brown	25	24	26	50	-
Raymond Clegg	Junior	Wisconsin	22	27	22	49	9
Robert Empie	Sophomore	Clarkson	25	27	22	49	16
Jim Quinn	Junior	Boston University	35	24	25	49	21

=== Leading goaltenders ===
The following goaltenders led the league in goals against average at the end of the regular season while playing at least 33% of their team's total minutes.

GP = Games played; Min = Minutes played; W = Wins; L = Losses; OT = Overtime/shootout losses; GA = Goals against; SO = Shutouts; SV% = Save percentage; GAA = Goals against average

Player	Class	Team	GP	Min	W	L	OT	GA	SO	SV%	GAA
Errol McKibbon	Senior	Cornell	16	-	-	-	-	-	-	.928	1.94
David Quarrie	Junior	Cornell	11	-	-	-	-	-	-	.912	1.99
Wayne Ryan	Junior	Boston University	13	640	-	-	-	24	0	.903	2.25
Terry Yurkiewicz	Senior	Clarkson	-	1366	24	-	0	56	0	.906	2.46
Rick Best	Junior	Michigan Tech	13	-	-	-	-	-	-	.901	2.62
Tony Esposito	Junior	Michigan Tech	19	-	-	-	-	-	-	.909	2.69
David Ferguson	Senior	Brown	25	1500	16	9	0	77	0	.898	3.08
Buddy Blom	Senior	Denver	32	1918	18	11	3	99	0	.898	3.09
Gaye Cooley	Sophomore	Michigan State	18	1080	-	-	-	56	0	.903	3.10
Gary Johnson	Junior	Wisconsin	21	-	-	-	-	-	0	.905	3.14

== Awards ==
=== NCAA ===
Award		Recipient
Spencer Penrose Award		Amo Bessone, Michigan State
		Len Ceglarski, Clarkson
Most Outstanding Player in NCAA Tournament		Gaye Cooley, Michigan State
AHCA All-American Teams
East Team	Position	West Team
Terry Yurkiewicz, Clarkson	G	Tony Esposito, Michigan Tech
Robert Gaudreau, Brown	D	Bob Hill, Minnesota-Duluth
Tom Ross, Boston University	D	Bruce Riutta, Michigan Tech
	D	Wayne Smith, Denver
Fred Bassi, Boston University	F	Terry Casey, North Dakota
John Cunniff, Boston College	F	Bob Lindberg, Colorado College
Doug Ferguson, Cornell	F	Doug Volmar, Michigan State

=== ECAC ===
Award		Recipient
Player of the Year		Terry Yurkiewicz, Clarkson
Rookie of the Year		Kent Parrot, Harvard
Outstanding Defenseman		Robert Gaudreau, Brown
Most Outstanding Player in Tournament		Terry Yurkiewicz, Clarkson
All-ECAC Hockey Teams
First Team	Position	Second Team
Jack Ferreira, Boston University	G	Terry Yurkiewicz, Clarkson
Robert Gaudreau, Brown	D	Gary Petterson, Clarkson
Peter McLachlan, Boston University	D	Tom Ross, Boston University
Harry Orr, Cornell	D	
Doug Ferguson, Cornell	F	Tom Hurley, Clarkson
Bruce Fennie, Boston University	F	John Cunniff, Boston College
Fred Bassi, Boston University	F	Mike Doran, Cornell

=== WCHA ===
Award		Recipient
Most Valuable Player		Mel Wakabayashi, Michigan
Sophomore of the Year		Gary Gambucci, Minnesota
Coach of the Year		John MacInnes, Michigan Tech
All-WCHA Teams
First Team	Position	Second Team
Tony Esposito, Michigan Tech	G	John Lothrop, Minnesota
Wayne Smith, Denver	D	Dennis Huculak, Michigan Tech
Bruce Riutta, Michigan Tech	D	Bob Hill, Minnesota-Duluth
Doug Volmar, Michigan State	F	Wayne Weller, Michigan Tech
Terry Casey, North Dakota	F	Mel Wakabayashi, Michigan
Dennis Hextall, North Dakota	F	Gary Gambucci, Minnesota

== 1966 NHL Amateur Draft ==
Round	Pick	Player	College	Conference	NHL team
4	21	Brian Morenz ^{†}	Denver	WCHA	Chicago Black Hawks

† incoming freshman

== See also ==
- 1965–66 NCAA College Division men's ice hockey season
