= Fred Bassi =

Canadian ice hockey player

- Born: 1945 (age 80–81) Niagara Falls, Ontario, Canada
- Height: 5 ft 11 in (180 cm)
- Weight: 182 lb (83 kg; 13 st 0 lb)
- Position: Forward
- Played for: Boston University; Syracuse Blazers; Johnstown Jets
- NHL draft: Undrafted
- Playing career: 1964–1970
- Boxing career
- Nationality: Canadian
- Weight: Heavyweight

Boxing record
- Total fights: 2
- Wins: 1
- Win by KO: 1
- Losses: 1

Fred Bassi is a Canadian retired ice hockey Center and coach who was an All-American for Boston University.

== Career ==
Bassi began playing varsity hockey for Boston University in 1964. As a sophomore, Bassi played well on offense. However, head coach Jack Kelley benched him for half the season because he didn't backcheck. After the season, Bassi got involved in boxing and was paid $20 for two appearances. He won both bouts but never made any further appearances in the ring until years later.

As a junior, Bassi was put on a line with Bruce Fennie and Dennis O'Connell, forming a potent trio that pushed BU towards the top of the conference. Bassi led the team in scoring and finished as the second leading scorer in the nation. His 64-point season earned him a place on both the All-ECAC First Team and All-American team. Bassi used his large frame to position himself in front of the net and act as a "garbage collector" by knocking in rebounds. He was also able to rely on his experience as a boxer to establish his toughness; after knocking out a Harvard player in the 1966 Beanpot tournament with one punch, few were willing to challenge Bassi to additional fights. Bassi also helped his team to a third-place finish in the ECAC Tournament that season, being named to the All-Tournament Second Team, but due to Cornell turning down its invitation, BU was able to make the NCAA Tournament.

As a senior, Bassi led the team with 30 goals and helped the Terriers finish atop ECAC Hockey. The team battled Cornell all season for the claim as the best team and the two tied their only regular season meeting. The second game between the two came in the ECAC Championship game and the Terriers fell by a narrow 3–4 margin. BU returned to the NCAA tournament due to their Runner-up finish and met the Big Red again in the championship game. Bassi's final college point came on BU's first goal of the game; unfortunately, it turned out to be the Terriers' only goal of the match and BU lost 1–4.

After graduating, Bassi continued his playing career for a few years but retired in 1970 while also pursuing a graduate degree at Boston University. In the fall of that year, he joined Niagara College as a member of the athletic department faculty and immediately took over as the head coach of the ice hockey team. He spent the next thirty years working in that capacity and added stints as coach of the tennis, touch football and cross-country teams as well. Bassi led the Knights ice hockey program to 5 gold medal finishes in the International Collegiate Hockey League as well as four silver and five bronze medals.

In 1977, Bassi returned to the ring, primarily to lose weight as he had gotten up to 220 lbs. at the time. His training went well and Bassi started appearing in amateur bouts. In the late 1970s and early 80s, he fought 38 matches, producing a record of 26–12. In March 1981, Bassi fought his first professional match against Lou Alexander who was 4 inches taller and nearly 50 pounds heavier. Bassi lost in the second round after a few knockdowns but he fought one more match a year later, earning a TKO over Morris Fulgham. Bassi was inducted into the Boston University Athletic Hall of Fame in 1987 and the Niagara College Athletic Hall of Fame upon his retirement in 2000.

== Career statistics ==
=== Regular season and playoffs ===
==== Ice Hockey ====
			Regular Season					Playoffs
Season	Team	League	GP	G	A	Pts	PIM	GP	G	A	Pts	PIM
1964–65	Boston University	ECAC Hockey	15	15	13	28	8	—	—	—	—	—
1965–66	Boston University	ECAC Hockey	35	35	29	64	33	—	—	—	—	—
1966–67	Boston University	ECAC Hockey	31	30	19	49	26	—	—	—	—	—
1967–68	Syracuse Blazers	EHL	71	27	36	63	161	—	—	—	—	—
1968–69	Johnstown Jets	EHL	7	0	2	2	11	—	—	—	—	—
1969–70	Braintree Hawks	NEnHL	—	30	16	46	—	—	—	—	—	—
NCAA Totals			81	80	61	141	67	—	—	—	—	—

== Professional boxing record ==
2 fights	1 win	1 loss
By knockout	1	1
By decision	0	0

No.	Result	Record	Opponent	Type	Round	Date	Age	Location
2	Win	1–1	(United States) Morris Fulgham	TKO	1	Aug 13, 1982	36	(Canada) Welland Arena, Welland, Ontario, CAN
1	Loss	0–1	(United States) Lou Alexander	TKO	2	Mar 6, 1981	35	(Canada) Niagara Arena, Niagara Falls, Ontario, CAN

== Awards and honors ==
Award	Year
All-ECAC Hockey First Team	1965–66
AHCA East All-American	1965–66
ECAC Hockey All-Tournament Second Team	1966
