= Bob Hill (ice hockey) =

American ice hockey player

- Born: 1944 (age 81–82) Duluth, Minnesota, USA
- Height: 6 ft 1 in (185 cm)
- Weight: 190 lb (86 kg; 13 st 8 lb)
- Position: Defenseman
- Played for: Minnesota–Duluth
- NHL draft: Undrafted
- Playing career: 1962–1966

Robert Hill is an American retired ice hockey defenseman and coach who was the first All-American for Minnesota–Duluth.

== Career ==
Hill was born and raised in Duluth, playing hockey for Duluth East alongside Dick Fisher and won the 1960 State Championship. In 1962 Hill followed his defensive partner Fisher to Minnesota–Duluth. The Bulldogs were in the process of transition to the top level of college hockey but were playing as an independent. This allowed Hill to start playing for UMD as a freshman and he proved to be one of the top Bulldogs defenders from the start. When he was a senior Hill's team joined the WCHA and, to very little surprise, the team finished last in their first season of conference play. Despite this, Hill was named as the program's first All-American.

After graduating Hill remained in the area and worked as a teacher. He became the head coach of the hockey team at Denfeld High School in 1970 and earned a Master's degree the following year. He remained at Denfield until 1984 when he returned to his old high school, Duluth East, to coach both of his sons on the hockey team, as well as Dick Fisher's son Dave. Hill retired after the 1986 season and was inducted into the Minnesota–Duluth Athletic Hall of Fame in 1995.

== Personal life ==
Hill's two sons, Noel and Sean both played college hockey after being coached by their father in high school. Noel played at Wisconsin–Eau Claire while Sean attended Wisconsin–Madison and went on to a 17-year NHL career.

== Career statistics ==
=== Regular season and playoffs ===
			Regular Season					Playoffs
Season	Team	League	GP	G	A	Pts	PIM	GP	G	A	Pts	PIM
1959–60	Duluth East	MN-HS	—	—	—	—	—	—	—	—	—	—
1960–61	Duluth East	MN-HS	—	—	—	—	—	—	—	—	—	—
1961–62	Duluth East	MN-HS	—	—	—	—	—	—	—	—	—	—
1962–63	Minnesota–Duluth	NCAA	24	3	9	12	4	—	—	—	—	—
1963–64	Minnesota–Duluth	NCAA	25	5	13	18	10	—	—	—	—	—
1964–65	Minnesota–Duluth	NCAA	27	9	25	34	33	—	—	—	—	—
1965–66	Minnesota–Duluth	WCHA	28	8	19	27	24	—	—	—	—	—
NCAA Totals			104	25	66	91	71	—	—	—	—	—

== Awards and honors ==
Award	Year
All-WCHA Second Team	1965–66
AHCA West All-American	1965–66
