= Rick Best =

Canadian ice hockey player

- Born: June 28, 1944 (age 82) Victoria, British Columbia, Canada
- Height: 5 ft 9 in (175 cm)
- Weight: 170 lb (77 kg; 12 st 2 lb)
- Position: Goaltender
- Played for: Michigan Tech; Dayton Gems
- NHL draft: Undrafted
- Playing career: 1964–1968

Richard W. Best is a Canadian retired ice hockey goaltender who was an All-American for Michigan Tech.

== Career ==
Best was recruited to Michigan Tech in 1963. After a year with the freshman team, Best began playing on the varsity team and split the starting role with Tony Esposito. Despite Esposito being seen as one of, if not the best goaltender in the WCHA, head coach John MacInnes saw the two as roughly equal. Best started 14 games to Esposito's 17 and the pair combined for 24 wins and led the Huskies to a 2nd-place finish in the conference. MTU overcame North Dakota in the WCHA championship game to capture their third conference title in six years. The Huskies received the top western seed for the NCAA Tournament and, with MacInnes continuing to rotate his goaltenders, Rick Best started the semifinal game against Brown. Best rewarded MacInnes' trust by not allowing a single goal in the game, producing the first shutout in tournament history. After blanking the Bears, some were surprised when Best was not in goal for the championship game, but when Michigan Tech won 8–2 there was little reason to criticize the move.

Best continued to share the MTU net with Esposito for the next two seasons, helping the team earn the top seed in the conference tournament the following year, only to see the Huskies stymied in the second round by an upstart Michigan State squad. As a senior Best was named to the All-WCHA Second Team and was an All-American. He shared the later honor with Esposito, and the two became the only goaltenders on the same team to both be named All-Americans in the same year (as of 2020).

After graduating, best played one season of professional hockey for the Dayton Gems before retiring. He was inducted into the Michigan Tech Athletic Hall of Fame in 1994.

== Statistics ==
=== Regular season and playoffs ===
			Regular season									Playoffs
Season	Team	League	GP	W	L	T	MIN	GA	SO	GAA	SV%	GP	W	L	MIN	GA	SO	GAA	SV%
1961–62	Winnipeg Braves	MJHL	39	9	22	8	2350	168	0	4.30	.837	—	—	—	—	—	—	—	—
1962–63	Winnipeg Braves	MJHL	37	14	20	3	2245	142	1	3.83	.880	3	0	3	180	18	0	6.00	—
1964–65	Michigan Tech	WCHA	14	—	—	—	840	42	1	3.00	.893	—	—	—	—	—	—	—	—
1965–66	Michigan Tech	WCHA	13	—	—	—	—	—	0	2.62	.901	—	—	—	—	—	—	—	—
1966–67	Michigan Tech	WCHA	15	—	—	—	900	45	1	3.00	.895	—	—	—	—	—	—	—	—
1967–68	Dayton Gems	IHL	31	—	—	—	1750	123	0	4.22	—	7	—	—	442	24	0	3.24	—
MJHL totals			76	23	42	11	4595	310	1	4.05	.860	—	—	—	—	—	—	—	—
NCAA totals			42	—	—	—	—	—	2	2.88	—	—	—	—	—	—	—	—	—

== Awards and honors ==
Award	Year
All-WCHA Second Team	1966–67
AHCA West All-American	1966–67
