= Terry Casey (ice hockey) =

American ice hockey player (1943–1967)

- Born: November 11, 1943 Great Falls, Montana, USA
- Died: July 7, 1967 (aged 23) Route 2 outside Hinsdale, Montana, USA
- Height: 5 ft 8 in (173 cm)
- Weight: 153 lb (69 kg; 10 st 13 lb)
- Position: Right Wing
- Played for: North Dakota
- National team: United States
- NHL draft: Undrafted
- Playing career: 1962–1967

Terry Casey (November 11, 1943-July 7, 1967) was an American ice hockey Right Wing who was an All-American for North Dakota. After being selected to the US National Team for the 1968 Winter Olympics, Casey was killed in a car accident at the age of 23.

== Career ==
Casey was star player in Great Falls, joining the local senior amateur team when he was a freshman in high school. Though he was undersized, Casey was a fast skater and had an ability to avoid others on the ice. After graduating in 1962 he began attending the University of North Dakota and played on the freshman team while the varsity club won a national championship. His turn came the following year but Casey had a little difficulty adjusting to college hockey. He seemed to have things figured out in his junior year, however, and tied for the team lead in goals as the Fighting Sioux posted 25 wins and finished 3rd in the NCAA Tournament.

Casey was named team captain for his senior season and led the team in scoring, finishing tied for fourth in the nation with 54 points. He was named to the All-WCHA First Team and was an All-American. UND finished second in the conference but were stymied in the second round by Denver and missed a chance to return to the national tournament.

After graduating, Casey joined the US National Team for the 1967 Ice Hockey World Championships and scored two goals for the 5th-place team. The result ensured the US a spot in the 1968 Winter Olympics and shortly after the '67 championships Casey was named to the Olympic roster.

That summer Casey was heading to a softball tournament in Plentywood when the car he was traveling in crossed the center divide and struck another vehicle traveling in the opposite direction. Casey, as well as fellow passengers Bob Fairfull and Danny Ryan were killed while driver John Evankovich survived. All men were from Great Falls. The driver of the other car, Alice Riley, survived along with her four children, but two of her passengers, William Strowbridge and his wife Bonnie, were also killed. An investigation reveled that the speedometer from Riley's car read 43 MPH while Evankovich's, which had been thrown more than 100 away from the car, read 90. Evankovich was given a 2-year deferred sentence that December after pleading guilty to vehicular manslaughter. Almost two years later the widows of the three men filed a $2.25 million lawsuit against the Ford Motor Company for making a car with faulty power steering. The case was settled in 1971 with the plaintiffs being awarded approximately $300,000 by a district court. According to a witness at the trial, the speed of Evankovich's 1967 Ford Galaxie was never brought up.

After his death, North Dakota retired Casey's #12 and has never issued the number to another player. In 2011 the Fighting Sioux raised a banner to the roof with Casey's number, becoming only the second player in the history of the program to receive that honor.

== Career statistics ==
=== Regular season and playoffs ===
			Regular Season					Playoffs
Season	Team	League	GP	G	A	Pts	PIM	GP	G	A	Pts	PIM
1961–62	Great Falls High School	MT-HS	—	—	—	—	—	—	—	—	—	—
1963–64	North Dakota	WCHA	25	7	12	19	4	—	—	—	—	—
1964–65	North Dakota	WCHA	33	24	21	45	16	—	—	—	—	—
1965–66	North Dakota	WCHA	30	26	28	54	2	—	—	—	—	—
NCAA Totals			88	57	61	118	22	—	—	—	—	—

=== International ===
Year	Team	GP	G	A	Pts	PIM
1967	United States	7	2	0	2	2

== Awards and honors ==
Award	Year
All-WCHA First Team	1965–66
AHCA West All-American	1965–66
