= 1973–74 WHL season =

- League: Western Hockey League
- Sport: Ice hockey
- Games: 78
- Teams: 6

Regular season
- Season champions: Phoenix Roadrunners

President's Cup
- Champions: Phoenix Roadrunners
- Runners-up: Portland Buckaroos

Seasons
- 1972–73

The 1973–74 WHL season was the 22nd and final season of the Western Hockey League. The Phoenix Roadrunners were the President's Cup champions as they beat the Portland Buckaroos in five games in the final series.

== Teams ==
1973–74 Western Hockey League
Team	City	Arena	Capacity
Denver Spurs	Denver, Colorado	Denver Coliseum	8,140
Phoenix Roadrunners	Phoenix, Arizona	Arizona Veterans Memorial Coliseum	12,371
Portland Buckaroos	Portland, Oregon	Memorial Coliseum	12,000
Salt Lake Golden Eagles	Salt Lake City, Utah	Salt Palace	10,594
San Diego Gulls	San Diego, California	San Diego Sports Arena	12,920
Seattle Totems	Seattle, Washington	Seattle Center Coliseum	12,250

=== Map of teams ===
WHL Teams

== Final standings ==
Final Season Standings
R	Team	GP	W	L	T	GF	GA	Pts
**1**	**Phoenix Roadrunners**	**78**	**43**	**32**	**3**	**300**	**273**	**89**
**2**	**Salt Lake Golden Eagles**	**78**	**41**	**33**	**4**	**356**	**297**	**86**
**3**	**San Diego Gulls**	**78**	**40**	**33**	**5**	**278**	**281**	**85**
**4**	**Portland Buckaroos**	**78**	**39**	**33**	**6**	**292**	**258**	**84**
5	Seattle Totems	78	32	42	4	288	319	68
6	Denver Spurs	78	28	50	0	249	335	56

bold - qualified for playoffs

== Playoffs ==
Round 1
1	**Phoenix Roadrunners**	**4**
3	San Diego Gulls	0
2	Salt Lake Golden Eagles	1
4	**Portland Buckaroos**	**4**

Finals
1	**Phoenix Roadrunners**	**4**
4	Portland Buckaroos	1

The Phoenix Roadrunners win the President's Cup 4 games to 1.

== Player statistics ==
=== Scoring leaders ===
Note: GP = Games played, G = Goals, A = Assists, Pts = Points

Regular season leaders
Player	Team	GP	G	A	Pts
Lyle Bradley	Salt Lake	76	34	**81**	**115**
Murray Keogan	Phoenix	78	31	56	87
Danny Gloor	Seattle	76	36	48	84
Larry Patey	Salt Lake	76	40	43	83
Del Hall	Salt Lake	71	38	41	79
Art Jones	Portland	78	19	60	79
Howie Hughes	Portland	70	41	36	77
Ken Campbell	Portland	57	30	47	77
Dennis Giannini	Portland	77	**44**	31	75
Bob Collyard	Denver	65	27	47	74

== Awards ==
1973-74 WHL awards
Award	Recipient(s)
President's Cup	Phoenix Roadrunners
Outstanding Goalkeeper Award	Rick Charron
Leading Scorer Award	Lyle Bradley
George Leader Cup	Lyle Bradley
Rookie Award	Larry Patey
Fred J. Hume Cup	Andy Hebenton
