= Rick Yeo =

Canadian ice hockey player and coach

Biographical details
- Born: 1944 (age 81–82); Thunder Bay, Ontario, Canada
- Education: Michigan Tech

Playing career
- 1963–1966: Michigan Tech
- 1970–1971: Thunder Bay Twins
- Position: Forward

Coaching career (HC unless noted)
- 1973–1976: Michigan Tech (assistant)
- 1976–1981: Lake Superior State
- 1990–2005: Michigan Tech (AD)

Head coaching record
- Overall: 70-96-5 (.424)

Accomplishments and honors

Championships
- 1965 National Champion (player); 1975 National Champion (assistant)

Awards
- 1988 Michigan Tech Sports Hall of Fame

J. Richard Yeo (born 1944) is a Canadian former ice hockey player and coach who was also a member of Michigan Tech's administration for over 20 years.

== Career ==
Rick Yeo's first appearance in Houghton came as a player for Michigan Tech under John MacInnes. Recruited just after the Huskies first national title in 1962, Yeo was part of Michigan Tech's second championship in 1965, notching 2 assists in the final game against Boston College. After captaining the team in his senior season Yeo returned home to Thunder Bay and worked as a teacher and coach in the area. He made one final appearance on the ice for the Thunder Bay Twins in the team's inaugural season before ending his playing days for good.

In 1973 Yeo returned to his alma mater, becoming an assistant for the team and helping the Huskies to their third championship in 1975. Yeo was eventually hired as the head coach for Lake Superior State and served in that capacity from 1976 through the end of the 1980–81 season. Yeo was less successful that the two bench bosses that preceded him (Ron Mason and Rick Comley) but did achieve a modest amount of success with the Lakers in his five seasons.

Yeo was back in Houghton for the third time in the fall of 1981 becoming Director of Annual/Special Gifts for the Michigan Tech Fund, a position he held for eight years. A year after being inducted into the Michigan Tech Sports Hall of Fame in 1988 Yeo became director of alumni relations and then the school's Athletic Director in 1990. Yeo continued on as AD until 2005 when he accepted a new position as senior director of athletic development to help improve the financial foundation of the university's athletic department.

== Head coaching record ==
Record table
Season	Team	Overall	Conference	Standing	Postseason
Lake Superior State Lakers (CCHA) (1976–1981)
1976–77	Lake Superior State	10-23-0	3-13-0	5th	
1977–78	Lake Superior State	18-13-1	7-10-1	5th	
1978–79	Lake Superior State	16-18-2	11-12-1	4th	CCHA Semifinals
1979–80	Lake Superior State	12-21-1	2-18-0	6th	
1980–81	Lake Superior State	14-21-1	6-15-1	6th	
Lake Superior State:		70-96-5	29-68-3		
Total:		70-96-5			
National champion Postseason invitational champion Conference regular season champion Conference regular season and conference tournament champion Division regular season champion Division regular season and conference tournament champion Conference tournament champion
