= Terry Yurkiewicz =

Canadian ice hockey player

- Born: August 3, 1943; Cartier, Ontario, Canada
- Died: October 9, 2002 (aged 59)
- Height: 5 ft 9 in (175 cm)
- Weight: 160 lb (73 kg; 11 st 6 lb)
- Position: Goaltender
- Played for: Clarkson
- NHL draft: Undrafted
- Playing career: 1963–1966

Terrance A. Yurkiewicz was a Canadian ice hockey goaltender who was a two-time All-American for Clarkson.

== Career ==
Yurkiewicz joined the varsity team at Clarkson University in 1963 but a broken finger curtailed his first season. After he recovered he became the starting goaltender and led Clarkson to a third-place finish in ECAC Hockey. He was named to both the All-American and Second Team All-ECAC rosters. Clarkson finished the ECAC Tournament in fourth place and, despite the disappointing result, Yurkiewicz was named as the best goaltender of the tournament.

He was named as an alternate captain for his senior season and Yurkiewicz led Clarkson to one of the best seasons in program history. The team finished atop the conference standings, winning the first ECAC title in program history. Yurkiewicz was absolutely integral to Clarkson's success and was named as the ECAC Player of the Year. He was again outstanding in the conference tournament, allowing just 5 goals in 3 games as Clarkson won its first ECAC tournament championship. Yurkiewicz was named as the Most Outstanding Player in Tournament to add to his growing list of accolades.

Despite winning both ECAC titles, Clarkson only received the 2nd eastern seed for the 1966 NCAA Tournament. They faced a dangerous Denver squad in the semifinal and the two fought a close contest but the Golden Knights finished on top 4–3. Clarkson appeared in its second championship game against a surprising Michigan State team that entered postseason play with a losing record. Clarkson was 24–2 and favored in the game but Michigan State was riding a wave of momentum that saw them completely dominate the Golden Knights. MSU outshot Clarkson 50 to 24 in the game and despite the disparity in the skaters, Yurkiewicz kept his team in the game in the game through two periods. It was only until in the third when the Spartans pulled away with a 4-goal stanza.

The last Clarkson goalie to play without a mask (he did not wear one until his senior year), Yurkiewicz posted a .910 save percentage, 2.10 GAA, and a 43–10–0 record from 1963 to 1966.

Yurkiewicz was also a standout in the classroom, where he ranked first in his academic department. After his graduation from Clarkson in 1966 with a degree in business administration, he enjoyed great success in the business world, where he went on to serve as vice president and general manager of Albany Engineered Systems, a Division of Albany International. Yurkiewicz died in October 2002 at the age of 59. Yurkiewicz was posthumously honored by being inducted into the Clarkson Athletic Hall of Fame in 2007.

== Statistics ==
=== Regular season and playoffs ===
			Regular season									Playoffs
Season	Team	League	GP	W	L	T	MIN	GA	SO	GAA	SV%	GP	W	L	MIN	GA	SO	GAA	SV%
1963–64	Clarkson	ECAC Hockey	—	1	—	—	—	—	—	—	—	—	—	—	—	—	—	—	—
1964–65	Clarkson	ECAC Hockey	24	18	6	0	1366	—	1	2.66	.914	—	—	—	—	—	—	—	—
1965–66	Clarkson	ECAC Hockey	—	24	—	0	—	—	1	2.46	.906	—	—	—	—	—	—	—	—
NCAA totals			53	43	10	0	—	—	—	2.10	.910	—	—	—	—	—	—	—	—

== Awards and honors ==
Award	Year
All-ECAC Hockey Second Team	1964–65
AHCA East All-American	1964–65
ECAC Hockey All-Tournament First Team	1965
All-ECAC Hockey First Team	1965–66
AHCA East All-American	1965–66
ECAC Hockey All-Tournament First Team	1966
NCAA All-Tournament Second Team	1966

Awards and achievements
Preceded by John Cunniff	ECAC Hockey Player of the Year; 1965–66	Succeeded by Doug Ferguson
Preceded by Pat Murphy	ECAC Hockey Most Outstanding Player in Tournament; 1966	Succeeded by Doug Ferguson
