= Doug Volmar =

American ice hockey player

- Born: January 9, 1945 Cleveland, Ohio, U.S.
- Died: June 18, 2017 (aged 72)
- Height: 6 ft 1 in (185 cm)
- Weight: 218 lb (99 kg; 15 st 8 lb)
- Position: Right wing
- Shot: Right
- Played for: Detroit Red Wings; Los Angeles Kings; San Diego Mariners
- National team: United States
- Playing career: 1964–1975

Douglas Steven Volmar (January 9, 1945 – June 18, 2017) was an American ice hockey forward who played in 62 games in the National Hockey League with the Detroit Red Wings and Los Angeles Kings between 1970 and 1973. He also played briefly for the San Diego Mariners of the World Hockey Association during the 1974–75 season. Before turning professional he played for Michigan State University. Internationally Volmar played for the American national team at the 1968 Winter Olympics.

== Career statistics ==
=== Regular season and playoffs ===
			Regular season					Playoffs
Season	Team	League	GP	G	A	Pts	PIM	GP	G	A	Pts	PIM
1964–64	Cleveland Heights High School	HS-OH	—	—	—	—	—	—	—	—	—	—
1964–65	Michigan State University	B1G	29	27	9	36	21	—	—	—	—	—
1965–66	Michigan State University	B1G	29	26	28	54	57	—	—	—	—	—
1966–67	Michigan State University	B1G	32	21	12	33	100	—	—	—	—	—
1967–68	United States National Team	Intl	45	53	13	66	—	—	—	—	—	—
1968–69	Columbus Checkers	IHL	72	63	28	91	74	3	2	1	3	0
1969–70	Fort Worth Wings	CHL	67	30	23	53	75	7	4	1	5	2
1969–70	San Diego Gulls	WHL	—	—	—	—	—	2	0	3	3	0
1969–70	Detroit Red Wings	NHL	—	—	—	—	—	2	1	0	1	0
1970–71	Detroit Red Wings	NHL	2	0	1	1	2	—	—	—	—	—
1970–71	Springfield Kings	AHL	69	42	26	68	52	12	6	10	16	29
1971–72	Detroit Red Wings	NHL	39	9	5	14	8	—	—	—	—	—
1971–72	Tidewater Wings	AHL	20	8	8	16	8	—	—	—	—	—
1972–73	Los Angeles Kings	NHL	21	4	2	6	16	—	—	—	—	—
1973–74	Portland Buckaroos	WHL	3	0	4	4	5	—	—	—	—	—
1973–74	Springfield Kings	AHL	25	11	5	16	20	—	—	—	—	—
1973–74	Richmond Robins	AHL	22	13	7	20	10	5	3	4	7	2
1974–75	San Diego Mariners	WHA	10	0	1	1	4	—	—	—	—	—
1974–75	Syracuse Blazers	NAHL	47	40	32	72	47	7	4	4	8	0
WHA totals			10	0	1	1	4	—	—	—	—	—
NHL totals			62	13	8	21	26	2	1	0	1	0

=== International ===
Year	Team	Event	GP	G	A	Pts	PIM
1968	United States	OLY	7	5	0	5	4
Senior totals			7	5	0	5	4

== Awards and honors ==
Award	Year
All-WCHA First Team	1965–66
AHCA West All-American	1965–66
