= Gaye Cooley =

Canadian former ice hockey goaltender

- Born: July 6, 1946 (age 79) North Bay, Ontario, Canada
- Height: 5 ft 8 in (173 cm)
- Weight: 175 lb (79 kg; 12 st 7 lb)
- Position: Goaltender
- Caught: Left
- Played for: New England Whalers
- Playing career: 1967–1977

Gaye Cooley (born July 6, 1946 in North Bay, Ontario) is a Canadian former ice hockey goaltender.

Gaye Cooley played college hockey at Michigan State University. He was named as the Most Valuable Player of the 1966 NCAA Division I Men's Ice Hockey Tournament, which was won by Michigan State. After leaving Michigan State in 1967, Cooley began his professional career in the Eastern Hockey League with the Knoxville Knights and then moved to the International Hockey League with the Port Huron Flags and the Des Moines Oak Leafs. Cooley returned to the EHL with the Charlotte Checkers before moving to the American Hockey League's Rochester Americans but after one season he returned to the Checkers who were now playing in the Southern Hockey League, one of two leagues formed after the EHL folded. After three seasons, he moved to the Philadelphia Firebirds of the North American Hockey League, the other league formed from the EHL's closure, and then the New England Whalers of the World Hockey Association before finishing his career with one more season with the Checkers.

Cooley played just three seconds of major-league hockey, coming on as a substitute for Cap Raeder in a WHA playoff game on May 11, 1976 against the Houston Aeros. He was one of the last minor league goaltenders to not wear a mask.

== Career statistics ==
=== Regular season and playoffs ===
			Regular season									Playoffs
Season	Team	League	GP	W	L	T	MIN	GA	SO	GAA	SV%	GP	W	L	MIN	GA	SO	GAA	SV%
1962–63	North Bay Trappers	NOJHL	Statistics Unavailable
1963–64	North Bay Trappers	NOJHL	Statistics Unavailable
1965–66	Michigan State University	WCHA	18	--	--	--	--	56	0	3.10	.903	—	—	—	—	—	—	—	—
1966–67	Michigan State University	WCHA	24	--	--	--	--	95	0	4.00	.897	—	—	—	—	—	—	—	—
1967–68	Knoxville Knights	EHL	48	17	26	5	2880	182	0	3.79	.894	—	—	—	—	—	—	—	—
1967–68	Port Huron Flags	IHL	1	0	0	0	29	4	0	8.33	--	—	—	—	—	—	—	—	—
1968–69	Port Huron Flags	IHL	62	--	--	--	3489	222	1	3.82	--	3	—	—	—	—	—	—
1969–70	Des Moines Oak Leafs	IHL	50	--	--	--	--	--	--	--	--	--	--	--	--	--	--	--	--
1970–71	Des Moines Oak Leafs	IHL	53	--	--	--	3138	165	2	3.15	--	7	—	—	—	—	—	—	—
1971–72	Charlotte Checkers	EHL	48	--	--	--	--	114	6	2.37	--	14	—	—	—	—	—	—	—
1972–73	Boston Braves	AHL	—	—	—	—	—	—	—	—	—	—	—	—	—	—	—	—	—
1972–73	Rochester Americans	AHL	24	--	--	--	1272	78	0	3.67	--	1	—	—	—	—	—	—	—
1973–74	Charlotte Checkers	SHL	51	30	19	1	3012	156	3	3.09	.909	9	—	—	—	—	—	—	—
1974–75	Charlotte Checkers	SHL	33	24	8	0	1898	103	2	3.26	.907	8	—	—	—	—	—	—	—
1975–76	Charlotte Checkers	SHL	47	27	12	7	2703	127	5	2.82	.921	4	2	2	240	11	1	2.75	.913
1975–76	Philadelphia Firebirds	NAHL	—	—	—	—	—	—	—	—	—	8	6	2	471	39	0	4.97	--
1975–76	New England Whalers	WHA	—	—	—	—	—	—	—	—	—	1	—	—		0	—	—	—
1976–77	Charlotte Checkers	SHL	2	0	1	0	84	6	0	4.29	.889	—	—	—	—	—	—	—	—
WHA totals			—	—	—	—	—	—	—	—	—	1	—	—	—	0	—	—	—

== Awards and honors ==
Award	Year
All-NCAA All-Tournament First Team	1966

Awards and achievements
Preceded by Gary Milroy	NCAA Tournament Most Outstanding Player; 1966	Succeeded by Skip Stanowski
