= 1965 WCHA men's ice hockey tournament =

1965 WCHA Men's ice hockey tournament
- Dates: March 5–13, 1965
- Teams: 4
- Finals site: Winter Sports Building; Grand Forks, North Dakota
- Champions: Michigan Tech (3rd title)
- Winning coach: John MacInnes (3rd title)
- WCHA Men's Ice Hockey Tournaments

The 1965 WCHA Men's Ice Hockey Tournament was the 6th conference playoff in league history. The tournament was played between March 5 and March 13, 1965. All games were played at home team campus sites. By reaching the title game both Michigan Tech and North Dakota were invited to participate in the 1965 NCAA University Division Men's Ice Hockey Tournament.

This was the final season that the WCHA named a single tournament champion until 1977.

== Format ==
The top four teams in the WCHA, based upon the conference regular season standings, were eligible for the tournament and were seeded No. 1 through No. 4. In the first round the first and fourth seeds and the second and third seeds were matched in two-game series where the school that scored the higher number of goals was declared the winner. The winners advanced to the title game which was to be played at the higher remaining seed's home venue.

=== Conference standings ===
Note: GP = Games played; W = Wins; L = Losses; T = Ties; PCT = Winning percentage; GF = Goals for; GA = Goals against

1964–65 Western Collegiate Hockey Association standings
	Conference							Overall					
	GP	W	L	T	PCT	GF	GA	GP	W	L	T	GF	GA
North Dakota†	16	13	3	0	.813	75	48	33	25	8	0	184	106
Michigan Tech*	18	12	5	1	.694	78	47	31	24	5	2	153	82
Minnesota	18	10	8	0	.556	86	78	28	14	12	2	137	121
Michigan State	14	7	7	0	.500	69	61	29	17	12	0	165	118
Michigan	18	7	11	0	.389	68	94	26	13	12	1	110	122
Denver	12	4	7	1	.375	34	37	28	18	8	2	144	74
Colorado College	16	2	14	0	.125	51	96	25	7	17	1	96	132
Championship: Michigan Tech † indicates conference regular season champion * indicates conference tournament champion

== Bracket ==
First Round; March 5–6
1	North Dakota	7	4	11
4	Michigan State	1	6	7
2	Michigan Tech	8	3	11
3	Minnesota	4	3	7

Final; March 13
1	North Dakota	4
2	Michigan Tech	6

Note: * denotes overtime period(s)

=== First round ===
==== (1) North Dakota vs. (4) Michigan State ====
March 5	North Dakota	7 – 1	Michigan State	Winter Sports Building

March 6	North Dakota	4 – 6	Michigan State	Winter Sports Building

North Dakota won series 11–7

==== (2) Michigan Tech vs. (3) Minnesota ====
March 5	Michigan Tech	8 – 4	Minnesota	Dee Stadium

March 6	Michigan Tech	3 – 3	Minnesota	Dee Stadium

Michigan Tech won series 11–7

=== Final ===
==== (1) North Dakota vs. (2) Michigan Tech ====
March 13	North Dakota	4 – 6	Michigan Tech	Winter Sports Building

== Tournament awards ==
None

== See also ==
- Western Collegiate Hockey Association men's champions
