= Thomas Hurley (ice hockey) =

American ice hockey player

Tom Hurley
- Born: August 29, 1944 (age 81) Massena, NY, USA
- Height: 6 ft 1 in (185 cm)
- Weight: 201 lb (91 kg; 14 st 5 lb)
- Position: Center
- National team: United States
- Playing career: 1954–1969

Thomas Francis Hurley (born August 29, 1944) is an American former ice hockey defenseman and Olympian.

Hurley played with Team USA at the 1968 Winter Olympics held in Grenoble, France. He previously played for the Clarkson Golden Knights at Clarkson University.
