= Demonstration Hall =

Michigan State University building

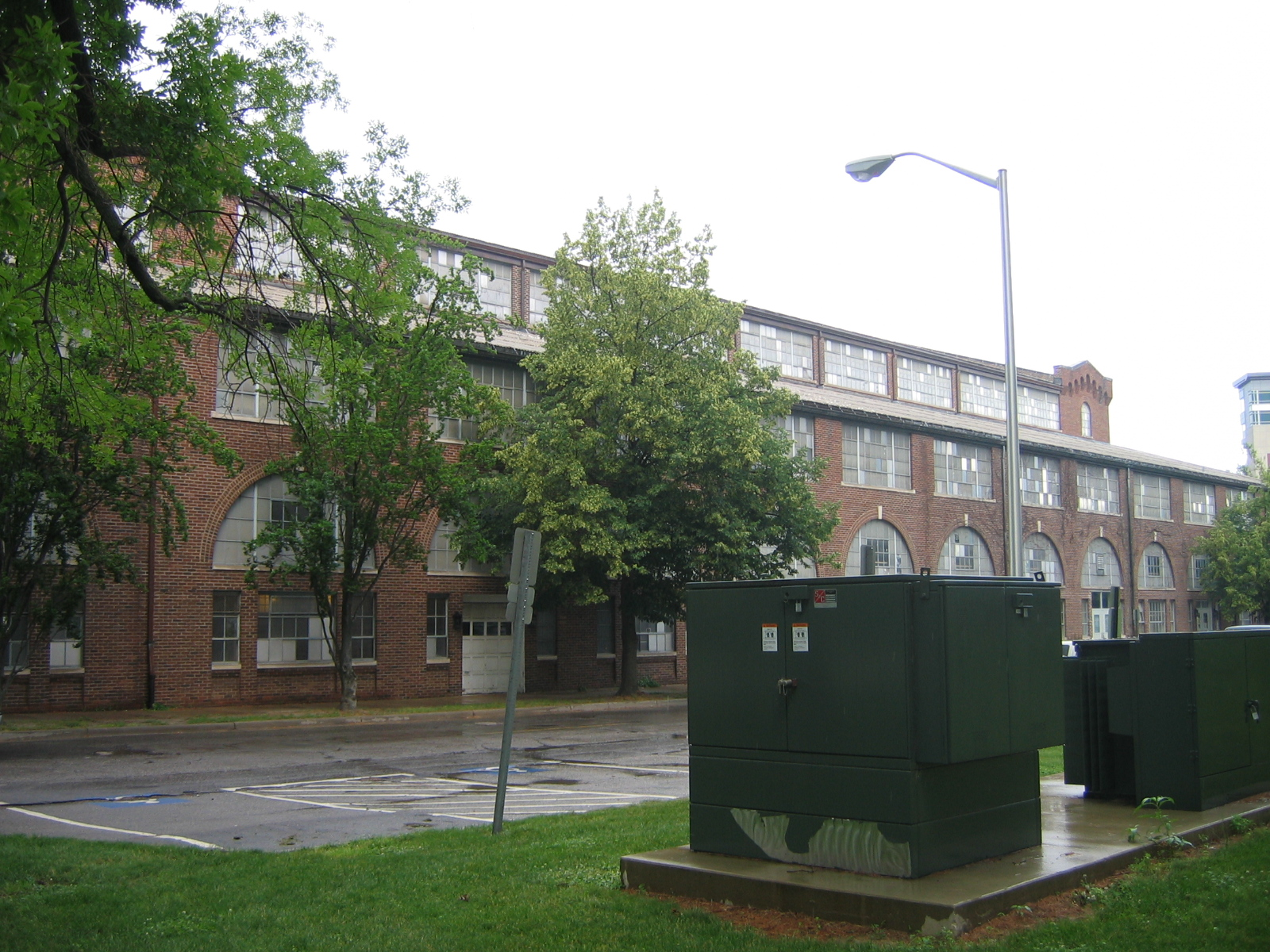
- Interactive map of the Demonstration Hall area

General information
- Type: Intercollegiate athletics, intramural sports, ROTC
- Architectural style: Romanesque Revival
- Location: Michigan State University, Athletic complex
- Coordinates: 42.729629°N 84.488699°W
- Completed: 1928

Technical details
- Floor area: 86,627 sq ft (8,047.9 m^{2})

Design and construction
- Architect: Bowd–Munson

Website
- MSU Demonstration Hall

Demonstration Hall is a structure on the campus of Michigan State University. It was built in 1928 with offices, classrooms, and a riding arena for the Military Science department as a replacement for the Armory (built 1885, razed 1939). Exhibitions of agricultural stock and implements were held here, as well as athletic events. It served as the home court for the Michigan State Spartans men's basketball team from 1930 to 1940, and the ice rink for the Michigan State Spartans men's ice hockey team from 1949 until Munn Ice Arena was completed in 1974.

Today it continues to act as a drill hall for ROTC as well as providing rehearsal space and equipment storage for the Spartan Marching Band. The Bike Project is housed in the basement. Additionally, the arena that formerly held an ice rink now holds an indoor hard rink, used for both roller hockey and indoor soccer.

Demonstration Hall is located at the south end of Demonstration Field, home to the practices of the Spartan Marching Band. Demonstration Field also plays host to the Sparty Spring Party, hosted each spring by the University Activities Board and Residence Halls Association. During Sparty Spring Party, the field is often the site of a large outdoor concert. The stage faces north, which allows the backstage area to connect to Demonstration Hall, and allows rooms in the hall to be used by artists and workers, and can serve as a green room.

The north end of Demonstration Field is home to The Spartan. Demonstration Hall serves as the backdrop for most views and pictures of the statue. When the statue area was reconstructed in 2005, the old checkered windows on the north side of Demonstration Hall were replaced with matching glass so that the building was a more aesthetically pleasing backdrop to the new statue. In 2008 the building's multipurpose room was renovated into a marching band rehearsal space called Band Hall.

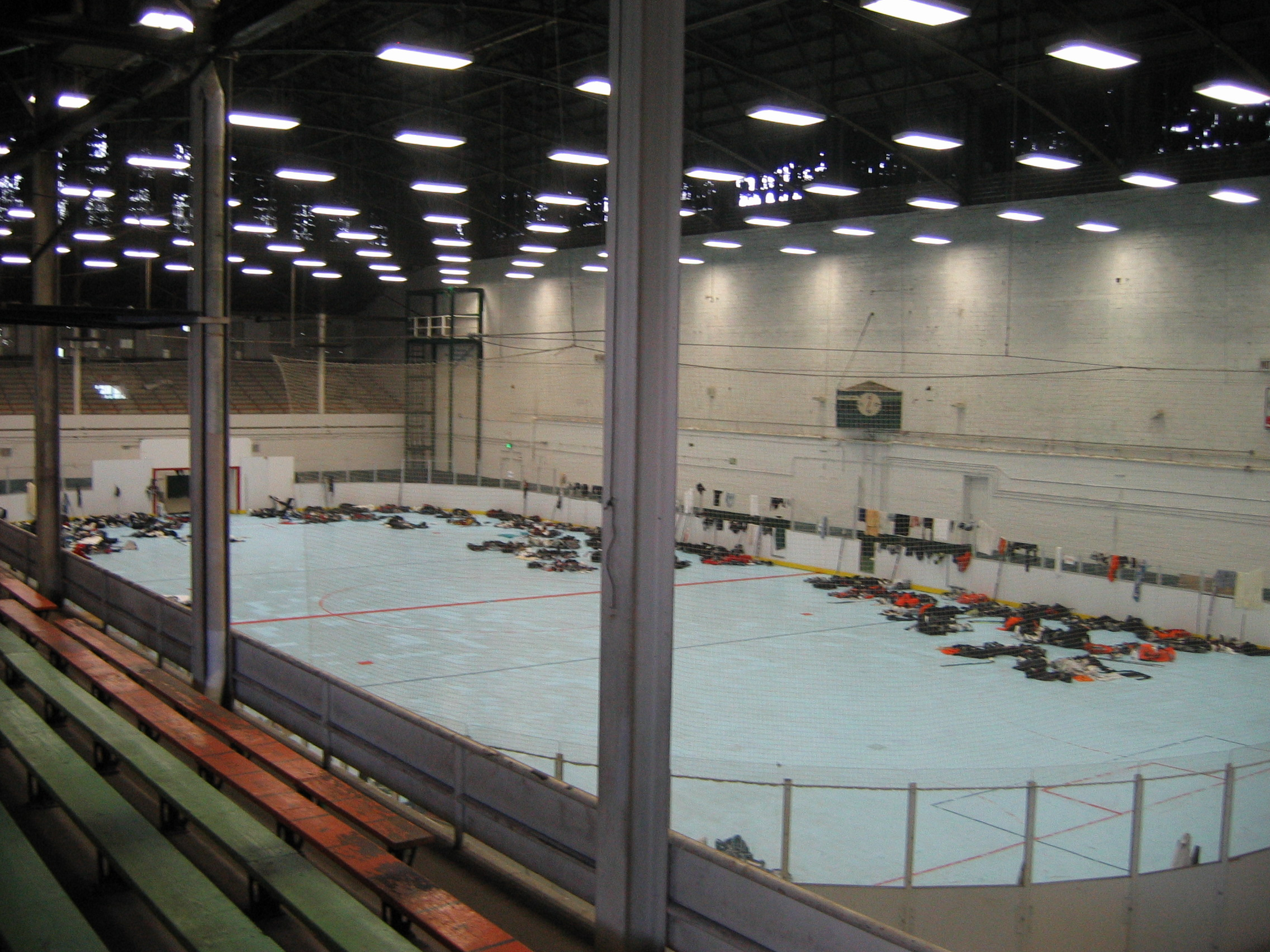
2008
