= List of Providence Friars men's ice hockey seasons =

This is a season-by-season list of records compiled by Providence in men's ice hockey.

Providence College has won one NCAA Championship in its history

== Season-by-season results ==
Note: GP = Games played, W = Wins, L = Losses, T = Ties

NCAA D-I Champions	NCAA Frozen Four	Conference regular season champions	Conference Division Champions	Conference Playoff Champions

Season	Conference	Regular Season (Note: Code explanation; GP—Games Played, W—Wins, L—Losses, T—Tied games, OTW—Overtime Wins, OTL—Overtime Loses, 3/SW—Win in 3 on 3 overtime or shootout, Pts—Points*)														Conference Tournament Results	National Tournament Results
Season	Conference	Conference									Overall					Conference Tournament Results	National Tournament Results
Season	Conference	GP	W	L	T	OTW	OTL	3/SW	Pts*	Finish	GP	W	L	T	%	Conference Tournament Results	National Tournament Results
Joseph Landry, John Graham, Clement Trihey† (1926–1927)
1926–27	Independent	–	–	–	–	–	–	–	–	–	8	1	7	0	.125		
Program suspended due to lack of ice
Dick Rondeau (1952–1956)
1952–53	Independent	–	–	–	–	–	–	–	–	–	14	6	8	0	.429		
1953–54	Independent	–	–	–	–	–	–	–	–	–	14	4	10	0	.286		
1954–55	NEHL	5	4	1	0	–	–	–	.800	–	15	8	7	0	.533		
1955–56	Independent	–	–	–	–	–	–	–	–	–	23	7	16	0	.304		
Tom Eccleston (1956–1964)
1956–57	Independent	–	–	–	–	–	–	–	–	–	18	11	7	0	.611		
1957–58	Independent	–	–	–	–	–	–	–	–	–	22	11	11	0	.500		
1958–59	Independent	–	–	–	–	–	–	–	–	–	21	7	13	1	.357		
1959–50	Independent	–	–	–	–	–	–	–	–	–	20	11	9	0	.550		
1960–61	Independent	–	–	–	–	–	–	–	–	–	20	11	9	0	.550		
1961–62	ECAC Hockey	17	8	7	2	–	–	–	.529	14th	21	11	8	2	.571	Lost Quarterfinal, 3–6 (Clarkson)	
1962–63	ECAC Hockey	19	13	4	2	–	–	–	.737	5th	23	13	8	2	.609	Lost Quarterfinal, 1–2 (OT) (St. Lawrence)	
1963–64	ECAC Hockey	19	16	3	0	–	–	–	.842	1st	26	19	7	0	.731	Won Quarterfinal, 3–2 (OT) (Colgate); Won Semifinal, 6–4 (Clarkson); Won Championship, 3–1 (St. Lawrence)	Lost Semifinal, 1–4 (Denver); Lost Third-place game, 1–2 (Rensselaer)
University Division
Zellio Toppazzini (1964–1968)
1964–65	ECAC Hockey	17	7	9	1	–	–	–	.441	8th	26	14	11	1	.558	Lost Quarterfinal, 3–5 (Boston University)	
1965–66	ECAC Hockey	14	2	12	0	–	–	–	.133	14th	21	7	14	0	.333		
1966–67	ECAC Hockey	15	2	13	0	–	–	–	.133	14th	20	3	17	0	.150		
1967–68	ECAC Hockey	16	3	13	0	–	–	–	.188	15th	25	7	18	0	.280		
Lou Lamoriello (1968–1983)
1968–69	ECAC Hockey	15	4	11	0	–	–	–	.267	14th	21	7	14	0	.333		
1969–70	ECAC Hockey	19	7	10	2	–	–	–	.421	10th	25	11	12	2	.480		
1970–71	ECAC Hockey	19	12	7	0	–	–	–	.632	6th	28	17	11	0	.607	Lost Quarterfinal, 3–6 (Cornell)	
1971–72	ECAC Hockey	17	9	8	0	–	–	–	.529	8th	24	14	9	1	.604	Lost Quarterfinal, 1–11 (Cornell)	
1972–73	ECAC Hockey	17	6	11	0	–	–	–	.353	14th	25	11	14	0	.440		
Division I
1973–74	ECAC Hockey	19	9	9	1	–	–	–	.500	7th	26	14	11	1	.558	Lost Quarterfinal, 3–9 (Harvard)	
1974–75	ECAC Hockey	19	12	6	1	–	–	–	.658	6th	27	19	7	1	.722	Lost Quarterfinal, 5–7 (Vermont)	
1975–76	ECAC Hockey	25	11	12	2	–	–	–	.480	9th	31	14	15	2	.484		
1976–77	ECAC Hockey	25	14	11	0	–	–	–	.560	8th	30	17	13	0	.567	Lost Quarterfinal, 3–6 (Clarkson)	
1977–78	ECAC Hockey	23	12	9	2	–	–	–	.565	7th	34	17	15	2	.529	Won Quarterfinal, 8–5 (Cornell); Won Semifinal, 5–1 (Boston University); Lost Championship, 2–4 (Boston College)	Lost First round, 3–5 (Boston University)
1978–79	ECAC Hockey	24	13	9	0	–	–	–	.591	6th	28	16	10	2	.607	Lost Quarterfinal, 5–6 (OT) (Cornell)	
1979–80	ECAC Hockey	23	17	6	0	–	–	–	.739	2nd	32	21	11	0	.656	Won Quarterfinal, 8–3 (Colgate); Lost Semifinal, 5–6 (Cornell); Won Third-place game, 6–5 (OT) (Clarkson)	
1980–81	ECAC Hockey	22	12	9	1	–	–	–	.568	T–6th	33	17	15	1	.530	Won Quarterfinal, 5–2 (Boston College); Won Semifinal, 4–3 (OT) (Clarkson); Won Championship, 8–4 (Cornell)	Lost Quarterfinal series, 8–13 (Michigan State)
1981–82	ECAC Hockey	21	13	8	0	–	–	–	.619	T–4th	33	20	12	1	.621	Lost Quarterfinal, 2–4 (New Hampshire)	
1982–83	ECAC Hockey	21	16	5	0	–	–	–	.762	1st	43	33	10	0	.767	Won Quarterfinal series, 2–0 (Yale); Won Semifinal, 1–0 (St. Lawrence); Lost Championship, 1–4 (Harvard)	Won Quarterfinal series, 10–5 (Minnesota–Duluth); Lost Semifinal, 0–2 (Wisconsin); Won Third-place game, 4–3 (Minnesota)
Steve Stirling (1983–1985)
1983–84	ECAC Hockey	21	12	7	2	–	–	–	.619	T–5th	35	21	12	2	.629	Lost Quarterfinal series, 1–2 (Boston College)	
1984–85	Hockey East	34	15	14	5	–	–	–	35	3rd	45	23	17	5	.567	Won Quarterfinal series, 2–0 (Northeastern); Won Semifinal, 5–2 (Boston University); Won Championship, 2–1 (2OT) (Boston College)	Won Quarterfinal series, 6–5 (Michigan State); Won Semifinal, 4–3 (3OT) (Boston College); Lost Championship, 1–2 (Rensselaer)
Mike McShane (1985–1994)
1985–86	Hockey East	34	11	22	1	–	–	–	23	4th	39	14	24	1	.372	Won Quarterfinal series, 10–6 (Maine); Lost Semifinal, 2–3 (Boston University); Lost Consolation Game, 5–8 (Lowell)	
1986–87	Hockey East	32	7	22	3	–	–	–	17	6th	33	7	23	3	.258	Lost Quarterfinal, 2–3 (Maine)	
1987–88	Hockey East	26	8	13	5	–	–	–	21	6th	36	13	18	5	.431	Won Quarterfinal series, 9–6 (Boston University); Lost Semifinal series, 7–17 (Maine)	
1988–89	Hockey East	26	13	11	2	–	–	–	28	T–3rd	42	22	18	2	.548	Won Quarterfinal, 3–2 (Boston University); Lost Semifinal, 5–6 (2OT) (Boston College); Won Consolation Game, 3–2 (Northeastern)	Won First round series, 2–1 (Northern Michigan); Lost Quarterfinal series, 1–2 (Maine)
1989–90	Hockey East	21	11	7	3	–	–	–	25	4th	35	22	10	3	.671	Lost Quarterfinal series, 1–2 (New Hampshire)	
1990–91	Hockey East	21	10	9	2	–	–	–	22	T–4th	36	22	12	2	.639	Won Quarterfinal, 4–1 (New Hampshire); Lost Semifinal, 5–7 (Boston University)	Lost First round series, 1–2 (Minnesota)
1991–92	Hockey East	21	11	8	2	–	–	–	24	3rd	36	21	13	2	.611	Won Quarterfinal, 7–0 (Massachusetts–Lowell); Lost Semifinal, 3–5 (New Hampshire)	
1992–93	Hockey East	24	9	12	3	–	–	–	21	T–4th	36	16	16	4	.500	Lost Quarterfinal series, 0–1–1 (Massachusetts–Lowell)	
1993–94	Hockey East	24	9	13	2	–	–	–	20	5th	36	14	19	3	.431	Lost Quarterfinal series, 0–2 (Northeastern)	
Paul Pooley (1994–2005)
1994–95	Hockey East	24	7	11	6	–	–	3	50	6th	37	14	17	6	.459	Won Quarterfinal, 3–2 (OT) (New Hampshire); Won Semifinal, 7–3 (Maine); Lost Championship, 2–3 (Boston University)	
1995–96	Hockey East	24	12	9	3	–	–	0	66	4th	39	21	15	3	.577	Won Quarterfinal series, 2–0 (Boston College); Won Semifinal, 5–4 (Boston University); Won Championship, 3–2 (Maine)	Lost Regional Quarterfinal, 1–5 (Minnesota)
1996–97	Hockey East	24	12	11	1	–	–	–	25	4th	36	15	20	1	.431	Lost Quarterfinal series, 0–2 (Massachusetts–Lowell)	
1997–98	Hockey East	24	9	13	2	–	–	–	20	7th	36	15	18	3	.458	Lost Quarterfinal series, 0–2 (Boston College)	
1998–99	Hockey East	24	12	11	1	–	–	–	25	4th	38	20	17	1	.539	Won Quarterfinal series, 2–1 (Boston University); Lost Semifinal, 2–6 (New Hampshire)	
1999–00	Hockey East	24	10	13	1	–	–	–	21	T–5th	38	18	18	2	.500	Lost Quarterfinal series, 0–2 (Maine)	
2000–01	Hockey East	24	13	8	3	–	–	–	29	T–2nd	40	22	13	5	.613	Won Quarterfinal series, 2–1 (Boston University); Won Semifinal, 4–3 (Maine); Lost Championship, 3–5 (Boston College)	Lost Regional Quarterfinal, 1–4 (Wisconsin)
2001–02	Hockey East	24	8	13	3	–	–	–	19	7th	38	13	20	5	.408	Lost Quarterfinal series, 0–2 (Boston University)	
2002–03	Hockey East	24	12	9	3	–	–	–	27	T–4th	36	19	14	3	.569	Lost Quarterfinal series, 0–2 (Boston University)	
2003–04	Hockey East	24	7	11	6	–	–	–	20	5th	37	16	14	7	.527	Lost Quarterfinal series, 1–2 (New Hampshire)	
2004–05	Hockey East	24	6	14	4	–	–	–	16	7th	37	12	21	4	.378	Lost Quarterfinal series, 1–2 (Boston University)	
Tim Army (2005–2011)
2005–06	Hockey East	27	14	10	3	–	–	–	31	5th	36	17	16	3	.514	Lost Quarterfinal series, 0–2 (New Hampshire)	
2006–07	Hockey East	27	9	15	3	–	–	–	21	8th	36	10	23	3	.319	Lost Quarterfinal series, 0–2 (New Hampshire)	
2007–08	Hockey East	27	11	11	5	–	–	–	27	5th	36	14	17	5	.458	Lost Quarterfinal series, 0–2 (Boston College)	
2008–09	Hockey East	27	4	18	5	–	–	–	13	T–9th	34	7	22	5	.279		
2009–10	Hockey East	27	5	18	4	–	–	–	14	10th	34	10	20	4	.353		
2010–11	Hockey East	27	4	16	7	–	–	–	15	9th	34	8	18	8	.353		
Nate Leaman (2011–Present)
2011–12	Hockey East	27	10	14	3	–	–	–	23	7th	38	14	20	4	.421	Won Quarterfinal series, 2–1 (Massachusetts–Lowell); Lost Semifinal, 2–4 (Boston College)	
2012–13	Hockey East	27	13	8	6	–	–	–	32	T–3rd	38	17	14	7	.539	Won Quarterfinal series, 2–1 (New Hampshire); Lost Semifinal, 1–2 (Massachusetts–Lowell)	
2013–14	Hockey East	20	11	7	2	–	–	–	24	3rd	39	22	11	6	.641	Won Quarterfinal series, 2–0 (Maine); Lost Semifinal, 1–3 (New Hampshire)	Won Regional semifinal, 4–0 (Quinnipiac); Lost Regional Final, 1–3 (Union)
2014–15	Hockey East	22	13	8	1	–	–	–	27	T–2nd	41	26	13	2	.659	Lost Quarterfinal series, 1–2 (New Hampshire)	Won Regional semifinal, 7–5 (Miami); Won Regional Final, 4–1 (Denver); Won National semifinal, 4–1 (Omaha); Won National Championship, 4–3 (Boston University)
2015–16	Hockey East	22	16	3	3	–	–	–	35	T–1st	38	27	7	4	.763	Won Quarterfinal series, 2–0 (Merrimack); Lost Semifinal, 1–2 (3OT) (Massachusetts–Lowell)	Lost Regional semifinal, 1–2 (2OT) (Minnesota–Duluth)
2016–17	Hockey East	22	12	7	3	–	–	–	27	5th	39	22	12	5	.628	Won Opening Round series, 2–0 (Massachusetts); Lost Quarterfinal series, 0–2 (Notre Dame)	Lost Regional semifinal, 0–3 (Harvard)
2017–18	Hockey East	24	13	7	4	–	–	–	30	3rd	40	24	12	4	.650	Won Quarterfinal series, 2–0 (Maine); Won Semifinal, 3–2 (OT) (Northeastern); Lost Championship, 0–2 (Boston University)	Won Regional semifinal, 1–0 (Clarkson); Lost Regional Final, 1–2 (Notre Dame)
2018–19	Hockey East	24	14	7	3	–	–	–	31	T–2nd	42	24	12	6	.643	Lost Quarterfinal series, 1–2 (Boston College)	Won Regional semifinal, 6–3 (Minnesota State); Won Regional Final, 4–0 (Cornell); Lost National semifinal, 1–4 (Minnesota–Duluth)
2019–20	Hockey East	24	10	11	3	–	–	–	23	T–7th	34	16	12	6	.559	Tournament Cancelled	
2020–21	Hockey East	23	10	8	5	0	0	2	.536	5th	25	11	9	5	.540	Won Quarterfinal, 6–1 (Connecticut); Lost Semifinal, 2–5 (Massachusetts)	
2021–22	Hockey East	24	12	11	1	1	1	1	38	7th	38	22	14	2	.605	Won Opening Round, 2–1 (Vermont); Lost Quarterfinal, 2–4 (Massachusetts)	
2022–23	Hockey East	24	9	9	6	3	0	2	32	T–6th	37	16	14	7	.527	Won Opening Round, 2–1 (OT) (New Hampshire); Won Quarterfinal, 2–1 (OT) (Northeastern); Lost Semifinal, 1–2 (OT) (Boston University)	
2023–24	Hockey East	24	11	9	4	3	1	2	37	4th	35	18	13	4	.571	Lost Quarterfinal, 1–3 (Massachusetts)	
2024–25	Hockey East	24	11	8	5	2	2	1	39	5th	37	21	11	5	.635	Lost Quarterfinal, 1–3 (Connecticut)	Lost Regional semifinal, 1–5 (Denver)
Totals											GP	W	L	T	%	Championships	
Regular Season											2160	1049	926	185	.528	2 ECAC Hockey Championships, 1 Hockey East Championship	
Conference Post-season											131	59	71	1	.454	2 ECAC Hockey tournament championships, 2 Hockey East tournament championships	
NCAA Post-season											38	17	21	0	.447	15 NCAA Tournament appearances	
Regular Season and Post-season Record											2319	1125	1018	186	.523	1 National Championship	

* Winning percentage is used when conference schedules are unbalanced.
† Providence has three separate people serve as head coach during their first official season.
