= Dort Financial Center =

Hockey arena in Flint, Michigan

Coordinates: 43°0′40″N 83°38′31″W

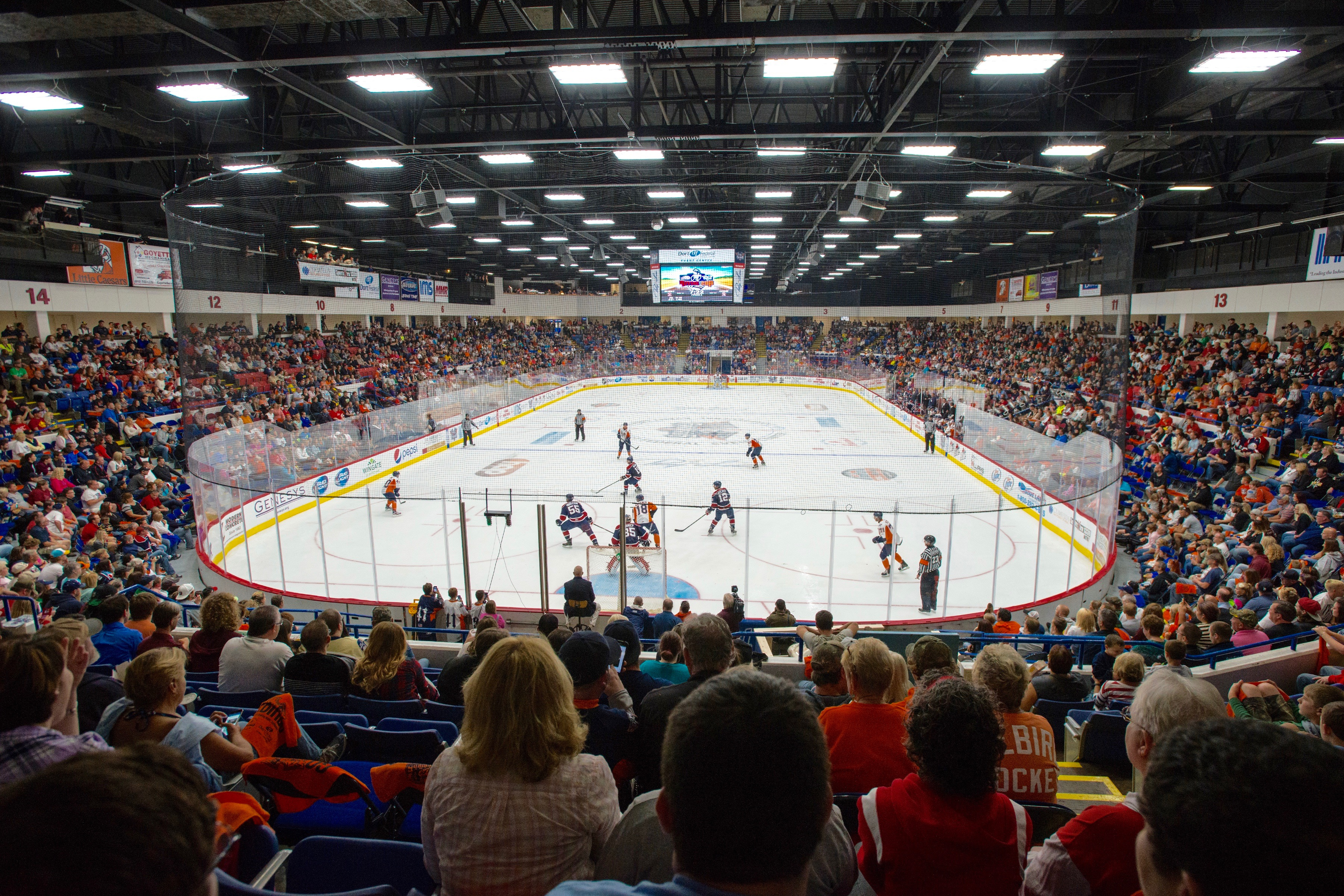

- Location within Michigan Location within the United States
- Former names: IMA (1969–2003); Perani Arena and Event Center (2003–15)
- Address: 3501 Lapeer Rd; Flint, MI 48503-4500
- Owner: IMS Hockey Corp.
- Operator: IMS Hockey Management, LLC
- Capacity: Main Arena: 4,421 Concerts: General admission: 6,469; In the round: 4,800; End stage: 4,567; Sports: Boxing: 5,109; Basketball: 4,421; Hockey: 4,365; Other: Circus: 4,821; Ice show: 3,535; Banquet/reception: 2,000

Construction
- Groundbreaking: 1967
- Opened: October 1969
- Cost: $10 million ($96.6 million in 2025 dollars)

The Dort Financial Center (originally IMA Sports Arena and formerly Perani Arena and Event Center) is a sports, entertainment and convention venue located in Flint, Michigan, United States. It opened in 1969 and is the home of the Flint Firebirds who play in the Ontario Hockey League.

== Facilities ==
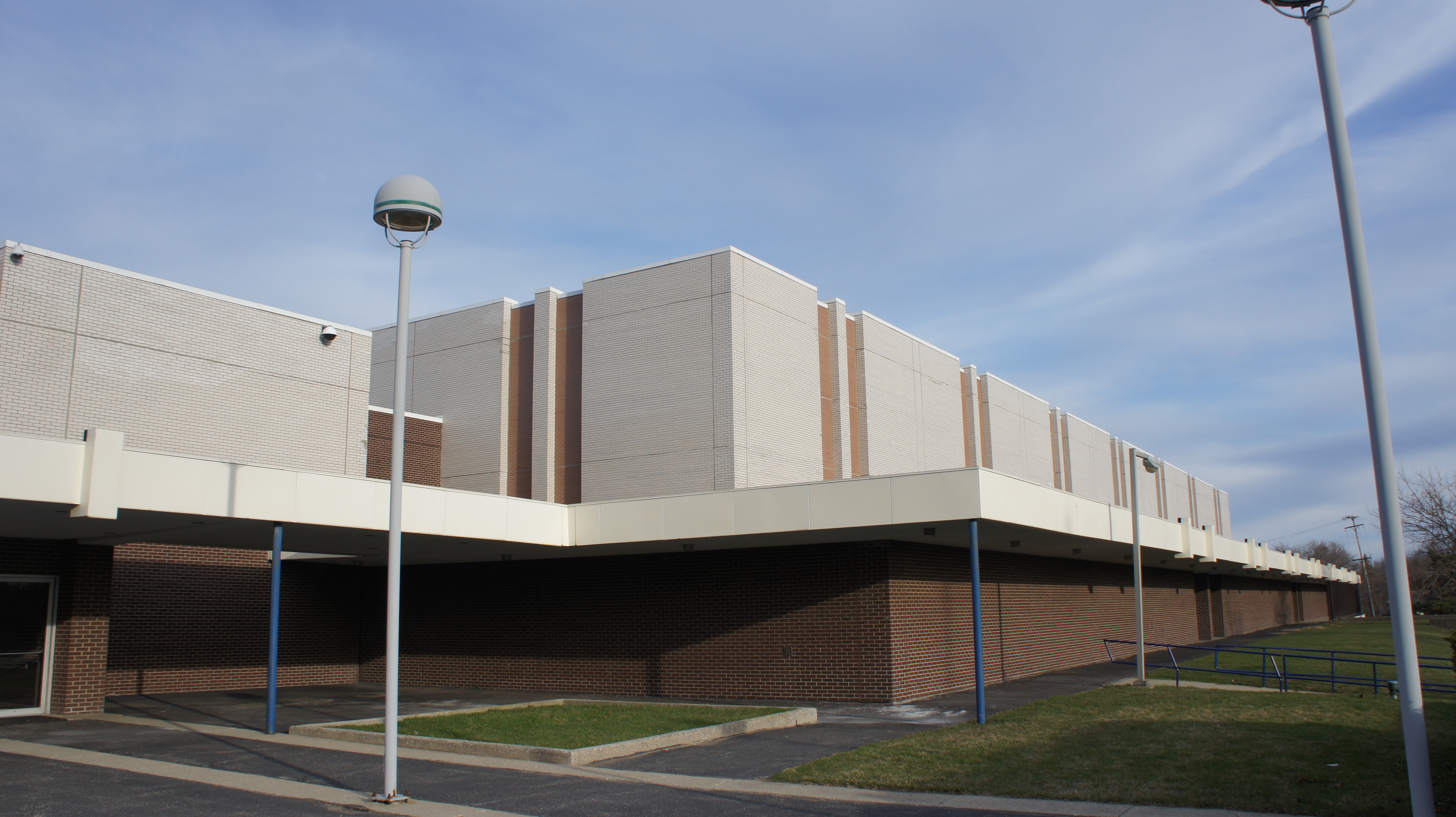
Exterior

The main arena of the complex, the largest exhibit hall of complex, features 29,280 square feet (2,720 m^{2}) of space and can accommodate 4,021 for ice hockey and 6,069 for concerts, plus 400 in standing room. The second arena in the complex features 27,206 square feet (2,527.5 m^{2}) of space. Both arenas are frequently used for trade shows, conventions, hockey games and other sports. In addition, the main arena is used for concerts.

Initially named the IMA, an acronym for the Industrial Mutual Association. Being the second such complex in Flint called the IMA, The IMA Auditorium was turned into part of the AutoWorld complex.

The complex was named for Bob Perani, owner of Perani's Hockey World, a sports equipment retailer in Flint. Perani's Hockey World paid for naming rights to the complex. Bob Perani was a goalie for the Flint Generals from 1969 to 1974. His jersey, #1, is one of only five numbers retired by the team.

In 2020, the Dort Financial Center underwent renovations and updating. Renovations included updated seating in the main arena, as well as LED ribbon panels that would encircle the entire arena. The updated black leather seats, as well as the LED panels, were both acquired from The Palace of Auburn Hills before it was demolished. The renovations gave the arena a uniform seating appearance, while the LED panels are capable of displaying advertisements and sports scoreboards simultaneously.

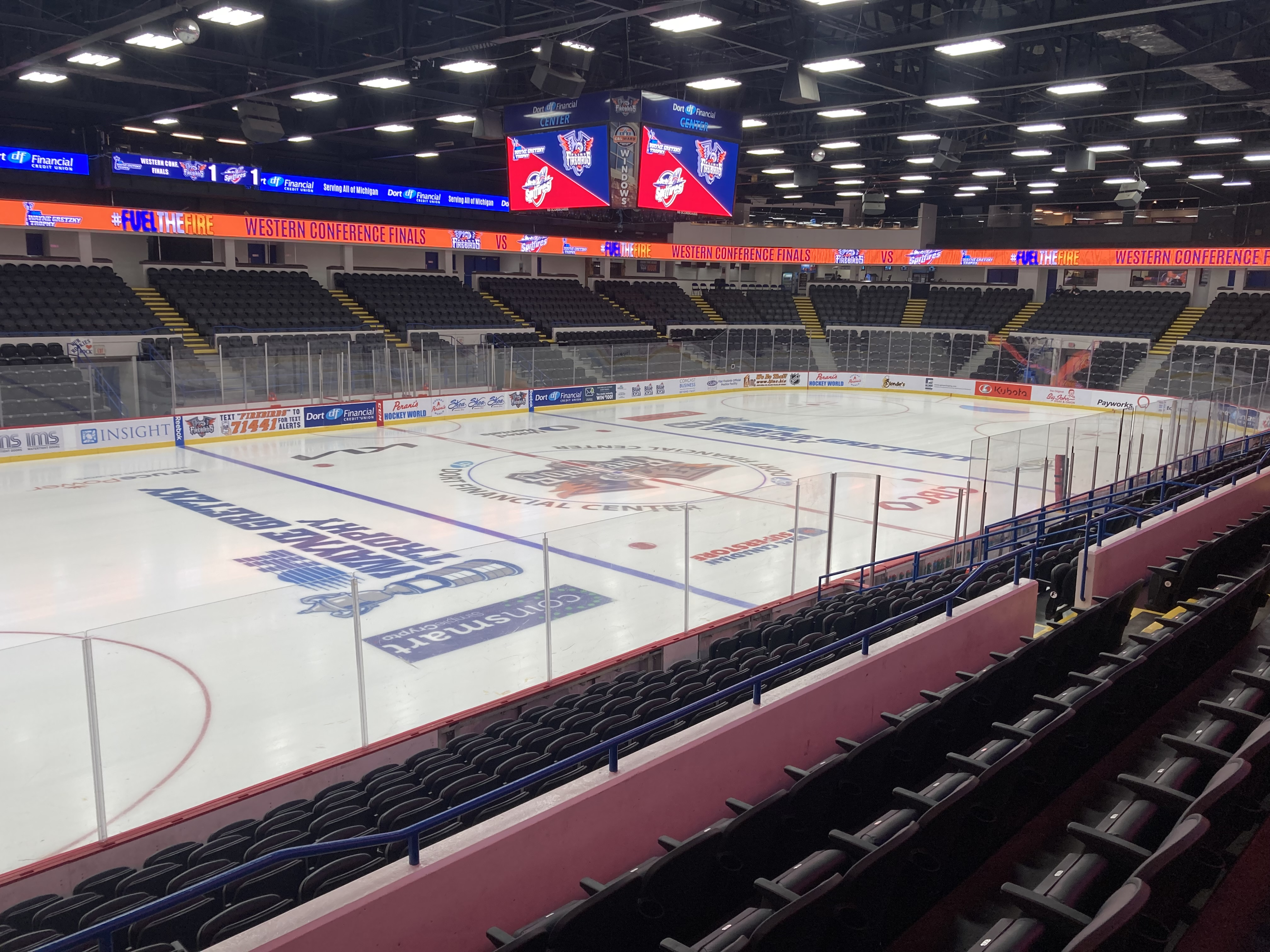
Dort Fincancial Center, 2022

== Tenants ==
=== Current ===
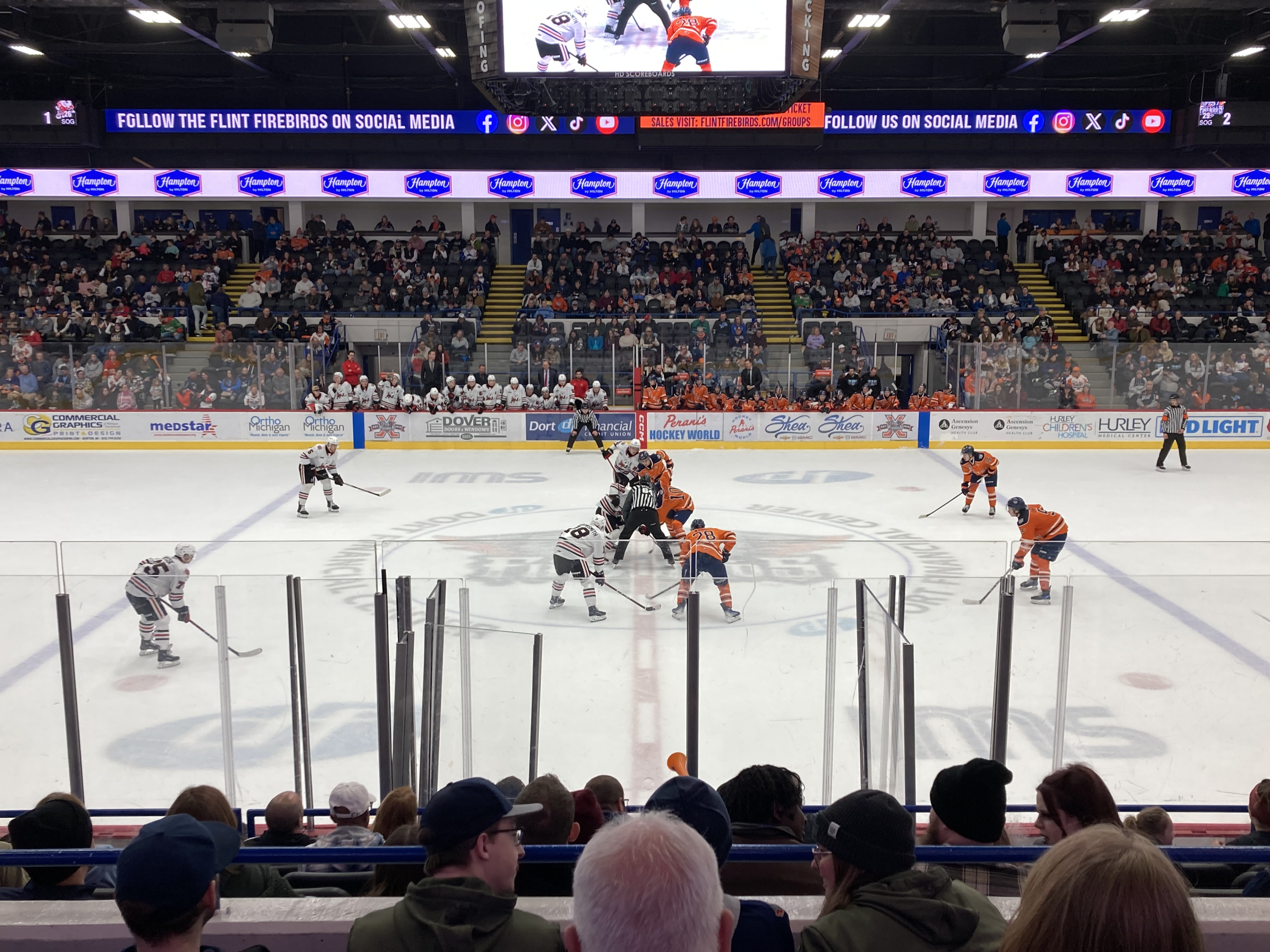
Niagara IceDogs vs. Flint Firebirds game at the Dort Financial Center

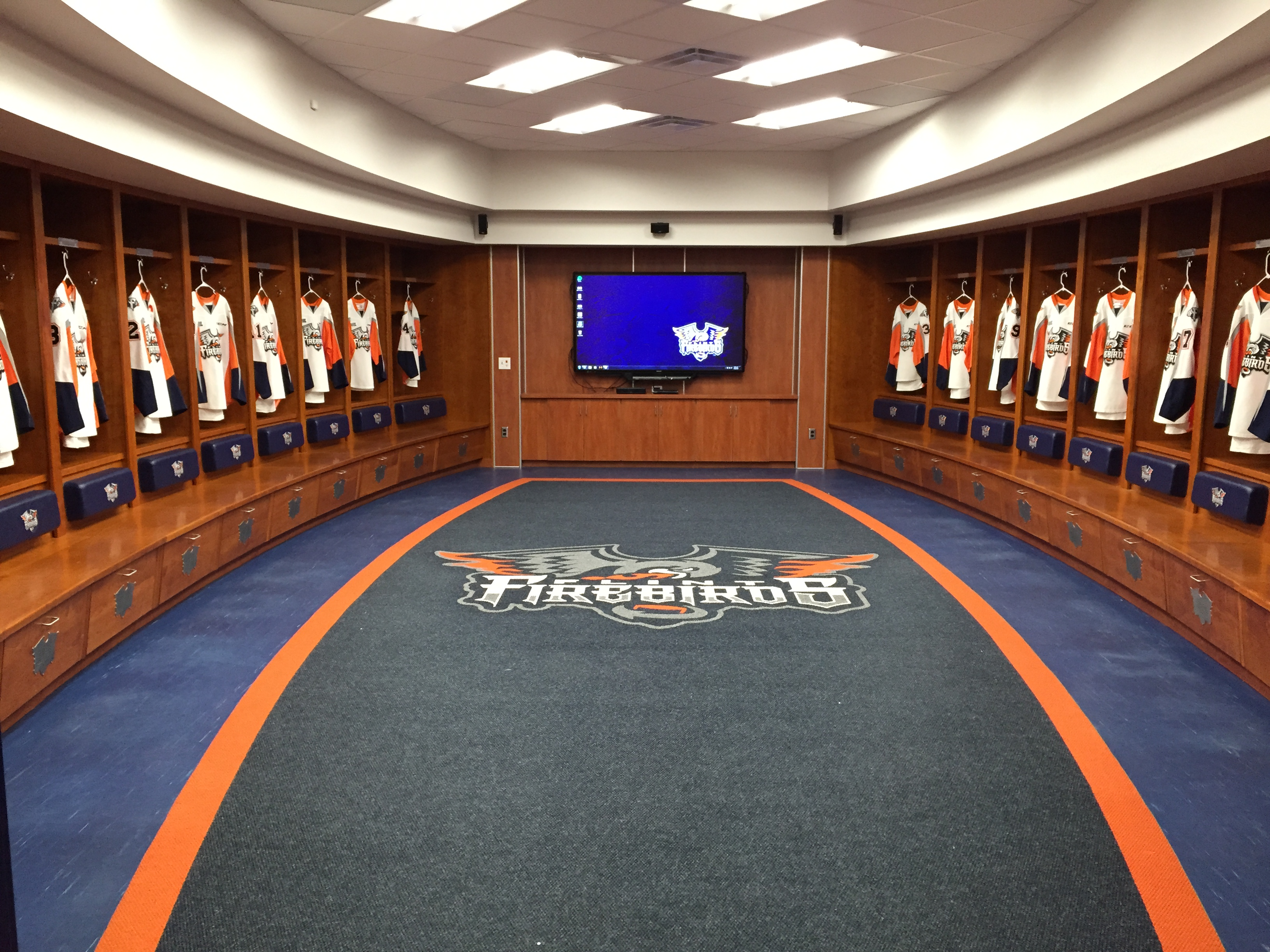
The Flint Firebirds Locker Room

On January 13, 2015, the Plymouth Whalers of the Ontario Hockey League announced they would relocate to Flint and play at Dort Federal Event Center, with OHL approval. That team is now known as the Flint Firebirds.

=== Former ===
Previous tenants of the arena include the Flint Generals IHL hockey team from 1969 to 1985, the Flint Spirits hockey team from 1985 to 1990, the Flint Bulldogs hockey team from 1991 to 1993, the Flint Fuze basketball team from 2001 to 2002 and the Flint Flames indoor football team which only lasted the 2000 season. The most recent iteration of the Flint Generals moved into the arena in 1993 and departed in 2010. From 2010 through 2015, the arena was the home of the Michigan Warriors of the North American Hockey League. From 2015 to 2016, the arena was also home to Waza Flo of the Major Arena Soccer League.

The Michigan Pirates of the Continental Indoor Football League (formerly based in Port Huron) played their first and second-round playoff games at the Perani Arena, hoping Flint would be a potential relocation site. After the Pirates folded, Perani Arena was home to the CIFL expansion team Flint Phantoms for the 2008 season.

== Events ==
Local high schools and colleges use the arena for their commencement ceremonies. Dort Financial Center is also usually the first stop for the Shrine Circus every year. The arena also holds the General RV Show every year.

The arena has also annually hosted Really Cool Comic Con since 2021.
