= Tom Ross (ice hockey defenseman) =

American ice hockey player

- Born: West Roxbury, Massachusetts, U.S.
- Height: 5 ft 11 in (180 cm)
- Weight: 174 lb (79 kg; 12 st 6 lb)
- Position: Defenseman
- Played for: Boston University
- NHL draft: Undrafted
- Playing career: 1963–1966
- Military career
- Allegiance: United States
- Branch: United States Marine Corps

Thomas Ross is an American retired ice hockey defenseman and marine who was a two-time All-American for Boston University.

== Early life ==
Ross was born in West Roxbury neighborhood of Boston.

=== College hockey ===
He was varsity defenseman for Boston University during the program's renaissance in the mid-1960s. A part of Jack Kelley's first recruiting class for BU, Ross helped the Terriers prevent nearly 30 additional goals against than the previous season. The team had a breakout year in 1965 and Ross led BU to its best season in 17 years, compiling a 25–6 record and winning their first conference title. Ross placed on both the All-American and First Team All-ECAC rosters and was named as the ECAC Most Outstanding Defenseman. The Terriers faltered in the conference semifinal and failed to advance to the NCAA tournament.

As a senior, Ross lead the Terriers to a second-place finish in their conference. In the ECAC Tournament, the team again lost in the semifinal, however, because Cornell had finished second and all Ivy League schools were in a years-long argument with the NCAA over player eligibility, Cornell declined their invitation and it went to the third-place team, Boston University. In the team's first appearance at the national tournament in six years, the Terriers finished both games with three-goal margins and finished in first place.

== Career ==
After graduating, Ross enlisted in the United States Marine Corps. After serving in the Vietnam War, he left the military but continued his public service by working as an officer in the Boston Police Department. He was inducted into the Boston University Athletic Hall of Fame in 1978.

== Career statistics ==
=== Regular season and playoffs ===
			Regular Season					Playoffs
Season	Team	League	GP	G	A	Pts	PIM	GP	G	A	Pts	PIM
1963–64	Boston University	ECAC Hockey	23	1	10	11	10	—	—	—	—	—
1964–65	Boston University	ECAC Hockey	31	0	17	17	6	—	—	—	—	—
1965–66	Boston University	ECAC Hockey	25	1	15	16	4	—	—	—	—	—
NCAA Totals			79	2	42	44	20	—	—	—	—	—

== Awards and honors ==
Award	Year
All-ECAC Hockey First Team	1964–65
AHCA East All-American	1964–65
ECAC Hockey All-Tournament First Team	1965
All-ECAC Hockey Second Team	1965–66
AHCA East All-American	1965–66
ECAC Hockey All-Tournament Second Team	1966

Awards and achievements
Preceded by Richie Green	ECAC Hockey Outstanding Defenseman; 1964–65	Succeeded by Robert Gaudreau
