= Doug Roberts (ice hockey) =

American ice hockey player

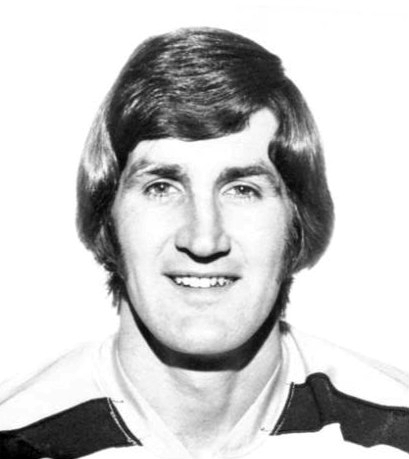
- Born: October 28, 1942 (age 83) Detroit, Michigan, U.S.
- Height: 6 ft 2 in (188 cm)
- Weight: 212 lb (96 kg; 15 st 2 lb)
- Position: Right wing
- Shot: Right
- Played for: California Golden Seals; Boston Bruins; Detroit Red Wings; New England Whalers
- Playing career: 1966–1977

Douglas William Roberts (born October 28, 1942) is an American former professional ice hockey player and coach who played 419 games in the National Hockey League and 140 games in the World Hockey Association between 1966 and 1977.

== Career ==
Roberts played for the California Golden Seals, Boston Bruins, Detroit Red Wings, and New England Whalers after starring for the Michigan State University hockey team. His NHL career was comparatively modest, but he did participate in the 1971 NHL All-Star Game as the weak Seals lone representative at a time when there were very few American players in the NHL.

After retiring from hockey, he served as the head coach of the Connecticut College men's ice hockey team in 1980–2000. He is the brother of Gordie Roberts and father of David Roberts, both former NHL players.

== Awards and honors ==
Award	Year
All-WCHA Second Team	1964–65
AHCA West All-American	1964–65

- Played in NHL All-Star Game (1971)

== Career statistics ==
			Regular season					Playoffs
Season	Team	League	GP	G	A	Pts	PIM	GP	G	A	Pts	PIM
1962–63	Michigan State University	WCHA	23	7	6	13	34	—	—	—	—	—
1963–64	Michigan State University	WCHA	22	21	14	35	16	—	—	—	—	—
1964–65	Michigan State University	WCHA	29	28	33	61	42	—	—	—	—	—
1965–66	Detroit Red Wings	NHL	1	0	0	0	0	—	—	—	—	—
1965–66	Memphis Wings	CPHL	70	20	40	60	71	—	—	—	—	—
1966–67	Detroit Red Wings	NHL	13	3	1	4	0	—	—	—	—	—
1966–67	Memphis Wings	CPHL	57	11	18	29	116	—	—	—	—	—
1967–68	Detroit Red Wings	NHL	37	8	9	17	12	—	—	—	—	—
1967–68	Fort Worth Wings	CPHL	28	8	17	25	73	13	5	8	13	16
1968–69	Oakland Seals	NHL	76	1	19	20	79	7	0	1	1	34
1969–70	Oakland Seals	NHL	76	6	25	31	107	4	0	2	2	6
1970–71	California Golden Seals	NHL	78	4	13	17	94	—	—	—	—	—
1971–72	Boston Bruins	NHL	3	1	0	1	0	—	—	—	—	—
1971–72	Boston Braves	AHL	74	35	40	75	107	9	1	4	5	21
1972–73	Boston Bruins	NHL	45	4	7	11	7	5	2	0	2	6
1972–73	Boston Braves	AHL	7	2	3	5	0	—	—	—	—	—
1973–74	Boston Bruins	NHL	7	0	1	1	2	—	—	—	—	—
1973–74	Detroit Red Wings	NHL	57	12	25	37	33	—	—	—	—	—
1974–75	Detroit Red Wings	NHL	26	4	4	8	8	—	—	—	—	—
1974–75	Virginia Wings	AHL	31	7	11	18	32	5	0	2	2	4
1975–76	New England Whalers	WHA	76	4	13	17	51	17	1	1	2	8
1976–77	New England Whalers	WHA	64	3	18	21	33	2	0	0	0	0
1976–77	Rhode Island Reds	AHL	8	2	4	6	4	—	—	—	—	—
1977–78	Jokerit	SM-l	31	4	2	6	38	—	—	—	—	—
NHL totals			419	43	104	147	342	16	2	3	5	46
CPHL totals			155	39	75	114	260	13	5	8	13	16
WHA totals			140	7	31	38	84	19	1	1	2	8
