= Grant Heffernan =

Canadian ice hockey player

- Born: Peterborough, Ontario, Canada
- Height: 6 ft 0 in (183 cm)
- Weight: 180 lb (82 kg; 12 st 12 lb)
- Position: Center
- Played for: Providence
- NHL draft: Undrafted
- Playing career: 1962–1968

Grant J. Heffernan is a Canadian retired ice hockey Center and coach who was an All-American for Providence.

== Career ==
Heffernan was a star junior ice hockey and lacrosse player and was the MVP for the Hastings Legionnaires when the team won the Minto Cup in 1961. While continuing to play senior lacrosse in the OLA, Heffernan received an ice hockey scholarship to Providence College. he was surprised by the offer but accepted nonetheless and began playing with the varsity team in 1962. In his first season the Friars finished with a good record and were seeded 5th in the ECAC Tournament but lost their quarterfinal match. The following season Heffernantook on a more prominent role with the team and led the team in scoring with 48 points. Providence won the program's first regular season title that year and were the #1 seed in the conference tournament. After narrowly escaping an ignominious finish in the quarterfinal, the Friars marched to the title game and won their first ECAC Championship as well. Heffernan scored the game-winning goal in the title match and was selected for the ECAC Hockey All-Tournament Second Team. In the program's first NCAA Tournament appearance, the team performed well and had opportunities to win both of their games, but Providence finished 4th. For his senior season, Heffernan was named team co-Captain and again led the Friars in scoring. He finished 3rd in the nation with 58 points and was named an All-American but the team didn't have nearly the same success as it did the year before. Providence squeaked into the ECAC tournament in 8th place and lost their first game to end Heffernan's college career with a loss.

After graduating, Heffernan returned to Canada and continued his education at McMaster University. He played for the ice hockey team in 1968 and retired from the game once he had used up his academic eligibility. Heffernan continued his lacrosse career until 1972, recording a total of 1,119 points in the OLA and NLA. After his playing career ended, Heffernan turned to coaching and spent time as both an ice hockey and lacrosse coach. In 1977 he led the Scarborough Saints to the Canadian Junior B Championship. The same year he was inducted into the Providence Athletic Hall of Fame. He is a member of both the Ontario and Canadian Lacrosse Hall of Fames and was inducted into the Peterborough Sports Hall of Fame in 2012.

== Career statistics ==
=== Regular season and playoffs ===
==== Ice Hockey ====
			Regular Season					Playoffs
Season	Team	League	GP	G	A	Pts	PIM	GP	G	A	Pts	PIM
1962–63	Providence	ECAC Hockey	23	9	18	27	—	—	—	—	—	—
1963–64	Providence	ECAC Hockey	26	18	30	48	—	—	—	—	—	—
1964–65	Providence	ECAC Hockey	26	28	30	58	—	—	—	—	—	—
1967–68	McMaster Marauders	CIAU	—	—	—	—	—	—	—	—	—	—
NCAA Totals			75	55	78	133	—	—	—	—	—	—

== Awards and honors ==
Award	Year
All-ECAC Hockey First Team	1963–64
ECAC Hockey All-Tournament Second Team	1964
All-ECAC Hockey First Team	1964–65
AHCA East All-American	1964–65
