= 1964 ECAC Hockey men's ice hockey tournament =

American ice hockey sports competitive event

1964 ECAC Men's ice hockey tournament
- Dates: March 6–14, 1964
- Teams: 8
- Finals site: Boston Arena; Boston, Massachusetts
- Champions: Providence (1st title)
- Winning coach: Tom Eccleston (1st title)
- MVP: Bob Perani (St. Lawrence)
- ECAC Men's Ice Hockey Tournaments

The 1964 ECAC Hockey Men's Ice Hockey Tournament was the 3rd tournament in league history. It was played between March 6 and March 14, 1964. Quarterfinal games were played at home team campus sites, while the 'final four' games were played at the Boston Arena in Boston, Massachusetts. By reaching the championship game Providence was invited to participate in the 1964 NCAA Men's Ice Hockey Tournament. St. Lawrence, however, was passed over with Rensselaer chosen instead as the second eastern representative.

== Format ==
The tournament featured three rounds of play, all of which were single-elimination. The top eight teams, based on conference rankings, qualified to participate in the tournament. In the quarterfinals the first seed and eighth seed, the second seed and seventh seed, the third seed and sixth seed and the fourth seed and fifth seed played against one another. In the semifinals, the winner of the first and eighth matchup played the winner of the fourth and fifth matchup while the other two remaining teams played with the winners advancing to the championship game and the losers advancing to the third place game.

== Conference standings ==
Note: GP = Games played; W = Wins; L = Losses; T = Ties; Pct. = Winning percentage; GF = Goals for; GA = Goals against

1963–64 ECAC Hockey standings
	Conference							Overall					
	GP	W	L	T	Pct.	GF	GA	GP	W	L	T	GF	GA
Providence†*	19	16	3	0	.842	88	56	26	19	7	0	110	80
Army	21	17	4	0	.810	118	44	28	20	8	0	154	69
Colgate	21	15	6	0	.714	99	48	27	19	8	0	109	59
Harvard	21	15	6	0	.714	95	61	24	17	7	0	108	70
Boston College	24	16	7	1	.688	126	74	28	18	9	1	144	90
Dartmouth	21	14	7	0	.667	106	72	21	14	7	0	106	72
Rensselaer	18	12	6	0	.667	91	50	26	18	8	0	121	69
Clarkson	16	10	5	1	.656	86	48	25	17	7	1	135	76
Northeastern	22	14	8	0	.636	114	81	24	14	10	0	116	92
Vermont	8	4	2	2	.625	45	31	10	5	3	2	54	38
Bowdoin	20	12	8	0	.600	87	66	22	14	8	0	87	66
Brown	22	12	8	2	.591	97	72	24	13	9	2	104	78
Norwich	17	9	7	1	.559	73	65	19	10	8	1	79	74
St. Lawrence	16	8	7	1	.531	61	41	25	13	10	2	91	66
New Hampshire	25	13	12	0	.520	89	112	25	13	12	0	89	112
Cornell	20	9	10	1	.475	55	65	23	12	10	1	64	67
Williams	17	8	9	0	.471	71	100	18	9	9	0	71	100
Merrimack	13	6	7	0	.462	54	56	15	8	7	0	54	56
Massachusetts	16	6	8	2	.438	55	60	17	6	9	2	55	60
Boston University	21	9	12	0	.429	69	63	24	9	13	0	78	74
Hamilton	17	5	12	0	.294	45	90	18	6	12	0	45	90
Connecticut	7	2	5	0	.286	24	54	11	3	8	0	42	74
Colby	20	5	14	1	.275	63	110	19	6	12	1	68	115
Princeton	22	6	16	0	.273	79	113	24	8	16	0	79	113
American International	15	4	11	0	.267	69	97	18	7	11	0	104	103
Middlebury	20	4	16	0	.200	57	125	23	4	19	0	60	136
Yale	20	4	16	0	.200	48	97	22	4	18	0	52	102
Amherst	16	2	14	0	.125	48	94	19	5	14	0	48	94
MIT	10	0	10	0	.000	16	74	16	0	16	0	18	86
Championship: Providence † indicates conference regular season champion * indicates conference tournament champion

== Bracket ==
Quarterfinals; March 6
1	Providence	3*
8	Colgate	2
4	Clarkson	6
5	Harvard	4
2	Army	2
7	St. Lawrence	3
3	Boston College	2
6	Rensselaer	3

Semifinals; March 13
1	Providence	6
4	Clarkson	5
6	Rensselaer	1
7	St. Lawrence	3

Championship; March 14
1	Providence	3
7	St. Lawrence	1
Third place
4	Clarkson	2
6	Rensselaer	7

Note: * denotes overtime period(s)

=== Quarterfinals ===
==== (1) Providence vs. (8) Colgate ====
March 6	Providence	3 – 2	OT	Colgate	Rhode Island Auditorium

==== (2) Army vs. (7) St. Lawrence ====
March 6	Army	2 – 3	St. Lawrence	Smith Rink

==== (3) Boston College vs. (6) Rensselaer ====
March 6	Boston College	2 – 3	Rensselaer	McHugh Forum

==== (4) Clarkson vs. (5) Harvard ====
March 6	Clarkson	6 – 4	Harvard	Clarkson Arena

=== Semifinals ===
==== (1) Providence vs. (4) Clarkson ====
March 13	Providence	6 – 5	Clarkson	Boston Arena

==== (6) Rensselaer vs. (7) St. Lawrence ====
March 13	Rensselaer	1 – 3	St. Lawrence	Boston Arena

=== Third Place ===
==== (4) Clarkson vs. (6) Rensselaer ====
March 14	Clarkson	2 – 7	Rensselaer	Boston Arena

=== Championship ===
==== (1) Providence vs. (7) St. Lawrence ====
March 14	Providence	3 – 1	St. Lawrence	Boston Arena

== Tournament awards ==
=== All-Tournament Team ===
==== First Team ====
- F Jerry Knightley (Rensselaer)
- F Bob Brinkworth (Rensselaer)
- F Ray Mooney (Providence)
- D Larry Kish (Providence)
- D Jim Salfi (St. Lawrence)
- G Bob Perani* (St. Lawrence)

* Most Outstanding Player(s)

==== Second Team ====
- F Corby Adams (Clarkson)
- F John Keough (Providence)
- F Grant Heffernan (Providence)
- D Bill Grisdale (Rensselaer)
- D Fred Kitchen (Rensselaer)
- G Bill Sack (Rensselaer)
