= Bob Brinkworth =

Canadian ice hockey player (born 1942)

- Born: May 10, 1942 (age 84) Toronto, Ontario, Canada
- Height: 5 ft 8 in (173 cm)
- Weight: 165 lb (75 kg; 11 st 11 lb)
- Position: Center
- Played for: Rensselaer; Omaha Knights; Providence Reds; Baltimore Clippers; Port Huron Flags
- NHL draft: Undrafted
- Playing career: 1961–1974

Robert J. "Bob" Brinkworth (born May 10, 1942) is a Canadian retired ice hockey Center and coach who was a two-time All-American and ECAC Player of the Year for Rensselaer.

== Career ==
Brinkworth was recruited to Rensselaer Polytechnic Institute by the legendary Ned Harkness and began playing with the varsity team in 1961. As a sophomore he led the team in scoring, recording more than three points per game, and finished second in the nation with 71 points. He made the inaugural First Team All-ECAC roster and was a major reason for the Engineers making the ECAC Tournament. The team lost their quarterfinal match and ended their season in a disappointing fashion. As a junior Brinkwork again led the team in scoring and was third in the nation with 75 points. This time he received increasing attention for his efforts and was named an All-American as well as the ECAC Player of the Year. Despite his performance, Rensselaer played rather poorly during the season and did not even make the conference tournament.

Harkness left prior to Brinkworth's senior season to take over at Cornell. The coach was replaced by Rube Bjorkman (who would leave after the 1964 season) and the team rebounded with a much better campaign. Brinkworth was named team co-captain with Jerry Knightley and got the team to post an 18–8 record and return to the conference tournament. Brinkworth helped the team with its first ECAC tournament game but could not overcome the stout defense of St. Lawrence in the semifinal. RPI won what they thought was Brinkworth's final college game over long-time rival Clarkson to finish third in the tournament and Brinkworth was named to the All-Tournament First Team. When the NCAA selection committee passed over St. Lawrence in favor of RPI for the NCAA Tournament, Brinkworth had one last chance to make an impact with the Engineers. While the team lest to Denver in the semifinal, they recovered for a 2–1 win over Providence in the consolation game and Brinkworth able to end on a high note. He finished the season as the second highest scorer in the nation for the second time, behind only Knightley with 70 points.

After graduating, Brinkworth turned to a professional career, joining the Omaha Knights in the second season of the CPHL. The following year Brinkworth jumped up to the AHL, playing with the Providence Reds and Baltimore Clippers over four seasons. He was never able to get a call-up to the NHL, however, and moved to the IHL in 1970. In his first season with the Port Huron Flags the team finished 6th out of 7 teams but made the postseason and went on a stunning run. The Flags won the championship with Brinkworth leading the way, scoring 10 goals and 18 points in 14 games. The next season the team finished second in their division and went on a second postseason run to capture their second consecutive Turner Cup. Brinkworth spent two more seasons with Port Huron before retiring as a player.

Brinkworh began his second career as a coach, working with amateur and professional teams for many seasons. In 2004 he became the head coach for Florida Gulf Coast and headed the school's club team for 15 seasons. He was the American Collegiate Hockey Association Division II coach of the year in 2009. He was inducted into the RPI Athletic Hall of Fame in 1968.

== Career statistics ==
=== Regular season and playoffs ===
			Regular Season					Playoffs
Season	Team	League	GP	G	A	Pts	PIM	GP	G	A	Pts	PIM
1961–62	Rensselaer	ECAC Hockey	22	41	30	71	10	—	—	—	—	—
1962–63	Rensselaer	ECAC Hockey	23	34	41	75	8	—	—	—	—	—
1963–64	Rensselaer	ECAC Hockey	26	35	35	70	2	—	—	—	—	—
1964–65	Omaha Knights	CPHL	67	15	15	30	10	6	2	0	2	8
1965–66	Providence Reds	AHL	57	11	12	23	6	—	—	—	—	—
1966–67	Baltimore Clippers	AHL	56	9	14	23	12	3	0	1	1	2
1967–68	Baltimore Clippers	AHL	23	6	8	14	6	—	—	—	—	—
1968–69	Baltimore Clippers	AHL	73	24	19	43	30	4	0	0	0	0
1970–71	Port Huron Flags	IHL	70	22	39	61	12	14	10	8	18	0
1971–72	Port Huron Wings	IHL	70	29	47	76	6	15	6	8	14	2
1972–73	Port Huron Wings	IHL	55	26	32	58	25	11	3	4	7	2
1973–74	Port Huron Wings	IHL	14	5	2	7	0	—	—	—	—	—
NCAA totals			71	110	106	216	20	—	—	—	—	—
AHL totals			209	50	53	103	54	7	0	1	1	2
IHL totals			209	82	120	202	43	40	19	20	39	4

== Awards and honors ==
Award	Year
All-ECAC Hockey First Team	1961–62
All-ECAC Hockey First Team	1962–63
AHCA East All-American	1962–63
All-ECAC Hockey First Team	1963–64
AHCA East All-American	1963–64
ECAC Hockey All-Tournament First Team	1964

Awards and achievements
Preceded by Award Created	ECAC Hockey Rookie of the Year; 1961–62	Succeeded by Richie Green
Preceded by Ron Ryan	ECAC Hockey Player of the Year; 1962–63, 1963–64	Succeeded by John Cunniff
