= ECAC Hockey Rookie of the Year =

US college ice hockey award

- Sport: Ice hockey
- Awarded for: The Rookie of the Year in ECAC Hockey

History
- First award: 1962
- Most recent: Ethan Wyttenbach

The ECAC Hockey Rookie of the Year is an annual award given out at the conclusion of the ECAC Hockey regular season to the best freshman player in the conference as voted by the coaches of each ECAC team.

The Rookie of the Year was first awarded in 1962 and every year thereafter.

The vote has been split for the award four times in its history.

== Award winners ==
Year	Winner	Position	School
1961–62	Bob Brinkworth	Center	Rensselaer
1962–63	Richie Green	Defenceman	Boston University
1963–64	John Cunniff	Left wing	Boston College
1964–65	Doug Ferguson	Center	Cornell
1965–66	Kent Parrot	Forward	Harvard
1966–67	Herb Wakabayashi	Forward	Boston University
1967–68	Mike Hyndman	Right wing	Boston University
1968–69	Joe Cavanagh	Center	Harvard
1969–70	Tom Mellor	Defenceman	Boston College
1970–71	Bob Brown	Defenceman	Boston University
1971–72	Don Cutts	Goaltender	Rensselaer
1972–73	Vic Stanfield	Defenceman	Boston University
1973–74	Ron Wilson	Defenceman	Providence
1974–75	Bob Miller	Forward	New Hampshire
1975–76	Paul Skidmore	Goaltender	Boston College
1976–77	Jack Hughes	Defenceman	Harvard
1977–78	Mark Fidler	Forward	Boston University
1978–79	Bill Whelton	Defenceman	Boston University
1979–80	Mark Fusco	Defenceman	Harvard
1980–81	Don Sylvestri	Goaltender	Clarkson
1981–82	Normand Lacombe	Right wing	New Hampshire
1982–83	George Servinis	Left wing	Rensselaer
1983–84	John Cullen	Center	Boston University

Year	Winner	Position	School
1984–85	Joe Nieuwendyk	Center	Cornell
1985–86	John Messuri	Right wing	Princeton
1986–87	John Fletcher	Goaltender	Clarkson
1987–88	Trent Andison	Forward	Cornell
1988–89	Andre Faust	Left wing	Princeton
1989–90	Kent Manderville	Center	Cornell
1990–91	Geoff Finch	Goaltender	Brown
1991–92	Christian Soucy	Goaltender	Vermont
1992–93	Burke Murphy	Right wing	St. Lawrence
1993–94	Éric Perrin	Center	Vermont
1994–95	Paul DiFrancesco	Forward	St. Lawrence
1995–96	Kyle Knopp	Left wing	Cornell
1996–97	J. R. Prestifilippo	Goaltender	Harvard
1997–98	Erik Cole	Left wing	Clarkson
1997–98	Willie Mitchell	Defenceman	Clarkson
1998–99	Brandon Dietrich	Center	St. Lawrence
1999–00	Derek Gustafson	Goaltender	St. Lawrence
2000–01	Rob McFeeters	Left wing	Clarkson
2001–02	Chris Higgins	Left wing	Yale
2002–03	Hugh Jessiman	Right wing	Dartmouth
2003–04	Brian Ihnacak	Center	Brown
2003–04	David McKee	Goaltender	Cornell
2004–05	Joe Fallon	Goaltender	Vermont

Year	Winner	Position	School
2005–06	Bryan Leitch	Left wing	Quinnipiac
2006–07	Sean Backman	Right wing	Yale
2006–07	Brandon Wong	Forward	Quinnipiac
2007–08	Riley Nash	Center	Cornell
2008–09	Jody O'Neill	Goaltender	Dartmouth
2009–10	Jerry D'Amigo	Left wing	Rensselaer
2010–11	Andrew Calof	Center	Princeton
2011–12	Brian Ferlin	Right wing	Cornell
2012–13	Jason Kasdorf	Goaltender	Rensselaer
2013–14	Sam Anas	Forward	Quinnipiac
2013–14	Gavin Bayreuther	Defenceman	St. Lawrence
2014–15	Kyle Hayton	Goaltender	St. Lawrence
2015–16	Joe Snively	Forward	Yale
2016–17	Adam Fox	Defenceman	Harvard
2017–18	Matthew Galajda	Goaltender	Cornell
2018–19	Casey Dornbach	Forward	Harvard
2019–20	Nick Abruzzese	Forward	Harvard
2020–21	Ethan Haider	Goaltender	Clarkson
2021–22	Alex Laferriere	Right wing	Harvard
2022–23	Sam Lipkin	Left wing	Quinnipiac
2023–24	C. J. Foley	Defenceman	Dartmouth
2024–25	Michael Neumeier	Defenceman	Colgate
2025–26	Ethan Wyttenbach	Forward	Quinnipiac

=== Winners by school ===
School	Winners
Cornell	9
Harvard	9
Boston University	8
Clarkson	6
St. Lawrence	6
Quinnipiac	5
Rensselaer	5
Boston College	3
Dartmouth	3
Princeton	3
Vermont	3
Yale	3
Brown	2
New Hampshire	2
Colgate	1
Providence	1

=== Winners by position ===
Position	Winners
Center	11
Right wing	8
Left wing	10
Forward	12
Defenceman	13
Goaltender	15

== See also ==
- ECAC Hockey Awards
