= Richie Green (ice hockey) =

American ice hockey player

- Born: Watertown, Massachusetts, U.S.
- Height: 5 ft 9 in (175 cm)
- Weight: 165 lb (75 kg; 11 st 11 lb)
- Position: Defenseman
- Played for: Boston University
- NHL draft: Undrafted
- Playing career: 1962–1964

Richard Green is an American retired ice hockey defenseman, scout, and coach who was an All-American for Boston University even after suffering a career-ending injury.

== Early life ==
Born in Watertown, Massachusetts, Green was a standout player for Watertown High School in baseball, football, and hockey.

== Career ==
Green was recruited to Boston University in 1961 and made his debut with the Boston University Terriers in 1962. He received the ECAC Rookie of the Year, was named Second Team All-ECAC, and was selected as team co-captain as a junior. In 1964, while at the on-campus Sargent Gym, Green suffered a neck injury and was forced to end his playing career. Despite missing the later portion of the season, Green was named as the ECAC Most Outstanding Defenseman, to the All-ECAC First Team, and an All-American.

Green graduated from Boston University in 1965 and became an assistant for the Terriers during the season that the team reached the 1967 NCAA University Division men's ice hockey tournament. In 1968, he became a head coach at Colby College, overseeing the tennis, football, and ice hockey programs. After coaching one year of senior league hockey with the New England Blades, Green became a professional scout. He first worked with the Hartford Whalers and then signed on with the New York Islanders in 1980. He was inducted into the Boston University Athletic Hall of Fame in 1981.

== Career statistics ==
=== Regular season and playoffs ===
			Regular Season					Playoffs
Season	Team	League	GP	G	A	Pts	PIM	GP	G	A	Pts	PIM
1962–63	Boston University	ECAC Hockey	23	3	13	16	—	—	—	—	—	—
1963–64	Boston University	ECAC Hockey	16	3	11	14	—	—	—	—	—	—
NCAA Totals			39	6	24	30	—	—	—	—	—	—

== Awards and honors ==
Award	Year
All-ECAC Hockey Second Team	1962–63
All-ECAC Hockey First Team	1963–64
AHCA East All-American	1963–64

Awards and achievements
Preceded by Bob Brinkworth	ECAC Hockey Rookie of the Year; 1962–63	Succeeded by John Cunniff
Preceded by David Johnston	ECAC Hockey Outstanding Defenseman; 1963–64	Succeeded by Tom Ross
