= ECAC Hockey Best Defensive Defenseman =

Annual ice hockey award

- Sport: Ice hockey
- Awarded for: The Best Defensive Defenseman in ECAC Hockey

History
- First award: 1962
- Most recent: Elliott Groenewold

The ECAC Hockey Best Defensive Defenseman is an annual award given out at the conclusion of the ECAC Hockey regular season to the best defensive forward in the conference as voted by the coaches of each ECAC team.

The 'Outstanding Defenseman' was first awarded in 1962 but discontinued following the 1967 season. After 25 years of retirement the award was rekindled as the 'Best Defensive Defenseman' in the same year that the Best Defensive Forward was inaugurated (1993). It has since been conferred each year.

Only three players, Mike Traggio, Rob O'Gara and Trey Taylor have won the award more than once. The award has been split twice in its history, 1996–97 and 2013–14 .

== Award winners ==
Year	Winner	School
1961–62	Arlie Parker	St. Lawrence
1962–63	David Johnston	Harvard
1963–64	Richie Green	Boston University
1964–65	Tom Ross	Boston University
1965–66	Robert Gaudreau	Brown
1966–67	Harry Orr	Cornell
1992–93	Martin d'Orsonnens	Clarkson
1993–94	Mike Traggio	Brown
1994–95	Mike Traggio	Brown
1995–96	Jeff Kungle	St. Lawrence
1996–97	Matt Pagnutti	Clarkson
1996–97	Andrew Will	Union
1997–98	Raymond Giroux	Yale
1998–99	Jeff Burgoyne	Cornell
1999–00	Justin Harney	St. Lawrence
2000–01	Kent Huskins	Clarkson
2001–02	Brian McMeekin	Cornell
2002–03	Douglas Murray	Cornell
2003–04	Scott Ford	Brown
2004–05	Jaime Sifers	Vermont
2005–06	Mike Madill	St. Lawrence

Year	Winner	School
2006–07	Drew Bagnall	St. Lawrence
2007–08	Mike Moore	Princeton
2008–09	Matt Generous	St. Lawrence
2009–10	Justin Krueger	Cornell
2010–11	Brock Matheson	Union
2011–12	Danny Biega	Harvard
2012–13	Zach Davies	Quinnipiac
2013–14	Shayne Gostisbehere	Union
2013–14	Dennis Robertson	Brown
2014–15	Rob O'Gara	Yale
2015–16	Rob O'Gara	Yale
2016–17	James de Haas	Clarkson
2017–18	Alec McCrea	Cornell
2018–19	Matt Nuttle	Cornell
2019–20	Alex Green	Cornell
2020–21	Pierson Brandon	Colgate
2021–22	Zach Metsa	Quinnipiac
2022–23	Henry Thrun	Harvard
2023–24	Trey Taylor	Clarkson
2024–24	Trey Taylor	Clarkson
2025–26	Elliott Groenewold	Quinnipiac

=== Winners by school ===
School	Winners
Cornell	8
Clarkson	6
St. Lawrence	6
Brown	5
Harvard	3
Quinnipiac	3
Union	3
Yale	3
Boston University	2
Colgate	1
Princeton	1
Vermont	1

== See also ==
- ECAC Hockey Awards
