= Robert Gaudreau =

American ice hockey player (1944–2025)

- Born: March 8, 1944 Providence, Rhode Island, U.S.
- Died: December 26, 2025 (aged 81)
- Height: 6 ft 3 in (191 cm)
- Weight: 185 lb (84 kg; 13 st 3 lb)
- Position: Defenseman
- Shot: Left
- National team: United States
- Playing career: 1954–1969

Robert René Gaudreau (March 8, 1944 – December 26, 2025) was an American ice hockey defenseman and Olympian.

== Biography ==
Gaudreau played with Team USA at the 1968 Winter Olympics held in Grenoble, France. He previously played for the Brown Bears at Brown University.

Gaudreau died on December 26, 2025 at the age of 81. He was the father of former NHL player, Rob Gaudreau.

== Awards and honors ==
Award	Year
All-ECAC Hockey Second Team	1963–64
All-ECAC Hockey First Team	1964–65
AHCA East All-American	1964–65
All-ECAC Hockey First Team	1965–66
AHCA East All-American	1965–66
Inducted into the RI Hockey Hall of Fame	2021

Awards and achievements
Preceded by Tom Ross	ECAC Hockey Outstanding Defenseman; 1965–66	Succeeded by Harry Orr
