= John Simus =

American ice hockey player

- Born: January 27, 1943 Minneapolis, Minnesota, USA
- Died: March 15, 2018 (aged 75) Frisco, Texas, USA
- Position: Forward
- Played for: Colorado College
- NHL draft: Undrafted
- Playing career: 1961–1964
- Military career
- Burial place: Fort Snelling National Cemetery
- Allegiance: United States
- Branch: United States Army Rangers
- Service years: 1966–1968
- Rank: Captain

John Otto Simus (January 27, 1943 – March 15, 2018) was an American ice hockey Forward and Vietnam veteran who was an All-American for Colorado College

== Career ==
Simus joined the varsity squad at Colorado College in 1961 and suffered through one of the worst seasons in the history of college hockey. Simus scored 14 points for the Tigers and the team lost all 23 games they played during the campaign. CC's offense wasn't great but it was the defense that caused the most trouble; the Tigers allowed an average of almost 8 goals per game. The next season the team saw a vast improvement in play and produced a winning season (12–11) for the first time in five years. Head coach Tony Frasca was named as the National coach of the year for the quick turnaround but he resigned at the end of the season. As a senior Simus was relied on heavily by new bench boss Bob Johnson. Simus responded by leading the team in scoring and was named to the All-WCHA First Team and was an All-American.

After graduating, Simus eventually joined the Army Rangers and served both in Vietnam and the Dominican Republic. After leaving the military, Simus worked for Electronic Data Systems for 30 years.

== Career statistics ==
=== Regular season and playoffs ===
			Regular Season					Playoffs
Season	Team	League	GP	G	A	Pts	PIM	GP	G	A	Pts	PIM
1958–59	Washburn High School	USHS	—	—	—	—	—	—	—	—	—	—
1959–60	Washburn High School	USHS	—	—	—	—	—	—	—	—	—	—
1961–62	Colorado College	WCHA	18	7	7	14	14	—	—	—	—	—
1962–63	Colorado College	WCHA	—	—	—	—	—	—	—	—	—	—
1963–64	Colorado College	WCHA	26	21	17	38	18	—	—	—	—	—

== Awards and honors ==
Award	Year
All-WCHA First Team	1963–64
AHCA West All-American	1963–64
