= Wayne Smith (ice hockey) =

Canadian ice hockey player

- Born: February 12, 1943 (age 83) Kamsack, Saskatchewan, Canada
- Position: Defenceman
- Played for: Chicago Black Hawks
- Playing career: 1966–1969

Wayne Smith (born February 12, 1943) is a Canadian businessman and retired professional ice hockey defenceman. He played two games in the National Hockey League with the Chicago Black Hawks during the 1966–67 season.

== Early life ==
Smith was born in Kamsack. He played junior hockey with the Saskatoon Jr. Quakers and collegiate hockey with the Denver Pioneers men's ice hockey team.

== Career ==
Smith played for the Chicago Black Hawks in the National Hockey League from 1966 to 1967. He played the following season with Portland Buckaroos of the Western Hockey League and retired at the end of the 1968–1969 season to pursue his business career. Smith was an executive with the May Department Stores Company, Martin Lawrence Galleries, and the Walt Disney Company.

== Personal life ==
Smith has lived in Palos Verdes Estates, California, since 1981. He earned a Bachelor of Science degree in business from the University of Denver in 1966 and an MBA from the Daniels College of Business in 1967. He is the nephew of Hockey Hall of Famer Clint Smith.

== Career statistics ==
=== Regular season and playoffs ===
			Regular season					Playoffs
Season	Team	League	GP	G	A	Pts	PIM	GP	G	A	Pts	PIM
1959–60	Saskatoon Quakers	SJHL	2	0	1	1	0	—	—	—	—	—
1960–61	Saskatoon Quakers	SJHL	60	12	19	31	79	—	—	—	—	—
1961–62	Saskatoon Quakers	SJHL	48	12	19	31	99	7	3	5	8	16
1962–63	University of Denver	WCHA	—	—	—	—	—	—	—	—	—	—
1963–64	University of Denver	WCHA	31	6	5	11	85	—	—	—	—	—
1964–65	University of Denver	WCHA	17	7	27	34	36	—	—	—	—	—
1965–66	University of Denver	WCHA	32	8	17	25	72	—	—	—	—	—
1966–67	Chicago Black Hawks	NHL	2	1	1	2	2	1	0	0	0	0
1966–67	St. Louis Braves	CHL	70	4	9	13	50	—	—	—	—	—
1967–68	Portland Buckaroos	WHL	68	2	14	16	52	12	0	0	0	0
1968–69	San Diego Gulls	WHL	1	0	0	0	0	—	—	—	—	—
NHL totals			2	1	1	2	2	1	0	0	0	0

== Awards and honours ==
Award	Year
All-WCHA Second Team	1963–64
All-NCAA All-Tournament First Team	1964, 1966
All-WCHA First Team	1964–65
AHCA West All-American	1964–65
All-WCHA First Team	1965–66
AHCA West All-American	1965–66
