= ECAC Holiday Hockey Festival =

- Sport: College ice hockey
- Founded: 1961
- Folded: 1977
- No. of teams: 4–6
- Venue: Madison Square Garden III Madison Square Garden IV
- Last champion: Boston University
- Most titles: Clarkson, Cornell (4)

The ECAC Holiday Hockey Festival was an annual NCAA men's Division I ice hockey tournament held annually at Madison Square Garden in New York City around the Christmas and New Year holiday. The tournament began in the year the ECAC was founded and continued for fifteen years before dissolving after the 1976–77 season.

The tournament was the first mid-season event sponsored by ECAC Hockey and initially only invited four members of the conference to participate. As the competition grew and became more prestigious it was expanded to 6 teams for the 1964 iteration and, two years later, invited the first non-conference member to participate (Minnesota). The championship returned to a 4-team tournament in 1967. For the first 12 years the tournament was held before Christmas but began to wane in interest and was not held in 1973. After a year hiatus it returned, this time being played after the New Year. The change to January didn't seem to help matters and the Festival was permanently discontinued three years later.

== Yearly results ==
Year	Champion	Runner-up	Third place	Fourth place
1977	Boston University	Colgate	St. Lawrence	Bowdoin
1976	Clarkson	Vermont	Cornell	Pennsylvania
1975	Cornell	St. Lawrence	Brown	Boston College
1972	St. Louis	Notre Dame	Clarkson	St. Lawrence
1971	Notre Dame	St. Lawrence	Boston College	Brown
1970	Harvard	Clarkson	Yale	Bowdoin
1969	Cornell	St. Lawrence	Boston College	Rensselaer
1968	Clarkson	Yale	Brown; Dartmouth	None
1967	Cornell	Brown	St. Lawrence	Clarkson

Year	Champion	Runner-up	Third place	Fourth place	Fifth place	Sixth place
1966	Boston University	Clarkson	Minnesota	St. Lawrence	Yale	Princeton
1965	Cornell	St. Lawrence	Colgate; Northeastern	None	Yale; Boston College	None
1964	Northeastern	Brown	Clarkson	Providence	Cornell	St. Lawrence

Year	Champion	Runner-up	Third place	Fourth place
1963	Clarkson	Boston College	Brown	Army
1962	Boston College	Clarkson	St. Lawrence	Cornell
1961	Clarkson	St. Lawrence	Boston College; Boston University	None

Note: * denotes overtime

== Team records ==
Team	# of times participated	Titles
Clarkson	10	4
Cornell	7	4
Boston University	3	2
Boston College	7	1
Northeastern	2	1
Notre Dame	2	1
Harvard	1	1
St. Louis	1	1
St. Lawrence	11	0
Brown	6	0
Yale	4	0
Bowdoin	2	0
Colgate	2	0
Army	1	0
Dartmouth	1	0
Minnesota	1	0
Princeton	1	0
Providence	1	0
Rensselaer	1	0
Vermont	1	0
