= Jerry Knightley =

Canadian ice hockey player

- Born: Agincourt, Ontario, Canada
- Height: 5 ft 9 in (175 cm)
- Weight: 154 lb (70 kg; 11 st 0 lb)
- Position: Wing
- Played for: Rensselaer; Western Mustangs
- NHL draft: Undrafted
- Playing career: 1962–1968

Gerald N. "Jerry" Knightley is a Canadian retired ice hockey Winger and coach who was a two-time All-American for Rensselaer.

== Career ==
Knightley was one of the final recruits for Ned Harkness with the Engineers, arriving in Troy in the fall of 1961. Knightley's first season with the varsity team was the last for the legendary bench boss and Knightley produced tremendous results alongside Bob Brinkworth. Unfortunately, the team's defense was rather porous, allowing more than 4 goals per game, and RPI was unable to make the conference tournament. After Harkness' departure, Rube Bjorkman was installed as the head coach and the team's defense improved tremendously. Knightley and Brinkworth, who served as co-captains for the season, formed a powerful scoring duo that finished 1st and 2nd in the nation with Knightly leading the way (75 points). Knightley was named First Team All-ECAC and an All-American and got the Engineers into the conference tournament. RPI finished in third place, and weren't expecting to receive a bid to the NCAA Tournament, however, the conference runner-up St. Lawrence possessed a worse record and were passed over in favor of the 17–7 Engineers. RPI fell to Denver in the semifinal but Knightley helped the team recover to win the consolation game and was named to the All-Tournament Second Team.

Bjorkman left after one season and former standout Garry Kearns took over, however, the team was beginning to suffer from two years of little to no recruiting. With Brinkworth gone due to graduation the team's offense was led almost exclusively by Knightley. He finished with just 49 points on the year but still had 11 more than the next Engineer. While ECAC Hockey had split into two divisions, RPI still declined in the standings and missed out on the postseason. Knightley was still highly regarded for leading his team through a difficult season and was named an All-American once more.

After graduating with a degree in management engineering, Knightley returned to Ontario and attended Western Ontario. While earning his MBA Knightley also played for the Mustangs. He was inducted into the RPI Athletic Hall of Fame in 1968.

== Career statistics ==
=== Regular season and playoffs ===
			Regular Season					Playoffs
Season	Team	League	GP	G	A	Pts	PIM	GP	G	A	Pts	PIM
1960–61	Unionville Jets	OHA-B	24	21	12	33	—	—	—	—	—	—
1962–63	Rensselaer	ECAC Hockey	23	30	33	63	32	—	—	—	—	—
1963–64	Rensselaer	ECAC Hockey	26	33	42	75	33	—	—	—	—	—
1964–65	Rensselaer	ECAC Hockey	22	27	22	49	34	—	—	—	—	—
1965–66	Western Mustangs	CIAU	—	—	—	—	—	—	—	—	—	—
NCAA Totals			71	90	97	187	99	—	—	—	—	—

== Awards and honors ==
Award	Year
All-ECAC Hockey Second Team	1962–63
All-ECAC Hockey First Team	1963–64
AHCA East All-American	1963–64
ECAC Hockey All-Tournament First Team	1964
NCAA All-Tournament Second Team	1964
All-ECAC Hockey First Team	1964–65
AHCA East All-American	1964–65

Awards and achievements
Preceded by Tom Roe	NCAA Ice Hockey Scoring Champion; 1963–64	Succeeded by John Cunniff
