= Craig Falkman =

American ice hockey player (born 1943)

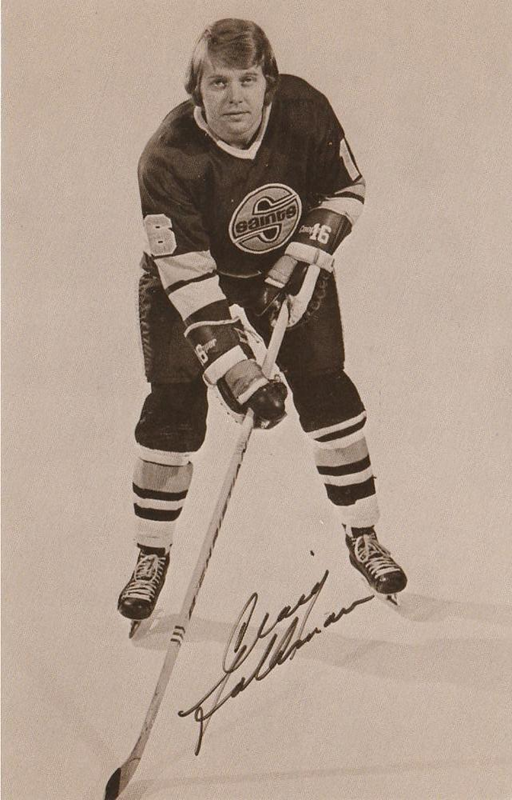
- Falkman in 1972 photo
- Born: August 1, 1943 (age 82) Saint Paul, Minnesota, United States
- Height: 5 ft 11 in (180 cm)
- Weight: 190 lb (86 kg; 13 st 8 lb)
- Position: Right Wing
- Shot: Right
- Played for: Minnesota Fighting Saints
- National team: United States
- Playing career: 1965–1973

Craig Dean Falkman (born August 1, 1943) is a retired professional ice hockey player who played 45 regular season games in the World Hockey Association for the Minnesota Fighting Saints in 1972-73. As an amateur, he played for the University of Minnesota men's hockey team as well as the United States national team at the 1968 Winter Olympics and also the 1967 and 1971 Ice Hockey World Championship tournaments. He now resides in Pueblo West, Co., and has retired from practicing psychology.

== Career statistics ==
			Regular season					Playoffs
Season	Team	League	GP	G	A	Pts	PIM	GP	G	A	Pts	PIM
1965–66	Rochester Mustangs	USHL	Statistics Unavailable
1966–67	Rochester Mustangs	USHL	28	12	9	21	15
1966–67	U.S. National Team	Intl	Statistics Unavailable
1967–68	U.S. Olympic Team	Intl	Statistics Unavailable
1970–71	U.S. National Team	Intl	44	16	14	30	38
1972–73	Minnesota Fighting Saints	WHA	45	1	5	6	12	—	—	—	—	—
WHA totals			45	1	5	6	12	—	—	—	—	—

== Awards and honors ==
Award	Year
All-WCHA Second Team	1963–64
AHCA West All-American	1963–64
