= Bob Perani =

American ice hockey player (1942–2012)

Robert (Bob) Perani
- Born: August 7, 1942 Rome, Italy
- Died: April 15, 2012 (aged 69) in flight/en route from Detroit to Tokyo
- Height: 5 ft 9 in (175 cm)
- Weight: 180 lb (82 kg; 12 st 12 lb)
- Position: Goaltender
- Caught: Left
- IHL team: Flint Generals
- Playing career: 1969–1974

Robert F. Perani (August 7, 1942 – April 15, 2012) was a professional ice hockey goaltender for the Flint Generals in the International Hockey League. He was also the founder of Perani's Hockey World sports retail chain in 1976, and owned the naming rights for the Perani Arena and Event Center. Perani died on April 15, 2012, while traveling on an international flight from Detroit to Tokyo.

Perani was born in Italy in 1942 and moved to Canada with his family in 1953, settling near Toronto. He attended St. Lawrence University where he was a member of Sigma Pi fraternity. He played for a number of leagues in Michigan and Ontario. He and his wife Kris moved to Flint in the late 1960s and never left. Kris died from cancer in 2006.The following year, as part of the 'Perani Group', he bought the Flint Generals. He retired as a player after the 1974 season and went into the pizza business and in 1976 started "Bob Perani's Sports Shop".

Perani retired to Thailand and died on a flight from Detroit to Tokyo en route to Thailand.

== Career ==
OHA

- Hamilton Tiger Cubs 1959-1960 - 1 game
- Toronto Marlboros 1960-1961 - 3 games
- Whitby Mohawks 1961-1962 - 30 games

ECAC Hockey - Division I (NCAA)

- St. Lawrence University Saints 1963-1966 - 63 games

IHL

- Muskegon Mohawks 1967-1968; 1968-1969 76 games
- Flint Generals 1969-1970; 1970-1974 142 games

AHL

- Springfield Kings 1967-1968, 1968-1969 7 games

OHA Sr

- Toronto Marlboros 1967-1968 - 0 games
- Barrie Flyers 1969-1970 10 games

== Awards and honors ==
Award	Year
All-ECAC Hockey First Team	1963–64
AHCA East All-American	1963–64
ECAC Hockey All-Tournament First Team	1964

- James Norris Memorial Trophy - 1968/1969 with teammate Tim Tabor with the Muskegon Mohawks

Awards and achievements
Preceded by Gene Kinasewich	ECAC Hockey Most Outstanding Player in Tournament; 1964	Succeeded by Pat Murphy
