= John Cunniff =

American ice hockey player and coach (1944–2002)

- Born: July 9, 1944 South Boston, Massachusetts, U.S.
- Died: May 10, 2002 (aged 57) Albany, New York, U.S.
- Height: 5 ft 9 in (175 cm)
- Weight: 175 lb (79 kg; 12 st 7 lb)
- Position: Left wing
- Shot: Left
- Played for: New England Whalers; Quebec Nordiques
- National team: United States
- Playing career: 1966–1980

John Paul Cunniff (July 9, 1944 – May 10, 2002) was an American ice hockey coach and former professional player who appeared in 65 World Hockey Association regular season games between 1972 and 1976. After his playing career he worked as a coach, including in the National Hockey League (NHL) with the Hartford Whalers in 1983 and the New Jersey Devils from 1989 to 1991. Cunniff was inducted into the United States Hockey Hall of Fame in 2003.

== Amateur career ==
Cunniff was born in South Boston, Massachusetts and attended Boston College, where he was a two-time All-American left wing, and was the 1964 Rookie of the Year, and was the first hockey player ever to be named the Beanpot MVP twice ('64 & '65); a record that lasted for 39 years. He was a dominant scorer, his 71 goals and 82 assists in just 75 games established a Boston College career point record. His 67 points in 1966–67 were the best in the nation, and helped the Eagles reach the NCAA Championship finals.

Twice he won All-America honors, was a three-time All-East selection, and a three-time All-New England choice. He was named to the All-Time Boston Garden Beanpot Tournament Team.

Cunniff wore #2 for the Eagles from 1963 to 1966 and registered 153 points—71 goals and 82 assists—in 75 collegiate games. He earned All-America honors in 1965 and 1966.

He joined the U.S. National team in 1967 for the Ice Hockey World Championship tournament in Vienna and also played for the U.S. at the 1968 Olympics in Grenoble.

== Professional career ==
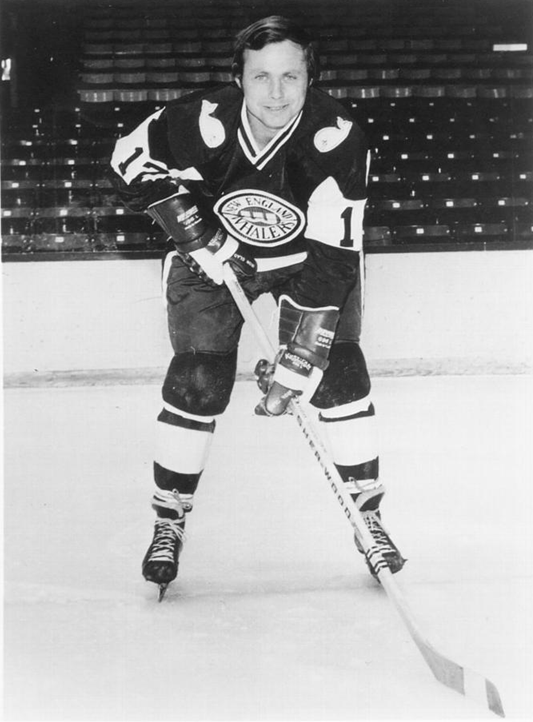
John Cunniff for New England Whalers in 1972 photo

John Cunniff enjoyed a successful professional playing career with the Detroit Red Wings, Boston Bruins, and Quebec Nordiques organizations, and as a member of the New England Whalers in the World Hockey Association in 1972–74. Cunniff played on the New England Whalers team that won the WHA's inaugural championship. He returned to the U.S. national team for the 1975 hockey world championship tournament.

== Coaching career ==
Cunniff served as a player/coach in the North American Hockey League and New England Hockey League before joining the Hartford Whalers as an assistant coach in 1981 after his playing career had ended in 1979. He was named head coach of the Binghamton Whalers the following season and coached the Hartford Whalers during the 1982–83 NHL season.

He then joined the Boston Bruins organization as assistant coach of the Bruins with Terry O'Reilly in the 1987–88 Stanley Cup appearance. He was head coach of the New Jersey Devils from 1989 to 1991, coached the Albany River Rats, and his name was engraved on the Stanley Cup with the Devils in 2000.

His involvement in 13 seasons with the Devils organization includes serving as head coach of the NHL club for two seasons (1989–90 and 1990–91). Prior to joining the Devils' organization, he was an assistant coach with the Boston Bruins for three seasons. In addition, he guided the Hartford Whalers for 13 games as head coach in 1982-83.

Cunniff's extensive experience with USA Hockey includes serving as an associate coach during the 1994 Winter Olympic Games in Lillehammer, Norway, as an assistant coach for the 1998 U.S. Olympic Men's Ice Hockey Team in Nagano, Japan, and as an assistant coach for the 2002 U.S. Olympic Men's Hockey Team in Salt Lake City, Utah. Cunniff was named assistant coach for the United States team that captured the championship in the 1996 World Cup of Hockey. He was an assistant coach for four U.S. National Teams (1982, 1991, 1992 and 1993) at the International Ice Hockey Federation (IIHF) Men's World Championships, and was an assistant on two U.S. National Junior Teams (1992 and 1993) at the IIHF World Junior Championships. In addition, Cunniff was an assistant coach for Team USA in the 1981 Canada Cup tournament.

Cunniff served as head coach of the Albany River Rats—the top minor-league affiliate of the National Hockey League's New Jersey Devils—for five seasons (1996–2001). He finished in 2000-01 as the AHL's longest-tenured head coach at the time. After posting a record of 187-169-39 as head coach with Albany, Cunniff transitioned to New Jersey's scouting staff in 2001.

Cunniff was inducted into the Massachusetts Hockey Hall of Fame in 1997; was named the 1998 Walter Yaciuk Award Winner for his outstanding contribution to USA Hockey's coaching education program and in 2002; was posthumously honored with the USA Hockey Distinguished Achievement Award.

He died from esophageal cancer in Albany, New York and is buried at Cedar Grove Cemetery in Dorchester, Massachusetts.

He was inducted into the Massachusetts Hockey Hall of Fame and the U.S. Hockey Hall of Fame.

He was inducted into the Boston College Varsity Club Athletic Hall of Fame in 1978, and his number was retired to the rafters of the Conte Forum at Boston College.

== Career statistics ==
=== Regular season and playoffs ===
			Regular season					Playoffs
Season	Team	League	GP	G	A	Pts	PIM	GP	G	A	Pts	PIM
1963–64	Boston College	ECAC	28	27	25	52	0	—	—	—	—	—
1964–65	Boston College	ECAC	27	29	34	63	0	—	—	—	—	—
1965–66	Boston College	ECAC	15	13	21	34	8	—	—	—	—	—
1966–67	U.S. Nationals	USHL	22	17	13	30	29	—	—	—	—	—
1966–67	U.S. National Team	Intl	Statistics Unavailable
1967–68	U.S. Olympic Team	Intl	Statistics Unavailable
1967–68	Fort Worth Wings	CPHL	8	2	1	3	9	—	—	—	—	—
1968–69	Fort Worth Wings	CHL	69	16	26	42	30	—	—	—	—	—
1969–70	Cleveland Barons	AHL	63	26	17	43	36	—	—	—	—	—
1970–71	Baltimore Clippers	AHL	67	31	25	56	33	6	0	0	0	0
1971–72	Rochester Americans	AHL	66	16	29	45	57	—	—	—	—	—
1972–73	New England Whalers	WHA	33	3	5	8	16	13	1	1	2	2
1973–74	Jacksonville Barons	AHL	52	18	20	38	18	—	—	—	—	—
1973–74	New England Whalers	WHA	30	7	5	12	14	5	1	1	2	0
1974–75	Cape Codders	NAHL	70	46	44	90	18	3	3	0	3	14
1975–76	Cape Codders	NAHL	50	24	35	59	25	—	—	—	—	—
1975–76	Maine Nordiques	NAHL	14	6	23	29	0	4	2	2	4	9
1975–76	Quebec Nordiques	WHA	2	0	0	0	5	—	—	—	—	—
1976–77	Maine Nordiques	NAHL	74	29	65	94	23	12	10	7	17	9
1978–79	New Hampshire/Cape Cod Freedoms	NEHL	67	40	78	118	17	—	—	—	—	—
1979–80	Springfield Indians	AHL	11	2	2	4	5	—	—	—	—	—
1979–80	Richmond Rifles	EHL	—	—	—	—	—	2	0	2	2	0
WHA totals			65	10	10	20	35	18	2	2	4	2

== Head coaching record ==
Team	Year	Regular season						Postseason			
Team	Year	G	W	L	T	Pts	Finish	W	L	Win %	Result
HFD	1982–83	13	3	9	1	7	5th in Adams	—	—	—	Missed playoffs
NJD	1989–90	66	31	28	7	69	2nd in Patrick	2	4	.333	Lost in First Round
NJD	1990–91	67	28	28	11	68	(fired)	—	—	—	—
Total		146	62	65	19			2	4	.333	1 playoff appearance

== See also ==
- List of members of the United States Hockey Hall of Fame

== Awards and honors ==
Award	Year
All-ECAC Hockey First Team	1963–64; 1964–65
AHCA East All-American	1964–65; 1965–66
ECAC Hockey All-Tournament First Team	1965
All-NCAA All-Tournament First Team	1965
All-ECAC Hockey Second Team	1965–66

Awards and achievements
Preceded by Richie Green	ECAC Hockey Rookie of the Year; 1963–64	Succeeded by Doug Ferguson
Preceded by Bob Brinkworth	ECAC Hockey Player of the Year; 1964–65	Succeeded by Terry Yurkiewicz
Preceded by Jerry Knightley	NCAA Ice Hockey Scoring Champion; 1964–65	Succeeded by Doug Ferguson
Sporting positions
Preceded by Jim Schoenfeld	Head coach of the New Jersey Devils; 1989–91	Succeeded by Tom McVie
Preceded by Larry Pleau	Head coach of the Hartford Whalers; 1982–83	Succeeded by Jack "Tex" Evans
