= 1965 ECAC Hockey men's ice hockey tournament =

1965 hockey tournament

1965 ECAC Men's ice hockey tournament
- Dates: March 9–13, 1965
- Teams: 8
- Finals site: Boston Arena; Boston, Massachusetts
- Champions: Boston College (1st title)
- Winning coach: John Kelley (1st title)
- MVP: Pat Murphy (Boston College)
- ECAC Men's Ice Hockey Tournaments

The 1965 ECAC Hockey Men's Ice Hockey Tournament was the 4th tournament in league history. It was played between March 9 and March 13, 1965. Quarterfinal games were played at home team campus sites, while the 'final four' games were played at the Boston Arena in Boston, Massachusetts. By reaching the championship game both, Boston College and Brown received invitations to participate in the 1965 NCAA University Division Men's Ice Hockey Tournament.

== Format ==
The tournament featured three rounds of play, all of which were single-elimination. The top eight teams, based on conference rankings, qualified to participate in the tournament. In the quarterfinals the first seed and eighth seed, the second seed and seventh seed, the third seed and sixth seed and the fourth seed and fifth seed played against one another. In the semifinals, the winner of the first and eighth matchup played the winner of the fourth and fifth matchup while the other two remaining teams played with the winners advancing to the championship game and the losers advancing to the third place game.

== Conference standings ==
Note: GP = Games played; W = Wins; L = Losses; T = Ties; Pct. = Winning percentage; GF = Goals for; GA = Goals against

1964–65 ECAC Hockey standings
	Conference							Overall					
	GP	W	L	T	Pct.	GF	GA	GP	W	L	T	GF	GA
Boston University†	18	15	3	0	.833	86	34	31	25	6	0	165	65
Boston College*	20	15	5	0	.750	113	73	31	24	7	0	183	117
Clarkson	15	11	4	0	.733	65	38	25	18	7	0	104	64
Brown	22	16	6	0	.727	109	69	30	21	9	0	148	101
Cornell	18	13	5	0	.722	87	55	26	19	7	0	150	75
Northeastern	19	11	8	0	.579	69	68	28	18	10	0	135	97
Dartmouth	16	8	8	0	.500	58	69	23	14	9	0	118	104
Providence	17	7	9	1	.441	53	68	26	14	11	1	110	100
Yale	20	8	12	0	.400	67	80	23	11	12	0	86	86
Rensselaer	15	5	8	2	.400	52	68	22	10	10	2	95	96
Harvard	20	7	13	0	.350	55	88	24	9	15	0	66	92
Army	10	3	7	0	.300	37	42	24	17	7	0	131	56
Colgate	14	4	10	0	.286	42	57	25	11	14	0	90	99
Princeton	21	4	17	0	.190	55	108	24	6	18	0	59	111
St. Lawrence	14	1	12	1	.107	34	67	22	5	16	1	63	96
Championship: Boston College † indicates conference regular season champion * indicates conference tournament champion

== Bracket ==
Quarterfinals; March 9–10
1	Boston University	5
8	Providence	3
4	Brown	4*
5	Cornell	3
2	Boston College	4
7	Dartmouth	1
3	Clarkson	6
6	Northeastern	3

Semifinals; March 12
1	Boston University	2
4	Brown	5
2	Boston College	3*
3	Clarkson	2

Championship; March 13
2	Boston College	6
4	Brown	2
Third place
1	Boston University	4
3	Clarkson	0

Note: * denotes overtime period(s)

=== Quarterfinals ===
==== (1) Boston University vs. (8) Providence ====
March 10	Boston University	5 – 3	Providence	Boston Arena

==== (2) Boston College vs. (7) Dartmouth ====
March 9	Boston College	4 – 1	Dartmouth	McHugh Forum

==== (3) Clarkson vs. (6) Northeastern ====
March 9	Clarkson	6 – 3	Northeastern	Clarkson Arena

==== (4) Brown vs. (5) Cornell ====
March 9	Brown	4 – 3	OT	Cornell	Meehan Auditorium

=== Semifinals ===
==== (1) Boston University vs. (4) Brown ====
March 12	Boston University	2 – 5	Brown	Boston Arena

==== (2) Boston College vs. (3) Clarkson ====
March 12	Boston College	3 – 2	OT	Clarkson	Boston Arena

=== Third Place ===
==== (1) Boston University vs. (3) Clarkson ====
March 13	Boston University	4 – 0	Clarkson	Boston Arena

=== Championship ===
==== (2) Boston College vs. (4) Brown ====
March 13	Boston College	6 – 2	Brown	Boston Arena

== Tournament awards ==
=== All-Tournament Team ===
==== First Team ====
- F Phil Dyer (Boston College)
- F Fred Bassi (Boston University)
- F John Cunniff (Boston College)
- D Ralph Toran (Boston College)
- D Tom Ross (Boston University)
- G Terry Yurkiewicz (Clarkson)

* Most Outstanding Player(s)

==== Second Team ====
- F Terry Chapman (Brown)
- F Bruce Fennie (Boston University)
- F Pete Flaherty (Boston College)
- D Don Eccelston (Brown)
- D Gary Patterson (Clarkson)
- G Pat Murphy* (Boston College)
