= Perani's Hockey World =

Perani's Hockey World was a retail chain founded by Bob Perani in 1976. They specialized in ice hockey. Indoor, outdoor and street hockey, and also lacrosse. With a main office in Flint, Michigan, Perani's had 19 stores in North America, with 9 locations in Michigan, 5 in Ohio, 3 in Tennessee and one each in Pennsylvania, Indiana.

Perani’s was acquired by Pure Hockey in April 2026, with all franchises rebranding into Pure Hockey locations by the end of the month
