= Jim Salfi =

Canadian ice hockey coach, player, manager and team owner (born 1942)

Biographical details
- Born: April 1, 1942 (age 84); Niagara Falls, Ontario, Canada
- Education: St. Lawrence University

Playing career
- 1961–1964: St. Lawrence
- Position: Defenceman

Coaching career (HC unless noted)
- 1964–1972: Pennsylvania
- 1972–1979: Rensselaer
- 1999–2012: Capital District Selects (HC/GM/Owner)

Head coaching record
- Overall: 183–192–7 (.488) [College]

Jim Salfi (born April 1, 1942) is a Canadian former ice hockey coach, player, general manager and team owner. He was the head coach of both the Pennsylvania and Rensselaer ice hockey programs early in his career.

== Career ==
Salfi entered the college ranks with St. Lawrence University in 1960. He joined the varsity ice hockey team as a sophomore (a standard practice at the time) and helped the Saints win the first ECAC Hockey conference tournament in 1962. Their season ended on a sour note, however, as St. Lawrence dropped both NCAA tournament games by a combined score of 11–2. The following season Salfi's team posted an even better record but lost in the ECAC semifinal and were left out of the national tournament. For his senior season Salfi served as team co-Captain with Alfred Bloomer but the team slid back in the standings, finishing 14th in the conference but were ranked 7th due to their strength of schedule. The Saints upset #2 Army in the first round before dropping Tri-State League rival Rensselaer in the semifinal. Though Salfi's team fell in the final to Providence their appearance in the final should have made them the at-large selection for the #2 eastern seed, however, their record was 13–10–2 and the NCAA selection committee decided on 17–7 Rensselaer instead.

After graduating that spring Salfi received a surprising offer to coach the Penn Quakers despite his sparse résumé. While taking graduate classes Salfi led the program as it was promoted to varsity status in his second year and the team responded by posting a 16–8 record. When the Quakers started playing against some of the better teams in his third season the wins were predictably harder to come by but their first victory against Dartmouth proved that Pennsylvania could compete. Salfi slowly built the program both on and off the ice, recruiting talented players who could challenge the championship squads iced by conference rivals Cornell and Boston University while also laying the groundwork for a new on-campus ice rink. Salfi met Penn alumnus, and class of 1923 president, Howard Butcher III at a party and convinced the stock broker to build a new arena for the program.

By 1971 Salfi was able to pull the Quakers out of the ECAC cellar, getting the team to make its first appearance in a conference tournament. The following season was even better with Pennsylvania finishing 4th in the conference and earning a home playoff game that they lost. With the program on the upswing it came as a shock to some when Salfi left the university in 1972 to take the coaching position at Rensselaer but Salfi had noticed a significant lack of interest with his team by the school's administration. With RPI Salfi took over a program that had recently climbed out of a 4-year slump but had yet to reclaim its former glory. The Engineers finished in 8th place each of Salfi's two first seasons and came out with a shocking upset of #1 New Hampshire in 1974, its first postseason win in a decade. After two middling seasons Rensselaer returned to the conference tournament in 1977 but could not get out of the first round. Even after managing to get a home game the following year the Engineers were still unable to escape the quarterfinals. In 1978–79 RPI had a disastrous season, finishing 13th in the conference and Salfi was out as coach soon thereafter.

Salfi remained outside hockey for much of the next twenty years but in 1999 he founded the Capital District Selects, a junior team in upstate New York and ran the team as owner and general manager for over a dozen years. In that time he also served as head coach on three separate occasions. Towards the end of his tenure with the team the program could barely win a game, finishing their final season in Troy, New York, 1–39–5. Afterwards Salfi sold his interest in the team and retired as an executive.

== Head coaching record ==
=== College ===
Record table
Season	Team	Overall	Conference	Standing	Postseason
Pennsylvania Quakers Independent (1965–1967)
1965–66	Pennsylvania	16–8–0			
1966–67	Pennsylvania	13–11–0			
Pennsylvania:		29–19–0			
Pennsylvania Quakers (ECAC Hockey) (1967–1972)
1967–68	Pennsylvania	6–18–0	1–15–0	17th	
1968–69	Pennsylvania	7–15–0	1–14–0	17th	
1969–70	Pennsylvania	8–16–0	3–12–0	16th	
1970–71	Pennsylvania	14–11–0	11–8–0	7th	ECAC Quarterfinals
1971–72	Pennsylvania	16–9–0	14–7–0	t–4th	ECAC Quarterfinals
Pennsylvania:		51–69–0	30–56–0		
Rensselaer Engineers (ECAC Hockey) (1972–1979)
1972–73	Rensselaer	16–15–0	11–9–0	t–7th*	ECAC Quarterfinals
1973–74	Rensselaer	14–15–1	8–9–0	8th	ECAC third-place game (loss)
1974–75	Rensselaer	14–13–1	8–10–1	10th	
1975–76	Rensselaer	13–13–2	9–12–2	10th	
1976–77	Rensselaer	17–12–1	14–10–0	6th	ECAC Quarterfinals
1977–78	Rensselaer	19–9–1	13–8–0	4th	ECAC Quarterfinals
1978–79	Rensselaer	10–17–1	8–16–1	13th	
Rensselaer:		103–94–7	71–74–4		
Total:		183–192–7			
National champion Postseason invitational champion Conference regular season champion Conference regular season and conference tournament champion Division regular season champion Division regular season and conference tournament champion Conference tournament champion

== Awards and honors ==
Award	Year
All-ECAC Hockey First Team	1963–64
