= Clem Trihey =

Canadian ice hockey player

- Born: June 24, 1897 Montreal, Quebec, Canada
- Died: February 4, 1973 (aged 75) Montreal, Quebec, Canada
- Height: 5 ft 7 in (170 cm)
- Weight: 150 lb (68 kg; 10 st 10 lb)
- Position: Right wing
- Played for: Victoria Cougars
- Playing career: 1916–1927

Israel Clement Trihey (June 24, 1897 – February 4, 1973) was a Canadian professional ice hockey player. He played with the Victoria Cougars of the Pacific Coast Hockey Association during the 1923–24 season.

He was a nephew of Hockey Hall of Fame inductee Harry Trihey.
