= 1964–65 NCAA University Division men's ice hockey season =

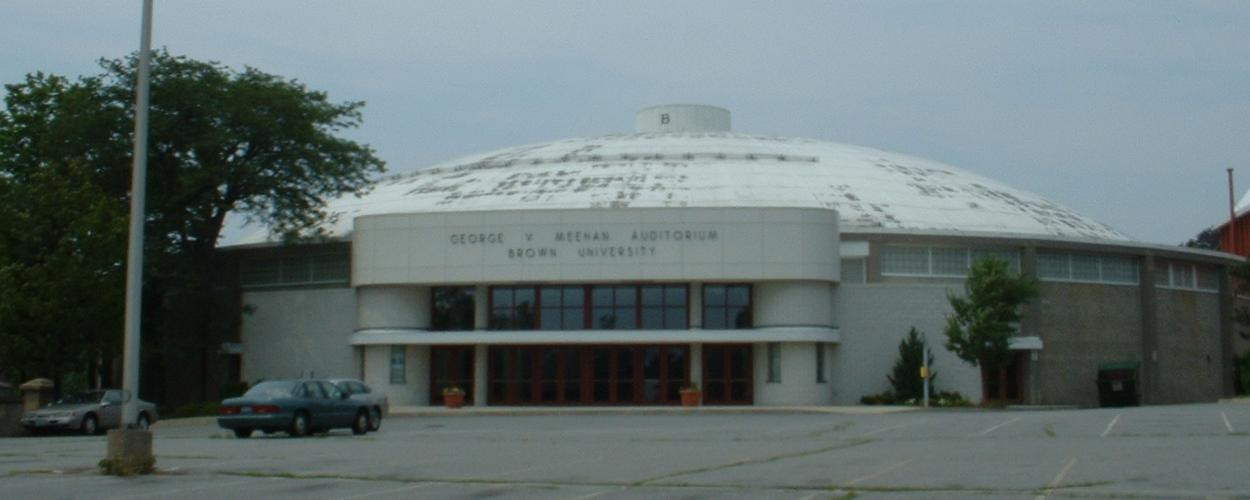
- The Meehan Auditorium served as the host for the 1965 Tournament
- Duration: November 1964– March 20, 1965
- NCAA tournament: 1965
- National championship: Meehan Auditorium; Providence, Rhode Island
- NCAA champion: Michigan Tech

The 1964–65 NCAA University Division men's ice hockey season began in November 1964 and concluded with the 1965 NCAA University Division Men's Ice Hockey Tournament's championship game on March 20, 1965 at the Meehan Auditorium in Providence, Rhode Island. This was the 18th season in which an NCAA ice hockey championship was held and is the 71st year overall where an NCAA school fielded a team.

The ECAC conference was nearly halved before the season, going from 29 teams the previous year down to 15. This happened due to the creation of a lower-tier division for the schools that couldn't afford or weren't willing to compete with the wealthier universities. The lower tier would go through several changes over the years but continues to operate as the Division III level as well as the lone remaining Division II conference, Northeast-10. (as of 2016)

== Regular season ==
=== Season tournaments ===
Tournament	Dates	Teams	Champion
Boston Garden Christmas Hockey Festival	December 18–20	8	Boston University
ECAC Holiday Hockey Festival	December 21–23	6	Northeastern
Boston Arena Christmas Tournament	December 28–30	4	Michigan
Rensselaer Holiday Tournament	December 28–30	4	Minnesota–Duluth
Yankee Conference Tournament	December 29–30	4	New Hampshire
Brown Holiday Tournament	January 1–2	4	Brown
Nichols School Invitational	January 1–2	4	Yale
Beanpot	February 8, 15	4	Boston College

=== Standings ===
1964–65 Big Ten standings
	Conference							Overall					
	GP	W	L	T	PTS	GF	GA	GP	W	L	T	GF	GA
Minnesota†	8	5	3	0	10	45	35	28	14	12	2	137	121
Michigan State	8	4	4	0	8	37	38	29	17	12	0	165	118
Michigan	8	3	5	0	6	36	45	26	13	12	1	110	122
† indicates conference regular season champion

1964–65 ECAC Hockey standings
	Conference							Overall					
	GP	W	L	T	Pct.	GF	GA	GP	W	L	T	GF	GA
Boston University†	18	15	3	0	.833	86	34	31	25	6	0	165	65
Boston College*	20	15	5	0	.750	113	73	31	24	7	0	183	117
Clarkson	15	11	4	0	.733	65	38	25	18	7	0	104	64
Brown	22	16	6	0	.727	109	69	30	21	9	0	148	101
Cornell	18	13	5	0	.722	87	55	26	19	7	0	150	75
Northeastern	19	11	8	0	.579	69	68	28	18	10	0	135	97
Dartmouth	16	8	8	0	.500	58	69	23	14	9	0	118	104
Providence	17	7	9	1	.441	53	68	26	14	11	1	110	100
Yale	20	8	12	0	.400	67	80	23	11	12	0	86	86
Rensselaer	15	5	8	2	.400	52	68	22	10	10	2	95	96
Harvard	20	7	13	0	.350	55	88	24	9	15	0	66	92
Army	10	3	7	0	.300	37	42	24	17	7	0	131	56
Colgate	14	4	10	0	.286	42	57	25	11	14	0	90	99
Princeton	21	4	17	0	.190	55	108	24	6	18	0	59	111
St. Lawrence	14	1	12	1	.107	34	67	22	5	16	1	63	96
Championship: Boston College † indicates conference regular season champion * indicates conference tournament champion

1964–65 Independent College Athletic Conference standings
	Conference							Overall					
	GP	W	L	T	PTS	GF	GA	GP	W	L	T	GF	GA
Clarkson†	4	4	0	0	8	20	7	25	18	7	0	104	64
Rensselaer	4	1	2	1	3	16	22	22	10	10	2	95	96
St. Lawrence	4	0	3	1	1	12	19	22	5	16	1	63	96
† indicates conference regular season champion

1964–65 NCAA University Division Independent ice hockey standings
	Conference							Overall					
	GP	W	L	T	PTS	GF	GA	GP	W	L	T	GF	GA
Alaska–Fairbanks	0	0	0	0	-	-	-	9	5	4	0	-	-
Minnesota–Duluth	0	0	0	0	-	-	-	27	14	12	1	146	107
Ohio State	0	0	0	0	-	-	-	10	4	6	0	49	58
Wisconsin	0	0	0	0	-	-	-	23	14	9	0	135	108

1964–65 Western Collegiate Hockey Association standings
	Conference							Overall					
	GP	W	L	T	PCT	GF	GA	GP	W	L	T	GF	GA
North Dakota†	16	13	3	0	.813	75	48	33	25	8	0	184	106
Michigan Tech*	18	12	5	1	.694	78	47	31	24	5	2	153	82
Minnesota	18	10	8	0	.556	86	78	28	14	12	2	137	121
Michigan State	14	7	7	0	.500	69	61	29	17	12	0	165	118
Michigan	18	7	11	0	.389	68	94	26	13	12	1	110	122
Denver	12	4	7	1	.375	34	37	28	18	8	2	144	74
Colorado College	16	2	14	0	.125	51	96	25	7	17	1	96	132
Championship: Michigan Tech † indicates conference regular season champion * indicates conference tournament champion

== 1965 NCAA Tournament ==
Semifinals; March 18–19
E1	Boston College	4
W2	North Dakota	3
W1	Michigan Tech	4
E2	Brown	0

National championship March 20
E1	Boston College	2
W1	Michigan Tech	8
Third-place game
W2	North Dakota	9
E2	Brown	5

Note: * denotes overtime period(s)

== Player stats ==
=== Scoring leaders ===
The following players led the league in points at the conclusion of the season.

GP = Games played; G = Goals; A = Assists; Pts = Points; PIM = Penalty minutes

Player	Class	Team	GP	G	A	Pts	PIM
John Cunniff	Junior	Boston College	27	31	36	67	–
Doug Roberts	Senior	Michigan State	29	28	33	61	42
Grant Heffernan	Senior	Providence	–	28	30	58	–
Keith Christiansen	Sophomore	Minnesota–Duluth	27	23	35	58	69
Doug Ferguson	Sophomore	Cornell	26	27	28	55	86
Gerry Kell	Junior	North Dakota	33	24	31	55	42
Phil Dyer	Junior	Boston College	–	12	43	55	–
Dennis Hextall	Sophomore	North Dakota	33	17	36	53	33
Murray Stephen	Junior	Cornell	26	27	25	52	57
Raymond Clegg	Sophomore	Wisconsin	22	27	22	49	–
Jerry Knightley	Senior	Rensselaer	22	27	22	49	34
Terry Chapman	Senior	Brown	30	24	25	49	–
Bruce Darling	Junior	Brown	30	–	–	49	–

=== Leading goaltenders ===
The following goaltenders led the league in goals against average at the end of the regular season while playing at least 33% of their team's total minutes.

GP = Games played; Min = Minutes played; W = Wins; L = Losses; OT = Overtime/shootout losses; GA = Goals against; SO = Shutouts; SV% = Save percentage; GAA = Goals against average

Player	Class	Team	GP	Min	W	L	OT	GA	SO	SV%	GAA
Jack Ferreira	Junior	Boston University	31	1783	25	6	0	63	8	.901	2.12
Tony Esposito	Sophomore	Michigan Tech	17	1021	-	-	-	40	1	.912	2.35
Dick Newell	Sophomore	Army	18	1028	12	6	0	43	3	.906	2.51
Alex Terpay	Junior	Michigan State	11	640	-	-	-	24	0	.857	2.54
Buddy Blom	Junior	Denver	28	-	18	8	2	-	0	.906	2.64
Terry Yurkiewicz	Junior	Clarkson	24	1366	18	6	0	56	1	.914	2.66
Errol McKibbon	Junior	Cornell	15	-	-	-	-	-	-	.891	2.75
Rick Best	Sophomore	Michigan Tech	14	840	-	-	-	42	1	.893	3.00
Dale Stauss	Sophomore	North Dakota	-	-	-	-	-	-	0	.821	3.00
Joe Lech	Senior	North Dakota	31	1080	-	-	-	56	2	.893	3.07

== Awards ==
=== NCAA ===
Award		Recipient
Spencer Penrose Award		James Fullerton, Brown
Most Outstanding Player in NCAA Tournament		Gary Milroy, Michigan Tech
AHCA All-American Teams
East Team	Position	West Team
Terry Yurkiewicz, Clarkson	G	Tony Esposito, Michigan Tech
Jack Ferreira, Boston University	G	
Robert Gaudreau, Brown	D	Don Ross, North Dakota
Tom Ross, Boston University	D	Wayne Smith, Denver
John Cunniff, Boston College	F	Doug Roberts, Michigan State
Grant Heffernan, Providence	F	Mel Wakabayashi, Michigan
Jerry Knightley, Rensselaer	F	Doug Woog, Minnesota

=== ECAC ===
Award		Recipient
Player of the Year		John Cunniff, Boston College
Rookie of the Year		Doug Ferguson, Cornell
Outstanding Defenseman		Tom Ross, Boston University
Most Outstanding Player in Tournament		Pat Murphy, Boston College
All-ECAC Hockey Teams
First Team	Position	Second Team
Jack Ferreira, Boston University	G	Terry Yurkiewicz, Clarkson
Tom Ross, Boston University	D	Don Turcotte, Northeastern
Robert Gaudreau, Brown	D	Ralph Toran, Boston College
John Cunniff, Boston College	F	Doug Ferguson, Cornell
Grant Heffernan, Providence	F	Dean Matthews, Dartmouth
Jerry Knightley, Rensselaer	F	Terry Chapman, Brown

=== WCHA ===
Award		Recipient
Most Valuable Player		Gerry Kell, North Dakota
Sophomore of the Year		Gary Milroy, Michigan Tech
Coach of the Year		Bob Peters, North Dakota
All-WCHA Teams
First Team	Position	Second Team
Tony Esposito, Michigan Tech	G	Joe Lech, North Dakota
Don Ross, North Dakota	D	Dennis Huculak, Michigan Tech
Wayne Smith, Denver	D	Tom Polanic, Michigan
Gerry Kell, North Dakota	F	Gary Milroy, Michigan Tech
Mel Wakabayashi, Michigan	F	Doug Roberts, Michigan State
Doug Woog, Minnesota	F	Dennis Hextall, North Dakota

== See also ==
- 1964–65 NCAA College Division men's ice hockey season
