= 1963–64 NCAA men's ice hockey season =

- Duration: November 1963– March 21, 1964
- NCAA tournament: 1964
- National championship: University of Denver Arena; Denver, Colorado
- NCAA champion: Michigan

The 1963–64 NCAA men's ice hockey season began in November 1963 and concluded with the 1964 NCAA Men's Ice Hockey Tournament's championship game on March 21, 1964 at the University of Denver Arena in Denver, Colorado. This was the 17th season in which an NCAA ice hockey championship was held and is the 70th year overall where an NCAA school fielded a team.

This was the final year where no distinction in classification was made for NCAA ice hockey. The following year saw 14 members of the ECAC drop down to a new College Division to separate teams on a more equal financial footing. While some would resurface at the D-I level in later years most would remain in the lower-tier leagues.

This was the first season of play for both Wisconsin and Ohio State as university sponsored clubs. While both were members of the Big Ten Conference they did not play the other three member schools and thus did not qualify for the informal ice hockey conference.

== Regular season ==
=== Season tournaments ===
Tournament	Dates	Teams	Champion
ECAC Holiday Hockey Festival	December 19–20	4	Clarkson
Lake Placid Holiday Tournament	December 20–21	4	St. Lawrence
Boston Garden Christmas Hockey Festival	December 20–23	6	Harvard
Yankee Conference Tournament	December 27–28	4	New Hampshire
Rensselaer Holiday Tournament	January 2–4	4	Rensselaer
Brown Holiday Tournament	January 3–4	4	Colorado College
Beanpot	February 3, 10	4	Boston College

=== Standings ===
1963–64 Big Ten standings
	Conference							Overall					
	GP	W	L	T	PTS	GF	GA	GP	W	L	T	GF	GA
Michigan†	8	7	1	0	14	55	22	29	24	4	1	217	80
Minnesota	8	5	3	0	10	33	36	25	14	11	0	105	115
Michigan State	8	0	8	0	0	22	52	26	8	17	1	100	134
† indicates conference regular season champion

1963–64 ECAC Hockey standings
	Conference							Overall					
	GP	W	L	T	Pct.	GF	GA	GP	W	L	T	GF	GA
Providence†*	19	16	3	0	.842	88	56	26	19	7	0	110	80
Army	21	17	4	0	.810	118	44	28	20	8	0	154	69
Colgate	21	15	6	0	.714	99	48	27	19	8	0	109	59
Harvard	21	15	6	0	.714	95	61	24	17	7	0	108	70
Boston College	24	16	7	1	.688	126	74	28	18	9	1	144	90
Dartmouth	21	14	7	0	.667	106	72	21	14	7	0	106	72
Rensselaer	18	12	6	0	.667	91	50	26	18	8	0	121	69
Clarkson	16	10	5	1	.656	86	48	25	17	7	1	135	76
Northeastern	22	14	8	0	.636	114	81	24	14	10	0	116	92
Vermont	8	4	2	2	.625	45	31	10	5	3	2	54	38
Bowdoin	20	12	8	0	.600	87	66	22	14	8	0	87	66
Brown	22	12	8	2	.591	97	72	24	13	9	2	104	78
Norwich	17	9	7	1	.559	73	65	19	10	8	1	79	74
St. Lawrence	16	8	7	1	.531	61	41	25	13	10	2	91	66
New Hampshire	25	13	12	0	.520	89	112	25	13	12	0	89	112
Cornell	20	9	10	1	.475	55	65	23	12	10	1	64	67
Williams	17	8	9	0	.471	71	100	18	9	9	0	71	100
Merrimack	13	6	7	0	.462	54	56	15	8	7	0	54	56
Massachusetts	16	6	8	2	.438	55	60	17	6	9	2	55	60
Boston University	21	9	12	0	.429	69	63	24	9	13	0	78	74
Hamilton	17	5	12	0	.294	45	90	18	6	12	0	45	90
Connecticut	7	2	5	0	.286	24	54	11	3	8	0	42	74
Colby	20	5	14	1	.275	63	110	19	6	12	1	68	115
Princeton	22	6	16	0	.273	79	113	24	8	16	0	79	113
American International	15	4	11	0	.267	69	97	18	7	11	0	104	103
Middlebury	20	4	16	0	.200	57	125	23	4	19	0	60	136
Yale	20	4	16	0	.200	48	97	22	4	18	0	52	102
Amherst	16	2	14	0	.125	48	94	19	5	14	0	48	94
MIT	10	0	10	0	.000	16	74	16	0	16	0	18	86
Championship: Providence † indicates conference regular season champion * indicates conference tournament champion

1963–64 NCAA Independent ice hockey standings
	Overall					
	GP	W	L	T	GF	GA
Minnesota–Duluth	25	11	14	0	95	95
Ohio State	10	2	8	0	27	104
St. Olaf	8	0	8	0	–	–
Wisconsin	16	8	5	3	81	69

1963–64 Minnesota Intercollegiate Athletic Conference ice hockey standings
	Conference							Overall					
	GP	W	L	T	PTS	GF	GA	GP	W	L	T	GF	GA
Saint Mary's †	–	–	–	–	–	–	–	15	14	1	0	–	–
Macalester	–	–	–	–	–	–	–	–	–	–	–	–	–
Hamline	–	–	–	–	–	–	–	–	–	–	–	–	–
Augsburg	12	4	8	0	.333	–	–	16	7	9	0	–	–
Concordia	–	–	–	–	–	–	–	11	3	7	1	–	–
St. Thomas	–	–	–	–	–	–	–	11	4	6	1	–	–
Saint John's	–	–	–	–	–	–	–	12	3	8	1	–	–
† indicates conference champion

1963–64 Tri-State League standings
	Conference							Overall					
	GP	W	L	T	PTS	GF	GA	GP	W	L	T	GF	GA
Clarkson†	4	2	1	1	5	20	13	25	17	7	1	135	76
St. Lawrence†	4	2	1	1	5	12	7	25	13	10	2	91	66
Rensselaer	4	1	3	0	2	9	21	26	18	8	0	121	69
† indicates conference regular season champion

1963–64 Western Collegiate Hockey Association standings
	Conference							Overall					
	GP	W	L	T	PCT	GF	GA	GP	W	L	T	GF	GA
Michigan†	14	12	2	0	.857	90	37	29	24	4	1	217	80
Denver*	10	7	2	1	.750	33	17	31	20	7	4	141	76
Minnesota	16	10	6	0	.625	65	65	25	14	11	0	105	115
Michigan Tech	16	9	7	0	.563	57	47	27	14	12	1	95	79
North Dakota	14	5	8	1	.393	37	41	25	12	11	2	79	72
Colorado College	16	4	11	1	.281	57	84	26	11	14	1	121	131
Michigan State	14	1	12	1	.107	42	90	26	8	17	1	100	134
Championship: Denver † indicates conference regular season champion * indicates conference tournament champion

== 1964 NCAA Tournament ==
Semifinals; March 19–20
W1	Denver	4
E2	Rensselaer	1
E1	Providence	2
W2	Michigan	3

National Championship; March 21
W1	Denver	3
W2	Michigan	6
Third Place Game
E1	Providence	1
E2	Rensselaer	2

Note: * denotes overtime period(s)

== Player stats ==
=== Scoring leaders ===
The following players led the league in points at the conclusion of the season.

GP = Games played; G = Goals; A = Assists; Pts = Points; PIM = Penalty minutes

Player	Class	Team	GP	G	A	Pts	PIM
Jerry Knightley	Junior	Rensselaer	26	33	42	75	33
Bob Brinkworth	Senior	Rensselaer	26	35	35	70	2
Gary Butler	Senior	Michigan	29	38	30	68	26
Gordon Wilkie	Senior	Michigan	–	16	51	67	20
Wilf Martin	Junior	Michigan	–	34	24	58	10
Corby Adams	Senior	Clarkson	29	27	27	54	–
John Cunniff	Sophomore	Boston College	28	27	25	52	0
Phil Dyer	Sophomore	Boston College	–	–	–	52	–
Grant Heffernan	Junior	Providence	–	18	30	48	–
Tom Polanic	Junior	Michigan	–	8	38	46	92

=== Leading goaltenders ===
The following goaltenders led the league in goals against average at the end of the regular season while playing at least 33% of their team's total minutes.

GP = Games played; Min = Minutes played; W = Wins; L = Losses; OT = Overtime/shootout losses; GA = Goals against; SO = Shutouts; SV% = Save percentage; GAA = Goals against average

Player	Class	Team	GP	Min	W	L	OT	GA	SO	SV%	GAA
Bob Perani	Sophomore	St. Lawrence	21	1270	-	-	-	47	1	.933	2.22
Neil Mieras	Senior	Army	27	1553	19	8	0	59	5	.901	2.28
Buddy Blom	Sophomore	Denver	-	-	19	-	-	-	4	.934	2.30
Bob Bellemore	Sophomore	Providence	26	-	-	-	-	-	-	-	2.47
Bill Sack	Junior	Rensselaer	26	1554	18	8	0	68	4	.920	2.63
Joe Lech	Junior	North Dakota	-	-	-	-	-	-	1	.900	2.69
Garry Bauman	Senior	Michigan Tech	24	-	-	-	-	-	-	.912	2.70
Bob Gray	Senior	Michigan	24	-	-	-	-	65	4	.914	2.70
John Dunham	Senior	Brown	-	-	-	-	-	-	-	-	2.78
Errol McKibbon	Sophomore	Cornell	23	-	-	-	-	-	-	.898	2.83

== Awards ==
=== NCAA ===
Award		Recipient
Spencer Penrose Award		Tom Eccleston, Providence
Most Outstanding Player in NCAA Tournament		Bob Gray, Michigan
AHCA All-American Teams
East Team	Position	West Team
Bob Perani, St. Lawrence	G	Garry Bauman, Michigan Tech
Richie Green, Boston University	D	Carl Lackey, Michigan State
Larry Kish, Providence	D	Tom Polanic, Michigan
Cal Wagner, Clarkson	D	
Corby Adams, Clarkson	F	Craig Falkman, Minnesota
Bob Brinkworth, Rensselaer	F	John Simus, Colorado College
Jerry Knightley, Rensselaer	F	Gordon Wilkie, Michigan

=== WCHA ===
Award		Recipient
Most Valuable Player		none selected
Sophomore of the Year		Tom Polanic, Michigan
Coach of the Year		Al Renfrew, Michigan
All-WCHA Teams
First Team	Position	Second Team
Garry Bauman, Michigan Tech	G	Buddy Blom, Denver
Norm Wimmer, Michigan Tech	D	Wayne Smith, Denver
Tom Polanic, Michigan	D	Jim Kenning, Denver
	D	Carl Lackey, Michigan State
Bill Staub, Denver	F	Craig Falkman, Minnesota
Gordon Wilkie, Michigan	F	Scott Watson, Michigan Tech
Gary Butler, Michigan	F	George Hill, Michigan Tech
John Simus, Colorado College	F	

=== ECAC ===
Award		Recipient
Player of the Year		Bob Brinkworth, Rensselaer
Rookie of the Year		John Cunniff, Boston College
Outstanding Defenseman		Richie Green, Boston University
Most Outstanding Player in Tournament		Bob Perani, St. Lawrence
All-ECAC Hockey Teams
First Team	Position	Second Team
Bob Perani, St. Lawrence	G	Jack Ferriera, Boston University
Bill Sack, Rensselaer	G	Neil Mieras, Army
Larry Kish, Providence	D	Dick Peterson, Army
Jim Salfi, St. Lawrence	D	Bill Grisdale, Rensselaer
Richie Green, Boston University	D	Mike Petterson, Harvard
Fred Kitchen, Rensselaer	D	Robert Gaudreau, Brown
John Mechem, Colby	D	Ron Butterfield, Army
Bob Brinkworth, Rensselaer	F	Brian Wilkinson, Clarkson
Jerry Knightley, Rensselaer	F	Terry Chapman, Brown
Corby Adams, Clarkson	F	Roger Purdie, Clarkson
Gene Kinasewich, Harvard	F	John Keough, Providence
Grant Heffernan, Providence	F	Arnie O'Reilly, St. Lawrence
Ray Mooney, Providence	F	Bruce Fennie, Boston University
John Cunniff, Boston College	F	Steve Riggs, Colgate
Ike Ikauniks, Harvard	F	Dave Ross, St. Lawrence
Mike Thompson, Army	F	Phil Dyer, Boston College
Leo Dupere, Northeastern	F	Bruce Davey, Colby
Leon Bryant, Brown	F	Larry Bone, Northeastern

== Drafted players ==
Round	Pick	Player	College	Conference	NHL team
1	2	Alex Campbell ^{†}	St. Lawrence	ECAC Hockey	Boston Bruins
2	7	Brian Watts ^{†}	Michigan Tech	WCHA	Detroit Red Wings
3	14	Ken Dryden ^{†}	Cornell	ECAC Hockey	Boston Bruins
3	15	Gordie Lowe ^{†}	Cornell	ECAC Hockey	New York Rangers
4	21	Syl Apps Jr. ^{†}	Princeton	ECAC Hockey	New York Rangers

† incoming freshman
