= List of Michigan Wolverines men's ice hockey seasons =

This is a season-by-season list of records compiled by Michigan in men's ice hockey.

The University of Michigan has won nine NCAA Championship in its history, second to the University of Denver's 10 and is tied with Minnesota for the most NCAA tournament appearances (as of 2024).

== Season-by-season results ==
Note: GP = Games played, W = Wins, L = Losses, T = Ties

NCAA D-I Champions	NCAA Frozen Four	Conference regular season champions	Conference Playoff Champions

Season	Conference	Regular Season (Note: Code explanation; GP—Games Played, W—Wins, L—Losses, T—Tied games, 3/SW—Win in 3 on 3 overtime or shootout, Pts—Points*)												Conference Tournament Results	National Tournament Results
Season	Conference	Conference							Overall					Conference Tournament Results	National Tournament Results
Season	Conference	GP	W	L	T	3/SW	Pts*	Finish	GP	W	L	T	%	Conference Tournament Results	National Tournament Results
Joseph Barss (1922 — 1927)
1922–23	Independent	–	–	–	–	–	–	–	11	4	7	0	.364		
1923–24	Independent	–	–	–	–	–	–	–	11	6	4	1	.591		
1924–25	Independent	–	–	–	–	–	–	–	6	4	1	1	.750		
1925–26	Independent	–	–	–	–	–	–	–	10	3	5	2	.400		
1926–27	Independent	–	–	–	–	–	–	–	13	9	4	0	.692		
Eddie Lowrey (1927 — 1944)
1927–28	Independent	–	–	–	–	–	–	–	13	2	10	1	.192		
1928–29	Independent	–	–	–	–	–	–	–	17	5	11	1	.324		
1929–30	Independent	–	–	–	–	–	–	–	21	12	7	2	.619		
1930–31	Independent	–	–	–	–	–	–	–	17	10	5	2	.647		
1931–32	Independent	–	–	–	–	–	–	–	17	9	6	2	.588		
1932–33	Independent	–	–	–	–	–	–	–	16	10	4	2	.688		
1933–34	Independent	–	–	–	–	–	–	–	16	10	6	0	.625		
1934–35	Independent	–	–	–	–	–	–	–	17	12	3	2	.765		
1935–36	Independent	–	–	–	–	–	–	–	16	7	9	0	.438		
1936–37	Independent	–	–	–	–	–	–	–	18	11	6	1	.639		
1937–38	Independent	–	–	–	–	–	–	–	19	13	6	0	.684		
1938–39	Independent	–	–	–	–	–	–	–	18	8	8	2	.500		
1939–40	Independent	–	–	–	–	–	–	–	20	5	14	1	.275		
1940–41	Independent	–	–	–	–	–	–	–	17	2	14	1	.147		
1941–42	Independent	–	–	–	–	–	–	–	18	2	14	2	.167		
1942–43	Independent	–	–	–	–	–	–	–	13	1	10	2	.154		
1943–44	Independent	–	–	–	–	–	–	–	8	5	3	0	.625		
Vic Heyliger (1944 — 1957)
1944–45	Independent	–	–	–	–	–	–	–	9	3	6	0	.333		
1945–46	Independent	–	–	–	–	–	–	–	25	17	7	1	.700		
1946–47	Independent	–	–	–	–	–	–	–	21	13	7	1	.643		
1947–48	Independent	–	–	–	–	–	–	–	23	20	2	1	.891		Won Semifinal, 6–4 (OT) (Boston College); Won Championship, 8–4 (Dartmouth)
1948–49	Independent	–	–	–	–	–	–	–	25	20	2	3	.860		Lost Semifinal, 2–4 (Dartmouth); Won Third-place game, 10–4 (Colorado College)
1949–50	Independent	–	–	–	–	–	–	–	27	23	4	0	.852		Lost Semifinal, 3–4 (Boston University); Won Third-place game, 10–6 (Boston College)
1950–51	Independent	–	–	–	–	–	–	–	27	22	4	1	.833		Won Semifinal, 8–2 (Boston University); Won Championship, 7–1 (Brown)
1951–52	MCHL	12	9	3	0	–	18	T–2nd	26	22	4	0	.846		Won Semifinal, 9–3 (St. Lawrence); Won Championship, 4–1 (Colorado College)
1952–53	MCHL	16	12	4	0	–	19	T–1st	24	17	7	0	.680		Won Semifinal, 14–2 (Boston University); Won Championship, 7–3 (Minnesota)
1953–54	WIHL	16	12	3	1	–	18½	2nd	23	15	6	2	.696		Lost Semifinal, 4–6 (Rensselaer); Won Third-place game, 7–2 (Boston College)
1954–55	WIHL	18	13	5	0	–	16	2nd	24	18	5	1	.771		Won Semifinal, 7–3 (Harvard); Won Championship, 5–3 (Colorado College)
1955–56	WIHL	18	15	2	1	–	19	1st	23	20	2	1	.891		Won Semifinal, 2–1 (OT) (St. Lawrence); Won Championship, 7–5 (Michigan Tech)
1956–57	WIHL	18	13	4	1	–	16½	2nd	25	18	5	2	.760		Won Semifinal, 6–1 (Harvard); Lost Championship, 6–13 (Colorado College)
Al Renfrew (1957 — 1973)
1957–58	WIHL	18	7	11	0	–	9	6th	21	8	13	0	.381		
1958–59	Big Ten	8	2	6	0	–	4	3rd	22	8	13	1	.386		
1959–60	Big Ten	8	4	4	0	–	8	2nd	24	12	12	0	.500		
1959–60	WCHA	18	7	11	0	–	.389	5th	24	12	12	0	.500		
1960–61	Big Ten	8	6	2	0	–	12	1st	28	16	10	2	.607	Lost WCHA Final series, 4–6 (Minnesota)	
1960–61	WCHA	24	15	8	1	–	.646	3rd	28	16	10	2	.607	Lost WCHA Final series, 4–6 (Minnesota)	
1961–62	Big Ten	4	4	0	0	–	1.000	1st	27	22	5	0	.815	Won WCHA Semifinal, 8–4 (Denver); Lost WCHA Championship, 4–6 (Michigan Tech)	Lost Semifinal, 4–5 (Clarkson); Won Third-place game, 5–1 (St. Lawrence)
1961–62	WCHA	18	15	3	0	–	.833	2nd	27	22	5	0	.815	Won WCHA Semifinal, 8–4 (Denver); Lost WCHA Championship, 4–6 (Michigan Tech)	Lost Semifinal, 4–5 (Clarkson); Won Third-place game, 5–1 (St. Lawrence)
1962–63	Big Ten	8	0	6	2	–	2	3rd	24	7	14	3	.354		
1962–63	WCHA	20	3	14	3	–	.225	7th	24	7	14	3	.354		
1963–64	Big Ten	8	7	1	0	–	14	1st	29	24	4	1	.845	Won WCHA Semifinal series, 9–8 (Michigan Tech); Lost WCHA Championship, 2–6 (Denver)	Won Semifinal, 3–2 (Providence); Won Championship, 6–3 (Denver)
1963–64	WCHA	14	12	2	0	–	.857	1st	29	24	4	1	.845	Won WCHA Semifinal series, 9–8 (Michigan Tech); Lost WCHA Championship, 2–6 (Denver)	Won Semifinal, 3–2 (Providence); Won Championship, 6–3 (Denver)
University Division
1964–65	Big Ten	8	3	5	0	–	6	3rd	26	13	12	1	.519		
1964–65	WCHA	18	7	11	0	–	.389	5th	26	13	12	1	.519		
1965–66	Big Ten	8	3	5	0	–	6	3rd	28	14	14	0	.500		
1965–66	WCHA	18	9	9	0	–	.500	5th	28	14	14	0	.500		
1966–67	Big Ten	8	4	3	1	–	9	2nd	28	19	7	2	.714	Lost WCHA first round, 2–4 (Michigan State)	
1966–67	WCHA	18	11	6	1	–	.639	4th	28	19	7	2	.714	Lost WCHA first round, 2–4 (Michigan State)	
1967–68	Big Ten	8	7	1	0	–	14	1st	27	18	9	0	.667	Lost WCHA first round, 3–5 (Minnesota)	
1967–68	WCHA	18	11	7	0	–	.611	4th	27	18	9	0	.667	Lost WCHA first round, 3–5 (Minnesota)	
1968–69	Big Ten	12	7	5	0	–	.583	1st	28	16	12	0	.571	Won WCHA Regional Semifinal, 8–4 (Minnesota); Lost WCHA Regional Final, 4–7 (Michigan Tech)	
1968–69	WCHA	18	10	8	0	–	.556	4th	28	16	12	0	.571	Won WCHA Regional Semifinal, 8–4 (Minnesota); Lost WCHA Regional Final, 4–7 (Michigan Tech)	
1969–70	Big Ten	12	5	7	0	–	10	T–3rd	30	14	16	0	.467	Lost WCHA Regional Semifinal, 1–2 (Wisconsin)	
1969–70	WCHA	24	11	13	0	–	.458	6th	30	14	16	0	.467	Lost WCHA Regional Semifinal, 1–2 (Wisconsin)	
1970–71	Big Ten	10	2	8	0	–	.200	4th	30	9	21	0	.300		
1970–71	WCHA	22	5	17	0	–	.227	9th	30	9	21	0	.300		
1971–72	Big Ten	10	5	5	0	–	10	T–2nd	34	16	18	0	.471	Lost WCHA first round series, 3–15 (North Dakota)	
1971–72	WCHA	28	12	16	0	–	32	6th	34	16	18	0	.471	Lost WCHA first round series, 3–15 (North Dakota)	
1972–73	Big Ten	12	1	11	0	–	2	4th	34	6	27	1	.191		
1972–73	WCHA	30	4	25	1	–	11	10th	34	6	27	1	.191		
Division I
Dan Farrell (1973 — 1980)
1973–74	Big Ten	12	5	6	1	–	11	T–3rd	36	18	17	1	.514	Lost WCHA first round series, 5–10 (Minnesota)	
1973–74	WCHA	28	12	15	1	–	25	7th	36	18	17	1	.514	Lost WCHA first round series, 5–10 (Minnesota)	
1974–75	Big Ten	12	6	6	0	–	12	T–2nd	40	22	17	1	.563	Won WCHA first round series, 13–11 (Colorado College); Lost WCHA second round series, 5–8 (Minnesota)	
1974–75	WCHA	32	17	15	0	–	34	6th	40	22	17	1	.563	Won WCHA first round series, 13–11 (Colorado College); Lost WCHA second round series, 5–8 (Minnesota)	
1975–76	Big Ten	12	8	4	0	–	16	2nd	39	21	18	0	.538	Won WCHA first round series, 12–18 (Notre Dame); Lost WCHA second round series, 7–10 (Michigan Tech)	
1975–76	WCHA	32	17	15	0	–	34	4th	39	21	18	0	.538	Won WCHA first round series, 12–18 (Notre Dame); Lost WCHA second round series, 7–10 (Michigan Tech)	
1976–77	Big Ten	12	7	5	0	–	14	2nd	45	28	17	0	.622	Won WCHA first round series, 11–7 (Michigan Tech); Won WCHA Semifinal series, 17–8 (Denver); Lost WCHA Championship series, 4–9 (Wisconsin)	Won First round, 7–5 (Bowling Green); Won Semifinal, 6–4 (Boston University); Lost Championship, 5–6 (OT) (Wisconsin)
1976–77	WCHA	32	20	12	0	–	40	3rd	45	28	17	0	.622	Won WCHA first round series, 11–7 (Michigan Tech); Won WCHA Semifinal series, 17–8 (Denver); Lost WCHA Championship series, 4–9 (Wisconsin)	Won First round, 7–5 (Bowling Green); Won Semifinal, 6–4 (Boston University); Lost Championship, 5–6 (OT) (Wisconsin)
1977–78	Big Ten	12	6	5	1	–	13	2nd	36	15	20	1	.431		
1977–78	WCHA	32	12	19	1	–	25	T–7th	36	15	20	1	.431		
1978–79	Big Ten	12	3	9	0	–	6	T–3rd	36	8	27	1	.236		
1978–79	WCHA	32	6	25	1	–	13	10th	36	8	27	1	.236		
1979–80	Big Ten	12	7	5	0	–	14	2nd	38	23	13	2	.632	Lost WCHA first round series, 7–11 (Notre Dame)	
1979–80	WCHA	26	13	11	2	–	.538	4th	38	23	13	2	.632	Lost WCHA first round series, 7–11 (Notre Dame)	
Wilf Martin (1980) / John Giordano (1980 — 1984)
1980–81	Big Ten	12	4	8	0	–	.333	3rd	40†	23†	17†	0†	.575	Won WCHA first round series, 10–6 (Denver); Lost WCHA second round series, 2–8 (Michigan Tech)	
1980–81	WCHA	28	15	13	0	–	30	T–5th	40†	23†	17†	0†	.575	Won WCHA first round series, 10–6 (Denver); Lost WCHA second round series, 2–8 (Michigan Tech)	
1981–82	CCHA	30	14	12	4	–	32	T–4th	38	18	15	5	.539	Lost Quarterfinal series, 8–11 (Notre Dame)	
1982–83	CCHA	32	11	21	0	–	22	T–9th	36	14	22	0	.389		
1983–84	CCHA	30	11	18	1	–	.383	9th	37	14	22	1	.392		
Red Berenson (1984 — 2017)
1984–85	CCHA	32	11	20	1	–	23	T–7th	40	13	26	1	.338	Lost Quarterfinal series, 7–10 (Lake Superior State)	
1985–86	CCHA	32	10	22	0	–	20	8th	38	12	26	0	.316	Lost Quarterfinal series, 0–2 (Michigan State)	
1986–87	CCHA	32	11	20	1	–	23	7th	40	14	25	1	.363	Lost Quarterfinal series, 0–2 (Michigan State)	
1987–88	CCHA	32	17	15	0	–	34	5th	41	22	19	0	.537	Lost Quarterfinal series, 1–2 (Western Michigan)	
1988–89	CCHA	32	17	11	4	–	38	4th	41	22	15	4	.585	Lost Quarterfinal series, 1–2 (Bowling Green)	
1989–90	CCHA	32	16	11	5	–	37	4th	42	24	12	6	.585	Won Quarterfinal series, 2–0 (Western Michigan); Lost Semifinal, 2–3 (Michigan State)	
1990–91	CCHA	32	24	5	3	–	51	2nd	47	34	10	3	.755	Won Quarterfinal series, 2–0 (Ohio State); Won Semifinal, 4–2 (Ferris State); Lost Championship, 5–6 (OT) (Lake Superior State)	Won First round series, 2–1 (Cornell); Lost Quarterfinal series, 0–2 (Boston University)
1991–92	CCHA	32	22	7	3	–	47	1st	44	32	9	3	.761	Won Quarterfinal series, 2–0 (Ohio State); Won Semifinal, 6–2 (Miami); Lost Championship, 1–3 (Lake Superior State)	Won Regional Semifinal, 7–6 (Northern Michigan); Lost National Semifinal, 2–4 (Wisconsin)
1992–93	CCHA	30	23	5	2	–	48	2nd	40	30	7	3	.788	Won First round series, 2–0 (Notre Dame); Lost Semifinal, 3–5 (Lake Superior State)	Won Regional Semifinal, 4–3 (OT) (Wisconsin); Lost National Semifinal, 3–4 (OT) (Maine)
1993–94	CCHA	30	24	5	1	–	49	1st	41	33	7	1	.817	Won First round series, 2–0 (Kent State); Won Semifinal, 6–4 (Western Michigan); Won Championship, 3–0 (Lake Superior State)	Lost Regional Semifinal, 4–5 (OT) (Lake Superior State)
1994–95	CCHA	27	22	4	1	–	45	1st	39	30	8	1	.782	Won Quarterfinal series, 2–0 (Ohio State); Lost Semifinal, 4–5 (OT) (Lake Superior State)	Won Regional Semifinal, 4–3 (Wisconsin); Lost National Semifinal, 3–4 (3OT) (Maine)
1995–96	CCHA	30	22	6	2	–	46	T–1st	43	34	7	2	.814	Won Quarterfinal series, 2–0 (Miami); Won Semifinal, 6–2 (Michigan State); Won Championship, 4–3 (Lake Superior State)	Won Regional Semifinal, 4–3 (Minnesota); Won National Semifinal, 4–0 (Boston University); Won National Championship, 3–2 (OT) (Colorado College)
1996–97	CCHA	27	21	3	3	–	46	T–1st	43	35	4	4	.860	Won Quarterfinal series, 2–0 (Alaska–Fairbanks); Won Semifinal, 7–2 (Bowling Green); Won Championship, 3–1 (Michigan State)	Won Regional Semifinal, 7–4 (Minnesota); Lost National Semifinal, 2–3 (Boston University)
1997–98	CCHA	30	22	7	1	–	45	2nd	45	34	11	1	.750	Won Quarterfinal series, 2–1 (Notre Dame); Lost Semifinal, 2–4 (Ohio State)	Won Regional Quarterfinal, 2–1 (Princeton); Won regional Semifinal, 4–3 (North Dakota); Won National Semifinal, 4–0 (New Hampshire); Won National Championship, 3–2 (OT) (Boston College)
1998–99	CCHA	30	17	8	5	–	39	2nd	42	25	11	6	.675	Won Quarterfinal series, 2–0 (Bowling Green); Won Semifinal, 3–2 (Ohio State); Won Championship, 5–1 (Northern Michigan)	Won Regional Quarterfinal, 5–3 (Denver); Lost regional Semifinal, 1–2 (OT) (New Hampshire)
1999–00	CCHA	28	19	6	3	–	41	1st	41	27	10	4	.707	Won First round series, 2–0 (Western Michigan); Lost Semifinal, 4–7 (Nebraska–Omaha)	Won Regional Quarterfinal, 4–3 (OT) (Colgate); Lost regional Semifinal, 2–5 (Maine)
2000–01	CCHA	28	16	9	3	–	35	3rd	45	27	13	5	.656	Won First round series, 2–0 (Ferris State); Won Semifinal, 3–2 (Nebraska–Omaha); Lost Championship, 0–2 (Michigan State)	Won Regional Quarterfinal, 4–3 (Mercyhurst); Won regional Semifinal, 4–3 (St. Cloud State); Lost National Semifinal, 2–4 (Boston College)
2001–02	CCHA	28	19	5	4	–	42	1st	44	28	11	5	.693	Won First round series, 2–1 (Lake Superior State); Won Semifinal, 2–1 (Ohio State); Won Championship, 3–2 (Michigan State)	Won Regional Quarterfinal, 4–2 (St. Cloud State); Won Regional Semifinal, 5–3 (Denver); Lost National Semifinal, 2–3 (Minnesota)
2002–03	CCHA	28	18	7	3	–	39	2nd	43	30	10	3	.733	Won First round series, 2–1 (Lake Superior State); Won Semifinal, 3–0 (Ohio State); Won Championship, 5–3 (Ferris State)	Won Regional Semifinal, 2–1 (Maine); Won Regional Final, 5–3 (Colorado College); Lost National Semifinal, 2–3 (OT) (Minnesota)
2003–04	CCHA	28	18	8	2	–	38	1st	43	27	14	2	.651	Won First round series, 2–1 (Nebraska–Omaha); Won Semifinal, 5–1 (Northern Michigan); Lost Championship, 2–4 (Ohio State)	Won Regional Semifinal, 4–1 (New Hampshire); Lost Regional Final, 2–3 (OT) (Boston College)
2004–05	CCHA	28	23	3	2	–	48	1st	42	31	8	3	.774	Won First round series, 2–0 (Notre Dame); Won Semifinal, 3–1 (Alaska–Fairbanks); Won Championship, 4–2 (Ohio State)	Won Regional Semifinal, 4–1 (Wisconsin); Lost Regional Final, 3–4 (Colorado College)
2005–06	CCHA	28	13	10	5	–	31	3rd	41	21	15	5	.573	Won Quarterfinal series, 2–0 (Ferris State); Lost Semifinal, 1–4 (Michigan State); Won Third-place game, 3–2 (Northern Michigan)	Lost Regional Semifinal, 1–5 (North Dakota)
2006–07	CCHA	28	18	9	1	–	37	2nd	41	26	14	1	.646	Won Quarterfinal series, 2–0 (Northern Michigan); Won Semifinal, 5–2 (Michigan State); Lost Championship, 1–2 (Notre Dame)	Lost Regional Semifinal, 5–8 (North Dakota)
2007–08	CCHA	28	20	4	4	–	44	1st	43	33	6	4	.814	Won Quarterfinal series, 2–0 (Nebraska–Omaha); Won Semifinal, 6–4 (Northern Michigan); Won Championship, 2–1 (Miami)	Won Regional Semifinal, 4–1 (Niagara); Won Regional Final, 2–0 (Clarkson); Lost National Semifinal, 4–5 (OT) (Notre Dame)
2008–09	CCHA	28	20	8	0	0	40	T–2nd	41	29	12	0	.707	Won Quarterfinal series, 2–0 (Western Michigan); Won Semifinal, 3–1 (Alaska); Lost Championship, 2–5 (Notre Dame)	Lost Regional Semifinal, 0–2 (Air Force)
2009–10	CCHA	28	14	13	1	0	43	7th	45	26	18	1	.589	Won First round series, 2–0 (Lake Superior State); Won Quarterfinal series, 2–0 (Michigan State); Won Semifinal, 5–2 (Miami); Won Championship, 2–1 (Northern Michigan)	Won Regional Semifinal, 5–1 (Bemidji State); Lost Regional Final, 2–3 (2OT) (Miami)
2010–11	CCHA	28	20	7	1	0	61	1st	44	29	11	4	.705	Won Quarterfinal series, 2–0 (Bowling Green); Lost Semifinal, 2–5 (Western Michigan); Won Third-place game, 4–2 (Notre Dame)	Won Regional Semifinal, 3–2 (OT) (Nebraska–Omaha); Won Regional Final, 2–1 (Colorado College); Won National Semifinal, 2–0 (North Dakota); Lost National Championship, 2–3 (OT) (Minnesota–Duluth)
2011–12	CCHA	28	15	9	4	1	50	T–2nd	41	24	13	4	.634	Won Quarterfinal series, 2–0 (Notre Dame); Won Semifinal, 3–2 (OT) (Bowling Green); Lost Championship, 2–3 (Western Michigan)	Lost Regional Semifinal, 2–3 (OT) (Cornell)
2012–13	CCHA	28	10	15	3	3	36	7th	40	18	19	3	.488	Won First round series, 2–0 (Northern Michigan); Won Quarterfinal series, 2–0 (Western Michigan); Won Semifinal, 6–2 (Miami); Lost Championship, 1–3 (Notre Dame)	
2013–14	Big Ten	20	10	8	2	1	33	3rd	35	18	13	4	.571	Lost Quarterfinal, 1–2 (2OT) (Penn State)	
2014–15	Big Ten	20	12	8	0	0	36	3rd	37	22	15	0	.595	Won Quarterfinal, 5–1 (Wisconsin); Won Semifinal, 4–1 (Michigan State); Lost Championship, 2–4 (Minnesota)	
2015–16	Big Ten	20	12	5	3	2	41	2nd	38	25	8	5	.724	Won Semifinal, 7–2 (Penn State); Won Championship, 5–3 (Minnesota)	Won Regional Semifinal, 3–2 (OT) (Notre Dame); Lost Regional Final, 2–5 (North Dakota)
2016–17	Big Ten	20	6	12	2	2	22	5th	35	13	19	3	.414	Lost Quarterfinal, 1–4 (Penn State)	
Mel Pearson (2017 — 2022)
2017–18	Big Ten	24	11	10	3	2	38	3rd	40	22	15	3	.588	Won Quarterfinal series, 2–0 (Wisconsin); Lost Semifinal, 2–3 (OT) (Ohio State)	Won Regional Semifinal, 3–2 (Northeastern); Won Regional Final, 6–3 (Boston University); Lost National Semifinal, 3–4 (Notre Dame)
2018–19	Big Ten	24	9	10	5	2	34	T–5th	36	13	16	7	.458	Lost Quarterfinal series, 0–2 (Minnesota)	
2019–20	Big Ten	24	11	10	3	2	38	T–2nd	36	18	14	4	.556	Won Quarterfinal series, 2–0 (Michigan State); Tournament Cancelled	
2020–21	Big Ten	20	11	9	0	0	32	4th	26	15	10	1	.596	Won Quarterfinal, 4–0 (Ohio State); Lost Semifinal, 2–3 (OT) (Minnesota)	Removed from tournament due to positive COVID-19 test results
2021–22	Big Ten	24	16	8	0	0	51	2nd	39	29	9	1	.756	Won Quarterfinal series, 2–0 (Michigan State); Won Semifinal 2–1 (Notre Dame); Won Championship, 4–3 (Minnesota)	Won Regional Semifinal, 5–3 (American International); Won Regional Final, 7–4 (Quinnipiac); Lost National Semifinal, 2–3 (OT) (Denver)
Brandon Naurato (2022 — present)
2022–23	Big Ten	24	12	10	2	0	38	2nd	41	26	12	3	.671	Won Quarterfinal series, 2–0 (Wisconsin); Won Semifinal 7–3 (Ohio State); Won Championship, 4–3 (Minnesota)	Won Regional Semifinal, 11–1 (Colgate); Won Regional Final, 2–1 (OT) (Penn State); Lost National Semifinal, 2–5 (Quinnipiac)
2023–24	Big Ten	24	11	11	2	1	36	4th	41	23	15	3	.598	Won Quarterfinal series, 2–0 (Notre Dame); Won Semifinal 2–1 (Minnesota); Lost Championship, 5–4 (OT) (Michigan State)	Won Regional Semifinal, 4–3 (North Dakota); Won Regional Final, 5–2 (Michigan State); Lost National Semifinal, 0–4 (Boston College)
2024–25	Big Ten	24	12	10	2	2	36	4th	36	18	15	3	.542	Lost Quarterfinal series, 2–0 (Penn State)	
2025–26	Big Ten	24	17	6	1	1	49	2nd	40	31	8	1	.788	Won Quarterfinal series, 6–1 (Notre Dame); Won Semifinal 5–2 (Penn State); Won Championship, 7–3 (Ohio State)	Won Regional Semifinal, 5–1 (Bentley); Won Regional Final, 4–3 (Minnesota Duluth); Lost National Semifinal, 3–4 (2OT) (Denver)
Totals									GP	W	L	T	%	Championships	
Regular Season									2905	1667	1071	174	.602	3 MCHL/WIHL/WCHA Championships, 5 Big Ten Championships, 11 CCHA Championships	
Conference Post-season									183	119	61	3	.658	9 CCHA tournament championships, 4 Big Ten tournament championships	
NCAA Post-season									95	61	34	0	.642	42 NCAA Tournament appearances	
Regular Season and Post-season Record									3183	1842	1166	178	.606	9 NCAA Division I National Championships	

* Winning percentage is used when conference schedules are unbalanced.
† Wilf Martin resigned after two games due to ill health.
