= 1963–64 Michigan Wolverines men's ice hockey season =

Sports season

National champion Big Ten Champion WCHA Champion NCAA Tournament, champion
- Conference: 1st Big Ten / 1st WCHA
- Home ice: Michigan Coliseum

Record
- Overall: 24–4–1
- Conference: 7–1–0 / 12–2–0
- Home: 14–2–1
- Road: 8–2–0
- Neutral: 2–0–0

Coaches and captains
- Head coach: Al Renfrew
- Captain: Gordon Wilkie

The 1963–64 Michigan Wolverines men's ice hockey team represented the University of Michigan in college ice hockey. In its seventh year under head coach Al Renfrew, the team compiled a 24–4–1 record (12–2 against Western Collegiate Hockey Association (WCHA) opponents) and outscored all opponents 217 to 80. The Wolverines advanced to the 1964 NCAA Division I Men's Ice Hockey Tournament. They defeated the Providence Friars in the first round of the Frozen Four and then defeated the Denver Pioneers by a 6–3 score in the national championship game in Denver, Colorado.

Goalie Bob Gray was chosen as the Most Outstanding Player in the NCAA Tournament. He had four shutouts and a .914 save percentage for the season. The team's leading scorer was junior forward Gary Butler with 38 goals, 30 assists, and 68 total points. Team captain Gordon Wilkie followed with 16 goals, 51 assists, and 67 total points. The team set a new program record with 24 wins, eclipsing the old record of 23 set in the 1949–50 season.

== Season ==
Michigan was coming off a season in which the team finished last in the WCHA and failed to win a conference game in Big Ten play. The roster included only four seniors, Gary Butler, Ron Coristine, Bob Gray, and team captain Gordon Wilkie — while the sophomore class later proved to be one of the program's strongest.

The Wolverines opened at home against Queen's, winning both games 9–5 and piling up 141 shots in the two contests. After a weekend off the maize and Blue played host to Toronto and split the series. The second game provided Michigan with their first shutout since December 1960, coincidentally that was also against the Varsity Blues.

The team closed up shop during the winter break and returned to the ice a week before the spring semester began with a trip to Minnesota where they played a pair of series against the Golden Gophers and Minnesota–Duluth. After dominating the Bulldogs Michigan opened their conference schedule with a 5–1 win against Minnesota before their Big Ten rival repaid the favor with a 6–5 victory. The Wolverine's offense was firing on all cylinders at this time with the team averaging 7 goals per game. Gary Butler was leading in all three scoring categories (15 goals, 12 assists, 27 points) while the top line of Butler-Wilkie-Cole had combined to nearly equal all their opponent's goal totals (26 vs. 28). As the second semester began the team welcomed a new addition in Mel Wakabayashi. The Wolverines celebrated by thoroughly dominating visiting Loyola in two games, outscoring their opponents 26-3 in the series. Eleven different players scored goals against the Warriors but it was sophomore Wilf Martin who led the way with 5 goals and 4 assists over the weekend. With Michigan having built their record to 8–2 head coach Al Renfrew thought his team had a chance to be better than his third-place squad two years earlier but it still had work to do.

The following weekend Michigan Tech arrived in town and though they were having a relatively poor season the Huskies had typically given Michigan a good showing. In the first game the Wolverines were the better team from the start, winning 6–2 with some heroics from Bob Gray in the middle frame. The second game was a much tighter affair with Gray and Tech netminder Garry Bauman keeping everyone off of the scoresheet until 3 seconds remained in the second when Wilf Martin broke the tie. The floodgates opened in the third with MTU and Michigan exchanging goals 6 times before sophomore Barry MacDonald salted the game away and the Wolverines skated off with a 5–3 victory.

After downing a bad Colorado College team in two home games, Michigan went on the road to play two Ohio teams for the first time in program history. In the game against Ohio Michigan got off to a fast start and never looked back, scoring seven times in the opening frame. The Bobcats responded in the second, upping their play and coming close to scoring several times but Bob Gray kept everything out of the net. The extra effort seemed to sap Ohio who were outshot 21–2 in the third period and allowed a further 6 goals. Gray's shutout was his third of the season and set a new team record. The following night Michigan took on football rival Ohio State in the Buckeyes' first season on the ice. Because Ohio State was hampered by injuries the teams agreed to play with a running clock but that still didn't prevent Michigan from establishing several new program records. Michigan scored 21 goals to set both a program record and an NCAA record (since tournament play began) not only for the most goals scored in a game but for the largest margin of victory. The offensive outburst also raised Michigan's production to more than 9 goals per game. Backup goaltender Bill Bieber was in net and recorded the first shutout of his varsity career while Bob Gray played center and scored the first goals of his college career, including the 18th marker of the game that broke the previous program record.

The Wolverines returned to Michigan and began a home-and-home series against arch-rival Michigan State. The Maize and Blue won the first game 2–0 with bob Gray earning his fourth shutout of the season, increasing his program record and establishing a mark that wouldn't be broken until 1996. The win was also the third consecutive shutout for Michigan, a record that still stands (as of 2018). In the second Game Michigan scored early and shortly thereafter MSU's starting netminder, Harry Woolf, had to be removed due to back spasms. Backup Alex Terpay stopped several breakaways but the Spartans were outmatched and Michigan scored the next four goals before MSU could answer. State's first goal, at 16:12 in the second, ended a 232 and 18 second shutout streak for the Wolverines that had begun two weeks earlier against Colorado College; It is by far the longest such period in team history.

Michigan continued their Big Ten and WCHA dominance the following week with a pair of wins against Minnesota before hitting the road again and heading to Houghton. Michigan suffered only their third loss of the season in a fight-filled affair with Tech while Bauman held Michigan to a season-low 1 goal. With Bieber in net for the second game Michigan rebounded to earn a split while Michigan Tech lost Scott Watson for the season with a broken leg. Michigan finished out their schedule with a second home-and-home series against MSU, winning both games easily to finish atop both the Big Ten and WCHA standings. It was the Wolverines third Big Ten title and their first WCHA crown since the league had reformed in 1959.

Because of the peculiarities of the WCHA schedule requirement, Michigan had not played either Denver or North Dakota during the season. While the Fighting Sioux had a relatively poor season, Denver had finished second in the league and likely would have put up much tougher competition that the Wolverines had faced to that point. In any event the Wolverines used their top billing to host Michigan Tech in the WCHA first round series. While Renfrew didn't think his team played particularly well the Wolverines skated away with a narrow 4–3 victory in the first game with Wilf Martin recording the game-winner. With only a 1-goal lead to work with Michigan had to scramble when Tech opened the scoring with a goal in the first. The Wolverines tied the game before the frame ended but MTU got their second lead early in the middle period. Michigan responded with two goals of their own before exchanging a pair late to enter the third with Michigan up 4–3. Tech refused to quit and opened a barrage on Bob Gray, scoring twice to take the lead 5–4. While Michigan Tech was ahead after 60 minutes the series was now tied at 8 goals apiece and Michigan played in its first overtime game of the season. It took two extra periods to decide the series but in the end it was Blue's Jack Cole who sent Michigan to the WCHA title game.

Michigan welcomed Denver into Ann Arbor and, despite hiving to travel from Colorado after having played the night before, the Pioneers were the team with live legs. Denver scored twice in the first five minutes of the game and while Michigan halved their lead the Wolverines were uncharacteristically lethargic after their double overtime victory. Michigan had several chances to score but could only find the back of the net twice while DU was able to put six behind Bob Gray on only 16 shots.

Despite the unsatisfying finish to the conference tournament, Michigan's runner-up finish and WCHA regular season title earned them the second western seed and the Wolverines headed to Denver to participate in their 12th NCAA championship. Michigan opened against ECAC Hockey champion Providence and squeaked by the Friars 3–2 to set up a rematch with Denver for the NCAA championship. Playing in their home building, the Pioneers started the game by firing 15 shots on goal in the first but Bob Gray turned everything away, allowing Wilf Martin to open the scoring with just under 2 minutes left. Wakabayashi increased the Wolverines' lead with a power play marker early in the second and was followed soon thereafter by Jack Cole to build the Michigan lead to 3–0. Denver was able to close the gap with two goals in the final 15 minutes of the period but when Cole scored his second of the night early in the third Michigan put the pressure on the Pioneers. Future NHLer Wayne Smith cut the lead to 1 just before the half-way point of the period but Michigan's offense took over and scored twice more to take revenge on Denver and win their seventh National championship, the first under Renfrew.

Wilkie, Polanic and Gray were named to All-Tournament first team while MacDonald and Wakabayashi made it onto the second team. Gray received the tournament MOP for his stellar play.

After the season Wilkie and Polanic were named as AHCA All-Americans and were joined by Butler on the All-WCHA First Team. Renfrew received the WCHA Coach of the Year while Polanic was awarded the WCHA Sophomore of the Year. For the only time in league history (as of 2018) the WCHA did not name a Most Valuable Player.

The team won the national championship in 1964 against the University of Denver 6-3 in the finals on March 21,1964.

== Standings ==
1963–64 Big Ten standings
	Conference							Overall					
	GP	W	L	T	PTS	GF	GA	GP	W	L	T	GF	GA
Michigan†	8	7	1	0	14	55	22	29	24	4	1	217	80
Minnesota	8	5	3	0	10	33	36	25	14	11	0	105	115
Michigan State	8	0	8	0	0	22	52	26	8	17	1	100	134
† indicates conference regular season champion

1963–64 Western Collegiate Hockey Association standings
	Conference							Overall					
	GP	W	L	T	PCT	GF	GA	GP	W	L	T	GF	GA
Michigan†	14	12	2	0	.857	90	37	29	24	4	1	217	80
Denver*	10	7	2	1	.750	33	17	31	20	7	4	141	76
Minnesota	16	10	6	0	.625	65	65	25	14	11	0	105	115
Michigan Tech	16	9	7	0	.563	57	47	27	14	12	1	95	79
North Dakota	14	5	8	1	.393	37	41	25	12	11	2	79	72
Colorado College	16	4	11	1	.281	57	84	26	11	14	1	121	131
Michigan State	14	1	12	1	.107	42	90	26	8	17	1	100	134
Championship: Denver † indicates conference regular season champion * indicates conference tournament champion

== Schedule ==
During the season, Michigan compiled a 24–4–1. Its schedule was as follows.

Date	Opponent^{#}	Rank^{#}	Site	Result	Record
Regular season
November 29	vs. Queen's*		Weinberg Coliseum • Ann Arbor, Michigan	W 9–5	1–0
November 30	vs. Queen's*		Weinberg Coliseum • Ann Arbor, Michigan	W 9–5	2–0
December 13	vs. Toronto*		Weinberg Coliseum • Ann Arbor, Michigan	L 3–5	2–1
December 14	vs. Toronto*		Weinberg Coliseum • Ann Arbor, Michigan	W 10–0	3–1
January 7	at Minnesota–Duluth*		Duluth Curling and Skating Club • Duluth, Minnesota	W 8–4	4–1
January 8	at Minnesota–Duluth*		Duluth Curling and Skating Club • Duluth, Minnesota	W 7–2	5–1
January 10	at Minnesota		Williams Arena • Minneapolis, Minnesota	W 5–1	6–1 (1–0 / 1–0)
January 11	at Minnesota		Williams Arena • Minneapolis, Minnesota	L 5–6	6–2 (1–1 / 1–1)
January 17	vs. Loyola*		Weinberg Coliseum • Ann Arbor, Michigan	W 12–1	7–2 (1–1 / 1–1)
January 18	vs. Loyola*		Weinberg Coliseum • Ann Arbor, Michigan	W 14–2	8–2 (1–1 / 1–1)
January 24	vs. Michigan Tech		Weinberg Coliseum • Ann Arbor, Michigan	W 6–2	9–2 (1–1 / 2–1)
January 25	vs. Michigan Tech		Weinberg Coliseum • Ann Arbor, Michigan	W 5–3	10–2 (1–1 / 3–1)
January 31	vs. Colorado College		Weinberg Coliseum • Ann Arbor, Michigan	W 7–0	11–2 (1–1 / 4–1)
February 1	vs. Colorado College		Weinberg Coliseum • Ann Arbor, Michigan	W 12–4	12–2 (1–1 / 5–1)
February 7	at Ohio*		Ossian C. Bird Arena • Athens, Ohio	W 14–0	13–2 (1–1 / 5–1)
February 8	at Ohio State*		OSU Ice Rink • Columbus, Ohio	W 21–0	14–2 (1–1 / 5–1)
February 14	at Michigan State		Demonstration Hall • East Lansing, Michigan	W 2–0	15–2 (2–1 / 6–1)
February 15	vs. Michigan State		Weinberg Coliseum • Ann Arbor, Michigan	W 7–2	16–2 (3–1 / 7–1)
February 21	vs. Minnesota		Weinberg Coliseum • Ann Arbor, Michigan	W 6–3	17–2 (4–1 / 8–1)
February 22	vs. Minnesota		Weinberg Coliseum • Ann Arbor, Michigan	W 8–2	18–2 (5–1 / 9–1)
February 28	at Michigan Tech		Dee Stadium • Houghton, Michigan	L 1–3	18–3 (5–1 / 9–2)
February 29	at Michigan Tech		Dee Stadium • Houghton, Michigan	W 4–3	19–3 (5–1 / 10–2)
March 6	at Michigan State		Demonstration Hall • East Lansing, Michigan	W 9–4	20–3 (6–1 / 11–2)
March 7	vs. Michigan State		Weinberg Coliseum • Ann Arbor, Michigan	W 13–4	21–3 (7–1 / 12–2)
WCHA Tournament
March 12	vs. Michigan Tech*		Weinberg Coliseum • Ann Arbor, Michigan (WCHA Semifinal game 1)	W 4–3	22–3 (7–1 / 12–2)
March 13	vs. Michigan Tech*		Weinberg Coliseum • Ann Arbor, Michigan (WCHA Semifinal game 2)	T 5–5 ^{2OT}	22–3–1 (7–1 / 12–2)
March 14	vs. Denver*		Weinberg Coliseum • Ann Arbor, Michigan (WCHA Championship)	L 2–6	22–4–1 (7–1 / 12–2)
NCAA Tournament
March 20	vs. Providence*		DU Arena • Denver, Colorado (National Semifinal)	W 3–2	23–4–1 (7–1 / 12–2)
March 21	vs. Denver*		DU Arena • Denver, Colorado (National Championship)	W 6–3	24–4–1 (7–1 / 12–2)
*Non-conference game. ^{#}Rankings from USCHO.com Poll. Source:

== Roster and scoring statistics ==
No.	Name	Year	Position	Hometown	S/P/C	Games	Goals	Assists	Pts	PIM
18	Gary Butler	Senior	F	Regina, SK	(Saskatchewan)	29	38	30	68	26
19	Gordon Wilkie	Senior	C	Regina, SK	(Saskatchewan)	–	16	51	67	20
7	Wilf Martin	Sophomore	C	St. Paul, AB	(Alberta)	–	34	24	58	10
2	Tom Polanic	Sophomore	D	Toronto, ON	(Ontario)	–	8	38	46	92
6	Jack Cole	Junior	F	Oshawa, ON	(Ontario)	–	22	23	45	39
9	Mel Wakabayashi	Sophomore	C	Slocan City, BC	(British Columbia)	–	21	17	38	2
12	Ron Coristine	Senior	LW	Chatham, ON	(Ontario)	–	15	23	38	26
13	Barry MacDonald	Sophomore	F	Montreal, PQ	(Quebec)	–	15	19	34	70
10	Bob Ferguson	Sophomore	F	Toronto, ON	(Ontario)	–	10	21	31	56
5	Pierre Dechaine	Sophomore	F	Mallaig, AB	(Alberta)	–	7	13	20	14
16	Marty Read	Junior	F	Regina, SK	(Saskatchewan)	–	7	12	19	16
14	George Forrest	Junior	F	Birmingham, MI	(Michigan)	–	5	8	13	8
11	Roger Galipeau	Junior	D	Sturgeon Falls, ON	(Ontario)	–	2	7	9	40
4	Rick Day	Sophomore	D	Timmins, ON	(Ontario)	–	0	6	6	12
17	Dave Newton	Junior	D	Ann Arbor, MI	(Michigan)	–	1	4	5	8
3	Ted Henderson	Sophomore	D	Owen Sound, ON	(Ontario)	–	–	–	–	–
8	Alex Hood	Junior	RW	Regina, SK	(Saskatchewan)	–	–	–	–	–
1	Bill Bieber	Junior	G	Chatham, ON	(Ontario)	6	–	–	–	–
1	Bob Gray	Senior	G	Owen Sound, ON	(Ontario)	24	–	–	–	–
Total							217			

== Goaltending statistics ==
No.	Name	Games	Minutes	Wins	Losses	Ties	Goals against	Saves	Shut outs	SV %	GAA
1	Bob Gray	24	–	–	–	–	65	687	4	.914	2.7
1	Bill Bieber	6	–	–	–	–	15	109	1	.879	2.5
Total		29	–	24	4	1	80	–	5	–	2.76

== 1964 championship game ==
The 1964 NCAA Division I Men's Ice Hockey Tournament was held at University of Denver Arena in Denver, Colorado, on March 20 and 21, 1964. The teams invited to participate in the Frozen Four were the Providence Friars and the RPI Engineers from the East and Michigan and the Denver Pioneers from the West.

On March 20, 1964, Michigan defeated Providence by a 3–2 score in a semifinal game. Michigan trailed, 2–1, but tied the game on a goal by Ron Coristine at 12:33 of the third period. Gary Butler scored the winning goal on a pass from Gordon Wilkie at 15:23 of the third period.

On March 21, 1964, the Wolverines faced the Denver Pioneers in the championship game. Michigan had lost to Denver by a 6–2 score in the finals of the WCHA Tournament one week earlier in Ann Arbor. In the NCAA championship game, Michigan took a 1–0 lead after 18 minutes of play on a goal by Wilf Martin. The Wolverines increased the lead to 2–0 with a goal by center Mel Wakabayashi at 2:19 of the second period. One minute later, they extended the lead to 3–0 on a goal by Jack Cole. Denver closed the score to 4–3 in the third period. Michigan scored twice in the final four minutes. Center Mel Wakabayashi and Jack Cole each scored two goals for Michigan.

=== W1 Denver vs. W2 Michigan ===
March 21	Denver	3 – 6	Michigan	University of Denver Arena

Scoring summary
Period	Team	Goal	Assist(s)	Time	Score
1st	UM	Wilf Martin	Hood and Polanic	17:48	1–0 UM
2nd	UM	Mel Wakabayashi – PP	Ferguson and Wilkie	22:19	2–0 UM
2nd	UM	Jack Cole	Wilkie	23:22	3–0 UM
2nd	DEN	Bill Staub – PP	Herrebout and Lindsay	25:34	3–1 UM
2nd	DEN	Ron Livingstone	Sampson and Naslund	37:24	3–2 UM
3rd	UM	Jack Cole – GW	Polanic and Wilkie	44:08	4–2 UM
3rd	DEN	Wayne Smith – PP	Herrebout	49:54	4–3 UM
3rd	UM	Mel Wakabayashi	Coristine and Ferguson	56:49	5–3 UM
3rd	UM	Alex Hood	Polanic and Martin	58:24	6–3 UM

Shots by period
Team	1	2	3	T
Michigan	7	6	16	29
Denver	15	10	9	34

Goaltenders
Team	Name	Saves	Goals against	Time on ice
UM	Bob Gray	31	3	
DEN	Buddy Blom	23	6	

== See also ==
- 1964 NCAA Division I Men's Ice Hockey Tournament
- List of NCAA Division I Men's Ice Hockey Tournament champions
