= Paul Fricker =

Canadian ice hockey player

- Born: October 20, 1960 (age 66) Toronto, Ontario, Canada
- Height: 6 ft 1 in (185 cm)
- Weight: 190 lb (86 kg; 13 st 8 lb)
- Position: Goaltender
- Caught: Left
- Played for: Michigan; Binghamton Whalers; Oklahoma City Stars; Salt Lake Golden Eagles
- NHL draft: 176th, 1980; Hartford Whalers
- Playing career: 1979–1985
- Coaching career

Biographical details
- Education: University of Michigan

Coaching career (HC unless noted)
- 1986–1987: Delta Flyers
- 2004–2011: Seattle Thunderbirds (goalie)
- 2011–2013: Vancouver Giants (goalie)
- 2014–Present: Vancouver Giants (goalie)

Head coaching record
- Overall: 29–23–0 (.558)

Paul David Allen Fricker is a Canadian retired ice hockey goaltender who was an All-American for Michigan.

== Career ==
While born in Toronto, Fricker played his junior hockey in British Columbia, reaching the WHL for 1 game 1979. Because it was just a single game, Fricker was able to retain his college eligibility by not receiving payment for his services. That fall he began attending Michigan in the final recruiting class for Dan Farrell. Fricker played 35 games and helped the team recover from a dismal season the year before by winning 20 games and lifting the Wolverines up to 4th in the conference. Though the team was knocked out in the first round of the playoffs, Fricker had made enough of a name for himself to be drafted by the Hartford Whalers.

Entering his second season, Fricker got a new head coach in Wilf Martin, however, the bench boss lasted just 4 games due to ill health and was replaced by John Giordano. The change didn't seem to bother Fricker as he posted very similar marks to what he had the year before and was named an All-American. This time he was able to help the Wolverines win their first round matchup but were helpless against Michigan Tech in the second round and lost 2–9 on aggregate. After the season Fricker passed on his final two years of eligibility and signed a professional contract with the Whalers.

He began the next season in Hartford's minor league system, playing the bulk of the year with the Oklahoma City Stars before transitioning to the AHL in 1982. Fricker showed promise in his first full season with Binghamton, splitting time in net, but his numbers ballooned in 1984 and he was released by Hartford after the year. Fricker played 4 games the following year before calling it a career and returned home.

Fricker became the head coach for the Delta Flyers in 1986 but lasted just a season behind the bench. A few years later he founded 'The Goalie Store' a small business that manufactured custom ice hockey and lacrosse goaltending equipment. On the company website, Fricker would post articles giving tips about how to play the position and he was able to parlay that knowledge into eventually becoming the goaltending coach for the Seattle Thunderbirds. Fricker remained with Seattle for seven years before taking the same job closer to home with the Vancouver Giants. He was let go 11 games into his third season after the team's terrible start. Fricker was only gone from the Giants for a short time and he was brought back to his former post when there was no sign of improvement from the team's two starters. He continues to serve in that capacity as of 2021.

== Statistics ==
=== Regular season and playoffs ===
			Regular season									Playoffs
Season	Team	League	GP	W	L	T	MIN	GA	SO	GAA	SV%	GP	W	L	MIN	GA	SO	GAA	SV%
1977–78	Vancouver Jr. Canucks	PJHL	—	—	—	—	1800	174	0	5.80	—	—	—	—	—	—	—	—	—
1978–79	Richmond Sockeyes	PJHL	—	—	—	—	1630	100	0	3.68	—	—	—	—	—	—	—	—	—
1978–79	Victoria Cougars	WHL	1	1	0	0	40	3	0	4.50	.842	—	—	—	—	—	—	—	—
1979–80	Michigan	WCHA	35	20	12	2	2032	148	0	4.37	.883	—	—	—	—	—	—	—	—
1980–81	Michigan	WCHA	34	18	15	0	1955	128	0	3.93	.891	—	—	—	—	—	—	—	—
1981–82	Oklahoma City Stars	CHL	44	12	28	0	2363	187	0	4.75	.876	2	—	—	—	—	—	—	—
1981–82	Binghamton Whalers	AHL	2	0	0	0	80	7	0	5.25	—	—	—	—	—	—	—	—	—
1982–83	Binghamton Whalers	AHL	39	13	18	3	2127	130	1	3.67	.885	2	—	—	—	—	—	—	—
1983–84	Binghamton Whalers	AHL	30	10	17	2	1731	149	3	5.16	.854	—	—	—	—	—	—	—	—
1984–85	Salt Lake Golden Eagles	IHL	4	—	—	—	—	—	—	—	—	—	—	—	—	—	—	—	—
NCAA totals			69	38	27	2	3987	276	0	4.15	.887	—	—	—	—	—	—	—	—
AHL totals			71	23	35	5	3938	286	4	4.36	—	—	—	—	—	—	—	—	—

== Head coaching record ==
Team	Year	Regular season					
Team	Year	G	W	L	T	Pts	Finish
Delta Flyers	1986–87	52	29	23	0	58	3rd in Coastal Conference

== Awards and honors ==
Award	Year
All-WCHA Second Team	1980–81
AHCA West All-American	1980–81
