= 1964 NCAA men's ice hockey tournament =

College ice hockey tournament

- Teams: 4
- Finals site: University of Denver Arena, Denver, Colorado
- Champions: Michigan Wolverines (7th title)
- Runner-up: Denver Pioneers (5th title game)
- Semifinalists: Rensselaer Engineers (4th Frozen Four); Providence Friars (1st Frozen Four)
- Winning coach: Al Renfrew (1st title)
- MOP: Bob Gray (Michigan)
- Attendance: 16,278

The 1964 NCAA Men's Ice Hockey Tournament was the culmination of the 1963–64 NCAA men's ice hockey season, the 17th such tournament in NCAA history. It was held between March 19 and 21, 1964, and concluded with Michigan defeating Denver 6–3. All games were played at the University of Denver Arena in Denver, Colorado.

== Qualifying teams ==
Four teams qualified for the tournament, two each from the eastern and western regions. The ECAC tournament champion and the WCHA tournament champion received automatic bids into the tournament. Two at-large bids were offered to one eastern and one western team based upon both their tournament finish as well as their regular season record.

| East | | | | | | | West | | | | | | |
| Seed | School | Conference | Record | Berth type | Appearance | Last bid | Seed | School | Conference | Record | Berth type | Appearance | Last bid |
|---|---|---|---|---|---|---|---|---|---|---|---|---|---|
| 1 | Providence | ECAC Hockey | 19–5–0 | Tournament champion | 1st | Never | 1 | Denver | WCHA | 19–6–4 | Tournament champion | 5th | 1963 |
| 2 | Rensselaer | ECAC Hockey | 17–7–0 | At-Large | 4th | 1961 | 2 | Michigan | WCHA | 22–4–1 | At-Large | 12th | 1962 |

== Format ==
The ECAC champion was seeded as the top eastern team while the WCHA champion was given the top western seed. The second eastern seed was slotted to play the top western seed and vice versa. All games were played at the Meehan Auditorium. All matches were Single-game eliminations with the semifinal winners advancing to the national championship game and the losers playing in a consolation game.

== Bracket ==
Semifinals; March 19–20
W1 | Denver | 4
E2 | Rensselaer | 1
E1 | Providence | 2
W2 | Michigan | 3

National Championship; March 21
W1 | Denver | 3
W2 | Michigan | 6
Third Place Game
E1 | Providence | 1
E2 | Rensselaer | 2

Note: * denotes overtime period(s)

=== Semifinals ===
==== Denver vs. Rensselaer ====
| March 19 | Denver | 4 – 1 | Rensselaer | University of Denver Arena | Recap |
| No scoring | | First period | No scoring |
| (unassisted) Emory Sampson - 17:10 | | Second period | No scoring |
| (Fragomeni, Staub) Andy Herrebout - GW - 02:09 (Smith, Herrebout) Bill Staub - 06:51 (Livingstone) Emory Sampson - SH - 13:54 | | Third period | 16:37 - Bruce Tisdall (Anderson) |
| (10 saves) Buddy Blom | | Goalie stats | Bill Sack (32 saves) |

==== Providence vs. Michigan ====
| March 20 | Providence | 2 – 3 | Michigan | University of Denver Arena | Recap |
| (Hefernan) Ray Mooney - 06:27 | | First period | 15:01 - Tom Polanic (Wilkie, Cole) |
| (Warburton, Kish) John Heximer - 13:36 | | Second period | No scoring |
| No scoring | | Third period | 12:33 - Ron Coristine (Polonic, Butler); 15:23 - GW - Gary Butler (Wilkie, Cole) |
| (30 saves) Bob Bellemore | | Goalie stats | Bob Gray (22 saves) |

=== Consolation Game ===
==== Providence vs. Rensselaer ====
| March 21 | Providence | 1 – 2 | Rensselaer | University of Denver Arena | Recap |
| (Mooney) Grant Hefferman - 7:55 | | First period | No scoring |
| No scoring | | Second period | 12:06 - Pete Russel (Jones, Knightley) |
| No scoring | | Third period | 16:01 - GW - Pete Russel (Knightley, Brinkworth) |
| (14 saves) Bob Bellemore | | Goalie stats | Bill Sack (25 saves) |

=== National Championship ===
==== Denver vs. Michigan ====
| March 21 | Denver | 3 – 6 | Michigan | University of Denver Arena |

Scoring summary
| Period | Team | Goal | Assist(s) | Time | Score |
|---|---|---|---|---|---|
| 1st | UM | Wilf Martin | Hood and Polanic | 17:48 | 1–0 UM |
| 2nd | UM | Mel Wakabayashi – PP | Ferguson and Wilkie | 22:19 | 2–0 UM |
| 2nd | UM | Jack Cole | Wilkie | 23:22 | 3–0 UM |
| 2nd | DEN | Bill Staub – PP | Herrebout and Lindsay | 25:34 | 3–1 UM |
| 2nd | DEN | Ron Livingstone | Sampson and Naslund | 37:24 | 3–2 UM |
| 3rd | UM | Jack Cole – GW | Polanic and Wilkie | 44:08 | 4–2 UM |
| 3rd | DEN | Wayne Smith – PP | Herrebout | 49:54 | 4–3 UM |
| 3rd | UM | Mel Wakabayashi | Coristine and Ferguson | 56:49 | 5–3 UM |
| 3rd | UM | Alex Hood | Polanic and Martin | 58:24 | 6–3 UM |
Penalty summary
| Period | Team | Player | Penalty | Time | PIM |
| 1st | UM | Ron Coristine | Interference | 1:46 | 2:00 |
| 1st | UM | Roger Galipeau | Slashing | 2:28 | 2:00 |
| 1st | DEN | Dave Paderski | Holding | 7:12 | 2:00 |
| 1st | UM | Barry MacDonald | Tripping | 11:32 | 2:00 |
| 1st | UM | Ted Henderson | Interference | 18:20 | 2:00 |
| 2nd | DEN | Emory Sampson | Charging | 20:32 | 2:00 |
| 2nd | UM | Bob Ferguson | Hooking | 24:08 | 2:00 |
| 2nd | DEN | Myles Gillard | Roughing | 26:55 | 2:00 |
| 2nd | UM | Tom Polonic | Roughing | 26:55 | 2:00 |
| 2nd | DEN | Wayne Smith | Interference | 39:27 | 2:00 |
| 3rd | UM | Tom Polonic | Misconduct | 44:08 | 10:00 |
| 3rd | UM | Bob Ferguson | Hooking | 49:30 | 2:00 |
| 3rd | UM | Roger Galipeau | Roughing | 52:19 | 2:00 |
| 3rd | DEN | Bill Staub | Roughing | 52:19 | 2:00 |
| 3rd | UM | Barry MacDonald | Cross-checking | 52:32 | 2:00 |
| 3rd | UM | Roger Galipeau | Interference | 59:16 | 2:00 |

Shots by period
| Team | 1 | 2 | 3 | T |
|---|---|---|---|---|
| Michigan | 7 | 6 | 16 | 29 |
| Denver | 15 | 10 | 9 | 34 |

Goaltenders
| Team | Name | Saves | Goals against | Time on ice |
|---|---|---|---|---|
| UM | Bob Gray | 31 | 3 | |
| DEN | Buddy Blom | 23 | 6 | |

== All-Tournament Team ==
=== First Team ===
- G: Bob Gray* (Michigan)
- D: Tom Polanic (Michigan)
- D: Wayne Smith (Denver)
- F: Andy Herrebout (Denver)
- F: Bill Staub (Denver)
- F: Gordon Wilkie (Michigan)

* Most Outstanding Player(s)

=== Second Team ===
- G: Bob Bellemore (Providence)
- D: Jim Kenning (Denver)
- D: Larry Kish (Providence)
- D: Barry MacDonald (Michigan)
- F: Mel Wakabayashi (Michigan)
- F: Jerry Knightley (Rensselaer)
- F: Jack Cole (Michigan)
