= Bob Gray (ice hockey) =

Canadian ice hockey player

- Born: 1940 (age 85–86) Owen Sound, Ontario, Canada
- Height: 6 ft 0 in (183 cm)
- Weight: 210 lb (95 kg; 15 st 0 lb)
- Position: Goaltender
- Played for: Michigan; Fort Wayne Komets; Seattle Totems; San Francisco Seals
- NHL draft: Undrafted
- Playing career: 1961–1972

Robert Gray is a Canadian retired ice hockey goaltender who was the Most Outstanding Player of the 1964 NCAA Tournament.

== Career ==
Gray was a three-year starter for Michigan, beginning his career in 1961. On a team led by Red Berenson, Gray split time with Dave Butts and helped Michigan to a second-place finish in the WCHA, earning a spot on the All-WCHA Second Team. The Wolverines also finished as runner-up in the conference Tournament and received the second western seed for the NCAA Tournament. Michigan was stunned by a 4–5 loss to Clarkson in the semifinal and finished the tournament in third place.

After Berenson's graduation the team declined sharply, ending up in last place the following year with a record of 7–14–3. During the year Gray again split time in goal, this time sharing the net with William Bieber. Because Gray's numbers had been far superior to Bieber's, the veteran was tasked with carrying the lion's share of starts during his senior season. Gray answered the bell and the Michigan offense had a miraculous recovery, scoring almost twice as many goals per game as they had the year before. Michigan finished atop the WCHA and, during the team's 12-game winning streak, Gray had a game for the ages; in a 21–0 rout of Ohio State, who were in their first year of varsity play, Gray was playing as a forward and recorded a hat-trick.

In the conference tournament Michigan was nearly knocked out by Michigan Tech in the semifinal and were soundly beaten by Denver in the championship. The poor performances did not bode well for the Wolverines as they entered the 1964 NCAA Tournament. They faced ECAC Champion Providence in the semifinals and were obviously the better team, despite winning by just a single goal. They faced Denver for the championship and got off to a great start, scoring the first three goals of the game while Gray stopped 15 shots in the first period alone. Denver came close to tying the game twice but a 3-goal third period from the Maize and Blue put the game out of reach and Michigan won the national championship. Gray was named the Tournament Most Outstanding Player.

After graduating, Gray played two years of professional hockey, serving as the backup goalie for the Fort Wayne Komets when the team won the 1965 Turner Cup. His last recorded appearance was for the Reno Aces in 1972. He was inducted into the Michigan Dekers Hall of Fame in 1990.

== Statistics ==
=== Regular season and playoffs ===
			Regular season									Playoffs
Season	Team	League	GP	W	L	T	MIN	GA	SO	GAA	SV%	GP	W	L	MIN	GA	SO	GAA	SV%
1961–62	Michigan	WCHA	—	—	—	—	—	42	0	—	.905	—	—	—	—	—	—	—	—
1962–63	Michigan	WCHA	—	—	—	—	—	44	0	—	.902	—	—	—	—	—	—	—	—
1963–64	Michigan	WCHA	24	—	—	—	1444	65	4	2.70	.914	—	—	—	—	—	—	—	—
1964–65	Seattle Totems	WHL	5	—	—	—	—	—	—	2.80	—	—	—	—	—	—	—	—	—
1964–65	Fort Wayne Komets	IHL	9	—	—	—	—	24	1	2.67	.898	—	—	—	—	—	—	—	—
1965–66	San Francisco Seals	WHL	—	—	—	—	—	—	—	—	—	—	—	—	—	—	—	—	—
1965–66	Fort Wayne Komets	IHL	29	—	—	—	—	115	1	3.92	—	—	—	—	—	—	—	—	—
1971–72	Reno Aces	Independent	—	—	—	—	—	—	—	—	—	—	—	—	—	—	—	—	—

== Awards and honors ==
Award	Year
All-WCHA Second Team	1961–62
NCAA All-Tournament First Team	1964

Awards and achievements
Preceded by Al McLean	NCAA Tournament Most Outstanding Player; 1964	Succeeded by Gary Milroy
