= Bob Bellemore =

American ice hockey coach

Bob Bellemore (born October 26, 1940) is a known presence in Rhode Island's ice hockey and baseball communities. He is a former standout goaltender and baseball player for Providence College in the National Collegiate Athletic Association. He has also served as the goaltending coach for the National Hockey League's New Jersey Devils.

== Early life and education ==
Bellemore was born in Smithfield, Rhode Island, where he graduated from La Salle Academy in 1959. He later attended Providence College.

In 1964 Bellemore, then a sophomore, led the Providence College ice hockey team to its first-ever ECAC Hockey championship and first-ever birth into the NCAA final four. He also starred on the diamond. Appropriately a catcher and third baseman, he played for four years at Providence College and served as a captain his senior year. A 1984 inductee into Providence College's Athletic Hall of Fame, he is regarded as one of the greatest athletes in the history of Providence College.

== Coaching career ==
Bellemore's coaching career officially began in 1968, when he was named an assistant coach for the Providence College men's ice hockey team. He had been a part-time volunteer assistant for the program previously. He remained an assistant for Providence College until 1986 when he briefly took the title of Schneider Arena Director. In 1987, he left Providence College to serve as the goaltending coach for the New Jersey Devils, a position he held until 1991 when he returned to Providence College to pursue a master's degree in special education. He also re-joined the Providence College hockey coaching staff upon his return, this time as the women's goaltending coach, a post he still holds today. In addition to coaching at Providence College, he helps lead the goaltending segment of USA Hockey Elite training camps in Lake Placid, New York. He also occasionally provides color commentary for the PC men when they are televised on Cox Sports Television.

After earning his master's degree Bellemore began serving as a special education instructor at South Kingstown High School. He is currently employed as a guidance counselor at South Kingstown High School. In addition to his coaching and career in education, he is also a baseball umpire in Rhode Island, covering games for the Rhode Island Interscholastic League, the Rhode Island Independent Amateur Baseball League, and other local leagues.

== Personal life ==
Originally a native of Smithfield, Rhode Island, Bellemore now resides in Westerly, Rhode Island with his wife Marguerite. His son Bruce, a 1991 Providence College graduate, was also an ice hockey player for the Friars. Bellemore and his wife are the grandparents of eleven.

== See also ==
- List of New Jersey Devils head coaches

== Awards and honors ==
Award	Year
NCAA All-Tournament Second Team	1964
Inducted into the Rhode Island Hockey Hall of Fame	2022
