= John Giordano (ice hockey coach) =

American ice hockey coach

Biographical details
- Born: 1944 (age 81–82)
- Education: Wayne State University

Coaching career (HC unless noted)
- 1969–1979: Harper Woods Notre Dame High School
- 1979–1980: Michigan (assistant)
- 1980–1984: Michigan

Head coaching record
- Overall: 68–75–6 (.477)

John Giordano (born c. 1944) is a former ice hockey coach. He was the head coach of the Michigan Wolverines men's ice hockey team from 1980 to 1984.

== Early years ==
Giordano attended Notre Dame High School, a Catholic high school located in the Detroit suburb of Harper Woods, Michigan. He graduated in 1961 and later graduated from Wayne State University in Detroit.

== Hockey coach at Harper Woods Notre Dame ==
Giordano returned to Harper Woods Notre Dame High School as a teacher and hockey coach. He was the hockey coach at Notre Dame from 1969 to 1979. He led the Notre Dame hockey team to a Michigan state championship in 1972. While at Notre Dame, he coached future NHL player John Blum. Actor Dave Coulier also played hockey for Giordano in the 1970s. Coulier later recalled: "Giordano wasn't real happy when I made the guys laugh. He was very serious. Not a great combination with my constantly goofing-around personality. We had team curfews, haircuts, and if you didn't wear a suit to the games, you were benched."

== Hockey coach at Michigan ==
In 1979, Giordano was hired as an assistant hockey coach at the University of Michigan working under head coach Dan Farrell. Giordano was reunited at Michigan with John Blum, who had joined the Wolverines after graduating from Notre Dame High School. During the 1979-1980 hockey season, Giordano was in charge of the Wolverines' power play. Giordano was credited with molding the unit into "the most potent power play in the country," scoring on 40% of power play opportunities.

In the spring of 1980, Farrell resigned as Michigan's head coach and was replaced by former Wolverine hockey star Wilf Martin. In the fall of 1980, the Michigan hockey team became embroiled in two major controversies.

First, a hazing scandal dominated press coverage of the team in October. Veteran players reportedly forced a freshman player to drink large quantities of gin, vodka and beer, stripped him of his clothes, shaved his body from the neck down, covered him with jam, eggs and cologne, dumped him in the trunk of a car, and left him nearly unconscious in freezing weather. This was later found not to be true and the players actually returned the player, (J T Todd) to his dorm. Todd, who was walk-on from Detroit left the team.

Second, head coach Martin developed health problems, reported in the press to be an emotional disorder, during the exhibition season. Martin coached only two games during the 1980-1981 season, and announced his resignation in late November 1980.

Giordano took over, initially as interim head coach, for a Michigan hockey team in crisis. Giordano was praised for his efforts in leading the team to a 23-17 record during the 1980-1981 season. The Michigan Daily noted:

"The Wayne State graduate was faced with a very adverse set of circumstances from the outset, including the loss of Michigan's top three scorers, being picked to finish last in the WCHA by pre-season pollsters, and extremely negative publicity surrounding the hazing incident."

Athletic director Don Canham added, "He took over in a bad situation and he's done a remarkably good job." Giordano was named permanent head coach in early February 1981. At the end of the 1980-1981 season, he was named collegiate Coach of the Year by The Hockey News, WCHA Coach of the Year by The Denver Post, and WCHA Co-Coach of the Year with John MacInnes by the vote of WCHA coaches.

In Giordano's second year as head coach, the Michigan hockey team moved from the highly competitive Western Collegiate Hockey Association ("WCHA") to the less-competitive Central Collegiate Hockey Association ("CCHA"). With the change in conferences, "the conventional wisdom was that the Wolverines would dominate the new circuit behind their successful young coach." Instead, the Wolverines finished in fourth place in the CCHA during the 1981-1982 season with a record of 18-15-5.; The team continued to move in the wrong direction in Giordano's third and fourth years as head coach, finishing in ninth place in the CCHA both years with records of 14-22-0 and 14-22-1.

Giordano's position as head coach was further undermined by lagging attendance (Michigan averaged approximately 3,000 fans per game during Giordano's final two years as head coach) and a players' mutiny. Giordano had a reputation as a disciplinarian. Among other things, he strictly enforced curfews and ordered extra 6 a.m. practices when the team failed to perform. He was also alleged to have stripped seven players of their scholarships. In the spring of 1984, all 22 Michigan hockey players signed a petition listing their grievances and stating that Giordano was "an embarrassment to all of us in front of other coaches and players." Athletic director Don Canham later recalled:

"I never talk to players about their coaches. I coached myself, and I know enough not to do that. But when all 22 players walked into my office the second time with a signed petition to say this situation is intolerable – well, I just had to let him go. He just never could get along with the players."

In his history of the Michigan hockey program, historian John U. Bacon noted: "In reporting the decision, the Michigan Daily described Giordano as being 'very unpopular with the players, parents, fans and alumni' – which didn't leave many in his corner."

Giordano was replaced as the head coach of the Michigan men's ice hockey team by Red Berenson, who retired from the position in 2017 after 33 seasons.

== Head coaching record ==
=== College ===
Record table
| Season | Team | Overall | Conference | Standing | Postseason |
|---|---|---|---|---|---|
Michigan Wolverines (WCHA / Big Ten †) (1980–1981)
| 1980–81 | Michigan | 22–16–0‡ | 15–13–0 / 4–8–0‡ | t-5th / 3rd | WCHA Second Round |
| Michigan: | | 22–16–0 | 15–13–0 / 4–8–0 | | |
Michigan Wolverines (CCHA) (1981–1984)
| 1981–82 | Michigan | 18–15–5 | 14–12–4 | t-4th | CCHA First Round |
| 1982–83 | Michigan | 14–22–0 | 11–21–0 | t-9th | |
| 1983–84 | Michigan | 14–22–1 | 11–18–1 | 9th | |
| Michigan: | | 46–59–6 | 36–51–5 | | |
| Total: | | 68–75–6 | | | |
National champion Postseason invitational champion Conference regular season champion Conference regular season and conference tournament champion Division regular season champion Division regular season and conference tournament champion Conference tournament champion

†Michigan played jointly in the Big Ten and WCHA from 1959 to 1981
‡Giordano became coach 2 games into the season when Wilf Martin resigned

Awards and achievements
| Preceded by Brad Buetow | WCHA Coach of the Year; 1980–81 | Succeeded by John Gasparini |
