= Gordon Wilkie =

Canadian ice hockey player (born 1940)

- Wilkie from 1965 Michiganensian
- Born: May 3, 1940 (age 84); Regina, Saskatchewan, Canada
- Height: 6.01 ft 0 in (183 cm)
- Weight: 180 lb (82 kg; 12 st 12 lb)
- Position: Center
- Played for: Regina Pats; Cleveland Barons; San Diego Gulls; Seattle Totems
- Playing career: 1961–1974

Gordon Wilkie (born May 3, 1940) is a Canadian ice hockey player (center) who played three seasons for the University of Michigan from 1961 to 1964. As a senior and team captain in 1964, Wilkie led the Michigan Wolverines men's ice hockey team to the NCAA ice hockey championship. Wilkie also played two seasons of junior hockey with the Regina Pats, and five years of professional hockey with the Cleveland Barons, San Diego Gulls and Seattle Totems. He was inducted into the University of Michigan Athletic Hall of Honor in 1989.

== University of Michigan ==
A native of Regina, Saskatchewan, Wilkie played two seasons of junior hockey with the Regina Pats from 1957 to 1959. In 1960, Coach Al Renfrew recruited Wilkie and other players from Regina to play for him at the University of Michigan. Wilkie later recalled, "My dad ran a meat market in Regina. He simply couldn't afford to send me here. Michigan hockey was my chance at an education. I spent a lot of Saturday nights in the library." He added, "I owe Red (Berenson) and Coach (Al) Renfrew for the opportunity to be part of this great tradition.

Freshmen were not eligible to play varsity hockey at the time, and Wilkie began his collegiate hockey career as a sophomore in the 1961-1962 season. He received the Western Collegiate Hockey Association Rookie of the Year Award. As a junior in the 1962-63 season, Wilkie scored 34 points on 24 goals and 10 assists. At the end of the season, in March 1963, Wilkie was elected by his teammates to be the captain of the 1963-64 team.

Wilkie had his greatest success as a senior in the 1963-1964 season, as he led the Michigan Wolverines to their seventh NCAA hockey championship, and their first in ten years. Wilkie was also named a first-team All-American at center. The 1964 team had a record of 24-4-1 and defeated the University of Denver 6-3 in their home arena to win the NCAA title. Wilkie later recalled, "Winning the NCAA, with 7,000 fans packing their home ice -- man, that was the greatest."

Wilkie credited the success of the 1964 team to chemistry: "We had 20 guys who fit together as a team. Any night any line could take it, not just a few guys. And we had six good defensemen. We got along as well on the ice as off it, and that's big in college hockey. The Regina guys used to joke with the Toronto guys who produced the best players, but we had good harmony, even with the American kids." Wilkie and Gary Butler were Michigan's leading scorers, combining for a 135 points in just 29 games. In one memorable game in the 1963–1964 season, Michigan beat Ohio State 21–0, still a Michigan team record. The team scored all 21 goals in the first two periods, and Wilkie recalled Coach Renfrew telling the team after the second period, "Anyone who scores this period is benched."

Wilkie graduated from Michigan's business school with a 3.5 grade point average, and received an award for being the top student-athlete on campus.

== Professional hockey ==
Wilkie signed with the Montreal Canadiens and was assigned to the Cleveland Barons of the American Hockey League. He scored 42 points (16 goals and 26 assists) in the 1964–1965 season. He was briefly loaned out to the Seattle Totems of the Western Hockey League, playing three games for the Totems. In October 1965, Wilkie was reacquired by the Cleveland Barons for whom he played 42 games in the 1965–1966 season. In April 1966, Wilkie scored the winning goal for Cleveland in the semi-finals of the Calder Cup Playoffs in the AHL.

Wilkie returned to the WHL in 1966, playing for 111 games and scoring 42 points for the San Diego Gulls in the first two seasons of professional hockey in San Diego, from 1966 to 1968.

== Later years ==
In 1989, Wilkie was inducted into the University of Michigan Athletic Hall of Honor. In 2003, the members of the 1964 NCAA championship team returned to Yost Arena for a 40th-anniversary reunion. The 1964 team was brought onto the ice during the first intermission of a Michigan hockey game, and was given a standing ovation, as the hockey pep band played "The Victors." Wilkie told a reporter for the Michigan Daily that watching the action brought back "fond memories." He added, "It's a great thrill to be back. Michigan was really good to us, and we had a good time when we were down (playing) here."

== Awards and honours ==
Award	Year
All-WCHA Second Team	1961–62
All-WCHA First Team	1963–64
AHCA West All-American	1963–64
All-NCAA All-Tournament First Team	1964

== See also ==
- University of Michigan Athletic Hall of Honor

Awards and achievements
Preceded by Jack Wilson	WCHA Sophomore of the Year; 1961–62	Succeeded by George Hill
