= 2017–18 Michigan Wolverines men's ice hockey season =

Sports season

NCAA Tournament, Frozen Four
- Conference: 3rd Big Ten
- Home ice: Yost Ice Arena

Rankings
- USCHO: #10
- USA Today: #10

Record
- Overall: 22–15–3 (11–10–3)
- Home: 13–5–1
- Road: 5–8–2
- Neutral: 4–2–0

Coaches and captains
- Head coach: Mel Pearson
- Captain: Tony Calderone
- Alternate captain(s): Sam Piazza, Joseph Cecconi, Griffin Luce, Jake Slaker

The 2017–18 Michigan Wolverines men's hockey team was the Wolverines' 96th season. They represented the University of Michigan in the 2017–18 NCAA Division I men's ice hockey season. The team was coached by Mel Pearson, in his first year as head coach, and played their home games at Yost Ice Arena. This season was the beginning of a new era, as long time head coach Red Berenson retired after 33 years of service as coach at Michigan. Michigan advanced to the Frozen Four for the first time since 2011, but lost to Notre Dame in the national semifinals after captain Jake Evans scored the game-winning goal with six seconds remaining.

When the team reached the Frozen Four it marked the sixth time a school had reached the final four of the NCAA Men's Ice Hockey Championship and NCAA Division I men's basketball tournament in the same season: Michigan (1964, 1992*, 1993* and 2018) and Michigan State (1999 and 2001).

== Previous season ==
During the 2016–17 ice hockey season Michigan went 13–19–3, including 6–12–2 in Big Ten Play. Michigan lost in the first round of the 2017 Big Ten men's ice hockey tournament to eventual tournament winner Penn State by a score of 4 to 1. Michigan missed out on the NCAA Hockey Tournament. At the end of the season head coach Red Berenson retired after 33 years of service as head coach of the Michigan Wolverines.

== Roster ==
As of February 2, 2018

F

No.	Nat.	Player	Class	Pos	Height	Weight	DoB	Hometown	Previous team	NHL rights
2		Luke Martin	Sophomore	D	6' 3" (1.91 m)	215 lb (98 kg)	1998-09-20	St. Louis, Missouri	USNTDP (USHL)	CAR, 52nd overall 2017
4		Cutler Martin	Senior	D	6' 0" (1.83 m)	220 lb (100 kg)	1994-07-20	East Lansing, Michigan	Tri-City (USHL)	—
5		Griffin Luce	Sophomore	D	6' 3" (1.91 m)	214 lb (97 kg)	1998-03-10	Williamsville, New York	USNTDP (USHL)	—
6		Sam Piazza	Senior	D	6' 0" (1.83 m)	196 lb (89 kg)	1994-01-27	Darien, Illinois	Wichita Falls Wildcats (NAHL)	—
8		Jack Becker	Freshman	F	6' 3" (1.91 m)	205 lb (93 kg)	1997-06-24	Dellwood, Minnesota	Sioux Falls Stampede (USHL)	BOS, 195th overall 2015
9		Josh Norris	Freshman	F	6' 1" (1.85 m)	195 lb (88 kg)	1999-05-05	Oxford, Michigan	USNTDP (USHL)	SJS, 19th overall 2017
10		Will Lockwood	Sophomore	F	5' 11" (1.8 m)	172 lb (78 kg)	1998-06-20	Bloomfield Hills, Michigan	USNTDP (USHL)	VAN, 64th overall 2016
11		Brendan Warren	Junior	F	6' 1" (1.85 m)	195 lb (88 kg)	1997-05-07	Carleton, Michigan	USNTDP (USHL)	ARI, 81st overall 2015
12		Dakota Raabe	Freshman	F	5' 9" (1.75 m)	170 lb (77 kg)	1997-05-06	Capistrano Beach, California	Wenatchee Wild (BCHL)	—
13		Jake Slaker	Sophomore	F	5' 10" (1.78 m)	184 lb (83 kg)	1996-06-28	San Diego, California	Bloomington Thunder (USHL)	—
17		Tony Calderone	Senior	F	6' 0" (1.83 m)	200 lb (91 kg)	1994-10-15	Trenton, Michigan	Sioux Falls Stampede (USHL)	—
18		Adam Winborg	Sophomore	F	6' 2" (1.88 m)	205 lb (93 kg)	1995-03-31	Stockholm, Sweden	Janesville Jets (NAHL)	—
20		Cooper Marody	Junior	F	6' 0" (1.83 m)	190 lb (86 kg)	1996-12-20	Brighton, Michigan	Sioux Falls Stampede (USHL)	PHI, 158th overall 2015
21		Michael Pastujov	Freshman	F	6' 0" (1.83 m)	190 lb (86 kg)	1999-08-23	Bradenton, Florida	USNTDP (USHL)	—
22		Niko Porikos	Senior	F/D	6' 3" (1.91 m)	200 lb (91 kg)	1993-05-04	Ann Arbor, Michigan	Hamilton Red Wings (OJHL)	—
25		Luke Morgan	Sophomore	F	5' 11" (1.8 m)	190 lb (86 kg)	1997-08-28	Brighton, Michigan	Cedar Rapids RoughRiders (USHL)	—
28		Alex Roos		F	5' 9" (1.75 m)	175 lb (79 kg)	1994-12-05	Prairie Grove, Illinois	Chicago Steel (USHL)	—
30		Hayden Lavigne	Sophomore	G	6' 3" (1.91 m)	200 lb (91 kg)	1996-04-07	Brampton, Ontario	Bloomington Thunder (USHL)	—
31		Chad Catt	Junior	G	5' 10" (1.78 m)	190 lb (86 kg)	1994-03-28	Williamston, Michigan	Soo Eagles (NAHL)	—
33		Joseph Cecconi	Junior	D	6' 2" (1.88 m)	205 lb (93 kg)	1997-05-23	Youngstown, New York	Muskegon Lumberjacks (USHL)	DAL, 133rd overall 2015
43		Quinn Hughes	Freshman	D	5' 10" (1.78 m)	175 lb (79 kg)	1999-10-14	Orlando, Florida	USNTDP (USHL)	VAN, 7th overall 2018
45		Jack LaFontaine	Sophomore	G	6' 3" (1.91 m)	197 lb (89 kg)	1998-01-05	Mississauga, Ontario	Janesville Jets (NAHL)	CAR, 75th overall 2016
47		Christian Meike	Sophomore	D	6' 0" (1.83 m)	172 lb (78 kg)	1996-01-23	Arlington, Virginia	Waterloo Black Hawks (USHL)	—
61		James Sanchez	Sophomore	F	6' 2" (1.88 m)	195 lb (88 kg)	1998-02-25	Northbrook, Illinois	USNTDP (USHL)	—
74		Nicholas Boka	Junior	D	6' 1" (1.85 m)	200 lb (91 kg)	1997-09-08	Plymouth, Michigan	USNTDP (USHL)	MIN, 171st overall 2015
90		Dexter Dancs	Senior	F	6' 2" (1.88 m)	205 lb (93 kg)	1995-02-01	North Vancouver, British Columbia	Vernon Vipers (BCHL)	—
91		Nick Pastujov	Sophomore	F	6' 0" (1.83 m)	200 lb (91 kg)	1998-01-21	Bradenton, Florida	USNTDP (USHL)	NYI, 193rd overall 2016

== Coaching staff ==
Name	Position	Seasons at Michigan	Alma mater
Mel Pearson	Head Coach	1st	Michigan Tech (1981)
Bill Muckalt	Associate Head Coach	1st	Michigan (1998)
Brian Wiseman	Assistant coach	7th	Michigan (1994)
Steve Shields	Volunteer Assistant Coach	2nd	Michigan (1994)
Jeff Tambellini	Undergraduate Assistant Coach	1st	Michigan (2005)

== Standings ==
2017–18 Big Ten ice hockey standings
	Conference record								Overall record					
	GP	W	L	T	SOW	PTS	GF	GA	GP	W	L	T	GF	GA
#2 Notre Dame†*	24	17	6	1	1	53	66	47	40	28	10	2	117	87
#3 Ohio State	24	14	8	2	1	45	77	55	41	26	10	5	131	85
#4 Michigan	24	11	10	3	2	38	70	72	40	22	15	3	136	121
#13 Penn State	24	9	10	5	2	34	70	72	38	18	15	5	138	120
#18 Minnesota	24	10	12	2	1	33	65	69	38	19	17	2	102	100
Wisconsin	24	8	13	3	1	28	69	83	37	14	19	4	115	124
Michigan State	24	6	16	2	1	21	53	77	36	12	22	2	91	117
Championship: March 17, 2018 † indicates conference regular season champion * indicates conference tournament champion Rankings: USCHO.com Top 20 Poll; updated March 12, 2018

== Schedule and results ==
Date	Time	Opponent^{#}	Rank^{#}	Site	Result	Attendance	Record
Exhibition
September 30	7:00 PM	Western Ontario*		Yost Ice Arena • Ann Arbor, MI	W 10–1	5,112	–
Regular season
October 6	7.00 PM	at St. Lawrence*		Appleton Arena • Canton, NY	W 3–1	2,176	1–0
October 7	7:00 PM	at Clarkson*		Cheel Arena • Potsdam, NY	L 0–3	2,688	1–1
October 20	7:30 PM	Vermont*		Yost Ice Arena • Ann Arbor, MI	W 4–1	5,206	2–1
October 21	5:00 PM	Vermont*		Yost Ice Arena • Ann Arbor, MI	W 3–2	4,988	3–1
October 27	7:00 PM	at #15 Penn State		Pegula Ice Arena • State College, PA	L 4–5 ^{OT}	6,096	3–2 (0–1)
October 28	8:00 PM	at #15 Penn State		Pegula Ice Arena • State College, PA	W 5–2	6,011	4–2 (1–1)
November 2	7:30 PM	Ferris State*		Yost Ice Arena • Ann Arbor, MI	W 7–2	5,017	5–2 (1–1)
November 3	7:30 PM	Ferris State*		Yost Ice Arena • Ann Arbor, MI	L 2–3 ^{OT}	5,800	5–3 (1–1)
November 10	7:30 PM	#4 Minnesota		Yost Ice Arena • Ann Arbor, MI (Rivalry)	W 5–4 ^{OT}	5,358	6–3 (2–1)
November 11	7:30 PM	#4 Minnesota		Yost Ice Arena • Ann Arbor, MI (Rivalry)	T 6–6 ^{(SO, L)}	5,561	6–3–1 (2–1–1)
November 17	8:00 PM	at #9 Wisconsin		Kohl Center • Madison, WI	L 3–7	9,461	6–4–1 (2–2–1)
November 18	8:00 PM	at #9 Wisconsin		Kohl Center • Madison, WI	T 4–4 ^{(SO, W)}	10,922	6–4–2 (2–2–2)
November 24	6:30 PM	#15 Ohio State		Yost Ice Arena • Ann Arbor, MI (Rivalry)	L 2–3	5,800	6–5–2 (2–3–2)
November 25	7:30 PM	#15 Ohio State		Yost Ice Arena • Ann Arbor, MI (Rivalry)	L 1–5	5,626	6–6–2 (2–4–2)
December 2	7:00 PM	vs. U.S. NTDP U-18 Team*		Compuware Arena • Plymouth, MI	W 7–3	–	–
December 7	7:30 PM	Michigan State		Yost Ice Arena • Ann Arbor, MI (Rivalry)	W 4–0	5,417	7–6–2 (3–4–2)
December 8	7:05 PM	at Michigan State		Munn Ice Arena • East Lansing, MI	L 0–5	6,007	7–7–2 (3–5–2)
January 1	6:00 PM	vs. Bowling Green*		Little Caesars Arena • Detroit, MI (Great Lakes Invitational)	L 4–6	14,127	7–8–2 (3–5–2)
January 2	2:30 PM	vs. Michigan State*		Little Caesars Arena • Detroit, MI (Great Lakes Invitational)	W 6–4	10,100	8–8–2 (3–5–2)
January 5	6:30 PM	#2 Notre Dame		Yost Ice Arena • Ann Arbor, MI (Rivalry)	L 1–2	5,800	8–9–2 (3–6–2)
January 7	3:05 PM	at #2 Notre Dame		Compton Family Ice Arena • Notre Dame, IN (Rivalry)	L 1–2	4,896	8–10–2 (3–7–2)
January 12	8:00 PM	at #9 Minnesota		Mariucci Arena • Minneapolis, MN (Rivalry)	W 5–3	9,000	9–10–2 (4–7–2)
January 13	8:00 PM	at #9 Minnesota		Mariucci Arena • Minneapolis, MN (Rivalry)	W 3–1	9,908	10–10–2 (5–7–2)
January 19	8:00 PM	#12 Penn State	#20	Yost Ice Arena • Ann Arbor, MI	W 4–0	5,574	11–10–2 (6–7–2)
January 20	7:30 PM	#12 Penn State	#20	Yost Ice Arena • Ann Arbor, MI	W 3–2	5,800	12–10–2 (7–7–2)
January 26	7:00 PM	at #6 Ohio State	#17	Value City Arena • Columbus, OH (Rivalry)	L 0–4	9,951	12–11–2 (7–8–2)
January 27	8:00 PM	at #6 Ohio State	#17	Value City Arena • Columbus, OH (Rivalry)	L 3–5	8,830	12–12–2 (7–9–2)
February 2	7:30 PM	#18 Wisconsin	#20	Yost Ice Arena • Ann Arbor, MI	W 5–3	5,800	13–12–2 (8–9–2)
February 3	7:30 PM	#18 Wisconsin	#20	Yost Ice Arena • Ann Arbor, MI	L 2–4	5,800	13–13–2 (8–10–2)
February 9	7:05 PM	at Michigan State	#20	Munn Ice Arena • East Lansing, MI	T 1–1 ^{(SO, W)}	5,917	13–13–3 (8–10–3)
February 10	7:00 PM	vs. Michigan State	#20	Little Caesars Arena • Detroit, MI (Duel in the D)	W 3–2	19,515	14–13–3 (9–10–3)
February 16	7:35 PM	at #1 Notre Dame	#18	Compton Family Ice Arena • Notre Dame, IN (Rivalry)	W 4–2	5,593	15–13–3 (10–10–3)
February 18	5:30 PM	#1 Notre Dame	#18	Yost Ice Arena • Ann Arbor, MI (Rivalry)	W 1–0	5,800	16–13–3 (11–10–3)
February 23	7:30 PM	Arizona State*	#13	Yost Ice Arena • Ann Arbor, MI	W 5–3	5,800	17–13–3 (11–10–3)
February 24	7:30 PM	Arizona State*	#13	Yost Ice Arena • Ann Arbor, MI	W 5–3	5,800	18–13–3 (11–10–3)
Big Ten Tournament
March 2	7:30 PM	Wisconsin	#12	Yost Ice Arena • Ann Arbor, MI (Quarterfinals)	W 6–5	3,411	19–13–3
March 3	7:30 PM	Wisconsin	#12	Yost Ice Arena • Ann Arbor, MI (Quarterfinals)	W 7–4	4,217	20–13–3
March 10	7:30 PM	at #6 Ohio State	#11	Value City Arena • Columbus, OH (Semifinals)	L 2–3 ^{OT}	6,527	20–14–3
NCAA Tournament
March 24	4:30 PM	vs. #8 Northeastern*	#10	DCU Center • Worcester, MA (Regional semifinals)	W 3–2	8,441	21–14–3
March 25	4:00 PM	vs. #13 Boston University*	#10	DCU Center • Worcester, MA (Regional finals)	W 6–3	5,499	22–14–3
April 5	9:30 PM	vs. #2 Notre Dame*	#10	Xcel Energy Center • Saint Paul, MN (National semifinals)	L 3–4	18,026	22–15–3
*Non-conference game. ^{#}Rankings from USCHO.com Poll. All times are in Eastern Time. Source:
