= Tom Polanic =

Canadian ice hockey player (1943–2019)

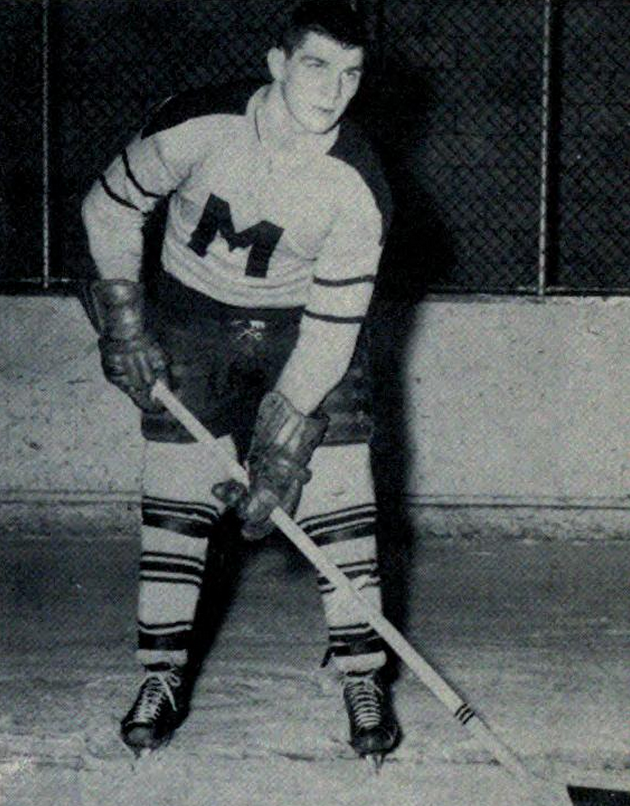
- Polanic at St. Michaels College, c. 1962
- Born: April 2, 1943; Toronto, Ontario, Canada
- Died: September 22, 2019 (aged 76); Toronto, Ontario, Canada
- Height: 6 ft 3 in (191 cm)
- Weight: 210 lb (95 kg; 15 st 0 lb)
- Position: Defence
- Shot: Left
- Played for: Minnesota North Stars
- Playing career: 1965–1977

Thomas Joseph Polanic (April 2, 1943 – September 22, 2019) was a Canadian professional ice hockey player who played 19 games in the National Hockey League for the Minnesota North Stars during the 1969–70 and 1970–71 seasons. The rest of his career, which lasted from 1965 to 1977, was spent in various minor leagues.

== Career statistics ==
=== Regular season and playoffs ===
			Regular season					Playoffs
Season	Team	League	GP	G	A	Pts	PIM	GP	G	A	Pts	PIM
1960–61	St. Michael's Buzzers	MetJBHL	—	—	—	—	—	—	—	—	—	—
1960–61	Toronto St. Michael's Majors	OHA	11	0	0	0	8	1	0	0	0	0
1961–62	Toronto St. Michael's Majors	OHA	23	9	10	19	24	12	0	11	11	23
1961–62	Toronto St. Michael's Majors	M-Cup	—	—	—	—	—	5	0	1	1	25
1962–63	University of Michigan	B1G	—	—	—	—	—	—	—	—	—	—
1963–64	University of Michigan	B1G	—	8	38	46	92	—	—	—	—	—
1964–65	University of Michigan	B1G	—	5	12	17	56	—	—	—	—	—
1965–66	Charlotte Checkers	EHL	64	7	24	31	101	9	1	4	5	23
1965–66	Tulsa Oilers	CHL	2	0	1	1	0	—	—	—	—	—
1966–67	Tulsa Oilers	CHL	19	0	1	1	25	—	—	—	—	—
1966–67	Victoria Maple Leafs	WHL	46	1	13	14	69	—	—	—	—	—
1967–68	Phoenix Roadrunners	WHL	70	3	10	13	136	4	1	0	1	6
1968–69	Phoenix Roadrunners	WHL	74	5	17	22	187	—	—	—	—	—
1969–70	Minnesota North Stars	NHL	16	0	2	2	53	5	1	1	2	4
1969–70	Iowa Stars	CHL	44	1	8	9	88	8	0	1	1	8
1970–71	Minnesota North Stars	NHL	3	0	0	0	0	—	—	—	—	—
1970–71	Cleveland Barons	AHL	68	2	20	22	154	8	0	3	3	35
1971–72	Orillia Terriers	OHA Sr	31	6	24	30	67	—	—	—	—	—
1972–73	Orillia Terriers	OHA Sr	35	4	13	17	87	—	—	—	—	—
1973–74	Orillia Terriers	OHA Sr	33	2	27	29	63	—	—	—	—	—
1974–75	Brantford Foresters	OHA Sr	39	3	18	21	65	—	—	—	—	—
1976–77	Barrie Flyers	OHA Sr	30	1	14	15	31	—	—	—	—	—
WHL totals			190	9	40	49	392	4	1	0	1	6
NHL totals			19	0	2	2	53	5	1	1	2	4

== Awards and honors ==
Award	Year
All-WCHA First Team	1963–64
AHCA West All-American	1963–64
NCAA All-Tournament First Team	1964
All-WCHA Second Team	1964–65

Awards and achievements
Preceded by George Hill	WCHA Sophomore of the Year; 1963–64	Succeeded by Gary Milroy
