= Mel Wakabayashi =

Canadian ice hockey player (1943–2023)

- Born: April 23, 1943 Slocan, British Columbia, Canada
- Died: July 9, 2023 (aged 80) Tokyo, Japan
- Height: 5 ft 6 in (168 cm)
- Weight: 165 lb (75 kg; 11 st 11 lb)
- Position: Centre
- Shot: Right
- Played for: Michigan Wolverines; Memphis Wings; Johnstown Jets; Seibu Tetsudo; Kokudo Keikaku
- Playing career: 1967–1978

Hitoshi "Mel" Wakabayashi (April 23, 1943 – July 9, 2023) was a Canadian-Japanese ice hockey player, a right-handed center, who played for the 1964 NCAA champion Michigan Wolverines hockey team. He was also named Player of the Year in the Western Collegiate Hockey Association in 1966. He went on to play 11 seasons in the Japan Ice Hockey League and to coach the Japan men's national ice hockey team at international competitions, including the 1980 Winter Olympics. After his hockey career ended, Wakabayashi became the President of Seibu Canada. In 2001, Wakabayashi was selected by the WCHA as one of the Top 50 Players in 50-year history of the conference. He was also inducted into the University of Michigan Athletic Hall of Honor in 2006.

== Early life ==
Mel Wakabayashi (Japanese: 若林 仁, romanized: Wakabayashi Hitoshi) was the son of Japanese-born parents who lived in Vancouver, British Columbia. During World War II, his parents were placed in a Japanese-Canadian internment camp at Slocan City, British Columbia, where Mel was born in 1943. Along with thousands of other Japanese-Canadian families, the Wakabayashi family was moved to a second internment camp in Northern Ontario shortly after Mel was born. When Mel's brother Herb was born in December 1944, the family was living in the Neys, Ontario, internment camp on the northern shore of Lake Superior. In 1950, the family moved to Chatham, Ontario, where Mel grew up with his seven siblings. He excelled in both hockey and baseball, playing junior hockey with the Chatham Maroons and baseball for the Ontario Baseball Association championship team. As a youth, Wakabayashi was a teammate of Ferguson Jenkins on the 1956 Ontario champion Chatham Bantams baseball team.

== Hockey career ==
=== Junior Hockey ===
Mel was a star player for the Chatham Maroons. In 1961-62 he scored 33 goals and 33 assists to lead the league in scoring. During the 1962-63 season, he led the league with 64 goals and 102 points over 28 games, despite not playing the entire season, leaving the team in January 1963 to enroll at the University of Michigan.

=== Collegiate ===
University of Michigan hockey coach Al Renfrew visited Chatham to watch Wakabayashi play, and invited him to play hockey for the Wolverines. In January 1963, Wakabayashi enrolled at Michigan, but due to the freshman eligibility rule, Wakabayashi had to wait until January 1964 to play for the hockey team. Wakabayashi made an immediate impact, scoring 21 goals and 17 assists in 1964. He helped the Wolverines win the 1964 NCAA championship and scored two goals in the championship game against the University of Denver. As a junior in 1965, he was the leading scorer for Michigan and in the WCHA. He was awarded the Hall Downes Award as the team's Most Valuable Player and was named a first-team All-American. As a senior in 1966, he was the leading scorer in the WCHA and was named the league's Player of the Year. Because he enrolled in January 1963, he had eligibility for the first semester of 1966-67, where he scored 37 points in the 11 games before his eligibility expired.

Wakabayashi was known for his ability to avoid penalties. In three years of collegiate hockey, he received only one penalty, a tripping call in his sophomore season. He later recalled, "Since I started playing hockey in pee wees, my coaches really banged it into my head that I was supposed to score the goals, not try to knock the big guys around and end up getting hurt or getting a penalty. I remember very clearly the feeling of sitting in that penalty box-and how much I realized I didn't like sitting in that box!"

In a 2002 profile, writer John U. Bacon wrote that Wakabayashi "is perhaps the most unlikely star in the long history of Michigan sports, and surely one of the most inspirational." Former teammate Dean Lucier said, "The college game was made for him. He's the best player I've ever stepped on the ice with, for or against, and that includes Tony Esposito and Keith Magnuson."

Wakabayashi also played baseball at the University of Michigan and was named to the All-Big Ten Conference team as a second baseman.

=== Professional and coaching ===
In January 1967, Wakabayashi signed with the Detroit Red Wings and was assigned to play with the Red Wings' farm club in Memphis, Tennessee. He played in 1967 for the Memphis Wings and the Johnstown Jets. However, as one columnist later observed, "5–6, 150 pound Japanese forwards were not in great demand in the National Hockey League."

In 1968, Wakabayashi began to play in the Japan Ice Hockey League, mostly for the Kokudo Bunnies. He won the MVP award and helped the Seibu Tetsudo team remain unbeaten in the 1971–72 season. For 11 years, he was regularly among the league's leading scorers, including seven consecutive seasons without a penalty. While still playing, Wakabayashi also became the team's head coach in 1978. Wakabayashi also coached the Japan men's national ice hockey team at several international events, including the 1980 Winter Olympics. He continued to coach in the Japanese Hockey League until 1994. He has also served as vice president of the Japan Ice Hockey Federation.

== Corporate career ==
Yoshiaki Tsutsumi, who owned the Kokudo Bunnies, also owned the Seibu department store chain, the Seibu railroads, and was Japan's largest landowner. After Wakabayashi's hockey career ended, Tsutsumi hired him as President of Seibu Canada, which owned the Westin Prince Hotel in Toronto. In a 2002 interview, Wakabayashi credited his experience from the University of Michigan as the key to his success: "If not for Al Renfrew and the Michigan hockey team, I would probably be working with my dad in the factory in Chatham. I don't even want to think about that one."

== Personal life and death ==
Wakabayashi and his brother Herb moved to Japan in 1972. Wakabayashi later became a citizen of Japan, living in Tokyo in his later years. He died on July 9, 2023, aged 80, at a Tokyo hospital.

== Awards and honors ==
In 2001, Wakabayashi was one of three University of Michigan hockey players (along with Red Berenson and John Matchefts) selected by the WCHA as the Top 50 Players in 50-year history of the conference. He was inducted into the Chatham Sports Hall of Fame in 2004 and the University of Michigan Athletic Hall of Honor in 2006. On July 8, 2023, one day before his death, the Japan Ice Hockey League bestowed upon him a special achievement award on the league's 50th anniversary.

=== Other honors ===
Award	Year	Reference
NCAA All-Tournament Second Team	1964	
AHCA West All-American	1964–65	
All-WCHA First Team	1964–65	
WCHA Scoring Champion	1964–65	
All-WCHA Second Team	1965–66	
WCHA Player of the Year	1965–66	

Awards and achievements
Preceded by Gerry Kell	WCHA Most Valuable Player; 1965–66	Succeeded by Keith Christiansen
