= Ronald Naslund =

American ice hockey player (born 1943)

Personal information
- Full name: Ronald Alan Naslund
- Born: February 28, 1943 (age 83) Minneapolis, Minnesota, U.S.
Medal record
Men's ice hockey
Representing United States
Olympic Games
| Silver medal – second place | 1972 Sapporo | Team |

Ronald Alan Naslund (born February 28, 1943) is an ice hockey player who played for the American national team. He won a silver medal at the 1972 Winter Olympics.

Naslund played scholastically at Roosevelt High School in Minneapolis and collegiately at the University of Denver.
