= Al Renfrew =

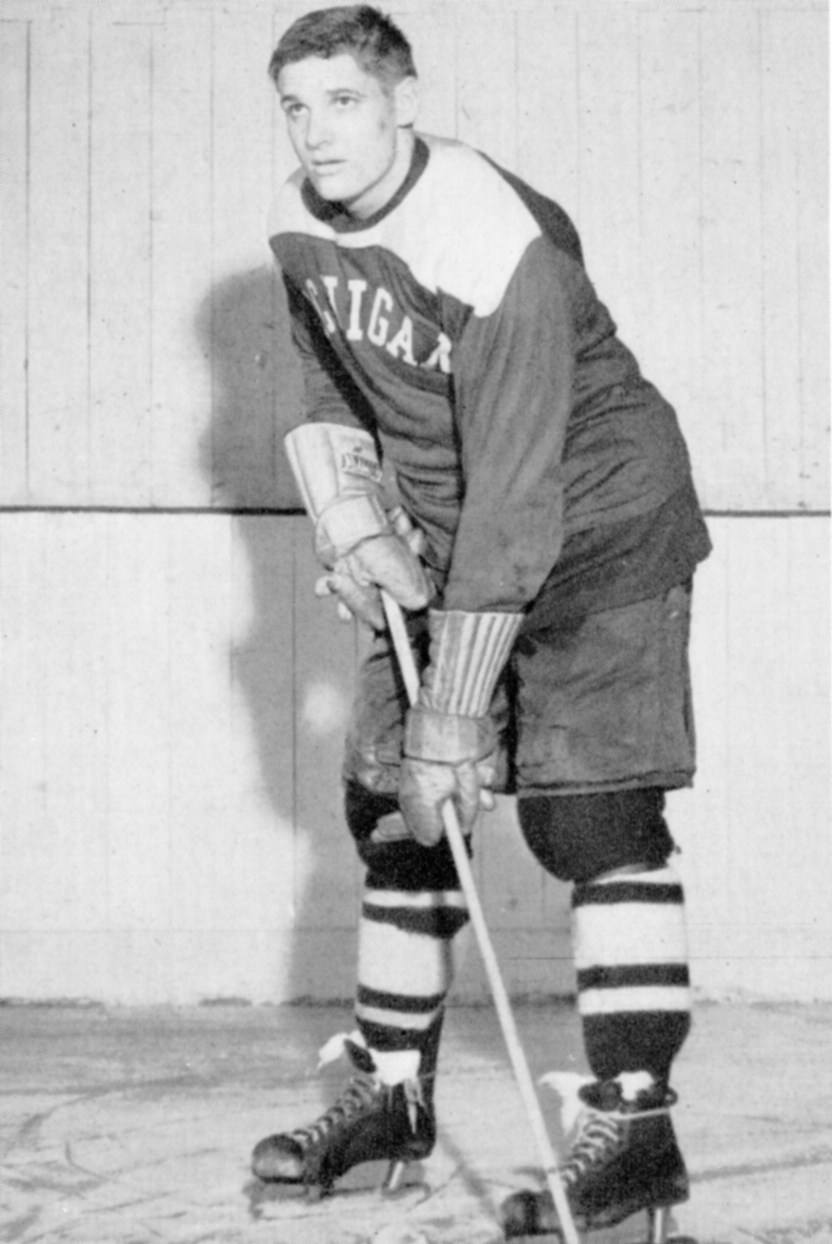
- Renfrew, 1949

Biographical details
- Born: December 21, 1924; Toronto, Ontario, Canada
- Died: November 10, 2014 (aged 89); Ann Arbor, Michigan, U.S.
- Education: University of Michigan

Playing career
- 1945–1949: Michigan
- 1949–1950: Detroit Auto Club
- Position: Wing

Coaching career (HC unless noted)
- 1951–1956: Michigan Tech
- 1956–1957: North Dakota
- 1957–1973: Michigan

Head coaching record
- Overall: 288–286–13 (.502)
- Tournaments: 4–2 (.667)

Accomplishments and honors

Championships
- 1961 Big Ten Champion; 1962 Big Ten Champion; 1964 Big Ten Champion; 1964 WCHA regular season champion 1964 NCAA National Champion; 1968 Big Ten Champion; 1969 Big Ten Champion

Awards
- 1986 University of Michigan Athletic Hall of Honor; 1990 Hobey Baker Legends of College Hockey Award; 1992 John "Snooks" Kelley Founders Award

Allan McNab Renfrew (December 21, 1924 – November 10, 2014) was a hockey player (left wing) at the University of Michigan in the late 1940s and a college hockey coach with Michigan Technological University (1951–1956), the University of North Dakota (1956–1957), and the University of Michigan (1957–1973). Renfrew had a storied career as a player, coach and administrator at the University of Michigan, including NCAA championships as both a player and coach. He was inducted into the University of Michigan Athletic Hall of Honor in 1986.

== College hockey player ==
A native of Toronto, Renfrew came to the University of Michigan in 1945. He played four years with the Michigan hockey team, and was selected as the team captain as a senior. As a freshman in 1946, he drew attention when he scored two goals separated by only seven seconds in a game against Michigan Tech. He was the leader of the Wolverines 1948 team that won the NCAA hockey championship. He scored 25 goals in 1948, including four in a game against Minnesota: "Al Renfrew, Michigan's speedy left winger, scored four times to lead the assault." The Wolverines finished the 1948 season by beating Dartmouth College, 8-4, in the first NCAA ice hockey championship held in March 1948 in Colorado Springs, Colorado. Renfrew scored 91 goals and 172 points, as the Wolverines went 70-18-6 while Renfrew was playing. Renfrew finished his playing career as the second leading point scorer in the history of Michigan hockey. He graduated from the School of Education in 1950 and later married the sister of his coach, Vic Heyliger.

== College hockey coach ==
After graduating from Michigan, Renfrew became the hockey coach at Michigan Tech in Houghton, Michigan, from 1951 to 1956 and at North Dakota for one year. In May 1957, Renfrew's former coach and brother-in-law Vic Heyliger retired as Michigan's hockey coach, and Renfrew accepted the job as Heyliger's replacement. As the coach of the Wolverines hockey team from 1957 to 1973, Renfrew had a record of 223-206-11 and one national championship. The national championship as coach came in 1964 season, when Michigan had a record of 24-4-1. Renfrew's 1964 team, behind the leadership of captain Gordon Wilkie and by Mel Wakabayashi's two goals, beat Denver 6-3 in their home arena to capture the program's seventh NCAA title. With the win, Al Renfrew also became the first person to play on an NCAA championship college hockey team and later coach a national champion. Including his six years as coach at Michigan Tech and North Dakota, his overall record as a coach was 288-286-13. When Renfrew retired as coach in May 1973, 200 of his friends held a testimonial dinner and presented him and his wife with a two-week trip to Hawaii. After retiring as the hockey coach in 1973, Renfrew worked for many years as the manager of the U-M ticket office.

== The "M" Club Banner ==
Aside from his contributions to the Michigan hockey program, Renfrew and his wife Marguerite are credited in some accounts as the individuals responsible for the football tradition of the "M" Club banner at Michigan Stadium. The tradition started in 1962 with Michigan players racing out of the tunnel and leaping into the air to touch the "Go Blue: M Club Supports You" banner while the Marching Band plays "The Victors". Renfrew reportedly asked his wife to make two flags to drape over the football locker rooms to cheer on the team. She made two flags, with a neighbor, and the Block M was designed by Bob Hoisington, an engineering dean, to make sure it was correct. They handmade the flags, which was not an easy feat at the time. Originally, the M Club members hung the banners in the locker room, and the banners were later moved to the tunnel and then the stadium. After the games, the flags came back home to the Renfrews' home and were hung at their house. Later, the flags were changed to a banner.

== Later life, awards and honors ==
In 1986, Renfrew was inducted into the University of Michigan Athletic Hall of Honor. He has also received the 1990 Hobey Baker Legends of College Hockey Award, presented each year to an individual who has made great contributions to college hockey, and the 1992 John "Snooks" Kelley Founders Award, given each year to a person in the coaching profession who has contributed to the overall growth and development of the sport of ice hockey in the United States. The "Friends of Al Renfrew" have established an endowed room and board scholarship at Michigan for an ice hockey player.

On November 10, 2014, Renfrew died in Michigan at the age of 89. He had a heart attack three weeks prior and was due to be released from a rehabilitation facility.

== Head coaching record ==
Record table
Season	Team	Overall	Conference	Standing	Postseason
Michigan Tech Huskies (MCHL) (1951–1953)
1951–52	Michigan Tech	2–18–0	0–12–0	7th	
1952–53	Michigan Tech	6–13–0	3–13–0	6th	
Michigan Tech:		8–31–0	3–25–0		
Michigan Tech Huskies (WIHL) (1953–1956)
1953–54	Michigan Tech	7–17–1	2–16–0	7th	
1954–55	Michigan Tech	12–13–1	8–11–1	4th	
1955–56	Michigan Tech	21–7–0	14–6–0	2nd	NCAA runner-up
Michigan Tech:		40–37–2	24–33–1		
North Dakota Fighting Sioux (WIHL) (1956–1957)
1956–57	North Dakota	18–11–0	13–9–0	3rd	
North Dakota:		18–11–0	13–9–0		
Michigan Wolverines (WIHL) (1957–1958)
1957–58	Michigan	8–13–0	7–11–0	6th	
Michigan:		8–13–0	7–11–0		
Michigan Wolverines (Big Ten) (1958–1959)
1958–59	Michigan	8–13–1	2–6–0	3rd	
Michigan:		8–13–1	2–6–0		
Michigan Wolverines (WCHA / Big Ten †) (1959–1973)
1959–60	Michigan	12–12–0	7–11–0 / 4–4–0	5th / 2nd	
1960–61	Michigan	16–10–2	15–8–1 / 6–2–0	3rd / 1st	WCHA East Regional Runner-Up
1961–62	Michigan	22–5–0	15–3–0 / 4–0–0	2nd / 1st	NCAA consolation game (win)
1962–63	Michigan	7–14–3	3–14–3 / 0–6–2	7th / 3rd	
1963–64	Michigan	24–4–1	12–2–0 / 7–1–0	1st / 1st	NCAA Champion
1964–65	Michigan	13–12–1	7–11–0 / 3–5–0	5th / 3rd	
1965–66	Michigan	14–14–0	9–9–0 / 3–5–0	5th / 3rd	WCHA first round
1966–67	Michigan	19–7–2	11–6–1 / 4–3–1	4th / 2nd	WCHA first round
1967–68	Michigan	18–9–0	11–7–0 / 7–1–0	4th / 1st	WCHA first round
1968–69	Michigan	16–12–0	10–8–0 / 7–5–0	4th / 1st	WCHA East Regional Finals
1969–70	Michigan	14–16–0	11–13–0 / 5–7–0	6th / 3rd	WCHA West Regional semifinals
1970–71	Michigan	9–21–0	5–17–0 / 2–8–0	9th / 3rd	
1971–72	Michigan	16–18–0	12–16–0 / 5–5–0	6th / 2nd	WCHA first round
1972–73	Michigan	6–27–1	4–25–1 / 1–11–0	10th / 4th	
Michigan:		206–181–10	132–150–6 / 58–63–3		
Total:		288–286–13			
National champion Postseason invitational champion Conference regular season champion Conference regular season and conference tournament champion Division regular season champion Division regular season and conference tournament champion Conference tournament champion

†Michigan played jointly in the Big Ten and WCHA from 1959 to 1981

== See also ==
- University of Michigan Athletic Hall of Honor

Sporting positions
Preceded by Amo Bessone	Head coach of Michigan Tech; 1951–1956	Succeeded by John MacInnes
Preceded by Fido Purpur	Head coach of the University of North Dakota; 1956–1957	Succeeded by Bob May
Preceded by Vic Heyliger	Head coach of the University of Michigan; 1957–1973	Succeeded by Dan Farrell
Awards and achievements
Preceded by Barry Thorndycraft	WCHA Coach of the Year; 1963–64	Succeeded by Bob Peters
Preceded by Jim Fullerton	Hobey Baker Legends of College Hockey Award; 1990	Succeeded by Jack Riley
