= 1964 WCHA men's ice hockey tournament =

1964 WCHA Men's ice hockey tournament
- Dates: March 12–14, 1964
- Teams: 4
- Finals site: Weinberg Coliseum; Ann Arbor, Michigan
- Champions: Denver (4th title)
- Winning coach: Murray Armstrong (4th title)
- WCHA Men's Ice Hockey Tournaments

The 1964 WCHA Men's Ice Hockey Tournament was the 5th conference playoff in league history. The tournament was played between March 12 and March 14, 1964. All games were played at home team campus sites. By reaching the title game both Denver and Michigan were invited to participate in the 1964 NCAA Men's Ice Hockey Tournament.

== Format ==
The top four teams in the WCHA, based upon the conference regular season standings, were eligible for the tournament and were seeded No. 1 through No. 4. In the first round the first and fourth seeds and the second and third seeds were matched in two-game series where the school that scored the higher number of goals was declared the winner. The winners advanced to the title game which was to be played at the higher remaining seed's home venue. Due to the ongoing dispute between Minnesota and Denver the Golden Gophers refused to participate in the tournament and were replaced by 5th-place North Dakota.

=== Conference standings ===
Note: GP = Games played; W = Wins; L = Losses; T = Ties; PCT = Winning percentage; GF = Goals for; GA = Goals against

1963–64 Western Collegiate Hockey Association standings
	Conference							Overall					
	GP	W	L	T	PCT	GF	GA	GP	W	L	T	GF	GA
Michigan†	14	12	2	0	.857	90	37	29	24	4	1	217	80
Denver*	10	7	2	1	.750	33	17	31	20	7	4	141	76
Minnesota	16	10	6	0	.625	65	65	25	14	11	0	105	115
Michigan Tech	16	9	7	0	.563	57	47	27	14	12	1	95	79
North Dakota	14	5	8	1	.393	37	41	25	12	11	2	79	72
Colorado College	16	4	11	1	.281	57	84	26	11	14	1	121	131
Michigan State	14	1	12	1	.107	42	90	26	8	17	1	100	134
Championship: Denver † indicates conference regular season champion * indicates conference tournament champion

== Bracket ==
First Round; March 12–13
1	Michigan	4	5	9
4	Michigan Tech	3	5	8
2	Denver	6	3	9
3	North Dakota	3	3	6

Final; March 14
1	Michigan	2
2	Denver	6

Note: * denotes overtime period(s)

=== First round ===
==== (1) Michigan vs. (4) Michigan Tech ====
March 12	Michigan	4 – 3	Michigan Tech	Weinberg Coliseum

March 13	Michigan	5 – 5	Michigan Tech	Weinberg Coliseum

Michigan won series 9–8

==== (2) Denver vs. (5) North Dakota ====
March 12	Denver	6 – 2	North Dakota	DU Arena

March 13	Denver	3 – 3	North Dakota	DU Arena

Denver won series 9–5

=== Final ===
==== (1) Michigan vs. (2) Denver ====
March 14	Michigan	2 – 6	Denver	Weinberg Coliseum

== Tournament awards ==
None

== See also ==
- Western Collegiate Hockey Association men's champions
