= Dan Farrell =

Canadian ice hockey player and coach

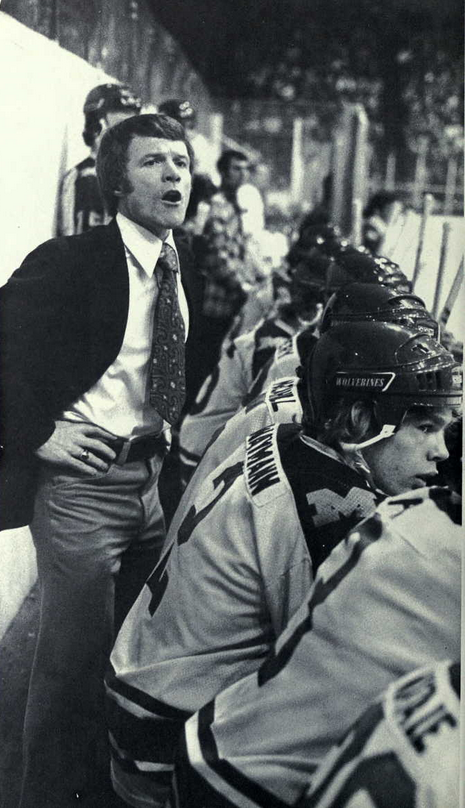
- Farrell from 1976 Michiganensian

Biographical details
- Born: 1937 (age 88–89); Barrie, Ontario, Canada
- Education: Michigan Technological University

Playing career
- 1955–1956: Hamilton Tiger Cubs
- 1957–1960: Michigan Tech
- Position: Wing

Coaching career (HC unless noted)
- 1967–1973: Michigan Tech (assistant)
- 1973–1980: Michigan
- 1986–1988: Oshawa Generals (assistant)

Head coaching record
- Overall: 135–133–6 (.504)
- Tournaments: 2–1 (.667)

Daniel Farrell (born 1937) is a former ice hockey player and coach. He played for the Michigan Tech Huskies men's ice hockey team from 1957-1960 and was the head coach of the Michigan Wolverines men's ice hockey team from 1973 to 1980. Farrell later had a career in the financial services and mineral resources industries. He is currently an officer and director of Copper Ridge Explorations, Inc.

== Early years ==
Farrell was born and raised in Barrie, Ontario, Canada, graduating from Barrie's St. Joseph's High School in 1954. He played hockey for the Hamilton Tiger Cubs from 1955-1956.

== Michigan Tech ==
He attended Michigan Technological University, where he played forward for Coach John MacInnes' Michigan Tech Huskies men's ice hockey team from 1957-1960. He was an assistant hockey coach at Michigan Tech from approximately 1968 to 1973. He led the Michigan Tech junior-varsity teams to a 38-13-1 record in three years.

== University of Michigan ==
In February 1973, Farrell was hired to replace Al Renfrew as the head coach of the Michigan Wolverines men's ice hockey team. He was the head coach at Michigan for seven years from 1973 to 1980. At Michigan, Farrell compiled a record of 135-129-6. Farrell's 1973-1974 team was the first to play at the team's new home in Yost Ice Arena. His best season as the head coach at Michigan was 1976-1977 when the team compiled a record of 28-17-0 (.622) and advanced to the NCAA hockey tournament. The team reached its nadir under Farrell in the 1978-1979 season with a record of 8-27-1, but rebounded in 1979-1980 with a 23-13-2 record. Despite the rebound, Farrell resigned as Michigan's head coach in March 1980. He was replaced the following month by Wilf Martin, who played on Michigan's 1964 national championship team. Martin lasted less than eight months before he, too, resigned.

== Business career ==
After resigning as the hockey coach in Michigan, Farrell had a career in business. He initially held positions in the financial services. As of 1993, Farrell was employed by the investment firm, IDS. He also held positions with Yorkton Securities and American Express Financial Services.

Farrell later transitioned to the natural resources industry. In approximately August 2002, he was a co-founder of Quincy Energy Corp., a uranium exploration company in Hancock, Michigan. He remained with Quincy as chairman, chief executive officer and a substantial shareholder until July 2006, when the company was acquired by Energy Metals Corp.

Farrell later founded Zacoro Metals Corp. where he served as president and chief executive officer from March 2006 to September 2008. After Zacoro was acquired by Aura Metals, Inc., Farrell served as the president and chief executive officer of Silver Predator Corp. from March 2009 to December 2009. In September 2009, he became vice president of corporate development and director of Copper Ridge Explorations, Inc., a company specializing in exploring mineral resource properties in western Canada and Alaska. He also serves as director of Hy Lake Gold Inc.

As of 2010, Farrell was also a Michigan Tech Fund Life Trustee.

== Head coaching record ==
Record table
Season	Team	Overall	Conference	Standing	Postseason
Michigan Wolverines (WCHA / Big Ten †) (1973–1980)
1973–74	Michigan	18–17–1	12–15–1 / 5–6–1	7th / t-3rd	WCHA First Round
1974–75	Michigan	22–17–1	17–15–0 / 6–6–0	6th / t-2nd	WCHA Second Round
1975–76	Michigan	21–18–0	17–15–0 / 8–4–0	4th / 2nd	WCHA Second Round
1976–77	Michigan	28–17–0	20–12–0 / 7–5–0	3rd / 2nd	NCAA Runner-Up
1977–78	Michigan	15–20–1	12–19–1 / 6–5–1	t-7th / 2nd	
1978–79	Michigan	8–27–1	6–25–1 / 3–9–0	10th / t-3rd	
1979–80	Michigan	23–17–2	13–11–2 / 7–5–0	4th / 2nd	WCHA First Round
Michigan:		135–133–6	97–112–5 / 42–40–2		
Total:		135–133–6			
National champion Postseason invitational champion Conference regular season champion Conference regular season and conference tournament champion Division regular season champion Division regular season and conference tournament champion Conference tournament champion

†Michigan played jointly in the Big Ten and WCHA from 1959 to 1981
