= Wilf Martin =

Canadian ice hockey player and coach

Biographical details
- Born: January 25, 1942 (age 84); St. Paul, Alberta, Canada
- Education: University of Michigan

Playing career
- 1960–1962: Regina Pats
- 1963–1965: Michigan
- 1965–1966: Alberta
- 1966–1967: Muskegon Mohawks
- 1966–1967: Seattle Totems
- 1967–1968: Cleveland Barons
- 1968–1971: Denver Spurs
- 1971–1972: Providence Reds
- 1971–1972: Salt Lake Golden Eagles
- Position: Center

Coaching career (HC unless noted)
- 1972–1973: Colorado State
- 1980: Michigan

Head coaching record
- Overall: 1–1–0 (.500)

Wilfred "Wilf" Martin (born January 25, 1942) is a former ice hockey player and coach. He played at the center position for the Michigan Wolverines men's ice hockey team from 1963 to 1965, including the 1963–1964 NCAA national championship team. He also served briefly as the head coach of the Michigan hockey team in 1980 before resigning for health reasons.

== Career ==
Martin was born in St. Paul, Alberta, and raised in Mallaig, Alberta. He played junior hockey for the Regina Pats of the Saskatchewan Junior Hockey League during the 1960–1961 and 1961–1962 seasons.

He subsequently attended the University of Michigan where he played on the Michigan Wolverines ice hockey team during the 1963–1964 and 1964–1965 seasons. During the Wolverines national championship season of 1963–1964, Martin scored 34 goals and totaled 24 assists and 58 points. During the Wolverines run for the national championship in 1964, Martin scored two goals to lead the team to a 4–3 playoff victory over Michigan Tech. He was the captain of the 1964–1965 team. In two seasons of college hockey at Michigan, Martin scored 54 goals and 37 assists.

During the 1965–1966 season, Martin played for the University of Alberta Golden Bears and won the scoring championship of the Western Canada Intercollegiate Athletic Association Hockey League. Martin scored 19 goals and 18 assists and broke WCIAA records for goals and points.

Martin played six years of professional hockey for the Muskegon Mohawks (1966–1967), Cleveland Barons (1967–1968), Denver Spurs (1968–1971), Providence Reds (1971–1972) and Salt Lake Golden Eagles (1971–1972). In his first two seasons at Denver, Martin scored 70 goals and tallied 74 assists and 144 points. Despite missing the first 10 games of the 1968–1969 season Martin was Denver's leading scorer with 67 points on 30 assists and 37 goals. When he retired, Martin held Denver's single-season and career records for goals, assists and points.

In 1972, Martin enrolled as a graduate student at Colorado State University. He also served as player-coach for the Colorado State hockey team during the 1972–1973 season. The 31-year-old graduate student led the Colorado State Rams to an 11–0–1 record in the regular season.

In the late 1970s, Martin was the rink manager at the University of Colorado.

In March 1980, after Dan Farrell resigned as the head coach of Michigan's hockey team, Martin was hired to replace him. After coaching the first two games of the 1980–1981 season, Martin stepped down for health reasons. He announced his resignation in late November 1980, eight months after being hired. At the time of his resignation, Martin said, "I've been having some health problems and have been away from the team for quite a while. I felt that in all fairness to the team and the program that I should resign." Athletic director said at the time that Martin would remain with the athletic department in a position to be determined.

Martin remained an employee of the University of Michigan athletic department. He retired in 2005.

== Head coaching record ==
=== College ===
Record table
Season	Team	Overall	Conference	Standing	Postseason
Michigan Wolverines (WCHA / Big Ten †) (1980–1980)
1980–81	Michigan	1–1–0†	0–0–0 / 0–0–0	– / –	
Michigan:		1–1–0	0–0–0 / 0–0–0		
Total:		1–1–0			
National champion Postseason invitational champion Conference regular season champion Conference regular season and conference tournament champion Division regular season champion Division regular season and conference tournament champion Conference tournament champion

†Martin resigned after 2 games
