= 1953–54 RPI Bachelors men's ice hockey season =

NCAA Champion Tri-State League co-champion 1954 NCAA, champion
- Conference: T–1st Tri-State League
- Home ice: Houston Field House

Record
- Overall: 18–5–0
- Home: 12–1–0
- Road: 4–4
- Neutral: 2–0

Coaches and captains
- Head coach: Ned Harkness
- Captain(s): Frank Chiarelli; Jim Shildneck

The 1953–54 RPI Bachelors men's ice hockey team represented Rensselaer Polytechnic Institute in intercollegiate college ice hockey during the 1953–54 NCAA men's ice hockey season. The head coach was Ned Harkness and the team co-captains were Frank Chiarelli and Jim Shildneck. The team won the 1954 NCAA Men's Ice Hockey Tournament. The team's leading scorer was Abbie Moore, who finished tied for second in the nation with 68 points.

== Season ==
Coming off a Tri-State League championship and the program's first appearance in the NCAA tournament, Rensselaer was primed to build on the previous years' success with the top five scorers all returning for another season. Also from the previous campaign was starting netminder Bob Fox who was among the best goalies in the nation in 1953.

The Bachelors opened their season with nine of their first ten games at home and used that to their advantage, sweeping the five games they played before the winter break. Their first big game came against Yale in New Haven where RPI would defeat a team that finished 4th in the east 4–2. After the break Rensselaer hosted their third Holiday Tournament and after winning games over Brown and Princeton they lost their first game of the season against St. Francis Xavier in the tournament championship. RPI won two more games, pushing their record to 9–1–0, before taking a week off in preparation for their weekend trip to Colorado.

Playing at high altitude for the first time since the previous year's tournament Rensselaer came out flat against a decent Denver squad, dropping their first contest 3–8 and followed that up with an identical loss to Colorado College the next night. After a day off the Bachelors returned to Denver for a rematch with the Pioneers and though they lost once more the fared much better in the game, losing 2–3 as they seemed to finally find their skating legs. Three days later RPI was back in New York facing Hamilton on the road and despite the jet lag they trounced the Continentals 11–0. Two days later the Bachelors finally opened their conference schedule with a win at Clarkson but after another win at Middlebury they dropped a match at St. Lawrence 4–5.

With RPI in danger of losing a chance at the NCAA tournament to the Saints they had no margin for error and swept the rest of their schedule until the rematch with the Larries on March 5. The game had been sold out for months and when the teams met they produced one of the most exciting games ever held at Houston Field House. Rensselaer skated away with the victory, earning them a tie with St. Lawrence as the co-champions of the Tri-State League. Despite the victory, however, the Saints had a better record, going 18–3–1 over the course of the season and were expected to be picked for the tournament but a selection of coaches and officials chose the Bachelors to head to the championship instead. Rensselaer's appearance was such a surprise that St. Lawrence had been included on the tournament programs and had their logo on the wooden pennant hanging outside the Broadmoor World Arena.

The "RIP" Bachelors entered as the fourth seed and drew Michigan who, despite having a lesser record than Minnesota, was the three-time defending champion and was riding a 7-game tournament winning streak. Rensselaer would have to wait, however, as Boston College opened against the Golden Gophers and were mercilessly eviscerated by Minnesota, losing by the largest margin in tournament history (1–14). Rensselaer had been given no chance entering the tournament but after the first semifinal there was a feeling from the spectators that Michigan would produce an equally lopsided victory. With all of the insults, slights and dismissals levied at their team the Bachelors responded in the only way they could; the small but fast team outskated the heavily favored Wolverines and with Gordie Peterkin recording a hat-trick, including the game-winner, Rensselaer won what was then considered the biggest upset the tournament had ever seen. Not only was their 6–4 win the first tournament victory by an eastern team over a western team in three years but it was the first time Rensselaer had ever defeated a western school.

While the defeated Wolverines took their frustrations out on their hotel rooms, the Bachelors had to prepare themselves for a showdown with the Golden Gophers the next night. The Bachelors opened the game with the first three goals of the contest, one from each of their top three scorers. While the crowd may have been stunned Minnesota was not and they came roaring back with four consecutive goals to take the lead in the third period. Just when it looked like Rensselaer's chance at the title had slipped away Frank Chiarelli set up Abbie Moore for his second goal of the game to tie the score with 3:50 left in regulation and sent the game into overtime, the first time the championship game would need an extra period. The tying goal seemed to buoy RPI who came out of the intermission flying and before two minutes had elapsed Peterkin had notched his second winning goal of the tournament.

Rensselaer's win was so improbably that it apparently flummoxed the voters for the tournament awards. Four Bachelors made their way onto the First All-Tournament Team: Bob Fox, Jim Pope, Frank Chiarelli and Gordie Peterkin. However it was Abbie Moore who was named as the Most Outstanding Player, the only time in tournament history that the MOP was not on the top team.

The Bachelors returned to Rensselaer following their championship. Although few members continued playing after their time at the institution, the thirteen players who were part of the team remained notable within the RPI community for their achievement.

Note: In the Spring of 1953 the Student Body voted that 'Bachelors' would be the new nickname of all athletic teams for RPI. The moniker would revert to Engineers in 1958.

== Standings ==
1953–54 Tri-State League standings
	Conference							Overall					
	GP	W	L	T	PTS	GF	GA	GP	W	L	T	GF	GA
Rensselaer†	6	5	1	0	10	28	14	23	18	5	0	141	59
St. Lawrence†	5	4	1	0	10	29	15	22	18	3	1	136	56
Clarkson	5	1	4	0	4	11	27	17	7	8	2	83	73
Middlebury	4	0	4	0	0	8	20	17	9	8	0	–	–
† indicates conference regular season champion

== Schedule ==
Date	Opponent^{#}	Rank^{#}	Site	Decision	Result	Record
Regular Season
November 28	vs. McGill*		Houston Field House • Troy, New York	Fox	W 7–3	1–0–0 (0–0–0)
December 5	vs. Providence*		Houston Field House • Troy, New York	Fox	W 14–3	2–0–0 (0–0–0)
December 10	at Yale*		New Haven Arena • New Haven, Connecticut	Fox	W 4–2	3–0–0 (0–0–0)
December 12	vs. Boston University*		Houston Field House • Troy, New York	Fox	W 8–2	4–0–0 (0–0–0)
December 18	vs. Hamilton*		Houston Field House • Troy, New York	Fox	W 15–0	5–0–0 (0–0–0)
Rensselaer Holiday Tournament
December 30	vs. Brown*		Houston Field House • Troy, New York (Rensselaer Holiday Tournament)	Fox	W 5–1	6–0–0 (0–0–0)
January 1	vs. Princeton*		Houston Field House • Troy, New York (Rensselaer Holiday Tournament)	Fox	W 5–0	7–0–0 (0–0–0)
January 2	vs. St. Francis Xavier*		Houston Field House • Troy, New York (Rensselaer Holiday Tournament)	Fox	L 1–4	7–1–0 (0–0–0)
January 9	vs. Northeastern*		Houston Field House • Troy, New York	Fox	W 7–1	8–1–0 (0–0–0)
January 15	vs. Princeton*		Houston Field House • Troy, New York	Fox	W 5–2	9–1–0 (0–0–0)
January 29	at Denver*		DU Arena • Denver, Colorado	Fox	L 3–8	9–2–0 (0–0–0)
January 30	at Colorado College*		Broadmoor World Arena • Colorado Springs, Colorado	Fox	L 3–8	9–3–0 (0–0–0)
February 1	at Denver*		DU Arena • Denver, Colorado	Fox	L 2–3	9–4–0 (0–0–0)
February 4	at Hamilton*		Russell Sage Rink • Clinton, New York	Fox	W 11–0	10–4–0 (0–0–0)
February 6	vs. Clarkson		Houston Field House • Troy, New York	Fox	W 8–0	11–4–0 (1–0–0)
February 8	vs. Middlebury		The War Memorial Field House • Middlebury, Vermont	Fox	W 4–2	12–4–0 (2–0–0)
February 12	at St. Lawrence		Appleton Arena • Canton, New York	Fox	L 4–5	12–5–0 (2–1–0)
February 13	at Clarkson		Walker Arena • Potsdam, New York	Fox	W 4–3	13–5–0 (3–1–0)
February 19	vs. American International*		Houston Field House • Troy, New York	Fox	W 12–0	14–5–0 (3–1–0)
February 27	vs. Middlebury		Houston Field House • Troy, New York	Fox	W 4–2	15–5–0 (4–1–0)
March 5	vs. St. Lawrence		Houston Field House • Troy, New York	Fox	W 4–2	16–5–0 (5–1–0)
NCAA Tournament
March 12	vs. Michigan*		Broadmoor World Arena • Colorado Springs, Colorado (National Semifinal)	Fox	W 6–4	17–5–0 (5–1–0)
March 13	vs. Minnesota*		Broadmoor World Arena • Colorado Springs, Colorado (National championship)	Fox	W 5–4 ^{OT}	18–5–0 (5–1–0)
*Non-conference game. Source:

== Roster and scoring statistics ==
No.	Name	Year	Position	Hometown	S/P/C	Games	Goals	Assists	Pts	PIM
7	Abbie Moore	Senior	C	Ottawa, ON	(Ontario)	23	36	32	68	14
8	Frank Chiarelli	Junior	F	Ottawa, ON	(Ontario)	23	35	27	62	21
9	Ambrose Mosco	Junior	LW	Renfrew, ON	(Ontario)	23	23	23	46	27
4	Frank Paradise	Senior	F	Somerville, MA	(Massachusetts)	23	10	17	27	15
5	John Magadini	Junior	F	Patchogue, NY	(New York (state))	23	14	10	24	26
10	Gordie Peterkin	Junior	C	Ottawa, ON	(Ontario)	23	15	7	22	74
18	Jim Pope	Junior	D/F	Ottawa, ON	(Ontario)	23	4	6	10	36
11	Bill Mouzavires	Sophomore	F	New York, NY	(New York (state))	15	1	3	4	4
15	Harry Williams	Freshman	C	New York, NY	(New York (state))	18	3	0	3	6
14	Bruce Baum	Sophomore	F	Larchmont, NY	(New York (state))	20	0	1	1	0
2	Lloyd Bauer	Junior	D	New Haven, CT	(Connecticut)	21	0	1	1	18
	Erik Larson	Senior	F			1	0	0	0	0
	Ray Weinzler	Senior				1	0	0	0	0
6	Jim Shildneck	Senior	D	Marblehead, MA	(Massachusetts)	7	0	0	0	8
16	Marty Karch	Sophomore	D	New York, NY	(New York (state))	21	0	0	0	20
1	Bob Fox	Junior	G	Verdun, PQ	(Quebec)	23	0	0	0	0
Total							141	127	268	

== Goaltending Statistics ==
No.	Name	Games	Minutes	Wins	Losses	Ties	Goals Against	Saves	Shut Outs	SV %	GAA
1	Bob Fox	23	1381	18	5	0	59	502	5	.895	2.56
Total		23	1381	18	5	0	59	502	5	.895	2.56

== 1954 championship ==
=== (W2) Minnesota vs. (E2) Rensselaer ===
March 17	Minnesota	4 – 5	OT	Rensselaer	Broadmoor Ice Palace	Recap

Scoring summary
Period	Team	Goal	Assist(s)	Time	Score
1st	RPI	Abbie Moore	Mosco	17:07	1–0 RPI
1st	RPI	Frank Chiarelli – PP	Paradise	19:42	2–0 RPI
2nd	RPI	Ambrose Mosco	Moore	22:45	3–0 RPI
2nd	MIN	Ken Yackel	unassisted	23:09	3–1 RPI
2nd	MIN	Dick Dougherty	Campbell	25:32	3–2 RPI
3rd	MIN	John Mayasich	Dougherty	44:29	3–3
3rd	MIN	Dick Dougherty	Mayasich	48:30	4–3 Minn
3rd	RPI	Abbie Moore	Chiarelli	56:10	4–4
1st Overtime	RPI	Gordie Peterkin – GW	Magadini	61:54	5–4 RPI

Shots by period
Team	1	2	3	OT	T
Minnesota	8	14	22	0	44
Rensselaer	11	8	4	2	25

Goaltenders
Team	Name	Saves	Goals against	Time on ice
MIN	Jim Mattson	20	5	
RPI	Bob Fox	40	4	

== See also ==
- 1954 NCAA Division I Men's Ice Hockey Tournament
- List of NCAA Division I Men's Ice Hockey Tournament champions
