= 1953 NCAA men's ice hockey tournament =

College ice hockey tournament

- Teams: 4
- Finals site: Broadmoor Ice Palace, Colorado Springs, Colorado
- Champions: Michigan Wolverines (4th title)
- Runner-up: Minnesota Golden Gophers (1st title game)
- Semifinalists: Rensselaer Engineers (1st Frozen Four); Boston University Terriers (3rd Frozen Four)
- Winning coach: Vic Heyliger (4th title)
- MOP: John Matchefts (Michigan)
- Attendance: 7,450

The 1953 NCAA Men's Ice Hockey Tournament was the culmination of the 1952–53 NCAA men's ice hockey season, the sixth such tournament in NCAA history. It was held from March 12 to 14, 1953, and concluded with Michigan defeating Minnesota 7-3. All games were played at the Broadmoor Ice Palace in Colorado Springs, Colorado.

Michigan's win capped off its third consecutive National Championship. As of 2018 no team has been able to match that achievement. Additionally, their 14 goals in the semifinal game against Boston University were the most ever for an NCAA tournament game, matched only by Minnesota in 1954. The Wolverines' goal differential (+16) is also a record for an NCAA tournament, equaling the record set by Colorado College in 1950 and matched by Wisconsin in 1983.

For the first time since the tournament began the 'Most Outstanding Player' was awarded to someone from the championship team.

== Qualifying teams ==
Four teams qualified for the tournament, two each from the eastern and western regions. The two best MCHL teams and a Tri-State League representative received bids into the tournament as did one independent school.

East							West						
Seed	School	Conference	Record	Berth type	Appearance	Last bid	Seed	School	Conference	Record	Berth type	Appearance	Last bid
1	Rensselaer	Tri-State League	14–3–1	At-Large	1st	Never	1	Michigan	MCHL	15–7–0	At-Large	6th	1952
2	Boston University	Independent	14–5–1	At-Large	3rd	1951	2	Minnesota	MCHL	22–5–0	At-Large	1st	Never

== Format ==
The eastern team judged as better was seeded as the top eastern team while the MCHL champion was given the top western seed. The second eastern seed was slotted to play the top western seed and vice versa. All games were played at the Broadmoor Ice Palace. All matches were Single-game eliminations with the semifinal winners advancing to the national championship game and the losers playing in a consolation game.

== Bracket ==
Semifinals; March 12–13
E1	Rensselaer	2
W2	Minnesota	3
W1	Michigan	14
E2	Boston University	2

National championship March 14
W2	Minnesota	3
W1	Michigan	7
Third-place game
E1	Rensselaer	6
E2	Boston University	3

Note: * denotes overtime period(s)

== Results ==
=== Semifinals ===
==== Minnesota vs. Rensselaer ====
March 12	Minnesota	3 – 2	Rensselaer	Broadmoor Ice Palace	Recap
(Yackel, Tschida) Bob Johnson - PP - 08:48		First period	No scoring
No scoring		Second period	02:12 - Frank Chiarelli (unassisted)
(Johnson, Yackel) Dick Meredith - PP - 04:35 (Mayasich, Campbell) Dick Dougherty - GW - 16:02		Third period	17:34 - Frank Chiarelli (unassisted)
Jim Mattson		Goalie stats	Bob Fox

==== Michigan vs. Boston University ====
March 13	Michigan	14 – 2	Boston University	Broadmoor Ice Palace	Recap
(Philpott) George Chin - 03:12 (Shave) Ron Martinson - 04:19 (unassisted) John Matchefts - GW - 04:42 (Martinson) Telly Mascarin - 07:51 (Chin, Cooney) Doug Mullen - 13:43		First period	No scoring
(unassisted) Burt Dunn - 04:03 (MacLellan) Burt Dunn - 04:16 (MacLellan, Philpott) George Chin - 11:00		Second period	No scoring
(Matchefts) Doug Philpott - 02:32 (Cooney, Chin) Doug Mullen - 15:13 (Chin, Mullen) Pat Cooney - 15:44 (unassisted) Ron Martinson - 17:03 (Mullen) Alex MacLellan - 19:36 (unassisted) Ron Martinson - 19:57		Third period	09:01 - Richard Rodenhiser (Denning); 14:57 - Mario Zanetti (Whalen)
Willard Ikola (21 saves / 22 saves) / Bill Lucier (3 saves / 4 shots)		Goalie stats

=== Consolation Game ===
==== Boston University vs. Rensselaer ====
March 14	Boston University	3 – 6	Rensselaer	Broadmoor Ice Palace
No Scoring		First period	09:57 - Gordie Peterkin (Paradise); 15:43 - Abbie Moore (unassisted)
(Zanetti, Tutuny) Paul Whalen - 04:45		Second period	10:04 - Ambrose Mosco (Moore); 16:34 - Abbie Moore (unassisted)
(Zanetti) Paul Whalen - 03:21 (Zanetti) Paul Cleary - 17:13		Third period	10:49 - Abbie Moore (unassisted); 14:29 - Abbie Moore (unassisted)

=== National Championship ===
==== Minnesota vs. Michigan ====
March 14	Minnesota	3 – 7	Michigan	Broadmoor Ice Palace

Scoring summary
Period	Team	Goal	Assist(s)	Time	Score
1st	UM	Jim Haas	MacLellan	05:48	1–0 UM
1st	MIN	Dick Meredith	Yackel	8:39	1–1
1st	MIN	Dick Dougherty	Campbell	11:34	2–1 MIN
2nd	UM	Doug Philpott	Shave	26:15	2–2
2nd	UM	Doug Mullen	Chin and Cooney	31:08	3–2 UM
3rd	UM	John Matchefts – GW PP	unassisted	43:38	4–2 UM
3rd	UM	Jim Haas	unassisted	47:17	5–2 UM
3rd	UM	Doug Philpott – PP	Haas	49:14	6–2 UM
3rd	MIN	Ken Yackel	Johnson and Dougherty	50:42	6–3 UM
3rd	UM	John Matchefts – EN	Philpott	59:49	7–3 UM
Penalty summary
Period	Team	Player	Penalty	Time	PIM
1st	none				
2nd	UM	Lou Paolatto			2:00
2nd	UM	Lou Paolatto			2:00
2nd	UM	Pat Cooney			2:00
2nd	UM	Alex MacLellan			2:00
3rd
3rd	MIN	Tom Wegleitner			2:00
3rd	MIN	Jim Tschida			2:00
3rd	UM	Jim Haas			2:00
3rd	UM	Reggie Shave			2:00

Shots by period
Team	1	2	3	T
Michigan	14	11	9	34
Minnesota	12	10	6	28

Goaltenders
Team	Name	Saves	Goals against	Time on ice
UM	Willard Ikola	25	3	
MIN	Jim Mattson	28	6	

== All-Tournament team ==
=== First Team ===
- G: Jim Mattson (Minnesota)
- D: Alex MacLellan (Michigan)
- D: Tom Wegleitner (Minnesota)
- F: John Matchefts* (Michigan)
- F: Dick Meredith (Minnesota)
- F: Abbie Moore (Rensselaer)

* Most Outstanding Player(s)

=== Second Team ===
- G: Willard Ikola (Michigan)
- D: Herb LaFontaine (Rensselaer)
- D: Reggie Shave (Michigan)
- F: John Mayasich (Minnesota)
- F: George Chin (Michigan)
- F: Frank Chiarelli (Rensselaer)
