= 1953–54 NCAA men's ice hockey season =

- Duration: November 1953– March 13, 1954
- NCAA tournament: 1954
- National championship: Broadmoor Ice Palace; Colorado Springs, Colorado
- NCAA champion: Rensselaer

The 1953–54 NCAA men's ice hockey season began in November 1953 and concluded with the 1954 NCAA Men's Ice Hockey Tournament's championship game on March 13, 1954 at the Broadmoor Ice Palace in Colorado Springs, Colorado. This was the 7th season in which an NCAA ice hockey championship was held and is the 60th year overall where an NCAA school fielded a team.

Entering the season, in an effort to more accurately reflect the geographic location of the member school, the MCHL changed the conference name to 'Western Intercollegiate Hockey League'.

== Regular season ==
=== Season tournaments ===
Tournament	Dates	Teams	Champion
Boston Arena Christmas Tournament	December 29–30	4	St. Lawrence
Rensselaer Holiday Tournament	December 30–January 2	4	St. Francis Xavier
Beanpot	January 11–12	4	Boston College

=== Standings ===
1953–54 NCAA Independent ice hockey standings
	Intercollegiate							Overall					
	GP	W	L	T	Pct.	GF	GA	GP	W	L	T	GF	GA
Amherst	–	–	–	–	–	–	–	12	6	6	0	–	–
American International	–	–	–	–	–	–	–	15	5	10	0	–	–
Army	14	7	7	0	.500	51	73	17	10	7	0	66	79
Boston College	–	–	–	–	–	–	–	21	17	4	0	98	70
Boston University	20	4	15	1	.225	62	122	20	4	15	1	62	122
Bowdoin	–	–	–	–	–	–	–	9	6	2	1	–	–
Brown	–	–	–	–	–	–	–	20	12	8	0	91	70
Colby	–	–	–	–	–	–	–	4	0	4	0	–	–
Dartmouth	–	–	–	–	–	–	–	28	15	13	0	141	110
Hamilton	–	–	–	–	–	–	–	13	4	9	0	–	–
Harvard	–	–	–	–	–	–	–	22	10	10	2	81	100
Massachusetts	–	–	–	–	–	–	–	10	0	9	1	36	86
MIT	–	–	–	–	–	–	–	12	3	9	0	–	–
New Hampshire	–	–	–	–	–	–	–	8	2	5	1	35	45
Northeastern	–	–	–	–	–	–	–	18	5	12	1	59	99
Norwich	–	–	–	–	–	–	–	15	9	6	0	–	–
Princeton	–	–	–	–	–	–	–	18	4	12	2	47	65
Providence	–	–	–	–	–	–	–	14	4	10	0	71	100
St. Olaf	–	–	–	–	–	–	–	–	–	–	–	–	–
Tufts	–	–	–	–	–	–	–	14	7	6	1	–	–
Williams	–	–	–	–	–	–	–	10	1	9	0	–	–
Yale	–	–	–	–	–	–	–	19	11	5	3	88	59

1953–54 Minnesota Intercollegiate Athletic Conference ice hockey standings
	Conference							Overall					
	GP	W	L	T	PTS	GF	GA	GP	W	L	T	GF	GA
Minnesota–Duluth †	10	9	1	0	.900	–	–	17	10	7	0	–	–
Augsburg	–	–	–	–	–	–	–	–	–	–	–	–	–
Concordia	–	–	–	–	–	–	–	4	0	4	0	–	–
Gustavus Adolphus	–	–	–	–	–	–	–	8	3	5	0	–	–
Hamline	–	–	–	–	–	–	–	–	–	–	–	–	–
Macalester	–	–	–	–	–	–	–	–	–	–	–	–	–
Saint John's	–	–	–	–	–	–	–	11	4	7	0	–	–
St. Thomas	–	–	–	–	–	–	–	10	8	2	0	–	–
† indicates conference champion

1953–54 Tri-State League standings
	Conference							Overall					
	GP	W	L	T	PTS	GF	GA	GP	W	L	T	GF	GA
Rensselaer†	6	5	1	0	10	28	14	23	18	5	0	141	59
St. Lawrence†	5	4	1	0	10	29	15	22	18	3	1	136	56
Clarkson	5	1	4	0	4	11	27	17	7	8	2	83	73
Middlebury	4	0	4	0	0	8	20	17	9	8	0	–	–
† indicates conference regular season champion

1953–54 Western Intercollegiate Hockey League
	Conference							Overall					
	GP	W	L	T	PTS	GF	GA	GP	W	L	T	GF	GA
Minnesota†	20	16	3	1	20½	117	61	30	23	6	1	186	86
Michigan	16	12	3	1	18½	83	54	23	15	6	2	120	84
North Dakota	16	9	6	1	14½	70	47	27	14	12	1	123	102
Denver	14	7	7	0	11	74	71	25	16	9	0	165	106
Colorado College	14	6	8	0	11	48	58	24	14	9	1	118	88
Michigan State	18	4	13	1	6½	56	69	23	8	14	1	92	81
Michigan Tech	18	2	16	0	2	36	114	25	7	17	1	94	133
† indicates conference regular season champion Note: All games played between league members counted in the standings. When teams played each other twice, two points were awarded for a win, one point for a tie. When teams met each other four times, one point was awarded for a win, one-half point for a tie. Maximum of 24 points available.

== 1954 NCAA Tournament ==
Semifinals; March 11–12
E1	Boston College	1
W2	Minnesota	14
W1	Michigan	4
E2	Rensselaer	6

National championship March 13
W2	Minnesota	4
E2	Rensselaer	5*
Third-place game
W1	Michigan	7
E1	Boston College	2

Note: * denotes overtime period(s)

== Player stats ==
=== Scoring leaders ===
The following players led the league in points at the conclusion of the season.

GP = Games played; G = Goals; A = Assists; Pts = Points; PIM = Penalty minutes

Player	Class	Team	GP	G	A	Pts	PIM
John Mayasich	Junior	Minnesota	28	29	49	78	20
Richard Dougherty	Junior	Minnesota	28	42	26	68	41
Abbie Moore	Senior	Rensselaer	23	36	32	68	14
Frank Chiarelli	Junior	Rensselaer	23	35	28	63	21
John Titus	Senior	Dartmouth	-	37	24	61	-
Doug Mullen	Senior	Michigan	23	22	39	61	24
Jack Smith	Sophomore	Denver	26	21	39	60	-
Ben Cherski	Junior	North Dakota	27	40	16	56	26
Brian McFarlane	Junior	St. Lawrence	22	31	24	55	12
Bill MacFarland	Sophomore	Michigan	23	30	23	53	41

=== Leading goaltenders ===
The following goaltenders led the league in goals against average at the end of the regular season while playing at least 33% of their team's total minutes.

GP = Games played; Min = Minutes played; W = Wins; L = Losses; OT = Overtime/shootout losses; GA = Goals against; SO = Shutouts; SV% = Save percentage; GAA = Goals against average

Player	Class	Team	GP	Min	W	L	OT	GA	SO	SV%	GAA
Bob Fox	Junior	Rensselaer	23	1382	18	5	0	59	5	.895	2.56
Bill Sloan	Sophomore	St. Lawrence	22	1265	18	3	1	56	3	.908	2.66
Jim Mattson	Junior	Minnesota	26	1565	-	-	-	72	4	.888	2.76
Spike Schultz	Sophomore	North Dakota	27	-	-	-	-	-	4	.898	3.54
Edward Schiller	Sophomore	Michigan State	16	-	-	-	-	-	-	-	3.73
George Scherer	Sophomore	Yale	-	-	-	-	-	-	-	-	3.73
Bill Begg	Junior	Denver	-	-	12	9	0	-	0	.835	4.54
Bob McManus	Freshman	Michigan Tech	-	-	-	-	-	-	-	.891	5.07
Harry Taylor	Senior	Michigan Tech	-	-	-	-	-	-	-	.839	5.14

== Awards ==
=== NCAA ===
Award		Recipient
Spencer Penrose Award		Vic Heyliger, Michigan
Most Outstanding Player in NCAA Tournament		Abbie Moore, Rensselaer
AHCA All-American Team
First Team	Position	Second Team
Spike Schultz, North Dakota	G	Bill Sloan, St. Lawrence
Bob Kiley, Boston College	D	Doug Binning, Middlebury
Ken Yackel, Minnesota	D	Jim Haas, Michigan
Ben Cherski, North Dakota	F	Frank Chiarelli, Rensselaer
Richard Dougherty, Minnesota	F	Wally Kilrea Jr., Yale
John Mayasich, Minnesota	F	Abbie Moore, Rensselaer

=== WIHL ===
No Awards

All-WIHL Teams
First Team	Position	Second Team
Jim Mattson, Minnesota	G	Spike Schultz, North Dakota
Ken Yackel, Minnesota	D	Phil Hilton, Colorado College
Jim Haas, Michigan	D	Bill Abbott, Denver
John Mayasich, Minnesota	F	Doug Mullen, Michigan
Richard Dougherty, Minnesota	F	George Chin, Michigan
Ben Cherski, North Dakota	F	Bill MacFarland, Michigan
	F	Jack Smith, Denver
