= John Mariucci =

American ice hockey player, coach, and administrator

- Hockey Hall of Fame, 1985 (Builder)
- Born: May 8, 1916 Eveleth, Minnesota, U.S.
- Died: March 23, 1987 (aged 70) Minneapolis, Minnesota, U.S.
- Height: 5 ft 10 in (178 cm)
- Weight: 196 lb (89 kg; 14 st 0 lb)
- Position: Defence
- Shot: Left
- Played for: Chicago Black Hawks
- Playing career: 1940–1952
- Coaching career

Biographical details
- Education: University of Minnesota

Coaching career (HC unless noted)
- 1952–1955: Minnesota
- 1956–1966: Minnesota

Head coaching record
- Overall: 197–140–18 (.580)

Accomplishments and honors

Championships
- 1953 MCHL Champion; 1954 WIHL Champion; 1960 Big Ten Champion; 1961 WCHA Tournament Champion; 1963 Big Ten Champion; 1965 Big Ten Champion; 1966 Big Ten Champion

Awards
- 1953 Spencer Penrose Award

John Mariucci - Coaches Section in a team program.

John Peter Mariucci (May 8, 1916 – March 23, 1987) was an American ice hockey player, administrator and coach. Mariucci was born in Eveleth, Minnesota. He attended the University of Minnesota where he played for both the hockey and football teams. He was named an All-American in hockey in 1940. Mariucci was inducted into the inaugural 1973 class of the United States Hockey Hall of Fame and was elected to the Hockey Hall of Fame as a builder in 1985.

== Playing career ==
After starring for the Eveleth hockey and football teams, Mariucci went to college at the University of Minnesota where he played both sports – leading his hockey squad to an undefeated AAU championship in 1940. Mariucci played for the Chicago Black Hawks for five seasons and was the team captain in 1945–46 and 1947–48. Mariucci was known primarily as a defensive-minded bruiser, finishing with only 11 goals and 34 assists in 223 games, but totaled 308 penalty minutes. He lost three seasons while serving in World War II (1942–43 through 1944–45), but played two seasons for the United States Coast Guard Cutters in the Eastern Amateur Hockey League. Mariucci's best season with the Black Hawks came in 1946–47 when he played in 52 of the team's 60 games and finished with 9 goals and 11 assists and his 110 penalty minutes were second in the league to Gus Mortson.

On October 28, 1948, Chicago traded Mariucci to the St. Louis Flyers of the American Hockey League for cash. After one season in St. Louis, on September 4, 1949, Mariucci was traded to the Minneapolis Millers in the United States Hockey League (USHL), again for cash. He spent the 1950–51 season with the USHL St. Paul Saints and then returned to the Millers (this time in the All-American Hockey League) for the 1951–52 season before retiring.

== Coaching career ==
After his professional playing career ended, Mariucci became the head coach of the Minnesota Golden Gophers hockey team. He was noted for not attempting to sign Canadian players for his hockey teams, but instead relying on home-grown talent from Minnesota. This helped to grow youth and high school hockey programs in the state of Minnesota. He was coach at the university from the 1952–53 season until the 1965–66 season, except for the 1955–56 season in which he was the head coach of the US Olympic team that won a silver medal. Mariucci's best Gopher team came in 1953–54 when Minnesota would advance all the way to the NCAA finals before losing to Rensselaer Polytechnic Institute, 5–4 in overtime.

In 1967, he was named the assistant to the general manager for the Minnesota North Stars, with Glen Sonmor becoming the Gophers' coach. He eventually worked for Lou Nanne, one of his Gopher Hockey players, and held the position with the North Stars until his death in 1987. He returned to the international scene as the head coach of the United States team at the 1976 and 1977 Ice Hockey World Championships.

He was involved in a bizarre confrontation with Nanne during the 1977 championships. After loudly criticizing Nanne during the game against the Soviet Union, Nanne responded by charging his coach, which led to a fist fight while the game continued. After the game finished, the fight continued until both men were separated by players and officials.

The University of Minnesota honored him by first renaming the hockey arena in Williams Arena after him and later when a new hockey arena was opened in 1993, the school transferred his name to that one as well, Mariucci Arena.

In 1983, the John Mariucci Award, began to be awarded to the Minnesota High school coach of the year, as selected by the state's hockey coaches, as Mariucci is immortalized as the "Godfather of Minnesota Hockey".

Upon his death, the Minnesota North Stars wore a memorial round patch, with initials JM within, for parts of the 1987–1988 season.

== Career statistics ==
			Regular season					Playoffs
Season	Team	League	GP	G	A	Pts	PIM	GP	G	A	Pts	PIM
1939–40	University of Minnesota	AAU	—	—	—	—	—	—	—	—	—	—
1940–41	Chicago Black Hawks	NHL	23	0	5	5	33	5	0	2	2	16
1940–41	Providence Reds	AHL	17	3	3	6	15	—	—	—	—	—
1941–42	Chicago Black Hawks	NHL	47	5	8	13	44	3	0	0	0	0
1942–43	United States Coast Guard Cutters	EAHL	45	23	23	46	67	12	4	8	12	14
1943–44	United States Coast Guard Cutters	EAHL	34	11	16	27	29	12	3	8	11	18
1945–46	Chicago Black Hawks	NHL	50	3	8	11	58	4	0	1	1	10
1946–47	Chicago Black Hawks	NHL	52	2	9	11	110	—	—	—	—	—
1947–48	Chicago Black Hawks	NHL	51	1	4	5	63	—	—	—	—	—
1948–49	St. Louis Flyers	AHL	68	12	30	42	74	7	0	1	1	12
1949–50	Minneapolis Millers	USHL	67	8	24	32	87	7	0	2	2	23
1950–51	St. Paul Saints	USHL	59	2	28	30	85	4	0	0	0	0
1951–52	Minneapolis Millers	AAHL	39	18	31	49	45	—	—	—	—	—
NHL totals			223	11	34	45	308	12	0	3	3	26

== Head coaching record ==
Record table
Season	Team	Overall	Conference	Standing	Postseason
Minnesota Golden Gophers (MCHL) (1952–1953)
1952–53	Minnesota	23–6–0	16–4–0	1st	NCAA Runner-Up
Minnesota:		23–6–0	16–4–0		
Minnesota Golden Gophers (WIHL) (1953–1955)
1953–54	Minnesota	23–6–1	16–3–1	1st	NCAA Runner-Up
1954–55	Minnesota	16–12–2	11–12–2	3rd	
Minnesota:		39–18–3	27–15–3		
Minnesota Golden Gophers (WIHL) (1956–1958)
1956–57	Minnesota	12–15–2	7–15–2	6th	
1957–58	Minnesota	16–11–0	13–11–0	4th	
Minnesota:		28–26–2	20–26–2		
Minnesota Golden Gophers (Big Ten) (1958–1959)
1958–59	Minnesota	12–10–2	4–3–1	2nd	
Minnesota:		12–10–2	4–3–1		
Minnesota Golden Gophers (WCHA / Big Ten) (1955–1966)
1959–60	Minnesota	9–16–2	8–15–1 / 5–3–0	6th / 1st	
1960–61	Minnesota	17–11–1	14–6–0 / 5–3–0	2nd / 2nd	NCAA Third Place Game (Win)
1961–62	Minnesota	9–10–2	5–10–1 / 0–3–1	6th / 3rd	
1962–63	Minnesota	16–7–4	10–7–3 / 5–1–2	4th / 1st	WCHA First Round
1963–64	Minnesota	14–12–1	10–6–0 / 5–3–0	3rd / 2nd	WCHA First Round
1964–65	Minnesota	14–12–2	10–8–0 / 5–3–0	3rd / 1st	WCHA First Round
1965–66	Minnesota	16–11–0	13–9–0 / 5–3–0	t-2nd / 1st	WCHA First Round
Minnesota:		95–79–12	73–61–5 / 30–19–3		
Total:		197–140–18			
National champion Postseason invitational champion Conference regular season champion Conference regular season and conference tournament champion Division regular season champion Division regular season and conference tournament champion Conference tournament champion

Sporting positions
Preceded by Clint Smith	Chicago Black Hawks captain 1945–46	Succeeded by Red Hamill
Preceded by Red Hamill	Chicago Black Hawks captain 1947–48	Succeeded by Gaye Stewart
Awards and achievements
Preceded by Cheddy Thompson	Spencer Penrose Award; 1952–53	Succeeded by Vic Heyliger
Preceded by Vic Heyliger	Hobey Baker Legends of College Hockey Award; 1983	Succeeded by Murray Armstrong
