= Willard Ikola =

American ice hockey player and coach (1932–2025)

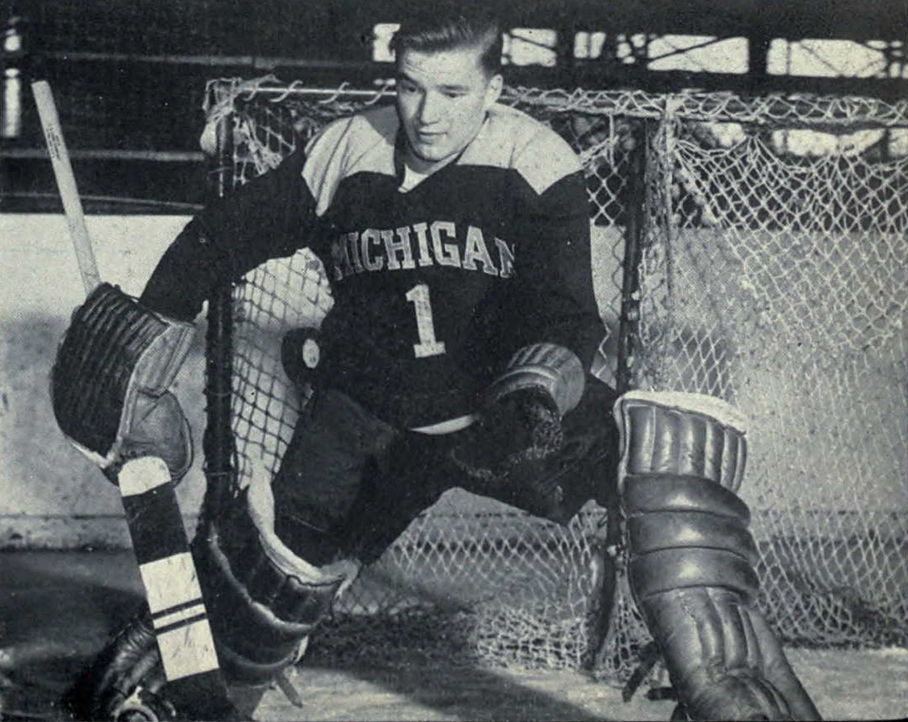
- Ikola from 1952 Michiganensian
- Born: July 28, 1932 Eveleth, Minnesota, U.S.
- Died: January 20, 2025 (aged 92) Edina, Minnesota
- Height: 5 ft 8 in (173 cm)
- Weight: 155 lb (70 kg; 11 st 1 lb)
- Position: Goaltender
- Caught: Left
- Playing career: 1950–1958
Medal record
Men's Ice hockey
Representing United States
Silver medal – second place	1956 Cortina d'Ampezzo	Ice hockey

Willard John Ikola (July 28, 1932 – January 20, 2025) was a Finnish American ice hockey player and high school boys' hockey coach. Born in Eveleth, Minnesota, a powerhouse in hockey (owning seven state high school championships, including the very first Minnesota state hockey tournament in 1945, and producing six members of US Olympic hockey teams) he began playing hockey as a young boy, eventually going on to play in the 1956 Winter Olympics and coaching high school for over 30 years.

== Background ==
Willard Ikola was born in Eveleth, a small town in northern Minnesota that had one of the state's most respected youth hockey programs. Ikola got his start playing hockey as a boy in Eveleth. He soon took up the position of goaltender, the latest in the line of exceptional goalies produced by Eveleth that included Frank Brimsek, Mike Karakas, and Sam LoPresti.

Ikola was of Finnish descent. His brother Roy Ikola was also an ice hockey goaltender. Willard Ikola died in Edina, Minnesota on January 20, 2025, at the age of 92.

== Hockey career ==
Ikola started at goalie his freshman year at Eveleth High School. He was the losing goalie in the state semi-finals and third-place game. Ikola was undefeated the next three years, helping the Eveleth boys' hockey team win three consecutive state championships (1948–1950) in the last three years of his high school career. He went on to play with the International Hockey League team, the Detroit Auto Club (1951–1952). After less than a year in the IHL, Ikola went to play in the National Collegiate Athletic Association at the University of Michigan. Although he only played two seasons as a Wolverine, during his time at the University of Michigan, Ikola played on two NCAA championship teams in 1952 and 1953.

After college, Ikola joined the US Air Force. In 1955, while still serving in the Air Force, Ikola joined the United States Olympic hockey team, where he would play in the 1956 Winter Olympics in Cortina, Italy. Ikola helped the US hockey team earn a silver medal as well as being named outstanding goalie of the games. Ikola, alongside former Michigan teammate John Matchefts, became the first Michigan medalist in the Winter Games. Although the hockey team lost the gold medal to the Soviet Union, they beat the hockey powerhouse Canadian team in the semi-final round for a chance at the gold. At that time, professional hockey was still developing in the United States, and all of the players on the US Olympic team were college-level players, while other teams like Canada and the Soviet Union were composed of professional players.

After playing a few more seasons with the US Olympic team, Ikola retired from playing hockey in 1958. However, he did not leave the sport completely. Ikola left his job as an Air Force instructor in California after University of Minnesota hockey coach John Mariucci recommended Ikola take up a P.E. teaching and coaching position for the Edina-Morningside High School boys' hockey team, where he became one of the most successful high school coaches in history.

== High school coaching career ==
As head ice hockey coach at Edina High School and Edina East High School in Edina, Minnesota, Ikola compiled a 616-149-38 record, which is third-best in the nation and the 2nd most wins by any coach in the state of Minnesota. During his 33-year career (1958–91), Ikola's teams won 22 Lake Conference championships, 19 section titles, and eight state championships. Fifteen of his teams won more than 20 games (out of approximately 25 to 30 games per season), and he had only one losing season; his first year as a coach. During his high school coaching career, Ikola was named Minnesota high school hockey coach of the year six times.

Famous for his trademark houndstooth hat, Ikola was modest when speaking of his coaching record. "I never scored a goal or prevented one either," he said. "All the credit for our success belongs to the kids."

Although he retired from coaching in 1991, he still stayed active in hockey by becoming a scout for the NHL's New York Islanders.

== Awards and honors ==
Award	Year
All-MCHL Second Team	1951–52; 1952–53
NCAA All-Tournament Second Team	1953
IIHF 1956 Winter Olympics best goaltender	1956

== Hall of fame inductions and honors ==
- 1990 – United States Hockey Hall of Fame
- 1990 – The John Mariucci Award, awarded by the American Hockey Coaches Association
- 1990 – The University of Michigan Hall of Honor
- 1992 – National High School Sports Hall of Fame^{[1]}
- 1997 – Edina Athletic Hall of Fame.
- 2019 – Minnesota Sports Hall of Fame

== See also ==
- University of Michigan Athletic Hall of Honor
