= Bob Kiley (ice hockey) =

American ice hockey player (1933–2013)

- Born: May 24, 1933 Medford, Massachusetts, USA
- Died: November 19, 2013 (aged 80) Montrose, New York, USA
- Position: Defenceman
- Played for: Boston College
- Playing career: 1951–1954

Robert J. Kiley was an American ice hockey defenceman who was an All-American for Boston College.

== Career ==
Kiley joined Boston College a year after the team won its first National Championship. Kiley made the varsity team in 1951 and helped the team finish with a 17–3 record, but they were somehow passed over for the NCAA Tournament. The following year Kiley continued to perform well for the Eagles and he helped BC in the inaugural Beanpot tournament. Though the team finished in 3rd place he was selected for the All-Tournament team. In his senior season, Kiley was again prominent during the Beanpot, this time helping Boston College win the in-season tournament, and BC finished the year with a 17–2 record. This time not only were they selected for the 1954 tournament but Kiley was the only eastern player to be selected as an AHCA First Team All-American. Unfortunately, BC's appearance in 1954 ended up being the worst run of any team in the history of the tournament. Minnesota throttled the Eagles 1–14 in the semifinal, the worst loss in the history of the tournament (as of 2020), then Michigan won the consolation game 7–2. As of 2020 the 1954 BC team holds several unenviable records, including the worst goal differential for a tournament and/or frozen four (-18).

Despite the disastrous end, BC was 45–11–1 with Kiley on the team and was sorely missed after graduating with a B.S. in accounting. Kiley later served in the Korean War and earned a Master's in Economics. Kiley was inducted into the Boston College Athletic Hall of Fame in 1996.

== Awards and honors ==
Award	Year
AHCA First Team All-American	1953–54
