= 1951–52 NCAA men's ice hockey season =

- Duration: November 1951– March 15, 1952
- NCAA tournament: 1952
- National championship: Broadmoor Ice Palace; Colorado Springs, Colorado
- NCAA champion: Michigan

The 1951–52 NCAA men's ice hockey season began in November 1951 and concluded with the 1952 NCAA Men's Ice Hockey Tournament's championship game on March 15, 1952 at the Broadmoor Ice Palace in Colorado Springs, Colorado. This was the 5th season in which an NCAA ice hockey championship was held and is the 58th year overall where an NCAA school fielded a team.

This was the first season of play for the MCHL. The conference was the first for western teams and would eventually become the WCHA.

== Regular season ==
=== Season tournaments ===
Tournament	Dates	Teams	Champion
Rensselaer Holiday Tournament	December 27–29	8	Brown
New England Invitational Tournament	March 1–3	4	Boston University

=== Standings ===
1951–52 NCAA Independent ice hockey standings
	Intercollegiate							Overall					
	GP	W	L	T	Pct.	GF	GA	GP	W	L	T	GF	GA
American International	–	–	–	–	–	–	–	13	8	5	0	–	–
Amherst	–	–	–	–	–	–	–	5	4	1	0	–	–
Army	14	3	11	0	.214	42	80	15	3	12	0	46	87
Boston College	–	–	–	–	–	–	–	20	17	3	0	117	49
Boston University	19	15	3	1	.816	128	52	19	15	3	1	128	52
Bowdoin	–	–	–	–	–	–	–	6	3	3	0	–	–
Brown	–	–	–	–	–	–	–	21	13	7	1	111	63
Colby	–	–	–	–	–	–	–	12	2	10	0	–	–
Dartmouth	–	–	–	–	–	–	–	23	5	18	0	48	91
Hamilton	–	–	–	–	–	–	–	11	5	6	0	–	–
Harvard	–	–	–	–	–	–	–	19	8	11	0	86	75
Lehigh	0	0	0	0	-	0	0	3	1	2	0	11	14
MIT	–	–	–	–	–	–	–	14	0	14	0	–	–
New Hampshire	–	–	–	–	–	–	–	10	5	5	0	43	41
Northeastern	–	–	–	–	–	–	–	21	11	10	0	80	70
Norwich	–	–	–	–	–	–	–	15	14	1	0	–	–
Princeton	–	–	–	–	–	–	–	15	8	7	0	66	45
St. Olaf	–	–	–	–	–	–	–	3	0	3	0	–	–
Tufts	–	–	–	–	–	–	–	13	5	8	0	–	–
Yale	–	–	–	–	–	–	–	25	17	8	0	125	112

1951–52 Midwest Collegiate Hockey League
	Conference							Overall					
	GP	W	L	T	PTS	GF	GA	GP	W	L	T	GF	GA
Colorado College†	12	10	2	0	20			25	19	5	1	168	94
Denver	12	9	3	0	18	66	40	25	18	6	1	146	94
Michigan	12	9	3	0	18	75	40	26	22	4	0	161	70
North Dakota	12	6	6	0	12	55	56	25	13	11	1	126	105
Minnesota	12	5	7	0	10			26	13	13	0	130	114
Michigan State	12	3	9	0	6			20	7	13	0	72	110
Michigan Tech	12	0	12	0	0			20	2	18	0	75	154
† indicates conference regular season champion Only the first two games played between member teams counted for conference standings.

1951–52 Minnesota Intercollegiate Athletic Conference ice hockey standings
	Conference							Overall					
	GP	W	L	T	PTS	GF	GA	GP	W	L	T	GF	GA
St. Thomas †	–	–	–	–	–	–	–	10	7	3	0	–	–
Augsburg	–	–	–	–	–	–	–	–	–	–	–	–	–
Concordia	–	–	–	–	–	–	–	7	4	3	0	–	–
Gustavus Adolphus	–	–	–	–	–	–	–	–	–	–	–	–	–
Hamline	–	–	–	–	–	–	–	–	–	–	–	–	–
Macalester	–	–	–	–	–	–	–	–	–	–	–	–	–
Minnesota–Duluth	6	0	6	0	.000	–	–	9	2	7	0	–	–
Saint John's	–	–	–	–	–	–	–	9	6	3	0	–	–
† indicates conference champion

1951–52 Tri-State League standings
	Conference							Overall					
	GP	W	L	T	PTS	GF	GA	GP	W	L	T	GF	GA
St. Lawrence†	7	6	1	0	14	58	15	20	15	5	0	136	67
Rensselaer	5	4	1	0	14	36	20	18	15	3	0	148	59
Clarkson	6	3	3	0	8	31	33	15	10	5	0	75	53
Middlebury	7	2	5	0	4			21	10	11	0	–	–
Williams	5	0	5	0	0			10	0	10	0	–	–
† indicates conference regular season champion St. Lawrence was declared as the sole champion when Rensselaer was found to have used an ineligible player during the season.

== 1952 NCAA Tournament ==
Semifinals; March 13–14
E1	St. Lawrence	3
W2	Michigan	9
W1	Colorado College	4
E2	Yale	3

National championship March 15
W2	Michigan	4
W1	Colorado College	1
Third-place game
E1	St. Lawrence	1
E2	Yale	4

Note: * denotes overtime period(s)

== Player stats ==
=== Scoring leaders ===
The following players led the league in points at the conclusion of the season.

GP = Games played; G = Goals; A = Assists; Pts = Points; PIM = Penalty minutes

Player	Class	Team	GP	G	A	Pts	PIM
Frank Chiarelli	Freshman	Rensselaer	18	55	24	79	6
Ron Hartwell	Senior	Colorado College	25	40	27	67	20
Abbie Moore	Sophomore	Rensselaer	18	31	34	65	4
John Mayasich	Freshman	Minnesota	26	32	30	62	10
Tony Frasca	Senior	Colorado College	–	24	33	57	8
Neale Langill	Freshman	St. Lawrence	18	28	27	55	–
Ambrose Mosco	Freshman	Rensselaer	14	24	31	55	10
Bob Wheeler	Senior	Brown	–	36	18	54	–
Omer Brandt	Junior	Colorado College	–	29	24	53	29
Richard Dougherty	Freshman	Minnesota	26	32	20	52	33

=== Leading goaltenders ===
The following goaltenders led the league in goals against average at the end of the regular season while playing at least 33% of their team's total minutes.

GP = Games played; Min = Minutes played; W = Wins; L = Losses; OT = Overtime/shootout losses; GA = Goals against; SO = Shutouts; SV% = Save percentage; GAA = Goals against average

Player	Class	Team	GP	Min	W	L	OT	GA	SO	SV%	GAA
Willard Ikola	Freshman	Michigan	26	-	22	4	0	70	2	-	2.69
Paul Cruikshank	Junior	Yale	-	-	-	-	-	-	-	-	2.76
Rudy Lindbeck	Senior	North Dakota	11	-	-	-	-	-	0	.927	3.00
Harris Siegel	Junior	Rensselaer	14	695	9	2	0	39	1	-	3.37
Jack Boylan	Freshman	St. Lawrence	20	1163	15	5	0	67	0	.886	3.46
George Mooney	Sophomore	Denver	15	-	11	3	1	-	0	.845	3.46
Alex Finkelstein	Sophomore	North Dakota	24	-	-	-	-	-	2	.868	4.25
Larry Ross	Junior	Minnesota	13	-	-	-	-	64	0	.840	4.90
Delmar Reid	Senior	Michigan State	15	-	-	-	-	-	-	-	5.73
Harry Taylor	Sophomore	Michigan Tech	-	-	-	-	-	-	-	.829	7.00

== Awards ==
=== NCAA ===
Award		Recipient
Spencer Penrose Award		Cheddy Thompson, Colorado College
Most Outstanding Player in NCAA Tournament		Ken Kinsley, Colorado College
AHCA All-American Teams
First Team	Position	Second Team
Ray Picard, Northeastern	G	Ken Kinsley, Colorado College
John Grocott, Dartmouth	D	Joe deBastiani, Michigan Tech
Eddie Miller, Denver	D	Jim Haas, Michigan
Tony Frasca, Colorado College	F	Omer Brandt, Colorado College
Ron Hartwell, Colorado College	F	Frank Chiarelli, Rensselaer
Bob Wheeler, Brown	F	John Mayasich, Minnesota

=== MCHL ===
No Awards

All-MCHL Teams
First Team	Position	Second Team
Ken Kinsley, Colorado College	G	Willard Ikola, Michigan
Don Burgess, Denver	D	Joe deBastiani, Michigan Tech
Eddie Miller, Denver	D	Elwood Shell, North Dakota
Tony Frasca, Colorado College	F	John Mayasich, Minnesota
Ron Hartwell, Colorado College	F	John McKennell, Michigan
Omer Brandt, Colorado College	F	Bill Abbott, Denver
