= John Matchefts =

American ice hockey player and coach

Johnny Matchefts

Biographical details
- Born: June 18, 1931; Eveleth, Minnesota
- Died: November 10, 2013 (aged 82); Colorado Springs, Colorado

Playing career
- 1950–1953: Michigan
- 1955–1956: US National Team
- Position: Center

Coaching career (HC unless noted)
- 1966–1971: Colorado College
- 1972–1974: Air Force (assistant)
- 1974–1985: Air Force

Head coaching record
- Overall: 208–238–9 (.467)

Accomplishments and honors

Championships
- 1951 NCAA National Champion; 1952 NCAA national champion 1953 NCAA national champion

Awards
- 1953 Tournament Most Outstanding Player; 1991 US Hockey Hall of Fame; 2015 University of Michigan Hall of Fame

John Peter Matchefts (June 18, 1931 – November 10, 2013) was an American ice hockey player and coach. Matchefts played for Team USA at the 1956 Winter Olympics.

== Career ==
=== Player ===
An Eveleth native from birth, Matchefts played for his hometown high school ice hockey team, earning three consecutive all-tournament team honors in his time there and helping Eveleth High School win state titles in his junior and senior years. Matchefts then moved on to Michigan, signing up to play for the national powerhouse under the charge of Vic Heyliger. After sitting out his freshman season (a normal occurrence at the time) Matchefts joined the varsity team just in time for them to win the school's second national title in 1951. The following season the Wolverines became a founding member of the MCHL and responded by posting a second consecutive 22-win season and national title. Matchefts was named team captain for his senior season and while their win total dropped to 17, the Wolverines were invited back to the NCAA tournament and after a scare against Rensselaer in the semifinals, Michigan triumphed for the third straight year, making this the only three-peat in the history of the tournament. (as of 2014) With the win Matchefts joined a very exclusive club of three time NCAA champions as a player in any sport let alone men's hockey.

After graduating in 1953 Matchefts joined the US National Team for a time, playing in both the 1955 World Ice Hockey Championships and the 1956 Olympics, earning a silver medal at Cortina d'Ampezzo before retiring as a player.

=== Coaching ===
Matchefts returned to Minnesota and spent more than a decade as the coach for both his previous high school and Thief River Falls High School before being offered the opportunity to succeed Bob Johnson as head coach at Colorado College. After a decent first season Matchefts' Tigers dropped to the bottom of the conference and stayed well below .500 for the remainder of his tenure. He was out as coach after the 1970–71 season after the school denied his request for a $200 raise.

A year later, Matchefts' joined his old college coach, Vic Heyliger, at The Air Force Academy as an assistant and eventually succeeded him in 1974–75. For the next 11 seasons, Matchefts led the airmen through ups and downs as the program established itself as a Division I Independent before retiring and turning the team over to Chuck Delich in 1984–85.

On November 10, 2013 John Matchefts died in the city where he spent so much of his coaching career, Colorado Springs.

== Career statistics ==
			Regular season					Playoffs
Season	Team	League	GP	G	A	Pts	PIM	GP	G	A	Pts	PIM
1950–51	Michigan	NCAA	—	—	—	56	—	—	—	—	—	—
1951–52	Michigan	MCHL	—	—	—	—	—	—	—	—	—	—
1952–53	Michigan	MCHL	24	15	33	48	—	—	—	—	—	—
NCAA totals			—	—	—	—	—	—	—	—	—	—

== Head coaching record ==
Record table
Season	Team	Overall	Conference	Standing	Postseason
Colorado College Tigers (WCHA) (1966–1971)
1966-67	Colorado College	15-13-1	6-12-0	7th	WCHA first round
1967-68	Colorado College	9-20-0	4-16-0	7th	WCHA first round
1968-69	Colorado College	12-16-0	4-14-0	7th	WCHA West Regional finals
1969-70	Colorado College	7-22-1	3-17-0	9th	
1970-71	Colorado College	11-17-1	7-11-0	8th	WCHA West Regional semifinals
Colorado College:		54-88-3	24-70-0		
Air Force Falcons Independent (1974–1985)
1974-75	Air Force	24-5-1			
1975-76	Air Force	16-10-0			
1976-77	Air Force	20-7-0			
1977-78	Air Force	9-17-0			
1978-79	Air Force	18-12-1			
1979-80	Air Force	15-16-0			
1980-81	Air Force	13-13-0			
1981-82	Air Force	12-17-1			
1982-83	Air Force	5-23-0			
1983-84	Air Force	8-16-2			
1984-85	Air Force	14-14-1			
Air Force:		154-150-6			
Total:		208-238-9			
National champion Postseason invitational champion Conference regular season champion Conference regular season and conference tournament champion Division regular season champion Division regular season and conference tournament champion Conference tournament champion

== Awards and honors ==
Olympic medal record

Men's Ice hockey

Representing United States
Silver medal – second place	1956 Cortina d'Ampezzo	Ice hockey

October 1991 Induction into US Hockey Hall of Fame as a player.

September 2015 inducted into University of Michigan Hall of Honor

Award	Year
All-NCAA All-Tournament First Team	1951, 1953
All-MCHL Second Team	1952–53

Awards and achievements
Preceded by Ken Kinsley	NCAA Tournament Most Outstanding Player; 1953	Succeeded by Abbie Moore
Preceded by Murray Armstrong	WCHA Coach of the Year; 1968–69	Succeeded by Glen Sonmor
