= Abbie Moore =

Canadian ice hockey player

- Born: Ottawa, Ontario, Canada
- Position: Center
- Played for: Rensselaer
- Playing career: 1951–1954

Albert W. "Abbie" Moore is a Canadian retired ice hockey center who was the MOP for the 1954 NCAA Tournament.

== Career ==
Abbie Moore was in the second recruit class for Ned Harkness after Rensselaer brought back its ice hockey program in 1949. After sitting out his freshman season (a common practice as the NCAA restricted students to just three years of varsity play) Moore exploded onto the scene in 1951. Teamed with Frank Chiarelli and Ambrose Mosco, Moore centered one of the most potent scoring lines in college hockey. In just 18 games Moore scored 31 goals and 34 assists, and finished third in the nation in scoring. RPI tripled its win total from the year before and narrowly missed out on its first NCAA Tournament appearance. The following year Moore was named team captain with Herb LaFontaine and produced almost identical numbers as RPI won the Tri-State League and received the top eastern seed. Rensselaer lost a close match with Minnesota in the semifinal with Moore being held scoreless, but he made up for it in the consolation game by scoring 4 unassisted goals, an NCAA tournament record, and earned a spot on the NCAA All-Tournament First Team. he finished the year second in the nation in scoring.

In his senior season More was again a star for his team. Though his scoring output diminished slightly he led the Bachelors in scoring for the second straight season and led RPI to another conference championship (tied). While there was some surprise that Rensselaer was selected for the tournament in 1954 Moore were prepared for the task ahead of them and defeated three-time defending champion Michigan in the semifinal. Moore was again held scoreless but in the championship game against the Golden Gophers he started the scoring and added an assist at the beginning of the second period. Minnesota fought back and scored four consecutive goals to take the lead mid-way through the third but Moore notched his second goal of the game with under four minutes to play and regulation ended in a 4–4 tie. Rensselaer scored the winning goal at the beginning of overtime and gave the school its first NCAA Championship. Moore was tabbed as the Tournament MOP but, curiously, was not selected for the All-Tournament First Team. As of 2020 he remains the only player to possess such a distinction.

Moore finished his career at Rensselaer with 102 goals and 206 points in just 61 games. As of 2020 he was 4th in career goals, 9th in career assists and 7th in career points for the Engineers. He sits second in goals per game and assists per game but is the all-time leader in points per game for RPI with 3.38. Moore never played organized hockey after winning the championship and was eventually inducted into the RPI Athletic Hall of Fame.

== Statistics ==
=== Regular season and playoffs ===
			Regular season					Playoffs
Season	Team	League	GP	G	A	Pts	PIM	GP	G	A	Pts	PIM
1951–52	Rensselaer	Tri-State League	18	31	34	65	4	—	—	—	—	—
1952–53	Rensselaer	Tri-State League	20	35	38	73	4	—	—	—	—	—
1953–54	Rensselaer	Tri-State League	23	36	32	68	14	—	—	—	—	—
NCAA totals			61	102	104	206	22	—	—	—	—	—

== Awards and honors ==
Award	Year
NCAA All-Tournament First Team	1953
AHCA Second Team All-American	1953–54
NCAA All-Tournament Second Team	1954

Awards and achievements
Preceded by John Matchefts	NCAA Tournament Most Outstanding Player; 1954	Succeeded by Phil Hilton
