= Herb LaFontaine =

Canadian ice hockey player

- Born: Westmount, Quebec, CAN
- Height: 6 ft 0 in (183 cm)
- Weight: 190 lb (86 kg; 13 st 8 lb)
- Position: Defenceman
- Shot: Right
- Played for: Rensselaer
- Playing career: 1951–1953

Herb LaFontaine is a Canadian retired ice hockey defenceman who starred for Rensselaer.

== Career ==
LaFontaine played two seasons for Rensselaer as the team was ascending to the top of the college hockey landscape. In each of his two campaigns, the Engineers finished atop the Tri-State League standings and ended the year with 15 wins. For his second year with the program LaFontaine was named team captain and he led the Engineers to their first NCAA Tournament appearance. RPI lost a close contest with Minnesota in the semifinal then defeated Boston College in the consolation game. For his performance during the season, LaFontaine was an AHCA First Team All-American and made the All-Tournament Second Team.

== Statistics ==
=== Regular season and playoffs ===
			Regular season					Playoffs
Season	Team	League	GP	G	A	Pts	PIM	GP	G	A	Pts	PIM
1951–52	Rensselaer	Tri-State	18	4	12	16	34	—	—	—	—	—
1952–53	Rensselaer	Tri-State	20	6	12	18	22	—	—	—	—	—
NCAA totals			38	10	24	34	56	—	—	—	—	—

== Awards and honors ==
Award	Year
AHCA First Team All-American	1952–53
NCAA All-Tournament Second Team	1953
