= Jim Haas (ice hockey) =

Canadian ice hockey player (born 1933)

- Born: November 29, 1929 Nipawin, Saskatchewan, Canada
- Died: November 28, 2015
- Position: Defenseman/Forward
- Played for: Michigan
- Playing career: 1951–1954

James Haas (November 29, 1929 – September 28, 2015) was a Canadian ice hockey defenseman and forward who won consecutive National Championships with Michigan in the 1950s.

== Career ==
After playing Junior hockey for Moose Jaw and Prince Albert, Haas was recruited to Michigan and joined one of the premier powers of college hockey. While Haas played for the freshman team, the varsity squad won the 1951 Championship. Haas joined the following year and performed brilliantly, helping Michigan hold opponents to just 66 goals in 24 games, by far the lowest total of any team in the MCHL. He was named to the All-MCHL First Team and was an AHCA Second Team All-American. in his first tournament Haas collected two assists and made the All-Tournament First Team as Michigan won its second consecutive championship.

The following year Haas didn't perform as well on the defensive end and, as a consequence, Michigan's defense wasn't as impenetrable, but the Wolverines were still able to return to the tournament. This time it was Michigan's offense that carried them through and after demolishing Boston University 14–2 in the semifinal, Hass got in on the scoring in the championship match against Minnesota, scoring two goals and an assist in the Wolverines' 7–3 win, securing a third consecutive championship. For his senior season, Haas was named team captain and was once more a star during the season. While Michigan finished far back of Minnesota in the standings, Haas was still recognized by making appearances on the first team for both his conference and the nation. Haas led Michigan back to the tournament, seeking a fourth straight championship, but in the first game the Wolverines were stunned by upstart Rensselaer who skated rings around the larger Wolverines and knocked the maize and blue out of contention. After trashing their hotel room that night, Michigan took their frustration out on Boston College in the consolation game, winning 7–2 and finishing in third place.

Haas graduated with a degree in geology in 1954 and then moved to Alberta where he coached bantam hockey for several years. He was inducted into the Michigan Dekers Hall of Fame in 1977.

== Statistics ==
=== Regular season and playoffs ===
| | | | Regular season | | | | | Playoffs |
| Season | Team | League | GP | G | A | Pts | PIM | GP | G | A | Pts | PIM |
|---|---|---|---|---|---|---|---|---|---|---|---|---|
| 1951–52 | Michigan | MCHL | 26 | 6 | 16 | 22 | 37 | — | — | — | — | — |
| 1952–53 | Michigan | MCHL | 24 | 7 | 16 | 23 | 16 | — | — | — | — | — |
| 1953–54 | Michigan | WIHL | 23 | 10 | 8 | 18 | 28 | — | — | — | — | — |
| NCAA totals | | | 73 | 23 | 40 | 63 | 81 | — | — | — | — | — |

== Awards and honors ==
| Award | Year |
|---|---|
| All-MCHL First Team | 1951–52 |
| AHCA Second Team All-American | 1951–52 |
| NCAA All-Tournament First Team | 1952 |
| All-WIHL First Team | 1953–54 |
| AHCA Second Team All-American | 1953–54 |
| NCAA All-Tournament Second Team | 1954 |
