= Doug Binning =

Canadian ice hockey player

- Born: February 12, 1930 Montreal, Quebec, CAN
- Died: February 15, 2011 (aged 81)
- Position: Defenceman
- Played for: Middlebury
- Playing career: 1950–1954

Douglas John Binning was a Canadian ice hockey defenceman who won a Memorial Cup in 1950 and later starred for Middlebury.

== Career ==
Binning played for the Montreal Junior Canadiens, then a feeder team for Montreal Canadiens, and helped the team win the 1950 Memorial Cup. The team included several future NHL players such as Charlie Hodge, Don Marshall and Dickie Moore. After winning the championship, Binning was able to continue playing hockey when he started attending Middlebury College. Because the team did not bother to support a freshman team Binning joined the varsity squad from the start and played four years for the program. The Panthers were a founding member of the Tri-State League for Binning's first season and the team finished the year with a remarkable 13–1 record and tied for the conference lead. The league, however, did not allow two teams to win its championship and Middlebury played the first conference playoff game in the history of NCAA hockey. Unfortunately, the team lost 3–16. For the remainder of Binning's time at Middlebury the team never challenged for the league title, but Binning himself was recognized as one of the best defensemen in college hockey with his selection as an AHCA First Team All-American in 1953.

After graduating Binning embarked on a long career in the flooring industry while coaching and refereeing several sports in his free time.

== Awards and honors ==
Award	Year
AHCA First Team All-American	1952–53
AHCA Second Team All-American	1953–54
