= 1952–53 NCAA men's ice hockey season =

- Duration: November 1952– March 14, 1953
- NCAA tournament: 1953
- National championship: Broadmoor Ice Palace; Colorado Springs, Colorado
- NCAA champion: Michigan

The 1952–53 NCAA men's ice hockey season began in November 1952 and concluded with the 1953 NCAA Men's Ice Hockey Tournament's championship game on March 14, 1953, at the Broadmoor Ice Palace in Colorado Springs, Colorado. This was the 6th season in which an NCAA ice hockey championship was held and is the 59th year overall where an NCAA school fielded a team.

== Regular season ==
=== Season tournaments ===
Tournament	Dates	Teams	Champion
Beanpot	December 26–27	4	Harvard
Rensselaer Holiday Tournament	January 1–3	4	Princeton

=== Standings ===
1952–53 NCAA Independent ice hockey standings
	Intercollegiate							Overall					
	GP	W	L	T	Pct.	GF	GA	GP	W	L	T	GF	GA
Amherst	–	–	–	–	–	–	–	11	5	6	0	–	–
American International	–	–	–	–	–	–	–	16	9	6	1	–	–
Army	13	5	8	0	.385	42	56	16	8	8	0	56	64
Boston College	–	–	–	–	–	–	–	16	11	4	1	71	41
Boston University	22	14	7	1	.659	117	86	22	14	7	1	117	86
Bowdoin	–	–	–	–	–	–	–	11	4	7	0	–	–
Brown	–	–	–	–	–	–	–	17	6	11	0	67	83
Colby	–	–	–	–	–	–	–	8	2	6	0	–	–
Dartmouth	–	–	–	–	–	–	–	23	9	14	0	84	90
Hamilton	–	–	–	–	–	–	–	10	0	10	0	–	–
Harvard	–	–	–	–	–	–	–	17	11	5	1	79	49
Lehigh	0	0	0	0	-	0	0	3	2	1	0	15	17
MIT	–	–	–	–	–	–	–	12	3	9	0	–	–
New Hampshire	–	–	–	–	–	–	–	9	3	6	0	27	49
Northeastern	–	–	–	–	–	–	–	21	9	10	2	64	70
Norwich	–	–	–	–	–	–	–	14	11	2	1	–	–
Princeton	–	–	–	–	–	–	–	18	11	7	0	66	49
Providence	–	–	–	–	–	–	–	14	6	8	0	66	79
St. Olaf	–	–	–	–	–	–	–	7	0	7	0	–	–
Tufts	–	–	–	–	–	–	–	18	10	8	0	–	–
Yale	–	–	–	–	–	–	–	20	12	8	0	85	56

1952–53 Midwest Collegiate Hockey League
	Conference							Overall					
	GP	W	L	T	PTS	GF	GA	GP	W	L	T	GF	GA
Minnesota†	20	16	4	0	19	92	46	29	23	6	0	149	74
Michigan†	16	12	4	0	19	91	49	24	17	7	0	139	71
North Dakota	16	11	5	0	17	82	59	20	15	5	0	109	68
Denver	16	10	6	0	15	70	54	24	17	6	1	142	79
Colorado College	14	4	10	0	8	52	86	20	9	11	0	98	106
Michigan Tech	16	3	13	0	4	53	94	19	6	13	0	75	100
Michigan State	18	2	16	0	2	45	94	22	5	16	1	74	104
† indicates conference regular season champion

1952–53 Minnesota Intercollegiate Athletic Conference ice hockey standings
	Conference							Overall					
	GP	W	L	T	PTS	GF	GA	GP	W	L	T	GF	GA
Minnesota–Duluth †	7	6	1	0	.857	–	–	12	9	3	0	–	–
St. Thomas †	–	–	–	–	–	–	–	15	12	3	0	–	–
Augsburg	–	–	–	–	–	–	–	–	–	–	–	–	–
Concordia	–	–	–	–	–	–	–	–	–	–	–	–	–
Gustavus Adolphus	–	–	–	–	–	–	–	8	0	8	0	–	–
Hamline	–	–	–	–	–	–	–	–	–	–	–	–	–
Macalester	–	–	–	–	–	–	–	–	–	–	–	–	–
Saint John's	–	–	–	–	–	–	–	11	2	9	0	–	–
† indicates conference champion

1952–53 Tri-State League standings
	Conference							Overall					
	GP	W	L	T	PTS	GF	GA	GP	W	L	T	GF	GA
Rensselaer†	5	4	0	1	11	23	13	20	15	4	1	124	45
St. Lawrence	5	3	2	0	8	23	14	18	12	6	0	105	50
Clarkson	5	1	3	1	5	14	29	19	9	9	1	88	94
Middlebury	3	0	3	0	0	8	11	16	10	6	0	–	–
† indicates conference regular season champion

== 1953 NCAA Tournament ==
Semifinals; March 12–13
W1	Minnesota	3
E2	Rensselaer	2
E1	Boston University	2
W2	Michigan	14

National championship March 14
W1	Minnesota	3
W2	Michigan	7
Third-place game
E1	Boston University	3
E2	Rensselaer	6

Note: * denotes overtime period(s)

== Player stats ==
=== Scoring leaders ===
The following players led the league in points at the conclusion of the season.

GP = Games played; G = Goals; A = Assists; Pts = Points; PIM = Penalty minutes

Player	Class	Team	GP	G	A	Pts	PIM
John Mayasich	Sophomore	Minnesota	27	42	36	78	16
Abbie Moore	Junior	Rensselaer	20	35	38	73	4
Frank Chiarelli	Sophomore	Rensselaer	20	36	32	68	8
Richard Dougherty	Sophomore	Minnesota	27	35	32	67	35
Richard Rodenhiser	Junior	Boston University	22	29	20	49	12
John Matchefts	Senior	Michigan	24	18	30	48	24
George Chin	Junior	Michigan	24	20	27	47	0
Bill Abbott	Sophomore	Denver	-	27	18	45	-
Gene Campbell	Sophomore	Minnesota	26	21	24	45	16
Ben Cherski	Sophomore	North Dakota	20	30	14	44	10

=== Leading goaltenders ===
The following goaltenders led the league in goals against average at the end of the regular season while playing at least 33% of their team's total minutes.

GP = Games played; Min = Minutes played; W = Wins; L = Losses; OT = Overtime/shootout losses; GA = Goals against; SO = Shutouts; SV% = Save percentage; GAA = Goals against average

Player	Class	Team	GP	Min	W	L	OT	GA	SO	SV%	GAA
Bob Fox	Sophomore	Rensselaer	20	1182	15	4	1	45	2	-	2.28
Jim Mattson	Sophomore	Minnesota	27	1627	22	5	0	64	4	.910	2.36
Richard Whelan	Sophomore	Yale	-	-	-	-	-	-	-	-	2.62
Bill Sloan	Freshman	St. Lawrence	18	1058	12	6	0	50	1	.894	2.83
Walter Morin	Senior	Denver	-	-	16	5	1	-	0	.866	3.05
Alex Finkelstein	Junior	North Dakota	20	-	15	5	0	-	1	.884	3.40
Gerald Bergin	Junior	Michigan State	14	-	-	-	-	-	-	-	5.28

== Awards ==
=== NCAA ===
Award		Recipient
Spencer Penrose Award		John Mariucci, Minnesota
Most Outstanding Player in NCAA Tournament		John Matchefts, Michigan
AHCA All-American Team
Player	Pos	Team
Jim Mattson	G	Minnesota
Ray Picard	G	Northeastern
Doug Binning	D	Middlebury
Herb LaFontaine	D	Rensselaer
Alex MacLellan	D	Michigan
Bob Monahan	D	Michigan Tech
Hank Bothfeld	F	Princeton
Wellington Burtnett	F	Boston College
Ben Cherski	F	North Dakota
Frank Chiarelli	F	Rensselaer
John Mayasich	F	Minnesota
Richard Rodenhiser	F	Boston University

=== MCHL ===
No Awards

All-MCHL Teams
First Team	Position	Second Team
Jim Mattson, Minnesota	G	Willard Ikola, Michigan
Tom Wegleitner, Minnesota	D	Alex MacLellan, Michigan
Eddie Miller, Denver	D	Elwood Shell, North Dakota
Ben Cherski, North Dakota	F	Gene Campbell, Minnesota
Richard Dougherty, Minnesota	F	John Matchefts, Michigan
John Mayasich, Minnesota	F	Bill Abbott, Denver
	F	Joe deBastiani, Michigan Tech
