= Ben Cherski =

Canadian ice hockey player

- Born: October 29, 1929 Edmonton, Alberta, Canada
- Died: May 29, 2017 (aged 87) California, United States
- Position: Center
- Played for: Univ. of North Dakota
- Playing career: 1951–1955

Ben Cherski (October 29, 1929 – May 19, 2017) was a Canadian ice hockey player. He played from 1951 to 1955 at the University of North Dakota. He was three times an All-American in ice hockey and holds a record of seven hat tricks in one season (1953–54 season) and 17 all-time. He has 188 points all-time in his career. In 1978, he was inducted into the University of North Dakota Letterwinners Association Hall of Fame. He died in California in 2017.

== Awards and honors ==
Award	Year	Notes
All-MCHL First Team	1952–53	
AHCA First Team All-American	1952–53	
All-WIHL First Team	1953–54	
AHCA First Team All-American	1953–54	
