= Frank Chiarelli =

Canadian ice hockey player (1931–2024)

- Born: September 21, 1931 Ottawa, Ontario, Canada
- Died: July 26, 2024 (aged 92)
- Height: 5 ft 8 in (173 cm)
- Weight: 161 lb (73 kg; 11 st 7 lb)
- Position: Forward
- Played for: Rensselaer Engineers; Wembley Lions; Hull-Ottawa Canadiens
- NHL draft: Undrafted
- Playing career: 1951–1960

Frank Chiarelli (September 21, 1931 – July 26, 2024) was a Canadian ice hockey player. He captained Rensselaer to its first US college national title in 1954 and was the all-time NCAA leader in career goals at the time of his graduation.

== Career ==
Like many Canadian players of the era, Chiarelli began his college career in 1951 as an over-aged freshman. He played for Rensselaer despite the NCAA having a policy restricting all players to three years of varsity play and had an immediate impact for the Engineers. In just 18 games, Chiarelli scored 55 goals and breaking the NCAA single-season record. He became the first freshman to lead the NCAA in both goals and points. Rensselaer's hockey program improved in his first season, going from 5–10 the year before to 15–3. However the team only managed to finish second in the Tri-State League and missed out on the NCAA tournament.

In his sophomore season Chiarelli's scoring declined but the team was able to finish atop their conference and make the first NCAA appearance in school history. The Engineers were predicted to finish in the bottom two but performed well against Minnesota in the semifinal (losing 2-3) before winning the consolation game. The next year Chiarelli, was named as the team captain and, while his numbers dipped again, the team tied St. Lawrence for the Tri-State League title and the NCAA committee named RPI to the tournament.

In his final attempt at an NCAA championship, Chiarelli led RPI against three-time defending champion Michigan and pulled off one of the biggest upsets in tournament history. The following night in their first championship appearance, Rensselaer was facing a Minnesota team that had just set an NCAA record with a 14–1 win in their semifinal game. Rensselaer scored the first three goals of the game, including one from Chiarelli. Minnesota came back with four consecutive goals. With under four minutes left in the game, Chiarelli passed the puck to Abbie Moore who scored tied the game. In the overtime period, Rensselaer's second line scored the game-winner.

Chiarelli played in 19 of Rensselaer's 22 games in his senior season, the fourth consecutive where's both his goal and point totals diminished. By the end of the 1954–55 season Chiarelli's 155 career goals were an NCAA record and this record stood for five seasons. As of 2019, Chiarelli still has the third-most goals of any NCAA player ever and sits second in terms of goals per game and points per game (behind only Phil Latreille). After graduating Chiarelli played for the Wembley Lions of the short-lived British National League. He then played for three teams over three season in the Ontario Senior League before ending his career with 63 games for the Hull-Ottawa Canadiens in another short-lived league, the EPHL.

In addition to hockey, Chiarelli also played baseball for the Engineers.

== Personal life and death ==
Chiarelli was the son of Antonia (née Lorello) and Eugenio Chiarelli, an immigrant from Cleto, Calabria, Italy, who owned a grocery store and butcher shop in Ottawa's Little Italy neighbourhood. Frank was the first in the family to be born in Canada.

Chiarelli spent most of his post-hockey career as a high school teacher in Ottawa. He was also the first coach of the Nepean Raiders, and built the Riverbend golf course in Richmond, Ontario.

Chiarelli's son Peter played college hockey at Harvard before going onto a long career as an executive in the NHL. His brother Bob served as mayor of Ottawa from 2001 to 2006.

Chiarelli died on July 26, 2024, at the age of 92.

== Career statistics ==
			Regular season					Playoffs
Season	Team	League	GP	G	A	Pts	PIM	GP	G	A	Pts	PIM
1951–52	Rensselaer	NCAA	18	55	24	79	6	—	—	—	—	—
1952–53	Rensselaer	NCAA	20	36	32	68	8	—	—	—	—	—
1953–54	Rensselaer	NCAA	23	35	27	63	21	—	—	—	—	—
1954–55	Rensselaer	NCAA	19	29	27	56	8	—	—	—	—	—
NCAA totals			80	155	110	265	43	—	—	—	—	—

== Awards and honours ==
Award	Year
AHCA Second Team All-American	1951–52
AHCA All-American	1952–53
NCAA All-Tournament Second Team	1953
AHCA Second Team All-American	1953–54
NCAA All-Tournament First Team	1954

Awards and achievements
Preceded by Neil Celley	NCAA Ice Hockey Scoring Champion; 1951–52	Succeeded by John Mayasich
Sporting positions
Preceded by Jack Garrity	NCAA Single-Season Goals Leader; 1952–1959	Succeeded by Phil Latreille
Preceded by Ron Hartwell	NCAA Career Goals Leader; 1954–1960	Succeeded by Phil Latreille
