= Spike Schultz =

Canadian ice hockey player

- Born: Edmonton, Alberta, Canada
- Position: Goaltender
- Played for: North Dakota
- Playing career: 1953–1955

Gerald "Spike" Schultz is a Canadian retired ice hockey goaltender who set the NCAA record for consecutive shutouts during his first season as the starter for North Dakota.

== Career ==
Schultz was the Fighting Sioux's main goaltender for the 1953–54 season. While the team finished with a middling record (14–12–1) the highlight of the season was a 4-game stretch in January where Spike Schultz could not be beaten. A scheduling quirk had North Dakota play Michigan Tech in four consecutive games over a three-week period. Because Tech was the worst team in the WIHL that season the Sioux had a good chance to climb in the standings, but no one could have predicted that the Huskies wouldn't be able to score a single goal. Spike Schultz turned aside every puck that came his way for four games, setting a new NCAA record for consecutive shutouts (4). His shutout streak wasn't much longer than those four contests and ended at 249:41. While the NCAA had only officially recognized ice hockey as a sport for seven seasons at that point, Schultz' record stood for over 50 years until Blaine Lacher strung 5 straight goose-eggs together and shattered the shutout streak by over 125 minutes.

Schultz' astounding performance earned him a spot on the AHCA First Team All-American. Outside that remarkable performance, however, Schultz had a rather pedestrian career in net for North Dakota; he allowed over 4 goals per game and had only one other shutout in two seasons.

== Statistics ==
=== Regular season and playoffs ===
| | | | Regular season | | | | | | | | | Playoffs |
| Season | Team | League | GP | W | L | T | MIN | GA | SO | GAA | SV% | GP | W | L | MIN | GA | SO | GAA | SV% |
|---|---|---|---|---|---|---|---|---|---|---|---|---|---|---|---|---|---|---|---|
| 1953–54 | North Dakota | WIHL | 27 | — | — | — | — | — | 4 | 3.54 | .898 | — | — | — | — | — | — | — | — |
| 1954–55 | North Dakota | WIHL | 23 | — | — | — | — | — | 1 | 3.50 | .888 | — | — | — | — | — | — | — | — |
| NCAA totals | | | 50 | 23 | 23 | 2 | 2939 | 193 | 5 | 3.94 | .879 | — | — | — | — | — | — | — | — |

== Awards and honors ==
| Award | Year |
|---|---|
| All-WIHL Second Team | 1953–54 |
| AHCA First Team All-American | 1953–54 |
