= Joe deBastiani =

Canadian ice hockey player

- Born: December 10, 1922 Cobalt, Ontario, CAN
- Died: June 7, 2010 (aged 87) Mexico City, MEX
- Position: Defenceman/Center
- Played for: Michigan Tech
- National team: Canada
- Playing career: 1948–1953
Medal record
World Championship
Silver medal – second place	1949 Stockholm	Ice hockey

Joseph "Joe" DeBastiani was a Canadian ice hockey Defenceman and center who played for Michigan Tech in the early 1950s.

== Career ==
Born Giuseppe Antonio deBastiani to Pietro and Augusta, immigrants from Veneto, Joe grew up in Ontario. After graduating from Haileybury Mining School, deBastiani worked in the mines for a year or so before taking part in the 1949 Ice Hockey World Championships and was regarded as one of the best wingers in the tournament. The following year he began attending Michigan College of Mining and Technology and, after sitting out his freshman season (a common practice at the time), Joe joined the ice hockey team in 1950. He led the team in scoring as a sophomore and was selected as an AHCA First Team All-American in 1950–51.

The following year Michigan Tech became a founding member of the Midwest Collegiate Hockey League (a forerunner of the WCHA) and while deBastiani performed well, the team could find no success and lost all 12 of their conference games. deBastiani was selected as team captain for his senior season and helped the team to a modest improvement for which he was selected as team MVP. In addition, deBastiani switched from his usual position at defence to center for his final campaign with the team. As a result, deBastiani is the first person to be selected to two different positions for the All–MCHA Teams.

deBastiani graduated with a degree in mechanical engineering and began working in that field after leaving Michigan Tech but after a year he had grown bored with the job and returned to mining. in 1954 he went to work for Eagle-Picher in Parral, Mexico. He met his wife there and in 1961 he moved south to Querétaro after starting his own contracting company. deBastiani eventually returned to Parral where he resided until dying in 2010 at the age of 80.

deBastiani was inducted into the Michigan Tech athletic hall of fame in 2000.

== Statistics ==
=== Regular season and playoffs ===
			Regular season					Playoffs
Season	Team	League	GP	G	A	Pts	PIM	GP	G	A	Pts	PIM
1949	Canada	WC	7	7	2	9	2	—	—	—	—	—
1950–51	Michigan Tech	NCAA	—	13	11	24	—	—	—	—	—	—
1951–52	Michigan Tech	MCHA	—	7	13	20	—	—	—	—	—	—
1952–53	Michigan Tech	MCHA	—	12	14	26	10	—	—	—	—	—
NCAA totals			—	32	38	70	10	—	—	—	—	—

== Awards and honors ==
Award	Year
AHCA First Team All-American	1950–51
All-MCHL Second Team	1951–52
AHCA Second Team All-American	1951–52
All-MCHL Second Team	1952–53
Michigan Tech Athletic Hall of Fame	2010
