= Ken Yackel =

American ice hockey player and coach (1930–1991)

- Born: March 5, 1930 Saint Paul, Minnesota, U.S.
- Died: July 12, 1991 (aged 61)
- Height: 5 ft 11 in (180 cm)
- Weight: 194 lb (88 kg; 13 st 12 lb)
- Position: Right wing
- Shot: Left
- Played for: Boston Bruins
- Playing career: 1950–1964
Medal record
Men's ice hockey
Representing United States
Olympic Games
Silver medal – second place	1952 Oslo	Team competition
- Coaching career

Biographical details
- Education: University of Minnesota

Playing career
- 1952–1956: Minnesota
- Position: Right wing

Coaching career (HC unless noted)
- 1960–1963: Minneapolis Millers
- 1971–1972: Minnesota

Head coaching record
- Overall: 7–17–0 (.292)

Kenneth James Yackel (March 5, 1930 – July 12, 1991) was an American ice hockey player. Yackel played for the American national team at the 1952 Winter Olympics. He briefly played professionally in the National Hockey League, appearing in six games with the Boston Bruins in 1959, the second American-developed player to appear in the NHL during the 1950s. He was briefly the head coach for Minnesota Gophers during the 1971–72 season, serving in an interim capacity after Glen Sonmor resigned mid-year. Yackel was inducted into the United States Hockey Hall of Fame in 1986.

== Career statistics ==
=== Regular season and playoffs ===
			Regular season					Playoffs
Season	Team	League	GP	G	A	Pts	PIM	GP	G	A	Pts	PIM
1948–49	St. Paul Parkland High School	HS-MN	—	—	—	—	—	—	—	—	—	—
1950–51	St. Paul Koppys	AAHL	24	15	14	29	55	—	—	—	—	—
1951–52	University of Minnesota	MCHL	10	10	10	20	20	—	—	—	—	—
1951–52	United States National Team	Intl	—	—	—	—	—	—	—	—	—	—
1952–53	University of Minnesota	MCHL	27	10	16	26	40	—	—	—	—	—
1953–54	University of Minnesota	WIHL	27	11	17	28	62	—	—	—	—	—
1954–55	University of Minnesota	WIHL	28	18	18	36	51	—	—	—	—	—
1955–56	University of Minnesota	WIHL	30	31	27	58	102	—	—	—	—	—
1955–56	Cleveland Barons	AHL	3	0	1	1	0	—	—	—	—	—
1956–57	St. Paul Peters	CHL	—	—	—	—	—	—	—	—	—	—
1956–57	Minneapolis Bungalows	USCHL	—	15	10	25	—	—	—	—	—	—
1957–58	Saskatoon Regals/Saint Paul Saints	WHL	21	12	8	20	30	—	—	—	—	—
1958–59	Providence Reds	AHL	66	16	33	49	83	—	—	—	—	—
1958–59	Boston Bruins	NHL	6	0	0	0	2	2	0	0	0	2
1959–60	Providence Reds	AHL	57	14	21	35	58	5	2	1	3	16
1960–61	Minneapolis Millers	IHL	72	40	74	114	102	8	5	2	7	8
1961–62	Minneapolis Millers	IHL	66	50	48	98	103	5	1	3	4	13
1962–63	Minneapolis Millers	IHL	70	40	60	100	70	21	7	11	18	12
1963–64	Muskegon Zephyrs	IHL	1	0	0	0	0	—	—	—	—	—
IHL totals			209	130	182	312	275	34	13	16	29	33
NHL totals			6	0	0	0	2	2	0	0	0	2

=== International ===
Year	Team	Event	GP	G	A	Pts	PIM
1952	United States	OLY	5	1	3	4	4
Senior totals			8	6	3	9	13

== Head coaching record ==
=== College ===
Record table
Season	Team	Overall	Conference	Standing	Postseason
Minnesota Golden Gophers (WCHA / Big Ten) (1971–1972)
1971–72	Minnesota	7–17–0†	6–14–0 / 3–5–0†	10th / 4th	
Minnesota:		7–17–0	6–14–0 / 3–5–0		
Total:		7–17–0			
National champion Postseason invitational champion Conference regular season champion Conference regular season and conference tournament champion Division regular season champion Division regular season and conference tournament champion Conference tournament champion

†Yackel replaced Glen Sonmor in December 1971

== Awards and honors ==
Award	Year
All-WIHL First Team	1953–54
AHCA First Team All-American	1953–54
All-NCAA All-Tournament First Team	1954
All-WIHL First Team	1954–55
AHCA First Team All-American	1954–55
All-WIHL First Team	1955–56
AHCA Second team all-american	1955–56
