= 1954 NCAA men's ice hockey tournament =

College ice hockey tournament

- Teams: 4
- Finals site: Broadmoor Ice Palace, Colorado Springs, Colorado
- Champions: Rensselaer Bachelors (1st title)
- Runner-up: Minnesota Golden Gophers (2nd title game)
- Semifinalists: Michigan Wolverines (7th Frozen Four); Boston College Eagles (4th Frozen Four)
- Winning coach: Ned Harkness (1st title)
- MOP: Abbie Moore (Rensselaer)
- Attendance: 7,800

The 1954 NCAA Division I men's ice hockey tournament was the culmination of the 1953–54 NCAA men's ice hockey season, the seventh such tournament in NCAA history. It was held between March 11 and 13, 1954, and concluded with Rensselaer defeating Minnesota 5-4 in overtime. All games were played at the Broadmoor Ice Palace in Colorado Springs, Colorado.

This was the first championship game to go into overtime.

Rensselaer's title was the only championship won by a team from the Tri-State League. Despite its low membership the Tri-State League would send at least one representative to the tournament every year from 1952 through 1964 before being dissolved in 1972.

Minnesota's victory in the semifinal over Boston College holds two separate records: the most goals scored by one team in an NCAA tournament game (14, tied with Michigan in 1953) and the largest single-game margin of victory in an NCAA tournament (+13).

Boston College, by being outscored 3-21 in their two games, also holds the worst single-tournament goal differential (-18). (as of 2016)

== Qualifying teams ==
Four teams qualified for the tournament, two each from the eastern and western regions. The two best WIHL teams and a Tri-State League representative received bids into the tournament as did one independent school.

East							West						
Seed	School	Conference	Record	Berth type	Appearance	Last bid	Seed	School	Conference	Record	Berth type	Appearance	Last bid
1	Boston College	Independent	17–2–0	At-Large	4th	1950	1	Michigan	WIHL	14–5–2	At-Large	7th	1953
2	Rensselaer	Tri-State League	16–5–0	At-Large	2nd	1953	2	Minnesota	WIHL	22–5–1	At-Large	2nd	1953

== Format ==
The eastern team judged as better was seeded as the top eastern team while the WIHL champion was given the top western seed. The second eastern seed was slotted to play the top western seed and vice versa. All games were played at the Broadmoor Ice Palace. All matches were Single-game eliminations with the semifinal winners advancing to the national championship game and the losers playing in a consolation game.

== Bracket ==
Semifinals; March 11–12
E1	Boston College	1
W2	Minnesota	14
W1	Michigan	4
E2	Rensselaer	6

National championship March 13
W2	Minnesota	4
E2	Rensselaer	5*
Third-place game
W1	Michigan	7
E1	Boston College	2

Note: * denotes overtime period(s)

== Results ==
=== Semifinals ===
==== Minnesota vs. Boston College ====
March 11	Minnesota	14 – 1	Boston College	Broadmoor Ice Palace	Recap
(Dougherty, Yackel) John Mayasich - 00:41 (McKenzie) Bob Meredith - GW - 01:25 (unassisted) George Jetty - PP - 07:50 (Dougherty) Gene Campbell - PP - 08:19 (Mayasich) Gene Campbell - 11:54 (Campbell) John Mayasich - 16:55		First period	No scoring
(unassisted) Ken Yackel - 02:17 (Mayasich) Gene Campbell - 07:20 (Campbell) Dick Dougherty - 10:22		Second period	04:13 - Francis Quinn (Cisternelli)
(unassisted) Dick Dougherty - 05:06 (unassisted) John Mayasich - 07:47 (Mayasich) Wendall Anderson - 07:47 (unassisted) Dick Dougherty - 17:11 (Mayasich, Campbell) Dick Dougherty - PP - 19:41		Third period	No scoring
Jim Mattson		Goalie stats

==== Michigan vs. Rensselaer ====
March 12	Michigan	4 – 6	Rensselaer	Broadmoor Ice Palace	Recap
(Philpott) Bill MacFarland - 8:00		First period	03:39 - PP - Gordie Peterkin (Mosco); 04:00 - PP - Gordie Peterkin (unassisted); 07:?? - PP - Ambrose Mosco (Pope)
(MacFarland) Jim Haas - 02:07 (Philpott, Goold) Bill MacFarland - 08:36		Second period	15:40 - PP - Frank Chiarelli (Mosco, Peterkin)
(unassisted) Bill MacFarland - 17:57		Third period	03:14 - GW PP - Gordie Peterkin (Mosco); 19:31 - EN - Jim Pope (Mosco)
Willard Ikola		Goalie stats	Bob Fox

=== Consolation Game ===
==== Michigan vs. Boston College ====
March 13	Michigan	7 – 2	Boston College	Broadmoor Ice Palace	Recap
(Goold) Doug Philpott - 6:10 (Philpott, MacFarland) Jim Haas - 13:13		First period	12:32 - Dick Dempsey (Gagliard)
(MacFarland) Doug Philpott - GW - 15:58		Second period	No scoring
(MacFarland) Doug Philpott - 01:25 (Mullen) George Chin - 01:41 (Chin) Bill MacFarland - SH - 11:32 (MacFarland) Doug Mullen - 14:31		Third period	03:14 - James Cisternelli (Quinn, Siblo)
Bill Lucier		Goalie stats

=== National Championship ===
==== (W2) Minnesota vs. (E2) Rensselaer ====
March 13	Minnesota	4 – 5	OT	Rensselaer	Broadmoor Ice Palace	Recap

Scoring summary
Period	Team	Goal	Assist(s)	Time	Score
1st	RPI	Abbie Moore	Mosco	17:07	1–0 RPI
1st	RPI	Frank Chiarelli – PP	Paradise	19:42	2–0 RPI
2nd	RPI	Ambrose Mosco	Moore	22:45	3–0 RPI
2nd	MIN	Ken Yackel	unassisted	23:09	3–1 RPI
2nd	MIN	Dick Dougherty	Campbell	25:32	3–2 RPI
3rd	MIN	John Mayasich	Dougherty	44:29	3–3
3rd	MIN	Dick Dougherty	Mayasich	48:30	4–3 Minn
3rd	RPI	Abbie Moore	Chiarelli	56:10	4–4
1st Overtime	RPI	Gordie Peterkin – GW	Magadini	61:54	5–4 RPI
Penalty summary
Period	Team	Player	Penalty	Time	PIM
1st	MIN	Dick Meredith		14:21	2:00
1st	MIN	John Monahan		18:21	2:00
2nd	RPI	Lloyd Bauer		27:39	2:00
2nd	MIN	George Jetty		31:28	2:00
2nd	MIN	Dick Meredith	Charging	34:17	2:00
3rd	RPI	Jim Pope		41:54	2:00
3rd	RPI	Frank Paradise		42:25	2:00
1st Overtime	none				

Shots by period
Team	1	2	3	OT	T
Minnesota	8	14	22	0	44
Rensselaer	11	8	4	2	25

Goaltenders
Team	Name	Saves	Goals against	Time on ice
MIN	Jim Mattson	20	5	
RPI	Bob Fox	40	4	

== All-Tournament team ==
=== First team ===
- G: Bob Fox (Rensselaer)
- D: Jim Pope (Rensselaer)
- D: Ken Yackel (Minnesota)
- F: Frank Chiarelli (Rensselaer)
- F: John Mayasich (Minnesota)
- F: Gordie Peterkin (Rensselaer)

* Most Outstanding Player(s)

=== Second team ===
- G: Jim Mattson (Minnesota)
- D: Jim Haas (Michigan)
- D: Bob Siblo (Boston College)
- F: Abbie Moore* (Rensselaer)
- F: Bill MacFarland (Michigan)
- F: Dick Dougherty (Minnesota)
