= John Mayasich =

American ice hockey player

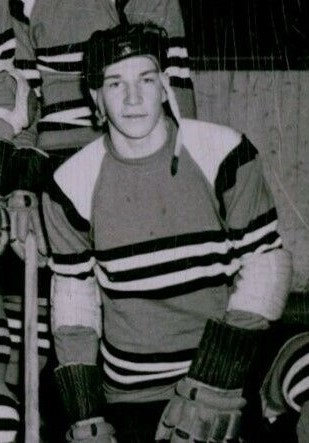
- Born: May 22, 1933 (age 93) Eveleth, Minnesota, U.S.
- Height: 6 ft 1 in (185 cm)
- Weight: 216 lb (98 kg; 15 st 6 lb)
- Position: Center
- Shot: Left
- National team: United States
- Playing career: 1951–1971
Medal record
Men's Ice hockey
Representing United States
| Silver medal – second place | 1956 Cortina d'Ampezzo | Ice hockey |
| Gold medal – first place | 1960 Squaw Valley | Ice hockey |

John Edward Mayasich (Croatian: Meašić; born May 22, 1933) is an American former ice hockey player of Croatian descent. He was a member of the U.S. ice hockey team that won a silver medal at the 1956 Winter Olympics and a gold medal at the 1960 Winter Olympics. He also played for Team USA at the IIHF World Championships in 1958, 1961, 1962 (when he was voted best defenseman), 1966 and 1969. He was inducted into the IIHF Hall of Fame in 1997.

While attending the University of Minnesota, Mayasich set the NCAA tournament record for most points scored in a game with eight against Michigan in 1954. Mayasich won the Western Collegiate Hockey Association scoring title in 1954 and 1955 and was an All-American three years in a row at his university.

Mayasich was inducted into the United States Hockey Hall of Fame in 1976 and the Wisconsin Hockey Hall of Fame in 1989. Number 8 has been retired in his honor by the Minnesota Golden Gophers men's ice hockey program, the only former Golden Gopher to be so honored. In 2011, Mayasich was ranked No 1 on the Minneapolis Star Tribune's list of "Minnesota's 100 Greatest Players in High School Hockey History".

== Career ==
Mayasich was born in Minnesota, to Croatian parents who had immigrated from the former Yugoslavia.

He attended Eveleth High School in Eveleth, Minnesota, and participated in a number of sports. During his high school hockey career, he set many individual records and helped his team achieve additional team records that stand even today. Among those records are the 46 total points he recorded at numerous state tournament games and helping his team win four consecutive state championships from 1948 to 1951.

Mayasich played on both the 1956 Olympic silver medal team in Cortina d'Ampezzo, Italy, and the 1960 Olympic Gold Medal team in Squaw Valley, California.

He is the Minnesota Gophers' all-time leading scorer with 144 goals and 154 assists in 111 games played, an average of about 1.3 goals per game. Mayasich also held scoring records in the high school ranks. While he still holds most state tournament records, a pair of Gophers, Dave Spehar and John Pohl, have since broken his all-time career scoring mark. Coach Doug Woog pointed out, "We drew the parallel with Dave Spehar," Woog said. "He (Spehar) was the most contemporary state tournament phenom; he had three hat tricks. John had seven. His numbers are phenomenal."

Despite his stellar accomplishments in college and international hockey, Mayasich never got any offers to pursue an NHL career. "It wasn't a source of bitterness, since no college players were being given a chance," he later told Sports Illustrated in 1999,"but there's still regret, even to this day, not knowing if I could have done it." Mayasich did briefly play some minor league hockey for the St. Paul Saints and Minneapolis Millers as well as permanently for the amateur Green Bay Bobcats, earning extra money, but his professional career was in the broadcasting industry. After earlier positions, John joined Hubbard Broadcasting, Inc. (St. Paul) as General Manager of KS95 FM, guiding its growth to become one of the highest-rated major market FMs in the country. In 1983, Mayasich was promoted to President of Hubbard's radio division and served in that position until his retirement in 1997. He has remained active as a consultant to Hubbard.

== Awards and honors ==
| Award | Year |
|---|---|
| All-MCHL Second Team | 1951–52 |
| AHCA Second Team All-American | 1951–52 |
| All-MCHL First Team | 1952–53 |
| AHCA First Team All-American | 1952–53 |
| NCAA All-Tournament Second Team | 1953 |
| All-WIHL First Team | 1953–54 |
| AHCA First Team All-American | 1953–54 |
| NCAA All-Tournament First Team | 1954 |
| All-WIHL First Team | 1954–55 |
| AHCA Second Team All-American | 1954–55 |
| IIHF 1962 Ice Hockey World Championships best defenseman | 1962 |
| IIHF Hall of Fame | 1997 |
| Croatian American Sports Hall of Fame. | 2024 |

== See also ==
- List of members of the United States Hockey Hall of Fame
- List of Croatian Americans

Awards and achievements
| Preceded by Frank Chiarelli | NCAA Ice Hockey Scoring Champion; 1952–53, 1953–54 | Succeeded by Bill Cleary |
| Preceded by Jack Kelley | Hobey Baker Legends of College Hockey Award; 1995 | Succeeded by Len Ceglarski |
