= Bill Begg =

Hospital administrator in Connecticut, United States

Dr. Bill Begg
- Born: Newtown, Connecticut, U.S.
- Education: New York Medical College (MD)
- Alma mater: Johns Hopkins Hospital (Residency)
- Occupations: Emergency medicine physician, medical executive
- Employer(s): Vassar Brothers Medical Center; Danbury Hospital
- Known for: Gun violence prevention advocacy; CPR heroism; testimony before U.S. Senate; featured in Newtown (2016)

Dr. Bill Begg is the vice president of medical affairs at Vassar Brothers Medical Center in Poughkeepsie, New York, and an emergency medicine physician at Danbury Hospital in Connecticut. Previously, he was vice chairman of emergency medicine at Danbury Hospital. Dr. Begg is best known for his activism in the wake of the Sandy Hook school shooting on December 14, 2012.

Dr. Begg focuses on addressing gun control as a public health issue, and has testified before the Senate Judiciary Committee on such issues. He was profiled in the feature film Newtown (2016), as well as PBS short film We Are All Newtown (2017).

Dr. Begg is also known for saving lives while running. In 2007, near a race course in his hometown of Newtown, Connecticut, Begg performed CPR on a runner who had fallen during the race. A few months later a man collapsed 100 yards in front of him at the Ridgefield Half Marathon. Dr. Begg performed CPR, which was credited for saving the man's life. Dr. Begg has also finished several Ironman triathlons with his family.

Dr. Begg was instrumental in informing "Impossible Operation"—an initiative by gun-safety organization Change the Ref designed to call attention to the medical side of gun violence.

== Education ==
Begg graduated from New York Medical College in 1989 and did his internship and residency at Johns Hopkins Hospital.
