= Rensselaer Holiday Tournament =

The Rensselaer Holiday Tournament was a college ice hockey tournament hosted by the Rensselaer Polytechnic Institute in Troy, New York. The tournament was held annually for a duration of sixty years, from 1951 to 2010 at the Houston Field House. It was, at various times, known as the Rensselaer Invitational, RPI Invitational, RPI Invitational Christmas Tournament, RPI Christmas Tournament, Rensselaer/Midland Bank Holiday Tournament, Rensselaer/HSBC Holiday Tournament and Rensselaer/Bank of America Holiday Tournament. It was the oldest college hockey tournament in the United States, older than the Beanpot by a year. Since the tournament has not been renewed since the 2010-2011 season, The Beanpot is now the oldest.

In the first edition, eight teams played in a knockout bracket. From 1952 until 1980, four teams played a round-robin. Beginning in 1981, four teams were seeded and played a bracket format with a consolation game. Rensselaer won the championship for the first time in nearly a decade in what turned out to be the tournament's final year.

== Results ==
Year	Champion	Runner-up	Third place	Fourth place	Fifth place	Sixth place	Seventh place	Eighth place
1951	Brown	St. Patrick's	RPI	Loyola	Harvard	Dartmouth	Williams	MIT

Year	Champion	Runner-up	Third place	Fourth place
1952	Princeton	RPI	St. Patrick's	Yale
1953	St. Francis Xavier	RPI	Brown	Princeton
1954	Toronto	RPI	St. Francis Xavier	Yale
1955	Minnesota	RPI	Princeton	Loyola
1956	Michigan Tech	McGill	RPI	Laval
1957	RPI	Brown	Yale	New Brunswick
1958	Michigan State	RPI	Brown	Princeton
1959	North Dakota	Montreal	RPI	Yale
1960	RPI	Harvard	New Brunswick	Princeton
1961	Michigan	RPI	McGill	Yale
1962	Minnesota	McMaster	RPI	Providence
1963	RPI	Cornell	Loyola	Yale
1964	Minnesota–Duluth	McGill	RPI	Colgate
1965	Western Ontario	Bowdoin	RPI	Middlebury
1966	Michigan	RPI	Colgate	New Brunswick
1967	McMaster	Michigan Tech	RPI	Yale
1968	Waterloo	RPI	Army	Ohio
1969	Providence	RPI	Montreal	Bowling Green
1970	Wisconsin	RPI	Western Ontario	Northeastern
1971	Clarkson	RPI	Ohio	New Brunswick
1972	Minnesota–Duluth	RPI	Providence	Carleton
1973	Boston University	RPI	Dartmouth	Ohio State
1974	Northeastern	Bowling Green	RPI	Sir George Williams
1975	Providence	RPI	Princeton	Northeastern
1976	RPI	Clarkson	Yale	Penn
1977	RPI	Ohio State	St. Mary's	McGill
1978	St. Lawrence	RPI	Princeton	Air Force
1979	Western Michigan	Northeastern	Western Ontario	RPI
1980	Maine	RPI	Vasby	Holy Cross
1981	St. Lawrence	Brown	North Dakota	RPI
1982	RPI	UMass Lowell	Bowling Green	Brown
1983	RPI	UMass Lowell	Northern Arizona	Yale
1984	RPI	Toronto	Miami (OH)	Ferris State
1985	RPI	Lake Superior State	RIT	Alaska–Anchorage
1986	Ferris State	Alaska–Fairbanks	Merrimack	RPI
1987	RPI	McGill	Holy Cross	U.S. International
1988	Providence	RPI	Air Force	Notre Dame
1989	RPI	Merrimack	Union	Brown
1990	RPI	Western Ontario	Union	Alaska–Fairbanks
1991	St. Lawrence	RPI	Northeastern	Union
1992	Providence	RPI	Clarkson	UMass Lowell
1993	RPI	UMass Lowell	Army	Mount Allison
1994	Maine	RPI	Merrimack	Miami (OH)
1995	Clarkson	Illinois–Chicago	Providence	RPI
1996	RPI	Brown	UMass	Bowling Green
1997	Lake Superior	RPI	Yale	Army
1998	RPI	Minnesota–Duluth	Merrimack	Union
1999	Providence	RPI	Bowling Green	Union
2000	St. Lawrence	Providence	RPI	Notre Dame
2001	RPI	UMass	Niagara	Quinnipiac
2002	Merrimack	Wayne State	Princeton	RPI
2003	Northeastern	Mercyhurst	Colgate	RPI
2004	Air Force	RPI	Robert Morris	Sacred Heart
2005	Nebraska–Omaha	Holy Cross	RPI	Providence
2006	Niagara	Colgate	RPI	Ohio State
2007	Notre Dame	RPI	Alabama–Huntsville	American International
2008	Northeastern	RPI	Mercyhurst	Princeton
2009	Union	RPI	Bentley	Lake Superior
2010	RPI	Bowling Green	Alabama-Huntsville	Connecticut
