= Richard Dougherty =

American ice hockey player

Personal information
- Full name: Richard Leo Dougherty
- Born: August 5, 1932 Fort Frances, Ontario, Canada
- Died: November 23, 2016 (aged 84) International Falls, Minnesota, U.S.
Medal record
Men's ice hockey
Representing United States
Olympic Games
Silver medal – second place	1956 Cortina d'Ampezzo	Ice hockey

Richard Leo Dougherty (August 5, 1932 – November 23, 2016) was an American ice hockey player. He led the United States to a silver medal at the 1956 Winter Olympics. He was inducted into the United States Hockey Hall of Fame in 2003. Dougherty was born in Fort Frances, Ontario, Canada but moved to International Falls when he was 5 years old. He attended the University of Minnesota, where he was a brother of Phi Gamma Delta. Dougherty died November 23, 2016, at the age of 84.

== Awards and honors ==
Award	Year	Notes
All-MCHL First Team	1952–53	
All-WIHL First Team	1953–54	
AHCA First Team All-American	1953–54	
NCAA All-Tournament Second Team	1954	
