= Gene Campbell =

American ice hockey player

Olympic medal record

Men's Ice hockey

Representing United States
Silver medal – second place	1956 Cortina d'Ampezzo	Ice hockey

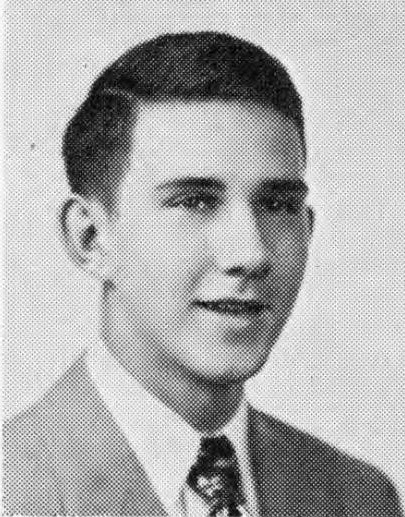
Campbell as a senior at South High School in 1950

Eugene Edward Campbell (August 17, 1932 – April 8, 2013) was an American ice hockey player. He played for the Minnesota Golden Gophers. He won a silver medal with the United States national team at the 1956 Winter Olympics. He was born in Minneapolis, Minnesota and died at Lake Minnetonka Shores in Spring Park, Minnesota.

Campbell and Ken Johannson were the inaugural coaches for the Rochester Lourdes High School boys' hockey program.

== Awards and honors ==
Award	Year
All-MCHL Second Team	1952–53
