= RPI Engineers men's ice hockey =

College ice hockey program

- Current season
- University: Rensselaer Polytechnic Institute
- Conference: ECAC
- First season: 1901–02
- Head coach: Eric Lang; 1st season
- Assistant coaches: Mathias Lange; Cory Schneider
- Arena: Houston Field House; Troy, New York
- Colors: Cherry and white

NCAA tournament champions
- 1954, 1985

NCAA tournament Frozen Four
- 1953, 1954, 1961, 1964, 1985

NCAA tournament appearances
- 1953, 1954, 1961, 1964, 1984, 1985, 1994, 1995, 2011

Conference tournament champions
- ECAC: 1984, 1985, 1995

Conference regular season champions
- TSL: 1952, 1953, 1954, 1957, 1969, 1972; ECAC: 1984, 1985

Current uniform

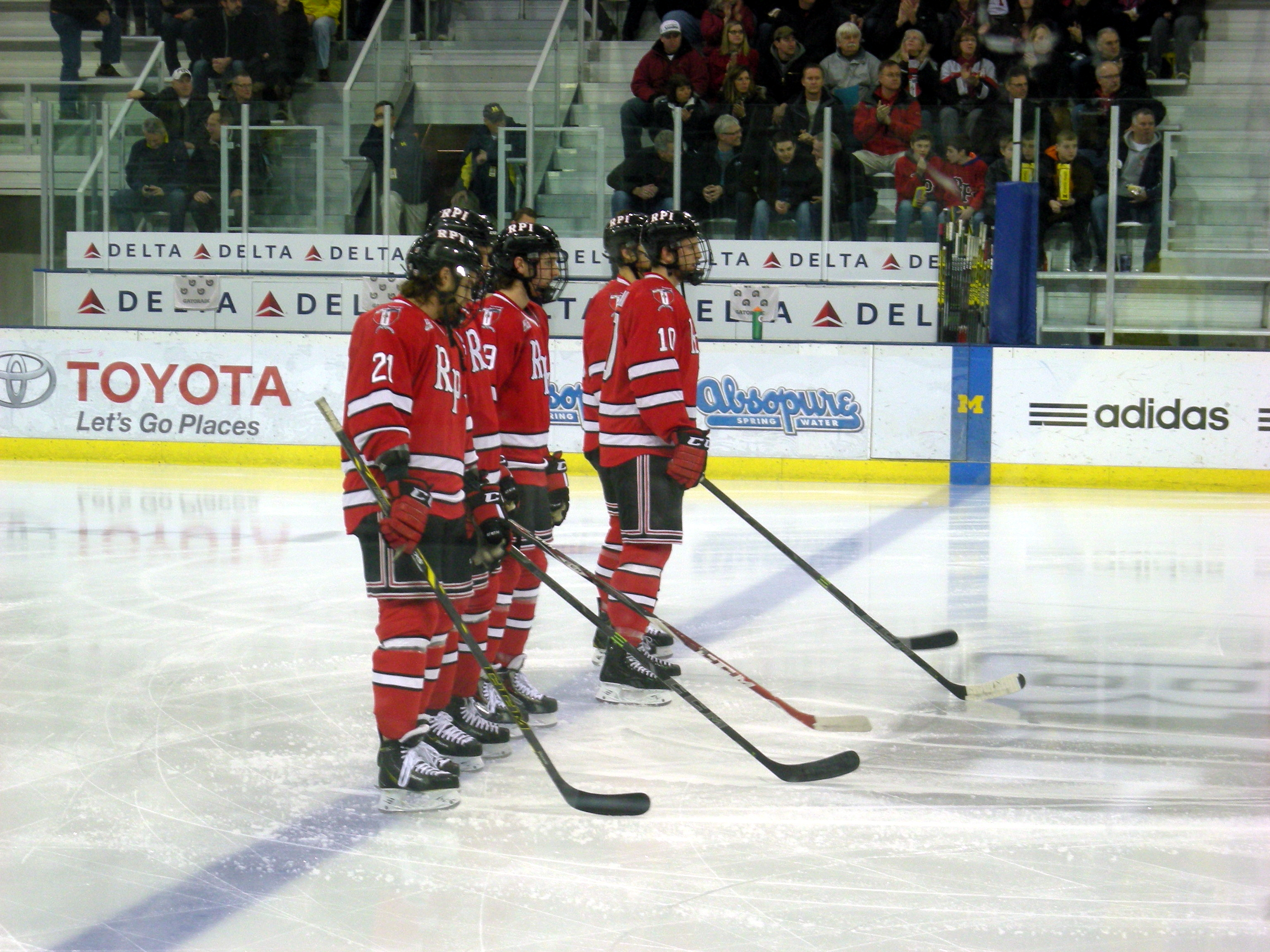
November 2014 game against Michigan

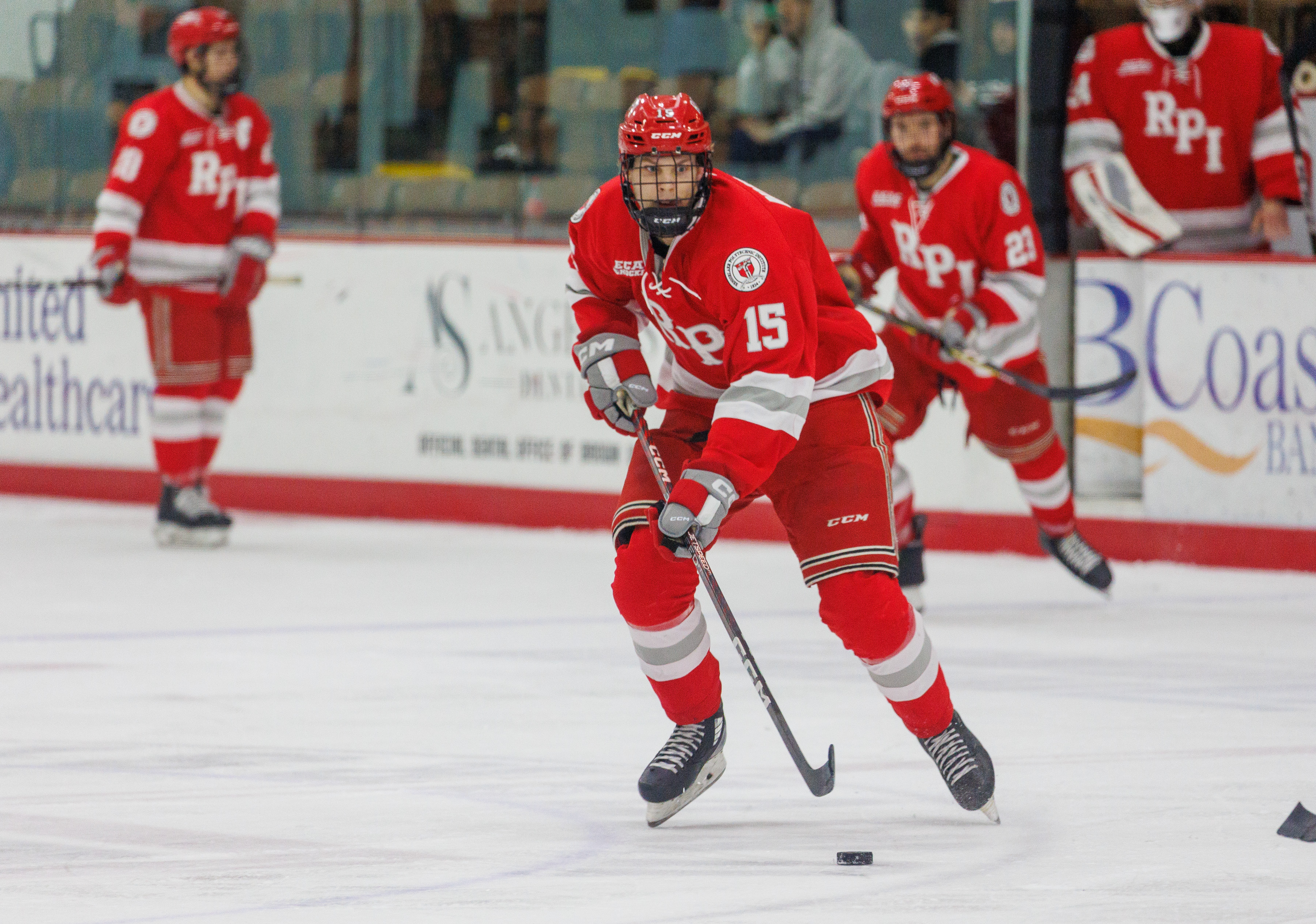
Altti Nykänen in 2023

The RPI Engineers men's ice hockey team is a National Collegiate Athletic Association (NCAA) Division I college ice hockey program that represents Rensselaer Polytechnic Institute (RPI). The Engineers are a member of ECAC Hockey conference and play their home games at Houston Field House in Troy, New York.

== History ==
Men's ice hockey at RPI dates back to 1901 and is one of the oldest programs in the United States. The team played as an independent NCAA Division I team from its inception in 1901 through 1938. The team resumed after World War II for the 1949–50 season, and in the following season Rensselaer joined Clarkson, Colgate, Middlebury, St. Lawrence, and Williams to form the Tri-State League for the 1950–51 season. The next three seasons, the 1952–1954 team won the Tri-State League season championships. RPI's first NCAA tournament berth in 1953, coming in third, and the following season in 1954 the team won its first NCAA Men's Division I Ice Hockey Championship. After a six-year drought the program again made the NCAA tournament in 1961, finishing fourth. The 1960–61 season would be the last season RPI competed in the Tri-State League, as RPI and fellow Tri-State League members Clarkson and St. Lawrence joined the new ECAC Hockey League.

Depending on how the rules are interpreted, the RPI men's ice hockey team may have the longest winning streak on record for a Division I team; in the 1984–85 season it went undefeated for 30 games, but one game was against the University of Toronto, a non-NCAA team. Continuing into the 1985–86 season, RPI continued undefeated over 38 games, including two wins over Toronto. Adam Oates and Daren Puppa, two players during that time, both went on to become stars in the NHL. Joe Juneau, who played from 1987 to 1991, also spent many years in the NHL. Graeme Townshend, who also played in the late 1980s, had a brief NHL career. He is the first person of Jamaican ancestry to play in the National Hockey League.

== Traditions ==
The hockey team plays a significant role in the campus's culture, drawing thousands of fans each week to the Houston Field House during the season. The team's popularity even sparked the tradition of the hockey line, where students lined up for season tickets months in advance of the on-sale date. Today, the line generally begins a week or more before ticket sales. Another tradition since 1978 has been the "Big Red Freakout!" game held close to the first weekend of February. Fans usually dress in the schools colors Red and White, and gifts such as tee-shirts are distributed en masse.

From 1995 to 2009, RPI's Division III teams were known as the Red Hawks. However the hockey, football, cross-country, tennis, and track and field teams all chose to retain the longstanding Engineers name. The Red Hawks name was, at the time, very unpopular among the student body; a Red Hawk mascot was frequently taunted with thrown concessions and chants of "kill the chicken!" This was a major factor behind "Engineers" being restored for all teams in 2009.

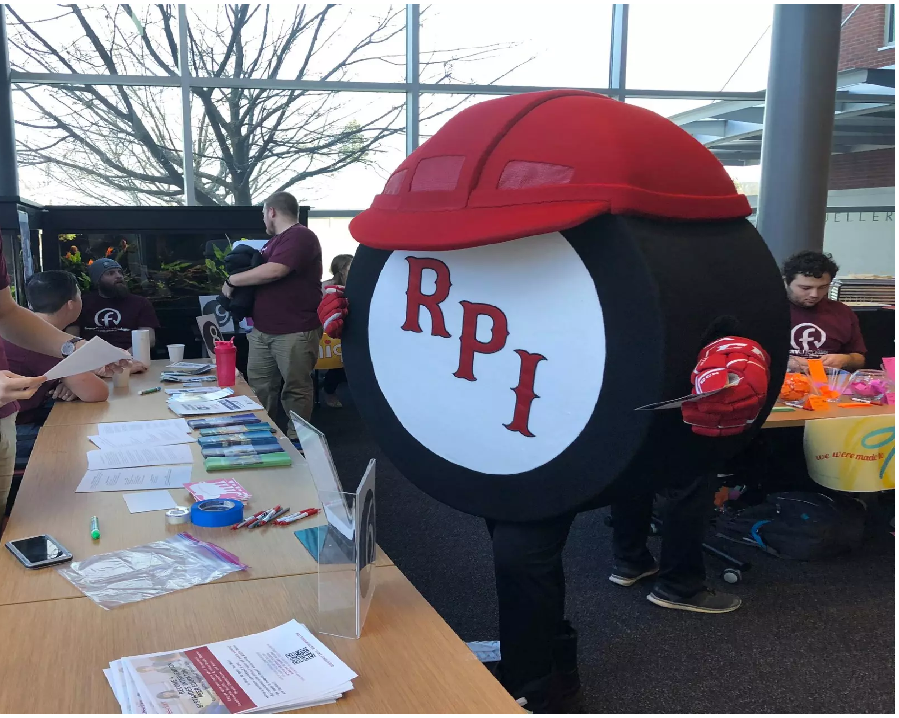
RPI Hockey Mascot "Puckman"

The official hockey mascot, The Puckman–an anthropomorphic hockey puck with an engineer's helmet–has always been popular.

== Season ==
The RPI Engineers men's ice hockey typically plays between 35 and 42 regular season games per season in the ECAC Hockey Conference. They also usually play one exhibition game against a Canadian college hockey team from Ontario, Nova Scotia, or Quebec. During the season, RPI will play 22 conference games against the other 11 teams in the ECAC. RPI will play each team home game at the Houston Field House and each away game at the respective university's campus. The conference games are typically played on Friday and Saturday nights, with the ECAC scheduling reflecting the Ivy League scheduling of having traveling partners. RPI's travel partner has been Union College since they joined the league in the 1991-92 season. They also play 10-12 non-conference games against teams not in the ECAC. These games typically take place at the beginning of the season in October and around the Thanksgiving and New Year holidays. RPI also plays one non-conference game against their Capital District geographic rival, Union, at the Times Union Center, typically on the last Saturday of January in what has become known as the Mayor's Cup. RPI has opened ECAC Hockey conference play on the last weekend of October against Union since the 2012–13 season. The first conference home game is known as Black Friday or Black Saturday which alternates each year. Other highlights of the season include the Big Red Freakout, which is played on the last or second to last Saturday home game in February.

At the conclusion of the regular season the team will play a minimum of two postseason games in the ECAC Hockey men's ice hockey tournament in the beginning of March. If RPI wins the ECAC Tournament or is invited to the NCAA tournament as an at-large team, they would then play at least one postseason game in late March in the single elimination tournament. RPI last played in the NCAA tournament in 2011.

== Season-by-season results ==
Source:

== Records vs. current ECAC Hockey teams ==
As of the completion of 2018–19 season

School	Team	Away Arena	Overall record	Win %	Last Result
Brown University	Bears	Meehan Auditorium	63–30–9	.662	0-3 L
Clarkson University	Golden Knights	Cheel Arena	51–97–11	.355	2-5 L
Colgate University	Raiders	Class of 1965 Arena	65–63–5	.508	1-2 L (OT)
Cornell University	Big Red	Lynah Rink	38–63–11	.388	3-2 W
Dartmouth College	Big Green	Thompson Arena	46–42–11	.520	2-5 L
Harvard University	Crimson	Bright-Landry Hockey Center	37–58–8	.398	1-3 L
Princeton University	Tigers	Hobey Baker Memorial Rink	69–37–11	.637	6-2 W
Quinnipiac University	Bobcats	People's United Center	7–17–9	.348	1-2
St. Lawrence University	Saints	Appleton Arena	60–83–7	.423	6-5 W
Union College	Dutchmen	Achilles Rink	53–40–11	.563	0-0 T
Yale University	Bulldogs	Ingalls Rink	57–52–6	.522	0-4 L

== Head coaches ==
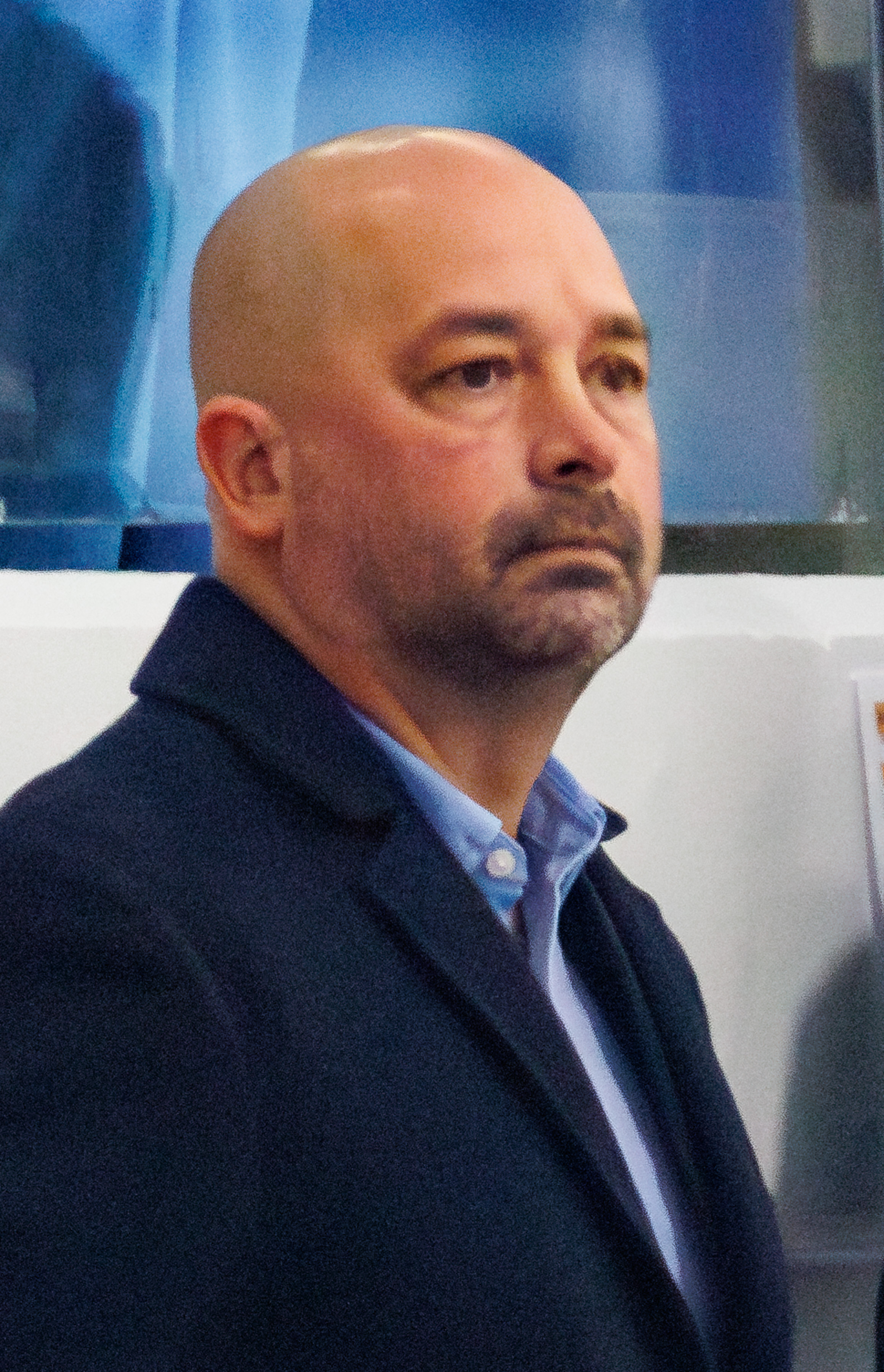
Eric Lang

As of the completion of 2025–26 season

Tenure	Coach	Years	Record	Pct.
1901–1904, 1906–1917, 1923–1924	No Coach	15	14–34–3	.304
1917–1923	Leroy Clark	6	3–17–1	.167
1924–1925	W. J. Cook	1	2–2–0	.500
1925–1931, 1936–1937	Marvin Callan	8	6–20–2	.250
1949–1963	Ned Harkness	14	176–96–7	.643
1963–1964	Rube Bjorkman	1	18–8–0	.692
1964–1969	Garry Kearns	5	44–63–4	.414
1969–1972	Leon Abbott	3	41–31–4	.566
1972–1979	Jim Salfi	7	103–94–7	.522
1979–1989	Mike Addesa	10	186–124–9	.597
1989–1994	Buddy Powers	5	94–63–13	.591
1994–2006	Dan Fridgen	12	211–193–38	.520
2006–2017	Seth Appert	11	152–221–48	.418
2017–2025	Dave Smith	7	87–152–19	.374
2025–present	Eric Lang	1	11–23–1	.329
Totals	14 coaches	106 seasons	1,148–1,141–157	.501

== Current roster ==
As of August 19, 2025.

No.	Nat.	Player	Class	Pos	Height	Weight	DoB	Hometown	Previous team	NHL rights
2	(United States)	Jimmy Goffredo	Sophomore	D	5' 11" (1.8 m)	185 lb (84 kg)	2003-04-24	Mount Laurel, New Jersey	Des Moines Buccaneers (USHL)	—
4	(Canada)	Matthew Jovanovic	Freshman	D	6' 2" (1.88 m)	201 lb (91 kg)	2004-09-22	Toronto, Ontario	Saginaw Spirit (OHL)	—
5	(United States)	Kazimier Sobieski	Sophomore	D	6' 1" (1.85 m)	181 lb (82 kg)	2004-04-12	Deerfield, Massachusetts	Sioux Falls Stampede (USHL)	—
6	(Austria)	Thomas Klassek	Freshman	D	6' 0" (1.83 m)	183 lb (83 kg)	2005-02-18	Klagenfurt, Austria	EC KAC (ICEHL)	—
8	(United States)	Gunnar VanDamme	Junior	F	6' 0" (1.83 m)	182 lb (83 kg)	2002-12-08	Pittsford, New York	Alaska Anchorage (NCAA)	—
9	(Canada)	Ethan Bono	Sophomore	F	6' 3" (1.91 m)	201 lb (91 kg)	2004-01-15	Port McNeill, British Columbia	Merrimack (HEA)	—
10	(Latvia)	Gustavs Ozoliņš	Sophomore	D	5' 10" (1.78 m)	181 lb (82 kg)	2003-06-19	Riga, Latvia	Minnesota Wilderness (NAHL)	—
11	(Latvia)	Rainers Rullers	Sophomore	F	6' 4" (1.93 m)	194 lb (88 kg)	2004-12-11	Riga, Latvia	Madison Capitols (USHL)	—
14	(United States)	Trevor Russell	Graduate	D	6' 2" (1.88 m)	197 lb (89 kg)	2000-02-02	Old Hickory, Tennessee	Michigan Tech (CCHA)	—
16	(Canada)	Lucas Lemieux	Freshman	D	6' 4" (1.93 m)	201 lb (91 kg)	2005-09-29	Edmonton, Alberta	Trail Smoke Eaters (BCHL)	—
18	(Canada)	Tyler Wallace	Junior	F	6' 2" (1.88 m)	188 lb (85 kg)	2002-05-19	Calgary, Alberta	Niagara (AHA)	—
19	(United States)	Jackson Kyrkostas	Freshman	F	6' 0" (1.83 m)	170 lb (77 kg)	2004-08-19	Windham, New Hampshire	West Kelowna Warriors (BCHL)	—
21	(Canada)	Matthew Buckley	Freshman	F	5' 11" (1.8 m)	183 lb (83 kg)	2005-05-21	Oakville, Ontario	Oshawa Generals (OHL)	—
22	(Canada)	Landen Hilditch	Freshman	D	6' 4" (1.93 m)	201 lb (91 kg)	2005-08-17	Surrey, British Columbia	Penticton Vees (BCHL)	—
24	(United States)	Jack Gorton	Junior	F	6' 3" (1.91 m)	200 lb (91 kg)	2002-02-13	Granite Springs, New York	Boston University (HEA)	—
25	(Canada)	Dovar Tinling	Senior (RS)	F	5' 11" (1.8 m)	185 lb (84 kg)	2003-03-03	Pointe-Claire, Quebec	Penticton Vees (BCHL)	—
27	(United States)	Cole Gordon	Sophomore	F	6' 2" (1.88 m)	205 lb (93 kg)	2002-12-09	Windsor, Colorado	Arizona State (NCHC)	—
30	(Canada)	Nate Krawchuk	Freshman	G	6' 3" (1.91 m)	190 lb (86 kg)	2005-07-04	Thunder Bay, Ontario	Sudbury Wolves (OHL)	—
32	(United States)	Carson Dorfman	Sophomore	G	6' 0" (1.83 m)	179 lb (81 kg)	2003-10-06	Hermitage, Tennessee	Sioux City Musketeers (USHL)	—
33	(Latvia)	Bruno Brūveris	Junior	G	6' 0" (1.83 m)	170 lb (77 kg)	2002-03-09	Riga, Latvia	Cedar Rapids RoughRiders (USHL)	—
43	(United States)	Brad McNeil	Junior	F	6' 0" (1.83 m)	181 lb (82 kg)	2002-03-15	Royal Oak, Michigan	Maryland Black Bears (NAHL)	—
49	(Slovenia)	Filip Sitar	Sophomore	F	5' 11" (1.8 m)	183 lb (83 kg)	2005-06-29	Ljubljana, Slovenia	Malmö Redhawks J20 (J20 Nationell)	—
61	(Canada)	Lucas Matta	Senior	D	6' 2" (1.88 m)	185 lb (84 kg)	2002-10-04	Kleinburg, Ontario	Western Michigan (BCHL)	—
72	(Canada)	Jagger Tapper	Sophomore	F	6' 0" (1.83 m)	185 lb (84 kg)	2004-10-01	Calgary, Alberta	Okotoks Oilers (BCHL)	—
82	(Canada)	Mathieu Bourgault	Freshman (RS)	F	6' 2" (1.88 m)	176 lb (80 kg)	2003-03-31	Saint-Bruno-de-Montarville, Quebec	Bismarck Bobcats (NAHL)	—
86	(Sweden)	Alfred Lindberg	Junior	F	5' 11" (1.8 m)	185 lb (84 kg)	2002-01-28	Hallsberg, Sweden	American International (AHA)	—
91	(Austria)	Ian Scherzer	Freshman	F	6' 0" (1.83 m)	192 lb (87 kg)	2005-07-03	Villach, Austria	Madison Capitols (USHL)	—
93	(Canada)	Luc Wilson	Graduate	F	5' 8" (1.73 m)	170 lb (77 kg)	2001-11-22	Duncan, British Columbia	Minnesota State (CCHA)	—

== Statistical leaders ==
=== Career points leaders ===
Player	Years	GP	G	A	Pts	PIM
Frank Chiarelli	1951–1955	80	155	110	265	43
John Carter	1982–1986	131	117	108	225	207
Adam Oates	1982–1985	98	66	150	216	52
Bob Brinkworth	1961–1964	71	110	106	216	20
Joé Juneau	1987–1991	124	69	144	213	157
Paul Midghall	1956–1959	63	93	118	211	118
Abbie Moore	1951–1954	61	102	104	206	22
Bryan Richardson	1992–1996	141	80	113	193	146
Jerry Knightley	1962–1965	71	90	97	187	99
Mark Jooris	1982–1986	117	84	99	183	70

=== Career goaltending leaders ===
GP = Games played; Min = Minutes played; W = Wins; L = Losses; T = Ties; GA = Goals against; SO = Shutouts; SV% = Save percentage; GAA = Goals against average

Minimum 30 games

Player	Years	GP	Min	W	L	T	GA	SO	SV%	GAA
Owen Savory	2018–2021	49	2839	18	24	5	107	6	.929	2.26
Jason Kasdorf	2012–2016	88	5025	38	37	9	200	7	.920	2.39
Allen York	2008–2011	83	4898	37	34	8	202	4	.914	2.47
Nathan Marsters	2000–2004	115	6638	57	50	6	282	10	.917	2.55
Bryce Merriam	2009–2013	56	3102	18	30	5	134	3	.903	2.59
Joel Laing	1996–2000	90	5345	52	31	6	231	13	.926	2.59

Statistics current through the end of the 2022–23 season.

== Awards and honors ==
=== Hockey Hall of Fame ===
- Adam Oates (2012)

=== United States Hockey Hall of Fame ===
- Ned Harkness (1994)

=== NCAA ===
==== Individual awards ====
NCAA Scoring Champion

- Frank Chiarelli: 1952
- Jerry Knightley: 1964

NCAA tournament Most Outstanding Player

- Abbie Moore: 1954

==== All-Americans ====
AHCA First Team All-Americans

- 1952-53: Herb LaFontaine, D; Frank Chiarelli, F
- 1955-56: Garry Kearns, F
- 1957-58: Paul Midghall, F
- 1958-59: Paul Midghall, F
- 1962-63: Bob Brinkworth, F
- 1963-64: Bob Brinkworth, F; Jerry Knightley, F
- 1964-65: Jerry Knightley, F
- 1983-84: John Carter, F; Adam Oates, F
- 1984-85: Ken Hammond, D; Adam Oates, F
- 1985-86: Mike Dark, D
- 1989-90: Joé Juneau, F
- 1999-00: Joel Laing, G
- 2001-02: Marc Cavosie, F
- 2009-10: Chase Polacek, F
- 2010-11: Chase Polacek, F
- 2012-13: Nick Bailen, D

AHCA Second Team All-Americans

- 1951-52: Frank Chiarelli, F
- 1953-54: Frank Chiarelli, F; Abbie Moore, F
- 1983-84: Daren Puppa, G
- 1984-85: John Carter, F
- 1990-91: Joé Juneau, F
- 1992-93: Neil Little, G
- 1996-97: Eric Healey, F
- 1997-98: Eric Healey, F
- 1999-00: Brian Pothier, D; Brad Tapper, F
- 2001-02: Matt Murley, F
- 2010-11: Nick Bailen, D
- 2013-14: Ryan Haggerty, F

=== ECAC Hockey ===
==== Individual awards ====
Player of the Year

- Bob Brinkworth: 1963, 1964
- Marc Cavosie: 2002
- Chase Polacek: 2010, 2011

Rookie of the Year

- Bob Brinkworth: 1962
- Don Cutts: 1972
- George Servinis: 1983
- Jerry D'Amigo: 2010
- Jason Kasdorf: 2013

Ken Dryden Award

- Joel Laing: 2000

Most Outstanding Player in tournament

- Adam Oates: 1984
- Daren Puppa: 1985
- Mike Tamburro: 1995

==== All-Conference ====
First Team All-ECAC Hockey

- 1961-62: Bob Brinkworth, F
- 1962-63: Bob Brinkworth, F
- 1963-64: Bill Sack, D; Fred Kitchen, F; Bob Brinkworth, F; Jerry Knightley, F
- 1964-65: Jerry Knightley, F
- 1984-85: Ken Hammond, D; John Carter, F; Adam Oates, F
- 1985–86: Mike Dark, D
- 1989–90: Joé Juneau, F
- 1992–93: Neil Little, G
- 1997–98: Eric Healey, F
- 1998–99: Dan Riva, F
- 1999–00: Joel Laing, G; Brad Tapper, F
- 2001–02: Marc Cavosie, F; Matt Murley, F
- 2009–10: Chase Polacek, F
- 2010–11: Nick Bailen, D; Chase Polacek, F
- 2012–13: Nick Bailen, D
- 2013–14: Ryan Haggerty, F

Second Team All-ECAC Hockey

- 1961-62: Brian Robins, D; Tom McMahon, D; Jim Josephson, F
- 1962-63: Brian Pryce, D; Jerry Knightley, F
- 1963-64: Bill Grisdale, D
- 1967-68: Dale Watson, F
- 1971-72: Don Cutts, G
- 1972-73: Don Cutts, G
- 1977-78: Ian Harrison, G
- 1983-84: John Carter, F; Adam Oates, F; Marty Dallman, F
- 1990–91: Joé Juneau, F
- 1991–92: Stephane Robitaille, D
- 1992–93: Brad Layzell, D
- 1993–94: Ron Pasco, F
- 1994–95: Adam Bartell, D
- 1995–96: Patrick Rochon, D
- 1996–97: Eric Healey, F
- 1999–00: Brian Pothier, D
- 2003–04: Nathan Marsters, G; Scott Basiuk, D; Kevin Croxton, F
- 2009–10: Allen York, G
- 2012–13: Jason Kasdorf, G
- 2015–16: Jason Kasdorf, G
- 2019-20: Will Reilly, D
- 2021–22: Ture Linden, F

Third Team All-ECAC Hockey

- 2005–06: Keith McWilliams, D; Kevin Croxton, F
- 2006–07: Jake Luthi, D
- 2010–11: Allen York, G

ECAC Hockey All-Rookie Team

- 1987–88: Bruce Coles, F; Joé Juneau, F
- 1989–90: Allen Kummu, D; Francois Cadoret, F
- 1990–91: Neil Little, G
- 1991–92: Wayne Clarke, F; Craig Hamelin, F
- 1992–93: Tim Regan, F; Bryan Richardson, F
- 1994–95: Eric Healey, F
- 1995–96: Matt Garver, F; Alain St. Hilaire, F
- 1996–97: Pete Gardiner, F
- 1998–99: Matt Murley, F
- 1999–00: Marc Cavosie, F
- 2000–01: Nathan Marsters, G
- 2002–03: Kevin Croxton, F
- 2003–04: Oren Eizenman, F
- 2005–06: Mathias Lange, G
- 2007–08: Chase Polacek, F
- 2008–09: Patrick Cullen, F
- 2009–10: Jerry D'Amigo, F; Brandon Pirri, F
- 2012–13: Jason Kasdorf, G
- 2014–15: Drew Melanson, F
- 2015–16: Cam Hackett, G
- 2022–23: Sutter Muzzatti, F

== Olympians ==
This is a list of Rensselaer alumni were a part of an Olympic team.

Name	Position	Rensselaer Tenure	Team	Year	Finish
Joé Juneau	Left Wing	1987–1991	(Canada) CAN	1992	Silver
Marty Dallman	Center	1980–1984	(Austria) AUT	1994	12th
Maurizio Mansi	Right Wing	1984–1988	(Italy) ITA	1994, 1998	9th, 12th
Mathias Lange	Goaltender	2005–2009	(Austria) AUT	2014	10th
Miloš Bubela	Forward	2012–2016	(Slovakia) SVK	2018	11th
Justin Addamo	Forward	2021–2022	(France) FRA	2026	11th

== Engineers in the NHL ==
As of July 1, 2025.

= NHL All-Star team	= NHL All-Star	= NHL All-Star and NHL All-Star team	= Hall of Famers

Player	Position	Team(s)	Years	Games	Stanley Cups
Erik Burgdoerfer	Defenseman	BUF, OTT	2016–2019	8	0
John Carter	Left Wing	BOS, SJS	1985–1993	244	0
Don Cutts	Goaltender	EDM	1979–1980	6	0
Jerry D'Amigo	Left Wing	TOR, BUF	2013–2015	31	0
Marty Dallman	Center	TOR	1987–1989	6	0
Mike Dark	Defenseman	STL	1986–1988	43	0
Tim Friday	Defenseman	DET	1985–1986	23	0
Ken Hammond	Defenseman	LAK, EDM, NYR, TOR, BOS, SJS, VAN, OTT	1984–1993	193	0
Eric Healey	Left Wing	BOS	2005–2006	2	0
Joé Juneau	Center	BOS, WSH, BUF, OTT, PHX, MTL	1991–2004	828	0
Jason Kasdorf	Goaltender	BUF	2015–2016	1	0
Larry Landon	Left Wing	MTL, TOR	1983–1985	9	0
Neil Little	Goaltender	PHI	2001–2004	2	0

Player	Position	Team(s)	Years	Games	Stanley Cups
Mike McPhee	Forward	MTL, MNS, DAL	1983–1994	744	1
Matt Murley	Left Wing	PIT, PHX	2003–2008	62	0
Kraig Nienhuis	Left Wing	BOS	1985–1988	87	0
Adam Oates	Center	DET, STL, BOS, WSH, PHI, ANA, EDM	1985–2004	1,337	0
Brandon Pirri	Center	CHI, FLA, ANA, NYR, VGK	2010–2021	276	0
Brian Pothier	Defenseman	ATL, OTT, WSH, CAR	2000–2010	362	0
Daren Puppa	Goaltender	BUF, TOR, TBL	1985–2000	429	0
George Servinis	Left Wing	MNS	1987–1988	5	0
Steve Stoyanovich	Center	HFD	1983–1984	23	0
Brad Tapper	Right Wing	ATL	2000–2003	71	0
Graeme Townshend	Right Wing	BOS, NYI, OTT	1989–1994	45	0
Allen York	Goaltender	CBJ	2011–2012	11	0
Mike Zalewski	Left Wing	VAN	2013–2017	6	0

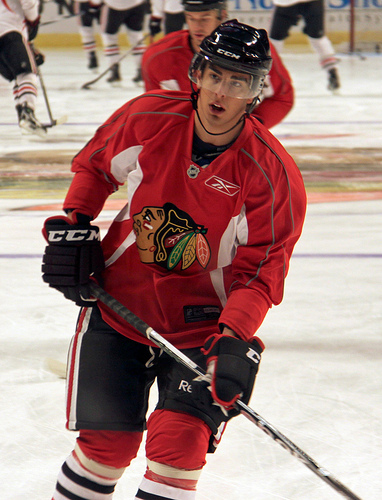
Brandon Pirri
