= Tri-State League (ice hockey) =

Ice hockey conference

- Association: NCAA
- Founded: 1950
- Folded: 1972
- Sports fielded: Ice hockey
- Division: Division I
- No. of teams: 6 (1950–51), 5 (1951–52), 4 (1952–53 through 1958–59), 3 (1959–60 through 1971–72)
- Region: Northeastern United States

The Tri-State League was an NCAA Division I ice hockey-only conference. The league was the first attempt at creating a conference for hockey programs and, while it did not succeed in its goals, succeeding conferences were able to learn from the mistakes made and flaws in its design to form effective and long-lasting divisions.

== History ==
Formed in 1950 by the six colleges, all located in the Northeast, the Tri-State League was named for the three states represented by the schools: Massachusetts with Williams, New York with Clarkson, Colgate, Rensselaer and St. Lawrence and Vermont with Middlebury. In the first season each school played one another once, resulting in five conference games for every team. After the 1950–51 season, however, Colgate left the conference, leaving the league with only five member teams. The following year seven western teams formed the MCHL and while it wasn't a direct rival to the Tri-State League it had several advantages over its eastern counterpart. For one the MCHL contained the majority of the regional schools playing D-I ice hockey so its league champion would almost assuredly be invited to the NCAA tournament whereas the Eastern region had more than 30 schools playing at the top level, giving the Tri-State League a much smaller footprint. Its influence grew even smaller after the second season when Williams left the conference, not only reducing its numbers to four, but no longer making the conference's title geographically correct.

It wasn't all bad news for the Tri-State League, however, as St. Lawrence was invited to play in the 1952 tournament. In fact, the Tri-State League would send a representative to the tournament each year from 1952 through 1964. With the success of the three remaining New York schools, Middlebury was left far behind in the standings, winning only two games over a seven-year stretch before leaving the conference after 1958–59. With only three teams as members the Tri-State League was a conference in name only and became completely superfluous in 1961 when the 28-team mega conference, ECAC Hockey, was formed including all three teams still in the Tri-State League.

The Tri-State League continued to award a trophy at the conclusion of the regular season for several years, even after changing its name to the ICAC (Independent College Athletic Conference), but even that was abandoned after 1971–72. Since joining ECAC Hockey in 1961, Clarkson, Rensselaer and St. Lawrence have remained in the conference and were reunited with Colgate the same year. While both Middlebury and Williams were inaugural members of the ECAC, both were dropped down to Division III after the conference split in 1964 and became founding members of the NESCAC in 1971 where they still reside (as of 2014).

== Firsts ==
Aside from being the first official conference in the college hockey ranks, the Tri-State League also produced the first postseason conference game ever played when Clarkson and Middlebury tied at the end of the first season and were matched in a tie-breaker to determine the league champion. There wouldn't be another conference playoff game until the 1960 WCHA Men's Ice Hockey Tournament. When Rensselaer won the national title in 1954 it became only the second eastern school to do so, and the first to win as part of a conference (Boston College had won in 1949 as an independent).

== Members ==
Locations of all Tri-State League members

Institution	Nickname	Location	Founded	Tenure	Fate	Current conference
Clarkson University	Golden Knights	Potsdam, New York	1896	1950–1972	ECAC Hockey	
Colgate University	Red Raiders	Hamilton, New York	1819	1950–1951	Independent	ECAC Hockey
Middlebury College	Panthers	Middlebury, Vermont	1800	1950–1959	Independent	NESCAC
Rensselaer Polytechnic Institute	Engineers	Troy, New York	1824	1950–1972	ECAC Hockey	
St. Lawrence University	Saints	Canton, New York	1856	1950–1972	ECAC Hockey	
Williams College	Ephs	Williamstown, Massachusetts	1793	1950–1952	Independent	NESCAC
