= 1949–50 Colorado College Tigers men's ice hockey season =

National champion 1950 NCAA Tournament, champion
- Home ice: Broadmoor Ice Palace

Record
- Overall: 18–5–1
- Home: 13–2–1
- Road: 5–3
- Neutral: 2–0

Coaches and captains
- Head coach: Cheddy Thompson
- Captain: Milo Yalich

The 1949–50 Colorado College Tigers men's ice hockey team represented the Colorado College in intercollegiate college ice hockey during the 1949–50 NCAA men's ice hockey season. The head coach was Cheddy Thompson and the team captain was Milo Yalich. The team won the 1950 NCAA Men's Ice Hockey Tournament. The team's leading scorer was Harry Whitworth, who finished third in the nation with 60 points.

== Season ==
Colorado College entered the 1949–50 season looking for a bit of redemption after they lost their first three NCAA tournament games over the previous two seasons. With returning senior Milo Yalich named as team captain, the team opened on the road against the Wichita All-Stars before hosting the same team the following week. The first game was a close affair, with the Tigers winning 5–4 but the next three matches were easily won by Cheddy Thompson's team. The Tigers stayed at home until mid-January and used that advantage to win their first 10 games of the season. The visiting UBC Thunderbirds spoiled their perfect record, handing the Tigers their first two losses of the year but that series was sandwiched between two weekends against the brand new Denver program that was hopelessly outmatched by Colorado College. CC took all four games against their future rival by a combined score of 50–4. After splitting two games during a trip up to Minnesota the Tigers met their biggest competition in the west, the Michigan Wolverines.

CC had lost five of their previous six meetings against the Wolverines and hadn't beaten Michigan since 1946. In the first game Michigan shut down the high-powered CC offense, holding the Tigers to a season-low one goal in a 5–1 CC loss. The next day turned out even worse for the Tigers when they were trounced by Michigan 11–1. The bitter taste of those two losses remained in the team's mouth for two weeks but once they returned to the ice the team was able to take some of their frustration out on Minnesota, winning two games to end the regular season. While Michigan had the best record by far, Colorado College and North Dakota were in contention for the second western seed. While their two records were very similar (15–6–2 vs. 16–5–1) the series the two played against one another ended in CC's favor and was likely the deciding factor in sending the Tigers back to the NCAA tournament.

The Tigers welcomed Boston College in the semifinal and, after BC opened the scoring early in the first, Colorado College produced what was then the most lopsided victory in tournament history. The Tigers' Carl Lawrence gave the team its first lead and then proceeded to score four more times before the game was over. Ron Hartwell, Tony Frasca, Chris Ray and Bill MacDonald also hit the net as CC rolled to a 10–3 win, their first tournament victory. In the championship game CC faced off against Boston University who were in their first season playing varsity ice hockey and led by the nation's leading scorer Jack Garrity. Once again the Tigers surrendered the first goal and went into the second period down 1–0. CC remained off the score sheet until about midway through the game when they notched two goals in the span of 18 seconds and followed it up with a third just over six minutes later. With the game close through two periods there was still hope for both teams but, when Ron Hartwell scored 52 seconds in, the championship appeared to be slipping away from BU. Chris Ray built the lead to 4 before future Hall of Famer Jack Kelley made the score 5–2. After that brief respite the CC offense went on a rampage and scored seven goals in just under 7 minutes of game time with all but one coming from different players. Three more goals were scored before the game ended but the outcome had already been decided and Colorado College skated away with their first national championship.

CC set numerous records over the course of the season. With their 190 goals coming in only 24 games the team averaged just under 8 goals per game (7.91) which is the best rating in history for an NCAA champion (as of 2018). Colorado College twice broke the record for largest margin of victory in the NCAA tournament, winning 10–3 in their first game (+7) and 13–4 in their second (+9). As of 2018 the championship game has the second-widest margin (1961). The 13 goals CC scored in the championship set a record for most in any tournament game that was broken by Michigan in 1953 and remains a record for a championship game (tied with the 1957 CC team). The 23 goals scored in the tournament was a record that was not broken until the tournament expanded to at last double the number of games for a championship team, but still remains a record for any team in the Frozen Four. The +16 total goal differential is still a record for a single tournament that is shared by Michigan in 1953 and Wisconsin in 1983.

== Standings ==
1949–50 NCAA Independent ice hockey standings
	Intercollegiate							Overall					
	GP	W	L	T	Pct.	GF	GA	GP	W	L	T	GF	GA
American International	–	–	–	–	–	–	–	12	6	5	1	–	–
Army	11	3	8	0	.273	35	77	12	3	9	0	39	83
Boston College	–	–	–	–	–	–	–	19	14	5	0	122	83
Boston University	24	19	5	0	.792	170	70	24	19	5	0	170	70
Bowdoin	–	–	–	–	–	–	–	13	7	4	0	–	–
Brown	–	–	–	–	–	–	–	20	11	9	0	134	85
Clarkson	–	–	–	–	–	–	–	14	4	8	2	61	67
Colby	–	–	–	–	–	–	–	–	–	–	–	–	–
Colgate	–	–	–	–	–	–	–	15	7	7	1	63	83
Colorado College	16	12	3	1	.781	131	60	24	18	5	1	190	90
Dartmouth	–	–	–	–	–	–	–	20	11	9	0	93	86
Denver	–	–	–	–	–	–	–	17	4	13	0	50	202
Hamilton	–	–	–	–	–	–	–	13	4	9	0	–	–
Harvard	–	–	–	–	–	–	–	18	10	8	0	106	89
Lehigh	2	2	0	0	1.000	12	1	7	5	2	0	40	18
Massachusetts	–	–	–	–	–	–	–	7	2	3	2	31	45
Michigan	–	–	–	–	–	–	–	27	23	4	0	176	72
Michigan State	–	–	–	–	–	–	–	14	0	14	0	27	157
Michigan Tech	–	–	–	–	–	–	–	17	10	7	0	110	65
Middlebury	–	–	–	–	–	–	–	21	11	10	0	–	–
Minnesota	–	–	–	–	–	–	–	16	5	11	0	75	74
MIT	–	–	–	–	–	–	–	12	4	8	0	–	–
New Hampshire	–	–	–	–	–	–	–	4	0	4	0	8	28
North Dakota	–	–	–	–	–	–	–	23	15	6	2	147	95
North Dakota Agricultural	–	–	–	–	–	–	–	–	–	–	–	–	–
Northeastern	–	–	–	–	–	–	–	18	7	10	1	92	105
Norwich	–	–	–	–	–	–	–	10	6	4	0	–	–
Princeton	–	–	–	–	–	–	–	20	6	13	1	81	112
Rensselaer	–	–	–	–	–	–	–	10	4	6	0	40	58
Saint Michael's	–	–	–	–	–	–	–	7	4	3	0	46	35
St. Lawrence	–	–	–	–	–	–	–	9	9	0	0	67	32
Tufts	–	–	–	–	–	–	–	–	–	–	–	–	–
Williams	–	–	–	–	–	–	–	9	3	6	0	–	–
Wyoming	–	–	–	–	–	–	–	8	0	8	0	–	–
Yale	–	–	–	–	–	–	–	18	12	6	0	83	55

=== Schedule ===
During the season Colorado College compiled an 18–5–1 record, and was selected for the NCAA tournament for the third consecutive year.

Date	Opponent	Score	Result	Venue	Location	Record
Dec. 9, 1949	Wichita All-Stars	5–4	Win		Wichita, KS	1–0
Dec. 10, 1949	Wichita All-Stars	10–1	Win		Wichita, KS	2–0
Dec. 16, 1949	Wichita All-Stars	9–0	Win	Broadmoor Ice Palace	Colorado Springs, CO	3–0
Dec. 17, 1949	Wichita All-Stars	13–3	Win	Broadmoor Ice Palace	Colorado Springs, CO	4–0
Dec. 22, 1949	Saskatchewan	6–3	Win	Broadmoor Ice Palace	Colorado Springs, CO	5–0
Dec. 23, 1949	Saskatchewan	9–6	Win	Broadmoor Ice Palace	Colorado Springs, CO	6–0
Dec. 29, 1949	Brown	12–7	Win	Broadmoor Ice Palace	Colorado Springs, CO	7–0
Dec. 30, 1949	Brown	8–5	Win	Broadmoor Ice Palace	Colorado Springs, CO	8–0
Jan. 6, 1950	Denver	16–0	Win	Broadmoor Ice Palace	Colorado Springs, CO	9–0
Jan. 7, 1950	Denver	10–0	Win	Broadmoor Ice Palace	Colorado Springs, CO	10–0
Jan. 13, 1950	British Columbia	4–8	Loss	Broadmoor Ice Palace	Colorado Springs, CO	10–1
Jan. 14, 1950	British Columbia	3–5	Loss	Broadmoor Ice Palace	Colorado Springs, CO	10–2
Jan. 21, 1950	Denver	14–1	Win	DU Arena	Denver, CO	11–2
Jan. 30, 1950	Denver	10–3	Win	DU Arena	Denver, CO	12–2
Feb. 3, 1950	North Dakota	8–5	Win	Broadmoor Ice Palace	Colorado Springs, CO	13–2
Feb. 4, 1950	North Dakota	3–3*	tie	Broadmoor Ice Palace	Colorado Springs, CO	13–2–1
Feb. 10, 1950	Minnesota	8–6	Win	St. Paul Auditorium	Saint Paul, MN	14–2–1
Feb. 11, 1950	Minnesota	2–4	Loss	Mayo Civic Center	Rochester, MN	14–3–1
Feb. 17, 1950	Michigan	1–5	Loss	Weinberg Coliseum	Ann Arbor, MI	14–4–1
Feb. 18, 1950	Michigan	1–11	Loss	Weinberg Coliseum	Ann Arbor, MI	14–5–1
Mar. 3, 1950	Minnesota	9–2	Win	Broadmoor Ice Palace	Colorado Springs, CO	15–5–1
Mar. 4, 1950	Minnesota	6–1	Win	Broadmoor Ice Palace	Colorado Springs, CO	16–5–1
NCAA TOURNAMENT
March 16, 1950	Boston College	10–3	Win	Broadmoor World Arena	Colorado Springs, CO	17–5–1
March 18, 1950	Boston University	13–4	Win	Broadmoor World Arena	Colorado Springs, CO	18–5–1
		190–90				18–5–1

* Denotes overtime periods

== Roster and scoring statistics ==
No.	Name	Year	Position	Hometown	S/P/C	Games	Goals	Assists	Pts	PIM
	Harry Whitworth	Senior	C	Toronto, ON	(Ontario)	24	25	35	60	14
	Chris Ray	Junior	F	Belmont, MA	(Massachusetts)	24	31	13	44	19
	Ron Hartwell	Sophomore	RW	Swan Lake, MB	(Manitoba)	24	28	13	41	2
	Andy Gambucci	Sophomore	F	Eveleth, MN	(Minnesota)	–	25	5	30	30
	Bud Eastwood	Sophomore	LW	Saskatoon, SK	(Saskatchewan)	–	5	18	23	18
	Milo Yalich	Senior	D	Buhl, MN	(Minnesota)	–	15	7	22	26
	Jim Starrak	Junior	D	Moose Jaw, SK	(Saskatchewan)	–	14	7	21	27
	Cameron Berry	Sophomore	F	New Westminster, BC	(British Columbia)	–	4	11	15	12
	John Schleicher	Senior	C	New Haven, CT	(Connecticut)	–	4	11	15	22
	Bill MacDonald	Senior	LW	Hamden, CT	(Connecticut)	–	4	6	10	2
	Leonard Maccini	Freshman	D	Wellesley, MA	(Massachusetts)	–	2	6	8	19
	Carl Lawrence	Freshman	D	Waterloo, ON	(Ontario)	–	4	3	7	8
	Gordon Atkinson	Junior	F	Rimbey, AB	(Alberta)	–	3	3	6	10
	Tony Frasca	Sophomore	F	Cambridge, MA	(Massachusetts)	24	34	–	–	10
	Clark Wilder	Senior	G	Rochester, MN	(Minnesota)	12	–	–	–	–
	William Dewire	Sophomore	G	Cambridge, MA	(Massachusetts)	6	–	–	–	–
	Roy Ikola	Senior	G	Eveleth, MN	(Minnesota)	4	–	–	–	–
Total							190			

- The team scored 190 goals over the course of the season, however, there are 194 goals collectively attributed to the players. These extra goals may have come from the alumni game that officially counts as an exhibition game.

== Goaltending Statistics ==
No.	Name	Games	Minutes	Wins	Losses	Ties	Goals against	Saves	Shut outs	SV %	GAA
	Clark Wilder	12	–	–	–	–	–	–	–	–	–
	William Dewire	6	–	–	–	–	–	–	–	–	–
	Roy Ikola	4	–	–	–	–	–	–	–	–	–
Total		24	–	–	–	–	–	–	–	–	–

== 1950 national championship ==
=== (W2) Colorado College vs. (E2) Boston University ===
March 18	Colorado College	13 – 4	Boston University	Broadmoor Ice Palace

Scoring summary
Period	Team	Goal	Assist(s)	Time	Score
1st	BU	Joe Czarnotta	Garrity	6:16	1–0 BU
2nd	CC	Harry Whitworth	Starrak	27:53	1–1
2nd	CC	Carl Lawrence	Frasca and Berry	28:05	2–1 CC
2nd	CC	Chris Ray	Hartwell and Yalich	34:27	3–1 CC
3rd	CC	Ron Hartwell – GW	unassisted	40:52	4–1 CC
3rd	CC	Chris Ray	Whitworth	45:26	5–1 CC
3rd	BU	Jack Kelley	Garrity	46:47	5–2 CC
3rd	CC	Harry Whitworth	Ray and Hartwell	49:49	6–2 CC
3rd	CC	Chris Ray	Whitworth	51:20	7–2 CC
3rd	CC	Ron Hartwell	Whitworth and Ray	51:34	8–2 CC
3rd	CC	Tony Frasca	Berry and MacDonald	53:03	9–2 CC
3rd	CC	Cameron Berry	Frasca and MacDonald	53:18	10–2 CC
3rd	CC	Jim Starrak	unassisted	56:15	11–2 CC
3rd	CC	Chris Ray	unassisted	56:39	12–2 CC
3rd	BU	Jack Garrity	Kelley	58:21	12–3 CC
3rd	CC	Tony Frasca	Lawrence	58:29	13–3 CC
3rd	BU	Bob Bell	Robinson and Bradley	59:56	13–4 CC
Penalty summary
Period	Team	Player	Penalty	Time	PIM
1st	BU	William Jurgelevich			2:00
1st	BU	Lloyd Robinson			2:00
1st	BU	Jack Garrity			2:00
1st	CC	Jim Starrak			2:00
1st	CC	Milo Yalich			2:00
1st	CC	Bud Eastwood			2:00
2nd	BU	Jack Kelley			2:00
2nd	BU	Joe Folino			2:00
2nd	BU	Joe Czarnotta			5:00
2nd	CC	Tony Frasca			2:00
3rd	CC	Leonard Maccini			2:00
3rd	CC	William MacDonald			2:00

Shots by period
Team	1	2	3	T
Colorado College	10	15	18	43
Boston University	9	6	11	26

Goaltenders
Team	Name	Saves	Goals against	Time on ice
CC	Roy Ikola	22	4	
BU	Ralph Bevins	30	13	

Jim Starrak and Tony Frasca were named to the All-Tournament First Team while Roy Ikola and Ron Hartwell were on the All-Tournament Second Team

== See also ==
- 1950 NCAA Division I Men's Ice Hockey Tournament
- List of NCAA Division I Men's Ice Hockey Tournament champions
