= List of Colorado College Tigers men's ice hockey seasons =

This is a season-by-season list of records compiled by Colorado College in men's ice hockey.

Colorado College has won in its history two Division I NCAA Men's Ice Hockey Championships: in 1950 and 1957. Colorado College never missed a season of play since 1938 except during World War II.

== Season-by-season results ==
Note: GP = Games played, W = Wins, L = Losses, T = Ties

NCAA D-I Champions	NCAA Frozen Four	Conference regular season champions	Conference Playoff Champions

Season	Conference	Regular Season (Note: Code explanation; GP—Games Played, W—Wins, L—Losses, T—Tied games, OTW—Overtime Wins, OTL—Overtime Loses, 3/SW—Win in 3 on 3 overtime or shootout, Pts—Points*)														Conference Tournament Results	National Tournament Results
Season	Conference	Conference									Overall					Conference Tournament Results	National Tournament Results
Season	Conference	GP	W	L	T	OTW	OTL	3/SW	Pts*	Finish	GP	W	L	T	%	Conference Tournament Results	National Tournament Results
John Atwood (1937 — 1938)
1937–38	Independent	–	–	–	–	–	–	–	–	–	12	3	9	0	.250		
Garrett Livingston (1938 — 1942)
1938–39	Independent	–	–	–	–	–	–	–	–	–	11	8	3	0	.727		
1939–40	Independent	–	–	–	–	–	–	–	–	–	12	7	3	2	.667		
1940–41	Independent	–	–	–	–	–	–	–	–	–	20	10	9	1	.525		
1941–42	Independent	–	–	–	–	–	–	–	–	–	15	6	6	3	.500		
Program suspended due to World War II
C. E. Moore (1944 — 1945)
1944–45	Independent	–	–	–	–	–	–	–	–	–	5	1	3	1	.300		
Cheddy Thompson (1945 — 1955)
1945–46	Independent	–	–	–	–	–	–	–	–	–	11	3	8	0	.273		
1946–47	Independent	–	–	–	–	–	–	–	–	–	19	14	5	0	.737		
1947–48	Independent	–	–	–	–	–	–	–	–	–	27	19	8	0	.704		Lost Semifinal 4–8 (Dartmouth)
1948–49	Independent	–	–	–	–	–	–	–	–	–	23	15	7	1	.674		Lost Semifinal 3–7 (Boston College); Lost Consolation Game 4–10 (Michigan)
1949–50	Independent	–	–	–	–	–	–	–	–	–	24	18	5	1	.771		Won Semifinal 10–3 (Boston College); Won Championship 13–4 (Boston University)
1950–51	Independent	–	–	–	–	–	–	–	–	–	25	16	8	1	.611		Lost Semifinal 4–8 (Brown); Lost Consolation Game 4–7 (Boston University)
1951–52	MCHA	12	10	2	0	–	–	–	20	1st	25	19	5	1	.764		Won Semifinal 4–3 (Yale); Lost Championship 1–4 (Michigan)
1952–53	MCHA	14	4	10	0	–	–	–	8	5th	20	9	11	0	.450		
1953–54	WIHL	14	6	8	0	–	–	–	11	T–4th	24	14	9	1	.604		
1954–55	WIHL	18	14	4	0	–	–	–	19	1st	28	22	6	0	.786		Won Semifinal 2–1 (St. Lawrence); Lost Championship 3–5 (Michigan)
Tom Bedecki (1955 — 1958)
1955–56	WIHL	18	10	8	0	–	–	–	14	3rd	28	17	11	0	.607		
1956–57	WIHL	18	14	4	0	–	–	–	19	1st	30	25	5	0	.833		Won Semifinal 5–3 (Clarkson); Won Championship 13–6 (Michigan)
1957–58	WIHL	20	11	9	0	–	–	–	15	3rd	30	17	12	1	.583		
Tony Frasca (1958 — 1963)
1958–59	Independent	–	–	–	–	–	–	–	–	–	23	6	14	3	.326		
1959–60	WCHA	20	8	12	0	–	–	–	.400	4th	26	8	17	1	.327	Lost Final series 3–12 (Denver)	
1960–61	WCHA	22	4	18	0	–	–	–	.182	7th	24	4	20	0	.167		
1961–62	WCHA	18	0	18	0	–	–	–	.000	7th	23	0	23	0	.000		
1962–63	WCHA	16	6	10	0	–	–	–	.375	T–5th	23	12	11	0	.522		
Bob Johnson (1963 — 1966)
1963–64	WCHA	16	4	11	1	–	–	–	.281	6th	26	11	14	1	.442		
University Division
1964–65	WCHA	16	2	14	0	–	–	–	.125	7th	25	7	17	1	.300		
1965–66	WCHA	20	4	12	2	–	–	–	.278	7th	29	9	18	2	.345	Lost First round 2–8 (Denver)	
John Matchefts (1966 — 1971)
1966–67	WCHA	18	6	12	0	–	–	–	.333	7th	29	15	13	1	.534	Lost First round 3–6 (Denver)	
1967–68	WCHA	20	4	16	0	–	–	–	.200	7th	29	9	20	0	.310	Lost First round 2–5 (Michigan Tech)	
1968–69	WCHA	18	4	14	0	–	–	–	.222	7th	28	12	16	0	.429	Won regional semifinal 5–4 (North Dakota); Lost Final 1–3 (Denver)	
1969–70	WCHA	20	3	17	0	–	–	–	.150	9th	30	7	22	1	.250		
1970–71	WCHA	18	7	11	0	–	–	–	.389	8th	29	11	17	1	.397	Lost regional semifinal 3–6 (Denver)	
Jeff Sauer (1971 — 1982)
1971–72	WCHA	28	11	17	0	–	–	–	28	9th	32	13	19	0	.406		
1972–73	WCHA	28	5	23	0	–	–	–	14	9th	34	10	24	0	.294		
Division I
1973–74	WCHA	29	10	16	2	–	–	–	22	9th	32	13	17	2	.438		
1974–75	WCHA	32	21	11	0	–	–	–	42	3rd	39	23	16	0	.590	Lost First round series 11–13 (Michigan)	
1975–76	WCHA	32	15	16	1	–	–	–	31	6th	38	15	22	1	.408	Lost First round series 5–12 (Minnesota)	
1976–77	WCHA	32	11	20	1	–	–	–	23	T–8th	40	13	25	2	.350	Lost First round series 2–6 (Wisconsin)	
1977–78	WCHA	32	13	19	0	–	–	–	26	T–5th	41	18	22	1	.451	Won First round series 8–7 (Minnesota); Won Final Series 9–7 (Denver)	Lost First round 3–5 (Bowling Green)
1978–79	WCHA	32	12	20	0	–	–	–	24	8th	38	12	24	2	.342	Lost First round series 6–13 (North Dakota)	
1979–80	WCHA	20	16	13	1	–	–	–	.550	3rd	39	21	17	1	.551	Won First round series 11–9 (Minnesota–Duluth); Lost Final Series 4–13 (Minnesota)	
1980–81	WCHA	28	12	16	0	–	–	–	24	7th	36	17	19	0	.472	Won First round series 13–12 (Wisconsin); Lost Final Series 10–14 (Minnesota)	
1981–82	WCHA	26	6	18	2	–	–	–	14	6th	36	11	23	2	.333	Lost First round series 4–9 (Minnesota)	
Mike Bertsch (1982 — 1988)
1982–83	WCHA	26	2	24	0	–	–	–	4	6th	35	6	28	1	.186	Lost First round series 4–8 (Wisconsin)	
1983–84	WCHA	26	5	21	0	–	–	–	10	6th	35	9	25	1	.271	Lost First round series 2–7 (Minnesota)	
1984–85	WCHA	34	15	19	0	–	–	–	30	6th	38	17	21	0	.447	Lost First round series 4–9 (Wisconsin)	
1985–86	WCHA	34	11	21	2	–	–	–	24	7th	40	12	26	2	.325	Lost First round series 7–14 (Minnesota)	
1986–87	WCHA	35	12	22	1	–	–	–	25	6th	42	17	24	1	.417	Won First round series 7–4 (Denver); Lost Semifinal series 4–7 (North Dakota)	
1987–88	WCHA	35	3	31	1	–	–	–	7	8th	38	4	33	1	.118	Lost First round series 0–2 (Minnesota)	
Brad Buetow (1988 — 1993)
1988–89	WCHA	35	9	23	3	–	–	–	21	8th	40	11	26	3	.313	Lost First round series 0–2 (Minnesota)	
1989–90	WCHA	28	10	17	1	–	–	–	21	7th	40	18	20	2	.475	Lost First round series 0–2 (Minnesota)	
1990–91	WCHA	32	9	22	1	–	–	–	19	8th	40	13	26	1	.338	Lost First round series 0–2 (Northern Michigan)	
1991–92	WCHA	32	14	14	4	–	–	–	32	4th	41	18	18	5	.500	Won First round series 2–1 (Minnesota–Duluth); Lost Semifinal 1–5 (Minnesota); Lost Third-place game 3–5 (Wisconsin)	
1992–93	WCHA	32	6	26	0	–	–	–	12	9th	36	8	28	0	.222	Lost First round series 0–2 (Wisconsin)	
Don Lucia (1993 — 1999)
1993–94	WCHA	32	18	9	5	–	–	–	41	1st	39	23	11	5	.654	Lost First round series 1–2 (Michigan Tech)	
1994–95	WCHA	32	22	9	1	–	–	–	45	T–1st	43	30	12	1	.709	Won First round series 2–0 (Alaska–Anchorage); Won Semifinal 5–4 (Minnesota); Lost Championship 3–4 (Wisconsin)	Lost regional semifinal 2–5 (Minnesota)
1995–96	WCHA	32	26	2	4	–	–	–	56	1st	42	33	5	4	.833	Won First round series 2–0 (Northern Michigan); Lost Semifinal 3–4 (Michigan Tech); Won Third-place game 6–4 (Wisconsin)	Won regional semifinal 5–3 (Massachusetts–Lowell); Won Semifinal 4–3 (Vermont); Lost Championship 2–3 (Michigan)
1996–97	WCHA	32	17	11	4	–	–	–	38	T–4th	44	25	15	4	.614	Won First round series 2–0 (Wisconsin); Won Quarterfinal 5–2 (Denver); Lost Semifinal 1–5 (North Dakota); Lost Third-place game 0–6 (St. Cloud State)	Won regional quarterfinal 3–2 (New Hampshire); Won regional semifinal 5–4 (Clarkson); Lost Semifinal 2–6 (North Dakota)
1997–98	WCHA	28	16	10	2	–	–	–	34	3rd	42	26	13	3	.655	Won First round series 2–0 (Denver); Lost Semifinal 2–5 (Wisconsin); Won Third-place game 6–1 (St. Cloud State)	Won regional quarterfinal 3–1 (Clarkson); Lost regional semifinal 1–6 (Boston College)
1998–99	WCHA	28	20	8	0	–	–	–	40	2nd	42	29	12	1	.702	Won First round series 2–0 (Minnesota–Duluth); Lost Semifinal 2–3 (Denver); Won Third-place game 7–4 (Minnesota)	Won regional quarterfinal 5–2 (St. Lawrence); Lost regional semifinal 2–5 (Michigan State)
Scott Owens (1999 — 2014)
1999–00	WCHA	28	14	11	3	–	–	–	31	5th	39	18	18	3	.500	Lost First round series 0–2 (Minnesota)	
2000–01	WCHA	28	17	11	0	–	–	–	34	4th	41	27	13	1	.671	Won First round series 2–0 (Minnesota State–Mankato); Won Quarterfinal 4–3 (Wisconsin); Lost Semifinal 1–2 (North Dakota); Won Third-place game 5–4 (Minnesota)	Won regional quarterfinal 3–2 (St. Lawrence); Lost regional semifinal 1–4 (North Dakota)
2001–02	WCHA	28	16	10	2	–	–	–	34	4th	43	27	13	3	.663	Won First round series 2–0 (Alaska–Anchorage); Won Quarterfinal 3–2 (Wisconsin); Lost Semifinal 0–3 (Denver); Won Third-place game 2–1 (St. Cloud State)	Lost regional semifinal 3–4 (Maine)
2002–03	WCHA	28	19	4	5	–	–	–	43	1st	42	30	7	5	.774	Won First round series 2–0 (Alaska–Anchorage); Won Semifinal 4–3 (Minnesota–Duluth); Lost Championship 2–4 (Minnesota)	Won regional semifinal 4–2 (Wayne State); Lost Regional Final 3–5 (Michigan)
2003–04	WCHA	28	11	15	2	–	–	–	24	7th	39	20	16	3	.551	Won First round series 2–0 (Denver); Lost Quarterfinal 1–4 (Alaska–Anchorage)	
2004–05	WCHA	28	19	7	2	–	–	–	40	T–1st	43	31	9	3	.756	Won First round series 2–0 (St. Cloud State); Won Semifinal 3–0 (Minnesota); Lost Championship 0–1 (Denver)	Won regional semifinal 6–5 (Colgate); Won Regional Final 4–3 (Michigan); Lost Semifinal 2–6 (Denver)
2005–06	WCHA	28	15	11	2	–	–	–	32	T–4th	42	24	16	2	.595	Lost First round series 0–2 (St. Cloud State)	Lost regional semifinal 2–3 (Cornell)
2006–07	WCHA	28	13	12	3	–	–	–	29	5th	39	18	17	4	.513	Lost First round series 1–2 (Michigan Tech)	
2007–08	WCHA	28	21	6	1	–	–	–	43	1st	41	28	12	1	.679	Won First round series 2–0 (Alaska–Anchorage); Lost Semifinal 1–2 (Minnesota); Lost Third-place game 2–4 (North Dakota)	Lost regional semifinal 1–3 (Michigan State)
2008–09	WCHA	28	12	9	7	–	–	–	31	T–3rd	38	16	12	10	.553	Lost First round series 0–2 (Minnesota–Duluth)	
2009–10	WCHA	28	12	13	3	–	–	–	27	6th	39	19	17	3	.526	Lost First round series 1–2 (Minnesota–Duluth)	
2010–11	WCHA	28	13	13	2	–	–	–	28	6th	45	23	19	3	.544	Won First round series 2–1 (Wisconsin); Won Quarterfinal 4–2 (Alaska–Anchorage); Lost Semifinal 3–4 (North Dakota)	Won regional semifinal 8-4 (Boston College) Lost regional final 1-2 (Michigan)
2011–12	WCHA	28	15	12	1	–	–	–	31	5th	36	18	16	2	.528	Lost First round series 0–2 (Michigan Tech)	
2012–13	WCHA	28	11	13	4	–	–	–	26	8th	42	18	19	5	.488	Won First round series 2–1 (Denver); Won Quarterfinal 4–3 (North Dakota); Won Semifinal 2–0 (Minnesota); Lost Championship 2–3 (Wisconsin)	
2013–14	NCHC	24	6	13	5	–	–	1	24	7th	37	7	24	6	.270	Lost Quarterfinal series 1–2 (North Dakota)	
Mike Haviland (2014 — 2021)
2014–15	NCHC	24	2	19	3	–	–	1	27	8th	35	6	26	3	.214	Lost Quarterfinal series 0–2 (North Dakota)	
2015–16	NCHC	24	4	19	1	–	–	0	13	8th	36	6	29	1	.181	Lost Quarterfinal series 0–2 (North Dakota)	
2016–17	NCHC	24	4	16	4	–	–	1	17	8th	34	8	24	4	.278	Lost Quarterfinal series 0–2 (Denver)	
2017–18	NCHC	24	8	12	4	–	–	3	31	T–5th	37	15	17	5	.486	Lost Quarterfinal series 1–2 (Denver)	
2018–19	NCHC	24	9	12	3	–	–	0	30	6th	41	17	20	4	.463	Won Quarterfinal series, 2–1 (Western Michigan); Lost Semifinal, 2–5 (St. Cloud State); Lost Third-place game, 1–6 (Denver)	
2019–20	NCHC	24	4	17	3	–	–	1	16	8th	34	11	20	3	.368	Tournament Cancelled	
2020–21	NCHC	22	4	16	2	0	2	2	.273	7th	23	4	17	2	.217	Lost Quarterfinal, 1–2 (St. Cloud State)	
Kris Mayotte (2021 — Present)
2021–22	NCHC	24	6	17	1	2	1	0	18	7th	36	9	24	3	.292	Lost Quarterfinal, 0–2 (North Dakota)	
2022–23	NCHC	24	6	15	3	0	2	2	25	7th	38	13	22	3	.382	Won Quarterfinal series, 2–0 (Western Michigan); Won Semifinal, 1–0 (Denver); Lost Championship, 0–3 (St. Cloud State)	
2023–24	NCHC	24	14	8	2	5	2	0	41	T–3rd	37	21	13	3	.608	Lost Quarterfinal series, 1–2 (Omaha)	
2024–25	NCHC	24	11	12	1	4	1	1	32	6th	37	18	18	1	.500	Lost Quarterfinal series, 1–2 (Denver)	
Totals											GP	W	L	T	%	Championships	
Regular Season											2601	1189	1267	155	.485	9 MCHA / WIHL / WCHA Championships	
Conference Post-season											172	64	97	1	.398	1 WCHA tournament championship	
NCAA Post-season											38	18	20	0	.474	19 NCAA Tournament appearances	
Regular Season and Post-season Record											2811	1271	1384	156	.480	2 NCAA Division I National Championships	

* Winning percentage is used when conference schedules are unbalanced.
bold and italic are program records
