= Harry Cleverly =

Biographical details
- Born: February 21, 1912; Hull, Massachusetts, U.S.
- Died: December 3, 1968 (aged 56); Brattleboro, Vermont, U.S.

Playing career
- 1935–1937: Boston University

Coaching career (HC unless noted)

Men's ice hockey
- 1945–1962: Boston University
- 1965–1966: Babson

Baseball
- 1943: Boston University
- 1951–1962: Boston University

Head coaching record
- Overall: 217-147-10

Accomplishments and honors

Awards
- 1958 Spencer Penrose Award; 1959 Boston University Athletic Hall of Fame

Harry Leighton Cleverly (February 21, 1912 – December 3, 1968) was an American college ice hockey and baseball coach for the varsity programs at Boston University for twelve seasons. He was also the head coach of the freshman football squad for his alma mater.

== Career ==
Harry Cleverly came to Boston University in the 1930s, joining the ice hockey squad in 1935 and playing two seasons for the Terriers before graduating in 1937. Cleverly joined the staff of his former coach, Wayland Vaughan, as an assistant as well as joining the military before Boston University offered him the top job for both the ice hockey and baseball programs after World War II.

The reconstituted ice hockey program played only 3 games in 1945-46 before returning to a more normal schedule the following season. While the Terriers had played well prior to his installation, it wasn't until Cleverly was in charge that Boston University became a power in ice hockey. In his first three full seasons Cleverly got the Terriers to post school records in both wins and winning percentage and with the program firing on all cylinders the Athletic Department made the move to shift the team from a club sport to a Division I squad. Beginning in 1949–50 Cleverly set the Terriers up to compete with the other national powers, making the recently created NCAA tournament the first chance they had. The Terriers downed Michigan in the semifinal but were unable to overcome a monstrous 10-goal third period by Colorado College in the national final.

Cleverly continued coaching BU to a high level, reaching the tournament three more times, but was unable to get them back to the title game. Cleverly remained as the Terriers coach until 1962, staying on just long enough to see them be a founding member of ECAC Hockey before he resigned from his positions on both the hockey and baseball teams. After leaving BU, Cleverly agreed to coach a newly created ice hockey program at Babson College for the 1965-66 season before turning it over to his successor Dave Coleman. Tragedy struck two years later when Cleverly was killed in a car accident in Vermont.

During his tenure as ice hockey coach Cleverly was awarded with the Spencer Penrose Award in 1958 and inducted into the Boston University Athletic Hall of Fame the following year.

== Head coaching record ==
Statistics overview
Season	Team	Overall	Conference	Standing	Postseason
Boston University Terriers Independent (1945–1961)
1945-46	Boston University	2-0-1			
1946-47	Boston University	15-5-1			
1947-48	Boston University	20-4-0			
1948-49	Boston University	13-7-0			
1949-50	Boston University	19-5-0			NCAA Runner-Up
1950-51	Boston University	16-5-0			NCAA Consolation Game (Win)
1951-52	Boston University	15-3-1			
1952-53	Boston University	14-7-1			NCAA Consolation Game (Loss)
1953-54	Boston University	4-15-1			
1954-55	Boston University	4-19-0			
1955-56	Boston University	11-11-0			
1956-57	Boston University	13-9-1			
1957-58	Boston University	17-5-1			
1958-59	Boston University	13-8-2			
1959-60	Boston University	19-8-0			NCAA Consolation Game (Win)
1960-61	Boston University	10-14-0			
Boston University:		205-125-9			
Boston University Terriers (ECAC Hockey) (1961–1962)
1961-62	Boston University	7-17-1	7-16-1	22nd	
Boston University:		7-17-1	7-16-1		
Babson Beavers Independent (1965–1966)
1965–66	Babson	5–5–0			
Babson:		5–5–0			
Total:		217-147-10			
National champion Postseason invitational champion Conference regular season champion Conference regular season and conference tournament champion Division regular season champion Division regular season and conference tournament champion Conference tournament champion

Awards and achievements
Preceded by Jack Riley	Spencer Penrose Award; 1957–58	Succeeded by John Kelley
