= Dick Starrak =

Canadian ice hockey player

- Born: May 26, 1927 Moose Jaw, Saskatchewan, Canada
- Died: February 6, 2010 (aged 82) Hanover, New Hampshire, United States
- Position: Forward/Defenseman
- Played for: Michigan
- Playing career: 1945–1950

Richard Bonar Starrak (1927-2010) was a Canadian ice hockey forward and defenseman who played for Michigan.

== Career ==
Starrak started his college career in 1945 just as many college hockey programs were restarting after World War II. After joining the varsity team in his sophomore year he helped lay the foundation for the Wolveines to be the dominant power for college hockey. The NCAA instituted a national tournament for the 1948 season and Starrak helped Michigan win the inaugural tournament. After graduating he played one year of minor hockey before retiring as a player.

He worked for several companies in the lumber industry over the course of his professional career including the Capilano Timber Company in Vancouver. He eventually rose to become the president of the George McQuesten Lumber Company and retired to live in Boxford, Massachusetts.

== Personal life ==
Starrak's brother Jim Starrak also played college hockey, winning a national championship with Colorado College.

== Awards and honors ==
| Award | Year |
|---|---|
| AHCA First Team All-American | 1948–49 |
