= Buzz Johnson (ice hockey) =

American ice hockey player

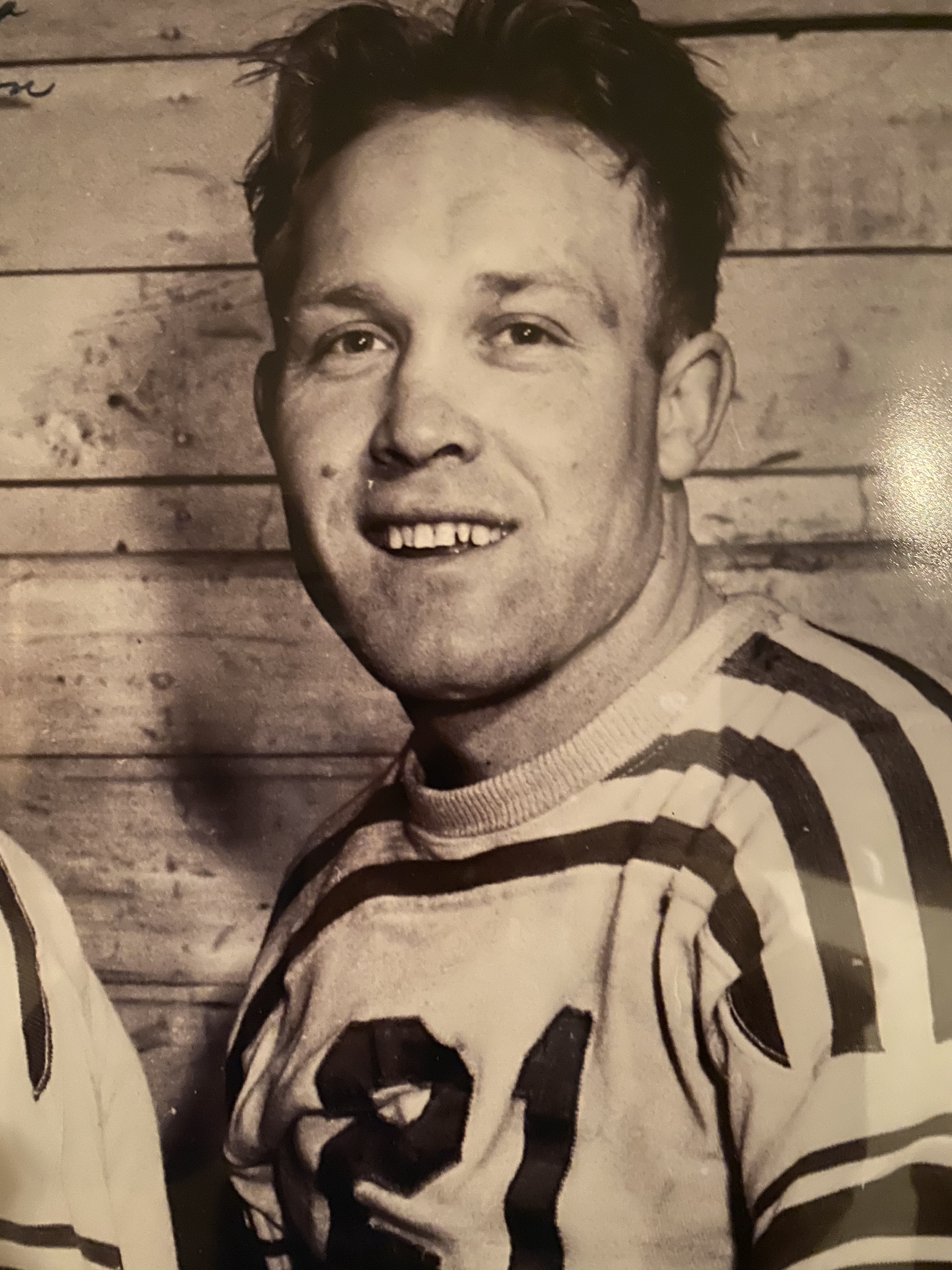
- Born: November 9, 1921 Grand Forks, North Dakota, U.S.
- Died: February 14, 2006 (aged 84) San Diego, California, U.S.
- Position: Center
- Played for: North Dakota
- Playing career: 1947–1950
Medal record
World Championship
Representing United States
Bronze medal – third place	1949 Stockholm	Ice hockey
Silver medal – second place	1950 London	Ice hockey

Russell "Buzz" LaVonne Johnson (November 9, 1921 – February 14, 2006) was an American ice hockey Center who played for North Dakota after World War II.

== Career ==
When North Dakota was preparing to bring back its ice hockey program after World War II, brothers Buzz and Prince Johnson were playing amateur hockey for the Grand Forks Amerks and came to the attention of Cal Marvin, who was leading the effort to rekindle the team. Both players began attending the University of North Dakota and made their debuts in the 1947–48 season. The team played well with Johnson on the team, posting their first double-digit win season. The team flagged the following year because Johnson had played well enough to be included on the US national team for the 1949 Ice Hockey World Championships. While missing the entire season for North Dakota, Johnson was nearly a point-per-game player over eight games as the US won the bronze medal. He did, however, have an even greater impact after the championship was over; Zdeněk Marek, a member of the gold-medal-winning Czech team, had decided to hide in Stockholm rather than return to Czechoslovakia because he was not a member of the Communist Party. During his time playing for the team he had confided his trepidation at returning home to Johnson and his brother. The two promised to assist Marek in earning a student visa so he could defect to the United States. The plan came to fruition when North Dakota offered Marek a scholarship on July 12, 1949. Marek was eventually granted permanent resident status by an act of congress and lived in the United States until his death in 2019.

For his senior season, Johnson helped North Dakota to a 15-6-2 record, finishing just behind Colorado College for the second western seed in the NCAA tournament. Johnson's 50-point campaign set a new program record that he shared with his brother and he became one of the first two players in North Dakota history to be named as an AHCA All-American.

After the college season had finished, Johnson was again a member of Team USA at the 1950 Ice Hockey World Championships and finished second on the team in scoring to help the US to a Silver medal. He was unable to repeat his diplomatic coup as the entire Czech team had been prevented from leaving the country when the government discovered that several players were planning a similar tactic as Marek.

Johnson was inducted into the North Dakota hall of fame in 1981.

== Statistics ==
=== Regular season and playoffs ===
			Regular season					Playoffs
Season	Team	League	GP	G	A	Pts	PIM	GP	G	A	Pts	PIM
1947–48	North Dakota	NCAA	15	8	8	16	8	—	—	—	—	—
1948–49	North Dakota	NCAA	DNP					DNP
1949–50	North Dakota	NCAA	23	27	23	50	43	—	—	—	—	—
NCAA totals			38	35	31	66	—	—	—	—	—	—

=== International ===
Year	Team	GP	G	A	Pts	PIM
1949	United States	8	3	4	7	6
1950	United States	7	6	10	16	10
Totals		15	9	14	23	16

== Awards and honors ==
Award	Year
AHCA Second Team All-American	1949–50
