= Jim Starrak =

Canadian-born American ice hockey player

- Born: November 15, 1928 Moose Jaw, Saskatchewan, CAN
- Died: February 27, 2013 (aged 84) Coleman, Texas, US
- Position: Defenseman
- Played for: Colorado College
- Playing career: 1948–1951

Roy James Starrak (November 15, 1928 – February 27, 2013) was a Canadian-born American ice hockey defenseman who played for Colorado College.

== Career ==
Starrak's collegiate career began in 1947 with the Freshman team at Colorado College. He joined the varsity team the following year and promptly became a fixture for the Tigers. Starrak was named to the AHCA First Team All-Americans in each of his three varsity seasons, becoming the first player to achieve that feat. In his junior season Starrak helped CC produce one of the greatest offensive seasons in college hockey history. The Tigers reached the NCAA Tournament for the third consecutive season and ran roughshod over their opponents. Colorado College scored double-digit goals in both games and won the program's first National Championship.

After graduating he worked as a geologist in the oil industry, mostly for Getty Oil. At the time of his retirement he was the Senior Vice President of Production.

== Personal life ==
Jim's older brother Dick Starrak also played college hockey.

Starrak became a US citizen in 1970. He was first married to Jean Pringle, whom he met at Colorado College. They had two sons, Jim and Ward. The marriage to his second wife Evelyn Tucker, lasted from December 1987 until her death in February 2005. Jim then married Jolene Trolinder the following November.

== Statistics ==
=== Regular season and playoffs ===
			Regular season					Playoffs
Season	Team	League	GP	G	A	Pts	PIM	GP	G	A	Pts	PIM
1948–49	Colorado College	NCAA	—	—	—	—	—	—	—	—	—	—
1949–50	Colorado College	NCAA	—	14	7	21	27	—	—	—	—	—
1950–51	Colorado College	NCAA	—	11	23	38	—	—	—	—	—	—
NCAA totals			—	—	—	—	—	—	—	—	—	—

== Awards and honors ==
Award	Year
AHCA First Team All-American	1948–49
AHCA First Team All-American	1949–50
NCAA All-Tournament Second Team	1950
AHCA First Team All-American	1950–51
NCAA All-Tournament Second Team	1951
