= Ron Hartwell =

Canadian ice hockey player

- Born: Swan Lake, Manitoba, CAN
- Died: July 20, 2016 (aged 88)
- Position: Right Wing
- Played for: Colorado College
- Playing career: 1949–1952

Ron Hartwell was a Canadian ice hockey right wing who helped Colorado College win its first national championship in 1950.

== Career ==
Hartwell Began attending Colorado College in 1948 and joined the varsity hockey team after a year with the freshman squad. Hartwell joined a club that had made the NCAA tournament in consecutive years but had yet to win a game in the championship. He brought a scoring touch to an already powerful team that allowed CC to produce one of the greatest offensive seasons in NCAA history. Hartwell contributed 24 goals in 22 games as the Tigers made their third consecutive appearance and added 4 more goals in two tournament games as Colorado College set numerous NCAA records (many still standing) with 23 goals in their two tournament games. Hartwell was named to the NCAA All-Tournament Second Team after winning the first national championship in school history.

For his second season with the team Hartwell came into his own, scoring a then-team-record 44 goals (second most as of 2020) and led the team with 62 points. CC made the tournament with a 16–6–1 record but their defense failed them, allowing 15 goals over two games to finish fourth. Hartwell was again the top team scorer in his senior season, finishing second in the nation in both goals (40) and points (67). That season CC won the inaugural MCHL championship and received the top western seed in the national tournament (their fifth straight appearance). The team made its second championship game that year but was unable to solve Michigan in the final, losing 1–4. Hartwell ended his college career with 112 goals in 74 games, breaking the career NCAA record. While he has been surpassed by several players over the years, Hartwell is still the goal scoring leader for Colorado College (as of 2020) despite appearing in far fewer games than most succeeding players.

After graduating, Hartwell became a geologist and worked in the oil industry. He made a name for himself for finding large oil deposits and was able to start his own exploration company in the 1960s. He retired at age 70 when sold his firm, HartWell Petrolium Ltd. in 1997.

== Statistics ==
=== Regular season and playoffs ===
| | | | Regular season | | | | | Playoffs |
| Season | Team | League | GP | G | A | Pts | PIM | GP | G | A | Pts | PIM |
|---|---|---|---|---|---|---|---|---|---|---|---|---|
| 1949–50 | Colorado College | NCAA | 24 | 28 | 13 | 41 | 2 | — | — | — | — | — |
| 1950–51 | Colorado College | NCAA | 25 | 44 | 18 | 62 | — | — | — | — | — | — |
| 1951–52 | Colorado College | MCHL | 25 | 40 | 27 | 67 | 20 | — | — | — | — | — |
| NCAA totals | | | 74 | 112 | 58 | 170 | — | — | — | — | — | — |

== Awards and honors ==
| Award | Year |
|---|---|
| NCAA All-Tournament Second Team | 1950 |
| All-MCHL First Team | 1951–52 |
| AHCA First Team All-American | 1951–52 |
