= NCAA Division I men's ice hockey tournament =

United States National Collegiate Hockey Championship Tournament

NCAA Division I men’s ice hockey tournament
- Current season, competition or edition: 2026 NCAA Division I men's ice hockey tournament
- Sport: Ice hockey
- Founded: 1948
- No. of teams: 16
- Country: United States
- Most recent champion: Denver (11th title)
- Most titles: Denver (11)
- Broadcaster: ESPN
- Website: NCAA.com

The annual NCAA Division I Men's Ice Hockey Tournament is a college ice hockey tournament that is held in the United States by the National Collegiate Athletic Association (NCAA) to determine the top men's team in Division I. Like other Division I championships, it is also the highest level of NCAA men's hockey competition. This tournament is also somewhat unique among NCAA sports as many schools which compete in Division II or Division III in other sports will compete in Division I for hockey.

Since 1999, the national semifinals and championship game part of the tournament have been branded as the "Frozen Four", that is a reference to the NCAA's long-time branding of its basketball semi-finals as the "Final Four".

== History ==
The NCAA Men's Division I Ice Hockey Championship is a single elimination competition that has determined the collegiate national champion since the inaugural 1948 NCAA Men's Division I Ice Hockey Tournament. The tournament features 16 teams representing all six Division I conferences in the nation. The Championship Committee seeds the entire field from 1 to 16 within four regionals of 4 teams. The winners of the six Division I conference championships receive automatic bids to participate in the NCAA Championship. The tournament begins with initial games played at four regional sites culminating with the semi-finals and finals played at a single site.

In setting up the tournament, the Championship Committee seeks to ensure "competitive equity, financial success and likelihood of playoff-type atmosphere at each regional site." A team serving as the host of a regional is placed within that regional. The top four teams are assigned overall seeds and placed within the bracket such that the national semifinals will feature the No. 1 seed versus the No. 4 seed and the No. 2 seed versus the No. 3 seed should the top four teams win their respective regional finals. Number 1 seeds are also placed as close to their home site as possible, with the No. 1 seed receiving first preference. Conference matchups are avoided in the first round; should five or more teams from one conference make the tournament, this guideline may be disregarded in favor of preserving the bracket's integrity.

Broadmoor Ice Palace in Colorado Springs, Colorado, hosted the tournament for the first ten years and has hosted eleven times overall, the most of any venue. The Denver Pioneers have won the most tournaments with eleven, while Vic Heyliger has coached the most championship teams, winning six times with Michigan between 1948 and 1956.

The 2020 championship was cancelled due to the COVID-19 pandemic.

=== Tournament format history ===
1948–1976
4 teams (one game series)

1977–1980
5–6 teams (one game series)

1981–1987
8 teams (two games, total goals first round at higher seed)

1988
12 teams (two games, total goals first two rounds at higher seed)

1989–1991
12 teams (best of three games first two rounds series at higher seed)

1992–2002
12 teams (divided into two regionals, East Regional and West Regional; six teams each)

2003–present
16 teams (divided into four regionals; four teams each)

=== At-large bids ===
Up until 1976, the NCAA tournament invited two teams from each of the two major regions: East and West. Initially, all teams were invited based upon their regular season performance with the NCAA selection committee occasionally deferring to an in-season or unofficial tournament to make their selection easier. Over time, as each of the two regions became dominated by single conferences, the selection committee would just choose the top two teams from each of the two leagues or, when held, the champion(s) and runners-up of the conference tournaments. During the first three decades of the national tournament other conferences did exist, however, most of these were either unofficial or contained teams that were largely regarded as inferior (MIAC for example) and were ignored by the selection committee. Things began to change in the 70s when several new programs joined the top level of play. With the new clubs being unable to join the existing programs, a new conference, the CCHA was formed.

For the first half of the decade, the NCAA tournament continued its recent pattern of only inviting two teams from both ECAC Hockey and the WCHA. However, after several years of petitioning by the new league, the selection committee finally changed the tournament format for the 1976 series. While it could continue to invite two teams from the more established leagues, the committee gave itself the ability to invite up to 4 additional teams to the tournament as it saw fit. Under this policy, the CCHA tournament champion was given a de facto automatic bid but the committee was reticent to include any additional teams in the field. Over a 4-year span, only once did the committee invite any other team, doing so in 1978 when the #1 ranked team in the nation, Boston University, lost in their conference semifinals and would not have been included in the tournament otherwise.

After failing to use most of the additional slots made available by the rule chance, the NCAA tournament was expanded into three full rounds in 1981. At the time, with just one large conference comprising all eastern teams, the ECAC subdivided itself into three regions. The conference's tournament champion as well as the two division champions from the other groups would receive automatic bids. For the west, the WCHA would continue to name two tournament co-champions who would each receive an automatic bid while the single CCHA champion would also receive an automatic bid. One at-large bid for each of the two regions was then available for the best remaining teams.

Within two years this cumbersome policy was abandoned and the NCAA tournament would only offer a single automatic bids to each of the three conferences with the rest of the field being made up of at-large bids. This policy had remained in effect since 1983 and has survived the addition of several other conferences thanks in part to the tournament expanding from eight to twelve to sixteen programs as of 2025.

Beginning in 1981, when at-large bids were first officially introduced, the selection of teams that were offered bids was based upon their national rankings in polls. These were primarily done by some combination of head coaches and sports writers and tended to favor more established programs. In the early 1990s, the selection committee began to try and compare teams objectively by instituting a new ranking system. Some of the initial rankings that resulted were decried as some of the tournament invitees possessed arguably subpar records and their inclusion pushed out teams that were widely regarded as superior, such as Brown in 1993. The system was constantly adjusted and modified and occasionally ignored until it became sole selection criteria around 2008.

Since then, at-large bids were offered to teams based upon their PairWise ranking which provided a single number for each program based upon several categories. The categories were altered and changed over time with each receiving different weights or priorities, however, by 2014 the system was largely seen by the committee as sufficient and went unchanged for several years afterwards. In 2024, the NCAA committee announced that it was abandoning the PairWise rankings for the Division III tournament in favor of the NCAA Power Index (NPI), the same system used for college basketball. A year later, the committee changed the selection process for the Division I tournament, fully adopting the NPI for all levels.

== Results ==
Year	Winning team	Coach	Losing team	Coach	Score	Location	Finals venue
1948	Michigan	Vic Heyliger	Dartmouth	Eddie Jeremiah	8–4	Colorado Springs, Colorado	Broadmoor Ice Palace
1949	Boston College	John Kelley	Dartmouth (2)	Eddie Jeremiah	4–3	Colorado Springs, Colorado	Broadmoor Ice Palace
1950	Colorado College	Cheddy Thompson	Boston University	Harry Cleverly	13–4	Colorado Springs, Colorado	Broadmoor Ice Palace
1951	Michigan (2)	Vic Heyliger	Brown	Westcott Moulton	7–1	Colorado Springs, Colorado	Broadmoor Ice Palace
1952	Michigan (3)	Vic Heyliger	Colorado College	Cheddy Thompson	4–1	Colorado Springs, Colorado	Broadmoor Ice Palace
1953	Michigan (4)	Vic Heyliger	Minnesota	John Mariucci	7–3	Colorado Springs, Colorado	Broadmoor Ice Palace
1954	Rensselaer	Ned Harkness	Minnesota (2)	John Mariucci	5–4 (OT)	Colorado Springs, Colorado	Broadmoor Ice Palace
1955	Michigan (5)	Vic Heyliger	Colorado College (2)	Cheddy Thompson	5–3	Colorado Springs, Colorado	Broadmoor Ice Palace
1956	Michigan (6)	Vic Heyliger	Michigan Tech	Al Renfrew	7–5	Colorado Springs, Colorado	Broadmoor Ice Palace
1957	Colorado College (2)	Tom Bedecki	Michigan	Vic Heyliger	13–6	Colorado Springs, Colorado	Broadmoor Ice Palace
1958	Denver	Murray Armstrong	North Dakota	Bob May	6–2	Minneapolis, Minnesota	Williams Arena
1959	North Dakota	Bob May	Michigan State	Amo Bessone	4–3 (OT)	Troy, New York	RPI Field House
1960	Denver (2)	Murray Armstrong	Michigan Tech (2)	John MacInnes	5–3	Boston, Massachusetts	Matthews Arena
1961	Denver (3)	Murray Armstrong	St. Lawrence	George Menard	12–2	Denver, Colorado	University of Denver Arena
1962	Michigan Tech	John MacInnes	Clarkson	Len Ceglarski	7–1	Utica, New York	Utica Memorial Auditorium
1963	North Dakota (2)	Barry Thorndycraft	Denver	Murray Armstrong	6–5	Chestnut Hill, Massachusetts	McHugh Forum
1964	Michigan (7)	Al Renfrew	Denver (2)	Murray Armstrong	6–3	Denver, Colorado	University of Denver Arena
1965	Michigan Tech (2)	John MacInnes	Boston College	John Kelley	8–2	Providence, Rhode Island	Meehan Auditorium
1966	Michigan State	Amo Bessone	Clarkson (2)	Len Ceglarski	6–1	Minneapolis, Minnesota	Williams Arena
1967	Cornell	Ned Harkness	Boston University (2)	Jack Kelley	4–1	Syracuse, New York	Onondaga War Memorial
1968	Denver (4)	Murray Armstrong	North Dakota (2)	Bill Selman	4–0	Duluth, Minnesota	Duluth Entertainment Center
1969	Denver (5)	Murray Armstrong	Cornell	Ned Harkness	4–3	Colorado Springs, Colorado	Broadmoor World Arena
1970	Cornell (2)	Ned Harkness	Clarkson (3)	Len Ceglarski	6–4	Lake Placid, New York	Olympic Center
1971	Boston University	Jack Kelley	Minnesota (3)	Glen Sonmor	4–2	Syracuse, New York	Onondaga War Memorial
1972	Boston University (2)	Jack Kelley	Cornell (2)	Dick Bertrand	4–0	Boston, Massachusetts	Boston Garden
1973	Wisconsin	Bob Johnson	Denver (3)^{1}	Murray Armstrong	4–2	Boston, Massachusetts	Boston Garden
1974	Minnesota	Herb Brooks	Michigan Tech (3)	John MacInnes	4–2	Boston, Massachusetts	Boston Garden
1975	Michigan Tech (3)	John MacInnes	Minnesota (4)	Herb Brooks	6–1	St. Louis, Missouri	St. Louis Arena
1976	Minnesota (2)	Herb Brooks	Michigan Tech (4)	John MacInnes	6–4	Denver, Colorado	University of Denver Arena
1977	Wisconsin (2)	Bob Johnson	Michigan (2)	Dan Farrell	6–5 (OT)	Detroit, Michigan	Olympia Stadium
1978	Boston University (3)	Jack Parker	Boston College (2)	Len Ceglarski	5–3	Providence, Rhode Island	Providence Civic Center
1979	Minnesota (3)	Herb Brooks	North Dakota (3)	Gino Gasparini	4–3	Detroit, Michigan	Olympia Stadium
1980	North Dakota (3)	Gino Gasparini	Northern Michigan	Rick Comley	5–2	Providence, Rhode Island	Providence Civic Center
1981	Wisconsin (3)	Bob Johnson	Minnesota (5)	Brad Buetow	6–3	Duluth, Minnesota	Duluth Entertainment Center
1982	North Dakota (4)	Gino Gasparini	Wisconsin	Bob Johnson	5–2	Providence, Rhode Island	Providence Civic Center
1983	Wisconsin (4)	Jeff Sauer	Harvard	Bill Cleary	6–2	Grand Forks, North Dakota	Ralph Engelstad Arena
1984	Bowling Green	Jerry York	Minnesota-Duluth	Mike Sertich	5–4 (4OT)	Lake Placid, New York	Olympic Arena
1985	Rensselaer (2)	Mike Addesa	Providence	Steve Stirling	2–1	Detroit, Michigan	Joe Louis Arena
1986	Michigan State (2)	Ron Mason	Harvard (2)	Bill Cleary	6–5	Providence, Rhode Island	Providence Civic Center
1987	North Dakota (5)	Gino Gasparini	Michigan State (2)	Ron Mason	5–3	Detroit, Michigan	Joe Louis Arena
1988	Lake Superior State	Frank Anzalone	St. Lawrence (2)	Joe Marsh	4–3 (OT)	Lake Placid, New York	Olympic Center
1989	Harvard	Bill Cleary	Minnesota (6)	Doug Woog	4–3 (OT)	Saint Paul, Minnesota	Saint Paul Civic Center
1990	Wisconsin (5)	Jeff Sauer	Colgate	Terry Slater	7–3	Detroit, Michigan	Joe Louis Arena
1991	Northern Michigan	Rick Comley	Boston University (3)	Jack Parker	8–7 (3OT)	Saint Paul, Minnesota	Saint Paul Civic Center
1992	Lake Superior State (2)	Jeff Jackson	Wisconsin (2)^{1}	Jeff Sauer	5–3	Albany, New York	Knickerbocker Arena
1993	Maine	Shawn Walsh	Lake Superior State	Jeff Jackson	5–4	Milwaukee, Wisconsin	Bradley Center
1994	Lake Superior State (3)	Jeff Jackson	Boston University (4)	Jack Parker	9–1	Saint Paul, Minnesota	Saint Paul Civic Center
1995	Boston University (4)	Jack Parker	Maine	Shawn Walsh	6–2	Providence, Rhode Island	Providence Civic Center
1996	Michigan (8)	Red Berenson	Colorado College (3)	Don Lucia	3–2 (OT)	Cincinnati, Ohio	Riverfront Coliseum
1997	North Dakota (6)	Dean Blais	Boston University (5)	Jack Parker	6–4	Milwaukee, Wisconsin	Bradley Center
1998	Michigan (9)	Red Berenson	Boston College (3)	Jerry York	3–2 (OT)	Boston, Massachusetts	FleetCenter
1999	Maine (2)	Shawn Walsh	New Hampshire	Dick Umile	3–2 (OT)	Anaheim, California	Arrowhead Pond of Anaheim
2000	North Dakota (7)	Dean Blais	Boston College (4)	Jerry York	4–2	Providence, Rhode Island	Providence Civic Center
2001	Boston College (2)	Jerry York	North Dakota (4)	Dean Blais	3–2 (OT)	Albany, New York	Pepsi Arena
2002	Minnesota (4)	Don Lucia	Maine (2)	Tim Whitehead	4–3 (OT)	Saint Paul, Minnesota	Xcel Energy Center
2003	Minnesota (5)	Don Lucia	New Hampshire (2)	Dick Umile	5–1	Buffalo, New York	HSBC Arena
2004	Denver (6)	George Gwozdecky	Maine (3)	Tim Whitehead	1–0	Boston, Massachusetts	FleetCenter
2005	Denver (7)	George Gwozdecky	North Dakota (5)	Dave Hakstol	4–1	Columbus, Ohio	Value City Arena
2006	Wisconsin (6)	Mike Eaves	Boston College (5)	Jerry York	2–1	Milwaukee, Wisconsin	Bradley Center
2007	Michigan State (3)	Rick Comley	Boston College (6)	Jerry York	3–1	St. Louis, Missouri	Scottrade Center
2008	Boston College (3)	Jerry York	Notre Dame	Jeff Jackson	4–1	Denver, Colorado	Pepsi Center
2009	Boston University (5)	Jack Parker	Miami	Enrico Blasi	4–3 (OT)	Washington, D.C.	Verizon Center
2010	Boston College (4)	Jerry York	Wisconsin (3)	Mike Eaves	5–0	Detroit, Michigan	Ford Field
2011	Minnesota-Duluth	Scott Sandelin	Michigan (3)	Red Berenson	3–2 (OT)	Saint Paul, Minnesota	Xcel Energy Center
2012	Boston College (5)	Jerry York	Ferris State	Bob Daniels	4–1	Tampa, Florida	Tampa Bay Times Forum
2013	Yale	Keith Allain	Quinnipiac	Rand Pecknold	4–0	Pittsburgh, Pennsylvania	Consol Energy Center
2014	Union	Rick Bennett	Minnesota (7)	Don Lucia	7–4	Philadelphia, Pennsylvania	Wells Fargo Center
2015	Providence	Nate Leaman	Boston University (6)	David Quinn	4–3	Boston, Massachusetts	TD Garden
2016	North Dakota (8)	Brad Berry	Quinnipiac (2)	Rand Pecknold	5–1	Tampa, Florida	Amalie Arena
2017	Denver (8)	Jim Montgomery	Minnesota-Duluth (2)	Scott Sandelin	3–2	Chicago, Illinois	United Center
2018	Minnesota-Duluth (2)	Scott Sandelin	Notre Dame (2)	Jeff Jackson	2–1	Saint Paul, Minnesota	Xcel Energy Center
2019	Minnesota-Duluth (3)	Scott Sandelin	UMass	Greg Carvel	3–0	Buffalo, New York	KeyBank Center
2020	Cancelled due to the COVID-19 pandemic					Detroit, Michigan	Little Caesars Arena
2021	UMass	Greg Carvel	St. Cloud State	Brett Larson	5–0	Pittsburgh, Pennsylvania	PPG Paints Arena
2022	Denver (9)	David Carle	Minnesota State	Mike Hastings	5–1	Boston, Massachusetts	TD Garden
2023	Quinnipiac	Rand Pecknold	Minnesota (8)	Bob Motzko	3–2 (OT)	Tampa, Florida	Amalie Arena
2024	Denver (10)	David Carle	Boston College (7)	Greg Brown	2–0	Saint Paul, Minnesota	Xcel Energy Center
2025	Western Michigan	Pat Ferschweiler	Boston University (7)	Jay Pandolfo	6–2	St. Louis, Missouri	Enterprise Center
2026	Denver (11)	David Carle	Wisconsin	Mike Hastings	2–1	Paradise, Nevada	T-Mobile Arena
2027						Washington, D.C.	Capital One Arena
2028						Chicago, Illinois	United Center

^1 Participation in the tournament vacated by the NCAA Committee on Infractions.

== Team titles ==
Schools with D1 men's ice hockey championships
- 11 championships, - 9 championships, - 8 championships, - 6 championships, - 5 championships, - 3 championships, - 2 championships, - 1 championship
Schools with D1 men's ice hockey championships
- 5 championships, - 1 championship

Team	#	Years
Denver	11	1958, 1960, 1961, 1968, 1969, 2004, 2005, 2017, 2022, 2024, 2026
Michigan	9	1948, 1951, 1952, 1953, 1955, 1956, 1964, 1996, 1998
North Dakota	8	1959, 1963, 1980, 1982, 1987, 1997, 2000, 2016
Wisconsin	6	1973, 1977, 1981, 1983, 1990, 2006
Boston College	5	1949, 2001, 2008, 2010, 2012
Boston University	5	1971, 1972, 1978, 1995, 2009
Minnesota	5	1974, 1976, 1979, 2002, 2003
Lake Superior State	3	1988, 1992, 1994
Michigan State	3	1966, 1986, 2007
Michigan Tech	3	1962, 1965, 1975
Minnesota Duluth	3	2011, 2018, 2019
Colorado College	2	1950, 1957
Cornell	2	1967, 1970
Maine	2	1993, 1999
RPI	2	1954, 1985
Bowling Green	1	1984
Harvard	1	1989
UMass	1	2021
Northern Michigan	1	1991
Providence	1	2015
Quinnipiac	1	2023
Union	1	2014
Western Michigan	1	2025
Yale	1	2013

== Performance by team ==
The code in each cell represents the furthest the team made it in the respective tournament:

- • First round (12 teams starting in 1988, 16 teams starting in 2003)
- QF Quarterfinals (1 or 2 teams starting in 1977, 4 teams starting in 1980)
- F4 Frozen Four
- CG Championship Game
- NC National Champion
- ~~CG~~ ~~•~~ The team achieved the placement shown, but the participation was later vacated. These vacated appearances are not included in the total columns.

Starting in 2003, the four teams seeded No. 1 in the regions are shown with single underline.

School	Conference (as of 2026–27)	#	QF	F4	CG	NC	48	49	50	51	52	53	54	55	56	57	58	59	60	61	62	63	64	65	66	67	68	69	70	71	72	73	74	75	76	77	78	79	80	81	82	83	84	85	86	87	88	89	90	91	92	93	94	95	96	97	98	99	00	01	02	03	04	05	06	07	08	09	10	11	12	13	14	15	16	17	18	19	21	22	23	24	25	26
Denver	NCHC	34	26	20	13	11											NC		NC	NC		CG	CG		F4		NC	NC		F4	F4	~~CG~~													F4									QF		QF		•			QF		NC	NC			•	•	•	QF	•	•	•	QF	F4	NC	QF	F4		NC	•	NC	F4	NC
Michigan	Big Ten	42	37	29	12	9	NC	F4	F4	NC	NC	NC	F4	NC	NC	CG					F4		CH													CG														QF	F4	F4	QF	F4	NC	F4	NC	QF	QF	F4	F4	F4	QF	QF	•	•	F4	•	QF	CG	•				QF		F4		•	F4	F4	F4		F4
North Dakota	NCHC	36	29	23	13	8											CG	NC				NC		F4		F4	CG											CG	NC		NC		F4			NC			•							NC	QF	QF	NC	CG		•	QF	CG	F4	F4	F4	•	•	F4	QF	QF	F4	F4	NC	•			QF	•		•		F4
Wisconsin	Big Ten	28	21	12	9	6																							F4		F4	NC				NC	F4			NC	CG	NC					QF	QF	NC	•	~~CG~~	QF	QF	QF			•		QF	QF			QF	•	NC		QF		CG			•	•						•			•		CG
Minnesota	Big Ten	42	35	23	13	5						CG	CG							F4										CG			NC	CG	NC			NC	QF	CG		F4		QF	F4	F4	F4	CG	QF	QF	QF	QF	F4	F4	QF	QF				•	NC	NC	QF	F4	•	QF	•				F4	•	CG	•		•			QF	F4	CG	QF	•	
Boston College	Hockey East	38	34	26	12	5	F4	NC	F4				F4		F4			F4				F4		CG			F4					F4					CG						QF	F4	QF	QF		QF	F4	•							CG	F4	CG	NC		QF	F4	QF	CG	CG	NC		NC	•	NC	•	F4	•	F4				QF			CG	QF	
Boston University	Hockey East	40	34	25	12	5			CG	F4		F4							F4						F4	CG				NC	NC		F4	F4	F4	F4	NC						QF		QF				F4	CG	•	F4	CG	NC	F4	CG	QF		QF		QF	QF		•	QF	•		NC			•			CG	•	QF	QF		•		F4	F4	CG	
Michigan Tech	CCHA	16	10	10	7	3									CG				CG		NC			NC				F4	F4				CG	NC	CG					F4																																		•		•	•			•	•	•		
Michigan State	Big Ten	30	21	11	5	3												CG							NC	F4															QF	QF	F4	QF	NC	CG	QF	F4	QF		F4		•	•	•	•	QF	F4	•	F4	•		•		QF	NC	QF				•											QF	•	QF
Minnesota Duluth	NCHC	16	16	8	5	3																																				QF	CG	F4								QF											F4					QF		NC	QF			QF	QF	CG	NC	NC	F4	QF				QF
Lake Superior State	CCHA	11	10	4	4	3																																						QF			NC	QF	QF	QF	NC	CG	NC	QF	QF																								•					
Maine	Hockey East	20	15	11	5	2																																								QF	F4	F4	QF	F4	QF	NC		CG				NC	F4	QF	CG	•	CG	•	F4	F4					•											•	•	
Colorado College	NCHC	20	18	10	5	2	F4	F4	NC	F4	CG			CG		NC																					QF																	QF	CG	F4	QF	QF		QF	QF	QF		F4	•		•			QF														
Cornell	ECAC	26	20	8	4	2																				NC	F4	CG	NC		CG	F4							F4	QF					QF					•					•	QF					QF	F4		QF	QF			QF	•		QF					•	•	QF			QF	QF	QF	•
RPI	ECAC	9	6	5	2	2						F4	NC							F4			F4																				QF	NC									•	•																•														
Harvard	ECAC	27	15	13	3	1								F4		F4	F4											F4		F4			F4	F4							QF	CG		QF	CG	F4	•	NC				•	F4								•	•	•	•	•									•	•	F4		•		•	•			
Quinnipiac	ECAC	12	7	3	3	1																																																							•											CG	•	•	CG			QF	•	QF	NC	QF	•	QF
Providence	Hockey East	17	10	5	2	1																	F4														QF			QF		F4		CG				QF		•					•					•													QF	NC	•	•	QF	F4					•	•
Northern Michigan	CCHA	8	5	3	2	1																																	CG	F4								•		NC	QF	QF						•											•															
UMass	Hockey East	6	4	2	2	1																																																												QF												CG	NC	•		•	QF	
Bowling Green	CCHA	10	7	2	1	1																														QF	F4	QF			QF		NC			QF	QF	•	•																													•						
Yale	ECAC	8	4	2	1	1					F4																																														•											•	QF	QF		NC		•	•									
Union	ECAC	5	3	2	1	1																																																																•	F4	QF	NC			•								
Western Michigan	NCHC	11	4	1	1	1																																							QF								•		•															•	•					•				QF	•	•	NC	QF
Clarkson	ECAC	22	14	7	3	-										F4	F4				CG	F4			CG				CG											QF	QF		QF						•	F4	•	•		•	QF	QF	•	QF								•	QF										•	•						
St. Lawrence	ECAC	16	12	9	2	-					F4			F4	F4			F4	F4	CG	F4																					QF				QF	CG	•			QF							•	F4	•						•																		
New Hampshire	Hockey East	22	14	7	2	-																														F4		F4			F4	QF									•		QF	•		•	F4	CG	•		F4	CG	•	QF	•	•	•	QF	QF	QF		QF												
Notre Dame	Big Ten	13	7	4	2	-																																																									•			QF	CG	•		F4		•	•		•	F4	CG	QF	•	QF				
Dartmouth	ECAC	5	4	4	2	-	CG	CG																														F4	F4																																													•
Brown	ECAC	4	3	3	1	-				CG														F4											F4																	•																																
St. Cloud State	NCHC	17	7	2	1	-																																										•											•	QF	•	•				•	•		QF			F4	QF	QF	•		•	•	CG	•	QF			
Miami	NCHC	12	5	2	1	-																																														•				•							•		•	QF	QF	CG	F4	•	•	QF		•										
Minnesota State	CCHA	11	2	2	1	-																																																								•										•	•	•			•	•	F4	CG	•		•	•
Ferris State	CCHA	4	4	1	1	-																																																								QF									CG		QF		QF									
Colgate	ECAC	6	2	1	1	-																																		QF									CG										•					•									•								•			
Ohio State	Big Ten	11	3	2	-	-																																																			F4	•				•	•	•				•								•	F4	•			QF		•	
Vermont	Hockey East	6	2	2	-	-																																									•								F4	•												F4	•				•											
UMass Lowell	Hockey East	9	7	1	-	-																																									•						QF		QF																QF	F4	QF		QF	QF				•				
Penn State	Big Ten	5	3	1	-	-																																																																						QF	•				QF		F4	•
Bemidji State	CCHA	5	2	1	-	-																																																										•	•			F4	•										QF					
RIT	AHA	4	2	1	-	-																																																															F4					QF	•							•		
Northeastern	Hockey East	8	1	1	-	-																																			F4						•						•															•							•		•	•		•				
Omaha	NCHC	5	1	1	-	-																																																											•					•				F4					•			•		
Air Force	AHA	7	3	-	-	-																																																												•	•	QF		•	•					QF	QF							
Merrimack	Hockey East	4	1	-	-	-																																									QF																							•											•			•
Niagara	AHA	4	1	-	-	-																																																					QF				•				•					•												
Alaska Anchorage	Independent	3	1	-	-	-																																											•	QF	•																																	
American International	NE-10	3	1	-	-	-																																																																								QF	•	•				
Holy Cross	AHA	2	1	-	-	-																																																									•		QF																			
UConn	Hockey East	1	1	-	-	-																																																																													QF	•
Princeton	ECAC	4	-	-	-	-																																																			•										•	•									•							
Mercyhurst	defunct	3	-	-	-	-																																																						•		•		•																				
Alabama-Huntsville	on hiatus	2	-	-	-	-																																																												•			•															
Canisius	AHA	2	-	-	-	-																																																																		•									•			
Bentley	AHA	2	-	-	-	-																																																																													•	•
Wayne State	defunct	1	-	-	-	-																																																								•																						
Robert Morris	AHA	1	-	-	-	-																																																																			•											
Arizona State	NCHC	1	-	-	-	-																																																																								•						
Alaska	Independent	-	-	-	-	-																																																															~~•~~															

== Records ==
=== Points in a championship game ===
Player	School	Year	Goals	Assists	Points
Wally Gacek	Michigan	1948	3	3	6
Chris Ray	Colorado College	1950	4	2	6
Bob McCusker	Colorado College	1957	4	2	6
Wally Grant	Michigan	1948	2	3	5
Harry Whitworth	Colorado College	1950	2	3	5
Bill Masterton	Denver	1961	3	2	5
Tom Vannelli	Minnesota	1976	1	4	5
Phil Sykes	North Dakota	1980	1	4	5
Ted Greer	Michigan	1948	1	3	4
Tony Frasca	Colorado College	1950	2	2	4
Ron Hartwell	Colorado College	1950	2	2	4
Neil McDonald	Michigan	1956	2	2	4
Dick Wilson	Michigan Tech	1956	2	2	4
Bill Hay	Colorado College	1957	2	2	4
Murray Massier	Denver	1958	1	3	4
Jerry Walker	Denver	1961	1	3	4
Grant Munro	Denver	1961	2	2	4
Trent Beatty	Denver	1961	2	2	4
John Ivanitz	Michigan Tech	1962	3	1	4
Jerry Sullivan	Michigan Tech	1962	2	2	4
Gary Milroy	Michigan Tech	1965	2	2	4
Pat Phippen	Minnesota	1976	1	3	4
Doug Smail	North Dakota	1980	4	0	4
John Newberry	Wisconsin	1981	2	2	4
Phil Sykes	North Dakota	1982	3	1	4
Scott Beattie	Northern Michigan	1991	3	1	4
Gerald Tallaire	Lake Superior State	1994	0	4	4
Rob Valicevic	Lake Superior State	1994	2	2	4
Nathan Gerbe	Boston College	2008	2	2	4
Brock Boeser	North Dakota	2016	1	3	4

=== Points in multiple championships ===
Player	School	Games	Goals	Assists	Points
Phil Sykes	North Dakota	2	4	5	9
Neil McDonald	Michigan	2	4	3	7
Pat Phippen	Minnesota	3	2	5	7
Wally Gacek	Michigan	1	3	3	6
Chris Ray	Colorado College	1	4	2	6
Bob McCusker	Colorado College	1	4	2	6
Bill Masterton	Denver	2	3	3	6
Jerry Walker	Denver	2	2	4	6

=== Championship hat tricks ===
Player	School	Year	Goals	Game-winner	MOP
Wally Gacek	Michigan	1948	3		
Chris Ray	Colorado College	1950	4		
Ed Switzer	Michigan	1956	3	✓	
Bob McCusker	Colorado College	1957	4	✓	✓
Bill Masterton	Denver	1961	3		✓
John Ivanitz	Michigan Tech	1962	3	✓	
Bob Hamill*	Denver	1963	3		
Dan Lodboa	Cornell	1970	3^{†}	✓	✓
Doug Smail	North Dakota	1980	4^{†}	✓	✓
Phil Sykes	North Dakota	1982	3	✓	✓
Allen Bourbeau*	Harvard	1986	3		
John Byce	Wisconsin	1990	3		
Scott Beattie	Northern Michigan	1991	3		✓
Darryl Plandowski	Northern Michigan	1991	3	✓	
Jason Zent* ^{‡}	Wisconsin	1992	3		
Jim Montgomery	Maine	1993	3^{†}	✓	✓
Jarid Lukosevicius	Denver	2017	3	✓	✓

* Was not a member of the winning team.
† Natural hat-trick.
‡ Tournament participation later vacated.

=== Tournament winning percentage ===
Minimum 2 tournaments

Player	School	Years	Wins	Losses	Ties	Winning percentage
Hunter Shepard	Minnesota-Duluth	2018, 2019	8	0	0	1.000
Darren Jensen	North Dakota	1980, 1982	5	0	0	1.000
Lorne Howes	Michigan	1955, 1956	4	0	0	1.000
George Kirkwood	Denver	1960, 1961	4	0	0	1.000
Gerry Powers	Denver	1968, 1969	4	0	0	1.000
Marc Behrend	Wisconsin	1981, 1982, 1983	7	0	1	.938
John Muse	Boston College	2008, 2010, 2011	8	1	0	.889
Filip Lindberg	Massachusetts	2019, 2021	6	1	0	.857
Blaine Lacher	Lake Superior State	1992, 1993, 1994	6	1	0	.857
Matt Davis	Denver	2024, 2025	6	1	0	.857
Kenny Reiter	Minnesota-Duluth	2011, 2012	5	1	0	.833
Jon Gillies	Providence	2014, 2015	5	1	0	.833
Marty Turco	Michigan	1995, 1996, 1997, 1998	9	2	0	.818
Willard Ikola	Michigan	1952, 1953, 1954	4	1	0	.800
Bob Essensa	Michigan State	1984, 1985, 1986, 1987	4	1	0	.800
Parker Milner	Boston College	2012, 2013	4	1	0	.800
Cam Johnson	North Dakota	2016, 2017	4	1	0	.800
Scott Clemmensen	Boston College	1998, 1999, 2000, 2001	10	3	0	.769
Jeff Lerg	Michigan State	2006, 2007, 2008	6	2	0	.750
Jack McDonald	Michigan	1948, 1949	3	1	0	.750
Bob Fox	Rensselaer	1953, 1954	3	1	0	.750
Gaye Cooley	Michigan State	1966, 1967	3	1	0	.750
Jim Craig	Boston University	1977, 1978	3	1	0	.750
Tanner Jaillet	Denver	2015, 2016, 2017, 2018	8	3	0	.727
Duane Derksen	Wisconsin	1990, 1991, 1992	7	3	0	.700
Cory Schneider	Boston College	2005, 2006, 2007	7	3	0	.700

== Tournament droughts ==
The following is a list of teams that have not made an NCAA tournament any time in the last 10 seasons.

School	Appearances	Last appearance
Alaska	0 ^{†}	Never^{†}
Alaska Anchorage	3	1992
Army	0	Never
Brown	4	1993
Colorado College	20	2011
Holy Cross	2	2006
Miami	12	2015
New Hampshire	22	2013
Niagara	4	2013
Northern Michigan	8	2010
Rensselaer	9	2011
Robert Morris	1	2014
Sacred Heart	0	Never
St. Lawrence	16	2007 ^{‡}
Vermont	6	2014

† Alaska's only appearance in 2010 was later vacated due to NCAA rules violations.
‡ St. Lawrence received an automatic bid in 2021, however, the team had to decline the invitation due to a positive COVID-19 test from their head coach.

== Awards ==
At the conclusion of each tournament both an all-tournament team and 'Most Outstanding Player in Tournament' is named. Both achievements have been in effect since the inaugural championship in 1948.

== See also ==
- NCAA Division II men's ice hockey tournament
- NCAA Division III men's ice hockey tournament
- NCAA women's ice hockey tournament (National Collegiate division; de facto equivalent to Division I)
