= Chris Ray (ice hockey) =

American ice hockey player (1924–1999)

- Born: April 18, 1924 Belmont, Massachusetts, USA
- Died: April 13, 1999 (aged 74)
- Position: Forward
- Played for: Colorado College
- Playing career: 1947–1951

Christopher P. Ray was an American ice hockey forward who played for Colorado College after World War II and helped the program win its first National Championship in 1950.

== Career ==
After helping the US National Team to a 5th-place finish at the 1947 Ice Hockey World Championships, Ray was one of a slew of talented players who joined Colorado College after the second World War. He helped pushing the team to a 19-7 record in his freshman season and earning the Tigers a bid into the first NCAA Tournament. CC fell to Dartmouth in the semifinal but the team returned to the tournament the following year, only to lost both games by a rather large margin. Ray had one more chance to win a national championship in his junior season (the NCAA restricted athletes to three years of varsity eligibility at the time), and the team responded with one of the most overpowering offensive seasons in NCAA history. While the team again finished 2nd in the west behind Michigan, CC scored 167 goals in just 22 games, an average of more than 7.5 goals per game. Ray netted 26 of those markers himself and, in the semifinal against Boston College, Ray's 3-point night helped put the Eagles away.

The Tigers made their first Championship appearance against Boston University and the two teams remained close after 40 minutes. In the third period, however, Colorado College exploded for 10 goals (an NCAA record as of 2020) with Ray having a hand in half (three goals and two assists). CC won the game 13-4 setting a record for the most goals scored by one team in the championship game (tied with CC in 1957), the most goals scored by both teams in the championship game (surpassed by 19 from CC and Michigan in 1957), the largest margin of victory (surpassed by +10 from Denver in 1961), the most goals scored (23) and the widest margin of victory (+16) in a Frozen Four (still NCAA records). Ray's four goals in the Championship set a new NCAA record that has been tied twice but never surpassed as of 2020. His two assists also left him with 6 points which tied the NCAA record that still stands as of 2020. Ray holds the distinction of scoring the most goals in the final game of any player to not be named Most Outstanding Player. The 31 goals he scored on the year earned Ray a place on the AHCA All-American Second Team while his tournament exploits went entirely unrecognized. Ray played one more year at CC before graduating and finished his college career as the Tigers' all-time scoring leader with 173 points in 99 games. Ray held the program record for 23 years until he was surpassed by Doug Palazzari during the 1973–74 season.

== Statistics ==
=== Regular season and playoffs ===
			Regular season					Playoffs
Season	Team	League	GP	G	A	Pts	PIM	GP	G	A	Pts	PIM
1947–48	Colorado College	NCAA	27	—	—	—	—	—	—	—	—	—
1948–49	Colorado College	NCAA	23	—	—	—	—	—	—	—	—	—
1949–50	Colorado College	NCAA	24	31	13	44	19	—	—	—	—	—
1950–51	Colorado College	NCAA	25	18	29	47	—	—	—	—	—	—
NCAA totals			99	96	77	173	—	—	—	—	—	—

== Awards and honors ==
Award	Year
AHCA Second Team All-American	1949–50
