= Tony Frasca =

American ice hockey player and coach (1927–1999)

Biographical details
- Born: May 30, 1927; Cambridge, Massachusetts, U.S.
- Died: April 1, 1999 (aged 71); Colorado Springs, Colorado, U.S.

Playing career
- 1949–1952: Colorado College

Coaching career (HC unless noted)
- 1958–1963: Colorado College

Head coaching record
- Overall: 30–85–4

Accomplishments and honors

Championships
- 1950 NCAA National Championship

Awards
- 1963 Spencer Penrose Award; 2000 Colorado Springs Sports Hall of Fame

Records
- Lowest winning percentage one season: (.000)

Anthony J. Frasca (May 30, 1927 – April 1, 1999) was an American ice hockey player and coach for the varsity programs at Colorado College. He helped CC win its first national title in 1950.

== Career ==
=== Player ===
Tony Frasca began attending Colorado College in the fall of 1948, joining a team that had made the first NCAA tournament the year before. Frasca began playing with the Tigers after sitting out his freshman year (as was common) and for the third consecutive year Colorado College made the tournament. In the first game Frasca and Tigers knocked off defending champion Boston College 10–3, moving onto their first national title game. Against Boston University the Tigers got down early before rebounding in the second period to take a 3–1 lead into the third. Once in the final frame CC produced the greatest offensive period the championship match has ever seen, scoring 10 times (2 by Frasca) to demolish the Terriers 13–4 and claim the school's first national title. One of his two goals in the third came 8 seconds after BU had scored, setting a team record for the fastest response goal that still stands. (as of 2014)

The next year the tigers returned to the tournament but couldn't overcome Brown in the semifinals. The following year the Tigers became a founding member of the MCHL (a predecessor to the WCHA) and in Frasca's senior season won the inaugural conference title. The Tigers were invited to their fifth straight NCAA tournament and defeated Yale 4–3 to make the 1952 title game, but couldn't top defending champion Michigan. Frasca was an inaugural member of the All-MCHL First Team and finished his playing career as the third leading scorer in CC history (#5 in career goals, #1 in career assists) and third in points-per-game (as of 2014 Frasca is still 5th all-time in PPG).

=== Coaching ===
In 1958 Frasca returned to his alma mater as an assistant professor and the head coach of the Tigers who were a year removed from their second national title. Taking over after the sudden resignation of Tom Bedecki as well as the dissolution of the WIHL, the Tigers struggled to a 6-14-3 record in his first season, their worst in 13 years. CC's situation got a little better the following season when the WCHA was officially founded with the Tigers as a charter member but the record did not improve much. The next two seasons saw a sharp decline in the team's performance, hitting rock bottom in 1961–62 when the Tigers posted an all-time NCAA worst 0–23 record. Colorado College rebounded sharply the next season, posting a winning season at 12–11 and earning Frasca the 1963 Spencer Penrose Award, but after the season Frasca stepped down from his position in favor of Bob Johnson. Frasca remained at Colorado College, serving as the head coach for the baseball team for 24 years as well as director of intramural sports and manager of the ice rink before retiring as an emeritus associate professor in 1990.

=== Death ===
Tony Frasca died on April 1, 1999, from stomach cancer at the age of 71.

== Awards and honors ==
| Award | Year |
|---|---|
| AHCA First Team All-American | 1950–51 |
| All-NCAA All-Tournament First Team | 1950 |
| All-MCHL First Team | 1951–52 |
| AHCA First Team All-American | 1951–52 |

Frasca was awarded the 1963 Spencer Penrose Award by the American Hockey Coaches Association for being voted as the best coach that season. He was inducted into the Colorado Springs Sports Hall of fame in 2000 as part of the 1950 national title team and in 2001 Colorado College began awarding a team award to the top playoff performer in his honor.

== Career statistics ==
| | | | Regular season | | | | | Playoffs |
| Season | Team | League | GP | G | A | Pts | PIM | GP | G | A | Pts | PIM |
|---|---|---|---|---|---|---|---|---|---|---|---|---|
| 1949–50 | Colorado College | NCAA | 24 | 34 | — | — | — | — | — | — | — | — |
| 1950–51 | Colorado College | NCAA | 25 | — | — | — | — | — | — | — | — | — |
| 1951–52 | Colorado College | MCHL | 25 | — | — | — | — | — | — | — | — | — |
| NCAA totals | | | 74 | 76 | 87 | 163 | — | — | — | — | — | — |

== Head coaching record ==
Record table
| Season | Team | Overall | Conference | Standing | Postseason |
|---|---|---|---|---|---|
Colorado College Tigers Independent (1958–1959)
| 1958-59 | Colorado College | 6-14-3 | | | |
| Colorado College: | | 6-14-3 | | | |
Colorado College Tigers (WCHA) (1959–1963)
| 1959-60 | Colorado College | 8-17-1 | 8-12-0 | 4th | WCHA Finals (Loss) |
| 1960-61 | Colorado College | 4-20-0 | 4-18-0 | 7th | |
| 1961-62 | Colorado College | 0-23-0 | 0-18-0 | 7th | |
| 1962-63 | Colorado College | 12-11-0 | 6-10-0 | 5th | |
| Colorado College: | | 24-71-1 | 18-58-0 | | |
| Total: | | 30-85-4 | | | |
National champion Postseason invitational champion Conference regular season champion Conference regular season and conference tournament champion Division regular season champion Division regular season and conference tournament champion Conference tournament champion

Awards and achievements
| Preceded by Jack Kelley | Spencer Penrose Award; 1962–63 | Succeeded by Tom Eccleston |
