= Westcott Moulton =

American ice hockey player and coach (1906–1983)

Biographical details
- Born: June 1, 1906; Boston, Massachusetts, United States
- Died: November 23, 1983 (aged 77)

Playing career
- 1928–1931: Brown
- Position: Center

Coaching career (HC unless noted)
- 1947–1952: Brown

Head coaching record
- Overall: 54-38-1 (.586)

Accomplishments and honors

Awards
- 1971 Brown Athletic Hall of Fame

Westcott E. S. Moulton (1906–1983) was an American ice hockey player and coach who was the driving force behind Brown's hockey program revival after World War II. An exciting player in his youth, the class of '31 graduate returned to his alma mater after serving in the Navy, working in various capacities until 1962 which included being the head coach of the ice hockey team after convincing then-President Henry Wriston to restart the program. Moulton was an inaugural member of Brown's Athletic Hall of Fame in 1971.

== Head coaching record ==
Record table
Season	Team	Overall	Conference	Standing	Postseason
Brown Bears Independent (1947–1952)
1947–48	Brown	5-9-0			
1948–49	Brown	7-7-0			
1949–50	Brown	11-9-0			
1950–51	Brown	18-6-0			NCAA Runner-Up
1951–52	Brown	13-7-1			
Brown:		54-38-1			
Total:		54-38-1			
National champion Postseason invitational champion Conference regular season champion Conference regular season and conference tournament champion Division regular season champion Division regular season and conference tournament champion Conference tournament champion
