= Cheddy Thompson =

Canadian ice hockey coach

- Cheddy Thompson holding the 1950 National Championship Trophy

Biographical details
- Born: July 4, 1915; Saskatchewan, Canada
- Died: August 26, 1972 (aged 57); Colorado Springs, Colorado, U.S.
- Education: Gonzaga University

Playing career
- 1939–1941: Gonzaga
- Position: Forward

Coaching career (HC unless noted)
- 1945–1955: Colorado College

Head coaching record
- Overall: 149–72–5 (.670)
- Tournaments: 6–5 (.545)

Accomplishments and honors

Championships
- 1950 NCAA National Championship; 1952 MCHL Regular Season Championship; 1955 WIHL Regular Season Championship

Awards
- 1952 Spencer Penrose Award; 1998 Colorado College Athletic Hall of Fame (Team); 2000 Colorado Springs Sports Hall of Fame; 2013 Colorado College Athletic Hall of Fame (Individual)

Records
- Most goals scored in NCAA tournament: 1 period (10); Most goals scored in NCAA tournament: 1 game (13-tied)

Cyril L. "Cheddy" Thompson (July 4, 1915 – August 26, 1972) was a Canadian ice hockey coach. He was the head coach of Colorado College after World War II during their most successful era and led the team to their first national title in 1950.

== Career ==
Cheddy Thompson attended Gonzaga University during the period when the Bulldogs supported an ice hockey program, playing for the team from 1939 to 1941. After graduating Thompson joined the military during the Second World War and was assigned to 2nd Air Force HQ in Colorado Springs. With the war winding down Colorado College was among a number of schools who restarted (or began) Division I programs with theirs rekindling in the 1944–45 season. With the war over by the start of the next season, and Colorado College in need of a full-time coach, Thompson was chosen to head the program.

Thompson's first season finished disappointingly with a 3–8 mark, but he soon got the Tigers on track with a then-school record 14 wins the next season. The following year (1947–48) the NCAA began holding a tournament to determine the ice hockey National Champion. With a 19–7 record, Thompson's Tigers were one of four teams invited to participate, facing off against Dartmouth and losing the semifinal 8–4. With a 14–6–1 mark the next season Colorado College returned to the national tournament (along with all three others from the previous year) and were defeated twice, first by Boston College in the semifinal (7–3) and then by Michigan in the first consolation game (10–4).

The 1949–50 season saw more of the same during the regular season with the Tigers finishing 16–5–1 and heading to their third consecutive tournament (along with Michigan and BC) but were finally able to win their first playoff game by avenging last year's loss to Boston College, winning 10–3 in the semifinal. In the final against Boston University the Terriers jumped out to an early lead, ending the first period ahead 1–0 but once the second frame began the Tigers took over the game, scoring 3 goals in the middle period and scoring a still-NCAA record 10 goals in the third to win 13–4. Despite the 23 goals scored in two games, Ralph Bevins of Boston University was chosen as the Tournament Most Outstanding Player.

Thompson got the Tigers back to the tournament in each of the next two seasons, going 1–3 in the championship, with 1951–52 seeing a major change as the Tigers became a founding member of the MCHL (a predecessor to the WCHA) and won the conference title the first season. Thompson received the Spencer Penrose Award the same year from the American Collegiate Hockey Association. The Tigers missed the tournament for two consecutive years before returning in 1955. While the Tigers dropped the title tilt to rival Michigan, a bigger loss came after the season when Thompson resigned as head coach.

== Honors ==
While a fan favorite in Colorado Springs, Thompson wouldn't receive many accolades for his work until after his death in 1972, being inducted into the Colorado Springs Sports Hall of Fame in 2000 and the Colorado College Athletic Hall of Fame twice: first as a member of the 1950 championship team in 1998 and then for his coaching career in 2013.

== Head coaching record ==
Record table
Season	Team	Overall	Conference	Standing	Postseason
Colorado College Tigers Independent (1945–1951)
1945–46	Colorado College	3–8–0			
1946–47	Colorado College	14–5–0			
1947–48	Colorado College	19–8–0			NCAA Semifinal
1948–49	Colorado College	15–7–1			NCAA Consolation Game (Loss)
1949–50	Colorado College	18–5–1			NCAA National Champion
1950–51	Colorado College	16–8–1			NCAA Consolation Game (Loss)
Colorado College:		85–41–3			
Colorado College Tigers (MCHL) (1951–1953)
1951–52	Colorado College	19–5–1	10–2–0	1st	NCAA Runner-Up
1952–53	Colorado College	9–11–0	4–10–0	5th	
Colorado College:		28–16–1	14–12–0		
Colorado College Tigers (WIHL) (1953–1955)
1953–54	Colorado College	14–9–1	6–8–0	t-4th	
1954–55	Colorado College	22–6–0	14–4–0	1st	NCAA Runner-Up
Colorado College:		36–15–1	20–12–0		
Total:		149–72–5			
National champion Postseason invitational champion Conference regular season champion Conference regular season and conference tournament champion Division regular season champion Division regular season and conference tournament champion Conference tournament champion

Awards and achievements
Preceded by Edward Jeremiah	Spencer Penrose Award; 1951–52	Succeeded by John Mariucci
