= Jack Garrity =

American ice hockey player

- Born: April 1, 1926 Woburn, Massachusetts, U.S.
- Died: August 31, 2015 (aged 89) Brookline, Massachusetts, U.S.
- Position: Right wing
- Shot: Right
- Played for: Worcester Warriors; Boston Olympics
- National team: United States
- Playing career: 1951–1955

John Paul Garrity (April 1, 1926 – August 31, 2015) was an American ice hockey player. Garrity was a member of the American 1948 Winter Olympics team. He was inducted into the United States Hockey Hall of Fame in 1986.

== Career ==
Jack Garrity was one of Massachusetts' most outstanding hockey players in high school, college, the Olympics and at the senior hockey level. Jack skated on greater Boston rinks for over 60 years and in addition to his playing, coached high school hockey for 10 years, refereed high school and NCAA college games for 20 years and taught at hockey camps until he was 70. He also designed and published one of America's first hockey scorebooks, which was widely used by local schools during the 1950s and 1960s.

With his older brother Bill, Jack started his hockey career in Medford playing on the ponds with Jack, Bill and Joe Riley. He then starred at Medford High School, where he led the Mustangs to two GBI Hockey League and Massachusetts High School Hockey State Championship titles in the Boston Garden in 1943 and 1944. At Medford, Jack was the captain, high scorer, All League, and All Scholastic.

After graduating from high school, Jack joined the Army Air Corps and then returned to the rink after WW II ended. He first played for the Needham Rockets and then was selected as one of just three non-college players, along with Jack Kirrane, to play for the 1948 Olympic Team, which narrowly missed the bronze medal in Saint Moritz, Switzerland.

Following the Olympics, he entered Boston University in 1949, where he proceeded to smash the BU hockey and NCAA record books, while graduating from the four-year program in only 3 years. As freshmen were not permitted to play on the varsity at that time, Jack only played two seasons of varsity hockey at BU. However, during his sophomore year Jack broke the NCAA single season scoring record with 51 goals and 33 assists for 84 points, as he led BU to the NCAA final before bowing to Colorado College. The next year, he co-captained BU and recorded 57 points on the way to another NCAA Final Four, but the team lost out in the semi-finals to Michigan. In each of his two years on the BU varsity he earned 1st Team All American honors, as well as 1st Team NCAA Hockey Tournament awards.

Almost 60 years later, Jack still holds four BU hockey records: single season goals (51); single season points (84); single game goals (7); and single game points (9). Jack's 51-goal season still ranks eighth in NCAA history, and his 85-career goals rank sixth on the all-time BU hockey list, even though he played one-to-two years less than all other record holders. Chris Drury, BU's career leading goal scorer recorded 113 goals over four seasons. With these hockey records, it is no wonder why Jack's image is so prominently displayed on the walls of Agganis Arena at Boston University.

Upon graduation, Jack became a teacher and the athletic director at the newly established Archbishop Williams High School in Braintree, where he taught for the next 11 years. At the same time, Jack continued playing hockey for the Boston Olympics in the Eastern Hockey League and the Worcester Warriors, while coaching hockey at Medford High School, where one of his best players was Bill Monbouquette, who later became a stand-out pitcher for the Red Sox.

Jack went on to coach almost every sport at Archbishop Williams, except basketball, and founded the hockey team in 1954. In those early years, only a few guys actually knew how to stand up on skates, but practices on Whitman's Pond in Weymouth and early morning practices at the Boston Arena slowly began to pay off, and many of his players went on to become outstanding college hockey players. One of the players he started, Jack Leetch, later became an All American at BC, and his son, Brian, captained the 1988 US Olympic Team and later the New York Rangers.

Over the next 12 years, while he was coaching and refereeing high school and college games, Jack continued to play stand-out senior amateur hockey for the Brockton Wetzels and the Rockland Estes, both of which won National Senior AHAUS titles in 1959 and 1960, with Jack being the leading scorer. In 1960, in preparation for the Squaw Valley Olympics, Jack was playing on a line with Bill and Bob Cleary, but unfortunately had to drop off the team for financial reasons, when he could not get a 3-month (teaching and coaching) leave of absence from Archbishop Williams. Nevertheless, Jack cheered his friends and teammates on to their great Gold Medal victory from in front of his black and white television in Weymouth.

Ironically, at Archbishop Williams Jack became better known as a successful football coach, leading the school to a number of undefeated seasons and championships. He then continued coaching at Quincy High School. As a result of his football coaching success, Jack was inducted into the Massachusetts Football Coaches Association Hall of Fame in 1998.

But hockey was always Jack's passion, and he was inducted into the BU Hall of Fame in 1959 and the US Hockey Hall of Fame in 1986. Even as he became older and gave up coaching and refereeing, he still taught hundreds of greater Boston hockey players, including future Olympics Dave Silk and Jackie O'Callahan, at numerous hockey schools. And even as he got older, he still kept playing hockey for local teams such as the Moby Dicks, which won the 65-years-and-older Snoopy Tournament in Santa Rosa, California. Jack played hockey until he was 78 years old and when asked why he stopped, he said, "It is time to hang up your skates when guys start catching you from behind."

However, despite all of his success on the ice, it was only in 2009, at 83 years of age that Jack finally saw his BU finally win an NCAA Championship in Washington, DC, when Jackie Parker invited him up from Florida to attend the tournament and address the Terrier team at their pre-tournament team dinner. BU thrilled him with an unforgettable 4-to-3 overtime win over Miami University (Ohio), by scoring 2 goals in the last 53 seconds.

Although hockey consumed Jack's life, with strong support of his number one hockey fan from Medford High School and late wife of more than 60 years, Jean, they were able to raise six children: five sons who played hockey in the Boston area, and a daughter who was the chief cheerleader in those days before Title IX. In 1972, Jack and Jean took all of the kids out of school and during his one-year sabbatical from school, drove a Volkswagen van more than 20,000 miles from Europe across the Sahara Desert through the heart of Africa to South Africa and then back up the east coast and through the Middle East. Later, over a period of 10 years he continued to travel extensively throughout Asia, in India, Thailand, Indonesia, Philippines, Cambodia, Vietnam, Japan and Korea, while visiting family and friends.

He died in Brookline, Massachusetts on August 31, 2015, after a long illness at the age of 89.

== Awards and honors ==
Award	Year
AHCA First Team All-American	1949–50
NCAA All-Tournament First Team	1950
AHCA First Team All-American	1950–51
NCAA All-Tournament Second Team	1951

Awards and achievements
Preceded by Bill Riley	NCAA Ice Hockey Scoring Champion; 1949–50	Succeeded by Neil Celley
