= Jack McDonald (ice hockey goaltender) =

American ice hockey goaltender

- Born: International Falls, Minnesota, U.S.
- Position: Goaltender
- Played for: Michigan
- Playing career: 1946–1950

John A. "Black Jack" McDonald is an American retired ice hockey goaltender who played in the 1948 NCAA men's ice hockey tournament.

== Career ==
McDonald served as in the United States Naval Air Corps for four years during World War II. After the war, he resumed his studies and began attending the University of Michigan, where he joined the ice hockey team for the second half of the 1945–46 season. He established himself as the starting goaltender the following year and was instrumental in the success of the Michigan program immediately after the war.

In 1947, the NCAA formed a national tournament for the upcoming ice hockey season. Michigan was expected to vie for one of the two western spots but, with McDonald between the pipes, Michigan produced an 18–2–1 record and received the top western seed. In their opening round match Michigan and Boston College battled to a 4–4 tie in regulation which forced a 20-minute overtime. The rules at the time stated that the entire overtime session had to be played. This allowed Michigan to score twice in the extra session and win the game. This was the only non-sudden-death overtime in NCAA tournament history. The following game Michigan faced eastern powerhouse Dartmouth and found themselves down by two goals mid-way through the game. McDonald bore down and stopped all succeeding shots, allowing his team to climb back and go on a six-goal run to win the first NCAA ice hockey tournament.

McDonald won all of Michigan's 20 games that season, becoming the first goaltender to achieve that mark in one season. He equaled that total the following year, though Michigan fell in the National Semifinal. Because he had played in the second half of the 1945–46 season, he was only able to play during the first semester of the 1949–50 season. McDonald won 10 of 12 games and provided Michigan a foundation upon which they built the first college hockey dynasty.

McDonald graduated with a degree in mechanical engineering and at the time he was the winningest goaltender in the history of college hockey. His 50 wins would stand as a career mark for only six seasons, however, no one could take from him the honor of winning the first championship. He was inducted in the Dekers Hall of Fame in 1986.

== Awards and honors ==
Award	Year
AHCA Second Team All-American	1949–50
