= Ralph Bevins =

American ice hockey player (1924–2017)

- Born: October 7, 1924 New Hampshire, US
- Died: May 8, 2017 (aged 92) Largo, Florida, US
- Position: Goaltender
- Played for: Boston University
- Playing career: 1946–1950

Ralph E. "Ike" Bevins (1924–2017) was an American ice hockey goaltender who captained Boston University to their appearance in the 1950 national championship game.

== Career ==
After graduating from Arlington High School, Bevins joined the Navy during World War II. After the war he began attending Boston University and joined both the baseball and hockey teams. In his senior season Bevins was named captain of the hockey team just in time for the program to return to varsity status. Bevins led the team to the 1950 NCAA Tournament and played a masterful game in net in the semifinal. BU defeated tournament favorite Michigan 4–3 with Bevins making 36 saves in the game. The team could not keep the same pace in the championship tilt, losing to Colorado College 4–13. Despite surrendering 13 goals, Bevins' performance in both games earned him the Tournament MOP.

After graduating Bevins worked as an assistant football coach for Arlington High School until 1975 when he became the head coach. During this time he was also an instructor at a local ice hockey school. He retired from the Arlington school system and moved to St. Petersburg, Florida in 1987, the year that his wife Priscilla died.

== Honors ==
Bevins was inducted into the Boston University Athletic Hall of Fame in 1965.

== Awards and honors ==
Award	Year
AHCA First Team All-American	1949–50
NCAA All-Tournament First Team	1950
NCAA Tournament MVP	1950

Awards and achievements
Preceded by Dick Desmond	NCAA Tournament Most Outstanding Player; 1950	Succeeded by Donald Whiston
