= List of NCAA Division I men's ice hockey champions =

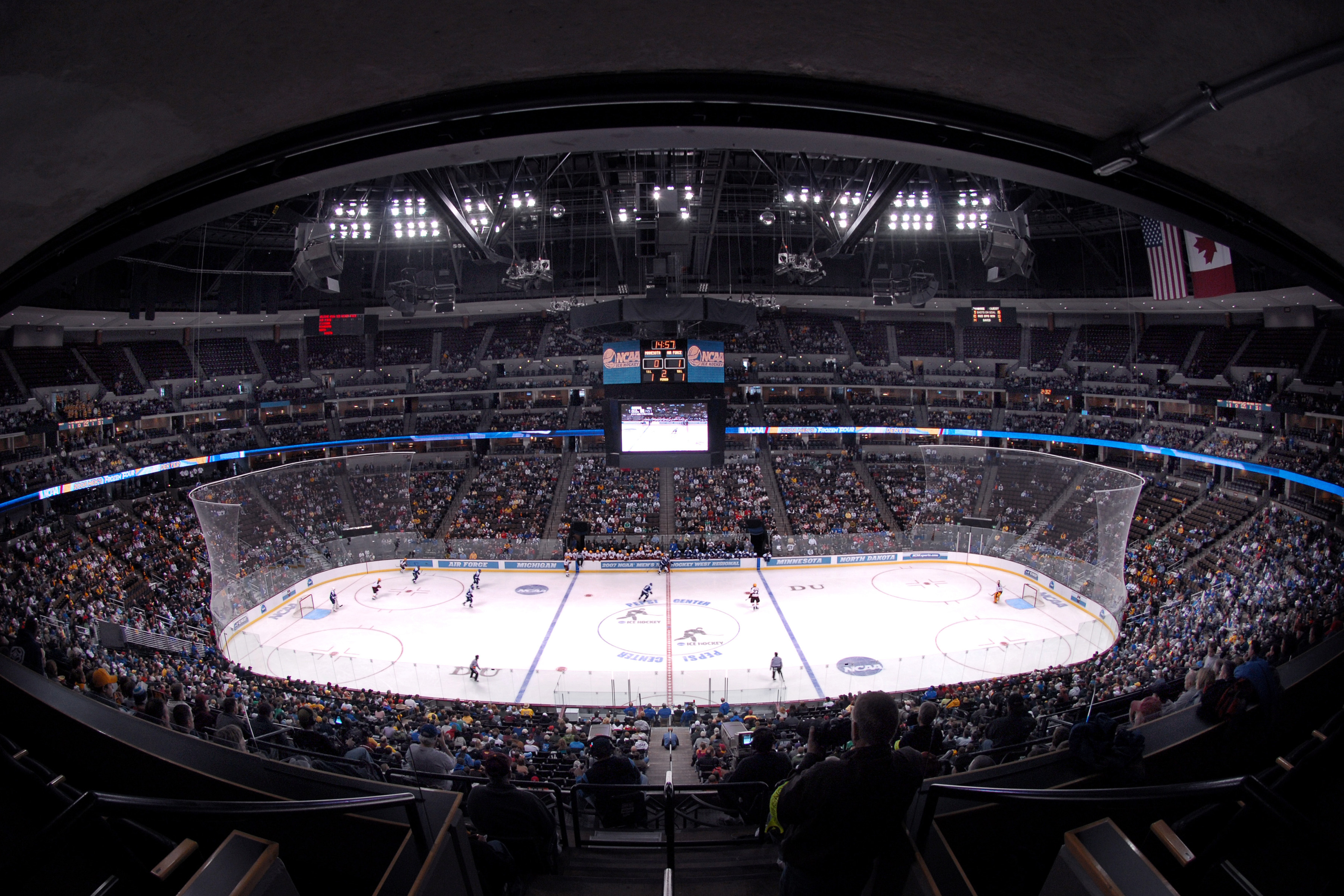
The Pepsi Center, now known as Ball Arena, hosted the 2008 NCAA Division I men's ice hockey tournament.

The NCAA Division I men's ice hockey tournament is a college ice hockey tournament held in the United States by the National Collegiate Athletic Association (NCAA). Like other Division I championships, it is the highest level of NCAA men's hockey competition.

The first Broadmoor World Arena in Colorado Springs, Colorado, known from 1938 to 1960 as Broadmoor Ice Palace (and not to be confused with the current World Arena), hosted the tournament for the first ten years and has hosted eleven times overall, the most of any venue. Denver has won the most tournaments with 11, while Vic Heyliger has coached the most championship teams, winning six times with Michigan between 1948 and 1956. Jerry York has made the most appearances in the title game with nine, going 5–4 in the process.

== Champions ==
Year	Winning team	Coach	Losing team	Coach	Score	Location	Finals venue
1948	Michigan	Vic Heyliger	Dartmouth	Eddie Jeremiah	8–4	Colorado Springs, Colorado	Broadmoor Ice Palace
1949	Boston College	John Kelley	Dartmouth	Eddie Jeremiah	4–3	Colorado Springs, Colorado	Broadmoor Ice Palace
1950	Colorado College	Cheddy Thompson	Boston University	Harry Cleverly	13–4	Colorado Springs, Colorado	Broadmoor Ice Palace
1951	Michigan (2)	Vic Heyliger	Brown	Westcott Moulton	7–1	Colorado Springs, Colorado	Broadmoor Ice Palace
1952	Michigan (3)	Vic Heyliger	Colorado College	Cheddy Thompson	4–1	Colorado Springs, Colorado	Broadmoor Ice Palace
1953	Michigan (4)	Vic Heyliger	Minnesota	John Mariucci	7–3	Colorado Springs, Colorado	Broadmoor Ice Palace
1954	Rensselaer	Ned Harkness	Minnesota	John Mariucci	5–4 (OT)	Colorado Springs, Colorado	Broadmoor Ice Palace
1955	Michigan (5)	Vic Heyliger	Colorado College	Cheddy Thompson	5–3	Colorado Springs, Colorado	Broadmoor Ice Palace
1956	Michigan (6)	Vic Heyliger	Michigan Tech	Al Renfrew	7–5	Colorado Springs, Colorado	Broadmoor Ice Palace
1957	Colorado College (2)	Tom Bedecki	Michigan	Vic Heyliger	13–6	Colorado Springs, Colorado	Broadmoor Ice Palace
1958	Denver	Murray Armstrong	North Dakota	Bob May	6–2	Minneapolis, Minnesota	Williams Arena
1959	North Dakota	Bob May	Michigan State	Amo Bessone	4–3 (OT)	Troy, New York	RPI Field House
1960	Denver (2)	Murray Armstrong	Michigan Tech	John MacInnes	5–3	Boston, Massachusetts	Boston Arena
1961	Denver (3)	Murray Armstrong	St. Lawrence	George Menard	12–2	Denver, Colorado	University of Denver Arena
1962	Michigan Tech	John MacInnes	Clarkson	Len Ceglarski	7–1	Utica, New York	Utica Memorial Auditorium
1963	North Dakota (2)	Barry Thorndycraft	Denver	Murray Armstrong	6–5	Chestnut Hill, Massachusetts	McHugh Forum
1964	Michigan (7)	Al Renfrew	Denver	Murray Armstrong	6–3	Denver, Colorado	University of Denver Arena
1965	Michigan Tech (2)	John MacInnes	Boston College	John Kelley	8–2	Providence, Rhode Island	Meehan Auditorium
1966	Michigan State	Amo Bessone	Clarkson	Len Ceglarski	6–1	Minneapolis, Minnesota	Williams Arena
1967	Cornell	Ned Harkness	Boston University	Jack Kelley	4–1	Syracuse, New York	Onondaga County War Memorial Auditorium
1968	Denver (4)	Murray Armstrong	North Dakota	Bill Selman	4–0	Duluth, Minnesota	Duluth Arena Auditorium
1969	Denver (5)	Murray Armstrong	Cornell	Ned Harkness	4–3	Colorado Springs, Colorado	Broadmoor World Arena
1970	Cornell (2)	Ned Harkness	Clarkson	Len Ceglarski	6–4	Lake Placid, New York	Olympic Center
1971	Boston University	Jack Kelley	Minnesota	Glen Sonmor	4–2	Syracuse, New York	Onondaga County War Memorial Auditorium
1972	Boston University (2)	Jack Kelley	Cornell	Dick Bertrand	4–0	Boston, Massachusetts	Boston Garden
1973	Wisconsin	Bob Johnson	Denver (vacated)	Murray Armstrong	4–2	Boston, Massachusetts	Boston Garden
1974	Minnesota	Herb Brooks	Michigan Tech	John MacInnes	4–2	Boston, Massachusetts	Boston Garden
1975	Michigan Tech (3)	John MacInnes	Minnesota	Herb Brooks	6–1	St. Louis, Missouri	St. Louis Arena
1976	Minnesota (2)	Herb Brooks	Michigan Tech	John MacInnes	6–4	Denver, Colorado	University of Denver Arena
1977	Wisconsin (2)	Bob Johnson	Michigan	Dan Farrell	6–5 (OT)	Detroit, Michigan	Olympia Stadium
1978	Boston University (3)	Jack Parker	Boston College	Len Ceglarski	5–3	Providence, Rhode Island	Providence Civic Center
1979	Minnesota (3)	Herb Brooks	North Dakota	Gino Gasparini	4–3	Detroit, Michigan	Olympia Stadium
1980	North Dakota (3)	Gino Gasparini	Northern Michigan	Rick Comley	5–2	Providence, Rhode Island	Providence Civic Center
1981	Wisconsin (3)	Bob Johnson	Minnesota	Brad Buetow	6–3	Duluth, Minnesota	Duluth Arena Auditorium
1982	North Dakota (4)	Gino Gasparini	Wisconsin	Bob Johnson	5–2	Providence, Rhode Island	Providence Civic Center
1983	Wisconsin (4)	Jeff Sauer	Harvard	Bill Cleary	6–2	Grand Forks, North Dakota	Winter Sports Center
1984	Bowling Green	Jerry York	Minnesota–Duluth	Mike Sertich	5–4 (4OT)	Lake Placid, New York	1980 Olympic Arena
1985	Rensselaer (2)	Mike Addesa	Providence	Steve Stirling	2–1	Detroit, Michigan	Joe Louis Arena
1986	Michigan State (2)	Ron Mason	Harvard	Bill Cleary	6–5	Providence, Rhode Island	Providence Civic Center
1987	North Dakota (5)	Gino Gasparini	Michigan State	Ron Mason	5–3	Detroit, Michigan	Joe Louis Arena
1988	Lake Superior State	Frank Anzalone	St. Lawrence	Joe Marsh	4–3 (OT)	Lake Placid, New York	1980 Olympic Arena
1989	Harvard	Bill Cleary	Minnesota	Doug Woog	4–3 (OT)	Saint Paul, Minnesota	Saint Paul Civic Center
1990	Wisconsin (5)	Jeff Sauer	Colgate	Terry Slater	7–3	Detroit, Michigan	Joe Louis Arena
1991	Northern Michigan	Rick Comley	Boston University	Jack Parker	8–7 (3OT)	Saint Paul, Minnesota	Saint Paul Civic Center
1992	Lake Superior State (2)	Jeff Jackson	Wisconsin (vacated)	Jeff Sauer	5–3	Albany, New York	Knickerbocker Arena
1993	Maine	Shawn Walsh	Lake Superior State	Jeff Jackson	5–4	Milwaukee, Wisconsin	Bradley Center
1994	Lake Superior State (3)	Jeff Jackson	Boston University	Jack Parker	9–1	Saint Paul, Minnesota	Saint Paul Civic Center
1995	Boston University (4)	Jack Parker	Maine	Shawn Walsh	6–2	Providence, Rhode Island	Providence Civic Center
1996	Michigan (8)	Red Berenson	Colorado College	Don Lucia	3–2 (OT)	Cincinnati, Ohio	Riverfront Coliseum
1997	North Dakota (6)	Dean Blais	Boston University	Jack Parker	6–4	Milwaukee, Wisconsin	Bradley Center
1998	Michigan (9)	Red Berenson	Boston College	Jerry York	3–2 (OT)	Boston, Massachusetts	FleetCenter
1999	Maine (2)	Shawn Walsh	New Hampshire	Dick Umile	3–2 (OT)	Anaheim, California	Arrowhead Pond of Anaheim
2000	North Dakota (7)	Dean Blais	Boston College	Jerry York	4–2	Providence, Rhode Island	Providence Civic Center
2001	Boston College (2)	Jerry York	North Dakota	Dean Blais	3–2 (OT)	Albany, New York	Pepsi Arena
2002	Minnesota (4)	Don Lucia	Maine	Tim Whitehead	4–3 (OT)	Saint Paul, Minnesota	Xcel Energy Center
2003	Minnesota (5)	Don Lucia	New Hampshire	Dick Umile	5–1	Buffalo, New York	HSBC Arena
2004	Denver (6)	George Gwozdecky	Maine	Tim Whitehead	1–0	Boston, Massachusetts	FleetCenter
2005	Denver (7)	George Gwozdecky	North Dakota	Dave Hakstol	4–1	Columbus, Ohio	Value City Arena
2006	Wisconsin (6)	Mike Eaves	Boston College	Jerry York	2–1	Milwaukee, Wisconsin	Bradley Center
2007	Michigan State (3)	Rick Comley	Boston College	Jerry York	3–1	St. Louis, Missouri	Scottrade Center
2008	Boston College (3)	Jerry York	Notre Dame	Jeff Jackson	4–1	Denver, Colorado	Pepsi Center
2009	Boston University (5)	Jack Parker	Miami	Enrico Blasi	4–3 (OT)	Washington, D.C.	Verizon Center
2010	Boston College (4)	Jerry York	Wisconsin	Mike Eaves	5–0	Detroit, Michigan	Ford Field
2011	Minnesota–Duluth	Scott Sandelin	Michigan	Red Berenson	3–2 (OT)	Saint Paul, Minnesota	Xcel Energy Center
2012	Boston College (5)	Jerry York	Ferris State	Bob Daniels	4–1	Tampa, Florida	Tampa Bay Times Forum
2013	Yale	Keith Allain	Quinnipiac	Rand Pecknold	4–0	Pittsburgh, Pennsylvania	Consol Energy Center
2014	Union	Rick Bennett	Minnesota	Don Lucia	7–4	Philadelphia, Pennsylvania	Wells Fargo Center
2015	Providence	Nate Leaman	Boston University	David Quinn	4–3	Boston, Massachusetts	TD Garden
2016	North Dakota (8)	Brad Berry	Quinnipiac	Rand Pecknold	5–1	Tampa, Florida	Amalie Arena
2017	Denver (8)	Jim Montgomery	Minnesota–Duluth	Scott Sandelin	3–2	Chicago, Illinois	United Center
2018	Minnesota–Duluth (2)	Scott Sandelin	Notre Dame	Jeff Jackson	2–1	Saint Paul, Minnesota	Xcel Energy Center
2019	Minnesota Duluth (3)	Scott Sandelin	Massachusetts	Greg Carvel	3–0	Buffalo, New York	KeyBank Center
2020	Canceled due to the COVID-19 pandemic					Detroit, Michigan	Little Caesars Arena
2021	Massachusetts	Greg Carvel	St. Cloud State	Brett Larson	5–0	Pittsburgh, Pennsylvania	PPG Paints Arena
2022	Denver (9)	David Carle	Minnesota State	Mike Hastings	5–1	Boston, Massachusetts	TD Garden
2023	Quinnipiac	Rand Pecknold	Minnesota	Bob Motzko	3–2 (OT)	Tampa, Florida	Amalie Arena
2024	Denver (10)	David Carle	Boston College	Greg Brown	2–0	Saint Paul, Minnesota	Xcel Energy Center
2025	Western Michigan	Pat Ferschweiler	Boston University	Jay Pandolfo	6–2	St. Louis, Missouri	Enterprise Center
2026	Denver (11)	David Carle	Wisconsin	Mike Hastings	2–1	Paradise, Nevada (Note: Labeled as Las Vegas in marketing material.)	T-Mobile Arena
2027						Washington, D.C.	Capital One Arena
2028						Chicago, Illinois	United Center

== Team titles ==
Schools with D1 men's ice hockey championships
– 11 championships, – 9 championships, – 8 championships, – 6 championships, – 5 championships, – 3 championships, – 2 championships, – 1 championship
Schools with D1 men's ice hockey championships
– 5 championships, – 1 championship

Team	Number	Years won
Denver	11	1958, 1960, 1961, 1968, 1969, 2004, 2005, 2017, 2022, 2024, 2026
Michigan	9	1948, 1951, 1952, 1953, 1955, 1956, 1964, 1996, 1998
North Dakota	8	1959, 1963, 1980, 1982, 1987, 1997, 2000, 2016
Wisconsin	6	1973, 1977, 1981, 1983, 1990, 2006
Minnesota	5	1974, 1976, 1979, 2002, 2003
Boston University	5	1971, 1972, 1978, 1995, 2009
Boston College	5	1949, 2001, 2008, 2010, 2012
Michigan Tech	3	1962, 1965, 1975
Lake Superior State	3	1988, 1992, 1994
Michigan State	3	1966, 1986, 2007
Minnesota Duluth	3	2011, 2018, 2019
Colorado College	2	1950, 1957
Cornell	2	1967, 1970
Rensselaer	2	1954, 1985
Maine	2	1993, 1999
Bowling Green	1	1984
Harvard	1	1989
Northern Michigan	1	1991
Yale	1	2013
Union	1	2014
Providence	1	2015
Massachusetts	1	2021
Quinnipiac	1	2023
Western Michigan	1	2025

== Frozen Four appearances ==
Team	Number of appearances	Years
Michigan	29	1948, 1949, 1950, 1951, 1952, 1953, 1954, 1955, 1956, 1957, 1962, 1964, 1977, 1992, 1993, 1995, 1996, 1997, 1998, 2001, 2002, 2003, 2008, 2011, 2018, 2022, 2023, 2024, 2026
Boston College	26	1948, 1949, 1950, 1954, 1956, 1959, 1963, 1965, 1968, 1973, 1978, 1985, 1990, 1998, 1999, 2000, 2001, 2004, 2006, 2007, 2008, 2010, 2012, 2014, 2016, 2024
Boston University	25	1950, 1951, 1953, 1960, 1966, 1967, 1971, 1972, 1974, 1975, 1976, 1977, 1978, 1990, 1991, 1993, 1994, 1995, 1996, 1997, 2009, 2015, 2023, 2024, 2025
Minnesota	23	1953, 1954, 1961, 1971, 1974, 1975, 1976, 1979, 1981, 1983, 1986, 1987, 1988, 1989, 1994, 1995, 2002, 2003, 2005, 2012, 2014, 2022, 2023
North Dakota	23	1958, 1959, 1963, 1965, 1967, 1968, 1979, 1980, 1982, 1984, 1987, 1997, 2000, 2001, 2005, 2006, 2007, 2008, 2011, 2014, 2015, 2016, 2026
Denver	20	1958, 1960, 1961, 1963, 1964, 1966, 1968, 1969, 1971, 1972, 1986, 2004, 2005, 2016, 2017, 2019, 2022, 2024, 2025, 2026
Harvard	13	1955, 1957, 1958, 1969, 1971, 1974, 1975, 1983, 1986, 1987, 1989, 1994, 2017
Wisconsin	12	1970, 1972, 1973, 1977, 1978, 1981, 1982, 1983, 1990, 2006, 2010, 2026
Maine	11	1988, 1989, 1991, 1993, 1995, 1999, 2000, 2002, 2004, 2006, 2007
Michigan State	11	1959, 1966, 1967, 1984, 1986, 1987, 1989, 1992, 1999, 2001, 2007
Colorado College	10	1948, 1949, 1950, 1951, 1952, 1955, 1957, 1996, 1997, 2005
Michigan Tech	10	1956, 1960, 1962, 1965, 1969, 1970, 1974, 1975, 1976, 1981
St. Lawrence	9	1952, 1955, 1956, 1959, 1960, 1961, 1962, 1988, 2000
Cornell	8	1967, 1968, 1969, 1970, 1972, 1973, 1980, 2003
Minnesota Duluth	8	1984, 1985, 2004, 2011, 2017, 2018, 2019, 2021
Clarkson	7	1957, 1958, 1962, 1963, 1966, 1970, 1991
New Hampshire	7	1977, 1979, 1982, 1998, 1999, 2002, 2003
Providence	5	1964, 1983, 1985, 2015, 2019
Rensselaer	5	1953, 1954, 1961, 1964, 1985
Dartmouth	4	1948, 1949, 1979, 1980
Lake Superior State	4	1988, 1992, 1993, 1994
Notre Dame	4	2008, 2011, 2017, 2018
Brown	3	1951, 1965, 1976
Northern Michigan	3	1980, 1981, 1991
Quinnipiac	3	2013, 2016, 2023
Bowling Green	2	1978, 1984
Massachusetts	2	2019, 2021
Miami	2	2009, 2010
Minnesota State	2	2021, 2022
Ohio State	2	1998, 2018
St. Cloud State	2	2013, 2021
Union	2	2012, 2014
Vermont	2	1996, 2009
Yale	2	1952, 2013
Bemidji State	1	2009
Colgate	1	1990
Ferris State	1	2012
Massachusetts-Lowell	1	2013
Northeastern	1	1982
Omaha	1	2015
Penn State	1	2025
RIT	1	2010
Western Michigan	1	2025

Note: Denver's participation in the 1973 tournament and Wisconsin's participation in the 1992 tournament were later vacated by the NCAA.

== Host cities ==
City	Number	Years hosted
Colorado Springs, Colorado	11	1948, 1949, 1950, 1951, 1952, 1953, 1954, 1955, 1956, 1957, 1969
Boston, Massachusetts	8	1960, 1972, 1973, 1974, 1998, 2004, 2015, 2022
Detroit, Michigan	7	1977, 1979, 1985, 1987, 1990, 2010, 2020**
Providence, Rhode Island	7	1965, 1978, 1980, 1982, 1986, 1995, 2000
Saint Paul, Minnesota	7	1989, 1991, 1994, 2002, 2011, 2018, 2024
Denver, Colorado	4	1961, 1964, 1976, 2008
Lake Placid, New York	3	1970, 1984, 1988
Milwaukee, Wisconsin	3	1993, 1997, 2006
St. Louis, Missouri	3	1975, 2007, 2025
Tampa, Florida	3	2012, 2016, 2023
Albany, New York	2	1992, 2001
Buffalo, New York	2	2003, 2019
Chicago, Illinois	2	2017, 2028*
Duluth, Minnesota	2	1968, 1981
Minneapolis, Minnesota	2	1958, 1966
Pittsburgh, Pennsylvania	2	2013, 2021
Syracuse, New York	2	1967, 1971
Washington, D.C.	2	2009, 2027*
Anaheim, California	1	1999
Chestnut Hill, Massachusetts	1	1963
Cincinnati, Ohio	1	1996
Columbus, Ohio	1	2005
Grand Forks, North Dakota	1	1983
Las Vegas, Nevada	1	2026
Philadelphia, Pennsylvania	1	2014
Troy, New York	1	1959
Utica, New York	1	1962

(*) denotes future Frozen Fours
(**) Detroit was to host the 2020 tournament, which was canceled due to the COVID-19 pandemic.

== Regional host cities ==
City	Number	Years hosted
Worcester, Massachusetts	18	1993, 1995, 1997, 1999, 2001, 2002, 2003, 2005, 2006, 2008, 2010, 2012, 2014, 2016, 2018, 2020**, 2022, 2026
Albany, New York	13	1994, 1996, 1998, 2000, 2004, 2006, 2008, 2010, 2016, 2020**, 2021, 2022, 2026
Manchester, New Hampshire	10	2004, 2007, 2009, 2011, 2013, 2015, 2017, 2019, 2023, 2025
Bridgeport, Connecticut	8	2009, 2011, 2012, 2014, 2018, 2021, 2023
Fargo, North Dakota	8	2015, 2017, 2019, 2021, 2023, 2025, 2027*, 2028*
Allentown, Pennsylvania	7	2018, 2019, 2020**, 2022, 2023, 2025, 2028*
Grand Rapids, Michigan	7	1997, 2001, 2004, 2005, 2007, 2009, 2013
Providence, Rhode Island	7	1992, 2003, 2013, 2015, 2017, 2019, 2024
Loveland, Colorado	5	2020**, 2021, 2022, 2026, 2027*
Minneapolis, Minnesota	4	2000, 2003, 2005, 2009
Saint Paul, Minnesota	4	2010, 2012, 2014, 2016
Sioux Falls, South Dakota	4	2018, 2024, 2026, 2028*
Ann Arbor, Michigan	3	1998, 2002, 2003
Cincinnati, Ohio	3	2014, 2016, 2017
Green Bay, Wisconsin	3	2006, 2011, 2012
Madison, Wisconsin	3	1995, 1999, 2008
Colorado Springs, Colorado	2	2004, 2008
Detroit, Michigan	2	1992, 1993
East Lansing, Michigan	2	1994, 1996
Rochester, New York	2	2007, 2028*
Springfield, Massachusetts	2	2024, 2027*
Toledo, Ohio	2	2013, 2025
Amherst, Massachusetts	1	2005
Denver, Colorado	1	2007
Fort Wayne, Indiana	1	2010
Grand Forks, North Dakota	1	2006
Hartford, Connecticut	1	2027*
Maryland Heights, Missouri	1	2024
St. Louis, Missouri	1	2011
South Bend, Indiana	1	2015

Note: Regional tournaments were not conducted until 1992

Note: Manchester, New Hampshire was originally selected to host the 2021 Northeast Regional, but withdrew due to the COVID-19 pandemic. The 2021 Northeast Regional was subsequently re-awarded to Albany, New York.

Note: Bridgeport, Connecticut was originally selected to host a 2027 Regional, but the Regional was subsequently re-awarded to Hartford, Connecticut after renovations to Total Mortgage Arena were announced following the relocation of the Bridgeport Islanders to Hamilton, Ontario.

(*) denotes future Frozen Four Regionals
(**) denotes cities that were to host 2020 regional sites, which were canceled due to the COVID-19 pandemic.

== Multiple meetings ==
Teams	Games	Years	Record
Colorado College and Michigan	4	1952, 1955, 1957, 1996	3–1, Michigan
Denver and North Dakota	4	1958, 1963, 1968, 2005	3–1, Denver
Michigan Tech and Minnesota	3	1974, 1975, 1976	2–1, Minnesota
Boston College and North Dakota	2	2000, 2001	1–1
Boston College and Wisconsin	2	2006, 2010	1–1
Boston University and Cornell	2	1967, 1972	1–1
Michigan State and North Dakota	2	1959, 1987	2–0, North Dakota

== See also ==
- List of NCAA Division I men's ice hockey seasons
- NCAA Division I men's ice hockey tournament Most Outstanding Player
