= 1950 NCAA men's ice hockey tournament =

College ice hockey tournament

- Teams: 4
- Finals site: Broadmoor Ice Palace, Colorado Springs, Colorado
- Champions: Colorado College Tigers (1st title)
- Runner-up: Boston University Terriers (1st title game)
- Semifinalists: Boston College Eagles (3rd Frozen Four); Michigan Wolverines (3rd Frozen Four)
- Winning coach: Cheddy Thompson (1st title)
- MOP: Ralph Bevins (Boston University)
- Attendance: 10,000

The 1950 NCAA Men's Ice Hockey Tournament was the culmination of the 1949–50 NCAA men's ice hockey season, the third such tournament in NCAA history. It was held between March 16 and 18, 1950, and concluded with Colorado College defeating Boston University 13–4. All games were played at the Broadmoor Ice Palace in Colorado Springs, Colorado.

The 13 goals Colorado College scored in the championship game is a record that has been equaled only once (by Colorado College in 1957). Additionally, the 23 goals scored in their two games is a record for one team in a Frozen Four. CC's goal differential (+16) is also a record for an NCAA tournament, matched by Michigan in 1953 and Wisconsin in 1983.

== Qualifying teams ==
Four teams qualified for the tournament, two each from the eastern and western regions. The teams were selected by a committee based upon both their overall record and the strength of their opponents.

East							West						
Seed	School	Conference	Record	Berth type	Appearance	Last bid	Seed	School	Conference	Record	Berth type	Appearance	Last bid
1	Boston College	Independent	14–3–0	At-Large	3rd	1949	1	Michigan	Independent	22–3–0	At-Large	3rd	1949
2	Boston University	Independent	18–4–0	At-Large	1st	Never	2	Colorado College	Independent	16–5–1	At-Large	3rd	1949

== Format ==
The eastern and western teams judged as better were seeded as the top regional teams. The second eastern seed was slotted to play the top western seed and vice versa. All games were played at the Broadmoor Ice Palace. All matches were Single-game eliminations with the semifinal winners advancing to the national championship game and the losers playing in a consolation game.

== Bracket ==
Semifinals; March 16–17
E1	Boston College	3
W2	Colorado College	10
W1	Michigan	3
E2	Boston University	4

National championship March 18
W2	Colorado College	13
E2	Boston University	4
Third-place game
E1	Boston College	6
W1	Michigan	10

Note: * denotes overtime period(s)

== Results ==
=== Semifinals ===
==== Boston College vs. Colorado College ====
March 16	Boston College	3 – 10	Colorado College	Broadmoor Ice Palace
(Ceglarski) Jack Mulhern - 03:07 (unassisted) Jack Mulhern - 17:55		First period	14:54 - Ron Hartwell (Ray); 16:29 - Carl Lawrence (Berry, Frasca); 17:18 - Ron Hartwell (Whitworth)
No Scoring		Second period	01:21 - Chris Ray (Hartwell); 16:29 - Carl Lawrence (Berry); 17:18 - Carl Lawrence (Frasca, Berry)
(McCusker) Giles Threadgold - 16:21		Third period	07:09 - Carl Lawrence (Berry); 07:31 - Tony Frasca (Yalich); 13:22 - Bill MacDonald (Ray); 15:37 - Carl Lawrence (Frasca, MacDonald)
Peter Maggio ( 32 saves ) / Edward Casey ( 2 saves )		Goalie stats	( 24 saves ) Roy Ikola

==== Michigan vs. Boston University ====
March 17	Michigan	3 – 4	Boston University	Broadmoor Ice Palace
(Smith) Paul Pelow - 00:49 (Keyes) Wally Grant - PP - 10:57		First period	No scoring
No scoring		Second period	04:27 - Dick Kelley (Robinson); 09:34 - Bill Jurgelevich (Folino, Robinson); 11:18 - Jack Garrity (unassisted); 18:02 - GW - Dick Kelley (Garrity)
(Grant) Joe Marmo - 06:23		Third period	No scoring
John MacInnes (14 saves)		Goalie stats	(36 saves) Ralph Bevins

=== Consolation Game ===
==== Michigan vs. Boston College ====
March 18	Michigan	10 – 6	Boston College	Broadmoor Ice Palace
(Celley) Gil Burford - 02:05 (Celley) Gil Burford - 10:47 (unassisted) Bob Heathcott - 16:47		First period	No scoring
(unassisted) Earl Keyes - 13:03 (Grant, Heathcott) Earl Keyes - 13:57		Second period	01:28 - Warren Lewis (Ceglarksi, Mulhern); 04:14 - Ed Songin (unassisted); 05:34 - Warren Lewis (unknown); 12:02 - Warren Lewis (unknown); 15:03 - Jack Mulhern (Ceglarski, Songin)
(Brumm) Gil Burford - 01:28 (unassisted) Gil Burford - GW - 02:49 (Grant) Earl Keyes - 04:58 (Keyes) Gil Burford - 06:54 (May, Keyes) Bob Heathcott - 08:31		Third period	17:26 - Jack Mulhern (Garrity)
John MacInnes (22 saves)		Goalie stats	(30 saves) Peter Maggio (3 saves) Ed Casey

=== Championship Game ===
==== Colorado College vs. Boston University ====
March 18	Colorado College	13 – 4	Boston University	Broadmoor Ice Palace

Scoring summary
Period	Team	Goal	Assist(s)	Time	Score
1st	BU	Joe Czarnotta	Garrity	6:16	1–0 BU
2nd	CC	Harry Whitworth	Starrak	27:53	1–1
2nd	CC	Carl Lawrence	Frasca and Berry	28:05	2–1 CC
2nd	CC	Chris Ray	Hartwell and Yalich	34:27	3–1 CC
3rd	CC	Ron Hartwell – GW	unassisted	40:52	4–1 CC
3rd	CC	Chris Ray	Whitworth	45:26	5–1 CC
3rd	BU	Jack Kelley	Garrity	46:47	5–2 CC
3rd	CC	Harry Whitworth	Ray and Hartwell	49:49	6–2 CC
3rd	CC	Chris Ray	Whitworth	51:20	7–2 CC
3rd	CC	Ron Hartwell	Whitworth and Ray	51:34	8–2 CC
3rd	CC	Tony Frasca	Berry and MacDonald	53:03	9–2 CC
3rd	CC	Cameron Berry	Frasca and MacDonald	53:18	10–2 CC
3rd	CC	Jim Starrak	unassisted	56:15	11–2 CC
3rd	CC	Chris Ray	unassisted	56:39	12–2 CC
3rd	BU	Jack Garrity	J. Kelley	58:21	12–3 CC
3rd	CC	Tony Frasca	Lawrence	58:29	13–3 CC
3rd	BU	Bob Bell	Robinson and Bradley	59:56	13–4 CC
Penalty summary
Period	Team	Player	Penalty	Time	PIM
1st	BU	William Jurgelevich			2:00
1st	BU	Lloyd Robinson			2:00
1st	BU	Jack Garrity			2:00
1st	CC	Jim Starrak			2:00
1st	CC	Milo Yalich			2:00
1st	CC	Bud Eastwood			2:00
2nd	BU	Jack Kelley			2:00
2nd	BU	Joe Folino			2:00
2nd	BU	Joe Czarnotta			5:00
2nd	CC	Tony Frasca			2:00
3rd	CC	Leonard Maccini			2:00
3rd	CC	William MacDonald			2:00

Shots by period
Team	1	2	3	T
Colorado College	10	15	18	43
Boston University	9	6	11	26

Goaltenders
Team	Name	Saves	Goals against	Time on ice
CC	Roy Ikola	22	4	
BU	Ralph Bevins	30	13	

== All-Tournament team ==
=== First Team ===
- G: Ralph Bevins* (Boston University)
- D: Ross Smith (Michigan)
- D: Jim Starrak (Colorado College)
- F: Bill Anderson (Boston University)
- F: Tony Frasca (Colorado College)
- F: Jack Garrity (Boston University)

* Most Outstanding Player(s)

=== Second Team ===
- G: Roy Ikola (Colorado College)
- D: Ed Songin (Boston College)
- D: Joe Foligno (Boston University)
- F: Jack Mulhern (Boston College)
- F: Wally Grant (Michigan)
- F: Ron Hartwell (Colorado College)
