= 1949–50 NCAA men's ice hockey season =

- Duration: November 1949– March 18, 1950
- NCAA tournament: 1950
- National championship: Broadmoor Ice Palace; Colorado Springs, Colorado
- NCAA champion: Colorado College

The 1949–50 NCAA Division I men's ice hockey season began in November 1949 and concluded with the 1950 NCAA Men's Ice Hockey Tournament's championship game on March 18, 1950 at the Broadmoor Ice Palace in Colorado Springs, Colorado. This was the 3rd season in which an NCAA ice hockey championship was held and is the 56th year overall where an NCAA school fielded a team.

Army, who had been fielding an ice hockey team continually since 1904, elevated the program to major status in 1949.

Boston University began to sponsor ice hockey as a sport again for this season and was selected as one of the two eastern representatives for the NCAA tournament.

Denver's ice hockey program was started this year after the university finished construction of the DU Arena.

== Regular season ==
=== Season tournaments ===
Tournament	Dates	Teams	Champion
NEIHL Tournament	March 6–7	4	Boston College

=== Standings ===
1949–50 NCAA Independent ice hockey standings
	Intercollegiate							Overall					
	GP	W	L	T	Pct.	GF	GA	GP	W	L	T	GF	GA
American International	–	–	–	–	–	–	–	12	6	5	1	–	–
Army	11	3	8	0	.273	35	77	12	3	9	0	39	83
Boston College	–	–	–	–	–	–	–	19	14	5	0	122	83
Boston University	24	19	5	0	.792	170	70	24	19	5	0	170	70
Bowdoin	–	–	–	–	–	–	–	13	7	4	0	–	–
Brown	–	–	–	–	–	–	–	20	11	9	0	134	85
Clarkson	–	–	–	–	–	–	–	14	4	8	2	61	67
Colby	–	–	–	–	–	–	–	–	–	–	–	–	–
Colgate	–	–	–	–	–	–	–	15	7	7	1	63	83
Colorado College	16	12	3	1	.781	131	60	24	18	5	1	190	90
Dartmouth	–	–	–	–	–	–	–	20	11	9	0	93	86
Denver	–	–	–	–	–	–	–	17	4	13	0	50	202
Hamilton	–	–	–	–	–	–	–	13	4	9	0	–	–
Harvard	–	–	–	–	–	–	–	18	10	8	0	106	89
Lehigh	2	2	0	0	1.000	12	1	7	5	2	0	40	18
Massachusetts	–	–	–	–	–	–	–	7	2	3	2	31	45
Michigan	–	–	–	–	–	–	–	27	23	4	0	176	72
Michigan State	–	–	–	–	–	–	–	14	0	14	0	27	157
Michigan Tech	–	–	–	–	–	–	–	17	10	7	0	110	65
Middlebury	–	–	–	–	–	–	–	21	11	10	0	–	–
Minnesota	–	–	–	–	–	–	–	16	5	11	0	75	74
MIT	–	–	–	–	–	–	–	12	4	8	0	–	–
New Hampshire	–	–	–	–	–	–	–	4	0	4	0	8	28
North Dakota	–	–	–	–	–	–	–	23	15	6	2	147	95
North Dakota Agricultural	–	–	–	–	–	–	–	–	–	–	–	–	–
Northeastern	–	–	–	–	–	–	–	18	7	10	1	92	105
Norwich	–	–	–	–	–	–	–	10	6	4	0	–	–
Princeton	–	–	–	–	–	–	–	20	6	13	1	81	112
Rensselaer	–	–	–	–	–	–	–	10	4	6	0	40	58
Saint Michael's	–	–	–	–	–	–	–	7	4	3	0	46	35
St. Lawrence	–	–	–	–	–	–	–	9	9	0	0	67	32
Tufts	–	–	–	–	–	–	–	–	–	–	–	–	–
Williams	–	–	–	–	–	–	–	9	3	6	0	–	–
Wyoming	–	–	–	–	–	–	–	8	0	8	0	–	–
Yale	–	–	–	–	–	–	–	18	12	6	0	83	55

1949–50 Minnesota Intercollegiate Athletic Conference ice hockey standings
	Conference							Overall					
	GP	W	L	T	PTS	GF	GA	GP	W	L	T	GF	GA
Macalester †	–	–	–	–	–	–	–	–	–	–	–	–	–
Saint John's †	–	–	–	–	–	–	–	11	8	2	1	–	–
Augsburg	–	–	–	–	–	–	–	–	–	–	–	–	–
Concordia	–	–	–	–	–	–	–	4	1	3	0	–	–
Gustavus Adolphus	–	–	–	–	–	–	–	11	3	8	0	–	–
Hamline	–	–	–	–	–	–	–	–	–	–	–	–	–
Minnesota–Duluth	8	4	3	1	.563	–	–	8	4	3	1	–	–
St. Olaf	–	–	–	–	–	–	–	10	1	9	0	–	–
St. Thomas	–	–	–	–	–	–	–	13	9	4	0	–	–
† indicates conference champion

== 1950 NCAA Tournament ==
Semifinals; March 16–17
E1	Boston College	3
W2	Colorado College	10
W1	Michigan	3
E2	Boston University	4

National championship March 18
W2	Colorado College	13
E2	Boston University	4
Third-place game
E1	Boston College	6
W1	Michigan	10

Note: * denotes overtime period(s)

== Player stats ==
=== Scoring leaders ===
The following players led the league in points at the conclusion of the season.

GP = Games played; G = Goals; A = Assists; Pts = Points; PIM = Penalty minutes

Player	Class	Team	GP	G	A	Pts	PIM
Jack Garrity	Sophomore	Boston University	–	51	33	84	37
Gil Burford	Junior	Michigan	27	40	29	69	20
Harry Whitworth	Senior	Colorado College	–	25	35	60	14
Neil Celley	Junior	Michigan	27	33	23	56	30
Arnold Oss	Senior	Dartmouth	–	36	19	55	–
Milt Johnson	Junior	North Dakota	23	35	15	50	22
Buzz Johnson	Junior	North Dakota	23	27	23	50	43
Bill Munro	Sophomore	Clarkson	14	23	24	47	–
Chris Ray	Junior	Colorado College	–	31	13	44	19
Warren Lewis	Senior	Boston College	–	26	17	43	–

=== Leading goaltenders ===
The following goaltenders led the league in goals against average at the end of the regular season while playing at least 33% of their team's total minutes.

GP = Games played; Min = Minutes played; W = Wins; L = Losses; OT = Overtime/shootout losses; GA = Goals against; SO = Shutouts; SV% = Save percentage; GAA = Goals against average

Player	Class	Team	GP	Min	W	L	OT	GA	SO	SV%	GAA
James Burns	Senior	Yale	-	-	-	-	-	-	-	-	3.00
Bob Murray	Senior	North Dakota	-	-	-	-	-	-	0	.886	4.09
Gene Delvecchio	Junior	St. Lawrence	12	723	-	-	-	50	0	-	4.15
Ralph Engelstad	Sophomore	North Dakota	-	-	-	-	-	-	0	.867	4.17
George DeLange	Sophomore	Denver	10	-	4	-	-	-	0	.777	9.63
Delmar Reid	Sophomore	Michigan State	10	-	-	-	-	-	-	-	11.20

== Awards ==
=== NCAA ===
Award		Recipient
Most Outstanding Player in NCAA Tournament		Ralph Bevins, Boston University
AHCA All-American Team
First Team	Position	Second Team
Ralph Bevins, Boston University	G	Jack McDonald, Michigan
Ross Smith, Michigan	D	Joe McCusker, Boston College
Jim Starrak, Colorado College	D	Daniel McKinnon, North Dakota
Jack Garrity, Boston University	F	Len Ceglarski, Boston College
Warren Lewis, Boston College	F	Buzz Johnson, North Dakota
Arnold Oss, Dartmouth	F	Chris Ray, Colorado College
