= List of Brown Bears men's ice hockey seasons =

This is a season-by-season list of records compiled by Brown in men's ice hockey.

Brown University has made four appearances in the NCAA Tournament, winning two of seven games played and reaching the championship game in 1951.

== Season-by-season results ==
Note: GP = Games played, W = Wins, L = Losses, T = Ties

NCAA D-I Champions	NCAA Frozen Four	Conference regular season champions	Conference Playoff Champions

Season	Conference	Regular season (Note: Code explanation; GP—Games Played, W—Wins, L—Losses, T—Tied games, OTW—Overtime Wins, OTL—Overtime Loses, 3/SW—Win in 3 on 3 overtime or shootout, Pts—Points*)														Conference tournament results	National tournament results
Season	Conference	Conference									Overall					Conference tournament results	National tournament results
Season	Conference	GP	W	L	T	OTW	OTL	3/SW	Pts*	Finish	GP	W	L	T	%	Conference tournament results	National tournament results
No Coach (1897–1906)
1897–98	IHA	4	3	0	1	–	–	–	.875	1st	6	4	1	1	.750		Intercollegiate Champion
1898–99	IHA	3	1	2	0	–	–	–	.333	3rd	5	3	2	0	.600		
1899–1900	IHA	4	0	3	1	–	–	–	.125	T–3rd	7	1	5	1	.214		
1900–01	IHA	4	4	0	0	–	–	–	1.000	1st	9	4	4	1	.500	Lost Championship series, 0–2 (Yale)	
1901–02	IHA	4	1	3	0	–	–	–	.250	4th	6	2	4	0	.333		
1902–03	IHA	4	0	4	0	–	–	–	.000	5th	7	1	6	0	.167		
1903–04	IHA	4	0	4	0	–	–	–	.000	5th	5	1	4	0	.200		
1904–05	IHA	4	0	4	0	–	–	–	.000	5th	5	0	5	0	.000		
1905–06	IHA	4	0	4	0	–	–	–	.000	5th	8	0	8	0	.000		
Program suspended
Jimmy Gardner (1926–1927)
1926–27	Independent	–	–	–	–	–	–	–	–	–	8	4	4	0	.500		
Jean Dubuc (1927–1929)
1927–28	Independent	–	–	–	–	–	–	–	–	–	12	4	8	0	.333		
1928–29	Independent	–	–	–	–	–	–	–	–	–	13	8	5	0	.615		
Thomas Taylor (1929–1931)
1929–30	Independent	–	–	–	–	–	–	–	–	–	12	8	3	1	.708		
1930–31	Independent	–	–	–	–	–	–	–	–	–	10	9	1	0	.900		
Robert Taylor (1931–1933)
1931–32	Independent	–	–	–	–	–	–	–	–	–	11	5	6	0	.455		
1932–33	Independent	–	–	–	–	–	–	–	–	–	13	6	6	1	.500		
Thomas Taylor (1933–1938)
1933–34	Independent	–	–	–	–	–	–	–	–	–	11	8	3	0	.727		
1934–35	Independent	–	–	–	–	–	–	–	–	–	14	7	7	0	.500		
1935–36	Independent	–	–	–	–	–	–	–	–	–	12	7	5	0	.583		
1936–37	Independent	–	–	–	–	–	–	–	–	–	10	6	4	0	.600		
1937–38	Independent	–	–	–	–	–	–	–	–	–	14	5	9	0	.357		
Arthur Lesieur (1938–1939)
1938–39	Independent	–	–	–	–	–	–	–	–	–	13	6	7	0	.462		
Program suspended due to World War II
Westcott Moulton (1947–1952)
1947–48	Independent	–	–	–	–	–	–	–	–	–	14	5	9	0	.550		
1948–49	Pentagonal League	8	4	4	0	–	–	–	.500	3rd	14	7	7	0	.500		
1949–50	Pentagonal League	8	6	2	0	–	–	–	.750	1st	20	11	9	0	.550		
1950–51	Pentagonal League	8	6	2	0	–	–	–	.750	1st	24	18	6	0	.750		Won Semifinal, 8–4 (Colorado College); Lost Championship, 1–7 (Michigan)
1951–52	Pentagonal League	8	6	2	0	–	–	–	.750	2nd	21	13	7	1	.643		
Donald Whiston (1952–1955)
1952–53	Pentagonal League	8	3	5	0	–	–	–	.375	4th	17	6	11	0	.353		
1953–54	Pentagonal League	8	4	4	0	–	–	–	.500	3rd	20	12	8	0	.600		
1954–55	Pentagonal League	8	4	3	1	–	–	–	.563	T–2nd	18	9	8	1	.528		
James Fullerton (1955–1970)
1955–56	Ivy League	8	4	4	0	–	–	–	.500	T–3rd	19	10	9	0	.522		
1956–57	Ivy League	8	1	7	0	–	–	–	.125	T–4th	20	6	14	0	.300		
1957–58	Ivy League	8	4	4	0	–	–	–	.500	T–2nd	23	11	10	2	.522		
1958–59	Ivy League	10	4	6	0	–	–	–	.400	4th	24	10	14	0	.417		
1959–60	Ivy League	10	5	5	0	–	–	–	.500	T–3rd	26	13	13	0	.500		
1960–61	Ivy League	9	0	9	0	–	–	–	.000	6th	20	0	20	0	.000		
1961–62	ECAC Hockey	24	7	17	0	–	–	–	.292	24th	24	7	17	0	.292		
1962–63	ECAC Hockey	22	15	6	1	–	–	–	.705	9th	24	16	7	1	.688	Lost Quarterfinal, 1–3 (Clarkson)	
1963–64	ECAC Hockey	22	12	8	2	–	–	–	.591	12th	24	13	9	2	.583		
University Division
1964–65	ECAC Hockey	22	16	6	0	–	–	–	.727	4th	30	21	9	0	.700	Won Quarterfinal, 4–3 (Cornell); Won Semifinal, 2–5 (Boston University); Lost Championship, 2–6 (Boston College)	Lost Semifinal, 0–4 (Michigan Tech); Lost Consolation Game, 5–9 (North Dakota)
1965–66	ECAC Hockey	18	12	6	0	–	–	–	.667	4th	25	16	9	0	.640	Won Quarterfinal, 4–2 (St. Lawrence); Lost Semifinal, 1–2 (Clarkson); Lost Third-place game, 2–5 (Boston University)	
1966–67	ECAC Hockey	16	8	8	0	–	–	–	.500	8th	24	13	11	0	.542	Lost Quarterfinal, 2–11 (Cornell)	
1967–68	ECAC Hockey	20	12	6	2	–	–	–	.625	6th	24	15	7	2	.667	Lost Quarterfinal, 3–7 (Clarkson)	
1968–69	ECAC Hockey	20	10	9	1	–	–	–	.550	8th	22	10	11	1	.477		
1969–70	ECAC Hockey	21	14	6	1	–	–	–	.690	5th	24	15	8	1	.646	Lost Quarterfinal, 5–6 (Clarkson)	
J. Allan Soares (1970–1974)
1970–71	ECAC Hockey	19	13	6	0	–	–	–	.684	5th	23	13	10	0	.565	Lost Quarterfinal, 3–4 (Harvard)	
1971–72	ECAC Hockey	21	9	11	1	–	–	–	.482	11th	23	10	12	1	.457		
1972–73	ECAC Hockey	19	10	9	0	–	–	–	.526	9th	23	11	12	0	.478		
Division I
1973–74	ECAC Hockey	18	7	11	0	–	–	–	.389	13th	23	10	13	0	.435		
Richard Toomey (1974–1978)
1974–75	ECAC Hockey	22	13	8	1	–	–	–	.614	7th	25	15	9	1	.620	Lost Quarterfinal, 4–5 (OT) (Boston University)	
1975–76	ECAC Hockey	23	18	5	0	–	–	–	.783	3rd	30	23	7	0	.767	Won Quarterfinal, 5–4 (Dartmouth); Won Semifinal, 6–2 (Cornell); Lost Championship, 2–9 (Boston University)	Lost Semifinal, 6–7 (Michigan Tech); Won Consolation Game, 8–7 (Boston University)
1976–77	ECAC Hockey	21	12	9	0	–	–	–	.571	7th	27	16	11	0	.593	Lost Quarterfinal, 3–4 (New Hampshire)	
1977–78	ECAC Hockey	23	13	9	1	–	–	–	.587	6th	29	14	14	1	.500	Won Quarterfinal, 6–2 (Clarkson); Lost Semifinal, 2–6 (Boston College); Lost Third-place game, 4–8 (Boston University)	
Paul Schilling (1978–1982)
1978–79	ECAC Hockey	21	10	11	0	–	–	–	.476	10th	25	11	14	0	.444		
1979–80	ECAC Hockey	22	9	11	2	–	–	–	.455	10th	26	10	14	2	.423		
1980–81	ECAC Hockey	22	3	18	1	–	–	–	.159	17th	26	5	20	1	.212		
1981–82	ECAC Hockey	22	6	15	0	–	–	–	.286	16th	26	8	18	0	.308		
Herb Hammond (1982–1988)
1982–83	ECAC Hockey	21	2	18	1	–	–	–	.119	17th	25	3	21	1	.140		
1983–84	ECAC Hockey	21	5	15	1	–	–	–	.262	T–15th	26	6	19	1	.250		
1984–85	ECAC Hockey	21	6	15	0	–	–	–	12	9th	26	9	17	0	.346		
1985–86	ECAC Hockey	21	3	19	0	–	–	–	6	12th	23	4	19	0	.174		
1986–87	ECAC Hockey	22	9	13	0	–	–	–	18	T–7th	27	11	16	0	.407	Lost Quarterfinal series, 0–2 (Harvard)	
1987–88	ECAC Hockey	22	2	19	1	–	–	–	5	12th	26	3	22	1	.135		
Bob Gaudet (1988–1997)
1988–89	ECAC Hockey	22	1	21	0	–	–	–	2	12th	26	1	25	0	.038		
1989–90	ECAC Hockey	22	8	11	3	–	–	–	19	8th	29	10	16	3	.397	Won First Round, 7–5 (Vermont); Lost Quarterfinal series, 0–2 (Rensselaer)	
1990–91	ECAC Hockey	22	9	11	2	–	–	–	20	T–8th	27	9	15	3	.389	Lost First Round, 1–2 (Yale)	
1991–92	ECAC Hockey	22	10	8	4	–	–	–	24	T–5th	30	11	15	4	.433	Lost Quarterfinal, 3–6 (Clarkson)	
1992–93	ECAC Hockey	22	13	7	2	–	–	–	28	T–3rd	31	16	12	3	.565	Won Quarterfinal series, 1–0–1 (Yale); Won Semifinal, 3–1 (Harvard); Lost Championship, 1–3 (Clarkson)	Lost Regional Quarterfinal, 3–7 (Minnesota–Duluth)
1993–94	ECAC Hockey	22	12	7	3	–	–	–	27	4th	32	15	13	4	.531	Won Quarterfinal series, 2–1 (Vermont); Lost Semifinal, 1–5 (Harvard); Lost Third-place game, 4–6 (Clarkson)	
1994–95	ECAC Hockey	22	13	7	2	–	–	–	28	2nd	30	15	12	3	.550	Lost Quarterfinal series, 1–2 (Princeton)	
1995–96	ECAC Hockey	22	5	11	6	–	–	–	16	T–7th	32	9	15	8	.406	Won First Round, 4–3 (Princeton); Lost Quarterfinal series, 0–2 (Clarkson)	
1996–97	ECAC Hockey	22	4	16	2	–	–	–	10	12th	29	7	19	3	.293		
Roger Grillo (1997–2009)
1997–98	ECAC Hockey	22	11	9	2	–	–	–	24	4th	31	13	16	2	.452	Lost First Round series, 1–2 (Princeton)	
1998–99	ECAC Hockey	22	5	12	5	–	–	–	15	10th	31	9	16	6	.387	Lost First Round series, 0–2 (Clarkson)	
1999–2000	ECAC Hockey	21	4	15	2	–	–	–	10	11th	28	6	19	3	.268		
2000–01	ECAC Hockey	22	2	16	4	–	–	–	8	12th	29	4	21	4	.207		
2001–02	ECAC Hockey	22	10	10	2	–	–	–	22	T–6th	31	14	15	2	.484	Lost First Round series, 0–2 (Harvard)	
2002–03	ECAC Hockey	22	10	8	4	–	–	–	24	5th	35	16	14	5	.528	Won First Round series, 2–0 (Princeton); Won Quarterfinal series, 2–1 (Yale); Lost Semifinal, 0–2 (Cornell); Lost Third-place game, 2–4 (Dartmouth)	
2003–04	ECAC Hockey	22	13	7	2	–	–	–	28	3rd	31	15	11	5	.565	Lost Quarterfinal series, 0–2 (Harvard)	
2004–05	ECAC Hockey	22	9	11	2	–	–	–	20	6th	33	16	14	3	.530	Won First Round series, 2–0 (Rensselaer); Lost Quarterfinal series, 0–2 (Colgate)	
2005–06	ECAC Hockey	22	3	14	5	–	–	–	11	12th	32	5	20	7	.266	Lost First Round series, 1–2 (St. Lawrence)	
2006–07	ECAC Hockey	22	6	12	4	–	–	–	16	11th	32	11	15	6	.438	Lost First Round series, 1–2 (Princeton)	
2007–08	ECAC Hockey	22	6	13	3	–	–	–	15	T–10th	31	6	21	4	.258	Lost First Round series, 0–2 (Quinnipiac)	
2008–09	ECAC Hockey	22	3	15	4	–	–	–	10	12th	33	5	23	5	.227	Won First Round series, 2–0 (Harvard); Lost Quarterfinal series, 0–2 (Yale)	
Brendan Whittet (2009–present)
2009–10	ECAC Hockey	22	6	12	4	–	–	–	16	11th	37	13	20	4	.405	Won First Round series, 2–1 (Rensselaer); Won Quarterfinal series, 2–1 (Yale); Lost Semifinal, 0–3 (Cornell); Lost Third-place game, 0–3 (St. Lawrence)	
2010–11	ECAC Hockey	22	8	12	2	–	–	–	18	9th	31	10	16	5	.403	Lost First Round series, 0–2 (Quinnipiac)	
2011–12	ECAC Hockey	22	5	13	4	–	–	–	14	12th	32	9	18	5	.359	Lost First Round series, 1–2 (Quinnipiac)	
2012–13	ECAC Hockey	22	8	10	4	–	–	–	20	T–7th	36	16	14	6	.528	Won First Round series, 2–0 (Clarkson); Won Quarterfinal series, 2–1 (Rensselaer); Won Semifinal, 4–0 (Quinnipiac); Lost Championship, 1–3 (Union)	
2013–14	ECAC Hockey	22	8	13	1	–	–	–	17	9th	31	11	17	3	.403	Lost First Round series, 0–2 (St. Lawrence)	
2014–15	ECAC Hockey	22	5	14	3	–	–	–	13	11th	31	8	20	3	.306	Lost First Round series, 0–2 (Harvard)	
2015–16	ECAC Hockey	22	3	13	6	–	–	–	12	11th	31	5	19	7	.242	Lost First Round series, 0–2 (Rensselaer)	
2016–17	ECAC Hockey	22	3	18	1	–	–	–	7	12th	31	4	25	2	.161	Lost First Round series, 0–2 (Quinnipiac)	
2017–18	ECAC Hockey	22	7	14	1	–	–	–	15	10th	31	8	19	4	.323	Lost First Round series, 0–2 (Princeton)	
2018–19	ECAC Hockey	22	8	9	5	–	–	–	21	8th	34	15	14	5	.515	Won First Round series, 2–0 (Princeton); Won Quarterfinal series, 2–0 (Quinnipiac); Lost Semifinal, 0–6 (Cornell)	
2019–20	ECAC Hockey	22	8	12	2	–	–	–	18	9th	31	8	21	2	.290	Lost First Round series, 0–2 (Colgate)	
2020–21	ECAC Hockey	Season Cancelled															
2021–22	ECAC Hockey	22	6	12	4	0	1	2	25	9th	31	7	20	4	.290	Lost First Round series, 1–2 (St. Lawrence)	
2022–23	ECAC Hockey	22	5	14	3	0	1	1	20	11th	30	9	18	3	.350	Lost First Round, 1–5 (Clarkson)	
2023–24	ECAC Hockey	22	6	14	2	2	3	1	22	11th	30	8	19	3	.317	Lost First Round, 0–6 (Union)	
2024–25	ECAC Hockey	22	9	11	2	3	0	2	28	8th	32	14	15	3	.484	Won First Round, 3–2 (Princeton); Lost Quarterfinal series, 0–2 (Quinnipiac)	
Totals											GP	W	L	T	%	Championships	
Regular Season											2167	853	1148	166	.432	2 Pentagonal Championships	
Conference Post-season											119	41	77	1	.349		
NCAA Post-season											7	2	5	0	.286	4 NCAA Tournament appearances	
Regular Season and Post-season Record											2293	896	1230	167	.427		

* Winning percentage is used when conference schedules are unbalanced.
The Ivy League is an unofficial ice hockey conference.
