= James Fullerton =

James Fullerton may refer to:

- James Fullerton (ice hockey) (1909–1991), American ice hockey coach and referee
- James Fullerton (courtier) (c. 1563–1631), Scottish courtier and politician
