= Bob Wheeler (ice hockey) =

American ice hockey player (1931–2021)

- Born: January 7, 1931 Wakefield, Massachusetts, US
- Died: April 13, 2021 (aged 90) Hamilton, Massachusetts
- Position: Left wing
- Played for: Brown
- Playing career: 1949–1952
- Military career
- Allegiance: United States
- Branch: United States Army
- Service years: 1952–1955

Robert J. Wheeler (7 January 1931 – 13 April 2021) was an American ice hockey left wing who helped Brown reach its first and only (as of 2020) national championship game in 1951.

== Career ==
Wheeler grew up in Wakefield but was sent to Malden Catholic High School for a Catholic education at the insistence of his mother. At Malden Wheeler became a star on the ice, leading his team in scoring during his senior season and helped the Lancers go on a tremendous run in the state tournament. After defeating cross-town rival Malden High School in the semifinal in front of a packed house at the Boston Garden, MC won the Massachusetts state championship over Arlington High. The win gave Malden Catholic a berth into the regional tournament where the team continued to win and captured the New England Championship with Wheeler finishing as the top scorer in all of New England.

Wheeler began attending Brown University in 1948 and made an impact on the ice hockey team the following year. Wheeler helped the Bears win their first league championship in almost 50 years and set a program record with 11 wins. As a junior he nearly doubled his goal total, finishing with 33, setting another program record. Brown won its second Pentagonal League championship (the last time Brown won a conference title as of 2020) and finished the regular season with a 17–5 record. Brown received the top eastern seed and made its first appearance in the NCAA tournament where they dominated defending champion Colorado College 8–4 in the first game. The Bears' luck ran out in the final and they were completely swamped by Michigan, being outshot 20–52 in the game and losing 1–7. Wheeler assisted on Brown's only goal of the match.

In his senior season Wheeler kept scoring for the Bears but several graduations in 1951 caused Brown to slip just enough to miss the tournament. Wheeler finished the year with 36 goals in 22 games, a new program record that stands as of 2020, and 86 goals for his career (another program record as of 2020). He was selected as an AHCA First Team All-American and was one of the top goal-scorers in the nation.

After graduating from Brown Wheeler joined the army and served in Korea. After returning he began a career working for IBM. In the fall of 1955, Wheeler attended a training camp for the US National team for the upcoming Winter Olympics and felt that he had a good chance to make the squad. He went to his manager at IBM and requested a 6-month leave to participate but, having worked at the company for only 3 months, Wheeler was denied and his Olympic hopes ended. The missed opportunity remained one of Wheeler's biggest regrets.

Wheeler was inducted into the Brown Athletic Hall of Fame in 1971 and the Massachusetts Hockey Hall of Fame in 2007.

Later in life, Wheeler became an outstanding golfer under the tutelage of William “Wild Bill” Ezinicki and went on to win the club championship at New Seabury Country Club as well as the senior club championship at Essex County Club.

== Personal ==
Wheeler moved to Hamilton in 1969, where he and his wife Diane raised their five children. His oldest son, Bob Jr., played college hockey at Harvard and also played on a team that made the championship game in 1983.

== Statistics ==
=== Regular season and playoffs ===
			Regular season					Playoffs
Season	Team	League	GP	G	A	Pts	PIM	GP	G	A	Pts	PIM
1949–50	Brown	Pen. League	—	17	18	35	—	—	—	—	—	—
1950–51	Brown	Pen. League	23	33	27	60	—	—	—	—	—	—
1951–52	Brown	Pen. League	—	36	18	54	—	—	—	—	—	—
NCAA totals			—	86	63	149	—	—	—	—	—	—

== Awards and honors ==
Award	Year
AHCA First Team All-American	1951–52
