= 2013 ECAC Hockey men's ice hockey tournament =

2013 ECAC Men's ice hockey tournament
- 2013 ECAC Hockey Men's Ice Hockey Tournament logo
- Dates: March 8–23, 2013
- Teams: 12
- Finals site: Boardwalk Hall; Atlantic City, New Jersey
- Champions: Union (2nd title)
- Winning coach: Rick Bennett (2nd title)
- MVP: Troy Grosenick (Union)
- ECAC Men's Ice Hockey Tournaments

The 2013 ECAC Hockey Men's Ice Hockey Tournament was played between March 8 and March 23, 2013 at campus locations and at Boardwalk Hall in Atlantic City, New Jersey, United States. Union College was the winner of the tournament for the second year in a row and received the ECAC Hockey's automatic bid to the 2013 NCAA Division I Men's Ice Hockey Tournament.

== Format ==
The tournament features four rounds of play. In the first round, the fifth and twelfth, sixth and eleventh, seventh and tenth, and eighth and ninth seeds as determined by the final regular season standings play a best-of-three series, with the winner advancing to the quarterfinals. There, the first seed and lowest-ranked first-round winner, the second seed and second-lowest-ranked first-round winner, the third seed and second-highest-ranked first-round winner, and the fourth seed and highest-ranked first-round winner play a best-of-three series, with the winner advancing to the semifinals. In the semifinals, the highest and lowest seeds and second-highest and second-lowest seeds play a single game, with the winner advancing to the championship game and the loser advancing to the third-place game. The tournament champion receives an automatic bid to the 2013 NCAA Division I Men's Ice Hockey Tournament.

=== Regular season standings ===
Note: GP = Games played; W = Wins; L = Losses; T = Ties; PTS = Points; GF = Goals For; GA = Goals Against

2012–13 ECAC Hockey standings
	Conference record							Overall record					
	GP	W	L	T	PTS	GF	GA	GP	W	L	T	GF	GA
#2 Quinnipiac †	22	17	2	3	37	73	32	43	30	8	5	130	72
Rensselaer	22	12	7	3	27	61	49	37	18	14	5	106	88
#1 Yale	22	12	9	1	25	60	62	37	22	12	3	107	96
#10 Union *	22	10	8	4	24	64	52	40	22	13	5	123	85
Dartmouth	22	9	9	4	22	56	57	34	15	14	5	94	88
St. Lawrence	22	9	9	4	22	60	68	38	18	16	4	107	109
Brown	22	7	9	6	20	54	51	36	16	14	6	90	85
Princeton	22	8	10	4	20	52	60	31	10	16	5	72	89
Cornell	22	8	11	3	19	49	55	34	15	16	3	83	91
Clarkson	22	8	11	3	19	58	67	36	9	20	7	89	113
Colgate	22	6	13	3	15	52	66	36	14	18	4	109	102
Harvard	22	6	14	2	14	45	65	32	10	19	3	73	101
Championship: March 23, 2013 † indicates conference regular season champion (Cleary Cup) * indicates conference tournament champion (Whitelaw Cup); Rankings: USCHO.com Top 20 Poll

== Bracket ==
First round March 8–10
5	Dartmouth	1	4	6
12	Harvard	2	1	3
6	St. Lawrence	4	4	—
11	Colgate	2	1	—
7	Brown	3	4	—
10	Clarkson	0	3	—
8	Princeton	0	2	—
9	Cornell	4	4	—

Quarterfinals; March 15–17
1	Quinnipiac	2	10	3**
9	Cornell	3	0	2
2	Rensselaer	1	6	2
7	Brown	3	2	3
3	Yale	6	3	—
6	St. Lawrence	1	2	—
4	Union	4	5	—
5	Dartmouth	1	2	—

Semifinals; March 22
1	Quinnipiac	0
7	Brown	4
3	Yale	0
4	Union	5

Championship; March 23
4	Union	3
7	Brown	1
Third place
1	Quinnipiac	3
3	Yale	0

Note: * denotes overtime period(s)

=== First round ===
==== (5) Dartmouth vs. (12) Harvard ====
March 8	Dartmouth	1 - 2	Harvard	Thompson Arena	Recap
No scoring		First period	No scoring
No scoring		Second period	09:53 - Desmond Bergin (Fick, Gozzo)
(O'Brien, Mosey) Jesse Beamish - 09:47		Third period	17:15 - GW - Brian Hart (Everson, Criscuolo)
( 22 saves / 24 shots ) Cab Morris		Goalie stats	Raphaël Girard ( 39 saves / 40 shots )

March 9	Dartmouth	4 - 1	Harvard	Thompson Arena	Recap
(Sikura, Lindblad) Dustin Walsh - 09:28		First period	No scoring
(Neiley, Robinson) Tyler Sikura - GW PP - 06:44		Second period	08:43 - PP - Alex Fallstrom (Biega, Greiner)
(Patterson, Lindblad) Mike Keenan - 02:49 (Sikura, Boldt) Matt Lindblad - 15:14		Third period	No scoring
( 23 saves / 24 shots ) Charles Grant		Goalie stats	Raphaël Girard ( 31 saves / 35 shots )

March 10	Dartmouth	6 - 3	Harvard	Thompson Arena	Recap
No scoring		First period	19:28 - Luke Greiner (unassisted)
(Goodship, Robinson) Brad Schierhorn - 02:28 (Keenan, Mosey) Tim O'Brien - 06:37 (Sikura, Boldt) Matt Lindblad - 07:26		Second period	No scoring
(Dempsey, Boldt) Nick Bligh - GW - 03:37 (Lindblad, Pinkston) Dustin Walsh - 14:42 (Goodship) Brad Schierhorn - EN - 18:14		Third period	07:34 - Luke Greiner (unassisted); 17:05 - PP EA - Desmond Bergin (Fallstrom, Greiner)
( 28 saves / 31 shots ) Charles Grant		Goalie stats	Raphaël Girard ( 20 saves / 24 shots ) / Peter Traber ( 5 saves / 6 shots )

Dartmouth wins series 2-1

==== (6) St. Lawrence vs. (11) Colgate ====
March 8	St. Lawrence	4 - 2	Colgate	Appleton Arena	Recap
(Dewey, Baker) Patrick Doherty - 08:53 (Ge. Hughes, Thompson) Gunnar Hughes - 19:10 (Essery, Martin) Jeremy Wick - GW - 19:55		First period	No scoring
(Flanagan, Ge. Hughes) Greg Carey - PP - 10:56		Second period	No scoring
No scoring		Third period	00:55 - Kyle Baun (Goulakos, Spink); 03:16 - Tylor Spink (Goulakos, Spink)
( 29 saves / 31 shots ) Matt Weninger		Goalie stats	Eric Mihalik ( 24 saves / 28 shots )

March 9	St. Lawrence	4 - 1	Colgate	Appleton Arena	Recap
(Ge. Hughes, Raley) Kyle Flanagan - 09:58 (Ge. Hughes, Flanagan) Greg Carey - GW PP - 13:43		First period	No scoring
No scoring		Second period	No scoring
(Flanagan, Carey) Justin Baker - PP - 00:25 (Flanagan, Wick) Justin Baker - PP - 14:45		Third period	13:01 - Kurtis Bartliff (Lidgett, Murphy)
( 27 saves / 28 shots ) Matt Weninger		Goalie stats	Eric Mihalik ( 22 saves / 26 shots )

St. Lawrence wins series 2-0

==== (7) Brown vs. (10) Clarkson ====
March 8	Brown	3 - 0	Clarkson	Meehan Auditorium	Recap
(Lorito, Lappin) Mark Naclerio - GW PP - 15:45		First period	No scoring
No scoring		Second period	No scoring
(Naclerio, Lappin) Matt Lorito - 06:25 (Hourihan, Ryan) Joey de Concilys - EN - 19:45		Third period	No scoring
( 31 saves / 31 shots ) Anthony Borelli		Goalie stats	Greg Lewis ( 25 saves / 27 shots )

March 9	Brown	4 - 3	Clarkson	Meehan Auditorium	Recap
(Lappin, Naclerio) Matt Lorito - PP - 08:16 (Hathaway) Jake Goldberg - 12:31 (Hathaway, Lappin) Dennis Robertson - 16:28		First period	17:21 - Joe Zarbo (Pokulok, M. Zarbo)
No scoring		Second period	No scoring
(Zaires, Juola) Jake Goldberg - GW PP - 13:10		Third period	05:49 - Jarrett Burton (Sexton, Frederick); 16:41 - Jarrett Burton (Sexton)
( 34 saves / 37 shots ) Anthony Borelli		Goalie stats	Greg Lewis ( 16 saves / 20 shots ) / Cody Rosen ( 3 saves / 3 shots )

Brown wins series 2-0

==== (8) Princeton vs. (9) Cornell ====
March 8	Princeton	0 - 4	Cornell	Hobey Baker Memorial Rink	Recap
No scoring		First period	No scoring
No scoring		Second period	08:51 - GW - Joakim Ryan (Ferlin, Lowry); 12:39 - John Esposito (Willcox)
No scoring		Third period	02:29 - Christian Hilbrich (Ryan); 11:15 - EN - John McCarron (unassisted)
( 24 saves / 27 shots ) Mike Condon		Goalie stats	Andy Iles ( 26 saves / 26 shots )

March 9	Princeton	2 - 4	Cornell	Hobey Baker Memorial Rink	Recap
(Calof, Ambrosia) Will MacDonald - PP - 12:27		First period	No scoring
No scoring		Second period	03:01 - Brian Ferlin (Willcox, Miller)
(Farris) Andrew Calof - EA - 19:15		Third period	01:32 - Nick D'Agostino (McCarron, Axell); 05:57 - GW PP - Nick D'Agostino (Miller, Ryan); 19:47 - EN - Joel Lowry (Axell, Miller)
( 29 saves / 32 shots ) Mike Condon		Goalie stats	Andy Iles ( 20 saves / 22 shots )

Cornell wins series 2-0

=== Quarterfinals ===
==== (1) Quinnipiac vs. (9) Cornell ====
March 15	Quinnipiac	2 - 3	Cornell	TD Bank Sports Center	Recap
(Peca, K. Jones) Connor Jones - PP - 05:48		First period	00:23 - PP - Brian Ferlin (Miller, Ryan)
(Peca, Barron) Kellen Jones - 03:12		Second period	05:34 - Madison Dias (Knisley, McCarron); 13:44 - GW PP - Brian Ferlin (Lowry, D'Agostino)
No scoring		Third period	No scoring
( 33 saves / 35 shots ) Eric Hartzell		Goalie stats	Andy Iles ( 17 saves / 20 shots )

March 16	Quinnipiac	10 - 0	Cornell	TD Bank Sports Center	Recap
(Peca, Davies) Connor Jones - GW - 00:24 (Currie, Arnt) Travis St. Denis - 07:40		First period	No scoring
(Arnt, Samuels-Thomas) Travis St. Denis - 02:21 (K. Jones, C. Jones) Matthew Peca - 05:36 (Federico, Bui) Cory Hibbeler - 06:27 (Langlois, Federico) Ben Arnt - 12:36 (St. Denis, C. Jones) Kellen Jones - 16:17 (Federico, Arnt) Jordan Samuels-Thomas - 17:25 (Peca, C. Jones) Kellen Jones - PP - 19:28		Second period	No scoring
(Federico, Miner-Barron) Zach Tolkinen - PP - 15:20		Third period	No scoring
( 9 saves / 9 shots ) Eric Hartzell / ( 8 saves / 8 shots ) Michael Garteig		Goalie stats	Andy Iles ( 26 saves / 32 shots ) / Omar Kanji ( 6 saves / 10 shots )

March 17	Quinnipiac	3 - 2	2OT	Cornell	TD Bank Sports Center	Recap
No scoring		First period		00:23 - PP - Braden Birch (Mowrey, Ryan)
(unassisted) Zach Tolkinen - 09:44		Second period		10:48 - Brian Ferlin (unassisted)
(Langlois, Samuels-Thomas) Clay Harvey - 18:56		Third period		No scoring
(Barron, Arnt) Kevin Bui - 14:08		Second overtime period		No scoring
( 29 saves / 31 shots ) Eric Hartzell		Goalie stats		Andy Iles ( 60 saves / 63 shots )

Quinnipiac Wins Series 2-1

==== (2) Rensselaer vs. (7) Brown ====
March 15	Rensselaer	1 - 3	Brown	Houston Field House	Recap
No scoring		First period	08:09 - PP - Matt Lorito (Lappin, Pfeil)
(Haggerty) Jacob Laliberté - PP - 19:03		Second period	No scoring
No scoring		Third period	18:16 - GW - Michael Juola (Zaires, Goldberg); 19:50 - EN - Mark Naclerio (Hathaway, Ryan)
( 26 saves / 28 shots ) Jason Kasdorf		Goalie stats	Anthony Borelli ( 26 saves / 27 shots )

March 16	Rensselaer	6 - 2	Brown	Houston Field House	Recap
No scoring		First period	No scoring
(Miller, Fulton) C. J. Lee - 05:39 (Neal, Higgs) Curtis Leonard - 09:09 (Neal, Higgs) Jacob Laliberté - GW PP - 19:31		Second period	12:14 - PP - Matt Lorito (Robertson, Pfeil); 16:40 - SH - Chris Zaires (Hathaway)
(McGowan, Curadi) Mike Zalewski - 05:59 (McGowan, Neal) Mike Zalewski - 08:38 (McGowan, Rogic) Greg Burgdoerfer - 19:51		Third period	No scoring
( 27 saves / 29 shots ) Jason Kasdorf		Goalie stats	Anthony Borelli ( 27 saves / 32 shots ) / Marco De Filippo ( 4 saves / 5 shots )

March 17	Rensselaer	2 - 3	Brown	Houston Field House	Recap
No scoring		First period	10:56 - Jake Goldberg (Zaires, Robertson); 11:46 - Matt Lorito (Lappin)
(Lee, Fulton) Mark McGowan - 17:25 (Bradley, Leboeuf) Mike Zalewski - 19:13		Second period	05:06 - GW - Nick Lappin (Naclerio, Naclerio)
No scoring		Third period	No scoring
( 14 saves / 17 shots ) Jason Kasdorf		Goalie stats	Anthony Borelli ( 40 saves / 42 shots )

Brown Wins Series 2-1

==== (3) Yale vs. (6) St. Lawrence ====
March 15	Yale	6 - 1	St. Lawrence	Ingalls Rink	Recap
(Root, Agostino) Andrew Miller - 10:40 (Young, Orzetti) Antoine Laganière - GW - 17:03		First period	07:30 - Tommy Thompson (Gu. Hughes, Ge. Hughes)
(Miller) Jesse Root - 13:22 (Laganière) Ryan Obuchowski - 18:58		Second period	No scoring
(Miller, Root) Kenny Agostino - 00:19 (Agostino, Fallen) Andrew Miller - 03:21		Third period	No scoring
( 12 saves / 13 shots ) Jeff Malcolm		Goalie stats	Matt Weninger ( 28 saves / 32 shots ) / Kyle MacDonald ( 1 save / 3 shots ) / David Grilk ( 13 saves / 13 shots )

March 16	Yale	3 - 0	St. Lawrence	Ingalls Rink	Recap
(Agostino, Wilson) Tommy Fallen - GW PP - 17:58		First period	No scoring
(Fallen, Miller) Jesse Root - PP - 14:18		Second period	No scoring
(Dueck, Wilson) Antoine Laganière - EA - 07:09		Third period	No scoring
( 17 saves / 17 shots ) Jeff Malcolm		Goalie stats	Matt Weninger ( 33 saves / 36 shots )

Yale Wins Series 2-0

==== (4) Union vs. (5) Dartmouth ====
March 15	Union	4 - 1	Dartmouth	Achilles Rink	Recap
(Gingras, Wilkins) Daniel Carr - 09:46		First period	No scoring
(Simpson) Daniel Ciampini - GW - 17:59		Second period	15:12 - Tyler Sikura (Walsh, Lindblad)
(M. Bodie, Jooris) Daniel Carr - 09:14 (unassisted) Mat Bodie - EN - 18:29		Third period	No scoring
( 31 saves / 32 shots ) Troy Grosenick		Goalie stats	Charles Grant ( 37 saves / 40 shots )

March 16	Union	5 - 2	Dartmouth	Achilles Rink	Recap
(Hatch, Novak) Kevin Sullivan - 01:32		First period	No scoring
(Ciampini) Kyle Bodie - 02:37 (Sullivan, Coburn) Shayne Gostisbehere - GW - 04:47		Second period	09:20 - SH - Eric Neiley (unassisted)
(unassisted) Josh Jooris - 11:15 (Carr, M. Bodie) Kevin Sullivan - PP - 19:00		Third period	15:03 - Dustin Walsh (unassisted)
( 28 saves / 30 shots ) Troy Grosenick		Goalie stats	Charles Grant ( 12 saves / 15 shots ) / Cab Morris ( 13 saves / 15 shots )

Union Wins Series 2-0

=== Semifinals ===
==== (1) Quinnipiac vs. (7) Brown ====
March 22	Quinnipiac	0 - 4	Brown	Boardwalk Hall	Recap
No scoring		First period	09:05 - GW - Matt Lorito (Naclerio, Lappin); 16:03 - Garnet Hathaway (Ryan)
No scoring		Second period	12:56 - Francis Drolet (Prescott, Senecal); 15:36 - PP - Matt Lorito (Naclerio, Robertson)
No scoring		Third period	No scoring
( 19 saves / 23 shots ) Eric Hartzell / ( 0 saves / 0 shots ) Michael Garteig		Goalie stats	Anthony Borelli ( 29 saves / 29 shots )

==== (3) Yale vs. (4) Union ====
March 22	Yale	0 - 5	Union	Boardwalk Hall	Recap
No scoring		First period	02:59 - GW - Wayne Simpson (K. Bodie, Stuart); 15:10 - Daniel Carr (Wilkins, Gostisbehere)
No scoring		Second period	00:21 - Max Novak (Sullivan, Coburn); 05:00 - Josh Jooris (Wilkins)
No scoring		Third period	13:20 - Sam Coatta (Ikkala, Roy)
( 30 saves / 35 shots ) Jeff Malcolm		Goalie stats	Troy Grosenick ( 34 saves / 34 shots )

=== 3rd Place Game ===
==== (1) Quinnipiac vs. (3) Yale ====
March 23	Quinnipiac	3 - 0	Yale	Boardwalk Hall	Recap
No scoring		First period	No scoring
(unassisted) Bryce Van Brabant - GW - 04:34		Second period	No scoring
(Bui, Barron) Cory Hibbeler - 02:42 (unassisted) Kevin Bui - 19:07		Third period	No scoring
( 30 saves / 30 shots ) Eric Hartzell		Goalie stats	Jeff Malcolm ( 24 saves / 27 shots )

=== Championship ===
==== (4) Union vs. (7) Brown ====
March 23	Union	3 - 1	Brown	Boardwalk Hall	Recap
(Jooris, Gingras) Daniel Carr - 10:18 (Hatch, Sullivan) Max Novak - GW - 19:46		First period	No scoring
(Coburn, Sullivan) Max Novak - 02:20		Second period	07:57 - Dennis Robertson (Naclerio, Pfeil)
No scoring		Third period	No scoring
( 32 saves / 33 shots ) Troy Grosenick		Goalie stats	Anthony Borelli ( 19 saves / 22 shots )

== Tournament awards ==
=== All-Tournament Team ===
- F Daniel Carr (Union)
- F Matt Lorito (Brown)
- F Max Novak (Union)
- D Greg Coburn (Union)
- D Dennis Robertson (Brown)
- G Troy Grosenick* (Union)

* Most Outstanding Player(s)
