= J. Allan Soares =

American ice hockey player and coach

Biographical details
- Born: April 24, 1938; Cranston, Rhode Island, U.S.
- Died: February 6, 2024 (aged 85); Sebring, Florida, U.S.

Playing career
- 1957–1960: Brown
- 1960–1961: Providence Reds
- 1961: New Haven Blades
- Position: Defenseman

Coaching career (HC unless noted)
- 1963–1970: Brown (freshman)
- 1970–1974: Brown
- 1976–1981: Roger Williams

Head coaching record
- Overall: 39-44-1 (.470)

Accomplishments and honors

Awards
- 1991 Brown Athletic Hall of Fame

John Allan Soares (April 24, 1938 – February 6, 2024) was an American ice hockey player and coach who spent more than 15 years involved with Brown.

After starring for the Bears as a defenseman, Soares played minor league hockey for the Providence Reds and New Haven Blades and Senior ice hockey for the Rockland Estes, Norwalk Home Oilers, Eastern Olympics, Walpole Four Seasons, and Cranston Wild Sportsmen.

He returned to Brown in 1963 and coached the freshman for seven seasons before replacing his former head coach James Fullerton in 1970. He was fired on February 7, 1974 by athletic director Andy Geiger due to the on-ice "conduct of [his] players and the atmosphere surrounding the hockey program" following a game where Brown drew 11 penalties and injured three Harvard players. His overall record at Brown was 39–44–1.

After leaving Brown, Soares coached at Roger Williams College and was a scout for the St. Louis Blues. Outside of hockey, he worked in financial services, first with New England Financial, then with his own firm, Benefit Development Group. In 1991, he was inducted into the Brown Athletic Hall of Fame. Soares spent his later years in Sebring, Florida. He died there on February 6, 2024.

== Head coaching record ==
Record table
Season	Team	Overall	Conference	Standing	Postseason
Brown Bears (ECAC Hockey) (1970–1974)
1970–71	Brown	13–10–0	13–6–0	5th	ECAC Quarterfinals
1971–72	Brown	10–12–1	9–11–1	11th	
1972–73	Brown	11–12–0	10–9–0	9th	
1973–74	Brown	5–10–0	2–8–0	13th	
Brown:		39–44–1	34–34–1		
Total:		39–44–1			
National champion Postseason invitational champion Conference regular season champion Conference regular season and conference tournament champion Division regular season champion Division regular season and conference tournament champion Conference tournament champion
