= Thomas W. Taylor =

American coach and administrator (1899–1975)

Biographical details
- Born: March 18, 1899; Brookline, Massachusetts, U.S.
- Died: September 18, 1975 (aged 76); Providence, Rhode Island, U.S.

Coaching career (HC unless noted)
- 1929–1931: Brown
- 1933–1938: Brown

Administrative career (AD unless noted)
- 1926–1938: Brown (assistant)
- 1938–1943: Brown

Head coaching record
- Overall: 50–32–1 (.608)

Thomas W. Taylor (March 28, 1899 – September 18, 1975) was an American coach and administrator who was head coach of the Brown Bears men's ice hockey from 1929 to 1931 and 1933 to 1938 and the school's director of athletics from 1938 to 1942.

== Biography ==
Taylor graduated from Brookline High School, where he played baseball and hockey. He attended Brown University and was manager of the 1924 Brown Bears football team. He graduated in 1925 and returned to Brookline, where he worked in banking for a year.

In 1926, Taylor returned to Brown as an assistant to athletic director Frederick W. Marvel. In 1929, he was named head coach of Brown's varsity and freshmen hockey teams. He ceded coaching duties to his brother, Bob Taylor, for two seasons before returning to the bench in 1933. Taylor became Brown's acting athletic director following Marvel's death on August 10, 1938. He gave up coaching for good and was succeeded by Art Lesieur. On December 9, 1938, Taylor was named Brown's full time athletic director.

In 1943, Taylor left Brown to join the United States Army Corps of Engineers. He served as a Special Services officer in Oak Ridge, Tennessee during World War II and was discharged in 1946. He died on September 18, 1975, at Rhode Island Hospital and was buried at Swan Point Cemetery.
