= Dennis Robertson (ice hockey) =

Canadian ice hockey player

- Born: May 24, 1991 (age 35) Fort St. John, British Columbia, Canada
- Height: 6 ft 1 in (185 cm)
- Weight: 216 lb (98 kg; 15 st 6 lb)
- Position: Defence
- Shoots: Left
- ICEHL team Former teams: EC Red Bull Salzburg; Charlotte Checkers; Rockford IceHogs; HC Bolzano; HC Dynamo Pardubice
- NHL draft: 173rd overall, 2011; Toronto Maple Leafs
- Playing career: 2014–present

Dennis Robertson (born May 24, 1991) is a Canadian professional ice hockey defenceman. He is currently playing with EC Red Bull Salzburg in the ICE Hockey League (ICEHL). Robertson was selected by the Toronto Maple Leafs in the sixth round (173rd overall) of the 2011 NHL entry draft.

== Playing career ==
Robertson played four seasons of NCAA Division I hockey with the Brown Bears men's ice hockey team where his outstanding play was recognized when he was named to the 2010–11 ECAC Hockey All-Rookie Team in his freshman year, and was named to the 2013–14 All-Ivy League First Team in his senior year.

On March 20, 2014, the Carolina Hurricanes of the National Hockey League (NHL) signed Robertson as a free agent to a two-year, entry-level contract, and he was immediately assigned to play with the Charlotte Checkers of the AHL.

Prior to the 2015–16 season, on September 11, 2015, he was traded to the Chicago Blackhawks along with prospect Jake Massie and a 2017 fifth-round pick for forwards Kris Versteeg and Joakim Nordstrom, as well as a 2017 third-round pick. Robertson struggled to adapt with the Rockford IceHogs, posting 5 points in 37 games before on February 29, 2016, he was returned to the Hurricanes in a trade for goaltender Drew MacIntyre.

At the conclusion of his contract with the Hurricanes after the 2017–18 season, Robertson was not tendered a qualifying offer to become a free agent. Robertson opted to continue his tenure with the Checkers in returning for his sixth season with the club in securing a one-year AHL contract on July 12, 2018.

After helping the Checkers capture the Calder Cup in his sixth season with the club in 2018–19, Robertson left North America as a free agent, agreeing to his first European contract on a one-year deal with the Italian outfit, HC Bolzano of the EBEL, on July 5, 2019.

== Career statistics ==
| | | | Regular season | | | | | Playoffs |
| Season | Team | League | GP | G | A | Pts | PIM | GP | G | A | Pts | PIM |
|---|---|---|---|---|---|---|---|---|---|---|---|---|
| 2008–09 | Langley Chiefs | BCHL | 55 | 1 | 11 | 12 | 64 | 4 | 0 | 1 | 1 | 4 |
| 2009–10 | Langley Chiefs | BCHL | 53 | 9 | 25 | 34 | 83 | 10 | 2 | 2 | 4 | 14 |
| 2010–11 | Brown University | ECAC | 30 | 6 | 11 | 17 | 48 | — | — | — | — | — |
| 2011–12 | Brown University | ECAC | 32 | 2 | 14 | 16 | 72 | — | — | — | — | — |
| 2012–13 | Brown University | ECAC | 36 | 3 | 17 | 20 | 69 | — | — | — | — | — |
| 2013–14 | Brown University | ECAC | 30 | 6 | 11 | 17 | 78 | — | — | — | — | — |
| 2013–14 | Charlotte Checkers | AHL | 1 | 0 | 0 | 0 | 0 | — | — | — | — | — |
| 2014–15 | Charlotte Checkers | AHL | 57 | 3 | 14 | 17 | 70 | — | — | — | — | — |
| 2015–16 | Rockford IceHogs | AHL | 37 | 2 | 3 | 5 | 30 | — | — | — | — | — |
| 2015–16 | Charlotte Checkers | AHL | 21 | 0 | 3 | 3 | 4 | — | — | — | — | — |
| 2016–17 | Charlotte Checkers | AHL | 65 | 6 | 10 | 16 | 52 | 5 | 1 | 2 | 3 | 6 |
| 2017–18 | Charlotte Checkers | AHL | 46 | 1 | 8 | 9 | 52 | 2 | 0 | 0 | 0 | 0 |
| 2018–19 | Charlotte Checkers | AHL | 49 | 5 | 5 | 10 | 36 | 7 | 0 | 2 | 2 | 16 |
| 2019–20 | HC Bolzano | EBEL | 48 | 5 | 15 | 20 | 46 | 3 | 0 | 0 | 0 | 2 |
| 2020–21 | HC Bolzano | ICEHL | 48 | 10 | 21 | 31 | 44 | 16 | 3 | 7 | 10 | 14 |
| 2021–22 | HC Dynamo Pardubice | ELH | 44 | 4 | 9 | 13 | 26 | — | — | — | — | — |
| 2022–23 | EC Red Bull Salzburg | ICEHL | 47 | 2 | 19 | 21 | 22 | 16 | 5 | 6 | 11 | 6 |
| 2023–24 | EC Red Bull Salzburg | ICEHL | 40 | 6 | 18 | 24 | 50 | 19 | 2 | 4 | 6 | 20 |
| AHL totals | | | 276 | 17 | 44 | 61 | 244 | 14 | 1 | 4 | 5 | 22 |

== Awards and honours ==
| Award | Year |
|---|---|
College
| All-ECAC Rookie Team | 2010–11 |
| ECAC Hockey All-Tournament Team | 2013 |
| All-Ivy League First Team | 2013–14 |
| All-ECAC Third Team | 2013–14 |
AHL
| Calder Cup (Charlotte Checkers) | 2019 |

Awards and achievements
| Preceded by Zach Davies | ECAC Hockey Best Defensive Defenseman; 2013–14 (with Shayne Gostisbehere) | Succeeded by Rob O'Gara |
