= Ryan Mulhern =

American ice hockey player

- Born: January 11, 1973 (age 53) Philadelphia, Pennsylvania, U.S.
- Height: 6 ft 1 in (185 cm)
- Weight: 203 lb (92 kg; 14 st 7 lb)
- Position: Centre
- Shot: Right
- Played for: Washington Capitals
- NHL draft: 174th overall, 1992; Calgary Flames
- Playing career: 1996–2000

Ryan Patrick Mulhern (born January 11, 1973) is an American former ice hockey player. He played 3 games in the National Hockey League with the Washington Capitals during the 1997–98 season. The rest of his career, which lasted from 1996 to 2000, was spent in the minor leagues.

== Biography ==
Mulhern grew up in Havertown, Pennsylvania. As a youth, he played in the 1985 and 1986 Quebec International Pee-Wee Hockey Tournaments with the Philadelphia Flyers minor ice hockey team.

Mulhern was named to the All-ECAC Hockey rookie team in the 1992–93 season. He was selected by the Calgary Flames in the 1992 NHL entry draft, and played briefly for the Washington Capitals.

== Career statistics ==
=== Regular season and playoffs ===
| | | | Regular season | | | | | Playoffs |
| Season | Team | League | GP | G | A | Pts | PIM | GP | G | A | Pts | PIM |
|---|---|---|---|---|---|---|---|---|---|---|---|---|
| 1990–91 | St. George's School | HS-RI | 25 | 40 | 41 | 81 | — | — | — | — | — | — |
| 1991–92 | Canterbury School | HS-CT | 37 | 51 | 27 | 78 | 50 | — | — | — | — | — |
| 1992–93 | Brown University | ECAC | 31 | 15 | 9 | 24 | 46 | — | — | — | — | — |
| 1993–94 | Brown University | ECAC | 27 | 18 | 17 | 35 | 48 | — | — | — | — | — |
| 1994–95 | Brown University | ECAC | 30 | 18 | 16 | 34 | 108 | — | — | — | — | — |
| 1995–96 | Brown University | ECAC | 32 | 10 | 15 | 25 | 78 | — | — | — | — | — |
| 1996–97 | Portland Pirates | AHL | 38 | 19 | 15 | 34 | 16 | 5 | 1 | 1 | 2 | 2 |
| 1996–97 | Hampton Roads Admirals | ECHL | 40 | 22 | 16 | 38 | 52 | — | — | — | — | — |
| 1997–98 | Washington Capitals | NHL | 3 | 0 | 0 | 0 | 0 | — | — | — | — | — |
| 1997–98 | Portland Pirates | AHL | 71 | 25 | 40 | 65 | 85 | 6 | 1 | 0 | 1 | 12 |
| 1998–99 | Kansas City Blades | IHL | 59 | 7 | 11 | 18 | 82 | — | — | — | — | — |
| 1998–99 | Las Vegas Thunder | IHL | 23 | 9 | 6 | 15 | 8 | — | — | — | — | — |
| 1999–00 | Portland Pirates | AHL | 73 | 20 | 16 | 36 | 61 | 3 | 0 | 0 | 0 | 6 |
| AHL totals | | | 382 | 64 | 71 | 135 | 162 | 14 | 2 | 1 | 3 | 20 |
| NHL totals | | | 3 | 0 | 0 | 0 | 0 | — | — | — | — | — |
