= Matt Lorito =

Canadian ice hockey player (born 1990)

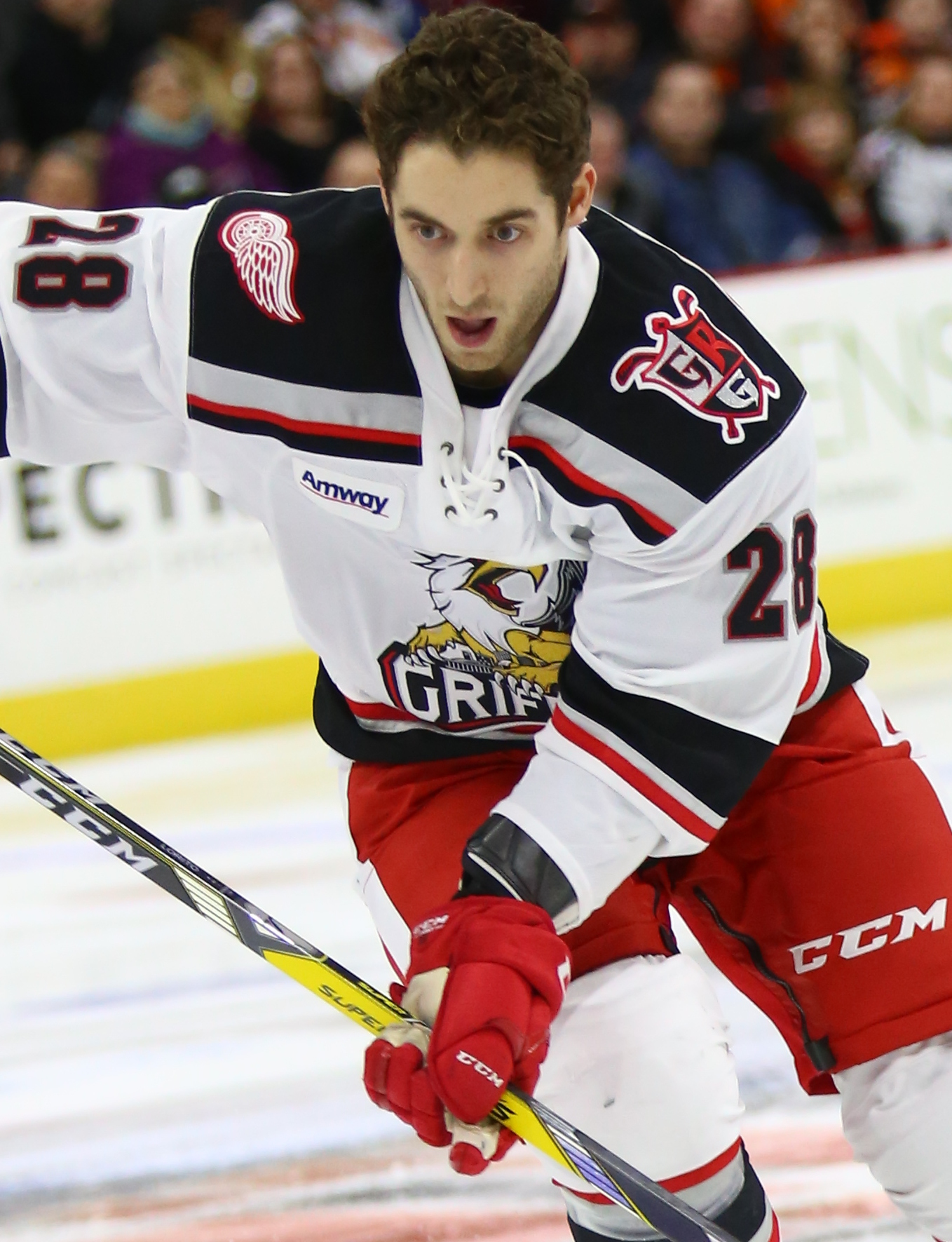
- Lorito with the Grand Rapids Griffins in 2017
- Born: July 3, 1990 (age 36) Oakville, Ontario, Canada
- Height: 5 ft 9 in (175 cm)
- Weight: 171 lb (78 kg; 12 st 3 lb)
- Position: Left wing
- Shot: Left
- Played for: Detroit Red Wings; Djurgårdens IF; Dinamo Riga; Grizzlys Wolfsburg
- NHL draft: Undrafted
- Playing career: 2015–2023

Matt Lorito (born July 3, 1990) is a Canadian former professional ice hockey winger who played in the National Hockey League (NHL) with the Detroit Red Wings.

== Playing career ==
=== College ===
Lorito began his collegiate career for the Brown University Brown Bears during the 2011–12 season. During his freshman season, he played in 24 games, missing the first eight games of the season due to injury, where he recorded four goals and 13 assists. He was Named ECAC Rookie of the Week for his performances against Princeton and Quinnipiac.

During the 2012–13 season in his sophomore season, Lorito recorded 22 goals and 15 assists in 36 games. Lorito was named to the Second Team All-ECAC team for his outstanding performance during the season. He finished the season as the Bears' leading scorer with 37 points, while also leading the team with eight power play goals, three game-winning goals, and sharing the lead with one short-handed goal. He Ranked sixth overall in the ECAC in scoring. During the 2013 ECAC Hockey Men's Ice Hockey Tournament, Lorito was the team's leading scorer recording seven goals and two assists, including a six-game goal scoring streak. Lorito helped the Bears advance to the ECAC Championship for the first time since 1993. Following an outstanding tournament, Lorito was named to the ECAC Hockey All-Tournament Team.

During the 2013–14 season in his junior season, Lorito served as assistant captain, and recorded 10 goals and 19 assists, He finished third on the team in scoring with 29 points, tied for the lead with 19 assists, and tied for the team lead in short handed goals. During the 2014–15 season in his senior season, Lorito served as captain, and recorded 11 goals and 12 assists, and tied for the team lead in scoring with 23 points. With two assists in a game against Princeton on February 20, 2015, Lorito became the 24th member of the Brown Bears 100-point club.

=== Professional ===
On March 13, 2015, the Albany Devils signed Lorito to an amateur tryout. Following his collegiate career, Lorito joined the Devils during the 2014–15 season, where he recorded three goals and nine assists in 11 games. During the 2015–16 season, in his first full professional season, Lorito led the Devils in scoring with 18 goals and 36 assists in 71 games. Among American Hockey League (AHL) rookies, he ranked sixth in points, tied for fourth in assists, tied for third in power play assists (19) and third in power play points (24). He tied for third on the team in playoff scoring with three goals and four assists in 11 games.

On July 1, 2016, the Detroit Red Wings signed Lorito to a two-year, two-way contract. On April 7, 2017, Lorito was recalled by the Red Wings. Prior to being recalled, Lorito recorded 21 goals and 33 assists in 59 games for the Grand Rapids Griffins, tied for the team lead with 54 points, and tied for 16th in the league in scoring. He also ranks among club leaders with 21 goals (3rd), 33 assists (1st) and 131 shots on goal (T5th). He made his NHL debut for the Red Wings the next day in a game against the Montreal Canadiens. Following the conclusion of the Red Wings season, Lorito was assigned to the Griffins. In two games with the Red Wings, he recorded one assist with six shots on goal in 14:26 average time on ice.

On January 4, 2018, Lorito, and teammate Matt Puempel, were the only two Grand Rapids players selected to play in the 2018 AHL All-Star Classic game.

On July 2, 2018, having left the Red Wings as a free agent, Lorito agreed to a two-year contract in which the second year would be on a one-way basis with the New York Islanders.

Lorito remained with the Islanders' AHL affiliate, the Bridgeport Sound Tigers through the duration of his contract. In his final year under contract in the during the 2019–20 season, Lorito registered 23 points in 50 games before he was traded by the Islanders at the NHL trade deadline to the Toronto Maple Leafs in exchange for Jordan Schmaltz on February 24, 2020.

As a free agent from the Maple Leafs heading into the pandemic delayed 2020-21 season, Lorito agreed to continue his career in the AHL, signing a one-year contract with the San Diego Gulls, affiliate to the Anaheim Ducks, on January 29, 2021.

Following his seventh season in the AHL, Lorito left North America as a free agent and signed his first European contract in agreeing to a one-year deal with Swedish club, Djurgårdens IF of the SHL, on August 21, 2021. After only 14 regular season games played, Lorito's contract with Djurgården was terminated. On November 10, 2021, Lorito opted to move to Kontinental Hockey League, signing as a free agent with Latvian club, Dinamo Riga, for the remainder of the season. Lorito made 17 appearances with Dinamo, collecting 3 goals and 7 points as the club finished outside of the playoffs. As a free agent, on February 4, 2022, Lorito opted to return to North America and signed an AHL contract for the remainder of the 2021–22 season with the Hartford Wolf Pack, the primary affiliate to the New York Rangers.

As an un-signed free agent over the summer, Lorito was belatedly signed to a one-year contract for the 2022–23 season with German club, Grizzlys Wolfsburg of the Deutsche Eishockey Liga (DEL), on December 22, 2022.

Lorito ended his 8 year professional playing career following his lone season in Germany. On August 30, 2023, he was hired as a professional scout to the Pittsburgh Penguins organization of the NHL.

== Career statistics ==
			Regular season					Playoffs
Season	Team	League	GP	G	A	Pts	PIM	GP	G	A	Pts	PIM
2008–09	St. Catharines Falcons	GOJHL	47	14	20	34	20	11	2	1	3	14
2009–10	Villanova Knights	OJAHL	56	32	46	78	20	6	2	9	11	0
2010–11	Villanova Knights	OJHL	41	28	54	82	16	10	6	6	12	2
2011–12	Brown University	ECAC	24	4	13	17	18	—	—	—	—	—
2012–13	Brown University	ECAC	36	22	15	37	6	—	—	—	—	—
2013–14	Brown University	ECAC	29	10	19	29	8	—	—	—	—	—
2014–15	Brown University	ECAC	29	11	12	23	8	—	—	—	—	—
2014–15	Albany Devils	AHL	11	3	9	12	2	—	—	—	—	—
2015–16	Albany Devils	AHL	71	18	36	54	26	11	3	4	7	4
2016–17	Grand Rapids Griffins	AHL	61	22	34	56	25	19	7	6	13	4
2016–17	Detroit Red Wings	NHL	2	0	1	1	0	—	—	—	—	—
2017–18	Grand Rapids Griffins	AHL	59	23	26	49	28	—	—	—	—	—
2018–19	Bridgeport Sound Tigers	AHL	23	5	11	16	12	5	2	2	4	2
2019–20	Bridgeport Sound Tigers	AHL	50	9	14	23	16	—	—	—	—	—
2019–20	Toronto Marlies	AHL	8	0	5	5	6	—	—	—	—	—
2020–21	San Diego Gulls	AHL	27	6	5	11	14	—	—	—	—	—
2021–22	Djurgårdens IF	SHL	14	2	4	6	8	—	—	—	—	—
2021–22	Dinamo Riga	KHL	17	3	4	7	10	—	—	—	—	—
2021–22	Hartford Wolf Pack	AHL	30	8	10	18	10	—	—	—	—	—
2022–23	Grizzlys Wolfsburg	DEL	18	2	3	5	10	10	2	1	3	6
NHL totals			2	0	1	1	0	—	—	—	—	—

== Awards and honours ==
Award	Year
College
ECAC Second All-Star Team	2013
ECAC All-Tournament Team	2013
All-Ivy First Team	2013
All-Ivy Second Team	2014, 2015
AHL
Calder Cup (Grand Rapids Griffins)	2017
All-Star Game	2017, 2018
