= Chris Harvey (ice hockey) =

American ice hockey player

- Born: December 8, 1967 (age 57); Cambridge, Massachusetts, U.S.
- Height: 6 ft 2 in (188 cm)
- Weight: 190 lb (86 kg; 13 st 8 lb)
- Position: Goaltender
- Caught: Left
- Played for: Brown; Maine Mariners; Johnstown Chiefs; Nashville Knights; Raleigh IceCaps; Erie Panthers; Brantford Smoke
- NHL draft: 1988 NHL Supplemental Draft; Boston Bruins
- Playing career: 1986–1994

Christopher T. Harvey (born December 8, 1967) is an American former professional ice hockey goaltender who was an All-American for Brown.

== Career ==
Harvey was a four-year starter for Brown, twice being named team MVP. after his first MVP honor, he was selected by the Boston Bruins in the NHL Supplemental Draft, being 21 years old at the time. Brown went through a dreadful season while Harvey was a junior, with the team winning just one game. Both he and the team rebounded in 1990 and Harvey was named as an All-American for the vast improvement.

After graduating, Harvey began his professional career. He spent the bulk of his time in the ECHL and retired as a player in 1994.

Harvey was inducted into the Brown Athletic Hall of Fame in 1997.

== Statistics ==
=== Regular season and playoffs ===
			Regular season									Playoffs
Season	Team	League	GP	W	L	T	MIN	GA	SO	GAA	SV%	GP	W	L	MIN	GA	SO	GAA	SV%
1985–86	St. Marys Lincolns	WOHL	—	—	—	—	—	—	—	—	—	—	—	—	—	—	—	—	—
1986–87	Brown	ECAC Hockey	22	—	—	—	1239	88	0	4.26	.885	—	—	—	—	—	—	—	—
1987–88	Brown	ECAC Hockey	22	—	—	—	1236	104	0	5.05	.887	—	—	—	—	—	—	—	—
1988–89	Brown	ECAC Hockey	23	1	22	0	1327	131	0	5.92	.849	—	—	—	—	—	—	—	—
1989–90	Brown	ECAC Hockey	28	10	15	3	1646	107	1	3.90	.904	—	—	—	—	—	—	—	—
1990–91	Maine Mariners	AHL	3	1	1	0	149	8	0	3.22	.908	—	—	—	—	—	—	—	—
1990–91	Johnstown Chiefs	ECHL	31	11	13	2	1606	113	1	4.22	.897	2	—	—	—	—	—	—	—
1991–92	Johnstown Chiefs	ECHL	4	2	2	0	193	12	0	4.04	.878	—	—	—	—	—	—	—	—
1991–92	Nashville Knights	ECHL	20	5	6	2	956	68	0	4.27	.901	—	—	—	—	—	—	—	—
1991–92	Raleigh IceCaps	ECHL	5	3	2	0	305	24	0	4.72	.873	4	—	—	—	—	—	—	—
1992–93	Erie Panthers	ECHL	2	0	1	0	67	13	0	11.64	.594	—	—	—	—	—	—	—	—
1993–94	Brantford Smoke	CoHL	4	1	0	1	170	16	0	5.63	.857	—	—	—	—	—	—	—	—
NCAA totals			95	—	—	—	5448	430	1	4.74	.883	—	—	—	—	—	—	—	—
ECHL totals			62	21	24	4	3127	230	1	4.41	.891	6	—	—	—	—	—	—	—

== Awards and honors ==
Award	Year
All-ECAC Hockey Second Team	1989–90
AHCA East Second-Team All-American	1989–90
