= Brown Bears men's ice hockey =

Brown University ice hockey program

- Current season
- University: Brown University
- Conference: ECAC Hockey
- First season: 1897–98; 129 years ago
- Head coach: Brendan Whittet; 16th season, 145–275–59 (.364)
- Assistant coaches: Jason Smith; Matt Plante; Ed Kesell
- Arena: Meehan Auditorium; Providence, Rhode Island
- Colors: Seal brown, cardinal red, and white

NCAA tournament runner-up
- 1951

NCAA tournament Frozen Four
- 1951, 1965, 1976

NCAA tournament appearances
- 1951, 1965, 1976, 1993

Conference regular season champions
- IHA: 1898, 1901; Pentagonal League: 1950, 1951

Current uniform

The Brown Bears men's ice hockey team is a National Collegiate Athletic Association (NCAA) Division I college ice hockey program that represents Brown University. The Bears are a member of ECAC Hockey. They play at the Meehan Auditorium in Providence, Rhode Island.

== History ==
Brown's first hockey team

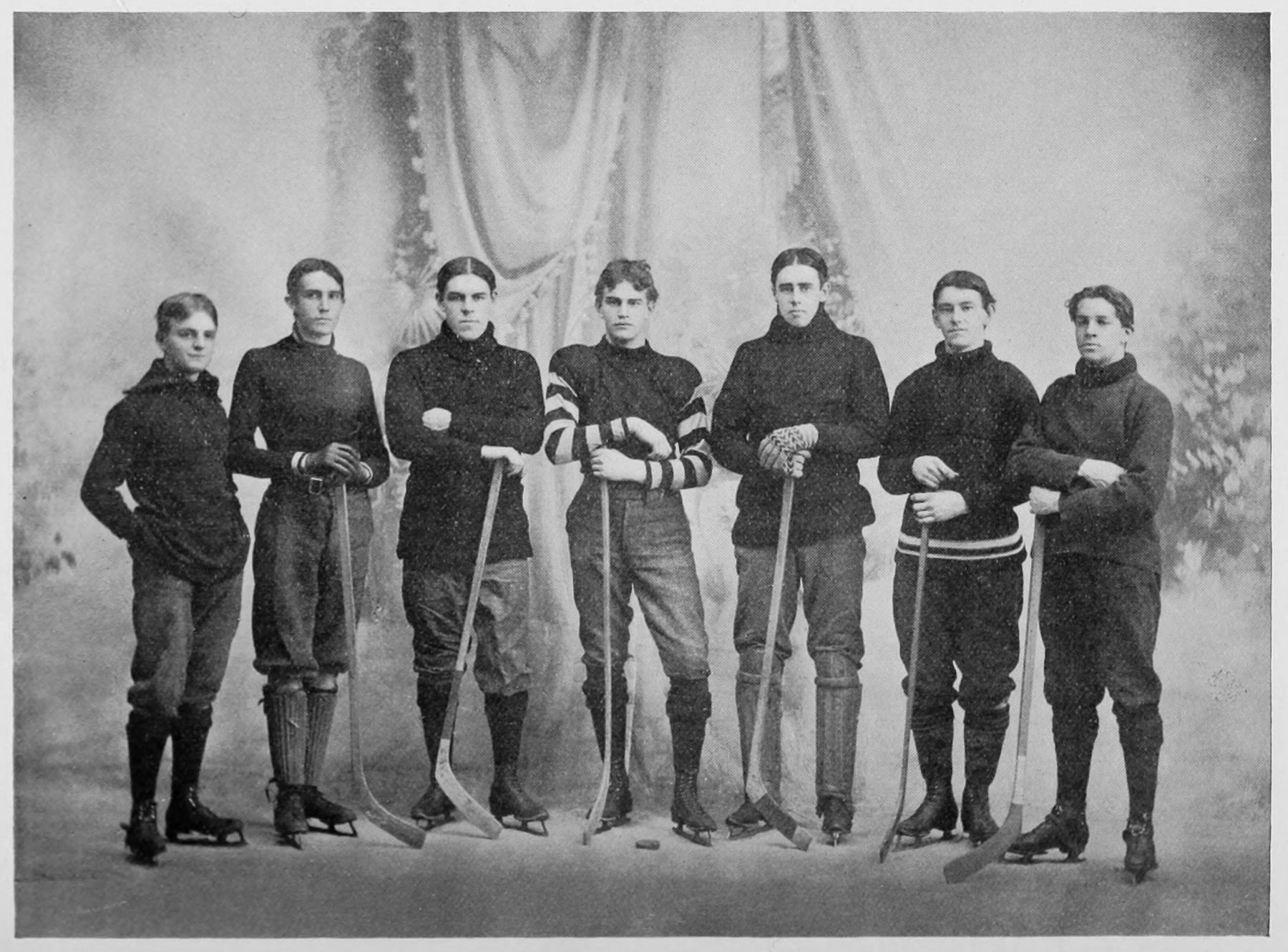
First Brown University hockey team in 1897–98. From left: Robert Steere, Harris Bucklin, Jesse Pevear, Irving Hunt, Albert Barrows, Charles Cooke, Horace Day.

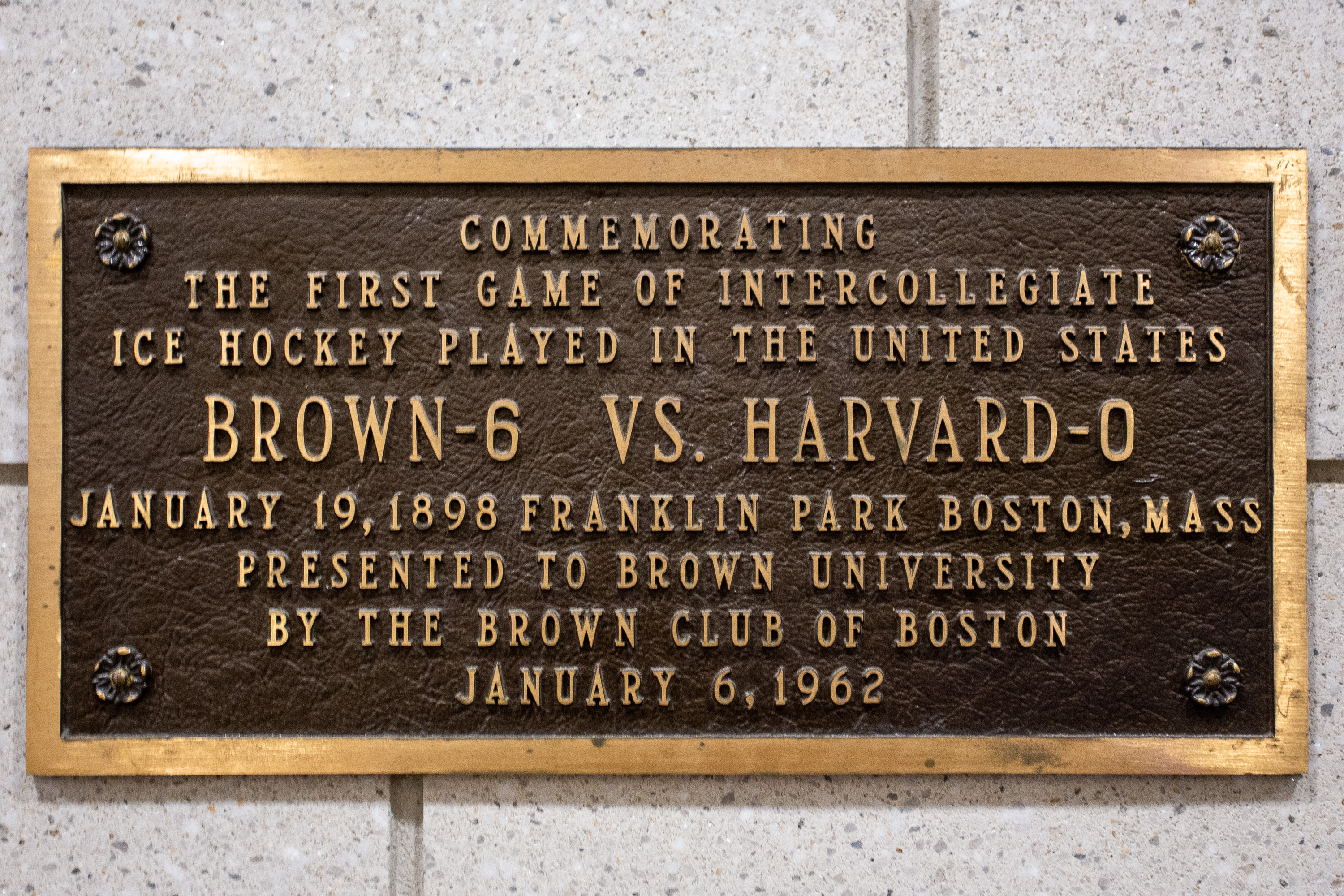
Plaque in Meehan Auditorium honors the first game

The men's ice hockey team at Brown is one of the country's oldest programs, having played their first game in 1898. That season, the team helped to form the first informal conference, the Intercollegiate Hockey Association, and wound up winning the league championship. While there was no formal declaration at the time, Brown's title is sometimes referred to as the first ice hockey national championship. Brown nearly repeated the feat three years later but ultimately fell to Yale in the first two playoff games ever contested for college ice hockey.

The program swiftly declined after that near miss and the Bears became one of the worst teams in the nation. By 1906 the team had lost 16 straight contests, failing to score a goal in 9 games during that stretch. The program suspended operations after 1906 and remained shuttered for 20 years. When they returned to the ice they debuted with their first official head coach. Though James Gardner only lasted one season behind the bench the team performed much better with a hand at the tiller and quickly built up to be a respected program. In 1939 the team again suspended operations, though this time it was due to the onset of World War II. Brown's team remained out of commission for the entire duration of the war and didn't return until several years after its conclusion, finally hitting the ice again in 1947.

In only 4 years the team climbed all the way to 17–5 record, receiving the top eastern seed for the 1951 NCAA tournament. Though they ultimately fell in the title game, Brown had become one of the better teams in college hockey and, excluding a brief period in the early '60s, would remain so for the next 30 years. When the 1980s rolled around the Bears results started turning sour and Brown found itself looking up at the rest of college hockey. Since 1981 Brown has produced only six winning seasons and more than half of their campaigns have ended with single-digit win totals. The Bears had a brief resurgence in the mid-1990s, managing to make the tournament in 1993 but bowed out after only 1 game.

== All-time coaching records ==
Tom Upton

As of the completion of 2025–26 season

Tenure	Coach	Years	Record	Pct.
1897–1906	No coach	10	16–39–3	.302
1926–27	Jimmy Gardner	1	4–4–0	.500
1927–29	Jean Dubuc	2	12–13–0	.480
1929–31, 1933–38	Thomas W. Taylor	7	50–32–1	.608
1931–33	Robert Taylor	2	11–12–1	.479
1938–39	Art Lesieur	1	6–7–0	.462
1947–52	Westcott Moulton	5	54–38–1	.586
1952–55	Donald Whiston	3	27–27–1	.500
1955–70	James Fullerton	15	176–168–9	.511
1970–74	J. Allan Soares	4	44–47–1	.484
1974–78	Richard Toomey	4	68–41–2	.622
1978–82	Paul Schilling	4	34–66–3	.345
1982–88	Herb Hammond	6	36–114–3	.245
1988–97	Bob Gaudet	9	93–142–31	.408
1997–2009	Roger Grillo	12	120–205–52	.387
2009–2026	Brendan Whittet	15	150–299–61	.354
2026	Tom Upton	1	0-5-0	.000
Totals	15 coaches	98 seasons	896–1,230–166	.427

== Brown Olympians ==
Brown has sent five members of its team to the Olympics. Three former players, Donald Whiston (Silver, 1952), Robert Gaudreau (1968) and Mike Mastrullo (1984 and 1992) represented their respective nations as players, former player Tim Bothwell was an assistant coach on the gold medal-winning 2006 Canadian women's team and former assistant coach Jack Ferreira was an assistant GM for the US men's team in 1998.

== Awards and honors ==
=== US Hockey Hall of Fame ===
- James Fullerton (1992)

=== NCAA ===
==== Individual awards ====
Spencer Penrose Award

- James Fullerton: 1965

Derek Hines Unsung Hero Award

- Jordan Pietrus: 2010
- Bobby Farnham: 2012

NCAA Tournament Most Outstanding Player

- Donald Whiston: 1951

==== All-Americans ====
First Team

- 1950–51: Donald Whiston, G
- 1951–52: Bob Wheeler, F
- 1964–65: Robert Gaudreau, D
- 1965–66: Robert Gaudreau, D
- 1967–68: Wayne Small, F
- 1969–70: Curt Bennett, F
- 1972–73: Keith Smith, D
- 1974–75: Bill Gilligan, F
- 1977–78: Mike Laycock, G
- 1979–80: Mark Holden, G
- 1991–92: Mike Brewer, D
- 2003–04: Yann Danis, G

Second Team

- 1989–90: Chris Harvey, G
- 2001–02: Yann Danis, G

=== ECAC Hockey ===
==== Individual awards ====
ECAC Hockey Player of the Year

- Wayne Small: 1967–68
- Yann Danis: 2003–04

ECAC Hockey Rookie of the Year

- Geoff Finch: 1990–91
- Brian Ihnacak: 2003–04

Tim Taylor Award

- Bob Gaudet: 1994–95

ECAC Hockey Outstanding Defenseman

- Robert Gaudreau: 1965–66

ECAC Hockey Best Defensive Defenseman

- Mike Traggio: 1993–94, 1994–95
- Scott Ford: 2003–04
- Dennis Robertson: 2013–14

Ken Dryden Award

- Yann Danis: 2003–04

==== All-ECAC ====
First Team

- 1963–64: Leon Bryant, F
- 1964–65: Robert Gaudreau, D
- 1965–66: Robert Gaudreau, D
- 1966–67: Wayne Small, F
- 1967–68: Wayne Small, F
- 1969–70: Curt Bennett, F
- 1976–77: Tim Bothwell, D
- 1977–78: Mike Laycock, G
- 1989–90: Mike Brewer, D
- 1991–92: Mike Brewer, D
- 1993–94: Geoff Finch, G
- 1994–95: Mike Traggio, D
- 1997–98: Damian Prescott, F
- 2003–04: Yann Danis, G
- 2015–16: Nick Lappin, F

Second team

- 1962–63: Leon Bryant, F
- 1963–64: Robert Gaudreau, D; Terry Chapman, F
- 1964–65: Terry Chapman, F
- 1966–67: Dennis Macks, D
- 1968–69: Curt Bennett, F
- 1969–70: Don McGinnis, G
- 1972–73: Keith Smith, D
- 1975–76: Kevin McCabe, G; Bill Gilligan, F
- 1978–79: Mike Mastrullo, D
- 1989–90: Chris Harvey, G
- 1990–91: Mike Brewer, D
- 1991–92: Derek Chauvette, F
- 1992–93: Scott Hanley, F
- 1993–94: Chris Kaban, F
- 1997–98: Jimmy Andersson, D
- 2001–02: Yann Danis, G
- 2002–03: Yann Danis, G
- 2006–07: Sean Hurley, D; Jeff Prough, F
- 2007–08: Sean Hurley, D
- 2010–11: Jack Maclellan, F
- 2011–12: Jack Maclellan, F
- 2012–13: Matt Lorito, F

Third Team

- 2009–10: Aaron Volpatti, F
- 2012–13: Anthony Borelli, G
- 2013–14: Dennis Robertson, D
- 2016–17: Sam Lafferty, F
- 2022–23: Mathieu Caron, G

All-Rookie Team

- 1989–90: Mike Ross, F
- 1990–91: Geoff Finch, G
- 1991–92: Mike Traggio, D
- 1992–93: Ryan Mulhern, F
- 1994–95: Jimmy Andersson, D
- 2003–04: Brian Ihnacak, F
- 2004–05: Sean Hurley, D
- 2008–09: Jeff Buvinow, D
- 2010–11: Dennis Robertson, D
- 2015–16: Max Gottlieb, D; Tommy Marchin, F

== Brown Hall of Fame ==
The following is a list of Brown's men's ice hockey players who were elected into the Brown University Athletic Hall of Fame (graduating class in parentheses).

- Philip Lingham (1930)
- Westcott Moulton (1931)
- Alden Walls (1931)
- G. Edward Crane (1931)
- Jackson Skillings (1937)
- Foster Davis Jr. (1939)
- George Menard (1950)
- Warren Priestly (1951)
- Anthony Malo (1951)
- Donald Whiston (1951)
- James M Sutherland (Captain)& his entire team of 1950-51 runner up in 1951 NCAA Tournament
- John Gilbert Jr. (1952)
- Albert Gubbins (1952)
- Jake Murphy (1952)
- Donald Sennott (1952)
- Bob Wheeler (1952)
- Robert Borah (1955)
- Daniel Keefe (1955)
- S. Russell Kingman Jr. (1956)
- Peter Tutless (1956)
- F. Rodney Dashnaw (1958)
- Harry Batchelder Jr. (1958)
- David Kelley (1960)
- J. Allan Soares (1960)
- Donald Eccleston (1965)
- Leon Bryant (1965)
- Terry Chapman (1965)
- W. Bruce Darling (1966)
- David Ferguson (1966)
- Robert Gaudreau (1966)
- R. Dennis Macks (1967)
- Wayne Small (1968)
- James Fullerton (1968, honorary)
- Robert Devaney (1969)
- Donald McGinnis (1970)
- Curt Bennett (1970)
- Keith Smith (1974)
- Bill Gilligan (1977)
- Kevin McCabe (1977)
- Robert McIntosh (1977)
- Tim Bothwell (1978)
- James Bennett (1979)
- Mike Laycock (1979)
- Michael Mastrullo (1979)
- Mark Holden (1980)
- Christopher Harvey (1990)
- Steven King (1991)
- Michael Brewer (1992)
- Derek Chauvette (1993)
- Scott Hanley (1993)
- Mike Traggio (1995)
- Ryan Mulhern (1996)
- Yann Danis (2004)
- John Dunham (2011)

== Statistical leaders ==
=== Career points leaders ===
Player	Years	GP	G	A	PTS	PIM
Bill Gilligan	1974–77	81	68	112	180	
Bob McIntosh	1974–77	78	81	79	160	
Don Sennott	1949–52	64	66	93	159	
Bob Wheeler	1949–52	61	86	63	149	
Wayne Small	1965–68	73	68	76	144	
Curt Bennett	1967–70	71	50	85	135	
Derek Chauvette	1989–93	117	34	99	133	
Dennis Macks	1964–67	79	59	72	131	
Leon Bryant	1963–65	77	55	75	130	
Terry Chapman	1962–65	78	67	60	127	

=== Career goaltending leaders ===
GP = Games played; Min = Minutes played; GA = Goals against; SO = Shutouts; SV% = Save percentage; GAA = Goals against average

Minimum 10 games

Player	Years	GP	MIN	W	L	T	GA	SO	SV%	GAA
Anthony Borelli	2009–2013	35	1852	14	12	5	63	4	.935	2.04
Yann Danis	2000–2004	100	6013	43	43	12	220	13	.930	2.20
Adam D'Alba	2004–2006	54	3129	19	25	8	141	3	.917	2.70
Lou Reycroft	1969–1970							0	.896	2.85
Dave Ferguson	1963–1966						181	1	.901	2.86

Statistics current through the start of the 2022–23 season.

== Roster ==
As of July 30, 2024.

No.	Nat.	Player	Class	Pos	Height	Weight	DoB	Hometown	Previous team	NHL rights
1	(Canada)	Freddie Halyk	Junior	G	6' 5" (1.96 m)	210 lb (95 kg)	2003-08-27	Cochrane, Alberta	Denver (NCHC)	—
2	(Canada)	Tristan Zarsky	Sophomore	D	6' 3" (1.91 m)	209 lb (95 kg)	2003-01-09	Edmonton, Alberta	El Paso Rhinos (NAHL)	—
3	(Canada)	Alex Pineau (C)	Junior	D	6' 3" (1.91 m)	205 lb (93 kg)	2003-01-21	Thunder Bay, Ontario	Des Moines Buccaneers (USHL)	—
5	(United States)	Nick Traggio	Senior	D	6' 2" (1.88 m)	210 lb (95 kg)	2001-08-01	Sharon, Connecticut	Bonnyville Pontiacs (AJHL)	—
6	(United States)	Harry Meirowitz	Junior	D	6' 0" (1.83 m)	185 lb (84 kg)	2003-05-21	Old Westbury, New York	P.A.L. Junior Islanders (NCDC)	—
7	(Russia)	Ivan Zadvernyuk	Sophomore	F	6' 3" (1.91 m)	190 lb (86 kg)	2004-04-12	Moscow, Russia	Lone Star Brahmas (NAHL)	—
8	(Canada)	Ryan Shostak	Senior	F	6' 0" (1.83 m)	190 lb (86 kg)	2001-09-08	Calgary, Alberta	Vernon Vipers (BCHL)	—
9	(United States)	Ryan St. Louis (C)	Senior	F	5' 10" (1.78 m)	170 lb (77 kg)	2003-06-13	Old Greenwich, Connecticut	Dubuque Fighting Saints (USHL)	—
10	(United States)	Ashton Bynum	Freshman	D	6' 4" (1.93 m)	201 lb (91 kg)	2004-06-25	Tulsa, Oklahoma	Austin Bruins (NAHL)	—
11	(United States)	Trip Pendy	Freshman	F	6' 1" (1.85 m)	201 lb (91 kg)	2005-01-07	Far Hills, New Jersey	Coquitlam Express (BCHL)	—
12	(Canada)	Ben Poitras	Sophomore	F	5' 11" (1.8 m)	181 lb (82 kg)	2005-07-18	Montreal, Quebec	Northeastern (HEA)	—
13	(United States)	Michael Salandra	Sophomore	F	5' 10" (1.78 m)	187 lb (85 kg)	2003-06-13	Pleasantville, New York	Quinnipiac (ECAC)	—
14	(United States)	Brendan Tighe	Freshman	F	5' 11" (1.8 m)	187 lb (85 kg)	2006-08-14	Birmingham, Michigan	Madison Capitols (USHL)	—
15	(Canada)	Charlie Gollob	Sophomore	F	6' 2" (1.88 m)	201 lb (91 kg)	2004-02-10	Toronto, Ontario	Victoria Grizzlies (BCHL)	—
16	(United States)	Owen Dyer	Freshman	D	6' 3" (1.91 m)	225 lb (102 kg)	2004-05-07	Clarkston, Michigan	Des Moines Buccaneers (USHL)	—
17	(United States)	Mike Cataldo	Junior	F	6' 1" (1.85 m)	200 lb (91 kg)	2003-05-04	Norfolk, Massachusetts	Bonnyville Pontiacs (AJHL)	—
18	(United States)	Dean Bauchiero	Senior	F	6' 4" (1.93 m)	215 lb (98 kg)	2002-03-04	Southington, Connecticut	Wichita Falls Warriors (NAHL)	—
19	(United States)	Matthew Brille	Junior	F	5' 10" (1.78 m)	180 lb (82 kg)	2003-01-02	Bethesda, Maryland	Chippewa Steel (NAHL)	—
21	(United States)	Matthew Cataldo	Freshman	F	6' 0" (1.83 m)	205 lb (93 kg)	2005-05-19	Norfolk, Massachusetts	Penticton Vees (BCHL)	—
22	(Canada)	Ethan Mistry	Junior	D	5' 10" (1.78 m)	175 lb (79 kg)	2003-02-04	Toronto, Ontario	Nanaimo Clippers (BCHL)	—
23	(United States)	Matt Desiderio	Freshman	D	6' 3" (1.91 m)	209 lb (95 kg)	2005-08-16	North Caldwell, New Jersey	Dubuque Fighting Saints (USHL)	—
25	(United States)	Zackary Tonelli	Senior	F	5' 9" (1.75 m)	170 lb (77 kg)	2002-02-14	Greenwich, Connecticut	Vernon Vipers (BCHL)	—
26	(United States)	Leo Schwartz	Sophomore	F	6' 0" (1.83 m)	174 lb (79 kg)	2004-10-05	New York, New York	New Jersey Titans (NAHL)	—
27	(Canada)	Jack Hewitt	Sophomore	D	5' 11" (1.8 m)	176 lb (80 kg)	2003-07-01	Toronto, Ontario	P.A.L. Junior Islanders (NCDC)	—
28	(United States)	Tanner Hartman	Senior	F	6' 0" (1.83 m)	168 lb (76 kg)	2001-10-10	Chicago, Illinois	Hobart (NEHC)	—
29	(United States)	Andrew King	Sophomore	F	6' 0" (1.83 m)	165 lb (75 kg)	2003-04-28	Dubuque, Iowa	Dubuque Fighting Saints (USHL)	—
31	(United States)	Ryan Kazmouz	Junior	G	6' 0" (1.83 m)	170 lb (77 kg)	2003-08-30	Livonia, Michigan	Saint Sebastian's School (US-Prep)	—
35	(United States)	Tyler Shea	Senior	G	5' 11" (1.8 m)	170 lb (77 kg)	2001-08-03	Stevenson Ranch, California	Michigan (Big Ten)	—
55	(United States)	Brian Nicholas	Sophomore	F	6' 1" (1.85 m)	192 lb (87 kg)	2005-03-15	Scarsdale, New York	Sioux City Musketeers (USHL)	—

== Bears in the NHL ==
The following is a list of Brown's men's ice hockey alumni who played in the NHL/WHA. As of July 1, 2025.

= NHL All-Star team	= NHL All-Star	= NHL All-Star and NHL All-Star team

Player	Position	Team(s)	Years	Games	Stanley Cups
Curt Bennett	Center	STL, NYR, ATF	1970–1980	580	0
Tim Bothwell	Defenseman	NYR, STL, HFD	1978–1989	502	0
Yann Danis	Goaltender	MTL, NYI, NJD, EDM	2005–2016	55	0
Brian Eklund	Goaltender	TBL	2005–2006	1	0
Bobby Farnham	Right wing	PIT, NJD, MTL	2014–2017	67	0
Ryan Garbutt	Left wing	DAL, CHI, ANA	2011–2017	305	0
Garnet Hathaway	Right wing	CGY, WSH, BOS, PHI	2015–Present	606	0
Mark Holden	Goaltender	MTL, WPG	1981–1985	8	0
Steven King	Right wing	NYR, ANA	1992–1996	67	0
Neil Labatte	Defenseman	STL	1978–1982	26	0
Sam Lafferty	Right wing	PIT, CHI, TOR, VAN, BUF	2019–Present	349	0
Nick Lappin	Right wing	NJD	2016–2019	60	0
Matt Lorito	Left wing	DET	2016–2017	2	0
Ryan Mulhern	Right wing	WSH	1997–1998	3	0
Todd Simpson	Defenseman	CGY, FLA, PHO, ANA, OTT, CHI, MTL	1995–2006	580	0
Brian Stapleton	Right wing	WSH	1975–1976	1	0
Aaron Volpatti	Left wing	VAN, WSH	2010–2015	114	0
Max Willman	Center	PHI, NJD	2021–2024	68	0
Harry Zolnierczyk	Left wing	PHI, PIT, NYI, ANA, NSH	2011–2017	84	0

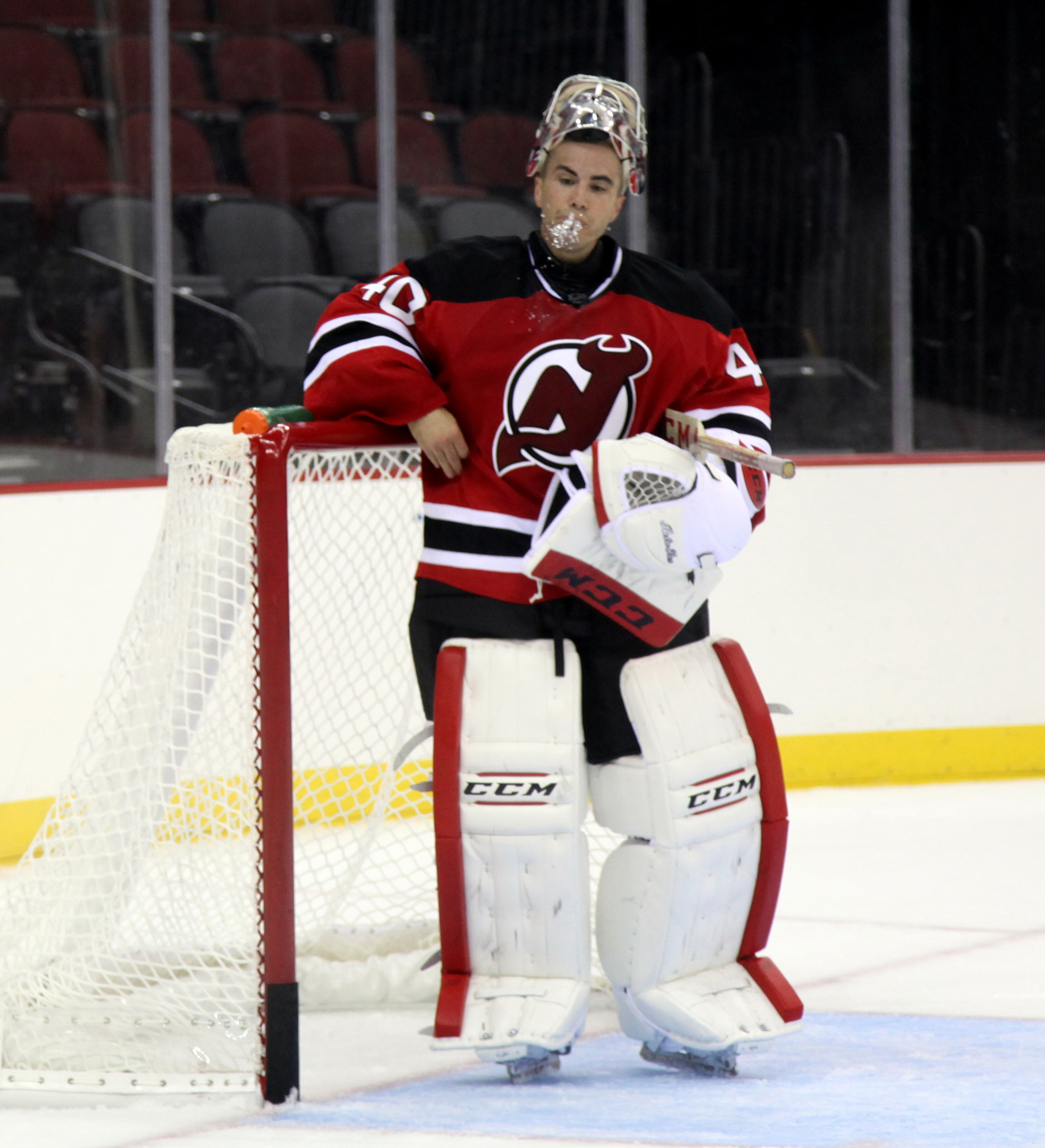
Yann Danis

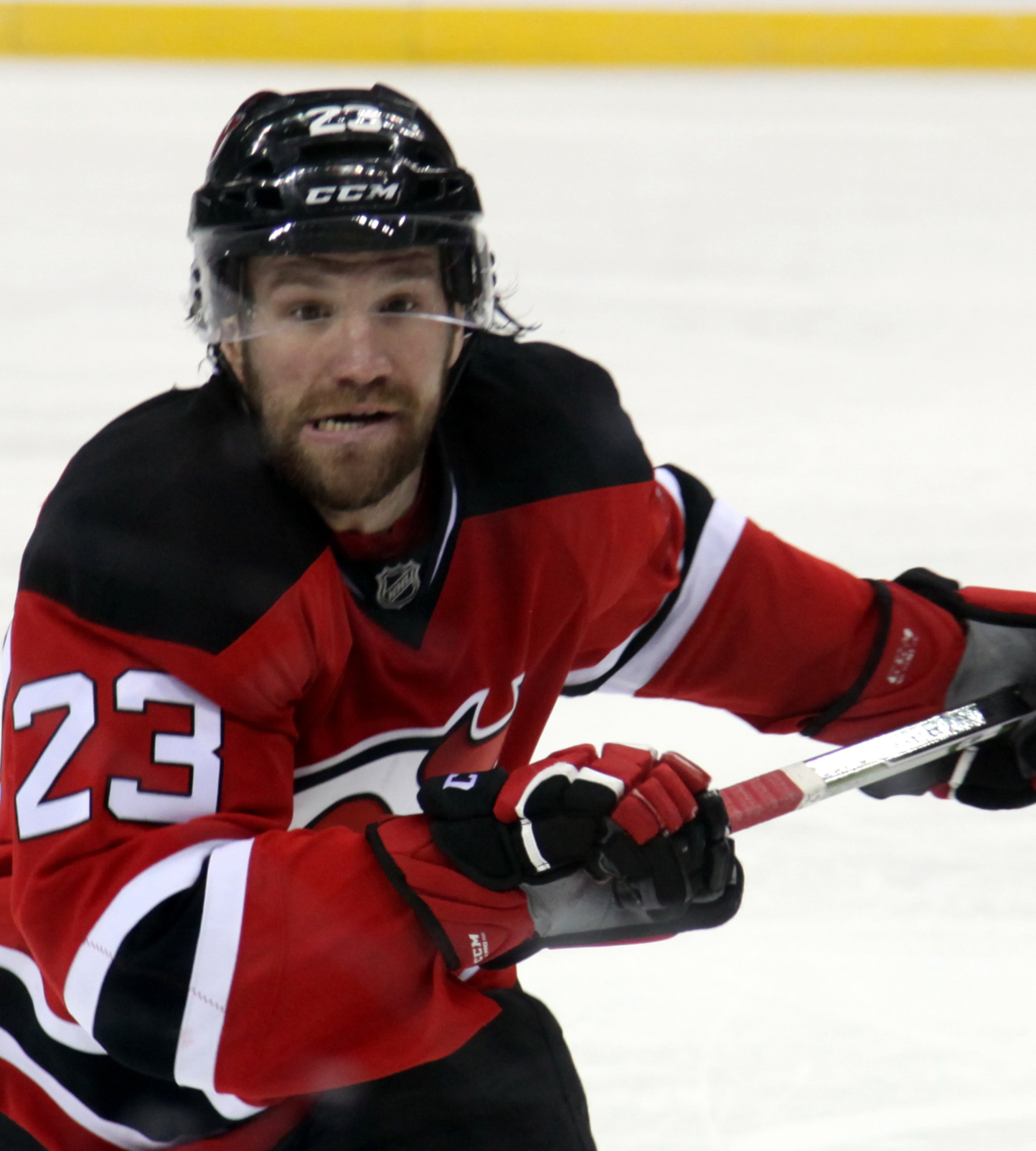
Bobby Farnham

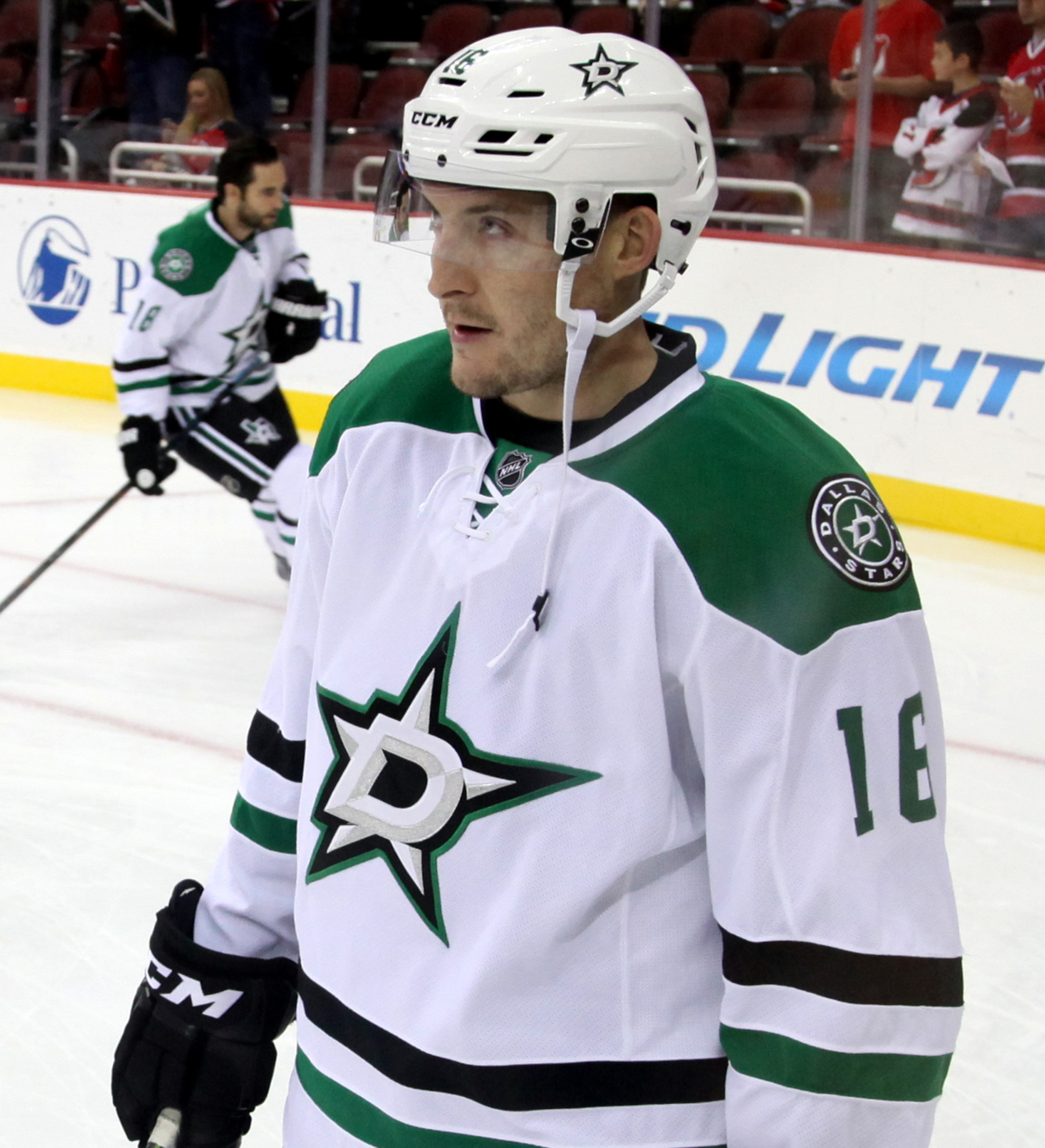
Ryan Garbutt

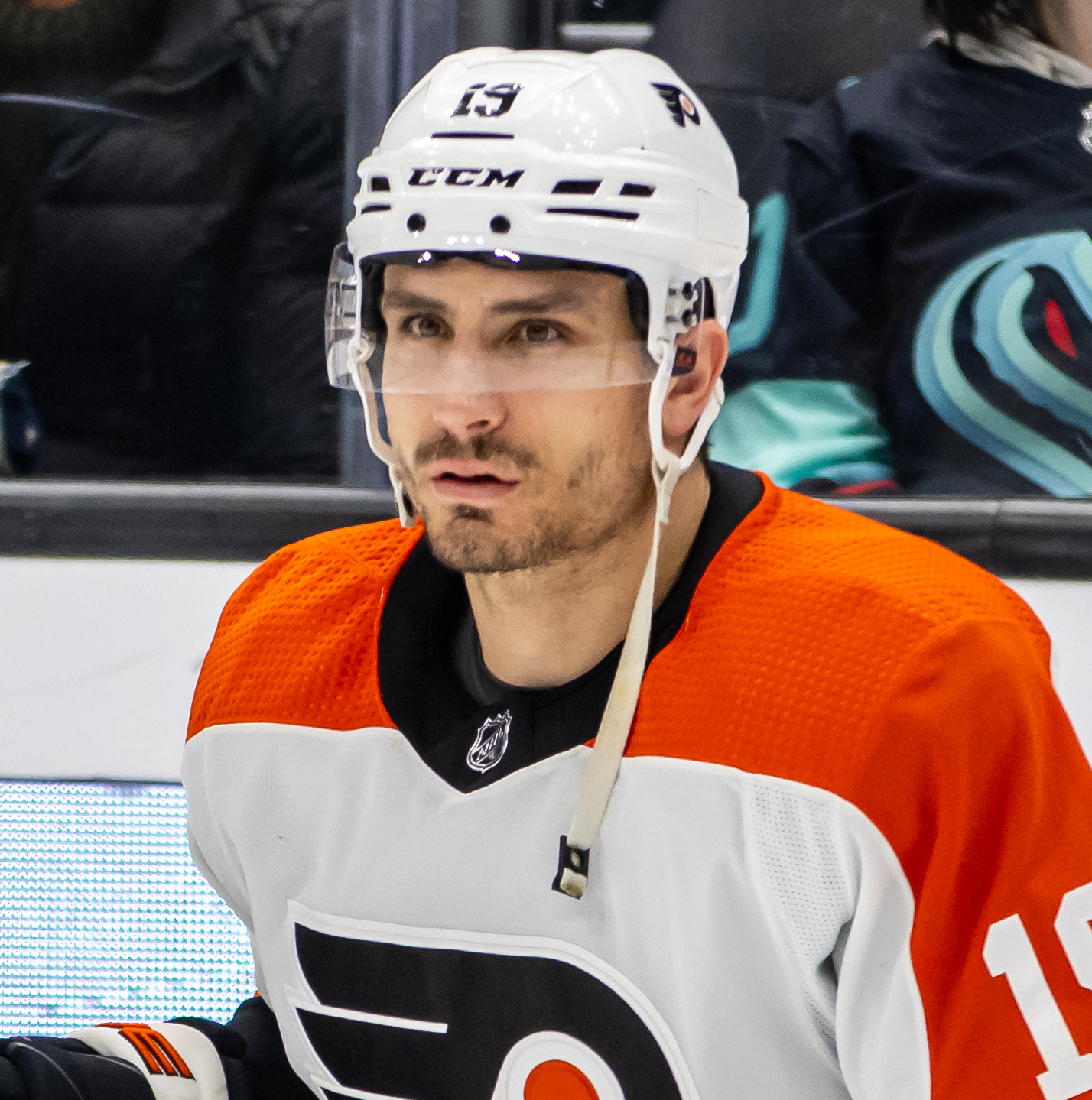
Garnet Hathaway

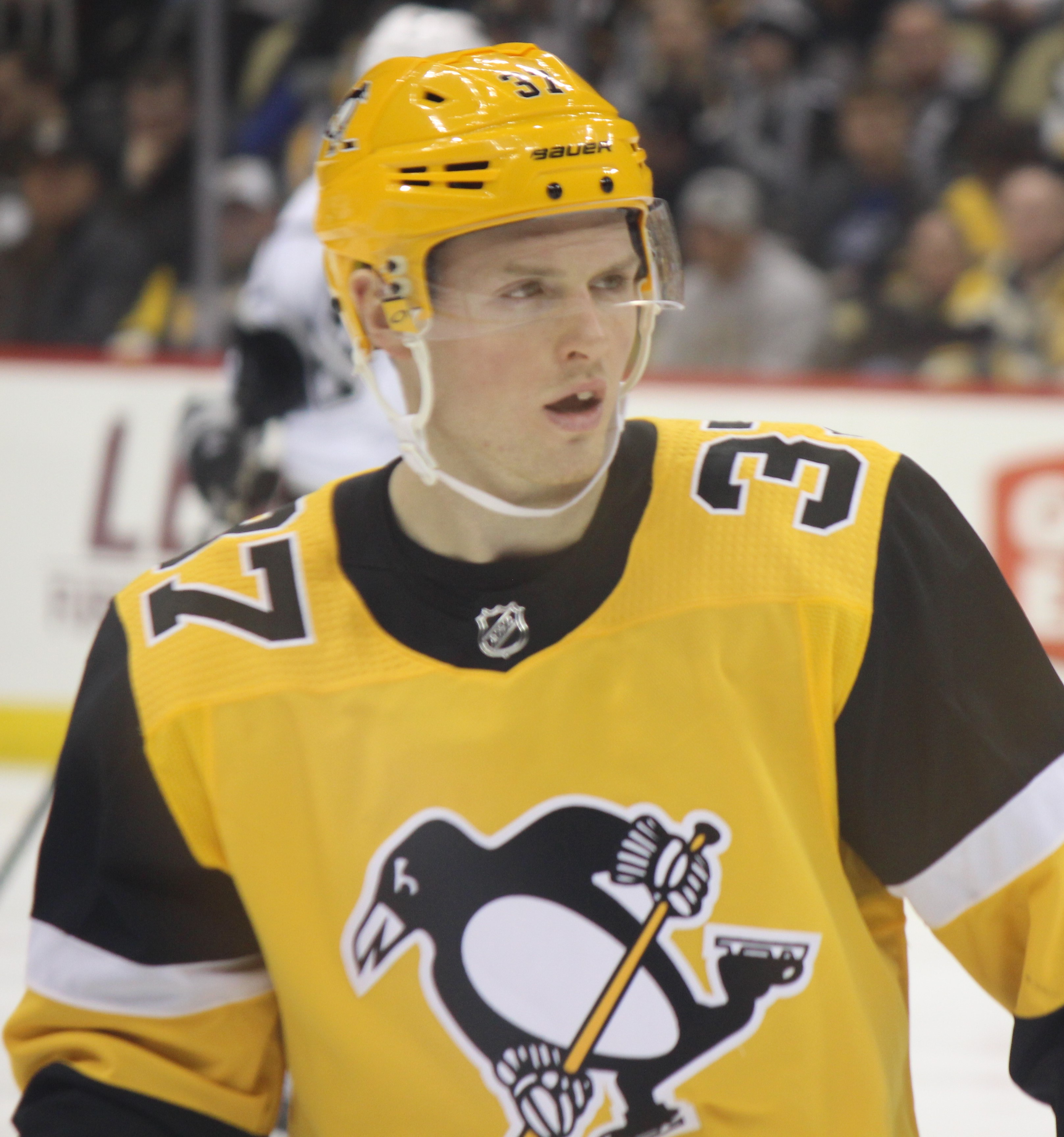
Sam Lafferty

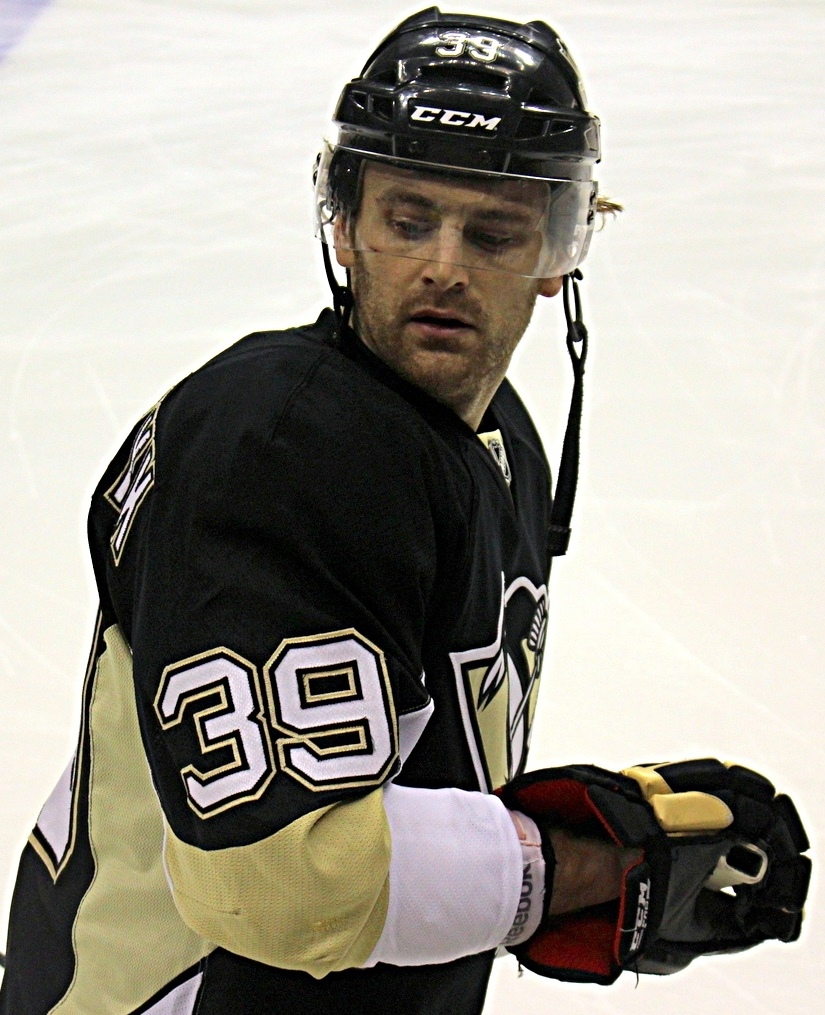
Harry Zolnierczyk

=== WHA ===
Several players also were members of WHA teams.

Player	Position	Team(s)	Years	Avco Cups
John Bennett	Wing	PHB	1972–1973	0
Bill Gilligan	Right wing	CIN	1977–1979	0
Dave Given	Forward	VCB	1974–1975	0

== See also ==
- Brown Bears women's ice hockey
- Brown Bears
