= Bob Taylor (ice hockey) =

American ice hockey player (1901–1993)

- Born: August 12, 1901 Brookline, Massachusetts, U.S.
- Died: December 12, 1993 (aged 92) Norwood, Massachusetts, U.S.
- Height: 6 ft 1 in (185 cm)
- Weight: 155 lb (70 kg; 11 st 1 lb)
- Position: Right wing
- Shot: Right
- Played for: Boston Bruins
- Playing career: 1945–1958

Robert Wallace Taylor (August 12, 1901 – December 12, 1993) was an American professional ice hockey right winger who played eight games for the Boston Bruins of the National Hockey League in 1930, scoring no points and receiving six penalty minutes.

Taylor played pro hockey between the 1926 and 1936 seasons, almost all of it in the Canadian–American Hockey League, principally for the Boston Tigers and the Providence Reds.

== Career statistics ==
=== Regular season and playoffs ===
			Regular season					Playoffs
Season	Team	League	GP	G	A	Pts	PIM	GP	G	A	Pts	PIM
1924–25	Boston Athletic Association	USAHA	5	2	0	2	4	—	—	—	—	—
1925–26	Boston Athletic Association	USAHA	4	2	0	2	—	2	0	0	0	0
1926–27	Boston Tigers	Can-Am	32	11	1	12	24	—	—	—	—	—
1927–28	Boston Tigers	Can-Am	40	8	2	10	30	2	0	0	0	2
1928–29	Boston Tigers	Can-Am	37	12	4	16	56	4	2	0	2	6
1939–30	Boston Bruins	NHL	6	0	0	0	4	—	—	—	—	—
1929–30	Philadelphia Arrows	Can-Am	34	11	3	14	46	2	0	0	0	8
1930–31	Boston Tigers	Can-Am	40	8	3	11	40	9	1	2	3	10
1931–32	Boston Cubs	Can-Am	1	0	0	0	2	—	—	—	—	—
1931–32	Providence Reds	Can-Am	37	6	5	11	20	5	1	2	3	0
1932–33	Providence Reds	Can-Am	45	10	4	14	12	2	0	0	0	0
1933–34	Providence Reds	Can-Am	39	3	7	10	0	3	2	1	3	0
1934–35	Providence Reds	Can-Am	38	2	5	7	0	2	0	0	0	0
1935–36	Providence Reds	Can-Am	2	0	0	0	4	—	—	—	—	—
Can-Am totals			345	71	34	105	234	29	6	5	11	26
NHL totals			6	0	0	0	4	—	—	—	—	—
