= James Fullerton (ice hockey) =

American ice hockey coach

Biographical details
- Born: April 9, 1909; Beverly, Massachusetts, USA
- Died: March 3, 1991 (aged 81)
- Education: Norwich University

Playing career
- 1926–1930: Norwich
- Position: Goaltender

Coaching career (HC unless noted)
- 1955–1970: Brown
- 1972–1977: New York Islanders (scout)
- 1977–1978: Chicago Blackhawks (scout)

Head coaching record
- Overall: 176-168-9 (.511)

Accomplishments and honors

Awards
- 1965 Spencer Penrose Award; 1971 US Collegiate Hockey Hall of Fame; 1974 Brown Athletic Hall of Fame; 1992 US Hockey Hall of Fame; 2019 Massachusetts Hockey Hall Of Fame; 2020 Rhode Island Hockey Hall Of Fame

Records
- Lowest winning percentage one season: (.000)

James Herd Fullerton (April 9, 1909 – March 3, 1991) was an American ice hockey coach and referee. In 1992 he was inducted into the United States Hockey Hall of Fame.

== Early years ==
Fullerton learned to play hockey at Beverly High School (class of '26) prior to attending Norwich University (class of '30) in Northfield, Vermont, where he lettered in both football and hockey with a 2.71 goals against average over four years. During his senior year, he doubled as captain and head coach of the hockey team.

After graduating, he passed on a tendered offer by Boston Bruins in order to accept a teaching/coaching position at Northwood School in Lake Placid, New York. Jim won an enviable 86% of his games with four undefeated seasons during his tenure from 1931 through 1955. He is credited with founding the first prep school invitational hockey tournament in the late 1930s. From the Olympic Village Fullerton officiated collegiate and professional games for 20 years while serving as AAU Ice Officials, VP New England Chapter.

== Brown University coach ==
In 1955 Brown University hired Fullerton as their first full-time hockey coach where he remained for 15 seasons, retiring in 1970. With just 2 ice rinks in Rhode Island and Brown having none, the challenge was great to be competitive and the 1960/'61 season closed with an 0–21 record. Meehan Auditorium opened in late 1961 and with the 1964/'65 team, Brown's and its coach's fortunes changed with a 21–9 record and slot in the Frozen Four tournament hosted by Brown. His overall Brown record was 184–168–9. Three players achieved All-America status while the coach was a four-time recipient of New England Coach of the Year and the National Collegiate Coach of The Year in 1965.

== Perfecting the game ==
Fullerton was considered an innovator with many crediting him with developing defensive plays such as the "Box", "Triangle" and one-two-one "Diamond" tactics. He had a game strategy for each opponent that kept his teams competitive even when short on depth and talent. Fullerton hired the first female assistant coach (Laura Stamm) to teach power skating and in 1964 had a Brown co-ed (Nancy Schieffelin) suit up and practice with the men. Nancy was an organizer for the Panda Bears, the first recognized American college women's hockey team (1965).

== Achievements after retirement ==
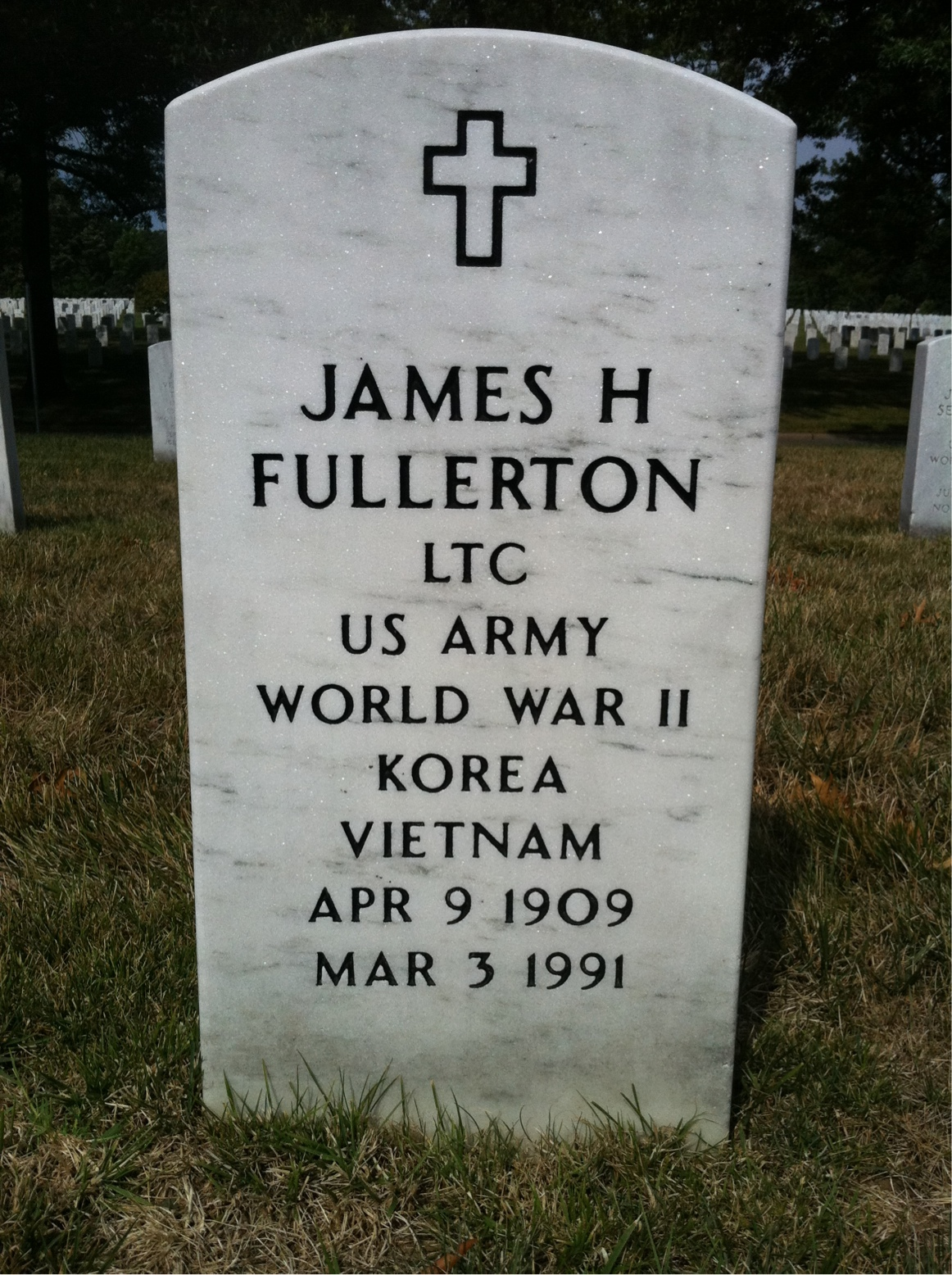
Grave at Arlington National Cemetery

Following retirement in 1970, Fullerton remained active with summer youth hockey camps, coaching US entry in the FIS World University Games (Lake Placid, NY). He also worked as a college scout for the New York Islanders (1972-'77) and the Chicago Black Hawks ('77-'78). In 1978, Hastings House Publishing Co. printed and marketed 8,000 copies of Fullerton's book Ice hockey: Playing and Coaching.

A driving force behind the American Hockey Coaches Association from his arrival at Brown, presiding over the organization in 1967-'69, Fullerton received the AHCA Founders Award in 1989 and the "Jim Fullerton Award" is presented annually to recognize an individual who loves the purity of the game. Both Brown ('74) and Norwich ('84) Athletic Halls of Fame have inducted Fullerton. In 1989 he received the Hobey Baker Legends of College Hockey Award, and Northwood School's Wall of Fame is in his recognition. The U.S. Hockey Hall of Fame honored Fullerton along with his good friends and peers, Len Ceglarski and Amo Bessone, as enshrinees in 1992. He was inducted into the Rhode Island Hockey Hall of Fame in 2020.

Fullerton died March 3, 1991. He is buried at Arlington National Cemetery in recognition of his more than 30 years of service as an active and reserve officer of the United States Army.

== Head coaching record ==
Record table
Season	Team	Overall	Conference	Standing	Postseason
Brown Bears Independent (1955–1961)
1955–56	Brown	10-9-0			
1956–57	Brown	6-14-0			
1957–58	Brown	11-10-2			
1958–59	Brown	10-14-0			
1959–60	Brown	13-13-0			
1960–61	Brown	0-20-0			
Brown:		50-80-2			
Brown Bears (ECAC Hockey) (1961–1970)
1961–62	Brown	7-17-0	7-17-0	24th	
1962–63	Brown	16-7-1	15-6-1	8th	ECAC Quarterfinals
1963–64	Brown	13-9-2	12-8-2	12th	
1964–65	Brown	21-9-0	16-6-0	4th	NCAA consolation game (loss)
1965–66	Brown	16-9-0	12-6-0	4th	ECAC third-place game (loss)
1966–67	Brown	13-11-0	8-8-0	8th	ECAC Quarterfinals
1967–68	Brown	15-7-2	12-6-2	6th	ECAC Quarterfinals
1968–69	Brown	10-11-1	10-9-1	8th	
1969–70	Brown	15-8-1	14-6-1	5th	ECAC Quarterfinals
Brown:		126-88-7	106-72-7		
Total:		176-168-9			
National champion Postseason invitational champion Conference regular season champion Conference regular season and conference tournament champion Division regular season champion Division regular season and conference tournament champion Conference tournament champion

Awards and achievements
Preceded by Tom Eccleston	Spencer Penrose Award; 1964–65	Succeeded by Amo Bessone/Len Ceglarski
Preceded by Fido Purpur	Hobey Baker Legends of College Hockey Award; 1989	Succeeded by Al Renfrew
