= 1951–52 Michigan Wolverines men's ice hockey season =

Sports season

National champion 1952 NCAA Tournament, champion
- Conference: T–2nd MCHL
- Home ice: Weinberg Coliseum

Record
- Overall: 22–4
- Home: 13–3
- Road: 7–1
- Neutral: 2–0

Coaches and captains
- Head coach: Vic Heyliger
- Captain: Earl Keyes

The 1951–52 Michigan Wolverines men's ice hockey team represented the University of Michigan in college ice hockey. In its eighth year under head coach Vic Heyliger, the team compiled a 22–4–0 record, outscored opponents 161 to 70, and won the 1952 NCAA Division I Men's Ice Hockey Tournament. The season was the second consecutive in which the Michigan hockey team won the NCAA championship.

== Individual accomplishments ==
Senior defenseman Bob Heathcott from Turner Valley, Alberta was Michigan's leading scorer during the 1951–52 season with 44 points on 13 goals and 31 assists. Six members of the team were selected as first-team All-Americans: forwards George Chin, Earl Keyes, John McKennell, and Doug Philpott, and defensemen Jim Haas and Reg Shave.

At the end of the season, the players selected goalie Willard Ikola from Eveleth, Minnesota, as the team's most valuable player. Ikola allowed an average of 2.75 goals per game in 24 regular season games. He allowed only four goals in the NCAA Tournament.

Junior center John Matchefts, also from Eveleth, Minnesota, was chosen as the captain of the 1952–53 team. Matchefts had been leading the 1951-52 team in scoring until being declared academically ineligible with eight games remaining in the regular season.

== Standings ==
1951–52 Midwest Collegiate Hockey League
| | Conference | | | | | | | Overall | | | | | |
| | GP | W | L | T | PTS | GF | GA | GP | W | L | T | GF | GA |
|---|---|---|---|---|---|---|---|---|---|---|---|---|---|
| Colorado College† | 12 | 10 | 2 | 0 | 20 | | | 25 | 19 | 5 | 1 | 168 | 94 |
| Denver | 12 | 9 | 3 | 0 | 18 | 66 | 40 | 25 | 18 | 6 | 1 | 146 | 94 |
| Michigan | 12 | 9 | 3 | 0 | 18 | 75 | 40 | 26 | 22 | 4 | 0 | 161 | 70 |
| North Dakota | 12 | 6 | 6 | 0 | 12 | 55 | 56 | 25 | 13 | 11 | 1 | 126 | 105 |
| Minnesota | 12 | 5 | 7 | 0 | 10 | | | 26 | 13 | 13 | 0 | 130 | 114 |
| Michigan State | 12 | 3 | 9 | 0 | 6 | | | 20 | 7 | 13 | 0 | 72 | 110 |
| Michigan Tech | 12 | 0 | 12 | 0 | 0 | | | 20 | 2 | 18 | 0 | 75 | 154 |
† indicates conference regular season champion Only the first two games played between member teams counted for conference standings.

=== Schedule ===
During the season Michigan compiled a 22–4 record, the fifthconsecutive year that the team won at least 80% of their games. This was the first season that Michigan played as a member of a conference. The teams in the MCHL played an unbalanced schedule against one another and to balance it evenly only the first two games against each member team were counted as part of the standings. Michigan finished tied for second with Denver but was selected over the Pioneers for the tournament due to a better overall record. Their schedule was as follows.

| Date | Opponent | Score | Result | Venue | Location | Record (MCHL) |
| Dec. 5, 1951 | Michigan State † | 11–1 | Win | Demonstration Hall | East Lansing, MI | 1–0 (1–0) |
| Dec. 7, 1951 | Montreal | 9–2 | Win | Weinberg Coliseum | Ann Arbor, MI | 2–0 (1–0) |
| Dec. 8, 1951 | Montreal | 4–5 | Win | Weinberg Coliseum | Ann Arbor, MI | 2–1 (1–0) |
| Dec. 14, 1951 | Toronto | 4–1 | Win | Weinberg Coliseum | Ann Arbor, MI | 3–1 (1–0) |
| Dec. 15, 1951 | Toronto | 6–4 | Win | Weinberg Coliseum | Ann Arbor, MI | 4–1 (1–0) |
| Dec. 20, 1951 | Denver † | 7–5 | Win | Weinberg Coliseum | Ann Arbor, MI | 5–1 (2–0) |
| Dec. 21, 1951 | Denver † | 4–5* | Loss | Weinberg Coliseum | Ann Arbor, MI | 5–2 (2–1) |
| Jan. 4, 1952 | North Dakota † | 4–2 | Win | Winter Sports Building | Grand Forks, ND | 6–2 (3–1) |
| Jan. 5, 1952 | North Dakota † | 2–4 | Loss | Winter Sports Building | Grand Forks, ND | 6–3 (3–2) |
| Jan. 11, 1952 | Minnesota † | 5–4 | Win | Weinberg Coliseum | Ann Arbor, MI | 7–3 (4–2) |
| Jan. 12, 1952 | Minnesota † | 6–1 | Win | Weinberg Coliseum | Ann Arbor, MI | 8–3 (5–2) |
| Jan. 16, 1952 | Michigan State † | 7–1 | Win | Weinberg Coliseum | Ann Arbor, MI | 9–3 (6–2) |
| Jan. 18, 1952 | Minnesota | 7–2 | Win | Williams Arena | Minneapolis, MN | 10–3 (6–2) |
| Jan. 19, 1952 | Minnesota | 5–0 | Win | Williams Arena | Minneapolis, MN | 11–3 (6–2) |
| Feb. 8, 1952 | Michigan Tech † | 9–2 | Win | Dee Stadium | Houghton, MI | 12–3 (7–2) |
| Feb. 9, 1952 | Michigan Tech † | 10–4 | Win | Dee Stadium | Houghton, MI | 13–3 (8–2) |
| Feb. 15, 1952 | Colorado College † | 3–5 | Loss | Weinberg Coliseum | Ann Arbor, MI | 13–4 (8–3) |
| Feb. 16, 1952 | Colorado College † | 7–6* | Win | Weinberg Coliseum | Ann Arbor, MI | 14–4 (9–3) |
| Feb. 22, 1952 | McGill | 6–0 | Win | Weinberg Coliseum | Ann Arbor, MI | 15–4 (9–3) |
| Feb. 23, 1952 | McGill | 3–1 | Win | Weinberg Coliseum | Ann Arbor, MI | 16–4 (9–3) |
| Feb. 29, 1952 | Michigan State | 8–2 | Win | Demonstration Hall | East Lansing, MI | 17–4 (9–3) |
| Mar. 1, 1952 | Michigan State | 6–2 | Win | Weinberg Coliseum | Ann Arbor, MI | 18–4 (9–3) |
| Mar. 9, 1952 | Michigan Tech | 11–4 | Win | Weinberg Coliseum | Ann Arbor, MI | 19–4 (9–3) |
| Mar. 10, 1952 | Michigan Tech | 4–3 | Win | Weinberg Coliseum | Ann Arbor, MI | 20–4 (9–3) |
NCAA TOURNAMENT
| March 13, 1952 | St. Lawrence | 9–3 | Win | Broadmoor World Arena | Colorado Springs, CO | 21–4 (9–3) |
| March 15, 1952 | Colorado College | 4–1 | Win | Broadmoor World Arena | Colorado Springs, CO | 22–4 (9–3) |
| | | 161–70 | | | | 22–4 (9–3) |

* Denotes overtime periods
† MCHL game

== Roster and scoring statistics ==
| No. | Name | Year | Position | Hometown | S/P/C | Games | Goals | Assists | Pts | PIM |
|---|---|---|---|---|---|---|---|---|---|---|
| 5 | Bob Heathcott | Senior | D | Calgary, AB | (Alberta) | 24 | 13 | 31 | 44 | 30 |
| 7 | Earl Keyes | Junior | C | Tiverton, ON | (Ontario) | 26 | 18 | 21 | 39 | 6 |
| 10 | John McKennell | Junior | RW | Toronto, ON | (Ontario) | 26 | 17 | 22 | 39 | 25 |
| 8 | Pat Cooney | Sophomore | LW | Riverside, ON | (Ontario) | 26 | 19 | 19 | 38 | 40 |
| 6 | George Chin | Sophomore | RW | Lucknow, ON | (Ontario) | 26 | 18 | 19 | 37 | 10 |
| 19 | Doug Mullen | Sophomore | C | Grass Lake, MI | (Michigan) | 26 | 18 | 17 | 35 | 20 |
| 12 | Doug Philpott | Sophomore | RW | Sarnia, ON | (Ontario) | 24 | 12 | 17 | 29 | 4 |
| 4 | John Matchefts | Junior | C | Eveleth, MN | (Minnesota) | 16 | 14 | 13 | 27 | 26 |
| 2 | Jim Haas | Senior | D | Nipawin, SK | (Saskatchewan) | 26 | 6 | 16 | 22 | 37 |
| 15 | Ron Martinson | Junior | LW | Eveleth, MN | (Minnesota) | 24 | 7 | 14 | 21 | 20 |
| 18 | Alex MacLellan | Junior | D | Montreal, PQ | (Quebec) | 26 | 6 | 9 | 15 | 61 |
| 9 | Paul Pelow | Senior | C | Toronto, ON | (Ontario) | 26 | 7 | 6 | 13 | 15 |
| 17 | Reg Shave | Sophomore | D | Yorkton, SK | (Saskatchewan) | 26 | 2 | 10 | 12 | 22 |
| 11 | Graham Cragg | Senior | D | Edmonton, AB | (Alberta) | 26 | 4 | 4 | 8 | 24 |
| 3 | Eddie May | Senior | D | Edmonton, AB | (Alberta) | 8 | 0 | 1 | 1 | 0 |
| | Telly Mascarin | Freshman | LW | Windsor, ON | (Ontario) | 3 | 0 | 0 | 0 | 2 |
| 1 | Bill Lucier | Freshman | G | Windsor, ON | (Ontario) | 4 | – | – | – | – |
| 1 | Willard Ikola | Sophomore | G | Eveleth, MN | (Minnesota) | 26 | – | – | – | – |
| 14 | Gordon Naylor | Senior | RW | Montreal, PQ | (Quebec) | – | – | – | – | – |
| | Bob Lotzer | | F | | | – | – | – | – | – |
| Total | | | | | | | 161 | | | |

Charles M. Hyman, a senior from Elyria, Ohio, won the manager's "M" for his work as the team's manager.

== Goaltending Statistics ==
| No. | Name | Games | Minutes | Wins | Losses | Ties | Goals Against | Saves | Shut Outs | SV % | GAA |
|---|---|---|---|---|---|---|---|---|---|---|---|
| 1 | Willard Ikola | 26 | – | 22 | 4 | 0 | 70 | – | 2 | – | 2.69 |
| 1 | Bill Lucier | – | – | – | – | – | – | – | – | – | – |
| Total | | 26 | – | 22 | 4 | 0 | 70 | – | 2 | – | 2.69 |

== 1952 national championship ==
In the 1952 tournament, Michigan and the Colorado College Tigers were invited from the west, and the St. Lawrence Saints and Yale Bulldogs were invited from the east. The Wolverines defeated the St. Lawrence Saints in the first round by a 9-3 score. Michigan scored five goals in the first period against the Saints. Defenseman Graham Cragg scored the first goal of the game, and he later scored the final goal in the championship game. John McKennell and Pat Cooney scored two goals each in the victory over St. Lawrence.

In the championship game, Michigan played the Colorado College Tigers. Michigan and Colorado College had developed an intense rivalry as each had been invited to play in the Frozen Four for five consecutive years. Michigan won the championship in 1948 and 1951, and Colorado College won the championship in 1950. The teams had met twice during the regular season, with each team winning one game. A Colorado radio personality had referred to the Wolverines as the "Michigan woodchoppers" while a Colorado newspaper reported that Michigan forward George Chin was "as wide as he is high." The championship game was played before a capacity crowd of 2,500 persons at Broadmoor Arena in the Tigers' hometown of Colorado Springs, Colorado. However, all three players on the Tigers' top scoring line, Omer Brandt (injury), Ron Hartwell (injury), and Tony Frasca (ineligible), were unable to play in the championship game.

Michigan won the championship game by a 4-1 score. The Wolverines scored three goals in the first period and led 3-0 at the first intermission. Michigan's first goal was scored by George Chin at 11:35 of the first period with an assist from center Doug Philpott. Five minutes later, at 16:29 of the first period, team captain Earl Keyes scored on a power play with assists from Jim Haas and Reg Shave. Michigan's third goal was scored at 19:07 of the first period during a Colorado College power play. Doug Philpott took a loose puck at center ice and "sent a screaming 35-foot shot into the upper right corner of the net for a 3-0 lead."

Colorado College narrowed Michigan's lead to 3-1 on a goal by Cam Berry at the 5:00 mark of the second period. Five minutes later, at the 10:12 mark of the second period, Graham Cragg scored Michigan's final goal with an assist from Alex MacLellan. Neither team scored in the final 30 minutes of the game.

George Chin was the high scorer of the tournament with four points on two goals and two assists.

=== (W1) Colorado College vs. (W2) Michigan ===
| March 15 | Colorado College | 1 – 4 | Michigan | Broadmoor Ice Palace |

Scoring summary
| Period | Team | Goal | Assist(s) | Time | Score |
|---|---|---|---|---|---|
| 1st | UM | George Chin | Philpott | 11:35 | 1–0 UM |
| 1st | UM | Earl Keyes – GW | Haas and Shave | 16:29 | 2–0 UM |
| 1st | UM | Doug Philpott – SH | unassisted | 19:07 | 3–0 UM |
| 2nd | CC | Cameron Berry | Kennific | 25:00 | 3–1 UM |
| 2nd | UM | Graham Cragg | MacLellan | 30:12 | 4–1 UM |
| 3rd | None | | | | |

Shots by period
| Team | 1 | 2 | 3 | T |
|---|---|---|---|---|
| Michigan | 19 | 16 | 15 | 50 |
| Colorado College | 10 | 13 | 9 | 32 |

Goaltenders
| Team | Name | Saves | Goals against | Time on ice |
|---|---|---|---|---|
| UM | Willard Ikola | 31 | 1 | |
| CC | Ken Kinsley | 46 | 4 | |

Jim Haas, George Chin, John McKennell and Doug Philpott were named to the All-Tournament First Team while Reg Shave and Earl Keyes made the All-Tournament Second Team

== See also ==
- 1952 NCAA Division I Men's Ice Hockey Tournament
- List of NCAA Division I Men's Ice Hockey Tournament champions
