= 1950–51 Michigan Wolverines men's ice hockey season =

Sports season

National champion 1951 NCAA Tournament, champion
- Home ice: Weinberg Coliseum

Record
- Overall: 22–4–1
- Home: 13–2–1
- Road: 7–2
- Neutral: 2–0

Coaches and captains
- Head coach: Vic Heyliger
- Captain: Gil Burford

The 1950–51 Michigan Wolverines men's ice hockey team represented the University of Michigan in intercollegiate college ice hockey during the 1950–51 NCAA men's ice hockey season. The head coach was Vic Heyliger and the team captain was Gil Burford. The team won the 1951 NCAA Men's Ice Hockey Tournament. The team's leading scorer was Neil Celley, who broke Michigan's single-season scoring record with 79 points (40 goals, 39 assists) and led the NCAA in scoring.

== Standings ==
1950–51 NCAA Independent ice hockey standings
	Intercollegiate							Overall					
	GP	W	L	T	Pct.	GF	GA	GP	W	L	T	GF	GA
American International	–	–	–	–	–	–	–	17	8	8	1	–	–
Army	12	1	10	1	.125	29	74	13	2	10	1	33	76
Boston College	–	–	–	–	–	–	–	20	12	8	0	105	89
Boston University	21	16	5	0	.762	149	59	21	16	5	0	149	59
Bowdoin	–	–	–	–	–	–	–	12	6	5	1	–	–
Brown	–	–	–	–	–	–	–	24	18	6	0	172	72
Colby	–	–	–	–	–	–	–	–	–	–	–	–	–
Colorado College	–	–	–	–	–	–	–	25	16	8	1	192	130
Dartmouth	–	–	–	–	–	–	–	19	9	9	1	71	89
Denver	–	–	–	–	–	–	–	23	11	11	1	134	111
Hamilton	–	–	–	–	–	–	–	16	7	9	0	–	–
Harvard	–	–	–	–	–	–	–	23	12	11	0	117	91
Lehigh	1	1	0	0	1.000	6	1	5	4	1	0	35	14
Massachusetts	–	–	–	–	–	–	–	7	0	7	0	10	40
Michigan	20	18	2	0	.900	159	69	27	22	4	1	212	100
Michigan State	–	–	–	–	–	–	–	17	6	11	0	65	95
Michigan Tech	–	–	–	–	–	–	–	21	5	14	2	89	134
Minnesota	–	–	–	–	–	–	–	26	14	12	0	140	112
MIT	–	–	–	–	–	–	–	10	0	10	0	–	–
New Hampshire	–	–	–	–	–	–	–	9	5	4	0	44	34
North Dakota	–	–	–	–	–	–	–	26	12	12	2	116	139
North Dakota Agricultural	–	–	–	–	–	–	–	–	–	–	–	–	–
Northeastern	–	–	–	–	–	–	–	19	8	11	0	90	77
Norwich	–	–	–	–	–	–	–	12	6	6	0	–	–
Princeton	–	–	–	–	–	–	–	18	7	10	1	100	111
Saint Michael's	–	–	–	–	–	–	–	6	3	3	0	33	39
St. Olaf	–	–	–	–	–	–	–	9	5	3	1	–	–
Wyoming	–	–	–	–	–	–	–	12	4	8	0	–	–
Yale	–	–	–	–	–	–	–	17	14	2	1	116	43

=== Schedule ===
During the season Michigan compiled a 22–4–1 record, the fourth consecutive year that the team won at least 80% of their games. Their schedule was as follows.

Date	Opponent	Score	Result	Venue	Location	Record
Dec. 8, 1950	Detroit Auto Club	8–6	Win	Weinberg Coliseum	Ann Arbor, MI	1–0
Dec. 15, 1950	Princeton	11–6	Win	Weinberg Coliseum	Ann Arbor, MI	2–0
Dec. 16, 1950	Princeton	10–2	Win	Weinberg Coliseum	Ann Arbor, MI	3–0
Dec. 21, 1950	Western Ontario	8–2	Win	Weinberg Coliseum	Ann Arbor, MI	4–0
Dec. 22, 1950	Western Ontario	14–1	Win	Weinberg Coliseum	Ann Arbor, MI	5–0
Dec. 27, 1950	Boston College	11–2	Win	Boston Arena	Boston, MA	6–0
Dec. 29, 1950	Boston University	3–2	Win	Boston Arena	Boston, MA	7–0
Jan. 5, 1951	Minnesota	5–4*	Win	Williams Arena	Minneapolis, MN	8–0
Jan. 6, 1951	Minnesota	6–4	Win	Williams Arena	Minneapolis, MN	9–0
Jan. 12, 1951	Montreal	8–8*	Tie	Weinberg Coliseum	Ann Arbor, MI	9–0–1
Jan. 13, 1951	Montreal	2–3	Loss	Weinberg Coliseum	Ann Arbor, MI	9–1–1
Jan. 19, 1951	Minnesota	12–2	Win	Weinberg Coliseum	Ann Arbor, MI	10–1–1
Jan. 20, 1951	Minnesota	8–0	Win	Weinberg Coliseum	Ann Arbor, MI	11–1–1
Feb. 5, 1951	Denver	5–4	Win	DU Arena	Denver, CO	12–1–1
Feb. 7, 1951	Denver	3–5	Loss	DU Arena	Denver, CO	12–2–1
Feb. 9, 1951	Colorado College	6–4	Win	Broadmoor Ice Palace	Colorado Springs, CO	13–2–1
Feb. 10, 1951	Colorado College	7–9	Loss	Broadmoor Ice Palace	Colorado Springs, CO	13–3–1
Feb. 16, 1951	Toronto	9–5	Win	Weinberg Coliseum	Ann Arbor, MI	14–3–1
Feb. 17, 1951	Toronto	4–6	Loss	Weinberg Coliseum	Ann Arbor, MI	14–4–1
Feb. 21, 1951	Michigan State	10–1	Win	Demonstration Hall	East Lansing, MI	15–4–1
Feb. 23, 1951	North Dakota	11–4	Win	Weinberg Coliseum	Ann Arbor, MI	16–4–1
Feb. 24, 1951	North Dakota	12–4	Win	Weinberg Coliseum	Ann Arbor, MI	17–4–1
Mar. 3, 1951	Michigan State	9–6	Win	Weinberg Coliseum	Ann Arbor, MI	18–4–1
Mar. 9, 1951	Michigan Tech	8–3	Win	Weinberg Coliseum	Ann Arbor, MI	19–4–1
Mar. 10, 1951	Michigan Tech	7–4	Win	Weinberg Coliseum	Ann Arbor, MI	20–4–1
NCAA TOURNAMENT
March 15, 1951	Boston University	8–2	Win	Broadmoor World Arena	Colorado Springs, CO	21–4–1
March 17, 1951	Brown	7–1	Win	Broadmoor World Arena	Colorado Springs, CO	22–4–1
		212–100				22–4–1

* Denotes overtime periods

== Roster and scoring statistics ==
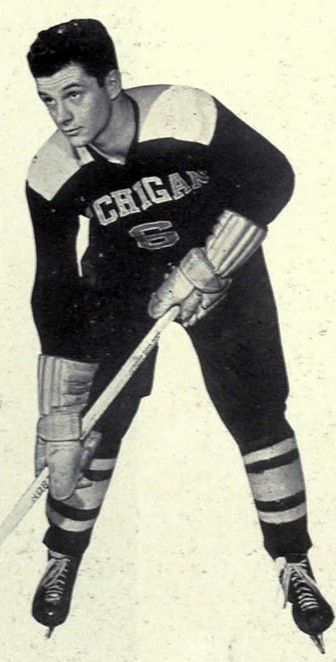
Neil Celley

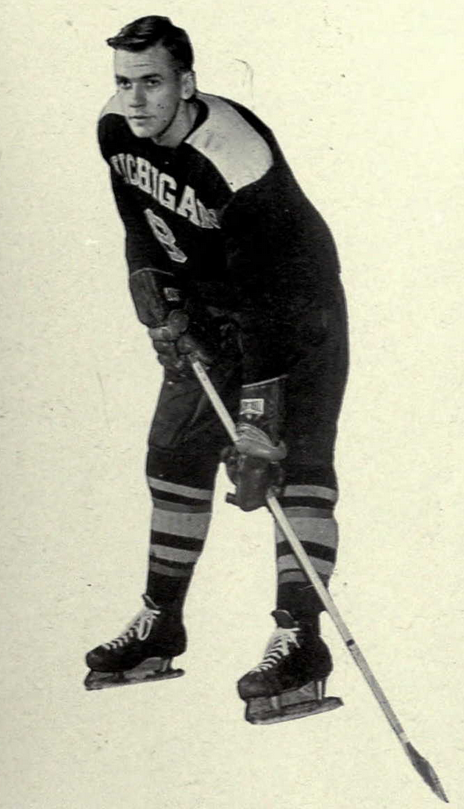
Gil Burford

No.	Name	Year	Position	Hometown	S/P/C	Games	Goals	Assists	Pts	PIM
6	Neil Celley	Senior	LW	Eveleth, MN	(Minnesota)	27	40	39	79	10
8	Gil Burford	Senior	RW	Detroit, MI	(Michigan)	27	37	34	71	8
10	John McKennell	Sophomore	RW	Toronto, ON	(Ontario)	27	35	22	57	24
4	John Matchefts	Sophomore	C	Eveleth, MN	(Minnesota)	27	25	31	56	30
7	Earl Keyes	Sophomore	C/G	Tiverton, ON	(Ontario)	27	18	25	43	28
15	Al Bassey	Senior	F	Walpole, MA	(Massachusetts)	27	16	17	33	14
5	Bob Heathcott	Junior	D	Calgary, AB	(Alberta)	27	12	21	33	40
18	Alex MacLellan	Sophomore	D	Montreal, PQ	(Quebec)	27	7	20	27	47
9	Paul Pelow	Junior	C	Toronto, ON	(Ontario)	17	9	8	17	32
12	Joe Marmo	Senior	LW	East Boston, MA	(Massachusetts)	27	4	12	16	37
11	Graham Cragg	Junior	D	Edmonton, AB	(Alberta)	27	1	12	13	18
14	Gordon Naylor	Sophomore	RW	Montreal, PQ	(Quebec)	27	3	8	11	10
3	Eddie May	Junior	D	Edmonton, AB	(Alberta)	20	4	2	6	8
	Harry Stuhldreher					7	0	0	0	12
1	Hal Downes	Senior	G	Melrose, MA	(Massachusetts)	27	0	0	0	0
Total							212			

== Goaltending Statistics ==
No.	Name	Games	Minutes	Wins	Losses	Ties	Goals Against	Saves	Shut Outs	SV %	GAA
1	Hal Downes	–	–	–	–	–	–	–	1	–	–
7	Earl Keyes	2	–	2	0	0	7	49	0	.875	3.50
Total		27	–	22	4	1	100	–	1	–	–

== 1951 national championship ==
=== (W1) Michigan vs. (E1) Brown ===
March 17	Michigan	7 – 1	Brown	Broadmoor Ice Palace

Scoring summary
Period	Team	Goal	Assist(s)	Time	Score
1st	UM	Eddie May	Naylor and Marmo	03:49	1–0 UM
1st	UM	Gil Burford – GW	MacLellan	15:24	2–0 UM
2nd	UM	Neil Celley	unassisted	26:41	3–0 UM
2nd	UM	John McKennell	unassisted	30:56	4–0 UM
2nd	UM	Al Bassey	Keyes and MacLellan	34:19	5–0 UM
3rd	BRN	Tony Malo	Wheeler	47:54	5–1 UM
3rd	UM	John McKennell	Burford and Keyes	51:15	6–1 UM
3rd	UM	Neil Celley	Burford	59:38	7–1 UM

Shots by period
Team	1	2	3	T
Michigan	17	21	14	52
Brown	5	4	11	20

Goaltenders
Team	Name	Saves	Goals against	Time on ice
UM	Hal Downes	19	1	
BRN	Donald Whiston	45	7	

Bob Heathcott, Gil Burford, John Matchefts and Neil Celley were named to the All-Tournament Team

== Notes ==
Less than year after winning the tournament, Hal Downes was shot down in his B-26 over North Korea and was declared MIA. Though all living POWs were returned to the US in 1953 Downes remained listed as MIA until his remains were returned in 2018.

== See also ==
- 1951 NCAA Division I Men's Ice Hockey Tournament
- List of NCAA Division I Men's Ice Hockey Tournament champions
