= 1952–53 Michigan Wolverines men's ice hockey season =

Sports season

MCHL Co–Champion National champion 1953 NCAA Tournament, champion
- Conference: T–1st MCHL
- Home ice: Michigan Coliseum

Record
- Overall: 17–7–0
- Home: 10–4
- Road: 5–3
- Neutral: 2–0

Coaches and captains
- Head coach: Vic Heyliger
- Captain: John Matchefts

The 1952–53 Michigan Wolverines men's ice hockey team represented the University of Michigan in college ice hockey. In its ninth year under head coach Vic Heyliger, the team compiled a 17–7–0 record, outscored opponents 139 to 71, and won the 1953 NCAA Division I Men's Ice Hockey Tournament. The season was the third consecutive, and the fourth overall under Vic Heyliger, in which the Michigan hockey team won the NCAA championship. The team also finished the regular season in at tie with Minnesota as the co-champion of the Midwest Collegiate Hockey League.

== Individual accomplishments ==
Team captain John Matchefts, a senior from Eveleth, Minnesota, was the leading scorer with 48 points on 18 goals and 30 assists. Michigan left wing Johnny McKennell, a senior from Toronto, was suspended for the remainder of the season after he allegedly punched referee Milo Yalich in Denver, Colorado, following a 5–4 overtime loss to the Denver Pioneers on December 23, 1952. McKennell was accused of slugging Yalich three times while disputing Denver's game-winning overtime goal. Athletic director Fritz Crisler announced the suspension after receiving a notarized report from the president of the Rocky Mountain Hockey Officials Association in early January 1953. McKennell denied hitting the referee and claimed that he was the victim of a plot by Colorado College coach Cheddy Thompson to "get even" with Michigan coach Vic Heyliger. Heyliger opined that the suspension was too severe, noting that McKennell had no prior disciplinary action in three years and the evidence was conflicting as to whether McKennell even hit Yalich. Heyliger noted, "This has ruined Johnny's whole college career."

Right winger Earl Keyes, who served as captain of the 1951–52 Michigan hockey team, graduated in January 1953 and played his final game for the Wolverines on January 17, 1953. At the time, The Michigan Daily called Keyes "[o]ne of the best players in Michigan hockey history" and praised him for his versatility. Keyes played at the center position for two-and-a-half years, moved to right wing in 1952, appeared in several games as a defensemen, and even played at the goalie position for two games. In two games at goalie, he had 49 saves in back-to-back victories over Michigan Tech during the 1950-51 season.

Earl Keyes, Alex MacLellan, John Matchefts and John McKennell are the only men's ice hockey players in NCAA history to win three national titles. Additionally, they are among the only players to play in a national championship game each season in which they had eligibility (3 seasons for players prior to 1969, 4 seasons for players after 1969).

== 1953 NCAA Tournament ==
In the 1953 NCAA Division I Men's Ice Hockey Tournament, Michigan and Minnesota were invited to represent the west, and Boston University and Rensselaer Polytechnic were invited to represent the east. In the first round, the Wolverines defeated the Boston University Terriers by a 14–2 score.

In the championship game, Michigan faced Minnesota before a capacity crowd of 2,700 at Broadmoor Arena in Colorado Springs, Colorado. Michigan and Minnesota had played four games in the regular season, with Minnesota winning three of the four contests. In mid-February, the Golden Gophers had swept a two-game series in Minneapolis by scores of 5-2 and 4–0.

Minnesota led 2–1 at the end of the first period of the championship game. Jim Haas gave Michigan a 1–0 lead with a goal at the 5:48 mark of the opening period (assist by Alex MacLellan), but Minnesota took the lead on goals by Dick Meredith and Dick Dougherty. In the second period, Michigan scored two goals to take a 3–2 lead. Doug Philpott scored at the 6:15 mark (with an assist by Reg Shave) to tie the score at 2-2, and Doug Mullen put Michigan in the lead with a goal at the 11:08 mark (with assists by George Chin and Pat Cooney). Michigan added three goals in the first ten minutes of the third period to extend the lead to 6–2. John Matchefts scored an unassisted power play goal at 3:38 of the third period; Jim Haas added an unassisted goal at the 7:17 mark; and Doug Philpott scored on a power play at 9:14 with an assist from Haas. Minnesota scored on a goal by Yackel at 10:42, and Matchefts closed out the scoring with an empty net goal with 11 second left in the game (assist by Philpott). With four goals in the third period, Michigan won its third consecutive NCAA championship, defeating the Golden Gophers by a 7–3 score.

Alex McLellan and John Matchefts were chosen for the first-team All-Tournament Team. Matchefts was named the Most Outstanding Player in the tournament.

== Standings ==
1952–53 Midwest Collegiate Hockey League
	Conference							Overall					
	GP	W	L	T	PTS	GF	GA	GP	W	L	T	GF	GA
Minnesota†	20	16	4	0	19	92	46	29	23	6	0	149	74
Michigan†	16	12	4	0	19	91	49	24	17	7	0	139	71
North Dakota	16	11	5	0	17	82	59	20	15	5	0	109	68
Denver	16	10	6	0	15	70	54	24	17	6	1	142	79
Colorado College	14	4	10	0	8	52	86	20	9	11	0	98	106
Michigan Tech	16	3	13	0	4	53	94	19	6	13	0	75	100
Michigan State	18	2	16	0	2	45	94	22	5	16	1	74	104
† indicates conference regular season champion

== Schedule ==
Date	Opponent^{#}	Rank^{#}	Site	Result	Record
Regular season
December 6	vs. St. Lawrence*		Weinberg Coliseum • Ann Arbor, Michigan	W 6–1	1–0–0
December 13	vs. Toronto*		Weinberg Coliseum • Ann Arbor, Michigan	W 6–3	2–0–0
December 19	at Colorado College		Broadmoor World Arena • Colorado Springs, Colorado	W 3–2	3–0–0 (1–0–0)
December 20	at Colorado College		Broadmoor World Arena • Colorado Springs, Colorado	W 10–6	4–0–0 (2–0–0)
December 22	at Denver		DU Arena • Denver, Colorado	W 5–2	5–0–0 (3–0–0)
December 23	at Denver		DU Arena • Denver, Colorado	L 4–5 ^{OT}	5–1–0 (3–1–0)
January 7	at Michigan State		Demonstration Hall • East Lansing, Michigan	W 6–0	6–1–0 (4–1–0)
January 9	vs. Montreal*		Weinberg Coliseum • Ann Arbor, Michigan	W 13–2	7–1–0 (4–1–0)
January 10	vs. Montreal*		Weinberg Coliseum • Ann Arbor, Michigan	L 1–2	7–2–0 (4–1–0)
January 14	vs. Michigan State		Weinberg Coliseum • Ann Arbor, Michigan	W 10–2	8–2–0 (5–1–0)
January 16	vs. Minnesota		Weinberg Coliseum • Ann Arbor, Michigan	L 3–4	8–3–0 (5–2–0)
January 17	vs. Minnesota		Weinberg Coliseum • Ann Arbor, Michigan	W 5–4	9–3–0 (6–2–0)
February 11	vs. Michigan State		Weinberg Coliseum • Ann Arbor, Michigan	W 4–0	10–3–0 (7–2–0)
February 13	at Minnesota		Williams Arena • Minneapolis, Minnesota	L 2–5	10–4–0 (7–3–0)
February 14	at Minnesota		Williams Arena • Minneapolis, Minnesota	L 0–4	10–5–0 (7–4–0)
February 20	vs. North Dakota		Weinberg Coliseum • Ann Arbor, Michigan	W 5–3	11–5–0 (8–4–0)
February 21	vs. North Dakota		Weinberg Coliseum • Ann Arbor, Michigan	W 8–3	12–5–0 (9–4–0)
February 27	vs. McGill*		Weinberg Coliseum • Ann Arbor, Michigan	L 0–7	12–6–0 (9–4–0)
February 28	vs. McGill*		Weinberg Coliseum • Ann Arbor, Michigan	L 1–2	12–7–0 (9–4–0)
March 4	at Michigan State		Demonstration Hall • East Lansing, Michigan	W 8–4	13–7–0 (10–4–0)
March 6	vs. Michigan Tech		Weinberg Coliseum • Ann Arbor, Michigan	W 8–3	14–7–0 (11–4–0)
March 7	vs. Michigan Tech		Weinberg Coliseum • Ann Arbor, Michigan	W 10–2	15–7–0 (12–4–0)
NCAA Tournament
March 13	vs. Boston University*		Broadmoor World Arena • Colorado Springs, Colorado (National Semifinal)	W 14–2	16–7–0 (12–4–0)
March 14	vs. Minnesota*		Broadmoor World Arena • Colorado Springs, Colorado (National championship)	W 7–3	17–7–0 (12–4–0)
*Non-conference game. Source:

== Roster and scoring statistics ==
No.	Name	Year	Position	Hometown	S/P/C	Games	Goals	Assists	Pts	PIM
4	John Matchefts	Senior	C	Eveleth, MN	(Minnesota)	24	18	30	48	24
6	George Chin	Junior	RW	Lucknow, ON	(Ontario)	24	20	27	47	0
19	Doug Mullen	Junior	C	Grass Lake, MI	(Michigan)	24	20	19	39	10
8	Pat Cooney	Junior	LW	Riverside, ON	(Ontario)	24	15	19	34	40
12	Doug Philpott	Junior	RW	Sarnia, ON	(Ontario)	24	16	13	29	24
2	Jim Haas	Junior	D	Nipawin, SK	(Saskatchewan)	24	7	16	23	16
7	Earl Keyes	Senior	C	Tiverton, ON	(Ontario)	12	12	8	20	8
18	Alex MacLellan	Senior	D	Montreal, PQ	(Quebec)	24	1	15	16	67
10	John McKennell	Senior	RW	Toronto, ON	(Ontario)	6	7	5	12	6
17	Reg Shave	Junior	D	Yorkton, SK	(Saskatchewan)	24	7	5	12	32
5	Burt Dunn	Sophomore	D	Montreal, PQ	(Quebec)	24	4	7	11	42
15	Ron Martinson	Senior	LW	Eveleth, MN	(Minnesota)	17	7	2	9	16
14	Telly Mascarin	Sophomore	C	Windsor, ON	(Ontario)	24	4	4	8	7
16	Louis Paolatto	Junior	D	Windsor, ON	(Ontario)	24	1	3	4	46
1	Bill Lucier	Sophomore	G	Windsor, ON	(Ontario)	8	0	0	0	0
1	Willard Ikola	Junior	G	Eveleth, MN	(Minnesota)	20	0	0	0	0
Total										

Albert P. Pickus, a senior from Sioux City, Iowa, was awarded the Manager's "M" for his service as the team's manager.

== 1953 national championship ==
=== Minnesota vs. Michigan ===
March 14	Minnesota	3 – 7	Michigan	Broadmoor Ice Palace

Scoring summary
Period	Team	Goal	Assist(s)	Time	Score
1st	UM	Jim Haas	MacLellan	05:48	1–0 UM
1st	MIN	Dick Meredith	Yackel	8:39	1–1
1st	MIN	Dick Dougherty	Campbell	11:34	2–1 MIN
2nd	UM	Doug Philpott	Shave	26:15	2–2
2nd	UM	Doug Mullen	Chin and Cooney	31:08	3–2 UM
3rd	UM	John Matchefts – GW PP	unassisted	43:38	4–2 UM
3rd	UM	Jim Haas	unassisted	47:17	5–2 UM
3rd	UM	Doug Philpott – PP	Haas	49:14	6–2 UM
3rd	MIN	Ken Yackel	Johnson and Dougherty	50:42	6–3 UM
3rd	UM	John Matchefts – EN	Philpott	59:49	7–3 UM

Shots by period
Team	1	2	3	T
Michigan	14	11	9	34
Minnesota	12	10	6	28

Goaltenders
Team	Name	Saves	Goals against	Time on ice
UM	Willard Ikola	25	3	
MIN	Jim Mattson	28	6	

== See also ==
- 1953 NCAA Division I Men's Ice Hockey Tournament
- List of NCAA Division I Men's Ice Hockey Tournament champions
