= Minnesota Golden Gophers men's ice hockey notable players and award winners =

A full list of Minnesota Golden Gophers men's ice hockey notable players and award winners.

== National ==
=== Hobey Baker Award ===
- Neal Broten - 1981
- Robb Stauber - 1988
- Brian Bonin - 1996
- Jordan Leopold - 2002

=== First Team All-Americans ===
- John Mariucci - 1940
- Harold Paulsen - 1940
- Gordon Watters - 1951
- Larry Ross - 1952
- John Mayasich - 1954, 1955
- Richard Dougherty - 1954
- Jim Mattson - 1954
- Ken Yackel - 1954
- Richard Burg - 1958
- Jack McCartan - 1958
- Murray Williamson - 1959
- Lou Nanne - 1963
- Craig Falkman - 1964
- Doug Woog - 1965
- Gary Gambucci - 1968
- Murray McLachlan - 1970
- Wally Olds - 1970
- Les Auge - 1975
- Mike Polich - 1975
- William Baker - 1979
- Tim Harrer - 1980
- Neal Broten - 1981
- Steve Ulseth - 1981
- Pat Micheletti - 1985
- Robb Stauber - 1988
- Brian Bonin - 1995, 1996
- Mike Crowley - 1996, 1997
- Jordan Leopold - 2001, 2002
- John Pohl - 2002
- Keith Ballard - 2004
- Ryan Potulny - 2006
- Alex Goligoski - 2007
- Ryan Stoa - 2009
- Mike Reilly - 2014, 2015
- Tyler Sheehy - 2017
- Rem Pitlick - 2019
- Sampo Ranta - 2021
- Brock Faber - 2023
- Logan Cooley - 2023
- Matthew Knies - 2023
- Sam Rinzel - 2025

== Western Collegiate Hockey Association ==
Player of the Year

- Lou Nanne - 1963
- Murray McLachlan - 1969, 1970
- Mike Polich - 1975
- Tim Harrer - 1980
- Steve Ulseth - 1981
- Robb Stauber - 1988
- Brian Bonin - 1995, 1996
- Mike Crowley - 1997

Defensive Player of the Year

- Jordan Leopold - 2001, 2002
- Alex Goligoski - 2007

Goaltender of the Year

- Robb Stauber - 1988, 1989

Rookie of the Year

- Gary Gambucci - 1966
- Murray McLachlan - 1968
- Aaron Broten - 1980
- Darby Hendrickson - 1992
- Mike Crowley - 1995
- Thomas Vanek - 2003
- Phil Kessel - 2006
- Jordan Schroeder - 2009

Tournament MVP

- Travis Richards - 1993
- Chris McAlpine - 1994
- Brian Bonin - 1996
- Grant Potulny - 2003
- Kellen Briggs - 2004
- Blake Wheeler - 2007
- Alex Kangas - 2008

Student-Athlete of the Year

- Justin McHugh - 1995
- Dan Trebil - 1996

Coach of the Year

- Glen Sonmor - 1970
- Herb Brooks - 1974
- Brad Buetow - 1980
- Doug Woog - 1990
- Don Lucia - 2006

== Big Ten Conference ==
Player of the Year

- Adam Wilcox - 2014
- Tyler Sheehy - 2017
- Ben Meyers - 2022

Defensive Player of the Year

- Mike Reilly - 2014, 2015
- Jake Bischoff - 2017
- Brock Faber - 2022

Goaltender of the Year

- Adam Wilcox - 2014
- Eric Schierhorn - 2016, 2017
- Jack LaFontaine - 2021

Tournament Most Outstanding Player

- Adam Wilcox - 2015
- Jack LaFontaine - 2021

Coach of the Year

- Don Lucia - 2014
- Bob Motzko - 2022

== Hall of Famers ==
=== Hockey Hall of Fame ===
- Herb Brooks
- John Mariucci

=== United States Hockey Hall of Fame ===
- Herb Brooks
- Aaron Broten
- Neal Broten
- Dick Dougherty
- Rob Johnson
- Reed Larson
- Jack McCartan
- John Mariucci
- John Mayasich
- Lou Nanne
- Mike Ramsey
- Larry Ross
- Murray Williamson
- Doug Woog
- Ken Yackel
- Martin Spasov

=== United States Olympic Hall of Fame ===
- Herb Brooks (coach)
- 1960 Olympic Men's Ice Hockey Team:
  John Mayasich
  Jack McCartan
  Dick Meredith
- 1980 Olympic Men's Ice Hockey Team:
  Bill Baker
  Neal Broten
  Steve Christoff
  Steve Janaszak
  Rob McClanahan
  Mike Ramsey
  Buzz Schneider
  Eric Strobel
  Phil Verchota
  Herb Brooks (coach)
