= Omer Brandt =

Canadian ice hockey player (1926–2019)

- Born: October 19, 1926 Swan Lake, Manitoba, CAN
- Died: January 13, 2019 (aged 92)
- Position: Forward
- Played for: Colorado College
- Playing career: 1950–1953

Omer Brandt (1926-2019) was a Canadian ice hockey forward who played for Colorado College in the 1950s.

== Career ==
Brandt earned a college scholarship through his ability on the ice and began attending Colorado College in 1949. While he was with the freshman team, CC won its first National Championship. When Brandt joined the varsity squad the following year, he became an instant hit on offense, finishing as one of the top scorers in the nation with 59 points in 25 games. Brant helped CC return to the national tournament but the defense faltered and the Tigers allowed 15 goals in 2 games, finishing 4th. Brandt nearly repeated his performance in his junior season, finishing with 54 points in 25 games, and earned recognition on the All-MCHL First Team and was an AHCA Second Team All-American.

Colorado College again made the tournament and were heading for the same fate when they fell behind Yale 0–3 in the first period, but Brandt scored CC's first goal and began a monumental comeback that saw the Tigers win 4–3. In the championship game, however, Michigan was too much for the Tigers and Brandt's team lost 1–4. Many of CC's top players graduated in 1952 and weren't readily replaced, causing the Tigers to drop in the standings the following year. Brandt's point total slipped to 34 in 20 games but he still led the team in scoring.

Brandt graduated from Colorado College while majoring in Physics and math and returned to Canada to take a job with Mobil Oil. He remained with the company for 35 years, moving around Canada and the United States, before settling in Calgary where he remained after his retirement.

== Personal ==
Omer and his wife Sophie raised four boys in the Calgary area.

== Statistics ==
=== Regular season and playoffs ===
			Regular season					Playoffs
Season	Team	League	GP	G	A	Pts	PIM	GP	G	A	Pts	PIM
1950–51	Colorado College	NCAA	25	25	34	59	—	—	—	—	—	—
1951–52	Colorado College	MCHL	25	30	24	54	29	—	—	—	—	—
1952–53	Colorado College	MCHL	20	15	19	34	—	—	—	—	—	—
NCAA totals			70	70	77	147	—	—	—	—	—	—

== Awards and honors ==
Award	Year
NCAA All-Tournament Second Team	1951
All-MCHL First Team	1951–52
AHCA First Team All-American	1951–52
