= List of NCAA Division I men's Frozen Four appearances by team =

This is a list of NCAA men's Division I ice hockey tournament Frozen Four appearances by team. 43 different programs have reached the Frozen Four in the history of the tournament.

Years in bold indicate the team was the tournament's eventual champions.

== Total Frozen Four appearances ==
The following is a list of National Collegiate Athletic Association (NCAA) Division I college ice hockey teams that have qualified for the NCAA Division I men's ice hockey championship Frozen Four as of 2026, with teams listed by number of appearances.

NCAA men's Division I ice hockey tournament
School	Frozen Four appearances	Frozen Four years	Wins	Losses	Win%	Titles
Michigan	29	**1948**, 1949, 1950, **1951**, **1952**, **1953**, 1954, **1955**, **1956**, 1957, 1962, **1964**, 1977, 1992, 1993, 1995, **1996**, 1997, **1998**, 2001, 2002, 2003, 2008, 2011, 2018, 2022, 2023, 2024, 2026	26	19	.578	9
Boston College	26	1948, **1949**, 1950, 1954, 1956, 1959, 1963, 1965, 1968, 1973, 1978, 1985, 1990, 1998, 1999, 2000, **2001**, 2004, 2006, 2007, **2008**, **2010**, **2012**, 2014, 2016, 2024	20	25	.444	5
Boston University	25	1950, 1951, 1953, 1960, 1966, 1967, **1971**, **1972**, 1974, 1975, 1976, 1977, **1978**, 1990, 1991, 1993, 1994, **1995**, 1996, 1997, **2009**, 2015, 2023, 2024, 2025	22	23	.489	5
Minnesota	23	1953, 1954, 1961, 1971, **1974**, 1975, **1976**, **1979**, 1981, 1983, 1986, 1987, 1988, 1989, 1994, 1995, **2002**, **2003**, 2005, 2012, 2014, 2022, 2023	21	19	.525	5
North Dakota	23	1958, **1959**, **1963**, 1965, 1967, 1968, 1979, **1980**, **1982**, 1984, **1987**, **1997**, **2000**, 2001, 2005, 2006, 2007, 2008, 2011, 2014, 2015, **2016**, 2026	23	16	.590	8
Denver	20	**1958**, **1960**, **1961**, 1963, 1964, 1966, **1968**, **1969**, 1971, 1972, 1973†, 1986, **2004**, **2005**, 2016, **2017**, 2019, **2022**, **2024,** 2025, **2026**	24	11	.686	11
Harvard	13	1955, 1957, 1958, 1969, 1971, 1974, 1975, 1983, 1986, 1987, **1989**, 1994, 2017	6	18	.250	1
Wisconsin	12	1970, 1972, **1973**, **1977**, 1978, **1981**, 1982, **1983**, **1990**, 1992†, **2006**, 2010, 2026	17	7	.708	6
Maine	11	1988, 1989, 1991, **1993**, 1995, **1999**, 2000, 2002, 2004, 2006, 2007	8	10	.444	2
Michigan State	11	1959, **1966**, 1967, 1984, **1986**, 1987, 1989, 1992, 1999, 2001, **2007**	10	9	.526	3
Colorado College	10	1948, 1949, **1950**, 1951, 1952, 1955, **1957**, 1996, 1997, 2005	7	10	.412	2
Michigan Tech	10	1956, 1960, **1962**, **1965**, 1969, 1970, 1974, **1975**, 1976, 1981	11	9	.550	3
St. Lawrence	9	1952, 1955, 1956, 1959, 1960, 1961, 1962, 1988, 2000	3	14	.176	0
Cornell	8	**1967**, 1968, 1969, **1970**, 1972, 1973, 1980, 2003	7	8	.467	2
Minnesota Duluth	8	1984, 1985, 2004, **2011**, 2017, **2018**, **2019**, 2021	9	5	.643	3
Clarkson	7	1957, 1958, 1962, 1963, 1966, 1970, 1991	6	7	.462	0
New Hampshire	7	1977, 1979, 1982, 1998, 1999, 2002, 2003	2	10	.167	0
Providence	5	1964, 1983, 1985, **2015**, 2019	4	5	.444	1
Rensselaer	5	1953, **1954**, 1961, 1964, **1985**	6	4	.600	2
Dartmouth	4	1948, 1949, 1979, 1980	4	4	.500	0
Lake Superior State	4	**1988**, **1992**, 1993, **1994**	7	1	.875	3
Notre Dame	4	2008, 2011, 2017, 2018	2	4	.333	0
Brown	3	1951, 1965, 1976	2	4	.333	0
Northern Michigan	3	1980, 1981, **1991**	3	3	.500	1
Quinnipiac	3	2013, 2016, **2023**	4	2	.667	1
Bowling Green	2	1978, **1984**	3	1	.750	1
UMass	2	2019, **2021**	3	1	.750	1
Miami (OH)	2	2009, 2010	1	2	.333	0
Minnesota State	2	2021, 2022	1	2	.333	0
Ohio State	2	1998, 2018	0	2	.000	0
St. Cloud State	2	2013, 2021	1	2	.333	0
Union	2	2012, **2014**	2	1	.667	1
Vermont	2	1996, 2009	0	2	.000	0
Yale	2	1952, **2013**	3	1	.750	1
Bemidji State	1	2009	0	1	.000	0
Colgate	1	1990	1	1	.500	0
Ferris State	1	2012	1	1	.500	0
Massachusetts Lowell	1	2013	0	1	.000	0
Northeastern	1	1982	1	1	.500	0
Omaha	1	2015	0	1	.000	0
Penn State	1	2025	0	1	.000	0
RIT	1	2010	0	1	.000	0
Western Michigan	1	**2025**	2	0	1.000	1

† = Appearance vacated by the NCAA.

=== Vacated Frozen Four appearances ===
- 1973 - Denver vacated their appearance due to NCAA infractions.
- 1992 - Wisconsin vacated their appearance due to NCAA infractions.

== See also ==
- Frozen Four
