= Wally Kilrea Jr. =

American ice hockey player

- Born: Hershey, Pennsylvania, USA
- Height: 5 ft 7 in (170 cm)
- Weight: 165 lb (75 kg; 11 st 11 lb)
- Position: Forward
- Shot: Right
- Played for: Yale
- Playing career: 1951–1954

Walter Charles "Wally" Kilrea Jr. is an American retired ice hockey forward who was the first All-American for Yale.

== Career ==
The son of NHLer Wally Kilrea, Wally Jr. grew up around hockey and when his time came to choose his junior path, Kilrea the younger chose to head to college. He joined Yale's varsity team in 1951, after a year on the freshman team, and provided a spark to the Bulldog's offense. He led the Bulldogs in scoring as a sophomore and helped the team reach the NCAA Tournament for the first time in 1952. The team finished in 3rd place after losing a nail-biter against Colorado College in the semifinal and Kilrea made the All-Tournament Second Team.

Kilrea continued to play well for Yale, leading the team in scoring each of his three seasons with the team. He was named team captain for his senior season and scored a then-program record 28 assists. Kilrea finished with a new program record of 115 points and was the first Bulldog to hit the century mark (assists were not an official stat prior to 1934). For his tremendous season, Kilrea was named as an AHCA First Team All-American in 1954.

== Statistics ==
=== Regular season and playoffs ===
			Regular season					Playoffs
Season	Team	League	GP	G	A	Pts	PIM	GP	G	A	Pts	PIM
1951–52	Yale	Pentagonal League	—	12	24	36	—	—	—	—	—	—
1952–53	Yale	Pentagonal League	—	19	14	33	—	—	—	—	—	—
1953–54	Yale	Pentagonal League	—	18	28	46	—	—	—	—	—	—
NCAA totals			—	49	66	115	—	—	—	—	—	—

== Awards and honors ==
Award	Year
NCAA All-Tournament Second Team	1952
AHCA Second Team All-American	1953–54
