= Ken Kinsley =

Canadian ice hockey player (born 1932)

- Born: 1932 Calgary, Alberta, Canada
- Height: 5 ft 11 in (180 cm)
- Weight: 160 lb (73 kg; 11 st 6 lb)
- Position: Goaltender
- Played for: Colorado College
- Playing career: 1951–1954

Kenneth Kinsley is a Canadian retired ice hockey goaltender who was the MOP of the 1952 NCAA Tournament for Colorado College.

== Career ==
Kinsley began attending Colorado College a year after the program won its first National Championship and became the team's starting goaltender in his sophomore season. With many seniors on the squad being holdovers from the title team, Kinsley produced a tremendous season, helping CC win the inaugural MCHL championship with a record of 18–4–1. He was named to both the All-MCHL First Team and was an AHCA Second Team All-American for his efforts. Unfortunately, because Colorado College didn't keep goaltending records at the time, none of his individual statistics are precisely known.

He backstopped CC to their fifth consecutive championship appearance, but in the semifinal it looked as if the moment might be too much for the young goaltender. Kinsley allowed three goals in the first 9 minutes of the game and Yale took a sizeable lead. However, after that Kinsley settled down and held the fort as the Tigers chapped away at the lead over the remaining 50 minutes and, with less than five minutes to go, the game-winner was knocked into Yale's net and gave CC a trip to their second championship game. In the title match Michigan too jumped out to a 3–0 lead, but the Wolverines were a different animal than the Bulldogs. Michigan outplayed and outshot Colorado College all game, finishing with 50 shots to CC's 32. Kinsley stopped 46 attempts, a very strong effort, but the Tigers couldn't manage more than 1 goal and Michigan skated away with the championship. At the time the practice was to award the Most Outstanding Player to a member not on the winning team; Kinsley's heroics in both games made him a natural choice as no one could fault him for CC's inability to score against Michigan. The award criteria were changed after 1952 and on only three occasions since has it gone to a player not on the winning team (as of 2020).

After 1952 CC had trouble replacing their graduating star players and the team sputtered to a record of 9–11 before rebounding with a 14–9–1 mark in Kinsley's senior season, but that wasn't good enough to get them back to the tournament.

== Awards and honors ==
Award	Year
All-MCHL First Team	1951–52
AHCA Second Team All-American	1951–52
NCAA All-Tournament First Team	1952

Awards and achievements
Preceded by Donald Whiston	NCAA Tournament Most Outstanding Player; 1952	Succeeded by John Matchefts
