= 1952 NCAA men's ice hockey tournament =

College ice hockey tournament

- Teams: 4
- Finals site: Broadmoor Ice Palace, Colorado Springs, Colorado
- Champions: Michigan Wolverines (3rd title)
- Runner-up: Colorado College Tigers (2nd title game)
- Semifinalists: Yale Bulldogs (1st Frozen Four); St. Lawrence Saints (1st Frozen Four)
- Winning coach: Vic Heyliger (3rd title)
- MOP: Ken Kinsley (Colorado College)
- Attendance: 8,600

The 1952 NCAA Men's Ice Hockey Tournament was the culmination of the 1951–52 NCAA men's ice hockey season, the fifth such tournament in NCAA history. It was held from 13 to 15 March 1952, and concluded with Michigan defeating Colorado College 4-1. All games were played at the Broadmoor Ice Palace in Colorado Springs, Colorado.

This was the first tournament to include teams that played in a conference. The MCHL had been created before the start of the season, and though both of the conference representatives had appeared in the tournament previously, both were independent. The Tri-State League also sent its first representative to the tournament after the conference began play the year before.

== Qualifying teams ==
Four teams qualified for the tournament, two each from the eastern and western regions. The two best MCHL teams and a Tri-State League representative received bids into the tournament as did one independent school.

East							West						
Seed	School	Conference	Record	Berth type	Appearance	Last bid	Seed	School	Conference	Record	Berth type	Appearance	Last bid
1	St. Lawrence	Tri-State League	15–3–0	At-Large	1st	Never	1	Colorado College	MCHL	18–4–1	At-Large	5th	1951
2	Yale	Independent	16–7–0	At-Large	1st	Never	2	Michigan	MCHL	20–4–0	At-Large	5th	1951

== Format ==
The eastern team judged as better was seeded as the top eastern team while the MCHL champion was given the top western seed. The second eastern seed was slotted to play the top western seed and vice versa. All games were played at the Broadmoor Ice Palace. All matches were Single-game eliminations with the semifinal winners advancing to the national championship game and the losers playing in a consolation game.

== Bracket ==
Semifinals; March 13–14
E1	St. Lawrence	3
W2	Michigan	9
W1	Colorado College	4
E2	Yale	3

National championship March 15
W2	Michigan	4
W1	Colorado College	1
Third-place game
E1	St. Lawrence	1
E2	Yale	4

Note: * denotes overtime period(s)

== Results ==
=== Semifinals ===
==== St. Lawrence vs. Michigan ====
March 13	St. Lawrence	3 – 9	Michigan	Broadmoor Ice Palace	Recap
No Scoring		First period	08:36 - Graham Cragg (Mullin); 11:06 - George Chin (unassisted); 13:48 - John McKennell (Pelow); 14:24 - Pat Cooney (Chin); 19:59 - Reg Shave(unassisted)
(Karlan) Robert Scott - 14:43		Second period	04:28 - John McKennell (Haas)
(D. Langill) Brian McFarlane - 06:26 (unassisted) Chet Stefanovich - 18:08		Third period	08:30 - Pat Cooney (Philpott); 11:22 - Alex MacLellan (Chin); 12:26 - Earl Keyes (unassisted)
John Boylan		Goalie stats	Willard Ikola

==== Colorado College vs. Yale ====
March 14	Colorado College	4 – 3	Yale	Broadmoor Ice Palace	Recap
(unassisted) Omer Brandt - 08:51		First period	01:50 - Dan Lufkin (Quinn); 04:06 - Fulton Brown (Shay, Kilrea) ?? - Frank Kittredge
Cam Berry - 07:12		Second period
(unassisted) Len Metheany - SH - ?? Steve Soligo - GW - 15:30		Third period
Ken Kinsley		Goalie stats	Paul Cruikshank

=== Consolation Game ===
==== St. Lawrence vs. Yale ====
March 15	St. Lawrence	1 – 4	Yale	Broadmoor Ice Palace	Recap
No Scoring		First period	01:18 - Lawrence Noble Jr. (Howe)
		Second period	01:25 - GW - Charles Smith (unassisted)
(Stefanowicz, Langill) Cliff Olsen - 10:59		Third period	01:24 - Wally Kilrea Jr. (Shay); 14:45 - Dan Lufkin (Douglas)
John Boylan		Goalie stats	Paul Cruikshank

=== National Championship ===
==== Colorado College vs. Michigan ====
March 15	Colorado College	1 – 4	Michigan	Broadmoor Ice Palace

Scoring summary
Period	Team	Goal	Assist(s)	Time	Score
1st	UM	George Chin	Philpott	11:35	1–0 UM
1st	UM	Earl Keyes – GW	Haas and Shave	16:29	2–0 UM
1st	UM	Doug Philpott – SH	unassisted	19:07	3–0 UM
2nd	CC	Cameron Berry	Kennific	25:00	3–1 UM
2nd	UM	Graham Cragg	MacLellan	30:12	4–1 UM
3rd	None				
Penalty summary
Period	Team	Player	Penalty	Time	PIM
1st	UM	Reggie Shave	Tripping		2:00
1st	CC	Cameron Berry	Tripping		2:00
1st	CC	Fred Eastwood	Tripping		2:00
1st	UM	Doug Mullen	Holding		2:00
2nd	UM	Jim Haas	Advancing puck with hand		2:00
2nd	CC	Fred Eastwood	Slashing		2:00
2nd	UM	Graham Cragg	Holding		2:00
2nd	CC	Ed Robson	Tripping		2:00
2nd	UM	Graham Cragg	Misconduct		10:00
3rd	UM	Ron Martinson	Advancing puck with hand		2:00
3rd	UM	John McKennell	Tripping		2:00
3rd	CC	Cameron Berry	Tripping		2:00
3rd	CC	Fred Eastwood	Tripping		2:00

Shots by period
Team	1	2	3	T
Michigan	19	16	15	50
Colorado College	10	13	9	32

Goaltenders
Team	Name	Saves	Goals against	Time on ice
UM	Willard Ikola	31	1	
CC	Ken Kinsley	46	4	

== All-Tournament team ==
=== First Team ===
- G: Ken Kinsley* (Colorado College)
- D: Jim Haas (Michigan)
- D: Len Maccini (Colorado College)
- F: George Chin (Michigan)
- F: John McKennell (Michigan)
- F: Doug Philpott (Michigan)

* Most Outstanding Player(s)

=== Second Team ===
- G: Paul Cruikshank (Yale)
- D: Steve Leolich (Colorado College)
- D: Reg Shave (Michigan)
- F: Earl Keyes (Michigan)
- F: Wally Kilrea Jr. (Yale)
- F: Omer Brandt (Colorado College)
