= Neil Celley =

American ice hockey player and coach

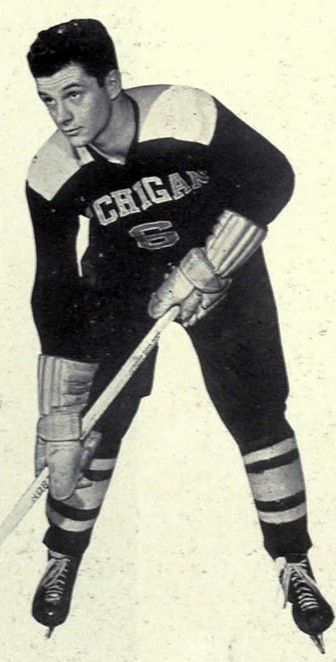
- Neil Celley

Biographical details
- Born: Eveleth, MN, USA
- Education: Michigan

Playing career
- 1945–1946: Michigan
- 1948: US Olympic Team
- 1948–1951: Michigan
- Position: Left wing

Coaching career (HC unless noted)
- 1951–1956: Denver

Head coaching record
- Overall: 76-42-6 (.637)

Accomplishments and honors

Championships
- 1951 National Championship

Neil 'The Seal' Celley (1927-2019) was an American ice hockey coach and player who was a member of the US national team at the 1948 Winter Olympics.

== Career ==
Neil Celley joined the Michigan ice hockey team after winning a state championship in 1945. He left the program a year later to take part in first Winter Olympics since 1936 (due to World War II) and was chosen as a member of the USOC's squad. A competing USA team was also sent to St. Moritz that year, one representing the Amateur Hockey Association that openly allowed professional players in their lineup. After tense negotiations the AHA team was allowed to play in the games but only in an unofficial capacity (they would be ineligible for a medal). The USOC team was allowed to march in the opening ceremony which would be the extent to which Celley could contribute to the team.

Celley returned to Ann Arbor the following fall and finished out his college career without further interruption. He played in 3 consecutive NCAA tournaments finally winning one in his senior season. Celley was named to the All tournament team and recorded a team record 37 goals and 37 assists in the regular season (later broken by Red Berenson).

After graduating from the School of Education in 1951 Celley immediately began his coaching career at Denver, taking over the two-year-old program from Vern Turner. While receiving his Master of Arts in 1952 Celley led the Pioneers to a second-place finish (tied) in the newly created MCHL, unfortunately his alma mater Michigan (with whom his team had tied) was selected for the 1952 tournament instead. Celley's teams would finish with a winning record every year but were never selected for the postseason tournament. In 1956, after kicking four players off the squad for violating team rules, Celley stepped down mid-season and ended his coaching career.

== Head coaching record ==
Record table
Season	Team	Overall	Conference	Standing	Postseason
Denver Pioneers (MCHL) (1951–1953)
1951–52	Denver	18-6-1	9-3-0	t-2nd	
1952–53	Denver	17-6-1	10-6-0	4th	
Denver:		35-12-2	19-9-0		
Denver Pioneers (WIHL) (1953–1956)
1953–54	Denver	16-9-0	7-7-0	4th	
1954–55	Denver	18-11-1	8-9-1	5th	
1955–56	Denver	7-10-3†	4-8-1†		
Denver:		41-30-4	19-24-2		
Total:		76-42-6			
National champion Postseason invitational champion Conference regular season champion Conference regular season and conference tournament champion Division regular season champion Division regular season and conference tournament champion Conference tournament champion

†Celley resigned shortly after removing four players from the team for violating team rules.

== Awards and honors ==
Award	Year
AHCA First Team All-American	1950–51
NCAA All-Tournament First Team	1951

Awards and achievements
Preceded by Jack Garrity	NCAA Ice Hockey Scoring Champion; 1950–51	Succeeded by Frank Chiarelli
