= Donald Whiston =

American ice hockey player (1927–2020)

Don Whiston
Biographical details
- Born: June 19, 1927; Lynn, Massachusetts, US
- Died: July 11, 2020 (aged 93); Ipswich, Massachusetts, US

Playing career
- 1948–1951: Brown
- Position: Goaltender

Coaching career (HC unless noted)
- 1952–1955: Brown

Head coaching record
- Overall: 27–27–1
Medal record
Men's Ice Hockey
Representing United States
Olympic Games
| Silver medal – second place | 1952 Oslo | Team |

Donald Francis Whiston (June 19, 1927 – July 11, 2020) was an American ice hockey player. He won a silver medal at the 1952 Winter Olympics. Afterwards he coached at Brown for three seasons.

== Head coaching record ==
Record table
| Season | Team | Overall | Conference | Standing | Postseason |
|---|---|---|---|---|---|
Brown Bears Independent (1952–1955)
| 1952–53 | Brown | 6-11-0 | | | |
| 1953–54 | Brown | 12-8-0 | | | |
| 1954–55 | Brown | 9-8-1 | | | |
| Brown: | | 27-27-1 | | | |
| Total: | | 27-27-1 | | | |
National champion Postseason invitational champion Conference regular season champion Conference regular season and conference tournament champion Division regular season champion Division regular season and conference tournament champion Conference tournament champion

== Awards and honors ==
| Award | Year |
|---|---|
| AHCA First Team All-American | 1950–51 |
| All-NCAA All-Tournament First Team | 1951 |

Awards and achievements
| Preceded by Ralph Bevins | NCAA Tournament Most Outstanding Player; 1951 | Succeeded by Ken Kinsley |
