= 1951 NCAA men's ice hockey tournament =

College ice hockey tournament

- Teams: 4
- Finals site: Broadmoor Ice Palace, Colorado Springs, Colorado
- Champions: Michigan Wolverines (2nd title)
- Runner-up: Brown Bears (1st title game)
- Semifinalists: Boston University Terriers (2nd Frozen Four); Colorado College Tigers (4th Frozen Four)
- Winning coach: Vic Heyliger (2nd title)
- MOP: Donald Whiston (Brown)
- Attendance: 10,800

The 1951 NCAA Men's Ice Hockey Tournament was the culmination of the 1950–51 NCAA men's ice hockey season, the fourth such tournament in NCAA history. It was held between March 15 and 17, 1951, and concluded with Michigan defeating Brown 7-1. All games were played at the Broadmoor Ice Palace in Colorado Springs, Colorado.

This was the last tournament to include only independent schools. (As of 2016)

== Qualifying teams ==
Four teams qualified for the tournament, two each from the eastern and western regions. The teams were selected by a committee based upon both their overall record and the strength of their opponents.

East							West						
Seed	School	Conference	Record	Berth type	Appearance	Last bid	Seed	School	Conference	Record	Berth type	Appearance	Last bid
1	Brown	Independent	17–5–0	At-Large	1st	Never	1	Michigan	Independent	20–4–1	At-Large	4th	1950
2	Boston University	Independent	15–4–0	At-Large	2nd	1950	2	Colorado College	Independent	16–6–1	At-Large	4th	1950

== Format ==
The eastern and western teams judged as better were seeded as the top regional teams. The second eastern seed was slotted to play the top western seed and vice versa. All games were played at the Broadmoor Ice Palace. All matches were Single-game eliminations with the semifinal winners advancing to the national championship game and the losers playing in a consolation game.

== Bracket ==
Semifinals; March 15–16
E1	Brown	8
W2	Colorado College	4
W1	Michigan	8
E2	Boston University	2

National championship March 17
W1	Michigan	7
E1	Brown	1
Third-place game
E2	Boston University	7
W2	Colorado College	4

Note: * denotes overtime period(s)

== Results ==
=== Semifinals ===
==== Michigan vs. Boston University ====
March 15	Michigan	8 – 2	Boston University	Broadmoor Ice Palace	Recap
(Keyes) Al Bassey - 03:16 (Celley, McKennell) John Matchefts - 08:53 (Celley) Bob Heathcott - 11:05		First period	03:49 - Ed Cahoon (unassisted)
(Matchefts) Earl Keyes - 13:05		Second period	No scoring
(Burford) John Matchefts - 01:51 (Bassey) John McKennell - 08:33 (unassisted) Joseph Marmo - 09:16 (Burford) Neil Celley - 10:04		Third period	03:00 - Dick Kelly (Martin)
Hal Downes		Goalie stats	Dick Bradley / Dick Kelly

==== Brown vs. Colorado College ====
March 16	Brown	8 – 4	Colorado College	Broadmoor Ice Palace

=== Consolation Game ===
==== Boston University vs. Colorado College ====
March 17	Boston University	7 – 4	Colorado College	Broadmoor Ice Palace
(Garrity, D. Kelley) Jack Martin - 00:38 (D. Kelley) Jack Garrity - 00:59 (Folino) Jack Kelley - 03:57 (unassisted) Ed Cahoon - 08:35 (unassisted) Jack Garrity - GW - 18:31		First period	16:22 - Omer Brandt (Fitzpatrick); 19:16 - Ron Hartwell (Brandt)
(Garrity) Dick Kelley - 12:56		Second period	No scoring
(D. Kelley) Jack Garrity - 03:25		Third period	08:26 - Andy Gambucci (Frasca); 11:06 - Leonard Maccini (Brandt)
(28 saves) Paul Kelley		Goalie stats	Ken Cush (29 saves)

=== (W1) Michigan vs. (E1) Brown ===
March 17	Michigan	7 – 1	Brown	Broadmoor Ice Palace

Scoring summary
Period	Team	Goal	Assist(s)	Time	Score
1st	UM	Eddie May	Naylor and Marmo	03:49	1–0 UM
1st	UM	Gil Burford – GW	MacLellan	15:24	2–0 UM
2nd	UM	Neil Celley	unassisted	26:41	3–0 UM
2nd	UM	John McKennell	unassisted	30:56	4–0 UM
2nd	UM	Al Bassey	Keyes and MacLellan	34:19	5–0 UM
3rd	BRN	Tony Malo	Wheeler	47:54	5–1 UM
3rd	UM	John McKennell	Burford and Keyes	51:15	6–1 UM
3rd	UM	Neil Celley	Burford	59:38	7–1 UM
Penalty summary
Period	Team	Player	Penalty	Time	PIM
1st	UM	Joe Marmo			2:00
2nd	BRN	Robert Maley			2:00
2nd	BRN	Robert Maley			2:00
3rd	UM	Bob Heathcott			2:00

Shots by period
Team	1	2	3	T
Michigan	17	21	14	52
Brown	5	4	11	20

Goaltenders
Team	Name	Saves	Goals against	Time on ice
UM	Hal Downes	19	1	
BRN	Donald Whiston	45	7	

== All-Tournament team ==
=== First Team ===
- G: Donald Whiston* (Brown)
- D: Bob Heathcott (Michigan)
- D: Jim Starrak (Colorado College)
- F: Gil Burford (Michigan)
- F: Neil Celley (Michigan)
- F: John Matchefts (Michigan)

* Most Outstanding Player(s)

=== Second Team ===
- G: Hal Downes (Michigan)
- D: Jim Sutherland (Brown)
- D: John Murphy (Brown)
- F: Jack Garrity (Boston University)
- F: Al Gubbins (Brown)
- F: Omer Brandt (Colorado College)
