= Gordon Watters =

Canadian ice hockey player and pediatric neurologist (1928–2022)

- Born: April 28, 1928 Winnipeg, Manitoba, Canada
- Died: April 4, 2022 (aged 93)
- Height: 5 ft 11 in (180 cm)
- Weight: 174 lb (79 kg; 12 st 6 lb)
- Position: Center
- Played for: Minnesota
- Playing career: 1948–1951

Gordon V. Watters (April 28, 1928 – April 4, 2022) was a Canadian pediatric neurologist who was an ice hockey center for the Minnesota Golden Gophers in the early 1950s.

== Career ==
Watters was seen as a hot commodity in hockey circles after World War II. While playing for junior team in the Winnipeg area, Watters was pursuing a medical career but in 1948 the New York Rangers were able to convince him to take a year away from his studies to play minor league hockey. He played the 1948–49 season with the San Francisco Shamrocks (not to be confused with the later team of the same name), scoring 22 points in 53 games, but after the season he decided that professional hockey was not for him. Watters returned to college to complete his degree, matriculating to the University of Minnesota where he also played on the ice hockey team. Watters played just one season with the Gophers, but he was named an AHCA First Team All-American after scoring 46 points in 22 games.

After graduating from Minnesota, Watters returned to Winnipeg and began attending Medical School. He initially began with psychology but after advise from his graduate supervisor, he switched to neurology and found his calling. Watters earned his degree from the University of Manitoba in 1956 and went back to the United States to finish his training in pediatrics, working at both the Cincinnati Children's Hospital Medical Center and the University of Chicago Medical Center, working with famed child neurologist Douglas Buchanan. After finishing his residency Watters became a member of the faculty at his alma mater, the University of Manitoba, as well as Harvard University before receiving the Directorship for the Division of Pediatric Neurology at McGill University in 1969. Watters remained as Director for 25 years and retired from his role in 1994 but remained with McGill to continue seeing patients for years after.

== Personal life and death ==
Watters had three children with his wife, Pat. He died on April 4, 2022, at the age of 93.

== Statistics ==
=== Regular season and playoffs ===
			Regular season					Playoffs
Season	Team	League	GP	G	A	Pts	PIM	GP	G	A	Pts	PIM
1946–47	Brandon Elks	MJHL	—	—	—	—	—	—	—	—	—	—
1947–48	Winnipeg Canadiens	MJHL	—	15	17	32	10	—	—	—	—	—
1948–49	San Francisco Shamrocks	PCHL	53	10	12	22	6	—	—	—	—	—
1950–51	Minnesota	NCAA	22	27	19	46	2	—	—	—	—	—
NCAA totals			22	27	19	46	2	—	—	—	—	—

== Awards and honors ==
Award	Year
AHCA First Team All-American	1950–51
