= Larry Ross (ice hockey) =

American ice hockey player and coach

- Born: April 12, 1922 Duluth, Minnesota, U.S.
- Died: May 1, 1995 (aged 73)
- Height: 5 ft 8 in (173 cm)
- Weight: 161 lb (73 kg; 11 st 7 lb)
- Position: Goaltender
- Played for: Minnesota
- Playing career: 1942–1952

Lawrence "Larry" Ross (1922-1995) was an American ice hockey goaltender and coach who played for Minnesota in the early 1950s and is a member of the United States Hockey Hall of Fame.

== Early life ==
Ross was born in Duluth, Minnesota, and graduated from Morgan Park High School in 1940. He joined the United States Navy and played for the naval ice hockey team during World War II. After the war, Ross returned to Minnesota and continued to play in amateur hockey leagues for several years before matriculating to the University of Minnesota.

Ross was a two-year starter for Minnesota, playing in 32 games from 1950 to 1952 and was an AHCA First Team All-American in 1950–51.

== Career ==
After graduating from college, Ross became the head coach at International Falls High School in 1954 and remained with the team for 31 years. In that time Ross led the team to 13 state tournaments, winning 6 Minnesota State Championships. During his tenure the team compiled a 566–169–21 record (.763) and went undefeated for three consecutive seasons from 1964 through 1966. Ross coached 12 players who reached the NHL and 8 olympians. Towards the end of his coaching career, Ross became a scout for the Hartford Whalers and wrote a book titled "Hockey for Everyone".

He was named as the Coach of the Year in 1983 by the Minnesota Hockey Coaches Association and, in his final season with International Falls, he received the National High School Special Sports award. He was inducted into the United States Hockey Hall of Fame in 1988 and received the John Mariucci College Award the same year. Upon his retirement in 1985, his Minnesota classmate Bob Johnson summed up his career: "He made a 100% commitment to his job and the sport of hockey."

== Statistics ==
=== Regular season and playoffs ===
			Regular season									Playoffs
Season	Team	League	GP	W	L	T	MIN	GA	SO	GAA	SV%	GP	W	L	MIN	GA	SO	GAA	SV%
1950–51	Minnesota	NCAA	19	—	—	—	—	78	0	4.10	—	—	—	—	—	—	—	—	—
1951–52	Minnesota	NCAA	13	—	—	—	—	64	0	4.90	.840	—	—	—	—	—	—	—	—
NCAA totals			32	—	—	—	—	142	0	—	—	—	—	—	—	—	—	—	—

== Awards and honors ==
Award	Year
AHCA First Team All-American	1950–51
US Hockey Hall of Fame	1988
Minnesota Athletic Hall of Fame	2013
