= George Chin =

Canadian ice hockey player (1929–2023)

- Born: July 28, 1929 Lucknow, Ontario, Canada
- Died: November 28, 2023 (aged 94) Calgary, Alberta, Canada
- Position: Right Wing
- Played for: Michigan
- Playing career: 1949–1955

George Edward Chin (July 28, 1929 – November 28, 2023) was a Canadian ice hockey right wing who won consecutive National Championships with Michigan.

== Career ==
Charles and Rose Chin, operators of Chin's Restaurant in Lucknow, Ontario, had fourteen children together. All eleven of their sons grew up playing hockey but three of the boys demonstrated a tremendous amount of talent. They played as a line for the Lucknow Maple Leafs with George at left wing, Bill at right wing and Albert (Abe) at centre. In September 1944 Albert (17), Bill (16) and George (15) all attended the Toronto Maple Leafs' training camp and played exhibition games for the Leafs. Despite being smaller and younger than most of the other players, the three boys had reports from the Toronto Daily Star claiming:

"They'll be ready for the big time before long."

Curiously, all three boys remained unsigned by the Leafs as well as the Detroit Red Wings, who had also shown interest. Undeterred, George and his brothers continued on with their junior careers. George became an inaugural member of the Windsor Spitfires and later was a member of the Chatham Maroons when it won the Turner Cup in 1950.

With no offers from NHL teams, Chin accepted a scholarship from Michigan and began attending classes in the fall of 1950. After a year with the freshman team, Chin became a major contributor for the defending champion Wolverines and helped the team return to the NCAA tournament. Chin led Michigan in scoring for the championship, scoring two goals and two assists as the Wolverines won their third title. His offensive punch got him a place on the NCAA All-Tournament First Team. Michigan repeated as champions in 1953, with Chin again leading the team in postseason scoring, mostly on the strength of his five points against Boston University.

In his senior season the Wolverines reached the tournament for the seventh consecutive year and were one of the favorites to win the tournament. In the semifinal against Rensselaer Chin was held scoreless for the first time in his postseason career and the Wolverines fell to the underdog Bachelors 4–6. The team destroyed their hotel room that night and then beat up Boston College in the consolation game with Chin contributing a goal and an assist. Despite the sour end, Chin ended his career as one of Michigan's top players, scoring 55 goals and 67 assists in three seasons. In six tournament games he scored 5 goals and added 7 assists for one of the best frozen four totals in NCAA history. Chin played one year of professional hockey after graduating, scoring 75 points for the Nottingham Panthers in 1954–55. After ending his playing career Chin moved to Alberta and worked in the oil industry.

Chin was inducted into the Michigan Dekers Hall of Fame in 1977 and was named as the 36th best player in the history of Michigan ice hockey in 2018.

== Pioneer ==
Chin was one of the few players of his era who was of Asian descent. Despite China having been an ally of Canada during World War II there was still a good deal of hostility that was thrown in his direction when he played junior hockey. Years later Chin would recall chants like "Kill that Chink!" when he played on the road in towns like Hanover and Goderich. Even in college he could not always escape unfounded criticism, being derisively called "As wide as he is tall." by a Colorado newspaper during the 1952 championship. Despite the vitriol, Chin became one of the earliest star Asian players of college ice hockey and would be followed by many over the years, including brothers Mel and Herb Wakabayashi, Bob Iwabuchi, Paul Kariya and Brandon Yip.

== Personal life and death ==
Chin was married to Coral Kong and had four daughters. He later settled in Calgary, Alberta and worked as a geologist. He died in Calgary on November 28, 2023, at the age of 94.

== Statistics ==
=== Regular season and playoffs ===
			Regular season					Playoffs
Season	Team	League	GP	G	A	Pts	PIM	GP	G	A	Pts	PIM
1946–47	Windsor Spitfires	OHA	9	5	5	10	4	—	—	—	—	—
1946–47	Windsor Spitfires	IHL	15	8	13	21	0	3	3	2	5	0
1949–50	Chatham Maroons	IHL	38	18	22	40	6	10	3	1	4	2
1951–52	Michigan	MCHL	26	18	19	37	10	—	—	—	—	—
1952–53	Michigan	MCHL	24	20	27	47	0	—	—	—	—	—
1953–54	Michigan	WIHL	23	23	28	50	16	—	—	—	—	—
1954–55	Nottingham Panthers	BNL	60	35	40	75	24	—	—	—	—	—
NCAA totals			73	60	74	134	26	—	—	—	—	—

== Awards and honors ==
Award	Year
NCAA All-Tournament First Team	1952
NCAA All-Tournament Second Team	1953
All-WIHL Second Team	1953–54
