= 1950–51 NCAA men's ice hockey season =

- Duration: November 1950– March 17, 1951
- NCAA tournament: 1951
- National championship: Broadmoor Ice Palace; Colorado Springs, Colorado
- NCAA champion: Michigan

The 1950–51 NCAA men's ice hockey season began in November 1950 and concluded with the 1951 NCAA Men's Ice Hockey Tournament's championship game on March 17, 1951 at the Broadmoor Ice Palace in Colorado Springs, Colorado. This was the 4th season in which an NCAA ice hockey championship was held and is the 57th year overall where an NCAA school fielded a team.

This was the first season of play for the Tri-State League. The 6-team conference was the first to formally sponsor ice hockey as a sport at any level. The Tri-State League also produced the first conference playoff game this season when Clarkson defeated Middlebury to claim the conference title. There would not be another conference playoff until the WCHA tournament began in 1960.

The American Hockey Coaches Association awarded Eddie Jeremiah the first Spencer Penrose Award as the top coach in the college game. It is named after Spencer Penrose who helped found The Broadmoor, the hotel and resort where the Ice Palace was located.

== Regular season ==
=== Season tournaments ===
Tournament	Dates	Teams	Champion
NEIHL Tournament	March 5–7	4	Boston University

=== Standings ===
1950–51 NCAA Independent ice hockey standings
	Intercollegiate							Overall					
	GP	W	L	T	Pct.	GF	GA	GP	W	L	T	GF	GA
American International	–	–	–	–	–	–	–	17	8	8	1	–	–
Army	12	1	10	1	.125	29	74	13	2	10	1	33	76
Boston College	–	–	–	–	–	–	–	20	12	8	0	105	89
Boston University	21	16	5	0	.762	149	59	21	16	5	0	149	59
Bowdoin	–	–	–	–	–	–	–	12	6	5	1	–	–
Brown	–	–	–	–	–	–	–	24	18	6	0	172	72
Colby	–	–	–	–	–	–	–	–	–	–	–	–	–
Colorado College	–	–	–	–	–	–	–	25	16	8	1	192	130
Dartmouth	–	–	–	–	–	–	–	19	9	9	1	71	89
Denver	–	–	–	–	–	–	–	23	11	11	1	134	111
Hamilton	–	–	–	–	–	–	–	16	7	9	0	–	–
Harvard	–	–	–	–	–	–	–	23	12	11	0	117	91
Lehigh	1	1	0	0	1.000	6	1	5	4	1	0	35	14
Massachusetts	–	–	–	–	–	–	–	7	0	7	0	10	40
Michigan	20	18	2	0	.900	159	69	27	22	4	1	212	100
Michigan State	–	–	–	–	–	–	–	17	6	11	0	65	95
Michigan Tech	–	–	–	–	–	–	–	21	5	14	2	89	134
Minnesota	–	–	–	–	–	–	–	26	14	12	0	140	112
MIT	–	–	–	–	–	–	–	10	0	10	0	–	–
New Hampshire	–	–	–	–	–	–	–	9	5	4	0	44	34
North Dakota	–	–	–	–	–	–	–	26	12	12	2	116	139
North Dakota Agricultural	–	–	–	–	–	–	–	–	–	–	–	–	–
Northeastern	–	–	–	–	–	–	–	19	8	11	0	90	77
Norwich	–	–	–	–	–	–	–	12	6	6	0	–	–
Princeton	–	–	–	–	–	–	–	18	7	10	1	100	111
Saint Michael's	–	–	–	–	–	–	–	6	3	3	0	33	39
St. Olaf	–	–	–	–	–	–	–	9	5	3	1	–	–
Wyoming	–	–	–	–	–	–	–	12	4	8	0	–	–
Yale	–	–	–	–	–	–	–	17	14	2	1	116	43

1950–51 Minnesota Intercollegiate Athletic Conference ice hockey standings
	Conference							Overall					
	GP	W	L	T	PTS	GF	GA	GP	W	L	T	GF	GA
Macalester †	–	–	–	–	–	–	–	–	–	–	–	–	–
St. Thomas †	–	–	–	–	–	–	–	16	12	3	1	–	–
Augsburg	–	–	–	–	–	–	–	–	–	–	–	–	–
Concordia	–	–	–	–	–	–	–	9	4	5	0	–	–
Gustavus Adolphus	–	–	–	–	–	–	–	12	5	7	0	–	–
Hamline	–	–	–	–	–	–	–	–	–	–	–	–	–
Minnesota–Duluth	5	2	3	0	.400	–	–	5	2	3	0	–	–
Saint John's	–	–	–	–	–	–	–	11	8	3	0	–	–
† indicates conference champion

1950–51 Tri-State League standings
	Conference							Overall					
	GP	W	L	T	PTS	GF	GA	GP	W	L	T	GF	GA
Clarkson†	5	4	1	0	8			15	12	2	1	106	52
Middlebury	5	4	1	0	8			15	13	2	0	–	–
St. Lawrence	5	3	2	0	6			14	8	6	0	63	44
Williams	5	2	3	0	4			13	4	9	0	–	–
Rensselaer	5	1	4	0	2	12	27	15	5	10	0	55	88
Colgate	5	1	4	0	2			9	2	7	0	19	55
† indicates conference regular season champion At the conclusion of the season Clarkson defeated Middlebury 16-3 in a playoff game and were declared the sole champion.

== 1951 NCAA Tournament ==
Semifinals; March 15–16
E1	Brown	8
W2	Colorado College	4
W1	Michigan	8
E2	Boston University	2

National championship March 17
W1	Michigan	7
E1	Brown	1
Third-place game
E2	Boston University	7
W2	Colorado College	4

Note: * denotes overtime period(s)

== Player stats ==
=== Scoring leaders ===
The following players led the league in points at the conclusion of the season.

GP = Games played; G = Goals; A = Assists; Pts = Points; PIM = Penalty minutes

Player	Class	Team	GP	G	A	Pts	PIM
Neil Celley	Senior	Michigan	27	40	39	79	–
Gil Burford	Senior	Michigan	–	37	34	71	–
Don Sennott	Junior	Brown	24	24	46	70	–
Ron Hartwell	Junior	Colorado College	25	44	18	62	–
Bill Munro	Junior	Clarkson	15	39	23	62	–
Bob Wheeler	Junior	Brown	23	33	27	60	–
Tony Frasca	Junior	Colorado College	25	32	28	60	–
Ken Johannson	Sophomore	North Dakota	26	27	32	59	29
John McKennell	Freshman	Michigan	–	35	22	57	–
Jack Garrity	Junior	Boston University	21	34	23	57	20

=== Leading goaltenders ===
The following goaltenders led the league in goals against average at the end of the regular season while playing at least 33% of their team's total minutes.

GP = Games played; Min = Minutes played; W = Wins; L = Losses; OT = Overtime/shootout losses; GA = Goals against; SO = Shutouts; SV% = Save percentage; GAA = Goals against average

Player	Class	Team	GP	Min	W	L	OT	GA	SO	SV%	GAA
Paul Cruikshank	Sophomore	Yale	-	-	-	-	-	-	-	-	2.31
Gene Delvecchio	Senior	St. Lawrence	16	960	-	-	-	62	0	-	3.87
Larry Ross	Sophomore	Minnesota	19	-	-	-	-	78	0	-	4.10
Walter Morin	Sophomore	Denver	-	-	11	-	-	-	1	.845	4.83
Rudy Lindbeck	Junior	North Dakota	26	-	12	12	2	-	0	.828	5.56
Delmar Reid	Junior	Michigan State	15	-	-	-	-	-	-	-	5.80
Ray Weinzler	Junior	Rensselaer	11	505	3	6	0	55	0	-	6.53

== Awards ==
=== NCAA ===
Award		Recipient
Spencer Penrose Award		Eddie Jeremiah, Dartmouth
Most Outstanding Player in NCAA Tournament		Donald Whiston, Brown
AHCA All-American Team
Player	Pos	Team
Larry Ross	G	Minnesota
Donald Whiston	G	Brown
Joe deBastiani	D	Michigan Tech
Bob Heathcott	D	Michigan
John Noah	D	North Dakota
Jim Starrak	D	Colorado College
Gil Burford	F	Michigan
Neil Celley	F	Michigan
Tony Frasca	F	Colorado College
Jack Garrity	F	Boston University
Clifford Harrison	F	Dartmouth
John McKennell	F	Michigan
Gordon Watters	F	Minnesota
