= Bob Heathcott =

Canadian ice hockey player

- Born: Calgary, Alberta, CAN
- Position: Defenceman
- Played for: Michigan
- Playing career: 1949–1952

Robert V. "Happy" Heathcott is a Canadian retired ice hockey Defenceman who played for Michigan in the early 1950s.

== Career ==
Heathcott played several years of junior A ice hockey in Canada before he began attending the University of Michigan in the fall of 1948. He joined the team in his sophomore season and posted good numbers for a first year defenseman. He helped Michigan reach their third consecutive tournament but the team had to settle for winning the consolation game. His play and scoring increased for the 1950–51 season and Heathcott was selected as an AHCA First Team All-American while again helping the Wolverines reach the tournament. Heathcott's final goal that season proved to be the game-winning goal in Michigan's 8-2 drubbing of Boston University (the team that had defeated them the previous season) and after dominating Brown in the following game, Michigan claimed the 1951 National Championship. Heathcott was named to the First All-Tournament Team for his efforts.

The following year was Heachcott's finest as he not only led the team to a second consecutive national championship (third overall) but also led the team in scoring, becoming the first defenseman to achieve that feat with a champion. Despite his scoring prowess as well as the team success, Heathcott was not conferred any postseason honor. He graduated in 1952 with a degree in geology and returned to Calgary to work in the oil industry.

Heathcott was inducted into the Michigan Dekers hall of fame in 1978.

== Statistics ==
=== Regular season and playoffs ===
			Regular season					Playoffs
Season	Team	League	GP	G	A	Pts	PIM	GP	G	A	Pts	PIM
1949–50	Michigan	NCAA	—	15	12	27	—	—	—	—	—	—
1950–51	Michigan	NCAA	—	12	21	33	—	—	—	—	—	—
1951–52	Michigan	MCHA	24	13	31	44	30	—	—	—	—	—
NCAA totals			—	40	64	104	—	—	—	—	—	—

== Awards and honors ==
Award	Year
AHCA First Team All-American	1950–51
NCAA All-Tournament Second Team	1951
Michigan Dekers Athletic Hall of Fame	1978
