= John McKennell =

Canadian ice hockey player and coach

- Born: February 8, 1929 Toronto, Ontario, Canada
- Died: December 14, 2009 (aged 80)
- Height: 5 ft 8 in (173 cm)
- Weight: 150 lb (68 kg; 10 st 10 lb)
- Position: Right wing
- Played for: Michigan
- Playing career: 1950–1953

John McKennell was a Canadian ice hockey Right wing and coach who played for Michigan in the early 1950s, winning three consecutive National Championships.

== Career ==
McKennell played several years of junior hockey in the Toronto area, finishing with the Toronto Marlboros before joining Vic Heyliger's team at the University of Michigan. McKennell was an instant hit with the Wolverines, helping the team reach the 1951 NCAA Tournament after scoring 50+ points in 25 games for which he was named as an AHCA First Team All-American. McKennell scored three goals and added an assist in the two tournament games to help Michigan capture their second national championship. Despite high hopes, McKennell's scoring diminished significantly in his second season with the team, he only managed 13 goals and 32 points in 24 games, though the Wolverines did just manage to earn the second western seed to return to the tournament. McKennell scored twice in the semifinal but was held off the scoresheet in the final. Despite his scoring regression, Michigan again won the championship and McKennell was named to the NCAA First All-Tournament Team.

After a poor year, McKennell was able to refocus and start his third season of college hockey with a bang; he scored 5 goals and 7 assists in the first six games of the season. Unfortunately his college career took a dark turn afterwards. After a 4–5 overtime loss to Denver in late December, McKennell was accused of having punched referee Milo Yalich three times during a dispute over Denver's overtime goal. McKennell denied hitting Yalich and claimed that he was the target of a plot by Colorado College head coach Cheddy Thompson to get even with Vic Heyliger (Yalich was the captain of CC's 1950 championship team). After receiving a notarized report from the Rocky Mountain Hockey Officials Association about the incident, Michigan Athletic Director Fritz Crisler was forced to suspend McKennell for the remainder of the season, ending his playing days for Michigan. Heyliger bemoaned the decision, particularly because there was still a question as to whether the fracas had occurred at all: "This has ruined Johnny's whole college career."

Despite going without McKennell's services for the rest of the year, Michigan went on to win their third straight championship, the only time in NCAA history a team has won three consecutive titles (as of 2020). Because he had played for the team that season McKennell was included as part of the 1953 championship team, however, due to the suspension some records do not include McKennell as a member. Regardless of how his time on the ice finished, McKennell did remain at Michigan and graduated from the school of Business Administration.

After leaving Michigan, McKennell returned to the Toronto-area and began a career with Allstate. While working for the company he also coached minor league hockey and worked as a coach and administrator for the Humber Valley hockey Association. McKennell retired from his job at Allstate after 37 years in 1992.

McKennell was inducted into the Michigan Dekers Club Hall of Fame in 1977.

== Personal ==
John and his wife Margaret were married for 56 years and had two children together, Carrie and Mark. McKennell died in 2009 at the age of 80.

== Statistics ==
=== Regular season and playoffs ===
			Regular season					Playoffs
Season	Team	League	GP	G	A	Pts	PIM	GP	G	A	Pts	PIM
1950–51	Michigan	NCAA	—	35	22	57	—	—	—	—	—	—
1951–52	Michigan	NCAA	—	15	19	34	15	—	—	—	—	—
1952–53	Michigan	NCAA	6	5	7	12	—	—	—	—	—	—
NCAA totals			—	55	48	103	—	—	—	—	—	—

== Awards and honors ==
Award	Year
AHCA First Team All-American	1950–51
NCAA All-Tournament First Team	1952
Michigan Dekers Athletic Hall of Fame	1977
