= Alex MacLellan =

Canadian ice hockey player (1930–2022)

- Born: April 30, 1930 Montreal, Quebec, Canada
- Died: March 18, 2022 (aged 91)
- Position: Defenceman
- Played for: Michigan
- Playing career: 1950–1953

Alexander Douglas MacLellan (April 30, 1930 – March 18, 2022) was a Canadian ice hockey defenceman who won three consecutive national championships with Michigan.

== Career ==
Hailing from Montreal, MacLellan was one of a slew of Canadians who played for Vic Heyliger on his powerhouse Michigan teams in the 1950s. After a year on the freshman team, MacLellan joined the varsity squad for the 1950–51 season and the team didn't miss a beat; the Wolverines finished the regular season with a record of 20–4–1 and received the top western seed. Michigan dominated the competition, winning both games by 6 goals and captured their second national championship. The following year was more of the same and the Wolverines' 20–4 mark got them the top seed once more. MacLellan scored his first postseason goal against St. Lawrence in the semifinal and the Wolverines completely shut down Colorado College in the final.

In MacLellan's senior season the Wolverines took a step back, finishing with a 15–7 record but tied for the MCHL lead, giving them a sixth consecutive tournament berth. While the offense had declined during the season, the defense was still a force to be reckoned with and, as the leader of the group, MacLellan was named as an AHCA First Team All-American. In the tournament the offense returned in full and blew the competition out of the water; Michigan scored 21 goals in two games and won their third consecutive title. MacLellan and the three other seniors on the team are the only players in the history of the NCAA to win three consecutive Division I championships (as of 2020).

MacLellan graduated from the school of Business Administration and was inducted into the Michigan Dekers Hall of Fame in 1978. In 2018 MacLellan was ranked as the 45th best player in the history of the program. MacLellan died on March 18, 2022, aged 91.

== Statistics ==
=== Regular season and playoffs ===
			Regular season					Playoffs
Season	Team	League	GP	G	A	Pts	PIM	GP	G	A	Pts	PIM
1950–51	Michigan	NCAA	27	—	—	27	—	—	—	—	—	—
1951–52	Michigan	MCHL	26	—	—	—	—	—	—	—	—	—
1952–53	Michigan	MCHL	24	—	—	—	—	—	—	—	—	—
NCAA totals			77	11	38	49	—	—	—	—	—	—

== Awards and honors ==
Award	Year
All-MCHL Second Team	1952–53
AHCA First Team All-American	1952–53
NCAA All-Tournament First Team	1953
