= NCAA men's ice hockey championship =

US collegiate sports tournament

- Current season, competition or edition: 2026 Division I Championship
- Sport: Ice hockey
- Founded: 1948
- No. of teams: 16
- Country: United States
- Most recent champions: DI - Denver Pioneers, DIII - Hamilton College
- Broadcaster: ESPN
- Website: NCAA.com

NCAA men's ice hockey championship refers to either of the two tournaments in men's ice hockey – one in Division I and one in Division III – contested by the National Collegiate Athletic Association (NCAA) since 1971. The NCAA Division II Men's Ice Hockey Tournament, contested from 1978 to 1984 and from 1993 to 1999, was discontinued due to a lack of Division II conferences sponsoring ice hockey.

- NCAA Division I men's ice hockey tournament
- NCAA Division III men's ice hockey tournament

Since 1999, the semifinals and finals for the Division I championship have been branded as the "Frozen Four", echoing the NCAA Division I men's basketball tournament's "Final Four".

The NCAA started a Women's Frozen Four beginning with the 2000–01 season.

The Hobey Baker Award ceremony, Hockey Humanitarian Award ceremony, and USCHO.com Town Hall Meeting take place annually during Frozen Four weekend.

The 2020 Championships were cancelled due to ongoing concerns over the coronavirus.

== See also ==
- List of NCAA Division I Men's Frozen Four appearances by team
- National Collegiate Women's Ice Hockey Championship
- U Sports University Cup, Canada's closest equivalent college ice hockey competition
