= 2010–11 Boston College Eagles men's ice hockey season =

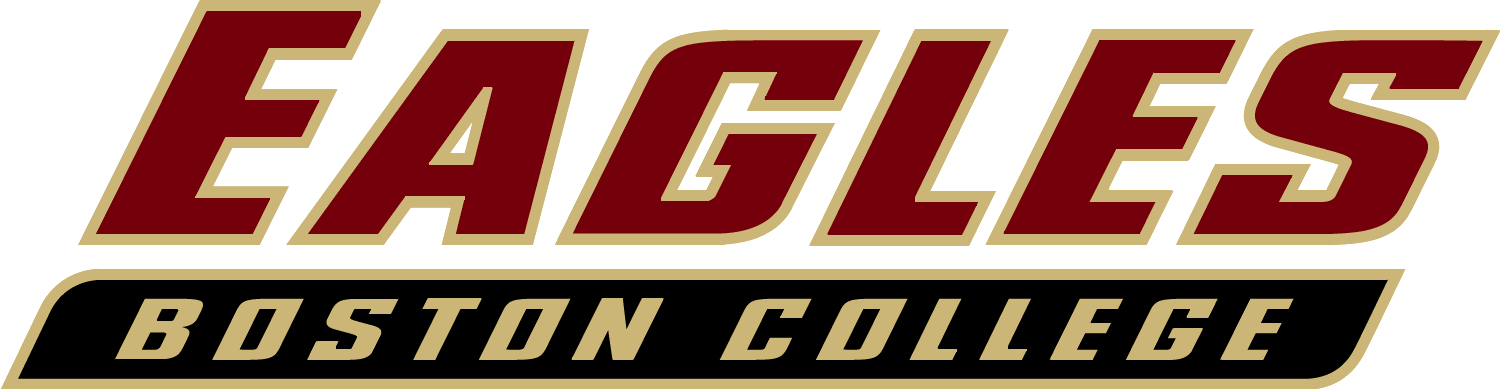

Ledyard Bank Classic, Champion Beanpot, Champion Hockey East regular season, Champion Hockey East Tournament, Champion NCAA Tournament, West Regional Semifinal
- Conference: 1st Hockey East
- Home ice: Kelley Rink

Rankings
- USA Today: #5
- USCHO.com: #5

Record
- Overall: 30–8–1
- Home: 13–1–1
- Road: 11–6–0
- Neutral: 6–1–0

Coaches and captains
- Head coach: Jerry York
- Assistant coaches: Mike Cavanaugh; Greg Brown; Jim Logue
- Captain: Joe Whitney
- Alternate captain(s): Brian Gibbons, Tommy Cross

The 2010–11 Boston College Eagles men's ice hockey team represented Boston College in the 2010–11 NCAA Division I men's ice hockey season. The team was coached by Jerry York, '67, his seventeenth season behind the bench at Boston College. The Eagles played their home games at Kelley Rink on the campus of Boston College, competing in Hockey East.

Boston College entered the 2010–2011 season as reigning National Champions, having defeated Wisconsin in the 2010 Frozen Four Championship Game. The Eagles also began the season as defending Hockey East tournament and Beanpot champions, having alo won both tournaments during the 2009–2010 season. The Eagles raised their 2010 National Championship banner in the home opener against Merrimack on October 29, 2010. BC skated to a 3–2 victory.

On February 14, 2011, BC defeated Northeastern 7–6 in overtime on a goal by junior forward Jimmy Hayes in the Beanpot Championship. It was the first time the Eagles have won back-to-back Beanpots (having also won in 2010) since the team won three-in-a-row from 1963–1965. Sophomore forward Chris Kreider was named tournament MVP.

BC clinched the Hockey East regular season crown by sweeping New Hampshire in the final series of the regular season. It was the Eagle's record eleventh Hockey East regular season title and the team's first since 2005. The Eagles also repeated as Hockey East Tournament champions, defeating Merrimack 5–3 in the tournament championship game. It was also BC's tenth Hockey Tournament Tournament title, a conference record. Junior Cam Atkinson was named tournament MVP.

The Eagles entered the 2011 NCAA Tournament as a number one seed in the West Regional played in St. Louis at the Scottrade Center. BC failed to defend their 2010 National Championship, losing in the first round to fourth-seeded Colorado College 8–4.

== Offseason ==
April 24, 2010: Freshman hockey players Parker Milner, Philip Samulesson, and Patrick Wey were involved in an accident when the SUV they were passengers in was hit by a trolley close to the South Street T-stop near Boston College. Players were treated for minor injuries.

September 13, 2010: Members of the 2009–2010 National Championship team were honored at the White House with other champion student athletes. Players visited the Walter Reed Medical Center, met with Senators Scott Brown and John Kerry of Massachusetts, and were addressed by President Barack Obama on the South Lawn.

== Recruiting ==
Boston College added four freshmen for the 2010–2011 season: Isaac MacLeod, a Canadian defenseman who previously played for Penticton Vees in the BCHL; Patrick Brown, a forward from Michigan who is the nephew of BC assistant coach Greg Brown; Needham-born forward Bill Arnold, who captured a gold medal with the USA U-18 team at the 2010 IIHF World U18 Championships in Minsk, Belarus; and Kevin Hayes of Dorchester, MA, a first round pick of the Chicago Blackhawks in the 2010 NHL entry draft and younger brother of junior forward Jimmy Hayes. A fifth recruit, Cody Ferriero, decommitted in August and chose instead to play hockey at Northeastern.

Player	Position	Nationality	Notes
Isaac MacLeod	Defense	Canada	Nelson, BC; Selected 136th overall by SJS in 2010 draft.
Kevin Hayes	Forward	United States	Dorchester, MA; Selected 24th overall by CHI in 2010 draft.
Patrick Brown	Forward	United States	Bloomfield Hills, MI; nephew of BC assistant coach Greg Brown.
Bill Arnold	Forward	United States	Needham, MA; Selected 108th overall by CAL in 2010 draft.

== 2010–2011 Roster ==
=== Departures from 2009–2010 Team ===
- Ben Smith F – Graduation
- Matt Price, F – Graduation
- Matt Lombardi, F – Graduation
- Carl Sneep, D – Graduation
- Malcolm Lyles, D – Currently playing with the Vernon Vipers of the BCHL

=== 2010–2011 Eagles ===
As of September 14, 2010

Goaltenders
#	State	Player (Draft)	Catches	Year	Hometown	Previous team
1	(Massachusetts)	John Muse	L	Senior	East Falmouth, Massachusetts	Nobles (USHS-MA)
30	(Massachusetts)	Chris Venti	L	Junior	Needham, Massachusetts	Buckingham Browne & Nichols (USHS-MA)
35	(Pennsylvania)	Parker Milner	L	Sophomore	Pittsburgh, Pennsylvania	Waterloo (USHL)

Defensemen
#	State	Player (Draft)	Shoots	Year	Hometown	Previous team
2	(Maine)	Brian Dumoulin (CAR, 51st overall 2009)	L	Sophomore	Biddeford, Maine	New Hampshire (EJHL)
4	(Connecticut)	Tommy Cross – A (BOS, 35th overall 2007)	L	Junior	Simsbury, Connecticut	Westminster School (USHS-CT)
5	(Arizona)	Philip Samuelsson (PIT, 61st overall 2009)	L	Sophomore	Scottsdale, Arizona	Chicago (USHL)
6	(Pennsylvania)	Patrick Wey (WAS, 115th overall 2009)	R	Sophomore	Pittsburgh, Pennsylvania	Waterloo (USHL)
7	(British Columbia)	Isaac MacLeod (SJS, 136th overall 2010)	L	Freshman	Nelson, British Columbia	Penticton (BCHL)
8	(Massachusetts)	Edwin Shea	R	Junior	Shrewsbury, Massachusetts	Boston (EJHL)
27	(New York (state))	Patch Alber	R	Sophomore	Clifton Park, New York	Boston (EJHL)

Forwards
#	State	Player (Draft)	Shoots	Year	Hometown	Previous team
9	(Massachusetts)	Barry Almeida	L	Junior	Springfield, Massachusetts	Omaha (USHL)
10	(Massachusetts)	Jimmy Hayes (TOR, 60th overall 2008)	R	Junior	Dorchester, Massachusetts	Lincoln (USHL)
11	(Connecticut)	Pat Mullane	L	Sophomore	Wallingford, Connecticut	Omaha (USHL)
12	(Massachusetts)	Kevin Hayes (CHI, 24th overall 2010)	R	Freshman	Dorchester, Massachusetts	Nobles (USHS-MA)
13	(Connecticut)	Cam Atkinson (CBJ, 157th overall 2008)	R	Junior	Greenwich, Connecticut	Avon Old Farms (USHS-CT)
14	(Colorado)	Brooks Dyroff	R	Sophomore	Boulder, Colorado	Phillips Andover (USHS-MA)
15	(Massachusetts)	Joe Whitney – C	L	Senior	Reading, Massachusetts	Lawrence Academy (USHS-MA)
17	(Massachusetts)	Brian Gibbons – A	L	Senior	Braintree, Massachusetts	Salisbury School (USHS-CT)
19	(Massachusetts)	Chris Kreider (NYR, 19th overall 2009)	L	Sophomore	Boxford, Massachusetts	Phillips Andover (USHS-MA)
21	(Massachusetts)	Steven Whitney	R	Sophomore	Reading, Massachusetts	Lawrence Academy (USHS-MA)
22	(Massachusetts)	Paul Carey (COL, 135th overall 2007)	L	Junior	Weymouth, Massachusetts	Indiana (USHL)
23	(Michigan)	Patrick Brown	R	Freshman	Bloomfield Hills, Michigan	Cranbrook Kingswood (USHS-MA)
24	(Massachusetts)	Bill Arnold (CAL, 108th overall 2010)	R	Freshman	Needham, Massachusetts	USA Under-18 Team (USHL)
28	(Connecticut)	Tommy Atkinson	L	Junior	Greenwich, Connecticut	Avon Old Farms (USHS-CT)

== Standings ==
- On September 29, the Eagles were selected as the preseason favorite to win the league regular-season title in Hockey East Coach's Poll.

2010–11 Hockey East standings
	Conference							Overall					
	GP	W	L	T	PTS	GF	GA	GP	W	L	T	GF	GA
#5 Boston College†*	27	20	6	1	41	101	58	39	30	8	1	153	94
#9 New Hampshire	27	17	6	4	38	90	59	39	22	11	6	131	98
#17 Boston University	27	15	6	6	36	76	67	39	19	12	8	116	112
#10 Merrimack	27	16	8	3	35	89	67	39	25	10	4	143	97
#19 Maine	27	14	8	5	33	92	73	36	17	12	7	122	105
Northeastern	27	10	10	7	27	73	69	38	14	16	8	108	104
Vermont	27	6	14	7	19	60	85	36	8	20	8	82	116
Massachusetts	27	5	16	6	16	68	88	35	6	23	6	88	122
Providence	27	4	16	7	15	53	94	34	8	18	8	75	116
Massachusetts–Lowell	27	4	21	2	10	60	102	34	5	25	4	83	136
Championship: Boston College Eagles † indicates conference regular season champion * indicates conference tournament champion Rankings: USCHO.com/CBS College Sports Top 20 Poll

== Schedule ==
=== 2010–2011 Regular season ===
Date	Rank	Opponent	Time	Score	Rink
Oct. 3	#1	vs. Toronto (exhib.)	4:00 p.m.	W 8–0	Kelley Rink
Oct. 9	#1	at Northeastern*	7:00 p.m.	W 2–0	Matthews Arena
Oct. 15	#1	at #6 Denver	9:30 p.m.	W 6–2	Magness Arena
Oct. 16	#1	at #6 Denver	9:00 p.m.	W 3–0	Magness Arena
Oct. 23	#1	at #17 Notre Dame	7:00 p.m.	L 2–1	Joyce Center
Oct. 29	#2	vs. Merrimack*	7:00 p.m.	W 3–2	Kelley Rink
Oct. 30	#2	at Merrimack*	7:00 p.m.	L 4–2	Lawler Arena
Nov. 2	#4	vs. UMass Lowell*	7:00 p.m.	W 5–2	Kelley Rink
Nov. 5	#4	vs. #10 New Hampshire*	7:00 p.m.	L 2–1	Kelley Rink
Nov. 12	#7	at Vermont*	7:00 p.m.	W 3–2	Gutterson Fieldhouse
Nov. 13	#7	at Vermont*	7:00 p.m.	L 5–3	Gutterson Fieldhouse
Nov. 19	#10	vs. #3 Maine*	7:00 p.m.	W 4–0	Kelley Rink
Nov. 21	#10	vs. #3 Maine*	1:00 p.m.	W 4–1	Kelley Rink
Nov. 26	#7	at #18 Merrimack*	4:00 p.m.	L 5–3	Lawler Arena
Nov. 28	#7	vs. Vermont*	4:00 p.m.	W 6–0	Kelley Rink
Dec. 3	#8	at #2 Boston University* (Green Line Rivalry)	7:30 p.m.	W 9–5	Agganis Arena
Dec. 4	#8	vs. #2 Boston University* (Green Line Rivalry)	7:30 p.m.	W 5–2	Kelley Rink
Dec. 30	#5	vs. Colgate %	4:00 p.m.	W 6–5	Thompson Arena
Dec. 31	#5	vs. Mercyhurst %^{Champ.}	7:00 p.m.	W 4–1	Thompson Arena
Jan. 7	#3	vs. Providence*	7:30 p.m.	W 4–1	Kelley Rink
Jan. 8	#3	at Providence*	7:00 p.m.	W 3–1	Schneider Arena
Jan. 16	#3	at #13 Maine*	7:00 p.m.	L 4–1	Alfond Arena
Jan. 21	#3	at #15 Boston University* (Green Live Rivalry)	7:30 p.m.	W 3–2	Agganis Arena
Jan. 22	#3	vs. UMass Lowell*	7:00 p.m.	W 5–3	Kelley Rink
Jan. 29	#2	at UMass Lowell*	7:00 p.m.	W 5–1	Tsongas Center
Feb. 4	#1	vs. Massachusetts*	7:00 p.m.	W 5–0	Kelley Rink
Feb. 7	#1	vs. #14 Boston University^{Beanpot} (Green Line Rivalry)	8:00 p.m.	W 3–2 (OT)	TD Garden
Feb. 11	#1	at Providence*	7:00 p.m.	W 3–0	Schneider Arena
Feb. 14	#1	vs. Northeastern^{Beanpot Champ.}	7:30 p.m.	W 7–6 (OT)	TD Garden
Feb. 18	#1	vs. Northeastern*	7:00 p.m.	T 7–7	Kelley Rink
Feb. 19	#1	at Northeastern*	7:30 p.m.	L 2–1	Matthews Arena
Feb. 25	#2	at Massachusetts*	7:00 p.m.	W 4–3	Mullins Center
Feb. 26	#2	vs. Massachusetts*	7:00 p.m.	W 2–1	Kelley Rink
Mar. 4	#2	vs. #7 New Hampshire*	7:30 p.m.	W 4–0	Kelley Rink
Mar. 5	#2	at #7 New Hampshire*	7:00 p.m.	W 4–3	Whittemore Center

All times Eastern
Rankings from USCHO.com/CBS College Sports Poll
* = Hockey East Conference Play
% = 2010 Ledyard National Bank Classic in Hanover, NH
^{Beanpot} = 59th Annual Beanpot Tournament in Boston, MA

- On December 7, sophomores Chris Kreider, Philip Samuelsson, Brian Dumoulin, and Patrick Wey were named 29-man preliminary roster for the 2011 United States Junior National Team.
- On December 22, sophomores Chris Kreider, Brian Dumoulin, and Patrick Wey were selected to the final 22-man roster for the 2011 United States Junior National Team to compete at the 2011 World Junior Ice Hockey Championships from December 26, 2010 to Jan. 5, 2011, in Buffalo and Niagara, New York.
- On January 22, Jerry York notched his 400th win as Boston College head coach, and 867th overall, with a 5–3 victory over UMass Lowell at Kelley Rink.
- On February 14, BC won its sixteenth Beanpot title by defeating Northeastern 7–6 in overtime of the championship game.
- On February 18, BC clinched home ice for the quarterfinal round of the Hockey East playoffs with a 7–7 tie versus Northeastern.
- On March 5, in the final game of the regular season versus New Hampshire, the Eagles won 4–3 at the Whittemore Center to win its record eleventh Hockey East regular season championship and the school's first since 2005.

=== 2011 Post-Season ===
Date	Opponent	Time	Score	Rink
Mar. 11	vs. Massachusetts; Hockey East Quarterfinals	7:00 p.m.	W 4–1	Kelley Rink
Mar. 12	vs. Massachusetts; Hockey East Quarterfinals	7:00 p.m.	W 4–2	Kelley Rink
Mar. 18	vs. Northeastern; Hockey East Semifinals – Boston, MA	5:00 p.m.	W 5–4	TD Garden
Mar. 19	vs. Merrimack; Hockey East Championship – Boston, MA	7:00 p.m.	W 5–3	TD Garden
Mar. 25	vs. Colorado College; NCAA West Regional semifinal – St. Louis, MO	9:00 p.m.	L 8–4	Scottrade Center

All times Eastern

- On March 12, the senior class of Joe Whitney, Brian Gibbons, and John Muse recorded their 100th career win in defeating Massachusetts 4–2 in the Hockey East tournament quarterfinals, the trio's final game at Kelley Rink.
- On March 19, the Eagles won their league-record tenth Hockey East Tournament title by defeating Merrimack 5–3 in the final.

== Awards and honors ==
2010 Lester Patrick Trophy Recipient

- Jerry York

2010–11 Norman F. Dailey Team MVP

- Cam Atkinson, F (shared)
- John Muse, G (shared)

2010–11 John "Snooks" Kelley Memorial Award

- Brian Gibbons, F

William J. Flynn Coaches Award

- Joe Whitney, F

Parker-York Award

- Jim Logue

ACHA All-Americans

- Brian Dumoulin, D (First team)
- Cam Atkinson, F (First team)
- John Muse, G (Second team)

All-USCHO Teams

- Brian Dumoulin, D (First team)
- Cam Atkinson, F (First team)
- John Muse, G (Second team)

2011 Walter Brown Award

- John Muse, G

2011 Hockey Humanitarian Award

- Brooks Dyroff, F

Beanpot MVP

- Chris Kreider, F

2011 Hockey East Tournament MVP

- Cam Atkinson, F

2011 Hockey East All-Tournament Team

- John Muse, G
- Tommy Cross, D
- Brian Gibbons, F
- Cam Atkinson, F

2010–11 Hockey East Coach of the Year

- Jerry York

2010–11 Hockey East First-Team All-Stars

- John Muse, G
- Brian Dumoulin, D
- Cam Atkinson, F

2010–11 Hockey East Second-Team All-Stars

- Brian Gibbons, F

2010–11 Hockey East Best Defensive Defenseman

- Brian Dumoulin

2010–11 Hockey East Goaltending Champion

- John Muse – 1.84 GAA, .933 save%

2010–11 Hockey East All-Rookie Team

- Bill Arnold, F

2010–11 Hockey East Academic All-Stars

- Isaac Macleod, D
- Patrick Wey, D
- Bill Arnold, F
- Patrick Brown, F
- Brooks Dyroff, F

Hockey East Player of the Month

- Brian Gibbons, F – December 2010 Archived January 26, 2011, at the Wayback Machine
- Cam Atkinson, F – March 2011 Archived May 16, 2011, at the Wayback Machine (Shared with Ryan Flanigan, F, Merrimack)

Hockey East Goaltender of the Month

- John Muse – November 2010 Archived January 26, 2011, at the Wayback Machine

Hockey East Team of the Week

- Week of October 18, 2010 Archived January 26, 2011, at the Wayback Machine
- Week of November 22, 2010 Archived January 26, 2011, at the Wayback Machine
- Week of December 6, 2010 Archived January 26, 2011, at the Wayback Machine
- Week of January 3, 2011 Archived January 10, 2011, at the Wayback Machine
- Week of January 24, 2011 Archived May 16, 2011, at the Wayback Machine
- Week of March 7, 2011 Archived May 16, 2011, at the Wayback Machine
- Week of March 21, 2011 Archived May 16, 2011, at the Wayback Machine

Hockey East Player of the Week

- Jimmy Hayes, F – Week of October 18, 2010 Archived January 26, 2011, at the Wayback Machine, Week of March 14, 2011 Archived May 16, 2011, at the Wayback Machine (shared with Ryan Flanigan, F, Merrimack)
- Steven Whitney, F – Week of December 6, 2010 Archived January 26, 2011, at the Wayback Machine (shared with Mike Sislo, F, New Hampshire)
- Cam Atkinson, F – Week of March 7, 2011 Archived May 16, 2011, at the Wayback Machine, Week of March 21, 2011 Archived May 16, 2011, at the Wayback Machine

Hockey East Defensive Player of the Week

- John Muse, G – Week of October 11, 2010 Archived January 26, 2011, at the Wayback Machine, Week of November 22, 2010 Archived January 26, 2011, at the Wayback Machine, Week of February 14, 2011 Archived February 17, 2011, at the Wayback Machine
- Brian Dumoulin, D – Week of January 10, 2011 Archived February 4, 2011, at the Wayback Machine (shared with Joe Cannata, G, Merrimack)
- Tommy Cross, D – Week of March 21, 2011 Archived May 16, 2011, at the Wayback Machine

Hockey East Rookie of the Week

- Bill Arnold, F – Week of January 3, 2011 Archived January 10, 2011, at the Wayback Machine

== See also ==
- 2010–11 Boston College Eagles women's ice hockey season
