= 2011 NCAA Division I men's ice hockey tournament =

- 2011 Frozen Four logo
- Teams: 16
- Finals site: Xcel Energy Center, St. Paul, Minnesota
- Champions: Minnesota–Duluth Bulldogs (1st title)
- Runner-up: Michigan Wolverines (16th title game)
- Semifinalists: Notre Dame Fighting Irish (2nd Frozen Four); North Dakota Fighting Sioux (19th Frozen Four)
- Winning coach: Scott Sandelin (1st title)
- MOP: J. T. Brown (Minnesota–Duluth)
- Attendance: 19,222 (Championship); 57,500 (Frozen Four); 129,513 (Tournament)

The 2011 NCAA Division I men's ice hockey tournament involved 16 schools in single-elimination play to determine the national champion of men's NCAA Division I college ice hockey. The tournament began on March 25, 2011, and ended with the championship game on April 9, when the Minnesota–Duluth Bulldogs defeated the Michigan Wolverines 3–2.

The championship game required overtime for the fourteenth time in NCAA history, and the second time in three years (2009).

== Tournament procedure ==
2011 Regionals (blue) and Frozen Four (red)

The four regionals are officially named after their geographic areas. The following are the sites for the 2011 regionals:

March 25 and 26
East Regional, Webster Bank Arena – Bridgeport, Connecticut (Hosts: Yale University and Fairfield University)
West Regional, Scottrade Center – St. Louis, Missouri (Host: Central Collegiate Hockey Association)

March 26 and 27
Northeast Regional, Verizon Wireless Arena – Manchester, New Hampshire (Host: University of New Hampshire)
Midwest Regional, Resch Center – Green Bay, Wisconsin (Host: Michigan Technological University)

April 7 and 9
Xcel Energy Center – St. Paul, Minnesota (Host: University of Minnesota)

== Qualifying teams ==
The at-large bids and seeding for each team in the tournament were announced on March 20. The Central Collegiate Hockey Association (CCHA) and Western Collegiate Hockey Association (WCHA), Hockey East, ECAC Hockey and Atlantic Hockey conference tournament winners all secure a spot in the tournament while other at large teams are chosen by the NCAA selection committee.

| East Regional – Bridgeport | | | | | | Midwest Regional – Green Bay | | | | | |
| Seed | School | Conference | Record | Berth type | Last Bid | Seed | School | Conference | Record | Berth type | Last Bid |
|---|---|---|---|---|---|---|---|---|---|---|---|
| 1 | Yale (1) | ECAC Hockey | 27–6–1 | Tournament champion | 2010 | 1 | North Dakota (2) | WCHA | 30–8–3 | Tournament champion | 2010 |
| 2 | Union | ECAC Hockey | 26–9–4 | At-large bid | Never | 2 | Denver | WCHA | 24–11–5 | At-large bid | 2010 |
| 3 | Minnesota–Duluth | WCHA | 22–10–6 | At-large bid | 2009 | 3 | Western Michigan | CCHA | 19–12–10 | At-large bid | 1996 |
| 4 | Air Force | Atlantic Hockey | 20–11–6 | Tournament champion | 2009 | 4 | Rensselaer | ECAC Hockey | 20–12–5 | At-large bid | 1995 |
| West Regional – St. Louis | | | | | | Northeast Regional – Manchester | | | | | |
| Seed | School | Conference | Record | Berth type | Last Bid | Seed | School | Conference | Record | Berth type | Last Bid |
| 1 | Boston College (3) | Hockey East | 30–7–1 | Tournament champion | 2010 | 1 | Miami (4) | CCHA | 23–9–6 | Tournament champion | 2010 |
| 2 | Michigan | CCHA | 26–10–4 | At-large bid | 2010 | 2 | Merrimack | Hockey East | 25–9–4 | At-large bid | 1988 |
| 3 | Nebraska–Omaha | WCHA | 21–15–2 | At-large bid | 2006 | 3 | Notre Dame | CCHA | 23–13–5 | At-large bid | 2009 |
| 4 | Colorado College | WCHA | 22–18–3 | At-large bid | 2008 | 4 | New Hampshire | Hockey East | 21–10–6 | At-large bid | 2010 |

Number in parentheses denotes overall seed in the tournament.

== Brackets ==
Regional Semifinals; March 25–26
1 | Yale (1) | 2*
4 | Air Force | 1
East – Bridgeport – Fri/Sat
2 | Union | 0
3 | Minnesota–Duluth | 2
1 | Miami (4) | 1
4 | New Hampshire | 3
Northeast – Manchester – Sat/Sun
2 | Merrimack | 3
3 | Notre Dame | 4*
1 | North Dakota (2) | 6
4 | Rensselaer | 0
Midwest – Green Bay – Sat/Sun
2 | Denver | 3**
3 | Western Michigan | 2
1 | Boston College (3) | 4
4 | Colorado College | 8
West – St. Louis – Fri/Sat
2 | Michigan | 3*
3 | Nebraska–Omaha | 2

Regional Finals; March 26–27
1 | Yale (1) | 3
3 | Minnesota–Duluth | 5
4 | New Hampshire | 1
3 | Notre Dame | 2
1 | North Dakota (2) | 6
2 | Denver | 1
4 | Colorado College | 1
2 | Michigan | 2

National Semifinals; April 7
E3 | Minnesota–Duluth | 4
NE3 | Notre Dame | 3
MW1 | North Dakota (2) | 0
W2 | Michigan | 2

National Championship; April 9
E3 | Minnesota–Duluth | 3*
W2 | Michigan | 2

Number in parentheses denotes overall seed in the tournament
(*) denotes overtime period(s)

== Results ==
=== East Regional – Bridgeport, Connecticut ===
==== Regional Semifinals ====
| March 25, 2011; 6:30 pm EDT | (1) Yale | 2–1 (OT) (0–0, 1–1, 0–0, 1–0) | (4) Air Force | Webster Bank Arena; Attendance: 7,671 |

Game reference

Ryan Rondeau
Goalies
Jason Torf
Referees:
Brian Hill
Brian Aaron
Linesmen:
T.J. Likens
Tony Molina

| (Jaskowiak) Brian O'Neill – 37:28 | 1 – 0 |
| | 1 – 1 | 38:34 – Sean Bertsch (Walsh, Kozlak) |
| Chad Zeigler (Jaskowiak, Mason) – GW – 63:16 | 2 – 1 |

6 min
Penalties
6 min
28
Shots
23

| March 25, 2011; 3:00 pm EDT | (2) Union | 0–2 (0–1, 0–0, 0–1) | (3) Minnesota–Duluth | Webster Bank Arena; Attendance: 7,671 |

Game reference
| Keith Kinkaid | Goalies | Kenny Reiter | Referees: Scott Hansen; Tim Benedetto; Linesmen: Chris Milea; Brendan Kelleher |
| 0 – 1 / 14:38 – GW PP – Kyle Schmidt (Montgomery, Seidel); 0 – 2 / 46:24 – PP – Justin Fontaine (Faulk, Brown) | | | Referees: Scott Hansen; Tim Benedetto; Linesmen: Chris Milea; Brendan Kelleher |
| 16 min | Penalties | 18 min | Referees: Scott Hansen; Tim Benedetto; Linesmen: Chris Milea; Brendan Kelleher |
| 32 | Shots | 28 | Referees: Scott Hansen; Tim Benedetto; Linesmen: Chris Milea; Brendan Kelleher |

==== Regional Final ====
| March 26, 2011; 6:30 pm EDT | (1) Yale | 3–5 (0–1, 1–4, 2–0) | (3) Minnesota–Duluth | Webster Bank Arena; Attendance: 7,816 |

Game reference

(out 40:00) Ryan Rondeau
(in 40:00) Nick Maricic
Goalies
Kenny Reiter
Referees:
Brian Hill
Brian Aaron
Linesmen:
T.J. Likens
Tony Molina

| | 0 – 1 | 18:00 – SH – Mike Connolly (Fontaine) |
| | 0 – 2 | 22:58 – Wade Bergman (J. Connolly) |
| | 0 – 3 | 29:29 – PP – Jack Connolly(M. Connolly, Faulk) |
| (Little) Brian O'Neill – PP – 31:30 | 1 – 3 |
| | 1 – 4 | 31:58 – GW PP – Mike Seidel (M. Connolly, J. Connolly) |
| | 1 – 5 | 33:10 – PP – Justin Fontaine (M. Connolly, Faulk) |
| (Kearney, Limbert) Broc Little – PP – 48:28 | 2 – 5 |
| (Martin, Little) Denny Kearney – PP – 53:05 | 3 – 5 |

29 min
Penalties
16 min
33
Shots
26

=== Midwest Regional – Green Bay, Wisconsin ===
==== Regional Semifinals ====
| March 26, 2011; 12:30 pm CDT | (1) North Dakota | 6–0 (1–0, 4–0, 1–0) | (4) Rensselaer | Resch Center; Attendance: 4,297 |

Game reference

Aaron Dell
Goalies
Allen York
Referees:
Steve Marofsky
Ryan Sweeney
Linesmen:
Brendan Blanchard
Tory Carsano

| (Trupp, Frattin) Brad Malone – GW – 05:25 | 1 – 0 |
| (Trupp, Knight) Brad Malone – 23:58 | 2 – 0 |
| (Lamoureux, Blood) Danny Kristo – 28:03 | 3 – 0 |
| (Genoway, Kristo) Jason Gregoire – PP – 33:39 | 4 – 0 |
| (Hextall) Corban Knight – SH – 37:17 | 5 – 0 |
| (Trupp, Genoway) Matt Frattin – 40:32 | 6 – 0 |

14 min
Penalties
16 min
40
Shots
21

| March 26, 2011; 4:00 pm CDT | (2) Denver | 3–2 (2OT) (0–0, 0–1, 2–1, 0–0, 1–0) | (3) Western Michigan | Resch Center; Attendance: 4,355 |

Game reference

Sam Brittain
Goalies
Jerry Kuhn
Referees:
Kevin Shea
Jeff Bunyan
Linesmen:
Bob Bernard
Chris Aughe

| | 0–1 | 33:17 – Derek Roehl (Warda, O'Kane) |
| | 0–2 | 43:32 – Trevor Elias (Squires) |
| (Zucker, Makowski) Kyle Ostrow – PP – 55:31 | 1–2 |
| (Zucker, Shore) Matt Donovan – 57:24 | 2–2 |
| (Salazar, Donovan) Jason Zucker – GW – 91:14 | 3–2 |

10 min
Penalties
14 min
32
Shots
38

==== Regional Final ====
| March 27, 2011; 4:30 pm CDT | (1) North Dakota | 6–1 (1–1, 2–0, 3–0) | (2) Denver | Resch Center; Attendance: 3,956 |

Game reference

Aaron Dell
Goalies
Sam Brittain
Referees:
Kevin Shea
Jeff Bunyan
Linesmen:
Bob Bernard
Chris Aughe

| (Genoway) Mario Lamoureux – SH – 14:37 | 1 – 0 |
| | 1 – 1 | 19:59 – Jason Zucker (Salazar, Makowski) |
| (Frattin, Malone) Evan Trupp – GW – 27:06 | 2 – 1 |
| (Genoway, Nelson) Brett Hextall – PP – 39:07 | 3 – 1 |
| (Kristo, Davidson) Brock Nelson – 54:43 | 4 – 1 |
| (Genoway, MacWilliam) Brad Malone – EN – 57:11 | 5 – 1 |
| (Hextall, Gregoire) Jake Marto – PP – 58:21 | 6 – 1 |

8 min
Penalties
14 min
32
Shots
27

=== West Regional – St. Louis, Missouri ===
==== Regional Semifinals ====
| March 25, 2011; 8:00 pm CDT | (1) Boston College | 4–8 (1–4, 1–3, 2–1) | (4) Colorado College | Scottrade Center; Attendance: 5,024 |

Game reference

(out 40:00) John Muse
(in 40:00) Parker Milner
Goalies
Joe Howe
Referees:
S. McInchak
B. Poch
Linesmen:
Joe Hutek
Marc DesRosiers

| (Mullane, Kreider) Jimmy Hayes – 00:19 | 1 – 0 |
| | 1 – 1 | 04:34 – PP – Stephen Schultz (R. Schwartz, J. Schwartz) |
| | 1 – 2 | 07:47 – Jaden Schwartz (R. Schwartz, Schultz) |
| | 1 – 3 | 08:02 – Rylan Schwartz (J. Schwartz) |
| | 1 – 4 | 18:42 – SH – David Civitarese (unassisted) |
| (Frattin, Malone) Paul Carey – 30:39 | 2 – 4 |
| | 2 – 5 | 34:00 – GW PP – Jaden Schwartz (R. Schwartz, Dineen) |
| | 2 – 6 | 35:34 – SH – Alexander Krushelnyski (Civitarese) |
| | 2 – 7 | 37:33 – William Rapuzzi (Hall) |
| (Gibbons, Samuelsson) Cam Atkinson – 48:15 | 3 – 7 |
| (Alber, Arnold) Barry Almeida – 53:39 | 4 – 7 |
| | 4 – 8 | 19:51 – PP – William Rapuzzi (unassisted) |

8 min
Penalties
10 min
43
Shots
36

| March 25, 2011; 4:30 pm CDT | (2) Michigan | 3–2 (OT) (0–2, 2–0, 0–0, 1–0) | (3) Nebraska–Omaha | Scottrade Center; Attendance: 5,024 |

Game reference

Shawn Hunwick
Goalies
John Faulkner
Referees:
Harry Dumas
Chip McDonald
Linesmen:
Glen Cooke
Justin Prusak

| | 0 – 1 | 01:35 – SH – Rich Purslow (Martin, Young) |
| | 0 – 2 | 08:18 – Alex Hudson (Walters, Montpetit) |
| (Vaughan, Merrill) Louie Caporusso – PP – 21:17 | 1 – 2 |
| (Langlais, Caporusso) Kevin Lynch – 28:36 | 2 – 2 |
| (Pateryn, Treais) Kevin Lynch – GW – 62:35 | 3 – 2 |

12 min
Penalties
12 min
37
Shots
29

==== Regional Final ====
| March 26, 2011; 8:00 pm CDT | (2) Michigan | 2 – 1 (2–0, 0–0, 0–1) | (4) Colorado College | Scottrade Center |

Game reference

Shawn Hunwick
Goalies
Joe Howe
Referees:
Harry Dumas
Chip McDonald
Linesmen:
Justin Prusak
Glen Cooke

| (Moffie, Clare) Scooter Vaughan – 02:23 | 1 – 0 |
| (unassisted) Lee Moffie – GW PP – 17:33 | 2 – 0 |
| | 2 – 1 | 56:25 – PP – Rylan Schwartz (J. Schwartz, Guentzel) |

14 min
Penalties
14 min
43
Shots
22

=== Northeast Regional – Manchester, New Hampshire ===
==== Regional Semifinals ====
| March 26, 2011; 4:00 pm EDT | (1) Miami | 1 – 3 (1–1, 0–0, 0–2) | (4) New Hampshire | Verizon Wireless Arena; Attendance: 7,608 |

Game reference

Cody Reichard
Goalies
Matt DiGirolamo
Referees:
Tim Kotyra
Peter Feola
Linesmen:
Mike Emanatian
Dave Brown

| (Camper, Hirschfeld) Bryon Paulazzo – 00:53 | 1 – 0 |
| | 1 – 1 | 01:53 – Kevin Goumas (Campanale, Kipp) |
| | 1 – 2 | 40:39 – GW – Mike Sislo (Kessel, DeSimone) |
| | 1 – 3 | 58:35 – EN – Kevin Goumas (Beck) |

6 min
Penalties
8 min
22
Shots
27

| March 26, 2011; 7:30 pm EDT | (2) Merrimack | 3 – 4 (OT) (2–1, 1–1, 0–1, 0–1) | (3) Notre Dame | Verizon Wireless Arena; Attendance: 7,608 |

Game reference

Joe Cannata
Goalies
Mike Johnson
Referees:
Derek Shepperd
Marco Hunt
Linesmen:
Tony Czech
Nathan Freeman

| (Flanigan, Heywood) Kyle Bigos – PP – 13:23 | 1 – 0 |
| (Da Costa) Ryan Flanigan – SH – 16:00 | 2 – 0 |
| | 2 – 1 | 16:27 – PP – Calle Ridderwall (Maday, Tynan) |
| (Bates) Rhett Bly – 22:58 | 3 – 1 |
| | 3 – 2 | 33:29 – Anders Lee (Rust) |
| | 3 – 3 | 45:32 – Billy Maday (unassisted) |
| | 3 – 4 | 65:18 – GW – Anders Lee (unassisted) |

12 min
Penalties
10 min
35
Shots
37

==== Regional Final ====
| March 27, 2011; 8:00 pm EDT | (3) Notre Dame | 2 – 1 (1–0, 1–0, 0–1) | (4) New Hampshire | Verizon Wireless Arena; Attendance: 5,906 |

Game reference

Mike Johnson
Goalies
Matt DiGirolamo
Referees:
Derek Shepperd
Marco Hunt
Linesmen:
Tony Czech
Nathan Freeman

| (Sheahan, Lee) Stephen Johns – 07:26 | 1 – 0 |
| (Sheahan) Billy Maday – GW – 39:55 | 2 – 0 |
| | 2 – 1 | 53:37 – Mike Sislo (Campanale, Kipp) |

6 min
Penalties
4 min
38
Shots
38

=== Frozen Four – St. Paul, Minnesota ===
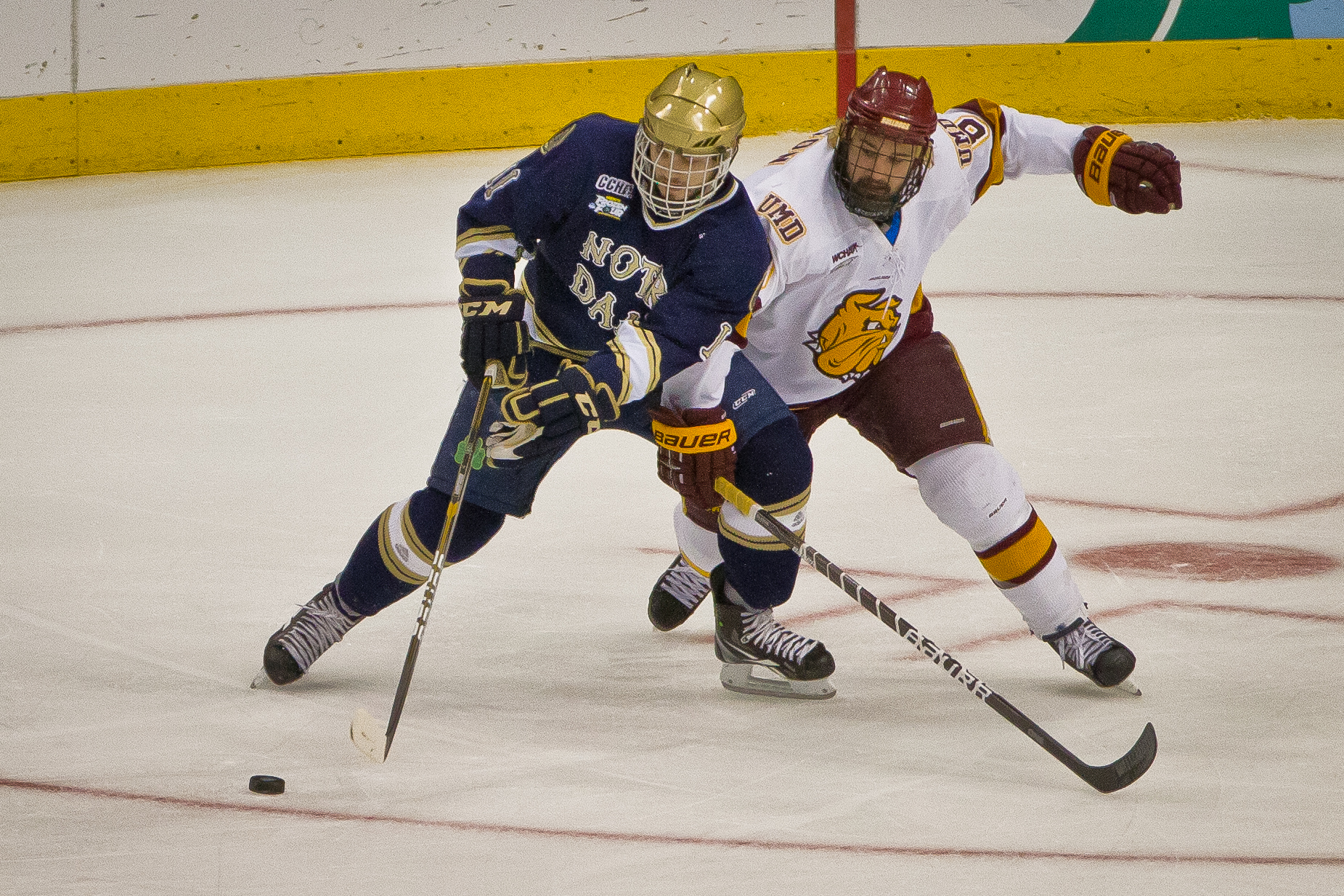
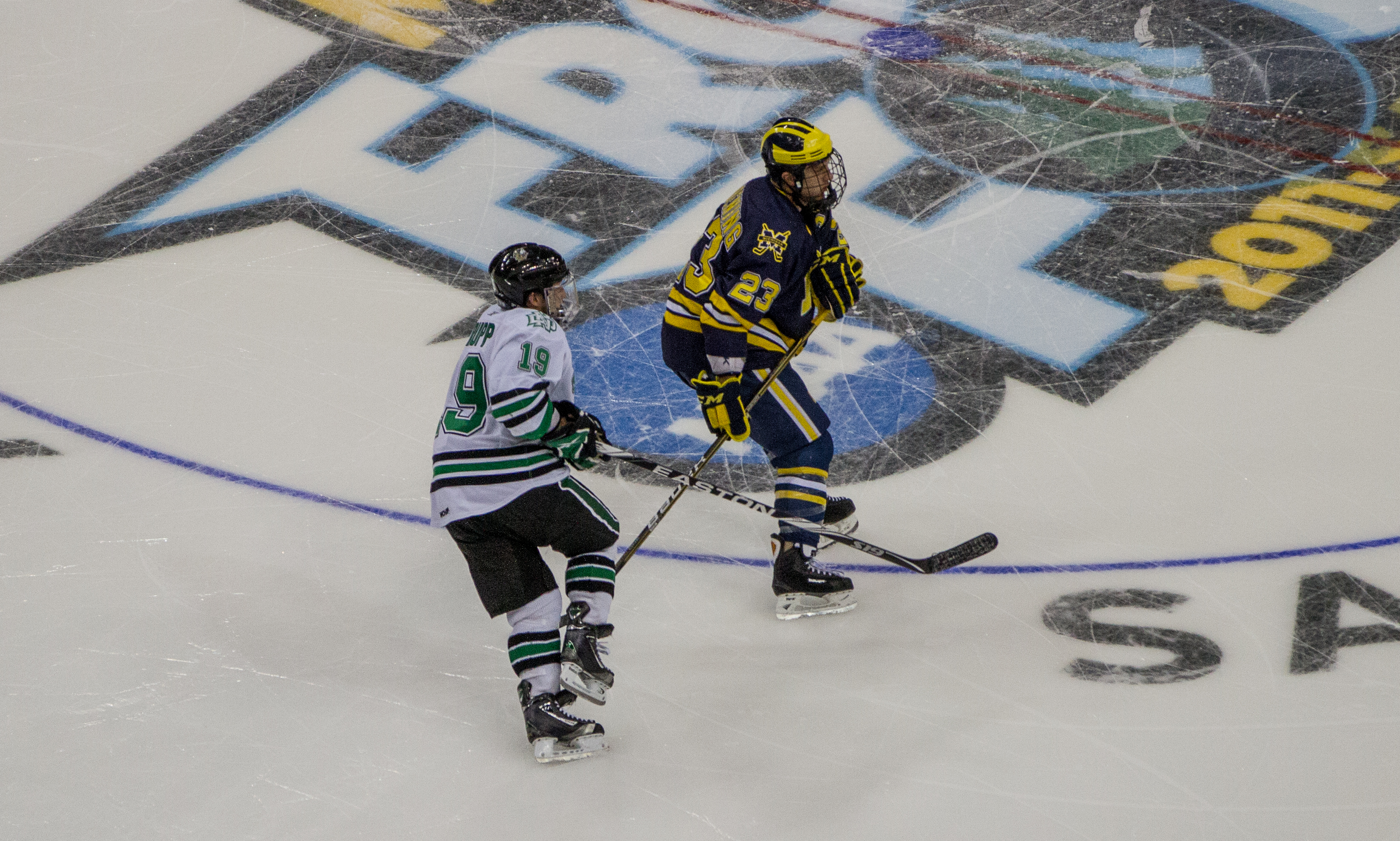
Action from the two semifinal matchups featuring Notre Dame and Minnesota–Duluth (left) and North Dakota and Michigan (right)

==== National Semifinals ====
| April 7, 2011; 4:00 pm CDT | (E3) Minnesota–Duluth | 4–3 (3–2, 1–0, 0–1) | (NE3) Notre Dame | Xcel Energy Center; Attendance: 19,139 |

Game reference

Kenny Reiter
Goalies
Mike Johnson
Referees:
Chip McDonald
Peter Feola
Linesmen:
Glen Cooke
Dave Brown

| | 0 – 1 | 00:49 – Jeff Costello (Guentzel, Lorenz) |
| (Faulk, Fontaine) J. T. Brown – PP – 03:04 | 1 – 1 |
| | 1 – 2 | 09:46 – T. J. Tynan (Guentzel, Larson) |
| (Basaraba, Faulk) Kyle Schmidt – 10:52 | 2 – 2 |
| (Fontaine, Faulk) Mike Connolly – PP – 13:31 | 3 – 2 |
| (Brown, Fontaine) Jack Connolly – GW PP – 25:51 | 4 – 2 |
| | 4 – 3 | 42:05 – SH – Calle Ridderwall (Ryan, Lorenz) |

14 min
Penalties
12 min
34
Shots
21

| April 7, 2011; 7:30 pm CDT | (MW1) North Dakota | 0–2 (0–1, 0–0, 0–1) | (W2) Michigan | Xcel Energy Center; Attendance: 19,139 |

Game reference
| Aaron Dell | Goalies | Shawn Hunwick | Referees: Kevin Shea; Scott Hansen; Linesmen: Bob Bernard; Chris Aughe |
| 0 – 1 / 13:26 – GW – Ben Winnett (Glendening, Merrill); 0 – 2 / 59:24 – EN – Scooter Vaughan (Caporusso, Hagelin) | | | Referees: Kevin Shea; Scott Hansen; Linesmen: Bob Bernard; Chris Aughe |
| 6 min | Penalties | 12 min | Referees: Kevin Shea; Scott Hansen; Linesmen: Bob Bernard; Chris Aughe |
| 40 | Shots | 20 | Referees: Kevin Shea; Scott Hansen; Linesmen: Bob Bernard; Chris Aughe |

==== National Championship ====
| April 9, 2011; 6:00 pm CDT | (W2) Michigan | 2–3 (OT) | (E3) Minnesota–Duluth | Xcel Energy Center; Attendance: 19,222 |

Game reference
| Referees: Tim Benedetto; Jeff Bunyon; Linesmen: Bob Bernard; Chris Aughe |

Scoring summary
| Period | Team | Goal | Assist(s) | Time | Score |
|---|---|---|---|---|---|
| 1st | UM | Ben Winnett (5) | Rust | 14:42 | 1–0 UM |
| 2nd | UMD | Travis Oleksuk (14) | Lamb and Brown | 21:39 | 1–1 |
| 2nd | UMD | Max Tardy (1) – PP | Seidel and Lamb | 29:31 | 2–1 UMD |
| 2nd | UM | Jeff Rohrkemper (3) | Pateryn and DeBlois | 37:46 | 2–2 |
| 3rd | None | | | | |
| 1st Overtime | UMD | Kyle Schmidt (11) – GW | Oleksuk and Lamb | 63:22 | 3–2 UMD |
Penalty summary
| Period | Team | Player | Penalty | Time | PIM |
| 1st | UM | Ben Winnett | Interference | 5:46 | 2:00 |
| 1st | UMD | Jake Hendrickson | Boarding | 9:22 | 2:00 |
| 1st | UM | Chris Brown | Charging | 11:35 | 2:00 |
| 2nd | UM | Kevin Clare | Roughing | 24:10 | 2:00 |
| 2nd | UMD | Brady Lamb | Tripping | 25:41 | 2:00 |
| 2nd | UM | Mac Bennett | Hooking | 29:09 | 2:00 |
| 2nd | UM | Chris Brown | Obstruction-Interference | 32:26 | 2:00 |
| 2nd | UM | Kevin Clare | Tripping | 34:08 | 2:00 |
| 2nd | UMD | J. T. Brown | Unsportsmanlike Conduct | 35:04 | 2:00 |
| 2nd | UM | Shawn Hunwick (Served by Louie Caporusso) | Unsportsmanlike Conduct | 35:04 | 2:00 |
| 2nd | UMD | Jack Connolly | Slashing | 35:18 | 2:00 |
| 3rd | UM | Mac Bennett | Holding | 42:23 | 2:00 |
| 3rd | UMD | Brady Lamb | Roughing | 49:19 | 2:00 |
| 3rd | UM | Jon Merrill | Holding | 49:27 | 2:00 |
| 3rd | UM | Kevin Lynch | Boarding | 51:32 | 2:00 |
| 1st Overtime | None | | | | |

Shots by period
| Team | 1 | 2 | 3 | OT | T |
|---|---|---|---|---|---|
| Minnesota–Duluth | 12 | 15 | 9 | 2 | 38 |
| Michigan | 8 | 9 | 6 | 1 | 24 |

Goaltenders
| Team | Name | Saves | Goals against | Time on ice |
|---|---|---|---|---|
| UMD | Kenny Reiter | 22 | 2 | 63:22 |
| UM | Shawn Hunwick | 35 | 3 | 63:22 |

== Record by conference ==
| Conference | # of bids | Record | Win % | Regional finals | Frozen Four | Championship game | Champions |
|---|---|---|---|---|---|---|---|
| WCHA | 5 | 7–4 | .636 | 4 | 2 | 1 | 1 |
| CCHA | 4 | 5–4 | .556 | 2 | 2 | 1 | 0 |
| Hockey East | 3 | 1–3 | .250 | 1 | 0 | 0 | 0 |
| ECAC Hockey | 3 | 1–3 | .250 | 1 | 0 | 0 | 0 |
| Atlantic Hockey | 1 | 0–1 | .000 | 0 | 0 | 0 | 0 |

== Media ==
=== Television ===
ESPN had US television rights to all games during the tournament. For the seventh consecutive year ESPN aired every game, beginning with the regionals, on ESPN, ESPN2, and ESPNU, and ESPN3.

==== Broadcast Assignments ====
Regionals

- East Regional: Clay Matvick & Barry Melrose – Bridgeport, Connecticut
- West Regional: Ben Holden & Sean Ritchlin – St Louis, Missouri
- Northeast Regional: Justin Kutcher & Damian DiGiulian – Manchester, New Hampshire
- Midwest Regional: Dan Parkhurst & Jim Paradise – Green Bay, Wisconsin

Frozen Four & Championship

- Gary Thorne, Barry Melrose, & Clay Matvick – St. Paul, Minnesota

=== Radio ===
Westwood One used exclusive radio rights to air both the semifinals and the championship, AKA the "Frozen Four."

- Sean Grande & Cap Raeder

== All-Tournament Team ==
=== Frozen Four ===
- G: Shawn Hunwick (Michigan)
- D: Justin Faulk (Minnesota-Duluth)
- D: Jon Merrill (Michigan)
- F: Kyle Schmidt (Minnesota-Duluth)
- F: J. T. Brown* (Minnesota-Duluth)
- F: Ben Winnett (Michigan)

* Most Outstanding Player(s)
