= Karl Stollery =

Canadian ice hockey player

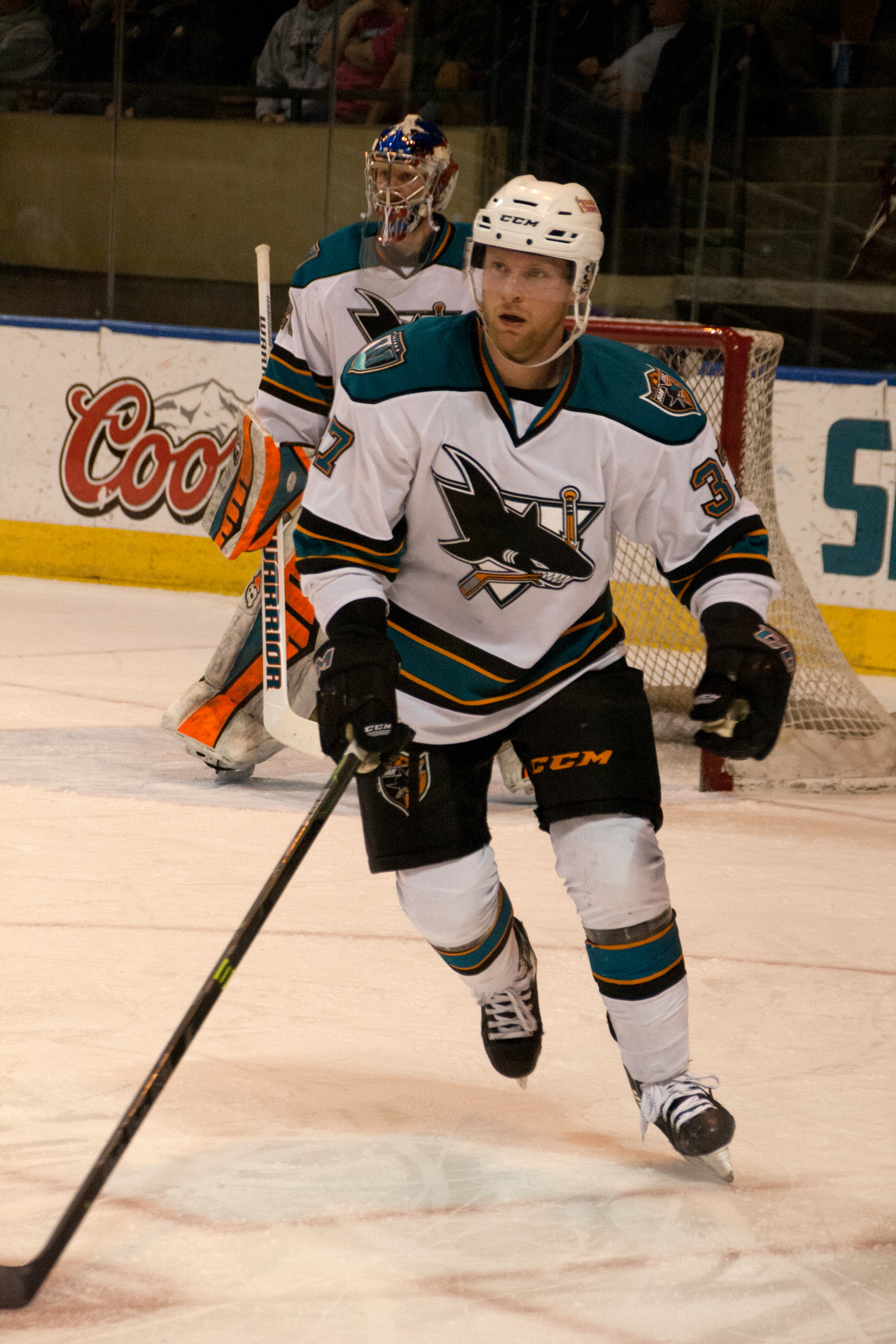
- Stollery in 2015
- Born: November 21, 1987 (age 38) Camrose, Alberta, Canada
- Height: 5 ft 11 in (180 cm)
- Weight: 185 lb (84 kg; 13 st 3 lb)
- Position: Defence
- Shot: Left
- Played for: Colorado Avalanche; San Jose Sharks; New Jersey Devils; Dinamo Riga; Jokerit; Frölunda HC; HC Bolzano
- National team: Canada
- NHL draft: Undrafted
- Playing career: 2012–2021

Karl Stollery (born November 21, 1987) is a Canadian former professional ice hockey defenceman. He most recently played with HC Bolzano, Italian team of the ICE Hockey League (ICEHL).

== Playing career ==
Stollery played minor junior hockey in his hometown for the Camrose Kodiaks of the Alberta Junior Hockey League. In his four seasons with the Kodiaks from 2004 to 2008, he helped clinch the championship and Doyle Cup on three occasions and was a two-time AJHL South All-Star, captaining in his second appearance.

Stollery committed to a collegiate career, with Merrimack College of the Hockey East. In his freshman season in 2008–09, he played in all 34 games and led the defence in scoring with 16 points to be the lone defenceman named to the Hockey East All-Rookie team. In addition to his impact on the ice, Stollery was selected to the Hockey East All-Academic Team. He followed up in his sophomore season by again leading the defence in scoring and appearing in every game for the Warriors. With a second consecutive All-Academic berth, an undrafted Stollery showed his offensive ability and also a surprising physical all-round game, and was invited to the Atlanta Thrashers NHL rookie camp.

As a junior, Stollery produced a career high 27 points during the 2010–11 season, placing second among Hockey East defencemen and earning a selection to the HE All-Tournament Team and an All-Conference honourable mention. He was subsequently announced as Merrimack's captain for his senior year prior to the 2011–12 season. With 21 points in 37 games and a place in the Hockey East Second All-Star team, Stollery completed his career as the Warriors' leading defensive scorer in each year. Having never missed a collegiate game, he also became Merrimack's All-time leader in games played, with 145.

Upon the conclusion of his collegiate career, Stollery was signed to an amateur try-out contract with the Lake Erie Monsters of the American Hockey League on March 24, 2012. He tallied his first professional goal in his third game on March 29, in a 4–3 shoot-out victory over the Houston Aeros. He appeared in the final nine games of Lake Erie's season, to score seven points. With his offensive ability showing through on the powerplay, he was signed to a one-year AHL contract with the Monsters for the following season.

During the 2012–13 season, Stollery became a fixture on the Monsters' blueline. In anchoring the defence, he led the team with 34 points in 72 games, and was signed to a one-year contract with NHL parent affiliate, the Colorado Avalanche, at season's end.

After playing in five scoreless games with Colorado during the 2014–15 season, on March 2, 2015, Stollery was traded by the Avalanche to the San Jose Sharks in exchange for Freddie Hamilton. He was initially assigned to AHL affiliate, the Worcester Sharks, before he was recalled to make his Sharks debut on April 3, 2015, against the Arizona Coyotes. He completed the season with the out-of-contention Sharks playing in the final stretch before he was returned to Worcester for the playoffs.

On June 27, 2015, Stollery was re-signed to a one-year contract to remain with the San Jose Sharks. In the 2015–16 season, he was unable to add to his NHL experience, as he was assigned to new AHL affiliate, the San Jose Barracuda, for the duration of the year.

On July 1, 2016, Stollery signed as a free agent to a one-year, two-way deal with the New Jersey Devils. After starting the 2016-17 season, with the Albany Devils of the AHL, he was recalled and appeared in a career best 11 games with the Devils, recording 3 assists.

On June 14, 2017, as an impending free agent, Stollery left North America in signing a one-year deal with Latvian club, Dinamo Riga of the KHL. After a successful first season in Latvia, scoring 14 points in 53 games for the 2017–18 season, Stollery he Riga as a free agent in the off-season and agreed to a one-year deal to continue in the KHL with Finnish outfit Jokerit on August 17, 2018.

On May 14, 2019, Stollery left the KHL as a free agent and extended his European career by agreeing to a one-year deal with Swedish club Frölunda HC of the SHL.

In January 2021, Stollery signed a half-year contract with the Italian ICE Hockey League team HC Bolzano.

== International play ==
Medal record

Representing Canada

Ice hockey

Olympic Games
Bronze medal – third place	2018 Pyeongchang	

During the 2017–18 season, Stollery was selected to represent Canada at the 2018 Winter Olympics in Pyeongchang, South Korea. Used in a bottom pairing role, he featured in four games to help Canada claim the bronze medal.

== Career statistics ==
=== Regular season and playoffs ===
			Regular season					Playoffs
Season	Team	League	GP	G	A	Pts	PIM	GP	G	A	Pts	PIM
2002–03	Camrose Kodiaks AAA	RAMHL	35	2	18	20	89	2	0	0	0	0
2003–04	Camrose Kodiaks AAA	RAMHL	32	6	14	20	24	4	0	2	2	0
2004–05	Camrose Kodiaks	AJHL	4	0	0	0	0	—	—	—	—	—
2005–06	Camrose Kodiaks	AJHL	42	1	5	6	40	—	—	—	—	—
2006–07	Camrose Kodiaks	AJHL	59	11	24	35	57	17	2	7	9	26
2007–08	Camrose Kodiaks	AJHL	52	3	24	27	40	18	5	10	15	18
2008–09	Merrimack College	HE	34	5	11	16	26	—	—	—	—	—
2009–10	Merrimack College	HE	35	4	15	19	42	—	—	—	—	—
2010–11	Merrimack College	HE	39	6	21	27	48	—	—	—	—	—
2011–12	Merrimack College	HE	37	7	14	21	58	—	—	—	—	—
2011–12	Lake Erie Monsters	AHL	9	2	5	7	4	—	—	—	—	—
2012–13	Lake Erie Monsters	AHL	72	5	29	34	62	—	—	—	—	—
2013–14	Lake Erie Monsters	AHL	68	7	23	30	42	—	—	—	—	—
2013–14	Colorado Avalanche	NHL	2	0	0	0	2	—	—	—	—	—
2014–15	Lake Erie Monsters	AHL	45	5	9	14	55	—	—	—	—	—
2014–15	Colorado Avalanche	NHL	5	0	0	0	2	—	—	—	—	—
2014–15	Worcester Sharks	AHL	14	2	4	6	8	4	1	1	2	6
2014–15	San Jose Sharks	NHL	5	0	0	0	4	—	—	—	—	—
2015–16	San Jose Barracuda	AHL	67	6	18	24	65	4	0	0	0	0
2016–17	Albany Devils	AHL	59	1	16	17	53	3	0	1	1	2
2016–17	New Jersey Devils	NHL	11	0	3	3	13	—	—	—	—	—
2017–18	Dinamo Riga	KHL	53	3	11	14	21	—	—	—	—	—
2018–19	Jokerit	KHL	54	3	7	10	8	3	0	0	0	2
2019–20	Frölunda HC	SHL	41	2	4	6	16	—	—	—	—	—
2020–21	HC Bolzano	ICEHL	13	0	3	3	0	—	—	—	—	—
NHL totals			23	0	3	3	21	—	—	—	—	—
KHL totals			107	6	18	24	56	3	0	0	0	2

=== International ===
Year	Team	Event	Result	GP	G	A	Pts	PIM
2018	Canada	OG	3rd place, bronze medalist(s)	4	0	0	0	0
Senior totals				4	0	0	0	0

== Awards and honours ==
Award	Year
AJHL
South All-Star Team	2007, 2008
AJHL Champion	2007, 2008
Doyle Cup champion	2007, 2008
College
All-Hockey East Rookie Team	2008–09
Merrimack Rookie of the year	2008-09
HE All-Academic Team	2009, 2010
Hockey East All-Tournament Team	2011
All-Hockey East Second Team	2011–12
