= 2011 Hockey East men's ice hockey tournament =

2011 Hockey East Men's ice hockey tournament
- Dates: March 11–19, 2011
- Teams: 8
- Finals site: TD Garden; Boston
- Champions: Boston College (10th title)
- Winning coach: Jerry York (8th title)
- MVP: Cam Atkinson (BC)
- Hockey East Men's Ice Hockey Tournaments

The 2011 Hockey East Men's Ice Hockey Tournament was the 27th tournament in the history of the conference. It was played between March 11 and March 19, 2011 at campus locations and at the TD Garden in Boston, Massachusetts. The Boston College Eagles won their tenth Hockey East Tournament and earned the Hockey East's automatic bid into the 2011 NCAA Division I Men's Ice Hockey Tournament.

== Format ==
The tournament featured three rounds of play. The teams that finish below eighth in the conference are not eligible for tournament play. In the first round, the first and eighth seeds, the second and seventh seeds, the third seed and sixth seeds, and the fourth seed and fifth seeds played a best-of-three with the winner advancing to the semifinals. In the semifinals, the highest and lowest seeds and second highest and second lowest seeds play a single-elimination game, with the winner advancing to the championship game. The tournament champion receives an automatic bid to the 2011 NCAA Division I Men's Ice Hockey Tournament.

== Regular season standings ==
Note: GP = Games played; W = Wins; L = Losses; T = Ties; PTS = Points; GF = Goals For; GA = Goals Against

2010–11 Hockey East standings
	Conference							Overall					
	GP	W	L	T	PTS	GF	GA	GP	W	L	T	GF	GA
#5 Boston College†*	27	20	6	1	41	101	58	39	30	8	1	153	94
#9 New Hampshire	27	17	6	4	38	90	59	39	22	11	6	131	98
#17 Boston University	27	15	6	6	36	76	67	39	19	12	8	116	112
#10 Merrimack	27	16	8	3	35	89	67	39	25	10	4	143	97
#19 Maine	27	14	8	5	33	92	73	36	17	12	7	122	105
Northeastern	27	10	10	7	27	73	69	38	14	16	8	108	104
Vermont	27	6	14	7	19	60	85	36	8	20	8	82	116
Massachusetts	27	5	16	6	16	68	88	35	6	23	6	88	122
Providence	27	4	16	7	15	53	94	34	8	18	8	75	116
Massachusetts–Lowell	27	4	21	2	10	60	102	34	5	25	4	83	136
Championship: Boston College Eagles † indicates conference regular season champion * indicates conference tournament champion Rankings: USCHO.com/CBS College Sports Top 20 Poll

== Bracket ==
Quarterfinals; March 10–13
1	Boston College	4	4	—
8	Massachusetts	1	2	—
2	New Hampshire	3	4	—
7	Vermont	1	3	—
(Pairings are reseeded after the first round)
3	Boston University	2	5	4
6	Northeastern	4	2	5
4	Merrimack	5	6	—
5	Maine	4	2	—

Semifinals; March 18
1	Boston College	5
6	Northeastern	4
2	New Hampshire	1
4	Merrimack	4

Championship; March 19
1	Boston College	5
4	Merrimack	3

Note: * denotes overtime periods

=== Quarterfinals ===
==== (1) Boston College vs. (8) Massachusetts ====
March 11	Boston College	4 - 1	Massachusetts	Conte Forum	Recap
Jimmy Hayes (17) - 10:31		First period	No scoring
Cam Atkinson (28) - pp - 00:14; Brian Gibbons (16) - sh - 11:18		Second period	Daniel Hobbs (12) - pp - 11:52
Barry Almeida (7) - 02:30		Third period	No scoring
John Muse - ( 26 saves / 27 shots )		Goalie stats	Paul Dainton - ( 31 saves / 35 shots )

March 12	Boston College	4 - 2	Massachusetts	Conte Forum	Recap
No scoring		First period	Chase Langeraap (9) - 00:21
Jimmy Hayes (18) - pp - 04:32; Joe Whitney (5) - 08:52		Second period	Michael Marcou (4) - 16:43
Jimmy Hayes (19) - 08:33; Jimmy Hayes (20) - en - 19:37		Third period	No scoring
John Muse - ( 18 saves / 20 shots )		Goalie stats	Paul Dainton - ( 30 saves / 33 shots )

Boston College Wins Series 2-0

==== (2) New Hampshire vs. (7) Vermont ====
March 11	New Hampshire	3 - 1	Vermont	Whittemore Center	Recap
Paul Thompson (27) - 04:23		First period	No scoring
Phil DeSimone (10) - pp - 18:11		Second period	Sebastian Stalberg (9) - 13:20
Stevie Moses (12) - 09:09		Third period	No scoring
Matt DiGirolamo - ( 31 saves / 32 shots )		Goalie stats	Rob Madore - ( 30 saves / 33 shots )

March 12	New Hampshire	4 - 3	Vermont	Whittemore Center	Recap
No scoring		First period	No scoring
Austin Block (4) - 17:14; Stevie Moses (13) - 17:56		Second period	Ben Albertson (4) - 03:49
Paul Thompson (28) - 09:06; Mike Sislo (13) - 17:00		Third period	Tobias Nilsson-Roos (6) - 12:31; Nick Bruneteau (1) - 16:26
Matt DiGirolamo - ( 25 saves / 328 shots )		Goalie stats	Rob Madore - ( 35 saves / 39 shots )

New Hampshire Wins Series 2-0

==== (3) Boston University vs. (6)Northeastern ====
March 10	Boston University	2 - 4	Northeastern	Agganis Arena	Recap
Justin Courtnall (2) - 08:57		First period	Steve Silva (9) - pp - 08:16; Wade MacLeod (19) - 18:05
No scoring		Second period	Braden Pimm (6) - 02:53; Steve Silva (10) - 08:42
Ryan Ruikka (2) - pp - 04:22		Third period	No scoring
Kieran Millan - ( 26 saves / 30 shots )		Goalie stats	Chris Rawlings - ( 37 saves / 39 shots )

March 11	Boston University	5 - 2	Northeastern	Agganis Arena	Recap
Ryan Ruikka (3) - 06:20; Matt Nieto (9) - pp - 09:19; Kevin Gilroy (3) - 13:01		First period	Brodie Reid (9) - pp - 03:25
No scoring		Second period	Jamie Oleksiak (4) - 19:34
Joe Pereira (14) - 11:37; Joe Pereira (15) - en - 19:25		Third period	No scoring
Kieran Millan - ( 30 saves / 32 shots )		Goalie stats	Chris Rawlings - ( 32 saves / 37 shots )

March 13	Boston University	4 - 5	Northeastern	Agganis Arena
Matt Nieto (10) - pp - 15:27		First period	Cody Ferriero (4) - pp - 09:30; Brodie Reid (10) - 11:40
No scoring		Second period	No scoring
Alex Chiasson (14) - pp - 08:49; Justin Courtnall (3) - 18:38; Wade Megan (8) - pp - 19:46		Third period	Steve Silva (11) - pp - 06:48; Brodie Reid (11) - 14:39; Wade MacLeod (20) - en - 17:46
Kieran Millan - ( 27 saves / 31 shots )		Goalie stats	Chris Rawlings - ( 31 saves / 35 shots )

Northeastern Wins Series 2-1

==== (4) Merrimack vs. (5) Maine ====
March 11	Merrimack	5 - 4	Maine	J. Thom Lawler Arena	Recap
No scoring		First period	Gustav Nyquist (18) - pp - 19:19
Karl Stollery (6) - 09:51; Chris Barton (14) - pp - 10:56		Second period	Robby Dee (12) - 07:02
Elliott Sheen (4) - 02:14; Ryan Flanigan (11) - 12:28; Elliott Sheen (5) - sh - 14:34		Third period	Robby Dee (13) - 03:52; Spencer Abbott (17) - 15:28
Joe Cannata - ( 20 saves / 24 shots )		Goalie stats	Dan Sullivan - ( 19 saves / 24 shots )

March 12	Merrimack	6 - 2	Maine	J. Thom Lawler Arena	Recap
Jeff Velleca (6) - 14:01		First period	No scoring
Carter Madsen (8) - 03:57; Mike Collins (12) - pp - 09:08; Ryan Flanigan (12) - 13:19		Second period	Brian Flynn (20) - 10:52
Carter Madsen (9) - 01:36; Carter Madsen (10) - 16:31		Third period	Jeff Dimmen (7) - 4x4 - 09:43
Joe Cannata - ( 29 saves / 30 shots )		Goalie stats	Dan Sullivan - ( 22 saves / 26 shots ) Shawn Sirman - ( 9 saves / 10 shots )

Merrimack Wins Series 2-0

=== Semifinals ===
==== (1) Boston College vs. (6) Northeastern ====
March 18	Boston College	5 - 4	Northeastern	TD Garden	Recap
Brian Gibbons (17) - 16:05		First period	Tyler McNeely (13) - 13:48
Kevin Hayes (4) - pp - 06:56; Steven Whitney (6) - 13:14; Tommy Cross (7) - pp - 19:42		Second period	Wade MacLeod (21) - 07:21
Pat Mullane (7) - pp - 08:22		Third period	Garrett Vermeersch (5) - pp - 16:44; Wade MacLeod (22) - pp - 18:57
John Muse - ( 33 saves / 37 shots )		Goalie stats	Chris Rawlings - ( 23 saves / 27 shots ) Clay Witt - ( 5 saves / 6 shots )

==== (2) New Hampshire vs. (4) Merrimack ====
March 18	New Hampshire	1 - 4	Merrimack	TD Garden	Recap
Stevie Moses (14) - 07:20		First period	Ryan Flanigan (13) - sh - 10:47; Elliott Sheen (6) - 16:50
No scoring		Second period	No scoring
No scoring		Third period	Mike Collins (13) - 14:11; Elliott Sheen (7) - sh - en - 19:53
Matt Di Girolamo - ( 31 saves / 34 shots )		Goalie stats	Joe Cannata - ( 30 saves / 31 shots )

=== Championship ===
==== (1) Boston College vs. (4) Merrimack ====
March 19	Boston College	5 - 3	Merrimack	TD Garden	Recap
Pat Mullane (8) - 09:15; Brian Gibbons (18) - 11:03		First period	Ryan Flanigan (14) - 09:41; Mike Collins (14) - pp - 19:36
No scoring		Second period	No scoring
Cam Atkinson (29) - 09:41; Cam Atkinson (30) - 14:49; Brian Dumoulin (3) - pp - 18:24		Third period	Ryan Flanigan (15) - pp - 13:32
John Muse - ( 36 saves / 39 shots )		Goalie stats	Joe Cannata - ( 30 saves / 35 shots )

== Tournament awards ==
=== All-Tournament Team ===
- F Cam Atkinson* (Boston College)
- F Ryan Flanigan (Merrimack)
- F Brian Gibbons (Boston College)
- D Tommy Cross (Boston College)
- D Karl Stollery (Merrimack)
- G John Muse (Boston College)

* Tournament MVP(s)
