= Scooter Vaughan =

American ice hockey player

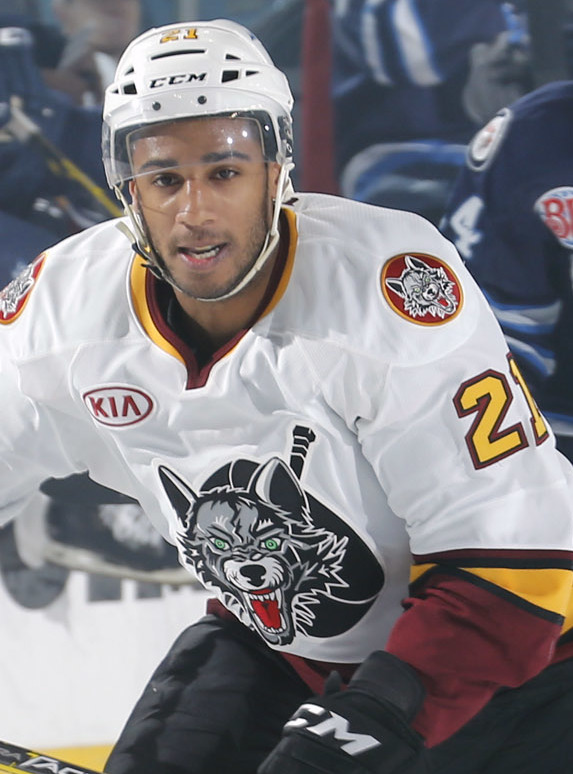
- Vaughan with the Chicago Wolves in 2015
- Born: April 8, 1989 (age 37) Placentia, California, U.S.
- Height: 6 ft 0 in (183 cm)
- Weight: 194 lb (88 kg; 13 st 12 lb)
- Position: Right wing
- Shot: Right
- Played for: Chicago Wolves; Bridgeport Sound Tigers
- NHL draft: Undrafted
- Playing career: 2011–2018

Charles "Scooter" Vaughan (born April 8, 1989) is an American former professional ice hockey winger who played for the Bridgeport Sound Tigers and the Chicago Wolves in the American Hockey League (AHL). Originally a defenceman, Vaughan switched to a forward position in his junior year at the University of Michigan.

== Playing career ==
=== Amateur ===
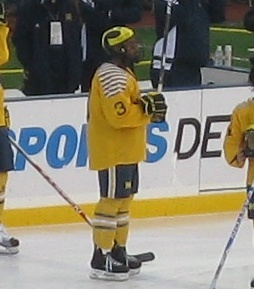
Vaughan playing for University of Michigan in The Big Chill at the Big House

Growing up in California, Vaughan played in roller hockey leagues before transitioning to ice hockey at the age of nine. Vaughan moved from California to Michigan while in high school to compete with the Honeybaked Hockey Club. He then played one year with the St. Louis Bandits in the North American Hockey League (NAHL) before he committed to the University of Michigan. While playing with the Bandits, Vaughan helped them win the 2006–07 Robertson Cup and was named to the NAHL's All-Rookie team.

In his freshman season with the University of Michigan, Vaughan played in 33 games and recorded four points. His first assist came in his collegiate debut against Boston College on October 12, 2007. At the conclusion of the season, Vaughan was awarded the University of Michigan Athletic Academic Achievement award and Red Berenson Scholarship for Men's Ice Hockey.

In his sophomore season, he recorded five points in 25 games to help the Wolverines qualify for the NCAA Tournament. At the conclusion of the season, Vaughan was awarded the Richard and Kathryn Yarmain Scholarship for Men's Ice Hockey. He was then one of five Michigan Wolverine players to be invited to the 2008 USA Hockey's National Junior Evaluation Camp in August. Originally a defenceman, Vaughan switched to a forward position in his junior year at the University of Michigan. That season, he recorded a career-high six points and scored his first collegiate goal. His first goal came in a 5–1 win over Lake Superior State on October 30, 2009.

His senior year, while playing as a forward, was a breakout year for Vaughan. He set new career highs in games played, goals, assists, and points as he helped Michigan become the CCHA regular season champions. At the conclusion of the season, Vaughan was the recipient of the Al Renfrew Scholarship for Men's Ice Hockey and the G.L. Teitelbaum Scholarship for Men's Ice Hockey.

=== Professional ===
Vaughan was invited to the San Jose Sharks training camp prior to the 2011–12 season but was cut on September 16, 2011. During the Sharks training camp, Vaughan broke his arm and required rehabilitation before continuing his post-graduate playing career.

On November 15, 2011, the Wheeling Nailers of the ECHL signed Vaughan to a professional contract. After being released by the Nailers, Vaughan joined the South Carolina Stingrays for the 2012–13 season. While playing with the Stingrays during the 2012–13 season, Vaughan was awarded the 2013 Jerry Zucker Community Service Award.

Vaughan signed a contract with the Stingrays to return for the 2013–14 season. However, after playing in 20 games for the Stingrays, Vaughan signed a professional try out agreement with the Bridgeport Sound Tigers of the American Hockey League (AHL) on December 12, 2013. He scored his first career AHL goal on December 21, 2013, in a 2–1 loss to the Manchester Monarchs. As a result of his play, Vaughan earned a one-year contract with the Sound Tigers for the following season. While playing with the Sound Tigers, Vaughan took on both a defensive and offensive role, transitioning from playing both defense and forward at different points during the season.

After spending the 2014–15 season with the Sound Tigers, Vaughan signed a one-year contract with the Chicago Wolves for the 2015–16 season. In his debut with the Wolves on October 17, 2015, Vaughan scored a goal to help beat the Charlotte Checkers 9–5.

On July 11, 2016, Vaughan signed a contract with the Wolves for the 2016–17 season. On September 12, Vaughan was one of six player invited to the St. Louis Blues training camp on a professional tryout but he was reassigned to the Wolves on September 26. Vaughan played in his 250th AHL game on April 9, 2017, against the Rockford IceHogs and played in his first Calder Cup playoff game on May 5.

Vaughan signed another one-year contract with the Wolves for the 2017–18 season. Although he was invited to the Vegas Golden Knights inaugural training camp prior to the 2017–18 season, he failed to make the final cut and rejoined the Wolves for their training camp. On December 5, 2017, Vaughan was suspended one game for his instigating a fight in the final five minutes during a game against the Grand Rapids Griffins. He won the Yanick Dupre Memorial Award as the AHL's Man of the Year at the conclusion of the season for his work in the community and charitable organizations.

Vaughan was not offered a contract with the Wolves for the 2018–19 season and became a free agent.

== Off the ice ==
Vaughan is the only child of marketing director Charles "Skip" Vaughan and lawyer Orian Southall.

Vaughan played the piano growing up and taught himself guitar. While playing with the Wheeling Nailers, Vaughan and Zack Torquato bought themselves acoustic guitars and played together. Following this, Vaughan created a Kickstarter account for a headphone prototype in 2012 alongside a childhood friend. He also founded Kids For Camps, a charity that funds scholarships to allow for lower-income youth to attend sports or arts camps.

== Playing statistics ==
=== Regular season and playoffs ===
			Regular season					Playoffs
Season	Team	League	GP	G	A	Pts	PIM	GP	G	A	Pts	PIM
2006–07	St. Louis Bandits	NAHL	58	8	27	35	115	12	3	9	12	8
2007–08	University of Michigan	CCHA	33	0	4	4	27	—	—	—	—	—
2008–09	University of Michigan	CCHA	25	0	5	5	29	—	—	—	—	—
2009–10	University of Michigan	CCHA	35	2	4	6	18	—	—	—	—	—
2010–11	University of Michigan	CCHA	44	14	10	24	45	—	—	—	—	—
2011–12	Wheeling Nailers	ECHL	20	1	5	6	21	—	—	—	—	—
2012–13	South Carolina Stingrays	ECHL	50	6	14	20	75	4	1	0	1	2
2013–14	South Carolina Stingrays	ECHL	20	2	6	8	41	—	—	—	—	—
2013–14	Bridgeport Sound Tigers	AHL	51	9	7	16	43	—	—	—	—	—
2014–15	Bridgeport Sound Tigers	AHL	71	9	7	16	102	—	—	—	—	—
2015–16	Chicago Wolves	AHL	68	3	11	14	56	—	—	—	—	—
2016–17	Chicago Wolves	AHL	60	6	6	12	31	4	0	1	1	0
2017–18	Chicago Wolves	AHL	46	2	10	12	33	3	0	0	0	0
AHL totals			296	29	41	70	265	7	0	1	1	0

== Awards and honours ==
Award	Year	Ref
NAHL
NAHL All-Rookie First Team	2007	
NAHL Second All-Star Team	2007	
ECHL
Jerry Zucker Community Service Award	2013	
AHL
Yanick Dupre Memorial Award	2018	
Dan Snyder Man of the Year Award	2018	
