= Brock Matheson =

Canadian ice hockey player

- Born: May 28, 1987 (age 39) Gananoque, Ontario, Canada
- Height: 6 ft 1 in (185 cm)
- Weight: 190 lb (86 kg; 13 st 8 lb)
- Position: Defence
- Shot: Left
- Played for: Friesland Flyers (Eredivisie); Belfast Giants (EIHL); Stockton Thunder (ECHL); Binghamton Senators (AHL); Union College Dutchmen (NCAA)
- Playing career: 2011–2014
Medal record
Ice hockey
Representing Canada East
World Junior A Challenge
Silver medal – second place	2006 Yorkton

Brock Matheson (born May 28, 1987) is a Canadian former professional ice hockey player.

Born in Gananoque, Ontario, Matheson played junior hockey in Ottawa with the Kanata Stallions. Matheson then played with the Union College Dutchmen until 2011. At the end of the 2010–11 season, he made his professional debut with two games with the Binghamton Senators. The following season, Matheson played with the Stockton Thunder of the ECHL and a few games with the Rochester Americans. He then left North America to play for the Belfast Giants in the Elite Ice Hockey League. In 2013, he signed with the Friesland Flyers of Netherlands' Eredivisie league.
