= Brian Gibbons (ice hockey, born 1988) =

American professional ice hockey winger (born 1988)

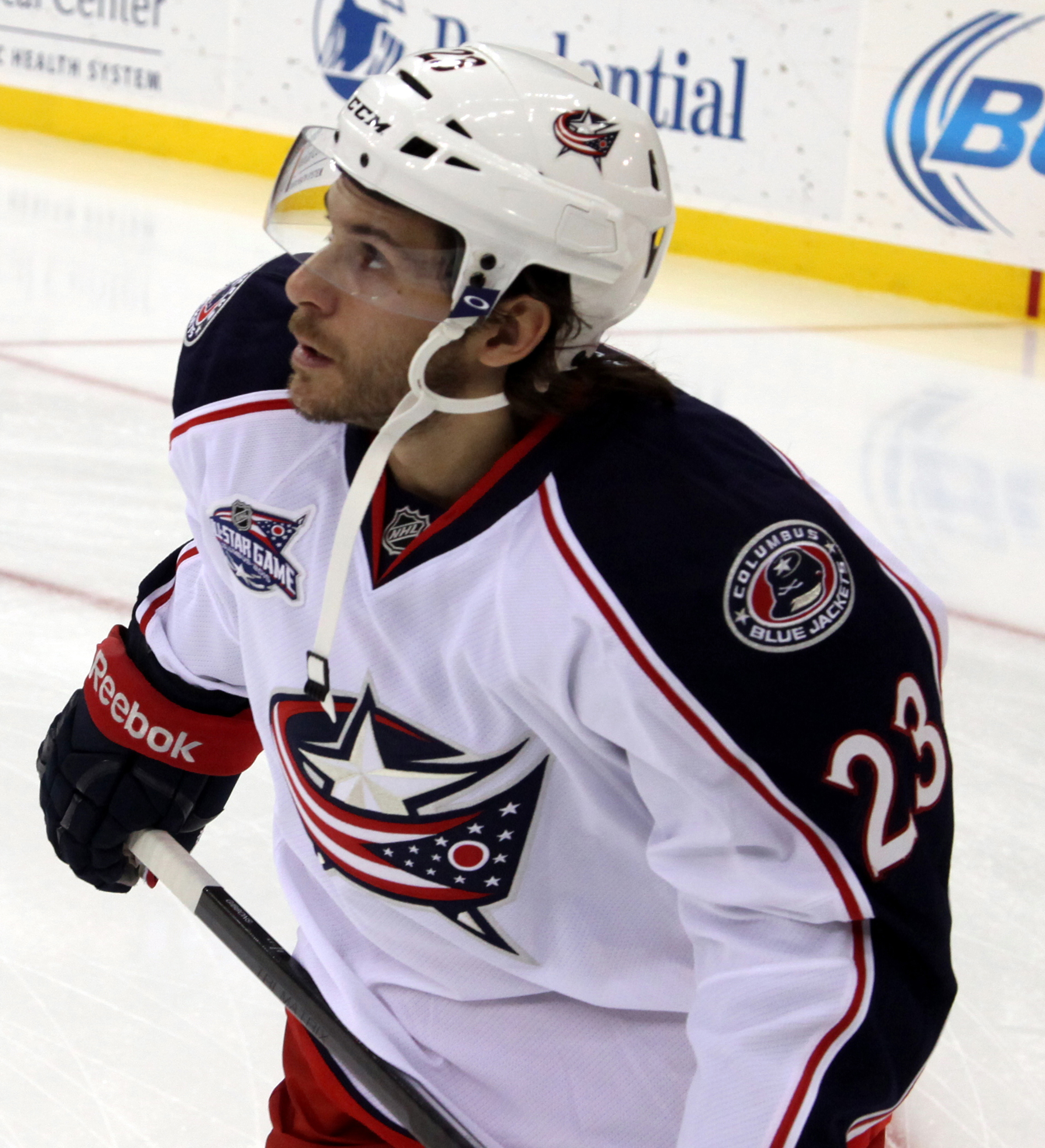
- Gibbons with the Columbus Blue Jackets in 2014
- Born: February 26, 1988 (age 38) Braintree, Massachusetts, U.S.
- Height: 5 ft 8 in (173 cm)
- Weight: 175 lb (79 kg; 12 st 7 lb)
- Position: Right wing
- Shoots: Left
- team Former teams: Free agent Pittsburgh Penguins; Columbus Blue Jackets; New Jersey Devils; Anaheim Ducks; Ottawa Senators; Carolina Hurricanes; Lausanne HC; Linköping HC; ERC Ingolstadt
- National team: United States
- NHL draft: Undrafted
- Playing career: 2011–present

Brian Robert Gibbons (born February 26, 1988) is an American professional ice hockey winger who is currently an unrestricted free agent. He most recently played under contract with ERC Ingolstadt of the Deutsche Eishockey Liga (DEL). He has formerly played for the Pittsburgh Penguins, Columbus Blue Jackets, New Jersey Devils, Anaheim Ducks, Ottawa Senators and Carolina Hurricanes.

== Playing career ==
Prior to turning professional, Gibbons attended the Boston College where he played four seasons with the Boston College Eagles men's ice hockey team which competes in NCAA's Division I in the Hockey East conference.

On April 4, 2011 Gibbons signed a two-year, entry-level contract with the Pittsburgh Penguins worth $1.8 million at the NHL level.

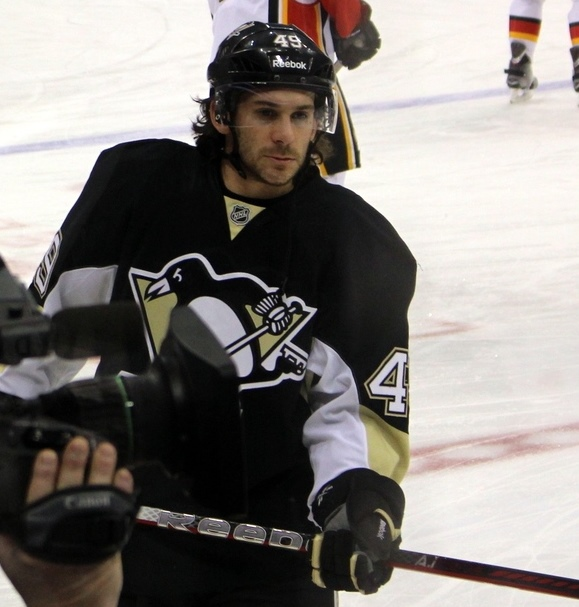
Gibbons in December 2013.

In the 2013–14 season, Gibbons received his first recall by Pittsburgh and scored his first NHL goal in his debut game on his first shot on November 18, 2013, against Viktor Fasth of the Anaheim Ducks. He scored his first power play goal on February 3, 2014, off a deflection from Olli Määttä against Craig Anderson of the Ottawa Senators.

On July 4, 2014, Gibbons left the Penguins organization as a free agent and signed a one-year, two-way contract with the Columbus Blue Jackets.

On July 1, 2015, Gibbons signed as a free agent to a one-year, two-way contract with the New York Rangers. He was assigned by the Rangers to AHL affiliate, the Hartford Wolf Pack, for the duration of the 2015–16 season, compiling 23 points in 63 games.

Unable to feature with the Rangers, Gibbons left as a free agent in the off-season. Unable to secure an NHL contract, he signed a Professional Try-out deal to attend training camp with the New Jersey Devils on September 15, 2016. He later signed a one-year AHL deal with affiliate, the Albany Devils on October 4, 2016.

On July 1, 2017, Gibbons, after a successful tenure in the AHL, finally was offered and agreed to a one-year, two-way contract with the New Jersey Devils for the following 2017–18 season. In the 2017–18 season, Gibbons made a return to the NHL in surprisingly making the Devils opening night roster. In using his speed and high intensity, Gibbons made an impression with the Devils, scoring career highs with 12 goals, 14 assists and 26 points in 59 games.

On July 2, 2018, Gibbons was signed to a one-year, $1 million contract by the Anaheim Ducks. In the 2018–19 season, he recorded two goals and five points in 44 games for Ducks before he was placed on waivers on February 15, 2019. Unable to replicate his previous offensive totals Gibbons was then assigned to AHL affiliate, the San Diego Gulls, however, before reporting he was traded by the Ducks at the trade deadline to the Ottawa Senators in exchange for Patrick Sieloff on February 25, 2019. Gibbons made an instant impact with the cellar-dwelling Senators, recording 6 goals and 14 points in 20 games to end the regular season.

On July 4, 2019, Gibbons signed as a free agent to a one-year, two-way $725,000 contract with the Carolina Hurricanes. Gibbons split the 2019–20 season, between the Hurricanes and AHL affiliate, the Charlotte Checkers, going scoreless in 15 games in the NHL.

Left off the Hurricanes Return to Play roster, Gibbons as a free agent joined Swiss club, Lausanne HC of the National League (NL), on a one-year deal on July 28, 2020.

Limited to just 17 games through his solitary season in the Swedish Hockey League (SHL) with Linköping HC in 2021–22, Gibbons lefts as a free agent and continued his European career by signing a one-year deal with German outfit, ERC Ingolstadt of the DEL, on August 1, 2022.

== Career statistics ==
=== Regular season and playoffs ===
			Regular season					Playoffs
Season	Team	League	GP	G	A	Pts	PIM	GP	G	A	Pts	PIM
2007–08	Boston College	HE	43	13	22	35	32	—	—	—	—	—
2008–09	Boston College	HE	36	9	19	28	52	—	—	—	—	—
2009–10	Boston College	HE	42	16	34	50	78	—	—	—	—	—
2010–11	Boston College	HE	39	18	33	51	79	—	—	—	—	—
2011–12	Wilkes-Barre/Scranton Penguins	AHL	70	11	19	30	26	9	0	0	0	8
2012–13	Wilkes-Barre/Scranton Penguins	AHL	70	8	22	30	34	15	3	5	8	22
2013–14	Wilkes-Barre/Scranton Penguins	AHL	28	11	19	30	43	10	1	2	3	18
2013–14	Pittsburgh Penguins	NHL	41	5	12	17	6	8	2	1	3	2
2014–15	Springfield Falcons	AHL	26	3	8	11	14	—	—	—	—	—
2014–15	Columbus Blue Jackets	NHL	25	0	5	5	8	—	—	—	—	—
2015–16	Hartford Wolf Pack	AHL	63	6	17	23	30	—	—	—	—	—
2016–17	Albany Devils	AHL	72	16	20	36	38	4	1	0	1	2
2017–18	New Jersey Devils	NHL	59	12	14	26	20	2	0	0	0	0
2018–19	Anaheim Ducks	NHL	44	2	3	5	16	—	—	—	—	—
2018–19	Ottawa Senators	NHL	20	6	8	14	4	—	—	—	—	—
2019–20	Charlotte Checkers	AHL	26	4	14	18	40	—	—	—	—	—
2019–20	Carolina Hurricanes	NHL	15	0	0	0	4	—	—	—	—	—
2020–21	Lausanne HC	NL	46	11	22	33	58	6	0	2	2	4
2021–22	Linköping HC	SHL	17	0	1	1	8	—	—	—	—	—
2022–23	ERC Ingolstadt	DEL	11	2	2	4	8	—	—	—	—	—
NHL totals			204	25	42	67	58	10	2	1	3	2

Medal record

Representing United States

Ice hockey

World Championships
Bronze medal – third place	2018 Denmark	

=== International ===
Year	Team	Event	Result	GP	G	A	Pts	PIM
2018	United States	WC	3rd place, bronze medalist(s)	7	0	0	0	2
Senior totals				7	0	0	0	2

== Awards and honors ==
Award	Year
College
All-Hockey East First Team	2009–10
All-Hockey East Second Team	2010–11
Hockey East All-Tournament Team	2011
