= 2010–11 NCAA Division I men's ice hockey season =

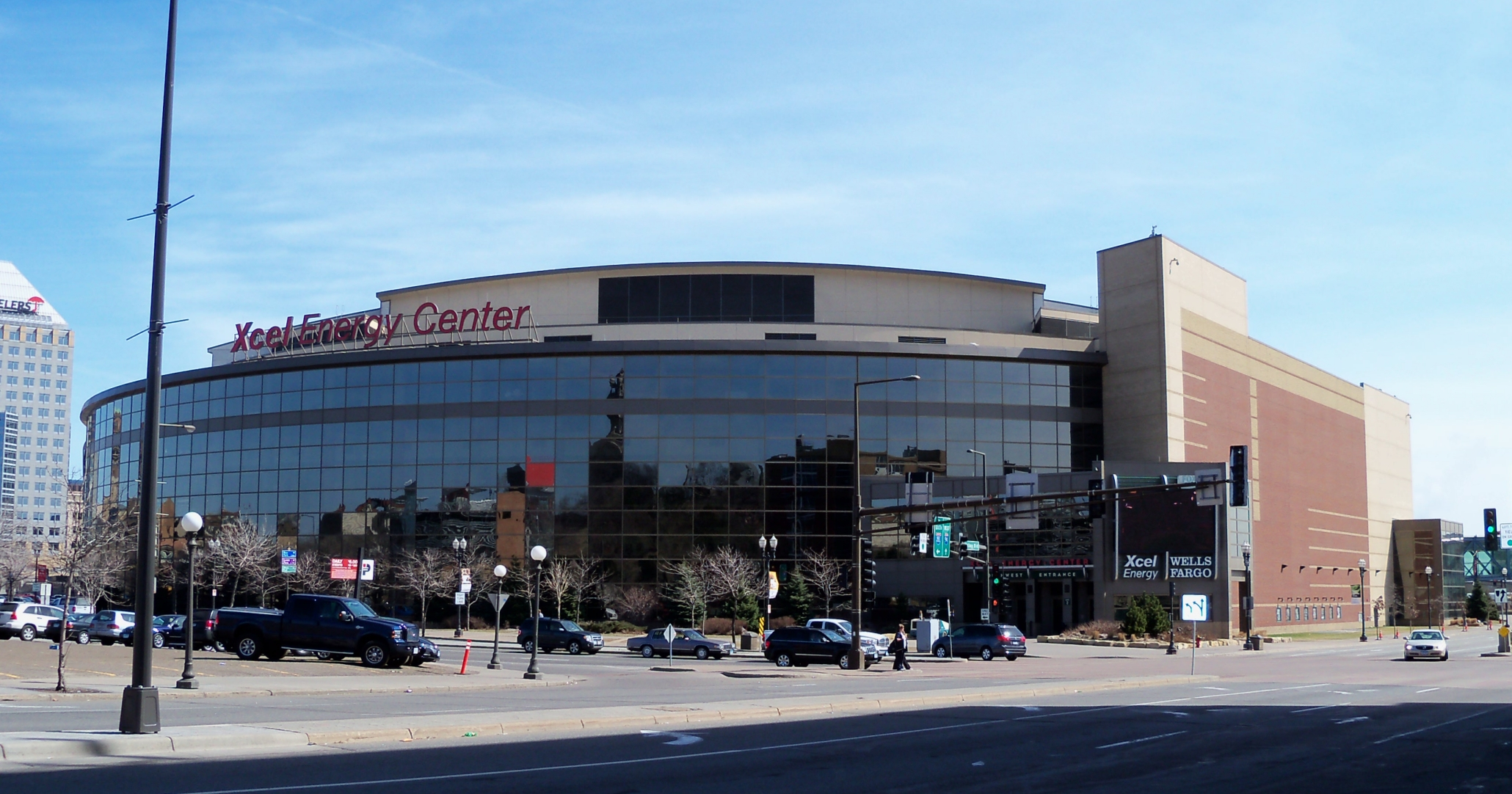
- The Xcel Energy Center in Saint Paul, Minnesota hosted the 2011 Frozen Four
- Duration: October 2, 2010– April 9, 2011
- NCAA tournament: 2011
- National championship: Xcel Energy Center; Saint Paul, Minnesota
- NCAA champion: Minnesota–Duluth
- Hobey Baker Award: Andy Miele (Miami)

The 2010–11 NCAA Division I men's ice hockey season began on October 2, 2010 and concluded with the 2011 NCAA Division I men's ice hockey tournament's championship game on April 9, 2011 at the Xcel Energy Center in Saint Paul, Minnesota. This was the 64th season in which an NCAA ice hockey championship was held and is the 117th year overall where an NCAA school fielded a team.

== Season Outlook ==
=== Pre-season polls ===
The top teams in the nation as ranked before the start of the season.

The U.S. College Hockey Online poll was voted on by coaches, media, and NHL scouts. The USA Today/USA Hockey Magazine poll was voted on by coaches and media.

USCHO Poll
Rank	Team
1	Boston College (45)
2	North Dakota (3)
3	Miami (2)
4	St. Cloud State
5	Michigan
6	Yale
7	Maine
8	Minnesota–Duluth
9	Denver
10	New Hampshire
11	Cornell
12	Alaska
13	Wisconsin
14	Boston University
15	Minnesota
16	Michigan State
17	Notre Dame
18	RIT
19	Union
20	Colorado College

USA Today Poll
Rank	Team
1	Boston College (28)
2	North Dakota (4)
3	Miami (2)
4	Michigan
5	Yale
6	St. Cloud State
7	Maine
8	New Hampshire
9	Minnesota–Duluth
10	Cornell
11	Denver
12	Alaska
13	Wisconsin
14	Boston University
15	Minnesota

== Regular season ==
=== Standings ===
2010–11 Atlantic Hockey standings
	Conference							Overall					
	GP	W	L	T	PTS	GF	GA	GP	W	L	T	GF	GA
RIT†	27	15	5	7	37	95	64	38	19	11	8	128	99
#18 Air Force*	27	14	7	6	34	106	85	38	20	12	6	137	115
Holy Cross	27	14	8	5	33	97	73	38	17	16	5	128	118
Niagara	27	15	10	2	32	99	92	35	18	13	4	124	120
Robert Morris	27	13	9	5	31	89	72	35	18	12	5	107	97
Connecticut	27	13	12	2	28	87	90	37	15	18	4	114	133
Mercyhurst	27	12	13	2	26	98	80	37	15	18	4	131	112
Canisius	27	10	12	5	25	76	83	38	13	19	6	110	135
Army	27	10	13	4	24	69	84	35	11	20	4	86	115
Bentley	27	9	13	5	23	70	88	34	10	18	6	86	117
Sacred Heart	27	5	16	6	16	75	112	37	6	25	6	95	173
American International	27	7	19	1	15	75	113	33	8	24	1	85	140
Championship: Air Force † indicates conference regular season champion * indicates conference tournament champion Current rankings: USCHO.com/CBS College Sports Top 20 Poll

2010–11 Central Collegiate Hockey Association standings
	Conference								Overall					
	GP	W	L	T	SW	PTS	GF	GA	GP	W	L	T	GF	GA
#3 Michigan †	28	20	7	1	0	61	92	57	44	29	11	4	146	98
#4 Notre Dame	28	18	7	3	2	59	95	69	44	25	14	5	151	121
#8 Miami*	28	16	7	5	2	55	103	58	39	23	10	6	146	85
#13 Western Michigan	28	10	9	9	5	44	77	71	42	19	13	10	116	104
Ferris State	28	12	12	4	4	43	59	62	39	18	16	5	94	86
Northern Michigan	28	12	13	3	0	39	61	87	39	15	19	5	91	117
Alaska	28	0^	28^	0^	0^	38	64	66	38	0^	38^	0^	89	91
Lake Superior State	28	8	12	8	5	37	59	78	39	13	17	9	93	115
Ohio State	28	10	14	4	2	36	66	72	37	15	18	4	95	92
Michigan State	28	11	15	2	0	35	65	75	38	15	19	4	98	107
Bowling Green	28	3	21	4	2	15	41	87	41	10	27	4	74	123
Championship: Miami † Conference regular season champion * Conference tournament champion Rankings: USCHO.com/CBS College Sports Top 20 Poll^ Alaska was retroactively required to forfeit all wins and loses due to player ineligibilities.

2010–11 NCAA Division I Independent ice hockey standings
	Overall					
	GP	W	L	T	GF	GA
Alabama–Huntsville	32	4	26	2	61	129
Rankings: USCHO.com/CBS College Sports Top 20 Poll

2010–11 ECAC Hockey standings
	Conference							Overall					
	GP	W	L	T	PTS	GF	GA	GP	W	L	T	GF	GA
#12 Union†	22	17	3	2	36	75	43	40	26	10	4	144	84
#6 Yale*	22	17	4	1	35	84	46	36	28	7	1	151	74
#15 Dartmouth	22	12	8	2	26	70	48	34	19	12	3	111	87
#20 Cornell	22	11	9	2	24	57	53	34	16	15	3	86	88
#16 Rensselaer	22	11	9	2	24	67	52	38	20	13	5	110	90
Princeton	22	11	9	2	24	69	70	32	17	13	2	105	88
Clarkson	22	9	12	1	19	58	78	36	15	19	2	98	117
Quinnipiac	22	6	9	7	19	49	62	39	16	15	8	95	102
Brown	22	8	12	2	18	55	70	31	10	16	5	83	107
Harvard	22	7	14	1	15	49	61	34	12	21	1	77	98
St. Lawrence	22	6	15	1	13	53	73	40	13	22	5	101	124
Colgate	22	4	15	3	11	51	81	42	11	28	3	107	142
Championship: March 19, 2009 † indicates conference regular season champion (Cleary Cup) * indicates conference tournament champion (Whitelaw Cup); Rankings: USCHO.com/CBS College Sports Top 20 Poll

2010–11 Hockey East standings
	Conference							Overall					
	GP	W	L	T	PTS	GF	GA	GP	W	L	T	GF	GA
#5 Boston College†*	27	20	6	1	41	101	58	39	30	8	1	153	94
#9 New Hampshire	27	17	6	4	38	90	59	39	22	11	6	131	98
#17 Boston University	27	15	6	6	36	76	67	39	19	12	8	116	112
#10 Merrimack	27	16	8	3	35	89	67	39	25	10	4	143	97
#19 Maine	27	14	8	5	33	92	73	36	17	12	7	122	105
Northeastern	27	10	10	7	27	73	69	38	14	16	8	108	104
Vermont	27	6	14	7	19	60	85	36	8	20	8	82	116
Massachusetts	27	5	16	6	16	68	88	35	6	23	6	88	122
Providence	27	4	16	7	15	53	94	34	8	18	8	75	116
Massachusetts–Lowell	27	4	21	2	10	60	102	34	5	25	4	83	136
Championship: Boston College Eagles † indicates conference regular season champion * indicates conference tournament champion Rankings: USCHO.com/CBS College Sports Top 20 Poll

2010–11 Western Collegiate Hockey Association standings
	Conference							Overall					
	GP	W	L	T	PTS	GF	GA	GP	W	L	T	GF	GA
#2 North Dakota†*	28	21	6	1	43	112	62	44	32	9	3	178	94
#7 Denver	28	17	8	3	37	93	75	42	25	12	5	136	113
#14 Nebraska–Omaha	28	17	9	2	36	94	69	39	21	16	2	128	99
#1 Minnesota–Duluth	28	15	8	5	35	91	73	42	26	10	6	143	108
Minnesota	28	13	10	5	31	91	78	36	16	14	6	113	102
#11 Colorado College	28	13	13	2	28	83	84	45	23	19	3	143	131
Wisconsin	28	12	13	3	27	75	72	41	21	16	4	129	98
Alaska–Anchorage	28	12	14	2	26	62	78	37	16	18	3	89	106
St. Cloud State	28	11	13	4	26	84	80	38	15	18	5	112	113
Bemidji State	28	8	15	5	21	62	78	38	15	18	5	89	102
Minnesota State	28	8	16	4	20	67	90	38	14	18	6	105	116
Michigan Tech	28	2	24	2	6	49	124	38	4	30	4	75	169
Championship: North Dakota † indicates conference regular season champion * indicates conference tournament champion Current rankings: USCHO.com/CBS College Sports Top 20 Poll

== 2011 NCAA tournament ==
Regional semifinals
1	Yale	2*
4	Air Force	1
East Regional
2	Union	0
3	Minnesota–Duluth	2
1	Miami	1
4	New Hampshire	3
Northeast Regional
2	Merrimack	3
3	Notre Dame	4*
1	North Dakota	6
4	Renssealer	0
Midwest Regional
2	Denver	3**
3	Western Michigan	2
1	Boston College	4
4	Colorado College	8
West Regional
2	Michigan	4*
3	Nebraska–Omaha	3

Regional Finals
1	Yale	3
3	Minnesota–Duluth	5
4	New Hampshire	1
3	Notre Dame	2
1	North Dakota	6
2	Denver	1
4	Colorado College	1
2	Michigan	2

Frozen Four
E3	Minnesota–Duluth	4
NE3	Notre Dame	3
MW1	North Dakota	0
W2	Michigan	2

National championship
E3	Minnesota–Duluth	3*
W2	Michigan	2

Note: * denotes overtime period(s)

== Player stats ==
=== Scoring leaders ===
The following players led the league in points at the conclusion of the regular season.

GP = Games played; G = Goals; A = Assists; Pts = Points; PIM = Penalty minutes

Player	Class	Team	GP	G	A	Pts	PIM
Andy Miele	Senior	Miami	39	24	47	71	35
Matt Frattin	Senior	North Dakota	44	36	24	60	46
Jack Connolly	Junior	Minnesota–Duluth	42	18	41	59	34
Justin Fontaine	Senior	Minnesota–Duluth	42	22	36	58	42
Carter Camper	Senior	Miami	39	19	38	57	27
Paul Zanette	Senior	Niagara	35	29	26	55	45
Reilly Smith	Sophomore	Miami	38	28	26	54	18
Mike Connolly	Junior	Minnesota–Duluth	42	28	26	54	67
T. J. Tynan	Freshman	Notre Dame	44	23	31	54	36
Cam Atkinson	Junior	Boston College	39	31	21	52	28
Paul Thompson	Senior	New Hampshire	39	28	24	52	32

=== Leading goaltenders ===
The following goaltenders led the league in goals against average at the conclusion of the regular season while playing at least 33% of their team's total minutes.

GP = Games played; Min = Minutes played; W = Wins; L = Losses; OT = Overtime/shootout losses; GA = Goals against; SO = Shutouts; SV% = Save percentage; GAA = Goals against average

Player	Class	Team	GP	Min	W	L	OT	GA	SO	SV%	GAA
Aaron Dell	Sophomore	North Dakota	40	2349:02	30	7	2	70	6	.924	1.79
Ryan Rondeau	Senior	Yale	34	2002:15	27	6	1	64	6	.928	1.92
Shane Madolora	Sophomore	RIT	28	1675:50	17	3	7	54	6	.935	1.93
Keith Kinkaid	Sophomore	Union	38	2265:30	25	10	3	75	5	.920	1.99
Pat Nagle	Senior	Ferris State	37	2192:41	18	14	5	74	3	.923	2.02
Connor Knapp	Junior	Miami	17	975:36	8	5	4	33	2	.909	2.03
Cody Reichard	Junior	Miami	24	1374:31	15	5	2	47	3	.912	2.05
Will Yanakeff	Freshman	Michigan State	14	794:36	6	5	1	28	3	.927	2.11
Allen York	Junior	Rensselaer	34	2050:46	18	11	4	74	2	.924	2.17
Sean Bonar	Freshman	Princeton	15	899:57	8	6	1	33	1	.912	2.20

== Awards ==
=== NCAA ===
Award		Recipient
Hobey Baker Award		Andy Miele, Miami
Spencer T. Penrose Award		Nate Leaman, Union
National Rookie of the Year		T. J. Tynan, Notre Dame
Derek Hines Unsung Hero Award		Kyle Schmidt, Minnesota–Duluth
Lowe's Senior CLASS Award		Jacques Lamoureux, Air Force
Tournament Most Outstanding Player		J. T. Brown, Minnesota–Duluth
AHCA All-American Teams
East First Team	Position	West First Team
Keith Kinkaid, Union	G	Pat Nagle, Ferris State
Brian Dumoulin, Boston College	D	Chay Genoway, North Dakota
Blake Kessel, New Hampshire	D	Justin Schultz, Wisconsin
Cam Atkinson, Boston College	F	Jack Connolly, Minnesota–Duluth
Chase Polacek, Rensselaer	F	Matt Frattin, North Dakota
Paul Thompson, New Hampshire	F	Andy Miele, Miami
East Second Team	Position	West Second Team
John Muse, Boston College	G	Aaron Dell, North Dakota
Nick Bailen, Rensselaer	D	Jake Gardiner, Wisconsin
Taylor Fedun, Princeton	D	Zach Redmond, Ferris State
Stéphane Da Costa, Merrimack	F	Carter Camper, Miami
Gustav Nyquist, Maine	F	Mike Connolly, Minnesota–Duluth
Paul Zanette, Niagara	F	Carl Hagelin, Michigan

=== Atlantic Hockey ===
Award		Recipient
Player of the Year		Paul Zanette, Niagara
Best Defensive Forward		Rob Linsmayer, Holy Cross
Best Defenseman		Denny Urban, Robert Morris
Rookie of the Year		Taylor Holstrom, Mercyhurst
Regular Season Goaltending Award		Shane Madolora, RIT
Coach of the Year		Paul Pearl, Holy Cross
Most Valuable Player in Tournament		Jacques Lamoureux, Air Force
Individual Sportsmanship		Furman South, Robert Morris
Regular Season Scoring Trophy		Paul Zanette, Niagara
All-Atlantic Hockey Teams
First Team	Position	Second Team
Shane Madolora, RIT	G	Ryan Zapolski, Mercyhurst
Scott Mathis, Air Force	D	Marcel Alvarez, Army
Denny Urban, Robert Morris	D	Chris Saracino, RIT
Bryan Haczyk, Niagara	F	Tyler Brenner, RIT
Nathan Longpre, Robert Morris	F	Cory Conacher, Canisius
Paul Zanette, Niagara	F	Jacques Lamoureux, Air Force
Third Team	Position	Rookie Team
Brooks Ostergard, Robert Morris	G	Jason Torf, Air Force
Tim Kirby, Air Force	D	Jeffrey Reppucci, Holy Cross
Ryan Annesley, Niagara	D	Adam McKenzie, Air Force
Jeff Terminesi, Mercyhurst	D	
Andrew Favot, RIT	F	Taylor Holstrom, Mercyhurst
Cody Omilusik, Army	F	Ryan Rashid, Niagara
Scott Pitt, Mercyhurst	F	Cole Schneider, Connecticut

=== CCHA ===
Awards		Recipient
Player of the Year		Andy Miele, Miami
Best Defensive Forward		Carl Hagelin, Michigan
Best Defensive Defenseman		Sean Lorenz, Notre Dame
Best Offensive Defenseman		Torey Krug, Michigan
Rookie of the Year		T. J. Tynan, Notre Dame
Best Goaltender		Shawn Hunwick, Michigan
Coach of the Year		Jeff Jackson, Notre Dame
Terry Flanagan Memorial Award		Kevin Petovello, Alaska
Ilitch Humanitarian Award		Trevor Nill, Michigan State
Perani Cup Champion		Andy Miele, Miami
Scholar-Athlete of the Year		Carter Camper, Miami
Most Valuable Player in Tournament		Andy Miele, Miami
All-CCHA Teams
First Team	Position	Second Team
Pat Nagle, Ferris State	G	Scott Greenham, Alaska
Zach Redmond, Ferris State	D	Chris Wideman, Miami
Torey Krug, Michigan State	D	John Merrill, Michigan
Andy Miele, Miami	F	T. J. Tynan, Notre Dame
Carl Hagelin, Michigan	F	Anders Lee, Notre Dame
Carter Camper, Miami	F	
Reilly Smith, Miami	F	
Rookie Team	Position	
Kevin Kapalka, Lake Superior State	G	
Danny DeKeyser, Western Michigan	D	
John Merrill, Michigan	D	
Chase Balisy, Western Michigan	F	
Anders Lee, Notre Dame	F	
T. J. Tynan, Notre Dame	F	

=== ECAC ===
Award		Recipient
Player of the Year		Chase Polacek, Rensselaer
Rookie of the Year		Andrew Calof, Princeton
Tim Taylor Award		Nate Leaman, Union
Best Defensive Forward		Adam Presiznuik, Union
Best Defensive Defenseman		Brock Matheson, Union
Ken Dryden Award		Keith Kinkaid, Union
Student-Athlete of the Year		Stéphane Boileau, Union
Most Outstanding Player in Tournament		Ryan Rondeau, Yale
All-ECAC Hockey Teams
First Team	Position	Second Team
Keith Kinkaid, Union	G	James Mello, Dartmouth
Nick Bailen, Rensselaer	D	Brock Matheson, Union
Taylor Fedun, Princeton	D	Danny Biega, Harvard
Chase Polacek, Rensselaer	F	Jack Maclellan, Brown
Brian O'Neill, Yale	F	Joe Devin, Cornell
Andrew Miller, Yale	F	Kelly Zajac, Union
Third Team	Position	Rookie Team
Allen York, Rensselaer	G	Andy Iles, Cornell
Mike Devin, Cornell	D	Mathew Bodie, Union
Joe Stejskal, Dartmouth	D	Dennis Robertson, Brown
Andrew Calof, Princeton	F	Andrew Calof, Princeton
Chris Cahill, Yale	F	Greg Carey, St. Lawrence
Jeremy Welsh, Union	F	Daniel Carr, Union

=== Hockey East ===
Award		Recipient
Player of the Year		Paul Thompson, New Hampshire
Rookie of the Year		Charlie Coyle, Boston University
Bob Kullen Coach of the Year Award		Jerry York, Boston College
Len Ceglarski Award		Brian Flynn, Maine
Best Defensive Forward		Tanner House, Maine
Best Defensive Defenseman		Brian Dumoulin, Boston College
Three-Stars Award		Paul Thompson, New Hampshire
William Flynn Tournament Most Valuable Player		Cam Atkinson, Boston College
All-Hockey East Teams
First Team	Position	Second Team
John Muse, Boston College	G	Kieran Millan, Boston University
Brian Dumoulin, Boston College	D	Josh Van Dyk, Maine
Blake Kessel, New Hampshire	D	David Warsofsky, Boston University
Cam Atkinson, Boston College	F	Stéphane Da Costa, Merrimack
Gustav Nyquist, Maine	F	Brian Gibbons, Boston College
Paul Thompson, New Hampshire	F	Wade MacLeod, Northeastern
Rookie Team	Position	
Dan Sullivan, Maine	G	
Anthony Bitetto, Northeastern	D	
Adam Clendening, Boston University	D	
Bill Arnold, Boston College	F	
Charlie Coyle, Boston University	F	
Mike Collins, Merrimack	F	
Michael Pereira, Massachusetts	F	
Brodie Reid, Northeastern	F	

=== WCHA ===
Award		Recipient
Player of the Year		Matt Frattin, North Dakota
Defensive Player of the Year		Justin Schultz, Wisconsin
Rookie of the Year		Jason Zucker, Denver
Student-Athlete of the Year		Chay Genoway, North Dakota
Coach of the Year		Dean Blais, Nebraska-Omaha
Most Valuable Player in Tournament		Matt Frattin, North Dakota
All-WCHA Teams
First Team	Position	Second Team
Aaron Dell, North Dakota	G	Kent Patterson, Minnesota
Justin Schultz, Wisconsin	D	Jake Gardiner, Wisconsin
Chay Genoway, North Dakota	D	Matt Donovan, Denver
Matt Frattin, North Dakota	F	Jason Zucker, Denver
Jack Connolly, Minnesota-Duluth	F	Drew Shore, Denver
Mike Connolly, Minnesota-Duluth	F	Justin Fontaine, Minnesota-Duluth
Third Team	Position	Rookie Team
John Faulkner, Nebraska-Omaha	G	Sam Brittain, Denver
Kurt Davis, Minnesota State	D	Justin Faulk, Minnesota-Duluth
Justin Faulk, Minnesota-Duluth	D	David Makowski, Denver
Jason Gregoire, North Dakota	F	Jason Zucker, Denver
Jaden Schwartz, Colorado College	F	Jaden Schwartz, Colorado College
Drew LeBlanc, St. Cloud State	F	J. T. Brown, Minnesota-Duluth

== 2011 NHL entry draft ==
Round	Pick	Player	College	Conference	NHL team
1	14	Jamie Oleksiak	Northeastern	Hockey East	Dallas Stars
1	22	Tyler Biggs ^{†}	Miami	CCHA	Toronto Maple Leafs
2	33	Rocco Grimaldi ^{†}	North Dakota	WCHA	Florida Panthers
2	34	Scott Mayfield ^{†}	Denver	WCHA	New York Islanders
2	36	Adam Clendening	Boston University	Hockey East	Chicago Blackhawks
2	47	Matt Nieto	Boston University	Hockey East	San Jose Sharks
2	60	Mario Lucia ^{†}	Notre Dame	CCHA	Minnesota Wild
3	66	T. J. Tynan	Notre Dame	CCHA	Columbus Blue Jackets
3	72	Steven Fogarty ^{†}	Notre Dame	CCHA	New York Rangers
3	75	Blake Coleman ^{†}	Miami	CCHA	New Jersey Devils
3	78	Brennan Serville ^{†}	Michigan	CCHA	Winnipeg Jets
3	82	Nick Shore	Denver	WCHA	Los Angeles Kings
3	83	Andy Welinski ^{†}	Minnesota–Duluth	WCHA	Anaheim Ducks
3	88	Max Gaede	Minnesota State	WCHA	San Jose Sharks
3	91	Kyle Rau ^{†}	Minnesota	WCHA	Florida Panthers
4	92	Dillon Simpson	North Dakota	WCHA	Edmonton Oilers
4	95	Robbie Russo ^{†}	Notre Dame	CCHA	New York Islanders
4	97	Josiah Didier ^{†}	Denver	WCHA	Montreal Canadiens
4	98	Mike Reilly ^{†}	Minnesota	WCHA	Columbus Blue Jackets
4	101	Joseph LaBate ^{†}	Wisconsin	WCHA	Vancouver Canucks
4	104	Johnny Gaudreau ^{†}	Boston College	Hockey East	Calgary Flames
4	110	Michael Mersch ^{†}	Wisconsin	WCHA	Los Angeles Kings
4	112	Garrett Noonan	Boston University	Hockey East	Nashville Predators
4	115	Patrick McNally ^{†}	Harvard	ECAC Hockey	Vancouver Canucks
4	121	Brian Ferlin ^{†}	Cornell	ECAC Hockey	Boston Bruins
5	128	Seth Ambroz ^{†}	Minnesota	WCHA	Columbus Blue Jackets
5	129	Blake Pietila ^{†}	Michigan Tech	WCHA	New Jersey Devils
5	130	Tony Cameranesi ^{†}	Minnesota–Duluth	WCHA	Toronto Maple Leafs
5	131	Nick Seeler ^{†}	Minnesota	WCHA	Minnesota Wild
5	140	Joel Lowry ^{†}	Cornell	ECAC Hockey	Los Angeles Kings
5	147	Patrick Koudys	Rensselaer	ECAC Hockey	Washington Capitals
5	151	Rob O'Gara ^{†}	Yale	ECAC Hockey	Boston Bruins
6	154	Eddie Wittchow ^{†}	Wisconsin	WCHA	Florida Panthers
6	157	Jason Kasdorf ^{†}	Rensselaer	ECAC Hockey	Winnipeg Jets
6	160	Josh Manson ^{†}	Northeastern	Hockey East	Anaheim Ducks
6	161	Steve Michalek ^{†}	Harvard	ECAC Hockey	Minnesota Wild
6	169	Sam Jardine ^{†}	Ohio State	CCHA	Chicago Blackhawks
6	170	Chase Balisy	Western Michigan	CCHA	Nashville Predators
6	171	Max McCormick ^{†}	Ohio State	CCHA	Ottawa Senators
6	173	Dennis Robertson	Brown	ECAC Hockey	Toronto Maple Leafs
6	176	Petr Placek ^{†}	Harvard	ECAC Hockey	Philadelphia Flyers
6	177	Travis Boyd ^{†}	Minnesota	WCHA	Washington Capitals
6	178	Adam Wilcox ^{†}	Minnesota	WCHA	Tampa Bay Lightning
7	187	Aaron Harstad ^{†}	Colorado College	WCHA	Winnipeg Jets
7	189	Patrick Daly ^{†}	Wisconsin	WCHA	New Jersey Devils
7	194	Colin Blackwell ^{†}	Harvard	ECAC Hockey	San Jose Sharks
7	196	Zac Larraza ^{†}	Denver	WCHA	Phoenix Coyotes
7	197	Brad Navin ^{†}	Wisconsin	WCHA	Buffalo Sabres
7	198	Colin Sullivan ^{†}	Boston College	Hockey East	Montreal Canadiens
7	201	Matthew Peca ^{†}	Quinnipiac	ECAC Hockey	Tampa Bay Lightning
7	203	Max Everson ^{†}	Harvard	ECAC Hockey	Toronto Maple Leafs
7	204	Ryan Dzingel ^{†}	Ohio State	CCHA	Ottawa Senators
7	207	Garrett Haar ^{†}	Western Michigan	CCHA	Washington Capitals
7	209	Scott Wilson ^{†}	Massachusetts–Lowell	Hockey East	Pittsburgh Penguins

† incoming freshman

== See also ==
- 2010–11 NCAA Division II men's ice hockey season
- 2010–11 NCAA Division III men's ice hockey season
- 2010–11 NCAA Division I women's ice hockey season
