= Wade MacLeod =

Canadian ice hockey player (1987–2025)

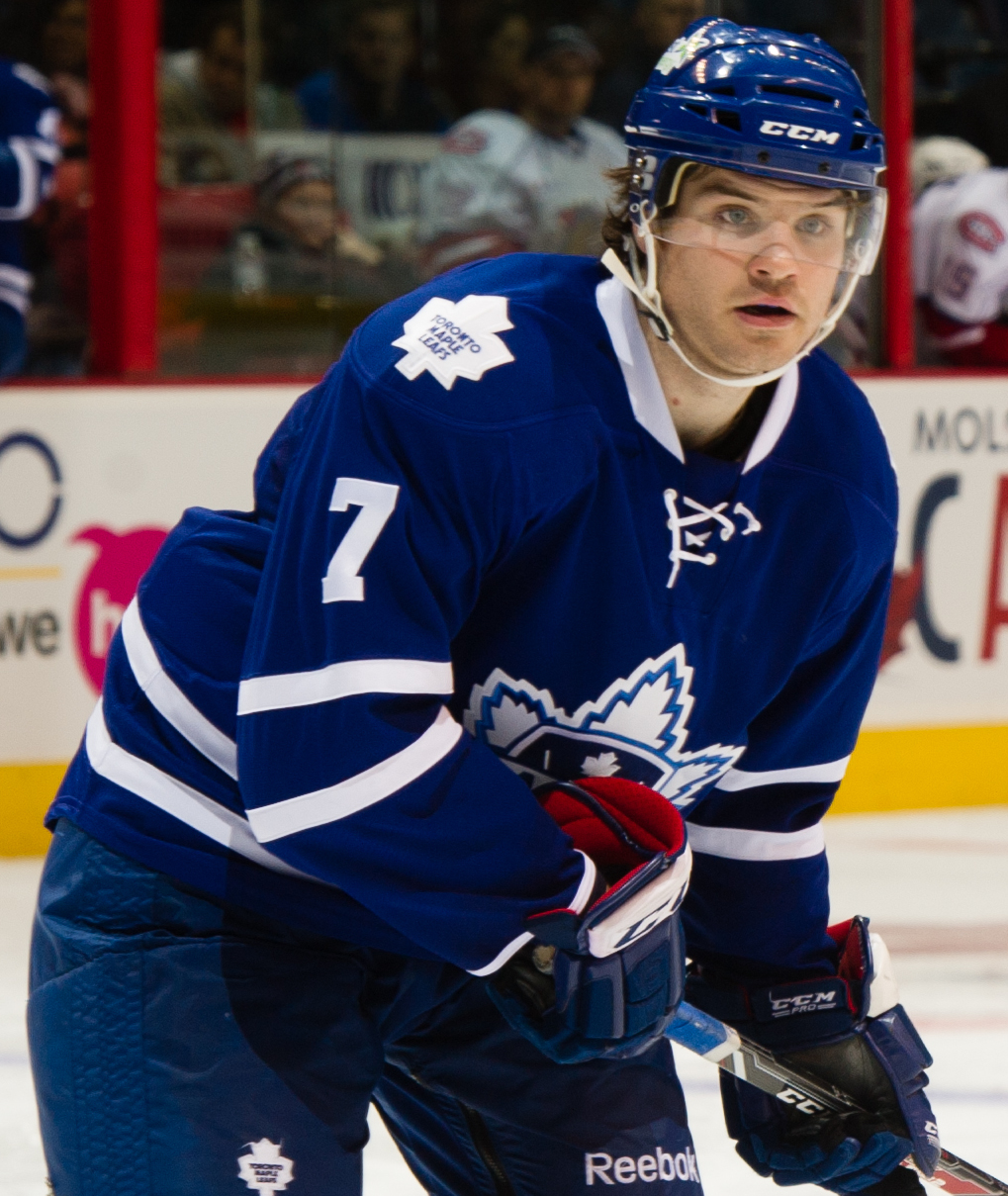
- MacLeod with the Toronto Marlies in 2013
- Born: January 20, 1987 Coquitlam, British Columbia, Canada
- Died: September 13, 2025 (aged 38) Vancouver, British Columbia, Canada
- Height: 5 ft 11 in (180 cm)
- Weight: 185 lb (84 kg; 13 st 3 lb)
- Position: Left wing
- Shot: Left
- Played for: Springfield Falcons; Toronto Marlies; Starbulls Rosenheim; Allen Americans; Löwen Frankfurt; Manchester Storm; Narvik IK; Lillehammer IK
- NHL draft: Undrafted
- Playing career: 2011–2025

Wade MacLeod (January 20, 1987 – September 13, 2025) was a Canadian professional ice hockey player who played with Norwegian side Narvik IK. He also played for Manchester Storm in the UK Elite Ice Hockey League (EIHL).

== Playing career ==
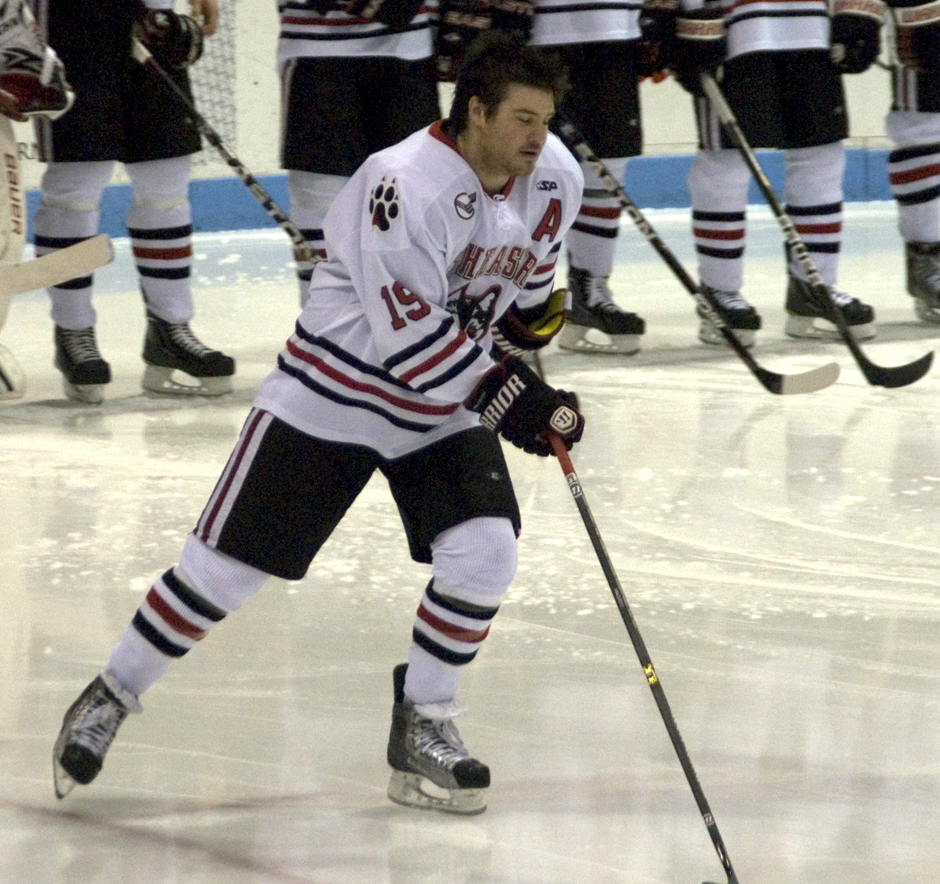
MacLeod playing with the Northeastern Huskies men's ice hockey in January 2011

MacLeod attended Northeastern University from 2007 to 2011, where he played NCAA Division I college hockey with the Northeastern Huskies men's ice hockey team, scoring 137 points in 149 games played.

On March 21, 2011, MacLeod signed an amateur tryout agreement with the Springfield Falcons of the American Hockey League, and he signed an extension with the team before the start of the 2011–12 AHL season.

On September 30, 2013, MacLeod was signed to a one-year contract with the Toronto Marlies of the American Hockey League. On November 21, 2013, MacLeod was loaned to ECHL affiliate, the Orlando Solar Bears.

On September 15, 2014, MacLeod signed a one-year ECHL contract with the Idaho Steelheads. In the 2014–15 season, MacLeod scored a professional high with 80 points in 72 games.

On the back of his breakout season with the Steelheads, on May 15, 2015, MacLeod signed his first contract abroad with German club Starbulls Rosenheim of the DEL2.

After a spell with Löwen Frankfurt, MacLeod stepped away from hockey. However in August 2021, MacLeod agreed terms with UK Elite Ice Hockey League (EIHL) side Manchester Storm. He left Manchester by mutual consent in November 2021.

At the end of November 2021, MacLeod subsequently signed with Norwegian side Narvik IK, later playing one game on loan with Lillehammer IK.

== Death ==
MacLeod died from brain cancer on September 13, 2025, at the age of 38.

== Awards and honors ==
Award	Year
All-Hockey East Second team	2010–11
