= Cam Atkinson =

American ice hockey player (born 1989)

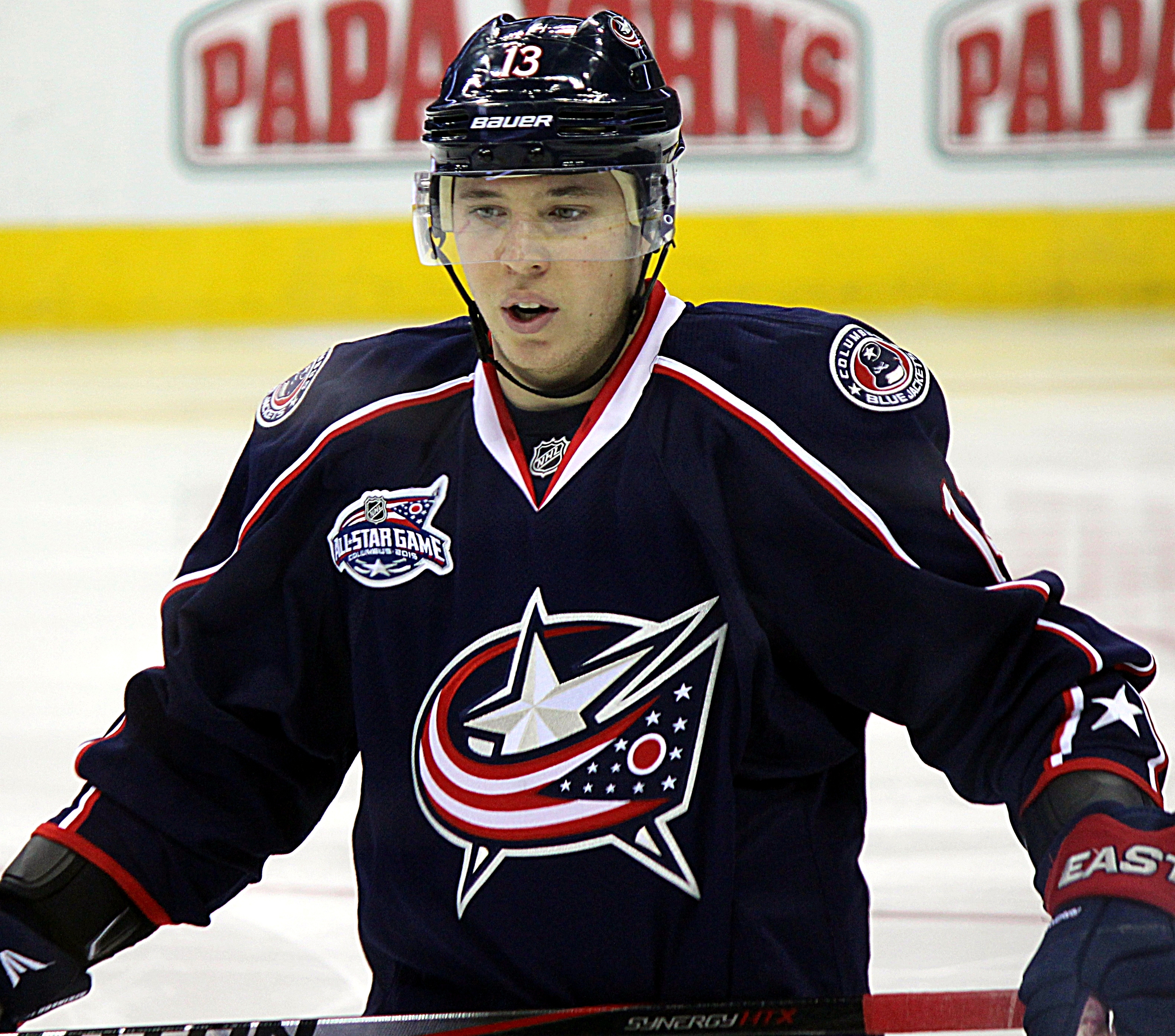
- Atkinson with the Columbus Blue Jackets in December 2014
- Born: June 5, 1989 (age 37) Riverside, Connecticut, U.S.
- Height: 5 ft 8 in (173 cm)
- Weight: 182 lb (83 kg; 13 st 0 lb)
- Position: Right wing
- Shot: Right
- Played for: Columbus Blue Jackets; Philadelphia Flyers; Tampa Bay Lightning
- National team: United States
- NHL draft: 157th overall, 2008; Columbus Blue Jackets
- Playing career: 2011–2025

Cameron Thomas Atkinson (born June 5, 1989) is an American former professional ice hockey right winger who played thirteen seasons in the National Hockey League (NHL) for the Columbus Blue Jackets, Philadelphia Flyers, and Tampa Bay Lightning. Atkinson was selected by the Blue Jackets in the sixth round, 157th overall, of the 2008 NHL entry draft.

Although smaller than most forwards in the NHL, he was known during his career for his great speed, slick agility, soft hands, and excellent shooting skills.

== Early life ==
Atkinson was born on June 5, 1989, in Riverside, Connecticut, the middle child of five born to Tom and Ellen Atkinson. All of the Atkinson children began playing hockey at a young age, and while Cam dabbled in "pretty much every sport", his two passions were tennis and ice hockey. In 2004, Atkinson began attending Avon Old Farms, an all-boys' boarding school in Avon, Connecticut, known for its hockey team. When he was 15 years old, Atkinson fractured both his tibia and fibula during a hockey tournament in Marlborough, Massachusetts, and he was told by a doctor that he likely would not skate again. Atkinson's parents had the doctor put his leg in a splint while they sought another opinion. The second physician recommended that a rod and two pins be surgically inserted into Atkinson's leg, and he made a full recovery.

== Playing career ==
=== Collegiate ===
Atkinson, smaller than most other hockey players at 5 feet 8 inches (1.73 m) was generally overlooked by National Hockey League (NHL) teams during his draft year. He was ultimately selected in the sixth round, 157th overall, by the Columbus Blue Jackets in the 2008 NHL entry draft. Rather than enter the NHL right away, Atkinson chose to honor his commitment to play college ice hockey for the Boston College Eagles. His first collegiate goal was the game-winner in his debut game, a 5-4 win over the Wisconsin Badgers on October 10, 2008. He was named Hockey East's Rookie of the Week for the performance. Atkinson played in all 36 regular-season games for Boston College during his freshman 2008–09 season, recording seven goals, including two game-winning goals, and 12 assists for a total of 19 points. Despite the Eagles honoring Atkinson with the Bernie Burke Outstanding Freshman Award, he regarded his own season with trepidation, telling reporters that one "can't have the highest of expectations as a freshman".

In the 2009–10 season, Atkinson led the NCAA in goals scored with 30, including two in the National Championship game. During one stretch of the 2009–10 season Atkinson scored three hat-tricks in ten games.

=== Professional ===
==== Columbus Blue Jackets ====
On March 27, 2011, Columbus signed Atkinson to a two-year entry-level contract that included an amateur tryout agreement to finish out the 2010–11 season for the Springfield Falcons, the Blue Jackets' American Hockey League (AHL) affiliate. He made his professional hockey debut on April 1, 2011, scoring the game-winning goal in a victory over the Bridgeport Sound Tigers. He appeared in five games for Springfield that season, with three goals and five points in the process.

His first NHL goal was scored on October 10, 2011, against Cory Schneider of the Vancouver Canucks, a game the Canucks won 3–2. He was returned to Springfield after playing four games with Columbus in the 2011—12 season.

After his return to the AHL, Atkinson was named to the 2012 AHL Eastern Conference All-Star Team on January 4, 2012, as a result of his impressive play with Springfield during the 2011–12 season, with 15 goals and ten assists through 30 games. He was one of 13 rookies named to the two All-Star teams.

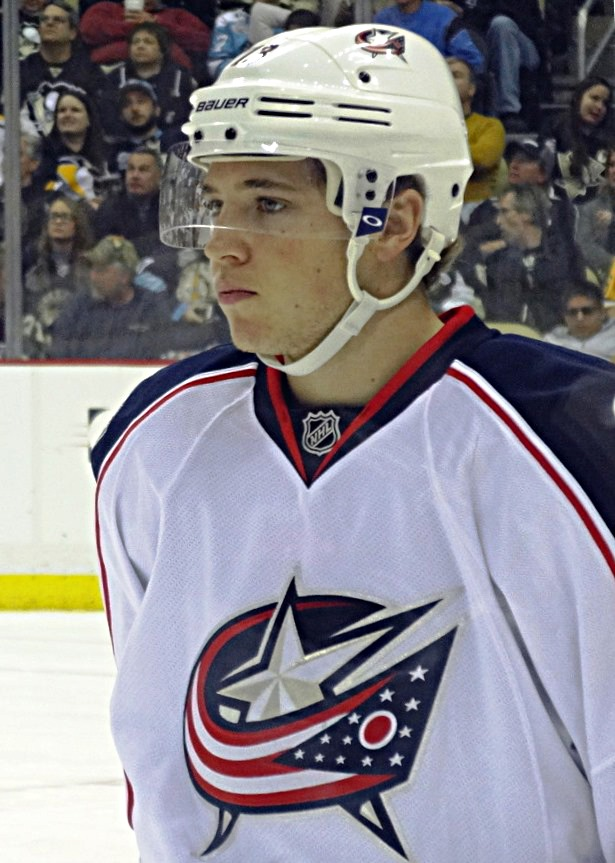
Atkinson with the Blue Jackets, November 2013

On April 5, 2012, Atkinson recorded his first career NHL hat-trick against the Colorado Avalanche in a 5–2 Blue Jacket win. Atkinson recorded his second hat trick against the Chicago Blackhawks to help the Blue Jackets win 5–2 on March 27, 2015. Atkinson recorded his third career hat trick during the 2015–16 season in a 5–2 win over the Montreal Canadiens.

During the 2016–17 season, Atkinson experienced a breakout season, recording phenomenal numbers and helping the Blue Jackets ascend to the top of the standings. He was named to the 2017 NHL All-Star Game as a replacement for Pittsburgh Penguins star Evgeni Malkin, who was pulled out from a lower-body injury. Atkinson was previously considered to have been "snubbed" by being left off the original roster.

On November 16, 2017, the Blue Jackets signed Atkinson to a seven-year, $41.125 million contract extension worth $5.875 million annually. During the 2017–18 season Atkinson recorded his fourth hat trick against the Philadelphia Flyers to help the Blue Jackets win their sixth straight game.

Atkinson had statistically the best season of his career during the 2018–19 season. His 41 goals, 28 assists, and 69 points were career bests in each category. Atkinson also added 8 points in 10 games during the playoffs.

==== Philadelphia Flyers ====
On July 24, 2021, Atkinson was traded by the Blue Jackets to the Philadelphia Flyers in exchange for Jakub Voráček.

He did not play the 2022–23 season due to having a herniated disc while also needing to undergo surgery in his left tricep. Atkinson was placed on the injured reserve after his diagnosis was discovered during training camp. He would subsequently return to the team for the 2023–24 season. Following that season, however, Philadelphia opted to buy out the final year of his contract, making Atkinson a free agent.

==== Tampa Bay Lightning and retirement ====
As an unrestricted free agent for the first time in his career, Atkinson signed a one-year, $900,000 contract with the Tampa Bay Lightning on July 2, 2024.

After going un-signed during the 2025 offseason, on October 8, 2025, the Blue Jackets announced that Atkinson would sign a one-day contract to retire as a member of the team on October 16, with Atkinson subsequently honored prior to the Blue Jackets' home game against the Colorado Avalanche that night.

== Personal life ==
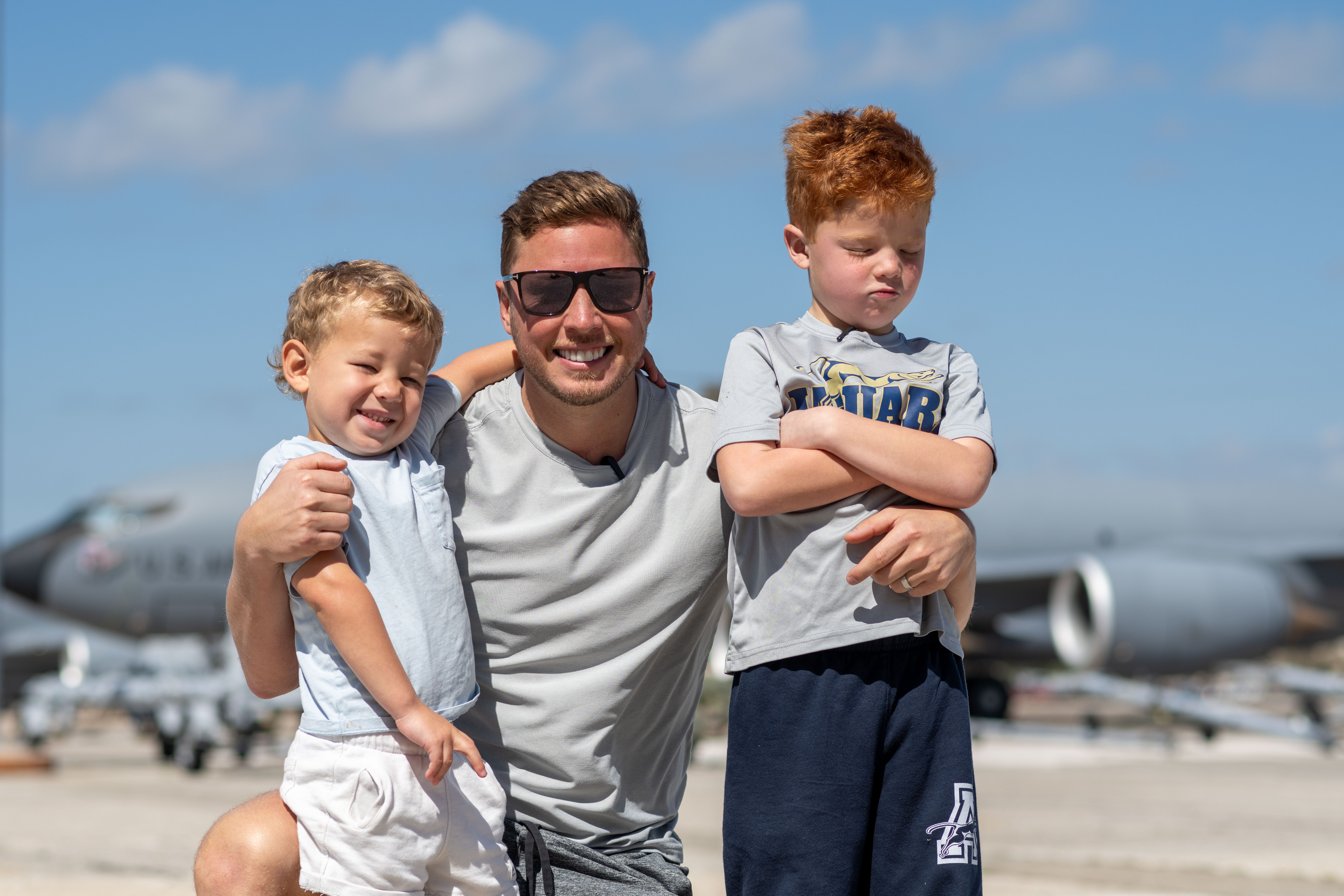
Atkinson (center) with his sons at MacDill Air Force Base in 2025

While playing for the Flyers, Atkinson joined his teammates Scott Laughton and Joel Farabee in their work with local Philadelphia LGBTQ organizations.

== Career statistics ==
=== Regular season and playoffs ===
| | | | Regular season | | | | | Playoffs |
| Season | Team | League | GP | G | A | Pts | PIM | GP | G | A | Pts | PIM |
|---|---|---|---|---|---|---|---|---|---|---|---|---|
| 2005–06 | Avon Old Farms | HS-Prep | 25 | 15 | 20 | 35 | 16 | — | — | — | — | — |
| 2006–07 | Avon Old Farms | HS-Prep | 27 | 28 | 24 | 52 | 12 | — | — | — | — | — |
| 2007–08 | Avon Old Farms | HS-Prep | 28 | 26 | 37 | 63 | 10 | — | — | — | — | — |
| 2008–09 | Boston College | HE | 36 | 7 | 12 | 19 | 28 | — | — | — | — | — |
| 2009–10 | Boston College | HE | 42 | 30 | 23 | 53 | 30 | — | — | — | — | — |
| 2010–11 | Boston College | HE | 38 | 31 | 21 | 52 | 28 | — | — | — | — | — |
| 2010–11 | Springfield Falcons | AHL | 5 | 3 | 2 | 5 | 0 | — | — | — | — | — |
| 2011–12 | Springfield Falcons | AHL | 51 | 29 | 15 | 44 | 31 | — | — | — | — | — |
| 2011–12 | Columbus Blue Jackets | NHL | 27 | 7 | 7 | 14 | 14 | — | — | — | — | — |
| 2012–13 | Springfield Falcons | AHL | 33 | 17 | 21 | 38 | 14 | — | — | — | — | — |
| 2012–13 | Columbus Blue Jackets | NHL | 35 | 9 | 9 | 18 | 4 | — | — | — | — | — |
| 2013–14 | Columbus Blue Jackets | NHL | 79 | 21 | 19 | 40 | 18 | 6 | 1 | 2 | 3 | 0 |
| 2014–15 | Columbus Blue Jackets | NHL | 78 | 22 | 18 | 40 | 22 | — | — | — | — | — |
| 2015–16 | Columbus Blue Jackets | NHL | 81 | 27 | 26 | 53 | 22 | — | — | — | — | — |
| 2016–17 | Columbus Blue Jackets | NHL | 82 | 35 | 27 | 62 | 22 | 5 | 2 | 1 | 3 | 0 |
| 2017–18 | Columbus Blue Jackets | NHL | 65 | 24 | 22 | 46 | 14 | 6 | 2 | 2 | 4 | 2 |
| 2018–19 | Columbus Blue Jackets | NHL | 80 | 41 | 28 | 69 | 20 | 10 | 2 | 6 | 8 | 4 |
| 2019–20 | Columbus Blue Jackets | NHL | 44 | 12 | 14 | 26 | 6 | 8 | 3 | 5 | 8 | 4 |
| 2020–21 | Columbus Blue Jackets | NHL | 56 | 15 | 19 | 34 | 4 | — | — | — | — | — |
| 2021–22 | Philadelphia Flyers | NHL | 73 | 23 | 27 | 50 | 10 | — | — | — | — | — |
| 2023–24 | Philadelphia Flyers | NHL | 70 | 13 | 15 | 28 | 27 | — | — | — | — | — |
| 2024–25 | Tampa Bay Lightning | NHL | 39 | 4 | 5 | 9 | 11 | — | — | — | — | — |
| NHL totals | | | 809 | 253 | 236 | 489 | 194 | 35 | 10 | 16 | 26 | 10 |

=== International ===
Medal record

Representing United States

Ice hockey

World Championships
| Bronze medal – third place | 2018 Denmark | |

| Year | Team | Event | Result | GP | G | A | Pts | PIM |
|---|---|---|---|---|---|---|---|---|
| 2012 | United States | WC | 7th | 8 | 1 | 2 | 3 | 4 |
| 2018 | United States | WC | 3rd place, bronze medalist(s) | 10 | 7 | 4 | 11 | 2 |
| Senior totals | | | | 18 | 8 | 6 | 14 | 6 |

== Awards and honors ==
| Award | Year |
College
| All-Hockey East Second Team | 2009–10 |
| NCAA All-Tournament Team | 2010 |
| All-Hockey East First Team | 2010–11 |
| AHCA East First-Team All-American | 2010–11 |
| Hockey East All-Tournament Team | 2011 |
| Hockey East Tournament MVP | 2011 |
AHL
| AHL Eastern Conference All-Star Team | 2011–12 |
NHL
| NHL All-Star | 2017, 2019 |

Awards and achievements
| Preceded by Matt Lombardi | William Flynn Tournament Most Valuable Player; 2011 | Succeeded by Johnny Gaudreau |
