= Norm Maciver =

Canadian ice hockey player (born 1971)

- Born: September 1, 1964 (age 61) Thunder Bay, Ontario, Canada
- Height: 5 ft 11 in (180 cm)
- Weight: 180 lb (82 kg; 12 st 12 lb)
- Position: Defence
- Shot: Left
- Played for: New York Rangers; Hartford Whalers; Edmonton Oilers; Ottawa Senators; Pittsburgh Penguins; Winnipeg Jets; Phoenix Coyotes
- National team: Canada
- NHL draft: Undrafted
- Playing career: 1986–1999

Norman Steven Maciver (born September 1, 1964) is a Canadian professional ice hockey executive and former player. He is an associate general manager for the Chicago Blackhawks of the National Hockey League (NHL). As a player, he played defence. Maciver played college hockey with the University of Minnesota Duluth (UMD) beginning in 1982. During his time at UMD, Maciver was named an All-American twice, in 1985 and 1986. He went undrafted by NHL teams and signed as a free agent with the New York Rangers in 1986. He then went on to play for the Hartford Whalers and Edmonton Oilers. While with the Oilers' American Hockey League (AHL) affiliate, the Cape Breton Oilers, Maciver won the Eddie Shore Award as the league's best defenceman. He was then selected by the expansion Ottawa Senators in 1992 in the waiver draft and led the team in scoring in their inaugural season. He was then traded to the Pittsburgh Penguins and Winnipeg Jets, appearing in that franchise's final season. When the team and its assets (including the players) were relocated to become the Phoenix Coyotes, Maciver played in their first season in 1996. After a couple of injury-plagued seasons, Maciver retired from playing hockey in 1999 after playing for six teams in the NHL during a thirteen-year professional career. Maciver then took up coaching, first as an assistant in the AHL, then with the Boston Bruins of the NHL.

== Playing career ==
=== Amateur ===
Maciver committed to playing National Collegiate Athletic Association (NCAA) college hockey for the University of Minnesota Duluth (UMD) in April 1982 after attending Sir Winston Churchill High School in Thunder Bay, Ontario. In his first season with the Minnesota Duluth Bulldogs in 1982–83, Maciver played in 45 games, scoring one goal and 26 assists for 27 points, receiving UMD's Freshman of the Year award. The Bulldogs advanced to the school's first ever NCAA tournament, facing the Providence College Friars, but ultimately lost the two-game series. In his sophomore year in 1983–84, he appeared in 31 games, scoring 13 games and 41 games. He missed 12 games with a cracked kneecap to start the season. After being paired with Tom Kurvers, Maciver helped power the Bulldogs and allowed for roster flexibility. Maciver was named a Western Collegiate Hockey Association (WCHA) Second All-League Team. The Bulldogs advanced to the 1984 Frozen Four after defeating the Clarkson University Golden Knights in the quarterfinals. After knocking out the University of North Dakota Fighting Hawks in the semifinals, Maciver and the Bulldogs faced the Bowling Green University Falcons in the final. The Bulldogs were defeated in overtime, 5–4, by Bowling Green.

He returned to the Bulldogs for the 1984–85 season and was now paired with Guy Gosselin on the team's first defence pairing as Kurvers had graduated. With the Bulldogs adding Brett Hull to their ranks, in 47 games, Maciver tallied 14 goals and 61 points and was named the WCHA's First All-League Team. The Bulldogs advanced to the 1985 Frozen Four and faced the Rensselaer Engineers in the semifinal game, which they lost in triple overtime 6–5. The Bulldogs then faced the Boston College Eagles in the third-place game, winning 2–1 in overtime. Maciver was named to the NCAA's 1985 All-American Team. Ahead of the 1985–86 season Maciver was made one of the team's alternate captains. Maciver recorded 11 goals and 62 points in 42 games. The Bulldogs advanced to the WCHA playoffs but were eliminated by the University of Denver Pioneers. Maciver was a finalist for the Hobey Baker Award, awarded to the NCAA's top player, competing with his teammate Hull for the honour. Maciver was named to the 1986 WCHA First All-League Team and the 1986 NCAA All-American Team. While playing at UMD, Maciver earned a communications degree. In 1994, Maciver was named to UMD's 50th anniversary all-time hockey first team.

=== Professional ===
==== New York Rangers (1986–1988) ====
Maciver signed as a free agent with the New York Rangers of the National Hockey League (NHL) on September 8, 1986. Maciver began the 1986–87 season with New York, as he made the club after a strong training camp and pre-season. On October 9, Maciver played in his first career NHL game, recording an assist on a power play goal scored by Lucien DeBlois in a 5–3 loss to the New Jersey Devils. Maciver was then scratched from the lineup for the next game, being replaced by Chris Jensen before being assigned to the Rangers' American Hockey League (AHL) affiliate, the New Haven Nighthawks on October 13. He spent the majority of the 1986–87 season with New Haven, appearing in 71 games marking six goals and 36 points. In seven post-season games with the Nighthawks, Maciver was held to no points. He had a brief callup to New York in April 1987 and appeared in three more games, before being returned to New Haven on April 6 following the end of the NHL regular season.

Maciver split the 1987–88 season between New York and their International Hockey League (IHL) affiliate, the Colorado Rangers. He began the 1987–88 season with Colorado scoring six goals and 26 points in 27 games. Maciver was called up to New York in December after an injury to Mark Tinordi and was paired with David Shaw. On December 29, Maciver scored his first career NHL goal against Kelly Hrudey of the New York Islanders in a 3–3 tie. He marked his first three-point game on January 22, 1988, tallying three assists in a 6–3 victory over the Vancouver Canucks. On February 7, Maciver recorded another three-point game, as he had a goal and two assists in a 6–3 win over the Pittsburgh Penguins. Overall, in 37 games with New York, Maciver scored nine goals and 24 points. However, he missed the end of the season due to a separated shoulder incurred after being pushed into the boards by Scott Stevens in a loss to the Washington Capitals on March 16.

Maciver began the 1988–89 season with the Rangers. In 26 games with New York, Maciver scored no goals and had ten assists. On December 26, 1988, the Rangers traded Maciver, and forwards Brian Lawton and Don Maloney to the Hartford Whalers for forward Carey Wilson and the Whalers' fifth round draft pick in the 1990 NHL entry draft. Maciver became expendable after a previous trade brought two defencemen, Mark Hardy and Dean Kennedy, to the Rangers.

==== Hartford Whalers (1988–1989) ====
Following his trade from the Rangers, Maciver made his Whalers debut on December 26, 1988, in a 4–3 loss to the Pittsburgh Penguins. In his next game with Hartford two nights later on December 28, Maciver scored his first goal with his new club, scoring against Mario Gosselin of the Quebec Nordiques, and added two assists for his third career three-point game, in a 4–4 tie. In 37 games with the Whalers, Maciver scored one goal and 23 points, helping the club reach the post-season. However, by the end of the season Maciver was considered a defensive liability and saw his playing time diminish. On April 9, 1989, Maciver appeared in his first career playoff game, as he was held to no points in the Game 4 loss to the Montreal Canadiens, eliminating the Whalers from the playoffs.

Maciver began the 1989–90 season in the final year of his contract. By September, there were reports that he had been passed on the depth chart by rookie defenceman Adam Burt who was favoured by the new general manager Eddie Johnston, and during training camp, was left behind with the rookie players when the team traveled to play the Pittsburgh Penguins in an exhibition game. He was made available in the waiver draft, but went unclaimed, and was assigned to the Whalers' AHL affiliate, the Binghamton Whalers on October 3. In two games with Binghamton, Maciver had no points. Johnston, not happy with Maciver's performance, did his best to trade him and on October 10, Maciver was sent to the Edmonton Oilers for defenceman Jim Ennis.

==== Edmonton Oilers (1989–1992) ====
Maciver was initially assigned to Edmonton's AHL affiliate, the Cape Breton Oilers but was recalled on October 13 after Craig Muni suffered an injury. He did not see any game time before being returned. He was called up again on October 26 to replace a demoted Chris Joseph and made his Edmonton debut on October 28, going scoreless in a 6–3 victory over the Quebec Nordiques. He was returned to Cape Breton on November 2. In 68 games with Cape Breton, Maciver scored 13 goals and 50 points. Cape Breton qualified for the 1990 playoffs after finishing second in their division. They were eliminated in the quarterfinals in six games. In the playoffs, Maciver earned seven assists.

A restricted free agent in the offseason, he signed a new contract with the Oilers in August 1990. Maciver began the 1990–91 season with Cape Breton. In 56 games in the AHL, Maciver scored 13 goals and 59 points before being recalled to Edmonton in February after Charlie Huddy was injured. For his play in the AHL, Maciver was named a First Team All-Star and won the Eddie Shore Award as the league's best defenceman. He made his NHL season debut on February 18 against the New Jersey Devils and on February 24, Maciver earned his first points with the Oilers, as he had two assists in a 6–3 win over the Quebec Nordiques. On March 24, Maciver scored his first goal with Edmonton against Kelly Hrudey of the Los Angeles Kings in a 4–3 loss. In 21 games with Edmonton, Maciver scored two goals and seven points. The Oiles qualified for the 1991 playoffs and faced the Calgary Flames in the opening round. Maciver, paired with Huddy on the third defence pairing, appeared in his first post-season game with the Oilers on April 4. In the seventh game of the series, Maciver earned an assist for his first career playoff point, as Edmonton defeated Calgary 5–4 to win the series on April 16. The Oilers advanced to the Conference Finals, where they were knocked out by the Minnesota North Stars. In 18 playoff games, Maciver tallied four assists.

Maciver made Edmonton's roster for the 1991–92 season out of training camp. However, by November, with no significant injuries to Edmonton's defence corps, he had sat out 18 straight games. His return to the lineup on November 27 spurred an Oilers 6–2 win over the Chicago Blackhawks. Replacing David Shaw in the lineup, he was often paired with Dave Manson. On February 2, 1992, recorded a goal and two assists, earning three points, in an 8–2 win over the Quebec Nordiques. Less than a month later, on March 1, Maciver repeated this feat, as he scored a goal and two assists in a 4–2 win over the Winnipeg Jets. In 57 games, Maciver scored six goals and 40 points, helping the club reach the post-season. On May 3, Maciver scored his first career NHL playoff goal against Kirk McLean of the Vancouver Canucks in a 4–3 victory. The Oilers advanced to the Conference Finals again but were eliminated by the Chicago Blackhawks. In 13 playoff games, Maciver scored a goal and three points.

In the offseason, Maciver was once again a free agent. He was one of four Oiler free agents that entered training camp without a contract. Oilers owner Peter Pocklington made an arbitrary deadline, demanding that the four players sign new contracts by the end of the team's first two exhibition games or the players would be forced to sit out the year. Maciver did not sign before the deadline and Oilers general manager Glen Sather cancelled all further negotiations and stated that the player would be traded. Maciver was made available in the waiver draft and on October 4, Maciver was claimed by the expansion Ottawa Senators.

==== Ottawa Senators (1992–1995) ====
Maciver joined the Ottawa Senators four days before the start of their inaugural season in 1992–93. He came to a contract agreement with Ottawa shortly before the start of the season, maintaining his position that he would not play for a team without a contract. In his first game with the Senators on October 8, 1992, Maciver earned two assists, as the Senators defeated the Montreal Canadiens 5–3. Two nights later, in his second game with the club, Maciver had two more assists, in a 9–2 loss to the Quebec Nordiques. From the first game, he led the team in scoring. Maciver scored his first goal as a member of the Senators on October 20, putting one past Felix Potvin of the Toronto Maple Leafs in a 5–3 loss. He recorded a five-game point streak between October 16 and October 27. On February 17, 1993, Maciver marked the first multi-goal game of his NHL career, as he scored twice against the Quebec Nordiques in a 6–4 loss. In 80 games with Ottawa, Maciver scored 17 goals and 63 points, setting career highs in goals and points, while leading the Senators in team scoring. Maciver had been vital to the nascent Senators, with head coach Rick Bowness stating that if not for Maciver, the team might not have earned a single point in the season.

Maciver returned for the 1993–94 season, but only after going to salary arbitration with Ottawa, once it became clear that no contract agreement could be reached. On September 16, it was announced that Maciver had signed a three-year contract with an option year. He was named an alternate captain by the team ahead of the start of the season. On November 3, Maciver scored a goal and tallied three assists, earning four points, assisting on all of Alexei Yashin's hat trick goals in a 7–5 over the Edmonton Oilers. Eight days later, on November 11, Maciver marked three assists in a 5–4 loss to the Florida Panthers. He was bothered through the season by a bruised heart, suffered in an exhibition game in September, that left him short of breath and difficulty recovering from fatigue. In March 1994, he missed time after taking a shot off his leg. Then, upon his return in a game on April 9 versus the Washington Capitals, Maciver had both lower bones broken in his right leg in a collision with Calle Johansson, ending his season. He played in 53 games, scoring three goals and 23 points.

The 1994–95 season was delayed due to the 1994–95 lockout, which shortened the season to 48 games and only began on January 20, 1995. Maciver began the season with the Senators, but missed some time due to bruised ribs and a concussion. In 28 games with Ottawa, Maciver scored four goals and 11 points. On April 7, at the NHL trading deadline, the Senators sent Maciver and forward Troy Murray to the Pittsburgh Penguins for forward Martin Straka.

==== Pittsburgh Penguins (1995) ====
Maciver finished the 1994–95 season with Pittsburgh. He made his debut with the Penguins on April 8, going scoreless in a 2–1 loss to the Montreal Canadiens. In his next game with Pittsburgh on April 10, Maciver recorded his first points with the Penguins, two assists, in a 4–3 over his former club, the Ottawa Senators. In 13 games with Pittsburgh, Maciver earned nine assists. The Penguins qualified for the playoffs. In game seven of the first round series against the Washington Capitals, played on May 18, Maciver scored his first career playoff goal with the Penguins, scoring the game-winning goal against Jim Carey in a 3-0 Penguins victory, as Pittsburgh defeated the Capitals in seven games. In 12 post-season games, Maciver scored a goal and five points and the Penguins were eliminated by the New Jersey Devils in the next round.

Maciver began the 1995–96 season with Pittsburgh, but going into the season, the Penguins were not happy about their defence corps. However, once again operating under head coach Eddie Johnston, Maciver began the season as a healthy scratch. It was only after an injury to Sergei Zubov that Maciver got into the lineup. On November 4, Maciver had three assists in a 7–4 win over the Philadelphia Flyers. He had an eight-game point streak end on November 18 against the Washington Capitals. On November 21, Maciver scored his first regular season goal with the Penguins, putting one past Mike Richter of the New York Rangers in a 9–4 loss. In 32 games with the Penguins, Maciver scored two goals and 23 points. However, on December 28, Maciver was traded to the Winnipeg Jets for defenceman Neil Wilkinson in an effort by the Jets to get help for their powerplay and the Penguins to add size to their defence corps.

==== Winnipeg Jets/Phoenix Coyotes (1995–1998) ====
Maciver finished the 1995–96 season with the Jets. He played in his first game with Winning on December 28, 1995, immediately aiding the Jets' power play, assisting on Teemu Selänne's third period goal in a 4–3 loss to the Chicago Blackhawks. Paired with Dave Manson again, on January 5, 1996, Maciver recorded his first goal as a member of the Jets, scoring against Darcy Wakaluk of the Dallas Stars in a 5–4 loss. In 37 games played with the Jets, Maciver scored five goals and 30 points, helping the club reach the post-season. Facing, the Detroit Red Wings in the opening round, On April 28, Maciver scored against Mike Vernon in a 4–1 loss. The loss eliminated the Jets from the post-season, and Maciver scored the last goal in Winnipeg Jets history.

The club and all of its assets, including the players, was relocated to Phoenix, Arizona to become the Phoenix Coyotes ahead of the 1996–97 season. In the offseason, Maciver filed for salary arbitration, but came to an agreement on a multi-year contract with Phoenix in late July. On October 5, Maciver appeared in the Coyotes' first game, earning no points in a 1–0 loss to the Hartford Whalers. Two nights later, on October 7, Maciver scored his first goal with Phoenix, scoring against Bill Ranford of the Boston Bruins, in a 5–2 win. Maciver suffered through an injury plagued season, and was initially out in October suffering from back spasms, but learned in November that he needed surgery to remove a lesion from his neck, missing six to eight weeks. He returned to the lineup on January 23, 1997, in a 6–3 win over the Anaheim Mighty Ducks. In March he missed time with a bruised foot. He finished the season with four goals and 13 points in 32 games.

Maciver returned to the Coyotes for the 1997–98 season. However, early into the season in October, Maciver missed time with a broken hand. He returned on November 8 in a 3–0 victory over the Toronto Maple Leafs. The injury continued to bother him into throughout the season, causing him to miss more time. The injuries limited Maciver to 41 games during the regular season, as he scored two goals and eight points. Phoenix made the playoffs for the first time and faced the Detroit Red Wings in the first round. The Coyotes were eliminated in six games in their best-of-seven series. Maciver earned an assist in the six games. He was made available for selection in the 1998 NHL expansion draft by Phoenix as the Nashville Predators joined the league, but was not selected and became a free agent.

==== Houston Aeros (1998–1999) ====
Maciver went unsigned through most of the 1998 offseason, only agreeing to a 25-day contract with the Houston Aeros of the IHL in October for the 1998–99 season. With the Aeros leading the IHL's Southwest Division, Maciver suffered three broken ribs in January 1999 and missed time. He returned to the lineup in March, and coupled with the return of forward David Oliver, helped the Aeros advance to the 1999 Turner Cup playoffs by winning the Fred A. Huber Trophy as the league's top team. In 49 games with the Aeros, Maciver scored six goals and 31 points. During the playoffs, Maciver missed nine playoff games with an undisclosed injury only returning for game 6 of the second round. He played in ten playoff games, earning five assists, as the Aeros won the Turner Cup. Following the season, Maciver announced his retirement from hockey.

== International play ==
Maciver was invited to join Team Canada for the 1993 World Championships. The team advanced to the semifinals against Russia, but lost in the game to the eventual gold-medal winning team and then faced the Czech Republic in the bronze-medal game. They lost that game too to finish fourth in the tournament.

== Post-playing career ==
=== Springfield Falcons (2000–2003) ===
Maciver joined the Springfield Falcons in August 2000, the Phoenix Coyotes and New York Islanders joint AHL affiliate, as an assistant coach. Working under head coach Marc Potvin, the Falcons struggled to a 29–37–8-6 record during the season, earning 72 points, and finishing in last place in the New England Division in the 2000–01 season. Maciver returned to the Falcons for the 2001–02 season, as the team was now the Coyotes and Tampa Bay Lightning joint affiliate. The Falcons improved to a 35–41–2–2 record, earning 74 points, however, the Falcons finished in fourth place in the North Division. At the end of the season, Potvin was fired as head coach.

In 2002–03, he re-signed as an assistant coach with the Falcons, which named Marty McSorley as their new head coach. Springfield saw a slight improvement, as the club finished the season with a 34–38–7–1 record, earning 76 points, and reaching the Eastern Conference qualifier. In the qualifying series, Springfield upset the Hartford Wolf Pack, winning both games, to advance to the post-season. In the first round of the playoffs, the Falcons lost to the Hamilton Bulldogs three games to one. Following the season, Maciver left the Falcons as he was promoted to the NHL as an assistant coach with the Boston Bruins.

=== Boston Bruins (2003–2006) ===
Maciver joined the Boston Bruins on a two-year contract in July 2003 as an assistant coach to head coach Mike Sullivan. The Bruins had a very successful 2003–04 regular season, as the club finished with a 41–19–15–7 record, earning 104 points, finishing in first place in the Northeast Division. In the post-season, the Bruins were upset by the Montreal Canadiens in the first round. Maciver remained with the Bruins during the cancelled 2004–05 NHL lockout season.

Maciver signed a new two-year contract ahead of the 2005–06 season in August 2005, returning to Boston as an assistant coach under Sullivan. The Bruins struggled during the season, finishing a disappointing 29–37–16 record, earning 74 points, and failing to qualify for the post-season. Following the season, Sullivan and his coaching staff, including Maciver, were relieved of their duties.

=== Chicago Blackhawks/Seattle Kraken (2006–present) ===
In 2007, Maciver was hired by the Chicago Blackhawks to serve as the club's director of player development and was promoted to director of player personnel in 2011. After Marc Bergevin left the club to become the general manager of the Montreal Canadiens for the 2012–13 season, Maciver was promoted to assistant general manager. In July 2020, Maciver was demoted to vice president of player personnel and left the organization in January 2021 to become director of player personnel for the Seattle Kraken.

Maciver returned to the Blackhawks as an associate general manager on March 9, 2022. His return came five months after former Blackhawks general manager Stan Bowman resigned and a week after the Blackhawks named Kyle Davidson as his successor.

== Personal life ==
After retiring from playing hockey, Maciver returned to UMD to finish a university degree in Communications while also performing colour commentary for the Canadian women's national ice hockey team in 2000.

== Career statistics ==
=== Regular season and playoffs ===
			Regular season					Playoffs
Season	Team	League	GP	G	A	Pts	PIM	GP	G	A	Pts	PIM
1982–83	University of Minnesota Duluth	WCHA	45	1	26	27	40	—	—	—	—	—
1983–84	University of Minnesota Duluth	WCHA	31	13	28	41	28	—	—	—	—	—
1984–85	University of Minnesota Duluth	WCHA	47	14	47	61	63	—	—	—	—	—
1985–86	University of Minnesota Duluth	WCHA	42	11	51	62	36	—	—	—	—	—
1986–87	New Haven Nighthawks	AHL	71	6	30	36	73	7	0	0	0	9
1986–87	New York Rangers	NHL	3	0	1	1	0	—	—	—	—	—
1987–88	New York Rangers	NHL	37	9	15	24	14	—	—	—	—	—
1987–88	Colorado Rangers	IHL	27	6	20	26	22	—	—	—	—	—
1988–89	New York Rangers	NHL	26	0	10	10	14	—	—	—	—	—
1988–89	Hartford Whalers	NHL	37	1	22	23	24	1	0	0	0	2
1989–90	Binghamton Whalers	AHL	2	0	0	0	0	—	—	—	—	—
1989–90	Cape Breton Oilers	AHL	68	13	37	50	46	6	0	7	7	10
1989–90	Edmonton Oilers	NHL	1	0	0	0	0	—	—	—	—	—
1990–91	Cape Breton Oilers	AHL	56	13	46	59	60	—	—	—	—	—
1990–91	Edmonton Oilers	NHL	21	2	5	7	14	18	0	4	4	8
1991–92	Edmonton Oilers	NHL	57	6	34	40	38	13	1	2	3	10
1992–93	Ottawa Senators	NHL	80	17	46	63	84	—	—	—	—	—
1993–94	Ottawa Senators	NHL	53	3	20	23	26	—	—	—	—	—
1994–95	Ottawa Senators	NHL	28	4	7	11	10	—	—	—	—	—
1994–95	Pittsburgh Penguins	NHL	13	0	9	9	6	12	1	4	5	8
1995–96	Pittsburgh Penguins	NHL	32	2	21	23	32	—	—	—	—	—
1995–96	Winnipeg Jets	NHL	39	5	25	30	26	6	1	0	1	2
1996–97	Phoenix Coyotes	NHL	32	4	9	13	24	—	—	—	—	—
1997–98	Phoenix Coyotes	NHL	41	2	6	8	38	6	0	1	1	2
1998–99	Houston Aeros	IHL	49	6	25	31	48	10	0	5	5	14
AHL totals			197	32	113	145	188	13	0	7	7	19
NHL totals			500	55	230	285	350	56	3	11	14	32

=== International ===
Year	Team	Event	GP	G	A	Pts	PIM
1993	Canada	WC	8	0	5	5	4
Senior totals			8	0	5	5	4

== Awards and honours ==
Award	Year
College
All-WCHA First Team	1985
AHCA West First-Team All-American	1985
All-WCHA First Team	1986
AHCA West First-Team All-American	1986
AHL
AHL First All-Star Team	1991
Eddie Shore Award (Outstanding Defenceman)	1991

== Sources ==
- Chaimovitch, Jason, ed. (2024). 2024–2025 American Hockey League Official Guide & Record Book. Springfield, Massachusetts: American Hockey League. OCLC 22147888.
- Laroche, Stephen (2014). Changing the Game: A History of NHL Expansion. Toronto: ECW Press. ISBN 978-1-77041-079-4.
- MacGregor, Roy (1993). Road Games: A Year in the Life of the NHL. Toronto: MacFarlane Walter & Ross. ISBN 0-921912-70-6.
