= Justin Fontaine =

Justin Fontaine may refer to:

- Justin Fontaine (ice hockey) (born 1987), Canadian professional hockey player
- Justin Fontaine (racing driver) (born 1997), American racing driver
