= Connie Pleban =

American ice hockey player and coach

Biographical details
- Born: April 24, 1914; Eveleth, Minnesota, U.S.
- Died: October 24, 2001 (aged 87); Duluth, Minnesota, U.S.
- Education: Eveleth Junior College

Playing career
- 1932–1934: Eveleth Junior College
- 1934–1938: Eagle River Falcons
- 1938–1941: Eveleth Rangers
- 1941–1942: Marquette Sentinels
- 1947–1948: Eveleth Rangers
- 1950: Team USA

Coaching career (HC unless noted)
- 1934–1938: Eagle River Falcons
- 1938–1941: Eveleth Rangers
- 1941–1942: Marquette Sentinels
- 1947–1948: Eveleth Rangers
- 1950: Team USA
- 1952: Team USA
- 1955–1959: Minnesota–Duluth
- 1961–1962: Team USA

Administrative career (AD unless noted)
- 1950: Team USA (Manager)

Head coaching record
- Overall: 56–25–5 (.680) [college]

Accomplishments and honors

Championships
- 1956 MIAC Champion; 1957 MIAC Champion; 1958 MIAC Champion; 1959 MIAC Champion

Awards
- 1990 United States Hockey Hall of Fame; 1992 Hobey Baker Legends of College Hockey Award
Medal record
Men's ice hockey
Representing the United States
Olympic Games
| Silver medal – second place | 1952 Oslo |
World Championships
| Silver medal – second place | 1950 London |
| Bronze medal – third place | 1962 Colorado Springs |

John E. "Connie" Pleban (April 24, 1914 – October 24, 2001) was an ice hockey player and head coach who led Team USA to three medal finishes at international competitions.

== Career ==
Pleban was a graduate of Eveleth High School in 1932 and continued his education at Eveleth Junior College. While there, Pleban was a member of the 1934 team that won an intercollegiate championship. After graduating, he became the player/coach for several teams and continued working in that capacity until 1942. After the United States entered World War II, Pleban entered the military and served until the end of the war.

In 1950, Pleban joined the US National Team as a player, coach and manager for the 1950 World Championships, and led the team to a silver medal. He retired as a player following the tournament but repeated the coaching feat two years later at the 1952 Winter Olympics. In 1955, Pleban was named head coach at Minnesota–Duluth and helped the program begin to transition to the top level of college hockey. He led the Bulldogs to the MIAC championship in each of his 4 years with the program, never losing a single conference game.

Pleban returned to Team USA in 1961 but couldn't get the defending Olympic gold medalists to find much success. Finishing with a 1–5–1 record, it was one of the program's poorest records, but Pleban was allowed to remain as coach and produced a far better result the following year. The US went 5–2 and ended up with the bronze medal. Afterwards, Pleban continued to work in the Duluth area, organizing amateur hockey throughout the 1960s and 70's.

He was inducted into the United States Hockey Hall of Fame in 1990 and was the recipient of the Hobey Baker Legends of College Hockey Award in 1992.

== Head coaching record ==
=== International ===
Note: GC = Games coached, W = Wins, L = Losses, T = Ties, GF = Goals For, GA = Goals Against

| Year | Team | Competition | Finish | GC | W | L | T | GF | GA |
|---|---|---|---|---|---|---|---|---|---|
| 1950 | (United States) US National Team | WC | Silver | 5 | 4 | 1 | 0 | 29 | 20 |
| 1952 | (United States) US National Team | OG | Silver | 8 | 6 | 1 | 1 | 43 | 21 |
| 1961 | (United States) US National Team | WC | 6th | 7 | 1 | 5 | 1 | 24 | 43 |
| 1962 | (United States) US National Team | WC | Bronze | 7 | 5 | 2 | 0 | 54 | 23 |

=== College ===
Record table
| Season | Team | Overall | Conference | Standing | Postseason |
|---|---|---|---|---|---|
Minnesota–Duluth Bulldogs (MIAC) (1955–1959)
| 1955–56 | Minnesota–Duluth | 17–6–0 | 12–0–0 | 1st | |
| 1956–57 | Minnesota–Duluth | 16–4–3 | 12–0–0 | 1st | |
| 1957–58 | Minnesota–Duluth | 13–6–1 | 10–0–0 | 1st | |
| 1958–59 | Minnesota–Duluth | 10–9–1 | 7–0–0 | 1st | |
| Total: | | 56–25–5 | | | |
National champion Postseason invitational champion Conference regular season champion Conference regular season and conference tournament champion Division regular season champion Division regular season and conference tournament champion Conference tournament champion

Awards and achievements
| Preceded by Jack Riley | Hobey Baker Legends of College Hockey Award; 1992 | Succeeded by Bill Cleary |
