= Minnesota Duluth Bulldogs men's ice hockey =

- Current season
- University: University of Minnesota Duluth
- Conference: NCHC
- Head coach: Scott Sandelin; 26th season, 469–408–104 (.531)
- Assistant coaches: Adam Krause; Cody Chupp; Brant Nicklin
- Arena: AMSOIL Arena; Duluth, Minnesota
- Colors: Maroon and gold

NCAA tournament champions
- 2011, 2018, 2019

NCAA tournament runner-up
- 1984, 2017

NCAA tournament Frozen Four
- 1984, 1985, 2004, 2011, 2017, 2018, 2019, 2021

NCAA tournament appearances
- 1983, 1984, 1985, 1993, 2004, 2009, 2011, 2012, 2015, 2016, 2017, 2018, 2019, 2021, 2022, 2026

Conference tournament champions
- WCHA: 1984, 1985, 2009; NCHC: 2017, 2019, 2022

Conference regular season champions
- MIAC: 1953, 1954, 1956, 1957, 1958, 1959, 1960, 1961; WCHA: 1984, 1985, 1993

Current uniform
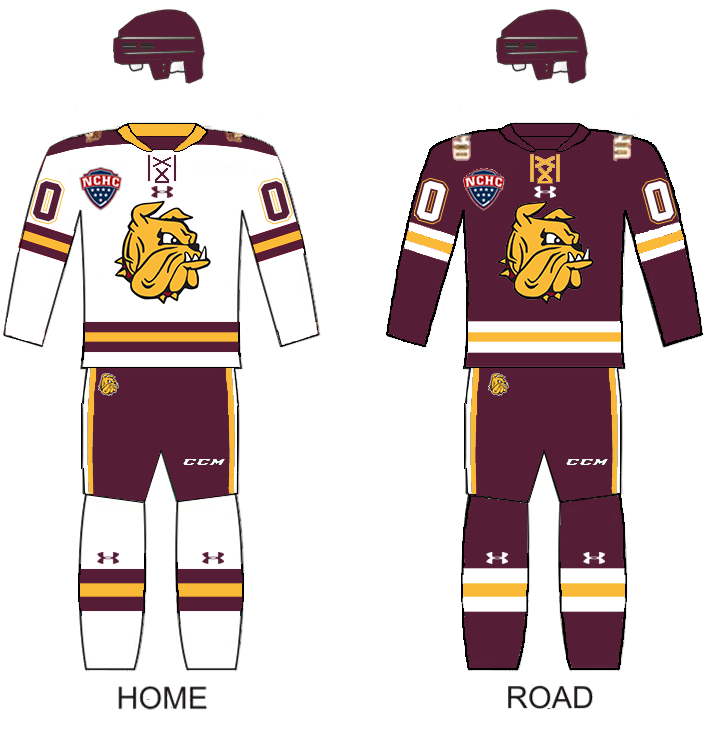

The Minnesota Duluth Bulldogs men's ice hockey team is an NCAA Division I college ice hockey program that represents the University of Minnesota Duluth. The Bulldogs are a member of the National Collegiate Hockey Conference (NCHC). The team plays home games at the 6,800-seat AMSOIL Arena.

The Bulldogs program has produced many NHL players such as Glenn 'Chico' Resch, Jim Johnson who is currently the assistant coach for the San Jose Sharks, Tom Kurvers, Dave Langevin, and Bob Mason. Perhaps the best known alumni of Minnesota-Duluth include Hockey Hall of Fame member Brett Hull, as well as Mark Pavelich and John Harrington, both of whom were members of the Miracle on Ice gold medal-winning 1980 U.S. Olympic Hockey Team. On April 9, 2011, the Bulldogs defeated the University of Michigan, 3–2 in overtime, to win its first NCAA Division I Championship. UMD captured its second national championship on April 7, 2018, with a 2–1 win over the University of Notre Dame, and its third championship (and second consecutive one) on April 13, 2019, with a 3–0 win over the University of Massachusetts Amherst.

== History ==
=== Early history ===
Duluth started its ice hockey team in 1930 but shuttered the program after only two years. Once the depression and World War II had ended, the Bulldogs rekindled the team and played as a minor independent for a few seasons before joining the MIAC as a provisional member. When UMD joined the MIAC fully in 1952 it coincided with the Bulldog's dominance of the conference. In its first two eligible seasons Minnesota–Duluth won the MIAC crown, going 15–2 in league play. After Bob Boyat's one season behind the bench where the team finished 2nd in conference, Connie Pleban took over and the Bulldogs ran roughshod over the MIAC. Duluth won six consecutive MIAC titles without losing a single game in league play. UMD also began to win against some of the major programs by the early 1960 and in 1962, with Ralph Romano now at the helm, the Duluth hockey team left the MIAC and played as an independent looking to promote itself as a major program (no formal distinctions between levels of play existed at the time for ice hockey).

=== WCHA ===
After four seasons the WCHA invited Minnesota–Duluth to join as its 8th member school. The addition of the Bulldogs allowed the WCHA to hold an 8-team conference tournament, which meant that UMD would participate in the first championship in program history. Predictably, the Bulldogs didn't fare well the first time out and that trend held for several seasons, as it was not until 1971 that Duluth notched its first postseason victory. More concerning was that, in its first 15 seasons in the WCHA, UMD produced only 2 winning seasons and never finished above 5th place in the conference. All of that was set to change, however, when Mike Sertich was promoted to head coach in 1982.

=== 1980s success ===
Under Sertich UMD made the NCAA Tournament three straight seasons from 1983 to 1985. The Bulldogs advanced to the NCAA Division I Men's Ice Hockey Tournament for the first time in school history in 1983, but were defeated by Providence College in a two-game series by the scores of 3–7 and 2–3.

In 1983–84 UMD won its first conference regular season title and conference postseason tournament to receive the program's second bid to the NCAA tournament. UMD defeated Clarkson University in the quarterfinals and advanced to the 1984 Frozen Four in Lake Placid, New York. UMD reached the title game by defeating WCHA foe, University of North Dakota, 2–1 in overtime. The championship game featured a match-up between Minnesota–Duluth and Bowling Green (CCHA). After 60 minutes of hockey, the game remained tied, 4–4. Bowling Green's Gino Cavallini scored a goal in the fourth overtime to defeat UMD in the longest NCAA Division I ice hockey championship game in history, 97 minutes and 11 seconds of playing time.

For the third season in a row, the Bulldogs reached the NCAA tournament and for the second straight season UMD reached the Frozen Four. The team had their hopes for a national championship lost in another overtime game, this time a 6–5 semi-final loss in three overtimes to Rensselaer. The Bulldogs would rebound in the third place game to defeat Boston College, 2–1 in overtime.

Minnesota–Duluth next bid to the NCAA tournament would come in 1993. The Bulldogs faced Brown University in the first round, winning 7–3. UMD was defeated by Lake Superior State in the quarterfinals, 4–3. Lake Superior State would go on to the Frozen Four, losing in the national title game to Maine.

=== Recent history ===
UMD's next NCAA post-season berth came after an 11-year drought in 2004. The Bulldogs won the first game in the Midwest Regional, shutting out Michigan State 5–0. The win over Michigan State set up a game against WCHA rival and the defending back-to-back national champions, Minnesota. UMD advanced to the Frozen Four by defeating Minnesota 3–1 and faced another WCHA rival, Denver, in the semi-final game. After two periods, with UMD leading, it was looking very likely that UMD would make it into the NCAA Championship game since UMD hadn't lost all season when leading after two periods, but the Bulldogs lost to the Pioneers 5–3 after a four-goal third period by Denver.

The 2008–09 season marked a historic season for the Bulldogs. The 5th-seeded Minnesota–Duluth swept through the 2009 WCHA playoffs. UMD swept Colorado College in the opening round by scores of 4–1 and 3–1. The Bulldogs advanced to the WCHA Final Five and won 2–1 against Minnesota in the opening game at the Xcel Energy Center in Saint Paul, Minnesota; In the next game, the team beat North Dakota with a 3–0 shutout victory and advanced to the WCHA championship against Denver. Playing in the third game in three days, the Bulldogs shocked the crowd when the team defeated Denver with a 4–0 shutout win. The win over DU was the program's third WCHA Playoff Championship in the school's history and marked the first time that a 4th or 5th-seeded team had won the WCHA Final Five. The historic playoff run by UMD was punctuated by winning three games against ranked teams in three consecutive nights, including back-to-back shutouts from goaltender Alex Stalock; in addition to the shutouts, the Bulldogs allowed only three goals against through the entire WCHA playoffs.

With the WCHA title, Minnesota–Duluth secured an automatic bid to the 2009 NCAA Tournament. The Bulldogs entered tournament play and amazingly forced overtime by scoring two goals in the last 40 seconds of regulation and then scored in overtime for a 5–4 overtime win over Princeton. The team advanced to the West Regional final against first-ranked Miami (Ohio). In the game the RedHawks took a 2–0 lead into the third period when the team rallied back and scored late in the game.

The 2010–11 season marked a historic year for the UMD program. On December 30, 2010, the Bulldogs moved into the new 6,800-seat AMSOIL Arena located at the Duluth Entertainment Convention Center. In 2011, the Bulldogs earned an at-large NCAA Tournament bid. They reached the Frozen Four for the fourth time in the school's history with 2–0 and 5–3 wins over Union College and Yale University, respectively. UMD was the only Minnesota team competing in the 2011 Frozen Four at the Xcel Energy Center in St. Paul, essentially making it a home series for the team. On April 7, the Bulldogs defeated Notre Dame by a score of 4–3 to secure its first trip to the championship game since the 1983–84 season. On April 9, the Bulldogs beat the Michigan Wolverines 3–2 in overtime to win their first men's ice hockey championship in school history.

In the summer of 2011, Minnesota Duluth, along with five other schools, announced the formation of a new conference, known as the National Collegiate Hockey Conference (NCHC). The conference began competition for the 2013–14 season with six founding members: Colorado College, University of Denver, Miami University, University of Minnesota Duluth, University of Nebraska Omaha and University of North Dakota. In the 2011–12 season, the Bulldogs would again make it to the NCAA Tournament. The team defeated Maine by a score of 5–2, but lost to Boston College 4–0 the following evening in the regional finals. Jack Connolly was awarded the 2012 Hobey Baker award on April 6, 2012, for his performance during the season.

Minnesota-Duluth returned to the NCAA Tournament during the 2014–2015 season where they defeated the University of Minnesota 4–1 in the Northeast Regional Semi-final before losing to Boston University, 3–2, in the Northeast Regional Final.

In 2016–17, the Bulldogs compiled a 28–7–7 record and advanced to their first Frozen Four since 2011, but lost to Denver 3–2 in the national championship game.

In the 2017–2018 season, the Bulldogs defeated the Notre Dame Fighting Irish 2–1 to win the national championship.

In the 2018–2019 season, the Bulldogs defeated the UMass Minutemen 3–0 to win the national championship for the second year in a row, the first back-to-back national champions since Denver repeated in 2004 and 2005 and the first team to play in three straight National Championship games (2017, 2018, and 2019) since Boston College Eagles in 2006, 2007, and 2008.

== Season-by-season results ==
Source:

== Coaches ==
As of April 30, 2024

Tenure	Coach	Years	Record	Pct.
1930–1932	Frank Kovach	2	2–8–0	.200
1946–1947	Joe Oven	1	11–6–1	.639
1947–1951	Hank Jensen	4	19–9–1	.672
1951–1954	Gord Eddolls	3	21–17–0	.553
1954–1955	Bob Boyat	1	9–8–0	.529
1955–1959	Connie Pleban	4	56–25–5	.680
1959–1968	Ralph Romano	9	90–121–7	.429
1968–1970	Bill Selman	2	19–38–1	.336
1970–1975	Terry Shercliffe	5	82–92–7	.472
1975–1982	Gus Hendrickson	7	110–146–11	.433
1982–2000	Mike Sertich	18	350–328–44	.515
2000–Present	Scott Sandelin	25	469–408–104	.531
Totals	12 coaches	81 seasons	1,238–1,206–181	.506

== Statistical leaders ==
=== Career points leaders ===
Player	Years	GP	G	A	Pts	PIM
Dan Lempe	1976–1980	146	79	143	222	
Derek Plante	1989–1993	138	96	123	219	
Matt Christensen	1982–1986	168	76	143	219	
Bill Watson	1982–1985	108	89	121	210	
Gregg Moore	1979–1983	148	99	107	206	
Scott Carlston	1978–1982	147	87	116	203	
Thomas Milani	1972–1976	146	100	98	198	
Jack Connolly	2008–2012	166	66	131	197	
Keith Christiansen	1963–1967	102	75	121	196	
Tom Kurvers	1980–1984	164	43	149	192	

=== Career goaltending leaders ===
GP = Games played; Min = Minutes played; W = Wins; L = Losses; T = Ties; GA = Goals against; SO = Shutouts; SV% = Save percentage; GAA = Goals against average

Minimum 30 games

Player	Years	GP	Min	W	L	T	GA	SO	SV%	GAA
Hunter Shepard	2016–2020	119	7074	76	37	5	229	17	.922	1.94
Ryan Fanti	2019–2022	57	3371	31	19	6	113	7	.921	2.01
Kasimir Kaskisuo	2014–2016	75	4464	37	29	8	156	6	.920	2.10
Kenny Reiter	2009–2012	94	5433	52	26	11	215	9	.912	2.37
Alex Stalock	2006–2009	101	6068	39	44	17	251	9	.910	2.48

Statistics current through the start of the 2021–22 season.

== Players ==
=== Current roster ===
As of August 12, 2025.

No.	Nat.	Player	Class	Pos	Height	Weight	DoB	Hometown	Previous team	NHL rights
2	(United States)	Ty Hanson	Sophomore	D	5' 9" (1.75 m)	170 lb (77 kg)	2005-04-21	Hermantown, Minnesota	Sioux City Musketeers (USHL)	—
3	(United States)	Jake Toll	Freshman	D	6' 3" (1.91 m)	170 lb (77 kg)	2004-10-30	Rosemount, Minnesota	Muskegon Lumberjacks (USHL)	—
5	(United States)	Brady Cleveland	Junior	D	6' 5" (1.96 m)	211 lb (96 kg)	2005-04-01	Wausau, Wisconsin	Colorado College (NCHC)	DET, 47th overall 2023
6	(United States)	Adam Kleber	Sophomore	D	6' 6" (1.98 m)	214 lb (97 kg)	2006-03-24	Chaska, Minnesota	Lincoln Stars (USHL)	BUF, 42nd overall 2024
8	(United States)	Aaron Pionk	Junior	D	6' 0" (1.83 m)	175 lb (79 kg)	2003-01-16	Hermantown, Minnesota	Waterloo Black Hawks (USHL)	MIN, 149th overall 2023
10	(United States)	Max Plante	Sophomore	F	5' 11" (1.8 m)	176 lb (80 kg)	2006-02-20	Hermantown, Minnesota	USNTDP (USHL)	DET, 47th overall 2024
11	(United States)	Hunter Anderson	Freshman	F	5' 10" (1.78 m)	185 lb (84 kg)	2005-04-28	Manhattan Beach, California	Lincoln Stars (USHL)	—
13	(United States)	Daniel Shlaine	Freshman	F	6' 0" (1.83 m)	185 lb (84 kg)	2005-10-30	Moscow, Russia	Lincoln Stars (USHL)	—
16	(United States)	Blake Bechen	Sophomore	F	6' 0" (1.83 m)	187 lb (85 kg)	2005-01-25	Dubuque, Iowa	Green Bay Gamblers (USHL)	—
17	(United States)	Jayson Shaugabay	Sophomore	F	5' 9" (1.75 m)	165 lb (75 kg)	2005-04-05	Warroad, Minnesota	Green Bay Gamblers (USHL)	TBL, 115th overall 2023
18	(United States)	Joey Pierce	Senior	D	6' 0" (1.83 m)	208 lb (94 kg)	2002-10-02	Hermantown, Minnesota	Lincoln Stars (USHL)	—
19	(United States)	Harper Bentz	Sophomore	F	6' 0" (1.83 m)	176 lb (80 kg)	2004-11-29	Moorhead, Minnesota	Fargo Force (USHL)	—
20	(Canada)	Riley Bodnarchuk	Senior	D	6' 4" (1.93 m)	205 lb (93 kg)	2001-06-01	Okotoks, Alberta	Okotoks Oilers (AJHL)	—
21	(Canada)	Braden Fischer	Junior	F	6' 1" (1.85 m)	185 lb (84 kg)	2002-10-02	Winnipeg, Manitoba	Minot Minotauros (NAHL)	—
22	(Canada)	Ryan Zaremba	Freshman	F	5' 9" (1.75 m)	179 lb (81 kg)	2006-03-30	Balgonie, Saskatchewan	Fargo Force (USHL)	—
23	(United States)	Kyle Gaffney	Senior	F	6' 0" (1.83 m)	180 lb (82 kg)	2001-09-05	Plymouth, Michigan	Alaska (NCAA)	—
24	(Canada)	Scout Truman	Senior	F	5' 10" (1.78 m)	185 lb (84 kg)	2002-10-15	Lethbridge, Alberta	Massachusetts Lowell (HEA)	—
25	(Canada)	Callum Arnott	Sophomore	F	6' 1" (1.85 m)	170 lb (77 kg)	2004-01-12	King City, Ontario	Penticton Vees (BCHL)	—
27	(United States)	Zam Plante	Sophomore	F	5' 11" (1.8 m)	176 lb (80 kg)	2004-08-24	Hermantown, Minnesota	Fargo Force (USHL)	PIT, 150th overall 2022
28	(Canada)	Luke Bibby	Freshman	F	6' 0" (1.83 m)	170 lb (77 kg)	2004-10-29	Brantford, Ontario	Brooks Bandits (BCHL)	—
30	(Slovakia)	Adam Gajan	Sophomore	G	6' 3" (1.91 m)	187 lb (85 kg)	2004-05-06	Poprad, Slovakia	Green Bay Gamblers (USHL)	CHI, 35th overall 2023
35	(United States)	Ethan Dahlmeir	Sophomore	G	6' 4" (1.93 m)	216 lb (98 kg)	2003-09-07	Lakeville, Minnesota	Miami (NCHC)	—
36	(Canada)	Cole Sheffield	Freshman	G	6' 0" (1.83 m)	176 lb (80 kg)	2004-05-08	London, Ontario	Dauphin Kings (MJHL)	—
37	(Canada)	Grayden Siepmann	Freshman	D	5' 11" (1.8 m)	181 lb (82 kg)	2004-05-26	Windsor, Ontario	Saskatoon Blades (WHL)	—
38	(Canada)	Kyler Kovich	Graduate	F	6' 2" (1.88 m)	182 lb (83 kg)	2002-01-31	Coquitlam, British Columbia	Cornell (ECAC)	—
39	(United States)	Trevor Stachowiak	Sophomore	F	6' 2" (1.88 m)	196 lb (89 kg)	2003-02-25	Dallas, Texas	Minot Minotauros (NAHL)	—

== Olympians ==
This is a list of Minnesota–Duluth alumni who have played on an Olympic team.

Name	Position	Minnesota–Duluth Tenure	Team	Year	Finish
Keith Christiansen	Center	1963–1967	(United States) USA	1972	Silver
John Harrington	Forward	1975–1979	(United States) USA	1980, 1984	Gold, 7th
Mark Pavelich	Forward	1976–1979	(United States) USA	1980	Gold
Bob Mason	Goaltender	1981–1983	(United States) USA	1984	7th
Thomas Milani	Right wing	1972–1976	(Italy) ITA	1948	9th
Guy Gosselin	Defenseman	1982–1987	(United States) USA	1988, 1992	7th, 4th
Curt Giles	Defenseman	1975–1979	(Canada) CAN	1992	Silver
Chris Lindberg	Right wing	1987–1989	(Canada) CAN	1992	Silver
Mike DeAngelis	Defenseman	1984–1988	(Italy) ITA	1992, 1994, 1998	12th, 9th, 12th
Brett Hull	Right wing	1984–1986	(United States) USA	1998, 2002	6th, Silver
Justin Faulk	Defenseman	2010–2011	(United States) USA	2014	4th
Mason Raymond	Left wing	2005–2007	(Canada) CAN	2018	Bronze
Noah Cates	Left wing	2018–2022	(United States) USA	2022	5th

== Awards and honors ==
=== Hockey Hall of Fame ===
- Brett Hull (2009)

=== United States Hockey Hall of Fame ===
- Connie Pleban (1990)
- Dave Langevin (1993)
- Keith Christiansen (2005)
- Brett Hull (2008)

=== NCAA ===
==== Individual awards ====
Hobey Baker Award

- Tom Kurvers, D: 1984
- Bill Watson, RW: 1985
- Chris Marinucci, LW: 1994
- Junior Lessard, RW: 2004
- Jack Connolly, C: 2012
- Scott Perunovich, D: 2020
- Max Plante, LW: 2026

Spencer Penrose Award

- Mike Sertich: 1984
- Scott Sandelin: 2004

Tim Taylor Award

- Scott Perunovich: 2018

Derek Hines Unsung Hero Award

- Kyle Schmidt: 2011

NCAA Division I Ice Hockey Scoring Champion

- Bill Watson, RW: 1985
- Junior Lessard, F: 2004

Tournament Most Outstanding Player

- J. T. Brown, RW; 2011
- Karson Kuhlman, C; 2018
- Parker Mackay, RW; 2019

==== All-Americans ====
AHCA First Team All-Americans

- 1965–66: Bob Hill, D
- 1966–67: Keith Christiansen, F
- 1969–70: Ron Busniuk, D; Murray Keogan, F
- 1970–71: Walt Ledingham, F
- 1971–72: Walt Ledingham, F
- 1972–73: Pat Boutette, F
- 1977–78: Curt Giles, D
- 1978–79: Curt Giles, D; Mark Pavelich, F
- 1983–84: Tom Kurvers, D; Bill Watson, F
- 1984–85: Rick Kosti, G; Norm Maciver, D; Bill Watson, F
- 1985–86: Norm Maciver, D
- 1989–90: Chad Erickson, G
- 1992–93: Brett Hauer, D; Derek Plante, F
- 1993–94: Chris Marinucci, F
- 2003–04: Junior Lessard, F
- 2008–09: Alex Stalock, G
- 2010–11: Jack Connolly, F
- 2011–12: Jack Connolly, F
- 2016–17: Alex Iafallo, F
- 2017–18: Scott Perunovich, D
- 2018–19: Hunter Shepard, G
- 2019–20: Scott Perunovich, D

AHCA Second Team All-Americans

- 1983–84: Rick Kosti, G; Bob Lakso, F
- 1985–86: Matt Christensen, F
- 1987–88: Mike DeAngelis, D
- 2003–04: Beau Geisler, D
- 2009–10: Jack Connolly, F
- 2010–11: Mike Connolly, F
- 2011–12: J. T. Brown, F
- 2018–19: Scott Perunovich, D
- 2019–20: Hunter Shepard, G; Noah Cates, F; Cole Koepke, F

=== WCHA ===
==== Individual awards ====
Player of the Year

- Keith Christiansen, F: 1967
- Bob Mason, G: 1983
- Tom Kurvers, D: 1984
- Bill Watson, F: 1985
- Derek Plante, F: 1993
- Chris Marinucci, F: 1994
- Junior Lessard, F: 2004
- Jack Connolly, F: 2012

Outstanding Student-Athlete of the Year

- Brett Hauer, D: 1993
- Jeff Scissons, F: 2000

Coach of the Year

- Mike Sertich: 1983, 1984, 1985, 1993
- Scott Sandelin: 2004

Freshman of the Year

- Murray Keogan, F: 1970
- Rick Kosti, G: 1984
- Brett Hull, F: 1985
- Brant Nicklin, G: 1997

Most Valuable Player in Tournament

- Alex Stalock, G: 2009

==== All-Conference Teams ====
First Team All-WCHA

- 1966–67: Keith Christiansen, F
- 1969–70: Ron Busniuk, D; Murray Keogan, F
- 1970–71: Walt Ledingham, F
- 1974–75: Gord McDonald, D
- 1977–78: Curt Giles, D
- 1978–79: Curt Giles, D; Mark Pavelich, F
- 1982–83: Bob Mason, G
- 1983–84: Tom Kurvers, D; Bill Watson, F
- 1984–85: Rick Kosti, G; Norm Maciver, D; Bill Watson, F
- 1985–86: Norm Maciver, D; Brett Hull, F
- 1987–88: Mike DeAngelis, D
- 1989–90: Chad Erickson, G
- 1991–92: Greg Andrusak, D
- 1992–93: Brett Hauer, D; Derek Plante, F
- 1993–94: Chris Marinucci, F
- 2001–02: Andy Reierson, D
- 2003–04: Beau Geisler, D; Junior Lessard, F
- 2006–07: Matt Niskanen, D; Mason Raymond, F
- 2008–09: Alex Stalock, G
- 2009–10: Jack Connolly, F
- 2010–11: Jack Connolly, F; Mike Connolly, F
- 2011–12: Jack Connolly, F; J. T. Brown, F
- 2016–17: Alex Iafallo, F
- 2017–18: Scott Perunovich, D
- 2018–19: Hunter Shepard, G

Second Team All-WCHA

- 1965–66: Bob Hill, D
- 1970–71: Chico Resch, G
- 1971–72: Walt Ledingham, F
- 1972–73: Pat Boutette, F
- 1973–74: Gord McDonald, D
- 1974–75: Thomas Milani, F
- 1975–76: Dave Langevin, D; Thomas Milani, F
- 1976–77: Dan Lempe, F
- 1979–80: Dan Lempe, F
- 1981–82: Gregg Moore, F
- 1982–83: Gregg Moore, F
- 1983–84: Rick Kosti, G; Norm Maciver, D; Tom Herzig, F; Bob Lakso, F; Matt Christensen, F
- 1984–85: Matt Christensen, F
- 1986–87: Guy Gosselin, D
- 1991–92: Derek Plante, F
- 1992–93: Jon Rohloff, D; Chris Marinucci, F
- 1994–95: Brad Federenko, F
- 1996–97: Rick Mrozik, F; Mike Peluso, F
- 2001–02: Judd Medak, F
- 2003–04: Isaac Reichmuth, G; Evan Schwabe, F
- 2004–05: Evan Schwabe, F
- 2008–09: Justin Fontaine, F
- 2009–10: Justin Fontaine, F
- 2010–11: Justin Fontaine, F
- 2011–12: Kenny Reiter, G

Third Team All-WCHA

- 1995–96: Teras Lendzyk, G; Mike Peluso, F
- 1997–98: Mike Peluso, F
- 2002–03: Isaac Reichmuth, G
- 2008–09: Josh Meyers, D
- 2010–11: Justin Faulk, D
- 2011–12: Travis Oleksuk, F

All-WCHA Rookie Team

- 1993–94: Brad Federenko, F
- 1994–95: Mike Peluso, F
- 1996–97: Brant Nicklin, G; Curtis Doell, D
- 1997–98: Ryan Coole, D
- 2002–03: Isaac Reichmuth, G
- 2005–06: Mason Raymond, F
- 2006–07: Alex Stalock, G
- 2008–09: Mike Connolly, F
- 2010–11: Justin Faulk, D; J. T. Brown, F
- 2012–13: Andrew Welinski, D; Tony Cameranesi, F

=== NCHC ===
==== Individual awards ====
NCHC Player of the Year

- Scott Perunovich; 2020
- Max Plante; 2026

NCHC Forward of the Year

- Max Plante; 2026

NCHC Rookie of the Year

- Scott Perunovich; 2018

NCHC Goaltender of the Year

- Hunter Shepard; 2019, 2020
- Ryan Fanti; 2022

NCHC Offensive Defenseman of the Year

- Scott Perunovich; 2018, 2019, 2020

NCHC Defensive Defenseman of the Year

- Adam Kleber; 2026

NCHC Defensive Forward of the Year

- Dominic Toninato; 2017
- Justin Richards; 2019, 2020

NCHC Sportsmanship Award

- Cal Decowski; 2016
- Karson Kuhlman; 2018
- Kobe Roth; 2020
- Darian Gotz; 2024

Frozen Faceoff MVP

- Alex Iafallo; 2017
- Hunter Sheppard; 2019
- Ryan Fanti; 2022

==== All-Conference Teams ====
First Team All-NCHC

- 2016–17: Alex Iafallo, F
- 2017–18: Scott Perunovich, D
- 2018–19: Hunter Shepard, G; Scott Perunovich, D
- 2019–20: Hunter Shepard, G; Scott Perunovich, D; Noah Cates, F; Cole Koepke, F
- 2020–21: Nick Swaney, F
- 2022–22: Ryan Fanti, G
- 2025–26: Max Plante, F

Second team All-NCHC

- 2014–15: Andy Welinski, D
- 2015–16: Andy Welinski, D
- 2016–17: Hunter Miska, G; Neal Pionk, D
- 2017–18: Hunter Shepard, G
- 2018–19: Justin Richards, F
- 2020–21: Noah Cates, F
- 2022–23: Wyatt Kaiser, D
- 2023–24: Ben Steeves, F

NCHC All-Rookie Team

- 2013–14: Alex Iafallo, F
- 2014–15: Kasmir Kasisuo, G
- 2016–17: Joey Anderson, F
- 2017–18: Scott Perunovich, D
- 2020–21: Wyatt Kaiser, D
- 2022–23: Ben Steeves, F
- 2024–25: Max Plante, F

== Bulldogs in the NHL ==
As of July 1, 2025.

= NHL All-Star team	= NHL All-Star	= NHL All-Star and NHL All-Star team	= Hall of Famers

Player	Position	Team(s)	Years	Games	Stanley Cups
Joey Anderson	Right wing	NJD, TOR, CHI	2018–Present	169	0
Mikey Anderson	Defenseman	LAK	2018–Present	345	0
Greg Andrusak	Defenseman	PIT, TOR	1993–2000	28	0
Pat Boutette	Center	TOR, HFD, PIT	1975–1985	756	0
J. T. Brown	Right wing	TBL, ANA, MIN	2011–2019	365	0
Ron Busniuk	Center	BUF	1972–1974	6	0
Jackson Cates	Center	PHI	2020–2023	20	0
Noah Cates	Left wing	PHI	2021–Present	235	0
Mike Connolly	Center	COL	2011–2012	2	0
Chad Erickson	Goaltender	NJD	1991–1992	2	0
Justin Faulk	Defenseman	CAR, STL, DET	2011–Present	980	0
Jesse Fibiger	Defenseman	SJS	2002–2003	16	0
Rusty Fitzgerald	Center	PIT	1994–1996	25	0
Justin Fontaine	Right wing	MIN	2013–2016	197	0
Jason Garrison	Defenseman	FLA, VAN, TBL, VGK, EDM	2008–2019	555	0
Curt Giles	Defenseman	MNS, NYR, STL	1979–1993	895	0
Guy Gosselin	Defenseman	WPG	1987–1988	5	0
Brett Hauer	Defenseman	EDM, NSH	1995–2002	37	0
Mark Heaslip	Right wing	NYR, LAK	1980–1992	117	0
Rick Heinz	Goaltender	STL, VAN	1980–1985	49	0
Phil Hoene	Center	LAK	1972–1975	37	0
Greg Hubick	Defenseman	TOR, VAN	1975–1980	77	0
Brett Hull	Right wing	CGY, STL, DAL, DET, PHO	1985–2006	1,269	2
Alex Iafallo	Left wing	LAK, WPG	2017–Present	584	0
Adam Johnson	Center	PIT	2018–2020	13	0
Jim Johnson	Defenseman	PIT, MNS, DAL, WSH, PHO	1985–1998	829	0
Wyatt Kaiser	Defenseman	CHI	2022–Present	98	0
Kasimir Kaskisuo	Goaltender	TOR, NSH	2019–2021	2	0
Cole Koepke	Left Wing	TBL, BOS	2022–Present	99	0
Karson Kuhlman	Center	BOS, SEA, WIN	2018–2023	147	0
Tom Kurvers	Defenseman	MTL, BUF, NJD, TOR, VAN, NYI, ANA	1984–1995	659	1
Dave Langevin	Defenseman	NYI , MNS, LAK	1979–1987	513	4
Walt Ledingham	Left wing	CHI, NYI	1972–1977	15	0
Junior Lessard	Right wing	DAL, TBL	2005–2008	27	0
Chris Lindberg	Left wing	CGY, QUE	1991–1994	116	0

Player	Position	Team(s)	Years	Games	Stanley Cups
Norm Maciver	Defenseman	NYR, HFD, EDM, OTT, PIT, WPG, PHO	1986–1998	500	0
Chris Marinucci	Center	NYI, LAK	1994–1997	13	0
Bob Mason	Goaltender	WSH, CHI, QUE, VAN	1983–1991	145	0
Hunter Miska	Goaltender	ARI, COL	2018–2021	6	0
Jerome Mrazek	Goaltender	PHI	1975–1976	1	0
Rick Mrozik	Defenseman	CGY	2002–2003	2	0
Matt Niskanen	Defenseman	DAL, PIT, WSH, PHI	2007–2020	949	1
Evan Oberg	Defenseman	VAN, TBL	2009–2012	7	0
Dylan Olsen	Defenseman	CHI, FLA	2011–2016	124	0
Mark Pavelich	Forward	NYR, MNS, SJS	1981–1992	355	0
Mike Peluso	Right wing	CHI, PHI	2001–2004	38	0
Scott Perunovich	Defenseman	STL, NYI	2021–Present	108	0
Neal Pionk	Defenseman	NYR, WPG	2017–Present	536	0
Derek Plante	Center	BUF, DAL, CHI, PHI	1993–2001	450	1
Shjon Podein	Left wing	EDM, PHI, COL, STL	1992–2003	699	1
Mason Raymond	Left wing	VAN, TOR, CGY, ANA	2007–2017	546	0
Justin Richards	Center	NYR, CBJ	2020–2023	3	0
Chico Resch	Goaltender	NYI , COR, NJD, PHI	1973–1987	571	1
Jon Rohloff	Defenseman	BOS	1994–1997	150	0
Jay Rosehill	Left wing	TOR, PHI	2009–2014	117	0
Dylan Samberg	Defenseman	WPG	2021–Present	216	0
MacGregor Sharp	Center	ANA	2009–2010	8	0
Hunter Shepard	Goaltender	WSH	2023–Present	5	0
Carson Soucy	Defenseman	MIN, SEA, VAN, NYR	2017–Present	365	0
Alex Stalock	Goaltender	SJS, MIN, CHI	2010–Present	179	0
Tim Stapleton	Right wing	TOR, ATL, WIN	2008–2012	118	0
Nick Swaney	Right wing	MIN	2022–2023	1	0
Dominic Toninato	Center	COL, FLA, WIN	2017–Present	189	0
Sean Toomey	Center	MNS	1986–1987	1	0
Riley Tufte	Left wing	DAL, COL, BOS	2021–Present	24	0
Dennis Vaske	Defenseman	NYI, BOS	1990–1999	235	0
Bill Watson	Forward	CHI	1985–1989	115	0
Andy Welinski	Defenseman	ANA	2017–2021	46	0
Craig Weller	Left wing	PHO, MIN	2007–2009	95	0

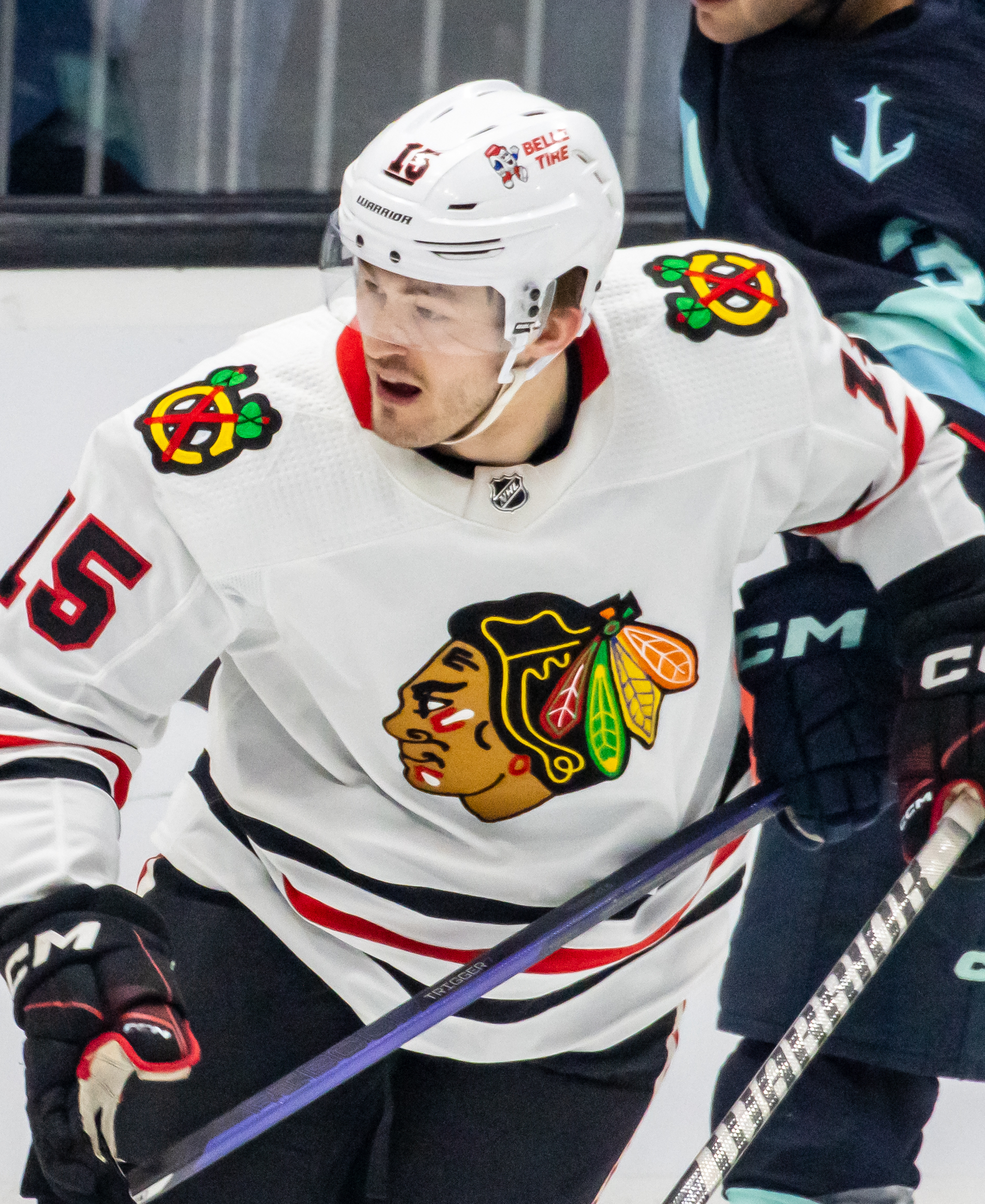
Joey Anderson

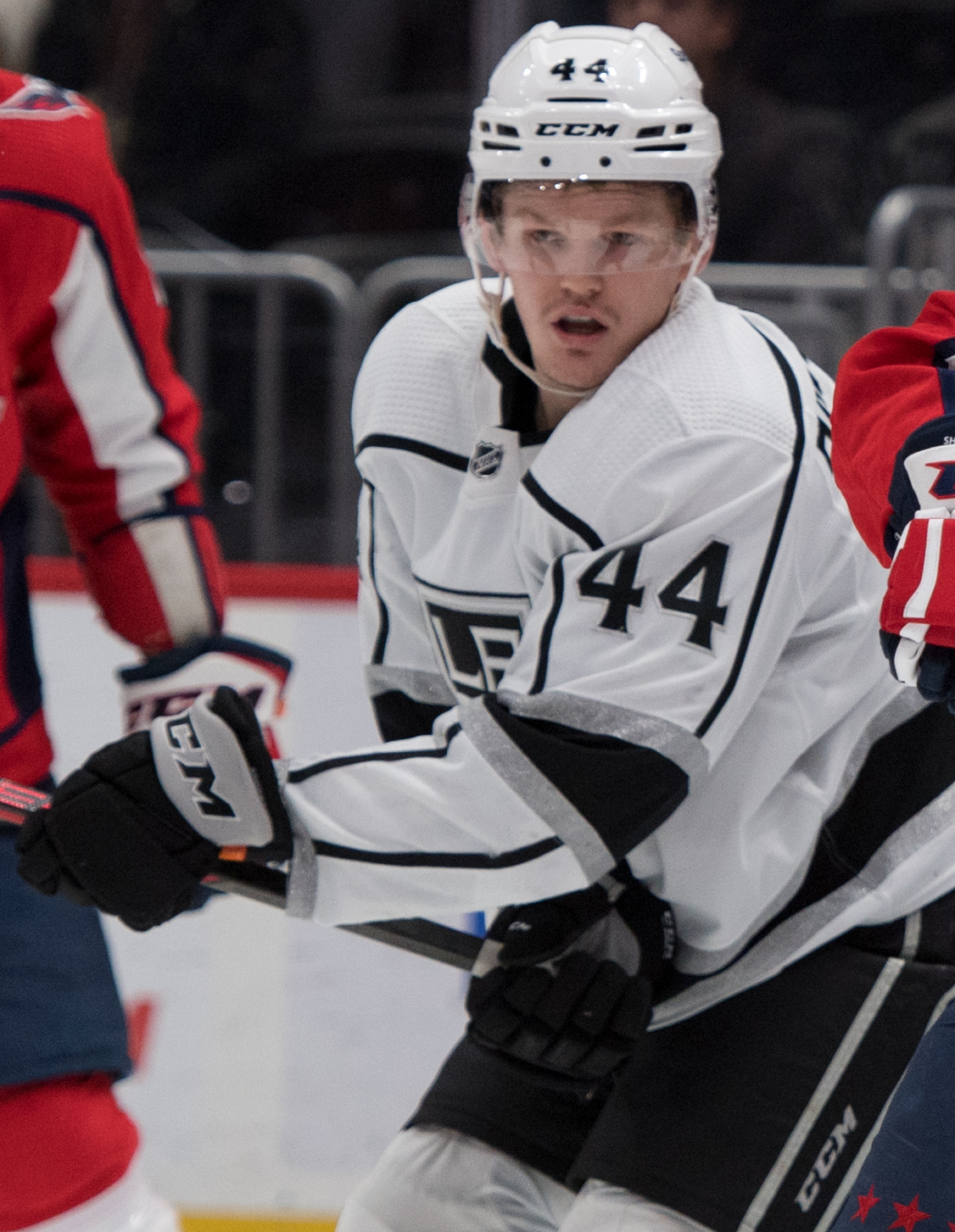
Mikey Anderson

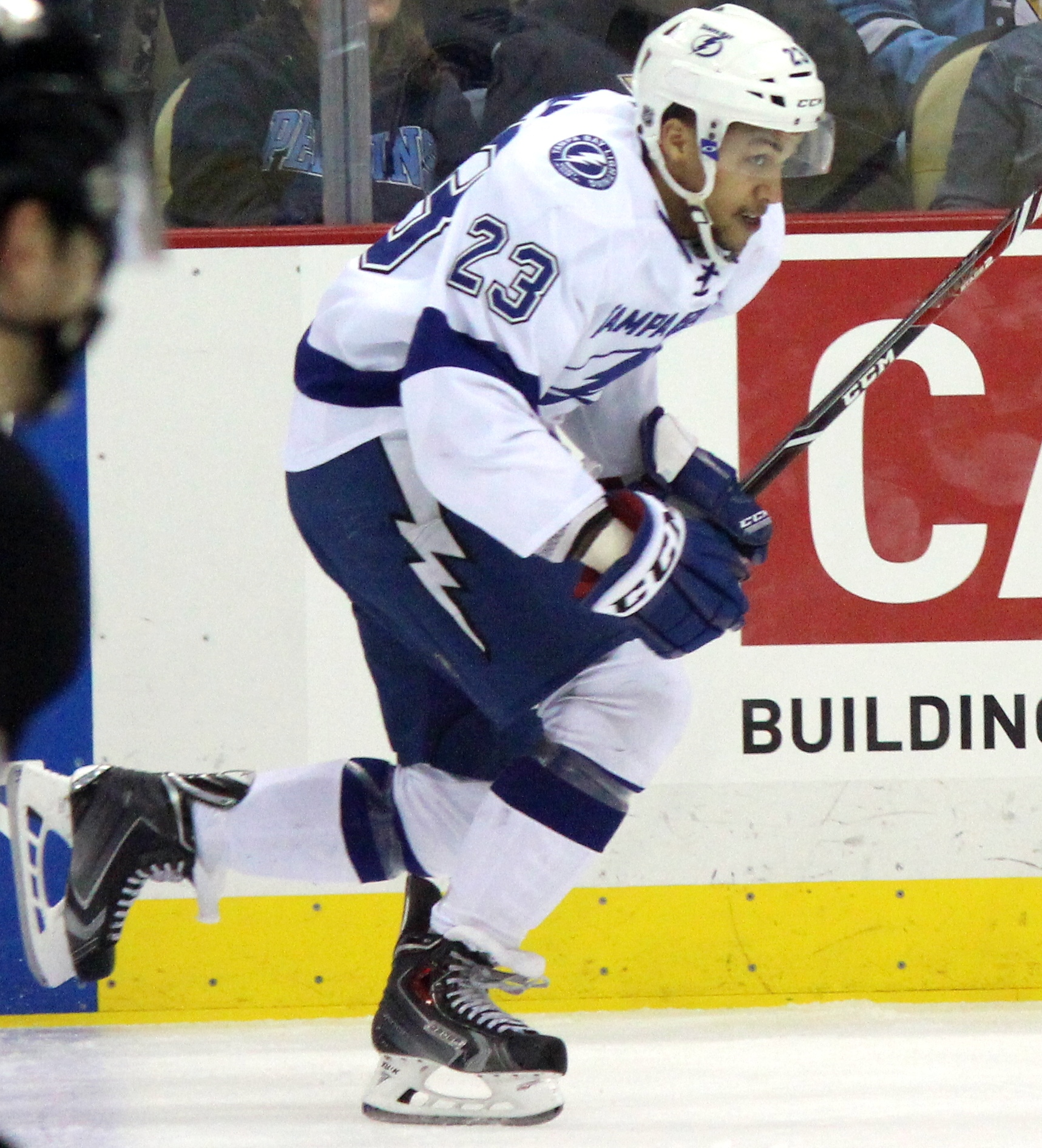
J. T. Brown

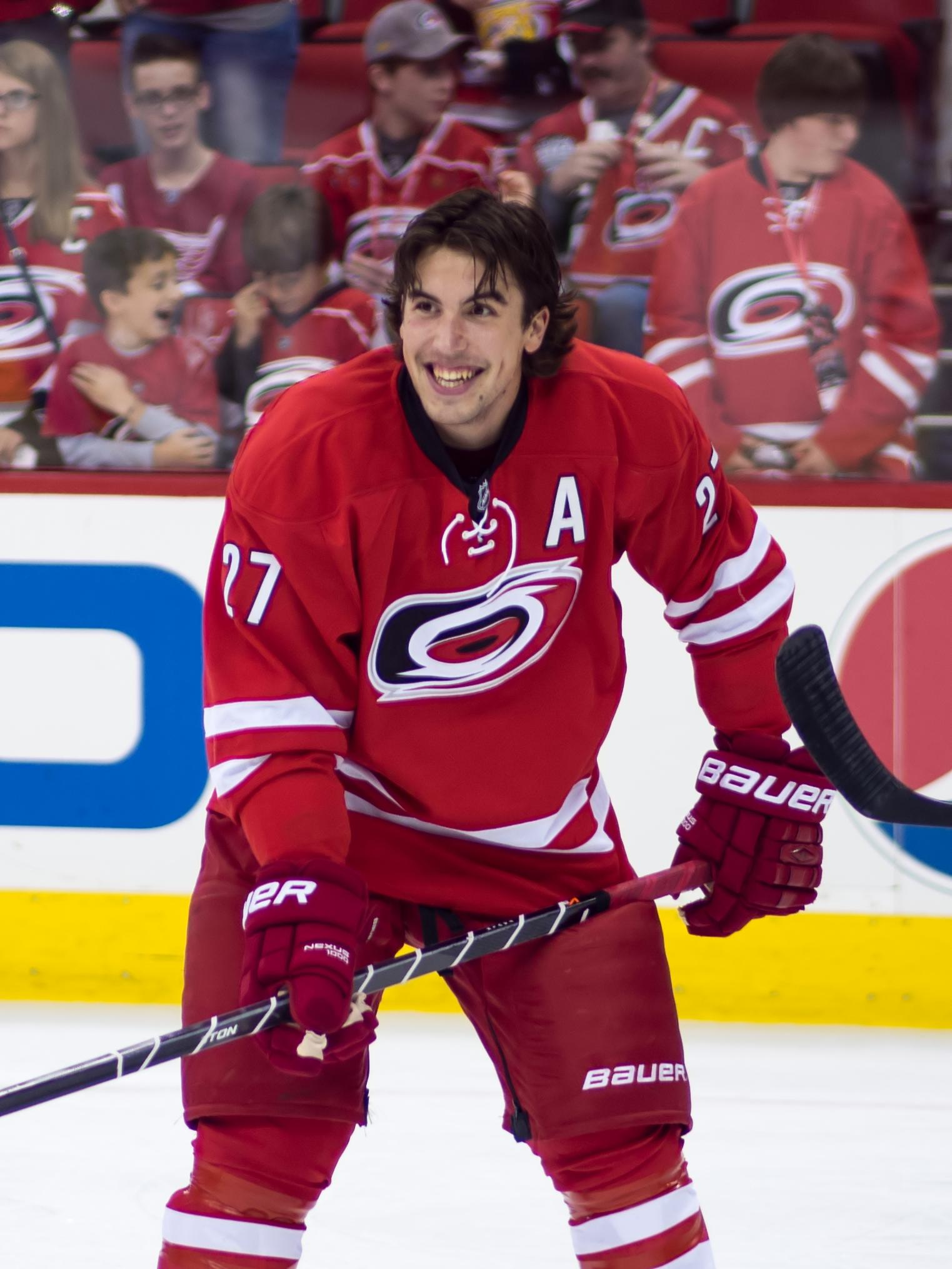
Justin Faulk

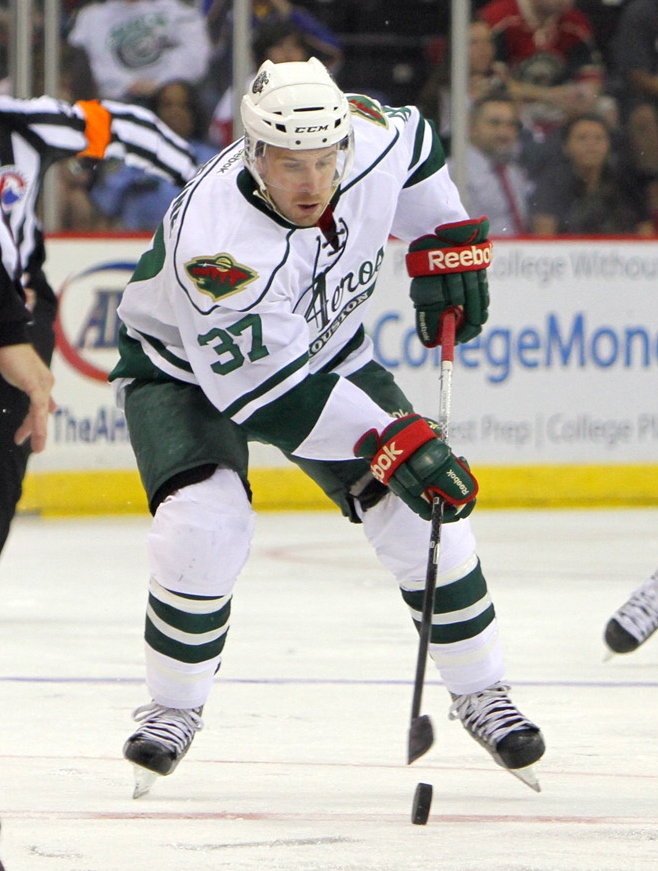
Justin Fontaine

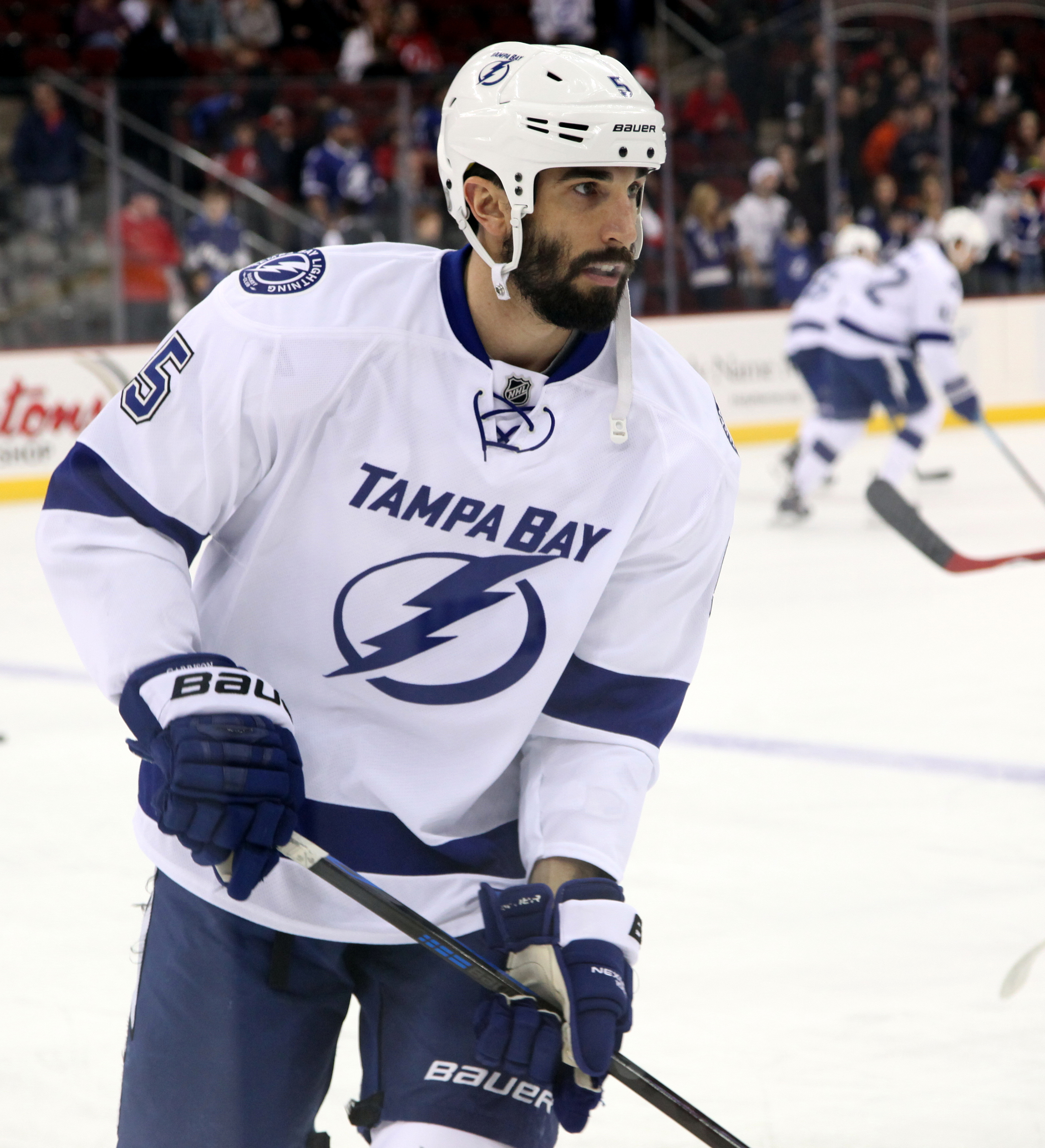
Jason Garrison

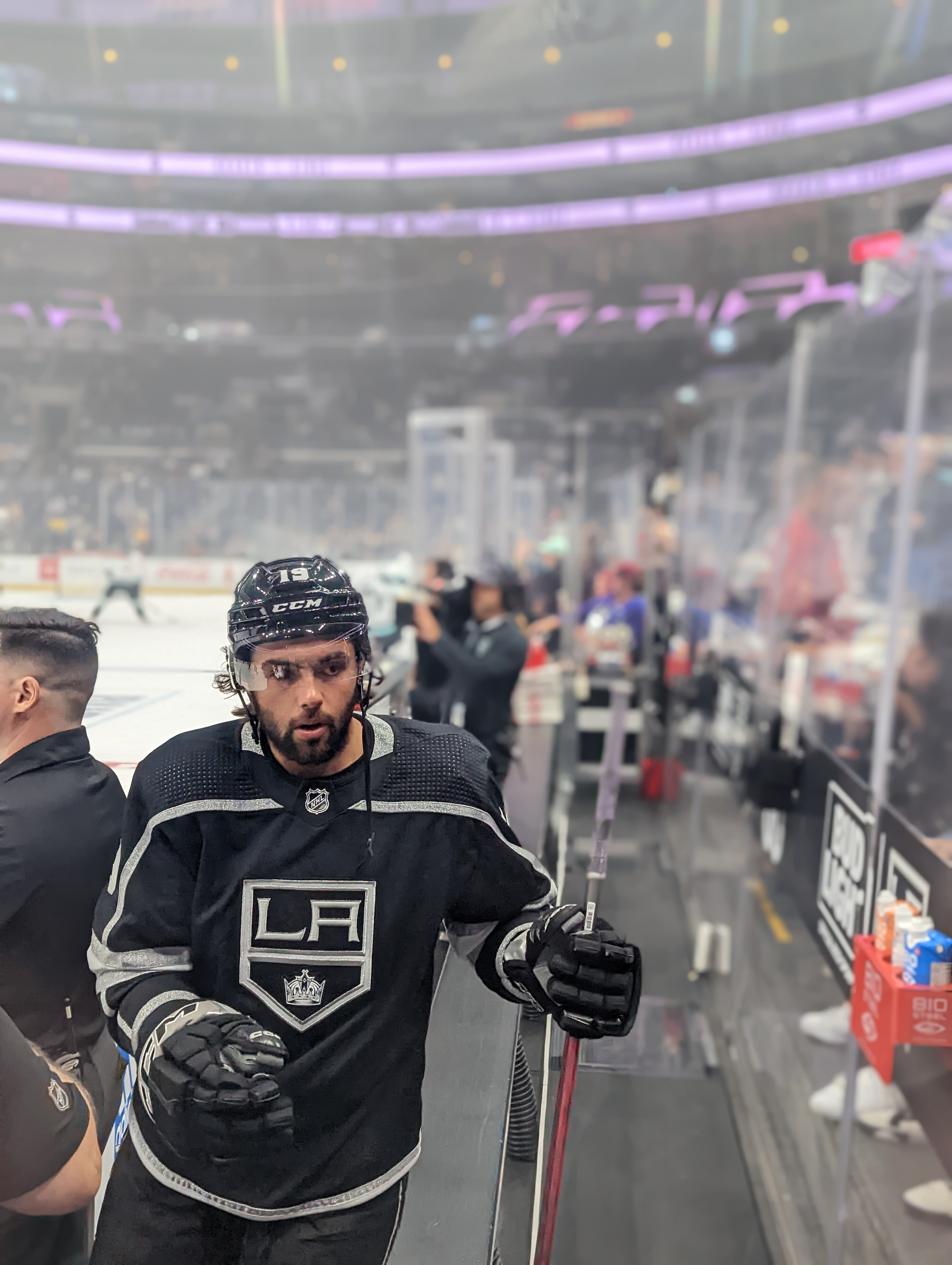
Alex Iafallo

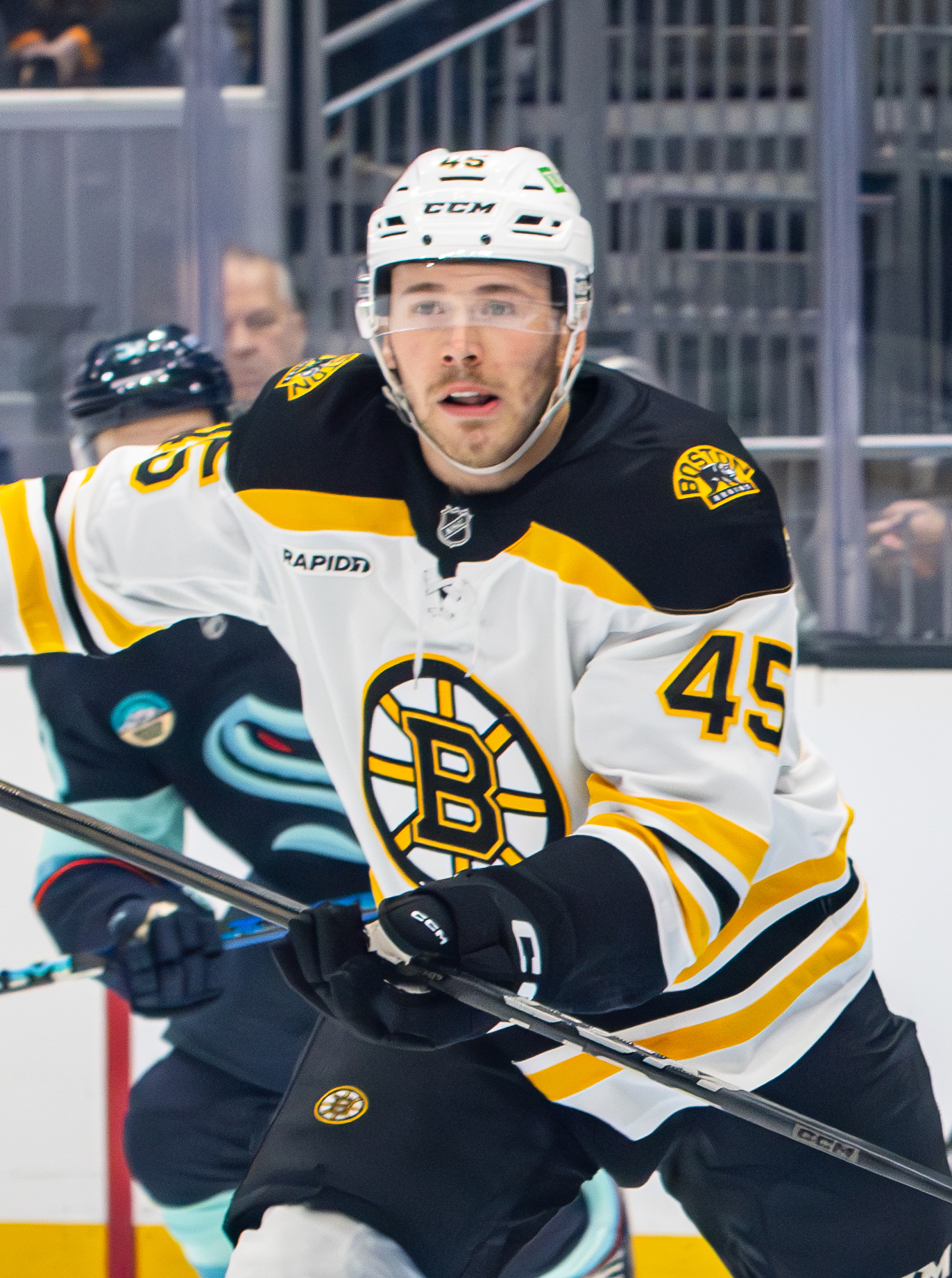
Cole Koepke

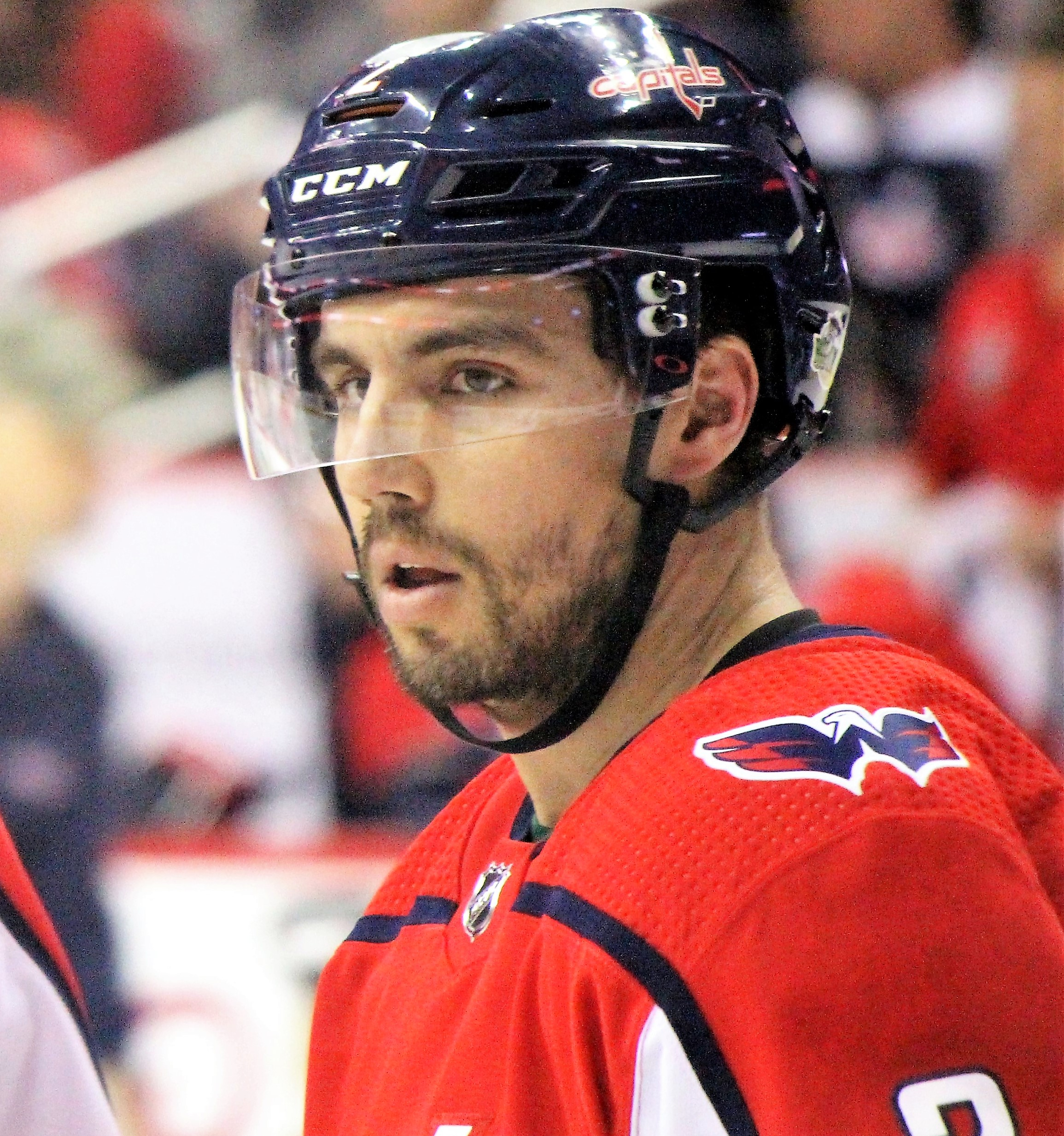
Matt Niskanen

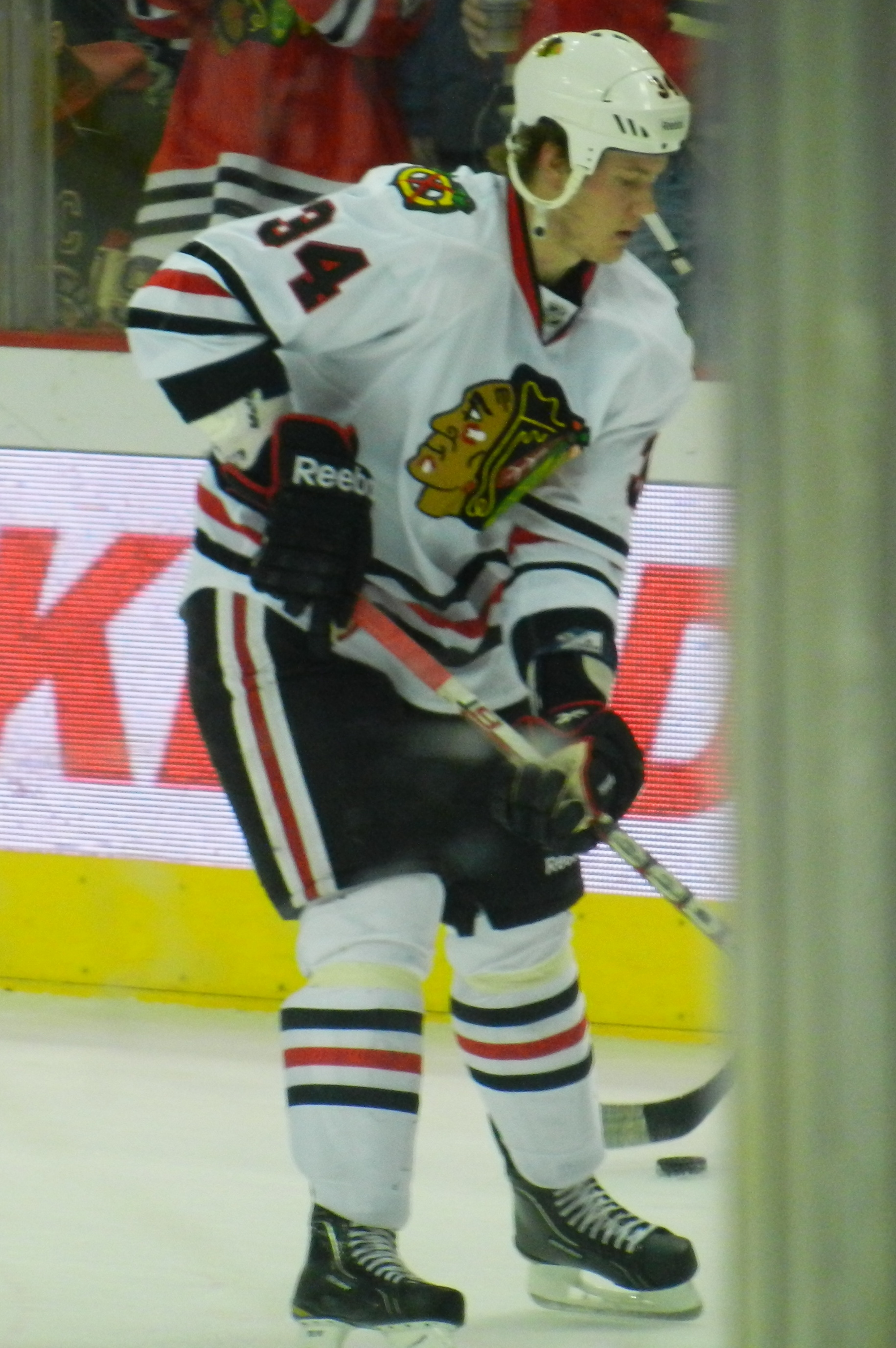
Dylan Olsen

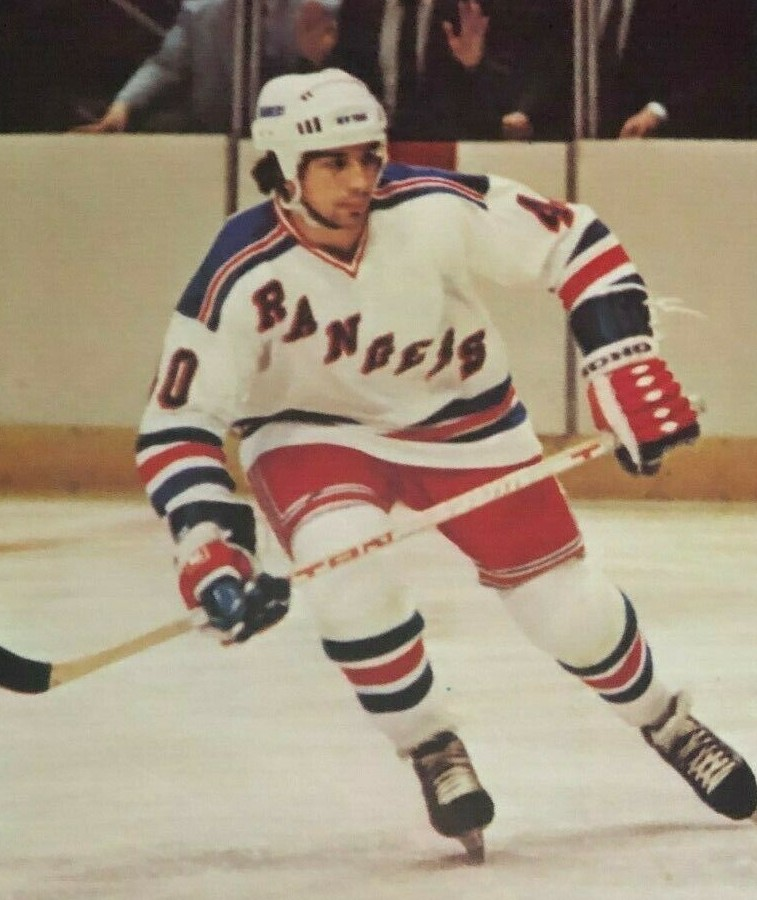
Mark Pavelich

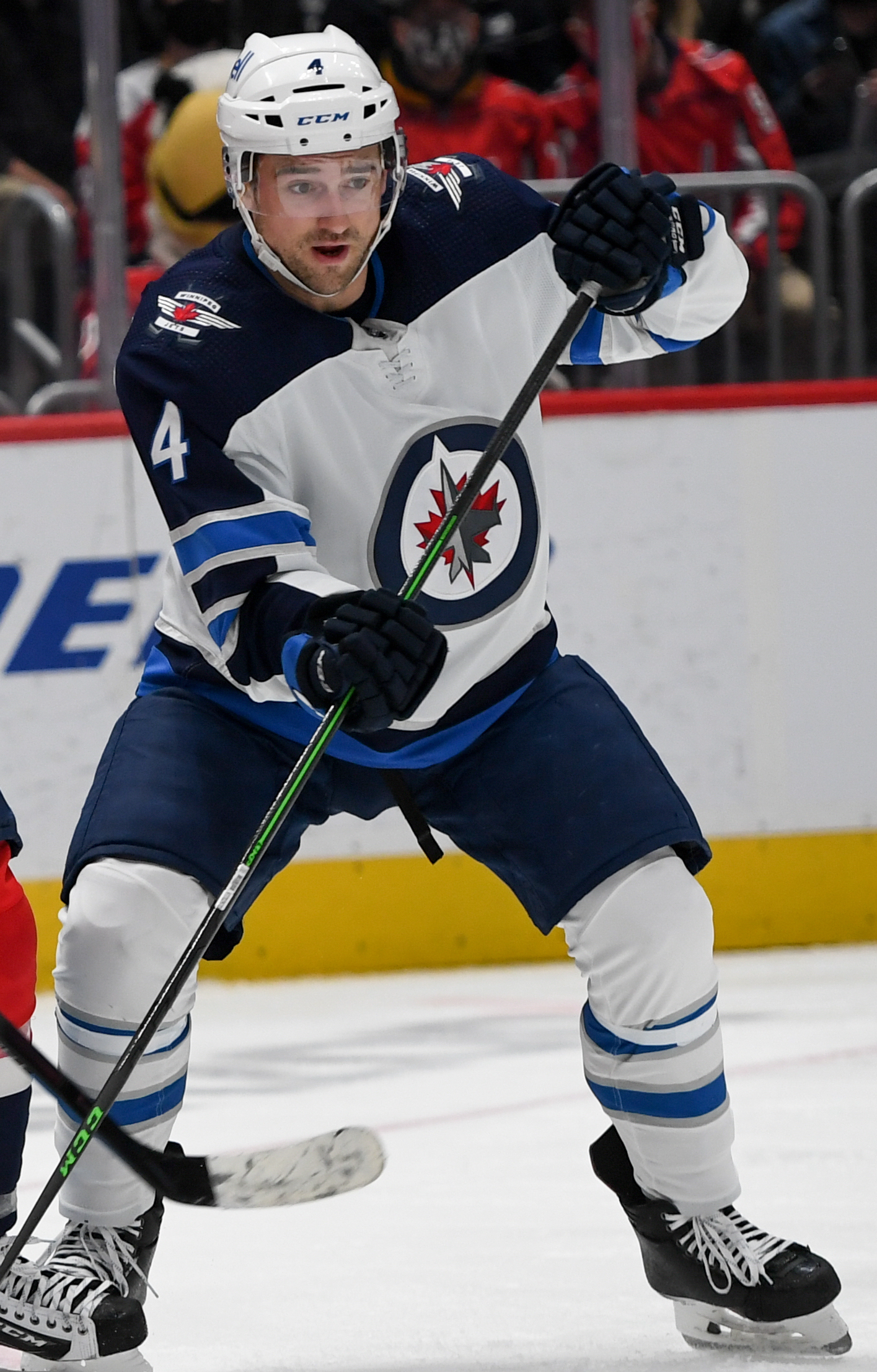
Neal Pionk

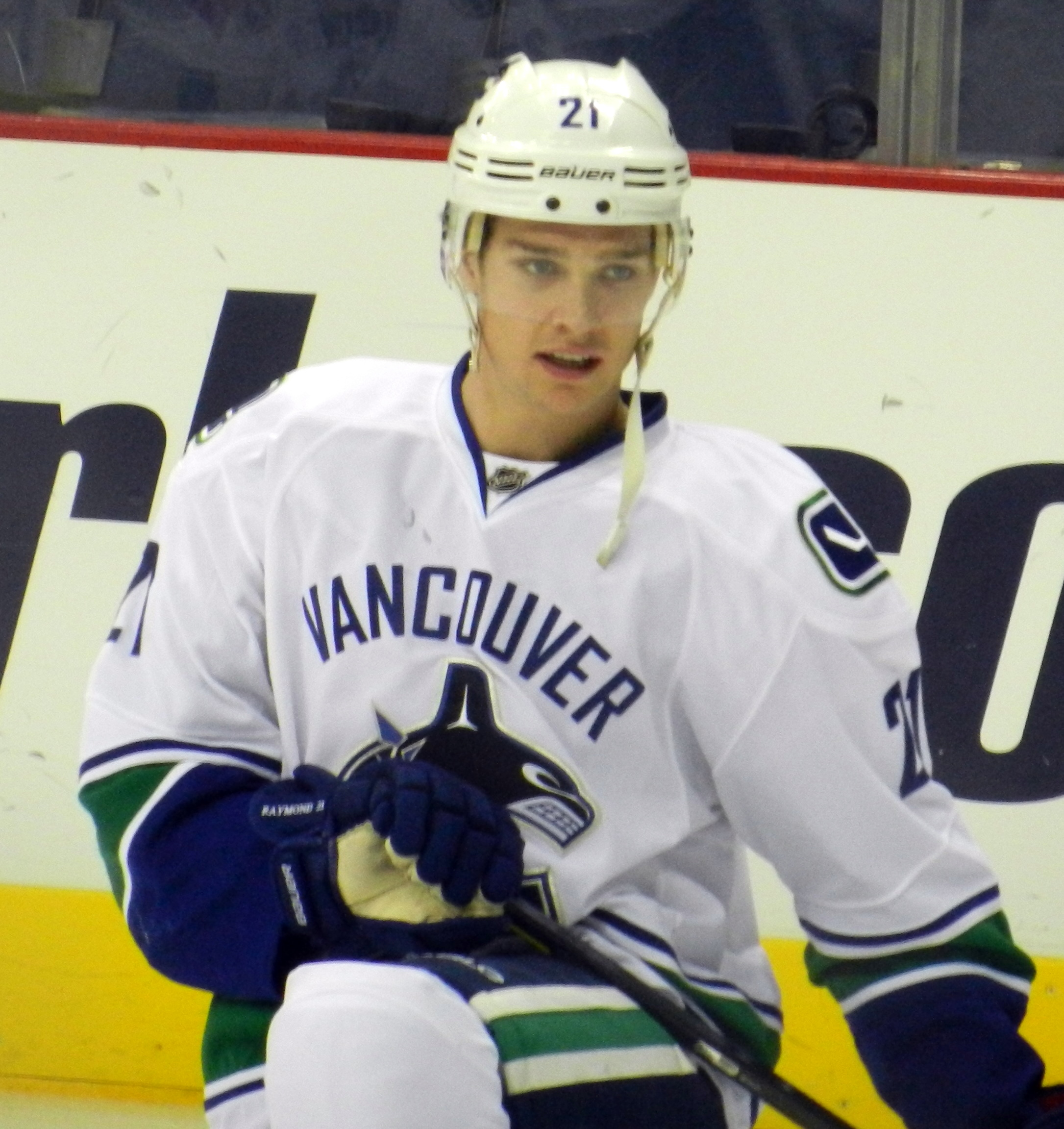
Mason Raymond

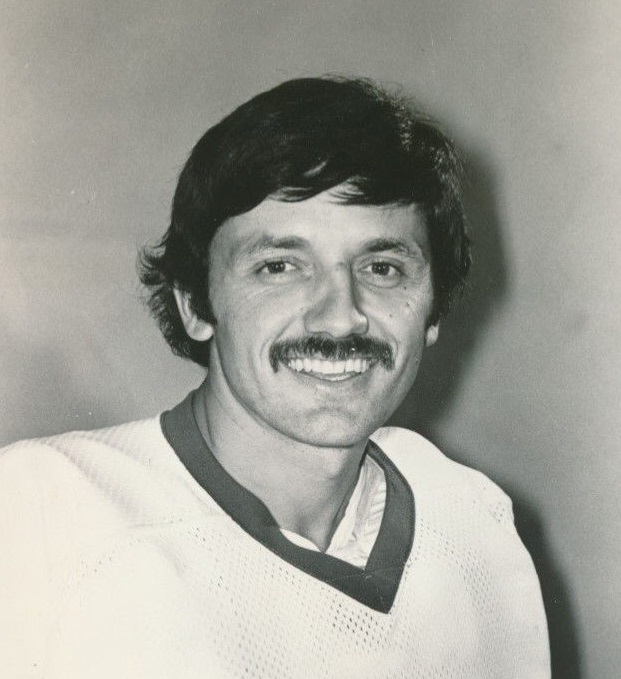
Chico Resch

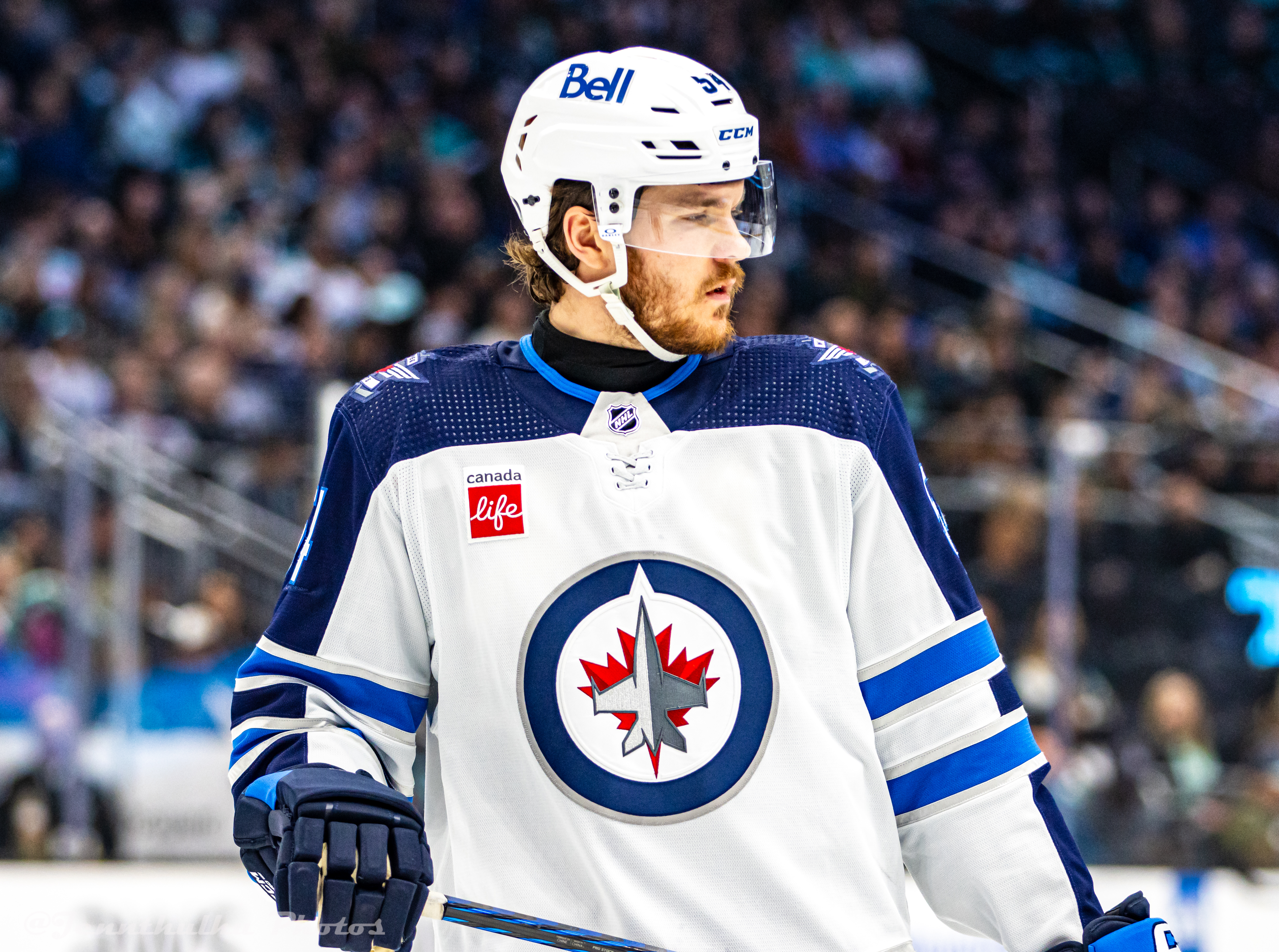
Dylan Samberg

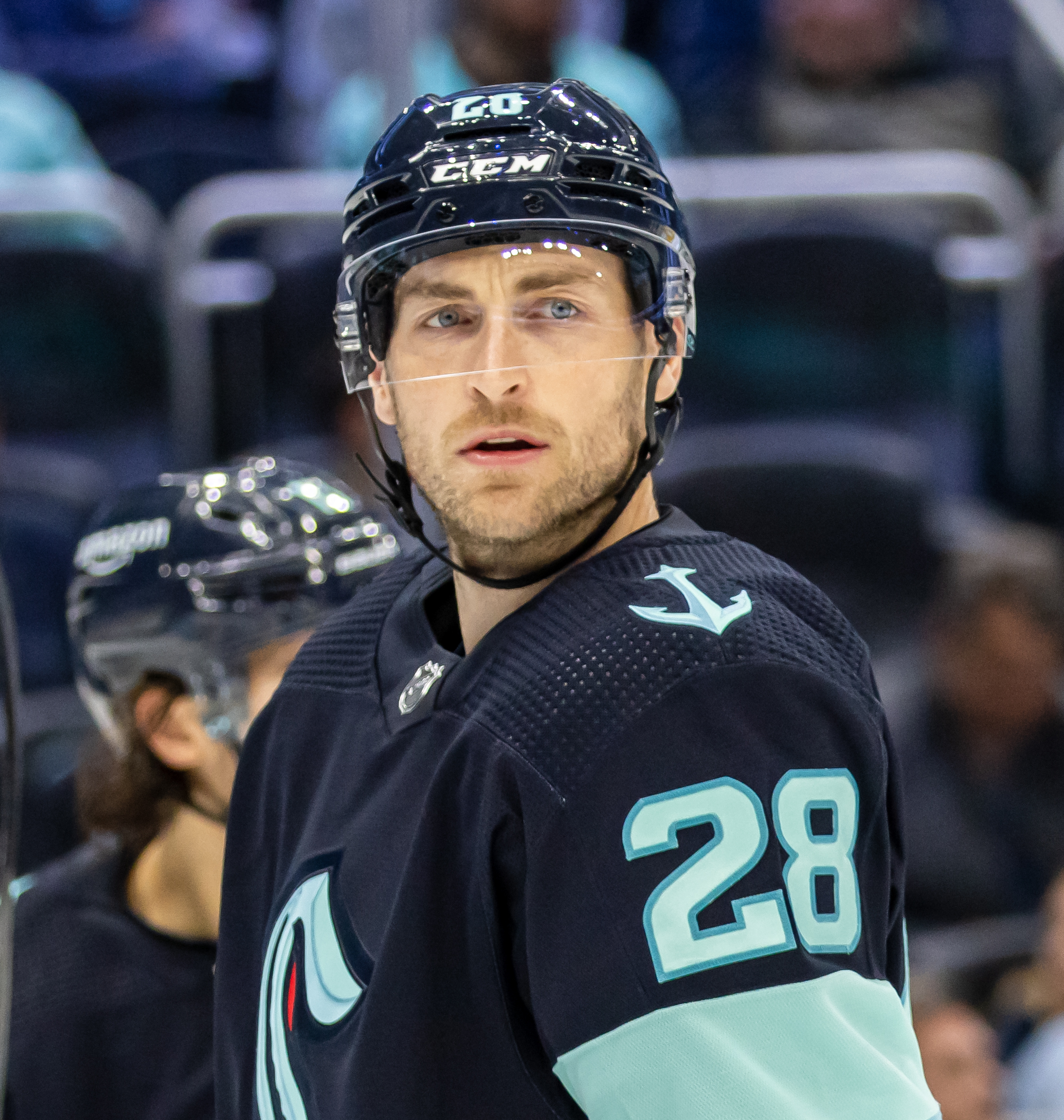
Carson Soucy

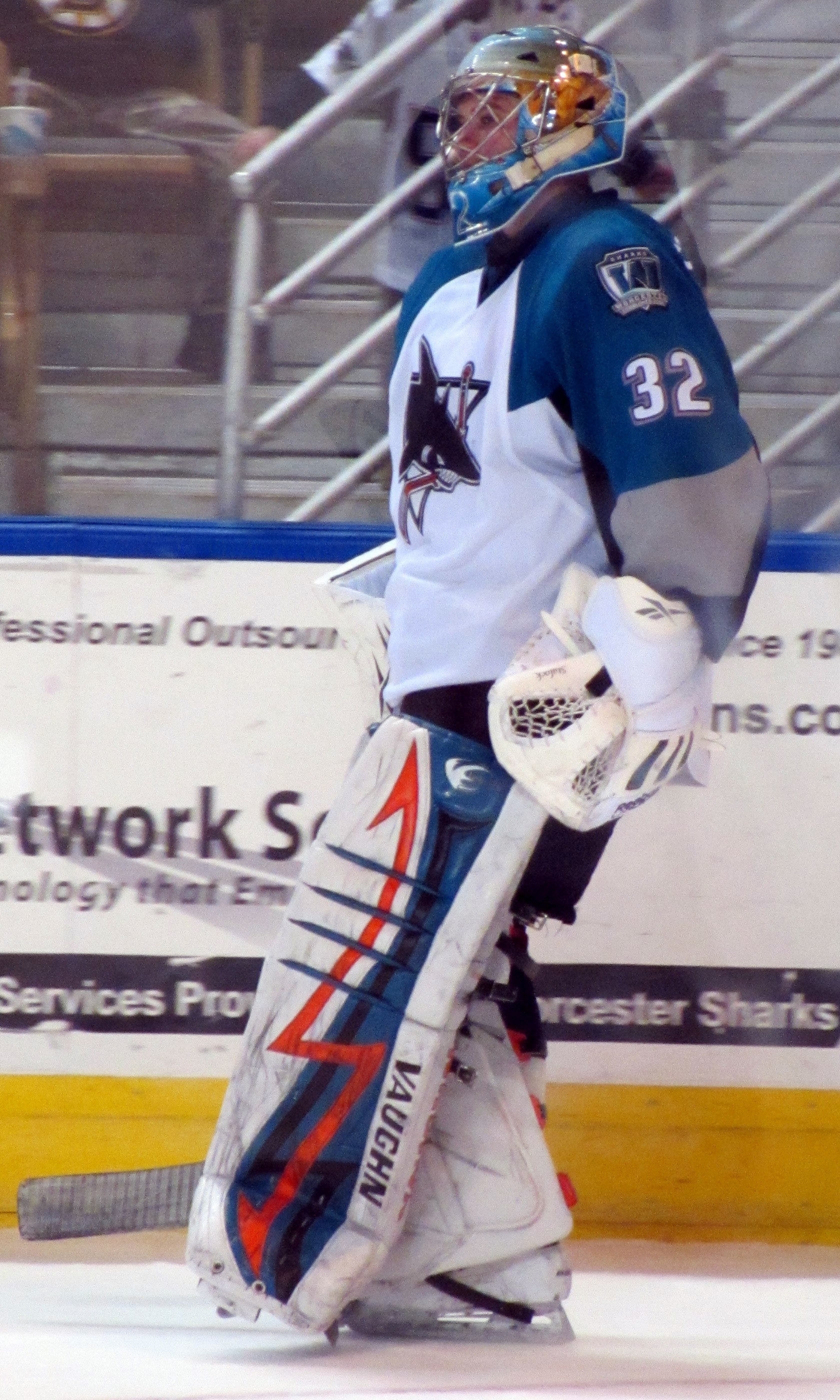
Alex Stalock

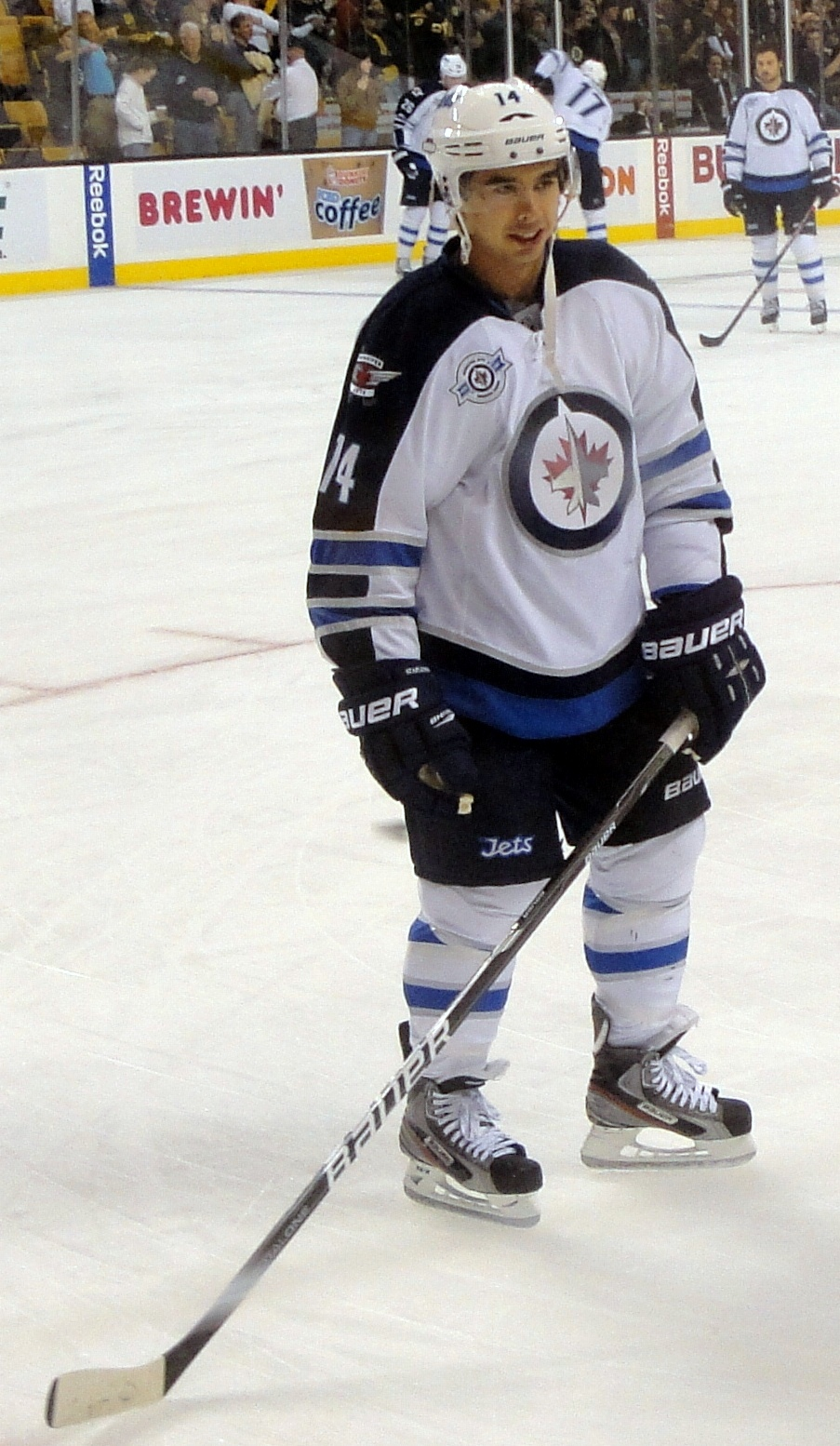
Tim Stapleton

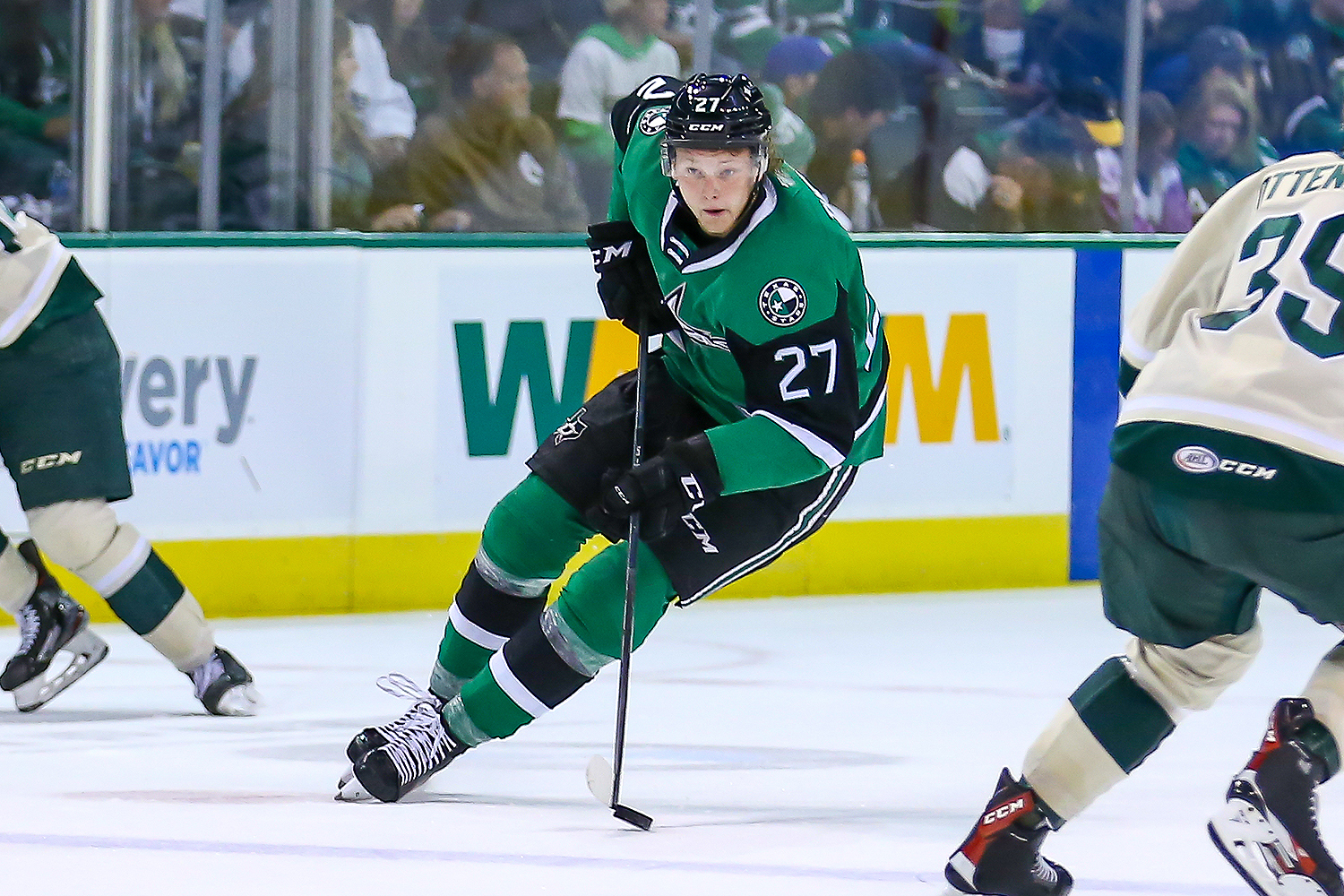
Riley Tufte

=== WHA ===
Several players also were members of WHA teams.

Player	Position	Team(s)	Years	Avco Cups
Ron Busniuk	Center	MFS, NEW, EDM	1974–1978	0
Keith Christiansen	Center	MFS	1972–1974	0
Murray Keogan	Forward	PHX, CAC	1974–1978	0
Dave Langevin	Defenseman	EDM	1976–1979	0
Thomas Milani	Right wing	MFS	1976–1977	0
Mike Stevens	Defenseman	PHX, HOU	1972–1975	0

== See also ==
- Minnesota Duluth Bulldogs women's ice hockey
