= Jon Rohloff =

American ice hockey player (born 1969)

- Born: October 3, 1969 (age 56) Mankato, Minnesota, U.S.
- Height: 5 ft 11 in (180 cm)
- Weight: 200 lb (91 kg; 14 st 4 lb)
- Position: Defense
- Shot: Right
- Played for: Boston Bruins
- National team: United States
- NHL draft: 186th overall, 1988; Boston Bruins
- Playing career: 1993–2001

Jonathan Richard Rohloff (born October 3, 1969) is an American former professional ice hockey defenseman. He was drafted in the ninth round, 186th overall, by the Boston Bruins in the 1988 NHL entry draft. Rohloff was born in Mankato, Minnesota, but grew up in Grand Rapids, Minnesota.

Rohloff played 150 games in the National Hockey League with the Bruins between 1994 and 1997. He scored seven goals and twenty-five assists.

His first NHL goal occurred on February 25, 1995. It was Boston's only goal in the team's 1-1 tie with the Quebec Nordiques.

== Career statistics ==
=== Regular season and playoffs ===
| | | | Regular season | | | | | Playoffs |
| Season | Team | League | GP | G | A | Pts | PIM | GP | G | A | Pts | PIM |
|---|---|---|---|---|---|---|---|---|---|---|---|---|
| 1985–86 | St. Paul Vulcans | USHL | — | — | — | — | — | — | — | — | — | — |
| 1986–87 | Grand Rapids High School | HS-MN | 21 | 12 | 23 | 35 | 16 | — | — | — | — | — |
| 1987–88 | Grand Rapids High School | HS-MN | 28 | 10 | 13 | 23 | — | — | — | — | — | — |
| 1988–89 | University of Minnesota-Duluth | WCHA | 39 | 1 | 2 | 3 | 44 | — | — | — | — | — |
| 1989–90 | University of Minnesota-Duluth | WCHA | 5 | 0 | 1 | 1 | 6 | — | — | — | — | — |
| 1990–91 | University of Minnesota-Duluth | WCHA | 32 | 6 | 11 | 17 | 38 | — | — | — | — | — |
| 1991–92 | University of Minnesota-Duluth | WCHA | 27 | 9 | 9 | 18 | 48 | — | — | — | — | — |
| 1992–93 | University of Minnesota-Duluth | WCHA | 36 | 15 | 20 | 35 | 87 | — | — | — | — | — |
| 1993–94 | Providence Bruins | AHL | 55 | 12 | 23 | 35 | 59 | — | — | — | — | — |
| 1994–95 | Boston Bruins | NHL | 34 | 3 | 8 | 11 | 39 | 5 | 0 | 0 | 0 | 6 |
| 1994–95 | Providence Bruins | AHL | 4 | 2 | 1 | 3 | 6 | — | — | — | — | — |
| 1995–96 | Boston Bruins | NHL | 79 | 1 | 12 | 13 | 59 | 5 | 1 | 2 | 3 | 2 |
| 1996–97 | Boston Bruins | NHL | 37 | 3 | 5 | 8 | 31 | — | — | — | — | — |
| 1996–97 | Providence Bruins | AHL | 3 | 1 | 1 | 2 | 0 | — | — | — | — | — |
| 1997–98 | Providence Bruins | AHL | 58 | 6 | 17 | 23 | 46 | — | — | — | — | — |
| 1998–99 | Kentucky Thoroughblades | AHL | 12 | 0 | 1 | 1 | 8 | — | — | — | — | — |
| 1998–99 | Kansas City Blades | IHL | 41 | 5 | 13 | 18 | 42 | 3 | 0 | 0 | 0 | 18 |
| 1999–00 | Kansas City Blades | IHL | 44 | 5 | 18 | 23 | 38 | — | — | — | — | — |
| 2000–01 | Cincinnati Cyclones | IHL | 66 | 2 | 17 | 19 | 62 | 4 | 0 | 0 | 0 | 6 |
| NHL totals | | | 150 | 7 | 25 | 32 | 129 | 10 | 1 | 2 | 3 | 8 |

=== International ===
| Year | Team | Event | GP | G | A | Pts | PIM |
|---|---|---|---|---|---|---|---|
| 1997 | United States | WC | 8 | 0 | 2 | 2 | 10 |
| Senior totals | | | 8 | 0 | 2 | 2 | 10 |

== Awards and honors ==
| Award | Year |
|---|---|
| All-WCHA Second Team | 1992–93 |
