= Walt Ledingham =

Canadian ice hockey player

- Born: October 26, 1950 (age 76) Midale, Saskatchewan, Canada
- Height: 5 ft 11 in (180 cm)
- Weight: 180 lb (82 kg; 12 st 12 lb)
- Position: Left wing
- Shot: Left
- Played for: Chicago Black Hawks; New York Islanders
- NHL draft: 56th overall, 1970; Chicago Black Hawks
- Playing career: 1972–1977

Walter Norman Ledingham (born October 26, 1950) is a Canadian former professional ice hockey player who played 15 games in the National Hockey League with the Chicago Black Hawks and New York Islanders between 1973 and 1976. Ledingham was born in Midale, Saskatchewan, but grew up in Weyburn, Saskatchewan.

== Career statistics ==
=== Regular season and playoffs ===
			Regular season					Playoffs
Season	Team	League	GP	G	A	Pts	PIM	GP	G	A	Pts	PIM
1966–67	Weyburn Red Wings	CMJHL	3	0	0	0	2	—	—	—	—	—
1967–68	Weyburn Red Wings	WCHL	60	22	28	50	30	—	—	—	—	—
1969–70	University of Minnesota-Duluth	WCHA	27	16	11	27	4	—	—	—	—	—
1970–71	University of Minnesota-Duluth	WCHA	34	26	28	54	38	—	—	—	—	—
1971–72	University of Minnesota-Duluth	WCHA	35	24	29	53	18	—	—	—	—	—
1972–73	Chicago Black Hawks	NHL	9	0	1	1	4	—	—	—	—	—
1972–73	Dallas Black Hawks	CHL	62	22	31	53	55	7	4	3	7	4
1973–74	Dallas Black Hawks	CHL	59	13	22	35	17	10	5	6	11	4
1974–75	New York Islanders	NHL	2	0	1	1	0	—	—	—	—	—
1974–75	New Haven Nighthawks	AHL	76	30	36	66	44	16	4	10	14	4
1975–76	Fort Worth Texans	CHL	55	13	19	32	20	—	—	—	—	—
1976–77	New York Islanders	NHL	4	0	0	0	0	—	—	—	—	—
1976–77	Rhode Island Reds	AHL	73	29	57	86	20	—	—	—	—	—
AHL totals			149	59	93	152	64	16	4	10	14	4
CHL totals			176	48	72	120	92	17	9	9	18	8
NHL totals			15	0	2	2	4	—	—	—	—	—

== Awards and honors ==
Award	Year
All-WCHA First Team	1970–71
AHCA West All-American	1970–71
All-WCHA Second Team	1971–72
AHCA West All-American	1971–72
