= Justin Fontaine (ice hockey) =

Canadian ice hockey player

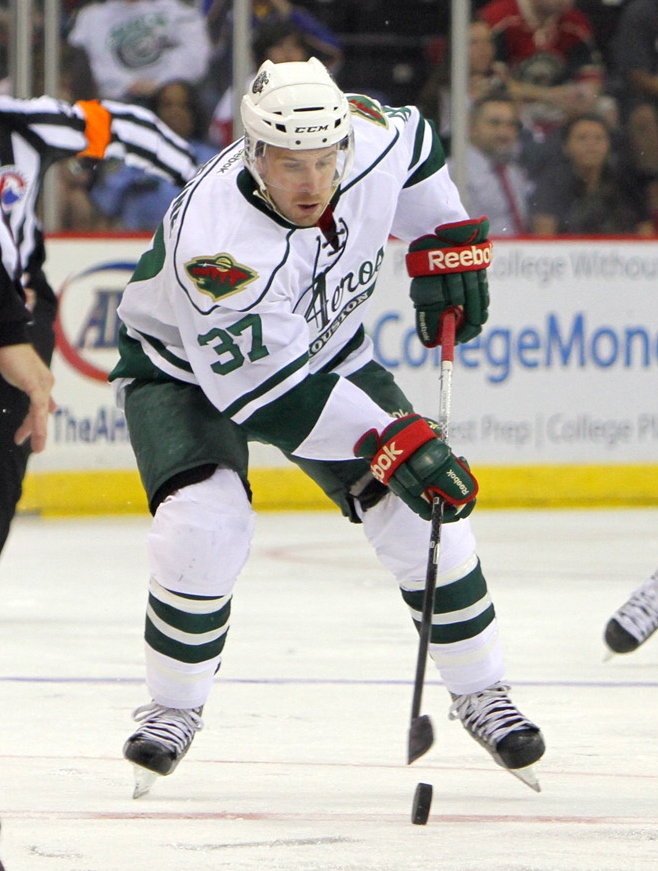
- Fontaine with the Houston Aeros in 2012
- Born: November 6, 1987 (age 38) Bonnyville, Alberta, Canada
- Height: 5 ft 10 in (178 cm)
- Weight: 177 lb (80 kg; 12 st 9 lb)
- Position: Right wing
- Shot: Right
- Played for: Minnesota Wild; HC Dinamo Minsk; Kunlun Red Star; Kölner Haie
- NHL draft: Undrafted
- Playing career: 2011–2020

Medal record

Ice hockey

Representing Canada West

World Junior A Challenge
Gold medal – first place	2006 Yorkton	

Justin Carl Fontaine (born November 6, 1987) is a Canadian former professional ice hockey player. He played in the National Hockey League (NHL) for the Minnesota Wild.

== Playing career ==
Fontaine attended the University of Minnesota Duluth where he played four seasons (2007–2011) of NCAA college hockey with the Minnesota–Duluth Bulldogs.

On April 19, 2011, the Minnesota Wild signed Fontaine as a free agent to an entry-level contract. In the 2013–14 season, Fontaine scored his first NHL goal on October 12, 2013 against Dan Ellis of the Dallas Stars 12 seconds into the first period – a Minnesota Wild record.

In his rookie season, Fontaine notched 13 goals, a good secondary scoring player for the Wild, although his 13 goals were impressive, Fontaine was sometimes a healthy scratch in favor of veteran players, when he did play however, he was mostly used as third or fourth liner. Fontaine finished his rookie season with 13 goals and 8 assists for 21 points. On July 29, 2014, Fontaine was re-signed to a 2-year contract. Fontaine played 9 playoff games, adding a goal and an assist against Colorado and Chicago.

Fontaine's playing time increased in his sophomore season, as he was constantly juggled from line to line. His role changes however, did not affect his play, as he was able to adapt rather quickly to playing on different lines and with different players. He was sometimes used as first or second liner when injuries came upon the Wild, and was credited for not changing his game when he was shuffled around. Fontaine showed signs of his old scoring self, but showed some of his playmaking skills as well. Fontaine's goals decreased to just 9, but he did however, notch 22 assists.

After ending his 5-year association with the Minnesota Wild, as a free agent off-season, Fontaine was unable to attain an NHL contract. On September 8, 2016, he agreed to attend the Florida Panthers training camp on a professional try-out contract.

On October 16, 2016, Fontaine signed a 1-year, 2-way deal with the New York Rangers and was immediately assigned to their American Hockey League (AHL) affiliate, the Hartford Wolf Pack. However, after collecting 30 points in 50 games with the Wolf Pack on March 1, 2017, Fontaine was traded by the Rangers to the Edmonton Oilers in exchange for Taylor Beck.

As a free agent from the Oilers following the completion of his contract, Fontaine opted to pursue a career abroad in agreeing to a one-year deal with HC Dinamo Minsk of the KHL on July 31, 2017.

== Post-career ==
When Fontaine finished his hockey career officially in 2020, he began teaching skills training in his hometown Bonnyville, Alberta. On January 21st, 2023 the Bonnyville Pontiacs retired Fontaine's jersey #14 and sent his banner into the rafters.

== Career statistics ==
			Regular season					Playoffs
Season	Team	League	GP	G	A	Pts	PIM	GP	G	A	Pts	PIM
2004–05	Bonnyville Pontiacs	AJHL	12	1	4	5	12	—	—	—	—	—
2005–06	Bonnyville Pontiacs	AJHL	50	26	55	81	36	9	1	6	7	4
2006–07	Bonnyville Pontiacs	AJHL	52	30	41	71	60	5	3	5	8	10
2007–08	U. of Minnesota-Duluth	WCHA	35	4	8	12	8	—	—	—	—	—
2008–09	U. of Minnesota-Duluth	WCHA	43	15	33	48	18	—	—	—	—	—
2009–10	U. of Minnesota-Duluth	WCHA	39	21	25	46	22	—	—	—	—	—
2010–11	U. of Minnesota-Duluth	WCHA	42	22	36	58	42	—	—	—	—	—
2011–12	Houston Aeros	AHL	73	16	39	55	32	4	0	0	0	0
2012–13	Houston Aeros	AHL	64	23	33	56	18	5	3	5	8	4
2013–14	Minnesota Wild	NHL	66	13	8	21	26	9	1	1	2	2
2014–15	Minnesota Wild	NHL	71	9	22	31	12	6	1	1	2	2
2015–16	Minnesota Wild	NHL	60	5	11	16	20	4	0	0	0	0
2016–17	Hartford Wolf Pack	AHL	50	9	21	30	20	—	—	—	—	—
2016–17	Bakersfield Condors	AHL	15	2	9	11	6	—	—	—	—	—
2017–18	Dinamo Minsk	KHL	52	13	17	30	33	—	—	—	—	—
2018–19	Kunlun Red Star	KHL	54	8	14	22	16	—	—	—	—	—
2019–20	Kölner Haie	DEL	8	1	4	5	8	—	—	—	—	—
NHL totals			197	27	41	68	58	19	2	2	4	4

== Awards and honours ==
Award	Year
College
All-WCHA Second team	2008–09
All-WCHA Second team	2009–10
All-WCHA Second team	2010–11
