= Guy Gosselin =

American ice hockey player and ice sled hockey coach

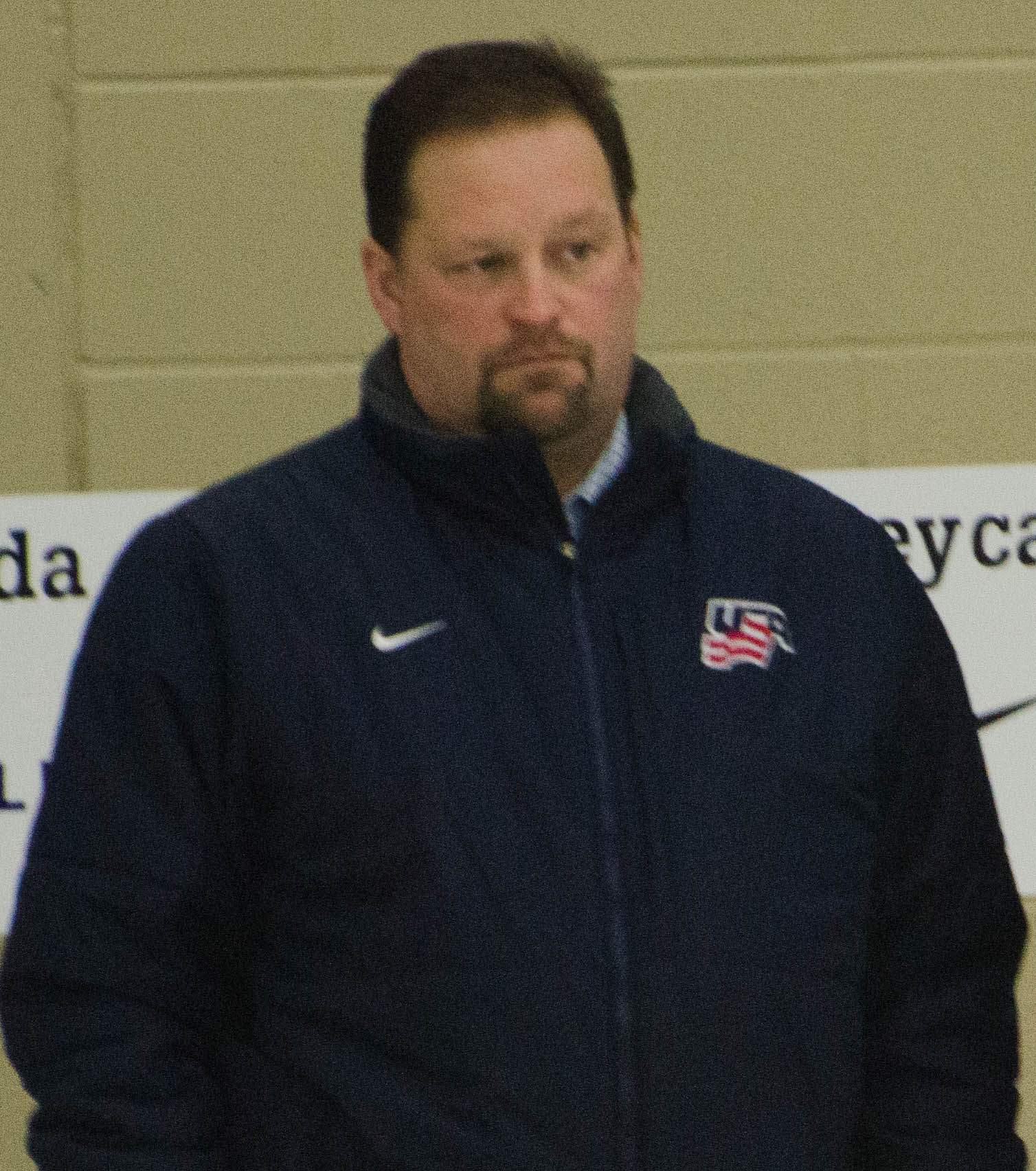
- Gosselin in 2015
- Born: January 6, 1964 (age 62) Rochester, Minnesota, USA
- Height: 5 ft 11 in (180 cm)
- Weight: 194 lb (88 kg; 13 st 12 lb)
- Position: Defense
- Shot: Left
- Played for: Winnipeg Jets
- National team: United States
- NHL draft: 159th overall, 1982; Winnipeg Jets
- Playing career: 1988–1994

Guy Gordon Gosselin (born January 6, 1964) is an American professional ice sled hockey coach and former ice hockey defenseman. He was drafted in the eighth round, 159th overall, by the Winnipeg Jets in the 1982 NHL entry draft.

Gosselin played five games in the National Hockey League with the Jets in the 1987–88 season in Jersey #5. He was scoreless with six penalty minutes.

Since 2017, Gosselin has been the head coach of the United States men's national ice sledge hockey team. He coached the American team that went on to win a gold medal in para ice hockey at the 2018 Winter Paralympics in PyeongChang, South Korea.

== Career statistics ==
=== Regular season and playoffs ===
			Regular season					Playoffs
Season	Team	League	GP	G	A	Pts	PIM	GP	G	A	Pts	PIM
1980–81	John Marshall High School	HS-MN	—	—	—	—	—	—	—	—	—	—
1981–82	John Marshall High School	HS-MN	22	14	15	29	48	—	—	—	—	—
1982–83	University of Minnesota Duluth	WCHA	4	0	0	0	0	—	—	—	—	—
1983–84	University of Minnesota Duluth	WCHA	37	3	3	6	26	—	—	—	—	—
1984–85	University of Minnesota Duluth	WCHA	47	3	7	10	25	—	—	—	—	—
1985–86	University of Minnesota Duluth	WCHA	39	2	16	18	53	—	—	—	—	—
1986–87	University of Minnesota Duluth	WCHA	33	7	8	15	66	—	—	—	—	—
1987–88	United States National Team	Intl	50	3	19	22	82	—	—	—	—	—
1987–88	Winnipeg Jets	NHL	5	0	0	0	6	—	—	—	—	—
1988–89	Moncton Hawks	AHL	58	2	8	10	56	—	—	—	—	—
1989–90	Moncton Hawks	AHL	70	2	10	12	37	10	1	1	2	10
1990–91	Skellefteå AIK	SWE-2	34	3	4	7	24	—	—	—	—	—
1991–92	United States National Team	Intl	18	1	3	4	20	—	—	—	—	—
1992–93	Skellefteå AIK	SWE-2	29	4	7	11	20	—	—	—	—	—
1993–94	Kansas City Blades	IHL	19	1	6	7	2	—	—	—	—	—
AHL totals			128	4	18	22	93	10	1	1	2	2
NHL totals			5	0	0	0	6	—	—	—	—	—

=== International ===
Year	Team	Event	GP	G	A	Pts	PIM
1986	United States	WC	8	0	0	0	10
1988	United States	OLY	6	0	3	3	2
1990	United States	WC	10	3	0	3	4
1991	United States	WC	10	0	1	1	6
1992	United States	OLY	8	0	0	0	6
Senior totals			42	3	4	7	28

== Awards and honors ==
Award	Year
All-WCHA Second Team	1986–87
