= 2011 WCHA men's ice hockey tournament =

2011 WCHA Men's ice hockey tournament
- Dates: March 11–19, 2011
- Teams: 12
- Finals site: Xcel Energy Center; St. Paul, Minnesota
- Champions: North Dakota (16th title)
- Winning coach: Dave Hakstol (4th title)
- WCHA Men's Ice Hockey Tournaments

The 2011 WCHA Men's Ice Hockey Tournament was the 52nd conference playoff in league history and 57th season where a WCHA champion was crowned. The 2011 tournament was played between March 11 and March 19, 2011, at five conference arenas and the Xcel Energy Center in St. Paul, Minnesota. By winning the tournament, North Dakota received the Broadmoor Trophy and was awarded the Western Collegiate Hockey Association's automatic bid to the 2011 NCAA Division I Men's Ice Hockey Tournament.

== Format ==
The first round of the postseason tournament features a best-of-three games format. All twelve conference teams participate in the tournament. Teams are seeded No. 1 through No. 12 according to their final conference standing, with a tiebreaker system used to seed teams with an identical number of points accumulated. The top six seeded teams each earn home ice and host one of the lower seeded teams.

The winners of the first round series advance to the Xcel Energy Center for the WCHA Final Five, the collective name for the quarterfinal, semifinal, and championship rounds. The Final Five uses a single-elimination format. Teams are re-seeded No. 1 through No. 6 according to the final regular season conference standings, with the top two teams automatically advancing to the semifinals.

=== Conference standings ===
Note: GP = Games played; W = Wins; L = Losses; T = Ties; PTS = Points; GF = Goals For; GA = Goals Against

2010–11 Western Collegiate Hockey Association standings
	Conference							Overall					
	GP	W	L	T	PTS	GF	GA	GP	W	L	T	GF	GA
#2 North Dakota†*	28	21	6	1	43	112	62	44	32	9	3	178	94
#7 Denver	28	17	8	3	37	93	75	42	25	12	5	136	113
#14 Nebraska–Omaha	28	17	9	2	36	94	69	39	21	16	2	128	99
#1 Minnesota–Duluth	28	15	8	5	35	91	73	42	26	10	6	143	108
Minnesota	28	13	10	5	31	91	78	36	16	14	6	113	102
#11 Colorado College	28	13	13	2	28	83	84	45	23	19	3	143	131
Wisconsin	28	12	13	3	27	75	72	41	21	16	4	129	98
Alaska–Anchorage	28	12	14	2	26	62	78	37	16	18	3	89	106
St. Cloud State	28	11	13	4	26	84	80	38	15	18	5	112	113
Bemidji State	28	8	15	5	21	62	78	38	15	18	5	89	102
Minnesota State	28	8	16	4	20	67	90	38	14	18	6	105	116
Michigan Tech	28	2	24	2	6	49	124	38	4	30	4	75	169
Championship: North Dakota † indicates conference regular season champion * indicates conference tournament champion Current rankings: USCHO.com/CBS College Sports Top 20 Poll

== Bracket ==
Teams are reseeded after the first round

First round March 11–13
1	North Dakota	8	3	—
12	Michigan Tech	0	1	—
2	Denver	4	3*	—
11	Minnesota State	2	2	—
3	Nebraska-Omaha	2	2	—
10	Bemidji State	4	3	—
4	Minnesota-Duluth	4	3***	—
9	St. Cloud State	2	2	—
5	Minnesota	3	0	—
8	Alaska-Anchorage	4	2	—
6	Colorado College	1	4*	2
7	Wisconsin	3	3	1

Quarterfinals; March 17
4	Minnesota-Duluth	2
10	Bemidji State	3*
6	Colorado College	4
8	Alaska-Anchorage	2

Semifinals; March 18
2	Denver	6
10	Bemidji State	2
1	North Dakota	4
6	Colorado College	3

Championship; March 19
1	North Dakota	3**
2	Denver	2

Note: * denotes overtime periods

=== First round ===
==== (1) North Dakota vs. (12) Michigan Tech ====
March 11	North Dakota	8 - 0	Michigan Tech	Ralph Engelstad Arena	Recap
Jason Gregoire (22) - 03:11; Brett Hextall (11) - 03:40; Matt Frattin (30) - 05:12; Matt Frattin (31) - SH - 12:39; Jason Gregoire (23) - 18:41		First period	No scoring
Jason Gregoire (24) - PP - 05:22; Matt Frattin (32) - PP - 15:17		Second period	No scoring
Jake Marto (7) - 04:23		Third period	No scoring
Aaron Dell - ( 16 saves / 16 shots )		Goalie stats	Kevin Genoe - ( 9 saves / 14 shots ) Josh Robinson - ( 25 saves / 28 shots )

March 12	North Dakota	3 - 1	Michigan Tech	Ralph Engelstad Arena	Recap
No scoring		First period	06:15 - Ryan Furne (12)
Brett Hextall (12) - 03:33; Taylor Dickin (1) - 05:34		Second period	No scoring
Matt Frattin (33) - EN - 19:54		Third period	No scoring
Aaron Dell - ( 18 saves / 19 shots )		Goalie stats	Josh Robinson - ( 35 saves / 37 shots )

North Dakota Wins Series 2–0

==== (2) Denver vs. (11) Minnesota State ====
March 11	Denver	4 - 2	Minnesota State	Magness Arena	Recap
No scoring		First period	10:49 - Zach Lehrke (2); 19:58 - Kurt Davis (9) - PP
No scoring		Second period	No scoring
Kyle Ostrow (12) - PP - 04:20; Beau Bennett (9) - 08:00; Shawn Ostrow (1) - 17:35; Shawn Ostrow (2) - EN - 19:58		Third period	No scoring
Sam Brittain - ( 22 saves / 24 shots )		Goalie stats	Phil Cook - ( 23 saves / 26 shots )

March 12	Denver	3 - 2	OT	Minnesota State	Magness Arena	Recap
No scoring		First period		No scoring
No scoring		Second period		00:46 - Ben Youds (2) - PP
Matt Donovan (8) - PP - 09:35; David Makowski (6) - PP - 13:45		Third period		11:56 - J.P. Burkemper (3)
Jason Zucker (21) - 01:29		First overtime period		No scoring
Sam Brittain - ( 32 saves / 34 shots )		Goalie stats		Austin Lee - ( 31 saves / 34 shots )

Denver Wins Series 2–0

==== (3) Nebraska-Omaha vs. (10) Bemidji State ====
March 11	Nebraska-Omaha	2 - 4	Bemidji State	Qwest Center Omaha	Recap
No scoring		First period	No scoring
Ryan Walters (10) - PP - 14:02		Second period	04:53 - Jordan George (16); 10:50 - Ian Lowe (12)
Terry Broadhurst (11) - PP - 06:44		Third period	18:07 - Jamie MacQueen (6); 18:28 - Matt Read (19)
John Faulkner - ( 13 saves / 17 shots )		Goalie stats	Dan Bakala - ( 46 saves / 48 shots )

March 12	Nebraska-Omaha	2 - 3	Bemidji State	Qwest Center Omaha	Recap
Rich Purslow (12) - 09:32		First period	11:34 - Matt Read (20) - PP
No scoring		Second period	08:15 - Jamie MacQueen (7)
Ryan Walters (11) - EA - 19:52		Third period	08:48 - Matt Read (21)
John Faulkner - ( 17 saves / 20 shots )		Goalie stats	Dan Bakala - ( 40 saves / 43 shots )

Bemidji State Wins Series 2-0

==== (4) Minnesota-Duluth vs. (9) St. Cloud State ====
March 11	Minnesota-Duluth	4 - 2	St. Cloud State	Amsoil Arena	Recap
J.T. Brown (15) (Schmidt, Hendrickson) - 01:42		First period	03:30 - David Eddy (8) (Johnson, Gravel)
Justin Faulk (8) (Fontaine, Montgomery) - 07:15; Mike Connolly (24) (Fontaine, J. Connolly) - 15:01		Second period	No scoring
Kyle Schmidt (8) (Olesksuk, Bergman) - EN - 19:11		Third period	15:53 - Jared Festler (12) (Jensen, Dowd) - EA
Kenny Reiter ( 18 saves / 20 shots )		Goalie stats	Mike Lee ( 22 saves / 25 shots )

March 12	Minnesota-Duluth	3 - 2	3OT	St. Cloud State	Amsoil Arena	Recap
Jack Connolly (14) (Fontaine, M. Connolly) - PP - 07:34; Jack Connolly (15) (Fontaine, Faulk) - 13:01		First period		No scoring
No scoring		Second period		03:06 - David Eddy (9) (Reid, Roe) - PP
No scoring		Third period		09:20 - Taylor Johnson (3) (Marvin)
Mike Connolly (25) (Hendrickson, Fontaine) - 01:13		Third overtime period		No scoring
Kenny Reiter ( 37 saves / 39 shots )		Goalie stats		Mike Lee ( 60 saves / 63 shots )

Minnesota-Duluth Wins Series 2-0

Note: Game 2 was the 3rd longest game in WCHA History and 12th longest in NCAA history, although not the longest match between these two schools. SCSU defeated UMD in Triple Overtime in Game 3 of their WCHA 1st Round series in 2007, that went 11:13 into triple overtime. This is the 1st time 2 schools have played 2 triple-overtime games vs one another.

==== (5) Minnesota vs. (8) Alaska-Anchorage ====
March 11	Minnesota	3 - 4	Alaska-Anchorage	Mariucci Arena	Recap
No scoring		First period	19:23 - Sean Wiles (10)
Jake Hansen (11) - PS - 12:12; Aaron Ness (2) - PP - 13:01		Second period	01:56 - Jade Portwood (2); 09:19 - Alex Gellert (2) - SH
Kevin Wehrs (3) - 11:18		Third period	13:28 - Mitch Bruijsten (9) - PP
Kent Patterson ( 32 saves / 36 shots )		Goalie stats	Chris Kamal ( 20 saves / 23 shots )

March 12	Minnesota	0 - 2	Alaska-Anchorage	Mariucci Arena	Recap
No scoring		First period	No scoring
No scoring		Second period	No scoring
No scoring		Third period	02:32 - Mickey Spencer (1); 13:24 - Tommy Grant (16)
Kent Patterson ( 23 saves / 25 shots )		Goalie stats	Chris Kamal ( 24 saves / 24 shots )

Alaska-Anchorage Wins Series 2-0

==== (6) Colorado College vs. (7) Wisconsin ====
March 11	Colorado College	1 - 3	Wisconsin	World Arena	Recap
No scoring		First period	No scoring
Nick Dineen (12) - PP - 05:53		Second period	12:11 - Joe Faust (1)
No scoring		Third period	04:12 - Ryan Little (6); 19:49 - Jefferson Dahl (2) - EN
Joe Howe ( 19 saves / 22 shots )		Goalie stats	Scott Gudmandson ( 27 saves / 28 shots )

March 12	Colorado College	4 - 3	OT	Wisconsin	World Arena	Recap
No scoring		First period		11:00 - Craig Smith (18); 13:01 - Podge Turnbull (13)
Jaden Schwartz (14) - 10:49		Second period		No scoring
Gabe Guentzel (6) - 03:11; Scott Winkler (3) - 16:31		Third period		05:44 - Sean Dolan (7)
Jaden Schwartz (15) - PP - 05:48		First overtime period		No scoring
Joe Howe ( 27 saves / 30 shots )		Goalie stats		Scott Gudmandson ( 24 saves / 28 shots )

March 13	Colorado College	2 - 1	Wisconsin	World Arena	Recap
No scoring		First period	No scoring
No scoring		Second period	17:22 - Craig Smith (19) - PP
Nick Dineen (13) - PP - 09:27; Stephen Schultz (15) - PP - 13:21		Third period	No scoring
Joe Howe ( 33 saves / 34 shots )		Goalie stats	Brett Bennett ( 24 saves / 26 shots )

Colorado College Wins Series 2-1

=== Quarterfinals ===
==== (4) Minnesota-Duluth vs. (10) Bemidji State ====
March 17	Minnesota-Duluth	2 - 3	OT	Bemidji State	Xcel Energy Center	Recap
Jack Connolly (16) - 06:05; Mike Connolly (26) - SH - 16:38		First period		13:37 - Brad Hunt (3)
No scoring		Second period		No scoring
No scoring		Third period		00:28 - Matt Read (22)
No scoring		First overtime period		06:12 - Shea Walters (1) - PP
Kenny Reiter ( 18 saves / 21 shots )		Goalie stats		Dan Bakala ( 20 saves / 22 shots )

==== (6) Colorado College vs. (8) Alaska-Anchorage ====
March 17	Colorado College	4 - 2	Alaska-Anchorage	Xcel Energy Center	Recap
William Rapuzzi (10) - PP - 07:30; Tim Hall (5) - 16:30		First period	No scoring
Joe Marciano (2) - 04:39; Joe Marciano (3) - 19:42		Second period	14:57 - Mickey Spencer (2)
No scoring		Third period	18:59 - Luka Vidmar (2) - SH
Joe Howe ( 21 saves / 23 shots )		Goalie stats	Chris Kamal ( 4 saves / 7 shots ) Rob Gunderson ( 8 saves / 9 shots )

=== Semifinals ===
==== (2) Denver vs. (10) Bemidji State ====
March 18	Denver	6 - 2	Bemidji State	Xcel Energy Center	Recap
Kyle Ostrow (13) - PP - 06:15		First period	09:31 - Jordan George (17) - PP; 15:55 - Radoslav Illo (4)
Drew Shore (23) - PP - 04:15		Second period	No scoring
Nick Shore (7) - 02:56; Jarrod Mermis (4) - 08:17; Luke Salazar (17) - 15:46; Kyle Ostrow (14) - EN - 18:44		Third period	No scoring
Sam Brittain ( 36 saves / 38 shots )		Goalie stats	Dan Bakala ( 26 saves / 31 shots )

==== (1) North Dakota vs. (6) Colorado College ====
March 18	North Dakota	4 - 3	Colorado College	Xcel Energy Center	Recap
Danny Kristo (6) - 02:44		First period	17:24 - Stephen Schultz (16) - PP
Brent Davidson (4) - 14:55		Second period	05:14 - Rylan Schwartz (7)
Brad Malone (13) - SH - 08:30; Matt Frattin (34) - 14:20		Third period	11:10 - Rylan Schwartz (8) - PP
Aaron Dell ( 18 saves / 21 shots )		Goalie stats	Joe Howe ( 34 saves / 38 shots )

=== Championship ===
==== (1) North Dakota vs. (2) Denver ====
March 19	North Dakota	3 - 2	2OT	Denver	Xcel Energy Center	Recap
No scoring		First period		05:06 - Dustin Jackson (5)
Danny Kristo (7) - 02:32; Brent Davidson (5) - 08:18		Second period		No scoring
No scoring		Third period		17:47 - Anthony Maiani (8)
Matt Frattin (35) - 05:11		Second overtime period		No scoring
Aaron Dell ( 40 saves / 42 shots )		Goalie stats		Sam Brittain ( 33 saves / 36 shots )

== Tournament awards ==
=== All-Tournament Team ===
- F Matt Frattin* (North Dakota)
- F Anthony Maiani (Denver)
- F Jaden Schwartz (Colorado College)
- D Matt Donovan (Denver)
- D Chay Genoway (North Dakota)
- G Sam Brittain (Denver)

* Most Valuable Player(s)
