= Minnesota–Duluth Bulldogs men's ice hockey statistical leaders =

The following lists give individual statistical leaders of the Minnesota-Duluth Bulldogs men's ice hockey program in various categories, including goals, assists, points, and saves. Within those areas, the lists identify single-game, single-season, and career leaders. The Bulldogs represent University of Minnesota Duluth in the NCAA's National Collegiate Hockey Conference.

Minnesota-Duluth began competing in intercollegiate ice hockey in 1930. These lists are updated through the end of the 2020–21 season.

== Goals ==
Career
Rk	Player	Goals	Seasons
1	Tom Milani	100	1972–73 1973–74 1974–75 1975–76
2	Gregg Moore	99	1979–80 1980–81 1981–82 1982–83
3	Derek Plante	96	1989–90 1990–91 1991–92 1992–93
4	Bill Oleksuk	90	1978–79 1979–80 1980–81 1981–82
5	Bill Watson	89	1982–83 1983–84 1984–85
6	Scott Carlston	87	1978–79 1979–80 1980–81 1981–82
7	Brett Hull	84	1984–85 1985–86
8	Mike Peluso	80	1994–95 1995–96 1996–97 1997–98
9	Dan Lempe	79	1976–77 1977–78 1978–79 1979–80
10	Chris Marinucci	77	1990–91 1991–92 1992–93 1993–94

Season
Rk	Player	Goals	Season
1	Brett Hull	52	1985–86
2	Bill Watson	49	1984–85
3	Derek Plante	36	1992–93
4	Bill Watson	35	1983–84
	Chris Marinucci	35	1992–93
6	Gregg Moore	33	1982–83
7	Junior Lessard	32	2003–04
	Brett Hull	32	1984–85
	Bob Lakso	32	1983–84
10	Gregg Moore	31	1981–82
	Mark Pavelich	31	1978–79

Single Game
Rk	Player	Goals	Season	Opponent
1	Mike Connolly	5	2010–11	Minnesota
	Pokey Trachsel	5	1972–73	Lake Superior State

== Assists ==
Career
Rk	Player	Assists	Seasons
1	Norm Maciver	152	1982–83 1983–84 1984–85 1985–86
2	Tom Kurvers	149	1980–81 1981–82 1982–83 1983–84
3	Dan Lempe	143	1976–77 1977–78 1978–79 1979–80
	Matt Christensen	143	1982–83 1983–84 1984–85 1985–86
5	Curt Giles	135	1975–76 1976–77 1977–78 1978–79
6	Jack Connolly	131	2008–09 2009–10 2010–11 2011–12
7	Derek Plante	123	1989–90 1990–91 1991–92 1992–93
8	Keith Christiansen	121	1963–64 1964–65 1965–66 1966–67
	Bill Watson	121	1982–83 1983–84 1984–85
10	Scott Carlston	116	1978–79 1979–80 1980–81 1981–82

Season
Rk	Player	Assists	Season
1	Bill Watson	60	1984–85
2	Tom Kurvers	58	1983–84
3	Derek Plante	56	1992–93
4	Bill Watson	51	1983–84
	Norm Maciver	51	1985–86
6	Mark Pavelich	48	1978–79
7	Matt Christensen	47	1984–85
	Norm Maciver	47	1984–85
9	Brett Hauer	46	1992–93
10	Curt Giles	45	1978–79
	Pat Boutette	45	1972–73

Single Game
Rk	Player	Assists	Season	Opponent
1	Curt Giles	6	1977–78	Colorado College
	Keith Christiansen	6	1966–67	Minnesota

== Points ==
Career
Rk	Player	Points	Seasons
1	Dan Lempe	222	1976–77 1977–78 1978–79 1979–80
2	Derek Plante	219	1989–90 1990–91 1991–92 1992–93
	Matt Christensen	219	1982–83 1983–84 1984–85 1985–86
4	Bill Watson	210	1982–83 1983–84 1984–85
5	Gregg Moore	206	1979–80 1980–81 1981–82 1982–83
6	Scott Carlston	203	1978–79 1979–80 1980–81 1981–82
7	Tom Milani	198	1972–73 1973–74 1974–75 1975–76
8	Jack Connolly	197	2008–09 2009–10 2010–11 2011–12
9	Keith Christiansen	196	1963–64 1964–65 1965–66 1966–67
10	Tom Kurvers	192	1980–81 1981–82 1982–83 1983–84

Season
Rk	Player	Points	Season
1	Bill Watson	109	1984–85
2	Derek Plante	92	1992–93
3	Bill Watson	86	1983–84
4	Brett Hull	84	1985–86
5	Mark Pavelich	79	1978–79
6	Matt Christensen	77	1984–85
	Chris Marinucci	77	1992–93
8	Tom Kurvers	76	1983–84
9	Scott Carlston	74	1981–82
10	John Harrington	72	1978–79
	Gregg Moore	72	1982–83

Single Game
Rk	Player	Points	Season	Opponent
1	Curt Giles	6	1977–78	Colorado College
	Curt Giles	6	1977–78	Michigan State
	Keith Christiansen	6	1966–67	Minnesota

== Saves ==
Career
Rk	Player	Saves	Seasons
1	Rick Heinz	3,899	1974–75 1975–76 1976–77 1977–78
2	Brant Nicklin	3,880	1996–97 1997–98 1998–99 1999–00
3	Taras Lendzyk	3,491	1992–93 1993–94 1994–95 1995–96
4	Isaac Reichmuth	3,107	2002–03 2003–04 2004–05 2005–06
5	Jerome Mrazek	2,975	1970–71 1971–72 1972–73 1973–74
6	John Hyduke	2,901	1985–86 1986–87 1987–88 1988–89
7	Chad Erickson	2,760	1988–89 1989–90 1990–91
8	Hunter Shepard	2,708	2016–17 2017–18 2018–19 2019–20
9	Bill Perkl	2,646	1977–78 1978–79 1979–80 1980–81
10	Alex Stalock	2,553	2006–07 2007–08 2008–09

Season
Rk	Player	Saves	Season
1	Bob Mason	1,279	1982–83
2	Rick Heinz	1,259	1975–76
3	Chad Erickson	1,198	1989–90
4	Rick Kosti	1,183	1984–85
5	Chad Erickson	1,165	1990–91
6	Rick Heinz	1,161	1977–78
7	Bill Perkl	1,119	1978–79
8	Brant Nicklin	1,096	1997–98
9	Alex Stalock	1,094	2008–09
10	Taras Lendzyk	1,058	1994–95

Single Game
Rk	Player	Saves	Season	Opponent
1	Bill Halbrehder	77	1964–65	Michigan
