= 2010–11 Wisconsin Badgers men's ice hockey season =

American college ice hockey season

- Conference: 7th WCHA
- Home ice: Kohl Center

Rankings
- USA Today/USA Hockey Magazine: —
- USCHO.com/CBS College Sports: #19

Record
- Overall: 21-16-4
- Home: 14-6-2
- Road: 6-9-2
- Neutral: 1–1–0

Coaches and captains
- Head coach: Mike Eaves
- Captain: Sean Dolan
- Alternate captain(s): Jake Gardiner; Craig Smith

The 2010–11 Wisconsin Badgers men's ice hockey season is the team's 58th season and their 52nd season as a member of the Western Collegiate Hockey Association. They represent the University of Wisconsin–Madison in the 2010–11 NCAA Division I men's ice hockey season. The team is coached by Mike Eaves, and they play their home games at Kohl Center.

== Regular season ==
=== Standings ===
2010–11 Western Collegiate Hockey Association standings
	Conference							Overall					
	GP	W	L	T	PTS	GF	GA	GP	W	L	T	GF	GA
#2 North Dakota†*	28	21	6	1	43	112	62	44	32	9	3	178	94
#7 Denver	28	17	8	3	37	93	75	42	25	12	5	136	113
#14 Nebraska–Omaha	28	17	9	2	36	94	69	39	21	16	2	128	99
#1 Minnesota–Duluth	28	15	8	5	35	91	73	42	26	10	6	143	108
Minnesota	28	13	10	5	31	91	78	36	16	14	6	113	102
#11 Colorado College	28	13	13	2	28	83	84	45	23	19	3	143	131
Wisconsin	28	12	13	3	27	75	72	41	21	16	4	129	98
Alaska–Anchorage	28	12	14	2	26	62	78	37	16	18	3	89	106
St. Cloud State	28	11	13	4	26	84	80	38	15	18	5	112	113
Bemidji State	28	8	15	5	21	62	78	38	15	18	5	89	102
Minnesota State	28	8	16	4	20	67	90	38	14	18	6	105	116
Michigan Tech	28	2	24	2	6	49	124	38	4	30	4	75	169
Championship: North Dakota † indicates conference regular season champion * indicates conference tournament champion Current rankings: USCHO.com/CBS College Sports Top 20 Poll

=== Schedule and results ===
- Green background indicates win (2 points).
- Red background indicates loss (0 points).
- White background indicates tie (1 point).

2010–11 Schedule and Results
October: 5-2-1 (Home: 4–0–0; Road: 0–1–1; Neutral: 1-1-0)

#	Date	Visitor	Score	Home	OT	Decision	Attendance	WCHA	Overall	Box score
1†*	October 8	Boston University	4–3	Wisconsin		Gudmandson	4,000	0–0–0	0–1–0	
2†*	October 10	Wisconsin	6–0	Holy Cross		Bennett	2,014	0–0–0	1–1–0	
3†	October 15	Alabama–Huntsville	0-7	Wisconsin		Gudmandson	10,769	0–0–0	2–1–0	
4†	October 17	Alabama–Huntsville	2-5	Wisconsin		Bennett	11,731	0–0–0	3–1–0	
5	October 22	Wisconsin	2–4	Denver		Gudmandson	5,328	0-1-0	3–2–0	
6	October 23	Wisconsin	2–2	Denver	OT	Gudmandson	5,905	0–1–1	3–2–1	
7	October 29	Michigan Tech	2–5	Wisconsin		Gudmandson	11,295	1–1–1	4–2–1	
8	October 30	Michigan Tech	1–4	Wisconsin		Bennett	12,690	2–1–1	5–2–1	

November: 2–4–2 (Home: 1–4–1; Road: 1–0–1)

#	Date	Visitor	Score	Home	OT	Decision	Attendance	WCHA	Overall	Box score
9	November 5	Wisconsin	6–0	Minnesota		Gudmandson	9,689	3–1–1	6–2–1	
10	November 6	Wisconsin	3–3	Minnesota	OT	Bennett	9,913	3–1–2	6–2–2	
11	November 12	North Dakota	1-0	Wisconsin		Gudmandson	13,601	3-2-2	6-3-2	
12	November 13	North Dakota	4-2	Wisconsin		Gudmandson	15,325	3-3-2	6-4-2	
13	November 19	Minnesota–Duluth	6-5	Wisconsin	OT	Bennett	11,125	3-4-2	6-5-2	
14	November 20	Minnesota–Duluth	3-2	Wisconsin	OT	Bennett	13,163	3-5-2	6-6-2	
15†¤	November 26	Michigan	4-4	Wisconsin	OT	Bennett	12,820	3-5-2	6-6-3	
16†¤	November 27	Michigan State	1-4	Wisconsin		Gudmandson	14,012	3-5-2	7-6-3	

December: 5–1–0 (Home: 4–0–0; Road: 1–1–0)

#	Date	Visitor	Score	Home	OT	Decision	Attendance	WCHA	Overall	Box score
17	December 3	Wisconsin	1-2	Alaska-Anchorage		Gudmandson	2,765	3-6-2	7-7-3	
18	December 4	Wisconsin	3-1	Alaska-Anchorage		Gudmandson	3,154	4-6-2	8-7-3	
19	December 10	Bemidji State	2-3	Wisconsin		Gudmandson	11,358	5-6-2	9-7-3	
20	December 11	Bemidji State	0-2	Wisconsin		Gudmandson	12,757	6-6-2	10-7-3	
21†	December 30	Massachusetts	1-5	Wisconsin		Gudmandson	13,171	6-6-2	11-7-3	
22†	December 31	Massachusetts	2-4	Wisconsin		Gudmandson	13,341	6-6-2	12-7-3	

January: 7–1–0 (Home: 4–0–0; Road: 3–1–0)

#	Date	Visitor	Score	Home	OT	Decision	Attendance	WCHA	Overall	Box score
23†	January 7	Canisius	0-3	Wisconsin		Gudmandson	12,791	6-6-2	13-7-3	
24†	January 8	Canisius	5-6	Wisconsin	OT	Bennett	13,201	6-6-2	14-7-3	
25	January 14	Wisconsin	0-2	Minnesota–Duluth		Gudmandson	6,405	6-7-2	14-8-3	
26	January 15	Wisconsin	3-2	Minnesota–Duluth		Gudmandson	6,668	7-7-2	15-8-3	
27	January 21	Minnesota State	2-3	Wisconsin		Gudmandson	14,037	8-7-2	16-8-3	
28	January 22	Minnesota State	1-2	Wisconsin		Gudmandson	15,325	9-7-2	17-8-3	
29	January 28	Wisconsin	4-2	Michigan Tech		Gudmandson	2,211	10-7-2	18-8-3	
30	January 29	Wisconsin	4-1	Michigan Tech		Bennett	2,331	11-7-2	19-8-3	

February: 0–5–1 (Home: 0–1–1; Road: 0–4–0)

#	Date	Visitor	Score	Home	OT	Decision	Attendance	WCHA	Overall	Box score
31	February 11	Wisconsin	1-4	Nebraska–Omaha		Gudmandson	15,137	11-8-2	19-9-3	
32	February 12	Wisconsin	3-4	Nebraska–Omaha		Gudmandson	10,111	11-9-2	19-10-3	
33	February 18	Minnesota	5-2	Wisconsin		Gudmandson	14,315	11-10-2	19-11-3	
34	February 19	Minnesota	3-3	Wisconsin		Bennett	15,325	11-10-3	19-11-4	
35	February 25	Wisconsin	2-4	St. Cloud State		Bennett	5,982	11-11-3	19-12-4	
36	February 26	Wisconsin	3-7	St. Cloud State		Gudmandson	5,992	11-12-3	19-13-4	

March: 2–3–0 (Home: 1–1–0; Road: 1–2–0)

#	Date	Visitor	Score	Home	OT	Decision	Attendance	WCHA	Overall	Box score
37	March 4	Colorado College	3-2	Wisconsin		Bennett	13,493	11-13-3	19-14-4	
38	March 5	Colorado College	1-3	Wisconsin		Gudmandson	15,325	12-13-3	20-14-4	
39†‡	March 11	Wisconsin	3-1	Colorado College		Gudmandson	6,341	12-13-3	21-14-4	
40†‡	March 12	Wisconsin	3-4	Colorado College	OT	Gudmandson	6,652	12-13-3	21-15-4	
41†‡	March 13	Wisconsin	1-2	Colorado College		Bennett	5,451	12-13-3	21-16-4	

† Non-conference game * Warrior Ice Breaker Tournament ¤ College Hockey Showcase ‡ 2011 WCHA Men's Ice Hockey Tournament first-round game

== Player stats ==
=== Skaters ===
Note: GP = Games played; G = Goals; A = Assists; Pts = Points; +/- = Plus–minus; PIM = Penalty minutes

Player	GP	G	A	Pts	PIM
Tyler Barns	10	2	2	4	6
Jason Clark	5	0	0	0	2
Jefferson Dahl	8	0	1	1	2
Sean Dolan	10	3	5	8	2
Chase Drake	0	0	0	0	0
Joe Faust	6	0	0	0	4
Jake Gardiner	10	2	7	9	18
Gavin Hartzog	5	1	0	1	0
Craig Johnson	10	0	2	2	0
Patrick Johnson	10	1	5	6	14
Derek Lee	10	3	3	6	4
Ryan Little	10	3	3	6	16
Sean Little	0	0	0	0	0
Michael Mersch	10	5	2	7	2
Keegan Meuer	2	0	0	0	24
Jordy Murray	10	8	2	10	4
John Ramage	10	0	6	6	20
Justin Schultz	10	4	8	12	2
Frankie Simonelli	8	0	2	2	4
Craig Smith	10	5	8	13	24
Eric Springer	6	0	1	1	4
Mitch Thompson	0	0	0	0	0
Podge Turnbull	10	3	3	6	10
Mark Zengerle	10	3	13	16	2

=== Goaltenders ===
Note: GP = Games played; W = Wins; L = Losses; T = Ties; Win% = Winning percentage; GA = Goals against; MIN = Minutes played; GAA = Goals against average; SHO = Shutouts; SV% = Save percentage; SV = Saves; G = Goals; A = Assists; PIM = Penalty minutes

Player	GP	W	L	T	Win%	GA	MIN	GAA	SHO	SV%	SV	G	A	PIM
Brett Bennett	4	3	0	1	.875	6	245	1.4701	1	94	.940	0	2	0
Scott Gudmandson	6	3	2	1	.583	12	364	1.9804	1	157	.929	0	0	0
Mitch Thompson	0	0	0	0	.000	0	0	-	0	0	-	0	0	0

== See also ==
- 2010–11 Wisconsin Badgers women's ice hockey season
