= 2010–11 Minnesota–Duluth Bulldogs men's ice hockey season =

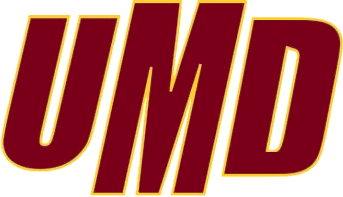

NCAA Division I champion 2011 NCAA Tournament, champion
- Conference: 4th WCHA
- Home ice: DECC Arena (end Dec. 29); AMSOIL Arena (start Dec. 30)

Rankings
- USA Today: #1
- USCHO.com: #1

Record
- Overall: 26–10–6
- Conference: 15–8–5
- Home: 12–5–2
- Road: 10–4–4
- Neutral: 4–1–0

Coaches and captains
- Head coach: Scott Sandelin
- Assistant coaches: Brett Larson; Derek Plante
- Captain: Mike Montgomery
- Alternate captain(s): Jack Connolly; Mike Connolly

The 2010–11 Minnesota–Duluth Bulldogs men's ice hockey team represented the University of Minnesota Duluth in the 2010–11 NCAA Division I men's ice hockey season. The Bulldogs were coached by Scott Sandelin, who was in his 11th year as head coach. His assistant coaches were Brett Larson and Derek Plante. The team captain was Mike Montgomery and the assistant captains were Jack Connolly and Mike Connolly. The team played their home games in AMSOIL Arena and were members of the Western Collegiate Hockey Association.

== Season ==
The Bulldogs finished the regular season with a record of 26 wins, 10 losses, and 6 ties. Seeded fourth in the WCHA Tournament, UMD defeated St. Cloud State in the first round, before being upset by tenth-seed Bemidji State in the quarterfinal. UMD received an at-large bid to the NCAA Tournament, where they were the third seed in the East Regional. The Bulldogs upset regional No. 2 seed Union and No. 1 seed Yale on the way to the Frozen Four in St. Paul, Minnesota. In the national semifinal, UMD defeated Notre Dame, 4–3, on the back of 3 power-play goals and 31 saves from goaltender Kenny Reiter. With a Kyle Schmidt goal at 3:22 in overtime, the Bulldogs defeated Michigan to win the school's first national championship. Forward J. T. Brown was named the tournament's Most Outstanding Player, while defenseman Justin Faulk and forward Kyle Schmidt were also named to the All-Tournament Team.

== Departures ==
Player	Position	Nationality	Cause
Drew Akins	Forward	United States	Graduation (signed with Gwinnett Gladiators)
Rob Bordson	Forward	United States	Signed professional contract (Anaheim Ducks)
Jordan Fulton	Forward	United States	Graduation (signed with Kalamazoo Wings)
Brady Hjelle	Forward	United States	Returned to juniors (Cedar Rapids RoughRiders); transferred to Ohio State
Dylan Olsen	Defenseman	Canada	Left mid-season (signed with Chicago Blackhawks)
Chase Ryan	Defenseman	United States	Signed professional contract (Anaheim Ducks)

== Recruiting ==
Player	Position	Nationality	Age	Notes
Joe Basaraba	Forward	Canada	18	Fort Frances, ON; selected 69th overall in 2010
J. T. Brown	Forward	United States	20	Burnsville, MN
Aaron Crandall	Goaltender	United States	20	Lakeville, MN
Justin Faulk	Defenseman	United States	18	South St. Paul, MN; selected 37th overall in 2010
Christian Gaffy	Goaltender	United States	18	Coon Rapids, MN; red shirt
Luke McManus	Defenseman	United States	20	Apple Valley, MN
Max Tardy	Forward	United States	19	Duluth, MN

== Roster ==
No.	Nat.	Player	Class	Pos	Height	Weight	DoB	Hometown	Previous team	NHL rights
2		Brady Lamb	Junior	D	6' 1" (1.85 m)	215 lb (98 kg)	1988-08-15	Calgary, Alberta	Calgary (AJHL)	—
5		Trent Palm	Senior	D	6' 1" (1.85 m)	200 lb (91 kg)	1988-06-10	Edina, Minnesota	U.S. Under-18 Team (USHL)	—
6		Scott Kishel	Junior	D	5' 11" (1.8 m)	180 lb (82 kg)	1989-04-21	Virginia, Minnesota	Sioux Falls (USHL)	MTL, 192nd overall 2007
7		Kyle Schmidt	Senior	W	5' 11" (1.8 m)	175 lb (79 kg)	1987-04-30	Hermantown, Minnesota	Fairbanks (NAHL)	—
8		Drew Olson	Sophomore	D	6' 1" (1.85 m)	200 lb (91 kg)	1990-04-04	Brainerd, Minnesota	Omaha (USHL)	CBJ, 118th overall 2008
9		Dylan Olsen	Sophomore	D	6' 3" (1.91 m)	210 lb (95 kg)	1991-01-03	Calgary Alberta	Camrose (AJHL)	CHI, 28th overall 2009
10		Dan DeLisle	Sophomore	C	6' 5" (1.96 m)	225 lb (102 kg)	1990-09-24	Arden Hills, Minnesota	Totino-Grace HS (USHS–MN)	CHI, 89th overall 2009
11		Travis Oleksuk	Junior	C	6' 1" (1.85 m)	200 lb (91 kg)	1989-02-03	Thunder Bay, Ontario	Sioux City (USHL)	—
12		Jack Connolly (A)	Junior	C	5' 8" (1.73 m)	160 lb (73 kg)	1989-08-15	Duluth, Minnesota	Sioux Falls (USHL)	—
14		Keegan Flaherty	Sophomore	W	6' 1" (1.85 m)	190 lb (86 kg)	1990-03-25	Duluth, Minnesota	Fargo-Moorhead (NAHL)	—
15		Jake Hendrickson	Sophomore	W	5' 10" (1.78 m)	175 lb (79 kg)	1989-10-02	Savage, Minnesota	Sioux City (USHL)	—
17		Mike Seidel	Sophomore	W	5' 10" (1.78 m)	180 lb (82 kg)	1988-04-04	Darien, Illinois	Cedar Rapids (USHL)	—
18		Joe Basaraba	Freshman	RW	6' 2" (1.88 m)	195 lb (88 kg)	1992-05-02	Fort Frances, Ontario	Shattuck-St. Mary's (USHS–MN)	FLA, 69th overall 2010
19		Max Tardy	Freshman	C	6' 1" (1.85 m)	185 lb (84 kg)	1990-10-27	Duluth, Minnesota	Tri-City (USHL)	STL, 202nd overall 2009
20		Cody Danberg	Senior (RS)	W	6' 1" (1.85 m)	190 lb (86 kg)	1987-03-05	Canwood, Saskatchewan	Nanaimo (BCHL)	—
21		Luke McManus	Freshman	D	6' 1" (1.85 m)	190 lb (86 kg)	1990-05-09	Apple Valley, Minnesota	Tri-City (USHL)	—
22		Mike Connolly (A)	Junior	W	5' 9" (1.75 m)	190 lb (86 kg)	1989-03-07	Calgary, Alberta	Camrose (AJHL)	—
23		J. T. Brown	Freshman	RW	5' 10" (1.78 m)	170 lb (77 kg)	1990-07-02	Burnsville, Minnesota	Waterloo (USHL)	—
24		Mike Montgomery (C)	Senior	D	6' 3" (1.91 m)	210 lb (95 kg)	1986-10-10	Lino Lakes, Minnesota	Southern Minnesota (NAHL)	—
25		Justin Faulk	Freshman	D	5' 11" (1.8 m)	200 lb (91 kg)	1992-03-20	South St. Paul, Minnesota	U.S. Under-18 Team (USHL)	CAR, 37th overall 2010
26		Chad Huttel	Senior	D	5' 10" (1.78 m)	195 lb (88 kg)	1988-12-05	Hermantown, Minnesota	Hermantown HS (USHS–MN)	—
27		David Grun	Junior	W	6' 1" (1.85 m)	200 lb (91 kg)	1987-12-17	White Bear Lake, Minnesota	Sioux Falls (USHL)	—
28		Wade Bergman	Sophomore	D	5' 8" (1.73 m)	165 lb (75 kg)	1990-09-09	Calgary, Alberta	Olds (AJHL)	—
30		Christian Gaffy	Freshman (RS)	G	6' 1" (1.85 m)	170 lb (77 kg)	1991-10-14	Scandia, Minnesota	Forest Lake HS (USHS–MN)	—
31		Aaron Crandall	Freshman	G	6' 1" (1.85 m)	190 lb (86 kg)	1990-03-25	Lakeville, Minnesota	Des Moines (USHL)	—
35		Kenny Reiter	Senior	G	5' 11" (1.8 m)	170 lb (77 kg)	1986-11-24	Pittsburgh, Pennsylvania	Fairbanks (NAHL)	—
37		Justin Fontaine	Senior	W	5' 11" (1.8 m)	175 lb (79 kg)	1987-11-06	Bonnyville, Alberta	Bonnyville (AJHL)	—

Note: a knee injury forced Cody Danberg to miss the entire season.

== Standings ==
2010–11 Western Collegiate Hockey Association standings
	Conference							Overall					
	GP	W	L	T	PTS	GF	GA	GP	W	L	T	GF	GA
#2 North Dakota†*	28	21	6	1	43	112	62	44	32	9	3	178	94
#7 Denver	28	17	8	3	37	93	75	42	25	12	5	136	113
#14 Nebraska–Omaha	28	17	9	2	36	94	69	39	21	16	2	128	99
#1 Minnesota–Duluth	28	15	8	5	35	91	73	42	26	10	6	143	108
Minnesota	28	13	10	5	31	91	78	36	16	14	6	113	102
#11 Colorado College	28	13	13	2	28	83	84	45	23	19	3	143	131
Wisconsin	28	12	13	3	27	75	72	41	21	16	4	129	98
Alaska–Anchorage	28	12	14	2	26	62	78	37	16	18	3	89	106
St. Cloud State	28	11	13	4	26	84	80	38	15	18	5	112	113
Bemidji State	28	8	15	5	21	62	78	38	15	18	5	89	102
Minnesota State	28	8	16	4	20	67	90	38	14	18	6	105	116
Michigan Tech	28	2	24	2	6	49	124	38	4	30	4	75	169
Championship: North Dakota † indicates conference regular season champion * indicates conference tournament champion Current rankings: USCHO.com/CBS College Sports Top 20 Poll

== Schedule and results ==
Date	Time	Opponent^{#}	Rank^{#}	Site	Decision	Result	Attendance	Record
Superior Showcase
October 8	6:05 pm	at Lake Superior State*	#8	Taffy Abel Arena • Sault Ste. Marie, Michigan (Superior Showcase Game 1)	Reiter	T 6–6 ^{OT}	2,069	0–0–1 (0–0–0)
October 9	6:35 pm	at Northern Michigan*	#8	Berry Events Center • Marquette, Michigan (Superior Showcase Game 2)	Reiter	W 3–2	2,849	1–0–1 (0–0–0)
Regular Season
October 15	7:05 pm	Providence*	#7	DECC Arena • Duluth, Minnesota	Reiter	W 5–3	4,523	2–0–1 (0–0–0)
October 16	7:05 pm	Providence*	#7	DECC Arena • Duluth, Minnesota	Crandall	W 7–1	4,584	3–0–1 (0–0–0)
October 22	7:05 pm	Alaska–Anchorage	#6	DECC Arena • Duluth, Minnesota	Reiter	W 3–2 ^{OT}	5,076	4–0–1 (1–0–0)
October 23	7:05 pm	Alaska–Anchorage	#6	DECC Arena • Duluth, Minnesota	Crandall	W 6–0	5,481	5–0–1 (2–0–0)
October 29	7:35 pm	at Bemidji State	#3	Sanford Center • Bemidji, Minnesota	Crandall	W 3–2 ^{OT}	3,876	6–0–1 (3–0–0)
October 30	7:05 pm	at Bemidji State	#3	Sanford Center • Bemidji, Minnesota	Reiter	T 1–1 ^{OT}	3,611	6–0–2 (3–0–1)
November 5	7:35 pm	at #9 North Dakota	#2	Ralph Engelstad Arena • Grand Forks, North Dakota	Crandall	L 2–4	11,638	6–1–2 (3–1–1)
November 6	7:05 pm	at #9 North Dakota	#2	Ralph Engelstad Arena • Grand Forks, North Dakota	Reiter	W 3–2 ^{OT}	11,731	7–1–2 (4–1–1)
November 12	7:05 pm	Michigan Tech	#2	DECC Arena • Duluth, Minnesota	Crandall	W 5–3	5,035	8–1–2 (5–1–1)
November 13	7:05 pm	Michigan Tech	#2	DECC Arena • Duluth, Minnesota	Reiter	W 4–2	5,060	9–1–2 (6–1–1)
November 19	7:05 pm	at #15 Wisconsin	#1	Kohl Center • Madison, Wisconsin	Crandall	W 6–5 ^{OT}	11,125	10–1–2 (7–1–1)
November 20	7:05 pm	at #15 Wisconsin	#1	Kohl Center • Madison, Wisconsin	Crandall	W 3–2 ^{OT}	13,163	11–1–2 (8–1–1)
December 3	7:05 pm	#10 Denver	#1	DECC Arena • Duluth, Minnesota	Reiter	L 4–5 ^{OT}	5,165	11–2–2 (8–2–1)
December 4	7:05 pm	#10 Denver	#1	DECC Arena • Duluth, Minnesota	Reiter	W 2–1	5,409	12–2–2 (9–2–1)
December 10	7:05 pm	at Minnesota	#2	Mariucci Arena • Minneapolis	Reiter	L 2–3	9,805	12–3–2 (9–3–1)
December 12	4:05 pm	at Minnesota	#2	Mariucci Arena • Minneapolis	Crandall	T 2–2 ^{OT}	9,847	12–3–3 (9–3–2)
December 30	7:35 pm	#3 North Dakota*	#4	Amsoil Arena • Duluth, Minnesota	Crandall	L 0–5	6,764	12–4–3 (9–3–2)
January 3	6:00 pm	at Clarkson*	#5	Cheel Arena • Potsdam, New York	Reiter	W 4–1	1,900	13–4–3 (9–3–2)
January 4	6:00 pm	at Clarkson*	#5	Cheel Arena • Potsdam, New York	Crandall	W 4–2	1,943	14–4–3 (9–3–2)
January 8	7:05 pm	US Under-18 Team*	#5	Amsoil Arena • Duluth, Minnesota (Exhibition)	Reiter	W 4–1	6,139	14–4–3 (9–3–2)
January 14	7:05 pm	#9 Wisconsin	#5	Amsoil Arena • Duluth, Minnesota	Reiter	W 2–0	6,405	15–4–3 (10–3–2)
January 15	7:05 pm	#9 Wisconsin	#5	Amsoil Arena • Duluth, Minnesota	Reiter	L 2–3	6,668	15–5–3 (10–4–2)
January 21	6:05 pm	at Michigan Tech	#5	MacInnes Student Ice Arena • Houghton, Michigan	Reiter	W 5–0	2,010	16–5–3 (11–4–2)
January 22	6:05 pm	at Michigan Tech	#5	MacInnes Student Ice Arena • Houghton, Michigan	Crandall	W 3–0	2,153	17–5–3 (12–4–2)
February 4	7:05 pm	Minnesota	#4	Amsoil Arena • Duluth, Minnesota	Reiter	T 2–2 ^{OT}	6,764	17–5–4 (12–4–3)
February 5	7:05 pm	Minnesota	#4	Amsoil Arena • Duluth, Minnesota	Crandall	W 6–4	6,764	18–5–4 (13–4–3)
February 11	7:05 pm	St. Cloud State	#3	Amsoil Arena • Duluth, Minnesota	Reiter	L 2–8	6,530	18–6–4 (13–5–3)
February 12	7:05 pm	St. Cloud State	#3	Amsoil Arena • Duluth, Minnesota	Reiter	T 3–3 ^{OT}	6,764	18–6–5 (13–5–4)
February 18	7:35 pm	at Minnesota State	#5	Alltel Center • Mankato, Minnesota	Reiter	L 1–3	3,875	18–7–5 (13–6–4)
February 19	7:05 pm	at Minnesota State	#5	Alltel Center • Mankato, Minnesota	Crandall	W 6–2	4,690	19–7–5 (14–6–4)
February 25	8:35 pm	at #19 Colorado College	#7	Colorado Springs World Arena • Colorado Springs, Colorado	Crandall	L 4–5	7,163	19–8–5 (14–7–4)
February 26	8:05 pm	at #19 Colorado College	#7	Colorado Springs World Arena • Colorado Springs, Colorado	Reiter	T 3–3 ^{OT}	7,262	19–8–6 (14–7–5)
March 4	7:05 pm	#12 Nebraska–Omaha	#11	Amsoil Arena • Duluth, Minnesota	Reiter	W 4–1	6,497	20–8–6 (15–7–5)
March 5	7:05 pm	#12 Nebraska–Omaha	#11	Amsoil Arena • Duluth, Minnesota	Reiter	L 2–5	6,764	20–9–6 (15–8–5)
WCHA Tournament
March 11	7:05 pm	St. Cloud State*	#11	Amsoil Arena • Duluth, Minnesota (First Round Game 1)	Reiter	W 4–2	5,070	21–9–6 (15–8–5)
March 12	7:05 pm	St. Cloud State*	#11	Amsoil Arena • Duluth, Minnesota (First Round Game 2)	Reiter	W 3–2 ^{OT}	5,076	22–9–6 (15–8–5)
March 17	3:35 pm	vs. Bemidji State*	#11	Xcel Energy Center • St. Paul, Minnesota (Quarterfinal)	Reiter	L 2–3 ^{OT}	13,131	22–10–6 (15–8–5)
NCAA Tournament
March 25	2:00 pm	vs. #8 Union*	#11	Webster Bank Arena • Bridgeport, Connecticut (East Regional Semifinal)	Reiter	W 2–0	7,671	23–10–6 (15–8–5)
March 26	5:30 pm	vs. #3 Yale*	#11	Webster Bank Arena • Bridgeport, Connecticut (East Regional Final)	Reiter	W 5–3	7,816	24–10–6 (15–8–5)
April 7	4:00 pm	vs. #9 Notre Dame*	#11	Xcel Energy Center • St. Paul, Minnesota (National Semifinal)	Reiter	W 4–3	19,139	25–10–6 (15–8–5)
April 9	6:00 pm	vs. #6 Michigan*	#11	Xcel Energy Center • St. Paul, Minnesota (National Championship)	Reiter	W 3–2 ^{OT}	19,222	26–10–6 (15–8–5)
*Non-conference game. ^{#}Rankings from USCHO.com Poll. All times are in Central Time. Source:

== National Championship game ==
April 9, 2011; 6:00 pm CDT	(W2) Michigan	2–3 (OT)	(E3) Minnesota–Duluth	Xcel Energy Center, Saint Paul, Minnesota; Attendance: 19,222

Game reference
Referees: Tim Benedetto; Jeff Bunyon; Linesmen: Bob Bernard; Chris Aughe

Scoring summary
Period	Team	Goal	Assist(s)	Time	Score
1st	UM	Ben Winnett (5)	Rust	14:42	1–0 UM
2nd	UMD	Travis Oleksuk (14)	Lamb and Brown	21:39	1–1
2nd	UMD	Max Tardy (1) – PP	Seidel and Lamb	29:31	2–1 UMD
2nd	UM	Jeff Rohrkemper (3)	Pateryn and DeBlois	37:46	2–2
3rd	None				
1st OT	UMD	Kyle Schmidt (11) – GW	Oleksuk and Lamb	63:22	3–2 UMD
Penalty summary
Period	Team	Player	Penalty	Time	PIM
1st	UM	Ben Winnett	Interference	5:46	2:00
1st	UMD	Jake Hendrickson	Boarding	9:22	2:00
1st	UM	Chris Brown	Charging	11:35	2:00
2nd	UM	Kevin Clare	Hitting After Whistle	24:10	2:00
2nd	UMD	Brady Lamb	Tripping	25:41	2:00
2nd	UM	Mac Bennett	Hooking	29:09	2:00
2nd	UM	Chris Brown	Obstruction-Interference	32:26	2:00
2nd	UM	Kevin Clare	Tripping	34:08	2:00
2nd	UMD	J. T. Brown	Unsportsmanlike Conduct	35:04	2:00
2nd	UM	Shawn Hunwick (Served by Louie Caporusso)	Unsportsmanlike Conduct	35:04	2:00
2nd	UMD	Jack Connolly	Slashing	35:18	2:00
3rd	UM	Mac Bennett	Holding	42:23	2:00
3rd	UMD	Brady Lamb	Hitting After Whistle	49:19	2:00
3rd	UM	Jon Merrill	Holding	49:27	2:00
3rd	UM	Kevin Lynch	Boarding	51:32	2:00

Shots by period
Team	1	2	3	OT	T
Minnesota–Duluth	12	15	9	2	38
Michigan	8	9	6	1	24

Goaltenders
Team	Name	Saves	Goals against	Time on ice
UMD	Kenny Reiter	22	2	63:22
UM	Shawn Hunwick	35	3	63:22

== Statistics ==
=== Skaters ===
Player	Pos	Yr	GP	G	A	Pts	PIM	PPG	SHG	GWG
Jack Connolly	C	Jr	42	18	41	59	34	7	1	3
Justin Fontaine	W	Sr	42	22	36	58	42	12	1	3
Mike Connolly	W	Jr	42	28	26	54	67	7	4	3
J.T. Brown	RW	Fr	42	16	21	37	50	5	0	2
Travis Oleksuk	C	Jr	42	14	19	33	33	3	1	7
Justin Faulk	D	Fr	39	8	25	33	47	6	0	2
Kyle Schmidt	W	Sr	35	11	11	22	22	3	0	2
Mike Seidel	W	So	41	8	6	14	37	2	0	3
Dylan Olsen	D	So	17	1	12	13	8	1	0	0
Wade Bergman	D	So	40	3	7	10	20	0	0	0
Brady Lamb	D	Jr	37	1	9	10	42	1	0	0
Mike Montgomery	D	Sr	41	0	10	10	6	0	0	0
David Grun	W	Jr	42	3	5	8	36	1	0	0
Keegan Flaherty	W	So	41	0	7	7	36	0	0	0
Dan DeLisle	C	So	31	4	2	6	12	0	0	0
Joe Basaraba	RW	Fr	36	3	2	5	0	1	0	1
Jake Hendrickson	W	So	38	1	4	5	8	0	0	0
Drew Olson	D	So	34	1	3	4	18	0	0	0
Max Tardy	C	Fr	26	1	2	3	14	1	0	0
Kenny Reiter	G	Sr	31	0	3	3	6	0	0	0
Trent Palm	D	Sr	28	0	2	2	55	0	0	0
Scott Kishel	D	Jr	7	0	1	1	4	0	0	0
Chad Huttel	D	Sr	11	0	1	1	6	0	0	0
Aaron Crandall	G	Fr	16	0	0	0	0	0	0	0
Team			42	143	255	398	603	50	7	26

=== Goalies ===
Player	Yr	GP	TOI	W	L	T	GA	GAA	SV	SV%	SO
Kenny Reiter	Sr	31	1744	16	7	5	67	2.30	716	0.914	3
Aaron Crandall	Fr	16	861	10	3	1	40	2.79	338	0.894	2

== Rankings ==
Poll	Week																									
Poll	Pre	1	2	3	4	5	6	7	8	9	10	11	12	13	14	15	16	17	18	19	20	21	22	23	24	25 (Final)
USCHO.com	8	7	6	3 (1)	2 (8)	2 (11)	1 (36)	1 (49)	1 (49)	2 (13)	4	-	5	5	5	5	4	3	5	7	11	11	11	11	-	1 (48)
USA Today	9	7	5	3 (1)	2 (7)	2 (5)	1 (27)	1 (34)	1 (34)	2 (9)	3	3	5	5	5	4	4	3 (1)	6	7	11	11	11	12	3	1 (34)

Note: USCHO did not release a poll in weeks 11, or 24.

== Awards and honors ==
Player	Award	Ref
Kyle Schmidt	Derek Hines Unsung Hero Award	
J. T. Brown	NCAA Tournament Most Outstanding Player	
Jack Connolly	AHCA West First Team All-American	
Mike Connolly	AHCA West Second Team All-American	
Jack Connolly	All-WCHA First Team	
Mike Connolly	All-WCHA First Team	
Justin Fontaine	All-WCHA Second Team	
Justin Faulk	All-WCHA Third Team	
Justin Faulk	WCHA All-Rookie Team	
J. T. Brown	WCHA All-Rookie Team	
J. T. Brown	NCAA All-Tournament Team	
Kyle Schmidt	NCAA All-Tournament Team	
Justin Faulk	NCAA All-Tournament Team	

== Players drafted into the NHL ==
=== 2008 NHL entry draft ===
= NHL All-Star team	= NHL All-Star	= NHL All-Star and NHL All-Star team	= Did not play in the NHL

Round	Pick	Player	NHL team
3	83	Andy Welinski^{†}	Anaheim Ducks
5	130	Tony Cameranesi^{†}	Toronto Maple Leafs

† incoming freshman
