= Matt Frattin =

Canadian ice hockey player (born 1988)

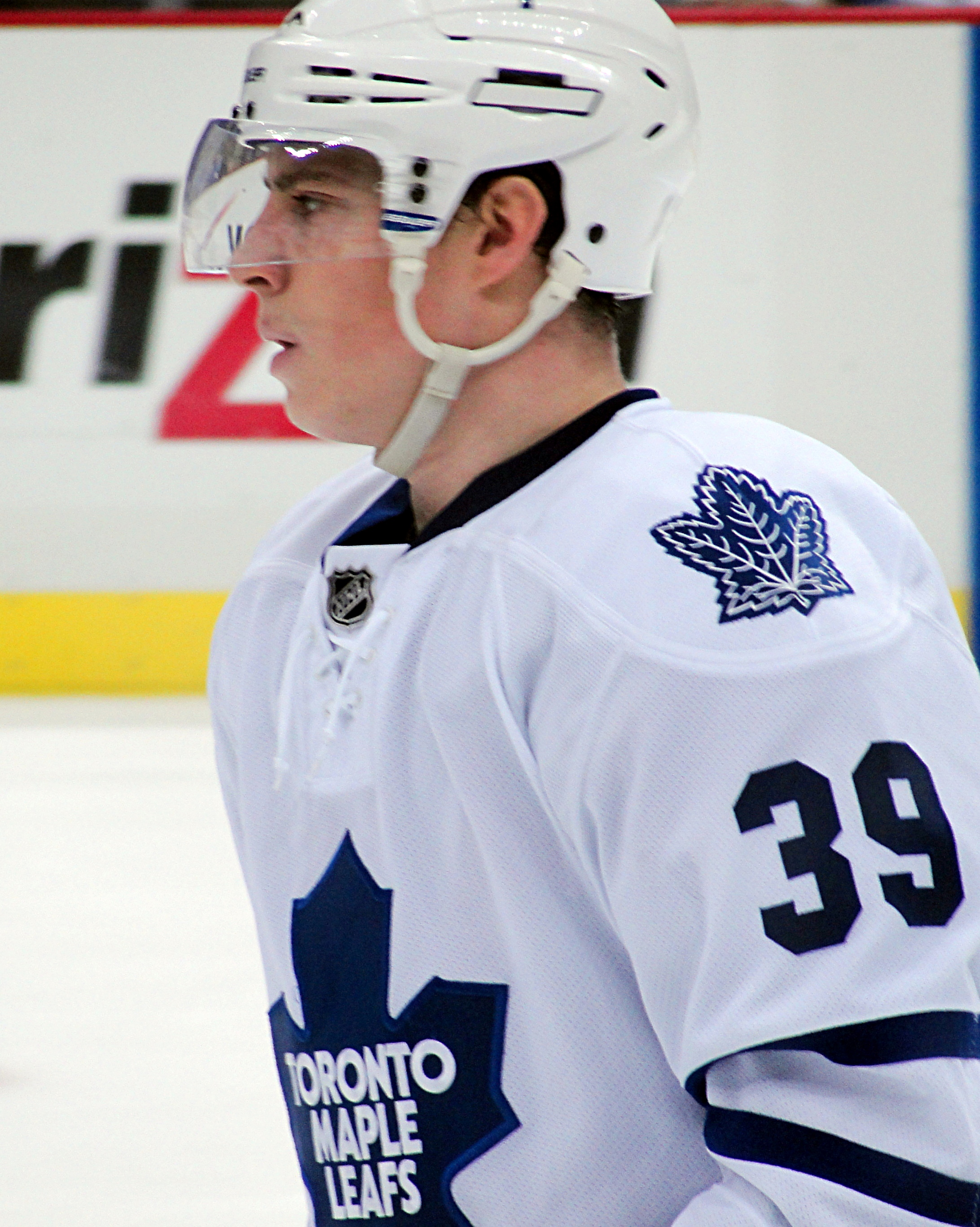
- Frattin with the Toronto Maple Leafs in 2012
- Born: January 3, 1988 (age 38) Edmonton, Alberta, Canada
- Height: 6 ft 0 in (183 cm)
- Weight: 205 lb (93 kg; 14 st 9 lb)
- Position: Right wing
- Shot: Right
- Played for: Toronto Maple Leafs; Los Angeles Kings; Columbus Blue Jackets; Stockton Heat; Barys Nur-Sultan; Lausanne HC; Ak Bars Kazan; HC Bolzano
- NHL draft: 99th overall, 2007; Toronto Maple Leafs
- Playing career: 2011–2023

Matthew Frattin (born January 3, 1988) is a Canadian former professional ice hockey right winger. He began his NHL career with the Toronto Maple Leafs, the organization that drafted him 99th overall in 2007. Frattin also played in the NHL for the Los Angeles Kings and Columbus Blue Jackets before rejoining Toronto in 2014 via a trade. Frattin spent a further season and a half in the Maple Leafs organization before being included in a nine-player trade with the Ottawa Senators.

At the end of his senior season of college ice hockey with the University of North Dakota, in 2010–11, Frattin was honored as the Western Collegiate Hockey Association (WCHA) Player of the Year, also being named a Hobey Baker Award finalist.

== Playing career ==
=== Amateur ===
Frattin was born in Edmonton, Alberta. As a youth, he played in the 2001 Quebec International Pee-Wee Hockey Tournament with the North West Hawks minor ice hockey team from Edmonton.

He played junior hockey for the Fort Saskatchewan Traders of the Alberta Junior Hockey League (AJHL) during the 2006–07 season. After playing junior A ice hockey in Alberta, he was then selected by the Toronto Maple Leafs in the fourth round, 99th overall, of the 2007 NHL entry draft. He then enrolled at the University of North Dakota in 2007.

In August of 2009, Frattin was dismissed from the UND squad due to a DUI -- his second alcohol-related run-in with the police in two months. Despite being offered a professional contract from the Maple Leafs, Frattin opted to return to school. With his scholarship taken away, he took out student loans and decided to earn his way back onto the roster. This was a success, as Frattin "cleaned" up his life and returned to become an integral part of the team.

Frattin scored a key goal in North Dakota's playoff victory over rivals the University of Minnesota in the 2010 Western Collegiate Hockey Association (WCHA) playoffs. At the beginning of the 2010–11 season, Frattin won the team's fitness competition after working out extensively during the off-season. In 2010, he also made headlines after the WCHA suspended him for one game due to a hit that he delivered against a Minnesota player.

In the 2010–11 season, Frattin had a highly-productive offensive year, leading the entire NCAA Men's Division I in goal-scoring, with 36, a total eclipsing his combined total from his first three collegiate years combined. His 36 goals was the third-highest single season total in Division I college hockey in the previous ten years, and the most since the University of Minnesota's Ryan Potulny scored 38 in the 2005–06 season. Frattin also set separate eight- and nine-game goal-scoring streaks during the season. He played a key role in North Dakota's success in the playoffs, scoring two game-winning goals in the WCHA playoffs en route to a Frozen Four appearance. At the end of the season, Frattin was named WCHA Player of the Year and was selected as a Hobey Baker Award finalist.

=== Professional ===
On April 8, 2011, at the end of the WCHA season, Frattin signed a two-year, entry-level contract with the Toronto Maple Leafs. He played in his first career NHL game the very next day, on April 9. His first career NHL goal was scored in the 2011–12 season on November 19, 2011, against goaltender Tomáš Vokoun of the Washington Capitals.

On July 1, 2012, Toronto signed Frattin to a two-year contract extension. On June 23, 2013, Frattin was traded to the Los Angeles Kings, along with goaltender Ben Scrivens and a conditional second-round draft pick, in exchange for goaltender Jonathan Bernier. On March 5, 2014, Frattin was again traded, this time to the Columbus Blue Jackets, along with a second-round pick and a conditional third-round pick, in exchange for All-Star Marián Gáborík.

After 4 games in Columbus, Frattin was then traded from the Blue Jackets back to the Maple Leafs on July 1, 2014, in exchange for Jerry D'Amigo and 2015 conditional seventh-round draft pick. He was then immediately signed to a two-year contract extension by Toronto.

Frattin spent most of his next two seasons in the AHL with the Marlies. In the 15–16 season, Frattin lost ice time to young players such as William Nylander and Connor Brown, but still produced in his limited role. On February 9, 2016, Frattin was included in a blockbuster nine-player deal that focused around Dion Phaneuf moving to the Ottawa Senators. It was the third time Frattin had been involved in a trade with the Maple Leafs in as many years. Frattin was loaned back to the Marlies the following day by the Senators to finish the season.

As a free agent from the Senators, Frattin opted to continue his career in the AHL, signing a one-year deal with the Stockton Heat, an affiliate of the Calgary Flames on September 1, 2016. On July 18, 2017, it was reported that Frattin had signed with Beijing's HC Kunlun Red Star, the only KHL team based in China. However it was later confirmed to have fallen through as he signed with fellow KHL club, Barys Astana, on August 23, 2017.

After two stints with Barys, Frattin as a free agent continued his tenure in the KHL, agreeing to a one-year contract with Ak Bars Kazan on May 4, 2019. In the following 2019–20 season, Frattin played among the club's top nine forwards, registering 8 goals and 28 points in 56 regular season games. He added 5 points in their first-round series sweep over HC Neftekhimik Nizhnekamsk before the remainder of the playoffs were cancelled due to the COVID-19 pandemic.

As a free agent, Frattin made a familiar return to Barys Nur-Sultan, agreeing to a one-year contract for his third stint with the club on May 19, 2020. In 2021, Frattin extended his contract to spend his 4th season with the club. After a rough start to the season was marked by Frattin catching COVID-19 in October, Frattin left the club to attend the birth of his daughter in December. It was already reported that Frattin was not returning, but the club finally agreed to a termination of his deal in March of 2022.

In June 2022, Frattin signed with HC Bolzano of the ICEHL. He had 9 goals and 17 assists for 26 points in 40 games, adding 8 points in 19 games in a run that saw Bolzano lose in the finals to EC Salzburg.

== Career statistics ==
			Regular season					Playoffs
Season	Team	League	GP	G	A	Pts	PIM	GP	G	A	Pts	PIM
2006–07	Fort Saskatchewan Traders	AJHL	58	49	34	83	75	15	5	6	11	10
2007–08	U. of North Dakota	WCHA	43	4	11	15	18	—	—	—	—	—
2008–09	U. of North Dakota	WCHA	42	13	12	25	48	—	—	—	—	—
2009–10	U. of North Dakota	WCHA	24	11	8	19	21	—	—	—	—	—
2010–11	U. of North Dakota	WCHA	44	36	24	60	42	—	—	—	—	—
2010–11	Toronto Maple Leafs	NHL	1	0	0	0	0	—	—	—	—	—
2011–12	Toronto Maple Leafs	NHL	56	8	7	15	25	—	—	—	—	—
2011–12	Toronto Marlies	AHL	23	14	4	18	20	13	10	3	13	6
2012–13	Toronto Marlies	AHL	21	9	8	17	14	—	—	—	—	—
2012–13	Toronto Maple Leafs	NHL	25	7	6	13	4	6	0	2	2	0
2013–14	Los Angeles Kings	NHL	40	2	4	6	11	—	—	—	—	—
2013–14	Columbus Blue Jackets	NHL	4	0	1	1	0	—	—	—	—	—
2014–15	Toronto Maple Leafs	NHL	9	0	0	0	4	—	—	—	—	—
2014–15	Toronto Marlies	AHL	59	26	22	48	26	5	3	3	6	14
2015–16	Toronto Marlies	AHL	71	13	21	34	51	1	0	0	0	0
2016–17	Stockton Heat	AHL	54	18	18	36	18	3	0	1	1	2
2017–18	Barys Astana	KHL	42	11	18	29	64	—	—	—	—	—
2017–18	Lausanne HC	NL	2	0	2	2	0	—	—	—	—	—
2018–19	Barys Astana	KHL	52	17	22	39	27	12	9	2	11	2
2019–20	Ak Bars Kazan	KHL	56	8	20	28	20	4	3	2	5	0
2020–21	Barys Nur-Sultan	KHL	49	11	16	27	16	6	1	2	3	6
2021–22	Barys Nur-Sultan	KHL	33	5	4	9	10	—	—	—	—	—
2022–23	HC Bolzano	ICEHL	40	9	17	26	14	19	4	4	8	4
NHL totals			135	17	18	35	44	6	0	2	2	0
KHL totals			232	52	80	132	137	22	13	6	19	8

== Awards and honours ==
Award	Year
College
All-WCHA First Team	2011
AHCA West First-Team All-American	2011
WCHA All-Tournament Team	2011

Awards and achievements
Preceded by Marc Cheverie	WCHA Player of the Year; 2010–11	Succeeded by Jack Connolly
Preceded by Evan Trupp	WCHA Most Outstanding Player in Tournament; 2011	Succeeded by Aaron Dell
