= Chris Marinucci =

American ice hockey player

- Born: December 29, 1971 (age 54) Grand Rapids, Minnesota, U.S.
- Height: 6 ft 0 in (183 cm)
- Weight: 175 lb (79 kg; 12 st 7 lb)
- Position: Center
- Shot: Left
- Played for: New York Islanders; Los Angeles Kings
- National team: United States
- NHL draft: 90th overall, 1990; New York Islanders
- Playing career: 1990–2004

Christopher Jon Marinucci (born December 29, 1971) is an American former professional ice hockey player who played briefly in the NHL with the Los Angeles Kings and the New York Islanders. He also played with the Denver Grizzlies, Utah Grizzlies, Phoenix Roadrunners, Chicago Wolves, Kokudo Tokyo, Eisbären Berlin, Idaho Steelheads, IF Björklöven and Storhamar Dragons.

At the start of his career, he first played four years with his University of Minnesota Duluth hockey team, earning conference MVP and the Hobey Baker award as college hockey's top player. He then was drafted in 1990 by the New York Islanders and played in the IHL with the Denver Grizzlies and made his debut in the NHL that year. He then moved on to different leagues, including DEL, the Japan and Sweden leagues, and the WCHL and the ECHL. However, he played most of his career with several teams in the IHL. In a 14-year span (1990–2004) he won 3 awards, and his last season was with the Idaho Steelheads in the ECHL. He was part of the cup winning Storhamar Dragons of the Norwegian Elite League 2004, after scoring the game winner of game six in overtime in dramatic fashion as he set up the decisive game seven where the Dragons beat Vålerenga Ishockey in double overtime.

== Career statistics ==
=== Regular season and playoffs ===
			Regular season					Playoffs
Season	Team	League	GP	G	A	Pts	PIM	GP	G	A	Pts	PIM
1988–89	Grand Rapids High School	HS-MN	25	24	18	42	—	—	—	—	—	—
1989–90	Grand Rapids High School	HS-MN	28	24	39	63	12	—	—	—	—	—
1990–91	University of Minnesota Duluth	WCHA	36	6	10	16	20	—	—	—	—	—
1991–92	University of Minnesota Duluth	WCHA	37	6	13	19	41	—	—	—	—	—
1992–93	University of Minnesota Duluth	WCHA	40	35	42	77	52	—	—	—	—	—
1993–94	University of Minnesota Duluth	WCHA	38	30	31	61	65	—	—	—	—	—
1994–95	Denver Grizzlies	IHL	74	29	40	69	42	14	3	4	7	12
1994–95	New York Islanders	NHL	12	1	4	5	2	—	—	—	—	—
1995–96	Utah Grizzlies	IHL	8	3	5	8	8	—	—	—	—	—
1996–97	Utah Grizzlies	IHL	21	3	13	16	6	—	—	—	—	—
1996–97	Los Angeles Kings	NHL	1	0	0	0	0	—	—	—	—	—
1996–97	Phoenix Roadrunners	IHL	62	23	29	52	26	—	—	—	—	—
1997–98	Chicago Wolves	IHL	78	27	48	75	35	22	7	6	13	12
1998–99	Chicago Wolves	IHL	82	41	40	81	24	10	3	5	8	10
1999–2000	Chicago Wolves	IHL	80	31	33	64	18	16	5	4	9	10
2000–01	Kokudo Tokyo	JPN	40	29	30	59	—	6	5	7	12	—
2001–02	Eisbären Berlin	DEL	53	10	26	36	24	4	0	0	0	6
2002–03	Idaho Steelheads	WCHL	26	12	20	32	2	—	—	—	—	—
2002–03	IF Björklöven	Allsv	12	6	7	13	6	4	2	4	6	2
2003–04	Idaho Steelheads	ECHL	13	5	8	13	4	—	—	—	—	—
2003–04	Storhamar Dragons	NOR	17	4	5	9	26	13	6	5	11	41
IHL totals			405	157	208	365	159	62	18	19	37	44

=== International ===
Year	Team	Event	GP	G	A	Pts	PIM
1997	United States	WC	8	1	0	1	2

== Awards and honors ==
Award	Year
All-WCHA Second Team	1992–93
All-WCHA First Team	1993–94
AHCA West First-Team All-American	1993–94

- Ken McKenzie Trophy - 1994–95
- IHL Man of the Year - 1998–99

Awards and achievements
Preceded by Derek Plante	WCHA Player of the Year; 1993–94	Succeeded by Brian Bonin
Preceded by Paul Kariya	Winner of the Hobey Baker Award; 1993–94	Succeeded by Brian Holzinger
