= Stephen Schultz =

American ice hockey player

- Born: December 7, 1987 (age 38) Westbury, New York, USA
- Height: 5 ft 11 in (180 cm)
- Weight: 181 lb (82 kg; 12 st 13 lb)
- Position: Right wing
- Shot: Right
- Played for: Texas Stars; Binghamton Senators; ESV Kaufbeuren; Wichita Thunder; Nottingham Panthers
- NHL draft: Undrafted
- Playing career: 2011–2017

Stephen Schultz (born December 7, 1987) is a retired American professional ice hockey player. He last played for the Nottingham Panthers of the UK EIHL.

On February 23, 2013, Schultz tied an ECHL single-game record when he scored four power-play goals to lead the Trenton Titans to a 6–0 win over the Reading Royals.

After a single high scoring season in the German DEL2 with ESV Kaufbeuren, Schultz returned to North America and signed a one-year contract with the Orlando Solar Bears of the ECHL on August 7, 2014. Prior to the 2014-15 season, Schultz was claimed off waivers by the Wichita Thunder on October 21, 2014.

== Career statistics ==
			Regular season					Playoffs
Season	Team	League	GP	G	A	Pts	PIM	GP	G	A	Pts	PIM
2005–06	New York Bobcats	AtJHL	38	24	31	55	84	2	1	4	5	0
2006–07	Lincoln Stars	USHL	57	31	32	63	74	4	0	5	5	4
2007–08	Colorado College	NCAA	21	4	3	7	24	—	—	—	—	—
2008–09	Colorado College	NCAA	35	10	4	14	38	—	—	—	—	—
2009–10	Colorado College	NCAA	28	5	15	20	24	—	—	—	—	—
2010–11	Colorado College	NCAA	43	17	30	47	36	—	—	—	—	—
2010–11	Texas Stars	AHL	5	0	0	0	2	—	—	—	—	—
2011–12	Texas Stars	AHL	34	8	3	11	20	—	—	—	—	—
2011–12	Idaho Steelheads	ECHL	2	2	1	3	0	—	—	—	—	—
2012–13	Binghamton Senators	AHL	3	0	0	0	0	—	—	—	—	—
2012–13	Trenton Titans	ECHL	55	27	27	54	26	—	—	—	—	—
2013–14	ESV Kaufbeuren	DEL2	48	18	32	50	59	—	—	—	—	—
2014–15	Wichita Thunder	ECHL	12	3	10	13	12	—	—	—	—	—
2014–15	Starbulls Rosenheim	DEL2	17	8	10	18	16	7	3	6	9	14
2015–16	Nottingham Panthers	EIHL	32	13	16	29	24	4	2	3	5	0
2016–17	Nottingham Panthers	EIHL	38	15	27	42	28	2	0	3	3	2
AHL totals			42	8	3	11	22	—	—	—	—	—
ECHL totals			69	32	38	70	38	—	—	—	—	—
DEL2 totals			65	26	42	68	75	7	3	6	9	14
EIHL totals			70	28	43	71	52	6	2	6	8	2
