= Joe Howe (ice hockey) =

American ice hockey player and coach (born 1990)

Current position
- Title: Interim head coach
- Team: Yale
- Conference: ECAC Hockey
- Record: 7–15–0 (.318)

Biographical details
- Born: March 5, 1990 (age 36); Plymouth, Minnesota, U.S.
- Education: Colorado College

Playing career
- 2007–2009: Waterloo Black Hawks
- 2009–2013: Colorado College
- 2013–2014: Cincinnati Cyclones
- 2013–2014: Missouri Mavericks
- 2014–2015: Utah Grizzlies
- 2014–2015: Reading Royals
- 2014–2015: Rapid City Rush
- 2014–2015: Orlando Solar Bears
- Position: Goaltender

Coaching career (HC unless noted)
- 2015–2017: Denver (Asst.)
- 2017–2018: Denver (Dir. of Hockey Ops)
- 2018–2021: Alaska (Asst.)
- 2021–2025: Yale (Asst.)
- 2025–present: Yale (interim)

Head coaching record
- Overall: 7–15–0 (.318)

Accomplishments and honors

Championships
- 2017 NCAA National Champion (Asst.)

Joe Howe (born March 5, 1990) is an American ice hockey coach and former goaltender. He is currently the interim Malcolm G. Chace Head Coach of Men's Hockey at Yale.

== Career ==
Joe Howe began his career in college hockey with Colorado College in 2009. He became the team's starting goaltender as a freshman (for which he was named to the WCHA All–Rookie Team) and served in that capacity for most of his four-year tenure with the program. His performance in Colorado Springs was enough to earn Howe a professional career after graduating, however, he saw limited success. In two years, Howe played for six different clubs. While his numbers weren't bad they weren't enough to make any of his teams want to keep him around. After the 2014–15 season, Howe hung up his skates and embarked on a coaching career.

His first stop was as a volunteer assistant/goaltending coach for Denver. Despite having played for the Pioneers' arch-rival, Howe proved to be a welcome addition to the staff and helped turn Denver's starting goaltender, Tanner Jaillet into a two-time All-American. The goaltender was outstanding while backstopping Denver to the National championship in 2017. After serving as the Director of Hockey Operations for the program in 2018, Howe got his first full-time assistant position with Alaska. While there, Howe worked with the offense, defense and goaltending positions as well as the Nanooks' power play unit.

After the COVID-19 pandemic, Howe was hired for a similar role at Yale. Just four years later, after the retirement of Keith Allain, Howe was named the team's interim head coach.

== Playing career statistics ==
			Regular season									Playoffs
Season	Team	League	GP	W	L	T	MIN	GA	SO	GAA	SV%	GP	W	L	MIN	GA	SO	GAA	SV%
2007–08	Waterloo Black Hawks	USHL	22	13	5	1	1215	43	2	2.12	.915	—	—	—	—	—	—	—	—
2008–09	Waterloo Black Hawks	USHL	34	17	13	2	1865	109	1	3.51	.882	—	—	—	—	—	—	—	—
2009–10	Colorado College	WCHA	36	17	15	3	2097	98	3	2.80	.907	—	—	—	—	—	—	—	—
2010–11	Colorado College	WCHA	36	18	15	2	2081	102	3	2.94	.903	—	—	—	—	—	—	—	—
2011–12	Colorado College	WCHA	16	5	8	1	827	48	0	3.48	.882	—	—	—	—	—	—	—	—
2012–13	Colorado College	WCHA	31	14	12	4	1754	87	2	2.98	.915	—	—	—	—	—	—	—	—
2013–14	Cincinnati Cyclones	ECHL	18	10	3	4	1058	49	1	2.78	.907	—	—	—	—	—	—	—	—
2013–14	Missouri Mavericks	CHL	7	3	2	1	405	17	0	2.52	.915	—	—	—	—	—	—	—	—
2014–15	Utah Grizzlies	ECHL	8	3	3	2	478	29	0	3.64	.886	—	—	—	—	—	—	—	—
2014–15	Reading Royals	ECHL	2	1	0	0	104	4	0	2.30	.905	—	—	—	—	—	—	—	—
2014–15	Rapid City Rush	ECHL	5	2	1	0	232	16	0	4.14	.846	—	—	—	—	—	—	—	—
2014–15	Orlando Solar Bears	ECHL	3	1	1	1	147	8	0	3.27	.881	—	—	—	—	—	—	—	—

== Head coaching record ==
Record table
Season	Team	Overall	Conference	Standing	Postseason
Yale Bulldogs (ECAC Hockey) (2025–present)
2025–26	Yale	7–15–0	6–8–0		
Yale:		7–15–0	6–8–0		
Total:		7–15–0 (.318)			
National champion Postseason invitational champion Conference regular season champion Conference regular season and conference tournament champion Division regular season champion Division regular season and conference tournament champion Conference tournament champion

== Awards and honors ==
Award	Year
WCHA All-Rookie Team	2009–10
