= Chad Erickson =

American ice hockey player (born 1970)

- Born: August 21, 1970 (age 55) Minneapolis, Minnesota, U.S.
- Height: 5 ft 10 in (178 cm)
- Weight: 190 lb (86 kg; 13 st 8 lb)
- Position: Goaltender
- Caught: Right
- Played for: New Jersey Devils
- Playing career: 1991–2001

Chad Carlyle Erickson (born August 21, 1970) is an American former professional ice hockey goaltender.

== Career ==
Erickson played two games in the National Hockey League, both for the New Jersey Devils in 1991–92. He won one game, lost the other and had a 4.50 goals against average. He never returned to the NHL but played for numerous minor league teams between 1991 and 2000. He was a Western Collegiate Hockey Association Second-Team All-Star and National Collegiate Athletic Association West First All-American team selection in 1990 while playing for the Minnesota Duluth Bulldogs.

== Career statistics ==
=== Regular season and playoffs ===
			Regular season									Playoffs
Season	Team	League	GP	W	L	T	MIN	GA	SO	GAA	SV%	GP	W	L	MIN	GA	SO	GAA	SV%
1986–87	Warroad High School	HS-MN	21	—	—	—	945	36	1	2.29	—	—	—	—	—	—	—	—	—
1987–88	Warroad High School	HS-MN	24	—	—	—	1080	33	7	1.83	—	—	—	—	—	—	—	—	—
1988–89	University of Minnesota-Duluth	WCHA	15	5	7	1	821	49	0	3.58	.890	—	—	—	—	—	—	—	—
1989–90	University of Minnesota-Duluth	WCHA	39	19	19	1	2301	141	0	3.68	.895	—	—	—	—	—	—	—	—
1990–91	University of Minnesota-Duluth	WCHA	40	14	19	7	2393	159	0	3.99	.880	—	—	—	—	—	—	—	—
1991–92	New Jersey Devils	NHL	2	1	1	0	120	9	0	4.50	.836	—	—	—	—	—	—	—	—
1991–92	Utica Devils	AHL	43	18	19	3	2341	147	2	3.77	.888	2	0	2	127	11	0	5.20	.867
1992–93	Utica Devils	AHL	9	1	7	1	505	47	0	5.58	.848	—	—	—	—	—	—	—	—
1992–93	Cincinnati Cyclones	IHL	10	2	6	1	516	42	0	4.88	.860	—	—	—	—	—	—	—	—
1992–93	Birmingham Bulls	ECHL	14	6	6	2	856	54	0	3.79	.876	—	—	—	—	—	—	—	—
1993–94	Albany River Rats	AHL	4	2	1	0	183	13	0	4.25	.859	—	—	—	—	—	—	—	—
1993–94	Raleigh IceCaps	ECHL	32	19	9	3	1883	101	0	3.22	.895	6	3	1	286	21	0	4.40	—
1994–95	Albany River Rats	AHL	1	1	0	0	60	2	0	2.00	.939	—	—	—	—	—	—	—	—
1994–95	Providence Bruins	AHL	7	1	6	0	351	33	0	5.64	.808	—	—	—	—	—	—	—	—
1994–95	Springfield Falcons	AHL	1	0	0	0	23	3	0	7.78	.833	—	—	—	—	—	—	—	—
1994–95	Raleigh IceCaps	ECHL	11	1	8	1	587	45	0	4.60	.856	—	—	—	—	—	—	—	—
1995–96	Birmingham Bulls	ECHL	44	16	20	4	2410	201	0	5.00	.873	—	—	—	—	—	—	—	—
1996–97	Austin Ice Bats	WPHL	32	18	11	2	1875	122	0	3.90	.903	5	2	2	281	19	0	4.06	.892
1997–98	Austin Ice Bats	WPHL	51	26	13	10	2987	172	0	3.45	.899	—	—	—	—	—	—	—	—
1998–99	San Angelo Outlaws	WPHL	49	31	14	3	2841	156	0	3.29	.917	17	9	7	1033	58	0	3.37	.907
1999–00	Tulsa Oilers	CHL	45	25	16	2	2541	145	1	3.42	.897	3	0	2	164	10	0	3.67	.909
2000–01	Tulsa Oilers	CHL	17	10	7	0	853	55	1	3.87	.886	—	—	—	—	—	—	—	—
NHL totals			22	1	1	0	120	9	0	4.50	.836	—	—	—	—	—	—	—	—

== Awards and honours ==
Award	Year
All-WCHA First Team	1989–90
AHCA West First-Team All-American	1989–90
