= Mitch Thompson =

American baseball coach

Current position
- Title: Head coach
- Team: Baylor
- Conference: Big 12
- Record: 103–114

Biographical details
- Born: 1965 or 1966 (age 60–61); Goodland, Kansas, U.S.

Playing career
- 1984: Cloud County CC
- 1985: Bacone
- 1986–1988: Fort Hays State

Coaching career (HC unless noted)
- 1990: Mississippi State (GA)
- 1991: Radford (asst.)
- 1992–1993: Mississippi State (H/IF)
- 1994: Auburn (asst.)
- 1995–2012: Baylor (asst./AHC)
- 2013–2022: McLennan
- 2023–present: Baylor

Head coaching record
- Overall: 103–114 (NCAA DI) 372–138–1 (NJCAA)
- Tournaments: NCAA: 0–0

Accomplishments and honors

Championships
- NJCAA National (2021); 4× Region 5 Tournament (15,17,21–22); 3× NTJCAC Regular Season (16–17,21)

Mitch Thompson (born 1965 or 1966) is an American baseball coach and former player, who is the current head baseball coach of the Baylor Bears. He played college baseball at Cloud County Community College in 1984, transferring to Bacone College in 1985, before ultimately transferring to Fort Hays State where he played from 1986 to 1988. He served as the head coach of the McLennan Highlanders (2013–2022).

== Playing career ==
Thompson grew up in Goodland, Kansas. He attended Cloud County Community College as a freshman. He would transfer to Bacone College for the 1985 season. Thompson made his final transfer to Fort Hays State University, where he was a two-time Academic All-American and a 1988 team captain.

== Coaching career ==
Thompson began his coaching career as a graduate assistant for the Mississippi State Bulldogs. He moved to Virginia in 1991, working as a paid assistant for the Radford Highlanders. He returned to Mississippi State for the 1992 and 1993 seasons. He would also join the Auburn Tigers for a season in 1994.

Thompson joined Steve Smith's staff as the hitting coach of the Baylor Bears in 1995, where he finally found a long-term home. After 15 years on Smith's staff, he was promoted to Assistant head coach. Following the 2013 season, he accepted the head coaching position at McLennan Community College.

On June 15, 2022, Thompson was named the head coach of the Baylor Bears.

== Head coaching record ==
Record table
Season	Team	Overall	Conference	Standing	Postseason
McLennan CC Highlanders (NTJCAC) (2014–2022)
2014	McLennan CC	32–27	17–15		
2015	McLennan CC	41–20	19–13	1st	NJCAA Runner–Up
2016	McLennan CC	45–12	25–7	1st	
2017	McLennan CC	52–13	26–6	1st	NJCAA 3rd Round
2018	McLennan CC	44–15	25–7		
2019	McLennan CC	42–17	24–8		
2020	McLennan CC	19–5	5–1		rest of season and post canceled due to CoVid19
2021	McLennan CC	47–16	27–7	1st	NJCAA National
2022	McLennan CC	50–13–1	28–4		NJCAA
McLennan CCC:		372–138–1	196–68		
Baylor Bears (Big 12 Conference) (2023–present)
2023	Baylor	20–35	6–18	9th	
2024	Baylor	22–31	10–20	10th	
2025	Baylor	33–22	13–17	T–9th	Big 12 tournament
2026	Baylor	28–26	14–16	8th	Big 12 tournament
Baylor:		103–114	43–71		
Total:		103–114			
National champion Postseason invitational champion Conference regular season champion Conference regular season and conference tournament champion Division regular season champion Division regular season and conference tournament champion Conference tournament champion
