= Sean Dolan (ice hockey) =

American professional ice hockey player

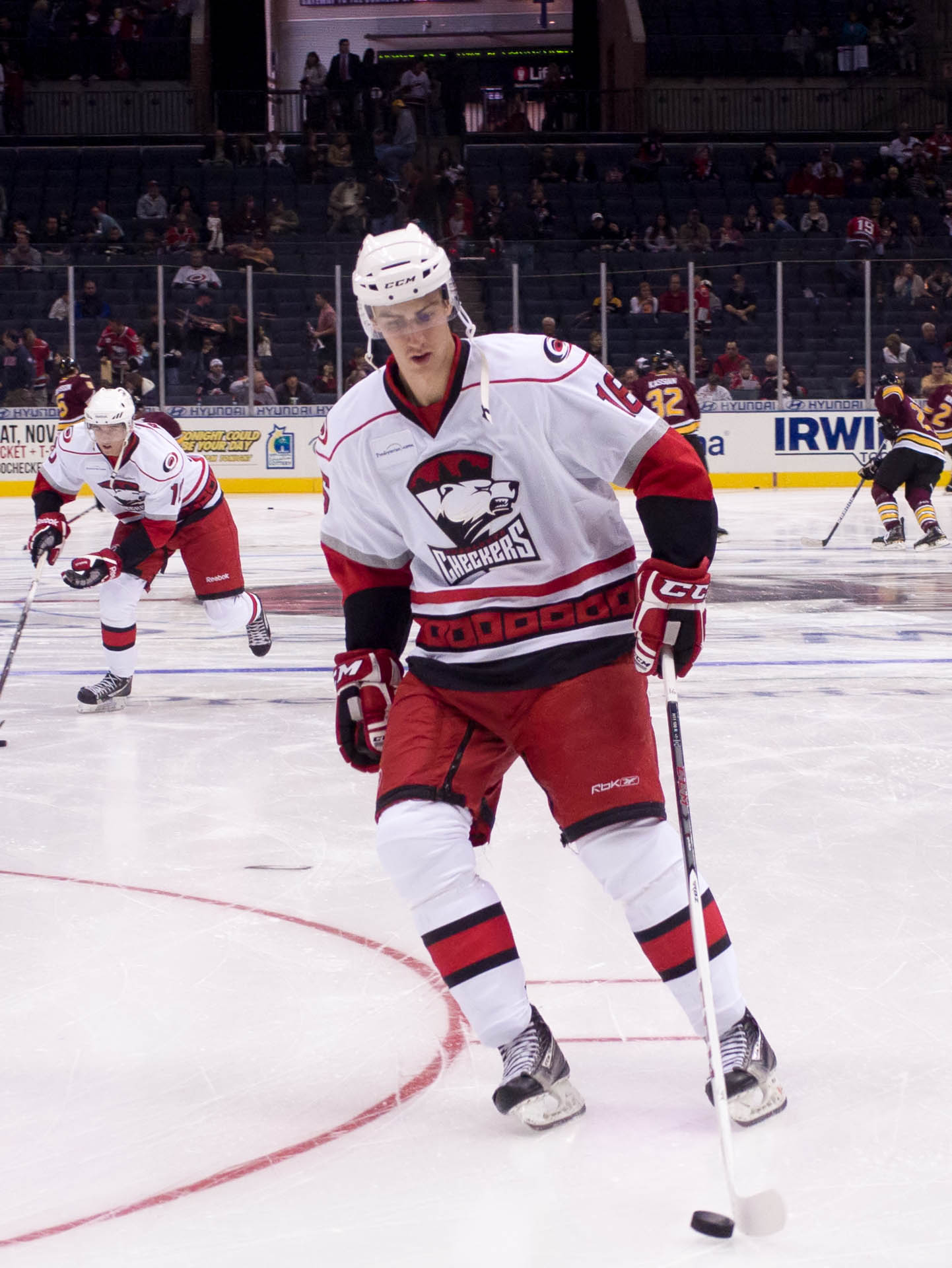
- Born: February 11, 1988 (age 38) Chesterfield, Missouri, US
- Height: 6 ft 2 in (188 cm)
- Weight: 215 lb (98 kg; 15 st 5 lb)
- Position: Center
- Shot: Right
- Played for: Charlotte Checkers; Lausitzer Füchse
- NHL draft: Undrafted
- Playing career: 2011–2016

Sean Dolan (born February 11, 1988) is an American retired professional ice hockey player. He last played with the Lausitzer Füchse of the German DEL2 league.

== Playing career ==
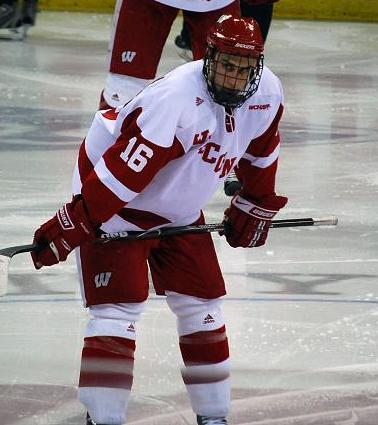
Dolan playing with the Wisconsin Badgers in 2009

Dolan attended the University of Wisconsin where he played four seasons (2007-2011) of college hockey with the NCAA Division I Wisconsin Badgers men's ice hockey team, scoring 42 points and registering 118 penalty minutes in 143 career games.

Dolan made his professional debut during the 2010–11 season playing in the ECHL with the South Carolina Stingrays. He also started the 2011–12 campaign with the Stingrays, but after 32 ECHL games Dolan was called up to join the Charlotte Checkers of the AHL.

On July 30, 2013, Dolan was extended by the Checkers on a one-year deal for his third season with the club.

A free agent, Dolan agreed to try out with the Chicago Wolves at their 2014 training camp on September 30, 2014. After his release, Dolan opted to return to the South Carolina Stingrays on a one-year contract on October 7, 2014.

On August 29, 2015, Dolan left the Stingrays organization as a free agent and signed his first contract abroad, agreeing to a one-year deal with German club, Lausitzer Füchse of the DEL2. He was waived in mid-December 2015.

== Career statistics ==
			Regular season					Playoffs
Season	Team	League	GP	G	A	Pts	PIM	GP	G	A	Pts	PIM
2004–05	Indiana Ice	USHL	28	3	2	5	8	3	0	0	0	0
2005–06	Indiana Ice	USHL	27	5	5	10	38	—	—	—	—	—
2005–06	Cedar Rapids RoughRiders	USHL	23	2	1	3	40	3	0	0	0	0
2006–07	Chicago Steel	USHL	59	22	18	40	76	5	2	2	4	6
2007–08	University of Wisconsin	WCHA	40	4	4	8	32	—	—	—	—	—
2008–09	University of Wisconsin	WCHA	35	4	7	11	42	—	—	—	—	—
2009–10	University of Wisconsin	WCHA	27	3	4	7	22	—	—	—	—	—
2010–11	University of Wisconsin	WCHA	41	7	9	16	22	—	—	—	—	—
2010–11	South Carolina Stingrays	ECHL	4	0	1	1	0	4	1	2	3	0
2011–12	South Carolina Stingrays	ECHL	32	7	13	20	10	—	—	—	—	—
2011–12	Charlotte Checkers	AHL	35	5	5	10	31	—	—	—	—	—
2012–13	Charlotte Checkers	AHL	57	4	2	6	31	2	1	0	1	0
2013–14	Charlotte Checkers	AHL	50	5	10	15	27	—	—	—	—	—
2013–14	Florida Everblades	ECHL	3	2	2	4	2	—	—	—	—	—
2014–15	South Carolina Stingrays	ECHL	8	2	1	3	2	27	5	5	10	16
2014–15	Charlotte Checkers	AHL	12	0	0	0	4	—	—	—	—	—
AHL totals			154	14	17	31	93	2	1	0	1	0
