= Derek Plante =

American ice hockey player and coach

- Born: January 17, 1971 (age 55) Cloquet, Minnesota, U.S.
- Height: 5 ft 11 in (180 cm)
- Weight: 181 lb (82 kg; 12 st 13 lb)
- Position: Center
- Shot: Left
- Played for: Buffalo Sabres; Dallas Stars; Chicago Blackhawks; Philadelphia Flyers
- National team: United States
- NHL draft: 161st overall, 1989; Buffalo Sabres
- Playing career: 1993–2008
- Coaching career

Biographical details
- Education: University of Minnesota Duluth

Playing career
- 1989–1993: Minnesota Duluth
- Position: Center

Coaching career (HC unless noted)
- 2010–2015: Minnesota Duluth (asso.)
- 2015–2020: Chicago Blackhawks (dev.)
- 2020–2022: Minnesota Duluth (asso.)
- 2022–Present: Chicago Blackhawks (asst.)

Derek John Plante (born January 17, 1971) is an American ice hockey coach and former professional ice hockey player. Plante played eight seasons in the National Hockey League (NHL) for the Buffalo Sabres, Dallas Stars, Chicago Blackhawks and Philadelphia Flyers. He was a member of the 1999 Stanley Cup champion Dallas Stars. He was an assistant coach at the University of Minnesota-Duluth from 2010 to 2015 before returning to the program as associate head coach in 2020. Plante left UMD in 2022 to become an assistant coach for the Chicago Blackhawks.

== Playing career ==
Drafted out of high school by the Buffalo Sabres in 1989, Plante attended the University of Minnesota Duluth and by his senior year was an All-Star leading the WCHA in goals, assists, and total scoring. Plante skipped minor league hockey and jumped right to the NHL in 1994, replacing an injured Pat LaFontaine and scoring 21 goals. By turning pro so quickly, Plante missed out on an opportunity to represent the United States in the 1994 Winter Olympics.

In the lockout-shortened 1994–95 season, Plante managed only three goals and 19 assists, but rebounded nicely in 1995–96 on a rebuilding, but hard-working Sabres squad, netting 23 goals and adding 30 assists. In 1997, Plante became the Sabres' top scoring center. he netted a career high 27 goals and led the surprising Sabres squad to a Northeast Division championship and playoff berth. Plante scored the game winning, series-clinching game seven overtime goal against the Ottawa Senators. Plante knocked down an opponent pass at center, quickly positioned himself, and fired a slapshot that managed to escape the glove of netminder Ron Tugnutt and trickle into the goal. Mobbed by his ecstatic teammates, Plante suffered a cut lip in the ensuing celebration. Plante played well in the next series vs. Eric Lindros and the Philadelphia Flyers, but the overmatched team fell in five games.

Plante's numbers slipped in 1997–98, scoring only 13 goals and 34 points; however, the Sabres advanced deeper into the playoffs than many expected, losing to the Washington Capitals in the Eastern Conference Final.

Halfway through the 1999 season Plante was traded to the Dallas Stars. The Stars went all the way to the Stanley Cup finals and met Plante's old team, the Sabres. Plante had played in the first two series of the playoffs, scoring a critical goal in the second round, but was a healthy scratch for every game of the finals, which the Stars won 4 games to 2. Even though he didn't play in the finals, Plante got in on the time-honored tradition of taking personal stewardship of the Cup, which he spent in his hometown of Cloquet, Minnesota. The Dallas Stars had Plante's name engraved on the Stanley Cup even though he did not play in the required number of games.

The following year, Plante found himself in the Chicago Blackhawks organization. For the first time in his career, Plante played on a minor league team, the Chicago Wolves.

In 2000–01, Plante starred for the AHL Philadelphia Phantoms, and by the end of the year was called up to join the Philadelphia Flyers. The Flyers kept Derek on their playoff roster to face the Sabres. Plante scored a goal against his former teammate Dominik Hašek earlier in the season, but the Sabres prevailed, and Plante hasn't been back in the NHL since.

Plante later went on to play in European leagues, most notably with the Munich Barons. From 2005 to 2007, he played in the Asian Hockey League as a member of the Nippon Paper Cranes, winning the championship in 2007. During 2007–2008, he played for the SC Langenthal.

== Coaching career ==
He was hired on June 9, 2010, as a Minnesota Duluth assistant men's hockey coach. In June 2015, he announced he was resigning from his assistant coaching position with UMD. On July 17, 2020, it was announced that he would return to Minnesota Duluth, as associate men's hockey coach.

On July 29, 2022, Plante was named as an assistant coach for the Chicago Blackhawks on the staff of Luke Richardson. He remains in his role, after Richardson was replaced by Anders Sörensen in November 2024.

== Personal life ==
Plante has three sons: Zam, Max, and Victor. All three play college ice hockey at Minnesota Duluth. Zam was drafted in the fifth round, 150th overall by the Pittsburgh Penguins in the 2022 NHL entry draft. Max was drafted in the second round, 47th overall, by the Detroit Red Wings in the 2024 NHL entry draft, and was an important part of the United States gold medal performance at the 2025 World Junior Ice Hockey Championships.

== Career statistics ==
=== Regular season and playoffs ===
			Regular season					Playoffs
Season	Team	League	GP	G	A	Pts	PIM	GP	G	A	Pts	PIM
1987–88	Cloquet High School	HS-MN	23	16	25	41		—	—	—	—	—
1988–89	Cloquet High School	HS-MN	24	30	33	63		—	—	—	—	—
1989–90	University of Minnesota Duluth	WCHA	28	10	11	21	12	—	—	—	—	—
1990–91	University of Minnesota Duluth	WCHA	36	23	20	43	6	—	—	—	—	—
1991–92	University of Minnesota Duluth	WHCA	37	27	36	63	28	—	—	—	—	—
1992–93	University of Minnesota Duluth	WCHA	37	36	56	92	30	—	—	—	—	—
1993–94	Buffalo Sabres	NHL	77	21	35	56	24	7	1	0	1	0
1994–95	Buffalo Sabres	NHL	47	3	19	22	12	—	—	—	—	—
1995–96	Buffalo Sabres	NHL	76	23	33	56	28	—	—	—	—	—
1996–97	Buffalo Sabres	NHL	82	27	26	53	24	12	4	6	10	4
1997–98	Buffalo Sabres	NHL	72	13	21	34	26	11	0	3	3	10
1998–99	Buffalo Sabres	NHL	41	4	11	15	12	—	—	—	—	—
1998–99	Dallas Stars	NHL	10	2	3	5	6	6	1	0	1	4
1999–2000	Dallas Stars	NHL	16	1	1	2	2	—	—	—	—	—
1999–2000	Michigan K-Wings	IHL	13	0	4	4	2	—	—	—	—	—
1999–2000	Chicago Wolves	IHL	4	2	1	3	2	8	3	1	4	6
1999–2000	Chicago Blackhawks	NHL	17	1	1	2	2	—	—	—	—	—
2000–01	Philadelphia Flyers	NHL	12	1	2	3	4	5	0	1	1	0
2000–01	Philadelphia Phantoms	AHL	57	18	35	53	19	—	—	—	—	—
2001–02	München Barons	DEL	60	20	38	58	22	9	3	7	10	10
2002–03	ZSC Lions	NLA	44	22	24	46	34	10	1	2	3	4
2003–04	Adler Mannheim	DEL	39	6	16	22	40	6	0	0	0	2
2004–05	Adler Mannheim	DEL	44	6	7	13	22	7	0	0	0	0
2005–06	Nippon Paper Cranes	ALH	35	28	47	75	64	8	7	8	15	4
2006–07	Nippon Paper Cranes	ALH	24	20	27	47	42	7	6	7	13	12
2007–08	SC Langenthal	NLB	38	24	20	44	30	4	3	0	3	6
NHL totals			450	96	152	248	140	41	6	10	16	18

=== International ===
Year	Team	Event	GP	G	A	Pts	PIM
1991	United States	WJC	7	1	2	3	4
1992	United States	WC	6	0	1	1	0
1993	United States	WC	6	1	0	1	2
1996	United States	WC	8	1	1	2	4
2000	United States	WC	7	1	1	2	4
2001	United States	WC	9	0	2	2	2
2002	United States	WC	7	2	1	3	2
Senior totals			43	5	6	11	14

== Awards and honors ==
Award	Year	Ref.
All-WCHA Second Team	1991–92	
All-WCHA First Team	1992–93	
AHCA West First-Team All-American	1992–93	
WCHA All-Tournament Team	1993	

Awards and achievements
Preceded by Duane Derksen	WCHA Player of the Year; 1992–93	Succeeded by Chris Marinucci
