= 2010–11 NCAA Division I men's ice hockey rankings =

- NCAA tournament: 2011
- NCAA champion: Minnesota–Duluth
- Preseason No. 1 (USA Today): Boston College
- Preseason No. 1 (USCHO): Boston College
- NCAA Division I men's ice hockey rankings

Two human polls made up the 2010–11 NCAA Division I men's ice hockey rankings, the USCHO.com/CBS College Sports poll and the USA Today/USA Hockey Magazine poll. As the 2010–11 season progressed, rankings were updated weekly.

== Legend ==
	Increase in ranking
	Decrease in ranking
	Not ranked previous week
(Italics)	Number of first place votes
#–#–#	Win–loss–tie record
т	Tied with team above or below also with this symbol

== USCHO ==
	Preseason Oct 4	Week 1 Oct 11	Week 2 Oct 18	Week 3 Oct 25	Week 4 Nov 1	Week 5 Nov 8	Week 6 Nov 15	Week 7 Nov 22	Week 8 Nov 29	Week 9 Dec 6	Week 10 Dec 13	Week 12 Jan 3	Week 13 Jan 10	Week 14 Jan 17	Week 15 Jan 25	Week 16 Jan 31	Week 17 Feb 7	Week 18 Feb 14	Week 19 Feb 21	Week 20 Feb 28	Week 21 Mar 7	Week 22 Mar 14	Week 23 Mar 21	Final Apr 11	
1.	Boston College (45)	Boston College (1–0–0) (48)	Boston College (3–0–0) (49)	Miami (4–1–1) (28)	Miami (5–1–2) (33)	Boston University (6–0–2) (31)	Minnesota–Duluth (9–1–2) (36)	Minnesota–Duluth (11–1–2) (49)	Minnesota–Duluth (11–1–2) (49)	Yale (10–1–0) (34)	Yale (11–1–0) (45)	Yale (12–1–0) (45)	Yale (14–1–0) (45)	Yale (15–2–0) (38)	Yale (17–2–0) (46)	Boston College (18–6–0) (41)	Boston College (19–6–0) (47)	Boston College (21–6–0) (50)	North Dakota (22–8–3) (21)	North Dakota (24–8–3) (42)	North Dakota (26–8–3) (39)	North Dakota (28–8–3) (42)	North Dakota (30–8–3) (37)	Minnesota–Duluth (26–10–6) (48)	1.
2.	North Dakota (3)	North Dakota (1–0–1) (2)	North Dakota (3–0–1) (1)	Boston College (3–1–0) (19)	Minnesota–Duluth (6–0–2) (8)	Minnesota–Duluth (7–1–2) (11)	Boston University (6–0–4) (11)	Boston University (7–1–4) (1)	Boston University (7–1–5) (1)	Minnesota–Duluth (12–2–2) (13)	New Hampshire (10–2–4) (1)	North Dakota (14–5–2) (2)	North Dakota (16–5–2) (2)	North Dakota (17–6–2) (9)	Boston College (17–6–0) (4)	Denver (16–5–5) (6)	Yale (19–4–0) (1)	North Dakota (21–8–2)	Boston College (22–7–1) (13)	Boston College (24–7–1) (6)	Boston College (26–7–1) (10)	Boston College (28–7–1) (7)	Boston College (30–7–1) (7)	North Dakota (32–9–3) (2)	2.
3.	Miami (2)	Michigan (2–0–1)	Miami (2–1–1)	Minnesota–Duluth (5–0–1) (1)	Boston University (6–0–1) (7)	Yale (4–0–0) (5)	Maine (6–1–3) (1)	Yale (7–1–0)	Yale (8–1–0)	New Hampshire (9–2–4)	North Dakota (13–5–2) (2)	Boston College (13–5–0) (3)	Boston College (15–5–0) (3)	Boston College (15–6–0) (1)	Denver (16–5–5)	Yale (17–4–0) (2)	Minnesota–Duluth (18–5–4) (1)	Yale (20–5–0)	Yale (22–5–0) (15)	Yale (23–5–1) (1)	Yale (23–5–1) (1)	Yale (25–6–1) (1)	Yale (27–6–1) (5)	Michigan (29–11–4)	3.
4.	St. Cloud State	Miami (1–1–0)	Michigan (2–0–2)	Michigan (3–1–2)	Boston College (4–2–0) (1)	Miami (5–2–3) (2)	Nebraska–Omaha (8–1–1) (2)	Nebraska–Omaha (9–2–1)	Nebraska–Omaha (9–2–1)	Boston College (11–5–0) (3)	Minnesota–Duluth (12–3–3)	New Hampshire (10–3–4)	New Hampshire (12–3–4)	Denver (14–5–5) (1)	North Dakota (18–7–2)	Minnesota–Duluth (17–5–3) (1)	Denver (17–6–5)	Denver (18–7–5)	Merrimack (21–5–4) (1)	Union (25–7–4) (1)	Union (25–7–4)	Michigan (25–9–4)	Miami (23–9–6) (1)	Notre Dame (25–14–5)	4.
5.	Michigan	Yale (0–0–0)	Yale (0–0–0)	Yale (0–0–0)	Yale (2–0–0) (1)	Maine (4–1–3)	Yale (5–1–0)	Miami (8–3–3)	New Hampshire (7–2–4)	North Dakota (11–5–2)	Boston College (11–5–0) (2)	Minnesota–Duluth (12–4–3)	Minnesota–Duluth (14–4–3)	Minnesota–Duluth (15–5–3)	Minnesota–Duluth (17–5–3)	North Dakota (19–8–2)	North Dakota (19–8–2)	Minnesota–Duluth (18–6–5)	Union (24–7–3)	Denver (20–9–5)	Michigan (23–9–4)	Denver (23–10–5)	Denver (24–11–5)	Boston College (30–8–1)	5.
6.	Yale	Denver (1–0–1)	Minnesota–Duluth (3–0–1)	Boston University (4–0–1) (2)	Michigan (4–1–3)	Nebraska–Omaha (7–1–0) (1)	Miami (6–3–3)	New Hampshire (6–2–3)	Miami (9–4–3)	Miami (10–5–3)	Miami (10–5–3)	Denver (13–5–4)	Denver (13–5–4)	Michigan (15–6–4) (1)	Michigan (17–6–4)	New Hampshire (15–5–4)	New Hampshire (17–5–4) (1)	Merrimack (19–5–4)	Denver (19–8–5)	Michigan (23–9–4)	Denver (21–10–5)	Miami (21–9–6)	Michigan (26–10–4)	Yale (28–7–1)	6.
7.	Maine	Minnesota–Duluth (1–0–1)	New Hampshire (1–1–1)	Maine (3–1–2)	Maine (4–1–2)	Boston College (5–3–0)	New Hampshire (5–1–3)	Boston College (8–4–0)	North Dakota (9–5–2)	Boston University (7–3–5)	Denver (12–5–3)	Miami (11–6–3)	Michigan (13–6–4)	New Hampshire (12–4–4)	New Hampshire (13–5–4)	Wisconsin (19–8–3)	Wisconsin (19–8–3)	Union (22–7–3)	Minnesota–Duluth (19–7–5)	New Hampshire (19–7–6)	Miami (19–9–6)	Merrimack (24–8–4)	Merrimack (25–9–4)	Denver (25–12–5)	7.
8.	Minnesota–Duluth	Maine (1–0–1)	Boston University (2–0–1)	North Dakota (3–2–1)	Nebraska–Omaha (5–1–0)	Michigan (5–2–3)	North Dakota (7–4–1)	Michigan (8–3–3)	Boston College (9–5–0)	Maine (7–3–4)	Nebraska–Omaha (11–4–1)	Michigan (12–5–4)	Notre Dame (14–7–3)	Notre Dame (15–8–3)	Wisconsin (17–8–3)	Michigan (17–7–4)	Rensselaer (18–6–4)	New Hampshire (17–7–4)	Notre Dame (20–9–5)	Miami (19–9–6)	Notre Dame (21–10–5)	Notre Dame (23–11–5)	Union (26–9–4)	Miami (23–10–6)	8.
9.	Denver	New Hampshire (1–1–0)	Alaska (3–1–0)	Nebraska–Omaha (5–1–0)	North Dakota (4–3–1)	New Hampshire (4–1–2)	Michigan (6–3–3)	North Dakota (8–5–1)	Maine (6–3–3)	Denver (11–5–2)	Maine (8–4–4)	Maine (9–5–4)	Wisconsin (14–7–3)	Wisconsin (15–8–3)	Notre Dame (16–9–3)	Rensselaer (17–6–3)	Union (20–7–3)	Notre Dame (18–9–5)	New Hampshire (18–7–5)	Merrimack (21–7–4)	Merrimack (22–8–4)	Union (26–9–4)	Notre Dame (23–13–5)	New Hampshire (22–11–6)	9.
10.	New Hampshire	Boston University (2–0–0)	Nebraska–Omaha (4–0–0)	New Hampshire (1–1–2)	New Hampshire (2–1–2)	North Dakota (5–4–1)	Boston College (6–4–0)	Maine (6–3–3)	Denver (10–4–2)	Nebraska–Omaha (9–4–1)	Boston University (8–4–5)	Rensselaer (11–4–3)	Rensselaer (12–5–3)	Maine (11–6–4)	Rensselaer (15–6–3)	Notre Dame (16–9–5)	Notre Dame (16–9–5)	Miami (17–9–6)	Michigan (21–9–4)	Notre Dame (21–10–5)	New Hampshire (19–9–6)	New Hampshire (21–9–6)	Western Michigan (19–12–10)	Merrimack (25–10–4)	10.
11.	Cornell	St. Cloud State (1–1–0)	Denver (1–2–1)	Michigan State (2–0–2)	Notre Dame (5–1–1)	Notre Dame (6–2–1)	Notre Dame (7–3–1)	Notre Dame (9–3–1)	Michigan (8–4–4)	Notre Dame (10–5–2)	Michigan (10–5–4)	Notre Dame (12–7–3)	Nebraska–Omaha (12–7–1)	Miami (13–8–3)	Miami (14–9–3)	Union (18–7–3)	Merrimack (17–5–4)	Michigan (19–9–4)	Miami (17–9–6)	Minnesota–Duluth (19–8–6)	Minnesota–Duluth (20–8–6)	Minnesota–Duluth (22–9–6)	Minnesota–Duluth (22–10–6)	Colorado College (23–19–3)	11.
12.	Alaska	Cornell (0–0–0)	Maine (1–1–2)	Denver (2–2–2)	Michigan State (3–0–3)	Union (6–1–3)	Alaska (7–4–1)	Denver (8–4–2)	Notre Dame (9–4–2)	Michigan (9–5–4)	Notre Dame (11–6–2)	Nebraska–Omaha (12–7–1)	Miami (11–8–3)	Union (15–6–3)	Maine (11–6–5)	Merrimack (15–5–4)	Miami (16–9–5)	Wisconsin (19–10–3)	Nebraska–Omaha (19–11–2)	Nebraska–Omaha (20–12–2)	Nebraska–Omaha (21–13–2)	Western Michigan (18–11–10)	New Hampshire (21–10–6)	Union (26–10–4)	12.
13.	Wisconsin	Minnesota (2–0–0)	Cornell (0–0–0)	Notre Dame (4–1–0)	Denver (3–3–2)	Wisconsin (6–2–2)	Denver (6–4–2)	Union (7–2–3)	Union (7–2–3)	Union (8–3–3)	Union (10–3–3)	Wisconsin (12–7–3)	Maine (9–6–4)	Merrimack (12–4–4)	Union (16–7–3)	Miami (14–9–5)	Michigan (17–9–4)	Nebraska–Omaha (18–10–2)	Wisconsin (19–11–4)	Boston University (17–9–8)	Boston University (18–10–8)	Colorado College (21–17–3)	Colorado College (22–18–3)	Western Michigan (19–13–10)	13.
14.	Boston University	Alaska (1–1–0)	St. Cloud State (1–2–1)	Cornell (0–0–0)	Alaska (5–2–1)	Alaska (6–3–1)	Union (7–2–3)	Alaska (7–5–2)	Alaska (8–5–3)	Alaska (8–5–3)	Rensselaer (9–4–3)	Boston University (8–5–6)	Union (13–6–3)	Rensselaer (13–6–3)	Merrimack (13–5–4)	Boston University (12–7–7)	Boston University (13–7–7)	Rensselaer (18–8–4)	Rensselaer (19–9–4)	Maine (16–10–6)	Maine (17–10–7)	Nebraska–Omaha (21–15–2)	Nebraska–Omaha (21–15–2)	Nebraska–Omaha (21–16–2)	14.
15.	Minnesota	Wisconsin (1–1–0)	Wisconsin (3–1–0)	Alaska (3–2–1)	Union (5–1–2) т	Denver (4–4–2)	Wisconsin (6–4–2)	Minnesota (7–4–1)	Wisconsin (7–6–3)	Rensselaer (8–4–3)	Wisconsin (10–7–3)	Union (11–6–3)	Merrimack (10–4–4)	Boston University (10–5–6)	Nebraska–Omaha (13–9–2)	Maine (11–7–6)	Western Michigan (15–6–9)	Boston University (14–8–7)	Boston University (16–8–7)	Western Michigan (16–10–10)	Western Michigan (16–10–10)	Dartmouth (18–11–3)	Dartmouth (19–12–3)	Dartmouth (19–12–3)	15.
16.	Michigan State	Union (2–0–0)	Michigan State (1–0–1)	Union (5–1–0)	Wisconsin (5–2–1) т	Michigan State (3–2–3)	Western Michigan (6–2–2)	Wisconsin (6–6–2)	Rensselaer (7–3–3)	Wisconsin (8–7–3)	Alaska (9–6–3)	Alaska (9–6–3)	Boston University (9–5–6)	Nebraska–Omaha (12–8–2)	Boston University (11–7–6)	Western Michigan (14–6–8)	Nebraska–Omaha (16–10–2)	Dartmouth (15–7–3)	Maine (14–10–6)	Rensselaer (19–10–5)	Colorado College (19–16–3)	Boston University (19–12–8)	Rensselaer (20–12–5)	Rensselaer (20–12–5)	16.
17.	Notre Dame	Nebraska–Omaha (2–0–0)	Notre Dame (3–1–0)	St. Cloud State (2–3–1)	Minnesota (5–3–0)	Western Michigan (6–2–2)	Michigan State (4–3–3)	Rensselaer (5–3–3)	Minnesota (8–5–1)	Merrimack (7–4–4)	Merrimack (7–4–4)	Merrimack (9–4–4)	Colorado College (12–9–1)	Western Michigan (12–6–6)	Western Michigan (12–6–8)	Dartmouth (12–6–3)	Dartmouth (13–7–3)	Western Michigan (15–7–10)	Western Michigan (15–9–10)	Colorado College (18–15–3)	Minnesota (16–12–6)	Maine (17–12–7)	Boston University (19–12–8)	Boston University (19–12–8)	17.
18.	RIT	Colorado College (1–0–1)	Union (3–1–0)	Wisconsin (3–2–1)	Rensselaer (3–1–3)	Rensselaer (4–2–3)	Rensselaer (5–3–3)	Merrimack (4–2–4)	Merrimack (5–3–4)	Ferris State (8–6–3)	Ferris State (9–7–3)	Colorado College (12–9–1)	Western Michigan (11–6–5)	Dartmouth (10–5–2)	Dartmouth (11–6–2)	Nebraska–Omaha (14–10–2)	Maine (11–9–6)	Colorado College (17–14–1)	Dartmouth (15–9–3)	Wisconsin (19–13–4)	Dartmouth (16–10–3)	Rensselaer (20–12–5)	Maine (17–12–7)	Air Force (20–12–6)	18.
19.	Union	Notre Dame (1–1–0)	Colorado College (2–1–1)	Colorado College (3–2–1)	Cornell (0–2–0)	Minnesota (5–4–1)	Minnesota (5–4–1)	Western Michigan (6–3–3)	Western Michigan (7–4–3)	Dartmouth (6–3–1)	Minnesota (9–7–2)	Princeton (10–5–0)	Ferris State (11–8–4)	Alaska (10–8–4)	Princeton (11–6–1)	Princeton (14–6–1)	Colorado College (16–13–1)	Maine (12–10–6)	Colorado College (17–15–2)	Minnesota (15–12–5)	Wisconsin (20–14–4)	Wisconsin (21–16–4)	Cornell (16–15–3)	Maine (17–12–7)	19.
20.	Colorado College	Michigan State (0–0–0)	Minnesota (2–2–0)	Minnesota (3–3–0) т Rensselaer (3–1–2) т	St. Cloud State (3–4–1)	Ferris State (5–3–2)	Robert Morris (7–2–1)	Ferris State (6–5–3)	Ferris State (7–5–3)	Western Michigan (7–5–4)	Colorado College (10–7–1)	Ferris State (9–8–4)	Alaska (9–7–4)	Princeton (11–6–1)	Colorado College (14–11–1)	Colorado College (15–12–1)	Princeton (14–8–1)	Ferris State (16–12–4)	Minnesota (13–12–5)	Dartmouth (16–10–3)	Rensselaer (20–12–5)	Cornell (15–14–3)	Air Force (20–11–6)	Cornell (16–15–3)	20.
	Preseason Oct 4	Week 1 Oct 11	Week 2 Oct 18	Week 3 Oct 25	Week 4 Nov 1	Week 5 Nov 8	Week 6 Nov 15	Week 7 Nov 22	Week 8 Nov 29	Week 9 Dec 6	Week 10 Dec 13	Week 12 Jan 3	Week 13 Jan 10	Week 14 Jan 17	Week 15 Jan 25	Week 16 Jan 31	Week 17 Feb 7	Week 18 Feb 14	Week 19 Feb 21	Week 20 Feb 28	Week 21 Mar 7	Week 22 Mar 14	Week 23 Mar 21	Final Apr 11	
		Dropped: RIT	None	None	Dropped: Colorado College	Dropped: Cornell; St. Cloud State	Dropped: Ferris State	Dropped: Michigan State; Robert Morris	None	Dropped: Minnesota	Dropped: Dartmouth; Western Michigan	Dropped: Minnesota	Dropped: Princeton	Dropped: Colorado College; Ferris State	Dropped: Alaska	None	None	Dropped: Princeton	Dropped: Ferris State	None	None	Dropped: Minnesota	Dropped: Wisconsin	None	

== USA Today/USA Hockey Magazine ==
	Preseason Sep 27	Week 1 Oct 11	Week 2 Oct 18	Week 3 Oct 25	Week 4 Nov 1	Week 5 Nov 8	Week 6 Nov 15	Week 7 Nov 22	Week 8 Nov 29	Week 9 Dec 6	Week 10 Dec 13	Week 11 Dec 20	Week 12 Jan 3	Week 13 Jan 10	Week 14 Jan 17	Week 15 Jan 24	Week 16 Jan 31	Week 17 Feb 7	Week 18 Feb 14	Week 19 Feb 21	Week 20 Feb 28	Week 21 Mar 7	Week 22 Mar 14	Week 23 Mar 21	Week 24 Mar 28	Final Apr 11	
1.	Boston College (28)	Boston College (1–0–0) (31)	Boston College (3–0–0) (34)	Miami (4–1–1) (18)	Miami (5–1–2) (23)	Boston University (6–0–2) (23)	Minnesota–Duluth (9–1–2) (27)	Minnesota–Duluth (11–1–2) (34)	Minnesota–Duluth (11–1–2) (34)	Yale (10–1–0) (24)	Yale (11–1–0) (34)	Yale (11–1–0) (34)	Yale (12–1–0) (34)	Yale (14–1–0) (33)	Yale (15–2–0) (26)	Yale (17–2–0) (34)	Boston College (18–6–0) (26)	Boston College (19–6–0) (32)	Boston College (21–6–0) (34)	North Dakota (22–8–3) (18)	North Dakota (24–8–3) (30)	North Dakota (26–8–3) (29)	North Dakota (28–8–3) (29)	North Dakota (30–8–3) (27)	North Dakota (32–8–3) (34)	Minnesota–Duluth (26–10–6) (34)	1.
2.	North Dakota (4)	North Dakota (1–0–1) (3)	North Dakota (3–0–1) (1)	Boston College (3–1–0) (14)	Minnesota–Duluth (6–0–2) (7)	Minnesota–Duluth (7–1–2) (5)	Boston University (6–0–4) (6)	Boston University (7–1–4)	Yale (8–1–0)	Minnesota–Duluth (12–2–2) (9)	New Hampshire (10–2–4)	New Hampshire (10–2–4)	North Dakota (14–5–2)	North Dakota (16–5–2) (1)	North Dakota (17–6–2) (8)	Boston College (17–6–0)	Yale (17–4–0) (3)	Yale (19–4–0) (1)	North Dakota (21–8–2)	Boston College (22–7–1) (7)	Boston College (24–7–1) (4)	Boston College (26–7–1) (5)	Boston College (28–7–1) (5)	Boston College (30–7–1) (6)	Michigan (28–10–4)	Michigan (29–11–4)	2.
3.	Miami (2)	Michigan (2–0–1)	Michigan (2–0–2)	Minnesota–Duluth (5–0–1) (1)	Boston University (6–0–1) (4)	Miami (5–2–3) (3)	Maine (6–1–3)	Yale (7–1–0)	Boston University (7–1–5)	New Hampshire (9–2–4)	Minnesota–Duluth (12–3–3)	Minnesota–Duluth (12–3–3)	Boston College (13–5–0)	Boston College (15–5–0)	Boston College (15–6–0)	Denver (16–5–5)	Denver (16–5–5) (2)	Minnesota–Duluth (18–5–4) (1)	Yale (20–5–0)	Yale (22–5–0) (9)	Yale (23–5–1)	Yale (23–5–1)	Yale (25–6–1)	Yale (27–6–1) (1)	Minnesota–Duluth (24–10–6)	North Dakota (32–9–3)	3.
4.	Michigan	Miami (1–1–0)	Miami (2–1–1)	Michigan (3–1–2)	Boston College (4–2–0)	Yale (4–0–0) (2)	Nebraska–Omaha (8–1–1) (1)	Nebraska–Omaha (9–2–1)	Nebraska–Omaha (9–2–1)	Boston College (11–5–0) (1)	Boston College (11–5–0)	Boston College (11–5–0)	New Hampshire (10–3–4)	New Hampshire (12–3–4)	Denver (14–5–5)	Minnesota–Duluth (17–5–3)	Minnesota–Duluth (17–5–3) (3)	Denver (17–6–5)	Denver (18–7–5)	Merrimack (21–5–4)	Union (25–7–4)	Union (25–7–4)	Michigan (25–9–4)	Miami (23–9–6)	Notre Dame (25–13–5)	Notre Dame (25–14–5)	4.
5.	Yale	Yale (0–0–0)	Minnesota–Duluth (3–0–1)	Boston University (4–0–1) (1)	Michigan (4–1–3)	Maine (4–1–3)	Yale (5–1–0)	Miami (8–3–3)	New Hampshire (7–2–4)	North Dakota (11–5–2)	North Dakota (13–5–2)	North Dakota (13–5–2)	Minnesota–Duluth (12–4–3)	Minnesota–Duluth (14–4–3)	Minnesota–Duluth (15–5–3)	North Dakota (18–7–2)	North Dakota (19–8–2)	North Dakota (19–8–2)	Merrimack (19–5–4)	Union (24–7–3)	Michigan (23–9–4)	Michigan (23–9–4)	Denver (23–10–5)	Denver (24–11–5)	Boston College (30–8–1)	Boston College (30–8–1)	5.
6.	St. Cloud State	Maine (1–0–1)	Yale (0–0–0)	Maine (3–1–2)	Yale (2–0–0)	Boston College (5–3–0) (1)	Miami (6–3–3)	New Hampshire (6–2–3)	Miami (9–4–3)	Maine (7–3–4)	Miami (10–5–3)	Miami (10–5–3)	Denver (13–5–4)	Denver (13–5–4)	Michigan (15–6–4) (1)	Michigan (17–6–4)	New Hampshire (15–5–4)	New Hampshire (17–5–4)	Minnesota–Duluth (18–6–5)	Denver (19–8–5)	Denver (20–9–5)	Denver (21–10–5)	Miami (21–9–6)	Michigan (26–10–4)	Yale (28–7–1)	Yale (28–7–1)	6.
7.	Maine	Minnesota–Duluth (1–0–1)	New Hampshire (1–1–1)	Yale (0–0–0)	Maine (4–1–2)	Nebraska–Omaha (7–1–0)	North Dakota (7–4–1)	Boston College (8–4–0)	North Dakota (9–5–2)	Boston University (7–3–5)	Denver (12–5–3)	Denver (12–5–3)	Michigan (12–5–4)	Michigan (13–6–4)	New Hampshire (12–4–4)	Wisconsin (17–8–3)	Wisconsin (19–8–3)	Wisconsin (19–8–3)	Union (22–7–3)	Minnesota–Duluth (19–7–5)	Merrimack (21–7–4)	Miami (19–9–6)	Merrimack (24–8–4)	Merrimack (25–9–4)	Denver (25–12–5)	Denver (25–12–5)	7.
8.	New Hampshire	Denver (1–0–1)	Boston University (2–0–1)	North Dakota (3–2–1)	Nebraska–Omaha (5–1–0)	New Hampshire (4–1–2)	New Hampshire (5–1–3)	Michigan (8–3–3)	Boston College (9–5–0)	Miami (10–5–3)	Nebraska–Omaha (11–4–1)	Maine (8–4–4)	Miami (11–6–3)	Notre Dame (14–7–3)	Notre Dame (15–8–3)	New Hampshire (13–5–4)	Rensselaer (17–6–3)	Rensselaer (18–6–4)	Notre Dame (18–9–5)	Notre Dame (20–9–5)	New Hampshire (19–7–6)	Notre Dame (21–10–5)	Union (26–9–4) т	Union (26–9–4)	Miami (23–10–6)	Miami (23–10–6)	8.
9.	Minnesota–Duluth	New Hampshire (1–1–0)	Alaska (3–1–0)	Nebraska–Omaha (5–1–0)	North Dakota (4–3–1)	Michigan (5–2–3)	Boston College (6–4–0)	Maine (6–3–3)	Maine (6–3–3)	Nebraska–Omaha (9–4–1)	Maine (8–4–4)	Nebraska–Omaha (12–5–1)	Rensselaer (11–4–3)	Rensselaer (12–5–3)	Wisconsin (15–8–3)	Notre Dame (16–9–3)	Michigan (17–7–4)	Union (20–7–3)	New Hampshire (17–7–4)	New Hampshire (18–7–5)	Notre Dame (21–10–5)	Merrimack (22–8–4)	Notre Dame (23–11–5) т	Notre Dame (23–13–5)	New Hampshire (22–11–6)	New Hampshire (22–11–6)	9.
10.	Cornell	Boston University (2–0–0) т	Nebraska–Omaha (4–0–0)	New Hampshire (1–1–2)	New Hampshire (2–1–2)	North Dakota (5–4–1)	Michigan (6–3–3)	North Dakota (8–5–1)	Denver (10–4–2)	Denver (11–5–2)	Union (10–3–3)	Michigan (10–5–4)	Nebraska–Omaha (12–7–1)	Nebraska–Omaha (12–7–1)	Union (15–6–3)	Rensselaer (15–6–3)	Notre Dame (16–9–5)	Notre Dame (16–9–5)	Miami (17–9–6)	Michigan (21–9–4)	Miami (19–9–6)	New Hampshire (19–9–6)	New Hampshire (21–9–6)	Western Michigan (19–12–10)	Merrimack (25–10–4)	Merrimack (25–10–4)	10.
11.	Denver	St. Cloud State (1–1–0) т	Maine (1–1–2)	Notre Dame (4–1–0)	Notre Dame (5–1–1)	Notre Dame (6–2–1)	Notre Dame (7–3–1)	Notre Dame (9–3–1)	Michigan (8–4–4)	Notre Dame (10–5–2)	Michigan (10–5–4)	Boston University (8–4–5)	Maine (9–5–4)	Wisconsin (14–7–3)	Maine (11–6–4)	Maine (11–6–5)	Union (18–7–3)	Merrimack (17–5–4)	Michigan (19–9–4)	Miami (17–9–6)	Minnesota–Duluth (19–8–6)	Minnesota–Duluth (20–8–6)	Minnesota–Duluth (22–9–6)	New Hampshire (21–10–6)	Colorado College (23–19–3)	Colorado College (23–19–3)	11.
12.	Alaska	Cornell (0–0–0)	Cornell (0–0–0)	Denver (2–2–2)	Michigan State (3–0–3)	Union (6–1–3)	Union (7–2–3)	Union (7–2–3)	Notre Dame (9–4–2)	Michigan (9–5–4)	Boston University (8–4–5)	Notre Dame (11–6–2)	Notre Dame (12–7–3)	Miami (11–8–3)	Miami (13–8–3)	Union (16–7–3)	Merrimack (15–5–4)	Miami (16–9–5)	Nebraska–Omaha (18–10–2)	Nebraska–Omaha (19–11–2)	Nebraska–Omaha (20–12–2)	Nebraska–Omaha (21–13–2)	Western Michigan (18–11–10)	Minnesota–Duluth (22–10–6)	Union (26–10–4)	Union (26–10–4)	12.
13.	Wisconsin	Minnesota (2–0–0)	Denver (1–2–1)	Union (5–1–0)	Denver (3–3–2)	Alaska (6–3–1)	Alaska (7–4–1)	Denver (8–4–2)	Union (7–2–3)	Union (8–3–3)	Notre Dame (11–6–2)	Rensselaer (10–5–3)	Wisconsin (12–7–3)	Union (13–6–3)	Rensselaer (13–6–3)	Miami (14–9–3)	Miami (14–9–5)	Michigan (17–9–4)	Wisconsin (19–10–3)	Rensselaer (19–9–4)	Boston University (17–9–8)	Boston University (18–10–8)	Colorado College (21–17–3)	Colorado College (22–18–3)	Western Michigan (19–13–10)	Western Michigan (19–13–10)	13.
14.	Boston University	Alaska (1–1–0)	Wisconsin (3–1–0)	Michigan State (2–0–2)	Union (5–1–2)	Wisconsin (6–2–2)	Denver (6–4–2)	Alaska (7–5–2)	Alaska (8–5–3)	Alaska (8–5–3)	Rensselaer (9–4–3)	Union (10–5–3)	Union (11–6–3)	Maine (9–6–4)	Merrimack (12–4–4)	Merrimack (13–5–4)	Boston University (12–7–7)	Boston University (13–7–7)	Rensselaer (18–8–4)	Wisconsin (19–11–4)	Maine (16–10–6)	Maine (17–10–7)	Nebraska–Omaha (21–15–2)	Nebraska–Omaha (21–15–2)	Nebraska–Omaha (21–16–2)	Nebraska–Omaha (21–16–2)	14.
15.	Minnesota	Wisconsin (1–1–0)	St. Cloud State (1–2–1)	Cornell (0–0–0)	Alaska (5–2–1)	Denver (4–4–2)	Wisconsin (6–4–2)	Minnesota (7–4–1)	Rensselaer (7–3–3)	Rensselaer (8–4–3)	Wisconsin (10–7–3)	Wisconsin (10–7–3)	Boston University (8–5–6)	Merrimack (10–4–4)	Nebraska–Omaha (12–8–2)	Nebraska–Omaha (13–9–2)	Maine (11–7–6)	Western Michigan (15–6–9)	Boston University (14–8–7)	Boston University (16–8–7)	Rensselaer (19–10–5)	Western Michigan (16–10–10)	Dartmouth (18–11–3)	Rensselaer (20–12–5)	Rensselaer (20–13–5)	Rensselaer (20–13–5)	15.
	Preseason Sep 27	Week 1 Oct 11	Week 2 Oct 18	Week 3 Oct 25	Week 4 Nov 1	Week 5 Nov 8	Week 6 Nov 15	Week 7 Nov 22	Week 8 Nov 29	Week 9 Dec 6	Week 10 Dec 13	Week 11 Dec 20	Week 12 Jan 3	Week 13 Jan 10	Week 14 Jan 17	Week 15 Jan 24	Week 16 Jan 31	Week 17 Feb 7	Week 18 Feb 14	Week 19 Feb 21	Week 20 Feb 28	Week 21 Mar 7	Week 22 Mar 14	Week 23 Mar 21	Week 24 Mar 28	Final Apr 11	
		None	Dropped: Minnesota	Dropped: Alaska; St. Cloud State; Wisconsin	Dropped: Cornell	Dropped: Michigan State	None	Dropped: Wisconsin	Dropped: Minnesota	None	Dropped: Alaska	None	None	Dropped: Boston University	None	None	Dropped: Nebraska–Omaha	Dropped: Maine	Dropped: Western Michigan	None	Dropped: Wisconsin	Dropped: Rensselaer	Dropped: Boston University; Maine	Dropped: Dartmouth	None	None	
