= Jack Connolly (ice hockey, born 1989) =

American professional ice hockey center

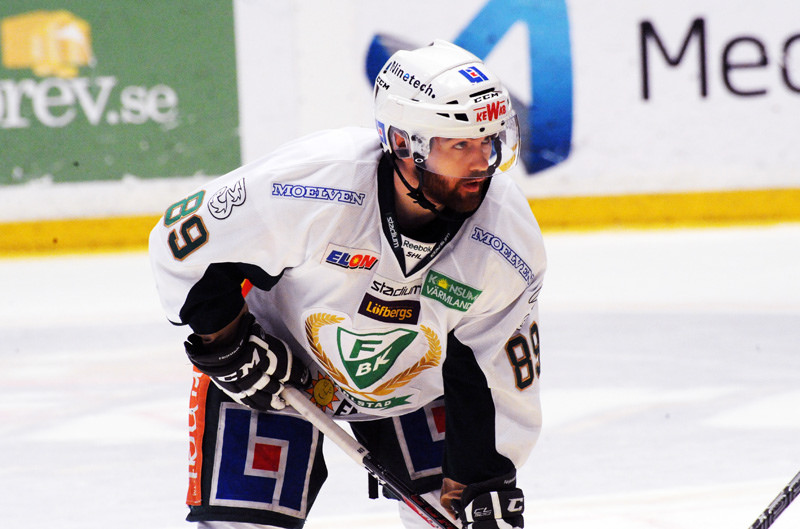
- Connolly playing for Färjestad BK in 2014
- Born: August 15, 1989 (age 36) Duluth, Minnesota, U.S.
- Height: 5 ft 8 in (173 cm)
- Weight: 170 lb (77 kg; 12 st 2 lb)
- Position: Center
- Shot: Left
- Played for: Färjestad BK; Leksands IF; Rögle BK; Luleå HF
- NHL draft: Undrafted
- Playing career: 2012–2024

Jack Connolly (born August 15, 1989) is an American former professional ice hockey center who played twelve seasons in the Swedish Hockey League (SHL). He played college hockey for the Minnesota-Duluth Bulldogs.

== Playing career ==
Connolly played his high school hockey at the Marshall School, in Duluth, Minnesota before playing junior hockey in the United States Hockey League with the Sioux Falls Stampede during the 2007–08 season. He began playing for the Minnesota-Duluth Bulldogs in the 2008 season. He helped UMD to their first ever NCAA Men's Hockey Championship in 2011. As a senior in 2011–12, he finished the regular season ranked second in the nation in scoring and 8th on the Minnesota-Duluth career points with 197 points. Connolly played in every Minnesota-Duluth hockey game during his four years, equalling a total of 166 games. Connolly was named All-American three times and on April 6, 2012, he won the 2012 Hobey Baker Award.

Undrafted, Connolly, like his brother, opted to pursue a professional career abroad and signed to play the 2012–13 season, with Swedish team Färjestad BK in Elitserien.

After two seasons, Connolly left as a free agent to sign with fellow SHL club, Leksands IF on April 23, 2014. His older brother Chris was also a teammate. In the 2014–15 season, Connolly left Leksands after 8 scoreless games to join HockeyAllsvenskan club, Rögle BK on October 9, 2014. Connolly adapted quickly to produce 30 points in 40 games to help Rögle BK gain promotion to return to the SHL.

He ended his career with Luleå HF, with whom he played six seasons.

== Personal life ==
Connolly has been married to Malaree Stauber since 2014. His father-in-law is Jamie Stauber, a member of a well-known hockey playing family from Duluth, Minnesota.

== Career statistics ==
| | | | Regular season | | | | | Playoffs |
| Season | Team | League | GP | G | A | Pts | PIM | GP | G | A | Pts | PIM |
|---|---|---|---|---|---|---|---|---|---|---|---|---|
| 2006–07 | Marshall School | USHS | 31 | 37 | 40 | 77 | 26 | — | — | — | — | — |
| 2007–08 | Sioux Falls Stampede | USHL | 58 | 26 | 46 | 72 | 30 | 3 | 0 | 3 | 3 | 0 |
| 2008–09 | University of Minnesota Duluth | WCHA | 43 | 10 | 19 | 29 | 47 | — | — | — | — | — |
| 2009–10 | University of Minnesota Duluth | WCHA | 40 | 18 | 31 | 49 | 47 | — | — | — | — | — |
| 2010–11 | University of Minnesota Duluth | WCHA | 42 | 18 | 41 | 59 | 34 | — | — | — | — | — |
| 2011–12 | University of Minnesota Duluth | WCHA | 41 | 20 | 40 | 60 | 28 | — | — | — | — | — |
| 2012–13 | Färjestad BK | SEL | 34 | 8 | 11 | 19 | 16 | 10 | 0 | 5 | 5 | 4 |
| 2013–14 | Färjestad BK | SHL | 55 | 11 | 12 | 23 | 45 | 14 | 1 | 2 | 3 | 2 |
| 2014–15 | Leksands IF | SHL | 8 | 0 | 0 | 0 | 2 | — | — | — | — | — |
| 2014–15 | Rögle BK | Allsv | 40 | 6 | 24 | 30 | 8 | 10 | 1 | 5 | 6 | 2 |
| 2015–16 | Rögle BK | SHL | 50 | 9 | 28 | 37 | 14 | — | — | — | — | — |
| 2016–17 | Rögle BK | SHL | 52 | 4 | 24 | 28 | 16 | — | — | — | — | — |
| 2017–18 | Rögle BK | SHL | 52 | 5 | 14 | 19 | 6 | — | — | — | — | — |
| 2018–19 | Luleå HF | SHL | 52 | 16 | 19 | 35 | 26 | 10 | 1 | 5 | 6 | 2 |
| 2019–20 | Luleå HF | SHL | 52 | 5 | 19 | 24 | — | — | — | — | — |
| 2020–21 | Luleå HF | SHL | 52 | 10 | 20 | 30 | 16 | 7 | 0 | 3 | 3 | 2 |
| 2021–22 | Luleå HF | SHL | 35 | 10 | 7 | 17 | 16 | 17 | 4 | 5 | 9 | 4 |
| 2022–23 | Luleå HF | SHL | 51 | 5 | 21 | 26 | 14 | 10 | 1 | 1 | 2 | 4 |
| 2023–24 | Luleå HF | SHL | 52 | 2 | 14 | 16 | 8 | 7 | 2 | 1 | 3 | 8 |
| SHL totals | | | 545 | 85 | 189 | 274 | 203 | 75 | 9 | 22 | 33 | 26 |

== Awards and honors ==
Medal record

Ice hockey

Representing United States

World Junior A Challenge
| Bronze medal – third place | 2007 Trail | |

| Award | Year |
|---|---|
| USHL Dave Tyler Junior Player of the Year Award | 2007–08 |
| All-WCHA First Team | 2009–10 |
| AHCA West Second-Team All-American | 2009–10 |
| All-WCHA First Team | 2010–11 |
| AHCA West First-Team All-American | 2010–11 |
| All-WCHA First Team | 2011–12 |
| AHCA West First-Team All-American | 2011–12 |
| Hobey Baker Award | 2011–12 |
| Premier Player of College Hockey | 2011–12 |

Awards and achievements
| Preceded by Matt Frattin | WCHA Player of the Year; 2011–12 | Succeeded by Drew LeBlanc |
| Preceded by Andy Miele | Winner of the Hobey Baker Award; 2011–12 | Succeeded by Drew LeBlanc |
