= 2011–12 Alabama–Huntsville Chargers men's ice hockey season =

American college ice hockey team season

2011–12 Alabama–Huntsville Chargers men's ice hockey
- Conference: Independent
- Record: 2–28–1
- Head coach: Chris Luongo (2nd season)
- Assistant coaches: Gavin Morgan; Tim Flynn
- Captain: Curtis deBruyn
- Alternate captain: Jamie Easton, Sebastian Geoffrion, Tom Durnie
- Home stadium: Propst Arena

The 2011–12 Alabama–Huntsville Chargers ice hockey team represented the University of Alabama in Huntsville in the 2011–12 NCAA Division I men's ice hockey season. The Chargers were coached by Chris Luongo who was in his second season as head coach. His assistant coaches were Gavin Morgan and Tim Flynn. The Chargers played their home games in the Propst Arena at the Von Braun Center and competed as an independent.

On October 24, 2011, interim UAH President Malcolm Portera announced that the 2011–12 season would be the school's final season competing at the NCAA Division I level, citing financial reasons. The program would be "realigned" as a club team, and the coaches' jobs would be eliminated as of May 31, 2012. New UAH president Dr. Robert Altenkirch reversed the decision after he and school administrators met with local supporters on December 6, 2011. UAH continued to play at the NCAA Division I level for the 2012–13 season. The school set up a campaign to raise funds for the program, with the goal of getting the Chargers into a conference.

== Recruiting ==
UAH added 9 freshmen for the 2011–12 season, including 7 forwards and 2 defensemen:

Player	Position	Nationality	Notes
Andrew Creppin	Forward	Canada	Orleans, Ontario; all-time leading scorer in Gloucester Rangers history, 2010–11 CCHL First-Team All-Star
Tyler Kotlarz	Forward	United States	Hudsonville, Michigan
Kyle Lysaght	Forward	United States	Marietta, Georgia
Craig Pierce	Forward	United States	Roswell, Georgia; ex-Rochester Stars captain
Doug Reid	Forward	Canada	Innisfil, Ontario; ex-Markham Waxers captain
Ben Reinhardt	Defenseman	Canada	Arnprior, Ontario; ex-Pembroke Lumber Kings captain, won 5 consecutive CCHL championships and 2010–11 RBC Cup, 2010–11 First-Team All-Star, voted CCHL's 2009–10 Best Defenseman
Graeme Strukoff	Defenseman	Canada	Chilliwack, British Columbia
Jeff Vanderlugt	Forward	Canada	Richmond Hill, Ontario
Michael Webley	Forward	Canada	Stittsville, Ontario; CCHL Sportsmanship and Ability Award winner for 2010–11

== Roster ==
=== Departures from 2010–11 team ===
- Matt Baxter, D – Graduation
- Vince Bruni, F – Graduation
- Ryan Burkholder, D – Graduation
- Trevor Conrad, D
- Keenan Desmet, F — FFHG Division 2 (Evry)
- Cody Dion, F — Suomi-sarja (S-Kiekko)
- Chris Fairbanks, F – Graduation
- Joe Koudys, F – Graduation
- Neil Ruffini, F – Graduation
- David Ruffini, F – Graduation
- David Way, F

=== 2011–12 team ===
As of February 11, 2012

No.	Nat.	Player	Class	Pos	Height	Weight	DoB	Hometown	Previous team
2		Graeme Strukoff	Freshman	D	6' 1" (1.85 m)	190 lb (86 kg)	1991-03-30	Chilliwack, British Columbia	Victoria (BCHL)
5		Brice Geoffrion	Sophomore	F	6' 1" (1.85 m)	195 lb (88 kg)	1990-11-04	Brentwood, Tennessee	Motor City (NAHL)
7		Jamie Easton (A)	Senior	F	5' 8" (1.73 m)	165 lb (75 kg)	1988-01-05	Edmonton, Alberta	Bonnyville (AJHL)
8		Alex Allan	Sophomore	F	6' 1" (1.85 m)	185 lb (84 kg)	1989-08-28	Calgary, Alberta	Victoria (BCHL)
10		Mat Hagen	Sophomore	D	5' 10" (1.78 m)	185 lb (84 kg)	1989-12-27	Ottawa, Ontario	Kanata (CJHL)
12		Mac Roy	Sophomore	F	5' 11" (1.8 m)	175 lb (79 kg)	1989-04-20	Chilliwack, British Columbia	Langley (BCHL)
13		Michael Webley	Freshman	F	6' 1" (1.85 m)	190 lb (86 kg)	1990-10-13	Stittsville, Ontario	Gloucester (CCHL)
14		Nickolas Gatt	Sophomore	D	6' 3" (1.91 m)	195 lb (88 kg)	1990-12-20	Farmington Hills, Michigan	Topeka (NAHL)
15		Tyler Kotlarz	Freshman	F	6' 1" (1.85 m)	190 lb (86 kg)	1990-11-03	Hudsonville, Michigan	Markham (OJHL)
16		Doug Reid	Freshman	F	6' 1" (1.85 m)	200 lb (91 kg)	1990-03-20	Innisfil, Ontario	Markham (OJHL)
18		Andrew Creppin	Freshman	F	6' 1" (1.85 m)	190 lb (86 kg)	1990-05-17	Orleans, Ontario	Gloucester (CCHL)
19		Craig Pierce	Freshman	F	5' 11" (1.8 m)	185 lb (84 kg)	1990-10-18	Roswell, Georgia	Rochester (EJHL)
20		Lasse Uusivirta	Sophomore	D	6' 1" (1.85 m)	170 lb (77 kg)	1989-07-27	Espoo, Finland	Blues U20 (Jr. A SM-liiga)
21		Jeff Vanderlugt	Freshman	F	6' 3" (1.91 m)	220 lb (100 kg)	1990-05-12	Richmond Hill, Ontario	Surrey (BCHL)
22		Sebastian Geoffrion (A)	Junior	F	5' 10" (1.78 m)	190 lb (86 kg)	1989-07-26	Brentwood, Tennessee	Indiana (USHL)
23		Curtis deBruyn (C)	Junior	D	5' 10" (1.78 m)	186 lb (84 kg)	1988-10-07	Calgary, Alberta	Olds (AJHL)
24		Tom Durnie (A)	Senior	D	6' 2" (1.88 m)	195 lb (88 kg)	1988-04-04	Calgary, Alberta	Canmore (AJHL)
26		Justin Cseter	Junior	F	5' 10" (1.78 m)	173 lb (78 kg)	1988-08-24	Menomonie, Wisconsin	Salmon Arm (BCHL)
27		Kyle Lysaght	Freshman	F	6' 1" (1.85 m)	190 lb (86 kg)	1990-08-23	Marietta, Georgia	Oakville (OJHL)
28		Ben Reinhardt	Freshman	D	5' 10" (1.78 m)	185 lb (84 kg)	1990-03-24	Arnprior, Ontario	Pembroke (CCHL)
31		John Griggs	Junior	G	6' 1" (1.85 m)	175 lb (79 kg)	1988-06-28	Barrington, Illinois	Cumberland (CJHL)
32		C. J. Groh	Sophomore	G	6' 2" (1.88 m)	185 lb (84 kg)	1990-04-16	Cincinnati, Ohio	Waterloo (USHL)
33		Clarke Saunders	Sophomore	G	6' 3" (1.91 m)	190 lb (86 kg)	1989-09-09	Brockville, Ontario	Brockville (CJHL)

== Regular season ==
=== Schedule ===
- Green background indicates win.
- Red background indicates loss.
- Yellow background indicates tie.

Date	Time	Opponent	Site	Decision	Result	Attendance	Record
October 1	7:00 pm	Lake Superior State*	Propst Arena • Huntsville, Alabama	Saunders	L 2–3	2,485	0–1–0
October 2	3:00 pm	Lake Superior State*	Propst Arena • Huntsville, Alabama	Griggs	L 1–2	1,060	0–2–0
October 7	6:05 pm	at #13 Western Michigan*	Lawson Ice Arena • Kalamazoo, Michigan	Griggs	L 1–7	3,229	0–3–0
October 8	6:05 pm	at #13 Western Michigan*	Lawson Ice Arena • Kalamazoo, Michigan	Saunders	L 0–4	2,689	0–4–0
October 14	7:00 pm	Bowling Green*	Propst Arena • Huntsville, Alabama	Saunders	L 1–2	1,486	0–5–0
October 15	7:00 pm	Bowling Green*	Propst Arena • Huntsville, Alabama	Saunders	L 0–3	1,358	0–6–0
October 21	7:00 pm	Air Force*	Propst Arena • Huntsville, Alabama	Saunders	T 1–1 ^{OT}	1,893	0–6–1
October 22	7:00 pm	Air Force*	Propst Arena • Huntsville, Alabama	Saunders	L 2–7	996	0–7–1
November 4	7:00 pm	Ohio State*	Propst Arena • Huntsville, Alabama	Saunders	L 0–4	2,519	0–8–1
November 5	7:00 pm	Ohio State*	Propst Arena • Huntsville, Alabama	Saunders	L 0–2	1,351	0–9–1
November 11	6:00 pm	at Providence*	Schneider Arena • Providence, Rhode Island	Saunders	L 0–3	1,371	0–10–1
November 12	6:00 pm	at Providence*	Schneider Arena • Providence, Rhode Island	Saunders	L 2–4	1,017	0–11–1
November 23	6:00 pm	at #1 Merrimack*	J. Thom Lawler Arena • North Andover, Massachusetts	Griggs	L 0–6	2,489	0–12–1
November 25	3:00 pm	at UMass Lowell*	Tsongas Center • Lowell, Massachusetts	Saunders	L 0–3	2,641	0–13–1
November 26	6:00 pm	at New Hampshire*	Whittemore Center • Durham, New Hampshire	Groh	L 1–9	4,378	0–14–1
December 2	7:00 pm	Nebraska–Omaha*	Bridgestone Arena • Nashville, Tennessee	Saunders	W 3–1	957	1–14–1
December 3	1:00 pm	Nebraska–Omaha*	Bridgestone Arena • Nashville, Tennessee	Saunders	L 2–6	1,364	1–15–1
December 9	7:35 pm	at Minnesota State*	Verizon Wireless Center • Mankato, Minnesota	Saunders	L 2–4	2,421	1–16–1
December 10	7:05 pm	at Minnesota State*	Verizon Wireless Center • Mankato, Minnesota	Saunders	L 1–9	2,472	1–17–1
December 16	7:35 pm	at Bemidji State*	Sanford Center • Bemidji, Minnesota	Saunders	L 0–3	2,556	1–18–1
December 17	7:05 pm	at Bemidji State*	Sanford Center • Bemidji, Minnesota	Saunders	L 0–5	3,256	1–19–1
December 30	7:00 pm	Mercyhurst*	Propst Arena • Huntsville, Alabama	Saunders	L 1–5	1,056	1–20–1
December 31	3:00 pm	Mercyhurst*	Propst Arena • Huntsville, Alabama	Saunders	L 3–4	1,062	1–21–1
January 6	8:35 pm	at #11 Denver*	Magness Arena • Denver	Saunders	W 3–2	4,842	2–21–1
January 7	8:05 pm	at #11 Denver*	Magness Arena • Denver	Saunders	L 2–5	5,123	2–22–1
January 20	7:05 pm	at #1 Minnesota–Duluth*	Amsoil Arena • Duluth, Minnesota	Saunders	L 1–2	6,614	2–23–1
January 21	7:05 pm	at #1 Minnesota–Duluth*	Amsoil Arena • Duluth, Minnesota	Saunders	L 3–4	6,757	2–24–1
February 3	6:00 pm	at #15 Maine*	Alfond Arena • Orono, Maine	Saunders	L 3–4 ^{OT}	3,987	2–25–1
February 4	6:00 pm	at #15 Maine*	Alfond Arena • Orono, Maine	Saunders	L 0–5	4,400	2–26–1
February 10	6:35 pm	at #20 Miami (OH)*	Steve Cady Arena • Oxford, Ohio	Saunders	L 1–3	2,667	2–27–1
February 11	6:05 pm	at #20 Miami (OH)*	Steve Cady Arena • Oxford, Ohio	Saunders	L 1–4	2,781	2–28–1
February 24	7:00 pm	US Under-18 Team*	Propst Arena • Huntsville, Alabama (Exhibition)	Saunders	L 2–3	1,105	2–28–1
February 25	3:00 pm	US Under-18 Team*	Propst Arena • Huntsville, Alabama (Exhibition)	Griggs	L 3–6	1,089	2–28–1
*Non-conference game. ^{#}Rankings from USCHO.com Poll. All times are in Central Time. Source:

=== Opponents by conference ===
Conference	Teams
CCHA	5 (Bowling Green, Lake Superior State, Miami (OH), Ohio State, Western Michigan)
Hockey East	5 (Maine, Merrimack, New Hampshire, Providence, UMass Lowell)
WCHA	5 (Bemidji State, Denver, Minnesota–Duluth, Minnesota State, Nebraska–Omaha)
Atlantic Hockey	2 (Air Force, Mercyhurst)
ECAC	0

== Player stats ==
As of February 11, 2012

=== Skaters ===
Player	Pos	Yr	GP	G	A	Pts	PIM	PPG	SHG	GWG
Kyle Lysaght	F	Fr	31	7	6	13	22	4	0	0
Mac Roy	F	So	30	6	6	12	26	2	0	1
Justin Cseter	F	Jr	31	4	8	12	12	0	0	0
Lasse Uusivirta	D	So	29	1	5	6	22	0	0	0
Tom Durnie	D	Sr	26	3	2	5	18	2	0	0
Sebastian Geoffrion	F	Jr	30	2	3	5	61	0	1	0
Alex Allan	F	So	30	1	4	5	8	0	0	0
Graeme Strukoff	D	Fr	31	1	4	5	71	0	0	0
Curtis deBruyn	D	Jr	31	0	5	5	12	0	0	0
Jamie Easton	F	Sr	31	2	2	4	16	1	0	1
Michael Webley	F	Fr	25	1	3	4	8	0	0	0
Jeff Vanderlugt	F	Fr	27	1	3	4	56	0	0	0
Craig Pierce	F	Fr	25	3	0	3	11	0	0	0
Tyler Kotlarz	F	Fr	24	2	1	3	10	0	0	0
Andrew Creppin	F	Fr	26	1	2	3	0	0	0	0
Doug Reid	F	Fr	30	0	3	3	12	0	0	0
Ben Reinhardt	D	Fr	31	0	3	3	4	0	0	0
Brice Geoffrion	F	So	31	2	0	2	29	0	0	0
Nickolas Gatt	D	So	25	0	1	1	8	0	0	0
C.J. Groh	G	So	2	0	0	0	0	0	0	0
John Griggs	G	Jr	6	0	0	0	0	0	0	0
Mat Hagen	D	So	13	0	0	0	14	0	0	0
Clarke Saunders	G	So	27	0	0	0	0	0	0	0
Team			31	37	61	98	420	9	1	2

=== Goaltenders ===
Player	Yr	GP	TOI	W	L	T	GA	GAA	SV	SV%	SO
Clarke Saunders	So	27	1534	2	23	1	95	3.72	918	0.906	0
John Griggs	Jr	6	242	0	4	0	20	4.96	103	0.837	0
C.J. Groh	So	2	80	0	1	0	9	6.75	36	0.800	0
