= 2012 CCHA men's ice hockey tournament =

2012 CCHA Men's ice hockey tournament
- 2012 CCHA Men's Ice Hockey Tournament Logo
- Dates: March 2–17, 2012
- Teams: 11
- Finals site: Joe Louis Arena; Detroit, Michigan
- Champions: Western Michigan (2nd title)
- Winning coach: Andy Murray (1st title)
- MVP: Frank Slubowski (Western Michigan)
- Attendance: 60,741 (all games)
- Top scorer: Dan DeSalvo (Bowling Green); (13 points)
- CCHA Men's Ice Hockey Tournaments

The 2012 CCHA Men's Ice Hockey Tournament is the 41st CCHA Men's Ice Hockey Tournament. It will be played between March 2 and March 17, 2012, at campus locations and at Joe Louis Arena in Detroit, Michigan, United States. Western Michigan won the Mason Cup and they earned the Central Collegiate Hockey Association's automatic bid to the 2012 NCAA Division I Men's Ice Hockey Tournament.

== Format ==
The tournament features four rounds of play. In the first round the sixth and eleventh, seventh and tenth, and eighth and ninth seeds as determined by the final regular season standings play a best-of-three series, with the winners advancing to the quarterfinals. There, the first seed and lowest-ranked first-round winner, the second seed and second-lowest-ranked first-round winner, the third seed and second-highest-ranked first-round winner, and the fourth seed and the fifth seed play a best-of-three series, with the winners advancing to the semifinals. In the semifinals, the highest and lowest seeds and second-highest and second-lowest seeds play a single game, with the winner advancing to the championship game and the loser advancing to the third-place game. The tournament champion receives an automatic bid to the 2012 NCAA Men's Division I Ice Hockey Tournament.

=== Regular season standings ===
Note: GP = Games played; W = Wins; L = Losses; T = Ties; PTS = Points; GF = Goals For; GA = Goals Against

2011–12 Central Collegiate Hockey Association standings
	Conference								Overall					
	GP	W	L	T	SW	PTS	GF	GA	GP	W	L	T	GF	GA
#2 Ferris State†	28	16	7	5	1	54	80	62	43	26	12	5	124	94
#7 Michigan	28	15	9	4	1	50	85	60	41	24	13	4	132	89
#14 Western Michigan*	28	14	10	4	4	50	72	61	41	21	14	6	114	92
#8 Miami	28	15	11	2	1	48	74	55	41	24	15	2	122	86
#15 Michigan State	28	14	11	3	2	47	80	68	39	19	16	4	111	103
#20 Northern Michigan	28	11	11	6	3	42	76	79	37	17	14	6	106	102
Lake Superior State	28	11	13	4	4	41	71	79	40	18	17	5	102	108
#19 Notre Dame	28	12	13	3	0	39	65	73	40	19	18	3	101	107
Ohio State	28	11	12	5	1	39	74	79	35	15	15	5	91	92
Alaska	28	0^	28^	0^	0^	30	63	76	36	0^	36^	0^	84	94
Bowling Green	28	5	19	4	3	22	40	88	44	14	25	5	85	129
Championship: Michigan 2, Western Michigan 3 † indicates conference regular season champion; * indicates conference tournament champion Rankings: USCHO.com Top 20 Poll^ Alaska was retroactively required to forfeit all wins and ties due to player ineligibilities.

== Bracket ==
First round March 2–4
8	Notre Dame	2	4	—
9	Ohio State	0	2	—
6	Northern Michigan	4	3	1
11	Bowling Green	2	5	4
7	Lake Superior State	4	2	—
10	Alaska	3	0	—

Quarterfinals; March 9–11
1	Ferris State	2	7	3
11	Bowling Green	3	4	4
4	Miami	6	4	—
5	Michigan State	0	1	—
3	Western Michigan	4	5	—
7	Lake Superior State	2	2	—
2	Michigan	2	3	—
8	Notre Dame	1	1	—

Semifinals; March 16
3	Western Michigan	6
4	Miami	2
2	Michigan	3*
11	Bowling Green	2

Championship; March 17
2	Michigan	2
3	Western Michigan	3
Third place
4	Miami	4
11	Bowling Green	1

=== Semifinals ===
==== (3) Western Michigan vs. (4) Miami ====
March 16 @ 4:35 pm	Western Michigan	6 - 2	Miami	Joe Louis Arena	Recap

==== (2) Michigan vs. (11) Bowling Green ====
March 16 @ 8:05 pm	Michigan	3 - 2 (OT)	Bowling Green	Joe Louis Arena	Recap

=== Third place ===
==== (4) Miami vs. (11) Bowling Green ====
March 17 @ 3:35 pm	Miami	4 - 1	Bowling Green	Joe Louis Arena	Recap

=== Championship ===
==== (2) Michigan vs. (3) Western Michigan ====
March 17 @ 7:35 pm	Michigan	2 - 3	Western Michigan	Joe Louis Arena	Recap

== Tournament awards ==
=== All-Tournament Team ===
- F Reilly Smith (Miami)
- F Greg Squires (Western Michigan)
- F Luke Moffatt (Michigan)
- D Danny DeKeyser (Western Michigan)
- D Lee Moffie (Michigan)
- G Frank Slubowski* (Western Michigan)

* Most Valuable Player(s)
