= Chris Luongo =

American ice hockey player and coach

- Born: March 17, 1967 (age 59) Detroit, Michigan, U.S.
- Height: 5 ft 10 in (178 cm)
- Weight: 206 lb (93 kg; 14 st 10 lb)
- Position: Defence
- Shot: Right
- Played for: Krefeld Pinguine; Nürnberg Ice Tigers; Munich Barons; EV Landshut; New York Islanders; Ottawa Senators; Detroit Red Wings
- Playing career: 1989–2004 Coaching career

Biographical details
- Education: Michigan State University

Coaching career (HC unless noted)
- 2005-2006: Motor City Mechanics (assistant)
- 2006–2008: Wayne State (assistant)
- 2008–2010: Alabama-Huntsville (assistant)
- 2010–2012: Alabama-Huntsville
- 2015-2017: U.S. NTDP (assistant)
- 2017-2022: Michigan State (assistant)

Head coaching record
- Overall: 6–54–3 (.119)

Christopher John Luongo (born March 17, 1967) is an American ice hockey coach and former ice hockey player. Luongo played in the National Hockey League (NHL) for the Detroit Red Wings, Ottawa Senators, and New York Islanders between 1991 and 1996. The rest of his career, which lasted from 1989 to 2004, was spent in various minor leagues, and then several years in the Deutsche Eishockey Liga. Internationally, Luongo played for the American national team at three World Championships. After retiring from playing, Luongo turned to coaching, and has spent several years as an assistant coach at the American collegiate level.

== Biography ==
Luongo was born in Detroit, Michigan, and grew up in Fraser, Michigan. As a youth, he played in the 1980 Quebec International Pee-Wee Hockey Tournament with the Detroit Compuware minor ice hockey team.

Luongo was a stay-at-home defenseman who played in 218 games in his NHL career, scoring 8 goals and 23 assists for 31 points and collecting 176 penalty minutes. Drafted by his hometown Red Wings in 1985, he then accepted a scholarship to Michigan State where he enjoyed a four-year career with the Spartans, earning the team's "Dr. John Downs Outstanding Defensive Player Award" in 1988 and 1989. He spent 1989 to 1992 in the Red Wings organization before signing with the Ottawa Senators as a free agent. After one season in Ottawa, he was traded to the New York Islanders, where he finished his NHL career in 1996.

Luongo was also a member of the U.S. squad at the 1996, 1997, and 2000 World Championships, winning the bronze medal in 1996.

From 1997 to 2004, Luongo played in Germany's Deutsche Eishockey Liga, playing for EV Landshut, Munich Barons, Nuremberg Ice Tigers and the Krefeld Pinguine.

Luongo currently resides in Novi, Michigan, and has two sons, Anthony and Christopher. He also has a dog named Tyson.

=== Coaching ===
Luongo spent two seasons as an assistant coach with the Wayne State Warriors. In September 2008 he joined the UAH Chargers as an assistant coach under head coach Danton Cole, who was a teammate of Luongo's at Michigan State. In 2010, he was named head coach of the Chargers, and coached the team for two seasons. After leaving UAH in 2012, he took a break from coaching until joining the National Team Development Program from 2015 to 2017 as assistant coach. From 2017 to 2022, Luongo served as the assistant coach for the Michigan State men's hockey team under Cole.

== Career statistics ==
=== Regular season and playoffs ===
			Regular season					Playoffs
Season	Team	League	GP	G	A	Pts	PIM	GP	G	A	Pts	PIM
1984–85	St. Clair Falcons	NAHL	41	2	27	29	—	—	—	—	—	—
1985–86	Michigan State University	CCHA	38	1	5	6	29	—	—	—	—	—
1986–87	Michigan State University	CCHA	27	4	16	20	38	—	—	—	—	—
1987–88	Michigan State University	CCHA	45	3	15	18	49	—	—	—	—	—
1988–89	Michigan State University	CCHA	47	4	21	25	42	—	—	—	—	—
1989–90	Phoenix Roadrunners	IHL	23	5	9	14	41	—	—	—	—	—
1989–90	Adirondack Red Wings	AHL	53	9	14	23	37	3	0	0	0	0
1990–91	Detroit Red Wings	NHL	4	0	1	1	4	—	—	—	—	—
1990–91	Adirondack Red Wings	AHL	76	14	25	39	71	2	0	0	0	7
1991–92	Adirondack Red Wings	AHL	80	6	20	26	60	19	3	5	8	10
1992–93	Ottawa Senators	NHL	76	3	9	12	68	—	—	—	—	—
1992–93	New Haven Senators	AHL	7	0	2	2	2	—	—	—	—	—
1993–94	New York Islanders	NHL	17	1	3	4	13	—	—	—	—	—
1993–94	Salt Lake Golden Eagles	IHL	51	9	31	40	54	—	—	—	—	—
1994–95	New York Islanders	NHL	47	1	3	4	36	—	—	—	—	—
1994–95	Denver Grizzlies	IHL	41	1	14	15	26	—	—	—	—	—
1995–96	New York Islanders	NHL	74	3	7	10	55	—	—	—	—	—
1996–97	Milwaukee Admirals	IHL	81	10	35	45	69	2	0	0	0	0
1997–98	EV Landshut	DEL	48	5	13	18	54	6	0	2	2	18
1998–99	EV Landshut	DEL	51	1	14	15	115	3	1	0	1	0
1998–99	Detroit Vipers	IHL	11	0	1	1	4	11	0	4	4	16
1999–00	Munich Barons	DEL	56	6	11	17	50	12	0	0	0	18
2000–01	Munich Barons	DEL	48	3	16	19	77	11	1	0	1	14
2001–02	Nürnberg Ice Tigers	DEL	60	7	19	26	50	4	0	0	0	2
2002–03	Nürnberg Ice Tigers	DEL	51	6	15	21	65	5	0	1	1	6
2003–04	Krefeld Pinguine	DEL	52	5	12	17	70	—	—	—	—	—
DEL totals			366	33	100	133	481	41	2	3	5	58
NHL totals			218	8	23	31	176	—	—	—	—	—

=== International ===
Year	Team	Event	GP	G	A	Pts	PIM
1996	United States	WC	8	1	0	1	6
1998	United States	WC	6	0	0	0	2
2000	United States	WC	5	1	0	1	0
Senior totals			19	2	0	2	8

=== Head coaching record ===
Record table
Season	Team	Overall	Conference	Standing	Postseason
Alabama-Huntsville Chargers Independent (2010–2012)
2010–11	Alabama–Huntsville	4–26–2			
2011–12	Alabama–Huntsville	2–28–1			
Alabama-Huntsville:		6–54–3			
Total:		6–54–3			
National champion Postseason invitational champion Conference regular season champion Conference regular season and conference tournament champion Division regular season champion Division regular season and conference tournament champion Conference tournament champion

== Awards and honors ==
Award	Year
All-NCAA All-Tournament Team	1987
All-CCHA Second Team	1988–89
