= 2010–11 Alabama–Huntsville Chargers men's ice hockey season =

American college ice hockey team season

2010–11 Alabama–Huntsville Chargers men's ice hockey
- Conference: Independent
- Record: 4–26–2
- Head coach: Chris Luongo (1st season)
- Assistant coaches: Mike Warde; Gavin Morgan
- Captain: Ryan Burkholder
- Alternate captain: Matt Baxter, Curtis deBruyn, Chris Fairbanks
- Home stadium: Propst Arena

The 2010–11 Alabama–Huntsville Chargers ice hockey team represented the University of Alabama in Huntsville in the 2010–11 NCAA Division I men's ice hockey season. The Chargers were coached by Chris Luongo who was in his first season as head coach. His assistant coaches were Mike Warde and Gavin Morgan. The Chargers played their home games in the Propst Arena at the Von Braun Center, competed as an independent and finished with an overall record of 4–26–2.

== Preseason ==
Following the 2009–10 season, the Chargers' conference, College Hockey America, dropped their men's division after Bemidji State, Niagara, and Robert Morris left for other conferences. UAH applied for admission to the Central Collegiate Hockey Association, but were denied, forcing the Chargers to play the 2010–11 season as an independent.

=== Coaching changes ===
On May 19, 2010, assistant coach John McCabe was named the head coach at Division III Finlandia University, ending a six-year tenure at UAH. On June 21, 2010, head coach Danton Cole was announced as the U.S. National Team Development Program’s Under-17 head coach. Remaining assistant coach Chris Luongo was named head coach on July 9. Assistant coach Mike Warde was announced on August 20, and Gavin Morgan was announced on August 27.

== Roster ==
As of September 4, 2010

No.	Nat.	Player	Class	Pos	Height	Weight	DoB	Hometown	Previous team
2		Ryan Burkholder (C)	Senior	D	6' 0" (1.83 m)	195 lb (88 kg)	1987-09-01	Newmarket, Ontario	Newmarket (OJHL)
5		Brice Geoffrion	Freshman	F	6' 0" (1.83 m)	195 lb (88 kg)	1990-11-04	Brentwood, Tennessee	Motor City (NAHL)
6		Cody Dion	Freshman	F	6' 4" (1.93 m)	225 lb (102 kg)	1990-03-21	Colorado Springs, Colorado	Okotoks (AJHL)
7		Jamie Easton	Junior	F	5' 8" (1.73 m)	165 lb (75 kg)	1988-01-05	Edmonton, Alberta	Bonnyville (AJHL)
8		Alex Allan	Freshman	F	6' 0" (1.83 m)	185 lb (84 kg)	1989-08-28	Calgary, Alberta	Victoria (BCHL)
10		Mat Hagen	Freshman	D	5' 10" (1.78 m)	185 lb (84 kg)	1989-12-27	Ottawa, Ontario	Kanata (CJHL)
11		Neil Ruffini	Senior	F	5' 10" (1.78 m)	195 lb (88 kg)	1988-03-14	Roswell, Georgia	Proctor Academy (USHS–NH)
12		Mac Roy	Freshman	F	5' 11" (1.8 m)	175 lb (79 kg)	1989-04-20	Chilliwack, British Columbia	Langley (BCHL)
13		Joey Koudys	Senior	F	5' 11" (1.8 m)	185 lb (84 kg)	1988-03-28	Grimsby, Ontario	Thorold (GOJHL)
14		Nickolas Gatt	Freshman	D	6' 3" (1.91 m)	195 lb (88 kg)	1990-12-20	Farmington Hills, Michigan	Topeka (NAHL)
15		Matt Baxter (A)	Senior	D	6' 3" (1.91 m)	180 lb (82 kg)	1988-08-04	Courtice, Ontario	Bowmanville (CCHL)
18		David Way	Freshman	F	6' 0" (1.83 m)	185 lb (84 kg)	1990-11-21	Fort Saskatchewan, Alberta	Sherwood Park (AJHL)
19		Chris Fairbanks (A)	Senior	F	6' 0" (1.83 m)	180 lb (82 kg)	1986-07-15	Milford, Michigan	Youngstown (NAHL)
20		Lasse Uusivirta	Freshman	D	6' 1" (1.85 m)	170 lb (77 kg)	1989-07-27	Espoo, Finland	Blues U20 (Jr. A SM-liiga)
21		Keenan Desmet	Sophomore	F	5' 11" (1.8 m)	183 lb (83 kg)	1988-07-07	Strathmore, Alberta	Salmon Arm (BCHL)
22		Sebastian Geoffrion	Sophomore	F	5' 10" (1.78 m)	190 lb (86 kg)	1989-07-26	Brentwood, Tennessee	Indiana (USHL)
23		Curtis deBruyn (A)	Sophomore	D	5' 10" (1.78 m)	186 lb (84 kg)	1988-10-07	Calgary, Alberta	Olds (AJHL)
24		Tom Durnie	Junior	D	6' 2" (1.88 m)	195 lb (88 kg)	1988-04-04	Calgary, Alberta	Canmore (AJHL)
26		Justin Cseter	Sophomore	F	5' 10" (1.78 m)	173 lb (78 kg)	1988-08-24	Menomonie, Wisconsin	Salmon Arm (BCHL)
27		Vince Bruni	Senior	F	6' 1" (1.85 m)	190 lb (86 kg)	1987-04-08	Toronto, Ontario	Springfield (NAHL)
28		Trevor Conrad	Freshman	D	6' 0" (1.83 m)	215 lb (98 kg)	1989-06-29	Spruce Grove, Alberta	Sherwood Park (AJHL)
31		John Griggs	Sophomore	G	6' 1" (1.85 m)	175 lb (79 kg)	1988-06-28	Barrington, Illinois	Cumberland (CJHL)
32		C. J. Groh	Freshman	G	6' 2" (1.88 m)	185 lb (84 kg)	1990-04-16	Cincinnati, Ohio	Waterloo (USHL)
33		Clarke Saunders	Freshman	G	6' 3" (1.91 m)	190 lb (86 kg)	1989-09-09	Brockville, Ontario	Brockville (CJHL)

== Regular season ==
=== Schedule ===
- Green background indicates win.
- Red background indicates loss.
- Yellow background indicates tie.

Date	Time	Opponent	Site	Decision	Result	Attendance	Record
October 7	7:05 pm	Ferris State*	Propst Arena • Huntsville, Alabama	Saunders	L 1–4	1,283	0–1–0
October 8	7:05 pm	Ferris State*	Propst Arena • Huntsville, Alabama	Saunders	W 4–2	1,009	1–1–0
October 15	7:05 pm	at #15 Wisconsin*	Kohl Center • Madison, Wisconsin	Saunders	L 0–7	10,769	1–2–0
October 17	1:05 pm	at #15 Wisconsin*	Kohl Center • Madison, Wisconsin	Saunders	L 2–5	11,731	1–3–0
October 22	6:05 pm	at Bowling Green*	BGSU Ice Arena • Bowling Green, Ohio	Saunders	L 4–5 ^{OT}	1,749	1–4–0
October 23	6:05 pm	at Bowling Green*	BGSU Ice Arena • Bowling Green, Ohio	Groh	L 2–4	2,630	1–5–0
October 29	6:05 pm	at #11 Michigan State*	Munn Ice Arena • East Lansing, Michigan	Groh	T 4–4 ^{OT}	4,829	1–5–1
October 30	6:05 pm	at #11 Michigan State*	Munn Ice Arena • East Lansing, Michigan	Saunders	L 1–2	4,886	1–6–1
November 5	6:05 pm	at Ohio State*	Value City Arena • Columbus, Ohio	Saunders	L 2–6	2,284	1–7–1
November 6	6:05 pm	at Ohio State*	Value City Arena • Columbus, Ohio	Groh	L 1–5	2,197	1–8–1
November 12	7:05 pm	Providence*	Propst Arena • Huntsville, Alabama	Saunders	L 1–3	1,456	1–9–1
November 13	7:05 pm	Providence*	Propst Arena • Huntsville, Alabama	Groh	L 2–4	1,106	1–10–1
November 26	3:00 pm	vs. Bowling Green*	Houston Field House • Troy, New York (Rensselaer Holiday Tournament)	Groh	L 1–5	2,403	1–11–1
November 27	3:00 pm	vs. Connecticut*	Houston Field House • Troy, New York (Rensselaer Holiday Tournament)	Saunders	W 6–2	2,438	2–11–1
December 3	6:00 pm	at Cornell*	Lynah Rink • Ithaca, New York	Saunders	L 1–3	4,075	2–12–1
December 4	6:00 pm	at Cornell*	Lynah Rink • Ithaca, New York	Griggs	T 2–2 ^{OT}	4,174	2–12–2
December 10	7:05 pm	Robert Morris*	Propst Arena • Huntsville, Alabama	Griggs	L 3–4	1,762	2–13–2
December 11	7:05 pm	Robert Morris*	Propst Arena • Huntsville, Alabama	Saunders	L 1–2	872	2–14–2
December 16	6:05 pm	at Mercyhurst*	Mercyhurst Ice Center • Erie, Pennsylvania	Saunders	L 3–8	401	2–15–2
December 17	6:05 pm	at Mercyhurst*	Mercyhurst Ice Center • Erie, Pennsylvania	Griggs	L 3–4 ^{OT}	308	2–16–2
December 30	7:05 pm	#14 RPI*	Propst Arena • Huntsville, Alabama	Griggs	L 1–2	1,133	2–17–2
December 31	3:05 pm	#14 RPI*	Propst Arena • Huntsville, Alabama	Griggs	L 1–2	852	2–18–2
January 7	7:05 pm	Bemidji State*	Propst Arena • Huntsville, Alabama	Griggs	L 1–3	1,003	2–19–2
January 8	3:05 pm	Bemidji State*	Propst Arena • Huntsville, Alabama	Saunders	W 4–3	1,103	3–19–2
January 14	7:05 pm	#15 Merrimack*	Bridgestone Arena • Nashville, Tennessee	Saunders	L 4–5	1,976	3–20–2
January 15	1:05 pm	#15 Merrimack*	Bridgestone Arena • Nashville, Tennessee	Griggs	L 0–7	1,785	3–21–2
January 21	8:35 pm	at Colorado College*	Colorado Springs World Arena • Colorado Springs, Colorado	Griggs	L 0–7	5,971	3–22–2
January 22	8:05 pm	at Colorado College*	Colorado Springs World Arena • Colorado Springs, Colorado	Saunders	L 1–4	6,461	3–23–2
January 28	7:35 pm	at #15 Nebraska–Omaha*	CenturyLink Center • Omaha, Nebraska	Saunders	L 0–4	6,376	3–24–2
January 29	7:05 pm	at #15 Nebraska–Omaha*	CenturyLink Center • Omaha, Nebraska	Saunders	W 2–1 ^{OT}	6,836	4–24–2
February 11	6:05 pm	at Ferris State*	Ewigleben Arena • Big Rapids, Michigan	Saunders	L 2–5	1,258	4–25–2
February 12	6:05 pm	at Ferris State*	Ewigleben Arena • Big Rapids, Michigan	Griggs	L 1–5	1,490	4–26–2
February 25	7:05 pm	US Under-18 Team*	Propst Arena • Huntsville, Alabama (Exhibition)	Saunders	L 1–8	1,342	4–26–2
February 26	3:05 pm	US Under-18 Team*	Propst Arena • Huntsville, Alabama (Exhibition)	Griggs	L 3–5	856	4–26–2
*Non-conference game. ^{#}Rankings from USCHO.com Poll. All times are in Central Time. Source:

=== Opponents by conference ===
Conference	Teams
CCHA	4 (Bowling Green, Ferris State, Michigan State, Ohio State)
WCHA	4 (Bemidji State, Colorado College, Nebraska–Omaha, Wisconsin)
Atlantic Hockey	3 (Connecticut, Mercyhurst, Robert Morris)
Hockey East	2 (Merrimack, Providence)
ECAC	2 (Cornell, RPI)

== Player stats ==
As of February 12, 2011

=== Skaters ===
Player	Pos	Yr	GP	G	A	Pts	PIM	PPG	SHG	GWG
Matt Baxter	D	Sr	32	9	13	22	22	6	0	0
Keenan Desmet	F	So	31	8	10	18	63	4	0	1
Jamie Easton	F	Jr	32	6	12	18	41	4	0	0
Mac Roy	F	Fr	31	6	9	15	34	3	0	0
Tom Durnie	D	Jr	31	4	10	14	34	4	0	0
Justin Cseter	F	So	32	2	12	14	14	0	0	0
Neil Ruffini	F	Sr	32	5	7	12	32	3	0	0
Curtis deBruyn	D	So	32	2	6	8	51	1	0	1
Sebastian Geoffrion	F	So	28	3	4	7	115	0	0	1
Joey Koudys	F	Sr	32	4	2	6	24	1	0	0
Chris Fairbanks	F	Sr	27	2	4	6	16	1	0	0
Ryan Burkholder	D	Sr	28	1	5	6	37	0	0	0
Vince Bruni	F	Sr	32	4	1	5	26	0	0	0
Lasse Uusivirta	D	Fr	18	0	4	4	16	0	0	0
Alex Allan	F	Fr	22	2	1	3	4	0	0	0
Cody Dion	F	Fr	29	2	1	3	6	0	0	1
Nickolas Gatt	D	Fr	27	1	2	3	6	1	0	0
John Griggs	G	So	10	0	1	1	0	0	0	0
Mat Hagen	D	Fr	22	0	1	1	2	0	0	0
David Way	F	Fr	26	0	1	1	8	0	0	0
Trevor Conrad	D	Fr	4	0	0	0	4	0	0	0
C.J. Groh	G	Fr	7	0	0	0	0	0	0	0
Clarke Saunders	G	Fr	19	0	0	0	2	0	0	0
Brice Geoffrion	F	Fr	28	0	0	0	27	0	0	0
Team			32	61	106	167	584	28	0	4

=== Goaltenders ===
Player	Yr	GP	TOI	W	L	T	GA	GAA	SV	SV%	SO
Clarke Saunders	Fr	19	1059	4	14	0	67	3.80	587	0.898	0
John Griggs	So	10	517	0	8	1	34	3.95	257	0.883	0
C.J. Groh	Fr	7	346	0	4	1	25	4.33	184	0.880	0
