= Kent Patterson =

American ice hockey player (born 1989)

- Born: September 15, 1989 (age 36) Plymouth, Minnesota, U.S.
- Height: 6 ft 1 in (185 cm)
- Weight: 196 lb (89 kg; 14 st 0 lb)
- Position: Goaltender
- Caught: Left
- Played for: Lake Erie Monsters
- NHL draft: 113th overall, 2007; Colorado Avalanche
- Playing career: 2012–2018

Kent Patterson (born September 15, 1989) is an American former professional ice hockey goaltender. He was drafted by the Colorado Avalanche in the 2007 NHL entry draft and played in the American Hockey League (AHL) for the Lake Erie Monsters.

== Playing career ==
Patterson played high school hockey in his native Minnesota with The Blake School before crossing to minor junior hockey with the Cedar Rapids RoughRiders in the United States Hockey League. After an impressive season culminating in a selection to the USHL All-Rookie team, Patterson was drafted by the Colorado Avalanche in the 4th round (113th overall) of the 2007 NHL entry draft.

Committing to the University of Minnesota to play with the Golden Gophers in the Western Collegiate Hockey Association conference, Patterson assumed the backup position to Alex Kangas for his freshman and sophomore seasons. In his junior season in 2010–11, Patterson emerged as the starting goaltender for the Golden Gophers and in 30 appearances accumulated 14 victories to be named in the All-WCHA Second Team. As a senior in 2011–12, Patterson compiled his most successful collegiate season, earning a career high 28 wins in 43 games for the Gophers. Patterson was subsequently awarded the WCHA Goaltending Champion award as the goalie with the lowest goals against average of 2.06 and a starting place in the All-WCHA First Team.

On May 11, 2012, Patterson signed his first professional contract by signing to a two-year entry-level deal with the Avalanche. After initially attending American Hockey League affiliate, the Lake Erie Monsters training camp, Patterson was reassigned to make his pro debut to start the 2012–13 season with the Denver Cutthroats of the CHL, a secondary affiliate of the Avalanche. Patterson started in the Cutthroats inaugural game and recorded his first professional win over the Missouri Mavericks on October 19, 2012. Patterson's impressive play behind the Cutthroats defense was rewarded when he was selected as the CHL's Goaltender and Rookie of the Month award for November. On January 31, he was recalled to serve as a backup for Monsters of the AHL. In his American League debut, Patterson recorded a shutout in a 1–0 shoot-out loss to the Abbotsford Heat on February 10, 2013. After four games with the Monsters, Patterson was returned to the Cutthroats and remained for the duration of their campaign. At the conclusion of the Cutthroats opening round playoff loss, Patterson was recalled to the Monsters and notched his first AHL win with a victory over the Syracuse Crunch on April 9, 2013.

At the conclusion of his entry-level contract, and having spent the majority of his tenure with secondary affiliate, the Denver Cutthroats, Patterson was not tendered a new contract by the Avalanche in releasing him to free agency. On August 4, 2014, he was signed to a one-year contract with ECHL club, the Orlando Solar Bears. On January 16, 2015 he was traded by Orlando to the Gwinnett Gladiators. He assumed starting goaltender status with Gwinnett, posting just 4 wins in 20 games.

After spending the 2015–16 season, sharing starting duties with the renamed Atlanta Gladiators, Patterson was signed for the following 2016–17 season, with fellow ECHL club, the Rapid City Rush, on October 3, 2016. Patterson earned 2 wins in 8 games with the Rush before he was released from his contract on November 8, 2016. He was immediately picked up by the Quad City Mallards but was later released on November 17, without having made an appearance with the club.

Patterson ended his 6-year professional career following the 2017–18 season, opting to move into coaching in accepting a goaltending coach role with junior club, the Waterloo Black Hawks of the USHL.

== Career statistics ==
			Regular season									Playoffs
Season	Team	League	GP	W	L	T/OT	MIN	GA	SO	GAA	SV%	GP	W	L	MIN	GA	SO	GAA	SV%
2004–05	Blake	MSHS	14	9	4	0	673	27	0	2.05		—	—	—	—	—	—	—	—
2005–06	Blake	MSHS	25	14	8	0	406	1249	0	2.70		—	—	—	—	—	—	—	—
2006–07	Cedar Rapids RoughRiders	USHL	29	20	5	3	1710	83	2	2.91	.913	1	0	1	41	6	0	8.78	.778
2007–08	Cedar Rapids RoughRiders	USHL	20	10	6	1	1109	46	1	2.49	.912	—	—	—	—	—	—	—	—
2008–09	University of Minnesota	WCHA	7	0	2	1	231	9	0	2.34	.925	—	—	—	—	—	—	—	—
2009–10	University of Minnesota	WCHA	8	2	4	1	406	21	0	3.10	.901	—	—	—	—	—	—	—	—
2010–11	University of Minnesota	WCHA	30	14	9	6	1724	73	0	2.54	.919	—	—	—	—	—	—	—	—
2011–12	University of Minnesota	WCHA	43	28	14	1	2557	99	7	2.32	.907	—	—	—	—	—	—	—	—
2012–13	Denver Cutthroats	CHL	33	14	10	6	1812	91	1	3.01	.910	2	0	1	92	5	0	3.25	.868
2012–13	Lake Erie Monsters	AHL	5	1	2	1	259	11	1	2.55	.907	—	—	—	—	—	—	—	—
2013–14	Denver Cutthroats	CHL	40	23	10	7	2392	108	2	2.71	.922	15	8	7	909	41	2	2.71	.928
2013–14	Lake Erie Monsters	AHL	2	1	1	0	120	6	0	3.00	.902	—	—	—	—	—	—	—	—
2014–15	Orlando Solar Bears	ECHL	17	5	9	2	904	47	1	3.12	.901	—	—	—	—	—	—	—	—
2014–15	Gwinnett Gladiators	ECHL	20	4	11	3	1060	63	0	3.57	.897	—	—	—	—	—	—	—	—
2015–16	Atlanta Gladiators	ECHL	32	14	13	4	1819	90	0	2.97	.901	—	—	—	—	—	—	—	—
2016–17	Rapid City Rush	ECHL	8	2	3	1	383	27	0	4.22	.883	—	—	—	—	—	—	—	—
2016–17	Atlanta Gladiators	ECHL	5	2	1	0	176	12	0	4.08	.885	—	—	—	—	—	—	—	—
2016–17	Wichita Thunder	ECHL	5	2	2	0	204	15	0	4.42	.867	—	—	—	—	—	—	—	—
2017–18	Pensacola Ice Flyers	SPHL	3	1	1	0	161	6	0	2.24	.900	—	—	—	—	—	—	—	—
2017–18	Fayetteville Marksmen	SPHL	4	1	2	1	205	16	0	4.69	.899	—	—	—	—	—	—	—	—
2017–18	Kansas City Mavericks	ECHL	2	1	1	0	125	7	0	3.37	.900	—	—	—	—	—	—	—	—
AHL totals			7	2	3	1	379	17	1	2.69	.905	—	—	—	—	—	—	—	—

== Awards and honors ==
Award	Year
USHL
All-Rookie Team	2007
College
All-WCHA Second Team	2011
WCHA Goaltending Champion	2012
All-WCHA First Team	2012
AHCA West Second-Team All-American	2011–12
