= Danny DeKeyser =

American ice hockey player (born 1990)

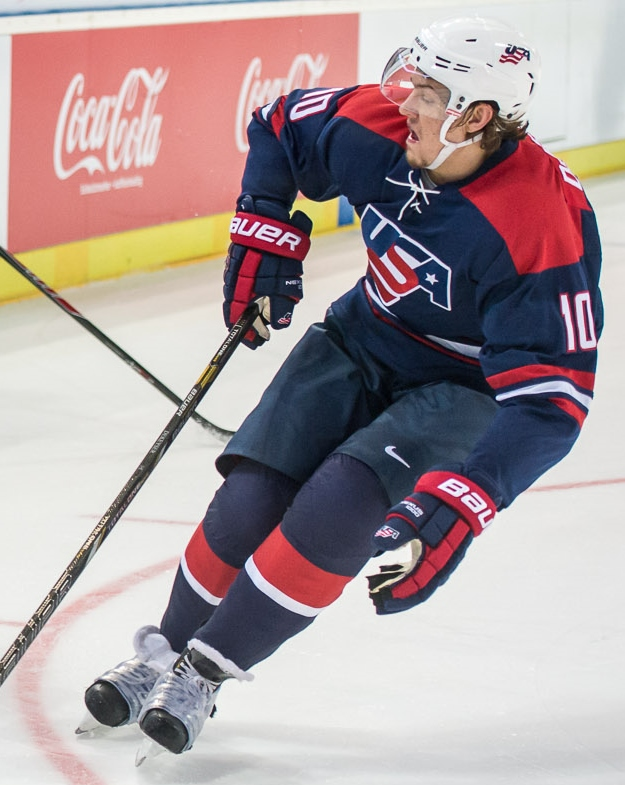
- DeKeyser with the United States in 2014
- Born: March 7, 1990 (age 36) Detroit, Michigan, U.S.
- Height: 6 ft 3 in (191 cm)
- Weight: 192 lb (87 kg; 13 st 10 lb)
- Position: Defense
- Shot: Left
- Played for: Detroit Red Wings
- National team: United States
- NHL draft: Undrafted
- Playing career: 2013–2022

Daniel Christopher DeKeyser (born March 7, 1990) is an American former professional hockey defenseman and current Detroit Red Wings studio analyst. He played as an alternate captain for the Detroit Red Wings in the National Hockey League (NHL).

== Playing career ==
=== Amateur ===
As a youth, DeKeyser played in the 2003 Quebec International Pee-Wee Hockey Tournament with the Detroit Little Caesars minor ice hockey team. He later played midget hockey with the Compuware AAA program from 2006 to 2008, before signing with the Trail Smoke Eaters of the British Columbia Hockey League (BCHL) for the 2008–09 season, where he recorded eight goals and 17 assists in 58 games. For his efforts, he was named the Trail Smoke Eaters' Defenseman of the Year. During the 2009–10 season, DeKeyser played for the Sioux City Musketeers of the United States Hockey League (USHL), where he recorded one goal and ten assists in 41 games. Following the 2009–10 season, DeKeyser committed to play college ice hockey for the Western Michigan Broncos.

During the 2010–11 season, DeKeyser appeared in 42 games, where he recorded five goals and 12 assists. He was named to the Central Collegiate Hockey Association (CCHA) All-Rookie team, and named to the CCHA All-Tournament Team for tallying two assists and helping shut down the University of Michigan’s high-powered offense during the CCHA Semifinals and Finals. DeKeyser ranked second on the team in plus-minus with a +12 rating, and led the team in blocked shots with 54. DeKeyser recorded his first collegiate goal on October 8, 2010, in a game against Canisius College.

During the 2011–12 season, DeKeyser appeared in 41 games, where he recorded five goals and 12 assists. He was named to the Second Team All-American, Second Team All-CCHA, CCHA Best Defensive Defenseman, and CCHA All-Tournament Team. He became just the second Bronco player in program history to be named CCHA Best Defensive Defenseman.

During the 2012–13 season, DeKeyser appeared in 35 games, where he recorded two goals and 13 assists. He was named to the First Team All-CCHA, and became the first Bronco to be named CCHA Best Defensive Defenseman twice after winning it in consecutive seasons. In three seasons with the Broncos, DeKeyser racked up 12 goals and 37 assists in 118 games.

=== Professional ===
After three years with Western Michigan, DeKeyser was being pursued by multiple teams around the NHL. Eventually, he decided to play for his hometown team and signed a two-year contract with the Detroit Red Wings on March 29, 2013. He began playing for Detroit one week later and recorded his first NHL point against the Nashville Predators on April 14, 2013, assisting on a Henrik Zetterberg goal. DeKeyser appeared in 11 regular season and two post-season games for the Red Wings during the 2012–13 season. Following the conclusion of Detroit's Stanley Cup playoff run in 2013, he joined the Grand Rapids Griffins of the American Hockey League (AHL) during the 2013 Calder Cup playoffs, where he recorded one assist in six games and helped the team capture their first-ever Calder Cup championship.

On November 4, 2013, DeKeyser scored his first career NHL goal in a game against the Winnipeg Jets. During the 2013–14 season, DeKeyser recorded four goals and 19 assists, as well as a +10 rating, in 65 games. He ranked among the NHL's top rookie blueliners in points (eighth), plus-minus (tied for fourth) and ice time (second). He also placed third among all rookies, and second on Detroit overall, with 116 blocked shots. On September 16, 2014, the Red Wings signed DeKeyser to a two-year, $4.375 million contract extension. DeKeyser was named the 2014 Detroit Red Wings–Detroit Sports Broadcasters Association (DSBA) Rookie of the Year, receiving the award in a pre-game ceremony on November 9, 2014, at Joe Louis Arena.

On July 26, 2016, the Red Wings signed DeKeyser to a six-year, $30 million contract.

As a free agent following the conclusion of the 2021–22 season and his six-year deal with the Red Wings, DeKeyser went un-signed over the summer. On September 10, 2022, DeKeyser agreed to a professional tryout to join the Vancouver Canucks training camp. After attending camp and participating in the pre-season, DeKeyser was unable to earn a contract offer from the Canucks and was released from his tryout. To begin the 2022–23 season, DeKeyser opted to continue his career in the AHL, agreeing to a professional tryout contract with the Toronto Marlies, the primary affiliate to the Toronto Maple Leafs, on October 19, 2022. He registered 1 goal in 3 appearances with the Marlies, before suffering an injury and was later released from his PTO on November 8, 2022.

== International play ==
DeKeyser represented the United States at the 2014 IIHF World Championship, where he recorded two assists in eight games. DeKeyser again represented the United States at the 2017 IIHF World Championship, where he recorded no points in eight games.

== Personal life ==
DeKeyser, a native of Macomb, Michigan, is the son of Michael and Linda DeKeyser. On February 13, 2016, he proposed to girlfriend Melissa Beurmann. They married in September 2016, and Beurmann gave birth to their first child in February 2018.

DeKeyser was a communication major at Western Michigan University and graduated from De La Salle Collegiate High School. In 2018, he was inducted into the Western Michigan University Hockey Ring of Honor.

== Career statistics ==
=== Regular season and playoffs ===
			Regular season					Playoffs
Season	Team	League	GP	G	A	Pts	PIM	GP	G	A	Pts	PIM
2006–07	Compuware 18U AAA	MWEHL	26	3	6	9	30	—	—	—	—	—
2007–08	Compuware 18U AAA	MWEHL	25	1	13	14	26	4	1	1	2	9
2008–09	Trail Smoke Eaters	BCHL	58	8	17	25	12	3	1	0	1	4
2009–10	Sioux City Musketeers	USHL	41	1	10	11	12	—	—	—	—	—
2010–11	Western Michigan University	CCHA	42	5	12	17	43	—	—	—	—	—
2011–12	Western Michigan University	CCHA	41	5	12	17	42	—	—	—	—	—
2012–13	Western Michigan University	CCHA	35	2	13	15	22	—	—	—	—	—
2012–13	Detroit Red Wings	NHL	11	0	1	1	2	2	0	0	0	0
2012–13	Grand Rapids Griffins	AHL	—	—	—	—	—	6	0	1	1	8
2013–14	Detroit Red Wings	NHL	65	4	19	23	30	5	0	0	0	6
2014–15	Detroit Red Wings	NHL	80	2	29	31	42	7	1	0	1	12
2015–16	Detroit Red Wings	NHL	78	8	12	20	44	5	0	1	1	4
2016–17	Detroit Red Wings	NHL	82	4	8	12	33	—	—	—	—	—
2017–18	Detroit Red Wings	NHL	65	6	6	12	28	—	—	—	—	—
2018–19	Detroit Red Wings	NHL	52	5	15	20	39	—	—	—	—	—
2019–20	Detroit Red Wings	NHL	8	0	4	4	4	—	—	—	—	—
2020–21	Detroit Red Wings	NHL	47	4	8	12	18	—	—	—	—	—
2021–22	Detroit Red Wings	NHL	59	0	11	11	26	—	—	—	—	—
2022–23	Toronto Marlies	AHL	3	1	0	1	0	—	—	—	—	—
NHL totals			547	33	113	146	266	19	1	1	2	22

=== International ===
Year	Team	Event	Result	GP	G	A	Pts	PIM
2014	United States	WC	6th	8	0	2	2	16
2017	United States	WC	5th	8	0	0	0	6
Senior totals				16	0	2	2	22

== Awards and honors ==
Award	Year
College
All-CCHA Rookie Team	2010–11
CCHA All-Tournament Team	2011, 2012
All-CCHA Second Team	2011–12
AHCA West Second-Team All-American	2011–12
All-CCHA First Team	2012–13
AHCA West Second-Team All-American	2012–13
Detroit Red Wings
Rookie of the Year"	2014

Awards and achievements
Preceded by Sean Lorenz	CCHA Best Defensive Defenseman; 2011–12 / 2012–13	Succeeded by Kyle Looft
