= 2011–12 NCAA Division I men's ice hockey season =

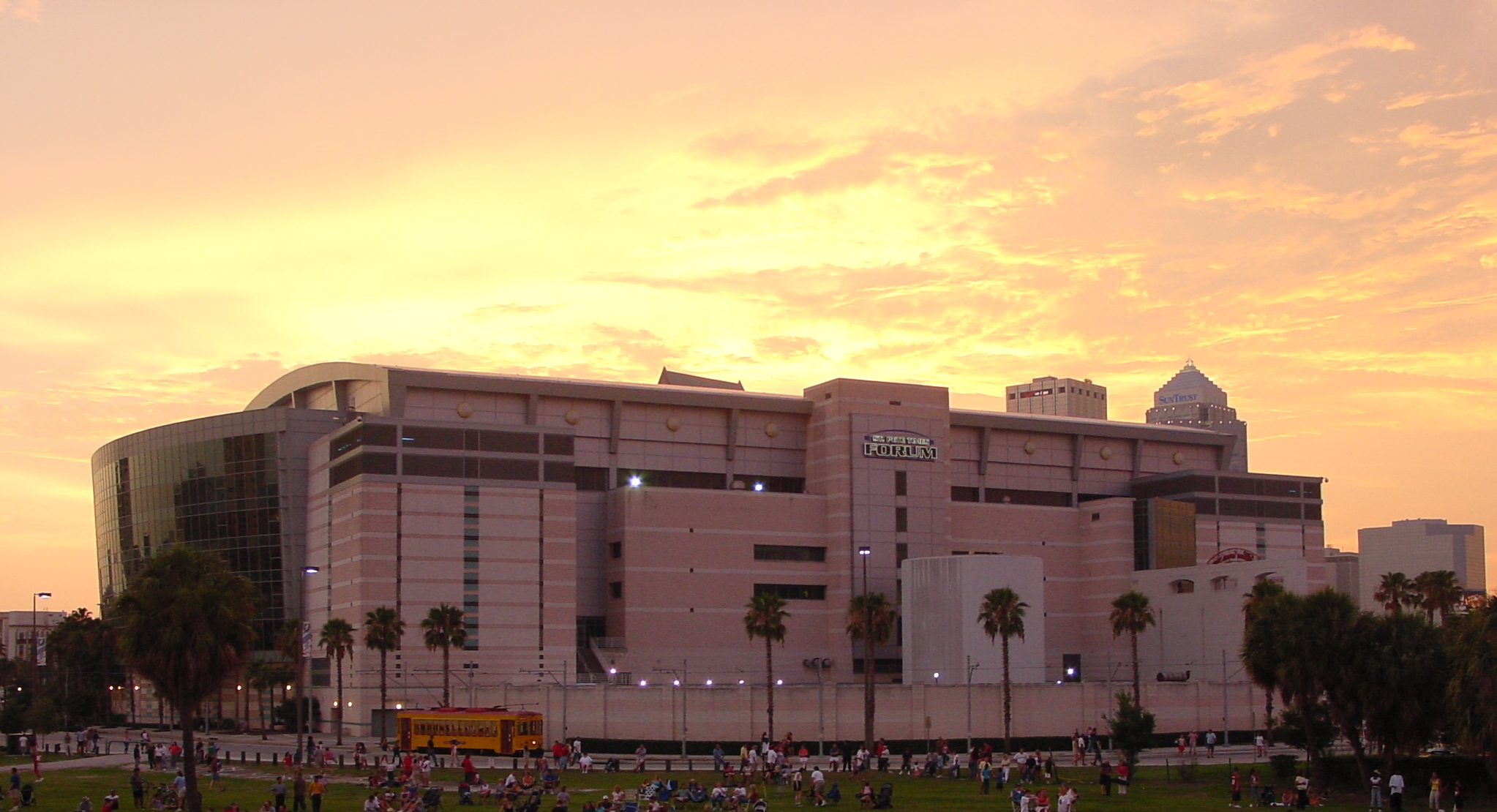
- The Tampa Bay Times Forum hosted the 2012 NCAA Division I men's ice hockey tournament
- Duration: October 1, 2011– April 7, 2012
- NCAA tournament: 2012
- National championship: Tampa Bay Times Forum; Tampa, Florida
- NCAA champion: Boston College
- Hobey Baker Award: Jack Connolly (Minnesota–Duluth)

The 2011–12 NCAA Division I men's ice hockey season began on October 1, 2011 and concluded with the 2012 NCAA Division I men's ice hockey tournament's championship game on April 7, 2012 at the Tampa Bay Times Forum in Tampa, Florida. This was the 65th season in which an NCAA ice hockey championship was held and is the 118th year overall where an NCAA school fielded a team.

== Season Outlook ==
=== Pre-season polls ===
The top teams in the nation as ranked before the start of the season.

The U.S. College Hockey Online poll was voted on by coaches, media, and NHL scouts. The USA Today/USA Hockey Magazine poll was voted on by coaches and media.

USCHO Poll
Rank	Team
1	Notre Dame (11)
2	Miami (12)
3	North Dakota (5)
4	Denver
5	Boston College (5)
6	Michigan
7	Colorado College
8	Minnesota–Duluth (10)
9	Yale (1)
10	Boston University (2)
11	Union
12	New Hampshire
13	Western Michigan
14	Nebraska–Omaha
15	Merrimack
16	Maine
17	Wisconsin
18	Rensselaer
19	Minnesota
20	Cornell

USA Today Poll
Rank	Team
1	Miami (15)
2	Notre Dame (4)
3	North Dakota (3)
4	Denver
5	Boston College (1)
6	Boston University (3)
7	Colorado College
8	Yale (2)
9	Michigan
10	Minnesota–Duluth (6)
11	Union
12	New Hampshire
13	Western Michigan
14	Nebraska–Omaha
15	Maine

== Regular season ==
=== Standings ===
2011–12 Atlantic Hockey standings
	Conference record							Overall record					
	GP	W	L	T	PTS	GF	GA	GP	W	L	T	GF	GA
#16 Air Force†*	27	15	6	6	36	85	52	39	21	11	7	119	83
Niagara	27	14	6	7	35	80	53	37	17	11	9	101	81
RIT	27	14	7	6	34	72	52	39	20	13	6	99	86
Mercyhurst	27	15	8	4	34	79	68	40	20	16	4	111	116
Holy Cross	27	15	8	4	34	93	70	39	20	15	4	120	107
Bentley	27	13	7	7	33	81	59	40	16	16	8	114	109
Robert Morris	27	13	9	5	31	72	58	39	17	17	5	102	103
Connecticut	27	12	12	3	27	78	67	39	16	19	4	112	105
Canisius	27	10	14	3	23	54	74	36	10	22	4	66	111
American International	27	6	18	3	15	57	98	37	8	26	3	82	137
Sacred Heart	27	4	20	3	11	66	122	37	6	28	3	84	173
Army	27	3	19	5	11	52	96	34	4	23	7	65	120
Championship: Air Force 4, RIT 0 † indicates conference regular season champion; * indicates conference tournament champion Rankings: USCHO.com Top 20 Poll

2011–12 Central Collegiate Hockey Association standings
	Conference								Overall					
	GP	W	L	T	SW	PTS	GF	GA	GP	W	L	T	GF	GA
#2 Ferris State†	28	16	7	5	1	54	80	62	43	26	12	5	124	94
#7 Michigan	28	15	9	4	1	50	85	60	41	24	13	4	132	89
#14 Western Michigan*	28	14	10	4	4	50	72	61	41	21	14	6	114	92
#8 Miami	28	15	11	2	1	48	74	55	41	24	15	2	122	86
#15 Michigan State	28	14	11	3	2	47	80	68	39	19	16	4	111	103
#20 Northern Michigan	28	11	11	6	3	42	76	79	37	17	14	6	106	102
Lake Superior State	28	11	13	4	4	41	71	79	40	18	17	5	102	108
#19 Notre Dame	28	12	13	3	0	39	65	73	40	19	18	3	101	107
Ohio State	28	11	12	5	1	39	74	79	35	15	15	5	91	92
Alaska	28	0^	28^	0^	0^	30	63	76	36	0^	36^	0^	84	94
Bowling Green	28	5	19	4	3	22	40	88	44	14	25	5	85	129
Championship: Michigan 2, Western Michigan 3 † indicates conference regular season champion; * indicates conference tournament champion Rankings: USCHO.com Top 20 Poll^ Alaska was retroactively required to forfeit all wins and ties due to player ineligibilities.

2011–12 NCAA Division I Independent ice hockey standings
	Overall					
	GP	W	L	T	GF	GA
Alabama–Huntsville	31	2	28	1	37	126
Rankings: USCHO.com Top 20 Poll

2011–12 ECAC Hockey standings
	Conference							Overall					
	GP	W	L	T	PTS	GF	GA	GP	W	L	T	GF	GA
#3 Union†*	22	14	4	4	32	76	38	41	26	8	7	143	75
#10 Cornell	22	12	4	6	30	66	46	35	19	9	7	100	79
#18 Harvard	22	8	5	9	25	61	59	34	13	10	11	106	100
Colgate	22	11	10	1	23	60	57	39	19	17	3	121	113
Quinnipiac	22	9	8	5	23	60	57	40	20	14	6	122	98
Yale	22	10	10	2	22	74	61	35	16	16	3	123	106
Clarkson	22	9	9	4	22	57	60	39	16	17	6	105	109
St. Lawrence	22	10	11	1	21	50	64	36	14	19	3	88	120
Dartmouth	22	8	11	3	19	63	74	33	13	16	4	93	102
Rensselaer	22	7	12	3	17	43	61	39	12	24	3	78	111
Princeton	22	6	12	4	16	58	72	32	9	16	7	85	105
Brown	22	5	13	4	14	54	75	32	9	18	5	75	97
Championship: Union 3, Harvard 1 † indicates conference regular season champion (Cleary Cup) * indicates conference tournament champion (Whitelaw Cup); Rankings: USCHO.com Top 20 Poll

2011–12 Hockey East standings
	Conference							Overall					
	GP	W	L	T	PTS	GF	GA	GP	W	L	T	GF	GA
#1 Boston College†*	27	19	7	1	39	96	60	44	33	10	1	157	89
#11 Boston University	27	17	9	1	35	101	70	39	23	15	1	139	112
#9 Massachusetts–Lowell	27	17	9	1	35	90	68	38	24	13	1	126	94
#13 Maine	27	15	10	2	32	91	80	40	23	14	3	133	114
#17 Merrimack	27	13	9	5	31	70	65	37	18	12	7	102	83
New Hampshire	27	11	14	2	24	68	74	37	15	19	3	108	110
Providence	27	10	14	3	23	68	89	38	14	20	4	94	122
Massachusetts	27	9	14	4	22	83	92	36	13	18	5	114	118
Northeastern	27	9	14	4	22	73	82	34	13	16	5	97	101
Vermont	27	3	23	1	7	54	114	34	6	27	1	73	140
Championship: Boston College 4, Maine 1 † indicates conference regular season champion; * indicates conference tournament champion Rankings: USCHO.com Top 20 Poll

2011–12 Western Collegiate Hockey Association standings
	Conference							Overall					
	GP	W	L	T	PTS	GF	GA	GP	W	L	T	GF	GA
#4 Minnesota†	28	20	8	0	40	88	57	43	28	14	1	155	99
#6 Minnesota–Duluth	28	16	7	5	37	103	73	41	25	10	6	147	106
#12 Denver	28	16	8	4	36	96	79	43	25	14	4	139	111
#5 North Dakota*	28	16	11	1	33	82	73	42	26	13	3	135	108
Colorado College	28	15	12	1	31	95	86	36	18	16	2	114	104
St. Cloud State	28	12	12	4	28	86	74	39	17	17	5	120	104
Omaha	28	11	12	5	27	83	85	38	14	18	6	106	112
Michigan Tech	28	11	13	4	26	85	87	39	16	19	4	111	116
Bemidji State	28	11	14	3	25	72	89	38	17	18	3	101	109
Wisconsin	28	11	15	2	24	76	83	37	17	18	2	105	102
Minnesota State	28	8	18	2	18	73	102	38	12	24	2	101	129
Alaska–Anchorage	28	5	22	1	11	60	111	36	9	25	2	85	134
Championship: North Dakota 4, Denver 0 † indicates conference regular season champion; * indicates conference tournament champion Rankings: USCHO.com Top 20 Poll

== 2012 NCAA tournament ==
Regional semifinals
1	Boston College	2
4	Air Force	0
Northeast Regional
2	Minnesota–Duluth	5
3	Maine	2
1	North Dakota	3
4	Western Michigan	1
West Regional
2	Minnesota	7
3	Boston University	3
1	Michigan	2
4	Cornell	3*
Midwest Regional
2	Ferris State	2
3	Denver	1
1	Union	3
4	Michigan State	1
East Regional
2	Miami	3*
3	Massachusetts–Lowell	4

Regional Finals
1	Boston College	4
3	Minnesota–Duluth	0
1	North Dakota	2
2	Minnesota	5
4	Cornell	1
2	Ferris State	2
1	Union	4
3	Massachusetts–Lowell	2

Frozen Four
NE1	Boston College	6
W3	Minnesota	1
MW2	Ferris State	3
E1	Union	1

National championship
E1	Boston College	4
MW2	Ferris State	1

Note: * denotes overtime period(s)

== Player stats ==
=== Scoring leaders ===
GP = Games played; G = Goals; A = Assists; Pts = Points; PIM = Penalty minutes

Player	Class	Team	GP	G	A	Pts	PIM
Spencer Abbott	Senior	Maine	39	21	41	62	34
Jack Connolly	Senior	Minnesota–Duluth	41	20	40	60	28
Austin Smith	Senior	Colgate	39	36	21	57	32
Drew Shore	Junior	Denver	42	22	31	53	45
Travis Oleksuk	Senior	Minnesota–Duluth	41	21	32	53	6
Chris Wagner	Sophomore	Colgate	38	17	34	51	12
Brett Gensler	Sophomore	Bentley	40	23	27	50	38
Mark Zengerle	Sophomore	Wisconsin	37	13	37	50	38
Erik Haula	Sophomore	Minnesota	43	20	29	49	30
Reilly Smith	Junior	Miami	38	30	18	48	22
Brian Flynn	Senior	Maine	40	18	30	48	22

=== Leading goaltenders ===
GP = Games played; Min = Minutes played; W = Wins; L = Losses; T = Ties; GA = Goals against; SO = Shutouts; SV% = Save percentage; GAA = Goals against average

Player	Class	Team	GP	Min	W	L	T	GA	SO	SV%	GAA
Chris Noonan	Senior	Niagara	26	1452:26	14	6	5	39	2	.944	1.61
Troy Grosenick	Sophomore	Union	34	1922:22	22	6	3	53	5	.936	1.65
Parker Milner	Junior	Boston College	34	2055:47	29	5	0	57	3	.937	1.66
Connor Knapp	Senior	Miami	24	1348:51	15	8	0	38	5	.933	1.69
Jason Torf	Sophomore	Air Force	19	1038:07	8	5	2	30	5	.929	1.73
Shane Madolora	Junior	RIT	32	1960:44	18	9	5	63	7	.931	1.93
Shawn Hunwick	Senior	Michigan	40	2400:25	24	12	3	80	5	.932	2.00
Frank Slubowski	Freshman	Western Michigan	32	1923:45	17	11	4	65	3	.911	2.03
Taylor Nelson	Senior	Ferris State	31	1890:03	21	7	3	66	3	.924	2.10
Andy Iles	Sophomore	Cornell	35	2179:51	19	9	7	77	6	.919	2.12

== Awards ==
=== NCAA ===
Award		Recipient
Hobey Baker Award		Jack Connolly, Minnesota–Duluth
Spencer T. Penrose Award		Bob Daniels, Ferris State
National Rookie of the Year		Joey LaLeggia, Denver
Derek Hines Unsung Hero Award		Bobby Farnham, Brown
Lowe's Senior CLASS Award		Jack Connolly, Minnesota–Duluth
Tournament Most Outstanding Player		Parker Milner, Boston College
AHCA All-American Teams
East First Team	Position	West First Team
Troy Grosenick, Union	G	Taylor Nelson, Ferris State
Danny Biega, Harvard	D	Torey Krug, Michigan State
Brian Dumoulin, Boston College	D	Justin Schultz, Wisconsin
Spencer Abbott, Maine	F	Jack Connolly, Minnesota–Duluth
Alex Killorn, Harvard	F	Jaden Schwartz, Colorado College
Austin Smith, Colgate	F	Reilly Smith, Miami
East Second Team	Position	West Second Team
Joe Cannata, Merrimack	G	Kent Patterson, Minnesota
Mathew Bodie, Union	D	Chad Billins, Ferris State
Tim Kirby, Air Force	D	Danny DeKeyser, Western Michigan
Barry Almeida, Boston College	F	Nick Bjugstad, Minnesota
Brian O'Neill, Yale	F	J. T. Brown, Minnesota–Duluth
Jeremy Welsh, Union	F	Jason Zucker, Denver

=== Atlantic Hockey ===
Award		Recipient
Player of the Year		Tim Kirby, Air Force
Best Defensive Forward		Nick Chiavetta, Robert Morris
Best Defenseman		Tim Kirby, Air Force
Rookie of the Year		Alex Grieve, Bentley
Individual Sportsmanship		Mark Cornacchia, Rochester
Regular Season Scoring Trophy		Brett Gensler, Bentley
Regular Season Goaltending Award		Chris Noonan, Niagara
Coach of the Year		Ryan Soderquist, Bentley
Most Valuable Player in Tournament		Jason Torf, Air Force
All-Atlantic Hockey Teams
First Team	Position	Second Team
Shane Madolora, RIT	G	Chris Noonan, Niagara
Tim Kirby, Air Force	D	Alex Gerke, Connecticut
Scott Mathis, Air Force	D	Chris Haltigin, RIT
Kyle De Laurell, Air Force	F	Michael Colavecchia, RIT
Brett Gensler, Bentley	F	John Kruse, Air Force
Cole Schneider, Connecticut	F	Adam Schmidt, Holy Cross
Third Team	Position	Rookie Team
Branden Komm, Bentley	G	Matt Ginn, Holy Cross
Trent Bonnett, Bentley	D	Tyson Wilson, Robert Morris
Nick Jones, Mercyhurst	D	Tyler Shiplo, Mercyhurst
Matt Gingera, Sacred Heart	F	Alex Grieve, Bentley
Adam Pleskach, American International	F	Dan Bahntge, Mercyhurst
Cody Crichton, Robert Morris	F	Brett Switzer, Bentley

=== CCHA ===
Awards		Recipient
Player of the Year		Torey Krug, Michigan State
Best Defensive Forward		Luke Glendening, Michigan
Best Defensive Defenseman		Danny DeKeyser, Western Michigan
Best Offensive Defenseman		Torey Krug, Michigan
Rookie of the Year		Alex Guptill, Michigan
Best Goaltender		Connor Knapp, Miami
Coach of the Year		Bob Daniels, Ferris State
Terry Flanagan Memorial Award		Domenic Monardo, Lake Superior State
Ilitch Humanitarian Award		Cody Reichard, Miami
Perani Cup Champion		Reilly Smith, Miami
Scholar-Athlete of the Year		Chad Billins, Ferris State
Most Valuable Player in Tournament		Frank Slubowski, Western Michigan
All-CCHA Teams
First Team	Position	Second Team
Taylor Nelson, Ferris State	G	Shawn Hunwick, Michigan
Chad Billins, Ferris State	D	Dan DeKeyser, Western Michigan
Torey Krug, Michigan State	D	Matt Tennyson, Western Michigan
Tyler Gron, Northern Michigan	F	Justin Florek, Northern Michigan
Reilly Smith, Miami	F	Jordie Johnston, Ferris State
T. J. Tynan, Notre Dame	F	Cody Kunyk, Alaska
Rookie Team	Position	
Frank Slubowski, Western Michigan	G	
Garrett Haar, Western Michigan	D	
Robbie Russo, Notre Dame	D	
Austin Czarnik, Miami	F	
Alex Guptill, Michigan	F	
Max McCormick, Ohio State	F	

=== ECAC ===
Award		Recipient
Player of the Year		Austin Smith, Colgate
Best Defensive Forward		Kelly Zajac, Union
Best Defensive Defenseman		Danny Biega, Harvard
Rookie of the Year		Brian Ferlin, Cornell
Ken Dryden Award		Troy Grosenick, Union
Tim Taylor Award		Rick Bennett, Union
Student-Athlete of the Year		Keir Ross, Cornell
Most Outstanding Player in Tournament		Jeremy Welsh, Union
All-ECAC Hockey Teams
First Team	Position	Second Team
Troy Grosenick, Union	G	Andy Iles, Cornell
Danny Biega, Harvard	D	Nick D'Agostino, Cornell
Mat Bodie, Union	D	Michael Sdao, Princeton
Alex Killorn, Harvard	F	Jack MacLellan, Brown
Brian O'Neill, Yale	F	Chris Wagner, Colgate
Austin Smith, Colgate	F	Jeremy Welsh, Union
Third Team	Position	Rookie Team
Paul Karpowich, Clarkson	G	Steve Michalek, Harvard
Thomas Larkin, Colgate	D	Patrick McNally, Harvard
Patrick McNally, Harvard	D	Shayne Gostisbehere, Union
Connor Jones, Quinnipiac	F	Matthew Peca, Quinnipiac
Kyle Flanagan, St. Lawrence	F	Brian Ferlin, Cornell
Kelly Zajac, Union	F	Chris Martin, St. Lawrence

=== Hockey East ===
Award		Recipient
Player of the Year		Spencer Abbott, Maine
Rookie of the Year		Scott Wilson, Massachusetts-Lowell
Bob Kullen Coach of the Year Award		Norm Bazin, Massachusetts-Lowell
Len Ceglarski Award		Chris Connolly, Boston University
Best Defensive Forward		Chris Connolly, Boston University
Best Defensive Defenseman		Brian Dumoulin, Boston College
Three-Stars Award		Kieran Millan, Boston University
William Flynn Tournament Most Valuable Player		Johnny Gaudreau, Boston College
All-Hockey East Teams
First Team	Position	Second Team
Joe Cannata, Merrimack	G	Doug Carr, Massachusetts-Lowell
Adam Clendening, Boston University	D	Garrett Noonan, Boston University
Brian Dumoulin, Boston College	D	Karl Stollery, Merrimack
Spencer Abbott, Maine	F	Chris Connolly, Boston University
Barry Almeida, Boston College	F	Joey Diamond, Maine
Brian Flynn, Maine	F	Chris Kreider, Boston College
Rookie Team	Position	
Casey DeSmith, New Hampshire	G	
Zack Kamrass, Massachusetts-Lowell	D	
Alexx Privitera, Boston University	D	
Trevor van Riemsdyk, New Hampshire	D	
Johnny Gaudreau, Boston College	F	
Ross Mauermann, Providence	F	
Ludwig Karlsson, Northeastern	F	
Kyle Reynolds, Vermont	F	
Scott Wilson, Massachusetts-Lowell	F	

=== WCHA ===
Award		Recipient
Player of the Year		Jack Connolly, Minnesota–Duluth
Student-Athlete of the Year		Brad Eidsness, North Dakota
Defensive Player of the Year		Justin Schultz, Wisconsin
Rookie of the Year		Joey LaLeggia, Denver
Scoring Champion		Jack Connolly, Minnesota–Duluth
Goaltending Champion		Kent Patterson, Minnesota
Coach of the Year		Mel Pearson, Michigan Tech
Most Valuable Player in Tournament		Aaron Dell, North Dakota
All-WCHA Teams
First Team	Position	Second Team
Kent Patterson, Minnesota	G	Kenny Reiter, Minnesota–Duluth
Joey LaLeggia, Denver	D	Gabe Guentzel, Colorado College
Justin Schultz, Wisconsin	D	Nate Schmidt, Minnesota
Nick Bjugstad, Minnesota	F	Jaden Schwartz, Colorado College
J. T. Brown, Minnesota–Duluth	F	Drew Shore, Denver
Jack Connolly, Minnesota–Duluth	F	Jason Zucker, Denver
Third Team	Position	Rookie Team
Josh Thorimbert, Colorado College	G	Juho Olkinuora, Denver
Ben Blood, North Dakota	D	Joey LaLeggia, Denver
Nick Jensen, St. Cloud State	D	Andrew Prochno, St. Cloud State
Brock Nelson, North Dakota	F	Jean-Paul LaFontaine, Minnesota State
Travis Oleksuk, Minnesota–Duluth	F	Jayson Megna, Nebraska–Omaha
Mark Zengerle, Wisconsin	F	Kyle Rau, Minnesota

== 2012 NHL entry draft ==
Round	Pick	Player	College	Conference	NHL team
1	9	Jacob Trouba ^{†}	Michigan	CCHA	Winnipeg Jets
1	21	Mark Jankowski ^{†}	Providence	Hockey East	Calgary Flames
1	23	Mike Matheson ^{†}	Boston College	Hockey East	Florida Panthers
1	25	Jordan Schmaltz ^{†}	North Dakota	WCHA	St. Louis Blues
1	28	Brady Skjei ^{†}	Minnesota	WCHA	New York Rangers
2	36	Nic Kerdiles ^{†}	Wisconsin	WCHA	Anaheim Ducks
2	38	Phillip Di Giuseppe	Michigan	CCHA	Carolina Hurricanes
2	44	Jake McCabe	Wisconsin	WCHA	Buffalo Sabres
2	45	Anthony Stolarz ^{†}	Nebraska–Omaha	WCHA	Philadelphia Flyers
2	52	Teddy Blueger ^{†}	Minnesota State	WCHA	Pittsburgh Penguins
2	53	Brian Hart ^{†}	Harvard	ECAC Hockey	Tampa Bay Lightning
2	56	Sam Kurker ^{†}	Boston University	Hockey East	St. Louis Blues
2	59	Boo Nieves ^{†}	Michigan	CCHA	New York Rangers
2	61	Devin Shore ^{†}	Maine	Hockey East	Dallas Stars
3	63	Jujhar Khaira ^{†}	Michigan Tech	WCHA	Edmonton Oilers
3	66	Jimmy Vesey ^{†}	Harvard	ECAC Hockey	Nashville Predators
3	67	Mackenzie MacEachern ^{†}	Michigan State	CCHA	St. Louis Blues
3	68	John Draeger ^{†}	Michigan State	CCHA	Minnesota Wild
3	75	Jon Gillies ^{†}	Providence	Hockey East	Buffalo Sabres
3	85	Matt Grzelcyk ^{†}	Boston University	Hockey East	Boston Bruins
3	78	Shayne Gostisbehere	Union	ECAC Hockey	Philadelphia Flyers
3	79	Chris Calnan ^{†}	Boston College	Hockey East	Chicago Blackhawks
3	86	Colton Parayko ^{†}	Alaska	CCHA	St. Louis Blues
4	97	Kevin Roy ^{†}	Northeastern	Hockey East	Anaheim Ducks
4	98	Adam Gilmour ^{†}	Boston College	Hockey East	Minnesota Wild
4	100	Thomas Di Pauli ^{†}	Notre Dame	CCHA	Washington Capitals
4	102	Rhett Holland ^{†}	Michigan State	CCHA	Phoenix Coyotes
4	106	Tim Boyle ^{†}	Union	ECAC Hockey	Ottawa Senators
4	107	Austin Wuthrich	Notre Dame	CCHA	Washington Capitals
4	112	Zach Stepan ^{†}	Minnesota State	WCHA	Nashville Predators
4	113	Sean Maguire ^{†}	Boston University	Hockey East	Pittsburgh Penguins
4	120	Jaccob Slavin ^{†}	Colorado College	WCHA	Carolina Hurricanes
5	123	Joey LaLeggia	Denver	WCHA	Edmonton Oilers
5	125	Doyle Somerby ^{†}	Boston University	Hockey East	New York Islanders
5	126	Dominic Toninato ^{†}	Minnesota–Duluth	WCHA	Toronto Maple Leafs
5	127	Brian Cooper ^{†}	Nebraska–Omaha	WCHA	Anaheim Ducks
5	129	Brendan Woods	Wisconsin	WCHA	Carolina Hurricanes
5	130	Connor Hellebuyck ^{†}	Massachusetts–Lowell	Hockey East	Winnipeg Jets
5	133	Sean Kuraly ^{†}	Miami	CCHA	San Jose Sharks
5	136	Robbie Baillargeon ^{†}	Boston University	Hockey East	Ottawa Senators
5	138	Danny O'Regan ^{†}	Boston University	Hockey East	San Jose Sharks
5	140	Mike McKee ^{†}	Western Michigan	CCHA	Detroit Red Wings
5	141	Reece Willcox ^{†}	Cornell	ECAC Hockey	Philadelphia Flyers
5	147	Ben Hutton ^{†}	Maine	Hockey East	Vancouver Canucks
5	150	Alexander Kerfoot ^{†}	Harvard	ECAC Hockey	New Jersey Devils
6	153	John McCarron	Cornell	ECAC Hockey	Edmonton Oilers
6	159	Collin Olson ^{†}	Ohio State	CCHA	Carolina Hurricanes
6	167	Riley Barber ^{†}	Miami	CCHA	Washington Capitals
6	168	Cliff Watson ^{†}	Michigan Tech	WCHA	San Jose Sharks
6	169	Vinnie Hinostroza	Notre Dame	CCHA	Chicago Blackhawks
6	170	James de Haas ^{†}	Clarkson	ECAC Hockey	Detroit Red Wings
6	175	Matt Benning ^{†}	Northeastern	Hockey East	Boston Bruins
6	177	Wesley Myron ^{†}	Boston University	Hockey East	Vancouver Canucks
6	178	Hunter Fejes ^{†}	Colorado College	WCHA	Phoenix Coyotes
6	181	Paul LaDue ^{†}	North Dakota	WCHA	Los Angeles Kings
7	183	Dmitry Sinitsyn ^{†}	Massachusetts–Lowell	Hockey East	Dallas Stars
6	185	Jake Bischoff ^{†}	Minnesota	WCHA	New York Islanders
7	186	Matt DeBlouw ^{†}	Michigan State	CCHA	Calgary Flames
7	188	Louis Nanne ^{†}	Rensselaer	ECAC Hockey	Minnesota Wild
7	189	Brendan Collier ^{†}	Boston University	Hockey East	Carolina Hurricanes
7	190	Jamie Phillips ^{†}	Michigan Tech	WCHA	Winnipeg Jets
7	198	Joakim Ryan ^{†}	Cornell	ECAC Hockey	San Jose Sharks
7	199	Matt Tomkins ^{†}	Ohio State	CCHA	Chicago Blackhawks
7	204	Judd Peterson ^{†}	St. Cloud State	WCHA	Buffalo Sabres
7	205	Colton Hargrove ^{†}	Western Michigan	CCHA	Boston Bruins
7	207	Matthew Beattie ^{†}	Yale	ECAC Hockey	Vancouver Canucks
7	210	Jaycob Megna	Nebraska–Omaha	WCHA	Anaheim Ducks

† incoming freshman

== See also ==
- 2011–12 NCAA Division II men's ice hockey season
- 2011–12 NCAA Division III men's ice hockey season
- 2011–12 NCAA Division I women's ice hockey season
