= Gavin Morgan =

Canadian ice hockey player

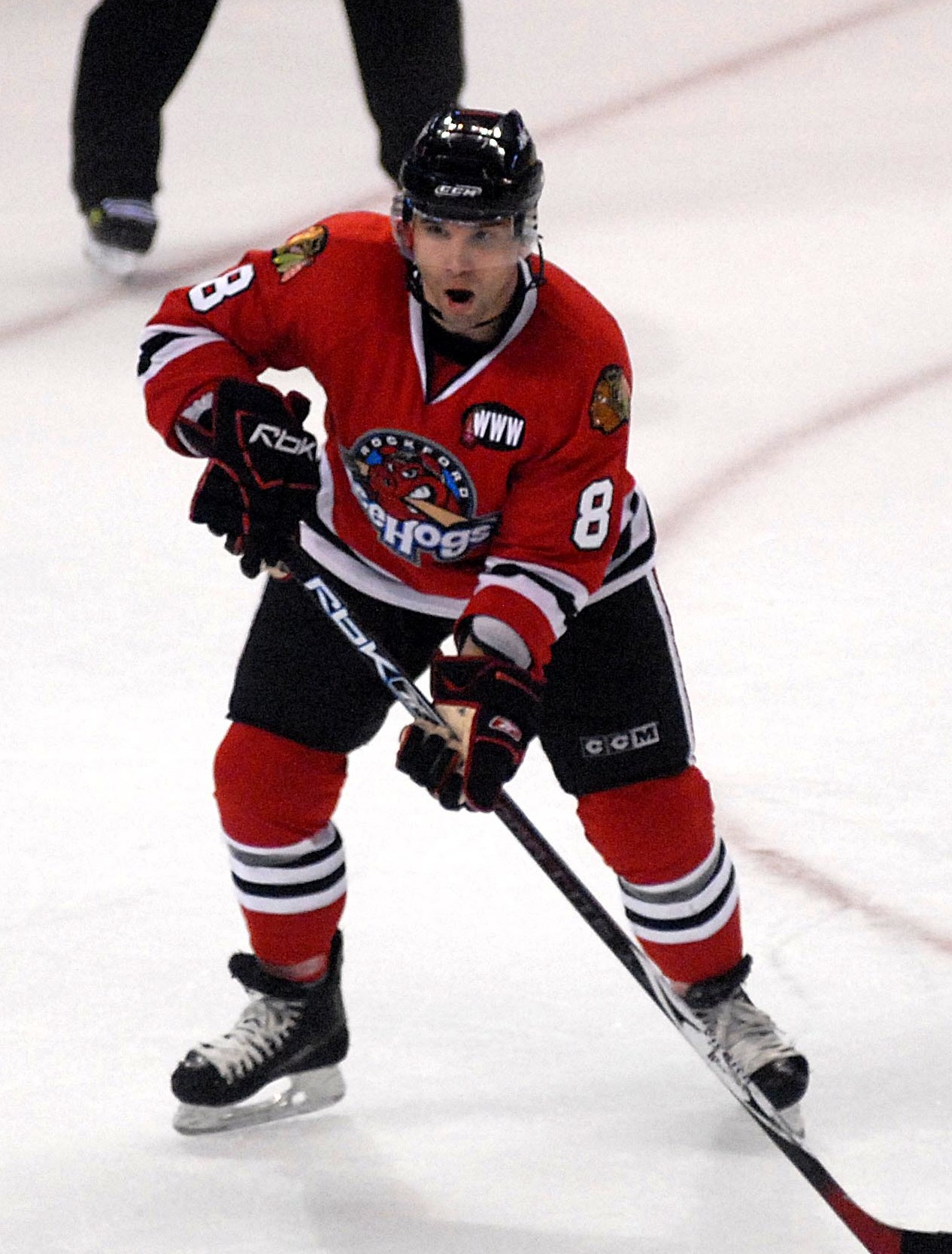
- Morgan with the Rockford IceHogs in 2007
- Born: July 9, 1976 (age 48); Scarborough, Ontario, Canada
- Height: 5 ft 11 in (180 cm)
- Weight: 210 lb (95 kg; 15 st 0 lb)
- Position: Centre
- Shot: Right
- Played for: Vålerenga; Vienna Capitals; EHC Basel; Dallas Stars
- Playing career: 1999–2010

Gavin Morgan (born July 9, 1976) is a Canadian professional ice hockey forward. He played six games in the National Hockey League for the Dallas Stars during the 2003–04 season. The rest of his career, which lasted from 1999 to 2010, was mainly spent in the minor American Hockey League. After his playing career Morgan worked as an assistant coach with the University of Alabama-Huntsville for several years.

== Playing career ==
As a youth, Morgan played in the 1990 Quebec International Pee-Wee Hockey Tournament with the Toronto Marlboros minor ice hockey team.

Morgan started his career with the junior hockey team Wexford Raiders in 1992. He graduated from the University of Denver, where he played four seasons with the Denver Pioneers, in 1999.

Morgan made his professional début in the 1999–00 season, when he split his time between the IHL's Utah Grizzlies, Long Beach Ice Dogs and WCHL's Idaho Steelheads, before earning a regular roster spot with Utah in 2000–01.

He went on to play three seasons with Utah before joining the AHL's Hershey Bears in 2003–04. Even though he spent the majority of the season in Hershey, Morgan made his NHL début, with the Dallas Stars, during the season. He got 21 penalty minutes during his six games in the NHL.

In the summer of 2004 Morgan was acquired by the Montreal Canadiens, but was immediately sent to the AHL and the Hamilton Bulldogs. He played one season for the Bulldogs, before moving to Switzerland and Basel. He went back to the AHL, playing for the Peoria Rivermen and the Rockford IceHogs, in between a short spell at Austrian team Vienna Capitals. In 2008, Morgan joined Norwegian team Vålerenga.

== Coaching career ==
On August 27, 2010, Morgan was named an assistant coach at the University of Alabama in Huntsville.

== Career statistics ==
=== Regular season and playoffs ===
			Regular season					Playoffs
Season	Team	League	GP	G	A	Pts	PIM	GP	G	A	Pts	PIM
1992–93	Wexford Raiders	MetJAHL	3	0	1	1	0	—	—	—	—	—
1993–94	Wexford Raiders	MetJAHL	49	18	32	50	91	—	—	—	—	—
1994–95	Wexford Raiders	MetJAHL	49	26	39	65	170	—	—	—	—	—
1995–96	University of Denver	WCHA	28	2	9	11	47	—	—	—	—	—
1996–97	University of Denver	WCHA	41	8	15	23	46	—	—	—	—	—
1997–98	University of Denver	WCHA	37	9	8	17	42	—	—	—	—	—
1998–99	University of Denver	WCHA	40	13	16	29	85	—	—	—	—	—
1999–00	Idaho Steelheads	WCHL	54	17	33	50	150	3	0	3	3	4
1999–00	Long Beach Ice Dogs	IHL	7	0	1	1	10	—	—	—	—	—
1999–00	Utah Grizzlies	IHL	10	0	2	2	4	2	1	0	1	2
2000–01	Utah Grizzlies	IHL	79	7	14	21	187	—	—	—	—	—
2001–02	Utah Grizzlies	AHL	76	8	24	32	249	5	0	1	1	2
2002–03	Utah Grizzlies	AHL	73	15	24	39	244	2	0	1	1	17
2003–04	Dallas Stars	NHL	6	0	0	0	21	—	—	—	—	—
2003–04	Hershey Bears	AHL	67	10	23	33	152	—	—	—	—	—
2004–05	Hamilton Bulldogs	AHL	76	10	23	33	147	4	0	0	0	6
2005–06	EHC Basel	NLA	10	1	3	4	38	—	—	—	—	—
2005–06	Peoria Rivermen	AHL	73	18	22	40	116	4	0	1	1	6
2006–07	Vienna Capitals	EBEL	24	7	12	19	117	—	—	—	—	—
2006–07	Peoria Rivermen	AHL	54	4	15	19	93	—	—	—	—	—
2007–08	Rockford IceHogs	AHL	47	2	9	11	95	11	1	1	2	24
2008–09	Vålerenga	NOR	39	10	24	34	163	16	0	3	3	28
2009–10	Reading Royals	ECHL	20	2	13	15	30	12	3	4	7	10
2009–10	Hershey Bears	AHL	13	1	1	2	20	—	—	—	—	—
2009–10	San Antonio Rampage	AHL	47	8	9	17	42	—	—	—	—	—
AHL totals			526	76	150	226	1158	26	1	4	5	55
NHL totals			6	0	0	0	21	—	—	—	—	—
