= 2011–12 NCAA Division I men's ice hockey rankings =

- NCAA tournament: 2012
- NCAA champion: Boston College
- Preseason No. 1 (USA Today): Miami
- Preseason No. 1 (USCHO): Notre Dame
- NCAA Division I men's ice hockey rankings

Two human polls made up the 2011–12 NCAA Division I men's ice hockey rankings, the USCHO.com/CBS College Sports poll and the USA Today/USA Hockey Magazine poll. As the 2011–12 season progressed, rankings were updated weekly.

== Legend ==
	Increase in ranking
	Decrease in ranking
	Not ranked previous week
(Italics)	Number of first place votes
#–#–#	Win–loss–tie record
т	Tied with team above or below also with this symbol

== USCHO ==
	Preseason Sep 26	Week 1 Oct 10	Week 2 Oct 17	Week 3 Oct 24	Week 4 Oct 31	Week 5 Nov 7	Week 6 Nov 14	Week 7 Nov 21	Week 8 Nov 28	Week 9 Dec 5	Week 10 Dec 12	Week 11 Dec 19	Week 12 Jan 2	Week 13 Jan 9	Week 14 Jan 16	Week 15 Jan 23	Week 16 Jan 30	Week 17 Feb 6	Week 18 Feb 13	Week 19 Feb 20	Week 20 Feb 27	Week 21 Mar 5	Week 22 Mar 12	Week 23 Mar 19	Final Apr 9	
1.	Notre Dame (45)	Boston College (2–0–0) (36)	Michigan (4–0–0) (24)	Boston College (5–1–0) (32)	Boston College (7–1–0) (42)	Minnesota (9–1–0) (32)	Minnesota (10–2–0) (20)	Merrimack (8–0–1) (27)	Merrimack (9–0–1) (48)	Minnesota–Duluth (11–3–2) (25)	Minnesota–Duluth (12–3–3) (49)	Minnesota–Duluth (12–3–3) (48)	Minnesota–Duluth (12–3–3) (47)	Minnesota–Duluth (14–3–3) (50)	Minnesota–Duluth (15–4–3) (50)	Minnesota–Duluth (17–4–3) (45)	Minnesota–Duluth (17–5–4) (28)	Boston University (16–8–1) (12)	Ferris State (20–8–4) (27)	Ferris State (22–8–4) (36)	Boston College (23–10–1) (44)	Boston College (25–10–1) (50)	Boston College (27–10–1) (50)	Boston College (29–10–1) (50)	Boston College (33–10–1) (50)	1.
2.	Miami (3)	Notre Dame (1–1–0) (7)	Boston College (3–1–0) (15)	Denver (3–1–0) (11)	Colorado College (4–0–0) (5)	Boston College (8–2–0) (15)	Merrimack (8–0–1) (25)	Notre Dame (9–2–2) (10)	Boston College (10–4–0) т (2)	Minnesota (13–4–1) (9)	Minnesota (14–5–1)	Minnesota (14–5–1) (1)	Ohio State (14–4–1) (2)	Ohio State (14–4–3)	Boston University (13–6–1)	Boston University (15–6–1) (5)	Minnesota (19–9–1) (21)	Minnesota (19–9–1) (22)	Boston University (17–9–1) (6)	Boston College (21–10–1) (11)	Minnesota–Duluth (22–7–5) (5)	Ferris State (22–9–5)	Minnesota–Duluth (24–8–6)	Michigan (24–12–4)	Ferris State (26–12–5)	2.
3.	North Dakota (2)	Denver (0–0–0) (2)	Denver (1–1–0) (4)	Colorado College (2–0–0) (4)	Michigan (6–1–1)	Colorado College (5–1–0)	Boston College (9–3–0) (4)	Minnesota (11–3–0) (11)	Notre Dame (10–3–3) т	Boston College (11–5–0) (8)	Boston College (12–6–0)	Boston College (12–6–0)	Minnesota (15–6–1) (1)	Notre Dame (13–6–3)	Boston College (14–8–1)	Minnesota (17–9–1)	Boston University (15–8–1)	Minnesota–Duluth (18–6–4) (10)	Boston College (18–10–1) (13)	Michigan (20–10–4) (3)	Ferris State (22–9–5) (1)	Minnesota–Duluth (22–8–6)	Michigan (23–11–4)	Union (24–7–7)	Union (26–8–7)	3.
4.	Denver	Michigan (3–0–0)	Colorado College (2–0–0) (4)	Michigan (4–1–1)	Western Michigan (5–0–3) (1)	Michigan (7–2–1) (1)	Notre Dame (7–2–2) (1)	Colorado College (7–2–0) (1)	Minnesota–Duluth (9–3–2)	Ohio State (12–3–1) (7)	Ohio State (13–4–1) (1)	Ohio State (13–4–1) (1)	Boston College (13–7–0)	Boston College (13–7–1)	Minnesota (16–8–1)	Notre Dame (14–9–3)	Merrimack (14–5–5)	Michigan (17–9–4) (4)	Minnesota–Duluth (19–7–4) (1)	Minnesota–Duluth (20–7–5)	Boston University (20–11–1) т	Michigan (21–11–4)	Minnesota (26–12–1)	North Dakota (25–12–3)	Minnesota (28–14–1)	4.
5.	Boston College	Miami (1–1–0) (1)	North Dakota (2–1–1)	Notre Dame (3–2–0) (1)	Minnesota (7–1–0)	Western Michigan (6–1–3)	Colorado College (5–2–0)	Boston College (9–4–0) (1)	Minnesota (11–4–1)	Merrimack (9–2–1)	Merrimack (10–2–2)	Notre Dame (11–6–3)	Notre Dame (12–6–3)	Minnesota (15–7–1)	Ohio State (14–6–3)	Merrimack (13–5–5)	Boston College (16–10–1)	Boston College (16–10–1)	Michigan (18–10–4) (1)	Boston University (19–11–1)	Minnesota (23–11–1) т	Minnesota (24–12–1)	Boston University (23–13–1)	Minnesota–Duluth (24–9–6)	North Dakota (26–13–3)	5.
6.	Michigan	North Dakota (1–1–0)	Notre Dame (2–2–0)	Ferris State (6–0–0) (1)	Notre Dame (5–2–0)	Merrimack (7–0–1) (2)	Ferris State (9–2–1)	Minnesota–Duluth (9–3–2)	Ferris State (10–3–1)	Colorado College (8–4–0)	Notre Dame (11–6–3)	Colorado College (11–5–0)	Colorado College (12–6–0)	Boston University (11–6–1)	Merrimack (12–4–5)	Ohio State (14–7–4)	Ferris State (17–8–3) (1)	Ferris State (18–8–4) (1)	Massachusetts–Lowell (19–8–0) (1)	Minnesota (21–11–1)	Michigan (21–11–4)	Boston University (21–12–1)	Union (22–7–7)	Minnesota (26–13–1)	Minnesota–Duluth (25–10–6)	6.
7.	Colorado College	Colorado College (0–0–0)	Boston University (2–1–0) (1)	Western Michigan (3–0–3)	Merrimack (6–0–0)	Notre Dame (5–2–2)	Michigan (7–3–2)	Ferris State (10–3–1)	Ohio State (10–3–1)	Notre Dame (10–5–3) (1)	Colorado College (9–5–0)	Merrimack (10–3–2)	Merrimack (11–3–3)	Merrimack (11–4–4)	Notre Dame (13–8–3)	Boston College (14–10–1)	Michigan (15–9–4)	Massachusetts–Lowell (18–7–0) (1)	Minnesota (19–11–1) (1)	Massachusetts–Lowell (20–9–0)	Union (20–7–7)	Massachusetts–Lowell (22–10–1)	Miami (23–13–2)	Miami (24–14–2)	Michigan (24–13–4)	7.
8.	Minnesota–Duluth	Boston University (2–0–0) (3)	Minnesota (4–0–0) (1)	Minnesota (5–1–0)	Denver (3–2–1)	Ferris State (8–2–0)	Minnesota–Duluth (7–3–2)	Yale (5–1–1)	Colorado College (7–4–0)	Western Michigan (8–4–4)	Western Michigan (9–4–5)	Western Michigan (9–4–5)	Western Michigan (10–5–5)	Colorado College (12–7–1)	Western Michigan (12–7–5)	Michigan (15–9–4)	Notre Dame (15–10–3)	Merrimack (15–6–5)	Union (17–6–7)	Union (19–6–7)	Massachusetts–Lowell (20–10–1)	Union (20–7–7)	Ferris State (23–11–5)	Boston University (23–14–1)	Miami (24–15–2)	8.
9.	Yale	Minnesota–Duluth (1–1–0)	Yale (0–0–0) (1)	Merrimack (4–0–0)	Yale (1–0–1) (1)	Union (5–1–3)	Yale (4–1–1)	Ohio State (10–3–1)	Union (7–3–3)	Ferris State (10–5–1)	Boston University (8–5–1)	Boston University (10–5–1)	Colgate (12–4–2)	Cornell (9–4–2)	Cornell (10–4–3)	Cornell (11–4–4)	Massachusetts–Lowell (16–7–0)	Notre Dame (16–11–3)	Merrimack (15–7–6)	Denver (18–10–4)	Denver (19–11–4)	Denver (21–11–4)	Denver (23–12–4)	Ferris State (23–11–5)	Massachusetts–Lowell (24–13–1)	9.
10.	Boston University	Yale (0–0–0) (1)	Miami (2–2–0)	Yale (0–0–0) (1)	Ferris State (6–2–0)	Minnesota–Duluth (5–3–2)	Western Michigan (6–3–3)	Denver (5–3–3)	Denver (6–4–3)	Union (7–3–5)	Ferris State (10–5–1)	Union (9–3–5)	Boston University (10–6–1)	Western Michigan (10–7–5)	Michigan (14–8–4)	Ferris State (15–8–3)	Ohio State (14–8–5)	Colorado College (15–9–2)	Denver (17–9–4)	Maine (18–10–3)	Maine (19–11–3)	Maine (20–11–3)	Massachusetts–Lowell (23–12–1)	Denver (25–13–4)	Cornell (19–9–7)	10.
11.	Union	Union (1–0–0)	Western Michigan (2–0–2)	Union (2–0–3)	Lake Superior State (7–1–0)	Lake Superior State (8–2–0)	Denver (4–3–2)	Michigan (7–5–2)	Lake Superior State (10–4–2)	Boston University (8–5–1)	Union (7–3–5)	Ferris State (11–6–1)	Denver (10–7–3)	Massachusetts–Lowell (12–5–0)	Colorado College (13–8–1)	Massachusetts–Lowell (14–6–0)	Colorado College (14–9–1) т	Union (16–6–7)	Maine (17–9–3)	Cornell (14–6–7)	Miami (21–13–2)	Miami (21–13–2)	Maine (22–12–3)	Maine (23–13–3)	Boston University (23–15–1)	11.
12.	New Hampshire	Western Michigan (2–0–0)	Union (1–0–2)	North Dakota (2–3–1)	Boston University (3–2–1)	Denver (3–3–2)	Lake Superior State (8–3–1)	Western Michigan (6–4–3)	Western Michigan (6–4–4)	Colgate (11–4–1)	Colgate (11–4–1)	Colgate (11–4–2)	Massachusetts–Lowell (12–5–0)	Colgate (12–6–2)	Union (12–5–6)	Colorado College (14–9–1)	Union (15–6–6) т	Maine (16–8–3)	Cornell (13–6–6)	Merrimack (15–9–6)	Merrimack (16–9–7)	North Dakota (20–12–3)	North Dakota (22–12–3)	Western Michigan (21–13–6)	Denver (25–14–4)	12.
13.	Western Michigan	Merrimack (1–0–0)	Merrimack (2–0–0)	Boston University (2–2–0)	Union (3–1–3)	Yale (2–1–1)	Union (5–3–3)	Lake Superior State (9–3–2) т	Boston University (7–4–1)	Denver (6–5–3)	Cornell (7–3–1)	Cornell (7–3–1)	Cornell (8–4–1)	Ferris State (13–8–1)	Ferris State (14–8–2)	Western Michigan (12–9–5)	Denver (15–8–3)	Cornell (11–6–6)	Notre Dame (16–13–3)	Michigan State (18–12–4)	Cornell (15–7–7)	Cornell (15–7–7)	Cornell (17–7–7)	Massachusetts–Lowell (23–12–1)	Maine (23–14–3)	13.
14.	Omaha	Minnesota (2–0–0)	Ferris State (4–0–0)	Northern Michigan (4–1–1)	Minnesota–Duluth (4–3–1)	Northern Michigan (4–3–3)	Ohio State (8–3–1)	Union (6–3–3) т	Yale (5–3–1)	Michigan State (10–5–1)	Denver (7–6–3)	Michigan State (10–6–2)	Union (9–5–5)	Union (10–5–6)	Massachusetts–Lowell (12–6–0)	Union (13–6–6)	Cornell (11–6–4)	Denver (15–9–4)	North Dakota (16–11–2)	North Dakota (17–11–3)	North Dakota (18–12–3)	Merrimack (17–10–7)	Western Michigan (19–13–6)	Cornell (18–8–7)	Western Michigan (21–14–6)	14.
15.	Merrimack	New Hampshire (0–1–0)	Minnesota–Duluth (1–3–0)	Minnesota–Duluth (2–3–1)	North Dakota (3–4–1)	Michigan Tech (6–3–1)	Michigan Tech (6–3–1)	Boston University (6–4–1)	Colgate (9–4–1)	Lake Superior State (10–6–2)	Michigan State (10–6–2)	Denver (8–7–3)	Michigan State (11–7–2)	Michigan (12–8–4)	Denver (13–8–3)	Denver (13–8–3)	Maine (14–8–3)	Ohio State (14–10–5)	Colorado College (15–11–2)	Miami (19–13–2)	Michigan State (19–13–4)	Michigan State (19–13–4)	Merrimack (18–12–7)	Michigan State (19–15–4)	Michigan State (19–16–4)	15.
16.	Maine	Omaha (1–1–0)	Colgate (3–1–0)	Colgate (3–1–1) т	Michigan Tech (5–2–1)	Boston University (3–3–1)	Boston University (4–4–1)	Colgate (8–4–1)	Michigan State (8–5–1)	Cornell (7–3–1)	Lake Superior State (11–7–2)	Lake Superior State (11–7–2)	Michigan (11–8–3)	Denver (11–8–3)	Michigan State (12–9–3)	Michigan State (13–9–4)	Western Michigan (13–10–5)	North Dakota (15–10–2)	Michigan State (16–12–4)	Colorado College (16–12–2)	Western Michigan (17–13–6)	Western Michigan (17–13–6)	Michigan State (19–15–4)	Air Force (21–10–7)	Air Force (21–11–7)	16.
17.	Wisconsin	Maine (1–1–0)	Northern Michigan (3–1–0)	Miami (2–4–0) т	Northern Michigan (4–3–1)	Dartmouth (3–1–0)	Colgate (6–4–1)	Cornell (5–2–0)	Cornell (6–3–0)	Yale (6–4–1)	Massachusetts–Lowell (10–5–0)	Massachusetts–Lowell (10–5–0)	Ferris State (11–8–1)	North Dakota (11–8–2)	North Dakota (12–9–2)	Miami (14–10–2)	North Dakota (15–10–2)	Michigan State (15–11–4)	Ohio State (15–11–5)	Ohio State (15–11–5)	Northern Michigan (16–12–6)	Notre Dame (19–16–3)	Air Force (19–10–7)	Merrimack (18–12–7)	Merrimack (18–12–7)	17.
18.	Rensselaer	Wisconsin (1–1–0)	Maine (1–2–1)	Lake Superior State (5–1–0)	Colgate (4–2–1)	Colgate (5–3–1)	Cornell (3–2–0)	Michigan Tech (7–4–1)	Miami (8–6–2)	Massachusetts–Lowell (9–4–0)	North Dakota (9–8–1)	North Dakota (9–8–1)	Lake Superior State (12–8–2)	Michigan State (11–9–2)	Colgate (12–8–2)	North Dakota (13–10–2)	Miami (15–11–2)	Western Michigan (14–11–5)	Western Michigan (15–12–5)	Notre Dame (16–15–3)	Notre Dame (17–16–3)	Colorado College (18–14–2)	Notre Dame (19–18–3)	Harvard (13–10–11)	Harvard (13–10–11)	18.
19.	Minnesota	Cornell (0–0–0)	Lake Superior State (4–0–0)	Cornell (0–0–0)	Quinnipiac (6–2–0)	Quinnipiac (7–3–1)	Omaha (6–5–1)	Omaha (6–6–2)	Michigan (7–7–2)	North Dakota (8–7–1)	Yale (6–5–1)	Yale (6–5–1)	North Dakota (10–8–2)	Lake Superior State (12–9–3)	Lake Superior State (13–10–3)	Northern Michigan (11–8–5)	Northern Michigan (12–9–5)	Northern Michigan (12–10–6)	Miami (17–13–2)	Western Michigan (16–13–5)	Colorado College (16–14–2)	Air Force (17–9–7)	Harvard (12–9–11)	Notre Dame (19–18–3)	Notre Dame (19–18–3)	19.
20.	Cornell	Rensselaer (1–1–0)	Cornell (0–0–0)	Quinnipiac (6–2–0)	Maine (3–2–1)	North Dakota (3–6–1)	Northern Michigan (4–5–3)	Michigan State (7–5–0)	Michigan Tech (8–5–1)	Providence (8–6–1)	Michigan (9–8–3)	Michigan (9–8–3)	Yale (7–5–1)	Northern Michigan (10–7–4)	Miami (12–10–2)	Maine (12–8–3)	Colgate (14–9–3)	Miami (15–13–2)	Northern Michigan (14–10–6)	Colgate (16–13–5)	Air Force (17–9–7)	Lake Superior State (18–15–5)	Colgate (19–15–3)	Northern Michigan (17–14–6)	Northern Michigan (17–14–6)	20.
	Preseason Sep 26	Week 1 Oct 10	Week 2 Oct 17	Week 3 Oct 24	Week 4 Oct 31	Week 5 Nov 7	Week 6 Nov 14	Week 7 Nov 21	Week 8 Nov 28	Week 9 Dec 5	Week 10 Dec 12	Week 11 Dec 19	Week 12 Jan 2	Week 13 Jan 9	Week 14 Jan 16	Week 15 Jan 23	Week 16 Jan 30	Week 17 Feb 6	Week 18 Feb 13	Week 19 Feb 20	Week 20 Feb 27	Week 21 Mar 5	Week 22 Mar 12	Week 23 Mar 19	Final Apr 9	
		None	Dropped: New Hampshire; Omaha; Rensselaer; Wisconsin	Dropped: Maine	Dropped: Cornell; Miami	Dropped: Maine	Dropped: Dartmouth; North Dakota; Quinnipiac	Dropped: Northern Michigan	Dropped: Omaha	Dropped: Miami; Michigan; Michigan Tech	Dropped: Providence	None	None	Dropped: Yale	Dropped: Northern Michigan	Dropped: Colgate; Lake Superior State	Dropped: Michigan State	Dropped: Colgate	None	Dropped: Northern Michigan	Dropped: Colgate; Ohio State	Dropped: Northern Michigan	Dropped: Colorado College; Lake Superior State	Dropped: Colgate	None	

== USA Today/USA Hockey Magazine ==
	Preseason Sep 26	Week 1 Oct 10	Week 2 Oct 17	Week 3 Oct 24	Week 4 Oct 31	Week 5 Nov 7	Week 6 Nov 14	Week 7 Nov 21	Week 8 Nov 28	Week 9 Dec 5	Week 10 Dec 12	Week 11 Dec 19	Week 12 Jan 2	Week 13 Jan 9	Week 14 Jan 16	Week 15 Jan 23	Week 16 Jan 30	Week 17 Feb 6	Week 18 Feb 13	Week 19 Feb 20	Week 20 Feb 27	Week 21 Mar 5	Week 22 Mar 12	Week 23 Mar 19	Week 24 Mar 26	Final Apr 9	
1.	Miami (3)	Boston College (2–0–0) (27)	Boston College (3–1–0) (15)	Boston College (5–1–0) (22)	Boston College (7–1–0) (30)	Minnesota (9–1–0) (27)	Minnesota (10–2–0) (14)	Merrimack (8–0–1) (20)	Merrimack (9–0–1) (34)	Minnesota–Duluth (11–3–2) (19)	Minnesota–Duluth (12–3–3) (34)	Minnesota–Duluth (12–3–3) (34)	Minnesota–Duluth (12–3–3) (33)	Minnesota–Duluth (14–3–3) (34)	Minnesota–Duluth (15–4–3) (34)	Minnesota–Duluth (17–4–3) (31)	Minnesota (19–9–1) (18)	Minnesota (19–9–1) (16)	Ferris State (20–8–4) (20)	Ferris State (22–8–4) (28)	Boston College (23–10–1) (31)	Boston College (25–10–1) (34)	Boston College (27–10–1) (34)	Boston College (29–10–1) (34)	Boston College (31–10–1) (34)	Boston College (33–10–1) (34)	1.
2.	Notre Dame (45)	Notre Dame (1–1–0) (3)	Michigan (4–0–0) (12)	Denver (3–1–0) (6)	Colorado College (4–0–0) (3)	Boston College (8–2–0) (6)	Merrimack (8–0–1) (20)	Minnesota (11–3–0) (12)	Notre Dame (10–3–3)	Minnesota (13–4–1) (11)	Minnesota (14–5–1)	Minnesota (14–5–1)	Ohio State (14–4–1) (1)	Ohio State (14–4–3)	Minnesota (16–8–1)	Boston University (15–6–1) (3)	Minnesota–Duluth (17–5–4) (16)	Boston University (16–8–1) (9)	Boston University (17–9–1) (4)	Boston College (21–10–1) (6)	Minnesota–Duluth (22–7–5) (2)	Ferris State (22–9–5)	Minnesota–Duluth (24–8–6)	Michigan (24–12–4)	Minnesota (26–13–1)	Ferris State (26–12–5)	2.
3.	North Dakota (2)	Denver (0–0–0) (2)	Denver (1–1–0) (2)	Colorado College (2–0–0) (3)	Michigan (6–1–1)	Colorado College (5–1–0)	Boston College (9–3–0)	Notre Dame (9–2–2) (2)	Boston College (10–4–0)	Boston College (11–5–0) (3)	Ohio State (13–4–1)	Boston College (12–6–0)	Notre Dame (12–6–3)	Notre Dame (13–6–3)	Boston University (13–6–1)	Minnesota (17–9–1)	Boston University (15–8–1)	Minnesota–Duluth (18–6–4) (8)	Minnesota–Duluth (19–7–4) (3)	Michigan (20–10–4)	Ferris State (22–9–5) (1)	Minnesota–Duluth (22–8–6)	Michigan (23–11–4)	Union (24–7–7)	Union (24–7–7)	Union (26–8–7)	3.
4.	Denver	Miami (1–1–0)	Colorado College (2–0–0) (3)	Michigan (4–1–1) (2)	Notre Dame (5–2–0)	Merrimack (7–0–1) (1)	Notre Dame (7–2–2)	Colorado College (7–2–0)	Minnesota (11–4–1)	Ohio State (12–3–1) (1)	Boston College (12–6–0)	Ohio State (13–4–1)	Boston College (13–7–0)	Boston College (13–7–1)	Boston College (14–8–1)	Notre Dame (14–9–3)	Merrimack (14–5–5)	Boston College (16–10–1)	Boston College (18–10–1) (6)	Minnesota–Duluth (20–7–5)	Boston University (20–11–1)	Minnesota (24–12–1)	Minnesota (26–12–1)	North Dakota (25–12–3)	Ferris State (23–11–5)	Minnesota (28–14–1)	4.
5.	Boston College	Michigan (3–0–0)	Notre Dame (2–2–0)	Notre Dame (3–2–0)	Minnesota (7–1–0)	Michigan (7–2–1)	Colorado College (5–2–0)	Boston College (9–4–0)	Minnesota–Duluth (9–3–2)	Merrimack (9–2–1)	Merrimack (10–2–2)	Colorado College (11–5–0)	Minnesota (15–6–1)	Minnesota (15–7–1)	Ohio State (14–6–3)	Merrimack (13–5–5)	Boston College (16–10–1)	Ferris State (18–8–4) (1)	Michigan (18–10–4) (1)	Minnesota (21–11–1)	Minnesota (23–11–1)	Michigan (21–11–4)	Boston University (23–13–1)	Minnesota–Duluth (24–9–6)	North Dakota (25–12–3)	Minnesota–Duluth (25–10–6)	5.
6.	Boston University	North Dakota (1–1–0)	North Dakota (2–1–1)	Yale (0–0–0) (1)	Western Michigan (5–0–3)	Western Michigan (6–1–3)	Ferris State (9–2–1)	Minnesota–Duluth (9–3–2)	Ferris State (10–3–1)	Colorado College (8–4–0)	Notre Dame (11–6–3)	Notre Dame (11–6–3)	Merrimack (11–3–3)	Boston University (11–6–1)	Notre Dame (13–8–3)	Cornell (11–4–4)	Notre Dame (15–10–3)	Michigan (17–9–4)	Massachusetts–Lowell (19–8–0)	Boston University (19–11–1)	Michigan (21–11–4)	Boston University (21–12–1)	Union (22–7–7)	Minnesota (26–13–1)	Minnesota–Duluth (24–9–6)	North Dakota (26–13–3)	6.
7.	Colorado College	Boston University (2–0–0) (1)	Miami (2–2–0)	Ferris State (6–0–0)	Merrimack (6–0–0)	Notre Dame (5–2–2)	Michigan (7–3–2)	Ferris State (10–3–1)	Ohio State (10–3–1)	Notre Dame (10–5–3) (1)	Colorado College (9–5–0)	Merrimack (10–3–2)	Colgate (12–4–2)	Merrimack (11–4–4)	Merrimack (12–4–5)	Ohio State (14–7–4)	Ferris State (17–8–3)	Massachusetts–Lowell (18–7–0)	Minnesota (19–11–1)	Massachusetts–Lowell (20–9–0)	Union (20–7–7)	Union (20–7–7)	Ferris State (23–11–5)	Miami (24–14–2)	Michigan (24–12–4)	Michigan (24–13–4)	7.
8.	Yale	Colorado College (0–0–0)	Boston University (2–1–0) (1)	Minnesota (5–1–0)	Denver (3–2–1)	Ferris State (8–2–0)	Minnesota–Duluth (7–3–2)	Yale (5–1–1)	Colorado College (7–4–0)	Western Michigan (8–4–4)	Western Michigan (9–4–5)	Western Michigan (9–4–5)	Colorado College (12–6–0)	Colorado College (12–7–1)	Western Michigan (12–7–5)	Boston College (14–10–1)	Michigan (15–9–4)	Merrimack (15–6–5)	Union (17–6–7)	Union (19–6–7)	Massachusetts–Lowell (20–10–1)	Massachusetts–Lowell (22–10–1)	Miami (23–13–2)	Ferris State (23–11–5)	Cornell (18–8–7)	Denver (25–14–4)	8.
9.	Michigan	Minnesota–Duluth (1–1–0)	Yale (0–0–0) (1)	Merrimack (4–0–0)	Yale (1–0–1) (1)	Union (5–1–3)	Yale (4–1–1)	Denver (5–3–3)	Union (7–3–3)	Union (7–3–5)	Boston University (8–5–1)	Boston University (10–5–1)	Western Michigan (10–5–5)	Cornell (9–4–2)	Cornell (10–4–3)	Michigan (15–9–4)	Massachusetts–Lowell (16–7–0)	Notre Dame (16–11–3)	Merrimack (15–7–6)	Cornell (14–6–7)	Miami (21–13–2)	Denver (21–11–4)	Denver (23–12–4)	Denver (25–13–4)	Massachusetts–Lowell (23–12–1)	Massachusetts–Lowell (24–13–1)	9.
10.	Minnesota–Duluth	Yale (0–0–0) (1)	Minnesota (4–0–0)	Western Michigan (3–0–3)	Ferris State (6–2–0)	Yale (2–1–1)	Western Michigan (6–3–3)	Ohio State (10–3–1)	Denver (6–4–3)	Ferris State (10–5–1)	Colgate (11–4–1)	Union (9–3–5)	Denver (10–7–3)	Massachusetts–Lowell (12–5–0)	Michigan (14–8–4)	Colorado College (14–9–1)	Ohio State (14–8–5)	Colorado College (15–9–2)	Denver (17–9–4)	Denver (18–10–4)	Denver (19–11–4)	Maine (20–11–3)	Massachusetts–Lowell (23–12–1) т	Boston University (23–14–1)	Denver (25–13–4)	Miami (24–15–2)	10.
11.	Union	Union (1–0–0)	Union (1–0–2)	Union (2–0–3)	Union (3–1–3)	Lake Superior State (8–2–0)	Denver (4–3–2)	Michigan (7–5–2)	Lake Superior State (10–4–2)	Colgate (11–4–1)	Ferris State (10–5–1)	Colgate (11–4–2)	Boston University (10–6–1)	Western Michigan (10–7–5)	Colorado College (13–8–1)	Massachusetts–Lowell (14–6–0)	Colorado College (14–9–1)	Union (16–6–7)	Maine (17–9–3)	Maine (18–10–3)	Maine (19–11–3)	Miami (21–13–2)	Maine (22–12–3) т	Maine (23–13–3)	Boston University (23–14–1)	Boston University (23–15–1)	11.
12.	New Hampshire	Western Michigan (2–0–0)	Western Michigan (2–0–2)	Boston University (2–2–0)	Boston University (3–2–1)	Denver (3–3–2)	Union (5–3–3)	Union (6–3–3)	Western Michigan (6–4–4)	Boston University (8–5–1)	Union (7–3–5)	Ferris State (11–6–1)	Massachusetts–Lowell (12–5–0)	Ferris State (13–8–1)	Union (12–5–6)	Ferris State (15–8–3)	Union (15–6–6)	Maine (16–8–3)	Cornell (13–6–6)	North Dakota (17–11–3)	Merrimack (16–9–7)	North Dakota (20–12–3)	North Dakota (22–12–3)	Western Michigan (21–13–6)	Maine (23–13–3)	Maine (23–14–3)	12.
13.	Western Michigan	Merrimack (1–0–0)	Merrimack (2–0–0)	North Dakota (2–3–1)	Lake Superior State (7–1–0)	Minnesota–Duluth (5–3–2)	Lake Superior State (8–3–1)	Western Michigan (6–4–3)	Boston University (7–4–1)	Denver (6–5–3)	Denver (7–6–3)	Cornell (7–3–1)	Michigan (11–8–3)	Union (10–5–6)	Massachusetts–Lowell (12–6–0)	Union (13–6–6)	Denver (15–8–3)	Cornell (11–6–6)	Notre Dame (16–13–3)	Merrimack (15–9–6)	Cornell (15–7–7)	Cornell (15–7–7)	Cornell (17–7–7)	Massachusetts–Lowell (23–12–1)	Miami (24–14–2)	Cornell (19–9–7)	13.
14.	Omaha	Minnesota (2–0–0)	Colgate (3–1–0)	Northern Michigan (4–1–1)	Minnesota–Duluth (4–3–1)	Dartmouth (3–1–0)	Ohio State (8–3–1)	Lake Superior State (9–3–2)	Colgate (9–4–1)	Michigan State (10–5–1)	Michigan State (10–6–2)	Michigan State (10–6–2)	Cornell (8–4–1)	Colgate (12–6–2)	Ferris State (14–8–2)	Western Michigan (12–9–5)	Cornell (11–6–4)	Denver (15–9–4)	Colorado College (15–11–2)	Michigan State (18–12–4)	Michigan State (19–13–4)	Merrimack (17–10–7)	Western Michigan (19–13–6)	Cornell (18–8–7)	Western Michigan (21–13–6)	Western Michigan (21–14–6)	14.
15.	Maine	Omaha (1–1–0)	Minnesota–Duluth (1–3–0)	Minnesota–Duluth (2–3–1)	North Dakota (3–4–1)	Northern Michigan (4–3–3)	Michigan Tech (6–3–1)	Colgate (8–4–1)	Yale (5–3–1)	Lake Superior State (10–6–2)	Cornell (7–3–1)	Denver (8–7–3)	Michigan State (11–7–2)	Michigan (12–8–4)	Denver (13–8–3)	Denver (13–8–3)	Maine (14–8–3)	North Dakota (15–10–2)	North Dakota (16–11–2)	Miami (19–13–2)	North Dakota (18–12–3)	Michigan State (19–13–4)	Merrimack (18–12–7)	Michigan State (19–15–4)	Air Force (21–11–7)	Air Force (21–11–7)	15.
	Preseason Sep 26	Week 1 Oct 10	Week 2 Oct 17	Week 3 Oct 24	Week 4 Oct 31	Week 5 Nov 7	Week 6 Nov 14	Week 7 Nov 21	Week 8 Nov 28	Week 9 Dec 5	Week 10 Dec 12	Week 11 Dec 19	Week 12 Jan 2	Week 13 Jan 9	Week 14 Jan 16	Week 15 Jan 23	Week 16 Jan 30	Week 17 Feb 6	Week 18 Feb 13	Week 19 Feb 20	Week 20 Feb 27	Week 21 Mar 5	Week 22 Mar 12	Week 23 Mar 19	Week 24 Mar 26	Final Apr 9	
		Dropped: Maine; New Hampshire	Dropped: Omaha	Dropped: Colgate; Miami	Dropped: Northern Michigan	Dropped: Boston University; North Dakota	Dropped: Dartmouth; Northern Michigan	Dropped: Michigan Tech	Dropped: Michigan	Dropped: Yale	Dropped: Lake Superior State	None	Dropped: Union	Dropped: Denver; Michigan State	Dropped: Colgate	None	Dropped: Western Michigan	Dropped: Ohio State	None	Dropped: Colorado College; Notre Dame	None	None	Dropped: Michigan State	Dropped: Merrimack	Dropped: Michigan State	None	
