= 2011–12 Michigan Tech Huskies men's ice hockey season =

- Conference: WCHA
- Home ice: MacInnes Student Ice Arena

Rankings
- USA Today/USA Hockey Magazine: not ranked
- USCHO.com/CBS College Sports: not ranked

Record
- Overall: 16–19–4
- Home: 9–6–2
- Road: 7–10–2
- Neutral: 0–3–0

Coaches and captains
- Head coach: Mel Pearson
- Assistant coaches: Bill Muckalt; Damon Whitten; Steve Shields
- Captain: Brett Olson
- Alternate captain(s): Jordan Baker; Carl Nielsen; Steven Seigo

The 2011–12 Michigan Tech Huskies men's ice hockey team represented Michigan Technological University in the 2011–12 NCAA Division I men's ice hockey season. The team was coached by Mel Pearson, a 1981 Michigan Tech alumnus in his first season as a head coach after spending the past 23 seasons as an assistant/associate coach for the Michigan Wolverines. The Huskies played their home games at the MacInnes Student Ice Arena on the campus of Michigan Tech in Houghton, Michigan, and compete in the Western Collegiate Hockey Association (WCHA).

Michigan Tech enters the 2011–12 season after winning 4 of their 38 games the previous season. The team's 4–30–4 record led to the resignation of head coach Jamie Russell shortly after the season's completion. Mel Pearson was hired as Russell's replacement in May.

== Offseason coaching change ==
Jamie Russell, Michigan Tech's eighth-year head coach, resigned following the 2010–11 season, in which the Huskies won 4 games and endured a 26‑game winless streak. "The best memories are of the players and the guys I've worked with, that's what I'll remember", Russell said. "Successes, obviously, there weren't enough of them." Russell accepted an assistant coaching position with Providence a few months later. Michigan Tech athletic director Suzanne Sanregret began searching for Russell's replacement immediately after his resignation, saying university president Glenn Mroz gave her the authority and many alumni gave her the resources to "go after the best coach". Among Sanregret's interviewees were Michigan Tech alumnus and Michigan associate coach Mel Pearson, Nebraska–Omaha associate coach Mike Hastings and Green Bay (USHL) head coach Eric Rud. Pearson's interview took place four days after his team lost the NCAA Division I national championship game to Minnesota–Duluth, and when Sanregret gave him 48 hours to decide whether to accept the position, he ultimately could not say yes. "[W]ith everything going on, it was just a tough time to make ... a life-changing decision", Pearson said. "So I just think I went with the safe way and said no".

Sanregret continued the search after Pearson turned down the job, but she met with Pearson again in early May at the American Hockey Coaches Association convention in Naples, Florida, and this time he was ready to accept. Pearson signed a five-year contract and was introduced at the Grant Hockey Educational Center on Michigan Tech's campus on May 10. At the press conference, Pearson posited that what separates him from the previous alumni who have returned to coach the Huskies is his 30 years of experience. "As you're in the game longer you get a bigger network of people who can help you recruit, so I think that's the biggest difference right now", Pearson said. Bill Muckalt, a veteran of five National Hockey League (NHL) seasons who was coached by Pearson at Michigan, was hired as an assistant coach in June; Damon Whitten was retained as the other assistant coach. "Our coaching staff has done a lot of winning and we want to instill the attitude that we're going to win", Whitten said. Pearson spoke of changing the team's style of play to emphasize skill, speed and offensive creativity, and said his staff's efforts would be focused on recruiting for the next few months. He brought in Steve Shields, another former NHL player who played under Pearson at Michigan, as a volunteer goaltending coach in September.

== Recruiting ==
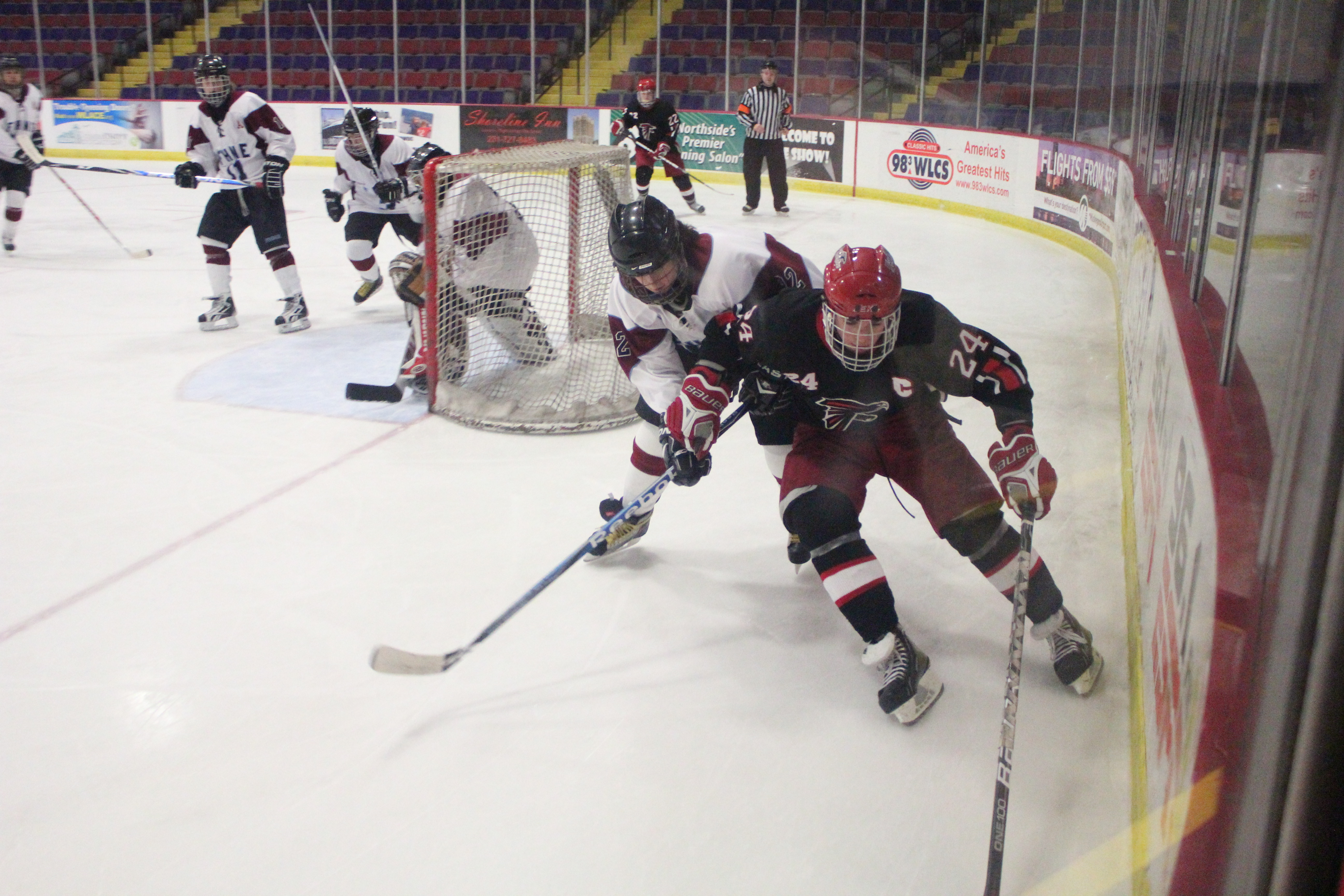
Jimmy Davis (shown wearing black jersey) became Mel Pearson's first recruit a few months after Pearson became head coach.

Most of Michigan Tech's incoming freshmen for the 2011–12 season had been recruited and verbally committed during Jamie Russell's tenure. The first was forward Tanner Kero, whose hometown of Hancock, Michigan, is across Portage Lake from Michigan Tech. Kero committed in late 2009 while a member of the Marquette Rangers of the North American Hockey League (NAHL). He spent the 2010–11 season with the Fargo Force of the United States Hockey League (USHL) and was named to the USHL Western Conference All-Star Team while scoring 37 points in 55 games. Defenseman Nick Cecere committed to play at Nebraska–Omaha while a member of Northwood School's "Junior Team", but switched to Michigan Tech after a coaching change at Nebraska–Omaha. Explaining why he chose Michigan Tech, Cecere said, "Since I've been in prep school, I'm used to a smaller, close-knit community, and that's what I like. ... I fell in love with [Michigan Tech], and my parents did as well". Indiana Ice (USHL) forward David Johnstone, brother of Michigan Tech sophomore forward Jacob Johnstone, committed two months later. Justin Fillion, who was in his third season with the Prince George Spruce Kings of the British Columbia Hockey League (BCHL), also committed in December. He credited his coach, former Michigan Tech player Ed Dempsey, with helping him earn the scholarship that Tech offered. Blake Pietila, a forward with the USA Hockey National Team Development Program, originally committed to Northern Michigan, but switched when his older brother Chad decided to transfer from Northern Michigan to Michigan Tech. Blake was drafted by the New Jersey Devils with the 129th pick of the 2011 NHL entry draft, becoming Michigan Tech's first drafted player since Jordan Foote was selected in 2004.

Two recruits decommitted after Russell's resignation. Sam Labrecque, a defenseman with the Nanaimo Clippers (BCHL), had committed to Michigan Tech in October 2010, but switched to Clarkson. Andrew Kolb, a forward with the Michigan Warriors (NAHL), instead joined Division III Wisconsin–Stevens Point.

The new coaching staff spent much of the summer recruiting for 2011–12 and beyond. Pearson spotted defenseman Jimmy Davis at a June tryout camp for the Muskegon Lumberjacks, a USHL team for which Davis was trying to earn a roster spot after two all-state seasons with East Kentwood High School, and Davis accepted his scholarship offer. Michigan Tech's recruiting of defenseman Riley Sweeney, who played for the Surrey Eagles (BCHL), began during the Jamie Russell era, and he ultimately committed after speaking with Bill Muckalt at a hockey camp in July. The final addition of Sweeney meant eight players joined the team for the 2011–12 season. Six of those players were available at the start of the season; until the end of the fall semester, however, Chad Pietila was not eligible to play in any games and Fillion was not eligible to join the team.

2011–12 incoming players
Player	Position	St/Pr/Co	Hometown	Previous team	Notes
Nick Cecere	Defense	(Iowa)	Des Moines, Iowa	Lincoln (USHL)	7 assists in 58 games with Lincoln in 2010–11
Jimmy Davis	Defense	(Michigan)	Caledonia, Michigan	East Kentwood (USHS–MI)	Two-time all-state defenseman at East Kentwood
Justin Fillion	Defense	(British Columbia)	Prince George, British Columbia	Victoria (BCHL)	30 goals and 93 assists in 178 career BCHL games
David Johnstone	Forward	(Michigan)	Grand Ledge, Michigan	Indiana (USHL)	58 points in 57 games with Indiana in 2010–11
Tanner Kero	Forward	(Michigan)	Hancock, Michigan	Fargo (USHL)	USHL Western Conference All-Star Team in 2010–11
Blake Pietila	Forward	(Michigan)	Milford, Michigan	US NTDP (USHL)	Drafted 129th overall by New Jersey in the 2011 NHL entry draft
Chad Pietila	Forward	(Michigan)	Milford, Michigan	Northern Michigan (CCHA)	3 goals and 4 assists in 39 career games at Northern Michigan
Riley Sweeney	Defense	(British Columbia)	Delta, British Columbia	Surrey (BCHL)	14 goals and 47 assists in 113 career BCHL games

== Season events ==
=== Preseason ===
The NCAA ice hockey season began on September 15, and head coach Mel Pearson held a practice that day with assistance from goaltending coach Steve Shields while the other assistant coaches were on recruiting trips. Practices continued four days a week, though the coaches were only allowed on the ice two hours a week through September. The results of a WCHA preseason poll were released in late September, and while Pearson finished second place in voting for coach of the year, the team was picked to finish in last place in the standings. Senior captain Brett Olson said, "We're definitely not a last place team.... With everything that's been set in place, attitude and everything, we're definitely going to be contending". Heading into an October 1 exhibition game at home against the Lakehead Thunderwolves, Pearson planned to use at least two goaltenders and prepared his team to play the "up-tempo, aggressive, puck control style that has been the focus of practices so far". The intent was that aggressive backchecking and outnumbering opposition forwards would lead to more turnovers and therefore more offensive chances. The Huskies won the game against Lakehead 5–3 after coming back from 1–2 and 2–3 deficits. Sophomore forward Jacob Johnstone scored a hat trick, and senior goaltender Josh Robinson played the entire game after Shields recommended leaving him in to see how he responded to playing from behind. Pearson cut defenseman Ricky Doriott and forwards Alan L'Esperance and Evan Witt from the roster the following Monday.

=== Regular season ===
==== October ====
The regular season opened on October 7 with a two-game series against visiting American International. Pearson sought to improve the team's defensive zone coverage in practices before the series, but starting goaltender Kevin Genoe gave up three goals in the first period while his Yellow Jackets counterpart, Ben Meisner, stopped all eight Huskies shots. The Huskies' comeback began late in the second period when Blake Pietila's pass deflected off a defender's skate past Meisner. In the third period, goals from Pietila, Steven Seigo and Jordan Baker completed Michigan Tech's 5–3 comeback win. Genoe stopped all 14 shots he faced in the final two periods. In the following night's rematch, Robinson started at goaltender and the Huskies scored first after Riley Sweeney's pass sent Brett Olson on a shorthanded breakaway and Meisner failed to stop Olson's high shot. The Yellow Jackets, however, tied the game 31 seconds later while the Huskies were still shorthanded. Pearson had inserted Mikael Lickteig in the lineup for this game, hoping his speed would be beneficial, and it paid off when Lickteig created a scoring chance for himself that Meisner stopped, but Jacob Johnstone scored on the rebound. In the second period, Johnstone found a loose puck immediately in front of Meisner and made "three quick stick-handling moves for a highlight-reel goal", and the Huskies won 3–1. Robinson stopped 32 of 33 shots, and Pearson called him "the difference in the game". The series sweep was the Huskies' first since December 19–20, 2008, against Northern Michigan. Pietila was named Western Collegiate Hockey Association (WCHA) Rookie of the Week for his two-goal performance in the series' first game.

Michigan Tech hosted Wisconsin for a two-game series the following weekend to open its WCHA conference schedule, but did so without junior defenseman Tommy Brown, who underwent an appendectomy that week. Pearson wanted his team to play with more discipline so as to limit the Badgers' power play chances, and the Huskies responded by taking one penalty through the first two periods of the Friday game. Michigan Tech freshman Tanner Kero opened the scoring in the second period with his first career goal by deflecting a shot from Riley Sweeney. In the third period, however, the Huskies incurred two consecutive penalties in the first seven minutes, and Wisconsin forward Tyler Barnes beat Josh Robinson for a power play goal. The Huskies outshot the Badgers 16–8 in the third period, but could not put the puck past Landon Peterson to win the game in regulation. Nearly three minutes into the overtime period, Michigan Tech started a dump-and-chase and Peterson stopped the puck behind his net, but he collided with teammate John Ramage while the Huskies forechecked, leaving Jordan Baker to score on an undefended goal and win the game. In the Saturday game, Wisconsin started Joel Rumpel at goaltender and Huskies forwards Kero and Blake Pietila each scored a power play goal on a deflection. Midway through the second period, Wisconsin scored off a rebound after Robinson stopped the initial shot. Michigan Tech killed off a five-minute major penalty to Alex MacLeod in the third period, but the Badgers tied the game with two minutes remaining. Twenty seconds into overtime, however, Huskies captain Brett Olson scored on a wrap-around shot that went through Rumpel's five-hole for the win. Pearson was pleased with his team's performance, saying, "Our kids are working hard, there's a lot of good things going on in our locker room and we see it every day as coaches". Robinson was named WCHA Defensive Player of the Week after stopping 44 of 47 shots in the series.

The Huskies traveled to Bemidji State for a pair of games on October 21–22 and anticipated employing "better puck control and discipline, while maintaining a fast-paced, aggressive style that better capitalizes on offensive opportunities and limits opposing scoring chances". Josh Robinson started on Friday and surrendered an early goal to Beavers captain Ben Kinne, but Michigan Tech responded with goals from Carl Nielsen, David Johnstone and Blake Pietila in a seven-minute span. After Bemidji State replaced starting goaltender Dan Bakala with Andrew Walsh, the Beavers scored three more goals to end the first period with a 4–3 lead. Bemidji State added two more goals by the midway point of the third period, but Alex MacLeod scored off a rebound and Steven Seigo scored on a shot "through traffic" to reduce the lead to one goal. Pearson substituted an extra skater for Robinson late in the game, but the Huskies were unable to score on either of the scoring opportunities they generated and lost the game 6–5. Kevin Genoe started at goaltender for Michigan Tech in the Saturday game. MacLeod opened the scoring in the first period on one of the Huskies' 12 shots. Michigan Tech took five penalties in the second period, and the Beavers converted on two of the power play opportunities. Drew Fisher scored Bemidji State's third goal of the game 12 minutes into the third period, and Walsh stopped the rest of Michigan Tech's shots to earn the victory. The Huskies outshot the Beavers 32–16.

The #2-ranked Denver Pioneers, a team Pearson said "[has] more balance and ... experience than the three teams we've seen so far", visited Michigan Tech the last weekend of October. The teams traded goals in the opening minutes of the Friday game, then Huskies forwards Milos Gordic, who played in his first two games of the year after recovering from shoulder surgery, and Ryan Furne scored 16 seconds apart midway through the first period. Furne collided with and injured Denver goaltender Adam Murray after scoring, forcing coach George Gwozdecky to substitute Juho Olkinuora. In the second period, Gordic scored a power play goal and Josh Robinson stopped all 21 Pioneers shots. Gwozdecky pulled Olkinuora with seven minutes left in the game, and Gordic completed his hat trick on an empty net a minute later. The Denver goal remained undefended for a few more minutes – "to try to work on our six-on-five situations", Gwozdecky said – and Brett Olson and Dennis Rix scored on the empty net. Denver added a late goal for a 7–2 final score. Robinson stopped 38 of 40 shots. The next evening, Gordic and Denver forward Jason Zucker traded goals in an "open, fast-paced first period [that] gave way to a choppy, penalty-filled second period". The Pioneers took the lead on a second-period power play, then Olson beat Olkinuora off a rebound in the third period. The game went to overtime, but Tanner Kero was unable to convert either of two scoring opportunities late in the five-minute period. Michigan Tech earned three of four possible points with the win and tie, and Gordic and Robinson were named WCHA Offensive and Defensive Player of the Week, respectively. Pearson said after the series, "If we [continue to] play like that we're going to win a lot of hockey games."

==== November ====
The Huskies, with a 5–2–1 record to this point, entered their November 4–5 home series against Minnesota State ranked #16 in the USCHO.com poll. It was the first time the team had been nationally ranked in four years. The first game turned into a "battle [between] two hot goaltenders", and the only goal occurred on a Michigan Tech power play when Ryan Furne's 90‑foot shot toward Mavericks goaltender Austin Lee "took a strange hop just outside the crease" and crossed the goal line. Minnesota State failed to score on six power play opportunities and Josh Robinson stopped all 29 shots. In the second game, Huskies goals from Jacob Johnstone, Blake Pietila and Tanner Kero were matched by Minnesota State, and the game was tied 3–3 after two periods. The Mavericks took advantage of Michigan Tech's penalties and sloppy defensive play in the third period and scored two more goals against Josh Robinson, plus an empty-net goal, to win the game 6–3. "It's tough to lose at home like that, but we're going into an off week, and we have a lot of time to fix things we need to get better at", said Brett Olson.

After an off-week, Michigan Tech traveled to Alaska–Anchorage for games on November 18 and 19. Junior defenseman Carl Nielsen stayed home to recover from a concussion sustained in the team's previous game, and with three freshmen defensemen in the lineup, Pearson stressed defensive zone coverage in practice sessions before the series. Kevin Genoe started at goaltender in the Friday game and gave up one goal in each period. Sophomore defenseman Bradley Stebner scored his first collegiate goal, and the Huskies' only goal of the game, on a 4-on-3 attack late in the second period. Five or six of the 19 shots generated by Michigan Tech were "quality chances" according to Alaska–Anchorage coach Dave Shyiak, and Seawolves defenseman Corbin Karl said it was "the most complete game" his team had played to that point in the season. In the Saturday game, Josh Robinson started at goaltender and earned his second shutout of the season while stopping 23 shots. On the offensive side, the Huskies capitalized on numerous defensive mistakes by the Seawolves. Blake Pietila scored after Michigan Tech forced a turnover inside the Alaska–Anchorage zone. Jordan Baker was left undefended and scored on a rebound. Ryan Furne was similarly left alone in front of the goal before he scored. Milos Gordic and Jacob Johnstone also scored for the Huskies in their 5–0 win.

== Roster ==
=== Departures from 2010–11 team ===
- Deron Cousens, D – graduation
- Ricky Doriott, D – cut during 2011–12 preseason
- Alan L'Esperance, F – cut during 2011–12 preseason
- Bennett Royer, F – graduation
- Evan Witt, F – cut during 2011–12 preseason

=== 2011–12 roster ===
No.	Nat.	Player	Class	Pos	Height	Weight	DoB	Hometown	Previous team	NHL rights
2		Pete Heinonen	Junior	D	5' 10" (1.78 m)	185 lb (84 kg)	1989-09-08	Hancock, Michigan	Hancock (USHS–MI)	—
3		Bradley Stebner	Sophomore	D	6' 4" (1.93 m)	210 lb (95 kg)	1990-01-21	Fort McMurray, Alberta	Fort McMurray (AJHL)	—
4		Nick Cecere	Freshman	D	6' 0" (1.83 m)	190 lb (86 kg)	1990-10-12	Des Moines, Iowa	Lincoln (USHL)	—
5		Justin Fillion	Freshman	D	5' 11" (1.8 m)	180 lb (82 kg)	1990-04-23	Prince George, British Columbia	Victoria (BCHL)	—
6		Steven Seigo (A)	Junior	D	6' 0" (1.83 m)	185 lb (84 kg)	1990-08-01	Edenwold, Saskatchewan	Bonnyville (AJHL)	—
7		Patrick McCadden	Sophomore	F	6' 0" (1.83 m)	190 lb (86 kg)	1989-02-20	Chesterfield, Missouri	Green Bay (USHL)	—
8		Jacob Johnstone	Sophomore	F	5' 11" (1.8 m)	190 lb (86 kg)	1990-05-13	Grand Ledge, Michigan	Sioux Falls (USHL)	—
9		Dennis Rix	Sophomore	F	6' 0" (1.83 m)	190 lb (86 kg)	1989-08-05	Grande Prairie, Alberta	Grande Prairie (AJHL)	—
10		Tanner Kero	Freshman	F	5' 11" (1.8 m)	175 lb (79 kg)	1992-07-24	Hancock, Michigan	Fargo (USHL)	—
11		Daniel Holmberg	Sophomore	F	6' 4" (1.93 m)	215 lb (98 kg)	1990-07-11	Nyköping, Sweden	Linköping J20 (J20 SuperElit)	—
12		Ryan Furne	Sophomore	F	6' 2" (1.88 m)	215 lb (98 kg)	1989-12-12	Oakdale, Minnesota	Green Bay (USHL)	—
13		Aaron Pietila	Junior	F	6' 0" (1.83 m)	195 lb (88 kg)	1988-06-23	Brighton, Michigan	Marquette (NAHL)	—
14		Chad Pietila	Junior	F	5' 11" (1.8 m)	195 lb (88 kg)	1989-02-08	Milford, Michigan	Northern Michigan (CCHA)	—
15		David Johnstone	Freshman	F	5' 11" (1.8 m)	185 lb (84 kg)	1991-11-26	Grand Ledge, Michigan	Indiana (USHL)	—
16		Brett Olson (C)	Senior	F	6' 0" (1.83 m)	185 lb (84 kg)	1987-02-19	Superior, Wisconsin	Waterloo (USHL)	—
17		Mikael Lickteig	Junior (RS)	F	6' 0" (1.83 m)	185 lb (84 kg)	1987-05-04	Little Falls, Minnesota	Alexandria (NAHL)	—
18		Alex MacLeod	Senior	F	6' 0" (1.83 m)	215 lb (98 kg)	1987-12-16	Nelson, British Columbia	Camrose (AJHL)	—
19		Blake Pietila	Freshman	F	5' 11" (1.8 m)	195 lb (88 kg)	1993-02-20	Milford, Michigan	US NTDP (USHL)	NJD, 129th overall 2011
20		Blake Hietala	Freshman (RS)	F	5' 10" (1.78 m)	180 lb (82 kg)	1989-11-09	Houghton, Michigan	Melfort (SJHL)	—
21		Tommy Brown (injured)	Junior	D	5' 9" (1.75 m)	180 lb (82 kg)	1989-08-07	Prince Albert, Saskatchewan	Melfort (SJHL)	—
22		Jordan Baker (A)	Senior (RS)	F	5' 7" (1.7 m)	180 lb (82 kg)	1988-03-28	Chestermere, Alberta	Olds (AJHL)	—
24		Dan Sova	Sophomore	D	6' 4" (1.93 m)	225 lb (102 kg)	1990-02-24	Cottage Grove, Minnesota	Waterloo (USHL)	—
25		Carl Nielsen (A)	Junior	D	6' 4" (1.93 m)	225 lb (102 kg)	1988-07-03	Amherst, Ohio	Mahoning Valley (NAHL)	—
26		Jimmy Davis	Freshman	D	6' 0" (1.83 m)	185 lb (84 kg)	1993-04-22	Caledonia, Michigan	East Kentwood (USHS–MI)	—
27		Bryce Reddick	Senior	F	5' 10" (1.78 m)	185 lb (84 kg)	1989-08-05	Las Vegas, Nevada	Cowichan Valley (BCHL)	—
28		Milos Gordic	Sophomore (RS)	F	6' 5" (1.96 m)	210 lb (95 kg)	1989-04-12	Burnaby, British Columbia	Langley (BCHL)	—
30		Josh Robinson	Senior	G	6' 0" (1.83 m)	185 lb (84 kg)	1989-12-01	Frankenmuth, Michigan	Sioux City (USHL)	—
31		Corson Cramer	Senior	G	5' 11" (1.8 m)	190 lb (86 kg)	1988-10-15	Colorado Springs, Colorado	Ohio (USHL)	—
32		Tyler Gubb	Sophomore	F	6' 1" (1.85 m)	215 lb (98 kg)	1989-06-11	Markham, Ontario	Salmon Arm (BCHL)	—
34		Riley Sweeney	Freshman	D	6' 1" (1.85 m)	190 lb (86 kg)	1992-08-31	Delta, British Columbia	Surrey (BCHL)	—
35		Kevin Genoe	Junior	G	5' 11" (1.8 m)	165 lb (75 kg)	1990-05-16	Qualicum, British Columbia	Prince George (BCHL)	—

== Standings ==
2011–12 Western Collegiate Hockey Association standings
	Conference							Overall					
	GP	W	L	T	PTS	GF	GA	GP	W	L	T	GF	GA
#4 Minnesota†	28	20	8	0	40	88	57	43	28	14	1	155	99
#6 Minnesota–Duluth	28	16	7	5	37	103	73	41	25	10	6	147	106
#12 Denver	28	16	8	4	36	96	79	43	25	14	4	139	111
#5 North Dakota*	28	16	11	1	33	82	73	42	26	13	3	135	108
Colorado College	28	15	12	1	31	95	86	36	18	16	2	114	104
St. Cloud State	28	12	12	4	28	86	74	39	17	17	5	120	104
Omaha	28	11	12	5	27	83	85	38	14	18	6	106	112
Michigan Tech	28	11	13	4	26	85	87	39	16	19	4	111	116
Bemidji State	28	11	14	3	25	72	89	38	17	18	3	101	109
Wisconsin	28	11	15	2	24	76	83	37	17	18	2	105	102
Minnesota State	28	8	18	2	18	73	102	38	12	24	2	101	129
Alaska–Anchorage	28	5	22	1	11	60	111	36	9	25	2	85	134
Championship: North Dakota 4, Denver 0 † indicates conference regular season champion; * indicates conference tournament champion Rankings: USCHO.com Top 20 Poll

== Schedule and results ==
- Green background indicates win (2 points).
- Red background indicates loss (0 points).
- White background indicates tie (1 point).

2011–12 schedule and results

October: 5–2–1 (Home: 5–0–1; Road: 0–2–0)
#	Date	Visitor	Score	Home	OT	Decision	Attendance	WCHA	Overall	Box score
EX	October 1	Lakehead	3–5	Michigan Tech		Robinson	2,520
1†	October 7	American International	3–4	Michigan Tech		Genoe	2,440	0–0–0	1–0–0
2†	October 8	American International	1–3	Michigan Tech		Robinson	2,990	0–0–0	2–0–0
3	October 14	#18 Wisconsin	1–2	Michigan Tech	OT	Robinson	2,958	1–0–0	3–0–0
4	October 15	#18 Wisconsin	2–3	Michigan Tech	OT	Robinson	3,075	2–0–0	4–0–0
5	October 21	Michigan Tech	5–6	Bemidji State		Robinson	3,407	2–1–0	4–1–0
6	October 22	Michigan Tech	1–3	Bemidji State		Genoe	3,449	2–2–0	4–2–0
7	October 28	#2 Denver	2–7	Michigan Tech		Robinson	2,175	3–2–0	5–2–0
8	October 29	#2 Denver	2–2	Michigan Tech	OT	Robinson	2,183	3–2–1	5–2–1

November: 3–3–0 (Home: 1–1–0; Road: 2–2–0)
#	Date	Visitor	Score	Home	OT	Decision	Attendance	WCHA	Overall	Box score
9	November 4	Minnesota State	0–1	#16 Michigan Tech		Robinson	2,825	4–2–1	6–2–1
10	November 5	Minnesota State	6–3	#16 Michigan Tech		Robinson	3,618	4–3–1	6–3–1
11	November 18	#15 Michigan Tech	1–3	Alaska–Anchorage		Genoe	3,434	4–4–1	6–4–1
12	November 19	#15 Michigan Tech	5–0	Alaska–Anchorage		Robinson	2,843	5–4–1	7–4–1
13†	November 25	#18 Michigan Tech	2–3	St. Lawrence		Robinson	1,151	5–4–1	7–5–1
14†	November 26	#18 Michigan Tech	3–1	St. Lawrence		Robinson	1,126	5–4–1	8–5–1

December: 1–6–0 (Home: 0–2–0; Road: 1–2–0)
#	Date	Visitor	Score	Home	OT	Decision	Attendance	WCHA	Overall	Box score
15	December 2	#4 Minnesota–Duluth	3–3	#20 Michigan Tech		Robinson	2,589	5–5–1	8–6–1
16	December 3	#4 Minnesota–Duluth	4–2	#20 Michigan Tech		Robinson	2,657	5–6–1	8–7–1
17	December 9	Michigan Tech	3–2	#2 Minnesota	OT	Robinson	9,451	6–6–1	9–7–1
18	December 10	Michigan Tech	2–6	#2 Minnesota		Robinson	9,771	6–7–1	9–8–1
19†	December 16	Michigan Tech	1–4	Northern Michigan		Robinson	3,880	6–7–1	9–9–1
20‡	December 29	#14 Michigan State	3–1	Michigan Tech		Robinson	15,091	6–7–1	9–10–1
21‡	December 30	#3 Boston College	2–1	Michigan Tech		Robinson	17,242	6–7–1	9–11–1

January: 3–1–1 (Home: 2–1–0; Road: 1–0–1)
#	Date	Visitor	Score	Home	OT	Decision	Attendance	WCHA	Overall	Box score
22	January 13	Alaska–Anchorage	2–6	Michigan Tech		Robinson	2,229	7–7–1	10–11–1
23	January 14	Alaska–Anchorage	4–6	Michigan Tech		Robinson	2,672	8–7–1	11–11–1
24†	January 21	Northern Michigan	5–2	Michigan Tech		Genoe	3,708	8–7–1	11–12–1
25	January 27	Michigan Tech	4–4	Minnesota–Duluth	OT	Robinson	6,670	8–7–2	11–12–2
26	January 28	Michigan Tech	5–0	Minnesota–Duluth		Robinson	6,776	9–7–2	12–12–2

February: 1–3–2 (Home: 0–1–1; Road: 1–2–1)
#	Date	Visitor	Score	Home	OT	Decision	Attendance	WCHA	Overall	Box score
27	February 3	Michigan Tech	3–5	Minnesota State		Robinson	2,923	9–8–2	12–13–2
28	February 4	Michigan Tech	7–3	Minnesota State		Robinson	3,348	10–8–2	13–13–2
29	February 10	Nebraska–Omaha	3–3	Michigan Tech	OT	Robinson	3,454	10–8–3	13–13–3
30	February 11	Nebraska–Omaha	4–0	Michigan Tech		Robinson	3,488	10–9–3	13–14–3
31	February 17	Michigan Tech	2–4	#14 North Dakota		Robinson	11,694	10–10–3	13–15–3
32	February 18	Michigan Tech	1–1	#14 North Dakota	OT	Robinson	12,065	10–10–4	13–15–4
33	February 24	St. Cloud State		Michigan Tech
34	February 25	St. Cloud State		Michigan Tech

March: 0–0–0 (Home: 0–0–0; Road: 0–0–0)
#	Date	Visitor	Score	Home	OT	Decision	Attendance	WCHA	Overall	Box score
35	March 2	Michigan Tech		Colorado College
36	March 3	Michigan Tech		Colorado College

† Non-conference game EX Exhibition game ‡ Great Lakes Invitational

== Awards and honors ==
WCHA Offensive Player of the Week

- Milos Gordic, F – November 1
- Jordan Baker, F – January 17

WCHA Defensive Player of the Week

- Josh Robinson, G – October 18, November 1 (shared with Kent Patterson, G, Minnesota), January 31

WCHA Rookie of the Week

- Blake Pietila, F – October 11, January 31
