= Eddie Dempsey (disambiguation) =

Eddie Dempsey (born c. 1982) is an English trade unionist.

Eddie or Ed Dempsey may also refer to:

- Eddie Dempsey (jockey) (1911–1989), Irish jockey
- Ed Dempsey, Canadian ice hockey coach
