= 2011–12 Wisconsin Badgers men's ice hockey season =

American college ice hockey season

- Conference: 9th WCHA
- Home ice: Kohl Center

Rankings
- USA Today/USA Hockey Magazine: —
- USCHO.com/CBS College Sports: —

Record
- Overall: 15–15–2
- Home: 12–7–1
- Road: 3–8–1

Coaches and captains
- Head coach: Mike Eaves
- Assistant coaches: Bill Butters; Gary Shuchuk
- Captain: John Ramage
- Alternate captain(s): Justin Schultz, Ryan Little

The 2012–12 Wisconsin Badgers men's ice hockey season is the team's 59th season and their 53rd season as a member of the Western Collegiate Hockey Association. They represent the University of Wisconsin–Madison in the 2011–12 NCAA Division I men's ice hockey season. The team is coached by Mike Eaves, and they play their home games at Kohl Center.

== Regular season ==
- On October 21 and 22 the Badgers swept North Dakota for the first time since 2006, the first time at the Kohl Center since 2004.
- On November 11 the Badgers beat #1 ranked Minnesota 3–1.

=== Standings ===
2011–12 Western Collegiate Hockey Association standings
	Conference							Overall					
	GP	W	L	T	PTS	GF	GA	GP	W	L	T	GF	GA
#4 Minnesota†	28	20	8	0	40	88	57	43	28	14	1	155	99
#6 Minnesota–Duluth	28	16	7	5	37	103	73	41	25	10	6	147	106
#12 Denver	28	16	8	4	36	96	79	43	25	14	4	139	111
#5 North Dakota*	28	16	11	1	33	82	73	42	26	13	3	135	108
Colorado College	28	15	12	1	31	95	86	36	18	16	2	114	104
St. Cloud State	28	12	12	4	28	86	74	39	17	17	5	120	104
Omaha	28	11	12	5	27	83	85	38	14	18	6	106	112
Michigan Tech	28	11	13	4	26	85	87	39	16	19	4	111	116
Bemidji State	28	11	14	3	25	72	89	38	17	18	3	101	109
Wisconsin	28	11	15	2	24	76	83	37	17	18	2	105	102
Minnesota State	28	8	18	2	18	73	102	38	12	24	2	101	129
Alaska–Anchorage	28	5	22	1	11	60	111	36	9	25	2	85	134
Championship: North Dakota 4, Denver 0 † indicates conference regular season champion; * indicates conference tournament champion Rankings: USCHO.com Top 20 Poll

=== Schedule and results ===
- Green background indicates win (2 points).
- Red background indicates loss (0 points).
- White background indicates tie (1 point).

2011–12 Schedule and Results

October: 4–4–0 (Home: 4–2–0; Road: 0–2–0)
#	Date	Visitor	Score	Home	OT	Decision	Attendance	WCHA	Overall	Box score
1†	October 7	Northern Michigan	3–2	Wisconsin	OT	Peterson	9,444	0–0–0	0–1–0
2†	October 8	Northern Michigan	2–3	Wisconsin		Rumpel	11,158	0–0–0	1–1–0
3	October 14	Wisconsin	1–2	Michigan Tech	OT	Peterson	2,958	0–1–0	1–2–0
4	October 15	Wisconsin	2–3	Michigan Tech	OT	Rumpel	3,075	0–2–0	1–3–0
5	October 21	North Dakota	3–5	Wisconsin		Peterson	10,594	1–2–0	2–3–0
6	October 22	North Dakota	3–5	Wisconsin		Rumpel	12,077	2–2–0	3–3–0
7	October 28	Nebraska-Omaha	5–4	Wisconsin		Peterson	9,713	2–3–0	3–4–0
8	October 29	Nebraska Omaha	3–6	Wisconsin		Rumpel	11,207	3–3–0	4–4–0

November: 3–4–1 (Home: 3–1–0; Road: 0–3–1)
#	Date	Visitor	Score	Home	OT	Decision	Attendance	WCHA	Overall	Box score
9	November 4	Wisconsin	2–7	St. Cloud State		Peterson	5,891	3–4–0	4–5–0
10	November 5	Wisconsin	3–3	St. Cloud State	OT	Rumpel	5,942	3–4–1	4–5–1
11	November 11	Minnesota	1–3	Wisconsin		Rumpel	11,445	4–4–1	5–5–1
12	November 12	Minnesota	4–1	Wisconsin		Rumpel	13,149	4–5–1	5–6–1
13	November 18	Wisconsin	2–4	Colorado College		Rumpel	7,007	4–6–1	5–7–1
14	November 19	Wisconsin	1–4	Colorado College		Peterson	7,472	4–7–1	5–8–1
15†	November 25	Mercyhurst	2–7	Wisconsin		Rumpel	10,374	4–7–1	6–8–1
16†	November 26	Mercyhurst	2–5	Wisconsin		Peterson	11,394	4–7–1	7–8–1

December: 0–1–1 (Home: 0–1–1; Road: 0–0–0)
#	Date	Visitor	Score	Home	OT	Decision	Attendance	WCHA	Overall	Box score
17	December 9	Minnesota Duluth	3–3	Wisconsin	OT	Rumpel	10,925	4–7–2	7–8–2
18	December 10	Minnesota Duluth	4–2	Wisconsin		Rumpel	12,620	4–8–2	7–9–2
19*	December 31	US Under-18 Team	3–4	Wisconsin		Rumpel	11,121	4–8–2	7–9–2

January: 5–3–0 (Home: 4–0–0; Road: 1–3–0)
#	Date	Visitor	Score	Home	OT	Decision	Attendance	WCHA	Overall	Box score
20†	January 6	RIT	3–6	Wisconsin		Peterson	11,741	4–8–2	8–9–2
21†	January 7	RIT	1–2	Wisconsin		Rumpel	12,453	4–8–2	9–9–2
22	January 13	Wisconsin	4–0	Minnesota State		Rumpel	3,656	5–8–2	10–9–2
23	January 14	Wisconsin	0–3	Minnesota State		Rumpel	4,051	5–9–2	10–10–2
24	January 20	Alaska Anchorage	0–4	Wisconsin		Rumpel	10,532	6–9–2	11–10–2
25	January 21	Alaska Anchorage	2–3	Wisconsin		Rumpel	13,713	7–9–2	12–10–2
26	January 27	Wisconsin	3–5	North Dakota		Rumpel	11,769	7–10–2	12–11–2
27	January 28	Wisconsin	2–4	North Dakota		Rumpel	11,898	7–11–2	12–12–2

February: 3–3–0 (Home: 1–2–0; Road: 2–0–0)
#	Date	Visitor	Score	Home	OT	Decision	Attendance	WCHA	Overall	Box score
28	February 3	St. Cloud State	5–1	Wisconsin		Rumpel	11,213	7–12–2	12–13–2
29	February 4	St. Cloud State	2–1	Wisconsin		Peterson	13,815	7–13–2	12–14–2
30	February 17	Denver	3–0	Wisconsin		Rumpel	12,566	7–14–2	12–15–2
31	February 18	Denver	2–5	Wisconsin		Peterson	15,325	8–14–2	13–15–2
32	February 24	Wisconsin	4–2	Bemidji State		Peterson	3,532	9–14–2	14–15–2
33	February 25	Wisconsin	4–2	Bemidji State		Rumpel	3,891	10–14–2	15–15–2

March: 0–0–0 (Home: 0–0–0; Road: 0–0–0)
#	Date	Visitor	Score	Home	OT	Decision	Attendance	WCHA	Overall	Box score
34	March 2	Wisconsin		Minnesota
35	March 3	Wisconsin		Minnesota

† Non-conference game * Exhibition game

== Awards and honors ==
- Joel Rumpel, WCHA Rookie of the Week (Week of October 25)

== See also ==
- 2011–12 Wisconsin Badgers women's ice hockey season
