= 2012 WCHA men's ice hockey tournament =

2012 WCHA Men's ice hockey tournament
- Dates: March 9–17, 2012
- Teams: 12
- Finals site: Xcel Energy Center; St. Paul, Minnesota
- Champions: North Dakota (17th title)
- Winning coach: Dave Hakstol (5th title)
- MVP: Aaron Dell (North Dakota)
- WCHA Men's Ice Hockey Tournaments

The 2012 WCHA Men's Ice Hockey Tournament was the 53rd conference playoff in league history and 58th season where a WCHA champion was crowned. The 2012 tournament was played between March 9 and March 17, 2012, at five conference arenas and the Xcel Energy Center in St. Paul, Minnesota. By winning the tournament, North Dakota received the Broadmoor Trophy and was awarded the Western Collegiate Hockey Association's automatic bid to the 2012 NCAA Division I Men's Ice Hockey Tournament.

== Format ==
The first round of the postseason tournament features a best-of-three games format. All twelve conference teams participate in the tournament. Teams are seeded No. 1 through No. 12 according to their final conference standing, with a tiebreaker system used to seed teams with an identical number of points accumulated. The top six seeded teams each earn home ice and host one of the lower seeded teams.

The winners of the first round series advance to the Xcel Energy Center for the WCHA Final Five, the collective name for the quarterfinal, semifinal, and championship rounds. The Final Five uses a single-elimination format. Teams are re-seeded No. 1 through No. 6 according to the final regular season conference standings, with the top two teams automatically advancing to the semifinals. All Final Five games will be broadcast by Fox Sports North and carried by Root Sports Rocky Mountain and Fox College Sports Central.

=== Conference standings ===
Note: GP = Games played; W = Wins; L = Losses; T = Ties; PTS = Points; GF = Goals For; GA = Goals Against

2011–12 Western Collegiate Hockey Association standings
	Conference							Overall					
	GP	W	L	T	PTS	GF	GA	GP	W	L	T	GF	GA
#4 Minnesota†	28	20	8	0	40	88	57	43	28	14	1	155	99
#6 Minnesota–Duluth	28	16	7	5	37	103	73	41	25	10	6	147	106
#12 Denver	28	16	8	4	36	96	79	43	25	14	4	139	111
#5 North Dakota*	28	16	11	1	33	82	73	42	26	13	3	135	108
Colorado College	28	15	12	1	31	95	86	36	18	16	2	114	104
St. Cloud State	28	12	12	4	28	86	74	39	17	17	5	120	104
Omaha	28	11	12	5	27	83	85	38	14	18	6	106	112
Michigan Tech	28	11	13	4	26	85	87	39	16	19	4	111	116
Bemidji State	28	11	14	3	25	72	89	38	17	18	3	101	109
Wisconsin	28	11	15	2	24	76	83	37	17	18	2	105	102
Minnesota State	28	8	18	2	18	73	102	38	12	24	2	101	129
Alaska–Anchorage	28	5	22	1	11	60	111	36	9	25	2	85	134
Championship: North Dakota 4, Denver 0 † indicates conference regular season champion; * indicates conference tournament champion Rankings: USCHO.com Top 20 Poll

== Bracket ==
Teams are reseeded after the first round

First round March 9–11
1	Minnesota	2	7	—
12	Alaska-Anchorage	1	3	—
2	Minnesota-Duluth	4	3**	—
11	Minnesota State	2	2	—
3	Denver	0	3	3*
10	Wisconsin	1	1	2
4	North Dakota	4	4	—
9	Bemidji State	1	3	—
5	Colorado College	1	3	—
8	Michigan Tech	3	4*	—
6	St. Cloud State	4	3	—
7	Nebraska-Omaha	0	1	—

Quarterfinals; March 15
4	North Dakota	4
6	St. Cloud State	1
3	Denver	3*
8	Michigan Tech	2

Semifinals; March 16
1	Minnesota	3
4	North Dakota	6
2	Minnesota-Duluth	3
3	Denver	4**

Championship; March 17
4	North Dakota	4
3	Denver	0

Note: * denotes overtime periods

== Results ==
=== First round ===
==== (1) Minnesota vs. (12) Alaska-Anchorage ====
March 9	Minnesota	2 - 1	Alaska-Anchorage	Mariucci Arena	Recap
No scoring		First period	No scoring
Erik Haula (16) (Schmidt, Parenteau) - 01:42; Erik Haula (17) (Schmidt, Hansen) - 09:52		Second period	19:58 - PP - Brad Gorham (2) (Scheid, Leinweber)
No scoring		Third period	No scoring
Kent Patterson ( 16 saves / 17 shots )		Goalie stats	Chris Kamal ( 32 saves / 34 shots )

March 10	Minnesota	7 - 3	Alaska-Anchorage	Mariucci Arena	Recap
Jake Hansen (12) (Marshall, Alt) - 04:03		First period	No scoring
Zach Budish (11) (Rau, Bjugstad) - 11:16; Nick Bjugstad (16) (Haula, Schmidt) - PP - 19:14		Second period	00:35 - PP - Matt Bailey (9) (Allen, Docken); 07:57 - PP2 - Matt Bailey (10) (Kwas, Coldwell); 08:20 - PP - Scott Allen (3) (Coldwell, Docken)
Erik Haula (18) (Rau, Budish) - 05:05; Erik Haula (19) (Warning, Alt) - 05:23; Seth Helgeson (4) (Condon, Matson) - 06:36; Sam Warning (6) (Haula, Marshall) - 09:39		Third period	No scoring
Kent Patterson ( 16 saves / 19 shots ) Jake Kremer ( 0 saves / 0 shots )		Goalie stats	Chris Kamal ( 31 saves / 38 shots )

Minnesota Wins Series 2 - 0

==== (2) Minnesota-Duluth vs. (11) Minnesota State ====
March 9	Minnesota-Duluth	4 - 2	Minnesota State	AMSOIL Arena	Recap
J.T. Brown (22) (Herbert, Oleksuk) - 11:31		First period	No scoring
Brady Lamb (8) (Grun, Hendrickson) - 01:06		Second period	05:29 - Max Gaede (3) (Dorr, Louwerse); 19:15 - Joe Schiller (3) (Elbrecht)
Brady Lamb (9) (Basaraba) - 11:58; Wade Bergman (8) - EN - 19:54		Third period	No scoring
Kenny Reiter ( 26 saves / 28 shots )		Goalie stats	Austin Lee ( 34 saves / 37 shots )

March 10	Minnesota-Duluth	3 - 2	2OT	Minnesota State	AMSOIL Arena	Recap
No scoring		First period		19:05 - PP - Matt Leitner (11) (Palmquist)
David Grun (3) (Basaraba, Hendrickson) - 13:46		Second period		No scoring
J.T. Brown (23) (Lamb, Oleksuk) - PP - 06:59		Third period		03:54 - Tyler Elbrecht (1) (McInnis)
Mike Seidel (15) (Flaherty, Connolly) - 04:07		Second overtime period		No scoring
Kenny Reiter ( 47 saves / 49 shots )		Goalie stats		Austin Lee ( 56 saves / 59 shots )

Minnesota-Duluth Wins Series 2 - 0

==== (3) Denver vs. (10) Wisconsin ====
March 9	Denver	0 - 1	Wisconsin	Magness Arena	Recap
No scoring		First period	No scoring
No scoring		Second period	No scoring
No scoring		Third period	14:10 - Sean Little (2) (McCabe, Ramage)
Juho Olkinuora ( 29 saves / 30 shots )		Goalie stats	Joel Rumpel ( 28 saves / 28 shots )

March 10	Denver	3 - 1	Wisconsin	Magness Arena	Recap
No scoring		First period	No scoring
No scoring		Second period	No scoring
Nate Dewhurst (3) (Jackson, Lee) - 04:04; Luke Salazar (10) (Zucker, N. Shore) - 12:53; Nick Shore (12) - EN - 19:04		Third period	06:54 - Justin Schultz (16) (McCabe)
Sam Brittain ( 27 saves / 28 shots )		Goalie stats	Joel Rumpel ( 39 saves / 41 shots )

March 11	Denver	3 - 2	OT	Wisconsin	Magness Arena	Recap
No scoring		First period		No scoring
Ty Loney (9) (Salazar, D. Shore) - 11:17		Second period		06:40 - SH - Mark Zengerle (13); 12:32 - Tyler Barnes (11) (Simonelli, Schultz)
Nick Shore (13) (Zucker, D. Shore) - PP - 11:17		Third period		No scoring
Luke Salazar (11) (D. Shore, Mayfield) - 01:40		First overtime period		No scoring
Sam Brittain ( 24 saves / 26 shots )		Goalie stats		Joel Rumpel ( 30 saves / 33 shots )

Denver Wins Series 2 - 1

==== (4) North Dakota vs. (9) Bemidji State ====
March 9	North Dakota	4 - 1	Bemidji State	Ralph Engelstad Arena	Recap
Connor Gaarder (3) (Parks, Rowney) - PP - 17:10		First period	No scoring
Corban Knight (13) (Nelson) - 07:15		Second period	No scoring
Mark MacMillan (6) (Rowney, Parks) - 14:08; Ben Blood (3) (Rowney) - PP - EN - 19:05		Third period	13:05 - Aaron McLeod (9) (Mattson, Wacker)
Aaron Dell ( 28 saves / 29 shots )		Goalie stats	Dan Bakala ( 19 saves / 22 shots )

March 10	North Dakota	4 - 3	Bemidji State	Ralph Engelstad Arena	Recap
Connor Gaarder (4) (Sinkbeil, MacMillan) - 13:48		First period	No scoring
Carter Rowney (17) (MacMillan, Parks) - 07:30; Michael Parks (17) (MacMillan, Rowney) - 18:17		Second period	06:25 - Jordan George (4) (Hunt, Kinne)
Dillon Simpson (17) (Lamoureux) - 05:06		Third period	16:04 - Jamie MacQueen (4) (Boehm, Hunt); 16:23 - Jamie MacQueen (5) (Walters)
Brad Eidsness ( 26 saves / 29 shots )		Goalie stats	Dan Bakala ( 28 saves / 32 shots )

North Dakota Wins Series 2 - 0

==== (5) Colorado College vs. (8) Michigan Tech ====
March 9	Colorado College	1 - 3	Michigan Tech	World Arena	Recap
No scoring		First period	No scoring
No scoring		Second period	17:12 - David Johnstone (10)
Rylan Schwartz (23) (Guentzel, J. Schwartz) - PP2 - 00:39		Third period	03:41 - Dennis Rix (4) (Reddick, Pietila); 10:21 - Alex MacLeod (7) (D. Johnstone, J. Johnstone)
Josh Thorimbert ( 26 saves / 29 shots )		Goalie stats	Josh Robinson ( 16 saves / 17 shots )

March 10	Colorado College	3 - 4	OT	Michigan Tech	World Arena	Recap
Andrew Hamburg (3) (Skalbeck, Thorimbert) - 08:23		First period		01:08 - David Johnstone (11); 06:46 - Brett Olson (10) (Baker, Stebner)
Andrew Hamburg (4) (McDermott) - 03:50		Second period		No scoring
Scott Winkler (7) (Krushelnyski, Dineen) - 08:52		Third period		18:55 - EA - Steven Seigo (5) (Pietila, Gordic)
No scoring		First overtime period		03:30 - David Johnstone (12) (Sova, Fillion)
Josh Thorimbert ( 37 saves / 41 shots )		Goalie stats		Josh Robinson ( 29 saves / 32 shots )

Michigan Tech Wins Series 2 - 0

==== (6) St. Cloud State vs. (7) Nebraska-Omaha ====
March 9	St. Cloud State	4 - 0	Nebraska-Omaha	National Hockey Center	Recap
Joe Rehkamp (2) (Milan, Bertsch) - 02:30; Ben Hanowski (21) (Festler, Prochno) - PP - 16:50		First period	No scoring
Andrew Prochno (5) (Festler, Novak) - 11:32		Second period	No scoring
Taylor Johnson (2) (Zabkowicz, Olover) - PP - 19:36		Third period	No scoring
Mike Lee ( 27 saves / 27 shots )		Goalie stats	Ryan Massa ( 24 saves / 28 shots )

March 10	St. Cloud State	3 - 1	Nebraska-Omaha	National Hockey Center	Recap
No scoring		First period	No scoring
Jared Festler (15) (Hanowski, Dowd) - PP - 00:22		Second period	07:16 - Dominic Zombo (2) (Gwidt, Jaycob Megna)
Ben Hanowski (22) (Bertsch, Jensen) - 19:17; Travis Novak (12) - EN - 19:59		Third period	No scoring
Mike Lee ( 32 saves / 33 shots )		Goalie stats	John Faulkner ( 35 saves / 37 shots )

St. Cloud State Wins Series 2 - 0

=== Quarterfinals ===
==== (3) Denver vs. (8) Michigan Tech ====
March 15	Denver	3 - 2	OT	Michigan Tech	Xcel Energy Center	Recap
Ty Loney (10) (D. Shore) - 03:50		First period		10:45 - Blake Pietila (10) (Fillion)
No scoring		Second period		No scoring
Luke Salazar (12) (Loney, D. Shore) - 15:28		Third period		00:18 - Ryan Furne (12) (Baker)
Jason Zucker (21) (LaLeggia, N. Shore) - 02:18		First overtime period		No scoring
Juho Olkinuora ( 27 saves / 29 shots )		Goalie stats		Josh Robinson ( 41 saves / 44 shots )

==== (4) North Dakota vs. (6) St. Cloud State ====
March 15	North Dakota	4 - 1	St. Cloud State	Xcel Energy Center	Recap
Corban Knight (14) (MacMillan, MacWilliam) - 07:40		First period	16:14 - PP - Ben Hanowski (23) (Dowd, Prochno)
Brock Nelson (24) (Blood, Forbort) - 15:51		Second period	No scoring
Brock Nelson (25) (Kristo) - EN - 19:00; Danny Kristo (18) - EN,PP - 19:33		Third period	No scoring
Aaron Dell ( 29 saves / 30 shots )		Goalie stats	Mike Lee ( 24 saves / 26 shots )

=== Semifinals ===
==== (1) Minnesota vs. (4) North Dakota ====
March 16	Minnesota	3 - 6	North Dakota	Xcel Energy Center	Recap
Kyle Rau (17) (Haula, Schmidt) - PP - 12:37		First period	No scoring
Jake Hansen (13) (Haula, Schmidt) - PP - 05:55; Zach Budish (12) (Holl, Rau) - 10:01		Second period	14:51 - Derek Forbort (2) (Lamoureux)
No scoring		Third period	05:31 - Michael Parks (10) (Rowney, Forbort); 06:01 - Brock Nelson (26) (Senkbeil); 09:42 - Mario Lamoureux (2) (Pattyn, Parks); 10:19 - PP - Corban Knight (15) (Mattson, Kristo); 16:10 - Mario Lamoureux (3) (MacMillan, Blood)
Kent Patterson ( 22 saves / 28 shots )		Goalie stats	Aaron Dell ( 22 saves / 25 shots )

==== (2) Minnesota-Duluth vs. (3) Denver ====
March 16	Minnesota-Duluth	3 - 4	2OT	Denver	Xcel Energy Center	Recap
No scoring		First period		08:01 - Shawn Ostrow (11) (Dewhurst)
Mike Seidel (16) (Lamb, Oleksuk) - PP - 10:57; Mike Seidel (17) (Connolly, Kishel) - 13:45		Second period		03:26 - Jason Zucker (22) (N. Shore); 06:02 - Dustin Jackson (2) (Ostrow, Mermis)
Jack Connolly (19) (Olsen, Seidel) - 12:38		Third period		No scoring
No scoring		Second overtime period		08:14 - Zac Larraza (1) (Didier)
Kenny Reiter ( 45 saves / 49 shots )		Goalie stats		Sam Brittain ( 67 saves / 70 shots )

=== Championship ===
==== (3) Denver vs. (4) North Dakota ====
March 17	Denver	0 - 4	North Dakota	Xcel Energy Center	Recap
No scoring		First period	17:43 - PP - Brock Nelson (27) (Simpson, Knight); 18:29 - Carter Rowney (18) (MacMillan, Forbort)
No scoring		Second period	09:58 - PP - Michael Parks (11) (Rowney, Forbort)
No scoring		Third period	07:11 - SH - Mark MacMillan (7)
Juho Olkinuora ( 18 saves / 22 shots ) Adam Murray ( 7 saves / 7 shots )		Goalie stats	Aaron Dell ( 22 saves / 22 shots )

== Tournament awards ==
=== All-Tournament Team ===
- F Mario Lamoureux (North Dakota)
- F Brock Nelson (North Dakota)
- F Jason Zucker (Denver)
- D Derek Forbort (North Dakota)
- D Andrew MacWilliams (North Dakota)
- G Aaron Dell* (North Dakota)

* Most Valuable Player(s)
