= Aaron Dell =

Canadian ice hockey player (born 1989)

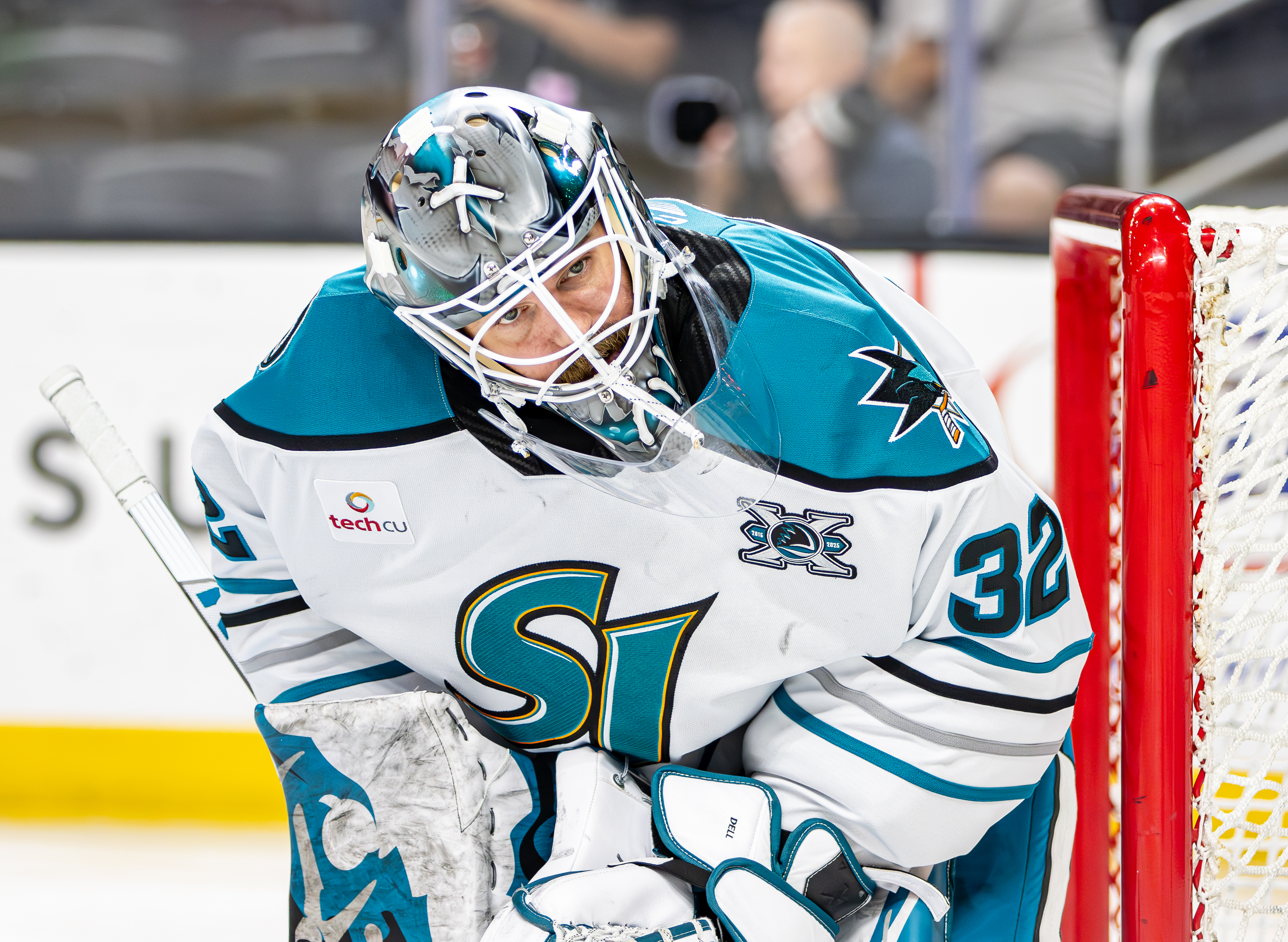
- Dell with the San Jose Barracuda in 2025
- Born: May 4, 1989 (age 37) Airdrie, Alberta, Canada
- Height: 6 ft 0 in (183 cm)
- Weight: 213 lb (97 kg; 15 st 3 lb)
- Position: Goaltender
- Caught: Left
- Played for: San Jose Sharks; New Jersey Devils; Buffalo Sabres
- NHL draft: Undrafted
- Playing career: 2012–2025

Aaron Dell (born May 4, 1989) is a Canadian former professional ice hockey goaltender. Originally undrafted, Dell has played seven seasons in the National Hockey League (NHL), mainly for the San Jose Sharks, and shorter stints for the New Jersey Devils and the Buffalo Sabres before retiring in 2025.

== Playing career ==
Dell played collegiate hockey at the University of North Dakota. Dell returned to the Allen Americans in trade from the Utah Grizzlies on October 11, 2014. While with the Worcester Sharks, on March 1, 2015, Dell was signed to a one-year entry-level contract with the team's NHL affiliate, the San Jose Sharks, for the remainder of the season.

In the 2016–17 season, Dell made the Sharks' opening night roster as the team's backup goaltender to Martin Jones. On October 18, 2016, Dell made his NHL debut and won against the New York Islanders. On February 28, 2018, Dell signed a two-year contract extension with the Sharks.

On October 13, 2020, Dell signed a one-year $800,000 contract with the Toronto Maple Leafs as a free agent. After attending the Maple Leafs training camp for the pandemic delayed 2020–21 season, Dell was included in the team's taxi squad. On January 18, 2021, Dell's brief tenure with the Maple Leafs ended as he was claimed off waivers by the New Jersey Devils.

On July 28, 2021, Dell signed as a free agent to a one-year, $750,000 contract with the Buffalo Sabres. On September 13, Buffalo announced that Dell will wear jersey no. 30, a move that upset many fans as the number had not been issued since Ryan Miller's departure from the team in 2014.

On January 25, 2022, during a game against the Ottawa Senators, Dell delivered an unprovoked hit to forward Drake Batherson, causing an ankle injury; as a result, Batherson was ruled out for the 2022 NHL All-Star Game which he was supposed to attend. The following day, Dell was suspended three games for the hit, officially ruled as interference.

As a free agent from the Sabres, Dell returned to his original club, the San Jose Sharks, after agreeing to a one-year, two-way contract on July 13, 2022.

Dell signed a professional tryout deal with the Columbus Blue Jackets in August 2023. He was released from his PTO on October 5. In December, Dell signed a professional tryout deal with the Carolina Hurricanes. He was later released by the Hurricanes without a contract and later signed an AHL contract for the remainder of the season with the Ontario Reign, primary affiliate to the Los Angeles Kings, on January 6, 2024. Dell made 5 appearances with the Reign before securing a one-year, two-way contract for the remainder of the season with the Kings on March 5, 2024.

On September 4, 2025, Dell announced his retirement from professional hockey.

== Records ==
- 2010–11: Holds UND school record for most wins in a season (30), surpassing previous record holder Ed Belfour (29)
- 2014–15: Holds Worcester Sharks record for GAA at 2.06 and SAV%.927 and tied with Alex Stalock with four shutouts.

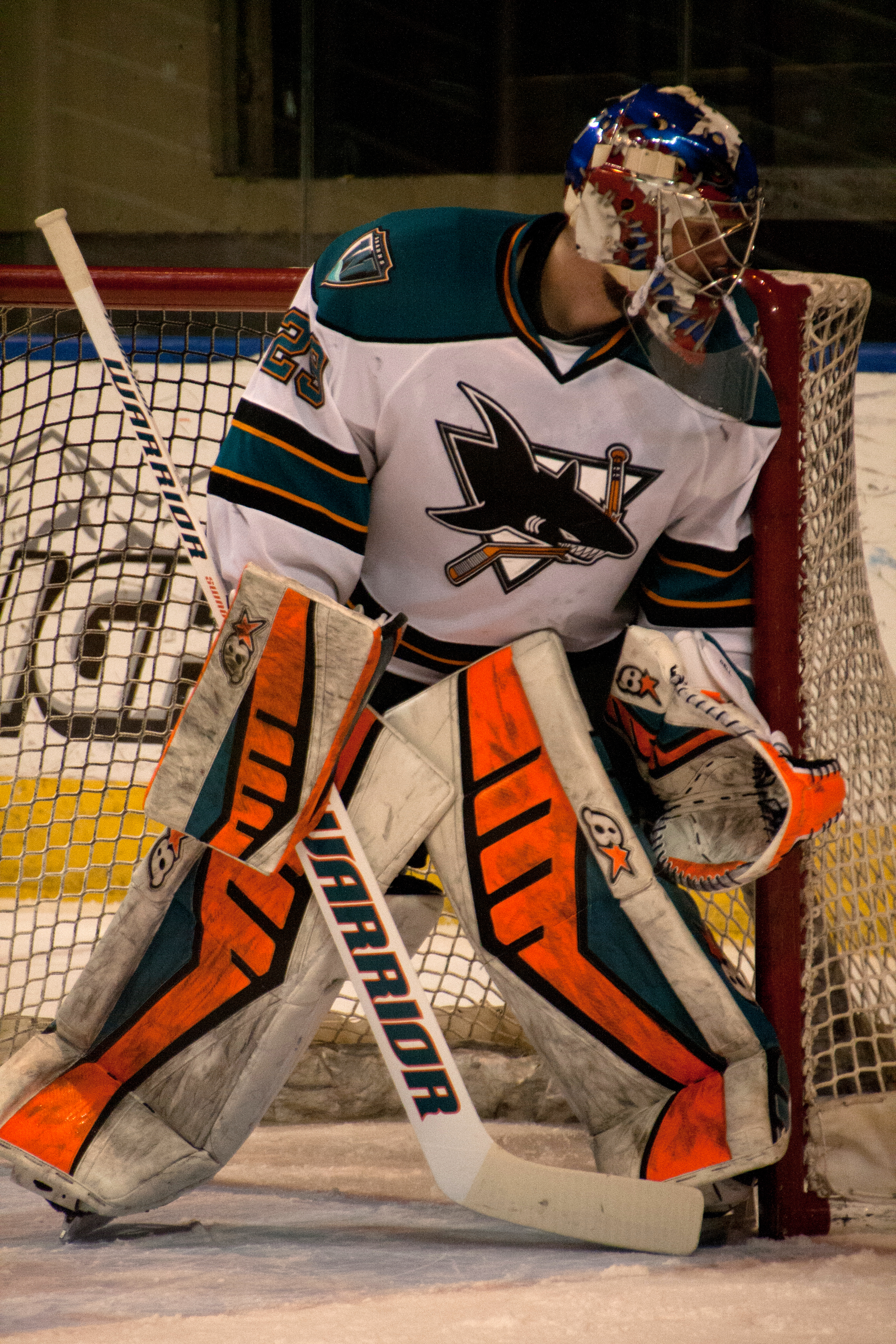
Dell with the Worcester Sharks in 2015

== Career statistics ==
			Regular season									Playoffs
Season	Team	League	GP	W	L	T/OT	MIN	GA	SO	GAA	SV%	GP	W	L	MIN	GA	SO	GAA	SV%
2006–07	Airdrie Thunder	HJHL	36	31	2	3	—	—	—	—	—	—	—	—	—	—	—	—	—
2007–08	Calgary Canucks	AJHL	23	5	11	2	1245	65	0	3.13	.891	—	—	—	—	—	—	—	—
2008–09	Calgary Canucks	AJHL	51	25	17	8	2986	126	3	2.53	.923	4	1	3	253	13	0	3.08	.913
2009–10	U. of North Dakota	WCHA	5	1	3	1	199	6	1	1.81	.897	—	—	—	—	—	—	—	—
2010–11	U. of North Dakota	WCHA	40	30	7	2	2349	70	6	1.79	.924	—	—	—	—	—	—	—	—
2011–12	U. of North Dakota	WCHA	33	18	10	2	1799	80	2	2.67	.900	—	—	—	—	—	—	—	—
2012–13	Allen Americans	CHL	44	22	11	6	2344	90	3	2.30	.916	19	12	7	1097	45	1	2.46	.915
2013–14	Utah Grizzlies	ECHL	29	19	7	3	1735	62	2	2.14	.920	3	1	1	188	6	0	1.92	.932
2013–14	Abbotsford Heat	AHL	6	1	2	0	262	10	0	2.29	.922	—	—	—	—	—	—	—	—
2014–15	Allen Americans	ECHL	12	8	1	2	676	32	1	2.84	.902	—	—	—	—	—	—	—	—
2014–15	Worcester Sharks	AHL	26	15	8	2	1544	53	4	2.06	.927	3	0	3	149	12	0	4.83	.857
2015–16	San Jose Barracuda	AHL	40	17	16	6	2281	92	4	2.42	.922	4	1	3	231	10	0	2.59	.932
2016–17	San Jose Sharks	NHL	20	11	6	1	1115	37	1	2.00	.931	—	—	—	—	—	—	—	—
2017–18	San Jose Sharks	NHL	29	15	5	4	1523	67	2	2.64	.914	2	0	0	47	2	0	2.55	.929
2018–19	San Jose Sharks	NHL	25	10	8	4	1324	70	2	3.17	.886	2	0	1	90	5	0	3.33	.861
2019–20	San Jose Sharks	NHL	33	12	15	3	1835	92	0	3.01	.907	—	—	—	—	—	—	—	—
2020–21	Binghamton Devils	AHL	1	0	0	1	65	5	0	4.62	.839	—	—	—	—	—	—	—	—
2020–21	New Jersey Devils	NHL	7	1	5	0	320	22	0	4.14	.857	—	—	—	—	—	—	—	—
2021–22	Rochester Americans	AHL	22	12	7	1	1259	61	0	2.91	.909	10	5	5	627	37	0	3.54	.883
2021–22	Buffalo Sabres	NHL	12	1	8	1	566	38	0	4.03	.893	—	—	—	—	—	—	—	—
2022–23	San Jose Barracuda	AHL	38	15	17	4	2067	108	2	3.14	.898	—	—	—	—	—	—	—	—
2022–23	San Jose Sharks	NHL	4	0	3	0	200	9	0	2.71	.913	—	—	—	—	—	—	—	—
2023–24	Ontario Reign	AHL	12	7	4	1	723	31	1	2.57	.914	—	—	—	—	—	—	—	—
2024–25	Wichita Thunder	ECHL	13	6	6	1	783	38	0	2.91	.914	—	—	—	—	—	—	—	—
2024–25	San Jose Barracuda	AHL	10	3	3	2	579	36	0	3.73	.890	—	—	—	—	—	—	—	—
NHL totals			130	50	50	13	6,874	335	5	2.92	.905	4	0	1	137	7	0	3.08	.891

== Awards and honours ==
Award	Year
College
All-WCHA First Team	2010–11
NCAA goaltending title	2010–11
AHCA West Second-Team All-American	2010–11
WCHA All-Tournament Team	2012
WCHA Final Five tournament MVP	2011–12
CHL
All-CHL Team (First Team All-Star)	2012–13
All-Rookie team	2012–13
Most Outstanding Goaltender	2012–13
Ray Miron President's Cup champion	2012–13

Awards and achievements
Preceded by Matt Frattin	WCHA Most Valuable Player in Tournament; 2012	Succeeded by Nic Kerdiles
