= Blake Pietila =

American ice hockey player (born 1993)

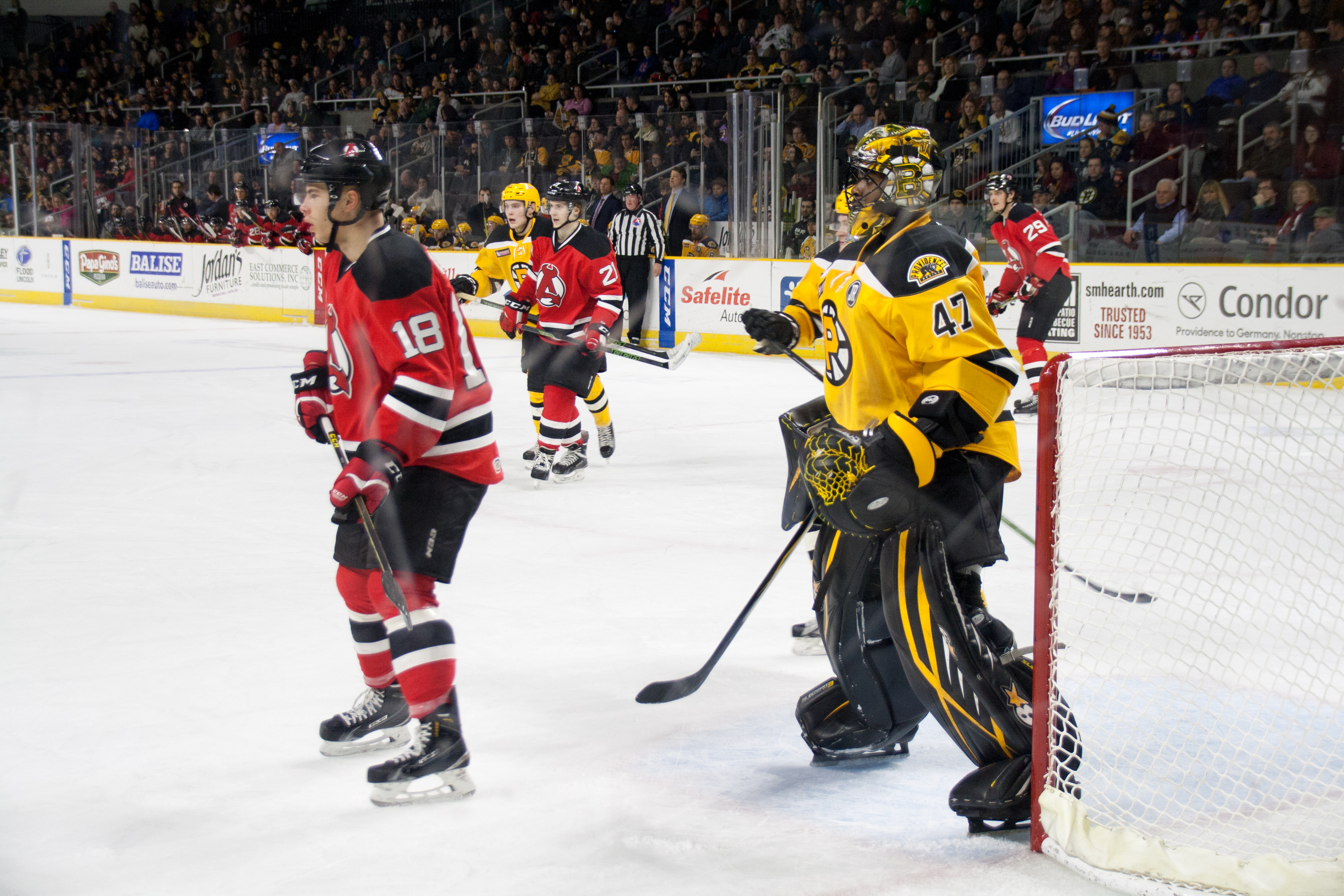
- Pietila with the Albany Devils in 2017
- Born: February 20, 1993 (age 33) Milford, Michigan, U.S.
- Height: 5 ft 11 in (180 cm)
- Weight: 200 lb (91 kg; 14 st 4 lb)
- Position: Left Wing
- Shot: Left
- Played for: New Jersey Devils
- NHL draft: 129th overall, 2011; New Jersey Devils
- Playing career: 2015–2021

Blake Chester Pietila (born February 20, 1993) is an American former professional ice hockey left winger who played with the New Jersey Devils in the National Hockey League (NHL). Pietila was drafted by the Devils in the 5th round of the 2011 NHL entry draft.

== Family ==
His grandfather was born and raised in Finland. Blake's brother also play hockey.

== Playing career ==
As a youth, Pietila played in the 2006 Quebec International Pee-Wee Hockey Tournament with the Detroit Compuware minor ice hockey team.

Pietila, of Finnish descent through his grandfather, played collegiate hockey with Michigan Tech of the Western Collegiate Hockey Association. After his four-year college career was completed after his senior season in 2014–15, Pietila, who was the captain, was signed to a two-year entry-level contract with the New Jersey Devils on May 27, 2015.

In his debut professional season in 2015–16, Pietila was initially reassigned to AHL affiliate, the Albany Devils. He later made his NHL debut for the Devils on March 24, 2016, against the Pittsburgh Penguins. He recorded his first NHL goal on March 31, 2016, against the Florida Panthers with only 5.1 seconds remaining in a 3-2 loss.

On July 26, 2017, the Devils re-signed Pietila to a two-year, two-way contract worth $1.335 million and $667,000 annually.

On July 2, 2019, Pietila left the Devils organization after four seasons as a free agent to sign a one-year, two-way contract with the Anaheim Ducks for the 2019–20 season. He played the duration of his contract with the Ducks assigned to AHL affiliate, the San Diego Gulls, recording 12 goals and 24 points through 49 regular season games before the season was cancelled due to the COVID-19 pandemic.

As a free agent from the Ducks leading into the pandemic delayed 2020–21 season, Pietila belatedly signed a professional tryout contract with the Hershey Bears of the AHL, affiliate to the Washington Capitals, on February 8, 2021.

== Career statistics ==
=== Regular season and playoffs ===
			Regular season					Playoffs
Season	Team	League	GP	G	A	Pts	PIM	GP	G	A	Pts	PIM
2009–10	U.S. National Development Team	USHL	28	5	3	8	27	—	—	—	—	—
2010–11	U.S. National Development Team	USHL	24	4	5	9	20	—	—	—	—	—
2011–12	Michigan Tech	WCHA	39	10	14	24	46	—	—	—	—	—
2012–13	Michigan Tech	WCHA	35	14	10	24	44	—	—	—	—	—
2013–14	Michigan Tech	WCHA	39	8	20	28	84	—	—	—	—	—
2014–15	Michigan Tech	WCHA	40	14	16	30	56	—	—	—	—	—
2015–16	Albany Devils	AHL	58	10	7	17	41	8	3	3	6	8
2015–16	New Jersey Devils	NHL	7	1	1	2	2	—	—	—	—	—
2016–17	Albany Devils	AHL	49	17	16	33	38	4	0	2	2	0
2016–17	New Jersey Devils	NHL	10	0	1	1	4	—	—	—	—	—
2017–18	Binghamton Devils	AHL	60	12	10	22	26	—	—	—	—	—
2017–18	New Jersey Devils	NHL	2	0	0	0	0	—	—	—	—	—
2018–19	Binghamton Devils	AHL	50	20	26	46	42	—	—	—	—	—
2018–19	New Jersey Devils	NHL	19	0	1	1	6	—	—	—	—	—
2019–20	San Diego Gulls	AHL	49	12	12	24	20	—	—	—	—	—
2020–21	Hershey Bears	AHL	6	0	1	1	8	—	—	—	—	—
NHL totals			38	1	3	4	12	—	—	—	—	—

=== International ===
Year	Team	Event	Result	GP	G	A	Pts	PIM
2010	United States	U17	1st place, gold medalist(s)	6	1	0	1	2
2011	United States	U18	1st place, gold medalist(s)	6	1	0	1	0
2013	United States	WJC	1st place, gold medalist(s)	7	0	2	2	0
Junior totals				19	2	2	4	2

== Awards and honors ==
Award	Year
College
All-WCHA Third Team	2014–15
