= Jason Zucker =

American ice hockey player (born 1992)

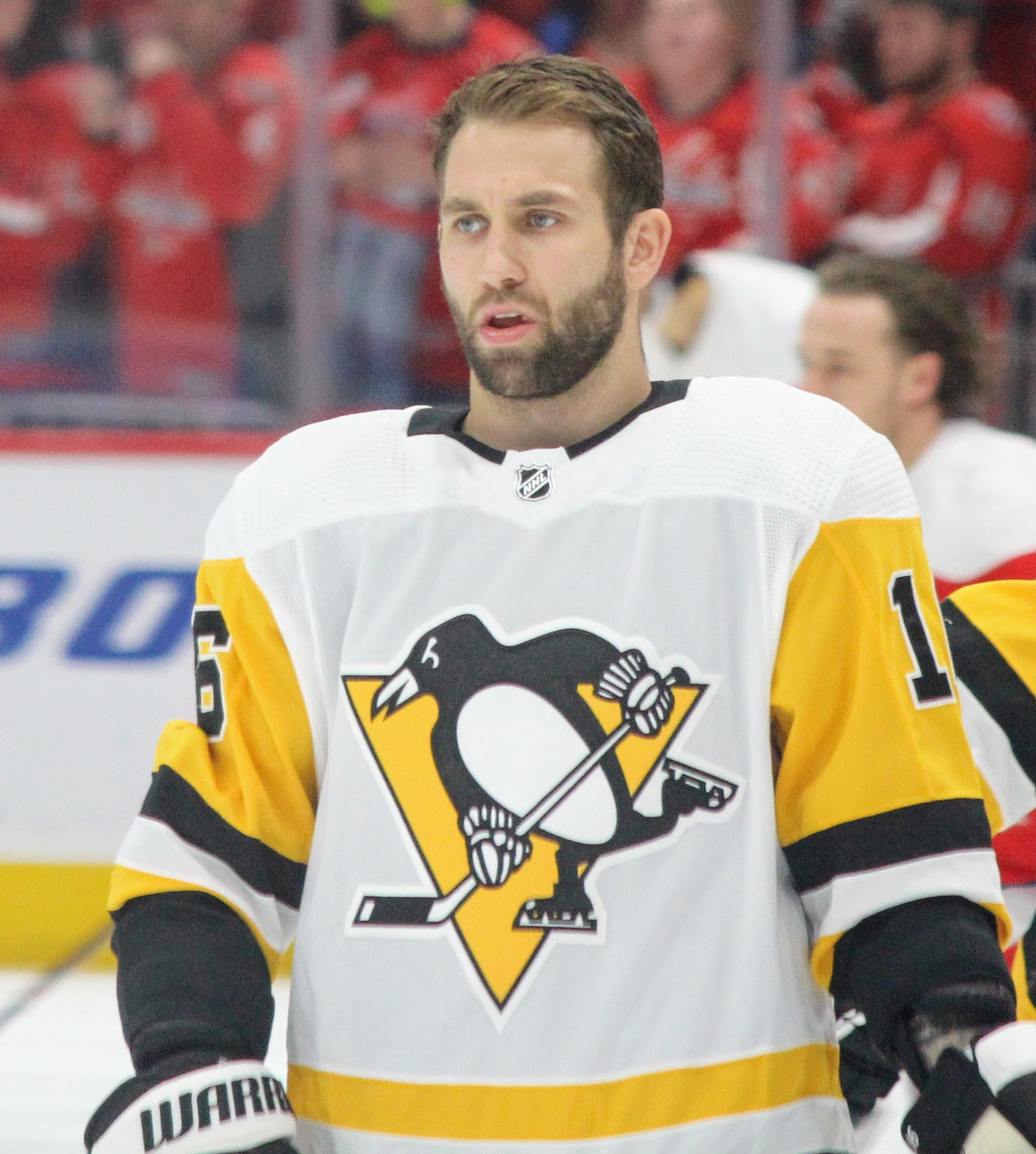
- Zucker with the Pittsburgh Penguins in 2020
- Born: January 16, 1992 (age 34) Newport Beach, California, U.S.
- Height: 5 ft 11 in (180 cm)
- Weight: 187 lb (85 kg; 13 st 5 lb)
- Position: Left wing
- Shoots: Left
- NHL team Former teams: Buffalo Sabres; Minnesota Wild; Pittsburgh Penguins; Arizona Coyotes; Nashville Predators
- NHL draft: 59th overall, 2010; Minnesota Wild
- Playing career: 2012–present

Jason Alan Zucker (born January 16, 1992) is an American professional ice hockey player who is a left winger for the Buffalo Sabres of the National Hockey League (NHL).

Zucker played in the 2010 World Juniors for the United States team, winning a gold medal. He was also a member of the bronze medal-winning team at the 2011 World Juniors. Playing for the University of Denver in 2010–11, he was the Western Collegiate Hockey Association Rookie of the Year. He was drafted in the second round (59th overall) of the 2010 NHL entry draft by the Minnesota Wild.

== Early life ==
Zucker was born in Newport Beach, California, and is Jewish. His mother, Natalie Zucker, is a former competitive figure skater, and his father, Scott Zucker, is a general contractor who built ice rinks and roller rinks when Jason was young. He has two older brothers, Evan and Adam, and a younger sister, Kimmie, and brother, Cameron.

When he was two months old, Zucker and his family moved to Las Vegas, Nevada. As a youth, he played in the 2004 and 2005 Quebec International Pee-Wee Hockey Tournaments with a minor ice hockey team from Los Angeles. He moved to Plymouth, Michigan, when he was 15 so he could play with the Compuware AAA Minor Midget Team, and finally to Ann Arbor, Michigan, for two years. Zucker attended Pioneer High School in Ann Arbor, Michigan.

Zucker has multiple tattoos: on his back, "USA" (a nod to his playing for the national team); on his chest, "Game Time" (in memory of his best friend, Nick Scheafer, who died in 2010 at the age of 19 in a car accident); and on his left arm, written in Hebrew, "In pursuit of perfection" (in honor of his Jewish heritage). In 2016, he got a young cancer patient's name, Tucker, who he met at Hockey Fights Cancer Awareness Night, tattooed onto his wrist, along with the words "shoot more" in memory of the boy who died on July 2, 2016.

== Playing career ==
=== College career ===
Playing for the University of Denver in 2010–11, he was the Western Collegiate Hockey Association (WCHA) Rookie of the Year, and was also named to the WCHA All-Rookie Team and 2nd All-Star Team. In his two seasons playing for Denver, he had 45 goals and 91 points in 78 games. He turned pro following the 2011–12 season.

=== Professional career ===
==== Minnesota Wild ====
Zucker was drafted by the Minnesota Wild of the National Hockey League (NHL) in the second round (59th overall) of the 2010 NHL entry draft. He was the first Nevada-raised draft pick (and, subsequently, player) in NHL history. Zucker signed his entry-level contract with the Wild on March 27, 2012. He made his NHL debut in a victory against the Florida Panthers on March 29, 2012. The 2012–13 NHL season was delayed by the 2012–13 NHL lockout and Zucker was assigned to Minnesota's American Hockey League (AHL) affiliate, the Houston Aeros, where he registered 50 points in 55 games. He played in the 2013 AHL All-Star Classic, representing the Aeros. Zucker was named to the AHL All-Rookie Team after leading the Aeros in scoring with 24 goals.

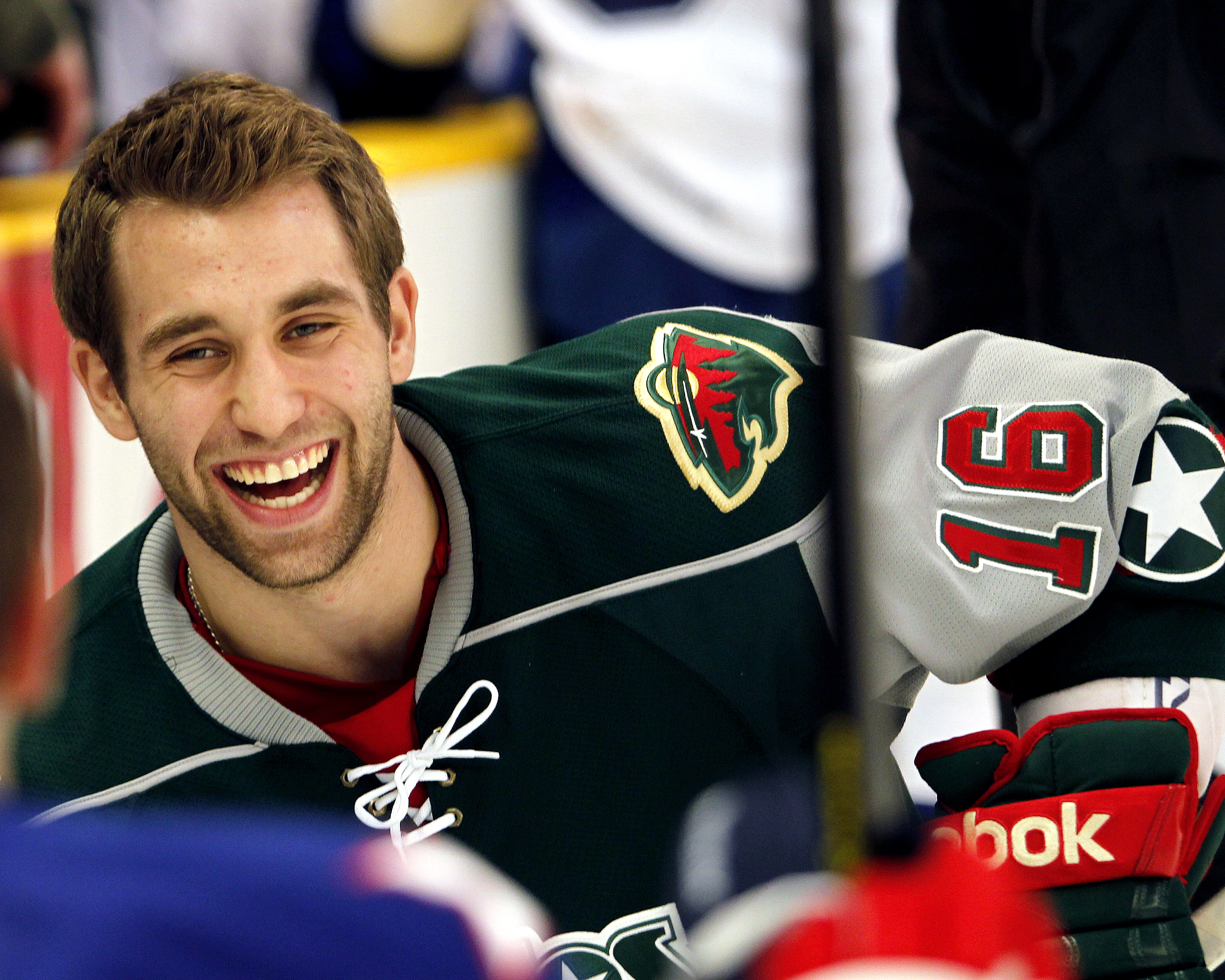
Zucker at the 2013 AHL All-Star Game

Zucker was recalled by Minnesota and appeared in 20 regular season games with Minnesota, playing mostly on the team's second line alongside Matt Cullen and Devin Setoguchi. He scored his first NHL goal against Petr Mrázek on February 17, 2013, in a Wild win over the Detroit Red Wings. On May 5, 2013, Zucker scored at 2:15 of the extra period to give the Wild a 3–2 victory over the Chicago Blackhawks, to pull within 2–1 in the Western Conference quarterfinal series. However, the Blackhawks eliminated the Wild in five games.

On March 26, 2014, Zucker underwent successful surgery on his left quadriceps to repair a tendon. He missed the remainder of the 2013–14 season, but was ready for the start of the 2014–15 campaign. In 2014–15 he scored 21 goals in 51 games, and was tenth in the NHL with a 16.9% shooting percentage. On October 25, 2015, he set a Wild team record by scoring 10 seconds into a 5–4 loss to the Winnipeg Jets (Zucker later tied his own record in a game against the Colorado Avalanche in April 2017). The only other NHL players who have scored within the first 10 seconds of two different games are Montreal's Bobby Rousseau (once in 1962–63, and once in 1965–66) and Yvan Cournoyer (both in 1973–74).

In 2015–16 he played in a career-high 71 games, and had 13 goals and 10 assists. In June 2016, the Wild re-signed him to a two-year, $4 million contract. During the 2016–17 season, Zucker set new career highs once again by playing in 79 games while recording 22 goals and 25 assists for 47 points. He finished tied for sixth in team scoring. Zucker recorded his first NHL hat-trick on November 9, 2017, against the Montreal Canadiens. On May 2, 2018, Zucker was named a finalist for the King Clancy Memorial Trophy, along with P. K. Subban, and the Sedin brothers.

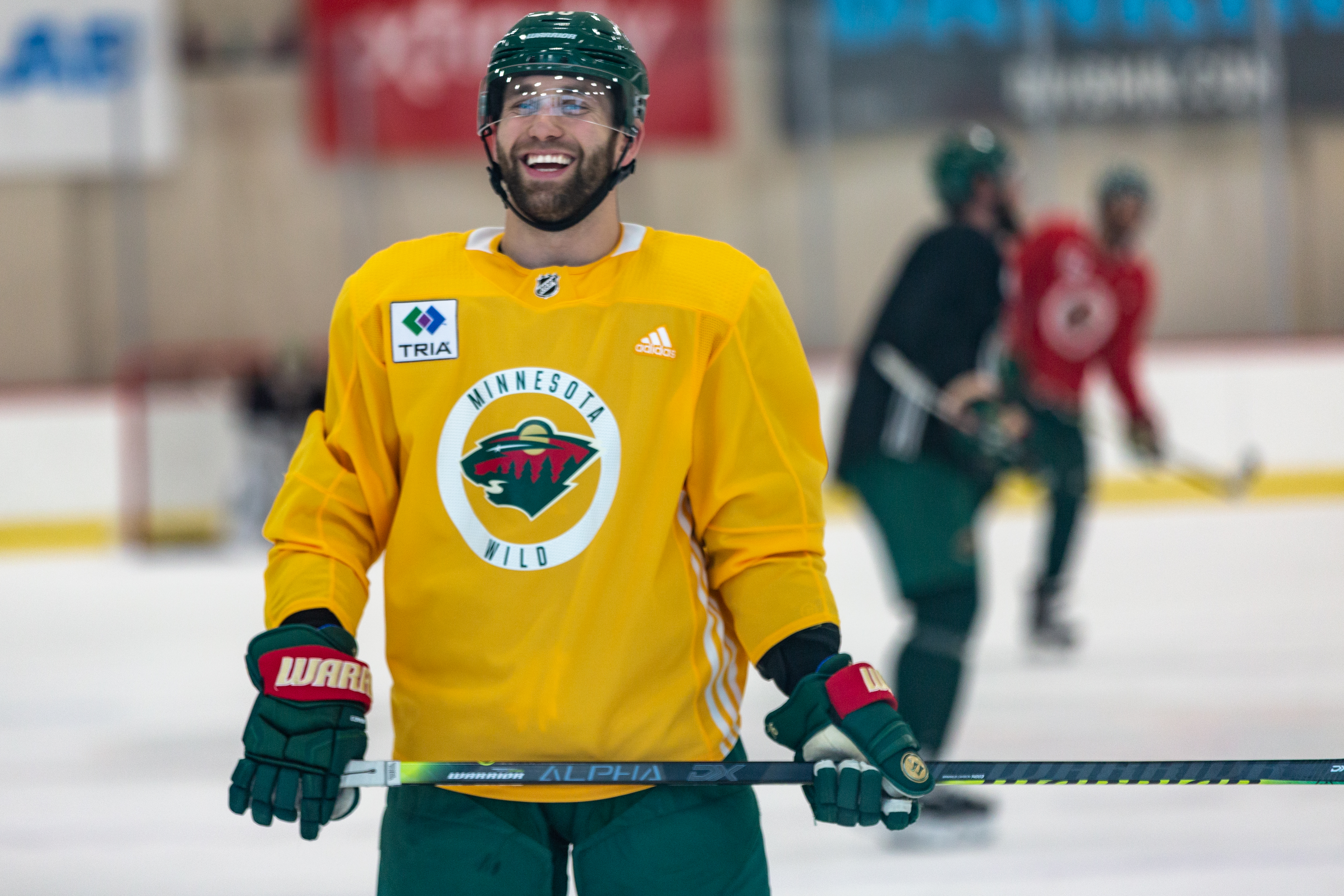
Zucker at practice in January 2019

On July 25, 2018, Zucker signed a five-year, $27.5 million contract extension with the Wild. Zucker scored his 100th NHL goal on October 13, 2018, in a home overtime loss against the Carolina Hurricanes. He is the seventh Minnesota Wild player to record 100 goals with the team. Zucker received the 2018–19 King Clancy Memorial Trophy as "the player who best exemplifies leadership qualities on and off the ice and has made a noteworthy humanitarian contribution in his community."

In his career with the Wild, in 456 NHL games he had 132 goals (fourth on the Wild's all-time list), 111 assists, and 243 points (9th).

==== Pittsburgh Penguins ====
On February 10, 2020, Zucker was traded by the Wild to the Pittsburgh Penguins in exchange for Calen Addison, Alex Galchenyuk, and a conditional first round pick in the 2020 NHL entry draft (condition within the trade later converted the pick to a first round pick in the 2021 NHL entry draft). Zucker was under contract with the Penguins for three years, through the 2022–23 season, for an average annual value of $5.5 million. He made his Penguins debut on February 11 in a 2–1 loss to the Tampa Bay Lightning, playing on a line with Sidney Crosby. He scored his first two goals in a Penguins uniform against Carey Price in a 4–1 win over the Montreal Canadiens on February 14. Zucker later made his Penguins playoff debut against the Canadiens on August 1 in Game 1 of their first round series. He scored in a Game 2 win for the Penguins to tie the series, but the Canadiens eliminated the Penguins to move on to the next round.

In the pandemic-shortened 2020–21 season, Zucker struggled, scoring eight goals and 17 points. In the 2021–22 season, Zucker suffered a number of injuries that limited him to just 32 games before coming back in March. In his first game back, and his first game against his former team, the Minnesota Wild, Zucker was injured again. He finished the season having played just 41 games. During the 2022–23 season, Zucker appeared in 78 games, the most since the 2018–19 season. Playing mostly on the second line, Zucker scored 27 goals and 48 points.

==== Arizona Coyotes ====
Having concluded his contract with the Penguins, Zucker was signed as a free agent to a one-year, $5.3 million contract with the Arizona Coyotes on July 1, 2023. He made his Coyotes debut in the season-opening shootout victory over the New Jersey Devils. He scored his first goal with Arizona on October 19 on a pass from Matias Maccelli on the power play in a 6–2 victory over the St. Louis Blues. On January 2, 2024, Nick Cousins of the Florida Panthers laid a dangerous check on Zucker's teammate, Juuso Välimäki near the boards. Zucker retaliated by checking Cousins hard into the boards, giving Cousins a concussion. On the play, Zucker received three major penalties and was suspended for three games on January 3 for boarding. In 51 games with Arizona, he had nine goals and 25 points.

==== Nashville Predators ====
On March 8, 2024, at the NHL trading deadline, Zucker was traded to the Nashville Predators in exchange for a 2024 sixth-round draft pick. He made his Predators debut on March 9 in a 2–1 victory over the Columbus Blue Jackets. He scored his first goal for Nashville on March 13, knocking in a rebound from a Colton Sissons shot in a 4–2 win over the Winnipeg Jets. He registered a multi-goal game on March 28, scoring twice against his former team, the Arizona Coyotes, in an 8–4 loss. In 18 games with the Predators, he recorded five goals and seven points. Nashville made the 2024 Stanley Cup playoffs and faced the Vancouver Canucks in the first round. The Predators were eliminated in six games and Zucker scored one goal and three points in the series.

==== Buffalo Sabres ====
On July 1, 2024, Zucker signed as a free agent to a one-year, $5 million contract with the Buffalo Sabres. Zucker signed a two-year, $9.5 million contract extension with the Sabres on March 7, 2025.

== International play ==
Medal record

Representing United States

Ice hockey

IIHF World U18 Championship
Gold medal – first place	2009 United States	
Gold medal – first place	2010 Belarus	

World Junior Hockey Championships
Gold medal – first place	2010 Canada	
Bronze medal – third place	2011 United States	

Zucker played for the United States junior team in the 2009 World Juniors and 2010 World Juniors, winning a gold medal in 2010. He was also a member of the bronze medal-winning team at the 2011 World Juniors.

== Personal life ==
Zucker married Minneapolis-based sports and entertainment journalist and television personality Carly Aplin in mid 2016. She is a television host for the Minnesota Timberwolves Entertainment Network (TEN) and a reporter for CBS Sports and Fox Sports North, who in February 2018 premiered a sports talk radio show named "Overtime with Carly Zucker" on KFAN 100.3 FM. Jason and Carly have a son and a daughter together. They filed for divorce in 2023.

Zucker is Jewish, though not religious. He did not have a bar mitzvah celebration because he never wanted to miss hockey; however, he does celebrate Hanukkah.

== Career statistics ==
=== Regular season and playoffs ===
			Regular season					Playoffs
Season	Team	League	GP	G	A	Pts	PIM	GP	G	A	Pts	PIM
2008–09	U.S. NTDP U17	USDP	12	8	6	14		—	—	—	—	—
2008–09	U.S. NTDP U18	USDP	12	2	6	8	8	—	—	—	—	—
2008–09	U.S. NTDP U18	NAHL	36	11	4	15	55	—	—	—	—	—
2009–10	U.S. NTDP Juniors	USHL	22	11	7	18	23	—	—	—	—	—
2009–10	U.S. NTDP U18	USDP	38	18	17	35	24	—	—	—	—	—
2010–11	University of Denver	WCHA	40	23	22	45	59	—	—	—	—	—
2011–12	University of Denver	WCHA	38	22	24	46	38	—	—	—	—	—
2011–12	Minnesota Wild	NHL	6	0	2	2	2	—	—	—	—	—
2012–13	Houston Aeros	AHL	55	24	26	50	43	1	0	0	0	4
2012–13	Minnesota Wild	NHL	20	4	1	5	8	5	1	1	2	0
2013–14	Iowa Wild	AHL	22	8	5	13	55	—	—	—	—	—
2013–14	Minnesota Wild	NHL	21	4	1	5	2	—	—	—	—	—
2014–15	Minnesota Wild	NHL	51	21	5	26	18	10	2	1	3	2
2015–16	Minnesota Wild	NHL	71	13	10	23	20	6	0	2	2	2
2016–17	Minnesota Wild	NHL	79	22	25	47	30	5	1	0	1	2
2017–18	Minnesota Wild	NHL	82	33	31	64	44	5	0	0	0	0
2018–19	Minnesota Wild	NHL	81	21	21	42	28	—	—	—	—	—
2019–20	Minnesota Wild	NHL	45	14	15	29	19	—	—	—	—	—
2019–20	Pittsburgh Penguins	NHL	15	6	6	12	2	4	2	0	2	0
2020–21	Pittsburgh Penguins	NHL	38	9	9	18	21	6	2	1	3	2
2021–22	Pittsburgh Penguins	NHL	41	8	9	17	15	5	0	2	2	2
2022–23	Pittsburgh Penguins	NHL	78	27	21	48	47	—	—	—	—	—
2023–24	Arizona Coyotes	NHL	51	9	16	25	58	—	—	—	—	—
2023–24	Nashville Predators	NHL	18	5	2	7	23	6	1	2	3	2
2024–25	Buffalo Sabres	NHL	73	21	32	53	57	—	—	—	—	—
2025–26	Buffalo Sabres	NHL	62	24	21	45	23	13	2	2	4	4
NHL totals			832	241	227	468	417	65	11	11	22	16

=== International ===
Year	Team	Event	Result	GP	G	A	Pts	PIM
2009	United States	U17	3rd place, bronze medalist(s)	6	4	3	7	4
2009	United States	U18	1st place, gold medalist(s)	7	1	5	6	0
2010	United States	WJC	1st place, gold medalist(s)	7	2	0	2	2
2010	United States	U18	1st place, gold medalist(s)	7	4	3	7	2
2011	United States	WJC	3rd place, bronze medalist(s)	4	1	0	1	0
2012	United States	WJC	7th	6	3	4	7	2
Junior totals				37	15	15	30	10

== Awards and honors ==
Award	Year	Ref
College
All-WCHA Rookie Team	2010–11	
All-WCHA Second Team	2010–11, 2011–12	
AHCA West Second-Team All-American	2011–12	
WCHA All-Tournament Team	2012	
AHL
All-Star Game	2013	
All-Rookie Team	2013	
NHL
King Clancy Memorial Trophy	2019	

== See also ==
- List of select Jewish ice hockey players

Awards and achievements
Preceded by Danny Kristo	WCHA Rookie of the Year; 2010–11	Succeeded by Joey LaLeggia
Preceded by Henrik Sedin / Daniel Sedin	King Clancy Memorial Trophy winner 2019	Succeeded by Matt Dumba
