= Ed Dempsey =

Canadian ice hockey coach

Ed Dempsey was the head coach of the Prince George Spruce Kings of the British Columbia Hockey League. He moved to the lower-tier Spruce Kings after being dismissed as the head coach for the Prince George Cougars of the Western Hockey League.
